= 2022 UCLA Bruins football team =

American college football season

2022 UCLA Bruins football

Sun Bowl, L 35–37 vs. Pittsburgh
- Conference: Pac-12 Conference

Ranking
- Coaches: No. 21
- AP: No. 21
- Record: 9–4 (6–3 Pac-12)
- Head coach: Chip Kelly (5th season)
- Offensive scheme: Spread option
- Defensive coordinator: Bill McGovern (1st season)
- Base defense: 3–4
- Home stadium: Rose Bowl

Uniform
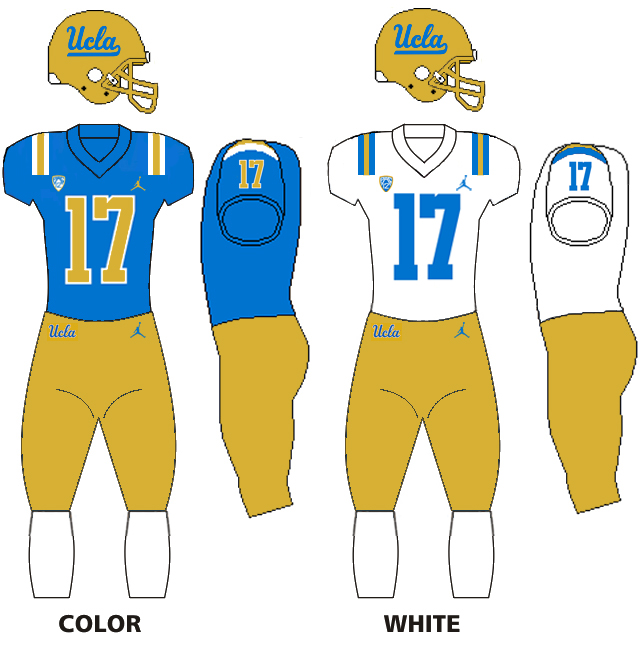

2022 Pac-12 Conference football standings
	Conf.			Overall
Team	W		L	W		L
No. 12 USC y	8	–	1	11	–	3
No. 10 Utah y$	7	–	2	10	–	4
No. 8 Washington	7	–	2	11	–	2
No. 15 Oregon	7	–	2	10	–	3
No. 17 Oregon State	6	–	3	10	–	3
No. 21 UCLA	6	–	3	9	–	4
Washington State	4	–	5	7	–	6
Arizona	3	–	6	5	–	7
California	2	–	7	4	–	8
Arizona State†	1	–	7	1	–	9
Stanford	1	–	8	3	–	9
Colorado	1	–	8	1	–	11
Championship: Utah 47, USC 24
$ – Conference champion; y – Championship game participant; Rankings from AP Poll

The 2022 UCLA Bruins football team represented the University of California, Los Angeles during the 2022 NCAA Division I FBS football season. The team was led by fifth-year head coach Chip Kelly and competed as members of the Pac-12 Conference. After starting the season 5–0 for the first time since 2013, the Bruins made their first appearance of the season in the AP Poll at No. 18.

== Offseason ==
=== Incoming transfers ===
The Bruins added 6 players via transfer during the offseason:

- OT Raiqwon O'Neal - Rutgers
- DL Laiatu Latu – Washington
- LB Darius Muasau – Hawaii
- WR Jake Bobo – Duke (graduate)
- DL Jacob Sykes – Harvard
- CB Azizi Hearn – Wyoming

== Preseason ==
- The Bruins began spring practices on Tuesday, March 29 until Saturday, April 30
- The 2022 Spring Showcase will be held on Saturday, April 23 – 9 a.m. and shown on P12 Network
- Dorian Thompson-Robinson and Zach Charbonnet named to the Maxwell Award watch list
- Dorian Thompson-Robinson named to the O'Brien Award watch list
- Zach Charbonnet is listed for the Doak Walker Award
- Jake Bobo named to the Biletnikoff Award watch list
- Michael Ezeike named to the John Mackey Award watch list
- Carl Jones Jr. and Darius named to the Butkus Award watch list
- Chase Griffin added to the Wuerffel Trophy watch list
- Kazmeir Allen named to the Paul Hornung Award watch list
- Pac-12 media day was held on July 29, 2022, at Novo Theater, L.A. Live featuring Chip Kelly (3:00 p.m.), Jon Gaines II (OL) and Stephan Blaylock (DB)
- UCLA is picked as the 4th place team in the preseason Pac-12 Conference media poll
- Jack Landherr IV was added to the Patrick Mannelly Award watch list
- Dorian Thompson-Robinson is named to the Manning Award watch list

== Personnel ==
=== Coaching staff ===
Name	Position	Year at UCLA	Alma mater (year)
Chip Kelly	Head coach/offensive coordinator	5th	New Hampshire (1990)
Ryan Gunderson	Quarterbacks	2nd	Oregon State (2007)
Bill McGovern	Defensive coordinator	1st	Holy Cross (1985)
DeShaun Foster	Running backs	5th	UCLA (2014)
Jerry Neuheisel	Wide receivers	5th	UCLA (2015)
Chad Kauha'aha'a	Defensive line	1st	Utah (1997)
Tim Drevno	Offensive line	1st	Cal State Fullerton (1992)
Ken Norton Jr.	Inside linebackers	1st	UCLA (1987)
Brian Norwood	Defensive backs Passing game coordinator Assistant head coach	3rd	Hawai'i (1988)
Ikaika Malloe	Outside linebackers/special teams	1st	Washington (1997)
Jeff Faris	Tight ends	1st	Duke (2011)

== Roster ==
2022 UCLA Bruins football team roster
Players
Coaches
Offense

Pos.	#	Name	Class
WR	0	Kam Brown	Jr
QB	1	Dorian Thompson-Robinson	Sr
WR	2	Titus Mokiao-Atimalala	So
QB	3	Chase Artopoeus	Jr
WR	4	Ethan Garbers	So
QB	6	Justyn Martin	Fr
WR	7	Colson Yankoff	Jr
WR	9	Jake Bobo	Sr
WR	10	Ryan Cragun	Sr
QB	11	Chase Griffin	Sr
WR	12	Matt Sykes	Jr
WR	14	Josiah Norwood	Sr
QB	15	Sean Holland	Sr
WR	15	Bredan Pegan	Fr
WR	17	Logan Loya	Jr
WR	18	Jadyn Marshall	Fr
WR	19	Kazmeir Allen	Jr
WR	20	D. J. Justice	Fr
WR	21	Bradley Schlom	So
RB	22	Keegan Jones	Jr
RB	24	Zach Charbonnet	Sr
RB	25	T. J. Harden	Fr
WR	25	Ezavier Staples	Fr
RB	26	Brian Kowall	So
WR	27	Ashton Authement	Jr
RB	28	Josiah Gonzales	Fr
RB	31	Deshun Murrell	Fr
RB	32	Christian Grubb	Jr
WR	35	Devanti Dillard	So
WR	37	Elijah Rodriguez	Fr
OL	50	Tyler Manoa	Sr
OL	52	Benjamin Roy Jr.	Fr
OL	53	Sam Yoon	Fr
OL	54	Josh Carlin	Jr
OL	56	Atonio Mafi	Sr
OL	57	Jon Gaines II	Sr
OL	59	Siale Taupaki	Jr
OL	62	Duke Clemens	Sr
OL	63	Brad Whitworth	Jr
OL	64	Sam Marrazzo	Sr
OL	66	Niki Prongos	Fr
OL	67	Yutaka Mahe	Fr
OL	68	Noah Pulealii	Fr
OL	69	Justin Williams	So
OL	71	Raiqwon O'Neal	Jr
OL	72	Garrett DiGiorgio	Fr
OL	75	Bruno Fina	So
OL	77	Jaylan Jeffers	So
OL	78	Liam Douglass	Sr
TE	81	Hudson Habermehl	Jr
TE	82	Sam Summa	Fr
TE	83	David Priebe	Jr
TE	85	Carsen Ryan	Fr
TE	86	Michael Ezeike	Sr
TE	87	Grant Norberg	So
TE	89	Michael Churich	Jr
TE	98	Jack Pedersen	Fr

Defense

Pos.	#	Name	Class
LB	1	Ale Kaho	Sr
DB	3	Devin Kirkwood	So
DB	4	Stephan Blaylock	Sr
DB	6	John Humphrey	Jr
DB	7	Mo Osling III	Sr
LB	9	Choé Bryant-Strother	So
DB	10	Joshua Swift	So
DL	11	Gabriel Murphy	So
DL	12	Grayson Murphy	So
DB	14	Clint Stephens	Fr
LB	15	Laiatu Latu	Jr
LB	17	Jalen Woods	Fr
DB	18	Croix Stewart	Fr
DB	19	Alex Johnson	Jr
LB	20	Kain Medrano	Jr
LB	21	JonJon Vaughns	Jr
DB	22	Azizi Hearn	Sr
DB	23	Kenny Churchwell III	Jr
DB	24	Jaylin Davies	Fr
DB	27	Kamari Ramsey	Fr
LB	29	Adam Cohen	Jr
DB	29	Evan Thomas	So
DB	30	Jax Harley	Fr
DB	31	Isaiah Newcombe	Fr
DB	32	William Nimmo Jr.	Jr
LB	33	Bo Calvert	Sr
LB	33	Jake Newman	Jr
LB	35	Carl Jones Jr.	Sr
LB	39	Kaleb Tuliau	Jr
LB	41	Devin Aupiu	So
DB	41	Jelani Warren	Jr
LB	43	James Dinneen	Jr
DL	44	Martin Andrus Jr.	Sr
DL	46	Hayden Harris	Jr
LB	47	Erich Osteen	Jr
LB	47	Shea Pitts	Sr
LB	48	Joquarri Price	So
LB	49	Carson Schwesinger	Fr
LB	52	Jeremiah Trojan	So
LB	53	Darius Muasau	Sr
LB	56	Kobey Fitzgerald	Sr
LB	58	Gary Smith III	Jr
DL	92	Quintin Somerville	Fr
DL	93	Jay Toia	So
DL	94	Dovid Magna	Jr
DL	95	Sitiveni Havili-Kaufusi	So
DL	96	Hayden Nelson	Fr
DL	99	Jacob Sykes	Sr

Special teams

Pos.	#	Name	Class
K	2	Nicholas Barr-Mira	Jr
P	45	Chase Barry	Fr
LS	51	Jack Landherr IV	Sr
LS	60	Beau Gardner	So
K	93	R. J. Lopez	So
K	96	Ari Libenson	So
K	97	Joseph Firebaugh Jr.	Fr
K	99	Kalen Jones	Fr

Head coach

- Chip Kelly

Coordinators/assistant coaches

- Brian Norwood – Assistant head coach/passing game coordinator/defensive backs
- Bill McGovern – Defensive coordinator
- Ikaika Malloe – Outside linebackers/special teams coordinator
- DeShaun Foster – Running backs
- Tim Drevno – Offensive line
- Jerry Neuheisel – Wide receivers
- Ryan Gunderson – Quarterbacks
- Jeff Faris – Tight ends
- Chad Kauha'aha'a – Defensive line
- Ken Norton Jr. – Inside linebackers
- Keith Belton – Director, football performance

Legend

- (C) Team captain
- (S) Suspended
- (I) Ineligible
- Injured
- Redshirt

Roster
Last update: 8/22/22

== Schedule ==
Date	Time	Opponent	Rank	Site	TV	Result	Attendance
September 3	11:30 a.m.	Bowling Green*		Rose Bowl; Pasadena, CA	P12N	W 45–17	27,143
September 10	2:00 p.m.	Alabama State*		Rose Bowl; Pasadena, CA	P12N	W 45–7	33,647
September 17	11:00 a.m.	South Alabama*		Rose Bowl; Pasadena, CA	P12N	W 32–31	29,344
September 24	11:00 a.m.	at Colorado		Folsom Field; Boulder, CO	P12N	W 45–17	42,848
September 30	7:30 p.m.	No. 15 Washington		Rose Bowl; Pasadena, CA (Rose Bowl Centennial game)	ESPN	W 40–32	41,343
October 8	12:30 p.m.	No. 11 Utah	No. 18	Rose Bowl; Pasadena, CA	FOX	W 42–32	42,038
October 22	12:30 p.m.	at No. 10 Oregon	No. 9	Autzen Stadium; Eugene, OR (College GameDay)	FOX	L 30–45	59,962
October 29	7:30 p.m.	Stanford^{†}	No. 12	Rose Bowl; Pasadena, CA (rivalry)	ESPN	W 38–13	43,850
November 5	7:30 p.m.	at Arizona State	No. 12	Sun Devil Stadium; Tempe, AZ	FS1	W 50–36	51,265
November 12	7:30 p.m.	Arizona	No. 12	Rose Bowl; Pasadena, CA	FOX	L 28–34	44,430
November 19	5:00 p.m.	No. 7 USC	No. 16	Rose Bowl; Pasadena, CA (Victory Bell)	FOX	L 45–48	70,865
November 25	1:30 p.m.	at California	No. 18	California Memorial Stadium; Berkeley, CA (rivalry)	FOX	W 35–28	36,221
December 30	11:00 a.m.	vs. Pittsburgh*	No. 18	Sun Bowl; El Paso, TX (Sun Bowl)	CBS	L 35–37	41,104
*Non-conference game; ^{†}Homecoming; Rankings from AP Poll (and CFP Rankings, after November 1) - Released prior to game; All times are in Pacific time

== Game summaries ==
=== vs Bowling Green ===
This is the first meeting between the Falcons and the Bruins. Quarterbacking for Bowling Green is Matt McDonald, son of former USC All-American quarterback Paul McDonald. UCLA linebacker Shea Pitts is the son of former UCLA defensive back Ron Pitts (1981–84).

27,143 people is the lowest attended game in UCLA history at the Rose Bowl, edging out 1992's Oregon State vs UCLA, which 32,513 people attended.

Bowling Green Falcons (0–0) vs UCLA Bruins (0–0) – Game summary

Quarter	1	2	3	4	Total
Falcons	10	7	0	0	17
Bruins	7	17	7	14	45

at Rose Bowl • Pasadena, CA

- Date: September 3, 2022
- Game time: 11:30 a.m.
- Game weather: Sunny, 101 °F (38 °C)
- Game attendance: 27,143
- Referee: Mike McCabe
- TV announcers (Pac-12 Network): Roxy Bernstein (play-by-play), Lincoln Kennedy (analyst)

Game information

First quarter

- (13:46) BGSU – Charles Rosser 11-yard return of blocked punt, Mason Lawler kick (Drive: 4 plays, -2 yards, 1:14; Bowling Green 7–0)
- (12:20) UCLA – Dorian Thompson-Robinson 68-yard run, Nicholas Barr-Mira kick (Drive: 3 plays, 75 yards, 1:26; Tied 7–7)
- (4:29) BGSU – Mason Lawler 24-yard field goal (Drive: 4 plays, 5 yards, 1:13; Bowling Green 14–7)

Second quarter

- (13:43) BGSU – Christian Sims 22-yard pass from Matt McDonald, Mason Lawler kick (Drive: 8 plays, 73 yards, 2:31; Bowling Green 17–7)
- (8:28) UCLA – Nicholas Barr-Mira 24-yard field goal (Drive: 10 plays, 59 yards, 5:15; Bowling Green 17–10)
- (4:04) UCLA – Kazmeir Allen 20-yard pass from Dorian Thompson-Robinson, Nicholas Barr-Mira kick (Drive: 8 plays, 61 yards, 2:58; Tied 17–17)
- (2:18) UCLA – Keegan Jones 52-yard pass from Dorian Thompson-Robinson, Nicholas Barr-Mira kick (Drive: 1 plays, 52 yards, 0:00; UCLA 24–17)

Third quarter

- (11:03) UCLA – Zach Charbonnet 4-yard run, Nicholas Barr-Mira kick (Drive: 8 plays, 58 yards, 2:20; UCLA 31–17)

Fourth quarter

- (14:54) UCLA – Dorian Thompson-Robinson 8-yard run, Nicholas Barr-Mira kick (Drive: 9 plays, 47 yards, 2:45; UCLA 38–17)
- (4:21) UCLA – Josiah Norwood 50-yard pass from Ethan Garbers, Nicholas Barr-Mira kick (Drive: 7 plays, 68 yards, 2:44; UCLA 45–17)

Statistics	BGSU	UCLA
First downs	9	29
Total yards	162	626
Rushes/yards	25–37	45–269
Passing yards	125	357
Passing: Comp–Att–Int	17–36–0	35–47–1
Time of possession	25:12	34:48

Team	Category	Player	Statistics
Bowling Green	Passing	Matt McDonald	17/34, 125 yards, TD
Bowling Green	Rushing	Jamal Johnson	10 carries, 45 yards
Bowling Green	Receiving	Christian Sims	4 receptions, 33 yards, TD
UCLA	Passing	Dorian Thompson-Robinson	32/43, 298 yards, 2 TD, INT
UCLA	Rushing	Zach Charbonnet	21 carries, 111 yards, TD
UCLA	Receiving	Kazmeir Allen	10 receptions, 85 yards, TD

=== vs Alabama State ===
First game in program history against a FCS team.

Alabama State Hornets (2–0) vs UCLA Bruins (1–0) – Game summary

Quarter	1	2	3	4	Total
Hornets	0	7	0	0	7
Bruins	14	17	7	7	45

at Rose Bowl • Pasadena, CA

- Date: September 10, 2022
- Game time: 2:00 p.m.
- Game weather: Cloudy, 78 °F (26 °C)
- Game attendance: 33,647
- Referee: Matthew Richards
- TV announcers (Pac-12 Network): J. B. Long (play-by-play), Nigel Burton (analyst)

Game information

First quarter

- (7:58) UCLA – Keegan Jones 2-yard run, Nicholas Barr-Mira kick (Drive: 6 plays, 68 yards, 2:10; UCLA 7–0)
- (4:53) UCLA – Hudson Habermehl 25-yard pass from Dorian Thompson-Robinson, Nicholas Barr-Mira kick (Drive: 1 plays, 25 yards, 0:00; UCLA 14–0)

Second quarter

- (13:53) ALST – Jeremiah Hixon 21–yard pass from Myles Crawley, Myles Crawley kick (Drive: 8 plays, 60 yards, 2:43; UCLA 14–7)
- (10:39) UCLA – Ethan Garbers 5-yard run, Nicholas Barr-Mira kick (Drive: 11 plays, 70 yards, 3:09; UCLA 21–7)
- (2:43) UCLA – Nicholas Barr-Mira 19-yard field goal (Drive: 11 plays, 83 yards, 4:14; UCLA 24–7)
- (1:02) UCLA – Ethan Garbers 2-yard run, Nicholas Barr-Mira kick (Drive: 6 plays, 62 yards, 0:42; UCLA 31–7)

Third quarter

- (12:23) UCLA – T. J. Harden 13-yard run, Nicholas Barr-Mira kick (Drive: 8 plays, 70 yards, 2:33; UCLA 38–7)

Fourth quarter

- (13:24) UCLA – Christian Grubb 7-yard run, Joseph Firebaugh Jr. kick (Drive: 5 plays, 55 yards, 1:23; UCLA 45–7)

Statistics	ALST	UCLA
First downs	18	28
Total yards	310	485
Rushes/yards	36–87	38–220
Passing yards	223	265
Passing: Comp–Att–Int	18–32–2	23–30–1
Time of possession	35:48	24:12

Team	Category	Player	Statistics
Alabama State	Passing	Myles Crawley	16/27, 177 yards, TD, INT
Alabama State	Rushing	Santo Dunn	5 carries, 28 yards
Alabama State	Receiving	Darius Edmonds	3 receptions, 66 yards
UCLA	Passing	Ethan Garbers	14/18, 168 yards, INT
UCLA	Rushing	T. J. Harden	7 carries, 56 yards, TD
UCLA	Receiving	Carsen Ryan	3 receptions, 58 yards

=== vs South Alabama ===
South Alabama Jaguars (2–0) vs UCLA Bruins (2–0) – Game summary

Quarter	1	2	3	4	Total
Jaguars	10	7	14	0	31
Bruins	6	7	10	9	32

at Rose Bowl • Pasadena, CA

- Date: September 17, 2022
- Game time: 11:00 a.m.
- Game weather: Sunny, 71 °F (22 °C)
- Game attendance: 29,344
- Referee: Chris Coyte
- TV announcers (Pac-12 Network): Ted Robinson (play-by-play), Yogi Roth (analyst)

Game information

First quarter

- (12:15) UCLA – Nicholas Barr-Mira 38-yard field goal (Drive: 4 plays, 1 yards, 0:56; UCLA 3–0)
- (8:51) USA – Marco Lee 1-yard run, Diego Guajardo kick (Drive: 9 plays, 75 yards, 3:24; USA 7–3)
- (4:22) UCLA – Nicholas Barr-Mira 49-yard field goal (Drive: 10 plays, 59 yards, 4:24; USA 7–6)
- (1:18) USA – Diego Guajardo 38-yard field goal (Drive: 9 plays, 55 yards, 3:04; USA 10–6)

Second quarter

- (5:54) USA – La'Damian Webb 9-yard run, Diego Guajardo kick (Drive: 12 plays, 80 yards, 6:31; USA 17–6)
- (3:25) UCLA – Jake Bobo 9-yard pass from Dorian Thompson-Robinson, Nicholas Barr-Mira kick (Drive: 6 plays, 69 yards, 2:29; USA 17–13)

Third quarter

- (13:22) UCLA – Kam Brown 11-yard pass from Dorian Thompson-Robinson, Nicholas Barr-Mira kick (Drive: 4 plays, 75 yards, 1:38; UCLA 20–17)
- (4:46) UCLA – Nicholas Barr-Mira 28-yard field goal (Drive: 13 plays, 56 yards, 5:11; UCLA 23–17)
- (1:43) USA – Marco Lee 1-yard run, Diego Guajardo kick (Drive: 8 plays, 67 yards, 2:58; USA 24–23)
- (0:57) USA – Caullin Lacy Allen 4–yard pass from Carter Bradley, Diego Guajardo kick (Drive: 2 plays, 6 yards, 0:27; USA 31–23)

Fourth quarter

- (12:25) UCLA – Logan Loya 8-yard pass from Dorian Thompson-Robinson (Drive: 10 plays, 68 yards, 3:26; USA 31–29)
- (0:00) UCLA – Nicholas Barr-Mira 24-yard field goal (Drive: 10 plays, 61 yards, 2:52; UCLA 32–31)

Statistics	USA	UCLA
First downs	22	23
Total yards	399	407
Rushes/yards	34–162	37–144
Passing yards	237	263
Passing: Comp–Att–Int	26–36–1	20–30–0
Time of possession	32:47	27:13

Team	Category	Player	Statistics
South Alabama	Passing	Carter Bradley	26/36, 237 yards, TD, INT
South Alabama	Rushing	La'Damian Webb	16 carries, 124 yards, TD
South Alabama	Receiving	Jalen Wayne	7 receptions, 76 yards
UCLA	Passing	Dorian Thompson-Robinson	20/30, 263 yards, 3 TD
UCLA	Rushing	Zach Charbonnet	13 carries, 78 yards
UCLA	Receiving	Jake Bobo	5 receptions, 89 yards, TD

=== at Colorado ===
UCLA Bruins (3–0) at Colorado Buffaloes (0–3) – Game summary

Quarter	1	2	3	4	Total
Bruins	14	7	17	7	45
Buffaloes	0	10	0	7	17

at Folsom Field • Boulder, CO

- Date: September 24, 2022
- Game time: 12:00 p.m. MST
- Game weather: Sunny, 72 °F (22 °C)
- Game attendance: 42,848
- Referee: Michael Mothershed
- TV announcers (Pac-12 Network): Roxy Bernstein (play-by-play), Lincoln Kennedy (analyst)

Game information

First quarter

- (6:18) UCLA – Matt Sykes 24-yard pass from Dorian Thompson-Robinson, Nicholas Barr-Mira kick (Drive: 6 plays, 64 yards, 2:37; UCLA 7–0)
- (0:46) UCLA – Zach Charbonnet 35-yard run, Nicholas Barr-Mira kick (Drive: 7 plays, 95 yards, 1:46; UCLA 14–0)

Second quarter

- (12:12) COL – Cole Becker 35-yard field goal (Drive: 10 plays, 58 yards, 3:34; UCLA 14–3)
- (9:00) UCLA – Zach Charbonnet 13-yard run, Nicholas Barr-Mira kick (Drive: 7 plays, 75 yards, 3:12; UCLA 21–3)
- (0:19) COL – Owen McCown 2-yard run, Cole Becker kick (Drive: 9 plays, 74 yards, 3:38; UCLA 21–10)

Third quarter

- (13:23) UCLA – Zach Charbonnet 46-yard run, Nicholas Barr-Mira kick (Drive: 4 plays, 75 yards, 1:37; UCLA 28–10)
- (7:48) UCLA – Nicholas Barr-Mira 44-yard field goal (Drive: 4 plays, 5 yards, 1:18; UCLA 31–10)
- (6:03) UCLA – Colson Yankoff 2-yard pass from Dorian Thompson-Robinson, Nicholas Barr-Mira kick (Drive: 2 plays, 30 yards, 0:48; UCLA 38–10)

Fourth quarter

- (14:56) UCLA – Colson Yankoff 3-yard pass from Ethan Garbers, Joseph Firebaugh Jr. kick (Drive: 5 plays, 39 yards, 1:06; UCLA 45–10)
- (2:59) COL – Jordyn Tyson 8-yard pass from Owen McCown, Cole Becker kick (Drive: 14 plays, 85 yards, 6:36; UCLA 45–17)

Statistics	UCLA	COL
First downs	25	19
Total yards	515	309
Rushes/yards	34–249	34–51
Passing yards	266	258
Passing: Comp–Att–Int	22–29–0	26–42–1
Time of possession	25:53	34:07

Team	Category	Player	Statistics
UCLA	Passing	Dorian Thompson-Robinson	19/23, 234 yards, 2 TD
UCLA	Rushing	Zach Charbonnet	9 carries, 104 yards, 3 TD
UCLA	Receiving	Jake Bobo	4 receptions, 53 yards
Colorado	Passing	Owen McCown	26/42, 258 yards, TD, INT
Colorado	Rushing	Charlie Offerdahl	14 carries, 47 yards
Colorado	Receiving	Daniel Arias	4 receptions, 82 yards

=== vs No. 15 Washington ===
No. 15 Washington Huskies (4–0) vs UCLA Bruins (4–0) – Game summary

Quarter	1	2	3	4	Total
No. 15 Huskies	7	3	6	16	32
Bruins	9	17	14	0	40

at Rose Bowl • Pasadena, CA

- Date: September 30, 2022
- Game time: 7:35 p.m.
- Game weather: Sunny, 68 °F (20 °C)
- Game attendance: 41,343
- Referee: Matthew Richards
- TV announcers (ESPN): Roy Philpott (play-by-play), Andre Ware (analyst), Paul Carcaterra (sideline)

Game information

First quarter

- (10:28) WASH – Rome Odunze 33-yard pass from Michael Penix Jr., Peyton Henry kick (Drive: 10 plays, 75 yards, 4:32; Washington 7–0)
- (7:06) UCLA – Team Safety (Drive: 2 plays, -3 yards, 0:54; Washington 7–2)
- (2:54) UCLA – Zach Charbonnet 1-yard run, Nicholas Barr-Mira kick (Drive: 11 plays, 93 yards, 4:12; UCLA 9–7)

Second quarter

- (12:41) WASH – Peyton Henry 50-yard field goal (Drive: 12 plays, 43 yards, 5:13; Washington 10–9)
- (9:50) UCLA – Jake Bobo 12-yard pass from Dorian Thompson-Robinson, Nicholas Barr-Mira kick (Drive: 7 plays, 75 yards, 2:51; UCLA 16–10)
- (8:02) UCLA – Kam Brown 15-yard pass from Dorian Thompson-Robinson, Nicholas Barr-Mira kick (Drive: 1 plays, 15 yards, 0:06; UCLA 23–10)
- (2:29) UCLA – Nicholas Barr-Mira 24-yard field goal (Drive: 9 plays, 62 yards, 3:38; UCLA 26–10)

Third quarter

- (11:35) UCLA – Dorian Thompson-Robinson 2-yard run, Nicholas Barr-Mira kick (Drive: 9 plays, 75 yards, 3:25; UCLA 33–10)
- (5:40) WASH – Jalen McMillan 19-yard pass from Michael Penix Jr. (Drive: 13 plays, 75 yards, 5:55; UCLA 33–16)
- (3:46) UCLA – Jake Bobo 39-yard pass from Dorian Thompson-Robinson, Nicholas Barr-Mira kick (Drive: 4 plays, 65 yards, 1:54; UCLA 40–16)

Fourth quarter

- (12:03) WASH – Devin Culp 4-yard pass from Michael Penix Jr., Ja'Lynn Polk two-point run (Drive: 12 plays, 78 yards, 6:43; UCLA 40–24)
- (3:59) WASH – Rome Odunze 9-yard pass from Michael Penix Jr., Michael Penix Jr. two-point pass to Jalen McMillan (Drive: 12 plays, 93 yards, 3:59; UCLA 40–32)

Statistics	WASH	UCLA
First downs	24	27
Total yards	410	499
Rushes/yards	23–65	39–184
Passing yards	345	315
Passing: Comp–Att–Int	33–49–2	24–33–0
Time of possession	31:24	28:36

Team	Category	Player	Statistics
Washington	Passing	Michael Penix Jr.	33/48, 345 yards, 4 TD, 2 INT
Washington	Rushing	Wayne Taulapapa	10 carries, 48 yards
Washington	Receiving	Rome Odunze	8 receptions, 116 yards, 2 TD
UCLA	Passing	Dorian Thompson-Robinson	24/33, 315 yards, 3 TD
UCLA	Rushing	Zach Charbonnet	22 carries, 124 yards, TD
UCLA	Receiving	Jake Bobo	6 receptions, 144 yards, 2 TD

Thompson-Robinson threw for 315 yards and three touchdowns and ran for another touchdown as UCLA defeated No. 15 Washington 40–32 for the Huskies' first loss of the year. The Bruins extended their winning streak to eight games, dating back to 2021.

=== vs No. 11 Utah ===
No. 11 Utah Utes (4–1) vs No. 18 UCLA Bruins (5–0) – Game summary

Quarter	1	2	3	4	Total
No. 11 Utes	0	10	8	14	32
No. 18 Bruins	7	7	14	14	42

at Rose Bowl • Pasadena, CA

- Date: October 8, 2022
- Game time: 12:45 p.m.
- Game weather: Sunny, 89 °F (32 °C)
- Game attendance: 42,038
- Referee: Steven Strimling
- TV announcers (FOX): Tim Brando (play-by-play), Spencer Tillman (analyst)

Game information

First quarter

- (0:10) UCLA – Dorian Thompson-Robinson 7-yard run, Nicholas Barr-Mira kick (Drive: 7 plays, 97 yards, 3:20; UCLA 7–0)

Second quarter

- (10:00) UTAH – Jordan Noyes 23-yard field goal (Drive: 11 plays, 70 yards, 5:10; UCLA 7–3)
- (7:34) UCLA – Jake Bobo 7-yard pass from Dorian Thompson-Robinson, Nicholas Barr-Mira kick (Drive: 6 plays, 75 yards, 2:26; UCLA 14–3)
- (3:14) UTAH – Tavion Thomas 5-yard run, Jordan Noyes kick (Drive: 8 plays, 84 yards, 4:15; UCLA 14–10)

Third quarter

- (10:50) UCLA – Kam Brown 5-yard pass from Dorian Thompson-Robinson, Nicholas Barr-Mira kick (Drive: 9 plays, 43 yards, 4:03; UCLA 21–10)
- (5:01) UTAH – Cameron Rising 6-yard run, Cameron Rising two-point run (Drive: 11 plays, 75 yards, 5:49; UCLA 21–18)
- (1:07) UCLA – Jake Bobo 10-yard pass from Dorian Thompson-Robinson, Nicholas Barr-Mira kick (Drive: 8 plays, 75 yards, 3:45; UCLA 28–18)

Fourth quarter

- (11:39) UTAH – Cameron Rising 9-yard run, Jordan Noyes kick (Drive: 10 plays, 75 yards, 4:28; UCLA 28–25)
- (11:17) UCLA – Logan Loya 70-yard pass from Dorian Thompson-Robinson, Nicholas Barr-Mira kick (Drive: 2 plays, 61 yards, 0:15; UCLA 35–25)
- (9:26) UCLA – Zach Charbonnet 1-yard run, Nicholas Barr-Mira kick (Drive: 1 plays, 1 yards, 0:04; UCLA 42–25)
- (0:31) UTAH – Clark Phillips III 80-yard interception return, Jordan Noyes kick (Drive: 11 plays, 52 yards, 5:34; UCLA 42–32)

Statistics	UTAH	UCLA
First downs	31	21
Total yards	479	502
Rushes/yards	43–192	38–203
Passing yards	287	299
Passing: Comp–Att–Int	23–34–1	18–23–1
Time of possession	33:51	26:09

Team	Category	Player	Statistics
Utah	Passing	Cameron Rising	23/32, 287 yards, INT
Utah	Rushing	Tavion Thomas	18 carries, 91 yards, TD
Utah	Receiving	Devaughn Vele	6 receptions, 87 yards
UCLA	Passing	Dorian Thompson-Robinson	18/23, 299 yards, 4 TD, INT
UCLA	Rushing	Zach Charbonnet	22 carries, 198 yards, TD
UCLA	Receiving	Logan Loya	1 reception, 70 yards, TD

UCLA won 42–32 over No. 11 Utah, the highest-ranked opponent the Bruins had defeated under coach Kelly. Charbonnet finished with a career-high 198 yards rushing and a touchdown. Thompson-Robinson completed 76 career passing touchdowns, the most in UCLA history.

=== at No. 10 Oregon ===
No. 9 UCLA Bruins (6–0) at No. 10 Oregon Ducks (5–1) – Game summary

Quarter	1	2	3	4	Total
No. 9 Bruins	3	10	3	14	30
No. 10 Ducks	3	28	7	7	45

at Autzen Stadium • Eugene, OR

- Date: October 22, 2022
- Game time: 12:30 p.m.
- Game weather: Sunny, 56 °F (13 °C)
- Game attendance: 59,962
- Referee: Michael Mothershed
- TV announcers (FOX): Jason Benetti (play-by-play), Brock Huard (analyst), Allison Williams (sideline)

Game information

First quarter

- (10:36) ORE – Camden Lewis 44-yard field goal (Drive: 10 plays, 53 yards, 4:24; Oregon 3–0)
- (4:09) UCLA – Nicholas Barr-Mira 47-yard field goal (Drive: 14 plays, 46 yards, 6:27; Tied 3–3)

Second quarter

- (14:56) ORE – Terrance Ferguson 14-yard pass from Bo Nix, Camden Lewis kick (Drive: 10 plays, 71 yards, 4:13; Oregon 10–3)
- (12:38) UCLA – Keegan Jones 36-yard pass from Dorian Thompson-Robinson, Nicholas Barr-Mira kick (Drive: 7 plays, 75 yards, 2:18; Tied 10–10)
- (10:49) ORE – Troy Franklin 49-yard pass from Bo Nix, Camden Lewis kick (Drive: 5 plays, 75 yards, 1:49; Oregon 17–10)
- (6:34) ORE – Jordan James 2-yard run, Camden Lewis kick (Drive: 8 plays, 54 yards, 3:19; Oregon 24–10)
- (3:10) UCLA – Nicholas Barr-Mira 44-yard field goal (Drive: 8 plays, 49 yards, 4:20; Oregon 24–13)
- (0:06) ORE – Troy Franklin 2-yard pass from Bo Nix, Camden Lewis kick (Drive: 10 plays, 88 yards, 3:04; Oregon 31–13)

Third quarter

- (9:27) UCLA – Nicholas Barr-Mira 33-yard field goal (Drive: 13 plays, 53 yards, 5:33; Oregon 31–16)
- (1:52) ORE – Cam McCormick 17–yard pass from Bo Nix, Camden Lewis kick (Drive: 15 plays, 82 yards, 7:35; Oregon 38–16)

Fourth quarter

- (13:56) UCLA – Zach Charbonnet 1-yard run, Nicholas Barr-Mira kick (Drive: 10 plays, 69 yards, 2:56; Oregon 38–23)
- (11:37) ORE – Bucky Irving 37-yard pass from Bo Nix, Camden Lewis kick (Drive: 6 plays, 75 yards, 2:19; Oregon 45–23)
- (4:11) UCLA – Jake Bobo 22-yard pass from Dorian Thompson-Robinson, Nicholas Barr-Mira kick (Drive: 8 plays, 75 yards, 1:58; Oregon 45–30)

Statistics	UCLA	ORE
First downs	26	31
Total yards	448	545
Rushes/yards	30–186	46–262
Passing yards	262	283
Passing: Comp–Att–Int	27–39–1	22–28–0
Time of possession	26:33	33:27

Team	Category	Player	Statistics
UCLA	Passing	Dorian Thompson-Robinson	27/39, 262 yards, 2 TD, INT
UCLA	Rushing	Zach Charbonnet	20 carries, 151 yards, TD
UCLA	Receiving	Jake Bobo	8 receptions, 101 yards, TD
Oregon	Passing	Bo Nix	22/28, 283 yards, 5 TD
Oregon	Rushing	Bucky Irving	19 carries, 107 yards
Oregon	Receiving	Troy Franklin	8 receptions, 132 yards, 2 TD

UCLA lost 45–30 to No. 10 Oregon for their first loss of the season. After going up 17–10 in the second quarter, the Ducks recovered an onside kick, a play they had practiced all week after spotting an opening in the Bruins' kickoff coverage. Oregon proceeded to score another touchdown to lead 24–10.

=== vs Stanford ===
Stanford Cardinal (3–4) vs No. 12 UCLA Bruins (6–1) – Game summary

Quarter	1	2	3	4	Total
Cardinal	3	3	0	7	13
No. 12 Bruins	14	10	7	7	38

at Rose Bowl • Pasadena, CA

- Date: October 29, 2022
- Game time: 7:30 p.m. PT
- Game weather: Clear, 66 °F (19 °C)
- Game attendance: 43,850
- Referee: Chris Coyle
- TV announcers (ESPN): Mike Monaco (play-by-play), Rod Gilmore (analyst), Lauren Sisler (sideline), Todd McShay (sideline)

Game information

First quarter

- (10:35) STAN – Joshua Karty 22-yard field goal (Drive: 11 plays, 61 yards, 4:25; Stanford 3–0)
- (6:05) UCLA – Dorian Thompson-Robinson 3-yard run, Nicholas Barr-Mira kick (Drive: 12 plays, 75 yards, 4:30; UCLA 7–3)
- (5:45) UCLA – Zach Charbonnet 23-yard run, Nicholas Barr-Mira kick (Drive: 1 plays, 23 yards, 0:06; UCLA 14–3)

Second quarter

- (12:57) UCLA – Nicholas Barr-Mira 31-yard field goal (Drive: 13 plays, 73 yards, 4:16; UCLA 17–3)
- (4:26) UCLA – Zach Charbonnet 1-yard run, Nicholas Barr-Mira kick (Drive: 11 plays, 80 yards, 5:34; UCLA 24–3)
- (1:23) STAN – Joshua Karty 49-yard field goal (Drive: 4 plays, 1 yards, 1:32; UCLA 24–6)

Third quarter

- (0:03) UCLA – Zach Charbonnet 37-yard run, Nicholas Barr-Mira kick (Drive: 8 plays, 58 yards, 3:13; UCLA 31–6)

Fourth quarter

- (10:29) UCLA – Kazmeir Allen 72-yard run, Nicholas Barr-Mira kick (Drive: 6 plays, 99 yards, 2:40; UCLA 38–6)
- (4:11) STAN – Benjamin Yurosek 2-yard pass from Tanner McKee, Joshua Karty kick (Drive: 14 plays, 75 yards, 6:18; UCLA 38–13)

Statistics	STAN	UCLA
First downs	18	26
Total yards	270	523
Rushes/yards	34–145	45–324
Passing yards	125	199
Passing: Comp–Att–Int	15–31–1	18–29–0
Time of possession	31:27	28:33

Team	Category	Player	Statistics
Stanford	Passing	Tanner McKee	13/29, 115 yards, TD, INT
Stanford	Rushing	Ashton Daniels	5 carries, 51 yards
Stanford	Receiving	Benjamin Yurosek	5 receptions, 32 yards, TD
UCLA	Passing	Dorian Thompson-Robinson	18/29, 299 yards
UCLA	Rushing	Zach Charbonnet	21 carries, 198 yards, 3 TD
UCLA	Receiving	Zach Charbonnet	5 receptions, 61 yards

=== at Arizona State ===
No. 12 UCLA Bruins (7–1) at Arizona State Sun Devils (3–5) – Game summary

Quarter	1	2	3	4	Total
No. 12 Bruins	14	14	14	8	50
Sun Devils	10	0	15	11	36

at Sun Devil Stadium • Tempe, AZ

- Date: November 5, 2022
- Game time: 7:40 pm
- Game weather: Clear, 70 °F (21 °C)
- Game attendance: 51,265
- Referee: Francisco Villar
- TV announcers (FS1): Noah Eagle (play-by-play), Mark Helfrich (analyst)

Game information

First quarter

- (11:19) ASU – Carter Brown 25-yard field goal (Drive: 8 plays, 33 yards, 3:33; Arizona State 3–0)
- (8:54) UCLA – Dorian Thompson-Robinson 14-yard run, Nicholas Barr-Mira kick (Drive: 7 plays, 75 yards, 2:25; UCLA 7–3)
- (2:41) ASU – Messiah Swinson 3-yard pass from Trenton Bourguet, Carter Brown kick (Drive: 12 plays, 75 yards, 6:07; Arizona State 10–7)
- (0:32) UCLA – Keegan Jones 3-yard pass from Dorian Thompson-Robinson, Nicholas Barr-Mira kick (Drive: 5 plays, 77 yards, 2:01; UCLA 14–10)

Second quarter

- (9:43) UCLA – Keegan Jones 10-yard run, Nicholas Barr-Mira kick (Drive: 5 plays, 91 yards, 1:43; UCLA 21–10)
- (0:33) UCLA – Michael Ezeike 9-yard pass from Dorian Thompson-Robinson, Nicholas Barr-Mira kick (Drive: 16 plays, 90 yards, 5:48; UCLA 28–10)

Third quarter

- (10:03) UCLA – Dorian Thompson-Robinson 4-yard run, Nicholas Barr-Mira kick (Drive: 10 plays, 65 yards, 3:16; UCLA 35–10)
- (6:15) ASU – Elijhah Badger 7-yard pass from Trenton Bourguet, Trenton Bourguet two-point pass to Xazavian Valladay (Drive: 8 plays, 75 yards, 3:48; UCLA 35–18)
- (6:03) UCLA – Kazmeir Allen 75-yard run, Nicholas Barr-Mira kick (Drive: 1 plays, 75 yards, 0:12; UCLA 42–18)
- (0:30) ASU – Xazavian Valladay 1-yard run, Carter Brown kick (Drive: 10 plays, 75 yards, 5:33; UCLA 42–25)

Fourth quarter

- (11:09) ASU – Carter Brown 36-yard field goal (Drive: 7 plays, 36 yards, 3:22; UCLA 42–28)
- (6:24) ASU – Xazavian Valladay 1-yard run, Trenton Bourguet two-point pass to Andre Johnson (Drive: 8 plays, 69 yards, 2:34; UCLA 42–36)
- (2:30) UCLA – Colson Yankoff 1-yard run, Dorian Thompson-Robinson two-point pass to Titus Mokiao-Atimalala (Drive: 7 plays, 74 yards, 3:48; UCLA 50–36)

Statistics	UCLA	ASU
First downs	24	30
Total yards	571	468
Rushes/yards	42–402	31–119
Passing yards	169	349
Passing: Comp–Att–Int	13–20–1	38–49–1
Time of possession	23:48	36:12

Team	Category	Player	Statistics
UCLA	Passing	Dorian Thompson-Robinson	13/20, 169 yards, 2 TD, INT
UCLA	Rushing	Kazmeir Allen	11 carries, 137 yards, TD
UCLA	Receiving	Jake Bobo	3 receptions, 64 yards
Arizona State	Passing	Trenton Bourguet	38/49, 349 yards, 2 TD, INT
Arizona State	Rushing	Xazavian Valladay	20 carries, 92 yards, 2 TD
Arizona State	Receiving	Xazavian Valladay	10 receptions, 89 yards

=== vs Arizona ===
Arizona Wildcats (3–6) vs No. 12 UCLA Bruins (8–1) – Game summary

Quarter	1	2	3	4	Total
Wildcats	14	7	0	13	34
No. 12 Bruins	0	14	7	7	28

at Rose Bowl • Pasadena, CA

- Date: November 12, 2022
- Game time: 7:30 p.m.
- Game weather: Clear, 58 °F (14 °C)
- Game attendance: 44,430
- Referee: Matthew Richards
- TV announcers (FOX): Noah Eagle (play-by-play), Mark Helfrich (analyst)

Game information

First quarter

- (8:47) ARIZ – Michael Wiley 10-yard run, Tyler Loop kick (Drive: 7 plays, 55 yards, 3:15; Arizona 7–0)
- (3:50) ARIZ – Michael Wiley 22-yard pass from Jayden de Laura, Tyler Loop kick (Drive: 7 plays, 63 yards, 3:01; Arizona 14–0)

Second quarter

- (13:12) UCLA – Zach Charbonnet 1-yard run, Nicholas Barr-Mira kick (Drive: 12 plays, 73 yards, 4:42; Arizona 14–7)
- (8:11) UCLA – Hudson Habermehl 51-yard pass from Dorian Thompson-Robinson, Nicholas Barr-Mira kick (Drive: 5 plays, 99 yards, 1:34; Tied 14–14)
- (2:01) ARIZ – Jayden de Laura 3-yard run, Tyler Loop kick (Drive: 10 plays, 75 yards, 6:10; Arizona 21–14)

Third quarter

- (3:38) UCLA – Zach Charbonnet 1-yard run, Nicholas Barr-Mira kick (Drive: 12 plays, 89 yards, 4:40; Tied 21–21)

Fourth quarter

- (13:20) ARIZ – Tyler Loop 35-yard field goal (Drive: 10 plays, 57 yards, 5:18; Arizona 24–21)
- (10:22) UCLA – Zach Charbonnet 5-yard run, Nicholas Barr-Mira kick (Drive: 9 plays, 65 yards, 2:58; UCLA 28–24)
- (6:34) ARIZ – Tetairoa McMillan 17-yard pass from Jayden de Laura, Tyler Loop kick (Drive: 8 plays, 82 yards, 3:41; Arizona 31–28)
- (1:07) ARIZ – Tyler Loop 23-yard field goal (Drive: 9 plays, 30 yards, 4:40; Arizona 34–28)

Statistics	ARIZ	UCLA
First downs	22	26
Total yards	436	465
Rushes/yards	36–124	37–220
Passing yards	312	245
Passing: Comp–Att–Int	23–29–0	26–39–0
Time of possession	34:20	25:40

Team	Category	Player	Statistics
Arizona	Passing	Jayden de Laura	22/28, 315 yards, 2 TD,
Arizona	Rushing	Michael Wiley	21 carries, 97 yards, TD
Arizona	Receiving	Jacob Cowing	9 receptions, 118 yards
UCLA	Passing	Dorian Thompson-Robinson	26/39, 245 yards, TD
UCLA	Rushing	Zach Charbonnet	24 carries, 181 yards, 3 TD
UCLA	Receiving	Hudson Habermehl	3 receptions, 64 yards, TD

UCLA lost 34–28 to Arizona, who entered the game as 19 1/2-point underdogs. The Bruins surrendered 436 total yards and 6.7 yards per play to the Wildcats. UCLA had a chance to comeback on the final play of the game on 4th-and-10 from the Arizona 29-yard line. A scrambling Thompson-Robinson threw under pressure to an open Jake Bobo, who dove but was unable to catch the ball in the end zone.

UCLA played without running back-receiver Kazmeir Allen, who was out due to injury. Their streak of nine consecutive wins against unranked teams ended, while Arizona halted their eight-game road losing streak against ranked teams.

=== vs No. 7 USC ===
No. 7 USC Trojans (9–1) vs No. 16 UCLA Bruins (8–2) – Game summary

Quarter	1	2	3	4	Total
No. 7 Trojans	0	20	14	14	48
No. 16 Bruins	14	7	10	14	45

at Rose Bowl • Pasadena, CA

- Date: November 19, 2022
- Game time: 5:00 p.m.
- Game weather: Clear, 66 °F (19 °C)
- Game attendance: 70,865
- Referee: Steven Strimling
- TV announcers (Fox): Gus Johnson (play-by-play), Joel Klatt (analyst), Allison Williams (sideline)

Game information

First quarter

- (3:07) UCLA – Dorian Thompson-Robinson 1-yard run, Nicholas Barr-Mira kick (Drive: 14 plays, 80 yards, 4:59; UCLA 7–0)
- (2:05) UCLA – Michael Ezeike 30-yard pass from Dorian Thompson-Robinson, Nicholas Barr-Mira kick (Drive: 1 play, 30 yards, 0:18; UCLA 14-0)

Second quarter

- (12:46) USC – Caleb Williams 6-yard run, Denis Lynch kick (Drive: 10 plays, 75 yards, 4:55; UCLA 14–7)
- (6:27) USC – Denis Lynch 44-yard field goal (Drive: 7 plays, 72 yards, 2:41; UCLA 14–10)
- (4:26) UCLA – Dorian Thompson-Robinson 1-yard run, Nicholas Barr-Mira kick (Drive: 6 plays, 63 yards, 1:57; UCLA 21–10)
- (2:28) USC – Austin Jones 8-yard run, Denis Lynch kick (Drive: 5 plays, 79 yards, 2:06; UCLA 21–17)
- (0:01) USC – Denis Lynch 49-yard field goal (Drive: 3 plays, 15 yards, 0:20; UCLA 21–20)

Third quarter

- (10:55) UCLA – Nicholas Barr-Mira 46-yard field goal (Drive: 11 plays, 47 yards, 4:05; UCLA 24–20)
- (9:16) USC – Jordan Addison 35-yard pass from Caleb Williams, Denis Lynch kick (Drive: 4 plays, 65 yards, 1:42; USC 27-24)
- (7:24) USC – Austin Jones 2-yard run, Denis Lynch kick (Drive: 2 plays, 9 yards, 0:48; USC 34–24)
- (4:32) UCLA – Michael Ezeike 6-yard pass from Dorian Thompson-Robinson, Nicholas Barr-Mira kick (Drive: 8 plays, 85 yards, 2:50; USC 34-31)

Fourth quarter

- (15:00) USC – Kyle Ford 16-yard pass from Caleb Williams, Denis Lynch kick (Drive: 8 plays, 75 yards, 3:55; USC 41-31)
- (14:51) UCLA – Kazmeir Allen 55-yard pass from Dorian Thompson-Robinson, Nicholas Barr-Mira kick (Drive: 1 play, 55 yards, 0:16; USC 41-38)
- (10:01) USC – Darwin Barlow 6-yard run, Denis Lynch kick (Drive: 10 plays, 75 yards, 5:25; USC 48–38)
- (7:15) UCLA – Michael Ezeike 3-yard pass from Dorian Thompson-Robinson, Nicholas Barr-Mira kick (Drive: 8 plays, 75 yards, 2:32; USC 48-45)

Statistics	USC	UCLA
First downs	30	27
Total yards	648	507
Rushes/yards	38–178	37–198
Passing yards	470	309
Passing: Comp–Att–Int	32–43–1	23–38–3
Time of possession	35:20	24:40

Team	Category	Player	Statistics
USC	Passing	Caleb Williams	32/43, 470 yards, 2 TD, INT
USC	Rushing	Austin Jones	21 carries, 120 yards, 2 TD
USC	Receiving	Jordan Addison	11 receptions, 178 yards, TD
UCLA	Passing	Dorian Thompson-Robinson	23/38, 309 yards, 4 TD, 3 INT
UCLA	Rushing	Zach Charbonnet	19 carries, 95 yards
UCLA	Receiving	Jake Bobo	4 receptions, 76 yards

UCLA was eliminated from conference championship contention after losing 48–45 to No. 7 USC. The Trojans gained 649 yards, the most the Bruins have allowed since giving up 720 yards to Washington State in 2019. USC quarterback Caleb Williams had 503 yards of total offense, passing for 470 yards and two touchdowns and rushing for another. Thompson-Robinson threw for four touchdowns and also ran for two others, but he committed four turnovers, with the last of his three interceptions ending the game.

UCLA jumped ahead 14–0 in the game, and held a 21–20 lead at halftime. The teams exchanged touchdowns in the second half, ending the game with a combined 93 points, five turnovers and over 1,000 yards on offense. It was the first game in the history of their crosstown rivalry that both teams started Black quarterbacks. It was the first time that both teams were ranked entering the matchup since 2014.

=== at California ===
No. 18 UCLA Bruins (8–3) at California Golden Bears (4–7) – Game summary

Quarter	1	2	3	4	Total
No. 18 Bruins	7	10	7	11	35
Golden Bears	7	14	0	7	28

at California Memorial Stadium • Berkeley, CA

- Date: November 25, 2022
- Game time: 1:40 p.m.
- Game weather: Sunny, 67 °F (19 °C)
- Game attendance: 36,221
- Referee: Michael Mothershed
- TV announcers (FOX): Dan Hellie (play-by-play), Petros Papadakis (play-by-play)

Game information

First quarter

- (7:04) UCLA – Jake Bobo 5-yard pass from Dorian Thompson-Robinson, Nicholas Barr-Mira kick (Drive: 8 plays, 55 yards, 3:10; UCLA 7–0)
- (0:16) CAL – J. Michael Sturdivant 46-yard pass from Jack Plummer, Dario Longhetto kick (Drive: 7 plays, 80 yards, 2:59; Tied 7–7)

Second quarter

- (9:33) UCLA – Nicholas Barr-Mira 23-yard field goal (Drive: 15 plays, 65 yards, 5:36; UCLA 10–7)
- (4:37) CAL – Jeremiah Hunter 38-yard pass from Jack Plummer, Dario Longhetto (Drive: 8 plays, 83 yards, 4:50; California 14–10)
- (0:58) CAL – Jeremiah Hunter 22-yard pass from Jack Plummer, Dario Longhetto (Drive: 4 plays, 44 yards, 1:37; California 21–10)
- (0:18) UCLA – Dorian Thompson-Robinson 19-yard run, Nicholas Barr-Mira kick (Drive: 5 plays, 75 yards, 0:40; California 21–17)

Third quarter

- (7:06) UCLA – Dorian Thompson-Robinson 14-yard run, Nicholas Barr-Mira kick (Drive: 12 plays, 90 yards, 4:11; UCLA 24–21)

Fourth quarter

- (14:01) UCLA – Nicholas Barr-Mira 26-yard field goal (Drive: 9 plays, 35 yards, 4:45; UCLA 27–21)
- (11:16) CAL – Jaydn Ott 8-yard pass from Jack Plummer, Dario Longhetto (Drive: 5 plays, 82 yards, 2:40; California 28–27)
- (7:53) UCLA – Zach Charbonnet 5-yard run, Dorian Thompson-Robinson two-point pass to Jake Bobo (Drive: 10 plays, 73 yards, 3:16; UCLA 35–28)

Statistics	UCLA	CAL
First downs	33	15
Total yards	541	361
Rushes/yards	64–352	18–67
Passing yards	189	294
Passing: Comp–Att–Int	21–30–0	24–34–0
Time of possession	36:50	23:10

Team	Category	Player	Statistics
UCLA	Passing	Dorian Thompson-Robinson	21/30, 189 yards, TD
UCLA	Rushing	Zach Charbonnet	24 carries, 119 yards, TD
UCLA	Receiving	Jake Bobo	7 receptions, 62 yards, TD
California	Passing	Jack Plummer	24/34, 294 yards, 4 TD
California	Rushing	Jaydn Ott	13 carries, 55 yards
California	Receiving	Jeremiah Hunter	8 receptions, 153 yards, 2 TD

=== vs Pittsburgh (Sun Bowl) ===
Pittsburgh Panthers (8-4) vs No. 18 UCLA Bruins (9-3) – Game summary
(2022 Sun Bowl)

Quarter	1	2	3	4	Total
Panthers	6	8	7	16	37
No. 18 Bruins	7	14	7	7	35

at Sun Bowl • El Paso, TX

- Date: December 30, 2022
- Game time: 1:00 p.m. CST
- Game weather: Partly cloudy, 55 °F (13 °C)
- Game attendance: 41,104
- Referee: Derek Anderson
- TV announcers (CBS): Brad Nessler (play-by-play), Gary Danielson (analyst), Jenny Dell (sideline)

Game information

First quarter

- (8:05) PITT – Ben Sauls 22-yard field goal (Drive: 13 plays, 71 yards, 6:55; Pittsburgh 3–0)
- (5:15) UCLA – Logan Loya 11-yard pass from Dorian Thompson-Robinson, Nicholas Barr-Mira kick (Drive: 7 plays, 74 yards, 2:50; UCLA 7–3)
- (0:00) PITT – Ben Sauls 49-yard field goal (Drive: 11 plays, 47 yards, 5:14; UCLA 7–6)

Second quarter

- (11:57) UCLA – Dorian Thompson-Robinson 1-yard run, Nicholas Barr-Mira kick (Drive: 8 plays, 75 yards, 3:03; UCLA 14–6)
- (3:49) PITT – Bub Means 15-yard pass from Nick Patti, Nick Patti two-point pass to Konata Mumpfield (Drive: 9 plays, 94 yards, 4:21; Tied 14–14)
- (0:57) UCLA – Titus Mokiao-Atimalala 28-yard pass from Dorian Thompson-Robinson, Nicholas Barr-Mira kick (Drive: 8 plays, 75 yards, 2:52; UCLA 21–14)

Third quarter

- (8:45) UCLA – Jaylin Davies 52-yard interception return, Nicholas Barr-Mira kick (Drive: 2 plays, 6 yards, 0:55; UCLA 28–14)
- (3:04) PITT – Rodney Hammond Jr. 1-yard run, Ben Sauls kick (Drive: 11 plays, 75 yards, 5:41; UCLA 28–21)

Fourth quarter

- (12:44) PITT – Rodney Hammond Jr. 7-yard run, Ben Sauls kick (Drive: 5 plays, 18 yards, 1:57; Tied 28–28)
- (10:38) PITT – Ben Sauls 31-yard field goal (Drive: 6 plays, 7 yards, 2:06; Pittsburgh 31–28)
- (4:24) PITT – Ben Sauls 27-yard field goal (Drive: 11 plays, 41 yards, 4:24; Pittsburgh 34–28)
- (0:34) UCLA – T. J. Harden 8-yard run, Nicholas Barr-Mira kick (Drive: 8 plays, 70 yards, 1:27; UCLA 35–34)
- (0:04) PITT – Ben Sauls 47-yard field goal (Drive: 6 plays, 46 yards, 0:30; Pittsburgh 37–35)

Statistics	PITT	UCLA
First downs	27	19
Total yards	443	451
Rushes/yards	46–203	27–141
Passing yards	240	310
Passing: Comp–Att–Int	21–43–1	22–33–4
Time of possession	37:03	22:57

Team	Category	Player	Statistics
Pittsburgh	Passing	Nick Patti	20/41, 224 yards, TD, INT
Pittsburgh	Rushing	Rodney Hammond Jr.	25 carries, 93 yards, 2 TD
Pittsburgh	Receiving	Bub Means	4 receptions, 84 yards, TD
UCLA	Passing	Dorian Thompson-Robinson	16/24, 271 yards, 2 TD, 3 INT
UCLA	Rushing	T. J. Harden	11 carries, 111 yards, TD
UCLA	Receiving	Kam Brown	4 receptions, 115 yards

== Rankings ==
Ranking movements Legend: ██ Increase in ranking ██ Decrease in ranking — = Not ranked RV = Received votes
	Week															
Poll	Pre	1	2	3	4	5	6	7	8	9	10	11	12	13	14	Final
AP	RV	RV	—	—	RV	18	11	9	12	10	9	16	17	17	18	21
Coaches	RV	RV	RV	—	RV	19	12	10	15	11	10	16	18	17	18	21
CFP	Not released									12	12	16	18	17	18	Not released

== Players drafted into the NFL ==
Round	Pick	Player	Position	NFL Club
2	52	Zach Charbonnet	RB	Seattle Seahawks
4	122	Jon Gaines II	OL	Arizona Cardinals
5	140	Dorian Thompson-Robinson	QB	Cleveland Browns
5	144	Atonio Mafi	OG	New England Patriots

== Statistics ==
Updated through November 20, 2022

Statistics	OPP	UCLA
First downs	254	282
Plays–yards	789–4437	779–5553
Rushes–yards	380–1423	422–2604
Passing yards	3014	2949
Passing: comp–att–int	273–409–10	249–357–8
Turnovers		
Time of possession	33:03 / game	27:13 / game

== Awards and honors ==
Recipient	Award (PAC-12 Conference)	Week #	Date awarded	Ref.
Nicholas Barr-Mira	Special teams Player of the Week	3	9/19/22	
Laiatu Latu	Defensive Player of the Week	4	9/26/22	
Dorian Thompson-Robinson	Offensive Player of the Week	5	10/3/22	
Dorian Thompson-Robinson	Offensive Player of the Week	6	10/10/22	
Jon Gaines II	Offensive line Player of the Week	10	10/7/22	

- September 28 – Shea Pitts is a semifinalist for the 2022 William V. Campbell Trophy
- September 30 – Dorian Thompson-Robinson a Top 25 candidates, Johnny Unitas Golden Arm Award
- October 12 – Laiatu Latu is listed on the 2022 Comeback Player of the Year Award watch list
- October 19 – Head coach Chip Kelly was named to the Bobby Dodd Coach of the Year Award watch list
- November 1 – Dorian Thompson-Robinson was named the Davey O'Brien National Quarterback Award QB Class
- November 1 – Zach Charbonnet was the Doak Walker National Running Back of the Week and the Rose Bowl Game Pac-12 Player of the Week; Zach Charbonnet was named a semifinalist for the Maxwell Award
- November 8 – Kazmeir Allen named to the Paul Hornung Award Honor Roll
- November 14 – Jack Landherr IV named the Patrick Mannelly Award semifinalist
- November 15 – Coach DeShaun Foster is placed on the Broyles Award list; Dorian Thompson-Robinson is a Davey O'Brien Award semifinalist; Offensive unit is a Joe Moore Award semifinalist
- November 16 – Zach Charbonnet is a Walter Camp Player of the Year Award semifinalist
- November 22 – Zach Charbonnet is a 2022 Doak Walker National Collegiate Running Back Award semifinalist
- December 9 – Zach Charbonnet is named to the First Team FWAA All-American, the Associated Press College Football All-America second team
- December 20 – Jake Bobo named to the First Team Academic All-American; Laiatu Latu is a 2022 College Football Comeback Player of the Year Award winner
