= Bill McGovern (American football) =

American football coach (1962–2023)

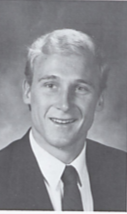
- McGovern at College of the Holy Cross c. 1985

Personal information
- Born: December 31, 1962; Oradell, New Jersey, U.S.
- Died: May 30, 2023 (aged 60); California, U.S.

Career information
- High school: Bergen Catholic (Oradell)
- College: Holy Cross
- NFL draft: 1985: undrafted

Career history
- Penn (1985) Freshman coach; Holy Cross (1986–1987) Assistant defensive backs coach; UMass (1988–1990) Defensive backs coach; Holy Cross (1991–1992) Defensive backs coach/kickers coach; UMass (1993) Defensive coordinator; Boston College (1994–1996) Defensive backs coach; Pittsburgh (1997–1999) Defensive backs coach; Boston College (2000–2008) Linebackers coach; Boston College (2009–2012) Defensive coordinator/linebackers coach; Philadelphia Eagles (2013–2015) Outside linebackers coach; New York Giants (2016–2018) Linebackers coach; New York Giants (2019) Inside linebackers coach; Nebraska (2020) Defensive assistant; Chicago Bears (2021) Inside linebackers coach; UCLA (2022) Defensive coordinator; UCLA (2023) Director of football administration

William E. McGovern (December 31, 1962 – May 30, 2023) was an American college and professional football coach. A defensive coach for almost 40 years, his longest stint was with Boston College, serving 13 years from 2000 to 2012 as their linebackers coach and later as defensive coordinator. He was also a linebackers coach for eight years in the National Football League (NFL) with the Philadelphia Eagles, New York Giants, and Chicago Bears.

McGovern played as a defensive back in college for the Holy Cross Crusaders. He set NCAA Division I-AA career and single-season records for interceptions and was named an All-American.

== Early life and amateur career ==
McGovern was born in Oradell, New Jersey, on December 31, 1962. He was the older brother of Rob McGovern, who played four seasons in the NFL. He attended Bergen Catholic High School in Oradell, and helped lead the Crusaders football team to a state championship. The Record named him to their All-Century team as a defensive back.

McGovern attended the College of the Holy Cross, where he was a four-year starter for the Crusaders at defensive back. A two-time first-team all-conference selection in the Eastern Collegiate Athletic Conference, he set a Division I-AA career record with 24 interceptions. In his senior year in 1984, McGovern set a Division I-AA single-season record with 11 interceptions and was named a consensus first-team Division I-AA All-American. He was named to the Holy Cross Hall of Fame in 1996.

== Coaching career ==
McGovern began his coaching career with Penn as freshman coach in 1985. The following year, he returned to his alma mater after his former coach Rick Carter asked him to join his staff, but Carter died by suicide before the season. McGovern served at Holy Cross from 1986 to 1987 and 1991 to 1992 as assistant defensive backs coach and defensive backs coach, respectively. He was with Massachusetts from 1988 to 1990 as defensive backs coach and 1993 as defensive coordinator. McGovern joined the Boston College Eagles in 1994, and he was succeeded by Massachusetts linebackers coach Jerry Azzinaro as Minutemen defensive coordinator. From 1994 to 1996, McGovern was the Eagles' defensive backs coach, and Azzinaro joined the staff in 1995 as the defensive line coach. McGovern was later the defensive backs coach for Pittsburgh from 1997 to 1999.

McGovern returned to Boston College as linebackers coach for nine years from 2000 to 2008, before being promoted to defensive coordinator. As defensive coordinator from 2009 to 2012, he coached future NFL linebackers Mark Herzlich and Luke Kuechly. The Eagles' defense ranked as high as No. 13 in total defense in 2010, before a steep drop in his final two seasons. During this 13-year stint with Boston College, they appeared in a bowl game in each of his first 11 seasons, winning eight.

In 2013, McGovern moved to the NFL, joining the Philadelphia Eagles as the outside linebackers coach on head coach Chip Kelly's staff, which included Jerry Azzinaro as the defensive line coach. McGovern developed Connor Barwin into one of the league's top pass rushers with 14 1/2 sacks in 2014, and he transitioned Brandon Graham from defensive end to linebacker under defensive coordinator Billy Davis's 3–4 defense. After Kelly and his staff were fired following the 2015 season, McGovern was hired as linebackers coach for the New York Giants in 2016. After the firing of coach Ben McAdoo, McGovern was retained in his role by new head coach Pat Shurmur in 2018. After returning to coaching at the college level and spending 2020 as a defensive assistant with Nebraska, McGovern was hired by the Chicago Bears as the inside linebackers coach under new defensive coordinator Sean Desai on January 30, 2021. He was not retained after the Bears fired head coach Matt Nagy.

On February 16, 2022, McGovern re-united with Chip Kelly, who hired him as the defensive coordinator for the UCLA Bruins. He replaced Azzinaro and was tasked with improving a Bruins defense that had struggled during Kelly's tenure. Through the first seven games in 2022, the defense's performance was encouraging, surrendering 25.9 points per game as UCLA went 6–1 and was ranked as high as No. 9 nationally. However, McGovern missed the next five games while dealing with cancer, and the defense regressed, allowing 31.8 points per game. He returned for the 2022 Sun Bowl, in which the Bruins gave up 20 consecutive points and lost 37–35 to Pittsburgh after a late field goal. After the season, McGovern transitioned to an administrative role, while D'Anton Lynn was hired as the new defensive coordinator.

== Death ==
McGovern died from cancer at home in Southern California, on May 30, 2023, at age 60.
