= 2022 Pittsburgh Panthers football team =

American college football season

2022 Pittsburgh Panthers football

Sun Bowl champion

Sun Bowl, W 37–35 vs. UCLA
- Conference: Atlantic Coast Conference
- Coastal Division

Ranking
- Coaches: No. 22
- AP: No. 22
- Record: 9–4 (5–3 ACC)
- Head coach: Pat Narduzzi (8th season)
- Offensive coordinator: Frank Cignetti Jr. (1st season)
- Offensive scheme: Pro-style
- Defensive coordinator: Randy Bates (5th season)
- Base defense: 4–3
- Home stadium: Acrisure Stadium

Uniform
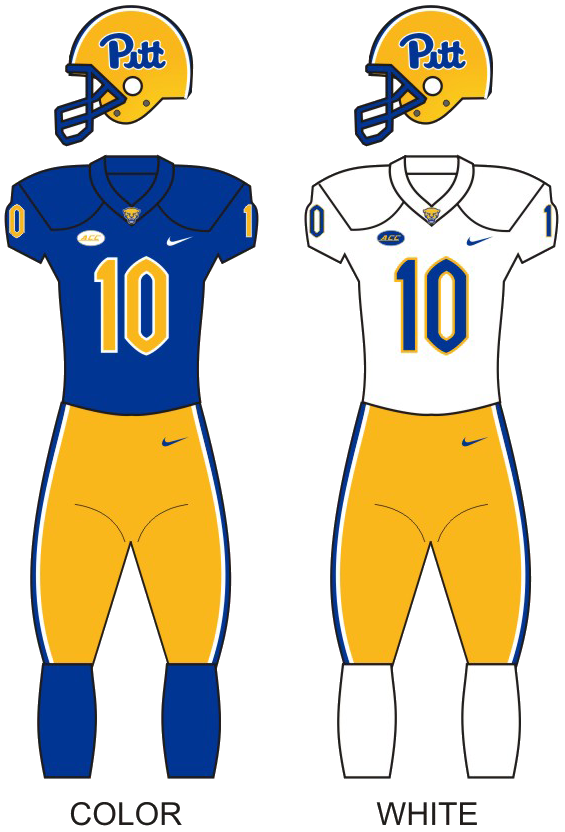

2022 Atlantic Coast Conference football standings
| | Conf. | | | Overall |
| Team | W | | L | W | | L |
|---|---|---|---|---|---|---|
Atlantic Division
| No. 13 Clemson xy$ | 8 | – | 0 | 11 | – | 3 |
| No. 11 Florida State | 5 | – | 3 | 10 | – | 3 |
| Louisville | 4 | – | 4 | 8 | – | 5 |
| NC State | 4 | – | 4 | 8 | – | 5 |
| Syracuse | 4 | – | 4 | 7 | – | 6 |
| Wake Forest | 3 | – | 5 | 8 | – | 5 |
| Boston College | 2 | – | 6 | 3 | – | 9 |
Coastal Division
| North Carolina xy | 6 | – | 2 | 9 | – | 5 |
| Duke | 5 | – | 3 | 9 | – | 4 |
| No. 22 Pittsburgh | 5 | – | 3 | 9 | – | 4 |
| Georgia Tech | 4 | – | 4 | 5 | – | 7 |
| Miami (FL) | 3 | – | 5 | 5 | – | 7 |
| Virginia | 1 | – | 6 | 3 | – | 7 |
| Virginia Tech | 1 | – | 6 | 3 | – | 8 |
Championship: Clemson 39, North Carolina 10
$ – Conference champion; x – Division champion/co-champions; y – Championship game participant; Rankings from AP Poll

The 2022 Pittsburgh Panthers football team represented the University of Pittsburgh as a member of the Coastal Division of the Atlantic Coast Conference (ACC) during the 2022 NCAA Division I FBS football season. The Panthers were led by eighth-year head coach Pat Narduzzi and played their home games at Acrisure Stadium in Pittsburgh. This was Pitt's tenth season as a member of the ACC.

== Offseason ==
=== 2022 NFL draft ===
==== Pitt players drafted into the NFL ====
| Round | Pick | Player | Position | NFL Club |
|---|---|---|---|---|
| 1 | 20 | Kenny Pickett | QB | Pittsburgh Steelers |
| 4 | 115 | Damarri Mathis | CB | Denver Broncos |

==== Undrafted NFL free agents ====
| Player | Position | NFL Club |
|---|---|---|
| Cal Adomitis | LS | Cincinnati Bengals |
| Lucas Krull | TE | New Orleans Saints |
| Taysir Mack | WR | San Francisco 49ers |

=== Recruiting class ===
The Panthers have signed a total of 12 student-athletes on Early National Signing Day (December 2021)

==== Recruits ====
College recruiting
| Name | Hometown | School | Height | Weight | Commit date |
|---|---|---|---|---|---|
| Ryland Gandy; CB | Buford, GA | Buford High School | 6 ft 0 in (1.83 m) | 170 lb (77 kg) | Jun 16, 2021 |
| Ryland Gandy; CB | Recruit ratings: Rivals: 247Sports: ESPN: (80) | | | | |
| Ryan Baer; OT | Eastlake, OH | North High School | 6 ft 7 in (2.01 m) | 320 lb (150 kg) | Aug 5, 2021 |
| Ryan Baer; OT | Recruit ratings: Rivals: 247Sports: ESPN: (80) | | | | |
| Che Nwabuko; ATH | Manor, TX | Manor High School | 5 ft 10 in (1.78 m) | 175 lb (79 kg) | Jun 27, 2021 |
| Che Nwabuko; ATH | Recruit ratings: Rivals: 247Sports: ESPN: (78) | | | | |
| Marquan Pope; S | Denton, TX | John H. Guyer High School | 6 ft 2 in (1.88 m) | 200 lb (91 kg) | Jun 26, 2021 |
| Marquan Pope; S | Recruit ratings: Rivals: 247Sports: ESPN: (77) | | | | |
| Jordaan Bailey; RB | Tampa, FL | Hillsborough High School | 6 ft 1 in (1.85 m) | 180 lb (82 kg) | Dec 15, 2021 |
| Jordaan Bailey; RB | Recruit ratings: Rivals: 247Sports: ESPN: (77) | | | | |
| Samuel Okunlola; DE | Brockton, MA | Thayer Academy | 6 ft 4 in (1.93 m) | 225 lb (102 kg) | Dec 15, 2021 |
| Samuel Okunlola; DE | Recruit ratings: Rivals: 247Sports: ESPN: (77) | | | | |
| Jimmy Scott; DE | Athol Springs, NY | Saint Francis High School | 6 ft 3 in (1.91 m) | 255 lb (116 kg) | Jun 14, 2021 |
| Jimmy Scott; DE | Recruit ratings: Rivals: 247Sports: ESPN: (74) | | | | |
| Isaiah Montgomery; OT | Virginia Beach, VA | Landstown High School | 6 ft 5 in (1.96 m) | 280 lb (130 kg) | Jun 29, 2021 |
| Isaiah Montgomery; OT | Recruit ratings: Rivals: 247Sports: ESPN: (76) | | | | |
| Sean Fitzsimmons; DT | Monaca, PA | Central Valley High School | 6 ft 3 in (1.91 m) | 275 lb (125 kg) | Apr 9, 2021 |
| Sean Fitzsimmons; DT | Recruit ratings: Rivals: 247Sports: ESPN: (76) | | | | |
| Addison Copeland; WR | Buffalo, NY | Western New York Maritime School | 6 ft 2 in (1.88 m) | 185 lb (84 kg) | Jun 15, 2021 |
| Addison Copeland; WR | Recruit ratings: Rivals: 247Sports: ESPN: (75) | | | | |
| Kyle Louis; S | East Orange, NJ | East Orange Campus High School | 6 ft 2 in (1.88 m) | 200 lb (91 kg) | Oct 25, 2021 |
| Kyle Louis; S | Recruit ratings: Rivals: 247Sports: ESPN: (74) | | | | |
| Sam Vander Haar; K | Melbourne, Australia | ProKick Australia | N/A | N/A | May 13, 2021 |
| Sam Vander Haar; K | Recruit ratings: Rivals: 247Sports: ESPN: (73) | | | | |
Overall recruit ranking: Rivals: 62 247Sports: 64
Note: In many cases, Scout, Rivals, 247Sports, On3, and ESPN may conflict in their listings of height and weight.; In these cases, the average was taken. ESPN grades are on a 100-point scale.; Sources: "Pittsburgh Football Commitment List". Rivals.; "2022 Player Commitments – Pittsburgh". ESPN.; "2022 Team Ranking". Rivals.com.; "2022 Pittsburgh Panthers football team". 247Sports.

=== Position key ===
| Back | B | Center | C | Cornerback | CB | Defensive back | DB | | |
| Defensive end | DE | Defensive lineman | DL | Defensive tackle | DT | End | E | | |
| Fullback | FB | Place Kicker | PK | Guard | G | Halfback | HB | Kicker | K |
| Kickoff returner | KR | Offensive tackle | OT | Offensive lineman | OL | Linebacker | LB | | |
| Long snapper | LS | Split end | SE | Punter | P | Punt returner | PR | Quarterback | QB |
| Running back | RB | Safety | S | Tight end | TE | Wide receiver | WR | | |

=== Transfers ===
==== Incoming ====
| Name | No. | Pos. | Height | Weight | Year | Hometown | Prev. school |
|---|---|---|---|---|---|---|---|
| Jerrod Means | #15 | WR | 6'2 | 215 | RS Sophomore | Lovejoy, GA | Louisiana Tech |
| Konata Mumpfield | #14 | WR | 6'0 | 174 | Freshman | Dacula, GA | Akron |
| Kedon Slovis | #9 | QB | 6'2 | 200 | Junior | Scottsdale, AZ | USC |
| Ryan Jacoby | #61 | OT | 6'5 | 270 | Sophomore | Mentor, OH | Ohio State |

== Schedule ==
| Date | Time | Opponent | Rank | Site | TV | Result | Attendance |
|---|---|---|---|---|---|---|---|
| September 1 | 7:00 p.m. | West Virginia* | No. 17 | Acrisure Stadium; Pittsburgh, PA (Backyard Brawl, College GameDay) | ESPN | W 38–31 | 70,622 |
| September 10 | 3:30 p.m. | No. 24 Tennessee* | No. 17 | Acrisure Stadium; Pittsburgh, PA | ABC | L 27–34 ^{OT} | 59,785 |
| September 17 | 7:30 p.m. | at Western Michigan* | No. 23 | Waldo Stadium; Kalamazoo, MI | ESPNU | W 34–13 | 22,875 |
| September 24 | 12:00 p.m. | No. 20 (FCS) Rhode Island* | No. 24 | Acrisure Stadium; Pittsburgh, PA | ACCN | W 45–24 | 54,667 |
| October 1 | 8:00 p.m. | Georgia Tech | No. 24 | Acrisure Stadium; Pittsburgh, PA | ACCN | L 21–26 | 46,972 |
| October 8 | 3:30 p.m. | Virginia Tech | | Acrisure Stadium; Pittsburgh, PA | ACCN | W 45–29 | 54,677 |
| October 22 | 8:00 p.m. | at Louisville | | Cardinal Stadium; Louisville, KY | ACCN | L 10–24 | 41,840 |
| October 29 | 8:00 p.m. | at No. 21 North Carolina | | Kenan Memorial Stadium; Chapel Hill, NC | ACCN | L 24–42 | 50,500 |
| November 5 | 3:30 p.m. | No. 20 Syracuse | | Acrisure Stadium; Pittsburgh, PA (rivalry) | ACCN | W 19–9 | 50,888 |
| November 12 | 12:00 p.m. | at Virginia | | Scott Stadium; Charlottesville, VA | ACCN | W 37–7 | 36,529 |
| November 19 | 12:00 p.m. | Duke | | Acrisure Stadium; Pittsburgh, PA | ACCN | W 28–26 | 45,362 |
| November 26 | 8:00 p.m. | at Miami (FL) | | Hard Rock Stadium; Miami, FL | ACCN | W 42–16 | 46,428 |
| December 30 | 2:00 p.m. | vs. No. 18 UCLA* | | Sun Bowl; El Paso, TX (Sun Bowl) | CBS | W 37–35 | 41,104 |
*Non-conference game; Rankings from AP Poll (and CFP Rankings, after November 1) - Released prior to game; All times are in Eastern time

== Game summaries ==
=== vs. West Virginia ===
West Virginia Mountaineers (0-0) vs No. 17 Pittsburgh Panthers (0-0) – Game summary

| Quarter | 1 | 2 | 3 | 4 | Total |
|---|---|---|---|---|---|
| Mountaineers | 0 | 10 | 7 | 14 | 31 |
| No. 17 Panthers | 3 | 7 | 14 | 14 | 38 |

at Acrisure Stadium • Pittsburgh, PA

- Date: September 1
- Game time: 7:00 P.M EST/ 4:00 p.m. PST
- Game weather: Sunny, 82 °F (28 °C)
- Game attendance: 70,622
- Referee: David Alvarez
- TV announcers (ESPN): Matt Barrie (play-by-play), Louis Riddick (analyst), and Harry Lyles, Jr. (sideline)

Game information

First Quarter

- (0:37) PITT – Ben Sauls 42 yard field goal (Drive: 11 plays, 73 yards, 6:48; PITT 3–0)

Second Quarter

- (12:45) WVU – Bryce Ford-Wheaton 10 yard pass from JT Daniels, Casey Legg kick (Drive: 6 plays, 75 yards, 2:52; WVU 7–3)
- (3:23) PITT – Rodney Hammond Jr. 4 yard run, Ben Sauls kick (Drive: 6 plays, 35 yards, 2:52; PITT 10–7)
- (0:00) WVU – Casey Legg 24 yard field goal (Drive: 13 plays, 74 yards, 3:17; Tied 10–10)

Third Quarter

- (13:08) WVU – C.J. Donaldson 5 yard run, Casey Legg kick (Drive: 1 play, 5 yards, 0:08; WVU 17–10)
- (5:54) PITT – Daniel Carter 1 yard run, Ben Sauls kick (Drive: 4 plays, 65 yards, 1:32; Tied 17–17)
- (3:42) PITT – Rodney Hammond Jr. 11 yard run, Ben Sauls kick (Drive: 3 plays, 62 yards, 1:26; PITT 24–17)

Fourth Quarter

- (14:52) WVU – Bryce Ford-Wheaton 16 yard pass from JT Daniels, Casey Legg kick (Drive: 9 plays, 75 yards, 3:50; Tied 24–24)
- (10:37) WVU – JT Daniels 1 yard run, Casey Legg kick (Drive: 6 play, 72 yards, 1:14; WVU 31–24)
- (3:41) PITT – Israel Abanikanda 24 yard pass from Kedon Slovis, Ben Sauls kick (Drive: 7 plays, 92 yards, 2:29; Tied 31–31)
- (2:58) PITT – M.J. Devonshire 56 interception return, Ben Sauls kick (Drive: 1 play, 56 yards, 0:13; PITT 38–31)

| Statistics | WVU | PITT |
|---|---|---|
| First downs | 22 | 20 |
| Total yards | 404 | 384 |
| Rushes/yards | 34–190 | 39–76 |
| Passing yards | 214 | 308 |
| Passing: Comp–Att–Int | 23–40–1 | 16–24–0 |
| Time of possession | 27:29 | 32:31 |

| Team | Category | Player | Statistics |
|---|---|---|---|
| West Virginia | Passing | JT Daniels | 23–40, 214 yards, 2 TD, 1 INT |
| West Virginia | Rushing | CJ Donaldson | 7 carries, 125 yards, 1 TD |
| West Virginia | Receiving | Bryce Ford-Wheaton | 9 receptions, 97 yards, 2 TD |
| Pittsburgh | Passing | Kedon Slovis | 16–24, 308 yards, 1 TD |
| Pittsburgh | Rushing | Rodney Hammond Jr. | 16 carries, 74 yards, 2 TD |
| Pittsburgh | Receiving | Jared Wayne | 3 receptions, 89 yards |

=== vs. No. 24 Tennessee ===
No. 24 Tennessee Volunteers (1-0) vs No. 17 Pittsburgh Panthers (1-0) – Game summary

| Quarter | 1 | 2 | 3 | 4 | OT | Total |
|---|---|---|---|---|---|---|
| No. 24 Volunteers | 7 | 17 | 0 | 3 | 7 | 34 |
| No. 17 Panthers | 10 | 7 | 0 | 10 | 0 | 27 |

at Acrisure Stadium • Pittsburgh, PA

- Date: September 10
- Game time: 3:30 P.M EST/ 12:30 p.m. PST
- Game weather: 75 °F (24 °C)
- Game attendance: 59,785
- Referee: Jason Autrey
- TV announcers (ABC): Sean McDonough (play-by-play), Todd Blackledge (analyst), and Molly McGrath (sideline)

Game information

First Quarter

- (10:27) PITT – Ben Sauls 30 yard field goal (Drive: 9 plays, 43 yards, 3:58; PITT 3–0)
- (9:00) PITT – Israel Abanikanda 76 yard rush, Ben Sauls kick (Drive: 1 play, 76 yards, 0:13; PITT 10–0)
- (1:02) TEN – Jabari Small 1 yard rush, Chase McGrath kick (Drive: 11 plays, 80 yards, 3:14; PITT 10–7)

Second Quarter

- (13:25) PITT – Gavin Bartholomew 57 yard pass from Kedon Slovis, Ben Sauls kick (Drive: 6 plays, 83 yards, 2:32; PITT 17–7)
- (10:04) TEN – Bru McCoy 32 yard pass from Hendon Hooker, Chase McGrath kick (Drive: 10 plays, 71 yards, 3:13; PITT 17–14)
- (4:56) TEN – Jabari Small 1 yard rush, Chase McGrath kick (Drive: 3 plays, 66 yards, 0:35; TEN 21–17)
- (0:00) TEN – Chase McGrath 37 yard field goal (Drive: 3 plays, 8 yards, 0:10; TEN 24–17)

Fourth Quarter

- (14:07) PITT – Ben Sauls 35 yard field goal (Drive: 12 plays, 27 yards, 5:13; TEN 24–20)
- (8:57) TEN – Chase McGrath 51 yard field goal (Drive: 15 plays, 41 yards, 5:10; TEN 27–20)
- (2:23) PITT – Jared Wayne 4 yard pass from Nick Patti, Ben Sauls kick (Drive: 10 plays, 35 yards, 5:05; Tie 27–27)

Overtime

- (0:00) TEN – Cedric Tillman 28 yard pass from Hendon Hooker, Chase McGrath kick (Drive: 2 plays, 25 yards, 0:00; TEN 34–27)

| Statistics | TEN | PITT |
|---|---|---|
| First downs | 20 | 21 |
| Total yards | 416 | 415 |
| Rushes/yards | 33–91 | 39–141 |
| Passing yards | 325 | 274 |
| Passing: Comp–Att–Int | 27–42–0 | 23–44–1 |
| Time of possession | 25:05 | 34:55 |

| Team | Category | Player | Statistics |
|---|---|---|---|
| Tennessee | Passing | Hendon Hooker | 27–42, 325 yards, 2 TD |
| Tennessee | Rushing | Jaylen Wright | 9 carries, 47 yards |
| Tennessee | Receiving | Cedric Tillman | 9 receptions, 162 yards, 1 TD |
| Pittsburgh | Passing | Kedon Slovis | 14–24, 195 yards, 1 TD, 1 INT |
| Pittsburgh | Rushing | Israel Abanikanda | 25 carries, 154 yards, 1 TD |
| Pittsburgh | Receiving | Gavin Bartholomew | 5 receptions, 84 yards, 1 TD |

=== at Western Michigan ===
No. 23 Pittsburgh Panthers (1-1) vs Western Michigan Broncos (1-1) – Game summary

| Quarter | 1 | 2 | 3 | 4 | Total |
|---|---|---|---|---|---|
| No. 23 Panthers | 10 | 3 | 7 | 14 | 34 |
| Broncos | 3 | 3 | 7 | 0 | 13 |

at Waldo Stadium • Kalamazoo, MI

- Date: September 17th
- Game time: 7:30 p.m. EST/4:30 p.m. PST
- Game weather: Temperature: 80 °F (27 °C) • Wind: SW at 10 miles per hour (16 km/h) • Weather: Sunny
- Game attendance: 22,875
- Referee: Jerry Magallanes
- TV announcers (ESPNU): Clay Matvick (play-by-play), Rocky Boiman (analyst), and Dawn Davenport (sideline)

=== vs. No. 20 (FCS) Rhode Island ===
No. 20 Rhode Island Rams (2-1) vs No. 24 Pittsburgh Panthers (2-1) – Game summary

| Quarter | 1 | 2 | 3 | 4 | Total |
|---|---|---|---|---|---|
| No 20 Rams | 7 | 7 | 3 | 7 | 24 |
| No. 24 Panthers | 14 | 10 | 7 | 14 | 45 |

at Acrisure Stadium • Pittsburgh, PA

- Date: Saturday 24th
- Game time: 12:00 p.m. EST/9:00 a.m. PST
- Game weather: Temperature: 64 °F (18 °C) • Wind: S at 5 miles per hour (8.0 km/h) • Weather: Sunny
- Game attendance: 54,667
- Referee: Stuart Mullins
- TV announcers (ACCN): Wes Durham (play-by-play), Roddy Jones (analyst), and Taylor Davis (sideline)

Game information

First quarter

- (12:18) PITT – M.J. Devonshire 82 Yd Punt Return, Ben Sauls Kick (Pittsburgh 7–0)
- (6:03) PITT – Israel Abanikanda 67 Yd Run, Ben Sauls Kick (Pittsburgh 14–0)
- (5:09) URI – Marques DeShields 63 Yd Run, Harrison Leonard Kick (Pittsburgh 14–7)

Second quarter

- (12:28) PITT – Israel Abanikanda 12 Yd Run, Ben Sauls Kick (Pittsburgh 21–7)
- (3:39) PITT – Ben Sauls 31 Yd Field Goal (Pittsburgh 24–7)
- (0:50) URI – Marques DeShields 1 Yd Run, Harrison Leonard Kick (Pittsburgh 24–14)

Third quarter

- (9:18) PITT – Israel Abanikanda 24 Yd Run, Ben Sauls Kick (Pittsburgh 31–14)
- (0:56) URI – Harrison Leonard 34 Yd Field Goal (Pittsburgh 31–17)

Fourth quarter

- (8:32) PITT – Israel Abanikanda 13 Yd Run, Ben Sauls Kick (Pittsburgh 38–17)
- (1:21) URI – Darius Savedge 15 Yd Pass, Harrison Leonard Kick (Pittsburgh 38–24)
- (1:11) PITT – Vincent Davis 18 Yd Run, Ben Sauls Kick (Pittsburgh 45–24)

| Statistics | URI | PITT |
|---|---|---|
| First downs | 16 | 25 |
| Plays–yards | 52 | 68–460 |
| Rushes–yards | 63 | 271 |
| Passing yards | 223 | 189 |
| Passing: comp–att–int | 17–30–0 | 20–27–0 |
| Time of possession | 24:51 | 35:09 |

| Team | Category | Player | Statistics |
|---|---|---|---|
| Rhode Island | Passing | Kasim Hill | 17/30, 223 yards, 1 TD |
| Rhode Island | Rushing | Marques DeShields | 10 carries, 82 yards, 2 TD |
| Rhode Island | Receiving | Kahtero Summers | 4 receptions, 55 yards |
| Pittsburgh | Passing | Kedon Slovis | 20/27, 189 yards |
| Pittsburgh | Rushing | Israel Abanikanda | 19 carries, 177 yards, 4 TD |
| Pittsburgh | Receiving | Konata Mumpfield | 5 receptions, 42 yards |

=== vs. Georgia Tech ===
Georgia Tech Yellow Jackets (1-3) vs No. 24 Pittsburgh Panthers (3-1) – Game summary

| Quarter | 1 | 2 | 3 | 4 | Total |
|---|---|---|---|---|---|
| Yellow Jackets | 3 | 3 | 3 | 17 | 26 |
| No. 24 Panthers | 0 | 7 | 0 | 14 | 21 |

at Acrisure Stadium • Pittsburgh, PA

- Date: October 1
- Game time: 8:00 p.m. EST/5:00 p.m. PST
- Game weather: Temperature: 55 °F (13 °C) • Wind: N at 9 miles per hour (14 km/h) • Weather: Rain
- Game attendance: 46,972
- Referee: Gary Patterson
- TV announcers (ACCN): Wes Durham (play-by-play), Roddy Jones (analyst), and Taylor Davis (sideline)

=== vs. Virginia Tech ===
Virginia Tech Hokies (2-3) vs Pittsburgh Panthers (3-2) – Game summary

| Quarter | 1 | 2 | 3 | 4 | Total |
|---|---|---|---|---|---|
| Hokies | 6 | 10 | 7 | 6 | 29 |
| Panthers | 7 | 10 | 14 | 14 | 45 |

at Acrisure Stadium • Pittsburgh, PA

- Date: October 8
- Game time: 3:30 p.m. EST/12:30 p.m. PST
- Game weather: Temperature:54 °F (12 °C) • Wind: W at 9 miles per hour (14 km/h) • Weather: Cloudy
- Game attendance: 54,677
- Referee: Riley Johnson
- TV announcers (ACCN): Wes Durham (play-by-play), Roddy Jones (analyst), and Taylor Davis (sideline)

Game information

First Quarter

- (3:53) PITT – Israel Abanikanda 38 yd Rush (Ben Sauls Kick) (Drive: 12 plays, 95 yards, 5:13; PITT 7–0)
- (2:50) VT - Malachi Thomas 5 yd Rush (Drive: 4 plays, 75 yards, 1:03; PITT 7-6)

Second Quarter

- (11:59) VT – William Ross 18 yd Field Goal (Drive: 13 plays, 67 yards, 5:18; VT 9–7)
- (10:45) VT - Keshawn King 19 yd Rush (William Ross Kick) (Drive: 2 plays, 25 yards, 0:30; VT 16-7)
- (7:14) PITT - Israel Abanikanda 17 yd Rush (Ben Sauls Kick) (Drive: 7 plays, 75 yards, 3:31; VT 16-14)
- (4:11) PITT - Ben Sauls 47 yd Field Goal (Drive: 5 plays, 27 yards, 1:55; PITT 17-16)

Third Quarter

- (9:54) PITT - Israel Abanikanda 29 yd Rush (Ben Sauls Kick) (Drive: 6 plays, 52 yards, 1:40; PITT 24-16)
- (6:48) PITT - Israel Abanikanda 5 yd Rush (Ben Sauls Kick) (Drive: 7 plays, 56 yards, 2:20; PITT 31-16)
- (0:30) VT - Da'Wain Lofton 43 yd Pass From Grant Wells (William Ross Kick) (Drive: 3 plays, 65 yards, 1:04; PITT 31-23)

Fourth Quarter

- (13:25) VT - Nyke Johnson 0 yd Punt Return (PITT 31-29)
- (10:40) PITT - Israel Abanikanda 10 yd Rush (Ben Sauls Kick) (Drive: 2 plays, 49 yards, 0:34; PITT 38-29)
- (7:56) PITT - Israel Abanikanda 80 yd Rush (Ben Sauls Kick) (Drive: 1 play, 80 yards, 0:12; PITT 45-29)

| Statistics | VT | PITT |
|---|---|---|
| First downs | 21 | 25 |
| Total yards | 403 | 496 |
| Rush yards | 126 | 326 |
| Passing yards | 277 | 170 |
| Turnovers | 1 | 1 |
| Time of possession | 27:29 | 32:31 |

| Team | Category | Player | Statistics |
|---|---|---|---|
| Virginia Tech | Passing | Grant Wells | 25/47, 277 yards, TD |
| Virginia Tech | Rushing | Malachi Thomas | 15 carries, 84 yards, TD |
| Virginia Tech | Receiving | Kaleb Smith | 9 receptions, 152 yards |
| Pittsburgh | Passing | Kedon Slovis | 15/28, 170 yards |
| Pittsburgh | Rushing | Israel Abanikanda | 36 carries, 320 yards, 6 TD |
| Pittsburgh | Receiving | Jaden Bradley | 5 receptions, 66 yards |

=== at Louisville ===
Pittsburgh Panthers (4-2) vs Louisville Cardinals (3-3) – Game summary

| Quarter | 1 | 2 | 3 | 4 | Total |
|---|---|---|---|---|---|
| Panthers | 7 | 0 | 3 | 0 | 10 |
| Cardinals | 0 | 7 | 0 | 17 | 24 |

at Cardinal Stadium • Louisville, KY

- Date: October 22
- Game time: 8:00 p.m. EST/5:00 p.m. PST
- Game weather: Temperature:71 °F (22 °C) • Wind: SE at 6 miles per hour (9.7 km/h) • Weather: Cloudy
- Game attendance: 41,840
- Referee: Adam Savoia
- TV announcers (ACCN): Wes Durham (play-by-play), Tim Hasselbeck (analyst), and Kelsey Riggs (sideline)

=== at No. 21 North Carolina ===
Pittsburgh Panthers (4-3) vs No. 21 North Carolina Tar Heels (6-1) – Game summary

| Quarter | 1 | 2 | 3 | 4 | Total |
|---|---|---|---|---|---|
| Panthers | 7 | 10 | 7 | 0 | 24 |
| No. 21 Tar Heels | 7 | 7 | 7 | 21 | 42 |

at Kenan Memorial Stadium • Chapel Hill, NC

- Date: October 29
- Game time: 8:00 p.m. EST/5:00 p.m. PST
- Game weather: Temperature: 60 °F (16 °C) • Wind: NE at 4 miles per hour (6.4 km/h) • Weather: Cloudy
- Game attendance: 50,500
- Referee: Jeff Heaser
- TV announcers (ACCN): Wes Durham (play-by-play), Tim Hasselbeck (analyst), and Kelsey Riggs (sideline)

Game information

First quarter

- (11:30) PIT – Israel Abanikanda 6-yard run, Ben Sauls kick (Drive: 8 plays, 77 yards, 3:25; Pittsburgh 7–0)
- (4:46) UNC – Antoine Green 16-yard pass from Drake Maye, Noah Burnette kick (Drive: 10 plays, 59 yards, 4:07; Tied 7–7)

Second quarter

- (13:20) PIT – Israel Abanikanda 4-yard run, Ben Sauls kick (Drive: 3 plays, 45 yards, 1:27; Pittsburgh 14–7)
- (5:14) PIT – Ben Sauls 47-yard field goal (Drive: 10 plays, 63 yards, 5:32; Pittsburgh 17–7)
- (3:33) UNC – Kobe Paysour 1-yard pass from Drake Maye, Noah Burnette kick (Drive: 5 plays, 75 yards, 1:41; Pittsburgh 17–14)

Third quarter

- (10:07) PIT – Israel Abanikanda 22-yard run, Ben Sauls kick (Drive: 5 plays, 83 yards, 2:44; Pittsburgh 24–14)
- (6:05) UNC – Josh Downs 13-yard pass from Drake Maye, Noah Burnette kick (Drive: 12 plays, 75 yards, 4:02; Pittsburgh 24–21)

Fourth quarter

- (14:07) UNC – Elijah Green 2-yard run, Noah Burnette kick (Drive: 10 plays, 84 yards, 3:57; North Carolina 28–24)
- (10:46) UNC – Josh Downs 25-yard pass from Drake Maye, Noah Burnette kick (Drive: 3 plays, 49 yards, 0:42; North Carolina 35–24)
- (9:07) UNC – Antoine Green 13-yard pass from Drake Maye, Noah Burnette kick (Drive: 3 plays, 35 yards, 1:13; North Carolina 42–24)

| Statistics | Pitt | UNC |
|---|---|---|
| First downs | 14 | 26 |
| Plays–yards | 61–367 | 75–474 |
| Rushes–yards | 30–131 | 30–86 |
| Passing yards | 236 | 388 |
| Passing: comp–att–int | 14–31–0 | 34–45–0 |
| Time of possession | 28:32 | 31:28 |

| Team | Category | Player | Statistics |
|---|---|---|---|
| Pittsburgh | Passing | Kedon Slovis | 14/31, 236 yards |
| Pittsburgh | Rushing | Israel Abanikanda | 26 carries, 127 yards, 3 TD |
| Pittsburgh | Receiving | Jared Wayne | 7 receptions, 161 yards |
| North Carolina | Passing | Drake Maye | 34/44, 388 yards, 5 TD |
| North Carolina | Rushing | Drake Maye | 14 carries, 61 yards |
| North Carolina | Receiving | Antoine Green | 10 receptions, 180 yards, 2 TD |

=== vs. No. 20 Syracuse ===
No. 22 Syracuse Orange (6-2) vs Pittsburgh Panthers (4-4) – Game summary

| Quarter | 1 | 2 | 3 | 4 | Total |
|---|---|---|---|---|---|
| No. 20 Orange | 3 | 3 | 0 | 3 | 9 |
| Panthers | 0 | 10 | 7 | 2 | 19 |

at Acrisure Stadium • Pittsburgh, PA

- Date: November 5
- Game time: 3:30 p.m. EST/12:30 p.m. PST
- Game weather: Temperature:79 °F (26 °C) • Wind: S at 14 miles per hour (23 km/h) • Weather: Cloudy
- Game attendance: 50,888
- Referee: Riley Johnson
- TV announcers (ACCN): Chris Cotter (play-by-play), Mark Herzlich (analyst), and Lericia Harris (sideline)

=== at Virginia ===
Pittsburgh Panthers (5-4) vs Virginia Cavaliers (3-6) – Game summary

| Quarter | 1 | 2 | 3 | 4 | Total |
|---|---|---|---|---|---|
| Panthers | 28 | 0 | 3 | 6 | 37 |
| Cavaliers | 0 | 0 | 7 | 0 | 7 |

at Scott Stadium • Charlottesville, VA

- Date: November 12
- Game time: 12:00 p.m. EST/9:00 a.m. PST
- Game weather: Sunny
- Game attendance: 36,529
- Referee: Mullins Stuart
- TV announcers (ACCN): Chris Cotter (play-by-play), Charles Arbuckle (analyst), and Lericia Harris (sideline)

=== vs. Duke ===
Duke Blue Devils (7-3) vs Pittsburgh Panthers (6-4) – Game summary

| Quarter | 1 | 2 | 3 | 4 | Total |
|---|---|---|---|---|---|
| Panthers | 10 | 10 | 0 | 8 | 28 |
| Blue Devils | 7 | 7 | 0 | 12 | 26 |

at Acrisure Stadium • Pittsburgh, PA

- Date: November 19
- Game time: 12:00 p.m. EST/9:00 a.m. PST
- Game weather: Temperature:29 °F (−2 °C) • Wind: SW at 14 miles per hour (23 km/h) • Weather: Cloudy
- Game attendance: 45,362
- Referee: Mike Roche
- TV announcers (ACCN): Chris Cotter (play-by-play), Mark Herzlich (analyst), and Lericia Harris (sideline)

=== at Miami (FL) ===
Pittsburgh Panthers (7-4) vs Miami (FL) Hurricanes (5-6) – Game summary

| Quarter | 1 | 2 | 3 | 4 | Total |
|---|---|---|---|---|---|
| Panthers | 14 | 14 | 7 | 7 | 42 |
| Hurricanes | 0 | 0 | 3 | 13 | 16 |

at Hard Rock Stadium • Miami, FL

- Date: November 26
- Game time: 8:00 p.m. EST/5:00 p.m. PST
- Game weather: Clear • Temperature: 78 °F (26 °C) • Wind: SE at 7 miles per hour (11 km/h)
- Game attendance: 46,428
- Referee: Gary Patterson
- TV announcers (ACCN): Dave O'Brien (play-by-play), Tim Hasselbeck (analyst), and Kelsey Riggs (sideline)

Game information

First quarter

- (10:13) PIT – Israel Abanikanda 2-yard run, Ben Sauls kick (Drive: 4 plays, 30 yards, 2:06; Pittsburgh 7–0)
- (0:50) PIT – Jared Wayne 66-yard pass from Kedon Slovis, Ben Sauls kick (Drive: 2 plays, 78 yards, 0:48; Pittsburgh 14–0)

Second quarter

- (11:46) PIT – Israel Abanikanda 11-yard run, Ben Sauls kick (Drive: 2 plays, 19 yards, 0:45; Pittsburgh 21–0)
- (0:31) PIT – Jared Wayne 26-yard pass from Kedon Slovis, Ben Sauls kick (Drive: 7 plays, 89 yards, 3:27; Pittsburgh 28–0)

Third quarter

- (6:22) MIA – Andres Borregales 25-yard field goal (Drive: 10 plays, 78 yards, 4:57; Pittsburgh 28–3)
- (0:36) PIT – Jared Wayne 7-yard pass from Kedon Slovis, Ben Sauls kick (Drive: 10 plays, 73 yards, 5:39; Pittsburgh 35–3)

Fourth quarter

- (11:52) MIA – Will Mallory 4-yard pass from Jake Garcia (Drive: 7 plays, 63 yards, 3:37; Pittsburgh 35–9)
- (9:16) PIT – C'Bo Flemister 26-yard run, Ben Sauls kick (Drive: 6 plays, 71 yards, 2:36; Pittsburgh 42–9)
- (7:22) MIA – Xavier Restrepo 4-yard pass from Jake Garcia, Andres Borregales kick (Drive: 4 plays, 75 yards, 1:54; Pittsburgh 42–16)

| Statistics | PITT | MIA |
|---|---|---|
| First downs | 27 | 20 |
| Plays–yards | 63–510 | 66–385 |
| Rushes–yards | 35–248 | 27–106 |
| Passing yards | 262 | 279 |
| Passing: Comp–Att–Int | 18–28–1 | 23–39–2 |
| Time of possession | 32:18 | 27:42 |

| Team | Category | Player | Statistics |
|---|---|---|---|
| Pittsburgh | Passing | Kedon Slovis | 18/28, 262 yards, 3 TD, INT |
| Pittsburgh | Rushing | Israel Abanikanda | 15 carries, 111 yards, 2 TD |
| Pittsburgh | Receiving | Jared Wayne | 11 receptions, 205 yards, 3 TD |
| Miami (FL) | Passing | Jake Garcia | 17/28, 192 yards, 2 TD |
| Miami (FL) | Rushing | Jaylan Knighton | 7 carries, 72 yards |
| Miami (FL) | Receiving | Will Mallory | 9 receptions, 103 yards, TD |

=== vs UCLA (2022 Sun Bowl) ===
Pittsburgh Panthers (8-4) vs No. 18 UCLA Bruins (9-3) – Game summary

| Quarter | 1 | 2 | 3 | 4 | Total |
|---|---|---|---|---|---|
| Pittsburgh Panthers | 6 | 8 | 7 | 16 | 37 |
| No.18 UCLA Bruins | 7 | 14 | 7 | 7 | 35 |

at Sun Bowl • El Paso, TX

- Date: December 30
- Game time: 2:00 p.m. EST/11:00 a.m. PST
- Game weather: Partly cloudy, 55 °F (13 °C)
- Game attendance: 41,104
- Referee: Derek Anderson
- TV announcers (CBS/Bowl Season Radio): Brad Nessler (play-by-play), Gary Danielson (analyst), and Jenny Dell (sideline)/Brian Roth (play-by-play), Justin Fuente (analyst), and Rachel Phillips (sideline)

Game information

First quarter

- (8:05) PITT – Ben Sauls 22-yard field goal (Drive: 13 plays, 71 yards, 6:55; Pittsburgh 3–0)
- (5:15) UCLA – Logan Loya 11-yard pass from Dorian Thompson-Robinson, Nicholas Barr-Mira kick (Drive: 7 plays, 74 yards, 2:50; UCLA 7–3)
- (0:00) PITT – Ben Sauls 49-yard field goal (Drive: 11 plays, 47 yards, 5:14; UCLA 7–6)

Second quarter

- (11:57) UCLA – Dorian Thompson-Robinson 1-yard run, Nicholas Barr-Mira kick (Drive: 8 plays, 75 yards, 3:03; UCLA 14–6)
- (3:49) PITT – Bub Means 15-yard pass from Nick Patti, Nick Patti two-point pass to Konata Mumpfield (Drive: 9 plays, 94 yards, 4:21; Tied 14–14)
- (0:57) UCLA – Titus Mokiao-Atimalala 28-yard pass from Dorian Thompson-Robinson, Nicholas Barr-Mira kick (Drive: 8 plays, 75 yards, 2:52; UCLA 21–14)

Third quarter

- (8:45) UCLA – Jaylin Davies 52-yard interception return, Nicholas Barr-Mira kick (Drive: 2 plays, 6 yards, 0:55; UCLA 28–14)
- (3:04) PITT – Rodney Hammond Jr. 1-yard run, Ben Sauls kick (Drive: 11 plays, 75 yards, 5:41; UCLA 28–21)

Fourth quarter

- (12:44) PITT – Rodney Hammond Jr. 7-yard run, Ben Sauls kick (Drive: 5 plays, 18 yards, 1:57; Tied 28–28)
- (10:38) PITT – Ben Sauls 31-yard field goal (Drive: 6 plays, 7 yards, 2:06; Pittsburgh 31–28)
- (4:24) PITT – Ben Sauls 27-yard field goal (Drive: 11 plays, 41 yards, 4:24; Pittsburgh 34–28)
- (0:34) UCLA – T. J. Harden 8-yard run, Nicholas Barr-Mira kick (Drive: 8 plays, 70 yards, 1:27; UCLA 35–34)
- (0:04) PITT – Ben Sauls 47-yard field goal (Drive: 6 plays, 46 yards, 0:30; Pittsburgh 37–35)

| Statistics | PITT | UCLA |
|---|---|---|
| First downs | 27 | 19 |
| Total yards | 443 | 451 |
| Rushes/yards | 46–203 | 27–141 |
| Passing yards | 240 | 310 |
| Passing: Comp–Att–Int | 21–43–1 | 22–33–4 |
| Time of possession | 37:03 | 22:57 |

| Team | Category | Player | Statistics |
|---|---|---|---|
| Pittsburgh | Passing | Nick Patti | 20/41, 224 yards, TD, INT |
| Pittsburgh | Rushing | Rodney Hammond Jr. | 25 carries, 93 yards, 2 TD |
| Pittsburgh | Receiving | Bub Means | 4 receptions, 84 yards, TD |
| UCLA | Passing | Dorian Thompson-Robinson | 16/24, 271 yards, 2 TD, 3 INT |
| UCLA | Rushing | T. J. Harden | 11 carries, 111 yards, TD |
| UCLA | Receiving | Kam Brown | 4 receptions, 115 yards |

== Rankings ==
Ranking movements Legend: ██ Increase in ranking ██ Decrease in ranking — = Not ranked RV = Received votes
| | Week | | | | | | | | | | | | | | | |
| Poll | Pre | 1 | 2 | 3 | 4 | 5 | 6 | 7 | 8 | 9 | 10 | 11 | 12 | 13 | 14 | Final |
|---|---|---|---|---|---|---|---|---|---|---|---|---|---|---|---|---|
| AP | 17 | 17 | 23 | 24 | 24 | — | — | — | — | — | — | — | — | — | RV | 22 |
| Coaches | 16 | 14 | 25 | RV | 24 | RV | RV | RV | RV | — | — | RV | RV | RV | RV | 22 |
| CFP | Not released | | | | | | | | | — | — | — | — | — | — | Not released |

== Coaching staff ==
2022 Pittsburgh Panthers football staff

Coaching staff
- Pat Narduzzi – Head coach
- Charlie Partridge – Assistant head coach/defensive line
- Frank Cignetti Jr. – Offensive coordinator/quarterbacks
- Randy Bates – Defensive coordinator
- Andre Powell – Running backs/special teams
- Dave Borbely – Offensive line
- Archie Collins – Secondary
- Ryan Manalac – Linebackers
- Tiquan Underwood – Wide receivers/passing game coordinator
- Tim Salem – Tight ends
- Cory Sanders – Safeties

== Players drafted into the NFL ==
| Round | Pick | Player | Position | NFL club |
|---|---|---|---|---|
| 1 | 19 | Calijah Kancey | DT | Tampa Bay Buccaneers |
| 4 | 120 | Carter Warren | OT | New York Jets |
| 5 | 143 | Israel Abanikanda | RB | New York Jets |
| 5 | 153 | SirVocea Dennis | LB | Tampa Bay Buccaneers |
| 6 | 208 | Erick Hallett | S | Jacksonville Jaguars |
| 7 | 248 | Brandon Hill | S | Houston Texans |
