= 2022 Sun Bowl =

American college football game

2022 Tony the Tiger Sun Bowl
- 89th Sun Bowl
Pittsburgh Panthers	UCLA Bruins
(8–4)	(9–3)
ACC	Pac-12
37	35
Head coach: Pat Narduzzi	Head coach: Chip Kelly
	AP / Coaches / CFP; 18 / 18 / 18
	1	2	3	4	Total
Pittsburgh	6	8	7	16	37
UCLA	7	14	7	7	35
- Date: December 30, 2022
- Season: 2022
- Stadium: Sun Bowl
- Location: El Paso, Texas
- MVP: Rodney Hammond Jr. (RB, Pittsburgh)
- Favorite: UCLA by 8.5
- Referee: Derek Anderson (Big 12)
- Attendance: 41,104
- Payout: US$4,550,000

United States TV coverage
- Network: CBS
- Announcers: Brad Nessler (play-by-play), Gary Danielson (analyst) and Jenny Dell (sideline)

The 2022 Sun Bowl was a college football bowl game played on December 30, 2022, at the Sun Bowl in El Paso, Texas. The 89th edition (88th playing) of the Sun Bowl, the game featured Pittsburgh from the Atlantic Coast Conference (ACC) and UCLA from the Pac-12 Conference. The game began at 12:13 p.m. MST and was aired on CBS. It was one of the 2022–23 bowl games concluding the 2022 FBS football season. Sponsored by Kellogg's Frosted Flakes breakfast cereal, the game was officially known as the Tony the Tiger Sun Bowl, after its mascot, Tony the Tiger.

== Teams ==
The bowl has tie-ins with the Atlantic Coast Conference (ACC) and the Pac-12 Conference, who supplied Pittsburgh and UCLA, respectively, for the game. This will be the 15th meeting between the programs; the Bruins lead the all-time series, 9–5.

=== Pitt ===
Pittsburgh played to a 8–4 regular-season record, 5–3 in conference play. They were ranked as high as No. 17. in September, but fell out of the rankings after losing two of their first five games. The Panthers finished their regular season with four consecutive wins. They faced three ranked FBS teams during the season, defeating Syracuse while losing to Tennessee and North Carolina.

Several days before the game, three Pittsburgh players had their flight from Dallas to El Paso canceled on Christmas Day, but were able to make the 600-mile (970 km) trip via a carpool with Joe Golding, head basketball coach of the UTEP Miners men's basketball team, who was making the same Dallas-to-El Paso journey with his family.

=== UCLA ===
UCLA compiled a 9–3 regular-season record, 6–3 in conference play. They opened the season with six consecutive wins, but then lost three of their next five games. They faced four ranked opponents during the season, defeating Washington and Utah while losing to Oregon and USC. Ranked as high as No. 9 during the season, the Bruins enter the bowl ranked No. 18 in major polls. Appearing in their fifth Sun Bowl, UCLA is 3–1 in prior editions of the bowl.

== Game summary ==
2022 Tony the Tiger Sun Bowl

Quarter	1	2	3	4	Total
Pittsburgh	6	8	7	16	37
No. 18 UCLA	7	14	7	7	35

at Sun Bowl • El Paso, Texas

- Date: Friday, December 30, 2022
- Game time: 12:00 p.m. MST
- Game weather: Sunny
- Game attendance: 41,104
- Referee: Derek Anderson
- TV announcers (CBS): Brad Nessler (play-by-play), Gary Danielson (analyst), and Jenny Dell (sideline)
- Box score

Scoring summary

Quarter	Time	Drive			Team	Scoring information	Score	
Quarter	Time	Plays	Yards	TOP	Team	Scoring information	Pittsburgh	UCLA
1	8:05	13	71	6:55	Pittsburgh	22-yard field goal by Ben Sauls	3	0
1	5:15	7	74	2:50	UCLA	Logan Loya 11-yard touchdown reception from Dorian Thompson-Robinson, Nicholas Barr-Mira kick good	3	7
1	0:00	11	71	5:15	Pittsburgh	48-yard field goal by Ben Sauls	6	7
2	11:57	8	75	3:03	UCLA	Dorian Thompson-Robinson 1-yard touchdown run, Nicholas Barr-Mira kick good	6	14
2	3:49	9	94	4:21	Pittsburgh	Bub Means 15-yard touchdown reception from Nick Patti, 2-point pass to Konata Mumpfield good	14	14
2	0:57	8	75	2:52	UCLA	Titus Mokiao-Atimalala 28-yard touchdown reception from Dorian Thompson-Robinson, Nicholas Barr-Mira kick good	14	21
3	8:45	2	6	0:55	UCLA	Interception returned 52 yards for touchdown by Jaylin Davies, Nicholas Barr-Mira kick good	14	28
3	3:04	11	75	5:41	Pittsburgh	Rodney Hammond Jr. 1-yard touchdown run, Ben Sauls kick good	21	28
4	12:44	5	18	1:57	Pittsburgh	Rodney Hammond Jr. 7-yard touchdown run, Ben Sauls kick good	28	28
4	10:38	6	7	2:06	Pittsburgh	31-yard field goal by Ben Sauls	31	28
4	4:24	11	41	4:24	Pittsburgh	27-yard field goal by Ben Sauls	34	28
4	0:34	8	70	1:27	UCLA	T. J. Harden 8-yard touchdown run, Nicholas Barr-Mira kick good	34	35
4	0:04	6	46	0:30	Pittsburgh	47-yard field goal by Ben Sauls	37	35
"TOP" = time of possession. For other American football terms, see Glossary of American football.							37	35

== Statistics ==
Team statistical comparison
Statistic	Pittsburgh	UCLA
First downs	27	19
First downs rushing	12	7
First downs passing	14	12
First downs penalty	1	0
Third down efficiency	6–18	5–10
Fourth down efficiency	3–4	0–1
Total plays–net yards	89–447	59–442
Rushing attempts–net yards	46–199	27–141
Yards per rush	4.3	5.2
Yards passing	248	301
Pass completions–attempts	21–43	21–32
Interceptions thrown	1	4
Punt returns–total yards	1–6	0–0
Kickoff returns–total yards	1–17	1–23
Punts–average yardage	4–54.8	3–36.3
Fumbles–lost	2–0	1–0
Penalties–yards	6–36	4–42
Time of possession	37:07	22:53

Pittsburgh statistics
Panthers passing
	C–A	Yds	TD–INT
Nick Patti	20–41	224	1–1
Nate Yarnell	1–2	16	0–0
Panthers rushing
	Car	Yds	TD
Rodney Hammond Jr.	25	93	2
Nick Patti	10	72	0
Vincent Davis	7	27	0
Daniel Carter	4	11	0
Panthers receiving
	Rec	Yds	TD
Bub Means	4	84	1
Konata Mumpfield	7	78	0
Jared Wayne	5	50	0
Vincent Davis	1	11	0
Rodney Hammond Jr.	1	8	0
Karter Johnson	1	7	0
Daniel Carter	1	3	0
Gavin Bartholomew	1	-1	0

UCLA statistics
Bruins passing
	C–A	Yds	TD–INT
Dorian Thompson-Robinson	16–24	271	2–3
Ethan Garbers	6–9	39	0–1
Bruins rushing
	Car	Yds	TD
TJ Harden	11	111	1
Keegan Jones	20	0	
Dorian Thompson-Robinson	5	15	1
Colson Yankoff	1	-1	0
Ethan Garbers	3	-4	0
Bruins receiving
	Rec	Yds	TD
Kam Brown	4	115	0
Titus Mokiao-Atimalala	3	89	1
Keegan Jones	6	53	0
Jake Bobo	3	28	0
Logan Loya	3	26	1
Michael Ezeike	1	5	0
TJ Harden	2	-6	0
