= Laiatu Latu =

American football player (born 2000)

No. 97 – Indianapolis Colts
- Position: Defensive end
- Roster status: Active

Personal information
- Born: December 31, 2000 (age 25); Sacramento, California, U.S.
- Listed height: 6 ft 5 in (1.96 m)
- Listed weight: 265 lb (120 kg)

Career information
- High school: Jesuit (Sacramento)
- College: Washington (2019–2021); UCLA (2022–2023)
- NFL draft: 2024: 1st round, 15th overall pick

Career history
- Indianapolis Colts (2024–present)

Awards and highlights
- PFWA All-Rookie Team (2024); Ted Hendricks Award (2023); Lombardi Award (2023); Unanimous All-American (2023); Pac-12 Defensive Player of the Year (2023); Morris Trophy (2023); Polynesian College Football Player of the Year (2023); 2× First-team All-Pac-12 (2022, 2023)

Career NFL statistics as of Week 7, 2026
- Total tackles: 93
- Sacks: 13.5
- Forced fumbles: 4
- Fumble recoveries: 1
- Pass deflections: 8
- Interceptions: 3
- Stats at Pro Football Reference

Laiatu Latu (ly-AH-too LAH-too; born December 31, 2000) is an American professional football defensive end for the Indianapolis Colts of the National Football League (NFL). He played college football for the Washington Huskies and UCLA Bruins, where he was named a unanimous All-American and won the Ted Hendricks and Lombardi Awards with the latter in 2023. Latu was selected by the Colts in the first round of the 2024 NFL draft.

== Early life ==
Latu was born on December 31, 2000, in Sacramento, California, later attending Jesuit High School. As a junior he earned accolades playing both ways — as a tight end on offense and an outside linebacker on defense, also making significant contributions as a member of Jesuit's special teams. Marauders head coach Marion Blanton characterized Latu as a "solid young man" who was "very coachable." "His motor is always going," Blanton noted.

Latu was named first team All-California after recording 94 total tackles, 29.5 tackles for loss, and six sacks as a senior. Standing 6'5" and weighing 245 pounds as a senior, Latu was rated a four-star recruit and committed to play college football at Washington over offers from UCLA, USC, Oregon, Stanford, and Alabama.

== College career ==
Latu began his college career with the Washington Huskies in the fall of 2019. He played in 12 games as a freshman and finished the season with 16 tackles and 1.5 tackles for loss. Latu suffered a neck injury during fall practices entering his 2020 sophomore year. He did not appear in any of Washington's four games played during the COVID pandemic-shortened season. He underwent surgery on his neck in March 2021 in an attempt to alleviate his nerve issue.

Washington's team doctors deemed that Latu's injury had not recovered sufficiently for him to continue playing football. Huskies head coach Jimmy Lake announced that Latu had been forced by injury to retire for medical reasons at the start of spring practices in 2021.

"We consulted I believe about five of the best specialists in the country," Lake told the press. "We exhausted every professional we could think of to make sure this was the proper decision.... It was a tough decision to make for sure, but it's for the safety of our players first and foremost. We never want to put anybody in danger of possibly not being able to use his extremities the rest of his life."

Latu was thus forced out of football for 2021. Latu sought to continue his career as a player, however, and spent the next four months attempting to gain medical clearance to play elsewhere and searching for a college program that would take a chance on him given his previous injury.

With the assistance of his position coach at Washington, Ikaika Malloe, Latu sought multiple additional medical opinions from around the country, including one from Dr. Robert Watkins of Marina del Rey, California. In September 2021, Latu traveled to California to be examined by Watkins, who subsequently gave him medical clearance to play football again.

Malloe was subsequently hired by UCLA and was surprised to learn that his new team already referred players to Dr. Watkins as necessary, thus providing bona fides for the medical clearance and opening the door for him to become a member of the Bruins. Latu entered the NCAA transfer portal and transferred to UCLA in time to begin non-contact work in preparation for the 2022 season. He was cleared to play by team physicians near the end on the Bruins' spring practices.

During his 2022 junior season Latu was named the Pac-12 Conference Defensive Player of the Week for week 4 after recording three sacks and forcing a fumble against Colorado. He ended with 10.5 sacks for the year in 13 games played. In December 2022 Latu was named one of three comeback players of the year in college football, along with University of Washington quarterback Michael Penix and University of Minnesota running back Mohamed Ibrahim.

In 2023 Latu started all 12 games for UCLA. He led the nation in tackles for loss per game (1.8) and ranked fourth nationally in sacks per game, with a 1.08 average. His total of 13.0 sacks was the highest by any player in the Pac-12. He also intercepted two passes as a senior and forced a total of five fumbles over the two years of his career as a Bruin. Latu was UCLA's first-ever winner of both the Lombardi Award and the Ted Hendricks Award, presented to the top defensive end in the country. Latu was the Pac-12 Conference Defensive Player of the year in 2023 and a unanimous selection as an All-American for that season.

== Professional career ==
Pre-draft measurables
Height	Weight	Arm length	Hand span	Wingspan	40-yard dash	10-yard split	20-yard split	20-yard shuttle	Three-cone drill	Vertical jump	Broad jump
6 ft 4 3/4 in (1.95 m)	259 lb (117 kg)	32 5/8 in (0.83 m)	9 5/8 in (0.24 m)	6 ft 6 1/4 in (1.99 m)	4.64 s	1.62 s	2.70 s	4.34 s	7.09 s	32.0 in (0.81 m)	9 ft 8 in (2.95 m)
All values from NFL Combine/Pro Day

=== 2024 season ===
Latu was selected by the Indianapolis Colts with the 15th overall pick in the first round of the 2024 NFL draft. He was the first defensive player selected in the draft.

According to Colts area scout Chris McGaha, the team's decision to select Latu revolved both around his complete love of the game, exemplified by his battle to return from injury, and his physical gifts.

"It kind of jumps off the tape, the ones who have the standout traits," McGaha told the Indianapolis Star. "He's athletic. You see the get-off right away. He can bend. He's got a long list of pass rush moves that he puts in play all the time. He can win upfield, he can win inside, he can come down the middle with power. He's great with his hands. He's got moves and he's got countermoves. You feel the twitch, the power. The way he can get off the ball, the way he can contort his body. The physical traits, to me, are the easiest part to see to his game.”

As a rookie, Latu appeared in 17 games and started one. He had four sacks, 32 tackles, one pass defended, and three forced fumbles. He was named to the PFWA All-Rookie Team.

=== 2025 season ===
In Week 1 against the Miami Dolphins, Latu recorded his first career interception against Tua Tagovailoa.

== NFL career statistics ==
Legend
**Bold**	Career high

=== Regular season ===
Year	Team	Games		Tackles					Interceptions						Fumbles			
Year	Team	GP	GS	Comb	Solo	Ast	Sck	TFL	PD	Int	Yds	Avg	Lng	TD	FF	FR	Yds	TD
2024	IND	17	1	32	16	16	4.0	5	1	0	0	0.0	0	0	**3**	**1**	0	0
2025	IND	16	16	**45**	**27**	**18**	**8.5**	**12**	**5**	**3**	**9**	**3.0**	**6**	0	1	0	0	0
2026	IND	7	7	16	9	7	1.0	0	2	0	0	0.0	0	0	0	0	0	0
Career		40	24	93	52	41	13.5	17	8	3	9	3.0	6	0	4	1	0	0

== Personal life ==
Latu's younger brother, Keleki, is a tight end for the Buffalo Bills.
