= Jacob Sykes =

American football player (born 1999)

Profile
- Position: Defensive end

Personal information
- Born: August 9, 1999 (age 27); Kansas City, Missouri, U.S.
- Listed height: 6 ft 3 in (1.91 m)
- Listed weight: 282 lb (128 kg)

Career information
- High school: Rockhurst (Kansas City)
- College: Harvard (2018–2021); UCLA (2022)
- NFL draft: 2023: undrafted

Career history
- Seattle Seahawks (2023)*; San Antonio Brahmas (2024–2025); Philadelphia Eagles (2025)*; Orlando Storm (2026)*
- * Offseason or practice squad member only

Jacob Sykes (born August 9, 1999) is an American professional football defensive end. He played college football for the Harvard Crimson and UCLA Bruins, and was signed by the Seattle Seahawks as an undrafted free agent in 2023.

== Early life ==
Sykes was born on August 9, 1999. The son of two engineers, he grew up in Kansas City, Missouri, and was known for his "off-the-charts intellect," according to the Los Angeles Times. He attended Academie Lafayette French immersion school (K-8) and is fluent in French. He took college courses while in sixth grade and in seventh grade assisted in teaching courses at Langston University. He also competed in state math and history competitions when young, earning a placement in the former while winning the latter. As a freshman in high school, Sykes scored a 34 on the ACT test, and he graduated with a GPA of 4.23.

Sykes was also a talented athlete from a young age, lettering in four sports at Rockhurst High School while being the first freshman to start a football game there. He was twice a team captain in track and field and was the captain of the football team as a senior. A National Honor Society (NHS) member, Sykes was a first-team all-state football player and was named their most valuable player for the 2017–18 school year. He was also named The Kansas City Star's Boys Scholar-Athlete of the Year. 247Sports ranked him as a three-star recruit to play college football and placed him as the 14th-best player in the state.

== College career ==
Sykes committed to play college football for the Harvard Crimson and appeared in eight games as a true freshman. During his sophomore season, he totaled 36 tackles, 2.5 sacks and a blocked field goal while appearing in all 10 games. After the Ivy League canceled the 2020 season due to the COVID-19 pandemic, Sykes returned in 2021 and became a first-team all-conference selection with 29 tackles and a team-leading seven sacks. He entered the NCAA transfer portal in 2022, after having graduated from Harvard with a degree in applied mathematics. Sykes ultimately transferred to play with the UCLA Bruins, and appeared in 13 games, six as a starter, in the 2022 season, earning third-team All-Pac-12 honors from Pro Football Focus (PFF) after posting 29 tackles and a sack.

== Professional career ==
Pre-draft measurables
Height	Weight	Arm length	Hand span	40-yard dash	10-yard split	20-yard split	20-yard shuttle	Three-cone drill	Vertical jump	Broad jump	Bench press
6 ft 2 3/4 in (1.90 m)	282 lb (128 kg)	32 3/4 in (0.83 m)	10 1/8 in (0.26 m)	4.94 s	1.72 s	2.86 s	4.48 s	7.45 s	32.0 in (0.81 m)	9 ft 2 in (2.79 m)	27 reps
All values from Pro Day

=== Seattle Seahawks ===
After going unselected in the 2023 NFL draft, Sykes was signed by the Seattle Seahawks as an undrafted free agent. He was waived on August 29, 2023, as part of final roster cuts.

=== San Antonio Brahmas ===
On February 6, 2024, Sykes signed with the San Antonio Brahmas of the United Football League (UFL). He re-signed with the team on August 26.

=== Philadelphia Eagles ===
On July 22, 2025, Sykes signed with the Philadelphia Eagles. He was waived on August 26 as part of final roster cuts, re-signed to the practice squad on September 10 and released from the Eagles the following day. On October 2, Sykes was re-signed to the practice squad, but was released the next day.

=== Orlando Storm ===
On January 13, 2026, Sykes was selected by the Orlando Storm in the 2026 UFL Draft. He was released on March 19.
