= Jake Bobo =

American football player (born 1998)

No. 19 – Seattle Seahawks
- Position: Wide receiver
- Roster status: Injured reserve

Personal information
- Born: August 4, 1998 (age 28); North Andover, Massachusetts, U.S.
- Listed height: 6 ft 4 in (1.93 m)
- Listed weight: 211 lb (96 kg)

Career information
- High school: Belmont Hill School (Belmont, Massachusetts)
- College: Duke (2018–2021); UCLA (2022)
- NFL draft: 2023: undrafted

Career history
- Seattle Seahawks (2023–present)

Awards and highlights
- Super Bowl champion (LX); Third-team All-ACC (2021)

Career NFL statistics as of 2025
- Receptions: 34
- Receiving yards: 323
- Receiving touchdowns: 3
- Stats at Pro Football Reference

Jackson David Bobo (born August 4, 1998) is an American professional football wide receiver for the Seattle Seahawks of the National Football League (NFL). He played college football for the Duke Blue Devils and UCLA Bruins. He was signed as an undrafted free agent by the Seahawks after the 2023 NFL draft.

== Early life ==
Bobo grew up in North Andover, Massachusetts, and attended the Belmont Hill School. During high school he was a three-time first team All-Independent School League (ISL) selection. As a junior, his team won the Kevin Fleming Bowl to capture the New England Prep School championship. Bobo committed to play college football at Duke over offers from Wake Forest, Boston College, and Army.

== College career ==
College recruiting
Name	Hometown	School	Height	Weight	Commit date
Jake Bobo; WR	Concord, MA	Belmont Hill	6 ft 4 in (1.93 m)	185 lb (84 kg)	Jun 12, 2018
Jake Bobo; WR	Recruit ratings: Rivals: 247Sports: ESPN:				

Bobo began his college career at Duke. He played in all 13 of the Blue Devils' games as a freshman and caught 10 passes for 167 yards and one touchdown. Bobo missed the opening of his sophomore season with a broken collarbone. As a junior, he led Duke with 358 receiving yards on 32 receptions and scored one touchdown. Bobo caught 74 passes for 794 yards and one touchdown in 2021. After the season, Bobo entered the NCAA transfer portal.

Bobo ultimately transferred to UCLA. He caught six passes for 142 yards and two touchdowns in the Bruins' 40–32 upset win over 15th-ranked Washington. Bobo finished the season with 57 receptions for 817 yards and seven touchdowns.

== Professional career ==
Pre-draft measurables
Height	Weight	Arm length	Hand span	Wingspan	40-yard dash	10-yard split	20-yard split	20-yard shuttle	Three-cone drill	Vertical jump	Broad jump
6 ft 4 in (1.93 m)	206 lb (93 kg)	32 1/4 in (0.82 m)	10 in (0.25 m)	6 ft 6 1/4 in (1.99 m)	4.99 s	1.76 s	2.89 s	4.40 s	7.09 s	36.0 in (0.91 m)	9 ft 9 in (2.97 m)
All values from NFL Combine/Pro Day

Following the conclusion of the 2023 NFL draft, the Seattle Seahawks signed Bobo on May 12, 2023 as an undrafted free agent. Following a standout preseason, during which starting wide receiver DK Metcalf praised him as "more detailed than I will ever be," the Seahawks announced that he had made the initial 53-man roster. In a Week 2 win against the Detroit Lions, Bobo caught his first regular-season NFL pass, gaining three yards on a toss from Seahawks quarterback Geno Smith. Bobo caught his first regular-season NFL touchdown during the Week 3 victory over the Carolina Panthers when he came down with a 5-yard jump ball from Smith during the fourth quarter. As a rookie, he appeared in all 17 games. He finished with 19 receptions for 196 yards and two touchdowns. Bobo also scored a rushing touchdown on a three-yard carry, which was his only rushing attempt that season.

In the 2024 season, Bobo had 13 receptions for 107 yards and a touchdown. In the 2025 season, Bobo contributed mainly on special teams. He scored a receiving touchdown in the NFC Championship against the Los Angeles Rams in a 31–27 victory. Bobo played in Super Bowl LX, and earned his first Super Bowl title when the Seahawks defeated the New England Patriots 29–13.

Designated as a restricted free agent in the 2026 offseason, the Seahawks tendered Bobo on March 11, 2026. On March 23, days after being added to the Jacksonville Jaguars' offer sheet, Bobo re-signed with the Seahawks on a two-year contract. He was placed on season-ending injured reserve on August 22 after sustaining a knee injury during a joint practice with the Tennessee Titans.

=== "More Bobo" ===
During training camp in 2023, running backs coach Chad Morton coined the phrase "More Bobo", which was quickly picked up by the locker room in recognition of his consistent performance and playmaking abilities. The phrase grew in popularity among both teammates and fans, with multiple teammates including starters Kenneth Walker III and Geno Smith, repeating it during press conferences; the Associated Press and the Seahawks organization noted the use of the #MoreBobo hashtag among fans.

== Career statistics ==
=== NFL ===
Legend
**Bold**	Career high

Regular season

Year	Team	Games		Receiving					Rushing					Fumbles	
Year	Team	GP	GS	Rec	Yds	Avg	Lng	TD	Att	Yds	Avg	Lng	TD	Fum	Lost
2023	SEA	**17**	0	**19**	**196**	**10.3**	**31**	**2**	**1**	**3**	**3.0**	**3**	**1**	0	0
2024	SEA	17	**3**	13	107	8.2	15	1	0	0	0	0	0	0	0
2025	SEA	11	0	2	20	10.0	17	0	0	0	0	0	0	0	0
Career		45	3	34	323	9.5	31	3	1	3	3.0	3	1	0	0

Postseason

Year	Team	Games		Receiving					Rushing					Fumbles	
Year	Team	GP	GS	Rec	Yds	Avg	Lng	TD	Att	Yds	Avg	Lng	TD	Fum	Lost
2025	SEA	3	0	2	33	16.5	17	1	0	0	0	0	0	0	0
Career		2	0	2	33	16.5	17	1	0	0	0.0	0	0	0	0

=== College ===
Season	Team	GP	Receiving			
Season	Team	GP	Rec	Yds	Avg	TD
2018	Duke	10	10	167	**16.7**	1
2019	Duke	8	10	122	12.2	0
2020	Duke	11	32	358	11.2	1
2021	Duke	12	**74**	794	10.7	1
2022	UCLA	**13**	57	**817**	14.3	**7**
Career		54	183	2,258	12.3	10

=== High school ===
Belmont Hill Sextants
Season	Rec	Yards	Avg	TD
2015	30	652	21.7	5
2016	31	632	20.4	10
2017	34	514	15.1	5

== Personal life ==
Bobo is the son of Mike and Casey Bobo, who both graduated from Dartmouth College. Mike played college football at Dartmouth as a wide receiver, where he helped the Big Green to an Ivy League championship, but is not the same Mike Bobo who is currently the offensive coordinator for the Georgia Bulldogs. Bobo's grandfather, Keith Bobo, played quarterback at SMU and was a 12th round selection of the Dallas Cowboys in the 1974 NFL draft. On June 27, 2026, Bobo married his college sweetheart Mackenzie Cole at the Duke University Chapel in Durham, North Carolina.
