= Ryan Gunderson (American football) =

American football player and coach (born 1984)

Current position
- Title: Quarterbacks coach
- Team: Utah
- Conference: Big 12

Biographical details
- Born: September 22, 1984 (age 42); Portland, Oregon, U.S.

Playing career
- 2003–2007: Oregon State
- Position: Quarterback

Coaching career (HC unless noted)
- 2008–2009: Oregon State (GA)
- 2017: San Jose State (QB)
- 2018–2020: San Jose State (QB/PGC)
- 2021–2023: UCLA (QB)
- 2024–2025: Oregon State (OC/QB)
- 2026–present: Utah (QB)

Administrative career (AD unless noted)
- 2010–2013: Oregon State (asst. director of player personnel)
- 2014: Oregon State (director of player personnel)
- 2015–2016: Nebraska (director of player personnel)

Ryan Gunderson (born September 22, 1984) is an American football coach and former player who is the quarterbacks coach at the University of Utah. He was most recently the offensive coordinator and the quarterbacks coach at Oregon State University. He previously served as the quarterbacks coach at University of California, Los Angeles (UCLA) and quarterbacks coach and passing game coordinator at San Jose State University.

== Playing career ==
Gunderson played quarterback at Oregon State from 2003 to 2007, spending most of his career as a backup quarterback. The only start of his career was the annual Civil War matchup against Oregon in 2005, where he threw four interceptions and lost a fumble in a 56–14 loss. He was named a team captain his senior year at OSU in 2007.

== Coaching career ==
=== Oregon State ===
After graduating with a degree in construction engineering management in 2007, Gunderson chose to pursue a career in football rather than a job in engineering and joined the coaching staff at Oregon State as a graduate assistant. He lived with Oregon State offensive coordinator Danny Langsdorf and Mike Riley’s student assistant during his time as a graduate assistant, with the Langsdorfs calling him "their first child". He was named the assistant director of player personnel in 2010, a tailor-made position for Gunderson that was created by head coach Mike Riley.

=== Nebraska ===
When Riley departed Oregon State to accept the head coaching position at Nebraska in December 2014, Gunderson joined him as his director of player personnel.

=== San Jose State ===
Gunderson was named the quarterbacks coach at San Jose State in 2017. He added the title of passing game coordinator in 2018.

Gunderson was a nominee for the Broyles Award in 2019, given to the best assistant coach in college football.

=== UCLA ===
Gunderson was named the quarterbacks coach at UCLA on February 19, 2021.

=== Oregon State (second stint) ===
On December 4, 2023, Gunderson was hired as the offensive coordinator and quarterbacks coach at Oregon State University, his alma mater, under head coach Trent Bray.

=== Utah ===
On January 8, 2026, Gunderson was hired as the quarterbacks coach at the University of Utah under head coach Morgan Scalley.
