= Ben Sauls =

American football player (born 2001)

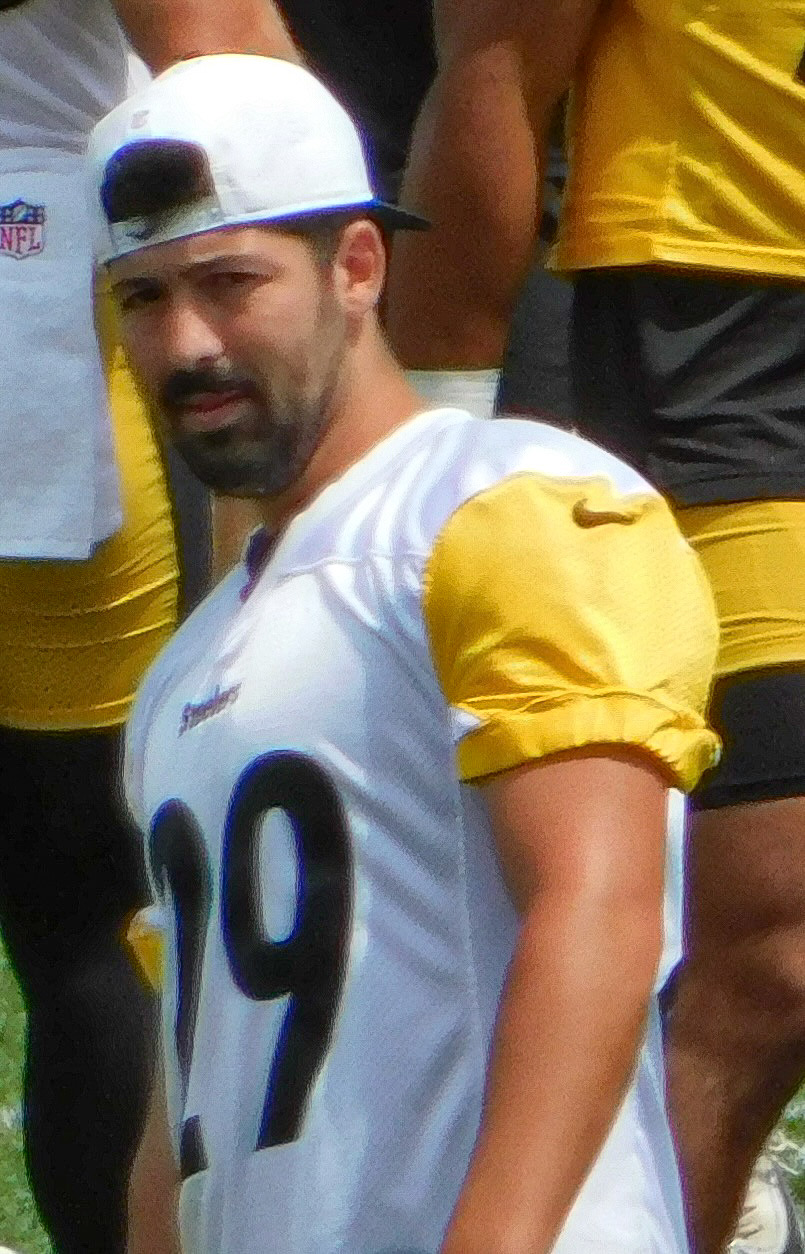
- Sauls with the Pittsburgh Steelers in 2025

Profile
- Position: Kicker

Personal information
- Born: July 31, 2001 (age 25); Tipp City, Ohio, U.S.
- Listed height: 5 ft 10 in (1.78 m)
- Listed weight: 182 lb (83 kg)

Career information
- High school: Tippecanoe (Tipp City)
- College: Pittsburgh (2020–2024)
- NFL draft: 2025: undrafted

Career history
- Pittsburgh Steelers (2025)*; Atlanta Falcons (2025)*; New York Giants (2025)
- * Offseason or practice squad member only

Awards and highlights
- Third-team All-ACC (2024)

Career NFL statistics as of 2025
- Field goals made: 8
- Field goals attempted: 8
- Field goal %: 100.0
- Extra points made: 7
- Extra points attempted: 7
- Extra point %: 100.0
- Longest field goal: 45
- Touchbacks: 5
- Stats at Pro Football Reference

Ben Sauls (born July 31, 2001) is an American professional football kicker. He played college football for the Pittsburgh Panthers.

== Early life ==
Sauls attended Tippecanoe High School in Tipp City, Ohio, where he broke the field goal record twice in one game. He first committed to play college football at Boston College before changing his commitment to Iowa State following the firing of Steve Addazio. He then made his final commitment to the Pittsburgh Panthers, where he joined the team on a full scholarship.

== College career ==
In his first two collegiate seasons in 2020 and 2021, Sauls appeared in 15 games where he attempted a total of five extra points, making three of them. In the 2022 Sun Bowl against UCLA, he converted on all five of his field goal attempts, including a game-winning 47-yarder. In 2022, Sauls made all 47 of his extra point attempts and converted on 20 of 24 field goals. In 2023, Sauls made 11 of 16 total field goals. In week 2 of the 2024 season, he made a notable game-winning 35-yard field goal to beat Cincinnati. In week 6, he tied the Pittsburgh record converting on a 58-yard field goal in a win over California. For his performance during the 2024 season, Sauls earned third-team all-ACC and first-team all-American honors and was named a Lou Groza Award semifinalist. He also accepted an invite to play in the 2025 East-West Shrine Bowl.

== Professional career ==
Pre-draft measurables
Height	Weight	Arm length	Hand span	Wingspan
5 ft 9 7/8 in (1.77 m)	182 lb (83 kg)	29 in (0.74 m)	9 5/8 in (0.24 m)	5 ft 11 1/2 in (1.82 m)
All values from NFL Combine

=== Pittsburgh Steelers ===
Sauls signed with the Pittsburgh Steelers as an undrafted free agent on April 26, 2025. He was waived on August 25.

=== Atlanta Falcons ===
On September 23, 2025, the Atlanta Falcons signed Sauls to their practice squad. He was released on November 4.

=== New York Giants ===
On November 11, 2025, Sauls signed with the New York Giants' practice squad. On December 21, Sauls made his first professional start against the Minnesota Vikings, becoming the first left footed kicker in the league to appear in a regular season game since Sebastian Janikowski in the 2018 season. He was signed to the active roster on December 27.

On August 30, 2026, Sauls was waived by the Giants with an injury settlement.
