= Kazmeir Allen =

American football player (born 2000)

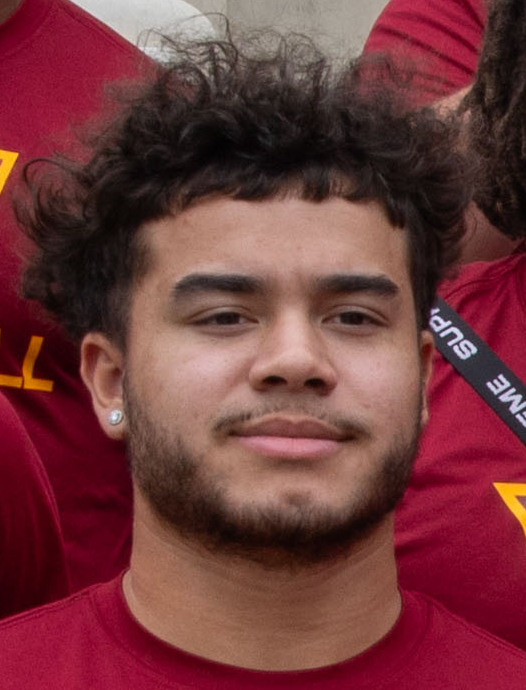
- Allen in 2023

Profile
- Position: Running back

Personal information
- Born: February 29, 2000 (age 26); Tulare, California, U.S.
- Listed height: 5 ft 8 in (1.73 m)
- Listed weight: 176 lb (80 kg)

Career information
- High school: Tulare Union (Tulare)
- College: UCLA (2018–2022)
- NFL draft: 2023: undrafted

Career history
- Washington Commanders (2023–2024)*
- * Offseason or practice squad member only
- Stats at Pro Football Reference

Kazmeir Allen (born February 29, 2000) was an American professional football running back. He played college football for the UCLA Bruins and signed with the Washington Commanders as an undrafted free agent in 2023.

== Early life ==
Allen was born on February 29, 2000, in Tulare, California. He attended Tulare Union High School, where he set the high school scoring record as a senior in 2017 with 72 total touchdowns: 62 from rushing, nine from receptions, and one kickoff return. Allen also helped Tulare Union win the 2017 Central Section Division II championship and finished his high school career with 6,276 rushing yards, 1,603 receiving yards, and 121 total touchdowns. He also finished first in the 100-meter dash at the 2018 California Interscholastic Federation (CIF) state finals with a time of 10.44s.

== College career ==
Allen signed a National Letter of Intent to play college football for the Bruins at the University of California, Los Angeles (UCLA). He played four years as a running back before moving to wide receiver in 2022. Allen played in 38 games with UCLA, recording 550 rushing yards and 762 receiving yards with 12 total touchdowns. He also finished 19th in the 100-meter dash at the 2019 Pac-12 track and field championships with a time of 10.61s.

== Professional career ==
Pre-draft measurables
Height	Weight	Arm length	Hand span	40-yard dash	10-yard split	20-yard split	20-yard shuttle	Three-cone drill	Vertical jump	Broad jump	Bench press
5 ft 8 3/8 in (1.74 m)	183 lb (83 kg)	29 1/8 in (0.74 m)	8 3/4 in (0.22 m)	4.54 s	1.64 s	2.68 s	4.41 s	7.09 s	31.0 in (0.79 m)	9 ft 6 in (2.90 m)	17 reps

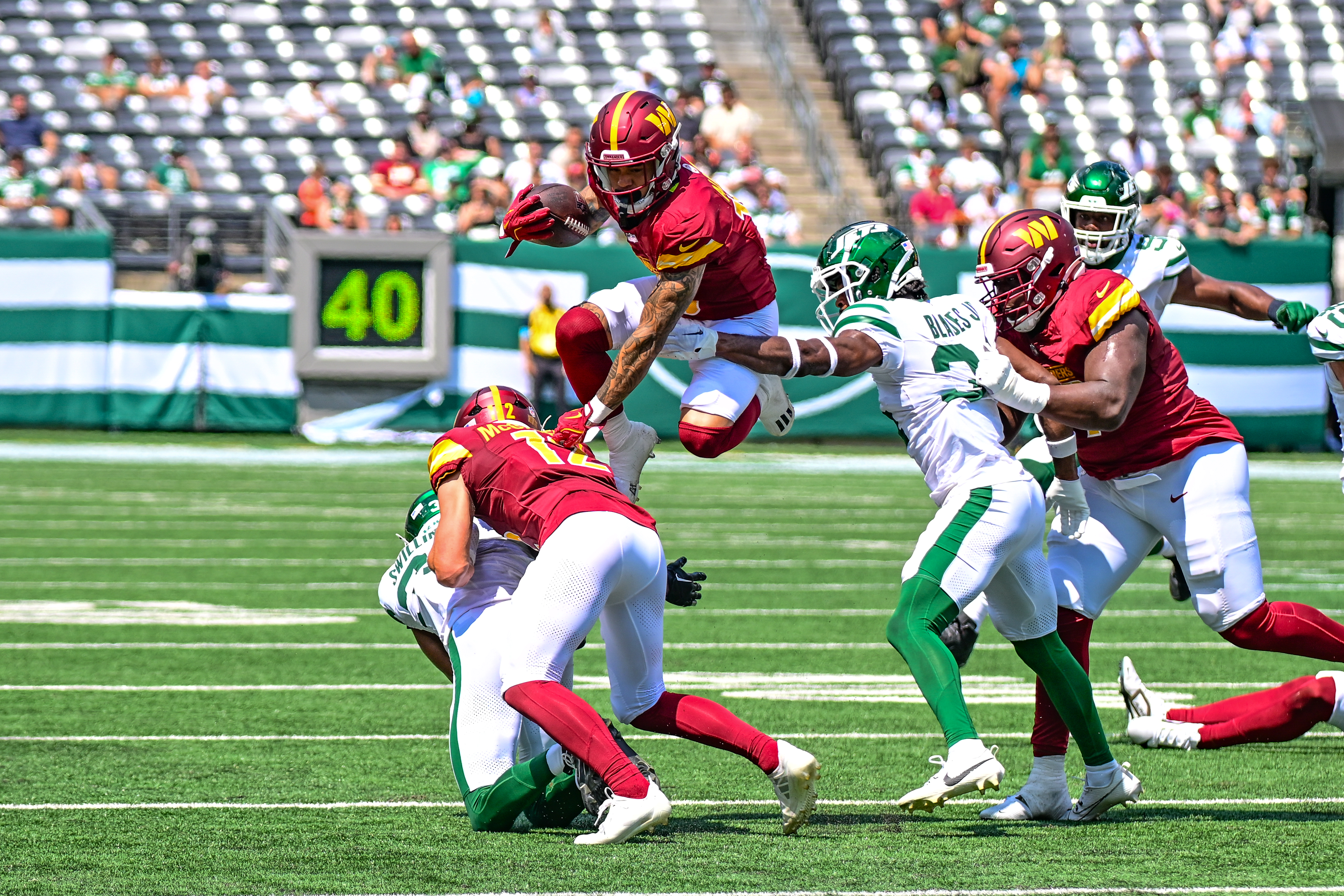
Allen in a game with the Washington Commanders, 2024

Allen signed with the Washington Commanders as an undrafted free agent in May 2023. He was waived on August 29, 2023, and re-signed to the practice squad. He re-signed on February 22, 2024. Allen was waived by the team on August 27, 2024, and joined their practice squad the following day. He was placed on injured reserve on December 17, 2024, for an ankle injury suffered during practice. On January 28, 2025, Allen signed a reserve/future contract with the Commanders. He was released on August 27, 2025.
