= 2022 Cincinnati Bearcats football team =

American college football season

2022 Cincinnati Bearcats football

Fenway Bowl, L 7–24 vs. Louisville
- Conference: American Athletic Conference
- Record: 9–4 (6–2 AAC)
- Head coach: Luke Fickell (6th season; regular season); Kerry Coombs (interim; bowl game)
- Offensive coordinator: Gino Guidugli (1st season)
- Offensive scheme: Multiple
- Defensive coordinator: Mike Tressel (2nd season)
- Co-defensive coordinator: Colin Hitschler (1st season)
- Base defense: 3–3–5
- Home stadium: Nippert Stadium

2022 American Athletic Conference football standings
	Conf.			Overall
Team	W		L	W		L
No. 9 Tulane y$	7	–	1	12	–	2
UCF y	6	–	2	9	–	5
Cincinnati	6	–	2	9	–	4
SMU	5	–	3	7	–	6
Houston	5	–	3	8	–	5
East Carolina	4	–	4	8	–	5
Navy	4	–	4	4	–	8
Memphis	3	–	5	7	–	6
Tulsa	3	–	5	5	–	7
Temple	1	–	7	3	–	9
South Florida	0	–	8	1	–	11
Championship: Tulane 45, UCF 28
$ – Conference champion; y – Championship game participant; Rankings from AP Poll

The 2022 Cincinnati Bearcats football team represented the University of Cincinnati during the 2022 NCAA Division I FBS football season. The Bearcats, members of the American Athletic Conference, played their home games at Nippert Stadium in Cincinnati, Ohio. 2022 was the program's sixth and final season under head coach Luke Fickell.

In September 2021, Cincinnati, Houston, and UCF accepted bids to join the Big 12. On June 10, the American Athletic Conference and the three schools set to depart from the league (Cincinnati, Houston, UCF) announced that they had reached a buyout agreement that allowed those schools to join the Big 12 Conference in 2023. The 2022 season was the program's last season as a member of the AAC.

== Offseason ==
=== NFL draft ===
Nine Bearcats were selected in the 2022 NFL Draft, which was a school record, and was the third most of any school in the draft.

Player	Position	Team	Round	Pick
Sauce Gardner	CB	New York Jets	1	4
Alec Pierce	WR	Indianapolis Colts	2	53
Bryan Cook	S	Kansas City Chiefs	2	62
Desmond Ridder	QB	Atlanta Falcons	3	74
Myjai Sanders	OLB	Arizona Cardinals	3	100
Coby Bryant	CB	Seattle Seahawks	4	109
Jerome Ford	RB	Cleveland Browns	5	156
Darrian Beavers	LB	New York Giants	6	182
Curtis Brooks	DT	Indianapolis Colts	6	216

=== Coaching changes ===
On January 1, 2022, offensive coordinator Mike Denbrock who had been the Bearcats offensive coordinator the last five years left the school to take the same role at LSU. On January 5, 2022, Brian Mason who had been with Cincinnati for the previous 5 seasons, including the last four as special teams coordinator was hired by Notre Dame in the same role. On January 13, 2022, it was reported that cornerbacks coach Perry Eliano who spent the last two years at Cincinnati had accepted the safeties coaching job at Ohio State.

On January 17, 2022, The Athletic reported that UC was promoting quarterbacks coach Gino Guidugli to Offensive coordinator, and that Wide receivers coach Mike Brown was expected to add the role of passing game coordinator, previously held by Guidugli. Cincinnati also promoted Safeties coach Colin Hitschler to Co-defensive coordinator. Also on January 17, 2022 it was announced that Cincinnati was hiring current Central Michigan offensive line coach Mike Cummings in the same role at Cincinnati.

On January 18, 2022, The Athletic reported that Kerry Coombs was being hired as the new cornerbacks coach and special teams coordinator. Coombs joins Cincinnati after serving most recently as defensive coordinator at Ohio State the previous two seasons. He also was an assistant coach at Ohio State from 2012 to 2017 where he developed five first-round NFL draft picks. Coombs previously coached at Cincinnati from 2007 to 2011, overseeing defensive backs and special teams. Additionally, he coached with the Tennessee Titans (2017–18) and was head coach at Colerain High School, from 1991 to 2006.

On January 19, 2022, Cincinnati hired former Bearcats defensive linemen Walter Stewart to coach outside linebackers, Stewart played at Cincinnati 2008–2012. Prior to returning to Cincinnati Stewart coached at defensive line at Arkansas State. From 2019–2021 he was the defensive line coach at Temple, Defensive line at Northern Illinois in 2018. Prior to NIU Stewart was defensive line coach at Eastern Kentucky from 2016 and 2017. In 2015, Stewart coached defensive ends at Florida A&M after being on the Tennessee staff from 2013–14.

On February 21, 2022, Cincinnati announced it has promoted offensive graduate assistant Nate Letton to tight ends coach.

On March 3, 2022, it was reported that Greg Scruggs accepted an assistant defensive line coach position with the New York Jets. After the departure of Scruggs, Walter Stewart was promoted to become the defensive line coach and James Ross III was hired as the outside linebackers coach.

=== Offseason departures ===
2022 Cincinnati offseason departures
Name	Number	Pos.	Height	Weight	Year	Hometown	Notes
Darrian Beavers	0	LB	6' 4"	255	Graduate Student	Cincinnati, OH	Graduated
Sauce Gardner	1	CB	6' 3"	200	Junior	Detroit, MI	Declared for NFL draft
Bryan Cook	6	S	6' 1"	210	Senior	Cincinnati, OH	Graduated
Coby Bryant	7	CB	6' 1"	198	Graduate Student	Cleveland, OH	Graduated
Michael Young Jr.	8	WR	5' 10"	195	Graduate Student	Saint Rose, LA	Graduated
Desmond Ridder	9	QB	6' 4"	215	(redshirt) Senior	Louisville, KY	Graduated
Alec Pierce	12	WR	6' 3"	213	Senior	Glen Ellyn, IL	Graduated
Cole Smith	17	K	5' 11"	193	Senior	Middletown, OH	Graduated
Myjai Sanders	21	DL	6' 5"	258	Senior	Jacksonville, FL	Graduated
Jerome Ford	24	RB	5’ 11”	220	(redshirt) Junior	Seffner, FL	Declared for NFL Draft
Michael Kopaygorodsky	30	RB	6' 0"	215	(redshirt) Senior	Mason, OH	Graduated
Casey Kirk	31	CB	5' 10"	190	(redshirt) Senior	Dublin, OH	Graduated
Ryan Royer	35	LB	5' 11"	218	(redshirt) Senior	Hilliard, OH	Graduated
Joel Dublanko	41	LB	6' 3"	240	Graduate Student	Aberdeen, WA	Graduated
Vincent McConnell	77	OL	6' 5"	300	(redshirt) Senior	Massillon, OH	Graduated
Noah Davis	82	TE	6' 4"	244	Graduate Student	Cincinnati, OH	Graduated
Miles Manigault	91	DL	6' 2"	280	(redshirt) Senior	Cincinnati, OH	Graduated
Curtis Brooks	92	DL	6' 2"	285	Graduate Student	Danville, VA	Graduated
Marcus Brown	99	DL	6' 2"	297	Graduate Student	Naples, FL	Graduated

==== Transfers ====
Outgoing

Name	Pos.	Height	Weight	Year	Hometown	New School
De'Arre McDonald	S	6' 1"	205	(redshirt) Sophomore	Murfreesboro, TN	Middle Tennessee
Marquez Bell	WR	6' 0"	160	(redshirt) Freshman	Lake City, FL	Old Dominion
Marcelo Mendiola	OL	6' 5"	285	(redshirt) Sophomore	Chicago, IL	Bowling Green
Zeiqui Lawton	DE	6' 3"	240	Freshman	Charleston, WV	West Virginia
Joey Groeber	OL	6' 3"	330	Senior	Williamsburg, OH	Youngstown State
Mychal Keys	DL	6' 4"	246	(redshirt) Junior	Columbus, OH	
Jordan Jones	WR	6' 2"	190	(redshirt) Senior	Smackover, AR	Missouri State
Jack Perry	QB	6' 1"	201	Senior	Mountain View, CA	Western Illinois
Alex Bales	K	6' 0"	168	Junior	Westfield, IN	Oregon
Jalen Monrrow	DE	6' 4"	258	Sophomore	Lafayette, IN	Illinois State
Sterling Miles	DE	6' 5"	220	Freshman	West Bloomfield, MI	Eastern Michigan
Iesa Jarmon	CB	6' 0"	175	Freshman	Cincinnati, OH	Buffalo

Incoming

Name	Pos.	Height	Weight	Year	Hometown	Prev. School
Ryan Coe	K	6' 3"	225	Senior	McDonald, PA	Delaware
Ivan Pace Jr.	LB	6' 0"	239	Senior	Cincinnati, OH	Miami (OH)
Ben Bryant	QB	6' 3"	214	Graduate Student	LaGrange, IL	Eastern Michigan
Nick Mardner	WR	6' 6"	190	(redshirt) Senior	Mississauga, Canada	Hawaii
Dartanyan Tinsley	OL	6' 5"	315	Senior	Owensboro, KY	Kentucky Christian
Corey Kiner	RB	5' 10"	213	Sophomore	Cincinnati, OH	LSU
Noah Potter	DL	6' 5"	250	Sophomore	Mentor, OH	Ohio State

=== Recruiting ===
College recruiting (2022)
Name	Hometown	School	Height	Weight	Commit date
Mario Eugenio; DE	Tampa, Florida	Gaither High School	6 ft 3 in (1.91 m)	240 lb (110 kg)	Nov 27, 2021
Mario Eugenio; DE	Recruit ratings: Rivals: 247Sports: ESPN:				
Derrick Shepard; DT	Kettering, Ohio	Archbishop Alter High School	6 ft 3 in (1.91 m)	295 lb (134 kg)	Dec 11, 2020
Derrick Shepard; DT	Recruit ratings: Rivals: 247Sports: ESPN:				
Oliver Bridges; CB	Potomac, Maryland	The Bullis School	6 ft 2 in (1.88 m)	180 lb (82 kg)	Aug 1, 2021
Oliver Bridges; CB	Recruit ratings: Rivals: 247Sports: ESPN:				
J.Q. Hardaway; CB	Phenix City, Alabama	Central High School	6 ft 2 in (1.88 m)	175 lb (79 kg)	Jul 15, 2021
J.Q. Hardaway; CB	Recruit ratings: Rivals: 247Sports: ESPN:				
Stephan Byrd; RB	Canal Winchester, Ohio	Canal Winchester High School	6 ft 0 in (1.83 m)	195 lb (88 kg)	Nov 9, 2020
Stephan Byrd; RB	Recruit ratings: Rivals: 247Sports: ESPN:				
Jovanni Bermudez; WR	Egg Harbor City, New Jersey	Cedar Creek High School	5 ft 10 in (1.78 m)	170 lb (77 kg)	Nov 15, 2021
Jovanni Bermudez; WR	Recruit ratings: Rivals: 247Sports: ESPN:				
Marcus Peterson; TE	Lake City, Florida	Columbia High School	6 ft 3 in (1.91 m)	200 lb (91 kg)	Jun 27, 2021
Marcus Peterson; TE	Recruit ratings: Rivals: 247Sports: ESPN:				
C.J. Doggette Jr. DL	Pickerington, Ohio	Pickerington Central High School	6 ft 2 in (1.88 m)	270 lb (120 kg)	Mar 6, 2021
C.J. Doggette Jr. DL	Recruit ratings: Rivals: 247Sports: ESPN:				
Ethan Green; OT	Fremont, Ohio	Fremont Ross High School	6 ft 7 in (2.01 m)	255 lb (116 kg)	Feb 2, 2021
Ethan Green; OT	Recruit ratings: Rivals: 247Sports: ESPN:				
Kalen Carroll; CB	Greenwood, Indiana	Center Grove High School	6 ft 1 in (1.85 m)	170 lb (77 kg)	Jul 6, 2021
Kalen Carroll; CB	Recruit ratings: Rivals: 247Sports: ESPN:				
Luther Richesson; QB	Nashville, Tennessee	David Lipscomb High School	6 ft 3 in (1.91 m)	205 lb (93 kg)	Nov 10, 2021
Luther Richesson; QB	Recruit ratings: Rivals: 247Sports:				
Quincy Burroughs; WR	Jacksonville, Florida	Raines High School	6 ft 2 in (1.88 m)	180 lb (82 kg)	Feb 10, 2021
Quincy Burroughs; WR	Recruit ratings: Rivals: 247Sports: ESPN:				
Patrick Body Jr. CB	Monroeville, Pennsylvania	Gateway High School	6 ft 1 in (1.85 m)	184 lb (83 kg)	Jul 10, 2021
Patrick Body Jr. CB	Recruit ratings: Rivals: 247Sports: ESPN:				
Cincear Lewis; S	Kalamazoo, Michigan	Kalamazoo Central High School	6 ft 2 in (1.88 m)	185 lb (84 kg)	Apr 13, 2021
Cincear Lewis; S	Recruit ratings: Rivals: 247Sports: ESPN:				
Tyler Gillison; DL	Pickerington, Ohio	Pickerington Central High School	6 ft 4 in (1.93 m)	240 lb (110 kg)	Mar 13, 2021
Tyler Gillison; DL	Recruit ratings: Rivals: 247Sports: ESPN:				
Jonathan Thompson; LB	Columbus, Ohio	St. Francis De Sales High School	6 ft 2 in (1.88 m)	220 lb (100 kg)	Mar 27, 2021
Jonathan Thompson; LB	Recruit ratings: Rivals: 247Sports: ESPN:				
Luke Dalton; OT	Woodstock, Illinois	Marian Central Catholic High School	6 ft 5 in (1.96 m)	300 lb (140 kg)	Aug 8, 2021
Luke Dalton; OT	Recruit ratings: Rivals: 247Sports: ESPN:				
Jonathan Harder; OT	Lewis Center, Ohio	Olentangy High School	6 ft 5 in (1.96 m)	285 lb (129 kg)	Aug 1, 2021
Jonathan Harder; OT	Recruit ratings: Rivals: 247Sports: ESPN:				
Ken Willis; CB	Cincinnati, Ohio	Colerain High School	5 ft 11 in (1.80 m)	160 lb (73 kg)	Jun 21, 2021
Ken Willis; CB	Recruit ratings: Rivals: 247Sports: ESPN:				
Overall recruit ranking: Rivals: 42 247Sports: 48
Note: In many cases, Scout, Rivals, 247Sports, On3, and ESPN may conflict in their listings of height and weight.; In these cases, the average was taken. ESPN grades are on a 100-point scale.; Sources: "2022 Cincinnati Football Commitment List". Rivals.; "2022 Players Commitments – Cincinnati". ESPN.; "2022 Team Ranking". Rivals.com.; "2022 Cincinnati Bearcats football team". 247Sports.

== Preseason ==
=== Award watch lists ===
Listed in the order that they were released

Award	Player	Position	Year
Dodd Trophy	Luke Fickell	HC	
Biletnikoff Award	Nick Mardner	WR	Sr.
John Mackey Award	Josh Whyle	TE	Sr.
John Mackey Award	Leonard Taylor	TE	Sr.
Butkus Award	Deshawn Pace	LB	Jr.
Butkus Award	Ivan Pace Jr.	LB	Sr.
Outland Trophy	Dylan O'Quinn	OL	(redshirt) Sr.
Outland Trophy	Jake Renfro	OL	Jr.
Bronko Nagurski Trophy	Deshawn Pace	LB	Jr.
Bronko Nagurski Trophy	Ivan Pace Jr.	LB	Sr.
Lou Groza Award	Ryan Coe	K	Sr.
Wuerffel Trophy	Wilson Huber	LB	(redshirt) Sr.
Allstate AFCA Good Works Team	Wilson Huber	LB	(redshirt) Sr.
Paul Hornung Award	Ryan Montgomery	RB	Sr.
Chuck Bednarik Award	Deshawn Pace	LB	Jr.
Chuck Bednarik Award	Ivan Pace Jr.	LB	Sr.
Lombardi Award	Lorenz Metz	OL	(redshirt) Sr.

=== American Athletic Conference preseason media poll ===
The American Athletic Conference preseason media poll was released at AAC Media Day on July 28, 2022. Cincinnati, the defending champions, were narrowly pipped by Houston to be preseason favorites, while obtaining 3 more votes for No.1.

Media poll
Predicted finish	Team	Votes (1st place)
1	Houston	243 (7)
2	Cincinnati	242 (10)
3	UCF	225 (7)
4	SMU	187
5	Memphis	162
6	East Carolina	157
7	Tulane	115
8	Tulsa	93
9	South Florida	71
10	Navy	61
11	Temple	28

== Schedule ==
The Bearcats' 2022 schedule consisted of six home games, five away games, and one neutral site game. Cincinnati hosted two of its four non-conference games; against Kennesaw State (FCS) and Indiana. The Bearcats traveled to Arkansas to open the season in a one-game non-conference matchup, and played a neutral site matchup vs. Miami (OH) at Paycor Stadium in the battle for the Victory Bell rivalry game.

Date	Time	Opponent	Rank	Site	TV	Result	Attendance
September 3	3:30 p.m.	at No. 19 Arkansas*	No. 23	Donald W. Reynolds Razorback Stadium; Fayetteville, AR (SEC Nation)	ESPN	L 24–31	74,751
September 10	3:30 p.m.	No. 19 (FCS) Kennesaw State*		Nippert Stadium; Cincinnati, OH	ESPN+	W 63–10	39,014
September 17	12:00 p.m.	vs. Miami (OH)*		Paycor Stadium; Cincinnati, OH (Victory Bell)	ESPNU	W 38–17	30,109
September 24	3:30 p.m.	Indiana*		Nippert Stadium; Cincinnati, OH	ESPN2	W 45–24	38,464
October 1	7:00 p.m.	at Tulsa		Skelly Field at H. A. Chapman Stadium; Tulsa, OK	ESPNU	W 31–21	21,111
October 8	2:30 p.m.	South Florida^{†}	No. 24	Nippert Stadium; Cincinnati, OH	ESPN+	W 28–24	38,577
October 22	12:00 p.m.	at SMU	No. 21	Gerald J. Ford Stadium; University Park, TX	ESPN	W 29–27	23,566
October 29	3:30 p.m.	at UCF	No. 20	FBC Mortgage Stadium; Orlando, FL (rivalry)	ESPN	L 21–25	44,313
November 5	4:00 p.m.	Navy		Nippert Stadium; Cincinnati, OH	ESPNU	W 20–10	38,461
November 11	8:00 p.m.	East Carolina		Nippert Stadium; Cincinnati, OH	ESPN2	W 27–25	38,199
November 19	4:00 p.m.	at Temple	No. 25	Lincoln Financial Field; Philadelphia, PA	ESPNU	W 23–3	14,673
November 25	12:00 p.m.	No. 19 Tulane	No. 24	Nippert Stadium; Cincinnati, OH	ABC	L 24–27	37,989
December 17	11:30 a.m.	vs. Louisville*		Fenway Park; Boston, MA (The Keg of Nails, Fenway Bowl)	ESPN	L 7–24	15,000
*Non-conference game; ^{†}Homecoming; Rankings from AP Poll (and CFP Rankings, after November 2) – Released prior to game; All times are in Eastern time

== Game summaries ==
=== at No. 19 Arkansas ===
Game One – No. 23 Cincinnati Bearcats at No. 19 Arkansas Razorbacks

Quarter	1	2	3	4	Total
No. 23 Bearcats	0	0	17	7	24
No. 19 Razorbacks	7	7	10	7	31

at Donald W. Reynolds Razorback Stadium • Fayetteville, Arkansas

- Date: Saturday, September 3, 2022
- Game time: 2:30 p.m. CDT (3:30 EDT)
- Game weather: Sunny • Temperature: 82 °F (28 °C) • Wind: SW 6 mph
- Game attendance: 74,751
- Referee: Jason Autrey
- TV announcers (ESPN): Dave Flemming (play-by-play), Rod Gilmore (analyst), and Tiffany Blackmon (sideline)
- Game summary: ESPN

Game information

First quarter

- (6:18) Arkansas – KJ Jefferson 15 yard rush, Cam Little kick (Drive: 3 plays, 29 yards, 0:55; Arkansas 7–0)

Second quarter

- (0:17) Arkansas – Trey Knox 5 yard pass from KJ Jefferson, Cam Little kick (Drive: 7 plays, 70 yards, 0:57; Arkansas 14–0)

Third quarter

- (10:59) Cincinnati – Corey Kiner 5 yard rush, Ryan Coe kick (Drive: 12 plays, 75 yards, 4:01; Arkansas 14–7)
- (8:00) Arkansas – Jadon Haselwood 19 yard pass from KJ Jefferson, Cam Little kick (Drive: 8 plays, 75 yards, 2:59; Arkansas 21–7)
- (6:50) Cincinnati – Nick Mardner 35 yard pass from Ben Bryant, Ryan Coe kick (Drive: 3 plays, 71 yards, 1:02; Arkansas 21–14)
- (4:44) Cincinnati – Ryan Coe 26 yard field goal (Drive: 4 plays, −5 yards, 1:54; Arkansas 21–17)
- (1:28) Arkansas – Cam Little 32 yard field goal (Drive: 11 plays, 61 yards, 3:16; Arkansas 24–17)

Fourth quarter

- (9:26) Arkansas – Trey Knox 32 yard pass from KJ Jefferson, Cam Little kick (Drive: 2 plays, 49 yards, 0:26; Arkansas 31–17)
- (5:49) Cincinnati – Leonard Taylor 15 yard pass from Ben Bryant, Ryan Coe kick (Drive: 9 plays, 75 yards, 3:37; Arkansas 31–24)

Statistics	CIN	ARK
First downs	24	23
Plays–yards	77–438	72–447
Rushes–yards	31–113	45–224
Passing yards	325	223
Passing: comp–att–int	26–43–1	18–26–0
Turnovers		
Time of possession	31:24	28:36

Team	Category	Player	Statistics
Cincinnati	Passing	Ben Bryant	26–43, 325 yards, 2 TD, 1 INT
Cincinnati	Rushing	Corey Kiner	12 carries, 59 yards, 1 TD
Cincinnati	Receiving	Tyler Scott	5 receptions, 77 yards
Arkansas	Passing	KJ Jefferson	18–26, 223 yards, 3 TD
Arkansas	Rushing	Raheim Sanders	20 carries, 117 yards
Arkansas	Receiving	Trey Knox	6 receptions, 75 yards, 2 TD

=== No. 18 (FCS) Kennesaw State ===
Game Two – FCS No. 18 (FCS) Kennesaw State (0–1) at Cincinnati Bearcats (0–1)

Quarter	1	2	3	4	Total
No. 18 (FCS) Owls	0	3	0	7	10
Bearcats	7	14	21	21	63

at Nippert Stadium • Cincinnati, Ohio

- Date: Saturday, September 10, 2022
- Game time: 3:30 p.m. EDT
- Game weather: Sunny • Temperature: 79 °F (26 °C) • Wind: N/A
- Game attendance: 37,014
- Referee: Kevin Randall
- TV announcers (ESPN+): Tony Simeone (play-by-play) and Taylor McHargue (analyst)
- Game summary: ESPN

Game information

First quarter

- (5:35) Cincinnati – Josh Whyle 17 yard pass from Ben Bryant, Ryan Coe kick (Drive: 5 plays, 41 yards, 1:31; Cincinnati 7–0)

Second quarter

- (12:59) Cincinnati – Leonard Taylor 9 yard pass from Ben Bryant, Ryan Coe kick (Drive: 11 plays, 71 yards, 4:27; Cincinnati 14–0)
- (9:59) Cincinnati – Tyler Scott 21 yard pass from Ben Bryant, Ryan Coe kick (Drive: 4 plays, 34 yards, 1:12; Cincinnati 21–0)
- (4:20) Kennesaw State – Nathan Robertson 40 yard field goal (Drive: 4 plays, 7 yards, 1:41; Cincinnati 21–3)

Third quarter

- (14:15) Cincinnati – Jabari Taylor 23 yard fumble recovery, Ryan Coe kick (Cincinnati 28–3)
- (7:50) Cincinnati – Charles McClelland 5 yard run, Ryan Coe kick (Drive: 10 plays, 68 yards, 4:15; Cincinnati 35–3)
- (4:34) Cincinnati – Ja'Von Hicks 45 Interception return, Ryan Coe kick (Cincinnati 42–3)

Fourth quarter

- (14:11) Cincinnati – Corey Kiner 12 yard run, Ryan Coe kick (Drive: 6 plays, 77 yards, 1:31; Cincinnati 49–3)
- (9:26) Kennesaw State – Preston Daniels 4 yard run, Ryan Coe kick (Drive: 10 plays, 75 yards, 4:45; Cincinnati 49–10)
- (7:44) Cincinnati – Evan Prater 44 yard run, Ryan Coe kick (Drive: 4 plays, 88 yards, 1:42; Cincinnati 56–10)
- (3:36) Cincinnati – Myles Montgomery 76 yard run, Ryan Coe kick (Drive: 1 plays, 76 yards, 0:11; Cincinnati 63–10)

Statistics	KSU	CIN
First downs	15	24
Plays–yards	76–253	53–525
Rushes–yards	61–142	30–232
Passing yards	111	293
Passing: comp–att–int	7–15–1	20–23–0
Turnovers		
Time of possession	38:08	21:52

Team	Category	Player	Statistics
Kennesaw State	Passing	Xavier Shepard	4–11, 60 yards, 0 TD, 1 INT
Kennesaw State	Rushing	Preston Daniels	21 carries, 59 yards, 1 TD
Kennesaw State	Receiving	Iaan Cousin	4 receptions, 71 yards
Cincinnati	Passing	Ben Bryant	16–19, 201 yards, 3 TD
Cincinnati	Rushing	Myles Montgomery	5 carries, 104 yards 1 TD
Cincinnati	Receiving	Jadon Thompson	4 receptions, 68 yards

=== vs. Miami (OH) ===
Game Three – Cincinnati Bearcats (1–1) vs. Miami (Ohio) RedHawks (1–1)

Quarter	1	2	3	4	Total
Bearcats	7	17	7	7	38
RedHawks	10	7	0	0	17

at Paycor Stadium • Cincinnati, Ohio

- Date: Saturday, September 17, 2022
- Game time: 12:00 p.m. EDT
- Game weather: Sunny • Temperature: 79 °F (26 °C) • Wind: 5 mph
- Referee: Tim Rich
- TV announcers (ESPNU): John Schriffen (play-by-play) and Rene Ingoglia (analyst)
- Game summary: ESPN

Game information

First quarter

- (11:34) Miami (OH) – Mac Hippenhammer 36 yard pass from Avon Smith, Graham Nicholson kick (Drive: 7 plays, 75 yards, 3:26; Miami (OH) 7–0)
- (6:04) Miami (OH) – Graham Nicholson 36 yard field goal (Drive: 8 plays, 31 yards, 3:16; Miami (OH) 10–0)
- (2:44) Cincinnati – Charles McClelland 2 yard run, Ryan Coe kick (Drive: 8 plays, 70 yards, 3:20; Miami (OH) 10–7)

Second quarter

- (12:39) Miami (Ohio) – Jack Coldiron 2 yard pass from Avon Smith, Graham Nicholson kick (Drive: 3 plays, 20 yards, 00:46; Miami (OH) 17–7)
- (9:54) Cincinnati – Corey Kiner 1 yard run, Ryan Coe kick (Drive: 7 plays, 75 yards, 02:45; Miami (OH) 17–14)
- (6:11) Cincinnati – Ryan Coe 26 yard field goal (Drive: 7 plays, 39 yards, 02:16; Tied 17–17)
- (0:13) Cincinnati – Nick Mardner 10 yard pass from Ben Bryant, Ryan Coe kick (Drive: 10 plays, 88 yards, 01:54; Cincinnati 24–17)

Third quarter

- (9:03) Cincinnati – Tyler Scott 41 yard pass from Ben Bryant, Ryan Coe kick (Drive: 05 plays, 56 yards, 02:31; Cincinnati 31–17)

Fourth quarter

- (5:33) Cincinnati – Charles McClelland 15 yard run, Ryan Coe kick (Drive: 3 plays, 24 yards, 1:09; Cincinnati 38–17)

Statistics	CIN	MIA
First downs	25	13
Plays–yards	72–478	57–183
Rushes–yards	36–137	36–67
Passing yards	341	116
Passing: comp–att–int	27–36–1	9–21–1
Turnovers		
Time of possession	31:16	28:44

Team	Category	Player	Statistics
Cincinnati	Passing	Ben Bryant	26–35, 337 yards, 2 TD, 1 INT
Cincinnati	Rushing	Charles McClelland	18 carries, 101 yards, 2 TD
Cincinnati	Receiving	Tyler Scott	8 receptions, 119 yards, 1 TD
Miami (OH)	Passing	Aveon Smith	9–21, 116 yards, 2 TD, 1 INT
Miami (OH)	Rushing	Kevin Davis	7 carries, 32 yards
Miami (OH)	Receiving	Mac Hippenhammer	4 receptions, 62 yards, 1 TD

=== Indiana ===
Game Four – Indiana Hoosiers at Cincinnati Bearcats

Quarter	1	2	3	4	Total
Hoosiers	3	7	7	7	24
Bearcats	10	28	0	7	45

at Nippert Stadium • Cincinnati, Ohio

- Date: Saturday, September 24, 2022
- Game time: 3:30 p.m. EDT
- Game weather: Partly Cloudy • Temperature: 75 °F (24 °C) • Wind: 5 mph
- Game attendance: 38,464
- Referee: Luke Richmond
- TV announcers (ESPN2): Beth Mowins (play-by-play), Kirk Morrison (analyst), and Stormy Buonantony (sideline)
- Game summary: ESPN

Game information

First quarter

- (6:00) Cincinnati – Ryan Coe 24 yard field goal (Drive: 4 plays, 0 yards, 2:00; Cincinnati 3–0)
- (1:15) Indiana – Charles Campbell 27 yard field goal (Drive: 16 plays, 66 yards, 4:45; Tied 3–3)
- (1:00) Cincinnati – Tyler Scott 75 yard pass from Ben Bryant, Ryan Coe kick (Drive: 1 play, 75 yards, 0:10; Cincinnati 10–3)

Second quarter

- (12:36) Cincinnati – Tre Tucker 5 yard pass from Ben Bryant, Ryan Coe kick (Drive: 6 plays, 64 yards, 2:13; Cincinnati 17–3)
- (8:06) Indiana – Josh Henderson 19 yard pass from Connor Bazelak, Charles Campbell kick (Drive: 4 plays, 39 yards, 1:05; Cincinnati 17–10)
- (4:33) Cincinnati – Tyler Scott 34 yard pass from Ben Bryant, Ryan Coe kick (Drive: 7 plays, 75 yards, 3:33; Cincinnati 24–10)
- (0:32) Cincinnati – Tyler Scott 32 yard pass from Ben Bryant, Ryan Coe kick (Drive: 7 plays, 80 yards, 2:19; Cincinnati 31–10)
- (0:22) Cincinnati – Dominique Perry 14 yard fumble recovery, Ryan Coe kick (Cincinnati 38–10)

Third quarter

- (10:23) Indiana – Shaun Shivers 2 yard pass from Connor Bazelak, Charles Campbell kick (Drive: 11 plays 51 yards 3:07; Cincinnati 38–17)

Fourth quarter

- (14:01) Indiana – Shawn Shivers 47 yard rush, Charles Campbell kick (Drive: 3 plays 58 yards 0:46; Cincinnati 38–24)
- (14:01) Cincinnati – Corey Kiner 1 yard rush, Ryan Coe kick (Drive: 3 Plays 2 Yards 1:26; Cincinnati 45–24)

Statistics	IU	CIN
First downs	27	15
Plays–yards	104–348	70–394
Rushes–yards	38–68	30–40
Passing yards	280	354
Passing: comp–att–int	31–66–2	24–40–1
Turnovers		
Time of possession	29:01	29:59

Team	Category	Player	Statistics
Indiana	Passing	Connor Bazelak	31–66, 280 yards, 2 TD, 2 INT
Indiana	Rushing	Shaun Shivers	19 carries, 90 yards, 1 TD
Indiana	Receiving	Cam Camper	10 receptions, 126 yards
Cincinnati	Passing	Ben Bryant	24–40, 354 yards, 4 TD, 1 INT
Cincinnati	Rushing	Charles McClelland	9 carries, 25 yards
Cincinnati	Receiving	Tyler Scott	10 receptions, 185 yards, 3 TD

=== at Tulsa ===
Game Five – Cincinnati Bearcats at Tulsa Golden Hurricane

Quarter	1	2	3	4	Total
Bearcats	14	10	7	0	31
Golden Hurricane	7	7	7	0	21

at Skelly Field at H. A. Chapman Stadium • Tulsa, Oklahoma

- Date: Saturday, October 1, 2022
- Game time: 6:00 p.m. CDT (7:00 EDT)
- Game weather: Sunny • Temperature: 81 °F (27 °C) • Wind: NE 6 mph
- Game attendance: 21,111
- Referee: Hank Johns
- TV announcers (ESPNU): Jay Alter (play-by-play) and Hutson Mason (analyst)
- Game summary: ESPN

Game information

First quarter

- (10:23) Cincinnati – Deshawn Pace 18 yard interception, Ryan Coe kick (Cincinnati 7–0)
- (4:55) Tulsa – Braylon Braxton 2 yard rush, Zack Long kick (Drive: 14 plays, 79 yards, 5:23; Tied 7–7)
- (0:27) Cincinnati – Tyler Scott 61 yard pass from Ben Bryant, Ryan Coe kick (Drive: 1 play, 61 yards, 0:10; Cincinnati 14–7)

Second quarter

- (6:49) Cincinnati – Corey Kiner 19 yard rush, Ryan Coe kick (Drive: 14 plays, 79 yards, 5:23; Cincinnati 21–7)
- (1:20) Tulsa – Deneric Prince 8 yard rush, Zack Long kick (Drive: 3 plays, 61 yards, 0:37; Cincinnati 21–14)
- (0:00) Cincinnati – Ryan Coe 39 yard field goal (Drive: 9 plays, 54 yards, 1:20; Cincinnati 24–14)

Third quarter

- (11:09) Tulsa – Deneric Prince 2 yard rush, Zack Long kick (Drive: 8 plays, 75 yards, 3:51; Cincinnati 24–21)
- (14:01) Cincinnati – Josh Whyle 2 yard pass from Ben Bryant, Ryan Coe kick (Drive: 5 plays, 70 yards, 2:32; Cincinnati 31–21)

Fourth quarter

Statistics	CIN	TLS
First downs	15	23
Plays–yards	59–364	83–285
Rushes–yards	32–198	45–36
Passing yards	166	249
Passing: comp–att–int	15–27–1	19–38–2
Turnovers		
Time of possession	25:00	35:00

Team	Category	Player	Statistics
Cincinnati	Passing	Ben Bryant	15–27, 166 yards, 2 TD, 1 INT
Cincinnati	Rushing	Corey Kiner	12 carries, 106 yards, 1 TD
Cincinnati	Receiving	Tyler Scott	5 receptions, 77 yards, 1 TD
Tulsa	Passing	Davis Brin	18–36, 237 yards
Tulsa	Rushing	Deneric Prince	18 carries, 71 yards, 2 TD
Tulsa	Receiving	Keylon Stokes	6 receptions, 106 yards

=== South Florida ===
Game Six – South Florida Bulls at No. 24 Cincinnati Bearcats

Quarter	1	2	3	4	Total
Bulls	10	7	0	7	24
No. 24 Bearcats	7	7	7	7	28

at Nippert Stadium • Cincinnati, Ohio

- Date: Saturday, October 8, 2022
- Game time: 2:30 p.m. EST
- Game weather: Sunny, 53 °F (12 °C)
- Game attendance: 38,577
- Referee: Nate Black
- TV announcers (ESPN+): Richard Cross (play-by-play) and Taylor McHargue (analyst)
- Game summary: ESPN

Game information

First quarter

- (9:24) South Florida – Brian Battie 22 Yd Run, Spencer Shrader Kick (Drive: 11 plays, 75 yards, 5:36; South Florida 7–0)
- (3:16) South Florida – Spencer Shrader 21 yard field goal (Drive: 12 plays, 65 yards, 6:00; South Florida 10–0)
- (0:45) Cincinnati – Jadon Thompson 28 yard pass from Ben Bryant, Ryan Coe kick (Drive: 6 plays, 75 yards, 2:31; South Florida 10–7)

Second quarter

- (10:27) Cincinnati – Nick Mardner 14 yard pass from Ben Bryant, Ryan Coe kick (Drive: 6 plays, 45 yards, 3:00; Cincinnati 14–10)
- (5:03) South Florida – Xavier Weaver 9 yard pass from Gerry Bohanon, Spencer Shrader kick (Drive: 10 plays, 75 yards, 5:24; South Florida 17–14)

Third quarter

- (10:11) Cincinnati – Charles McClelland 1 yard run, Ryan Coe kick (Drive: 10 plays 75 yards 4:49; Cincinnati 21–17)

Fourth quarter

- (14:56) South Florida – Xavier Weaver 16 yard pass from Gerry Bohanon, Spencer Shrader kick (Drive: 5 plays 88 yards 2:22; South Florida 24–21)
- (9:24) Cincinnati – Charles McClelland 1 yard run, Ryan Coe kick (Drive: 2 Plays 50 Yards 0:35; Cincinnati 28–24)

Statistics	USF	CIN
First downs	19	22
Plays–yards	64–363	60–413
Rushes–yards	43–224	37–221
Passing yards	139	193
Passing: comp–att–int	11–21–0	16–23–2
Turnovers		
Time of possession	32:29	27:31

Team	Category	Player	Statistics
South Florida	Passing	Gerry Bohanon	11–21, 139 yards
South Florida	Rushing	Gerry Bohanon	14 carries, 121 yards
South Florida	Receiving	Xavier Weaver	7 receptions, 112 yards, 2 TD
Cincinnati	Passing	Ben Bryant	15–21, 178 yards, 2 TD, 1 INT
Cincinnati	Rushing	Charles McClelland	21 carries, 182 yards, 2 TD
Cincinnati	Receiving	Tre Tucker	7 receptions, 64 yards

=== at SMU ===
Game Seven – Cincinnati Bearcats at SMU Mustangs

Quarter	1	2	3	4	Total
No. 21 Bearcats	10	10	9	0	29
Mustangs	0	14	0	13	27

at Gerald J. Ford Stadium • University Park, Texas

- Date: Saturday, October 22, 2022
- Game time: 11:00 a.m. CDT (12:00 EDT)
- Game weather: Sunny • Temperature: 73 °F (23 °C) • Wind: S 16 mph
- Game attendance: 23,566
- Referee: Kevin Randall
- TV announcers (ESPN): Mark Jones (play-by-play), Robert Griffin III (analyst), and Quint Kessenich (sideline)
- Game summary: ESPN

Game information

First quarter

- (10:55) Cincinnati – Ryan Coe 30 yard field goal (Drive: 4 plays, −3 yards, 1:25; Cincinnati 3–0)
- (0:33) Cincinnati – Ryan Montgomery 1 yard rush, Ryan Coe kick (Drive: 11 plays, 62 yards, 5:38; Cincinnati 10–0)

Second quarter

- (13:34) Cincinnati – Charles McClelland 74 yard run, Ryan Coe kick (Drive: 1 play, 76 yards, 0:12; Cincinnati 17–0)
- (8:12) SMU – TJ McDaniel 9 yard run, Collin Rogers kick (Drive: 2 plays, 46 yards, 0:25; Cincinnati 17–7)
- (4:05) Cincinnati – Ryan Coe 25 yard field goal (Drive: 12 plays, 67 yards, 4:07; Cincinnati 20–7)
- (0:21) SMU – Jordan Kerley 1 yard pass from Tanner Mordecai, Collin Rogers kick (Drive: 13 plays, 77 yards, 3:38; Cincinnati 20–14)

Third quarter

- (10:20) Cincinnati – Ryan Coe 50 yard field goal (Drive: 7 plays, 29 yards, 4:47; Cincinnati 23–14)
- (6:26) Cincinnati – Ryan Coe 44 yard field goal (Drive: 7 plays, 29 yards, 3:32; Cincinnati 26–14)
- (1:58) Cincinnati – Ryan Coe 31 yard field goal (Drive: 6 plays, 37 yards, 2:24; Cincinnati 29–14)

Fourth quarter

- (5:09) SMU – RJ Maryland 16 yard pass from Preston Stone, Collin Rogers kick (Drive: 11 plays, 62 yards, 3:11; Cincinnati 29–21)
- (1:57) SMU – Tyler Levine 1 yard run, 2-point failed (Drive: 9 plays, 82 yards, 1:41; Cincinnati 29–27)

Statistics	CIN	SMU
First downs	16	21
Plays–yards	77–379	71–259
Rushes–yards	42–179	31–80
Passing yards	200	179
Passing: comp–att–int	18–35	21–40–1
Turnovers		
Time of possession	36:46	23:14

Team	Category	Player	Statistics
Cincinnati	Passing	Ben Bryant	18–35, 200 yards
Cincinnati	Rushing	Charles McClelland	16 carries, 129 yards, 1 TD
Cincinnati	Receiving	Jadon Thompson	4 receptions, 69 yards
SMU	Passing	Tanner Mordecai	15–25, 105 yards, 1 TD, 1 INT
SMU	Rushing	Camar Wheaton	8 carries, 53 yards
SMU	Receiving	Jordan Kerley	3 receptions, 44 yards, 1 TD

=== at UCF ===
Game Eight – Cincinnati Bearcats at UCF Knights

Quarter	1	2	3	4	Total
No. 20 Bearcats	0	6	7	8	21
Knights	10	2	0	13	25

at FBC Mortgage Stadium • Orlando, Florida

- Date: Saturday, October 29, 2022
- Game time: 3:30 p.m. EDT
- Game weather: Sunny • Temperature: 82 °F (28 °C) • Wind: NE 10 mph
- Game attendance: 44,313
- Referee: Luke Richmond
- TV announcers (ESPN): Mark Jones (play-by-play), Robert Griffin III (analyst), and Quint Kessenich (sideline)
- Game summary: ESPN

Game information

First quarter

- (8:50) UCF – Colton Boomer 26 yard field goal (Drive: 7 plays, 53 yards, 3:31; UCF 3–0)
- (3:00) UCF – RJ Harvey 26 yard run, Colton Boomer kick (Drive: 10 plays, 84 yards, 4:54; UCF 10–0)

Second quarter

- (9:19) Cincinnati – Ryan Coe 33 yard field goal (Drive: 10 plays, 65 yards, 3:38; UCF 10–3)
- (0:13) Cincinnati – Ryan Coe 33 yard field goal (Drive: 9 plays, 33 yards, 2:09; UCF 10–6)

Third quarter

- (7:52) UCF – Josh Cellscar Safety (UCF 12–6)
- (0:07) Cincinnati – Josh Whyle 14 yard pass from Ben Bryant, Ryan Coe kick (Drive: 10 plays, 84 yards, 3:28; Cincinnati 13–12)

Fourth quarter

- (4:36) UCF – Isaiah Bowser 3 yard run, 2-point pass failed (Drive: 13 plays, 77 yards, 5:07; UCF 18–13)
- (3:04) Cincinnati – Ryan Montgomery 39 yard run, 2-point pass good (Drive: 7 plays, 75 yards, 1:32; Cincinnati 21–18)
- (0:48) UCF – RJ Harvey 17 yard run, Colton Boomer kick (Drive: 7 plays, 75 yards, 2:16; UCF 25–21)

Statistics	CIN	UCF
First downs	18	30
Plays–yards	64–333	84–505
Rushes–yards	18–35	52–258
Passing yards	298	247
Passing: comp–att–int	25–46	22–32
Turnovers		
Time of possession	22:55	37:05

Team	Category	Player	Statistics
Cincinnati	Passing	Ben Bryant	25–45, 298 yards, 1 TD
Cincinnati	Rushing	Ryan Montgomery	3 carries, 40 yards, 1 TD
Cincinnati	Receiving	Tre Tucker	10 receptions, 110 yards
UCF	Passing	Mikey Keene	15–21, 176 yards
UCF	Rushing	RJ Harvey	18 carries, 88 yards, 2 TD
UCF	Receiving	Kobe Hudson	5 receptions, 74 yards

=== Navy ===
Game Nine – Navy Midshipmen at Cincinnati Bearcats

Quarter	1	2	3	4	Total
Midshipmen	0	3	7	0	10
Bearcats	6	7	7	0	20

at Nippert Stadium • Cincinnati, Ohio

- Date: Saturday, November 5, 2022
- Game time: 4:00 p.m. EST
- Game weather: Mostly Cloudy • Temperature: 74 °F (23 °C) • Wind: N 19 mph
- Game attendance: 38,461
- Referee: Nate Black
- TV announcers (ESPNU): Kevin Brown (play-by-play) and Hutson Mason (analyst)
- ESPN

Game information

First quarter

- CIN 13:08 Ryan Coe 47 Yd Field Goal 5 plays, 46 yards, 1:52 UC 3–0
- CIN 5:04 Ryan Coe 27 Yd Field Goal 14 plays, 60 yards, 6:03 UC 6–0

Second quarter

- CIN 7:12 Tyler Scott 38 Yd pass from Ben Bryant (Ryan Coe Kick) 12 plays, 87 yards, 5:01 UC 13–0
- USNA 1:55 Daniel Davies 28 Yd Field Goal 9 plays, 54 yards, 5:17 UC 13–3

Third quarter

- CIN 9:51 Tyler Scott 27 Yd pass from Ben Bryant (Ryan Coe Kick) 8 plays, 98 yards, 2:57 UC 20–3
- USNA 1:14 Maasai Maynor 1 Yd Run (Daniel Davies Kick) 16 plays, 75 yards, 8:37 UC 20–10

Fourth quarter

NONE

Statistics	NAVY	CIN
First downs	15	18
Plays–yards	59–260	55–354
Rushes–yards	53–176	20–55
Passing yards	84	299
Passing: comp–att–int	4–6	25–35
Turnovers		
Time of possession	33:13	26:47

Team	Category	Player	Statistics
Navy	Passing	Maasai Maynor	4–6 81 YDS
Navy	Rushing	Xavier Arline	12 Car 87 YDS
Navy	Receiving	Nathan Kent	1 REC, 32 YDS
Cincinnati	Passing	Ben Bryant	25–35 299 YDS, 2 TDS
Cincinnati	Rushing	Charles McClelland	11 Car, 60 YDS
Cincinnati	Receiving	Tyler Scott	10 REC 132 YDS 2 TDS

=== East Carolina ===
Game Ten – East Carolina Pirates at Cincinnati Bearcats

Quarter	1	2	3	4	Total
Pirates	5	7	13	0	25
Bearcats	7	17	0	3	27

at Nippert Stadium • Cincinnati, Ohio

- Date: Friday, November 11, 2022
- Game time: 8:00 p.m. EST
- Game weather: Clear • Temperature: 58 °F (14 °C) • Wind: SE 12 MPH
- Game attendance: 38,199
- Referee: Henry Johns
- TV announcers (ESPN2): Roy Philpott (play-by-play), Andre Ware (analyst), and Paul Carcaterra (sideline)

Game information

First quarter

- ECU SFT 09:30 SAFETY Bryant Tackled in End Zone, :39 2–0 ECU
- ECU FG 3:14 Andrew Conrad 47 Yd Field Goal 11 plays, 48 yards, 6:16 5–0 ECU
- CIN TD 2:57 Jadon Thompson 100 Yd Kickoff Return (Ryan Coe Kick) :17 7–5 UC

Second quarter

- CIN TD 11:34 Tre Tucker 55 Yd pass from Ben Bryant (Ryan Coe Kick) 6 plays, 72 yards, 1:44 14–5 UC
- CIN TD 7:34 Tyler Scott 76 Yd pass from Ben Bryant (Ryan Coe Kick) 1 play, 76 yards, 0:11 21–5 UC
- ECU TD 6:03 C.J. Johnson 72 Yd pass from Holton Ahlers (Andrew Conrad Kick) 3 plays, 75 yards, 1:31 21–12 UC
- CIN FG 1:48 Ryan Coe 37 Yd Field Goal 11 plays, 49 yards, 4:15 24–12 UC

Third quarter

- ECU TD 10:06 Keaton Mitchell 4 Yd Run (Andrew Conrad Kick) 9 plays, 79 yards, 4:54 24–19 UC
- ECU TD TD 2:02 Jaylen Johnson 15 Yd pass from Holton Ahlers (Two-Point Pass Conversion Failed) 6 plays, 68 yards, 2:35 25–24 ECU

Fourth quarter

- UC FG 9:42 Ryan Coe 21 Yd Field Goal 10 plays, 57 yards, 2:51 27–25 UC

Statistics	ECU	CIN
First downs	22	13
Plays–yards	79–450	57–310
Rushes–yards	33–174	26–66
Passing yards	276	244
Passing: comp–att–int	25–45–0	14–31–1
Turnovers		
Time of possession	36:20	23:34

Team	Category	Player	Statistics
East Carolina	Passing	Holton Ahlers	26–46, 280 yards, 2 TD
East Carolina	Rushing	Keaton Mitchell	16 carries, 112 yards, 1 TD
East Carolina	Receiving	C. J. Johnson	7 receptions, 123 yards, 1 TD
Cincinnati	Passing	Ben Bryant	14–30, 244 yards, 2 TD, 1 INT
Cincinnati	Rushing	Charles McClelland	10 carries, 39 yards
Cincinnati	Receiving	Tyler Scott	7 receptions, 140 yards, 1 TD

=== at Temple ===
Game Eleven – Cincinnati Bearcats at Temple Owls

Quarter	1	2	3	4	Total
No. 25 Bearcats	7	10	3	3	23
Owls	0	3	0	0	3

at Lincoln Financial Field • Philadelphia, Pennsylvania

- Date: Saturday, November 19, 2022
- Game time: 4:00 p.m. EST
- Game weather: Sunny
- Game attendance: 14,673
- Referee: Nate Black
- TV announcers (ESPNU): Noah Reed (play-by-play) and Rene Ingoglia (analyst)

Game information

First quarter

- CIN TD 1:19 Tre Tucker 42 Yd pass from Ben Bryant (Ryan Coe Kick) 4 plays, 66 yards, 1:08 UC 7–0

Second quarter

- CIN TD 14:54 Ryan Montgomery 14 Yd Run (Ryan Coe Kick) 3 plays, 26 yards, 0:44 UC 14–0
- CIN FG 9:55 Ryan Coe 28 Yd Field Goal 9 plays, 28 yards, 2:54 UC 17–0
- TEM FG 8:24 Camden Price 43 Yd Field Goal 6 plays, 50 yards, 1:31 UC 17–3

Third quarter

- CIN FG 7:22 Ryan Coe 37 Yd Field Goal 8 plays, 23 yards, 3:25 UC 20–3

Fourth quarter

- CIN FG 14:40 Ryan Coe 24 Yd Field Goal 12 plays, 74 yards, 5:29 UC 23–3

Statistics	CIN	TEM
First downs	22	13
Plays–yards	78–388	55–202
Rushes–yards	43–131	19–35
Passing yards	257	167
Passing: comp–att–int	21–35	21–36–2
Turnovers		
Time of possession	36:51	23:09

Team	Category	Player	Statistics
Cincinnati	Passing	Ben Bryant	9–18, 130 yards, 1 TD
Cincinnati	Rushing	Ryan Montgomery	14 carries, 58 yards, 1 TD
Cincinnati	Receiving	Tre Tucker	4 receptions, 78 yards, 1 TD
Temple	Passing	E.J. Warner	21–36, 167 yards, 2 INT
Temple	Rushing	Darvon Hubbard	7 carries, 30 yards
Temple	Receiving	Jordan Smith	5 receptions, 40 yards

=== No. 19 Tulane ===
Game Twelve – Tulane Green Wave at Cincinnati Bearcats

Quarter	1	2	3	4	Total
No. 19 Green Wave	3	10	7	7	27
No. 24 Bearcats	0	10	7	7	24

at Nippert Stadium • Cincinnati, Ohio

- Date: Friday, November 25, 2022
- Game time: 12:00 p.m. EST
- Game weather: Cloudy, 50 °F (10 °C)
- Game attendance: 37,989
- Referee: Luke Richmond
- TV announcers (ABC): Roy Philpott (play-by-play), Andre Ware (analyst), and Paul Carcaterra (sideline)

Game information

First quarter

- (5:17) TUL – Valentino Ambrosio 34-yard field goal (Drive: 8 plays, 37 yards, 2:50; Tulane 3–0)

Second quarter

- (14:57) CIN – Ryan Coe 28-yard field goal (Drive: 13 plays, 65 yards, 5:20; Tied 3–3)
- (4:58) TUL – Tyjae Spears 11-yard run, Valentino Ambrosio kick (Drive: 15 plays, 71 yards, 8:25; Tulane 10–3)
- (2:41) CIN – Charles McClelland 35-yard run, Ryan Coe kick (Drive: 7 plays, 75 yards, 2:17; Tied 10–10)
- (0:16) TUL – Valentino Ambrosio 47-yard field goal (Drive: 7 plays, 45 yards, 2:25; Tulane 13–10)

Third quarter

- (6:59) TUL – Tyjae Spears 2-yard run, Valentino Ambrosio kick (Drive: 6 plays, 40 yards, 3:19; Tulane 20–10)
- (0:42) CIN – Ryan Montgomery 8-yard run, Ryan Coe kick (Drive: 14 plays, 75 yards, 6:17; Tulane 20–17)

Fourth quarter

- (6:27) CIN – Ryan Montgomery 15-yard run, Ryan Coe kick (Drive: 13 plays, 63 yards, 4:47; Cincinnati 24–20)
- (5:10) TUL – Duece Watts 30-yard pass from Michael Pratt, Valentino Ambrosio kick (Drive: 4 plays, 75 yards, 1:17; Tulane 27–24)

Statistics	TULN	CIN
First downs	22	19
Plays–yards	70–383	69–337
Rushes–yards	48–221	43–235
Passing yards	162	102
Passing: comp–att–int	13–22–0	10–26–1
Turnovers		
Time of possession	33:59	26:01

Team	Category	Player	Statistics
Tulane	Passing	Michael Pratt	13–22, 162 yards, 1 TD
Tulane	Rushing	Tyjae Spears	35 carries, 181 yards, 2 TD
Tulane	Receiving	Shae Wyatt	3 receptions, 62 yards
Cincinnati	Passing	Evan Prater	10–26, 102 yards, 1 INT
Cincinnati	Rushing	Ryan Montgomery	17 carries, 95 yards, 2 TD
Cincinnati	Receiving	Will Pauling	2 receptions, 41 yards

=== vs. Louisville (Fenway Bowl) ===
2022 Fenway Bowl
Cincinnati Bearcats vs. Louisville Cardinals

Quarter	1	2	3	4	Total
Bearcats	0	7	0	0	7
Cardinals	7	14	3	0	24

at Fenway Park, Boston, Massachusetts

- Date: December 17
- Game time: 11:00 a.m. EST
- Game weather: Cloudy, 37 °F (3 °C)
- Game attendance: 15,000
- Referee: Jeff Servinski
- TV announcers (ESPN/Bowl Season Radio): Chris Cotter (play-by-play), Mark Herzlich (analyst), and Kelsey Riggs (sideline)/Travis Jones (play-by-play), John Denton (analyst), and David Beaudin (sideline)

Game information

First quarter

- (0:21) LOU – Jawhar Jordan 49-yard run, James Turner kick (Drive: 1 play, 49 yards, 0:08; Louisville 7–0)

Second quarter

- (10:58) CIN – Wyatt Fisher 20-yard reception from Evan Prater, Christian Lowery kick (Drive: 9 plays, 73 yards, 4:23; Tied 7–7)
- (5:52) LOU – Marshon Ford 8-yard reception from Brock Domann, James Turner kick (Drive: 10 plays, 66 yards, 5:06; Louisville 14–7)
- (0:42) LOU – Jawhar Jordan 41-yard run, James Turner kick (Drive: 7 plays, 74 yards, 2:47; Louisville 21–7)

Third quarter

- (3:49) LOU – James Turner 48-yard field goal (Drive: 14 plays, 38 yards, 6:21; Louisville 24–7)

Fourth quarter

No scoring plays

Statistics	CIN	LOU
First downs	10	24
Plays–yards	53–127	72–419
Rushes–yards	38–44	40–287
Passing yards	83	132
Passing: comp–att–int	7–15–0	13–23–2
Turnovers	2	4
Time of possession	27:31	32:29

Team	Category	Player	Statistics
Cincinnati	Passing	Evan Prater	7/15, 83 yards, TD
Cincinnati	Rushing	Ethan Wright	8 rushes, 43 yards
Cincinnati	Receiving	Blue Smith	2 receptions, 32 yards
Louisville	Passing	Brock Domann	13/21, 132 yards, TD, INT
Louisville	Rushing	Maurice Turner	31 rushes, 160 yards
Louisville	Receiving	Jaelin Carter	4 receptions, 50 yards

== Personnel ==
=== Roster and staff ===
2022 Cincinnati Bearcats football team roster
Players
Coaches
Offense

Pos.	#	Name	Class
RB	0	Charles McClelland	Sr
RB	2	Corey Kiner	So
QB	3	Evan Prater	Jr
RB	4	Ethan Wright	Jr
QB	6	Ben Bryant	Sr
WR	7	Tre Tucker	Sr
TE	11	Leonard Taylor	Sr
WR	12	Quincy Burroughs	Fr
QB	13	Jacob Hoying	Fr
WR	14	Wyatt Fischer	Sr
WR	15	Nate Meyer	Jr
TE	15	Marcus Peterson	Fr
QB	16	Brady Lichtenberg	Fr
WR	17	Marquez Bell	So
WR	17	JoJo Bermudez	Fr
TE	18	Chamon Metayer	Fr
WR	19	Will Pauling	Fr
WR	20	Jadon Thompson	Jr
WR	21	Tyler Scott	Jr
RB	22	Ryan Montgomery	Sr
WR	23	Drew Donley	Fr
RB	25	Shaun Thomas	Fr
RB	26	Myles Montgomery	Fr
WR	27	Norman Love	So
WR	29	Ashton Koller	So
TE	34	Caleb Schmitz	Fr
RB	36	Lewis Shepherd	Jr
RB	42	Stephan Byrd	Fr
TE	47	Nate Lawler	Sr
OL	50	Dylan O'Quinn	Sr
OL	51	Lorenz Metz	Sr
OL	52	AJ George	Fr
OL	53	Gavin Gerhardt	So
OL	54	Nick Grace	Fr
OL	55	Mao Glynn II	Fr
OL	56	Jake Renfro	Jr
OL	57	Ben Blevins	So
OL	60	Joe Huber	So
OL	61	Luke Dalton	Fr
OL	64	Jake Burns	Jr
OL	66	Landon Fickell	Fr
OL	67	Jaxon Smith	So
OL	69	Cam Jones	Jr
OL	71	Colin Woodside	Sr
OL	72	James Tunstall	Sr
OL	73	CJ Johnson	Sr
OL	74	Jeremy Cooper	Sr
OL	75	John Williams	So
OL	77	Jonathan Harder	Fr
OL	78	Luke Collinsworth	Fr
OL	79	Ethan Green	Fr
WR	80	Chris Scott	So
TE	81	Josh Whyle	Sr
WR	83	Blue Smith	Sr
WR	84	Nick Mardner	Sr
WR	85	Jiair Thomas	Jr
TE	86	Jack Campbell	Jr
TE	87	Joey McBee	Fr
TE	88	Payten Singletary	So

Defense

Pos.	#	Name	Class
LB	0	Ivan Pace Jr.	Sr
LB	2	Wilson Huber	Sr
S	3	Ja'von Hicks	Sr
CB	4	Justin Harris	Sr
S	5	Ja'Quan Sheppard	Sr
CB	6	J.Q. Hardaway	Fr
S	8	Isiah Cox	Fr
CB	9	Arquon Bush	Sr
S	10	Bryon Threats	Fr
CB	11	Sammy Anderson	Jr
CB	12	Todd Bumphis	So
CB	12	Iesa Jarmon	Fr
LB	13	Ty Van Fossen	Sr
CB	14	Patrick Body Jr.	Fr
CB	15	Taj Ward	Sr
LB	16	Cameron Junior	Fr
DL	18	Jowon Briggs	Jr
DL	19	Tyler Gillison	Fr
LB	19	Brody Ingle	Sr
LB	20	Deshawn Pace	Jr
CB	21	Kalen Carroll	Fr
LB	22	Jonathan Thompson	Fr
LB	23	Daved Jones Jr	Jr
LB	24	Jaheim Thomas	So
LB	25	Jack Haglage	Fr
CB	26	Malik Rainey	Fr
S	27	Armorion Smith	Fr
S	29	Jacob Dingle	Sr
DL	30	Rob Jackson	Fr
CB	31	Ken Willis	Fr
S	32	James Camden	So
DL	33	C.J. Doggette	Fr
DL	34	Justin Wodtly	So
S	36	Will Adams	Sr
LB	37	Devin Hightower	Fr
S	39	Cincear Lewis	Fr
LB	40	Leroy Bowers	Fr
DL	42	Malik Vann	Sr
CB	43	Jonah Lytle	Fr
DL	44	Jah-Mal Williams	Fr
DL	45	Barak Faulk	So
CB	47	Oliver Bridges	Fr
LB	49	Jack Dingle	Fr
LB	50	Jackson Bruscianelli	Jr
DL	54	Izaiah Ruffin	Jr
DL	57	Ryan Mullaney	Jr
DL	58	Dontay Corleone	Fr
DL	87	Jalen Monrrow	Fr
DL	89	Sterling Miles	So
DL	90	Jabari Taylor	Sr
DL	92	Derrick Shepard	Fr
DL	94	Chase Brown	Sr
DL	94	Mario Eugenio	Fr
DL	96	Dominique Perry	So
DL	97	Eric Phillips	Jr

Special teams

Pos.	#	Name	Class
P	31	Mason Fletcher	So
P	35	Brady Young	Fr
K	39	Bryce Burton	Jr
LS	85	Triston O'Brien	Fr
K	90	Christian Lowery	So
K	91	Alex Bales	Jr
LS	96	Cayson Pfeiffer	Jr
K	40	Ryan Coe	Sr

Head coach

- Luke Fickell (Ohio State) – 6th year

Coordinators/assistant coaches

- Mike Tressel (Cornell (IA))
  2nd year (5th overall) – (defensive coordinator/linebackers)
- Gino Guidugli (Cincinnati)
  6th year – (offensive coordinator/quarterbacks)
- Kerry Coombs (Dayton)
  1st year (6th overall) – (special teams coordinator/cornerbacks)
- Mike Brown (Liberty)
  4th year – (passing game coordinator/wide receivers)
- Colin Hitschler (Pennsylvania)
  3rd year – (Co-defensive coordinator/safeties)
- Darren Paige (Findlay)
  2nd year – (running backs)
- Mike Cummings (Buffalo)
  1st year – (offensive line)
- Walter Stewart (Cincinnati)
  1st year – (defensive line)
- Nate Letton (Centre)
  1st year – (Tight ends)
- John Ross III (Michigan)
  1st year – (outside linebackers)

Legend

- (C) Team captain
- (S) Suspended
- (I) Ineligible
- Injured
- Redshirt

Roster

== Rankings ==
Ranking movements Legend: ██ Increase in ranking ██ Decrease in ranking — = Not ranked RV = Received votes
	Week															
Poll	Pre	1	2	3	4	5	6	7	8	9	10	11	12	13	14	Final
AP	23	RV	RV	RV	RV	24	21	21	20	RV	RV	22	21	RV	RV	RV
Coaches	22	RV	RV	RV	RV	RV	21	19	19	RV	RV	21	21	RV	RV	RV
CFP	Not released									—	—	25	24	—	—	Not released

== After the season ==
=== Awards and AAC honors ===
Weekly Awards
Player	Award	Date Awarded	Ref.
Mason Fletcher	Special Teams Player of the Week	September 19, 2022	
Ivan Pace Jr.	Defensive Player of the Week	September 26, 2022	
Tyler Scott	Offensive Player of the Week	September 26, 2022	
Mason Fletcher (2)	Special Teams Player of the Week	October 24, 2022	
Ryan Coe	Special Teams Player of the Week	November 21, 2022	

American Athletic Conference Individual Awards
Player	Award	Ref.
Ivan Pace Jr.	AAC Defensive Player of the Year	
Mason Fletcher	AAC Special Teams Player of the Year	

All-AAC
Player	Position	Team
Jowon Briggs	DL	1
Dontay Corleone	DL	1
Mason Fletcher	P	1
Ivan Pace Jr.	LB	1
Ja'Quan Sheppard	CB	1
Josh Whyle	TE	1
Ryan Coe	K	2
Ja'Von Hicks	S	2
Tyler Scott	WR	2
James Tunstall	OT	2
Joe Huber	OT	Hon.
Dylan O’Quinn	OG	Hon.
Reference: * Denotes Unanimous Selection

=== All-Americans ===
NCAA Recognized All-American Honors
Player	AFCA	AP	FWAA	TSN	WCFF	Designation
Ivan Pace Jr.	1st	1st	1st	1st	1st	Consensus
The NCAA recognizes a selection to all five of the AP, AFCA, FWAA, TSN and WCFF first teams for unanimous selections and three of five for consensus selections.

Other All-American Honors
Player	Athletic	Athlon	BR	CBS Sports	CFN	ESPN	FOX Sports	Phil Steele	SI	USA Today
Ivan Pace Jr.	1st		1st	1st		1st	1st	1st		1st
