= 2022 Fenway Bowl =

Postseason college football bowl game

2022 Wasabi Fenway Bowl
- 1st Fenway Bowl
Cincinnati Bearcats	Louisville Cardinals
(9–3)	(7–5)
The American	ACC
7	24
Head coach: Kerry Coombs (interim)	Head coach: Deion Branch (interim)
	1	2	3	4	Total
Cincinnati	0	7	0	0	7
Louisville	7	14	3	0	24
- Date: December 17, 2022
- Season: 2022
- Stadium: Fenway Park
- Location: Boston, Massachusetts
- MVP: Jawhar Jordan (RB, Louisville) & Monty Montgomery (LB, Louisville)
- Favorite: Louisville by 2
- Referee: Jeff Servinski (Big Ten)
- Attendance: 15,000

United States TV coverage
- Network: ESPN
- Announcers: Chris Cotter (play-by-play), Mark Herzlich (analyst), and Kelsey Riggs (sideline)

The 2022 Fenway Bowl was a college football bowl game played on December 17, 2022, at Fenway Park in Boston, Massachusetts. The game was the inaugural edition of the Fenway Bowl and it featured Cincinnati from the American Athletic Conference and Louisville from the Atlantic Coast Conference. The game began at 11:03 a.m. EST and aired on ESPN. It was one of the 2022–23 bowl games concluding the 2022 FBS football season. Sponsored by cloud storage company Wasabi Technologies, it was officially known as the Wasabi Fenway Bowl.

The lead-up to the game was unique in that both schools made coaching changes shortly before, and shortly after, bowl matchups were being determined that involved each other. Immediately following the conclusion of their regular season, Cincinnati head coach Luke Fickell was hired by Wisconsin, leaving the Cincinnati job vacant. On December 2, the Fenway Bowl matchup was announced, and three days later Louisville head coach Scott Satterfield was hired as Cincinnati's next coach, though he recused himself from involvement in the bowl game on the part of either team. Both teams had interim head coaches for the game: cornerbacks coach and special teams coordinator Kerry Coombs for Cincinnati and director of player development Deion Branch for Louisville.

The game started defensively; the first six drives resulted in three punts, two fumbles, and a turnover on downs. Louisville scored the game's first points with less than 30 seconds remaining in the first quarter with a one-play touchdown drive on a rush by Jawhar Jordan, and Cincinnati scored for the first time on their next drive with a pass from Evan Prater to Wyatt Fischer. The Cardinals scored the game's third straight touchdown in response, with a pass from Brock Domann to Marshon Ford, and added another on their next drive with under a minute left. After a fumble and two punts to begin the second half, Louisville added to their lead with a 48-yard field goal; Cincinnati punted on each of their final four drives and Louisville committed three turnovers before kneeling to run out the clock on their final drive to win 24–7.

== Background ==
The 2022 season was the third straight year for which the Fenway Bowl's inaugural edition was scheduled; it was cancelled in both 2020 and 2021. The 2020 edition was cancelled on October 23, 2020, well before the 2020 regular season had concluded, while the 2021 edition was cancelled on December 26, 2021, three days before it was set to be played. The COVID-19 pandemic caused the first cancellation while an outbreak of the Omicron variant within the Virginia program forced the second cancellation as they were unable to play and their scheduled opponent, SMU, was unable to find a replacement.

== Teams ==
The Fenway Bowl featured the Louisville Cardinals from the Atlantic Coast Conference and the Cincinnati Bearcats from the American Athletic Conference. The Bearcats and Cardinals were long-time conference mates, having played together in the Missouri Valley Conference from 1963 to 1969, as independents from 1975 to 1995, in Conference USA from 1996 to 2004, in the Big East Conference from 2005 to 2012, and in the American Athletic Conference in 2013. Both teams played annually for The Keg of Nails trophy until the rivalry went dormant when Louisville joined the ACC in 2014.

On November 27, 2022, Wisconsin announced that it had hired Cincinnati's Luke Fickell to become their new head coach, meaning that Fickell would not coach Cincinnati in the Fenway Bowl. To fill the vacancy, Cincinnati hired Louisville head coach Scott Satterfield to the same position on December 5, three days after Cincinnati and Louisville were announced as bowl opponents. At his introductory press conference, Satterfield said that he would have no part in the bowl game with respect to either team.

Entering the game, Cincinnati led the all-time series 30–22–1. The teams had last met in 2013, when Louisville defeated Cincinnati, 31–24, in overtime.

=== Cincinnati ===
The Bearcats, representing the American Athletic Conference (AAC) and coming off of a College Football Playoff appearance in 2021, began their campaign with a road trip to play No. 19 Arkansas, to whom they lost by a touchdown. Cincinnati earned their first win of the year the following weekend, as they defeated Kennesaw State by 53 points in their home opener. A neutral-site game at Paycor Stadium followed, as the Bearcats defeated rivals Miami (OH), and they returned home to finish September with a 21-point win over Indiana. In their first AAC contest, the Bearcats beat Tulsa by ten, which put them back into the AP Top 25 for the first time since the preseason poll. Cincinnati then defeated South Florida on homecoming before taking a bye week. They earned bowl eligibility following a defeat of SMU on the road, though dropped out of the rankings the next week after losing a four-point contest at UCF. They rebounded quickly with a pair of home conference wins against Navy and East Carolina, before traveling to Philadelphia and beating Temple by twenty points. Cincinnati's regular season concluded with a home loss to No. 19 Tulane, which knocked them out of contention for a third consecutive AAC championship. The Bearcats accepted a bid to the Fenway Bowl on December 2; they entered the game with an overall record of 9–3 and a conference record of 6–2.

This was Cincinnati's final game as a member of the American Athletic Conference, as the Bearcats joined the Big 12 Conference in 2023.

=== Louisville ===
Louisville, representing the Atlantic Coast Conference, began the season with a conference road matchup against Syracuse, resulting in a 24-point loss for the Cardinals. Their first win came the next week as they traveled to Orlando and defeated UCF. Their first two home games of the year, played against Florida State and South Florida, ended in a close loss and a blowout win, respectively, putting the Cardinals at 2–2 after their first month of play. Another pair of road games followed, as Louisville fell to Boston College by a single point before beating Virginia by seventeen, earning their first ACC win before heading into a bye week. Their next contest, a homecoming matchup with Pittsburgh, marked Louisville's first run of consecutive wins on the year, and they added a third in a row the following week by virtue of a 27-point upset of No. 10 Wake Forest. The Cardinals earned bowl eligibility with a win the following Saturday over James Madison, extending their win streak to four. The streak came to an end on the road against No. 10 Clemson, though Louisville was able to rebound the following week by defeating No. 24 NC State in their final home game. Their final regular season game was a Governor's Cup game at Kentucky, a 13-point loss for the Cardinals. They entered the bowl game with an overall record of 7–5 and an ACC mark of 4–4.

In addition to the majority of its full-time coaches, Louisville was without quarterback Malik Cunningham, who opted out and declared for the NFL draft on December 9.

== Game summary ==
The Fenway Bowl was televised by ESPN, with a commentary team of Chris Cotter, Mark Herzlich, and Kelsey Riggs. The game was officiated by a Big Ten Conference crew led by referee Jeff Servinski and umpire Tim Glover. It was played at Fenway Park in Boston, Massachusetts, with weather at kickoff 37 °F (3 °C) and cloudy.

=== First half ===
Bryce Burton's kickoff began the game with a touchback, giving Louisville the ball to start the game at their own 25-yard-line. An incomplete pass by Brock Domann was the first play; Louisville gained three yards on their next two plays and their first series ended with a punt that was downed at the Louisville 42-yard-line. Cincinnati started the game with a first down on their second play on a 10-yard rush by quarterback Evan Prater, but faced 3rd & 26 following a sack by Ashton Gillotte and a resulting fumble that was recovered by the Bearcats at the Louisville 46-yard-line. Cincinnati attempted a fourth down conversion but Prater's pass was incomplete and Louisville took over on downs at their own 36-yard-line. The Cardinals quickly went three-and-out and punted back to the Bearcats after a minute and a half; the kick was downed at the Cincinnati 9-yard-line. A pass from Prater to Blue Smith gained nine, setting up Charles McClelland to gain a first down on the next play with a 2-yard rush. Prater rushed for 12 yards and passed to Payten Singletary for 11 on consecutive plays to reach the Cincinnati 44-yard-line, but the Bearcats stalled from there and punted on 4th & 5 from near midfield. Braden Smith fair caught the punt on his own 11-yard-line, and the Cardinals quickly faced 3rd & 6, which was converted with a 6-yard rush by Domann. The ball was advanced up to the Louisville 36-yard-line after the play for a personal foul called on Cincinnati's Ivan Pace Jr., giving Louisville an automatic first down anyway. A pair of short gains set up another third-and-short situation, but the Cardinals failed to convert as a fumble cut their drive short. Ryan Mullaney recovered the ball for the Bearcats at the Louisville 40-yard-line, but a sack on their first play and a fumble of their own on a second sack two plays later gave possession back to Louisville at the Cincinnati 49-yard-line. The Cardinals were able to take advantage of the miscue and open the scoring with a 49-yard touchdown rush by Jawhar Jordan on their first play, leaving 21 seconds on the clock. A kickoff returned to the Cincinnati 27-yard-line and a 6-yard rush by Ethan Wright ended the first quarter.

Cincinnati began the second quarter facing 2nd & 4 at their own 33-yard-line, and they moved the chains on their next play with a pass from Prater to Wyatt Fischer. A rush for no gain on their next third down set up 4th & 1, which was converted by Wright. A pair of long passes followed, with Prater finding Smith for a 23-yard gain and Fisher on the next play for a 20-yard touchdown, tying the game with Christian Lowery's extra point. The Bearcats' ensuing kickoff was returned to the 34-yard-line, and the Cardinals offense moved the ball into Cincinnati territory in three plays with an 18-yard pass from Domann to Jaelin Carter. Later in the drive, Domann connected with Carter again for a gain of 15 yards, putting Louisville in the red zone, and the Cardinals retook the lead two plays later with an 8-yard pass from Domann to Marshon Ford. A 7-yard rush by Prater to start Cincinnati's next drive was offset by a loss of 5 yards on a sack by Ramon Puryear and Jared Dawson, and they were unable to convert third down and had to punt. Louisville took over at their own 26-yard-line and immediately found success with a 12-yard pass from Domann to Carter and an 11-yard Turner rush to begin. Turner rushed again for 8 yards a couple of plays later, and, despite an 8-yard sack by Ivan Pace Jr. on the ensuing first down, the Cardinals converted 3rd & 13 for a 41-yard touchdown by Jawhar Jordan. Cincinnati took possession at their own 28-yard-line and immediately suffered an 11-yard sack, which ended the first half with Louisville leading, 21–7.

=== Second half ===
Cincinnati opened the third quarter with a pair of rushes by Corey Kiner for 4 and 3 yards, respectively, before turning the ball over on a fumble recovered by Louisville's Yasir Abdullah at the Louisville 48-yard-line. A pair of incompletions on the ensuing series left Louisville unable to capitalize on the turnover, and Mark Vassett punted for 36 yards and left Cincinnati with possession on their own 17-yard-line. A 13-yard-rush by Wright on the drive's second play moved the chains but a sack on their next third down pushed them back to 4th & 20 and forced a punt, which was fair caught at the Louisville 33-yard-line. Jordan carried for three yards to begin the drive and ran for another seven seven to earn a first down, and Turner earned another pair of first downs for the Cardinals within the next few plays. A 7-yard rush by Turner later in the drive kept Louisville going with a third down conversion, though he was unable to convert 3rd & 12 as he was stopped in the backfield for a loss of a yard. That brought up fourth down from the Cincinnati 29-yard-line, and James Turner kicked a 48-yard field goal to increase Louisville's lead to 17 points. A 32-yard return by Drew Donley gave Cincinnati starting field position at their own 35-yard-line, and Wright crossed midfield with an 18-yard rush on the drive' second play. Prater then scrambled for 2 yards but Pauling lost 8 on second down to bring up a third-and-long. Cincinnati was forced to punt when Prater's pass fell incomplete, and Louisville returned the kick to their own 21-yard-line. A pair of runs by Turner for 3 and 6 yards set the Cardinals at 3rd & 1, and Turner rushed for 8 yards to convert it and give them a first down; a fourth consecutive Turner rush, this one for 3 yards, ran out the clock and ended the third quarter.

Louisville started the fourth quarter well, with a 17-yard pass from Domann to Smith to earn a first down. However, on the next play, a pass by Braden Smith was intercepted by Cincinnati's Armorion Smith at the Cincinnati 21-yard-line and returned for 20 yards, giving the Bearcats possession at their own 41-yard-line. They were unable to capitalize, as they failed to gain yardage on the series that resulted and punted after a three-and-out, and Louisville took over again on their own 20-yard-line. The Cardinals flipped the field early as Turner rushed for 48 yards on second down, advancing the Louisville offense to the Cincinnati 32-yard-line, but three plays later Domann's pass was picked off by Ja'von Hicks and returned to the Cincinnati 24-yard-line. Again, Cincinnati found themselves unable to turn the interception into points; a sack for a loss of 8 yards by YaYa Diaby on third down forced another Bearcats punt, fair caught at the Louisville 38-yard-line. A series of short gains set up 4th & 2 for the Cardinals, which they attempted and converted with a 3-yard rush; they gained 24 yards on the next play with a Domann-to-Smith pass that reached the Cincinnati 27-yard-line. An 11-yard pass to Chris Bell two plays later put them in the red zone, but a fumble on 1st & Goal from the Cincinnati 5-yard-line ended the drive and gave the Bearcats the ball back. Three rushes by Myles Montgomery followed, gaining 8 yards in total, before a false start penalty set them back 5 yards and forced Cincinnati's final punt of the game. Louisville took over for the last time on their own 46-yard-line and gained two first downs in their first three plays, after which they were able to run out the clock and end the game, capping off a 24–7 Fenway Bowl win.

=== Scoring summary ===
2022 Wasabi Fenway Bowl

Quarter	1	2	3	4	Total
Cincinnati	0	7	0	0	7
Louisville	7	14	3	0	24

at Fenway Park • Boston, Massachusetts

- Date: Saturday, December 17, 2022
- Game time: 11:00 a.m. EST
- Game weather: Cloudy • Temperature: 37 °F (3 °C)
- Game attendance: 15,000
- Referee: Jeff Servinski
- TV announcers (ESPN): Chris Cotter (play-by-play), Mark Herzlich (analyst), and Kelsey Riggs (sideline)
- Box score

Scoring summary

Quarter	Time	Drive			Team	Scoring information	Score	
Quarter	Time	Plays	Yards	TOP	Team	Scoring information	Cincinnati	Louisville
1	0:21	1	49	0:08	Louisville	Jawhar Jordan 49-yard touchdown run, James Turner kick good	0	7
2	10:58	9	73	4:23	Cincinnati	Wyatt Fischer 20-yard touchdown reception from Evan Prater, Christian Lowery kick good	7	7
2	5:52	10	66	5:06	Louisville	Marshon Ford 8-yard touchdown reception from Brock Domann, James Turner kick good	7	14
2	0:42	7	74	2:47	Louisville	Jawhar Jordan 41-yard touchdown run, James Turner kick good	7	21
3	3:49	14	38	6:21	Louisville	48-yard field goal by James Turner	7	24
"TOP" = time of possession. For other American football terms, see Glossary of American football.							7	24

== Statistics ==
Team statistical comparison
Statistic	Cincinnati	Louisville
First downs	10	24
First downs rushing	7	15
First downs passing	4	7
First downs penalty	0	2
Third down efficiency	2–13	7–14
Fourth down efficiency	1–2	1–1
Total plays–net yards	53–138	72–419
Rushing attempts–net yards	38–44	49–287
Yards per rush	1.2	5.9
Yards passing	83	132
Pass completions–attempts	7–15	13–23
Interceptions thrown	0	2
Punt returns–total yards	0–0	3–10
Kickoff returns–total yards	5–119	1–18
Punts–average yardage	7–42.3	3–35.3
Fumbles–lost	3–2	2–2
Penalties–yards	3–25	5–25
Time of possession	27:31	32:29

Cincinnati statistics
Bearcats passing
	C–A	Yds	TD–INT
Evan Prater	7–15	83	1–0
Bearcats rushing
	Car	Yds	TD
Ethan Wright	8	43	0
Charles McClelland	6	15	0
Corey Kiner	5	11	0
Myles Montgomery	4	8	0
Brady Lichtenberg	1	5	0
Will Pauling	1	−8	0
Evan Prater	13	−30	0
Bearcats receiving
	Rec	Yds	TD
Blue Smith	2	32	0
Wyatt Fischer	2	31	1
Payten Singletary	1	11	0
Will Pauling	1	10	0
Charles McClelland	1	−1	0

Louisville statistics
Cardinals passing
	C–A	Yds	TD–INT
Brock Domann	13–21	132	1–1
Braden Smith	0–2	0	0–1
Cardinals rushing
	Car	Yds	TD
Maurice Turner	31	160	0
Jawhar Jordan	9	115	2
Braden Smith	1	6	0
Grant Goodman	2	5	0
Ahmari Huggins-Bruce	1	1	0
Brock Domann	5	0	0
Jeremiah Caldwell	1	0	0
Cardinals receiving
	Rec	Yds	TD
Jaelin Carter	4	50	0
Braden Smith	3	45	0
Marshon Ford	2	13	1
Chris Bell	1	11	0
Jawhar Jordan	2	11	0
Ahmari Huggins-Bruce	1	2	0
