= Kerry Coombs =

American football player and coach (born 1961)

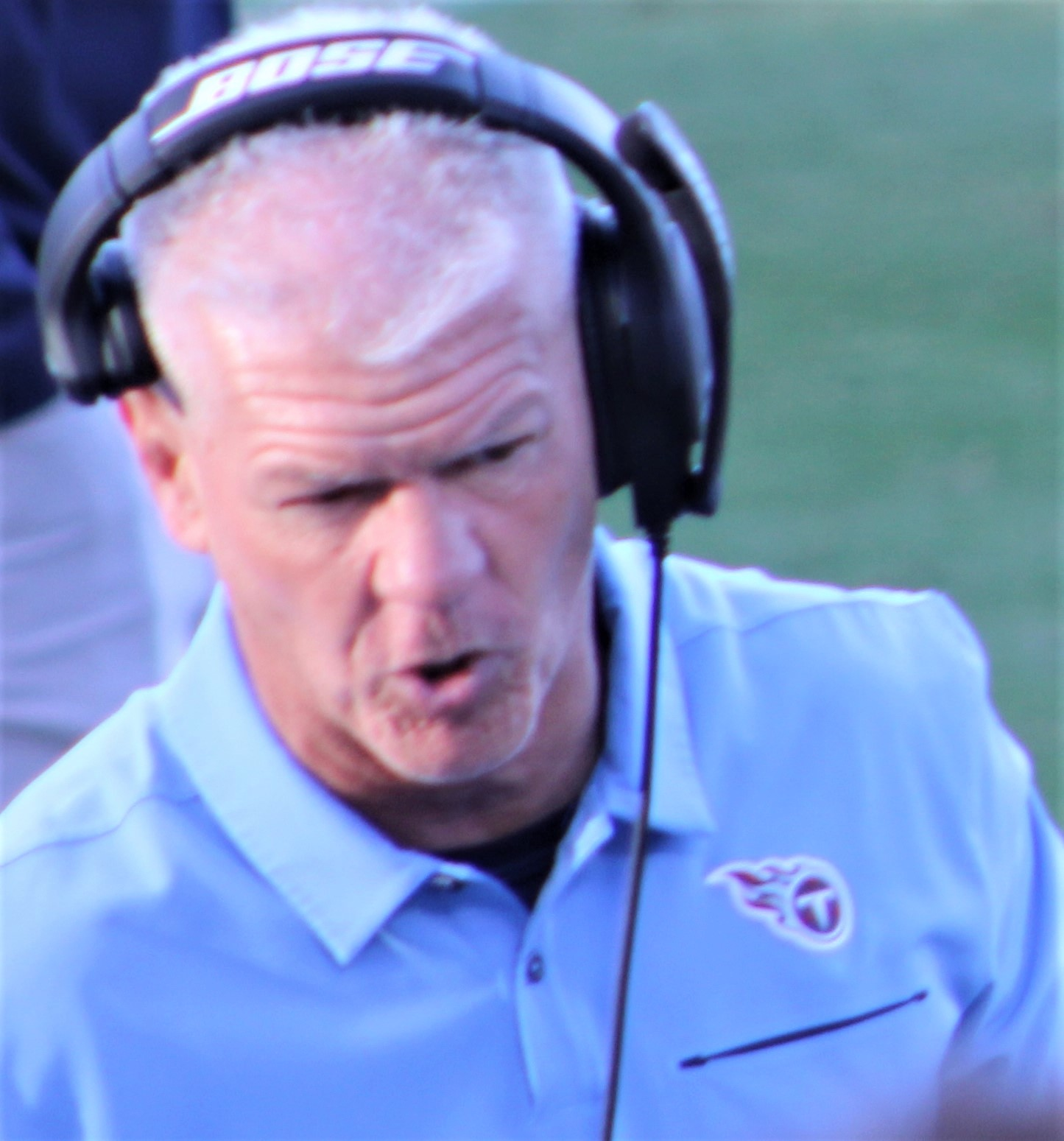
- Coombs with the Tennessee Titans in 2019

Current position
- Title: Special teams coordinator
- Team: Michigan
- Conference: Big Ten

Biographical details
- Born: September 9, 1961 (age 65); Colerain, Ohio, U.S.

Playing career
- 1981–1982: Dayton

Coaching career (HC unless noted)
- 1983–1984: Greenhills HS (OH) (assistant)
- 1985–1988: Lakota HS (OH) (assistant)
- 1989–1990: Loveland HS (OH)
- 1991–2006: Colerain HS (OH)
- 2007–2008: Cincinnati (DB)
- 2009–2011: Cincinnati (AHC/STC/DB)
- 2012: Ohio State (CB)
- 2013–2017: Ohio State (STC/CB)
- 2018–2019: Tennessee Titans (DB)
- 2020–2021: Ohio State (DC)
- 2022: Cincinnati (interim HC/STC/CB)
- 2023–2024: Cincinnati (STC/CB)
- 2025–present: Michigan (STC)

Head coaching record
- Overall: 161–34 (high school); 0–1 (college)
- Bowls: 0–1

Kerry Coombs (born September 9, 1961) is an American football coach, currently the special teams coordinator at the University of Michigan. Previously, Coombs was an assistant coach for the Tennessee Titans of the National Football League (NFL) in 2018 and 2019, the defensive coordinator for Ohio State from 2020 to 2021, and the special teams coordinator for Cincinnati from 2022 to 2024.

== Coaching career ==
=== High school (1983–2006) ===
Coombs was a member of the University of Dayton's 1980 Division III National Championship team while studying secondary education. After graduation, he became an assistant coach at two Cincinnati area high schools. In 1989, he accepted the position of head coach at Loveland High School in Loveland, Ohio.

Two years later, he accepted the position of head coach at Colerain High School in Cincinnati, the high school from which he graduated in 1979. In 16 seasons under his leadership, the Colerain Cardinals football team went to ten state playoffs, including five state semifinal berths. In 2004, his team went undefeated (15–0) and won the Division I state championship. During his reign, Colerain won seven consecutive Greater Miami Conference championships from 2000 to 2006. Coombs had a 161–34 record as head coach.

=== First college stint (2007–2017) ===
In 2007, Coombs accepted the offer from Brian Kelly to join his staff at the University of Cincinnati as the team's defensive backs coach. The Bearcats led the nation with 26 interceptions in 2007. In 2009, Coombs was promoted to associate head coach in addition to his responsibilities as the team's defensive backs coach and special teams coordinator.

In 2012, Coombs accepted a position to become the defensive backs coach at Ohio State University. In 2016, the Buckeyes ranked fourth nationally with 21 interceptions, including a nation-high seven interceptions returned for touchdowns, and the team ranked third in the country in passing efficiency defense. In 2017, Ohio State head coach, Urban Meyer, promoted Coombs to the position of assistant coordinator, defense. That year, the Ohio State defense ranked ninth in the NCAA in yards allowed.

=== Tennessee Titans (2018–2019) ===
In 2018, Coombs accepted a position to join coach Mike Vrabel's staff with the Tennessee Titans of the National Football League (NFL) as a secondary (defensive backs) coach. For the first time in his career, Coombs coached a team in a state other than Ohio. It was also the first time since 1989 that Coombs coached a team that did not have red as the team's primary color. The 2018 Titans ranked sixth in the NFL in passing defense (216.9 yards per game), ranked eighth in the league with an opponent passer rating of 88.4, and finished ninth in the league with a 63.2 opponent completion percentage. Titans defensive backs accounted for 10 total interceptions and an NFL-high nine sacks. In 2019, the Titans defensive back was again a top-10 unit in passing yards and interceptions. The Titans made the playoffs, but lost in the AFC Championship game.

=== Return to Ohio State (2020–2021) ===
In 2020, Ohio State needed to fill the position of defensive coordinator and secondary coach following the retirement of Greg Mattison. The search committee quickly set its sights on Coombs. Coombs was highly regarded by the Ohio State coaching staff, administration and fans. Thus, after two successful years in the NFL, Coombs announced his return to Ohio State on January 20, 2020.

Coombs' first year as the defensive coordinator for the Buckeyes was a mixed bag, as the team finished near the top in terms of run defense, but near the bottom in terms of pass defense. The Buckeyes allowed 97.6 rushing yards per game and 3.4 yards per rush, ranking sixth and fifteenth in the FBS, respectively. In terms of pass defense, Ohio State allowed 303.6 yards per game and 7.7 yards per pass attempt, ranking one hundred twenty-second and eighty-second in the FBS, respectively.

Following the 2020 season and the retirement of co-defensive coordinator Greg Mattison, Coombs assumed the role as the sole defensive coordinator, while Matt Barnes succeeded Coombs as secondary coach.

Ohio State's defensive struggles from 2020 continued into the beginning of the 2021 season. The Buckeyes allowed over 400 yards of offense in a week 1 victory against Minnesota, and over 500 yards of offense in a week 2 loss against Oregon. Following Ohio State's week 3 victory over Tulsa, a game where the Buckeyes again allowed over 500 total yards of offense, head coach Ryan Day announced that secondary coach Matt Barnes had called the defensive plays that week, rather than Coombs. Day also indicated that Barnes calling the defensive plays would be a permanent move. This ultimately led to Coombs and Ohio State agree to part ways after the season ended.

=== Return to Cincinnati (2022–2024) ===
On January 13, 2022, it was reported that Coombs would not be retained by Ohio State. On January 18, 2022, it was reported that Coombs was returning to the University of Cincinnati as cornerbacks coach and special teams coordinator. He joined the staff of head coach Luke Fickell, under whom he had previously worked while Fickell was the co-defensive coordinator at Ohio State from 2012 to 2016.

On November 27, 2022, following the announcement of Fickell's hire by Wisconsin, Coombs was promoted to interim head coach for the remainder of the Bearcats' season. On December 5, 2022, it was announced that Scott Satterfield would be taking over at Cincinnati.

=== University of Michigan (2025–present) ===
On December 6, 2025, it was announced that Coombs would be the special teams coordinator at the University of Michigan. He was hired by Sherrone Moore, who was fired four days later. Despite this, and because he had not coached in 2025 for another NCAA program, he was eligible and coached in the 2025 Citrus Bowl.

== Head coaching record ==
Year	Team	Overall	Conference	Standing	Bowl/playoffs	Coaches^{#}	AP^{°}
Cincinnati Bearcats (American Athletic Conference) (2022)
2022	Cincinnati	0–1	0–0		L Fenway		
Cincinnati:		0–1	0–0				
Total:		0–1					

== Family life ==
Coombs and his wife, Holly, have three children: daughter Cortney and sons Brayden and Dylan. In 2020, the Detroit Lions hired Brayden as their special teams coordinator.
