= Tyler Scott (American football) =

American football player (born 2001)

No. 82 – Los Angeles Rams
- Position: Wide receiver
- Roster status: Practice squad

Personal information
- Born: October 12, 2001 (age 25); Akron, Ohio, U.S.
- Listed height: 5 ft 11 in (1.80 m)
- Listed weight: 185 lb (84 kg)

Career information
- High school: Norton (Norton, Ohio)
- College: Cincinnati (2020–2022)
- NFL draft: 2023: 4th round, 133rd overall pick

Career history
- Chicago Bears (2023–2024); Indianapolis Colts (2025)*; Seattle Seahawks (2025)*; Los Angeles Rams (2025)*; Las Vegas Raiders (2026)*; Los Angeles Rams (2026–present)*
- * Offseason or practice squad member only

Awards and highlights
- Second-team All-AAC (2022)

Career NFL statistics as of 2026
- Receptions: 18
- Receiving yards: 173
- Receiving average: 9.6
- Rushing yards: 41
- Rushing average: 5.9
- Stats at Pro Football Reference

Tyler Scott (born October 12, 2001) is an American professional football wide receiver for the Los Angeles Rams of the National Football League (NFL). Originally drafted by the Chicago Bears, he played college football for the Cincinnati Bearcats.

== Early life ==
Scott was born on October 12, 2001, in Akron, Ohio. He grew up in Norton, Ohio, and he attended Norton High School, where he played basketball and football and was a sprinter on the track team. He played running back for Norton and rushed 243 times for 1,512 yards and scored 27 total touchdowns in his junior season. Scott rushed for 1,337 yards and 21 touchdowns as a senior. He was rated a three-star recruit and committed to play college football at the University of Cincinnati over numerous Power Five offers.

== College career ==
Scott played in ten games during his freshman season at Cincinnati and caught three passes for 20 yards and rushed one time for 20 yards. He became a starter as a sophomore and finished the season with 30 receptions for 520 yards and five touchdowns. Scott was named second team All-American Athletic Conference as a junior after catching 54 passes for 899 yards and nine touchdowns. At the end of the season, he opted out of the 2022 Fenway Bowl in order to prepare for the 2023 NFL draft.

=== Statistics ===
| Year | Team | Games | | Receiving | | | | Rushing | | | |
| Year | Team | GP | GS | Rec | Yds | Avg | TD | Att | Yds | Avg | TD |
|---|---|---|---|---|---|---|---|---|---|---|---|
| 2020 | Cincinnati | 10 | 0 | 3 | 20 | 6.7 | 0 | 1 | 20 | 20.0 | 0 |
| 2021 | Cincinnati | 14 | 8 | 30 | 520 | 17.3 | 5 | 0 | 0 | 0.0 | 0 |
| 2022 | Cincinnati | 11 | 11 | 54 | 899 | 16.6 | 9 | 0 | 0 | 0.0 | 0 |
| Career | | 35 | 21 | 87 | 1,439 | 16.5 | 14 | 1 | 20 | 20.0 | 0 |

== Professional career ==
Pre-draft measurables
| Height | Weight | Arm length | Hand span | Wingspan | 40-yard dash | 10-yard split | 20-yard split | 20-yard shuttle | Three-cone drill | Vertical jump | Broad jump | Bench press |
|---|---|---|---|---|---|---|---|---|---|---|---|---|
| 5 ft 9 7/8 in (1.77 m) | 177 lb (80 kg) | 30 7/8 in (0.78 m) | 9 in (0.23 m) | 6 ft 0 3/4 in (1.85 m) | 4.39 s | 1.62 s | 2.47 s | 4.25 s | 6.99 s | 39.5 in (1.00 m) | 11 ft 1 in (3.38 m) | 15 reps |
All values from NFL Combine/Pro Day

=== Chicago Bears ===
Scott was selected by the Chicago Bears in the fourth round (133rd overall) in the 2023 NFL Draft, which they originally acquired from the Philadelphia Eagles for Robert Quinn. As a rookie, he appeared in 17 games and started four. He finished with 17 receptions for 168 yards. In 2024, Scott appeared in 11 games, but had only one reception for five yards during the season.

On August 26, 2025, Scott was waived by the Bears as part of final roster cuts.

=== Indianapolis Colts ===
On August 28, 2025, Scott signed with the Indianapolis Colts' practice squad. He was released by Indianapolis on September 23.

=== Seattle Seahawks ===
On October 15, 2025, Scott signed with the Seattle Seahawks' practice squad. He was released on October 24.

=== Los Angeles Rams (first stint) ===
On October 28, 2025, Scott signed with the Los Angeles Rams' practice squad. On January 27, 2026, he signed a reserve/futures contract with Los Angeles. On August 30, Scott was waived by the Rams as a part of final roster cuts.

=== Las Vegas Raiders ===
On September 28, 2026, Scott signed with the Las Vegas Raiders practice squad. He was released on October 21.

=== Los Angeles Rams (second stint) ===
On November 12, 2026, Scott signed with the Los Angeles Rams practice squad.
