= 2022 Navy Midshipmen football team =

American college football season

2022 Navy Midshipmen football
- Conference: American Athletic Conference
- Record: 4–8 (4–4 AAC)
- Head coach: Ken Niumatalolo (15th season)
- Offensive scheme: Triple option
- Defensive coordinator: Brian Newberry (4th season)
- Base defense: 4–2–5
- Home stadium: Navy–Marine Corps Memorial Stadium

2022 American Athletic Conference football standings
| | Conf. | | | Overall |
| Team | W | | L | W | | L |
|---|---|---|---|---|---|---|
| No. 9 Tulane y$ | 7 | – | 1 | 12 | – | 2 |
| UCF y | 6 | – | 2 | 9 | – | 5 |
| Cincinnati | 6 | – | 2 | 9 | – | 4 |
| SMU | 5 | – | 3 | 7 | – | 6 |
| Houston | 5 | – | 3 | 8 | – | 5 |
| East Carolina | 4 | – | 4 | 8 | – | 5 |
| Navy | 4 | – | 4 | 4 | – | 8 |
| Memphis | 3 | – | 5 | 7 | – | 6 |
| Tulsa | 3 | – | 5 | 5 | – | 7 |
| Temple | 1 | – | 7 | 3 | – | 9 |
| South Florida | 0 | – | 8 | 1 | – | 11 |
Championship: Tulane 45, UCF 28
$ – Conference champion; y – Championship game participant; Rankings from AP Poll

The 2022 Navy Midshipmen football team represented the United States Naval Academy in the 2022 NCAA Division I FBS football season. The Midshipmen played their home games at Navy–Marine Corps Memorial Stadium in Annapolis, Maryland, as members of the American Athletic Conference (The American). They were led by fifteen-year head coach Ken Niumatalolo. They finished the season 4–8, 4–4 in AAC play to finish in a tie for seventh place.

On December 11, 2022, the Midshipmen fired head coach Ken Niumatalolo. On December 19, 2022, the school promoted Brian Newberry to be their next head coach. He had previously been the team's defensive coordinator.

== Schedule ==
Navy and The American announced the 2022 football schedule on February 17, 2022.

| Date | Time | Opponent | Site | TV | Result | Attendance |
|---|---|---|---|---|---|---|
| September 3 | 12:00 p.m. | No. 19 (FCS) Delaware* | Navy–Marine Corps Memorial Stadium; Annapolis, MD | CBSSN | L 7–14 | 30,542 |
| September 10 | 3:30 p.m. | Memphis | Navy–Marine Corps Memorial Stadium; Annapolis, MD | CBSSN | L 13–37 | 30,082 |
| September 24 | 6:00 p.m. | at East Carolina | Dowdy–Ficklen Stadium; Greenville, NC | ESPN+ | W 23–20 ^{2OT} | 39,227 |
| October 1 | 12:00 p.m. | at Air Force* | Falcon Stadium; Colorado Springs, CO (Commander-in-Chief's Trophy) | CBS | L 10–13 | 36,947 |
| October 8 | 3:30 p.m. | Tulsa | Navy–Marine Corps Memorial Stadium; Annapolis, MD | CBSSN | W 53–21 | 30,658 |
| October 14 | 7:30 p.m. | at SMU | Gerald J. Ford Stadium; University Park, TX (Gansz Trophy) | ESPN | L 34–40 | 24,583 |
| October 22 | 12:00 p.m. | Houston | Navy–Marine Corps Memorial Stadium; Annapolis, MD | ESPNU | L 20–38 | 32,443 |
| October 29 | 3:30 p.m. | Temple^{†} | Navy–Marine Corps Memorial Stadium; Annapolis, MD | CBSSN | W 27–20 ^{OT} | 31,141 |
| November 5 | 4:00 p.m. | at Cincinnati | Nippert Stadium; Cincinnati, OH | ESPNU | L 10–20 | 38,461 |
| November 12 | 12:00 p.m. | vs. No. 20 Notre Dame* | M&T Bank Stadium; Baltimore, MD (rivalry) | ABC | L 32–35 | 62,124 |
| November 19 | 11:00 a.m. | at No. 20 UCF | FBC Mortgage Stadium; Orlando, FL | ESPN2 | W 17–14 | 44,813 |
| December 10 | 3:00 p.m. | vs. Army* | Lincoln Financial Field; Philadelphia, PA (Army–Navy Game) | CBS | L 17–20 ^{2OT} | 69,117 |
*Non-conference game; ^{†}Homecoming; Rankings from AP Poll (and CFP Rankings, after November 1) - Released prior to game; All times are in Eastern time

== Game summaries ==
=== No. 19 (FCS) Delaware ===
Delaware at Navy

| Team | 1 | 2 | 3 | 4 | Total |
|---|---|---|---|---|---|
| • No. 19 Fightin' Blue Hens | 7 | 0 | 7 | 0 | 14 |
| Midshipmen | 0 | 0 | 7 | 0 | 7 |

- Date: September 3, 2022
- Location: Navy–Marine Corps Memorial Stadium
  Annapolis, MD
- Game start: 12:03 p.m.
- Elapsed time: 3 hours, 21 minutes
- Game attendance: 30,542
- Game weather: 82 °F (28 °C) • Weather: Sunny • Wind: SE 6 MPH
- Referee: Kevin Randall
- TV announcers (CBSSN): Chick Hernandez (play-by-play), Randy Cross (analyst), & Sheehan Stanwick Burch (sideline)

Scoring summary
1 | 14:38 | DEL | Bryce De Mille 6–yard pass from Nolan Henderson (Brandon Radcliffe kick) (1 play, 21 yards, 0:10) | DEL 7–0
2 | No scoring plays this quarter
3 | 4:30 | DEL | Chandler Harvin 51–yard pass from Noah Henderson (Brandon Radcliffe kick) (5 plays, 78 yards, 3:12) | DEL 14–0
0:29 | NAVY | Tai Lavatai 2–yard run (Evan Warren kick) (10 plays, 56 yards, 3:55) | DEL 14–7
4 | No scoring plays this quarter

| Statistics | Delaware | Navy |
|---|---|---|
| First downs | 13 | 17 |
| Plays–yards | 61 | 76 |
| Rushes–yards | 3 | 184 |
| Passing yards | 189 | 135 |
| Passing: comp–att–int | 20–32–0 | 5–13–0 |
| Time of possession | 27:41 | 32:19 |

| Team | Category | Player | Statistics |
|---|---|---|---|
| Delaware | Passing | Nolan Henderson | 20–32–0, 189 yards, 2 TD |
| Delaware | Rushing | Quincy Watson | 6 carries, 15 yards |
| Delaware | Receiving | Chandler Harvin | 3 receptions, 69 yards, TD |
| Navy | Passing | Tai Lavatai | 5–13–0, 135 yards, TD |
| Navy | Rushing | Daba Fofana | 15 carries, 48 yards |
| Navy | Receiving | Maquel Haywood | 2 receptions, 77 yards |

=== Memphis ===
Memphis Tigers at Navy Midshipmen

| Team | 1 | 2 | 3 | 4 | Total |
|---|---|---|---|---|---|
| • Tigers | 10 | 3 | 10 | 14 | 37 |
| Midshipmen | 7 | 0 | 0 | 6 | 13 |

- Date: September 10, 2022
- Location: Navy–Marine Corps Memorial Stadium
  Annapolis, MD
- Game start: 3:37 p.m.
- Elapsed time: 3 hours, 11 minutes
- Game attendance: 30,082
- Game weather: 78 °F (26 °C) • Weather: Sunny • Wind: SE 7 MPH
- Referee: Hank Jones
- TV announcers (CBSSN): Chick Hernandez (play-by-play), Randy Cross (analyst), & Sheehan Stanwick Burch (sideline)

Scoring summary
| 1 | 12:27 | MEM | Caden Prieskorn 4–yard pass from Seth Henigan (Chris Howard kick) (6 plays, 66 yards, 2:33) | MEM 7–0 |
| 1 | 2:33 | MEM | Chris Howard 37-yard field goal (7 plays, 46 yards, 2:19) | MEM 10–0 |
| 1 | 0:44 | NAVY | Anton Hall Jr. 62–yard pass from Tai Lavatai (Evan Warren kick) (4 plays, 75 yards, 1:49) | MEM 10–7 |
| 2 | 0:00 | MEM | Chris Howard 38-yard field goal (14 plays, 54 yards, 1:44) | MEM 13–7 |
| 3 | 11:56 | MEM | Joseph Scates 79–yard pass from Seth Henigan (Chris Howard kick) (1 play, 79 yards, 0:11) | MEM 20–7 |
| 3 | 8:29 | MEM | Chris Howard 22–yard field goal (7 plays, 35 yards, 3:17) | MEM 23–7 |
| 4 | 12:06 | NAVY | Tai Lavatai 1-yard run (Two-point pass conversion failed) (21 plays, 74 yards, 11:23) | MEM 23–13 |
| 4 | 6:05 | MEM | Brandon Thomas 6–yard run (Chris Howard kick) (13 plays, 88 yards, 6:01) | MEM 30–13 |
| 4 | 3:49 | MEM | Asa Martin 2–yard run (Chris Howard kick) (7 play, 35 yards, 3:17) | MEM 37–13 |

| Statistics | Memphis | Navy |
|---|---|---|
| First downs | 18 | 17 |
| Plays–yards | 506 | 314 |
| Rushes–yards | 91 | 215 |
| Passing yards | 415 | 99 |
| Passing: comp–att–int | 24–35–0 | 3–11–2 |
| Time of possession | 27:26 | 32:34 |

| Team | Category | Player | Statistics |
|---|---|---|---|
| Memphis | Passing | Seth Henigan | 24–34–0, 415 yards, 2 TD |
| Memphis | Rushing | Asa Martin | 5 carries, 56 yards, TD |
| Memphis | Receiving | Gabriel Rogers | 5 receptions, 95 yards |
| Navy | Passing | Tai Lavatai | 3–11–2, 99 yards, TD |
| Navy | Rushing | Maquel Heywood | 8 carries, 54 yards |
| Navy | Receiving | Aton Hall | 1 reception, 62 yards, TD |

=== At East Carolina ===
Navy Midshipmen at East Carolina

| Team | 1 | 2 | 3 | 4 | OT | 2OT | Total |
|---|---|---|---|---|---|---|---|
| • Midshipmen | 0 | 3 | 0 | 14 | 3 | 3 | 23 |
| Pirates | 3 | 0 | 0 | 14 | 3 | 0 | 20 |

- Date: September 24, 2022
- Location: Dowdy-Ficklen Stadium
  Greenville, NC
- Game start: 6:02 p.m.
- Elapsed time: 4 hours, 08 minutes
- Game attendance: 39,227
- Game weather: 75 °F (24 °C) • Weather: Sunny • Wind: W 6 MPH
- Referee: Tim Rich
- TV announcers (ESPN+): Richard Cross (play-by-play) and Jay Sonnhalter (analyst)

Scoring summary
| 1 | 0:48 | ECU | Owen Daffer 19–yard field goal (15 plays, 96 yards, 6:22) | ECU 3–0 |
| 2 | 0:08 | NAVY | Daniel Davies 37–yard field goal (11 plays, 59 yards, 3:51) | TIE 3–3 |
| 3 | | | No scoring plays this quarter. |
| 4 | 13:18 | ECU | Ryan Jones 14-yard pass from Holton Ahlers (Owen Daffer kick) (8 plays, 70 yards, 4:10) | ECU 10–3 |
| 4 | 11:56 | NAVY | Vincent Terrell Jr. 65–yard pass from Tai Lavatai (Daniel Davies kick) (4 plays, 75 yards, 1:22) | Tie 10–10 |
| 4 | 9:15 | NAVY | Anton Hall 7–yard run (Daniel Davies kick) (5 plays, 25 yards, 2:35) | NAVY 17–10 |
| 4 | 8:00 | ECU | Isaiah Winstead 67-yard pass from Holton Ahlers (Owen Daffer kick) (3 plays, 75 yards, 1:15) | TIE 17–17 |
| OT | 0:00 | ECU | Owen Daffer 26–yard field goal (7 plays, 16 yards, 0:00) | ECU 20–17 |
| OT | 0:00 | NAVY | Daniel Davies 29–yard field goal (10 plays, 62 yards, 0:00) | TIE 20–20 |
| 2OT | 0:00 | NAVY | Daniel Davies 29-yard field goal (10 plays, 75 yards, 0:00) | NAVY 23–20 |

| Statistics | Navy | East Carolina |
|---|---|---|
| First downs | 22 | 16 |
| Plays–yards | 393 | 370 |
| Rushes–yards | 241 | 103 |
| Passing yards | 152 | 267 |
| Passing: comp–att–int | 7–11–0 | 22–34–1 |
| Time of possession | 37:02 | 22:58 |

| Team | Category | Player | Statistics |
|---|---|---|---|
| Navy | Passing | Tai Lavatai | 7–10, 152 yards, TD |
| Navy | Rushing | Daba Fofana | 15 carries, 94 yards |
| Navy | Receiving | Vincent Terrell Jr. | 3 receptions, 114 yards, TD |
| East Carolina | Passing | Holton Ahlers | 22–34–1, 267 yards, 2 TD, INT |
| East Carolina | Rushing | Rahjai Harris | 15 carries, 75 yards |
| East Carolina | Receiving | Isaiah Winstead | 11 receptions, 143 yards, TD |

=== At Air Force ===
Navy Midshipmen at Air Force Falcons

| Team | 1 | 2 | 3 | 4 | Total |
|---|---|---|---|---|---|
| Midshipmen | 0 | 3 | 0 | 7 | 10 |
| • Falcons | 10 | 0 | 0 | 3 | 13 |

- Date: October 1, 2022
- Location: Falcon Stadium
  Colorado Springs, CO
- Game start: 12:07 p.m.
- Elapsed time: 3 hours, 7 minutes
- Game attendance: 36,947
- Game weather: Sunny
- Referee: Nate Black
- TV announcers (CBS): Rich Waltz (play-by-play), Aaron Taylor (analyst), & Sherree Burruss (sideline)

Scoring summary
| 1 | 13:36 | AF | David Cormier 67–yard pass from Haaziq Daniels (Matthew Dapore kick) (3 plays, 75 yards, 1:24) | AF 7–0 |
| 1 | 4:17 | AF | Matthew Dapore 23-yard field goal (9 plays, 52 yards, 5:25) | AF 10–0 |
| 2 | 0:00 | NAVY | Daniel Davies 37–yard field goal (4 plays, 11 yards, 0:34) | AF 10–3 |
| 3 | | | No scoring plays this quarter. |
| 4 | 10:50 | NAVY | Tai Lavatai 5-yard run (Daniel Davies kick) (10 plays, 59 yards, 4:20) | TIE 10–10 |
| 4 | 4:14 | AF | Matthew Dapore 22–yard field goal (12 plays, 71 yards, 6:36) | AF 13–10 |

| Statistics | Navy | Air Force |
|---|---|---|
| First downs | 13 | 16 |
| Plays–yards | 56–243 | 55–356 |
| Rushes–yards | 36–114 | 47–200 |
| Passing yards | 129 | 156 |
| Passing: comp–att–int | 11–20–0 | 6–8–0 |
| Time of possession | 27:41 | 32:19 |

| Team | Category | Player | Statistics |
|---|---|---|---|
| Navy | Passing | Tai Lavatai | 11–20, 129 yards |
| Navy | Rushing | Tai Lavatai | 12 carries, 34 yards, 1 TD |
| Navy | Receiving | Jayden Umbarger | 4 receptions, 71 yards |
| Air Force | Passing | Haaziq Daniels | 6–8, 156 yards, 1 TD |
| Air Force | Rushing | Brad Roberts | 23 carries, 108 yards |
| Air Force | Receiving | David Cormier | 3 receptions 120 yards, 1 TD |

=== Tulsa ===
Tulsa Golden Hurricane at Navy Midshipmen

| Team | 1 | 2 | 3 | 4 | Total |
|---|---|---|---|---|---|
| Golden Hurricane | 7 | 7 | 0 | 7 | 21 |
| • Midshipmen | 10 | 26 | 10 | 7 | 53 |

- Date: October 8, 2022
- Location: Navy–Marine Corps Memorial Stadium
  Annapolis, MD
- Game start: 3:37 p.m.
- Elapsed time: 3 hours, 29 minutes
- Game attendance: 30,658
- Game weather: 58 °F (14 °C) • Weather: Clear • Wind: NW 10 MPH
- Referee: Kevin Randell
- TV announcers (CBSSN): John Sadak (play-by-play), Randy Cross (analyst), & Sheehan Stanwick Burch (sideline)

Scoring summary
| 1 | 5:10 | NAVY | Daniel Davies 25–yard field goal (7 plays, 57 yards, 3:35) | NAVY 3–0 |
| 1 | 2:25 | NAVY | Nathan Kent 70–yard run (Daniel Davies kick) (1 play, 85 yards, 0:20) | NAVY 10–0 |
| 1 | 0:43 | TULSA | Malachai Jones 22–yard pass from Davis Brin (Zack Long kick) (5 plays, 75 yards, 1:42) | NAVY 10–7 |
| 2 | 13:41 | NAVY | Daba Fofana 47–yard run (Daniel Davies kick) (4 plays, 72 yards, 2:02) | NAVY 17–7 |
| 2 | 10:57 | NAVY | Daba Fofana 15–yard run (Daniel Davies kick) (3 plays, 22 yards, 1:18) | NAVY 24–7 |
| 2 | 10:07 | NAVY | Team Safety (3 plays, -5 yards, 0:50) | NAVY 26–7 |
| 2 | 3:57 | NAVY | Daba Fofana 11–yard run (Daniel Davies kick) (7 plays, 34 yards, 3:19) | NAVY 33–7 |
| 2 | 3:21 | TULSA | Keylon Stokes 76-yard pass from Davis Brin (Zack Long kick) (2 plays, 75 yards, 0:36) | NAVY 33–14 |
| 2 | 0:11 | NAVY | Daniel Davies 46–yard field goal (14 plays, 46 yards, 3:10) | NAVY 36–14 |
| 3 | 10:06 | NAVY | Tai Lavatai 26-yard pass from Kai Puail-Rojas (Daniel Davies kick) (9 plays, 75 yards, 4:54) | NAVY 43–14 |
| 3 | 1:33 | NAVY | Daniel Davies 34-yard field goal (11 plays, 75 yards, 3:16) | NAVY 46–14 |
| 4 | 13:27 | TULSA | Steven Anderson 1-yard run (Zack Long kick) (11 plays, 75 yards, 3:16) | NAVY 46–21 |
| 4 | 3:52 | NAVY | Vincent Terrell Jr. 3-yard run (Daniel Davies kick) (6 plays, 35 yards, 3:44) | NAVY 53–21 |

| Statistics | Tulsa | Navy |
|---|---|---|
| First downs | 14 | 24 |
| Plays–yards | 51–309 | 77–490 |
| Rushes–yards | 18–25 | 69–455 |
| Passing yards | 284 | 35 |
| Passing: comp–att–int | 20–33–3 | 2–8–0 |
| Time of possession | 19:34 | 40:26 |

| Team | Category | Player | Statistics |
|---|---|---|---|
| Tulsa | Passing | Davis Brin | 20–31, 284 yards, 2 TD, 2 INT |
| Tulsa | Rushing | Bill Jackson | 3 carries, 18 yards |
| Tulsa | Receiving | Keylon Stokes | 7 receptions, 152 yards, 1 TD |
| Navy | Passing | Kai Puailoa-Rojas | 1–1, 26 yards, 1 TD |
| Navy | Rushing | Daba Fofana | 21 carries, 159 yards, 3 TD |
| Navy | Receiving | Tai Lavatai | 1 reception, 26 yards, 1 TD |

=== At SMU ===
Navy Midshipmen at SMU

| Team | 1 | 2 | 3 | 4 | Total |
|---|---|---|---|---|---|
| Midshipmen | 0 | 7 | 7 | 20 | 34 |
| • Mustangs | 10 | 3 | 20 | 7 | 40 |

- Date: October 14th
- Location: Gerald J. Ford Stadium
  University Park, TX
- Game start: 7:30 p.m.
- Elapsed time: 4 hours, 1 minute
- Game attendance: 24,583
- Game weather: 88 °F (31 °C) • Weather: Sunny • Wind: S 2 MPH
- Referee: Edwin Lee
- TV announcers (ESPN): Roy Philpott (play-by-play), Andre Ware (analyst), & Paul Carcaterra (sideline)

Scoring summary
| 1 | 11:01 | SMU | Collin Rogers 30–yard field goal (8 plays, 74 yards, 3:48) | SMU 3–0 |
| 1 | 7:00 | SMU | Dylan Goffney 24–yard pass from Tanner Mordecai (Collin Rogers kick) (3 play, 56 yards, 0:53) | SMU 10–0 |
| 2 | 11:49 | SMU | Collin Rogers 46-yard field goal (11 plays, 64 yards, 3:18) | SMU 13–0 |
| 2 | 0:14 | NAVY | Vincent Terrell Jr. 24–yard pass from Tai Lavatai (Daniel Davies kick) (9 plays, 67 yards, 1:34) | SMU 13–7 |
| 3 | 11:13 | NAVY | Tai Lavatai 15-yard run (Daniel Davies kick) (6 plays, 75 yards, 3:47) | NAVY 14–13 |
| 3 | 10:40 | SMU | Tanner Mordecai 60-yard run (Two-point pass conversion failed) (2 plays, 69 yards, 0:33) | SMU 19–14 |
| 3 | 5:59 | SMU | T.J. McDaniel 1-yard run (Collin Rogers kick) (7 plays, 26 yards, 2:28) | SMU 26–14 |
| 3 | 2:49 | SMU | Jordan Kerley 33-yard pass from Tanner Mordecai (Collin Rogers kick) (2 plays, 80 yards, 0:26) | SMU 33–14 |
| 4 | 14:21 | NAVY | Jayden Umbarger 26-yard pass from Tai Lavatai (Daniel Davies kick) (10 plays, 75 yards, 3:28) | SMU 33–20 |
| 4 | 8:28 | SMU | Roderick Daniels Jr. 27-yard pass from Tanner Mordecai (Collin Rogers) (5 plays, 72 yards, 2:05) | SMU 40–20 |
| 4 | 2:31 | NAVY | Logan Point 3-yard run (Daniel Davies kick) (16 plays, 75 yards, 5:57) | SMU 40–27 |
| 4 | 0:09 | NAVY | Tai Lavatai 1-yard run (Daniel Davies kick) (13 plays, 80 yards, 1:13) | SMU 40–34 |

| Statistics | Navy | SMU |
|---|---|---|
| First downs | 32 | 16 |
| Plays–yards | 510 | 441 |
| Rushes–yards | 372 | 105 |
| Passing yards | 138 | 336 |
| Passing: comp–att–int | 9–24–1 | 20–27–0 |
| Time of possession | 40:42 | 19:18 |

| Team | Category | Player | Statistics |
|---|---|---|---|
| Navy | Passing | Tai Lavatai | 9–20, 138 yards, 2 TD, INT |
| Navy | Rushing | Tai Lavatai | 25 carries, 120 yards, 2 TD |
| Navy | Receiving | Jayden Umbarger | 25 receptions, 59 yards, TD |
| SMU | Passing | Tanner Mordecai | 20–27, 336 yards, 3 TD |
| SMU | Rushing | Tanner Mordecai | 6 carries, 74 yards, TD |
| SMU | Receiving | Dylan Goffney | 4 receptions, 116 yards, TD |

=== Houston ===
Houston Cougars at Navy Midshipmen

| Team | 1 | 2 | 3 | 4 | Total |
|---|---|---|---|---|---|
| • Cougars | 14 | 7 | 10 | 7 | 38 |
| Midshipmen | 0 | 7 | 7 | 6 | 20 |

- Date: October 22, 2022
- Location: Navy-Marine Corps Memorial Stadium
  Annapolis, MD
- Game start: 12:00 p.m.
- Elapsed time: 3 hours, 22 minutes
- Game attendance: 32,443
- Game weather: 62 °F (17 °C) • Weather: Sunny • Wind: SE 9 MPH
- Referee: Tim Rich
- TV announcers (ESPNU): Clay Matvick (play-by-play), Rocky Boiman (analyst), & Dawn Davenport (sideline)

Scoring summary
| 1 | 12:06 | HOU | Nathaniel Dell 6–yard pass from Clayton Tune (Kyle Ramsey kick) (7 plays, 76 yards, 2:54) | HOU 7–0 |
| 1 | 5:29 | HOU | Nathaniel Dell 11–yard pass from Clayton Tune (Kyle Ramsey kick) (7 play, 35 yards, 2:33) | HOU 14–0 |
| 2 | 10:20 | NAVY | Daba Fofana 25-yard run (Daniel Davies kick) (4 plays, 80 yards, 1:21) | HOU 14–7 |
| 2 | 5:18 | HOU | Matt Byrnes 3–yard pass from Clayton Tune (Kyle Ramsey kick) (9 plays, 75 yards, 5:02) | HOU 21–7 |
| 3 | 10:16 | NAVY | Jianni Woodson-Brooks 5-yard fumble return (Daniel Davies kick) (1 play, -25 yards, 0:49) | HOU 21–14 |
| 3 | 6:25 | HOU | Kyle Ramsey 24–yard field goal (10 plays, 68 yards, 3:51) | HOU 24–14 |
| 3 | 1:36 | HOU | Sam Brown 7–yard pass from Clayton Tune (Kyle Ramsey kick) (5 plays, 17 yards, 2:45) | HOU 31–14 |
| 4 | 4:56 | HOU | Sam Brown 4–yard pass from Clayton Tune (Kyle Ramsey kick) (9 plays, 63 yards, 4:49) | HOU 38–14 |
| 4 | 2:28 | NAVY | Jayden Umbarger 41–yard pass from Tai Lavatai (Two-point run conversion failed) (7 plays, 64 yards, 2:28) | HOU 38–20 |

| Statistics | Houston | Navy |
|---|---|---|
| First downs | 23 | 16 |
| Plays–yards | 64–441 | 63–326 |
| Rushes–yards | 34–180 | 50–201 |
| Passing yards | 261 | 125 |
| Passing: comp–att–int | 21–30–0 | 6–13–2 |
| Time of possession | 28:12 | 31:48 |

| Team | Category | Player | Statistics |
|---|---|---|---|
| Houston | Passing | Clayton Tune | 21/30, 261 yards, 5 TD |
| Houston | Rushing | Stacy Sneed | 20 carries, 100 yards |
| Houston | Receiving | Nathaniel Dell | 8 receptions, 93 yards, 2 TD |
| Navy | Passing | Tai Lavatai | 6/13, 125 yards, TD, INT |
| Navy | Rushing | Daba Fofana | 20 carries, 89 yards, TD |
| Navy | Receiving | Jayden Umbarger | 2 receptions, 93 yards, TD |

=== Temple ===
Temple Owls at Navy Midshipmen

| Team | 1 | 2 | 3 | 4 | Total |
|---|---|---|---|---|---|
| Owls | 0 | 3 | 7 | 10 | 20 |
| • Midshipmen | 13 | 7 | 7 | 7 | 34 |

- Date: October 29, 2022
- Location: Navy-Marine Corps Memorial Stadium
  Annapolis, MD
- Game start: 3:30 p.m.
- Elapsed time: 3 hours, 38 minutes
- Game attendance: 31,141
- Game weather: 60 °F (16 °C) • Weather: Sunny • Wind: NE 10 MPH
- Referee: Hank Johns
- TV announcers (CBSSN): John Sadak (play-by-play), Randy Cross (analyst), & Sheehan Stanwick Burch (sideline)

Scoring summary
| 1 | 6:45 | NAVY | Daniel Davies 31–yard field goal (14 plays, 34 yards, 7:39) | NAVY 3–0 |
| 1 | 2:53 | NAVY | Daba Fofana 15–yard run (Daniel Davies kick) (3 play, 17 yards, 1:08) | NAVY 10–0 |
| 1 | 0:39 | NAVY | Daniel Davies 36–yard field goal (4 play, 6 yards, 2:05) | NAVY 13–0 |
| 2 | 3:38 | TEMPLE | Camden Price 38-yard field goal (11 plays, 50 yards, 3:46) | NAVY 13–3 |
| 3 | 13:49 | TEMPLE | Layton Jordan 0–yard fumble return (Camden Price kick) (1 play, 0 yards, 1:11) | NAVY 13–10 |
| 3 | 0:51 | NAVY | Anton Hall Jr. 16–yard run (Daniel Davies kick) (12 plays, 56 yards, 6:44) | NAVY 20–10 |
| 4 | 9:45 | TEMPLE | Amad Anderson Jr. 20–yard pass from E.J. Warner (Camden Price kick) (6 play, 70 yards, 2:22) | NAVY 20–17 |
| 4 | 1:08 | TEMPLE | Camden Price 22–yard field goal (9 play, 66 yards, 1:23) | TIE 20–20 |
| OT | 0:00 | NAVY | Xavier Arline 23–yard run (Daniel Davies kick) (2 plays, 25 yards, 0:00) | NAVY 27–20 |

| Statistics | Temple | Navy |
|---|---|---|
| First downs | 14 | 12 |
| Plays–yards | 68–288 | 72–224 |
| Rushes–yards | 20–20 | 70–224 |
| Passing yards | 268 | 0 |
| Passing: comp–att–int | 24–48–2 | 0–2–0 |
| Time of possession | 22:51 | 37:09 |

| Team | Category | Player | Statistics |
|---|---|---|---|
| Temple | Passing | E. J. Warner | 24/48, 268 yards, 1 TD, 2 INT |
| Temple | Rushing | Edward Saydee | 14 carries, 61 yards |
| Temple | Receiving | Amad Anderson Jr. | 8 receptions, 114 yards, 1 TD |
| Navy | Passing | Tai Lavatai | 0/1, 0 yards |
| Navy | Rushing | Daba Fofana | 24 carries, 63 yards, 1 TD |
| Navy | Receiving | | |

=== At Cincinnati ===
Temple Owls at Navy Midshipmen

| Team | 1 | 2 | 3 | 4 | Total |
|---|---|---|---|---|---|
| Midshipmen | 0 | 3 | 7 | 0 | 10 |
| • Bearcats | 6 | 7 | 7 | 0 | 20 |

- Date: November 5, 2022
- Location: Nippert Stadium
  Cincinnati, OH
- Game start: 4:00 p.m.
- Elapsed time: 2 hours, 55 minutes
- Game attendance: 38,461
- Game weather: 74 °F (23 °C) • Weather: Cloudy • Wind: N 19 MPH
- Referee: Nate Black
- TV announcers (ESPNU): Kevin Brown (play-by-play) & Hutson Mason (analyst)

Scoring summary
| 1 | 13:08 | CIN | Ryan Coe 47–yard field goal (5 plays, 46 yards, 1:52) | CIN 3–0 |
| 1 | 5:04 | CIN | Ryan Coe 27–yard field goal (14 plays, 60 yards, 6:03) | CIN 6–0 |
| 2 | 7:12 | CIN | Tyler Scott 38-yard field pass from Ben Bryant (Ryan Coe kick) (12 plays, 87 yards, 5:01) | CIN 13–0 |
| 2 | 1:55 | NAVY | Daniel Davies 16–yard field goal (9 plays, 54 yards, 5:17) | CIN 13–3 |
| 3 | 9:51 | CIN | Tyler Scott 38–yard pass from Ben Bryant (Ryan Coe kick) (12 plays, 98 yards, 2:57) | CIN 20–3 |
| 3 | 1:14 | NAVY | Massai Maynor 1–yard run (Daniel Davies kick) (16 plays, 75 yards, 8:37) | CIN 20–10 |
| 4 | | | No scoring plays this quarter. |

| Statistics | Navy | Cincinnati |
|---|---|---|
| First downs | 14 | 18 |
| Plays–yards | 59–260 | 55–354 |
| Rushes–yards | 53–176 | 20–55 |
| Passing yards | 84 | 299 |
| Passing: comp–att–int | 4–6–0 | 25–35–0 |
| Time of possession | 33:13 | 26:47 |

| Team | Category | Player | Statistics |
|---|---|---|---|
| Navy | Passing | Massai Maynor | 3/5, 81 yards |
| Navy | Rushing | Xavier Arline | 12 carries, 87 yards |
| Navy | Receiving | Nathan Kent | 1 reception, 32 yards |
| Cincinnati | Passing | Ben Bryant | 25/35, 299 yards, 2 TD |
| Cincinnati | Rushing | Charles McClelland | 11 carries, 60 yards |
| Cincinnati | Receiving | Tyler Scott | 10 receptions, 139 yards, 2 TD |

=== Vs. No. 20 Notre Dame ===
No. 20 Notre Dame vs. Navy
(Rip Miller Trophy)

| Team | 1 | 2 | 3 | 4 | Total |
|---|---|---|---|---|---|
| • No. 20 Fighting Irish | 14 | 21 | 0 | 0 | 35 |
| Midshipmen | 6 | 7 | 3 | 16 | 32 |

- Date: November 12, 2022
- Location: M&T Bank Stadium
  Baltimore, MD
- Game start: 12:00 p.m. EDT
- Elapsed time: 3 hours, 24 minutes
- Game attendance: 62,124
- Game weather: Temperature • 70 °F (21 °C) • Weather: Sunny • Wind: W 10 MPH
- Referee: Riley Johnson
- TV announcers (ABC): Dave Flemming (play–by–play), Dan Orlovsky (analyst), & Kris Budden (sideline)

Scoring summary
| 1 | 10:36 | ND | Audric Estimé 30–yard pass from Drew Pyne (Blake Grupe kick) (9 plays, 67 yards, 4:24) | ND 7–0 |
| 1 | 4:28 | ND | Braden Lenzy 38–yard pass from Drew Pyne (Blake Grupe kick) (6 plays, 83 yards, 2:42) | ND 14–0 |
| 1 | 2:19 | NAVY | Daba Fofana 36–yard run (Bijan Nichols PAT failed) (5 plays, 75 yards, 3:09) | ND 14–6 |
| 2 | 12:27 | ND | Chris Tyree 5–yard pass from Drew Pyne (Blake Grupe kick) (10 plays, 83 yards, 4:52) | ND 21–6 |
| 2 | 7:49 | NAVY | Xavier Arline 2–yard run from (Bijan Nichols kick) (7 plays, 80 yards, 4:38) | ND 21–13 |
| 2 | 2:19 | ND | Drew Pyne 11–yard run (Blake Grupe kick) (3 plays, 41 yards, 1:18) | ND 28–13 |
| 2 | 4:16 | ND | Jayden Thomas 37–yard pass from Drew Pyne (Blake Grupe kick) (1 play, 37 yards, 0:07) | ND 35–13 |
| 3 | 4:59 | NAVY | Bijan Nichols 26–yard field goal (16 plays, 72 yards, 10:01) | ND 38–16 |
| 4 | 14:47 | NAVY | Mark Walker 23–yard pass from Xavier Arline (Bijan Nichols kick) (1 play, 23 yards, 0:06) | ND 35–24 |
| 4 | 1:21 | NAVY | Maquel Haywood 20–yard pass from Maasai Maynor (Vincent Terrell Jr. run for a Two-point conversion) (11 plays, 88 yards, 2:56) | ND 35–32 |

| Statistics | Notre Dame | Navy |
|---|---|---|
| First downs | 15 | 19 |
| Plays–yards | 55–335 | 59–363 |
| Rushes–yards | 34–66 | 46–255 |
| Passing yards | 269 | 108 |
| Passing: comp–att–int | 17–21–1 | 6–13–1 |
| Time of possession | 29:21 | 30:39 |

| Team | Category | Player | Statistics |
|---|---|---|---|
| Notre Dame | Passing | Drew Pyne | 17–21, 269 yards, 4 TD, 1 INT |
| Notre Dame | Rushing | Audric Estimé | 8 carries, 49 yards |
| Notre Dame | Receiving | Jayden Thomas | 3 receptions, 80 yards, 1 TD |
| Navy | Passing | Xavier Arline | 2–4, 57 yards, 1 TD |
| Navy | Rushing | Daba Fofana | 15 carries, 133 yards, 1 TD |
| Navy | Receiving | Mark Walker | 3 receptions, 67 yards, 1 TD |

=== At No. 20 UCF ===
Navy at No. 20 UCF

| Team | 1 | 2 | 3 | 4 | Total |
|---|---|---|---|---|---|
| • Midshipmen | 7 | 7 | 3 | 0 | 17 |
| Knights | 0 | 6 | 8 | 0 | 14 |

- Date: November 19, 2022
- Location: FBC Mortgage Stadium
  Orlando, FL
- Game start: 11:00 a.m. EDT
- Elapsed time: 3 hours, 8 minutes
- Game attendance: 44,813
- Game weather: Temperature • 72 °F (22 °C) • Weather: Sunny • Wind: N/A
- Referee: Luke Richman
- TV announcers (ESPN2): Brian Custer (play–by–play), Dustin Fox (analyst), & Dana Boyle (sideline)

Scoring summary
| 1 | 8:20 | NAVY | Xavier Arline 1–yard run (Bijan Nichols kick) (11 plays, 75 yards, 6:40) | NAVY 7–0 |
| 2 | 12:27 | UCF | Colton Boomer 21–yard field goal (13 plays, 55 yards, 4:30) | NAVY 7–3 |
| 2 | 8:23 | UCF | Colton Boomer 31–yard field goal (5 plays, 41 yards, 1:48) | NAVY 7–6 |
| 2 | 1:33 | NAVY | Vincent Terrell Jr. 8–yard run (Bijan Nichols kick) (13 plays, 84 yards, 6:47) | NAVY 14–6 |
| 3 | 13:25 | UCF | Javon Baker 28–yard pass from Mikey Keene (John Rhys Plumlee to Javon Baker for Two-point conversion) (5 plays, 75 yards, 1:35) | TIE 14–14 |
| 3 | 8:22 | NAVY | Bijan Nichols 45–yard field goal (4 plays, 6 yards, 1:58) | NAVY 17–14 |
| 4 | | | No scoring plays this quarter. | NAVY 17–14 |

| Statistics | Navy | UCF |
|---|---|---|
| First downs | 14 | 14 |
| Plays–yards | 64–248 | 57–314 |
| Rushes–yards | 63–284 | 24–84 |
| Passing yards | 0 | 230 |
| Passing: comp–att–int | 0–1–0 | 19–33–1 |
| Time of possession | 39:36 | 20:24 |

| Team | Category | Player | Statistics |
|---|---|---|---|
| Navy | Passing | Xavier Arline | 0–1, 0 yards |
| Navy | Rushing | Daba Fofana | 20 carries, 114 yards |
| Navy | Receiving | | |
| UCF | Passing | Mikey Keene | 8–15, 123 yards, 1 TD |
| UCF | Rushing | Isaiah Bowser | 10 carries, 64 yards |
| UCF | Receiving | Javon Baker | 6 receptions, 101 yards, 1 TD |

=== Vs. Army ===
123rd Army–Navy Game
(Commander-in-Chief's Trophy)

| Team | 1 | 2 | 3 | 4 | OT | 2OT | Total |
|---|---|---|---|---|---|---|---|
| Midshipmen | 0 | 3 | 7 | 0 | 7 | 0 | 17 |
| • Black Knights | 0 | 7 | 0 | 3 | 7 | 3 | 20 |

- Date: December 10, 2022
- Location: Lincoln Financial Field
  Philadelphia, PA
- Game start: 3:00 p.m. EDT
- Elapsed time: 3 hours, 33 minutes
- Game attendance: 69,117
- Game weather: Temperature • 43 °F (6 °C) • Weather: Sunny • Wind: NE 7 MPH
- Referee: Marcus Woods
- TV announcers (CBS): Brad Nessler (play–by–play), Gary Danielson (analyst), & Jenny Dell (sideline)

Scoring summary
| 1 | | | No scoring plays this quarter. |
| 2 | 12:36 | NAVY | Bijan Nichols 44–yard field goal (4 plays, 9 yards, 2:03) | NAVY 3–0 |
| 2 | 1:06 | ARMY | Jabril Williams 31–yard return of blocked punt (Quinn Maretzki kick) (3 plays, -4 yards, 2:07) | ARMY 7–3 |
| 3 | 4:09 | NAVY | Anton Hall Jr. 77–yard run (Bijan Nichols kick) (1 play, 77 yards, 0:12) | NAVY 10–7 |
| 4 | 1:53 | ARMY | Quinn Maretzki 37–yard field goal (7 plays, 34 yards, 3:28) | TIE 10–10 |
| OT | 0:00 | ARMY | Markel Johnson 25–yard run (Quinn Maretzki kick) (1 play, 25 yards) | ARMY 17–10 |
| OT | 0:00 | NAVY | Marquel Haywood 25–yard pass from Xavier Arline (Bijan Nichols kick) (1 play, 25 yards) | TIE 17–17 |
| 2OT | 0:00 | ARMY | Quinn Maretzki 39–yard field goal (4 plays, 3 yards) | ARMY 20–17 |

| Statistics | Navy | Army |
|---|---|---|
| First downs | 11 | 10 |
| Plays–yards | 61–284 | 60–153 |
| Rushes–yards | 57–259 | 48–125 |
| Passing yards | 25 | 28 |
| Passing: comp–att–int | 1–4–0 | 2–12–0 |
| Time of possession | 32:27 | 27:33 |

| Team | Category | Player | Statistics |
|---|---|---|---|
| Navy | Passing | Xavier Arline | 1–1, 25 yards, 1 TD |
| Navy | Rushing | Xavier Arline | 28 carries, 102 yards |
| Navy | Receiving | Maquel Haywood | 1 reception, 25 yards, 1 TD |
| Army | Passing | Cade Ballard | 2–10, 28 yards |
| Army | Rushing | Tyhier Tyler | 23 carries, 62 yards |
| Army | Receiving | Braheam Murphy | 2 receptions, 28 yards |
