= The Keg of Nails =

American college football trophy

Keg of Nails
- Cincinnati Bearcats Louisville Cardinals
- Sport: Football
- First meeting: October 2, 1929; Cincinnati 7, Louisville 0
- Latest meeting: December 17, 2022; Louisville 24, Cincinnati 7

Statistics
- Total meetings: 54
- All-time series: Cincinnati leads, 30–23–1 (.565)
- Largest victory: Louisville, 70–7 (2004)
- Longest win streak: Cincinnati, 12 (1929–1969)
- Current win streak: Louisville, 3 (2012–present)

Locations of Cincinnati and Louisville

The Keg of Nails is a traveling trophy continuously awarded to the winner of the American college football rivalry game between the Cincinnati Bearcats and Louisville Cardinals. The rivalry has stretched over the span of four conferences from the Missouri Valley Conference, to Conference USA, and more recently in the Big East Conference, which in 2013 was renamed to the American Athletic Conference. It is believed to be the oldest rivalry for the Louisville football team and the second-oldest for Cincinnati, only behind the Victory Bell with the Miami RedHawks.

The rivalry went on hiatus following the 2013 season, as Louisville moved to the Atlantic Coast Conference on July 1, 2014. Cincinnati leads the series 30–23–1. Cincinnati in the interim was invited to the Big 12 conference and joined in 2023.

== Series history ==
The series was played sporadically before becoming an annual match up from 1966 to 2013, with only a brief hiatus from 1992 to 1996. The match-up gained more significance with the growth of both programs into the 2000s, primarily with the success under coaches John L. Smith and Bobby Petrino for Louisville and Mark Dantonio, Brian Kelly, and Butch Jones for Cincinnati. Both programs would challenge for and win titles during their shared time in Conference USA and the Big East.

The trophy is a replica of a keg used to ship nails. The exchange is believed to have been initiated by fraternity chapters on the UC and U of L campuses, signifying that the winning players in the game were "tough as nails." The present keg is actually a replacement for the original award, which was misplaced by Louisville, lost during some construction of office facilities. It is adorned with the logos of both schools and the scores of the series games.

=== Notable games ===
November 8, 1997: Bearcat return specialist Tinker Keck returned two punts for touchdowns, tying the NCAA record at that time. Cincinnati defeated Louisville, 28–9.

November 28, 2003: The Cardinals came to Cincinnati in what went down as a shootout on a snowy afternoon. The Bearcats and QB Gino Guidugli overcame a 28-7 second quarter deficit, and the team was ahead, 40–35, with 2:20 remaining in the game. An impressive 54-yard touchdown pass by Stefan LeFors with 70 seconds left was enough to help Louisville escape with a 43–40 victory. This was the final Keg of Nails game by Cincinnati head coach Rick Minter.

October 14, 2006:The Bearcats took an early lead in the game, but the No. 7 Cardinals led by head coach Bobby Petrino were able to score twice at the end of the half, including on a 1-yard pass by quarterback Brian Brohm, to take a 13–10 lead to halftime. Late in the fourth quarter, the Bearcats had a chance to win with another pass in the endzone. However, it was knocked down by Cardinal cornerback Gavin Smart to preserve the win. The Cardinals won, 23–17, and continued their 15-game home winning streak.

November 14, 2008: The No. 22 Bearcats, searching for their first Keg of Nails victory in six seasons, came to Louisville to take on a struggling Cardinals team. Cincinnati quarterback Tony Pike exited the game with an injury in the fourth quarter. The former starter, replaced by Pike after breaking his leg, Dustin Grutza entered the game and led the game-winning, seventy-two-yard drive for the Bearcats to win, 28–20. The Bearcats went on to win their first Big East conference title.

December 5, 2013: In a prime-time Thursday night game, the No. 16 Cardinals came into Nippert Stadium to play the No. 23 Bearcats. Teddy Bridgewater had a fantastic game, leading Louisville to a 31–24 OT victory.

December 17, 2022: The Keg was revived in the postseason for the 2022 Fenway Bowl. The resumption of the series gained further notoriety when then Louisville head coach Scott Satterfield was announced as the new head coach at Cincinnati after the departure of Luke Fickell. Louisville went on to win, 24–7.

== Game results ==
Cincinnati victories	Louisville victories	Tie games

No.	Date	Location	Winner	Score
1	October 2, 1929	Parkway Field	Cincinnati	7–0
2	September 24, 1938	Nippert Stadium	Cincinnati	19–0
3	September 28, 1940	Nippert Stadium	Cincinnati	7–0
4	September 27, 1941	Nippert Stadium	Cincinnati	28–7
5	September 26, 1942	Nippert Stadium	Cincinnati	51–0
6	October 7, 1950	Nippert Stadium	Cincinnati	28–20
7	October 13, 1951	Nippert Stadium	Cincinnati	38–0
8	November 7, 1953	Parkway Field	Cincinnati	41–0
9	November 12, 1966	Nippert Stadium	Cincinnati	17–3
10	November 11, 1967	Cardinal Stadium	Cincinnati	13–7
11	November 9, 1968	Nippert Stadium	Cincinnati	37–7
12	November 8, 1969	Cardinal Stadium	Cincinnati	31–21
13	November 14, 1970	Nippert Stadium	Louisville	28–14
14	November 27, 1971	Cardinal Stadium	Cincinnati	19–16
15	October 28, 1972	Nippert Stadium	Louisville	38–13
16	October 27, 1973	Cardinal Stadium	Louisville	10–8
17	September 28, 1974	Nippert Stadium	Cincinnati	7–6
18	September 27, 1975	Cardinal Stadium	Cincinnati	46–27
19	November 27, 1976	Nippert Stadium	Cincinnati	20–6
20	September 17, 1977	Cardinal Stadium	Tie	17–17
21	September 23, 1978	Nippert Stadium	Louisville	28–14
22	September 22, 1979	Cardinal Stadium	Louisville	22–19
23	November 15, 1980	Cardinal Stadium	Louisville	20–0
24	November 14, 1981	Nippert Stadium	Cincinnati	24–0
25	September 11, 1982	Riverfront Stadium	Cincinnati	38–16
26	September 24, 1983	Cardinal Stadium	Louisville	31–23
27	October 27, 1984	Riverfront Stadium	Cincinnati	40–21
28	October 19, 1985	Cardinal Stadium	Cincinnati	31–9

No.	Date	Location	Winner	Score
29	October 4, 1986	Nippert Stadium	Cincinnati	24–17
30	September 12, 1987	Cardinal Stadium	Cincinnati	25–0
31	October 29, 1988	Nippert Stadium	Louisville	21–6
32	September 30, 1989	Cardinal Stadium	Louisville	37–17
33	November 3, 1990	Riverfront Stadium	No. 25 Louisville	41–16
34	October 5, 1991	Cardinal Stadium	Cincinnati	30–7
35	October 31, 1992	Nippert Stadium	Louisville	27–17
36	October 26, 1996	Cardinal Stadium	Cincinnati	10–7
37	November 8, 1997	Nippert Stadium	Cincinnati	28–9
38	October 3, 1998	Cardinal Stadium	Louisville	62–19
39	November 6, 1999	Nippert Stadium	Louisville	23–13
40	October 14, 2000	Cardinal Stadium	Louisville	38–24
41	October 27, 2001	Nippert Stadium	Louisville	28–13
42	November 7, 2002	Cardinal Stadium	Cincinnati	24–14
43	November 28, 2003	Nippert Stadium	Louisville	43–40
44	November 27, 2004	Cardinal Stadium	No. 9 Louisville	70–7
45	October 22, 2005	Nippert Stadium	Louisville	46–22
46	October 14, 2006	Cardinal Stadium	No. 7 Louisville	23–17
47	October 13, 2007	Nippert Stadium	Louisville	28–24
48	November 14, 2008	Cardinal Stadium	No. 22 Cincinnati	28–20
49	November 24, 2009	Nippert Stadium	No. 5 Cincinnati	41–10
50	October 15, 2010	Cardinal Stadium	Cincinnati	35–27
51	October 15, 2011	Paul Brown Stadium	Cincinnati	25–16
52	October 26, 2012	Cardinal Stadium	No. 16 Louisville	34–31^{OT}
53	December 5, 2013	Nippert Stadium	No. 19 Louisville	31–24^{OT}
54	December 17, 2022^{A}	Fenway Park	Louisville	24–7
Series: Cincinnati leads 30–23–1
^{A} 2022 Fenway Bowl

=== Wins by location ===
Category	Cincinnati	Louisville	Tie
Boston, MA	0	1	0
Cincinnati, OH	17	12	0
Louisville, KY	13	10	1

=== Wins by venue ===
Category	Cincinnati	Louisville	Tie
Cardinal Stadium	3	5	0
Fenway Park	0	1	0
Nippert Stadium	14	11	0
Old Cardinal Stadium	8	5	1
Parkway Field	2	0	0
Paul Brown Stadium	1	0	0
Riverfront Stadium	2	1	0

== See also ==
- List of NCAA college football rivalry games
