= Myles Montgomery =

American football player (born 2003)

No. 39 – New England Patriots
- Position: Running back
- Roster status: Injured reserve

Personal information
- Born: April 4, 2003 (age 23)
- Listed height: 5 ft 10 in (1.78 m)
- Listed weight: 205 lb (93 kg)

Career information
- High school: Duncan U. Fletcher (Neptune Beach, Florida)
- College: Cincinnati (2021–2023); UCF (2024–2025)
- NFL draft: 2026: undrafted

Career history
- New England Patriots (2026–present)
- Stats at Pro Football Reference

Myles Montgomery (born April 4, 2003) is an American football running back for the New England Patriots of the National Football League (NFL). He played college football for the Cincinnati Bearcats and UCF Knights.

== Early life ==
Montgomery attended Duncan U. Fletcher High School in Neptune Beach, Florida. He committed to play college football for the Cincinnati Bearcats.

== College career ==
In three years at Cincinnati from 2021 to 2023, Montgomery recorded 548 yards and four touchdowns on 80 carries in 20 games played. After the 2023 season, he entered the NCAA transfer portal.

Montgomery transferred to play for the UCF Knights. In 2024, he rushed for 293 yards and four touchdowns on 51 carries. In week 6 of the 2025 season, Montgomery rushed for 110 yards and two touchdowns on 22 carries in a loss to Kansas. He finished the season with 705 rushing yards for four touchdowns and 17 catches for 182 yards. After the season, Montgomery declared for the NFL draft.

== Professional career ==
Pre-draft measurables
| Height | Weight | Arm length | Hand span | Wingspan | 40-yard dash | 10-yard split | 20-yard split | 20-yard shuttle | Three-cone drill | Vertical jump | Broad jump | Bench press |
|---|---|---|---|---|---|---|---|---|---|---|---|---|
| 5 ft 9 7/8 in (1.77 m) | 205 lb (93 kg) | 30 1/2 in (0.77 m) | 9 in (0.23 m) | 6 ft 1 1/8 in (1.86 m) | 4.44 s | 1.51 s | 2.57 s | 4.25 s | 7.41 s | 37.0 in (0.94 m) | 10 ft 4 in (3.15 m) | 22 reps |
All values from Pro Day

After going unselected in the 2026 NFL draft, Montgomery signed with the New England Patriots as an undrafted free agent. He was waived/injured by the team on August 12, 2026.
