= Kelsey Riggs Cuff =

American journalist

- Born: Charleston, South Carolina, U.S.
- Education: Charleston Southern University
- Occupations: anchor, reporter
- Employer(s): ESPN, ACC Network

Kelsey Riggs Cuff is an anchor/reporter for ESPN/ACC Network. She has multiple duties from being a sideline reporter for ACC Football Games to anchoring several ACC Network programs, including All ACC, and anchoring SportsCenter.

== Early life ==
Born in Charleston, South Carolina, her parents are Pam and Bryan Riggs. She was first bitten by the broadcasting bug while reading the news announcements in Elementary School to her classmates. She graduated from the James Island Charter High School where she was inducted into the school's Hall of Fame during the inaugural ceremony in 2023. An alumna of Charleston Southern University, Kelsey earned a degree in communications while playing soccer for the Buccaneers. She has two sisters.

== Career ==
Riggs started her career at WBTW in Myrtle Beach, South Carolina and spent three years at WCNC-TV in Charlotte, North Carolina where she covered the Carolina Panthers in Super Bowl 50 before getting hired by ESPN to be a part of the first on-air talents of the ACC Network. She was named the new host of ACC Huddle in 2023. A year later, she was named to be a full-time Sportscenter anchor.

== Personal Life ==
Kelsey married ESPN analyst Dalen Cuff on January, 5, 2025.
