= 2023 Las Vegas Bowl =

Postseason college football bowl game

2023 SRS Distribution Las Vegas Bowl
- 31st Las Vegas Bowl
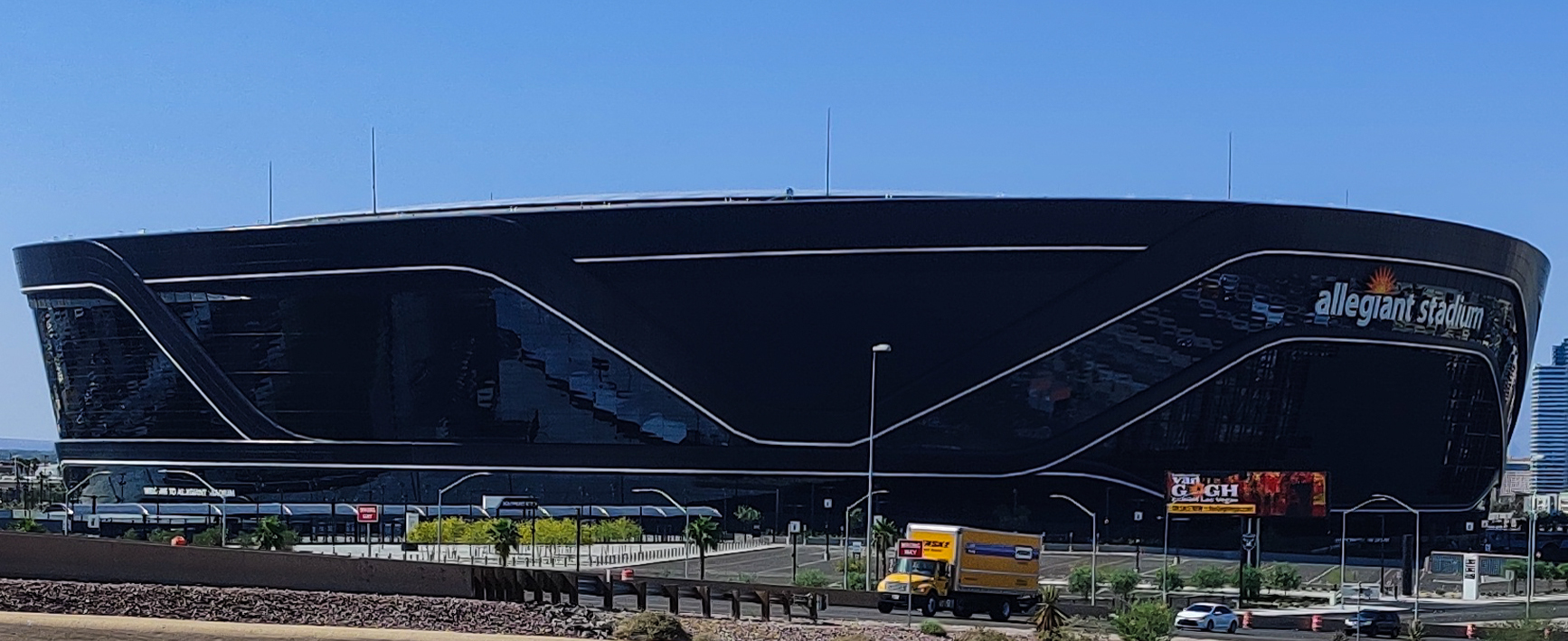
- Allegiant Stadium in Paradise, Nevada, hosted the Las Vegas Bowl.
Utah Utes	Northwestern Wildcats
(8–4)	(7–5)
Pac-12	Big Ten
7	14
Head coach: Kyle Whittingham	Head coach: David Braun
	1	2	3	4	Total
Utah	0	0	0	7	7
Northwestern	0	7	0	7	14
- Date: December 23, 2023
- Season: 2023
- Stadium: Allegiant Stadium
- Location: Paradise, Nevada
- MVP: Ben Bryant (QB, Northwestern)
- Favorite: Utah by 6.5
- Referee: Kevin Boitmann (Big 12)
- Attendance: 20,897

United States TV coverage
- Network: ABC
- Announcers: Sean McDonough (play-by-play), Greg McElroy (analyst), and Stormy Buonantony (sideline)

International TV coverage
- Network: ESPN Deportes

The 2023 Las Vegas Bowl was a college football bowl game played on December 23, 2023, at Allegiant Stadium in Paradise, Nevada, southwest of adjacent Las Vegas. The 31st annual Las Vegas Bowl featured the Utah Utes from the Pac-12 Conference and the Northwestern Wildcats from the Big Ten Conference. The game began at approximately 4:30 p.m. PST and was aired on ABC. The Las Vegas Bowl was one of the 2023–24 bowl games concluding the 2023 FBS football season. The game was sponsored by SRS Distribution, a roofing materials and building supplies company, and was officially known as the SRS Distribution Las Vegas Bowl.

== Teams ==
Consistent with conference tie-ins, the game featured the Northwestern Wildcats from the Big Ten Conference and the Utah Utes from the Pac-12 Conference.

This was the fourth meeting between Northwestern and Utah. Entering the game, the Wildcats held a 2–1 series lead, including a win over the Utes in the 2018 Holiday Bowl.

=== Northwestern Wildcats ===
The Wildcats entered the game with a 7–5 record (5–4 in the Big Ten), tied for second place in their conference's West Division.

This was the first Las Vegas Bowl appearance for Northwestern.

=== Utah Utes ===
The Utes entered the game with an 8–4 record (5–4 in the Pac-12), tied for fourth place in their conference.

This was Utah's sixth Las Vegas bowl, tying in-state rival BYU for the most appearances in the game. Entering the game, the Utes held a 4–1 record in the Las Vegas Bowl, tied with Boise State for most Las Vegas Bowls wins.

This was Utah's final game as a member of the Pac-12, as the Utes committed to join the Big 12 Conference for the 2024 season.

== Game summary ==
2023 SRS Distribution Las Vegas Bowl

Quarter	1	2	3	4	Total
Utah	0	0	0	7	7
Northwestern	0	7	0	7	14

at Allegiant Stadium • Paradise, Nevada

- Date: Saturday, December 23, 2023
- Game time: 4:30 p.m. PST
- Game weather: N/A (indoor stadium)
- Game attendance: 20,897
- Referee: Kevin Boitmann
- TV announcers (ABC): Sean McDonough (play-by-play), Greg McElroy (analyst), and Stormy Buonantony (sideline)
- Box score

Game information
First quarter
- No scoring plays

Second quarter

- NU – Camron Johnson 12-yard pass from Ben Bryant (Jack Olsen kick), 1:20. Wildcats 7–0. Drive: 8 plays, 78 yards, 2:22.

Third quarter

- No scoring plays

Fourth quarter

- UTAH – Micah Bernard 6-yard run (Cole Becker kick), 12:38. Tied 7–7. Drive: 8 plays, 60 yards, 3:59.
- NU – Bryce Kirtz 19-yard pass from Ben Bryant (Jack Olsen kick), 6:19. Wildcats 14–7. Drive: 3 plays, 53 yards, 0:51.

=== Statistics ===
Statistics	UTAH	NU
First downs	13	18
Plays–yards	65–211	70–290
Rushes–yards	51–138	31–65
Passing yards	73	225
Passing: comp–att–int	9–14–2	24–39–0
Turnovers		
Time of possession	34:21	25:39

Team	Category	Player	Statistics
Utah	Passing	Bryson Barnes	8/13, 55 yards, 2 INT
Utah	Rushing	Ja'Quinden Jackson	8 rushes, 55 yards
Utah	Receiving	Micah Bernard	3 receptions, 24 yards
Northwestern	Passing	Ben Bryant	23/34, 222 yards, 2 TD
Northwestern	Rushing	Cam Porter	10 rushes, 33 yards
Northwestern	Receiving	Bryce Kirtz	5 receptions, 68 yards, TD
