= 2023 Utah Utes football team =

American college football season

2023 Utah Utes football

Las Vegas Bowl, L 7–14 vs. Northwestern
- Conference: Pac-12 Conference
- Record: 8–5 (5–4 Pac-12)
- Head coach: Kyle Whittingham (19th season)
- Offensive coordinator: Andy Ludwig (9th season)
- Offensive scheme: Spread
- Defensive coordinator: Morgan Scalley (8th season)
- Base defense: 4–2–5
- Home stadium: Rice–Eccles Stadium

Uniform
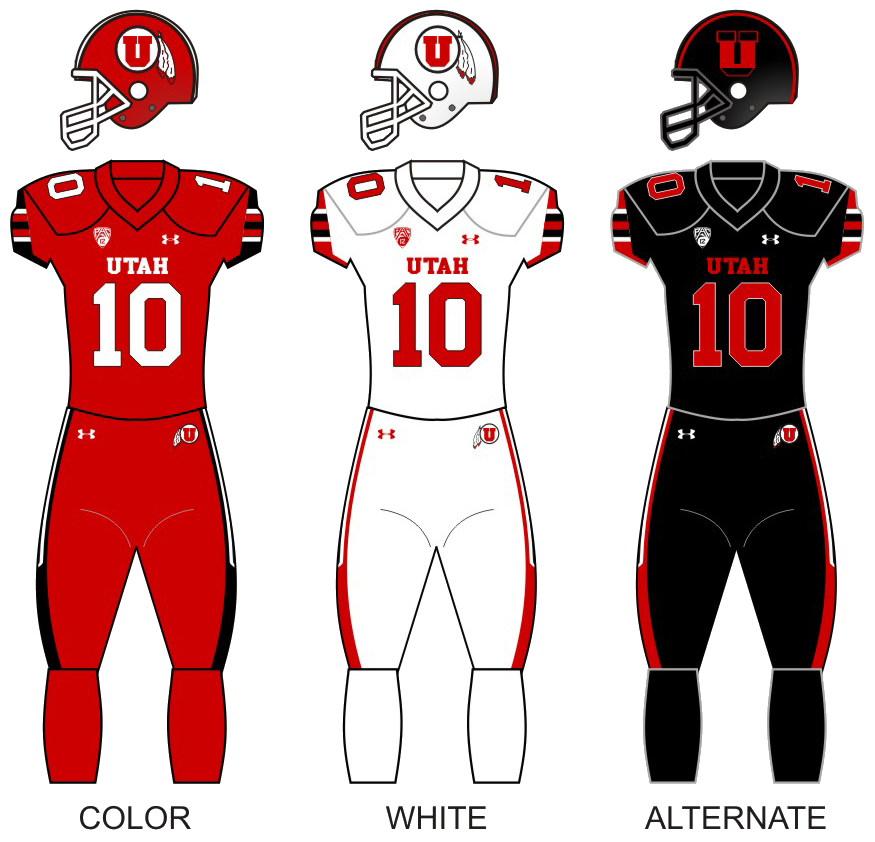

2023 Pac-12 Conference football standings
	Conf.			Overall
Team	W		L	W		L
No. 2 Washington y$^	9	–	0	14	–	1
No. 6 Oregon y	8	–	1	12	–	2
No. 11 Arizona	7	–	2	10	–	3
Oregon State	5	–	4	8	–	5
Utah	5	–	4	8	–	5
USC	5	–	4	8	–	5
California	4	–	5	6	–	7
UCLA	4	–	5	8	–	5
Washington State	2	–	7	5	–	7
Stanford	2	–	7	3	–	9
Arizona State*	2	–	7	3	–	9
Colorado	1	–	8	4	–	8
Championship: Washington 34, Oregon 31
^ – College Football Playoff participant; $ – Conference champion; y – Championship game participant; * – Ineligible for postseason play due to self-imposed ban for 2020 recruiting violations; Rankings from AP Poll

The 2023 Utah Utes football team represented the University of Utah as a member of the Pac-12 Conference during the 2023 NCAA Division I FBS football season. The Utes were led by Kyle Whittingham in his 19th year as Utah's head coach. They played their home games at Rice–Eccles Stadium in Salt Lake City. The Utah Utes football team drew an average home attendance of 52,499 in 2023, the 37th highest in college football.

This was the Utes' final season in the Pac-12 before they move to the Big 12 Conference in 2024.

== Schedule ==
Date	Time	Opponent	Rank	Site	TV	Result	Attendance
August 31	6:00 p.m.	Florida*	No. 14	Rice–Eccles Stadium; Salt Lake City, UT	ESPN	W 24–11	53,644
September 9	10:00 a.m.	at Baylor*	No. 12	McLane Stadium; Waco, TX	ESPN	W 20–13	43,732
September 16	12:00 p.m.	No. 9 (FCS) Weber State*	No. 12	Rice–Eccles Stadium; Salt Lake City, UT	P12N	W 31–7	51,532
September 23	1:30 p.m.	No. 22 UCLA^{†}	No. 11	Rice–Eccles Stadium; Salt Lake City, UT	FOX	W 14–7	52,919
September 29	7:00 p.m.	at No. 19 Oregon State	No. 10	Reser Stadium; Corvallis, OR	FS1	L 7–21	37,372
October 14	1:00 p.m.	California	No. 16	Rice–Eccles Stadium; Salt Lake City, UT	P12N	W 34–14	52,115
October 21	6:00 p.m.	at No. 18 USC	No. 14	Los Angeles Memorial Coliseum; Los Angeles, CA	FOX	W 34–32	61,551
October 28	1:30 p.m.	No. 8 Oregon	No. 13	Rice–Eccles Stadium; Salt Lake City, UT (College GameDay)	FOX	L 6–35	53,586
November 4	12:00 p.m.	Arizona State	No. 18	Rice–Eccles Stadium; Salt Lake City, UT	P12N	W 55–3	52,104
November 11	1:30 p.m.	at No. 5 Washington	No. 18	Husky Stadium; Seattle, WA	FOX	L 28–35	70,976
November 18	12:30 p.m.	at No. 17 Arizona	No. 22	Arizona Stadium; Tucson, AZ	P12N	L 18–42	50,800
November 25	1:00 p.m.	Colorado		Rice–Eccles Stadium; Salt Lake City, UT (Rumble in the Rockies)	P12N	W 23–17	51,595
December 23	5:30 p.m.	vs. Northwestern		Allegiant Stadium; Las Vegas, NV (Las Vegas Bowl)	ABC	L 7–14	20,897
*Non-conference game; ^{†}Homecoming; Rankings from AP Poll (and CFP Rankings, after October 31) - Released prior to game; All times are in Mountain time

== Game summaries ==
=== vs Florida ===
Uniform Combination
Helmet	Jersey	Pants

Game One: Florida Gators (0–0) at No. 14 Utah Utes (0–0) – Game summary

Quarter	1	2	3	4	Total
Florida	3	0	0	8	11
No. 14 Utah	7	10	7	0	24

at Rice-Eccles Stadium • Salt Lake City, Utah

- Date: August 31
- Game time: 6:00 p.m. MST/5:00 p.m. PST
- Game weather: Sunny, 92 °F (33 °C)
- Game attendance: 53,644
- Referee: David Smith
- TV announcers (ESPN): Chris Fowler (play-by-play), Kirk Herbstreit (analyst), Holly Rowe (sideline)
- Box Score

Game information

First quarter

- (13:10) UTAH – Money Parks 70-yard pass from Bryson Barnes (Cole Becker kick) (Drive: 1 play, 70 yards, 0:11; Utah 7–0)
- (2:27) FLA – Adam Mihalek 32-yard field goal (Drive: 7 plays, 65 yards, 4:30; Utah 7–3)

Second quarter

- (7:50) UTAH – Nate Johnson 27-yard rush (Cole Becker kick) (Drive: 10 plays, 80 yards, 5:45; Utah 14–3)
- (2:27) UTAH – Cole Becker 51-yard field goal (Drive: 7 plays, 14 yards, 2:57; Utah 17–3)

Third quarter

- (10:51) UTAH – Bryson Barnes 5-yard rush (Cole Becker kick) (Drive: 3 plays, 11 yards, 1:06; Utah 24–3)

Fourth quarter

- (9:22) FLA – Caleb Douglas 19-yard pass from Graham Mertz (Graham Mertz-Eugene Wilson III pass) (Drive: 13 plays, 98 yards, 6:54; Utah 24–11)

Statistics	FLA	UTAH
First downs	17	13
Total yards	65–346	53–270
Rushing yards	21–13	30–105
Passing yards	333	165
Passing: Comp–Att–Int	31–44–1	15–23–0
Time of possession	31:52	28:08

Team	Category	Player	Statistics
Florida	Passing	Graham Mertz	31/44, 333 yards, TD, INT
Florida	Rushing	Trevor Etienne	7 carries, 25 yards
Florida	Receiving	Ricky Pearsall	8 receptions, 92 yards
Utah	Passing	Bryson Barnes	12/18, 159 yards, TD
Utah	Rushing	Nate Johnson	6 carries, 45 yards, TD
Utah	Receiving	Money Parks	1 reception, 70 yards, TD

=== at Baylor ===
No. 12 Utah Utes (1–0) at Baylor Bears (0–1) – Game summary

Quarter	1	2	3	4	Total
No. 12 Utes	0	3	3	14	20
Bears	0	10	3	0	13

at McLane Stadium • Waco, Texas

- Date: September 9
- Game time: 10:09 a.m. MST/9:09 a.m. PST
- Game weather: Sunny • 90 °F (32 °C)
- Game attendance: 43,732
- Referee: Christopher Wiggins
- TV announcers (ESPN): Bob Wischusen (play-by-play), Robert Griffin III (analyst), Kris Budden (sideline)

Game information

First quarter

No scoring plays

Second quarter

- (13:03) BAY – Isaiah Hankins 34-yard field goal (Drive: 6 plays, 15 yards, 2:05; Baylor 3–0)
- (9:04) UTAH – Cole Becker 31-yard field goal (Drive: 7 plays, 62 yards, 3:59; Tied 3–3)
- (3:23) BAY – Sawyer Robertson 4-yard run (Isaiah Hankins kick) (Drive: 11 plays, 79 yards, 5:41; Baylor 10–3)

Third quarter

- (11:00) BAY – Isaiah Hankins 24-yard field goal (Drive: 10 plays, 68 yards, 4:00; Baylor 13–3)
- (4:05) UTAH – Cole Becker 46-yard field goal (Drive: 7 plays, 9 yards, 3:43; Baylor 13–6)

Fourth quarter

- (1:59) UTAH – Nate Johnson 7-yard run (Cole Becker kick) (Drive: 6 plays, 29 yards, 1:18; Tied 13–13)
- (0:17) UTAH – Jaylon Glover 11-yard run (Cole Becker kick) (Drive: 6 plays, 29 yards, 1:18; Utah 20–13)

Statistics	Utah	Baylor
First downs	20	14
Plays–yards	73–377	57–339
Rushes–yards	47–224	29–121
Passing yards	153	218
Passing: comp–att–int	12–26–1	12–28–2
Turnovers		
Time of possession	36:17	23:43

Team	Category	Player	Statistics
Utah	Passing	Nate Johnson	6–7, 82 yards
Utah	Rushing	Ja'Quinden Jackson	19 carries, 129 yards
Utah	Receiving	Mikey Matthews	4 receptions, 48 yards
Baylor	Passing	Sawyer Robertson	12–28, 218 yards, 2 INT
Baylor	Rushing	Dominic Richardson	14 carries, 77 yards
Baylor	Receiving	Hal Presley	4 receptions, 72 yards

=== vs No. 9 Weber State (FCS) ===
No. 9 Weber State Wildcats (FCS) (2–0) at No. 12 Utah Utes (2–0) – Game summary

Quarter	1	2	3	4	Total
No. 9 Wildcats (FCS)	0	7	0	0	7
No. 12 Utes	7	10	14	0	31

at Rice-Eccles Stadium • Salt Lake City, Utah

- Date: September 16
- Game time: 12:00 p.m. MST/11:00 a.m. PST
- Game attendance: 51,532
- Referee: Ty Druse
- TV announcers (Pac-12 Network): Roxy Bernstein (play-by-play), Lincoln Kennedy (analyst)

Game information

First quarter

Second quarter

Third quarter

Fourth quarter

Statistics	Weber State (FCS)	Utah
First downs	5	23
Plays–yards	127	424
Rushes–yards	52–231	19–61
Passing yards	66	193
Passing: comp–att–int	11–23–1	13–21–0
Turnovers		
Time of possession	19:55	40:05

Team	Category	Player	Statistics
Weber State (FCS)	Passing	Kylan Weisser	11/23, 66 yards, INT
Weber State (FCS)	Rushing	Damon Bankston	8 carries, 59 yards
Weber State (FCS)	Receiving	Treyshun Hurry	2 receptions, 22 yards
Utah	Passing	Nate Johnson	13/21, 193 yards, TD
Utah	Rushing	Nate Johnson	16 carries, 71 yards, TD
Utah	Receiving	Munir McClain	3 receptions, 92 yards

=== vs No. 22 UCLA ===
No. 22 UCLA Bruins (3–0) at No. 11 Utah Utes (3–0) – Game summary

Quarter	1	2	3	4	Total
No. 22 Bruins	0	0	0	7	7
No. 11 Utes	7	7	0	0	14

at Rice-Eccles Stadium • Salt Lake City, Utah

- Date: September 23
- Game time: 1:30 p.m. MST/12:30 p.m. PST
- Game weather: Sunny, 68 °F (20 °C)
- Game attendance: 52,919
- Referee: Mark Duddy
- TV announcers (FOX): Jason Benetti (play-by-play), Brock Huard (analyst), Allison Williams (sideline)

Game information

First quarter

- (14:48) UTAH – Karene Reid 21-yard interception return, Joey Cheek kick (Drive: 1 play, 0 yards, 0:07; Utah 7–0)

Second quarter

- (1:01) UTAH – Landen King 7-yard pass from Nate Johnson, Joey Cheek kick (Drive: 9 plays, 51 yards, 3:59; Utah 14–0)

Third quarter

None

Fourth quarter

- (3:39) UCLA – Josiah Norwood 17-yard pass from Dante Moore, R. J. Lopez kick (Drive: 9 plays, 91 yards, 4:29; Utah 14–7)

Statistics	UCLA	Utah
First downs	11	13
Plays–yards	243	219
Rushes–yards	32–9	48–102
Passing yards	234	117
Passing: comp–att–int	15–35–1	9–17–0
Turnovers		
Time of possession	25:32	34:28

Team	Category	Player	Statistics
UCLA	Passing	Dante Moore	15/35, 234 yards, TD, INT
UCLA	Rushing	TJ Harden	11 carries, 31 yards
UCLA	Receiving	Carsen Ryan	3 receptions, 69 yards
Utah	Passing	Nate Johnson	9/17, 117 yards, TD
Utah	Rushing	Jaylon Glover	25 carries, 86 yards
Utah	Receiving	Devaughn Vele	2 receptions, 57 yards

=== at No. 19 Oregon State ===
No. 10 Utah Utes (4–0) at No. 19 Oregon State Beavers (3–1) – Game summary

Quarter	1	2	3	4	Total
No. 10 Utes	0	0	0	7	7
No. 19 Beavers	7	0	7	7	21

at Reser Stadium • Corvallis, Oregon

- Date: September 29
- Game time: 7:00 p.m. MST/6:00 p.m. PST
- Game weather: Cloudy, 59 °F (15 °C)
- Game attendance: 37,372
- Referee: Jeff Dahle
- TV announcers (FS1): Tim Brando (play-by-play), Spencer Tillman (analyst)

Game information

First quarter

Second quarter

Third quarter

Fourth quarter

Statistics	Utah	Oregon State
First downs	14	15
Plays–yards	63–198	62–358
Rushes–yards	32–57	36–131
Passing yards	198	227
Passing: comp–att–int	13–31–1	15–26–1
Turnovers		
Time of possession	28:54	31:06

Team	Category	Player	Statistics
Utah	Passing	Nate Johnson	8/23, 101 yards, TD
Utah	Rushing	Jaylon Glover	16 carries, 58 yards
Utah	Receiving	Thomas Yassmin	3 receptions, 59 yards, TD
Oregon State	Passing	DJ Uiagalelei	14/25, 204 yards, TD, INT
Oregon State	Rushing	Damien Martinez	16 carries, 65 yards, TD
Oregon State	Receiving	Silas Bolden	6 receptions, 100 yards, TD

=== vs California ===
California Golden Bears (3–3) at No. 16 Utah Utes (4–1) – Game summary

Quarter	1	2	3	4	Total
Golden Bears	7	0	7	0	14
No. 16 Utes	0	14	10	10	34

at Rice-Eccles Stadium • Salt Lake City, Utah

- Date: October 14
- Game time: 1:00 p.m. MST/12:00 p.m. PST
- Game attendance: 52,115
- TV announcers (Pac-12 Network): Roxy Bernstein, Lincoln Kennedy

Game information

First quarter

Second quarter

Third quarter

Fourth quarter

Statistics	California	Utah
First downs	16	21
Plays–yards	55–254	75–445
Rushes–yards	24–66	53–317
Passing yards	188	128
Passing: comp–att–int	15–31–1	15–22–0
Turnovers		
Time of possession	22:07	37:53

Team	Category	Player	Statistics
California	Passing	Fernando Mendoza	10/17, 149 yards, 2 TD, INT
California	Rushing	Jaydn Ott	8 carries, 46 yards
California	Receiving	Taj Davis	7 receptions, 93 yards, TD
Utah	Passing	Bryson Barnes	15/21, 128 yards
Utah	Rushing	Sione Vaki	15 carries, 158 yards, 2 TD
Utah	Receiving	Mikey Matthews	7 receptions, 53 yards

=== at No. 18 USC ===
No. 14 Utah Utes (5–1) at No. 18 USC Trojans (5–1) – Game summary

Quarter	1	2	3	4	Total
No. 14 Utes	14	0	14	6	34
No. 18 Trojans	14	0	3	15	32

at Los Angeles Memorial Coliseum • Los Angeles, California

- Date: October 21
- Game time: 6:00 p.m. MST/5:00 p.m. PST
- Game weather: Sunny, 74 °F (23 °C)
- Game attendance: 61,551
- Referee: Mike McCabe
- TV announcers (FOX): Jason Benetti (play-by-play), Brock Huard (analyst), Allison Williams (sidelines)

Game information

First quarter

Second quarter

Third quarter

Fourth quarter

Statistics	Utah	USC
First downs	23	18
Plays–yards	70–482	58–401
Rushes–yards	47–247	23–145
Passing yards	235	256
Passing: comp–att–int	14–23–1	24–35–0
Turnovers		
Time of possession	34:42	25:18

Team	Category	Player	Statistics
Utah	Passing	Bryson Barnes	14/23, 235 yards, 3 TD, INT
Utah	Rushing	Ja'Quinden Jackson	26 carries, 117 yards
Utah	Receiving	Sione Vaki	5 receptions, 149 yards, 2 TD
USC	Passing	Caleb Williams	24/34, 256 yards
USC	Rushing	MarShawn Lloyd	7 carries, 86 yards, TD
USC	Receiving	Tahj Washington	5 receptions, 112 yards

=== vs No. 8 Oregon ===
No. 8 Oregon Ducks (6–1) at No. 13 Utah Utes (6–1) – Game summary

Quarter	1	2	3	4	Total
No. 8 Ducks	14	7	14	0	35
No. 13 Utes	3	3	0	0	6

at Rice-Eccles Stadium • Salt Lake City, Utah

- Date: October 28
- Game time: 1:30 p.m. MST/12:30 p.m. PST
- Game weather: Cloudy, 40 °F (4 °C), W 9 mph
- Game attendance: 53,586
- Referee: Mark Duddy
- TV announcers (FOX): Gus Johnson (play-by-play) and Joel Klatt (analyst)

Game information

First quarter

- (12:18) ORE – Bo Nix 1-yard run, Camden Lewis kick (Drive: 6 plays, 75 yards, 2:42; Oregon 7–0)
- (3:45) UTAH – Cole Becker 32-yard field goal (Drive: 7 plays, 13 yards, 3:21; Oregon 7–3)
- (0:18) ORE – Jordan James 18-yard pass from Bo Nix, Camden Lewis kick (Drive: 9 plays, 75 yards, 3:27; Oregon 14–3)

Second quarter

- (12:29) ORE – Troy Franklin 3-yard pass from Bo Nix, Camden Lewis kick (Drive: 5 plays, 30 yards, 2:25; Oregon 21–3)
- (0:00) UTAH – Cole Becker 30-yard field goal (Drive: 10 plays, 53 yards, 1:22; Oregon 21–6)

Third quarter

- (8:44) ORE – Bucky Irving 9-yard run, Camden Lewis kick (Drive: 12 plays, 76 yards, 4:15; Oregon 28–6)
- (6:08) ORE – Traeshon Holden 5-yard run, Camden Lewis kick (Drive: 5 plays, 52 yards, 2:19; Oregon 35–6)

Fourth quarter

No scoring plays

Statistics	Oregon	Utah
First downs	18	13
Plays–yards	58–390	66–241
Rushes–yards	27–142	36–99
Passing yards	248	142
Passing: comp–att–int	24–31–0	16–30–2
Turnovers		
Time of possession	28:03	31:57

Team	Category	Player	Statistics
Oregon	Passing	Bo Nix	24/31, 248 yards, 2 TD
Oregon	Rushing	Bucky Irving	14 carries, 83 yards, TD
Oregon	Receiving	Troy Franklin	8 receptions, 99 yards, TD
Utah	Passing	Bryson Barnes	15/29, 136 yards, 2 INT
Utah	Rushing	Jaylon Glover	9 carries, 39 yards
Utah	Receiving	Devaughn Vele	7 receptions, 80 yards

=== vs Arizona State ===
Arizona State Sun Devils (2–6) at No. 18 Utah Utes (6–2) – Game summary

Quarter	1	2	3	4	Total
Sun Devils	3	0	0	0	3
No. 18 Utes	14	10	10	21	55

at Rice-Eccles Stadium • Salt Lake City, Utah

- Date: November 4th
- Game time: 12:00 p.m. MST/11:00 a.m. PST
- Game weather: Sunny • Temperature: 61 °F (16 °C) • Wind: SW 4mph
- Game attendance: 52,104
- Referee: Justin Elliott
- TV announcers (P12N): JB Long, Lincoln Kennedy

Game information

First quarter

- (11:36) UTAH – Devaughn Vele 11-yard pass from Bryson Barnes, Cole Becker kick (Drive: 8 plays, 72 yards, 3:18; Utah 7–0)
- (6:37) UTAH – Devaughn Vele 3-yard pass from Bryson Barnes, Cole Becker kick (Drive: 8 plays, 65 yards, 3:38; Utah 14–0)
- (3:08) ASU – Dario Longhetto 35-yard field goal (Drive: 8 plays, 4 yards, 3:16; Utah 14–3)

Second quarter

- (4:05) UTAH – Cole Becker 30-yard field goal (Drive: 9 plays, 49 yards, 4:27; Utah 17–3)
- (0:54) UTAH – Munir McClain 20-yard pass from Bryson Barnes, Cole Becker kick (Drive: 10 plays, 68 yards, 1:41; Utah 24–3)

Third quarter

- (12:26) UTAH – Ja'Quinden Jackson 54-yard run, Cole Becker kick (Drive: 1 play, 54 yards, 0:09; Utah 31–3)
- (3:47) UTAH – Cole Becker 43-yard field goal (Drive: 4 plays, 3 yards, 2:16; Utah 34–3)

Fourth quarter

- (12:59) UTAH – Landen King 2-yard pass from Bryson Barnes, Cole Becker kick (Drive: 8 plays, 34 yards, 4:31; Utah 41–3)
- (11:04) UTAH – Nate Johnson 59-yard run, Cole Becker kick (Drive: 2 plays, 60 yards, 0:43; Utah 48–3)
- (0:08) UTAH – Charlie Vincent 22-yard run, Cole Becker kick (Drive: 7 plays, 44 yards, 4:32; Utah 55–3)

Statistics	Arizona State	Utah
First downs	6	26
Plays–yards	58–83	77–513
Rushes–yards	29–43	49–352
Passing yards	40	161
Passing: comp–att–int	8–29–1	19–28–0
Turnovers		
Time of possession	23:27	36:33

Team	Category	Player	Statistics
Arizona State	Passing	Jacob Conover	5/22, 41 yards, INT
Arizona State	Rushing	Cameron Skattebo	12 carries, 31 yards
Arizona State	Receiving	Giovanni Sanders	1 reception, 20 yards
Utah	Passing	Bryson Barnes	19/28, 161 yards, 4 TD
Utah	Rushing	Ja'Quinden Jackson	13 carries, 111 yards, TD
Utah	Receiving	Devaughn Vele	7 receptions, 56 yards, 2 TD

=== at No. 5 Washington ===
No. 18 Utah Utes (7–2) at No. 5 Washington Huskies (9–0) – Game summary

Quarter	1	2	3	4	Total
No. 18 Utes	7	21	0	0	28
No. 5 Huskies	10	14	11	0	35

at Husky Stadium • Seattle, Washington

- Date: November 11th
- Game time: 1:30 p.m. MST/12:30 p.m. PST
- Game weather: Cloudy, 52 °F (11 °C)
- Game attendance: 70,976
- Referee: Mike McCabe
- TV announcers (FOX): Jason Benetti, Brock Huard, Allison Williams

Game information

First quarter

Second quarter

Third quarter

Fourth quarter

Statistics	Utah	Washington
First downs	17	26
Plays–yards	57-382	75-457
Rushes–yards	27-115	33-125
Passing yards	267	332
Passing: comp–att–int	17-30-2	24-42-0
Turnovers		
Time of possession	25:02	34:58

Team	Category	Player	Statistics
Utah	Passing	B. Barnes	17-30, 267 Yds, 2 TD, 2 INT
Utah	Rushing	B. Barnes	6 Car, 39 Yds
Utah	Receiving	D. Vele	5 Rec, 145 Yds
Washington	Passing	M. Penix Jr.	24-42, 332 Yds, 2 TD
Washington	Rushing	D. Johnson	23 Car, 104 Yds, TD
Washington	Receiving	R. Odunze	3 Rec, 111 Yds, 2 TD

=== at No. 17 Arizona ===
No. 22 Utah Utes (7–3) at No. 17 Arizona Wildcats (7–3) – Game summary

Quarter	1	2	3	4	Total
No. 22 Utes	0	7	3	8	18
No. 17 Wildcats	21	7	0	14	42

at Arizona Stadium • Tucson, Arizona

- Date: November 18
- Game time: 12:30 p.m. MST/11:30 p.m. PST
- Game weather: Cloudy, 71 °F (22 °C)
- Game attendance: 50,800
- Referee: Jeff Dahle
- TV announcers (P12N): Ted Robinson, Yogi Roth

Game information

First quarter

- (10:33) ARIZ – Michael Wiley 21-yard pass from Tetairoa McMillan, Tyler Loop kick (Drive: 8 plays, 75 yards, 4:27; Arizona 7–0)
- (8:32) ARIZ – Anthony Ward 2-yard blocked punt return, Tyler Loop kick (Arizona 14–0)
- (4:06) ARIZ – Montana Lemonious-Craig 32-yard pass from Noah Fifita, Tyler Loop kick (Drive: 6 plays, 80 yards, 2:55; Arizona 21–0)

Second quarter

- (14:53) ARIZ – Michael Wiley 31-yard pass from Noah Fifita, Tyler Loop kick (Drive: 6 plays, 72 yards, 2:19; Arizona 28–0)
- (0:52) UTAH – Devaughn Vele 20-yard pass from Bryson Barnes, Cole Becker kick (Drive: 10 plays, 92 yards, 4:46; Arizona 28–7)

Third quarter

- (10:00) UTAH – Cole Becker 36-yard field goal (Drive: 12 plays, 57 yards, 5:00; Arizona 28–10)

Fourth quarter

- (7:57) ARIZ – Jonah Coleman 1-yard run, Tyler Loop kick (Drive: 7 plays, 61 yards, 3:25; Arizona 35–10)
- (0:43) UTAH – Munir McClain 2-yard pass from Bryson Barnes, Bryson Barnes run for two-point conversion (Drive: 14 plays, 88 yards, 2:44; Arizona 35–18)
- (0:32) ARIZ – Tetairoa McMillan 51-yard pass from Jayden de Laura, Tyler Loop kick (Drive: 1 play, 46 yards, 0:09; Arizona 42–18)

Statistics	Utah	Arizona
First downs	26	21
Plays–yards	–438	–443
Rushes–yards	37–118	24–118
Passing yards	320	325
Passing: comp–att–int	31–53–2	25–33–0
Turnovers		
Time of possession	35:34	24:26

Team	Category	Player	Statistics
Utah	Passing	Bryson Barnes	31/53, 320 yards, 2 TD, 2 INT
Utah	Rushing	Ja'Quinden Jackson	10 carries, 47 yards
Utah	Receiving	Devaughn Vele	9 receptions, 111 yards, TD
Arizona	Passing	Noah Fifita	22/30, 253 yards, 2 TD
Arizona	Rushing	Jonah Coleman	14 carries, 90 yards, TD
Arizona	Receiving	Tetairoa McMillan	8 receptions, 116 yards, TD

=== vs Colorado (rivalry) ===
Colorado Buffaloes (4–7) at Utah Utes (7–4) – Game summary
Rumble in the Rockies

Quarter	1	2	3	4	Total
Buffaloes	0	10	0	7	17
Utes	7	3	7	3	20

at Rice-Eccles Stadium • Salt Lake City, Utah

- Date: November 25
- Game time: 1:00 p.m. MST/12:00 p.m. PST
- Game weather: Cloudy, 35 °F (2 °C)
- Game attendance: 51,595
- Referee: Justin Elliott
- TV announcers (P12N): Roxy Bernstein (play-by-play), Lincoln Kennedy (analyst)

Game information

First quarter

- (4:03) UTAH – Luke Bottari 2-yard run, Cole Becker kick (Drive: 8 plays, 58 yards, 5:10; Utah 7–0)

Second quarter

- (11:17) UTAH – Cole Becker 34-yard field goal (Drive: 9 plays, 60 yards, 4:46; Utah 10–0)
- (8:17) COL – Dylan Edwards pass from Jimmy Horn Jr., Alejandro Mata kick (Drive: 5 plays, 59 yards, 2:50; Utah 10–7)
- (1:38) UTAH – Cole Becker 22-yard field goal (Drive: 11 plays, 61 yards, 6:39; Utah 13–7)
- (0:20) COL – Alejandro Mata 47-yard field goal (Drive: 8 plays, 52 yards, 1:12; Utah 13–10)

Third quarter

- (7:10) UTAH – Luke Bottari 1-yard run, Cole Becker kick (Drive: 8 plays, 62 yards, 4:27; Utah 20–10)

Fourth quarter

- (11:31) UTAH – Cole Becker 31-yard field goal (Drive: 14 plays, 56 yards, 8:25; Utah 23–10)
- (7:31) COL – Travis Hunter 18-yard pass from Ryan Staub, Alejandro Mata kick (Drive: 8 plays, 84 yards, 3:52; Utah 23–17)

Statistics	Colorado	Utah
First downs	13	22
Plays–yards	–262	–329
Rushes–yards	17–37	53–268
Passing yards	225	61
Passing: comp–att–int	18–25–0	6–10–0
Turnovers		
Time of possession	20:56	39:04

Team	Category	Player	Statistics
Colorado	Passing	Ryan Staub	17/24, 195 yards, TD
Colorado	Rushing	Sy'Veon Wilkerson	7 carries, 32 yards
Colorado	Receiving	Travis Hunter	8 receptions, 107 yards, TD
Utah	Passing	Luke Bottari	6/10, 61 yards
Utah	Rushing	Jaylon Glover	17 carries, 107 yards
Utah	Receiving	Mikey Matthews	2 receptions, 19 yards

=== vs Northwestern (Las Vegas Bowl) ===
Northwestern Wildcats (7–5) vs. Utah Utes (8–4) – Game summary
2023 Las Vegas Bowl

Quarter	1	2	3	4	Total
Utes	0	0	0	7	7
Wildcats	0	7	0	7	14

at Allegiant Stadium • Paradise, Nevada

- Date: December 23rd
- Game time: 5:30 p.m. MST/4:30 p.m. PST
- Game weather: N/A (indoor stadium)
- Game attendance: 20,897
- Referee: Kevin Boitmann
- TV announcers (ABC): Sean McDonough (play-by-play), Greg McElroy (analyst) and Stormy Buonantony (sideline)
- Box score

Game information

First quarter

No scoring plays

Second quarter

- NU – Camron Johnson 12-yard pass from Ben Bryant (Jack Olsen kick), 1:20. Wildcats 7–0. Drive: 8 plays, 78 yards, 2:22.

Third quarter

No scoring plays

Fourth quarter

- UTAH – Micah Bernard 6-yard run (Cole Becker kick), 12:38. Tied 7–7. Drive: 8 plays, 60 yards, 3:59.
- NU – Bryce Kirtz 19-yard pass from Ben Bryant (Jack Olsen kick), 6:19. Wildcats 14–7. Drive: 3 plays, 53 yards, 0:51.

Statistics	Utah	Northwestern
First downs	13	18
Plays–yards	65–211	70–290
Rushes–yards	51–138	31–65
Passing yards	73	225
Passing: comp–att–int	9–14–2	24–39–0
Turnovers		
Time of possession	34:21	25:39

Team	Category	Player	Statistics
Utah	Passing	Bryson Barnes	8/13, 55 yards, 2 INT
Utah	Rushing	Ja'Quinden Jackson	8 carries, 55 yards
Utah	Receiving	Micah Bernard	3 receptions, 24 yards
Northwestern	Passing	Ben Bryant	23/34, 222 yards, 2 TD
Northwestern	Rushing	Cam Porter	10 carries, 33 yards
Northwestern	Receiving	Bryce Kirtz	5 receptions, 68 yards, TD

== Rankings ==
Ranking movements Legend: ██ Increase in ranking ██ Decrease in ranking — = Not ranked RV = Received votes
	Week															
Poll	Pre	1	2	3	4	5	6	7	8	9	10	11	12	13	14	Final
AP	14	12	12	11	10	18	16	14	13	18	13	16	RV	RV	RV	—
Coaches	14	12	12	10	10	19	16	14	13	18	14	16	RV	RV	RV	—
CFP	Not released									18	18	22	—	—	—	Not released

== Roster ==
2023 Utah Utes football team roster
Players
Coaches
Offense

Pos.	#	Name	Class
WR	0	Mikey Matthews	Fr
QB	0	Steve Smedley	Fr
RB	1	Jaylon Glover	So
RB	2	Micah Bernard	Jr
RB	3	Ja'Quinden Jackson	So
WR	4	Munir McClain	Jr
WR	5	Mycah Pittman	Sr
WR	6	Daidren Zipperer	Fr
QB	7	Cameron Rising	Sr
QB	8	Brandon Rose	Fr
QB	9	Mack Howard	Fr
WR	10	Money Parks	Jr
WR	11	Makai Cope	So
QB	13	Nate Johnson	Fr
QB	15	Luke Bottari	Sr
QB	16	Bryson Barnes	Jr
WR	17	Devaughn Vele	Jr
WR	18	Emery Simmons	Sr
WR	19	Luca Caldarella	Jr
WR	20	Jett Meine	Fr
RB	21	Mike Mitchell	Fr
RB	24	Chris Curry	Sr
RB	25	John Randle Jr.	Fr
RB	26	Charlie Vincent	Jr
RB	27	Daniel Wood	Fr
RB	30	Dijon Stanley	Fr
RB	33	Hunter Schroeder	Fr
WR	37	Peyton Rice	Fr
WR	45	Kaimana Hanohano	Fr
TE	46	Hayden Erickson	So
TE	47	Miki Suguturaga	Jr
TE	48	Luke Tucker	Fr
OL	51	Keaton Bills	Jr
OL	52	Michael Mokofisi	So
OL	53	Johnny Maea	Sr
OL	55	Spencer Fano	Fr
OL	59	Falcon Kaumatule	Jr
OL	60	Shintaro Mann	Jr
OL	61	Kolinu'u Faaiu	So
OL	62	Solatao Moeai	Fr
OL	64	Jacob Edmonds	Fr
OL	66	Hunter Deuel	Fr
OL	68	Jaren Kump	So
OL	71	Caleb Lomu	Fr
OL	72	Isaia Thompson	Fr
OL	73	Tanoa Togiai	So
OL	74	Keith Olson	Fr
OL	75	Roger Alderman	Fr
OL	76	Zereoue Williams	So
OL	78	Sataoa Laumea	Jr
OL	79	Alex Harrison	Jr
TE	80	Brant Kuithe	Sr
TE	82	Landen King	So
WR	83	Brandon Bethel	Fr
WR	84	Sidney Mbanasor	Fr
TE	85	Cody Christensen	Fr
TE	86	CJ Jacobsen	Fr
TE	87	Thomas Yassmin	Sr
TE	88	Dallen Bentley	So
WR	89	Noah Bennee	So

Defense

Pos.	#	Name	Class
DE	0	Logan Fano	Fr
CB	1	Miles Battle	Sr
CB	2	Kenzel Lawler	So
LB	3	Levani Damuni	Jr
CB	4	JaTravis Broughton	Sr
CB	5	Zemaiah Vaughn	Jr
LB	6	Justin Medlock	Fr
DE	7	Van Fillinger	Jr
S	8	Cole Bishop	Jr
CB	9	Elijah Davis	Fr
LB	12	Sione Fotu	Fr
DE	13	Chase Kennedy	Fr
LB	14	Josh Calvert	Jr
CB	15	Tao Johnson	Fr
CB	16	CJ Blocker	Fr
CB	17	Smith Snowden	Fr
S	18	Briton Allen	Jr
S	19	Bryson Reeves	Jr
LB	20	Lander Barton	So
LB	21	Karene Reid	Jr
CB	23	Faybian Marks	Jr
S	24	Bleu Stewart	So
CB	25	Nick Howe	So
S	28	Sione Vaki	So
S	29	Johnathan Hall	Fr
S	29	Austin Keetch	Fr
S	30	Ben Durham	Fr
S	31	Nate Ritchie	Fr
DE	32	Helaman Ofahengaue	Fr
CB	33	Jocelyn Malaska	Fr
CB	34	Xane Uipi	Fr
S	38	Brock Nowatzke	Fr
S	39	Jadon Pearson	Jr
DE	43	Gavin Nawahine	So
LB	44	Hayden Furey	Sr
LB	45	Spencer Clegg	Fr
LB	49	Jason Saosi	Sr
DT	50	Austin LaRue	Fr
DT	52	Bobby Piland Jr.	Fr
LB	54	Owen Chambliss	Fr
LB	54	Shay O'Kelly	Fr
DE	56	Ka'eo Akana	Fr
DT	57	Keanu Tanuvasa	Fr
DT	58	Junior Tafuna	Jr
DT	77	Simote Pepa	So
DE	81	Connor O'Toole	Jr
DE	83	Jonah Elliss	Jr
LB	90	Vili Taufatofua	So
DT	91	Jori Benson	So
DE	91	Jonah Lea'ea	Fr
DT	92	James LeBaron	Fr
DT	94	Nifai Tonga	Fr
DT	95	Aliki Vimahi	Jr
DT	99	Tevita Fotu	So

Special teams

Pos.	#	Name	Class
P	34	Jack Bouwmeester	So
K	36	Cole Becker	Jr
P	40	Nathan Price	So
LS	50	Justice Brusatto	So
LS	57	J. T. Greep	Jr
K	63	Tanner Cragun	So
LS	65	Logan Castor	Fr
K	67	Chase Carter	Sr
K	97	Joey Cheek	Fr

Head coach

- Kyle Whittingham

Coordinators/assistant coaches

- Morgan Scalley – Defensive coordinator/safeties
- Andy Ludwig – Offensive coordinator/quarterbacks
- Jim Harding – Assistant head coach/offensive line
- Sharrieff Shah – Special teams coordinator/cornerbacks
- Freddie Whittingham – Recruiting coordinator/tight ends
- Lewis Powell – Defensive ends
- Luther Elliss – Defensive tackles
- Colton Swan – Linebackers
- Alvis Whitted – Wide receivers
- Quinton Ganther – Running backs
- Josh Crawford – Offensive graduate assistant
- Chase Murdock – Defensive graduate assistant
- Quincy Watkins – Defensive graduate assistant
- Ryan Blakney – Offensive analyst
- Vince Conti – Defensive analyst
- Dom Conti – Special teams analyst
- Doug Elisaia – Director, strength and conditioning
- Robert Blechen – Director, personnel coordinator
- Adam Fry – Director, football operations
- Jeff Rudy – Associate director for football administration

Legend

- (C) Team captain
- (S) Suspended
- (I) Ineligible
- Injured
- Redshirt

Roster
Last update: 11/17/23
