= Saturday Night Football =

American sports television program

- Current SNF logo, in use since 2025
- Genre: American college football game telecasts
- Directed by: Jimmy Platt
- Presented by: Commentators: Chris Fowler (play-by-play); Kirk Herbstreit (color commentator); Reporters: Holly Rowe (sideline); Laura Rutledge (sideline, select games); Rules analyst: Matt Austin; Steve Shaw; Studio: Kevin Negandhi; Booger McFarland; Jordan Rodgers
- Theme music composer: John Colby (main theme); Bob Christianson (SEC home games only)
- Opening theme: ESPN College Football theme (main theme); SEC on ABC theme (SEC home games only)
- Ending theme: Same as opening
- Country of origin: United States
- Original language: English
- No. of seasons: 21 (through 2026 season)
- No. of episodes: 337

Production
- Producer: Bill Bonnell
- Production locations: Various NCAA stadiums (game telecasts); ESPN Headquarters; Bristol, Connecticut, U.S. (pre-game, halftime and post-game shows); ABC and ESPN Studio; 7 Hudson Square, Manhattan, New York City (alternate pre-game, halftime and post-game shows)
- Camera setup: Multi-camera
- Running time: 210 minutes or until game ends (inc. adverts)
- Production companies: National Collegiate Athletic Association; ESPN

Original release
- Network: ABC
- Release: September 2, 2006 – present

Related
- College Football Countdown; College Football on ABC; College GameDay

Saturday Night Football (currently branded as ABC Saturday Night Football presented by Capital One for sponsorship reasons) is an American weekly presentation of prime time broadcasts of National Collegiate Athletic Association (NCAA) Division I Football Bowl Subdivision (FBS) college football games that are produced by ESPN and televised on ABC. Games are presented each Saturday evening starting at 7:30 p.m. Eastern Time/6:30 p.m. Central Time during the college football regular season, which has been the case since 2017 (some weeks until 2015 saw no game on ABC, due to Saturday evening Sprint Cup Series NASCAR coverage or to avoid competition with the World Series; ESPN would then carry that week's high-profile game instead, with ESPN2 carrying a secondary game usually seen on ESPN/ABC). Saturday Night Football began in 2006 as both ESPN and ABC are owned by The Walt Disney Company. It is typically ESPN's biggest game of the week and in most cases (outside where other networks carry the game), the city and/or campus of that night's game will host College GameDay.

As of 2026, the primary broadcast team for the majority of the games includes play-by-play announcer Chris Fowler and analyst Kirk Herbstreit with Holly Rowe and Laura Rutledge as sideline reporters. Kevin Negandhi and Booger McFarland host the halftime show with Jordan Rodgers joining them in the studio. Negandhi also provides in game updates throughout the game. Other ESPN broadcast teams may also occasionally appear for regional (and some national) telecasts.

== Overview ==
Saturday Night Football premiered on September 2, 2006, with a game between the Notre Dame Fighting Irish and Georgia Tech Yellow Jackets. While ABC and ESPN have aired college football games on Saturday nights for decades, it was the first presentation of college football intentionally scheduled as part of a major broadcast television network's primetime.

Twelve weeks of regular season games were televised during the three-month college football season in 2006, 2007 and from 2009 to 2011; the Dr. Pepper Big 12 Football Championship Game closing out each season until a conference realignment in which four university football programs left and two others joined the Big 12 Conference resulted in the Championship Game being discontinued after the 2010 event (the Big 12 Football Championship Game returned in 2017, however, it did not return to ABC until 2018, when the network aired the game in the afternoon instead of in primetime). With the college football season being extended by one week, ABC televised thirteen weeks of games in 2008, closing with the 2008 Big 12 Championship Game on December 6. With the loss of the Sprint Cup Series to NBC and NBCSN, Saturday Night Football expanded its seasonal game schedule full-time to 13 weeks beginning in 2015, starting with the Advocare Classic.

Games from the Atlantic Coast Conference, the Big 12 Conference, the old Big East Conference, the Big Ten Conference, the Pac-12 Conference, the now-defunct Western Athletic Conference and the American Athletic Conference have aired on Saturday Night Football, as well as non-conference games in which teams from these conferences were either playing at home or a neutral-site game to which ABC holds the television rights. All BCS/CFP and Power 5 conferences have appeared on Saturday Night Football, as the Southeastern Conference has had its teams featured in 23 non-conference games. Boise State, Utah State, BYU, Temple, UConn, UCF, Cincinnati, SMU, Tulsa, and Memphis are the only Group of 5 teams to be featured on Saturday Night Football to date, with the latter four teams being featured when they were members of the BCS-aligned Big East or American Athletic Conference.

In recent years, following the loss of some broadcast rights of the Pac-12 Conference to Fox Sports in 2012, the Pac-12's Saturday Night Football appearances have been limited, sometimes including home games against Notre Dame and games against the Southeastern Conference, as well as road games against conferences that still have broadcast rights with ABC.

Besides Pac-12 and Big Ten games, ABC makes most of its game broadcast selections or options twelve days prior to the game (with some being made six days beforehand). This allows ABC to 'flex' the most compelling game it has the rights to broadcast into the Saturday Night Football slot. As a result, the Saturday night game is usually ABC's "game of the week".

With ESPN's acquisition of its top football package beginning in 2024, Southeastern Conference home games began to be featured on Saturday Night Football on ABC for the first time that season. As with afternoon games, SEC home games on Saturday Night Football utilize the distinct SEC on ABC graphics and theme music.

The Cowboys Kickoff Classic had become the opening game for Saturday Night Football beginning in 2011; however in 2013, the matchup between the Georgia Bulldogs and Clemson Tigers served as the opening game with the Classic matchup between LSU and TCU being broadcast on ESPN. The Classic served as the opening game for Saturday Night Football again in 2014, 2015, and in 2016. In 2017, the Chick-fil-A Kickoff Game, which had served as the opening game for Saturday Night Football from 2008 to 2010, served as the opening game in 2017, while the Advocare Classic aired in the 3:30 ET timeslot. In 2018, the new Camping World Kickoff served as the Saturday Night Football season premiere, while the Advocare Classic aired the next night in primetime. The Advocare Classic returned to Saturday Night Football in 2019. Since then, each season of Saturday Night Football has started with an on-campus game, the Duke's Mayo Classic in Charlotte, NC in Week 1, or, since 2023, the MEAC/SWAC Challenge in Atlanta during Week 0.

== Schedules ==
All rankings are from that week's AP Poll, and that week's CFP rankings since 2014.

=== 2006 schedule ===
ABC did not air games on either October 21 or October 28 to avoid competing with the World Series.

Date	Away	Home	Notes
September 2	#2 Notre Dame 14	Georgia Tech 10	Series Premiere of Saturday Night Football; College GameDay
September 9	#1 Ohio State 24	#2 Texas 7	2005 Week 2 rematch College GameDay
September 16	#19 Nebraska 10	#4 USC 28	College GameDay
September 23	#12 Notre Dame 40	Michigan State 37	Michigan State-Notre Dame rivalry Split-national (79% of the United States)
September 23	#3 USC 20	Arizona 3	Split-national (21% of the United States)
September 30	#1 Ohio State 38	#13 Iowa 17	College GameDay
October 7	#11 Oregon 24	#16 California 45	Split-national (62% of the United States)
October 7	#22 Nebraska 28	Iowa State 14	Iowa State-Nebraska rivalry Split-national (38% of the United States)
October 14	#4 Michigan 17	Penn State 10	Michigan-Penn State rivalry Split-national (79% of the United States)
October 14	Arizona State 21	#3 USC 28	Split-national (21% of the United States)
November 4	#18 Oklahoma 17	#21 Texas A&M 16	Split-national (43% of the United States); College GameDay
November 4	#23 Virginia Tech 17	Miami (Fla.) 10	Miami-Virginia Tech rivalry Split-national (38% of the United States, no HD)
November 4	UCLA 24	#10 California 38	California-UCLA rivalry Split-national (19% of the United States)
November 11	#4 Texas 42	Kansas State 45	Split-national (56% of the United States)
November 11	#18 Wake Forest 30	Florida State 0	Split-national (44% of the United States)
November 18	#17 California 9	#4 USC 23	
November 25	#6 Notre Dame 24	#3 USC 44	Jeweled Shillelagh; College GameDay
December 2	#19 Nebraska 7	#8 Oklahoma 21	Big 12 Championship Game; Nebraska-Oklahoma rivalry

=== 2007 schedule ===
ABC did not air games on either September 8 or October 13 due to broadcasts of NASCAR NEXTEL Cup Series races.

Date	Away	Home	Notes
September 1	#15 Tennessee 31	#12 California 45	
September 15	#1 USC 49	#14 Nebraska 31	College GameDay
September 22	Washington State 14	#1 USC 47	Split-national (61% of the United States)
September 22	Iowa 13	#9 Wisconsin 17	Heartland Trophy; Split-national (39% of the United States)
September 29	#1 USC 27	Washington 24	
October 6	#4 Ohio State 23	#23 Purdue 7	Split-national (83% of the United States)
October 6	Notre Dame 20	UCLA 6	Split-national (17% of the United States)
October 20	#24 Michigan 27	Illinois 17	
October 27	#1 Ohio State 37	#24 Penn State 17	Ohio State-Penn State rivalry College GameDay
November 3	Florida State 27	#2 Boston College 17	Split-national (62% of the United States)
November 3	Texas A&M 14	#5 Oklahoma 42	Split-national (20% of the United States, no HD)
November 3	Oregon State 3	#13 USC 24	Split-national (18% of the United States)
November 10	#5 Kansas 43	Oklahoma State 28	Split-national (63% of the United States)
November 10	#8 Boston College 35	Maryland 42	Split-national (19% of the United States, no HD)
November 10	#12 USC 24	#24 California 17	Split-national (18% of the United States)
November 17	#3 Oklahoma 27	Texas Tech 34	
November 24	#3 Missouri 36	#2 Kansas 28	Border Showdown; College GameDay
December 1	#9 Oklahoma 38	#1 Missouri 17	Big 12 Championship Game; Missouri-Oklahoma rivalry College GameDay

=== 2008 schedule ===
ABC did not air games on either September 6 or October 11 due to broadcasts of NASCAR Sprint Cup Series races.

Date	Away	Home	Notes
August 30	#24 Alabama 34	#9 Clemson 10	Chick-fil-A Kickoff Game; Alabama-Clemson rivalry Split-national (71% of the United States); College GameDay
August 30	Michigan State 31	California 38	Split-national (29% of the United States)
September 13	#5 Ohio State 3	#1 USC 35	College GameDay
September 20	#3 Georgia 27	Arizona State 10	
September 27	#22 Illinois 24	#12 Penn State 38	Split-national (70% of the United States)
September 27	Virginia Tech 35	Nebraska 30	Split-national (30% of the United States)
October 4	#14 Ohio State 20	#18 Wisconsin 17	Split-national (63% of the United States)
October 4	#23 Oregon 10	#9 USC 44	Split-national (37% of the United States)
October 18	#11 Missouri 31	#1 Texas 56	College GameDay
October 25	#3 Penn State 13	#10 Ohio State 6	Ohio State-Penn State rivalry College GameDay
November 1	#1 Texas 33	#6 Texas Tech 39	Texas-Texas Tech rivalry College GameDay
November 8	#8 Oklahoma State 20	#2 Texas Tech 56	Split-national (82% of the United States)
November 8	#21 California 3	#7 USC 17	Split-national (18% of the United States)
November 15	Boston College 27	#20 Florida State 17	Split-national (80% of the United States)
November 15	#11 Oklahoma State 30	Colorado 17	Split-national (20% of the United States)
November 22	#2 Texas Tech 21	#5 Oklahoma 65	College GameDay
November 29	#3 Oklahoma 61	#11 Oklahoma State 41	Bedlam Series; College GameDay
December 6	#19 Missouri 21	#4 Oklahoma 62	Big 12 Championship Game; Missouri-Oklahoma rivalry

=== 2009 schedule ===
ABC did not air games on either September 12 or October 17 due to broadcasts of NASCAR Sprint Cup Series races.

Date	Away	Home	Notes
September 5	#5 Alabama 34	#7 Virginia Tech 24	Chick-fil-A Kickoff Game; College GameDay
September 19	Texas Tech 24	#2 Texas 34	Texas-Texas Tech rivalry College GameDay; 2008 Week 10 Rematch
September 26	Iowa 21	#5 Penn State 10	College GameDay
October 3	#8 Oklahoma 20	#17 Miami (Fla.) 21	Split-national (81% of the United States)
October 3	#7 USC 30	#24 California 3	Split-national (19% of the United States)
October 10	Michigan 28	#12 Iowa 30	
October 24	#3 Texas 41	Missouri 7	Split-national (81% of the United States)
October 24	Oregon State 36	#4 USC 42	Split-national (19% of the United States)
October 31	#4 USC 20	#10 Oregon 47	Split-national (54% of the United States, with SD reverse mirror on ESPN2); College GameDay
October 31	#3 Texas 41	#13 Oklahoma State 14	Split-national (46% of the United States, with SD reverse mirror on ESPN2); This marked the first time that the "reverse mirror" was used in primetime
November 7	Connecticut 45	#4 Cincinnati 47	Split-national (46% of the United States)
November 7	#20 Oklahoma 3	Nebraska 10	Nebraska-Oklahoma rivalry Split-national (35% of the United States)
November 7	#12 USC 14	Arizona State 9	Split-national (19% of the United States)
November 14	Notre Dame 22	#8 Pittsburgh 27	Notre Dame-Pittsburgh rivalry Split-national (83% of the United States)
November 14	Texas Tech 17	#17 Oklahoma State 24	Split-national (17% of the United States)
November 21	#11 Oregon 44	Arizona 41 (2OT)	Split-national (65% of the United States); College GameDay
November 21	Kansas 20	#3 Texas 51	Split-national (35% of the United States)
November 28	Notre Dame 38	Stanford 45	Notre Dame-Stanford rivalry Split-national (74% of the United States, with SD reverse mirror on ESPN2)
November 28	Georgia 30	#7 Georgia Tech 24	Clean, Old-Fashioned Hate; Split-national (26% of the United States, with reverse mirror on ESPN2)
December 5	#3 Texas 13	#21 Nebraska 12	Big 12 Championship Game

=== 2010 schedule ===
ABC did not air games on either September 11 or October 16 due to broadcasts of NASCAR Sprint Cup Series races.

Date	Away	Home	Notes
September 4	#21 LSU 30	#18 North Carolina 24	Chick-fil-A Kickoff Game; College GameDay
September 18	#6 Texas 24	Texas Tech 14	Texas-Texas Tech rivalry Split-national (54% of the United States, with SD reverse mirror on ESPN2)
September 18	Notre Dame 31	Michigan State 34 (OT)	Michigan State-Notre Dame rivalry Split-national (46% of the United States, with reverse mirror on ESPN2)
September 25	#24 Oregon State 24	#3 Boise State 37	College GameDay
October 2	#9 Stanford 31	#4 Oregon 52	Oregon-Stanford rivalry Split-national (53% of the United States, with SD reverse mirror on ESPN2); College GameDay
October 2	Notre Dame 31	Boston College 13	Holy War; Split-national (47% of the United States)
October 9	#23 Florida State 45	#13 Miami (Fla.) 17	Florida State-Miami rivalry Florida Cup; Split-national (79% of the United States)
October 9	USC 35	#16 Stanford 37	Stanford-USC rivalry Split-national (21% of the United States)
October 23	#3 Oklahoma 27	#18 Missouri 36	Missouri-Oklahoma rivalry College GameDay
October 30	#1 Oregon 53	#24 USC 32	Split-national (79% of the United States); College GameDay
October 30	#10 Ohio State 52	Minnesota 10	Split-national (21% of the United States)
November 6	#13 Arizona 17	#10 Stanford 42	Split-national (82% of the United States)
November 6	#14 Missouri 17	Texas Tech 24	Split-national (18% of the United States)
November 13	#12 Oklahoma State 33	Texas 16	Split-national (61% of the United States)
November 13	Clemson 13	Florida State 16	Clemson-Florida State rivalry Split-national (20% of the United States)
November 13	USC 24	#18 Arizona 21	Split-national (19% of the United States)
November 20	#9 Nebraska 6	#18 Texas A&M 9	Split-national (53% of the United States)
November 20	Florida State 30	Maryland 16	Split-national (28% of the United States)
November 20	#20 USC 7	Oregon State 36	Split-national (19% of the United States)
November 27	#14 Oklahoma 47	#10 Oklahoma State 41	Bedlam Series; Split-national (54% of the United States); College GameDay
November 27	Notre Dame 20	USC 16	Jeweled Shillelagh; Split-national (46% of the United States)
December 4	#10 Oklahoma 23	#13 Nebraska 20	Big 12 Championship Game; Nebraska-Oklahoma rivalry Final Big 12 Championship Game until 2017

=== 2011 schedule ===
Notes:

- 1) ABC did not air games on either September 10 or October 15 due to broadcasts of NASCAR Sprint Cup Series races.
- 2) Many of the markets scheduled to receive the Texas Tech–Oklahoma game on October 22 instead saw Washington–Stanford, as a thunderstorm delayed the start of the game, and most affiliates stuck with the latter even after the storm cleared. The Texas Tech–Oklahoma game was seen on ESPN2 after the Alabama-Tennessee game, Except in Big 12 markets, where it aired on ABC.

Date	Away	Home	Notes
September 3	#3 Oregon 27	#4 LSU 40	Cowboys Classic; College GameDay
September 17	#1 Oklahoma 23	#5 Florida State 13	College GameDay
September 24	#2 LSU 47	#16 West Virginia 21	College GameDay
October 1	#8 Nebraska 17	#7 Wisconsin 48	Nebraska-Wisconsin rivalry College GameDay; Nebraska's first conference game as a member of the Big Ten
October 8	Ohio State 27	#14 Nebraska 34	
October 22	Texas Tech 41	#3 Oklahoma 38	Split-national
October 22	#22 Washington 21	#7 Stanford 65	Split-national
October 29	#4 Stanford 56	#20 USC 48 (3OT)	Stanford-USC rivalry Split-national; College GameDay
October 29	#6 Clemson 17	Georgia Tech 31	Split-national
November 5	#17 Kansas State 45	#3 Oklahoma State 52	Split-national (with reverse mirror on ESPN2)
November 5	Notre Dame 24	Wake Forest 17	Split-national (with reverse mirror on ESPN2)
November 12	#6 Oregon 53	#3 Stanford 30	Oregon-Stanford rivalry College GameDay
November 19	#18 USC 38	#4 Oregon 35	Split-national
November 19	#5 Oklahoma 38	#25 Baylor 45	Split-national
November 26	#22 Notre Dame 14	#4 Stanford 28	Notre Dame–Stanford rivalry
December 3	#13 Oklahoma 10	#3 Oklahoma State 44	Bedlam Series

=== 2012 schedule ===
ABC did not air Games on either September 8 or October 13 due to broadcasts of NASCAR Sprint Cup Series races.

Date	Away	Home	Notes
September 1	#8 Michigan 14	#2 Alabama 41	Cowboys Classic; College GameDay; 2000 Orange Bowl Rematch
September 15	#20 Notre Dame 20	#10 Michigan State 3	Michigan State–Notre Dame rivalry
September 22	#10 Clemson 37	#4 Florida State 49	Clemson–Florida State rivalry College GameDay
September 29	Wisconsin 27	#22 Nebraska 30	Nebraska–Wisconsin rivalry
October 6	#21 Nebraska 38	#12 Ohio State 63	
October 20	#12 Florida State 33	Miami 20	Florida State-Miami rivalry Florida Cup; Split-national
October 20	Baylor 50	#25 Texas 56	Baylor–Texas rivalry Split-national
October 27	#5 Notre Dame 30	#8 Oklahoma 13	College GameDay
November 3	#24 Oklahoma State 30	#2 Kansas State 44	
November 10	#4 Notre Dame 21	Boston College 6	Holy War
November 17	#13 Stanford 17	#1 Oregon 14 (OT)	Oregon-Stanford rivalry College GameDay
November 24	#1 Notre Dame 22	USC 13	Jeweled Shillelagh; College GameDay
December 1	#18 Texas 24	#6 Kansas State 42	

=== 2013 schedule ===
ABC did not air Games on either September 7 or October 12 due to broadcasts of NASCAR Sprint Cup Series races.

Date	Away	Home	Notes
August 31	#5 Georgia 35	#8 Clemson 38	Clemson-Georgia rivalry College GameDay
September 14	#21 Notre Dame 31	Purdue 24	Notre Dame-Purdue rivalry
September 21	#15 Michigan 24	Connecticut 21	Split-national
September 21	Kansas State 21	Texas 31	Split-national
September 28	#23 Wisconsin 24	#4 Ohio State 31	
October 5	#4 Ohio State 40	#16 Northwestern 30	College GameDay
October 19	#5 Florida State 51	#3 Clemson 14	Clemson-Florida State rivalry College GameDay
October 26	Penn State 14	#4 Ohio State 63	Ohio State-Penn State rivalry
November 2	#7 Miami 14	#3 Florida State 41	Florida State-Miami rivalry Florida Cup; College GameDay
November 9	#24 Notre Dame 21	Pittsburgh 28	Notre Dame-Pittsburgh rivalry
November 16	#5 Stanford 17	USC 20	Stanford-USC rivalry College GameDay
November 23	#4 Baylor 17	#12 Oklahoma State 49	College GameDay
November 30	#22 UCLA 35	#23 USC 14	Victory Bell
December 7	#22 Duke 7	#1 Florida State 45	2013 ACC Championship Game

=== 2014 schedule ===
ABC did not air games on either September 6 or October 11 due to broadcasts of NASCAR Sprint Cup Series races.

Date	Away	Home	Notes
August 30	#1 Florida State 37	Oklahoma State 31	Cowboys Classic; College GameDay
September 13	Tennessee 10	#4 Oklahoma 34	
September 20	#22 Clemson 17	#1 Florida State 23 (OT)	Florida State-Clemson rivalry College GameDay
September 27	#8 Notre Dame 31	Syracuse 15	
October 4	#19 Nebraska 22	#10 Michigan State 27	
October 18	#5 Notre Dame 27	#2 Florida State 31	College GameDay
October 25	#13 Ohio State 31	Penn State 24 (2OT)	Ohio State-Penn State rivalry
November 1	Illinois 14	#16 Ohio State 55	Illibuck; Split-national (78% of the United States)
November 1	Oklahoma State 14	#9 Kansas State 48	Split-national (22% of the United States)
November 8	#14 Ohio State 49	#8 Michigan State 37	College GameDay
November 15	#3 Florida State 30	Miami 26	Florida State-Miami rivalry Florida Cup
November 22	USC 20	#9 UCLA 38	Victory Bell
November 29	#2 Oregon 47	Oregon State 19	Civil War
December 6	#4 Florida State 37	#11 Georgia Tech 35	2014 ACC Championship Game

=== 2015 schedule ===
Date	Away	Home	Notes
September 5	#20 Wisconsin 17	#3 Alabama 35	Advocare Classic; College GameDay
September 12	#7 Oregon 28	#5 Michigan State 31	College GameDay; 2014 Week 2 rematch
September 19	Stanford 41	#6 USC 31	Stanford-USC rivalry
September 26	#9 UCLA 56	#16 Arizona 30	College GameDay
October 3	#6 Notre Dame 22	#12 Clemson 24	College GameDay
October 10	Miami 24	#12 Florida State 29	Miami-Florida State rivalry Florida Cup
October 17	Penn State 10	#1 Ohio State 38	Ohio State-Penn State rivalry
October 24	#1 Ohio State 49	Rutgers 7	
October 31	#9 Notre Dame 24	#21 Temple 20	College GameDay
November 7	Minnesota 14	#3 Ohio State 28	
November 14	#12 Oklahoma 44	#6 Baylor 34	College GameDay
November 21	#18 TCU 29	#7 Oklahoma 30	
November 28	#3 Oklahoma 58	#11 Oklahoma State 23	College GameDay; Bedlam Series
December 5	#10 North Carolina 37	#1 Clemson 45	2015 ACC Championship Game

=== 2016 schedule ===
Date	Away	Home	Notes
September 3	#20 USC 6	#1 Alabama 52	Advocare Classic
September 10	Virginia Tech 24	#17 Tennessee 45	Battle at Bristol; College GameDay
September 17	USC 10	#7 Stanford 27	2015 Pac-12 Championship Game Rematch; Stanford-USC rivalry
September 24	#7 Stanford 22	UCLA 13	
October 1	#3 Louisville 36	#5 Clemson 42	College GameDay
October 8	#23 Florida State 20	#10 Miami 19	Florida State-Miami rivalry Florida Cup
October 15	#2 Ohio State 30	#8 Wisconsin 23 (OT)	College GameDay
October 22	#2 Ohio State 21	Penn State 24	Ohio State-Penn State rivalry
October 29	#3 Clemson 37	#12 Florida State 34	Clemson-Florida State rivalry
November 5	#9 Nebraska 3	#6 Ohio State 62	
November 12	#3 Michigan 13	Iowa 14	
November 19	#8 Oklahoma 56	#10 West Virginia 28	
November 26	#13 Florida 13	#15 Florida State 31	Florida-Florida State rivalry Florida Cup
December 3	#3 Clemson 42	#19 Virginia Tech 35	2016 ACC Championship Game

=== 2017 schedule ===
Beginning this season, all games involving Big Ten teams started at 7:30 ET.

Date	Away	Home	Notes
September 2	#3 Florida State 7	#1 Alabama 24	Chick-fil-A Kickoff Game; College GameDay
September 9	#5 Oklahoma 31	#2 Ohio State 16	7:30 ET kickoff College GameDay
September 16	#3 Clemson 47	#14 Louisville 21	2016 Week 5 Rematch; Originally scheduled to be Miami/Florida State; postponed due to Hurricane Irma; College GameDay
September 23	#4 Penn State 21	Iowa 19	7:30 ET kickoff
September 30	#2 Clemson 31	#12 Virginia Tech 17	2016 ACC Championship Game Rematch; College GameDay
October 7	Michigan State 14	#7 Michigan 10	7:30 ET kickoff Paul Bunyan Trophy
October 14	Utah 27	#13 USC 28	
October 21	#19 Michigan 13	#2 Penn State 42	7:30 ET kickoff College GameDay; Michigan–Penn State rivalry
October 28	Georgia Tech 10	#7 Clemson 24	Split-national with reverse mirror on ESPN2 (Last split-national primetime telecast, to date).
October 28	Texas Tech 27	#10 Oklahoma 49	Split-national with reverse mirror on ESPN2 (Last split-national primetime telecast, to date).
November 4	#13 Virginia Tech 10	#9 Miami 28	Miami-Virginia Tech rivalry
November 11	#3 Notre Dame 8	#7 Miami 41	College GameDay; Catholics vs. Convicts
November 18	UCLA 23	#12 USC 28	Victory Bell
November 25	#9 Notre Dame 20	#20 Stanford 38	Notre Dame–Stanford rivalry
December 2	#7 Miami 3	#1 Clemson 38	2017 ACC Championship Game; College GameDay

=== 2018 schedule ===
Date	Away	Home	Notes
September 1	#1 Alabama 51	Louisville 14	Camping World Kickoff
September 8	#13 Penn State 51	Pittsburgh 6	Penn State-Pitt rivalry
September 15	#4 Ohio State 40	#15 TCU 28	Game played at AT&T Stadium; College GameDay
September 22	#7 Stanford 38	#20 Oregon 31 (OT)	College GameDay
September 29	#4 Ohio State 27	#9 Penn State 26	7:30 ET kickoff College GameDay; Ohio State-Penn State rivalry
October 6	#6 Notre Dame 45	#24 Virginia Tech 23	Notre Dame's first visit to Lane Stadium
October 13	#15 Wisconsin 13	#12 Michigan 38	7:30 ET kickoff College GameDay
October 20	#2 Ohio State 20	Purdue 49	7:30 ET kickoff
October 27	#6 Texas 35	Oklahoma State 38	
November 3	#7 Oklahoma 51	Texas Tech 46	
November 10	#2 Clemson 27	#17 Boston College 7	College GameDay
November 17	#19 Cincinnati 13	#11 UCF 38	College GameDay; Cincinnati-UCF rivalry
November 24	#3 Notre Dame 24	USC 17	Jeweled Shillelagh
December 1	#2 Clemson 42	Pittsburgh 10	2018 ACC Championship Game

=== 2019 schedule ===
Beginning this season, all games, excluding the ACC Championship Game, started at 7:30 ET.

Date	Away	Home	Notes
August 31	#11 Oregon 21	#16 Auburn 27	Advocare Classic; College GameDay; 2011 BCS National Championship Game rematch
September 7	#6 LSU 45	#9 Texas 38	College GameDay
September 14	#1 Clemson 41	Syracuse 6	
September 21	Oklahoma State 30	#12 Texas 36	2018 Week 9 Rematch
September 28	#5 Ohio State 48	Nebraska 7	College GameDay
October 5	#25 Michigan State 10	#4 Ohio State 34	
October 12	#10 Penn State 17	#17 Iowa 12	
October 19	#16 Michigan 21	#7 Penn State 28	College GameDay; Michigan-Penn State rivalry
October 26	#8 Notre Dame 14	#19 Michigan 45	Michigan-Notre Dame rivalry
November 2	#15 SMU 48	#24 Memphis 54	College GameDay
November 9	#5 Clemson 56	NC State 10	Textile Bowl
November 16	#10 Oklahoma 34	#13 Baylor 31	College GameDay
November 23	#6 Oregon 28	Arizona State 31	
November 30	Colorado 15	#6 Utah 45	Rumble in the Rockies
December 7	#23 Virginia 17	#3 Clemson 62	2019 ACC Championship Game; 8 ET kickoff
December 21	#19 Boise State 7	Washington 38	2019 Las Vegas Bowl

=== 2020 schedule ===
Date	Away	Home	Notes
September 12	#1 Clemson 37	Wake Forest 13	College GameDay
September 19	#17 Miami 47	#18 Louisville 34	Originally Virginia Tech–Virginia; postponed due to COVID-19 positives at Virginia Tech. College GameDay; Louisville-Miami rivalry
September 26	Florida State 10	#12 Miami 52	College GameDay; Florida State-Miami rivalry Florida Cup
October 3	#18 Oklahoma 30	Iowa State 37	
October 10	#7 Miami 17	#1 Clemson 42	College GameDay
October 17	#5 North Carolina 28	Florida State 31	Originally Baylor–Oklahoma State; postponed due to COVID-19 positives at Baylor.
October 24	#18 Michigan 49	#21 Minnesota 24	College GameDay; Little Brown Jug
October 31	#3 Ohio State 38	#18 Penn State 25	College GameDay; Ohio State-Penn State rivalry
November 7	Stanford 14	#12 Oregon 35	Game briefly aired on ESPNEWS due to ABC News’ coverage of Joe Biden's victory address to the nation
November 14	#13 Wisconsin 49	Michigan 11	
November 21	#14 Oklahoma State 13	#18 Oklahoma 41	College GameDay; Bedlam Series
November 28	Utah 21	Washington 24	Originally Oklahoma–West Virginia; postponed, then later canceled due to COVID-19 positives at Oklahoma
December 5	#4 Clemson 45	Virginia Tech 10	
December 12	#16 USC 43	UCLA 38	Victory Bell
December 19	#20 Tulsa 24	#6 Cincinnati 27	2020 AAC Championship Game; 8 ET kickoff

=== 2021 schedule ===
Date	Away	Home	Notes
September 4	#5 Georgia 10	#3 Clemson 3	Duke's Mayo Classic; College GameDay; Clemson-Georgia rivalry
September 11	Washington 10	Michigan 31	8 ET kickoff
September 18	#22 Auburn 20	#10 Penn State 28	College GameDay
September 25	West Virginia 13	#4 Oklahoma 16	
October 2	Indiana 0	#4 Penn State 24	2020 Week 8 Rematch
October 9	#9 Michigan 32	Nebraska 29	
October 16	TCU 31	#4 Oklahoma 52	
October 23	#5 Ohio State 54	Indiana 7	
October 30	#20 Penn State 24	#5 Ohio State 33	Ohio State-Penn State rivalry
November 6	#7 Oregon 26	Washington 16	Oregon-Washington rivalry
November 13	#7 Notre Dame 28	Virginia 3	
November 20	#4 Oregon 7	#24 Utah 38	
November 27	#10 Oklahoma 33	#7 Oklahoma State 37	Bedlam Series
December 4	#17 Pittsburgh 45	#18 Wake Forest 21	2021 ACC Championship Game; 8 ET kickoff
December 18	Utah State 24	Oregon State 13	2021 LA Bowl

=== 2022 schedule ===
Date	Away	Home	Notes
September 3	#5 Notre Dame 10	#2 Ohio State 21	College GameDay
September 10	#10 USC 41	Stanford 28	Stanford–USC rivalry
September 17	#11 Michigan State 28	Washington 39	
September 24	Wisconsin 21	#3 Ohio State 52	
October 1	#10 NC State 20	#5 Clemson 30	Alternate feed also available on ESPN2; College GameDay; Textile Bowl
October 8	#5 Clemson 31	Boston College 3	
October 15	#4 Clemson 34	Florida State 28	Alternate feed also available on ESPN2; Clemson-Florida State rivalry
October 22	Minnesota 17	#16 Penn State 45	Governor's Victory Bell
October 29	Michigan State 7	#4 Michigan 29	Last Big Ten home game to be featured on Saturday Night Football; Paul Bunyan Trophy
November 5	Florida State 45	Miami 3	Florida State-Miami rivalry Florida Cup
November 12	#4 TCU 17	#18 Texas 10	College GameDay; TCU-Texas rivalry
November 19	#22 Oklahoma State 13	Oklahoma 28	Bedlam Series
November 26	#15 Notre Dame 27	#6 USC 38	Jeweled Shillelagh
December 3	#9 Clemson 39	#23 North Carolina 10	2022 ACC Championship Game; 8 ET kickoff
December 17	SMU 23	BYU 24	2022 New Mexico Bowl

=== 2023 schedule ===
Date	Away	Home	Notes
August 26	South Carolina State 7	Jackson State 37	MEAC/SWAC Challenge Kickoff
September 2	#21 North Carolina 31	South Carolina 17	Duke's Mayo Classic; College GameDay; North Carolina–South Carolina rivalry
September 9	#19 Wisconsin 22	Washington State 31	
September 16	Pittsburgh 6	West Virginia 17	Backyard Brawl
September 23	#3 Texas 38	Baylor 6	Baylor–Texas rivalry
September 30	#11 Notre Dame 21	#17 Duke 14	College GameDay
October 7	#10 Notre Dame 20	#25 Louisville 33	
October 14	#25 Miami 31	#12 North Carolina 41	
October 21	#16 Duke 20	#4 Florida State 38	
October 28	Colorado 16	#23 UCLA 28	
November 4	#5 Washington 52	#20 USC 42	
November 11	#7 Texas 29	TCU 26	TCU–Texas rivalry
November 18	#5 Washington 22	#11 Oregon State 20	Last Pac-12 home game to be featured on Saturday Night Football
November 25	#1 Georgia 31	Georgia Tech 23	Clean, Old-Fashioned Hate
December 2	#14 Louisville 6	#4 Florida State 16	2023 ACC Championship Game; 8 ET kickoff
December 16	UCLA 35	Boise State 22	2023 LA Bowl
December 23	Utah 7	Northwestern 14	2023 Las Vegas Bowl

=== 2024 schedule ===
Beginning this season, all Saturday Night Football games, as well as all regular season games airing on ABC, are simulcast on ESPN+

Date	Away	Home	Notes
August 24	Florida A&M 24	Norfolk State 23	MEAC/SWAC Challenge Kickoff
August 31	#7 Notre Dame 23	#20 Texas A&M 13	First SEC home game to be featured on Saturday Night Football; College GameDay
September 7	#14 Tennessee 51	#24 NC State 10	Duke's Mayo Classic
September 14	#1 Georgia 13	Kentucky 12	
September 21	#6 Tennessee 25	#15 Oklahoma 15	Oklahoma's first conference game as a member of the SEC; College GameDay
September 28	#2 Georgia 34	#4 Alabama 41	Alabama-Georgia rivalry 2023 SEC Championship Game Rematch; College GameDay
October 5	#4 Tennessee 14	Arkansas 19	
October 12	#9 Ole Miss 26	#13 LSU 29 (OT)	Magnolia Bowl
October 19	#5 Georgia 30	#1 Texas 15	2019 Sugar Bowl Rematch; College GameDay
October 26	#8 LSU 23	#14 Texas A&M 38	LSU-Texas A&M rivalry
November 2	#10 Texas A&M 20	South Carolina 44	
November 9	#11 Alabama 42	#14 LSU 13	College GameDay; Alabama-LSU rivalry
November 16	#6 Tennessee 17	#11 Georgia 31	College GameDay; Georgia-Tennessee rivalry
November 23	#7 Alabama 3	Oklahoma 24	2018 Orange Bowl Rematch
November 30	#3 Texas 17	#20 Texas A&M 7	Lone Star Showdown; First meeting between two schools since 2011; College GameDay
December 7	#18 Clemson 34	#8 SMU 31	2024 ACC Championship Game; 8 ET kickoff
December 21	#7 Tennessee 17	#6 Ohio State 42	College Football Playoff First Round game; 8 ET kickoff; simulcast on ESPN; Alternate feeds available on ESPN2, ESPNU, ESPNEWS, and SEC Network; College GameDay
December 28	#17 BYU 36	#20 Colorado 14	2024 Alamo Bowl

=== 2025 schedule ===
Beginning this season, all games on ABC are simulcast on ESPN's new direct-to-consumer streaming service.

Date	Away	Home	Notes
August 23	NC Central 31	Southern 14	MEAC/SWAC Challenge Kickoff
August 30	#9 LSU 17	#4 Clemson 10	2020 CFP National Championship Game Rematch
September 6	#15 Michigan 13	#18 Oklahoma 24	College GameDay
September 13	Florida 10	#3 LSU 20	Florida–LSU rivalry 2024 Week 12 Rematch
September 20	Florida 7	#4 Miami 26	Florida–Miami rivalry Florida Cup; College GameDay
September 27	#17 Alabama 24	#5 Georgia 21	Alabama–Georgia rivalry 2024 Week 5 Rematch
October 4	#3 Miami 28	#18 Florida State 22	Florida State–Miami rivalry Florida Cup; Alternate feed also available on ACC Network
October 11	#10 Georgia 20	Auburn 10	Deep South's Oldest Rivalry
October 18	#11 Tennessee 20	#6 Alabama 37	Third Saturday in October
October 25	#3 Texas A&M 49	#20 LSU 25	LSU–Texas A&M rivalry
November 1	#18 Oklahoma 33	#14 Tennessee 27	2024 Week 4 Rematch
November 8	LSU 9	#4 Alabama 20	Alabama–LSU rivalry
November 15	#10 Texas 10	#5 Georgia 35	2024 SEC Championship Game Rematch
November 22	#20 Tennessee 31	Florida 11	Florida–Tennessee rivalry
November 29	#10 Alabama 27	Auburn 20	Iron Bowl
December 6	Duke 27 (OT)	#17 Virginia 20	2025 ACC Championship Game; 8 ET kickoff Alternate feed also available on ACC Network
December 13	Boise State 10	Washington 38	2025 LA Bowl; 8 ET kickoff
December 27	#19 Virginia 13	Missouri 7	2025 Gator Bowl

=== 2026 schedule ===
Date	Away	Home	Notes
August 29	Alabama A&M 24	Howard 31	MEAC/SWAC Challenge Kickoff
September 5	Clemson 10	#11 LSU 51	2025 Week 1 Rematch; College GameDay
September 12	#1 Ohio State 23	#4 Texas 24	2025 Week 1 Rematch; College GameDay
September 19	#7 LSU 24	#8 Ole Miss 32	Magnolia Bowl; Lane Kiffin's return to Ole Miss; College GameDay
September 26	#23 Texas A&M 6	#10 LSU 35	LSU–Texas A&M rivalry 2025 Week 9 Rematch
October 3	#4 Miami 41	Clemson 13	
October 10	#2 Georgia 20	#6 Alabama 17	Alabama–Georgia rivalry College GameDay
October 17	#2 Notre Dame 24	#8 BYU 28	College GameDay
October 24	#7 Ole Miss 27	#19 Texas 34	
October 31	#1 Miami 38	North Carolina 35	
November 7	#2 Georgia 42	#10 Ole Miss 7	
November 14	#6 Texas 22	#21 LSU 21	
November 21	#1 Georgia 34	#21 South Carolina 6	Georgia–South Carolina rivalry
November 28	Auburn	Alabama	Iron Bowl
December 5	TBD	TBD	American Conference Championship Game; 8 ET kickoff
December 26	TBD	TBD	2026 Cactus Bowl
January 2, 2027	TBD	TBD	2027 Liberty Bowl

== Broadcast teams ==
=== 2006 ===
- Brent Musburger, play-by-play; Kirk Herbstreit and Bob Davie, analysts; and Lisa Salters, sideline reporter.
  - Ten games: Notre Dame–Georgia Tech, Ohio State–Texas, Nebraska–USC, Notre Dame–Michigan State, Ohio State–Iowa, Oregon–California, Michigan–Penn State, Oklahoma–Texas A&M, Wake Forest–Florida State, and Notre Dame–USC.
- Dan Fouts, play-by-play; Tim Brant, analyst; and Jack Arute, sideline reporter.
  - Three games: USC–Arizona, Nebraska–Iowa State, and UCLA–California.
- Mark Jones, play-by-play; David Norrie, analyst; and Stacey Dales, sideline reporter.
  - Two games: Arizona State–USC and Virginia Tech–Miami (Fla.).
- Gary Thorne, play-by-play; Andre Ware, analyst; and Todd Harris, sideline reporter.
  - One game: Texas–Kansas State.
- Brad Nessler, play-by-play; Bob Griese and Paul Maguire, analysts; and Erin Andrews, sideline reporter.
  - One game: California–USC.
- Mike Patrick, play-by-play; Todd Blackledge, analyst; and Holly Rowe, sideline reporter.
  - One game: Nebraska–Oklahoma (Big 12 Championship Game).

=== 2007 ===
- Brent Musburger, play-by-play; Kirk Herbstreit, analyst; Lisa Salters, and Chris Spielman, sideline reporters.
  - Eleven games: Tennessee–California, USC–Nebraska, Iowa–Wisconsin, USC–Washington, Ohio State–Purdue, Michigan–Illinois, Ohio State–Penn State, Florida State–Boston College, Kansas–Oklahoma State, Missouri–Kansas, and Oklahoma–Missouri (Big 12 Championship Game, with Spielman).
- Dan Fouts, play-by-play; Tim Brant, analyst; and Todd Harris, sideline reporter.
  - Two games: Washington State–USC and Notre Dame–UCLA.
- Terry Gannon, play-by-play; David Norrie, analyst; and Jeannine Edwards, sideline reporter.
  - Two games: Oregon State–USC and USC–California.
- Ron Franklin, play-by-play; Ed Cunningham, analyst; and Jack Arute, sideline reporter.
  - One game: Texas A&M–Oklahoma.
- Dave LaMont, play-by-play; Chris Spielman, analyst; and Quint Kessenich, sideline reporter.
  - One game: Boston College–Maryland.
- Brad Nessler, play-by-play; Bob Griese and Paul Maguire, analysts; and Bonnie Bernstein, sideline reporter.
  - One game: Oklahoma–Texas Tech.

=== 2008 ===
- Brent Musburger, play-by-play; Kirk Herbstreit, analyst; and Lisa Salters or Erin Andrews, sideline reporter.
  - Twelve games: Alabama–Clemson (Chick-fil-A Kickoff Game, with Andrews), Ohio State–USC (with Andrews), Georgia–Arizona State, Illinois–Penn State, Missouri–Texas, Penn State–Ohio State, Texas–Texas Tech, Oklahoma State–Texas Tech, Boston College–Florida State, Texas Tech–Oklahoma, Oklahoma–Oklahoma State, and Missouri–Oklahoma (Big 12 Championship Game).
- Ron Franklin, play-by-play; Ed Cunningham, analyst; and Heather Cox or Jack Arute, sideline reporter.
  - Two games: Michigan State–California (with Cox) and Oklahoma State–Colorado (with Arute).
- Sean McDonough, play-by-play; Chris Spielman, analyst; and Rob Stone or Erin Andrews, sideline reporter.
  - Two games: Virginia Tech–Nebraska (with Andrews) and California–USC (with Stone).
- Mike Patrick, play-by-play; Todd Blackledge, analyst; and Holly Rowe, sideline reporter.
  - One game: Ohio State–Wisconsin.
- Mark Jones, play-by-play; Bob Davie, analyst; and Todd Harris, sideline reporter.
  - One game: Oregon–USC.

=== 2009 ===
- Brent Musburger, play-by-play; Kirk Herbstreit, analyst; and Lisa Salters, sideline reporter.
  - Twelve games: Alabama–Virginia Tech (Chick-fil-A Kickoff Game), Texas Tech–Texas, Iowa–Penn State, Oklahoma–Miami (Fla.), Michigan–Iowa, Texas–Missouri, USC–Oregon, Connecticut–Cincinnati, Notre Dame–Pittsburgh, Oregon–Arizona, Notre Dame–Stanford, and Texas–Nebraska (Big 12 Championship Game).
- Mike Patrick, play-by-play; Craig James, analyst; and Heather Cox, sideline reporter.
  - Three games: Oregon State–USC, USC–Arizona State, and Texas Tech–Oklahoma State.
- Ron Franklin, play-by-play; Ed Cunningham, analyst; and Shelley Smith, sideline reporter.
  - Three games: USC–California (with Smith), Oklahoma–Nebraska, and Kansas–Texas (with Smith).
- Sean McDonough, play-by-play; Matt Millen, analyst; and Holly Rowe, sideline reporter.
  - Two games: Texas–Oklahoma State and Georgia–Georgia Tech.

=== 2010 ===
- Brent Musburger, play-by-play; Kirk Herbstreit, analyst; and Erin Andrews, Heather Cox, or Holly Rowe, sideline reporter.
  - Ten games: LSU–North Carolina (Chick-fil-A Kickoff Game), Oregon State–Boise State, Stanford–Oregon, Florida State–Miami (Fla.) (with Cox), Oklahoma–Missouri, Oregon–USC, Arizona–Stanford, Nebraska–Texas A&M (with Cox), Oklahoma–Oklahoma State, and Nebraska–Oklahoma (Big 12 Championship Game) (with Rowe).
- Mike Patrick, play-by-play; and Craig James, analyst.
  - Four games: USC–Stanford (with Shelley Smith), Ohio State–Minnesota (with Ray Bentley), Clemson–Florida State (with Jeannine Edwards), and Florida State–Maryland.
- Ron Franklin, play-by-play; and Ed Cunningham, analyst.
  - Three games: Texas–Texas Tech (with Jeannine Edwards), Missouri–Texas Tech, and USC–Arizona (with Shelley Smith).
- Sean McDonough, play-by-play; Matt Millen, analyst; and Heather Cox, sideline reporter.
  - Two games: Notre Dame–Boston College and Oklahoma State–Texas.
- Brad Nessler, play-by-play; and Todd Blackledge, analyst.
  - Two games: Notre Dame–Michigan State (with Holly Rowe) and Notre Dame–USC (with Shelley Smith).
- Mark Neely, play-by-play; Mike Bellotti and Brock Huard, analysts.
  - One game: USC–Oregon State.

=== 2011 ===
- Brent Musburger, play-by-play; Kirk Herbstreit, analyst; Erin Andrews or Lisa Salters, and Tom Rinaldi, sideline reporters.
  - Seven games: Oregon–LSU (Advocare Classic), Oklahoma–Florida State (with Rinaldi), LSU–West Virginia, Nebraska–Wisconsin, Stanford–USC, Kansas State–Oklahoma State (with Salters), and Oregon–Stanford.
- Sean McDonough, play-by-play; Matt Millen, analyst; and Heather Cox or Jeannine Edwards, sideline reporter.
  - Two games: Ohio State–Nebraska (with Edwards) and Washington–Stanford (with Cox).
- Mike Patrick, play-by-play; Craig James, analyst; and Jenn Brown, sideline reporter.
  - One game: Clemson–Georgia Tech.
- Brad Nessler, play-by-play; Todd Blackledge, analyst; and Holly Rowe, sideline reporter.
  - One game: Texas Tech–Oklahoma.
- Mark Jones, play-by-play; and Ed Cunningham, analyst.
  - One game: Notre Dame–Wake Forest.

=== 2012 ===
- Brent Musburger, play-by-play; Kirk Herbstreit, analyst; Heather Cox, and Tom Rinaldi, sideline reporters.
  - Twelve games: Michigan–Alabama (Advocare Classic), Notre Dame–Michigan State, Clemson–Florida State, Wisconsin–Nebraska, Florida State–Miami, Notre Dame–Oklahoma, Oklahoma State–Kansas State, Notre Dame–Boston College, Stanford–Oregon, and Notre Dame–USC (with Rinaldi).
- Brad Nessler, play-by-play; Todd Blackledge, analyst; and Holly Rowe, sideline reporter.
  - Two games: Nebraska–Ohio State, Texas–Kansas State.
- Sean McDonough, play-by-play; Chris Spielman, analyst; and Quint Kessenich, sideline reporter.
  - One game: Baylor–Texas.

=== 2013 ===
- Brent Musburger, play-by-play; Kirk Herbstreit, analyst; Heather Cox, and Tom Rinaldi, sideline reporters.
  - Eleven games: Georgia–Clemson, Notre Dame–Purdue, Kansas State–Texas, Wisconsin–Ohio State, Ohio State–Northwestern, Florida State–Clemson, Miami–Florida State (with Rinaldi), Notre Dame–Pittsburgh, Stanford–USC, Baylor–Oklahoma State, Duke–Florida State (ACC Championship)
- Sean McDonough, play-by-play; Chris Spielman, analyst; and Shannon Spake, sideline reporter.
  - Two games: Michigan–Connecticut, UCLA–USC.
- Brad Nessler, play-by-play; Todd Blackledge, analyst; and Holly Rowe, sideline reporter.
  - One game: Penn State–Ohio State.

=== 2014 ===
- Chris Fowler, play-by-play; Kirk Herbstreit, analyst; Heather Cox, and Tom Rinaldi, sideline reporters.
  - Nine games: Florida State–Oklahoma State (Advocare Classic), Tennessee–Oklahoma, Clemson–Florida State (with Rinaldi), Notre Dame–Syracuse, Nebraska–Michigan State, Notre Dame–Florida State (with Rinaldi), Ohio State–Michigan State, Florida State–Miami, Florida State–Georgia Tech (ACC Championship)
- Brad Nessler, play-by-play; Todd Blackledge, analyst; and Holly Rowe, sideline reporter.
  - Three games: Ohio State–Penn State, USC–UCLA, Oregon-Oregon State
- Sean McDonough, play-by-play; Chris Spielman, analyst; and Todd McShay, sideline reporter.
  - One game: Illinois–Ohio State
- Bob Wischusen, play-by-play; Matt Millen, analyst; and Quint Kessenich, sideline reporter.
  - One game: Oklahoma State–Kansas State

=== 2015 ===
- Chris Fowler or Rece Davis, play-by-play; Kirk Herbstreit, analyst; Heather Cox and Tom Rinaldi, sideline reporters.
  - Eleven games: Wisconsin–Alabama (Advocare Classic), Oregon–Michigan State (with Davis), UCLA–Arizona, Notre Dame–Clemson, Miami–Florida State, Penn State–Ohio State, Ohio State–Rutgers, Notre Dame-Temple, Oklahoma-Baylor, Oklahoma-Oklahoma State (with Rinaldi), North Carolina-Clemson (ACC Championship, with Rinaldi)
- Brad Nessler, play-by-play; Todd Blackledge, analyst; and Holly Rowe, sideline reporter.
  - Two games: Minnesota-Ohio State, TCU-Oklahoma
- Sean McDonough, play-by-play; Chris Spielman, analyst; and Todd McShay, sideline reporter.
  - One game: Stanford–USC

=== 2016 ===
- Chris Fowler or Rece Davis, play-by-play; Kirk Herbstreit, analyst; Samantha Ponder and Tom Rinaldi, sideline reporters, Jerry Punch and Marty Smith pit reporters (Battle at Bristol only)
  - Thirteen games: USC-Alabama (Advocare Classic), Virginia Tech-Tennessee (Pilot Flying J Battle at Bristol, with Davis, Punch and Smith), Stanford-UCLA, Louisville-Clemson (with Rinaldi), Florida State-Miami, Ohio State-Wisconsin, Ohio State-Penn State, Clemson-Florida State, Nebraska-Ohio State, Michigan-Iowa, Oklahoma-West Virginia, Clemson-Virginia Tech (ACC Championship)
- Joe Tessitore, play-by-play; Todd Blackledge, analyst; Holly Rowe, sideline reporter.
  - Two games: USC-Stanford, Florida-Florida State

=== 2017 ===
- Chris Fowler, play-by-play; Kirk Herbstreit, analyst; Maria Taylor and Tom Rinaldi, sideline reporters
  - Thirteen games: Florida State–Alabama (Chick-fil-A Kickoff Game, with Rinaldi), Oklahoma–Ohio State, Clemson-Louisville, Penn State-Iowa, Clemson-Virginia Tech (with Rinaldi), Michigan State-Michigan, Michigan-Penn State (with Rinaldi), Georgia Tech-Clemson, Virginia Tech-Miami, Notre Dame–Miami (with Rinaldi), UCLA–USC, Notre Dame–Stanford, Miami-Clemson (ACC Championship, with Rinaldi)
- Steve Levy, play-by-play, Brian Griese, analyst; Todd McShay, sideline reporter
  - Two games: Utah-USC, Texas Tech-Oklahoma

=== 2018 ===
- Chris Fowler, play-by-play; Kirk Herbstreit, analyst; Maria Taylor and Tom Rinaldi, sideline reporters.
  - Thirteen games: Louisville-Alabama (Camping World Kickoff), Ohio State-TCU (Advocare Showdown), Stanford-Oregon, Ohio State-Penn State (with Rinaldi), Notre Dame-Virginia Tech, Wisconsin-Michigan, Ohio State-Purdue (with Rinaldi), Texas-Oklahoma State, Clemson-Boston College, Cincinnati-UCF, Notre Dame-USC, Clemson-Pitt (ACC Championship)
- Sean McDonough, play-by-play; Todd Blackledge, analyst; Holly Rowe, sideline reporter
  - One game: Penn State-Pittsburgh
- Steve Levy, play-by-play; Brian Griese, analyst; Todd McShay, sideline reporter
  - One game: Oklahoma-Texas Tech

=== 2019 ===
- Chris Fowler, Rece Davis, Sean McDonough, or Bob Wischusen, play-by-play; Kirk Herbstreit, analyst; Maria Taylor or Molly McGrath, sideline reporters.
  - Thirteen games: Oregon-Auburn (Advocare Classic), LSU–Texas (with Davis), Clemson–Syracuse (with McDonough), Oklahoma State–Texas, Ohio State-Nebraska, Michigan State–Ohio State, Michigan–Penn State, Notre Dame-Michigan, SMU-Memphis, Clemson–NC State, Oklahoma-Baylor, Oregon-Arizona State, Boise State–Washington (Las Vegas Bowl, with Wischusen and McGrath)
- Steve Levy, play-by-play; Brian Griese, analyst; Todd McShay, and Molly McGrath or Maria Taylor, sideline reporters.
  - Two games: Colorado–Utah, Virginia-Clemson (ACC Championship, with Taylor)
- Sean McDonough, play-by-play; Todd Blackledge, analyst; Holly Rowe, sideline reporter
  - One game: Penn State-Iowa

=== 2020 ===
- Chris Fowler, play-by-play; Kirk Herbstreit, analyst; Maria Taylor, Allison Williams, Molly McGrath, or Holly Rowe, sideline reporters.
  - Nine games: Miami-Louisville (with Williams), Florida State-Miami (with McGrath), Miami-Clemson (with Williams), Michigan-Minnesota (with Taylor), Ohio State-Penn State (with Taylor), Stanford–Oregon (with Taylor), Wisconsin-Michigan (with Rowe), Oklahoma State–Oklahoma (with Rowe), Clemson-Virginia Tech (with Taylor)
- Sean McDonough, play-by-play; Todd Blackledge, analyst; Todd McShay, and Allison Williams or Molly McGrath, sideline reporters.
  - Three games: Clemson–Wake Forest (with Williams), Oklahoma-Iowa State (with McGrath), North Carolina-Florida State (with McGrath)
- Dave Pasch or Joe Tessitore, play-by-play; Greg McElroy, analyst; and Allison Williams or Holly Rowe, sideline reporters
  - Two games: USC–UCLA (with Pasch and Williams), Tulsa–Cincinnati (AAC Championship, with Tessitore and Rowe)
- Beth Mowins, play–by–play; Kirk Morrison, analyst; and Stormy Buonantony, sideline reporter
  - One game: Utah–Washington

=== 2021 ===
- Chris Fowler, play-by-play; Kirk Herbstreit, analyst; Holly Rowe, sideline reporter.
  - Six games: Georgia-Clemson (Duke's Mayo Classic), Auburn-Penn State, West Virginia-Oklahoma, TCU-Oklahoma, Penn State-Ohio State, Oklahoma-Oklahoma State
- Sean McDonough, play-by-play; Todd Blackledge, analyst; and Molly McGrath, sideline reporter.
  - Four games: Washington-Michigan, Indiana-Penn State, Michigan-Nebraska, Oregon-Utah
- Dave Pasch, play-by-play; Dusty Dvoracek, analyst; and Tom Luginbill, sideline reporter.
  - Two games: Ohio State-Indiana, Notre Dame-Virginia
- Mark Jones, play-by-play; Robert Griffin III, analyst; and Quint Kessenich, sideline reporter.
  - Two games: Oregon-Washington, Pittsburgh-Wake Forest (ACC Championship)
- Joe Tessitore, play-by-play; Greg McElroy, analyst; and Laura Rutledge, sideline reporter.
  - One game: Utah State-Oregon State (LA Bowl)

=== 2022 ===
- Chris Fowler or Rece Davis, play-by-play; Kirk Herbstreit, analyst: Holly Rowe, sideline reporter.
  - Seven games: Notre Dame–Ohio State, USC–Stanford (with Davis), Wisconsin–Ohio State, NC State–Clemson, Clemson–Florida State, TCU–Texas, Notre Dame-USC
- Sean McDonough, play-by-play; Todd Blackledge, analyst; and Molly McGrath, sideline reporter.
  - Three games: Clemson-Boston College, Michigan State-Michigan, Clemson-North Carolina (ACC Championship)
- Joe Tessitore, play-by-play; Greg McElroy, analyst; and Katie George, sideline reporter.
  - Two games: Minnesota-Penn State, Florida State-Miami
- Tom Hart, play-by-play; Brock Osweiler, analyst; and Taylor McGregor, sideline reporter.
  - One game: SMU–BYU (New Mexico Bowl)
- Mark Jones, play-by-play; Robert Griffin III, analyst; and Quint Kessenich, sideline reporter.
  - One game: Michigan State–Washington
- Dave Pasch, play-by-play; Dusty Dvoracek, analyst; and Tom Luginbill, sideline reporter.
  - One game: Oklahoma State-Oklahoma

=== 2023 ===
- Chris Fowler or Rece Davis, play-by-play; Kirk Herbstreit, analyst: and Holly Rowe, sideline reporter.
  - Five games: Notre Dame-Duke (with Davis), Duke-Florida State, Colorado-UCLA, Washington-USC, Washington-Oregon State
- Sean McDonough, play-by-play; Greg McElroy, analyst; and Molly McGrath or Stormy Buonantony, sideline reporter.
  - Five games: North Carolina–South Carolina (Duke's Mayo Classic), Pitt-West Virginia, Miami-North Carolina, Georgia-Georgia Tech, Utah-Northwestern (Las Vegas Bowl) (with Buonantony)
- Dave Pasch, play-by-play; Dusty Dvoracek, analyst; and Tom Luginbill, sideline reporter.
  - Two games: Texas-Baylor, Texas-TCU
- Joe Tessitore, play-by-play; Jordan Rodgers or Jesse Palmer, analyst; and Katie George, sideline reporter.
  - Two games: Notre Dame-Louisville (with Rodgers), Louisville-Florida State (ACC Championship) (with Palmer)
- Mark Jones, play-by-play; Louis Riddick, analyst; and Quint Kessenich, sideline reporter.
  - One game: Wisconsin–Washington State
- Tiffany Greene, play-by-play; Jay Walker, analyst; Harry Lyles Jr., and Quint Kessenich, sideline reporters.
  - One game: South Carolina State–Jackson State (MEAC/SWAC Challenge)
- Dave Flemming, play-by-play; Brock Osweiler, analyst; and Kayla Burton, sideline reporter.
  - One game: UCLA-Boise State (LA Bowl)

=== 2024 ===
- Chris Fowler or Rece Davis, play-by-play; Kirk Herbstreit, analyst; Holly Rowe, Laura Rutledge, Katie George or Marty Smith, sideline reporters.
  - Twelve games: Notre Dame-Texas A&M, Tennessee-NC State (Duke's Mayo Classic; with Davis), Tennessee-Oklahoma, Georgia-Alabama (with Rutledge), Tennessee-Arkansas, Georgia-Texas (with George), LSU-Texas A&M, Alabama-LSU, Tennessee-Georgia (with Rutledge), Alabama-Oklahoma, Texas-Texas A&M, Tennessee-Ohio State (CFP First Round; with Smith)
- Sean McDonough, play-by-play; Greg McElroy, analyst; and Molly McGrath, sideline reporter.
  - Four games: Georgia-Kentucky, Ole Miss-LSU, Texas A&M-South Carolina, Clemson-SMU (ACC Championship)
- Tiffany Greene, play-by-play; Jay Walker, analyst; and Quint Kessenich, sideline reporter.
  - One game: Florida A&M–Norfolk State (MEAC/SWAC Challenge)
- Dave Pasch, play-by-play; Dusty Dvoracek, analyst; and Taylor McGregor, sideline reporter.
  - One game: BYU-Colorado (Alamo Bowl)

=== 2025 ===
- Chris Fowler, play-by-play; Kirk Herbstreit, analyst; Holly Rowe, Molly McGrath or Laura Rutledge, sideline reporters.
  - Ten games: LSU-Clemson (with McGrath), Michigan-Oklahoma, Florida-Miami, Alabama-Georgia (with Rutledge), Miami-Florida State, Texas A&M-LSU, Oklahoma-Tennessee, Texas-Georgia (with Rutledge), Tennessee-Florida, Alabama-Auburn
- Sean McDonough, play-by-play; Greg McElroy, analyst; Molly McGrath and Taylor McGregor, sideline reporters.
  - Five games: Florida-LSU, Georgia-Auburn, Tennessee-Alabama, LSU-Alabama, Duke-Virginia (ACC Championship, with McGregor)
- Dave Pasch, play-by-play; Dusty Dvoracek, analyst; and Taylor McGregor, sideline reporter.
  - One game: Boise State-Washington (LA Bowl)
- Bob Wischusen, play-by-play; Louis Riddick, analyst; and Kris Budden, sideline reporter.
  - One game: Virginia-Missouri (Gator Bowl)
- Tiffany Greene, play-by-play; Jay Walker, analyst; and Quint Kessenich, sideline reporter.
  - One game: North Carolina Central–Southern (MEAC/SWAC Challenge)

=== 2026 ===
- Chris Fowler, play-by-play; Kirk Herbstreit, analyst; Holly Rowe, and Laura Rutledge, sideline reporters.
  - Ten games: Clemson-LSU (with Rutledge), Ohio State-Texas (with Rutledge), LSU-Ole Miss (with Rutledge), Miami-Clemson, Georgia-Alabama (with Rutledge), Notre Dame-BYU, Ole Miss-Texas, Texas-LSU, Georgia-South Carolina (with Rutledge), Auburn-Alabama
- Sean McDonough, play-by-play; Greg McElroy, analyst; and Katie George, sideline reporter.
  - Two games: Miami-North Carolina, Georgia-Ole Miss
- Joe Tessitore, play-by-play; Jesse Palmer, analyst; and Kris Budden, sideline reporter.
  - One game: Texas A&M-LSU
- Tiffany Greene, play-by-play; Jay Walker, analyst; and Quint Kessenich, sideline reporter.
  - One game: Alabama A&M-Howard (MEAC/SWAC Challenge)

== Standings ==
Team	Appearances	Wins	Losses	Win Pct.
Alabama	15	13	2	.909
LSU	15	9	6	.714
Boise State	4	1	3	.250
UCF	1	1	0	1.000
Georgia	15	11	3	.778
Cincinnati	3	2	1	.667
Pittsburgh	6	3	3	.500
Ohio State	33	26	7	.813
Florida State	31	23	8	.742
USC	35	22	13	.628
Stanford	15	11	4	.733
Kansas State	6	4	2	.667
Virginia Tech	6	2	4	.333
Notre Dame	31	16	15	.533
Texas	25	17	8	.667
Michigan	12	7	5	.636
Oklahoma	37	26	11	.686
Oregon	15	7	8	.467
Texas Tech	10	5	5	.500
Oklahoma State	18	7	11	.389
California	8	4	4	.500
Iowa	6	3	3	.500
Baylor	6	1	5	.167
Maryland	2	1	1	.500
Wake Forest	4	1	3	.250
Michigan State	10	4	6	.400
Wisconsin	8	2	6	.250
Georgia Tech	6	1	5	.167
Kansas	3	1	2	.333
Miami (FL)	20	9	11	.312
Texas A&M	9	3	6	.286
Penn State	16	9	7	.563
Missouri	8	2	6	.286
Nebraska	16	4	12	.250
Boston College	7	1	6	.143
Oregon State	7	1	6	.143
Colorado	4	0	4	.000
Connecticut	2	0	2	.000
Duke	4	1	3	.250
Iowa State	2	1	1	.500
Minnesota	4	0	4	.000
North Carolina	7	2	5	.333
Purdue	3	1	2	.333
Tennessee	11	4	7	.375
Washington State	2	1	1	.500
West Virginia	4	1	3	.250
Illinois	3	0	3	.000
UCLA	10	5	5	.500
Washington	10	6	4	.556
Arizona State	4	1	3	.250
Clemson	22	12	10	.632
Arizona	5	0	5	.000
Northwestern	2	1	1	.500
Syracuse	2	0	2	.000
Louisville	6	1	5	.167
Temple	1	0	1	.000
TCU	5	1	4	.200
Rutgers	1	0	1	.000
Florida	4	0	4	.000
Utah	5	2	3	.400
SMU	3	0	3	.000
Tulsa	1	0	1	.000
Memphis	1	1	0	1.000
Virginia	4	1	3	.250
Auburn	4	1	3	.250
NC State	3	0	3	.000
Indiana	2	0	2	.000
Utah State	1	1	0	1.000
BYU	3	3	0	1.000
South Carolina State	1	0	1	.000
Jackson State	1	1	0	1.000
South Carolina	3	1	1	.500
Florida A&M	1	1	0	1.000
Norfolk State	1	0	1	.000
Kentucky	1	0	1	.000
Arkansas	1	1	0	1.000
Ole Miss	4	1	3	.500
NC Central	1	1	0	1.000
Southern	1	0	1	.000
Alabama A&M	1	0	1	.000
Howard	1	1	0	1.000

== Nielsen ratings ==
=== Top 10 Regular Season Games ===
Rank	Date	Matchup				Viewers (millions)	TV Rating	Significance
1	November 24, 2012, 8:00 ET	#1 Notre Dame	22	USC	13	16.1	9.4	Notre Dame–USC rivalry
2	October 18, 2014, 8:00 ET	#5 Notre Dame	27	#1 Florida State	31	13.3	7.9	
3	October 19, 2024, 7:30 ET	#5 Georgia	30	#1 Texas	15	13.2	6.5	2019 Sugar Bowl rematch/College GameDay
4	September 2, 2017, 8:00 ET	#3 Florida State	7	#1 Alabama	24	12.3	6.9	Chick-fil-A Kickoff Game/College GameDay
5	November 1, 2008, 8:00 ET	#1 Texas	33	#7 Texas Tech	39	12.2	7.5	Texas-Texas Tech Rivalry
6	September 28, 2024, 7:30 ET	#2 Georgia	34	#4 Alabama	41	12.0	6.0	Alabama-Georgia rivalry/College GameDay
7	September 13, 2008, 8:00 ET	#5 Ohio State	3	#1 USC	35	11.8	n.a	
8	September 4, 2016, 7:30 ET	#10 Notre Dame	47	Texas	50	10.9	6.4	Sunday Night game
9	November 22, 2008, 8:00 ET	#2 Texas Tech	21	#5 Oklahoma	65	10.7	n.a	
10	September 3, 2022, 7:30 ET	#5 Notre Dame	10	#2 Ohio State	21	10.5	5.2	

=== Seasonal ===
Seasonal rankings (based on average total viewers per episode) of Saturday Night Football on ABC.

Season	Episodes	Timeslot	Season premiere	Season finale	TV season	Season rank	Viewers (in millions)
1st	18	Saturday 8:00	September 2, 2006	December 2, 2006	2006–2007	#97	7.6
2nd	18	Saturday 8:00	September 1, 2007	December 1, 2007	2007–2008	#121	6.2
3rd	18	Saturday 8:00	August 30, 2008	December 6, 2008	2008–2009	#61	8.3
4th	20	Saturday 8:00	September 5, 2009	December 5, 2009	2009–2010	#78	6.3
5th	22	Saturday 8:00	September 4, 2010	December 4, 2010	2010–2011	#95	6.0
6th	16	Saturday 8:00	September 3, 2011	December 3, 2011	2011–2012	#88	6.4
7th	14	Saturday 8:00	September 1, 2012	December 1, 2012	2012–2013	#66	6.9
8th	14	Saturday 8:00	August 31, 2013	December 7, 2013	2013–2014	#82	5.6
9th	14	Saturday 8:00	August 30, 2014	December 6, 2014	2014–2015	#88	6.4
10th	14	Saturday 8:00	September 5, 2015	December 5, 2015	2015–2016	#92	5.2
11th	14	Saturday 8:00	September 3, 2016	December 3, 2016	2016–2017	#67	6.0
12th	15	Saturday 8:00	September 2, 2017	December 2, 2017	2017–2018	#78	5.8
13th	14	Saturday 8:00	September 1, 2018	December 1, 2018	2018–2019	#86	5.1
14th	16	Saturday 7:30	August 31, 2019	December 21, 2019	2019–2020	#71	4.9
15th	15	Saturday 7:30	September 12, 2020	December 19, 2020	2020–2021	#80	3.8
16th	15	Saturday 7:30	September 4, 2021	December 18, 2021	2021–2022	#52	4.6
17th	15	Saturday 7:30	September 3, 2022	December 17, 2022	2022–2023	#56	4.0
18th	17	Saturday 7:30	August 26, 2023	December 23, 2023	2023–2024	#55	3.9
19th	18	Saturday 7:30	August 24, 2024	December 28, 2024	2024–2025	#68	7.4
20th	18	Saturday 7:30	August 23, 2025	December 27, 2025	2025–2026	TBD	TBA
21st	17	Saturday 7:30	August 29, 2026	January 2, 2027	2026–2027	TBD	TBA

== Theme music ==
At the time the Saturday night package began in 2006, ABC Sports was integrated with ESPN, resulting in ESPN production concepts being applied to ABC-televised sports events. As a result, during the 2006 and 2007 seasons, the theme music used for the ESPN College Football and College GameDay broadcasts was used on ABC's college football telecasts – including Saturday Night Football – with the exception in both years being the Rose Bowl, during which it used the bowl game version of the network's 1998-2005 sports theme (a cut that had traditionally been used in broadcast intros). Saturday Night Football games began using the bowl version of the 1998-2005 theme as well in 2008, continuing through the 2010 BCS National Championship Game.

The intro theme was updated in 2011, with the main theme music being changed to a different cut of the 1998-2005 bowl game theme (one that had usually been used during studio shows in the past). Bowl Championship Series games aired on ESPN during this period were produced identically to Saturday Night Football productions, and used this same theme music arrangement.

In 2012, the theme for all college football telecasts on both ESPN and ABC was changed to a heavily updated version of yet another one of ABC's 1998-2005 themes (this one had usually been used for intro teasers in the past). However, unlike previous SNF themes, this theme was a completely new recording, using the tune of the 1998-2005 song as the base.

In 2015, ABC began using the same theme used by all ESPN college football productions since the 2014-15 New Years' Six bowl games. The theme was later revamped in 2020, and again in 2025.

Starting with the addition of the conference in 2024, Southeastern Conference home games on Saturday Night Football will use the SEC on ABC theme, a modernized version of ESPN's college football theme from the 2000s, composed by Bob Christianson,.

== See also ==
- College Football Final
- College Football Scoreboard
- College GameDay
- College Football on ABC
- ESPN College Football Thursday Primetime
- ESPN College Football Saturday Primetime
- ESPN2 College Football Saturday Primetime
