= 2023 Northwestern Wildcats football team =

American college football season

2023 Northwestern Wildcats football

Las Vegas Bowl champion

Las Vegas Bowl, W 14–7 vs. Utah
- Conference: Big Ten Conference
- West Division
- Record: 8–5 (5–4 Big Ten)
- Head coach: David Braun (1st season)
- Offensive coordinator: Mike Bajakian (4th season)
- Offensive scheme: Spread
- Base defense: Multiple 4–3
- Home stadium: Ryan Field

Uniform

2023 Big Ten Conference football standings
	Conf.			Overall
Team	W		L	W		L
East Division
No. 1 Michigan xy$#^	9	–	0	15	–	0
No. 10 Ohio State	8	–	1	11	–	2
No. 13 Penn State	7	–	2	10	–	3
Maryland	4	–	5	8	–	5
Rutgers	3	–	6	7	–	6
Indiana	1	–	8	3	–	9
Michigan State†	0	–	7	0	–	8
West Division
No. 24 Iowa xy	7	–	2	10	–	4
Northwestern	5	–	4	8	–	5
Wisconsin	5	–	4	7	–	6
Minnesota	3	–	6	6	–	7
Illinois	3	–	6	5	–	7
Nebraska	3	–	6	5	–	7
Purdue	3	–	6	4	–	8
Championship: Michigan 26, Iowa 0
# – College Football Playoff champion; ^ – College Football Playoff participant; $ – Conference champion; x – Division champion/co-champions; y – Championship game participant; † — NCAA vacated all wins for Michigan State (4–8, 2–7); Rankings from AP Poll

The 2023 Northwestern Wildcats football team represented Northwestern University in the West Division of the Big Ten Conference during the 2023 NCAA Division I FBS football season. They were led by first-year head coach David Braun and played their home games at Ryan Field (in its final season) in Evanston, Illinois. Braun began the season as interim head coach and was elevated to permanent head coach on November 15 following the team's 24–10 road win over Wisconsin.

The Wildcats finished the regular season with a record of 7–5 and went 5–4 in conference play to finish second in the Big Ten West. Braun was named Big Ten Coach of the Year. The Wildcats were selected to face Utah in the Las Vegas Bowl, where they won 14–7.

== Hazing and sexual abuse allegations ==
On July 7, 2023, the school announced that they had suspended head coach Pat Fitzgerald for two weeks without pay after an investigation related to hazing within the football program. Three days later as details emerged of the allegations from a former player that included hazing and sexual abuse, the school fired Fitzgerald after 17 years as head coach. The school named defensive coordinator David Braun the interim head coach for the season.

== Preseason ==
=== Big 10 media poll ===
The Wildcats were predicted to finish seventh in the Big Ten's West Division.

Big Ten media poll West Division
Predicted finish	Team	Points (1st place votes)
1	Wisconsin	233 (20)
2	Iowa	232 (16)
3	Minnesota	176 (1)
4	Illinois	152
5	Nebraska	116
6	Purdue	89
7	Northwestern	38

== Schedule ==
Date	Time	Opponent	Site	TV	Result	Attendance	Source
September 3	11:00 a.m.	at Rutgers	SHI Stadium; Piscataway, NJ	CBS	L 7–24	53,026	
September 9	2:30 p.m.	UTEP*	Ryan Field; Evanston, IL	BTN	W 38–7	14,851	
September 16	2:30 p.m.	at No. 21 Duke*	Wallace Wade Stadium; Durham, NC	ACCN	L 14–38	18,141	
September 23	6:30 p.m.	Minnesota	Ryan Field; Evanston, IL	BTN	W 37–34 ^{OT}	20,148	
September 30	11:00 a.m.	No. 6 Penn State	Ryan Field; Evanston, IL	BTN	L 13–41	25,064	
October 7	2:00 p.m.	Howard*^{†}	Ryan Field; Evanston, IL	BTN	W 23–20	22,160	
October 21	2:30 p.m.	at Nebraska	Memorial Stadium; Lincoln, NE	BTN	L 9–17	86,769	
October 28	11:00 a.m.	Maryland	Ryan Field; Evanston, IL	BTN	W 33–27	19,286	
November 4	2:30 p.m.	Iowa	Wrigley Field; Chicago, IL	Peacock	L 7–10	38,000	
November 11	2:30 p.m.	at Wisconsin	Camp Randall Stadium; Madison, WI	FS1	W 24–10	76,124	
November 18	11:00 a.m.	Purdue	Ryan Field; Evanston, IL	BTN	W 23–15	23,291	
November 25	2:30 p.m.	at Illinois	Memorial Stadium; Champaign, IL (rivalry)	BTN	W 45–43	42,310	
December 23	6:30 p.m.	vs. Utah*	Allegiant Stadium; Paradise, NV (Las Vegas Bowl)	ABC	W 14–7	20,897	
*Non-conference game; ^{†}Homecoming; Rankings from AP Poll (and CFP Rankings, after October 31) - Released prior to game; All times are in Central time; Source:

== Game summaries ==
=== At Rutgers ===
	1	2	3	4	Total
Wildcats	0	0	0	7	7
Scarlet Knights	7	10	7	0	24

Statistics	NU	RUTG
First downs	13	20
Total yards	201	285
Rushing yards	12	122
Passing yards	189	163
Turnovers	2	1
Time of possession	22:04	37:56

Team	Category	Player	Statistics
Northwestern	Passing	Ben Bryant	20/36, 169 yards, 2 INT
Northwestern	Rushing	Brendan Sullivan	4 rushes, 11 yards
Northwestern	Receiving	Camron Johnson	4 receptions, 45 yards
Rutgers	Passing	Gavin Wimsatt	17/29, 163 yards, TD
Rutgers	Rushing	Kyle Monangai	14 rushes, 49 yards, TD
Rutgers	Receiving	Isaiah Washington	4 receptions, 36 yards

=== UTEP ===
	1	2	3	4	Total
Miners	7	0	0	0	7
Wildcats	7	0	21	10	38

Statistics	UTEP	NU
First downs	18	17
Total yards	319	391
Rushing yards	104	184
Passing yards	215	207
Turnovers	3	0
Time of possession	31:21	28:39

Team	Category	Player	Statistics
UTEP	Passing	Gavin Hardison	17/25, 192 yards, TD, 2 INT
UTEP	Rushing	Torrance Burgess Jr.	7 rushes, 34 yards
UTEP	Receiving	Jeremiah Ballard	4 receptions, 92 yards
Northwestern	Passing	Ben Bryant	11/17, 116 yards, TD
Northwestern	Rushing	Cam Porter	17 rushes, 90 yards
Northwestern	Receiving	Joseph Himon II	1 reception, 85 yards, TD

=== At No. 21 Duke ===
	1	2	3	4	Total
Wildcats	0	7	0	7	14
No. 21 Blue Devils	7	10	14	7	38

Statistics	NU	DUKE
First downs	19	25
Total yards	267	487
Rushing yards	104	268
Passing yards	163	219
Turnovers	1	0
Time of possession	28:54	31:06

Team	Category	Player	Statistics
Northwestern	Passing	Ben Bryant	17/34, 123 yards, TD, INT
Northwestern	Rushing	Cam Porter	10 rushes, 49 yards
Northwestern	Receiving	Camron Johnson	5 receptions, 45 yards
Duke	Passing	Riley Leonard	15/20, 219 yards
Duke	Rushing	Riley Leonard	13 rushes, 97 yards, 2 TD
Duke	Receiving	Jalon Calhoun	5 receptions, 112 yards

=== Minnesota ===
	1	2	3	4	OT	Total
Golden Gophers	7	17	7	0	3	34
Wildcats	0	7	3	21	6	37

Statistics	MINN	NU
First downs	15	25
Total yards	397	492
Rushing yards	244	92
Passing yards	153	400
Turnovers	0	1
Time of possession	30:10	29:50

Team	Category	Player	Statistics
Minnesota	Passing	Athan Kaliakmanis	14/19, 153 yards, 2 TD
Minnesota	Rushing	Darius Taylor	31 rushes, 198 yards, 2 TD
Minnesota	Receiving	Daniel Jackson	4 receptions, 53 yards, TD
Northwestern	Passing	Ben Bryant	33/49, 396 yards, 4 TD
Northwestern	Rushing	Cam Porter	16 rushes, 56 yards, TD
Northwestern	Receiving	Bryce Kirtz	10 receptions, 215 yards, 2 TD

=== No. 6 Penn State ===
	1	2	3	4	Total
No. 6 Nittany Lions	3	7	17	14	41
Wildcats	3	7	0	3	13

Statistics	PSU	NU
First downs	19	12
Total yards	353	175
Rushing yards	134	45
Passing yards	219	130
Turnovers	1	1
Time of possession	32:08	27:52

Team	Category	Player	Statistics
Penn State	Passing	Drew Allar	18/33, 189 yards, TD
Penn State	Rushing	Nicholas Singleton	21 rushes, 80 yards, TD
Penn State	Receiving	KeAndre Lambert-Smith	4 receptions, 86 yards
Northwestern	Passing	Ben Bryant	14/25, 122 yards
Northwestern	Rushing	Brendan Sullivan	7 rushes, 25 yards
Northwestern	Receiving	Camron Johnson	6 receptions, 81 yards

=== Howard ===
	1	2	3	4	Total
Bison	0	0	7	13	20
Wildcats	9	7	7	0	23

Statistics	HOW	NU
First downs	18	21
Total yards	331	312
Rushing yards	162	181
Passing yards	169	131
Turnovers	0	0
Time of possession	29:34	30:26

Team	Category	Player	Statistics
Howard	Passing	Quinton Williams	18/30, 169 yards
Howard	Rushing	Eden James	21 rushes, 177 yards, TD
Howard	Receiving	Richie Ilarraza	7 receptions, 65 yards
Northwestern	Passing	Brendan Sullivan	13/18, 131 yards, 2 TD
Northwestern	Rushing	Cam Porter	18 rushes, 78 yards
Northwestern	Receiving	Camron Johnson	4 receptions, 55 yards, TD

=== At Nebraska ===
	1	2	3	4	Total
Wildcats	3	3	0	3	9
Cornhuskers	3	7	0	7	17

Statistics	NU	NEB
First downs	12	14
Total yards	257	248
Rushing yards	81	163
Passing yards	176	85
Turnovers	1	2
Time of possession	30:52	29:08

Team	Category	Player	Statistics
Northwestern	Passing	Brendan Sullivan	12/23, 176 yards, INT
Northwestern	Rushing	Anthony Tyus III	6 rushes, 63 yards
Northwestern	Receiving	Bryce Kirtz	3 receptions, 96 yards
Nebraska	Passing	Heinrich Haarberg	8/17, 85 yards, TD, 2 INT
Nebraska	Rushing	Emmett Johnson	12 rushes, 73 yards
Nebraska	Receiving	Malachi Coleman	1 reception, 44 yards, TD

=== Maryland ===
	1	2	3	4	Total
Terrapins	14	3	3	7	27
Wildcats	14	10	3	6	33

Statistics	MD	NU
First downs	25	19
Total yards	391	364
Rushing yards	117	99
Passing yards	274	265
Turnovers	2	0
Time of possession	29:13	30:47

Team	Category	Player	Statistics
Maryland	Passing	Taulia Tagovailoa	30/47, 274 yards, 3 TD, INT
Maryland	Rushing	Colby McDonald	5 rushes, 43 yards
Maryland	Receiving	Jeshaun Jones	9 receptions, 78 yards, TD
Northwestern	Passing	Brendan Sullivan	16/23, 265 yards, 2 TD
Northwestern	Rushing	Brendan Sullivan	14 rushes, 56 yards
Northwestern	Receiving	Joseph Himon II	2 receptions, 67 yards

=== Iowa ===
	1	2	3	4	Total
Hawkeyes	0	0	7	3	10
Wildcats	0	0	0	7	7

Statistics	IOWA	NU
First downs	14	12
Total yards	169	170
Rushing yards	104	89
Passing yards	65	81
Turnovers	1	0
Time of possession	30:18	29:42

Team	Category	Player	Statistics
Iowa	Passing	Deacon Hill	10/15, 65 yards, TD, INT
Iowa	Rushing	Leshon Williams	24 rushes, 79 yards
Iowa	Receiving	Kaleb Brown	1 reception, 23 yards
Northwestern	Passing	Brendan Sullivan	12/19, 81 yards, TD
Northwestern	Rushing	Anthony Tyus III	10 rushes, 40 yards
Northwestern	Receiving	A. J. Henning	4 receptions, 13 yards

=== At Wisconsin ===
	1	2	3	4	Total
Wildcats	7	17	0	0	24
Badgers	3	0	0	7	10

Statistics	NU	WIS
First downs	18	17
Total yards	324	341
Rushing yards	129	86
Passing yards	195	255
Turnovers	0	1
Time of possession	32:10	27:50

Team	Category	Player	Statistics
Northwestern	Passing	Ben Bryant	18/26, 195 yards, 2 TD
Northwestern	Rushing	Cam Porter	18 rushes, 72 yards
Northwestern	Receiving	A. J. Henning	3 receptions, 70 yards, TD
Wisconsin	Passing	Tanner Mordecai	31/45, 255 yards
Wisconsin	Rushing	Cade Yacamelli	9 rushes, 47 yards
Wisconsin	Receiving	Will Pauling	10 receptions, 96 yards

=== Purdue ===
	1	2	3	4	Total
Boilermakers	0	0	7	8	15
Wildcats	6	0	10	7	23

Statistics	PUR	NU
First downs	21	12
Total yards	443	329
Rushing yards	303	99
Passing yards	140	230
Turnovers	4	1
Time of possession	34:43	25:17

Team	Category	Player	Statistics
Purdue	Passing	Ryan Browne	12/16, 104 yards, 2 INT
Purdue	Rushing	Tyrone Tracy Jr.	16 rushes, 160 yards, TD
Purdue	Receiving	Devin Mockobee	3 receptions, 44 yards
Northwestern	Passing	Ben Bryant	13/24, 230 yards, TD, INT
Northwestern	Rushing	Cam Porter	17 rushes, 95 yards, 2 TD
Northwestern	Receiving	Camron Johnson	3 receptions, 88 yards, TD

=== At Illinois ===
	1	2	3	4	Total
Wildcats	7	14	7	17	45
Fighting Illini	3	17	3	20	43

Statistics	NU	ILL
First downs	20	20
Total yards	379	455
Rushing yards	145	107
Passing yards	234	348
Turnovers	2	4
Time of possession	29:50	30:10

Team	Category	Player	Statistics
Northwestern	Passing	Ben Bryant	24/32, 234 yards, 2 TD, 2 INT
Northwestern	Rushing	Cam Porter	16 rushes, 69 yards
Northwestern	Receiving	Camron Johnson	7 receptions, 124 yards, TD
Illinois	Passing	John Paddock	24/34, 334 yards, 3 TD, 2 INT
Illinois	Rushing	Reggie Love III	23 rushes, 106 yards
Illinois	Receiving	Casey Washington	9 receptions, 218 yards, 3 TD

=== Vs. Utah (Las Vegas Bowl) ===
	1	2	3	4	Total
Utes	0	0	0	7	7
Wildcats	0	7	0	7	14

Statistics	UTAH	NU
First downs	13	18
Total yards	211	290
Rushing yards	138	65
Passing yards	73	225
Turnovers	3	0
Time of possession	34:21	25:39

Team	Category	Player	Statistics
Utah	Passing	Bryson Barnes	8/13, 55 yards, 2 INT
Utah	Rushing	Ja'Quinden Jackson	8 rushes, 55 yards
Utah	Receiving	Micah Bernard	3 receptions, 24 yards
Northwestern	Passing	Ben Bryant	23/34, 222 yards, 2 TD
Northwestern	Rushing	Cam Porter	10 rushes, 33 yards
Northwestern	Receiving	Bryce Kirtz	5 receptions, 68 yards, TD

== Roster ==
2023 Northwestern Wildcats football team roster
Players
Coaches
Offense

Pos.	#	Name	Class
QB	0	Cole Freeman	Jr
WR	1	Jack Kennedy	Sr
QB	2	Ben Bryant	GS
QB	3	Ryan Hilinski	Sr
RB	4	Cam Porter	Sr
WR	5	Jacob Gill	Jr
QB	6	Brendan Sullivan	Jr
WR	8	A. J. Henning	Sr
QB	9	Aidan Gray	Fr
WR	10	Ricky Ahumaraeze	Fr
WR	11	Donnie Gray	Jr
QB	12	Jack Lausch	So
WR	13	Preston Bacon	Sr
WR	14	Cam Johnson	GS
WR	15	Calvin Johnson II	Jr
WR	16	Frank Covey IV	Fr
WR	17	Bryce Kirtz	Sr
TE	18	Camp Magee	Fr
WR	19	Reggie Fleurima	So
RB	20	Joseph Himon II	So
WR	23	Raymond Niro III	GS
RB	25	Caleb Komolafe	Fr
RB	27	Anthony Tyus III	Jr
RB	29	Marcus Cisco	Sr
RB	31	Jake Arthurs	Sr
RB	36	Payton Roth	Fr
RB	39	Albert Kunickis III	So
OL	56	Josh Thompson	Jr
OL	62	Alex Doost	Fr
OL	63	Dom D'Antonio	Sr
OL	64	Anthony Birsa	Fr
OL	65	Jackson Carsello	Jr
OL	66	Braeden Edwards	Jr
OL	68	Josh Priebe	Sr
OL	71	Ben Wrather	Sr
OL	72	Caleb Tiernan	Jr
OL	73	Deuce McGuire	So
OL	74	Nick Herzog	So
OL	75	Jordan Knox	Fr
OL	78	Luke Trifunovic	Sr
OL	79	Zachary Franks	Sr
TE	81	Chris Petrucci	So
WR	82	Quintin O'Connell	GS
TE	83	Blake Van Buren	So
TE	84	Hunter Welcing	Sr
TE	86	Lawson Albright	Jr
TE	87	Jack Fitzgerald	Fr
TE	87	Thomas Gordon	Sr
TE	88	Marshall Lang	Sr
TE	89	Charlie Mangieri	GS
TE	98	Duke Olges	Sr

Defense

Pos.	#	Name	Class
DB	0	Coco Azema	Sr
DB	2	Garnett Hollis Jr.	Sr
DB	3	Jaheem Joseph	Sr
DB	6	Robert Fitzgerald	So
DB	7	Ore Adeyi	Jr
DB	9	Devin Turner	So
DB	10	Theran Johnson	Jr
DB	12	Nigel Williams	Sr
DB	13	Josh Fussell	Fr
DB	16	Cole Shivers	Fr
DB	18	Garner Wallace	Jr
DB	19	J. J. Lewis	Fr
DB	21	Damon Walters	Fr
DB	22	Evan Smith	So
DB	24	Rod Heard II	Sr
DB	26	Jalen Lewis	Fr
DB	27	Jack Oyola	So
DB	28	Braden Turner	So
LB	32	Bryce Gallagher	Sr
LB	33	Braydon Brus	So
LB	34	Xander Mueller	Sr
LB	35	Kenny Soares Jr.	So
LB	37	Mac Uihlein	Jr
DB	38	Joe DeHaan	Sr
LB	40	Jason Reynolds II	So
DL	41	Jaylen Pate	GS
DL	42	Anto Saka	So
LB	44	Khalid Jones	Sr
LB	45	Cullen Coleman	Sr
LB	46	Johnny McGuire	Fr
LB	48	Owen Bergin	Sr
DL	50	P. J. Spencer	Sr
LB	51	Miles Crutchley	So
DL	52	Richie Hagarty	GS
DL	53	Jaiden Cameron	Sr
DL	54	Tyler Gant	Fr
DL	55	Dylan Roberts	Fr
LB	57	Greyson Metz	Sr
DL	59	Mason Green	Fr
DL	90	Carmine Bastone	Jr
DL	91	Aidan Hubbard	Jr
DL	92	Matt Lawson	GS
DL	93	Brendan Flakes	So
DL	94	R. J. Pearson	GS
DL	95	Najee Story	Jr
DL	96	Michael Kilbane	Fr
DL	97	Sean McLaughlin	Sr

Special teams

Pos.	#	Name	Class
LS	43	Will Halkyard	Sr
P	47	Luke Akers	Sr
K	49	Jacob Tabibian	Jr
K	82	Jack Olsen	Sr
K	94	Henry Helms	Fr
P	99	Hunter Renner	Sr

Head coach

- David Braun

Coordinators/assistant coaches

- Armon Binns – Wide receivers
- Chris Foster – Running backs
- LaMarcus Hicks – Cornerbacks
- Tim McGarigle – Linebackers
- Christian Smith – Defensive linemen
- D. J. Vokolek – Assistant coach
- Skip Holtz – Special assistant to the head coach
- Chris Batti – Defensive quality control
- Zach Opsal – Offensive quality control
- Duke DeRae – Graduate assistant
- Riley Lees – Graduate assistant

Legend

- (C) Team captain
- (S) Suspended
- (I) Ineligible
- Injured
- Redshirt

Roster
