= Micah Bernard =

American football player (born 2001)

Profile
- Position: Running back

Personal information
- Born: October 22, 2001 (age 25); Cerritos, California, U.S.
- Listed height: 5 ft 10 in (1.78 m)
- Listed weight: 199 lb (90 kg)

Career information
- High school: Gahr (Cerritos, California)
- College: Utah (2019–2024)
- NFL draft: 2025: undrafted

Career history
- Tennessee Titans (2025)*; New England Patriots (2025)*; Hamilton Tiger-Cats (2026)*
- * Offseason or practice squad member only

Micah Bernard (MA-kai-BER-nard; born October 22, 2001) is an American professional football running back. He played college football for the Utah Utes.

== Early life ==
Bernard attended Gahr High School in Cerritos, California. He was rated as a three-star recruit and committed to play college football for the Utah Utes.

== College career ==
In his first two collegiate seasons in 2019 and 2020, Bernard played in nine games, running for 76 yards on 15 carries and totaling four receptions for 25 yards. In 2021, he rushed for 523 yards and two touchdowns on 87 carries and hauled in 26 receptions for 251 yards and two touchdowns. Bernard finished the 2022 season rushing 106 times for 533 yards and four touchdowns and notching 34 receptions for 314 yards and a touchdown. After missing the majority of the 2023 season, he returned to the team's bowl game where he rushed nine times for 31 yards and a touchdown in a loss to Northwestern. During the 2023 season, Bernard played in just two games due to injury, where he rushed 16 times for 76 yards and a touchdown, while also making five catches for 30 yards. In week 2 of the 2024 season, he rushed 19 times for 118 yards and caught a touchdown in a win over Baylor. In week 4, Bernard rushed 25 times for a career-high 182 yards in a win over Oklahoma State, earning Big 12 Conference offensive player of the week honors. In week 7, he rushed for 129 yards and a touchdown in a 27–19 loss to Arizona State.

== Professional career ==
Pre-draft measurables
Height	Weight	Arm length	Hand span	40-yard dash	20-yard shuttle	Three-cone drill	Vertical jump	Broad jump	Bench press
5 ft 10 in (1.78 m)	199 lb (90 kg)	31 5/8 in (0.80 m)	9 1/4 in (0.23 m)	4.58 s	4.37 s	7.39 s	38.5 in (0.98 m)	10 ft 6 in (3.20 m)	14 reps
All values from Pro Day

=== Tennessee Titans ===
On May 8, 2025, Bernard signed with the Tennessee Titans as an undrafted free agent after going unselected in the 2025 NFL draft. He was waived on June 2, following the signing of Tyrion Davis-Price.

=== New England Patriots ===
On August 19, 2025, Bernard signed with the New England Patriots; however, he was released by the team three days later.

=== Hamilton Tiger-Cats ===
On April 16, 2026, Bernard signed with the Hamilton Tiger-Cats of the Canadian Football League (CFL). He was released on May 10.
