= Ben Bryant (American football) =

American football player (born 1999)

Profile
- Position: Quarterback

Personal information
- Born: September 17, 1999 (age 27); La Grange, Illinois, U.S.
- Listed height: 6 ft 3 in (1.91 m)
- Listed weight: 220 lb (100 kg)

Career information
- High school: Lyons Township (La Grange)
- College: Cincinnati (2018–2020, 2022); Eastern Michigan (2021); Northwestern (2023)
- NFL draft: 2024: undrafted

Career history
- New York Jets (2024)*
- * Offseason or practice squad member only

Ben Bryant (born September 17, 1999) is an American professional football quarterback. He played college football for the Cincinnati Bearcats, Eastern Michigan Eagles, and Northwestern Wildcats.

== Early life ==
Bryant grew up in La Grange, Illinois, and attended high school at Lyons Township High School. He was rated a three-star recruit and initially committed to play college football for the Wisconsin Badgers. His scholarship offer was eventually pulled, reportedly after tweeting about receiving an offer from another school. Bryant ultimately signed a letter of intent to play at Cincinnati.

== College career ==
=== Cincinnati (First stint) ===
Bryant played in one game before redshirting his true freshman season at Cincinnati. He spent his redshirt freshman season primarily as the backup to starter Desmond Ridder but started the Bearcats' final regular season game against Memphis after Ridder suffered an injury. Bryant finished the season with 29 completions on 51 pass attempts for 388 yards with one touchdown and two interceptions in seven games played. He also spent the 2020 season as Ridder's backup and passed for 90 yards and one touchdown while rushing for 65 yards and one touchdown.

=== Eastern Michigan ===
Following the end of the 2020 season, Bryant transferred to Eastern Michigan. He completed 68.4% of his passes for 3,121 yards with 14 touchdowns and seven interceptions. At the end of the season Bryant re-entered the NCAA transfer portal.

=== Cincinnati (Second stint) ===
Bryant opted to return to Cincinnati and was eligible to play immediately as a graduate transfer. He was named the starter for the Bearcats' season opener against Arkansas. Bryant started 11 games and passed for 2,732 yards with 21 touchdowns and seven interceptions before suffering a season-ending foot injury. After the Bearcats' 2023 spring practices, he entered the transfer portal for a third time.

=== Northwestern ===
On May 5, 2023, Bryant announced his intention to transfer to Northwestern. With the Wildcats, he started 9 games and won 6 of them. In a 41-13 loss vs Penn State, he suffered a right shoulder injury that sat him out for 4 games. In his first game back from injury, Northwestern upset Wisconsin 24-10.

=== Statistics ===
Year	Team	Games			Passing								Rushing			
Year	Team	GP	GS	Record	Cmp	Att	Pct	Yds	Avg	TD	Int	Rtg	Att	Yds	Avg	TD
2018	Cincinnati	1	0	0−0	6	8	75.0	75	9.4	0	1	128.8	2	-4	-2.0	0
2019	Cincinnati	5	1	0−1	29	51	56.9	388	7.6	1	2	119.4	22	35	1.6	1
2020	Cincinnati	5	0	0−0	11	14	78.6	90	6.4	1	0	156.1	6	65	10.8	1
2021	Eastern Michigan	13	11	6−5	279	408	68.4	3,121	7.6	14	7	140.5	87	-43	-0.5	2
2022	Cincinnati	11	11	9−2	213	348	61.2	2,732	7.9	21	7	143.0	47	-118	-2.5	0
2023	Northwestern	9	9	6-3	173	277	62.5	1,807	6.5	13	6	128.4	60	-33	-0.6	4
Career		44	32	21−11	711	1106	64.3	8,212	7.4	50	23	137.4	224	-98	-0.4	8

== Professional career ==
Pre-draft measurables
Height	Weight	Arm length	Hand span	40-yard dash	10-yard split	20-yard split	20-yard shuttle	Three-cone drill	Vertical jump	Broad jump
6 ft 3 1/2 in (1.92 m)	218 lb (99 kg)	32 1/4 in (0.82 m)	10 in (0.25 m)	5.02 s	1.69 s	2.88 s	4.46 s	7.30 s	27.0 in (0.69 m)	9 ft 1 in (2.77 m)
All values from Pro Day

Bryant went unselected in the 2024 NFL draft. On July 25, 2024, Bryant signed with the New York Jets. He was waived two days later, after the team signed Adrian Martinez.
