= Camron Johnson =

American football player (born 1999)

No. 87 – Carolina Panthers
- Position: Wide receiver
- Roster status: Practice squad

Personal information
- Born: April 12, 1999 (age 27); Henderson, Kentucky, U.S.
- Listed height: 6 ft 0 in (1.83 m)
- Listed weight: 202 lb (92 kg)

Career information
- High school: Brentwood Academy (Brentwood, Tennessee)
- College: Vanderbilt (2018–2021); Arizona State (2022); Northwestern (2023)
- NFL draft: 2024: undrafted

Career history
- Dallas Cowboys (2024)*; Carolina Panthers (2024–present)*
- * Offseason or practice squad member only
- Stats at Pro Football Reference

Camron "Cam" Blais Johnson (born April 12, 1999) is an American professional football wide receiver for the Carolina Panthers of the National Football League (NFL). He played college football at Vanderbilt, Arizona State, and Northwestern.

== Early life ==
Johnson attended Brentwood Academy in Brentwood, Tennessee. At Brentwood, Johnson was a four-time all-state, four-time all-region and three-time state champion in football. He lettered in football, basketball and track, and won a combined 13 state titles. A four-star recruit, Johnson committed to play college football at Vanderbilt University over offers from Auburn and LSU.

== College career ==
In 2018, Johnson saw action in four games as a true freshman before suffering a season-ending lower leg injury while blocking in a game against South Carolina. Johnson returned from his injury in 2019, starting in nine games, recording over 300 yards receiving and three touchdowns. Following the conclusion of the 2021 season, Johnson entered the transfer portal.

On May 7, 2022, Johnson announced his decision to transfer to Arizona State University to play for the Arizona State Sun Devils. He played sparingly in one season with the Sun Devils, before entering the transfer portal for the second time.

On January 18, 2023, Johnson announced his decision to transfer to Northwestern University to play for the Northwestern Wildcats.

== Professional career ==
Pre-draft measurables
Height	Weight	Arm length	Hand span	40-yard dash	10-yard split	20-yard split	20-yard shuttle	Three-cone drill	Vertical jump	Broad jump
6 ft 0 in (1.83 m)	202 lb (92 kg)	31 1/8 in (0.79 m)	9 3/8 in (0.24 m)	4.62 s	1.59 s	2.63 s	4.22 s	7.00 s	37.0 in (0.94 m)	10 ft 4 in (3.15 m)
All values from Pro Day

In May 2024, Johnson signed with the Dallas Cowboys as an undrafted free agent. He was waived on August 26.
