= 2023 UCLA Bruins football team =

American college football season

2023 UCLA Bruins football

LA Bowl champion

LA Bowl, W 35–22 vs. Boise State
- Conference: Pac-12 Conference
- Record: 8–5 (4–5 Pac-12)
- Head coach: Chip Kelly (6th season)
- Offensive scheme: Spread option
- Defensive coordinator: D'Anton Lynn (1st season)
- Base defense: 4–3
- Home stadium: Rose Bowl

Uniform
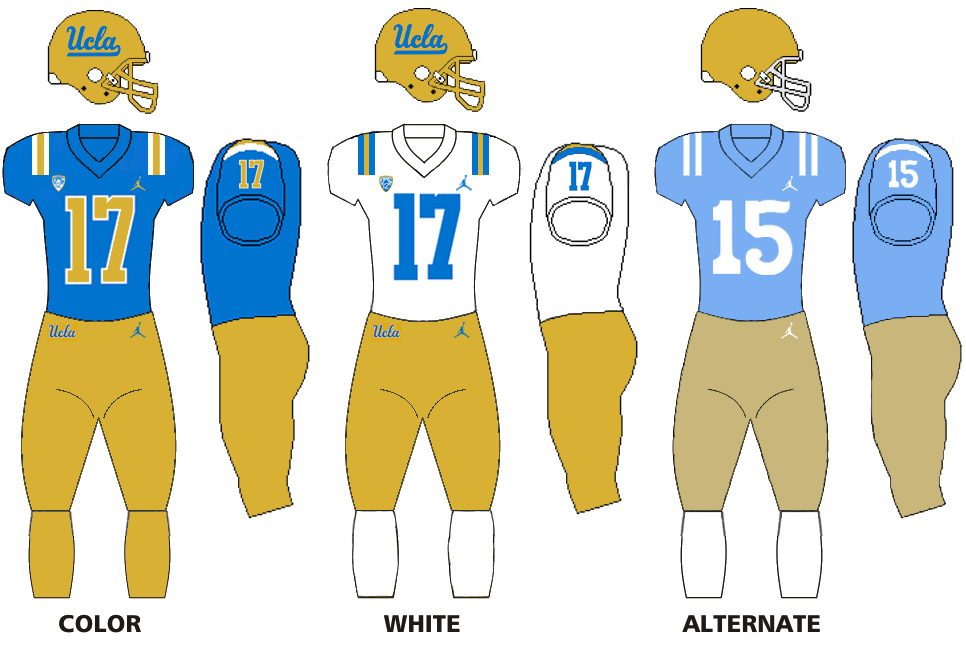

2023 Pac-12 Conference football standings
	Conf.			Overall
Team	W		L	W		L
No. 2 Washington y$^	9	–	0	14	–	1
No. 6 Oregon y	8	–	1	12	–	2
No. 11 Arizona	7	–	2	10	–	3
Oregon State	5	–	4	8	–	5
Utah	5	–	4	8	–	5
USC	5	–	4	8	–	5
California	4	–	5	6	–	7
UCLA	4	–	5	8	–	5
Washington State	2	–	7	5	–	7
Stanford	2	–	7	3	–	9
Arizona State*	2	–	7	3	–	9
Colorado	1	–	8	4	–	8
Championship: Washington 34, Oregon 31
^ – College Football Playoff participant; $ – Conference champion; y – Championship game participant; * – Ineligible for postseason play due to self-imposed ban for 2020 recruiting violations; Rankings from AP Poll

The 2023 UCLA Bruins football team represented the University of California, Los Angeles in the Pac-12 Conference during the 2023 NCAA Division I FBS football season. The Bruins were led by Chip Kelly in his sixth and final season at UCLA. They played their home games at the Rose Bowl in Pasadena, California. The season was the team's last season as members of Pac-12 before joining the Big Ten Conference in 2024.

UCLA finished the regular season with a 7–5 record, losing three of their last four. They won the LA Bowl over Boise State for their first bowl win in Kelly's six-year tenure and the Bruins' first since 2015. UCLA finished 8–5 for their third consecutive eight-win season and the program's second such streak since 1988.

Following the season on February 9, 2024, Kelly resigned to take the offensive coordinator position with Ohio State.

The UCLA Bruins football team drew an average home attendance of 47,951 in 2023.

== Offseason ==
On January 24, 2023, UCLA announced that it was hiring Kodi Whitfield as its new cornerbacks coach. On February 27, the school announced that it was hiring D'Anton Lynn as its defensive coordinator. Bill McGovern, director of football administration and former defensive coordinator, died on May 30, 2023.

=== Incoming transfers ===
- ATH Anthony Adkins – Army
- S Jordan Anderson – Bowling Green
- WR Kyle Ford – USC
- K Blake Glessner – Montana State
- LB Jake Heimlicher – Penn
- IOL Spencer Holstege – Purdue
- OT Khadere Kounta – Old Dominion
- TE Moliki Matavao – Oregon
- LB Femi M. Oladejo – California
- QB Collin Schlee – Kent State
- RB Carson Steele – Ball State
- WR J. Michael Sturdivant – California
- OL Jake Wiley – Colorado
- DL Keanu Williams – Oregon

=== Outgoing transfers ===
- K Nicholas Barr-Mira – Mississippi State
- OL Baraka Beckett – Campbell
- RB Christian Grubb – Portland State
- EDGE Hayden Harris – Montana
- DB Martell Irby – Arizona
- DL Tyler Manoa – Arizona
- LB Jake Newman – TBD
- WR Matt Sykes – Rice
- LB Jeremiah Trojan – Northern Arizona
- CB Jelani Warren – Montana

== Preseason ==
- Duke Clemens named to the Football Writers Association of America (FWAA) 2023 Outland Trophy watch list
- Laiatu Latu named to the Football Writers Association of America (FWAA) 2023 Nagurski Trophy watch list
- Chase Griffin was named to The Wuerffel Trophy watch list
- Duke Clemens was named to the Rimington Trophy (most outstanding center) watch list
- Carsen Ryan named to the Mackey Award (most outstanding tight end) watch list
- J. Michael Sturdivant was placed on the Biletnikoff Award (outstanding receiver) watch list
- Carson Steele named to the Doak Walker Award (top running back) watch list
- Darius Muasau named to the Butkus Award (top linebacker) watch list
- Laiatu Latu named to the Bednarik Award (defensive player) watch list
- Kam Brown was named to the Earl Campbell Tyler Rose Award (top offensive player) watch list
- Laiatu Latu was named to the second-team of The Sporting News' College Football All-America Team
- Dante Moore was selected to the Shaun Alexander Freshman of the Year Award watch list

== Schedule ==
Date	Time	Opponent	Rank	Site	TV	Result	Attendance
September 2	7:30 p.m.	Coastal Carolina*		Rose Bowl; Pasadena, CA	ESPN	W 27–13	43,705
September 9	4:30 p.m.	at San Diego State*		Snapdragon Stadium; San Diego, CA	CBS	W 35–10	32,017
September 16	2:00 p.m.	No. 17 (FCS) North Carolina Central*	No. 24	Rose Bowl; Pasadena, CA	P12N	W 59–7	38,343
September 23	12:30 p.m.	at No. 11 Utah	No. 22	Rice-Eccles Stadium; Salt Lake City, UT	FOX	L 7–14	52,919
October 7	12:00 p.m.	No. 13 Washington State		Rose Bowl; Pasadena, CA	P12N	W 25–17	35,437
October 14	5:00 p.m.	at No. 15 Oregon State	No. 18	Reser Stadium; Corvallis, OR	FOX	L 24–36	37,600
October 21	7:30 p.m.	at Stanford	No. 25	Stanford Stadium; Stanford, CA (rivalry)	ESPN	W 42–7	30,225
October 28	4:30 p.m.	Colorado^{†}	No. 23	Rose Bowl; Pasadena, CA	ABC	W 28–16	71,343
November 4	7:30 p.m.	at Arizona	No. 19	Arizona Stadium; Tucson, AZ	FS1	L 10–27	44,956
November 11	6:00 p.m.	Arizona State		Rose Bowl; Pasadena, CA (Veteran & Armed Forces Appreciation)	P12N	L 7–17	56,436
November 18	12:30 p.m.	at USC		Los Angeles Memorial Coliseum; Los Angeles, CA (Victory Bell)	ABC	W 38–20	72,243
November 25	7:30 p.m.	California		Rose Bowl; Pasadena, CA (rivalry, Senior Day Celebration)	ESPN	L 7–33	42,439
December 16	4:30 p.m.	vs. Boise State		SoFi Stadium; Inglewood, CA (LA Bowl)	ABC	W 35–22	32,780
*Non-conference game; ^{†}Homecoming; Rankings from AP Poll (and CFP Rankings, after October 31) - Released prior to game; All times are in Pacific time

== Roster ==
2023 UCLA Bruins football team roster
Players
Coaches
Offense

Pos.	#	Name	Class
WR	0	Kam Brown	Sr
WR	1	J. Michael Sturdivant	So
WR	2	Titus Mokiao-Atimalala	Jr
QB	3	Dante Moore	Fr
WR	4	Ethan Garbers	Jr
QB	6	Justyn Martin	Fr
WR	7	Carter Shaw	Fr
RB	7	Colson Yankoff	Sr
QB	9	Collin Schlee	Jr
WR	10	Ryan Cragun	Sr
QB	11	Chase Griffin	Sr
QB	12	Luke Duncan	Fr
WR	14	Josiah Norwood	Sr
WR	15	Braden Pegan	Fr
WR	17	Logan Loya	Sr
WR	18	Jadyn Marshall	Fr
WR	19	Kyle Ford	Sr
RB	20	Carsen Ryan	So
WR	21	Bradley Schlom	Jr
WR	22	Keegan Jones	Sr
RB	23	Anthony Adkins	Jr
WR	24	Jerry McClure	Fr
RB	25	T. J. Harden	So
WR	25	Ezavier Staples	So
RB	26	Brian Kowall	Jr
RB	27	Isaiah Carlson	Fr
RB	28	Jack Pedersen	Fr
RB	30	Minaya Olivo	Fr
RB	31	Deshun Murrell	So
RB	32	Troy Leigber	Fr
RB	33	Carson Steele	Jr
WR	35	Devanti Dillard	Jr
WR	37	Elijah Rodriguez	Fr
OL	52	Benjamin Roy Jr.	So
OL	53	Khadere Kounta	Sr
OL	54	Josh Carlin	Sr
OL	56	Tavake Tuikolovatu	Fr
OL	59	Siale Taupaki	Sr
OL	61	Jack Clarke	Fr
OL	62	Duke Clemens	Sr
OL	63	Kory Symington	Fr
OL	64	Sam Yoon	Fr
OL	65	Devin Delgado	So
OL	66	Niki Prongos	Fr
OL	67	Yutaka Mahe	So
OL	68	Noah Pulealii	So
OL	69	Justin Williams	Jr
OL	70	Caleb Walker	Fr
OL	71	Jake Wiley	Sr
OL	72	Garrett DiGiorgio	So
OL	74	Spencer Holstege	Jr
OL	75	Bruno Fina	Jr
OL	77	Jaylan Jeffers	Jr
TE	81	Hudson Habermehl	Sr
TE	82	Sam Summa	So
WR	85	Grant Gray	Fr
TE	87	Grant Norberg	Jr
TE	88	Moliki Matavao	So
TE	89	Michael Churich	Sr

Defense

Pos.	#	Name	Class
DB	0	Jordan Anderson	Sr
LB	1	Ale Kaho	Sr
LB	2	Oluwafemi Oladejo	Jr
DB	3	Devin Kirkwood	Jr
DL	4	Carl Jones Jr.	Sr
DB	6	John Humphrey	Sr
DB	7	Mo Osling III	Sr
DL	9	Choé Bryant-Strother	Jr
DB	10	Joshua Swift	Jr
DL	11	Gabriel Murphy	Jr
DL	12	Grayson Murphy	Jr
DB	14	Clint Stephens	Fr
LB	15	Laiatu Latu	Sr
LB	17	Jalen Woods	Fr
DB	18	R. J. Jones	Fr
DB	19	D. J. Justice	So
LB	20	Kain Medrano	Sr
LB	21	JonJon Vaughns	Sr
DB	22	Croix Stewart	Fr
DB	23	Kenny Churchwell III	Sr
DB	24	Jaylin Davies	So
DB	26	Zeke Thomas	Jr
DB	27	Kamari Ramsey	Fr
DB	28	Josiah Gonzales	So
DB	29	Evan Thomas	Jr
DB	30	Jaxon Harley	Fr
DB	30	Donavyn Pellot	Fr
DB	31	Isaiah Newcombe	So
DB	32	William Nimmo Jr.	Sr
LB	33	Ty Lee	Fr
DB	33	Kanye Clark	Fr
DB	36	Alex Johnson	Sr
DB	37	Joshua Dixon	Fr
DB	39	Kaleb Tuliau	Sr
LB	40	Mone Malafu	Fr
LB	41	Devin Aupiu	Jr
LB	44	Larry Edwards III	Fr
DB	45	Marquise Villahermosa	Fr
LB	47	Wyatt Mosier	Fr
LB	48	Joquarri Price	Jr
LB	49	Carson Schwesinger	So
DL	51	Jake Heimlicher	Sr
LB	53	Darius Muasau	Sr
DL	55	A. J. Fuimaono	Fr
DL	57	Peter Bario	Fr
LB	58	Gary Smith III	Sr
DL	59	Tannen Vagle	Sr
DL	88	Grant Buckey	Fr
DL	91	Michael Sullivan	Jr
DL	92	Quintin Somerville	So
DL	93	Jay Toia	Jr
DL	94	Dovid Magna	Sr
DL	95	Sitiveni Havili-Kaufusi	Sr
DL	99	Keanu Williams	So

Special teams

Pos.	#	Name	Class
K	39	Blake Glessner	Jr
P	45	Chase Barry	Fr
P	46	Will Powers	Sr
LS	50	Salem Wahab	So
LS	60	Beau Gardner	Jr
LS	90	Marcus MacNeal	Fr
K	93	R. J. Lopez	Sr
K	96	Ari Libenson	Jr
K	97	Joseph Firebaugh Jr.	So
LS	98	Trent Middleton	Fr
K	99	Kalen Jones	Fr

Head coach

- Chip Kelly

Coordinators/assistant coaches

- Brian Norwood – Assistant head coach/Passing game coordinator/Safeties
- D'Anton Lynn – Defensive coordinator
- Ikaika Malloe – Defensive line/Outside linebackers
- DeShaun Foster – Running backs
- Tim Drevno – Offensive line
- Jerry Neuheisel – Wide receivers
- Ryan Gunderson – Quarterbacks
- Jeff Faris – Tight ends
- Ken Norton Jr. – Inside linebackers
- Kodi Whitfield – Cornerbacks
- Keith Belton – Director, football performance

Legend

- (C) Team captain
- (S) Suspended
- (I) Ineligible
- Injured
- Redshirt

Roster
Last update: 9/15/23

== Game summaries ==
=== vs Coastal Carolina ===
Coastal Carolina Chanticleers (0–0) vs UCLA Bruins (0–0) – Game summary

Quarter	1	2	3	4	Total
Chanticleers	0	6	7	0	13
Bruins	7	7	0	13	27

at Rose Bowl • Pasadena, CA

- Date: September 2, 2023
- Game time: 7:35 p.m.
- Game weather: Cloudy, 70 °F (21 °C)
- Game attendance: 43,705
- Referee: John Love
- TV announcers (ESPN): Dave Flemming (play-by-play), Brock Osweiler (analyst), Kayla Burton (sideline)

Game information

First quarter

- (12:56) UCLA – Carsen Ryan 21-yard pass from Ethan Garbers, R. J. Lopez kick (Drive: 7 play, 78 yards, 2:04; UCLA 7–0)

Second quarter

- (11:12) CCU – Liam Gray 22-yard field goal (Drive: 16 plays, 75 yards, 6:33; UCLA 7–3)
- (3:57) UCLA – Carson Steele 14-yard pass from Dante Moore, R. J. Lopez kick (Drive: 6 plays, 61 yards, 2:36; UCLA 14–3)
- (0:00) CCU – Liam Gray 41-yard field goal (Drive: 13 plays, 51 yards, 3:57; UCLA 14–6)

Third quarter

- (10:08) CCU – Sam Pinckney 9-yard pass from Grayson McCall, Liam Gray kick (Drive: 9 plays, 75 yards, 4:52; UCLA 14–13)

Fourth quarter

- (13:59) UCLA – J. Michael Sturdivant 62-yard pass from Dante Moore, R. J. Lopez kick (Drive: 1 play, 62 yards, 0:08; UCLA 21–13)
- (5:39) UCLA – R. J. Lopez 31-yard field goal (Drive: 7 plays, 17 yards, 2:27; UCLA 24–13)
- (3:26) UCLA – R. J. Lopez 47-yard field goal (Drive: 4 plays, 3 yards, 0:59; UCLA 27–13)

Statistics	CCU	UCLA
First downs	21	19
Total yards	345	417
Rushes/yards	34–56	31–153
Passing yards	289	264
Passing: Comp–Att–Int	28–43–2	17–29–3
Time of possession	34:50	25:10

Team	Category	Player	Statistics
Coastal Carolina	Passing	Grayson McCall	27/42, 271 yards, TD, 2 INT
Coastal Carolina	Rushing	Reese White	8 carries, 21 yards
Coastal Carolina	Receiving	Sam Pinckney	9 receptions, 139 yards, TD
UCLA	Passing	Dante Moore	7/12, 143 yards, 2 TD, INT
UCLA	Rushing	Carson Steele	13 carries, 76 yards
UCLA	Receiving	J. Michael Sturdivant	5 receptions, 136 yards, TD

=== at San Diego State ===
UCLA Bruins (1–0) at San Diego State Aztecs (2–0) – Game summary

Quarter	1	2	3	4	Total
Bruins	7	21	7	0	35
Aztecs	7	3	0	0	10

at Snapdragon Stadium • San Diego, CA

- Date: September 9, 2023
- Game time: 4:30 p.m.
- Game weather: Sunny, 85 °F (29 °C)
- Game attendance: 32,017
- Referee: Cravonne Barrett
- TV announcers (CBS): Rich Waltz (play-by-play), Aaron Taylor (analyst), Justin Walters (sideline)

Game information

First quarter

- (7:26) UCLA – Josiah Norwood 81-yard pass from Dante Moore, R. J. Lopez kick (Drive: 1 play, 81 yards, 0:11; UCLA 7–0)
- (2:33) SDSU – Mekhi Shaw 21-yard pass from Jalen Mayden, Jack Browning kick (Drive: 9 plays, 75 yards, 4:53; Tied 7–7)

Second quarter

- (14:56) UCLA – Carson Steele 13-yard run, R. J. Lopez kick (Drive: 7 plays, 75 yards, 2:37; UCLA 14–7)
- (10:21) UCLA – T. J. Harden 59-yard run, R. J. Lopez kick (Drive: 3 plays, 68 yards, 1:01; UCLA 21–7)
- (5:03) SDSU – Jack Browning 44-yard field goal (Drive: 10 plays, 48 yards, 5:18; UCLA 21–10)
- (1:20) UCLA – Logan Loya 24-yard pass from Dante Moore, R. J. Lopez kick (Drive: 7 plays, 85 yards, 0:56; UCLA 28–10)

Third quarter

- (2:05) UCLA – Carsen Ryan 6-yard pass from Dante Moore, R. J. Lopez kick (Drive: 12 plays, 80 yards, 4:20; UCLA 35–10)

Fourth quarter

None

Statistics	UCLA	SDSU
First downs	26	17
Total yards	550	259
Rushes/yards	39–254	33–63
Passing yards	296	196
Passing: Comp–Att–Int	18–29–0	20–38–3
Time of possession	25:05	34:55

Team	Category	Player	Statistics
UCLA	Passing	Dante Moore	17/27, 290 yards, 3 TD
UCLA	Rushing	T. J. Harden	9 carries, 91 yards, TD
UCLA	Receiving	Josiah Norwood	2 receptions, 87 yards, TD
San Diego State	Passing	Jalen Mayden	19/37, 196 yards, TD, 3 INT
San Diego State	Rushing	Kenan Christon	9 carries, 27 yards
San Diego State	Receiving	Mekhi Shaw	5 receptions, 54 yards, TD

=== vs North Carolina Central ===
This is the first meeting between the two schools.

North Carolina Central Eagles (2–0) vs No. 24 UCLA Bruins (2–0) – Game summary

Quarter	1	2	3	4	Total
Eagles	0	0	0	7	7
No. 24 Bruins	35	10	14	0	59

at Rose Bowl • Pasadena, CA

- Date: September 16, 2023
- Game time: 2:00 p.m.
- Game weather: Cloudy, 72 °F (22 °C)
- Game attendance: 38,343
- Referee: Michael Marsh
- TV announcers (P12N): J. B. Long (play-by-play), Max Browne (analyst)

Game information

First quarter

- (14:42) UCLA – Kam Brown 67-yard pass from Dante Moore, R. J. Lopez kick (Drive: 1 play, 67 yards, 0:00; UCLA 7–0)
- (13:46) UCLA – Carson Steele 1-yard run, R. J. Lopez kick (Drive: 1 play, 1 yards, 0:05; UCLA 14–0)
- (7:38) UCLA – J. Michael Sturdivant 30-yard pass from Dante Moore, R. J. Lopez kick (Drive: 6 plays, 88 yards, 2:24; UCLA 21–0)
- (5:27) UCLA – Collin Schlee 57-yard run, R. J. Lopez kick (Drive: 1 play, 57 yards, 0:12; UCLA 28–0)
- (2:18) UCLA – Collin Schlee 45-yard run, R. J. Lopez kick (Drive: 3 plays, 45 yards, 1:17; UCLA 35–0)

Second quarter

- (9:33) UCLA – R. J. Lopez field goal (Drive: 13 plays, 76 yards, 5:14; UCLA 38–0)
- (4:34) UCLA – T. J. Harden 62-yard run, R. J. Lopez kick (Drive: 3 plays, 70 yards, 1:39; UCLA 45–0)

Third quarter

- (8:44) UCLA – Colson Yankoff 25-yard run, R. J. Lopez kick (Drive: 5 plays, 72 yards, 1:48; UCLA 52–0)
- (3:36) UCLA – Anthony Adkins 1-yard run, R. J. Lopez kick (Drive: 8 plays, 83 yards, 4:03; UCLA 59–0)

Fourth quarter

- (6:08) NCCU – Chris Mosley 1-yard run, R. J. Lopez kick (Drive: 14 plays, 56 yards, 7:08; UCLA 59–7)

Statistics	NCCU	UCLA
First downs	14	22
Total yards	245	614
Rushes/yards	37–103	39–404
Passing yards	142	210
Passing: Comp–Att–Int	31–17–1	17–10–1
Time of possession	36:13	23:47

Team	Category	Player	Statistics
North Carolina Central	Passing	Walker Harris	12/18, 114 yards
North Carolina Central	Rushing	Latrell Collier	14 carries, 48 yards
North Carolina Central	Receiving	Quentin McCall	4 receptions, 39 yards
UCLA	Passing	Dante Moore	8/12, 182 yards, 2 TD
UCLA	Rushing	Anthony Adkins	10 carries, 96 yards, TD
UCLA	Receiving	Kam Brown	2 receptions, 74 yards, TD

=== at No. 11 Utah ===
No. 22 UCLA Bruins (3–0) at No. 11 Utah Utes (3–0) – Game summary

Quarter	1	2	3	4	Total
No. 22 Bruins	0	0	0	7	7
No. 11 Utes	7	7	0	0	14

at Rice-Eccles Stadium • Salt Lake City, UT

- Date: September 23, 2023
- Game time: 12:30 p.m.
- Game weather: Sunny, 68 °F (20 °C)
- Game attendance: 52,919
- Referee: Mark Duddy
- TV announcers (FOX): Jason Benetti (play-by-play), Brock Huard (analyst), Allison Williams (sideline)

Game information

First quarter

- (14:48) UTAH – Karene Reid 21-yard interception return, Joey Cheek kick (Drive: 1 play, 0 yards, 0:07; Utah 7–0)

Second quarter

- (1:01) UTAH – Landen King 7-yard pass from Nate Johnson, Joey Cheek kick (Drive: 9 plays, 51 yards, 3:59; Utah 14–0)

Third quarter

None

Fourth quarter

- (3:39) UCLA – Josiah Norwood 17-yard pass from Dante Moore, R. J. Lopez kick (Drive: 9 plays, 91 yards, 4:29; Utah 14–7)

Statistics	UCLA	UTAH
First downs	11	13
Total yards	243	219
Rushes/yards	32–9	48–102
Passing yards	234	117
Passing: Comp–Att–Int	15–35–1	9–17–0
Time of possession	25:32	34:28

Team	Category	Player	Statistics
UCLA	Passing	Dante Moore	15/35, 234 yards, TD, INT
UCLA	Rushing	T. J. Harden	11 carries, 31 yards
UCLA	Receiving	Carsen Ryan	3 receptions, 69 yards
Utah	Passing	Nate Johnson	9/17, 117 yards, TD
Utah	Rushing	Jaylon Glover	25 carries, 85 yards
Utah	Receiving	Devaughn Vele	2 receptions, 57 yards

=== vs No. 13 Washington State ===
No. 13 Washington State Cougars (4–0) vs UCLA Bruins (3–1) – Game summary

Quarter	1	2	3	4	Total
No. 13 Cougars	3	7	7	0	17
Bruins	0	9	3	13	25

at Rose Bowl • Pasadena, CA

- Date: October 7, 2023
- Game time: 12:01 p.m.
- Game weather: Sunny, 89 °F (32 °C)
- Game attendance: 35,437
- Referee: Mike McCabe
- TV announcers (P12N): Ted Robinson (play-by-play), Yogi Roth (analyst)

Game information

First quarter
Second quarter
Third quarter
Fourth quarter

Statistics	WSU	UCLA
First downs	11	24
Total yards	216	471
Rushes/yards	19–12	53–181
Passing yards	204	290
Passing: Comp–Att–Int	20–40–2	22–44–2
Time of possession	21:45	38:15

Team	Category	Player	Statistics
Washington State	Passing	Cam Ward	22/44, 290 yards, TD, 2 INT
Washington State	Rushing	Nakia Watson	11 carries, 25 yards
Washington State	Receiving	Kyle Williams	8 receptions, 85 yards
UCLA	Passing	Dante Moore	22/44, 290 yards,TD, 2 INT
UCLA	Rushing	Carson Steele	30 carries, 141 yards
UCLA	Receiving	Moliki Matavao	3 receptions, 76 yards

=== at No. 15 Oregon State ===
No. 18 UCLA Bruins (4–1) at No. 15 Oregon State Beavers (5–1) – Game summary

Quarter	1	2	3	4	Total
No. 18 Bruins	0	10	7	7	24
No. 15 Beavers	13	10	13	0	36

at Reser Stadium • Corvallis, OR

- Date: October 14, 2023
- Game time: 5:00 p.m.
- Game weather: Sunny, 62 °F (17 °C)
- Game attendance: 37,600
- Referee: Cravonne Barrett
- TV announcers (FOX): Tim Brando, Spencer Tillman

Game information

First quarter
Second quarter
Third quarter
Fourth quarter

Statistics	UCLA	OSU
First downs	27	18
Total yards	453	415
Rushes/yards	51–287	28–133
Passing yards	166	282
Passing: Comp–Att–Int	15–34–3	16–26–0
Time of possession	30:15	29:45

Team	Category	Player	Statistics
UCLA	Passing	Dante Moore	14/33, 165 yards, TD, 3 INT
UCLA	Rushing	Carson Steele	22 carries, 110 yards, TD
UCLA	Receiving	Logan Loya	5 receptions, 48 yards, TD
Oregon State	Passing	DJ Uiagalelei	14/24, 266 yards, 2 TD
Oregon State	Rushing	Damien Martinez	15 carries, 90 yards
Oregon State	Receiving	Silas Bolden	5 receptions, 87 yards, TD

=== at Stanford ===
No. 25 UCLA Bruins (4–2) at Stanford Cardinal (2–4) – Game summary

Quarter	1	2	3	4	Total
No. 25 Bruins	14	7	14	7	42
Cardinal	0	0	7	0	7

at Stanford Stadium • Stanford, CA

- Date: October 21, 2023
- Game time: 7:30 p.m.
- Game weather: Sunny, 0 °F (−18 °C)
- Game attendance: 30,225
- Referee: Chris Wiggins
- TV announcers (ESPN): Dave Flemming (play-by-play), Brock Osweiler (analyst), Kayla Burton (sideline)

Game information

First quarter

- (10:27) UCLA - Carson Steele 2-yard run, RJ Lopez kick (Drive: 11 plays, 75 yards, 4:33; UCLA 7-0)
- (7:15) UCLA - Carson Steele 8-yard run, RJ Lopez kick (Drive: 3 plays, 60 yards, 0:55; UCLA 14-0)

Second quarter

- (5:27) UCLA - Carson Steele 3-yard run, RJ Lopez kick (Drive: 15 plays, 97 yards, 6:43; UCLA 21-0)

Third quarter

- (6:47) UCLA - J. Michael Sturdivant 8-yard pass from Ethan Garbers, RJ Lopez kick (Drive: 8 plays, 40 yards, 3:11; UCLA 28-0)
- (4:56) UCLA - Moliki Matavao 20-yard pass from Ethan Garbers, RJ Lopez kick (Drive: 2 plays, 29 yards, 0:57; UCLA 35-0)
- (3:11) STAN - Tiger Bachmeier 20-yard pass from Ashton Daniels, Joshua Karty kick (Drive: 6 plays, 75 yards, 1:45; UCLA 35-7)

Fourth quarter

- (14:28) UCLA - TJ Harden 22-yard run, RJ Lopez kick (Drive: 5 plays, 60 yards, 0:39; UCLA 42-7)

Statistics	UCLA	STAN
First downs	32	15
Total yards	503	292
Rushes/yards	54–221	17–24
Passing yards	282	268
Passing: Comp–Att–Int	25–34–0	27–45–1
Time of possession	36:56	23:04

Team	Category	Player	Statistics
UCLA	Passing	Ethan Garbers	20/28, 240 yards, 2 TD
UCLA	Rushing	Carson Steele	20 carries, 76 yards, 3 TD
UCLA	Receiving	J. Michael Sturdivant	5 receptions, 54 yards, TD
Stanford	Passing	Ashton Daniels	27/45, 268 yards, TD, INT
Stanford	Rushing	Sedrick Irvin	3 carries, 16 yards
Stanford	Receiving	Elic Ayomanor	8 receptions, 90 yards

=== vs Colorado ===
Colorado Buffaloes (4–3) vs No. 23 UCLA Bruins (5–2) – Game summary

Quarter	1	2	3	4	Total
Buffaloes	6	0	3	7	16
No. 23 Bruins	0	7	7	14	28

at Rose Bowl • Pasadena, CA

- Date: October 28, 2023
- Game time: 4:30 p.m.
- Game weather: Sunny, 70 °F (21 °C)
- Game attendance: 71,343
- Referee: Matthew Richards
- TV announcers (ABC): Chris Fowler (play by play), Kirk Herbstreit (analyst), Holly Rowe (sideline)

Game information

First quarter

- (10:40) COL – Alejandro Mata 31-yard field goal (Drive: 13 plays, 62 yards, 4:20; Colorado 3–0)
- (7:44) COL – Alejandro Mata 39-yard field goal (Drive: 7 plays, 15 yards, 1:44; Colorado 6–0)

Second quarter

- (14:19) UCLA – Carson Steele 3-yard pass from Ethan Garbers, R. J. Lopez kick (Drive: 9 plays, 45 yards, 4:36; UCLA 7–6)

Third quarter

- (14:25) UCLA – Moliki Matavao 26-yard pass from Ethan Garbers, R. J. Lopez kick (Drive: 2 plays, 75 yards, 0:35; UCLA 14–6)
- (4:13) COL – Alejandro Mata 34-yard field goal (Drive: 9 plays, 64 yards, 3:44; UCLA 14–9)

Fourth quarter

- (14:25) UCLA – T. J. Harden 3-yard run,, R. J. Lopez kick (Drive: 13 plays, 80 yards, 4:50; UCLA 21–9)
- (6:34) UCLA – Collin Schlee 7-yard run,, R. J. Lopez kick (Drive: 11 plays, 75 yards, 6:04; UCLA 28–9)
- (2:37) UCLA – Jimmy Horn Jr. 18-yard pass from Shedeur Sanders, Alejandro Mata kick (Drive: 9 plays, 86 yards, 3:53; UCLA 28–16)

Statistics	COL	UCLA
First downs	20	26
Total yards	242	487
Rushes/yards	24–25	45–218
Passing yards	217	269
Passing: Comp–Att–Int	27–43–0	20–28–2
Time of possession	26:46	33:14

Team	Category	Player	Statistics
Colorado	Passing	Shedeur Sanders	27/43, 217 yards, TD
Colorado	Rushing	Alton McCaskill	2 carries, 14 yards
Colorado	Receiving	Xavier Weaver	5 receptions, 86 yards
UCLA	Passing	Ethan Garbers	20/27, 269 yards, 2 TD
UCLA	Rushing	T. J. Harden	20 carries, 78 yards, TD
UCLA	Receiving	Logan Loya	7 receptions, 111 yards

=== at Arizona ===
No. 20 UCLA Bruins (6–2) at Arizona Wildcats (5–3) – Game summary

Quarter	1	2	3	4	Total
No. 20 Bruins	0	7	3	0	10
Wildcats	7	7	3	10	27

at Arizona Stadium • Tucson, AZ

- Date: November 4, 2023
- Game time: 7:30 p.m.
- Game weather: Clear, 75 °F (24 °C)
- Game attendance: 44,956
- Referee: John Love
- TV announcers (FS1): Jeff Levering, Mark Helfrich

Game information

First quarter

- (2:27) ARIZ – Montana Lemonious-Craig 9-yard pass from Noah Fifita, Tyler Loop kick (Drive: 11 plays, 76 yards, 5:10; Arizona 7–0)

Second quarter

- (1:27) ARIZ – Jacob Cowing 9-yard pass from Noah Fifita, Tyler Loop kick (Drive: 7 plays, 61 yards, 3:07; Arizona 14–0)
- (0:03) UCLA – Carsen Ryan 14-yard pass from Ethan Garbers, Blake Glessner kick (Drive: 8 plays, 75 yards, 1:24; Arizona 14–7)

Third quarter

- (8:15) ARIZ – Tyler Loop 37-yard field goal (Drive: 14 plays, 55 yards, 6:45; Arizona 17–7)
- (2:28) UCLA – Blake Glessner 29-yard field goal (Drive: 14 plays, 64 yards, 5:47; Arizona 17–10)

Fourth quarter

- (14:37) ARIZ – Tetairoa McMillan 11-yard pass from Noah Fifita, Tyler Loop kick (Drive: 6 plays, 75 yards, 2:51; Arizona 24–10)
- (4:40) ARIZ – Tyler Loop 22-yard field goal (Drive: 5 plays, 72 yards, 3:12; Arizona 27–10)

Statistics	UCLA	ARIZ
First downs	17	23
Total yards	271	429
Rushing yards	29–114	35–129
Passing yards	157	300
Passing: Comp–Att–Int	17–33–0	25–33–1
Time of possession	24:46	35:14

Team	Category	Player	Statistics
UCLA	Passing	Ethan Garbers	13/21, 143 yards, TD
UCLA	Rushing	Collin Schlee	6 carries, 46 yards
UCLA	Receiving	Logan Loya	3 receptions, 42 yards
Arizona	Passing	Noah Fifita	25/32, 300 yards, 3 TD, INT
Arizona	Rushing	Jonah Coleman	17 carries, 77 yards
Arizona	Receiving	Tetairoa McMillan	4 receptions, 81 yards, TD

=== vs Arizona State ===
Arizona State Sun Devils (2–7) vs UCLA Bruins (6–3) – Game summary

Quarter	1	2	3	4	Total
Sun Devils	0	3	7	7	17
Bruins	0	0	0	7	7

at Rose Bowl • Pasadena, CA

- Date: November 11, 2023
- Game time: 6:00 p.m.
- Game weather: Clear, 68 °F (20 °C)
- Game attendance: 56,436
- Referee: Jeff Dahle
- TV announcers (P12N): J.B. Long, Lincoln Kennedy

Game information

First quarter

No scoring plays

Second quarter

- (7:54) ASU – Dario Langhetto 29-yard field goal (Drive: 10 plays, 64 yards, 4:47; Arizona State 3–0)

Third quarter

- (1:59) ASU – Elijah Badger 25-yard pass from Cam Skattebo, Dario Longhetto kick (Drive: 14 plays, 99 yards, 7:11; Arizona State 10–0)

Fourth quarter

- (9:47) UCLA – Logan Loya 16-yard pass from Collin Schlee, Blake Glessner kick (Drive: 6 plays, 59 yards, 1:58; Arizona State 10–7)
- (3:07) ASU – Cam Skattebo 17-yard run, Dario Longhetto kick (Drive: 12 plays, 75 yards, 6:40; Arizona State 17–7)

Statistics	ASU	UCLA
First downs	21	15
Total yards	250	300
Rushes/yards	30–74	37–183
Passing yards	176	117
Passing: Comp–Att–Int	22–39–1	11–21–0
Time of possession	36:54	23:06

Team	Category	Player	Statistics
Arizona State	Passing	Trenton Bourguet	19/34, 149 yards, INT
Arizona State	Rushing	Cam Skattebo	12 carries, 61 yards, TD
Arizona State	Receiving	Elijhah Badger	12 receptions, 116 yards, TD
UCLA	Passing	Collin Schlee	11/18, 117 yards, TD
UCLA	Rushing	Keegan Jones	3 carries, 51 yards
UCLA	Receiving	Logan Loya	3 receptions, 39 yards, TD

=== at USC (Victory Bell) ===
UCLA Bruins (6–4) at USC Trojans (7–4) – Game summary

Quarter	1	2	3	4	Total
Bruins	14	0	17	7	38
Trojans	0	10	3	7	20

at Los Angeles Memorial Coliseum • Los Angeles, CA

- Date: November 18, 2023
- Game time: 12:30 p.m.
- Game weather: Cloudy, 68 °F (20 °C)
- Game attendance: 72,243
- Referee: Mike McCabe
- TV announcers (ABC): Dave Pasch (play-by-play), Dusty Dvoracek (analyst), Tom Luginbill (sideline)

Game information

First quarter

- (9:15) UCLA – T.J. Harden 1-yard run, Blake Glessner kick (Drive: 7 plays, 48 yards, 3:11; UCLA 7–0)
- (2:46) UCLA – Hudson Habermahl 14-yard pass from Ethan Garbers, Blake Glessner kick (Drive: 3 plays, 19 yards, 0:54; UCLA 14–0)

Second quarter

- (14:01) USC – Brenden Rice 74-yard pass from Caleb Williams, Denis Lynch kick (Drive: 7 plays, 99 yards, 2:03; UCLA 14–7)
- (0:02) USC – Denis Lynch 14-yard field goal (Drive: 9 plays, 51 yards, 0:49; UCLA 14–10)

Third quarter

- (9:45) UCLA – T.J. Harden 7-yard pass from Ethan Garbers, Blake Glessner kick (Drive: 15 plays, 65 yards, 5:15; UCLA 21–10)
- (9:29 UCLA – Alex Johnson 11-yard fumble recovery return, Blake Glessner kick (UCLA 28–10)
- (3:51) USC – Denis Lynch 34-yard field goal (Drive: 9 plays, 30 yards, 5:32; UCLA 28–13)
- (1:21) UCLA – Blake Glessner 35-yard field goal (Drive: 10 plays, 38 yards, 2:24; UCLA 31–13)

Fourth quarter

- (9:06) UCLA – Hudson Habermahl 15-yard pass from Ethan Garbers, Blake Glessner kick (Drive: 10 plays, 38 yards, 5:01; UCLA 38–13)
- (3:52) USC – Austion Jones 17-yard run, Denis Lynch kick (Drive: 11 plays, 75 yards, 5:14; UCLA 38–20)

Statistics	UCLA	USC
First downs	19	17
Total yards	354	387
Rushes/yards	45–199	22–3
Passing yards	155	384
Passing: Comp–Att–Int	18–31–0	31–44–1
Time of possession	32:34	27:26

Team	Category	Player	Statistics
UCLA	Passing	Ethan Garbers	18/31, 155 yards, 3 TD
UCLA	Rushing	T.J. Harden	22 carries, 142 yards, TD
UCLA	Receiving	Logan Loya	9 receptions, 60 yards
USC	Passing	Caleb Williams	31/42, 384 yards, TD, INT
USC	Rushing	MarShawn Lloyd	8 carries, 17 yards
USC	Receiving	Brenden Rice	8 receptions, 147 yards, TD

UCLA quarterback Ethan Garbers, who sat out the previous week with a foot injury, returned and passed for 155 yards and three touchdowns in a 38–20 win over the USC Trojans. Running back T. J. Harden ran for a career-high 142 yards on 22 carries, rushing for one touchdown and catching another. UCLA's defense held the Trojans to only three yards rushing and sacked USC quarterback Caleb Williams four times.

=== vs California ===
California Golden Bears (5–6) vs UCLA Bruins (7–4) – Game summary

Quarter	1	2	3	4	Total
Golden Bears	6	14	0	0	20
Bruins	0	7	0	0	7

at Rose Bowl • Pasadena, CA

- Date: November 25, 2023
- Game time: 7:30 p.m.
- Game weather: Clear, 55 °F (13 °C)
- Game attendance: 42,439
- Referee: John Love
- TV announcers (ESPN): Dave Flemming, Brock Osweiler, Kayla Burton

Game information

First quarter
Second quarter
Third quarter
Fourth quarter

Statistics	CAL	UCLA
First downs	17	23
Total yards	302	379
Rushes/yards	32–124	36–70
Passing yards	178	309
Passing: Comp–Att–Int	19–30–2	30–47–2
Time of possession	30:01	29:59

Team	Category	Player	Statistics
California	Passing	Fernando Mendoza	19/30, 178 yards, 2 TD, 2 INT
California	Rushing	Jaydn Ott	21 carries, 80 yards
California	Receiving	Jeremiah Hunter	8 receptions, 101 yards, 2 TD
UCLA	Passing	Dante Moore	23/38, 266 yards, TD, 2 INT
UCLA	Rushing	Carson Steele	12 carries, 53 yards
UCLA	Receiving	Logan Loya	9 receptions, 88 yards, TD

=== vs Boise State (LA Bowl) ===
2023 Starco Brands LA Bowl Hosted by Gronk

Quarter	1	2	3	4	Total
UCLA	7	0	21	7	35
Boise State	6	10	0	6	22

at SoFi Stadium • Inglewood, California

- Date: Saturday, December 16, 2023
- Game time: 4:30 p.m. PST
- Game weather: Sunny • Temperature: 68 °F (20 °C)
- Game attendance: 32,780
- Referee: Gary Patterson
- TV announcers (ABC): Dave Flemming (play-by-play), Brock Osweiler, and Kayla Burton (sideline)
- Box score

Game information

First Quarter

- (8:58) BSU – Jonah Dalmas 33 yard field goal (Drive: 10 plays, 59 yards, 4:10; Boise State 3–0)
- (3:36) BSU – Jonah Dalmas 23 yard field goal (Drive: 8 plays, 62 yards, 4:06; Boise State 6–0)
- (0:48) UCLA – Hudson Habermehl 5 yard pass from Collin Schlee, Blake Glessner kick (Drive: 6 plays, 83 yards, 2:48; UCLA 7–6)

Second Quarter

- (11:01) BSU – Jonah Dalmas 33 yard field goal (Drive: 10 plays, 59 yards, 4:47; Boise State 9–7)
- (4:33) BSU – George Holani 1 yard run, Jonah Dalmas kick (Drive: 8 plays, 52 yards, 4:54; Boise State 16–7)

Third Quarter

- (10:03) UCLA – Kyle Ford 5 yard pass from Ethan Garbers, Blake Glessner kick (Drive: 7 plays, 87 yards, 3:28; Boise State 16–14)
- (3:03) UCLA – TJ Harden 1 yard run, Blake Glessner kick (Drive: 9 plays, 72 yards, 3:43; UCLA 21–16)
- (0:19) UCLA – TJ Harden 14 yard run, Blake Glessner kick (Drive: 3 plays, 70 yards, 0:57; UCLA 28–16)

Fourth Quarter

- (6:11) UCLA – J. Michael Sturdivant 40 yard pass from Ethan Garbers, Blake Glessner kick (Drive: 1 play, 40 yards, 0:07; UCLA 35–16)
- (5:08) BSU – George Holani 66 yard run, two-point pass conversion failed (Drive: 3 plays, 75 yards, 1:03; UCLA 35–22)

Statistics	BSU	UCLA
First downs	15	18
Plays–yards	58–332	64–510
Rushes–yards	37–215	36–280
Passing yards	117	230
Passing: comp–att–int	12–21–1	20–28–0
Time of possession	31:33	28:27

Team	Category	Player	Statistics
Boise State	Passing	CJ Tiller	12/21, 117 yards, INT
Boise State	Rushing	George Holani	17 carries, 138 yards, 2 TD
Boise State	Receiving	George Holani	1 reception, 45 yards
UCLA	Passing	Ethan Garbers	9/12, 152 yards, 2 TD
UCLA	Rushing	Collin Schlee	7 carries, 127 yards
UCLA	Receiving	J. Michael Sturdivant	4 receptions, 142 yards, TD

UCLA won 35–22 over Mountain West Conference champion Boise State. It was the Bruins' first bowl win in Kelly's six-year tenure and the program's first since 2015. It was UCLA's third consecutive eight-win season, the second such streak in the program since 1988 under coach Terry Donahue.

== Rankings ==
Ranking movements Legend: ██ Increase in ranking ██ Decrease in ranking — = Not ranked RV = Received votes
	Week															
Poll	Pre	1	2	3	4	5	6	7	8	9	10	11	12	13	14	Final
AP	RV	RV	24	22	RV	—	18	25	23	20	RV	—	RV	—		
Coaches	RV	RV	25	25	RV	RV	22	25	24	20	RV	—	RV	—		
CFP	Not released									19	—	—	—	—		Not released

== Statistics ==
Statistics	OPP	UCLA
First downs	0	0
Plays–yards	0-0	0-0
Rushes–yards	0-0	0-0
Passing yards	0,000	0,000
Passing: comp–att–int	0-0-0	0-0-0
Time of possession	0:00 / game	0:00 / game

== Awards and honors ==
Recipient	Award (Pac-12 Conference)	Week #	Date awarded	Ref.
Dante Moore	Freshman Player of the Week	2	Sept. 11, 2023	
Laiatu Latu	Defense Player of the Week	6	Oct. 9, 2023	
Laiatu Latu	Defensive Lineman Player of the Week	6	Oct. 9, 2023	
Laiatu Latu	Defensive Lineman of the Week	12	Nov. 20, 2023	
Laiatu Latu	Pat Tillman Defensive Player of the Year		Dec. 5, 2023	

- November 20, 2023 – Defensive Coordinator D’Anton Lynn was named to the Broyles Award semi-finalist list
- November 24, 2023 – Laiatu Latu is a finalist for the Lott IMPACT Trophy
- November 28, 2023 – Laiatu Latu is a finalist for the Bednarik Award
- December 1, 2023 – Laiatu Latu is a finalist for the Hendricks Award
- December 6, 2023 – Laiatu Latu is the winner of the Lombardi Award (college football’s lineman of the year)
- December 7, 2023 – Laiatu Latu wins the Ted Hendricks Award
- December 11, 2023 – Laiatu Latu is the winner of the Pac-12's Morris Trophy
- December 16, 2023 – Ethan Garbers (QB) and Darius Muasau (LB) were MVP of the 2023 LA Bowl
