= 2024 UCLA Bruins football team =

American college football season

2024 UCLA Bruins football
- Conference: Big Ten Conference
- Record: 5–7 (3–6 Big Ten)
- Head coach: DeShaun Foster (1st season)
- Offensive coordinator: Eric Bieniemy (1st season)
- Offensive scheme: West Coast
- Defensive coordinator: Ikaika Malloe (1st season)
- Base defense: 4–3
- Home stadium: Rose Bowl

Uniform

2024 Big Ten Conference football standings
	Conf.			Overall
Team	W		L	W		L
No. 3 Oregon y$^	9	–	0	13	–	1
No. 10 Indiana ^	8	–	1	11	–	2
No. 5 Penn State y^	8	–	1	13	–	3
No. 1 Ohio State #^	7	–	2	14	–	2
No. 16 Illinois	6	–	3	10	–	3
Iowa	6	–	3	8	–	5
Michigan	5	–	4	8	–	5
Minnesota	5	–	4	8	–	5
USC	4	–	5	7	–	6
Rutgers	4	–	5	7	–	6
Washington	4	–	5	6	–	7
Nebraska	3	–	6	7	–	6
UCLA	3	–	6	5	–	7
Wisconsin	3	–	6	5	–	7
Northwestern	2	–	7	4	–	8
Maryland	1	–	8	4	–	8
Michigan State†	0	–	6	0	–	7
Purdue	0	–	9	1	–	11
Championship: Oregon 45, Penn State 37
# – College Football Playoff champion; ^ – College Football Playoff participant; $ – Conference champion; y – Championship game participant; † — NCAA vacated all wins for Michigan State (5–7, 3–6); Rankings from AP Poll

The 2024 UCLA Bruins football team represented the University of California, Los Angeles in the Big Ten Conference during the 2024 NCAA Division I FBS football season. The Bruins played their home games at the Rose Bowl in Pasadena, California. Former running back coach DeShaun Foster was in his first year as head coach, replacing Chip Kelly.

The 2024 season is the Bruins' first in the Big Ten since departing from the Pac-12 Conference.

The season was highlighted by a strong strength of schedule and poor offensive production. UCLA struggled to score in the redzone throughout the season and only scored more than thirty points in a game once, against Rutgers. They snapped a four game losing streak to Fresno State on the final week of the regular season after a third straight home loss to USC, finishing 5–7 overall and 3–6 in the Big Ten Conference.

== Offseason ==
=== Incoming transfers ===
- EDGE Collins Acheampong – Miami (FL)
- CB Bryan Addison – Oregon
- IOL Oluwafunto Akinshilo – Iowa State
- RB Jalen Berger – Michigan State
- K Mateen Bhaghani – California
- QB Nick Billoups – BYU
- EDGE Jacob Busic – Navy
- OT Michael Carmody – Notre Dame
- QB Demaricus Davis – Washington
- LS Travis Drosos – South Alabama
- WR Rico Flores Jr. – Notre Dame
- WR Kyle Ford – USC
- RB Anthony Frias – Kansas State
- S Ramon Henderson – Notre Dame
- RB Leo Kemp – San Diego State
- IOL Alani Makihele – UNLV
- CB Kaylin Moore – California
- TE Bryce Pierre – Arizona State
- S Marcus Ratcliffe – San Diego State
- P Brody Richter – Northern Arizona
- DL Luke Schuermann – Johns Hopkins
- EDGE Cherif Seye – Florida A&M
- DL Drew Tuazama – South Carolina
- OT Reuben Unije – Louisville
- LB Joseph Vaughn – Yale
- CB K.J. Wallace – Georgia Tech

=== Outgoing transfers ===
- WR Kam Brown – Purdue
- EDGE Choe Bryant-Strother – BYU
- OT Bruno Fina – Duke
- WR Kyle Ford – USC
- RB Anthony Frias – Withdrawn
- LS Beau Gardner – Georgia
- DB Jaxon Harley – Cerritos College
- IOL Spencer Holstege – Withdrawn
- CB John Humphrey – USC
- WR Keegan Jones – Withdrawn
- WR Ari Libenson – TBD
- K RJ Lopez – Purdue
- WR Jeremiah McClure – San Diego State
- QB Dante Moore – Oregon
- S William Nimmo Jr. – San Diego State
- TE Grant Norberg – San Jose State
- S Kamari Ramsey – USC
- IOL Benjamin Roy – UMass
- TE Carsen Ryan – Utah
- QB Collin Schlee – Virginia Tech
- WR Bradley Schlom – San Diego
- DL Jay Toia – Withdrawn
- DB Kaleb Tuliau – Austin Peay
- IOL Jake Wiley – Houston

== Schedule ==
Date	Time	Opponent	Site	TV	Result	Attendance
August 31	4:30 p.m.	at Hawaii*	Clarence T. C. Ching Athletics Complex; Honolulu, HI	CBS	W 16–13	15,194
September 14	4:30 p.m.	Indiana	Rose Bowl; Pasadena, CA	NBC	L 13–42	47,811
September 21	12:30 p.m.	at No. 16 LSU*	Tiger Stadium; Baton Rouge, LA (SEC Nation)	ABC	L 17–34	100,315
September 28	8:00 p.m.	No. 8 Oregon	Rose Bowl; Pasadena, CA	FOX	L 13–34	43,051
October 5	9:00 a.m.	at No. 7 Penn State	Beaver Stadium; University Park, PA (Big Noon Kickoff)	FOX	L 11–27	110,047
October 12	6:00 p.m.	Minnesota	Rose Bowl; Pasadena, CA	BTN	L 17–21	42,012
October 19	9:00 a.m.	at Rutgers	SHI Stadium; Piscataway, NJ	FS1	W 35–32	53,726
November 2	12:30 p.m.	at Nebraska	Memorial Stadium; Lincoln, NE	BTN	W 27–20	87,453
November 8	6:00 p.m.	Iowa^{†}	Rose Bowl; Pasadena, CA	FOX	W 20–17	53,467
November 15	6:00 p.m.	at Washington	Husky Stadium; Seattle, WA	FOX	L 19–31	68,811
November 23	7:30 p.m.	USC	Rose Bowl; Pasadena, CA (Victory Bell)	NBC	L 13–19	59,473
November 30	12:30 p.m.	Fresno State*	Rose Bowl; Pasadena, CA (Senior Day, Veteran & Armed Forces Appreciation)	BTN	W 20–13	35,018
*Non-conference game; ^{†}Homecoming; Rankings from AP Poll - Released prior to game; All times are in Pacific time

== Roster ==
2024 UCLA Bruins football team roster
Players
Coaches
Offense

Pos.	#	Name	Class
RB	0	Jalen Berger	Sr
WR	1	Rico Flores Jr.	So
WR	2	Titus Mokiao-Atimalala	Jr
WR	3	Kwazi Gilmer	Fr
QB	4	Ethan Garbers	Sr
QB	6	Justyn Martin	So
WR	7	J. Michael Sturdivant	Jr
QB	9	Dermaricus Davis	Fr
QB	10	Henry Hasselbeck	Fr
QB	11	Chase Griffin	Sr
QB	12	Luke Duncan	Fr
WR	14	Carter Shaw	Fr
WR	15	Braden Pegan	So
WR	17	Logan Loya	Sr
QB	18	Nick Billoups	Sr
QB	19	Karson Gordon	Fr
RB	20	Cameron Jones	Fr
WR	21	Ezavier Staples	Jr
RB	22	Keegan Jones	Sr
RB	23	Anthony Adkins	Sr
RB	25	T. J. Harden	Jr
RB	27	Isaiah Carlson	Fr
TE	28	Jack Pedersen	So
RB	29	Anthony Frias II	Jr
RB	31	Deshun Murrell	Jr
RB	32	Troy Leigber	Fr
WR	35	Devanti Dillard	Sr
RB	44	Peter Bario	Fr
RB	49	Leo Kemp	So
OL	50	Dovid Magna	Sr
OL	52	Michael Carmody	Jr
OL	54	Josh Carlin	Sr
OL	56	Tavake Tuikolovatu	Fr
OL	60	Jensen Somerville	Fr
OL	61	Jack Clarke	Fr
OL	62	Michael Sultemeier	Fr
OL	63	Kory Symington	Fr
OL	64	Sam Yoon	So
OL	65	Devin Delgado	Jr
OL	66	Niki Prongos	So
OL	67	Yutaka Mahe	Jr
OL	68	Noah Pulealii	Jr
OL	69	Oluwafunto Akinshilo	Jr
OL	70	Caleb Walker	Jr
OL	71	Reuben Unije	Sr
OL	72	Garrett DiGiorgio	Jr
OL	73	Alani Makihele	Jr
OL	74	Spencer Holstege	Sr
OL	75	Mark Schroller	Fr
OL	76	Marquise Thorpe-Taylor	Fr
OL	77	Jaylan Jeffers	Sr
OL	78	Walker Andersen	Fr
TE	81	Hudson Habermehl	Sr
TE	82	Sam Summa	Jr
WR	83	Russell Weir	Fr
WR	85	Grant Gray	Fr
TE	87	Bryce Pierre	Sr
TE	88	Moliki Matavao	Jr
TE	89	Michael Churich	Sr

Defense

Pos.	#	Name	Class
LB	0	Donavyn Pellot	Fr
DB	1	Kanye Clark	Fr
LB	2	Oluwafemi Oladejo	Sr
DB	3	Devin Kirkwood	Sr
DB	4	Bryan Addison	Sr
DB	6	Jaylin Davies	Jr
DB	7	K. J. Wallace	Sr
DB	9	Kaylin Moore	Sr
LB	10	Ale Kaho	Sr
DB	11	Ramon Henderson	Sr
DB	12	Jamir Benjamin	Fr
DB	14	Clint Stephens	So
DL	15	Drew Tuazama	Sr
LB	17	Jalen Woods	So
DB	18	Jadyn Marshall	So
DB	19	D. J. Justice	Jr
LB	20	Kain Medrano	Sr
LB	21	JonJon Vaughns	Sr
DB	22	Croix Stewart	So
DB	23	Khristian Dunbar-Hawkins	Fr
DB	26	Zeke Thomas	Sr
DB	29	Evan Thomas	Sr
LB	30	Joseph Vaughn	Sr
LB	33	Ty Lee	Fr
DB	36	Joshua Swift	Sr
DB	37	Joshua Dixon	Fr
DB	39	R. J. Jones	Fr
LB	40	Mone Malafu	Fr
LB	41	Larry Edwards III	Fr
DB	43	Brett Barry	Fr
DL	44	Devin Aupiu	Jr
DB	45	Marquise Villahermosa	Fr
LB	47	Wyatt Mosier	Fr
DL	48	Joquarri Price	Sr
LB	49	Carson Schwesinger	Jr
LB	51	Isaiah Patterson	Fr
DL	52	Jordan Abarca	Fr
LB	53	Jacob Reis	Fr
DL	55	A. J. Fuimaono	Fr
DL	58	Gary Smith III	Sr
DL	59	Tannen Vagle	Sr
DL	88	Grant Buckey	Fr
DL	91	Michael Sullivan	Jr
DL	92	Siale Taupaki	Sr
DL	93	Jay Toia	Sr
DL	94	Cherif Seye	Sr
DL	95	Sitiveni Havili-Kaufusi	Sr
DL	96	Collins Acheampong	Fr
DL	97	Jacob Busic	Jr
DL	98	Luke Schuermann	Sr
DL	99	Keanu Williams	Jr

Special teams

Pos.	#	Name	Class
K	37	David Dellenbach	Fr
K	39	Blake Glessner	Sr
P	45	Chase Barry	So
LS	46	Travis Drosos	Sr
LS	50	Salem Abdul-Wahab	So
LS	90	Marcus MacNeal	Fr
P	91	Brody Richter	So
K	94	Mateen Bhaghani	So
K	97	Joseph Firebaugh Jr.	Jr
LS	98	Trent Middleton	Fr
K	99	Abduli Ali	Fr

Head coach

- DeShaun Foster

Coordinators/assistant coaches

- Eric Bieniemy – Associate head coach/Offensive coordinator
- Ikaika Malloe – Defensive coordinator/Inside linebackers
- Brian Norwood – Assistant head coach/Passing game coordinator/Safeties
- Juan Castillo – Offensive line
- Erik Frazier – Wide receivers
- Jerry Neuheisel – Tight ends
- Marcus Thomas – Running backs
- Tony Washington Jr. – Defensive line/outside linebackers
- Ted White – Quarterbacks
- Kodi Whitfield – Special teams coordinator/cornerbacks

Legend

- (C) Team captain
- (S) Suspended
- (I) Ineligible
- Injured
- Redshirt

Roster
Last update: 11/16/24

== Game summaries ==
=== at Hawaii ===
Game One – UCLA Bruins (0–0) at Hawaii Rainbow Warriors (0–0) – Game summary

Quarter	1	2	3	4	Total
Bruins	0	0	10	6	16
Rainbow Warriors	7	3	3	0	13

at Clarence T. C. Ching Athletics Complex • Honolulu, Hawaii

- Date: August 31
- Game time: 4:30 p.m.
- Game weather: Sunny, 87 °F (31 °C)
- Game attendance: 15,194
- Referee: Jerry McGinn
- TV announcers (CBS): Tom McCarthy (play-by-play), Ross Tucker (color analyst), and Tiffany Blackmon (sideline reporter)

Game information

First quarter

- HAW – Pofele Ashlock 19-yard pass from Brayden Schager (Kansei Matsuzawa kick), 7:43. Rainbow Warriors 7–0. Drive: 9 plays, 73 yards, 5:34.

Second quarter

- HAW – Kansei Matsuzawa 28-yard field goal, 0:00. Rainbow Warriors 10–0. Drive: 4 plays, -5 yards, 0:20.

Third quarter

- UCLA – Rico Flores Jr. 39-yard pass from Ethan Garbers (Blake Gessner kick), 8:41. Rainbow Warriors 10–7. Drive: 8 plays, 96 yards, 4:36.
- HAW – Kansei Matsuzawa 28-yard field goal, 4:12. Rainbow Warriors 13–7. Drive: 10 plays, 64 yards, 4:29.
- UCLA – Mateen Bhaghani 22-yard field goal, 0:54. Rainbow Warriors 13–10. Drive: 8 plays, 71 yards, 3:18.

Fourth quarter

- UCLA – Mateen Bhaghani 37-yard field goal, 14:05. Tied 13–13. Drive: 5 plays, 16 yards, 1:33.
- UCLA – Mateen Bhaghani 32-yard field goal, 0:56. Bruins 16–13. Drive: 7 plays, 45 yards, 2:12.

Statistics	UCLA	HAW
First downs	19	18
Total yards	343	278
Rushing yards	71	51
Passing yards	272	227
Passing:	19–38–2	25–42–2
Time of possession	27:34	32:26

Team	Category	Player	Statistics
UCLA	Passing	Ethan Garbers	19/38, 272 yards, 1 TD, 2 INT
UCLA	Rushing	Ethan Garbers	7 carries, 47 yards
UCLA	Receiving	Rico Flores Jr.	3 receptions, 102 yards, 1 TD
Hawaii	Passing	Brayden Schager	25/42, 227 yards, 1 TD, 2 INT
Hawaii	Rushing	Lucas Borrow	1 carry, 19 yards
Hawaii	Receiving	Pofele Ashlock	9 receptions, 112 yards, 1 TD

=== vs Indiana ===
Indiana Hoosiers (2–0) vs UCLA Bruins (1–0) – Game summary

Quarter	1	2	3	4	Total
Hoosiers	14	7	7	14	42
Bruins	0	7	3	3	13

at Rose Bowl • Pasadena, California

- Date: September 14
- Game time: 4:30 p.m.
- Game weather: Sunny, 78 °F (26 °C), SW 7 mph
- Game attendance: 47,811
- Referee: Bryan Banks
- TV announcers (NBC): Noah Eagle (play-by-play), Todd Blackledge (color analyst), and Kathryn Tappen (sideline reporter)

Game information

First quarter

- (8:31) IND – Miles Cross 3-yard pass from Kurtis Rourke, Nicolas Radicic kick (Drive: 12 plays, 75 yards, 6:25; Indiana 7–0)
- (7:28) IND – Ke'Shawn Williams 14-yard pass from Kurtis Rourke, Nicolas Radicic kick (Drive: 3 plays, 17 yards, 0:53; Indiana 14–0)

Second quarter

- (4:21) IND – Justice Ellison 1-yard run, Nicolas Radicic kick (Drive: 12 plays, 90 yards, 5:29; Indiana 21–0)
- (0:42) UCLA – T. J. Harden 1-yard run, Mateen Bhaghani kick (Drive: 9 plays, 78 yards, 3:34; Indiana 21–7)

Third quarter

- (9:37) UCLA – Mateen Bhaghani 28-yard field goal (Drive: 9 plays, 65 yards, 5:19; Indiana 21–10)
- (4:55) IND – Ke'Shawn Williams 3-yard pass from Kurtis Rourke, Nicholas Radicic kick (Drive: 9 plays, 87 yards, 4:36; Indiana 28–10)

Fourth quarter

- (13:13) UCLA – Mateen Bhaghani 34-yard field goal (Drive: 11 plays, 66 yards, 6:37; Indiana 28–13)
- (7:28) IND – Omar Cooper Jr. 23-yard pass from Kurtis Rourke, Nicolas Radicic kick (Drive: 10 plays, 75 yards, 5:45; Indiana 35–13)
- (5:28) IND – Elijah Green 14-yard run, Nicolas Radicic kick (Drive: 4 plays, 40 yards, 1:36; Indiana 42–13)

Statistics	IU	UCLA
First downs	25	16
Total yards	62–430	50–238
Rushing yards	29–123	26–96
Passing yards	307	142
Passing:	25–33–0	15–24–1
Time of possession	31:34	28:26

Team	Category	Player	Statistics
Indiana	Passing	Kurtis Rourke	25/33, 307 yards, 4 TD
Indiana	Rushing	Justice Ellison	10 carries, 47 yards, 1 TD
Indiana	Receiving	Miles Cross	6 receptions, 90 yards, 1 TD
UCLA	Passing	Ethan Garbers	14/23, 137 yards, 1 INT
UCLA	Rushing	T. J. Harden	12 carries, 48 yards, 1 TD
UCLA	Receiving	T. J. Harden	4 receptions, 41 yards

=== at No. 16 LSU ===
UCLA Bruins (1–1) at No. 16 LSU Tigers (2–1) – Game summary

Quarter	1	2	3	4	Total
Bruins	10	7	0	0	17
No. 16 Tigers	7	10	7	10	34

at Tiger Stadium • Baton Rouge, Louisiana

- Date: September 21
- Game time: 12:30 p.m.
- Game weather: Sunny • Temperature: 91 °F (33 °C) • Wind: SE at 8 miles per hour (13 km/h)
- Game attendance: 100,315
- Referee: Jerry McGinn
- TV announcers (ABC): Joe Tessitore (play-by-play), Jesse Palmer (color analyst), and Katie George (sideline reporter)

Game information

First quarter

- (12:19) LSU – Zavion Thomas 5-yard pass from Garrett Nussmeier, Damian Ramos kick (Drive: 6 plays, 75 yards, 2:41; LSU 7–0)
- (8:10) UCLA – Jack Pedersen 20-yard pass from Ethan Garbers, Mateen Bhaghani kick (Drive: 8 plays, 75 yards, 4:09; Tied 7–7)
- (0:17) UCLA – Mateen Bhaghani 47-yard field goal (Drive: 7 plays, 27 yards, 3:12; UCLA 10–7)

Second quarter

- (13:57) LSU – Kyle Parker 45-yard pass from Garrett Nussmeier, Damian Ramos kick (Drive: 4 plays, 75 yards, 1:20; LSU 14–10)
- (3:45) LSU – Damian Ramos 22-yard field goal (Drive: 7 plays, 33 yards, 3:01; LSU 17–10)
- (0:02) UCLA – Logan Loya 11-yard pass from Ethan Garbers, Mateen Bhaghani kick (Drive: 11 plays, 75 yards, 3:43; Tied 17–17)

Third quarter

- (6:11) LSU – Josh Williams 2-yard run, Damian Ramos kick (Drive: 14 plays, 96 yards, 6:33; LSU 24–17)

Fourth quarter

- (11:15) LSU – Caden Durham 35-yard pass from Garrett Nussmeier, Damian Ramos kick (Drive: 11 plays, 92 yards, 5:15; LSU 31–17)
- (5:48) LSU – Damian Ramos 32-yard field goal (Drive: 8 plays, 31 yards, 3:37; LSU 34–17)

Statistics	UCLA	LSU
First downs	17	27
Total yards	58–295	72–454
Rushing yards	22–14	28–102
Passing yards	281	352
Passing:	22–36–1	32–44–0
Time of possession	26:24	33:36

Team	Category	Player	Statistics
UCLA	Passing	Ethan Garbers	22/36, 281 yards, 2 TD, INT
UCLA	Rushing	Keegan Jones	3 carries, 22 yards
UCLA	Receiving	Kwazi Gilmer	2 receptions, 61 yards
LSU	Passing	Garrett Nussmeier	32/44, 352 yards, 3 TD
LSU	Rushing	Josh Williams	13 carries, 62 yards, TD
LSU	Receiving	Mason Taylor	8 receptions, 77 yards

=== vs No. 8 Oregon ===
No. 8 Oregon Ducks (3–0) vs UCLA Bruins (1–2) – Game summary

Quarter	1	2	3	4	Total
No. 8 Ducks	7	21	0	6	34
Bruins	3	7	3	0	13

at Rose Bowl • Pasadena, California

- Date: September 28
- Game time: 8:00 p.m.
- Game weather: Clear • Temperature: 68 °F (20 °C) • Wind: W 2 mph
- Game attendance: 43,051
- Referee: Ron Snodgrass
- TV announcers (FOX): Connor Onion (play-by-play), Mark Helfrich (color analyst), and Josh Sims (sideline reporter)

Game information

First quarter

- (9:38) ORE – Traeshon Holden 12-yard pass from Dillon Gabriel, Atticus Sappington kick (Drive: 12 plays, 75 yards, 5:22; Oregon 7–0)
- (2:35) UCLA – Mateen Bhaghani 27-yard field goal (Drive: 12 plays, 66 yards, 7:04; Oregon 7–3)

Second quarter

- (14:55) ORE – Atticus Sappington 41-yard field goal (Drive: 7 plays, 49 yards, 2:31; Oregon 10–3)
- (11:53) ORE – Jordan James 2-yard run, Atticus Sappington kick (Drive: 6 plays, 23 yards, 2:25; Oregon 17–3)
- (9:11) ORE – Tez Johnson 52-yard pass from Dillon Gabriel, Terrance Ferguson pass (Drive: 3 plays, 65 yards, 0:49; Oregon 25–3)
- (2:25) ORE – Atticus Sappington 42-yard field goal (Drive: 11 plays, 46 yards, 4:33; Oregon 28–3)
- (0:04) UCLA – Bryan Addison 96-yard interception, Mateen Bhaghani kick (Oregon 28–10)

Third quarter

- (7:34) UCLA – Mateen Bhaghani 54-yard field goal (Drive: 6 plays, 17 yards, 2:23; Oregon 28–13)

Fourth quarter

- (9:37) ORE – Tez Johnson 12-yard pass from Dillon Gabriel (Drive: 11 plays, 61 yards, 5:23; Oregon 34–13)

Statistics	ORE	UCLA
First downs	27	11
Total yards	78–431	48–172
Rushing yards	36–153	24–47
Passing yards	278	125
Passing:	31–42–1	13–24–2
Time of possession	33:32	26:28

Team	Category	Player	Statistics
Oregon	Passing	Dillon Gabriel	31/41, 278 yards, 3 TD, INT
Oregon	Rushing	Jordan James	20 carries, 103 yards, TD
Oregon	Receiving	Tez Johnson	11 receptions, 121 yards, 2 TD
UCLA	Passing	Ethan Garbers	12/20, 118 yards, 2 INT
UCLA	Rushing	T. J. Harden	13 carries, 53 yards
UCLA	Receiving	Kwazi Gilmer	4 receptions, 31 yards

=== at No. 7 Penn State ===
UCLA leads the series 4–2 with Penn State winning the last meeting 21–6 on October 12, 1968.

UCLA Bruins (1–3) at No. 7 Penn State Nittany Lions (4–0) – Game summary

Quarter	1	2	3	4	Total
Bruins	0	3	0	8	11
No. 7 Nittany Lions	0	14	10	3	27

at Beaver Stadium • University Park, Pennsylvania

- Date: October 5
- Game time: 9:00 a.m.
- Game weather: Sunny, 65 °F (18 °C)
- Game attendance: 110,047
- Referee: Tim O'Dey
- TV announcers (FOX): Gus Johnson (play-by-play), Joel Klatt (color analyst), and Jenny Taft (sideline reporter)

Game information

First quarter

No scoring

Second quarter

- PSU – Drew Allar, 1-yard TD run, Ryan Barker kick, 6:40 (PSU 7–0)
- UCLA – Mateen Bhaghani, 25-yard field goal, 2:51 (PSU 7–3)
- PSU – Tyler Warren, 5-yard TD pass from Allar, Barker kick, 0:20 (PSU 14–3)

Third quarter

- PSU – Barker, 25-yard field goal, 8:36 (PSU 17–3)
- PSU – Kaytron Allen, 1-yard TD run, Barker kick, 2:57 (PSU 24–3)

Fourth quarter

- PSU – Barker, 40-yard field goal, 8:17 (PSU 27–3)
- UCLA – Logan Loya, 1-yard TD pass from Justyn Martin, Keegan Jones pass from Martin for two-point conversion, 0:16 (PSU 27–11)

Statistics	UCLA	PSU
First downs	14	18
Total yards	59–260	54–322
Rushing yards	29–93	30–85
Passing yards	167	237
Passing:	22–30–0	17–24–0
Time of possession	32:57	27:03

Team	Category	Player	Statistics
UCLA	Passing	Justyn Martin	22/30, 167 yards, TD
UCLA	Rushing	Jalen Berger	9 carries, 38 yards
UCLA	Receiving	T.J. Harden	5 receptions, 59 yards
Penn State	Passing	Drew Allar	17/24, 237 yards, TD
Penn State	Rushing	Kaytron Allen	21 carries, 78 yards, TD
Penn State	Receiving	Liam Clifford	3 receptions, 107 yards

=== vs Minnesota ===
Minnesota Golden Gophers (3–3) vs UCLA Bruins (1–4) – Game summary

Quarter	1	2	3	4	Total
Golden Gophers	0	0	14	7	21
Bruins	7	3	0	7	17

at Rose Bowl • Pasadena, California

- Date: October 12
- Game time: 6:00 p.m.
- Game weather: Sunny
- Game attendance: 42,012
- Referee: Jeffrey Servinski
- TV announcers (BTN): Guy Haberman (play-by-play), Yogi Roth (analyst), and Rhett Lewis (sideline)

Game information

First quarter

- (8:49) UCLA - Keegan Jones 1-yard rush (Mateen Bhaghani kick) (Drive: 10 plays, 59 yards, 5:14; UCLA 7–0)

Second quarter

- (0:00) UCLA - Mateen Bhaghani 34-yard field goal (Drive: 6 plays, 47 yards, 0:46; UCLA 10–0)

Third quarter

- (10:33) MINN - Elijah Spencer 12-yard pass from Max Brosmer (Dragan Kesich kick) (Drive: 5 plays, 46 yards, 2:41; UCLA 10–7)
- (7:16) MINN - Darius Taylor 2-yard rush (Dragan Kesich kick) (Drive: 6 plays, 38 yards, 2:29; Minnesota 14–10)

Fourth quarter

- (6:54) UCLA - J. Michael Sturdivant 42-yard pass from Ethan Garbers (Mateen Bhaghani kick) (Drive: 9 plays, 89 yards, 5:44; UCLA 17–14)
- (0:27) MINN - Darius Taylor 4-yard pass from Max Brosmer (Dragan Kesich kick) (Drive: 7 plays, 61 yards, 1:53; Minnesota 21–17)

Statistics	MINN	UCLA
First downs	19	18
Total yards	234	329
Rushing yards	41	36
Passing yards	193	293
Passing: Comp–Att–Int	26-37-0	25-36-3
Time of possession	30:58	29:02

Team	Category	Player	Statistics
Minnesota	Passing	Max Brosmer	26/37, 193 yards, 2 TD
Minnesota	Rushing	Darius Taylor	16 carries, 30 yards, TD
Minnesota	Receiving	Daniel Jackson	10 receptions, 89 yards
UCLA	Passing	Ethan Garbers	25/36, 293 yards, TD, 3 INT
UCLA	Rushing	Jalen Berger	8 carries, 20 yards
UCLA	Receiving	J. Michael Sturdivant	7 receptions, 107 yards, TD

=== at Rutgers ===
UCLA Bruins (1–5) at Rutgers Scarlet Knights (4–2) – Game summary

Quarter	1	2	3	4	Total
Bruins	7	14	7	7	35
Scarlet Knights	7	3	9	6	25

at SHI Stadium • Piscataway, New Jersey

- Date: October 19
- Game time: 9:00 a.m.
- Game weather: Sunny
- Game attendance: 53,726
- Referee: Chris Coyte
- TV announcers (FS1): Guy Haberman (play-by-play), Yogi Roth (analyst), and Rhett Lewis (sideline)

Statistics	UCLA	RUTG
First downs		
Total yards		
Rushing yards		
Passing yards		
Passing:		
Time of possession		

Team	Category	Player	Statistics
UCLA	Passing		
UCLA	Rushing		
UCLA	Receiving		
Rutgers	Passing		
Rutgers	Rushing		
Rutgers	Receiving		

=== at Nebraska ===
UCLA Bruins (3–5) at Nebraska Cornhuskers (5–3) – Game summary

Quarter	1	2	3	4	Total
Bruins	3	10	14	0	27
Cornhuskers	0	7	7	6	20

at Memorial Stadium • Lincoln, Nebraska

- Date: November 2
- Game time: 12:30 p.m.
- Game weather: Overcast, 56 degrees, Wind SE @ 11 mph
- Game attendance: 87,453
- Referee: Jerry McGinn
- TV announcers (BTN): Guy Haberman (play-by-play), Yogi Roth (analyst), and Rhett Lewis (sideline)

Game information

First Quarter

- (7:00) UCLA – Mateen Bhaghani 25-yard field goal (Drive: 14 plays, 68 yards, 8:00, UCLA 3-0)

Second Quarter

- (13:47) UCLA – Jalen Berger 10-yard pass from Ethan Garbers, Mateen Bhaghani kick (Drive: 11 plays, 85 yards, 6:37, UCLA 10-0)
- (10:02) NEB - Dante Dowdell 4-yard run, John Hohl kick (Drive: 9 plays, 75 yards, 3:45, UCLA 10-7)
- (6:52) UCLA - Mateen Bhaghani 26-yard field goal (Drive: 7 plays, 67 yards, 3:10, UCLA 13-7)

Third Quarter

- (14:50) UCLA - Kain Medrano 38-yard interception return, Mateen Bhaghani kick (Drive: 0:10, UCLA 20-7)
- (8:21) UCLA - Kwazi Gilmer 48-yard pass from Ethan Garbers, Mateen Bhaghani kick (Drive: 3 plays, 58 yards, 1:42, UCLA 27-7)
- (5:23) NEB - Isaiah Neyor 8-yard pass from Dylan Raiola, John Hohl kick (Drive: 7 plays, 75 yards, 2:58, UCLA 27-14)

Fourth Quarter

- (3:57) NEB – Dante Dowdell 1-yard run, John Hohl kick missed (Drive: 13 plays, 53 yards, 6:01, UCLA 27-20)

Statistics	UCLA	NEB
First downs	17	21
Total yards	55–358	72–322
Rushing yards	30–139	38–113
Passing yards	219	209
Passing:	17–25–0	16–34–2
Time of possession	29:14	30:46

Team	Category	Player	Statistics
UCLA	Passing	Ethan Garbers	17/25, 219 yards, 2 TD
UCLA	Rushing	Ethan Garbers	6 carries, 56 yards
UCLA	Receiving	Kwazi Gilmer	3 receptions, 88 yards, TD
Nebraska	Passing	Dylan Raiola	14/27, 177 yards, TD, INT
Nebraska	Rushing	Dante Dowdell	17 carries, 61 yards, 2 TD
Nebraska	Receiving	Isaiah Neyor	4 receptions, 89 yards, TD

=== vs Iowa (Homecoming) ===
Iowa Hawkeyes (6–3) vs UCLA Bruins (3–5) – Game summary

Quarter	1	2	3	4	Total
Hawkeyes	10	0	0	7	17
Bruins	0	17	0	3	20

at Rose Bowl • Pasadena, California

- Date: November 8
- Game time: 6:00 p.m.
- Game weather: 62 °F (17 °C), Sunny, Wind NW 4 mph (6.4 km/h)
- Game attendance: 53,467
- Referee: Ron Snodgrass
- TV announcers (FOX): Connor Onion (play-by-play) and Mark Helfrich (color analyst)

Game information

First quarter

- (11:44) IOWA – Kaleb Johnson 2-yard run, Drew Stevens kick (Drive: 3 plays, 41 yards, 1:46; Iowa 7–0)
- (0:55) IOWA – Drew Stevens 24-yard field goal (Drive: 7 plays, 74 yards, 3:54; Iowa 10–0)

Second quarter

- (11:41) UCLA – Mateen Bhaghani 57-yard field goal (Drive: 11 plays, 36 yards, 4:14; Iowa 10–3)
- (8:05) UCLA – Titus Mokiao-Atimalala 2-yard pass from Ethan Garbers, Mateen Bhaghani kick (Drive: 6 plays, 45 yards, 3:23; Tied 10–10)
- (0:55) UCLA – Logan Loya 29-yard pass from Ethan Garbers, Mateen Bhaghani kick (Drive: 5 plays, 56 yards, 0:56; UCLA 17–10)

Third quarter

No scoring plays

Fourth quarter

- (11:27) IOWA – Kamari Moulton 1-yard run, Drew Stevens kick (Drive: 13 plays, 61 yards, 7:35; Tied 17–17)
- (4:49) UCLA – Mateen Bhaghani 27-yard field goal (Drive: 13 plays, 66 yards, 6:38; UCLA 20–17)

Statistics	IOWA	UCLA
First downs	12	23
Total yards	46–265	73–414
Rushing yards	31–80	39–211
Passing yards	185	203
Passing:	9–15–2	21–34–2
Time of possession	22:27	37:33

Team	Category	Player	Statistics
Iowa	Passing	Brendan Sullivan	6/9, 157 yards, 2 INT
Iowa	Rushing	Kaleb Johnson	18 carries, 49 yards, TD
Iowa	Receiving	Jacob Gill	6 receptions, 138 yards
UCLA	Passing	Ethan Garbers	21/34, 203 yards, 2 TD, 2 INT
UCLA	Rushing	T. J. Harden	20 carries, 125 yards
UCLA	Receiving	Logan Loya	5 receptions, 94 yards, TD

=== at Washington ===
UCLA Bruins (4–5) at Washington Huskies (5–5) – Game summary

Quarter	1	2	3	4	Total
Bruins	0	10	3	6	19
Huskies	7	7	3	14	31

at Husky Stadium • Seattle, Washington

- Date: November 15
- Game time: 6:00 p.m.
- Game weather: Cloudy
- Game attendance: 68,811
- Referee: Jeffrey Servinski
- TV announcers (FOX): Connor Onion (play-by-play) and Mark Helfrich (analyst)

Statistics	UCLA	WASH
First downs	21	20
Total yards	319	305
Rushing yards	52	123
Passing yards	267	182
Passing:	27–44–0	20–29–2
Time of possession	33:03	26:57

Team	Category	Player	Statistics
UCLA	Passing	Ethan Garbers	27/44, 267 yards, 2 TD
UCLA	Rushing	T.J. Harden	13 carries, 33 yards
UCLA	Receiving	Moliki Matavao	7 receptions, 68 yards, TD
Washington	Passing	Will Rogers	13/21, 115 yards, TD, 2 INT
Washington	Rushing	Jonah Coleman	21 carries, 95 yards, 2 TD
Washington	Receiving	Giles Jackson	8 receptions, 43 yards

=== vs USC (Victory Bell) ===
USC Trojans (5–5) vs UCLA Bruins (4–6) – Game summary

Quarter	1	2	3	4	Total
Trojans	3	6	0	10	19
Bruins	3	0	10	0	13

at Rose Bowl • Pasadena, California

- Date: November 23
- Game time: 7:30 p.m.
- Game weather: Cloudy
- Game attendance: 59,473
- Referee: Mark Kluczynski
- TV announcers (NBC): Paul Burmeister (play-by-play), Colt McCoy (analyst), and Lewis Johnson (sideline)

Game information

First quarter

- (11:32) UCLA - Mateen Bhaghani 51-yard field goal (Drive: 7 plays, 42 yards, 3:28; UCLA 3-0)
- (4:12) USC - Michael Lantz 19-yard field goal (Drive: 9 plays, 93 yards, 3:02; Tied 3-3)

Second quarter

- (9:25) USC - Michael Lantz 23-yard field goal (Drive: 12 plays 51 yards, 4:52; USC 6-3)
- (0:21) USC - Michael Lantz 22-yard field goal (Drive: 14 plays, 54 yards, 4:21; USC 9-3)

Third quarter

- (9:37) UCLA - Miliki Matavao 10-yard pass from Ethan Garbers (Mateen Bhaghani kick) (Drive: 7 plays, 54 yards, 4:21; UCLA 10-9)
- (0:04) UCLA - Mateen Bhaghani 29-yard field goal (Drive: 10 plays, 80 yards, 7:01; UCLA 13-9)

Fourth quarter

- (6:55) USC - Ja'Kobi Lane 4-yard pass from Jayden Maiava (Michael Lantz kick) (Drive: 3 plays, 49 yards, 1:21; USC 16-13)
- (2:09) USC - Michael Lantz 30-yard field goal (Drive: 8 plays, 21 yards, 2:50; USC 19-13)

Statistics	USC	UCLA
First downs	17	16
Total yards	346	376
Rushing yards	86	111
Passing yards	260	265
Passing:	20–36–0	20–29–0
Time of possession	29:03	30:57

Team	Category	Player	Statistics
USC	Passing	Jayden Maiava	19/35, 221 yards, TD
USC	Rushing	Woody Marks	18 carries, 76 yards
USC	Receiving	Kyron Hudson	6 receptions, 79 yards
UCLA	Passing	Ethan Garbers	20/29, 265 yards, TD
UCLA	Rushing	T. J. Harden	14 carries, 99 yards
UCLA	Receiving	J. Michael Sturdivant	5 receptions, 117 yards

=== vs Fresno State ===
Fresno State Bulldogs (6–5) vs UCLA Bruins (4–7) – Game summary

Quarter	1	2	3	4	Total
Bulldogs	0	10	0	3	13
Bruins	3	3	7	7	20

at Rose Bowl • Pasadena, California

- Date: November 30
- Game time: 12:30 p.m.
- Game weather: Sunny
- Game attendance: 35,018
- Referee: Greg Sujack
- TV announcers (BTN): Guy Haberman (play-by-play), Yogi Roth (analyst), and Rhett Lewis (sideline)

Game information

First quarter

- (4:36) UCLA – Mateen Bhaghani 23-yard field goal (Drive: 10 plays, 58 yards, 3:30; UCLA 3–0)

Second quarter

- (12:51) UCLA – Mateen Bhaghani 40-yard field goal (Drive: 4 plays, -10 yards, 1:11; UCLA 6–0)
- (7:29) FRES – Raylen Sharpe 7-yard pass from Mikey Keene, Dylan Lynch kick (Drive: 14 plays, 77 yards, 5:17; Fresno State 7–6)
- (0:00) FRES – Dylan Lynch 48-yard field goal (Drive: 10 plays, 60 yards, 1:18; Fresno State 10–6)

Third quarter

- (11:43) UCLA – T.J. Harden 5-yard run, Mateen Bhaghani kick (Drive: 4 plays, 56 yards, 1:56; UCLA 13–10)

Fourth quarter

- (1:38) UCLA – J. Michael Sturdivant 2-yard pass from Ethan Garbers, Mateen Bhaghani kick (Drive: 15 plays, 78 yards, 6:14; UCLA 20–10)
- (0:31) FRES – Dylan Lynch 42-yard field goal (Drive: 7 plays, 51 yards, 1:07; UCLA 20–13)

Statistics	FRES	UCLA
First downs	15	20
Total yards	281	363
Rushing yards	62	74
Passing yards	219	289
Passing: Comp–Att–Int	30–45–0	26–40–0
Time of possession	22:36	37:14

Team	Category	Player	Statistics
Fresno State	Passing	Mikey Keene	30/43, 219 yards, TD
Fresno State	Rushing	Bryson Donelson	6 carries, 41 yards
Fresno State	Receiving	Mac Dalena	7 receptions, 47 yards
UCLA	Passing	Ethan Garbers	26/40, 289 yards, TD
UCLA	Rushing	Anthony Frias II	13 carries, 43 yards
UCLA	Receiving	Moliki Matavao	8 receptions, 120 yards

== Awards and honors ==
Recipient	Award (Big-Ten Conference)	Week #	Date awarded	Ref.
Mateen Bhaghani	Special teams player of the week	1	September 2, 2024	
Ethan Garbers	Offensive Player of the Week	8	October 21, 2024	
Carson Schwesinger	All-Big Ten First Team	15	December 3, 2024	
Kain Medrano	All-Big Ten Third Team	15	December 3, 2024	
Jay Toia	All-Big Ten Honorable Mention	15	December 3, 2024	
Kaylin Moore	All-Big Ten Honorable Mention	15	December 3, 2024	

- December 10, 2024 – Carson Schwesinger was named to the AP All-Big Ten First Team
