= 2023 LA Bowl =

Postseason college football bowl game

2023 Starco Brands LA Bowl Hosted by Gronk
- 3rd LA Bowl
UCLA Bruins	Boise State Broncos
(7–5)	(8–5)
Pac-12	Mountain West
35	22
Head coach: Chip Kelly	Head coach: Spencer Danielson
	1	2	3	4	Total
UCLA	7	0	21	7	35
Boise State	6	10	0	6	22
- Date: December 16, 2023
- Season: 2023
- Stadium: SoFi Stadium
- Location: Inglewood, California
- MVP: Ethan Garbers (QB, UCLA) & Darius Muasau (LB, UCLA)
- Favorite: UCLA by 2.5
- National anthem: Rob Gronkowski and the New Directions Veterans Choir
- Referee: Gary Patterson (ACC)
- Attendance: 32,780

United States TV coverage
- Network: ABC; ESPN Radio
- Announcers: Dave Flemming (play-by-play), Brock Osweiler (analyst), and Kayla Burton (sideline) (ABC); Mike Couzens (play-by-play) and Tom Ramsey (analyst) (ESPN Radio)

International TV coverage
- Network: ESPN Brazil
- Announcers: Vinicius Moura (play-by-play) and Deivis Chiodini (analyst)

The 2023 LA Bowl was a college football bowl game played on December 16, 2023, at SoFi Stadium in Inglewood, California. The third annual LA Bowl featured the Boise State Broncos of the Mountain West Conference and the UCLA Bruins of the Pac-12 Conference. The game began at approximately 4:30 p.m. PST and was aired on ABC. The LA Bowl was one of the 2023–24 bowl games concluding the 2023 FBS football season. The game was sponsored by former National Football League player Rob Gronkowski and Starco Brands, and was officially known as the Starco Brands LA Bowl Hosted by Gronk.

== Teams ==
Consistent with conference tie-ins, the game featured the Boise State Broncos from the Mountain West Conference and the UCLA Bruins from the Pac-12 Conference.

This was the second meeting between Boise State and UCLA, as well as both teams' first appearance in the LA Bowl. The Bruins won their only prior meeting, defeating the Broncos, 38–7, on September 4, 1999.

=== Boise State ===
After losing their first two games to a pair of Power Five opponents, including eventual College Football Playoff qualifier Washington, the Broncos alternated wins and losses to reach a record of just 4–5 after the first week of November. However, Boise State won their final three games in Mountain West play, which set up a three-way tie between them, UNLV, and San Jose State. Per Mountain West tiebreaker rules, an aggregate of different computer rankings were used to determine who would play in the Mountain West Championship, with UNLV and Boise State making the cut and San Jose State being left out. Boise State soundly defeated UNLV, 44–20, to win the 2023 Mountain West conference title. The Broncos entered the LA Bowl with a record of 8–5.

=== UCLA ===
This was UCLA's final game as a member of the Pac-12, as the Bruins committed to join the Big Ten Conference for the 2024 season.

Led by true-freshman QB Dante Moore, the Bruins won their first three regular-season games, but suffered a 14–7 loss to Utah in their Pac-12 opener. Moore struggled mightily as the Bruins continued in Pac-12 play, throwing just three touchdowns vs. six interceptions. This led to his benching by head coach Chip Kelly in favor of junior Ethan Garbers. UCLA went just 4–5 in Pac-12 play, although they did earn a 38–20 win over their traditional rival, USC, with Garbers at quarterback. After the conclusion of the regular season, Moore announced his intention to enter the NCAA transfer portal. UCLA entered the LA Bowl with a record of 7–5.

== Game summary ==
2023 Starco Brands LA Bowl Hosted by Gronk

Quarter	1	2	3	4	Total
UCLA	7	0	21	7	35
Boise State	6	10	0	6	22

at SoFi Stadium • Inglewood, California

- Date: Saturday, December 16, 2023
- Game time: 4:30 p.m. PST
- Game weather: Sunny • Temperature: 68 °F (20 °C)
- Game attendance: 32,780
- Referee: Gary Patterson
- TV announcers (ABC): Dave Flemming (play-by-play), Brock Osweiler, and Kayla Burton (sideline)
- Box score

Game information

First Quarter

- (8:58) BSU – Jonah Dalmas 33 yard field goal (Drive: 10 plays, 59 yards, 4:10; Boise State 3–0)
- (3:36) BSU – Jonah Dalmas 23 yard field goal (Drive: 8 plays, 62 yards, 4:06; Boise State 6–0)
- (0:48) UCLA – Hudson Habermehl 5 yard pass from Collin Schlee, Blake Glessner kick (Drive: 6 plays, 83 yards, 2:48; UCLA 7–6)

Second Quarter

- (11:01) BSU – Jonah Dalmas 33 yard field goal (Drive: 10 plays, 59 yards, 4:47; Boise State 9–7)
- (4:33) BSU – George Holani 1 yard run, Jonah Dalmas kick (Drive: 8 plays, 52 yards, 4:54; Boise State 16–7)

Third Quarter

- (10:03) UCLA – Kyle Ford 5 yard pass from Ethan Garbers, Blake Glessner kick (Drive: 7 plays, 87 yards, 3:28; Boise State 16–14)
- (3:03) UCLA – TJ Harden 1 yard run, Blake Glessner kick (Drive: 9 plays, 72 yards, 3:43; UCLA 21–16)
- (0:19) UCLA – TJ Harden 14 yard run, Blake Glessner kick (Drive: 3 plays, 70 yards, 0:57; UCLA 28–16)

Fourth Quarter

- (6:11) UCLA – J. Michael Sturdivant 40 yard pass from Ethan Garbers, Blake Glessner kick (Drive: 1 play, 40 yards, 0:07; UCLA 35–16)
- (5:08) BSU – George Holani 66 yard run, two-point pass conversion failed (Drive: 3 plays, 75 yards, 1:03; UCLA 35–22)

=== Statistics ===
Statistics	BSU	UCLA
First downs	15	18
Plays–yards	58–332	64–510
Rushes–yards	37–215	36–280
Passing yards	117	230
Passing: comp–att–int	12–21–1	20–28–0
Time of possession	31:33	28:27

Team	Category	Player	Statistics
Boise State	Passing	CJ Tiller	12/21, 117 yards, INT
Boise State	Rushing	George Holani	17 carries, 138 yards, 2 TD
Boise State	Receiving	George Holani	1 reception, 45 yards
UCLA	Passing	Ethan Garbers	9/12, 152 yards, 2 TD
UCLA	Rushing	Collin Schlee	7 carries, 127 yards
UCLA	Receiving	J. Michael Sturdivant	4 receptions, 142 yards, TD
