= Ikaika Malloe =

American football coach (born 1974)

Current position
- Title: Run game coordinator & defensive line coach
- Team: Penn State
- Conference: Big Ten

Biographical details
- Born: July 6, 1974 (age 52); Waimanalo, Hawaii, U.S.

Playing career
- 1992–1995: Washington
- Positions: Safety & linebacker

Coaching career (HC unless noted)
- 1997–2001: Washington (GA)
- 2001–2003: Western Illinois (ST/DL)
- 2004–2007: UTEP (DL)
- 2008: Hawaii (ST/DT)
- 2009–2011: Yale (DC)
- 2012–2013: Portland State (ST/DT)
- 2014–2015: Utah State (DL)
- 2016–2019: Washington (DL)
- 2020: Washington (co-DC/DL)
- 2021: Washington (co-DC/OLB)
- 2022: UCLA (ST/OLB)
- 2023: UCLA (DL)
- 2024–2025: UCLA (DC/ILB)
- 2026–present: Penn State (RGC/DL)

Ikaika Malloe (born July 6, 1974) is an American football coach and former safety and linebacker who is the defensive line coach for the Penn State Nittany Lions. He played college football at Washington from 1992 to 1995.

== Playing career ==
Malloe graduated from Kamehameha Schools and chose to walk on at Washington. He helped lead the Huskies to a 1995 Pac-10 Championship while leading the team in interceptions with five.

== Coaching career ==
=== Washington (first stint) ===
Following his playing career at Washington, Malloe transitioned into a role as a student assistant, program coordinator and a graduate assistant. He earned his degree in sociology from the UW in 1997.

=== Western Illinois ===
Following his time at Washington, Malloe was hired as the special teams coordinator at Western Illinois. During his time with the Leathernecks, his defensive line ranked second in the conference in sacks, red zone defense, and opponents' third down conversions.

=== UTEP ===
Before the 2004 season, Malloe took a job as the defensive line coach at UTEP. During his tenure with the Miners he helped them to the 2005 GMAC Bowl.

=== Hawaii ===
Following his time at UTEP, Malloe took a job coaching special teams and the defensive line at Hawaii, helping guide them to a berth in the 2008 Hawai'i Bowl.

=== Yale ===
From 2009-11, Malloe spent three seasons as the defensive coordinator at Yale.

=== Portland State ===
After his time at Yale, Malloe took a job at Portland State where he coached All-America punter Kyle Loomis.

=== Utah State ===
In 2014, he took a job at Utah State where he helped the Aggies to a 10-4 record and a New Mexico Bowl win over UTEP.

=== Washington (second stint) ===
In 2016, Malloe returned to his alma mater, and in his first season as the Huskies' defensive line coach led a unit that led the Pac-12 in both total and scoring defense and led the nation in turnover margin. This contributed to the Huskies' 12-2 season and berth in the 2016 College Football Playoff. During his time with Washington, he coached Pac-12 Defensive Player of the Year and NFL first round draft pick, Vita Vea.

=== UCLA ===
Malloe was hired by UCLA prior to the 2021 Holiday Bowl, before its cancellation, to serve as an analyst for the Bruins. Afterwards, he assumed full time coaching duties. He was named the interim defensive coordinator for the final game of the 2023 season, a win over Boise State in the LA Bowl, after D'Anton Lynn left to become the defensive coordinator for USC. On January 3, 2024, head coach Chip Kelly announced that he had promoted Malloe to defensive coordinator. Kelly left the team to become the offensive coordinator for Ohio State, but Malloe remained on new head coach DeShaun Foster's staff for 2024.

In 2025, after Foster was fired following an 0–3 start to the season, Malloe and UCLA agreed to "mutually part ways", according to UCLA interim head coach Tim Skipper.

== Personal life ==
Malloe and his wife, Tara, have two daughters, Taylor and Sloane, and two sons, Jordan and Isaiah.
