= Justyn Martin =

American football player

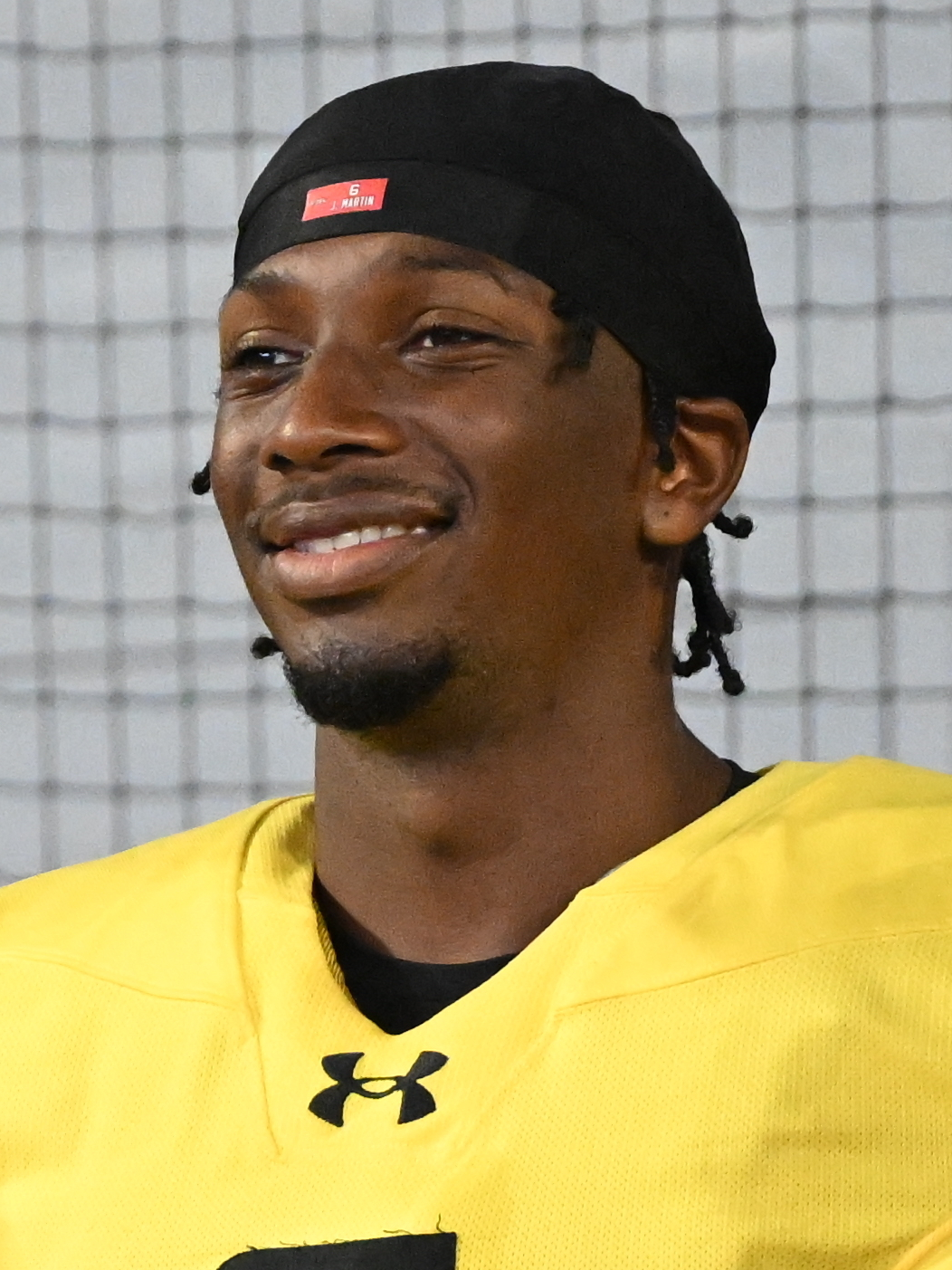
- Martin in 2025

No. 16 – Ohio State Buckeyes
- Position: Quarterback
- Class: Redshirt Senior

Personal information
- Listed height: 6 ft 4 in (1.93 m)
- Listed weight: 230 lb (104 kg)

Career information
- High school: Inglewood (Inglewood, California)
- College: UCLA (2022–2024); Maryland (2025); Ohio State (2026–present)
- Stats at ESPN

Justyn Martin is an American college football quarterback for the Ohio State Buckeyes. He previously played for the UCLA Bruins and Maryland Terrapins.

== Early life ==
Martin originally attended Junípero Serra High School in Gardena, California before transferring to Inglewood High School in Inglewood, California. As a senior, he had 41 passing touchdowns, with 13 of them coming in one game. He committed to the University of California, Los Angeles (UCLA) to play college football.

== College career ==
Martin did not play in any games his first year at UCLA in 2022 and redshirted. He appeared in two games as a redshirt freshman in 2023 and rushed twice for 11 yards. He entered his redshirt sophomore season in 2024 as the backup to Ethan Garbers. After an injury to Garbers, he started his first career game against Penn State. In his first career start he completed 22 of 30 passes for 167 yards and a touchdown.

Martin transferred to the University of Maryland following the 2024 season.

=== Statistics ===
Season	Team	Games			Passing								Rushing			
Season	Team	GP	GS	Record	Cmp	Att	Pct	Yds	Y/A	TD	Int	Rtg	Att	Yds	Avg	TD
2022	UCLA	0	0	—	Redshirted (redshirt)											
2023	UCLA	2	0	—	Did not record pass attempt								3	19	6.3	0
2024	UCLA	3	1	0–1	24	35	68.6	179	5.1	1	0	121.0	8	–9	–1.1	0
2025	Maryland	1	0	—	Did not record pass attempt								1	2	2.0	0
2026	Ohio State	0	0	—												
Career		6	1	0–1	24	35	68.6	179	5.1	1	0	121.0	12	12	1.0	0
