= Neuheisel =

Neuheisel is a surname. Notable people with the name include:

- Jerry Neuheisel (born 1992), American football coach and former player
- Rick Neuheisel (born 1961), American football coach, analyst, and former player
