= Alex Johnson (defensive back) =

American football player (born 2000)

Profile
- Position: Cornerback

Personal information
- Born: October 11, 2000 (age 26); Carson, California, U.S.
- Listed height: 6 ft 0 in (1.83 m)
- Listed weight: 185 lb (84 kg)

Career information
- High school: Loyola (Los Angeles, California)
- College: UCLA (2018−2023)
- NFL draft: 2024: undrafted

Career history
- New York Giants (2024)*; Indianapolis Colts (2024)*; Tennessee Titans (2025)*; Los Angeles Rams (2025)*
- * Offseason or practice squad member only
- Stats at Pro Football Reference

Alex Johnson (born October 11, 2000) is an American professional football cornerback. He played college football for the UCLA Bruins and was signed by the New York Giants as an undrafted free agent in 2024.

== Early life ==
Johnson attended Loyola High School in Los Angeles, where he was a multi-sport athlete in football, basketball, and track and field. His scholarship offer to play football at Montana was rescinded after a coaching change at the program, so he accepted a walk-on offer at UCLA.

== College career ==
Johnson earned an undergraduate degree in political science and a master's degree in transformative coaching and leadership at UCLA while playing on the school's football team; originally a walk-on, he was offered a scholarship after his second season. He played in one game in 2018, all twelve games in 2019, six games in 2020 (the season that was shortened due to the COVID-19 pandemic), ten games in 2021, and all thirteen games in 2022. In 2023, he played in all thirteen games, starting in eight of them. His five interceptions led the Pac-12 Conference. He recorded a fumble return touchdown against USC and a blocked punt against Stanford. He also intercepted a pass in UCLA's win against Boise State in the LA Bowl. He totaled 55 tackles and eleven passes defensed in 55 games at UCLA. He was named an honorable mention to the all-Pac-12 team for his senior year.

== Professional career ==
Pre-draft measurables
Height	Weight	Arm length	Hand span	Wingspan	40-yard dash	10-yard split	20-yard split	20-yard shuttle	Three-cone drill	Vertical jump	Broad jump
6 ft 0 1/2 in (1.84 m)	185 lb (84 kg)	32 in (0.81 m)	8 7/8 in (0.23 m)	6 ft 3 3/8 in (1.91 m)	4.44 s	1.57 s	2.58 s	4.34 s	7.00 s	37 in (0.94 m)	10 ft 7 in (3.23 m)
All values from Pro Day

=== New York Giants ===
In the days leading up to the 2024 NFL draft, Johnson met with the San Francisco 49ers, New Orleans Saints, and Houston Texans, though he ultimately went undrafted. He was signed as an undrafted free agent by the New York Giants after the draft and was waived on August 27, 2024. He signed to the Giants' practice squad the next day and was released on October 1.

=== Indianapolis Colts ===
Johnson signed with the Indianapolis Colts' practice squad on October 5, 2024. He signed a reserve/future contract with Indianapolis on January 6, 2025. The Colts waived Johnson on August 25.

=== Tennessee Titans ===
On September 29, 2025, Johnson signed with the Tennessee Titans' practice squad. He was waived on October 7 and re-signed to the practice squad on October 15. Johnson was waived on November 4.

=== Los Angeles Rams ===
On November 19, 2025, Johnson signed with the Los Angeles Rams' practice squad. He was released on December 23 and re-signed to the practice squad on December 24. Johnson was released on January 5, 2026, and was re-signed to the practice squad eight days later. He signed a reserve/future contract with Los Angeles on February 3. Johnson was waived by the Rams with an injury designation on August 29.
