= Carson Steele =

American football player (born 2002)

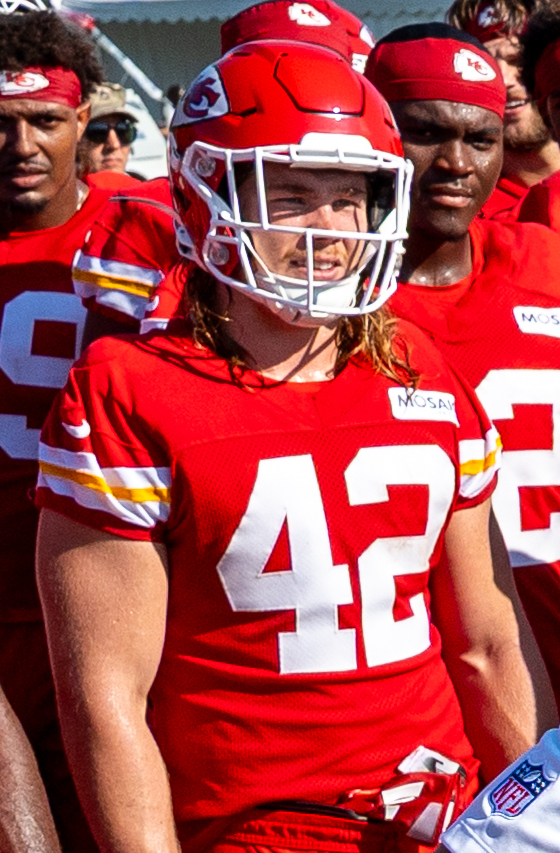
- Steele in 2025

Profile
- Position: Fullback

Personal information
- Born: October 21, 2002 (age 24); Greenwood, Indiana, U.S.
- Listed height: 6 ft 0 in (1.83 m)
- Listed weight: 228 lb (103 kg)

Career information
- High school: Center Grove (Greenwood)
- College: Ball State (2021–2022); UCLA (2023)
- NFL draft: 2024: undrafted

Career history
- Kansas City Chiefs (2024–2025); Philadelphia Eagles (2026)

Awards and highlights
- First-team All-MAC (2022)

Career NFL statistics as of 2026
- Rushing yards: 183
- Rushing average: 3.3
- Rushing touchdowns: 0
- Receptions: 7
- Receiving yards: 26
- Receiving touchdowns: 0
- Return yards: 138
- Stats at Pro Football Reference

Carson Steele (born October 21, 2002) is an American professional football fullback. He played college football for the Ball State Cardinals and the UCLA Bruins. He was signed by the Kansas City Chiefs as an undrafted free agent after the 2024 NFL draft. He has also played for the Philadelphia Eagles.

== Early life ==
Steele was raised in Greenwood, Indiana. He was born to Joseph Steele and Angela Berry-Steele. He grew up alongside his older sister, Kesslar Steele.

He attended Center Grove High School in Greenwood, rushing for 1,659 yards and 31 touchdowns as a senior in 2020. He tallied a total of 5,907 rushing yards during his high school career. He was selected as Mr. Football in Indiana after the 2020 season.

== College career ==
Steele signed a letter of intent to play college football at Ball State University in February 2021. As a freshman in 2021, he rushed for 891 yards and six touchdowns. During his freshman year, he squatted 615 pounds and was able to bench press 405 lbs. Barstool Sports' podcast "Unnecessary Roughness" called him "the most interesting man in CFB (college football)."

Prior to the 2022 season, Steele was selected by Bruce Feldman of The Athletic to his list of the top 100 "freaks" in college football. On November 8, 2022, he rushed for a career-high 198 yards and three touchdowns against Toledo. He also rushed for 192 yards against Kent State. He was awarded MAC West Offensive Player of the Week twice during the 2022 season. Through games played on November 19, 2022, Steele ranked ninth nationally with 1,376 rushing yards on 263 attempts (5.2 yards per carry).

On January 4, 2023, Steele committed to transfer to play at the University of California, Los Angeles, for the Bruins. He was again named to Bruce Feldman's "freak list" for a second straight time in 2023.

== Professional career ==
Pre-draft measurables
Height	Weight	Arm length	Hand span	Wingspan	40-yard dash	10-yard split	20-yard split	20-yard shuttle	Three-cone drill	Vertical jump	Broad jump	Bench press
6 ft 0 5/8 in (1.84 m)	228 lb (103 kg)	30 1/2 in (0.77 m)	9 5/8 in (0.24 m)	6 ft 1 5/8 in (1.87 m)	4.77 s	1.60 s	2.70 s	4.36 s	7.07 s	37.5 in (0.95 m)	9 ft 8 in (2.95 m)	28 reps
All values from Pro Day

=== Kansas City Chiefs ===
==== 2024 season ====
Steele was signed by the Kansas City Chiefs as an undrafted free agent after the 2024 NFL draft. Steele made the Chiefs' initial 53 man roster listed as a fullback instead of his collegiate position of running back.

Steele made his NFL debut in Week 1 of the 2024 NFL Season against the Baltimore Ravens. He had 2 carries for 3 yards along returning a kick for 28 yards in a 27–20 win for the Chiefs.

In Week 3 against the Atlanta Falcons, he had 17 rushing attempts and 72 rushing yards, along with recording 1 reception for 2 yards in the Chiefs' 22–17 win.

As a rookie, Steele played both fullback (his designated position) and running back on offense and occasionally returned kicks on special teams. He was used mainly as a run blocker and short yardage runner.

Steele played a total of 199 offensive snaps in his rookie season. He played 190 snaps in the backfield, 2 snaps as a tight end, 1 as a slot receiver, and 6 out wide. Steele finished his rookie season with 183 rushing yards on 56 attempts and 26 receiving yards on 7 receptions. He also returned 5 kicks for 138 yards. Steele was an alternate for the 2025 Pro Bowl and finished second behind Patrick Ricard of the Baltimore Ravens among AFC fullbacks in Pro Bowl voting.

==== 2025 season ====
On August 26, 2025, Steele was waived by the Chiefs as part of final roster cuts and re-signed to the practice squad the next day.

=== Philadelphia Eagles ===
On January 13, 2026, Steele signed a reserve/future contract with the Philadelphia Eagles. On August 29, he was waived by the Eagles; two days later, Philadelphia re–signed Steele their practice squad. On October 9, Steele was promoted to the active roster. He was waived/injured on October 20.

== Career statistics ==
=== NFL ===
Regular season

Year	Team	Games		Rushing					Receiving					Returning					Fumbles	
Year	Team	GP	GS	Att	Yds	Avg	Lng	TD	Rec	Yds	Avg	Lng	TD	Rt	Yds	Avg	Lng	TD	Fum	Lost
2024	KC	17	3	56	183	3.3	9	0	7	26	3.7	9	0	5	138	27.6	31	0	3	2
Career		17	3	56	183	3.3	9	0	7	26	3.7	9	0	5	138	27.6	31	0	3	2

=== College ===
Season	Team	Games		Rushing				Receiving			
Season	Team	GP	GS	Att	Yards	Avg	TD	Rec	Yards	Avg	TD
2021	Ball State	13	7	192	891	4.6	6	12	157	13.1	1
2022	Ball State	12	12	289	1,556	5.4	14	29	166	5.7	1
2023	UCLA	12	9	167	847	5.1	6	17	163	9.6	2
Career		37	28	648	3,294	5.1	26	58	486	8.4	4
