= Jake Heimlicher =

American football player (born 1999)

Profile
- Position: Defensive lineman

Personal information
- Born: October 5, 1999 (age 27)
- Listed height: 6 ft 4 in (1.93 m)
- Listed weight: 255 lb (116 kg)

Career information
- College: Penn (2018–2022); UCLA (2023)

Career history
- 2024–2025: Ottawa Redblacks*
- * Offseason or practice squad member only

Awards and highlights
- First-team All-Ivy League (2022)
- Stats at CFL.ca

Jake Heimlicher (born October 5, 1999) is an American professional football defensive end. He was most recently a member of the Ottawa Redblacks of the Canadian Football League (CFL). He played college football at UCLA and Penn.

== Early life ==
Heimlicher grew up in Aurora, Colorado and attended Regis Jesuit High School. In his high school football career, he achieved a state leading record of .22 sacks. He committed to play college football at Penn over offers from Air Force, Brown, California, Colorado, Hawaii, Montana State, Northern Colorado, Princeton and Wyoming.

== College career ==
=== Penn ===
During Heimlicher's true freshman season in 2018, he only appeared in one game which was against Princeton. During the 2019 season, he appeared in all 10 games as a linebacker and finished the season with 14 tackles, 2.0 tackles for loss and 1.0 sacks. Due to the COVID-19 pandemic, the Ivy League canceled fall sports for the 2020 season. During the 2021 season, he appeared and started in all 10 games while on the defensive line and finished the season with 51 tackles, 12.5 tackles for loss, 7.5 sacks and 12 quarterback hurries. During the 2022 season, he appeared in all 10 games and was the co-captain of the team. He finished the season with 47 tackles with 28 solos, nine sacks and 13.0 tackles for a loss of 51 yards. He was named the Buck Buchanan Award finalist and the FCS Defensive Player of the Year.

On November 22, 2022, Heimlicher announced that he would be entering the transfer portal. On November 29, 2022, he announced that he would be transferring to UCLA.

=== UCLA ===
Heimlicher enrolled early in January 2023 and participated in the spring training. He made his debut as a Bruin in the Week 1 game against Coastal Carolina.

== Professional career ==
Pre-draft measurables
Height	Weight	Arm length	Hand span	40-yard dash	10-yard split	20-yard split	20-yard shuttle	Three-cone drill	Vertical jump	Broad jump
6 ft 4 1/8 in (1.93 m)	247 lb (112 kg)	31 7/8 in (0.81 m)	9 3/4 in (0.25 m)	4.74 s	1.63 s	2.72 s	4.52 s	7.02 s	34.0 in (0.86 m)	10 ft 0 in (3.05 m)
All values from Pro Day

After going undrafted in the 2024 NFL draft, Heimlicher joined the Ottawa Redblacks' practice roster on October 8, 2024. He was part of the final training camp cuts on May 31, 2025.
