= Jerry Neuheisel =

American football player and coach (born 1992)

Northwestern Wildcats
- Title: Quarterbacks coach

Personal information
- Born: April 24, 1992 (age 34); Los Angeles, California, U.S.
- Listed height: 6 ft 1 in (1.85 m)
- Listed weight: 200 lb (91 kg)

Career information
- Position: Quarterback (No. 15)
- High school: Loyola (Los Angeles, California)
- College: UCLA (2012–2015)

Career history

Playing
- Obic Seagulls (2016)

Coaching
- Texas A&M (2017) Quality control coach; UCLA (2018–2025); Graduate assistant (2018–2020); Wide receivers coach (2021–2023); Tight ends coach (2024); Assistant head coach & tight ends coach (2025); Interim offensive coordinator, assistant head coach & tight ends coach (2025); Northwestern (2026–present) Quarterbacks coach

Richard Gerald Neuheisel III (/ˈnuːhaɪzəl/; born April 24, 1992) is an American college football coach and former quarterback who is the quarterbacks coach for the Northwestern Wildcats. He played collegiately for the UCLA Bruins and a season professionally with the Obic Seagulls of the Japanese X-League. He previously served in multiple assistant coaching roles for UCLA.

== Early life ==
Neuheisel was born on April 24, 1992, at the UCLA Medical Center in Los Angeles. His father, Rick Neuheisel, was a position coach for the UCLA Bruins football team at this time, later becoming the head coach of UCLA in 2008. Jerry attended Loyola High School in Los Angeles and played three seasons at quarterback.

Neuheisel was a three-star recruit as a quarterback coming out of high school, but was only pursued in his recruitment by UCLA. He accepted an athletic scholarship to play for the Bruins.

== Playing career ==
=== College ===
==== 2012 ====
During his freshman season, Neuheisel did not see any game action. He was redshirted and served as a scout team quarterback during the 2012 season.

==== 2013 ====
Neuheisel saw the field for the first time in his college career during UCLA's 2013 season as the Bruins' backup quarterback to future National Football League (NFL) player Brett Hundley. He completed 11 of his 13 pass attempts for 124 passing yards and 0 touchdowns or interceptions.

==== 2014 ====
Neuheisel once again was the backup to Hundley in 2014. Following an injury to Hundley in a game against Texas, Neuheisel had to finish out the game as the Bruins' quarterback. He succeeded, leading the team to a comeback win and finishing the game with 178 passing yards and two touchdowns, eventually being carried off the field by his teammates afterwards following the performance. Neuheisel compiled a season stat line of 26 completed passes out of 39 attempts for 194 yards, while registering two touchdowns and one interception.

==== 2015 ====
After Hundley entered the 2015 NFL draft, there was a quarterback competition entering 2015 between Neuheisel, by then a redshirt junior, and a newcomer in five-star true freshman Josh Rosen. The starting job went to Rosen, who credited Neuheisel for being "selfless" and helping him during the competition. Head coach Jim Mora praised Neuheisel's attitude throughout the process. Mora described him as an ideal student-athlete and the "epitome of a UCLA Bruin" who loved representing the school, adding further that he told Neuheisel after delivering the disappointing news that his hope "is that some day, I can be sitting up in the Rose Bowl stands watching him as the head coach of UCLA, because I think that is one of his dreams."

Neuheisel completed only 5 of 18 pass attempts this season for 53 yards, throwing 2 interceptions and 0 touchdowns. This was the last season Neuheisel played of college football, as he felt it would hurt to continue to be the backup to Rosen. Neuheisel finished his college career with 371 passing yards, 2 passing touchdowns and 3 interceptions across three seasons of game action. He was a Pac-12 All Academic honoree each season he was with the Bruins.

=== Professional ===
Following the 2015 season, Neuheisel signed with and played for the Obic Seagulls of the Japanese X-League in 2016. He guided the Seagulls to the league's championship game, where they lost, 16–3. Over the course of the season, Neuheisel completed 67.5% of his pass attempts for 1,456 yards and 12 touchdowns. During his time in Japan, he confirmed his former UCLA head coach's belief that Jerry wanted someday to be the head coach of the UCLA Bruins, telling reporters that while he did not get to "put roses on my shoulder" during his college football playing career, referencing the Rose Bowl Game tradition, "I'm going to come back and put the roses on the players as a coach."

Neuheisel did not re-sign with the Seagulls following the season's end, instead pursuing a career in coaching.

== Coaching career ==
=== Texas A&M ===
Neuheisel began his coaching career as an offensive quality control assistant with the Texas A&M Aggies in 2017.

=== UCLA ===
Neuheisel became a graduate assistant for the UCLA Bruins in 2018. He served in this capacity through the 2020 season, before being promoted to wide receivers coach beginning in 2021. Around this time, he was named to 247Sports' 30Under30 list for up-and-coming college football coaches under 30 years old, with the article touting Neuheisel's recruiting acumen and describing him as someone his peers believed could be "in and around coaching as long as he wants to be."

Neuheisel remained in that role through 2023 before becoming the tight ends coach in 2024. Head coach DeShaun Foster added the title of assistant head coach to his responsibilities as coach of the tight ends to begin the 2025 season. However, Foster as well as offensive coordinator Tino Sunseri mutually parted ways with UCLA on September 30, 2025, following a poor start to the year and a 17–14 road defeat to Northwestern. Neuheisel was then named as the interim offensive coordinator for the remainder of the season.

Four days after his sudden promotion, UCLA hosted a top-10 ranked Penn State and handed the Nittany Lions a stunning defeat, winning 42–37. Following the victory in his play-calling debut, Neuheisel was given a Gatorade bath and carried off the field by his players.

Following the regular season, Bob Chesney was hired as the next permanent head coach at UCLA, and Neuheisel was not retained on the staff.

=== Northwestern ===
In January 2026, Neuheisel was hired as the quarterbacks coach for the Northwestern Wildcats. Neuheisel joined former UCLA head coach Chip Kelly, who had just been hired as the Wildcats' offensive coordinator.

== Personal life ==
Jerry Neuheisel is the oldest of three siblings and the son of UCLA graduates Susan and Rick. His younger brothers are Jack, who played wide receiver at Southern Methodist University for the SMU Mustangs, and Joe. He got married in 2020.

His father, Rick Neuheisel, played quarterback for the Bruins from 1981–83 before embarking on a coaching career that began at his alma mater as a graduate assistant in 1986. Rick eventually became the head coach of UCLA in 2008 and coached in that capacity until he was fired following the 2011 season.
