= Ethan Garbers =

American football player (born 2002)

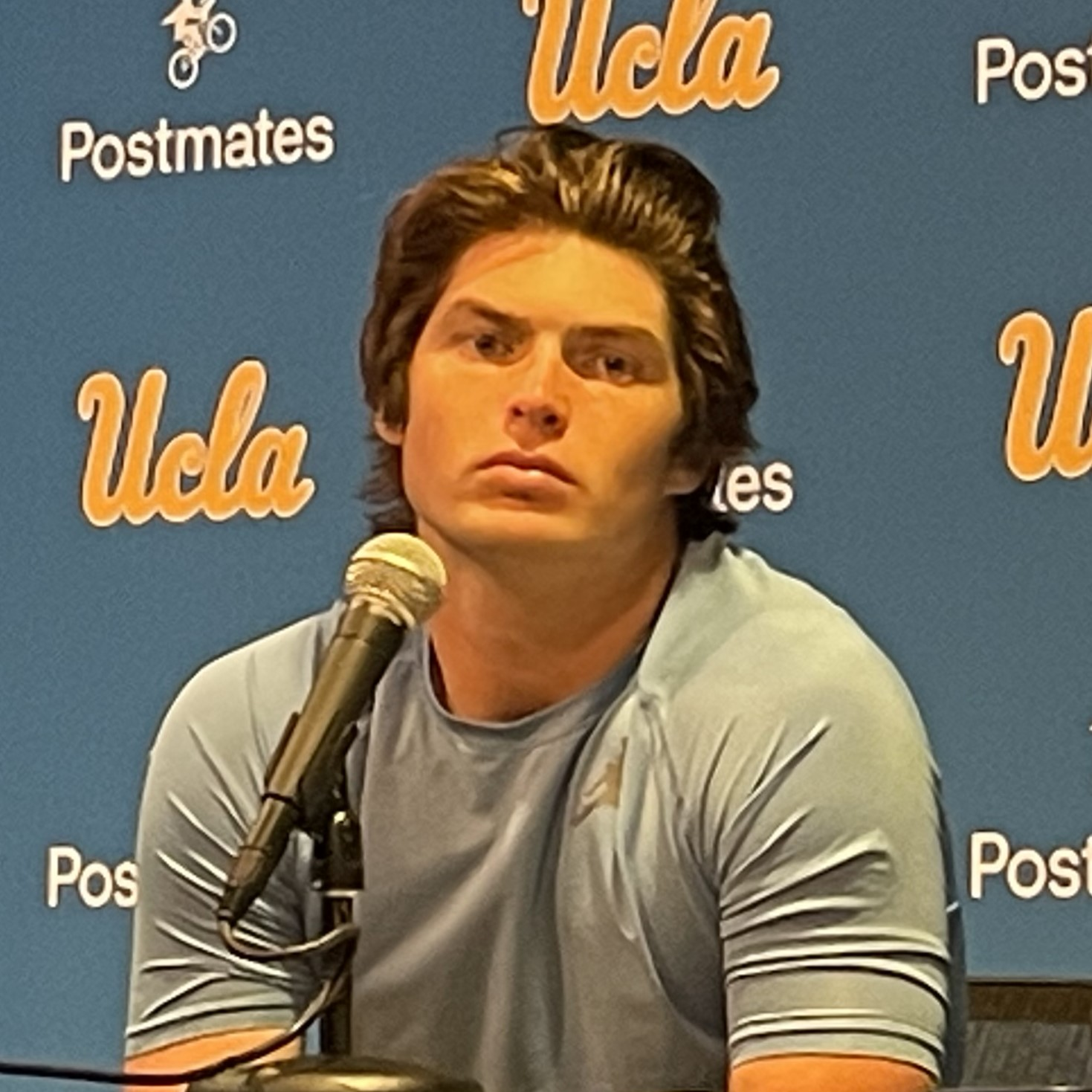
- Garbers in 2024

Profile
- Position: Quarterback

Personal information
- Born: July 28, 2002 (age 24); Newport Beach, California, U.S.
- Listed height: 6 ft 2 in (1.88 m)
- Listed weight: 207 lb (94 kg)

Career information
- High school: Corona del Mar (Newport Beach, California)
- College: Washington (2020); UCLA (2021–2024)
- NFL draft: 2025: undrafted

Career history
- Carolina Panthers (2025)*; Madrid Bravos (2025-2026)*; Frankfurt Galaxy (2026)
- * Offseason or practice squad member only

Ethan Garbers (born July 28, 2002) is an American professional football quarterback who is currently a free agent. He played college football for the Washington Huskies and UCLA Bruins.

== Early life ==
Garbers hometown is Newport Beach, California, where he attended Corona del Mar High School. In his high school career, he completed 643 of his 947 passes for 9,462 yards and 128 touchdowns to just 15 interceptions. Garbers also rushed for 784 yards and 18 touchdowns. Garbers committed to play college football at the University of Washington.

== College career ==
=== Washington ===
Garbers did not take a single snap for Washington as a freshman in 2020. After the season, he entered the NCAA transfer portal.

=== UCLA ===
Garbers transferred to the University of California, Los Angeles, to continue his college career. In week 10 of the 2021 season, he made his first career start, where he completed 27 of his 44 passes for 265 yards, two touchdowns, and one interception, but the Bruins fell to Utah 44–24. Garbers finished the 2021 season going 31 for 51 on his passes for 305 yards and two touchdowns to two interceptions. In 2022 he went 26 for 37 on passing attempts for 294 yards and two touchdowns to two interceptions. In 2023, Garbers was named the starting quarterback for UCLA's season opener against Coastal Carolina, beating out Dante Moore and Collin Schlee. However, head coach Chip Kelly started Moore in the following game. Garbers was the starting quarterback for the Bruins for the 2024 season.

== Professional career ==
Pre-draft measurables
Height	Weight	Arm length	Hand span	40-yard dash	10-yard split	20-yard split	20-yard shuttle	Three-cone drill	Vertical jump	Broad jump
6 ft 2 3/8 in (1.89 m)	207 lb (94 kg)	32 in (0.81 m)	9 1/8 in (0.23 m)	4.96 s	1.80 s	2.87 s	4.48 s	7.41 s	34.0 in (0.86 m)	9 ft 0 in (2.74 m)
All values from Pro Day

=== Carolina Panthers ===
On May 8, 2025, Garbers signed with the Carolina Panthers as an undrafted free agent after going unselected in the 2025 NFL draft. He was waived by the Panthers ahead of training camp on July 23.

=== Madrid Bravos ===
On December 9, 2025, Garbers was signed by the Madrid Bravos of the European Football Alliance (EFA). However, he was released on March 10, 2026, when the team ceased operations.

=== Frankfurt Galaxy ===
On March 19, 2026, Garbers was signed by the Frankfurt Galaxy of the European Football Alliance. Garbers was cut by the Galaxy on July 24.

== Career statistics ==
Season	Team	Games			Passing								Rushing			
Season	Team	GP	GS	Record	Comp	Att	Pct	Yards	Avg	TD	Int	Rate	Att	Yards	Avg	TD
2020	Washington	Redshirt (redshirt)														
2021	UCLA	12	1	0–1	31	51	60.8	305	6.0	2	2	116.1	18	31	1.7	0
2022	UCLA	6	0	0–0	26	37	70.3	294	7.9	2	2	144.0	7	0	0.0	2
2023	UCLA	11	6	4–2	98	146	67.1	1,136	7.8	11	3	153.2	35	127	3.6	0
2024	UCLA	11	11	5–6	235	363	64.7	2,727	7.5	16	11	136.3	83	136	1.6	1
Career		40	18	9–9	390	597	65.3	4,462	7.5	31	18	139.2	143	294	2.1	3

== Personal life ==
Garbers' brother Chase played quarterback in college for the California Golden Bears.
