= Moliki Matavao =

American football player (born 2003)

No. 80 – New Orleans Saints
- Position: Tight end
- Roster status: Injured reserve

Personal information
- Born: March 17, 2003 (age 23); Las Vegas, Nevada, U.S.
- Listed height: 6 ft 6 in (1.98 m)
- Listed weight: 263 lb (119 kg)

Career information
- High school: Liberty (Henderson, Nevada)
- College: Oregon (2021–2022); UCLA (2023–2024)
- NFL draft: 2025: 7th round, 248th overall pick

Career history
- New Orleans Saints (2025–present)

Career NFL statistics as of 2025
- Receptions: 2
- Receiving yards: 10
- Stats at Pro Football Reference

Moliki Faatui Matavao (born March 17, 2003) is an American professional football tight end for the New Orleans Saints of the National Football League (NFL). He played college football for the Oregon Ducks and UCLA Bruins. Matavao was selected by the Saints in the seventh round of the 2025 NFL draft.

== Early life ==
Matavao attended Liberty High School in Henderson, Nevada, and was rated as a four-star recruit. He committed to play college football for the Oregon Ducks over offers from Georgia, Penn State, and UCLA.

== College career ==
=== Oregon ===
As a freshman in 2021, Matavao recorded nine receptions for 75 yards and a touchdown for Oregon. In 2022, he totaled ten receptions for 134 yards and a touchdown, while also adding a touchdown on the ground. After the 2022 season, Matavao entered his name into the NCAA transfer portal.

=== UCLA ===
Matavao transferred to play for the UCLA Bruins. In 2023, he hauled in 14 receptions for 266 yards and two touchdowns. In week 12, Matavao tallied seven receptions for 68 yards and a touchdown versus Washington. In the 2024 regular-season finale, Matavao notched eight receptions for 120 yards versus Fresno State.

== Professional career ==
Pre-draft measurables
Height	Weight	Arm length	Hand span	Wingspan	40-yard dash	10-yard split	20-yard split	Vertical jump	Broad jump
6 ft 5 5/8 in (1.97 m)	260 lb (118 kg)	32 1/2 in (0.83 m)	9 1/2 in (0.24 m)	6 ft 6 7/8 in (2.00 m)	4.81 s	1.60 s	2.84 s	32.5 in (0.83 m)	9 ft 6 in (2.90 m)
All values from NFL Combine

Matavao was drafted by the New Orleans Saints with the 248th overall pick in the seventh round of the 2025 NFL draft. On September 20, 2025, Matavao was waived by New Orleans after Kevin Austin Jr. was signed to the active roster. He was re-signed by New Orleans on September 23, taking the roster spot of Austin, who was waived. On October 4, Matavao was waived and was re-signed to the practice squad three days later. He was promoted to the active roster on December 26.

On August 24, 2026, Matavao was placed on season–ending injured reserve due to a knee injury suffered in the team's preseason matchup against the Los Angeles Rams.

== Personal life ==
Matavao is of Polynesian ancestry.
