= Oluwafemi Oladejo =

American football player (born 2003)

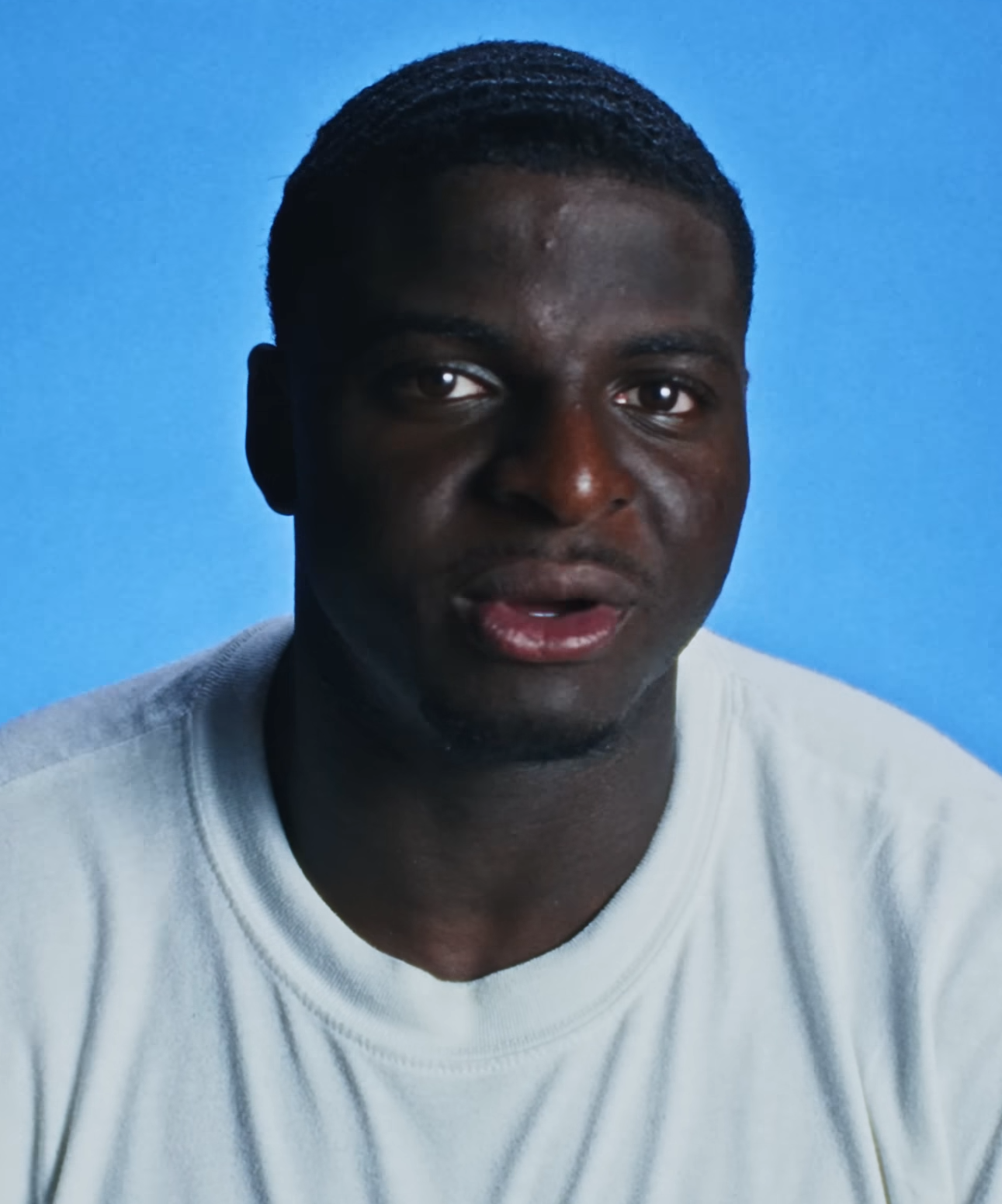
- Oladejo in 2025

No. 7 – Tennessee Titans
- Position: Defensive end
- Roster status: Active

Personal information
- Born: September 20, 2003 (age 23); Sacramento, California, U.S.
- Listed height: 6 ft 3 in (1.91 m)
- Listed weight: 259 lb (117 kg)

Career information
- High school: Cosumnes Oaks (Elk Grove, California)
- College: California (2021–2022); UCLA (2023–2024)
- NFL draft: 2025: 2nd round, 52nd overall pick

Career history
- Tennessee Titans (2025–present)

Career NFL statistics as of Week 8, 2026
- Total tackles: 25
- Sacks: 1
- Touchdowns: 1
- Stats at Pro Football Reference

Oluwafemi "Femi" Moses Oladejo (born September 20, 2003) is an American professional football defensive end for the Tennessee Titans of the National Football League (NFL). He played college football for the California Golden Bears and UCLA Bruins. Oladejo was selected by the Titans in the second round of the 2025 NFL draft.

== Early life ==
Oladejo was born on September 20, 2003, in Sacramento, California. His parents split when he was nine years old, when he would move to Texas with his father, Rotimi Oladejo, spending most of his childhood in Houston, before eventually moving back to Elk Grove, California with his mother. He attended Cosumnes Oaks High School in Elk Grove and was rated as a three-star recruit and committed to play college football for the California Golden Bears over other schools such as Arizona and Colorado.

== College career ==
=== California ===
In two seasons with the Golden Bears in 2021 and 2022, Oladejo appeared in 21 games, where he totaled 129 tackles with eight being for a loss, a sack, a pass deflection, an interception, a fumble recovery, and a forced fumble. He entered his name into the NCAA transfer portal.

=== UCLA ===
Oladejo transferred to play for the UCLA Bruins. During his two-year career with the Bruins from 2023 to 2024, he appeared in 25 games, where he notched 111 tackles with 17 being for a loss, and five sacks, five pass deflections, an interception, and two fumble recoveries. He moved from middle linebacker to defensive end in 2024.

== Professional career ==
Pre-draft measurables
Height	Weight	Arm length	Hand span	Wingspan	Vertical jump	Broad jump	Bench press
6 ft 3 1/4 in (1.91 m)	259 lb (117 kg)	33 3/8 in (0.85 m)	9 3/4 in (0.25 m)	6 ft 10 1/8 in (2.09 m)	36.5 in (0.93 m)	10 ft 0 in (3.05 m)	20 reps
All values from NFL Combine

Oladejo was selected by the Tennessee Titans with the 52nd pick in the second round of the 2025 NFL draft. On October 14, 2025, Oladejo was placed on injured reserve due to a fractured leg suffered in Week 6 against the Las Vegas Raiders.

== Personal life ==
Oladejo's parents were born in Nigeria. His name Oluwafemi means "God loves me" in the Yoruba language.
