= J. Michael Sturdivant =

American football player (born 2002)

No. 87 – Green Bay Packers
- Position: Wide receiver
- Roster status: Active

Personal information
- Born: September 6, 2002 (age 24); Highland Village, Texas, U.S.
- Listed height: 6 ft 3 in (1.91 m)
- Listed weight: 207 lb (94 kg)

Career information
- High school: Edward S. Marcus (Flower Mound, Texas)
- College: California (2021–2022); UCLA (2023–2024); Florida (2025)
- NFL draft: 2026: undrafted

Career history
- Green Bay Packers (2026–present)

Career NFL statistics as of Week 10, 2026
- Receptions: 6
- Receiving yards: 75
- Receiving touchdowns: 1
- Return yards: 151
- Stats at Pro Football Reference

J. Michael Sturdivant (born Michael Anthony Sturdivant Jr.; September 6, 2002) is an American professional football wide receiver for the Green Bay Packers of the National Football League (NFL). He played college football for the California Golden Bears, the UCLA Bruins and the Florida Gators. He was signed as an undrafted free agent by the Packers in 2026.

== Early life ==
Sturdivant grew up in Highland Village, Texas and attended Edward S. Marcus High School. As a junior, he caught 87 passes for 1,125 yards and 10 touchdowns. Sturdivant was rated a four-star recruit and committed to play college football at California over offers from LSU, Oklahoma, and UCLA.

== College career ==
=== California ===
Sturdivant began his college career at California. He played in four games during his true freshman season before redshirting the year. As a redshirt freshman, Sturdivant caught 65 passes for 755 receiving yards and seven touchdowns, and was named a Freshman All-American by The Athletic and honorable mention All-Pac-12 Conference. After the season he entered the NCAA transfer portal.

=== UCLA ===
Sturdivant ultimately transferred to UCLA.

On December 10, 2024, Sturdivant announced that he would enter the transfer portal for the second time.

=== Florida ===
On December 20, 2024, Sturdivant decided to transfer to Florida.

== Professional career ==
Pre-draft measurables
Height	Weight	Arm length	Hand span	Wingspan	40-yard dash	10-yard split	20-yard split	Vertical jump	Broad jump
6 ft 2 7/8 in (1.90 m)	207 lb (94 kg)	32 7/8 in (0.84 m)	9 1/2 in (0.24 m)	6 ft 6 1/4 in (1.99 m)	4.40 s	1.54 s	2.57 s	39.0 in (0.99 m)	10 ft 11 in (3.33 m)
All values from NFL Combine

Sturdivant was signed as an undrafted free agent by the Green Bay Packers after the conclusion of the 2026 NFL draft. He caught his first NFL touchdown during week 10 against the Minnesota Vikings.

== Personal life ==
Sturdivant's great uncle, Floyd Little, was a Hall of Fame running back for the Denver Broncos.
