= TJ Harden =

American football player (born 2004)

Profile
- Position: Running back

Personal information
- Born: April 23, 2004 (age 22)
- Listed height: 6 ft 0 in (1.83 m)
- Listed weight: 218 lb (99 kg)

Career information
- High school: Inglewood (Inglewood, California)
- College: UCLA (2022–2024); SMU (2025)
- NFL draft: 2026: undrafted

Career history
- Cleveland Browns (2026)*; Seattle Seahawks (2026)*
- * Offseason or practice squad member only

Tomarion "TJ" Harden (born April 23, 2004) is an American professional football running back. He played college football for the SMU Mustangs and the UCLA Bruins.

== Early life ==
Harden attended Inglewood High School located in Inglewood, California. Coming out of high school, he was rated as a three-star recruit, where he committed to play college football for the UCLA Bruins over other offers from other schools such as Michigan, Mississippi State, and Utah.

== College career ==
=== UCLA ===
During his freshman season in 2022, Harden played in six games, rushing for 325 yards and two touchdowns on 44 carries. In week 13 of the 2023 season, he rushed for 142 yards and a touchdown on 22 carries, while also hauling in a touchdown in an upset win over rival USC. Harden finished the 2023 season, rushing for 827 yards and eight touchdowns. In week 11 of the 2024 season, he rushed for 125 yards in a win against Iowa. Harden finished the 2024 season, rushing 124 times for 506 yards and two touchdowns, while also hauling in 40 receptions for 368 yards and a touchdown, where after the conclusion of the season, he decided to enter his name into the NCAA transfer portal.

=== SMU ===
Harden transferred to play for the SMU Mustangs. In week one of the 2025 season, he rushed for 42 yards on eight carries in a win over East Texas A&M.

== Professional career ==
Pre-draft measurables
Height	Weight	Arm length	Hand span	Wingspan	40-yard dash	10-yard split	20-yard split	20-yard shuttle	Three-cone drill	Vertical jump	Broad jump	Bench press
6 ft 0 1/4 in (1.84 m)	218 lb (99 kg)	31 1/2 in (0.80 m)	9 1/4 in (0.23 m)	6 ft 3 3/4 in (1.92 m)	4.59 s	1.68 s	2.63 s	4.46 s	7.40 s	30.0 in (0.76 m)	9 ft 11 in (3.02 m)	14 reps
All values from Pro Day

=== Cleveland Browns ===
On May 8, 2026, Harden signed with the Cleveland Browns as an undrafted free agent. He was waived by the Browns on August 3.

=== Seattle Seahawks ===
On August 6, 2026, Harden signed with Seattle Seahawks. On August 15, Harden made his preseason debut in Week 1 of the 2026 preseason against the Dallas Cowboys. He recorded two carries for one yard and recovered a fumbled punt in the 17–7 loss. Harden was waived by the Seahawks on August 17.

On August 19, a Louisiana federal court granted Harden and other former college players a temporary restraining order allowing them to pursue an additional season of NCAA eligibility in 2026. The ruling applied to players who had exhausted their traditional four seasons of eligibility, including Harden, who played four seasons without a redshirt from 2022 to 2025. Following the ruling, Harden announced plans to enter the NCAA transfer portal and pursue a return to college football.
