= Collin Schlee =

American football player (born 2001)

Profile
- Position: Quarterback

Personal information
- Born: May 30, 2001 (age 25)
- Listed height: 6 ft 3 in (1.91 m)
- Listed weight: 210 lb (95 kg)

Career information
- High school: Oakdale (Ijamsville, Maryland)
- College: Kent State (2019–2022); UCLA (2023); Virginia Tech (2024)
- NFL draft: 2025: undrafted

Career history
- Washington Commanders (2025)*
- * Offseason or practice squad member only

Awards and highlights
- Third-team All-MAC (2022)

Collin Schlee (born May 30, 2001) is an American football quarterback. He played college football for the Kent State Golden Flashes, UCLA Bruins, and Virginia Tech Hokies.

== Early life ==
Schlee grew up in Ijamsville, Maryland, and attended Oakdale High School, where he played football and basketball. He passed for 1,503 yards and 23 touchdowns as a senior. Schlee committed to play college football at Kent State.

== College career ==
=== Kent State ===
Schlee redshirted his true freshman season with the Kent State Golden Flashes. He spent his redshirt freshman season as the backup to starter Dustin Crum. Schlee continued as Crum's backup as a redshirt sophomore and played in ten games, 17-of-24 pass attempts for 238 yards and one touchdown and also rushing for 127 yards and three touchdowns. He was named the Golden Flashes' starting quarterback entering his redshirt junior season. Schlee completed 157-of-266 passes for 2,109 yards with 13 touchdowns and five interceptions while also rushing for 489 yards and four touchdowns. Following the end of the season, he entered the NCAA transfer portal.

=== UCLA ===
Schlee played the 2023 season with the UCLA Bruins after transferring.

=== Virginia Tech ===
Schlee transferred again in 2024 and played with the Virginia Tech Hokies.

=== Statistics ===
College statistics
Season	Team	Games			Passing								Rushing			
Season	Team	GP	GS	Record	Comp	Att	Pct	Yards	Avg	TD	Int	Rate	Att	Yards	Avg	TD
2019	Kent State	Redshirt														
2020	Kent State	3	0	0−0	7	13	53.8	113	8.7	2	0	177.6	12	85	7.1	1
2021	Kent State	10	0	0−0	17	24	70.8	238	9.9	1	0	167.9	20	127	6.4	3
2022	Kent State	11	11	4−7	157	266	59.0	2,109	7.9	13	5	138.0	98	489	5.0	4
2023	UCLA	7	2	1−1	25	47	53.2	217	4.6	2	2	97.5	42	425	10.1	3
2024	Virginia Tech	8	2	0−2	26	49	53.1	346	7.1	3	1	128.5	38	136	3.6	1
Career		39	15	5−10	232	399	58.1	3,023	7.6	21	8	135.1	210	1,262	3.6	12
