= 2024 Minnesota Golden Gophers football team =

American college football season

2024 Minnesota Golden Gophers football

Duke's Mayo Bowl champion

Duke's Mayo Bowl, W 24–10 vs. Virginia Tech
- Conference: Big Ten Conference
- Record: 8–5 (5–4 Big Ten)
- Head coach: P. J. Fleck (8th season)
- Co-offensive coordinators: Matt Simon (5th season); Greg Harbaugh Jr. (2nd season)
- Offensive scheme: Multiple
- Defensive coordinator: Corey Hetherman (1st season)
- Co-defensive coordinator: Nick Monroe (2nd season)
- Base defense: 4–3
- Home stadium: Huntington Bank Stadium

2024 Big Ten Conference football standings
	Conf.			Overall
Team	W		L	W		L
No. 3 Oregon y$^	9	–	0	13	–	1
No. 10 Indiana ^	8	–	1	11	–	2
No. 5 Penn State y^	8	–	1	13	–	3
No. 1 Ohio State #^	7	–	2	14	–	2
No. 16 Illinois	6	–	3	10	–	3
Iowa	6	–	3	8	–	5
Michigan	5	–	4	8	–	5
Minnesota	5	–	4	8	–	5
USC	4	–	5	7	–	6
Rutgers	4	–	5	7	–	6
Washington	4	–	5	6	–	7
Nebraska	3	–	6	7	–	6
UCLA	3	–	6	5	–	7
Wisconsin	3	–	6	5	–	7
Northwestern	2	–	7	4	–	8
Maryland	1	–	8	4	–	8
Michigan State†	0	–	6	0	–	7
Purdue	0	–	9	1	–	11
Championship: Oregon 45, Penn State 37
# – College Football Playoff champion; ^ – College Football Playoff participant; $ – Conference champion; y – Championship game participant; † — NCAA vacated all wins for Michigan State (5–7, 3–6); Rankings from AP Poll

The 2024 Minnesota Golden Gophers football team represented the University of Minnesota in the Big Ten Conference during the 2024 NCAA Division I FBS football season. The Golden Gophers were led by P. J. Fleck in his eighth year as head coach. They played their home games at the Huntington Bank Stadium in Minneapolis.

== Offseason ==
Positions key
Offense	Defense	Special teams
QB — Quarterback; RB — Running back; FB — Fullback; WR — Wide receiver; TE — Tight end; OL — Offensive lineman; T — Tackle; G — Guard; C — Center	DL — Defensive lineman; DT — Defensive tackle (Note: Includes nose tackle (NT)); DE — Defensive end; EDGE — Edge rusher; LB — Linebacker (Note: Includes middle linebacker (MLB/MIKE), weakside linebacker (WILL), strongside linebacker (SAM), off-ball linebacker, and outside linebacker (OLB)); DB — Defensive back; CB — Cornerback; S — Safety (Note: Includes free safety (FS) and strong safety (SS))	K — Kicker (Note: Also known as a placekicker (PK)); P — Punter; LS — Long snapper; RS — Return specialist (Note: Includes kickoff and punt returners)

=== Acquisitions ===
==== 2024 recruiting class ====
College recruiting
Name	Hometown	School	Height	Weight	Commit date
Koi Perich; S	Esko, Minnesota	Lincoln Secondary School	6 ft 0 in (1.83 m)	199 lb (90 kg)	Apr 19, 2023
Koi Perich; S	Recruit ratings: Rivals: 247Sports: ESPN: (82)				
Nathan Roy; OT	Mukwonago, Wisconsin	Mukwonago High School	6 ft 6 in (1.98 m)	295 lb (134 kg)	Jun 17, 2023
Nathan Roy; OT	Recruit ratings: Rivals: 247Sports: ESPN: (82)				
Riley Sunram; DT	Kindred, North Dakota	Kindred High School	6 ft 4 in (1.93 m)	275 lb (125 kg)	Apr 11, 2023
Riley Sunram; DT	Recruit ratings: Rivals: 247Sports: ESPN: (77)				
Brett Carroll; C	Olathe, Kansas	Olathe East High School	6 ft 3 in (1.91 m)	300 lb (140 kg)	Jul 2, 2023
Brett Carroll; C	Recruit ratings: Rivals: 247Sports: ESPN: (77)				
Fame Ijeboi; RB	Philadelphia, Pennsylvania	William Penn Charter School	6 ft 0 in (1.83 m)	200 lb (91 kg)	Jun 18, 2023
Fame Ijeboi; RB	Recruit ratings: Rivals: 247Sports: ESPN: (78)				
Julian Johnson; TE	Aurora, Illinois	Waubonsie Valley High School	6 ft 6 in (1.98 m)	225 lb (102 kg)	May 9, 2023
Julian Johnson; TE	Recruit ratings: Rivals: 247Sports: ESPN: (77)				
Mike Gerald; ATH	Katy, Texas	Morton Ranch High School	6 ft 0 in (1.83 m)	180 lb (82 kg)	Jun 11, 2023
Mike Gerald; ATH	Recruit ratings: Rivals: 247Sports: ESPN: (77)				
Zahir Rainer; S	Richmond, Virginia	Trinity Episcopal School	5 ft 10 in (1.78 m)	185 lb (84 kg)	Apr 13, 2023
Zahir Rainer; S	Recruit ratings: Rivals: 247Sports: ESPN: (77)				
Jacob Simpson; TE	Johnston, Iowa	Johnston High School	6 ft 5 in (1.96 m)	225 lb (102 kg)	Jun 11, 2023
Jacob Simpson; TE	Recruit ratings: Rivals: 247Sports: ESPN: (77)				
Jalen Smith; WR	Mankato, Minnesota	Mankato West High School	6 ft 0 in (1.83 m)	185 lb (84 kg)	May 12, 2023
Jalen Smith; WR	Recruit ratings: Rivals: 247Sports: ESPN: (77)				
Samuel Madu; CB	White Plains, New York	Archbishop Stepinac High School	6 ft 1 in (1.85 m)	170 lb (77 kg)	Jun 11, 2023
Samuel Madu; CB	Recruit ratings: Rivals: 247Sports: ESPN: (77)				
Drake Lindsey; QB	Fayetteville, Arkansas	Fayetteville High School	6 ft 5 in (1.96 m)	235 lb (107 kg)	May 12, 2023
Drake Lindsey; QB	Recruit ratings: Rivals: 247Sports: ESPN: (76)				
Mason Carrier; LB	Detroit Lakes, Minnesota	Detroit Lakes High School	6 ft 2 in (1.88 m)	225 lb (102 kg)	Jun 19, 2022
Mason Carrier; LB	Recruit ratings: Rivals: 247Sports: ESPN: (76)				
Simon Siedl; ATH	Saint Paul, Minnesota	Hill-Murray School	5 ft 11 in (1.80 m)	179 lb (81 kg)	Mar 5, 2023
Simon Siedl; ATH	Recruit ratings: Rivals: 247Sports: ESPN: (76)				
Mo Saine; DT	Eden Prairie, Minnesota	Eden Prairie High School	6 ft 4 in (1.93 m)	260 lb (120 kg)	Apr 12, 2023
Mo Saine; DT	Recruit ratings: Rivals: 247Sports: ESPN: (76)				
Jaylin Hicks; DT	New Rochelle, New York	Iona Preparatory School	6 ft 3 in (1.91 m)	250 lb (110 kg)	Jun 11, 2023
Jaylin Hicks; DT	Recruit ratings: Rivals: 247Sports: ESPN: (76)				
Dallas Sims (Note: He enrolled at Minnesota, but entered the transfer portal prior to 2024 season and committed to Old Dominion.); WR	Clearwater, Florida	Clearwater Academy International	6 ft 2 in (1.88 m)	205 lb (93 kg)	Mar 25, 2023
Dallas Sims; WR	Recruit ratings: Rivals: 247Sports: ESPN: (75)				
Jaydon Wright; RB	Kankakee, Illinois	Bishop McNamara High School	5 ft 11 in (1.80 m)	225 lb (102 kg)	Feb 26, 2023
Jaydon Wright; RB	Recruit ratings: Rivals: 247Sports: ESPN: (75)				
Sam Macy; LB	Chanhassen, Minnesota	Chanhassen High School	6 ft 5 in (1.96 m)	225 lb (102 kg)	Jun 5, 2023
Sam Macy; LB	Recruit ratings: Rivals: 247Sports: ESPN: (74)				
Alan Soukup; C / LS	Phoenix, Arizona	Pinnacle High School	6 ft 1 in (1.85 m)	195 lb (88 kg)	Jan 28, 2024
Alan Soukup; C / LS	Recruit ratings: Rivals: 247Sports: ESPN: (69)				
David Amaliri; LB	Clearwater, Florida	Clearwater Academy International	6 ft 3 in (1.91 m)	200 lb (91 kg)	Jun 16, 2024
David Amaliri; LB	Recruit ratings: Rivals: 247Sports:				
Overall recruit ranking: Rivals: 41 247Sports: 33
Note: In many cases, Scout, Rivals, 247Sports, On3, and ESPN may conflict in their listings of height and weight.; In these cases, the average was taken. ESPN grades are on a 100-point scale.; Sources: "Rivals commits". Rivals.; "ESPN commits". ESPN.; "2024 Team Ranking". Rivals.com.; "247Sports commits". 247Sports.

==== Incoming transfers ====
2024 Minnesota Golden Gophers incoming transfers
Name	No.	Pos.	Height	Weight	Year	Hometown	Prev. school	Ref.
Max Brosmer	#16	QB	6'2	210	Graduate student	Roswell, GA	New Hampshire	
Dylan Wittke	#14	QB	6'1	200	(redshirt) Freshman	Buford, GA	Virginia Tech	
Marcus Major	#24	RB	6'0	225	(redshirt) Graduate student	Oklahoma City	Oklahoma	
Sieh Bangura	#2	RB	6'0	200	(redshirt) Junior	Washington, D.C.	Ohio	
Jaren Mangham	#8	RB	6'2	240	(redshirt) Graduate student	Detroit	Michigan State	
Tyler Williams	#7	WR	6'3	210	(redshirt) Freshman	Waverly, FL	Georgia	
Cristian Driver	#4	WR	6'0	190	(redshirt) Sophomore	Flower Mound, TX	Penn State	
Jaylen Varner (Note: Varner enrolled at Minnesota, but re-entered the transfer portal prior to the 2024 season.)	–	WR	6'1	179	Graduate student	Marshall, MO	Emporia State	
Aluma Nkele	#70	OT	6'7	360	(redshirt) Junior	Gardena, CA	UTEP	
Jaxon Howard	#1	DE	6'4	250	(redshirt) Freshman	Crystal, MN	LSU	
Adam Kissayi (Note: Kissayi enrolled early at Clemson and transferred to Minnesota prior to the 2024 season.)	#98	DE	6'8	235	Freshman	Palm Bay, FL	Clemson	
Jai'Onte' McMillan	#24	CB	5'10	195	(redshirt) Senior	Atlanta	TCU	
Ethan Robinson	#2	CB	6'0	180	Senior	Montgomery, NY	Bucknell	
Sam Henson	#30	K	6'2	185	Graduate student	Owatonna, MN	Concordia–St. Paul	

=== Departures ===
==== 2024 NFL draft ====
Name	Pos.	Round	Pick	Team
Tyler Nubin	S	2	47	New York Giants

==== Outgoing transfers ====
2024 Minnesota Golden Gophers outgoing transfers
Name	No.	Pos.	Height	Weight	Year	Hometown	New school	Ref.
Athan Kaliakmanis	#8	QB	6'4	215	Senior	Antioch, IL	Rutgers	
Drew Viotto	#18	QB	6'4	235	Sophomore	Sault Ste. Marie, ON	Eastern Michigan	
Zach Evans	#26	RB	5'9	207	Sophomore	Rockwall, TX	North Texas	
Max Grand	#33	RB	5'9	205	(redshirt) Sophomore	Ellsworth, WI	Augustana (SD)	
Marquese Williams	–	RB	5'9	175	(redshirt) Freshman	Harrisburg, PA	Akron	
Zach Jorgensen	#28	WR	6'2	200	(redshirt) Freshman	Fairmont, MN	Northern State	
Dino Kaliakmanis	#80	WR	6'2	205	Senior	Antioch, IL	Rutgers	
Cade Osterman	#20	WR	6'1	185	Sophomore	Elk River, MN	North Dakota State	
Dallas Sims	#12	WR	6'2	205	Freshman	Clearwater, FL	Old Dominion	
Jaylen Varner	–	WR	6'1	179	Graduate student	Marshall, MO		
J. J. Guedet	#50	OT	6'8	315	Senior	Washington, IL	Illinois State	
De'Eric Mister	#67	OT	6'6	300	Sophomore	Gary, IN	Howard	
Logan Purcell	#79	OT	6'7	300	(redshirt) Junior	Annandale, MN		
Tyrell Lawrence	#73	G	6'7	355	(redshirt) Junior	Milton, ON	Alabama A&M	
Cade McConnell	#70	G	6'5	300	(redshirt) Sophomore	Choctaw, OK	Vanderbilt	
Trey Bixby (Note: He medically retired after redshirting in the 2022 season, his freshman year, and was not a member of the 2023 roster.)	#98	DE	6'4	250	(redshirt) Sophomore	Eden Prairie, MN	Minnesota Duluth	
Colton Gregersen	#28	DE	6'2	250	(redshirt) Sophomore	Burnsville, MN		
Tyler Bride	#3	CB	5'10	185	Graduate student	Norcross, GA	Jacksonville State	
Victor Pless	#26	CB	5'10	175	(redshirt) Senior	Kennesaw, GA	Mercer	
Tariq Watson	#24	CB	5'10	185	(redshirt) Sophomore	Gretna, LA	UAB	
Jacob Lewis	#48	K	6'2	207	Graduate student	Delaware, OH	Ohio	

Note: The year (class) is the one they will have with their new team.

==== Team departures ====
2024 Minnesota Golden Gophers departures
Name	No.	Pos.	Height	Weight	Year	Hometown	Reason
Tre'Von Jones	#2	DB	6'0	180	Graduate student	Warrenton, NC	Graduated
Sean Tyler	#2	RB	5'9	190	Graduate student	Richton Park, IL	Graduated
Corey Crooms Jr.	#4	WR	6'1	195	Graduate student	Country Club Hills, IL	Graduated
Chris Autman-Bell	#7	WR	6'1	205	(redshirt) Graduate student	Kankakee, IL	Graduated
Cole Kramer	#12	QB	6'1	205	(redshirt) Senior	Eden Prairie, MN	Graduated
Chris Collins	#13	DL	6'5	255	(redshirt) Graduate student	Richmond, VA	Graduated
Rowan Zolman	#15	LB	6'4	225	Sophomore	Churubusco, IN	Not rostered (Note: He does not appear in the official roster anymore.)
Bryce Williams	#21	WR	6'0	210	(redshirt) Graduate student	Minneapolis, MN	Graduated
Ryan Selig	#33	LB	6'3	235	(redshirt) Graduate student	Lake Villa, IL	Graduated
Ryan Shamburger	#36	P	6'2	195	(redshirt) Junior	McKinney, TX	Not rostered
Brady Weeks	#37	LS	6'0	225	Graduate student	O'Fallon, MO	Graduated
Cade Larson	#41	LB	6'1	225	(redshirt) Freshman	Harrisburg, SD	Not rostered
Karter Shaw	#55	OL	6'4	305	(redshirt) Graduate student	South Jordan, UT	Graduated
Nathan Boe	#66	OL	6'5	300	(redshirt) Graduate student	Lakeville, MN	Graduated
Jackson Ruschmeyer	#68	OL	6'4	300	(redshirt) Junior	Hutchinson, MN	Not rostered
Wyatt Schroeder	#82	TE	6'5	255	(redshirt) Senior	St. Francis, MN	Graduated
Brevyn Spann-Ford	#88	TE	6'7	270	(redshirt) Graduate student	St. Cloud, MN	Graduated
Kyler Baugh	#93	DL	6'2	305	Graduate student	Talihina, OK	Graduated

== Schedule ==
Date	Time	Opponent	Site	TV	Result	Attendance
August 29	8:00 p.m.	North Carolina*	Huntington Bank Stadium; Minneapolis, MN	FOX	L 17–19	50,805
September 7	11:00 a.m.	Rhode Island*	Huntington Bank Stadium; Minneapolis, MN	Peacock	W 48–0	41,006
September 14	2:30 p.m.	Nevada*	Huntington Bank Stadium; Minneapolis, MN	BTN	W 27–0	44,534
September 21	6:30 p.m.	Iowa	Huntington Bank Stadium; Minneapolis, MN (rivalry)	NBC	L 14–31	52,048
September 28	11:00 a.m.	at No. 12 Michigan	Michigan Stadium; Ann Arbor, MI (Little Brown Jug)	FOX	L 24–27	110,340
October 5	6:30 p.m.	No. 11 USC	Huntington Bank Stadium; Minneapolis, MN	BTN	W 24–17	50,913
October 12	8:00 p.m.	at UCLA	Rose Bowl; Pasadena, CA	BTN	W 21–17	42,012
October 26	2:30 p.m.	Maryland^{†}	Huntington Bank Stadium; Minneapolis, MN	FS1	W 48–23	48,696
November 2	11:00 a.m.	at No. 24 Illinois	Memorial Stadium; Champaign, IL	FS1	W 25–17	58,088
November 9	11:00 a.m.	at Rutgers	SHI Stadium; Piscataway, NJ	NBC	L 19–26	44,120
November 23	2:30 p.m.	No. 4 Penn State	Huntington Bank Stadium; Minneapolis, MN (Governor's Victory Bell)	CBS	L 25–26	44,266
November 29	11:00 a.m.	at Wisconsin	Camp Randall Stadium; Madison, WI (rivalry)	CBS	W 24–7	76,059
January 3, 2025	6:30 p.m.	vs. Virginia Tech	Bank of America Stadium; Charlotte, NC (Duke's Mayo Bowl)	ESPN	W 24–10	31,927
*Non-conference game; ^{†}Homecoming; Rankings from AP Poll (and CFP Rankings, after November 5) - Released prior to game; All times are in Central time; Source:

== Game summaries ==
=== vs. North Carolina ===
Game One – North Carolina Tar Heels (0–0) vs Minnesota Golden Gophers (0–0) – Game summary

Quarter	1	2	3	4	Total
Tar Heels	0	7	6	6	19
Golden Gophers	0	14	0	3	17

at Huntington Bank Stadium • Minneapolis, Minnesota

- Date: August 29
- Game time: 8:00 p.m.
- Game weather: Cloudy • Temperature: 75 °F (24 °C) • Wind: SW at 7 miles per hour (11 km/h)
- Game attendance: 50,805
- Referee: Kole Knueppel
- TV announcers (FOX): Jason Benetti (play-by-play), Brock Huard (analyst), and Allison Williams (sideline)

Game information

First quarter

- no scoring

Second quarter

- (11:12) UNC – Max Johnson 3-yard run (Noah Burnette kick) (Drive: 9 plays, 80 yards, 4:19; North Carolina 7–0)
- (7:35) MINN – Marcus Major 5-yard run (Dragan Kesich kick) (Drive: 2 plays, 6 yards, 0:45; Tied 7–7)
- (0:55) MINN – Max Brosmer 1-yard run (Dragan Kesich kick) (Drive: 9 plays, 65 yards, 5:04; Minnesota 14–7)

Third quarter

- (6:34) UNC – Noah Burnette 29-yard field goal (Drive: 17 plays, 70 yards, 8:21; Minnesota 14–10)
- (0:19) UNC – Noah Burnette 52-yard field goal (Drive: 12 plays, 49 yards, 5:13; Minnesota 14–13)

Fourth quarter

- (9:05) UNC – Noah Burnette 42-yard field goal (Drive: 4 plays, -2 yards, 2:28; North Carolina 16–14)
- (3:40) MINN – Dragan Kesich 30-yard field goal (Drive: 10 plays, 63 yards, 5:25; Minnesota 17–16)
- (1:44) UNC – Noah Burnette 45-yard field goal (Drive: 6 plays, 48 yards, 1:56; North Carolina 19–17)

Statistics	UNC	MINN
First downs	18	14
Total yards	64–252	54–244
Rushing yards	41–147	33–78
Passing yards	105	166
Passing: Comp–Att–Int	14–23–1	13–21–0
Time of possession	30:31	29:29

Team	Category	Player	Statistics
North Carolina	Passing	Max Johnson	12/19, 71 yards, INT
North Carolina	Rushing	Omarion Hampton	30 carries, 129 yards
North Carolina	Receiving	JJ Jones	3 receptions, 52 yards
Minnesota	Passing	Max Brosmer	13/21, 166 yards
Minnesota	Rushing	Marcus Major	20 carries, 73 yards, TD
Minnesota	Receiving	Daniel Jackson	4 receptions, 55 yards

=== vs. Rhode Island (FCS) ===
Game Two – Rhode Island Rams (FCS) (1–0) at Minnesota Golden Gophers (0–1) – Game summary

Quarter	1	2	3	4	Total
Rams (FCS)	0	0	0	0	0
Golden Gophers	3	14	14	17	48

at Huntington Bank Stadium • Minneapolis, MN

- Date: Saturday September 7, 2024
- Game time: 11:00 AM
- Game weather: Sunny • Temperature: 59 °F (15 °C) • Wind S 4 mph
- Game attendance: 41,006
- Referee: Mark Kluczynski
- TV announcers (Peacock): Brendan Burke (play-by-play), Kyle Rudolph (analyst), and Caroline Pineda (sideline)

Game information

First quarter

- (9:27) MINN – Dragan Kesich 53-yard field goal (Drive: 7 plays, 44 yards, 3:26; Minnesota 3–0)

Second quarter

- (11:05) MINN – Darius Taylor 1-yard run (Dragan Kesich kick) (Drive: 13 plays, 83 yards, 6:33; Minnesota 10–0)
- (1:16) MINN – Marcus Major 2-yard run (Dragan Kesich kick) (Drive: 14 plays, 85 yards, 7:57; Minnesota 17–0)

Third quarter

- (7:57) MINN – Cristian Driver 6-yard pass from Max Brosmer (Dragan Kesich kick) (Drive: 12 plays, 73 yards, 6:58; Minnesota 24–0)
- (1:11) MINN – Le'Meke Brockington 29-yard pass from Max Brosmer (Drive: 8 plays, 79 yards, 4:40; Minnesota 31–0)

Fourth quarter

- (11:04) MINN – Dragan Kesich 47-yard field goal (Dragan Kesich kick) (Drive: 7 plays, 19 yards, 3:46; Minnesota 34–0)
- (10:32) MINN – Jack Henderson 25-yard interception return (Dragan Kesich kick (Drive: 3 plays, -8 yards, 0:32; Minnesota 41–0)
- (1:56) MINN – Tyler Williams 8-yard pass from Drake Lindsey (Dragan Kesich kick) (Drive: 7 plays, 55 yards, 4:12; Minnesota 48–0)

Statistics	URI	MINN
First downs	6	27
Total yards	135	422
Rushing yards	18	116
Passing yards	117	306
Passing: Comp–Att–Int	13–30–3	27–34–0
Time of possession	19:28	40:32

Team	Category	Player	Statistics
Rhode Island	Passing	Devin Farrell	6/18, 76 yards, 2 INT
Rhode Island	Rushing	Devin Farrell	4 carries, 9 yards
Rhode Island	Receiving	Marquis Buchanan	5 receptions, 64 yards
Minnesota	Passing	Max Brosmer	24/30, 271 yards, 2 TD
Minnesota	Rushing	Darius Taylor	14 carries, 64 yards, TD
Minnesota	Receiving	Elijah Spencer	4 receptions, 55 yards

=== vs. Nevada ===
Game Three – Nevada Wolf Pack (1–2) at Minnesota Golden Gophers (1–1) – Game summary

Quarter	1	2	3	4	Total
Wolf Pack	0	0	0	0	0
Golden Gophers	6	14	7	0	27

at Huntington Bank Stadium • Minneapolis, MN

- Date: Saturday September 14, 2024
- Game time: 2:30 p.m.
- Game weather: Cloudy • Temperature: 72 °F (22 °C) • Wind: S at 10 miles per hour (16 km/h)
- Game attendance: 50,805
- Referee: Tim O'Dey
- TV announcers (BTN): Lisa Byington (play-by-play), Brock Vereen (analyst), and Melanie Ricks (sideline)

Game information

First quarter

- (10:31) MIN – Dragan Kesich 52-yard field goal (Drive: 8 plays, 52 yards, 4:25; Minnesota 3–0)
- (1:47) MIN - Dragan Kesich 21-yard field goal (Drive: 6 plays, 52 yards, 2:56; Minnesota 6–0)

Second quarter

- (4:03) MIN - Darius Taylor 10 yd pass from Brosmer, Max, Dragan Kesich kick (Drive: 2 plays, 16 yards, 0:39; Minnesota 13–0)
- (0:32) MIN - Darius Taylor 4 yd run, Dragan Kesich kick (Drive: 7 plays, 69 yards, 1:23; Minnesota 20–0)

Third quarter

- (8:58) MIN - Darius Taylor 80 yd run, Dragan Kesich kick (Drive: 3 plays, 90 yards, 0:48; Minnesota 27–0)

Fourth quarter

No scoring plays

Statistics	NEV	MINN
First downs	10	20
Total yards	172	386
Rushing yards	58	195
Passing yards	114	191
Passing: Comp–Att–Int	15–22–3	16–26–1
Time of possession	30:47	29:13

Team	Category	Player	Statistics
Nevada	Passing	Brendon Lewis	15/22, 114 yards, 3 INT
Nevada	Rushing	Patrick Garwo III	7 carries, 23 yards
Nevada	Receiving	Jaden Smith	1 reception, 25 yards
Minnesota	Passing	Max Brosmer	16/26, 191 yards, TD, INT
Minnesota	Rushing	Darius Taylor	11 carries, 124 yards, 2 TD
Minnesota	Receiving	Daniel Jackson	4 receptions, 61 yards

=== vs Iowa (rivalry) ===
Iowa Hawkeyes (2–1) vs Minnesota Golden Gophers (2–1) – Game summary

Quarter	1	2	3	4	Total
Hawkeyes	7	0	17	7	31
Golden Gophers	0	14	0	0	14

at Huntington Bank Stadium • Minneapolis, Minnesota

- Date: September 21
- Game time: 6:30 p.m.
- Game weather: 76 °F (24 °C), Sunny, Wind NW 10 mph (16 km/h)
- Game attendance: 52,048
- Referee: Kole Knueppel
- TV announcers (NBC): Noah Eagle (play-by-play), Todd Blackledge (analyst), and Kathryn Tappen (sideline)

Game information

First quarter

- 8:03 Iowa – Kaleb Johnson 1-yard run (Drew Stevens kick) (Drive: 5 plays, 38 yards, 2:05; Iowa 7–0)

Second quarter

- 4:20 Minnesota – Jameson Geers 3-yard pass from Max Brosmer (Dragan Kesich kick) (Drive: 7 plays, 64 yards, 4:32; Tied 7–7)
- 0:21 Minnesota – Elijah Spencer 11-yard pass from Max Brosmer (Dragan Kesich kick) (Drive: 8 plays, 68 yards, 2:24; Minnesota 14–7)

Third quarter

- 12:56 Iowa – Kaleb Johnson 15-yard run (Drew Stevens kick) (Drive: 5 plays, 67 yards, 1:59; Tied 14–14)
- 5:43 Iowa – Kaleb Johnson 40-yard run (Drew Stevens kick) (Drive: 6 plays, 73 yards, 2:58; Iowa 21–14)
- 0:43 Iowa – Drew Stevens 46-yard field goal (Drive: 9 plays, 34 yards, 3:59; Iowa 24–14)

Fourth quarter

- 11:13 Iowa – Brendan Sullivan 1-yard run (Drew Stevens kick) (Drive: 6 plays, 52 yards, 3:40; Iowa 31–14)

Statistics	IOWA	MINN
First downs	19	15
Total yards	64–334	58–288
Rushing yards	45–272	21–79
Passing yards	62	209
Passing: Comp–Att–Int	11–19–0	22–37–2
Time of possession	31:43	28:17

Team	Category	Player	Statistics
Iowa	Passing	Cade McNamara	11/19, 62 yards
Iowa	Rushing	Kaleb Johnson	21 carries, 206 yards, 3 TD
Iowa	Receiving	Addison Ostrenga	2 receptions, 20 yards
Minnesota	Passing	Max Brosmer	22/37, 209 yards, 2 TD, 2 INT
Minnesota	Rushing	Darius Taylor	10 carries, 34 yards
Minnesota	Receiving	Daniel Jackson	9 receptions, 112 yards

=== at No. 12 Michigan (Little Brown Jug) ===
Minnesota Golden Gophers (2–2) at No. 12 Michigan Wolverines (3–1) – Game summary

Quarter	1	2	3	4	Total
Golden Gophers	0	3	0	21	24
No. 12 Wolverines	7	14	3	3	27

at Michigan Stadium • Ann Arbor, Michigan

- Date: September 28
- Game time: 11:00 a.m.
- Game weather: 67 °F (19 °C), rain, NE 8 miles per hour (13 km/h)
- Game attendance: 110,340
- Referee: Mark Kluczynski
- TV announcers (FOX): Gus Johnson (play-by-play), Joel Klatt (analyst), and Jenny Taft (sideline)

Game information

First quarter

- (6:34) Michigan – Kalel Mullings 27-yard run (Dominic Zvada kick) (Drive: 9 plays, 79 yards, 4:57; Michigan 7–0)

Second quarter

- (8:59) Michigan – Kalel Mullings 1-yard run (Dominic Zvada kick) (Drive: 3 plays, 16 yards, 1:26; Michigan 14–0)
- (3:48) Michigan – Tyler Morris 11-yard pass from Alex Orji (Dominic Zvada kick) (Drive: 1 play, 11 yards, 0:29; Michigan 21–0)
- (0:00) Minnesota – Dragan Kesich 20-yard field gold (Drive: 10 plays, 77 yards, 1:54; Michigan 21–3)

Third quarter

- (7:36) Michigan – Dominic Zvada 53-yard field gold (Drive: 13 plays, 40 yards, 7:24; Michigan 24–3)

Fourth quarter

- (14:01) Minnesota – Darius Taylor 3-yard run (Dragan Kesich kick) (Drive: 12 plays, 76 yards, 4:59; Michigan 24–10)
- (11:05) Minnesota – Darius Taylor 4-yard run (Dragan Kesich kick) (Drive: 3 plays, 17 yards, 0:47; Michigan 24–17)
- (4:33) Michigan – Dominic Zvada 35-yard field gold (Drive: 14 plays, 58 yards, 6:32; Michigan 27–17)
- (1:37) Minnesota – Daniel Jackson 12-yard pass from Max Brosmer (Dragan Kesich kick) (Drive: 14 plays, 75 yards, 2:56; Michigan 27–24)

Statistics	MINN	MICH
First downs	20	15
Total yards	66–296	61–241
Rushing yards	25–38	43–155
Passing yards	258	86
Passing: Comp–Att–Int	27–41–1	10–18–1
Time of possession	26:44	33:16

Team	Category	Player	Statistics
Minneosta	Passing	Max Brosmer	27/40, 258 yards, 1 TD, 1 INT
Minneosta	Rushing	Darius Taylor	13 carries, 36 yards, 2 TD
Minneosta	Receiving	Elijah Spencer	6 receptions, 67 yards
Michigan	Passing	Alex Orji	10/18, 86 yards, 1 TD, 1 INT
Michigan	Rushing	Kalel Mullings	24 carries, 111 yards, 2 TD
Michigan	Receiving	Colston Loveland	4 receptions, 41 yards

=== vs No. 11 USC ===
No. 11 USC Trojans (3–1) vs Minnesota Golden Gophers (2–3) – Game summary

Quarter	1	2	3	4	Total
No. 11 Trojans	0	10	7	0	17
Golden Gophers	3	7	0	14	24

at Huntington Bank Stadium • Minneapolis, Minnesota

- Date: October 5
- Game time: 6:30 p.m.
- Game weather: Sunny, 71 °F (22 °C)
- Game attendance: 50,913
- Referee: Ron Snodgrass
- TV announcers (BTN): Guy Haberman (play-by-play), Yogi Roth (analyst), and Rhett Lewis (sideline)

Game information

First quarter

- (0:05) MINN - Dragan Kesich 32-yard field goal, (Drive: 9 plays, 49 yards, 5:19; Minnesota 3–0)

Second quarter

- (7:13) USC - Duce Robinson 3-yard pass from Miller Moss (Michael Lantz kick) (Drive: 15 plays, 75 yards, 7:52; USC 7–3)
- (4:05) MINN - Max Brosmer 1-yard rush (Dragan Kesich kick) (Drive: 7 plays, 75 yards, 3:08; Minnesota 10–7)
- (0:00) USC - Michael Lantz 54-yard field goal (Drive: 4 plays, 16 yards, 0:27; Tied 10–10)

Third quarter

- (5:47) USC - Woody Marks 1-yard rush (Michael Lantz kick) (Drive: 12 plays, 91 yards, 7:03; USC 17–10)

Fourth quarter

- (7:08) MINN - Max Brosmer 5-yard rush (Dragan Kesich kick) (Drive: 6 plays, 65 yards, 3:03; Tied 17–17)
- (0:56) MINN - Max Brosmer 1-yard rush (Dragan Kesich kick) (Drive: 12 plays, 75 yards, 5:13; Minnesota 24–17)

Statistics	USC	MINN
First downs	22	20
Total yards	66–373	59–362
Rushing yards	28–173	40–193
Passing yards	200	169
Passing: Comp–Att–Int	22–38–2	15–19–0
Time of possession	31:48	31:00

Team	Category	Player	Statistics
USC	Passing	Miller Moss	23/38, 200 yards, TD, 2 INT
USC	Rushing	Woody Marks	20 carries, 134 yards, TD
USC	Receiving	Kyron Hudson	5 receptions, 54 yards
Minnesota	Passing	Max Brosmer	15/19, 169 yards
Minnesota	Rushing	Darius Taylor	25 carries, 144 yards
Minnesota	Receiving	Darius Taylor	5 receptions, 56 yards

=== at UCLA ===
Minnesota Golden Gophers (3–3) at UCLA Bruins (1–4) – Game summary

Quarter	1	2	3	4	Total
Golden Gophers	0	0	14	7	21
Bruins	7	3	0	7	17

at Rose Bowl • Pasadena, California

- Date: October 12
- Game time: 8:00 p.m.
- Game weather: Sunny
- Game attendance: 42,012
- Referee: Jeffrey Servinski
- TV announcers (BTN): Guy Haberman (play-by-play), Yogi Roth (analyst), and Rhett Lewis (sideline)

Game information

First quarter

- (8:49) UCLA - Keegan Jones 1-yard rush (Mateen Bhaghani kick) (Drive: 10 plays, 59 yards, 5:14; UCLA 7–0)

Second quarter

- (0:00) UCLA - Mateen Bhaghani 34-yard field goal (Drive: 6 plays, 47 yards, 0:46; UCLA 10–0)

Third quarter

- (10:33) MINN - Elijah Spencer 12-yard pass from Max Brosmer (Dragan Kesich kick) (Drive: 5 plays, 46 yards, 2:41; UCLA 10–7)
- (7:16) MINN - Darius Taylor 2-yard rush (Dragan Kesich kick) (Drive: 6 plays, 38 yards, 2:29; Minnesota 14–10)

Fourth quarter

- (6:54) UCLA - J. Michael Sturdivant 42-yard pass from Ethan Garbers (Mateen Bhaghani kick) (Drive: 9 plays, 89 yards, 5:44; UCLA 17–14)
- (0:27) MINN - Darius Taylor 4-yard pass from Max Brosmer (Dragan Kesich kick) (Drive: 7 plays, 61 yards, 1:53; Minnesota 21–17)

Statistics	MINN	UCLA
First downs	19	18
Total yards	234	329
Rushing yards	41	36
Passing yards	193	293
Passing: Comp–Att–Int	26-37-0	25-36-3
Time of possession	30:58	29:02

Team	Category	Player	Statistics
Minneosta	Passing	Max Brosmer	26/37, 193 yards, 2 TD
Minneosta	Rushing	Darius Taylor	16 carries, 30 yards, TD
Minneosta	Receiving	Daniel Jackson	10 receptions, 89 yards
UCLA	Passing	Ethan Garbers	25/36, 293 yards, TD, 3 INT
UCLA	Rushing	Jalen Berger	8 carries, 20 yards
UCLA	Receiving	J. Michael Sturdivant	7 receptions, 107 yards, TD

=== vs Maryland ===
Maryland Terrapins (4–3) vs Minnesota Golden Gophers (4–3) – Game summary

Quarter	1	2	3	4	Total
Terrapins	0	10	0	13	23
Golden Gophers	21	13	7	7	48

at Huntington Bank Stadium • Minneapolis, Minnesota

- Date: October 26
- Game time: 2:30 p.m.
- Game weather: 57 °F (14 °C), sunny
- Game attendance: 48,696
- Referee: Jerry McGinn
- TV announcers (FS1): Connor Onion (play-by-play) and Spencer Tillman (analyst)
- GopherSports.com box score

Game information

First quarter

- (10:45) MINN - Daniel Jackson 10-yard pass from Max Brosmer (Dragan Kesich kick) (Drive: 5 plays, 58 yards, 2:30; Minnesota 7–0)
- (5:04) MINN - Elijah Spencer 7-yard pass from Max Brosmer (Dragan Kesich kick) (Drive: 9 plays, 65 yards, 3:54; Minnesota 14–0)
- (4:31) MINN - Justin Walley 29-yard interception return (Dragan Kesich kick) (Drive: 3 plays, 4 yards, 0:39; Minnesota 21–0)

Second quarter

- (14:55) MINN - Dragan Kesich 40-yard field goal (Drive: 4 plays, 1 yard, 1:08; Minnesota 24–0)
- (6:55) MD - Jack Howes 33-yard field goal (Drive: 10 plays, 56 yards, 4:07; Minnesota 24–3)
- (2:17) MINN - Daniel Jackson 4-yard pass from Max Brosmer (Dragan Kesich kick) (Drive: 8 plays, 75 yards, 4:38; Minnesota 31–3)
- (0:28) MD - Billy Edwards Jr. 3-yard rush (Jack Howes kick) (Drive: 12 plays, 75 yards, 1:49; Minnesota 31–10)
- (0:02) MINN - Dragan Kesich 34-yard field goal (Drive: 6 plays, 49 yards, 0:26; Minnesota 34–10)

Third quarter

- (13:00) MINN - Elijah Spencer 25-yard pass from Max Brosmer (Dragan Kesich kick) (Drive: 5 plays, 75 yards, 1:53; Minnesota 41–10)

Fourth quarter

- (14:49) MINN - Darius Taylor 51-yard rush (Dragan Kesich kick) (Drive: 6 plays, 87 yards, 3:50; Minnesota 48–10)
- (11:51) MD - DJ Samuels 2-yard pass from MJ Morris (2-point conversion failed) (Drive: 6 plays, 75 yards, 2:58; Minnesota 48–16)
- (2:13) MD - Shaleak Knotts 21-yard pass from MJ Morris (Jack Howes kick) (Drive: 7 plays, 88 yards, 3:04; Minnesota 48–23)

Statistics	MD	MINN
First downs	21	26
Total yards	427	443
Rushing yards	104	123
Passing yards	323	320
Passing: Comp–Att–Int	26-43-2	26-34-0
Time of possession	27:36	32:24

Team	Category	Player	Statistics
Maryland	Passing	Billy Edwards Jr.	19/35, 201 yards, 2 INT
Maryland	Rushing	Roman Hemby	8 carries, 31 yards
Maryland	Receiving	Tai Felton	9 receptions, 104 yards
Minnesota	Passing	Max Brosmer	26/33, 320 yards, 4 TD
Minnesota	Rushing	Darius Taylor	15 carries, 81 yards, TD
Minnesota	Receiving	Daniel Jackson	9 receptions, 117 yards, 2 TD

=== at No. 24 Illinois ===
Minnesota Golden Gophers (5–3) at No. 24 Illinois Fighting Illini (6–2) – Game summary

Quarter	1	2	3	4	Total
Golden Gophers	3	10	3	9	25
No. 24 Fighting Illini	0	10	0	7	17

at Memorial Stadium • Champaign, Illinois

- Date: November 2
- Game time: 11:00 a.m.
- Game weather: • Sunny Temperature: 52 °F (11 °C) • Wind: 9 mph
- Game attendance: 58,088
- Referee: Larry Smith
- TV announcers (FS1): Tim Brando (play-by-play), Devin Gardner (analyst), and Josh Sims (sideline)

Game information

First quarter

- (6:21) MINN - Dragan Kesich 20-yard field goal (Drive: 11 plays, 42 yards, 4:48; Minnesota 3–0)

Second quarter

- (10:08) ILL - David Olano 25-yard field goal (Drive: 11 plays, 65 yards, 6:26; Tied 3–3)
- (6:55) MINN - Darius Taylor 29-yard rush (Dragan Kesich kick) (Drive: 8 plays, 65 yards, 3:13; Minnesota 10–3)
- (3:28) ILL - Josh McCray 42-yard rush (David Olano kick) (Drive: 7 plays, 75 yards, 3:26; Tied 10–10)
- (0:19) MINN - Dragan Kesich 45-yard field goal (Drive: 8 plays, 48 yards, 3:09; Minnesota 13–10)

Third quarter

- (4:36) MINN - Dragan Kesich 38-yard field goal (Drive: 12 plays, 44 yards, 6:33; Minnesota 16–10)

Fourth quarter

- (9:03) ILL - Zakhari Franklin 21-yard pass from Luke Altmyer (David Olano kick) (Drive: 5 plays, 54 yards, 2:08; Illinois 17–16)
- (5:14) MINN - Jameson Geers 1-yard pass from Max Brosmer (2-point conversion failed) (Drive: 7 plays, 75 yards, 3:49; Minnesota 22–17)
- (1:52) MINN - Dragan Kesich 46-yard field goal (Drive: 4 plays, 3 yards, 1:25; Minnesota 25–17)

Statistics	MINN	ILL
First downs	21	20
Total yards	361	352
Rushing yards	148	126
Passing yards	213	226
Passing: Comp–Att–Int	22-37-0	20-33-0
Time of possession	34:59	25:01

Team	Category	Player	Statistics
Minneosta	Passing	Max Brosmer	22/37, 213 yards, TD
Minneosta	Rushing	Darius Taylor	22 carries, 131 yards, TD
Minneosta	Receiving	Daniel Jackson	5 receptions, 74 yards
Illinois	Passing	Luke Altmyer	20/33, 226 yards, TD
Illinois	Rushing	Josh McCray	7 carries, 72 yards, TD
Illinois	Receiving	Pat Bryant	5 receptions, 72 yards

=== at Rutgers ===
Minnesota Golden Gophers (6–3) at Rutgers Scarlet Knights (4–4) – Game summary

Quarter	1	2	3	4	Total
Golden Gophers	9	0	7	3	19
Scarlet Knights	7	7	0	12	26

at SHI Stadium • Piscataway, New Jersey

- Date: November 9
- Game time: 11:00 a.m.
- Game weather: Sunny
- Game attendance: 44,120
- Referee: Jerry McGinn
- TV announcers (NBC): Jac Collinsworth (play-by-play), Michael Robinson (analyst), and Caroline Pineda (sideline)

Game information

First quarter

- (7:56) MINN - Darius Taylor 18-yard rush (PAT failed) (Drive: 7 plays, 65 yards, 3:03; Minnesota 6–0)
- (3:31) RUTG - Dymere Miller 1-yard pass from Athan Kaliakmanis (Jai Patel kick) (Drive: 9 plays, 75 yards, 4:25; Rutgers 7–6)
- (0:00) MINN - Dragan Kesich 51-yard field goal (Drive: 7 plays, 39 yards, 3:26; Minnesota 9–7)

Second quarter

- (9:54) RUTG - Dymere Miller 17-yard pass from Athan Kaliakmanis (Jai Patel kick) (Drive: 10 plays, 75 yards, 5:06; Rutgers 14–9)

Third quarter

- (9:01) MINN - Marcus Major 17-yard pass from Max Brosmer (Dragan Kesich kick) (Drive: 10 plays, 78 yards, 5:54; Minnesota 16–14)

Fourth quarter

- (7:41) RUTG - Ian Strong 4-yard pass from Athan Kaliakmanis (Jai Patel kick) (Drive: 2 plays, 12 yards, 0:47; Rutgers 21–16)
- (6:51) RUTG - Max Brosmer sacked by Jordan Walker for a safety (Drive: 3 plays, -13 yards, 0:46; Rutgers 23–16)
- (2:45) RUTG - Jai Patel 22-yard field goal (Drive: 6 plays, 42 yards, 1:49; Rutgers 26–16)
- (1:10) MINN - Dragan Kesich 30-yard field goal (Drive: 10 plays, 63 yards, 1:35; Rutgers 26–19)

Statistics	MINN	RUTG
First downs	18	19
Total yards	297	349
Rushing yards	35	109
Passing yards	262	240
Passing: Comp–Att–Int	27-45-0	17-33-1
Time of possession	28:01	31:59

Team	Category	Player	Statistics
Minneosta	Passing	Max Brosmer	27/45, 262 yards, TD
Minneosta	Rushing	Darius Taylor	10 carries, 28 yards, TD
Minneosta	Receiving	Jameson Geers	8 receptions, 73 yards
Rutgers	Passing	Athan Kaliakmanis	17/33, 240 yards, 3 TD, INT
Rutgers	Rushing	Antwan Raymond	22 carries, 73 yards
Rutgers	Receiving	Ian Strong	4 receptions, 89 yards, TD

=== vs No. 4 Penn State (Governor's Victory Bell) ===
No. 4 Penn State Nittany Lions (9–1) vs Minnesota Golden Gophers (6–4) – Game summary

Quarter	1	2	3	4	Total
No. 4 Nittany Lions	0	16	7	3	26
Golden Gophers	7	12	3	3	25

at Huntington Bank Stadium • Minneapolis, Minnesota

- Date: November 23
- Game time: 2:30 p.m.
- Game weather: 40 °F (4 °C), cloudy
- Game attendance: 44,266
- Referee: Chris Coyle
- TV announcers (CBS): Brad Nessler (play-by-play), Gary Danielson (analyst), and Jenny Dell (sideline reporter)
- GopherSports.com box score

Game information

First quarter

- (8:57) MINN - Marcus Major 20-yard rush (Dragan Kesich kick) (Drive: 9 plays, 70 yards, 4:12; Minnesota 7–0)

Second quarter

- (12:56) MINN - Dragan Kesich 48-yard field goal (Drive: 7 plays, 25 yards, 4:14; Minnesota 10–0)
- (10:48) PSU - Omari Evans 45-yard pass from Drew Allar (Ryan Barker kick) (Drive: 5 plays, 75 yards, 2:08; Minnesota 10–7)
- (7:50) PSU - Ryan Barker 45-yard field goal (Drive: 4 plays, -5 yards, 1:20; Tied 10–10)
- (1:03) MINN - Jameson Geers 21-yard pass from Max Brosmer (Dragan Kesich kick) (Drive: 1 play, 21 yards, 0:07; Minnesota 17–10)
- (0:19) PSU - Drew Allar 4-yard rush (PAT blocked) (Drive: 6 plays, 75 yards, 0:44; Minnesota 17–16)
- (0:18) MINN - Ethan Robinson defensive PAT conversion (Drive: 6 plays, 75 yards, 0:44; Minnesota 19–16)

Third quarter

- (9:59) MINN - Dragan Kesich 42-yard field goal (Drive: 9 plays, 51 yards, 5:01; Minnesota 22–16)
- (4:06) PSU - Nicholas Singleton 12-yard rush (Ryan Barker kick) (Drive: 5 plays, 57 yards, 1:58; Penn State 23–22)

Fourth quarter

- (11:51) PSU - Ryan Barker 32-yard field goal (Drive: 7 plays, 26 yards, 3:02; Penn State 26–22)
- (5:48) MINN - Dragan Kesich 26-yard field goal (Drive: 11 plays, 67 yards, 5:58; Penn State 26–25)

Statistics	PSU	MINN
First downs	20	18
Total yards	361	281
Rushing yards	117	106
Passing yards	244	175
Passing: Comp–Att–Int	21-28-0	15-23-1
Time of possession	25:49	34:11

Team	Category	Player	Statistics
Penn State	Passing	Drew Allar	21/28, 244 yards, TD
Penn State	Rushing	Nicholas Singleton	13 carries, 63 yards, TD
Penn State	Receiving	Tyler Warren	8 receptions, 102 yards
Minnesota	Passing	Max Brosmer	15/23, 175 yards, TD, INT
Minnesota	Rushing	Darius Taylor	17 carries, 58 yards
Minnesota	Receiving	Daniel Jackson	6 receptions, 90 yards

=== at Wisconsin (rivalry) ===
Minnesota Golden Gophers (6–5) at Wisconsin Badgers (5–6) – Game summary

Quarter	1	2	3	4	Total
Golden Gophers	7	7	7	3	24
Badgers	0	0	7	0	7

at Camp Randall Stadium • Madison, Wisconsin

- Date: November 29
- Game time: 11:00 a.m.
- Game weather: Cloudy, 22 °F (−6 °C); Wind: W 17 mph
- Game attendance: 76,059
- Referee: Bryan Banks
- TV announcers (CBS): Tom McCarthy (play-by-play), Jay Feely (analyst), and Tiffany Blackmon (sideline)
- GopherSports.com box score

Game information

First quarter

- (3:18) MINN - Max Brosmer 1-yard rush (Dragan Kesich kick) (Drive: 9 plays, 89 yards, 4:24; Minnesota 7–0)

Second quarter

- (11:37) MINN - Daniel Jackson 7-yard pass from Max Brosmer (Dragan Kesich kick) (Drive: 7 plays, 75 yards, 3:16; Minnesota 14–0)

Third quarter

- (8:03) MINN - Jameson Geers 15-yard pass from Max Brosmer (Dragan Kesich kick) (Drive: 11 plays, 83 yards, 6:02; Minnesota 21–0)
- (3:13) WIS - Vinny Anthony II 15-yard pass from Braedyn Locke (Nathanial Vakos kick) (Drive: 11 plays, 65 yards, 4:50; Minnesota 21–7)

Fourth quarter

- (3:19) MINN - Dragan Kesich 43-yard field goal (Drive: 9 plays, 35 yards, 4:38; Minnesota 24–7)

Statistics	MINN	WIS
First downs	21	12
Total yards	374	166
Rushing yards	183	36
Passing yards	191	130
Passing: Comp–Att–Int	17-26-0	15-32-0
Time of possession	35:51	24:09

Team	Category	Player	Statistics
Minneosta	Passing	Max Brosmer	17/26, 191 yards, 2 TD
Minneosta	Rushing	Darius Taylor	32 carries, 143 yards
Minneosta	Receiving	Elijah Spencer	5 receptions, 75 yards
Wisconsin	Passing	Braedyn Locke	15/32, 130 yards, TD
Wisconsin	Rushing	Tawee Walker	14 carries, 36 yards
Wisconsin	Receiving	Trech Kekahuna	6 receptions, 64 yards

=== vs Virginia Tech (Duke's Mayo Bowl) ===
2025 Duke's Mayo Bowl
Minnesota Golden Gophers (7–5) vs Virginia Tech Hokies (6–6) – Game summary

Quarter	1	2	3	4	Total
Golden Gophers	0	21	0	3	24
Hokies	7	3	0	0	10

at Bank of America Stadium • Charlotte, North Carolina

- Date: Friday, January 3, 2025
- Game time: 6:30 p.m. CST
- Game weather: Sunny • Temperature: 41 °F (5 °C) • Wind: 10 mph (16 km/h) west
- Game attendance: 31,927
- Referee: Jason Autrey
- TV announcers (ESPN/Bowl Season Radio): Matt Barrie (play-by-play), Aaron Murray (analyst), and Harry Lyles Jr. (sideline)/Jim Szoke (play-by-play), John Denton (analyst), and Molly Cotten (sideline)

Game information

First quarter

- (0:08) VT - Collin Schlee 3-yard rush (John Love kick) (Drive: 8 plays, 80 yards, 3:57; Virginia Tech 7–0)

Second quarter

- (10:18) MINN - Elijah Spencer 10-yard pass from Darius Taylor (Dragan Kesich kick) (Drive: 9 plays, 80 yards, 4:50; Tied 7–7)
- (5:13) MINN - Elijah Spencer 12-yard pass from Max Brosmer (Dragan Kesich kick) (Drive: 8 plays, 65 yards, 4:02; Minnesota 14–7)
- (0:56) MINN - Darius Taylor 28-yard rush (Dragan Kesich kick) (Drive: 6 plays, 58 yards, 0:52; Minnesota 21–7)
- (0:00) VT - John Love 60-yard field goal (Drive: 5 plays, 38 yards, 0:56; Minnesota 21–10)

Third quarter

- No scoring plays

Fourth quarter

- (11:59) MINN - Dragan Kesich 44-yard field goal (Drive: 15 plays, 66 yards, 9:20; Minnesota 24–10)

Statistics	MINN	VT
First downs	23	9
Total yards	403	223
Rushing yards	167	74
Passing yards	236	149
Passing: Comp–Att–Int	20-31-1	10-18-1
Time of possession	35:24	24:36

Team	Category	Player	Statistics
Minnesota	Passing	Max Brosmer	18/29, 211 yards, TD, INT
Minnesota	Rushing	Darius Taylor	20 carries, 113 yards, TD
Minnesota	Receiving	Elijah Spencer	6 receptions, 81 yards, 2 TD
Virginia Tech	Passing	William Watson III	8/12, 81 yards, INT
Virginia Tech	Rushing	Keylen Adams	1 carry, 47 yards
Virginia Tech	Receiving	Ayden Greene	6 receptions, 115 yards

== Roster ==
2024 Minnesota Golden Gophers football team roster
Players
Coaches
Offense

Pos.	#	Name	Class
WR	0	Le'Meke Brockington	Jr
RB	1	Darius Taylor	So
RB	2	Sieh Bangura	Jr
QB	3	Drake Lindsey	Fr
WR	4	Cristian Driver	So
WR	5	T. J. McWilliams	Fr
QB	6	Max Shikenjanski	Fr
WR	7	Tyler Williams	Fr
RB	8	Jaren Mangham	GS
WR	9	Daniel Jackson	GS
WR	11	Elijah Spencer	Sr
WR	12	Jalen Smith	Fr
WR	13	Kristen Hoskins	So
QB	14	Dylan Wittke	Fr
WR	15	Kenric Lanier II	Fr
QB	16	Max Brosmer	GS
WR	17	Cade Conzemius	So
WR	18	Donielle Hayes	Fr
TE	19	Pierce Walsh	Fr
QB	21	Jeremiah Finaly	Fr
RB	22	Jaydon Wright	Fr
RB	24	Marcus Major	GS
RB	25	Cortez LeGrant	Fr
RB	26	Fame Ijeboi	Fr
RB	27	Jordan Nubin	Jr
RB	33	Kaeden Johnson	Fr
RB	40	Zander Rockow	Fr
OL	50	Nathan Roy	Fr
OL	52	Spencer Alvarez	So
OL	55	Jerome Williams	Fr
OL	56	Brett Carroll	Fr
OL	58	Jackson Hunter	Jr
OL	59	Tony Nelson	So
OL	60	Phillip Daniels	Fr
OL	65	Greg Johnson	So
OL	69	Aireontae Ersery	Sr
OL	70	Aluma Nkele	Jr
OL	71	Martes Lewis	Sr
OL	75	Tyler Cooper	GS
OL	76	Reese Tripp	Fr
OL	77	Quinn Carroll	GS
OL	78	Ashton Beers	So
WR	80	Quentin Redding	Jr
TE	82	Julian Johnson	Fr
TE	83	Sam Peters	Fr
TE	84	Jack DiSano	So
TE	85	Frank Bierman	Sr
TE	86	Jameson Geers	Jr
TE	87	Nick Kallerup	GS
TE	88	Jacob Simpson	Fr
TE	89	Nathan Jones	So

Defense

Pos.	#	Name	Class
DL	0	Anthony Smith	So
DL	1	Jaxon Howard	Fr
DB	2	Ethan Robinson	Sr
DB	3	Koi Perich	Fr
DB	4	Za'Quan Bryan	Fr
DB	5	Justin Walley	Sr
LB	6	Maverick Baranowski	So
DB	7	Aidan Gousby	So
DL	8	Darnell Jefferies	GS
LB	9	Devon Williams	Jr
DL	11	Karter Menz	Fr
DB	12	Darius Green	Jr
DB	13	Mike Gerald	Fr
DB	14	Kerry Brown	Fr
DB	15	Samuel Madu	Fr
DB	16	Coleman Bryson	So
DL	17	Jah Joyner	Sr
DB	18	Rhyland Kelly	So
LB	19	Joey Gerlach	So
DB	20	Jack Henderson	GS
DB	21	Craig McDonald	Sr
DB	22	Evan Redding	So
DB	23	Garrison Monroe	Fr
DB	24	Jai'Onte' McMillan	Sr
DB	25	Zahir Rainer	Fr
DB	26	Obe Eyafe	Fr
DB	27	Simon Seidl	Fr
DB	28	Chris Flowers	Fr
DB	29	Ethan Carrier	Fr
LB	30	Drew Wilson	Fr
DB	31	Jordan Greenhow	Jr
LB	32	Alex Elliott	Fr
DB	33	Harrison Brun	Fr
LB	34	Jack Tinnen	So
LB	35	Derik LeCaptain	GS
DB	36	Jackson Powers	Fr
DL	42	Jack Hawkinson	Jr
LB	43	Eli Mau	Jr
LB	44	Tyler Stolsky	So
LB	45	Cody Lindenberg	Sr
LB	46	Lucas Finnessy	Sr
DL	47	Hayden Schwartz	So
LB	48	Mason Carrier	Fr
LB	49	Matt Kingsbury	Fr
DL	52	Luther McCoy	Jr
DL	55	Jaylin Hicks	Fr
DL	87	Martin Owusu	Fr
DL	89	Nate Becker	Jr
DL	91	Deven Eastern	Jr
DL	92	Danny Striggow	GS
DL	93	Riley Sunram	Fr
DL	94	Mo Saine	Fr
DL	95	Sam Macy	Fr
DL	96	Logan Richter	GS
DL	97	Jalen Logan-Redding	Sr
DL	98	Adam Kissayi	Fr
DL	99	Theorin Randle	Fr

Special teams

Pos.	#	Name	Class
K	30	Sam Henson	GS
LS	38	Ryan Algrim	Fr
LS	80	Alan Soukup	Fr
P	95	Caleb McGrath	Fr
P	96	Mark Crawford	GS
K	98	David Kemp	Jr
K	99	Dragan Kesich	GS

Head coach

- P. J. Fleck

Coordinators/assistant coaches

- Greg Harbaugh Jr. (co-offensive coordinator / quarterbacks)
- Matt Simon (co-offensive coordinator / wide receivers)
- Corey Hetherman (defensive coordinator / linebackers)
- Nick Monroe (co-defensive coordinator / cornerbacks)
- Bob Ligashesky (special teams coordinator)
- Danny Collins (safeties / pass game coordinator)
- Brian Callahan (run game coordinator / offensive line)
- Winston DeLattiboudere (defensive line)
- Nic McKissic-Luke (running backs)
- Eric Koehler (tight ends)
- Gerrit Chernoff (general manager)
- Dan Nichol (head strength & conditioning)
- Norries Wilson (director of player development)
- Mariano Sori-Marin (nickelbacks / assistant linebackers)

Legend

- (C) Team captain
- (S) Suspended
- (I) Ineligible
- Injured
- Redshirt

Roster
Last update: June 20, 2024
