= Jay Higgins =

American football player (born 2002)

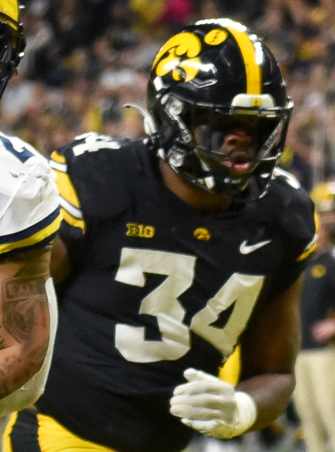
- Higgins with Iowa in 2023

No. 49 – Baltimore Ravens
- Position: Linebacker
- Roster status: Active

Personal information
- Born: February 14, 2002 (age 24); Indianapolis, Indiana, U.S.
- Listed height: 6 ft 0 in (1.83 m)
- Listed weight: 230 lb (104 kg)

Career information
- High school: Brebeuf Jesuit Prep (Indianapolis)
- College: Iowa (2020–2024)
- NFL draft: 2025: undrafted

Career history
- Baltimore Ravens (2025–present)

Awards and highlights
- Big Ten Linebacker of the Year (2024); Unanimous All-American (2024); First-team All-Big Ten (2023, 2024)
- Stats at Pro Football Reference

Roy Jebaz "Jay" Higgins IV (born February 14, 2002) is an American professional football linebacker for the Baltimore Ravens of the National Football League (NFL). He played college football for the Iowa Hawkeyes.

== Early life ==
Higgins was born on February 14, 2002, and attended Brebeuf Jesuit Preparatory School. He committed to play college football for the Iowa Hawkeyes.

== College career ==
As a freshman at the University of Iowa in 2020, Higgins notched just two tackles. In 2021, he totaled five tackles and a fumble recovery. In week 9 of the 2022 season, Higgins recorded a career-high 11 tackles versus Northwestern. He finished the season with 39 tackles with one and half going for a loss, and half a sack. Higgins tallied 16 tackles in the 2023 season opener against Utah State. In week 4, he notched a career-high 18 tackles versus Penn State. Higgins was a semifinalist for the 2023 Butkus Award and a first-team all-Big Ten Conference selection by both the coaches and the media. In 2024, Higgins was again named first team all-Big Ten and won the Big Ten Linebacker of the Year.

=== College statistics ===
Year	Team	Tackles				Sacks	Fumbles		INT	
Year	Team	Solo	Ast	Total	TFL	Total	FF	FR	INT	PD
2020	Iowa	2	0	2	0.0	0.0	0	0	0	0
2021	Iowa	3	2	5	0.0	0.0	0	1	0	0
2022	Iowa	20	19	39	2.0	0.5	0	0	0	0
2023	Iowa	79	92	171	5.0	2.0	1	2	1	4
2024	Iowa	53	71	124	3.0	1.0	2	1	4	5
Totals		157	184	341	10.0	3.5	3	4	5	9

== Professional career ==
Pre-draft measurables
Height	Weight	Arm length	Hand span	Wingspan	40-yard dash	10-yard split	20-yard split	20-yard shuttle	Three-cone drill	Vertical jump	Broad jump	Bench press
6 ft 0 1/8 in (1.83 m)	224 lb (102 kg)	31 in (0.79 m)	9 1/2 in (0.24 m)	6 ft 3 in (1.91 m)	4.82 s	1.64 s	2.79 s	4.35 s	7.01 s	33.0 in (0.84 m)	9 ft 2 in (2.79 m)	20 reps
All values from NFL Combine/Pro Day

Higgins signed with the Baltimore Ravens as an undrafted free agent on May 4, 2025. Higgins survived the final round of cuts and made the Ravens' initial 53-man roster. After suffering a knee injury in Baltimore's Week 10 victory over the Minnesota Vikings, he was placed on injured reserve on November 16. Higgins was activated on December 27, ahead of the team's Week 17 matchup against the Green Bay Packers.

== See also ==
- List of NCAA major college football yearly tackles leaders
