= 2024 Iowa Hawkeyes football team =

American college football season

2024 Iowa Hawkeyes football

Music City Bowl, L 24–27 vs. Missouri
- Conference: Big Ten Conference
- Record: 8–5 (6–3 Big Ten)
- Head coach: Kirk Ferentz (26th season)
- Offensive coordinator: Tim Lester (1st season)
- Offensive scheme: West Coast
- Defensive coordinator: Phil Parker (13th season)
- Base defense: 4–2–5
- Captains: Cade McNamara; Luke Lachey; Jay Higgins; Quinn Schulte
- Home stadium: Kinnick Stadium

2024 Big Ten Conference football standings
	Conf.			Overall
Team	W		L	W		L
No. 3 Oregon y$^	9	–	0	13	–	1
No. 10 Indiana ^	8	–	1	11	–	2
No. 5 Penn State y^	8	–	1	13	–	3
No. 1 Ohio State #^	7	–	2	14	–	2
No. 16 Illinois	6	–	3	10	–	3
Iowa	6	–	3	8	–	5
Michigan	5	–	4	8	–	5
Minnesota	5	–	4	8	–	5
USC	4	–	5	7	–	6
Rutgers	4	–	5	7	–	6
Washington	4	–	5	6	–	7
Nebraska	3	–	6	7	–	6
UCLA	3	–	6	5	–	7
Wisconsin	3	–	6	5	–	7
Northwestern	2	–	7	4	–	8
Maryland	1	–	8	4	–	8
Michigan State†	0	–	6	0	–	7
Purdue	0	–	9	1	–	11
Championship: Oregon 45, Penn State 37
# – College Football Playoff champion; ^ – College Football Playoff participant; $ – Conference champion; y – Championship game participant; † — NCAA vacated all wins for Michigan State (5–7, 3–6); Rankings from AP Poll

The 2024 Iowa Hawkeyes football team represented the University of Iowa as a member of the Big Ten Conference during the 2024 NCAA Division I FBS football season. The Hawkeyes were led by Kirk Ferentz in his 26th year as head coach. Iowa played their home games at Kinnick Stadium located in Iowa City, Iowa, and sold out all seven home contests for the third consecutive season.

The Hawkeyes ended the 2024 season with a 27–24 loss to No. 19 Missouri in the Music City Bowl to finish with an 8–5 record (6–3 Big Ten).

Senior linebacker Jay Higgins was named First-team All-Big Ten for the second time, Butkus–Fitzgerald Linebacker of the Year, and a Unanimous First-team All-American. Junior running back Kaleb Johnson was named First-team All-Big Ten, Ameche–Dayne Running Back of the Year, and a Consensus First-team All-American. He was also a finalist for the Doak Walker Award, and established single-season program records for rushing touchdowns (21) and total touchdowns (23). Senior return specialist Kaden Wetjen was named First-team All-Big Ten and Rodgers–Dwight Return Specialist of the Year.

== Player movement ==
=== Transfers in ===
Date	Player	Position	Previous Team	Notes	Ref
January 20, 2024	Kadyn Proctor	OT	Alabama Crimson Tide	SEC All-Freshman Team (2023)	
May 9, 2024	Brendan Sullivan	QB	Northwestern Wildcats	Started 8 games over two seasons	
May 14, 2024	Jacob Gill	WR	Northwestern Wildcats		

=== Transfers out ===
Date	Player	Position	Destination	Notes	Ref
November 13, 2023	Spencer Petras	QB	Utah State Aggies		
December 4, 2023	Anterio Thompson	DL	Western Michigan Broncos		
December 5, 2023	Joey Labas	QB	Central Michigan Chippewas		
April 16, 2024	Kadyn Proctor	OL	Alabama Crimson Tide		
April 23, 2024	Deacon Hill	QB	Utah Tech Trailblazers		

== Schedule ==
Date	Time	Opponent	Rank	Site	TV	Result	Attendance
August 31	11:00 a.m.	No. 19 (FCS) Illinois State*	No. 25	Kinnick Stadium; Iowa City, IA	BTN	W 40–0	69,250
September 7	2:30 p.m.	Iowa State*	No. 21	Kinnick Stadium; Iowa City, IA (Cy-Hawk Trophy)	CBS	L 19–20	69,250
September 14	3:00 p.m.	Troy*		Kinnick Stadium; Iowa City, IA	FS1	W 38–21	69,250
September 21	6:30 p.m.	at Minnesota		Huntington Bank Stadium; Minneapolis, MN (Floyd of Rosedale)	NBC	W 31–14	52,048
October 5	2:30 p.m.	at No. 3 Ohio State		Ohio Stadium; Columbus, OH	CBS	L 7–35	105,135
October 12	11:00 a.m.	Washington		Kinnick Stadium; Iowa City, IA	FOX	W 40–16	69,250
October 19	6:30 p.m.	at Michigan State		Spartan Stadium; East Lansing, MI	NBC	L 20–32 vacated	69,682
October 26	2:30 p.m.	Northwestern^{†}		Kinnick Stadium; Iowa City, IA	BTN	W 40–14	69,250
November 2	6:30 p.m.	Wisconsin		Kinnick Stadium; Iowa City, IA (Heartland Trophy)	NBC	W 42–10	69,250
November 8	8:00 p.m.	at UCLA		Rose Bowl; Pasadena, CA	FOX	L 17–20	53,467
November 23	11:00 a.m.	at Maryland		SECU Stadium; College Park, MD	BTN	W 29–13	30,214
November 29	6:30 p.m.	Nebraska		Kinnick Stadium; Iowa City, IA (Heroes Game)	NBC	W 13–10	69,250
December 30	1:30 p.m.	vs. No. 19 Missouri*		Nissan Stadium; Nashville, TN (Music City Bowl)	ESPN	L 24–27	43,375
*Non-conference game; ^{†}Homecoming; Rankings from AP Poll (and CFP Rankings, after November 5) - Released prior to game; All times are in Central time; Source:

== Rankings ==
Ranking movements Legend: ██ Increase in ranking ██ Decrease in ranking — = Not ranked RV = Received votes
	Week																
Poll	Pre	1	2	3	4	5	6	7	8	9	10	11	12	13	14	15	Final
AP	25	21	RV	RV	RV	RV	RV	RV	—	—	RV	—	—	—	—	—	—
Coaches	25	21	RV	RV	RV	RV	RV	RV	—	—	RV	—	—	RV	RV	RV	—
CFP	Not released										—	—	—	—	—	—	Not released

== Game summaries ==
=== No. 19 (FCS) Illinois State ===
Game One – No. 19 (FCS) Illinois State Redbirds (0–0) at No. 25 Iowa Hawkeyes (0–0) – Game summary

Quarter	1	2	3	4	Total
No. 19 (FCS) Redbirds	0	0	0	0	0
No. 25 Hawkeyes	3	3	13	21	40

at Kinnick Stadium • Iowa City, IA

- Date: Saturday August 31, 2024
- Game time: 11:00 AM CDT
- Game weather: 76 °F (24 °C), Sunny, Wind NW 4 mph (6.4 km/h)
- Game attendance: 69,250
- Referee: Mark Kluczynski
- TV announcers (BTN): Mark Followill (play-by-play), Anthony Herron (analyst), and Melanie Ricks (sideline)

Game information

First quarter

- 5:35 Iowa – Drew Stevens 41-yard field goal (Drive: 4 plays, 6 yards, 1:31; Iowa 3–0)

Second quarter

- 1:00 Iowa – Drew Stevens 28-yard field goal (Drive: 10 plays, 49 yards, 2:48; Iowa 6–0)

Third quarter

- 11:32 Iowa – Reece Vander Zee 7-yard pass from Cade McNamara (Two-Point Pass Conversion Failed) (Drive: 7 plays, 75 yards, 3:28; Iowa 12–0)
- 7:46 Iowa – Jacob Gill 31-yard pass from Cade McNamara (Drew Stevens kick) (Drive: 5 plays, 66 yards, 2:27; Iowa 19–0)

Fourth quarter

- 14:54 Iowa – Reece Vander Zee 19-yard pass from Cade McNamara (Drew Stevens kick) (Drive: 4 plays, 62 yards, 1:39; Iowa 26–0)
- 11:09 Iowa – Kaleb Johnson 64-yard run (Drew Stevens kick) (Drive: 4 plays, 77 yards, 2:04; Iowa 33–0)
- 5:48 Iowa – Kaleb Johnson 18-yard run (Drew Stevens kick) (Drive: 5 plays, 34 yards, 3:11; Iowa 40–0)

Iowa opened the season against Illinois State, whom they had played only once previously, a 31–14 win to open the 2015 season. The Hawkeyes had just a 6–0 lead at halftime, but the offense came alive in the second half, scoring 34 points behind a balanced attack. The Hawkeye defense forced three turnovers, had four sacks, and pitched a shutout in a game in which the Redbirds never put together a scoring threat. Head coach Kirk Ferentz served a one-game suspension following a recruiting violation, making this the first game since November 25, 1978, that neither Hayden Fry nor Ferentz patrolled the Iowa sideline.

Statistics	ILST	IOWA
First downs	12	23
Total yards	189	492
Rushing yards	56	241
Passing yards	133	251
Passing: Comp–Att–Int	14–29–1	21–31–0
Time of possession	25:12	34:48

Team	Category	Player	Statistics
Illinois State	Passing	Tommy Rittenhouse	10/20, 119 yards, INT
Illinois State	Rushing	Wenkers Wright	9 carries, 36 yards
Illinois State	Receiving	Xavier Loyd	4 receptions, 53 yards
Iowa	Passing	Cade McNamara	21/31, 251 yards, 3 TD
Iowa	Rushing	Kaleb Johnson	11 carries, 119 yards, 2 TD
Iowa	Receiving	Reece Vander Zee	5 receptions, 66 yards, 2 TD

=== Iowa State (rivalry) ===
Iowa State Cyclones (1–0) at No. 21 Iowa Hawkeyes (1–0) – Game summary

Quarter	1	2	3	4	Total
Cyclones	0	0	14	6	20
No. 21 Hawkeyes	7	6	6	0	19

at Kinnick Stadium • Iowa City, Iowa

- Date: September 7
- Game time: 2:40 p.m. CDT
- Game weather: 66 °F (19 °C), Sunny, Wind N 10 mph (16 km/h)
- Game attendance: 69,250
- Referee: Kevin Mar
- TV announcers (CBS): Brad Nessler (play-by-play), Gary Danielson (analyst), and Jenny Dell (sideline)

Game information

First quarter

- 6:29 Iowa – Kaleb Johnson 27-yard run (Drew Stevens kick) (Drive: 2 plays, 43 yards, 0:45; Iowa 7–0)

Second quarter

- 13:38 Iowa – Drew Stevens 23-yard field goal (Drive: 7 plays, 7 yards, 2:13; Iowa 10–0)
- 1:11 Iowa – Drew Stevens 21-yard field goal (Drive: 10 plays, 77 yards, 1:46; Iowa 13–0)

Third quarter

- 8:48 Iowa State – Jayden Higgins 3-yard pass from Rocco Becht (Kyle Konrardy kick) (Drive: 9 plays, 75 yards, 4:32; Iowa 13–7)
- 4:47 Iowa – Kaleb Johnson 3-yard run (Two-Point Pass Conversion Failed) (Drive: 7 plays, 79 yards, 3:55; Iowa 19–7)
- 4:36 Iowa State – Jaylin Noel 75-yard pass from Rocco Becht (Kyle Konrardy kick) (Drive: 1 plays, 75 yards, 0:11; Iowa 19–14)

Fourth quarter

- 11:32 Iowa State – Kyle Konrardy 46-yard field goal (Drive: 5 plays, 23 yards, 1:59; Iowa 19–17)
- 0:06 Iowa State – Kyle Konrardy 54-yard field goal (Drive: 5 plays, 42 yards, 0:28; Iowa State 20–19)

Iowa had won seven of the last eight in this trophy series. While the Hawkeyes had a double-digit lead at halftime, two first and goal situations inside the 5 yard line (that netted only 6 points) and a failed two-point conversion set the stage for Iowa State's comeback win.

Statistics	ISU	IOWA
First downs	15	16
Total yards	64–361	67–303
Rushing yards	28–89	38–204
Passing yards	272	99
Passing: comp–att–int	23–36–1	13–29–2
Time of possession	30:10	29:50

Team	Category	Player	Statistics
Iowa State	Passing	Rocco Becht	23/35, 272 yards, 2 TD, INT
Iowa State	Rushing	Abu Sama	17 carries, 58 yards
Iowa State	Receiving	Jayden Higgins	8 receptions, 68 yards, TD
Iowa	Passing	Cade McNamara	13/29, 99 yards, 2 INT
Iowa	Rushing	Kaleb Johnson	25 carries, 187 yards, 2 TD
Iowa	Receiving	Jacob Gill	4 receptions, 47 yards

=== Troy ===
(Gold Out Spirit game)

Troy Trojans (0–2) at Iowa Hawkeyes (1–1) – Game summary

Quarter	1	2	3	4	Total
Trojans	0	14	7	0	21
Hawkeyes	0	10	14	14	38

at Kinnick Stadium • Iowa City, Iowa

- Date: September 14
- Game time: 3:05 p.m. CDT
- Game weather: 82 °F (28 °C), Cloudy, Wind SE 6 mph (9.7 km/h)
- Game attendance: 69,250
- Referee: Chris Coyte
- TV announcers (FS1): Eric Collins (play-by-play) and Spencer Tillman (analyst)

Game information

Second quarter

- 11:12 Iowa – Kaleb Johnson 4-yard run (Drew Stevens kick) (Drive: 7 plays, 56 yards, 2:51; Iowa 7–0)
- 9:08 Troy – Devonte Ross 63-yard pass from Matthew Caldwell (Scott Taylor Renfroe kick) (Drive: 4 plays, 75 yards, 2:04; Tied 7–7)
- 6:24 Iowa – Drew Stevens 42-yard field goal (Drive: 6 plays, 51 yards, 2:44; Iowa 10–7)
- 1:00 Troy – Devonte Ross 77-yard punt return (Scott Taylor Renfroe kick) (Troy 14–10)

Third quarter

- 6:44 Iowa – Addison Ostrenga 2-yard pass from Brendan Sullivan (Drew Stevens kick) (Drive: 8 plays, 70 yards, 4:30; Iowa 17–14)
- 2:30 Iowa – Jermari Harris 28-yard interception return (Drew Stevens kick) (Iowa 24–14)
- 0:58 Troy – Devonte Ross 62-yard pass from Tucker Kilcrease (Scott Taylor Renfroe kick) (Drive: 3 plays, 75 yards, 1:32; Tied 24–21)

Fourth quarter

- 12:05 Iowa – Kaleb Johnson 33-yard run (Drew Stevens kick) (Drive: 8 plays, 75 yards, 3:53; Iowa 31–21)
- 6:01 Iowa – Jaziun Patterson 39-yard run (Drew Stevens kick) (Drive: 6 plays, 71 yards, 3:15; Iowa 38–21)

In the last non-conference game for the Hawkeyes, the team struggled in the first half but put up four touchdowns in the second.

Statistics	TROY	IOWA
First downs	10	25
Total yards	47–253	69–462
Rushing yards	21–24	45–284
Passing yards	229	178
Passing: comp–att–int	16–26–1	20–24–0
Time of possession	23:41	36:19

Team	Category	Player	Statistics
Troy	Passing	Matthew Caldwell	14/21, 156 yards, TD, INT
Troy	Rushing	Damien Taylor	7 carries, 20 yards
Troy	Receiving	Devonte Ross	5 receptions, 142 yards, 2 TD
Iowa	Passing	Cade McNamara	19/23, 176 yards
Iowa	Rushing	Kaleb Johnson	25 carries, 173 yards, 2 TD
Iowa	Receiving	Jacob Gill	5 receptions, 44 yards

=== at Minnesota (rivalry) ===
Iowa Hawkeyes (2–1) at Minnesota Golden Gophers (2–1) – Game summary

Quarter	1	2	3	4	Total
Hawkeyes	7	0	17	7	31
Golden Gophers	0	14	0	0	14

at Huntington Bank Stadium • Minneapolis, Minnesota

- Date: September 21
- Game time: 6:35 p.m. CDT
- Game weather: 76 °F (24 °C), Sunny, Wind NW 10 mph (16 km/h)
- Game attendance: 52,048
- Referee: Kole Knueppel
- TV announcers (NBC): Noah Eagle (play-by-play), Todd Blackledge (analyst), and Kathryn Tappen (sideline)

Game information

First quarter

- 8:03 Iowa – Kaleb Johnson 1-yard run (Drew Stevens kick) (Drive: 5 plays, 38 yards, 2:05; Iowa 7–0)

Second quarter

- 4:20 Minnesota – Jameson Geers 3-yard pass from Max Brosmer (Dragan Kesich kick) (Drive: 7 plays, 64 yards, 4:32; Tied 7–7)
- 0:21 Minnesota – Elijah Spencer 11-yard pass from Max Brosmer (Dragan Kesich kick) (Drive: 8 plays, 68 yards, 2:24; Minnesota 14–7)

Third quarter

- 12:56 Iowa – Kaleb Johnson 15-yard run (Drew Stevens kick) (Drive: 5 plays, 67 yards, 1:59; Tied 14–14)
- 5:43 Iowa – Kaleb Johnson 40-yard run (Drew Stevens kick) (Drive: 6 plays, 73 yards, 2:58; Iowa 21–14)
- 0:43 Iowa – Drew Stevens 46-yard field goal (Drive: 9 plays, 34 yards, 3:59; Iowa 24–14)

Fourth quarter

- 11:13 Iowa – Brendan Sullivan 1-yard run (Drew Stevens kick) (Drive: 6 plays, 52 yards, 3:40; Iowa 31–14)

Iowa was out for revenge and to recapture Floyd after the previous year's controversial ending. They were outplayed in the first half but completely dominated the second. The victory was the fifth consecutive for the Hawkeyes at Huntington Bank Stadium and tied Kirk Ferentz with Amos Alonzo Stagg in career wins as a Big Ten coach (199).

Statistics	IOWA	MINN
First downs	19	15
Total yards	64–334	58–288
Rushing yards	45–272	21–79
Passing yards	62	209
Passing: comp–att–int	11–19–0	22–37–2
Time of possession	31:43	28:17

Team	Category	Player	Statistics
Iowa	Passing	Cade McNamara	11/19, 62 yard
Iowa	Rushing	Kaleb Johnson	21 carries, 206 yards, 3 TD
Iowa	Receiving	Addison Ostrenga	2 receptions, 20 yards
Minnesota	Passing	Max Brosmer	22/37, 209 yards, 2 TD, 2 INT
Minnesota	Rushing	Darius Taylor	10 carries, 34 yards
Minnesota	Receiving	Daniel Jackson	9 receptions, 112 yards

=== at No. 3 Ohio State ===
Iowa Hawkeyes (3–1) at No. 3 Ohio State Buckeyes (4–0) – Game summary

Quarter	1	2	3	4	Total
Hawkeyes	0	0	0	7	7
No. 3 Buckeyes	7	0	21	7	35

at Ohio Stadium • Columbus, Ohio

- Date: October 5
- Game time: 3:40 p.m. EDT
- Game weather: 76 °F (24 °C), Sunny
- Game attendance: 105,135
- Referee: Jeffrey Servinski
- TV announcers (CBS): Brad Nessler (play-by-play), Gary Danielson (analyst), and Jenny Dell (sideline)
- Box Score

Game information

First quarter

- 3:41 Ohio State – Emeka Egbuka 14-yard pass from Will Howard (Jayden Fielding kick) (Drive: 14 plays, 88 yards, 7:36; Ohio State 7–0)

Third quarter

- 9:34 Ohio State – Jeremiah Smith 4-yard pass from Will Howard (Jayden Fielding kick) (Drive: 9 plays, 86 yards, 5:17; Ohio State 14–0)
- 7:59 Ohio State – Will Howard 4-yard run (Jayden Fielding kick) (Drive: 3 plays, 19 yards, 1:22; Ohio State 21–0)
- 0:13 Ohio State – Emeka Egbuka 15-yard pass from Will Howard (Jayden Fielding kick) (Drive: 6 plays, 40 yards, 3:40; Ohio State 28–0)

Fourth quarter

- 10:58 Ohio State – Emeka Egbuka 3-yard pass from Will Howard (Jayden Fielding kick) (Drive: 7 plays, 27 yards, 3:54; Ohio State 35–0)
- 8:07 Iowa – Kaleb Johnson 28-yard run (Drew Stevens kick) (Drive: 5 plays, 75 yards, 2:51; Ohio State 35–7)

The Hawkeyes haven't won in Columbus since 1991 and were humbled during their last visit two years prior. After a competitive first half the Buckeyes ran away with the game in the second.

Statistics	IOWA	OSU
First downs	10	21
Total yards	48–226	65–412
Rushing yards	27–116	40–203
Passing yards	110	209
Passing: comp–att–int	15–21–1	21–25–1
Time of possession	25:14	34:46

Team	Category	Player	Statistics
Iowa	Passing	Cade McNamara	14/20, 98 yards, INT
Iowa	Rushing	Kaleb Johnson	15 carries, 86 yards, TD
Iowa	Receiving	Luke Lachey	5 receptions, 39 yards
Ohio State	Passing	Will Howard	21/25, 209 yards, 4 TD, INT
Ohio State	Rushing	Quinshon Judkins	13 carries, 78 yards
Ohio State	Receiving	Jeremiah Smith	4 receptions, 89 yards, TD

=== Washington ===
(ANF Black and Gold Spirit Game)

Washington Huskies (4–2) at Iowa Hawkeyes (3–2) – Game summary

Quarter	1	2	3	4	Total
Huskies	0	10	0	6	16
Hawkeyes	7	13	3	17	40

at Kinnick Stadium • Iowa City, Iowa

- Date: October 12
- Game time: 11:11 a.m.
- Game weather: 70 °F (21 °C), Sunny
- Game attendance: 69,250
- Referee: Tim O'Dey
- TV announcers (Fox): Jason Benetti (play-by-play), Brock Huard (analyst), and Allison Williams (sideline)
- Box Score

Game information

First quarter

- 1:33 Iowa – Kaleb Johnson 6-yard run (Drew Stevens kick) (Drive: 9 plays, 80 yards, 4:24; Iowa 7–0)

Second quarter

- 9:19 Washington – Denzel Boston 5-yard pass from Will Rogers (Grady Gross kick) (Drive: 14 plays, 75 yards, 7:14; Tied 7–7)
- 4:43 Iowa – Drew Stevens 37-yard field goal (Drive: 4 plays, 0 yards, 1:27; Iowa 10–7)
- 1:28 Iowa – Kaleb Johnson 18-yard pass from Cade McNamara (Drew Stevens kick) (Drive: 5 plays, 35 yards, 1:40; Iowa 17–7)
- 0:29 Washington – Grady Gross 35-yard field goal (Drive: 9 plays, 58 yards, 0:59; Iowa 17–10)
- 0:00 Iowa – Drew Stevens 46-yard field goal (Drive: 4 plays, 53 yards, 0:24; Iowa 20–10)

Third quarter

- 7:22 Iowa – Drew Stevens 25-yard field goal (Drive: 9 plays, 47 yards, 4:21; Iowa 23–10)

Fourth quarter

- 14:56 Iowa – Kaleb Johnson 8-yard run (Drew Stevens kick) (Drive: 8 plays, 61 yards, 4:29; Iowa 30–10)
- 12:51 Iowa – Dayton Howard 33-yard pass from Cade McNamara (Drew Stevens kick) (Drive: 1 plays, 33 yards, 0:07; Iowa 37–10)
- 9:45 Iowa – Drew Stevens 51-yard field goal (Drive: 4 plays, 5 yards, 1:32; Iowa 40–10)
- 2:58 Washington – Rashid Williams 2-yard pass from Demond Williams Jr. (pass failed) (Drive: 17 plays, 75 yards, 6:47; Iowa 40–16)

These programs hadn't faced each other since the 1995 Sun Bowl. Playing Washington for the first time as a Big Ten opponent, Iowa held a 10-point halftime lead before dominating the second half. The victory gave Kirk Ferentz his 200th win at Iowa.

Statistics	WASH	IOWA
First downs	23	20
Total yards	80–393	51–328
Rushing yards	30–127	37–220
Passing yards	266	108
Passing: comp–att–int	34–50–1	8–14–0
Time of possession	34:59	22:03

Team	Category	Player	Statistics
Washington	Passing	Will Rogers	22/34, 195 yards, TD, INT
Washington	Rushing	Jonah Coleman	9 carries, 80 yards
Washington	Receiving	Giles Jackson	9 receptions, 63 yards
Iowa	Passing	Cade McNamara	8/14, 108 yards, 2 TD
Iowa	Rushing	Kaleb Johnson	21 carries, 166 yards, 2 TD
Iowa	Receiving	Dayton Howard	1 reception, 33 yards, TD

=== at Michigan State ===
Iowa Hawkeyes (4–2) at Michigan State Spartans (3–3) – Game summary

Quarter	1	2	3	4	Total
Hawkeyes	0	0	14	6	20
Spartans	6	6	7	13	32

at Spartan Stadium • East Lansing, Michigan

- Date: October 19
- Game time: 7:34 p.m. EDT
- Game weather: 60 °F (16 °C), Wind: 4 mph SW, Clear
- Game attendance: 69,682
- Referee: Ron Snodgrass
- TV announcers (NBC): Noah Eagle (play-by-play), Todd Blackledge (analyst), and Kathryn Tappen (sideline)

Game information

First quarter

- (11:02) MSU FG: Jonathan Kim 42-yard field goal MSU 3–0; 8 plays, 52 yards, 3:58
- (05:58) MSU FG: Jonathan Kim 43-yard field goal MSU 6–0; 9 plays, 64 yards, 3:37

Second quarter

- (11:48) MSU FG: Jonathan Kim 36-yard field goal MSU 9–0; 7 plays, 42 yards, 5:58
- (02:28) MSU FG: Jonathan Kim 29-yard field goal MSU 12–0; 9 plays, 69 yards, 5:58
- (09:52) IOW TD: Reece Vander Zee 18-yard pass from Cade McNamara (Drew Stevens kick) MSU 12–7; 8 plays, 58 yards, 5:00

Third quarter

- (04:34) MSU TD: Montorie Foster Jr. 18-yard pass from Aidan Chiles (Jonathan Kim kick) MSU 19–7; 9 plays, 75 yards, 5:18
- (00:49) IOW TD: Brendan Sullivan 2-yard run (Drew Stevens kick) MSU 19–14; 8 plays, 69 yards, 3:39

Four quarter

- (11:52) MSU FG: Jonathan Kim 55-yard field goal MSU 22–14; 7 plays, 38 yards, 3:57
- (07:34) MSU FG: Jonathan Kim 46-yard field goal MSU 25–14; 6 plays, 2 yards, 3:18
- (07:22) IOW TD: Kaleb Johnson 75-yard run (Jonathan Kim kick) MSU 25–20; 1 plays, 75 yards, 00:12
- (02:03) MSU TD: Nate Carter 1-yard run (Jonathan Kim kick) MSU 32–20; 9 plays, 75 yards, 5:19

Iowa's offense sputtered for most of the game, and Michigan State sustained drives consistently in earning a homecoming victory in East Lansing.

Statistics	IOWA	MSU
First downs	12	27
Total yards	46–283	70–468
Rushing yards	23–133	40–212
Passing yards	150	256
Passing: comp–att–int	11–23–1	22–30–1
Time of possession	20:16	39:44

Team	Category	Player	Statistics
Iowa	Passing	Cade McNamara	11/23, 150 yards, TD, INT
Iowa	Rushing	Kaleb Johnson	14 carries, 98 yards, TD
Iowa	Receiving	Kaleb Johnson	4 receptions, 49 yards
Michigan State	Passing	Aidan Chiles	22/30, 256 yards, TD, INT
Michigan State	Rushing	Kay'Ron Lynch-Adams	15 carries, 86 yards
Michigan State	Receiving	Nick Marsh	8 receptions, 113 yards

=== Northwestern ===
(Homecoming)

Northwestern Wildcats (3–4) at Iowa Hawkeyes (4–3) – Game summary

Quarter	1	2	3	4	Total
Wildcats	7	0	0	7	14
Hawkeyes	5	7	28	0	40

at Kinnick Stadium • Iowa City, Iowa

- Date: October 26
- Game time: 2:40 p.m.
- Game weather: 61 °F (16 °C), Sunny, Wind E 7 mph (11 km/h)
- Game attendance: 69,250
- Referee: Chris Coyle
- TV announcers (BTN): Chris Vosters (play-by-play), Anthony Herron (analyst), and Kylen Mills (sideline)
- Box Score

Game information

First quarter

- 6:10 Iowa – Drew Stevens 24-yard field goal (Drive: 10 plays, 62 yards, 4:47; Iowa 3–0)

Second quarter

- 9:31 NW – T. Johnson 85-yard interception return (L. Akers kick) (NW 7–3)
- 7:07 Iowa – Max Llewellyn Safety (NW 7–5)
- 0:39 Iowa – Kaleb Johnson 26-yard run (Drew Stevens kick) (Drive: 5 plays, 52 yards, 0:43; Iowa 12–7)

Third quarter

- 11:18 Iowa – Brendan Sullivan 6-yard run (Drew Stevens kick) (Drive: 7 plays, 78 yards, 3:37; Iowa 19–7)
- 8:54 Iowa – Kaden Wetjen 85-yard punt return (Drew Stevens kick) (Iowa 26–7)
- 4:32 Iowa – Kaleb Johnson 41-yard run (Drew Stevens kick) (Drive: 8 plays, 64 yards, 3:59; Iowa 33–7)
- 0:27 Iowa – Kaleb Johnson 25-yard run (Drew Stevens kick) (Drive: 1 play, 25 yards, 0:07; Iowa 40–7)

Fourth quarter

- 6:39 NW – D. Wagner 72-yard punt return (L. Akers kick) (Iowa 40–14)

Iowa has won four of last five in this series. However, the Wildcats have spoiled two previous homecomings in the Ferentz era (2008, 2016). After struggling for most of the first half, the Iowa offense exploded in the third quarter with four touchdowns.

Statistics	NW	IOWA
First downs	11	14
Total yards	51–163	66–355
Rushing yards	24–43	39–203
Passing yards	120	152
Passing: comp–att–int	15–27–2	16–27–1
Time of possession	25:36	34:24

Team	Category	Player	Statistics
Northwestern	Passing	Jack Lausch	10/19, 62 yards, 2 INT
Northwestern	Rushing	Cam Porter	13 carries, 50 yards
Northwestern	Receiving	A. J. Henning	2 receptions, 22 yards
Iowa	Passing	Brendan Sullivan	9/14, 79 yards
Iowa	Rushing	Kaleb Johnson	14 carries, 109 yards, 3 TD
Iowa	Receiving	Seth Anderson	2 receptions, 44 yards

=== Wisconsin (rivalry) ===
(Black out/ Military Game)

Wisconsin Badgers (5–3) at Iowa Hawkeyes (5–3) – Game summary

Quarter	1	2	3	4	Total
Badgers	3	0	0	7	10
Hawkeyes	0	14	14	14	42

at Kinnick Stadium • Iowa City, Iowa

- Date: November 2
- Game time: 6:34 p.m. CDT
- Game weather: 56 °F (13 °C), Cloudy with rain, Wind SE 8 mph (13 km/h)
- Game attendance: 69,250
- Referee: Jeffrey Servinski
- TV announcers (NBC): Noah Eagle (play-by-play), Todd Blackledge (analyst), and Kathryn Tappen (sideline)
- Box Score

Game information

First quarter

- 6:15 Wisconsin – Nathanial Vakos 38-yard field goal (Drive: 12 plays, 59 yards, 6:29; Wisconsin 3–0)

Second quarter

- 12:49 Iowa – Brendan Sullivan 1-yard run (Drew Stevens kick) (Drive: 7 plays, 53 yards, 2:58; Iowa 7–3)
- 8:49 Iowa – Kaleb Johnson 16-yard run (Drew Stevens kick) (Drive: 6 plays, 80 yards, 2:55; Iowa 14–3)

Third quarter

- 6:24 Iowa – Kaleb Johnson 9-yard run (Drew Stevens kick) (Drive: 10 plays, 86 yards, 5:34; Iowa 21–3)
- 4:17 Iowa – Jacob Gill 7-yard pass from Brendan Sullivan (Drew Stevens kick) (Drive: 1 play, 12 yards, 0:18; Iowa 28–3)

Fourth quarter

- 14:12 Wisconsin – CJ Williams 14-yard pass from Braedyn Locke (Nathanial Vakos kick) (Iowa 28–10)
- 9:42 Iowa – Kaleb Johnson 2-yard run (Drew Stevens kick) (Drive: 8 plays, 77 yards, 4:24; Iowa 35–10)
- 1:15 Iowa – Jaziun Patterson 4-yard run (Drew Stevens kick) (Drive: 12 plays, 66 yards, 7:13; Iowa 42–10)

Wisconsin hasn't won at Kinnick Stadium since 2018. Iowa also hadn't won three in a row in this series in two decades. This was the first career start at Iowa for Brendan Sullivan. The Hawkeyes capitalized on two interceptions to keep the bull in Iowa City for a third year in a row and reach bowl eligibility for a twelfth consecutive year.

Statistics	WIS	IOWA
First downs	16	22
Total yards	57–261	64–422
Rushing yards	28–124	54–329
Passing yards	137	93
Passing: comp–att–int	15–29–2	7–10–0
Time of possession	26:34	33:26

Team	Category	Player	Statistics
Wisconsin	Passing	Braedyn Locke	15/29, 137 yards, TD, 2 INT
Wisconsin	Rushing	Darrion Dupree	7 carries, 52 yards
Wisconsin	Receiving	Vinny Anthony II	4 receptions, 61 yards
Iowa	Passing	Brendan Sullivan	7/10, 93 yards, TD
Iowa	Rushing	Kaleb Johnson	24 carries, 135 yards, 3 TD
Iowa	Receiving	Zach Ortwerth	3 receptions, 66 yards

=== at UCLA ===
Iowa Hawkeyes (6–3) at UCLA Bruins (3–5) – Game summary

Quarter	1	2	3	4	Total
Hawkeyes	10	0	0	7	17
Bruins	0	17	0	3	20

at Rose Bowl • Pasadena, California

- Date: November 8
- Game time: 6:05 p.m. PST
- Game weather: 62 °F (17 °C), Sunny, Wind NW 4 mph (6.4 km/h)
- Game attendance: 53,467
- Referee: Ron Snodgrass
- TV announcers (FOX): Connor Onion (play-by-play) and Mark Helfrich (color analyst)
- Box score

Game information

First quarter

- (11:44) IOWA – Kaleb Johnson 2-yard run, Drew Stevens kick (Drive: 3 plays, 41 yards, 1:46; Iowa 7–0)
- (0:55) IOWA – Drew Stevens 24-yard field goal (Drive: 7 plays, 74 yards, 3:54; Iowa 10–0)

Second quarter

- (11:41) UCLA – Mateen Bhaghani 57-yard field goal (Drive: 11 plays, 36 yards, 4:14; Iowa 10–3)
- (8:05) UCLA – Titus Mokiao-Atimalala 2-yard pass from Ethan Garbers, Mateen Bhaghani kick (Drive: 6 plays, 45 yards, 3:23; Tied 10–10)
- (0:55) UCLA – Logan Loya 29-yard pass from Ethan Garbers, Mateen Bhaghani kick (Drive: 5 plays, 56 yards, 0:56; UCLA 17–10)

Third quarter

No scoring plays

Fourth quarter

- (11:27) IOWA – Kamari Moulton 1-yard run, Drew Stevens kick (Drive: 13 plays, 61 yards, 7:35; Tied 17–17)
- (4:49) UCLA – Mateen Bhaghani 27-yard field goal (Drive: 13 plays, 66 yards, 6:38; UCLA 20–17)

After a strong first quarter, the Hawkeyes remain winless at the Rose Bowl since January 1, 1959. UCLA won their third straight with a strong running game and limiting the running game of the Hawkeyes, who had been the Big Ten's top rushing team. This was the first matchup in the series since the 1986 Rose Bowl, the first regular season matchup since the 1981 season, and Iowa's first visit to Pasadena since the 2016 Rose Bowl.

Statistics	IOWA	UCLA
First downs	12	23
Total yards	46–265	73–414
Rushing yards	31–80	39–211
Passing yards	185	203
Passing: comp–att–int	9–15–2	21–34–2
Time of possession	22:27	37:33

Team	Category	Player	Statistics
Iowa	Passing	Brendan Sullivan	6/9, 157 yards, 2 INT
Iowa	Rushing	Kaleb Johnson	18 carries, 49 yards, TD
Iowa	Receiving	Jacob Gill	6 receptions, 138 yards
UCLA	Passing	Ethan Garbers	21/34, 203 yards, 2 TD, 2 INT
UCLA	Rushing	T. J. Harden	20 carries, 125 yards
UCLA	Receiving	Logan Loya	5 receptions, 94 yards, TD

=== at Maryland ===
Iowa Hawkeyes (6–4) at Maryland Terrapins (4–6) – Game summary

Quarter	1	2	3	4	Total
Hawkeyes	3	10	6	10	29
Terrapins	0	0	6	7	13

at SECU Stadium • College Park, Maryland

- Date: November 23
- Game time: 12:01 p.m. EST
- Game weather: 53 °F (12 °C), Sunny, Wind NW 12 mph (19 km/h)
- Game attendance: 30,214
- Referee: Tim O'Dey
- TV announcers (BTN): Guy Haberman (play-by-play), Yogi Roth (analyst), and Rhett Lewis (sideline)
- Box score

Game information

First quarter

- 0:22 Iowa – Drew Stevens 27-yard field goal (Drive: 13 plays, 59 yards, 6:20; Iowa 3–0)

Second quarter

- 6:29 Iowa – Kaleb Johnson 2-yard run (Drew Stevens kick) (Drive: 14 plays, 77 yards, 7:26; Iowa 10–0)
- 1:00 Iowa – Drew Stevens 54-yard field goal (Drive: 6 plays, 8 yards, 0:29; Iowa 13–0)

Third quarter

- 11:05 Iowa – Drew Stevens 50-yard field goal (Drive: 5 plays, 19 yards, 2:26; Iowa 16–0)
- 5:57 Maryland – Tai Felton 8-yard pass from MJ Morris (pass failed) (Drive: 11 plays, 70 yards, 5:08; Iowa 16–6)
- 0:00 Iowa – Drew Stevens 49-yard field goal (Drive: 4 plays, 7 yards, 1:19; Iowa 19–6)

Fourth quarter

- 11:05 Maryland – Tai Felton 12-yard pass from MJ Morris (pass failed) (Drive: 8 plays, 65 yards, 3:54; Iowa 19–13)
- 9:19 Iowa – Kamari Moulton 68-yard run (Drew Stevens kick) (Drive: 4 plays, 80 yards, 1:41; Iowa 26–13)
- 2:10 Iowa – Drew Stevens 26-yard field goal (Drive: 7 plays, 25 yards, 3:04; Iowa 29–13)

The Hawkeyes bounced back against Maryland – a team they haven't lost to since 2014 – to earn the 700th win in program history. This was also the first time Brian Ferentz coached against his father. Five Drew Stevens field goals – tying a single-game program record – kept Iowa in the lead throughout. Junior running back Kaleb Johnson set the single-season program record for rushing touchdowns (21).

Statistics	IOWA	MD
First downs	21	14
Total yards	72–344	57–227
Rushing yards	58–268	26–98
Passing yards	76	129
Passing: comp–att–int	10–14–0	17–31–2
Time of possession	37:41	22:19

Team	Category	Player	Statistics
Iowa	Passing	Jackson Stratton	10/14, 76 yards
Iowa	Rushing	Kaleb Johnson	35 carries, 164 yards, TD
Iowa	Receiving	Jacob Gill	4 receptions, 29 yards
Maryland	Passing	MJ Morris	12/23, 103 yards, 2 TD, 2 INT
Maryland	Rushing	Nolan Ray	4 carries, 48 yards
Maryland	Receiving	Tai Felton	6 receptions, 57 yards, 2 TD

=== Nebraska (rivalry) ===
Nebraska Cornhuskers (6–5) at Iowa Hawkeyes (7–4) – Game summary

Quarter	1	2	3	4	Total
Cornhuskers	3	7	0	0	10
Hawkeyes	0	0	3	10	13

at Kinnick Stadium • Iowa City, Iowa

- Date: November 29
- Game time: 6:38 p.m. CST
- Game weather: 20 °F (−7 °C), Clear, Wind NW 8 mph (13 km/h)
- Game attendance: 69,250
- Referee: Chris Coyte
- TV announcers (NBC): Paul Burmeister (play-by-play), Colt McCoy (color analyst), and Zora Stephenson (sideline)
- Box score

Game information

First quarter

- 7:28 Nebraska – John Hohl 31-yard field goal (Drive: 10 plays, 64 yards, 5:23; Nebraska 3–0)

Second quarter

- 0:38 Nebraska – Dante Dowdell 1-yard run (John Hohl kick) (Drive: 12 plays, 74 yards, 4:01; Nebraska 10–0)

Third quarter

- 4:30 Iowa – Drew Stevens 20-yard field goal (Drive: 4 plays, 2 yards, 2:06; Nebraska 10–3)

Fourth quarter

- 14:44 Iowa – Kaleb Johnson 72-yard pass from Jackson Stratton (Drew Stevens kick) (Drive: 3 plays, 86 yards, 1:02; Tied 10–10)
- 0:00 Iowa – Drew Stevens 53-yard field goal (Drive: 3 plays, 1 yard, 0:20; Iowa 13–10)

Iowa won for the ninth time in ten tries in this rivalry series. Drew Stevens nailed a 53-yard field goal as time expired to keep the Heroes Trophy in Iowa City.

Statistics	NEB	IOWA
First downs	20	5
Total yards	76–334	41–164
Rushing yards	43–144	26–49
Passing yards	190	115
Passing: comp–att–int	22–33–0	8–15–0
Time of possession	39:01	20:59

Team	Category	Player	Statistics
Nebraska	Passing	Dylan Raiola	22/32, 190 yards
Nebraska	Rushing	Emmett Johnson	18 carries, 71 yards
Nebraska	Receiving	Jahmal Banks	4 receptions, 41 yards
Iowa	Passing	Jackson Stratton	8/15, 115 yards, TD
Iowa	Rushing	Kaleb Johnson	17 carries, 45 yards
Iowa	Receiving	Kaleb Johnson	2 receptions, 73 yards, TD

=== vs No. 19 Missouri (Music City Bowl) ===
2024 Music City Bowl
Iowa Hawkeyes (8-4) vs No. 19 Missouri Tigers (9–3) – Game summary

Quarter	1	2	3	4	Total
Hawkeyes	14	7	3	0	24
No. 19 Tigers	7	7	7	6	27

at Nissan Stadium • Nashville, Tennessee

- Date: Monday, December 30, 2024
- Game time: 1:30 p.m. CST
- Game weather: Sunny • Temperature: 61 °F (16 °C) • Wind: 6 mph (9.7 km/h) Southeast
- Game attendance: 43,375
- Referee: Mike Roche
- TV announcers (ESPN/ESPN Radio): Taylor Zarzour (play-by-play), Matt Stinchcomb (analyst), and Alyssa Lang (sideline)/Kevin Winter (play-by-play) and Orlando Franklin (analyst)

Game information

First quarter

- (7:49) IOWA – Terrell Washington Jr. 6–yard pass from Brendan Sullivan, Drew Stevens kick (Drive: 8 plays, 70 yards, 4:32; Iowa 7–0)
- (2:12) MIZ – Theo Wease Jr. 8–yard pass from Brady Cook, Blake Craig kick (Drive: 10 plays, 85 yards, 5:33; Tied 7–7)
- (1:59) IOWA – Kaden Wetjen 100–yard kickoff return, Drew Stevens kick (Drive: 10 plays, 85 yards, 5:33; Iowa 14–7)

Second quarter

- (13:28) MIZ – Marquis Johnson 7–yard pass from Brady Cook, Blake Craig kick (Drive: 7 plays, 75 yards, 3:31; Tied 14–14)
- (0:49) IOWA – Kamari Moulton 1–yard run, Drew Stevens kick (Drive: 11 plays, 90 yards, 3:50; Iowa 21–14)

Third quarter

- (5:19) IOWA – Drew Stevens 38–yard field goal (Drive: 9 plays, 35 yards, 5:13; Iowa 24–14)
- (1:49) MIZ – Joshua Manning 4–yard run, Blake Craig kick (Drive: 7 plays, 75 yards, 3:30; Iowa 24–21)

Fourth quarter

- (10:10) MIZ – Blake Craig 51–yard field goal (Drive: 7 plays, 20 yards, 2:40; Tied 24–24)
- (4:36) MIZ – Blake Craig 56–yard field goal (Drive: 9 plays, 39 yards, 3:21; Missouri 27–24)

These two programs haven't played since the 2010 Insight Bowl. They were scheduled to play in same bowl four years prior but it was cancelled due to COVID-19 complications. This is also the second time Iowa has been invited to this bowl in the last three seasons. Additionally, a victory would have had Kirk Ferentz tied with Woody Hayes in Big Ten career wins. Costly mistakes hurt the Hawkeyes throughout the game.

Statistics	IOWA	MIZZ
First downs	18	23
Total yards	56–297	66–376
Rushing yards	38–166	33–89
Passing yards	131	287
Passing: Comp–Att–Int	14–18–1	18–33–0
Time of possession	28:30	31:30

Team	Category	Player	Statistics
Iowa	Passing	Brendan Sullivan	14/18, 131 yards, TD, INT
Iowa	Rushing	Kamari Moulton	14 carries, 96 yards, TD
Iowa	Receiving	Jarriett Buie	3 receptions, 30 yards
Missouri	Passing	Brady Cook	18/32, 287 yards, 2 TD
Missouri	Rushing	Brady Cook	14 carries, 54 yards
Missouri	Receiving	Marquis Johnson	7 receptions, 122 yards, TD

== Roster ==
2024 Iowa Hawkeyes football team roster
Players
Coaches
Offense

Pos.	#	Name	Class
QB	11	Marco Lainez	Fr
QB	12	Cade McNamara	GS
QB	10	James Resar	Fr
QB	19	Jackson Stratton	So
QB	1	Brendan Sullivan	Jr
RB	23	Brevin Doll	Fr
RB	27	Grant Glausser	Fr
RB	2	Kaleb Johnson	Jr
RB	28	Kamari Moulton	Fr
RB	9	Jaziun Patterson	So
RB	8	Terrell Washington Jr.	Fr
RB	22	Max White	Jr
RB	4	Leshon Williams	Sr
RB	26	Xavier Williams	Fr
FB	88	Hayden Large	GS
FB	31	Eli Miller	Jr
FB	41	Rusty VanWetzinga	Fr
WR	6	Seth Anderson	Jr
WR	3	Kaleb Brown	Jr
WR	0	Jarriett Buie	Fr
WR	17	Alex Eichmann	So
WR	16	Graham Friedrichsen	So
WR	5	Jacob Gill	Jr
WR	7	Dayton Howard	Fr
WR	29	Judah Mallette	Fr
WR	14	Alex Mota	Fr
WR	13	Reese Osgood	So
WR	84	KJ Parker	Fr
WR	25	Ayden Price	Fr
WR	15	Reece Vander Zee	Fr
WR	21	Kaden Wetjen	Sr
WR	18	Alec Wick	Jr
TE	80	Michael Burt	Fr
TE	89	Gavin Hoffman	Fr
TE	85	Luke Lachey	Sr
TE	44	Grant Leeper	Fr
TE	49	Andrew Lentsch	Jr
TE	83	Cole Marsh	Fr
TE	48	Zach Ortwerth	So
TE	87	Addison Ostrenga	Jr
TE	82	Johnny Pascuzzi	Jr
TE	40	Jalyn Thompson	Fr
TE	73	Kyson Van Vugt	So
TE	81	DJ Vonnahme	Fr
OL	69	Cade Borud	So
OL	66	Jeremy Chaplin	Jr
OL	77	Connor Colby	Sr
OL	56	Nick DeJong	GS
OL	71	Jack Dotzler	So
OL	67	Gennings Dunker	Jr
OL	76	Tyler Elsbury	Sr
OL	79	Cody Fox	Fr
OL	63	Josh Janowski	Fr
OL	64	Leighton Jones	Fr
OL	65	Logan Jones	Sr
OL	52	Mason Knipp	Fr
OL	72	Kale Krogh	So
OL	59	Trevor Lauck	Fr
OL	75	Cannon Leonard	Fr
OL	74	Bodey McCaslin	Fr
OL	53	Michael Myslinski	Jr
OL	68	Will Nolan	Fr
OL	58	Kade Pieper	Fr
OL	78	Mason Richman	Sr
OL	70	Beau Stephens	Jr
OL	73	Kyson Van Vugt	So
OL	61	Cael Winter	Fr

Defense

Pos.	#	Name	Class
DE	54	Ethan Aghakhan	Fr
DE	90	Brian Allen	So
DE	84	Joseph Anderson	Fr
DE	13	Drew Campbell	Fr
DE	40	Chima Chineke	Fr
DL	94	Yahya Black	Sr
DL	56	Maddux Borcherding-Johnson	Fr
DL	86	Jeff Bowie	Jr
DL	91	Chase Brackney	Fr
DL	45	Deontae Craig	Sr
DL	97	Caden Crawford	So
DL	51	Luke Gaffney	So
DL	95	Aaron Graves	Jr
DL	57	Will Hubert	So
DL	49	Ethan Hurkett	Sr
DL	99	Devan Kennedy	Fr
DL	50	Ryan Kuennen	Fr
DL	48	Max Llewellyn	Jr
DL	44	Kenneth Merrieweather	Fr
DL	55	Jeremiah Pittman	Jr
DT	53	Trent Cakerice	Fr
LB	33	Cam Buffington	Fr
LB	31	Nolan DeLong	Fr
LB	38	Graham Eben	Fr
LB	39	Eric Epenesa	Jr
LB	37	Kyler Fisher	GS
LB	41	Jaden Harrell	Jr
LB	34	Jay Higgins	Sr
LB	10	Nick Jackson	GS
LB	47	Jack Laughlin	Fr
LB	36	Jayden Montgomery	So
LB	12	Jaxon Rexroth	Jr
LB	46	Preston Ries	Fr
LB	43	Karson Sharar	Jr
LB	25	Kelby Telander	Jr
LB	42	Zach Twedt	Jr
LB	23	Landyn Van Kekerix	So
LB	35	Devan Van Ness	Fr
LB	22	Derek Weisskopf	Fr
DB	15	Amare Bickham	Fr
DB	29	Sebastian Castro	GS
DB	5	Teegan Davis	Fr
DB	4	Koen Entringer	So
DB	19	Kyler Gerardy	Fr
DB	17	Rashad Godfrey Jr.	Fr
DB	2	TJ Hall	Jr
CB	27	Jermari Harris	GS
DB	16	Jamison Heinz	Sr
DB	20	Deavin Hilson	Jr
DB	26	Kael Kolarik	So
DB	11	Drew Larson	Fr
DB	8	Deshaun Lee	So
DB	6	Zach Lutmer	Fr
DB	21	Watts McBride	Fr
DB	7	John Nestor	So
DB	1	Xavier Nwankpa	Jr
DB	3	Jaylen Watson	Fr
DB	14	Kahlil Tate	Fr
DB	30	Quinn Schulte	GS

Special teams

Pos.	#	Name	Class
K	18	Drew Stevens	Jr
K	92	Tripp Woody	Fr
P	9	Rhys Dakin	Fr
P	99	Ty Nissen	Sr
LS	39	Luke Elkin	Sr
LS	97	Ike Speltz	Fr

Head coach

- Kirk Ferentz

Coordinators/assistant coaches

- Seth Wallace – Assistant head coach/Assistant defensive coordinator/linebackers
- Tim Lester – Offensive coordinator
- Phil Parker – Defensive coordinator/secondary
- LeVar Woods – Special teams coordinator
- George Barnett Offensive line
- Kelvin Bell – Defensive line
- Ladell Betts – Running backs
- Jon Budmayr – Wide receivers
- Abdul Hodge – Tight ends/fullbacks
- Jay Niemann – Assistant defensive line/defensive recruiting coordinator
- Raimond Braithwaite – Director, strength and conditioning
- Tyler Barnes – Chief of Staff/General Manager
- Paul Federici – Director, Football Operations

Legend

- (C) Team captain
- (S) Suspended
- (I) Ineligible
- Injured
- Redshirt

Roster
Last update: August 25, 2024

== Awards and honors ==
Individual Awards
Player/Coach	Award	Ref.
Jay Higgins	Butkus–Fitzgerald Linebacker of the Year; Unanimous All-American	
Kaleb Johnson	Ameche–Dayne Running Back of the Year; Consensus All-American	
Kaden Wetjen	Rodgers–Dwight Return Specialist of the Year; Jet Award	

== Players drafted into the NFL ==
Round	Pick	Player	Position	NFL Club
3	83	Kaleb Johnson	RB	Pittsburgh Steelers
5	164	Yahya Black	DT	Pittsburgh Steelers
7	234	Mason Richman	OT	Seattle Seahawks
7	249	Connor Colby	OG	San Francisco 49ers
7	255	Luke Lachey	TE	Houston Texans
