= Jet Award =

American college football award

- Awarded for: the top return specialist in college football
- Country: United States

History
- First award: 2011
- Most recent: Kaden Wetjen, Iowa
- Website: https://thejetaward.com/

The Jet Award, named in honor of 1972 Heisman Trophy winner Johnny "the Jet" Rodgers, is awarded to the top return specialist in college football beginning with the 2011 season. Joe Adams was announced as the first winner on March 29, 2012. Beginning with the 2012 award ceremony, in addition to being given to the annual award winner, the Rodgers Award will be presented retroactively one decade at a time, starting with the 1959–1969 winners.

== Winners ==
Year	Winner	School	Ref.
2011	Joe Adams	Arkansas	
2012	Tavon Austin	West Virginia	
2013	Ty Montgomery	Stanford	
2014	Tyler Lockett	Kansas State	
2015	Christian McCaffrey	Stanford	
2016	Adoree' Jackson	USC	
2017	Dante Pettis	Washington	
2018	Savon Scarver	Utah State	
2019	Joe Reed	Virginia	
2020	Avery Williams	Boise State	
2021	Marcus Jones	Houston	
2022	Derius Davis	TCU	
2023	Zachariah Branch	USC	
2024	Kaden Wetjen	Iowa	
2025	Kaden Wetjen (2)	Iowa	

== Legacy winners ==
Year	Winner	School
1959	Billy Cannon	LSU
1960	Pat Fischer	Nebraska
1961	Paul Allen	BYU
1965	Mike Garrett	USC
1970	Joe Washington	Oklahoma
1971	Cliff Branch	Colorado
1972	Terry Metcalf	Long Beach State
1974	Rick Upchurch	Minnesota
1975	Billy "White Shoes" Johnson	Widener
1983	Mel Gray	Purdue
1985	Erroll Tucker	Utah
1997	Tim Dwight	Iowa
1999	Dante Hall	Texas A&M
2000	Aaron Lockett	Kansas State
2002	DeJuan Groce	Nebraska
2006	Ted Ginn Jr.	Ohio State
