= 2024 All-America college football team =

College football honors

The 2024 All-America college football team includes those players of American college football who have been honored by various selector organizations as the best players at their respective positions. The selector organizations award the "All-America" honor annually following the conclusion of the fall college football season. The original All-America team was the 1889 All-America college football team selected by Caspar Whitney. The National Collegiate Athletic Bureau, which is the National Collegiate Athletic Association's (NCAA) service bureau, compiled in the 1950s the first list of All-Americans, including first-team selections on teams created for a national audience. Since 1957, College Sports Communicators (CSC) has bestowed Academic All-American recognition on male and female athletes in Divisions I, II, and III of the NCAA, as well as NAIA and NJCAA athletes.

The 2024 All-America college football team is composed of the following All-America college football first teams chosen by the following selector organizations: Associated Press (AP), Football Writers Association of America (FWAA), American Football Coaches Association (AFCA), Walter Camp Football Foundation (WCFF), Sporting News (TSN, from its historic name of The Sporting News), Sports Illustrated (SI), The Athletic (Athletic), USA Today (USAT), ESPN, CBS Sports (CBS), College Football News (CFN), Athlon Sports, and Phil Steele.

Currently, the NCAA compiles consensus All-America teams in the sports of Division I FBS football and Division I men's basketball using a point system computed from All-America teams named by coaches associations or media sources. In football, the teams are compiled by position, and the player accumulating the most points at each position is named a first-team consensus All-American. If there is a tie at a position for first team, then the players who are tied shall be named to the team. Players named first-team by all five selectors are deemed unanimous All-Americans. Currently, the NCAA recognizes All-Americans selected by the AP, AFCA, FWAA, TSN and the WCFF to determine consensus and unanimous All-Americans.

The following players were recognized as consensus All-Americans for 2024. Unanimous selections are followed by an asterisk (*).

2024 Consensus All-Americans
Name	Position	Year	University
Cam Ward	Quarterback	Senior	Miami (FL)
Ashton Jeanty*	Running back	Junior	Boise State
Kaleb Johnson	Running back	Junior	Iowa
Tetairoa McMillan	Wide receiver	Junior	Arizona
Nick Nash*	Wide receiver	Senior	San Jose State
Xavier Restrepo	Wide receiver	Senior	Miami (FL)
Harold Fannin Jr.	Tight end	Junior	Bowling Green
Kelvin Banks*	Offensive line	Junior	Texas
Will Campbell	Offensive line	Junior	LSU
Seth McLaughlin	Offensive line	Senior	Ohio State
Wyatt Milum	Offensive line	Senior	West Virginia
Addison West	Offensive line	Senior	Western Michigan
Donovan Ezeiruaku	Defensive line	Senior	Boston College
Kyle Kennard	Defensive line	Senior	South Carolina
Abdul Carter*	Defensive line	Junior	Penn State
Mason Graham*	Defensive line	Junior	Michigan
Walter Nolen	Defensive line	Junior	Ole Miss
Shaun Dolac	Linebacker	Senior	Buffalo
Jay Higgins*	Linebacker	Senior	Iowa
Danny Stutsman	Linebacker	Senior	Oklahoma
Jahdae Barron	Defensive back	Senior	Texas
Xavier Watts	Defensive back	Senior	Notre Dame
Nohl Williams	Defensive back	Senior	California
Caleb Downs*	Defensive back	Sophomore	Ohio State
Kenneth Almendares	Kicker	Senior	Louisiana
Alex Mastromanno	Punter	Senior	Florida State
Travis Hunter*	All-purpose, return specialist	Junior	Colorado

== Offense ==
=== Quarterback ===
- Cam Ward, Miami (FL) (AFCA, AP, TSN, WCFF, CBS, Athletic, ESPN, PFF)
- Dillon Gabriel, Oregon (FWAA, USAT, SI)

=== Running back ===
- Ashton Jeanty, Boise State (AFCA, AP, FWAA, TSN, WCFF, CBS, Athletic, PFF, USAT, ESPN, SI)
- Kaleb Johnson, Iowa (WCFF, FWAA, TSN, USAT)
- Cam Skattebo, Arizona State (AP, CBS, Athletic, ESPN, SI)
- Omarion Hampton, North Carolina (AFCA)

=== Wide receiver ===
- Nick Nash, San Jose State (AFCA, AP, FWAA, WCFF, TSN CBS, ESPN, PFF)
- Tetairoa McMillan, Arizona (AFCA, AP, CBS, Athletic, PFF, USAT)
- Xavier Restrepo, Miami (FL) (AFCA, AP, Athletic, SI)
- Travis Hunter, Colorado (TSN, WCFF, CBS, SI)
- Harold Fannin Jr., Bowling Green (FWAA)
- Jeremiah Smith, Ohio State (USAT, ESPN)

=== Tight end ===
- Harold Fannin Jr., Bowling Green (AFCA, AP, WCFF, PFF, USAT, SI)
- Tyler Warren, Penn State (TSN, FWAA, CBS, ESPN, Athletic)

=== Offensive line ===
- Kelvin Banks, Texas (AFCA, AP, FWAA, TSN, WCFF, CBS, Athletic, PFF, USAT, ESPN, SI)
- Wyatt Milum, West Virginia (AFCA, FWAA, TSN, WCFF, CBS, Athletic, SI)
- Will Campbell, LSU (AFCA, AP, FWAA, WCFF, CBS, Athletic, ESPN, USAT)
- Addison West, Western Michigan (AP, FWAA, WCFF, PFF)
- Willie Lampkin, North Carolina (AP, TSN)
- Donovan Jackson, Ohio State (TSN, USAT, ESPN, SI)
- Tate Ratledge, Georgia (AFCA)
- Tyler Booker, Alabama (CBS, ESPN, USAT)
- Josh Conerly Jr., Oregon (Athletic)
- Dylan Fairchild, Georgia (PFF)
- Spencer Fano, Utah (PFF)
- Bill Katsigiannis, Army (SI)

=== Center ===
- Seth McLaughlin, Ohio State (AFCA, FWAA, WCFF, CBS, Athletic)
- Jake Slaughter, Florida (AP, ESPN, PFF)
- Cooper Mays, Tennessee (TSN, USAT, SI)

== Defense ==
=== Defensive line ===
- Abdul Carter, Penn State (AFCA, AP, FWAA, TSN, WCFF, CBS, Athletic, PFF, USAT, ESPN, SI)
- Mason Graham, Michigan (AFCA, AP, FWAA, TSN, WCFF, CBS, Athletic, PFF, USAT, ESPN, SI)
- Kyle Kennard, South Carolina (AFCA, FWAA, WCFF, Athletic, USAT, SI)
- Walter Nolen, Ole Miss (AP, FWAA, TSN, Athletic, PFF, USAT, ESPN, SI)
- Donovan Ezeiruaku, Boston College (AFCA, AP, TSN, CBS, ESPN, PFF)
- Mike Green, Marshall (WCFF)

=== Linebacker ===
- Jay Higgins, Iowa (AFCA, AP, FWAA, TSN, WCFF, CBS, Athletic, PFF, USAT, SI)
- Shaun Dolac, Buffalo (AP, FWAA, TSN, WCFF, CBS, Athletic, ESPN, PFF)
- Danny Stutsman, Oklahoma (AFCA, WCFF, CBS)
- Jalon Walker, Georgia (AFCA, USAT, ESPN, SI)
- Carson Schwesinger, UCLA (AP)
- Aiden Fisher, Indiana (FWAA)
- Kyle Louis, Pitt (TSN)
- Anthony Hill Jr., Texas (Athletic, ESPN, SI)
- Chris Paul Jr., Ole Miss (USAT)

=== Defensive back ===
- Caleb Downs, Ohio State (AFCA, AP, FWAA, TSN, WCFF, CBS, Athletic, USAT, ESPN, SI)
- Xavier Watts, Notre Dame (AFCA, AP, TSN, WCFF, CBS, Athletic, PFF, USAT, ESPN, SI)
- Nohl Williams, California (AFCA, FWAA, TSN, WCFF, Athletic, ESPN, SI)
- Jahdae Barron, Texas (AP, FWAA, TSN, CBS, Athletic, PFF, ESPN, USAT)
- Travis Hunter, Colorado (AP, WCFF, CBS, PFF, USAT, SI)
- Malaki Starks, Georgia (AFCA, FWAA, CBS)
- Nick Emmanwori, South Carolina (AP, TSN)
- Michael Taaffe, Texas (PFF)
- Malachi Moore, Alabama (PFF)

== Special teams ==
=== Kicker ===
- Kenneth Almendares, Louisiana (AP, WCFF, CBS, USAT)
- Dominic Zvada, Michigan (TSN, ESPN, Athletic)
- Ryan Fitzgerald, Florida State (AFCA)
- Collin Rogers, SMU (FWAA, SI)
- Ben Sauls, Pittsburgh (PFF)

=== Punter ===
- Alex Mastromanno, Florida State (AFCA, AP, FWAA, WCFF, CBS, USAT)
- Eddie Czaplicki, USC (TSN, ESPN, Athletic)
- Brett Thorson, Georgia, (PFF, SI)

=== All-purpose / return specialist ===
- Travis Hunter, Colorado (AFCA, AP, FWAA, CBS, Athletic, ESPN, USAT)
- Keelan Marion, BYU (FWAA, WCFF, CBS, PFF, USAT)
- Kam Shanks, UAB (TSN, ESPN, CBS)
- Cam Skattebo, Arizona State (TSN)
- Kaden Wetjen, Iowa (FWAA)
- Rayshawn Pleasant, Tulane (TSN)
- Tyler Warren, Penn State (SI)
- Dalen Cambre, Louisiana (PFF)

=== Long snapper ===
- Luke Elkin, Iowa (AFCA)
- Bryce Robinson, Kennesaw State (PFF)

== See also ==
- 2024 FCS College Football All-America Team
- 2024 All-Big 12 Conference football team
- 2024 All-Big Ten Conference football team
- 2024 All-SEC football team
- 2024 All-ACC football team
