= Kaden Wetjen =

American football player (born 2002)

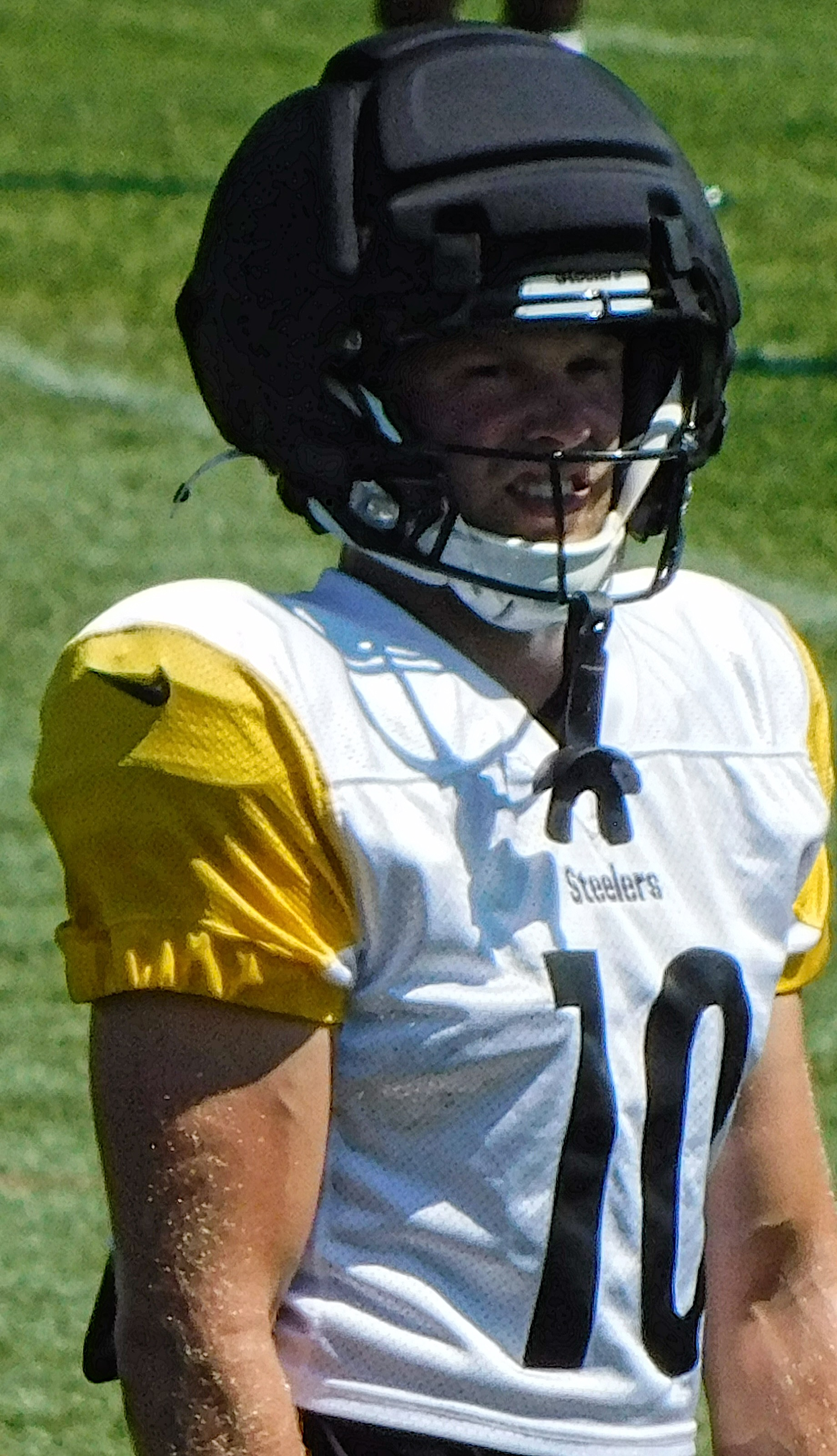
- Wetjen with the Pittsburgh Steelers in 2026

No. 10 – Pittsburgh Steelers
- Positions: Wide receiver, return specialist
- Roster status: Active

Personal information
- Born: March 9, 2002 (age 24); Iowa City, Iowa, U.S.
- Listed height: 5 ft 9 in (1.75 m)
- Listed weight: 193 lb (88 kg)

Career information
- High school: Williamsburg (Williamsburg, Iowa)
- College: Iowa Western (2020–2021); Iowa (2022–2025)
- NFL draft: 2026: 4th round, 121st overall pick

Career history
- Pittsburgh Steelers (2026–present)

Awards and highlights
- Consensus All-American (2025); First-team All-American (2024); 2× Jet Award (2024, 2025); 2× Big Ten Return Specialist of the Year (2024, 2025); 2× First-team All-Big Ten (2024, 2025)

Career NFL statistics as of Week 10, 2026
- Return yards: 887
- Stats at Pro Football Reference

Kaden Derek Wetjen (WEE-gihn; born March 9, 2002) is an American professional football wide receiver and return specialist for the Pittsburgh Steelers of the National Football League (NFL). He played college football for the Iowa Western Reivers and the Iowa Hawkeyes. He was selected by the Steelers in the fourth round of the 2026 NFL draft.

== Early life ==
Wetjen was born on March 9, 2002, in Iowa City, Iowa. He was raised alongside his brothers Grady and Braylon by parents Lee and Lindsay Wetjen. His father, Lee, was a standout running back for Williamsburg High School, and would later coach Kaden in football. Like his father, Kaden would go on to attend Williamsburg High School, where he ran track and was a three-year football letterman as a running back, wide receiver and defensive back. As a senior, he scored 31 touchdowns and had six interceptions on defense. He also earned first-team all-state honors.

== College career ==
After graduating from high school, Wetjen attended Iowa Western Community College where he continued to play football as a wide receiver. After two seasons at Iowa Western, Wetjen entered the transfer portal. He eventually opted to walk-on at Iowa over offers at several smaller schools.

During his first season with the Hawkeyes, he didn't appear in a game. The next season, Wetjen led Iowa in kickoff-return yardage and took over punt return duties after a season-ending injury to Cooper DeJean.

After the 2024 season, Wetjen was named the winner of the Jet Award as the nation's top return specialist. He was recognized after leading the FBS in kickoff return yards and coming second in punt return yards, including a 100-yard kickoff return touchdown and an 85-yard punt return touchdown.

Prior to the 2025 season, Wetjen was placed on scholarship by the Hawkeyes.

In 2025, during his final season at Iowa, Wetjen had one kickoff return for a touchdown and three punt return touchdowns to break Tim Dwight's school record for return touchdowns in a career (6). He was named Big Ten Special Team Player of the Week three times. After the regular season, Wetjen was named First-team All-Big Ten and Rodgers–Dwight Return Specialist of the Year for the second time. He also earned Consensus First-team All-American honors and was again named the recipient of the Jet Award, becoming its first repeat winner.

=== Statistics ===
Legend
	Led NCAA Division I FBS
	Led Big Ten Conference
**Bold**	Career high

Year	Team	Games		Receiving				Rushing				Kick returns				Punt returns			
Year	Team	GP	GS	Rec	Yds	Avg	TD	Att	Yds	Avg	TD	Ret	Yds	Avg	TD	Ret	Yds	Avg	TD
2020–21	Iowa Western	7	-	4	144	**36.0**	**2**	2	9	4.5	0	3	72	24.0	0	26	416	16.0	2
2021	Iowa Western	11	-	18	**304**	16.9	1	5	60	**12.0**	0	7	129	18.4	0	**31**	459	14.8	2
2022	Iowa	0	0	Redshirt															
2023	Iowa	**14**	0	—	—	—	—	4	20	5.0	0	14	335	23.9	0	7	63	9.0	0
2024	Iowa	13	1	3	46	15.3	0	4	33	8.3	0	**26**	**727**	28.0	**1**	26	328	12.6	1
2025	Iowa	13	**6**	**20**	151	7.6	1	**15**	**79**	5.3	**2**	16	476	**29.8**	**1**	21	**563**	**26.8**	**3**
NJCAA career		18	-	22	448	20.4	3	7	69	9.9	0	10	201	20.1	0	57	875	15.4	4
FBS career		40	7	23	197	8.6	1	23	132	5.7	2	56	1,538	27.5	2	54	954	17.7	4

== Professional career ==
Pre-draft measurables
Height	Weight	Arm length	Hand span	Wingspan	40-yard dash	10-yard split	20-yard split	20-yard shuttle	Three-cone drill	Vertical jump
5 ft 9 3/8 in (1.76 m)	193 lb (88 kg)	29 5/8 in (0.75 m)	8 1/2 in (0.22 m)	5 ft 11 5/8 in (1.82 m)	4.47 s	1.58 s	2.60 s	4.44 s	6.95 s	35.5 in (0.90 m)
All values from NFL Combine

Wetjen was selected by the Pittsburgh Steelers in the fourth round with the 121st overall pick in the 2026 NFL draft.

Danny Crossman, the Steelers' special teams coordinator, credited Wetjen for making good decisions and having good ball security. He referenced recent changes to dynamic kickoff rules in the NFL, which shortened the distance between the kicking and receiving team from 15 yards apart to 5.

== Personal life ==
As of April 2026, Wetjen is dating Rachel Bierman.

Wetjen has a bachelor's degree in enterprise leadership.
