= Nic McKissic-Luke =

American football coach (born 1983)

New York Jets
- Title: Running backs coach

Personal information
- Born: December 12, 1983 (age 42); Phenix City, Alabama, U.S.
- Listed height: 6 ft 1 in (1.85 m)
- Listed weight: 220 lb (100 kg)

Career information
- High school: Central (AL)
- College: Alabama (2002-2003); Alabama A&M (2004-2006)

Career history
- Benedict College (2008–2012) Running backs coach, slot receivers coach & strength and conditioning coach; South Dakota State (2013–2015) Running backs coach & co-special teams coordinator; Youngstown State (2016–2018) Running backs coach; Youngstown State (2019) Running backs coach & special teams coordinator; Northern Illinois (2020) Running backs coach & fullbacks coach; Northern Illinois (2021) Run game coordinator & co-special teams coordinator; Northern Illinois (2022) Run game coordinator & special teams coordinator; Minnesota (2023–2024) Running backs coach; New York Jets (2025–present) Running backs coach

Awards and highlights
- 2023 Quick Lane Bowl champion

Nic McKissic-Luke (born December 12, 1983) is an American football coach who serves as the running backs coach for the New York Jets of the National Football League (NFL). He played college football as a running back for Alabama and Alabama A&M. Before joining the Jets coaching staff in 2025, he held running backs coaching positions at several college programs, including Minnesota, Northern Illinois, Youngstown State, South Dakota State, and Benedict College.

== Early life and playing career ==
Pre-draft measurables
Height	Weight	40-yard dash	10-yard split	20-yard split	20-yard shuttle	Three-cone drill	Vertical jump	Broad jump	Bench press
6 ft 0 5/8 in (1.84 m)	220 lb (100 kg)	4.84 s	1.65 s	2.83 s	4.48 s	7.52 s	31.0 in (0.79 m)	9 ft 6 in (2.90 m)	20 reps
All values from Pro Day

McKissic-Luke was born in Phenix City, Alabama, and attended Central High School. He played college football at the University of Alabama from 2002 to 2003 before transferring to Alabama A&M University, where he played running back from 2004 to 2006. He finished second in career rushing yards at Alabama A&M history and helped the team win the Southwestern Athletic Conference (SWAC) title in 2006. He graduated in 2007.

== Coaching career ==
=== College coaching ===
McKissic-Luke began his coaching career in 2008 at Benedict College, where he spent five seasons coaching running backs and slot receivers while also overseeing strength and conditioning. In 2009 and 2010, the Benedict Tigers led the Southern Intercollegiate Athletic Conference (SIAC) in rushing.

From 2013 to 2015, he coached at South Dakota State, where he mentored running back Zach Zenner, who later played in the NFL. During his tenure, the Jackrabbits qualified for the FCS Playoffs in each season.

He joined Youngstown State in 2016 as running backs coach and assumed special teams coordinator duties in 2019.

McKissic-Luke later joined Northern Illinois, serving as running backs coach, run game coordinator, and special teams coordinator. In 2021, the team averaged more than 240 rushing yards per game and won the Mid-American Conference (MAC) West Division title. His running backs earned multiple All-MAC honors.

In 2023, he was hired as running backs coach at the University of Minnesota. He coached Darius Taylor, who was named All-Big Ten Honorable Mention and set the school record for rushing yards by a true freshman.

=== NFL coaching ===
In 2025, McKissic-Luke was hired by the New York Jets as running backs coach, marking his first NFL coaching position.

== Personal life ==
McKissic-Luke is engaged to Emily Wollet and has three children: a son, Nicolas, and two daughters, Georgia and Rylynn. He participated in the NFL's Bill Walsh Minority Coaching Fellowship with the Arizona Cardinals in 2011 and 2012.
