= Kaleb Johnson (running back) =

American football player (born 2003)

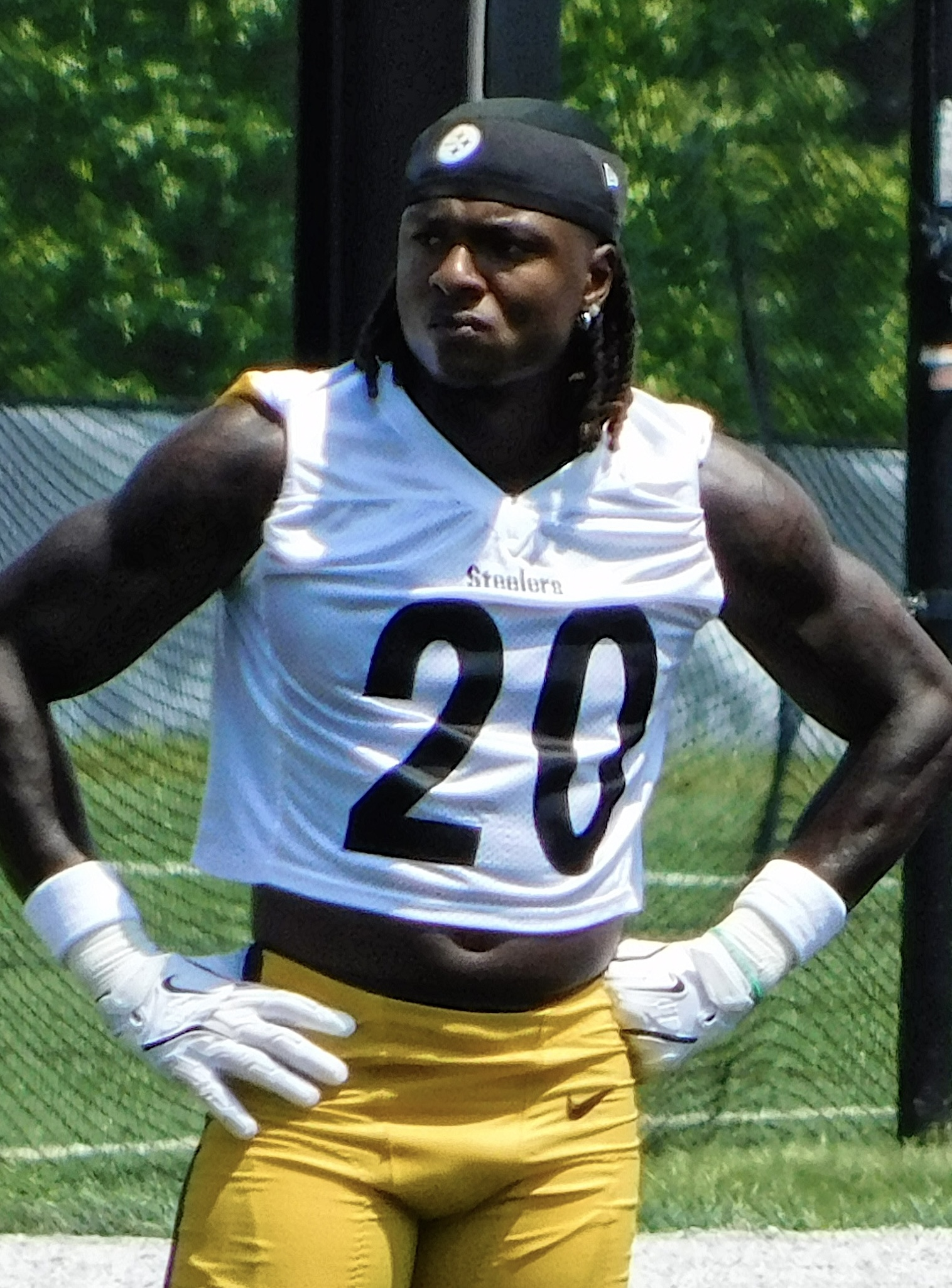
- Johnson with the Pittsburgh Steelers in 2025

No. 26 – Green Bay Packers
- Position: Running back
- Roster status: Active

Personal information
- Born: August 14, 2003 (age 23); Cincinnati, Ohio, U.S.
- Listed height: 6 ft 1 in (1.85 m)
- Listed weight: 224 lb (102 kg)

Career information
- High school: Hamilton (Hamilton, Ohio)
- College: Iowa (2022–2024)
- NFL draft: 2025: 3rd round, 83rd overall pick

Career history
- Pittsburgh Steelers (2025); Green Bay Packers (2026–present)

Awards and highlights
- Consensus All-American (2024); Big Ten Running Back of the Year (2024); First-team All-Big Ten (2024)

Career NFL statistics as of Week 10, 2026
- Rushing yards: 283
- Rushing average: 3.5
- Rushing touchdowns: 1
- Receptions: 2
- Receiving yards: 19
- Return yards: 242
- Stats at Pro Football Reference

Kaleb Johnson (born August 14, 2003) is an American professional football running back for the Green Bay Packers of the National Football League (NFL). He played college football for the Iowa Hawkeyes and was selected by the Pittsburgh Steelers in the third round of the 2025 NFL draft.

== Early life ==
Johnson attended Hamilton High School in Hamilton, Ohio. He was rated as a three-star recruit and the 36th overall running back in the class of 2022, receiving offers from schools such as California, Cincinnati, Michigan, Michigan State, Pitt, Kentucky, Minnesota, Iowa, West Virginia, Ball State, Kent State, Liberty, Marshall, Miami University, Toledo, Western Michigan, and Eastern Kentucky. Initially, Johnson committed to play college football for the California Golden Bears. However, Johnson decided to flip his commitment to play for the Iowa Hawkeyes.

== College career ==
In his first two seasons at the University of Iowa in 2022 and 2023, Johnson rushed 268 times for 1,242 yards and nine touchdowns and hauled in seven receptions for 52 yards. In the 2024 season opener, he rushed for 119 yards and two touchdowns on 11 carries despite being suspended for the first half of the game, helping the Hawkeyes to a win over Illinois State.

Through week 14 of the 2024 NCAA Division I FBS football season, Johnson was fourth in the FBS in rushing yards (1,537) and scoring (23 touchdowns, 138 points), and fifth in rushing touchdowns (21). After the conclusion of the regular season, Johnson was named first-team all-Big Ten and Big Ten Running Back of the Year, and a consensus first-team All-American. He was also a finalist for the Doak Walker Award. Johnson established single-season records at Iowa for rushing touchdowns and scoring.

=== Statistics ===
Year	Team	G	Rushing					Receiving					Kick Return				
Year	Team	G	Att	Yards	Avg	Long	TD	Rec	Yards	Avg	Long	TD	Ret	Yards	Avg	Long	TD
2022	Iowa	13	151	779	5.2	75T	6	4	27	6.8	14	0	13	325	25.0	42	0
2023	Iowa	10	117	463	4.0	67T	3	3	25	8.3	13	0	2	77	38.5	54	0
2024	Iowa	12	240	1,537	6.4	75T	21	22	188	8.5	72T	2	0	0	0.0	–	0
Career		35	508	2,779	5.5	75T	30	29	240	8.3	72T	2	15	402	26.8	54	0

== Professional career ==
Pre-draft measurables
Height	Weight	Arm length	Hand span	Wingspan	40-yard dash	10-yard split	20-yard split
6 ft 1 in (1.85 m)	224 lb (102 kg)	33 in (0.84 m)	9 5/8 in (0.24 m)	6 ft 6 1/2 in (1.99 m)	4.57 s	1.62 s	2.67 s
All values from NFL Combine

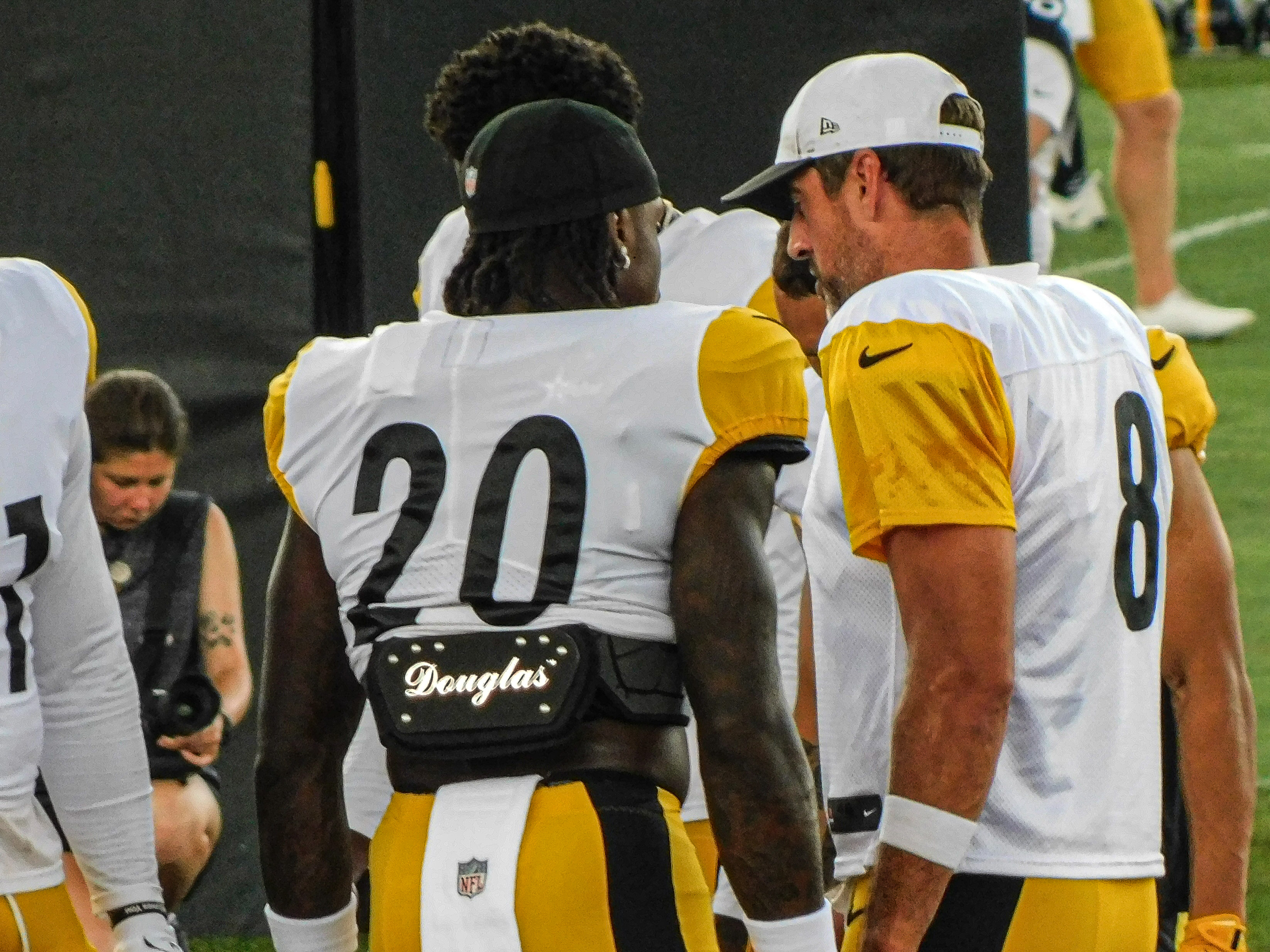
Johnson (20) with quarterback Aaron Rodgers in 2025

=== Pittsburgh Steelers ===
Johnson was selected by the Pittsburgh Steelers with the 83rd pick in the third round of the 2025 NFL draft. In July 2025, Johnson received early praise from head coach Mike Tomlin during training camp with Tomlin stating "He’s come in really in good shape. He’s really engaged. Obviously, he’s got some talent."

On September 14, 2025, in Pittsburgh's game against the Seattle Seahawks, Johnson made an error on a kickoff return that allowed Seattle to recover their own kickoff for a touchdown; after the kickoff bounced over Johnson and into the end zone, Johnson ran toward the sideline, as George Holani recovered the ball for a touchdown. Johnson was subsequently benched ahead of Week 3's win over the New England Patriots, with kick return duties being designated to Kenneth Gainwell. Johnson returned for Week 4's victory over the Minnesota Vikings. Johnson showed considerable improvement following his benching in Week 3. He recorded a combined 12 rushes for 37 yards (3.1 yards per carry) across both games against the Vikings and Cleveland Browns.

=== Green Bay Packers ===
On August 30, 2026, the Steelers traded Johnson to the Green Bay Packers for a 2028 sixth-round pick.

On November 9, 2026, Johnson scored his first career touchdown during a 45-27 blowout of the New England Patriots in Foxborough. He led the Packers on rushing for the day with 68 yards as the team, which through that point in the season was the worst in rushing in the NFL, recorded a season-high 129 yards on the ground.
