= 2024 Big Ten Conference football season =

- League: NCAA Division I Football Bowl Subdivision
- Sport: Football
- Duration: August 24, 2024 through January 1, 2025
- Teams: 18
- TV partner(s): Fox Sports (Fox, FS1, Big Ten Network); CBS Sports (CBS, Paramount+); NBC Sports (NBC, Peacock)

2025 NFL draft
- Top draft pick: Abdul Carter, DE, Penn State
- Picked by: New York Giants, 3rd overall

Regular season

Championship Game
- Date: December 7, 2024
- Venue: Lucas Oil Stadium, Indianapolis, Indiana
- Champions: Oregon
- Runners-up: Penn State
- Finals MVP: Tez Johnson, WR, Oregon

Football seasons
- 2023 2025

2024 Big Ten Conference football standings
	Conf.			Overall
Team	W		L	W		L
No. 3 Oregon y$^	9	–	0	13	–	1
No. 10 Indiana ^	8	–	1	11	–	2
No. 5 Penn State y^	8	–	1	13	–	3
No. 1 Ohio State #^	7	–	2	14	–	2
No. 16 Illinois	6	–	3	10	–	3
Iowa	6	–	3	8	–	5
Michigan	5	–	4	8	–	5
Minnesota	5	–	4	8	–	5
USC	4	–	5	7	–	6
Rutgers	4	–	5	7	–	6
Washington	4	–	5	6	–	7
Nebraska	3	–	6	7	–	6
UCLA	3	–	6	5	–	7
Wisconsin	3	–	6	5	–	7
Northwestern	2	–	7	4	–	8
Maryland	1	–	8	4	–	8
Michigan State†	0	–	6	0	–	7
Purdue	0	–	9	1	–	11
Championship: Oregon 45, Penn State 37
# – College Football Playoff champion; ^ – College Football Playoff participant; $ – Conference champion; y – Championship game participant; † — NCAA vacated all wins for Michigan State (5–7, 3–6); Rankings from AP Poll

The 2024 Big Ten Conference football season was the 129th season of college football play for the Big Ten Conference and part of the 2024 NCAA Division I FBS football season. This was the Big Ten's first season with 18 teams with the additions of UCLA, USC, Oregon, and Washington, and its first season since 2010 with a non-divisional scheduling format.

== Coaching changes ==
The Big Ten saw six head coaching changes for the 2024 season.

On July 10, 2023, Northwestern announced it was parting ways with head coach Pat Fitzgerald after allegations surrounding hazing within the Wildcat football program. On July 14, 2023, Northwestern named defensive coordinator David Braun the interim coach for the 2023 season, and named him the permanent head coach on November 15, 2023.

On September 10, 2023, Michigan State coach Mel Tucker was suspended as part of an investigation into a sexual harassment claim. Secondary coach Harlon Barnett served as interim coach while the case was being sorted out during the 2023 season. Tucker was officially fired on September 27. On November 25, 2023, Michigan State hired Oregon State head coach Jonathan Smith as its next head coach.

On November 26, 2023, Indiana fired Tom Allen after the Hoosiers completed a third consecutive losing season. Indiana hired Curt Cignetti as its new head coach, having previously served as head coach at James Madison.

In January 2024, Kalen DeBoer left Washington to replace the retiring Nick Saban at Alabama, and was replaced by Jedd Fisch, previously head coach at Arizona.

On January 24, 2024, Jim Harbaugh left the Michigan Wolverines to return to the NFL with the Los Angeles Chargers. Two days later, Michigan elevated its offensive coordinator Sherrone Moore, who had served as acting head coach for four games in 2023 from which Harbaugh had been suspended, as Harbaugh's successor.

On February 9, 2024, Chip Kelly announced his resignation as head coach at UCLA to become the offensive coordinator at Ohio State. On February 12, UCLA announced the hiring of DeShaun Foster as its next head coach.

== Preseason ==
=== Recruiting classes ===
Rankings
Team	Rivals	Scout & 24/7	On3 Recruits	Signees
Illinois	14	15	15	20
Indiana	16	16	16	17
Iowa	10	9	8	21
Maryland	9	12	13	24
Michigan	3	4	4	26
Michigan State	13	13	12	21
Minnesota	12	10	10	21
Nebraska	5	6	7	33
Northwestern	17	17	18	17
Ohio State	1	2	2	22
Oregon	2	1	1	27
Penn State	4	3	3	26
Purdue	8	8	9	27
Rutgers	11	11	11	25
UCLA	18	18	17	10
USC	6	5	5	22
Washington	15	14	14	18
Wisconsin	7	7	6	22

=== Big Ten Media Days ===
==== Preseason Media Poll ====
The annual Cleveland.com Preseason Big Ten Media Poll.

Predicted finish	Team	Points (1st place votes)
1	Ohio State	480 (21)
2	Oregon	448 (6)
3	Penn State	418
4	Michigan	411
5	Iowa	363
6	USC	346
7	Wisconsin	313
8	Nebraska	293
9	Rutgers	249
10	Washington	236
11	Maryland	185
12	Minnesota	183
13	Illinois	145
14	Northwestern	138
15	UCLA	124
16	Michigan State	119
17	Indiana	76
18	Purdue	65

Media poll (Big Ten Championship)
Rank	Team	Votes
1	Ohio State over Oregon	24
2	Oregon over Ohio State	6
3	Ohio State over Penn State	2
4	Ohio State over Michigan	1

Predicted Big Ten Champion
Rank	Team	Votes
1	Ohio State	27
2	Oregon	6

==== Preseason Player of the Year ====
Below are the results of the annual Preseason Big Ten Player of the Year awards conducted by Cleveland.com.

Preseason Offensive Player of the Year
Rank	Player	Position	Team	Points (1st place votes)
1	Dillon Gabriel	QB	Oregon	83 (24)
2	Quinshon Judkins	RB	Ohio State	39 (4)
3	Emeka Egbuka	WR	Ohio State	27 (5)
T4	Will Howard	QB	Ohio State	10 (2)
T4	Kyle Monangai	RB	Rutgers	10 (1)
T4	TreVeyon Henderson	RB	Ohio State	10 (1)
Others	Zachariah Branch	WR	USC	N/A
Others	Miller Moss	QB	USC	N/A
Others	Tez Johnson	WR	Oregon	N/A
Others	Darius Taylor	RB	Minnesota	N/A
Others	Nick Singleton	RB	Penn State	N/A
Others	Drew Allar	QB	Penn State	N/A
Others	Kaytron Allen	RB	Penn State	N/A
Others	Dylan Raiola	QB	Nebraska	N/A
Others	Colston Loveland	TE	Michigan	N/A

Preseason Defensive Player of the Year
Rank	Player	Position	Team	Points (1st place votes)
1	Will Johnson	CB	Michigan	47 (9)
2	Caleb Downs	S	Ohio State	30 (4)
3T	Mason Graham	DT	Michigan	25 (7)
3T	JT Tuimoloau	DE	Ohio State	25 (5)
3T	Jay Higgins	LB	Iowa	25 (3)
6	Abdul Carter	DE	Penn State	17 (2)
Others	Jack Sawyer	DE	Ohio State	N/A
Others	Sebastian Castro	CB	Iowa	N/A
Others	Hunter Wohler	S	Wisconsin	N/A
Others	Denzel Burke	CB	Ohio State	N/A
Others	Jeffrey Bassa	LB	Oregon	N/A
Others	Bear Alexander	DT	USC	N/A
Others	Dillon Thieneman	S	Purdue	N/A

== Rankings ==
		Pre	Wk 1	Wk 2	Wk 3	Wk 4	Wk 5	Wk 6	Wk 7	Wk 8	Wk 9	Wk 10	Wk 11	Wk 12	Wk 13	Wk 14	Final
Illinois	AP			RV	24	19	24	23	22	20			24	22	21	21	16
Illinois	C			RV	RV	21	25	23	21	21			RV	25	21	21	16
Illinois	CFP	Not released											25	23	21	20	
Indiana	AP				RV	RV	23	18	16	13	8	5	5	10	9	9	10
Indiana	C			RV	RV	RV	24	20	18	13	10	6	5	10	9	9	10
Indiana	CFP	Not released									8	5	5	10	9	8	
Iowa	AP	25	21	RV	RV	RV	RV	RV	RV		RV						
Iowa	C	25	21	RV	RV	RV	RV	RV	RV		RV			RV		RV	
Iowa	CFP	Not released															
Maryland	AP																
Maryland	C	RV	RV														
Maryland	CFP	Not released															
Michigan	AP	9	10	17	18	12	10	24	24						RV		RV
Michigan	C	8 (1)	9	16	17	12	10	21	22						RV		RV
Michigan	CFP	Not released															
Michigan State	AP																
Michigan State	C			RV	RV												
Michigan State	CFP	Not released															
Minnesota	AP																
Minnesota	C										RV						
Minnesota	CFP	Not released															
Nebraska	AP	RV	RV	23	22	RV	RV	RV	RV	RV							
Nebraska	C	RV	RV	24	22	RV	RV	RV	25	RV							
Nebraska	CFP	Not released															
Northwestern	AP																
Northwestern	C																
Northwestern	CFP	Not released															
Ohio State	AP	2 (15)	2 (5)	3 (5)	3 (5)	3 (5)	3 (4)	2 (9)	4	4	3	2	2	2	7	6	1 (56)
Ohio State	C	2 (7)	2 (3)	2 (3)	3 (3)	3 (2)	3 (7)	2 (11)	5	4	3	2	2	2	8	7	1 (53)
Ohio State	CFP	Not released									2	2	2	2	6	6	
Oregon	AP	3 (1)	7	9	9	8	6	3	2 (6)	1 (59)	1 (62)	1 (62)	1 (62)	1 (61)	1 (62)	1 (62)	3
Oregon	C	3	6	6	6	7	6	3	2 (2)	1 (51)	1 (53)	1 (55)	1 (55)	1 (55)	1 (53)	1 (54)	4
Oregon	CFP	Not released									1	1	1	1	1	1	
Penn State	AP	8	8	8	10	9	7	4	3	3	6	4	4	4	3	5	5
Penn State	C	9	8	7	8	8	7	5	3	3	7	5	4	4	3	5	5
Penn State	CFP	Not released									6	4	4	4	3	4	
Purdue	AP																
Purdue	C																
Purdue	CFP	Not released															
Rutgers	AP						RV										
Rutgers	C					RV	RV										
Rutgers	CFP	Not released															
UCLA	AP																
UCLA	C																
UCLA	CFP	Not released															
USC	AP	23	13	11	11	12	11	RV									
USC	C	23	14	11	12	16	15	RV									
USC	CFP	Not released															
Washington	AP	RV	RV	RV				RV			RV						
Washington	C	RV	25	22	RV	RV		RV									
Washington	CFP	Not released															
Wisconsin	AP	RV	RV	RV													
Wisconsin	C	RV	RV	RV						RV							
Wisconsin	CFP	Not released															

Legend
	Improvement in ranking
	Drop in ranking
	Not ranked previous week
	No change in ranking from previous week
RV	Received votes but were not ranked in Top 25 of poll
т	Tied with team above or below also with this symbol

== Schedule ==
Index to colors and formatting
Big Ten member won
Big Ten member lost
Big Ten teams in **bold**

=== Regular season schedule ===
==== Week 1 ====
Date	Time	Visiting team	Home team	Site	TV	Result	Attendance	Ref.
August 29	6:00 PM	Howard	**Rutgers**	SHI Stadium • Piscataway, NJ	BTN	**W** 44–7	47,803	
August 29	9:00 PM	North Carolina	**Minnesota**	Huntington Bank Stadium • Minneapolis, MN	FOX	**L** 17–19	50,805	
August 29	9:00 PM	Eastern Illinois	**Illinois**	Memorial Stadium • Champaign, IL	BTN	**W** 45–0	43,849	
August 30	7:00 PM	Florida Atlantic	**Michigan State**	Spartan Stadium • East Lansing, MI	BTN	**W** 16–10	70,271	
August 30	9:00 PM	Western Michigan	**Wisconsin**	Camp Randall Stadium • Madison, WI	FS1	**W** 28–14	75,158	
August 31	12:00 PM	No. 8 **Penn State**	West Virginia	Milan Puskar Stadium • Morgantown, WV	FOX	**W** **PSU** 34–12	62,084	
August 31	12:00 PM	UConn	**Maryland**	SECU Stadium • College Park, MD	FS1	**W** 50–7	35,421	
August 31	12:00 PM	Indiana State	**Purdue**	Ross-Ade Stadium • West Lafayette, IN	BTN	**W** 49–0	59,488	
August 31	12:00 PM	No. 19 (FCS) Illinois State	No. 25 **Iowa**	Kinnick Stadium • Iowa City, IA	BTN	**W** 40–0	69,250	
August 31	3:30 PM	UTEP	**Nebraska**	Memorial Stadium • Lincoln, NE	FOX	**W** 40–7	86,072	
August 31	3:30 PM	Akron	No. 2 **Ohio State**	Ohio Stadium • Columbus, OH	CBS	**W** 52–6	102,011	
August 31	3:30 PM	FIU	**Indiana**	Memorial Stadium • Bloomington, IN	BTN	**W** 31–7	44,150	
August 31	3:30 PM	Miami (OH)	**Northwestern**	Martin Stadium • Evanston, IL	BTN	**W** 13–6	12,023	
August 31	7:30 PM	Fresno State	No. 9 **Michigan**	Michigan Stadium • Ann Arbor, MI	NBC	**W** 30–10	110,665	
August 31	7:30 PM	No. 7 (FCS) Idaho	No. 3 **Oregon**	Autzen Stadium • Eugene, OR	BTN	**W** 24–14	57,435	
August 31	7:30 PM	**UCLA**	Hawaii	Ching Complex • Honolulu, HI	CBS	**W** 16–13	15,194	
August 31	11:00 PM	No. 22 (FCS) Weber State	**Washington**	Husky Stadium • Seattle, WA	BTN	**W** 35–3	66,984	
September 1	7:30 PM	No. 13 LSU	No. 23 **USC**	Allegiant Stadium • Las Vegas, NV (Vegas Kickoff Classic)	ABC	**W** 27–20	63,969	
^{#}Rankings from AP Poll released prior to game. All times are in Eastern Time.

==== Week 2 ====
Date	Time	Visiting team	Home team	Site	TV	Result	Attendance	Ref.
September 6	7:00 PM	Western Illinois	**Indiana**	Memorial Stadium • Bloomington, IN	BTN	**W** 77–3	39,082	
September 6	9:00 PM	Duke	**Northwestern**	Martin Stadium • Evanston, IL	FS1	**L** 20–26 ^{2OT}	11,062	
September 7	12:00 PM	No. 3 Texas	No. 10 **Michigan**	Michigan Stadium • Ann Arbor, MI (Big Noon Kickoff)	FOX	**L** 12–31	111,170	
September 7	12:00 PM	Rhode Island	**Minnesota**	Huntington Bank Stadium • Minneapolis, MN	Peacock	**W** 48–0	41,006	
September 7	12:00 PM	Bowling Green	No. 8 **Penn State**	Beaver Stadium • University Park, PA	BTN	**W** **PSU** 34–27	103,861	
September 7	12:00 PM	Akron	**Rutgers**	SHI Stadium • Piscataway, NJ	BTN	**W** 49–17	41,021	
September 7	3:30 PM	Iowa State	No. 21 **Iowa**	Kinnick Stadium • Iowa City, IA (Cy-Hawk Trophy)	CBS	**L** 19–20	69,250	
September 7	3:30 PM	No. 6 (FCS) South Dakota	**Wisconsin**	Camp Randall Stadium • Madison, WI	FS1	**W** 27–13	76,069	
September 7	3:30 PM	**Michigan State**	**Maryland**	SECU Stadium • College Park, MD	BTN	**MSU** 27–24	34,819	
September 7	3:30 PM	Eastern Michigan	**Washington**	Husky Stadium • Seattle, WA	BTN	**W** 30–9	64,222	
September 7	7:00 PM	No. 19 Kansas	**Illinois**	Memorial Stadium • Champaign, IL	FS1	**W** 23–17	60,670	
September 7	7:30 PM	Colorado	**Nebraska**	Memorial Stadium • Lincoln, NE	NBC	**W** 28–10	86,906	
September 7	7:30 PM	Western Michigan	No. 2 **Ohio State**	Ohio Stadium • Columbus, OH	BTN	**W** 56–0	102,665	
September 7	10:00 PM	Boise State	No. 7 **Oregon**	Autzen Stadium • Eugene, OR	Peacock	**W** 37–34	58,134	
September 7	11:00 PM	Utah State	No. 13 **USC**	Los Angeles Memorial Coliseum • Los Angeles, CA	BTN	**W** 48–0	68,110	
^{#}Rankings from AP Poll released prior to game. All times are in Eastern Time.

Date	Bye Week	
September 7	Purdue	UCLA

==== Week 3 ====
Date	Time	Visiting team	Home team	Site	TV	Result	Attendance	Ref.
September 14	12:00 PM	No. 4 Alabama	**Wisconsin**	Camp Randall Stadium • Madison, WI (Big Noon Kickoff)	FOX	**L** 10–42	76,323	
September 14†	12:00 PM	Central Michigan	**Illinois**	Memorial Stadium • Champaign, IL	Peacock	**W** 30–9	51,498	
September 14†	12:00 PM	Arkansas State	No. 17 **Michigan**	Michigan Stadium • Ann Arbor, MI	BTN	**W** 28–18	110,250	
September 14	3:30 PM	No. 9 **Oregon**	Oregon State	Reser Stadium • Corvallis, OR (Rivalry)	FOX	**W** 49–14	38,419	
September 14	3:30 PM	No. 18 Notre Dame	**Purdue**	Ross-Ade Stadium • West Lafayette, IN	CBS	**L** 7–66	61,441	
September 14	3:30 PM	Washington State	**Washington**	Lumen Field • Seattle, WA (Apple Cup)	Peacock	**L** 19–24	57,567	
September 14	3:30 PM	Prairie View A&M	**Michigan State**	Spartan Stadium • East Lansing, MI	BTN	**W** 40–0	70,066	
September 14	3:30 PM	Nevada	**Minnesota**	Huntington Bank Stadium • Minneapolis, MN	BTN	**W** 27–0	44,534	
September 14	4:00 PM	Troy	**Iowa**	Kinnick Stadium • Iowa City, IA	FS1	**W** 38–21	69,250	
September 14	7:30 PM	**Indiana**	**UCLA**	Rose Bowl • Pasadena, CA	NBC	**IU** 42–13	47,811	
September 14	7:30 PM	No. 21 (FCS) Northern Iowa	No. 23 **Nebraska**	Memorial Stadium • Lincoln, NE	BTN	**W** 34–3	86,546	
September 14	7:30 PM	Eastern Illinois	**Northwestern**	Martin Stadium • Evanston, IL	BTN	**W** 31–7	10,631	
September 14	8:00 PM	**Maryland**	Virginia	Scott Stadium • Charlottesville, VA	ACCN	**W** 27–13	41,352	
^{†}Homecoming. ^{#}Rankings from AP Poll released prior to game. All times are in Eastern Time.

Date	Bye Week			
September 14	#3 Ohio State	#8 Penn State	Rutgers	#11 USC

==== Week 4 ====
Date	Time	Visiting team	Home team	Site	TV	Result	Attendance	Ref.
September 20	8:00 PM	No. 24 **Illinois**	No. 22 **Nebraska**	Memorial Stadium • Lincoln, NE	FOX	**ILL 31–24** ^{OT}	86,936	
September 21	12:00 PM	Marshall	No. 3 **Ohio State**	Ohio Stadium • Columbus, OH	FOX	**W** 49–14	103,871	
September 21	12:00 PM	Charlotte	**Indiana**	Memorial Stadium • Bloomington, IN	BTN	**W** 52–14	43,109	
September 21	12:00 PM	No. 5 (FCS) Villanova	**Maryland**	SECU Stadium • College Park, MD	BTN	**W** 38–20	38,006	
September 21	3:30 PM	No. 11 **USC**	No. 18 **Michigan**	Michigan Stadium • Ann Arbor, MI	CBS	**MICH 27–24**	110,702	
September 21	3:30 PM	Kent State	No. 10 **Penn State**	Beaver Stadium • University Park, PA	BTN	**W** **PSU** 56–0	109,526	
September 21	3:30 PM	**Rutgers**	Virginia Tech	Lane Stadium • Blacksburg, VA	ACCN	**W** 26–23	65,632	
September 21	3:30 PM	**UCLA**	No. 16 LSU	Tiger Stadium • Baton Rouge, LA	ABC	**L** 17–34	100,315	
September 21	7:00 PM	**Northwestern**	**Washington**	Husky Stadium • Seattle, WA	FS1	**WASH 24–5**	69,788	
September 21	7:30 PM	**Iowa**	**Minnesota**	Huntington Bank Stadium • Minneapolis, MN (Floyd of Rosedale)	NBC	**IOWA 31–14**	52,048	
September 21	8:00 PM	**Michigan State**	Boston College	Alumni Stadium • Chestnut Hill, MA	ACCN	**L** 19–23	44,500	
September 21	8:30 PM	**Purdue**	Oregon State	Reser Stadium • Corvallis, OR	The CW	**L** 21–38	34,340	
^{#}Rankings from AP Poll released prior to game. All times are in Eastern Time.

Date	Bye Week	
September 21	#9 Oregon	Wisconsin

==== Week 5 ====
Date	Time	Visiting team	Home team	Site	TV	Result	Attendance	Ref.
September 27	8:00 PM	**Washington**	**Rutgers**	SHI Stadium • Piscataway, NJ	FOX	**RUT** 21–18	54,079	
September 28	12:00 PM	**Minnesota**	No. 12 **Michigan**	Michigan Stadium • Ann Arbor, MI	FOX	**MICH** 27–24	110,340	
September 28	12:00 PM	**Maryland**	**Indiana**	Memorial Stadium • Bloomington, IN	BTN	**IU** 42–28	48,323	
September 28†	12:00 PM	**Nebraska**	**Purdue**	Ross-Ade Stadium • West Lafayette, IN	Peacock	**NEB** 28–10	61,441	
September 28	3:30 PM	**Wisconsin**	No. 13 **USC**	L.A. Memorial Coliseum • Los Angeles, CA	CBS	**USC** 38–21	74,118	
September 28	7:30 PM	No. 3 **Ohio State**	**Michigan State**	Spartan Stadium • East Lansing, MI	Peacock	**OSU** 38–7	71,114	
September 28†	7:30 PM	No. 19 **Illinois**	No. 9 **Penn State**	Beaver Stadium • University Park, PA	NBC	**PSU** 21–7	109,911	
September 28	11:00 PM	No. 8 **Oregon**	**UCLA**	Rose Bowl • Pasadena, CA	FOX	**ORE** 34–13	43,051	
^{†}Homecoming. ^{#}Rankings from AP Poll released prior to game. All times are in Eastern Time.

Date	Bye Week	
September 28	Iowa	Northwestern

==== Week 6 ====
Date	Time	Visiting team	Home team	Site	TV	Result	Attendance	Ref.
October 4	9:00 PM	**Michigan State**	No. 6 **Oregon**	Autzen Stadium • Eugene, OR	FOX	**ORE** 31–10	59,802	
October 5	12:00 PM	**UCLA**	No. 7 **Penn State**	Beaver Stadium • University Park, PA	FOX	**PSU** 27–11	110,047	
October 5†	12:00 PM	**Purdue**	**Wisconsin**	Camp Randall Stadium • Madison, WI	BTN	**WIS** 52–6	76,091	
October 5	3:30 PM	**Iowa**	No. 3 **Ohio State**	Ohio Stadium • Columbus, OH	CBS	**OSU** 35–7	105,135	
October 5	3:30 PM	No. 23 **Indiana**	**Northwestern**	Martin Stadium • Evanston, IL	BTN	**IU** 41–24	12,023	
October 5	4:00 PM	**Rutgers**	**Nebraska**	Memorial Stadium • Lincoln, NE	FS1	**NEB** 14–7	87,464	
October 5	7:30 PM	No. 10 **Michigan**	**Washington**	Husky Stadium • Seattle, WA	NBC	**WASH** 27–17	72,132	
October 5	7:30 PM	No. 11 **USC**	**Minnesota**	Huntington Bank Stadium • Minneapolis, MN	BTN	**MIN** 24–17	50,913	
^{†}Homecoming. ^{#}Rankings from AP Poll released prior to game. All times are in Eastern Time.

Date	Bye Week	
October 5	#24 Illinois	Maryland

==== Week 7 ====
Date	Time	Visiting team	Home team	Site	TV	Result	Attendance	Ref.
October 11	8:00 PM	**Northwestern**	**Maryland**	SECU Stadium • College Park, MD	FS1	**NU** 37–10	39,371	
October 12	12:00 PM	**Washington**	**Iowa**	Kinnick Stadium • Iowa City, IA	FOX	**IOWA** 40–16	69,250	
October 12	12:00 PM	**Wisconsin**	**Rutgers**	SHI Stadium • Piscataway, NJ	BTN	**WIS** 42–7	50,111	
October 12	3:30 PM	No. 4 **Penn State**	**USC**	L.A. Memorial Coliseum • Los Angeles, CA	CBS	**PSU** 33–30 ^{OT}	75,250	
October 12	3:30 PM	**Purdue**	No. 23 **Illinois**	Memorial Stadium • Champaign, IL	FS1	**ILL** 50–49 ^{OT}	55,815	
October 12	7:30 PM	No. 2 **Ohio State**	No. 3 **Oregon**	Autzen Stadium • Eugene, OR (College GameDay)	NBC	**ORE** 32–31	60,129	
October 12	9:00 PM	**Minnesota**	**UCLA**	Rose Bowl • Pasadena, CA	BTN	**MIN** 21–17	42,012	
^{#}Rankings from AP Poll released prior to game. All times are in Eastern Time.

Date	Bye Week			
October 12	No. 18 Indiana	No. 24 Michigan	Michigan State	Nebraska

==== Week 8 ====
Date	Time	Visiting team	Home team	Site	TV	Result	Attendance	Ref.
October 18	8:00 PM	No. 2 **Oregon**	**Purdue**	Ross-Ade Stadium • West Lafayette, IN	FOX	**ORE** 35–0	57,463	
October 19†	12:00 PM	**Nebraska**	No. 16 **Indiana**	Memorial Stadium • Bloomington, IN	FOX	**IU** 56–7	53,082	
October 19†	12:00 PM	**UCLA**	**Rutgers**	SHI Stadium • Piscataway, NJ	FS1	**UCLA** 35–32	53,726	
October 19	12:00 PM	**Wisconsin**	**Northwestern**	Martin Stadium • Evanston, IL	BTN	**WIS** 23–3	12,023	
October 19	3:30 PM	No. 24 **Michigan**	No. 22 **Illinois**	Memorial Stadium • Champaign, IL	CBS	**ILL** 21–7	60,670	
October 19†	4:00 PM	**USC**	**Maryland**	SECU Stadium • College Park, MD	FS1	**MD** 29–28	43,013	
October 19†	7:30 PM	**Iowa**	**Michigan State**	Spartan Stadium • East Lansing, MI	NBC	**MSU** 32-20	69,682	
^{†}Homecoming. ^{#}Rankings from AP Poll released prior to game. All times are in Eastern Time.

Date	Bye Week			
October 19	Minnesota	No. 4 Ohio State	No. 3 Penn State	Washington

==== Week 9 ====
Date	Time	Visiting team	Home team	Site	TV	Result	Attendance	Ref.
October 25	11:00 PM	**Rutgers**	**USC**	L.A. Memorial Coliseum • Los Angeles, CA	FOX	**USC** 42–20	63,404	
October 26†	12:00 PM	**Nebraska**	No. 4 **Ohio State**	Ohio Stadium • Columbus, OH	FOX	**OSU** 21–17	104,830	
October 26	12:00 PM	**Washington**	No. 13 **Indiana**	Memorial Stadium • Bloomington, IN (College GameDay)	BTN	**IU** 31–17	53,082	
October 26†	3:30 PM	No. 20 **Illinois**	No. 1 **Oregon**	Autzen Stadium • Eugene, OR	CBS	**ORE** 38–9	59,830	
October 26†	3:30 PM	**Maryland**	**Minnesota**	Huntington Bank Stadium • Minneapolis, MN	FS1	**MIN** 48–23	48,696	
October 26†	3:30 PM	**Northwestern**	**Iowa**	Kinnick Stadium • Iowa City, IA	BTN	**IA** 40–14	69,250	
October 26†	7:30 PM	No. 3 **Penn State**	**Wisconsin**	Camp Randall Stadium • Madison, WI	NBC	**PSU** 28–13	76,403	
October 26	7:30 PM	**Michigan State**	**Michigan**	Michigan Stadium • Ann Arbor, MI (Rivalry)	BTN	**MICH** 24–17	110,849	
^{†}Homecoming. ^{#}Rankings from AP Poll released prior to game. All times are in Eastern Time.

Date	Bye Week	
October 26	Purdue	UCLA

==== Week 10 ====
Date	Time	Visiting team	Home team	Site	TV	Result	Attendance	Ref.
November 2	12:00 PM	No. 4 **Ohio State**	No. 3 **Penn State**	Beaver Stadium • University Park, PA (Rivalry/College GameDay)	FOX	**OSU** 20–13	111,030	
November 2	12:00 PM	**Minnesota**	No. 24 **Illinois**	Memorial Stadium • Champaign, IL	FS1	**MINN** 25–17	58,088	
November 2	12:00 PM	**Northwestern**	**Purdue**	Ross-Ade Stadium • West Lafayette, IN	BTN	**NU** 26–20^{OT}	61,141	
November 2	3:30 PM	No. 1 **Oregon**	**Michigan**	Michigan Stadium • Ann Arbor, MI	CBS	**ORE** 38–17	110,576	
November 2	3:30 PM	No. 13 **Indiana**	**Michigan State**	Spartan Stadium • East Lansing, MI	Peacock	**IU** 47–10	68,423	
November 2	3:30 PM	**UCLA**	**Nebraska**	Memorial Stadium • Lincoln, NE	BTN	**UCLA** 27–20	87,453	
November 2	7:30 PM	**Wisconsin**	**Iowa**	Kinnick Stadium • Iowa City, IA	NBC	**IOWA** 42–10	69,250	
November 2†	7:30 PM	**USC**	**Washington**	Husky Stadium • Seattle, WA	BTN	**WASH** 26–21	71,251	
^{#}Rankings from AP Poll released prior to game. All times are in Eastern Time.

Date	Bye Week	
November 2	Maryland	Rutgers

==== Week 11 ====
Date	Time	Visiting team	Home team	Site	TV	Result	Attendance	Ref.
November 8†	9:00 PM	Iowa	**UCLA**	Rose Bowl • Pasadena, CA	FOX	**UCLA** 20–17	53,467	
November 9	12:00 PM	Purdue	No. 2 **Ohio State**	Ohio Stadium • Columbus, OH	FOX	**OSU** 45-0	103,463	
November 9	12:00 PM	Minnesota	**Rutgers**	SHI Stadium • Piscataway, NJ	NBC	**RUT** 26-19	44,120	
November 9	3:30 PM	Michigan	No. 8 **Indiana**	Memorial Stadium • Bloomington, IN	CBS	**IU** 20-15	53,082	
November 9	7:00 PM	Maryland	No. 1 **Oregon**	Autzen Stadium • Eugene, OR	BTN	**ORE** 39-18	59,245	
November 9	8:00 PM	Washington	No. 4 **Penn State**	Beaver Stadium • University Park, PA	Peacock	**PSU** 35–6	110,233	
^{#}Rankings from AP Poll released prior to game. All times are in Eastern Time.

Date	Bye Week					
November 9	Illinois	Michigan State	Nebraska	Northwestern	USC	Wisconsin

==== Week 12 ====
Date	Time	Visiting team	Home team	Site	TV	Result	Attendance	Ref.
November 15	9:00 PM	**UCLA**	Washington	Husky Stadium • Seattle, WA	FOX	**WASH** 31-19	68,811	
November 16†	12:00 PM	No. 2 **Ohio State**	Northwestern	Wrigley Field • Chicago, IL	BTN	**OSU** 31-7	38,147	
November 16	2:30 PM	**Michigan State**	Illinois	Memorial Stadium • Champaign, IL	FS1	**ILL** 38-16	52,660	
November 16	3:30 PM	No. 4 **Penn State**	Purdue	Ross-Ade Stadium • West Lafayette, IN	CBS	**PSU** 49–10	58,346	
November 16†	4:00 PM	**Nebraska**	USC	L.A. Memorial Coliseum • Los Angeles, CA	FOX	**USC** 28-20	75,304	
November 16	6:00 PM	**Rutgers**	Maryland	SECU Stadium • College Park, MD	FS1	**RUT** 31-17	31,433	
November 16	7:30 PM	No. 1 **Oregon**	Wisconsin	Camp Randall Stadium • Madison, WI	NBC	**ORE** 16-13	76,298	
^{†}Homecoming. ^{#}Rankings from AP Poll released prior to game. All times are in Eastern Time.

Date	Bye Week			
November 16	No. 5 Indiana	Iowa	Michigan	Minnesota

==== Week 13 ====
Date	Time	Visiting team	Home team	Site	TV	Result	Attendance	Ref.
November 22	8:00 PM	**Purdue**	**Michigan State**	Spartan Stadium • East Lansing, MI	FOX	**MSU** 24–16	57,558	
November 23	12:00 PM	No. 5 **Indiana**	No. 2 **Ohio State**	Ohio Stadium • Columbus, OH	FOX	**OSU** 38–15	105,751	
November 23	12:00 PM	No. 24 **Illinois**	**Rutgers**	SHI Stadium • Piscataway, NJ	Peacock	**ILL** 38–31	47,524	
November 23	12:00 PM	**Iowa**	**Maryland**	SECU Stadium • College Park, MD	BTN	**IOWA** 29–13	30,214	
November 23	3:30 PM	No. 4 **Penn State**	**Minnesota**	Huntington Bank Stadium • Minneapolis, MN	CBS	**PSU** 26–25	44,266	
November 23	3:30 PM	**Northwestern**	**Michigan**	Michigan Stadium • Ann Arbor, MI	FS1	**MICH** 50-6	109,830	
November 23	3:30 PM	**Wisconsin**	**Nebraska**	Memorial Stadium • Lincoln, NE	BTN	**NEB** 44-25	86,923	
November 23	10:30 PM	**USC**	**UCLA**	Rose Bowl • Pasadena, CA	NBC	**USC** 19-13	59,473	
^{#}Rankings from AP Poll released prior to game. All times are in Eastern Time.

Date	Bye Week	
November 23	No. 1 Oregon	Washington

==== Week 14 ====
Date	Time	Visiting team	Home team	Site	TV	Result	Attendance	Ref.
November 29	12:00 PM	**Minnesota**	**Wisconsin**	Camp Randall Stadium • Madison, WI (Paul Bunyan's Axe)	CBS	**MIN** 24-7	76,059	
November 29	7:30 PM	**Nebraska**	**Iowa**	Kinnick Stadium • Iowa City, IA	NBC	**IA** 13-10	69,250	
November 30	12:00 PM	**Michigan**	No. 3 **Ohio State**	Ohio Stadium • Columbus, OH (The Game/Big Noon Kickoff)	FOX	**MICH** 13-10	106,005	
November 30	12:00 PM	No. 23 **Illinois**	**Northwestern**	Wrigley Field • Chicago, IL (Land of Lincoln Trophy)	BTN	**NU** 38-28	26,378	
November 30	3:30 PM	Notre Dame	**USC**	L.A. Memorial Coliseum • Los Angeles, CA (Battle for the Jeweled Shillelagh)	CBS	**ND** 49-35	73,241	
November 30	3:30 PM	**Rutgers**	**Michigan State**	Spartan Stadium • East Lansing, MI	FS1	**RUT** 41-14	50,038	
November 30	3:30 PM	**Maryland**	No. 4 **Penn State**	Beaver Stadium • University Park, PA	BTN	**PSU** 44–7	104,044	
November 30	3:30 PM	Fresno State	**UCLA**	Rose Bowl • Pasadena, CA	BTN	**UCLA** 20-13	35,018	
November 30	7:00 PM	**Purdue**	No. 10 **Indiana**	Memorial Stadium • Bloomington, IN (Old Oaken Bucket)	FS1	**IU** 66-0	53,082	
November 30	7:30 PM	**Washington**	No. 1 **Oregon**	Autzen Stadium • Eugene, OR (rivalry)	NBC	**ORE** 49-21	59,603	
^{#}Rankings from AP Poll released prior to game. All times are in Eastern Time.

==== Big Ten Championship Game ====
Date	Time	Visiting team	Home team	Site	TV	Result	Attendance	Ref.
December 7	8:00 PM	No. 3 **Penn State**	No. 1 **Oregon**	Lucas Oil Stadium • Indianapolis, IN (Big Ten Championship Game)	CBS	**ORE** 45–37	67,649	
^{#}Rankings from AP Poll released prior to game. All times are in Eastern Time.

== Postseason ==
=== Bowl games ===
For the 2020–2025 bowl cycle, The Big Ten will have annually eight appearances in the following bowls: Rose Bowl (unless they are selected for playoffs filled by a Pac-12 team if champion is in the playoffs), Citrus Bowl, Guaranteed Rate Bowl, Las Vegas Bowl, Music City Bowl, Pinstripe Bowl, Quick Lane Bowl, and Outback Bowl. The Big Ten teams will go to a New Year's Six bowl if a team finishes higher than the champions of Power Five conferences in the final College Football Playoff rankings. The Big Ten champion is also eligible for the College Football Playoff if it is among the top four teams in the final CFP ranking.

Legend
Big Ten win
Big Ten loss

Bowl game	Date	Site	Television	Time (EST)	Big Ten team	Opponent	Score	Attendance	Ref.
Rate Bowl	December 26, 2024	Chase Field • Phoenix, AZ	ESPN	5:30 p.m.	Rutgers	Kansas State	L 41–44	21,659	
Las Vegas Bowl	December 27, 2024	Allegiant Stadium • Paradise, NV	ESPN	10:30 p.m.	USC	Texas A&M	W 35-31	26,671	
Pinstripe Bowl	December 28, 2024	Yankee Stadium • The Bronx, NY	ABC	12:00 p.m.	Nebraska	Boston College	W 20-15	30,062	
Music City Bowl	December 30, 2024	Nissan Stadium • Nashville, TN	ESPN	2:30 p.m.	Iowa	No. 19 Missouri	L 24-27	43,375	
ReliaQuest Bowl	December 31, 2024	Raymond James Stadium • Tampa, FL	ESPN	12:00 p.m.	Michigan	No. 11 Alabama	W 19-13	51,439	
Sun Bowl	December 31, 2024	Sun Bowl • El Paso, TX	CBS	2:00 p.m.	Washington	Louisville	L 34-35	40,826	
Citrus Bowl	December 31, 2024	Camping World Stadium • Orlando, FL	ABC	3:00 p.m.	No. 20 Illinois	No. 15 South Carolina	W 21-17	47,129	
Duke's Mayo Bowl	January 3, 2025	Bank of America Stadium • Charlotte, NC	ESPN	7:30 p.m.	Minnesota	Virginia Tech	W 24-10	31,927	
College Football Playoff bowl games
College Football Playoff (First Round)	December 20, 2024	Notre Dame Stadium • Notre Dame, IN	ABC/ESPN	8:00 p.m.	No. 8 Indiana	No. 5 Notre Dame	L 17–27	77,622	
College Football Playoff (First Round)	December 21, 2024	Beaver Stadium • University Park, PA	TNT/Max	12:00 p.m.	No. 4 Penn State	No. 10 SMU	W PSU 38–10	106,013	
College Football Playoff (First Round)	December 21, 2024	Ohio Stadium • Columbus, OH	ABC/ESPN	8:00 p.m.	No. 6 Ohio State	No. 7 Tennessee	W 42–17	102,819	
Fiesta Bowl (Quarterfinal)	December 31, 2024	State Farm Stadium • Glendale, AZ	ESPN	7:30 p.m.	No. 4 Penn State	No. 9 Boise State	W PSU 31–14	63,854	
Rose Bowl (Quarterfinal)	January 1, 2025	Rose Bowl • Pasadena, CA	ESPN	5:00 p.m.	No. 1 Oregon	No. 6 Ohio State	OSU 41-21	90,732	
Orange Bowl (Semifinal)	January 9, 2025	Hard Rock Stadium • Miami Gardens, FL	ESPN	7:30 p.m.	No. 4 Penn State	No. 5 Notre Dame	L 27–24	66,881	
Cotton Bowl (Semifinal)	January 10, 2025	AT&T Stadium • Arlington, TX	ESPN	7:30 p.m.	No. 6 Ohio State	No. 3 Texas	W 28-14	74,527	
CFP National Championship Game	January 20, 2025	Mercedes-Benz Stadium • Atlanta, GA	ESPN	7:30 p.m.	No. 6 Ohio State	No. 5 Notre Dame	W 34–23	77,660	

For the 2020–2025 bowl cycle, the Big Ten is scheduled to annually have eight appearances in the following bowls: Rose Bowl (unless they are selected for playoffs filled by a Pac-12 team if champion is in the playoffs), Citrus Bowl, Rate Bowl (formerly the Guaranteed Rate Bowl), Las Vegas Bowl, Music City Bowl, Pinstripe Bowl, GameAbove Sports Bowl (formerly the Quick Lane Bowl), and ReliaQuest Bowl (formerly the Outback Bowl). The Big Ten teams will go to a New Year's Six bowl if a team finishes higher than the champions of Power Four conferences in the final College Football Playoff rankings. The Big Ten champion is also eligible for the College Football Playoff if it is among the qualifying teams in the final CFP ranking.

== Big Ten records vs other conferences ==
2024–2025 records against non-conference foes

Power 5 conferences	Record
ACC	2–3
Big 12	3–1
Notre Dame	0–2
Pac-12	1–2
SEC	1–3
Power 5 total	7–11
Other FBS conferences	Record
American	2-0
CUSA	2–0
Independents (Excluding Notre Dame)	1–0
MAC	9-0
Mountain West	6-0
Sun Belt	3-0
Other FBS total	23-0
FCS opponents	Record
Football Championship Subdivision	13-0
Total non-conference record	43-11

Post season

Power 5 conferences	Record
ACC	3-1
Big 12	0–1
Notre Dame	1–2
Pac-12	0–0
SEC	5–1
Power 5 total	9–5
Other FBS conferences	Record
American	0–0
CUSA	0–0
Independents (Excluding Notre Dame)	0–0
MAC	0–0
Mountain West	1–0
Sun Belt	0–0
Other FBS total	1–0
Total bowl record	10–5

== Awards and honors ==
=== Player of the Week Honors ===
Week	Offensive			Defensive			Special Teams			Freshman		
Week	Player	Position	Team	Player	Position	Team	Player	Position	Team	Player	Position	Team
Week 1 (September 2)	Miller Moss	QB	USC	Kevin Winston Jr.	S	PSU	Mateen Bhagani	K	UCLA	Dylan Raiola	QB	NEB
Week 1 (September 2)	Miller Moss	QB	USC	Kevin Winston Jr.	S	PSU	Dominic Zvada	K	MICH	Dylan Raiola	QB	NEB
Week 2 (September 9)	Kyle Monangai	RB	RUT	Xavier Scott	DB	ILL	Tez Johnson	WR	ORE	Nick Marsh	WR	MSU
Week 3 (September 16)	Kurtis Rourke	QB	IU	Dante Trader Jr.	DB	MD	Atticus Sappington	K	ORE	Kerry Brown	DB	MIN
Week 4 (September 23)	Kaleb Johnson	RB	IA	Josaiah Stewart	DE	MICH	Tommy Doman	P	MICH	Khmori House	LB	WAS
Week 4 (September 23)	Luke Altmyer	QB	ILL	Josaiah Stewart	DE	MICH	Tommy Doman	P	MICH	Khmori House	LB	WAS
Week 5 (September 30)	Kalel Mullings	RB	MICH	Abdul Carter	DE/LB	PSU	Dominic Zvada (2)	K	MICH	Jeremiah Smith	WR	OSU
Week 5 (September 30)	Tez Johnson	WR	ORE	Abdul Carter	DE/LB	PSU	Dominic Zvada (2)	K	MICH	Jeremiah Smith	WR	OSU
Week 6 (October 7)	Kurtis Rourke (2)	QB	IU	Jordan Burch	DE	ORE	Brian Buschini	P	NEB	Trech Kekahuna	WR	WIS
Week 6 (October 7)	Emeka Egbuka	WR	OSU	Jordan Burch	DE	ORE	Brian Buschini	P	NEB	Trech Kekahuna	WR	WIS
Week 7 (October 14)	Dillon Gabriel	QB	ORE	Aaron Graves	DL	IA	Luke Akers	K/P	NW	Ryan Barker	K	PSU
Week 7 (October 14)	Tyler Warren	TE	PSU	Koi Perich	DB	MIN	Luke Akers	K/P	NW	Ryan Barker	K	PSU
Week 8 (October 21)	Ethan Garbers	QB	UCLA	Gabe Jacas	LB	ILL	Jonathan Kim	K/P	MSU	Nick Marsh (2)	WR	MSU
Week 9 (October 28)	Max Brosmer	QB	MIN	D'Angelo Ponds	DB	IU	Kaden Wetjen	PR	IA	Koi Perich	DB	MIN
Week 10 (November 4)	Kaleb Johnson (2)	RB	IA	Carson Bruener	LB	WAS	Dragan Kesich	K	MIN	Kwazi Gilmer	WR	UCLA
Week 11 (November 11)	Will Howard	QB	OSU	Carson Schwesinger	LB	UCLA	Dominic Zvada (3)	K	MICH	Jeremiah Smith (2)	WR	OSU
Week 12 (November 18)	Tyler Warren (2)	TE	PSU	Matayo Uiagalelei	OLB	ORE	Atticus Sappington (2)	K	ORE	Demond Williams Jr.	QB	WAS
Week 12 (November 18)	Tyler Warren (2)	TE	PSU	Russell Davis II	DL	WAS	Atticus Sappington (2)	K	ORE	Demond Williams Jr.	QB	WAS
Week 13 (November 25)	Pat Bryant	WR	ILL	Cody Simon	LB	OSU	Drew Stevens	K	IA	Jacory Barney Jr.	WR	NEB
Week 13 (November 25)	Will Howard (2)	QB	OSU	Cody Simon	LB	OSU	Drew Stevens	K	IA	Jacory Barney Jr.	WR	NEB
Week 14 (December 2)	Aidan Laughery	RB	ILL	Jailin Walker	LB	IU	Drew Stevens (2)	K	IA	Antwan Raymond	RB	RUT
Week 14 (December 2)	Kurtis Rourke (3)	QB	IU	Jailin Walker	LB	IU	Dominic Zvada (4)	K	MICH	Antwan Raymond	RB	RUT

=== Big Ten individual awards ===
The following individuals won the conference's annual player and coach awards:

Award	Player	School
Most Valuable Player	Dillon Gabriel	Oregon
Graham–George Offensive Player of the Year	Dillon Gabriel	Oregon
Griese–Brees Quarterback of the Year	Dillon Gabriel	Oregon
Richter–Howard Receiver of the Year	Jeremiah Smith	Ohio State
Ameche–Dayne Running Back of the Year	Kaleb Johnson	Iowa
Kwalick–Clark Tight End of the Year	Tyler Warren	Penn State
Rimington–Pace Offensive Lineman of the Year	Aireontae Ersery	Minnesota
Nagurski–Woodson Defensive Player of the Year	Abdul Carter	Penn State
Smith–Brown Defensive Lineman of the Year	Abdul Carter	Penn State
Butkus–Fitzgerald Linebacker of the Year	Jay Higgins	Iowa
Tatum–Woodson Defensive Back of the Year	Caleb Downs	Ohio State
Thompson–Randle El Freshman of the Year	Jeremiah Smith	Ohio State
Bakken–Andersen Kicker of the Year	Dominic Zvada	Michigan
Eddleman–Fields Punter of the Year	Eddie Czaplicki	USC
Rodgers–Dwight Return Specialist of the Year	Kaden Wetjen	Iowa
Hayes–Schembechler Coach of the Year	Curt Cignetti	Indiana
Dave McClain Coach of the Year	Curt Cignetti	Indiana
Dungy–Thompson Humanitarian Award	Madieu Williams	Maryland
Ford–Kinnick Leadership Award	Russell Wilson	Wisconsin

=== All-Conference Teams ===
2024 Big Ten All-Conference Teams and Awards

Position	Player	Team
First Team Offense (Coaches)
QB	Dillon Gabriel	Oregon
RB	Kaleb Johnson	Iowa
RB	Kyle Monangai	Rutgers
WR	Tai Felton	Maryland
WR	Jeremiah Smith	Ohio State
TE	Tyler Warren	Penn State
C	Logan Jones	Iowa
OG	Connor Colby	Iowa
OG	Donovan Jackson	Ohio State
OT	Aireontae Ersery	Minnesota
OT	Josh Conerly Jr.	Oregon
First Team Defense (Coaches)
DL	Mikail Kamara	Indiana
DL	Mason Graham	Michigan
DL	Abdul Carter	Penn State
DL	JT Tuimoloau	Ohio State
LB	Aiden Fisher	Indiana
LB	Jay Higgins	Iowa
LB	Carson Schwesinger	UCLA
LB	Cody Lindenberg	Minnesota
DB	D'Angelo Ponds	Indiana
DB	Koi Perich	Minnesota
DB	Caleb Downs	Ohio State
DB	Lathan Ransom	Ohio State
First Team Special Teams (Coaches)
PK	Dominic Zvada	Michigan
P	Eddie Czaplicki	USC
RS	Kaden Wetjen	Iowa
LS	William Wagner	Michigan

Position	Player	Team
Second Team Offense (Coaches)
QB	Kurtis Rourke	Indiana
RB	Jordan James	Oregon
RB	Woody Marks	USC
WR	Pat Bryant	Illinois
WR	Tez Johnson	Oregon
TE	Colston Loveland	Michigan
C	Logan Jones	Iowa
OG	Olaivavega Ioane	Penn State
OG	Emmanuel Pregnon	USC
OT	Hollin Pierce	Rutgers
OT	Gennings Dunker	Iowa
Second Team Defense (Coaches)
DL	Kenneth Grant	Michigan
DL	Josaiah Stewart	Michigan
DL	Jack Sawyer	Ohio State
DL	Matayo Uiagalelei	Oregon
LB	Bryce Boettcher	Oregon
LB	Kobe King	Penn State
LB	Sonny Styles	Ohio State
DB	Jaylen Reed	Penn State
DB	Xavier Scott	Illinois
DB	Justin Walley	Minnesota
DB	Theran Johnson	Northwestern
Second Team Special Teams (Coaches)
PK	Jonathan Kim	Michigan State
P	Ryan Eckley	Michigan State
RS	Tez Johnson	Oregon
LS	Luke Basso	Oregon

Position	Player	Team
Third Team Offense (Coaches)
QB	Will Howard	Ohio State
RB	TreVeyon Henderson	Ohio State
RB	Quinshon Judkins	Ohio State
WR	Elijah Sarratt	Indiana
WR	Emeka Egbuka	Ohio State
TE	Max Klare	Purdue
C	Jonah Monheim	USC
OG	Marcus Harper II	Oregon
OG	Joe Huber	Wisconsin
OT	J.C. Davis	Illinois
OT	Ajani Cornelius	Oregon
Third Team Defense (Coaches)
DL	Gabe Jacas	Illinois
DL	Ty Robinson	Nebraska
DL	Jordan Burch	Oregon
DL	Derrick Harmon	Oregon
DL	Tyleik Williams	Ohio State
LB	Carson Bruener	Washington
LB	Cody Simon	Ohio State
LB	Kain Medrano	UCLA
DB	Sebastian Castro	Iowa
DB	Jermari Harris	Iowa
DB	A.J. Harris	Penn State
DB	Jaylin Smith	USC
Third Team Special Teams (Coaches)
PK	Drew Stevens	Iowa
P	Rhys Dakin	Iowa
RS	Makai Lemon	USC
LS	Hank Pepper	USC

Coaches Honorable Mention: ILLINOIS: Luke Altmyer, Hank Beatty, TeRah Edwards, Josh Gesky, Lane Hansen, Josh Kreutz, David Olano, Melvin Priestly, Dylan Rosiek; INDIANA: James Carpenter, Justice Ellison, Zach Horton, Mike Katic, Mark Langston, Carter Smith, Jailin Walker, CJ West; IOWA: Yahya Black, Luke Elkin, Aaron Graves, Ethan Hurkett, Nick Jackson, Quinn Schulte, Beau Stephens, Mason Richman; MARYLAND: Bryce McFerson, Dante Trader Jr.; MICHIGAN: Zeke Berry, Donovan Edwards, Giovanni El-Hadi, Ernest Hausmann, Myles Hinton, Will Johnson, Derrick Moore, Semaj Morgan, Kalel Mullings, Josh Priebe; MICHIGAN STATE: Charles Brantley, Luke Newman, Jordan Turner; MINNESOTA: Tyler Cooper, Daniel Jackson, Jah Joyner, Koi Perich, Ethan Robinson, Anthony Smith, Alan Soukup, Danny Striggow, Darius Taylor; NEBRASKA: Bryce Benhart, Brian Buschini, John Bullock, Malcolm Hartzog Jr., Nash Hutmacher; NORTHWESTERN: Joe Himon, Aidan Hubbard, Xander Mueller, Anto Saka, Josh Thompson, Caleb Tiernan, Damon Walters; OHIO STATE: Denzel Burke, John Ferlmann, Josh Fryar, Ty Hamilton, Davison Igbinosun, Tegra Tshabola, Josh Simmons; OREGON: Jeff Bassa, Jamaree Caldwell, Traeshon Holden, Tysheem Johnson, Iapani Laloulu, Jabbar Muhammad, Nikko Reed, Atticus Sappington, Evan Stewart, Teitum Tuioti; PENN STATE: Drew Allar, Ryan Barker, Anthony Donkoh, Zane Durant, Tyler Duzansky, Tony Rojas, Drew Shelton, Nicholas Singleton, Sal Wormley; PURDUE: Keelan Crimmins, Gus Hartwig, Will Heldt, Kydran Jenkins, Nick Levy, Marcus Mbow, Dillon Thieneman; RUTGERS: Kwabena Asamoah, Dariel Djabome, Kyonte Hamilton, Robert Longerbeam, Austin Riggs, Ian Strong; UCLA: Kaylin Moore, Jay Toia; USC: Makai Lemon, Easton Mascarenas-Arnold, Lake McRee, Gavin Meyer, Elijah Paige, Kamari Ramsey; WASHINGTON: Denzel Boston, Jonah Coleman, Thaddeus Dixon, Keleki Latu, Alphonzo Tuputala, Sebastian Valdez; WISCONSIN: Atticus Bertrams, Ricardo Hallman, Jack Nelson, Tawee Walker, Hunter Wohler.

Position	Player	Team
First Team Offense (Media)
QB	Dillon Gabriel	Oregon
RB	Kaleb Johnson	Iowa
RB	Kyle Monangai	Rutgers
WR	Tai Felton	Maryland
WR	Jeremiah Smith	Ohio State
TE	Tyler Warren	Penn State
C	Logan Jones	Iowa
OG	Connor Colby	Iowa
OG	Donovan Jackson	Ohio State
OT	Aireontae Ersery	Minnesota
OT	Josh Conerly Jr.	Oregon
First Team Defense (Media)
DL	Mikail Kamara	Indiana
DL	Mason Graham	Michigan
DL	Abdul Carter	Penn State
DL	Matayo Uiagalelei	Oregon
LB	Aiden Fisher	Indiana
LB	Jay Higgins	Iowa
LB	Carson Schwesinger	UCLA
LB	Cody Simon	Ohio State
DB	D'Angelo Ponds	Indiana
DB	Koi Perich	Minnesota
DB	Caleb Downs	Ohio State
DB	Xavier Scott	Illinois
First Team Special Teams (Media)
PK	Dominic Zvada	Michigan
P	Eddie Czaplicki	USC
RS	Kaden Wetjen	Iowa
LS	Luke Basson	Oregon

Position	Player	Team
Second Team Offense (Media)
QB	Kurtis Rourke	Indiana
RB	Jordan James	Oregon
RB	Woody Marks	USC
WR	Pat Bryant	Illinois
WR	Tez Johnson	Oregon
TE	Colston Loveland	Michigan
C	Seth McLaughlin	Ohio State
OG	Olaivavega Ioane	Penn State
OG	Emmanuel Pregnon	USC
OT	Hollin Pierce	Rutgers
OT	Ajani Cornelius	Oregon
Second Team Defense (Media)
DL	Kenneth Grant	Michigan
DL	Josaiah Stewart	Michigan
DL	JT Tuimoloau	Ohio State
DL	Derrick Harmon	Oregon
LB	Bryce Boettcher	Oregon
LB	Kobe King	Penn State
LB	Cody Lindenberg	Minnesota
DB	Jaylen Reed	Penn State
DB	Will Johnson	Michigan
DB	Lathan Ransom	Ohio State
DB	Jabbar Muhammad	Oregon
Second Team Special Teams (Media)
PK	Jonathan Kim	Michigan State
P	Rhys Dakin	Iowa
RS	Koi Perich	Minnesota
LS	Luke Elkin	Iowa

Position	Player	Team
Third Team Offense (Media)
QB	Will Howard	Ohio State
RB	Kalel Mullings	Michigan
RB	Jonah Coleman	Washington
WR	Elijah Sarratt	Indiana
WR	Emeka Egbuka	Ohio State
TE	Terrance Ferguson	Oregon
C	Mike Katic	Indiana
OG	Josh Priebe	Michigan
OG	Sal Wormley	Penn State
OT	Gennings Dunker	Iowa
OT	Ajani Cornelius	Oregon
Third Team Defense (Media)
DL	Gabe Jacas	Illinois
DL	Ty Robinson	Nebraska
DL	Jordan Burch	Oregon
DL	Jack Sawyer	Ohio State
LB	Carson Bruener	Washington
LB	Kydran Jenkins	Purdue
LB	Dariel Djabome	Rutgers
DB	Sebastian Castro	Iowa
DB	Jermari Harris	Iowa
DB	A.J. Harris	Penn State
DB	Denzel Burke	Ohio State
Third Team Special Teams (Media)
PK	Drew Stevens	Iowa
P	Ryan Eckley	Michigan State
RS	Hank Beatty	Illinois
LS	Tyler Duzansky	Penn State

Media Honorable Mention: ILLINOIS: Luke Altmyer, Matthew Bailey, J.C. Davis, Lane Hansen, Josh Kreutz, Dylan Rosiek; INDIANA: Shawn Asbury II, James Carpenter, Lanell Carr Jr., Justice Ellison, Zach Horton, Mark Langston, Myles Price, Nico Radicic, Carter Smith, Jailin Walker, CJ West; IOWA: Yahya Black, Deontae Craig, Aaron Graves, Ethan Hurkett, Nick Jackson, Quinn Schulte, Beau Stephens, Luke Lachey, Mason Richman; MARYLAND: Ruben Hyppolite II, Bryce McFerson, Glendon Miller, Dante Trader Jr.; MICHIGAN : Giovanni El-Hadi, Ernest Hausmann, Myles Hinton, William Wagner; MICHIGAN STATE: Khris Bogle, Charles Brantley, Luke Newman, Jordan Turner; MINNESOTA: Maverick Baranowski, Quinn Carroll, Tyler Cooper, Mark Crawford, Daniel Jackson, Jah Joyner, Dragan Kesich, Jalen Logan-Redding, Ethan Robinson, Anthony Smith, Alan Soukup, Danny Striggow, Darius Taylor, Justin Walley; NEBRASKA: John Bullock, Brian Buschini, Malcolm Hartzog Jr., Nash Hutmacher, Ben Scott, DeShon Singleton; NORTHWESTERN: AJ Henning, Aidan Hubbard, Theran Johnson, Xander Mueller, Josh Thompson, Caleb Tiernan, Devin Turner, Mac Uihlein; OHIO STATE: John Ferlmann, Josh Fryar, Ty Hamilton, Jordan Hancock, Davison Igbinosun, Quinshon Judkins, Jack Sawyer, Drew Shelton, Sonny Styles, Tyliek Williams; OREGON: Jeff Bassa, Jamaree Caldwell, Marcus Harper II, Ross James, Brandon Johnson, Tez Johnson, Tysheem Johnson, Iapani Laloulu, Nikko Reed, Teitum Tuioti; PENN STATE: Drew Allar, Kaytron Allen, Ryan Barker, Nick Dawkins, Dani Dennis-Sutton, Anthony Donkoh, Zane Durant, DVon J-Thomas, Jalen Kimber, Drew Shelton, Nicholas Singleton, Harrison Wallace III, Zakee Wheatley; PURDUE: Cole Brevard, Keelan Crimmins, Gus Hartwig, Max Klare, Dillon Thieneman; RUTGERS: Kwabena Asamoah, Kyonte Hamilton, Aaron Lewis, Robert Longerbeam, Shaquan Loyal, Tyreem Powell, Austin Riggs, Gus Zilinskas; UCLA: Kain Medrano, Kaylin Moore, Jay Toia; USC: Mason Cobb, Makai Lemon, Easton Mascarenas-Arnold, Jonah Monheim, Hank Pepper, Kamari Ramsey, Jaylin Smith; WASHINGTON: Denzel Boston; WISCONSIN: Atticus Bertrams, Ricardo Hallman, Joe Huber, Jack Nelson, Tawee Walker, Hunter Wohler.

== Home attendance ==
Team	Stadium	Capacity	Game 1	Game 2	Game 3	Game 4	Game 5	Game 6	Game 7	Game 8	Total	Average	% of capacity
Illinois	Memorial Stadium	60,670	43,849	**60,670†**	51,498	55,815	**60,670**	58,088	52,660	–	383,250	54,750	90.2%
Indiana	Memorial Stadium	52,626	44,150	39,082	48,323	**53,082†**	**53,082**	**53,082**	**53,082**	–	343,883	49,126	93.35%
Iowa	Kinnick Stadium	69,250	**69,250†**	**69,250**	**69,250**	**69,250**	**69,250**	**69,250**	**69,250**	–	484,750	69,250	100.0%
Maryland	SECU Stadium	51,802	35,421	34,819	39,371	39,371	43,013†	31,433	30,214	–	253,642	36,235	69.9%
Michigan	Michigan Stadium	107,601	**110,665**	**111,170†**	**110,250**	**110,340**	**110,849**	**110,576**	**109,830**	–	773,680	110,526	102.7%
Michigan State	Spartan Stadium	75,005	70,271	70,066	**71,114**†	69,682	68,423	57,558	50,038	–	457,152	65,307	87.07%
Minnesota	Huntington Bank Stadium	50,805	**50,805**	41,006	44,534	**52,048**†	**50,913**	48,696	44,266	–	332,268	47,467	93.4%
Nebraska	Memorial Stadium	85,458	**86,072**	**86,906**	**86,546**	**87,464**†	**87,453**	**86,923**	–	–	521,364	86,894	101.7%
Northwestern	Northwestern Medicine Field at Martin Stadium (Note: Temporary stadium to be used during the construction of the new Ryan Field, set to open in 2026.)	12,000	**12,023**†	11,062	10,631	**12,023**	**12,023**	38,147 (Note: Game to be played at Wrigley Field. Its listed capacity for baseball is 41,649, but does not reflect changes for football.)	26,378	–	122,287	17,470	n/a
Ohio State	Ohio Stadium	102,780	102,011	102,665	**105,135**	**104,830**	**103,463**	**105,751**	**106,005**†	**102,819**	832,679	104,085	101.3%
Oregon	Autzen Stadium	54,000	**57,435**	**58,134**	**59,802**	**60,129†**	**59,830**	**59,245**	**59,603**	–	414,178	59,168	109.6%
Penn State	Beaver Stadium	106,572	103,861	**109,526**	**109,911**	**110,047**	**111,030†**	**110,233**	104,044	106,013	864,665	108,379	101.7%
Purdue	Ross–Ade Stadium	61,441	59,488	**61,441†**	**61,441**	57,463	61,141	58,346	–	–	359,320	59,887	97.5%
Rutgers	SHI Stadium	52,454	47,803	41,021	**54,079**†	50,111	**53,726**	44,120	47,524	–	338,384	48,341	92.2%
UCLA	Rose Bowl	80,816	47,811†	43,051	42,012	53,467	59,473	35,018	–	–	280,832	46,805	57.92%
USC	Los Angeles Memorial Coliseum	77,500	68,110	74,118	72,250	63,404	**75,304**†	73,241	–	–	426,427	71,071	91.7%
Washington	Husky Stadium	70,138	66,984	64,222	**72,132**†	**71,251**	68,811	–	–	–	343,400	68,680	97.9%
Wisconsin	Camp Randall Stadium	76,057	75,158	**76,069**	**76,323†**	**76,091**	**76,403**†	**76,298**	**76,059**	–	532,401	76,057	100.0%
Conference		72,646 (Note: Northwestern's attendance figures are accounted for in totals and averages, however, considering the season was played in temporary venues in 2024, capacity figures are ignored.)									7,855,730	65,464	94.45% (Note: Northwestern's attendance figures are accounted for in totals and averages, however, considering the season was played in temporary venues in 2024, capacity figures are ignored.)

Bold – At or Exceed capacity
†Season High

== 2025 NFL draft ==
Team	Round 1	Round 2	Round 3	Round 4	Round 5	Round 6	Round 7	Total
Illinois	–	–	1	–	–	–	–	1
Indiana	–	–	–	1	–	–	1	2
Iowa	–	–	1	–	1	–	3	5
Maryland	–	–	1	1	2	–	2	6
Michigan	3	1	1	–	–	2	–	7
Michigan State	–	–	–	–	–	1	–	1
Minnesota	–	1	1	–	–	–	1	3
Nebraska	–	–	–	1	–	–	1	2
Northwestern	–	–	–	–	–	–	–	–
Ohio State	4	3	–	3	3	1	–	14
Oregon	2	1	3	–	2	1	1	10
Penn State	2	–	1	–	–	2	–	5
Purdue	–	–	–	–	1	–	–	1
Rutgers	–	–	–	–	–	1	2	3
UCLA	–	2	–	–	–	1	2	5
USC	–	–	1	1	–	–	1	3
Washington	–	–	–	–	–	–	1	1
Wisconsin	–	–	–	–	–	–	2	2

The following list includes all Big Ten players who were drafted in the 2025 NFL draft

*	compensatory selection
×	#2020 Resolution JC-2A picks selection

Rnd.	Pick	Team	Player	Pos.	College	Notes
1	3	New York Giants	Abdul Carter	DE	Penn State	
1	5	Cleveland Browns	Mason Graham	DT	Michigan	from Jacksonville (Note: No. 2: Cleveland → Jacksonville (D). Cleveland traded first-, fourth- and sixth-round selections (2nd, 104th and 200th overall) to Jacksonville in exchange for first-, second-, fourth-round selections (5th, 36th, and 126th overall) and a first-round selection in the 2026 NFL draft.)
1	10	Chicago Bears	Colston Loveland	TE	Michigan	
1	13	Miami Dolphins	Kenneth Grant	DT	Michigan	
1	14	Indianapolis Colts	Tyler Warren	TE	Penn State	
1	19	Tampa Bay Buccaneers	Emeka Egbuka	WR	Ohio State	
1	21	Pittsburgh Steelers	Derrick Harmon	DT	Oregon	
1	24	Minnesota Vikings	Donovan Jackson	G	Ohio State	
1	28	Detroit Lions	Tyleik Williams	DT	Ohio State	
1	29	Washington Commanders	Josh Conerly Jr.	T	Oregon	
1	32	Kansas City Chiefs	Josh Simmons	T	Ohio State	from Philadelphia (Note: No. 31: Kansas City → Philadelphia (D). Kansas City traded a first-round selection (31st overall) to Philadelphia in exchange for first- and fifth-round selections (32nd and 164th overall).)
2	33	Cleveland Browns	Carson Schwesinger	LB	UCLA	
2	36	Cleveland Browns	Quinshon Judkins	RB	Ohio State	from Jacksonville (Note: No. 36: Jacksonville → Cleveland (D). See Round 1: Cleveland → Jacksonville.)
2	38	New England Patriots	TreVeyon Henderson	RB	Ohio State	
2	45	Indianapolis Colts	JT Tuimoloau	DE	Ohio State	
2	46	Los Angeles Rams	Terrance Ferguson	TE	Oregon	from Atlanta (Note: No. 26: LA Rams → Atlanta (D). LA Rams traded first- and third-round selection (26th and 101st overall) to Atlanta in exchange for second- and seventh-round selections (46th and 242th overall) and a first-round selection in the 2026 NFL draft.)
2	47	Arizona Cardinals	Will Johnson	CB	Michigan	
2	48	Houston Texans	Aireontae Ersery	T	Minnesota	from Miami via Las Vegas
2	52	Tennessee Titans	Oluwafemi Oladejo	DE	UCLA	from Pittsburgh via Seattle (Note: No. 52: Pittsburgh → Seattle (PD). Pittsburgh traded second- and seventh-round selections (52nd and 223rd overall) to Seattle in exchange for a sixth-round selection (185th overall) and WR DK Metcalf.)
3	74	Denver Broncos	Pat Bryant	WR	Illinois	from Carolina
3	78	Arizona Cardinals	Jordan Burch	DE	Oregon	
3	80	Indianapolis Colts	Justin Walley	CB	Minnesota	
3	82	Tennessee Titans	Kevin Winston Jr.	S	Penn State	from Seattle
3	83	Pittsburgh Steelers	Kaleb Johnson	RB	Iowa	
3	86	Los Angeles Chargers	Jamaree Caldwell	DT	Oregon	
3	90	Los Angeles Rams	Josaiah Stewart	DE	Michigan	
3	94	Cleveland Browns	Dillon Gabriel	QB	Oregon	from Buffalo (Note: No. 94: Buffalo → Cleveland (PD). Buffalo traded a third-round selection (94th overall) and a 2026 seventh-round selection to Cleveland in exchange for a sixth-round selection (204th overall) and WR Amari Cooper.)
3*	97	Houston Texans	Jaylin Smith	CB	USC	from Minnesota
3×	102	Minnesota Vikings	Tai Felton	WR	Maryland	2020 Resolution JC-2A selection, (Note: Detroit received a third-round selection (102nd overall) after NY Jets hired former Lions defensive coordinator Aaron Glenn as head coach.) from Detroit via Jacksonville and Houston
4	111	Philadelphia Eagles	Ty Robinson	DT	Nebraska	from Carolina via Denver
4	113	San Francisco 49ers	CJ West	DT	Indiana	
4	115	Arizona Cardinals	Cody Simon	LB	Ohio State	
4	116	Houston Texans	Woody Marks	RB	USC	from Miami
4	122	Carolina Panthers	Lathan Ransom	S	Ohio State	from Denver
4	123	Pittsburgh Steelers	Jack Sawyer	DE	Ohio State	
4	132	Chicago Bears	Ruben Hyppolite II	LB	Maryland	from Buffalo
5	143	Miami Dolphins	Jordan Phillips	DT	Maryland	from Las Vegas
5	147	San Francisco 49ers	Jordan James	RB	Oregon	from New Orleans via Washington (Note: No. 93: Washington → New Orleans (PD). Washington traded third-, fourth- and sixth-round selections (93rd, 131st and 184th overall) to New Orleans in exchange for a fifth-round selection (147th overall) and CB Marshon Lattimore.)
5	148	Los Angeles Rams	Ty Hamilton	DL	Ohio State	from Chicago
5	154	New York Giants	Marcus Mbow	G	Purdue	from Seattle (Note: No. 154: Seattle → NY Giants (PD). Seattle traded a fifth-round selection (154th overall) and a 2024 second-round selection to NY Giants in exchange for DL Leonard Williams.)
5	155	Miami Dolphins	Dante Trader	S	Maryland	from Denver (Note: No. 155: Denver → Miami (PD). Denver traded a fifth-round selection (155th overall) and LB Bradley Chubb to Miami in exchange for a 2023 first-round selection, a 2024 fourth-round selection and RB Chase Edmonds.)
5	156	Kansas City Chiefs	Jeffrey Bassa	LB	Oregon	from Pittsburgh
5	164	Pittsburgh Steelers	Yahya Black	DT	Iowa	from Detroit via Cleveland and Philadelphia (Note: No. 164: Detroit → Cleveland → Philadelphia → Kansas City. Multiple trades: Detroit → Cleveland (PD). Detroit traded a fifth-round selection (164th overall) and a 2026 sixth-round selection to Cleveland in exchange for a 2026 seventh-round selection and DE Za'Darius Smith. Cleveland → Philadelphia (PD). Cleveland traded a fifth-round selection (164th overall) and QB Dorian Thompson-Robinson to Philadelphia in exchange for QB Kenny Pickett. Philadelphia → Kansas City (D). See Round 1: Kansas City → Philadelphia.)
5*	170	Buffalo Bills	Jordan Hancock	CB	Ohio State	from Dallas (Note: No. 170: Dallas → Buffalo (PD). Dallas traded a fifth-round selection (170th overall) and a 2026 seventh-round selection to Buffalo in exchange for a sixth-round selection (204th overall) and CB Kaiir Elam.)
5*	174	Arizona Cardinals	Denzel Burke	CB	Ohio State	from Dallas
6	185	Pittsburgh Steelers	Will Howard	QB	Ohio State	from Chicago via Seattle (Note: No. 185: Chicago → Seattle → Pittsburgh. Multiple trades: Chicago → Seattle (PD). Chicago traded a sixth-round selection (185th overall) to Seattle in exchange for LB Darrell Taylor. Seattle → Pittsburgh (PD). See Round 2: Pittsburgh → Seattle.)
6	187	Houston Texans	Jaylen Reed	S	Penn State	from San Francisco via Minnesota (Note: No. 187: San Francisco → Minnesota (PD). See Round 5: Minnesota → San Francisco.)
6	188	Tennessee Titans	Kalel Mullings	RB	Michigan	from Dallas (Note: No. 188: Dallas → Tennessee (PD). Dallas traded a sixth-round selection (188th overall) to Tennessee in exchange for a seventh-round selection (239th overall) and RB Kenneth Murray.)
6	191	Philadelphia Eagles	Myles Hinton	T	Michigan	from Arizona via Denver (Note: No. 191: Arizona → Denver (PD). Arizona traded a sixth-round selection (191st overall) to Denver in exchange for LB Baron Browning.)
6	195	Chicago Bears	Luke Newman	G	Michigan State	from Los Angeles via Pittsburgh (Note: No. 162: LA Rams → Pittsburgh → NY Jets. Multiple trades: LA Rams → Pittsburgh (PD). LA Rams traded a fifth-round selection (162nd overall) and a 2024 fourth-round selection to Pittsburgh in exchange for a sixth-round selection (195th overall), a 2024 fifth-round selection and G Kevin Dotson. Pittsburgh → NY Jets (PD). Pittsburgh traded a fifth-round selection (162nd overall) to NY Jets in exchange for WR Mike Williams.)
6	201	Minnesota Vikings	Kobe King	LB	Penn State	
6	204	Dallas Cowboys	Ajani Cornelius	T	Oregon	from Detroit via Cleveland and Buffalo (Note: No. 171: Dallas → New England (PD). Dallas traded a fifth-round selection (171st overall) to New England in exchange for a seventh-round selection (217th overall) and QB Joe Milton.)
6	205	Washington Commanders	Kain Medrano	LB	UCLA	
6*	212	Baltimore Ravens	Robert Longerbeam	CB	Rutgers	
7	217	Dallas Cowboys	Jay Toia	DT	UCLA	from Tennessee via New England (Note: No. 217: Tennessee → New England → Dallas (PD). Multiple trades: Tennessee → New England (PD). Tennessee traded a seventh-round selection (217th overall) to New England in exchange for K Nick Folk. New England → Dallas (PD). See Round 5: Dallas → New England.)
7	218	Atlanta Falcons	Jack Nelson	T	Wisconsin	from Cleveland via LA Chargers (Note: No. 218: Cleveland → LA Chargers → Atlanta. Multiple trades: Cleveland → LA Chargers (PD). Cleveland traded a seventh-round selection (218th overall) to the LA Chargers in exchange for K Dustin Hopkins. LA Chargers → Atlanta (PD). LA Chargers traded a conditional seventh-round selection (218th overall) to Atlanta in exchange for QB Taylor Heinicke.)
7	219	New York Giants	Thomas Fidone	TE	Nebraska	
7	221	Jacksonville Jaguars	Jonah Monheim	C	USC	
7	222	Las Vegas Raiders	Cody Lindenberg	LB	Minnesota	
7	224	Houston Texans	Kyonte Hamilton	DT	Rutgers	from Chicago (Note: No. 192: Miami → Chicago → Cleveland. Multiple trades: Miami → Chicago (PD). Miami traded a sixth-round selection (192nd overall) to Chicago in exchange for a seventh-round selection (224th overall) and WR Chase Claypool. Chicago → Cleveland (PD). Chicago traded a sixth-round selection (192nd overall) to Cleveland in exchange for a seventh-round selection (240th overall) and DT Chris Williams.)
7	226	Pittsburgh Steelers	Carson Bruener	LB	Washington	from Carolina (Note: No. 226: Carolina → Kansas City (PD). Carolina traded a conditional seventh-round selection (226th overall) to Kansas City in exchange for a conditional seventh-round selection (247th overall) and WR Ihmir Smith-Marsette.)
7	227	San Francisco 49ers	Kurtis Rourke	QB	Indiana	
7	232	Indianapolis Colts	Hunter Wohler	S	Wisconsin	
7	233	Chicago Bears	Kyle Monangai	RB	Rutgers	from Cincinnati (Note: No. 233: Cincinnati → Chicago (PD). Cincinnati traded a seventh-round selection (233rd overall) to Chicago in exchange for RB Khalil Herbert.)
7	234	Seattle Seahawks	Mason Richman	T	Iowa	
7	235	Tampa Bay Buccaneers	Tez Johnson	WR	Oregon	
7	240	Buffalo Bills	Kaden Prather	WR	Maryland	from Minnesota via Cleveland and Chicago (Note: No. 139: Cleveland → Minnesota (PD). Cleveland traded a fifth-round selection (139th overall) and a 2024 fifth-round selection to Minnesota in exchange for sixth and seventh-round selections (200th and 240th overall), and DE Za'Darius Smith.)
7	247	Dallas Cowboys	Tommy Akingbesote	DT	Maryland	from Kansas City via Carolina (Note: No. 114: Dallas → Carolina (PD). Dallas traded a fourth-round selection (114th overall) to Carolina in exchange for a seventh-round selection (247th overall) and WR Jonathan Mingo.)
7	248	New Orleans Saints	Moliki Matavao	TE	UCLA	from Philadelphia via Washington (Note: No. 79: Miami → Philadelphia → Washington. Multiple trades: Miami → Philadelphia (PD). Miami traded a third-round selection (79th overall) to Philadelphia in exchange for a 2024 fourth-round selection (120th overall). Philadelphia → Washington (PD). Philadelphia traded a conditional third-round selection (79th overall) and two seventh-round selections (236th and 248th overall) to Washington in exchange for a fifth-round selection (165th overall) and WR Jahan Dotson. The condition – that Washington would receive the higher of Miami or Philadelphia's third-round selection in 2025 – was converted on December 8, 2024, when the Eagles clinched a playoff spot, ensuring the Dolphins' pick was higher than the Eagles' own. Washington → Houston (PD). Washington traded third- and seventh-round selections (79th and 236th overall), and 2026 second- and fourth-round selections to Houston in exchange for a fourth-round selection (128th overall) and T Laremy Tunsil.)
7*	249	San Francisco 49ers	Connor Colby	G	Iowa	
7*	255	Houston Texans	Luke Lachey	TE	Iowa	from Cleveland (Note: No. 56: Minnesota → Houston → Buffalo. Multiple trades: Minnesota → Houston (PD). Minnesota traded a second-round selection (56th overall), and 2024 second- and sixth-round selections to Houston in exchange for 2024 first- and seventh-round selections. Houston → Buffalo (PD). Houston traded a second-round selection (56th overall) to Buffalo in exchange for a fifth-round selection (166th overall), a 2024 sixth-round selection and WR Stefon Diggs.)

Trades In the explanations below, (PD) indicates trades completed prior to the start of the draft (i.e. Pre-Draft), while (D) denotes trades that took place during the 2022 draft.

== Head coaches ==
Current as of January 20, 2025

Team	Head coach	Years at school	Overall record	Record at school	B1G record
Illinois	Bret Bielema (Note: Bret Bielema coached in the Big Ten from 2006 through 2012 at Wisconsin, going 37–19 in Big Ten play and winning three Big Ten championships.)	4	125–80 (.610)	28–22 (.560)	55–37 (.598)
Indiana	Curt Cignetti	1	130–37 (.778)	11–2 (.846)	8–1 (.889)
Iowa	Kirk Ferentz	26	216–145 (.598)	204–124 (.622)	128–88 (.593)
Iowa	Seth Wallace (interim) (Note: Seth Wallace served as interim head coach for the 2024 season opener against Illinois State as head coach Kirk Ferentz served a one-game suspension.)	1	1–0 (1.000)	1–0 (1.000)	0–0 (–)
Maryland	Mike Locksley (Note: Mike Locksley served as interim head coach at Maryland in 2015 and coached for six games, going 1–5.)	6	35–67 (.343)	33–41 (.446)	16–40 (.286)
Michigan	Sherrone Moore	1	9–5 (.643)	9–5 (.643)	5–4 (.556)
Michigan State	Jonathan Smith	1	39–42 (.481)	5–7 (.417)	3–6 (.333)
Minnesota	P. J. Fleck	8	88–61 (.591)	58–39 (.598)	34–36 (.486)
Nebraska	Matt Rhule	2	59–56 (.513)	12–13 (.480)	6–12 (.333)
Northwestern	David Braun (Note: Pat Fitzgerald was relieved as head coach on July 10, 2023, after allegations of hazing within the Wildcat football program surfaced.) (Note: David Braun was named interim head coach on July 14, 2023.)	2	12–13 (.480)	12–13 (.480)	7–11 (.389)
Ohio State	Ryan Day (Note: Ryan Day served as interim head coach at Ohio State for the first three games of the 2018 season while Urban Meyer served a three-game suspension and went 3–0.)	6	70–10 (.875)	70–10 (.875)	46–5 (.902)
Oregon	Dan Lanning	3	35–6 (.854)	35–6 (.854)	10–0 (1.000)
Penn State	James Franklin	11	125–57 (.687)	101–42 (.706)	64–33 (.660)
Purdue	Ryan Walters	2	5–19 (.208)	5–19 (.208)	3–15 (.167)
Rutgers	Greg Schiano (Note: Greg Schiano served as head coach at Rutgers from 2001 through 2011 then left for the NFL. Following the conclusion of the 2019 season, Schiano returned to Rutgers for his second stint as head coach. The Scarlet Knights competed in the Big East Conference in his previous stay at the school.)	16	94–101 (.482)	94–101 (.482)	13–32 (.289)
UCLA	DeShaun Foster	1	5–7 (.417)	5–7 (.417)	3–6 (.333)
USC	Lincoln Riley	3	81–24 (.771)	26–14 (.650)	4–5 (.444)
Washington	Jedd Fisch	1	23–29 (.442)	6–7 (.462)	4–5 (.444)
Wisconsin	Luke Fickell (Note: Luke Fickell served as interim head coach at Ohio State in 2011, going 6-7 overall and 3-5 in the Big Ten. Fickell took over as coach of Wisconsin for the 2022 Guaranteed Rate Bowl)	2	76–38 (.667)	13–13 (.500)	11–15 (.423)
