= 2024 All-Big Ten Conference football team =

College football honor

The 2024 All-Big Ten Conference football team consists of American football players chosen as All-Big Ten Conference players for the 2024 Big Ten Conference football season. The conference recognizes two official All-Big Ten selectors: (1) the Big Ten conference coaches selected separate offensive and defensive units and named first-, second- and third-team players (the "Coaches" team); and (2) a panel of sports writers and broadcasters covering the Big Ten also selected offensive and defensive units and named first-, second- and third-team players (the "Media" team).

== Key ==
Bold = Consensus first-team selection by both the coaches and media

Coaches = Selected by the Big Ten Conference coaches

Media = Selected by the conference media

== Offensive selections ==
=== Quarterbacks ===
- **Dillon Gabriel**, Oregon (Coaches-1; Media-1)
- Kurtis Rourke, Indiana (Coaches-2; Media-2)
- Will Howard, Ohio State (Coaches-3; Media-3)

=== Running backs ===
- **Kaleb Johnson**, Iowa (Coaches-1; Media-1)
- **Kyle Monangai**, Rutgers (Coaches-1; Media-1)
- Jordan James, Oregon (Coaches-2; Media-2)
- Woody Marks, USC (Coaches-2; Media-2)
- Jonah Coleman, Washington (Media-3)
- TreVeyon Henderson, Ohio State (Coaches-3)
- Quinshon Judkins, Ohio State (Coaches-3)
- Kalel Mullings, Michigan (Media-3)

=== Wide receivers ===
- **Tai Felton**, Maryland (Coaches-1; Media-1)
- **Jeremiah Smith**, Ohio State (Coaches-1; Media-1)
- Pat Bryant, Illinois (Coaches-2; Media-2)
- Tez Johnson, Oregon (Coaches-2; Media-2)
- Emeka Egbuka, Ohio State (Coaches-3; Media-3)
- Elijah Sarratt, Indiana (Coaches-3; Media-3)

=== Centers ===
- Logan Jones, Iowa (Coaches-2; Media-1)
- Seth McLaughlin, Ohio State (Coaches-1; Media-2)
- Mike Katic, Indiana (Coaches-3)
- Jonah Monheim, USC (Media-3)

=== Guards ===
- **Donovan Jackson**, Ohio State (Coaches-1; Media-1)
- **Connor Colby**, Iowa (Coaches-1; Media-1)
- Olaivavega Ioane, Penn State (Coaches-2; Media-2)
- Emmanuel Pregnon, USC (Coaches-2; Media-2)
- Marcus Harper II, Oregon (Coaches-3)
- Joe Huber, Wisconsin (Coaches-3)
- Josh Priebe, Michigan (Media-3)
- Sal Wormley, Penn State (Media-3)

=== Tackles ===
- **Josh Conerly Jr.**, Oregon (Coaches-1; Media-1)
- **Aireontae Ersery**, Minnesota (Coaches-1; Media-1)
- Hollin Pierce, Rutgers (Coaches-2; Media-2)
- Ajani Cornelius, Oregon (Coaches-3; Media-2)
- Gennings Dunker, Iowa (Coaches-2; Media-3)
- J. C. Davis, Illinois (Coaches-3)
- Josh Simmons, Ohio State (Media-3)

=== Tight ends ===
- **Tyler Warren**, Penn State (Coaches-1; Media-1)
- Colston Loveland, Michigan (Coaches-2; Media-2)
- Terrance Ferguson, Oregon (Media-3)
- Max Klare, Purdue (Coaches-3)

== Defensive selections ==
=== Defensive linemen ===
- **Abdul Carter**, Penn State (Coaches-1; Media-1)
- **Mason Graham**, Michigan (Coaches-1; Media-1)
- **Mikail Kamara**, Indiana (Coaches-1; Media-1)
- JT Tuimoloau, Ohio State (Coaches-1; Media-2)
- Matayo Uiagalelei, Oregon (Coaches-2; Media-1)
- Kenneth Grant, Michigan (Coaches-2; Media-2)
- Josaiah Stewart, Michigan (Coaches-2; Media-2)
- Derrick Harmon, Oregon (Coaches-3; Media-2)
- Jack Sawyer, Ohio State (Coaches-2; Media-3)
- Jordan Burch, Oregon (Coaches-3; Media-3)
- Gabe Jacas, Illinois (Coaches-3; Media-3)
- Ty Robinson, Nebraska (Coaches-3; Media-3)
- Tyleik Williams, Ohio State (Coaches-3)

=== Linebackers ===
- **Aiden Fisher**, Indiana (Coaches-1; Media-1)
- **Jay Higgins**, Iowa (Coaches-1; Media-1)
- **Carson Schwesinger**, UCLA (Coaches-1; Media-1)
- Cody Lindenberg, Minnesota (Coaches-1; Media-2)
- Cody Simon, Ohio State (Coaches-3; Media-1)
- Bryce Boettcher, Oregon (Coaches-2; Media-2)
- Kobe King, Penn State (Coaches-2; Media-2)
- Sonny Styles, Ohio State (Coaches-2)
- Carson Bruener, Washington (Coaches-3; Media-3)
- Dariel Djabome, Rutgers (Media-3)
- Kydran Jenkins, Purdue (Media-3)
- Kain Medrano, UCLA (Coaches-3)

=== Defensive backs ===
- **Caleb Downs**, Ohio State (Coaches-1; Media-1)
- **D'Angelo Ponds**, Indiana (Coaches-1; Media-1)
- **Koi Perich**, Minnesota (Coaches-1; Media-1)
- Lathan Ransom, Ohio State (Coaches-1; Media-2)
- Xavier Scott, Illinois (Coaches-2; Media-1)
- Jaylen Reed, Penn State (Coaches-2; Media-2)
- Will Johnson, Michigan (Media-2)
- Theran Johnson, Northwestern (Coaches-2)
- Jabbar Muhammad, Oregon (Media-2)
- Justin Walley, Minnesota (Coaches-2)
- Sebastian Castro, Iowa (Coaches-3; Media-3)
- A. J. Harris, Penn State (Coaches-3; Media-3)
- Jermari Harris, Iowa (Coaches-3; Media-3)
- Denzel Burke, Ohio State (Media-3)
- Jaylin Smith, USC (Coaches-3)

== Special teams ==
=== Kickers ===
- **Dominic Zvada**, Michigan (Coaches-1; Media-1)
- Jonathan Kim, Michigan State (Coaches-2; Media-2)
- Drew Stevens, Iowa (Coaches-3; Media-3)

=== Punters ===
- **Eddie Czaplicki**, USC (Coaches-1; Media-1)
- Rhys Dakin, Iowa (Coaches-3; Media-2)
- Ryan Eckley, Michigan State (Coaches-2; Media-3)

=== Return specialist ===
- **Kaden Wetjen**, Iowa (Coaches-1; Media-1)
- Tez Johnson, Oregon (Coaches-2)
- Koi Perich, Minnesota (Media-2)
- Hank Beatty, Illinois (Media-3)
- Makai Lemon, USC (Coaches-3)

=== Long snapper ===
- Luke Basso, Oregon (Coaches-2; Media-1)
- William Wagner, Michigan (Coaches-1)
- Luke Elkin, Iowa (Media-2)
- Tyler Duzansky, Penn State (Media-3)
- Hank Pepper, USC (Coaches-3)
