= 2024 Big Ten Football Championship Game =

- Conference Championship
Penn State Nittany Lions	Oregon Ducks
(11–1)	(12–0)
37	45
Head coach: James Franklin	Head coach: Dan Lanning
AP / Coaches / CFP; 3 / 3 / 3	AP / Coaches / CFP; 1 / 1 / 1
	1	2	3	4	Total
Penn State	10	14	0	13	37
Oregon	14	17	7	7	45
- Date: December 7, 2024
- Season: 2024
- Stadium: Lucas Oil Stadium
- Location: Indianapolis, Indiana
- MVP: Tez Johnson, WR, Oregon
- Favorite: Oregon by 3.5
- Referee: Kole Knueppel
- Attendance: 67,469

United States TV coverage
- Network: CBS; Compass Media
- Announcers: CBS: Brad Nessler (play-by-play), Gary Danielson (color), and Jenny Dell (sideline); Compass Media: Gregg Daniels (play-by-play) and Chad Brown (color)

2024 Big Ten Conference football standings
	Conf.			Overall
Team	W		L	W		L
No. 3 Oregon y$^	9	–	0	13	–	1
No. 5 Penn State y^	8	–	1	13	–	3
No. 10 Indiana ^	8	–	1	11	–	2
No. 1 Ohio State #^	7	–	2	14	–	2
No. 16 Illinois	6	–	3	10	–	3
Iowa	6	–	3	8	–	5
Michigan	5	–	4	8	–	5
Minnesota	5	–	4	8	–	5
USC	4	–	5	7	–	6
Rutgers	4	–	5	7	–	6
Washington	4	–	5	6	–	7
Nebraska	3	–	6	7	–	6
UCLA	3	–	6	5	–	7
Wisconsin	3	–	6	5	–	7
Northwestern	2	–	7	4	–	8
Maryland	1	–	8	4	–	8
Michigan State†	0	–	6	0	–	7
Purdue	0	–	9	1	–	11
Championship: Oregon 45, Penn State 37
# – College Football Playoff champion; ^ – College Football Playoff participant; $ – Conference champion; y – Championship game participant; † — NCAA vacated all wins for Michigan State (5–7, 3–6); Rankings from AP Poll

The 2024 Big Ten Football Championship Game (officially known as the 2024 Discover Big Ten Football Championship Game for sponsorship reasons) was a college football game that was played on December 7, 2024, at Lucas Oil Stadium in Indianapolis, Indiana. It was the 14th edition of the Big Ten Football Championship Game and determined the champion of the conference for the 2024 season, as well as earning the winner an automatic bye to the quarterfinals of the 2024 College Football Playoff. The game began at 8:00 p.m. EST and aired on CBS. The game featured the Oregon Ducks and the Penn State Nittany Lions.

== Teams ==
The Big Ten eliminated divisions for the 2024 season and featured the two teams with the best overall conference record for the first time, those being Oregon and Penn State. This was the first Big Ten title game appearance for Oregon in its first season in the Big Ten, while it was Penn State's second.

This matchup was the fifth game between the two schools; they last played each other in the 1995 Rose Bowl, where the Nittany Lions defeated the Ducks 38–20.

This was the first Big Ten Championship game since 2020 to not feature the Michigan Wolverines, who previously appeared in three straight championship games.

=== Oregon Ducks ===
Oregon clinched a spot in the game following their defeat of Wisconsin on November 16. The Ducks entered the game as the last remaining undefeated team in the FBS, having achieved their first undefeated regular season since 2010.

=== Penn State Nittany Lions ===
Penn State clinched a spot in the game following Ohio State's upset loss to Michigan and the Nittany Lions' defeat of Maryland on November 30. Penn State made their first Big Ten Championship Game appearance since 2016, in which they defeated Wisconsin 38–31.

== Scoring summary ==
2024 Big 10 Championship Game
#1 Oregon Ducks (12–0, 9–0) vs. #3 Penn State Nittany Lions (11–1, 8–1)

Quarter	1	2	3	4	Total
No. 3 Penn State	10	14	0	13	37
No. 1 Oregon	14	17	7	7	45

at Lucas Oil Stadium • Indianapolis, IN

- Date: Saturday, December 7, 2024
- Game time: 7:00 p.m. CST
- Game attendance: 67,469
- Referee: Kole Knueppel
- TV announcers (CBS/Compass Media Network): Brad Nessler (play-by-play), Gary Danielson (color), and Jenny Dell (sideline)
  Compass Media: Gregg Daniels (play-by-play) and Chad Brown (color)

Statistics	PSU	UO
First downs	28	24
Plays–yards	74-518	75-466
Rushes–yards	297	186
Passing yards	226	283
Passing: comp–att–int	20-39-2	22-32-0
Time of possession	27:24	32:36

Team	Category	Player	Statistics
Penn State	Passing	Drew Allar	20/39, 226 yards, 3 TD, 2 INT
Penn State	Rushing	Kaytron Allen	14 carries, 124 yards, 1 TD
Penn State	Receiving	Tyler Warren	7 receptions, 84 yards
Oregon	Passing	Dillon Gabriel	22/32, 283 yards, 4 TD
Oregon	Rushing	Jordan James	20 carries, 87 yards, 2 TD
Oregon	Receiving	Tez Johnson	11 receptions, 181 yards, 1 TD

== See also ==
- List of Big Ten Conference football champions
