= Eddie Czaplicki =

American football player (born 2003)

- Czaplicki in 2023

Profile
- Position: Punter

Personal information
- Born: July 10, 2003 (age 23); Charlotte, North Carolina, U.S.
- Listed height: 6 ft 1 in (1.85 m)
- Listed weight: 200 lb (91 kg)

Career information
- High school: Providence (Charlotte)
- College: Arizona State (2021–2022); USC (2023–2024)
- NFL draft: 2025: undrafted

Career history
- Kansas City Chiefs (2025)*
- * Offseason or practice squad member only

Awards and highlights
- Ray Guy Award (2024); Big Ten Punter of the Year (2024); First-team All-American (2024); First-team All-Big Ten (2024); First-team All-Pac-12 (2022)

Edward Czaplicki (born July 10, 2003) is an American professional football punter. He played college football for the Arizona State Sun Devils and USC Trojans. He won the 2024 Ray Guy Award as the best college football punter nationally.

== Early life ==
Czaplicki is from Charlotte, North Carolina. He attended Providence High School in Charlotte, where he initially played both football and soccer before deciding to focus solely on football. A punter and placekicker, he averaged 46 yards per punt in 2019, which placed 13th nationally, and also made a 51-yard field goal that year, which was the second best in the nation. He was ranked a three-star recruit and the 11th-best kicker prospect nationally by 247Sports. He was also ranked the third-best kicker and ninth-best punter nationally by Kohl's kicking, being one of three in the class of 2021 to be in the top 10 in both categories. He committed to play college football for the Arizona State Sun Devils.

== College career ==
After initially competing for the placekicker job at Arizona State, Czaplicki switched to punter and won the starting nod as a true freshman. He punted 45 times with an average of 43.4 yards per punt, having 13 punts of at least 50 yards in the 2021 season. In 2022, he ranked ninth nationally with an average of 46.0 yards per punt and was named first-team All-Pac-12 Conference.

Czaplicki transferred to the USC Trojans following the 2022 season. With the Trojans in 2023, he served as punter and kickoff specialist, making 44 punts with an average of 43.3 yards per punt and 15 punts inside the 20, as well as 30 kickoffs for 1,906 yards. As a senior in 2024, Czaplicki had a net average of 45.7 yards per punt and had 24 punts inside the 20 with a long of 62. He was named first-team All-Big Ten Conference, the Big Ten Eddleman-Fields Punter of the Year, first-team All-American and the Ray Guy Award winner for best punter nationally.

== Professional career ==
Pre-draft measurables
Height	Weight	Arm length	Hand span
6 ft 0 7/8 in (1.85 m)	200 lb (91 kg)	29 1/2 in (0.75 m)	9 1/4 in (0.23 m)
All values from Pro Day

After going unselected in the 2025 NFL draft, Czaplicki signed with the Kansas City Chiefs as an undrafted free agent on May 3, 2025. He was waived on July 31.
