= Xavier Scott =

American football player (born 2002)

No. 1 – Illinois Fighting Illini
- Position: Defensive back
- Class: Redshirt Senior

Personal information
- Born: December 19, 2002 (age 23)
- Listed height: 5 ft 11 in (1.80 m)
- Listed weight: 195 lb (88 kg)

Career information
- High school: William T. Dwyer (Palm Beach Gardens, Florida)
- College: Illinois (2022–present)

Awards and highlights
- First-team All-Big Ten (2024)
- Stats at ESPN

Xavier Scott (born December 19, 2002) is an American college football safety for the Illinois Fighting Illini.

== Early life ==
Scott attended William T. Dwyer High School in Palm Beach Gardens, Florida. He was rated as a three-star recruit and committed to play college football for the Illinois Fighting Illini, choosing them over schools such as Air Force, FAU, and Pittsburgh.

== College career ==
In his first two collegiate seasons in 2022 and 2023, Scott appeared in 23 games where he notched 72 tackles, 12 pass deflections, two interceptions, and two forced fumbles for the Fighting Illini. In week 2 of the 2024 season, he notched eight tackles, a sack, a forced fumble, two interceptions, and a touchdown in a win over Kansas. For his performance during the 2024 season, Scott was named first-team all-Big Ten Conference, as well as being named a Jim Thorpe award semifinalist.
