= Kydran Jenkins =

American gridiron football player (born 2002)

- Jenkins with the Winnipeg Blue Bombers in 2026

No. 44 – Winnipeg Blue Bombers
- Position: Defensive lineman
- Roster status: Active
- CFL status: American

Personal information
- Born: July 3, 2002 (age 24); Louisville, Georgia, U.S.
- Listed height: 6 ft 0 in (1.83 m)
- Listed weight: 275 lb (125 kg)

Career information
- High school: Jefferson County (Louisville, Georgia)
- College: Purdue (2020–2024)
- NFL draft: 2025: undrafted

Career history
- Winnipeg Blue Bombers (2025–present)

Awards and highlights
- Third-team All-Big Ten (2024)
- Stats at ESPN

Kydran Jenkins (born July 3, 2002) is an American professional football defensive lineman for the Winnipeg Blue Bombers of the Canadian Football League (CFL). He played college football for the Purdue Boilermakers as a defensive end and linebacker.

== Early life ==
Jenkins attended Jefferson County High School in Louisville, Georgia. He was rated as a three-star recruit and committed to play college football for the Purdue Boilermakers over offers from schools such as Missouri, Western Kentucky, South Florida, Navy, Liberty and Tulane.

== College career ==
In 2021, Jenkins tallied 35 tackles with eight being for a loss, five sacks, and a pass deflections. In 2022, he recorded 32 tackles with eight being for a loss, four sacks, a pass deflection, and a forced fumble. In week 8 of the 2023 season, Jenkins recorded his first career collegiate touchdown off a fumble recovery versus Nebraska. He finished the season with 57 tackles with 15.5 being for a loss, seven and a half sacks, a pass deflection, two fumble recoveries, a forced fumble, and a touchdown, earning an all-Big Ten Conference honorable mention.

== Professional career ==
Pre-draft measurables
Height	Weight	Arm length	Hand span	Wingspan	40-yard dash	10-yard split	20-yard split	20-yard shuttle	Three-cone drill	Vertical jump	Broad jump
5 ft 11 3/4 in (1.82 m)	256 lb (116 kg)	31 1/2 in (0.80 m)	9 1/2 in (0.24 m)	6 ft 4 3/4 in (1.95 m)	4.60 s	1.65 s	2.75 s	4.41 s	7.32 s	28.0 in (0.71 m)	9 ft 9 in (2.97 m)
All values from Pro Day

On October 6, 2025, Jenkins was signed to the practice roster of the Winnipeg Blue Bombers of the Canadian Football League (CFL). He made his CFL debut in the regular season finale.
