= Ethan Hurkett =

American football player (born 2001)

Profile
- Position: Defensive end

Personal information
- Born: September 19, 2001 (age 25); Cedar Rapids, Iowa, U.S.
- Listed height: 6 ft 3 in (1.91 m)
- Listed weight: 259 lb (117 kg)

Career information
- High school: Xavier (Cedar Rapids, Iowa)
- College: Iowa (2020–2025)
- NFL draft: 2026: undrafted

Career history
- Kansas City Chiefs (2026)*
- * Offseason or practice squad member only

Ethan Hurkett (born September 19, 2001) is an American professional football defensive end. He played college football for the Iowa Hawkeyes.

== Early life ==
Hurkett was born on September 19, 2001, in Cedar Rapids, Iowa to Janelle and Edward Hurkett. Measuring 6 ft 2 in (1.88 m) and 230 pounds (100 kg), Hurkett played both middle and inside linebacker positions and fullback with the Xavier Lancers football team. During the course of his time in high school Hurkett earned numerous state, district, first team and MVP accolades. In his senior year, Hurkett served the Lancers as team captain. He was a three-year letterman in football and an honor roll student throughout his time in high school. During his senior season at Xavier in which he helped the Lancers win two state championships, Hurkett was named Defensive Player of the Year. He graduated in 2020 and was projected as a three-star recruiting prospect by 247Sports.com.

== College career ==
After redshirting the 2020 season, Hurkett joined the University of Iowa Hawkeyes as a defensive end for the 2021 season where he played in the first three games before sustaining a season-ending ACL injury. Hurkett's debut season totals included three tackles including one solo and two assists, one shared tackle for loss and one quarterback pressure. He received All-Big Ten honors.

During the 2022 season, Hurkett played in all 13 games, totalling 15 tackles with 10 solo and five assists, one sack one quarterback pressure. Hurkett received All-Big Ten honors for a second year. After playing in all 13, Hurkett finished the 2023 season with totals of 49 tackles including 25 solo and 24 assists, one interception, three quarterback pressures and one recovered fumble. He started in all 13 games of the 2024 season during which he totalled 56 tackles with 32 solo and 24 assists. He led the team with a total 11.5 tackles 6.5 sacks and two quarterback pressures and three forced fumbles. He ranked 12th in tackles 11.5 and 13th in quarterback sacks 6.5.

Returning for the 2025 season, Hurkett played starting defensive end in 13 games. During his final season, Hurkett served as team captain and totalled 36 tackles with 21 solo and 15 assists, eight quarterback sacks, two quarterback pressures, one blocked field goal, and one forced fumble.

== Professional career ==
Hurkett signed with the Kansas City Chiefs as an undrafted free agent following the 2026 NFL Draft. He was cut on May 4, 2026. Hurkett was later re-signed on August 1, following knee injuries sustained by Chiefs defensive end Ethan Downs and wide receiver Cyrus Allen. On August 30, he was waived by the Chiefs as a part of final roster cuts.
