= Dante Trader Jr. =

American football player (born 2003)

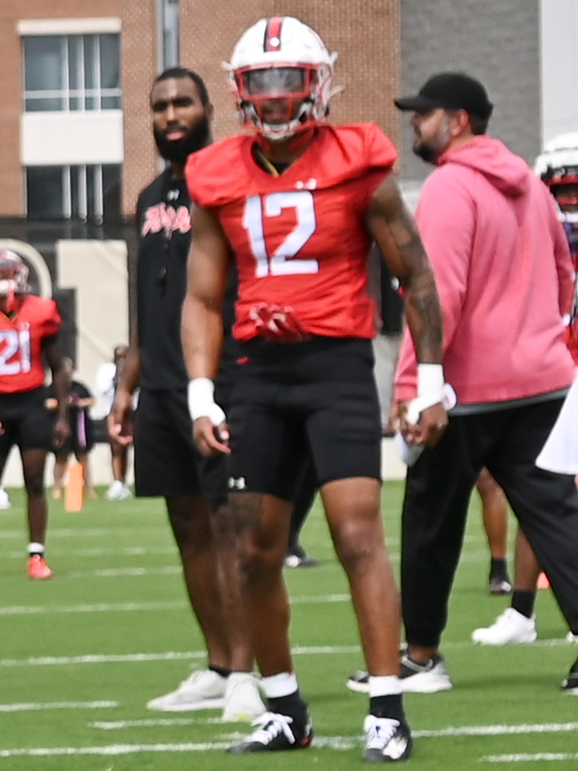
- Trader with the Maryland Terrapins in 2024

No. 11 – Miami Dolphins
- Position: Safety
- Roster status: Active

Personal information
- Born: February 13, 2003 (age 23); Delmar, Delaware, U.S.
- Listed height: 5 ft 11 in (1.80 m)
- Listed weight: 202 lb (92 kg)

Career information
- High school: McDonogh (Owings Mills, Maryland)
- College: Maryland (2021–2024)
- NFL draft: 2025: 5th round, 155th overall pick

Career history
- Miami Dolphins (2025–present)

Career NFL statistics as of Week 1, 2026
- Total tackles: 58
- Forced fumbles: 1
- Fumble recoveries: 1
- Pass deflections: 2
- Interceptions: 1
- Stats at Pro Football Reference

Dante Trader Jr. (born February 13, 2003) is an American professional football safety for the Miami Dolphins of the National Football League (NFL). He played college football for the Maryland Terrapins and was selected by the Dolphins in the fifth round of the 2025 NFL draft.

== Early life ==
Trader grew up in Delmar, Delaware and attended Delmar Senior High School before transferring to McDonogh School during his junior year. He committed to the University of Maryland, College Park on November 19, 2019.

== College career ==
Trader committed to Maryland to play in both lacrosse and football but, chose to play football instead of lacrosse for his freshman year. In his first season, Trader appeared in 12 out of the 13 games and had 16 total tackles (12 of which were solo), one tackle for loss, and one pass breakup. Trader returned to Maryland for his sophomore year and was expected to be a leader of the safeties group of the team with teammate Beau Brade. The stats for his sophomore year were 62 total tackles (34 solo), four defended passes, and two interceptions with 46 total yards for the interception returns. Following the regular season, Trader played in his first Bowl Game the 2022 Duke's Mayo Bowl. Following the bowl game, Trader announced that he was planning to join the Maryland Terrapins men's lacrosse team. In the lacrosse season, he had 14 turnovers caused by the team (third most on the team), 16 shots on the goal with a total of five goals and seven points, 17 groundballs, and four turnovers to the other team. For his junior year, he was again projected along with his teammate Brade to be leaders of the safeties group. In the regular season, Trader has had 52 total tackles (37 solo), two interceptions for 21 yards, and five pass deflections.

== Professional career ==
Pre-draft measurables
Height	Weight	Arm length	Hand span	Wingspan	40-yard dash	10-yard split	20-yard split	20-yard shuttle	Three-cone drill	Vertical jump	Broad jump	Bench press
5 ft 10 7/8 in (1.80 m)	196 lb (89 kg)	31 1/4 in (0.79 m)	8 7/8 in (0.23 m)	6 ft 3 1/8 in (1.91 m)	4.65 s	1.58 s	2.67 s	4.32 s	7.09 s	33.5 in (0.85 m)	9 ft 9 in (2.97 m)	16 reps
All values from NFL Combine/Pro Day

Trader was selected in the fifth round, with the 155th pick of the 2025 NFL draft by the Miami Dolphins.

== NFL career statistics ==
=== Regular season ===
Year	Team	Games		Tackles					Interceptions						Fumbles				
Year	Team	GP	GS	Cmb	Solo	Ast	Sck	TFL	Int	Yds	Avg	Lng	TD	PD	FF	Fmb	FR	Yds	TD
2025	MIA	17	3	55	29	26	0.0	0	0	0	0.0	0	0	1	1	0	1	0	0
Career		17	3	55	29	26	0.0	0	0	0	0.0	0	0	1	1	0	1	0	0
