= Robert Longerbeam =

American football player (born 2001)

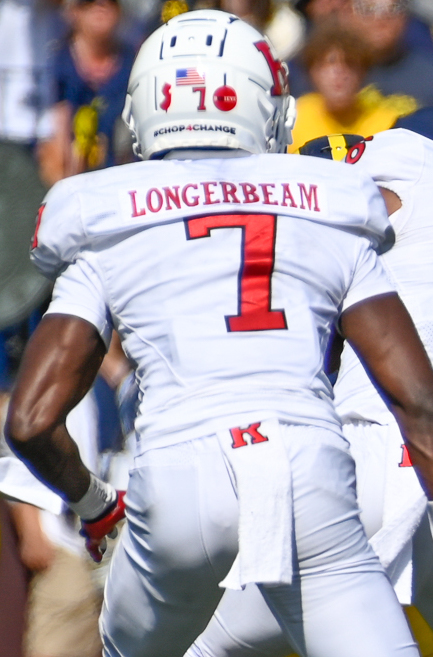
- Longerbeam with Rutgers in 2023

No. 37 – Atlanta Falcons
- Position: Cornerback
- Roster status: Active

Personal information
- Born: January 18, 2001 (age 25); Alexandria, Virginia, U.S.
- Listed height: 5 ft 11 in (1.80 m)
- Listed weight: 174 lb (79 kg)

Career information
- High school: T. C. Williams (Alexandria)
- College: Rutgers (2020–2024)
- NFL draft: 2025: 6th round, 212th overall pick

Career history
- Baltimore Ravens (2025); Philadelphia Eagles (2026)*; Atlanta Falcons (2026–present)
- * Offseason or practice squad member only
- Stats at Pro Football Reference

Robert Longerbeam (born January 18, 2001) is an American professional football cornerback for the Atlanta Falcons of the National Football League (NFL). He played college football for the Rutgers Scarlet Knights and was selected by the Ravens in the sixth round of the 2025 NFL draft.

== Early life ==
Longerbeam attended T. C. Williams High School in Alexandria, Virginia, where he ran track in addition to playing football. He was rated as a three-star recruit and committed to play college football for the Rutgers Scarlet Knights.

== College career ==
During Longerbeam's first two seasons in 2020 and 2021, he appeared in 18 total games, notching 30 tackles, ten pass deflections, and two forced fumbles. In 2022, he tallied 36 tackles with eight pass deflections and two interceptions in ten games while making six starts. In week 7 of the 2023 season, Longerbeam notched four tackles, two forced fumbles, and a fumble recovery in a win over Michigan State. He started every game for the Scarlet Knights that season, totaling 43 tackles with 11 pass deflections and an interception.

== Professional career ==
Pre-draft measurables
Height	Weight	Arm length	Hand span	Wingspan	40-yard dash	10-yard split	20-yard split	20-yard shuttle	Three-cone drill	Vertical jump	Broad jump
5 ft 11 in (1.80 m)	175 lb (79 kg)	31 1/2 in (0.80 m)	8 1/2 in (0.22 m)	6 ft 4 1/2 in (1.94 m)	4.39 s	1.50 s	2.59 s	4.25 s	6.76 s	36.5 in (0.93 m)	11 ft 2 in (3.40 m)
All values from NFL Combine/Pro Day

=== Baltimore Ravens ===
Longerbeam was selected by the Baltimore Ravens with the 212th overall pick in the sixth round of the 2025 NFL draft. He was placed on injured reserve on August 10, 2025, after suffering a knee injury in training camp.

On August 30, 2026, Longerbeam was waived by the Ravens as part of final roster cuts.

=== Philadelphia Eagles ===
On September 1, 2026, Longerbeam signed with the Philadelphia Eagles' practice squad.

=== Atlanta Falcons ===
On September 23, 2026, the Atlanta Falcons signed Longerbeam to their active roster off of the Eagles' practice squad.
