= Luke Elkin =

American football player (born 2002)

Profile
- Position: Long snapper

Personal information
- Born: June 27, 2002 (age 24); Neenah, Wisconsin, U.S.
- Listed height: 6 ft 1 in (1.85 m)
- Listed weight: 235 lb (107 kg)

Career information
- High school: Neenah (WI)
- College: Iowa (2021–2024)
- NFL draft: 2025: undrafted

Career history
- Chicago Bears (2025)*; Las Vegas Raiders (2025)*; Chicago Bears (2026)*
- * Offseason or practice squad member only

Awards and highlights
- First-team All-American (2024); Second-team All-Big Ten (2024)
- Stats at Pro Football Reference

Luke Elkin (born June 27, 2002) is an American professional football long snapper. He played college football for the Iowa Hawkeyes.

== Early life ==
Elkin attended Neenah High School in Neenah, Wisconsin. During his junior season, he led his team to the playoffs and a 5–6 record, throwing for 798 yards and rushing for 383 yards. Coming out of high school, Elkin held offers to play as a Division II quarterback, but committed to play college football as a long snapper for the Iowa Hawkeyes, joining the team as a walk-on.

== College career ==
Elkin made his collegiate debut in week 2 of the 2021 season versus rival Iowa State. Heading into the 2024 season, he was named to the Mannelly Award watch list, after being named all-academic Big Ten the previous two seasons. For his performance during the 2024 season Elkin was named a AFCA All-American, as well as being named second-team all-Big Ten. He finished his collegiate career with six tackles in 53 games.

== Professional career ==
Pre-draft measurables
| Height | Weight | Arm length | Hand span | Wingspan | 40-yard dash | 10-yard split | 20-yard split | 20-yard shuttle | Three-cone drill | Vertical jump | Broad jump | Bench press |
|---|---|---|---|---|---|---|---|---|---|---|---|---|
| 6 ft 0 5/8 in (1.84 m) | 233 lb (106 kg) | 31 1/4 in (0.79 m) | 9 7/8 in (0.25 m) | 6 ft 4 3/8 in (1.94 m) | 4.80 s | 1.69 s | 2.73 s | 4.55 s | 7.29 s | 32.0 in (0.81 m) | 9 ft 4 in (2.84 m) | 12 reps |
All values from Pro Day

=== Chicago Bears ===
After not being selected in the 2025 NFL draft, Elkin signed with the Chicago Bears as an undrafted free agent. He was waived on August 26 as part of final roster cuts and re-signed to the practice squad the next day. Elkin was released by the Bears on August 28.

=== Las Vegas Raiders ===
On December 24, 2025, Elkin was signed to the Las Vegas Raiders' practice squad.

=== Chicago Bears (second stint) ===
On January 20, 2026, Elkin signed a reserve/futures contract with the Chicago Bears. He was waived by the Bears on August 9.
