= Tez Johnson =

American football player (born 2002)

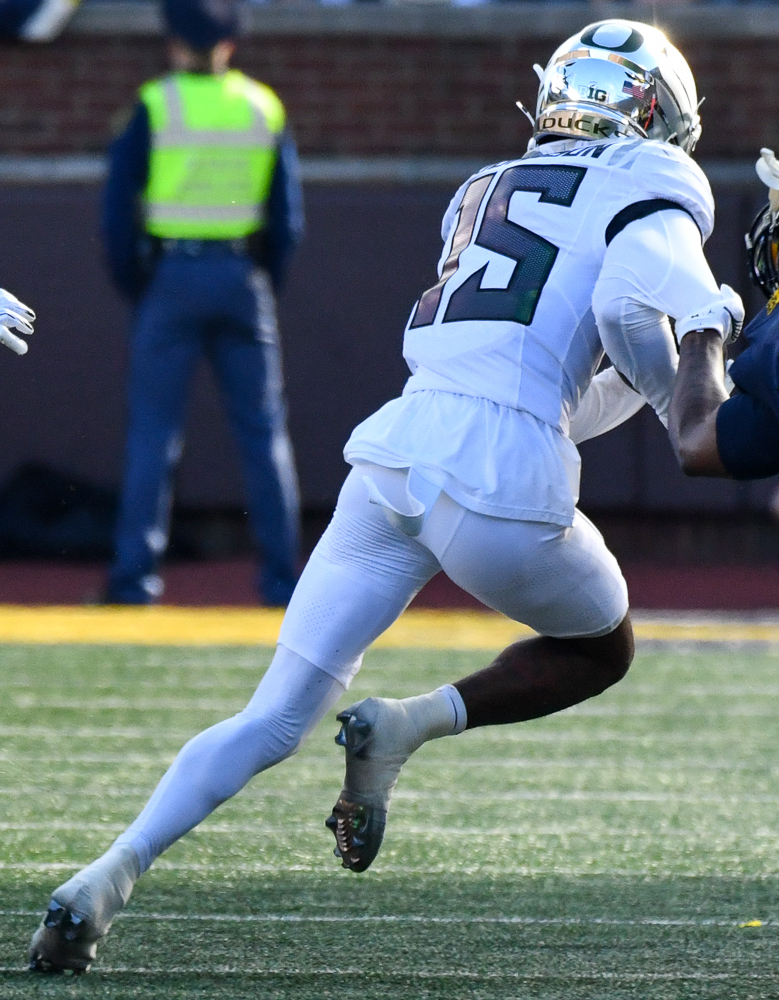
- Johnson with the Oregon Ducks in 2024

No. 15 – Tampa Bay Buccaneers
- Position: Wide receiver
- Roster status: Active

Personal information
- Born: May 18, 2002 (age 24); Birmingham, Alabama, U.S.
- Listed height: 5 ft 10 in (1.78 m)
- Listed weight: 165 lb (75 kg)

Career information
- High school: Pinson Valley (Pinson, Alabama)
- College: Troy (2020–2022); Oregon (2023–2024)
- NFL draft: 2025: 7th round, 235th overall pick

Career history
- Tampa Bay Buccaneers (2025–present)

Awards and highlights
- Second-team All-Big Ten (2024); Third-team All-Sun Belt (2021); Big Ten Football Championship Game MVP (2024)

Career NFL statistics as of Week 9, 2026
- Receptions: 39
- Receiving yards: 576
- Receiving touchdowns: 6
- Stats at Pro Football Reference

Keyonteze "Tez" Johnson (born May 18, 2002) is an American professional wide receiver for the Tampa Bay Buccaneers of the National Football League (NFL). He played college football for the Troy Trojans and Oregon Ducks. Johnson was selected by the Buccaneers in the seventh round of the 2025 NFL draft.

== Early life ==
Johnson was born on May 18, 2002, in Birmingham, Alabama. His father died by suicide when he was an infant and Johnson grew up in government subsidized housing in Pinson, Alabama. At age 15, he was taken in by the family of quarterback Bo Nix, whose father Pat was his high school football coach. He played football at Pinson Valley High School with Nix and helped them win the class 6A state championship.

Johnson was a three-year starter at the school and was a first-team all-state selection as a junior when he caught 106 receptions for 1,457 yards and 10 touchdowns, including a 17-catch, 247-yard, three-touchdown performance in one game which was the eighth-most catches in a game in state history. He caught 62 passes for 1,140 yards and 12 scores as a senior while being invited to the Alabama–Mississippi All-Star Game. Ranked a three-star recruit and the 39th-best player in the state by ESPN, he chose to play college football for the Troy Trojans.

== College career ==
Johnson entered Troy in 2020 and as a true freshman played 11 games totaling 18 receptions for 211 yards. He was the team's leading receiver in 2021 with 67 catches for 735 yards and four touchdowns, being named third-team All-Sun Belt Conference. He remained Troy's top receiver in 2022, being named honorable mention all-conference while totaling 56 receptions for 863 yards and four scores. Johnson entered the NCAA transfer portal following the 2022 season.

Johnson ultimately transferred to the Oregon Ducks, joining his adoptive brother Bo Nix, the team's starting quarterback. He became Oregon's second-leading receiver, behind Troy Franklin, and helped them reach the 2023 Pac-12 Conference title game. In the 2024 season, Johnson played in 12 games, recording 83 receptions for 898 yards and 10 touchdowns. Johnson also won MVP of the Big Ten Championship Game, recording 11 receptions for 181 yards and a touchdown. On January 6, 2025, Johnson declared for the 2025 NFL draft.

=== College statistics ===
Season	Team	Games		Receiving				Rushing				Punt return				Kick return			
Season	Team	GP	GS	Rec	Yds	Avg	TD	Att	Yds	Avg	TD	Ret	Yds	Avg	TD	Ret	Yds	Avg	TD
2020	Troy	11	0	18	211	11.7	0	1	5	5.0	0	9	42	4.7	0	1	12	12.0	0
2021	Troy	12	12	67	735	11.0	4	2	35	17.5	1	8	63	7.9	0	—	—	—	—
2022	Troy	13	8	56	863	15.4	4	5	11	2.2	0	6	69	11.5	0	—	—	—	—
2023	Oregon	14	13	86	1,182	13.7	10	—	—	—	—	20	190	9.5	0	1	0	0.0	0
2024	Oregon	12	12	83	898	10.8	10	1	−1	−1.0	0	13	155	11.9	1	—	—	—	—
Career		62	45	310	3,889	12.5	28	9	50	5.6	1	56	519	9.3	1	2	12	6.0	0

== Professional career ==
Pre-draft measurables
Height	Weight	Arm length	Hand span	Wingspan	40-yard dash	10-yard split	20-yard split	20-yard shuttle	Three-cone drill	Vertical jump	Broad jump
5 ft 9 7/8 in (1.77 m)	154 lb (70 kg)	29 3/8 in (0.75 m)	9 in (0.23 m)	6 ft 1 3/4 in (1.87 m)	4.51 s	1.53 s	2.66 s	4.15 s	6.65 s	37.0 in (0.94 m)	10 ft 11 in (3.33 m)
All values from NFL Combine

Johnson was drafted by the Tampa Bay Buccaneers with the 235th overall pick of the seventh round of the 2025 NFL draft.

=== 2025 ===
In Week 6 against the San Francisco 49ers, Johnson scored his first career touchdown on a 45-yard reception from Baker Mayfield. Johnson appeared in 16 regular-season games. He recorded 28 receptions for 322 yards and scored 5 receiving touchdowns. His 5 touchdown catches marked the second-most by a rookie seventh-round draft choice since the 1970 AFL-NFL merger, trailing only Marques Colston, who recorded 8 in 2006.

== NFL career statistics ==
Legend
**Bold**	Career high

=== Regular season ===
Year	Team	Games		Receiving					Rushing					Fumbles	
Year	Team	GP	GS	Rec	Yds	Avg	Lng	TD	Att	Yds	Avg	Lng	TD	Fum	Lost
2025	TB	16	8	28	322	11.5	45	5	7	22	3.1	6	0	0	0
2026	TB	9	3	11	254	23.1	64	1	3	20	6.7	14	0	0	0
Career		25	11	39	576	14.8	64	6	10	42	4.2	14	0	0	0

== Personal life ==
Johnson is a Christian. Johnson's adopted brother, Bo Nix, is the quarterback for the Denver Broncos.
