= Joe Huber =

American football player (born 2002)

No. 60 – Minnesota Vikings
- Position: Guard
- Roster status: Active

Personal information
- Born: May 2, 2002 (age 24); Dublin, Ohio, U.S.
- Listed height: 6 ft 5 in (1.96 m)
- Listed weight: 310 lb (141 kg)

Career information
- High school: Jerome (Dublin, Ohio)
- College: Cincinnati (2020–2022); Wisconsin (2023–2024)
- NFL draft: 2025: undrafted

Career history
- Minnesota Vikings (2025–present)

Awards and highlights
- Third-team All-Big Ten (2024)

Career NFL statistics as of Week 10, 2026
- Games played: 21
- Games started: 6
- Stats at Pro Football Reference

Joe Huber (born May 2, 2002) is an American professional football guard for the Minnesota Vikings of the National Football League (NFL). He played college football for the Cincinnati Bearcats and Wisconsin Badgers.

== Early life ==
Huber was born on May 2, 2002, and grew up in central Ohio. He attended Dublin Jerome High School where he competed in football and wrestling. He weighed only 170 pounds (77 kg) as a sophomore and played for the junior varsity (JV) team, and as a junior, remained on the JV squad, at 190 pounds (86 kg). He then had a growth spurt and reached 220 pounds (100 kg) while standing at 6 feet 4 inches (1.93 m); he made the varsity football team and was a two-way starter as a lineman. He helped the team compile a 9–3 record while winning the conference championship, and Huber was named an all-state right tackle. Additionally, in wrestling, he competed at the state tournament as a senior. Huber was a no-star recruit and was an unranked prospect, receiving no scholarship offers. He walked-on to play for the Cincinnati Bearcats, one of only two teams to offer him a walk-on opportunity.

== College career ==
Huber redshirted as a freshman at Cincinnati in 2020, being a member of the scout team. He appeared in seven games during the 2021 season and was put on scholarship prior to the 2022 season. He started all 13 games for Cincinnati in 2022 at right tackle, being named honorable mention All-American Athletic Conference (AAC). In 2023, he transferred to the Wisconsin Badgers, following coach Luke Fickell. He started all 13 games for Wisconsin in 2023 at left guard and then moved to right guard in 2024, starting 12 games and being named third-team All-Big Ten Conference. He concluded his collegiate career with 37 starts, which came at three different positions, and accepted an invite to the 2025 East–West Shrine Bowl.

== Professional career ==
Pre-draft measurables
Height	Weight	Arm length	Hand span	Wingspan	40-yard dash	10-yard split	20-yard split	20-yard shuttle	Three-cone drill	Vertical jump	Broad jump
6 ft 5 1/8 in (1.96 m)	310 lb (141 kg)	32 1/4 in (0.82 m)	9 3/4 in (0.25 m)	6 ft 7 1/2 in (2.02 m)	5.20 s	1.80 s	3.00 s	4.78 s	7.69 s	28.0 in (0.71 m)	8 ft 10 in (2.69 m)
All values from NFL Combine

Huber signed with the Minnesota Vikings as an undrafted free agent on April 26, 2025. He made the initial 53-man roster on August 26, 2025. He was one of the seven undrafted free agents that made the Vikings roster. Huber made his first career NFL start at left guard against the Cleveland Browns in London on October 5, 2025, after injuries to three offensive line starters.
