= Jermari Harris =

American football player (born 2000)

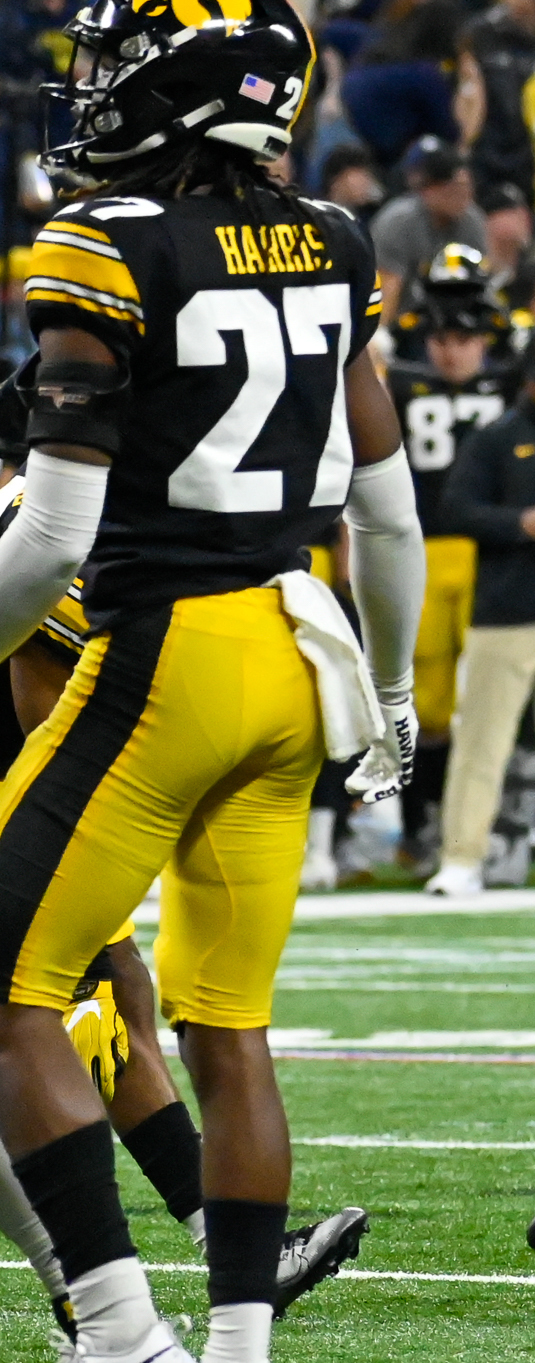

Profile
- Position: Cornerback

Personal information
- Born: September 19, 2000 (age 26); Chicago, Illinois, U.S.
- Listed height: 6 ft 0 in (1.83 m)
- Listed weight: 191 lb (87 kg)

Career information
- High school: Montini Catholic (Lombard, Illinois)
- College: Iowa (2019–2024)
- NFL draft: 2025: undrafted

Career history
- Tennessee Titans (2025)*
- * Offseason or practice squad member only

Awards and highlights
- Third-team All-Big Ten (2024)
- Stats at Pro Football Reference

Jermari Harris (born September 19, 2000) is an American professional football cornerback. He played college football for the Iowa Hawkeyes.

== Early life ==
Harris attended Montini Catholic High School in Lombard, Illinois, where he recorded 72 tackles, eight interceptions, five pass breakups, and two forced fumbles as a senior. He was rated as a three-star recruit and committed to play college football for the Iowa Hawkeyes over schools such as Ball State, Northern Illinois, and South Dakota State.

== College career ==
In his first two seasons with the Hawkeyes in 2019 and 2020, Harris appeared in seven games where he notched two tackles. In 2021, he played in 13 games with six starts for the Hawkeyes, where he totaled 34 tackles with one and a half being for a loss, eight pass deflections, and four interceptions. Harris missed the entire 2022 season due to injury. In 2023, he notched 42 tackles, eight pass deflections, and an interception. In week 3 of the 2024 season, Harris notched two pass deflections, and an interception which he returned 28 yards for a touchdown, as he helped Iowa beat Troy.

== Professional career ==
Pre-draft measurables
Height	Weight	Arm length	Hand span	Vertical jump	Broad jump
6 ft 0 1/2 in (1.84 m)	191 lb (87 kg)	31 3/8 in (0.80 m)	9 3/4 in (0.25 m)	37.0 in (0.94 m)	10 ft 0 in (3.05 m)
All values from NFL Combine

On May 8, 2025, Harris signed with the Tennessee Titans as an undrafted free agent after going unselected in the 2025 NFL draft. He was waived on August 25.
