= Koi Perich =

American football player (born 2005)

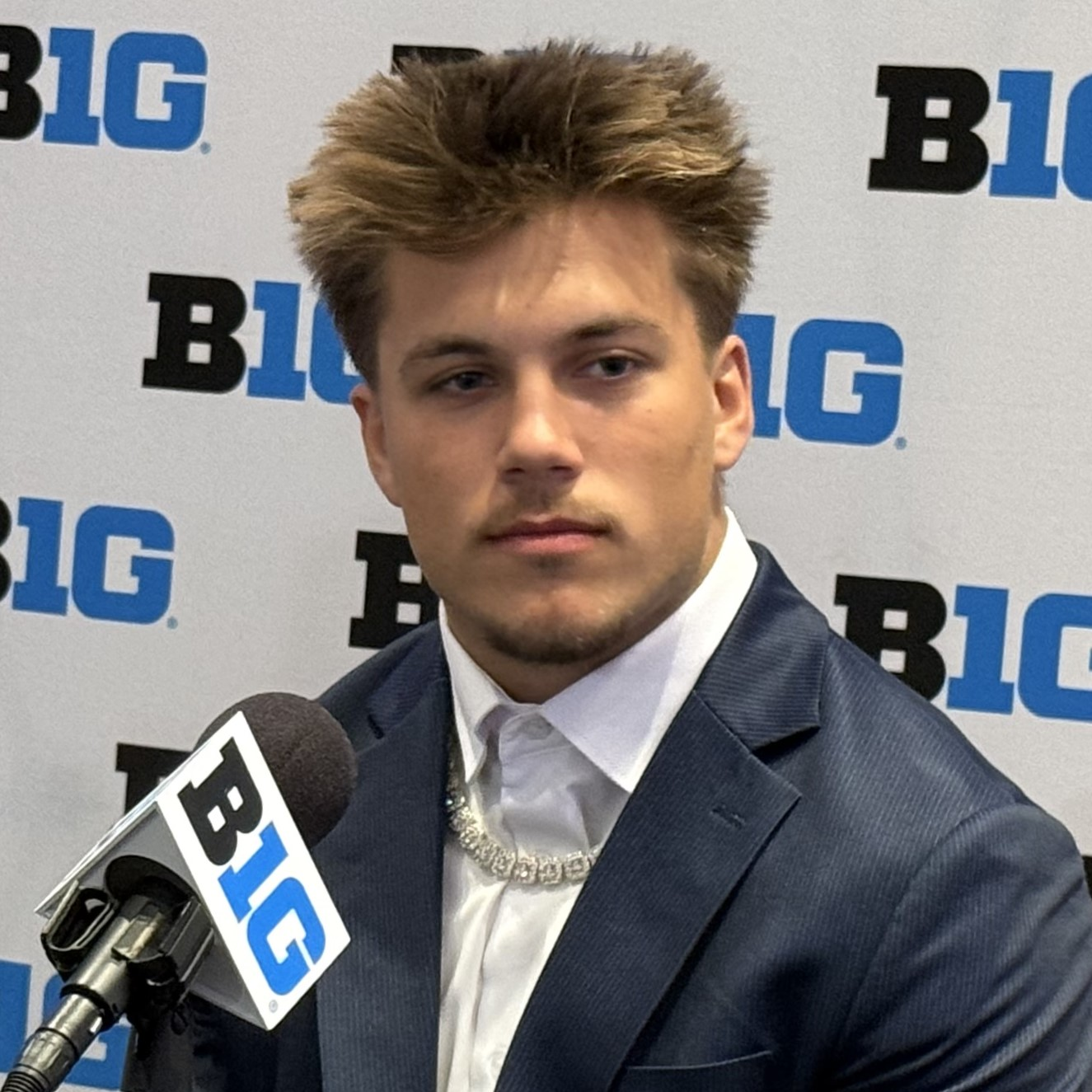
- Perich at 2025 Big Ten Media Days

No. 3 – Oregon Ducks
- Position: Safety
- Class: Junior

Personal information
- Born: September 26, 2005 (age 21)
- Listed height: 6 ft 1 in (1.85 m)
- Listed weight: 200 lb (91 kg)

Career information
- High school: Esko (Esko, Minnesota)
- College: Minnesota (2024–2025); Oregon (2026–present)

Awards and highlights
- Second-team All-American (2024); First-team All-Big Ten (2024); Second-team All-Big Ten (2025)
- Stats at ESPN

Koi Perich (born September 26, 2005) is an American college football safety for the Oregon Ducks. He previously played for the Minnesota Golden Gophers.

== Early life ==
Perich attended Esko High School in Esko, Minnesota. As a junior, he rushed for over 800 yards, notched 75 tackles, two sacks, three interceptions, four forced fumbles, and 25 touchdowns. In the first game of his senior season, Perich intercepted two passes which he returned both for touchdowns. As a senior, he amassed 27 total touchdowns: 16 rushing, five defensive, four return, one passing, and one receiving. Perich also notched 76 tackles, three interceptions, and four fumble recoveries on defense, earning all-state recognition. He accepted an invite to play in the All-American Bowl, where he intercepted a pass on the goal line and blocked a punt en route to earning game MVP honors.

=== Recruiting ===
Perich received offers from schools such as USC, Michigan, Wisconsin, Minnesota, Iowa and Washington, as well as late offers from Florida State and Ohio State. He committed to play college football for the Minnesota Golden Gophers.

College recruiting (2024)
Name	Hometown	School	Height	Weight	Commit date
Koi Perich; Safety	Esko, Minnesota	Esko High School	6 ft 0 in (1.83 m)	190 lb (86 kg)	Apr 19, 2023
Koi Perich; Safety	Recruit ratings: Rivals: 247Sports: ESPN: (82)				

== College career ==
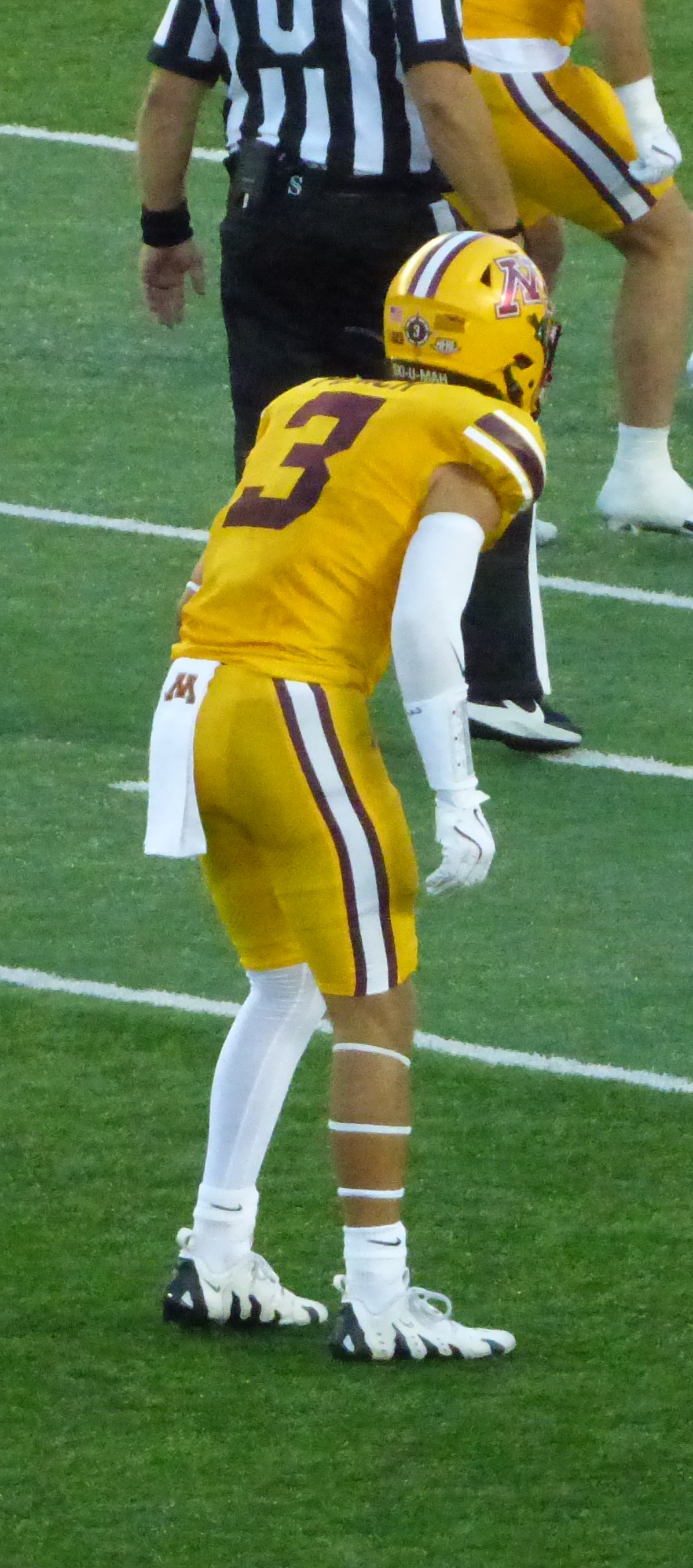
Perich in 2025

As a freshman, Perich recorded 24 solo tackles, one pass defended, one forced fumble, and five interceptions. He was named first-team All-Big Ten Conference and second-team All-American following the conclusion of the regular season.

Koi Perich entered his sophomore season in 2025 with increased responsibilities across defense, special teams, and occasional offensive snaps. Mistakes early in the season led to a reduction of offensive snaps, but Perich scored a game winning touchdown on his first career defensive score to win the schools 2025 homecoming game against Purdue.

On January 1, 2026, Perich announced that he would enter the transfer portal.

On January 12, 2026, Perich announced that he would be transferring to the University of Oregon.
