= Jonathan Kim (American football) =

American football player (born 2001)

Profile
- Position: Kicker

Personal information
- Born: February 21, 2001 (age 25)
- Listed height: 6 ft 0 in (1.83 m)
- Listed weight: 232 lb (105 kg)

Career information
- High school: Massaponax (Fredericksburg, Virginia)
- College: North Carolina (2019–2023); Michigan State (2023–2024)
- NFL draft: 2025: undrafted

Career history
- Chicago Bears (2025)*; Saskatchewan Roughriders (2026)*
- * Offseason or practice squad member only

Awards and highlights
- Second-team All-Big Ten (2024)

Jonathan Kim (born February 21, 2001) is an American professional football kicker. He played college football for the North Carolina Tar Heels and Michigan State Spartans.

== Early life ==
Kim is from Fredericksburg, Virginia. He attended Massaponax High School in Fredericksburg where he played football. A kicker and punter, he played four years for Massaponax and converted 12 of 19 field goal attempts and 150 of 165 extra points. He opted to play college football for the North Carolina Tar Heels as a walk-on.

== College career ==
As a true freshman at North Carolina in 2019, Kim was used as a kickoff specialist and also attempted one field goal, a miss. He remained kickoff specialist in 2020 and was the national leader in touchbacks with 76. He was the Atlantic Coast Conference (ACC) leader in touchbacks with 65 in the 2021 season. After playing four games in 2022, he redshirted and entered the NCAA transfer portal. Across his tenure at North Carolina, Kim averaged 63.8 yards per kickoff in 2019, 64.5 yards in 2020, 62.2 yards in 2021, and 62.4 yards in 2022.

Kim transferred to the Michigan State Spartans for the 2023 season. He became the Spartans' kicker and kickoff specialist, converting 13 of 18 field goal attempts and all 17 of his extra point attempts. Against Iowa, he made a 58-yard field goal attempt, the longest successful kick at Kinnick Stadium. He returned for a final year in 2024 and made 19 of 21 field goals and 22 of 24 extra points. He set a Michigan State record with six field goals in a game in 2024 and concluded his collegiate career having made 32 of 40 field goals and 42 of 44 extra points along with an average of 63.2 yards per kickoff, setting the Michigan State school record with 82.1% of his field goals being successful.

== Professional career ==
=== Chicago Bears ===
After going unselected in the 2025 NFL draft, Kim signed with the Chicago Bears as an undrafted free agent. On August 12, 2025, the Bears waived Kim.

=== Saskatchewan Roughriders ===
On February 5, 2026, Kim signed with the Saskatchewan Roughriders of the Canadian Football League (CFL). He was released on May 30 as part of final roster cuts.
