= A. J. Harris (cornerback) =

American football player (born 2005)

No. 4 – Indiana Hoosiers
- Position: Cornerback
- Class: Senior

Personal information
- Born: January 11, 2005 (age 21); California, U.S.
- Listed height: 6 ft 1 in (1.85 m)
- Listed weight: 189 lb (86 kg)

Career information
- High school: Central (Phenix City, Alabama)
- College: Georgia (2023); Penn State (2024–2025); Indiana (2026–present)

Awards and highlights
- Third-team All-Big Ten (2024)
- Stats at ESPN

Aaron-Joshua Titus Harris (born January 11, 2005) is an American college football cornerback for the Indiana Hoosiers. He previously played for the Georgia Bulldogs and Penn State Nittany Lions

== Early life ==
Harris was born in California and moved to Germany when he was an infant due to his fathers career in the US Army. Harris moved back to the United States when he was nine, living in Columbus, Georgia and Phenix City, Alabama. He attended Central High School in Phenix City, Alabama. As a senior, he had 52 tackles three interceptions and one sack. A five-star recruit, Harris was selected to play in the 2023 All-American Bowl. He committed to the University of Georgia to play college football.

== College career ==
Harris played at Georgia for one year in 2023, appearing in seven games and recording eight tackles. After the season he entered the transfer portal and transferred to Penn State. He entered his first year at Penn State in 2024 as a starter. Against the Illinois Fighting Illini, he recorded his first career interception.
