= Kobe King =

American football player (born 2003)

Profile
- Position: Linebacker

Personal information
- Born: January 28, 2003 (age 23); Detroit, Michigan, U.S.
- Listed height: 6 ft 1 in (1.85 m)
- Listed weight: 250 lb (113 kg)

Career information
- High school: Cass Tech (Detroit)
- College: Penn State (2021–2024)
- NFL draft: 2025: 6th round, 201st overall pick

Career history
- Minnesota Vikings (2025); New York Jets (2025)

Awards and highlights
- Second-team All-Big Ten (2024)

Career NFL statistics as of 2025
- Total tackles: 5
- Stats at Pro Football Reference

Kobe Laron King (born January 28, 2003) is an American professional football linebacker. He played college football for the Penn State Nittany Lions and was selected by the Minnesota Vikings in the sixth round of the 2025 NFL draft.

== Early life ==
King attended Cass Technical High School in Detroit, Michigan. He was rated as a three-star recruit and committed to play college football for the Penn State Nittany Lions over schools such as Michigan and Iowa.

== College career ==
As a freshman in 2021 King tallied three tackles for the Nittany Lions. In 2022, he recorded 41 tackles with four being for a loss, three pass deflections, a fumble recovery, and a touchdown. In 2023, King made 11 starts for Penn State, where he notched 59 tackles with six being for a loss, a sack, and a fumble recovery. Heading into the 2024 season, he was named a team captain. In 2024, King started all 16 games for the Nittany Lions, where he totaled 97 tackles with eight and a half for a loss, and three sacks, earning second-team all-Big Ten Conference honors. After the season, he declared for the 2025 NFL draft.

== Professional career ==
Pre-draft measurables
Height	Weight	Arm length	Hand span	Wingspan	40-yard dash	10-yard split	20-yard split	20-yard shuttle	Three-cone drill	Broad jump	Bench press
6 ft 0 3/4 in (1.85 m)	236 lb (107 kg)	31 1/4 in (0.79 m)	9 1/2 in (0.24 m)	6 ft 6 5/8 in (2.00 m)	4.63 s	1.57 s	2.70 s	4.26 s	7.21 s	9 ft 10 in (3.00 m)	26 reps
All values from NFL Combine/Pro Day

=== Minnesota Vikings ===
King was selected by the Minnesota Vikings with the 201st overall pick of the sixth round in the 2025 NFL draft. King was waived on October 23, 2025 after playing 77 snaps on special teams and only three snaps on defense in his five games.

=== New York Jets ===
On October 24, 2025, King was claimed off waivers by the New York Jets.

On June 1, 2026, King was waived by the Jets with an injury designation and reverted to injured reserve the next day. On August 26, King was waived by the Jets with an injury settlement.

== Personal life ==
King has a twin brother, Kalen, who is a cornerback for the Carolina Panthers.
