= Marcus Harper II =

American football player (born 2002)

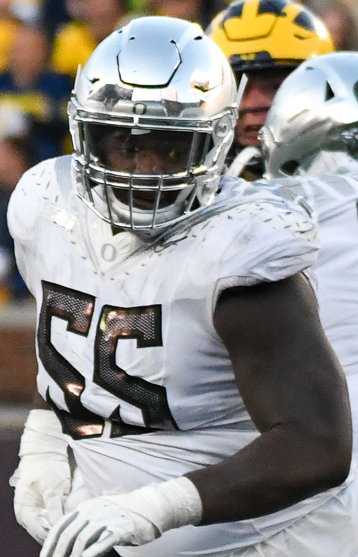
- Harper in 2024

No. 55 – Oregon Ducks
- Position: Offensive lineman
- Class: Senior

Personal information
- Born: June 27, 2002 (age 24); Chicago Heights, Illinois, U.S.
- Listed height: 6 ft 3 in (1.91 m)
- Listed weight: 325 lb (147 kg)

Career information
- High school: Homewood-Flossmoor (Flossmoor, Illinois)
- College: Oregon (2020–present)

Awards and highlights
- Third-team All-Big Ten (2024)
- Stats at ESPN

Marcus Harper II (born June 27, 2002) is an American college football offensive lineman for the Oregon Ducks.

== Biography ==
Born and raised in Chicago Heights, Illinois. Harper II attended Homewood-Flossmoor High School where he first began to play tackle football. Harper II received offers from universities including Nebraska, Duke, Indiana, Illinois, Louisville, Michigan State, Bowling Green, Temple, Boston College and Purdue. In June 2019, Harper II announced his commitment to Oregon.

After speculation of leaving for the 2024 NFL Draft, Harper announced his return to Oregon football for the 2024 season in January 2024.
