= Luke Newman =

American football player (born 2002)

No. 65 – Chicago Bears
- Position: Guard
- Roster status: Active

Personal information
- Born: March 3, 2002 (age 24); Bloomfield Hills, Michigan, U.S.
- Listed height: 6 ft 3 in (1.91 m)
- Listed weight: 308 lb (140 kg)

Career information
- High school: Brother Rice (Bloomfield Township, Oakland County, Michigan)
- College: Holy Cross (2020–2023); Michigan State (2024)
- NFL draft: 2025: 6th round, 195th overall pick

Career history
- Chicago Bears (2025–present)

Awards and highlights
- First-team FCS All-American (2023); 3× First-team All-Patriot (2021, 2022, 2023)

Career NFL statistics as of 2025
- Games played: 9
- Stats at Pro Football Reference

Luke Newman (born March 3, 2002) is an American professional football guard for the Chicago Bears of the National Football League (NFL). He played college football for the Holy Cross Crusaders and Michigan State Spartans. Newman was selected by the Bears in the sixth round of the 2025 NFL draft.

== Early life ==
He attended Brother Rice High School located in Bloomfield Township, Oakland County, Michigan. While attending Brother Rice Newman played basketball and football. Coming out of high school, Newman committed to play college football for the Holy Cross Crusaders.

== College career ==
=== Holy Cross ===
During his time at Holy Cross, Newman played in 37 games, with 34 starts. He was also a two-time FCS all-American in 2022 and 2023. After the 2023 season, Newman entered his name into the NCAA transfer portal.

=== Michigan State ===
Newman transferred to play for the Michigan State Spartans. In 2024, he started all 12 games at left guard. After the season, Newman declared for the 2025 NFL draft, while also accepting an invite to participate in the 2025 East–West Shrine Bowl.

== Professional career ==
Pre-draft measurables
Height	Weight	Arm length	Hand span	Wingspan	40-yard dash	10-yard split	20-yard split	20-yard shuttle	Three-cone drill	Vertical jump	Broad jump	Bench press
6 ft 3 1/2 in (1.92 m)	308 lb (140 kg)	31 in (0.79 m)	9 1/4 in (0.23 m)	6 ft 4 1/4 in (1.94 m)	5.08 s	1.76 s	2.93 s	4.58 s	7.70 s	35.0 in (0.89 m)	9 ft 2 in (2.79 m)	29 reps
All values from Pro Day

Newman was selected by the Chicago Bears with 195th overall pick in the sixth round of the 2025 NFL draft. He was a backup guard during his rookie season. In Week 12 against the Pittsburgh Steelers, Newman took over at right guard during the first half after starter Jonah Jackson exited with an injury; he also served as a fullback on select plays. Newman was placed on injured reserve due to a foot injury on November 27. He was activated on December 27, ahead of the team's Week 17 matchup against the San Francisco 49ers.
