= Tory Taylor =

Australian gridiron football player (born 1997)

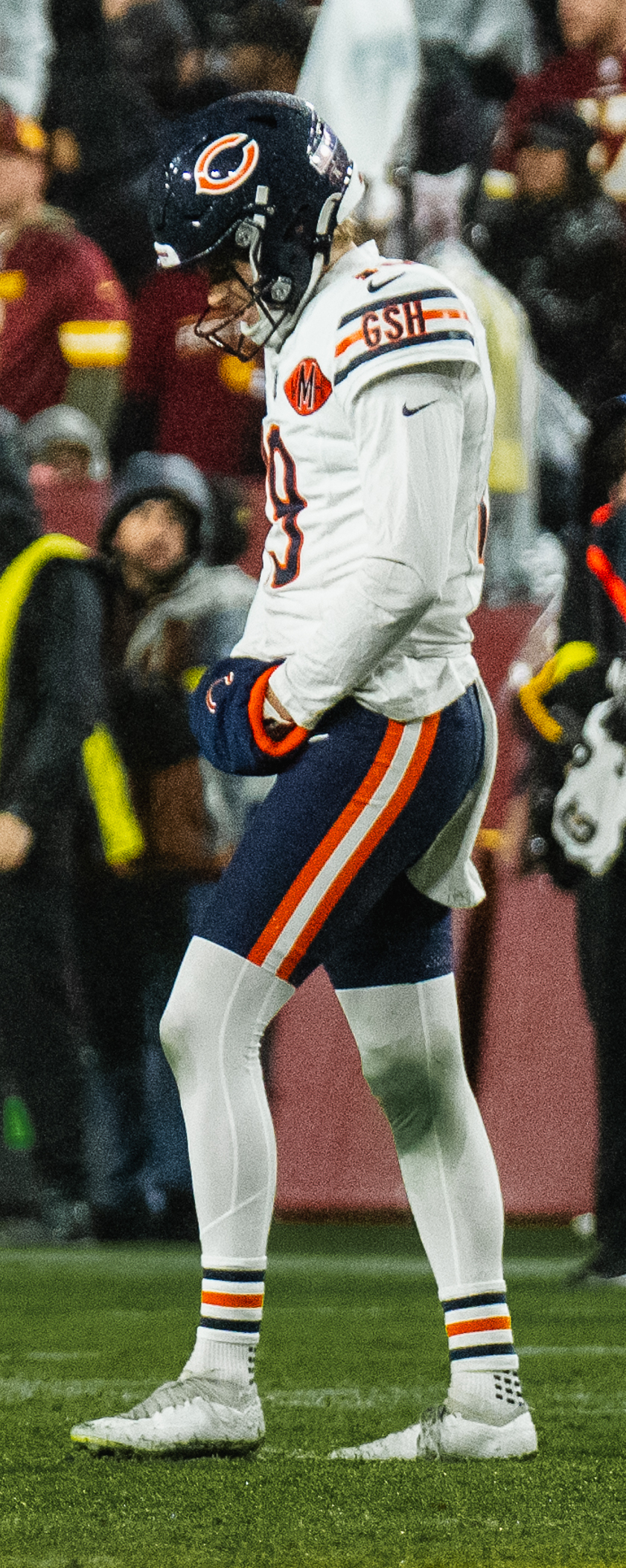
- Taylor with the Chicago Bears in 2025

No. 19 – Chicago Bears
- Position: Punter
- Roster status: Active

Personal information
- Born: 7 October 1997 (age 29); Melbourne, Victoria, Australia
- Listed height: 6 ft 4 in (1.93 m)
- Listed weight: 225 lb (102 kg)

Career information
- High school: Haileybury (Melbourne)
- College: Iowa (2020–2023)
- NFL draft: 2024: 4th round, 122nd overall pick
- CFL draft: 2024G: 2nd round, 15th overall pick

Career history
- Chicago Bears (2024–present)

Awards and highlights
- Ray Guy Award (2023); Unanimous All-American (2023); 2× Big Ten Punter of the Year (2020, 2023); 2× First-team All-Big Ten (2020, 2023); Third-team All-Big Ten (2022); First-team AP All-Time All-American (2025); NCAA FBS records: Most punting yards in a season: 4,479 (2023); Highest career average punting yards: 46.3 (Note: Minimum 250 punts.)

Career NFL statistics as of Week 8, 2026
- Punts: 164
- Punting yards: 7,873
- Punting average: 48
- Longest punt: 69
- Inside 20: 62
- Touchbacks: 13
- Stats at Pro Football Reference

Tory Taylor (born 7 October 1997) is an Australian professional American football punter for the Chicago Bears of the National Football League (NFL). He played college American football for the Iowa Hawkeyes, winning the 2023 Ray Guy Award and being named a unanimous All-American prior to being selected by the Bears in the fourth round of the 2024 NFL draft.

== Early life ==
Taylor was born in Melbourne, Australia and attended high school at Haileybury. Although he played Australian rules football growing up and was unfamiliar with its American counterpart, he became interested in the sport and attended clinics at Prokick Australia to try it out. Prokick's founders Nathan Chapman and John Smith recommended Taylor to the University of Iowa's special teams coordinator LeVar Woods, who recruited him to play college football.

== College career ==
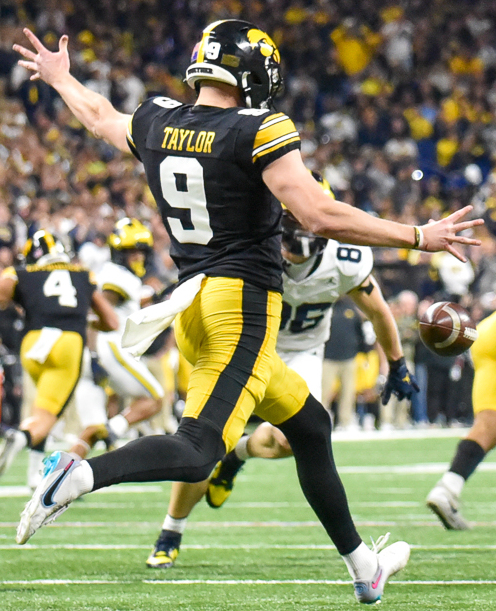
Taylor punting in the 2023 Big Ten Football Championship Game

In Taylor's first college season in 2020, he punted 40 times for 1,765 yards, with 18 punts being down within their opponents' 20 yard line. For his performance on the year, Taylor was named the Big Ten Conference's Punter of the Year, along with being named first team All-Big Ten. In the 2021 season, Taylor punted 80 times for 3,688 yards, along with 38 punts being downed within their opponents' 20 yard line.

In week one of the 2022 season, Taylor punted ten times for 479 yards with seven punts downed inside the 20, as he helped the Hawkeyes beat South Dakota State; he was named the Big Ten Special Teams Player of the Week. In the following week, Taylor would punt six times for 304 yards with two punts being downed within the 20 yard line, but Iowa would lose to rival Iowa State. Taylor finished the 2022 season with 82 punts for 3,725 yards, along with 38 punts inside the 20 yard line. For his performance on the season, Taylor was named first team All-Big Ten by the media, and third team All-Big Ten by the coaches. Taylor was also named first team All-American.

Instead of declaring for the 2023 NFL draft, Taylor decided to return for the season. In week six of the 2023 season, Taylor punted six times for 284 yards, with two of his punts landing within their opponents' 20 yard line, as he helped the Hawkeyes win their homecoming game beating Purdue 20–14. For his performance, Taylor would be named the Big Ten Special Teams Player of the Week. In the following week, Taylor would punt ten times for 506 yards, while six of his punts would be downed within the 20 yard line, as he helped Iowa beat Wisconsin. For his performance, Taylor would be named the Big Ten Special Teams Player of the Week, in back to back weeks. In the 2024 Citrus Bowl, Taylor broke the NCAA record for most punting yards in a season, with 4,479 yards. The feat bested the previous of record of 4,138, set 85 years prior by John Fingel.

Despite his position, Taylor was widely credited with helping Iowa remain competitive amid anemic performances by the offense. His punts regularly pinned the receiving team deep on their own side of the field, which allowed Iowa's top-ranking defense to prevent their opponent from scoring and keep games close. In 2023, the offense averaged 16.6 points per game (fourth worst in the country) but went 10–3 with the majority of the wins coming in what USA Today writer Craig Meyer described as "low-scoring games in which the fight for field position was paramount." His total punting yardage that year also exceeded the 3,296 recorded by Iowa's offense as well as 33 other schools.

For his contributions in 2023, he received the Ray Guy Award for the best punter in the country, was named a unanimous first-team All-American, and became the only multi-time winner of the Big Ten Punter of the Year. A coach also gave Taylor a first-place vote for that season's Chicago Tribune Silver Football, given to the best player in the Big Ten as voted upon by coaches.

Taylor ended his career with the FBS record for most average yards per punt at 46.3. He also led the subdivision in punts within the 20-yard line in his final three years.

=== Statistics ===
Season	Punting									
Season	GP	Punts	Avg	Lng	Yds	TB	TB%	In20	In20%	Net
2020	8	40	44.1	61	1,765	1	2.50	18	29.51	42.8
2021	14	80	46.1	69	3,688	13	16.25	39	48.75	42.1
2022	13	82	45.4	70	3,725	11	13.41	38	46.34	41.6
2023	14	93	48.2	67	4,479	7	7.52	32	34.41	43.8
Career	49	295	46.3	70	13,657	32	10.76	127	43.40	42.6

== Professional career ==
Pre-draft measurables
Height	Weight	Arm length	Hand span	Wingspan
6 ft 3 7/8 in (1.93 m)	223 lb (101 kg)	32 1/8 in (0.82 m)	9 in (0.23 m)	6 ft 7 in (2.01 m)
All values from NFL Combine

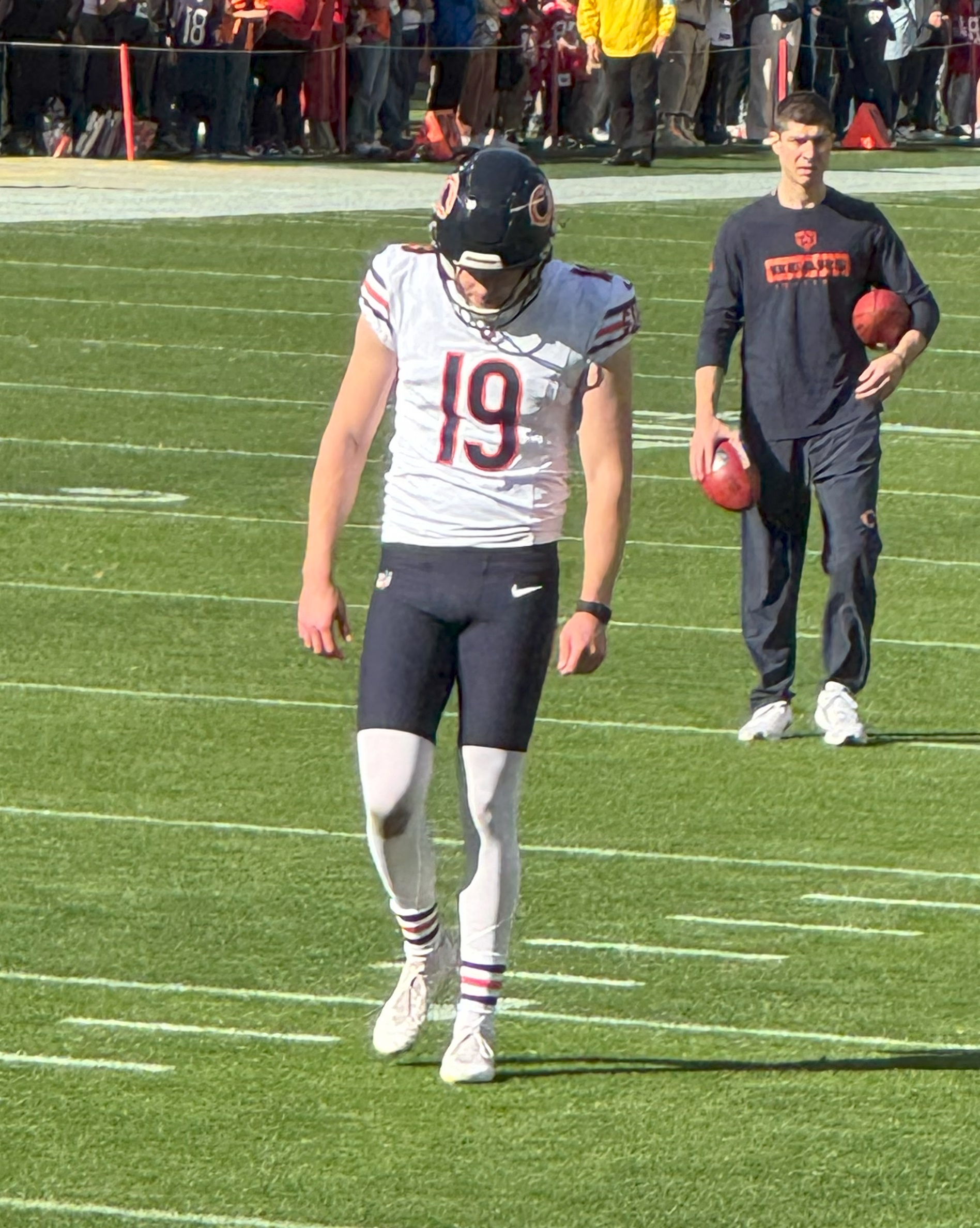
Taylor in 2024

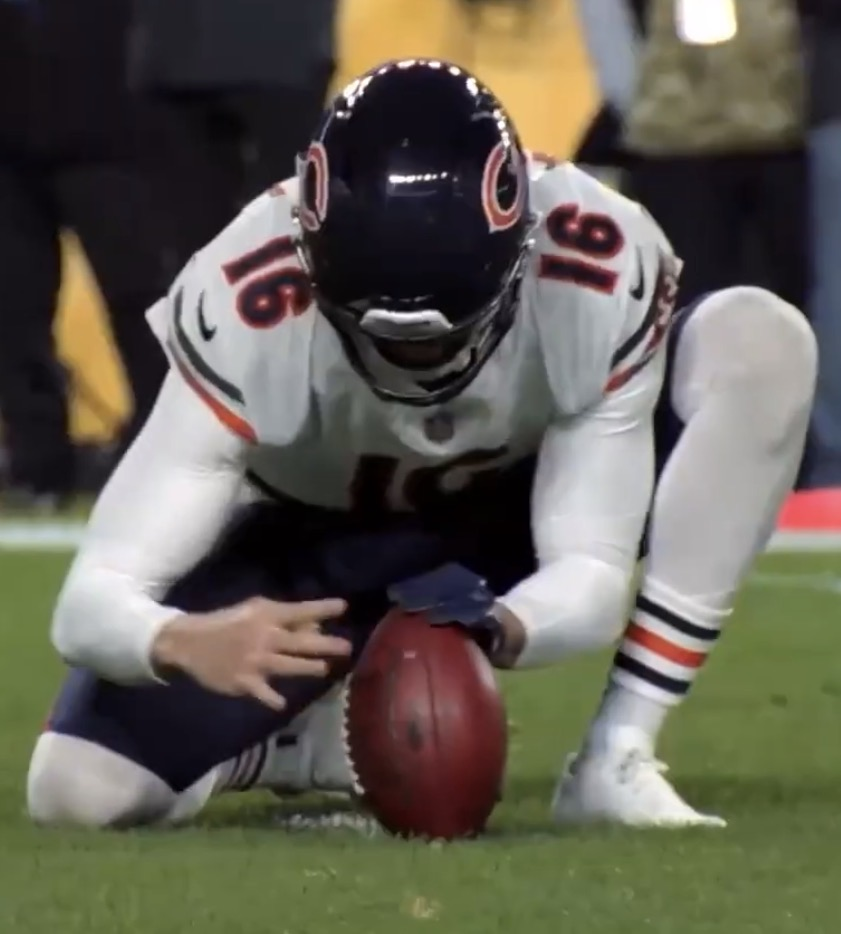
Taylor in 2025

Taylor was selected by the Chicago Bears in the fourth round (122nd overall) of the 2024 NFL draft, making him the highest punter selected since 2019 and the highest by the team since Todd Sauerbrun was picked in the second round in 1995. He was also selected by the BC Lions 15th overall in the 2024 CFL global draft. He signed his four-year rookie contract with the Bears on 11 May 2024.

In Week 4 of the 2024 season against the Los Angeles Rams, Taylor pinned three of his five punts inside the 10-yard line. His role pinned the Rams and helped the Bears' "takeaway-crazed" defense seal the 24–18 win: Taylor's final punt with 1:13 remaining placed the Los Angeles offense at their own 8, meaning they would have needed to drive 92 yards to score the tying touchdown, but it ended with an interception. Taylor earned NFC Special Teams Player of the Week, the first Bears punter to receive the award since Brad Maynard in 2007. He finished his rookie year with the second most punts in the league at 82 while ranking 15th in yards per punt at 47.7, 20th in net yards (41.6), sixth in fair catches forced (23), and fifth in punts that forced opponents to start within their own 20-yard line (34). His longest punt was 68 yards.

An improved Bears offense in 2025 meant Taylor did not see as much action as his rookie year, recording 60 punts for 2,870 yards with 21 within the opposing 20-yard line. His longest kick was in Week 4 against the Las Vegas Raiders as it travelled 62 yards and was downed at the one-yard line, resulting in a 69-yard punt.

During the 2026 season, Taylor developed a reputation for his "banana ball" punts. Derived from Australian rules football, the punt entails dropping and kicking the ball at different angles so it creates a banana-shaped arc while airborne; the ball's sideways rotation in the air while following such a trajectory makes it difficult for the punt returner to track and catch. Taylor's banana ball caused Carolina Panthers returner Jimmy Horn Jr. to muff his punt in Week 1, subsequently leading to Horn's release. Atlanta Falcons return specialist Zachariah Branch also fumbled on after Taylor attempted a banana punt in Week 6. Both muffs were recovered by the Bears and led to touchdowns by the offense. In the Bears' Week 8 win over the Seattle Seahawks, Taylor had a punt blocked by Irvin Charles but still went for 45 yards.

Being an Australian, he was moved to the exempt/international player list during the offseasons in 2024, 2025, and 2026. This allowed the Bears to sign an additional player to the 90-man roster for training camp, while Taylor continued to practice with the team as usual without counting for the limit. The Bears assigned Taylor to the list to make room for running back Demetric Felton in 2024, cornerback Jeremiah Walker in 2025, and safety Anthony Johnson Jr. in 2026. The designation was removed once the final 53-player roster was set.

== NFL career statistics ==
Legend
**Bold**	Career high

=== Regular season ===
Year	Team	GP	Punting							
Year	Team	GP	Punts	Yds	Lng	Avg	Net Avg	Blk	Ins20	RetY
2024	CHI	**17**	**82**	**3,911**	68	47.7	**41.5**	0	**34**	**424**
2025	CHI	**17**	60	2,870	**69**	**47.8**	40.4	0	21	306
2026	CHI	5	12	614	63	51.2	44.3	0	4	63
Career		39	154	7,395	69	48.0	41.1	0	59	793

=== Postseason ===
Year	Team	GP	Punting							
Year	Team	GP	Punts	Yds	Lng	Avg	Net Avg	Blk	Ins20	RetY
2025	CHI	2	3	141	51	47.0	47.0	0	1	0
Career		2	3	141	51	47.0	47.0	0	1	0

== Personal life ==
Taylor is first cousins with St Kilda's Mitchito Owens (AFL). He is a supporter of the Australian Football League's Richmond Football Club and A-League soccer club Melbourne City FC.
