= 2023 Iowa Hawkeyes football team =

American college football season

2023 Iowa Hawkeyes football

Big Ten West Division champion

Big Ten Championship Game, L 0–26 vs. Michigan

Citrus Bowl, L 0–35 vs. Tennessee
- Conference: Big Ten Conference
- West Division

Ranking
- Coaches: No. 22
- AP: No. 24
- Record: 6–4, 4 wins vacated (6–2 Big Ten, 1 win vacated)
- Head coach: Kirk Ferentz (25th season)
- Offensive coordinator: Brian Ferentz (7th season)
- Offensive scheme: Multiple
- Defensive coordinator: Phil Parker (12th season)
- Base defense: 4–2–5
- Captains: Jay Higgins; Cade McNamara; Luke Lachey; Cooper DeJean
- Home stadium: Kinnick Stadium

2023 Big Ten Conference football standings
	Conf.			Overall
Team	W		L	W		L
East Division
No. 1 Michigan xy$#^	9	–	0	15	–	0
No. 10 Ohio State	8	–	1	11	–	2
No. 13 Penn State	7	–	2	10	–	3
Maryland	4	–	5	8	–	5
Rutgers	3	–	6	7	–	6
Indiana	1	–	8	3	–	9
Michigan State†	0	–	7	0	–	8
West Division
No. 24 Iowa xy	7	–	2	10	–	4
Northwestern	5	–	4	8	–	5
Wisconsin	5	–	4	7	–	6
Minnesota	3	–	6	6	–	7
Illinois	3	–	6	5	–	7
Nebraska	3	–	6	5	–	7
Purdue	3	–	6	4	–	8
Championship: Michigan 26, Iowa 0
# – College Football Playoff champion; ^ – College Football Playoff participant; $ – Conference champion; x – Division champion/co-champions; y – Championship game participant; † — NCAA vacated all wins for Michigan State (4–8, 2–7); Rankings from AP Poll

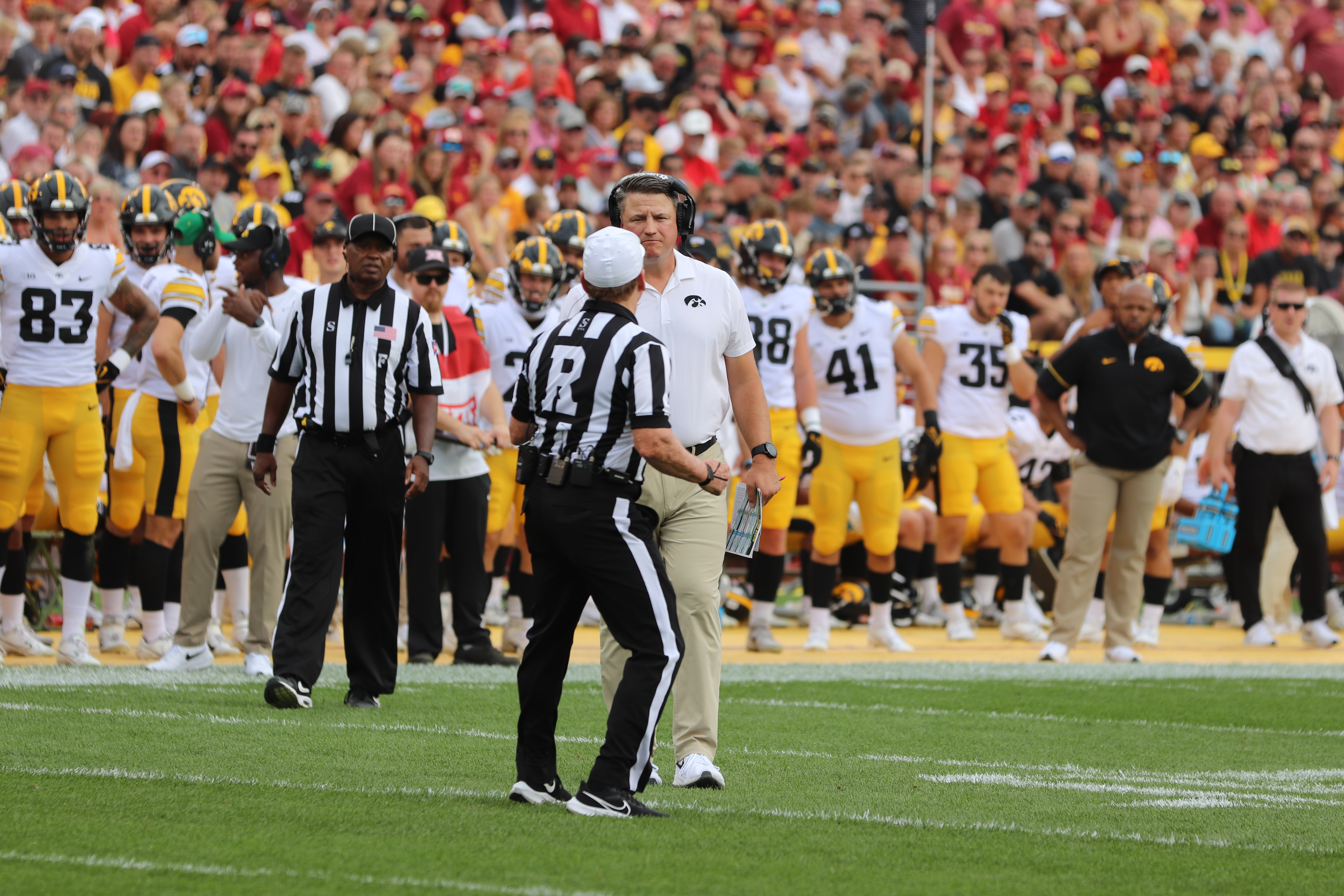
Brian Ferentz, the University of Iowa's offensive coordinator in 2023, wearing a headset and white team-branded shirt, speaks to a referee on the field during a game.

The 2023 Iowa Hawkeyes football team represented the University of Iowa as members of the West Division of the Big Ten Conference during the 2023 NCAA Division I FBS football season. The Hawkeyes were led by Kirk Ferentz in his 25th year as head coach. The Hawkeyes played their home games at Kinnick Stadium in Iowa City, Iowa, and sold out all seven home contests for the second consecutive season.

With a victory over Illinois on Senior Day, Iowa secured the Big Ten West title for the third time. A win over rival Nebraska in the regular season finale completed a 10-win regular season. They competed in the Big Ten Championship Game against the East Division champion No. 2 Michigan, where they were shutout by the eventual national champions 26–0. The Hawkeyes ended the 2023 season with a 35–0 shutout loss to No. 21 Tennessee in the Citrus Bowl.

Senior punter Tory Taylor was named First-team All-Big Ten for the third time, Eddleman–Fields Punter of the Year for the second time, a Unanimous First-team All-American, and the 2023 Ray Guy Award winner as the nation's most outstanding punter. Despite missing the final four games due to a season-ending injury, junior cornerback Cooper DeJean was named First-team All-Big Ten for the second time, Tatum–Woodson Defensive Back of the Year, Rodgers–Dwight Return Specialist of the Year, and a Unanimous First-team All-American. Defensive coordinator Phil Parker won the Broyles Award as the nation's top assistant coach in college football.

The team became infamous over the course of the season for their great defense being paired with a historically terrible offense, causing some to call them the "Best Worst Team Ever". The four lowest over-unders in college football history were set in games involving the 2023 Hawkeyes, the lowest being 24.5 against Nebraska. In each of those four games the final combined score was below the line. On October 30, it was announced that offensive coordinator Brian Ferentz would not be retained in 2024, but would be allowed to finish the rest of the 2023 season. At the time of the announcement, the Hawkeyes' offense was averaging 19.5 points per game, ranking 120th out of 133 in the FBS.

In 2026, the NCAA ruled that quarterback Cade McNamara was ineligible to play for Iowa due to tampering violations, as Kirk Ferentz and assistant coah Jon Budmayr had broken NCAA rules by contacting McNamara before he entered the transfer portal. As a result, the NCAA forced Iowa to vacate the four victories in which McNamara played before he suffered a season-ending injury. The four games Iowa vacated were the wins over Utah State, Iowa State, Western Michigan, and Michigan State.

== Preseason ==
Iowa lost several players in the transfer portal, including top two wide receivers Keagan Johnson and Arland Bruce IV, backup quarterback Alex Padilla, and running back Gavin Williams. Two top defensive players, cornerback Terry Roberts and linebacker Jestin Jacobs, transferred to Miami and Oregon, respectively.

Iowa added players in the transfer portal before the 2023 season, including Michigan quarterback Cade McNamara, Michigan tight end Erick All, and Charleston Southern wide receiver Seth Anderson, son of NFL wide receiver Flipper Anderson. Saginaw Valley State offensive tackle Daijon Parker committed to Iowa after originally committing to Virginia.

Iowa was picked second in the West Division by Big Ten media, behind Wisconsin.

== Player movement ==
=== Transfers in ===
Date	Player	Position	Previous Team	Notes	Ref
December 1, 2022	Cade McNamara	QB	Michigan Wolverines	Third-team All-Big Ten (2021)	
December 14, 2022	Erick All	TE	Michigan Wolverines		
January 1, 2023	Seth Anderson	WR	Charleston Southern Buccaneers	2022 Big South Conference offensive freshman of the year	
January 4, 2023	Deacon Hill	QB	Wisconsin Badgers		
January 7, 2023	Daijon Parker	OT	Saginaw Valley State	Previously committed to Virginia	
February 8, 2023	Nick Jackson	LB	Virginia	2022 All-ACC Second Team	
May 4, 2023	Kaleb Brown	WR	Ohio State		
June 16, 2023	Rusty Feth	OG	Miami (OH)	2022 All-MAC Second Team	

=== Transfers out ===
Date	Player	Position	Destination	Notes	Ref
November 29, 2022	Alex Padilla	QB	SMU Mustangs		
November 29, 2022	Josh Volk	OL	Northern Iowa Panthers		
December 1, 2022	Keagan Johnson	WR	Kansas State Wildcats		
December 2, 2022	Arland Bruce IV	WR	Oklahoma State Cowboys		
December 2, 2022	Gavin Williams	RB	Northern Illinois Huskies		
December 5, 2022	Jestin Jacobs	LB	Oregon Ducks	2-year starter at LB (before injury)	
January 6, 2023	Dallas Craddieth	S	Kent State Golden Flashes		
January 8, 2023	Reggie Bracy	CB	Troy Trojans		
April 30, 2023	Carter Erickson	S	Northwest Missouri State Bearcats		
May 4, 2023	Carson May	QB	Wyoming Cowboys	Previously committed to CCC Red Ravens	
May 13, 2023	Zach Brand	RB	Northern Iowa Panthers		
June 8, 2023	Terry Roberts	CB	Michigan State Spartans	Previously committed to Miami	

== Schedule ==
Date	Time	Opponent	Rank	Site	TV	Result	Attendance	Source
September 2	11:00 a.m.	Utah State*	No. 25	Kinnick Stadium; Iowa City, IA	FS1	W 24–14 (vacated)	69,250	
September 9	2:30 p.m.	at Iowa State*		Jack Trice Stadium; Ames, IA (rivalry)	FOX	W 20–13 (vacated)	61,500	
September 16	2:30 p.m.	Western Michigan*	No. 25	Kinnick Stadium; Iowa City, IA	BTN	W 41–10 (vacated)	69,250	
September 23	6:30 p.m.	at No. 7 Penn State	No. 24	Beaver Stadium; University Park, PA	CBS	L 0–31	110,830	
September 30	6:30 p.m.	Michigan State		Kinnick Stadium; Iowa City, IA	NBC	W 26–16 (vacated)	69,250	
October 7	2:30 p.m.	Purdue^{†}		Kinnick Stadium; Iowa City, IA	Peacock	W 20–14	69,250	
October 14	3:00 p.m.	at Wisconsin		Camp Randall Stadium; Madison, WI (rivalry)	FOX	W 15–6	76,205	
October 21	2:30 p.m.	Minnesota	No. 24	Kinnick Stadium; Iowa City, IA (rivalry)	NBC	L 10–12	69,250	
November 4	2:30 p.m.	vs. Northwestern		Wrigley Field; Chicago, IL	Peacock	W 10–7	38,000	
November 11	2:30 p.m.	Rutgers	No. 22	Kinnick Stadium; Iowa City, IA	BTN	W 22–0	69,250	
November 18	2:30 p.m.	Illinois	No. 16	Kinnick Stadium; Iowa City, IA	FS1	W 15–13	69,250	
November 24	11:00 a.m.	at Nebraska	No. 17	Memorial Stadium; Lincoln, NE (rivalry)	CBS	W 13–10	86,183	
December 2	7:00 p.m.	vs. No. 2 Michigan*	No. 16	Lucas Oil Stadium; Indianapolis, IN (Big Ten Championship Game, Big Noon Kickoff)	FOX	L 0–26	67,842	
January 1, 2024	12:00 p.m.	vs. No. 21 Tennessee*	No. 17	Camping World Stadium; Orlando, FL (Citrus Bowl)	ABC	L 0–35	43,861	
*Non-conference game; ^{†}Homecoming; Rankings from AP Poll (and CFP Rankings, after October 31) - Released prior to game; All times are in Central time; Source:

== Rankings ==
Ranking movements Legend: ██ Increase in ranking ██ Decrease in ranking — = Not ranked RV = Received votes
	Week															
Poll	Pre	1	2	3	4	5	6	7	8	9	10	11	12	13	14	Final
AP	25	RV	25	24	—	—	RV	24	—	—	RV	RV	20	18	20	24
Coaches	RV	RV	24	22	RV	RV	RV	23	RV	RV	RV	23	19	17	17	22
CFP	Not released									—	22	16	17	16	17	Not released

== Roster ==
2023 Iowa Hawkeyes football team roster
Players
Coaches
Offense

Pos.	#	Name	Class
QB	12	Cade McNamara (injured)	Sr
QB	5	Joe Labas	So
QB	10	Deacon Hill	So
QB	11	Marco Lainez	Fr
QB	19	Tommy Poholsky	Fr
RB	2	Kaleb Johnson	So
RB	28	Kamari Moulton	Fr
RB	9	Jaziun Patterson	Fr
RB	8	Terrell Washington, Jr.	Fr
RB	22	Max White	So
RB	4	Leshon Williams	Jr
FB	88	Hayden Large	Sr
FB	31	Eli Miller	So
FB	41	Rusty VanWetzinga	Fr
WR	6	Seth Anderson	So
WR	7	Jacob Bostick	Fr
WR	3	Kaleb Brown	So
WR	84	Jarriett Buie	Fr
WR	17	Alex Eichmann	Fr
WR	16	Graham Friedrichsen	Fr
WR	20	Dayton Howard	Fr
WR	15	Jack Johnson	Jr
WR	29	Judah Mallette	Fr
WR	26	Aidan McDermott	Fr
WR	14	Alex Mota	Fr
WR	13	Reese Osgood	Fr
WR	25	Ayden Price	Fr
WR	89	Nico Ragaini	Sr
WR	0	Diante Vines	Jr
WR	21	Kaden Wetjen	Jr
WR	18	Alec Wick	So
TE	83	Erick All (injured)	Sr
TE	85	Luke Lachey (injured)	Jr
TE	44	Grant Leeper	Fr
TE	49	Andrew Lentsch	So
TE	48	Zach Ortwerth	Fr
TE	87	Addison Ostrenga	So
TE	82	Johnny Pascuzzi	So
TE	86	Steven Stilianos	Sr
TE	40	Jalyn Thompson	Fr
TE	81	Cael Vanderbush	Fr
OL	66	Jeremy Chaplin	So
OL	77	Connor Colby	Jr
OL	56	Nick DeJong	Sr
OL	71	Jack Dotzler	Fr
OL	67	Gennings Dunker	So
OL	76	Tyler Elsbury	Jr
OL	52	Asher Fahey	Jr
OL	64	Leighton Jones	Fr
C	65	Logan Jones	Jr
OL	72	Kale Krogh	Fr
OL	74	Trevor Lauck	Fr
OL	75	Cannon Leonard	Fr
OL	59	Griffin Liddle	So
OL	60	Rusty Feth	Sr
OL	53	Michael Myslinski	So
OL	79	Daijon Parker	Sr
OL	58	Kade Pieper	Fr
OL	78	Mason Richman	Jr
OL	70	Beau Stephens	So
OL	73	Kyson Van Vugt	Fr
OL	61	Cael Winter	Fr

Defense

Pos.	#	Name	Class
DE	90	Brian Allen	Fr
DE	93	Anu Dokun	Jr
DE	13	Joe Evans	Sr
DL	94	Yahya Black	Jr
DL	56	Maddux Borcherding-Johnson	Fr
DL	91	Chase Brackney	Fr
DL	86	Jeff Bowie	So
DL	45	Deontae Craig	Jr
DL	97	Caden Crawford	Fr
DL	33	Jackson Filer	Jr
DL	51	Luke Gaffney	Fr
DL	95	Aaron Graves	So
DL	57	Will Hubert	Fr
DL	49	Ethan Hurkett	Jr
DL	87	Andrew Kraus	Fr
DL	48	Max Llewellyn	So
DL	85	Logan Lee	Sr
DL	44	Kenneth Merrieweather	Fr
DL	55	Jeremiah Pittman	So
DL	98	Chris Reames	Sr
DL	54	Anterio Thompson	So
DT	99	Noah Shannon	Sr
LB	31	Nolan DeLong	Fr
LB	39	Eric Epenesa	So
LB	37	Kyler Fisher	Sr
LB	28	Aidan Hall	Fr
LB	41	Jaden Harrell	So
LB	34	Jay Higgins	Sr
LB	10	Nick Jackson	Sr
LB	32	Ben Kueter	Fr
LB	47	Jack Laughlin	Fr
LB	36	Jayden Montgomery	Fr
LB	35	Tanner Pollock	Jr
LB	12	Jaxon Rexroth	So
LB	43	Karson Sharar	So
LB	40	Josef Smith	Jr
LB	25	Kelby Telander	So
LB	42	Zach Twedt	So
LB	23	Landyn Van Kekerix	Fr
DB	15	Amare Bickham	Fr
DB	29	Sebastian Castro	Sr
DB	5	Teegan Davis	Fr
DB	17	Brenden Deasfernandes	Jr
DB	3	Cooper DeJean (injured)	Jr
DB	4	Koen Entringer	Fr
DB	2	TJ Hall	So
CB	27	Jermari Harris	Jr
DB	16	Jamison Heinz	Jr
DB	20	Deavin Hilson	So
DB	26	Kael Kolarik	Fr
DB	8	Deshaun Lee	Fr
DB	6	Zach Lutmer	Fr
DB	21	Watts McBride	Fr
DB	7	John Nestor	Fr
DB	1	Xavier Nwankpa	So
DB	14	Kahlil Tate	Fr
DB	30	Quinn Schulte	Sr

Special teams

Pos.	#	Name	Class
K	1	Aaron Blom	Jr
K	18	Drew Stevens	So
P	9	Tory Taylor	Sr
LS	39	Luke Elkin	Jr
LS	97	Liam Reardon	Jr

Head coach

- Kirk Ferentz

Coordinators/assistant coaches

- Brian Ferentz – Offensive coordinator/quarterbacks
- Phil Parker – Defensive coordinator/secondary
- LeVar Woods – Special teams coordinator
- George Barnett Offensive line
- Kelvin Bell – Defensive line
- Ladell Betts – Running backs
- Kelton Copeland – Wide receivers
- Abdul Hodge – Tight ends/fullbacks
- Jay Niemann – Assistant defensive line/defensive recruiting coordinator
- Seth Wallace – Assistant defensive coordinator/linebackers
- Raimond Braithwaite – Director, strength and conditioning
- Kammy Powell – Head Football Athletic Trainer

Legend

- (C) Team captain
- (S) Suspended
- (I) Ineligible
- Injured
- Redshirt

Roster
Last update: September 26, 2023

== Game summaries ==
=== Utah State ===
Utah State at No. 25 Iowa

Team	1	2	3	4	Total
Aggies	0	3	3	8	14
• No. 25 Hawkeyes	14	3	0	7	24

- Date: September 2
- Location:
  Kinnick Stadium
  Iowa City, IA
- Game start: 11:05 a.m. CDT
- Elapsed time: 3:33
- Game attendance: 69,250
- Game weather: 80 °F (27 °C), Sunny, Wind SE 8 mph (13 km/h)
- Referee: Jeffrey Servinski
- TV announcers (FS1): Jeff Levering (play-by-play) and Mark Helfrich (analyst)
- Source: Box Score

Scoring summary
1	14:18	Iowa	Seth Anderson 36-yard pass from Cade McNamara (Drew Stevens kick)	Iowa 7–0
1	7:44	Iowa	Erick All 3-yard pass from Cade McNamara (Drew Stevens kick)	Iowa 14–0
2	11:03	USU	William Testa 32-yard field goal	Iowa 14–3
2	0:07	Iowa	Drew Stevens 20-yard field goal	Iowa 17–3
3	12:02	USU	Elliott Nimrod 45-yard field goal	Iowa 17–6
4	10:17	Iowa	Kaleb Johnson 3-yard run (Drew Stevens kick)	Iowa 24–6
4	1:36	USU	Terrell Vaughn 16-yard pass from Cooper Legas (Rahsul Faison pass from Cooper Legas)	Iowa 24–14

The Hawkeyes' season opener was the first matchup in the series since a 48–7 win in 2002. It was also the first Iowa career start for Cade McNamara who threw for 191 yards and two touchdowns to start out the year 1–0.

Statistics	USU	IOWA
First downs	19	17
Total yards	329	284
Rushing yards	116	88
Passing yards	213	196
Turnovers	1	0
Time of possession	27:48	32:12

Team	Category	Player	Statistics
Utah State	Passing	Cooper Legas	32/48, 213 yards, TD, INT
Utah State	Rushing	Rahsul Faison	7 carries, 59 yards
Utah State	Receiving	Terrell Vaughn	12 receptions, 93 yards, TD
Iowa	Passing	Cade McNamara	17/30, 191 yards, 2 TD
Iowa	Rushing	Kaleb Johnson	19 carries, 63 yards, TD
Iowa	Receiving	Luke Lachey	7 receptions, 73 yards

=== at Iowa State ===
Iowa at Iowa State
Cy-Hawk Trophy

Team	1	2	3	4	Total
• Hawkeyes	3	14	3	0	20
Cyclones	0	3	0	10	13

- Date: September 9
- Location:
  Jack Trice Stadium
  Ames, IA
- Game start: 2:41 p.m. CDT
- Elapsed time: 3:07
- Game attendance: 61,500
- Game weather: 80 °F (27 °C), Sunny, Wind SW 5 mph (8.0 km/h)
- Referee: Jerry McGinn
- TV announcers (FOX): Jason Benetti (play-by-play), Brock Huard (analyst), and Allison Williams (sidelines)
- Source: Box Score

Scoring summary
1	5:56	Iowa	Drew Stevens 28-yard field goal	Iowa 3–0
2	13:39	Iowa	Jaziun Patterson 4-yard run (Drew Stevens kick)	Iowa 10–0
2	4:29	Iowa	Sebastian Castro 30-yard interception return (Drew Stevens kick)	Iowa 17–0
2	0:04	ISU	Chase Contreraz 42-yard field goal	Iowa 17–3
3	3:57	Iowa	Drew Stevens 34-yard field goal	Iowa 20–3
4	13:18	ISU	Chase Contreraz 46-yard field goal	Iowa 20–6
4	2:53	ISU	Jayden Higgins 16-yard pass from Rocco Becht (C. Contreraz kick)	Iowa 20–13

The Hawks avenged last season's 10–7 defeat by collecting their sixth straight victory at Jack Trice Stadium, earning Kirk Ferentz his 200th collegiate career win.

Statistics	IOWA	IOWA ST
First downs	9	19
Total yards	235	290
Rushing yards	112	87
Passing yards	123	203
Turnovers	1	1
Time of possession	26:30	33:30

Team	Category	Player	Statistics
Iowa	Passing	Cade McNamara	12/21, 123 yards, INT
Iowa	Rushing	Jaziun Patterson	10 carries, 86 yards, TD
Iowa	Receiving	Luke Lachey	3 receptions, 58 yards
Iowa State	Passing	Rocco Becht	23/44, 203 yards, TD, INT
Iowa State	Rushing	Cartevious Norton	21 carries, 59 yards
Iowa State	Receiving	Jayden Higgins	8 receptions, 95 yards, TD

=== Western Michigan ===
Western Michigan at No. 25 Iowa

Team	1	2	3	4	Total
Broncos	7	3	0	0	10
• No. 25 Hawkeyes	0	14	17	10	41

- Date: September 16
- Location:
  Kinnick Stadium
  Iowa City, IA
- Game start: 2:40 p.m. CDT
- Elapsed time: 3:51
- Game attendance: 69,250
- Game weather: 78 °F (26 °C), Cloudy, Wind NW 6 mph (9.7 km/h)
- Referee: Gregory Blum
- TV announcers (BTN): Lisa Byington (play-by-play), Anthony Herron (analyst), and Shane Sparks (sidelines)
- Source: Box Score

Scoring summary
1	5:40	WMU	Anthony Sambucci 64-yard pass from Treyson Bourguet (Palmer Domschke kick)	WMU 7–0
2	8:26	Iowa	Diante Vines 3-yard pass from Cade McNamara (Drew Stevens kick)	Tied 7–7
2	4:45	WMU	Palmer Domschke 27-yard field goal	WMU 10–7
2	1:29	Iowa	Leshon Williams 25-yard pass from Cade McNamara (Drew Stevens kick)	Iowa 14–10
3	7:30	Iowa	Safety, blocked punt through the end zone	Iowa 16–10
3	4:02	Iowa	Kamari Moulton 3-yard run (Erick All pass from Cade McNamara)	Iowa 24–10
3	2:10	Iowa	Kamari Moulton 1-yard run (Drew Stevens kick)	Iowa 31–10
4	5:20	Iowa	Drew Stevens 31-yard field goal	Iowa 34–10
4	0:30	Iowa	Max White 2-yard run (Drew Stevens kick)	Iowa 41–10

The Hawkeyes evened the all-time series (2–2), building on the 59–3 victory in 2013. A blocked punt in the third quarter that resulted in a safety proved to be the turning point in cementing Iowa's upper hand. After trailing 10–7 in the second quarter, the Hawks scored the final 34 points of the game.

Statistics	WMU	IOWA
First downs	8	19
Total yards	239	387
Rushing yards	117	254
Passing yards	122	133
Turnovers	1	2
Time of possession	26:07	33:53

Team	Category	Player	Statistics
Western Michigan	Passing	Treyson Bourguet	5/16, 124 yards, TD
Western Michigan	Rushing	Treyson Bourguet	8 carries, 32 yards
Western Michigan	Receiving	Kenneth Womack	2 receptions, 11 yards
Iowa	Passing	Cade McNamara	9/19, 103 yards, 2 TD, 2 INT
Iowa	Rushing	Leshon Williams	12 carries, 145 yards
Iowa	Receiving	Steven Stilianos	2 receptions, 29 yards

=== at No. 7 Penn State ===
No. 24 Iowa at No. 7 Penn State

Team	1	2	3	4	Total
No. 24 Hawkeyes	0	0	0	0	0
• No. 7 Nittany Lions	3	7	14	7	31

- Date: September 23
- Location:
  Beaver Stadium
  University Park, PA
- Game start: 7:41 p.m. EDT
- Elapsed time: 3:04
- Game attendance: 110,830
- Game weather: 53 °F (12 °C), Rain, Wind NE 15 mph (24 km/h)
- Referee: Chris Coyle
- TV announcers (CBS): Brad Nessler (play-by-play), Gary Danielson (color), and Jenny Dell (sideline)
- Source: Box Score

Scoring summary
1	1:35	PSU	Alex Felkins 46-yard field goal	PSU 3–0
2	9:17	PSU	Khalil Dinkins 9-yard pass from Drew Allar (A. Felkins kick)	PSU 10–0
3	8:20	PSU	Tyler Warren 2-yard pass from Drew Allar (Alex Felkins kick)	PSU 17–0
3	1:01	PSU	Tyler Warren 7-yard pass from Drew Allar (Alex Felkins kick)	PSU 24–0
4	12:19	PSU	KeAndre Lambert-Smith 3-yard pass from Drew Allar (Alex Felkins kick)	PSU 31–0

In a game played under the lights in Happy Valley between two unbeaten top 25 teams, Iowa was humbled by the Nittany Lions. The Hawkeyes, wearing alternate uniforms, were dominated in every phase of the game.

Statistics	IOWA	PSU
First downs	4	28
Total yards	76	397
Rushing yards	20	215
Passing yards	56	182
Turnovers	4	0
Time of possession	14:33	45:27

Team	Category	Player	Statistics
Iowa	Passing	Cade McNamara	5/14, 42 yards
Iowa	Rushing	Kamari Moulton	6 carries, 18 yards
Iowa	Receiving	Erick All	3 receptions, 35 yards
Penn State	Passing	Drew Allar	25/37, 166 yards, 4 TD
Penn State	Rushing	Kaytron Allen	21 carries, 72 yards
Penn State	Receiving	KeAndre Lambert-Smith	8 receptions, 66 yards, TD

=== Michigan State ===
Michigan State at Iowa

Team	1	2	3	4	Total
Spartans	3	6	7	0	16
• Hawkeyes	3	7	3	13	26

- Date: September 30
- Location:
  Kinnick Stadium
  Iowa City, IA
- Game start: 6:37 pm CDT
- Elapsed time: 3:31
- Game attendance: 69,250
- Game weather: 88 °F (31 °C), Sunny, Wind SE 10 mph (16 km/h)
- Referee: Mark Kluczynski
- TV announcers (NBC): Noah Eagle (play-by-play), Todd Blackledge (analyst), Kathryn Tappen (sideline)
- Source: Box Score

Scoring summary
1	11:25	Iowa	Drew Stevens 40-yard field goal	Iowa 3–0
1	3:48	MSU	Jonathan Kim 31-yard field goal	Tied 3–3
2	11:04	MSU	Jonathan Kim 32-yard field goal	MSU 6–3
2	3:48	Iowa	Erick All 13-yard pass from Deacon Hill (Drew Stevens kick)	Iowa 10–6
2	0:00	MSU	Jonathan Kim 58-yard field goal	Iowa 10–9
3	13:08	MSU	Cal Haladay 42-yard fumble return (Jonathan Kim kick)	MSU 16–10
3	7:38	Iowa	Drew Stevens 53-yard field goal	MSU 16–13
4	5:19	Iowa	Drew Stevens 36-yard field goal	Tied 16–16
4	3:45	Iowa	Cooper DeJean 70-yard punt return (Drew Stevens kick)	Iowa 23–16
4	0:59	Iowa	Drew Stevens 34-yard field goal	Iowa 26–16

Iowa recorded back-to-back victories in series for first time since 2009–2010. The Spartans were looking to avenge a humbling loss from their last visit – 49–7 in 2020 – during a week where there head coach Mel Tucker was fired. With Cade McNamara suffering a season-ending knee injury in the first quarter the offense continued to struggle. Cooper DeJean returned a punt 70 yards to give Iowa the lead for good with under four minutes left. This game marked Kirk Ferentz's 200th Big Ten Conference regular season game as Iowa's head coach (116–84).

Statistics	MSU	IOWA
First downs	20	15
Total yards	349	222
Rushing yards	156	61
Passing yards	193	161
Turnovers	3	2
Time of possession	33:48	26:12

Team	Category	Player	Statistics
Michigan State	Passing	Noah Kim	25/44, 193 yards, 3 INT
Michigan State	Rushing	Nate Carter	20 carries, 108 yards
Michigan State	Receiving	Montorie Foster Jr.	8 receptions, 79 yards
Iowa	Passing	Deacon Hill	11/27, 115 yards, TD, INT
Iowa	Rushing	Leshon Williams	12 carries, 38 yards
Iowa	Receiving	Erick All	4 receptions, 67 yards, TD

=== Purdue ===
Purdue at Iowa
Homecoming

Team	1	2	3	4	Total
Boilermakers	0	7	0	7	14
• Hawkeyes	7	3	3	7	20

- Date: October 7
- Location:
  Kinnick Stadium
  Iowa City, IA
- Game start: 2:34 pm CDT
- Elapsed time: 3:16
- Game attendance: 69,250
- Game weather: 57 °F (14 °C), Sunny, Wind NW 9 mph (14 km/h)
- Referee: Larry Smith
- TV announcers (Peacock): Jac Collinsworth (play-by-play), Jason Garrett (analyst), Zora Stephenson (sideline)
- Source: Box Score

Scoring summary
1	10:15	Iowa	Kaleb Johnson 67-yard run (Drew Stevens kick)	Iowa 7–0
2	14:57	Iowa	Drew Stevens 27-yard field goal	Iowa 10–0
2	0:32	Purdue	TJ Sheffield 43-yard pass from Hudson Card (Julio Macias kick)	Iowa 10–7
3	7:58	Iowa	Drew Stevens 23-yard field goal	Iowa 13–7
4	14:24	Iowa	Erick All 22-yard pass from Deacon Hill (Drew Stevens kick)	Iowa 20–7
4	2:54	Purdue	Devin Mockobee 2-yard run (Julio Macias kick)	Iowa 20–14

Purdue had won two of the last three at Kinnick Stadium, the latter of which spoiled the Hawkeyes' homecoming, unbeaten record, and No. 2 AP ranking. They had a chance to win again but were held on a fourth down. This was the first start for QB Deacon Hill in the 1,300th game in Iowa program history. He struggled in the first half but settled down in the second.

Statistics	PUR	IOWA
First downs	21	13
Total yards	343	291
Rushing yards	96	181
Passing yards	247	110
Turnovers	2	1
Time of possession	35:28	24:32

Team	Category	Player	Statistics
Purdue	Passing	Hudson Card	25/40, 247 yards, TD, 2 INT
Purdue	Rushing	Devin Mockobee	20 carries, 89 yards, TD
Purdue	Receiving	TJ Sheffield	6 receptions, 93 yards, TD
Iowa	Passing	Deacon Hill	6/21, 110 yards, TD, INT
Iowa	Rushing	Kaleb Johnson	17 carries, 134 yards, TD
Iowa	Receiving	Erick All	5 receptions, 97 yards, TD

=== at Wisconsin ===
Iowa at Wisconsin
Rivalry

Team	1	2	3	4	Total
• Hawkeyes	0	7	0	8	15
Badgers	0	0	6	0	6

- Date: October 14
- Location:
  Camp Randall Stadium
  Madison, WI
- Game start: 3:05 pm CDT
- Elapsed time: 3:25
- Game attendance: 76,205
- Game weather: 54 °F (12 °C), Cloudy, Wind N 17 mph (27 km/h)
- Referee: Chris Coyte
- TV announcers (FOX): Jason Benetti (play-by-play), Brock Huard (analyst), and Allison Williams (sidelines)
- Source: Box Score

Scoring summary
2	11:49	Iowa	Leshon Williams 82-yard run (Drew Stevens kick)	Iowa 7–0
3	9:55	Wisc	Nathanial Vakos 36-yard field goal	Iowa 7–3
3	3:58	Wisc	Nathanial Vakos 52-yard field goal	Iowa 7–6
4	13:08	Iowa	Drew Stevens 48-yard field goal	Iowa 10–6
4	12:15	Iowa	Team Safety	Iowa 12–6
4	1:55	Iowa	Drew Stevens 40-yard field goal	Iowa 15–6

Iowa won at Wisconsin for the first time since 2015 and recorded back-to-back wins in rivalry series for the first time since 2008–2009. This was a defensive struggle with both teams trading punt after punt. The Hawkeyes never trailed in the game and grabbed a hold of the Big Ten West lead.

Statistics	IOWA	WIS
First downs	9	18
Total yards	237	332
Rushing yards	200	104
Passing yards	37	228
Turnovers	0	2
Time of possession	30:33	29:27

Team	Category	Player	Statistics
Iowa	Passing	Deacon Hill	6/14, 37 yards
Iowa	Rushing	Leshon Williams	25 carries, 174 yards, TD
Iowa	Receiving	Erick All	2 receptions, 19 yards
Wisconsin	Passing	Braedyn Locke	15/30, 122 yards, INT
Wisconsin	Rushing	Braelon Allen	18 carries, 87 yards
Wisconsin	Receiving	Bryson Green	5 receptions, 86 yards

=== Minnesota ===
Minnesota at No. 24 Iowa
Floyd of Rosedale

Team	1	2	3	4	Total
• Golden Gophers	3	0	6	3	12
No. 24 Hawkeyes	3	7	0	0	10

- Date: October 21
- Location:
  Kinnick Stadium
  Iowa City, IA
- Game start: 2:33 pm CDT
- Elapsed time: 3:38
- Game attendance: 69,250
- Game weather: 67 °F (19 °C), Sunny, Wind NW 22 mph (35 km/h)
- Referee: Tim O'Dey
- TV announcers (NBC): Paul Burmeister (play-by-play), Anthony Herron (analyst), Zora Stephenson (sideline)
- Source: Box Score

Scoring summary
1	10:35	Iowa	Drew Stevens 23-yard field goal	Iowa 3–0
1	0:17	Minn	Dragan Kesich 43-yard field goal	Tied 3–3
2	0:49	Iowa	Deacon Hill 1-yard run (Drew Stevens kick)	Iowa 10–3
3	8:59	Minn	Dragan Kesich 44-yard field goal	Iowa 10–6
3	2:25	Minn	Dragan Kesich 28-yard field goal	Iowa 10–9
4	8:33	Minn	Dragan Kesich 31-yard field goal	Minn 12–10

The Hawkeyes, ranked in the top 25 again after a 3-week absence, had won eight straight and 9 of 10 in the series entering the game. Minnesota won at Kinnick Stadium for the first time since 1999. A controversial penalty upset Iowa fans at the end of the game, negating a potential game-winning touchdown by Cooper DeJean.

Statistics	MIN	IOWA
First downs	12	9
Total yards	239	127
Rushing yards	113	11
Passing yards	126	116
Turnovers	0	3
Time of possession	35:25	24:35

Team	Category	Player	Statistics
Minnesota	Passing	Athan Kaliakmanis	10/25, 126 yards
Minnesota	Rushing	Darius Taylor	16 carries, 59 yards
Minnesota	Receiving	Daniel Jackson	7 receptions, 101 yards
Iowa	Passing	Deacon Hill	10/28, 116 yards, INT
Iowa	Rushing	Kaleb Johnson	6 carries, 18 yards
Iowa	Receiving	Nico Ragaini	4 receptions, 28 yards

=== at Northwestern ===
Iowa at Northwestern

Team	1	2	3	4	Total
• Hawkeyes	0	0	7	3	10
Wildcats	0	0	0	7	7

- Date: November 4
- Location:
  Wrigley Field
  Chicago, IL
- Game start: 2:30 pm CDT
- Elapsed time: 3:05
- Referee: Ron Snodgrass
- TV announcers (Peacock): Paul Burmeister (play-by-play), Kyle Rudolph (analyst), Zora Stephenson (sideline)
- Source: Box Score

Scoring summary
3	9:04	Iowa	Addison Ostrenga 2-yard pass from Deacon Hill (Drew Stevens kick)	Iowa 7–0
4	1:50	NW	Cam Johnson 5-yard pass from Brendan Sullivan (J. Olsen kick)	Tied 7–7
4	0:14	Iowa	Drew Stevens 52-yard field goal	Iowa 10–7

Iowa has won four of five in this series. The game at Wrigley Field was the first time the Hawkeyes have played on a baseball field since the 2017 Pinstripe Bowl. The game was yet another defensive struggle with neither team even scoring in the first half. Hawkeye kicker Drew Stevens nailed a 52-yard field goal with seconds left to defeat the Wildcats.

Statistics	IOWA	NW
First downs	14	12
Total yards	169	170
Rushing yards	104	89
Passing yards	65	81
Turnovers	1	0
Time of possession	30:18	29:42

Team	Category	Player	Statistics
Iowa	Passing	Deacon Hill	10/15, 65 yards, TD, INT
Iowa	Rushing	Leshon Williams	24 carries, 79 yards
Iowa	Receiving	Addison Ostrenga	3 receptions, 15 yards, TD
Northwestern	Passing	Brendan Sullivan	12/19, 81 yards, TD
Northwestern	Rushing	Anthony Tyus III	10 carries, 40 yards
Northwestern	Receiving	A. J. Henning	4 receptions, 13 yards

=== Rutgers ===
Rutgers at No. 22 Iowa

Team	1	2	3	4	Total
Scarlet Knights	0	0	0	0	0
• No. 22 Hawkeyes	0	3	3	16	22

- Date: November 11
- Location:
  Kinnick Stadium
  Iowa City, IA
- Game start: 2:46 pm CST
- Elapsed time: 3:04
- Game attendance: 69,250
- Game weather: 50 °F (10 °C), Cloudy, Wind SE 11 mph (18 km/h)
- Referee: Larry Smith
- TV announcers (BTN): Cory Provus (play-by-play), Jake Butt (analyst), and Brooke Fletcher (sideline)
- Source: Box Score

Scoring summary
2	2:50	Iowa	Drew Stevens 32-yard field goal	Iowa 3–0
3	4:18	Iowa	Drew Stevens 43-yard field goal	Iowa 6–0
4	13:38	Iowa	Jaz Patterson 4-yard run (pass failed)	Iowa 12–0
4	5:43	Iowa	Drew Stevens 24-yard field goal	Iowa 15–0
4	4:39	Iowa	Kaleb Brown 10-yard pass from Deacon Hill (Drew Stevens kick)	Iowa 22–0

Kirk Ferentz has yet to lose to Rutgers, and this victory tied him with Bo Schembechler in career wins (194) as a Big Ten coach. After struggling to score in the first half, the Hawkeyes found their rhythm in the second. Iowa is now 4–0 against the Scarlet Knights all-time, shutting them out for a second time.

Statistics	RUT	IOWA
First downs	7	21
Total yards	127	402
Rushing yards	34	179
Passing yards	93	223
Turnovers	1	1
Time of possession	21:38	38:22

Team	Category	Player	Statistics
Rutgers	Passing	Gavin Wimsatt	7/18, 93 yards, INT
Rutgers	Rushing	Kyle Monangai	13 carries, 39 yards
Rutgers	Receiving	Ian Strong	3 receptions, 47 yards
Iowa	Passing	Deacon Hill	20/31, 223 yards, TD, INT
Iowa	Rushing	Leshon Williams	13 carries, 63 yards
Iowa	Receiving	Addison Ostrenga	8 receptions, 47 yards

=== Illinois ===
Illinois at No. 16 Iowa

Team	1	2	3	4	Total
Fighting Illini	3	7	0	3	13
• No. 16 Hawkeyes	2	7	0	6	15

- Date: November 18
- Location:
  Kinnick Stadium
  Iowa City, IA
- Game start: 2:36 pm CDT
- Elapsed time: 3:33
- Game attendance: 69,250
- Game weather: 59 °F (15 °C), Sunny, Wind SW 10 mph (16 km/h)
- Referee: Jerry McGinn
- TV announcers (FS1): Adam Alexander (play-by-play) and Devin Gardner (analyst)
- Source: Box Score

Scoring summary
1	11:24	Iowa	Safety, John Paddock sacked in end zone by Joe Evans	Iowa 2–0
1	3:19	ILL	Caleb Griffin 52-yard field goal	Illinois 3–2
2	10:20	Iowa	Addison Ostrenga 4-yard pass from Deacon Hill (Drew Stevens kick)	Iowa 9–3
2	6:53	ILL	Reggie Love III 1-yard run (Caleb Griffin kick)	Illinois 10–9
4	14:56	ILL	Caleb Griffin 29-yard field goal	Illinois 13–9
4	4:43	Iowa	Kaleb Johnson 30-yard run (Drew Stevens kick blocked)	Iowa 15–13

Illinois broke a long losing streak in the series in previous year, but has not won at Kinnick Stadium since 1999. A victory on Senior Day gave the Hawkeyes the Big Ten West outright, and Kirk Ferentz moved all alone into third place in career wins as a Big Ten head coach.

Statistics	ILL	IOWA
First downs	18	18
Total yards	280	281
Rushing yards	65	114
Passing yards	215	167
Turnovers	0	0
Time of possession	26:02	33:58

Team	Category	Player	Statistics
Illinois	Passing	John Paddock	22/47, 215 yards
Illinois	Rushing	Reggie Love III	18 carries, 64 yards, TD
Illinois	Receiving	Isaiah Williams	8 receptions, 105 yards
Iowa	Passing	Deacon Hill	19/29, 167 yards, TD
Iowa	Rushing	Leshon Williams	16 carries, 54 yards
Iowa	Receiving	Kaleb Brown	7 receptions, 71 yards

=== at Nebraska ===
No. 17 Iowa at Nebraska
Rivalry

Team	1	2	3	4	Total
• No. 17 Hawkeyes	0	10	0	3	13
Cornhuskers	0	7	3	0	10

- Date: November 24
- Location:
  Memorial Stadium
  Lincoln, NE
- Game start: 11:10 am CDT
- Elapsed time: 3:20
- Game attendance: 86,183
- Game weather: 26 °F (−3 °C), Cloudy, Wind NE 13 mph (21 km/h)
- Referee: Gregory Blum
- TV announcers (CBS): Tom McCarthy (play-by-play), Ross Tucker (analyst), Tiffany Blackmon (sideline)
- Source: Box Score

Scoring summary
2	13:22	Iowa	Deacon Hill 1-yard run (Drew Stevens kick)	Iowa 7–0
2	5:12	Iowa	Drew Stevens 28-yard field goal	Iowa 10–0
2	3:43	Neb	Jaylen Lloyd 66-yard pass from Chubba Purdy (Tristan Alvano kick)	Iowa 10–7
3	6:18	Neb	Tristan Alvano 44-yard field goal	Tied 10–10
4	0:00	Iowa	Marshall Meeder 38-yard field goal	Iowa 13–10

In this rivalry matchup, No. 17 Iowa racked up its 10th win of the season, its sixth straight win in Lincoln, and kept Nebraska from reaching bowl eligibility for the first time since 2016 as they recaptured the Heroes Trophy. After having two field goals blocked earlier in the game, Iowa kicked a game-winner as time expired to escape with the victory.

Statistics	IOWA	NEB
First downs	14	10
Total yards	257	264
Rushing yards	163	75
Passing yards	94	189
Turnovers	1	3
Time of possession	31:45	28:15

Team	Category	Player	Statistics
Iowa	Passing	Deacon Hill	11/28, 94 yards, INT
Iowa	Rushing	Leshon Williams	16 carries, 111 yards
Iowa	Receiving	Kaleb Brown	3 receptions, 21 yards
Nebraska	Passing	Chubba Purdy	15/28, 189 yards, TD, INT
Nebraska	Rushing	Chubba Purdy	12 carries, 42 yards
Nebraska	Receiving	Billy Kemp	4 receptions, 21 yards

=== vs. No. 2 Michigan (Big Ten Championship game) ===
No. 2 Michigan vs. No. 16 Iowa
Big Ten Championship Game

Team	1	2	3	4	Total
• No. 2 Wolverines	10	0	10	6	26
No. 16 Hawkeyes	0	0	0	0	0

- Date: December 2, 2023
- Location:
  Lucas Oil Stadium
  Indianapolis, IN
- Game start: 8:17 pm EST
- Elapsed time: 3:17
- Game attendance: 67,842
- Game weather: Indoors (retractable roof closed)
- Referee: Jeff Servinski
- TV announcers (FOX): Gus Johnson (play-by-play), Joel Klatt (analyst) & Jenny Taft (sideline)
- Source: Box Score

Scoring summary
1	6:01	MICH	James Turner 35-yard field goal	MICH 3–0
1	1:07	MICH	Blake Corum 2-yard run (James Turner kick)	MICH 10–0
3	9:09	MICH	Blake Corum 6-yard run (James Turner kick)	MICH 17–0
3	0:22	MICH	James Turner 46-yard field goal	MICH 20–0
4	9:14	MICH	James Turner 36-yard field goal	MICH 23–0
4	3:38	MICH	James Turner 50-yard field goal	MICH 26–0

Fox's Big Noon Kickoff was on hand for this top 20 match-up. Iowa was attempting to defeat Michigan for the first time since 2016 and earn the program's first outright Big Ten title since 1985, but it wasn't to be. Two years after being humbled by the Wolverines in the Big The Championship Game, the Hawkeyes were unable to pose a scoring threat in this one and were blanked 26–0.

Statistics	MICH	IOWA
First downs	13	7
Total yards	213	155
Rushing yards	66	35
Passing yards	147	120
Turnovers	0	3
Time of possession	36:32	23:28

Team	Category	Player	Statistics
Michigan	Passing	J. J. McCarthy	22/30, 147 yards
Michigan	Rushing	Blake Corum	16 carries, 52 yards, 2 TD
Michigan	Receiving	Cornelius Johnson	9 receptions, 64 yards
Iowa	Passing	Deacon Hill	18/32, 120 yards
Iowa	Rushing	Leshon Williams	9 carries, 25 yards
Iowa	Receiving	Addison Ostrenga	7 receptions, 50 yards

=== vs. No. 21 Tennessee (Citrus Bowl) ===
No. 21 Tennessee vs. No. 17 Iowa
Citrus Bowl

Team	1	2	3	4	Total
No. 17 Hawkeyes	0	0	0	0	0
• No. 21 Volunteers	0	14	7	14	35

- Date: January 1, 2024
- Location:
  Camping World Stadium
  Orlando, FL
- Game start: 1:07 p.m. EST
- Elapsed time: 3:09
- Game attendance: 43,861
- Game weather: 67 °F (19 °C), Sunny, Wind W 6 mph (9.7 km/h)
- Referee: Jeff Heaser (ACC)
- TV announcers (ABC): Dave Flemming (play-by-play), Brock Osweiler (analyst), and Kayla Burton (sideline)
- Source: Box Score

Scoring summary
2	14:54	Tenn	Nico Iamaleava 19-yard run (Charles Campbell kick)	Tennessee 7–0
2	8:12	Tenn	Nico Iamaleava 3-yard run (Charles Campbell kick)	Tennessee 14–0
3	1:43	Tenn	Nico Iamaleava 2-yard run (Charles Campbell kick)	Tennessee 21–0
4	14:15	Tenn	James Pearce Jr. 52-yard interception return (Charles Campbell kick)	Tennessee 28–0
4	4:48	Tenn	McCallan Castles 18-yard pass from Nico Iamaleava (Charles Campbell kick)	Tennessee 35–0

Iowa made its second Citrus Bowl appearance in three years and third overall. The Hawkeyes, looking to redeem themselves in three phases - being shut out in previous game, a narrow loss in last Citrus Bowl appearance, and being blown out by Tennessee in a bowl game nine years prior, were dominated from start to finish in Brian Ferentz's last game as offensive coordinator.

Statistics	IOWA	TENN
First downs	11	25
Total yards	173	383
Rushing yards	113	232
Passing yards	60	151
Turnovers	3	0
Time of possession	29:48	30:12

Team	Category	Player	Statistics
Iowa	Passing	Deacon Hill	7/18, 56 yards, 2 INT
Iowa	Rushing	Marco Lainez	6 carries, 51 yards
Iowa	Receiving	Kaleb Brown	3 receptions, 39 yards
Tennessee	Passing	Nico Iamaleava	12/19, 151 yards, TD
Tennessee	Rushing	Dylan Sampson	20 carries, 133 yards
Tennessee	Receiving	Ramel Keyton	3 receptions, 51 yards

== Awards and honors ==
Individual Awards
Player/Coach	Award	Ref.
Cooper DeJean	Tatum–Woodson Defensive Back of the Year; Rodgers–Dwight Return Specialist of the Year; Unanimous All-American	
Tory Taylor	Eddleman–Fields Punter of the Year; Ray Guy Award; Unanimous All-American	
Phil Parker	Broyles Award	

== Players drafted into the NFL ==
Round	Pick	Player	Position	NFL Club
2	40	Cooper DeJean	CB	Philadelphia Eagles
4	115	Erick All	TE	Cincinnati Bengals
4	122	Tory Taylor	P	Chicago Bears
6	178	Logan Lee	DT	Pittsburgh Steelers
