= 2024 Citrus Bowl (January) =

Postseason college football bowl game

2024 Cheez-It Citrus Bowl
- 78th Citrus Bowl
Iowa Hawkeyes	Tennessee Volunteers
(10–3)	(8–4)
Big Ten	SEC
0	35
Head coach: Kirk Ferentz	Head coach: Josh Heupel
AP / Coaches / CFP; 20 / 17 / 17	AP / Coaches / CFP; 25 / 23 / 21
	1	2	3	4	Total
Iowa	0	0	0	0	0
Tennessee	0	14	7	14	35
- Date: January 1, 2024
- Season: 2023
- Stadium: Camping World Stadium
- Location: Orlando, Florida
- MVP: Nico Iamaleava (QB, Tennessee)
- Favorite: Tennessee by 8.5
- Referee: Jeff Heaser (ACC)
- Attendance: 43,861

United States TV coverage
- Network: ABC; ESPN Radio
- Announcers: Dave Flemming (play-by-play), Brock Osweiler (analyst), and Kayla Burton (sideline) (ESPN); Chris Carlin (play-by-play) and Tom Luginbill (analyst) (ESPN Radio)

The 2024 Citrus Bowl was a college football bowl game played on January 1, 2024, at Camping World Stadium in Orlando, Florida. The 78th annual Citrus Bowl featured Iowa of the Big Ten Conference and Tennessee of the Southeastern Conference (SEC). The game began at approximately 1:00 p.m. EST and was aired on ABC. The Citrus Bowl was one of the 2023–24 bowl games concluding the 2023 FBS football season. The game was sponsored by Cheez-It and was officially known as the Cheez-It Citrus Bowl.

== Teams ==
Following the release of the final College Football Playoff (CFP) rankings, the Iowa Hawkeyes, having lost the 2023 Big Ten Football Championship Game, were selected to play the Tennessee Volunteers. This was the third bowl game contested between the schools. Iowa won the 1982 Peach Bowl, 28–22, and Tennessee won the 2015 TaxSlayer Bowl, 45–28. Entering the Citrus Bowl, Tennessee held a 2–1 advantage in the overall series, also winning the Kickoff Classic game, 23–22, to open the 1987 season.

=== Iowa ===
Iowa entered the Citrus Bowl with a 10–3 record (7–2 in the Big Ten). They reached the Big Ten Championship, where they were shut out by Michigan, 26–0. They lost to Penn State and Minnesota during the regular season.

This was Iowa's third Citrus Bowl; the Hawkeyes posted a 1–1 record in prior editions of the game, winning the 2005 edition and losing the 2022 edition.

=== Tennessee ===
Tennessee finished the regular season with an 8–4 record (4–4 in the SEC). They lost to Florida, Alabama, Missouri, and Georgia.

This was Tennessee's sixth Citrus Bowl, tying six other teams for the most appearances in the game. The Volunteers posted a 4–1 record in prior Citrus Bowls, winning the 1983, 1996, 1997 and 2002 games; their loss came in the 1994 edition.

== Halftime show ==
The Citrus Bowl halftime show featured a sponsored performance from singer Gavin DeGraw as well as performances from the University of Iowa Hawkeye Marching Band and University of Tennessee Pride of the Southland Band.

The halftime show announcement initially generated controversy. Under the original halftime show plans, the Hawkeye Marching Band were to play only during pregame and the Pride of the Southland Band were to only play during halftime. This was a change from previous editions of the Citrus Bowl, which allotted time for both marching bands to play during pregame and halftime. In addition to negative social media reactions (using the hashtag "LetTheBandsPlay") receiving coverage from Iowa and Tennessee media outlets, a Change.org petition protesting the change (as well as similar developments in the 2023 Pop-Tarts Bowl and 2023 Frisco Bowl) obtained over 5,000 signatures a day after posting. On December 10, The Citrus Bowl announced on their Twitter and Facebook pages that both marching bands would now play at pregame and halftime, issuing the following statement:

We're working closely with Iowa and Tennessee to design a great experience for this year's Cheez-It Citrus Bowl. The university bands will perform on the field both in pregame and at halftime. We appreciate the creativity and goodwill of the university band leaders to make this possible. During the halftime show presented by Cheez-It Snap'd, our live performance will be followed by traditional bowl game performances from University of Iowa Hawkeye Marching Band and The University of Tennessee Bands - Pride of the Southland Band.

— Cheez-It Citrus Bowl Facebook Page

== Game summary ==
2024 Citrus Bowl (January)

Quarter	1	2	3	4	Total
No. 17 Iowa	0	0	0	0	0
No. 21 Tennessee	0	14	7	14	35

at Camping World Stadium • Orlando, Florida

- Date: Monday, January 1, 2024
- Game time: 1:00 p.m. EST
- Game weather: Sunny • Temperature: 67 °F (19 °C) • Wind: 6 mph (9.7 km/h) W
- Game attendance: 43,861
- Referee: Jeff Reaser
- TV announcers (ABC): Dave Flemming (play-by-play), Brock Osweiler (analyst), and Kayla Burton (sideline)
- Box score

Scoring summary

Quarter	Time	Drive			Team	Scoring information	Score	
Quarter	Time	Plays	Yards	TOP	Team	Scoring information	IOWA	TEN
2	14:54	7	73	2:13	Tennessee	Nico Iamaleava 19-yard touchdown run, Charles Campbell kick good	0	7
2	8:12	11	68	5:09	Tennessee	Nico Iamaleava 3-yard touchdown run, Charles Campbell kick good	0	14
3	1:43	2	2	0:42	Tennessee	Nico Iamaleava 2-yard touchdown run, Charles Campbell kick good	0	21
4	14:15	6	24	2:28	Tennessee	Interception returned 52 yards for touchdown by James Pearce Jr., Charles Campbell kick good	0	28
4	4:48	8	78	3:16	Tennessee	McCallan Castles 18-yard touchdown reception from Nico Iamaleava, Charles Campbell kick good	0	35
"TOP" = time of possession. For other American football terms, see Glossary of American football.							0	35

=== Statistics ===
Statistics	IOWA	TEN
First downs	11	25
Plays–yards	61–173	74–383
Rushes–yards	36–113	54–232
Passing yards	60	151
Passing: comp–att–int	9–25–3	12–20–0
Time of possession	28:48	31:12

Team	Category	Player	Statistics
Iowa	Passing	Deacon Hill	7–18, 56 yards, 2 INT
Iowa	Rushing	Marco Lainez	6 carries, 51 yards
Iowa	Receiving	Kaleb Brown	3 catches, 39 yards
Tennessee	Passing	Nico Iamaleava	12–19, 151 yards, TD
Tennessee	Rushing	Dylan Sampson	20 attempts, 133 yards
Tennessee	Receiving	Ramel Keyton	3 catches, 51 yards
