= 2024 Citrus Bowl =

2024 Citrus Bowl may refer to:

- 2024 Citrus Bowl (January), contested following the 2023 season, between Iowa and Tennessee on January 1, 2024
- 2024 Citrus Bowl (December), contested following the 2024 season, between Illinois and South Carolina on December 31, 2024
