= Daniel Pierce (baseball) =

American baseball player (born 2006)

Tampa Bay Rays
- Shortstop
- Born: August 4, 2006 (age 20); Lawrenceville, Georgia, U.S.
- Bats: Right Throws: Right

Joseph Daniel Pierce (born August 4, 2006) is an American professional baseball shortstop in the Tampa Bay Rays organization.

== Amateur career ==
Pierce attended Mill Creek High School in Hoschton, Georgia. As a junior in 2024, he batted .345 with two home runs and 25 RBI along with 13 stolen bases. During the 2024 summer season, Pierce batted .408 with two home runs and 26 RBI.

Pierce entered his senior year in 2025 as a top prospect for the upcoming MLB draft. He finished his senior season slashing .451/.605/.939 with eight home runs, 27 RBI, and 18 stolen bases. He committed to play college baseball at the University of Georgia.

== Professional career ==
Pierce was selected by the Tampa Bay Rays in the first round with the 14th overall pick in the 2025 Major League Baseball draft. He signed with Tampa Bay for a $4.31 million signing bonus on July 18.

Pierce made his professional debut in 2026 with the Single-A Charleston RiverDogs and was named the Carolina League Player of the Week on April 13 after hitting three home runs with ten RBI across six games. He played in 34 games and batted .252 with four home runs and 24 RBI. On June 1, Pierce was placed on the injured list with a shoulder injury. He later underwent shoulder surgery, ending his season.
