= 2023 All-America college football team =

College football honors

The 2023 All-America college football team includes those players of American college football who have been honored by various selector organizations as the best players at their respective positions. The selector organizations award the "All-America" honor annually following the conclusion of the fall college football season. The original All-America team was the 1889 All-America college football team selected by Caspar Whitney. The National Collegiate Athletic Bureau, which is the National Collegiate Athletic Association's (NCAA) service bureau, compiled in the 1950s the first list of All-Americans, including first-team selections on teams created for a national audience. Since 1957, College Sports Communicators (CSC) have bestowed Academic All-American recognition on male and female athletes in Divisions I, II, and III of the NCAA, as well as NAIA and NJCAA athletes.

The 2023 College Football All-America Team is composed of the following College Football All-American first teams chosen by the following selector organizations: Associated Press (AP), Football Writers Association of America (FWAA), American Football Coaches Association (AFCA), Walter Camp Football Foundation (WCFF), Sporting News (TSN, from its historic name of The Sporting News), Sports Illustrated (SI), The Athletic (Athletic), USA Today (USAT), ESPN, CBS Sports (CBS), College Football News (CFN), Athlon Sports, Phil Steele and Fox Sports (FOX).

Currently, the NCAA compiles consensus All-America teams in the sports of Division I FBS football and Division I men's basketball using a point system computed from All-America teams named by coaches associations or media sources. Players are chosen against other players playing at their position only. To be selected a consensus All-American, players must be chosen to the first team on at least half of the five official selectors recognized by the NCAA. Second and third-team honors are used to break ties. Players named first-team by all five selectors are deemed unanimous All-Americans. Currently, the NCAA recognizes All-Americans selected by the AP, AFCA, FWAA, TSN and the WCFF to determine consensus and unanimous All-Americans.

The following players were recognized as consensus All-Americans for 2023. Unanimous selections are followed by an asterisk (*).

2023 Consensus All-Americans
Name	Position	Year	School
Jayden Daniels	Quarterback	Senior	LSU
Cody Schrader	Running back	Senior	Missouri
Ollie Gordon II*	Running back	Sophomore	Oklahoma State
Rome Odunze	Wide receiver	Senior	Washington
Marvin Harrison Jr.*	Wide receiver	Junior	Ohio State
Malik Nabers*	Wide receiver	Junior	LSU
Brock Bowers*	Tight end	Junior	Georgia
Joe Alt*	Offensive line	Junior	Notre Dame
Olu Fashanu	Offensive line	Senior	Penn State
Cooper Beebe*	Offensive line	Senior	Kansas State
Zak Zinter*	Offensive line	Senior	Michigan
Jackson Powers-Johnson*	Center	Junior	Oregon
Jonah Elliss	Defensive line	Junior	Utah
Johnny Newton	Defensive line	Junior	Illinois
Laiatu Latu*	Defensive line	Senior	UCLA
T'Vondre Sweat*	Defensive line	Senior	Texas
Payton Wilson*	Linebacker	Senior	NC State
Edgerrin Cooper	Linebacker	Senior	Texas A&M
Dallas Turner	Linebacker	Junior	Alabama
Cooper DeJean*	Defensive back	Junior	Iowa
Malaki Starks	Defensive back	Sophomore	Georgia
Xavier Watts*	Defensive back	Senior	Notre Dame
Tory Taylor*	Punter	Senior	Iowa
Graham Nicholson	Kicker	Junior	Miami (OH)
Travis Hunter	All-purpose	Sophomore	Colorado

== Offense ==
=== Quarterback ===
- Jayden Daniels, LSU (AP, AFCA, FWAA, TSN, Athlon Sports, ESPN, CBS, PFF, The Athletic, USAT, SI, FOX, Phil Steele)
- Michael Penix Jr., Washington (WCFF)

=== Running back ===
- Blake Corum, Michigan (AFCA)
- Ollie Gordon II, Oklahoma State (AP, AFCA, FWAA, TSN, WCFF, Athlon Sports, ESPN, CBS, The Athletic, USAT, SI, FOX, Phil Steele)
- Omarion Hampton, North Carolina (WCFF)
- Cody Schrader, Missouri (AP, TSN, Athlon Sports, ESPN, CBS, USAT, SI, FOX, Phil Steele)

=== Wide receiver ===
- Marvin Harrison Jr., Ohio State (AP, AFCA, FWAA, TSN, WCFF, ESPN, CBS, Athlon Sports, The Athletic, USAT, SI, FOX, Phil Steele)
- Malik Nabers, LSU (AP, AFCA, FWAA, TSN, WCFF, ESPN, CBS, Athlon Sports, The Athletic, USAT, SI, PFF, FOX, Phil Steele)
- Rome Odunze, Washington (AP, FWAA, TSN, Athlon Sports, CBS, The Athletic, SI, FOX, Phil Steele)

=== Tight end ===
- Brock Bowers, Georgia (AP, AFCA, FWAA, TSN, WCFF, Athlon Sports, ESPN, CBS, The Athletic, PFF, USAT, SI, FOX, Phil Steele)

=== Offensive line ===
- Joe Alt, Notre Dame (AP, AFCA, FWAA, TSN, WCFF, Athlon Sports, ESPN, CBS, The Athletic, USAT, SI, FOX, Phil Steele)
- Cooper Beebe, Kansas State (AP, AFCA, FWAA, TSN, WCFF, Athlon Sports, ESPN, CBS, The Athletic, USAT, SI, FOX, Phil Steele)
- Olu Fashanu, Penn State (AP, AFCA, TSN, WCFF, CBS, Athlon Sports, The Athletic, USAT, SI, FOX)
- Taliese Fuaga, Oregon State (FWAA, Athlon Sports, ESPN, CBS, Phil Steele)
- Sedrick Van Pran-Granger, Georgia (ESPN, SI)
- Zak Zinter, Michigan (AP, AFCA, FWAA, TSN, WCFF, ESPN, Athlon Sports, The Athletic, USAT, SI, FOX, Phil Steele)

=== Center ===
- Jackson Powers-Johnson, Oregon (AP, AFCA, FWAA, TSN, WCFF, CBS, Athlon Sports, The Athletic, USAT, FOX, Phil Steele)

== Defense ==
=== Defensive line ===
- Jonah Elliss, Utah (FWAA, TSN, WCFF, FOX, Phil Steele)
- Jalen Green, James Madison (AP, WCFF, Athlon Sports, The Athletic, USAT, SI)
- Laiatu Latu, UCLA (AP, AFCA, FWAA, TSN, WCFF, Athlon Sports, ESPN, CBS, The Athletic, USAT, SI, FOX, Phil Steele)
- Johnny Newton, Illinois (AP, AFCA, FWAA, TSN, Athlon Sports, ESPN, CBS, The Athletic, USAT, SI, FOX, Phil Steele)
- T'Vondre Sweat, Texas (AP, AFCA, FWAA, TSN, WCFF, Athlon Sports, ESPN, CBS, The Athletic, USAT, SI, FOX, Phil Steele)
- Jared Verse, Florida State (FWAA)

=== Linebacker ===
- Edgerrin Cooper, Texas A&M (AP, AFCA, WCFF, Athlon Sports, ESPN, CBS, The Athletic, PFF, FOX, Phil Steele)
- Jason Henderson, Old Dominion (TSN, WCFF, Athlon Sports)
- Jay Higgins, Iowa (FWAA, USAT, SI, FOX, Phil Steele)
- Dallas Turner, Alabama (AP, AFCA, FWAA, TSN, Athlon Sports, ESPN, CBS, The Athletic, USAT, Phil Steele)
- Payton Wilson, NC State (AP, AFCA, FWAA, TSN, WCFF, Athlon Sports, ESPN, PFF, CBS, The Athletic, USAT, SI, FOX, Phil Steele)
- Jeremiah Trotter Jr., Clemson (ESPN, SI)

=== Defensive back ===
- Terrion Arnold, Alabama (AP, ESPN)
- Beanie Bishop, West Virginia (FWAA, WCFF, Phil Steele)
- Billy Bowman Jr., Oklahoma (CBS)
- Cooper DeJean, Iowa (AP, AFCA, FWAA, WCFF, TSN, Athlon Sports, CBS, The Athletic, USAT, FOX, Phil Steele)
- Will Johnson, Michigan (SI)
- Kool-Aid McKinstry, Alabama (AP, TSN, CBS, Athlon Sports, PFF, USAT, Phil Steele, SI)
- Quinyon Mitchell, Toledo (The Athletic)
- Tyler Nubin, Minnesota (TSN, PFF, Athlon Sports, The Athletic, FOX)
- Mike Sainristil, Michigan (TSN, ESPN, FOX)
- Malaki Starks, Georgia (AP, AFCA, FWAA, WCFF, Athlon Sports, ESPN, CBS, USAT, SI, Phil Steele)
- Trey Taylor, Air Force (AFCA)
- Xavier Watts, Notre Dame (AFCA, AP, FWAA, TSN, WCFF, ESPN, CBS, The Athletic, USAT, SI, FOX, Phil Steele)
- Kris Abrams-Draine, Missouri (Athlon Sports)
- Caleb Downs, Alabama (PFF)

== Special teams ==
=== Kicker ===
- Graham Nicholson, Miami (OH) (AP, AFCA, TSN, WCFF, ESPN, CBS, Athlon Sports, The Athletic, USAT, SI, FOX)
- Jose Pizano, UNLV (FWAA, Phil Steele)
- Joshua Karty, Stanford (PFF)

=== Punter ===
- Tory Taylor, Iowa (AP, AFCA, FWAA, WCFF, TSN, Athlon Sports, ESPN, CBS, The Athletic, USAT, SI, FOX, Phil Steele)
- James Burnip, Alabama (PFF)

=== All-purpose / return specialist ===
- Zachariah Branch, USC (TSN, Athlon Sports, ESPN, USAT)
- Jayden Harrison, Marshall (FWAA, WCFF, Athlon Sports, CBS, FOX, Phil Steele)
- Ashton Jeanty, Boise State (ESPN, USAT)
- Ismail Mahdi, Texas State (CBS)
- Xavier Worthy, Texas (CBS, The Athletic, FOX)
- Cooper DeJean, Iowa (SI)
- Travis Hunter, Colorado (AP, AFCA, FWAA, TSN, SI, Athlon Sports, Phil Steele)
- LaJohntay Wester, Florida Atlantic (FWAA, Phil Steele)
- Sione Vaki, Utah (FOX)
- Barion Brown, Kentucky (TSN)

=== Long snapper ===
- James Rosenberry Jr., FSU (AFCA)
- Joe Shimko, NC State (Phil Steele)

== See also ==
- 2023 FCS College Football All-America Team
- 2023 All-Atlantic Coast Conference football team
- 2023 All-Big 12 Conference football team
- 2023 All-Big Ten Conference football team
- 2023 All-Pac-12 Conference football team
- 2023 All-SEC football team
