= Ryan Robinson (American football) =

American football player (born 1990)

No. 58, 44
- Position: Defensive end

Personal information
- Born: December 9, 1990 (age 35); Charleston, South Carolina, U.S.
- Listed height: 6 ft 3 in (1.91 m)
- Listed weight: 251 lb (114 kg)

Career information
- High school: Hoschton (GA) Mill Creek
- College: Oklahoma State
- NFL draft: 2013: undrafted

Career history
- Oakland Raiders (2013); Seattle Seahawks (2014–2015)

Career NFL statistics
- Total tackles: 4
- Pass deflections: 1
- Stats at Pro Football Reference

Ryan Robinson (born December 9, 1990) is an American former professional football player who was a defensive end in the National Football League (NFL). He played college football for the Oklahoma State Cowboys.

== Early life ==
He played high school football at Mill Creek High School.

== Professional career ==
=== Oakland Raiders ===
He was first signed by the Oakland Raiders as an undrafted free agent in 2013.

=== Seattle Seahawks ===
He was signed by the Seattle Seahawks, but waived on June 15, 2015, after rupturing his Achilles tendon in off season team activities. On September 3, 2016, he was released by the Seahawks as part of final roster cuts.
