= Mill Creek High School =

Public high school in Hoschton, Georgia, United States

Location
- 4400 Braselton Hwy; Hoschton, Georgia 30548; United States; 34°04′44″N 83°52′43″W

Information
- School type: Public
- Motto: Soar
- Established: 2004
- School district: Gwinnett County Public Schools
- Principal: Bryce Fulcher
- Staff: 162.50 (FTE)
- Grades: 9–12
- Enrollment: 2,745 (2023–2024)
- Student to teacher ratio: 16.89
- Colors: Cardinal, Vegas gold, and navy
- Mascot: Harvey the Hawk
- Newspaper: The Mill Creek Chronicle
- Website: www.millcreekhs.com

Mill Creek High School is a high school in Hoschton, Georgia, United States. It serves the area of Hamilton Mill, Gwinnett County, a suburb of Atlanta, as well as the Gwinnett County portion of Braselton. It also serves unincorporated areas such as zip codes 30548, 30019, 30542, 30517 and 30519. Before the opening of Seckinger High school in Fall 2022, it had 3,997 students. Some of the most recent attendance counts have named it one of the largest schools in Georgia. It is fed only by Frank N. Osborne Middle School, as Glenn C. Jones Middle School now feeds into Seckinger High School.

In August 2004, Mill Creek opened with 2,538 students. It now enrolls around 3,000 students, and around 292 staff members. By 2018, the school had 3,724 students and was consistently named the largest high school in Georgia by student population.

Mill Creek was named for the fourth consecutive year as one of the schools in the top 5% in the country with regard to academics and test results.

Mill Creek has 70 student clubs.

== Newspaper ==
The Mill Creek High school newspaper has won many awards. The newspaper's original name was The Current, with the slogan, "The Current, where the news always flows." This title only lasted from the opening of Mill Creek in 2004 until 2005. Mill Creek's mascot is the Hawk, so the paper was then titled The Hawk Print. In the statewide Journalism Banquet of 2007, The Hawk Print won first place in "Best Art or Illustration," "Best Photography," "Best News Section," and "Most Improved." It is now known as the Mill Creek Chronicle.

== Notable alumni ==
- Elijah Bryant (born 1995), basketball player in the Israeli Basketball Premier League; formerly in the NBA
- Caleb Downs, NFL football player for the Dallas Cowboys
- Chris Fronzak, lead singer for the metalcore band Attila
- Luke Metz, college football linebackers for the Alabama Crimson Tide
- Daniel Pierce, baseball player
- Ryan Robinson, NFL football player
