= Charleston RiverDogs =

- Founded in 1980; Charleston, South Carolina
Team logo
Cap insignia

Minor league affiliations
- Class: Single-A (2021–present)
- Previous classes: Class A (1980–2020)
- League: Carolina League (2021–present)
- Division: South Division
- Previous leagues: South Atlantic League (1980–2020)

Major league affiliations
- Team: Tampa Bay Rays (2021–present)
- Previous teams: New York Yankees (2005–2020); Tampa Bay Devil Rays (1997–2004); Texas Rangers (1993–1996); San Diego Padres (1985–1992); Kansas City Royals (1980–1984)

Minor league titles
- League titles (3): 2021; 2022; 2023
- Division titles (8): 1980; 1988; 2005; 2008; 2021; 2022; 2023; 2026
- First-half titles (2): 1984; 2026
- Second-half titles (3): 2022; 2023; 2024

Team data
- Name: Charleston RiverDogs (1994–present); Charleston Rainbows (1985–1993); Charleston Royals (1980–1984)
- Colors: Navy blue, gold, white, gray
- Mascot: Charlie T. RiverDog and Chelsea The RiverDog
- Ballpark: Joseph P. Riley Jr. Park (1997–present)
- Previous parks: College Park (1980–1996)
- Owner(s)/ Operator(s): Goldklang Group; Peter B. Freund (minority)
- General manager: Dave Echols
- Manager: Danny Mendick
- Website: milb.com/charleston

The Charleston RiverDogs are a Minor League Baseball team of the Carolina League. They are located in Charleston, South Carolina, and are the Single-A affiliate of the Tampa Bay Rays. The RiverDogs' home stadium is Joseph P. Riley Jr. Park. Charleston is the only team in league history to win three consecutive Carolina League championships (2021, 2022, and 2023).

== History ==
=== Early success as the Royals ===
The RiverDogs were founded in 1980 as the Charleston Royals and were a farm team of the Kansas City Royals. In their first season as the Royals, they won the South Atlantic League's Southern Division championship, but fell in the playoffs against Greensboro. Like the Pirates, the Royals were known for their pitching, because in 1981 pitcher Jeffery Gladden led the league with a 2.09 ERA. In 1982 batting may have caught up with the pitching as pitcher Danny Jackson led the league with a 10–1 record and slugger Cliff Pastornicky paced the South Atlantic League with a .343 batting average. In 1983 Mark Pirruccello set a single-season team record with 25 home runs. 1984 was an exciting season for Charleston as the city hosted the all-star game in which Tom Glavine and Pat Borders played. On the field the Royals went on to win the Southern Division and Kevin Seitzer was named league MVP.

=== Rainbows era ===
In 1985, the team was renamed the Charleston Rainbows and became affiliated with the San Diego Padres. From 1985 to 1987 were the building years as the Rainbows improved each season under a great pitching staff until 1988 when they won the Southern Division title but were bounced in the first round of the playoffs. The 1988 season was powered by a pitching staff whose combined ERA equaled 2.07. 1988 was the last of the "good ol' days", because starting in 1989 the team suffered 11 consecutive losing seasons. Poor play on the field translated into a South Atlantic League record, when in 1990 pitcher Charles Thompson registered 17 losses. In 1994 the team was renamed Charleston RiverDogs after a name-the-team contest was held by the Piggly Wiggly supermarket chain. Despite the name change, the losing continued. In 1997 saw the RiverDogs leave the 84-year-old College Park and move into the brand-new 5,500-seat Joseph P. Riley Jr. Park. The team also began its eight-year affiliation with the Tampa Bay Rays in 1997. The move to the "Joe" helped to spur a rise in total attendance, as the team set a record with an increase in over 100,000 fans. In 1998, the RiverDogs were the first professional baseball team to broadcast live video on the internet, and the first team to broadcast video of their entire home season.

Finally, in 2000 the 'Dogs posted their first winning season since 1988.

=== Return to the playoffs ===
In 2003 saw the beginning of a new era as the RiverDogs played well on the field and posted a winning season for the first time since 2000. In 2004 the RiverDogs secured the wildcard spot in the playoffs bringing Charleston a playoff series for the first time in 16 years. Charleston faced the hated rival Capital City in the first round but were swept two games to none. The RiverDogs became the Class Single-A affiliate of the New York Yankees on September 15, 2004. 2005 was another great season as the Riverdogs jumped out winning the first-half Southern Division Championship qualifying them for the playoffs for the first consecutive seasons in franchise history. The 2005 playoffs weren't as good to the RiverDogs as fans had hoped, because the RiverDogs fell to eventual champion the Kannapolis Intimidators two games to none. At the end of the 2005 season, Charleston was making an attempt to attract a Class Double-A team by expanding their stadium by a few hundred seats. 2006 saw a good performance on the field, but no playoffs as the RiverDogs posted a 78–62 record. 2007 saw a record year for winning seasons when they finished the season with a 78–62 record and securing their fifth consecutive winning season tying a Charleston professional baseball record with the Sea Gulls (1914–1917, 1919) (No team in 1918). A downside to the record tying season was that the 'Dogs failed to make the playoffs for the second straight season. 2008 brought a memorable year to Charleston, as the Riverdogs recorded their final record at 80–59 bringing their sixth consecutive winning season, breaking a record for the most consecutive winning seasons (a record that stood since 1919) in Charleston baseball history. The downside to 2008 was the third straight season the Riverdogs failed to make the playoffs – despite having the best record in the Southern Division each season, they never held the division lead at the end of a half-season to claim a playoff spot. The 2009 season saw the Riverdogs finish with a winning record again. In the first half the Riverdogs came up a game short to their arch-rival Greenville Drive, who are affiliated to the Boston Red Sox and never posed as a threat in the second half failing to make the playoffs for the fourth straight year.

=== Colbrunn era ===
After posting a 232–186 record, Riverdogs manager Torre Tyson was named the Tampa Yankees manager in High A baseball. The RiverDogs were quick to name hitting coach Greg Colbrunn as the new manager for the 2010 season. With the RiverDogs on the verge of making the playoffs each of the last four seasons, expectations were high for Colbrunn.

The day following the 2015 Charleston church shooting, the RiverDogs decided to proceed with their regularly scheduled game, with Dave Echols, the team's general manager, saying: "We feel it is our duty not to let the acts of one radical human being dictate our lives". The RiverDogs donated the proceeds of the night's game to the charity set up for the Emanuel African Methodist Episcopal Church.

=== 2021 restructuring ===
On November 7, 2020, the Yankees announced that Charleston would not be part of their minor league organization under the restructuring of Minor League Baseball for 2021. Instead, they were organized into the Low-A East as the Low-A affiliate of the Tampa Bay Rays. In 2022, the Low-A East became known as the Carolina League, the name historically used by the regional circuit prior to the 2021 reorganization, and was reclassified as a Single-A circuit.

== Before the Riverdogs ==
=== Seagulls, Sea Gulls, and Gulls ===
Baseball has a long history in the Palmetto State dating back to 1862. Union soldiers from the 165th New York Infantry competed against soldiers of the 47th and 48th New York Infantries on Christmas Day 1862.

After the Civil War the game of baseball exploded in Charleston. From 1866 to 1886 the Holy City would be home to over 100 individual black and white baseball clubs.

The first organized team in Charleston was the Palmetto Baseball Club of Charleston with Mr. A.W. Wardell selected as president. The first official game took place at the Citadel Green (Marion Square) on May 23, 1866, when the club split into separate teams to play.

The Charleston Seagulls became the first professional baseball team to play in Charleston. The team was part of the newly formed Southern League and had a 22-man roster. The Seagulls first game was an exhibition game against the Louisville Colonels of the American Association on March 16, 1886. This was the first game ever to be played on their newly constructed "Ball Park Field" located at the corner of Meeting Street and Shepherd Street. The Seagulls ended up losing 5 to 7.

The first official Southern League game took place on April 15, 1886, against the 1885 Southern League Champions, the Atlanta Atlantas. The Seagulls would lose this game as well 4 to 6.

The 1886 season ended after the earthquake that occurred on August 31. The Seagulls would finish just under 50% with a 44–49 record.

| Year | Team | League | W | L | Ballpark | Final | Manager(s) | Note |
|---|---|---|---|---|---|---|---|---|
| 1886 | Seagulls | Southern League | 44 | 49 | Ball Park Field | 5th | Charlie Cushman, Jim Powell | |
| 1887 | Seagulls | Southern League | 65 | 38 | Ball Park Field | 2nd | Jim Powell | |
| 1888 | Seagulls | Southern League | 20 | 28 | Ball Park Field | 4th | Jim Powell, John Moran | |
| 1889 | Seagulls | Southern League | 26 | 19 | Ball Park Field | 2nd | Jacob Aydelott | Renamed and moved to Macon, Georgia |
| 1893 | Seagulls | Southern League | 51 | 32 | Ball Park Field | 1st | Jack Carney | |
| 1894 | Seagulls | Southern League | 33 | 22 | Ball Park Field | *** | Ollie Beard | Disbanded on June 27 |
| 1904 | Sea Gulls | South Atlantic League | 59 | 50 | Ball Park Field | 3rd | Edward Ashenbach | |
| 1905 | Sea Gulls | South Atlantic League | 53 | 70 | Hampton Park Field | 5th | James Powell, Lee DeMontreville, Peter Tibald | |
| 1906 | Sea Gulls | South Atlantic League | 48 | 61 | Hampton Park Field | 5th | Robert Pender | |
| 1907 | Sea Gulls | South Atlantic League | 75 | 46 | Hampton Park Field | 1st | Wilson Matthews, Richard Crozier | League Champions |
| 1908 | Sea Gulls | South Atlantic League | 44 | 66 | Hampton Park Field | 6th | Pat Meaney | |
| 1909 | Sea Gulls | South Atlantic League | 52 | 61 | Hampton Park Field | *** | G.S. Malarkey, Steve Griffin | Moved to Knoxville, Tennessee on July 5 |
| 1911 | Sea Gulls | South Atlantic League | 41 | 84 | Hampton Park Field | *** | Ed Ransick, Kohly Miller, Ed Sabrie, James Durham, Charlie Luskey | Disbanded on August 30, storm destroyed park |
| 1913 | Sea Gulls | South Atlantic League | 46 | 68 | College Park | 5th | George Needham, Charles Kipp, James Hamilton | |
| 1914 | Sea Gulls | South Atlantic League | 78 | 46 | College Park | 1st | James Hamilton | |
| 1915 | Sea Gulls | South Atlantic League | 51 | 36 | College Park | 2nd | Edward Reagan, Ed Sabrie, George Stinson | |
| 1916 | Sea Gulls | South Atlantic League | 68 | 55 | College Park | 2nd | James Hamilton | |
| 1917 | Sea Gulls | South Atlantic League | 47 | 20 | College Park | 1st | Robert Crowell | Lost in league finals |
| 1919 | Gulls | South Atlantic Association | 49 | 48 | College Park | 4th | Jimmy Manes | |

=== Palmettos and Pals ===
Starting in 1920, the Gulls became the Palmettos, however, later that year that name was shortened to the Pals while Charleston was promoted to "Class B". In 1922, the Pals created excitement around Charleston as they won the South Atlantic League title, but for unknown reasons the Pals folded at the end of the season, and that lead to a 16-year baseball drought in Charleston.

=== Rebels ===
Finally in 1940, a new team began play in the South Atlantic League known as the Charleston Rebels. Just two years later, in 1942, the Rebels won the South Atlantic League Championship ending a 20-year championship drought. However, the next year, the Rebels posted a losing record. 1947 started out with a bang as the Rebels were promoted to Class A and drew 184,851 fans in the season, a Charleston baseball record that stood until 1997. After all the excitement from the 1947 season, the Rebels went out and won the South Atlantic League Championship for the second time in seven years in 1948, the last time Charleston won a championship. After that memorable season, the Rebels declined and couldn't post a winning season. With fans losing interest the Rebels folded at the end of the 1953 season.

=== ChaSox and White Sox experiment with affiliation ===
In 1959, baseball returned to Charleston, but this time the team was affiliated with a Major League Baseball Team, the Chicago White Sox. The experiment failed horribly as attendance was down by more than 50% and the White Sox failed to post consecutive winning seasons.

=== New team, new league ===
In 1973, the Charleston Pirates were born, who were affiliated with the Pittsburgh Pirates, and for the first time since 1893 were playing in a league other than the South Atlantic League, they were in the Western Carolinas League. As the Pirates, Charleston excelled in pitching as in 1973 John Candelaria led the league with a 10–2 record. The following year, the Pirates pitcher Randy Sealy set a team record with a 1.97 ERA. However, after those promising years, the Pirates set a league record by losing 22 straight games. In 1976 and 1977, the Pirates became the Patriots, but the name change still had no effect on the team's play as the team failed to post a winning record and watched attendance plunge. Finally, in 1978 the Pirates left town.

== Season-by-season records ==
Note: W = Wins, L = Losses

| Season | W | L | Finish | Postseason |
|---|---|---|---|---|
| 1980 (Royals) | 78 | 61 | Southern Division Champions | WON First Round (Spartanburg), 2–0; Lost SAL Championship Series (Greensboro), 1–3 |
| 1981 (Royals) | 75 | 67 | 2nd Southern Division | Did not qualify |
| 1982 (Royals) | 74 | 66 | 2nd Southern Division | Lost First Round (Florence) 0-2 |
| 1983 (Royals) | 64 | 80 | 5th Southern Division | Did not qualify |
| 1984 (Royals) | 78 | 64 | First Half Southern Division Champions | WON First Round (Columbia), 3–1; Lost SAL Championship Series (Asheville), 2–3 |
| 1985 (Rainbows) | 78 | 61 | 3rd Southern Division | Did not qualify |
| 1986 (Rainbows) | 63 | 69 | 3rd Southern Division | Did not qualify |
| 1987 (Rainbows) | 68 | 71 | 5th Southern Division | Did not qualify |
| 1988 (Rainbows) | 85 | 53 | Southern Division Champions | WON First Round (Myrtle Beach), 3–1; Lost SAL Championship Series (Spartanburg), 0–3 |
| 1989 (Rainbows) | 72 | 68 | 3rd Southern Division | Lost First Round (Augusta), 0–3 |
| 1990 (Rainbows) | 46 | 96 | 6th Southern Division | Did not qualify |
| 1991 (Rainbows) | 69 | 72 | 4th Southern Division | Did not qualify |
| 1992 (Rainbows) | 55 | 85 | 7th Southern Division | Did not qualify |
| 1993 (Rainbows) | 65 | 77 | 5th Southern Division | Did not qualify |
| 1994 (RiverDogs) | 56 | 81 | 6th Southern Division | Did not qualify |
| 1995 (RiverDogs) | 50 | 89 | 7th Southern Division | Did not qualify |
| 1996 (RiverDogs) | 63 | 78 | 4th Central Division | Did not qualify |
| 1997 (RiverDogs) | 60 | 82 | 6th Central Division | Did not qualify |
| 1998 (RiverDogs) | 67 | 74 | 5th Central Division | Did not qualify |
| 1999 (RiverDogs) | 65 | 77 | 5th Central Division | Did not qualify |
| 2000 (RiverDogs) | 73 | 66 | 3rd Central Division | Did not qualify |
| 2001 (RiverDogs) | 64 | 76 | 7th Southern Division | Did not qualify |
| 2002 (RiverDogs) | 60 | 76 | 7th Southern Division | Did not qualify |
| 2003 (RiverDogs) | 77 | 62 | 3rd Southern Division | Did not qualify |
| 2004 (RiverDogs) | 76 | 63 | 2nd Southern Division | Lost First Round (Capital City), 0–2 |
| 2005 (RiverDogs) | 80 | 58 | Southern Division Champions | Lost First Round (Kannapolis), 0–2 |
| 2006 (RiverDogs) | 78 | 62 | 2nd Southern Division | Did not qualify |
| 2007 (RiverDogs) | 78 | 62 | 4th Southern Division | Did not qualify |
| 2008 (RiverDogs) | 80 | 59 | Southern Division Champions | Did not qualify (Were not leading division at the end of each half season) |
| 2009 (RiverDogs) | 74 | 65 | 2nd Southern Division | Did not qualify |
| 2010 (RiverDogs) | 65 | 74 | 6th Southern Division | Did not qualify |
| 2011 (RiverDogs) | 55 | 85 | 6th Southern Division | Did not qualify |
| 2012 (RiverDogs) | 76 | 63 | 2nd Southern Division | Did not qualify |
| 2013 (RiverDogs) | 75 | 63 | 3rd Southern Division | Did not qualify |
| 2014 (RiverDogs) | 71 | 69 | 3rd Southern Division | Did not qualify |
| 2015 (RiverDogs) | 66 | 74 | 4th Southern Division | Did not qualify |
| 2016 (RiverDogs) | 76 | 63 | 2nd Southern Division | Lost First Round (Rome), 1–2 |
| 2017 (RiverDogs) | 76 | 63 | 2nd Southern Division | Lost First Round (Greenville), 1–2 |
| 2018 (RiverDogs) | 64 | 72 | 5th Southern Division | Did not qualify |
| 2019 (RiverDogs) | 73 | 66 | 2nd Southern Division | Did not qualify |
| 2021 (RiverDogs) | 82 | 38 | Southern Division Champions | Won Finals (Down East), 3–2 |
| 2022 (RiverDogs) | 88 | 44 | Southern Division Champions | Won Finals (Bank of the James Stadium, Lynchburg, Virginia), 2–0 |
| 2023 (RiverDogs) | 66 | 65 | Southern Division Champions | Won Finals (Grainger Stadium, Kinston, North Carolina), 2–0 |
| 2024 (RiverDogs) | 69 | 61 | 2nd Southern Division | Lost First Round (Kannapolis), 1–2 |
| 2025 (RiverDogs) | 68 | 62 | 2nd Southern Division | Did not qualify |
| Overall (Regular Season) | 3113 | 3107 | | |
| Overall (Playoffs) | 25 | 29 | | |
| Overall | 3138 | 3136 | | |

== Roster ==
Charleston RiverDogs roster
| Players | Coaches/Other |
|---|---|
| Pitchers: 18 Aidan Cremarosa; 26 Cesar De Jesus; 34 Aidan Haugh; 13 Jordi Infante; 15 Luke Jackson; 26 Brayden Jones; 22 Jacob Kuhn; 27 Dylan Lesko ~; 30 Xavier Lopez; 8 Trendan Parish; 30 Jeremy Pilon; 29 Efrailin Ramos; 16 Bryce Shaffer; 39 Riley Stanford; 31 Ethan Storm; 4 Yereny Teus; 23 Miguel Toscano; 35 Alex Wallace; Catchers: 28 Brody Donay; 5 Yirer Garcia; 17 J.D. Gonzalez; 32 Taitn Gray; 26 Andres Torres; Infielders: 25 Andreimi Antunez; 21 Grady Emerson; 11 Cooper Flemming; 19 Jack Lines; 20 Alberth Palma; Outfielders: 2 Slater de Brun; 25 Brailer Guerrero; 36 Angel Mateo; 40 Dean Moss; 7 Tom Poole | Manager: 6 Danny Mendick; Coaches: 37 Tyler Higgins (pitching); 3 Francisco Leandro (bench); 10 Kevin Randel (coach); 24 Paul Rozelle (hitting); 60-day injured list: 2 Derek Datil (full season); -- Steven Gonzalez (full season); -- Danny Hilario (full season); -- Brady Jones; -- Marbin Lezcano (full season); 15 Eric Lin (full season); 32 Brady Marget; 33 Alvaro Mejias; 33 Trace Phillips; 7 Daniel Pierce; -- James Quinn-Irons; 7-day injured list; * On Tampa Bay Rays 40-man roster; ~ Development list; # Rehab assignment; ∞ Reserve list; ‡ Restricted list; § Suspended list; † Temporarily inactive list; Roster updated September 3, 2026; Transactions; → More rosters: MiLB • Carolina League; → Tampa Bay Rays minor league players |

== Notable players ==
A number of ex-RiverDogs have gone on to make a name for themselves in Major League Baseball, including: B. J. Upton, Carl Crawford, Rocco Baldelli, Delmon Young, Seth McClung, Josh Hamilton, Toby Hall, Aubrey Huff, Aaron Judge, Danny Burawa, Phil Hughes, David Robertson, Gary Sánchez, Austin Jackson, John Axford, Phil Coke, Eduardo Núñez and Fernando Tatís who all played for the RiverDogs; Sandy Alomar Jr., Roberto Alomar, Carlos Baerga, Homer Bush, Joey Hamilton, and Rich Loiselle, who played for the Rainbows; and David Cone and Danny Jackson who played for the Charleston Royals.

Notable players who have worn the Charleston uniform prior to the current incarnation of the franchise include Baseball Hall of Famer Kiki Cuyler as well as Maurice "Flash" Archdeacon, John Candelaria, Larry Cheney; Dave Dravecky, Steve Farr, Sam Hairston, Odell Jones, Junior Ortiz, Tony Pena, Pascual Perez, George Pipgras, Don Robinson, Willie Randolph, Rip Sewell, Frank Thomas, Al Weis, and Ed Whitson.
