= Caleb Downs =

American football player (born 2004)

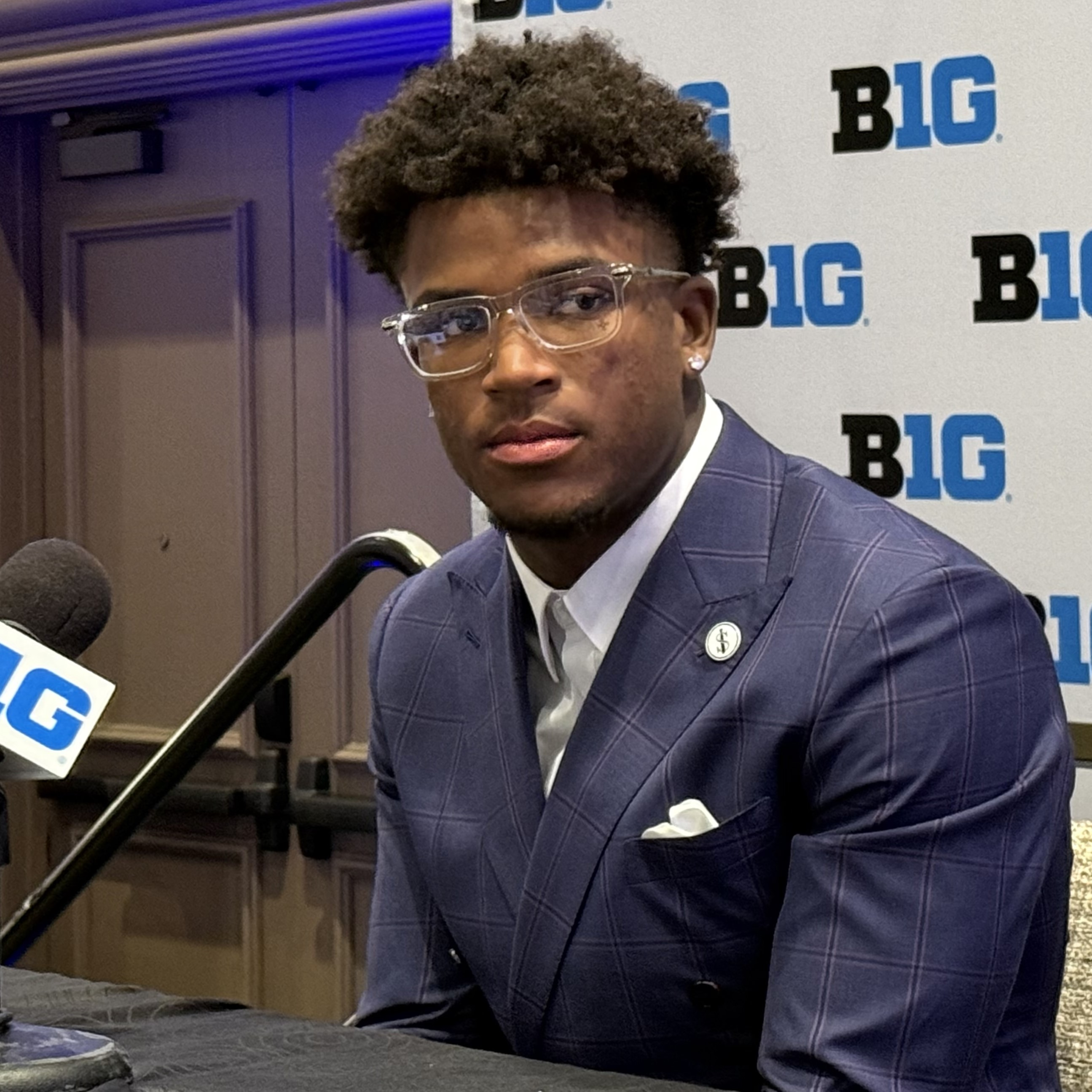
- Downs in 2025

No. 13 – Dallas Cowboys
- Position: Safety
- Roster status: Active

Personal information
- Born: December 10, 2004 (age 21); Suwanee, Georgia
- Listed height: 6 ft 0 in (1.83 m)
- Listed weight: 210 lb (95 kg)

Career information
- High school: Mill Creek (Hoschton, Georgia)
- College: Alabama (2023); Ohio State (2024–2025)
- NFL draft: 2026: 1st round, 11th overall pick

Career history
- Dallas Cowboys (2026–present)

Awards and highlights
- CFP national champion (2024); Lott Trophy (2025); Jim Thorpe Award (2025); 2× Unanimous All-American (2024, 2025); Second-team All-American (2023); Shaun Alexander Freshman of the Year (2023); Big Ten Defensive Player of the Year (2025); SEC Freshman of the Year (2023)

Career NFL statistics as of Week 10, 2026
- Tackles: 66
- Sacks: 2.0
- Forced fumbles: 2
- Pass deflections: 3
- Interceptions: 1
- Stats at Pro Football Reference

Caleb Downs (born December 10, 2004) is an American professional football safety for the Dallas Cowboys of the National Football League (NFL). Downs played college football for the Alabama Crimson Tide and Ohio State Buckeyes. With Ohio State, he won the 2024 national championship and was the recipient of the 2025 Lott Trophy and Jim Thorpe Award. Downs was selected by the Cowboys in the first round of the 2026 NFL draft. He is the son of former football player Gary Downs and younger brother of wide receiver Josh Downs.

== Early life ==
Downs was born on December 10, 2004. He attended Mill Creek High School in his home town of Hoschton, Georgia, where he was a standout Football, Basketball and Baseball athlete. Downs was named the All-American Bowl Player of the Year as a senior. He was ranked as one of the top players in the 2023 college football recruiting class and considered the nation's No. 1 safety prospect. He was ranked No. 9 nationally by Rivals.com, No. 11 by ESPN and No. 8 by 247Sports. Downs was named the 2023 USA Today Defensive Football Player of the Year.

== College career ==
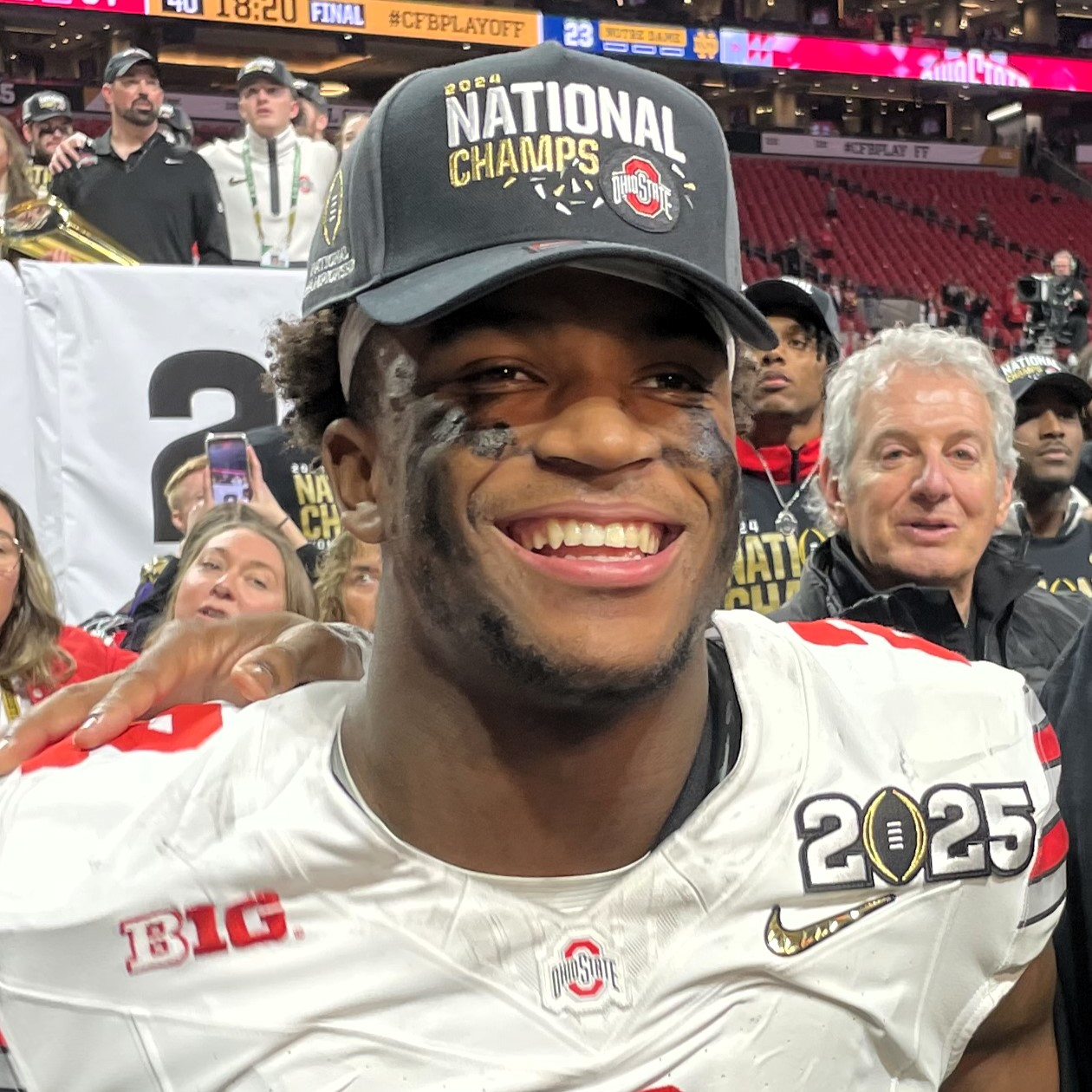
Downs with the Ohio State Buckeyes following their 2024 national championship

Downs committed to Alabama on July 27, 2022. He chose Alabama over Clemson, Georgia, Notre Dame and Ohio State. In his debut, he led the team in tackles with eight. At the conclusion of his freshman season Downs was named the SEC Freshman of the Year. Following the retirement of Nick Saban, he transferred to Ohio State. In Ohio State's 38–15 win over No. 5 Indiana, Downs returned a punt 79 yards for a touchdown. At the conclusion of the 2024 season Downs was named a unanimous All-American. On January 7, 2026, he declared for the 2026 NFL draft.

Off the field, Downs has been noted as one of the most prominent athletes in the "Name, Image, and Likeness" (NIL) era. He has secured several major endorsement deals, including a partnership with activewear brand Rhoback and an exclusive deal with trading card company Panini America.

== Professional career ==
Pre-draft measurables
Height	Weight	Arm length	Hand span	Wingspan
5 ft 11 5/8 in (1.82 m)	206 lb (93 kg)	30 1/4 in (0.77 m)	9 1/2 in (0.24 m)	6 ft 1 1/4 in (1.86 m)
All values from NFL Combine

Downs was selected by the Dallas Cowboys in the first round, with the 11th overall pick, of the 2026 NFL draft. On May 1, 2026, he signed a four-year, $28.9 million contract with the Cowboys that included a $17.5 million signing bonus.

== Career statistics ==
=== College ===
Legend
**Bold**	Career high

Year	Team	GP	Tackles					Interceptions					Fumbles		
Year	Team	GP	Cmb	Solo	Ast	TFL	Sck	Int	Yds	Avg	TD	PD	FF	FR	TD
2023	Alabama	14	**107**	**70**	**37**	3.5	0.0	**2**	**11**	**5.5**	0	4	1	**1**	0
2024	Ohio State	16	82	49	33	**7.5**	0.5	**2**	7	3.5	0	**6**	0	0	0
2025	Ohio State	14	68	45	23	5.0	**1.0**	**2**	0	0.0	0	2	**2**	0	0
Career		44	257	164	93	16.0	1.5	6	18	3.0	0	12	3	1	0

== Personal life ==
Downs' father, Gary, played college football for NC State and for seven years in the National Football League as a running back. Gary is now a representative for Fellowship of Christian Athletes and coaches. His uncle, Dré Bly, played for the North Carolina Tar Heels and also played 11 years in the NFL. Caleb's brother, Josh, also played with the Tar Heels, and is currently a wide receiver for the Kansas City Chiefs of the NFL.

Downs is a Christian. He has said, "Everything I’ve been able to achieve starts with my faith. I’m grateful to God for the direction, strength, and purpose He’s given me. And I will continue to glorify, honor, and praise Him throughout this journey."
