= Gary Downs =

American football player and coach (born 1972)

No. 34, 45
- Position: Running back

Personal information
- Born: June 6, 1972 (age 54); New Bern, North Carolina, U.S.
- Listed height: 6 ft 1 in (1.85 m)
- Listed weight: 210 lb (95 kg)

Career information
- High school: Spencer (Columbus, Georgia)
- College: NC State
- NFL draft: 1994: 3rd round, 95th overall pick

Career history

Playing
- New York Giants (1994); Denver Broncos (1995); New York Giants (1996); Atlanta Falcons (1997–2000)

Coaching
- Riverside Military Academy (GA) (2003) Running backs coach; Riverside Military Academy (GA) (2004–2006) Offensive coordinator; Amsterdam Admirals (2007) Running backs coach; Mount Pisgah Christian School (GA) (2007–2011) Offensive coordinator; Riverside Military Academy (GA) (2012–2014) Head coach; East Tennessee State (2015–2017) Running backs coach; East Tennessee State (2018–2021) Running backs coach & recruiting coordinator

Career NFL statistics
- Rushing yards: 149
- Rushing average: 3.3
- Receptions: 9
- Receiving yards: 66
- Stats at Pro Football Reference

Gary McClinton Downs Jr. (born June 6, 1972) is an American former professional football running back and coach who played for the NFL's New York Giants, Denver Broncos, and Atlanta Falcons. He was also an assistant coach for NFL Europa's Amsterdam Admirals. He is the father of football players Josh and Caleb Downs.

== Career ==
Pre-draft measurables
Height	Weight	Arm length	Hand span	40-yard dash	10-yard split	20-yard split	20-yard shuttle	Vertical jump
5 ft 11 7/8 in (1.83 m)	212 lb (96 kg)	31 1/4 in (0.79 m)	9 3/8 in (0.24 m)	4.61 s	1.62 s	2.64 s	4.28 s	33.0 in (0.84 m)

Downs played college football at North Carolina State University and was selected 95th overall in the third round of the 1994 NFL draft by the Giants. He played in 69 games over six NFL seasons from 1994 to 2000. He rushed for 149 yards and caught nine passes for 66 yards.

== Personal life ==
Gary Downs’ spouse is Tanya Shorter Downs from Cary N.C. They have three children, including a daughter Kameron and sons Josh and Caleb. Kameron played women's soccer for Kennesaw State University before attending medical school at Wake Forest University. Josh was a wide receiver for North Carolina. and was selected by the Indianapolis Colts in the third round, 79th overall, of the 2023 NFL draft. Caleb was a 5-star recruit who played his freshman season as safety at the University of Alabama, followed by two seasons at Ohio State University and was selected by the Dallas Cowboys 11th overall in the 2026 NFL draft.

== Sources ==
- NFL Europa profile
- Gary Downs stats at databasefootball.com
