= Deacon Hill (American football) =

American football player (born 2003)

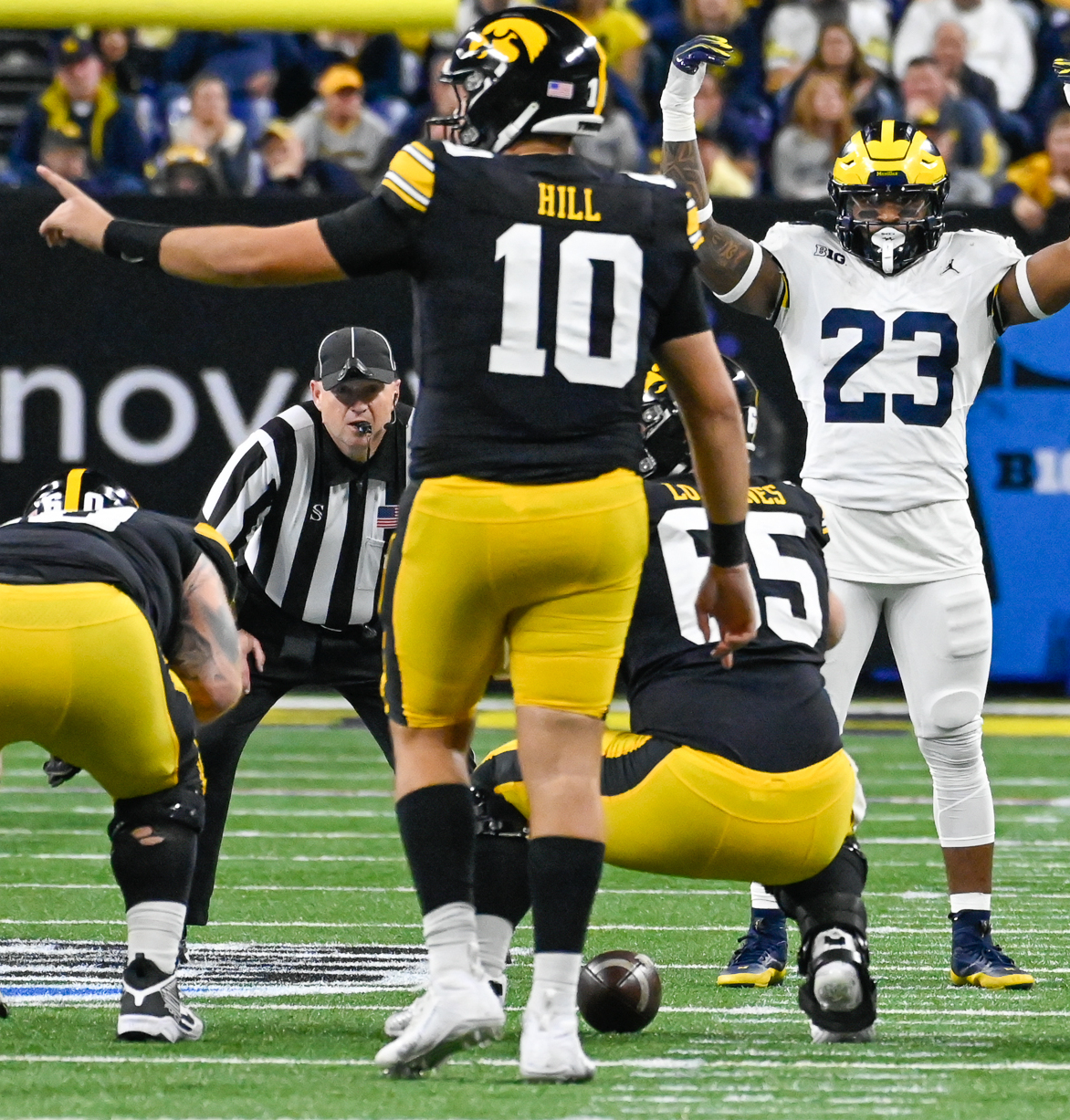
- Hill playing for Iowa against Michigan in the 2023 Big Ten Football Championship Game.

No. 10 – Utah Tech Trailblazers
- Position: Quarterback
- Class: (redshirt) Senior

Personal information
- Born: February 11, 2003 (age 23); Santa Barbara, California, U.S.
- Listed height: 6 ft 4 in (1.93 m)
- Listed weight: 247 lb (112 kg)

Career information
- High school: Santa Barbara (Santa Barbara, California)
- College: Wisconsin (2020–2022); Iowa (2023); Utah Tech (2024–present)
- Stats at ESPN

Deacon Hill (born February 11, 2003) is an American college football quarterback for the Utah Tech Trailblazers. He previously played for the Wisconsin Badgers and Iowa Hawkeyes.

== Early life ==
Hill attended Santa Barbara High School in Santa Barbara, California, where he lettered in football and basketball. He was rated a four-star recruit by Rivals and a three-star recruit by 247Sports and ESPN. Hill committed to play college football for Wisconsin over offers from Kansas State, Nevada and UCLA.

== College career ==
=== Wisconsin ===
Hill did not play during his freshman season at the University of Wisconsin–Madison in 2020 and was redshirted in 2021. In 2022, he played in only one game where he did not complete any passes.

On October 9, 2022, Hill announced that he would be entering the transfer portal. On December 25, 2022, he announced that he would be transferring to Fordham, but on January 4, 2023, he announced that he would instead be transferring to Iowa.

=== Iowa ===
Following a season-ending injury to starting quarterback Cade McNamara early in the 2023 season, Hill assumed the starting role for the Iowa Hawkeyes. He started eight of the team’s thirteen games and posted a 6–2 record in those starts. Hill completed 122 of 251 passes for 1,152 yards, with five touchdowns and eight interceptions.

Although Iowa’s offense ranked near the bottom nationally in total offense and scoring, Hill was noted by sportswriters for his composure and resilience while leading the team through several close, low-scoring games.

Under his leadership, the Hawkeyes finished the regular season 10–2 and advanced to the Big Ten Championship Game.

After spring practices in April 2024, Hill announced he would once again enter the transfer portal.

=== Utah Tech ===
On May 18, 2024, Hill announced that he committed to Utah Tech.

=== Statistics ===
Year	Team	Games			Passing								Rushing			
Year	Team	GP	GS	Record	Cmp	Att	Pct	Yds	Y/A	TD	Int	Rtg	Att	Yds	Avg	TD
2020	Wisconsin	0	0	—	Redshirted (redshirt)											
2021	Wisconsin	0	0	—	DNP											
2022	Wisconsin	1	0	—	0	0	0.0	0	0.0	0	0	0.0	1	-10	-10.0	0
2023	Iowa	13	9	6−3	122	251	48.6	1,152	4.6	5	8	87.4	50	-126	-2.5	2
2024	Utah Tech	4	4	0−4	36	75	48.5	412	5.5	2	1	100.3	10	5	0.5	1
2025	Utah Tech	0	0	—	Did not play due to injury											
2026	Utah Tech	4	3	1–2	38	75	50.7	511	6.8	2	1	114.0	20	75	3.8	2
Career		22	16	7–9	196	401	48.9	2,075	5.2	9	10	94.8	81	-44	-0.5	5
