= 2023 Big Ten Football Championship Game =

- Conference Championship
Michigan Wolverines	Iowa Hawkeyes
(12–0)	(10–2)
26	0
Head coach: Jim Harbaugh	Head coach: Kirk Ferentz
AP / Coaches / CFP; 2 / 2 / 2	AP / Coaches / CFP; 18 / 17 / 16
	1	2	3	4	Total
Michigan	10	0	10	6	26
Iowa	0	0	0	0	0
- Date: December 2, 2023
- Season: 2023
- Stadium: Lucas Oil Stadium
- Location: Indianapolis, Indiana
- MVP: Mike Sainristil, DB, Michigan
- Favorite: Michigan by 22.5
- National anthem: Hawkeye Marching Band & Michigan Marching Band
- Referee: Jeff Servinski
- Halftime show: Hawkeye Marching Band & Michigan Marching Band
- Attendance: 67,842

United States TV coverage
- Network: Fox; Compass Media
- Announcers: Gus Johnson (play-by-play), Joel Klatt (analyst) and Jenny Taft (sideline) (Fox); Gregg Daniels (play-by-play) and Chad Brown (analyst) (Compass Media)

2023 Big Ten Conference football standings
	Conf.			Overall
Team	W		L	W		L
East Division
No. 1 Michigan xy$#^	9	–	0	15	–	0
No. 10 Ohio State	8	–	1	11	–	2
No. 13 Penn State	7	–	2	10	–	3
Maryland	4	–	5	8	–	5
Rutgers	3	–	6	7	–	6
Indiana	1	–	8	3	–	9
Michigan State†	0	–	7	0	–	8
West Division
No. 24 Iowa xy	7	–	2	10	–	4
Northwestern	5	–	4	8	–	5
Wisconsin	5	–	4	7	–	6
Minnesota	3	–	6	6	–	7
Illinois	3	–	6	5	–	7
Nebraska	3	–	6	5	–	7
Purdue	3	–	6	4	–	8
Championship: Michigan 26, Iowa 0
# – College Football Playoff champion; ^ – College Football Playoff participant; $ – Conference champion; x – Division champion/co-champions; y – Championship game participant; † — NCAA vacated all wins for Michigan State (4–8, 2–7); Rankings from AP Poll

The 2023 Big Ten Football Championship Game was a college football game played on December 2, 2023, at Lucas Oil Stadium in Indianapolis, Indiana. It was the 13th edition of the Big Ten Football Championship Game and determined the champion of the conference for the 2023 season. The game began at 8:17 p.m. EST and aired on Fox, featuring the West Division champion Iowa Hawkeyes and the East Division champion Michigan Wolverines. Michigan won 26–0 to secure their third consecutive outright Big Ten title. Head coach Jim Harbaugh became the first Big Ten coach to achieve that feat. The division era ended with the East Division going 10–0 in title games since the East-West format change in 2014.

== Teams ==
The 2023 Big Ten Championship Game featured the Iowa Hawkeyes, champions of the West Division, and the Michigan Wolverines, champions of the East Division. This was the third Big Ten title game appearance for both programs, The Hawkeyes were 0–2 in previous appearances, having most recently lost to Michigan in 2021. The Wolverines were 2–0 in previous appearances, having also defeated Purdue in 2022.

=== Michigan Wolverines ===
Michigan entered the game at 12–0 (9–0 BIG) and was designated as the visiting team. Heading into the final week of the regular season, Michigan and Ohio State both had undefeated conference records at 8–0 going into the 2023 edition of The Game in Ann Arbor, thus making the game a de facto East division championship. The Wolverines won the game 30–24, and clinched the division title for the third consecutive season. A win would mean a third consecutive appearance in the College Football Playoff the Wolverines.

=== Iowa Hawkeyes ===
Iowa entered the game at 10–2 (7–2 BIG) and was designated as the home team. The Hawkeyes clinched a spot in the game following their 15–13 win over Illinois on November 18. They have not won the Big Ten since 2004 or outright since 1985. Iowa also hasn't defeated Michigan since 2016, going 0–3 since a 14–13 walk-off over the No. 2 Wolverines at Kinnick Stadium. They entered the game a 22.5-point underdog.

== Game summary ==
2023 Big 10 Championship Game
No. 2 Michigan Wolverines (12–0, 9–0) vs. No. 16 Iowa Hawkeyes (10–2, 7–2)

Quarter	1	2	3	4	Total
No. 2 Michigan	10	0	10	6	26
No. 16 Iowa	0	0	0	0	0

at Lucas Oil Stadium • Indianapolis, IN

- Date: Saturday, December 2, 2023
- Game time: 8:17 p.m. EST
- Game weather: Indoors
- Game attendance: 67,842
- Referee: Jeff Servinski
- TV announcers (FOX): Gus Johnson (play-by-play), Joel Klatt (analyst), Jenny Taft (sideline)

Game information

First quarter

- (6:01) MICH - James Turner 35-yard field goal – 13 plays, 52 yards, 7:35 (Michigan 3–0)
- (1:07) MICH - Blake Corum 2-yard run (James Turner Kick) – 2 plays, 5 yards, 0:39 (Michigan 10–0)

Third quarter

- (9:09) MICH - Blake Corum 6-yard run (James Turner Kick) – 1 play, 6 yards, 0:05 (Michigan 17–0)
- (0:22) MICH - James Turner 46-yard field goal – 9 plays, 28 yards, 4:46 (Michigan 20–0)

Fourth quarter

- (9:14) MICH - James Turner 36-yard field goal – 4 plays, –3 yards, 1:43 (Michigan 23–0)
- (3:38) MICH - James Turner 50-yard field goal – 6 plays, 23 yards, 3:46 (Michigan 26–0)

Statistics	MICH	IOWA
First downs	13	7
Plays–yards	64–213	56–155
Rushes–yards	66	35
Passing yards	147	120
Passing: comp–att–int	22–30–0	18–32–0
Time of possession	36:32	23:28

Team	Category	Player	Statistics
Michigan	Passing	J. J. McCarthy	22/30, 147 yards
Michigan	Rushing	Blake Corum	16 carries, 52 yards, 2 TD
Michigan	Receiving	Cornelius Johnson	9 receptions, 64 yards
Iowa	Passing	Deacon Hill	18/32, 120 yards
Iowa	Rushing	Leshon Williams	9 carries, 25 yards
Iowa	Receiving	Addison Ostrenga	7 receptions, 50 yards

== See also ==
- List of Big Ten Conference football champions
