= Kaleb Brown =

American football player (born 2003)

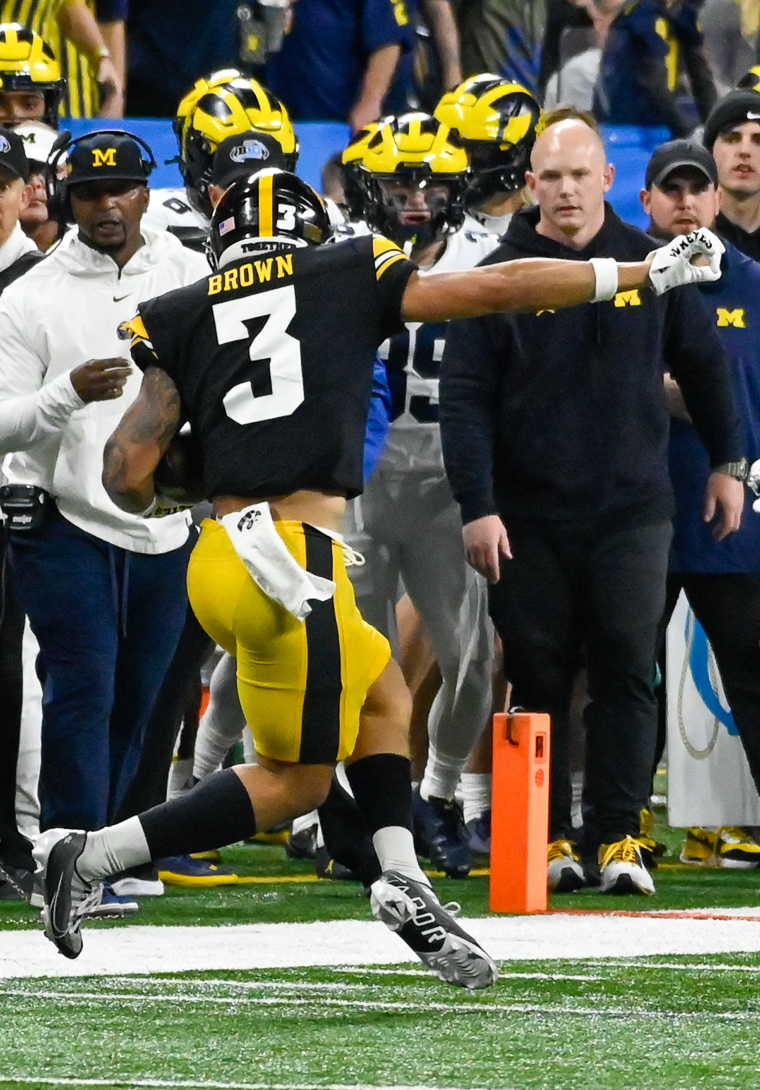

No. 8 – UAB Blazers
- Position: Wide receiver
- Class: Redshirt Senior

Personal information
- Born: October 7, 2003 (age 23)
- Listed height: 5 ft 10 in (1.78 m)
- Listed weight: 200 lb (91 kg)

Career information
- High school: St. Rita of Cascia (Chicago, Illinois)
- College: Ohio State (2022); Iowa (2023–2024); UAB (2025–present)
- Stats at ESPN

Kaleb Brown (born October 7, 2003) is an American college football wide receiver for the UAB Blazers. He previously played for the Ohio State Buckeyes and the Iowa Hawkeyes.

== Early life ==
Brown attended St. Rita of Cascia High School in Chicago. As a junior, he hauled in eight receptions for 125 yards and a touchdown. Brown suffered an injury in the first game of his senior year which sidelined him for most of the season. He was invited to participate in the 2022 All-American Bowl. Coming out of high school, Brown was rated as a four-star recruit, the No. six wide receiver, and the No. 63 overall player in the class of 2022, and committed to play college football for the Ohio State Buckeyes over Michigan.

== College career ==
=== Ohio State ===
As a freshman in 2022, Brown appeared in five games, recording one reception for five yards against Iowa. After the season, he entered his name into the NCAA transfer portal.

=== Iowa ===
Brown transferred to play for the Iowa Hawkeyes. In week 10 of the 2023 season, he hauled in a 23-yard reception to set up a game-winning field goal over Northwestern. The following week, Brown scored his first career touchdown versus Rutgers. In week 12, he led the Hawkeyes with seven receptions for 71 yards in a win over Illinois. Brown finished the 2023 season with 22 receptions for 215 yards and one touchdown, while also adding 54 yards on the ground.

On October 7, 2024, Brown announced that he would redshirt for the season and enter the transfer portal. He spent the 2024 season playing in three games and only 19 snaps and catching one pass for 18 yards against Troy.

=== UAB ===
On December 17, 2024, Brown announced that he would transfer to UAB.
