= McCallan Castles =

American football player (born 1999)

Louisville Kings
- Position: Tight end
- Roster status: Unsigned draft pick

Personal information
- Born: December 3, 1999 (age 26); South Lake Tahoe, California, U.S.
- Listed height: 6 ft 4 in (1.93 m)
- Listed weight: 244 lb (111 kg)

Career information
- High school: South Tahoe (South Lake Tahoe)
- College: California (2018–2019); UC Davis (2020–2022); Tennessee (2023)
- NFL draft: 2024: undrafted

Career history
- Philadelphia Eagles (2024)*; Los Angeles Chargers (2024–2025)*; Los Angeles Rams (2025)*; Green Bay Packers (2025–2026)*; Louisville Kings (2027-present)
- * Offseason or practice squad member only

Awards and highlights
- First-team All-Big Sky (2020); 2× Second-team All-Big Sky (2021, 2022)
- Stats at Pro Football Reference

McCallan Verona Castles (born December 3, 1999) is an American professional football tight end. He played college football for the California Golden Bears, UC Davis Aggies, and Tennessee Volunteers.

== Early life ==
Castles initially grew up in Berthoud, Colorado and attended Berthoud High School. He moved with his family to South Lake Tahoe, California after his sophomore year of high school and transferred to South Tahoe High School. Castles caught 102 passes for 2,027 yards and 27 touchdowns in two seasons at South Tahoe.

== College career ==
Castles began his college football career with the California Golden Bears. He played in three games during his true freshman season while maintaining a redshirt on the year and caught one pass, which was a 15-yard reception in Cal's 10-7 win over TCU in the 2018 Cheez-It Bowl. Castles left the team two games into his sophomore season. He later entered the NCAA transfer portal.

Castles ultimately transferred to UC Davis. He was named first-team All-Big Sky Conference after catching 12 passes for 194 yards and three touchdowns in his first season playing for the Aggies, which was shortened and played in the spring of 2021 due to the COVID-19 pandemic in the United States. Castles was named second-team All-Big Sky after recording 27 receptions for 387 yards and four touchdowns. Castles had 30 catches for 347 yards and two touchdowns in his redshirt senior season. After the season, he entered the NCAA transfer portal and utilize the extra year of eligibility granted to college athletes who played in the 2020 season due to the coronavirus pandemic.

Castles committed to transfer to Tennessee. In the 2023 season, Castles played in all 13 games. He had 22 receptions for 283 receiving yards and five receiving touchdowns.

== Professional career ==
Pre-draft measurables
Height	Weight	Arm length	Hand span	Wingspan	40-yard dash	10-yard split	20-yard split	20-yard shuttle	Three-cone drill	Vertical jump	Broad jump	Bench press
6 ft 4 3/8 in (1.94 m)	244 lb (111 kg)	33 in (0.84 m)	9 7/8 in (0.25 m)	6 ft 7 1/8 in (2.01 m)	4.68 s	1.66 s	2.57 s	4.36 s	7.21 s	37.5 in (0.95 m)	10 ft 6 in (3.20 m)	16 reps
All values from Pro Day

=== Philadelphia Eagles ===
Castles was signed by the Philadelphia Eagles as an undrafted free agent on May 3, 2024. He was also selected by the Memphis Showboats in the ninth round of the 2024 UFL draft on July 17. McCallan was waived with an injury designation on August 3.

=== Los Angeles Chargers ===
On October 15, 2024, Castles signed with the Los Angeles Chargers' practice squad. He signed a reserve/future contract with Los Angeles on January 13, 2025. On August 6, Castles was waived by the Chargers.

=== Los Angeles Rams ===
On August 11, 2025, Castles signed with the Los Angeles Rams. He was waived by the Rams on August 24.

=== Green Bay Packers ===
On November 4, 2025, Castles signed with the Green Bay Packers' practice squad. He was placed on the practice squad's injured reserve list on January 1, 2026. Castles signed a reserve/future contract with Green Bay on January 12.

On April 17, 2026, Castles was released by the Packers. He was re–signed by the Packers again on August 4. On August 30, Castles was waived by the Packers with an injury designation as a part of final roster cuts.
