= Thousand Oaks shooting =

2018 mass shooting in California, U.S.

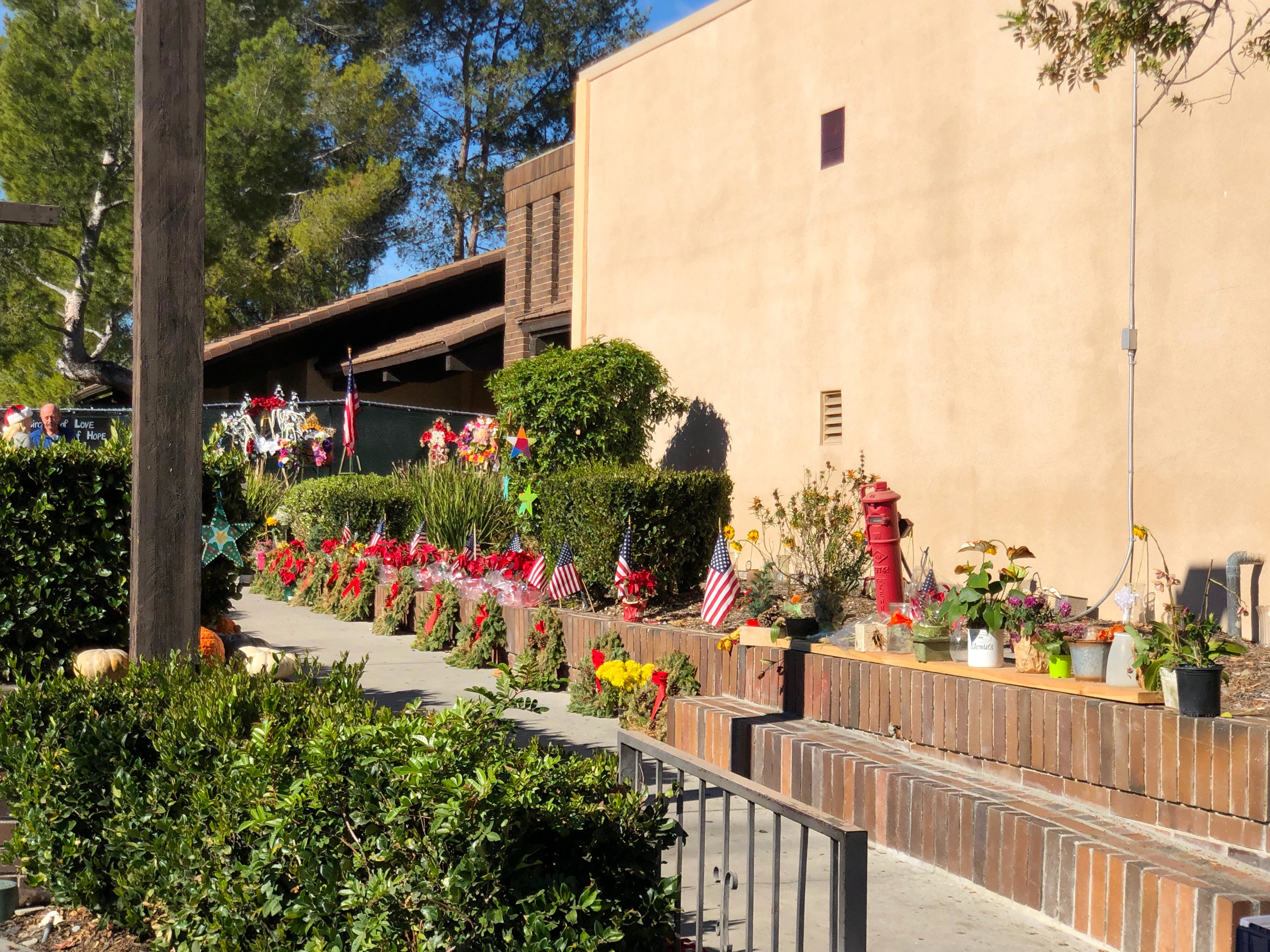
- Flowers outside Borderline Bar and Grill

- Thousand Oaks (southern California)
- Location: 34°10′36″N 118°52′29″W; Borderline Bar and Grill; 99 Rolling Oaks Drive; Thousand Oaks, California, U.S.
- Date: November 7, 2018; 8 years ago 11:18 – 11:38 p.m. (PST; UTC−8)
- Attack type: Mass shooting; mass murder; murder-suicide; shootout
- Weapons: .45-caliber Glock 21SF semi-automatic pistol; Folding knife; Smoke bomb
- Deaths: 13 (including the perpetrator and 1 by stray police gunfire)
- Injuries: 16 (1 by gunfire)
- Perpetrator: Ian David Long

On November 7, 2018, a mass shooting occurred in Thousand Oaks, California, United States, at the Borderline Bar and Grill, a country-western bar frequented by college students. Thirteen people were killed, including the perpetrator, who died of a self-inflicted gunshot wound, and a police officer who was shot multiple times, with the fatal round accidentally being fired by another officer. One other person sustained a gunshot wound, while fifteen others were injured by incidental causes.

Police identified the gunman as 28-year-old Ian David Long, a United States Marine Corps veteran.

== Events ==
At 11:18 p.m., a gunman, later identified as Ian David Long, entered the Borderline Bar and Grill and opened fire on the approximately 260 patrons and employees inside. At the time, the bar was hosting a regularly scheduled College Country Night event, which was popular among students in the area, especially those from Pepperdine University, California Lutheran University, California State University Channel Islands, and Moorpark College. Long was armed with a legally purchased .45-caliber Glock 21 semi-automatic pistol with a Viridian X5L tactical weapon light and laser sight and seven banned high-capacity magazines, carrying a total of 190 rounds, along with a folding knife, ten smoke bombs, and two fireworks.

Upon entering through the bar's front door, Long first killed the cashier nearby, then started shooting at the patrons. He fired a total of 61 rounds and threw smoke bombs. Many of the victims died in the first few minutes of the shooting while they were lying on the floor or trying to charge at Long. Witnesses described the gunman as a heavily tattooed white male dressed entirely in black. Some people shattered the bar's windows, allowing many to flee, while some others hid in an employee bathroom or the attic. During the shooting, Long answered a phone call made by the mother of a patron who escaped, and he also made several posts on Instagram expressing his thoughts.

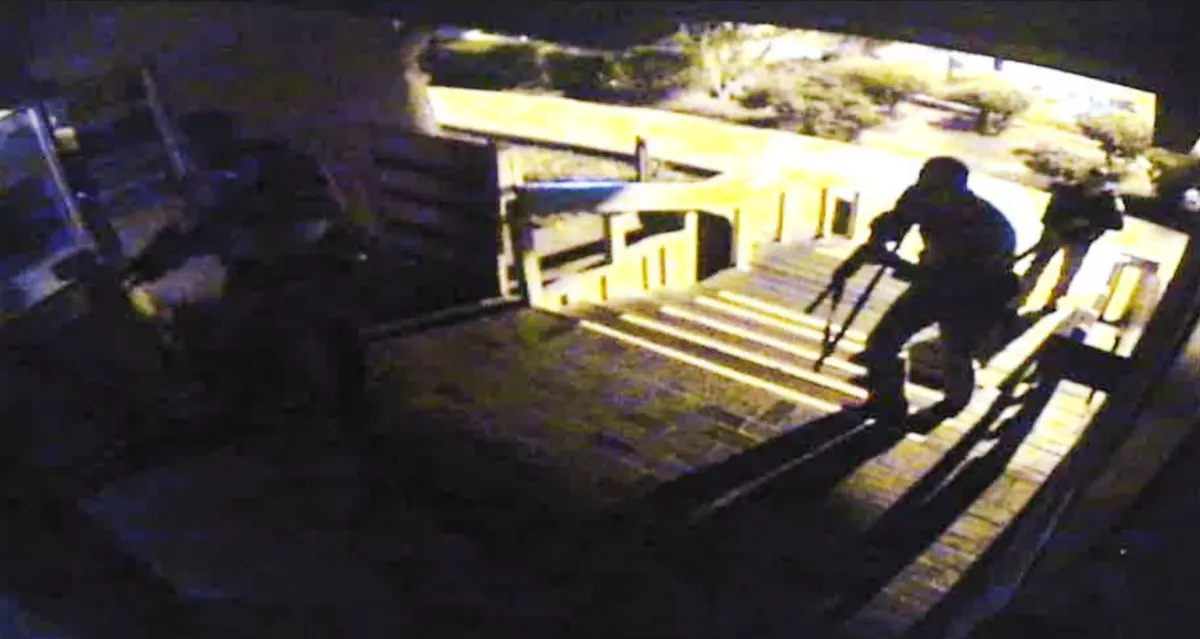
Sgt. Helus and the two CHP officers approaching the entrance of the bar.

At 11:19 p.m., two California Highway Patrol (CHP) officers on a traffic stop nearby were alerted to the shooting by people who had managed to escape. They arrived at the bar's parking lot a minute later and were joined by Ventura County Sheriff's Sgt. Ron Helus four minutes after that. The three officers ventured towards the building, with Helus and one of the CHP officers entering at 11:25 p.m. A minute later, they came under fire from Long, who had been monitoring their movements through the nine security cameras visible on a monitor in the front office where he had been taking shelter. In the ensuing gunfight, Helus was shot five times by Long, who used a flashlight with a laser sight on his pistol in the large, darkened, smoke-filled room. Positioned between Long and the CHP officer, Helus was also accidentally struck by a bullet from the officer's rifle that went through his heart and fatally wounded him. Initially there was confusion and miscommunication as to whether there was an officer down. Responding Ventura County Sheriff's deputies, who were securing the perimeter, located and evacuated Helus outside the building 20 minutes after he had been shot. A SWAT team and other police officers arrived on the scene shortly afterwards.

Long stopped his attack following the exchange of gunfire with police. At 11:37 p.m., he lit a firework and threw it out of the bar's front office. Forty seconds later, he threw another firework out of the office. At 11:38 p.m., he died from shooting himself under the chin. Agents from the Federal Bureau of Investigation, the Bureau of Alcohol, Tobacco, Firearms and Explosives, and the Department of Homeland Security were deployed to further investigate the scene along with EMTs and paramedics from the Ventura County Fire Department and AMR to assist victims. Nineteen survivors were rescued from inside the bar in total.

== Victims ==
Nine men and three women died during the shooting. Seven were college students, and one other a recent graduate. The four others killed were 54-year-old Ventura County Sheriff's Sgt. Ron Helus; a 48-year-old bouncer; a 33-year-old Marine Corps veteran; and a 27-year-old Navy veteran who was at the 2017 Las Vegas shooting during the Route 91 Harvest music festival. They all died from multiple gunshots, and one victim was also stabbed in the neck. Ten of the civilians died inside the bar, while the eleventh died outside. Sixteen others were injured, with only one being injured by gunfire. According to the chief coroner, all of the fatal victims had suffered non-survivable wounds due to the gunman shooting the victims in vital areas, and thus, none of them would have survived even if immediate medical attention was available to them.

== Perpetrator ==
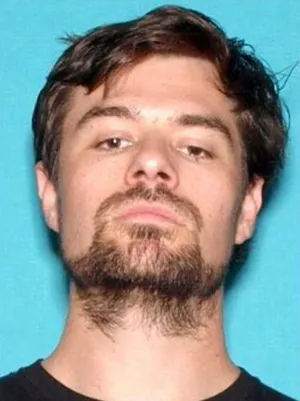
Long in 2017

Ventura County Sheriff Geoff Dean identified the gunman as 28-year-old Ian David Long. His gun was reportedly purchased legally. Long was born on March 27, 1990, in Orange, California. Long's parents separated and eventually divorced when he was two to three years old. His father died while he was still a child. He and his mother moved frequently due to her job, but they eventually settled in nearby Newbury Park. While he previously lived with roommates in Reseda, Long was living with his mother at the time of the shooting. Long's friends said he had been at the bar with them, and some considered him a regular patron.

Long attended Newbury Park High School for his junior and senior years, graduating in June 2008. He served in the United States Marine Corps from August 2008 to March 2013, reaching the rank of corporal, and he had deployed to Afghanistan from November 2010 to June 2011. After being honorably discharged, Long attended California State University, Northridge as an athletic training major from 2013 to 2016, but he did not graduate. During this time, he had been involved in a motorcycle accident that left him with a collapsed lung; his motorcycle helmet was cracked, and he was diagnosed with "adjustment disorder with mixed anxiety and depressed mood, post-traumatic stress disorder (PTSD), combat and military operational stress reaction, and chronic pain." According to his mother, he had begun to "unravel" after the incident. Long had two prior contacts with the Ventura County Sheriff's Office, one in 2006 involving a traffic collision and the other in 2015 involving a bar fight; no charges were filed in either incident.

Police and a mental health crisis team visited Long in 2017 for his irate and irrational behavior, but they decided not to detain him at a psychiatric facility. A high school teacher raised claims that Long had physically assaulted her as a student but she was encouraged not to push the incident so as to not endanger his future in the Marine Corps. In her statement, the teacher alleged that Long had issues long before his military service. Although he had served overseas in the military, behavioral scientist and clinical psychologist Lisa Jaycox said that it was premature to say whether Long suffered from PTSD or if it was a factor in the shooting.

== Investigation ==
A 434-page report from the Ventura County Sheriff's Office was released in June 2021, which detailed the findings of the investigation into Long's actions and motivation. It concluded that Long had held a strong disdain for civilians and anyone not associated with any branch of the US military, and that he had suffered from PTSD from his time in the military. However, the Ventura sheriff stated that the investigation did not show with absolute certainty that a hatred of college students was the motive, instead it was more a working theory. The report had been compiled with information from interviews with eyewitnesses, officers and deputies, and family, friends and acquaintances of Long and was a joint effort by Ventura County sheriff's detectives and FBI analysts. Investigators detailed several encounters that Long had with other students at California State University, Northridge, such as a time when another student told him that "anyone who joined the military deserved to be shot and killed overseas", potentially fueling his separation from and animosity towards other students.

A separate 86-page report was released in March 2021 by the Ventura County Sheriff with thirty recommendations for the sheriff's department to improve their response to mass shootings. Earlier in the year, similar findings had been released by the Ventura County District Attorney's Office.

== Aftermath ==
Within 24 hours of the shooting, the Woolsey Fire forced the evacuation of many people in the area, including several survivors. The mother of a victim who died in the Thousand Oaks shooting after surviving the 2017 Las Vegas shooting called for gun control legislation from legislators. The only gun store in the town told reporters that there was an increase in individuals looking to purchase a weapon for protection on the day after the shooting.

The Ventura County Board of Supervisors formed the Task Force on Mental Health & Safety in response to the shooting. Initially composed of key county officials, the ongoing task force looks for gaps in the systems that protect the public and that provide mental health care and makes recommendations on how to prevent and lessen the damage from mass shootings.

In 2019, the owners of Borderline Bar & Grill said they planned to renovate and reopen the location, but the building was demolished in 2023 and never reopened . In 2020, they opened a different location in Agoura Hills, California, called BL Dancehall & Saloon.

In 2022, the Ventura County Sheriff's Office released to its website multiple audio and video recordings from the shooting after being sued by The Star and other media organizations for access to the materials. In total the county released all recordings of police radio communication, ninety-four emergency calls, security footage from inside the bar and fourteen dashboard and body-camera videos from responding officers.

== Memorials ==
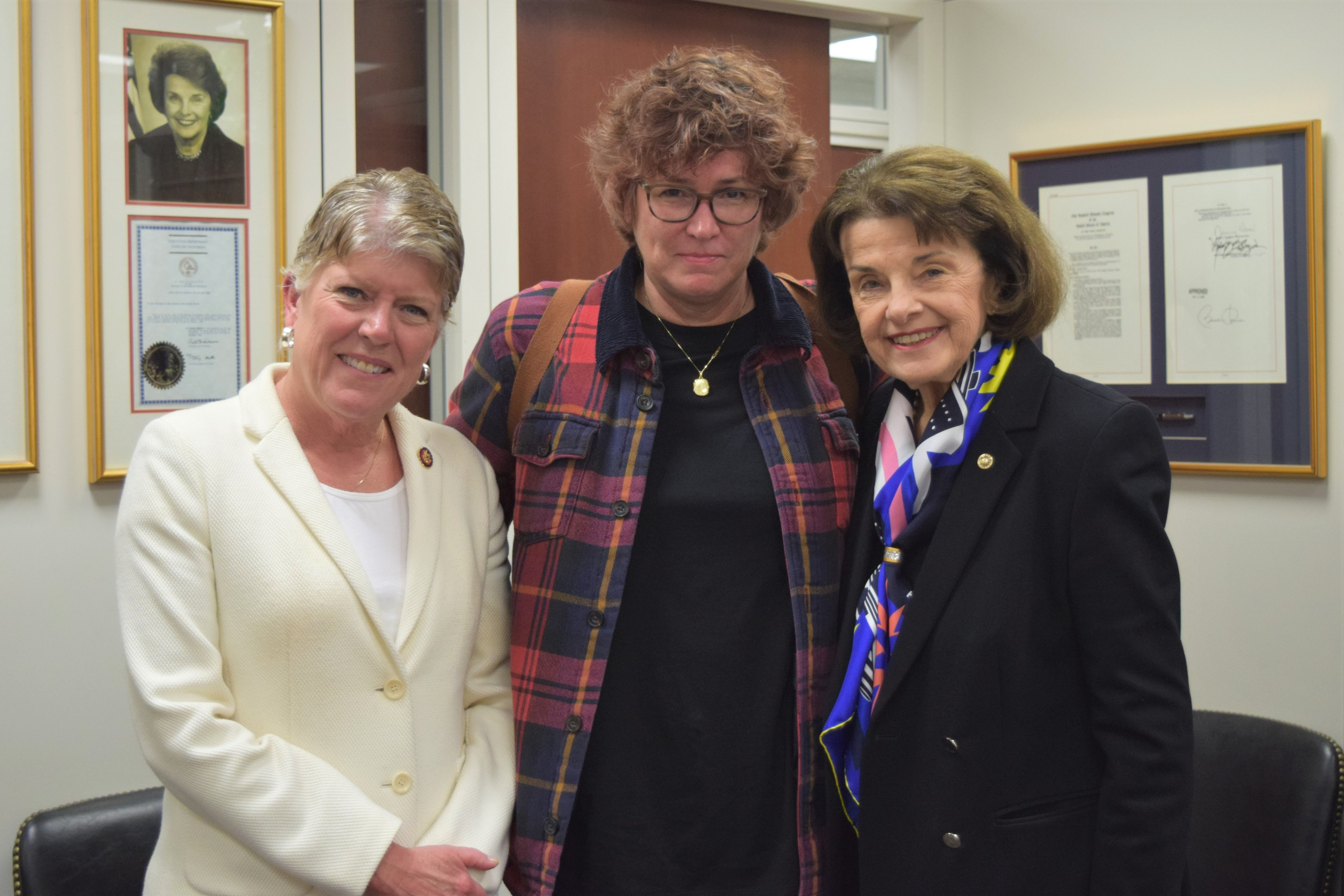
Susan Orfanos, whose son was killed in the shooting, meets with Julia Brownley and Dianne Feinstein about gun violence in 2020.

On November 15, 2018, the funeral for Helus was held. Law enforcement officers, local and state leaders including California Governor Jerry Brown and Governor-Elect Gavin Newsom, as well as local citizens attended his funeral. A vigil at Calvary Community Church in nearby Westlake Village, for two of their congregation, was attended by around 500 mourners.

Numerous national sports teams highlighted the victims and donated money to those affected by the shooting. Victims were provided with these donations immediately after the shooting. Each victim's family was provided with $20,000 for burial costs. After a third distribution in March 2019, a total of $3.6 million had been contributed by more than 25,000 people and through more than 200 fundraisers. The funds were distributed to the families of victims, those physically injured, and others present in the establishment. A local foundation received and distributed the funds in a cooperative effort without charging any administrative fees.

The "Healing Garden" memorial at Conejo Creek Park was dedicated a year after the incident. In 2021 it was announced that twelve sculptures to represent the lives lost would be installed in the Civic Arts Plaza Park.

== See also ==
- Gun laws in California
- Gun law in the United States
- Gun politics in the United States
- Gun violence in the United States
- List of homicides in California
- List of mass shootings in the United States in 2018
- List of rampage killers in the United States
- List of shootings in California
- Mass shootings in the United States
