= Jonah Monheim =

American football player (born 2002)

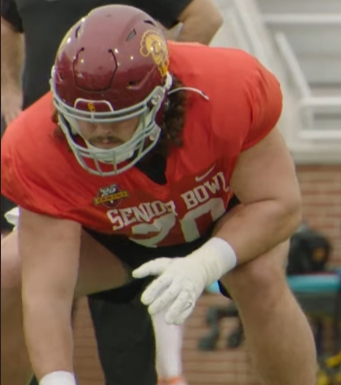
- Monheim at the 2025 Senior Bowl

No. 60 – Jacksonville Jaguars
- Position: Center
- Roster status: Active

Personal information
- Born: June 7, 2002 (age 24); Moorpark, California, U.S.
- Listed height: 6 ft 5 in (1.96 m)
- Listed weight: 310 lb (141 kg)

Career information
- High school: Moorpark (CA)
- College: USC (2020–2024)
- NFL draft: 2025: 7th round, 221st overall pick

Career history
- Jacksonville Jaguars (2025–present)

Awards and highlights
- PFWA All-Rookie Team (2025); Third-team All-Big Ten (2024)

Career NFL statistics as of 2025
- Games played: 17
- Games started: 2
- Stats at Pro Football Reference

Jonah Monheim (born June 7, 2002) is an American professional football center for the Jacksonville Jaguars of the National Football League (NFL). He played college football for the USC Trojans and was selected by the Jaguars in the seventh round of the 2025 NFL draft.

== Early life ==
Monheim attended Moorpark High School in California where he was a three-year starter on the offensive line. He was highly recruited there and received a number of honors, including Camino League Co-Offensive Lineman of the Year, first-team all-state, first-team all-area, PrepStar All-American and selection to the Tacoma News Tribune's Western 100. He was ranked a four-star recruit, the 13th-best offensive guard nationally and the 26th-best player in the state, and committed to play college football for the USC Trojans.

== College career ==
Monheim appeared in one game as a true freshman at USC in 2020. The following year, he appeared in 12 games, seven as a starter at right tackle. In 2022, he started 14 games – 11 at right tackle and three at right guard – and was chosen honorable mention All-Pac-12 Conference. Entering the 2023 season, Monheim moved to left tackle. He started all 13 games – 12 at left tackle and once at right guard – and was chosen second-team All-Pac-12 by the Associated Press (AP). He announced his return for a final season in 2024 and moved to center.

== Professional career ==
Pre-draft measurables
Height	Weight	Arm length	Hand span	Wingspan
6 ft 4 1/8 in (1.93 m)	302 lb (137 kg)	30 1/8 in (0.77 m)	9 1/4 in (0.23 m)	6 ft 5 in (1.96 m)
All values from NFL Combine

Monheim was selected in the seventh round, with the 221st pick of the 2025 NFL draft by the Jacksonville Jaguars.
