= Brian Blechen =

American football player (born 1991)

No. 50, 53
- Position: Linebacker

Personal information
- Born: September 30, 1991 (age 35); Moorpark, California, U.S.
- Listed height: 6 ft 2 in (1.88 m)
- Listed weight: 230 lb (104 kg)

Career information
- High school: Moorpark (CA)
- College: Utah (2010-2014)
- NFL draft: 2015: undrafted

Career history
- Carolina Panthers (2015–2016)*; New Orleans Saints (2016)*; Carolina Panthers (2017)*
- * Offseason or practice squad member only
- Stats at Pro Football Reference

Brian Blechen (born September 30, 1991) is an American former professional football linebacker. He played college football for the Utah Utes.

== Professional career ==
=== Carolina Panthers (first stint) ===
On May 8, 2015, Blechen was signed as an undrafted free agent by the Carolina Panthers. On September 5, 2015, he was released by the Panthers. On September 7, 2015, Blechen was signed to the Panthers' practice squad. On September 22, 2015, he was released from practice squad. On December 1, 2015, he was re-signed to practice squad. On February 7, 2016, Blechen's Panthers played in Super Bowl 50. In the game, the Panthers fell to the Denver Broncos by a score of 24–10. On February 9, 2016. Blechen signed a futures contract with the Carolina Panthers.

On September 3, 2016, Blechen was waived by the Panthers as part of final roster cuts. The next day, he was signed to the Panthers' practice squad. He was released by the Panthers on November 3, 2016.

=== New Orleans Saints ===
On December 28, 2016, Blechen was signed to the Saints' practice squad.

=== Carolina Panthers (second stint) ===
On January 4, 2017, Blechen signed a reserve/future contract with the Panthers. On June 13, 2017, he was waived by the Panthers.
