= Chaparral Middle School =

Chaparral Middle School could refer to

- Chaparral Middle School (Diamond Bar, California)
- Chaparral Middle School (Moorpark, California)
