= Happy Camp Canyon Regional Park =

Park in California, United States

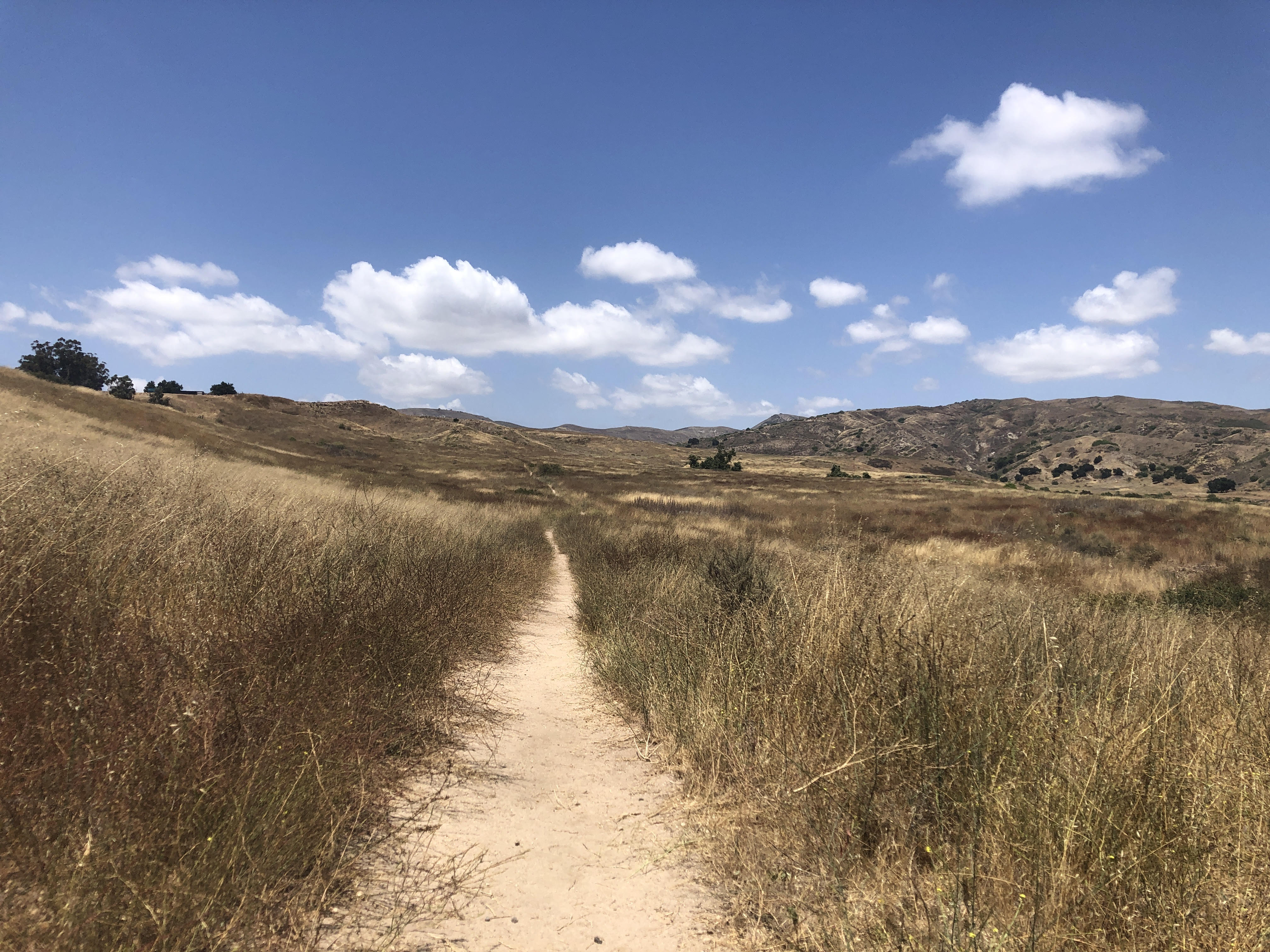
- Interactive map showing location of Happy Camp Canyon Regional Park
- Location: Moorpark, California
- Coordinates: 34.339°N 118.860°W
- Area: 3,000-acre (1,200 ha)
- Operator: Mountains Recreation and Conservation Authority

Happy Camp Canyon Regional Park is a 3,000-acre (1,200 ha) regional park located in the eastern foothills of Moorpark, California. The park has been run by the Mountains Recreation and Conservation Authority since 1990.

== Trails ==
There are 12.5 miles (20.1 km) of trails in the park, ranked at a moderate difficulty. One of the longest trails in the park is Happy Camp Loop, at 10.7 miles (17.2 km) long.

== Wildlife ==
The park has been known to have native wildlife from the region, including deer and mountain lions. A mountain lion sighting caused a closure of the park in 1994.

== Fire history ==
Happy Camp Regional Park is prone to seasonal brush fires and has burned in the Happy Camp Fire (2013), Guiberson Fire (2009), and Day Fire (2006). Portions of the park have also been used for live burn trainings by the Ventura County Fire Department.
