= Grant Rohach =

American football player and coach (born 1994)

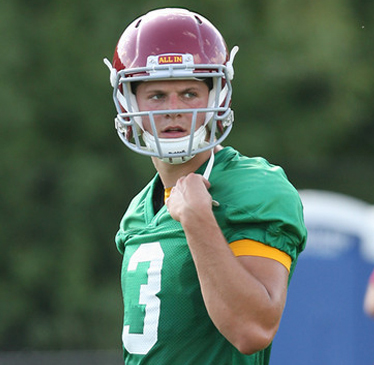
- Rohach with Iowa State in 2013

Des Moines Christian School (IA)
- Title: Assistant coach

Personal information
- Born: February 5, 1994 (age 32); Iowa City, Iowa, U.S.
- Listed height: 6 ft 2 in (1.88 m)
- Listed weight: 218 lb (99 kg)

Career information
- High school: Moorpark (CA)
- College: Iowa State (2012–2015); Buffalo (2016–2017)
- NFL draft: 2017: undrafted

Career history

Playing
- Iowa Barnstormers (2018)

Coaching
- Grand View (2017) Quarterbacks coach; Simpson (2018) Quarterbacks coach; Kansas State (2019) Graduate assistant; Mount Marty (2020) Offensive coordinator; Des Moines Christian School (IA) (2022–present) Assistant coach

Grant Rohach (born February 5, 1994) is an American former professional football quarterback. Rohach played college football for the Iowa State Cyclones and Buffalo Bulls.

== Early life ==
Rohach attended Moorpark High School in Moorpark, California. He committed to Iowa State to play for coach Paul Rhoads.

== College career ==
=== Iowa State ===
Rohach was redshirted as a freshman in 2012. For the 2013 season, he served as the primary backup quarterback to Cyclones starting quarterback Sam Richardson, starting the final four games of the season against TCU, Oklahoma, Kansas, and West Virginia, recording wins over the Jayhawks and Mountaineers. For the 2014 season, Rohach again served as the backup to Richardson, making one start on the season against Kansas. Rohach again served as the backup quarterback, but did not play at all during the 2015 season, leading to speculation that he would seek a transfer to another school in search of more playing time. On December 1, 2015, Rohach announced that he would transfer.

=== Buffalo ===
In December 2015, Rohach announced that he was transferring to Buffalo to play for coach Lance Leipold. As a graduate senior transfer, he was able to play immediately for the Bulls. Rohach was named Buffalo's starting quarterback to start the 2016 season. After a season-opening loss to Albany, Rohach was benched in favor of redshirt freshman Tyree Jackson. He made one more start, against Bowling Green in the final game of the season, following an injury to Jackson.

== Professional career ==
On October 5, 2017, Rohach signed with the Iowa Barnstormers of the Indoor Football League. In five games, he completed 24 of 43 pass attempts for 295 yards and 7 touchdowns. He also rushed for 106 yards and three touchdowns.

== Current career ==
Since the fall of 2022, Grant Rohach has taught US History, Intro to Engineering, and Computer Apps for Business at Des Moines Christian School in Urbandale, IA. He also is the assistant coach of the DMCS varsity football team, offensive coordinator for the DMCS varsity football team, and the head DMCS boys track coach.
