= Moorpark Unified School District =

School district in Ventura County, California

Address
- 5297 Maureen Lane Moorpark, California, 93021; United States

District information
- Type: Public
- Grades: K–12
- Superintendent: Dr. Kelli Hays
- NCES District ID: 0625690

Students and staff
- Students: 5,845 (2020–2021)
- Teachers: 264.5 (FTE)
- Staff: 284.33 (FTE)
- Student–teacher ratio: 22.1:1

Other information
- Website: www.mrpk.org

Moorpark Unified School District is a public school district based in Moorpark, Ventura County, California. As of 2022, the district's superintendent is Dr. Kelli Hays.

In addition to Moorpark, it includes a portion of Santa Rosa Valley.

== Schools ==
There are 10 schools in the district.

High schools

- Moorpark High School
- The High School at Moorpark College

Middle schools

- Chaparral Middle School
- Mesa Verde Middle School

Elementary schools

- Arroyo West Active Learning Academy
- Flory Academy of Sciences & Technology
- Mountain Meadows 21st Century Learning Academy
- Peach Hill Academy
- Walnut Canyon Arts & Technology Magnet School
- Campus Canyon College Preparatory Academy (K–8)

It previously operated a continuation high school called Moorpark Community School.
