= Ventura County Community College District =

Coordinates: 34.2189°N 119.0579°W

Ventura County Community College District (VCCCD) is the system of public community colleges in Ventura County, California. The district is a member of the California Community Colleges System. VCCCD member colleges are Ventura College in Ventura, California, Moorpark College in Moorpark, California and Oxnard College in Oxnard, California. The district was formed in 1962 after previous administration of Ventura College had been in combination with the Ventura High School District.

The district offices share a building with the Ventura Unified School District at 255 W. Stanley Ave., Ventura. The building was the corporate headquarters for Kinkos until 2002.

== Member colleges ==
=== Ventura College ===
Ventura College opened in 1925 as part of Ventura Union High School; its current campus opened in 1955 and is 112 acres (45 ha), serving approximately 14,500 students. It also operates a satellite campus in Santa Paula, California.

=== Moorpark College ===
Moorpark College opened in 1967. Its campus is 150 acres (61 ha), serving approximately 14,250 students

=== Oxnard College ===
Oxnard College's first classes were held in Ramona School starting in 1969 with the current campus opening in 1975. Its campus size is 118 acres (48 ha).
