= Gene Berg =

American chemist

Gene Berg is a professor of Chemistry at Moorpark College in Moorpark, California. He has been teaching at Moorpark College since 1970, and became the college's ninth Distinguished Faculty Chair in 2005.

Dr. Berg earned his doctorate in Analytical Chemistry from UCLA.
