= Pennymac =

American residential mortgage company

PennyMac Financial Services, Inc.
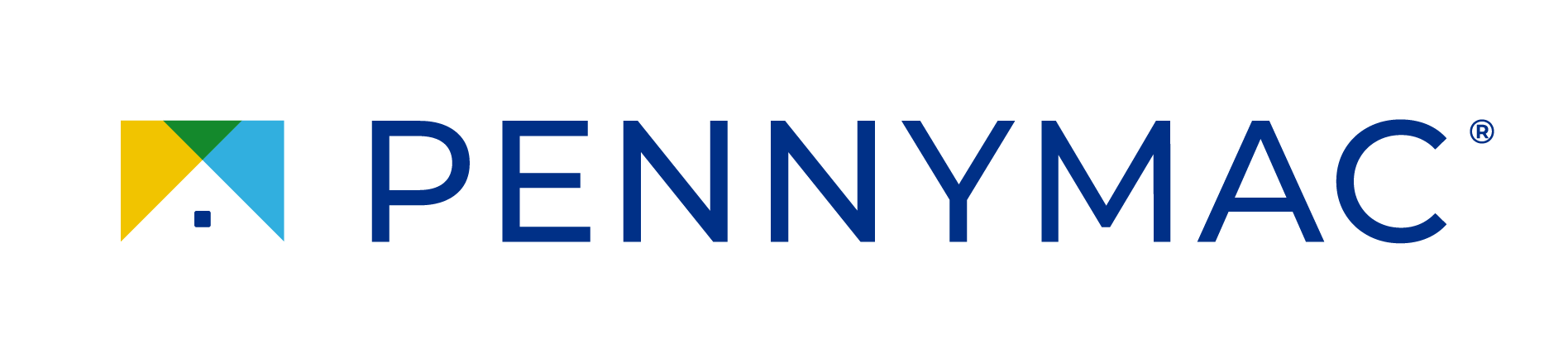
- Type: Public company
- Traded as: NYSE: PFSI; Russell 2000 Component
- Industry: Mortgage lending and servicing
- Founded: 2008
- Founder: Stanford Kurland
- Headquarters: Westlake Village, California, United States
- Area served: United States
- Key people: David Spector, CEO and Chairman: Doug Jones, President and Chief Mortgage Banking Officer; Kevin Ryan, Chief Strategy Officer; Daniel Perotti, CFO
- Products: 30-year fixed-rate mortgages, 15-year fixed-rate mortgages, FHA loans, VA loans, ARM loans, jumbo loans
- Revenue: ▲US$2.05billion (2025)
- Operating income: ▲US$560 million (2026)
- Net income: ▲US$501.1 million (2025)
- Total assets: ▲US$29.39 billion (2025)
- Total equity: ▲US$5.31 billion (2025)
- Number of employees: 4,900 (2025)
- Subsidiaries: PennyMac Loan Services, LLC; PNMAC Capital Management, LLC., Private National Mortgage Acceptance Company, LLC., PNMAC Holdings, Inc.
- Website: pennymac.com

PennyMac Financial Services, Inc. is an American residential mortgage company headquartered in Westlake Village, California. The company's business focuses on the production and servicing of U.S. mortgage loans and the management of investments related to the U.S. mortgage market. Pennymac operates through two subsidiaries: PennyMac Loan Services, LLC and PNMAC Capital Management, LLC. The latter manages the PennyMac Mortgage Investment Trust (NYSE: PMT), a mortgage REIT.

In 2025, Pennymac was named the top overall mortgage lender and top correspondent lender by Scotsman Guide, and ranked fourth among the largest U.S. mortgage lenders by direct loan origination volume according to Bankrate and CNBC. In its production segment, the company conducts its business through three main channels: correspondent lending, broker direct, and consumer direct. Although its name resembles government-sponsored enterprises like Freddie Mac and Farmer Mac, it has always been a private-sector entity.

== History ==
Pennymac was founded in 2008 (during the subprime mortgage crisis) by Stanford Kurland, the former President of Countrywide Financial, with financial support from BlackRock and Highfields Capital Management. The company was set up with the aim to help stabilize the housing market and to avoid home foreclosures by buying up distressed mortgages. Though Pennymac's efforts did aid distressed homeowners, the company was also criticized because its founder and many of its executives previously held leadership positions at Countrywide Financial. The critics argued this group contributed to questionable lending practices at Countrywide and thus shared blame for the subprime mortgage crisis, and that this group was now capitalizing on that crisis through Pennymac. Though Kurland acknowledged his role in pushing for high-risk lending practices at Countrywide and regretted the turn of events there and in the overall industry, he argued he did not deserve blame because the riskiest lending took place after he left Countrywide and because he always insisted loans went to those who could afford to repay them.

Pennymac later began refinancing and originating mortgages online and buying loans from smaller lenders.

On 30 July, 2009, the company publicly listed the PennyMac Mortgage Investment Trust, a mortgage REIT managed through its subsidiary PNMAC. The IPO raised $335 million, less than half of the $750 million the company had expected. On May 14, 2013, PennyMac Financial Services was listed on the New York Stock Exchange under the ticker PFSI, raising $200 million. Pennymac is a member of the Russell 2000 Index. At the time of its IPO, Pennymac had more than 600 employees at its Moorpark, California headquarters, making it one of the largest private employers and biggest tenants in the city. It moved to its current headquarters in Westlake Village in 2015.

In 2019, Pennymac surpassed $1 billion in revenue for the first time. That year the company also became the third largest mortgage lender in the U.S. in 2019 with $118 billion in unpaid principal balance (accounting for a market share of around 5%), the sixth largest mortgage servicer with a servicing portfolio of $369 billion in unpaid principal balance, and the largest aggregator of residential mortgage loans. The company more than doubled its annual revenue in 2020, mainly attributable to favorable business conditions due the low interest rates resulting from the federal government's efforts to fight the economic impact of the COVID-19 pandemic.

In 2020, Pennymac saw loan origination value surpass $36 billion across over 117,000 mortgages, making them the 15th largest mortgage lender by dollar value for this period. In 2022, Pennymac rebranded its wholesale division as Pennymac TPO. According to Pennymac, as of year-end 2025, their servicing portfolio had approximately $734 billion in unpaid principal balance.

On June 16, 2026, Pennymac named Amazon Web Services (AWS) as its preferred cloud provider.

== Business structure ==
Pennymac conducts business in three segments, namely mortgage production, mortgage servicing (together, production and servicing comprise mortgage banking activities), and investment management.

The company's mortgage production focuses on the origination of first lien and government-backed or guaranteed mortgage loans through three methods:

- Correspondent Lending. Pennymac acquires newly originated loans from small banks and independent originators.
- Consumer Direct Lending. The retail lending business originates new prime credit quality, first lien residential conventional and government-insured mortgage loans on a national basis to allow customers to purchase or refinance their homes.
- Broker Direct Lending. The company obtains loan application packages from nonaffiliated mortgage loan brokers, then underwrites and funds the resulting loans for sale to PennyMac Mortgage Investment Trust or investors.

In total, almost $200 billion in loans are produced through these three methods.

The loan servicing segment performs loan administration, collection, and default management activities, and totals to $427 billion in unpaid principal balance in 2020. The investment management segment consists of management fees received from the PNMAC subsidiary for its management of the PennyMac Mortgage Investment Trust.
