= High School at Moorpark College =

Coordinates: 34°17′55″N 118°50′10″W

The High School at Moorpark College
- 7075 Campus Road; Moorpark, CA 93021, United States

Information
- Type: Public
- Established: 2000
- Principal: Jennifer Silva
- Teaching staff: 3.32 (FTE)
- Grades: 9-12
- Enrollment: 101 (2023–2024)
- Student to teacher ratio: 30.42
- Colors: Blue, White
- Mascot: Phoenix
- Website: https://hsmc.mrpk.org/

The High School at Moorpark College is a middle college located on the campus of Moorpark College in Moorpark, California, United States. It was founded with a grant from the California Community College Chancellor's Office in February 2000, The High School at Moorpark College is a partnership between Moorpark College and Moorpark Unified School District.
