= Drake London =

American football player (born 2001)

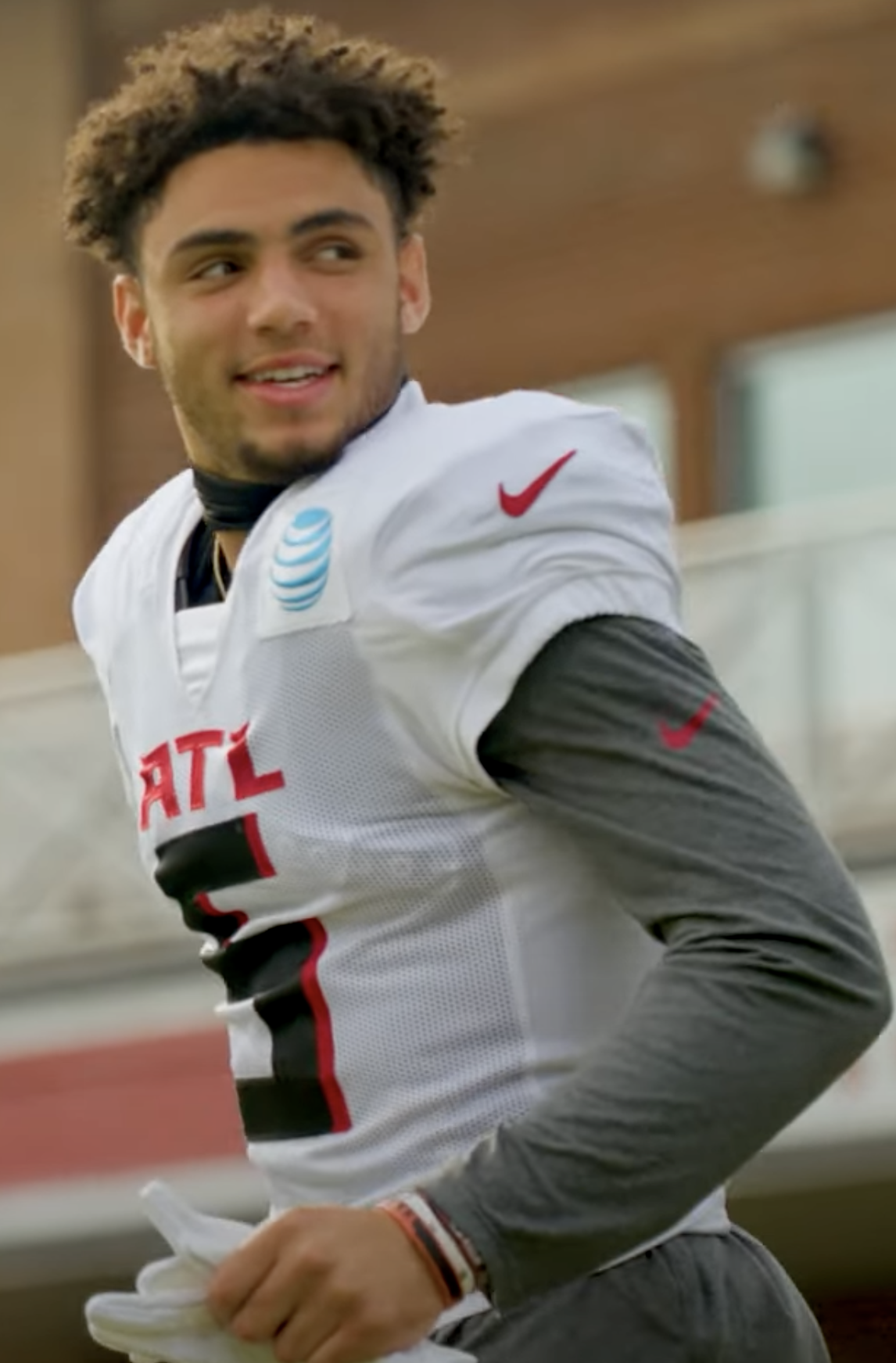
- London with the Atlanta Falcons in 2022

No. 5 – Atlanta Falcons
- Position: Wide receiver
- Roster status: Active

Personal information
- Born: July 24, 2001 (age 25)
- Listed height: 6 ft 4 in (1.93 m)
- Listed weight: 215 lb (98 kg)

Career information
- High school: Moorpark
- College: USC (2019–2021)
- NFL draft: 2022: 1st round, 8th overall pick

Career history
- Atlanta Falcons (2022–present)

Awards and highlights
- Pac-12 Offensive Player of the Year (2021); First-team All-Pac-12 (2021); Second-team All-Pac-12 (2020)

Career NFL statistics as of Week 8, 2026
- Receptions: 348
- Receiving yards: 4,585
- Receiving touchdowns: 23
- Stats at Pro Football Reference

Drake London (born July 24, 2001) is an American professional football wide receiver for the Atlanta Falcons of the National Football League (NFL). He played college football for the USC Trojans and was selected eighth overall by the Falcons in the 2022 NFL draft.

== Early life ==
London grew up in an interracial family, the son of black father Dwan and white mother Cindi. He attended Moorpark High School in Moorpark, California. He played football and basketball in high school. As a senior on the football team, he had 62 receptions for 1,089 yards and 12 touchdowns. As a senior in basketball he averaged 29.2 points, 11.9 rebounds and 3.8 assists per game. London committed to the University of Southern California (USC) to play both football and basketball.

== College career ==
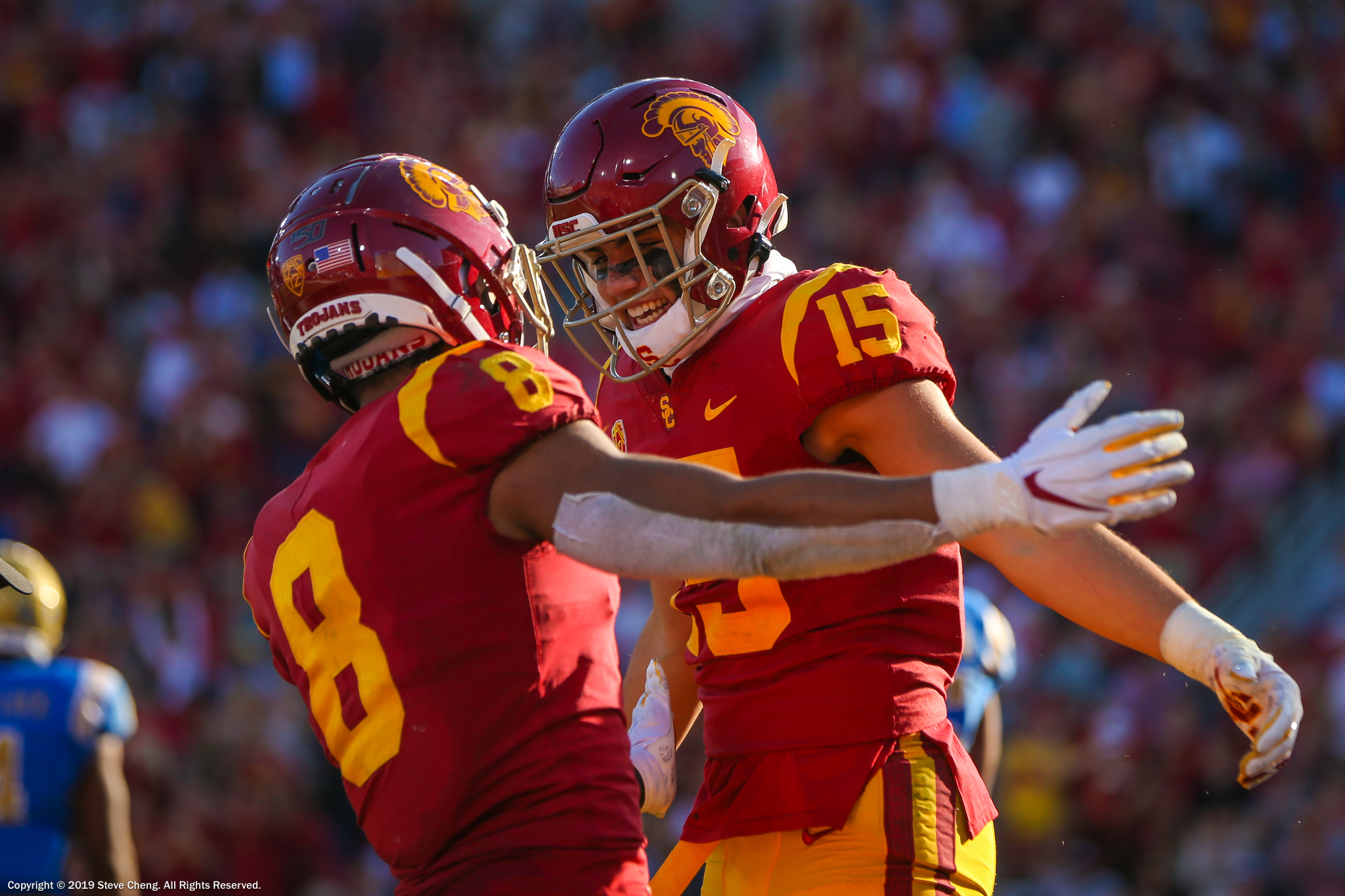
London #15 celebrates with Amon-Ra St. Brown while at USC.

As a true freshman in football, London started nine of 13 games, recording 39 receptions for 567 yards and five touchdowns. As a freshman in basketball, he played in three games and had three rebounds. He returned to the football team as a sophomore in 2020 as one of the team's top receivers. London was named the Pac-12 Offensive Player of the Year in 2021. During Southern Cal's eighth game of the 2021 season, London fractured his right ankle, forcing him to miss the rest of the year. London declared for the 2022 NFL draft following the season.

== Professional career ==
Pre-draft measurables
Height	Weight	Arm length	Hand span	Wingspan
6 ft 3 7/8 in (1.93 m)	219 lb (99 kg)	33 in (0.84 m)	9 3/8 in (0.24 m)	6 ft 5 3/4 in (1.97 m)
All values from NFL Combine

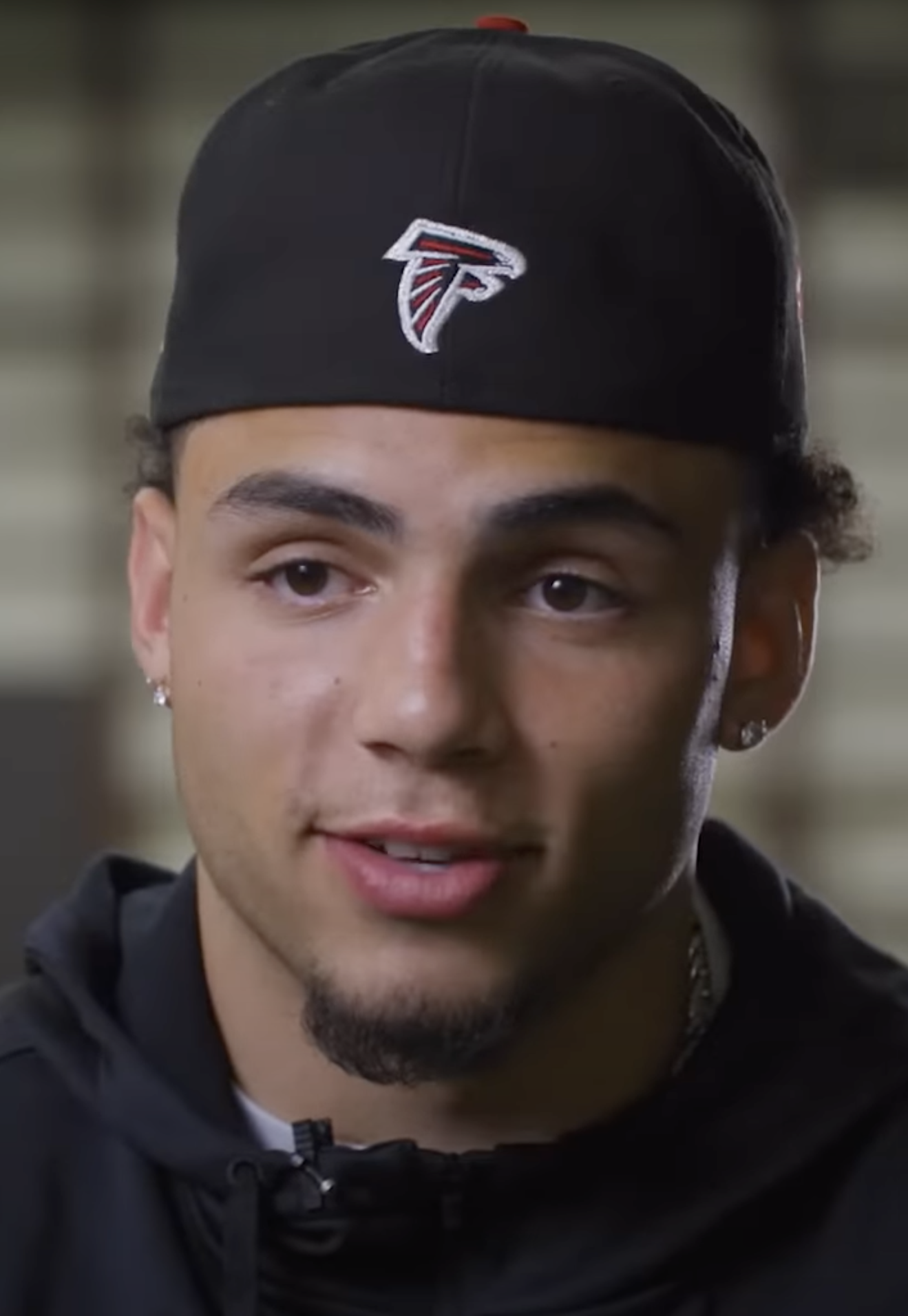
London in 2022

London was selected in the first round with the eighth overall by the Atlanta Falcons in the 2022 NFL draft. He was the first wide receiver taken.

=== 2022 season ===
London made his NFL debut in week 1 against the New Orleans Saints where he had five receptions for 74 yards. In week 2 against the Los Angeles Rams, London had a season-high eight receptions for 86 yards and recorded his first professional touchdown on a four-yard reception from Marcus Mariota. In week 18 against the Tampa Bay Buccaneers, London recorded his first 100-yard receiving game in the NFL, having six receptions for 120 yards, including a season-long 40 yard reception, in the 30–17 win.

London finished his rookie season with 72 receptions for 866 yards and four touchdowns. London's 72 catches set a rookie reception record for the Falcons, surpassing the mark previously set by Kyle Pitts.

=== 2023 season ===
In week 6 of the 2023 season, London had nine receptions for 125 yards in the loss to the Washington Commanders. In week 14 against the Buccaneers, he had ten receptions for 172 yards in the loss. In his second season, London appeared in and started 16 games. He finished with 69 receptions for 905 yards and two touchdowns.

=== 2024 season ===
During week 2 on Monday Night Football against the Philadelphia Eagles, London recorded six receptions for 54 yards, including a game-winning touchdown with 34 seconds left in regulation, as Atlanta won 22–21. In week 5, on Thursday Night Football, against the Tampa Bay Buccaneers, London had 12 receptions for 154 yards, along with a touchdown catch, in a 36-30 win in overtime, as Kirk Cousins broke the Atlanta Falcons franchise record for most passing yards in a game, throwing for 509 yards. In week 18 against the Carolina Panthers, he had ten receptions for 187 yards and two touchdowns in the 44–38 overtime loss. He finished the 2024 season with 100 receptions for 1,271 yards and nine touchdowns. He was ranked 97th by his fellow players on the NFL Top 100 Players of 2025.

=== 2025 season ===
On April 30, 2025, the Falcons exercised the fifth-year option on London's contract. London will remain with the Falcons through the 2026 season, for which he is guaranteed a salary of $16.8 million. In Week 6 of the 2025 season, he had ten receptions for 158 yards and one touchdown in the 24–14 win over the Buffalo Bills. In Week 9, a 24–23 loss to the New England Patriots, he had nine receptions for 118 yards and three touchdowns. He appeared in 12 games in the 2025 season. He finished with 68 receptions for 919 yards and seven touchdowns.

=== 2026 season ===
On June 2, 2026, London signed a four-year, $141 million contract extension, including $100 million guaranteed, keeping him under contract with the Falcons until 2030.

== Career statistics ==
Legend
**Bold**	Career high

=== NFL ===
Year	Team	Games		Receiving							Fumbles	
Year	Team	GP	GS	Rec	Yds	Avg	Lng	TD	1D	Y/G	Fum	Lost
2022	ATL	17	15	72	866	12.0	40	4	48	50.9	**3**	**3**
2023	ATL	16	16	69	905	13.1	**45**	2	45	56.6	0	0
2024	ATL	17	17	**100**	**1,271**	12.7	39	**9**	**67**	74.8	0	0
2025	ATL	12	12	68	919	**13.5**	43	7	46	**76.6**	1	1
Career		62	60	309	3,961	12.8	45	22	206	63.9	4	4

=== College ===
Season	Team	GP	Receiving				Rushing			
Season	Team	GP	Rec	Yds	Avg	TD	Att	Yds	Avg	TD
2019	USC	13	39	567	14.5	5	0	0	0.0	0
2020	USC	6	33	502	**15.2**	3	0	0	0.0	0
2021	USC	8	**88**	**1,084**	12.3	**7**	**1**	**2**	**2.0**	0
Career		27	160	2,153	13.5	15	1	2	2.0	0
