= Moorpark, California =

City in California, United States

- City
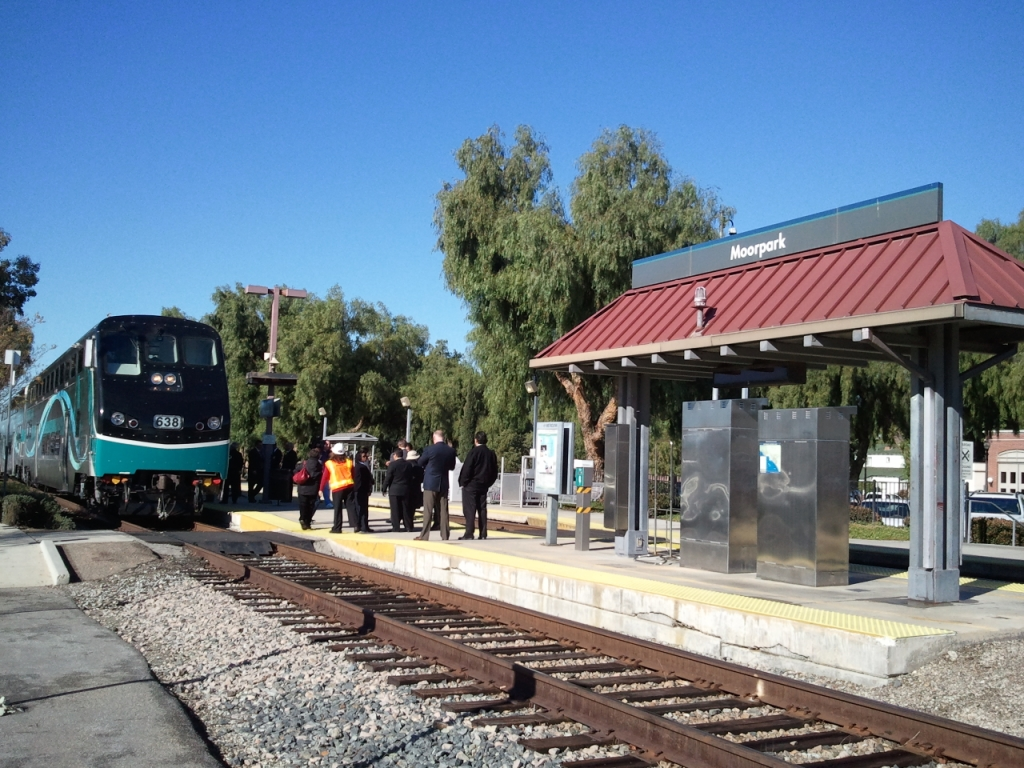
- The Moorpark station for the Metrolink Ventura County Line and Amtrak Pacific Surfliner

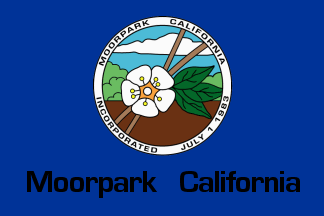
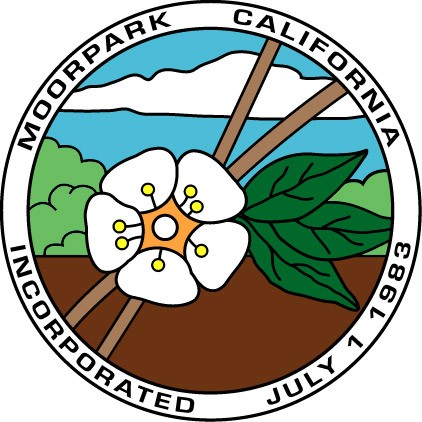
- Flag Seal
- Interactive map of Moorpark, California
- Location in the Los Angeles Metropolitan Area Location in California Location in the United States
- Coordinates: 34°16′52″N 118°52′25″W
- Country: United States
- State: California
- County: Ventura
- Founded: 1887
- Incorporated: 1983-07-01

Government
  - Type: Council-Manager
  - Mayor: Chris Enegren (At-large Term through November 2026)
  - Mayor Pro Tempore: Dr. Antonio Castro (District 4 through November 2028)
  - Councilmember: Renee Delgado (District 1, through November 2026)
  - Councilmember: Chris Barrett (District 2 through November 2028)
  - Councilmember: Tom Means (District 3 through November 2026)

Area
  - Total: 12.46 sq mi (32.28 km^{2})
  - Land: 12.28 sq mi (31.80 km^{2})
  - Water: 0.19 sq mi (0.49 km^{2}) 1.51%
- Elevation: 515 ft (157 m)

Population (2020)
  - Total: 36,284
  - Density: 2,963.0/sq mi (1,144.01/km^{2})
- Time zone: UTC−8 (PST)
  - Summer (DST): UTC−7 (PDT)
- ZIP Code: 93021, 93020 (P.O. Boxes)
- Area code: 805
- FIPS code: 06-49138
- GNIS feature ID: 1652754
- Website: www.moorparkca.gov

Moorpark is a city in Ventura County in Southern California, United States. Moorpark was founded in 1900. The town grew from just over 4,000 citizens in 1980 to over 25,000 by 1990. The population was 36,284 at the 2020 census, up from 34,421 at the 2010 census.

== Etymology ==
The town most likely was named after the Moorpark apricot, which used to grow in the area (hence the apricot flower on the town's seal and flag). The apricot, in turn, was named for Admiral Lord Anson's estate Moor Park in Hertfordshire, England; the apricot was introduced in 1688.

Some of Moorpark's previous unofficial and official names include Epworth, Fremontville, Penrose, Fairview, and Little Simi.

== History ==
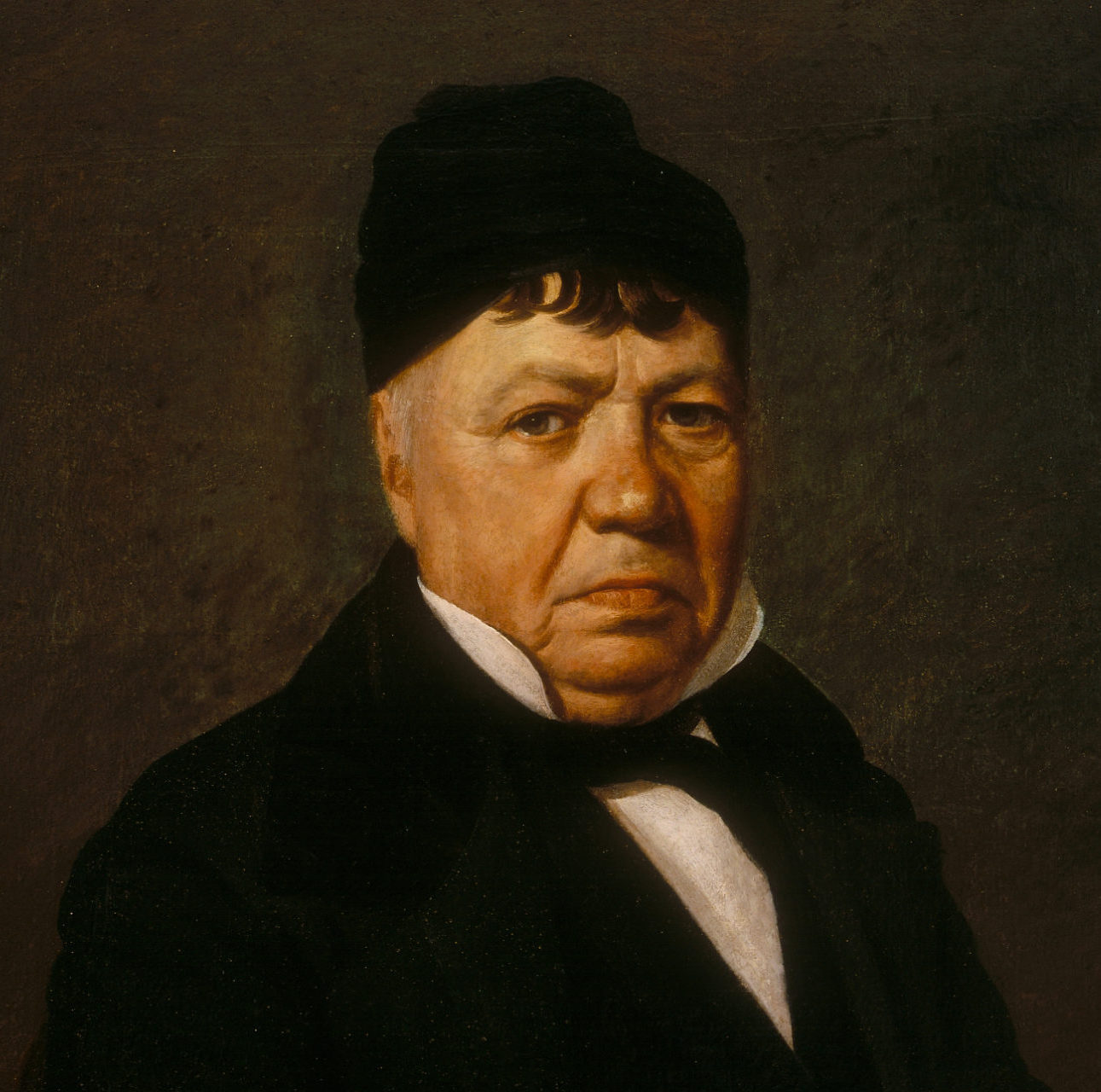
Moorpark was part of Rancho Simi, owned by Don José de la Guerra y Noriega, founder of the prominent Guerra family of California.

Chumash people were the first to inhabit what is now known as Moorpark. A Chumash village, known as Quimisac (Kimishax), was located in today's Happy Camp Canyon Regional Park. They were hunters and gatherers who often traveled between villages to trade. The village of Quimisac once controlled the local trade of fused shale in the region. The area was later part of the large Rancho Simi land grant given in 1795 to the Pico brothers by Governor Diego de Borica of Alta California.

Robert W. Poindexter, the secretary of the Simi Land and Water Company, received the land when the association was disbanded. A map showing the townsite was prepared in November 1900. It was a resubdivision of the large lot subdivision known as Fremont, or Fremontville. An application for a post office was submitted on June 1, 1900, and approved by August of that year. The application noted that the town had a railroad depot. The town grew after the 1904 completion of the 7,369-foot (2,246 m) Santa Susana rail tunnel through the Santa Susana Mountains. Moorpark was then on the main route of the Southern Pacific Railroad's Coast Line between Los Angeles and San Francisco. The depot remained in operation until it was closed in 1958. It was eventually torn down around 1965.

Moorpark was one of the first cities to run on commercial nuclear power in the entire world, and the second in the United States, after Arco, Idaho, on July 17, 1955, which is the first city in the world to be lit by atomic power. For one hour on November 12, 1957, this fact was featured on Edward R. Murrow's See It Now television show. The reactor, called the Sodium Reactor Experiment was built by the Atomics International division of North American Aviation at the nearby Santa Susana Field Laboratory. The Sodium Reactor Experiment operated from 1957 to 1964 and produced 7.5 megawatts of electrical power at a Southern California Edison-supplied generating station.

Moorpark College opened on September 11, 1967. Moorpark College is one of the few colleges to feature an exotic animal training and management program. Moorpark was incorporated as a city on July 1, 1983.

In 1996, Moorpark's Little League All-Star team represented the West Region in the Little League World Series in Williamsport, PA.

In February 2005, a Siberian tiger named Tuffy that escaped from a local residence was shot and killed in one of Moorpark's parks. This created a great uproar, because the animal control officers used a gun instead of a tranquilizer to kill the tiger, primarily because the tiger could not be shot from the proper angle for a tranquilizer to prove effective. Candlelight vigils were held for the late Tuffy. The couple who owned the tiger had moved it from a licensed facility in Temecula, California, to an unlicensed facility in the Moorpark area of Ventura County. They lost their U.S. Department of Agriculture exhibitor license because they failed to notify the department of the move within 10 days. The wife pleaded guilty to a federal misdemeanor count of failing to maintain records of exotic felines. The husband pleaded guilty to obstruction of justice, making false statements and failing to maintain proper records. Each was sentenced to home detention, three years probation, and fined $900.

Just a month later, in March 2005, the fairly complete remains (about 75%) of an unusually old mammoth, possibly the rare southern mammoth (Mammuthus meridionalis), were discovered in the foothills of Moorpark at the site of a housing development. The fossilized skeleton is believed to be from a 800,000 to 1.4 million years old mammoth, which is estimated to have had a weight of ten tons.

In 2006, the Moorpark city council transferred governance of their library from the Ventura County library system to their own newly created city library system. The library, which opened in 1912, celebrated its centennial in 2012.

On February 28, 2006, a housing proposal, North Park Village, which would have added 1,680 houses on 3,586 acres (15 km^{2}) in the northeast area of the city, was defeated by a landslide in a city election.

=== Egg City ===
In 1961, Julius Goldman founded Egg City, the largest chicken ranch in the United States at the time, located just north of Moorpark. Many chicken coops were spread over acres of concrete, with millions of chickens in them. Local residents were somewhat irked by the farm, when the smell of it wafted to Moorpark on windy days. The odors also commonly flowed to the nearby town of Fillmore. The business suffered a setback in 1972, when millions of chickens were slaughtered because of the threat of Newcastle disease. Egg gathering was done from 36 houses by hand, with workers placing eggs onto plastic flats while riding electric carts. Liquid, dry and shell eggs were processed at the 8,000-square-foot (740 m^{2}) hatchery facility warehouse, with yolk and albumen available individually. The farm finally closed in 1996. In early December 2006, a wildfire destroyed the dilapidated remains of Egg City.

== Geography ==
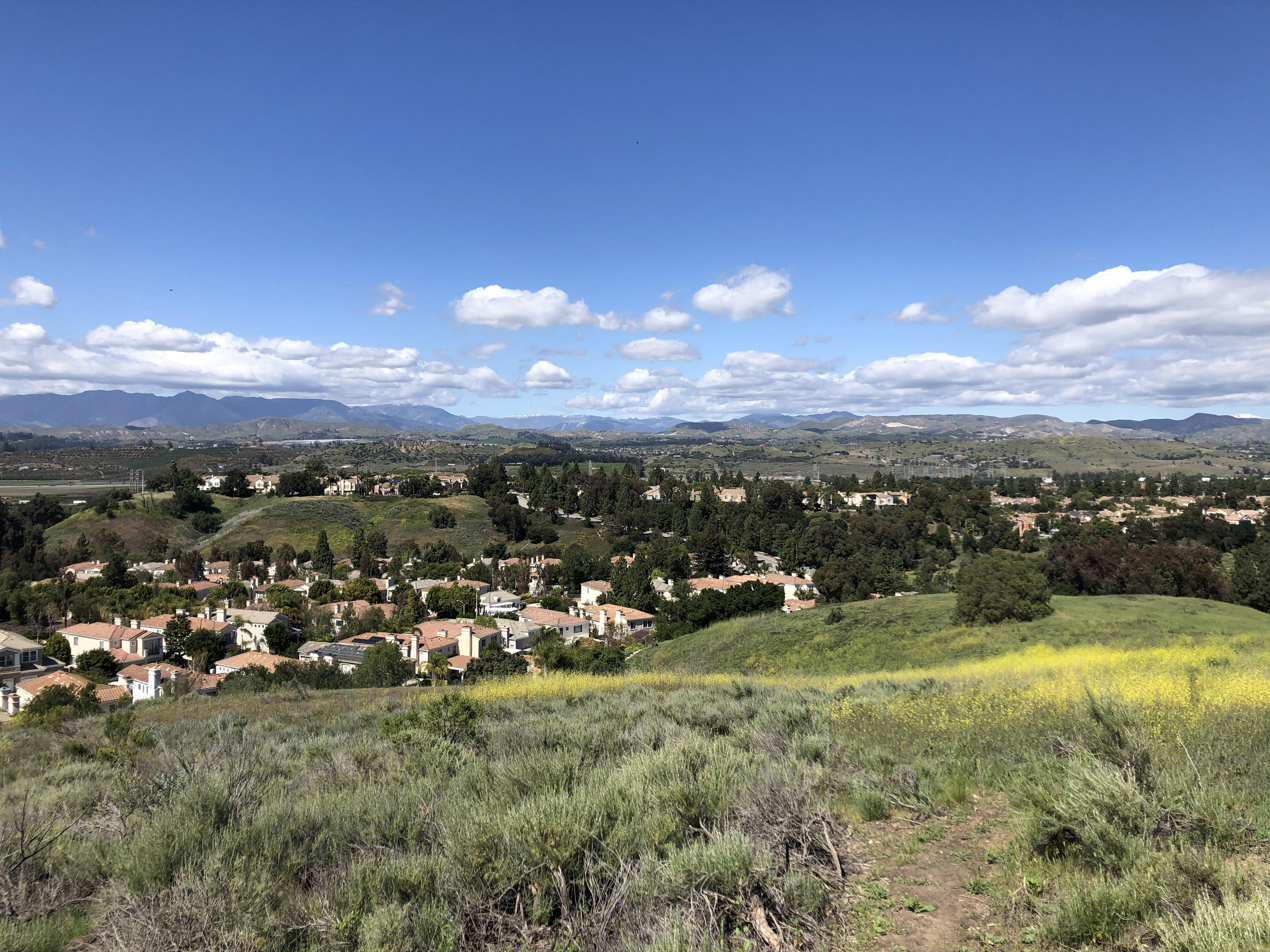
Western Moorpark

Central Moorpark lies in a valley created by the Arroyo Simi river. It is situated on flatlands and mesas at the base of numerous hills. It is located immediately west of Simi Valley, California.

The city is divided by Highway 118, locally known as Los Angeles Avenue. Old Town Moorpark (Downtown) is located north of Route 118. Many newer residential communities can be found south of Route 118.

=== Neighborhoods ===
- Downtown is on High Street at the historic center of the city. The pepper trees that line High Street were planted by Robert Poindexter who was responsible for the plotting and mapping of the town. This area also features the High Street Arts Center (a performing arts center operated by the City of Moorpark), and various restaurants and businesses.
- The Peach Hill and Mountain Meadows neighborhoods are south of the Arroyo Simi. Moorpark High School is in this area, as well as many parks, including the Arroyo Vista Community Park and Recreation Center, the city's largest park. This area contains a large part of the city's population as over 75 percent of homes in Moorpark were constructed after 1980 here and in other new projects.
- Moorpark College is a local community college located on 7075 Campus Rd. The college also hosts a dual enrollment high school, The High School at Moorpark College, allowing students to earn high school and college credits simultaneously. An additional substantial development is occurring to the north of the existing city, in the area of the Moorpark Country Club.

=== Climate ===
Like much of the Greater Los Angeles Area, Moorpark has a Subtropical-Mediterranean climate (Köppen climate classification Csb on the coast, Csb inland), and receives just enough annual precipitation to avoid either Köppen's BSh or BSk (semi-arid climate) classification.

Climate data for Moorpark, California
Month	Jan	Feb	Mar	Apr	May	Jun	Jul	Aug	Sep	Oct	Nov	Dec	Year
Record high °F (°C)	92 (33)	92 (33)	96 (36)	105 (41)	102 (39)	106 (41)	105 (41)	105 (41)	109 (43)	108 (42)	99 (37)	99 (37)	109 (43)
Mean daily maximum °F (°C)	69 (21)	69 (21)	71 (22)	74 (23)	75 (24)	77 (25)	81 (27)	83 (28)	82 (28)	79 (26)	74 (23)	69 (21)	75 (24)
Mean daily minimum °F (°C)	41 (5)	43 (6)	44 (7)	46 (8)	50 (10)	53 (12)	57 (14)	56 (13)	55 (13)	50 (10)	44 (7)	41 (5)	48 (9)
Record low °F (°C)	25 (−4)	26 (−3)	25 (−4)	30 (−1)	35 (2)	37 (3)	38 (3)	40 (4)	40 (4)	32 (0)	28 (−2)	25 (−4)	25 (−4)
Average precipitation inches (mm)	3.7 (94)	5.0 (130)	2.7 (69)	0.8 (20)	0.3 (7.6)	0.1 (2.5)	0.0 (0.0)	0.0 (0.0)	0.2 (5.1)	0.7 (18)	1.4 (36)	2.5 (64)	17.4 (446.2)
Source: The Weather Channel.

=== Ecology ===
Mountain lions occasionally come down from the hills and wander through the city.

== Demographics ==
Historical population
Census	Pop.	Note	%±
1950	1,146		—
1960	2,902		153.2%
1970	3,380		16.5%
1980	4,030		19.2%
1990	25,494		532.6%
2000	31,415		23.2%
2010	34,421		9.6%
2020	36,284		5.4%
U.S. Decennial Census

=== 2020 census ===
As of the 2020 census, Moorpark had a population of 36,284. The population density was 2,955.4 inhabitants per square mile (1,141.1/km^{2}). The age distribution was 23.5% under the age of 18, 8.8% aged 18 to 24, 25.5% aged 25 to 44, 28.0% aged 45 to 64, and 14.3% who were 65 years of age or older. The median age was 39.3 years. For every 100 females, there were 96.2 males, and for every 100 females age 18 and over there were 95.1 males age 18 and over.

The census reported that 99.9% of the population lived in households, 0.1% lived in non-institutionalized group quarters, and no one was institutionalized. 98.0% of residents lived in urban areas, while 2.0% lived in rural areas.

There were 11,565 households in Moorpark, of which 39.8% had children under the age of 18 living in them. Of all households, 65.3% were married-couple households, 4.9% were cohabiting couple households, 11.1% were households with a male householder and no spouse or partner present, and 18.6% were households with a female householder and no spouse or partner present. About 13.5% of all households were made up of individuals, and 6.4% had someone living alone who was 65 years of age or older. The average household size was 3.14. There were 9,412 families (81.4% of all households).

There were 11,756 housing units at an average density of 957.6 units per square mile (369.7 units/km^{2}), of which 11,565 (98.4%) were occupied. Of occupied units, 75.9% were owner-occupied and 24.1% were occupied by renters. The homeowner vacancy rate was 0.3% and the rental vacancy rate was 3.0%.

Racial composition as of the 2020 census
Race	Number	Percent
White	20,980	57.8%
Black or African American	621	1.7%
American Indian and Alaska Native	366	1.0%
Asian	3,241	8.9%
Native Hawaiian and Other Pacific Islander	40	0.1%
Some other race	5,232	14.4%
Two or more races	5,804	16.0%
Hispanic or Latino (of any race)	12,061	33.2%

=== 2023 ACS 5-year estimates ===
In 2023, the US Census Bureau estimated that 18.8% of the population were foreign-born. Of all people aged 5 or older, 70.8% spoke only English at home, 21.2% spoke Spanish, 3.3% spoke other Indo-European languages, 3.4% spoke Asian or Pacific Islander languages, and 1.3% spoke other languages. Of those aged 25 or older, 90.6% were high school graduates and 44.9% had a bachelor's degree.

The median household income in 2023 was $149,403, and the per capita income was $54,538. About 3.4% of families and 4.5% of the population were below the poverty line.

=== 2010 census ===
The 2010 United States census reported that Moorpark had a population of 34,421. The population density was 2,689.4 inhabitants per square mile (1,038.4/km^{2}). The racial makeup of Moorpark was 25,860 (75.1%) White, 533 (1.5%) African American, 248 (0.7%) Native American, 2,352 (6.8%) Asian, 50 (0.1%) Pacific Islander, 3,727 (10.8%) from other races, and 1,651 (4.8%) from two or more races. Hispanic or Latino of any race were 10,813 persons (31.4%).

The Census reported that 34,421 people (100% of the population) lived in households, 0 (0%) lived in non-institutionalized group quarters, and 0 (0%) were institutionalized.

There were 10,484 households, out of which 4,863 (46.4%) had children under the age of 18 living in them, 6,966 (66.4%) were opposite-sex married couples living together, 1,113 (10.6%) had a female householder with no husband present, 507 (4.8%) had a male householder with no wife present. There were 483 (4.6%) unmarried opposite-sex partnerships, and 58 (0.6%) same-sex married couples or partnerships. 1,337 households (12.8%) were made up of individuals, and 434 (4.1%) had someone living alone who was 65 years of age or older. The average household size was 3.28. There were 8,586 families (81.9% of all households); the average family size was 3.55.

The population was spread out, with 9,459 people (27.5%) under the age of 18, 3,631 people (10.5%) aged 18 to 24, 8,825 people (25.6%) aged 25 to 44, 10,051 people (29.2%) aged 45 to 64, and 2,455 people (7.1%) who were 65 years of age or older. The median age was 34.7 years. For every 100 females, there were 98.6 males. For every 100 females age 18 and over, there were 97.1 males.

There were 10,738 housing units at an average density of 839.0 units per square mile (323.9 units/km^{2}), of which 8,182 (78.0%) were owner-occupied, and 2,302 (22.0%) were occupied by renters. The homeowner vacancy rate was 1.0%; the rental vacancy rate was 2.9%. 26,688 people (77.5% of the population) lived in owner-occupied housing units and 7,733 people (22.5%) lived in rental housing units.

== Economy ==
In 2017, Moorpark had 12,235 jobs (up from 10,820 jobs in 2010) and retail sales of $281 million (up from $264 million in 2010). Most of these retail businesses are located along the community's Los Angeles Avenue corridor, with the community's historic downtown area, known as Historic High Street, as a secondary retail hub.

Several businesses have been opened by celebrity chefs, including Fabio Viviani, a Top Chef "fan favorite," and Damiano Carrara, a third-place finisher on Food Network Star.

=== Top employers ===
According to the city's 2025 Annual Comprehensive Financial Report, the top employers in the city are:

#	Employer	# of Employees (2025)
1	Moorpark Unified School District	900
2	PennyMac Financial Services	794
3	Moorpark College	745
4	Ensign-Bickford Company	297
5	Pentair Water Pool & Spa	200
6	AeroVironment	200
7	Command Performance Catering Company	200
8	Target Stores	153
9	Laritech	150
10	Lifetech Resources	140

== Arts and culture ==
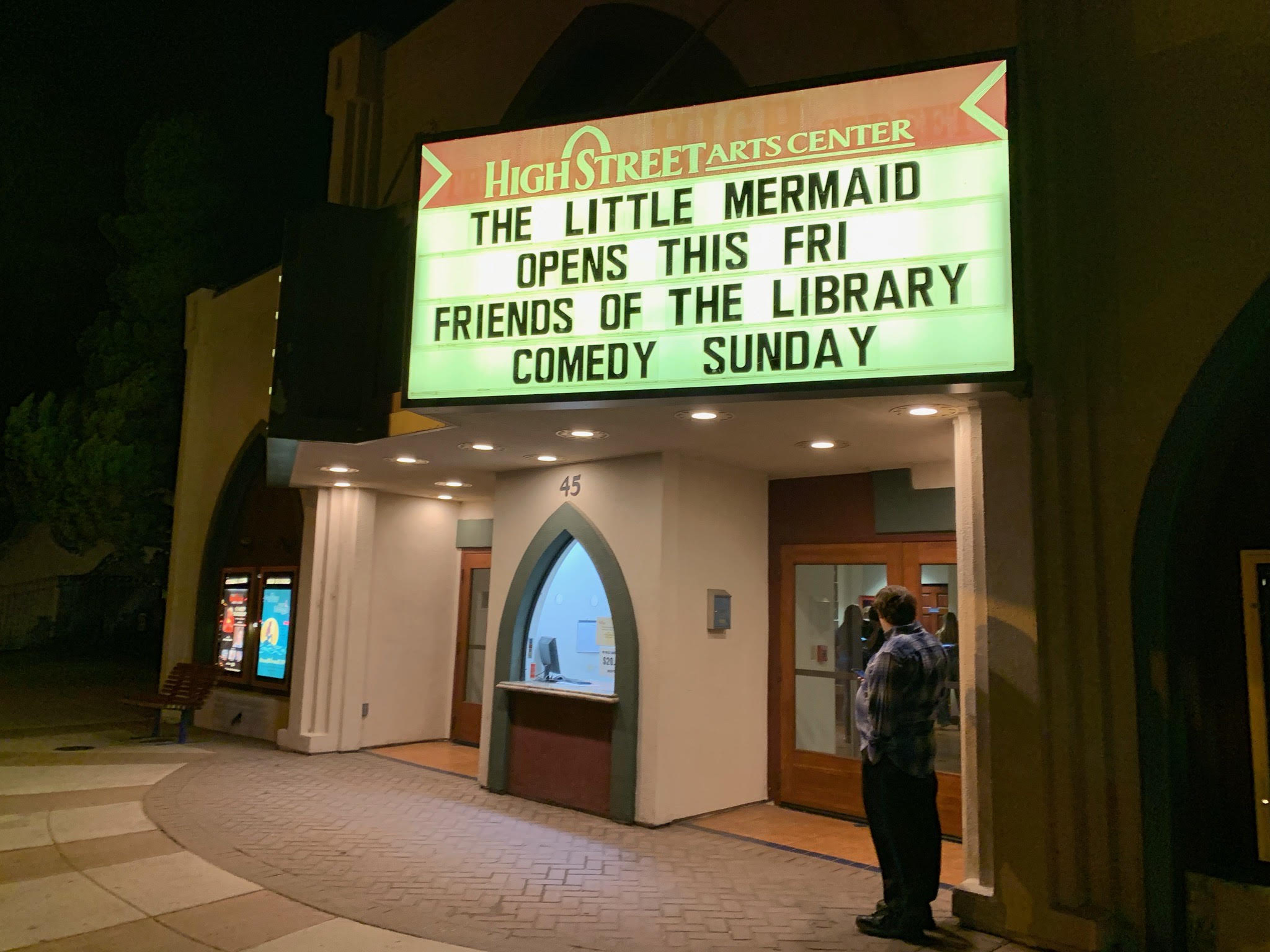
The High Street Arts Center, a theater in downtown Moorpark

A few events are held in the Moorpark area during the year, most notably Moorpark "Country Days", a single day parade and festival in late September or early October, an "Apricot Festival" in the spring, an annual fireworks celebration on the third of July every year, and the Moorpark Film Festival in late summer. The "Country Days" parade includes various vendors, entertainment, and family friendly games/crafts. Children march with their schools, sports teams, dance companies, etc. Local businesses are also encouraged to march. The July 3 fireworks are popular around the rest of Ventura County, as people can go to the Moorpark fireworks on the 3rd, and still see their own local city's fireworks on July 4.

The City of Moorpark established an "Arts in Public Places" (AIPP) program in 2005 and later created the Arts Commission in 2006 to support the AIPP efforts. In August 2019, Moorpark engaged the services of ArtsOC to develop an Arts Master Plan. While the initial role of the Arts Commission was to oversee the AIPP program, their role has expanded to include general oversight and implementation of the Arts Master Plan to engage, strengthen, and harness the visual and performing arts in Moorpark.

== Parks and recreation ==
=== Parks ===
Moorpark has 20 parks, all with a variety of amenities. Park hours for unlit facilities are from 6:00 a.m. to sunset. Lit facilities are from 6:00 a.m. to 10:00 p.m. The city's Dog Park is open from 7:00 a.m. to 5:00 p.m. PST, and 7:00 a.m. to 7:00 p.m. DST. The city's Skatepark is open from 10:00 a.m. to sunset on school days, and 8:00 a.m. to sunset on all other days.

Park facilities, including picnic pavilions, ball fields, soccer fields, and tennis courts can be reserved for private use.

1. Arroyo Vista Community Park
2. Campus Canyon
3. Campus Park
4. College View Park
5. Community Center Park
6. Country Trail Park
7. Dog Park
8. Glenwood Park
9. Magnolia Park
10. Mammoth Highlands Park
11. Miller Park
12. Monte Vista Nature Park
13. Mountain Meadows Park
14. Peach Hill Park
15. Poindexter Park
16. Tierra Rejada Park
17. Veterans Memorial Park
18. Villa Campesina Park
19. Virginia Colony Park
20. Walnut Acres Park

== Government and politics ==
The city government operates under a council-manager form of government. The Mayor is elected at-large for two-year terms, and four City Councilmembers are elected to staggered four-year terms. The Mayor and City Councilmember positions are non-partisan. Through 2018, the City Councilmembers were elected on an at-large basis. In April 2019, the City Council voted to transition to a district-based election system for the four City Councilmembers, beginning with the November 2020 municipal election. In the November 2020 election, Daniel Groff (District 2, Western Moorpark) and Dr. Antonio Castro (District 4, Downtown/Central Moorpark) became the first two Moorpark City Councilmembers elected to represent districts.

The city government operates municipal facilities throughout the community, including the Moorpark City Library, Moorpark Active Adult Center, Arroyo Vista Recreation Center and Community Park, Ruben Castro Human Services Facility, Moorpark Public Services Facility, and the Moorpark Police Services Center, which contains offices for the Ventura County Sheriff's Office and the California Highway Patrol. The Ventura County Fire Department provides fire protection for Moorpark, with two fire stations in the city.

In the California State Legislature, Moorpark is in the 27th Senate District, represented by Democrat Henry Stern, and in the 42nd Assembly District, represented by Democrat Jacqui Irwin. In the United States House of Representatives, Moorpark is represented by Democrat Julia Brownley in California's 26th congressional district.

As of December 2025, there were 24,139 registered voters in Moorpark, with 9,378 registered as Democrats (38.8%), 8,083 registered as Republicans (33.5%), 4,878 registered with no party preference (20.2%), and the remainder split among other parties.This compares to October 2020, when there were 23,290 registered voters in Moorpark, with 8,845 registered as Democrats (38.0%), 8,045 registered as Republicans (34.5%), 4,993 registered with no party preference (21.4%), and the remainder split among other parties.

== Education ==
Moorpark is served by Moorpark Unified School District, which includes Moorpark High School.

Additionally, there is The High School at Moorpark College, a high school located on the Moorpark College campus. In this program, students take English and Social Studies classes at the high school level and Math, Science, Foreign Language and other electives at Moorpark College to fulfill the requirements for graduation and the associate degree simultaneously.

=== Moorpark College ===
Moorpark is the home of Moorpark College, a public community college and part of the Ventura County Community College District. Moorpark College is ranked the highest among the California Community Colleges for degree completion. Moorpark College is also home to The Teaching Zoo at Moorpark College, the Charles Temple Observatory, and the Moorpark College Performing Arts Center, each used for classes and community events.

== Transportation ==
- The city is serviced by Amtrak California's Pacific Surfliner and by Metrolink's Ventura County Line commuter rail system with service to Los Angeles, with a train station located on High Street in the center of the city.
- The city of Moorpark has a mass transit bus system, known as the Moorpark City Transit. In April 2022, Moorpark City Transit launched the first public app-based rideshare service in Ventura County, MCT On Demand. By 2024, more people rode MCT On Demand vans than fixed-route buses. VCTC Intercity provides intercity bus services between Moorpark and the rest of Ventura County.

=== Major highways ===
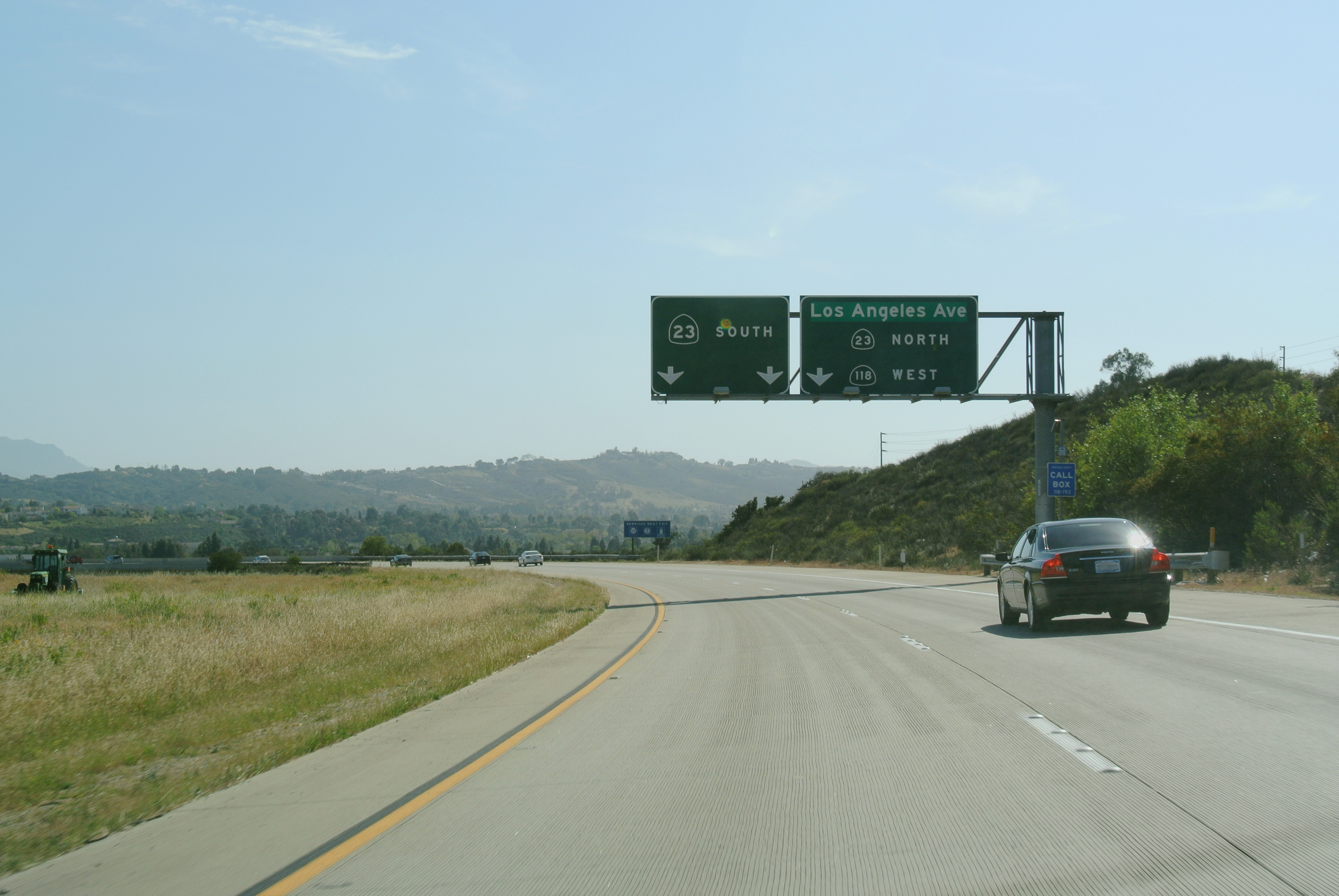
SR 118 just before the intersection with SR 23 in Moorpark

- California State Highway 118
- California State Highway 23

== Public safety ==
=== Law enforcement ===
The Ventura County Sheriff's Office provides law enforcement services for the city.

=== Crime ===
Moorpark had the lowest crime rates in Ventura County according to public crime statistics in 2000, and according to Ventura County Sheriff's Department statistics from 2006. The FBI has ranked Moorpark as one of California's safest cities. It was ranked California's 8th safest city in 2017. No homicides were recorded in 2017 nor 2018. The 2018 FBI Uniform Crime Report reported a near record-low crime level.

=== Volunteers in Policing ===
The City provides a "Volunteers in Policing" (VIP) program that formally engages citizens in supporting the police department and the community that began in 1994. In 1994 the program began with an attempt to open a police storefront run by the Volunteers in policing. Now the volunteers do a wide variety of non-dangerous tasks in an effort to assist the local sheriff's department including: parking enforcement, wellness checks, and traffic enforcement.

== In popular culture ==
A number of movies have been filmed in Moorpark. Kings Row (1942) starring Ronald Reagan featured a scene filmed at Spring Road and Los Angeles Avenue. The film Paranormal Activity 3 has a portion taking place in Moorpark. J.J. Gittes (Jack Nicholson) gets shot at an orchard in a scene in Chinatown (1974), which was shot at Trident Ranch. The big game scene in The Best of Times (1986) was shot at Moorpark Memorial High School, while scenes in The Great Man's Lady (1942) were filmed at Joel McCrea's ranch. Scenes from the TV series Super Soul Sunday starring Oprah Winfrey are filmed at Apricot Lane Farms. In 2018, the documentary The Biggest Little Farm was released, telling the story of Apricot Lane Farms. A special, "The Biggest Little Farm: The Return", was released in 2022. The Disney movie Magic Camp has scenes filmed in the High Street Arts Center on High Street.

In 2016, Mike Winters, the Vice President and Historian of the Moorpark Historical Society, published a revised history of Moorpark that covers the years from Moorpark's beginnings to the 1930s. The book, published by Arcadia Publishing is entitled Images of America: Moorpark.

== Notable people ==
- Brian Blechen, professional football player for the Carolina Panthers
- Kelli Berglund, actress
- Walter Brennan, screen actor
- John Chester, documentary filmmaker, TV director, and cinematographer
- Jan Ebeling, German-American equestrian, who competed at the 2012 Summer Olympics
- Sean Gilmartin, MLB pitcher
- Tim Hanshaw, former NFL player (1995 drafted in the 4th round by the San Francisco 49ers)
- Rick Jason, actor
- Drake London, wide receiver for the Atlanta Falcons
- Pierson Ohl, pitcher for the Colorado Rockies
- Zach Penprase (born 1985), Israeli-American baseball player for the Israel National Baseball Team
- Dennis Pitta, former professional football player
- Pretend, post-rock band
- Dillon "Attach" Price (born 1997), professional Call of Duty player
- Gary Sinise, actor
- Paul Winchell, ventriloquist, inventor, and the voice of Tigger.

== See also ==
- Chaparral Middle School (Moorpark)
- Mesa Verde Middle School (Moorpark)
