= Moorpark High School =

Location
- 4500 Tierra Rejada Road; Moorpark, California 93021; United States; 34°16′11″N 118°53′53″W

Information
- Former names: Moorpark Memorial Union High School, Moorpark Union High School
- Type: Public
- Motto: "All for One, One for All"
- Established: 1919
- Principal: Zaid Bakoo
- Teaching staff: 72.16 (FTE)
- Enrollment: 1,821 (2023–2024)
- Student to teacher ratio: 25.24
- Colors: Green and Gold
- Athletics conference: CIF Southern Section; Coastal Canyon League
- Nickname: Musketeers
- Website: mhs.mrpk.org

Moorpark High School is a comprehensive public secondary school located in the Mountain Meadows neighborhood of Moorpark, Ventura County, California, and serves students from grades 9 through 12. It is part of the Moorpark Unified School District; and had an enrollment of 1,908 students for the 2018–19 school year. The student/teacher ratio for 2017–18 was 23:1. Moorpark High School is accredited through the Western Association of Schools and Colleges. Moorpark High School takes pupils from two main feeder middle schools: Chaparral Middle School and Mesa Verde Middle School.

In addition to Moorpark, the school district it includes a portion of Santa Rosa Valley.

== History ==
The school was established in 1919 as Moorpark Memorial Union High School. The campus was originally located at 280 Casey Road (through the end of the 1987–1988 school year before being relocated to its current campus at 4500 Tierra Rejada Road). "Memorial" was included in the school name as a remembrance of servicemen lost during the First World War.

Moorpark High School has been noted for its performance in Academic Decathlon, winning the national championship four times with the latest in 2009.

== Notable alumni ==
- Kelli Berglund, actress
- Greg Estandia, Jacksonville Jaguars/Cleveland Browns tight end
- Sunny Hale (1968–2017), polo player for the Outback Polo Team; and first woman to win the U.S. Open.
- Chad Hansen, New York Jets wide receiver
- Drake London, Atlanta Falcons wide receiver
- Jonah Monheim, college football offensive lineman for the USC Trojans
- Zach Penprase (born 1985), Israeli-American baseball player for the Israel National Baseball Team
- Dennis Pitta, Baltimore Ravens tight end
- Grant Rohach, former American football quarterback
- Chastin West, Detroit Lions wide receiver
- Dan Winters, portrait photographer, illustrator, filmmaker and writer
