= Ventura County Fire Department =

Fire Department in California

Coordinates: 34.20911°N 119.07458°W

Operational area
- Country: United States
- State: California
- County: Ventura

Agency overview
- Established: May 11, 1928
- Annual calls: 47,272 (2020)
- Employees: 583 total (2020): 395 Safety personnel; 158 Non-safety personnel
- Annual budget: $126 million (2012)
- Staffing: Career
- Fire chief: Dustin Gardner
- EMS level: ALS
- Motto: Department logo

Facilities and equipment
- Battalions: 5
- Stations: 33
- Engines: 32 frontline 16 reserve
- Trucks: 3 frontline 2 reserve
- Quints: 1 frontline 1 reserve
- Squads: 2 frontline 2 reserve
- Rescues: 3 frontline 1 reserve
- Ambulances: ambulances are controlled by AMR
- Tenders: 2
- HAZMAT: 3
- USAR: 3
- Airport crash: 1
- Wildland: 11
- Bulldozers: 3 frontline 1 reserve
- Helicopters: 4
- Fireboats: 1
- Light and air: 2

Website
- Official website

The Ventura County Fire Department (VCFD) provides fire protection and emergency response services for the unincorporated areas of Ventura County, California, and for seven other cities within the county. Together, these areas compose the Ventura County Fire Protection District in the state of California, United States. The Ventura County Board of Supervisors is the fire district's board of directors. These five elected supervisors appoint the fire chief, and task him with providing fire protection services for the district.

In addition to the unincorporated areas of Ventura County, the department provides the following cities with service: Camarillo, Moorpark, Ojai, Port Hueneme, Santa Paula, Simi Valley, and Thousand Oaks.

== History ==
On May 11, 1928 the Ventura County Fire Protection District (VCFPD) was established. It wasn't for another two years that a 24-hour Fire Warden was placed on duty.

As the population of the county grew, the VCFD grew as well. In 1946 the department added radios to all of their trucks and rose to a total of 34 personnel. Nearly 33 years later in 1969, the department added a second radio frequency and added a full-time dispatch center at Station 31 in Thousand Oaks. Four years later in 1973, VCFD changed their engines from traditional Fire Engine Red to Yellow.

== Apparatus ==
=== Engine and medic engine ===
Ventura County uses two main types of engines. The first is the standard engine, also called a "triple-combination pumper" as it has a fire pump, water tank and fire hose. Each engine can deliver 1,500 GPM of water and carry 500 gallons of water. The engines also carry multiple ground ladders and different types of hose as well as various types of firefighting, rescue and medical equipment. The second type of engine is the Medic Engine, similar to a standard engine but with a fully trained Advanced Life Support (ALS) paramedic and additional equipment.

=== Medic rescue engine/rescue engine ===
In the Ventura County Fire Department, a rescue engine is a 2-piece company that is assigned a standard engine and rescue truck. These units always respond together as a single company. The rescue truck carries all of the same equipment that a truck company carries, such as vehicle extrication tools, forcible entry tools and ventilation tools giving the rescue engine truck company capabilities without the aerial device of a truck company.

Ventura County Fire Department has 3 rescue engines, 1 rescue is paired with a BLS engine making the company a Rescue Engine (27) and 2 of the rescues are paired with Medic Engines to make them Medic Rescue Engines (23 & 31).

Each of the Rescue Engines / Medic Rescue Engines serve as the truck company / support company for their geographical region.

These companies are used instead of a large ladder truck with an aerial device because of the type of area they serve, either due to the terrain, making it difficult to operate a large truck company, or a lack of multi-story buildings making an aerial device unnecessary.

=== Water tenders ===
Ventura county fire department has 2 water tenders currently in service, they are water tender 40 and water tender 27. These units are used on brush fires when there is no hydrants available for engines to refill there pumps. They are stationed at station 40 and 27. 27 is much newer than 40, with 40 being an old KME, and the most notable feature of 40 is that instead of being yellow, like most of the other units in the department, it is red.

=== Quints ===
Ventura county fire department currently has one quint frontline and the one in reserve. What sets these units apart from other truck companies is that they have a pump and carry water. These quints are quints 44 and 144, and are stationed at station 44 in wood ranch. Quint 44 is the one in frontline and is a 2015 rosenbauer commander tractor drawn Quiller (quint+tiller), and the reserve one being quint 144, an American Lafrance rear mount quint, another fun fact is that code3customs made a diecast model of quint 144 when it was rescue engine 40. 144 also served as rescue engine 40, then got the paramedic designation and then was quint 44, and is now in reserve as quint 144. These units respond to calls as if they were and engine and a truck.

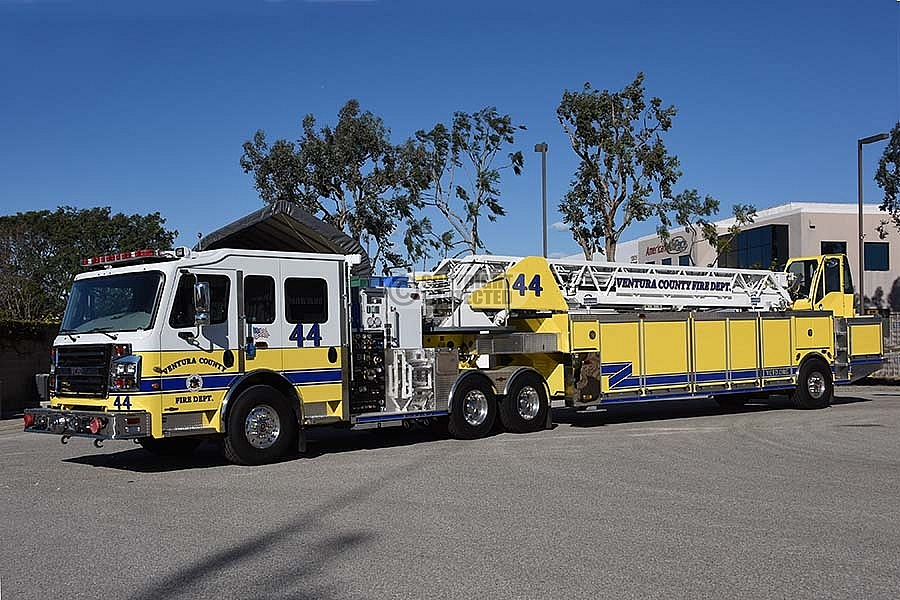
Quint 44, 2018 RosenBauer Tandem Axle TDA

In addition to the main engines, Ventura County also has reserve engines which are older engines kept as backups or for use on major incidents. Two of the department reserve engines are provided by the Office of Emergency Services.

=== Wildland fire engines ===
Ventura County has 11 Type 3 wildland fire engines for fighting bush fires; they are smaller and more mobile."

=== Helicopters ===
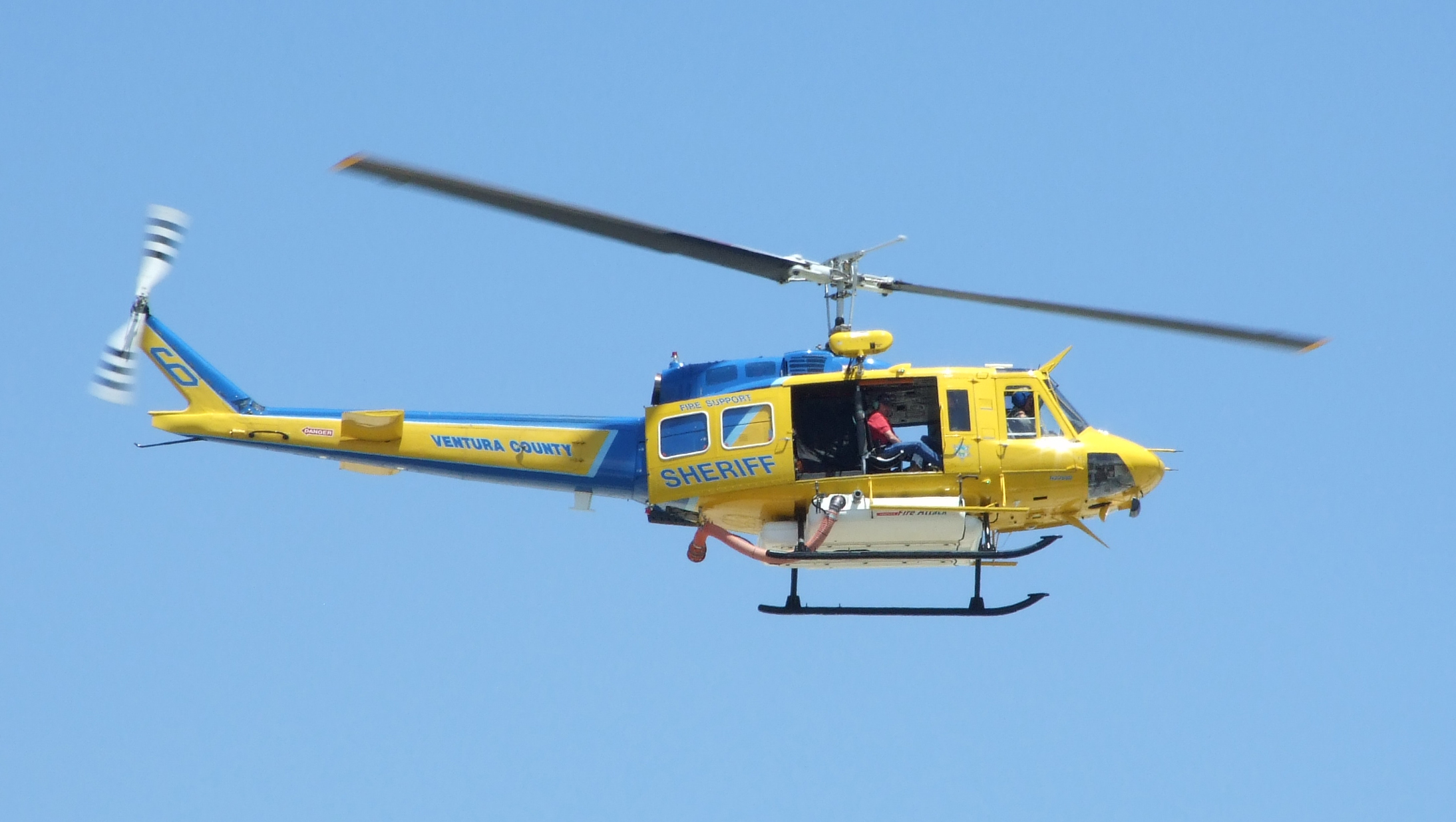
Air Unit Fire Support Bell HH-1H

Ventura County has four Helicopters shared by the VCFD and the Ventura County Sheriff's Department. The fleet of helicopters is made up of four different Bell UH-1 Hueys, one each of the HH-1H, UH-1H, Bell 205B and Bell 212. Each Huey can carry up to nine firefighters, can fly up to 100 miles per hour, and has a 375-gallon water tank. In September 2019 Ventura County incorporated three UH-60 helicopters for firefighting use. The surplus helicopters, obtained from the U.S. Army, are referred to as Firehawks and have been modified for crew transport, patient transport, and to carry water-dropping belly tanks. They provide increased speed (160 miles per hour) and water carrying capacity (1,000 gallons) over the existing fleet. In addition to fire fighting missions, the Hueys and Firehawks are used for search and rescue, emergency medical services, marijuana eradication and surveillance.

=== Aircraft Rescue and Firefighting Units (ARFF) ===
The Aircraft Rescue and Firefighting units, designed specifically for aircraft fires but used for other large-scale flammable liquid fires, can carry 1,500 gallons of water and are fitted with a pump capable of 1,250 GPM. Two hundred gallons of foam concentrate is also carried on board.

=== Dozers ===
To aid in fighting wildfires, VCFD has multiple bulldozers. Each dozer travels on tractor-trailers alongside a tender, for maintenance.

=== Fire boat ===
The VCFD has a 38-foot fireboat stationed at the Channel Islands Harbor. It is outfitted with a 1,000 GPM water cannon.

== Emergency operations ==
Bolded stations serve as quarters for the various Battalion chiefs in the VCFD. There are 5 Battalions in the department, each commanded by a Battalion Chief. Station 54 is the headquarters for the departments special operations.

=== Battalion 1 ===
Battalion 1 has its Headquarters at Fire Station 54. The Special operations activities are conducted at this station; their activities include fighting fires on ships and aircraft, dealing with hazardous materials, urban search and rescue and water rescues. Battalion 1 has Fire Stations 50,52,54 in Camarillo and Fire Station 57 in Somis.

station #	Equipment	Address	City	Nickname	Reference
50	Engine 50; Crash 50; Hazmat 50; Rescue Ambulance 50; Foam 50; Utility 50; Hazmat Officer; two decon trailers that are at the RTC	189 S. Las Posas Rd.	Camarillo	Camarillo Airport	
52	Medic Engine 52; Engine 152; squad 52	5353 Santa Rosa Rd.	Camarillo	Mission Oaks	
**54**	Battalion 1; Engine 54; Truck 54; USAR 154; USAR 54; USAR officer; OES swiftwater 10; OES swiftwater trailer; UTV 54; Water rescue trailer	2160 Pickwick Dr.	Camarillo	Camarillo	
55	Engine 55; Engine 155; Brush Engine 355	403 Valley Vista Dr.	Camarillo	Las Posas	
57	Engine 57; Brush Engine 357; Light & Air 57	3356 Somis Rd.	Somis	Somis	

=== Battalion 2 ===
Battalion 2 has its Headquarters at Fire Station 23. The Ojai Valley area as well as Santa Paula, Meiners Oaks, Oak View and Ventura are covered. Battalion 2 has Fire Station 20 in Santa Paula, Fire Station 21 in Ojai, Fire Station 22 in Meiners Oaks, Fire Station 23 in Oak view and Fire Station 25 in Ventura

station #	Equipment	Address	City	Nickname	Reference
20	Engine 20; Patrol 20	12000 Santa Paula-Ojai Rd.	Santa Paula	Summitt	
21	Medic Engine 21; Engine 121; Utility 21; Brush Engine 321	1201 E. Ojai Av.	Ojai	Ojai	
22	Engine 22; Brush Engine 322; Utility 22	466 S. La Luna Av.	Meiners Oaks	Meiners Oaks	
**23**	Medic rescue Engine 23; Battalion 2	15 Kunkle St.	Oak View	Oak View	
25	Engine 25; Engine 125; Water Rescue 25; OES Water Tender 12	5674 W. Pacific Coast Highway	Ventura	Rincon	

=== Battalion 3 ===
Battalion 3 has its Headquarters at Fire Station 30. Fire Stations 30,31,33,34 and 36 in Thousand Oaks, Fire Stations 32 and 35 in Newbury Park and Fire Station 36 in Oak Park are covered by Battalion 3.

station #	Equipment	Address	City	Nickname	Reference
**30**	Engine 30; Battalion 3; Brush Engine 330; Squad 30	325 W. Hillcrest Dr.	Thousand Oaks	Civic Center	
31	Medic Engine 31; Rescue 31; Rescue 131	151 N. Duesenberg Dr.	Thousand Oaks	Westlake	
32	Medic Engine 32; Engine 132; Utility 32	830 Reino Rd.	Newbury Park	Potrero	
33	Engine 33; Brush Engine 333; Patrol 33	33 Lake Sherwood Dr.	Thousand Oaks	Lake Sherwood	
34	Medic Engine 34; Engine 134; Utility 34; Day Engine 39 (once new station 34 is finished); ground support trailer	555 E. Avenida de Los Arboles	Thousand Oaks	Arboles	
35	Engine 35; Truck 35; Command 11; OES Reserve Engine 344	751 Mitchell Rd.	Newbury Park	Newbury Park	
36	Medic Engine 36; Engine 136; Utility 36	855 Deerhill Rd.	Oak Park	Oak Park	
37	Engine 37; Light & Air 37	2010 Upper Ranch Rd.	Thousand Oaks	North Ranch	

=== Battalion 4 ===
Battalion 4 has its Headquarters at Fire Station 41. Fire Stations 40 and 42 in Moorpark and Fire Stations 41,43,44,45,46 and 47 in Simi Valley are covered by Battalion 4..

station #	Equipment	Address	City	Nickname	Reference
40	Medic Engine 40; Engine 140; Water Tender 40; Utility 40; USAR 40; USAR cache trailer 1	4185 Cedar Springs St.	Moorpark	Mountain Meadows	
**41**	Engine 41; Truck 41; Battalion 4; Squad 41	1910 Church St.	Simi Valley	Church Street	
42	Engine 42; Engine 142; Brush Engine 342	295 E. High Street	Moorpark	Moorpark	
43	Medic Engine 43; Brush Engine 343; Patrol 16	5874 E. Los Angeles Av.	Simi Valley	Yosemite	
44	Quint 44; Quint 144; Truck 140	1050 Country Club Dr.	Simi Valley	Wood Ranch	
45	Engine 45; Engine 145; Dozer 14	790 Pacific Av.	Simi Valley	Pacific Street	
46	Engine 46; OES Engine 397	3265 Tapo St.	Simi Valley	Tapo Street	
47	Medic Engine 47; Truck 147; Utility 47	2901 Erringer Rd.	Simi Valley	Big Sky	

=== Battalion 5 ===
Battalion 5 has its Headquarters at Fire Station 51. Fire Stations 26 and 27 in Santa Paula, Fire Station 27 in Piru, Fire Station 51 in Oxnard, Fire Station 53 in Port Hueneme and Fire Station 56 in Malibu are covered by Battalion 5.

station #	Equipment	Address	City	Nickname	Reference
26	Engine 26; Squad 26; Engine 126	536 W. Main St.	Santa Paula	West Santa Paula	
27	Rescue Engine 27; Rescue 27; Water Tender 27; Dozer 12; Utility 27; Rescue 127	133 C St.	Fillmore	Fillmore	
28	Medic Engine 28; Brush Engine 328; Patrol 16	513 N. Church St.	Piru	Piru	
29	Engine 29; Brush Engine 329	114 S. 10th St.	Santa Paula	Santa Paula	
**51**	Engine 51; Battalion 5	3302 Turnout Park Cr.	Oxnard	El Rio	
53	Medic Engine 53; Water Rescue 53	304 N. Second St.	Port Hueneme	Port Hueneme	
56	Engine 56; Patrol 56; Engine 356	11855 Pacific Coast Highway	Malibu	Malibu	

== Organization ==
VCFD is under the auspices of the Ventura County Board of Supervisors, who appoint the Fire Chief. Reporting directly to the Fire Chief, the Deputy Fire Chief oversees the five bureaus within the department:

- Emergency Services Bureau
- Support Services Bureau
- Administrative Services Bureau
- Fire Prevention Bureau
- Business Services Bureau

=== Bureau of Emergency Services ===
This bureau provides fire suppression, emergency medical care, hazardous materials response, Urban search and rescue, swift water rescue, and the Fire Training Section. Under the command of an assistant chief, the bureau composes all fire stations within the department, as well as the Fire Training and Emergency Medical Services Sections.
