= Moorpark College =

Community college in Moorpark, California, US

- Motto: Bridge to the Future
- Type: Public community college
- Established: 1967; 59 years ago
- Parent institution: Ventura County Community College District
- Endowment: $99,410 (2011/2012)
- President: Julius O. Sokenu
- Faculty: 490
- Administrative staff: 159
- Students: 13,756
- Location: Moorpark, California, U.S. 34°18′00″N 118°50′06″W
- Campus: 150 acres (61 ha)
- Colors: Black and Columbia blue
- Nickname: Raiders
- Sporting affiliations: CCCAA – WSC, SCFA (football), SCWA (wrestling)
- Website: www.moorparkcollege.edu

Moorpark College is a public community college in Moorpark, California in the United States. It was established in 1967 with enrollment of 2,500 students, and enrolled 14,254 students in 2014.

== History ==
The board of the Ventura County Community College District established Moorpark College in 1967. In addition to the land already owned by the District, Moorpark College expanded into a 134-acre (54 ha) parcel of land on Moorpark's eastern boundary, donated by a local ranching family, the Strathearns.

In 1965, the citizens of Ventura County passed a bond for 8 million dollars to build the first part of the college. Construction of the administration, science, technology, gymnasium, and Maintenance buildings, and the Library and Campus Center began in 1966.

Moorpark College officially opened on September 11, 1967. The college's first president, John Collins, welcomed almost 1,400 students and 50 faculty members.

Robert Lombardi became the college's second president in 1971. During his tenure, enrollment doubled, and the college added emphasis on preparing students to transfer to four-year schools.

Ray Hearon is the longest-serving president, in office from 1974 to 1989. In 1980, the Moorpark College Foundation was formed to fund construction of an athletic stadium, amphitheater, and observatory. The 6,000-seat stadium, completed in 1985, was named after Paul Griffin Jr., a major benefactor. In 1987, the Charles Temple Observatory, the only public observatory in Ventura County, and Carlsberg Amphitheater were dedicated at the college's 20th anniversary celebration.

Nearby Oxnard College solicited Moorpark's help in establishing a Camarillo Center, located on California State University, Channel Islands's campus.

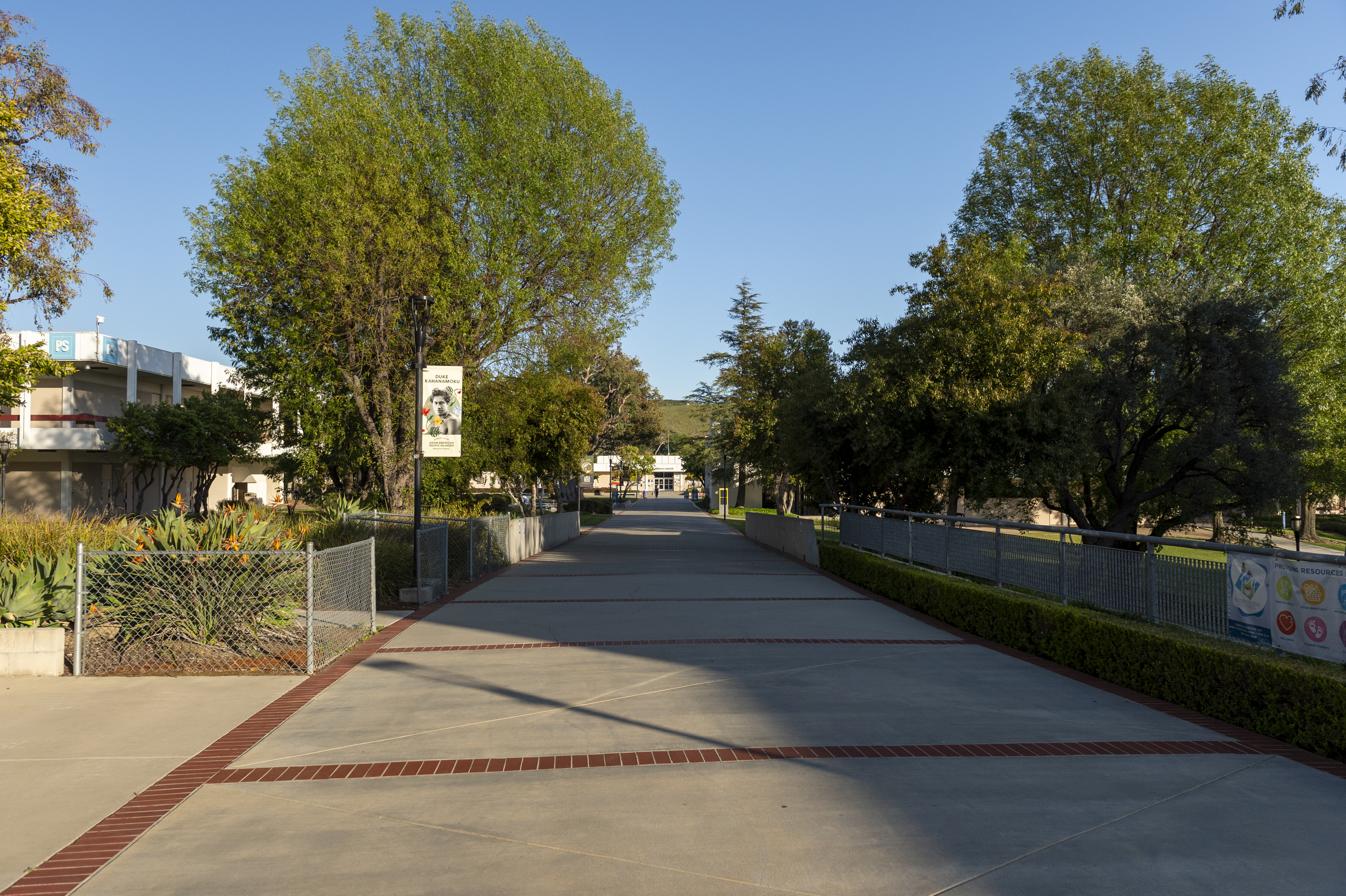
Raider Walk, looking eastward

In 2000, a high school for juniors and seniors opened on the college campus, The High School at Moorpark College (separate from Moorpark High School but part of the Moorpark Unified School District). The first class to graduate in 2001 numbered 25.

For the 2007 transferring cohort of eligible students (2,252), Moorpark College transferred 130 to a university in two years, 480 in three years, and 793 and four years.

In 1973, the college started an Exotic Animal Training and Management program. In 2011, the college broke ground on a new center for the program to house over 200 animals on campus.

Bernard Luskin was appointed interim president of Moorpark College in September 2013. Luis Pablo Sanchez was appointed for a term beginning February 3, 2015. After serving as interim president, Julius Sokenu was installed as president of the college on April 14, 2021.

== Athletics ==
Moorpark's athletic teams are nicknamed the Raiders. The college currently sponsors eight men's and eight women's varsity teams. The college competes as a member of the California Community College Athletic Association (CCCAA) in the Western State Conference (WSC) for all sports except football and wrestling, which compete in the Southern California Football Association (SCFA) and Southern California Wrestling Association (SCWA).

== Notable people ==
=== Faculty and staff ===
- Gene Berg – faculty chair and professor of chemistry
- Pam Eddinger – president; later president in the Massachusetts Community College System and of Bunker Hill Community College
- George Gabriel – audio engineering teacher; multi-instrumentalist and composer
- James Jarvaise – former artist in residence
- Sam Kane – former math instructor
- John Loprieno – theater arts instructor; former actor and writer
- Eric Marty – former assistant football coach
- Adam Mazarei – former assistant associate head basketball coach
- Peggy O'Neal – acting instructor, voice actress
- Ron Stillwell – former baseball coach
