= Ventura County Sheriff's Office =

County law enforcement agency in California, U.S.

Coordinates: 34.26941°N 119.20973°W

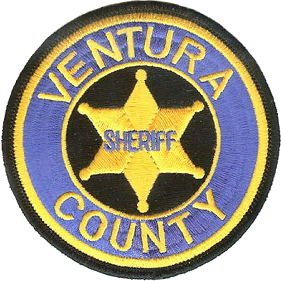
- Patch of the Ventura County Sheriff's Office (used since the 1940s)

- Seal of Ventura County

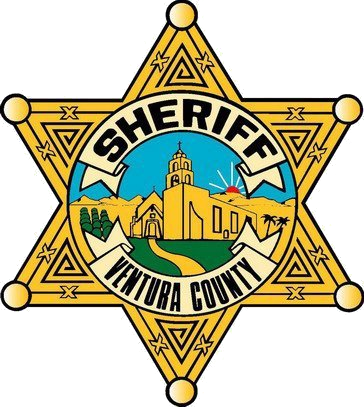
- Badge of the Sheriff of Ventura County
- Abbreviation: VCSO

Agency overview
- Formed: 1873; 153 years ago
- Employees: 1,300

Jurisdictional structure
- Operations jurisdiction: Ventura, California, U.S.
- Jurisdiction of Ventura County Sheriff's Office
- General nature: Local civilian police

Operational structure
- Deputies: 800
- Civilian employees: 500
- Elected officers responsible: Steve Bennett; Kathy Long; Peter C. Foy; John Zaragoza,
- Agency executives: James Fryhoff, Sheriff; John Reilly, Undersheriff

Facilities
- Stations: 6
- Jails: 3
- Policeboats: 2
- Helicopters: 7

Website
- sheriff.venturacounty.gov

The Ventura County Sheriff's Office (VCSO) is the principal law enforcement agency that serves Ventura County, California.

== Mission ==
The mission of the VCSO is stated by it to be: "We, the members of the Ventura County Sheriff's Office, are committed to safeguard the lives and property of the residents of Ventura County and respond to public concerns in a manner which promotes neighborhoods free from the fear of crime."

== History ==
The Office of the Sheriff for Ventura County began in February 1873, with the election of Sheriff Frank Peterson. What began as a duty to collect taxes and catch horse thieves has evolved significantly as the county has changed and grown. Seventeen other Sheriffs have held the Office of the Sheriff since 1873. The administration of justice (and more criminals going to trial rather than the dispensing of "frontier justice") became more sophisticated during the late 19th century. Sheriff Edmund Guy McMartin, who was elected Sheriff five times, was the first and only Sheriff killed in the line of duty while apprehending a murder suspect in 1921.

Public hangings and bootlegging arrests gave way to police practices and procedures commonly recognized today. The modern era of Ventura County law enforcement began in 1959 with Sheriff William Hill. The 1970s saw the genesis of community involvement programs like Community Orientated Policing and Problem Solving (COPPS), DARE and Neighborhood Watch. Today, the cornerstone of county policing is the partnership between the Sheriff's Office and county residents.

=== 1920s ===
Sheriff Edmund Guy McMartin died on August 20, 1921, when he and Oxnard Township Constable W.E. Kelley were killed in the line of duty while attempting to arrest a murder suspect.

=== 1950s ===
Deputy Donald Gregory was killed instantly on September 9, 1951, when the patrol car his partner was driving hit a telephone pole. An unidentified wrong way driver caused the collision on Highway 118 near Simi Valley.

=== 1960s ===
Reserve (Auxiliary) Deputy Bryce Patten was shot and killed on August 19, 1960, while working a roadblock on Casitas Pass Road. The suspects in a $150 liquor store robbery shot Patten to avoid being caught. The three suspects were caught in Bakersfield six days later and prosecuted.

Deputy Earl Mendenhall died on June 15, 1961, from injuries received in a traffic collision when the mentally ill prisoner Mendenhall was transporting grabbed the steering wheel and directed the car into oncoming traffic.

Deputy Chester "Chico" Larson drowned on January 20, 1969, while attempting to rescue a group of hikers at Sespe Creek. Chico was stranded in a stalled rescue tractor in the middle of the river and was washed off the top of the tractor with 10 other victims. There was one survivor.

=== 1970s ===
Detective Donald E. Haynie was shot and killed June 5, 1970, while attempting to make a narcotics arrest in Fillmore. Haynie and three other plainclothes sheriff's narcotics agents entered the house of a suspected drug dealer. The suspect's 78-year-old father shot Haynie once in the chest. The shooting was determined to be a misunderstanding, and the father was released. Donald served as a military policeman in the Army.

In October 1973, Lieutenant Harvey A. "Hank" Varat, a 14-year law enforcement veteran, was on a search and rescue training exercise in the Santa Susanna Mountains when he was bit by a tick and infected with Rocky Mountain spotted fever. He died four days later on October 20, 1973, from the fever. Varat helped develop the SWAT team, Deep-Sea Diving Team, and the search and rescue team.

Sergeant Tom Collins died on October 25, 1975, when the helicopter he was flying crashed into the Santa Clara riverbed. Tom started the helicopter unit for the Ventura County Sheriff's Office in 1971.

=== 1990s ===
Deputy Peter Aguirre was shot and killed on July 17, 1996, while responding to a domestic call in the City of Ojai. The suspect was also shot, but survived and was prosecuted.

Senior Deputy Lisa Whitney was killed on August 12, 1998, in a traffic accident when a driver failed to stop at an inoperative traffic light in Ventura.

=== 2000s ===
Deputy Robert D. Bornet, a 10-year veteran of the Ventura County Sheriff's Office, was killed on November 6, 2006, in a traffic accident while attempting to stop a motorist for a vehicle code violation. Bornet was in uniform and driving in his personal vehicle when the accident occurred.

=== 2010s ===
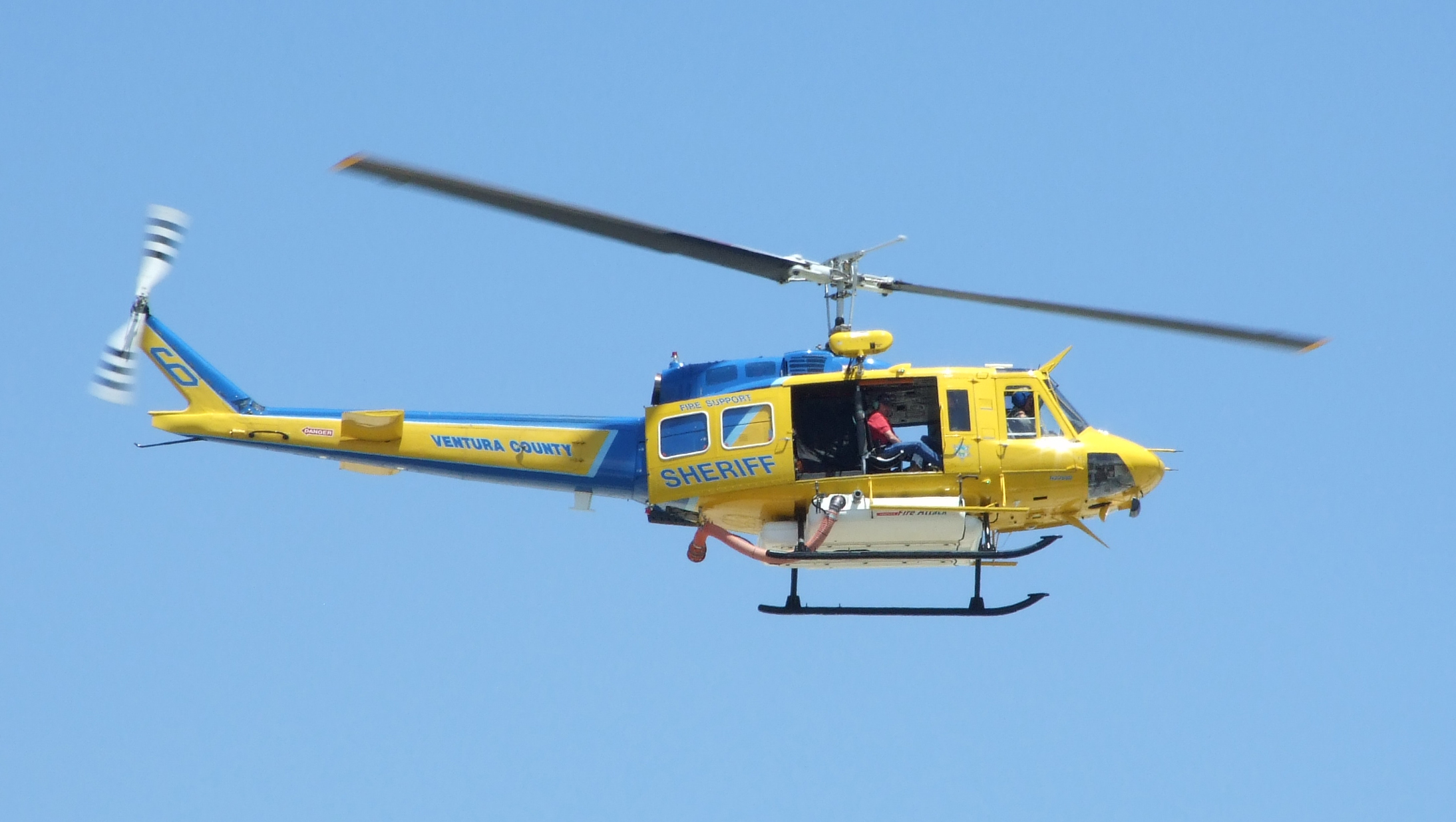
A VCSD Air Unit Fire Support Bell HH-1H in the early 2010s

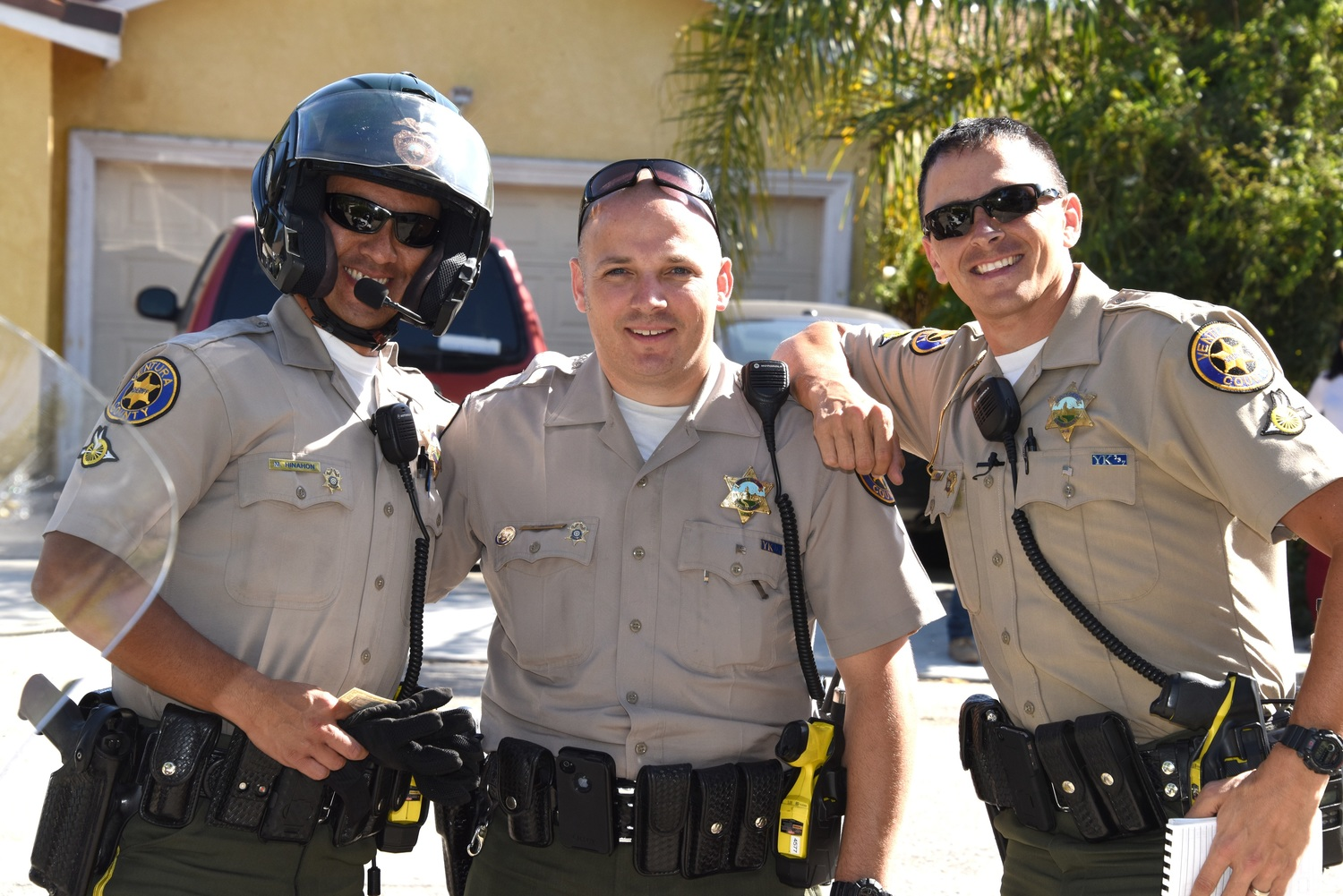
VCSO deputies in the mid-2010s

Deputy Eugene Kostiuchenko, an 11-year veteran, was killed on October 28, 2014, while concluding a traffic stop on the 101 freeway at the Lewis Road off-ramp, in the Californian city of Camarillo. At approximately 1:15 am, Deputy Kostiuchenko was returning to his marked patrol vehicle when a second vehicle, driven by 25-year-old Kevin Hogrefe, struck the deputy, causing fatal injuries. Kevin Hogrefe, an alleged drunk driver, left the scene of the accident and was captured by additional deputies approximately 2 miles away at the Las Posas Road off ramp, after Hogrefe collided with a second vehicle, disabling his own.

Sergeant Ron Helus, a 29-year veteran of the VC Sheriff's Office, died on November 7, 2018, after he was shot while being the first law enforcement officer to engage an active shooter at the Borderline Bar & Grill in Thousand Oaks on the night of November 7, 2018, at approximately 11:25 pm. 11 other people were killed by the shooter.

Search and Rescue Team Member Jeffrey Dye died on February 2, 2019, when he was struck by a vehicle on the center median of the I-5 Freeway near Gorman while trying to rescue victims from a previous unrelated car accident.

== Organization ==
The sheriff is elected in the county general elections, and he subsequently appoints his three Assistant Sheriffs. The Assistant Sheriffs manage specific "services," or divisions, within the department.

- One Assistant Sheriff manages Operations and is responsible for the patrol deputies, and has four commanders. They also are responsible for Special Services, a varied division that includes the Air Unit, Major Crimes, Narcotics, Intelligence, Bomb Unit, SWAT, Hostage Negotiations, Forensic Sciences Laboratory, Information Systems, and Evidence Unit. There are two commanders assigned to head these units.
- One Assistant Sheriff They also manage Support Services which includes records, human resources, internal affairs, and training academy units. There are two commanders subordinate to the Chief Deputy of Support Services.
- One Assistant Sheriff manages the Detention Services oversees the jails and courts within the county, and has three supervising commanders.

=== Equipment ===
The standard issued handgun was the SIG Sauer P226 .40 S&W. In 2020 it is being phased out for the SIG Sauer P320 9mm with the XCarry grip and a SIG Sauer red dot optic installed. Ammunition Speer Gold Dot 9mm 147gr JHP.

As of September 2020 the Ventura County Sheriffs Department uses the Chevrolet Tahoe PPV as their primary patrol vehicle.

The Ventura County Sheriff’s Aviation Unit began in 1971. In 2009, the Ventura County Fire District entered into a cooperative agreement in which the Aviation Unit became a joint venture between the Fire District and Sheriff’s Office. The Fire District contributes funding and staff to the operation. The unit has grown from one Bell 47 to the current fleet of four Bell UH-1 helicopters, three Sikorsky UH-60 Blackhawk helicopters (soon two to be converted to the Firehawk helicopter), and one Bell Long Ranger. This unit is the only public safety aviation unit in the county and provides support for all local and state law enforcement and fire service agencies in the county. The missions vary between law enforcement, search and rescue (SAR), emergency medical services (EMS) and fire suppression missions.

=== Ranks ===
The Ventura County Sheriff's Office's rank structure is as follows:

Title	Insignia
Sheriff	
Undersheriff	
Assistant Sheriff	
Commander	
Captain	
Sergeant	
Senior Deputy	
Deputy Sheriff	
Deputy Sheriff Trainee

Senior Deputy insignia is 2 chevrons the same color as Sergeants

== In popular culture ==
- George Anson Phillips, a character in Raymond Chandler's The High Window. Phillips was an inept former deputy turned private investigator, vaguely remembered by the protagonist Marlowe.
- In the 1974 film Chinatown, Roy Jenson plays Claude Mulvihill, a hired tough guy and former Ventura County Sheriff who had been on the take from rum runners during Prohibition.
- The 2005 film Hostage portrays the Ventura County Sheriff's Office's SWAT team taking over a hostage situation from the fictional Bristo Camino Police Department.
- In the second season of HBO's True Detective: Rachel McAdams portrays Detective Ani Bezzerides, who works for the Ventura County Sheriff's CID.

== See also ==
- List of law enforcement agencies in California
