= 2023 Penn State Nittany Lions football team =

American college football season

2023 Penn State Nittany Lions football

Lambert-Meadowlands Trophy

Peach Bowl, L 25–38 vs. Ole Miss
- Conference: Big Ten Conference
- East Division

Ranking
- Coaches: No. 13
- AP: No. 13
- Record: 10–3 (7–2 Big Ten)
- Head coach: James Franklin (10th season)
- Offensive coordinator: Mike Yurcich (3rd season; first ten games)
- Co-offensive coordinators: Ja'Juan Seider (interim; remainder of season); Ty Howle (interim; remainder of season)
- Offensive scheme: Spread
- Defensive coordinator: Manny Diaz (2nd season)
- Co-defensive coordinator: Anthony Poindexter (3rd season)
- Base defense: 4–3
- Captains: Dominic DeLuca; Keaton Ellis; Olu Fashanu; Adisa Isaac; Theo Johnson; Malick Meiga
- Home stadium: Beaver Stadium

Uniform
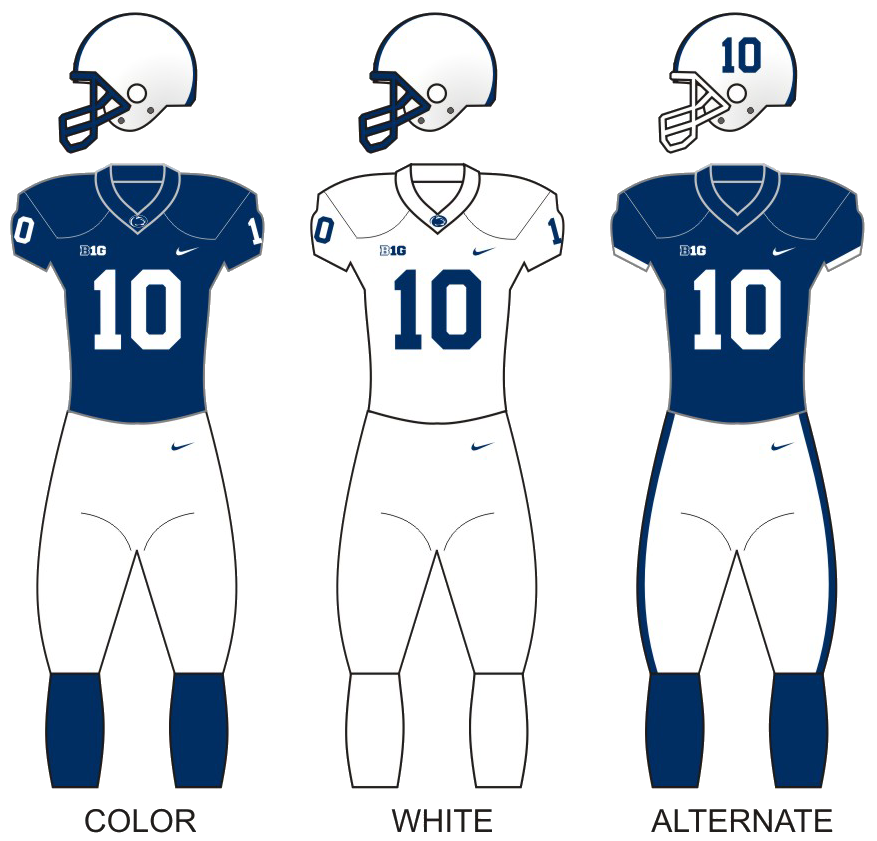

2023 Big Ten Conference football standings
	Conf.			Overall
Team	W		L	W		L
East Division
No. 1 Michigan xy$#^	9	–	0	15	–	0
No. 10 Ohio State	8	–	1	11	–	2
No. 13 Penn State	7	–	2	10	–	3
Maryland	4	–	5	8	–	5
Rutgers	3	–	6	7	–	6
Indiana	1	–	8	3	–	9
Michigan State†	0	–	7	0	–	8
West Division
No. 24 Iowa xy	7	–	2	10	–	4
Northwestern	5	–	4	8	–	5
Wisconsin	5	–	4	7	–	6
Minnesota	3	–	6	6	–	7
Illinois	3	–	6	5	–	7
Nebraska	3	–	6	5	–	7
Purdue	3	–	6	4	–	8
Championship: Michigan 26, Iowa 0
# – College Football Playoff champion; ^ – College Football Playoff participant; $ – Conference champion; x – Division champion/co-champions; y – Championship game participant; † — NCAA vacated all wins for Michigan State (4–8, 2–7); Rankings from AP Poll

The 2023 Penn State Nittany Lions football team represented Pennsylvania State University as a member of the East Division Big Ten Conference during the 2023 NCAA Division I FBS football season. Led by tenth-year head coach James Franklin, the Nittany Lions compiled an overall record of 10–3 with a mark of 7–2 in conference play, placing third in the Big Ten's East Division. Penn State was invited to the Peach Bowl, where the Nittany Lions lost to Ole Miss. The team played home games at Beaver Stadium in University Park, Pennsylvania.

== Offseason ==
=== Players drafted into the NFL ===
Round	Pick	Player	Position	NFL club
2	32	Joey Porter Jr.	CB	Pittsburgh Steelers
2	61	Brenton Strange	TE	Jacksonville Jaguars
2	62	Juice Scruggs	C	Houston Texans
3	87	Ji'Ayir Brown	S	San Francisco 49ers
5	149	Sean Clifford	QB	Green Bay Packers
6	185	Parker Washington	WR	Jacksonville Jaguars

=== Transfers ===
==== Outgoing ====
Player	Position	Destination
Fatorma Mulbah	DT	West Virginia
Cody Romano	LB	Lock Haven
Jamari Buddin	LB	New Mexico State
Keyvone Lee	RB	Mississippi State
Marquis Wilson	CB	Purdue
Jaden Dottin	WR	Toledo
Jimmy Christ	OT	Virginia
Bobby Walchak	LB	Campbell
Devyn Ford	RB	Notre Dame

==== Incoming ====
Player	Position	Transferred From
Dante Cephas	WR	Kent State
Malik McClain	WR	Florida State
Trey Potts	RB	Minnesota
Alonzo Ford	DT	Old Dominion

== Schedule ==
Date	Time	Opponent	Rank	Site	TV	Result	Attendance
September 2	7:30 p.m.	West Virginia*	No. 7	Beaver Stadium; University Park, PA (rivalry)	NBC	W 38–15	110,747
September 9	12:00 p.m.	No. 19 (FCS) Delaware*	No. 7	Beaver Stadium; University Park, PA	Peacock	W 63–7	108,575
September 16	12:00 p.m.	at Illinois	No. 7	Memorial Stadium; Champaign, IL	FOX	W 30–13	49,099
September 23	7:30 p.m.	No. 24 Iowa	No. 7	Beaver Stadium; University Park, PA (White Out)	CBS	W 31–0	110,830
September 30	12:00 p.m.	at Northwestern	No. 6	Ryan Field; Evanston, IL	BTN	W 41–13	25,064
October 14	3:30 p.m.	UMass*^{†}	No. 6	Beaver Stadium; University Park, PA	BTN	W 63–0	105,533
October 21	12:00 p.m.	at No. 3 Ohio State	No. 7	Ohio Stadium; Columbus, OH (College GameDay, Big Noon Kickoff, rivalry)	FOX	L 12–20	105,506
October 28	12:00 p.m.	Indiana	No. 10	Beaver Stadium; University Park, PA	CBS	W 33–24	107,209
November 4	3:30 p.m.	at Maryland	No. 11	SECU Stadium; College Park, MD (rivalry)	FOX	W 51–15	51,802
November 11	12:00 p.m.	No. 3 Michigan	No. 10	Beaver Stadium; University Park, PA (rivalry)	FOX	L 15–24	110,856
November 18	12:00 p.m.	Rutgers	No. 12	Beaver Stadium; University Park, PA	FS1	W 27–6	105,114
November 24	7:30 p.m.	vs. Michigan State	No. 11	Ford Field; Detroit, MI (rivalry)	NBC	W 42–0	51,927
December 30	12:00 p.m.	vs. No. 11 Ole Miss*	No. 10	Mercedes-Benz Stadium; Atlanta, GA (Peach Bowl)	ESPN	L 25–38	71,230
*Non-conference game; ^{†}Homecoming; Rankings from AP Poll (and CFP Rankings, after October 31) - Released prior to game; All times are in Eastern time

== Game summaries ==
=== West Virginia ===
West Virginia at No. 7 Penn State – Game summary

Quarter	1	2	3	4	Total
West Virginia	0	7	0	8	15
No. 7 Penn State	7	7	7	17	38

at Beaver Stadium, University Park, Pennsylvania

- Date: September 2
- Game time: 7:30 p.m. EDT
- Game weather: 77 °F (25 °C), mostly sunny
- Game attendance: 110,747
- Referee: Mark Kluczynski
- TV announcers (NBC): Noah Eagle, Todd Blackledge, and Kathryn Tappen
- ESPN box score, GoPSUsports.com box score

Game information

First quarter

- PSU – KeAndre Lambert-Smith, 72-yard TD pass from Drew Allar, Sander Sahaydak kick, 10:13 (PSU 7–0)

Second quarter

- WVU – CJ Donaldson Jr., 1-yard TD run, Michael Hayes kick, 14:14 (TIE 7–7)
- PSU – Nicholas Singleton, 2-yard TD run, Sahaydak kick, 9:10 (PSU 14–7)

Third quarter

- PSU – Lambert-Smith, 12-yard TD pass from Allar, Alex Felkins kick, 8:36 (PSU 21–7)

Fourth quarter

- PSU – Felkins, 25-yard field goal, 14:47 (PSU 24–7)
- PSU – Malik McClain, 25-yard TD pass from Allar, Felkins kick, 7:32 (PSU 31–7)
- WVU – Garrett Greene, 1-yard TD run, Donaldson pass from Greene for 2-point conversion, 3:34 (PSU 31–15)
- PSU – Beau Pribula, 5-yard TD run, Felkins kick, 0:06 (PSU 38–15)

Statistics	WVU	PSU
First downs	17	27
Plays–yards	67–308	65–478
Rushes–yards	40–146	35–146
Passing yards	162	332
Passing: comp–att–int	16–27–0	22–30–0
Turnovers		
Time of possession	31:16	28:44

Team	Category	Player	Statistics
West Virginia	Passing	Garrett Greene	16/27, 162 yards
West Virginia	Rushing	CJ Donaldson Jr.	18 carries, 81 yards, TD
West Virginia	Receiving	Devin Carter	6 receptions, 90 yards
Penn State	Passing	Drew Allar	21/29, 325 yards, 3 TD
Penn State	Rushing	Nicholas Singleton	13 carries, 70 yards, TD
Penn State	Receiving	KeAndre Lambert-Smith	4 receptions, 123 yards, 2 TD

=== No. 19 Delaware (FCS) ===
No. 19 Delaware (FCS) at No. 7 Penn State – Game summary

Quarter	1	2	3	4	Total
No. 19 Delaware (FCS)	7	0	0	0	7
No. 7 Penn State	14	21	21	7	63

at Beaver Stadium, University Park, Pennsylvania

- Date: September 9
- Game time: 12:00 p.m. EDT
- Game weather: 80 °F (27 °C); cloudy
- Game attendance: 108,575
- Referee: Bryan Banks
- TV announcers (Peacock): Brendan Burke, Michael Robinson, and Zora Stephenson
- ESPN box score, GoPSUsports.com box score

Game information

First quarter

- PSU – Nicholas Singleton, 2-yard TD run, Alex Felkins kick, 8:19 (PSU 7–0)
- PSU – Kaytron Allen, 4-yard TD run, Felkins kick, 2:16 (PSU 14–0)
- UD – Marcus Yarns, 66-yard TD run, Alex Schmoke kick, 1:05 (PSU 14–7)

Second quarter

- PSU – Singleton, 5-yard TD run, Felkins kick, 11:50 (PSU 21–7)
- PSU – Singleton, 5-yard TD run, Felkins kick, 4:36 (PSU 28–7)
- PSU – Tyler Warren, 2-yard TD pass from Drew Allar, Felkins kick, 0:22 (PSU 35–7)

Third quarter

- PSU – Allar, 1-yard TD run, Sander Sahaydak kick, 9:48 (PSU 42–7)
- PSU – Beau Pribula, 6-yard TD run, Felkins kick, 7:16 (PSU 49–7)
- PSU – Dominic DeLuca, 26-yard interception return for TD, Felkins kick, 2:43 (PSU 56–7)

Fourth quarter

- PSU – Omari Evans, 4-yard TD pass from Pribula, Felkins kick, 7:35 (PSU 63–7)

Statistics	UD	PSU
First downs	5	34
Plays–yards	41–140	91–541
Rushes–yards	24–82	60–315
Passing yards	58	226
Passing: comp–att–int	6–17–1	25–31–0
Turnovers		
Time of possession	17:38	42:22

Team	Category	Player	Statistics
Delaware	Passing	Zach Marker	3/7, 37 yards, INT
Delaware	Rushing	Marcus Yarns	6 carries, 86 yards, TD
Delaware	Receiving	Jojo Bermudez	2 receptions, 32 yards
Penn State	Passing	Drew Allar	22/26, 204 yards, TD
Penn State	Rushing	Kaytron Allen	19 carries, 103 yards, TD
Penn State	Receiving	KeAndre Lambert-Smith	6 receptions, 74 yards

=== At Illinois ===
No. 7 Penn State at Illinois – Game summary

Quarter	1	2	3	4	Total
No. 7 Penn State	6	10	7	7	30
Illinois	0	7	0	6	13

at Memorial Stadium, Champaign, Illinois

- Date: September 16
- Game time: 12:00 p.m. EDT
- Game weather: 78 °F (26 °C); mostly cloudy
- Game attendance: 49,099
- Referee: Jerry McGinn
- TV announcers (FOX): Gus Johnson, Joel Klatt, and Jenny Taft
- ESPN box score, GoPSUsports.com box score

Game information

First quarter

- PSU – Alex Felkins, 20-yard field goal, 5:27 (PSU 30)
- PSU – Felkins, 45-yard field goal, 1:43 (PSU 6–0)

Second quarter

- PSU – Kaytron Allen, 4-yard TD run, Felkins kick, 11:04 (PSU 13–0)
- UI – Reggie Love III, 5-yard TD run, Caleb Griffin kick, 2:08 (PSU 13–7)
- PSU – Felkins, 28-yard field goal, 0:00 (PSU 16–7)

Third quarter

- PSU – Tyler Warren, 11-yard TD pass from Trey Potts, Felkins kick, 2:14 (PSU 23–7)

Fourth quarter

- PSU – Nicholas Singleton, 16-yard TD run, Felkins kick, 14:24 (PSU 30–7)
- UI – Malik Elzy, 19-yard TD pass from John Paddock, 2-point conversion failed, 4:21 (PSU 30–13)

Statistics	PSU	UI
First downs	20	20
Plays–yards	77–383	73–354
Rushes–yards	40–164	29–62
Passing yards	219	292
Passing: comp–att–int	17–37–0	25–44–4
Turnovers		
Time of possession	31:52	28:08

Team	Category	Player	Statistics
Penn State	Passing	Drew Allar	16/33, 208 yards
Penn State	Rushing	Kaytron Allen	13 carries, 54 yards, TD
Penn State	Receiving	Nicholas Singleton	3 receptions, 49 yards
Illinois	Passing	Luke Altmyer	15/28, 163 yards, 4 INT
Illinois	Rushing	Reggie Love III	12 carries, 55 yards, TD
Illinois	Receiving	Isaiah Williams	5 receptions, 63 yards

=== No. 24 Iowa ===
No. 24 Iowa at No. 7 Penn State – Game summary

Quarter	1	2	3	4	Total
No. 24 Iowa	0	0	0	0	0
No. 7 Penn State	3	7	14	7	31

at Beaver Stadium, University Park, Pennsylvania

- Date: September 23
- Game time: 7:30 p.m. EDT
- Game weather: 54 °F (12 °C); rain
- Game attendance: 110,830
- Referee: Chris Coyle
- TV announcers (CBS): Brad Nessler, Gary Danielson, and Jenny Dell
- ESPN box score, GoPSUsports.com box score

Game information

First quarter

- PSU – Alex Felkins, 46-yard field goal, 1:35 (PSU 3–0)

Second quarter

- PSU – Khalil Dinkins, 9-yard TD pass from Drew Allar, Felkins kick, 9:17 (PSU 10–0)

Third quarter

- PSU – Tyler Warren, 2-yard TD pass from Allar, Felkins kick, 8:20 (PSU 17–0)
- PSU – Warren, 7-yard TD pass from Allar, Felkins kick, 1:01 (PSU 24–0)

Fourth quarter

- PSU – KeAndre Lambert-Smith, 3-yard TD pass from Allar, Felkins kick, 12:19 (PSU 31–0)

Statistics	UI	PSU
First downs	4	28
Plays–yards	33–76	97–397
Rushes–yards	17–20	57–215
Passing yards	56	182
Passing: comp–att–int	6–16–0	26–40–0
Turnovers		
Time of possession	14:33	45:27

Team	Category	Player	Statistics
Iowa	Passing	Cade McNamara	5/14, 42 yards
Iowa	Rushing	Kamari Moulton	6 carries, 18 yards
Iowa	Receiving	Erick All	3 receptions, 35 yards
Penn State	Passing	Drew Allar	25/37, 166 yards, 4 TD
Penn State	Rushing	Kaytron Allen	21 carries, 72 yards
Penn State	Receiving	KeAndre Lambert-Smith	8 receptions, 66 yards, TD

=== At Northwestern ===
No. 6 Penn State at Northwestern – Game summary

Quarter	1	2	3	4	Total
No. 6 Penn State	3	7	17	14	41
Northwestern	3	7	0	3	13

at Ryan Field, Evanston, Illinois

- Date: September 30
- Game time: 12:00 p.m. EDT
- Game weather: 73 °F (23 °C); sunny
- Game attendance: 25,064
- Referee: Larry Smith
- TV announcers (BTN): Mark Followill, Jake Butt, and Brooke Fletcher
- ESPN box score, GoPSUsports box score

Game information

First quarter

- NU – Jack Olsen, 33-yard field goal, 12:47 (NU 3–0)
- PSU – Alex Felkins, 20-yard field goal, 2:37 (TIE 3–3)

Second quarter

- NU – Ben Bryant, 1-yard TD run, Olsen kick, 5:46 (NU 10–3)
- PSU – Trey Potts, 13-yard TD run, Felkins kick, 1:16 (TIE 10–10)

Third quarter

- PSU – Drew Allar, 1-yard TD run, Felkins kick, 8:40 (PSU 17–10)
- PSU – Felkins, 47-yard field goal, 6:03 (PSU 20–10)
- PSU – Nicholas Singleton, 2-yard TD pass from Allar, Felkins kick, 1:24 (PSU 27–10)

Fourth quarter

- NU – Olsen, 28-yard field goal, 12:01 (PSU 27–13)
- PSU – Singleton, 1-yard TD run, Felkins kick, 4:07 (PSU 34–13)
- PSU – Potts, 30-yard TD pass from Beau Pribula, Felkins kick, 2:20 (PSU 41–13)

Statistics	PSU	NU
First downs	19	12
Plays–yards	73–353	63–175
Rushes–yards	39–134	32–45
Passing yards	219	130
Passing: comp–att–int	19–34–0	16–31–1
Turnovers		
Time of possession	32:08	27:52

Team	Category	Player	Statistics
Penn State	Passing	Drew Allar	18/33, 189 yards TD
Penn State	Rushing	Nicholas Singleton	21 carries, 80 yards, TD
Penn State	Receiving	KeAndre Lambert-Smith	4 receptions, 86 yards
Northwestern	Passing	Ben Bryant	14/25, 122 yards
Northwestern	Rushing	Brendan Sullivan	7 carries, 25 yards
Northwestern	Receiving	Cam Johnson	6 receptions, 81 yards

=== UMass ===
Massachusetts at No. 6 Penn State – Game summary

Quarter	1	2	3	4	Total
UMass	0	0	0	0	0
No. 6 Penn State	7	21	21	14	63

at Beaver Stadium, University Park, Pennsylvania

- Date: October 14
- Game time: 3:30 p.m. EDT
- Game weather: 47 °F (8 °C), rain
- Game attendance: 105,533
- Referee: Jeffrey Servinski
- TV announcers (BTN): Mark Followill, Jake Butt, and Brooke Fletcher
- ESPN box score, GoPSUsports.com box score

Game information

First quarter

- PSU – Daequan Hardy, 56-yard punt return for TD, Alex Felkins kick, 4:17 (PSU 7–0)

Second quarter

- PSU – Drew Allar, 1-yard TD run, Felkins kick, 12:35 (PSU 14–0)
- PSU – Kaytron Allen, 9-yard TD run, Felkins kick, 6:20 (PSU 21–0)
- PSU – Tyler Warren, 7-yard TD pass from Allar, Felkins kick, 1:01 (PSU 28–0)

Third quarter

- PSU – Theo Johnson, 30-yard TD pass from Allar, Felkins kick, 11:29 (PSU 35–0)
- PSU – T. Johnson, 18-yard TD pass from Allar, Felkins kick, 5:12 (PSU 42–0)
- PSU – Hardy, 68-yard punt return for TD, Sander Sahaydak kick, 3:57 (PSU 49–0)

Fourth quarter

- PSU – Trey Potts, 2-yard TD run, Sahaydak kick, 13:37, (PSU 56–0)
- PSU – Beau Pribula, 31-yard TD run, Sahaydak kick, 8:28 (PSU 63–0)

Statistics	UM	PSU
First downs	9	28
Plays–yards	62–109	60–408
Rushes–yards	39–64	37–246
Passing yards	45	162
Passing: comp–att–int	9–23–1	16–23–0
Turnovers		
Time of possession	32:58	27:02

Team	Category	Player	Statistics
Massachusetts	Passing	Taisun Phommachanh	6/14, 25 yards
Massachusetts	Rushing	Kay'Ron Lynch-Adams	14 carries, 31 yards
Massachusetts	Receiving	George Johnson III	2 receptions, 24 yards
Penn State	Passing	Drew Allar	16/23, 162 yards, 3 TD
Penn State	Rushing	Nicholas Singleton	15 carries, 79 yards
Penn State	Receiving	Theo Johnson	4 receptions, 66 yards, 2 TD

=== At No. 3 Ohio State ===
No. 7 Penn State at No. 3 Ohio State – Game summary

Quarter	1	2	3	4	Total
No. 7 Penn State	3	3	0	6	12
No. 3 Ohio State	3	7	0	10	20

at Ohio Stadium, Columbus, Ohio

- Date: October 21
- Game time: 12:00 p.m. EDT
- Game weather: 54 °F (12 °C), cloudy
- Game attendance: 105,506
- Referee: Jerry McGinn
- TV announcers (FOX): Gus Johnson, Joel Klatt, and Jenny Taft
- ESPN box score, GoPSUsports.com box score

Game information

First quarter

- OSU – Jayden Fielding, 33-yard field goal, 10:49 (OSU 3–0)
- PSU – Alex Felkins, 40-yard field goal, 5:15 (TIE 3–3)

Second quarter

- OSU – Miyan Williams, 2-yard TD run, Fielding kick, 7:31 (OSU 10–3)
- PSU – Felkins, 41-yard field goal, 4:16 (OSU 10–6)

Third quarter

No scoring

Fourth quarter

- OSU – Fielding, 37-yard field goal, 8:59 (OSU 13–6)
- OSU – Marvin Harrison Jr., 18-yard TD pass from Kyle McCord, Fielding kick, 4:07 (OSU 20–6)
- PSU – Kaden Saunders, 8-yard TD pass from Drew Allar, 2-point pass conversion failed, 0:29 (OSU 20–12)

Statistics	PSU	OSU
First downs	15	22
Plays–yards	68–240	76–365
Rushes–yards	26–49	41–79
Passing yards	191	286
Passing: comp–att–int	18–42–0	22–35–0
Turnovers		
Time of possession	25:36	34:24

Team	Category	Player	Statistics
Penn State	Passing	Drew Allar	18/42, 191 yards, TD
Penn State	Rushing	Nicholas Singleton	9 carries, 48 yards
Penn State	Receiving	KeAndre Lambert-Smith	6 receptions, 52 yards
Ohio State	Passing	Kyle McCord	22/35, 286 yards, TD
Ohio State	Rushing	Miyan Williams	24 carries, 62 yards, TD
Ohio State	Receiving	Marvin Harrison Jr.	11 receptions, 162 yards, TD

=== Indiana ===
Indiana at No. 10 Penn State – Game summary

Quarter	1	2	3	4	Total
Indiana	7	7	0	10	24
No. 10 Penn State	7	10	7	9	33

at Beaver Stadium, University Park, Pennsylvania

- Date: October 28
- Game time: 12:00 p.m. EDT
- Game weather: 69 °F (21 °C), cloudy
- Game attendance: 107,209
- Referee: Kole Knueppel
- TV announcers (CBS): Tom McCarthy, Devin McCourty, and Tiffany Blackmon
- ESPN box score, GoPSUsports.com box score

Game information

First quarter

- IU – DeQuece Carter, 90-yard TD pass from Brendan Sorsby, Chris Freeman kick, 7:37 (IU 7–0)
- PSU – Khalil Dinkins, 9-yard TD pass from Drew Allar, Alex Felkins kick, 1:37 (TIE 7–7)

Second quarter

- IU – Donaven McCulley, 69-yard TD pass from Sorsby, Freeman kick, 13:26 (IU 14–7)
- PSU – Nicholas Singleton, 2-yard TD run, Felkins kick, 2:02 (TIE 14–14)
- PSU – Felkins, 50-yard field goal, 0:00 (PSU 17–14)

Third quarter

- PSU – Theo Johnson, 16-yard TD pass from Allar, Felkins kick, 8:39 (PSU 24–14)

Fourth quarter

- IU – Omar Cooper Jr., 26-yard TD pass from Sorsby, Freeman kick, 10:54 (PSU 24–21)
- IU – Freeman, 35-yard field goal, 2:58 (TIE 24–24)
- PSU – KeAndre Lambert-Smith, 57-yard TD pass from Allar, Felkins kick, 1:46 (PSU 31–24)
- PSU – Safety, Indiana fumbled the ball out of the end zone, 1:33 (PSU 33–24)

Statistics	IU	PSU
First downs	14	19
Plays–yards	53–349	74–342
Rushes–yards	34–80	43–132
Passing yards	269	210
Passing: comp–att–int	13–19–1	20–31–1
Turnovers		
Time of possession	24:35	35:25

Team	Category	Player	Statistics
Indiana	Passing	Brendan Sorsby	13/19, 269 yards, 3 TD, INT
Indiana	Rushing	Josh Henderson	12 carries, 57 yards
Indiana	Receiving	DeQuece Carter	3 receptions, 104 yards, TD
Penn State	Passing	Drew Allar	20/31, 210 yards, 3 TD, INT
Penn State	Rushing	Kaytron Allen	18 carries, 81 yards
Penn State	Receiving	KeAndre Lambert-Smith	6 receptions, 96 yards, TD

=== At Maryland ===
No. 11^{CFP}/9^{AP} Penn State at Maryland – Game summary

Quarter	1	2	3	4	Total
No. 11^{CFP}/9^{AP} Penn State	14	7	3	27	51
Maryland	0	7	0	8	15

at SECU Stadium, College Park, Maryland

- Date: November 4
- Game time: 3:30 p.m. EDT
- Game weather: 68 °F (20 °C), clear
- Game attendance: 51,802
- Referee: Jeffrey Servinski
- TV announcers (FOX): Jason Benetti, Brock Huard, and Allison Williams
- ESPN box score, GoPSU.com box score

Game information

First quarter

- PSU – Dante Cephas, 6-yard TD pass from Drew Allar, Alex Felkins kick, 8:41 (PSU 7–0)
- PSU – Theo Johnson, 2-yard TD pass from Allar, Felkins kick, 0:02 (PSU 14–0)

Second quarter

- UM – Roman Hemby, 7-yard TD pass from Taulia Tagovailoa, Jack Howes kick, 7:59 (PSU 14–7)
- PSU – Tyler Warren, 8-yard TD pass from Allar, Felkins kick, 2:34 (PSU 21–7)

Third quarter

- PSU – Felkins, 30-yard field goal, 9:26 (PSU 24–7)

Fourth quarter

- PSU – Cephas, 15-yard TD pass from Allar, Felkins kick, 13:55 (PSU 31–7)
- UM – Jeshaun Jones, 1-yard TD pass from Tagovailoa, Antwain Littleton II run for 2-point conversion, 11:27 (PSU 31–15)
- PSU – Kaytron Allen, 10-yard TD run, Felkins kick, 9:14 (PSU 38–15)
- PSU – Felkins, 35-yard field goal, 7:38 (PSU 41–15)
- PSU – Felkins, 39-yard field goal, 2:51 (PSU 44–15)
- PSU – Beau Pribula, 6-yard TD run, Felkins kick, 1:25 (PSU 51–15)

Statistics	PSU	UM
First downs	25	15
Plays–yards	76–404	58–234
Rushes–yards	37–158	16–(-49)
Passing yards	246	283
Passing: comp–att–int	26–39–0	31–42–2
Turnovers		
Time of possession	37:14	22:46

Team	Category	Player	Statistics
Penn State	Passing	Drew Allar	25/34, 240 yards, 4 TD
Penn State	Rushing	Kaytron Allen	14 carries, 91 yards, TD
Penn State	Receiving	KeAndre Lambert-Smith	8 receptions, 95 yards
Maryland	Passing	Taulia Tagovailoa	29/39, 286 yards, 2 TD, INT
Maryland	Rushing	Billy Edwards Jr.	1 carry, 4 yards
Maryland	Receiving	Tai Felton	4 receptions, 75 yards

=== No. 3^{CFP}/2^{AP} Michigan ===
No. 3^{CFP}/2^{AP} Michigan at No. 10^{CFP}/9^{AP} Penn State – Game summary

Quarter	1	2	3	4	Total
No. 3^{CFP}/2^{AP} Michigan	0	14	3	7	24
No. 10^{CFP}/9^{AP} Penn State	3	6	0	6	15

at Beaver Stadium, University Park, Pennsylvania

- Date: November 11
- Game time: 12:00 p.m. EST
- Game weather: 45 °F (7 °C), sunny
- Game attendance: 110,856
- Referee: Gregory Blum
- TV announcers (FOX): Gus Johnson, Joel Klatt, and Jenny Taft
- ESPN box score, GoPSUsports.com box score

Game information

First quarter

- PSU – Alex Felkins, 20-yard field goal, 2:17 (PSU 3–0)

Second quarter

- UM – Blake Corum, 3-yard TD run, James Turner kick, 11:56 (UM 7–3)
- UM – Donovan Edwards, 22-yard TD run, Turner kick, 6:07 (UM 14–3)
- PSU – Drew Allar, 11-yard TD run, 2-point pass conversion failed, 0:29 (UM 14–9)

Third quarter

- UM – Turner, 22-yard field goal, 3:36 (UM 17–9)

Fourth quarter

- UM – Corum, 30-yard TD run, Turner kick, 4:15 (UM 24–9)
- PSU – Theo Johnson, 8-yard TD pass from Allar, 2-point pass conversion failed, 1:59 (UM 24–15)

Penn State hosted Michigan on November 11. As the Michigan team and coaching staff flew to Pennsylvania on Friday afternoon, Big Ten commissioner Tony Petitti suspended head coach Jim Harbaugh from game-day coaching for the remainder of the regular season as punishment for the Michigan Wolverines football sign-stealing scandal.

Michigan defeated Penn State, 24–15, before a crowd of 110,856 at Beaver Stadium. The first three drives of the game ended with punts. Penn State then drove 66 yards on 13 plays and became the first team to run a play inside Michigan's 10-yard line during the 2023 season. Facing a first-and-goal from the three-yard line, Michigan's defense stopped the Nittany Lions who settled for a 20-yard field goal by Alex Felkins. After Penn State's field goal, Michigan drove 75 yards on nine plays, including a 22-yard run by Donovan Edwards, a pass from J. J. McCarthy to Semaj Morgan for 19 yards and ending with a three-yard touchdown run by Blake Corum. After holding Penn State to a three-and-out, Michigan drove 78 yards on six plays, including a 44-yard run by Corum and a 22-yard touchdown run by Edwards. Late in the second quarter, Penn State drove 75 yards and scored on an 11-yard touchdown run by Drew Allar, though its attempt at a two-point conversion failed. Michigan led, 14–9 at halftime.

On the opening drive of the second half, Allar fumbled after being hit by Rayshaun Benny, and Michigan's Makari Paige recovered the loose ball at the Penn State 49-yard line. After the turnover, Michigan drove to the Penn State four-yard line, and James Turner kicked a 22-yard field goal. The defenses then took control of the game as six consecutive drives ended with punts, With four-and-a-half minutes remaining in the game, Michigan forced a turnover on downs as Allar threw an incomplete pass on fourth down. Corum ran 30 yard for a touchdown with 4:15 remaining in the game. In the closing minutes, Penn State drove 75 yards on eight plays, scoring on an eight-yard touchdown pass from Allar to Theo Johnson. Penn State again failed on an attempted two-point conversion. Penn State attempted an onside kick, but Mike Sainristil fell on the ball, and Michigan ran out the clock.

Blake Corum carried the ball 26 times for 145 yards and two touchdowns. The team totaled 227 rushing yards against a Penn State defense that had the top-ranked rushing defense in the county, having not allowed any opponent to rush for more than 100 yards in a game. Despite this, Michigan would be held to their lowest point total of the year by Penn State's defense, with Michigan having only 17 points when Penn State went for it on 4th down despite the poor field position. Following the loss to Michigan, offensive coordinator Mike Yurcich was fired.

Statistics	UM	PSU
First downs	15	17
Plays–yards	54–287	58–238
Rushes–yards	46–227	35–164
Passing yards	60	74
Passing: comp–att–int	7–8–0	11–23–0
Turnovers		
Time of possession	33:12	26:48

Team	Category	Player	Statistics
Michigan	Passing	J. J. McCarthy	7/8, 60 yards
Michigan	Rushing	Blake Corum	26 carries, 145 yards, 2 TD
Michigan	Receiving	Cornelius Johnson	2 receptions, 24 yards
Penn State	Passing	Drew Allar	10/22, 70 yards, TD
Penn State	Rushing	Kaytron Allen	12 carries, 72 yards
Penn State	Receiving	Tyler Warren	2 receptions, 25 yards

=== Rutgers ===
Rutgers at No. 12^{CFP/AP} Penn State – Game summary

Quarter	1	2	3	4	Total
Rutgers	3	3	0	0	6
No. 12^{CFP/AP} Penn State	0	10	3	14	27

at Beaver Stadium, University Park, Pennsylvania

- Date: November 18
- Game time: 12:00 p.m. EST
- Game weather: 45 °F (7 °C), mostly sunny
- Game attendance: 105,114
- Referee: Rod Snodgrass
- TV announcers (FS1): Chris Myers and Robert Smith
- ESPN box score, GoPSUsports.com box score

Game information

First quarter

- RU – Jai Patel, 35-yard field goal, 4:43 (RU 3–0)

Second quarter

- PSU – Kaytron Allen, 2-yard TD run, Alex Felkins kick, 11:36 (PSU 7–3)
- PSU – Felkins, 21-yard field goal, 8:44 (PSU 10–3)
- RU – Patel, 28-yard field goal, 0:00 (PSU 10–6)

Third quarter

- PSU – Felkins, 48-yard field goal, 5:32 (PSU 13–6)

Fourth quarter

- PSU – Allen, 3-yard TD run, Felkins kick, 14:14 (PSU 20-6)
- PSU – Beau Pribula, 1-yard TD run, Felkins kick, 3:36 (PSU 27–6)

Penn State beat Rutgers decisively in a 27–6 rout where the defense really shone. Rutgers would strike first but Penn State would take control of the game in the second quarter, leading 13–6 at halftime and silencing the Scarlet Knights' offense in the second half, eventually taking a three-touchdown lead late in the game before allowing the reserves a little playing time. Despite the commanding three-touchdown victory, Penn State was criticized for the win not being even more impressive, despite the fact that Rutgers was a middle-of-the-pack Big Ten East team that year who would eventually finish 7–6. This is likely due to the reputation of Rutgers finishing last and faring poorly from 2015 through 2020. Penn State would finish the regular season 10–2 eventually losing to Ole Miss in the Peach Bowl to finish 10–3 while Rutgers won their bowl game after a 6–6 finish to finish with their first winning season since 2014, their Big Ten debut season.

Statistics	RU	PSU
First downs	13	16
Plays–yards	58–229	53–322
Rushes–yards	42–99	39–234
Passing yards	130	88
Passing: comp–att–int	10–16–1	7–14–0
Turnovers		
Time of possession	32:00	28:00

Team	Category	Player	Statistics
Rutgers	Passing	Gavin Wimsatt	10/16, 130 yards, INT
Rutgers	Rushing	Kyle Monangai	16 carries, 39 yards
Rutgers	Receiving	Isaiah Washington	5 receptions, 55 yards
Penn State	Passing	Drew Allar	6/13, 79 yards
Penn State	Rushing	Beau Pribula	8 carries, 71 yards, TD
Penn State	Receiving	Tyler Warren	2 receptions, 32 yards

=== At Michigan State ===
No. 11^{CFP/AP} Penn State at Michigan State – Game summary

Quarter	1	2	3	4	Total
No. 11^{CFP/AP} Penn State	3	10	15	14	42
Michigan State	0	0	0	0	0

at Ford Field, Detroit, Michigan

- Date: November 24
- Game time: 7:30 p.m. EST
- Game weather: indoor stadium
- Game attendance: 51,927
- Referee: Chris Coyte
- TV announcers (NBC): Noah Eagle, Todd Blackledge, and Kathryn Tappen
- ESPN box score, GoPSUsports.com box score

Game information

First quarter

- PSU – Alex Felkins, 49-yard field goal, 9:50 (PSU 3–0)

Second quarter

- PSU – Felkins, 30-yard field goal, 12:11 (PSU 6–0)
- PSU – Kaytron Allen, 2-yard TD pass from Drew Allar, Felkins kick, 4:51 (PSU 13–0)

Third quarter

- PSU – Tyler Warren, 8-yard TD pass from Beau Pribula, 2-point conversion pass to KeAndre Lambert-Smith from Allar, 10:13 (PSU 21–0)
- PSU – Pribula, 2-yard TD run, Felkins kick, 4:13 (PSU 28–0)

Fourth quarter

- PSU – Theo Johnson, 21-yard TD pass from Allar, Felkins kick, 12:29 (PSU 35–0)
- PSU – Nicholas Singleton, 14-yard TD run, Sander Sahaydak kick, 7:58 (PSU 42–0)

Penn State would commandingly handle their rivals from East Lansing in a 42–0 blowout where the outcome of the game was never in question.

Statistics	PSU	MSU
First downs	23	5
Plays–yards	67–586	47–53
Rushes–yards	39–283	27–(-35)
Passing yards	303	88
Passing: comp–att–int	19–28–0	12–20–1
Turnovers		
Time of possession	35:50	24:10

Team	Category	Player	Statistics
Penn State	Passing	Drew Allar	17/26, 292 yards, 2 TD
Penn State	Rushing	Kaytron Allen	15 carries, 137 yards
Penn State	Receiving	Nicholas Singleton	2 receptions, 68 yards
Michigan State	Passing	Katin Houser	11/19, 87 yards, INT
Michigan State	Rushing	Nate Carter	8 carries, 39 yards
Michigan State	Receiving	Montorie Foster Jr.	2 receptions, 35 yards

=== Vs. No. 11^{CFP/AP} Mississippi (Peach Bowl) ===
No. 11^{CFP/AP} Mississippi vs. No. 10^{CFP/AP} Penn State – Game summary

Quarter	1	2	3	4	Total
No. 11^{CFP/AP} Mississippi	10	10	11	7	38
No. 10^{CFP/AP} Penn State	3	14	0	8	25

at Mercedes-Benz Stadium, Atlanta, Georgia

- Date: December 30
- Game time: 12:00 p.m. EST
- Game weather: indoors, roof closed
- Game attendance: 71,230
- Referee: Mike McCabe
- TV announcers (ESPN): Mark Jones, Louis Riddick, and Quint Kessenich
- ESPN box score, GoPSUsports.com box score

Game information

First quarter

- PSU – Alex Felkins, 26-yard field goal, 9:17 (PSU 3–0)
- UM – Caden Davis, 36-yard field goal, 7:16 (TIE 3–3)
- UM – Caden Prieskorn, 6-yard TD pass from Jaxson Dart, Davis kick, 0:30 (UM 10–3)

Second quarter

- PSU – Theo Johnson, 2-yard TD pass from Drew Allar, Felkins kick, 13:34 (TIE 10–10)
- UM – Davis, 45-yard field goal, 10:33 (UM 13–10)
- UM – Prieskorn, 37-yard TD pass from Dart, Davis kick, 4:58 (UM 20–10)
- PSU – Nicholas Singleton, 48-yard TD pass from Beau Pribula, Felkins kick, 2:45 (UM 20–17)

Third quarter

- UM – Davis, 52-yard field goal, 10:48 (UM 23–17)
- UM – Quinshon Judkins, 14-yard TD pass from Dart, Prieskorn pass from Dart for 2-point conversion,, 4:10 (UM 31–17)

Fourth quarter

- UM – Dart, 2-yard TD run, Davis kick, 6:29 (UM 38–17)
- PSU – Harrison Wallace III, 14-yard TD pass from Allar, Singleton pass from Pribula for 2-point conversion, 4:14 (UM 38–25)

Penn State would blow their chance at winning all of the major bowls by losing the Peach Bowl.

Statistics	UM	PSU
First downs	30	21
Plays–yards	88–540	68–510
Rushes–yards	47–146	28–167
Passing yards	394	343
Passing: comp–att–int	26–41–0	20–40–1
Turnovers		
Time of possession	33:38	26:22

Team	Category	Player	Statistics
Mississippi	Passing	Jaxson Dart	25/40, 379 yards, 3 TD
Mississippi	Rushing	Quinshon Judkins	34 carries, 106 yards
Mississippi	Receiving	Caden Prieskorn	10 receptions, 136 yards, 2 TD
Penn State	Passing	Drew Allar	19/39, 295 yards, 2 TD, INT
Penn State	Rushing	Kaytron Allen	10 carries, 51 yards
Penn State	Receiving	Tyler Warren	5 receptions, 127 yards

== Rankings ==
Ranking movements Legend: ██ Increase in ranking ██ Decrease in ranking
	Week															
Poll	Pre	1	2	3	4	5	6	7	8	9	10	11	12	13	14	Final
AP	7	7	7	7	6	6	6	7	10	9	9	12	11	10	10	13
Coaches	7	7	7	7	7	6	5	6	10	9	9	12	11	10	10	13
CFP	Not released									11	10	12	11	10	10	Not released

== Roster ==
2023 Penn State Nittany Lions football team roster
Players
Coaches
Offense

Pos.	#	Name	Class
QB	9	Beau Pribula	Fr
QB	14	Jaxon Smolik	Fr
QB	15	Drew Allar	So
RB	10	Nicholas Singleton	So
RB	13	Kaytron Allen	So
RB	23	Trey Potts	Sr
RB	24	London Montgomery	Fr
RB	26	Cam Wallace	Fr
RB	30	Amiel Davis	So
RB	34	Tyler Holzworth	So
RB	38	Tank Smith	Sr
WR	1	KeAndre Lambert-Smith	Jr
WR	2	Liam Clifford	So
WR	3	Dante Cephas	Sr
WR	4	Malick Meiga	Jr
WR	5	Omari Evans	So
WR	6	Harrison Wallace III	So
WR	7	Kaden Saunders	Fr
WR	8	Tyler Johnson	Fr
WR	11	Malik McClain	Jr
WR	12	Anthony Ivey	Fr
WR	17	Mason Stahl	Jr
WR	19	Jaden Dottin	Jr
WR	21	Carmelo Taylor	Fr
WR	80	Cristian Driver	Fr
WR	81	Jan Mahlert	So
WR	81	Robert Rossi	So
WR	83	Jake Spencer	Jr
WR	86	Jason Estrella	So
TE	16	Khalil Dinkins	So
TE	18	Joey Schlaffer	Fr
TE	44	Tyler Warren	Jr
TE	84	Theo Johnson	Jr
TE	87	Kolt Pearce	So
TE	87	Andrew Rappleyea	Fr
TE	88	Jerry Cross	Fr
OL	51	Jimmy Christ	Jr
OL	52	Dominic Rulli	Fr
OL	53	Nick Dawkins	Jr
OL	54	Ian Harvie	Fr
OL	55	Chimdy Onoh	Fr
OL	56	JB Nelson	Jr
OL	57	Ibrahim Traore	Jr
OL	58	Landon Tengwall (injured)	So
OL	63	Alex Birchmeier	Fr
OL	64	Hunter Nourzad	Sr
OL	65	Jim Fitzgerald	Fr
OL	66	Drew Shelton	So
OL	68	Anthony Donkoh	Fr
OL	69	Ben Hartman	So
OL	70	J'ven Williams	Fr
OL	71	Vega Ioane	So
OL	73	Caedan Wallace	Sr
OL	74	Olu Fashanu (injured)	Jr
OL	75	Matt Detisch	Fr
OL	77	Sal Wormley	Sr
OL	78	Golden Israel-Achumba	Jr
OL	79	Addison Penn	Jr

Defense

Pos.	#	Name	Class
CB	3	Johnny Dixon	Sr
CB	4	Kalen King	Jr
CB	5	Cam Miller	So
CB	8	DaKaari Nelson	Fr
CB	12	Zion Tracy	Fr
CB	16	Elliot Washington II	Fr
CB	19	Xavier Copening	So
CB	24	Jeffrey Davis Jr.	So
CB	25	Daequan Hardy	Sr
CB	27	Lamont Payne Jr.	Fr
CB	29	Audavion Collins	Fr
CB	30	George Hlavac	Fr
CB	31	Kolin Dinkins	So
CB	35	Jace Tutty	So
CB	36	Stephen Ripka	So
DE	15	Amin Vanover	Jr
DE	19	Jameial Lyons	Fr
DE	20	Adisa Isaac	Sr
DE	33	Dani Dennis-Sutton	So
DE	36	Zuriah Fisher	Jr
DE	42	Mason Robinson	Fr
DE	44	Chop Robinson	Jr
DE	56	Joseph Mupoyi	Fr
DE	90	Rodney McGraw	So
DE	92	Smith Vilbert	Sr
DE	94	Jake Wilson	Jr
DE	98	Andrew Sharga	Jr
DT	18	Davon Townley Jr.	So
DT	28	Zane Durant	So
DT	39	Ty Blanding	Fr
DT	47	Alex Furmanek	Sr
DT	50	Alonzo Ford Jr.	Jr
DT	51	Hakeem Beamon	Sr
DT	52	Jordan van den Berg	So
DT	55	Fatorma Mulbah	Jr
DT	58	Kaleb Artis	Fr
DT	88	Sam Siafa	Fr
DT	91	Dvon Ellies	Sr
DT	99	Coziah Izzard	Jr
LB	11	Abdul Carter	So
LB	13	Tony Rojas	Fr
LB	23	Curtis Jacobs	Jr
LB	24	Ta'Mere Robinson	Fr
LB	27	Bobby Walchak	So
LB	32	Keon Wylie	Fr
LB	34	Dominic DeLuca	So
LB	39	Robbie Dwyer	Sr
LB	41	Kobe King	So
LB	42	Jamari Buddin	So
LB	43	Tyler Elsdon	Jr
LB	45	Jackson Pryts	Fr
LB	48	Kaveion Keys	Fr
LB	49	Ben Chizmar	So
S	1	Jaylen Reed	Jr
S	2	Keaton Ellis	Sr
S	6	Zakee Wheatley	So
S	8	DaKaari Nelson	Fr
S	9	King Mack	Fr
S	10	Mekhi Flowers	Fr
S	14	Tyrece Mills	Jr
S	21	Kevin Winston Jr.	So
S	26	Jaden Seider	Sr
S	29	Sebastian Costantini	Sr
S	37	Trace Brown	So
S	39	Jashaun Green	Fr
S	40	Patrick Williams	Fr

Special teams

Pos.	#	Name	Class
K	91	Alex Felkins	Sr
K	93	Sander Sahaydak	So
K	95	Riley Thompson	Sr
K	96	Mitchell Groh	So
P	97	Alex Bacchetta	Fr
P	99	Gabriel Nwosu	So
LS	35	Blaise Sokach-Minnick	Fr
LS	47	Will Patton	Fr
LS	48	Tyler Duzansky	So
LS	49	Michael Wright	Jr

Head coach

- James Franklin

Coordinators/assistant coaches

- Mike Yurcich (offensive coordinator / quarterbacks) (fired November 12)
- Ja'Juan Seider (co-offensive coordinator) (beginning November 12)
- Ty Howle (co-offensive coordinator) (beginning November 12)
- Manny Diaz (defensive coordinator / linebackers)
- Stacy Collins (special teams coordinator / outside linebackers / nickel)
- Terry Smith (associate head coach / defensive recruiting coordinator / Cornerbacks)
- Ja'Juan Seider (co-offensive coordinator / running backs)
- Deion Barnes (defensive line)
- Marques Hagans (wide receivers)
- Ty Howle (tight ends)
- Anthony Poindexter (co-defensive coordinator / safeties)
- Phil Trautwein (offensive line)
- Kevin Threlkel (assistant AD / chief of staff)
- Andy Frank (director of player personnel)
- Ben Kerr (director of football administration)
- Chuck Losey III (assistant AD / performance enhancement)
- Will Flaherty (director of player development & community relations)

Legend

- (C) Team captain
- (S) Suspended
- (I) Ineligible
- Injured
- Redshirt

Roster
Last update: November 17, 2023

=== Depth chart ===
Defense

FS
Jaylen Reed
Keaton Ellis
DaKaari Nelson

MIKE	WILL	SAM
Abdul Carter	Curtis Jacobs	Tony Rojas
Kobe King	Ta'Mere Robinson	Keon Wylie
Kaveion Keys	Tyler Elsdon	Dominic DeLuca

SS
Kevin Winston Jr.
Zakee Wheatley
Mekhi Flowers

CB
Kalen King
Cam Miller
Zion Tracy

DE	DT	DT	DE
Chop Robinson	Zane Durant	Dvon Ellies	Adisa Isaac
Jameial Lyons	Coziah Izzard	Hakeem Beamon	Dani Dennis-Sutton
Smith Vilbert	Dvon J-Thomas	Jordan van den Berg	Amin Vanover

CB
Johnny Dixon
Daequan Hardy
Elliot Washington Jr.

Offense

WR
KeAndre Lambert-Smith
Omari Evans
Liam Clifford

WR
Dante Cephas
Malick Meiga
Kaden Saunders

LT	LG	C	RG	RT
Olu Fashanu	JB Nelson	Hunter Nourzad	Sal Wormley	Caedan Wallace
Landon Tengwall	Golden Israel-Achumba	Alex Birchmeier	Nick Dawkins	Ibrahim Traore
Matt Detisch	Drew Shelton	Addison Penn	Chimdy Onoh	Jim Fitzgerald

TE
Theo Johnson
Tyler Warren
Khalil Dinkins

WR
Harrison Wallace III
Malik McClain
Tyler Johnson

QB
Drew Allar
Beau Pribula
Jaxon Smolik

RB
Nicholas Singleton
Kaytron Allen
Trey Potts

Special teams
PK Alex Felkins
P Riley Thompson
