= 2020 Penn State Nittany Lions football team =

American college football season

2020 Penn State Nittany Lions football
- Conference: Big Ten Conference
- East Division
- Record: 4–5 (4–5 Big Ten)
- Head coach: James Franklin (7th season)
- Offensive coordinator: Kirk Ciarrocca (1st season)
- Co-offensive coordinator: Tyler Bowen (1st season)
- Offensive scheme: Spread
- Defensive coordinator: Brent Pry (5th season)
- Co-defensive coordinator: Tim Banks (5th season)
- Base defense: 4–3
- Home stadium: Beaver Stadium

2020 Big Ten Conference football standings
	Conf.			Overall
Team	W		L	W		L
East Division
No. 2 Ohio State xy$^	5	–	0	7	–	1
No. 12 Indiana	6	–	1	6	–	2
Penn State	4	–	5	4	–	5
Maryland	2	–	3	2	–	3
Rutgers	3	–	6	3	–	6
Michigan	2	–	4	2	–	4
Michigan State	2	–	5	2	–	5
West Division
No. 10 Northwestern xy	6	–	1	7	–	2
No. 16 Iowa	6	–	2	6	–	2
Wisconsin	3	–	3	4	–	3
Minnesota	3	–	4	3	–	4
Nebraska	3	–	5	3	–	5
Purdue	2	–	4	2	–	4
Illinois	2	–	6	2	–	6
Championship: Ohio State 22, Northwestern 10
^ – College Football Playoff participant; $ – Conference champion; x – Division champion/co-champions; y – Championship game participant; Note: Due to COVID-19, the Big Ten suspended the season on August 11, but later decided to begin play on October 24. In addition to the title game that was played on December 19, the conference seeded all remaining teams for "championship week" games.; Rankings from AP Poll.

The 2020 Penn State Nittany Lions football team represented the Pennsylvania State University in the 2020 NCAA Division I FBS football season as a member of the Big Ten Conference. The team was led by seventh-year head coach James Franklin.

On August 11, 2020, the Big Ten Conference canceled all fall sports competitions due to the COVID-19 pandemic. On September 16, the Big Ten reinstated the football season, announcing an eight-game season beginning on October 24.

On November 21, after losing to Iowa, Penn State's record dropped to 0–5, the worst start in the program's history, dating to 1887. The team went on to win its final four games, finishing the regular season at 4–5. On December 19, the program announced that it was removing itself from consideration for a bowl game.

== Offseason ==
=== 2020 NFL draft ===
Round	Pick	Player	Team
2	38	Yetur Gross-Matos	Carolina Panthers
2	46	K. J. Hamler	Denver Broncos
4	141	John Reid	Houston Texans
6	183	Cam Brown	New York Giants
6	193	Robert Windsor	Indianapolis Colts
Undrafted		Steven Gonzalez	Arizona Cardinals
Undrafted		Nick Bowers	Las Vegas Raiders
Undrafted		Garrett Taylor	Buffalo Bills
Undrafted		Jan Johnson	Houston Texans
Undrafted		Blake Gillikin	New Orleans Saints
Undrafted		Dan Chisena	Minnesota Vikings

=== Recruiting ===
The Nittany Lions signed 27 recruits during the 2020 signing cycle, securing the 15th ranked recruiting class in the country. This was Penn State's fourth consecutive top 15 recruiting class. 11 of the 27 signings in the 2020 class enrolled early.

=== Returning starters ===
Offensive returning starters (8)
Player	Year	Position	2019 Games Started
Sean Clifford	Senior	QB	13
Journey Brown	Senior	RB	13
Rasheed Walker	Junior	OL	13
Mike Miranda	Senior	OL	8
Michal Menet	5th-Sr	OL	13
C.J. Thorpe	Senior	OL	5
Will Fries	Graduate student	OL	13
Pat Freiermuth	Junior	TE	13

== Personnel ==
=== Coaching staff ===
Penn State football current coaching staff
Name	Position	Alma Mater	Years at Penn State
James Franklin	Head Coach	East Stroudsburg University (1995)	7th
Brent Pry	Defensive coordinator/linebackers	University at Buffalo (1993)	7th
Kirk Ciarrocca	Offensive coordinator/quarterbacks coach	Temple University (1990)	1st
Tim Banks	Co-defensive coordinator/safeties	Central Michigan University (1995)	5th
Tyler Bowen	Co-offensive coordinator/offensive recruiting coordinator/tight ends	University of Maryland (2010)	3rd
Phil Trautwein	Offensive line	University of Florida (2007)	1st
John Scott	Defensive line	Western Carolina University (2000)	1st
Taylor Stubblefield	Wide receivers	Purdue University (2004)	1st
Ja'Juan Seider	Run Game Coordinator/running backs	West Virginia University (2000)	3rd
Terry Smith	Assistant head coach/defensive recruiting coordinator/cornerbacks	Penn State University (1991)	7th
Joe Lorig	Special teams coordinator/outside Linebacker	Western Oregon University (1995)	2nd
Dwight Galt III	Assistant AD, Performance Enhancement	University of Maryland (1981)	7th
V'Angelo Bentley	Graduate Assistant	University of Illinois (2015)	2nd
Jeff Carpenter	Graduate Assistant	Penn State University (2015)	1st
Deion Barnes	Graduate Assistant	Penn State University (2014)	1st
Wendy Laurent	Graduate Assistant	Penn State University (2016)	1st
Ty Howle	Offensive assistant	Penn State University (2013)	1st

=== Roster ===
2020 Penn State Nittany Lions football roster
Quarterback: 2 Micah Bowens – freshman (5'11, 196); 7 Will Levis – (redshirt) sophomore (6'3, 222); 9 Ta'Quan Roberson – (redshirt) freshman (5'11, 195); 14 Sean Clifford – (redshirt) junior (6'2, 217); 17 Mason Stahl – freshman (6'0, 204); Running back: 4 Journey Brown – (redshirt) junior (5'11, 217); 21 Noah Cain – sophomore (5'10, 226); 24 Keyvone Lee – freshman (6'0, 230); 26 Caziah Holmes – freshman (5'11, 209); 28 Devyn Ford – sophomore (5'11, 205); 30 Joseph Bruno – freshman (6'0, 202); 38 Tank Smith – (redshirt) freshman (5'7, 227); Wide receiver: 3 Parker Washington – freshman (5'10, 205); 5 Jahan Dotson – junior (5'11, 182); 6 Cam Sullivan-Brown – (redshirt) junior (6'0, 191); 10 TJ Jones – (redshirt) freshman (6'1, 202); 11 Daniel George – (redshirt) sophomore (6'2, 210); 13 KeAndre Lambert-Smith – freshman (6'1, 185); 19 Jaden Dottin – freshman (6'2, 190); 29 Henry Fessler – (redshirt) sophomore (5'10, 182); 80 Malick Meiga – freshman (6'4, 198); 80 Justin Weller – (redshirt) junior (6'0, 194); 83 Johnny Crise – freshman (6'5, 201); 84 Benjamin Wilson – senior (6'2, 212); 85 Isaac Lutz – (redshirt) senior (5'11, 197); 88 Norval Black – junior (6'1, 178); Tight end: 43 Trevor Baker – (redshirt) junior (6'3, 246); 44 Tyler Warren – freshman (6'6, 244); 47 Tommy Friberg – (redshirt) freshman (6'3, 210); 82 Zack Kuntz – (redshirt) sophomore (6'7, 258); 84 Theo Johnson – freshman (6'6, 254); 86 Brenton Strange – (redshirt) freshman (6'3, 252); 87 Pat Freiermuth – junior (6'5, 258); 89 Grayson Kline – (redshirt) sophomore (6'5, 261); Placekicker: 90 Rafael Checa – (redshirt) sophomore (6'2, 203); 92 Jake Pinegar – junior (6'2, 192); 95 Vlad Hilling – (redshirt) sophomore (5'10, 213); 96 Anthony DaSilva – (redshirt) freshman (5'11, 157)	Offensive lineman: 50 Will Knutsson – (redshirt) sophomore (6'2, 319); 51 Jimmy Christ – freshman (6'7, 298); 52 Blake Zalar – (redshirt) freshman (6'1, 289); 53 Rasheed Walker – (redshirt) sophomore (6'6, 310); 54 George French II – freshman (6'8, 320); 55 Anthony Whigan – (redshirt) junior (6'4, 315); 57 Ibrahim Traore – freshman (6'5, 325); 59 Kaleb Konigus – (redshirt) sophomore (6'2, 291); 62 Michal Menet – (redshirt) senior (6'4, 306); 63 Collin De Boef – (redshirt) sophomore (6'5, 264); 66 Nick Dawkins – freshman (6'4, 310); 69 C.J. Thorpe – (redshirt) junior (6'3, 313); 70 Juice Scruggs – (redshirt) sophomore (6'3, 302); 71 Will Fries – (redshirt) senior (6'6, 306); 72 Bryce Effner – (redshirt) sophomore (6'5, 301); 73 Mike Miranda – (redshirt) junior (6'3, 301); 74 Olu Fashanu – freshman (6'6, 300); 75 Des Holmes – (redshirt) junior (6'5, 312); 76 Justin Kopko – (redshirt) freshman (6'3, 318); 77 Sal Wormley – (redshirt) freshman (6'3, 317); 78 Golden Israel-Achumba – freshman (6'4, 345); 79 Caedan Wallace – (redshirt) freshman (6'5, 313); Defensive lineman: 18 Shaka Toney – DE – (redshirt) senior (6'3, 252); 20 Adisa Isaac – DE – sophomore (6'4, 251); 27 Aeneas Hawkins – DT – (redshirt) sophomore (6'2, 288); 28 Odafe Oweh – DE – (redshirt) sophomore (6'5, 252); 33 Bryce Mostella – DE – freshman (6'6, 248); 34 Shane Simmons – DE – (redshirt) senior (6'3, 257); 42 Ellison Jordan – DT – (redshirt) junior (6'0, 320); 44 Joseph Darkwa – DT – (redshirt) freshman (6'5, 293); 46 Nick Tarburton – DE – (redshirt) sophomore (6'3, 252); 51 Hakeem Beamon – DE – (redshirt) freshman (6'3, 292); 53 Fred Hansard – DT – (redshirt) junior (6'3, 324); 54 Fatorma Mulbah – DT – freshman (6'3, 289); 55 Antonio Shelton – DT – (redshirt) senior (6'2, 327); 56 Amin Vanover – DT – freshman (6'4, 279); 77 Judge Culpepper – DT – (redshirt) sophomore (6'4, 295); 91 Dvon Ellies – DT – (redshirt) freshman (6'1, 296); 92 Smith Vilbert – DE – (redshirt) freshman (6'6, 251); 94 Jake Wilson – DE – freshman (6'3, 241); 95 Cole Brevard – DT – freshman (6'3, 312); 97 P. J. Mustipher – DT – junior (6'4, 300); 98 Dan Vasey – DE – (redshirt) junior (6'4, 251); 99 Coziah Izzard – DT – freshman (6'3, 290); Punter: 93 Levi Forrest – freshman(6'5, 184); 93 Bradley King – (redshirt) junior (6'2, 214); 97 Carson Landis – (redshirt) junior (6'2, 206); 98 Jordan Stout – (redshirt) junior (6'3, 208)	Linebacker: 10 Lance Dixon – (redshirt) freshman (6'2, 225); 12 Brandon Smith – sophomore (6'3, 244); 13 Ellis Brooks – (redshirt) junior (6'1, 233); 23 Curtis Jacobs – freshman (6'1, 226); 36 Zuriah Fisher – freshman (6'3, 244); 39 Robbie Dwyer – (redshirt) freshman(6'1, 247); 40 Jesse Luketa – junior (6'3, 242); 43 Tyler Elsdon – freshman (6'2, 230); 45 Charlie Katshir – (redshirt) sophomore (6'3, 231); 47 Alex Furmanek – (redshirt) freshman(6'2, 265); 50 Max Chizmar – (redshirt) junior (6'2, 229); Defensive back: 0 Jonathan Sutherland – S – (redshirt) junior (5'11, 202); 1 Jaquan Brisker – S – senior (6'1, 210); 2 Keaton Ellis – CB – sophomore (5'11, 186); 3 Donovan Johnson – CB – (redshirt) junior (5'9, 180); 5 Tariq Castro-Fields – CB – senior (6'0, 191); 8 Marquis Wilson – CB – sophomore (5'11, 181); 9 Joey Porter Jr. – CB – (redshirt) freshman (6'2, 193); 15 Enzo Jennings – S – freshman (6'1, 197); 16 Ji'Ayir Brown – S – junior (5'11, 209); 17 Joseph Johnson III – CB – freshman (6'2, 168); 19 Trent Gordon – S – (redshirt) sophomore (5'11, 199); 21 Tyler Rudolph – S – (redshirt) freshman (6'0, 203); 25 Daequan Hardy – CB – (redshirt) freshman (5'9, 180); 27 Jaden Seider – S – (redshirt) freshman (5'10, 174); 29 Sebastian Costantini – CB – (redshirt) freshman (5'11, 185); 32 Dylan Farronato – S – (redshirt) freshman (5'11, 187); 36 Makai Self – CB – (redshirt) freshman (5'9, 170); 37 Drew Hartlaub – S – (redshirt) junior (5'11, 177); 38 Lamont Wade – S – senior (5'9, 191); 48 Cody Romano – S – (redshirt) sophomore (6'2, 207); Long snappers: 49 Michael Wright – freshman (6'1, 197); 91 Chris Stoll – (redshirt) junior (6'2, 242)

== Schedule ==
=== Spring game ===
Date	Time	Network	Spring Game	Site	Result	Attendance
April 18	1:30pm	FS1	Blue vs. White	Beaver Stadium • University Park, PA	Canceled	

Because of the ongoing COVID-19 pandemic, Penn State, like other institutions, switched to distance-learning during the spring semester and canceled all sporting events.

=== Regular season ===
The Nittany Lions are a member of the Big Ten East Division, and will play all of the division's other six members. Cross-divisional opponents include the Iowa Hawkeyes, Northwestern Wildcats, Nebraska Cornhuskers, and Illinois Fighting Illini.

Three out-of-conference opponents were originally scheduled: a road game at Virginia Tech, and home games versus Kent State and San Jose State. However, these non-conference games were canceled on July 9 as a result of ongoing concerns with the COVID-19 pandemic. In early August, the 9-game conference schedule increased to 10 games, adding cross-divisional opponent Illinois.

A week later, the season was promptly postponed. On August 11, in the wake of multiple Group of Five conferences deciding to do so, the council of the Big Ten voted 11–3 to postpone fall athletics for the 2020–21 season (with all but Iowa, Nebraska, and Ohio State voting in favor). Commissioner Kevin Warren cited negative trends and uncertainties surrounding COVID-19 as a factor in the decision. The conference stated that it would evaluate options, including possibly playing in spring 2021 instead. After the decision to postpone the season, the Big Ten formed a taskforce to investigate options for a return to play. President Donald Trump criticized the Big Ten's decision to postpone fall football, as part of his general criticism of U.S. colleges and universities that have not resumed on-campus activities. All other Power Five conferences besides the Pac-12 (which also postponed its season shortly after the Big Ten's decision) were still planning to play in the fall.

On September 14, it was reported that the Big Ten was considering the possibility of reversing its decision and playing a shortened conference football season as early as mid-to-late October. On September 16, the Big Ten approved an eight-game conference season that would begin October 24, and conclude on December 19 (with the top seeds in each division playing for the conference championship, and all other seeds playing similar cross-division matchups). The conference is instituting a daily antigen testing protocol beginning September 30; PCR tests will be used to confirm positives found via antigen testing. Players who test positive on both tests will be removed from play for at least 21 days and undergo cardiac tests during this period, and will have to be cleared by a cardiologist before they can return to play. Positivity rates among participating teams and the local population will also be a factor: teams with a positivity rate above 5% or a population positivity rate above 7% will be required to halt all activity for seven days.

Penn State and Rutgers were the only 2 Big Ten teams to compete in all 9 regular season games. Following their victory over Illinois on December 19, Penn State opted out of a college bowl game appearance.

Date	Time	Opponent	Rank	Site	TV	Result	Attendance
October 24	3:30 p.m.	at Indiana	No. 8	Memorial Stadium; Bloomington, IN	FS1	L 35–36 ^{OT}	995
October 31	7:30 p.m.	No. 3 Ohio State	No. 18	Beaver Stadium; State College, PA (rivalry, College GameDay)	ABC	L 25–38	1,500
November 7	3:30 p.m.	Maryland		Beaver Stadium; State College, PA (rivalry)	BTN	L 19–35	1,500
November 14	12:00 p.m.	at Nebraska		Memorial Stadium; Lincoln, NE	FS1	L 23–30	0
November 21	3:30 p.m.	Iowa		Beaver Stadium; State College, PA	BTN	L 21–41	1,500
November 28	12:00 p.m.	at Michigan		Michigan Stadium; Ann Arbor, MI (rivalry)	ABC	W 27–17	0
December 5	12:00 p.m.	at Rutgers		SHI Stadium; Piscataway, NJ	FS1	W 23–7	0
December 12	12:00 p.m.	Michigan State		Beaver Stadium; State College, PA (rivalry)	ABC	W 39–24	0
December 19	5:30 p.m.	Illinois		Beaver Stadium; State College, PA (Big Ten Champions Week)	FS1	W 56–21	0
Rankings from AP Poll released prior to the game; All times are in Eastern time

== Game summaries ==
=== At Indiana ===
No. 8 Penn State at Indiana – Game summary

Quarter	1	2	3	4	OT	Total
No. 8 Penn State	7	0	7	14	7	35
Indiana	0	17	0	11	8	36

at Memorial Stadium, Bloomington, Indiana

- Date: October 24
- Game time: 3:30 p.m. EDT
- Game weather: 54 °F (12 °C); sunny
- Game attendance: 995
- Referee: Ron Snodgrass
- TV announcers (FS1): Aaron Goldsmith, Mark Helfrich
- ESPN box score, GoPSUsports.com box score

Game information

First quarter

- PSU – Pat Freiermuth, 2-yard TD pass from Sean Clifford, Jake Pinegar kick good, 7:59 (PSU 7–0)

Second quarter

- IU – Charles Campbell, 34-yard field goal, 12:24 (PSU 7–3)
- IU – Stevie Scott III, 14-yard TD run, Campbell kick good, 8:12 (IU 10–7)
- IU – Scott, 2-yard TD run, Campbell kick good, 6:36 (IU 17–7)

Third quarter

- PSU – Clifford, 35-yard TD run, Pinegar kick good, 0:00 (IU 17–14)

Fourth quarter

- IU – Campbell, 49-yard field goal, 13:18 (IU 20–14)
- PSU – Jahan Dotson, 60-yard TD pass from Clifford, Pinegar kick good, 2:30 (PSU 21–20)
- PSU – Devyn Ford, 14-yard TD run, Pinegar kick good, 1:42 (PSU 28–20)
- IU – Michael Penix Jr., 1-yard TD run, Penix run for 2-point conversion, 0:22 (TIE 28–28)

Overtime

- PSU – Parker Washington, 3-yard TD pass from Clifford, Pinegar kick good (PSU 35–28)
- IU – Whop Philyor, 9-yard TD pass from Penix, Penix run for 2-point conversion (IU 36–35)

Top passers

- PSU – Sean Clifford – 24/35, 238 yards, 3 TD, 2 INT
- IU – Michael Penix Jr. – 19/36, 170 yards, TD, INT

Top rushers

- PSU – Sean Clifford – 17 carries, 119 yards, TD
- IU – Stevie Scott III – 20 carries, 57 yards, 2 TD

Top receivers

- PSU – Jahan Dotson – 4 receptions, 94 yards, TD
- IU – Miles Marshall – 4 receptions 46 yards

Top defenders

- PSU – Shaka Toney – 7 tackles, 2 tackles-for-loss (TFL), 2 sacks
- IU – Micah McFadden – 11 tackles, 1 tackle-for-loss (TFL)

=== No. 3 Ohio State ===
No. 3 Ohio State at No. 18 Penn State – Game summary

Quarter	1	2	3	4	Total
No. 3 Ohio State	14	7	10	7	38
No. 18 Penn State	3	3	7	12	25

at Beaver Stadium, University Park, Pennsylvania

- Date: October 31
- Game time: 7:30 p.m. EDT
- Game weather: 41 °F (5 °C); mostly clear
- Game attendance: 1,500
- Referee: Jerry McGinn
- TV announcers (ABC): Chris Fowler, Kirk Herbstreit, Maria Taylor
- ESPN box score, GoPSUsports.com box score

Game information

First quarter

- OSU – Master Teague, 4-yard TD run, Blake Haubeil kick good, 13:43 (OSU 7–0)
- OSU – Chris Olave, 26-yard TD pass from Justin Fields, Haubeil kick good, 8:39 (OSU 14–0)
- PSU – Jake Pinegar, 31-yard field goal, 2:57 (OSU 14–3)

Second quarter

- OSU – Jeremy Ruckert, 10-yard TD pass from Fields, Dominic DiMaccio kick good, 2:23 (OSU 21–3)
- PSU – Jordan Stout, 50-yard field goal, 0:00 (OSU 21–6)

Third quarter

- PSU – Jahan Dotson, 14-yard TD pass from Sean Clifford, Pinegar kick good, 11:14 (OSU 21–13)
- OSU – Olave, 49-yard TD pass from Fields, DiMaccio kick good, 8:41 (OSU 28–13)
- OSU – DiMaccio, 22-yard field goal, 1:02 (OSU 31–13)

Fourth quarter

- PSU – Dotson, 21-yard TD pass from Clifford, 2-point conversion run failed, 14:30 (OSU 31–19)
- OSU – Ruckert, 1-yard TD pass from Fields, DiMaccio kick good, 9:14 (OSU 38–19)
- PSU – Dotson, 20-yard TD pass from Clifford, 2-point conversion pass failed, 6:27 (OSU 38–25)

Top passers

- OSU – Justin Fields – 28/34, 318 yards, 4 TD
- PSU – Sean Clifford – 18/30, 281 yards, 3 TD, INT

Top rushers

- OSU – Master Teague – 23 carries, 110 yards, TD
- PSU – Devyn Ford – 8 carries, 36 yards

Top receivers

- OSU – Chris Olave – 7 receptions, 120 yards, 2 TD
- PSU – Jahan Dotson – 8 receptions, 144 yards, 3 TD

Top defenders

- OSU – Tommy Togiai – 7 tackles, 3 tackles-for-loss (TFL), 3 sacks
- PSU – Ellis Brooks – 11 tackles, 1 tackle-for-loss (TFL)

=== Maryland ===
Maryland at Penn State – Game summary

Quarter	1	2	3	4	Total
Maryland	14	14	7	0	35
Penn State	0	7	0	12	19

at Beaver Stadium, University Park, Pennsylvania

- Date: November 7
- Game time: 3:30 p.m. EST
- Game weather: 72 °F (22 °C); mostly sunny
- Game attendance: 1,500
- Referee: Reggie Smith
- TV announcers (BTN): Lisa Byington, Matt Millen, Coley Harvey, Dean Blandino
- ESPN box score, GoPSUsports.com box score

Game information

First quarter

- UM – Rakim Jarrett, 42-yard TD pass from Taulia Tagovailoa, Joseph Petrino kick good, 12:27 (UM 7–0)
- UM – Jarrett, 62-yard TD pass from Tagovailoa, Petrino kick good, 0:19 (UM 14–0)

Second quarter

- UM – Jake Funk, 38-yard TD run, Petrino kick good, 11:49 (UM 21–0)
- PSU – Jahan Dotson, 20-yard TD pass from Sean Clifford, Jake Pinegar kick good, 6:32 (UM 21–7)
- UM – Dontay Demus Jr., 34-yard TD pass from Tagovailoa, Petrino kick good, 0:45 (UM 28–7)

Third quarter

- UM – Chance Campbell, 29-yard fumble return for TD, Petrino kick good, 12:55 (UM 35–7)

Fourth quarter

- PSU – Parker Washington, 23-yard TD pass from Clifford, 2-point conversion failed, 10:16 (UM 35–13)
- PSU – Washington, 1-yard TD pass from Clifford, 2-point conversion pass incomplete, 0:11 (UM 35–19)

Top passers

- UM – Taulia Tagovailoa – 18/26, 282 yards, 3 TD
- PSU – Sean Clifford – 27/57, 340 yards, 3 TD, 2 INT

Top rushers

- UM – Jake Funk – 16 carries, 80 yards, TD
- PSU – Devyn Ford – 9 carries, 36 yards

Top receivers

- UM – Rakim Jarrett – 5 receptions, 144 yards, 2 TD
- PSU – Jahan Dotson – 9 receptions, 123 yards, TD

Top defenders

- UM – Nick Cross – 8 tackles, 1 tackle-for-loss (TFL), 1 sack
- PSU – Odafe Oweh – 10 tackles, 2 tackles-for-loss (TFL)

=== At Nebraska ===
Penn State at Nebraska – Game summary

Quarter	1	2	3	4	Total
Penn State	0	6	10	7	23
Nebraska	10	17	0	3	30

at Memorial Stadium, Lincoln, Nebraska

- Date: November 14
- Game time: 12:00 p.m. EST
- Game weather: 52 °F (11 °C); mostly sunny
- Game attendance: 0
- Referee: Larry Smith
- TV announcers (FS1): Brian Custer, Robert Smith
- ESPN box score, GoPSUsports.com box score

Game information

First quarter

- UN – Luke McCaffrey, 1-yard TD run, Connor Culp kick good, 11:25 (UN 7–0)
- UN – Culp, 22-yard field goal, 6:14 (UN 10–0)

Second quarter

- PSU – Jake Pinegar, 33-yard field goal, 14:50 (UN 10–3)
- UN – Zavier Betts, 45-yard TD pass from McCaffrey, Culp kick good, 14:01 (UN 17–3)
- UN – Deontai Williams, 26-yard fumble recovery, Culp kick good, 11:29 (UN 24–3)
- PSU – Pinegar, 40-yard field goal, 5:48 (UN 24–6)
- UN – Culp, 25-yard field goal, 0:00 (UN 27–6)

Third quarter

- PSU – Keyvone Lee, 31-yard TD run, Pinegar kick good, 7:51 (UN 27–13)
- PSU – Pinegar, 27-yard field goal, 1:01 (UN 27–16)

Fourth quarter

- UN – Culp, 30-yard field goal, 10:34 (UN 30–16)
- PSU – Devyn Ford, 5-yard TD run, Pinegar kick good, 9:20 (UN 30–23)

Top passers

- PSU – Will Levis – 14/31, 219 yards
- UN – Luke McCaffrey – 13/21, 152 yards, TD, INT

Top rushers

- PSU – Devyn Ford – 16 carries, 66 yards, TD
- UN – Luke McCaffrey – 13 carries, 67 yards, TD

Top receivers

- PSU – Pat Freiermuth – 7 receptions, 113 yards
- UN – Zavier Betts – 2 receptions, 54 yards, TD

Top defenders

- PSU – Odafe Oweh – 9 tackles, 1.5 tackles-for-loss (TFL)
- UN – Marquel Dismuke – 15 tackles, 1 tackle-for-loss (TFL)

=== Iowa ===
Iowa at Penn State – Game summary

Quarter	1	2	3	4	Total
Iowa	3	21	7	10	41
Penn State	7	0	14	0	21

at Beaver Stadium, University Park, Pennsylvania

- Date: November 21
- Game time: 3:30 p.m. EST
- Game weather: 54 °F (12 °C); cloudy, rain
- Game attendance: 1,500
- Referee: Mark Kluczynski
- TV announcers (BTN): Joe Beninati, Matt Millen, Rick Pizzo
- ESPN box score, GoPSUsports.com box score

Game information

First quarter

- UI – Keith Duncan, 40-yard field goal, 8:23 (UI 3–0)
- PSU – Keyvone Lee, 6-yard TD run, Jake Pinegar kick good, 2:12 (PSU 7–3)

Second quarter

- UI – Tyler Goodson, 10-yard TD run, Duncan kick good, 14:35 (UI 10–7)
- UI – Mekhi Sargent, 1-yard TD run, Duncan kick good, 6:34 (UI 17–7)
- UI – Sargent, 1-yard TD run, Duncan kick good, 0:11 (UI 24–7)

Third quarter

- UI – Spencer Petras, 3-yard TD run, Duncan kick good, 6:45 (UI 31–7)
- PSU – Brenton Strange, 28-yard TD pass from Sean Clifford, Pinegar kick blocked, 4:01 (UI 31–13)
- PSU – Jahan Dotson, 68-yard TD pass from Clifford, 2-point conversion pass to Lee, 0:07 (UI 31–21)

Fourth quarter

- UI – Duncan, 24-yard field goal, 7:14 (UI 34–21)
- UI – Daviyon Nixon, 71-yard interception return, Duncan kick good, 1:58 (UI 41–21)

Top passers

- UI – Spencer Petras – 18/28, 186 yards
- PSU – Sean Clifford – 13/22, 174 yards, 2 TD, 2 INT

Top rushers

- UI – Mekhi Sargent – 15 carries, 101 yards, 2 TD
- PSU – Will Levis – 15 carries, 34 yards

Top receivers

- UI – Nico Ragaini – 4 receptions, 46 yards
- PSU – Jahan Dotson – 8 receptions, 139 yards, TD

Top defenders

- UI – Nick Niemann – 17 tackles, 1 tackle-for-loss (TFL)
- PSU – Lamont Wade – 10 tackles

=== At Michigan ===
Penn State at Michigan – Game summary

Quarter	1	2	3	4	Total
Penn State	7	10	3	7	27
Michigan	7	0	3	7	17

at Michigan Stadium, Ann Arbor, Michigan

- Date: November 28
- Game time: 12:00 p.m. EST
- Game weather: 45 °F (7 °C); sunny
- Game attendance: 0
- Referee: Larry Smith
- TV announcers (ABC): Dave Pasch, Mike Golic, Paul Carcaterra
- ESPN box score, GoPSUsports.com box score

Game information

First quarter

- PSU – Keyvone Lee, 6-yard TD run, Jake Pinegar kick good, 10:50 (PSU 7–0)
- UM – Hassan Haskins, 2-yard TD run, Jake Moody kick good, 0:30 (TIE 7–7)

Second quarter

- PSU – Sean Clifford, 28-yard TD run, Pinegar kick good, 3:32 (PSU 14–7)
- PSU – Pinegar, 22-yard field goal, 0:15 (PSU 17–7)

Third quarter

- UM – Moody, 40-yard field goal, 9:10 (PSU 17–10)
- PSU – Pinegar, 33-yard field goal, 0:40 (PSU 20–10)

Fourth quarter

- UM – Haskins, 2-yard TD run, Moody kick good, 13:12 (PSU 20–17)
- PSU – Will Levis, 2-yard TD run, Pinegar kick good, 8:12 (PSU 27–17)

Top passers

- PSU – Sean Clifford – 17/28, 163 yards
- UM – Cade McNamara – 12/25, 91 yards

Top rushers

- PSU – Keyvone Lee – 22 carries, 134 yards, TD
- UM – Hassan Haskins – 17 carries, 101 yards, 2 TD

Top receivers

- PSU – Parker Washington – 9 receptions, 93 yards
- UM – Ronnie Bell – 4 receptions, 40 yards

Top defenders

- PSU – Ellis Brooks – 6 tackles
- UM – Josh Ross – 12 tackles

=== At Rutgers ===
Penn State at Rutgers – Game summary

Quarter	1	2	3	4	Total
Penn State	7	10	3	3	23
Rutgers	0	0	7	0	7

at SHI Stadium, Piscataway, New Jersey

- Date: December 5
- Game time: 12:00 p.m. EST
- Game weather: 44 °F (7 °C); rain, partly cloudy
- Game attendance: 0
- Referee: John O'Neill
- TV announcers (FS1): Mark Followill, Matt Millen, Olivia Dekker
- ESPN box score, GoPSUsports.com box score

Game information

First quarter

- PSU – Parker Washington, 29-yard TD pass from Sean Clifford, Jake Pinegar kick good, 3:32 (PSU 7–0)

Second quarter

- PSU – Pinegar, 30-yard field goal, 11:37 (PSU 10–0)
- PSU – Devyn Ford, 7-yard TD run, Pinegar kick good, 6:21 (PSU 17–0)

Third quarter

- PSU – Jordan Stout, 47-yard field goal, 11:38 (PSU 20–0)
- RU – Bo Melton, 3-yard TD pass from Noah Vedral, Valentino Ambrosio kick good, 4:56 (PSU 20–7)

Fourth quarter

- PSU – Pinegar, 27-yard field goal, 7:27 (PSU 23–7)

Top passers

- PSU – Sean Clifford – 15/22, 133 yards, TD, INT
- RU – Noah Vedral – 17/30, 133 yards, TD

Top rushers

- PSU – Keyvone Lee – 17 carries, 95 yards
- RU – Noah Vedral – 14 carries, 56 yards

Top receivers

- PSU – Jahan Dotson – 4 receptions, 30 yards
- RU – Bo Melton – 7 receptions, 38 yards, TD

Top defenders

- PSU – Jesse Luketa – 10 tackles, 1 tackle-for-loss (TFL)
- RU – Olakunle Fatukasi – 17 tackles, 1 tackle-for-loss (TFL)

=== Michigan State ===
Michigan State at Penn State – Game summary

Quarter	1	2	3	4	Total
Michigan State	0	21	3	0	24
Penn State	3	7	15	14	39

at Beaver Stadium, University Park, Pennsylvania

- Date: December 12
- Game time: 12:00 p.m. EST
- Game weather: 45 °F (7 °C); partly cloudy
- Game attendance: 0
- Referee: Ron Snodgrass
- TV announcers (ABC): Dave Flemming, Rod Gilmore, Paul Carcaterra
- ESPN box score, GoPSUsports.com box score

Game information

First quarter

- PSU – Jake Pinegar, 24-yard field goal, 6:06 (PSU 3–0)

Second quarter

- MSU – Jalen Nailor, 45-yard TD pass from Payton Thorne, Matt Coghlin kick good, 13:50 (MSU 7–3)
- PSU – Sean Clifford, 31-yard TD run, Pinegar kick good, 10:00 (PSU 10–7)
- MSU – Tre'Von Morgan, 26-yard TD pass from Thorne, Coghlin kick good, 6:24 (MSU 14–10)
- MSU – Nailor, 7-yard TD pass from Thorne, Coghlin kick good, 1:26 (MSU 21–10)

Third quarter

- PSU – Parker Washington, 8-yard TD pass from Clifford, Jahan Dotson 2-point conversion pass from Clifford, 10:07 (MSU 21–18)
- MSU – Coghlin, 23-yard field goal, 1:59 (MSU 24–18)
- PSU – Will Levis, 1-yard TD run, Pinegar kick good, 0:02 (PSU 25–24)

Fourth quarter

- PSU – Washington, 49-yard TD pass from Clifford, Pinegar kick good, 12:18 (PSU 32–24)
- PSU – Dotson, 81-yard punt return for TD, Pinegar kick good, 11:24 (PSU 39–24)

Top passers

- MSU – Payton Thorne – 22/39, 325 yards, 3 TD, INT
- PSU – Sean Clifford – 17/27, 232 yards, 2 TD

Top rushers

- MSU – Jordon Simmons – 14 carries, 72 yards
- PSU – Sean Clifford – 9 carries, 48 yards, TD

Top receivers

- MSU – Jalen Nailor – 6 receptions, 100 yards, 2 TD
- PSU – Jahan Dotson – 8 receptions, 106 yards

Top defenders

- MSU – Antjuan Simmons – 10 tackles, 0.5 tackles-for-loss (TFL)
- PSU – Jaquan Brisker – 9 tackles, 1.5 tackles-for-loss (TFL), INT

=== Illinois ===
Illinois at Penn State – Game summary

Quarter	1	2	3	4	Total
Illinois	21	0	0	0	21
Penn State	21	21	7	7	56

at Beaver Stadium, University Park, Pennsylvania

- Date: December 19
- Game time: 5:30 p.m. EST
- Game weather: 30 °F (−1 °C); cloudy
- Game attendance: 0
- Referee: John O'Neill
- TV announcers (FS1): Cory Provus, Robert Smith
- ESPN box score, GoPSUsports.com box score

Game information

First quarter

- PSU – Jahan Dotson, 75-yard TD pass from Sean Clifford, Jake Pinegar kick good, 14:48 (PSU 7–0)
- UI – Brian Hightower, 5-yard TD pass from Isaiah Williams, James McCourt kick good, 11:06 (TIE 7–7)
- PSU – Lamont Wade, 100-yard kickoff return for TD, Pinegar kick good, 10:51 (PSU 14–7)
- UI – Chase Brown, 12-yard TD run, McCourt kick good, 9:50 (TIE 14–14)
- UI – Daniel Barker, 38-yard TD pass from Williams, McCourt kick good, 6:10 (UI 21–14)
- PSU – Will Levis, 4-yard TD run, Pinegar kick good, 1:13 (TIE 21–21)

Second quarter

- PSU – Caziah Holmes, 3-yard TD run, Pinegar kick good, 14:04 (PSU 28–21)
- PSU – Keyvone Lee, 1-yard TD run, Pinegar kick good, 5:32 (PSU 35–21)
- PSU – Dotson, 70-yard TD pass from Clifford, Pinegar kick good, 3:49 (PSU 42–21)

Third quarter

- PSU – Brenton Strange, 7-yard TD pass from Levis, Pinegar kick good, 0:20 (PSU 49–21)

Fourth quarter

- PSU – Holmes, 1-yard TD run, Pinegar kick good, 3:32 (PSU 56–21)

Top passers

- UI – Isaiah Williams – 8/18, 120 yards, 2 TD, INT
- PSU – Sean Clifford – 16/22, 285 yards, 2 TD

Top rushers

- UI – Isaiah Williams – 15 carries, 102 yards
- PSU – Keyvone Lee – 19 carries, 85 yards, TD

Top receivers

- UI – Daniel Barker – 3 receptions, 54 yards, TD
- PSU – Jahan Dotson – 6 receptions, 189 yards, 2 TD

Top defenders

- UI – Quan Martin – 12 tackles
- PSU – Brandon Smith – 8 tackles, 3 tackles-for-loss (TFL)

== Statistics ==
=== Scores by quarter (Big Ten opponents) ===
	1	2	3	4	OT	Total
Big Ten opponents	69	97	37	38	8	249
Penn State	55	64	66	76	7	268

== Rankings ==
Ranking movements Legend: ██ Increase in ranking ██ Decrease in ranking — = Not ranked RV = Received votes
	Week																	
Poll	Pre	1	2	3	4	5	6	7	8	9	10	11	12	13	14	15	16	Final
AP	7	7*	—	—	10	9	9	8	18	RV	—	—	—	—	—	—	—	—
Coaches	7	7*	—	13	10	8	8	7	17	RV	—	—	—	—	—	—	—	—
CFP	Not released												—	—	—	—	—	Not released

== Players drafted into the NFL ==
Round	Pick	Player	Position	NFL club
1	12	Micah Parsons	LB	Dallas Cowboys
1	31	Odafe Oweh	DE	Baltimore Ravens
2	55	Pat Freiermuth	TE	Pittsburgh Steelers
7	246	Shaka Toney	DE	Washington Football Team
7	247	Michal Menet	C	Arizona Cardinals
7	248	Will Fries	OG	Indianapolis Colts

=== Undrafted players ===
Player	Position	NFL club
Lamont Wade	S	Pittsburgh Steelers
