= Tyler Warren =

American football player (born 2002)

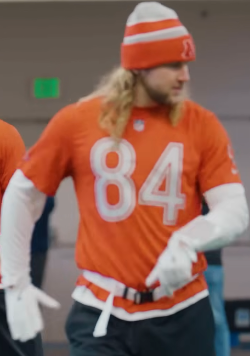
- Warren at the 2026 Pro Bowl Games

No. 84 – Indianapolis Colts
- Position: Tight end
- Roster status: Active

Personal information
- Born: May 24, 2002 (age 24); Mechanicsville, Virginia, U.S.
- Listed height: 6 ft 6 in (1.98 m)
- Listed weight: 256 lb (116 kg)

Career information
- High school: Atlee (Mechanicsville)
- College: Penn State (2020–2024)
- NFL draft: 2025: 1st round, 14th overall pick

Career history
- Indianapolis Colts (2025–present)

Awards and highlights
- Pro Bowl (2025); PFWA All-Rookie Team (2025); John Mackey Award (2024); First-team All-American (2024); First-team All-Big Ten (2024); Third-team All-Big Ten (2023)

Career NFL statistics as of Week 11, 2026
- Receptions: 117
- Receiving yards: 1,115
- Receiving touchdowns: 6
- Rushing touchdowns: 2
- Stats at Pro Football Reference

Tyler William Warren (born May 24, 2002) is an American professional football tight end for the Indianapolis Colts of the National Football League (NFL). He played college football for the Penn State Nittany Lions, winning the John Mackey Award in 2024 prior to being selected by the Colts in the first round of the 2025 NFL draft.

== Early life ==
Warren was born in Mechanicsville, Virginia, on May 24, 2002. He attended Atlee High School in Mechanicsville, where he played baseball, basketball, and was the starting quarterback on the football team. He threw for 876 yards and nine touchdowns and also rushed for 554 yards and seven touchdowns during his junior season. As a senior, Warren passed for 1,149 yards and 14 touchdowns while also rushing for 677 yards and 10 touchdowns. Warren initially committed to play college football at Virginia Tech over offers from Virginia and Syracuse, but later decommitted and reopened his recruitment. He later signed to play at Penn State.

== College career ==
Warren played in two games during his true freshman season with Penn State while maintaining a redshirt on the year. He played both tight end and fullback as a redshirt freshman and had five receptions for 61 yards and one touchdown and also rushed six times for six yards and two touchdowns. Warren caught 10 passes for 123 yards and three touchdowns during his redshirt sophomore season. He tied a college football record for tight ends with 17 receptions against USC. At the conclusion of the 2024 regular season he won the John Mackey Award as the nation's top tight end.

== Professional career ==
Pre-draft measurables
Height	Weight	Arm length	Hand span	Wingspan
6 ft 5 1/2 in (1.97 m)	256 lb (116 kg)	31 3/4 in (0.81 m)	9 1/2 in (0.24 m)	6 ft 4 1/2 in (1.94 m)
All values from NFL Combine

In the 2025 NFL draft, Warren was drafted in the first round by the Indianapolis Colts with the 14th overall pick.

Warren had a strong start in his rookie season. He was named the Pepsi NFL Rookie of the Week in Week 2 with 79 receiving yards on four receptions. Warren led all tight ends in reception yards through the first eight weeks of the season. He also served as the Colts' emergency quarterback. He finished the 2025 season with 76 receptions for 817 yards and four touchdowns.

== Career statistics ==
Legend
**Bold**	Career high

=== NFL ===
NFL statistics
Year	Team	Games		Receiving					Rushing					Passing							Fumbles	
Year	Team	GP	GS	Rec	Yds	Avg	Lng	TD	Att	Yds	Avg	Lng	TD	Cmp	Att	Pct	Yds	TD	Int	Rtg	Fum	Lost
2025	IND	17	12	76	817	10.8	41	4	6	8	1.3	3	1	0	1	0.0	0	0	0	39.6	1	0
2026	IND	9	8	41	298	7.3	29	2	4	9	2.3	3	1	0	0	0.0	0	0	0	0.0	0	0
Career		26	20	117	1,115	9.5	41	6	10	17	1.7	3	2	0	1	0.0	0	0	0	39.6	1	0

=== College ===
College statistics
Season	Team	Games		Receiving				Rushing			
Season	Team	GP	GS	Rec	Yds	Avg	TD	Att	Yds	Avg	TD
2020	Penn State	2	0	0	0	0.0	0	0	0	0.0	0
2021	Penn State	13	0	5	61	12.2	1	6	6	1.0	2
2022	Penn State	12	3	10	123	12.3	3	0	0	0.0	0
2023	Penn State	13	12	34	422	**12.5**	7	0	0	0.0	0
2024	Penn State	16	16	**104**	**1,233**	11.9	**8**	**26**	**218**	**8.4**	**4**
Career		56	31	153	1,839	12.0	19	32	224	7.0	6
