= Nick Dawkins =

American football player (born 2002)

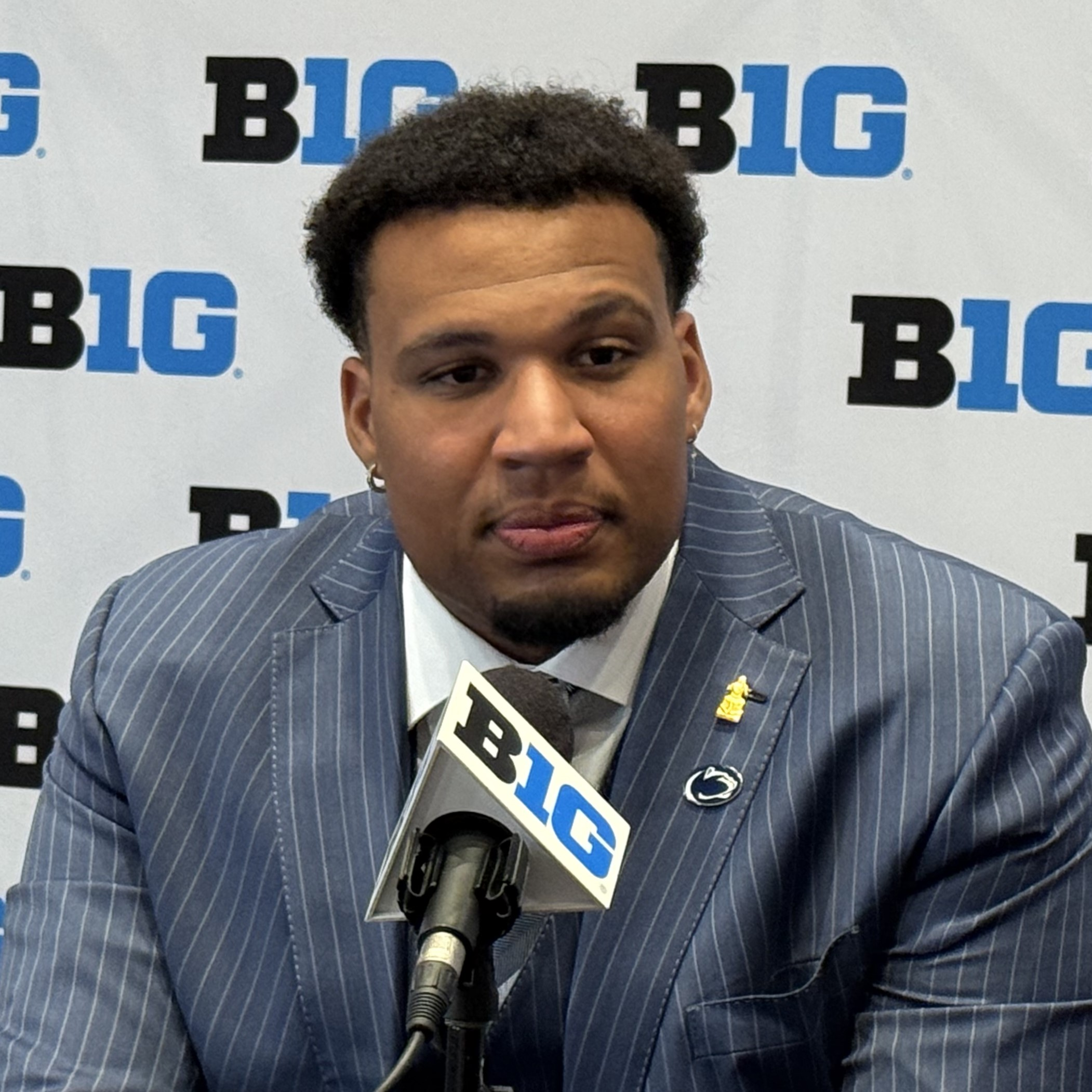
- Dawkins at 2025 Big Ten Media Day

No. 53 – New York Jets
- Position: Center
- Roster status: Practice squad

Personal information
- Born: May 7, 2002 (age 24)
- Listed height: 6 ft 4 in (1.93 m)
- Listed weight: 305 lb (138 kg)

Career information
- High school: Parkland (Allentown, Pennsylvania)
- College: Penn State (2022–2025)
- NFL draft: 2026: undrafted

Career history
- Baltimore Ravens (2026)*; New York Jets (2026–present)*
- * Offseason or practice squad member only

Awards and highlights
- Wuerffel Trophy (2024)
- Stats at Pro Football Reference

Nicholas Paul Dawkins (born May 7, 2002) is an American professional football center for the New York Jets of the National Football League (NFL). He played college football at Penn State.

== Early life ==
Dawkins attended Parkland High School in Allentown, Pennsylvania. He was rated as a three-star recruit and committed to play college football for the Penn State Nittany Lions over offers from schools such as Indiana, Northwestern, Boston College, Louisville, Pittsburgh, Tennessee, Vanderbilt, and West Virginia.

== College career ==
During Dawkins first four seasons from 2020 through 2023, he appeared in 26 games for the Nittany Lions with no starts as he played behind future NFL draft picks such as Michal Menet, Juice Scruggs, and Hunter Nourzad. Ahead of the 2024 season, he finally became a starter for the Nittany Lions, becoming the team's starting center for the first time. Dawkins was also named a team captain. In 2024, Dawkins started in all of Penn State's games including their three playoff matchups, earning honorable mention all-Big Ten Conference honors. He was also honored for his work off the field being named the winner of the Wuerffel Trophy and being named to the AFCA Good Works Team.

== Professional career ==
Pre-draft measurables
| Height | Weight | Arm length | Hand span | Wingspan | 40-yard dash | 10-yard split | 20-yard split | Vertical jump | Broad jump |
|---|---|---|---|---|---|---|---|---|---|
| 6 ft 4 3/8 in (1.94 m) | 305 lb (138 kg) | 33 3/4 in (0.86 m) | 9 7/8 in (0.25 m) | 6 ft 7 7/8 in (2.03 m) | 5.22 s | 1.77 s | 2.96 s | 33.0 in (0.84 m) | 9 ft 4 in (2.84 m) |
All values from Pro Day

=== Baltimore Ravens ===
Dawkins signed with the Baltimore Ravens as an undrafted free agent on April 26, 2026. On August 30, Dawkins was waived by Baltimore as a part of final roster cuts; he was re-signed to the team's practice squad the next day. On September 3, Dawkins was released from the practice squad.

=== New York Jets ===
On September 29, 2026, Dawkins signed with the New York Jets practice squad.

== Personal life ==
Dawkins is the son of former NBA champion Darryl Dawkins. He is also the cousin of Hall of Fame defensive back Brian Dawkins and NBA all-star Karl-Anthony Towns.
