= Jaxon Smolik =

American football player (born 2004)

No. 14 – Temple Owls
- Position: Quarterback
- Class: (redshirt) Junior

Personal information
- Born: 2004 (age 21–22); West Des Moines, Iowa, U.S.
- Listed height: 6 ft 1 in (1.85 m)
- Listed weight: 205 lb (93 kg)

Career information
- High school: Dowling Catholic (West Des Moines, Iowa)
- College: Penn State (2023–2025); Temple (2026–present)
- Stats at ESPN

Jaxon James Smolik (born 2004) is an American college football quarterback for the Temple Owls. He previously played for the Penn State Nittany Lions.

== Early life and education ==
Smolik was born in West Des Moines, Iowa, where he attended Dowling Catholic High School. As a sophomore, he completed 57 of 96 passes for 794 yards and six touchdowns. As a junior, he completed about 65% of his passes for 959 yards and nine touchdowns. As a senior, he completed 64% of his passes for 1,967 yards and 19 touchdowns, leading Dowling Catholic to a 10-2 record and a state-semifinal appearance.

He earned 5A all-state honors as a senior, was selected all-conference and also received Academic All-State recognition.

In addition to football, he played baseball at Dowling Catholic, serving as a first-baseman and pitcher.

Smolik was rated a consensus three-star prospect out of high school. On August 12, 2022, he committed to play college football for Penn State.

== College career ==
=== Penn State ===
Smolik enrolled at Penn State and redshirted his true-freshman year in 2023; he appeared in one game during that season. During the 2024 season, Smolik was sidelined with an injury and did not appear in games, entering the season as a redshirt freshman. During the 2025 season, he saw his first extended action against Iowa on October 18, taking 11 snaps and recording four rushes for three yards before leaving the game in the fourth quarter after a hit.

On January 2, 2026, Smolik announced that he would enter the transfer portal.

=== Temple ===
On January 10, 2026, Smolik announced that he would transfer to Temple.

=== Statistics ===
Year	Team	Games			Passing								Rushing			
Year	Team	GP	GS	Record	Cmp	Att	Pct	Yds	Y/A	TD	Int	Rtg	Att	Yds	Avg	TD
2023	Penn State	1	0	—	0	0	0.0	0	0.0	0	0	0.0	0	0	0.0	0
2024	Penn State	0	0	—	0	0	0.0	0	0.0	0	0	0.0	0	0	0.0	0
2025	Penn State	3	0	—	0	0	0.0	0	0.0	0	0	0.0	4	3	0.8	0
2026	Temple	4	3	1−2	16	27	59.3	129	4.8	1	1	104.4	18	81	4.5	0
Career		8	3	1−2	16	27	59.3	129	4.8	1	1	104.2	22	84	3.8	0

== Personal life ==
Smolik is the son of Mark and Jaime Smolik. His father played college football at South Dakota and his brother Cameron played at Dordt University.
