= Darnell Dinkins =

American football player and coach (born 1977)

No. 41, 80, 87, 89
- Position: Tight end

Personal information
- Born: January 20, 1977 (age 49); Pittsburgh, Pennsylvania, U.S.
- Listed height: 6 ft 4 in (1.93 m)
- Listed weight: 260 lb (118 kg)

Career information
- High school: Schenley (Pittsburgh)
- College: Pittsburgh
- NFL draft: 2000: undrafted

Career history

Playing
- Pittsburgh Colts (2001); Rhein Fire (2002); New York Giants (2002–2003); Baltimore Ravens (2004–2005); Cleveland Browns (2006–2008); New Orleans Saints (2009)

Coaching
- Tampa Bay Buccaneers (2010–2011) Assistant tight ends; Rutgers (2012) Tight ends

Awards and highlights
- Super Bowl champion (XLIV)

Career NFL statistics
- Receptions: 30
- Receiving yards: 250
- Receiving touchdowns: 4
- Stats at Pro Football Reference

Darnell Joseph Dinkins (born January 20, 1977) is an American former professional football player who was a tight end in the National Football League (NFL). He played college football for the Pittsburgh Panthers. Dinkins played in the NFL for the New York Giants, Baltimore Ravens, Cleveland Browns, and New Orleans Saints. He was later the tight ends coach for the Rutgers Scarlet Knights.

== Early life ==
A standout quarterback and linebacker at Schenley High School in Pittsburgh, Pennsylvania, Dinkins was named City League MVP by both the Pittsburgh Post-Gazette and the Pittsburgh Courier and a member of the 1995 Big 33 Team. As a senior, he rushed for 435 yards and three touchdowns on 26 carries and threw 113 passes for 1,256 yards and ten touchdowns. On defense, he had 86 tackles, three knockdowns, four sacks and four fumble recoveries (one for a touchdown).

== College career ==
At the University of Pittsburgh as an undergraduate, Dinkins played for Pittsburgh Panthers football from 1996 to 1998 after redshirting the 1995 season. Dinkins played at quarterback and wide receiver in 1996. Then in 1997 and 1998, he started at free safety. He started all 11 games in 1998 at free safety, finishing second on the team with 78 tackles (49 solo), also posting six pass deflections, two quarterback hurries and one forced fumble. Dinkins sat out what would have been his senior season in 1999 after injuring his back during fall camp.

== Semi-pro career ==
While working as a juvenile probation officer for Allegheny County, Pennsylvania, Dinkins played for the Pittsburgh Colts, a minor league football team in North American Football League in 2001.

== Professional career ==
=== New York Giants ===
On February 6, 2002, Dinkins signed with the New York Giants as a free agent. Nearly two weeks later, he was allocated to the Rhein Fire of NFL Europe. When he returned to the Giants, he saw action in two games, missing the final 13 games after breaking a bone in his foot. He was inactive for games 4–7 before being placed on injured reserve. He made his NFL debut against the San Francisco 49ers on September 5, 2002.

In 2003, Dinkins saw action in seven games after being signed to the Giants active roster from the practice squad in week 10. He finished the season with two receptions for 16 yards and eight special teams tackles.

=== Baltimore Ravens ===
Dinkins was waived by the Giants at the end of the training camp in 2004 and was signed by the Baltimore Ravens on October 2, 2004, to their practice squad before being elevated to the active roster on October 29, 2004. He played in ten games, starting four (the first starts of his career), in his first year with the Ravens. He was a key contributor for Baltimore as he pulled in nine receptions for 94 yards and one touchdown. He scored his first career touchdown on a 17-yard pass from Kyle Boller versus the Dallas Cowboys on November 21.

In 2005, his second season with the Ravens, Dinkins appeared in all 16 games, including four starts, and totaled 55 yards on six receptions (9.2 avg.).

=== Cleveland Browns ===
Dinkins was signed by the Cleveland Browns as an unrestricted free agent on March 19, 2006. He played in 14 games with two starts and averaged seven yards per reception and one touchdown. He is known more for his size and blocking than his receiving ability.

Although not starting a single game in 2007 for the first time in four years, he appeared in a total of 15 games. His offensive totals for the season were one reception for eight yards (8.0 avg., which he recorded in Week 1 against the Pittsburgh Steelers. The only game in which he did not see action was the Week 6 game against the Miami Dolphins.

In 2008, Dinkins caught his second career touchdown, with 2:15 left in the second quarter during the Week 6 game against the defending Super Bowl Champions, the New York Giants. He caught a 22-yard pass from quarterback Derek Anderson while filling in for injured tight end Kellen Winslow. It was his first reception of the 2008 campaign.

In late 2008, Dinkins, with fellow Browns player Joshua Cribbs, opened a children's indoor inflatable play arena called Bounce City, which is located in Strongsville, Ohio.

=== New Orleans Saints ===
Dinkins signed with the New Orleans Saints on March 18, 2009. Dinkins may be best remembered for his touchdown catch against the Patriots on Monday Night Football on November 30, 2009.

== Post-playing career ==
In 2010 and 2011, Dinkins served as assistant tight ends coach for the Tampa Bay Buccaneers under head coach Raheem Morris. Then in 2012, Dinkins was tight ends coach at Rutgers.

Also in 2011, Dinkins was a color commentator for the Pittsburgh Power of the Arena Football League on KDKA-FM.

== Personal life ==
Dinkins's son Khalil Dinkins plays as a tight end for the San Francisco 49ers.
