= Landon Tengwall =

American sports journalist

- Born: July 19, 2002 (age 23); Annapolis, Maryland, U.S.
- Education: Pennsylvania State University (BA)
- Occupation: Sports journalist
- Known for: The Landon Tengwall Show
- Height: 6 ft 6 in (198 cm)
- Website: behindthewall.media

Landon Tengwall is an American sports journalist, host, and former football player. He is known for his coverage and analysis of Penn State football. Tengwall is the host and creator of The Landon Tengwall Show (formerly Behind the Wall with Landon Tengwall).

== Playing career ==
Tengwall started his high school career at St. Vincent Pallotti High School in Laurel, Maryland as 2017 as a left tackle. He was the only freshman selected to the MIAA First Team All Conference. Tengwall transferred to Our Lady of Good Counsel High School in 2018 where he started at right tackle. Tengwall returned to the left tackle position in 2019, helping Good Counsel to win the WCAC Championship 16–14. While Tengwall's senior year was canceled due to the COVID-19 pandemic, he was selected to the USA Today All-USA High School Football preseason first team.

Starting his college career, Tengwall was rated as a 4-star recruit by ESPN. At No. 53 overall, he was the highest-rated recruit of the Penn State recruiting class of 2021. In 2021, Tengwall played sparingly, only seeing the field in three games in his redshirt season as a true freshman. 2022 saw Tengwall starting in 5 games as left guard in his redshirt freshman season. Tengwall was awarded offensive player of the game by the coaching staff in his third game of the season against Auburn. He was sidelined after his fifth game for the remainder of the 2022 season following a shoulder injury.

Tengwall announced his retirement from football prior to the 2023 season due to concussion-related injuries. Despite his sudden retirement, he received an outpouring of support from coaches and teammates; head coach James Franklin remarking, "I think you’ll see him, whether it’s coaching or whether it’s recruiting or whether it’s strength and conditioning."

== Broadcasting career ==
Following Tengwall's medical retirement from football, he remained at the university to complete his bachelor's degree in broadcast journalism, graduating in 2025. In the spring of 2024, he launched Behind the Wall with Landon Tengwall, a video podcast show that includes studio interviews with former players and football minds, as well as game breakdowns and film studies.
