= Cam Miller (cornerback) =

American football player (born 2003)

Profile
- Position: Cornerback

Personal information
- Listed height: 6 ft 0 in (1.83 m)
- Listed weight: 192 lb (87 kg)

Career information
- High school: Trinity Christian (Jacksonville, Florida)
- College: Penn State (2021–2024); Rutgers (2025)
- NFL draft: 2026: undrafted

Career history
- Carolina Panthers (2026)*
- * Offseason or practice squad member only
- Stats at Pro Football Reference

Cam'Ron Michael Roberts Miller is an American football cornerback. He played college football for the Penn State Nittany Lions and for the Rutgers Scarlet Knights.

== Early life ==
Miller attended Fernandina Beach High School for three seasons and had 1,039 yards and 16 touchdowns as a junior. For his senior season, he transferred to Trinity Christian Academy located in Jacksonville, Florida. He was rated as a four-star recruit by 247Sports and committed to play college football for the Penn State Nittany Lions over Virginia Tech.

== College career ==
=== Penn State ===
As a freshman in 2022, Miller played in 11 games. In 2023, he totaled 24 tackles, three sacks, and an interception in 13 games in a backup role. Miller entered the 2024 season, in line to earn a starting spot in the Penn State secondary. In 2024, he appeared in all 16 games with four starts, totaling 27 tackles with four going for a loss, a sack, and five pass deflections. After the conclusion of the season, Miller entered the NCAA transfer portal.

=== Rutgers ===
Miller transferred to play for the Rutgers Scarlet Knights. In 2025, he posted 47 tackles with two and a half being for a loss, a sack, six pass deflections, an interception, and a touchdown.

== Professional career ==
Pre-draft measurables
Height	Weight	Arm length	Hand span	Wingspan	40-yard dash	10-yard split	20-yard split	20-yard shuttle	Three-cone drill	Vertical jump	Broad jump	Bench press
5 ft 11 1/2 in (1.82 m)	185 lb (84 kg)	30 1/2 in (0.77 m)	9 1/4 in (0.23 m)	6 ft 1 3/8 in (1.86 m)	4.53 s	1.60 s	2.64 s	4.28 s	6.85 s	40.5 in (1.03 m)	10 ft 8 in (3.25 m)	5 reps
All values from Pro Day

After not being selected in the 2026 NFL draft, Miller signed with the Carolina Panthers as an undrafted free agent. He was waived on August 30 as part of final roster cuts.
