= Khalil Dinkins =

American football player (born 2002)

No. 82 – San Francisco 49ers
- Position: Tight end
- Roster status: Practice squad

Personal information
- Born: May 29, 2002 (age 24); Wexford, Pennsylvania, U.S.
- Listed height: 6 ft 4 in (1.93 m)
- Listed weight: 251 lb (114 kg)

Career information
- High school: North Allegheny (Wexford, Pennsylvania)
- College: Penn State (2021–2025)
- NFL draft: 2026: undrafted

Career history
- San Francisco 49ers (2026–present)*
- * Offseason or practice squad member only
- Stats at Pro Football Reference

Khalil Joseph Dinkins (born May 29, 2002) is an American professional football tight end for the San Francisco 49ers of the National Football League (NFL). He played college football for the Penn State Nittany Lions.

== Early life ==
Dinkins attended North Allegheny High School in Wexford, Pennsylvania. He was rated as a three-star recruit by 247Sports, and committed to play college football for the Penn State Nittany Lions over offers from other schools such as Boston College, Kentucky, and Pittsburgh.

== College career ==
During his four-year college career from 2022 to 2025, Dinkins played in 47 games, hauling in 37 passes for 399 yards and seven touchdowns. After the 2025 season, he declared for the 2026 NFL draft.

== Professional career ==
Pre-draft measurables
Height	Weight	Arm length	Hand span	Wingspan	40-yard dash	10-yard split	20-yard split	20-yard shuttle	Three-cone drill	Vertical jump	Broad jump	Bench press
6 ft 4 1/4 in (1.94 m)	251 lb (114 kg)	33 1/4 in (0.84 m)	9 1/2 in (0.24 m)	6 ft 7 7/8 in (2.03 m)	4.72 s	1.70 s	2.76 s	4.33 s	7.28 s	32.5 in (0.83 m)	9 ft 11 in (3.02 m)	25 reps
All values from NFL Combine

After not being selected in the 2026 NFL draft, Dinkins signed with the San Francisco 49ers as an undrafted free agent. On July 25, 2026, Dinkins was waived by the 49ers with a non-football injury designation. He was re-signed on August 22. On August 30, Dinkins was waived by San Francisco as a part of final roster cuts, then was re-signed to the practice squad the next day.

== Personal life ==
Dinkins is the son of former NFL tight end Darnell Dinkins.
