= Zion Tracy =

American football player (born 2004)

No. 9 – Penn State Nittany Lions
- Position: Cornerback
- Class: Senior

Personal information
- Born: March 12, 2004 (age 22)
- Listed height: 5 ft 11 in (1.80 m)
- Listed weight: 186 lb (84 kg)

Career information
- High school: St. Thomas More (Montville, Connecticut)
- College: Penn State (2023–present)
- Stats at ESPN

Zion K. Tracy (born March 12, 2004) is an American football cornerback for the Penn State Nittany Lions.

== Early life ==
Tracy attended St. Thomas More School in Montville, Connecticut. During his senior season, he totaled 500 receiving yards and 12 touchdowns on offense, while making three interceptions on defense. Tracy committed to play college football for the Penn State Nittany Lions over offers from Rutgers and Syracuse.

== College career ==
As a freshman in 2023, Tracy appeared in all 13 games, putting up 13 tackles. In week 10 of the 2024 season, he intercepted a pass which he returned 30-yards for a touchdown against Ohio State. In the 2025 Orange Bowl, Tracy recorded an interception is a loss versus Notre Dame. He finished the 2024 season, playing in all 16 games with four starts, notching 35 tackles, two interceptions, and two pass deflections. During the 2025 season, Tracy recorded 32 tackles with five being for a loss, a sack, two pass deflections, and a forced fumble in 11 games played.
