= Daequan Hardy =

American football player (born 2001)

Pittsburgh Steelers
- Position: Cornerback
- Roster status: Injured reserve

Personal information
- Born: June 13, 2001 (age 25); Pittsburgh, Pennsylvania, U.S.
- Listed height: 5 ft 9 in (1.75 m)
- Listed weight: 178 lb (81 kg)

Career information
- High school: Penn Hills (Penn Hills, Pennsylvania)
- College: Penn State (2020–2023)
- NFL draft: 2024: 6th round, 219th overall pick

Career history
- Buffalo Bills (2024–2025)*; Pittsburgh Steelers (2025–present)*
- * Offseason or practice squad member only

Awards and highlights
- Second-team All-Big Ten (2023)
- Stats at Pro Football Reference

Daequan Keith Hardy (born June 13, 2001) is an American professional football cornerback for the Pittsburgh Steelers of the National Football League (NFL). He played college football at Penn State.

== Early life ==
Hardy attended high school at Penn Hills. In Hardy's senior season, he amassed a total of 22 touchdowns. Hardy helped lead his team to a Pennsylvania state title, as in the game he scored four touchdowns, two receiving, an 84-yard kickoff return, and a 100-yard pick six, as he also intercepted three passes in the game. Coming out of high school, Hardy was rated as a three-star recruit, where he decided to commit to play college football for the Penn State Nittany Lions.

== College career ==
In Hardy's first career season in 2020, he tallied ten tackles, three pass deflections, and a sack. In 2021, Hardy had 15 tackles, with three going for a loss, a sack, six pass deflections, two interceptions, and a touchdown. During the 2022 season, Hardy notched 13 tackles with half a tackle being for a loss, half a sack, four pass deflections, an interception, and a forced fumble. In week seven of the 2023 season, Hardy returned two punts for touchdowns in a win over UMass. His two touchdowns, was a single game school record for punt return touchdowns. Hardy finished the 2023 season totaling 22 tackles with three going for a loss, a sack, seven pass deflections, and two interceptions, while also returning 17 punts for 248 yards and two touchdowns. For his performance on the 2023 season, Hardy was named third team all Big-Ten. After the conclusion of the 2023 season, Hardy declared for the 2024 NFL draft.

== Professional career ==
Pre-draft measurables
Height	Weight	Arm length	Hand span	Wingspan	40-yard dash	10-yard split	20-yard split	20-yard shuttle	Three-cone drill	Vertical jump	Broad jump	Bench press
5 ft 9 3/8 in (1.76 m)	179 lb (81 kg)	30 in (0.76 m)	8 1/8 in (0.21 m)	5 ft 10 7/8 in (1.80 m)	4.38 s	1.50 s	2.56 s	4.17 s	7.17 s	42.5 in (1.08 m)	10 ft 6 in (3.20 m)	15 reps
All values from NFL Combine/Pro Day

=== Buffalo Bills ===
Hardy was selected by the Buffalo Bills with the 219th overall pick in the sixth round of the 2024 NFL draft. He was released as part of final roster cuts on August 27, then later added back to the practice squad. He signed a reserve/future contract with Buffalo on January 27, 2025.

On August 26, 2025, Hardy was released by the Bills as part of final roster cuts and re-signed to the practice squad the next day. He was released by Buffalo again on August 28.

=== Pittsburgh Steelers ===
On November 4, 2025, Hardy signed with the Pittsburgh Steelers' practice squad. He was released on November 26 and re-signed to the practice squad on December 2. On January 14, 2026, Hardy signed a reserve/futures contract with Pittsburgh. He was waived/injured on May 4, and placed on injured reserve.
