= Michal Menet =

American football player (born 1997)

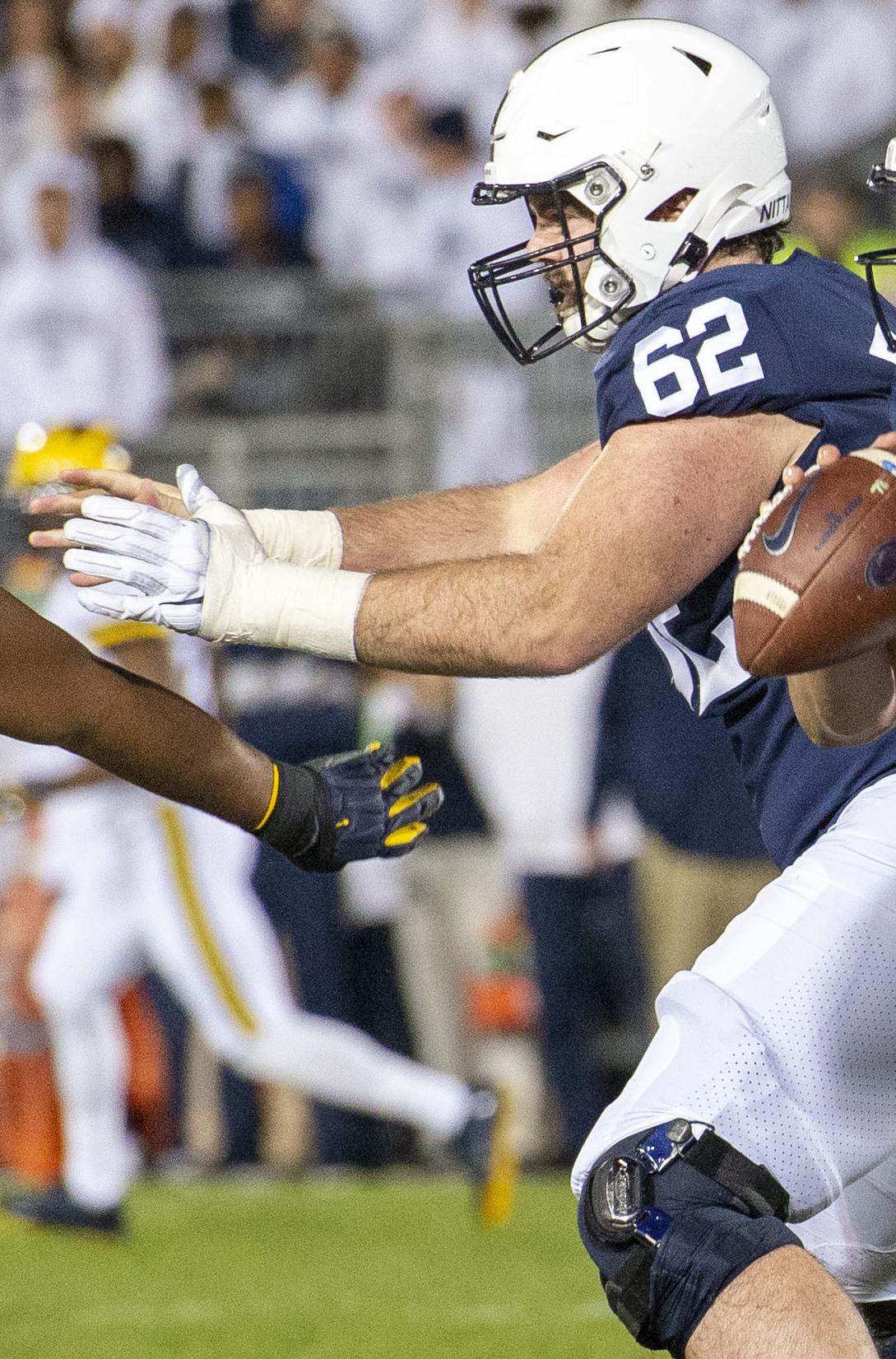
- Menet with the Penn State Nittany Lions in 2019

No. 62, 72
- Position: Center

Personal information
- Born: August 8, 1997 (age 29); Reading, Pennsylvania, U.S.
- Listed height: 6 ft 4 in (1.93 m)
- Listed weight: 301 lb (137 kg)

Career information
- High school: Exeter (Reading, Pennsylvania)
- College: Penn State (2016–2020)
- NFL draft: 2021: 7th round, 247th overall pick

Career history
- Arizona Cardinals (2021)*; Green Bay Packers (2021–2022)*; Seattle Sea Dragons (2023); Atlanta Falcons (2023)*
- * Offseason or practice squad member only
- Stats at Pro Football Reference

Michal James Menet (born August 8, 1997) is an American former professional football center. He played college football at Penn State and was selected by the Arizona Cardinals in the seventh round of the 2021 NFL draft.

== Early life ==
Menet was born on August 8, 1997, at the Reading Hospital to Sherry Graffius, a dental hygienist, and Brian Menet, an integrated warehouse logistics manager. Menet predominantly grew up in Birdsboro, Pennsylvania, with his father and step-mother, Pamela Shupp Menet, Berks County Economic Director who played a large role in the development process of M. Night Shyamalan’s Avatar at the Reading Pagoda.

Menet played high school football at Exeter Township Senior High School in Reading, Pennsylvania. In 2015, Menet blocked a punt in a game against Governor Mifflin Senior High School which led the Exeter Eagles to their first league championship in over a decade.

Predominantly an offensive and defensive lineman throughout high school, Menet also played tight end his senior year due to a quarterback’s injury.

Menet was coached by Matt Bauer and Kerry Ciatto in high school. In his junior and senior years, Menet was coached by his older brother, Christian, who played college football for the Eastern Michigan Eagles.

College recruiting
Name	Hometown	School	Height	Weight	Commit date
Michal Menet; OT	Reading, Pennsylvania	Exeter Township Senior High School	6 ft 5 in (1.96 m)	283 lb (128 kg)	May 29, 2015
Michal Menet; OT	Recruit ratings: Scout: Rivals: 247Sports:				
Overall recruit ranking: Scout: 1 (OG) Rivals: 5 (OG), 3 (Pennsylvania)
Note: In many cases, Scout, Rivals, 247Sports, On3, and ESPN may conflict in their listings of height and weight.; In these cases, the average was taken. ESPN grades are on a 100-point scale.; Sources: "2016 Team Ranking". Rivals.com.

== College career ==
Menet was ranked as a four–star recruit by 247Sports.com coming out of high school. He committed to Penn State on May 29, 2015.

== Professional career ==
Pre-draft measurables
Height	Weight	Arm length	Hand span	Bench press
6 ft 4 1/8 in (1.93 m)	301 lb (137 kg)	31 1/2 in (0.80 m)	10 in (0.25 m)	26 reps
All values from Pro Day

=== Arizona Cardinals ===
Menet was drafted by the Arizona Cardinals in the seventh round (247th overall) of the 2021 NFL draft on May 1, 2021. Menet officially signed with the Cardinals on May 20, 2021, with the contract details initially being undisclosed. He was waived on August 30, 2021, and re-signed to the practice squad. He was released on September 7. He re-signed with their practice squad on September 29. Menet was released on October 5.

=== Green Bay Packers ===
On December 15, 2021, Menet was signed to the Green Bay Packers practice squad.

On January 25, 2022, he signed a reserve/future contract with the Packers. He was waived on August 30. On December 13, 2022, Menet was signed to the practice squad.

=== Seattle Sea Dragons ===
Menet moved on to the Seattle Sea Dragons of the XFL after being waived by the Packers, winning him an invitation to the Atlanta Falcons minicamp in May 2023. He was released from his contract on August 3, 2023.

=== Atlanta Falcons ===
On August 3, 2023, Menet was signed by the Falcons. He was waived on August 29, 2023.

== Personal life ==
Menet has a younger brother, Joey Schlaffer, who committed to play football at Penn State in October 2021. Schlaffer helped lead Exeter to its first ever PIAA District III Championship in November 2021.
