= Theo Johnson =

Canadian gridiron football player (born 2001)

No. 84 – New York Giants
- Position: Tight end
- Roster status: Active

Personal information
- Born: February 26, 2001 (age 25); Winnipeg, Manitoba, Canada
- Listed height: 6 ft 6 in (1.98 m)
- Listed weight: 264 lb (120 kg)

Career information
- High school: Holy Names (Windsor, Ontario)
- College: Penn State (2020–2023)
- NFL draft: 2024: 4th round, 108th overall pick
- CFL draft: 2024: 8th round, 71st overall pick

Career history
- New York Giants (2024–present)

Career NFL statistics as of 2025
- Receptions: 74
- Receiving yards: 859
- Receiving touchdowns: 6
- Stats at Pro Football Reference

Theodore Joseph Johnson (born February 26, 2001) is a Canadian professional football tight end for the New York Giants of the National Football League (NFL). He played college football for the Penn State Nittany Lions.

== Early life ==
Johnson was born on February 26, 2001, in Winnipeg, Manitoba, and grew up in Windsor, Ontario. He attended Holy Names High School, where he played Canadian football. Johnson was selected to play in the 2020 Under Armour All-America Game, but did not play in that game after suffering an injury in pre-game practice. Johnson was a four-star recruit and committed to play college football at Penn State over offers from Alabama, Georgia, Iowa, Michigan, Ohio State.

== College career ==
Johnson caught four passes for 56 yards during his freshman season with the Penn State Nittany Lions. He had 19 receptions for 213 yards and one touchdown as a sophomore. As a junior, Johnson served as Penn State's second tight end behind Brenton Strange and caught 20 passes for 328 yards and four touchdowns.

== Professional career ==
Pre-draft measurables
Height	Weight	Arm length	Hand span	Wingspan	40-yard dash	10-yard split	20-yard split	20-yard shuttle	Three-cone drill	Vertical jump	Broad jump	Bench press
6 ft 6 1/8 in (1.98 m)	259 lb (117 kg)	33 in (0.84 m)	10 1/4 in (0.26 m)	6 ft 8 3/4 in (2.05 m)	4.57 s	1.55 s	2.68 s	4.19 s	7.15 s	39.5 in (1.00 m)	10 ft 5 in (3.18 m)	19 reps
All values from NFL Combine/Pro Day

Johnson was selected by the New York Giants in the fourth round, 107th overall, of the 2024 NFL draft. Johnson was also the second highest rated prospect ahead of the 2024 CFL draft; he was selected 71st overall in the eighth and final round by the BC Lions.

== NFL career statistics ==
Legend
**Bold**	Career high

=== Regular season ===
Year	Team	Games		Receiving					Fumbles	
Year	Team	GP	GS	Rec	Yds	Y/R	Lng	TD	Fum	Lost
2024	NYG	12	11	29	331	11.4	35	1	0	0
2025	NYG	**15**	**15**	**45**	**528**	**11.7**	**42**	**5**	0	0
Career		27	26	74	859	11.6	42	6	0	0

== Personal life ==
Johnson's older brother, Dominic, played football at Buffalo.
