= Olu Fashanu =

American football player (born 2002)

No. 74 – New York Jets
- Position: Offensive tackle
- Roster status: Active

Personal information
- Born: December 9, 2002 (age 23); Waldorf, Maryland, U.S.
- Listed height: 6 ft 6 in (1.98 m)
- Listed weight: 312 lb (142 kg)

Career information
- High school: Gonzaga College (Washington, D.C.)
- College: Penn State (2020–2023)
- NFL draft: 2024: 1st round, 11th overall pick

Career history
- New York Jets (2024–present)

Awards and highlights
- Consensus All-American (2023); Big Ten Offensive Lineman of the Year (2023); First-team All-Big Ten (2023); Second-team All-Big Ten (2022)

Career NFL statistics as of Week 7, 2026
- Games played: 39
- Games started: 31
- Stats at Pro Football Reference

Olumuyiwa Anthony Fashanu (born December 9, 2002) is an American professional football offensive tackle for the New York Jets of the National Football League (NFL). He played college football for the Penn State Nittany Lions, earning consensus All-American honors in 2023. Fashanu was selected by the Jets in the first round in the 2024 NFL draft.

== Early life and college ==
Fashanu was born on December 9, 2002, in Waldorf, Maryland. He is of Yoruba heritage. He attended Gonzaga College High School in Washington, D.C. He committed to Penn State University to play college football. After not playing his first year at Penn State in 2020, Fashanu played nine games in 2021 and made his first career start in the 2022 Outback Bowl. He became the starter at left tackle in 2022. Fashanu was voted to the 2023 College Football All-America Team and was named the Big Ten's Rimington–Pace Offensive Lineman of the Year before declaring for the 2024 NFL draft.

== Professional career ==
Pre-draft measurables
Height	Weight	Arm length	Hand span	Wingspan	40-yard dash	10-yard split	20-yard split	Vertical jump	Broad jump
6 ft 6 in (1.98 m)	312 lb (142 kg)	34 in (0.86 m)	8 1/2 in (0.22 m)	6 ft 10 5/8 in (2.10 m)	5.11 s	1.77 s	2.94 s	32.0 in (0.81 m)	9 ft 1 in (2.77 m)
All values from NFL Combine

Fashanu was selected by the New York Jets with the 11th overall pick in the 2024 NFL draft. After filling in for Morgan Moses at right tackle for two games, he was named the starting left tackle in week 11 following an injury to Tyron Smith and started the next five games. Fashanu suffered plantar fasciitis in week 16 and missed the rest of the season.
