= Coziah Izzard =

American football player (born 2001)

Profile
- Position: Defensive tackle

Personal information
- Born: June 11, 2001 (age 25); Columbia, Maryland, U.S.
- Listed height: 6 ft 3 in (1.91 m)
- Listed weight: 305 lb (138 kg)

Career information
- High school: DeMatha Catholic (Hyattsville, Maryland)
- College: Penn State (2020–2024)
- NFL draft: 2025: undrafted

Career history
- Kansas City Chiefs (2025)*; New Orleans Saints (2025)*; Arizona Cardinals (2026)*; Cleveland Browns (2026)*
- * Offseason or practice squad member only
- Stats at Pro Football Reference

Coziah Athens Izzard (born June 11, 2001) is an American professional football defensive tackle. He played college football for the Penn State Nittany Lions.

== Early life ==
Izzard played high school football at DeMatha Catholic where he played defensive end and fullback with the Stags football team. He helped the Stags build a 12–0 record during his freshman year. In that same year, Izzard helped the Stags win the Washington Catholic Athletic Conference (WCAC) Championship. He made All-WCAC selection four times, twice-served as team captain and was named the team's Most Valuable Player. Izzard was also a four-year letterman. He was rated a four-star recruiting prospect by the 247Sports Composite and received a total of 23 athletic scholarship offers.

== College career ==
Izzard enrolled at Pennsylvania State University (Penn State). He began his true freshman season in 2020 and played in three games as a defensive tackle with the Nittany Lions. He played 51 total games from 2020 to 2024 recording career totals of seven starts, 78 tackles including 40 solo tackles, 17.5 tackles for loss, nine sacks and two forced fumbles.

== Professional career ==
Pre-draft measurables
Height	Weight	Arm length	Hand span	Wingspan	40-yard dash	10-yard split	20-yard split	20-yard shuttle	Vertical jump	Broad jump	Bench press
6 ft 2 5/8 in (1.90 m)	298 lb (135 kg)	34 in (0.86 m)	9 5/8 in (0.24 m)	6 ft 10 1/2 in (2.10 m)	4.85 s	1.56 s	2.77 s	4.52 s	33.5 in (0.85 m)	9 ft 5 in (2.87 m)	25 reps
All values from Pro Day

=== Kansas City Chiefs ===
On May 13, 2025, Izzard signed with the Kansas City Chiefs as an undrafted free agent in the wake of the 2025 NFL draft. He was relegated to the practice squad following early roster cuts made on August 27, then released the next day.

=== New Orleans Saints ===
On September 1, 2025, Izzard was signed to the New Orleans Saints' practice squad. He signed a reserve/future contract with New Orleans on January 5, 2026. On June 17, Izzard was waived by the Saints.

=== Arizona Cardinals ===
On July 22, 2026, Izzard signed with the Arizona Cardinals. He was waived by the Cardinals on August 3.

=== Cleveland Browns ===
On August 4, 2026, Izzard was claimed off waivers by the Cleveland Browns. He was waived by the Browns on August 28.
