= KeAndre Lambert-Smith =

American football player (born 2001)

No. 84 – Los Angeles Chargers
- Positions: Wide receiver, kickoff returner
- Roster status: Active

Personal information
- Born: October 16, 2001 (age 25)
- Listed height: 6 ft 1 in (1.85 m)
- Listed weight: 182 lb (83 kg)

Career information
- High school: Maury (Norfolk, Virginia)
- College: Penn State (2020–2023) Auburn (2024)
- NFL draft: 2025: 5th round, 158th overall pick

Career history
- Los Angeles Chargers (2025–present)

Career NFL statistics as of 2025
- Receptions: 5
- Receiving yards: 51
- Receiving touchdowns: 1
- Return yards: 418
- Stats at Pro Football Reference

KeAndre Lambert-Smith (born October 16, 2001) is an American professional football wide receiver and kickoff returner for the Los Angeles Chargers of the National Football League (NFL). He played college football for the Penn State Nittany Lions and Auburn Tigers and was selected by the Chargers in the fifth round of the 2025 NFL draft.

== Early life ==
Lambert-Smith grew up in Norfolk, Virginia and attended Matthew Fontaine Maury High School. As a senior, he gained over 1,500 yards from scrimmage and scored 26 touchdowns as Maury won the Group 5A state championship. Lambert-Smith was rated a four-star recruit and committed to play college football at Penn State over offers from North Carolina, Ohio State, Clemson, and Georgia.

== College career ==
=== Penn State ===
Lambert-Smith (who wore numbers 5, 13, 1, 3 throughout collegiate career) caught 15 passes for 138 yards during his true freshman season, which did not count against his eligibility because of coronavirus pandemic. He had 34 receptions for 521 yards and five touchdowns during his redshirt freshman season. Lambert-Smith caught three passes for 124 yards and one touchdown in the 2023 Rose Bowl as a redshirt sophomore, including a Rose Bowl record 88-yard reception. He finished the season with 24 receptions for 389 yards and four touchdowns and also completed two pass attempts for 73 yards and one touchdown. On April 15, 2024, Lambert-Smith announced that he would enter the transfer portal.

=== Auburn ===
On April 24, 2024, Lambert-Smith announced that he would transfer to Auburn for his senior year. He finished the 2024 season with 50 catches for 981 yards and 8 TD. Named second team all-SEC.

== Professional career ==
Pre-draft measurables
Height	Weight	Arm length	Hand span	Wingspan	40-yard dash	10-yard split	20-yard split	20-yard shuttle	Vertical jump	Broad jump	Bench press
6 ft 0 3/4 in (1.85 m)	190 lb (86 kg)	32 5/8 in (0.83 m)	9 1/8 in (0.23 m)	6 ft 6 5/8 in (2.00 m)	4.37 s	1.53 s	2.56 s	3.98 s	34.5 in (0.88 m)	10 ft 7 in (3.23 m)	11 reps
All values from NFL Combine/Pro Day

Lambert-Smith was selected by the Los Angeles Chargers with the 158th pick in the fifth round of the 2025 NFL draft. In a Week 15 victory over the Kansas City Chiefs, Lambert-Smith recorded his first career touchdown on a 16–yard reception from Justin Herbert. He made 10 appearances (two starts) for Los Angeles during his rookie campaign, recording five receptions for 51 yards and one touchdown. Lambert-Smith was placed on season-ending injured reserve on January 10, 2026, due to a hamstring injury suffered in Week 18 against the Denver Broncos.

On September 15, 2026, Lambert-Smith was placed on injured reserve due to a hamstring injury suffered in the team's season opener against the Arizona Cardinals.

== Personal life ==
Lambert-Smith's uncle, Kam Chancellor, played college football at Virginia Tech and in the NFL with the Seattle Seahawks for eight seasons.
