= Curtis Jacobs =

American football player (born 2002)

Profile
- Position: Linebacker

Personal information
- Born: February 18, 2002 (age 24); Glen Burnie, Maryland, U.S.
- Listed height: 6 ft 1 in (1.85 m)
- Listed weight: 241 lb (109 kg)

Career information
- High school: McDonogh (Owings Mills, Maryland)
- College: Penn State (2020–2023)
- NFL draft: 2024: undrafted

Career history
- Kansas City Chiefs (2024)*; New England Patriots (2024); Tennessee Titans (2025)*; New York Giants (2025)*; Tennessee Titans (2025)*; DC Defenders (2026); Washington Commanders (2026)*
- * Offseason or practice squad member only

Career NFL statistics as of 2024
- Tackles: 4
- Stats at Pro Football Reference

Curtis Jerome Jacobs Jr. (born February 18, 2002) is an American professional football linebacker. He played college football for the Penn State Nittany Lions.

== Early life ==
Jacobs attended McDonogh School in Owings Mills, Maryland. He played wide receiver and defensive back in high school. He was selected to play in the 2020 Under Armour All-America Game. He committed to Penn State University to play college football.

== College career ==
As a true freshman at Penn State in 2020, Jacobs played in eight games and had nine tackles as a linebacker. He became a starter his second year in 2021. He finished the year with 61 tackles, three sacks and an interception over 12 games. In 2022, he started 12 games, recording 52 tackles, four sacks and an interception returned for a touchdown. Jacobs returned to Penn State in 2023, rather than enter the 2022 NFL draft.

== Professional career ==
Pre-draft measurables
Height	Weight	Arm length	Hand span	Wingspan	40-yard dash	10-yard split	20-yard split	20-yard shuttle	Three-cone drill	Vertical jump	Broad jump	Bench press
6 ft 1 3/8 in (1.86 m)	241 lb (109 kg)	31 1/2 in (0.80 m)	10 1/4 in (0.26 m)	6 ft 5 3/4 in (1.97 m)	4.58 s	1.59 s	2.65 s	4.40 s	7.15 s	35.0 in (0.89 m)	10 ft 9 in (3.28 m)	18 reps
All values from NFL Combine/Pro Day

=== Kansas City Chiefs ===
Jacobs was signed by the Kansas City Chiefs as an undrafted free agent after the 2024 NFL draft. He was also selected by the DC Defenders in the eighth round of the 2024 UFL draft on July 17. On August 27, 2024, Jacobs was waived by the Chiefs.

=== New England Patriots ===
On August 28, 2024, Jacobs was claimed off waivers by the New England Patriots. He appeared in 9 games and recorded 4 combined tackles. On March 21, 2025, Jacobs was released by the Patriots.

=== Tennessee Titans ===
On March 24, 2025, Jacobs was claimed off waivers by the Tennessee Titans. He was waived on August 27.

=== New York Giants ===
On September 16, 2025, Jacobs signed with the New York Giants practice squad. He was released on September 23.

=== Tennessee Titans (second stint) ===
On September 26, 2025, Jacobs signed with the Tennessee Titans' practice squad. He was waived on October 21.

=== DC Defenders ===
On January 14, 2026, Jacobs was selected by the DC Defenders of the United Football League (UFL).

=== Washington Commanders ===
On August 11, 2026, Jacobs signed with the Washington Commanders. On August 30, he was waived/injured and placed on injured reserve the next day after clearing waivers. Jacobs was released by the Commanders on September 9.
