= Adisa Isaac =

American football player (born 2001)

No. 50 – Baltimore Ravens
- Position: Outside linebacker
- Roster status: Practice squad

Personal information
- Born: October 4, 2001 (age 25); Brooklyn, New York, U.S.
- Listed height: 6 ft 4 in (1.93 m)
- Listed weight: 253 lb (115 kg)

Career information
- High school: Canarsie (Canarsie, Brooklyn)
- College: Penn State (2019–2023)
- NFL draft: 2024: 3rd round, 93rd overall pick

Career history
- Baltimore Ravens (2024–present)

Awards and highlights
- First-team All-Big Ten (2023); Third-team All-Big Ten (2022)

Career NFL statistics as of Week 9, 2026
- Tackles: 6
- Pass deflections: 1
- Stats at Pro Football Reference

Adisa Akil Isaac (born October 4, 2001) is an American professional football outside linebacker for the Baltimore Ravens of the National Football League (NFL). He played college football for the Penn State Nittany Lions.

== Early life ==
Isaac was born on October 4, 2001, in Brooklyn, New York. He attended Canarsie High School in Canarsie, Brooklyn, where he played defensive end and recorded 210 tackles and 39 sacks. He committed to Penn State University to play college football.

== College career ==
As a true freshman at Penn State in 2019 he played in 11 games and had 14 tackles and 1.5 sacks. As a sophomore in 2020, he had 1.5 sacks and 13 tackles. After missing 2021 due to injury, Isaac started all 13 games in 2022, recording 28 tackles and four sacks. He returned to Penn State in 2023, rather than enter the 2023 NFL draft.

== Professional career ==
Pre-draft measurables
Height	Weight	Arm length	Hand span	Wingspan	40-yard dash	10-yard split	20-yard split	20-yard shuttle	Three-cone drill	Vertical jump	Broad jump	Bench press
6 ft 4 3/8 in (1.94 m)	247 lb (112 kg)	33 7/8 in (0.86 m)	9 5/8 in (0.24 m)	6 ft 9 in (2.06 m)	4.74 s	1.64 s	2.73 s	4.27 s	7.01 s	34.5 in (0.88 m)	10 ft 3 in (3.12 m)	20 reps
All values from NFL Combine/Pro Day

Isaac was selected by the Baltimore Ravens in the 3rd round (93rd overall) of the 2024 NFL draft. On July 15, 2024, he was placed on the Non-football injury and illness (NFI) list. Isaac made four appearances for Baltimore during his rookie campaign, recording one pass deflection and four combined tackles.

On August 18, 2025, head coach John Harbaugh announced that Isaac would begin the year on injured reserve after undergoing elbow surgery to repair an elbow dislocation.

On August 30, 2026, Isaac was waived by the Ravens as a part of final roster cuts; he was re-signed to the team's practice squad the next day.
