= Ty Howle =

American football player and coach (born 1991)

Current position
- Title: Offensive coordinator
- Team: Virginia Tech
- Conference: ACC

Biographical details
- Born: August 20, 1991 (age 35); Raleigh, North Carolina, U.S.

Playing career
- 2009–2013: Penn State
- Position: Offensive lineman

Coaching career (HC unless noted)
- 2014–2015: NC State (GA)
- 2016–2017: Western Illinois (OL)
- 2018–2019: Western Illinois (AHC/co-OC/OL)
- 2020: Penn State (analyst)
- 2021–2022: Penn State (TE)
- 2023–2025: Penn State (co-OC/TE)
- 2026–present: Virginia Tech (OC/TE)

Ty Howle (born August 20, 1991) is an American football coach who is the offensive coordinator at Virginia Tech. Previously, he was the tight ends coach and co-offensive coordinator at Penn State University, a role where he was named Football Scoop's 2024 National Tight Ends Coach of the Year.

Howle played college football at Penn State University as an offensive lineman from 2009 to 2013. He previously served as an assistant coach at Western Illinois University and North Carolina State University.

== Early life and playing career ==
Born in Raleigh, North Carolina, Howle played at Bunn High School under his father, David Howle.

He played collegiate football at Penn State University from 2009 to 2013 as an offensive lineman, appearing in 47 career games and making 13 starts at center and left guard. Howle served as a team captain during the 2013 season.

During his career, Howle earned four Academic All-Big Ten selections. He concluded his playing career by receiving the Maginnis Memorial Award, presented annually to Penn State’s most outstanding senior offensive lineman. He earned a Bachelor of Science in kinesiology from Penn State in 2013 and later completed a Master of Arts in liberal studies at North Carolina State University in 2015.

== Coaching career ==
=== NC State ===
In 2014, Howle began his coaching career at North Carolina State University as a graduate assistant where he worked with future NFL players such as Joe Thuney

=== Western Illinois ===
In 2016, Howle was hired as the offensive line coach at Western Illinois University under head coach Charlie Fisher.

In 2017, Western Illinois led the Missouri Valley Conference in fewest sacks allowed per passing attempt and earned an FCS playoff berth.

In 2018, Howle was retained and promoted to assistant head coach, co-offensive coordinator and offensive line coach under head coach Jared Elliott. The team ranked 21st nationally in passing.

=== Penn State ===
In 2020, Howle joined Penn State University as an analyst.

In 2021, Howle was hired as the tight ends coach at Penn State University under head coach James Franklin.

In 2023, Howle was promoted to co-offensive coordinator and tight ends coach.

=== Virginia Tech ===
In 2025, Howle was hired as the offensive coordinator at Virginia Tech under head coach James Franklin.

== Personal life ==
Howle and his wife, Karen, have two sons.
