= Juice Scruggs =

American football player (born 2000)

No. 70 – Detroit Lions
- Position: Center
- Roster status: Active

Personal information
- Born: January 19, 2000 (age 26); Ashtabula, Ohio, U.S.
- Listed height: 6 ft 3 in (1.91 m)
- Listed weight: 320 lb (145 kg)

Career information
- High school: Cathedral Prep (Erie, Pennsylvania)
- College: Penn State (2018–2022)
- NFL draft: 2023: 2nd round, 62nd overall pick

Career history
- Houston Texans (2023–2025); Detroit Lions (2026–present)

Awards and highlights
- Third-team All-Big Ten (2022)

Career NFL statistics as of Week 10, 2026
- Games played: 46
- Games started: 27
- Stats at Pro Football Reference

Frederick Henry "Juice" Scruggs (born January 19, 2000) is an American professional football center for the Detroit Lions of the National Football League (NFL). He played college football for the Penn State Nittany Lions and was selected by the Houston Texans in the second round of the 2023 NFL draft.

== Early life ==
Scruggs was born on January 19, 2000, in Ashtabula, Ohio. He attended Cathedral Preparatory School in Erie, Pennsylvania, and was a four-time varsity letter winner in football, playing lineman on both sides of the ball. He helped them compile a 49–3 record in his four years with the team, including consecutive 14–0 seasons. He was named first-team all-state as a defensive lineman in 2016 and as a senior in 2017 was named first-team all-state on the offensive line and was given the Pennsylvania Football New Class 4-A Lineman of the Year award. A consensus four-star recruit, Scruggs was ranked as the fifth-best center nationally. He committed to Penn State over offers from various other schools, including LSU, Ohio State and Michigan.

== College career ==
Scruggs saw limited action in his first year at Penn State, only appearing on three snaps during their game against Maryland. He was named the joint-winner of the team's Scout Team Offensive Player of the Year award.

In early 2019, he was involved in a car accident that caused him serious injuries, including a concussion and fractured vertebrae. Scruggs had to wear a back brace for eight months and missed the entire season due to his injuries. He eventually recovered and made his return to the field against Maryland in November 2020, close to two years after the crash. Scruggs appeared in a total of seven games on the year, none of which he started.

Scruggs posted his first start in the 2021 season, starting all 13 games and earning honorable mention all-conference from the Big Ten's coaches and media, third-team honors from Pro Football Focus (PFF), and being named the winner of Penn State's Dick Maginnis Memorial Award for best offensive lineman. The following year, he was voted team captain and started all 12 games, being named third-team All-Big Ten by the league's coaches. Scruggs declared for the NFL draft after the season, forgoing an extra year of eligibility given to him due to the COVID-19 pandemic.

== Professional career ==
Pre-draft measurables
Height	Weight	Arm length	Hand span	Wingspan	40-yard dash	10-yard split	20-yard split	20-yard shuttle	Three-cone drill	Vertical jump	Broad jump	Bench press
6 ft 3 1/4 in (1.91 m)	301 lb (137 kg)	33 1/4 in (0.84 m)	10 1/4 in (0.26 m)	6 ft 9 3/4 in (2.08 m)	5.22 s	1.79 s	2.96 s	4.63 s	7.75 s	32.0 in (0.81 m)	8 ft 6 in (2.59 m)	29 reps
All values from NFL Combine/Pro Day

=== Houston Texans ===
Scruggs was selected by the Houston Texans in the second round (62nd overall) of the 2023 NFL draft. He was placed on injured reserve on August 31, 2023. He was activated on November 25. As a rookie, he appeared in seven games and started six in the 2023 season.

=== Detroit Lions ===
On March 11, 2026, Scruggs was traded to the Detroit Lions in exchange for David Montgomery alongside a 2026 fourth and a 2027 seventh-round pick.
