= 2021 Penn State Nittany Lions football team =

American college football season

2021 Penn State Nittany Lions football

Outback Bowl, L 10–24 vs. Arkansas
- Conference: Big Ten Conference
- East Division
- Record: 7–6 (4–5 Big Ten)
- Head coach: James Franklin (8th season)
- Offensive coordinator: Mike Yurcich (1st season)
- Offensive scheme: Spread
- Defensive coordinator: Brent Pry (8th season)
- Co-defensive coordinator: Anthony Poindexter (1st season)
- Home stadium: Beaver Stadium

Uniform
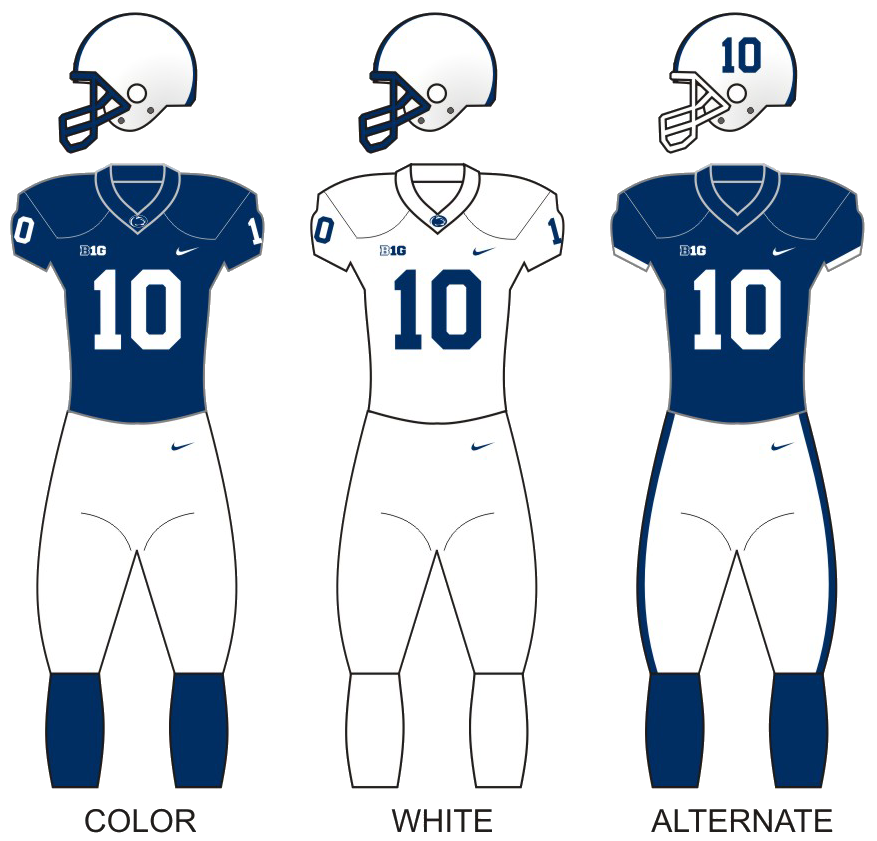

2021 Big Ten Conference football standings
	Conf.			Overall
Team	W		L	W		L
East Division
No. 3 Michigan xy$^	8	–	1	12	–	2
No. 6 Ohio State x	8	–	1	11	–	2
No. 9 Michigan State	7	–	2	11	–	2
Penn State	4	–	5	7	–	6
Maryland	3	–	6	7	–	6
Rutgers	2	–	7	5	–	8
Indiana	0	–	9	2	–	10
West Division
No. 23 Iowa xy	7	–	2	10	–	4
Minnesota	6	–	3	9	–	4
Wisconsin	6	–	3	9	–	4
Purdue	6	–	3	9	–	4
Illinois	4	–	5	5	–	7
Nebraska	1	–	8	3	–	9
Northwestern	1	–	8	3	–	9
Championship: Michigan 42, Iowa 3
^ – College Football Playoff participant; $ – Conference champion; x – Division champion/co-champions; y – Championship game participant; Rankings from AP Poll

The 2021 Penn State Nittany Lions football team represented Pennsylvania State University in the 2021 NCAA Division I FBS football season. The team competed as a member of the Big Ten Conference and played their home games at Beaver Stadium in University Park, Pennsylvania. The team was led by eighth-year head coach James Franklin.

The Nittany Lions had a promising start to the season, going 5–0 and beating a ranked Wisconsin and Auburn, to reach number 4 in the AP poll. However during their game against #3 Iowa, quarterback Sean Clifford was injured, stalling all momentum they had, allowing Iowa to come back and beat them 23–20. The next week they played an unranked Illinois to hopefully regain momentum ahead of playing rival Ohio State on the road, however they lost in a record breaking 9OT. The Nittany Lions would then lose the next four of their last six games, finishing their season at 7–6 after losing to Arkansas in the Outback Bowl.

== Offseason ==
=== Players drafted into the NFL ===
Round	Pick	Player	Position	NFL club
1	12	Micah Parsons	LB	Dallas Cowboys
1	31	Odafe Oweh	DE	Baltimore Ravens
2	55	Pat Freiermuth	TE	Pittsburgh Steelers
7	246	Shaka Toney	DE	Washington Football Team
7	247	Michal Menet	C	Arizona Cardinals
7	248	Will Fries	OG	Indianapolis Colts

== Preseason ==
=== Preseason Big Ten poll ===
Cleveland.com has polled sports journalists representing all member schools as a de facto preseason media poll since 2011, making this the first preseason Big Ten poll since 2010. For the 2021 poll, Penn State was projected to finish second in the East Division.

Media poll (East Division)
Predicted finish	Team	Votes (1st place)
1	Ohio State	238 (34)
2	Penn State	192
3	Indiana	169
4	Michigan	144
5	Maryland	74
6	Rutgers	77.5
7	Michigan State	52.5

== Personnel ==
=== Coaching staff ===
Penn State football current coaching staff
Name	Position	Alma Mater	Years at Penn State
James Franklin	Head coach	East Stroudsburg University (1995)	8th
Brent Pry	Defensive coordinator/linebackers	University at Buffalo (1993)	8th
Mike Yurcich	Offensive coordinator/quarterbacks coach	California University of Pennsylvania (1999)	1st
Anthony Poindexter	Co-defensive coordinator/safeties	University of Virginia (1999)	1st
Ty Howle	Tight ends coach	Penn State University (2013)	2nd
Phil Trautwein	Offensive line	University of Florida (2007)	2nd
John Scott	Defensive line	Western Carolina University (2000)	2nd
Taylor Stubblefield	Wide receivers	Purdue University (2004)	2nd
Ja'Juan Seider	Run Game Coordinator/running backs	West Virginia University (2000)	4th
Terry Smith	Assistant head coach/defensive recruiting coordinator/cornerbacks	Penn State University (1991)	8th
Joe Lorig	Special teams coordinator/outside Linebacker	Western Oregon University (1995)	3rd
Dwight Galt III	Assistant AD, Performance Enhancement	University of Maryland (1981)	8th
V'Angelo Bentley	Graduate Assistant	University of Illinois (2015)	3rd
David Parker	Graduate Assistant	University of Arkansas (2015)	1st
Deion Barnes	Graduate Assistant	Penn State University (2014)	2nd
Wendy Laurent	Graduate Assistant	Penn State University (2016)	2nd

=== Roster ===
2021 Penn State Nittany Lions football roster
Quarterback: 2 Ta'Quan Roberson – (redshirt) freshman (5'11, 195); 9 Christian Veilleux – freshman (6'4, 197); 14 Sean Clifford – (redshirt) junior (6'2, 217); 17 Mason Stahl – freshman (6'0, 204); Running back: 10 John Lovett – senior (6'0, 205); 21 Noah Cain – sophomore (5'10, 226); 24 Keyvone Lee – freshman (6'0, 230); 26 Caziah Holmes – freshman (5'11, 209); 28 Devyn Ford – sophomore (5'11, 205); 38 Tank Smith – (redshirt) freshman (5'7, 227); Wide receiver: 3 Parker Washington – freshman (5'10, 205); 5 Jahan Dotson – junior (5'11, 182); 6 Cam Sullivan-Brown – (redshirt) junior (6'0, 191); 11 Daniel George – (redshirt) sophomore (6'2, 210); 13 KeAndre Lambert-Smith – freshman (6'1, 185); 19 Jaden Dottin – freshman (6'2, 190); 29 Henry Fessler – (redshirt) sophomore (5'10, 182); 80 Malick Meiga – freshman (6'4, 198); 80 Justin Weller – (redshirt) junior (6'0, 194); 83 Johnny Crise – freshman (6'5, 201); 84 Benjamin Wilson – senior (6'2, 212); 88 Norval Black – junior (6'1, 178); 89 Winston Eubanks – (redshirt) senior (6'0, 191); Tight end: 16 Khalil Dinkins – freshman (6'4, 226); 44 Tyler Warren – freshman (6'6, 244); 47 Tommy Friberg – (redshirt) freshman (6'3, 210); 82 Zack Kuntz – (redshirt) sophomore (6'7, 258); 84 Theo Johnson – freshman (6'6, 254); 86 Brenton Strange – (redshirt) freshman (6'3, 252); 89 Grayson Kline – (redshirt) sophomore (6'5, 261); Placekicker: 90 Rafael Checa – (redshirt) sophomore (6'2, 203); 92 Jake Pinegar – junior (6'2, 192); 95 Vlad Hilling – (redshirt) sophomore (5'10, 213); 96 Anthony DaSilva – (redshirt) freshman (5'11, 157)	Offensive lineman: 50 Will Knutsson – (redshirt) sophomore (6'2, 319); 51 Jimmy Christ – freshman (6'7, 298); 52 Blake Zalar – (redshirt) freshman (6'1, 286); 53 Rasheed Walker – (redshirt) sophomore (6'6, 310); 55 Anthony Whigan – (redshirt) junior (6'4, 315); 57 Ibrahim Traore – freshman (6'5, 325); 59 Kaleb Konigus – (redshirt) sophomore (6'2, 291); 63 Collin De Boef – (redshirt) sophomore (6'5, 264); 66 Nick Dawkins – freshman (6'4, 310); 70 Juice Scruggs – (redshirt) sophomore (6'3, 302); 72 Bryce Effner – (redshirt) sophomore (6'5, 301); 73 Mike Miranda – (redshirt) junior (6'3, 301); 74 Olu Fashanu – freshman (6'6, 300); 75 Des Holmes – (redshirt) junior (6'5, 312); 77 Sal Wormley – (redshirt) freshman (6'3, 317); 78 Golden Israel-Achumba – freshman (6'4, 345); 79 Caedan Wallace – (redshirt) freshman (6'5, 313); Nate Bruce – freshman (6'4, 344); Landon Tengwall – freshman (6'6, 321); Defensive lineman: 17 Arnold Ebiketie – DE – (redshirt) senior (6'3, 238); 20 Adisa Isaac – DE – sophomore (6'4, 251); 27 Aeneas Hawkins – DT – (redshirt) sophomore (6'2, 288); 33 Bryce Mostella – DE – freshman (6'6, 248); 44 Joseph Darkwa – DT – (redshirt) freshman (6'5, 293); 46 Nick Tarburton – DE – (redshirt) sophomore (6'3, 252); 51 Hakeem Beamon – DE – (redshirt) freshman (6'3, 292); 52 Jordan van den Berg – DT – sophomore (6'3, 292); 53 Fred Hansard – DT – (redshirt) junior (6'3, 324); 54 Fatorma Mulbah – DT – freshman (6'3, 289); 56 Amin Vanover – DT – freshman (6'4, 279); 91 Dvon Ellies – DT – (redshirt) freshman (6'1, 296); 92 Smith Vilbert – DE – (redshirt) freshman (6'6, 251); 94 Jake Wilson – DE – freshman (6'3, 241); 95 Cole Brevard – DT – freshman (6'3, 312); 97 P. J. Mustipher – DT – junior (6'4, 300); 98 Dan Vasey – DE – (redshirt) junior (6'4, 251); 99 Coziah Izzard – DT – freshman (6'3, 290); Rodney McGraw – DE – freshman (6'5, 254); Derrick Tangelo – DT – senior (6'2, 298); Punter: 93 Levi Forrest – freshman (6'5, 184); 93 Bradley King – (redshirt) junior (6'2, 214); 98 Jordan Stout – (redshirt) junior (6'3, 208); 96 Barney Amor – (redshirt) junior (6'1, 200)	Linebacker: 12 Brandon Smith – sophomore (6'3, 244); 13 Ellis Brooks – (redshirt) junior (6'1, 233); 23 Curtis Jacobs – freshman (6'1, 226); 34 Dominic DeLuca – freshman (6'1, 202); 36 Zuriah Fisher – freshman (6'3, 244); 39 Robbie Dwyer – (redshirt) freshman (6'1, 247); 40 Jesse Luketa – junior (6'3, 242); 41 Kobe King – freshman (6'1, 236); 43 Tyler Elsdon – freshman (6'2, 230); 45 Charlie Katshir – (redshirt) sophomore (6'3, 231); 47 Alex Furmanek – (redshirt) freshman (6'2, 265); 50 Max Chizmar – (redshirt) junior (6'2, 229); Defensive back: 0 Jonathan Sutherland – S – (redshirt) junior (5'11, 202); 1 Jaquan Brisker – S – senior (6'1, 210); 2 Keaton Ellis – CB – sophomore (5'11, 186); 4 Kalen King – CB – freshman (5'11, 177); 5 Tariq Castro-Fields – CB – senior (6'0, 191); 8 Marquis Wilson – CB – sophomore (5'11, 181); 9 Joey Porter Jr. – CB – (redshirt) freshman (6'2, 193); 15 Enzo Jennings – S – freshman (6'1, 197); 16 Ji'Ayir Brown – S – junior (5'11, 209); 17 Joseph Johnson III – CB – freshman (6'2, 168); 21 Tyler Rudolph – S – (redshirt) freshman (6'0, 203); 25 Daequan Hardy – CB – (redshirt) freshman (5'9, 180); 27 Jaden Seider – S – (redshirt) freshman (5'10, 174); 29 Sebastian Costantini – CB – (redshirt) freshman (5'11, 185); 32 Dylan Farronato – S – (redshirt) freshman (5'11, 187); 48 Cody Romano – S – (redshirt) sophomore (6'2, 207); Jeffrey Davis Jr – CB – freshman (6'0, 174); Johnny Dixon – CB – sophomore (6'0, 183); Long snappers: 49 Michael Wright – freshman (6'1, 197); 91 Chris Stoll – (redshirt) junior (6'2, 242)

== Schedule ==
=== Spring game ===
Due to the ongoing COVID-19 pandemic, Penn State did not host their annual Blue vs. White scrimmage. In lieu of the Blue vs. White game, the university invited the freshmen class to Beaver Stadium for what was meant to be the final spring practice on April 17. More than 7,500 Penn State freshmen attended. Following backlash from students and the public, an extra practice was scheduled for April 23, initially limited to Penn State seniors with an in-person class, but soon opened tickets to all seniors, then to the general public.

=== Regular season ===
The Nittany Lions hosted three non-conference games: the Ball State Cardinals from the Mid-American Conference (MAC), the Auburn Tigers (first ever regular season meeting) from the Southeastern Conference (SEC), and the Villanova Wildcats an FCS school from the Colonial Athletic Association (CAA).

PSU played Big Ten opponents Wisconsin, Indiana, Iowa, Illinois, Ohio State, Maryland, Michigan, Rutgers, and Michigan State. The schedule consisted of seven home games and five road games.

Date	Time	Opponent	Rank	Site	TV	Result	Attendance
September 4	12:00 p.m.	at No. 12 Wisconsin	No. 19	Camp Randall Stadium (Big Noon Kickoff)	FOX	W 16–10	76,832
September 11	3:30 p.m.	Ball State*	No. 11	Beaver Stadium; University Park, PA	FS1	W 44–13	105,323
September 18	7:30 p.m.	No. 22 Auburn*	No. 10	Beaver Stadium; University Park, PA (White Out, College GameDay)	ABC	W 28–20	109,958
September 25	12:00 p.m.	No. 11 (FCS) Villanova*	No. 6	Beaver Stadium; University Park, PA	BTN	W 38–17	105,790
October 2	7:30 p.m.	Indiana	No. 4	Beaver Stadium; University Park, PA	ABC	W 24–0	105,951
October 9	4:00 p.m.	at No. 3 Iowa	No. 4	Kinnick Stadium; Iowa City, IA (Big Noon Kickoff)	FOX	L 20–23	69,250
October 23	12:00 p.m.	Illinois^{†}	No. 7	Beaver Stadium; University Park, PA	ABC	L 18–20 ^{9OT}	105,001
October 30	7:30 p.m.	at No. 5 Ohio State	No. 20	Ohio Stadium; Columbus, OH (rivalry)	ABC	L 24–33	102,951
November 6	3:30 p.m.	at Maryland		Maryland Stadium; College Park, MD (rivalry)	FS1	W 31–14	46,924
November 13	12:00 p.m.	No. 6 Michigan		Beaver Stadium; University Park, PA (rivalry)	ABC	L 17–21	109,534
November 20	12:00 p.m.	Rutgers		Beaver Stadium; University Park, PA	BTN	W 28–0	106,038
November 27	3:30 p.m.	at No. 12 Michigan State		Spartan Stadium; East Lansing, MI (rivalry)	ABC	L 27–30	66,312
January 1, 2022	12:00 p.m.	vs. No. 21 Arkansas*		Raymond James Stadium; Tampa, FL (Outback Bowl)	ESPN2	L 10–24	46,577
*Non-conference game; ^{†}Homecoming; Rankings from AP Poll and CFP Rankings (after November 2) released prior to game; All times are in Eastern time

== Game summaries ==
=== At No. 12 Wisconsin ===
No. 19 Penn State at No. 12 Wisconsin – Game summary

Quarter	1	2	3	4	Total
No. 19 Penn State	0	0	7	9	16
No. 12 Wisconsin	0	0	7	3	10

at Camp Randall Stadium, Madison, Wisconsin

- Date: September 4
- Game time: 12:00 p.m. EDT
- Game weather: 66 °F (19 °C); cloudy
- Game attendance: 76,832
- Referee: Jerry McGinn
- TV announcers (FOX): Gus Johnson (play-by-play), Joel Klatt (analyst), and Jenny Taft (sideline)
- ESPN box score, GoPSUsports.com box score

Game information

First quarter

No scoring

Second quarter

No scoring

Third quarter

- PSU – Jahan Dotson, 49-yard TD pass from Sean Clifford, Jordan Stout kick, 12:08 (PSU, 7–0)
- UW – Chez Mellusi, 3-yard TD run, Collin Larsh kick, 8:01 (TIE, 7–7)

Fourth quarter

- UW – Larsh, 43-yard field goal, 13:36 (UW, 10–7)
- PSU – Stout, 24-yard field goal, 11:26 (TIE, 10–10)
- PSU – Noah Cain, 2-yard TD run, Stout kick missed, 9:17 (PSU, 16–10)

Statistics	PSU	UW
First downs	11	29
Plays–yards	51–297	95–359
Rushes–yards	18–50	58–174
Passing yards	247	185
Passing: comp–att–int	18–33–0	22–37–2
Turnovers		
Time of possession	17:09	42:51

Team	Category	Player	Statistics
Penn State	Passing	Sean Clifford	18/33, 247 yards, TD
Penn State	Rushing	Noah Cain	8 carries, 48 yards, TD
Penn State	Receiving	Jahan Dotson	5 receptions, 102 yards, TD
Wisconsin	Passing	Graham Mertz	22/37, 185 yards, 2 INT
Wisconsin	Rushing	Chez Mellusi	31 carries, 121 yards, TD
Wisconsin	Receiving	Danny Davis III	8 receptions, 99 yards

=== Ball State ===
Ball State at No. 11 Penn State – Game summary

Quarter	1	2	3	4	Total
Ball State	0	6	0	7	13
No. 11 Penn State	14	10	10	10	44

at Beaver Stadium, University Park, Pennsylvania

- Date: September 11
- Game time: 3:30 p.m. EDT
- Game weather: 73 °F (23 °C); partly sunny
- Game attendance: 105,323
- Referee: Ron Hudson
- TV announcers (FS1): Aaron Goldsmith (play-by-play) and Mark Helfrich (analyst)
- ESPN box score, GoPSUsports.com box score

Game information

First quarter

- PSU – Noah Cain, 5-yard TD run, Jordan Stout kick, 10:01 (PSU, 7–0)
- PSU – Sean Clifford, 1-yard TD run, Stout kick, 5:53 (PSU, 14–0)

Second quarter

- BSU – Jake Chanove, 24-yard field goal, 14:25 (PSU, 14–3)
- PSU – Stout, 45-yard field goal, 11:22 (PSU, 17–3)
- PSU – Jahan Dotson, 25-yard TD pass from Clifford, Stout kick, 2:50 (PSU, 24–3)
- BSU – Chanove, 23-yard field goal, 0:00 (PSU, 24–6)

Third quarter

- PSU – Jesse Luketa, 16-yard interception returned for TD, Stout kick, 5:56 (PSU, 31–6)
- PSU – Stout, 26-yard field goal, 1:53 (PSU, 34–6)

Fourth quarter

- PSU – Stout, 22-yard field goal, 9:59 (PSU, 37–6)
- BSU – Carson Steele, 6-yard TD run, Chanove kick, 6:58 (PSU, 37–13)
- PSU – Theo Johnson, 23-yard TD pass from Ta'Quan Roberson, Stout kick, 2:10 (PSU, 44–13)

Statistics	BSU	PSU
First downs	19	31
Plays–yards	71–295	79–493
Rushes–yards	26–69	48–240
Passing yards	226	253
Passing: comp–att–int	30–45–2	22–31–0
Turnovers		
Time of possession	26:00	34:00

Team	Category	Player	Statistics
Ball State	Passing	Drew Plitt	25/39, 176 yards, 2 INT
Ball State	Rushing	Carson Steele	7 carries, 18 yards, 1 TD
Ball State	Receiving	Jayshon Jackson	4 receptions, 42 yards
Penn State	Passing	Sean Clifford	21/29, 230 yards, 1 TD
Penn State	Rushing	Noah Cain	20 carries, 69 yards, 1 TD
Penn State	Receiving	Jahan Dotson	5 receptions, 65 yards, 1 TD

=== No. 22 Auburn ===
No. 22 Auburn at No. 10 Penn State – Game summary

Quarter	1	2	3	4	Total
No. 22 Auburn	3	7	7	3	20
No. 10 Penn State	7	7	7	7	28

at Beaver Stadium, University Park, Pennsylvania

- Date: September 18
- Game time: 7:30 p.m. EDT
- Game weather: 77 °F (25 °C); partly cloudy
- Game attendance: 109,958
- Referee: James Carter
- TV announcers (ABC): Chris Fowler (play-by-play), Kirk Herbstreit (analyst), and Holly Rowe (sideline)
- ESPN box score, GoPSUsports.com box score

Game information

First quarter

- AU – Anders Carlson, 45-yard field goal, 9:37 (AU, 3–0)
- PSU – Jahan Dotson, 4-yard TD pass from Sean Clifford, Jordan Stout kick, 2:24 (PSU, 7–3)

Second quarter

- AU – Tank Bigsby, 4-yard TD run, Carlson kick, 12:28 (AU, 10–7)
- PSU – Brenton Strange, 2-yard TD pass from Clifford, Stout kick, 1:23 (PSU, 14–10)

Third quarter

- PSU – Tyler Warren, 2-yard TD run, Stout kick, 13:06 (PSU, 21–10)
- AU – Bigsby, 6-yard TD run, Carlson kick, 5:52 (PSU, 21–17)

Fourth quarter

- AU – Carlson, 43-yard field goal, 14:55 (PSU, 21–20)
- PSU – Noah Cain, 3-yard TD run, Stout kick, 10:48 (PSU, 28–20)

Statistics	AU	PSU
First downs	24	22
Plays–yards	79–367	66–396
Rushes–yards	40–182	33–94
Passing yards	185	302
Passing: comp–att–int	21–39–0	29–33–1
Turnovers		
Time of possession	31:42	28:18

Team	Category	Player	Statistics
Auburn	Passing	Bo Nix	21/37, 185 yards
Auburn	Rushing	Tank Bigsby	23 carries, 102 yards, 2 TD
Auburn	Receiving	Kobe Hudson	4 receptions, 66 yards
Penn State	Passing	Sean Clifford	28/32, 280 yards, 2 TD, INT
Penn State	Rushing	Noah Cain	19 carries, 45 yards, TD
Penn State	Receiving	Jahan Dotson	10 receptions, 78 yards, TD

=== No. 11 (FCS) Villanova ===
No. 11 (FCS) Villanova at No. 6 Penn State – Game summary

Quarter	1	2	3	4	Total
No. 11 (FCS) Villanova	3	0	0	14	17
No. 6 Penn State	7	10	14	7	38

at Beaver Stadium, University Park, Pennsylvania

- Date: September 25
- Game time: 12:00 p.m. EDT
- Game weather: 70 °F (21 °C); sunny
- Game attendance: 105,790
- Referee: Jerry McGinn
- TV announcers (BTN): Mark Followill (play-by-play), Matt Millen (analyst), and Elise Menaker (sideline)
- ESPN box score, GoPSUsports.com

Game information

First quarter

- PSU – Jahan Dotson, 52-yard TD pass from Sean Clifford, Jordan Stout kick, 12:59 (PSU, 7–0)
- VU – Cole Bunce, 39-yard field goal, 1:21 (PSU, 7–3)

Second quarter

- PSU – Parker Washington, 52-yard TD pass from Clifford, Stout kick, 14:07 (PSU, 14–3)
- PSU – Stout, 29-yard field goal, 8:26 (PSU, 17–3)

Third quarter

- PSU – KeAndre Lambert-Smith, 83-yard TD pass from Clifford, Stout kick, 14:14 (PSU, 24–3)
- PSU – Washington, 23-yard TD pass from Clifford, Stout kick, 1:58 (PSU, 31–3)

Fourth quarter

- PSU – Tyler Warren, 3-yard TD run, Stout kick, 13:58 (PSU, 38–3)
- VU – Rayjoun Pringle, 57-yard TD pass from Daniel Smith, Bunce kick, 9:42 (PSU, 38–10)
- VU – Pringle, 17-yard TD pass from Smith, Bunce kick, 1:38 (PSU, 38–17)

Statistics	VU	PSU
First downs	15	20
Plays–yards	60–280	65–509
Rushes–yards	26–58	34–80
Passing yards	222	429
Passing: comp–att–int	20–34–1	22–31–1
Turnovers		
Time of possession	31:15	28:45

Team	Category	Player	Statistics
Villanova	Passing	Daniel Smith	20/34, 222 yards, 2 TD, INT
Villanova	Rushing	Jalen Jackson	7 carries, 58 yards
Villanova	Receiving	Rayjoun Pringle	4 receptions, 107 yards, 2 TD
Penn State	Passing	Sean Clifford	19/26, 401 yards, 4 TD, INT
Penn State	Rushing	John Lovett	11 carries, 45 yards
Penn State	Receiving	Parker Washington	5 receptions, 148 yards, 2 TD

=== Indiana ===
Indiana at No. 4 Penn State – Game summary

Quarter	1	2	3	4	Total
Indiana	0	0	0	0	0
No. 4 Penn State	7	7	7	3	24

at Beaver Stadium, University Park, Pennsylvania

- Date: October 2
- Game time: 7:30 p.m. EDT
- Game weather: 64 °F (18 °C); cloudy
- Game attendance: 105,951
- Referee: Ron Snodgrass
- TV announcers (ABC): Sean McDonough (play-by-play), Todd Blackledge (analyst), and Molly McGrath (sideline)
- ESPN box score, GoPSUsports.com box score

Game information

First quarter

- PSU – Brenton Strange, 10-yard TD pass from Sean Clifford, Jordan Stout kick, 5:28 (PSU, 7–0)

Second quarter

- PSU – Jahan Dotson, 8-yard TD pass from Clifford, Stout kick, 13:31 (PSU, 14–0)

Third quarter

- PSU – Dotson, 30-yard TD pass from Clifford, Stout kick, 4:16 (PSU, 21–0)

Fourth quarter

- PSU – Stout, 50-yard field goal, 8:06 (PSU, 24–0)

Statistics	IU	PSU
First downs	12	20
Plays–yards	58–264	76–408
Rushes–yards	24–69	42–209
Passing yards	195	199
Passing: comp–att–int	16–34–2	18–34–1
Turnovers		
Time of possession	25:07	34:53

Team	Category	Player	Statistics
Indiana	Passing	Michael Penix Jr.	10/22, 118 yards, INT
Indiana	Rushing	Stephen Carr	15 carries, 50 yards
Indiana	Receiving	Peyton Hendershot	5 receptions, 88 yards
Penn State	Passing	Sean Clifford	17/33, 178 yards, 3 TD, INT
Penn State	Rushing	Keyvone Lee	8 carries, 74 yards
Penn State	Receiving	Jahan Dotson	8 receptions, 84 yards, 2 TD

=== At No. 3 Iowa ===
No. 4 Penn State at No. 3 Iowa – Game summary

Quarter	1	2	3	4	Total
No. 4 Penn State	14	3	3	0	20
No. 3 Iowa	3	7	3	10	23

at Kinnick Stadium, Iowa City, Iowa

- Date: October 9
- Game time: 4:00 p.m. EDT
- Game weather: 82 °F (28 °C); cloudy
- Game attendance: 69,250
- Referee: John O'Neill
- TV announcers (FOX): Gus Johnson (play-by-play), Joel Klatt (analyst), and Jenny Taft (sideline)
- ESPN box score, GoPSUsports.com box score

Game information

First quarter

- UI – Caleb Shudak, 34-yard field goal, 11:08 (UI, 3–0)
- PSU – Noah Cain, 2-yard TD run, Jordan Stout kick, 8:37 (PSU, 7–3)
- PSU – Sean Clifford, 4-yard TD run, Stout kick 3:21 (PSU, 14–3)

Second quarter

- PSU – Stout, 32-yard field goal, 3:21 (PSU, 17–3)
- UI – Charlie Jones, 9-yard TD pass from Spencer Petras, Shudak kick, 7:08 (PSU, 17–10)

Third quarter

- PSU – Stout, 44-yard field goal, 6:40 (PSU, 20–10)
- UI – Shudak, 48-yard field goal, 1:36 (PSU, 20–13)

Fourth quarter

- UI – Shudak, 36-yard field goal, 8:08 (PSU, 20–16)
- UI – Nico Ragaini, 44-yard TD pass from Petras, Shudak kick, 6:26 (UI 23–20)

Statistics	PSU	UI
First downs	18	18
Plays–yards	79–287	76–305
Rushes–yards	33–107	45–110
Passing yards	180	195
Passing: comp–att–int	22–46–4	17–31–1
Turnovers		
Time of possession	24:07	35:50

Team	Category	Player	Statistics
Penn State	Passing	Sean Clifford	15/25, 146 yards, 2 INT
Penn State	Rushing	Sean Clifford	3 carries, 36 yards, TD
Penn State	Receiving	KeAndre Lambert-Smith	5 receptions, 61 yards
Iowa	Passing	Spencer Petras	17/31, 195 yards, 2 TD, INT
Iowa	Rushing	Tyler Goodson	25 carries, 88 yards
Iowa	Receiving	Nico Ragaini	4 receptions, 73 yards, TD

=== Illinois ===
Illinois at No. 7 Penn State – Game summary

Quarter	1	2	3	4	OT	2OT	3OT	4OT	5OT	6OT	7OT	8OT	9OT	Total
Illinois	0	7	0	3	3	3	0	0	0	0	0	2	2	20
No. 7 Penn State	7	3	0	0	3	3	0	0	0	0	0	2	0	18

at Beaver Stadium, University Park, Pennsylvania

- Date: October 23
- Game time: 12:00 p.m. EDT
- Game weather: 54 °F (12 °C); rain
- Game attendance: 105,001
- Referee: Reggie Smith
- TV announcers (ABC): Bob Wischusen (play-by-play), Dan Orlovsky (analyst), and Kris Budden (sideline)
- ESPN box score, GoPSUsports.com box score

Game information

First quarter

- PSU – KeAndre Lambert-Smith, 42-yard TD pass from Sean Clifford, Jordan Stout kick, 0:09 (PSU, 7–0)

Second quarter

- PSU – Stout, 35-yard field goal, 11:12 (PSU, 10–0)
- UI – Chase Brown, 1-yard TD run, James McCourt kick, 2:52 (PSU, 10–7)

Third quarter

No scoring

Fourth quarter

- UI – McCourt, 37-yard field goal, 11:49 (TIE, 10–10)

First overtime

- PSU – Stout, 31-yard field goal (PSU, 13–10)
- UI – McCourt, 39-yard field goal (TIE, 13–13)

Second overtime

- UI – McCourt, 22-yard field goal (UI, 16–13)
- PSU – Stout, 40-yard field goal, (TIE, 16–16)

Third overtime (2-point conversion attempts)

No scoring

Fourth overtime (2-point conversion attempts)

No scoring

Fifth overtime (2-point conversion attempts)

No scoring

Sixth overtime (2-point conversion attempts)

No scoring

Seventh overtime (2-point conversion attempts)

No scoring

Eighth overtime (2-point conversion attempts)

- UI – Isaiah Williams, 2-point conversion pass from Brandon Peters (UI, 18–16)
- PSU – Noah Cain, 2-point conversion rush (TIE, 18–18)

Ninth overtime (2-point conversion attempts)

- UI – Casey Washington, 2-point conversion pass from Peters (UI, 20–18)

Statistics	UI	PSU
First downs	26	14
Plays–yards	88–395	63–227
Rushes–yards	67–357	29–62
Passing yards	38	165
Passing: comp–att–int	8–21–1	19–34–0
Turnovers		
Time of possession	36:25	23:35

Team	Category	Player	Statistics
Illinois	Passing	Artur Sitkowski	8/19, 38 yards, INT
Illinois	Rushing	Chase Brown	33 carries, 223 yards, TD
Illinois	Receiving	Donny Navarro	2 receptions, 12 yards
Penn State	Passing	Sean Clifford	19/34, 165 yards, TD
Penn State	Rushing	Noah Cain	11 carries, 43 yards
Penn State	Receiving	Jahan Dotson	6 receptions, 69 yards

=== At No. 5 Ohio State ===
No. 20 Penn State at No. 5 Ohio State – Game summary

Quarter	1	2	3	4	Total
No. 20 Penn State	7	3	14	0	24
No. 5 Ohio State	3	14	10	6	33

at Ohio Stadium, Columbus, Ohio

- Date: October 30
- Game time: 7:30 p.m. EDT
- Game weather: 54 °F (12 °C); cloudy
- Game attendance: 102,951
- Referee: Mark Kluczynski
- TV announcers (ABC): Chris Fowler (play-by-play), Kirk Herbstreit (analyst), and Holly Rowe (sideline)
- ESPN box score, GoPSUsports.com box score

Game information

First quarter

- PSU – Brenton Strange, 5-yard TD pass from Sean Clifford, Jordan Stout kick, 6:08 (PSU, 7–0)
- OSU – Noah Ruggles, 35-yard field goal, 2:02 (PSU, 7–3)

Second quarter

- OSU – Chris Olave, 38-yard TD pass from C. J. Stroud, Ruggles kick, 3:48 (OSU, 10–7)
- OSU – Jerron Cage, 57-yard fumble recovery run for TD, Ruggles kick, 2:24 (OSU, 17–7)
- PSU – Stout, 47-yard field goal, 0:00 (OSU, 17–10)

Third quarter

- PSU – Jahan Dotson, 2-yard TD run, Stout kick, 10:26 (TIE, 17–17)
- OSU – Ruggles, 23-yard field goal, 6:42 (OSU, 20–17)
- OSU – TreVeyon Henderson, 1-yard TD run, Ruggles kick, 3:35 (OSU, 27–17)
- PSU – Keyvone Lee, 1-yard TD run, Stout kick, 0:10 (OSU, 27–24)

Fourth quarter

- OSU – Ruggles, 25-yard field goal, 7:12 (OSU, 30–24)
- OSU – Ruggles, 26-yard field goal, 2:41 (OSU, 33–24)

Statistics	PSU	OSU
First downs	27	22
Plays–yards	81–394	68–466
Rushes–yards	29–33	34–161
Passing yards	361	305
Passing: comp–att–int	35–52–1	22–34–0
Turnovers		
Time of possession	29:50	30:10

Team	Category	Player	Statistics
Penn State	Passing	Sean Clifford	35/52, 361 yards, TD, INT
Penn State	Rushing	John Lovett	13 carries, 20 yards
Penn State	Receiving	Jahan Dotson	11 receptions, 127 yards
Ohio State	Passing	C. J. Stroud	22/34, 305 yards, TD
Ohio State	Rushing	TreVeyon Henderson	28 carries, 152 yards, TD
Ohio State	Receiving	Jaxon Smith-Njigba	6 receptions, 97 yards

=== At Maryland ===
No. 22^{AP} Penn State at Maryland – Game summary

Quarter	1	2	3	4	Total
No. 22^{AP} Penn State	7	0	7	17	31
Maryland	0	6	0	8	14

at Maryland Stadium, College Park, Maryland

- Date: November 6
- Game time: 3:30 p.m. EDT
- Game weather: 53 °F (12 °C); cloudy
- Game attendance: 46,924
- Referee: John O'Neill
- TV announcers (FS1): Dan Hellie (play-by-play) and Petros Papadakis (analyst)
- ESPN box score, GoPSUsports.com box score

Game information

First quarter

- PSU – Jahan Dotson, 38-yard TD pass from Sean Clifford, Jordan Stout kick, 7:55 (PSU, 7–0)

Second quarter

- UM – Challen Faamatau, 2-yard TD run, Joseph Petrino kick failed, 1:15 (PSU, 7–6)

Third quarter

- PSU – Dotson, 21-yard TD pass from Clifford, Stout kick, 6:51 (PSU, 14–6)

Fourth quarter

- UM – Corey Dyches, 13-yard TD pass from Taulia Tagovailoa, Chig Okonkwo 2-point conversion pass from Tagovailoa, 14:56 (TIE, 14–14)
- PSU – Dotson, 86-yard TD pass from Clifford, Stout kick, 13:55 (PSU, 21–14)
- PSU – Stout, 24-yard field goal, 6:33 (PSU, 24–14)
- PSU – Ji'Ayir Brown, 87-yard interception return for TD, Stout kick, 2:39 (PSU, 31–14)

Statistics	UM	PSU
First downs	23	29
Plays–yards	80–456	85–419
Rushes–yards	33–93	27–48
Passing yards	363	371
Passing: comp–att–int	27–47–0	41–58–1
Turnovers		
Time of possession	31:33	28:27

Team	Category	Player	Statistics
Maryland	Passing	Taulia Tagovailoa	41/57, 371 yards, TD, INT
Maryland	Rushing	Challen Faamatau	11 carries, 38 yards, TD
Maryland	Receiving	Chig Okonkwo	12 receptions, 85 yards
Penn State	Passing	Sean Clifford	27/47, 363 yards, 3 TD
Penn State	Rushing	Keyvone Lee	8 carries, 50 yards
Penn State	Receiving	Jahan Dotson	11 receptions, 242 yards, 3 TD

=== No. 9^{AP}/6^{CFP} Michigan ===
No. 9^{AP}/6^{CFP} Michigan at No. 22^{AP} Penn State – Game summary

Quarter	1	2	3	4	Total
No. 9^{AP}/6^{CFP} Michigan	0	7	7	7	21
No. 23^{AP} Penn State	3	3	0	11	17

at Beaver Stadium, University Park, Pennsylvania

- Date: November 13
- Game time: 12:00 p.m. EST
- Game weather: 40 °F (4 °C); cloudy
- Game attendance: 109,534
- Referee: Michael Cannon
- TV announcers (ABC): Sean McDonough (play-by-play), Dan Orlovsky (analyst), and Molly McGrath (sideline)
- ESPN box score, GoPSUsports.com box score

Game information

First quarter

- PSU – Jordan Stout, 42-yard field goal, 9:56 (PSU, 3–0)

Second quarter

- UM – Roman Wilson, 21-yard TD pass from Cade McNamara, Jake Moody kick, 5:49 (UM, 7–3)
- PSU – Stout, 52-yard field goal, 0:31 (UM, 7–6)

Third quarter

- UM – Wilson, 1-yard TD pass from McNamara, Moody kick, 11:50 (UM, 14–6)

Fourth quarter

- PSU – Tyler Warren, 2-yard TD pass from Sean Clifford, Jahan Dotson 2-point conversion pass from Clifford, 7:35 (TIE, 14–14)
- PSU – Stout, 31-yard field goal, 5:55 (PSU, 17–14)
- UM – Erick All, 47-yard TD pass from McNamara, Moody kick, 3:29 (UM, 21–17)

Statistics	UM	PSU
First downs	21	20
Plays–yards	70–361	86–332
Rushes–yards	41–144	42–109
Passing yards	217	233
Passing: comp–att–int	19–29–0	24–44–0
Turnovers		
Time of possession	30:20	29:40

Team	Category	Player	Statistics
Michigan	Passing	Cade McNamara	19/29, 217 yards, 3 TD
Michigan	Rushing	Hassan Haskins	31 carries, 156 yards
Michigan	Receiving	Erick All	4 receptions, 64 yards, TD
Penn State	Passing	Sean Clifford	23/43, 205 yards, TD
Penn State	Rushing	Keyvone Lee	20 carries, 88 yards
Penn State	Receiving	Parker Washington	4 receptions, 92 yards

=== Rutgers ===
Rutgers at Penn State – Game summary

Quarter	1	2	3	4	Total
Rutgers	0	0	0	0	0
Penn State	0	7	14	7	28

at Beaver Stadium, University Park, Pennsylvania

- Date: November 20
- Game time: 12:00 p.m. EST
- Game weather: 39 °F (4 °C); cloudy
- Game attendance: 106,038
- Referee: Jeffrey Servinski
- TV announcers (BTN): Cory Provus (play-by-play), Matt Millen (analyst), and Elise Menaker (sideline)
- ESPN box score, GoPSUsports.com box score

Game information

First quarter

No scoring

Second quarter

- PSU – Jahan Dotson, 8-yard TD pass from Christian Veilleux, Jordan Stout kick, 1:03 (PSU, 7–0)

Third quarter

- PSU – Parker Washington, 17-yard TD pass from Veilleux, Stout kick, 3:32 (PSU, 14–0)
- PSU – Malick Meiga, 67-yard TD pass from Veilleux, Stout kick, 1:31 (PSU, 21–0)

Fourth quarter

- PSU – Keyvone Lee, 7-yard TD run, Stout kick, 7:32 (PSU, 28–0)

Statistics	RU	PSU
First downs	10	21
Plays–yards	60–160	74–407
Rushes–yards	32–67	42–149
Passing yards	93	258
Passing: comp–att–int	13–28–1	17–32–0
Turnovers		
Time of possession	26:26	33:34

Team	Category	Player	Statistics
Rutgers	Passing	Noah Vedral	12/23, 91 yards
Rutgers	Rushing	Johnny Langan	5 carries, 18 yards
Rutgers	Receiving	Bo Melton	3 receptions, 47 yards
Penn State	Passing	Christian Veilleux	15/24, 235 yards, 3 TD
Penn State	Rushing	Keyvone Lee	13 carries, 41 yards, TD
Penn State	Receiving	Parker Washington	6 receptions, 72 yards, TD

=== At No. 12^{AP/CFP} Michigan State ===
Penn State at No. 12^{AP/CFP} Michigan State – Game summary

Quarter	1	2	3	4	Total
Penn State	7	7	6	7	27
No. 12^{AP/CFP} Michigan State	14	3	6	7	30

at Spartan Stadium, East Lansing, Michigan

- Date: November 27
- Game time: 3:30 p.m. EST
- Game weather: 30 °F (−1 °C); snow
- Game attendance: 66,312
- Referee: Jeffrey Servinski
- TV announcers (ABC): Sean McDonough (play-by-play), Todd Blackledge (analyst), and Molly McGrath (sideline)
- ESPN box score, GoPSUsports.com box score

Game information

First quarter

- MSU – Kenneth Walker III, 2-yard TD run, Matt Coghlin kick, 11:22 (MSU, 7–0)
- MSU – Tre Mosley, 9-yard TD pass from Payton Thorne, Coghlin kick, 6:09 (MSU, 14–0)
- PSU – Jahan Dotson, 27-yard TD pass from Sean Clifford, Jordan Stout kick, 3:37 (MSU, 14–7)

Second quarter

- PSU – Dotson, 30-yard TD pass from Clifford, Stout kick, 12:11 (TIE, 14–14)
- MSU – Coghlin, 22-yard field goal, 5:59 (MSU, 17–14)

Third quarter

- PSU – Daequan Hardy, 17-yard interception return for TD, Stout kick failed, 11:07 (PSU, 20–17)
- MSU – Thorne, 1-yard TD run, Evan Johnson kick failed, 2:14 (MSU, 23–20)

Fourth quarter

- MSU – Jayden Reed, 20-yard TD pass from Thorne, Johnson kick, 5:10 (MSU, 30–20)
- PSU – Parker Washington, 15-yard TD pass from Clifford, Jake Pinegar kick, 0:43 (MSU, 30–27)

Statistics	PSU	MSU
First downs	19	21
Plays–yards	60–374	77–451
Rushes–yards	26–61	47–183
Passing yards	313	268
Passing: comp–att–int	23–34–0	19–30–1
Turnovers		
Time of possession	23:36	36:24

Team	Category	Player	Statistics
Penn State	Passing	Sean Clifford	23/34, 313 yards, 3 TD
Penn State	Rushing	Keyvone Lee	15 carries, 79 yards
Penn State	Receiving	Jahan Dotson	8 receptions, 137 yards, 2 TD
Michigan State	Passing	Payton Thorne	19/30, 268 yards, 2 TD, INT
Michigan State	Rushing	Kenneth Walker III	30 carries, 138 yards, TD
Michigan State	Receiving	Jayden Reed	6 receptions, 89 yards, TD

=== vs. No. 22^{AP}/21^{CFP} Arkansas (Outback Bowl) ===
Arkansas vs. Penn State – Game summary

Quarter	1	2	3	4	Total
Penn State	0	10	0	0	10
No. 22^{AP}/21^{CFP} Arkansas	7	0	17	0	24

at Raymond James Stadium, Tampa, Florida

- Date: January 1, 2022
- Game time: 12:00 p.m. EST
- Game weather: 77 °F (25 °C); mostly cloudy
- Game attendance: 46,577
- Referee: Tuta Salaam
- TV announcers (ESPN2): Dave Flemming (play-by-play), Rod Gilmore (analyst), and Stormy Buonantony (sideline)
- ESPN box score, GoPSUsports.com box score

Game information

First quarter

- UA – Raheim Sanders, 3-yard TD run, Cam Little kick, 0:00 (UA, 7–0)

Second quarter

- PSU – KeAndre Lambert-Smith, 42-yard TD pass from Sean Clifford, Jake Pinegar kick, 10:53 (TIE, 7–7)
- PSU – Pinegar, 33-yard field goal, 5:19 (PSU, 10–7)

Third quarter

- UA – KJ Jefferson, 8-yard TD run, Little kick, 12:42 (UA, 14–10)
- UA – Little, 36-yard field goal, 6:29 (UA, 17–10)
- UA – Sanders, 1-yard TD run, Little kick, 2:08 (UA, 24–10)

Fourth quarter

No scoring

Statistics	PSU	UA
First downs	17	25
Plays–yards	63–323	78–451
Rushes–yards	28–125	58–361
Passing yards	198	90
Passing: comp–att–int	15–35–2	14–20–2
Turnovers		
Time of possession	23:47	36:13

Team	Category	Player	Statistics
Penn State	Passing	Sean Clifford	14/32, 195 yards, TD, INT
Penn State	Rushing	Sean Clifford	11 carries, 47 yards
Penn State	Receiving	Parker Washington	7 receptions, 98 yards
Arkansas	Passing	KJ Jefferson	14/19, 90 yards, INT
Arkansas	Rushing	KJ Jefferson	20 carries, 110 yards, TD
Arkansas	Receiving	De'Vion Warren	3 receptions, 33 yards

== Rankings ==
Ranking movements Legend: ██ Increase in ranking ██ Decrease in ranking — = Not ranked RV = Received votes
	Week															
Poll	Pre	1	2	3	4	5	6	7	8	9	10	11	12	13	14	Final
AP	19	11	10	6	4	4	7	7	20	22	23	RV	RV	RV	RV	—
Coaches	20	13	12	8	6	4	8	8	17	23	23	RV	RV	RV	RV	—
CFP	Not released									—	—	—	—	—	—	Not released

== Awards and honors ==
All-American
Player	AP	AFCA	FWAA	TSN	Designation
Jaquan Brisker	2	3	2	2	None
Jahan Dotson	3	-	-	–	None
Jordan Stout	3	3	–	–	None
Arnold Ebiketie	-	-	2	-	None
The NCAA recognizes a selection to all five of the AP, AFCA, FWAA, TSN and WCFF first teams for unanimous selections and three of five for consensus selections. HM = Honorable mention. Source:
