= 2019 Penn State Nittany Lions football team =

American college football season

2019 Penn State Nittany Lions football

Lambert-Meadowlands Trophy Cotton Bowl Classic champion

Cotton Bowl Classic, W 53–39 vs. Memphis
- Conference: Big Ten Conference
- East Division

Ranking
- Coaches: No. 9
- AP: No. 9
- Record: 11–2 (7–2 Big Ten)
- Head coach: James Franklin (6th season)
- Offensive coordinator: Ricky Rahne (2nd season; regular season); Tyler Bowen (interim; Cotton Bowl)
- Offensive scheme: Spread
- Defensive coordinator: Brent Pry (4th season)
- Co-defensive coordinator: Tim Banks (4th season)
- Base defense: 4–3
- Home stadium: Beaver Stadium

2019 Big Ten Conference football standings
	Conf.			Overall
Team	W		L	W		L
East Division
No. 3 Ohio State xy$^	9	–	0	13	–	1
No. 9 Penn State	7	–	2	11	–	2
No. 18 Michigan	6	–	3	9	–	4
Indiana	5	–	4	8	–	5
Michigan State	4	–	5	7	–	6
Maryland	1	–	8	3	–	9
Rutgers	0	–	9	2	–	10
West Division
No. 11 Wisconsin xy	7	–	2	10	–	4
No. 10 Minnesota x	7	–	2	11	–	2
No. 15 Iowa	6	–	3	10	–	3
Illinois	4	–	5	6	–	7
Purdue	3	–	6	4	–	8
Nebraska	3	–	6	5	–	7
Northwestern	1	–	8	3	–	9
Championship: Ohio State 34, Wisconsin 21
^ – College Football Playoff participant; $ – Conference champion; x – Division champion/co-champions; y – Championship game participant; Rankings from AP Poll

The 2019 Penn State Nittany Lions football team represented Pennsylvania State University in the 2019 NCAA Division I FBS football season. The team was led by sixth-year head coach James Franklin and played its home games in Beaver Stadium in University Park, Pennsylvania.

Penn State competed as a member of the Big Ten East Division of the Big Ten Conference.

== Offseason ==
=== Staff changes ===
On January 2, 2019, James Franklin announced that wide receivers coach David Corley was relieved of his duties. This came just one day after Penn State's 27–24 loss to Kentucky in the Citrus Bowl. On January 10, former Duke assistant coach Gerad Parker was announced as the team's new wide receivers coach. On February 15, 2019, it was announced that special teams coordinator and assistant defensive line coach Phil Galiano would be leaving Penn State to become an assistant special teams coach with the New Orleans Saints. On February 21, 2019, Penn State hired Joe Lorig, from Texas Tech, as special teams coordinator and defensive assistant.

=== Recruiting ===
The Nittany Lions signed 19 recruits on early signing day in December 2018. Four recruits signed with Penn State on February 6, 2019, pushing their total commitments to 23.

College recruiting (2019)
Name	Hometown	School	Height	Weight	Commit date
Brandon Smith; ILB	Mineral, Virginia	Louisa County	6 ft 4 in (1.93 m)	228 lb (103 kg)	May 21, 2018
Brandon Smith; ILB	Recruit ratings: Rivals: 247Sports: ESPN:				
Adisa Isaac; DE	Brooklyn, New York	Canarsie	6 ft 5 in (1.96 m)	220 lb (100 kg)	Dec 17, 2018
Adisa Isaac; DE	Recruit ratings: Rivals: 247Sports: ESPN:				
Noah Cain; RB	Bradenton, Florida	IMG Academy	5 ft 10 in (1.78 m)	208 lb (94 kg)	Dec 19, 2018
Noah Cain; RB	Recruit ratings: Rivals: 247Sports: ESPN:				
Lance Dixon; OLB	West Bloomfield Township, Michigan	West Bloomfield	6 ft 2 in (1.88 m)	201 lb (91 kg)	Jul 1, 2018
Lance Dixon; OLB	Recruit ratings: Rivals: 247Sports: ESPN:				
Tyler Rudolph; S	Montville, Connecticut	St. Thomas More	6 ft 1 in (1.85 m)	205 lb (93 kg)	May 21, 2018
Tyler Rudolph; S	Recruit ratings: Rivals: 247Sports: ESPN:				
Ta'Quan Roberson; QB	Wayne, New Jersey	DePaul Catholic	6 ft 0 in (1.83 m)	185 lb (84 kg)	Oct 26, 2017
Ta'Quan Roberson; QB	Recruit ratings: Rivals: 247Sports: ESPN:				
Anthony Whigan; OT	Scranton, Pennsylvania	Lackawanna College	6 ft 5 in (1.96 m)	290 lb (130 kg)	Aug 7, 2018
Anthony Whigan; OT	Recruit ratings: Rivals: 247Sports: ESPN:				
Keaton Ellis; CB	State College, Pennsylvania	State College	6 ft 0 in (1.83 m)	180 lb (82 kg)	Sep 9, 2017
Keaton Ellis; CB	Recruit ratings: Rivals: 247Sports: ESPN:				
Brenton Strange; TE	Parkersburg, West Virginia	Parkersburg	6 ft 5 in (1.96 m)	210 lb (95 kg)	Oct 1, 2018
Brenton Strange; TE	Recruit ratings: Rivals: 247Sports: ESPN:				
Michael Johnson Jr. QB	Eugene, Oregon	Sheldon	6 ft 2 in (1.88 m)	192 lb (87 kg)	Aug 1, 2018
Michael Johnson Jr. QB	Recruit ratings: Rivals: 247Sports: ESPN:				
Marquis Wilson; CB	Windsor, Connecticut	Windsor	6 ft 0 in (1.83 m)	175 lb (79 kg)	May 20, 2018
Marquis Wilson; CB	Recruit ratings: Rivals: 247Sports: ESPN:				
Devyn Ford; RB	Stafford, Virginia	North Stafford	5 ft 11 in (1.80 m)	183 lb (83 kg)	May 18, 2018
Devyn Ford; RB	Recruit ratings: Rivals: 247Sports: ESPN:				
Caedan Wallace; OG	Princeton, New Jersey	Hun School	6 ft 5 in (1.96 m)	288 lb (131 kg)	Apr 21, 2018
Caedan Wallace; OG	Recruit ratings: Rivals: 247Sports: ESPN:				
John Dunmore; WR	Hollywood, Florida	Chaminade-Madonna Prep	6 ft 2 in (1.88 m)	172 lb (78 kg)	Jul 4, 2018
John Dunmore; WR	Recruit ratings: Rivals: 247Sports: ESPN:				
D'Von Ellies; DT	Owings Mills, Maryland	McDonogh	6 ft 2 in (1.88 m)	280 lb (130 kg)	Jan 20, 2019
D'Von Ellies; DT	Recruit ratings: Rivals: 247Sports: ESPN:				
Saleem Wormley; OG	Smyrna, Delaware	Smyrna	6 ft 3 in (1.91 m)	318 lb (144 kg)	Jul 23, 2018
Saleem Wormley; OG	Recruit ratings: Rivals: 247Sports: ESPN:				
Hakeem Beamon; DE	Midlothian, Virginia	Manchester	6 ft 3 in (1.91 m)	259 lb (117 kg)	Jun 1, 2018
Hakeem Beamon; DE	Recruit ratings: Rivals: 247Sports: ESPN:				
Joey Porter Jr. CB	Wexford, Pennsylvania	North Allegheny	6 ft 2 in (1.88 m)	185 lb (84 kg)	Sep 11, 2018
Joey Porter Jr. CB	Recruit ratings: Rivals: 247Sports: ESPN:				
Jaquan Brisker; S	Scranton, Pennsylvania	Lackawanna College	6 ft 2 in (1.88 m)	197 lb (89 kg)	May 17, 2018
Jaquan Brisker; S	Recruit ratings: Rivals: 247Sports: ESPN:				
Smith Vilbert; SDE	Montvale, New Jersey	Saint Joseph Regional	6 ft 6 in (1.98 m)	250 lb (110 kg)	
Smith Vilbert; SDE	Recruit ratings: Rivals: 247Sports: ESPN:				
Joseph Appiah Darkwa; DT	Düsseldorf, Germany	U 19 A	6 ft 5 in (1.96 m)	270 lb (120 kg)	Feb 1, 2019
Joseph Appiah Darkwa; DT	Recruit ratings: Rivals: 247Sports: ESPN:				
Daequan Hardy; CB	Pittsburgh, Pennsylvania	Penn Hills	5 ft 10 in (1.78 m)	160 lb (73 kg)	Feb 5, 2019
Daequan Hardy; CB	Recruit ratings: Rivals: 247Sports:				
TJ Jones; WR	Lake City, Florida	Columbia	6 ft 1 in (1.85 m)	185 lb (84 kg)	Feb 6, 2019
TJ Jones; WR	Recruit ratings: Rivals: 247Sports:				
Overall recruit ranking: Rivals: 11 247Sports: 13 ESPN: 13
Note: In many cases, Scout, Rivals, 247Sports, On3, and ESPN may conflict in their listings of height and weight.; In these cases, the average was taken. ESPN grades are on a 100-point scale.; Sources: "Penn State Football Commitments". Rivals.; "ESPN". ESPN.; "2019 Team Ranking". Rivals.com.

=== 2019 NFL draft ===
Player	Position	Round	Pick	Team
Miles Sanders	Running back	2	53	Philadelphia Eagles
Connor McGovern	Offensive lineman	3	90	Dallas Cowboys
Shareef Miller	Defensive end	4	138	Philadelphia Eagles
Amani Oruwariye	Cornerback	5	146	Detroit Lions
Trace McSorley	Quarterback	6	197	Baltimore Ravens
Nick Scott	Safety	7	243	Los Angeles Rams
Kyle Vasey	Long snapper	UFA		Atlanta Falcons
Kevin Givens	Defensive tackle	UFA		San Francisco 49ers
Ryan Bates	Offensive lineman	UFA		Philadelphia Eagles
DeAndre Thompkins	Wide receiver	UFA		Philadelphia Eagles
Koa Farmer	Outside linebacker	UFA		Oakland Raiders
Johnathan Thomas	Running back	UFA		Cincinnati Bengals
Chasz Wright	Offensive tackle	UFA		

=== Transfers ===
The Nittany Lions added 2 players and lost 12 players due to transfer.

Name	Pos.	Height	Weight	Year	Hometown	Transfer from
Weston Carr	WR	6'2	200	Senior (redshirt)	Benicia, CA	Azusa Pacific
Jordan Stout	K	6'2	197	Sophomore (redshirt)	Honaker, VA	Virginia Tech

Name	Number	Pos.	Height	Weight	Year	Hometown	Transfer to
Manny Bowen	#43	OLB	6'2	231	Senior (redshirt)	Barnegat, NJ	Utah
Torrence Brown	#19	DE	6'3	257	Senior (redshirt)	Tuscaloosa, AL	Southern Miss
Danny Dalton	#80	TE	6'4	247	Junior (redshirt)	Marshfield, MA	Boston College
Dae'lun Darien	#41	OLB	6'4	223	Junior (redshirt)	Baltimore, MD	Delaware
Alex Gellerstedt	#51	OL	6'6	311	Junior (redshirt)	Dublin, OH	Virginia
Isaiah Humphries	#2	S	6'0	187	Freshman (redshirt)	Rowlett, TX	California
Sterling Jenkins	#76	OT	6'8	334	Senior (redshirt)	Pittsburgh, PA	Duquesne
Juwan Johnson	#84	WR	6'4	225	Senior (redshirt)	Glassboro, NJ	Oregon
Zech McPhearson	#14	CB	5'11	184	Junior (redshirt)	Columbia, MD	Texas Tech
Jarvis Miller	#9	OLB	6'2	223	Senior (redshirt)	Suffield, CT	UMass
Ayron Monroe	#23	S	5'11	206	Senior (redshirt)	Largo, MD	Temple
Tommy Stevens	#2	QB	6'5	230	Senior (redshirt)	Indianapolis, IN	Mississippi State

=== Returning starters ===
==== Offense (9) ====
Player	Class	Position	2018	Career
Steven Gonzalez	Senior (redshirt)	Guard	13 games	29 games
Will Fries	Junior (redshirt)	Offensive tackle	11 games	20 games
K. J. Hamler	Sophomore (redshirt)	Wide receiver	13 games	13 games
Michal Menet	Junior (redshirt)	Center	12 games	12 games
Pat Freiermuth	Sophomore	Tight end	9 games	9 games
Jahan Dotson	Sophomore	Wide receiver	4 games	4 games
Mac Hippenhammer	Sophomore (redshirt)	Wide receiver	1 game	1 game
Mike Miranda	Sophomore (redshirt)	Guard	1 game	1 game
Cam Sullivan-Brown	Sophomore (redshirt)	Wide receiver	1 game	1 game

==== Defense (11) ====
Player	Class	Position	2018	Career
John Reid	Senior (redshirt)	Cornerback	11 games	27 games
Cam Brown	Senior	Linebacker	12 games	14 games
Jan Johnson	Senior (redshirt)	Linebacker	13 games	13 games
Robert Windsor	Senior (redshirt)	Defensive tackle	12 games	13 games
Yetur Gross-Matos	Junior	Defensive end	13 games	13 games
Garrett Taylor	Senior (redshirt)	Safety	12 game	12 games
Tariq Castro-Fields	Junior	Cornerback	2 games	2 games
Fred Hansard	Sophomore (redshirt)	Defensive tackle	1 game	1 game
Micah Parsons	Sophomore	Linebacker	1 game	1 game
Antonio Shelton	Junior (redshirt)	Defensive tackle	1 game	1 game
Jonathan Sutherland	Sophomore (redshirt)	Safety	1 game	1 game

==== Special teams (2) ====
Player	Class	Position	2018	Career
Blake Gillikin	Senior	Punter	13 games	39 games
Jake Pinegar	Sophomore	Kicker	13 games	13 games

=== Preseason Big Ten poll ===
Although the Big Ten Conference has not held an official preseason poll since 2010, Cleveland.com has polled sports journalists representing all member schools as a de facto preseason media poll since 2011. For the 2019 poll, Penn State was projected to finish in fourth in the East Division.

== Schedule ==
=== Spring game ===
Date	Time	Spring Game	Site	Result	Attendance
April 13	3:00 p.m.	Blue vs. White	Beaver Stadium • University Park, PA	Blue 24–7	61,000

=== Regular season ===
The team hosted three non-conference games against the Idaho Vandals (first ever meeting) from the Big Sky Conference, Buffalo Bulls from the Mid-American Conference (MAC) and the Pittsburgh Panthers from the Atlantic Coast Conference (ACC).

During the 2019 Nittany Lions season, Penn State went against Big Ten conference opponents Maryland, Purdue, Iowa, Michigan, Michigan State, Minnesota, Indiana, Ohio State and Rutgers. The 2019 schedule consisted of 7 home games and 5 away.

Date	Time	Opponent	Rank	Site	TV	Result	Attendance
August 31	3:30 p.m.	Idaho*	No. 15	Beaver Stadium; State College, PA	BTN	W 79–7	104,527
September 7	7:30 p.m.	Buffalo*	No. 15	Beaver Stadium; State College, PA	FOX	W 45–13	104,136
September 14	12:00 p.m.	Pittsburgh*	No. 13	Beaver Stadium; State College, PA (rivalry)	ABC	W 17–10	108,661
September 27	8:00 p.m.	at Maryland	No. 12	Maryland Stadium; College Park, MD (rivalry)	FS1	W 59–0	53,228
October 5	12:00 p.m.	Purdue^{†}	No. 12	Beaver Stadium; State College, PA	ESPN	W 35–7	106,536
October 12	7:30 p.m.	at No. 17 Iowa	No. 10	Kinnick Stadium; Iowa City, IA	ABC	W 17–12	69,034
October 19	7:30 p.m.	No. 16 Michigan	No. 7	Beaver Stadium; State College, PA (rivalry, College GameDay)	ABC	W 28–21	110,669
October 26	3:30 p.m.	at Michigan State	No. 6	Spartan Stadium; East Lansing, MI (rivalry)	ABC	W 28–7	70,298
November 9	12:00 p.m.	at No. 17 Minnesota	No. 4	TCF Bank Stadium; Minneapolis, MN (Governor's Victory Bell)	ABC	L 26–31	51,883
November 16	12:00 p.m.	Indiana	No. 9	Beaver Stadium; State College, PA	ABC	W 34–27	106,323
November 23	12:00 p.m.	at No. 2 Ohio State	No. 8	Ohio Stadium; Columbus, OH (rivalry, Big Noon Kickoff, College GameDay)	FOX	L 17–28	104,355
November 30	3:30 p.m.	Rutgers	No. 10	Beaver Stadium; State College, PA	BTN	W 27–6	98,895
December 28	12:00 p.m.	vs. No. 17 Memphis*	No. 10	AT&T Stadium; Arlington, TX (Cotton Bowl Classic)	ESPN	W 53–39	54,828
*Non-conference game; ^{†}Homecoming; Rankings from AP Poll and CFP Rankings (after November 5) released prior to game; All times are in Eastern time

== Game summaries ==
=== Idaho ===
Idaho vs. Penn State – Game summary

Quarter	1	2	3	4	Total
Idaho (FCS)	0	0	0	7	7
No. 15 Penn State	20	24	14	21	79

at Beaver Stadium, University Park, Pennsylvania

- Date: August 31
- Game time: 3:30 p.m. EDT
- Game weather: 73 °F (23 °C); partly sunny
- Game attendance: 104,527
- Referee: Tom Stapleton
- TV announcers (BTN): Brandon Gaudin, James Laurinaitis, Elise Menaker
- ESPN Box Score, GoPSUsports.com

Game information

First quarter

- PSU – Jake Pinegar, 28-yard field goal, 11:30 (PSU 3–0)
- PSU – Jordan Stout, 53-yard field goal, 8:35 (PSU 6–0)
- PSU – Journey Brown, 23-yard TD run, Pinegar kick good, 5:03 (PSU 13–0)
- PSU – Ricky Slade, 1-yard TD run, Pinegar kick good, 1:50 (PSU 20–0)

Second quarter

- PSU – K. J. Hamler, 36-yard TD pass from Sean Clifford, Pinegar kick good, 10:28 (PSU 27–0)
- PSU – Devyn Ford, 81-yard TD run, Pinegar kick good, 4:27 (PSU 34–0)
- PSU – Hamler, 21-yard TD pass from Clifford, Pinegar kick good, 1:39 (PSU 41–0)
- PSU – Pinegar, 38-yard field goal, 0:00 (PSU 44–0)

Third quarter

- PSU – Journey Brown, 2-yard TD run, Pinegar kick good, 13:11 (PSU 51–0)
- PSU – Noah Cain, 3-yard TD run, Pinegar kick good, 11:28 (PSU 58–0)

Fourth quarter

- PSU – Brenton Strange, 4-yard TD pass from Will Levis, Pinegar kick good, 14:51 (PSU 65–0)
- UI – Logan Kendall, 1-yard TD pass from Mason Petrino, Cade Coffey kick good, 12:35 (PSU 65–7)
- PSU – Cain, 9-yard TD run, Pinegar kick good, 7:48 (PSU 72–7)
- PSU – Nick Eury, 8-yard TD run, Pinegar kick good, 2:17 (PSU 79–7)

Top passers

- UI – Mason Petrino – 11/17, 91 yards, TD, INT
- PSU – Sean Clifford – 14/23, 280 yards, 2 TD

Top rushers

- UI – Aundre Carter – 14 carries, 32 yards
- PSU – Devyn Ford – 6 carries, 107 yards, TD

Top receivers

- UI – Jeff Cotton – 6 receptions, 83 yards
- PSU – K. J. Hamler – 4 receptions, 115 yards, 2 TD

Top defenders

- UI – Tre Walker – 8 tackles, 2 tackles-for-loss (TFL)
- PSU – Lamont Wade – 4 tackles

=== Buffalo ===
Buffalo vs. Penn State – Game summary

Quarter	1	2	3	4	Total
Buffalo	0	10	3	0	13
No. 15 Penn State	7	0	28	10	45

at Beaver Stadium, University Park, Pennsylvania

- Date: September 7
- Game time: 7:30 p.m. EDT
- Game weather: 72 °F (22 °C); intermittent clouds
- Game attendance: 104,136
- Referee: Michael Cannon
- TV announcers (FOX): Tim Brando, Spencer Tillman, Coley Harvey
- ESPN Box Score, GoPSUsports.com

Game information

First quarter

- PSU – Jahan Dotson, 28-yard TD pass from Sean Clifford, Jake Pinegar kick good, 8:50 (PSU 7–0)

Second quarter

- UB – Alex McNulty, 32-yard field goal, 9:42 (PSU 7–3)
- UB – Julien Bourassa, 6-yard TD pass from Matt Myers, McNulty kick good, 0:14 (UB 10–7)

Third quarter

- PSU – John Reid, 36-yard interception return for TD, Pinegar kick good, 12:58 (PSU 14–10)
- PSU – Pat Freiermuth, 23-yard TD pass from Clifford, Pinegar kick good, 11:54 (PSU 21–10)
- UB – McNulty, 25-yard field goal, 6:59 (PSU 21–13)
- PSU – Noah Cain, 2-yard TD run, Pinegar kick good, 6:12 (PSU 28–13)
- PSU – Freiermuth, 28-yard TD pass from Clifford, Pinegar kick good, 2:56 (PSU 35–13)

Fourth quarter

- PSU – Pinegar, 32-yard field goal, 13:58 (PSU 38–13)
- PSU – Dotson, 56-yard TD pass from Clifford, Pinegar kick good, 3:03 (PSU 45–13)

Top passers

- UB – Matt Myers – 16/31, 245 yards, TD, INT
- PSU – Sean Clifford – 16/22, 279 yards, 4 TD

Top rushers

- UB – Jaret Patterson – 23 carries, 71 yards
- PSU – Sean Clifford – 11 carries, 51 yards

Top receivers

- UB – Antonio Nunn – 5 receptions, 113 yards
- PSU – Jahan Dotson – 4 receptions, 109 yards, 2 TD

Top defenders

- UB – Joey Banks – 11 tackles, 1 tackle-for-loss (TFL), 1 sack
- PSU – Jan Johnson – 12 tackles

=== Pittsburgh ===
Pittsburgh vs. Penn State – Game summary

Quarter	1	2	3	4	Total
Pittsburgh	0	10	0	0	10
No. 13 Penn State	7	3	7	0	17

at Beaver Stadium, University Park, Pennsylvania

- Date: September 14
- Game time: 12:00 p.m. EDT
- Game weather: 66 °F (19 °C); delayed start due to lightning; cloudy, showers
- Game attendance: 108,661
- Referee: Riley Johnson
- TV announcers (ABC): Chris Fowler, Todd Blackledge, Holly Rowe
- ESPN Box Score, GoPSUsports.com

Game information

First quarter

- PSU – Devyn Ford, 1-yard TD run, Jake Pinegar kick good, 4:31 (PSU 7–0)

Second quarter

- UP – Alex Kessman, 25-yard field goal, 6:34 (PSU 7–3)
- UP – Vincent Davis, 3-yard TD run, Kessman kick good, 2:08 (UP 10–7)
- PSU – Jordan Stout, 57-yard field goal, 0:01 (TIE 10–10)

Third quarter

- PSU – Noah Cain, 13-yard TD run, Pinegar kick good, 5:50 (PSU 17–10)

Fourth quarter

No scoring

Top passers

- UP – Kenny Pickett – 35/51, 372 yards
- PSU – Sean Clifford – 14/30, 222 yards

Top rushers

- UP – Shocky Jacques-Louis – 1 carry, 9 yards
- PSU – Journey Brown – 10 carries, 109 yards

Top receivers

- UP – Taysir Mack – 12 receptions, 125 yards
- PSU – K. J. Hamler – 3 receptions, 68 yards

Top defenders

- UP – Paris Ford – 11 tackles
- PSU – Micah Parsons – 9 tackles, 2 tackles-for-loss (TFL)

=== At Maryland ===
Penn State at Maryland – Game summary

Quarter	1	2	3	4	Total
No. 12 Penn State	14	24	7	14	59
Maryland	0	0	0	0	0

at Maryland Stadium, College Park, MD

- Date: September 27
- Game time: 8:00 p.m. EDT
- Game weather: 76 °F (24 °C); clear
- Game attendance: 53,228
- Referee: Daniel Capron
- TV announcers (FS1): Tim Brando, Spencer Tillman, Coley Harvey
- ESPN Box Score, GoPSUsports.com

Game information

First quarter

- PSU – Sean Clifford, 8-yard TD run, Jake Pinegar kick good, 12:55 (PSU 7–0)
- PSU – K. J. Hamler, 58-yard TD pass from Clifford, Pinegar kick good, 9:36 (PSU 14–0)

Second quarter

- PSU – Ricky Slade, 3-yard TD run, Pinegar kick good, 13:23 (PSU 21–0)
- PSU – Nick Bowers, 15-yard TD pass from Clifford, Pinegar kick good, 9:40 (PSU 28–0)
- PSU – Journey Brown, 37-yard TD pass from Clifford, Pinegar kick good, 3:04 (PSU 35–0)
- PSU – Pinegar, 21-yard field goal, 0:00 (PSU 38–0)

Third quarter

- PSU – J. Brown, 1-yard TD run, 7:16 (PSU 45–0)

Fourth quarter

- PSU – Will Levis, 5-yard TD run, Pinegar kick good, 6:37 (PSU 52–0)
- PSU – Levis, 8-yard TD run, Pinegar kick good, 0:49 (PSU 59–0)

Top passers

- PSU – Sean Clifford – 26/31, 398 yards, 3 TD, INT
- UM – Josh Jackson – 10/21, 65 yards, 2 INT

Top rushers

- PSU – Sean Clifford – 7 carries, 54 yards, TD
- UM – Anthony McFarland Jr. – 9 carries, 24 yards

Top receivers

- PSU – K. J. Hamler – 6 receptions, 108 yards, TD
- UM – Tayon Fleet-Davis – 11 yards

Top defenders

- PSU – Ellis Brooks – 6 tackles, 2.5 tackles-for-loss (TFL), 2.5 sacks
- UM – Antoine Brooks – 6 tackles, 2 tackles-for loss (TFL)

=== Purdue ===
Purdue vs. Penn State – Game summary

Quarter	1	2	3	4	Total
Purdue	0	7	0	0	7
No. 12 Penn State	21	7	0	7	35

at Beaver Stadium, University Park, Pennsylvania

- Date: October 5
- Game time: 12:00 p.m. EDT
- Game weather: 54 °F (12 °C); mostly sunny
- Game attendance: 106,536
- Referee: Jeff Servinski
- TV announcers (ESPN): Bob Wischusen, Dan Orlovsky, Allison Williams
- ESPN Box Score, GoPSUsports.com

Game information

First quarter

- PSU – K. J. Hamler, 23- yard TD pass from Sean Clifford, Jake Pinegar kick good, 10:22 (PSU 7–0)
- PSU – Clifford, 3-yard TD run, Pinegar kick good, 7:04 (PSU 14–0)
- PSU – Jahan Dotson, 72-yard TD pass from Clifford, Pinegar kick good, 5:20 (PSU 21–0)

Second quarter

- PSU – Pat Freiermuth, 7-yard TD pass from Clifford, Pinegar kick good, 14:17 (PSU 28–0)
- PU – Amad Anderson, 15-yard TD pass from Jack Plummer, J. D. Dellinger kick good, 7:18 (PSU 28–7)

Third quarter

No scoring

Fourth quarter

- PSU – Noah Cain, 2-yard TD run, Pinegar kick good, 5:44 (PSU 35–7)

Top passers

- PU – Jack Plummer – 13/27, 119 yards, TD
- PSU – Sean Clifford – 20/29, 264 yards, 3 TD, INT

Top rushers

- PU – King Doerue – 11 carries, 26 yards
- PSU – Noah Cain – 12 carries, 105 yards, TD

Top receivers

- PU – David Bell – 3 receptions, 59 yards
- PSU – Jahan Dotson – 2 receptions, 79 yards, TD

Top defenders

- PU – Ben Holt – 11 tackles
- PSU – Lamont Wade – 11 tackles, 1 tackle-for-loss (TFL), 1 sack

=== At No. 17 Iowa ===
Penn State at Iowa – Game summary

Quarter	1	2	3	4	Total
No. 10 Penn State	0	7	3	7	17
No. 17 Iowa	3	3	0	6	12

at Kinnick Stadium, Iowa City, IA

- Date: October 12
- Game time: 7:30 p.m. EDT
- Game weather: 52 °F (11 °C); mostly cloudy, windy
- Game attendance: 69,034
- Referee: John O'Neill
- TV announcers (ABC): Sean McDonough, Todd Blackledge, Holly Rowe
- ESPN Box Score, GoPSUsports.com

Game information

First quarter

- UI – Keith Duncan, 47-yard field goal, 2:12 (UI 3–0)

Second quarter

- PSU – K. J. Hamler, 22-yard TD pass from Sean Clifford, Jake Pinegar kick good, 8:36 (PSU 7–3)
- UI – Duncan, 24-yard field goal, 0:20 (PSU 7–6)

Third quarter

- PSU – Pinegar, 33-yard field goal, 2:08 (PSU 10–6)

Fourth quarter

- PSU – Noah Cain, 5-yard TD run, Pinegar kick good, 5:17 (PSU 17–6)
- UI – Brandon Smith, 33-yard TD pass from Nate Stanley, 2-point conversion pass intercepted, 2:31 (PSU 17–12)

Top passers

- PSU – Sean Clifford – 12/24, 117 yards, TD
- UI – Nate Stanley – 25/43, 286 yards, TD, INT

Top rushers

- PSU – Noah Cain – 22 carries, 102 yards, TD
- UI – Tyler Goodson – 8 carries, 35 yards

Top receivers

- PSU – K. J. Hamler – 7 receptions, 61 yards, TD
- UI – Brandon Smith – 7 receptions, 86 yards, TD

Top defenders

- PSU – P. J. Mustipher – 7 tackles, 1 tackle-for-loss (TFL)
- UI – Jack Koerner – 13 tackles

=== No. 16 Michigan ===
Michigan vs. Penn State – Game summary

Quarter	1	2	3	4	Total
No. 16 Michigan	0	7	7	7	21
No. 7 Penn State	7	14	0	7	28

at Beaver Stadium, University Park, Pennsylvania

- Date: October 19
- Game time: 7:30 p.m. EDT
- Game weather: 54 °F (12 °C); clear, cool, crisp
- Game attendance: 110,669
- Referee: Ron Snodgrass
- TV announcers (ABC): Chris Fowler, Kirk Herbstreit, Maria Taylor
- ESPN Box Score, GoPSUsports.com

Game information

First quarter

- PSU – Pat Freiermuth, 17-yard TD pass from Sean Clifford, Jake Pinegar kick good, 5:59 (PSU 7–0)

Second quarter

- PSU – Clifford, 2-yard TD run, Pinegar kick good, 14:56 (PSU 14–0)
- PSU – K. J. Hamler, 25-yard TD pass from Clifford, Pinegar kick good, 7:22 (PSU 21–0)
- UM – Zach Charbonnet, 12-yard TD run, Jake Moody kick good, 2:55 (PSU 21–7)

Third quarter

- UM – Charbonnet, 12-yard TD run, Moody kick good, 1:05 (PSU 21–14)

Fourth quarter

- PSU – Hamler, 53-yard TD pass from Clifford, Pinegar kick good, 13:14 (PSU 28–14)
- UM – Shea Patterson, 1-yard TD run, Moody kick good, 8:48 (PSU 28–21)

Top passers

- UM – Shea Patterson – 24/41, 276 yards, 1 INT
- PSU – Sean Clifford – 14/25, 182 yards, 3 TD

Top rushers

- UM – Zach Charbonnet – 15 carries, 81 yards, 2 TD
- PSU – Ricky Slade – 3 carries, 48 yards

Top receivers

- UM – Nico Collins – 6 receptions, 89 yards
- PSU – K. J. Hamler – 6 receptions, 108 yards, 2 TD

Top defenders

- UM – Kwity Paye – 10 tackles, 0.5 tackles-for-loss (TFL)
- PSU – Micah Parsons – 14 tackles

=== At Michigan State ===
Penn State at Michigan State – Game summary

Quarter	1	2	3	4	Total
No. 6 Penn State	7	14	7	0	28
Michigan State	0	0	7	0	7

at Spartan Stadium, East Lansing, MI

- Date: October 26
- Game time: 3:30 p.m. EDT
- Game weather: 47 °F (8 °C); steady rain
- Game attendance: 70,298
- Referee: Jerry McGinn
- TV announcers (ABC): Sean McDonough, Todd Blackledge, Holly Rowe
- ESPN Box Score, GoPSUsports.com

Game information

First quarter

- PSU – Pat Freiermuth, 16-yard TD pass from Sean Clifford, Jake Pinegar kick good, 6:54 (PSU 7–0)

Second quarter

- PSU – Freiermuth, 19-yard TD pass from Clifford, Pinegar kick missed, 14:30 (PSU 13–0)
- PSU – K. J. Hamler, 27-yard TD pass from Clifford, Clifford run for 2-point conversion, 1:20 (PSU 21–0)

Third quarter

- PSU – Freiermuth, 6-yard TD pass from Clifford, Pinegar kick good, 10:10 (PSU 28–0)
- MSU – Anthony Williams Jr., 4-yard TD run, Matt Coghlin kick good, 7:34 (PSU 28–7)

Fourth quarter

No scoring

Top passers

- PSU – Sean Clifford – 18/32, 189 yards, 4 TD, INT
- MSU – Brian Lewerke – 16/34, 165 yards, INT

Top rushers

- PSU – Journey Brown – 12 carries, 45 yards
- MSU – Elijah Collins – 17 carries, 53 yards

Top receivers

- PSU – Pat Freiermuth – 5 receptions, 60 yards, 3 TD
- MSU – Cody White – 3 receptions, 66 yards

Top defenders

- PSU – Micah Parsons – 12 tackles
- MSU – Tyriq Thompson – 11 tackles, 1 tackle-for-loss (TFL)

=== At No. 13^{AP}/17^{CFP} Minnesota ===
Penn State at Minnesota – Game summary

Quarter	1	2	3	4	Total
No. 5^{AP}/4^{CFP} Penn State	10	3	6	7	26
No. 13^{AP}/17^{CFP} Minnesota	14	10	0	7	31

at TCF Bank Stadium, Minneapolis, MN

- Date: November 9
- Game time: 12:00 p.m. ET
- Game weather: 39 °F (4 °C); mostly cloudy
- Game attendance: 51,883
- Referee: Mark Kluczynski
- TV announcers (ABC): Sean McDonough, Todd Blackledge, Holly Rowe
- ESPN Box Score, GoPSUsports.com

Game information

First quarter

- UM – Rashod Bateman, 66-yard TD pass from Tanner Morgan, Brock Walker kick good, 12:06 (UM 7–0)
- PSU – Journey Brown, 45-yard TD pass from Sean Clifford, Jake Pinegar kick good, 10:51 (TIE 7–7)
- UM – Chris Autman-Bell, 21-yard TD pass from Morgan, Walker kick good, 4:29 (UM 14–7)
- PSU – Pinegar, 33-yard field goal, 2:12 (UM 14–10)

Second quarter

- UM – Tyler Johnson, 38-yard TD pass from Morgan, Walker kick good, 7:18 (UM 21–10)
- UM – Walker, 26-yard field goal, 3:36 (UM 24–10)
- PSU – Pinegar, 21-yard field goal, 0:00 (UM 24–13)

Third quarter

- PSU – Nick Bowers, 10-yard TD pass from Clifford, 2-point conversion run failed, 4:05 (UM 24–19)

Fourth quarter

- UM – Seth Green, 1-yard TD run, Walker kick good, 14:11 (UM 31–19)
- PSU – J. Brown, 6-yard TD run, Pinegar kick good, 3:49 (UM 31–26)

Top passers

- PSU – Sean Clifford – 18/43, 340 yards, TD, 3 INT
- UM – Tanner Morgan – 18/20, 339 yards, 3 TD

Top rushers

- PSU – Journey Brown – 14 carries, 124 yards, 2 TD
- UM – Rodney Smith – 18 carries, 51 yards

Top receivers

- PSU – K. J. Hamler – 7 receptions, 119 yards
- UM – Rashod Bateman – 7 receptions, 203 yards, TD

Top defenders

- PSU – Micah Parsons – 11 tackles, 2 tackles-for-loss (TFL), 1 sack
- UM – Antoine Winfield Jr. – 11 tackles, 2 INT

=== No. 24^{AP} Indiana ===
Indiana vs. Penn State – Game summary

Quarter	1	2	3	4	Total
No. 24^{AP} Indiana	14	0	3	10	27
No. 9^{AP/CFP} Penn State	17	3	7	7	34

at Beaver Stadium, University Park, Pennsylvania

- Date: November 16
- Game time: 12:00 p.m. ET
- Game weather: 35 °F (2 °C); sunny, chilly
- Game attendance: 106,323
- Referee: Jeff Servinski
- TV announcers (ABC): Jason Benetti, Rod Gilmore, Quint Kessenich
- ESPN Box Score, GoPSUsports.com

Game information

First quarter

- PSU – Nick Bowers, 12-yard TD pass from Sean Clifford, Jake Pinegar kick good, 12:04 (PSU 7–0)
- IU – Ty Fryfogle, 38-yard TD pass from Peyton Ramsey, Logan Justus kick good, 9:31 (TIE 7–7)
- PSU – Pinegar, 47-yard field goal, 6:22 (PSU 10–7)
- IU – Ramsey, 1-yard TD run, Justus kick good, 3:27 (IU 14–10)
- PSU – Clifford, 38-yard TD run, Pinegar kick good, 1:03 (PSU 17–14)

Second quarter

- PSU – Pinegar, 27-yard field goal, 3:03 (PSU 20–14)

Third quarter

- PSU – Journey Brown, 35-yard TD run, Pinegar kick good, 10:24 (PSU 27–14)
- IU – Justus, 25-yard field goal, 3:04 (PSU 27–17)

Fourth quarter

- IU – Ramsey, 1-yard TD run, Justus kick good, 10:45 (PSU 27–24)
- PSU – Clifford, 1-yard TD run, Pinegar kick good, 1:44 (PSU 34–24)
- IU – Justus, 27-yard field goal, 0:13 (PSU 34–27)

Top passers

- IU – Peyton Ramsey – 31/41, 371 yards, TD
- PSU – Sean Clifford – 11/23, 179 yards, TD

Top rushers

- IU – Stevie Scott III – 17 carries, 54 yards
- PSU – Journey Brown – 21 carries, 100 yards, TD

Top receivers

- IU – Ty Fryfogle – 5 receptions, 131 yards, TD
- PSU – K. J. Hamler – 2 receptions, 52 yards

Top defenders

- IU – Khalil Bryant – 10 tackles
- PSU – Tariq Castro-Fields – 8 tackles

=== At No. 2^{AP/CFP} Ohio State ===
Penn State at Ohio State – Game summary

Quarter	1	2	3	4	Total
No. 9^{AP}/8^{CFP} Penn State	0	0	17	0	17
No. 2^{AP/CFP} Ohio State	7	7	7	7	28

at Ohio Stadium, Columbus, OH

- Date: November 23
- Game time: 12:00 p.m. ET
- Game weather: 42 °F (6 °C); mostly cloudy
- Game attendance: 104,355
- Referee: Michael Cannon
- TV announcers (FOX): Gus Johnson, Joel Klatt, Jenny Taft
- ESPN Box Score, GoPSUsports.com

Game information

First quarter

- OSU – J. K. Dobbins, 4-yard TD run, Blake Haubeil kick good, 7:08 (OSU 7–0)

Second quarter

- OSU – Dobbins, 1-yard TD run, Haubeil kick good, 2:00 (OSU 14–0)

Third quarter

- OSU – K. J. Hill, 24-yard TD pass from Justin Fields, Haubeil kick good, 11:31 (OSU 21–0)
- PSU – Journey Brown, 18-yard TD run, Jake Pinegar kick good, 8:19 (OSU 21–7)
- PSU – Will Levis, 1-yard TD run, Pinegar kick good, 7:54 (OSU 21–14)
- PSU – Pinegar, 42-yard field goal, 4:22 (OSU 21–17)

Fourth quarter

- OSU – Chris Olave, 28-yard TD pass from Fields, Haubeil kick good, 13:18 (OSU 28–17)

Top passers

- PSU – Sean Clifford – 10/17, 71 yards
- OSU – Justin Fields – 16/22, 188 yards, 2 TD

Top rushers

- PSU – Journey Brown – 11 carries, 64 yards, TD
- OSU – J. K. Dobbins – 36 carries, 157 yards, 2 TD

Top receivers

- PSU – K. J. Hamler – 3 receptions, 45 yards
- OSU – K. J. Hill – 4 receptions, 46 yards, TD

Top defenders

- PSU – Garrett Taylor – 13 tackles, 0.5 tackles-for-loss (TFL)
- OSU – Pete Werner – 10 tackles

=== Rutgers ===
Rutgers vs. Penn State – Game summary

Quarter	1	2	3	4	Total
Rutgers	3	0	0	3	6
No. 12^{AP}/10^{CFP} Penn State	7	0	6	14	27

at Beaver Stadium, University Park, Pennsylvania

- Date: November 30
- Game time: 3:30 p.m. ET
- Game weather: 37 °F (3 °C); partly cloudy
- Game attendance: 98,895
- Referee: Jerry McGinn
- TV announcers (BTN): Brandon Gaudin, James Laurinaitis, Elise Menaker
- ESPN Box Score, GoPSUsports.com

Game information

First quarter

- RU – Justin Davidovicz, 29-yard field goal, 3:32 (RU 3–0)
- PSU – Journey Brown, 2-yard TD run, Jake Pinegar kick good, 0:06 (PSU 7–3)

Second quarter

No scoring

Third quarter

- PSU – J. Brown, 18-yard TD run, Pinegar kick blocked, 12:05 (PSU 13–3)

Fourth quarter

- RU – Davidovicz, 38-yard field goal, 14:55 (PSU 13–6)
- PSU – Jahan Dotson, 44-yard TD pass from Will Levis, Pinegar kick good, 12:16 (PSU 20–6)
- PSU – J. Brown, 1-yard TD run, Pinegar kick blocked, 5:13 (PSU 27–6)

Top passers

- RU – Johnny Langan – 12/24, 164 yards
- PSU – Will Levis – 8/14, 81 yards, TD, INT

Top rushers

- RU – Isiah Pacheco – 18 carries, 102 yards
- PSU – Will Levis – 17 carries, 108 yards

Top receivers

- RU – Isaiah Washington – 4 receptions, 63 yards
- PSU – Jahan Dotson – 1 reception, 44 yards, TD

Top defenders

- RU – Christian Izien – 8 tackles
- PSU – Micah Parsons – 10 tackles, 1 tackle-for-loss (TFL), 1 sack

=== vs. No. 15^{AP}/17^{CFP} Memphis (Cotton Bowl) ===
Memphis vs. Penn State – Game summary

Quarter	1	2	3	4	Total
No. 15^{AP}/17^{CFP} Memphis	13	10	13	3	39
No. 13^{AP}/10^{CFP} Penn State	7	28	10	8	53

at AT&T Stadium, Arlington, Texas

- Date: December 28
- Game time: 12:00 p.m. ET
- Game weather: indoors, roof closed
- Game attendance: 54,828
- Referee: Jeff Flanagan
- TV announcers (ESPN): Mark Jones, Dusty Dvoracek, Olivia Dekker
- ESPN Box Score, GoPSUsports.com

Game information

First quarter

- UM – Riley Patterson, 48-yard field goal, 10:52 (UM 3–0)
- PSU – Journey Brown, 32-yard TD run, Jake Pinegar kick good, 9:56 (PSU 7–3)
- UM – Patrick Taylor Jr, 3-yard TD run, Patterson kick good, 7:44 (UM 10–7)
- UM – Patterson, 37-yard field goal, 2:55 (UM 13–7)

Second quarter

- PSU – Noah Cain, 1-yard TD run, Pinegar kick good, 11:14 (PSU 14–13)
- PSU – Devyn Ford, 2-yard TD run, Pinegar kick good, 7:47 (PSU 21–13)
- PSU – J. Brown, 56-yard TD run, Pinegar kick good, 5:51 (PSU 28–13)
- UM – Kenneth Gainwell, 2-yard TD run, Patterson kick good, 3:15 (PSU 28–20)
- PSU – Jahan Dotson, 4-yard TD pass from Sean Clifford, Pinegar kick good, 0:51 (PSU 35–20)
- UM – Patterson, 44-yard field goal, 0:00 (PSU 35–23)

Third quarter

- UM – Brady White, 1-yard TD run, Patterson kick good, 12:16 (PSU 35–30)
- UM – Patterson, 51-yard field goal, 10:24 (PSU 35–33)
- PSU – Pinegar, 45-yard field goal, 7:13 (PSU 38–33)
- UM – Patterson, 41-yard field goal, 3:32 (PSU 38–36)
- PSU – Garrett Taylor, 15-yard interception return for TD, Pinegar kick good, 0:38 (PSU 45–36)

Fourth quarter

- UM – Patterson, 42-yard field goal, 12:01 (PSU 45–39)
- PSU – Noah Cain, 1-yard TD run, 2-point conversion pass to Pat Freiermuth from Clifford, 6:31 (PSU 53–39)

Top passers

- UM – Brady White – 32/51, 454 yards, 2 INT
- PSU – Sean Clifford – 11/20, 133 yards, TD, INT

Top rushers

- UM – Patrick Taylor – 8 carries, 50 yards, TD
- PSU – Journey Brown – 16 carries, 202 yards, 2 TD

Top receivers

- UM – Damonte Coxie – 8 receptions, 132 yards
- PSU – K. J. Hamler – 2 receptions, 46 yards

Top defenders

- UM – Sanchez Blake – 13 tackles
- PSU – Micah Parsons – 14 tackles, 3 TFL (tackles-for-loss), 2 sacks

== Rankings ==
Ranking movements Legend: ██ Increase in ranking ██ Decrease in ranking т = Tied with team above or below
	Week																
Poll	Pre	1	2	3	4	5	6	7	8	9	10	11	12	13	14	15	Final
AP	15	15	13	13-T	12	12	10	7	6	5	5	9	9	12	12	13	9
Coaches	14	14	11	12	11	11	9	7	6	5	5	11	9	12	11	12	9
CFP	Not released										4	9	8	10	10	10	Not released

== Personnel ==
=== Coaching staff ===
Penn State football current coaching staff
Name	Position	Alma Mater	Years at Penn State
James Franklin	Head Coach	East Stroudsburg University (1995)	6th
Brent Pry	Defensive coordinator/linebackers	University at Buffalo (1993)	6th
Ricky Rahne	Offensive coordinator/quarterbacks coach	Cornell University (2002)	6th
Tim Banks	Co-defensive coordinator/safeties	Central Michigan University (1995)	4th
Tyler Bowen	Off. Recruiting coordinator/tight ends	University of Maryland (2010)	2nd
Matt Limegrover	Run Game Coordinator/offensive line	University of Chicago (1991)	4th
Sean Spencer	Associate head coach/Run Game Coord./defensive line	Clarion University (1995)	6th
Gerad Parker	Wide receivers	University of Kentucky (2003)	1st
Ja'Juan Seider	Running backs	West Virginia University (2000)	2nd
Terry Smith	Assistant head coach/defensive recruiting coordinator/cornerbacks	Penn State University (1991)	6th
Joe Lorig	Special teams coordinator/defensive Assistant	Western Oregon University (1995)	1st
Dwight Galt III	Assistant AD, Performance Enhancement	University of Maryland (1981)	6th
V'Angelo Bentley	Graduate Assistant	University of Illinois (2015)	1st
Kevin Smith	Graduate Assistant	Urbana University (2014)	3rd
Kevin Reihner	Graduate Assistant	Stanford University (2015)	1st
Mark Dupuis	Graduate Assistant	University of Connecticut (2011)	3rd

=== Roster ===
2019 Penn State Nittany Lions football roster
Quarterback: 7 Will Levis – (redshirt) freshman (6'3, 229); 9 Ta'Quan Roberson – freshman (5'11, 192); 13 Michael Johnson Jr. – freshman (6'2, 199); 14 Sean Clifford – (redshirt) sophomore (6'2, 216); 15 Michael Shuster – (redshirt) junior (6'2, 210); 19 Isaac Rumery – freshman (5'11, 203); Running back: 3 Ricky Slade – sophomore (5'9, 198); 4 Journey Brown – (redshirt) sophomore (5'11, 206); 21 Noah Cain – freshman (5'10, 206); 28 Devyn Ford – freshman (5'11, 194); 40 Nick Eury – (redshirt) junior (5'9, 212); Wide receiver: 1 K. J. Hamler – (redshirt) sophomore (5'9, 176); 5 Jahan Dotson – sophomore (5'11, 175); 6 Justin Shorter – (redshirt) freshman (6'4, 235); 8 John Dunmore – freshman (6'1, 179); 10 TJ Jones – freshman (6'1, 196); 11 Daniel George – (redshirt) freshman (6'2, 220); 12 Mac Hippenhammer – (redshirt) sophomore (5'11, 182); 23 Weston Carr – (redshirt) senior (6'2, 202); 29 Henry Fessler – (redshirt) freshman (5'10, 172); 44 Cameron Pica – (redshirt) sophomore (6'2, 215); 80 Justin Weller – (redshirt) sophomore (6'0, 190); 81 Cam Sullivan-Brown – (redshirt) sophomore (6'0, 194); 83 Alex Hoenstine – (redshirt) sophomore (6'1, 190); 84 Benjamin Wilson – (redshirt) junior (6'2, 204); 85 Isaac Lutz – (redshirt) junior (5'11, 193); 86 Alec Berger – (redshirt) sophomore (5'11, 175); 88 Dan Chisena – (redshirt) senior (6'3, 202); 89 Colton Maxwell – (redshirt) junior (6'0, 194); Tight end: 17 Grayson Kline – (redshirt) freshman (6'5, 239); 43 Trevor Baker – (redshirt) sophomore (6'3, 227); 82 Zack Kuntz – (redshirt) freshman (6'7, 243); 83 Nick Bowers – (redshirt) senior (6'4, 260); 86 Brenton Strange – freshman (6'3, 233); 87 Pat Freiermuth – sophomore (6'5, 256); Placekicker: 90 Rafael Checa – sophomore (6'2, 201); 92 Jake Pinegar – sophomore (6'2, 195); 95 Vlad Hilling – (redshirt) freshman (5'10, 226); 97 Sebastian Costantini – freshman (5'11, 195); 98 Jordan Stout – (redshirt) sophomore (6'3, 205); 99 Justin Tobin – (redshirt) junior (6'2, 208)	Offensive lineman: 50 Will Knutsson – (redshirt) freshman (6'2, 296); 53 Rasheed Walker – (redshirt) freshman (6'6, 324); 55 Anthony Whigan – junior (6'4, 301); 59 Kaleb Konigus – (redshirt) freshman (6'2, 302); 62 Michal Menet – (redshirt) junior (6'4, 313); 63 Collin De Boef – (redshirt) freshman (6'5, 258); 68 Hunter Kelly – (redshirt) junior (6'2, 309); 69 C.J. Thorpe – (redshirt) sophomore (6'3, 322); 70 Juice Scruggs – (redshirt) freshman (6'3, 285); 71 Will Fries – (redshirt) junior (6'6, 313); 72 Bryce Effner – (redshirt) freshman (6'5, 297); 73 Mike Miranda – (redshirt) sophomore (6'3, 295); 74 Steven Gonzalez – (redshirt) senior (6'4, 341); 75 Des Holmes – (redshirt) sophomore (6'5, 315); 77 Sal Wormley – freshman (6'3, 319); 79 Caedan Wallace – freshman (6'5, 333); Defensive lineman: 18 Shaka Toney – DE – (redshirt) junior (6'3, 243); 20 Adisa Isaac – DE – freshman (6'4, 241); 27 Aeneas Hawkins – DT – (redshirt) freshman (6'2, 272); 28 Odafe Oweh – DE – (redshirt) freshman (6'5, 255); 34 Shane Simmons – DE – (redshirt) junior (6'3, 259); 42 Ellison Jordan – DT – (redshirt) junior (6'0, 320); 44 Joseph Darkwa – DT – freshman (6'5, 272); 46 Nick Tarburton – DE – (redshirt) freshman (6'3, 263); 49 Daniel Joseph – DE – (redshirt) junior (6'3, 260); 51 Hakeem Beamon – DE – freshman (6'3, 259); 53 Fred Hansard – DT – (redshirt) sophomore (6'3, 316); 54 Robert Windsor – DT – (redshirt) senior (6'4, 285); 55 Antonio Shelton – DT – (redshirt) junior (6'2, 311); 58 Evan Presta – DT – (redshirt) sophomore (6'3, 288); 88 Judge Culpepper – DT – (redshirt) freshman (6'4, 284); 90 Damion Barber – DT – (redshirt) sophomore (6'3, 290); 91 Dvon Ellies – DT – freshman (6'1, 304); 92 Smith Vilbert – DE – freshman (6'6, 253); 93 P. J. Mustipher – DT – sophomore (6'4, 311); 98 Dan Vasey – DE – (redshirt) sophomore (6'4, 252); 99 Yetur Gross-Matos – DE – junior (6'5, 264); Punter: 49 Cade Pollard – (redshirt) freshman (5'11, 225); 93 Blake Gillikin – senior (6'2, 196); 97 Carson Landis – (redshirt) sophomore (6'2, 205)	Linebacker: 6 Cam Brown – senior (6'5, 233); 10 Lance Dixon – freshman (6'2, 213); 11 Micah Parsons – sophomore (6'3, 245); 12 Brandon Smith – freshman (6'3, 240); 13 Ellis Brooks – (redshirt) sophomore (6'1, 234); 36 Jan Johnson – (redshirt) senior (6'2, 231); 39 Robbie Dwyer – freshman (6'1, 235); 40 Jesse Luketa – sophomore (6'3, 247); 45 Charlie Katshir – (redshirt) freshman (6'3, 229); 50 Max Chizmar – (redshirt) sophomore (6'2, 230); Defensive back: 2 Keaton Ellis – CB – freshman (5'11, 190); 3 Donovan Johnson – CB – (redshirt) sophomore (5'9, 185); 5 Tariq Castro-Fields – CB – junior (6'0, 197); 7 Jaquan Brisker – S – junior (6'1, 210); 8 Marquis Wilson – CB – freshman (5'11, 173); 9 Joey Porter Jr. – CB – freshman (6'2, 180); 16 John Petrishen – S – (redshirt) senior (6'0, 211); 17 Garrett Taylor – S – (redshirt) senior (6'0, 198); 19 Trent Gordon – CB – (redshirt) freshman (5'11, 188); 21 Tyler Rudolph – S – freshman (6'0, 204); 24 DJ Brown – CB – (redshirt) sophomore (5'10, 183); 25 Daequan Hardy – CB – freshman (5'9, 170); 26 Jonathan Sutherland – S – (redshirt) sophomore (5'11, 201); 27 Cody Romano– S – (redshirt) freshman (6'2, 209); 29 John Reid – CB – (redshirt) senior (5'10, 181); 35 Justin Neff – S – (redshirt) sophomore (6'1, 195); 36 Makai Self – CB – freshman (5'9, 167); 37 Drew Hartlaub – S – (redshirt) sophomore (5'11, 183); 38 Lamont Wade – S – junior (5'9, 199); 48 C.J. Holmes – S – (redshirt) sophomore (6'0, 216); Long snappers: 91 Chris Stoll – (redshirt) sophomore (6'2, 245); 94 Joe Calcagno – (redshirt) sophomore (6'0, 279)

== Players drafted into the NFL ==
Round	Pick	Player	Position	NFL club
2	38	Yetur Gross-Matos	DE	Carolina Panthers
2	46	K. J. Hamler	WR	Denver Broncos
4	141	John Reid	CB	Houston Texans
6	183	Cam Brown	OLB	New York Giants
6	193	Robert Windsor	DT	Indianapolis Colts
