= Jesse Luketa =

Canadian gridiron football player (born 1999)

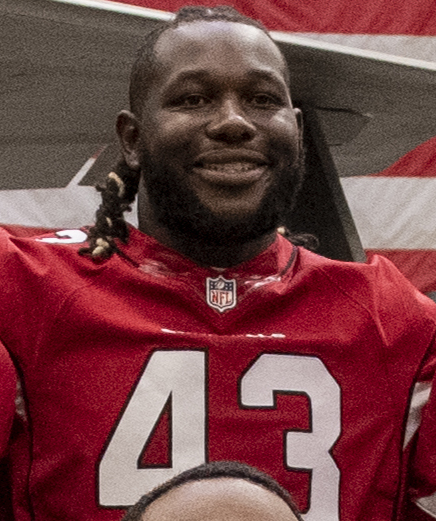
- Luketa with the Arizona Cardinals in 2022

Profile
- Position: Outside linebacker

Personal information
- Born: January 15, 1999 (age 27); Edmonton, Alberta, Canada
- Listed height: 6 ft 3 in (1.91 m)
- Listed weight: 260 lb (118 kg)

Career information
- High school: Mercyhurst Preparatory (Erie, Pennsylvania, U.S.)
- College: Penn State (2018–2021)
- NFL draft: 2022: 7th round, 256th overall pick
- CFL draft: 2022: 2nd round, 20th overall pick

Career history
- Arizona Cardinals (2022–2025); Los Angeles Rams (2025)*; New England Patriots (2026)*
- * Offseason or practice squad member only

Awards and highlights
- Third-team All-Big Ten (2021)

Career NFL statistics as of 2025
- Total tackles: 35
- Sacks: 3
- Forced fumbles: 1
- Stats at Pro Football Reference

Jesse Shimbi Luketa (born January 15, 1999) is a Canadian professional football outside linebacker. He played college football for the Penn State Nittany Lions.

== Early life ==
Luketa was born in Edmonton, Alberta, and grew up in Ottawa's Heron Gate neighborhood. He was raised in a single parent household by his mother, who immigrated to Canada from the Democratic Republic of the Congo. When Luketa was 14 years old, he enrolled at Mercyhurst Preparatory School in Erie, Pennsylvania, for his final three years of high school. Luketa was rated a four-star recruit and committed to play college football at Penn State from over 40 scholarship offers.

== College career ==
Luketa played mostly on special teams during his freshman season. He saw more significant playing time as a sophomore, and made 24 tackles with four passes broken up. Luketa was selected as a team captain going into his junior year and finished the season second on the team with 59 tackles along with 2.5 tackles for loss, a fumble recovery and three passes broken up. Luketa played both linebacker and defensive end as a senior, and was named to the third-team All-Big Ten Conference. Following the end of the season, he declared that he would be entering the 2022 NFL draft.

=== College statistics ===
Season	Team	GP	Comb	Solo	Ast	Sck	Int	FF
2018	Penn State	5	7	5	2	0	0	0
2019	Penn State	12	24	15	9	0	0	0
2020	Penn State	9	59	31	28	0	0	0
2021	Penn State	12	61	34	27	0.5	1	0
Total		38	148	82	66	0.5	1	0

== Professional career ==
Pre-draft measurables
Height	Weight	Arm length	Hand span	Wingspan	40-yard dash	10-yard split	20-yard split	20-yard shuttle	Three-cone drill	Vertical jump	Broad jump	Bench press
6 ft 2 7/8 in (1.90 m)	253 lb (115 kg)	32 5/8 in (0.83 m)	10 3/8 in (0.26 m)	6 ft 6 3/4 in (2.00 m)	4.89 s	1.68 s	2.82 s	4.27 s	7.29 s	37.5 in (0.95 m)	10 ft 0 in (3.05 m)	17 reps
All values from NFL Combine/Pro Day

=== Arizona Cardinals ===
Luketa was selected in the final round (256th overall) of the 2022 NFL draft by the Arizona Cardinals. He was ranked as the #2 Canadian prospect ahead of the 2022 CFL draft, where he was drafted in the second round (20th overall) by the Ottawa Redblacks as a territorial draft pick. He was waived by the Cardinals on August 30, 2022, and signed to the practice squad the next day. He was promoted to the active roster on September 27.

Following Week 16 of the 2022 NFL season, Luketa underwent dental surgery; upon learning about teammate J. J. Watt's retirement announcement, Luketa attempted to contact Watt (who was unaware that it was Luketa contacting him). Luketa, with cottonballs and slurred speech after surgery, sent a photo and voice memo to Watt requesting a signed jersey at the end of the season; both later joked about in the press.

In Week 5 of the 2024 NFL season, Luketa recorded the first forced fumble of his career in a win against the San Francisco 49ers as the Cardinals won 24–23.

=== Los Angeles Rams ===
On November 18, 2025, Luketa signed with the Los Angeles Rams' practice squad.

=== New England Patriots ===
On March 5, 2026, Luketa signed a reserve/futures contract with the New England Patriots. On August 30, Luketa was released by the Patriots as a part of final roster cuts.
