= John Reid (American football) =

American football player (born 1996)

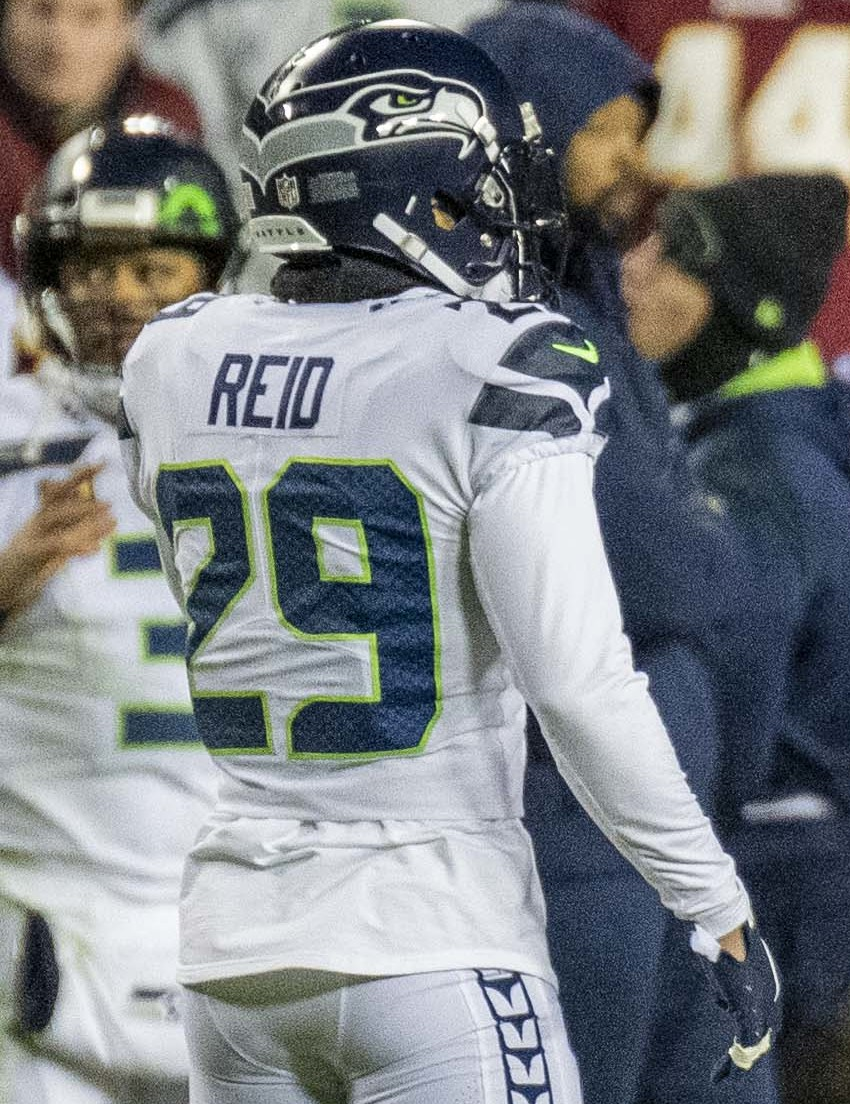
- Reid with the Seattle Seahawks in 2021

Profile
- Position: Cornerback

Personal information
- Born: May 15, 1996 (age 30); Mount Laurel, New Jersey, U.S.
- Listed height: 5 ft 10 in (1.78 m)
- Listed weight: 187 lb (85 kg)

Career information
- High school: St. Joseph's Preparatory School
- College: Penn State (2015–2019)
- NFL draft: 2020: 4th round, 141st overall pick

Career history
- Houston Texans (2020); Seattle Seahawks (2021–2022); Atlanta Falcons (2022)*; Tennessee Titans (2022); Atlanta Falcons (2022)*; Minnesota Vikings (2023)*
- * Offseason or practice squad member only

Career NFL statistics
- Total tackles: 30
- Pass deflections: 3
- Stats at Pro Football Reference

John Earl Reid (born May 15, 1996) is an American professional football cornerback. He played college football at Penn State.

== Early life ==
A native of Mount Laurel, New Jersey, he played high school football at St. Joseph's Prep in Philadelphia where he was a three-year starter.

== College career ==
Reid attended the Pennsylvania State University. He started two games as a true freshman and played in 13 games, earning ESPN.com's Big Ten Conference All-Freshman team honors. He started all 14 games in 2016 as a sophomore, helping Penn State win a Big Ten Championship and make a trip to the Rose Bowl. Reid redshirted the 2017 season due to a knee injury. He started 24 games in his final two years as a Nittany Lion. He finished third on the team with 72 tackles as a senior. In his career, Reid had 125 total tackles and seven interceptions. He was a three-time Big Ten Honorable Mention. Aside from football, Reid majored in electrical engineering and computer science, where he had internships at Intel and Blizzard Entertainment.

== Professional career ==
Pre-draft measurables
Height	Weight	Arm length	Hand span	Wingspan	40-yard dash	10-yard split	20-yard split	20-yard shuttle	Three-cone drill	Vertical jump	Broad jump	Bench press
5 ft 10 3/8 in (1.79 m)	187 lb (85 kg)	30 1/8 in (0.77 m)	9 1/8 in (0.23 m)	6 ft 1 1/8 in (1.86 m)	4.49 s	1.52 s	2.63 s	3.97 s	6.95 s	36.5 in (0.93 m)	10 ft 9 in (3.28 m)	20 reps
All values from NFL Combine

=== Houston Texans ===
Reid was selected by the Houston Texans in the fourth round with the 141st pick of the 2020 NFL draft.

=== Seattle Seahawks ===
On August 24, 2021, the Texans traded Reid to the Seattle Seahawks for a 2022 seventh round draft pick. He was waived on August 31, 2021, re-signed to the practice squad the next day and one week later joined the 53-man roster. He was released on October 12, 2022, after beginning the season on injured reserve.

=== Atlanta Falcons (first stint) ===
On November 22, 2022, Reid signed with the practice squad of the Atlanta Falcons.

=== Tennessee Titans ===
On December 7, 2022, Reid was signed by the Tennessee Titans off the Falcons practice squad. He was waived on December 30.

=== Atlanta Falcons (second stint) ===
On January 3, 2023, Reid was signed to the Falcons' practice squad. He signed a reserve/future contract on January 9. He was released on May 3.

=== Minnesota Vikings ===
On May 4, 2023, Reid was claimed off waivers by the Minnesota Vikings. He was waived on July 19, 2023.
