= Joe Lorig =

American football player and coach (born 1973)

Current position
- Title: Special Teams Coordinator
- Team: Oregon
- Conference: Big Ten

Biographical details
- Born: June 21, 1973 (age 53); Edmonds, Washington
- Education: Western Oregon University

Playing career
- 1991–1993: Walla Walla
- 1994–1995: Western Oregon
- Position: Cornerback

Coaching career (HC unless noted)
- 1997–1998: Western Oregon (DB)
- 1999–2000: Idaho State (CB)
- 2001–2002: Idaho State (LB)
- 2003–2006: Idaho State (DC)
- 2007: UTEP (LB)
- 2008–2011: Central Washington (AHC/DC)
- 2012–2013: Arizona State (STC/CB)
- 2014–2015: Utah State (LB/S)
- 2016–2018: Memphis (STC/OLB)
- 2019–2021: Penn State (STC/OLB)
- 2022–present: Oregon (STC/Nickels)

Joe Lorig (born June 21, 1973), is an American football coach who is currently the special teams coordinator for the Oregon Ducks. Lorig played college football for the Western Oregon Wolves.

== Coaching career ==
=== Early Coaching Career ===
After two years coaching defensive backs at Western Oregon, Lorig would spend the next eight seasons filling a variety of roles for Idaho State and head coach Larry Lewis. During the 1999 season, Lorig served with wide receivers coach James Franklin. He then spent a season at UTEP, followed by three at Central Washington.

=== Arizona State ===
Lorig spent two seasons at Arizona State in 2012-2013, where he served as the special teams coordinator and cornerbacks coach.

=== Utah State ===
Lorig spent 2014 and 2015 as the linebackers and safeties coach for Utah State.

=== Memphis ===
Lorig spent three seasons at Memphis serving under head coach Mike Norvell as their special teams coordinator and outside linebackers coach. During his time as the special teams coordinator, Memphis finished in the Top 5 in kickoff return average twice and in the top 20 in kickoff-return defense every year. Memphis ranked second in return defense in 2016. Under Lorig's coaching Tony Pollard tied an NCAA record with seven career kickoff returns for touchdowns. In 2016, Memphis returned three kickoffs for touchdowns, breaking a 21-year scoreless drought. In addition, Lorig's special teams units did not allow a kickoff or punt return for a touchdown during his time at Memphis.

=== Penn State ===
On January 8, 2019, it was announced that Lorig would join Texas Tech and head coach Matt Wells as the special teams coordinator and defensive assistant. However on February 21, 2019, he went to Penn State as special teams coordinator and defensive assistant, replacing Phil Galiano.

=== Oregon ===
On December 30, 2021, it was reported that Lorig would be joining Dan Lanning's inaugural Oregon staff. The two previously worked together at Memphis and Arizona State.
