= Smith Vilbert =

American football player (born 2001)

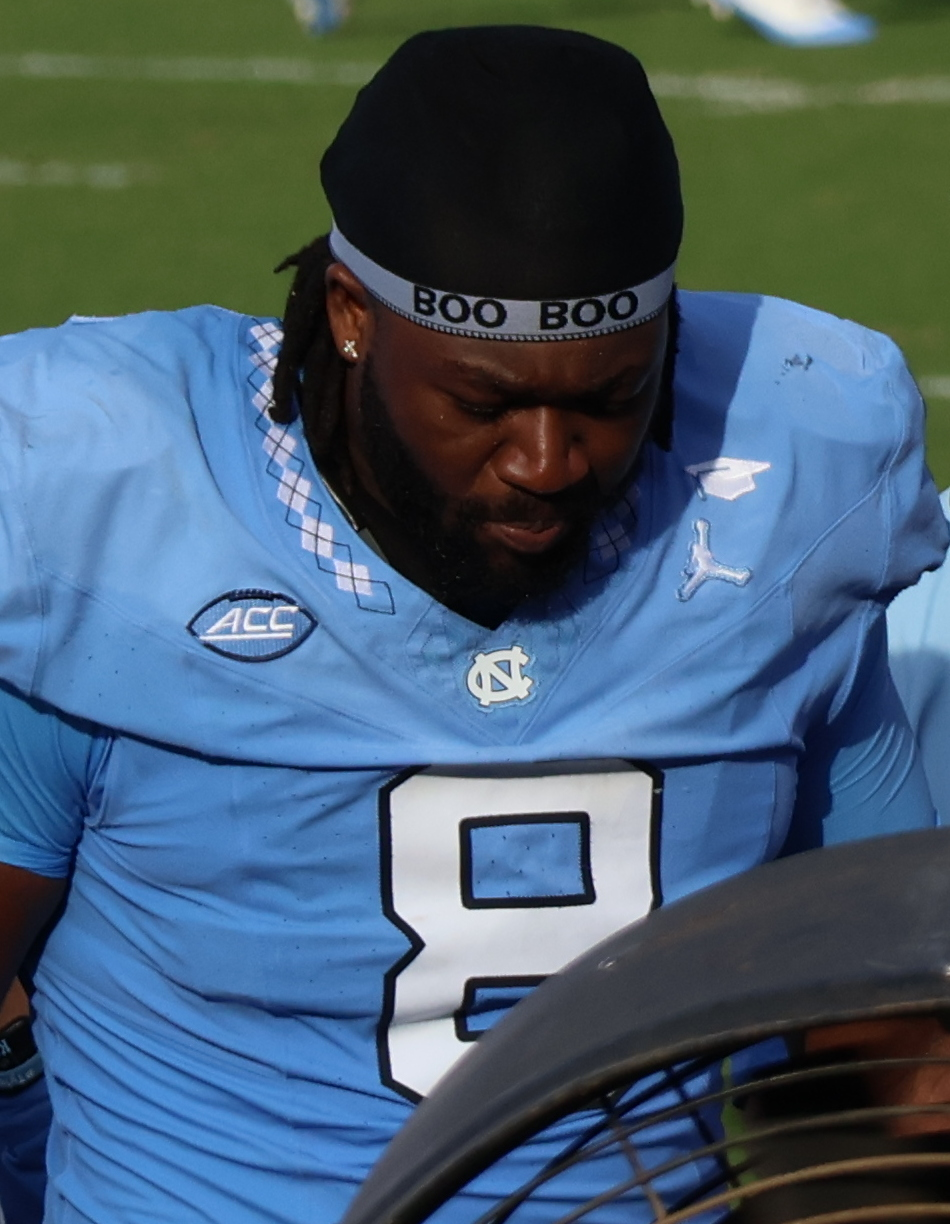
- Vilbert in 2025

Profile
- Position: Defensive end

Personal information
- Born: May 11, 2001 (age 25); Haiti
- Listed height: 6 ft 6 in (1.98 m)
- Listed weight: 288 lb (131 kg)

Career information
- High school: Saint Joseph Regional (Montvale, New Jersey)
- College: Penn State (2019–2024); North Carolina (2025)
- NFL draft: 2026: undrafted

Career history
- Minnesota Vikings (2026)*
- * Offseason or practice squad member only

Smith Sonder Vilbert (born May 11, 2001) is a Haitian American football defensive end. He played college football for the Penn State Nittany Lions and for the North Carolina Tar Heels.

== Early life ==
Vilbert was born in Haiti, where he lived until he moved to the United States as a young child. He attended Saint Joseph Regional High School located in Montvale, New Jersey, where he helped lead his team to a State Title. He was rated as a three-star recruit and the 49th overall defensive end by 247Sports, and committed to play college football for the Penn State Nittany Lions over Florida.

== College career ==
=== Penn State ===
As a freshman in 2019, Vilbert was redshirted. In 2020, he played in four games. In the 2022 Outback Bowl, Vilbert recorded three sacks against Arkansas. He finished the 2021 season with seven tackles with four being for a loss, and three sacks. Vilbert missed the entirety of the 2022 and 2023 seasons with injuries. He returned in 2024, where he notched 12 tackles with four being for a loss, a sack and a half, two forced fumbles, and a fumble recovery, after which he entered the NCAA transfer portal.

=== North Carolina ===
Vilbert transferred to play for the North Carolina Tar Heels. In 2025, he tallied a career-best 22 tackles with six going for a loss, a sack, and a forced fumble.

== Professional career ==
Pre-draft measurables
Height	Weight	Arm length	Hand span	Wingspan	40-yard dash	10-yard split	20-yard split	20-yard shuttle	Three-cone drill	Vertical jump	Broad jump	Bench press
6 ft 5 3/4 in (1.97 m)	290 lb (132 kg)	34 1/4 in (0.87 m)	10 1/8 in (0.26 m)	6 ft 11 1/8 in (2.11 m)	5.11 s	1.71 s	2.92 s	4.69 s	7.74 s	29.5 in (0.75 m)	9 ft 6 in (2.90 m)	19 reps
All values from Pro Day

After not being selected in the 2026 NFL draft, Vilbert signed with the Minnesota Vikings as an undrafted free agent on May 8, 2026. On August 30, he was waived by the Vikings as part of the final roster cuts.
