= Tariq Castro-Fields =

American football player (born 1999)

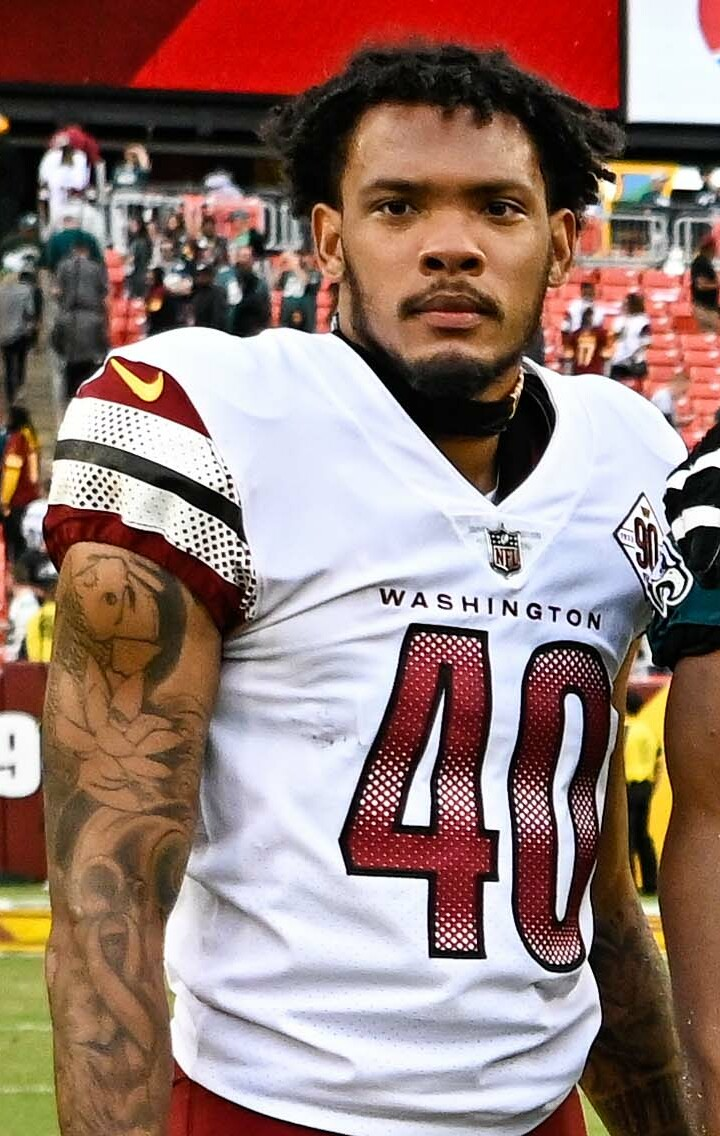
- Castro-Fields with the Washington Commanders in 2022

Profile
- Position: Cornerback

Personal information
- Born: January 14, 1999 (age 27); Alexandria, Virginia, U.S.
- Listed height: 6 ft 1 in (1.85 m)
- Listed weight: 197 lb (89 kg)

Career information
- High school: Riverdale Baptist (Upper Marlboro, Maryland)
- College: Penn State (2017–2021)
- NFL draft: 2022: 6th round, 221st overall pick

Career history
- San Francisco 49ers (2022)*; Washington Commanders (2022–2023); Carolina Panthers (2024); Philadelphia Eagles (2024–2026)*
- * Offseason or practice squad member only

Awards and highlights
- Super Bowl champion (LIX); Third-team All-Big Ten (2019)

Career NFL statistics as of 2025
- Total tackles: 4
- Stats at Pro Football Reference

Tariq Quinton Castro-Fields (born January 14, 1999) is an American professional football cornerback. He was rated a four-star recruit and played college football for the Penn State Nittany Lions after considering offers from Maryland and Alabama. He was selected by the San Francisco 49ers in the sixth round of the 2022 NFL draft. Castro-Fields has also played for the Washington Commanders, Carolina Panthers, and Philadelphia Eagles.

== Early life ==
Castro-Fields was born on January 14, 1999, in Alexandria, Virginia, to a mother of Filipino descent and a father of African American descent. He grew up in Upper Marlboro, Maryland, and attended the Riverdale Baptist School.

== College career ==
Castro-Fields played in 12 games as a freshman and finished the season with 10 total tackles, three passes broken up, and one interception. As a junior, Castro-Fields had 52 tackles and led the team with two interceptions and eight passes broken up. He played in three games during Penn State's COVID-19-shortened 2020 season, missing the rest due to injury. Castro-Fields decided to utilize the extra year of eligibility granted to college athletes who played in the 2020 season due to the COVID-19 pandemic and return to Penn State for a fifth season.

== Professional career ==
Pre-draft measurables
Height	Weight	Arm length	Hand span	Wingspan	40-yard dash	10-yard split	20-yard split	20-yard shuttle	Three-cone drill	Vertical jump	Broad jump	Bench press
6 ft 0 5/8 in (1.84 m)	197 lb (89 kg)	30 3/4 in (0.78 m)	8 3/4 in (0.22 m)	6 ft 4 in (1.93 m)	4.38 s	1.50 s	2.56 s	4.06 s	7.05 s	37.0 in (0.94 m)	10 ft 11 in (3.33 m)	14 reps
All values from NFL Combine/Pro Day

=== San Francisco 49ers ===
Castro-Fields was selected in the sixth round of the 2022 NFL draft by the San Francisco 49ers. He was waived on August 30, 2022.

=== Washington Commanders ===
On August 31, 2022, Castro-Fields was claimed by the Washington Commanders. He was placed on injured reserve on October 21. On August 29, 2023, Castro-Fields was waived by the Commanders and re-signed to the practice squad. He was promoted to the active roster on November 3. On August 27, 2024, Castro-Fields was waived as part of final roster cuts before the start of the 2024 season.

=== Carolina Panthers ===
On August 28, 2024, Castro-Fields was claimed off waivers by the Carolina Panthers. He was waived on October 1.

=== Philadelphia Eagles ===
On October 21, 2024, Castro-Fields was signed to the Philadelphia Eagles' practice squad. He was released on December 26. On December 31, the Eagles re-signed Castro-Fields to their practice squad. He won a Super Bowl championship when the Eagles defeated the Kansas City Chiefs 40–22 in Super Bowl LIX.

Castro-Fields signed a reserve/future contract with the Eagles on February 14, 2025. On August 26, Castro-Fields was waived by Philadelphia with an injury designation by the Eagles as a part of final roster cuts. He was re-signed to the practice squad on October 13.

Castro-Fields signed a reserve/future contract with Philadelphia on January 12, 2026. On August 21, Castro-Fields was placed on injured reserve due to a heel injury. He was released with an injury settlement on August 29.
