= Noah Cain =

American football player (born 2000)

Profile
- Position: Running back

Personal information
- Born: December 17, 2000 (age 25); Baton Rouge, Louisiana, U.S.
- Listed height: 5 ft 11 in (1.80 m)
- Listed weight: 220 lb (100 kg)

Career information
- High school: IMG Academy
- College: Penn State (2019–2021); LSU (2022–2023)
- NFL draft: 2024: undrafted

Career history
- Cincinnati Bengals (2024)*
- * Offseason or practice squad member only

Noah St. John Cain (born December 17, 2000) is an American professional football running back. He played college football for the Penn State Nittany Lions and for the LSU Tigers and signed with the Cincinnati Bengals as an undrafted free agent in 2024.

== Early life ==
Cain grew up in Baton Rouge, Louisiana and attended high school at John H. Guyer High School in Denton, Texas before transferring to the powerhouse IMG Academy. During Cain's junior season, he rushed for 461 yards on 72 carries, while also hauling in 12 receptions for 230 yards, and totaling eight touchdown on the season. Coming out of high school, Cain was rated as a four star recruit, the 7th running back, and the 107th overall prospect in the 2019 recruiting class. Additionally, Cain held offers from schools such as Auburn, Georgia, Tennessee, Texas, and Penn State. Ultimately, Cain decided to commit to play college football for the Penn State Nittany Lions.

== College career ==
=== Penn State ===
During Cain's freshman season in 2019, he would rush for 443 yards and eight touchdowns. However, during the 2020 season in week one versus Indiana, after rushing three times for 13 yards on the Nittany Lions first drive, Cain would go down with a season ending injury. During the 2021 season, Cain would rush 106 times for 350 yards and three touchdowns. After the conclusion of the 2021 season, Cain decided to enter his name into the NCAA transfer portal.

=== LSU ===
Cain decided to transfer to play for the LSU Tigers. In Cain's first season, with LSU in 2022 he rushed for 409 yards and ten touchdowns on 76 carries while also hauling in nine receptions for 76 yards. His ten touchdowns led the LSU running backs in 2022. During the 2023 season, Cain rushed 37 times for 181 yards and three touchdowns, while also catching one pass for six yards and a touchdown. After the conclusion of the 2023 season, Cain decided to declare for the 2024 NFL draft.

== Professional career ==
Pre-draft measurables
Height	Weight	Arm length	Hand span	40-yard dash	10-yard split	20-yard split	20-yard shuttle	Three-cone drill	Vertical jump	Broad jump	Bench press
5 ft 10 in (1.78 m)	221 lb (100 kg)	30 1/2 in (0.77 m)	9 1/2 in (0.24 m)	4.71 s	1.65 s	2.72 s	4.71 s	7.41 s	30.5 in (0.77 m)	9 ft 0 in (2.74 m)	23 reps
All values from Pro Day

=== Cincinnati Bengals ===
After not being selected in the 2024 NFL draft, Cain signed with the Cincinnati Bengals as an undrafted free agent. On August 23, Cain was released by the Bengals.

== Personal life ==
Cain's cousin, Michael Clayton, played football at LSU and in the NFL for eight seasons with the Tampa Bay Buccaneers and the New York Giants.
