= Will Fries =

American football player (born 1998)

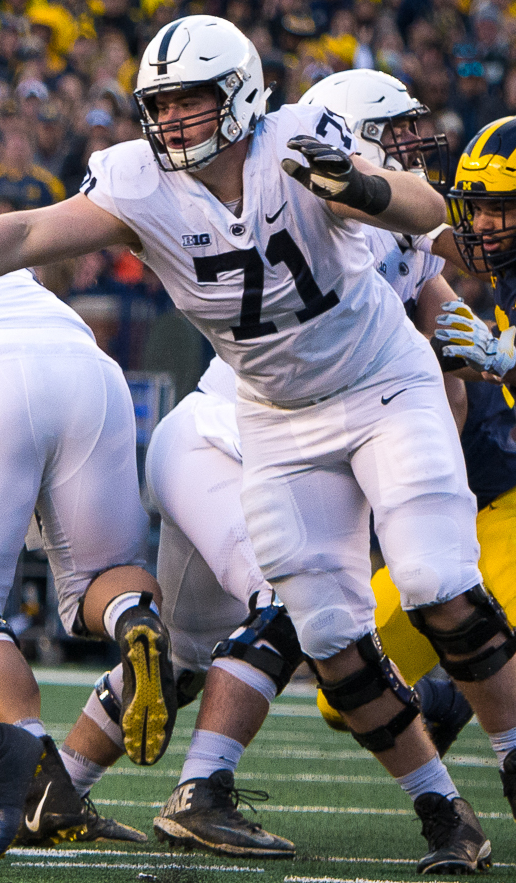
- Fries with the Penn State Nittany Lions in 2018

No. 76 – Minnesota Vikings
- Position: Guard
- Roster status: Active

Personal information
- Born: April 4, 1998 (age 28); Staten Island, New York, U.S.
- Listed height: 6 ft 6 in (1.98 m)
- Listed weight: 321 lb (146 kg)

Career information
- High school: Cranford (Cranford, New Jersey)
- College: Penn State (2016–2020)
- NFL draft: 2021: 7th round, 248th overall pick

Career history
- Indianapolis Colts (2021–2024); Minnesota Vikings (2025–present)

Awards and highlights
- Second-team All-Big Ten (2020)

Career NFL statistics as of Week 10, 2026
- Games played: 67
- Games started: 57
- Fumble recoveries: 1
- Stats at Pro Football Reference

William Connor Fries (born April 4, 1998) is an American professional football guard for the Minnesota Vikings of the National Football League (NFL). He played college football for the Penn State Nittany Lions and was selected by the Indianapolis Colts in the seventh round of the 2021 NFL draft.

== Early life ==
Raised in Cranford, New Jersey, Fries played prep football at Cranford High School.

Fries is married to women's basketball player Isabella Therien, who is the daughter of retired NHL hockey player, Chris Therien. His younger brother, Matt Fries plays college football for Monmouth University.

== Professional career ==
Pre-draft measurables
Height	Weight	Arm length	Hand span	Wingspan	40-yard dash	10-yard split	20-yard split	20-yard shuttle	Three-cone drill	Vertical jump	Broad jump	Bench press
6 ft 6 3/8 in (1.99 m)	309 lb (140 kg)	32 7/8 in (0.84 m)	10 1/4 in (0.26 m)	6 ft 7 7/8 in (2.03 m)	5.36 s	1.81 s	3.03 s	4.51 s	7.75 s	31.0 in (0.79 m)	9 ft 7 in (2.92 m)	24 reps
All values from Pro Day

=== Indianapolis Colts ===
Fries was selected by the Indianapolis Colts in the seventh round, 248th overall, of the 2021 NFL draft. On May 6, 2021, Fries officially signed with the Colts.

After beginning the 2022 season as a backup, Fries was named the starting right guard in Week 10, and started the remainder of the season. In 2023, Fries was named the Week 1 starting right guard, and started the entire season.

Fries returned as the starting right guard in 2024, but suffered a fractured right tibia in Week 5 and was placed on injured reserve on October 7, 2024.

=== Minnesota Vikings ===
On March 12, 2025, Fries signed a five-year, $88 million contract with the Minnesota Vikings. The signing was finalised shortly after the Vikings signed Fries' Colts offensive line teammate Ryan Kelly.
