= Sal Wormley =

American football player (born 2001)

Profile
- Position: Guard

Personal information
- Born: July 23, 2001 (age 25); Newark, New Jersey, U.S.
- Listed height: 6 ft 3 in (1.91 m)
- Listed weight: 327 lb (148 kg)

Career information
- High school: Smyrna (Smyrna, Delaware)
- College: Penn State (2019–2024)
- NFL draft: 2025: undrafted

Career history
- Jacksonville Jaguars (2025)

Awards and highlights
- Third-team All-Big Ten (2024)
- Stats at Pro Football Reference

Saleem Amir "Sal" Wormley (born July 23, 2001) is an American professional football guard. He played college football for the Penn State Nittany Lions.

== Early life ==
Wormley was born in Newark, New Jersey as one of two children to Makena Wormley. He attended Smyrna High School in Delaware where he played guard and defensive end with the Smyrna Eagles football team and competed as a member of the wrestling team. During his sophomore and junior years, Wormley helped the Eagles football team win consecutive state championships. In his senior year, Wormely served as team captain. Wormley's abilities earned him three letters in football and one letter in wrestling. He was rated a four-star recruiting prospect by 247Sports.com and received up to 17 athletic scholarships.

== College career ==
In 2019, Wormley enrolled at Penn State University. There he joined the field with the Nittany Lions as a redshirt freshman for a single game. Although he redshirted the 2020 season, Wormley appeared in three games, specifically as a special teams player. Wormley was absent from the 2021 season due to injury, and returned to the field the following year. During his redshirt junior season, Wormley returned to the field as a starting right guard and earned an All-Big Ten honorable mention for his performance. By the 2024 season, Wormley became the mainstay of the offensive line as he was the longest member since the 2019 recruiting class. He graduated with a degree in journalism and planned to earn a degree in African American studies.

== Professional career ==
Pre-draft measurables
Height	Weight	Arm length	Hand span	Wingspan	40-yard dash	10-yard split	20-yard split	20-yard shuttle	Vertical jump	Broad jump	Bench press
6 ft 3 3/8 in (1.91 m)	317 lb (144 kg)	32 7/8 in (0.84 m)	9 1/8 in (0.23 m)	6 ft 9 in (2.06 m)	5.25 s	1.70 s	3.01 s	5.06 s	26.5 in (0.67 m)	8 ft 1 in (2.46 m)	19 reps
All values from Pro Day

On April 26, 2025, Wormley signed a one-year contract with the Jacksonville Jaguars following the conclusion of the 2025 NFL draft. He was assigned to the practice squad after the active roster was finalized on August 27. Wormley signed a reserve/future contract with Jacksonville on January 12, 2026.

On June 4, 2026, Wormley was waived by the Jaguars.

== Personal life ==
Wormley has one brother named Jahlil Johnson.
