= Brandon Smith (linebacker) =

American football player (born 2001)

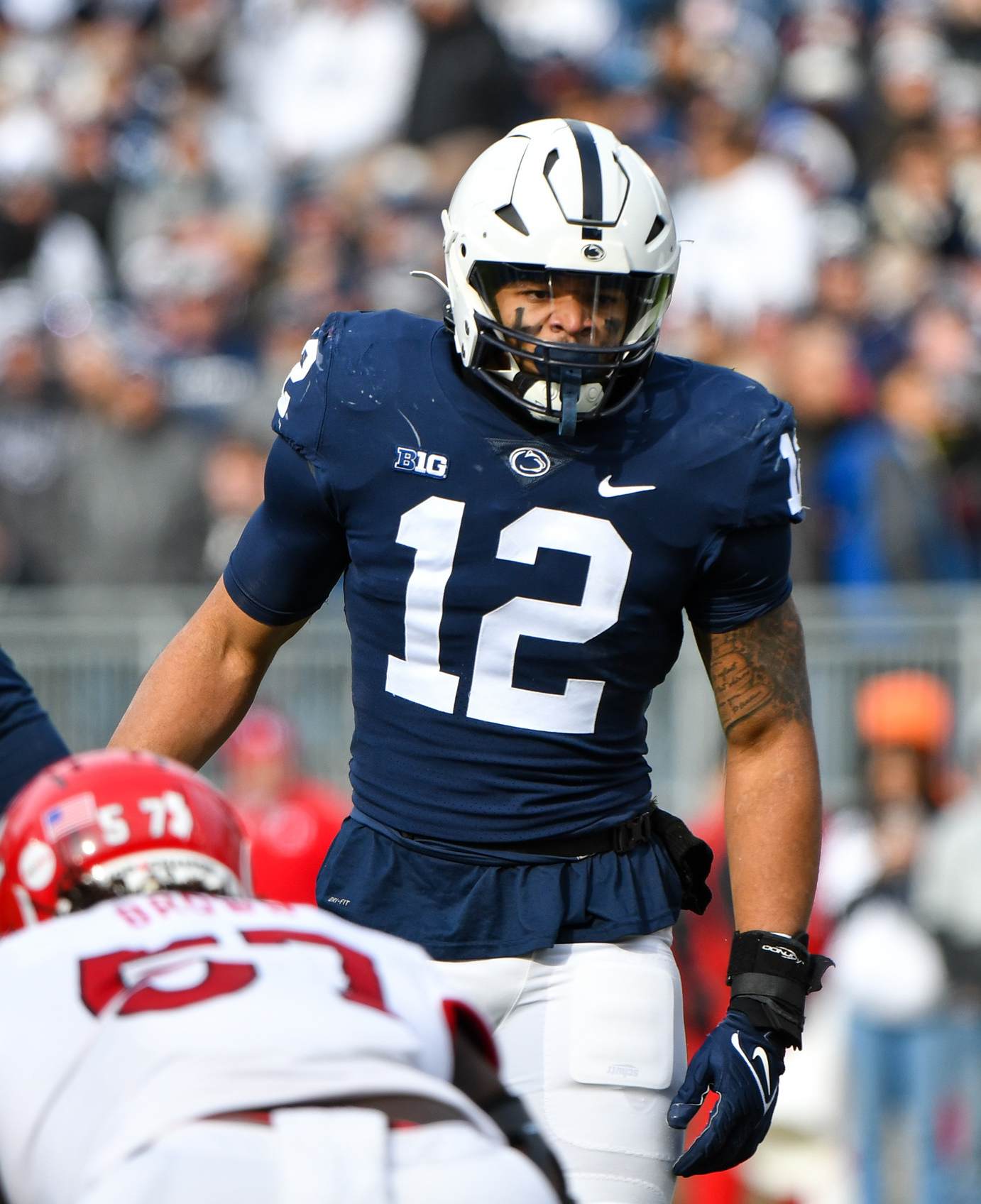
- Smith with the Penn State Nittany Lions in 2021

No. 40 – DC Defenders
- Position: Linebacker
- Roster status: Active

Personal information
- Born: April 12, 2001 (age 25); Henrico, Virginia, U.S.
- Listed height: 6 ft 3 in (1.91 m)
- Listed weight: 244 lb (111 kg)

Career information
- High school: Louisa County (Louisa, Virginia)
- College: Penn State (2019–2021)
- NFL draft: 2022: 4th round, 120th overall pick

Career history
- Carolina Panthers (2022); Philadelphia Eagles (2023–2024); New York Jets (2024)*; Las Vegas Raiders (2024)*; DC Defenders (2026–present)
- * Offseason or practice squad member only

Awards and highlights
- Third-team All-Big Ten (2021)

Career NFL statistics as of 2024
- Total tackles: 9
- Stats at Pro Football Reference

Brandon Nathaniel Smith (born April 12, 2001) is an American professional football linebacker for the DC Defenders of the United Football League (UFL). He played college football for the Penn State Nittany Lions, and was selected by the Carolina Panthers in the fourth round of the 2022 NFL draft.

== Early life ==
Smith attended Louisa County High School in Louisa, Virginia. As a senior in 2018, he was named the Gatorade Football Player of the Year for Virginia. He appeared in the 2019 Under Armour All-America Game. Smith committed to Penn State University to play college football.

== College career ==
As a true freshman at Penn State in 2019, Smith appeared in 13 games and had 13 tackles. As a sophomore in 2020, he started all nine games, recording 37 tackles, two sacks and one interception. Smith returned as a starter his junior season in 2021.

== Professional career ==
Pre-draft measurables
Height	Weight	Arm length	Hand span	Wingspan	40-yard dash	10-yard split	20-yard split	20-yard shuttle	Three-cone drill	Vertical jump	Broad jump	Bench press
6 ft 3 1/2 in (1.92 m)	250 lb (113 kg)	34 5/8 in (0.88 m)	10 1/4 in (0.26 m)	6 ft 9 1/2 in (2.07 m)	4.52 s	1.58 s	2.62 s	4.08 s	6.94 s	37.5 in (0.95 m)	10 ft 8 in (3.25 m)	19 reps
All values from NFL Combine/Pro Day

=== Carolina Panthers ===
Smith was drafted by the Carolina Panthers in the fourth round, 120th overall, of the 2022 NFL draft. He was waived on August 29, 2023.

=== Philadelphia Eagles ===
On October 12, 2023, Smith was signed to the practice squad of the Philadelphia Eagles. He signed a reserve/future contract on January 18, 2024.

Smith was waived on August 27, 2024, and re-signed to the practice squad. He was released on September 10.

=== New York Jets ===
On September 24, 2024, Smith was signed to the New York Jets practice squad. He was released on October 2.

=== Las Vegas Raiders ===
On December 4, 2024, Smith was signed to the Las Vegas Raiders practice squad. He signed a reserve/future contract with Las Vegas on January 6, 2025. On May 12, Smith was waived by the Raiders.

=== DC Defenders ===
On October 9, 2025, Smith signed with the Dallas Renegades of the United Football League (UFL). He was allocated to the DC Defenders on January 12.
