= P. J. Mustipher =

American football player (born 1998)

No. 90 – New York Giants
- Position: Nose tackle
- Roster status: Practice squad

Personal information
- Born: November 10, 1998 (age 27); Owings Mills, Maryland, U.S.
- Listed height: 6 ft 4 in (1.93 m)
- Listed weight: 320 lb (145 kg)

Career information
- High school: McDonogh (Owings Mills)
- College: Penn State (2018–2022)
- NFL draft: 2023: undrafted

Career history
- Denver Broncos (2023)*; New Orleans Saints (2023); Philadelphia Eagles (2024)*; Arizona Cardinals (2024–2025); New York Giants (2026–present)*
- * Offseason or practice squad member only

Awards and highlights
- 2× second-team All-Big Ten (2021, 2022)

Career NFL statistics as of 2025
- Total tackles: 36
- Stats at Pro Football Reference

Patrick Joseph Mustipher (born November 10, 1998) is an American professional football nose tackle for the New York Giants of the National Football League (NFL). He played college football for the Penn State Nittany Lions.

== Early life ==
Mustipher grew up in Owings Mills, Maryland and attended McDonogh High School. In his high school career Mustipher was named a MaxPrep underclassmen All-American. Mustipher committed to play college football at Penn State over other schools such as Alabama, Michigan, Notre Dame, and Ohio State.

== College career ==
In Mustipher's freshman season he put 14 tackles, one going for a loss, and one forced fumble. In Mustipher's sophomore year he took a step up after making 37 tackles, with 4.5 being for a loss, a sack, and a forced fumble. In Mustipher's junior season he had another good season after having 35 tackles, 1.5 going for a loss, a sack, and a pass deflection. However, in Mustipher's Senior season he was on pace for a breakout season after putting up 21 tackles, three being for a loss, and a sack. However, after just five game into the season Mustipher suffered a season ending injury and missed the rest of the 2021 season. For his performance on the year he was named a second team all-Big Ten Conference. Mustipher was also named a Rotary Lombardi Award semifinalist. Mustipher had a breakout season in his extra year of eligibility after posting 37 tackles, 0.5 being for a loss. For his performance on the year he was once again named second team all-Big Ten.

== Professional career ==
Pre-draft measurables
Height	Weight	Arm length	Hand span	Wingspan	40-yard dash	10-yard split	20-yard split	20-yard shuttle	Three-cone drill	Vertical jump	Broad jump	Bench press
6 ft 3 7/8 in (1.93 m)	320 lb (145 kg)	32 3/4 in (0.83 m)	9 in (0.23 m)	6 ft 7 3/8 in (2.02 m)	5.41 s	1.88 s	3.10 s	5.03 s	8.01 s	27.5 in (0.70 m)	8 ft 0 in (2.44 m)	19 reps
All values from NFL Combine

=== Denver Broncos ===
After not being selected in the 2023 NFL draft, Mustipher was signed by the Denver Broncos as an undrafted free agent. He was waived on August 29, 2023 and re-signed to the practice squad.

=== New Orleans Saints ===
On December 6, 2023, Mustipher was signed by the New Orleans Saints off the Broncos practice squad.

=== Philadelphia Eagles ===
On March 19, 2024, Mustipher signed with the Philadelphia Eagles. He was waived on August 27.

=== Arizona Cardinals ===
On August 29, 2024, Mustipher was signed to the Arizona Cardinals practice squad. He signed a reserve/future contract with the team on January 7, 2025.

On April 7, 2026, Mustipher re-signed with the Cardinals. He was placed on injured reserve on August 1, and later released on August 11.

=== New York Giants ===
On September 29, 2026, Mustipher was signed to the New York Giants practice squad, following a successful workout.

== Personal life ==
His brother, Sam Mustipher, is an NFL center.
