= 2023 Big Ten Conference football season =

- League: NCAA Division I Football Bowl Subdivision
- Sport: Football
- Duration: August 31, 2023 through January 1, 2024
- Teams: 14
- TV partner(s): Fox Sports (Fox/FS1, Big Ten Network), CBS Sports (CBS, Paramount+), NBC Sports (NBC, Peacock)

2024 NFL draft
- Top draft pick: Marvin Harrison Jr., WR, Ohio State
- Picked by: Arizona Cardinals, 4th overall

Regular season
- Season MVP: Marvin Harrison Jr., WR, Ohio State (Note: Also named the Graham–George Offensive Player of the Year.)
- East Division champions: Michigan
- West Division champions: Iowa

Championship Game
- Champions: Michigan
- Runners-up: Iowa
- Finals MVP: Mike Sainristil

Football seasons
- 2022 2024

2023 Big Ten Conference football standings
	Conf.			Overall
Team	W		L	W		L
East Division
No. 1 Michigan xy$#^	9	–	0	15	–	0
No. 10 Ohio State	8	–	1	11	–	2
No. 13 Penn State	7	–	2	10	–	3
Maryland	4	–	5	8	–	5
Rutgers	3	–	6	7	–	6
Indiana	1	–	8	3	–	9
Michigan State†	0	–	7	0	–	8
West Division
No. 24 Iowa xy	7	–	2	10	–	4
Northwestern	5	–	4	8	–	5
Wisconsin	5	–	4	7	–	6
Minnesota	3	–	6	6	–	7
Illinois	3	–	6	5	–	7
Nebraska	3	–	6	5	–	7
Purdue	3	–	6	4	–	8
Championship: Michigan 26, Iowa 0
# – College Football Playoff champion; ^ – College Football Playoff participant; $ – Conference champion; x – Division champion/co-champions; y – Championship game participant; † — NCAA vacated all wins for Michigan State (4–8, 2–7); Rankings from AP Poll

The 2023 Big Ten Conference football season was the 128th season of college football played for the Big Ten Conference and part of the 2023 NCAA Division I FBS football season. This was the Big Ten's tenth season with 14 teams, and its 13th and final season with a divisional scheduling format. The followed season, the conference expanded to 18 team with the addition of UCLA, USC, Oregon and Washington. This was the first year of the Big Ten's new media deal and thus its first year of no games airing on ESPN/ABC and first year of games airing on NBC Sports and CBS Sports properties. This was also the final year Northwestern played in the original Ryan Field before its demolition.

In the 2023 Big Ten Football Championship Game, the Michigan Wolverines, champions of the Big Ten's East Division, defeated the Iowa Hawkeyes, champions of the Western Division. Michigan advanced to the 2023–24 College Football Playoff, defeating Alabama in the 2024 Rose Bowl and Washington in the 2024 College Football Playoff National Championship.

== Coaching changes ==
There are four head coaching changes in the Big Ten for the 2023 season. Nebraska hired Matt Rhule to replace Scott Frost. Rhule most recently coached in the NFL with the Carolina Panthers.

Purdue hired Illinois defensive coordinator Ryan Walters to replace Jeff Brohm, who left for the head coaching job at his alma mater of Louisville.

Wisconsin released Paul Chryst and replaced him with Luke Fickell, who had been serving as the head coach at Cincinnati.

On July 10, 2023, Northwestern announced they were parting ways with head coach Pat Fitzgerald after allegations surrounding hazing within the Wildcat football program. On July 14, 2023, Northwestern named defensive coordinator David Braun the interim coach for the 2023 season.

On September 10, 2023, Michigan State coach Mel Tucker was suspended as part of an investigation into a sexual harassment claim. Secondary coach Harlon Barnett will serve as interim coach while the case is being sorted out. Tucker was officially fired on September 27.

On November 26, 2023, following the conclusion of the regular season, Indiana fired Tom Allen after the Hoosiers had completed a third consecutive losing season.

== Preseason ==
=== Recruiting classes ===
Rankings
Team	Rivals	Scout & 24/7	On3 Recruits	Signees
Illinois	35	42	40	23
Indiana	62	69	61	16
Iowa	31	39	39	22
Maryland	48	36	48	25
Michigan	18	17	18	25
Michigan State	36	23	22	16
Minnesota	38	44	47	21
Nebraska	25	24	29	28
Northwestern	45	47	44	19
Ohio State	4	5	4	20
Penn State	15	13	14	23
Purdue	67	67	58	18
Rutgers	65	57	60	19
Wisconsin	58	58	43	15

=== Big Ten Media Days ===
The teams, representatives and times(CT) in respective order were as follows:

- Big Ten Commissioner – Tony Petitti 10:30 – 11 a.m.

Media Day Schedule
Team	Head coach	Time	Players
Wednesday, July 26
Illinois	Bret Bielema	11:00 a.m.	Johnny Newton (DL), Keith Randolph Jr. (DL), Isaiah Williams (WR)
Rutgers	Greg Schiano	11:15 a.m.	Deion Jennings (LB), Johnny Langan (TE), Aaron Lewis (DL)
Michigan State	Mel Tucker	11:30 a.m.	J.D. Duplain (G), Cal Haladay (LB), Tre Mosley (WR)
Northwestern	David Braun	11:45 a.m.	–
Penn State	James Franklin	12:00 p.m.	Keaton Ellis (S), Olumuyiwa Fashanu (OL), Adisa Isaac (DE)
Iowa	Kirk Ferentz	12:15 p.m.	Cooper DeJean (DB), Jay Higgins (LB), Luke Lachey (TE)
Ohio State	Ryan Day	12:30 p.m.	Marvin Harrison Jr. (WR), Cade Stover (TE), JT Tuimoloau (DE)
Thursday, July 27
Indiana	Tom Allen	11:00 a.m.	Aaron Casey (LB), Jaylin Lucas (RB/RS), Noah Pierre (DB)
Maryland	Mike Locksley	11:15 a.m.	Roman Hemby (RB), Tarheeb Still (DB), Taulia Tagovailoa (QB)
Minnesota	P. J. Fleck	11:30 a.m.	Chris Autman-Bell (WR), Tyler Nubin (DB), Brevyn Spann-Ford (TE)
Purdue	Ryan Walters	11:45 a.m.	Hudson Card (QB), Sanoussi Kane (DB), TJ Sheffield (WR)
Nebraska	Matt Rhule	12:00 p.m.	Ethan Piper (G), Luke Reimer (LB), Jeff Sims (G)
Wisconsin	Luke Fickell	12:15 p.m.	Braelon Allen (RB), Tanner Mordecai (QB), Maema Njongmeta (LB)
Michigan	Jim Harbaugh	12:30 p.m.	Blake Corum (RB), Kris Jenkins (DT), Mike Sainristil (CB)

Notes:

- Northwestern players opted out of the media day due to Northwestern hazing scandal.

==== Preseason Media Poll ====
The annual Cleveland.com Preseason Big Ten Media Poll.

East
Predicted finish	Team	Points (1st place votes)
1	Michigan	248 (27)
2	Ohio State	226 (8)
3	Penn State	192 (2)
4	Maryland	143
5	Michigan State	105
6	Rutgers	74
7	Indiana	48

West
Predicted finish	Team	Points (1st place votes)
1	Wisconsin	233 (20)
2	Iowa	232 (16)
3	Minnesota	176 (1)
4	Illinois	152
5	Nebraska	116
6	Purdue	89
7	Northwestern	38

Media poll (Big Ten Championship)
Rank	Team	Votes
1	Michigan over Wisconsin	15
2	Michigan over Iowa	11
T3	Ohio State over Iowa	4
T3	Ohio State over Wisconsin	4
T5	Michigan over Minnesota	1
T5	Penn State over Iowa	1
T5	Penn State over Wisconsin	1

==== Preseason Player of the Year ====
Below are the results of the annual Preseason Big Ten Player of the Year awards conducted by Cleveland.com.

Preseason Offensive Player of the Year
Rank	Player	Position	Team	Points (1st place votes)
1	Marvin Harrison Jr.	WR	Ohio State	94 (27)
2	Blake Corum	RB	Michigan	56 (4)
3	J. J. McCarthy	QB	Michigan	27 (5)
4	Braelon Allen	RB	Wisconsin	21
T5	Nick Singleton	RB	Penn State	6
T5	Taulia Tagovailoa	QB	Maryland	6
7	Kyle McCord	QB	Ohio State	5
T8	Olu Fashanu	OT	Penn State	2
T8	TreVeyon Henderson	RB	Ohio State	2
T8	Donovan Edwards	RB	Michigan	2
11	Emeka Egbuka	WR	Ohio State	1

Preseason Defensive Player of the Year
Rank	Player	Position	Team	Points (1st place votes)
1	Cooper DeJean	DB	Iowa	42 (6)
2	Johnny Newton	DT	Illinois	41 (7)
3	Tommy Eichenberg	LB	Ohio State	29 (6)
4	JT Tuimoloau	DE	Ohio State	28 (5)
5	Kalen King	DB	Penn State	22 (1)
6	Abdul Carter	LB	Penn State	20 (5)
7	Chop Robinson	DE	Penn State	13 (3)
8	Denzel Burke	DB	Ohio State	7( 1)
T9	Junior Colson	LB	Michigan	5 (1)
T9	Will Johnson	DB	Michigan	5 (1)
11	Mike Hall Jr.	DT	Ohio State	3 (1)
T12	Cal Haladay	LB	Michigan State	2
T12	Jack Sawyer	DE	Ohio State	2
T14	Maema Njongmeta	LB	Wisconsin	1
T14	Tyler Nubin	DB	Minnesota	1
T14	Nic Scourton	LB	Purdue	1

==== Individual awards ====
Award	Head Coach/Player	School	Position	Year	Ref
Lott Trophy	Jaishawn Barham	Maryland	LB	So.	
Lott Trophy	Abdul Carter	Penn State	LB	So.	
Lott Trophy	Junior Colson	Michigan	LB	Jr.	
Lott Trophy	Tommy Eichenberg	Ohio State	LB	Sr.	
Lott Trophy	JT Tuimoloau	Ohio State	DE	Jr.	
Lott Trophy	Will Johnson	Michigan	DB	So.	
Lott Trophy	Kalen King	Penn State	DB	Jr.	
Lott Trophy	Johnny Newton	Illinois	DT	Jr.	
Dodd Trophy	Ryan Day	Ohio State	—	—	
Dodd Trophy	Kirk Ferentz	Iowa	—	—	
Dodd Trophy	P. J. Fleck	Minnesota	—	—	
Dodd Trophy	Jim Harbaugh	Michigan	—	—	
Dodd Trophy	Mel Tucker	Michigan State	—	—	
Maxwell Award	Isaiah Williams	Illinois	WR	Jr.	
Maxwell Award	Cade McNamara	Iowa	QB	Sr.	
Maxwell Award	Taulia Tagovailoa	Maryland	QB	Sr.	
Maxwell Award	J. J. McCarthy	Michigan	QB	Jr.	
Maxwell Award	Blake Corum	Michigan	RB	Sr.	
Maxwell Award	Marvin Harrison Jr.	Ohio State	WR	Jr.	
Maxwell Award	Emeka Egbuka	Ohio State	WR	Jr.	
Maxwell Award	Nicholas Singleton	Penn State	RB	So.	
Maxwell Award	Hudson Card	Purdue	QB	Jr.	
Maxwell Award	Tanner Mordecai	Wisconsin	QB	Sr.	
Maxwell Award	Braelon Allen	Wisconsin	RB	Jr.	
Davey O'Brien Award			QB		
Doak Walker Award			RB		
Biletnikoff Award			WR		
John Mackey Award			TE		
Rimington Trophy			OL		
Butkus Award			LB		
Jim Thorpe Award			DB		
Bronko Nagurski Trophy	Cooper DeJean	Iowa	CB	Jr.	
Bronko Nagurski Trophy	Tommy Eichenberg	Iowa	LB	Sr.	
Bronko Nagurski Trophy	Cal Haladay	Michigan State	LB	(redshirt) Jr.	
Bronko Nagurski Trophy	Kris Jenkins	Michigan	DT	Sr.	
Bronko Nagurski Trophy	Rod Moore	Michigan	S	Jr.	
Bronko Nagurski Trophy	Abdul Carter	Penn State	LB	So.	
Bronko Nagurski Trophy	Kalen King	Penn State	DB	Jr.	
Bronko Nagurski Trophy	Chop Robinson	Penn State	DE	Jr.	
Bronko Nagurski Trophy	Johnny Newton	Illinois	DT	Jr.	
Bronko Nagurski Trophy	Keith Randolph Jr.	Illinois	DT	Jr.	
Bronko Nagurski Trophy	Maema Njongmeta	Wisconsin	LB	(redshirt) Sr.	
Bronko Nagurski Trophy	Tyler Nubin	Minnesota	S	Sr.	
Bronko Nagurski Trophy	Lathan Ransom	Ohio State	S	Sr.	
Bronko Nagurski Trophy	JT Tuimoloau	Ohio State	DE	Jr.	
Outland Trophy	Olu Fashanu	Penn State	OT	Jr.	
Outland Trophy	Isaiah Adams	Illinois	OG	Sr.	
Outland Trophy	Keith Randolph Jr.	Illinois	DT	Jr.	
Outland Trophy	Mike Hall Jr.	Ohio State	DT	Jr.	
Outland Trophy	Donovan Jackson	Ohio State	OG	Jr.	
Outland Trophy	Gus Hartwig	Purdue	C	Sr.	
Outland Trophy	Kris Jenkins	Michigan	DT	Sr.	
Outland Trophy	Zak Zinter	Michigan	OG	Sr.	
Outland Trophy	Trevor Keegan	Michigan	OG	GS	
Outland Trophy	Drake Nugent	Michigan	C	GS	
Outland Trophy	Matthew Jones	Ohio State	OG	Sr.	

Award	Head Coach/Player	School	Position	Year	Ref
Lou Groza Award	Drew Stevens	Iowa	PK	So.	
Lou Groza Award	James Turner	Michigan	PK	Sr.	
Lou Groza Award	Nathanial Vakos	Wisconsin	PK	So.	
Ray Guy Award	Brian Buschini	Nebraska	P	Jr.	
Ray Guy Award	Colton Spangler	Maryland	P	Sr.	
Ray Guy Award	Jack Ansell	Purdue	P	Jr.	
Ray Guy Award	James Evans	Indiana	P	So.	
Ray Guy Award	Jesse Mirco	Ohio State	P	Jr.	
Ray Guy Award	Tory Taylor	Iowa	P	Sr.	
Paul Hornung Award	Cooper DeJean	Iowa	DB	Jr.	
Paul Hornung Award	Chimere Dike	Wisconsin	WR	Sr.	
Paul Hornung Award	Emeka Egbuka	Ohio State	WR	Jr.	
Paul Hornung Award	Jeshaun Jones	Maryland	WR	GS	
Paul Hornung Award	Jaylin Lucas	Indiana	WR	So.	
Paul Hornung Award	Nicholas Singleton	Penn State	RB	So.	
Wuerffel Trophy	Dvon Ellies	Penn State	DT	Sr.	
Wuerffel Trophy	Tre Mosley	Michigan State	WR	Sr.	
Wuerffel Trophy	Isaiah Williams	Illinois	WR	Jr.	
Walter Camp Award	Braelon Allen	Wisconsin	RB	Jr.	
Walter Camp Award	Blake Corum	Michigan	RB	Sr.	
Walter Camp Award	J. J. McCarthy	Michigan	QB	Jr.	
Walter Camp Award	Emeka Egbuka	Ohio State	WR	Jr.	
Walter Camp Award	TreVeyon Henderson	Ohio State	RB	Jr.	
Walter Camp Award	Marvin Harrison Jr.	Ohio State	WR	Sr.	
Walter Camp Award	Tommy Eichenberg	Ohio State	LB	Sr.	
Walter Camp Award	Olu Fashanu	Penn State	OT	Jr.	
Walter Camp Award	Nicholas Singleton	Penn State	RB	So.	
Walter Camp Award	Jaylin Lucas	Indiana	RB/KR	So.	
Walter Camp Award	Johnny Newton	Illinois	DT	Jr.	
Bednarik Award			LB		
Rotary Lombardi Award					
Patrick Mannelly Award			LS		
Earl Campbell Tyler Rose Award					
Polynesian College Football Player Of The Year Award					
Manning Award	J. J. McCarthy	Michigan	QB	Jr.	
Manning Award	Taulia Tagovailoa	Maryland	QB	Sr.	
Johnny Unitas Golden Arm Award			QB		
Ted Hendricks Award					

==== All−American Teams ====
	AP 1st Team	AP 2nd Team	AS 1st Team	AS 2nd Team	AS 3rd Team	AS 4th Team	WCFF 1st Team	WCFF 2nd Team	ESPN	CBS 1st Team	CBS 2nd Team	CFN 1st Team	CFN 2nd Team	PFF 1st Team	PFF 2nd Team	PFF 3rd Team	SN 1st Team	SN 2nd Team
Braelon Allen		✓		✓				✓			✓	✓				✓		
Abdul Carter					✓													
Connor Colby													✓					
Junior Colson				✓														
Blake Corum	✓		✓				✓		✓	✓		✓		✓			✓	
Cooper DeJean	✓			✓							✓				✓			✓
Donovan Edwards					✓													
Tommy Eichenberg	✓		✓				✓			✓					✓		✓	
Emeka Egbuka	✓		✓					✓	✓		✓		✓	✓			✓	
Olumuyiwa Fashanu	✓		✓				✓		✓	✓			✓	✓			✓	
Brevyn Spann-Ford								✓							✓			
Marvin Harrison Jr.	✓		✓				✓		✓	✓		✓		✓			✓	
TreVeyon Henderson					✓													
Donovan Jackson		✓			✓						✓		✓			✓		✓
Kris Jenkins					✓						✓				✓			
Will Johnson		✓			✓						✓			✓				
Matthew Jones						✓												
Kalen King	✓		✓				✓		✓	✓				✓			✓	
Jaylin Lucas			✓				✓			✓								
Rod Moore						✓										✓		
Johnny Newton	✓		✓				✓		✓	✓				✓			✓	
Tyler Nubin																		✓
Drake Nugent				✓			✓									✓		
Keith Randolph Jr.					✓													
Lathan Ransom						✓												
Chop Robinson				✓				✓							✓			✓
Nicholas Singleton					✓													✓
Tory Taylor	✓		✓					✓		✓				✓			✓	
JT Tuimoloau		✓	✓							✓						✓	✓	
Zak Zinter	✓			✓				✓			✓			✓				✓

== Rankings ==
		Pre	Wk 1	Wk 2	Wk 3	Wk 4	Wk 5	Wk 6	Wk 7	Wk 8	Wk 9	Wk 10	Wk 11	Wk 12	Wk 13	Wk 14	Final
Illinois	AP	RV	RV														
Illinois	C	RV	RV														
Illinois	CFP	Not released															
Indiana	AP																
Indiana	C																
Indiana	CFP	Not released															
Iowa	AP	25	RV	25	24			RV	24			RV	RV	20	18	20	24
Iowa	C	RV	RV	24	22	RV	RV	RV	23	RV	RV	RV	23	19	17	20	22
Iowa	CFP	Not released										22	16	17	16	17	
Maryland	AP			RV	RV	RV	RV	RV									
Maryland	C	RV	RV	RV	RV	RV	RV	RV	RV	RV							
Maryland	CFP	Not released															
Michigan	AP	2 (2)	2 (2)	2 (2)	2 (2)	2 (1)	2 (12)	2 (11)	2 (16)	2 (19)	2 (9)	2 (9)	2 (7)	3	2 (10)	1 (51)	1 (61)
Michigan	C	2	2 (1)	2 (1)	2 (1)	2	2 (1)	2	2 (4)	2 (4)	2 (3)	2 (4)	2 (3)	3 (1)	2 (4)	1 (51)	1 (63)
Michigan	CFP	Not released									3	3	3	3	2	1	
Michigan State	AP																
Michigan State	C		RV	RV													
Michigan State	CFP	Not released															
Minnesota	AP	RV	RV	RV													
Minnesota	C	RV	RV	RV													
Minnesota	CFP	Not released															
Nebraska	AP																
Nebraska	C																
Nebraska	CFP	Not released															
Northwestern	AP																RV
Northwestern	C																RV
Northwestern	CFP	Not released															
Ohio State	AP	3 (1)	5	6	6	4 (1)	4 (1)	3 (1)	3 (1)	3 (3)	3 (3)	3 (3)	3 (1)	2 (1)	6	7	10
Ohio State	C	4 (1)	4	4	4 (1)	3 (2)	3 (2)	3 (2)	3 (1)	3 (2)	3 (3)	3 (5)	3 (3)	2 (1)	6	7	10
Ohio State	CFP	Not released									1	1	2	2	6	7	
Penn State	AP	7	7	7	7	6	6	6	7	10	9	9	12	11	10	10	13
Penn State	C	7	7	7	7	7	6	5	6	10	9	9	12	11	10	10	13
Penn State	CFP	Not released									11	10	12	11	10	10	
Purdue	AP																
Purdue	C																
Purdue	CFP	Not released															
Rutgers	AP									RV	RV						
Rutgers	C																
Rutgers	CFP	Not released															
Wisconsin	AP	19	19	RV	RV	RV	RV	RV		RV							
Wisconsin	C	21	19	RV			RV	RV		RV							
Wisconsin	CFP	Not released															

Legend
	Improvement in ranking
	Drop in ranking
	Not ranked previous week
	No change in ranking from previous week
RV	Received votes but were not ranked in Top 25 of poll
т	Tied with team above or below also with this symbol

== Schedule ==
Index to colors and formatting
Big Ten member won
Big Ten member lost
Big Ten teams in **bold**

All times Eastern time.

† denotes Homecoming game

=== Regular season schedule ===
==== Week 1 ====
Date	Time	Visiting team	Home team	Site	TV	Result	Attendance	Ref.
August 31	8:00 p.m.	**Nebraska**	**Minnesota**	Huntington Bank Stadium • Minneapolis, MN ($5 Bits of Broken Chair)	FOX	**MIN** 13–10	53,629	
September 1	7:00 p.m.	Central Michigan	**Michigan State**	Spartan Stadium • East Lansing, MI	FS1	**W** 31–7	73,216	
September 2	12:00 p.m.	East Carolina	No. 2 **Michigan**	Michigan Stadium • Ann Arbor, MI	Peacock	**W** 30–3	109,480	
September 2	12:00 p.m.	Utah State	No. 25 **Iowa**	Kinnick Stadium • Iowa City, IA	FS1	**W** 24–14	69,250	
September 2	12:00 p.m.	Fresno State	**Purdue**	Ross-Ade Stadium • West Lafayette, IN	BTN	**L** 35–39	54,898	
September 2	3:30 p.m.	No. 3 **Ohio State**	**Indiana**	Memorial Stadium • Bloomington, IN	CBS	**OSU** 23–3	50,050	
September 2	3:30 p.m.	Buffalo	No. 19 **Wisconsin**	Camp Randall Stadium • Madison, WI	FS1	**W** 38–17	76,224	
September 2	3:30 p.m.	Towson	**Maryland**	SECU Stadium • College Park, MD	BTN	**W** 38–6	37,241	
September 2	7:30 p.m.	Toledo	**Illinois**	Memorial Stadium • Champaign, IL	BTN	**W** 30–28	48,898	
September 2	7:30 p.m.	West Virginia	No. 7 **Penn State**	Beaver Stadium • University Park, PA (PSU-WVU rivalry)	NBC	**W** 38–15	110,747	
September 3	12:00 p.m.	**Northwestern**	**Rutgers**	SHI Stadium • Piscataway, NJ	CBS	**RUT** 24–7	53,026	
^{#}Rankings from AP Poll released prior to game. All times are in Eastern Time.

==== Week 2 ====
Date	Time	Visiting team	Home team	Site	TV	Result	Attendance	Ref.
September 8	7:00 p.m.	Indiana State	**Indiana**	Memorial Stadium • Bloomington, IN	BTN	**W** 41–7	42,775	
September 8	7:30 p.m.	**Illinois**	Kansas	Memorial Stadium • Lawrence, KS	ESPN2	**L** 23–34	45,809	
September 9	12:00 p.m.	No. 25 (FCS) Youngstown State	No. 5 **Ohio State**	Ohio Stadium • Columbus, OH	BTN	**W** 35–7	102,897	
September 9	12:00 p.m.	**Nebraska**	No. 22 Colorado	Folsom Field • Boulder, CO (CU-NU rivalry)	FOX	**L** 14–36	53,241	
September 9	12:00 p.m.	**Purdue**	Virginia Tech	Lane Stadium • Blacksburg, VA	ESPN2	**W** 24–17	65,632	
September 9	12:00 p.m.	No. 19 (FCS) Delaware	No. 7 **Penn State**	Beaver Stadium • University Park, PA	Peacock	**W** 63–7	108,575	
September 9	3:30 p.m.	UNLV	No. 2 **Michigan**	Michigan Stadium • Ann Arbor, MI	CBS	**W** 35–7	109,482	
September 9	3:30 p.m.	Richmond	**Michigan State**	Spartan Stadium • East Lansing, MI	BTN	**W** 45–14	70,049	
September 9	3:30 p.m.	UTEP	**Northwestern**	Ryan Field • Evanston, IL	BTN	**W** 38–7	14,851	
September 9	3:30 p.m.	**Iowa**	Iowa State	Jack Trice Stadium • Ames, IA (Cy-Hawk Series)	FOX	**W** 20–13	61,500	
September 9	7:30 p.m.	Eastern Michigan	**Minnesota**	Huntington Bank Stadium • Minneapolis, MN	BTN	**W** 25–6	48,101	
September 9	7:30 p.m.	Temple	**Rutgers**	SHI Stadium • Piscataway, NJ	BTN	**W** 36–7	45,317	
September 9	7:30 p.m.	No. 19 **Wisconsin**	Washington State	Martin Stadium • Pullman, WA	ABC	**L** 22–31	33,024	
September 9	7:30 p.m.	Charlotte	**Maryland**	SECU Stadium • College Park, MD	NBC	**W** 38–20	32,804	
^{#}Rankings from AP Poll released prior to game. All times are in Eastern Time.

==== Week 3 ====
Date	Time	Visiting team	Home team	Site	TV	Result	Attendance	Ref.
September 15	7:00 p.m.	Virginia	**Maryland**	SECU Stadium • College Park, MD (MD-UVA rivalry)	FS1	**W** 42–14	37,041	
September 16	12:00 p.m.	No. 7 **Penn State**	**Illinois**	Memorial Stadium • Champaign, IL	FOX	**PSU** 30–13	49,099	
September 16	12:00 p.m.	Georgia Southern	**Wisconsin**	Camp Randall Stadium • Madison, WI	BTN	**W** 35–14	75,610	
September 16	12:00 p.m.	**Indiana**	Louisville	Lucas Oil Stadium • Indianapolis, IN	BTN	**L** 14–21		
September 16	3:30 p.m.	Western Michigan	No. 25 **Iowa**	Kinnick Stadium • Iowa City, IA	BTN	**W** 41–10	69,250	
September 16	3:30 p.m.	Virginia Tech	**Rutgers**	SHI Stadium • Piscataway, NJ	BTN	**W** 35–16	52,657	
September 16	3:30 p.m.	**Minnesota**	No. 20 North Carolina	Kenan Memorial Stadium • Chapel Hill, NC	ESPN	**L** 13–31	45,151	
September 16	3:30 p.m.	**Northwestern**	No. 21 Duke	Wallace Wade Stadium • Durham, NC	ACCN	**L** 14–38	18,141	
September 16	4:00 p.m.	Western Kentucky	No. 6 **Ohio State**	Ohio Stadium • Columbus, OH	FOX	**W** 63–10	100,217	
September 16	5:00 p.m.	No. 8 Washington	**Michigan State**	Spartan Stadium • East Lansing, MI	Peacock	**L** 7–41	70,528	
September 16	7:00 p.m.	Northern Illinois	**Nebraska**	Memorial Stadium • Lincoln, NE	FS1	**W** 35–11	86,875	
September 16	7:30 p.m.	Syracuse	**Purdue**	Ross-Ade Stadium • West Lafayette, IN	NBC	**L** 20–35	61,441	
September 16	7:30 p.m.	Bowling Green	No. 2 **Michigan**	Michigan Stadium • Ann Arbor, MI	BTN	**W** 31–6	109,955	
^{#}Rankings from AP Poll released prior to game. All times are in Eastern Time.

==== Week 4 ====
Date	Time	Visiting team	Home team	Site	TV	Result	Attendance	Ref.
September 22	7:00 p.m.	**Wisconsin**	**Purdue**	Ross-Ade Stadium • West Lafayette, IN	FS1	**WIS** 38–17	55,529	
September 23†	12:00 p.m.	**Rutgers**	No. 2 **Michigan**	Michigan Stadium • Ann Arbor, MI	BTN	**MICH** 31–7	109,756	
September 23†	3:30 p.m.	**Maryland**	**Michigan State**	Spartan Stadium • East Lansing, MI	NBC	**MD** 31–9	70,131	
September 23	3:30 p.m.	Florida Atlantic	**Illinois**	Memorial Stadium • Champaign, IL	BTN	**W** 23–17	53,512	
September 23	3:30 p.m.	Louisiana Tech	**Nebraska**	Memorial Stadium • Lincoln, NE	BTN	**W** 28–14	87,115	
September 23	7:30 p.m.	No. 24 **Iowa**	No. 7 **Penn State**	Beaver Stadium • University Park, PA	CBS	**PSU** 31–0	110,830	
September 23	7:30 p.m.	No. 6 **Ohio State**	No. 9 Notre Dame	Notre Dame Stadium • South Bend, IN	NBC	**W** 17–14	77,622	
September 23	7:30 p.m.	Akron	**Indiana**	Memorial Stadium • Bloomington, IN	BTN	**W** 29–27 ^{4OT}	44,968	
September 23	7:30 p.m.	**Minnesota**	**Northwestern**	Ryan Field • Evanston, IL	BTN	**NW** 37–34 ^{OT}	20,148	
^{†}Homecoming. ^{#}Rankings from AP Poll released prior to game. All times are in Eastern Time.

==== Week 5 ====
Date	Time	Visiting team	Home team	Site	TV	Result	Attendance	Ref.
September 30	12:00 p.m.	No. 6 **Penn State**	Northwestern	Ryan Field • Evanston, IL	BTN	**PSU** 41–13	25,064	
September 30†	12:00 p.m.	Louisiana	Minnesota	Huntington Bank Stadium • Minneapolis, MN	BTN	**W** 35–24	46,843	
September 30†	3:30 p.m.	**Illinois**	Purdue	Ross-Ade Stadium • West Lafayette, IN (Purdue Cannon)	Peacock	**PUR** 44–19	59,510	
September 30	3:30 p.m.	**Indiana**	Maryland	SECU Stadium • College Park, MD	BTN	**MD** 44–17	38,181	
September 30	3:30 p.m.	Wagner	Rutgers	SHI Stadium • Piscataway, NJ	BTN	**W** 52–3	40,165	
September 30	3:30 p.m.	No. 2 **Michigan**	Nebraska	Memorial Stadium • Lincoln, NE	FOX	**MICH** 45–7	87,134	
September 30	7:30 p.m.	**Michigan State**	Iowa	Kinnick Stadium • Iowa City, IA	NBC	**IA** 26–16	69,250	
^{†}Homecoming. ^{#}Rankings from AP Poll released prior to game. All times are in Eastern Time.

Date	Bye Week	
September 30	No. 4 Ohio State	Wisconsin

==== Week 6 ====
Date	Time	Visiting team	Home team	Site	TV	Result	Attendance	Ref.
October 6	8:00 p.m.	**Nebraska**	**Illinois**	Memorial Stadium • Champaign, IL	FS1	**NEB** 20–7	46,703	
October 7†	12:00 p.m.	**Maryland**	No. 4 **Ohio State**	Ohio Stadium • Columbus, OH	FOX	**OSU** 37–17	104,974	
October 7†	12:00 p.m.	**Rutgers**	**Wisconsin**	Camp Randall Stadium • Madison, WI	Peacock	**WIS** 24–13	74,885	
October 7†	3:00 p.m.	Howard	**Northwestern**	Ryan Field • Evanston, IL	BTN	**W** 23–20	22,160	
October 7†	3:30 p.m.	**Purdue**	**Iowa**	Kinnick Stadium • Iowa City, IA	Peacock	**IA** 20–14	69,250	
October 7	7:30 p.m.	No. 2 **Michigan**	**Minnesota**	Huntington Bank Stadium • Minneapolis, MN (Little Brown Jug)	NBC	**MICH** 52–10	52,179	
^{†}Homecoming. ^{#}Rankings from AP Poll released prior to game. All times are in Eastern Time.

Date	Bye Week		
October 7	Indiana	Michigan State	No. 6 Penn State

==== Week 7 ====
Date	Time	Visiting team	Home team	Site	TV	Result	Attendance	Ref.
October 14	12:00 p.m.	No. 3 **Ohio State**	**Purdue**	Ross-Ade Stadium • West Lafayette, IN	Peacock	**OSU** 41–7	57,319	
October 14	12:00 p.m.	**Indiana**	No. 2 **Michigan**	Michigan Stadium • Ann Arbor, MI	FOX	**MICH** 52–7	110,264	
October 14†	12:00 p.m.	**Michigan State**	**Rutgers**	SHI Stadium • Piscataway, NJ	BTN	**RUT** 27–24	52,879	
October 14†	3:30 p.m.	**Illinois**	**Maryland**	SECU Stadium • College Park, MD	NBC	**ILL** 27–24	35,580	
October 14†	3:30 p.m.	Massachusetts	No. 6 **Penn State**	Beaver Stadium • University Park, PA	BTN	**W** 63–0	105,533	
October 14	4:00 p.m.	**Iowa**	**Wisconsin**	Camp Randall Stadium • Madison, WI (Heartland Trophy)	FOX	**IA** 15–6	76,205	
^{†}Homecoming. ^{#}Rankings from AP Poll released prior to game. All times are in Eastern Time.

Date	Bye Week		
October 14	Minnesota	Nebraska	Northwestern

==== Week 8 ====
Date	Time	Visiting team	Home team	Site	TV	Result	Attendance	Ref.
October 21	12:00 PM	No. 7 **Penn State**	No. 3 **Ohio State**	Ohio Stadium • Columbus, OH (rivalry)	FOX	**OSU** 20–12	105,506	
October 21†	12:00 PM	**Rutgers**	**Indiana**	Memorial Stadium • Bloomington, IN	BTN	**RUT** 31–14	43,611	
October 21	3:30 PM	**Minnesota**	No. 24 **Iowa**	Kinnick Stadium • Iowa City, IA (Floyd of Rosedale)	NBC	**MIN** 12–10	69,250	
October 21†	3:30 PM	**Wisconsin**	**Illinois**	Memorial Stadium • Champaign, IL	FS1	**WIS** 25–21	54,205	
October 21	3:30 PM	**Northwestern**	**Nebraska**	Memorial Stadium • Lincoln, NE	BTN	**NEB** 17–9	86,769	
October 21	7:30 PM	No. 2 **Michigan**	**Michigan State**	Spartan Stadium • East Lansing, MI (Paul Bunyan Trophy)	NBC	**MICH** 49–0	74,206	
^{†}Homecoming. ^{#}Rankings from AP Poll released prior to game. All times are in Eastern Time.

Date	Bye Week	
October 21	Maryland	Purdue

==== Week 9 ====
Date	Time	Visiting team	Home team	Site	TV	Result	Attendance	Ref.
October 28	12:00 PM	**Indiana**	No. 10 **Penn State**	Beaver Stadium • University Park, PA	CBS	**PSU** 33–24	107,209	
October 28	12:00 PM	**Maryland**	**Northwestern**	Ryan Field • Evanston, IL	BTN	**NW** 33–27	19,286	
October 28†	3:30 PM	**Purdue**	**Nebraska**	Memorial Stadium • Lincoln, NE	FS1	**NEB** 31–14	86,709	
October 28	3:30 PM	**Michigan State**	**Minnesota**	Huntington Bank Stadium • Minneapolis, MN	BTN	**MIN** 27–12	47,392	
October 28	7:30 PM	No. 3 **Ohio State**	**Wisconsin**	Camp Randall Stadium • Madison, WI	NBC	**OSU** 24–10	76,453	
^{†}Homecoming. ^{#}Rankings from AP Poll released prior to game. All times are in Eastern Time.

Date	Bye Week			
October 28	Illinois	Iowa	#2 Michigan	Rutgers

==== Week 10 ====
Date	Time	Visiting team	Home team	Site	TV	Result	Attendance	Ref.
November 4	12:00 p.m.	No. 3 **Ohio State**	**Rutgers**	SHI Stadium • Piscataway, NJ	CBS	**OSU** 35–16	53,703	
November 4	12:00 p.m.	**Nebraska**	**Michigan State**	Spartan Stadium • East Lansing, MI	FS1	**MSU** 20–17	63,134	
November 4	12:00 p.m.	**Wisconsin**	**Indiana**	Memorial Stadium • Bloomington, IN	BTN	**IU** 20–14	45,466	
November 4	3:30 p.m.	No. 9 **Penn State**	**Maryland**	SECU Stadium • College Park, MD (MD-PSU rivalry)	FOX	**PSU** 51–15	51,802	
November 4	3:30 p.m.	**Iowa**	**Northwestern**	Wrigley Field • Chicago, IL	Peacock	**IA** 10–7	–	
November 4	3:30 p.m.	**Illinois**	**Minnesota**	Huntington Bank Stadium • Minneapolis, MN	BTN	**ILL** 27–26	42,906	
November 4	7:30 p.m.	**Purdue**	No. 2 **Michigan**	Michigan Stadium • Ann Arbor, MI	NBC	**MICH** 41–13	110,245	
^{#}Rankings from College Football Playoff. All times are in Eastern Time.

==== Week 11 ====
Date	Time	Visiting team	Home team	Site	TV	Result	Attendance	Ref.
November 11	12:00 p.m.	No. 3 **Michigan**	No. 10 **Penn State**	Beaver Stadium • University Park, PA	FOX	**MICH** 24–15	110,856	
November 11	12:00 p.m.	**Maryland**	**Nebraska**	Memorial Stadium • Lincoln, NE	Peacock	**MD** 13–10	86,830	
November 11	12:00 p.m.	**Indiana**	**Illinois**	Memorial Stadium • Champaign, IL	BTN	**ILL** 48–45 ^{OT}	53,157	
November 11	3:30 p.m.	**Minnesota**	**Purdue**	Ross-Ade Stadium • West Lafayette, IN	NBC	**PUR** 49–30	59,049	
November 11	3:30 p.m.	**Northwestern**	**Wisconsin**	Camp Randall Stadium • Madison, WI	FS1	**NW** 24–10	76,124	
November 11	3:30 p.m.	**Rutgers**	No. 22 **Iowa**	Kinnick Stadium • Iowa City, IA	BTN	**IA** 22–0	69,250	
November 11	7:30 p.m.	**Michigan State**	No. 1 **Ohio State**	Ohio Stadium • Columbus, OH	NBC	**OSU** 38–3	105,137	
^{#}Rankings from College Football Playoff. All times are in Eastern Time.

==== Week 12 ====
Date	Time	Visiting team	Home team	Site	TV	Result	Attendance	Ref.
November 18	12:00 p.m.	Rutgers	Penn State	Beaver Stadium • University Park, PA	FS1	**PSU** 27–6	105,114	
November 18	12:00 p.m.	Michigan	Maryland	SECU Stadium • College Park, MD	FOX	**MICH** 31–24	49,546	
November 18	12:00 p.m.	Michigan State	Indiana	Memorial Stadium • Bloomington, IN (Old Brass Spittoon)	BTN	**MSU** 24–21	40,666	
November 18	12:00 p.m.	Purdue	Northwestern	Ryan Field • Evanston, IL	BTN	**NW** 23–15	23,291	
November 18	3:30 p.m.	Illinois	Iowa	Kinnick Stadium • Iowa City, IA	FS1	**IA** 15–13	69,250	
November 18	4:00 p.m.	Minnesota	Ohio State	Ohio Stadium • Columbus, OH	BTN	**OSU** 37–3	104,019	
November 18	7:30 p.m.	Nebraska	Wisconsin	Camp Randall Stadium • Madison, WI (Freedom Trophy)	NBC	**WIS** 24–17 ^{OT}	72,237	
^{#}Rankings from College Football Playoff. All times are in Eastern Time.

==== Week 13 ====
Date	Time	Visiting team	Home team	Site	TV	Result	Attendance	Ref.
November 24	12:00 p.m.	No. 20 **Iowa**	**Nebraska**	Memorial Stadium • Lincoln, NE (Heroes Game)	CBS	**IA** 13–10	86,183	
November 24	7:30 p.m.	No. 11 **Penn State**	**Michigan State**	Ford Field • Detroit, MI (Land Grant Trophy)	NBC	**PSU** 42–0	51,927	
November 25	12:00 p.m.	No. 2 **Ohio State**	No. 3 **Michigan**	Michigan Stadium • Ann Arbor, MI (The Game)	FOX	**MICH** 30–24	110,615	
November 25	12:00 p.m.	**Indiana**	**Purdue**	Ross-Ade Stadium • West Lafayette, IN (Old Oaken Bucket)	BTN	**PUR** 35–31	59,993	
November 25	3:30 p.m.	**Maryland**	**Rutgers**	SHI Stadium • Piscataway, NJ	BTN	**MD** 42–24	47,012	
November 25	3:30 p.m.	**Northwestern**	**Illinois**	Memorial Stadium • Champaign, IL (Land of Lincoln Trophy)	BTN	**NW** 45–43	42,310	
November 25	3:30 p.m.	**Wisconsin**	**Minnesota**	Huntington Bank Stadium • Minneapolis, MN (Paul Bunyan's Axe)	FS1	**WIS** 28–14	48,119	
^{#}Rankings from College Football Playoff. All times are in Eastern Time.

==== Big Ten Championship Game ====
Date	Time	Visiting team	Home team	Site	TV	Result	Attendance	Ref.
December 2	8:00 p.m.	No. 2 **Michigan**	No. 16 **Iowa**	Lucas Oil Stadium • Indianapolis, IN (Big Ten Championship Game)	FOX	**MICH** 26–0	67,842	
^{#}Rankings from College Football Playoff. All times are in Eastern Time.

== Postseason ==
=== Bowl games ===
For the 2020–2025 bowl cycle, The Big Ten will have annually eight appearances in the following bowls: Rose Bowl (unless they are selected for playoffs filled by a Pac-12 team if champion is in the playoffs), Citrus Bowl, Guaranteed Rate Bowl, Las Vegas Bowl, Music City Bowl, Pinstripe Bowl, Quick Lane Bowl, and Outback Bowl. The Big Ten teams will go to a New Year's Six bowl if a team finishes higher than the champions of Power Five conferences in the final College Football Playoff rankings. The Big Ten champion is also eligible for the College Football Playoff if it is among the top four teams in the final CFP ranking.

Legend
Big Ten win
Big Ten loss

Bowl game	Date	Site	Television	Time (EST)	Big Ten team	Opponent	Score	Attendance	Ref.
Las Vegas Bowl	December 23, 2023	Allegiant Stadium • Paradise, NV	ABC	7:30 PM	Northwestern	Utah	14–7	20,897	
Quick Lane Bowl	December 26, 2023	Ford Field • Detroit, MI	ESPN	2:00 PM	Minnesota	Bowling Green	30–24	28,521	
Pinstripe Bowl	December 28, 2023	Yankee Stadium • Bronx, NY	ESPN	2:15 PM	Rutgers	Miami (FL)	31–24	35,314	
Music City Bowl	December 30, 2023	Nissan Stadium • Nashville, TN	ABC	2:00 PM	Maryland	Auburn	31–13	50,088	
ReliaQuest Bowl	January 1, 2024	Raymond James Stadium • Tampa, FL	ESPN2	12:00 PM	Wisconsin	#13 LSU	31–35	31,424	
Citrus Bowl	January 1, 2024	Camping World Stadium • Orlando, FL	ABC	1:00 PM	#17 Iowa	#21 Tennessee	0–35	43,861	
New Year's Six Bowls
Cotton Bowl	December 29, 2023	AT&T Stadium • Arlington, TX	ESPN	7:00 PM	#7 Ohio State	#9 Missouri	3–14	70,114	
Peach Bowl	December 30, 2023	Mercedes-Benz Stadium • Atlanta, GA	ESPN	12:00 PM	#10 Penn State	#11 Mississippi	25–38	71,230	
College Football Playoff
Rose Bowl (semifinal)	January 1, 2024	Rose Bowl • Pasadena, CA	ESPN	5:00 PM	#1 Michigan	#4 Alabama	27–20 (OT)	96,371	
CFP National Championship Game	January 8, 2024	NRG Stadium • Houston, TX	ESPN	7:30 PM	#1 Michigan	#2 Washington	34–13	72,808	

Rankings are from College Football Playoff Rankings. All times Eastern Time Zone.

== Big Ten records vs other conferences ==
2023–2024 records against non-conference foes

Power Five Conferences	Record
ACC	4–4
Big 12	2–1
Notre Dame	1–0
Pac-12	0–3
SEC	0–0
Power Five Total	7–8
Group of Five Conferences	Record
American	3–0
C–USA	3–0
Independents (Excluding Notre Dame)	1–0
MAC	8–0
Mountain West	2–1
Sun Belt	2–0
Other FBS Total	19–1
FCS Opponents	Record
Football Championship Subdivision	7–0
Total Non-Conference Record	33–9

Post Season

Power Five Conferences	Record
ACC	1–0
Big 12	0–0
Notre Dame	0–0
Pac-12	2–0
SEC	2–4
Power Five Total	5–4
Group of Five Conferences	Record
American	0–0
C–USA	0–0
Independents (Excluding Notre Dame)	0–0
MAC	1–0
Mountain West	0–0
Sun Belt	0–0
Other FBS Total	1–0
Total Bowl Record	6–4

== Awards and honors ==
=== Player of the week honors ===
Week	Offensive			Defensive			Special Teams			Freshman		
Week	Player	Position	Team	Player	Position	Team	Player	Position	Team	Player	Position	Team
Week 1 (Sept. 5)	Drew Allar	QB	PSU	Miles Scott	DB	ILL	Dragan Kesich	K	MINN	Dillon Thieneman	DB	PUR
Week 1 (Sept. 5)	Drew Allar	QB	PSU	Tyler Nubin	S	MINN	Dragan Kesich	K	MINN	Dillon Thieneman	DB	PUR
Week 2 (Sept. 11)	Noah Kim	QB	MSU	Sebastian Castro	DB	IA	Jai Patel	K	RUT	Darius Taylor	RB	MINN
Week 3 (Sept. 18)	Kyle Monangai	RB	RUT	Hunter Wohler	S	WIS	Braedan Wisloski	WR	MD	Darius Taylor	RB	MINN
Week 4 (Sept. 25)	Bryce Kirtz	WR	NW	Lathan Ransom	S	OSU	Nathanial Vakos	K	WIS	Darius Taylor	RB	MINN
Week 5 (Oct. 2)	Taulia Tagovailoa	QB	MD	Nick Jackson	LB	IA	Cooper DeJean	DB	IA	Zach Evans	RB	MINN
Week 5 (Oct. 2)	Taulia Tagovailoa	QB	MD	Josaiah Stewart	DE	MICH	Cooper DeJean	DB	IA	Zach Evans	RB	MINN
Week 6 (Oct. 9)	Marvin Harrison Jr.	WR	OSU	Josh Proctor	S	OSU	Tory Taylor	P	IA	Dillon Thieneman	DB	PUR
Week 7 (Oct. 16)	J. J. McCarthy	QB	MICH	Seth Coleman	LB	ILL	Tory Taylor	P	IA	Kaden Feagin	RB	ILL
Week 7 (Oct. 16)	J. J. McCarthy	QB	MICH	Seth Coleman	LB	ILL	Daequan Hardy	CB	PSU	Kaden Feagin	RB	ILL
Week 8 (Oct. 23)	J. J. McCarthy	QB	MICH	Tyler Nubin	S	MIN	Dragan Kesich	K	MIN	Braedyn Locke	QB	WIS
Week 8 (Oct. 23)	Marvin Harrison Jr.	WR	OSU	Tyler Nubin	S	MIN	Dragan Kesich	K	MIN	Braedyn Locke	QB	WIS
Week 9 (Oct. 30)	Jordan Nubin	RB	MIN	Aidan Hubbard	DL	NW	Quinton Newsome	CB	NEB	Dillon Thieneman	DB	PUR
Week 10 (Nov. 6)	Isaiah Williams	WR	ILL	Aaron Casey	LB	IU	Drew Stevens	K	IA	Kaden Feagin	RB	ILL
Week 11 (Nov. 13)	John Paddock	QB	ILL	Tarheeb Still	DB	MD	Jack Howes	K	MD	Dillon Thieneman	DB	PUR
Week 12 (Nov. 20)	Maliq Carr	TE	MSU	Mike Sainristil	DB	MICH	Tory Taylor	P	IA	Katin Houser	QB	MSU
Week 13 (Nov. 27)	Taulia Tagovailoa	QB	MD	Aaron Casey	LB	IU	James Turner	K	MICH	Dillon Thieneman	DB	PUR

=== Big Ten individual awards ===
The following individuals won the conference's annual player and coach awards:

Award	Player	School
Most Valuable Player	Marvin Harrison Jr.	Ohio State
Graham–George Offensive Player of the Year	Marvin Harrison Jr.	Ohio State
Griese–Brees Quarterback of the Year	J. J. McCarthy	Michigan
Richter–Howard Receiver of the Year	Marvin Harrison Jr.	Ohio State
Ameche–Dayne Running Back of the Year	Blake Corum	Michigan
Kwalick–Clark Tight End of the Year	Cade Stover	Ohio State
Rimington–Pace Offensive Lineman of the Year	Olu Fashanu	Penn State
Nagurski–Woodson Defensive Player of the Year	Johnny Newton	Illinois
Smith–Brown Defensive Lineman of the Year	Johnny Newton	Illinois
Butkus–Fitzgerald Linebacker of the Year	Tommy Eichenberg	Ohio State
Tatum–Woodson Defensive Back of the Year	Cooper DeJean	Iowa
Thompson–Randle El Freshman of the Year	Dillon Thieneman	Purdue
Bakken–Andersen Kicker of the Year	Dragan Kesich	Minnesota
Eddleman–Fields Punter of the Year	Tory Taylor	Iowa
Rodgers–Dwight Return Specialist of the Year	Cooper DeJean	Iowa
Hayes–Schembechler Coach of the Year	David Braun	Northwestern
Dave McClain Coach of the Year	David Braun	Northwestern
Dungy–Thompson Humanitarian Award	Dick Butkus	Illinois
Ford–Kinnick Leadership Award	Richard Coachys	Indiana

=== All-Conference Teams ===
2023 Big Ten All-Conference Teams and Awards

Position	Player	Team
First Team Offense (Coaches)
QB	J. J. McCarthy	Michigan
RB	Blake Corum	Michigan
RB	TreVeyon Henderson	Ohio State
WR	Isaiah Williams	Illinois
WR	Marvin Harrison Jr.	Ohio State
TE	Colston Loveland	Michigan
C	Drake Nugent	Michigan
OG	Zak Zinter	Michigan
OG	Donovan Jackson	Ohio State
OT	LaDarius Henderson	Michigan
OT	Olumuyiwa Fashanu	Penn State
First Team Defense (Coaches)
DL	Johnny Newton	Illinois
DL	Mason Graham	Michigan
DL	JT Tuimoloau	Ohio State
DL	Chop Robinson	Penn State
LB	Jay Higgins	Iowa
LB	Tommy Eichenberg	Ohio State
LB	Abdul Carter	Penn State
DB	Cooper DeJean	Iowa
DB	Will Johnson	Michigan
DB	Tyler Nubin	Minnesota
DB	Denzel Burke	Ohio State
First Team Special Teams (Coaches)
PK	Dragan Kesich	Minnesota
P	Tory Taylor	Iowa
RS	Cooper DeJean	Iowa

Position	Player	Team
Second Team Offense (Coaches)
QB	Taulia Tagovailoa	Maryland
RB	Kaytron Allen	Penn State
RB	Kyle Monangai	Rutgers
WR	Roman Wilson	Michigan
WR	Daniel Jackson	Minnesota
WR	Deion Burks	Purdue
TE	Cade Stover	Ohio State
C	Hunter Nourzad	Penn State
OG	Trevor Keegan	Michigan
OG	Matthew Jones	Ohio State
OT	Karsen Barnhart	Michigan
OT	Aireontae Ersery	Minnesota
Second Team Defense (Coaches)
DL	Kenneth Grant	Michigan
DL	Kris Jenkins	Michigan
DL	Adisa Isaac	Penn State
DL	Nic Scourton	Purdue
LB	Aaron Casey	Indiana
LB	Junior Colson	Michigan
LB	Bryce Gallagher	Northwestern
DB	Tarheeb Still	Maryland
DB	Mike Sainristil	Michigan
DB	Dillon Thieneman	Purdue
DB	Kalen King	Penn State
Second Team Special Teams (Coaches)
PK	James Turner	Michigan
PK	Jayden Fielding	Ohio State
P	Ryan Eckley	Michigan State
RS	Daequan Hardy	Penn State

Position	Player	Team
Third Team Offense (Coaches)
QB	Kyle McCord	Ohio State
RB	Nicholas Singleton	Penn State
RB	Braelon Allen	Wisconsin
WR	Emeka Egbuka	Ohio State
WR	Will Pauling	Wisconsin
TE	Tyler Warren	Penn State
C	Logan Jones	Iowa
OG	Connor Colby	Iowa
OG	Nick DeJong	Iowa
OG	Josh Priebe	Northwestern
OT	Delmar Glaze	Maryland
OT	Josh Fryar	Ohio State
Third Team Defense (Coaches)
DL	Mike Hall Jr.	Ohio State
DL	Jack Sawyer	Ohio State
DL	Tyleik Williams	Ohio State
DL	Dani Dennis-Sutton	Penn State
LB	Ruben Hyppolite II	Maryland
LB	Michael Barrett	Michigan
LB	Luke Reimer	Nebraska
DB	Rod Moore	Michigan
DB	Johnny Dixon	Penn State
DB	Daequan Hardy	Penn State
DB	Hunter Wohler	Wisconsin
Third Team Special Teams (Coaches)
PK	Drew Stevens	Iowa
PK	Alex Felkins	Penn State
P	Tommy Doman	Michigan
RS	Tyrone Tracy Jr.	Purdue

Coaches Honorable Mention: ILLINOIS: Isaiah Adams, Julian Pearl, Josh Gesky, Josh Kreutz, Kaden Feagin, John Paddock, Caleb Griffin, Xavier Scott, Dylan Rosiek, Seth Coleman, Keith Randolph Jr.; INDIANA: Zach Carpenter, Donaven McCulley, Jaylin Lucas, James Evans, Andre Carter; IOWA: Mason Richman, Rusty Feth, Erick All, Leshon Williams, Sebastian Castro, Quinn Schulte, Nick Jackson, Logan Lee, Joe Evans, Yahya Black; MARYLAND: Corey Bullock, Roman Hemby, Kaden Prather, Jeshaun Jones, Beau Brade, Ja'Quan Sheppard, Jaishawn Barham, Quashon Fuller; MICHIGAN : A.J. Barner, Semaj Morgan, Makari Paige, Josh Wallace, Braiden McGregor, Josaiah Stewart, Jaylen Harrell, Derrick Moore; MICHIGAN STATE: J.D. Duplain, Nick Samac, Nate Carter, Jonathan Kim, Jaden Mangham, Cal Haladay, Simeon Barrow; MINNESOTA: Quinn Carroll, Nathan Boe, Brevyn Spann-Ford, Darius Taylor, Justin Walley; NEBRASKA: Isaac Gifford, Quinton Newsome, Tommi Hill, Omar Brown, Nash Hutmacher, Ty Robinson; NORTHWESTERN: A. J. Henning, Jack Olsen, Rod Heard, Xander Mueller; OHIO STATE: Davison Igbinosun, Josh Proctor, Lathan Ransom, Sonny Styles, Steele Chambers, Ty Hamilton; PENN STATE: Caedan Wallace, JB Nelson, Sal Wormley, Theo Johnson, KeAndre Lambert-Smith, Drew Allar, Nicholas Singleton, Riley Thompson, Jaylen Reed, Kevin Winston Jr., Kobe King, Curtis Jacobs; PURDUE: Gus Hartwig, Tyrone Tracy Jr., Devin Mockobee, Sanoussi Kane, Kydran Jenkins, Isaiah Nichols; RUTGERS: Hollin Pierce, Jai Patel, Max Melton, Mohamed Toure, Aaron Lewis; WISCONSIN: Tanor Bortolini, Ricardo Hallman.

Position	Player	Team
First Team Offense (Media)
QB	J. J. McCarthy	Michigan
RB	Blake Corum	Michigan
RB	TreVeyon Henderson	Ohio State
WR	Isaiah Williams	Illinois
WR	Marvin Harrison Jr.	Ohio State
TE	Cade Stover	Ohio State
C	Drake Nugent	Michigan
OG	Zak Zinter	Michigan
OG	Donovan Jackson	Ohio State
OT	Josh Fryar	Ohio State
OT	Olu Fashanu	Penn State
First Team Defense (Media)
DL	Johnny Newton	Illinois
DL	JT Tuimoloau	Ohio State
DL	Adisa Isaac	Penn State
DL	Chop Robinson	Penn State
LB	Jay Higgins	Iowa
LB	Aaron Casey	Indiana
LB	Tommy Eichenberg	Ohio State
DB	Cooper DeJean	Iowa
DB	Will Johnson	Michigan
DB	Mike Sainristil	Michigan
DB	Tyler Nubin	Minnesota
First Team Special Teams (Media)
PK	Dragan Kesich	Minnesota
P	Tory Taylor	Iowa
RS	Cooper DeJean	Iowa

Position	Player	Team
Second Team Offense (Media)
QB	Taulia Tagovailoa	Maryland
RB	Kyle Monangai	Rutgers
RB	Braelon Allen	Wisconsin
WR	Roman Wilson	Michigan
WR	Daniel Jackson	Minnesota
TE	Colston Loveland	Michigan
C	Hunter Nourzad	Penn State
OG	Trevor Keegan	Michigan
OG	Matthew Jones	Ohio State
OT	LaDarius Henderson	Michigan
OT	Aireontae Ersery	Minnesota
Second Team Defense (Media)
DL	Kris Jenkins	Michigan
DL	Jack Sawyer	Ohio State
DL	Tyleik Williams	Ohio State
DL	Nic Scourton	Purdue
LB	Junior Colson	Michigan
LB	Bryce Gallagher	Northwestern
LB	Abdul Carter	Penn State
DB	Sebastian Castro	Iowa
DB	Denzel Burke	Ohio State
DB	Kalen King	Penn State
DB	Hunter Wohler	Wisconsin
Second Team Special Teams (Media)
PK	Alex Felkins	Penn State
P	Ryan Eckley	Michigan State
RS	Daequan Hardy	Penn State

Position	Player	Team
Third Team Offense (Media)
QB	Kyle McCord	Ohio State
RB	Kaytron Allen	Penn State
RB	Nicholas Singleton	Penn State
WR	Tai Felton	Maryland
WR	Jeshaun Jones	Maryland
TE	Corey Dyches	Maryland
C	Tanor Bortolini	Wisconsin
OG	Connor Colby	Iowa
OG	Josh Priebe	Northwestern
OT	Delmar Glaze	Maryland
OT	Karsen Barnhart	Michigan
Third Team Defense (Media)
DL	Keith Randolph Jr.	Illinois
DL	Joe Evans	Iowa
DL	Mason Graham	Michigan
DL	Kenneth Grant	Michigan
LB	Nick Jackson	Iowa
LB	Xander Mueller	Northwestern
LB	Steele Chambers	Ohio State
DB	Tarheeb Still	Maryland
DB	Josh Proctor	Ohio State
DB	Dillon Thieneman	Purdue
DB	Ricardo Hallman	Wisconsin
Third Team Special Teams (Media)
PK	Jai Patel	Rutgers
P	James Evans	Indiana
RS	Jaylin Lucas	Indiana

Media Honorable Mention: ILLINOIS: Isaiah Adams, Josh Gesky, Josh Kreutz, Julian Pearl, Zy Crisler, Dylan Rosiek, Seth Coleman, Xavier Scott, Caleb Griffin, Hugh Robertson; INDIANA: Donaven McCulley, Zach Carpenter, Andre Carter, Kobee Minor; IOWA: Gennings Dunker, Leshon Williams, Logan Jones, Mason Richman, Nick DeJong, Rusty Feth, Deontae Craig, Logan Lee, Quinn Schulte, Yahya Black, Drew Stevens; MARYLAND: Corey Bullock, Gottlieb Ayedze, Kaden Prather, Beau Brade, Ruben Hyppolite II, Braeden Wisloski; MICHIGAN: AJ Barner, Cornelius Johnson, Braiden McGregor, Derrick Moore, Jaylen Harrell, Josh Wallace, Michael Barrett, Rod Moore, James Turner, Semaj Morgan, Tommy Doman; MICHIGAN STATE: J.D. Duplain, Nate Carter, Nick Samac, Aaron Brule, Cal Haladay, Jaden Mangham, Simeon Barrow, Jonathan Kim; MINNESOTA: Brevyn Spann-Ford, Darius Taylor, Quinn Carroll, Danny Striggow, Jah Joyner, Justin Walley, Kyler Baugh, Mark Crawford; NEBRASKA: Ben Scott, Bryce Benhart, Isaac Gifford, Jimari Butler, Luke Reimer, Nash Hutmacher, Omar Brown, Quinton Newsome, Tommi Hill, Ty Robinson; NORTHWESTERN: A. J. Henning, Bryce Kirt, Aidan Hubbard, Coco Azema, Rod Heard, Jack Olsen; OHIO STATE: Emeka Egbuka, Davison Igbinosun, Lathan Ransom, Mike Hall Jr., Sonny Styles, Jayden Fielding; PENN STATE: Caedan Wallace, Drew Allar, JB Nelson, KeAndre Lambert-Smith, Olaivavega Ioane, Sal Wormley, Theo Johnson, Tyler Warren, Daequan Hardy, Dani Dennis-Sutton, Dvon Ellies, Jaylen Reed, Johnny Dixon, Kevin Winston Jr., Kobe King, Zane Durant, Nicholas Singleton, Riley Thompson; PURDUE: Deion Burks, Devin Mockobee, Gus Hartwig, Hudson Card, Marcus Mbow, Tyrone Tracy Jr., Kydran Jenkins, Sanoussi Kane; RUTGERS: Bryan Felter, Gus Zilinskas, Hollin Pierce, Johnny Langan, Aaron Lewis, Deion Jennings, Flip Dixon, Max Melton, Mayan Ahanotu, Mohamed Toure, Robert Longerbeam; WISCONSIN: Will Pauling, Nathanial Vakos.

== Home attendance ==
Team	Stadium	Capacity	Game 1	Game 2	Game 3	Game 4	Game 5	Game 6	Game 7	Game 8	Total	Average	% of Capacity
Illinois	Memorial Stadium	60,670	48,898	49,099†	53,512	46,703	54,205	53,157	42,310	–	347,884	49,698	81.9%
Indiana	Memorial Stadium	52,626	50,050†	42,775	44,968	43,611	45,466	40,666	–	–	267,536	44,589	84.7%
Iowa	Kinnick Stadium	69,250	**69,250**†	**69,250**	**69,250**	**69,250**	**69,250**	**69,250**	**69,250**	–	484,750	69,250	100.0%
Maryland	SECU Stadium	51,802	37,241	32,804	37,041	38,181	35,580	**51,802**†	49,546	–	282,195	40,314	77.8%
Michigan	Michigan Stadium	107,601	**109,480**	**109,482**	**109,955**	**109,756**	**110,264**	**110,245**	**110,615**†	–	769,797	109,971	102.2%
Michigan State	Spartan Stadium	75,005	73,216	70,049	70,528	70,131	74,206†	63,134	–	–	421,264	70,211	93.6%
Minnesota	Huntington Bank Stadium	50,805	**53,629**†	48,101	46,843	**52,179**	47,392	42,906	48,119	–	339,169	48,453	95.4%
Nebraska	Memorial Stadium	85,458	**86,875**	**87,115**	**87,134**†	**86,769**	**86,709**	**86,830**	**86,183**	–	607,615	86,802	101.6%
Northwestern	Ryan Field	47,130	14,851	20,148	25,064	22,160	19,286	23,291	–	–	124,800	20,800	44.1%
Ohio State	Ohio Stadium	102,780	**102,897**	100,217	**104,974**	**105,506**†	**105,137**	**105,114**	–	–	623,845	103,974	101.2%
Penn State	Beaver Stadium	106,572	**110,747**	**108,575**	**110,830**	105,533	**107,209**	**110,856**†	105,114	–	758,864	108,409	101.7%
Purdue	Ross–Ade Stadium	61,441	54,898	**61,441**†	55,529	59,510	57,319	59,049	59,993	–	407,739	58,248	94.8%
Rutgers	SHI Stadium	52,454	**53,026**	45,317	**52,657**	40,165	**52,879**	**53,703**†	47,012	–	344,759	49,251	93.9%
Wisconsin	Camp Randall Stadium	75,822	**76,224**†	75,610	74,885	**76,205**	**76,453**	**76,124**	72,237	–	527,738	75,391	99.4%

Bold – At or Exceed capacity
†Season High

== 2024 NFL draft ==
Team	Round 1	Round 2	Round 3	Round 4	Round 5	Round 6	Round 7	Total
Illinois	–	1	2	–	–	1	–	4
Indiana	–	–	–	–	–	–	–	–
Iowa	–	1	–	2	–	1	–	4
Maryland	–	–	1	–	1	–	–	2
Michigan	1	2	4	1	1	–	4	13
Michigan State	–	–	–	–	–	–	1	1
Minnesota	–	1	–	–	–	–	–	1
Nebraska	–	–	–	–	–	–	–	–
Northwestern	–	–	–	–	–	–	–	–
Ohio State	1	1	–	1	1	–	–	4
Penn State	2	–	2	1	1	2	–	8
Purdue	–	–	–	–	1	–	1	2
Rutgers	–	1	–	–	–	–	–	1
Wisconsin	–	–	–	2	–	–	–	2

The following list includes all Big Ten players who were drafted in the 2024 NFL draft

*	compensatory selection
×	2020 Resolution JC-2A selection

Rnd.	Pick	Team	Player	Pos.	College	Notes
1	4	Arizona Cardinals	Marvin Harrison Jr.	WR	Ohio State	
1	10	Minnesota Vikings	J. J. McCarthy	QB	Michigan	from NY Jets
1	11	New York Jets	Olu Fashanu	T	Penn State	from Minnesota
1	21	Miami Dolphins	Chop Robinson	DE	Penn State	
2	36	Washington Commanders	Johnny Newton	DT	Illinois	
2	40	Philadelphia Eagles	Cooper DeJean	CB	Iowa	from Chicago via Washington (Note: No. 40: Chicago → Washington (PD). Chicago traded a second-round selection to Washington in exchange for defensive end Montez Sweat.)
2	43	Arizona Cardinals	Max Melton	CB	Rutgers	from Atlanta
2	47	New York Giants	Tyler Nubin	S	Minnesota	from Seattle (Note: No. 47: Seattle → NY Giants (PD). Seattle traded a second-round selection and a 2025 fifth-round selection to New York in exchange for defensive tackle Leonard Williams.)
2	49	Cincinnati Bengals	Kris Jenkins	DT	Michigan	
2	50	Washington Commanders	Mike Sainristil	CB	Michigan	from New Orleans via Philadelphia (Note: No. 50: New Orleans → Philadelphia (PD). New Orleans traded a second-round selection, 2022 first, third, and seventh-round selections (18th, 101st, and 237th overall), and a 2023 first-round selection (10th overall) to Philadelphia in exchange for two 2022 first-round selections (16th and 19th overall) and a 2023 sixth-round selection (194th overall).)
2	54	Cleveland Browns	Mike Hall Jr.	DT	Ohio State	
3	68	New England Patriots	Caedan Wallace	T	Penn State	
3	69	Los Angeles Chargers	Junior Colson	LB	Michigan	
3	71	Arizona Cardinals	Isaiah Adams	T	Illinois	from Tennessee (Note: No. 71: Tennessee → Arizona (PD). Tennessee traded a 2024 third-round selection (71st), and 2023 second and third-round selections (41st and 72nd) to Arizona in exchange for 2023 second and third-round selections (33rd and 81st))
3	77	Las Vegas Raiders	Delmar Glaze	T	Maryland	
3	82	Arizona Cardinals	Tip Reiman	TE	Illinois	from Indianapolis
3	83	Los Angeles Rams	Blake Corum	RB	Michigan	
3	84	Pittsburgh Steelers	Roman Wilson	WR	Michigan	
3	85	Cleveland Browns	Zak Zinter	G	Michigan	
3	93	Baltimore Ravens	Adisa Isaac	DE	Penn State	
4	107	New York Giants	Theo Johnson	TE	Penn State	
4	115	Cincinnati Bengals	Erick All	TE	Iowa	
4	117	Indianapolis Colts	Tanor Bortolini	C	Wisconsin	
4	121	Seattle Seahawks	A. J. Barner	TE	Michigan	from Miami via Denver (Note: No. 121: Miami → Denver (PD). Miami traded a fourth-round selection, a 2023 first-round selection, and running back Chase Edmonds to Denver in exchange for Bradley Chubb and a 2025 fifth-round selection.)
4	122	Chicago Bears	Tory Taylor	P	Iowa	from Philadelphia (Note: No. 122: Philadelphia → Chicago (PD). Philadelphia traded a fourth-round selection and a 2023 first-round selection to Chicago in exchange for a 2023 first-round selection.)
4	123	Houston Texans	Cade Stover	TE	Ohio State	from Cleveland via Houston and Philadelphia (Note: No. 123: Cleveland → Houston (PD). See Round 1: Cleveland → Houston.)
4*	134	New York Jets	Braelon Allen	RB	Wisconsin	from Baltimore (Note: No. 134: Baltimore → NY Jets (PD). See Round 4: NY Jets → Baltimore.)
5	137	Los Angeles Chargers	Tarheeb Still	CB	Maryland	from New England (Note: No. 137: New England → LA Chargers (D). See Round 2: New England → LA Chargers.)
5	148	Las Vegas Raiders	Tommy Eichenberg	LB	Ohio State	
5	159	Kansas City Chiefs	Hunter Nourzad	C	Penn State	from Dallas (Note: No. 159: Dallas → Kansas City (PD). Dallas traded a fifth-round selection to Kansas City in exchange for a 2023 sixth-round selection (No. 178).)
5	166	New York Giants	Tyrone Tracy Jr.	RB	Purdue	from San Francisco via Carolina (Note: No. 166: San Francisco → Carolina → NY Giants. Multiple trades: San Francisco → Carolina (PD). Carolina received a fifth-round selection and as well as second, third, and fourth-round selections in the 2023 draft in exchange for running back Christian McCaffrey. Carolina → NY Giants (PD). See Round 2: NY Giants → Carolina.)
5*	172	Philadelphia Eagles	Trevor Keegan	G	Michigan	
6	178	Pittsburgh Steelers	Logan Lee	DT	Iowa	from Arizona via Carolina (Note: No. 178: Arizona → Carolina → Pittsburgh. Multiple trades: Arizona → Carolina (PD). Arizona traded a sixth-round selection and a 2025 seventh-round selection to Carolina in exchange for wide receiver Robbie Anderson. Carolina → Pittsburgh (PD). Carolina traded a sixth-round selection and CB Donte Jackson to Pittsburgh in exchange for a seventh-round selection and WR Diontae Johnson.)
6	187	Atlanta Falcons	Casey Washington	WR	Illinois	
6*	219	Buffalo Bills	Daequan Hardy	CB	Penn State	from Green Bay
7	228	Baltimore Ravens	Nick Samac	C	Michigan State	from NY Jets (Note: No. 228: NY Jets → Baltimore (PD). Baltimore traded safety Chuck Clark to New York in exchange for a seventh-round selection.)
7	240	Carolina Panthers	Michael Barrett	LB	Michigan	from Pittsburgh (Note: No. 240: Pittsburgh → Carolina (PD). See Round 6: Carolina → Pittsburgh.)
7	249	Houston Texans	LaDarius Henderson	T	Michigan	from Detroit
7	252	Tennessee Titans	Jaylen Harrell	DE	Michigan	from Kansas City (Note: No. 252: Kansas City → Tennessee (PD). See Round 7: Tennessee → Kansas City.)
7*	253	Los Angeles Chargers	Cornelius Johnson	WR	Michigan	
7*	255	Green Bay Packers	Kalen King	CB	Penn State	

Trades In the explanations below, (PD) indicates trades completed prior to the start of the draft (i.e. Pre-Draft), while (D) denotes trades that took place during the 2022 draft.

== Head coaches ==
Through games of Jan. 8, 2024

Team	Head coach	Years at school	Overall record	Record at school	B1G record
Illinois	Bret Bielema (Note: Bret Bielema coached in the Big Ten from 2006 through 2012 at Wisconsin, going 37–19 in Big Ten play and winning three Big Ten championships.)	3	115–77 (.599)	18–19 (.486)	49–34 (.590)
Indiana	Tom Allen (Note: Tom Allen was hired to replace Kevin Wilson in December 2016 at Indiana and coached the Hoosiers in their 2016 bowl game, going 0–1.)	7	33–49 (.402)	33–49 (.402)	18–43 (.295)
Iowa	Kirk Ferentz	25	208–140 (.598)	196–119 (.622)	122–85 (.589)
Maryland	Mike Locksley (Note: Mike Locksley served as interim head coach at Maryland in 2015 and coached for six games, going 1–5.)	5	31–59 (.344)	29–33 (.468)	15–32 (.319)
Michigan	Jim Harbaugh	9	141–52 (.731)	83–25 (.769)	57–17 (.770)
Michigan	Jesse Minter (interim) (Note: Jesse Minter served as interim head coach at Michigan for the first game of the 2023 season while Jim Harbaugh served a three-game suspension.)	1	1–0 (1.000)	1–0 (1.000)	0–0 (–)
Michigan	Jay Harbaugh (interim) (Note: Jay Harbaugh served as interim head coach at Michigan for the first half of the second game of the 2023 season while Jim Harbaugh served a three-game suspension.)	1	1–0 (1.000)	1–0 (1.000)	0–0 (–)
Michigan	Mike Hart (interim) (Note: Jay Harbaugh served as interim head coach at Michigan for the second half of the second game of the 2023 season while Jim Harbaugh served a three-game suspension.)	1	1–0 (1.000)	1–0 (1.000)	0–0 (–)
Michigan	Sherrone Moore (interim) (Note: Sherrone Moore served as interim head coach at Michigan for the third game of the 2023 season while Jim Harbaugh served a three-game suspension.) (Note: Moore also served as interim coach after Jim Harbaugh was suspended from the sidelines by the Big Ten for a sign-stealing scandal.)	1	4–0 (1.000)	4–0 (1.000)	3–0 (1.000)
Michigan State	Mel Tucker	4	25–21 (.543)	20–14 (.588)	12–13 (.480)
Michigan State	Harlon Barnett (interim) (Note: Mel Tucker was relieved as head coach on September 10, 2023, under investigation for sexual misconduct.) (Note: Harlon Bennett was named interim head coach on September 10, 2023.)	1	2–8 (.200)	2–8 (.200)	2–7 (.222)
Minnesota	P. J. Fleck	7	80–56 (.588)	50–34 (.595)	29–32 (.475)
Nebraska	Matt Rhule	1	52–50 (.510)	5–7 (.417)	3–6 (.333)
Northwestern	David Braun (interim) (Note: Pat Fitzgerald was relieved as head coach on July 10, 2023, after allegations of hazing within the Wildcat football program surfaced.) (Note: David Braun was named interim head coach on July 14, 2023.)	1	8–5 (.615)	8–5 (.615)	5–4 (.556)
Ohio State	Ryan Day (Note: Ryan Day served as interim head coach at Ohio State for the first three games of the 2018 season while Urban Meyer served a three-game suspension and went 3–0.)	5	56–8 (.875)	56–8 (.875)	39–3 (.929)
Penn State	James Franklin	10	112–54 (.675)	88–39 (.693)	56–32 (.636)
Purdue	Ryan Walters	1	4–8 (.333)	4–8 (.333)	3–6 (.333)
Rutgers	Greg Schiano (Note: Greg Schiano served as head coach at Rutgers from 2001 through 2011 then left for the NFL. Following the conclusion of the 2019 season, Schiano returned to Rutgers for his second stint as head coach. The Scarlet Knights competed in the Big East Conference in his previous stay at the school.)	15	87–95 (.478)	87–95 (.478)	9–27 (.250)
Wisconsin	Luke Fickell (Note: Luke Fickell served as interim head coach at Ohio State in 2011, going 6-7 overall and 3-5 in the Big Ten. Fickell took over as coach of Wisconsin for the 2022 Guaranteed Rate Bowl)	1	71–31 (.696)	8–6 (.571)	8–9 (.471)
