= Hunter Nourzad =

American football player (born 2000)

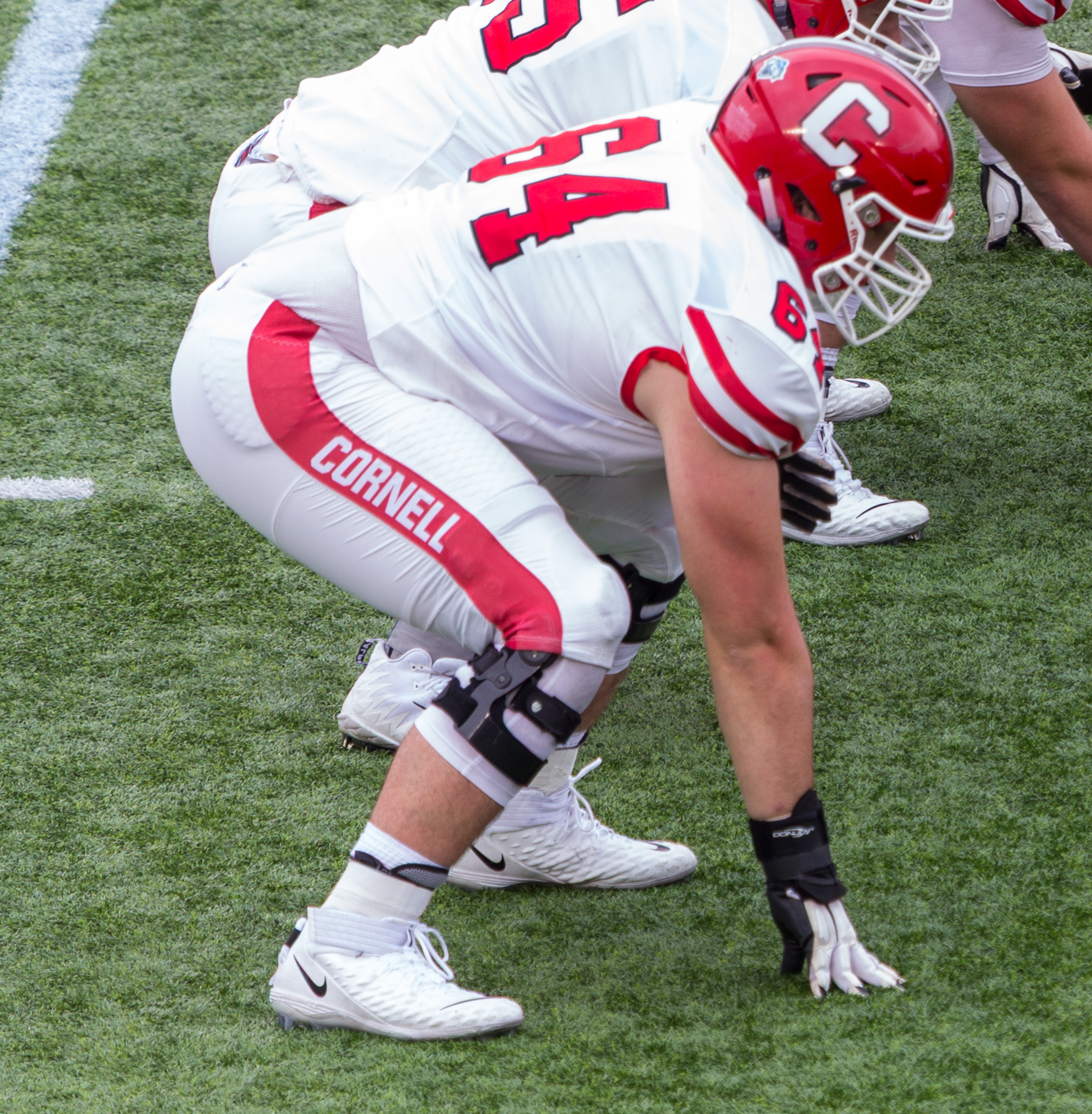
- Nourzad with the Cornell Big Red in 2019

No. 64 – Kansas City Chiefs
- Position: Center
- Roster status: Active

Personal information
- Born: November 26, 2000 (age 25); Marietta, Georgia, U.S.
- Listed height: 6 ft 3 in (1.91 m)
- Listed weight: 317 lb (144 kg)

Career information
- High school: The Walker School (Marietta)
- College: Cornell (2018–2021); Penn State (2022–2023)
- NFL draft: 2024: 5th round, 159th overall pick

Career history
- Kansas City Chiefs (2024–present)

Awards and highlights
- Second team All-Big Ten (2023); Ivy League Offensive Lineman of the Year (2021); First-team All-Ivy League (2021); Second-team All-Ivy League (2019)

Career NFL statistics as of 2025
- Games played: 18
- Games started: 1
- Stats at Pro Football Reference

Hunter Lee Nourzad (born November 26, 2000) is an American professional football center for the Kansas City Chiefs of the National Football League (NFL). He played college football for the Cornell Big Red and Penn State Nittany Lions and was selected by the Chiefs in the fifth round of the 2024 NFL draft.

== Early life ==
From Marietta, Georgia, Nourzad attended The Walker School where he was twice the football team captain and also competed for the lacrosse and track and field teams. He won all-region honors in shot put and was all-state, a three-time all-region honoree and the regional lineman of the year with the football team. He received little attention as a recruit and committed to play college football for the FCS Cornell Big Red, being an unranked prospect. Nourzad is Iranian.

== College career ==
In Nourzad's first season, 2018, he saw no playing time. The following year, he earned a starting role at right tackle and was named second-team All-Ivy League. After the 2020 season was not played due to the COVID-19 pandemic, Nourzad returned as a starter for the 2021 season. He started all 10 games and helped Cornell place fifth nationally for fewest quarterback sacks allowed per game while also setting the program record for fewest sacks. He was selected first-team all-conference, the Ivy League Offensive Lineman of the Year by Phil Steele, and was a second-team choice for the All-America team as selected by the American Football Coaches Association (AFCA).

Nourzad transferred to the Penn State Nittany Lions in 2022. He changed his position to guard at Penn State, having previously been a tackle at Cornell. He played 11 games, eight as a starter, and was named honorable mention All-Big Ten Conference in the 2022 season. He returned for a final season in 2023 and moved to center. He was selected a second-team All-Big Ten selection in 2023. He was invited to the East–West Shrine Bowl and participated at the NFL Scouting Combine after the season.

== Professional career ==
Pre-draft measurables
Height	Weight	Arm length	Hand span	Wingspan	Bench press
6 ft 3 1/8 in (1.91 m)	317 lb (144 kg)	33 1/8 in (0.84 m)	10 3/4 in (0.27 m)	6 ft 7 3/8 in (2.02 m)	27 reps
All values from NFL Combine

Nourzad was selected by the Kansas City Chiefs in the fifth round (159th overall) of the 2024 NFL draft.
