= The Walker School =

Private school in Marietta, Georgia, United States

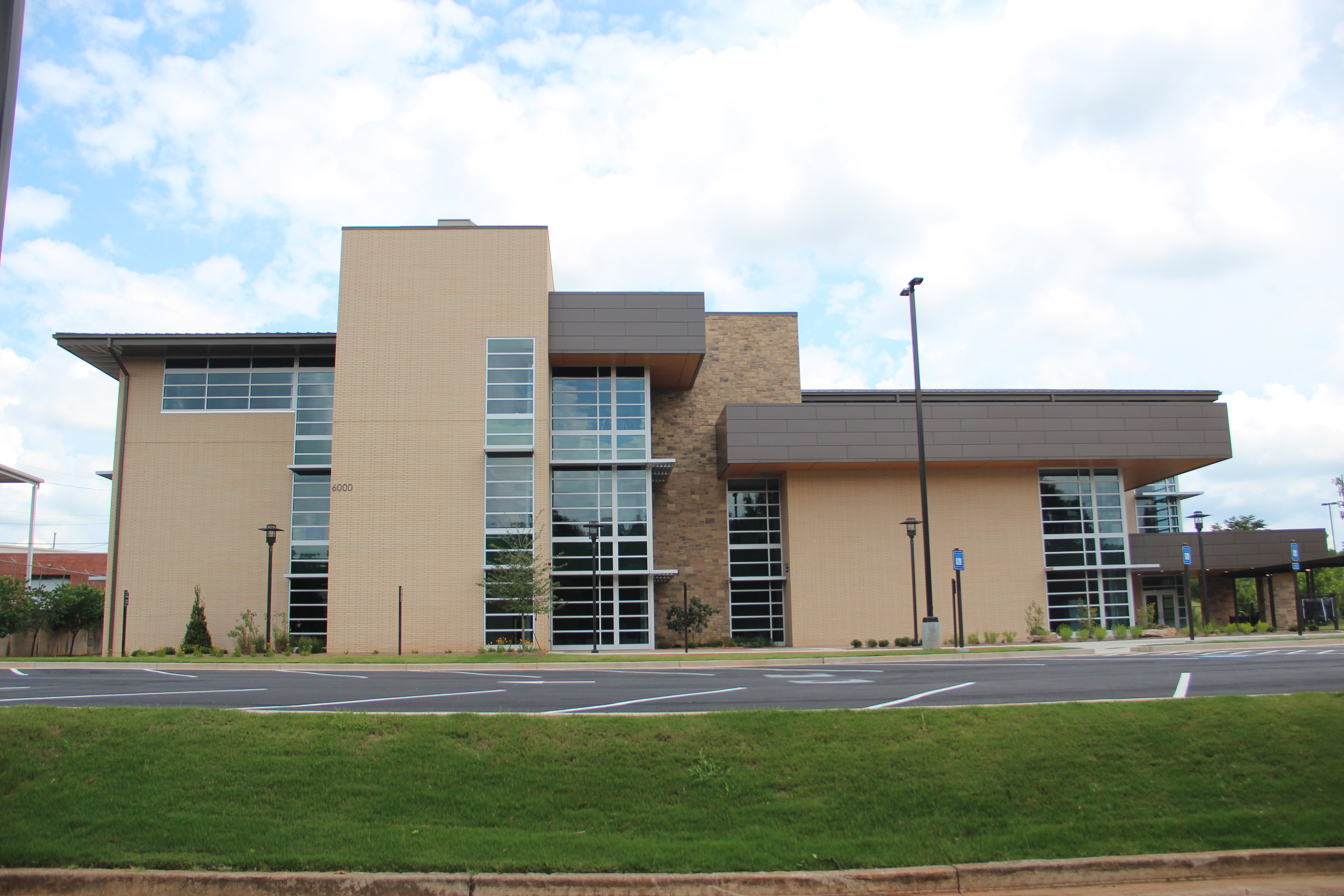

Location
- 700 Cobb Pkwy N Marietta, Cobb County, Georgia 30062; United States; 33.970°N 84.536°W

Information
- Type: Private school
- Established: 1957
- Head teacher: Carl Carlson
- Teaching staff: 118.1 (on an FTE basis)
- Grades: PK–12
- Gender: Co-ed
- Enrollment: 884 (2019–20)
- Student to teacher ratio: 7.0
- Mascot: Wolverine
- Team name: Wolverines
- Website: http://www.thewalkerschool.org

The Walker School, formerly known as the Joseph T. Walker School, is an independent, nonsectarian, and co-educational private college-preparatory school in Marietta, Georgia, United States, on Cobb Parkway (U.S. 41) in what was originally Sprayberry High School. It was founded in 1957 as the St. James Day School at St. James Episcopal Church near the Marietta square. In 1972 the school became an independent body as the Joseph T. Walker School. The school teaches students in pre-kindergarten through 12th grade at the same location.

== Awards and recognition ==
In both 1986 and 1988, the Walker School's magazine, Pegasus, received a Silver Crown Magazine award from the Columbia Scholastic Press Association. In 1988, the magazine was awarded in five separate categories, including for Fiction, Cover Design (two or more colors), Title and Contents Page, Spread Design, Graphics and for Typography (both Lettering and Calligraphy, as well as Logos and Endmarks). In 1985, 1991 and 1994, Pegasus was recognized as a Scholastic Circle Recipient by the Columbia Scholastic Press Association for Overall Design.

The school's 2005 valedictorian, Grace Lu, was designated a Presidential Scholar. Lu was one of two students selected in the state of Georgia out of a maximum of 141 students chosen nationwide.

A student at the school was one of ten students in 2006 nationally to receive the Prudential Spirit of Community Award, for her efforts organizing a fundraiser to help pay for reconstructive surgery for needy children.

Annual tuition ranges from just over $20,050 for preschool to just over $26,225 for the upper school.

== Summer day camps ==
During summer, the Walker School offers over 45 day camps and classes from Early Learners to 12th grade students.

== Notable alumni ==
- Robert Baker (2016) – professional basketball player in the NBA G League
- Charlie Condon (2021) – professional baseball first baseman and outfielder for the Colorado Rockies
- LuJames Groover (2020) – MLB baseball third baseman
- David Hale (2006) – Major League Baseball pitcher
- Hunter Nourzad (2018) – American football center for the Cornell Big Red, the Penn State Nittany Lions, and the Kansas City Chiefs
- Brandon Stanton (2002) – bestselling author; Humans of New York founder/photographer; one of Time Magazine's 30 Under 30 People Changing The World
- Gabriel Weinberg (1997) – founder of DuckDuckGo
- Chris Wyatt (1993) – Napoleon Dynamite producer
