= Tanor Bortolini =

American football player (born 2002)

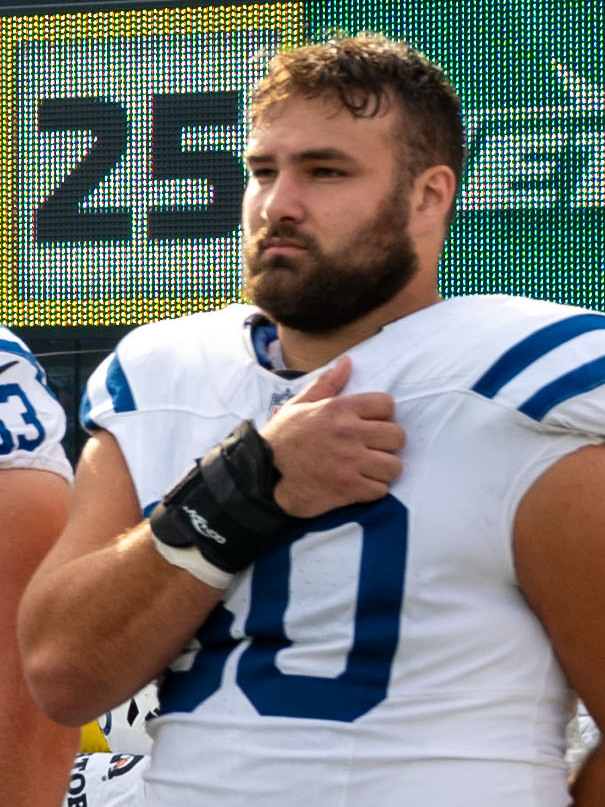
- Bortolini with the Indianapolis Colts in 2024

No. 60 – Indianapolis Colts
- Position: Center
- Roster status: Active

Personal information
- Born: June 17, 2002 (age 24); Kewaunee, Wisconsin, U.S.
- Listed height: 6 ft 4 in (1.93 m)
- Listed weight: 303 lb (137 kg)

Career information
- High school: Kewaunee (WI)
- College: Wisconsin (2020–2023)
- NFL draft: 2024: 4th round, 117th overall pick

Career history
- Indianapolis Colts (2024–present)

Awards and highlights
- Third-team All-Big Ten (2023)

Career NFL statistics as of Week 4, 2026
- Games played: 32
- Games started: 25
- Stats at Pro Football Reference

Tanor Bortolini (born June 17, 2002) is an American professional football center for the Indianapolis Colts of the National Football League (NFL). He played college football for the Wisconsin Badgers and was selected by the Colts in the fourth round of the 2024 NFL draft.

== Early life ==
Bortolini was born in Kewaunee, Wisconsin where he attended Kewaunee High School. Coming out of high school Bortolini held offers from schools such as Harvard, Yale, Iowa, Miami, and Wisconsin. Bortolini committed to play college football for the Wisconsin Badgers.

== College career ==
In Bortolini's freshman season in the COVID shortened 2020 season, he played in just two games. During the 2021 season, Bortolini played in ten games making five starts at guard. In the 2022 season, Bortolini appeared in eleven games making ten starts, while allowing just one sack on the season; for his performance, he was named honorable mention all-Big Ten.

Bortolini entered the 2023 season, as the Badgers' starting center. In week three of the 2023 season in a win over Georgia Southern, Bortolini struggled making three errant snaps. During the 2023 season, Bortolini played in 12 games starting in all of them while earning the highest PFF grade on the Badgers. For his performance on the 2023 season, Bortolini was named third team all-Big Ten. After the conclusion of the 2023 season, Bortolini declared for the 2024 NFL draft.

In Bortolini's career he played in 34 games making 28 starts, while starting games at offensive tackle, guard, and center.

== Professional career ==
Pre-draft measurables
Height	Weight	Arm length	Hand span	Wingspan	40-yard dash	10-yard split	20-yard split	20-yard shuttle	Three-cone drill	Vertical jump	Broad jump	Bench press
6 ft 4 1/4 in (1.94 m)	303 lb (137 kg)	31 1/2 in (0.80 m)	10 in (0.25 m)	6 ft 5 5/8 in (1.97 m)	4.94 s	1.69 s	2.84 s	4.28 s	7.16 s	32.5 in (0.83 m)	9 ft 4 in (2.84 m)	27 reps
All values from NFL Combine/Pro Day

Bortolini was drafted by the Indianapolis Colts in the 4th round (117th overall) of the 2024 NFL Draft. His early development was hindered by a sprained big toe suffered in the team's second preseason game, an injury which sidelined him from practice for the rest of preseason.

He first started for the Colts in their week 4 home game against the Pittsburgh Steelers, owing to a neck injury suffered in practice by veteran starting center Ryan Kelly. Bortolini was able to take practice reps with the first team for two practices preceding the Steeler game, helping him ease into the starting role. During the first series of the game, the Colts capped a long drive with a powerful Bortolini block leading running back Jonathan Taylor into the end zone for a touchdown. Bortolini captured attention racing the length of the Colts' sideline slapping high-fives with anyone within reach.

After the game, Colts offensive coordinator Jim Bob Cooter quipped, "Man, first game, he was damn sure excited to be out there. We’re trying to get the GPS data on that top speed there."
