= Keith Randolph =

American football player (born 2001)

Keith Randolph Jr.
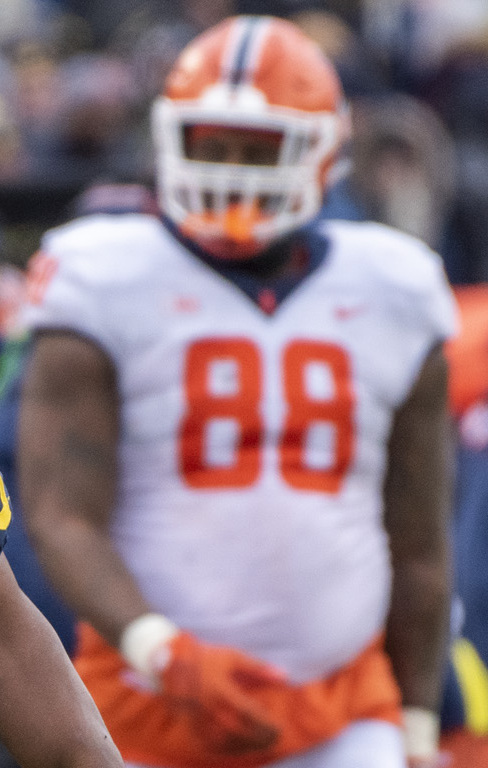
- Randolph Jr. with Illinois in 2022

Profile
- Position: Defensive tackle

Personal information
- Born: September 1, 2001 (age 25); Belleville, Illinois, U.S.
- Listed height: 6 ft 4 in (1.93 m)
- Listed weight: 296 lb (134 kg)

Career information
- High school: Belleville West
- College: Illinois (2019–2023)
- NFL draft: 2024: undrafted

Career history
- Chicago Bears (2024)*; Green Bay Packers (2025)*
- * Offseason or practice squad member only

Awards and highlights
- 2x Third-team All-Big Ten (2022, 2023)
- Stats at Pro Football Reference

Keith Randolph Jr. (born September 1, 2001) is an American professional football defensive tackle. He played college football for the Illinois Fighting Illini.

== Early life ==
In Randolph's senior season, he notched 56 tackles with nine being for a loss, and seven sacks, while being named all-state. In high school, Randolph also played basketball, as he was a part of two state championship teams. Coming out of high school, Randolph held offers from schools such as Florida State, Colorado, Michigan State, Illinois, Iowa, Indiana and Minnesota. Randolph decided to commit to play college football for the Illinois Fighting Illini.

== College career ==
In Randolph's first collegiate season, he played in the games making seven tackles with half a tackle going for a loss. In week one of the 2020 season, Randolph played 26 snaps notching four tackles versus Wisconsin. Randolph finished the covid shortened 2020 season with eight tackles and a pass deflection. In week eleven of the 2021 season, Randolph recorded his first career interception which he returned 30 yards, as he helped the Fighting Illini beat Charlotte. In the 2021 season, Randolph tallied 42 tackles, with five and a half being for a loss, four sacks, a pass deflection, an interception, and a forced fumble. Randolph finished the 2022 season with 53 tackles with 13 going for a loss, four and a half sacks, a pass deflection, and an interception. For his performance in the 2022 season, Randolph was named third team all Big-10. Randolph entered the 2023 season as a team captain for the Fighting Illini. Randolph was also named to the 2023 preseason Outland Trophy watch list and the Nagurksi Award watch list. Randolph finished the 2023 season with 49 tackles with four being for a loss, a sack and a half, and a pass deflection. After the conclusion of the 2023 season, Randolph declared for the 2024 NFL draft.

Randolph finished his career as a Fighting Illini, playing in 42 games making 159 tackles with 23 going for a loss, ten sacks, six pass deflections, two interceptions, and a forced fumble.

== Professional career ==
Pre-draft measurables
Height	Weight	Arm length	Hand span	Wingspan	40-yard dash	10-yard split	20-yard split	20-yard shuttle	Three-cone drill	Vertical jump	Broad jump	Bench press
6 ft 3 1/2 in (1.92 m)	296 lb (134 kg)	32 3/4 in (0.83 m)	9 7/8 in (0.25 m)	6 ft 8 1/4 in (2.04 m)	5.15 s	1.78 s	2.97 s	4.81 s	7.75 s	28.5 in (0.72 m)	8 ft 9 in (2.67 m)	21 reps
All values from NFL Combine/Pro Day

=== Chicago Bears ===
Randolph signed with the Chicago Bears as an undrafted free agent on May 9, 2024. He was waived on August 24.

=== Green Bay Packers ===
On January 14, 2025, Randolph signed a Reserve/Futures contract with the Green Bay Packers. He was waived with an injury designation on August 18.
