= Dragan Kesich =

American football player

No. 99 – Minnesota Golden Gophers
- Position: Placekicker
- Class: Graduate student

Personal information
- Born: Oak Creek, Wisconsin, U.S.
- Listed height: 6 ft 4 in (1.93 m)
- Listed weight: 243 lb (110 kg)

Career information
- High school: Oak Creek (Oak Creek)
- College: Minnesota (2020–present)

Awards and highlights
- Big Ten Kicker of the Year (2023); First-team All-Big Ten (2023)
- Stats at ESPN

Dragan Kesich is an American college football kicker for the Minnesota Golden Gophers.

== Early life ==
Kesich was born and raised in Oak Creek, Wisconsin, and attended Oak Creek High School. In his high school career, he finished with 96% of his kickoffs which resulted in a touchback. He earned all-conference and all-region honors in 2018 and 2019 and was also a finalist for the Wisconsin Sports Awards Kicker of the Year Award in 2019. He was rated a five-star recruit and committed to play college football at the University of Minnesota as a walk-on.

== College career ==
During Kesich's true freshman season in 2020, he played in five games and finished the season with kicking off 24 times and recording 10 touchbacks for 1,501 yards with an average of 62.5 yards per game.

During the 2021 season, he played in 12 games while serving as the team's kickoff specialist. He finished the season with recording 42 touchbacks on 66 kickoffs for 4,197 yards, with an average of 63.6% yards per games.

During the 2022 season, he played in all 13 games and finished the season with kicking off 71 times for 4,586 yards, tying for the first in the nation with an average of 64.6 yards per game. He also recorded 59 touchbacks ranking third in the nation with an 83.1% touchback success rate.

During the 2023 season, he played in 12 games and kicked off 56 times for 3,622 yards and recorded 47 touchbacks for an average of 64.7 yards per game. He was named on the first-team All-Big and the Bakken-Anderson Big Ten Kicker of the Year.

== Professional career ==
Pre-draft measurables
Height	Weight	Arm length	Hand span
6 ft 4 1/8 in (1.93 m)	243 lb (110 kg)	32 1/4 in (0.82 m)	9 1/2 in (0.24 m)
All values from Pro Day

== Personal life ==
Kesich is of Serbian heritage and is a relative of NHL hockey player, Milan Lucic.
