= Sanoussi Kane =

American football player (born 2001)

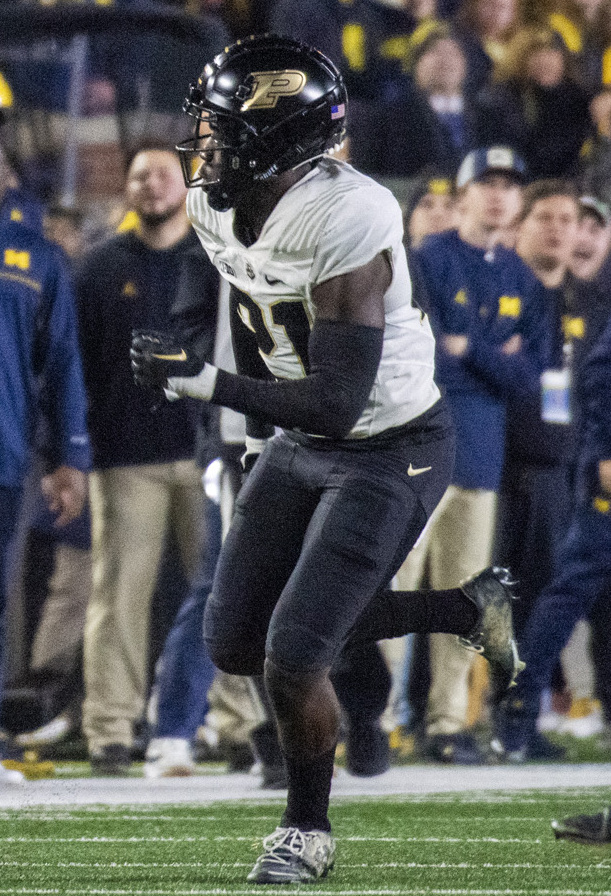
- Kane with Purdue in 2023

Profile
- Position: Safety

Personal information
- Born: October 6, 2001 (age 25); Harlem, New York, U.S.
- Listed height: 5 ft 11 in (1.80 m)
- Listed weight: 210 lb (95 kg)

Career information
- High school: Blair Academy (Blairstown, New Jersey)
- College: Purdue (2020–2023)
- NFL draft: 2024: 7th round, 250th overall pick

Career history
- Baltimore Ravens (2024–2025); Tennessee Titans (2025)

Career NFL statistics
- Total tackles: 17
- Stats at Pro Football Reference

Sanoussi Kane (born October 6, 2001) is an American professional football safety. He played college football for the Purdue Boilermakers and was selected by the Baltimore Ravens in the seventh round of the 2024 NFL draft. He has also played for the Tennessee Titans.

== Early life ==
Kane was born on October 6, 2001, and grew up in Harlem, New York. He initially played soccer before trying out football in eighth grade. He attended Blair Academy in New Jersey and was a standout two-way football player, being a defensive back on defense. He also ran track and competed for the wrestling team at Blair. A three-star recruit, he committed to play college football for the Purdue Boilermakers.

== College career ==
Kane appeared in six games as a true freshman at Purdue in 2020, recording three tackles. He then appeared in 13 games, one as a starter, in the 2021 season, making seven tackles. He had hip surgery in April 2022 but managed to come back in time for the season opener. He started 12 of 14 games that year and led the team with 72 tackles, also having 4.5 tackles-for-loss and a sack. He was team captain as a senior in 2023 and was named honorable mention All-Big Ten Conference, being second on the team in tackles and first in pass breakups with seven. He entered the 2024 NFL draft after the season and ended his collegiate career with 161 tackles, 10 pass breakups and three forced fumbles.

== Professional career ==
Pre-draft measurables
Height	Weight	Arm length	Hand span	Wingspan	40-yard dash	10-yard split	20-yard split	20-yard shuttle	Three-cone drill	Vertical jump	Broad jump	Bench press
5 ft 11 5/8 in (1.82 m)	207 lb (94 kg)	31 1/8 in (0.79 m)	9 1/2 in (0.24 m)	6 ft 4 1/2 in (1.94 m)	4.52 s	1.50 s	2.64 s	4.32 s	7.09 s	36.5 in (0.93 m)	10 ft 8 in (3.25 m)	12 reps
All values from Pro Day

=== Baltimore Ravens ===
Kane was selected in the seventh round (250th overall) of the 2024 NFL draft by the Baltimore Ravens.

On November 4, 2025, Kane was waived by the Ravens and re-signed to the practice squad.

=== Tennessee Titans ===
On December 16, 2025, Kane was signed by the Tennessee Titans off the Ravens practice squad.

On July 30, 2026, Kane was waived by the Titans with an injury designation.
