= Tyler Nubin =

American football player (born 2001)

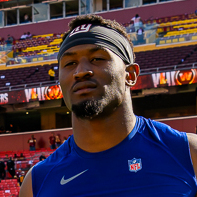
- Nubin with the New York Giants in 2025

No. 27 – New York Giants
- Position: Safety
- Roster status: Active

Personal information
- Born: June 14, 2001 (age 25); St. Charles, Illinois, U.S.
- Listed height: 6 ft 2 in (1.88 m)
- Listed weight: 210 lb (95 kg)

Career information
- High school: St. Charles North
- College: Minnesota (2019–2023)
- NFL draft: 2024: 2nd round, 47th overall pick

Career history
- New York Giants (2024–present)

Awards and highlights
- First-team All-American (2023); First-team All-Big Ten (2023); Second-team All-Big Ten (2022)

Career NFL statistics as of Week 9, 2026
- Total tackles: 199
- Forced fumbles: 1
- Fumble recoveries: 2
- Pass deflections: 6
- Defensive touchdowns: 1
- Stats at Pro Football Reference

Tyler Nubin (born June 14, 2001) is an American professional football safety for the New York Giants of the National Football League (NFL). He played college football for the Minnesota Golden Gophers and was selected by the Giants in the second round of the 2024 NFL draft.

== Early life ==
Nubin grew up in South Elgin, Illinois and attended St. Charles North High School. As a senior, he had 51 tackles, five tackles for loss, and six passes broken up on defense while also catching 42 passes for 549 yards and nine touchdowns as a wide receiver and rushing for 600 yards and 12 touchdowns on 109 carries from the quarterback position in the wildcat formation. Nubin committed to play college football at Minnesota over offers from Michigan, Tennessee, and Wisconsin.

== College career ==
Nubin played in 12 games and had six tackles during his freshman season at Minnesota. He finished his sophomore season with 41 tackles, one interception, and one forced fumble. Nubin made 52 tackles with one sack and three interceptions as a junior. He suffered an injury that caused him to miss the final two games of his senior season, but returned to play in the 2022 Pinstripe Bowl. Nubin finished the season with 55 tackles, two tackles for loss, four interceptions, and one forced fumble and was named second-team All-Big Ten. After considering entering the 2023 NFL Draft, Nubin decided to utilize the extra year of eligibility granted to college athletes who played in the 2020 season due to the coronavirus pandemic and return to Minnesota for a fifth season. In the 2023 season, Nubin led the Gophers on defense with 5 interceptions, breaking the program record for career interceptions with 13. Additionally, Nubin finished the 2023 season with 53 tackles, four pass deflections, and one forced fumble and recovery. At the end of the season, Nubin was named first-team All-Big Ten and first-team All-American before declaring for the 2024 NFL Draft.

== Professional career ==
Pre-draft measurables
Height	Weight	Arm length	Hand span	Wingspan	40-yard dash	10-yard split	20-yard split	20-yard shuttle	Three-cone drill	Vertical jump	Broad jump	Bench press
6 ft 1 1/4 in (1.86 m)	199 lb (90 kg)	32 in (0.81 m)	9 in (0.23 m)	6 ft 5 1/2 in (1.97 m)	4.59 s	1.65 s	2.68 s	4.51 s	7.20 s	31.5 in (0.80 m)	10 ft 0 in (3.05 m)	10 reps
All values from NFL Combine/Pro Day

Nubin was selected in the second round, 47th overall pick, by the New York Giants in the 2024 NFL draft. The Giants previously acquired the pick used on Nubin in an October 2023 trade with the Seattle Seahawks for Leonard Williams. He started 13 games for New York during the season, recording one pass deflection, one forced fumble, one fumble recovery, and 98 combined tackles; his season ended due to a high-ankle sprain he suffered in Week 14. On January 6, 2025, it was announced that Nubin had undergone surgery to repair the injury.

Nubin entered the 2025 campaign as one of New York's starting defensive backs. In Week 16 against the Minnesota Vikings, Brian Burns forced a fumble against J. J. McCarthy, which Nubin returned 27 yards for his first career touchdown. In 13 appearances for the team, he recorded two pass deflections, one fumble recovery, and 78 combined tackles. On December 27, 2025, Nubin was placed on season-ending injured reserve due to a neck injury.

== NFL career statistics ==
Legend
**Bold**	Career high

=== Regular season ===
Year	Team	Games		Tackles					Interceptions						Fumbles				
Year	Team	GP	GS	Cmb	Solo	Ast	Sck	TFL	Int	Yds	Avg	Lng	TD	PD	FF	Fmb	FR	Yds	TD
2024	NYG	13	13	**98**	**57**	**41**	0.0	4	0	0	0.0	0	0	1	**1**	0	**1**	2	0
2025	NYG	13	11	78	49	29	0.0	**7**	0	0	0.0	0	0	**2**	0	0	**1**	**27**	**1**
Career		26	24	176	106	70	0.0	11	0	0	0.0	0	0	3	1	0	2	29	1

== Personal life ==
Nubin's father played college football at Eastern Michigan. His younger brother Jordan plays running back at Kent State.
