= Kris Jenkins Jr. =

American football player (born 2001)

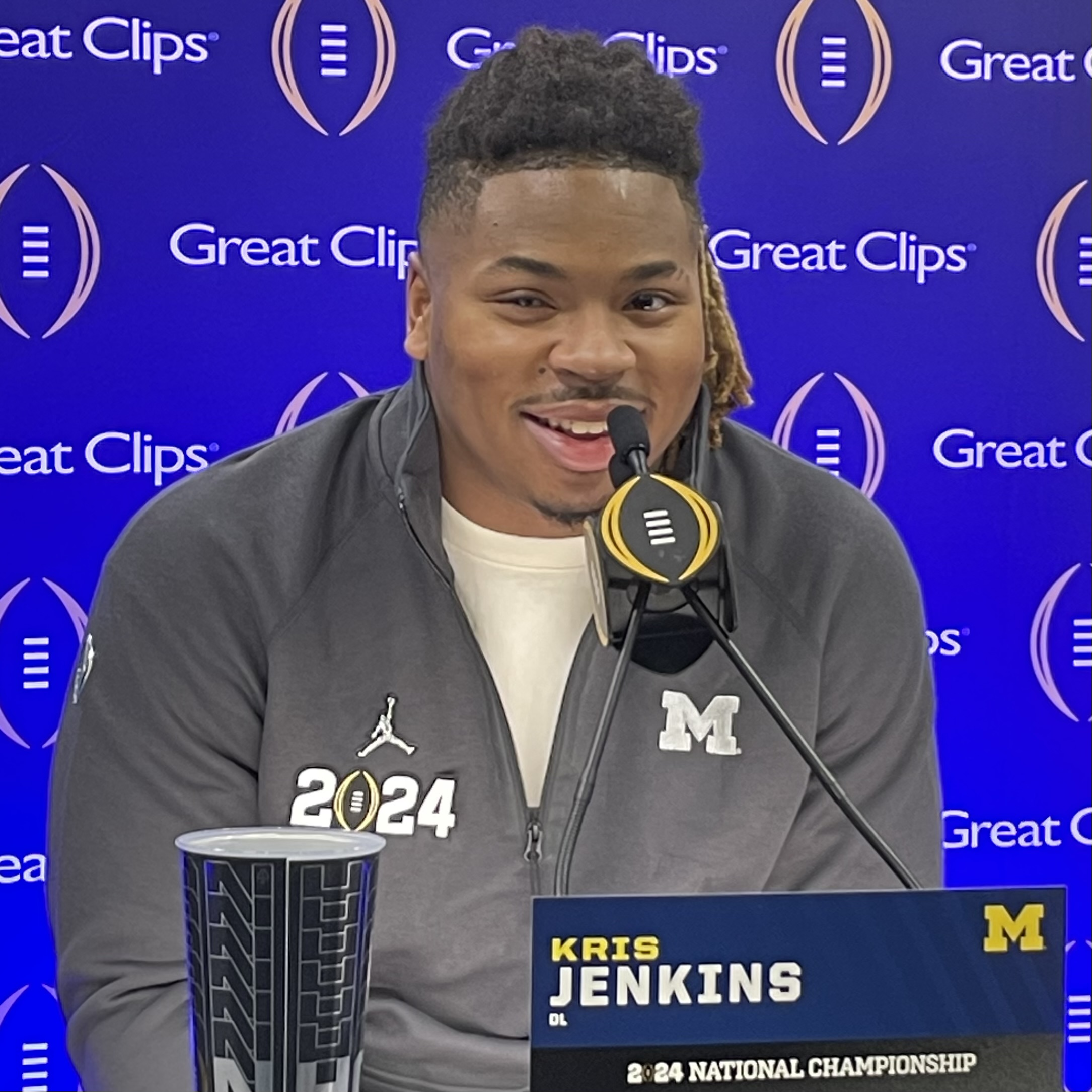
- Jenkins in 2024

No. 90 – Cincinnati Bengals
- Position: Defensive tackle
- Roster status: Active

Personal information
- Born: October 10, 2001 (age 25); Olney, Maryland, U.S.
- Listed height: 6 ft 3 in (1.91 m)
- Listed weight: 310 lb (141 kg)

Career information
- High school: Our Lady of Good Counsel (Olney)
- College: Michigan (2020–2023)
- NFL draft: 2024: 2nd round, 49th overall pick

Career history
- Cincinnati Bengals (2024–present)

Awards and highlights
- CFP national champion (2023); Second-team All-American (2023); Second-team All-Big Ten (2023)

Career NFL statistics as of Week 8, 2026
- Total tackles: 75
- Sacks: 6.5
- Pass deflections: 1
- Stats at Pro Football Reference

Kristopher Rudy-Charles Jenkins Jr. (born October 10, 2001) is an American professional football defensive tackle for the Cincinnati Bengals of the National Football League (NFL). He was an All-American for the Michigan Wolverines, winning three consecutive Big Ten Conference titles, and a national championship in 2023. Jenkins was selected by the Bengals in the second round of the 2024 NFL draft. He is the son of former NFL player Kris Jenkins.

== Early life ==
Jenkins was born on October 10, 2001, in Olney, Maryland, the son of former NFL player Kris Jenkins, as well as being the nephew of Cullen Jenkins. He attended Our Lady of Good Counsel High School, as a senior recording 40 tackles, 19 tackles for a loss, 15 sacks, 5 pass breakups, 3 forced fumbles and a fumble recovery for a touchdown.

He committed to play college football at the University of Michigan on July 3, 2019.

== College career ==
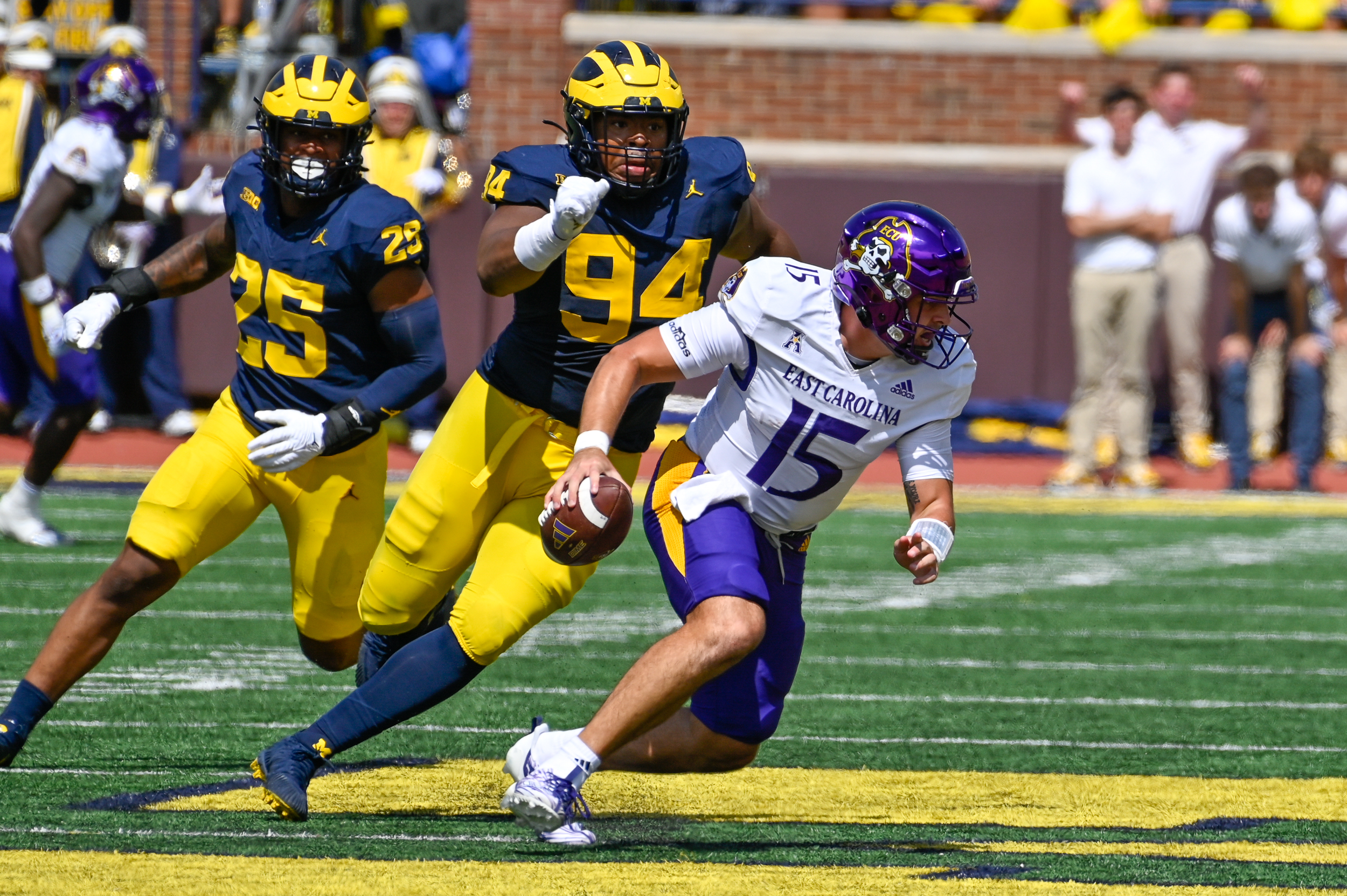
Jenkins (#94) versus East Carolina in 2023.

Jenkins enrolled at the University of Michigan in 2020, playing in one game as a true freshman. In 2021, he played in all 14 games, with four starts, and had 22 tackles. As a junior in 2022, he started all 14 games totaling 54 tackles and two sacks.

He returned to Michigan for his senior season in 2023, captaining Michigan to a national championship. Jenkins was awarded Second-team All-American honors by the FWAA and the AFCA. Appearing in all 15 games, Jenkins finished with 37 tackles, 2.5 sacks and an interception on the year.

== Professional career ==
Pre-draft measurables
Height	Weight	Arm length	Hand span	Wingspan	40-yard dash	10-yard split	20-yard split	20-yard shuttle	Vertical jump	Broad jump	Bench press
6 ft 2 3/4 in (1.90 m)	299 lb (136 kg)	34 in (0.86 m)	9 3/8 in (0.24 m)	6 ft 7 1/8 in (2.01 m)	4.91 s	1.70 s	2.84 s	4.63 s	30.0 in (0.76 m)	9 ft 7 in (2.92 m)	29 reps
All values from NFL Combine/Pro Day

Jenkins was selected 49th overall by the Cincinnati Bengals in the second round of the 2024 NFL draft. He played in 15 games with nine starts as a rookie, recording 31 tackles and three sacks.

In Jenkins' second season, he recorded 36 tackles and 1.5 sacks through 14 games (including four starts). On December 19, 2025, Jenkins was placed on season-ending injured reserve due to an ankle injury suffered in Week 15 against the Baltimore Ravens.
