= Matthew Jones (offensive lineman) =

American football player (born 1999)

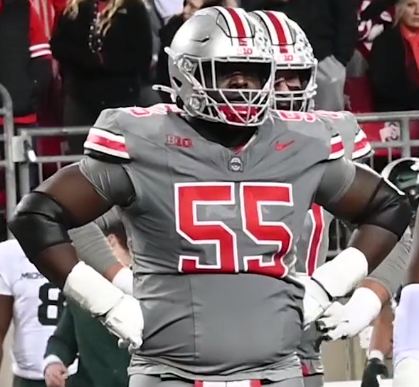
- Jones with Ohio State in 2023

Profile
- Position: Guard

Personal information
- Born: June 13, 1999 (age 27); Brooklyn, New York, U.S.
- Listed height: 6 ft 4 in (1.93 m)
- Listed weight: 315 lb (143 kg)

Career information
- High school: Erasmus Hall (NY)
- College: Ohio State (2018–2023)
- NFL draft: 2024: undrafted

Career history
- Miami Dolphins (2024)*; Arizona Cardinals (2024)*; Columbus Aviators (2026)*
- * Offseason or practice squad member only

Awards and highlights
- 2× Second-team All-Big Ten (2022, 2023)
- Stats at Pro Football Reference

Matthew Jones (born June 13, 1999) is an American professional football guard. He played college football for the Ohio State Buckeyes.

== Early life ==
Jones grew up in Brooklyn, New York and attended high school at Erasmus Hall. Jones was rated a four start prospect coming out of high school and decided to commit to play college football at Ohio State, over other school such as Alabama, Clemson, Florida, Michigan, and Penn State.

== College career ==
In Jones first season with the Buckeyes he would redshirt, and then in the next year he would back up Jonah Jackson. However Jones would get his first opportunity to start in the following season where he get his first career start in Ohio State's season finale versus Michigan State, he would also get to start in Ohio State's college football playoffs game against Clemson, and again against Alabama in the National Championship. During the 2021 season Jones played in 12 games, starting in three of them. However, during the 2022 season Jones would have his breakout season playing in 12 games starting in them all, while also earning Second Team All Big-Ten honors. After the conclusion of the 2022 season, Jones announced he would return for his extra season of eligibility for the 2023 season.

== Professional career ==
Pre-draft measurables
Height	Weight	Arm length	Hand span	Wingspan	40-yard dash	10-yard split	20-yard split	20-yard shuttle	Three-cone drill	Vertical jump	Broad jump	Bench press
6 ft 3 1/2 in (1.92 m)	316 lb (143 kg)	32 5/8 in (0.83 m)	9 in (0.23 m)	6 ft 8 1/2 in (2.04 m)	5.21 s	1.87 s	3.04 s	4.88 s	7.90 s	28.0 in (0.71 m)	8 ft 7 in (2.62 m)	23 reps
All values from NFL Combine/Pro Day

=== Miami Dolphins ===
Jones signed with the Miami Dolphins as an undrafted free agent on May 10, 2024. He was waived on August 27.

=== Arizona Cardinals ===
On December 26, 2024, Jones was signed to the Arizona Cardinals' practice squad. He signed a reserve/future contract with Arizona on January 6, 2025. On April 29, Jones was released by the Cardinals.

=== Columbus Aviators ===
On January 14, 2026, Jones was selected by the Columbus Aviators of the United Football League (UFL). He was released on March 19.
