= JT Tuimoloau =

American football player (born 2003)

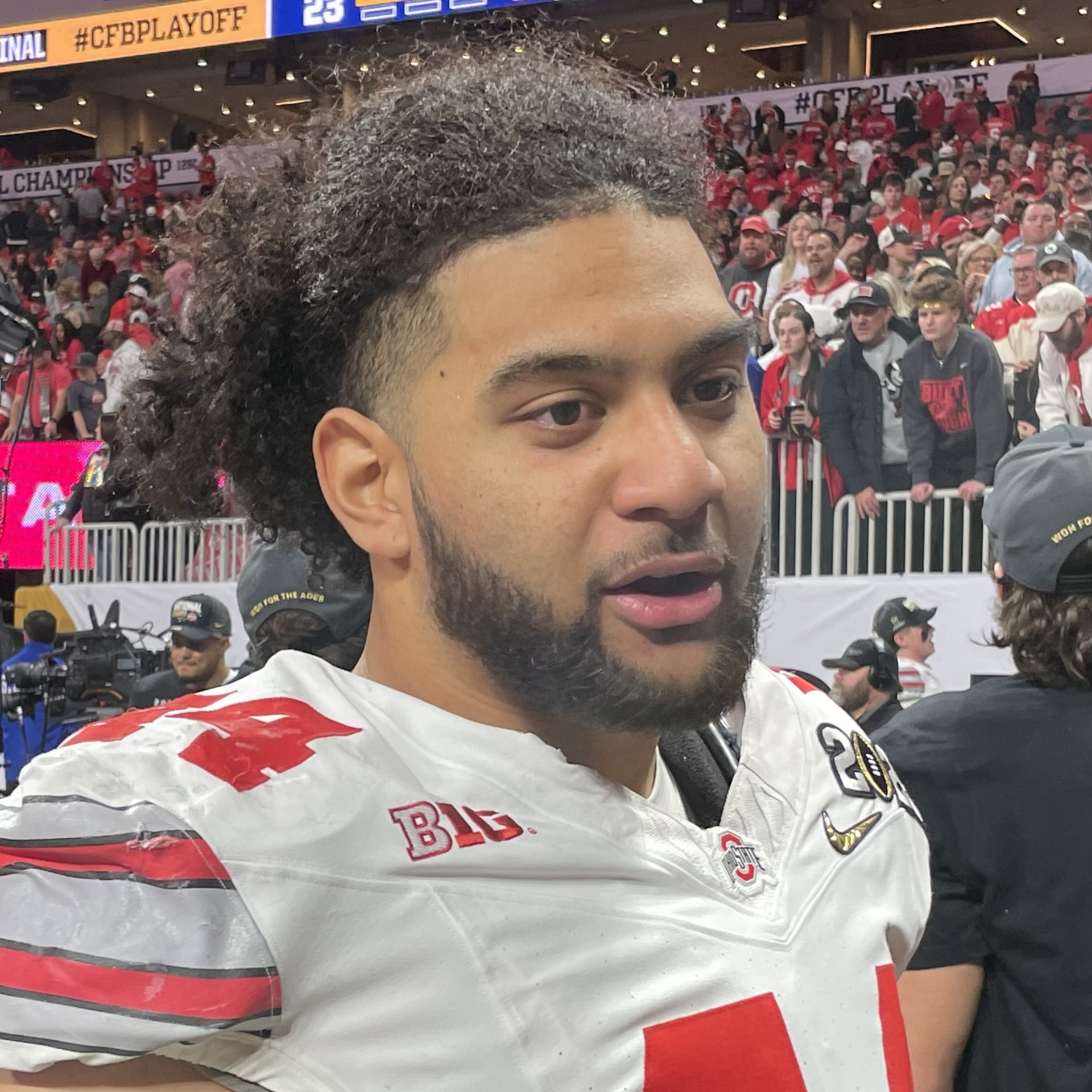
- Tuimoloau with the Ohio State Buckeyes in 2025

No. 91 – Indianapolis Colts
- Position: Defensive end
- Roster status: Active

Personal information
- Born: May 10, 2003 (age 23)
- Listed height: 6 ft 4 in (1.93 m)
- Listed weight: 264 lb (120 kg)

Career information
- High school: Eastside Catholic (Sammamish, Washington)
- College: Ohio State (2021–2024)
- NFL draft: 2025: 2nd round, 45th overall pick

Career history
- Indianapolis Colts (2025–present)

Awards and highlights
- CFP national champion (2024); 3× first-team All-Big Ten (2022–2024)

Career NFL statistics as of Week 9, 2026
- Total tackles: 38
- Sacks: 2.0
- Forced fumbles: 1
- Pass deflections: 5
- Stats at Pro Football Reference

Jaylahn "JT" Tuimoloau (too-EE-MOH-lou-OW; born May 10, 2003) is an American professional football defensive end for the Indianapolis Colts of the National Football League (NFL). He played college football for the Ohio State Buckeyes and was selected by the Colts in the second round of the 2025 NFL draft. He was named the 2020 Polynesian High School Football Player of the Year.

== Early life ==
Tuimoloau was born on May 10, 2003, in Tacoma, Washington, and grew up in Edgewood, Washington, located in north Pierce County. In view of his size and athletic attributes and hoping to increase his prospects of an athletic scholarship, JT was encouraged by his family to commute several hours a day to attend Eastside Catholic School in Sammamish, Washington, a football powerhouse.

At Eastside, Tuimoloau was named the 2020 Polynesian High School Football Player of the Year. A top national gridiron prospect, Tuimoloau attracted offers from West coast regional football powers such as the University of Washington, University of Oregon, University of Southern California, and UCLA as well as leading national programs like Notre Dame University, the University of Oklahoma, University of Alabama, Texas A&M, and the University of Michigan, before committing to play at the Ohio State University.

He was also offered a basketball scholarship for the Oregon Ducks.

== College career ==
Tuimolau played in every game at Ohio State as a freshman in 2021. He finished the season with 17 tackles, 4.5 tackles for loss, and 2.5 sacks. Tuimolau also considered playing basketball for the Buckeyes, but opted to focus on football.

Against Penn State in 2022, he had two interceptions, two sacks, a forced fumble, a fumble recovery, and a touchdown, becoming the first FBS player to accomplish that since 2000.

In his senior season of 2024, Tuimoloau helped lead the Buckeyes to a national championship in the College Football Playoff.

== Professional career ==
Pre-draft measurables
Height	Weight	Arm length	Hand span	Wingspan	20-yard shuttle	Vertical jump	Broad jump	Bench press
6 ft 4 1/4 in (1.94 m)	265 lb (120 kg)	33 3/4 in (0.86 m)	10 1/2 in (0.27 m)	6 ft 10 3/8 in (2.09 m)	4.38 s	35.5 in (0.90 m)	9 ft 11 in (3.02 m)	24 reps
All values from NFL Combine/Pro Day

Tuimoloau was selected in the second round with the 45th pick in the 2025 NFL draft by the Indianapolis Colts.

Tuimoloau saw his first NFL game action September 14, 2025, in a week 2 matchup against the Denver Broncos.

== Personal life ==
Tuimoloau is the son of Ponce de Leon Faletoi and Alofa Tuimoloau. He is a Christian.
