= Chop Robinson =

American football player (born 2003)

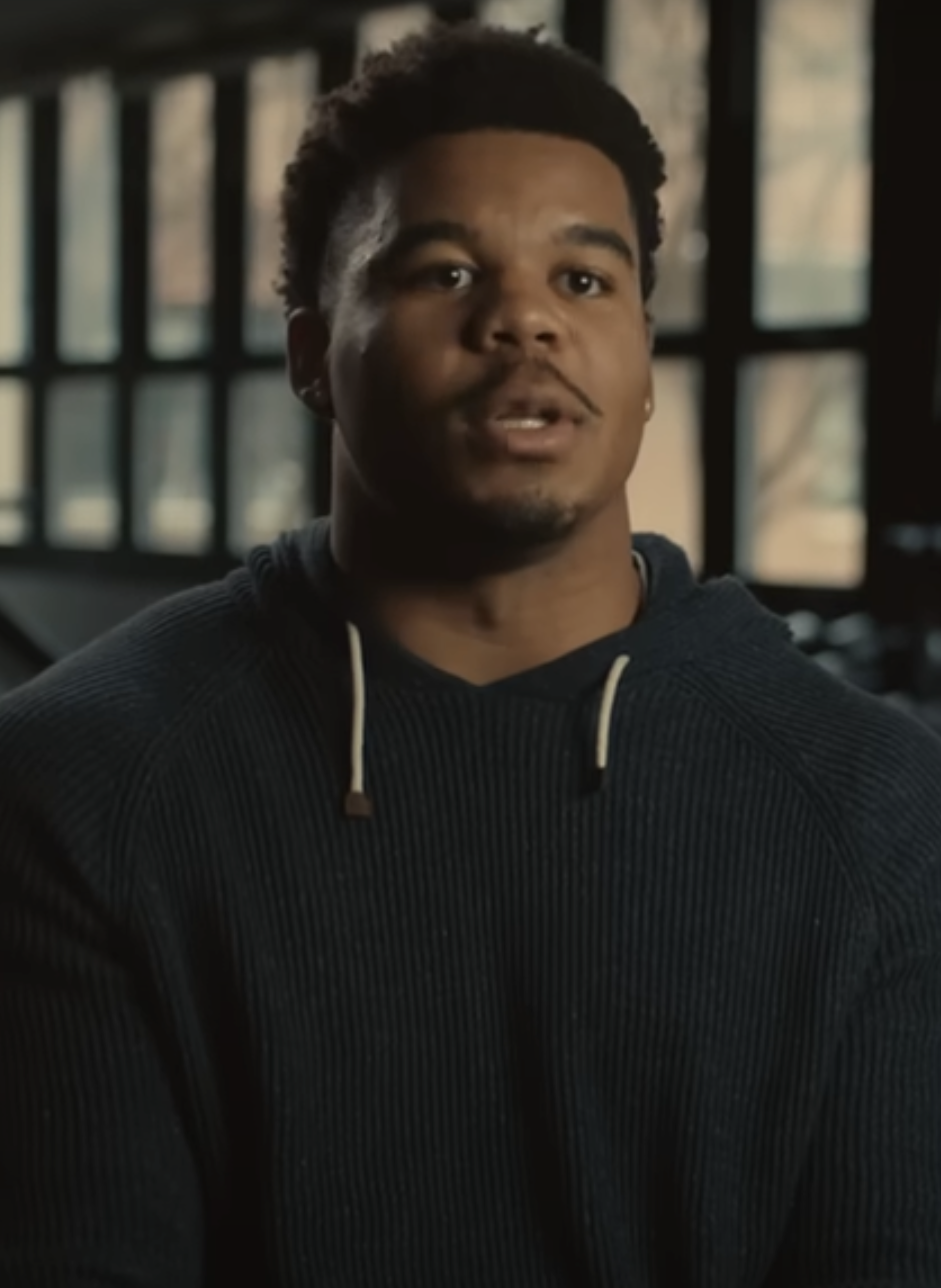
- Robinson in 2024

No. 44 – Miami Dolphins
- Position: Linebacker
- Roster status: Active

Personal information
- Born: January 2, 2003 (age 23); Gaithersburg, Maryland, U.S.
- Listed height: 6 ft 3 in (1.91 m)
- Listed weight: 265 lb (120 kg)

Career information
- High school: Quince Orchard (Gaithersburg)
- College: Maryland (2021); Penn State (2022–2023)
- NFL draft: 2024: 1st round, 21st overall pick

Career history
- Miami Dolphins (2024–present)

Awards and highlights
- PFWA All-Rookie Team (2024); First-team All-Big Ten (2023)

Career NFL statistics as of Week 10, 2026
- Total tackles: 67
- Sacks: 15.0
- Forced fumbles: 2
- Fumble recoveries: 1
- Pass deflections: 5
- Stats at Pro Football Reference

Demeioun "Chop" Robinson (born January 2, 2003) is an American professional football linebacker for the Miami Dolphins of the National Football League (NFL). He played college football for the Maryland Terrapins and Penn State Nittany Lions. Robinson was selected by the Dolphins in the first round of the 2024 NFL draft.

== Early life ==
Robinson was nicknamed "Pork-chop" because he weighed 11 or 12 pounds at birth; his name was later shortened to "Chop". He attended Quince Orchard High School in Gaithersburg, Maryland. He committed to playing in the 2021 Under Armour All-American Game, however, the game was canceled due to COVID-19. That same season, he committed to play college football at University of Maryland, College Park, becoming one of the highest-ranked prospects in Maryland Terrapins football history.

== College career ==
=== Maryland ===
As a true freshman at Maryland in 2021, Robinson played in all 13 games with one start and had 19 tackles and two sacks.

=== Penn State ===
After his freshman season, Robinson transferred to Penn State University. In his first season as a Nittany Lion, he played in 12 games and made 26 tackles and 5.5 sacks. During his 2023 junior season, Robinson started 10 games, finishing with 15 total tackles, 4 sacks, 2 forced fumbles, and 1 fumble recovery. For his efforts, he was named First-Team All-Big Ten and co-Team MVP.

Robinson declared for the 2024 NFL draft following the 2023 season.

== Professional career ==
Pre-draft measurables
| Height | Weight | Arm length | Hand span | Wingspan | 40-yard dash | 10-yard split | 20-yard split | 20-yard shuttle | Vertical jump | Broad jump |
|---|---|---|---|---|---|---|---|---|---|---|
| 6 ft 2 7/8 in (1.90 m) | 254 lb (115 kg) | 32 1/2 in (0.83 m) | 9 1/8 in (0.23 m) | 6 ft 4 1/4 in (1.94 m) | 4.48 s | 1.54 s | 2.60 s | 4.25 s | 34.5 in (0.88 m) | 10 ft 8 in (3.25 m) |
All values from NFL Combine

=== 2024 season ===
Robinson was selected by the Miami Dolphins with the 21st overall pick in the 2024 NFL draft. Robinson signed his four-year rookie contract with a fifth-year option on June 13, 2024.

Robinson entered his rookie season with the Dolphins as a rotational defensive player, gradually earning a larger role as the season progressed. He appeared in all 17 regular-season games. Robinson recorded his first NFL sack on November 3 against the Buffalo Bills. He subsequently recorded sacks against the Los Angeles Rams in a Monday Night Football matchup the following week, and went on to record multi-sack totals against the New England Patriots and Houston Texans later in the regular season. Robinson finished the regular season with 26 total tackles, including 16 solo tackles, six sacks and four passes defended. His six sacks ranked second among NFL rookies in 2024 and were tied for the fifth-most by a rookie in Dolphins franchise history. Following the season, Robinson was named to the PFWA All-Rookie Team and finished top 5 in NFL Defensive Rookie of the Year voting.

=== 2025 season ===
Following a dominant second half of his rookie season, Robinson's production dipped in 2025. He suffered two separate concussions during the season, forcing him to miss time. Robinson finished the season with 21 total tackles, including 10 solo tackles, four sacks, one forced fumble and one pass defended.

=== 2026 season ===
In week 3 of the 2026 season, Robinson was called for a controversial roughing the passer call following a hit on Patrick Mahomes during a 24-10 loss. In week 7, Robinson recorded a sack against the New York Jets in the Dolphins' first win of the season. The following week, he recorded a single-game career high 2 sacks against the New England Patriots.

== NFL career statistics ==
| Season | Team | GP | GS | Total tackles | Solo tackles | Sacks | Forced fumbles | Fumble recoveries | Interceptions | Pass deflections |
|---|---|---|---|---|---|---|---|---|---|---|
| 2024 | MIA | 17 | 1 | 26 | 16 | 6.0 | 0 | 0 | 0 | 4 |
| 2025 | MIA | 15 | 3 | 21 | 10 | 4.0 | 1 | 0 | 0 | 1 |
| 2026 | MIA | 8 | 7 | 20 | 10 | 5.0 | 1 | 1 | 0 | 0 |
| Career | | 40 | 11 | 67 | 36 | 15.0 | 2 | 1 | 0 | 5 |
