= Kalen King =

American football player (born 2003)

No. 35 – Arizona Cardinals
- Position: Cornerback
- Roster status: Active

Personal information
- Born: January 28, 2003 (age 23); Detroit, Michigan, U.S.
- Listed height: 5 ft 11 in (1.80 m)
- Listed weight: 190 lb (86 kg)

Career information
- High school: Cass Technical (Detroit)
- College: Penn State (2021–2023)
- NFL draft: 2024: 7th round, 255th overall pick

Career history
- Green Bay Packers (2024); Carolina Panthers (2025); Arizona Cardinals (2025–present)

Awards and highlights
- Second-team All-Big Ten (2023); Third-team All-Big Ten (2022)

Career NFL statistics as of Week 7, 2026
- Tackles: 9
- Pass deflections: 1
- Stats at Pro Football Reference

Kalen Daron King (born January 28, 2003) is an American professional football cornerback for the Arizona Cardinals of the National Football League (NFL). He played college football for the Penn State Nittany Lions.

== Early life ==
King grew up in Detroit, Michigan and attended Cass Technical High School. King was rated a four-star recruit and committed to play college football at Penn State over offers from Michigan, Wisconsin, and Michigan State.

== College career ==
King joined the Penn State Nittany Lions as an early enrollee in January 2021. He had 23 tackles, one tackle for loss, five passes broken up, and one forced fumble in 13 games as a freshman. King entered the 2022 season as a starter at cornerback. He declared for the 2024 NFL draft following the 2023 season.

== Professional career ==
Pre-draft measurables
Height	Weight	Arm length	Hand span	Wingspan	40-yard dash	10-yard split	20-yard split	20-yard shuttle	Vertical jump	Broad jump
5 ft 11 1/4 in (1.81 m)	191 lb (87 kg)	30 7/8 in (0.78 m)	8 3/4 in (0.22 m)	6 ft 2 1/4 in (1.89 m)	4.52 s	1.57 s	2.64 s	4.14 s	37.0 in (0.94 m)	10 ft 2 in (3.10 m)
All values from NFL Combine/Pro Day

=== Green Bay Packers ===
King was drafted by the Green Bay Packers in the seventh round with the 255th overall pick in the 2024 NFL draft. He signed his rookie contract on May 3. King was released by the Packers on August 27, and subsequently re-signed to the practice squad. On December 5, he was elevated to the gameday roster for Week 14.

King signed a reserve/future contract with Green Bay on January 13, 2025. On August 26, King was released by the Packers as part of final roster cuts.

=== Carolina Panthers ===
On August 27, 2025, King was signed to the Carolina Panthers' practice squad. He was promoted to the active roster on November 29, but waived three days later. On December 4, King was re-signed to the practice squad.

=== Arizona Cardinals ===
On December 23, 2025, King was signed by the Arizona Cardinals off of the Panthers' practice squad.

On August 30, 2026, King was waived by the Cardinals as a part of final roster cuts; he was re-signed to the team's practice squad the following day. On September 16, he was promoted to the active roster.

== Personal life ==
King's twin brother, Kobe, played at Penn State as a linebacker and was drafted by the Minnesota Vikings in 2025.
