= Tommy Eichenberg =

American football player (born 2001)

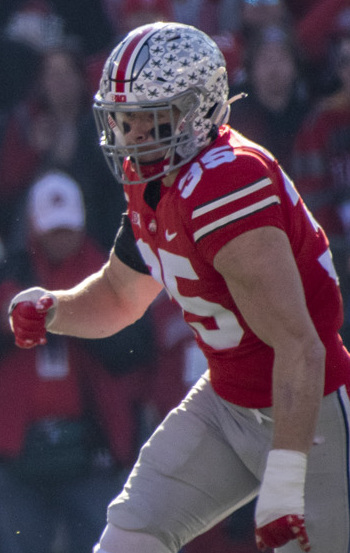
- Eichenberg with the Ohio State Buckeyes in 2022

No. 44 – Las Vegas Raiders
- Position: Linebacker
- Roster status: Active

Personal information
- Born: January 11, 2001 (age 25); Cleveland, Ohio, U.S.
- Listed height: 6 ft 2 in (1.88 m)
- Listed weight: 234 lb (106 kg)

Career information
- High school: Saint Ignatius (Cleveland)
- College: Ohio State (2019–2023)
- NFL draft: 2024: 5th round, 148th overall pick

Career history
- Las Vegas Raiders (2024–present)

Awards and highlights
- Big Ten Linebacker of the Year (2023); 2× First-team All-Big Ten (2022, 2023)

Career NFL statistics as of 2025
- Tackles: 49
- Pass deflections: 1
- Stats at Pro Football Reference

Tommy Eichenberg (born January 11, 2001) is an American professional football linebacker for the Las Vegas Raiders of the National Football League (NFL). He played college football for the Ohio State Buckeyes.

== Early life ==
Eichenberg grew up in Cleveland, Ohio and attended Saint Ignatius High School. As a senior, Eichenberg was named first team All-Ohio after making 126 tackles with eight sacks, 23 tackles for loss, and five passes broken up. He initially committed to play college football at Boston College, but re-opened his recruitment during his senior year. Eichenberg ultimately signed to play at Ohio State over offers from Michigan, Michigan State, Iowa, and Kentucky. He was a 4-star recruit.

== College career ==
Eichenberg redshirted his true freshman year after playing in four games. Eichenberg was named a starter at linebacker entering his junior year. He finished the season second on the team with 64 tackles. Eichenberg was named the defensive MVP of the 2022 Rose Bowl after making 17 total tackles as Ohio State beat Utah 48–45.

== Professional career ==
Pre-draft measurables
Height	Weight	Arm length	Hand span	Wingspan	20-yard shuttle	Three-cone drill	Vertical jump	Broad jump	Bench press
6 ft 2 3/8 in (1.89 m)	233 lb (106 kg)	31 5/8 in (0.80 m)	9 1/4 in (0.23 m)	6 ft 5 1/8 in (1.96 m)	4.24 s	7.02 s	32.5 in (0.83 m)	9 ft 8 in (2.95 m)	25 reps
All values from NFL Combine/Pro Day

Eichenberg was selected in the fifth round with the 148th overall pick in the 2024 NFL draft by the Las Vegas Raiders.

== NFL career statistics ==
Legend
**Bold**	Career high

=== Regular season ===
Year	Team	Games		Tackles					Interceptions						Fumbles				
Year	Team	GP	GS	Cmb	Solo	Ast	Sck	TFL	Int	Yds	Avg	Lng	TD	PD	FF	Fum	FR	Yds	TD
2024	LV	14	**1**	13	8	5	0.0	0	0	0	0.0	0	0	0	0	0	0	0	0
2025	LV	**17**	0	**36**	**21**	**15**	0.0	**1**	0	0	0.0	0	0	**1**	0	0	0	0	0
Career		31	1	49	29	20	0.0	1	0	0	0.0	0	0	1	0	0	0	0	0

== Personal life ==
Eichenberg's older brother, Liam, played college football at Notre Dame and currently plays in the National Football League for the Miami Dolphins.
