= 2024 Penn State Nittany Lions football team =

American college football season

2024 Penn State Nittany Lions football

Lambert-Meadowlands Trophy Fiesta Bowl champion

Big Ten Championship Game, L 37–45 vs. Oregon

CFP First Round, W 38–10 vs. SMU Fiesta Bowl (CFP Quarterfinal), W 31–14 vs. Boise State Orange Bowl (CFP Semifinal), L 24–27 vs. Notre Dame
- Conference: Big Ten Conference

Ranking
- Coaches: No. 5
- AP: No. 5
- Record: 13–3 (8–1 Big Ten)
- Head coach: James Franklin (11th season)
- Offensive coordinator: Andy Kotelnicki (1st season)
- Co-offensive coordinators: Ja'Juan Seider (1st season); Ty Howle (2nd season)
- Offensive scheme: Pro spread
- Defensive coordinator: Tom Allen (1st season)
- Co-defensive coordinator: Anthony Poindexter (4th season)
- Base defense: 4–2–5
- Captains: Drew Allar; Nick Dawkins; Dominic DeLuca; Kobe King; Riley Thompson; Kevin Winston Jr.
- Home stadium: Beaver Stadium

Uniform
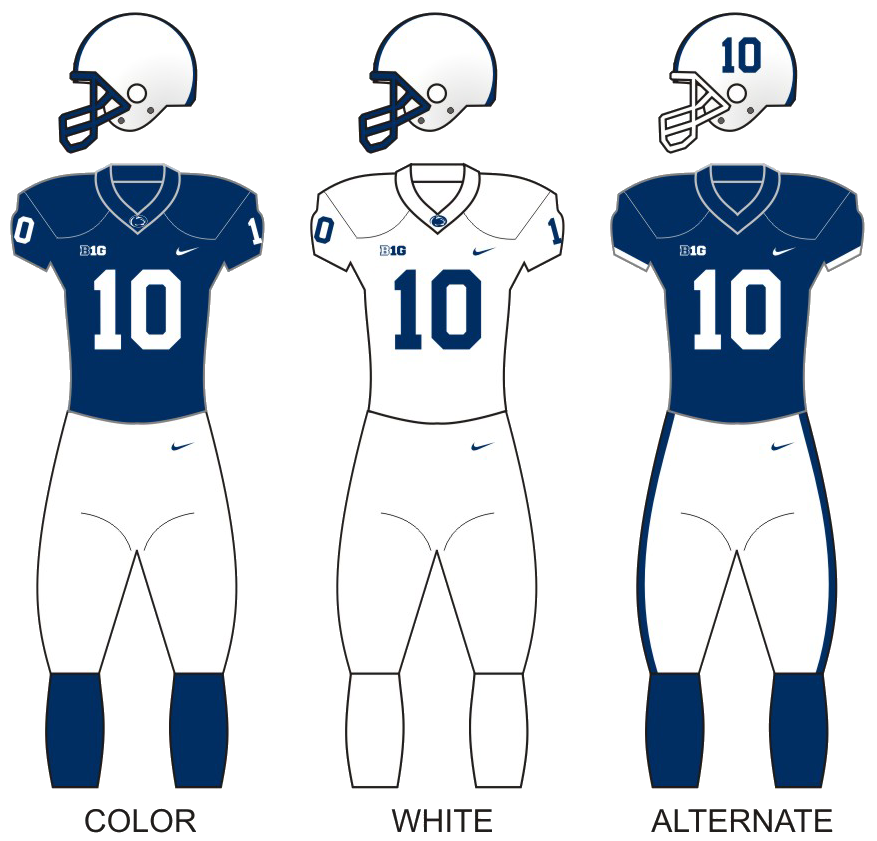

2024 Big Ten Conference football standings
	Conf.			Overall
Team	W		L	W		L
No. 3 Oregon y$^	9	–	0	13	–	1
No. 10 Indiana ^	8	–	1	11	–	2
No. 5 Penn State y^	8	–	1	13	–	3
No. 1 Ohio State #^	7	–	2	14	–	2
No. 16 Illinois	6	–	3	10	–	3
Iowa	6	–	3	8	–	5
Michigan	5	–	4	8	–	5
Minnesota	5	–	4	8	–	5
USC	4	–	5	7	–	6
Rutgers	4	–	5	7	–	6
Washington	4	–	5	6	–	7
Nebraska	3	–	6	7	–	6
UCLA	3	–	6	5	–	7
Wisconsin	3	–	6	5	–	7
Northwestern	2	–	7	4	–	8
Maryland	1	–	8	4	–	8
Michigan State†	0	–	6	0	–	7
Purdue	0	–	9	1	–	11
Championship: Oregon 45, Penn State 37
# – College Football Playoff champion; ^ – College Football Playoff participant; $ – Conference champion; y – Championship game participant; † — NCAA vacated all wins for Michigan State (5–7, 3–6); Rankings from AP Poll

The 2024 Penn State Nittany Lions football team represented Pennsylvania State University in the Big Ten Conference during the 2024 NCAA Division I FBS football season. The Nittany Lions were led by head coach James Franklin in his 11th year leading the program.

Their home stadium is Beaver Stadium in College Township, Pennsylvania, with a mailing address of University Park, Pennsylvania. The Penn State Nittany Lions football team drew an average home attendance of 108,379 in 2024.

Following a 44–7 win against Maryland and a Michigan win over Ohio State in the final week of the regular season, the Nittany Lions clinched their first Big Ten Championship appearance since 2016, which they lost to the Oregon Ducks. However, Penn State still clinched its first ever appearance in the College Football Playoff, in which they defeated No. 11 seed SMU 38–10 in the first round at home, then the No. 3 seed Boise State 31–14 in the Fiesta Bowl. They then faced No. 7 seed Notre Dame in the Orange Bowl for a spot in the CFP National Championship, but fell 27–24. The team concluded with a record of 13–3, making this Penn State's first ever 13-win season.

Penn State ranked No. 5 in the final rankings of both major polls, the program's first top-five finish since the 2005 season.

== Offseason ==
=== Transfers ===
==== Outgoing ====
Player	Position	Destination
Cristian Driver	WR	Minnesota
Alex Bacchetta	P	Rice
Jace Tutty (Walk-on)	CB	Youngstown State
Dante Cephas	WR	Kansas State
Jake Wilson (Walk-on)	EDGE	Unknown
Ibrahim Traore	OT	Toledo
Mason Stahl (Walk-on)	WR	Sacred Heart
KeAndre Lambert-Smith	WR	Auburn
Jordan van den Berg	DL	Georgia Tech
Malick Meiga	WR	Coastal Carolina
King Mack	S	Alabama
Malik McClain	WR	Arizona State
London Montgomery	RB	East Carolina
Davon Townley	EDGE	Missouri State
Golden Israel-Achumba	OG	Unknown
David Kency Jr. (Walk-on)	RB	LSU
Rodney McGraw	DE	Western Michigan

==== Incoming ====
Player	Position	Former Team
Chase Meyer	K	Tulsa
Julian Fleming	WR	Ohio State
Jordan Mayer	OLB	Wisconsin
A. J. Harris	CB	Georgia
Jalen Kimber	CB	Florida
Nolan Rucci	OT	Wisconsin

== Schedule ==
Date	Time	Opponent	Rank	Site	TV	Result	Attendance
August 31	12:00 p.m.	at West Virginia*	No. 8	Milan Puskar Stadium; Morgantown, WV (rivalry, Big Noon Kickoff)	FOX	W 34–12	62,084
September 7	12:00 p.m.	Bowling Green*	No. 8	Beaver Stadium; State College, PA	BTN	W 34–27	103,861
September 21	3:30 p.m.	Kent State*	No. 10	Beaver Stadium; State College, PA	BTN	W 56–0	109,526
September 28	7:30 p.m.	No. 19 Illinois^{†}	No. 9	Beaver Stadium; State College, PA	NBC	W 21–7	109,911
October 5	12:00 p.m.	UCLA	No. 7	Beaver Stadium; State College, PA (Big Noon Kickoff)	FOX	W 27–11	110,047
October 12	3:30 p.m.	at USC	No. 4	Los Angeles Memorial Coliseum; Los Angeles, CA	CBS	W 33–30 ^{OT}	75,250
October 26	7:30 p.m.	at Wisconsin	No. 3	Camp Randall Stadium; Madison, WI	NBC	W 28–13	76,403
November 2	12:00 p.m.	No. 4 Ohio State	No. 3	Beaver Stadium; State College, PA (rivalry, College GameDay, Big Noon Kickoff)	FOX	L 13–20	111,030
November 9	8:00 p.m.	Washington	No. 6	Beaver Stadium; State College, PA (White Out)	Peacock	W 35–6	110,233
November 16	3:30 p.m.	at Purdue	No. 4	Ross–Ade Stadium; West Lafayette, IN	CBS	W 49–10	58,346
November 23	3:30 p.m.	at Minnesota	No. 4	Huntington Bank Stadium; Minneapolis, MN (Governor's Victory Bell)	CBS	W 26–25	44,266
November 30	3:30 p.m.	Maryland	No. 4	Beaver Stadium; State College, PA (rivalry)	BTN	W 44–7	104,044
December 7	8:00 p.m.	vs. No. 1 Oregon*	No. 3	Lucas Oil Stadium; Indianapolis, IN (Big Ten Championship Game)	CBS	L 37–45	67,469
December 21	12:00 p.m.	(11) No. 10 SMU*	(6) No. 4	Beaver Stadium; State College, PA (CFP First Round, White Out)	TNT/Max	W 38–10	106,013
December 31	7:30 p.m.	vs. (3) No. 9 Boise State*	(6) No. 4	State Farm Stadium; Glendale, AZ (Fiesta Bowl—CFP Quarterfinal)	ESPN	W 31–14	63,854
January 9, 2025	7:30 p.m.	vs. (7) No. 5 Notre Dame*	(6) No. 4	Hard Rock Stadium; Miami Gardens, FL (Orange Bowl—CFP Semifinal)	ESPN	L 24–27	66,881
*Non-conference game; ^{†}Homecoming; Rankings from AP Poll (and CFP Rankings, after November 5) - Released prior to game; All times are in Eastern time; Source:

== Rankings ==
Ranking movements Legend: ██ Increase in ranking ██ Decrease in ranking т = Tied with team above or below
	Week																
Poll	Pre	1	2	3	4	5	6	7	8	9	10	11	12	13	14	15	Final
AP	8	8	8	10	9	7	4	3	3	3	6	4	4	4	3	5	5
Coaches	9	8	7	8т	8	7	5	3	3	3	7	5	4	4	3	5	5
CFP	Not released										6	4	4	4	3	4	Not released

== Game summaries ==
=== at West Virginia ===
No. 8 Penn State Nittany Lions (0–0) vs West Virginia Mountaineers (0–0)

Quarter	1	2	3	4	Total
No. 8 Nittany Lions	0	20	7	7	34
Mountaineers	0	6	0	6	12

at Mountaineer Field at Milan Puskar Stadium • Morgantown, West Virginia

- Date: August 31
- Game time: 12:00 p.m. EDT
- Game weather: 87 °F (31 °C); mostly sunny, lightning/weather delay during halftime
- Game attendance: 62,084
- Referee: David Alvarez
- TV announcers (FOX): Gus Johnson (play-by-play), Joel Klatt (color commentator), and Jenny Taft (sideline reporter)
- ESPN box score, GoPSUsports.com box score

Game information

First quarter

No scoring

Second quarter

- PSU – Harrison Wallace III, 50-yard TD pass from Drew Allar, two-point conversion pass incomplete, 14:53 (PSU 6–0)
- PSU – Kaytron Allen, 20-yard TD pass from Allar, Sander Sahaydak kick, 9:46 (PSU 13–0)
- WVU – Michael Hayes II, 38-yard field goal, 6:15 (PSU 13–3)
- WVU – Hayes, 39-yard field goal, 0:37 (PSU 13–6)
- PSU – Wallace, 18-yard TD pass from Allar, Sahaydak kick, 0:06 (PSU 20–6)

Third quarter

- PSU – Nicholas Singleton, 40-yard TD run, Sahaydak kick, 10:16 (PSU 27–6)

Fourth quarter

- WVU – CJ Donaldson Jr, 1-yard TD run, two-point conversion failed, 12:49 (PSU 27–12)
- PSU – Tyler Warren, 19-yard TD pass from Beau Pribula, Sahaydak kick, 9:00 (PSU 34–12)

Statistics	PSU	WVU
First downs	21	19
Total yards	60–457	66–246
Rushing yards	42–222	37–85
Passing yards	235	161
Passing: comp–att–int	12–18–0	15–29–1
Time of possession	30:25	29:35

Team	Category	Player	Statistics
Penn State	Passing	Drew Allar	11/17, 216 yards, 3 TD
Penn State	Rushing	Nicholas Singleton	13 carries, 114 yards, TD
Penn State	Receiving	Harrison Wallace III	5 receptions, 117 yards, 2 TD
West Virginia	Passing	Garrett Greene	15/28, 161 yards,
West Virginia	Rushing	CJ Donaldson Jr	12 carries, 42 yards, TD
West Virginia	Receiving	Preston Fox	2 receptions, 41 yards

=== vs Bowling Green ===
Bowling Green Falcons (1–0) vs No. 8 Penn State Nittany Lions (1–0)

Quarter	1	2	3	4	Total
Falcons	10	14	0	3	27
No. 8 Nittany Lions	7	13	7	7	34

at Beaver Stadium • State College, Pennsylvania

- Date: September 7
- Game time: 12:00 p.m. EDT
- Game weather: 64 °F (18 °C), sunny
- Game attendance: 103,861
- Referee: Larry Smith
- TV announcers (BTN): Chris Vosters (play-by-play), Matt Millen (color commentator), and Dannie Rodgers (sideline reporter)
- ESPN box score, GoPSUsports.com box score

Game information

First quarter

- BGSU – Harold Fannin Jr., 6-yard TD pass from Connor Bazelak, Jackson Kleather kick, 12:39 (BGSU 7–0)
- PSU – Drew Allar, 5-yard TD run, Sander Sahaydak kick, 10:14 (TIE 7–7)
- BGSU – Kleather, 33-yard field goal, 4:50 (BGSU 10–7)

Second quarter

- BGSU – Malcolm Johnson Jr., 15-yard TD pass from Bazelak, Kleather kick, 12:48 (BGSU 17–7)
- PSU – Omari Evans, 29-yard TD pass from Allar, Sahaydak kick, 11:48 (BGSU 17–14)
- PSU – Sahaydak, 43-yard field goal, 5:28 (TIE 17–17)
- BGSU – Jamal Johnson, 41-yard TD run, Kleather kick, 3:32 (BGSU 24–17)
- PSU – Sahaydak, 28-yard field goal, 0:10 (BGSU 24–20)

Third quarter

- PSU – Nicholas Singleton, 14-yard TD pass from Allar, Sahaydak kick, 6:13 (PSU 27–24)

Fourth quarter

- PSU – Singleton, 41-yard TD run, Sahaydak kick, 4:09 (PSU 34–24)
- BGSU – Kleather, 42-yard field goal, 0:47 (PSU 34–27)

Statistics	BGSU	PSU
First downs	20	21
Total yards	66–375	57–438
Rushing yards	26–121	37–234
Passing yards	254	204
Passing: comp–att–int	25–40–2	13–20–1
Time of possession	32:00	28:00

Team	Category	Player	Statistics
Bowling Green	Passing	Connor Bazelak	25/39, 254 yards, 2 TD, 2 INT
Bowling Green	Rushing	Jaison Patterson	16 carries, 57 yards
Bowling Green	Receiving	Harold Fannin Jr.	11 receptions, 137 yards, TD
Penn State	Passing	Drew Allar	13/20, 204 yards, 2 TD, INT
Penn State	Rushing	Nicholas Singleton	13 carries, 119 yards, TD
Penn State	Receiving	Tyler Warren	8 receptions, 146 yards

=== vs Kent State ===
Kent State Golden Flashes (0–3) vs No. 10 Penn State Nittany Lions (2–0)

Quarter	1	2	3	4	Total
Golden Flashes	0	0	0	0	0
No. 10 Nittany Lions	7	21	14	14	56

at Beaver Stadium • State College, Pennsylvania

- Date: September 21
- Game time: 3:30 p.m. EDT
- Game weather: 77 °F (25 °C), light rain then sunny
- Game attendance: 109,526
- Referee: Ron Snodgrass
- TV announcers (BTN): Jeff Levering (play-by-play), Jake Butt (color commentator), and Brooke Fletcher (sideline reporter)
- ESPN box score, GoPSUsports.com box score

Game information

First quarter

- PSU – Tyler Warren, 16-yard TD pass from Drew Allar, Sander Sahaydak kick, 2:38 (PSU 7–0)

Second quarter

- PSU – Nicholas Singleton, 17-yard TD pass from Warren, Sahaydak kick, 5:49 (PSU 14–0)
- PSU – Liam Clifford, 14-yard TD pass from Allar, Sahaydak kick, 1:29 (PSU 21–0)
- PSU – Allar, 5-yard TD run, Sahaydak kick, 0:15 (PSU 28–0)

Third quarter

- PSU – Omari Evans, 59-yard TD pass from Allar, Sahaydak kick, 13:13 (PSU 35–0)
- PSU – Khalil Dinkins, 13-yard TD pass from Beau Pribula, Sahaydak kick, 4:55 (PSU 42–0)

Fourth quarter

- PSU – Cam Wallace, 1-yard TD run, Sahaydak kick, 9:21 (PSU 49–0)
- PSU – Pribula, 1-yard TD run, Ryan Barker kick, 1:25 (PSU 56–0)

Statistics	KENT	PSU
First downs	6	40
Total yards	43–67	81–718
Rushing yards	30–49	50–309
Passing yards	18	409
Passing: comp–att–int	2–13–0	24–31–1
Time of possession	24:19	35:41

Team	Category	Player	Statistics
Kent State	Passing	JD Sherrod	2/6, 18 yards
Kent State	Rushing	Ayden Harris	10 carries, 20 yards
Kent State	Receiving	Ardell Banks	1 reception, 13 yards
Penn State	Passing	Drew Allar	17/21, 309 yards, 3 TD
Penn State	Rushing	Nicholas Singleton	11 carries, 81 yards
Penn State	Receiving	Omari Evans	4 receptions, 116 yards, TD

=== vs No. 19 Illinois ===
No. 19 Illinois Fighting Illini (4–0) vs No. 9 Penn State Nittany Lions (3–0)

Quarter	1	2	3	4	Total
No. 19 Fighting Illini	7	0	0	0	7
No. 9 Nittany Lions	7	0	7	7	21

at Beaver Stadium • State College, Pennsylvania

- Date: September 28
- Game time: 7:30 p.m. EDT
- Game weather: 66 °F (19 °C), cloudy
- Game attendance: 109,911
- Referee: Jeffrey Servinski
- TV announcers (NBC): Noah Eagle (play-by-play), Todd Blackledge (color commentator), and Kathryn Tappen (sideline reporter)
- ESPN box score, GoPSUsports.com box score

Game information

First quarter

- UI – Carson Goda, 4-yard TD pass from Luke Altmyer, David Olano kick, 9:36 (UI 7–0)
- PSU – Tyler Warren, 3-yard TD run, Sander Sahaydak kick, 5:34 (TIE 7–7)

Second quarter

No scoring

Third quarter

- PSU – Nicholas Singleton, 4-yard TD run, Sahaydak kick, 8:38 (PSU 14–7)

Fourth quarter

- PSU – Kaytron Allen, 5-yard TD run, Ryan Barker kick, 1:55 (PSU 21–7)

Statistics	ILL	PSU
First downs	17	24
Total yards	57–219	65–374
Rushing yards	32–34	44–239
Passing yards	185	135
Passing: comp–att–int	16–25–1	15–21–0
Time of possession	26:11	33:49

Team	Category	Player	Statistics
Illinois	Passing	Luke Altmyer	16/25, 185 yards, TD, INT
Illinois	Rushing	Kaden Feagin	13 carries, 64 yards
Illinois	Receiving	Zakhari Franklin	4 receptions, 49 yards
Penn State	Passing	Drew Allar	15/21, 135 yards
Penn State	Rushing	Kaytron Allen	18 carries, 102 yards, TD
Penn State	Receiving	Harrison Wallace III	4 receptions, 50 yards

=== vs UCLA ===
UCLA Bruins (1–3) vs No. 7 Penn State Nittany Lions (4–0)

Quarter	1	2	3	4	Total
Bruins	0	3	0	8	11
No. 7 Nittany Lions	0	14	10	3	27

at Beaver Stadium • State College, Pennsylvania

- Date: October 5
- Game time: 12:00 p.m. EDT
- Game weather: 65 °F (18 °C), sunny
- Game attendance: 110,047
- Referee: Tim O'Dey
- TV announcers (FOX): Gus Johnson (play-by-play), Joel Klatt (color commentator), and Jenny Taft (sideline reporter)
- ESPN box score, GoPSUsports.com box score

Game information

First quarter

No scoring

Second quarter

- PSU – Drew Allar, 1-yard TD run, Ryan Barker kick, 6:40 (PSU 7–0)
- UCLA – Mateen Bhaghani, 25-yard field goal, 2:51 (PSU 7–3)
- PSU – Tyler Warren, 5-yard TD pass from Allar, Barker kick, 0:20 (PSU 14–3)

Third quarter

- PSU – Barker, 25-yard field goal, 8:36 (PSU 17–3)
- PSU – Kaytron Allen, 1-yard TD run, Barker kick, 2:57 (PSU 24–3)

Fourth quarter

- PSU – Barker, 40-yard field goal, 8:17 (PSU 27–3)
- UCLA – Logan Loya, 1-yard TD pass from Justyn Martin, Keegan Jones pass from Martin for two-point conversion, 0:16 (PSU 27–11)

Statistics	UCLA	PSU
First downs	14	18
Total yards	59–260	54–322
Rushing yards	29–93	30–85
Passing yards	167	237
Passing: comp–att–int	22–30–0	17–24–0
Time of possession	32:57	27:03

Team	Category	Player	Statistics
UCLA	Passing	Justyn Martin	22/30, 167 yards, TD
UCLA	Rushing	Jalen Berger	9 carries, 38 yards
UCLA	Receiving	T.J. Harden	5 receptions, 59 yards
Penn State	Passing	Drew Allar	17/24, 237 yards, TD
Penn State	Rushing	Kaytron Allen	21 carries, 78 yards, TD
Penn State	Receiving	Liam Clifford	3 receptions, 107 yards

=== at USC ===
No. 4 Penn State Nittany Lions (5–0) vs USC Trojans (3–2)

Quarter	1	2	3	4	OT	Total
No. 4 Nittany Lions	3	3	14	10	3	33
Trojans	7	13	3	7	0	30

at Los Angeles Memorial Coliseum • Los Angeles, California

- Date: October 12
- Game time: 3:30 p.m. EDT
- Game weather: 78 °F (26 °C), sunny
- Game attendance: 75,250
- Referee: Jerry McGinn
- TV announcers (CBS): Brad Nessler (play-by-play), Gary Danielson (color commentator), and Jenny Dell (sideline reporter)
- ESPN box score, GoPSUsports.com box score

Game information

First quarter

- PSU – Ryan Barker, 34-yard field goal, 4:53 (PSU 3–0)
- USC – Quinten Joyner, 75-yard TD run, Michael Lantz kick, 4:38 (USC 7–3)

Second quarter

- USC – Joyner, 9-yard TD pass from Miller Moss, Lantz kick, 13:33 (USC 14–3)
- USC – Lantz, 45-yard field goal, 10:05 (USC 17–3)
- PSU – Barker, 33-yard field goal, 2:46 (USC 17–6)
- USC – Lantz, 47-yard field goal, 0:07 (USC 20–6)

Third quarter

- PSU – Tyler Warren, 32-yard TD pass from Drew Allar, Barker kick, 12:52 (USC 20–13)
- PSU – Kaytron Allen, 1-yard TD run, Barker kick, 4:42 (TIE 20–20)
- USC – Lantz, 39-yard field goal, 0:28 (USC 23–20)

Fourth quarter

- PSU – Barker, 20-yard field goal, 10:50 (TIE 23–23)
- USC – Kyron Hudson, 5-yard TD pass from Moss, Lantz kick, 5:56 (USC 30–23)
- PSU – Nicholas Singleton, 14-yard TD pass from Allar, Barker kick, 2:53 (TIE 30–30)

Overtime

- PSU – Barker, 36-yard field goal, (PSU 33–30)

Statistics	PSU	USC
First downs	28	16
Total yards	75–518	58–409
Rushing yards	31–118	24–189
Passing yards	400	220
Passing: comp–att–int	31–44–3	20–34–1
Time of possession	32:22	27:38

Team	Category	Player	Statistics
Penn State	Passing	Drew Allar	30/43, 391 yards, 2 TD, 3 INT
Penn State	Rushing	Kaytron Allen	16 carries, 56 yards, TD
Penn State	Receiving	Tyler Warren	17 receptions, 224 yards, TD
USC	Passing	Miller Moss	20/34, 220 yards, 2 TD, INT
USC	Rushing	Woody Marks	20 carries, 111 yards
USC	Receiving	Makai Lemon	6 receptions, 73 yards

=== at Wisconsin ===
No. 3 Penn State Nittany Lions (6–0) vs Wisconsin Badgers (5–2)

Quarter	1	2	3	4	Total
No. 3 Nittany Lions	0	7	7	14	28
Badgers	3	7	3	0	13

at Camp Randall Stadium • Madison, Wisconsin

- Date: October 26
- Game time: 7:30 p.m. EDT
- Game weather: 68 °F (20 °C), clear
- Game attendance: 76,403
- Referee: Bryan Banks
- TV announcers (NBC): Noah Eagle (play-by-play), Todd Blackledge (color commentator), and Kathryn Tappen (sideline reporter)
- ESPN box score, GoPSUsports.com box score

Game information

First quarter

- UW – Nathanial Vakos, 50-yard field goal, 11:05 (UW 3–0)

Second quarter

- PSU – Nicholas Singleton, 6-yard TD pass from Drew Allar, Ryan Barker kick, 14:37 (PSU 7–3)
- UW – Tawee Walker, 1-yard TD run, Vakos kick, 1:23 (UW 10–7)

Third quarter

- PSU – Jaylen Reed, 19-yard interception return for TD, Barker kick, 6:29 (PSU 14–10)
- UW – Vakos, 32-yard field goal, 2:44 (PSU 14–13)

Fourth quarter

- PSU – Khalil Dinkins, 1-yard TD pass from Beau Pribula, Barker kick, 10:01 (PSU 21–13)
- PSU – Kaytron Allen, 24-yard TD run, Barker kick, 3:10 (PSU 28–13)

Statistics	PSU	WIS
First downs	22	16
Total yards	66–419	69–298
Rushing yards	35–173	27–81
Passing yards	246	217
Passing: comp–att–int	25–31–0	22–42–1
Time of possession	34:31	25:29

Team	Category	Player	Statistics
Penn State	Passing	Drew Allar	14/18, 148 yards, TD
Penn State	Rushing	Kaytron Allen	11 carries, 86 yards, TD
Penn State	Receiving	Tyler Warren	7 receptions, 46 yards
Wisconsin	Passing	Braedyn Locke	22/42, 217 yards, INT
Wisconsin	Rushing	Tawee Walker	22 carries, 59 yards, TD
Wisconsin	Receiving	Will Pauling	8 receptions, 79 yards

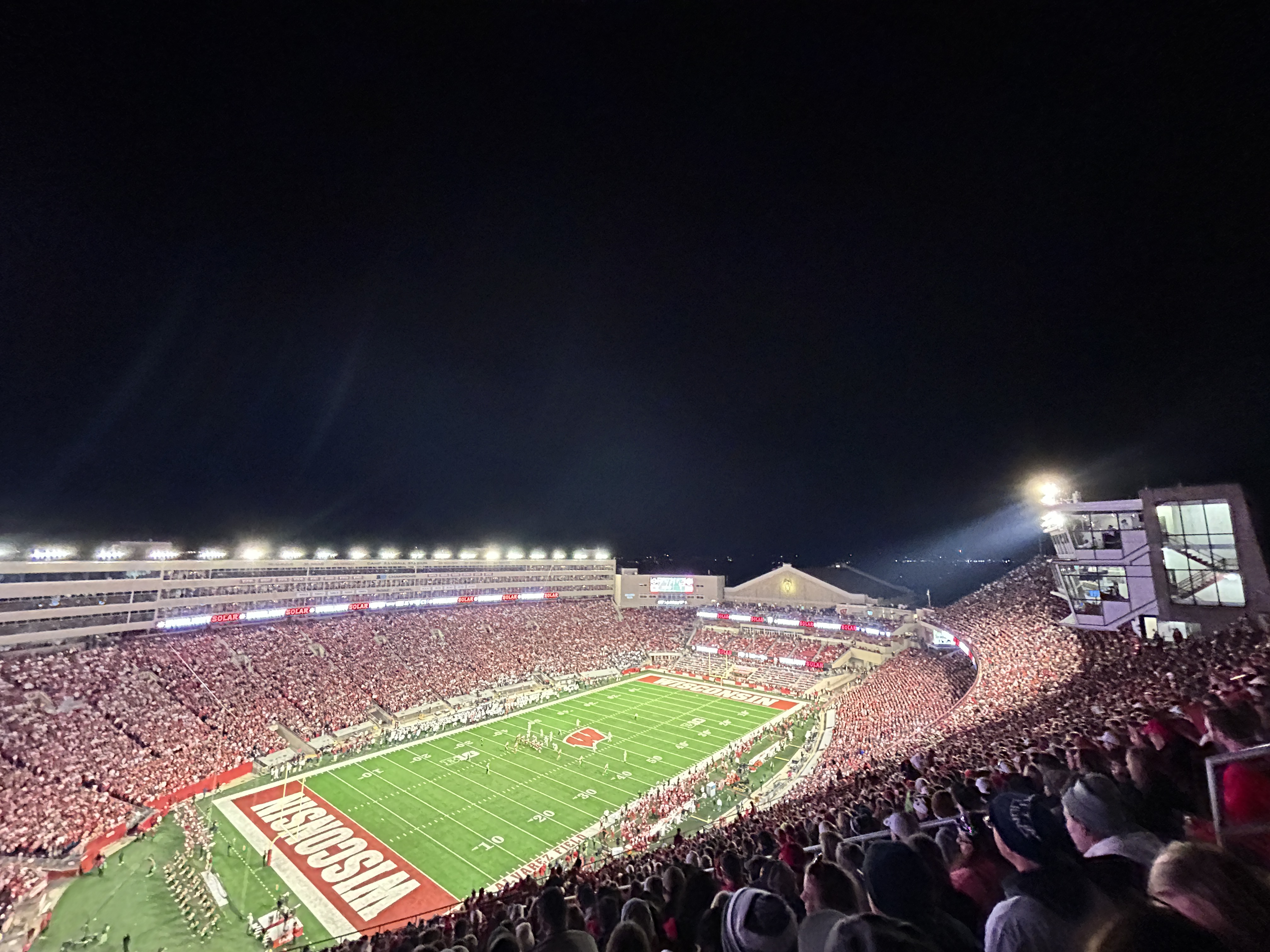
Against Wisconsin at Camp Randall Stadium

=== vs No. 4 Ohio State ===
No. 4 Ohio State Buckeyes (6–1) vs No. 3 Penn State Nittany Lions (7–0)

Quarter	1	2	3	4	Total
No. 4 Buckeyes	7	7	3	3	20
No. 3 Nittany Lions	10	0	3	0	13

at Beaver Stadium • State College, Pennsylvania

- Date: November 2
- Game time: 12:00 p.m. EDT
- Game weather: 52 °F (11 °C), sunny
- Game attendance: 111,030
- Referee: Kole Knueppel
- TV announcers (FOX): Gus Johnson (play-by-play), Joel Klatt (color commentator), and Jenny Taft (sideline reporter)
- ESPN box score, GoPSUsports.com box score

Game information

First quarter

- PSU – Ryan Barker, 29-yard field goal, 6:54 (PSU 3–0)
- PSU – Zion Tracy, 31-yard interception return for TD, Barker kick, 5:37 (PSU 10–0)
- OSU – Emeka Egbuka, 25-yard TD pass from Will Howard, Jayden Fielding kick, 1:59 (PSU 10–7)

Second quarter

- OSU – Brandon Inniss, 21-yard TD pass from Howard, Fielding kick, 11:54 (OSU 14–10)

Third quarter

- OSU – Fielding, 46-yard field goal, 10:40 (OSU 17–10)
- PSU – Barker, 44-yard field goal, 5:03 (OSU 17–13)

Fourth quarter

- OSU – Fielding, 39-yard field goal, 10:13 (OSU 20–13)

Statistics	OSU	PSU
First downs	21	15
Total yards	64–358	53–270
Rushing yards	40–176	32–120
Passing yards	182	150
Passing: comp–att–int	16–24–1	13–21–1
Time of possession	31:29	28:31

Team	Category	Player	Statistics
Ohio State	Passing	Will Howard	16/24, 182 yards, 2 TD, INT
Ohio State	Rushing	Quinshon Judkins	14 carries, 95 yards
Ohio State	Receiving	Jeremiah Smith	4 receptions, 55 yards
Penn State	Passing	Drew Allar	12/20, 146 yards, INT
Penn State	Rushing	Tyler Warren	3 carries, 47 yards
Penn State	Receiving	Nicholas Singleton	6 receptions, 54 yards

=== vs Washington ===
Washington Huskies (5–4) vs No. 6 Penn State Nittany Lions (7–1)

Quarter	1	2	3	4	Total
Huskies	0	0	3	3	6
No. 6 Nittany Lions	7	21	0	7	35

at Beaver Stadium • State College, Pennsylvania

- Date: November 9
- Game time: 8:00 p.m. EST
- Game weather: 46 °F (8 °C)
- Game attendance: 110,233
- Referee: Mark Kluczynski
- TV announcers (Peacock): Paul Burmeister (play-by-play), Colt McCoy (color commentator), and Zora Stephenson (sideline reporter)
- ESPN box score, GoPSUsports.com box score

Game information

First quarter

- PSU – Beau Pribula, 8-yard TD run, Ryan Barker kick, 3:48 (PSU 7–0)

Second quarter

- PSU – Tyler Warren, 2-yard TD run, Barker kick, 9:22 (PSU 14–0)
- PSU – Warren, 2-yard TD run, Barker kick, 3:23 (PSU 21–0)
- PSU – Julian Fleming, 8-yard TD pass from Drew Allar, Barker kick, 0:23 (PSU 28–0)

Third quarter

- UW – Grady Gross, 24-yard field goal, 9:47 (PSU 28–3)

Fourth quarter

- UW – Gross, 35-yard field goal, 13:33 (PSU 28–6)
- PSU – Kaytron Allen, 1-yard TD run, Barker kick, 4:50 (PSU 34–6)

Statistics	WASH	PSU
First downs	14	24
Total yards	56–193	70–486
Rushing yards	33–74	40–266
Passing yards	119	220
Passing: comp–att–int	16–23–1	20–30–0
Time of possession	28:52	31:08

Team	Category	Player	Statistics
Washington	Passing	Will Rogers	10/13, 59 yards, INT
Washington	Rushing	Demond Williams Jr.	10 carries, 38 yards
Washington	Receiving	Giles Jackson	5 receptions, 23 yards
Penn State	Passing	Drew Allar	20/28, 220 yards, TD
Penn State	Rushing	Kaytron Allen	20 carries, 98 yards, TD
Penn State	Receiving	Tyler Warren	8 receptions, 75 yards

=== at Purdue ===
No. 4 Penn State Nittany Lions (8–1) vs Purdue Boilermakers (1–8)

Quarter	1	2	3	4	Total
No. 4 Nittany Lions	14	7	21	7	49
Boilermakers	0	3	0	7	10

at Ross-Ade Stadium • West Lafayette, Indiana

- Date: November 16
- Game time: 3:30 p.m. EST
- Game weather: 53 °F (12 °C), sunny
- Game attendance: 58,346
- Referee: Jerry McGinn
- TV announcers (CBS): Brad Nessler (play-by-play), Gary Danielson (color commentator), and Jenny Dell (sideline reporter)
- ESPN box score, GoPSUsports.com box score

Game information

First quarter

- PSU – Kaytron Allen, 2-yard TD pass from Drew Allar, Ryan Barker kick, 10:08 (PSU 7–0)
- PSU – Tyler Warren, 15-yard TD pass from Allar, Barker kick, 2:31 (PSU 14–0)

Second quarter

- PU – Ben Freehill, 22-yard field goal, 8:47 (PSU 14–3)
- PSU – Nicholas Singleton, 10-yard TD run, Barker kick, 6:04 (PSU 21–3)

Third quarter

- PSU – Warren, 48-yard TD run, Barker kick, 11:26 (PSU 28–3)
- PSU – Harrison Wallace III, 46-yard TD pass from Allar, Barker kick, 4:42 (PSU 35–3)
- PSU – Beau Pribula, 49-yard TD run, Barker kick, 0:32 (PSU 42–3)

Fourth quarter

- PU – Max Klare, 20-yard TD pass from Ryan Browne, Freehill kick, 9:50 (PSU 42–10)
- PSU – Luke Reynolds, 24-yard TD pass from Pribula, Barker kick, 1:51 (PSU 49–10)

Statistics	PSU	PUR
First downs	23	16
Total yards	61–539	59–302
Rushing yards	34–234	28–85
Passing yards	305	217
Passing: comp–att–int	22–27–0	15–31–0
Time of possession	31:20	28:40

Team	Category	Player	Statistics
Penn State	Passing	Drew Allar	17/19, 247 yards, 3 TD
Penn State	Rushing	Tyler Warren	3 carries, 63 yards, TD
Penn State	Receiving	Tyler Warren	8 receptions, 127 yards, TD
Purdue	Passing	Hudson Card	11/20, 151 yards
Purdue	Rushing	Devin Mockobee	11 carries, 40 yards
Purdue	Receiving	Max Klare	7 receptions, 91 yards, TD

=== at Minnesota ===
No. 4 Penn State Nittany Lions (9–1) vs Minnesota Golden Gophers (6–4)

Quarter	1	2	3	4	Total
No. 4 Nittany Lions	0	16	7	3	26
Golden Gophers	7	12	3	3	25

at Huntington Bank Stadium • Minneapolis, Minnesota

- Date: November 23
- Game time: 3:30 p.m. EST
- Game weather: 41 °F (5 °C), mostly cloudy
- Game attendance: 44,266
- Referee: Chris Coyle
- TV announcers (CBS): Brad Nessler (play-by-play), Gary Danielson (color commentator), and Jenny Dell (sideline reporter)
- ESPN box score, GoPSUsports.com box score

Game information

First quarter

- UM – Marcus Major, 20-yard TD run, Dragan Kesich kick, 8:57 (UM 7–0)

Second quarter

- UM – Kesich, 48-yard field goal, 12:56 (UM 10–0)
- PSU – Omari Evans, 45-yard TD pass from Drew Allar, Ryan Barker kick, 10:48 (UM 10–7)
- PSU – Barker, 45-yard field goal, 7:50 (TIE 10–10)
- UM – Jameson Geers, 21-yard TD pass from Max Brosmer, Kesich kick, 1:03 (UM 17–10)
- PSU – Allar, 4-yard TD run, kick blocked, 0:19 (UM 17–16)
- UM – Ethan Robinson, PAT blocked, 88-yard run back for two-point defensive conversion, 0:19 (UM 19–16)

Third quarter

- UM – Kesich, 42-yard field goal, 9:59 (UM 22–16)
- PSU – Nicholas Singleton, 12-yard TD run, Barker kick, 3:43 (PSU 23–22)

Fourth quarter

- PSU – Barker, 32-yard field goal, 11:51 (PSU 26–22)
- UM – Kesich, 26-yard field goal, 5:48 (PSU 26–25)

Statistics	PSU	MINN
First downs	20	18
Total yards	61–361	59–281
Rushing yards	33–117	36–106
Passing yards	244	175
Passing: comp–att–int	21–28–0	15–23–1
Time of possession	25:49	34:11

Team	Category	Player	Statistics
Penn State	Passing	Drew Allar	21/28, 244 yards, TD
Penn State	Rushing	Nicholas Singleton	13 carries, 63 yards, TD
Penn State	Receiving	Tyler Warren	8 receptions, 102 yards
Minnesota	Passing	Max Brosmer	15/23, 175 yards, TD, INT
Minnesota	Rushing	Darius Taylor	17 carries, 58 yards
Minnesota	Receiving	Daniel Jackson	6 receptions, 90 yards

=== vs Maryland ===
Maryland Terrapins (4–7) vs No. 4 Penn State Nittany Lions (10–1)

Quarter	1	2	3	4	Total
Terrapins	7	0	0	0	7
No. 4 Nittany Lions	3	28	0	13	44

at Beaver Stadium • State College, Pennsylvania

- Date: November 30
- Game time: 3:30 p.m. EST
- Game weather: 27 °F (−3 °C), cloudy, snow showers
- Game attendance: 104,044
- Referee: Mark Kluczynski
- TV announcers (BTN): Jeff Levering (play-by-play), Jake Butt (color commentator), and Brooke Fletcher (sideline reporter)
- ESPN box score, GoPSUSports.com box score

Game information

First quarter

- UM – Kaden Prather, 25-yard TD pass from MJ Morris, Jack Howes kick, 14:46 (UM 7–0)
- PSU – Ryan Barker, 49-yard field goal, 12:47 (UM 7–3)

Second quarter

- PSU – Nicholas Singleton, 2-yard TD run, Barker kick, 12:53 (PSU 10–7)
- PSU – Drew Allar, 1-yard TD run, Barker kick, 10:11 (PSU 17–7)
- PSU – Beau Pribula, 1-yard TD run, Barker kick, 6:53 (PSU 24–7)
- PSU – Tyler Warren, 7-yard TD pass from Allar, Barker kick, 1:46 (PSU 31–7)

Third quarter

No scoring

Fourth quarter

- PSU – Singleton, 18-yard TD run, Barker kick, 14:14 (PSU 38–7)
- PSU – Tyseer Denmark, 15-yard TD pass from Pribula, no attempt, 0:00 (PSU 44–7)

Statistics	MD	PSU
First downs	13	24
Total yards	57–194	79–412
Rushing yards	31–72	49–219
Passing yards	122	193
Passing: comp–att–int	15–26–3	20–30–0
Time of possession	27:20	32:40

Team	Category	Player	Statistics
Maryland	Passing	MJ Morris	14/24, 112 yards, TD, 3 INT
Maryland	Rushing	Roman Hemby	13 carries, 64 yards
Maryland	Receiving	Tai Felton	4 receptions, 27 yards
Penn State	Passing	Drew Allar	17/26, 171 yards, TD
Penn State	Rushing	Nicholas Singleton	13 carries, 87 yards, 2 TD
Penn State	Receiving	Tyler Warren	6 receptions, 68 yards, TD

=== vs No. 1 Oregon (Big Ten Championship Game) ===
2024 Big Ten Championship Game
No. 3 Penn State Nittany Lions (11–1) vs. No. 1 Oregon Ducks (12–0)

Quarter	1	2	3	4	Total
No. 3 Nittany Lions	10	14	0	13	37
No. 1 Ducks	14	17	7	7	45

at Lucas Oil Stadium • Indianapolis, Indiana

- Date: December 7
- Game time: 8:00 p.m. EST
- Game weather: indoors, roof closed
- Game attendance: 67,469
- Referee: Kole Knueppel
- TV announcers (CBS/Compass Media): Brad Nessler (play-by-play), Gary Danielson (color commentator), and Jenny Dell (sideline reporter)/Gregg Daniels (play-by-play) and Chad Brown (analyst)
- ESPN box score, GoPSUSports.com box score

Game information

First quarter

- UO – Kenyon Sadiq, 28-yard TD pass from Dillon Gabriel, Atticus Sappington kick, 10:40 (UO 7–0)
- PSU – Ryan Barker, 33-yard field goal, 7:30 (UO 7–3)
- UO – Sadiq, 2-yard TD pass from Gabriel, Sappington kick, 3:21 (UO 14–3)
- PSU – Nicholas Singleton, 22-yard TD pass from Drew Allar, Barker kick, 1:24 (UO 14–10)

Second quarter

- UO – Terrance Ferguson, 4-yard TD pass from Gabriel, Sappington kick, 13:04 (UO 21–10)
- UO – Jordan James. 1-yard TD run, Sappington kick, 10:05 (UO 28–10)
- PSU – Omari Evans, 22-yard TD pass from Allar, Barker kick, 6:49 (UO 28–17)
- PSU – Allar, 7-yard TD run, Barker kick, 1:53 (UO 28–24)
- UO – Sappington, 32-yard field goal, 0:07 (UO 31–24)

Third quarter

- UO – Tez Johnson, 48-yard TD pass from Gabriel, Sappington kick, 7:36 (UO 38–24)

Fourth quarter

- PSU – Kaytron Allen, 1-yard TD run, two-point conversion run failed, 14:17 (UO 38–30)
- UO – James, 3-yard TD run, Sappington kick, 7:28 (UO 45–30)
- PSU – Harrison Wallace III, 14-yard TD pass from Allar, Barker kick, 3:41 (UO 45–37)

Statistics	PSU	ORE
First downs	28	24
Total yards	74–518	75–466
Rushing yards	35–292	43–183
Passing yards	226	283
Passing: comp–att–int	20–39–2	22–32–0
Time of possession	27:24	32:36

Team	Category	Player	Statistics
Penn State	Passing	Drew Allar	20/39, 226 yards, 3 TD, 2 INT
Penn State	Rushing	Kaytron Allen	14 carries, 124 yards, TD
Penn State	Receiving	Tyler Warren	7 receptions, 84 yards
Oregon	Passing	Dillon Gabriel	22/32, 283 yards, 4 TD
Oregon	Rushing	Jordan James	20 carries, 87 yards, 2 TD
Oregon	Receiving	Tez Johnson	11 receptions, 181 yards, TD

=== vs No. 10 SMU (CFP First round) ===
College Football Playoff First Round
No. 10 SMU Mustangs (11–2) vs No. 4 Penn State Nittany Lions (11–2)

Quarter	1	2	3	4	Total
No. 10 Mustangs	0	0	3	7	10
No. 4 Nittany Lions	7	21	3	7	38

at Beaver Stadium • State College, Pennsylvania

- Date: December 21
- Game time: 12:00 p.m. EST
- Game weather: 25 °F (−4 °C), mostly sunny
- Game attendance: 106,013
- Referee: David Smith
- TV announcers (TNT/Max/ESPN Radio): Mark Jones (play-by-play), Roddy Jones (color commentator), Quint Kessenich, and Tom Luginbill (sideline reporters)/Bob Wischusen (play-by-play), Louis Riddick (color commentator), and Dawn Davenport (sideline reporter)
- ESPN box score, GoPSUSports.com box score

Game information

First quarter

- PSU – Dominic DeLuca, 23-yard interception return for TD, Ryan Barker kick, 6:08 (PSU 7–0)

Second quarter

- PSU – Tony Rojas, 59-yard interception return for TD, Barker kick, 13:09 (PSU 14–0)
- PSU – Kaytron Allen, 25-yard TD run, Barker kick, 5:00 (PSU 21–0)
- PSU – Nicholas Singleton, 1-yard TD run. Barker kick, 1:03 (PSU 28–0)

Third quarter

- SMU – Collin Rogers, 28-yard field goal, 10:59 (PSU 28–3)
- PSU – Barker, 40-yard field goal, 8:13 (PSU 31–3)

Fourth quarter

- PSU – Allen, 4-yard TD run, Barker kick, 12:56 (PSU 38–3)
- SMU – Roderick Daniels Jr., 28-yard TD pass from Kevin Jennings, Rogers kick, 7:31 (PSU 38–10)

Statistics	SMU	PSU
First downs	21	18
Total yards	73–253	65–325
Rushing yards	36–58	40–189
Passing yards	195	136
Passing: comp–att–int	20–37–3	14–25–1
Time of possession	28:48	31:12

Team	Category	Player	Statistics
SMU	Passing	Kevin Jennings	20/36, 195 yards, TD, 3 INT
SMU	Rushing	Brashard Smith	18 carries, 62 yards
SMU	Receiving	Roderick Daniels Jr.	4 receptions, 64 yards, TD
Penn State	Passing	Drew Allar	13/22, 127 yards
Penn State	Rushing	Nicholas Singleton	14 carries, 90 yards, TD
Penn State	Receiving	Harrison Wallace III	4 receptions, 48 yards

=== vs No. 9 Boise State (Fiesta Bowl / CFP Quarterfinal) ===
College Football Playoff Quarterfinal at the 2024 Vrbo Fiesta Bowl
No. 4 Penn State Nittany Lions (12–2) vs No. 9 Boise State Broncos (12–1)

Quarter	1	2	3	4	Total
No. 4 Nittany Lions	14	3	7	7	31
No. 9 Broncos	0	7	7	0	14

at State Farm Stadium • Glendale, Arizona

- Date: December 31
- Game time: 7:30 p.m. EST
- Game weather: indoors, roof closed
- Game attendance: 63,854
- Referee: Steve Marlowe
- TV announcers (ESPN/ESPN Radio): Bob Wischusen (play-by-play), Louis Riddick (color commentator), Kris Budden, and Tom Luginbill (sideline reporters)/Mike Couzens (play-by-play), Max Starks (color commentator), and Lauren Sisler (sideline reporter)
- ESPN box score, GoPSUsports.com box score

Game information

First quarter

- PSU – Tyler Warren, 11-yard TD pass from Drew Allar, Ryan Barker kick, 6:40 (PSU 7–0)
- PSU – Omari Evans, 38-yard TD pass from Allar, Barker kick, 3:35 (PSU 14–0)

Second quarter

- BSU – Tyler Crowe, 8-yard TD run, Jonah Dalmas kick, 8:41 (PSU 14–7)
- PSU – Barker, 40-yard field goal, 0:00 (PSU 17–7)

Third quarter

- BSU – Matt Lauter, 53-yard TD pass from Maddux Madsen, Dalmas kick, 11:38 (PSU 17–14)
- PSU – Warren, 13-yard TD pass from Allar, Barker kick, 7:22 (PSU 24–14)

Fourth quarter

- PSU – Nicholas Singleton, 58-yard TD run, Barker kick, 4:54 (PSU 31–14)

Statistics	PSU	BSU
First downs	21	25
Total yards	66–387	75–412
Rushing yards	41–216	40–108
Passing yards	171	304
Passing: comp–att–int	13–25–0	23–35–3
Time of possession	25:56	34:04

Team	Category	Player	Statistics
Penn State	Passing	Drew Allar	13/25, 171 yards, 3 TD
Penn State	Rushing	Kaytron Allen	17 carries, 134 yards
Penn State	Receiving	Tyler Warren	6 receptions, 63 yards, 2 TD
Boise State	Passing	Maddux Madsen	23/35, 304 yards, TD, 3 INT
Boise State	Rushing	Ashton Jeanty	30 carries, 104 yards
Boise State	Receiving	Matt Lauter	4 receptions, 96 yards, TD

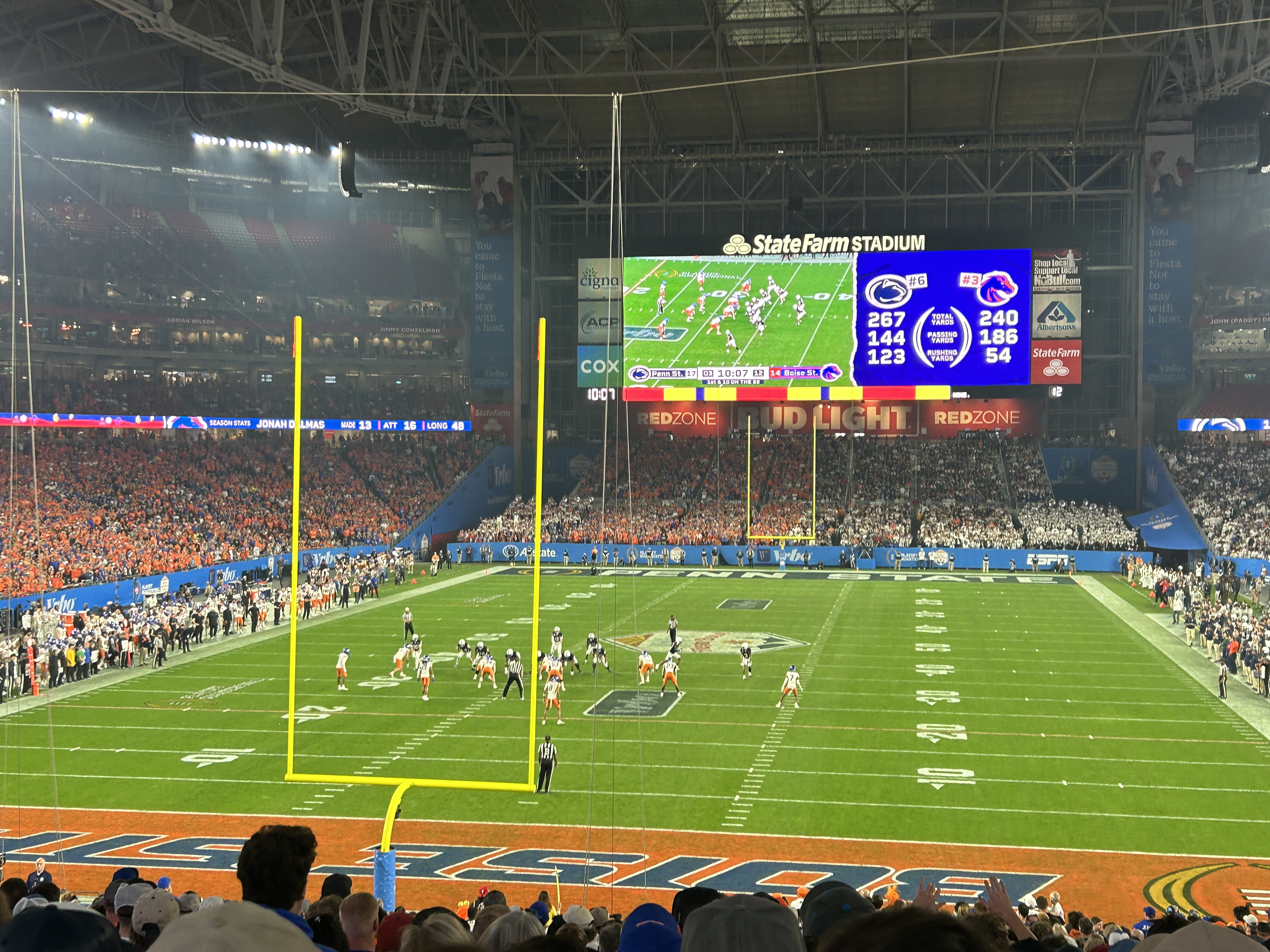
Fiesta Bowl against Boise State

=== vs No. 5 Notre Dame (Orange Bowl / CFP Semifinal) ===
College Football Playoff Semifinal at the 2025 Capital One Orange Bowl
No. 5 Notre Dame (13–1) vs No. 4 Penn State Nittany Lions (13–2)

Quarter	1	2	3	4	Total
No. 5 Fighting Irish	0	3	7	17	27
No. 4 Nittany Lions	0	10	0	14	24

at Hard Rock Stadium • Miami Gardens, Florida

- Date: January 9, 2025
- Game time: 7:30 p.m. EST
- Game weather: 58 °F (14 °C), clear
- Game attendance: 66,881
- Referee: Michael Vandervelde
- TV announcers (ESPN): Sean McDonough (play-by-play), Greg McElroy (color commentator), Molly McGrath, and Katie George (sideline reporters)/Dave Pasch (play-by-play), Roddy Jones (color commentator), Kris Budden, and Taylor McGregor (sideline reporters)
- ESPN box score, GoPSUsports.com box score

Game information

First quarter

No scoring

Second quarter

- PSU – Ryan Barker, 20-yard field goal, 14:52 (PSU 3–0)
- PSU – Nicholas Singleton, 5-yard TD run, Barker kick, 2:18 (PSU 10–0)
- ND – Mitch Jeter, 41-yard field goal, 0:00 (PSU 10-3)

Third quarter

- ND – Riley Leonard, 3-yard TD run, Jeter kick, 10:46 (TIE 10–10)

Fourth quarter

- ND – Jeremiyah Love, 2-yard TD run, Jeter kick, 14:07 (UND 17–10)
- PSU – Singleton, 7-yard TD run, Barker kick, 10:20 (TIE 17–17)
- PSU – Singleton, 7-yard TD run, Barker kick, 7:55 (PSU 24–17)
- ND – Jaden Greathouse, 54-yard TD pass from Leonard, Jeter kick, 4:38 (TIE 24–24)
- ND – Jeter, 41-yard field goal, 0:08 (UND 27–24)

Statistics	ND	PSU
First downs	23	20
Total yards	73–383	75–339
Rushing yards	42–116	42–204
Passing yards	267	135
Passing: comp–att–int	21–31–2	12–23–1
Time of possession	29:56	30:04

Team	Category	Player	Statistics
Notre Dame	Passing	Riley Leonard	15/23, 223 yards, TD, 2 INT
Notre Dame	Rushing	Jeremiyah Love	11 carries, 45 yards, TD
Notre Dame	Receiving	Jaden Greathouse	7 receptions, 105 yards, TD
Penn State	Passing	Drew Allar	12/23, 135 yards, INT
Penn State	Rushing	Nicholas Singleton	15 carries, 84 yards, 3 TD
Penn State	Receiving	Tyler Warren	6 receptions, 75 yards

== Roster ==
2024 Penn State Nittany Lions football team roster
Players
Coaches
Offense

Pos.	#	Name	Class
WR	2	Liam Clifford	Jr
WR	3	Julian Fleming	Sr
WR	4	Tyseer Denmark	Fr
WR	5	Omari Evans	Jr
WR	6	Harrison Wallace III	Jr
WR	7	Kaden Saunders	So
QB	9	Beau Pribula	So
RB	10	Nicholas Singleton	Jr
WR	11	Tyler Johnson	So
WR	12	Anthony Ivey	So
RB	13	Kaytron Allen	Jr
QB	14	Jaxon Smolik	Fr
QB	15	Drew Allar (C)	Jr
TE	16	Khalil Dinkins	Jr
QB	17	Ethan Grunkemeyer	Fr
TE	18	Joey Schlaffer	Fr
WR	19	Josiah Brown	Fr
QB	19	Jack Lambert	Fr
RB	24	Corey Smith	Fr
RB	25	Quinton Martin Jr.	Fr
RB	26	Cam Wallace	Fr
RB	30	Amiel Davis	Jr
WR	31	Logan Cunningham	So
RB	34	Tyler Holzworth	Jr
TE	44	Tyler Warren	Sr
OL	50	Cooper Cousins	Fr
OL	52	Dominic Rulli	So
OL	53	Nick Dawkins (C)	Sr
OL	54	Ian Harvie	So
OL	55	Chimdy Onoh	Fr
OL	56	JB Nelson	Sr
OL	57	Donnie Harbour	Fr
OL	60	Logan Bahn	Fr
OL	61	Liam Horan	Fr
OL	63	Alex Birchmeier	Fr
OL	64	Eagan Boyer	Fr
OL	65	Jim Fitzgerald	So
OL	66	Drew Shelton	Jr
OL	67	Henry Boehme	Fr
OL	68	Anthony Donkoh	Fr
OL	70	Garrett Sexton	Fr
OL	71	Olaivavega Ioane	So
OL	72	Nolan Rucci	Jr
OL	73	Caleb Brewer	Fr
OL	74	J'ven Williams	Fr
OL	75	Matt Detisch	So
OL	76	Mason Carlan	Sr
OL	77	Sal Wormley	GS
OL	79	Addison Penn	Sr
WR	80	Mehki Flowers	So
WR	81	Donte Nastasi	Fr
WR	82	Ethan Black	Fr
WR	83	Jake Spencer	Sr
WR	84	Peter Gonzalez	Fr
TE	85	Luke Reynolds	Fr
WR	86	Jason Estrella	Jr
WR	86	Aaron Enterline	Fr
TE	87	Andrew Rappleyea	Fr
TE	88	Jerry Cross	So
TE	89	Finn Furmanek	Fr

Defense

Pos.	#	Name	Class
LB	0	Dominic DeLuca (C)	Jr
S	1	Jaylen Reed	Sr
S	2	Kevin Winston Jr. (C)	Jr
CB	3	Jalen Kimber	Sr
CB	4	A. J. Harris	So
CB	5	Cam Miller	Jr
S	6	Zakee Wheatley	Jr
CB	7	Zion Tracy	So
S	8	DaKaari Nelson	Fr
CB	9	Elliot Washington II	So
S	10	Dejuan Lane	Fr
DE	11	Abdul Carter	Jr
CB	12	Jon Mitchell	Fr
LB	13	Tony Rojas	So
S	14	Tyrece Mills	Sr
DE	15	Amin Vanover	Sr
CB	17	Kenny Woseley Jr.	Fr
DE	18	Max Granville	Fr
DE	20	Mylachi Williams	Fr
S	21	Vaboue Toure	Fr
CB	23	Antoine Belgrave-Shorter	Fr
LB	24	Ta'Mere Robinson	Fr
S	27	Lamont Payne Jr.	Fr
DT	28	Zane Durant	Jr
S	28	Karson Kiesewetter	Fr
CB	29	Audavion Collins	So
LB	30	Kari Jackson	Fr
S	31	Kolin Dinkins	So
LB	32	Keon Wylie	So
DE	33	Dani Dennis-Sutton	Jr
CB	35	Tyler Armstead	Fr
DE	36	Zuriah Fisher	Sr
LB	37	Beckham Dee	Fr
LB	38	Winston Yates	Fr
DT	39	Ty Blanding	Fr
S	39	Jashaun Green	So
LB	40	Anthony Speca	Fr
S	40	Patrick Williams	So
LB	41	Kobe King (C)	Jr
DE	42	Mason Robinson	Fr
LB	43	Tyler Elsdon	Sr
DE	44	Jaylen Harvey	Fr
LB	45	Jackson Pryts	So
DE	47	Aidan Probst	Fr
LB	49	Ben Chizmar	Jr
DT	50	Alonzo Ford Jr.	Sr
DT	54	Xavier Gilliam	Fr
DE	56	Joseph Mupoyi	Fr
DT	58	Kaleb Artis	So
DT	88	Sam Siafa	So
DT	90	Liam Andrews	Fr
DT	91	Dvon J-Thomas	GS
DE	92	Smith Vilbert	GS
DE	93	Bobby Mears	Fr
DT	94	De'Andre Cook	Fr
DE	95	Jordan Mayer	Fr
DT	97	T. A. Cunningham	Fr
DT	99	Coziah Izzard	Sr

Special teams

Pos.	#	Name	Class
LS	35	Blaise Sokach-Minnick	So
LS	47	Will Patton	So
LS	48	Tyler Duzansky	Jr
K	91	Chase Meyer	Jr
LS	92	Andrew Dufault	Fr
K	93	Sander Sahaydak	Jr
K	94	Ryan Barker	Fr
P	95	Riley Thompson (C)	Jr
P	96	Mitchell Groh	Jr
P	99	Gabriel Nwosu	Jr

Head coach

- James Franklin

Coordinators/assistant coaches

- Terry Smith – Associate head coach/defensive recruiting coordinator/cornerbacks
- Ja'Juan Seider – Assistant head coach/co-offensive coordinator/running backs
- Tom Allen – Defensive coordinator/linebackers
- Andy Kotelnicki – Offensive coordinator
- Justin Lustig – Special teams coordinator/outside linebackers/nickels
- Deion Barnes – Defensive line
- Marques Hagans – Offensive recruiting coordinator/wide receivers
- Ty Howle – Co-offensive coordinator/tight ends
- Anthony Poindexter – Co-defensive coordinator/safeties
- Phil Trautwein – Offensive line
- Chuck Losey – Assistant AD/performance enhancement
- Torrence Brown – Defensive graduate assistant
- Kevin Ceh – Offensive graduate assistant
- Jordan Lucas – Defensive graduate assistant
- Danny O'Brien – Quarterbacks

Legend

- (C) Team captain
- (S) Suspended
- (I) Ineligible
- Injured
- Redshirt

Roster
Last update: August 14, 2024
