= 2024–25 College Football Playoff =

Postseason college football tournament

- Season: 2024
- Dates: December 20, 2024 – January 20, 2025
- Teams invited: (1) Oregon; (2) Georgia; (3) Boise State; (4) Arizona State; (5) Texas; (6) Penn State; (7) Notre Dame; (8) Ohio State; (9) Tennessee; (10) Indiana; (11) SMU; (12) Clemson
- Venues: Campus sites: Beaver Stadium; Darrell K Royal–Texas Memorial Stadium; Notre Dame Stadium; Ohio Stadium; Neutral sites: AT&T Stadium; Caesars Superdome; Hard Rock Stadium; Mercedes-Benz Stadium; Rose Bowl; State Farm Stadium
- Champions: Ohio State (2nd CFP title, 9th overall title)

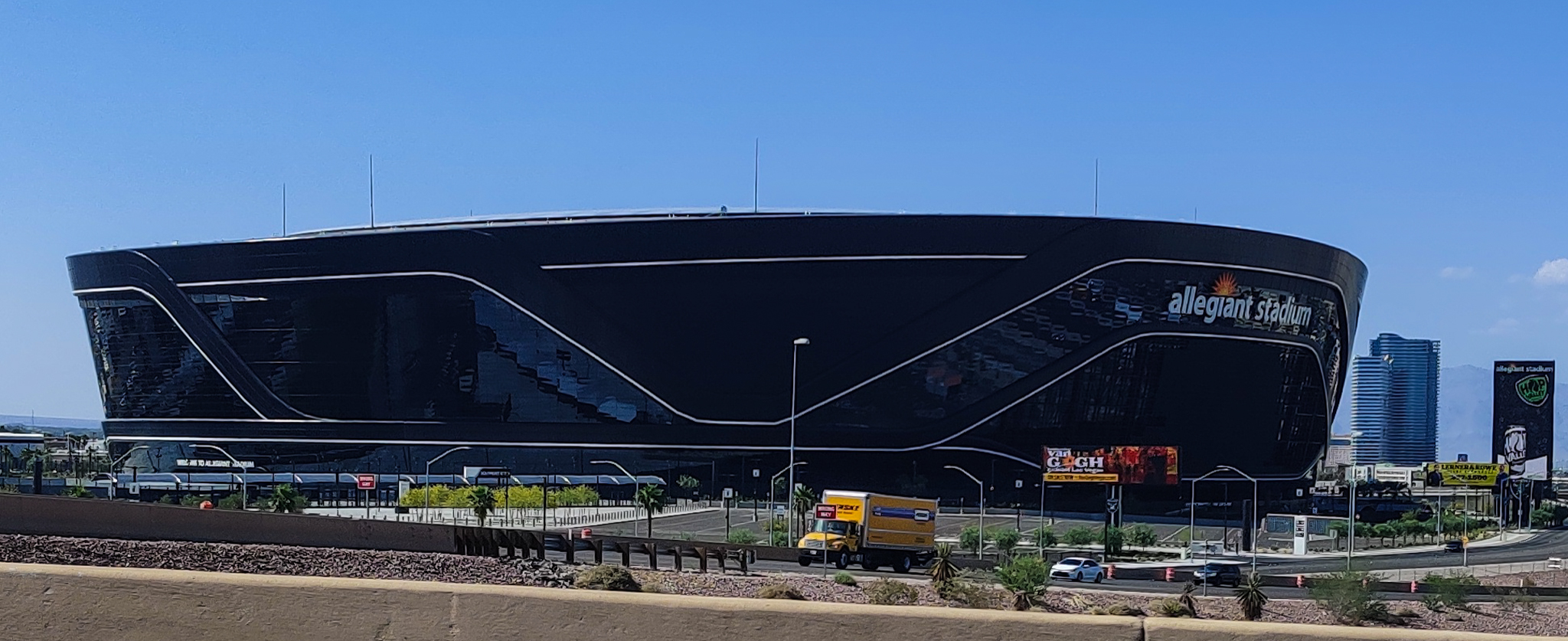
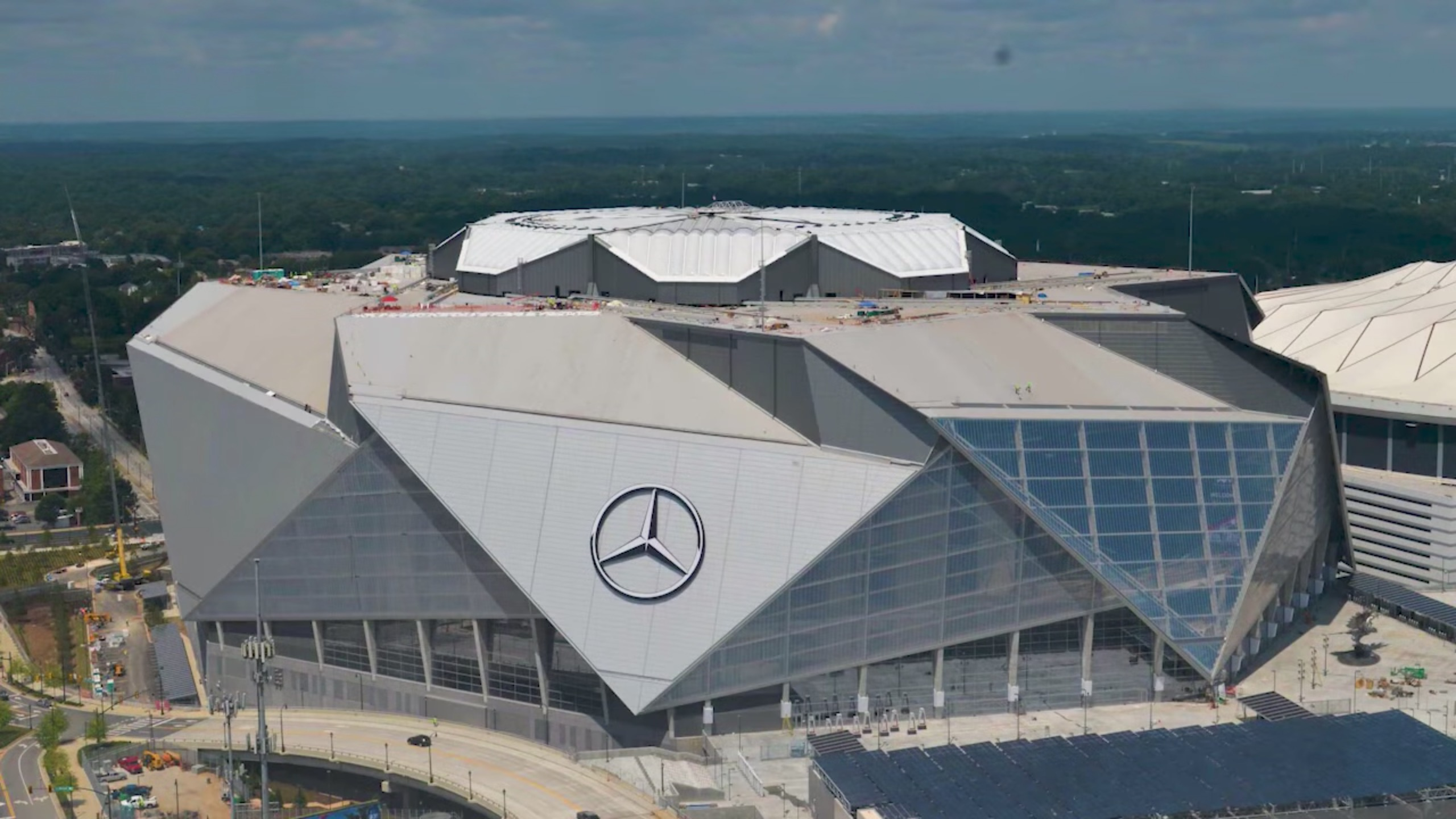
The College Football Playoff National Championship was originally scheduled to be played at Allegiant Stadium in Paradise, Nevada, but was moved to Mercedes-Benz Stadium in Atlanta, Georgia, due to a conflict with the Consumer Electronics Show (CES). Allegiant Stadium will instead host in 2027.

The 2024–25 College Football Playoff was a single-elimination postseason tournament that determined the national champion of the 2024 NCAA Division I FBS football season. It was the 11th edition of the College Football Playoff (CFP).

Following the first 10 iterations of the College Football Playoff comprising four teams, the 2024–25 playoff was the first to include 12 teams as ranked by the College Football Playoff poll. The five highest-ranked conference champions, including at least one from the Group of Five conferences, were selected to compete, along with the next seven highest-ranked teams. Furthermore, this was the only iteration of the 12-team playoff where the four highest-ranked conference champions each received a first-round bye in the playoff, as the format was changed to have the four highest-ranked teams overall receive a first-round bye for the 2025 season.

The playoff bracket's first-round games were held on December 20 and 21 at respective campus sites; the higher ranked team was victorious in all four games. In the quarterfinals, played on December 31, January 1, and January 2 at the Fiesta Bowl, Peach Bowl, Rose Bowl, and Sugar Bowl, the top four seeds played the teams that won their first-round games. All four top seeds lost in the quarterfinals, with all the first round winners having won both of their first two CFP games to advance to the semifinals, held at the Orange Bowl and the Cotton Bowl Classic, played on January 9 and 10, respectively. Like the quarterfinals, all higher seeds were defeated, with 7th seed Notre Dame and 8th seed Ohio State advancing to play in the College Football Playoff National Championship on January 20 at Mercedes-Benz Stadium in Atlanta, Georgia. In the championship game, Ohio State beat Notre Dame 34–23 to win their second CFP national championship and their ninth in school history.

== Games ==
Locations of the playoff games: campus site first round games (red), quarterfinals (orange), semifinals (yellow), and the national championship (green)

The tournament was structured as a single-elimination bracket tournament, with 12 teams playing a total of 11 games. The first round featured the fifth-highest-ranked conference champion (Clemson) and seven at large bids, seeded based on the final CFP rankings, which were released after conference championship games had been played. The first-round winners advanced to face the four highest-ranked conference champions in the quarterfinals. The quarterfinal and semifinal contests utilized six of the 2024–25 NCAA football bowl games. These bowls, commonly known as the New Year's Six, are some of the oldest (and historically, most prestigious) bowl games.

=== Schedule ===
All times are Eastern Time • Schedule source

Round	Date	Time	Matchup	Game	Location	TV
First round	December 20	8:00 p.m.	Indiana 17, Notre Dame 27	First round (Campus sites)	Notre Dame Stadium • Notre Dame, Indiana	ESPN/ABC
First round	December 21	12:00 p.m.	SMU 10, Penn State 38	First round (Campus sites)	Beaver Stadium • University Park, Pennsylvania	TNT/TBS/TruTV/Max
First round	December 21	4:00 p.m.	Clemson 24, Texas 38	First round (Campus sites)	DKR–Texas Memorial Stadium • Austin, Texas	TNT/TBS/TruTV/Max
First round	December 21	8:00 p.m.	Tennessee 17, Ohio State 42	First round (Campus sites)	Ohio Stadium • Columbus, Ohio	ESPN/ABC
Quarterfinals	December 31	7:30 p.m.	Penn State 31, Boise State 14	Fiesta Bowl	State Farm Stadium • Glendale, Arizona	ESPN
Quarterfinals	January 1	1:00 p.m.	Texas 39, Arizona State 31 (2OT)	Peach Bowl	Mercedes-Benz Stadium • Atlanta, Georgia	ESPN
Quarterfinals	January 1	5:00 p.m.	Ohio State 41, Oregon 21	Rose Bowl	Rose Bowl • Pasadena, California	ESPN
Quarterfinals	January 2	4:00 p.m.	Notre Dame 23, Georgia 10	Sugar Bowl	Caesars Superdome • New Orleans, Louisiana	ESPN
Semifinals	January 9	7:30 p.m.	Notre Dame 27, Penn State 24	Orange Bowl	Hard Rock Stadium • Miami Gardens, Florida	ESPN
Semifinals	January 10	7:30 p.m.	Ohio State 28, Texas 14	Cotton Bowl Classic	AT&T Stadium • Arlington, Texas	ESPN
Championship	January 20	7:30 p.m.	Ohio State 34, Notre Dame 23	National Championship	Mercedes-Benz Stadium • Atlanta, Georgia	ESPN

=== Bracket ===
First round
Dec 21 – Ohio Stadium
8	Ohio State	42
9	Tennessee	17
Dec 21 – DKR–Texas Memorial Stadium
5	Texas	38
12	Clemson	24
Dec 20 – Notre Dame Stadium
7	Notre Dame	27
10	Indiana	17
Dec 21 – Beaver Stadium
6	Penn State	38
11	SMU	10

Quarterfinals
Jan 1 – Rose Bowl, Rose Bowl
1	Oregon	21
8	Ohio State	41
Jan 1 – Peach Bowl, Mercedes-Benz Stadium
4	Arizona State	31
5	Texas (2OT)	39
Jan 2 – Sugar Bowl, Caesars Superdome
2	Georgia	10
7	Notre Dame	23
Dec 31 – Fiesta Bowl, State Farm Stadium
3	Boise State	14
6	Penn State	31

Semifinals
Jan 10 – Cotton Bowl Classic, AT&T Stadium
8	Ohio State	28
5	Texas	14
Jan 9 – Orange Bowl, Hard Rock Stadium
7	Notre Dame	27
6	Penn State	24

Championship
Jan 20 – Mercedes-Benz Stadium
8	Ohio State	34
7	Notre Dame	23

== Selection and teams ==
Playoff participants (teams in bold received byes to the quarterfinals)
Big Ten, SEC, ACC, Big 12, Mountain West, Independent

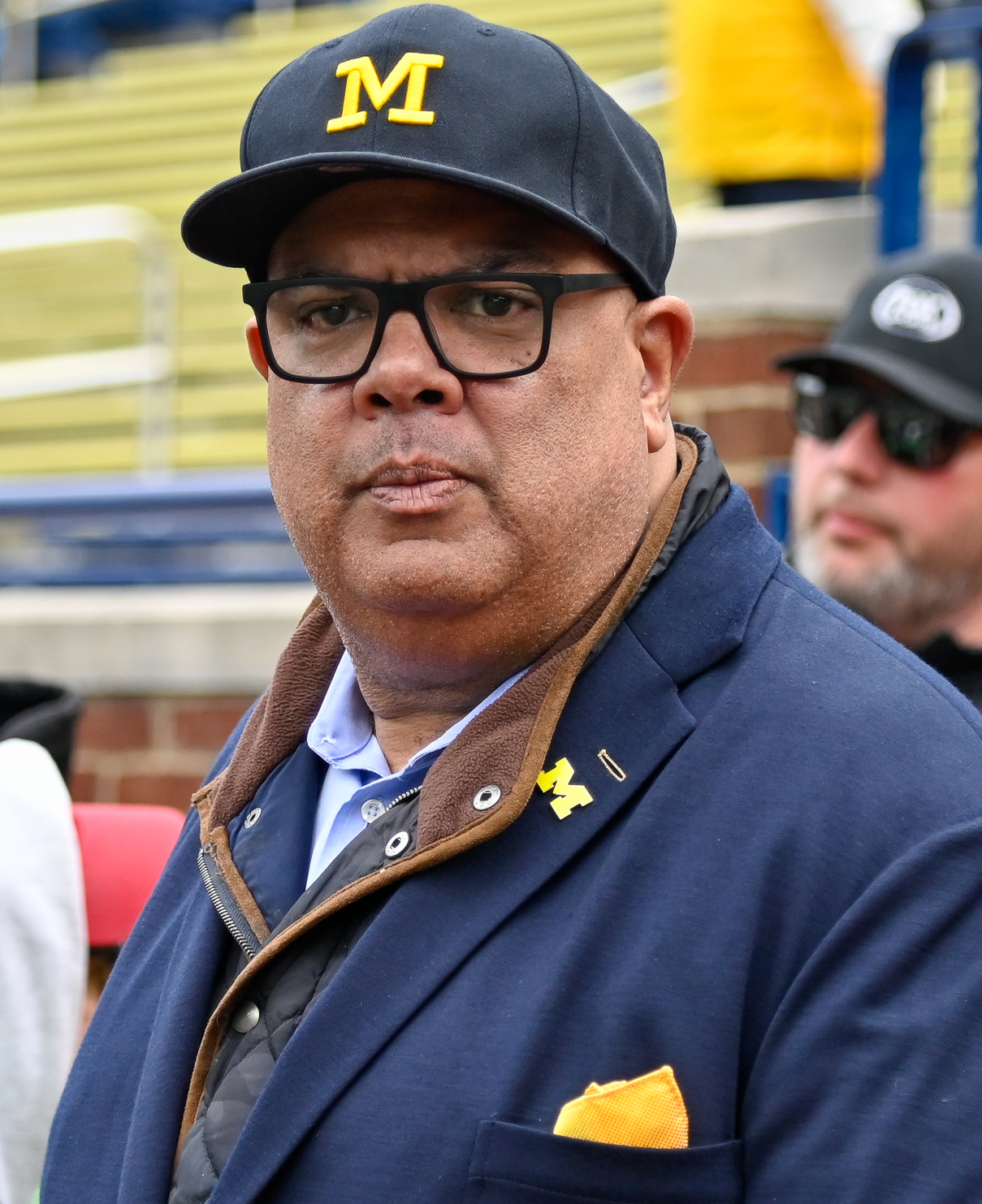
Warde Manuel, chair of the College Football Playoff selection committee

The 2024–25 CFP selection committee was chaired by Michigan athletic director Warde Manuel. Its other members were former Nevada head coach and athletic director Chris Ault, Navy athletic director Chet Gladchuk Jr., former head coach Jim Grobe, former NFL player Randall McDaniel, former head coach Gary Pinkel, Baylor athletic director Mack Rhoades, former head coach Mike Riley, Miami (OH) athletic director David Sayler, former NFL player Will Shields, former USA Today reporter Kelly Whiteside, Virginia athletic director Carla Williams, and Arkansas athletic director Hunter Yurachek.

The first CFP rankings of the season were released on November 5. Oregon was the first No. 1-ranked team of the season, and was projected to earn a first-round bye as leaders of the Big Ten Conference. The other three highest-ranked conference leaders, each in line to earn first round byes, were No. 3 Georgia from the Southeastern Conference (SEC), No. 4 Miami (FL) from the Atlantic Coast Conference (ACC), and No. 9 BYU from the Big 12 Conference. No. 12 Boise State from the Mountain West Conference (MWC) was the highest-ranked Group of Five leader, and the rest of the projected field was filled in by No. 2 Ohio State (Big Ten), No. 5 Texas (SEC), No. 6 Penn State (Big Ten), No. 7 Tennessee (SEC), No. 8 Indiana (Big Ten), No. 10 Notre Dame (FBS independent), and No. 11 Alabama (SEC).

During the week following the first rankings release, two top ten teams were defeated, with No. 16 Ole Miss beating Georgia and Georgia Tech upsetting Miami to deal them their first loss of the season. As a result, Miami dropped to No. 9 and Georgia to No. 12. This dropped Georgia out of the projected playoff field, as No. 13 Boise State stood to be selected as the 12-seed by virtue of their position as the highest-ranked Group of Five champion. Texas, Penn State, Indiana, and BYU each moved up to fill out the remainder of the top six behind Oregon and Ohio State, with Texas also becoming the SEC leader in line to earn a first-round bye. Ole Miss also moved into playoff position.

Following the second rankings' release, Georgia's rivalry game victory over Tennessee and Kansas' upset of BYU moved the Bulldogs back into playoff position at the Volunteers' expense while Boise State moved ahead of BYU into position for a first-round bye. After the third rankings' release, Oklahoma's upset of Alabama and Florida's upset of Ole Miss respectively knocked the Crimson Tide and the Rebels out of playoff position. Tennessee moved back into the top 12, while SMU cracked the top 12 for the first time after clinching an ACC Championship Game berth in their first year in the conference. Ohio State's win over Indiana to deal them their first loss of the season also dropped the Hoosiers to 10th, while Arizona State's win over BYU also put them into playoff position as the Big 12 leader. Following the fourth rankings' release, Ohio State's upset loss to archrival Michigan knocked them down to 6th, while Miami's upset loss to Syracuse knocked them out of playoff position, with Alabama re-entering the top 12.

During the conference championships, Georgia beat Texas in overtime in the SEC Championship to secure a berth. Meanwhile, Clemson beat SMU on a last-second field goal to win the ACC Championship and secure a berth, which also gave Boise State and Arizona State first-round byes after they won the Mountain West and Big 12 championships, respectively. SMU's loss to Clemson sparked debate over whether the Mustangs or the Crimson Tide deserved a playoff berth. Alabama had a higher strength of schedule than SMU but had lost to multiple unranked teams – in addition to their loss to Oklahoma, the Crimson Tide had lost to Vanderbilt. The committee ultimately ranked SMU higher than Alabama, giving SMU the final at-large berth in the playoff bracket and sending the Crimson Tide to face Michigan in the ReliaQuest Bowl, a rematch of the 2024 Rose Bowl CFP semifinal.

2024 College Football Playoff rankings top sixteen progression
No.	Week 9 November 5	Week 10 November 12	Week 11 November 19	Week 12 November 26	Week 13 December 3	Final December 8
1	**Oregon** (9–0)	**Oregon** (10–0)	**Oregon** (11–0)	**Oregon** (11–0)	**Oregon** (12–0)	**Oregon** (13–0)
2	Ohio State (7–1)	Ohio State (8–1)	Ohio State (9–1)	Ohio State (10–1)	**Texas** (11–1)	**Georgia** (11–2)
3	**Georgia** (7–1)	**Texas** (8–1)	**Texas** (9–1)	**Texas** (10–1)	Penn State (11–1)	Texas (11–2)
4	**Miami (FL)** (9–0)	Penn State (8–1)	Penn State (9–1)	Penn State (10–1)	Notre Dame (11–1)	Penn State (11–2)
5	Texas (7–1)	Indiana (10–0)	Indiana (10–0)	Notre Dame (10–1)	Georgia (10–2)	Notre Dame (11–1)
6	Penn State (7–1)	**BYU** (9–0)	Notre Dame (9–1)	**Miami (FL)** (10–1)	Ohio State (10–2)	Ohio State (10–2)
7	Tennessee (7–1)	Tennessee (8–1)	Alabama (8–2)	Georgia (9–2)	Tennessee (10–2)	Tennessee (10–2)
8	Indiana (9–0)	Notre Dame (8–1)	**Miami (FL)** (9–1)	Tennessee (9–2)	**SMU** (11–1)	Indiana (11–1)
9	**BYU** (8–0)	**Miami (FL)** (9–1)	Ole Miss (8–2)	SMU (10–1)	Indiana (11–1)	**Boise State** (12–1)
10	Notre Dame (7–1)	Alabama (7–2)	Georgia (8–2)	Indiana (10–1)	**Boise State** (11–1)	SMU (11–2)
11	Alabama (6–2)	Ole Miss (8–2)	Tennessee (8–2)	**Boise State** (10–1)	Alabama (9–3)	Alabama (9–3)
12	**Boise State** (7–1)	Georgia (7–2)	**Boise State** (9–1)	Clemson (9–2)	Miami (FL) (10–2)	**Arizona State** (11–2)
13	SMU (8–1)	**Boise State** (8–1)	SMU (9–1)	Alabama (8–3)	Ole Miss (9–3)	Miami (FL) (10–2)
14	Texas A&M (7–2)	SMU (8–1)	**BYU** (9–1)	Ole Miss (8–3)	South Carolina (9–3)	Ole Miss (9–3)
15	LSU (6–2)	Texas A&M (7–2)	Texas A&M (8–2)	South Carolina (8–3)	**Arizona State** (10–2)	South Carolina (9–3)
16	Ole Miss (7–2)	Kansas State (7–2)	Colorado (8–2)	**Arizona State** (9–2)	Iowa State (10–2)	**Clemson** (10–3)

Key
Teams in **boldface** are leading their conference at time of rankings release (or conference winners in the case of the final rankings).
- The five highest-ranked conference champions, including at least one from the Group of Five conferences, will be selected.
- The four highest-ranked conference champions will receive first-round byes.
The cutoff line represents the threshold of the top 12 teams as ranked by the CFP poll.
- A team ranked lower than 12 may still qualify, if it is one of the five highest-ranked conference champions.
- If that occurs, then that will displace the lowest ranked team in the top 12 that is not a conference champion.
Denotes teams who rose in the rankings compared to the previous week.
Denotes teams who fell in the rankings compared to the previous week.
Denotes teams whose rankings or conference championship victory resulted in a berth for the College Football Playoff.

=== Participants ===
Team	Conference	Record	Qualification method	College Football Playoff		
Team	Conference	Record	Qualification method	Appearance	Last bid	Result of last appearance
Arizona State	Big 12 Conference	11–2 (7–2)	Conference champion	First appearance		
Boise State	Mountain West Conference	12–1 (7–0)	Conference champion	First appearance		
Clemson	Atlantic Coast Conference	10–3 (7–1)	Conference champion	7th	2020	Lost to Ohio State in the semifinals
Georgia	Southeastern Conference	11–2 (6–2)	Conference champion	4th	2022	**Defeated TCU in National Championship**
Indiana	Big Ten Conference	11–1 (8–1)	At-large	First appearance		
Notre Dame	Independent	11–1	At-large	3rd	2020	Lost to Alabama in the semifinals
Ohio State	Big Ten Conference	10–2 (7–2)	At-large	6th	2022	Lost to Georgia in the semifinals
Oregon	Big Ten Conference	13–0 (9–0)	Conference champion	2nd	2014	Lost to Ohio State in the National Championship
Penn State	Big Ten Conference	11–2 (8–1)	At-large	First appearance		
SMU	Atlantic Coast Conference	11–2 (8–0)	At-large	First appearance		
Tennessee	Southeastern Conference	10–2 (6–2)	At-large	First appearance		
Texas	Southeastern Conference	11–2 (7–1)	At-large	2nd	2023	Lost to Washington in the semifinals

== Game summaries ==
=== First round ===
==== Indiana at Notre Dame ====
CFP First Round: Indiana at Notre Dame

Quarter	1	2	3	4	Total
(10) No. 8 Indiana	0	3	0	14	17
(7) No. 5 Notre Dame	7	10	3	7	27

at Notre Dame Stadium • Notre Dame, Indiana

- Date: December 20, 2024
- Game time: 8:10 p.m. EST
- Game weather: Cloudy • 27 °F (−3 °C)
- Game attendance: 77,622
- Referee: David Alvarez (Big 12)
- TV announcers (ESPN/ABC): Sean McDonough, Greg McElroy, Molly McGrath and Katie George
- ESPN box score / Official game book

The 12-team CFP began with the first-round game between No. 8 Indiana, the 10-seed, and No. 5 Notre Dame, the 7-seed. It was the 30th all-time meeting between the teams and the first since a Notre Dame win in 1991. The game marked Indiana's CFP debut and Notre Dame's third CFP appearance. Notre Dame's longstanding media rights deal with NBC meant this was the first Fighting Irish home game since 1990 not to air on NBC.

Indiana began the game with the ball and punted on their first drive, and afterward both teams traded interceptions. On the first play of Notre Dame's second drive, running back Jeremiyah Love rushed for a 98-yard touchdown, the game's first score. The Fighting Irish doubled their lead on their next drive following a 5-yard touchdown pass from Riley Leonard to Jayden Thomas, and each team scored a field goal late in the second quarter, leading to a halftime score of 17–3.

Both teams punted on their first drive of the second half, and Notre Dame scored the quarter's only points on a 33-yard field goal by Mitch Jeter with under four and a half minutes to play. Notre Dame attempted another field goal on their next drive, but it was blocked by James Carpenter. After an Indiana punt, their third in three drives, Notre Dame drove 78 yards in nine plays and finished with a 1-yard Leonard touchdown rush to push their lead to 24 points. Indiana responded on their following drive with a 7-yard touchdown pass from Kurtis Rourke to Myles Price; the two-point conversion attempt was successful, as was Hoosiers' ensuing onside kick attempt. Indiana scored again with 25 seconds remaining on a pass from Rourke to Omar Cooper Jr., though this two-point try was unsuccessful. Notre Dame then retook possession following a failed onside kick and ran out the clock for a 27–17 victory.

==== SMU at Penn State ====
CFP First Round: SMU at Penn State

Quarter	1	2	3	4	Total
(11) No. 10 SMU	0	0	3	7	10
(6) No. 4 Penn State	7	21	3	7	38

at Beaver Stadium • University Park, Pennsylvania

- Date: December 21, 2024
- Game time: 12:10 p.m. EST
- Game weather: Sunny • 25 °F (−4 °C)
- Game attendance: 106,013
- Referee: David Smith (SEC)
- TV announcers (TNT/Max): Mark Jones, Roddy Jones, Quint Kessenich and Tom Luginbill
- ESPN box score / Official game book

No. 10 SMU, the 11-seed, and No. 4 Penn State, the 6-seed, made their respective CFP debuts in their first-round game, which was their third meeting. Their prior meetings were a 1978 Penn State win and a tie in the 1948 Cotton Bowl Classic.

Penn State, who began the game with the ball, punted on both of their first two drives but took the lead when Dominic DeLuca intercepted a Kevin Jennings pass and returned it for a touchdown. Later in the first quarter, Penn State turned the ball over on downs but regained possession early in the second quarter with another interception returned for a touchdown, this time by Tony Rojas. After an SMU punt and another Penn State turnover on downs, Jennings threw a third interception—the second to DeLuca—which led to a 25-yard touchdown rush by Kaytron Allen. Another SMU turnover on downs followed, and Penn State scored the final points of the first half on a Nicholas Singleton rush, giving the hosts a 28–0 halftime lead.

SMU opened the second half by scoring their first points of the contest on a 28-yard field goal by Collin Rogers, and Penn State answered with a Ryan Barker field goal on their first drive of the half. A Rogers miss from 42 yards on SMU's ensuing drive gave Penn State the ball back, and the Nittany Lions drove 75 yards in nine plays to push their lead to 35 points on a 4-yard rush by Allen. SMU punted on their next drive but quickly regained possession following a Brandon Crossley interception, leading to SMU's only touchdown on a 28-yard pass from Jennings to Roderick Daniels Jr. A punt by each team gave the ball back to Penn State, who ran out the clock to conclude the game and advanced to the quarterfinals with a 38–10 win.

==== Clemson at Texas ====
CFP First Round: Clemson at Texas

Quarter	1	2	3	4	Total
(12) No. 16 Clemson	7	3	7	7	24
(5) No. 3 Texas	7	21	3	7	38

at Darrell K Royal–Texas Memorial Stadium • Austin, Texas

- Date: December 21, 2024
- Game time: 3:11 p.m. CST
- Game weather: Sunny • 60 °F (16 °C)
- Game attendance: 101,150
- Referee: Ron Snodgrass (Big Ten)
- TV announcers (TNT/Max): Dave Pasch, Dusty Dvoracek, Taylor McGregor and Laura Rutledge
- ESPN box score / Official game book

No. 16 ACC champion Clemson, seeded twelfth, and No. 3 Texas, seeded fifth, faced each other for the first time in the first round of the CFP. The game marked Texas's second CFP appearance and Clemson's seventh.

Both teams scored on their first possessions of the game, Clemson on a 22-yard pass from Cade Klubnik to Antonio Williams and Texas on a 3-yard Quintrevion Wisner rush. Both touchdown drives spanned 75 yards in 12 plays. Texas took their first lead on a 38-yard rush by Jaydon Blue that followed a Clemson three-and-out, and the Longhorns doubled their lead on a 16-yard rush by Wisner after another Clemson punt with seven and a half minutes remaining in the second quarter. Clemson's ensuing drive was cut short when Colin Simmons intercepted Klubnik's pass at the Clemson 26-yard line. A 32-yard field goal by Clemson's Nolan Hauser was the next scoring play of the game, following a punt by Clemson and an interception of Quinn Ewers by R.J. Mickens. Texas pushed their lead to 18 points with 28 seconds remaining in the half with a 19-yard passing touchdown from Ewers to Gunnar Helm, making the halftime score 28–10.

Texas finished their first drive of the second half with a 22-yard Bert Auburn field goal, extending their lead to 21 points. Both teams traded punts before Clemson scored on a 25-yard pass from Klubnik to Jarvis Green. Texas drove to the Clemson 36-yard line on their next possession but their fourth down pass fell incomplete, resulting in another turnover on downs. Clemson capitalized with a 10-play drive culminating in a 7-yard pass from Klubnik to T. J. Moore, and Texas scored a touchdown of their own two plays later on a 77-yard rush by Blue. Clemson reached the Texas 10-yard line in five plays on their ensuing drive but failed to score after turning the ball over on downs at the 1-yard line. Texas fumbled to end their next drive, but Clemson was only able to reach the Texas 26-yard line before another turnover on downs, and the game ended with a 38–24 Texas victory.

==== Tennessee at Ohio State ====
CFP First Round: Tennessee at Ohio State

Quarter	1	2	3	4	Total
(9) No. 7 Tennessee	0	10	0	7	17
(8) No. 6 Ohio State	21	0	14	7	42

at Ohio Stadium • Columbus, Ohio

- Date: December 21, 2024
- Game time: 8:10 p.m. EST
- Game weather: Clear • 25 °F (−4 °C)
- Game attendance: 102,819
- Referee: Jerry Magallanes (ACC)
- TV announcers (ESPN/ABC): Chris Fowler, Kirk Herbstreit, Holly Rowe and Marty Smith
- ESPN box score / Official game book

The CFP first round concluded with a game between No. 7 Tennessee, seeded ninth, and No. 6 Ohio State, seeded eighth. Their only prior meeting was in the 1996 Citrus Bowl, which Tennessee won 20–14. The Buckeyes made their sixth CFP appearance, while the Volunteers made their CFP debut.

The Buckeyes received the ball first and scored on their fifth offensive snap on a 37-yard pass from Will Howard to Jeremiah Smith. After forcing a three-and-out by Tennessee, they pushed their lead to 14 points on a 1-yard Quinshon Judkins rush and shortly afterwards to 21 points on a 29-yard TreVeyon Henderson rush following another Tennessee punt on their third drive. An interception by Tennessee's Will Brooks led to the Volunteers' first score, a 36-yard Max Gilbert field goal, with six and a half minutes remaining in the second quarter. Ohio State punted for the first time on their next drive, and Tennessee narrowed the deficit to eleven points after capping a 16-play drive with a 2-yard Nico Iamaleava touchdown rush. Ohio State advanced the ball to the Tennessee 38-yard line before an unsuccessful 56-yard field goal attempt by Jayden Fielding ended the half.

Ohio State ended Tennessee's run of ten unanswered points with a touchdown on their first drive of the third quarter. After Tennessee opened the half with a punt, the Buckeyes took possession at their own 35-yard line and scored on a 22-yard Howard-to-Smith pass on their sixth play. The Buckeyes scored again on their second and third drives of the half, on runs of 1 and 24 yards by Judkins and Henderson, respectively, while the Volunteers were held to another punt and a turnover on downs. Tennessee scored the game's final points on a 2-yard Iamaleava rush with 1:56 to play. Ohio State was then able to run the clock out to secure a 42–17 victory.

=== Quarterfinals ===
==== Fiesta Bowl ====
2024 Fiesta Bowl

Quarter	1	2	3	4	Total
(6) No. 4 Penn State	14	3	7	7	31
(3) No. 9 Boise State	0	7	7	0	14

at State Farm Stadium • Glendale, Arizona

- Date: December 31, 2024
- Game time: 5:30 p.m. MST
- Game weather: n/a (retractable roof closed)
- Game attendance: 63,854
- Referee: Steve Marlowe (SEC)
- TV announcers (ESPN): Bob Wischusen, Louis Riddick, Kris Budden and Tom Luginbill
- ESPN box score / Official game book

The quarterfinals opened with No. 9 and Mountain West champion Boise State, seeded third and making their CFP debut, facing Penn State for the first time.

Both teams began the game with scoring chances; Boise State's first possession ended with an unsuccessful field goal attempt, and Penn State scored on a pass from Drew Allar to Tyler Warren to complete their first drive. Penn State pushed their lead to 14 points on their second drive with a 38-yard pass from Allar to Omari Evans. Both teams fumbled early into their next possessions and then traded punts early in the second quarter. Boise State scored for the first time on an 8-yard rush by Tyler Crowe, capping an eight-play drive with 8:41 remaining until halftime. After each team punted twice, Penn State's Ryan Barker made a 40-yard field goal as the quarter ended and Penn State entered halftime with a 17–7 lead.

After a three-and-out by Penn State to begin the third quarter, Boise State drew their deficit down to three points with a 53-yard touchdown pass from Maddux Madsen to Matt Lauter. The Nittany Lions reestablished a ten-point lead on their ensuing drive, though, on an Allar-to-Warren touchdown pass. Boise State's next drive concluded with the game's first interception on the first play of the fourth quarter; Madsen's pass was picked off by Zakee Wheatley at the Penn State 41-yard line. After a Penn State punt, Boise State drove to the Penn State 21-yard line but missed a 38-yard field goal. The game's final scoring play came with just under five minutes remaining on a 58-yard Nicholas Singleton rush; both of Boise State's final two drives ended with interceptions and Penn State won 31–14 to advance to the semifinals.

==== Peach Bowl ====
2025 Peach Bowl

Quarter	1	2	3	4	OT	2OT	Total
(5) No. 3 Texas	14	3	0	7	7	8	39
(4) No. 12 Arizona State	3	0	5	16	7	0	31

at Mercedes-Benz Stadium • Atlanta, Georgia

- Date: January 1, 2025
- Game time: 1:00 p.m. EST
- Game weather: n/a (retractable roof closed)
- Game attendance: 71,105
- Referee: Larry Smith (Big Ten)
- TV announcers (ESPN): Joe Tessitore, Jesse Palmer, Katie George and Taylor McGregor
- ESPN box score / Official game book

The first game of the New Year's Day quarterfinal doubleheader matched No. 12 and Big 12 champion Arizona State, seeded fourth and making their CFP debut, against Texas. The Longhorns won the teams' only previous meeting in the 2007 Holiday Bowl 52–34.

Both teams opened the game with a score: Arizona State opened the game with a 12-play drive resulting in a 39-yard field goal by Carston Kieffer, and Texas scored in two plays on a 23-yard pass from Quinn Ewers to DeAndre Moore Jr. After the Sun Devils went three-and-out, the Longhorns stretched their lead with a 75-yard Silas Bolden punt return for a touchdown. The teams traded punts before an Arizona State turnover on downs led to a 22-yard Bert Auburn field goal for the Longhorns. The Sun Devils had an opportunity to answer with a field goal of their own but the 36-yard try was blocked, leading to a 17–3 halftime score.

After a Texas punt to begin the second half, Arizona State drove to the Texas 2-yard line but failed to score on 4th & Goal, giving the ball to Texas. The Longhorns fumbled on their next play, leading to a safety; Arizona State shrunk the deficit to nine points with a field goal on their ensuing drive. Both teams traded touchdowns on their first possessions of the fourth quarter: Texas on a 5-yard Ewers rush and Arizona State on a 42-yard pass from running back Cam Skattebo to Malik McClain. The Sun Devils got the ball back quickly following an interception by Javan Robinson; Skattebo scored on a 2-yard rush three plays later and converted the two-point try to tie the game at 24 points apiece. Auburn missed a 48-yard field goal for Texas and Arizona State punted before the Longhorns drove down, but Auburn missed again, from 38 yards off the left upright as time expired, and the game went to overtime.

On Arizona State's overtime possession, Sam Leavitt rushed for 16 yards to convert 3rd & 14 from the Texas 19-yard line, and Skattebo rushed for a 3-yard touchdown on the next play. Texas was held to 4th & 8 from the Arizona State 23-yard line (which became 4th & 13 from the 28-yard line after a false start penalty) on their possession and scored on a touchdown pass to Matthew Golden; the PAT tied the game. The Longhorns retook the lead on a pass to Gunnar Helm on the first play of the second overtime and scored their two-point try. Andrew Mukuba then intercepted Leavitt on Arizona State's subsequent possession to seal a 39–31 double-overtime victory.

==== Rose Bowl ====
2025 Rose Bowl

Quarter	1	2	3	4	Total
(8) No. 6 Ohio State	14	20	7	0	41
(1) No. 1 Oregon	0	8	7	6	21

at the Rose Bowl • Pasadena, California

- Date: January 1, 2025
- Game time: 2:00 p.m. PST
- Game weather: Sunny • 70 °F (21 °C)
- Game attendance: 90,732
- Referee: Adam Savoie (ACC)
- TV announcers (ESPN): Chris Fowler, Kirk Herbstreit, Holly Rowe and Stormy Buonantony
- ESPN box score / Official game book

The second part of the New Year's Day quarterfinal doubleheader matched No. 1 and Big Ten champion Oregon, making their second CFP appearance, against Ohio State. Entering the game, the Buckeyes led the series 9–2, including two previous Rose Bowl wins (1958 and 2010) and the 2015 (inaugural) CFP National Championship game.

Ohio State began the game with the ball and scored on their third play with a 45-yard Will Howard pass to Jeremiah Smith. Oregon went three-and-out on each of their first two drives and also punted to end their third drive, while the Buckeyes doubled their lead on a 42-yard pass from Howard to Emeka Egbuka and stretched their lead with a 46-yard Jayden Fielding field goal. From there, Oregon continued with a turnover on downs and two further three-and-outs, while Ohio State scored two additional touchdowns by Smith and TreVeyon Henderson and added another field goal to take a 34–0 lead. Oregon concluded the quarter with a 5-yard touchdown pass from Dillon Gabriel to Traeshon Holden; the two-point try was successful, making the halftime score 34–8.

Oregon opened the second half with another touchdown, this time on a 2-yard Noah Whittington rush. After a punt by each team, Ohio State responded with an 8-yard Henderson touchdown rush to cap a 6-play drive. Each team's next drive ended in another punt, both after four plays, before Oregon drove from their own 49-yard line in ten plays to score on a 27-yard pass from Gabriel to Holden. Oregon opted to attempt another two-point conversion, which was unsuccessful. This was the final scoring play of the contest; Ohio State punted twice more, Oregon punted once more, and the game concluded with a 41–21 Ohio State win.

==== Sugar Bowl ====
2025 Sugar Bowl

Quarter	1	2	3	4	Total
(7) No. 5 Notre Dame	0	13	7	3	23
(2) No. 2 Georgia	0	3	7	0	10

at the Caesars Superdome • New Orleans, Louisiana

- Date: January 2, 2025
- Game time: 3:00 p.m. CST
- Game weather: n/a (indoor stadium)
- Game attendance: 57,267
- Referee: Michael VanderVelde (Big 12)
- TV announcers (ESPN): Sean McDonough, Greg McElroy, Molly McGrath and Laura Rutledge
- ESPN box score / Official game book

The quarterfinals concluded with No. 2 and SEC champion Georgia facing Notre Dame. The Bulldogs, making their fourth CFP appearance, entered the game 3–0 against the Fighting Irish including a win in the 1981 Sugar Bowl. The game was postponed from January 1 following a terrorist attack on Bourbon Street in New Orleans on the morning of New Year's Day.

The game's first score came on its fifth drive; each team punted on their first drive, Georgia's second drive ended with a fumble at the Notre Dame 16-yard line, and Notre Dame punted for a second time before Georgia took a 3–0 lead on a 41-yard Peyton Woodring field goal. Notre Dame tied the game with a field goal of their own by Mitch Jeter on their following possession. After one additional Fighting Irish punt and two more from the Bulldogs, Notre Dame took their first lead with 39 seconds until halftime on another successful field goal. On Georgia's next play, RJ Oben sacked Gunner Stockton, forcing a fumble, and Junior Tuihalamaka recovered for Notre Dame, leading to a touchdown pass from Riley Leonard to Beaux Collins and a 13–3 lead for the Fighting Irish at halftime.

Notre Dame extended its lead on the opening kickoff of the second half, which was returned 98 yards for a touchdown by Jayden Harrison, capping a 17-point Irish run in a span of 54 seconds of game time. Georgia punted on 4th & 3 on their next drive, and the Irish went three-and-out in response. The Bulldogs pulled within ten points on a 5-play drive that followed, ending in a 32-yard touchdown pass from Stockton to Cash Jones, but they were unable to score further. They turned the ball over on downs on each of their final two offensive possessions, while Notre Dame added a 47-yard field goal in addition to a turnover on downs. Ultimately, the Irish ran out the clock to earn a semifinal berth with a 23–10 victory.

=== Semifinals ===
==== Orange Bowl ====
2025 Orange Bowl

Quarter	1	2	3	4	Total
(7) No. 5 Notre Dame	0	3	7	17	27
(6) No. 4 Penn State	0	10	0	14	24

at Hard Rock Stadium • Miami Gardens, Florida

- Date: January 9, 2025
- Game time: 7:30 p.m. EST
- Game weather: Clear • 56 °F (13 °C)
- Game attendance: 66,881
- Referee: Michael VanderVelde (Big 12)
- TV announcers (ESPN): Sean McDonough, Greg McElroy, Molly McGrath and Katie George
- ESPN box score / Official game book

The first semifinal matched Penn State against Notre Dame. Entering the game, the series between the Nittany Lions and the Fighting Irish was split 9–9–1, with Notre Dame winning the only prior postseason encounter in the 1976 Gator Bowl 20–9.

Penn State received the ball to begin the game, but no scoring took place until their third drive; the Nittany Lions punted on their first two drives, while Notre Dame punted on their first and their second ended with an interception by Zakee Wheatley. After the interception, Penn State took the ball on their own 42-yard line and finished the 14-play drive with a 20-yard Ryan Barker field goal. After a Notre Dame punt, Nicholas Singleton scored the game's first touchdown on a 5-yard rush with over two minutes remaining in the half. The Irish took the remainder of the quarter on their ensuing drive; they scored their first points on a 41-yard Mitch Jeter field goal as time expired, making the halftime score 10–3 in favor of the Nittany Lions.

The Fighting Irish tied the game on their first drive of the second half on a 3-yard rush by Riley Leonard. After two punts by Penn State and one by Notre Dame, the Irish took their first lead on the second play of the fourth quarter when Jeremiyah Love rushed for a 2-yard touchdown. This gave Notre Dame a 17–10 lead, though this did not last for long, as Penn State's ensuing seven-play drive resulted in a 7-yard Singleton touchdown rush with ten minutes remaining in the fourth quarter. After a touchback, Penn State resumed possession following an interception by Dani Dennis-Sutton at the Notre Dame 39-yard line. Penn State capitalized with another 7-yard Singleton touchdown rush five plays later, putting them back in the lead, but a 54-yard pass from Leonard to Jaden Greathouse tied the game again at 24. After a punt by each team, Drew Allar threw a cross-body pass which was intercepted by Christian Gray at the Penn State 42-yard line to give the Fighting Irish possession with 33 seconds left. Jeter made a 41-yard field goal with seven seconds left, ultimately giving Notre Dame a 27–24 victory and a national championship berth.

==== Cotton Bowl Classic ====
2025 Cotton Bowl Classic

Quarter	1	2	3	4	Total
(8) No. 6 Ohio State	7	7	0	14	28
(5) No. 3 Texas	0	7	7	0	14

at AT&T Stadium • Arlington, Texas

- Date: January 10, 2025
- Game time: 6:30 p.m. CST
- Game weather: n/a (retractable roof closed)
- Game attendance: 74,527
- Referee: Jerry Magallanes (ACC)
- TV announcers (ESPN): Chris Fowler, Kirk Herbstreit, Holly Rowe and Laura Rutledge
- ESPN box score / Official game book

The second semifinal matched Texas against Ohio State. The Longhorns entered the game 2–1 against the Buckeyes, including a 24–21 win in the 2009 Fiesta Bowl.

Texas started with possession, but Ohio State was the first to score; after a Longhorn turnover on downs, Ohio State drove ten plays and finished with a 9-yard rushing touchdown by Quinshon Judkins roughly halfway through the first quarter. Both teams punted on each of their next four drives, though only two of these eight possessions resulted in a three-and-out. The last six of these took place during the second quarter, and Texas tied the game with under thirty seconds left in the half on an 18-yard pass from Quinn Ewers to Jaydon Blue. The ensuing kickoff resulted in a touchback, and Ohio State retook the lead on their next play, a 75-yard touchdown pass from Will Howard to TreVeyon Henderson, with thirteen seconds left. As a result, the Buckeyes led 14–7 at halftime.

Ohio State's possession to start the second half was cut short following a David Gbenda interception at the Texas 30-yard line. Each team punted once before Texas evened the score again on a 26-yard Blue touchdown reception from Ewers. Ohio State punted on their next drive and Texas did the same; Texas's drive was interrupted by the end of the third quarter. After Ohio State resumed possession at their own 12-yard line with 14:40 left in the game, they drove 88 yards in 12 plays to retake the lead on a 1-yard rush by Judkins. That drive took nearly eight minutes, and Texas started their next drive with 6:58 remaining in the game following a touchback. The Longhorns drove to the Ohio State 1-yard line, but took several losses and faced 4th & Goal at the Ohio State 8-yard line. On that play, Ewers fumbled and the ball was recovered by Jack Sawyer, who returned it 83 yards for a touchdown. Ewers was intercepted by Caleb Downs on Texas's final drive, giving Ohio State a 28–14 victory.

=== Championship ===
2025 College Football Playoff National Championship

Quarter	1	2	3	4	Total
(8) No. 6 Ohio State	0	21	10	3	34
(7) No. 5 Notre Dame	7	0	8	8	23

at Mercedes-Benz Stadium • Atlanta, Georgia

- Date: January 20, 2025
- Game time: 7:30 p.m. EST
- Game weather: n/a (retractable roof closed)
- Game attendance: 77,660
- Referee: Steve Marlowe (SEC)
- TV announcers (ESPN): Chris Fowler, Kirk Herbstreit, Holly Rowe and Molly McGrath
- ESPN box score / Official game book

The national championship marked the ninth meeting between Ohio State and Notre Dame; the Buckeyes won the previous six games between the two, including a three-point win in their last matchup in September 2023.

Notre Dame began the game with the ball and capped their 18-play drive with a Riley Leonard touchdown run after nearly ten minutes of possession. That play was the only score of the first quarter, though Ohio State tied the game at seven on their first possession with an 8-yard touchdown from Will Howard to Jeremiah Smith. The Buckeyes ended the first half having scored 21 unanswered points, as Quinshon Judkins recorded a rushing touchdown and a receiving touchdown while the Ohio State defense held Notre Dame to two punts before their fourth drive concluded at halftime.

Ohio State continued their scoring streak to begin the third quarter; a 70-yard Judkins rush set up a touchdown several plays later, and the Buckeyes added a 46-yard Jayden Fielding field goal after forcing a turnover on downs on a failed Notre Dame fake punt at the Irish 33-yard line. Notre Dame cut the Ohio State lead to sixteen points with a Jaden Greathouse touchdown reception on the next drive and set themselves up for a short field goal try after an Ohio State fumble, but the 27-yard kick was missed by Jeter. After a Buckeye punt, Notre Dame narrowed the deficit to eight points following another touchdown reception by Greathouse and a two-point pass. On Ohio State's ensuing drive, they gained 56 yards on 3rd & 11 to prolong the possession and finished with a 33-yard field goal with 26 seconds remaining. That was the final scoring play of the game, giving Ohio State a 34–23 championship victory.

== Aftermath ==
Ohio State's playoff victory marked their ninth national championship and their second of the CFP era (2015). It was the first national championship for sixth-year Ohio State head coach Ryan Day.

The four first-round games, played for the first time as part of the new 12-team format, averaged 10.6 million viewers, while the inaugural CFP quarterfinals averaged 16.9 million viewers. Viewership for the semifinals dropped 17% to 19.2 million as compared to those of the year prior, which were played on New Year's Day. Ohio State's championship victory over Notre Dame was the most-watched college football game of the season at an average of 22.1 million viewers, though this figure represented a 12% drop from the year prior. Nine of the ten most-watched games of the season were part of the CFP.
