= Dominic DeLuca =

American football player (born 2001)

Profile
- Position: Linebacker

Personal information
- Born: West Pittston, Pennsylvania, U.S.
- Listed height: 6 ft 1 in (1.85 m)
- Listed weight: 228 lb (103 kg)

Career information
- High school: Wyoming Area (Exeter, Pennsylvania)
- College: Penn State (2021–2025)
- NFL draft: 2026: undrafted

Career history
- Baltimore Ravens (2026)*
- * Offseason or practice squad member only
- Stats at ESPN

Dominic Carl DeLuca (born September 25, 2001) is an American professional football linebacker. He played college football for the Penn State Nitanny Lions.

== Early life ==
DeLuca attended Wyoming Area High School in Luzerne County, Pennsylvania, where he led the football team to a PIAA title as a senior in 2019 despite suffering a torn ACL which he continued to play on. Coming out of high school, DeLuca committed to play college football for the Penn State Nittany Lions, joining the team as a walk-on.

== College career ==
As a freshman in 2021, DeLuca took a redshirt, appearing in just three games for Penn State. In 2022, he notched 29 tackles, a sack, and a blocked punt. Heading into the 2023 season, DeLuca was awarded a scholarship. In week 2 of the 2023 season, he returned an interception 26 yards for a touchdown versus Delaware. In 2023, DeLuca appeared in all 13 games for Penn State, where he tallied 29 tackles with four and a half being for a loss, a sack, three pass deflections, two interceptions, two forced fumbles, and a touchdown. During the first round of the 2024–25 College Football Playoff, DeLuca notched five tackles with half a tackle being for a loss, and a half a sack, but his two biggest plays were his two interceptions, one that he returned 23 yards for the game's first score, as he helped the Nittany Lions to a 38–10 win over the SMU Mustangs.

== Professional career ==
Pre-draft measurables
Height	Weight	Arm length	Hand span	Wingspan	40-yard dash	10-yard split	20-yard split	20-yard shuttle	Three-cone drill	Vertical jump	Broad jump	Bench press
6 ft 1 1/8 in (1.86 m)	228 lb (103 kg)	30 1/2 in (0.77 m)	9 1/4 in (0.23 m)	6 ft 2 in (1.88 m)	4.64 s	1.63 s	2.65 s	4.30 s	7.02 s	32.5 in (0.83 m)	9 ft 8 in (2.95 m)	11 reps
All values from Pro Day

DeLuca signed with the Baltimore Ravens as an undrafted free agent on April 26, 2026. On August 30, DeLuca was waived by the Ravens as a part of final roster cuts; he was re-signed to the team's practice squad the next day. On September 14, he was released.
