= Tyseer Denmark =

American football player

No. 19 – Virginia Tech Hokies
- Position: Wide receiver
- Class: Redshirt Sophomore

Personal information
- Listed height: 5 ft 10 in (1.78 m)
- Listed weight: 183 lb (83 kg)

Career information
- High school: Imhotep Institute Charter (Philadelphia, Pennsylvania)
- College: Penn State (2024–2025); Virginia Tech (2026–present)
- Stats at ESPN

Tyseer Tyrae Naquan Denmark is an American college football wide receiver for the Virginia Tech Hokies. He previously played for the Penn State Nittany Lions.

== Early life ==
Denmark played at Imhotep Institute Charter High School in Philadelphia. Coming out of high school, he was rated as a four-star recruit and the 12th overall player in Pennsylvania. Initially, Denmark committed to play college football for the Oregon Ducks over offers from Ohio State and Penn State. However, he later de-committed and signed to play for the Penn State Nittany Lions.

== College career ==
In the 2024 regular season finale, Denmark hauled in his first collegiate touchdown in a win over Maryland. He finished the 2024 season, appearing in four games, where he hauled in two passes for 28 yards and a touchdown, while also returning two punts for 16 yards. Heading into the 2025 season, Denmark is competing to start at receiver for the Nittany Lions.
