= Tony Rojas =

American football player (born 2005)

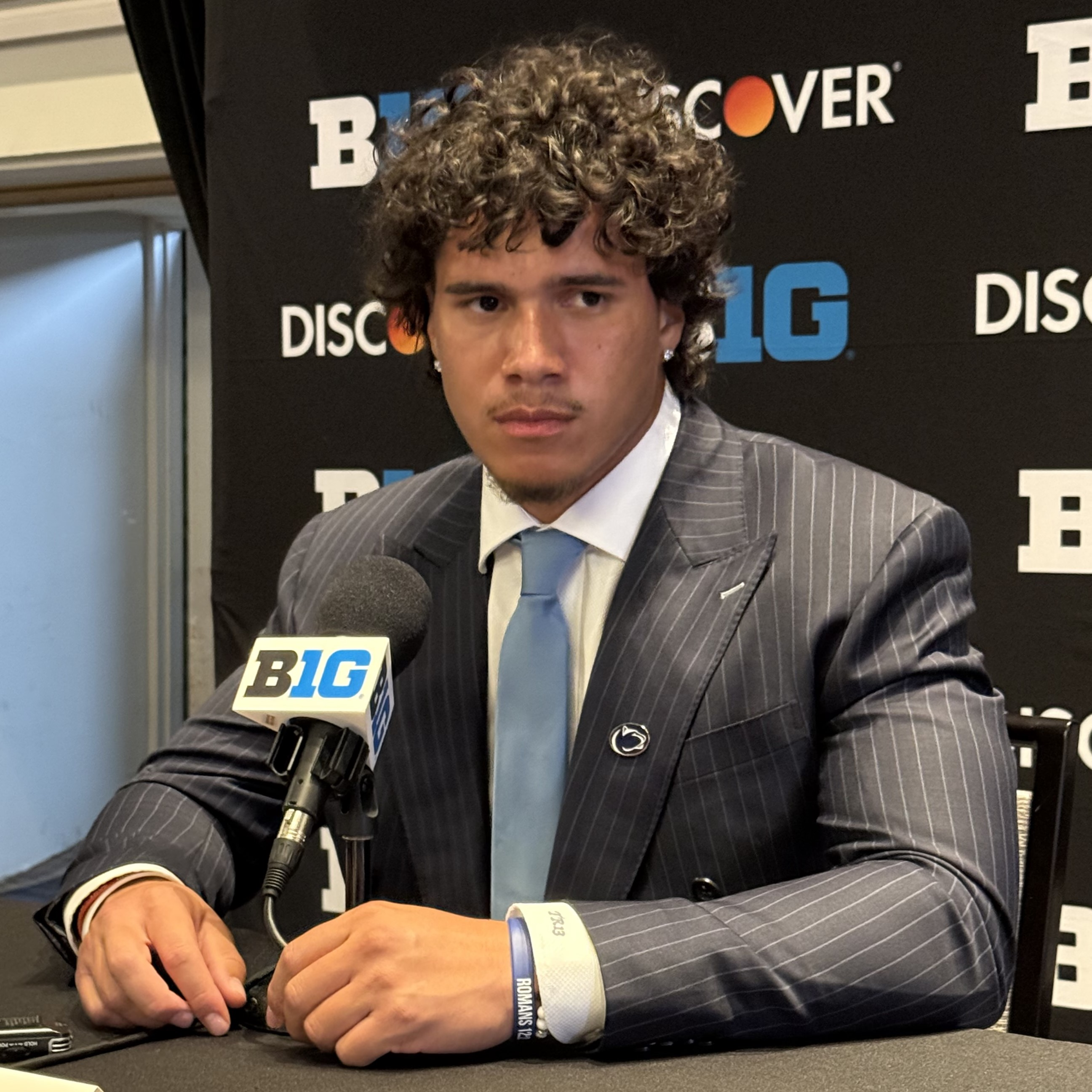
- Rojas at 2026 Big Ten Media Day

No. 13 – Penn State Nittany Lions
- Position: Linebacker
- Class: Redshirt Junior

Personal information
- Born: April 8, 2005 (age 21)
- Listed height: 6 ft 2 in (1.88 m)
- Listed weight: 236 lb (107 kg)

Career information
- High school: Fairfax (Fairfax, Virginia)
- College: Penn State (2023–present)
- Stats at ESPN

Anthony Daniel Rojas (born April 8, 2005) is an American college football linebacker for the Penn State Nittany Lions.

== Early life ==
Rojas is from Fairfax, Virginia, where he attended Fairfax High School, where he was a two-way football player at running back and linebacker. He was team captain in his last two years and was first-team all-region and the region offensive player of the year as a junior in 2021, after running for 1,568 yards and 24 touchdowns. Rojas then ran for 2,239 yards and 35 touchdowns with 72 tackles and 13 sacks as a senior in 2022, being named the All-Metro Offensive Player of the Year. He was invited to the All-American Bowl and was named the Gatorade Virginia Player of the Year.

In 2022, as a four-star recruit, Rojas committed to play college football for the Penn State Nittany Lions.

== College career ==
In 2023, as a true freshman, Rojas impressed early and saw immediate playing time with Penn State. In the 2023 Penn State season, he ultimately appeared in 13 games and totaled 22 tackles, 3.5 tackles-for-loss, an interception and a forced fumble.
