= 2023 Wisconsin Badgers football team =

American college football season

2023 Wisconsin Badgers football

ReliaQuest Bowl, L 31–35 vs. LSU
- Conference: Big Ten Conference
- West Division
- Record: 7–6 (5–4 Big Ten)
- Head coach: Luke Fickell (1st season)
- Offensive coordinator: Phil Longo (1st season)
- Offensive scheme: Air raid
- Defensive coordinator: Mike Tressel (1st season)
- Co-defensive coordinator: Colin Hitschler (1st season)
- Base defense: 3–3–5
- Captains: Chimere Dike; Tanner Mordecai; Maema Njongmeta; Marty Strey
- Home stadium: Camp Randall Stadium

Uniform
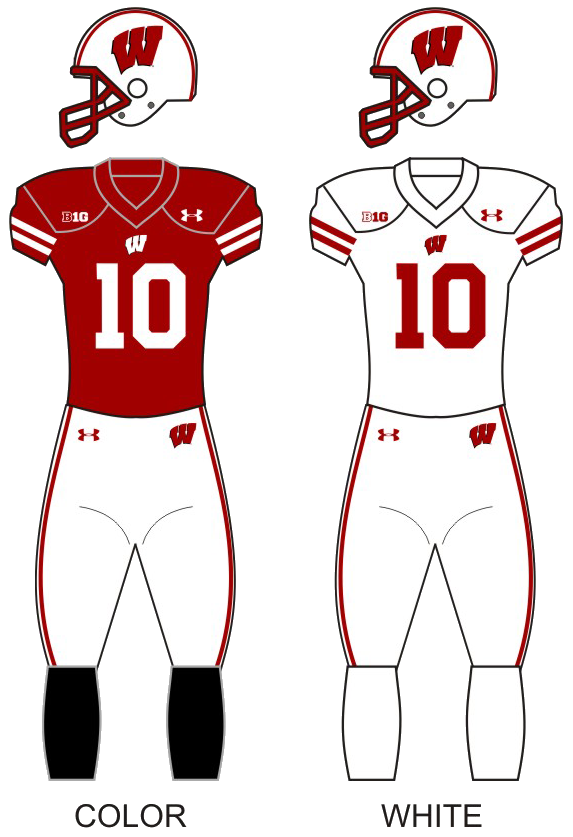

2023 Big Ten Conference football standings
| | Conf. | | | Overall |
| Team | W | | L | W | | L |
|---|---|---|---|---|---|---|
East Division
| No. 1 Michigan xy$#^ | 9 | – | 0 | 15 | – | 0 |
| No. 10 Ohio State | 8 | – | 1 | 11 | – | 2 |
| No. 13 Penn State | 7 | – | 2 | 10 | – | 3 |
| Maryland | 4 | – | 5 | 8 | – | 5 |
| Rutgers | 3 | – | 6 | 7 | – | 6 |
| Indiana | 1 | – | 8 | 3 | – | 9 |
| Michigan State† | 0 | – | 7 | 0 | – | 8 |
West Division
| No. 24 Iowa xy | 7 | – | 2 | 10 | – | 4 |
| Northwestern | 5 | – | 4 | 8 | – | 5 |
| Wisconsin | 5 | – | 4 | 7 | – | 6 |
| Minnesota | 3 | – | 6 | 6 | – | 7 |
| Illinois | 3 | – | 6 | 5 | – | 7 |
| Nebraska | 3 | – | 6 | 5 | – | 7 |
| Purdue | 3 | – | 6 | 4 | – | 8 |
Championship: Michigan 26, Iowa 0
# – College Football Playoff champion; ^ – College Football Playoff participant; $ – Conference champion; x – Division champion/co-champions; y – Championship game participant; † — NCAA vacated all wins for Michigan State (4–8, 2–7); Rankings from AP Poll

The 2023 Wisconsin Badgers football team represented the University of Wisconsin–Madison as a member of the West Division of the Big Ten Conference during the 2023 NCAA Division I FBS football season. The Badgers were led by first-year head coach Luke Fickell. The team played their home games at Camp Randall Stadium in Madison, Wisconsin.

== Offseason ==
=== 2023 NFL draft ===
| Round | Pick | Player | Position | NFL Club |
|---|---|---|---|---|
| 2 | 43 | Joe Tippmann | C | New York Jets |
| 2 | 49 | Keeanu Benton | NT | Pittsburgh Steelers |
| 4 | 132 | Nick Herbig | OLB | Pittsburgh Steelers |
| Undrafted | | Tyler Beach | OT | Houston Texans |

=== Transfers ===
Wisconsin outgoing transfers
| Name | Number | Pos. | Height | Weight | Year | Hometown | Transfer to |
|---|---|---|---|---|---|---|---|
| Deacon Hill | #10 | QB | 6'3 | 262 | Freshman (redshirt) | Santa Barbara, CA | Iowa |
| Logan Brown | #50 | OL | 6'6 | 310 | Junior (redshirt) | Grand Rapids, MI | Kansas |
| Stephan Bracey | #10 | WR | 5'10 | 182 | Junior (redshirt) | Grand Rapids, MI | Central Michigan |
| Graham Mertz | #5 | QB | 6'3 | 216 | Junior (redshirt) | Overland Park, KS | Florida |
| Titus Toler | #41 | S | 5'11 | 180 | Junior (redshirt) | Bellflower, CA | Boise State |
| Tristan Monday | #91 | DE | 6'4 | 274 | Freshman | Scottsdale, AZ | Arizona State |
| Isaac Guerendo | #20 | RB | 6'0 | 223 | Senior (redshirt) | Clayton, IN | Louisville |
| Semar Melvin | #20 | CB | 5'11 | 178 | Junior (redshirt) | Pembroke Pines, FL | Michigan State |
| Jaylan Franklin | #81 | TE | 6'4 | 243 | Senior (redshirt) | Brownstown, MI | Michigan State |
| Dean Engram | #6 | WR | 5'9 | 170 | Senior (redshirt) | Washington, DC | UConn |
| Julius Davis | #32 | RB | 5'10 | 201 | Senior (redshirt) | Menomonee Falls, WI | Montana State |
| Spencer Lytle | #7 | ILB | 6'2 | 234 | Senior (redshirt) | Redondo Beach, CA | Stanford |
| Avyonne Jones | #8 | CB | 5'11 | 187 | Freshman (redshirt) | Southlake, TX | Coastal Carolina |
| Vito Calvaruso | #91 | K | 6'3 | 198 | Senior (redshirt) | Jefferson City, MO | |
| Al Ashford III | #30 | CB | 6'0 | 181 | Sophomore (redshirt) | Denver, CO | Utah State |
| A'Khoury Lyde | #4 | CB | 5'9 | 191 | Freshman (redshirt) | Wayne, NJ | Delaware |
| Marshall Howe | #12 | QB | 6'1 | 187 | Freshman (redshirt) | Pacific Palisades, CA | Yale |
| Markus Allen | #14 | WR | 6'1 | 190 | Sophomore (redshirt) | Clayton, OH | |
| Drew Evans | #77 | OL | 6'5 | 260 | Freshman (redshirt) | Fort Atkinson, WI | Indiana |
| Keontez Lewis* | #3 | WR | 6'2 | 196 | Junior | East St. Louis, IL | Southern Illinois |
| Dylan Barrett* | #61 | OL | 6'5 | 320 | Junior (redshirt) | St. Charles, IL | Iowa State |
| Myles Burkett* | #16 | QB | 6'0 | 202 | Freshman (redshirt) | Franklin, WI | Albany |
| Ross Gengler* | #53 | OLB | 6'2 | 230 | Junior (redshirt) | Delavan, WI | Wisconsin–La Crosse |
| Chimere Dike* | #13 | WR | 6'1 | 200 | Senior | Waukesha, WI | Florida |
| Skyler Bell* | #11 | WR | 6'0 | 195 | Sophomore (redshirt) | Bronx, NY | UConn |
| Jordan Mayer* | #95 | OLB | 6'4 | 235 | Freshman | Jefferson Hills, PA | Penn State |
| Trey Wedig* | #78 | OL | 6'7 | 315 | Junior (redshirt) | Oconomowoc, WI | Indiana |
| Jordan Turner* | #54 | ILB | 6'1 | 238 | Junior (redshirt) | Farmington, MI | Michigan State |
| Rodas Johnson* | #56 | DE | 6'2 | 295 | Senior (redshirt) | Columbus, OH | Texas A&M |
| Darian Varner* | #19 | DE | 6'3 | 275 | Junior (redshirt) | Norfolk, VA | Cincinnati |
| Keane Bessert* | #60 | LS | 6'2 | 230 | Freshman | Fruita, CO | Kansas State |

*Entered NCAA transfer portal midseason or prior to bowl game

Wisconsin incoming transfers
| Name | Number | Pos. | Height | Weight | Year | Hometown | Previous team |
|---|---|---|---|---|---|---|---|
| Nick Evers | #7 | QB | 6'3 | 186 | Freshman (redshirt) | Flower Mound, TX | Oklahoma |
| Tanner Mordecai | #8 | QB | 6'3 | 214 | Graduate Student | Waco, TX | SMU |
| Jason Maitre | #3 | S | 5'10 | 188 | Graduate Student | Orlando, FL | Boston College |
| Darian Varner | #9 | DE | 6'2 | 260 | Junior | Norfolk, VA | Temple |
| Joe Huber | #60 | OT | 6'5 | 310 | Junior (redshirt) | Dublin, OH | Cincinnati |
| Jake Renfro | #56 | OL | 6'3 | 290 | Senior | Mokena, IL | Cincinnati |
| Jeff Pietrowski | #47 | DE | 6'1 | 250 | Junior (redshirt) | Lakewood, OH | Michigan State |
| Braedyn Locke | #16 | QB | 6'1 | 195 | Freshman (redshirt) | Rockwall, TX | Mississippi State |
| Nathanial Vakos | #90 | K | 6'1 | 188 | Sophomore | Avon, OH | Ohio |
| Will Pauling | #19 | WR | 5'10 | 165 | Sophomore (redshirt) | Chicago, IL | Cincinnati |
| Quincy Burroughs | #12 | WR | 6'2 | 202 | Freshman (redshirt) | Jacksonville, FL | Cincinnati |
| C.J. Williams | #8 | WR | 6'2 | 190 | Sophomore | Santa Ana, CA | USC |
| Bryson Green | #9 | WR | 6'0 | 203 | Junior | Allen, TX | Oklahoma State |
| Nyzier Fourqurean | #12 | CB | 6'1 | 185 | Junior | Mentor, OH | Grand Valley State |
| Michael Mack | #9 | CB | 6'1 | 180 | Junior | Potomac, MD | Air Force |

== Preseason ==
=== Spring game ===
The Badgers held a spring game titled "The Launch" on April 22, 2023 at Camp Randall Stadium.

2023 The Launch Spring Game

| Quarter | 1 | 2 | Total |
|---|---|---|---|
| White | 21 | 12 | 33 |
| Red | 14 | 10 | 24 |

at Camp Randall Stadium, Madison, WI

- Date: April 22, 2023
- Game time: 1:00 p.m.

=== Preseason Big Ten poll ===
Although the Big Ten Conference has not held an official preseason poll since 2010, Cleveland.com has polled sports journalists representing all member schools as a de facto preseason media poll since 2011. For the 2023 poll, Wisconsin was projected to finish first in the West Division.

== Schedule ==
| Date | Time | Opponent | Rank | Site | TV | Result | Attendance |
|---|---|---|---|---|---|---|---|
| September 2, 2023 | 2:30 p.m. | Buffalo* | No. 19 | Camp Randall Stadium; Madison, WI | FS1 | W 38–17 | 76,224 |
| September 9 | 6:30 p.m. | at Washington State* | No. 19 | Martin Stadium; Pullman, WA | ABC | L 22–31 | 33,024 |
| September 16 | 11:00 a.m. | Georgia Southern* | | Camp Randall Stadium; Madison, WI | BTN | W 35–14 | 75,610 |
| September 22 | 6:00 p.m. | at Purdue | | Ross–Ade Stadium; West Lafayette, IN | FS1 | W 38–17 | 55,529 |
| October 7 | 11:00 a.m. | Rutgers^{†} | | Camp Randall Stadium; Madison, WI | Peacock | W 24–13 | 74,885 |
| October 14 | 3:00 p.m. | Iowa | | Camp Randall Stadium; Madison, WI (Heartland Trophy) | FOX | L 6–15 | 76,205 |
| October 21 | 2:30 p.m. | at Illinois | | Memorial Stadium; Champaign, IL | FS1 | W 25–21 | 54,205 |
| October 28 | 6:30 p.m. | No. 3 Ohio State | | Camp Randall Stadium; Madison, WI | NBC | L 10–24 | 76,453 |
| November 4 | 11:00 a.m. | at Indiana | | Memorial Stadium; Bloomington, IN | BTN | L 14–20 | 45,466 |
| November 11 | 2:30 p.m. | Northwestern | | Camp Randall Stadium; Madison, WI | FS1 | L 10–24 | 76,124 |
| November 18 | 6:30 p.m. | Nebraska | | Camp Randall Stadium; Madison, WI (Freedom Trophy) | NBC | W 24–17 ^{OT} | 72,237 |
| November 25 | 2:30 p.m. | at Minnesota | | Huntington Bank Stadium; Minneapolis, MN (Paul Bunyan's Axe) | FS1 | W 28–14 | 48,119 |
| January 1, 2024 | 11:00 a.m. | vs. No. 13 LSU* | | Raymond James Stadium; Tampa, FL (ReliaQuest Bowl) | ESPN2 | L 31–35 | 31,424 |
*Non-conference game; ^{†}Homecoming; Rankings from AP Poll released prior to the game; All times are in Central time; Source:

== Personnel ==
=== Coaching staff ===
Wisconsin football current coaching staff
| Name | Position | Alma mater | Years at Wisconsin |
|---|---|---|---|
| Luke Fickell | Head Coach | Ohio State University | 1st |
| Phil Longo | Offensive coordinator/quarterbacks | Rowan University | 1st |
| Mike Tressel | Defensive coordinator/inside linebackers | Cornell College (IA) | 1st |
| Colin Hitschler | Co-defensive coordinator/safeties | University of Pennsylvania | 1st |
| Jack Bicknell Jr. | Offensive line | Boston College | 1st |
| Mike Brown | Associate head coach/wide receivers | Liberty University | 1st |
| Devon Spalding | Running backs | Central Michigan University | 1st |
| Nate Letton | Tight ends | Centre College | 1st |
| Paul Haynes | Cornerbacks | Kent State University | 1st |
| Greg Scruggs | Defensive line | University of Louisville | 1st |
| Matt Mitchell | Special teams coordinator/outside linebackers | Cornell College (IA) | 1st |
| Greg Gillum | Chief of staff | Ohio State University | 1st |
| Pat Lambert | Director of recruiting | University of Cincinnati | 1st |
| Max Stienecker | Director of recruiting strategy | University of Cincinnati | 1st |
| Brady Collins | Director of football strength & conditioning | University of Kentucky | 1st |

=== Roster ===
2023 Wisconsin Badgers football roster
| Quarterback: 7 Nick Evers – (redshirt) freshman (6'3, 196); 8 Tanner Mordecai – (redshirt) senior (6'2, 218); 16 Myles Burkett – (redshirt) freshman (6'0, 202); 17 Cole LaCrue – freshman (6'1, 197); 18 Braedyn Locke – (redshirt) freshman (6'0, 200); Running back: 0 Braelon Allen – junior (6'2, 245); 1 Chez Mellusi – graduate student (5'11, 212); 20 Nate White – freshman (5'11, 170); 25 Cade Yacamelli – (redshirt) freshman (6'0, 213); 34 Jackson Acker – (redshirt) sophomore (6'1, 235); 43 Grover Bortolotti – (redshirt) sophomore (5'9, 192); 44 Zach Gloudeman – (redshirt) freshman (6'2, 218); Wide receiver: 4 C.J. Williams – freshman (6'1, 197); 5 Quincy Burroughs – (redshirt) freshman (6'3, 208); 9 Bryson Green – (redshirt) junior (6'0, 215); 11 Skyler Bell – (redshirt) sophomore (6'0, 195); 12 Trech Kekahuna – freshman (5'10, 180); 13 Chimere Dike – senior (6'1, 200); 15 Tommy McIntosh – (redshirt) freshman (6'5, 205); 19 Will Pauling – (redshirt) sophomore (5'10, 187); 21 Cam Fane – (redshirt) freshman (6'1, 184); 23 Davion Thomas – freshman (5'11, 174); 26 Grady O'Neill – (redshirt) freshman (5'11, 160); 27 Haakon Anderson – (redshirt) junior (6'1, 210); 30 Alex Moeller – (redshirt) sophomore (5'11, 180); 84 Christopher Brooks Jr. – (redshirt) freshman (6'2, 225); 86 Vinny Anthony II – sophomore (6'0, 183); Tight end: 37 Riley Nowakowski – (redshirt) junior (6'1, 243); 38 Tucker Ashcraft – freshman (6'5, 245); 41 JT Seagreaves – sophomore (6'6, 245); 48 Cole Dakovich – (redshirt) junior (6'5, 255); 49 Cam Large – (redshirt) junior (6'3, 237); 81 Angel Toombs – freshman (6'5, 245); 87 Hayden Rucci – (redshirt) senior (6'4, 253); 89 Jack Pugh – (redshirt) sophomore (6'5, 257) | Offensive lineman: 56 Joe Brunner – (redshirt) freshman (6'5, 317); 57 Jake Renfro – (redshirt) junior (6'4, 310); 60 Joe Huber – (redshirt) junior (6'5, 311); 61 Dylan Barrett – (redshirt) junior (6'5, 320); 62 Max Rader – (redshirt) freshman (6'6, 283); 63 Tanor Bortolini – (redshirt) junior (6'4, 313); 64 Sean Timmis – (redshirt) sophomore (6'4, 305); 65 James Durand – freshman (6'5, 303); 66 Nolan Rucci – (redshirt) sophomore (6'8, 300); 67 JP Benzschawel – (redshirt) sophomore (6'6, 312); 70 Barrett Nelson – (redshirt) freshman (6'6, 292); 71 Riley Mahlman – (redshirt) sophomore (6'8, 315); 72 Zack Mlsna – freshman (6'7, 328); 73 Kerry Kodanko – junior (6'2, 315); 74 Michael Furtney – graduate student (6'5, 315); 76 John Clifford – (redshirt) freshman (6'5, 304); 77 Peyton Lange – freshman (6'9, 340); 78 Trey Wedig – (redshirt) junior (6'7, 315); 79 Jack Nelson – (redshirt) junior (6'7, 310); Defensive lineman: 19 Darian Varner – DE – (redshirt) junior (6'3, 275); 56 Rodas Johnson – DE – (redshirt) senior (6'2, 295); 58 Gabe Kirschke – DT – (redshirt) freshman (6'5, 250); 68 Ben Barten – DE – (redshirt) junior (6'5, 303); 76 Tommy Brunner – DE – (redshirt) senior (6'3, 250); 77 Will McDonald – DT – freshman (6'4, 254); 84 Manny Mullens – DE – sophomore (6'2, 276); 85 Nolan Vils – DT – freshman (6'2, 271); 90 James Thompson Jr. – DE – (redshirt) junior (6'5, 288); 91 Jamel Howard – DT – freshman (6'2, 318); 92 Curtis Neal – NT – (redshirt) freshman (6'0, 290); 93 Isaac Townsend – DE – (redshirt) senior (6'5, 277); 94 Gio Paez – DE – (redshirt) senior (6'3, 310); 96 Cade McDonald – DE – (redshirt) junior (6'6, 285); 97 Mike Jarvis – DE – (redshirt) sophomore (6'4, 288); 99 Isaiah Mullens – DE – graduate student (6'4, 298); Long snappers: 47 Peter Bowden – (redshirt) senior (6'2, 242); 60 Keane Bessert – freshman (6'2, 230); 64 Duncan McKinley – (redshirt) junior (6'2, 224); 69 Zach Zei – (redshirt) sophomore (6'2, 217); Kicker: 22 Jack Van Dyke – senior (6'5, 228); 29 Nate Van Zelst – (redshirt) sophomore (5'11, 200); 90 Nathanial Vakos – freshman (6'1, 200); 97 Gavin Lahm – sophomore (6'0, 216); Punter: 28 Gavin Meyers – (redshirt) junior (6'1, 203); 49 Atticus Bertrams – freshman (6'3, 225) | Linebacker: 3 T.J. Bollers – OLB – (redshirt) sophomore (6'2, 270); 17 Darryl Peterson – OLB – (redshirt) sophomore (6'1, 245); 27 Tyler Jansey – ILB – freshman (6'0, 230); 28 Christian Alliegro – freshman (6'4, 228); 32 Marty Strey – OLB – graduate student (6'2, 235); 36 Jake Chaney – ILB – junior (5'11, 235); 39 Tatum Grass – ILB – (redshirt) senior (6'2, 234); 44 Jeff Pietrowski – OLB – (redshirt) junior (6'2, 243); 45 Garrison Solliday – ILB – (redshirt) sophomore (5'11, 233); 47 Evan Van Dyn Hoven – freshman (6'3, 228); 50 Aidan Vaughan – ILB – (redshirt) freshman (6'2, 224); 51 Bryan Sanborn – ILB – (redshirt) sophomore (6'1, 233); 52 Kaden Johnson – OLB – (redshirt) junior (6'2, 248); 53 Ross Gengler – OLB – (redshirt) junior (6'2, 230); 54 Jordan Turner – ILB – (redshirt) junior (6'1, 238); 55 Maema Njongmeta – ILB – (redshirt) senior (6'0, 240); 59 Aaron Witt – OLB – (redshirt) junior (6'6, 254); 95 Jordan Mayer – OLB – freshman (6'4, 235); 98 C.J. Goetz – OLB – graduate student (6'3, 240); Defensive back: 2 Ricardo Hallman – CB – (redshirt) sophomore (5'10, 185); 7 Michael Mack – CB – junior (6'1, 180); 9 Austin Brown – S – sophomore (6'1, 210); 10 Nyzier Fourqurean – CB – junior (6'1, 190); 11 Alexander Smith – CB – graduate student (5'11, 187); 12 Max Lofy – CB – (redshirt) junior (5'10, 189); 13 Kamo'i Latu – S – senior (6'0, 207); 14 Preston Zachman – S – (redshirt) sophomore (6'1, 208); 16 Amare Snowden – CB – freshman (6'4, 199); 18 Owen Arnett – S – (redshirt) sophomore (5'11, 212); 20 Braedyn Moore – S – freshman (6'2, 200); 21 Jonas Duclona – CB – freshman (5'10, 188); 22 Jace Arnold – CB – freshman (5'9, 186); 23 Jason Maitre – CB – (redshirt) senior (5'10, 188); 24 Hunter Wohler – S – junior (6'2, 210); 25 Justin Taylor – freshman (6'0, 195); 26 Travian Blaylock – S – graduate student (5'11, 208); 29 AJ Tisdell – CB – freshman (5'11, 189); 34 Charlie Jarvis – S – (redshirt) freshman (6'1, 205); 37 Bryce Carey – S – (redshirt) junior (6'1, 198); 43 Jackson Trudgeon – S – (redshirt) freshman (6'1, 202); 46 Deven Magli – S – (redshirt) freshman (6'1, 198) |

== Rankings ==
Ranking movements Legend: ██ Increase in ranking ██ Decrease in ranking — = Not ranked RV = Received votes
| | Week | | | | | | | | | | | | | | | |
| Poll | Pre | 1 | 2 | 3 | 4 | 5 | 6 | 7 | 8 | 9 | 10 | 11 | 12 | 13 | 14 | Final |
|---|---|---|---|---|---|---|---|---|---|---|---|---|---|---|---|---|
| AP | 19 | 19 | RV | RV | RV | RV | RV | — | RV | — | — | — | — | — | — | — |
| Coaches | 21 | 19 | RV | — | — | RV | RV | — | RV | — | — | — | — | — | — | — |
| CFP | Not released | | | | | | | | | — | — | — | — | — | — | Not released |

== Game summaries ==
=== Buffalo ===
Buffalo vs. No. 19 Wisconsin – Game summary

| Quarter | 1 | 2 | 3 | 4 | Total |
|---|---|---|---|---|---|
| Bulls | 7 | 3 | 0 | 7 | 17 |
| No. 19 Badgers | 7 | 7 | 14 | 10 | 38 |

at Camp Randall Stadium, Madison, Wisconsin

- Date: September 2, 2023
- Game time: 2:30 p.m.
- Game weather: 88 °F (31 °C); Sunny; Wind at S13 MPH
- Game attendance: 76,224
- Referee: Kole Knueppel
- TV announcers (FS1): Eric Collins (play-by-play) and Devin Gardner (analyst)

Game information

First quarter

- WIS – Chez Mellusi 1-yard run (Nathanial Vakos kick), 7:16 Wisconsin 7–0 Drive: 11 plays, 73 yards, 3:53.
- BUF – Cole Harrity 7-yard pass from Cole Snyder (Alex McNulty kick), 5:07. Tied 7–7. Drive: 5 plays, 65 yards, 2:09.

Second quarter

- WIS – Chimere Dike 29-yard pass from Tanner Mordecai (Nathanial Vakos kick), 1:00. Wisconsin 14–7. Drive: 6 plays, 55 yards, 2:08.
- BUF – Alex McNulty 53-yard field goal, 0:07. Wisconsin 14–10. Drive: 7 plays, 40 yards, 0:53.

Third quarter

- WIS – Chez Mellusi 89-yard run (Nathanial Vakos kick), 8:28 Wisconsin 21–10 Drive: 1 plays, 89 yards, 0:15.
- WIS – Braelon Allen 6-yard run (Nathanial Vakos kick), 2:37 Wisconsin 28–10 Drive: 8 plays, 97 yards, 3:13.

Fourth quarter

- WIS – Nathanial Vakos 37-yard field goal, 13:45. Wisconsin 31–10. Drive: 6 plays, 31 yards, 2:56.
- BUF – Cole Harrity 3-yard pass from Cole Snyder (Alex McNulty kick), 7:43. Wisconsin 31–17. Drive: 3 plays, 11 yards, 0:40.
- WIS – Braelon Allen 22-yard run (Nathanial Vakos kick), 6:38 Wisconsin 38–17 Drive: 3 plays, 46 yards, 1:05.

Top passers

- WIS – Tanner Mordecai – 24/31, 189 yards, 1 TD, 2 INT
- BUF – Cole Snyder – 26/41, 194 yards, 2 TD

Top rushers

- WIS – Chez Mellusi – 13 rushes, 157 yards, 2 TD
- BUF – Mike Washington – 12 rushes, 52 yards

Top receivers

- WIS – Will Pauling – 5 receptions, 55 yards
- BUF – Cole Harrity – 5 receptions, 47 yards, 2 TD

Top defenders

- WIS – Hunter Wohler – 11 tackles
- BUF – Shaun Dolac – 8 tackles, 1 TFL, INT

=== at Washington State ===
No. 19 Wisconsin vs. Washington State – Game summary

| Quarter | 1 | 2 | 3 | 4 | Total |
|---|---|---|---|---|---|
| No. 19 Badgers | 3 | 6 | 13 | 0 | 22 |
| Cougars | 7 | 17 | 0 | 7 | 31 |

at Martin Stadium, Pullman, Washington

- Date: September 9, 2023
- Game time: 6:30 p.m.
- Game weather: 84 °F (29 °C); Sunny; Wind at NE6 MPH
- Game attendance: 33,024
- Referee: Tyler Wadekamper
- TV announcers (ABC): Mark Jones (play-by-play), Louis Riddick (analyst), and Quint Kessenich (sideline)

Game information

First quarter

- WSU – Kyle Williams 4-yard pass from Cam Ward (Dean Janikowski kick), 5:34. Washington State 7–0. Drive: 8 plays, 62 yards, 4:02.
- WIS – Nathanial Vakos 49-yard field goal, 1:07. Washington State 7–3. Drive: 10 plays, 29 yards, 4:21.

Second quarter

- WSU – Lincoln Victor 1-yard pass from Cam Ward (Dean Janikowski kick), 14:10. Washington State 14–3. Drive: 5 plays, 87 yards, 1:44.
- WIS – Nathanial Vakos 34-yard field goal, 10:17. Washington State 14–6. Drive: 9 plays, 59 yards, 3:53.
- WSU – Dean Janikowski 46-yard field goal, 7:14. Washington State 17–6. Drive: 9 plays, 46 yards, 3:03.
- WSU – Brennan Jackson 2-yard fumble return (Dean Janikowski kick), 2:08. Washington State 24–6. 0:41.
- WIS – Nathanial Vakos 29-yard field goal, 0:21. Washington State 24–9. Drive: 8 plays, 64 yards, 1:47.

Third quarter

- WIS – Chez Mellusi 2-yard run (Nathanial Vakos kick), 6:15 Washington State 24–16 Drive: 7 plays, 34 yards, 3:58.
- WIS – Skyler Bell 16-yard pass from Tanner Mordecai (failed 2-point conversion attempt by Chez Mellusi), 0:25. Washington State 24–22. Drive: 5 plays, 80 yards, 2:08.

Fourth quarter

- WSU – Nakia Watson 1-yard run (Dean Janikowski kick), 5:30. Washington State 31–22 Drive: 10 plays, 57 yards, 3:49.

Top passers

- WIS – Tanner Mordecai – 25/40, 278 yards, 1 TD
- WSU – Cam Ward – 20/32, 212 yards, 2 TD

Top rushers

- WIS – Chez Mellusi – 12 rushes, 49 yards, 1 TD
- WSU – Cam Ward – 17 rushes, 43 yards

Top receivers

- WIS – Will Pauling – 5 receptions, 78 yards
- WSU – Lincoln Victor – 7 receptions, 55 yards, 1 TD

Top defenders

- WIS – Hunter Wohler – 13 tackles, 1 TFL, 1 PD
- WSU – Jaden Hicks – 9 tackles, 1 TFL, 2 PD

=== Georgia Southern ===
Georgia Southern vs. Wisconsin – Game summary

| Quarter | 1 | 2 | 3 | 4 | Total |
|---|---|---|---|---|---|
| Eagles | 0 | 7 | 7 | 0 | 14 |
| Badgers | 0 | 7 | 21 | 7 | 35 |

at Camp Randall Stadium, Madison, Wisconsin

- Date: September 16, 2023
- Game time: 11:00 a.m.
- Game weather: 69 °F (21 °C); Cloudy; Wind at NW4 MPH
- Game attendance: 75,610
- Referee: Tim O'Dey
- TV announcers (BTN): Mark Followill (play-by-play), Matt Millen (analyst) and Elise Menaker (sideline)

Game information

First quarter

No scoring

Second quarter

- WIS – Tanner Mordecai 1-yard run (Nathanial Vakos kick), 14:18 Wisconsin 7–0 Drive: 11 plays, 70 yards, 4:40.
- GASO – OJ Arnold 4-yard run (Michael Lantz kick), 12:11 Tied 7–7 Drive: 4 plays, 77 yards, 2:03.

Third quarter

- GASO – Jjay Mcafee 25-yard pass from Davis Brin (Michael Lantz kick), 12:33. Georgia Southern 14–7. Drive: 3 plays, 75 yards, 1:04.
- WIS – Braelon Allen 4-yard run (Nathanial Vakos kick), 10:53 Tied 14–14 Drive: 5 plays, 58 yards, 1:35.
- WIS – Tanner Mordecai 18-yard run (Nathanial Vakos kick), 7:40 Wisconsin 21–14 Drive: 6 plays, 40 yards, 1:59.
- WIS – Braelon Allen 2-yard run (Nathanial Vakos kick), 0:39 Wisconsin 28–14 Drive: 10 plays, 80 yards, 5:05.

Fourth quarter

- WIS – Chez Mellusi 1-yard run (Nathanial Vakos kick), 5:51 Wisconsin 35–14 Drive: 7 plays, 86 yards, 3:41.

Top passers

- WIS – Tanner Mordecai – 19/30, 236 yards
- GASO – Davis Brin – 33/52, 383 yards, 1 TD, 5 INT

Top rushers

- WIS – Braelon Allen – 12 rushes, 94 yards, 2 TD
- GASO – OJ Arnold – 10 rushes, 66 yards, 1 TD

Top receivers

- WIS – Chimere Dike – 3 receptions, 57 yards
- GASO – Derwin Burgess Jr. – 8 receptions, 124 yards

Top defenders

- WIS – Hunter Wohler – 10 tackles, 1 sack, 1 TFL, 2 INT
- GASO – Marques Watson-Trent – 8 tackles

=== at Purdue ===
Wisconsin vs. Purdue – Game summary

| Quarter | 1 | 2 | 3 | 4 | Total |
|---|---|---|---|---|---|
| Badgers | 14 | 7 | 6 | 11 | 38 |
| Boilermakers | 3 | 0 | 14 | 0 | 17 |

at Ross-Ade Stadium, West Lafayette, Indiana

- Date: September 22, 2023
- Game time: 6:00 p.m.
- Game weather: 79 °F (26 °C); Cloudy; Wind at SE4 MPH
- Game attendance: 55,529
- Referee: Jeffrey Servinski
- TV announcers (FS1): Tim Brando (play-by-play) and Spencer Tillman (analyst)

Game information

First quarter

- WIS – Tanner Mordecai 14-yard run (Nathanial Vakos kick), 10:05 Wisconsin 7–0 Drive: 8 plays, 62 yards, 3:25.
- WIS – Tanner Mordecai 6-yard run (Nathanial Vakos kick), 3:26 Wisconsin 14–0 Drive: 7 plays, 38 yards, 2:44.
- PUR – Julio Macias 34-yard field goal, 0:17. Wisconsin 14–3. Drive: 8 plays, 58 yards, 3:09.

Second quarter

- WIS – Braelon Allen 14-yard run (Nathanial Vakos kick), 6:36 Wisconsin 21–3 Drive: 16 plays, 75 yards, 8:41.

Third quarter

- WIS – Nathanial Vakos 38-yard field goal, 11:44. Wisconsin 24–3. Drive: 7 plays, 46 yards, 3:07.
- PUR – Tyrone Tracy Jr. 19-yard run (Julio Macias kick), 8:42 Wisconsin 24–10 Drive: 8 plays, 75 yards, 3:02.
- WIS – Nathanial Vakos 22-yard field goal, 3:54. Wisconsin 27–10. Drive: 11 plays, 71 yards, 4:48.
- PUR – Hudson Card 6-yard run (Julio Macias kick), 0:00 Wisconsin 27–17 Drive: 9 plays, 75 yards, 3:54.

Fourth quarter

- WIS – Nathanial Vakos 48-yard field goal, 12:52. Wisconsin 30–17. Drive: 5 plays, 16 yards, 2:01.
- WIS – Braelon Allen 4-yard run (Tanner Mordecai pass), 3:35 Wisconsin 38–17 Drive: 3 plays, 26 yards, 1:27.

Top passers

- WIS – Tanner Mordecai – 17/27, 174 yards, 1 INT
- PUR – Hudson Card – 21/38, 202 yards, 2 INT

Top rushers

- WIS – Braelon Allen – 16 rushes, 116 yards, 2 TD
- PUR – Tyrone Tracy Jr. – 8 rushes, 84 yards, 1 TD

Top receivers

- WIS – Chimere Dike – 3 receptions, 67 yards
- PUR – Deion Burks – 6 receptions, 73 yards

Top defenders

- WIS – James Thompson Jr. – 6 tackles, 1 sack, 2 TFL, 1 PD
- PUR – Sanoussi Kane – 9 tackles, 2 TFL, 1 PD

=== Rutgers ===
Rutgers vs. Wisconsin – Game summary

| Quarter | 1 | 2 | 3 | 4 | Total |
|---|---|---|---|---|---|
| Scarlet Knights | 0 | 0 | 6 | 7 | 13 |
| Badgers | 3 | 14 | 0 | 7 | 24 |

at Camp Randall Stadium, Madison, Wisconsin

- Date: October 7, 2023
- Game time: 11:00 a.m.
- Game weather: 49 °F (9 °C); Sunny; Wind at NW13 MPH
- Game attendance: 74,885
- Referee: Ron Snodgrass
- TV announcers (Peacock): Brendan Burke (play-by-play), Kyle Rudolph (analyst) and Lewis Johnson (sideline)

Game information

First quarter

- WIS – Nathanial Vakos 39-yard field goal, 11:44. Wisconsin 3–0. Drive: 11 plays, 54 yards, 3:16.

Second quarter

- WIS – Braelon Allen 18-yard run (Nathanial Vakos kick), 4:28 Wisconsin 10–0 Drive: 6 plays, 39 yards, 2:29.
- WIS – Ricardo Hallman 95-yard interception (Nathanial Vakos kick), 0:04 Wisconsin 17–0

Third quarter

- RUT – Aaron Young 10-yard pass from Evan Simon (Jai Patel missed kick), 1:26. Wisconsin 17–6 Drive: 10 plays, 57 yards, 5:02.

Fourth quarter

- WIS – Tucker Ashcraft 3-yard pass from Tanner Mordecai (Nathanial Vakos kick), 10:51. Wisconsin 24–6 Drive: 15 plays, 72 yards, 5:35.
- RUT – Ian Strong 11-yard pass from Gavin Wimsatt (Jai Patel kick), 4:07. Wisconsin 24–13 Drive: 3 plays, 21 yards, 0:35.

Top passers

- WIS – Tanner Mordecai – 17/31, 145 yards, 1 TD
- RUT – Gavin Wimsatt – 16/35, 181 yards, 1 TD, 1 INT

Top rushers

- WIS – Braelon Allen – 21 rushes, 101 yards, 1 TD
- RUT – Gavin Wimsatt – 9 rushes, 43 yards

Top receivers

- WIS – Will Pauling – 8 receptions, 68 yards
- RUT – Isaiah Washington – 3 receptions, 53 yards

Top defenders

- WIS – C.J. Goetz – 3 tackles, 1 sack, 1 TFL
- RUT – Wesley Bailey – 4 tackles, 2 sack, 2 TFL

=== Iowa ===
Iowa vs. Wisconsin – Game summary

| Quarter | 1 | 2 | 3 | 4 | Total |
|---|---|---|---|---|---|
| Hawkeyes | 0 | 7 | 0 | 8 | 15 |
| Badgers | 0 | 0 | 6 | 0 | 6 |

at Camp Randall Stadium, Madison, Wisconsin

- Date: October 14, 2023
- Game time: 3:00 p.m.
- Game weather: 54 °F (12 °C); Cloudy; Wind at N17 MPH
- Game attendance: 76,205
- Referee: Chris Coyte
- TV announcers (FOX): Jason Benetti (play-by-play), Brock Huard (analyst), and Allison Williams (sidelines)

Game information

First quarter

No scoring

Second quarter

- IOWA – Leshon Williams 82-yard run (Drew Stevens kick), 11:49 Iowa 7–0 Drive: 3 plays, 90 yards, 1:20.

Third quarter

- WIS – Nathanial Vakos 36-yard field goal, 9:55. Iowa 7–3. Drive: 13 plays, 60 yards, 5:01.
- WIS – Nathanial Vakos 52-yard field goal, 3:58. Iowa 7–6. Drive: 10 plays, 60 yards, 4:55.

Fourth quarter

- IOWA – Drew Stevens 48-yard field goal, 13:08. Iowa 10–6. Drive: 6 plays, 28 yards, 2:44.
- IOWA – Braedyn Locke sacked for a safety, 12:55. Iowa 12–6.
- IOWA – Drew Stevens 40-yard field goal, 1:55. Iowa 15–6. Drive: 5 plays, 17 yards, 1:06.

Top passers

- WIS – Braedyn Locke – 15/30, 122 yards, 1 INT
- IOWA – Deacon Hill – 6/14, 37 yards

Top rushers

- WIS – Braelon Allen – 18 rushes, 87 yards
- IOWA – Leshon Williams – 25 rushes, 174 yards, 1 TD

Top receivers

- WIS – Bryson Green – 5 receptions, 86 yards
- IOWA – Erick All – 2 receptions, 19 yards

Top defenders

- WIS – Alexander Smith – 4 tackles, 1 sack, 1.5 TFL
- IOWA – Sebastian Castro – 7 tackles, 2 TFL, 1 PD

=== at Illinois ===
Wisconsin vs. Illinois – Game summary

| Quarter | 1 | 2 | 3 | 4 | Total |
|---|---|---|---|---|---|
| Badgers | 0 | 7 | 0 | 18 | 25 |
| Fighting Illini | 7 | 7 | 7 | 0 | 21 |

at Memorial Stadium, Champaign, Illinois

- Date: October 21, 2023
- Game time: 2:30 p.m.
- Game weather: 69 °F (21 °C); Sunny; Wind at NW21 MPH
- Game attendance: 54,205
- Referee: Kole Knueppel
- TV announcers (FS1): Eric Collins (play-by-play) and Devin Gardner (analyst)

Game information

First quarter

- ILL – Tanner Arkin 1-yard pass from Luke Altmyer (Caleb Griffin kick), 6:07. Illinois 7–0 Drive: 6 plays, 54 yards, 2:39.

Second quarter

- ILL – Tip Reiman 3-yard pass from Luke Altmyer (Caleb Griffin kick), 2:12. Illinois 14–0 Drive: 12 plays, 82 yards, 7:53.
- WIS – Braelon Allen 4-yard run (Nathanial Vakos kick), 0:31 Illinois 14–7 Drive: 8 plays, 73 yards, 1:37.

Third quarter

- ILL – Kaden Feagin 12-yard run (Caleb Griffin kick), 4:30 Illinois 21–7 Drive: 10 plays, 53 yards, 4:57.

Fourth quarter

- WIS – Nathanial Vakos 41-yard field goal, 14:13. Illinois 21–10. Drive: 12 plays, 52 yards, 5:17.
- WIS – Will Pauling 20-yard pass from Braedyn Locke (Riley Nowakowski pass), 7:21. Illinois 21–18 Drive: 10 plays, 82 yards, 3:25.
- WIS – Nolan Rucci 3-yard pass from Braedyn Locke (Nathanial Vakos kick), 0:27. Wisconsin 25–21 Drive: 14 plays, 83 yards, 2:57.

Top passers

- WIS – Braedyn Locke – 21/41, 240 yards, 2 TD
- ILL – Luke Altmyer – 13/21, 100 yards, 2 TD

Top rushers

- WIS – Braelon Allen – 29 rushes, 145 yards, 1 TD
- ILL – Luke Altmyer – 16 rushes, 100 yards

Top receivers

- WIS – Will Pauling – 7 receptions, 95 yards, 1 TD
- ILL – Casey Washington – 4 receptions, 34 yards

Top defenders

- WIS – Maema Njongmeta – 12 tackles, 1 sack, 2 TFL
- ILL – Johnny Newton – 6 tackles, 1 sack, 1 TFL

=== No. 3 Ohio State ===
No. 3 Ohio State vs. Wisconsin – Game summary

| Quarter | 1 | 2 | 3 | 4 | Total |
|---|---|---|---|---|---|
| No. 3 Buckeyes | 3 | 7 | 7 | 7 | 24 |
| Badgers | 0 | 3 | 7 | 0 | 10 |

at Camp Randall Stadium, Madison, Wisconsin

- Date: October 28, 2023
- Game time: 6:30 p.m.
- Game weather: 40 °F (4 °C) • Wind: S at 8 miles per hour (13 km/h) • Weather: Cloudy
- Game attendance: 76,453
- Referee: Larry Smith
- TV announcers (NBC): Noah Eagle (play-by-play), Todd Blackledge (analyst), and Kathryn Tappen (sideline reporter)

Game information

First quarter

- OSU – Jayden Fielding 27-yard field goal, 8:09. Ohio State 3–0. Drive: 7 plays, 47 yards, 2:53.

Second quarter

- OSU – Marvin Harrison Jr. 16-yard pass from Kyle McCord (Jayden Fielding kick), 10:36. Ohio State 10–0 Drive: 7 plays, 52 yards, 2:57.
- WIS – Nathanial Vakos 19-yard field goal, 0:00. Ohio State 10–3. Drive: 12 plays, 51 yards, 5:09.

Third quarter

- WIS – Will Pauling 13-yard pass from Braedyn Locke (Nathanial Vakos kick), 12:30. Tied 10–10 Drive: 7 plays, 75 yards, 2:30.
- OSU – Marvin Harrison Jr. 19-yard pass from Kyle McCord (Jayden Fielding kick), 7:14. Ohio State 17–10 Drive: 9 plays, 75 yards, 5:16.

Fourth quarter

- OSU – TreVeyon Henderson 33-yard run (Jayden Fielding kick), 5:15 Ohio State 24–10 Drive: 3 plays, 45 yards, 1:30.

Top passers

- WIS – Braedyn Locke – 18/39, 165 yards, 1 TD
- OSU – Kyle McCord – 17/26, 226 yards, 2 TD, 2 INT

Top rushers

- WIS – Braelon Allen – 10 rushes, 50 yards
- OSU – TreVeyon Henderson – 24 rushes, 162 yards, 1 TD

Top receivers

- WIS – Will Pauling – 4 receptions, 51 yards, 1 TD
- OSU – Marvin Harrison Jr. – 6 receptions, 123 yards, 2 TD

Top defenders

- WIS – Maema Njongmeta – 10 tackles, 1 sack, 2.5 TFL
- OSU – Tyleik Williams – 4 tackles, 1 sack, 2 TFL, 1 PD

=== at Indiana ===
Wisconsin vs. Indiana – Game summary

| Quarter | 1 | 2 | 3 | 4 | Total |
|---|---|---|---|---|---|
| Badgers | 0 | 7 | 7 | 0 | 14 |
| Hoosiers | 7 | 10 | 0 | 3 | 20 |

at Memorial Stadium, Bloomington, Indiana

- Date: November 4, 2023
- Game time: 11:00 a.m.
- Game weather: 61 °F (16 °C) • Wind: SW at 10 miles per hour (16 km/h) • Weather: Sunny
- Game attendance: 45,466
- Referee: Mark Kluczynski
- TV announcers (BTN): Cory Provus (play-by-play), Jake Butt (analyst), and Brooke Fletcher (sideline reporter)

Game information

First quarter

- IU – Brendan Sorsby 8-yard run (Chris Freeman kick), 9:59 Indiana 7–0 Drive: 9 plays, 66 yards, 4:53.

Second quarter

- IU – Chris Freeman 27-yard field goal, 8:08. Indiana 10–0. Drive: 9 plays, 33 yards, 3:12.
- WIS – Bryson Green 54-yard pass from Braedyn Locke (Nathanial Vakos kick), 4:11. Indiana 10–7 Drive: 5 plays, 68 yards, 1:50.
- IU – Donaven McCulley 7-yard pass from Brendan Sorsby (Chris Freeman kick), 0:41. Indiana 17–7 Drive: 9 plays, 71 yards, 3:24.

Third quarter

- WIS – Will Pauling 18-yard pass from Braedyn Locke (Nathanial Vakos kick), 10:14. Indiana 17–14 Drive: 10 plays, 75 yards, 4:46.

Fourth quarter

- IU – Chris Freeman 50-yard field goal, 1:10. Indiana 20–14. Drive: 8 plays, 36 yards, 2:57.

Top passers

- WIS – Braedyn Locke – 21/41, 243 yards, 2 TD
- IU – Brendan Sorsby – 19/31, 186 yards, 1 TD

Top rushers

- WIS – Cade Yacamelli – 10 rushes, 48 yards
- IU – Josh Henderson – 15 rushes, 40 yards

Top receivers

- WIS – Bryson Green – 4 receptions, 96 yards, 1 TD
- IU – Donaven McCulley – 5 receptions, 67 yards, 1 TD

Top defenders

- WIS – Jordan Turner – 8 tackles, 1 sack, 3.0 TFL, QB hurry
- IU – Aaron Casey – 9 tackles, 2 sacks, 4.0 TFL, forced fumble

=== Northwestern ===
Northwestern vs. Wisconsin – Game summary

| Quarter | 1 | 2 | 3 | 4 | Total |
|---|---|---|---|---|---|
| Wildcats | 7 | 17 | 0 | 0 | 24 |
| Badgers | 3 | 0 | 0 | 7 | 10 |

at Camp Randall Stadium, Madison, Wisconsin

- Date: November 11, 2023
- Game time: 2:30 p.m.
- Game weather: 45 °F (7 °C) • Wind: S at 8 miles per hour (13 km/h) • Weather: Cloudy
- Game attendance: 76,124
- Referee: Larry Smith
- TV announcers (FS1): Chris Myers (play-by-play), Robert Smith (analyst)

Game information

First quarter

- WIS – Nathanial Vakos 33-yard field goal, 10:25. Wisconsin 3–0. Drive: 10 plays, 57 yards, 4:30.
- NU – A.J. Henning 23-yard pass from Ben Bryant (Jack Olsen kick), 4:12. Northwestern 7–3 Drive: 12 plays, 79 yards, 6:08.

Second quarter

- NU – Ben Bryant 1-yard run (Jack Olsen kick), 12:54 Northwestern 14–3 Drive: 11 plays, 68 yards, 5:08.
- NU – Camron Johnson 24-yard pass from Ben Bryant (Jack Olsen kick), 6:41. Northwestern 21–3 Drive: 9 plays, 90 yards, 3:32.
- NU – Jack Olsen 28-yard field goal, 1:06. Northwestern 24–3. Drive: 11 plays, 68 yards, 4:23.

Third quarter

No scoring

Fourth quarter

- WIS – Jackson Acker 3-yard run (Nathanial Vakos kick), 00:11 Northwestern 24–10 Drive: 13 plays, 70 yards, 3:27.

Top passers

- WIS – Tanner Mordecai – 31/45, 255 yards
- NU – Ben Bryant – 18/26, 195 yards, 2 TD

Top rushers

- WIS – Cade Yacamelli – 9 rushes, 47 yards
- NU – Cam Porter – 18 rushes, 72 yards

Top receivers

- WIS – Will Pauling – 10 receptions, 96 yards
- NU – A.J. Henning – 3 receptions, 70 yards, 1 TD

Top defenders

- WIS – Hunter Wohler – 10 tackles, 1.0 TFL
- NU – Devin Turner – 10 tackles

=== Nebraska ===
Nebraska vs. Wisconsin – Game summary

| Quarter | 1 | 2 | 3 | 4 | OT | Total |
|---|---|---|---|---|---|---|
| Cornhuskers | 14 | 0 | 0 | 3 | 0 | 17 |
| Badgers | 0 | 10 | 7 | 0 | 7 | 24 |

at Camp Randall Stadium, Madison, Wisconsin

- Date: November 18, 2023
- Game time: 6:30 p.m.
- Game weather: 44 °F (7 °C) • Wind: W at 6 miles per hour (9.7 km/h) • Weather: Clear
- Game attendance: 72,237
- Referee: Chris Coyte
- TV announcers (NBC): Noah Eagle (play-by-play), Todd Blackledge (analyst) and Kathryn Tappen (sideline reporter)

Game information

First quarter

- NEB – Chubba Purdy 55-yard run (Tristan Alvano kick), 11:33 Nebraska 7–0 Drive: 6 plays, 75 yards, 3:27.
- NEB – Jaylen Lloyd 58-yard pass from Chubba Purdy (Tristan Alvano kick), 6:00. Nebraska 14–0 Drive: 6 plays, 76 yards, 3:35.

Second quarter

- WIS – Jackson Acker 26-yard pass from Tanner Mordecai (Nathanial Vakos kick), 6:37. Nebraska 14–7 Drive: 9 plays, 66 yards, 3:47.
- WIS – Nathanial Vakos 33-yard field goal, 1:54. Nebraska 14–10. Drive: 6 plays, 35 yards, 2:00.

Third quarter

- WIS – Braelon Allen 2-yard run (Nathanial Vakos kick), 7:47 Wisconsin 17–14 Drive: 10 plays, 79 yards, 4:31.

Fourth quarter

- NEB – Tristan Alvano 30-yard field goal, 0:04. Tie 17–17. Drive: 9 plays, 68 yards, 3:33.

Overtime

- WIS – Braelon Allen 3-yard run (Nathanial Vakos kick), 0:00 Wisconsin 24–17 Drive: 8 plays, 25 yards, 0:00.

Top passers

- WIS – Tanner Mordecai – 18/28, 160 yards, 1 TD
- NEB – Chubba Purdy – 15/23, 169 yards, 1 TD, 1 INT

Top rushers

- WIS – Braelon Allen – 22 rushes, 62 yards, 2 TD
- NEB – Chubba Purdy – 14 rushes, 105 yards, 1 TD

Top receivers

- WIS – Will Pauling – 8 receptions, 79 yards
- NEB – Billy Kemp – 8 receptions, 43 yards

Top defenders

- WIS – Jordan Turner – 9 tackles, 1.0 sack, 1.5 TFL
- NEB – Marques Buford Jr. – 10 tackles, 1.5 TFL

=== at Minnesota ===
Wisconsin vs. Minnesota – Game summary

| Quarter | 1 | 2 | 3 | 4 | Total |
|---|---|---|---|---|---|
| Badgers | 0 | 14 | 14 | 0 | 28 |
| Golden Gophers | 7 | 7 | 0 | 0 | 14 |

at Huntington Bank Stadium, Minneapolis, Minnesota

- Date: November 25, 2023
- Game time: 2:30 p.m.
- Game weather: 31 °F (−1 °C) • Wind: SW at 9 miles per hour (14 km/h) • Weather: Cloudy/Light snow
- Game attendance: 48,119
- Referee: Larry Smith
- TV announcers (FS1): Jeff Levering (play-by-play) and Mark Helfrich (analyst)

Game information

First quarter

- MINN – Jordan Nubin 1-yard run (Dragan Kesich kick), 12:21 Minnesota 7–0 Drive: 6 plays, 72 yards, 2:34.

Second quarter

- WIS – Braelon Allen 5-yard run (Nathanial Vakos kick), 13:04 Tie 7–7 Drive: 11 plays, 86 yards, 5:16.
- MINN – Daniel Jackson 7-yard pass from Athan Kaliakmanis (Dragan Kesich kick), 4:30. Minnesota 14–7 Drive: 11 plays, 71 yards, 5:36.
- WIS – Will Pauling 11-yard pass from Tanner Mordecai (Nathanial Vakos kick), 2:38. Tie 14–14 Drive: 4 plays, 75 yards, 1:52.

Third quarter

- WIS – Braelon Allen 4-yard run (Nathanial Vakos kick), 9:24 Wisconsin 21–14 Drive: 2 plays, 54 yards, 0:25.
- WIS – Riley Nowakowski 5-yard pass from Tanner Mordecai (Nathanial Vakos kick), 0:10. Wisconsin 28–14 Drive: 10 plays, 86 yards, 4:55.

Fourth quarter

No scoring

Top passers

- WIS – Tanner Mordecai – 14/22, 145 yards, 2 TD, 1 INT
- MINN – Athan Kaliakmanis – 16/28, 167 yards, 1 TD, 1 INT

Top rushers

- WIS – Braelon Allen – 26 rushes, 165 yards, 2 TD
- MINN – Jordan Nubin – 24 rushes, 93 yards, 1 TD

Top receivers

- WIS – Chimere Dike – 2 receptions, 46 yards
- MINN – Daniel Jackson – 9 receptions, 121 yards, 1 TD

Top defenders

- WIS – Hunter Wohler – 12 tackles, QB hurry
- MINN – Cody Lindenberg – 11 tackles, 1.0 TFL

=== vs No. 13 LSU (ReliaQuest Bowl) ===
2024 ReliaQuest Bowl (January)

| Quarter | 1 | 2 | 3 | 4 | Total |
|---|---|---|---|---|---|
| Wisconsin | 14 | 7 | 10 | 0 | 31 |
| No. 13 LSU | 0 | 14 | 14 | 7 | 35 |

at Raymond James Stadium, Tampa, Florida

- Date: January 1, 2024
- Game time: 11:00 a.m.
- Game weather: 65 °F (18 °C) • Wind: N at 2 miles per hour (3.2 km/h) • Weather: Cloudy
- Game attendance: 31,424
- Referee: Mark Duddy
- TV announcers (ESPN2): Brian Custer (play-by-play), Rod Gilmore (analyst) and Lauren Sisler (sideline reporter)

Game information

First quarter

- WIS – Bryson Green 20-yard pass from Tanner Mordecai (Nathanial Vakos kick), 8:28. Wisconsin 7–0 Drive: 8 plays, 78 yards, 2:15.
- WIS – Will Pauling 53-yard pass from Tanner Mordecai (Nathanial Vakos kick), 0:23. Wisconsin 14–0 Drive: 2 plays, 60 yards, 0:28.

Second quarter

- LSU – Harold Perkins 1-yard run (Nathan Dibert kick), 6:00 Wisconsin 14–7 Drive: 8 plays, 60 yards, 3:11.
- LSU – Kaleb Jackson 12-yard run (Nathan Dibert kick), 1:28 Tie 14–14 Drive: 7 plays, 67 yards, 2:28.
- WIS – Will Pauling 9-yard pass from Tanner Mordecai (Nathanial Vakos kick), 0:47. Wisconsin 21–14 Drive: 5 plays, 75 yards, 0:41.

Third quarter

- WIS – Jackson Acker 33-yard run (Nathanial Vakos kick), 12:14 Wisconsin 28–14 Drive: 8 plays, 75 yards, 2:46.
- LSU – Brian Thomas Jr. 38-yard pass from Garrett Nussmeier (Nathan Dibert kick), 10:33. Wisconsin 28–21 Drive: 5 plays, 75 yards, 1:36.
- LSU – Chris Hilton Jr. 14-yard pass from Garrett Nussmeier (Nathan Dibert kick), 4:44. Tie 28–28 Drive: 8 plays, 70 yards, 3:10.
- WIS – Nathanial Vakos 21-yard field goal, 1:18. Wisconsin 31–28. Drive: 6 plays, 42 yards, 3:19.

Fourth quarter

- LSU – Brian Thomas Jr. 4-yard pass from Garrett Nussmeier (Nathan Dibert kick), 3:08. LSU 35–31 Drive: 8 plays, 98 yards, 3:02.

Top passers

- WIS – Tanner Mordecai – 27/40, 378 yards, 3 TD
- LSU – Garrett Nussmeier – 31/45, 395 yards, 3 TD, 1 INT

Top rushers

- WIS – Jackson Acker – 14 rushes, 86 yards, 1 TD
- LSU – Josh Williams – 12 rushes, 51 yards

Top receivers

- WIS – Will Pauling – 8 receptions, 143 yards, 2 TD
- LSU – Brian Thomas Jr. – 8 receptions, 98 yards, 2 TD

Top defenders

- WIS – Hunter Wohler – 7 tackles, 1.0 TFL, 2 PBU
- LSU – Major Burns – 13 tackles, 1.5 TFL

== Awards and honors ==
Weekly Awards
| Player | Award | Date awarded | Ref. |
|---|---|---|---|
| Braedyn Locke | Big Ten Freshman Player of the Week | October 23, 2023 | |

Individual Awards
| Player | Award | Ref. |
|---|---|---|
| Braelon Allen | Second Team All-Big Ten Offense (Media)/Third Team All-Big Ten Offense (Coaches) | |
| Hunter Wohler | Second Team All-Big Ten Defense (Media)/Third Team All-Big Ten Defense (Coaches) | |
| Ricardo Hallman | Third Team All-Big Ten Defense (Media)/Honorable Mention Defense (Coaches) | |
| Tanor Bortolini | Third Team All-Big Ten Offense (Media)/Honorable Mention Offense (Coaches) | |
| Will Pauling | Third Team All-Big Ten Offense (Coaches)/Honorable Mention Offense (Media) | |
| Nathanial Vakos | Honorable Mention Special Teams (Media) | |

== 2024 NFL draft ==
| Round | Pick | Player | Position | NFL Club |
|---|---|---|---|---|
| 4 | 117 | Tanor Bortolini | C | Indianapolis Colts |
| 4 | 134 | Braelon Allen | RB | New York Jets |
