= 2023 LSU Tigers football team =

American college football season

2023 LSU Tigers football

ReliaQuest Bowl champion

ReliaQuest Bowl, W 35–31 vs. Wisconsin
- Conference: Southeastern Conference
- Western Division

Ranking
- Coaches: No. 12
- AP: No. 12
- Record: 10–3 (6–2 SEC)
- Head coach: Brian Kelly (2nd season)
- Offensive coordinator: Mike Denbrock (2nd season)
- Offensive scheme: Multiple
- Defensive coordinator: Matt House (2nd season)
- Base defense: 4–3
- Captains: Greg Brooks Jr.; Will Campbell; Jayden Daniels; Mekhi Wingo
- Home stadium: Tiger Stadium

2023 Southeastern Conference football standings
	Conf.			Overall
Team	W		L	W		L
Eastern Division
No. 4 Georgia xy	8	–	0	13	–	1
No. 8 Missouri	6	–	2	11	–	2
No. 17 Tennessee	4	–	4	9	–	4
Kentucky	3	–	5	7	–	6
Florida	3	–	5	5	–	7
South Carolina	3	–	5	5	–	7
Vanderbilt	0	–	8	2	–	10
Western Division
No. 5 Alabama xy$^	8	–	0	12	–	2
No. 9 Ole Miss	6	–	2	11	–	2
No. 12 LSU	6	–	2	10	–	3
Texas A&M	4	–	4	7	–	6
Auburn	3	–	5	6	–	7
Mississippi State	1	–	7	5	–	7
Arkansas	1	–	7	4	–	8
Championship: Alabama 27, Georgia 24
^ – College Football Playoff participant; $ – Conference champion; x – Division champion/co-champions; y – Championship game participant; Rankings from AP Poll

The 2023 LSU Tigers football team represented Louisiana State University (LSU) in the Western Division of the Southeastern Conference (SEC) during the 2023 NCAA Division I FBS football season. The Tigers were led by Brian Kelly in his second year as LSU's head coach. Quarterback Jayden Daniels won the Heisman Trophy and several other awards for the season after scoring 50 total touchdowns, leading the NCAA with nearly 5,000 total yards, and setting the FBS single-season passer rating record.

LSU's football team played its home games at Tiger Stadium in Baton Rouge, Louisiana. This was the final year for the West division, as Texas and Oklahoma joined the SEC in 2024.

== Schedule ==
Date	Time	Opponent	Rank	Site	TV	Result	Attendance
September 3, 2023	6:30 p.m.	vs. No. 8 Florida State*	No. 5	Camping World Stadium; Orlando, FL (Camping World Kickoff)	ABC	L 24–45	65,429
September 9	6:30 p.m.	Grambling State*	No. 14	Tiger Stadium; Baton Rouge, LA	SECN+, ESPN+	W 72–10	97,735
September 16	11:00 a.m.	at Mississippi State	No. 14	Davis Wade Stadium; Starkville, MS (rivalry, SEC Nation)	ESPN	W 41–14	60,084
September 23	6:00 p.m.	Arkansas	No. 12	Tiger Stadium; Baton Rouge, LA (rivalry)	ESPN	W 34–31	99,648
September 30	5:00 p.m.	at No. 20 Ole Miss	No. 13	Vaught–Hemingway Stadium; Oxford, MS (Magnolia Bowl)	ESPN	L 49–55	66,703
October 7	11:00 a.m.	at No. 21 Missouri	No. 23	Faurot Field; Columbia, MO	ESPN	W 49–39	62,621
October 14	6:00 p.m.	Auburn	No. 22	Tiger Stadium; Baton Rouge, LA (rivalry)	ESPN	W 48–18	102,321
October 21	6:30 p.m.	Army*	No. 19	Tiger Stadium; Baton Rouge, LA	SECN	W 62–0	101,776
November 4	6:45 p.m.	at No. 8 Alabama	No. 14	Bryant–Denny Stadium; Tuscaloosa, AL (rivalry, College GameDay)	CBS	L 28–42	100,077
November 11	6:30 p.m.	Florida	No. 19	Tiger Stadium; Baton Rouge, LA (rivalry)	SECN	W 52–35	102,321
November 18	7:00 p.m.	Georgia State*	No. 15	Tiger Stadium; Baton Rouge, LA	ESPN2	W 56–14	100,212
November 25	11:00 a.m.	Texas A&M	No. 14	Tiger Stadium; Baton Rouge, LA (rivalry)	ESPN	W 42–30	101,178
January 1, 2024	11:00 a.m.	vs. Wisconsin*	No. 13	Raymond James Stadium; Tampa, FL (ReliaQuest Bowl)	ESPN2	W 35–31	31,424
*Non-conference game; Rankings from AP Poll (and CFP Rankings, after October 31) – Released prior to game; All times are in Central time

== Personnel ==
=== Roster ===
2023 LSU Tigers football team roster
Players
Coaches
Offense

Pos.	#	Name	Class
WR	1	Aaron Anderson	Fr
WR	2	Kyren Lacy	Sr
RB	3	Logan Diggs	Jr
RB	4	John Emery Jr.	GS
QB	5	Jayden Daniels (C)	Sr
WR	6	Shelton Sampson Jr.	Fr
WR	8	Malik Nabers	Jr
QB	10	Rickie Collins	Fr
WR	11	Brian Thomas Jr.	Jr
WR	12	Kyle Parker	Fr
QB	13	Garrett Nussmeier	So
WR	14	Jalen Brown	Fr
QB	15	Matt O'Dowd	So
QB	16	George Hamsley	Fr
WR	17	Chris Hilton Jr.	So
RB	21	Noah Cain	Sr
RB	22	Armoni Goodwin	Jr
WR	24	Landon Ibieta	Fr
RB	25	Trey Holly	Fr
WR	26	Cowinn Helaire	Fr
RB	27	Josh Williams	GS
RB	28	Kaleb Jackson	Fr
RB	30	Malachi Lane	So
RB	32	Tre Bradford	So
WR	33	Javen Nicholas	Fr
WR	37	RJ Willis	So
TE	45	GiVanni Peterson	So
OL	50	Emery Jones Jr.	So
OL	52	Kobe Roberts	Jr
OL	53	Lance Heard	Fr
OL	55	Kimo Makane'ole	So
OL	65	Paul Mubenga	Fr
OL	66	Will Campbell (C)	So
OL	67	Bo Bordelon	Fr
OL	69	Charles Turner III	GS
OL	70	Miles Frazier	Jr
OL	71	Tyree Adams	Fr
OL	72	Garrett Dellinger	Jr
OL	73	Jack McDevitt	Fr
OL	75	Braden Augustus	Fr
OL	76	Christian Stamps	Fr
OL	77	Marlon Martinez	Sr
OL	78	Mason Lunsford	Jr
OL	79	DJ Chester	Fr
WR	80	Gregory Clayton Jr.	Sr
WR	82	Khai Prean	Fr
TE	83	Jackson McGohan	Fr
TE	84	Mac Markway	Fr
TE	85	Gabe Leonards	So
TE	86	Mason Taylor	So
WR	87	Noah Nash	So
TE	88	Ka'Morreun Pimpton	Fr
TE	89	Connor Gilbreath	So

Defense

Pos.	#	Name	Class
DT	0	Maason Smith	So
LB	1	Omar Speights	Sr
DE	2	Ovie Oghoufo	Sr
S	3	Greg Brooks Jr. (C)	GS
LB	4	Harold Perkins Jr.	So
CB	5	Laterrance Welch	So
S	6	Jordan Allen	Fr
S	8	Major Burns	Jr
CB	10	Denver Harris	So
LB	11	Jaxon Howard	Fr
CB	12	JK Johnson	So
DE	13	Bradyn Swinson	Jr
S	14	Andre' Sam	Sr
S	15	Sage Ryan	So
S	16	Quad Wilson	Jr
DE	17	Da'Shawn Womack	Fr
DT	18	Mekhi Wingo (C)	Jr
S	19	Matthew Langlois	So
S	21	Ryan Yaites	Fr
CB	22	Duce Chestnut	Jr
S	23	Kylin Jackson	Fr
CB	24	Zy Alexander	Jr
S	25	Javien Toviano	Fr
CB	26	Ashton Stamps	Fr
CB	29	Jeremiah Hughes	Fr
LB	30	Greg Penn III	Jr
CB	31	Everett Garard	So
LB	32	Seth Marcione	Fr
LB	33	West Weeks	Jr
CB	34	Ryan Robinson Jr.	Fr
DE	35	Sai'vion Jones	Jr
CB	38	Darian Blount	Fr
S	39	Tyson Short	Fr
LB	40	Whit Weeks	Fr
S	41	Welton Spottsville	Jr
DE	42	Lane Blue	So
LB	43	Matt Jayne	Jr
LB	44	Christian Brathwaite	Fr
LB	46	Shelby Lee Jr.	Jr
S	47	Aristotle Abraham II	So
LB	48	Sloan Wright	Jr
LB	52	Princeton Malbrue	So
LB	54	Martin Lunsford	Fr
DE	55	Jake Ibieta	Fr
DT	68	Fitzgerald West Jr.	Fr
DT	81	Bryce Langston	So
DT	90	Jacobian Guillory	Jr
DE	91	JC Kwasny	Fr
DE	93	Quency Wiggins	Fr
DE	94	Paris Shand	Jr
DT	95	Tygee Hill	Fr
DT	96	Jalen Lee	Jr
DE	97	Dylan Carpenter	Fr
DT	98	Preston Hickey	Fr
DT	99	Jordan Jefferson	Sr

Special teams

Pos.	#	Name	Class
P	19	Jay Bramblett	GS
K	31	Nathan Dibert	So
K	34	Damian Ramos	So
K	36	Aidan Corbello	Fr
P	38	Peyton Todd	So
LS	44	Slade Roy	Jr
LS	45	Jake Davis	Fr
P	46	Badger Hargett	Fr
LS	49	Jonathan Ferguson	So

Head coach

- Brian Kelly

Coordinators/assistant coaches

- Matt House – Defensive coordinator/linebackers
- Mike Denbrock – Offensive coordinator/tight ends
- Frank Wilson – Associate head coach/running backs
- Brad Davis – Offensive line
- Joe Sloan – Quarterbacks
- Jimmy Lindsey – Defensive line
- Kerry Cooks – Safeties
- Robert Steeples – Cornerbacks
- Cortez Hankton – Passing game coordinator/wide receivers
- John Jancek – Defensive line
- Bob Diaco – Special teams coordinator/outside linebackers
- Jake Flint – Director of athletic development

Legend

- (C) Team captain
- (S) Suspended
- (I) Ineligible
- Injured
- Redshirt

Roster
Last update: September 4, 2023

== Game summaries ==
=== at Mississippi State ===
Game Three – No. 14 LSU Tigers (1–1) at Mississippi State Bulldogs (2–0) – Game summary

Quarter	1	2	3	4	Total
No. 14 LSU	10	14	10	7	41
Mississippi State	0	7	0	7	14

at Davis Wade Stadium • Starkville, MS

- Date: Saturday, September 16, 2023
- Game time: 11:00 a.m. CST
- Game weather: Sunny, 81 °F (27 °C)
- Game attendance: 60,084
- Referee: Jason Autrey
- TV announcers (ESPN): Joe Tessitore (play-by-play), Jesse Palmer (analyst), Katie George (sideline)

Game information

First quarter

- (6:36) LSU – Damian Ramos 22-yard field goal (Drive: 14 plays, 77 yards, 7:12; LSU 3–0)
- (3:38) LSU – Malik Nabers 26-yard pass from Jayden Daniels (Damian Ramos kick) (Drive: 4 plays, 70 yards, 1:50; LSU 10–0)

Second quarter

- (14:11) LSU – Malik Nabers 33-yard pass from Jayden Daniels (Damian Ramos kick) (Drive: 8 plays, 63 yards, 3:13; LSU 17–0)
- (3:24) LSU – Josh Williams 1-yard run (Damian Ramos kick) (Drive: 6 plays, 66 yards, 2:45; LSU 24–0)
- (0:50) MSST – Lideatrick Griffin 9-yard run (Kyle Ferrie kick) (Drive: 6 plays, 72 yards, 2:34; LSU 24–7)

Third quarter

- (10:41) LSU – Damian Ramos 41-yard field goal (Drive: 11 plays, 53 yards, 4:19; LSU 27–7)
- (3:27) LSU – Jayden Daniels 5-yard run (Damian Ramos kick) (Drive: 5 plays, 62 yards, 2:31; LSU 34–7)

Fourth quarter

- (12:11) LSU – Jayden Daniels 1-yard run (Damian Ramos kick) (Drive: 12 plays, 75 yards, 5:08; LSU 41–7)
- (4:26) MSST – Antonio Harmon 4-yard pass from Mike Wright (Kyle Ferrie kick) (Drive: 10 plays, 58 yards, 4:19; LSU 41–14)

Statistics	LSU	MSST
First downs	26	10
Total yards	76–530	50–201
Rushing yards	39–163	21–94
Passing yards	367	107
Passing: Comp–Att–Int	31–37–0	12–29–0
Time of possession	38:39	21:21

Team	Category	Player	Statistics
LSU	Passing	Jayden Daniels	30/34, 361 yards, 2 TD
LSU	Rushing	Jayden Daniels	15 carries, 64 yards, 2 TD
LSU	Receiving	Malik Nabers	13 receptions, 239 yards, 2 TD
Mississippi State	Passing	Will Rogers	11/28, 103 yards
Mississippi State	Rushing	Jo'Quavious Marks	8 carries, 75 yards
Mississippi State	Receiving	Zavion Thomas	3 receptions, 52 yards

=== at No. 20 Ole Miss (rivalry) ===
Game Five – No. 13 LSU Tigers (3–1) at No. 20 Ole Miss Rebels (3–1) – Game summary

Quarter	1	2	3	4	Total
No. 13 Tigers	7	21	14	7	49
No. 20 Rebels	21	10	3	21	55

at Vaught-Hemingway Stadium • Oxford, MS

- Date: Saturday, September 30, 2023
- Game time: 5:00 p.m. CST
- Game weather: sunny • Temperature: 88 °F (31 °C)
- Game attendance: *66,703
- Referee: David Smith
- TV announcers (ESPN): Bob Wischusen (play-by-play), Robert Griffin III (analyst), Kris Budden (sideline)

Game information

First Quarter

- (10:25) Ole Miss – Quinshon Judkins 4 Yd pass from Jaxson Dart (Caden Davis Kick)
  Ole Miss 7–0; 14 plays, 75 yards, 4:35
- (4:00) Ole Miss – Ulysses Bentley IV 43 Yd Run (Caden Davis Kick)
  Ole Miss 14–0; 3 plays, 71 yards, 0:44
- (1:25) LSU – Brian Thomas Jr. 20 Yd pass from Jayden Daniels (Damian Ramos Kick)
  Ole Miss 14–7; 6 plays, 75 yards, 2:35
- (0:12) Ole Miss – Jordan Watkins 63 Yd pass from Jaxson Dart (Caden Davis Kick)
  Ole Miss 21–7; 4 plays, 75 yards, 1:13

Second Quarter

- (12:46) LSU – Logan Diggs 1 Yd Run (Damian Ramos Kick)
  Ole Miss 21–14; 6 plays, 78 yards, 2:26
- (8:10) Ole Miss – Dayton Wade 15 Yd pass from Jaxson Dart (Caden Davis Kick)
  Ole Miss 28–14; 10 plays, 78 yards, 4:36
- (4:30) LSU – Brian Thomas Jr. 11 Yd pass from Jayden Daniels (Damian Ramos Kick)
  Ole Miss 28–21; 7 plays, 75 yards, 3:40
- (1:42) Ole Miss – Caden Davis 28 Yd Field Goal
  Ole Miss 31–21; 7 plays, 65 yards, 2:48
- (4:30) LSU – Kyren Lacy 29 Yd pass from Jayden Daniels (Damian Ramos Kick)
  Ole Miss 31–28; 5 plays, 75 yards, 0:44

Third Quarter

- (11:30) LSU – Jayden Daniels 1 Yd Run (Damian Ramos Kick)
  LSU 35–31; 8 plays, 85 yards, 3:30
- (8:20) Ole Miss – Caden Davis 48 Yd Field Goal
  LSU 35–34; 9 plays, 45 yards, 3:10
- (3:41) LSU – Logan Diggs 12 Yd Run (Damian Ramos Kick)
  LSU 42–34; 9 plays, 75 yards, 4:39

Fourth Quarter

- (14:13) Ole Miss – Quinshon Judkins 11 Yd Run (Two-Point Pass Conversion Failed)
  LSU 42–40; 13 plays, 75 yards, 4:28
- (8:34) LSU – Brian Thomas Jr. 34 Yd pass from Jayden Daniels (Damian Ramos Kick)
  LSU 49–40; 4 plays, 55 yards, 1:53
- (5:06) Ole Miss – Jaxson Dart 1 Yd Run (Caden Davis Kick)
  LSU 49–47; 10 plays, 65 yards, 3:28
- (0:39) Ole Miss – Tre Harris 13 Yd pass from Jaxson Dart (Quinshon Judkins Run for Two-Point Conversion)
  Ole Miss 55–49; 8 plays, 88 yards, 1:57

*New Vaught-Hemingway Stadium Attendance Record

Statistics	LSU	Ole Miss
First downs	33	32
Total yards	637	*706
Passing yards	414	389
Rushes/yards	37/223	49/317
Penalties/yards	6/35	11/121
Turnovers	1	0
Time of possession	29:17	30:43

Team	Category	Player	Statistics
LSU	Passing	Jayden Daniels	27/36, 414 yards, 4 TD
LSU	Rushing	Logan Diggs	19 carries, 101 yards, 2 TD
LSU	Receiving	Brian Thomas Jr.	8 receptions, 124 yards, 3 TD
Ole Miss	Passing	Jaxson Dart	26/39, 389 yards, 4 TD
Ole Miss	Rushing	Quinshon Judkins	33 carries, 177 yards, 1 TD
Ole Miss	Receiving	Tre Harris	8 receptions, 153 yards, 1 TD

*The most total yards ever to be gained against an LSU football team in history

=== at No. 21 Missouri ===
Game Six – No. 23 LSU Tigers (3–2) at No. 21 Missouri Tigers (5–0) – Game summary

Quarter	1	2	3	4	Total
No. 23 LSU	7	10	10	22	49
No. 21 Missouri	15	10	7	7	39

at Faurot Field • Columbia, Missouri

- Date: Saturday, October 7, 2023
- Game time: 11:00 a.m. CST
- Game weather: –
- Game attendance: 62,621
- Referee: –
- TV announcers (ESPN): Bob Wischusen (play-by-play), Robert Griffin III (analyst), Kris Budden (sideline)

Game information

First quarter

- (9:50) MIZZ – Theo Wease Jr. 18-yard pass from Brady Cook (Brady Cook run) (Drive: 9 plays, 87 yards, 3:45; Missouri 8–0)
- (3:33) LSU – Logan Diggs 1-yard run (Damian Ramos kick) (Drive: 11 plays, 74 yards, 6:17; Missouri 8–7)
- (1:03) MIZZ – Cody Schrader 21-yard run (Harrison Mevis kick) (Drive: 6 plays, 75 yards, 2:30; Missouri 15–7)

Second quarter

- (10:47) MIZZ – Brett Norfleet 9-yard pass from Brady Cook (Harrison Mevis kick) (Drive: 6 plays, 57 yards, 3:32; Missouri 22–7)
- (5:43) LSU – Damian Ramos 48-yard field goal (Drive: 11 plays, 44 yards, 5:04; Missouri 22–10)
- (1:59) LSU – Mason Taylor 3-yard pass from Jayden Daniels (Damian Ramos kick) (Drive: 6 plays, 45 yards, 3:09; Missouri 22–17)
- (0:01) MIZZ – Harrison Mevis 50-yard field goal (Drive: 9 plays, 42 yards, 1:59; Missouri 25–17)

Third quarter

- (8:12) LSU – Damian Ramos 29-yard field goal (Drive: 8 plays, 61 yards, 3:15; Missouri 25–20)
- (6:00) LSU – Brian Thomas Jr. 42-yard pass from Jayden Daniels (Damian Ramos kick) (Drive: 2 plays, 45 yards, 0:46; LSU 27–25)
- (2:22) MIZZ – Cody Schrader 2-yard run (Harrison Mevis kick) (Drive: 6 plays, 75 yards, 3:38; Missouri 32–27)

Fourth quarter

- (7:54) LSU – Jayden Daniels 35-yard run (Jayden Daniels–Malik Nabers pass) (Drive: 7 plays, 92 yards, 3:29; LSU 35–32)
- (5:40) MIZZ – Cody Schrader 1-yard run (Harrison Mevis kick) (Drive: 5 plays, 70 yards, 2:14; Missouri 39–35)
- (2:58) LSU – Malik Nabers 29-yard pass from Jayden Daniels (Damian Ramos kick) (Drive: 5 plays, 75 yards, 2:42; LSU 42–39)
- (0:34) LSU – Major Burns 17-yard interception return (Damian Ramos kick) (LSU 49–39)

Statistics	LSU	MIZZ
First downs	25	23
Total yards	66–533	68–527
Rushing yards	43–274	21–116
Passing yards	259	411
Passing: Comp–Att–Int	15–23–0	30–47–2
Time of possession	32:26	27:34

Team	Category	Player	Statistics
LSU	Passing	Jayden Daniels	15/21, 259 yards, 3 TD
LSU	Rushing	Jayden Daniels	24 carries, 134 yards, TD
LSU	Receiving	Malik Nabers	6 receptions, 146 yards, TD
Missouri	Passing	Brady Cook	30/47, 411 yards, 2 TD, 2 INT
Missouri	Rushing	Cody Schrader	13 carries, 114 yards, 3 TD
Missouri	Receiving	Luther Burden III	11 receptions, 149 yards

=== vs Auburn (rivalry) ===
Game Seven – Auburn Tigers (3–2) at No. 22 LSU Tigers (4–2) – Game summary

Quarter	1	2	3	4	Total
Auburn	0	7	3	8	18
No. 22 LSU	17	3	14	14	48

at Tiger Stadium • Baton Rouge, Louisiana

- Date: Saturday, October 14, 2023
- Game time: 6:10 p.m. CDT
- Game weather: Sunny • Temperature: 75 °F (24 °C) • Wind: NW 9 mph
- Game attendance: 102,321
- Referee: Kyle Olson
- TV announcers (ESPN): Joe Tessitore (play-by-play), Jesse Palmer (analyst), Katie George (sideline reporter)

Game information

First quarter

Second quarter

Third quarter

Fourth quarter

Statistics	AUB	LSU
First downs	18	25
Total yards	61–293	66–563
Rushing yards	34–139	39–238
Passing yards	154	325
Passing: Comp–Att–Int	15–27–0	20–27–1
Time of possession	25:47	34:13

Team	Category	Player	Statistics
Auburn	Passing	Payton Thorne	12/23, 102 yards
Auburn	Rushing	Jeremiah Cobb	10 carries, 69 yards
Auburn	Receiving	Brandon Frazier	3 receptions, 52 yards, TD
LSU	Passing	Jayden Daniels	20/27, 325 yards, 3 TD, INT
LSU	Rushing	Logan Diggs	18 carries, 97 yards, TD
LSU	Receiving	Malik Nabers	6 receptions, 89 yards, TD

=== vs Army ===
Game Eight – Army Black Knights (2–4) at No. 19 LSU Tigers (5–2) – Game summary

Quarter	1	2	3	4	Total
Black Knights	0	0	0	0	0
No. 19 Tigers	14	24	10	14	62

at Tiger Stadium, Baton Rouge, Louisiana

- Date: October 21, 2023
- Game time: 6:30 p.m. CDT
- Game weather: Temperature: 84 °F (29 °C) • Wind: SE 4 mph • Weather: Sunny
- Game attendance: 101,776
- Referee: Jason Autrey
- TV announcers (SECN): Tom Hart (play-by-play), Jordan Rodgers (analyst) & Cole Cubelic (sideline)
- ESPN – Jayden Daniels throws for 3 TDs, runs for another score as No. 19 LSU routs Army 62–0 /// Box Score, Army at No. 19 LSU /// Army Pregame Notes /// LSU Pregame Notes /// Postgame Notes

Game information

First quarter

- (12:05) LSU TD – Logan Diggs 2-yard rush, Damian Ramos kick
  Drive: 8 plays, 75 yards, 2:55; LSU 7–0
- (05:26) LSU TD – Brian Thomas Jr. 86-yard pass from Jayden Daniels, Damian Ramos kick
  Drive: 2 plays, 92 yards, 0:52; LSU 14–0

Second quarter

- (14:22) LSU TD – Brian Thomas Jr. 8-yard pass from Jayden Daniels, Damian Ramos kick
  Drive: 3 plays, 33 yards, 1:13; LSU 21–0
- (09:08) LSU TD – Jayden Daniels 1-yard rush, Damian Ramos kick
  Drive: 5 plays, 37 yards, 2:20; LSU 28–0
- (02:19) LSU FG – Damian Ramos 35-yard field goal
  Drive: 7 plays, 24 yards, 2:42; LSU 31–0
- (00:57) LSU TD – Malik Nabers 26-yard pass from Jayden Daniels, Damian Ramos kick
  Drive: 3 plays, 72 yards, 0:27; LSU 38–0

Third quarter

- (09:07) LSU TD – Malik Nabers 51-yard pass from Garrett Nussmeier, Damian Ramos kick
  Drive: 4 plays, 72 yards, 1:22; LSU 45–0
- (01:48) LSU FG – Damian Ramos 32-yard field goal
  Drive: 11 plays, 20 yards, 5:25; LSU 48–0

Fourth quarter

- (04:40) LSU TD – Noah Cain 2-yard rush, Damian Ramos kick
  Drive: 13 plays, 60 yards, 8:20; LSU 55–0
- (00:40) LSU TD – Trey Holly 67-yard rush, Damian Ramos kick
  Drive: 3 plays, 70 yards, 1:53; LSU 62–0

Statistics	ARMY	LSU
First downs	12	23
Total yards	58–193	60–570
Rushing yards	43–151	33–201
Passing yards	42	369
Passing: Comp–Att–Int	6–15–3	18–27–0
Time of possession	31:49	28:11

Team	Category	Player	Statistics
Army	Passing	Champ Harris	4/9, 22 yards, INT
Army	Rushing	Kanye Udoh	21 carries, 108 yards
Army	Receiving	Casey Reynolds	4 receptions, 26 yards
LSU	Passing	Jayden Daniels	11/15, 279 yards, 3 TD
LSU	Rushing	Trey Holly	6 carries, 91 yards, TD
LSU	Receiving	Brian Thomas Jr.	3 receptions, 122 yards, 2 TD

=== at No. 8 Alabama (rivalry) ===
Game Nine – No. 14 LSU Tigers (5–2) at No. 8 Alabama Crimson Tide (7–1) – Game summary

Quarter	1	2	3	4	Total
No. 14 LSU	7	14	7	0	28
No. 8 Alabama	14	7	14	7	42

at Bryant–Denny Stadium • Tuscaloosa, Alabama

- Date: Saturday, November 4, 2023
- Game time: 6:45 p.m. CDT
- Game weather: 63, Clear, Wind NE @ 1 mph
- Game attendance: 100,077
- Referee: Daniel Gautreaux
- TV announcers (CBS): Brad Nessler (play-by-play), Gary Danielson (color), and Jenny Dell (sideline)

Game information

First quarter

Second quarter

Third quarter

Fourth quarter

Statistics	LSU	ALA
First downs	21	28
Total yards	478	507
Rushing yards	206	288
Passing yards	272	219
Passing: Comp–Att–Int		
Time of possession	26:27	33:33

Team	Category	Player	Statistics
LSU	Passing	Jayden Daniels	15/24, 219 yards, 2 TD, 1 INT
LSU	Rushing	Jayden Daniels	11 carries, 163 yards, 1 TD
LSU	Receiving	Malik Nabers	10 receptions, 171 yards, 1 TD
Alabama	Passing	Jalen Milroe	15/23, 219 yards
Alabama	Rushing	Jalen Milroe	20 carries, 155 yards, 4 TD
Alabama	Receiving	Isaiah Bond	5 receptions, 60 yards

=== vs Florida (rivalry) ===
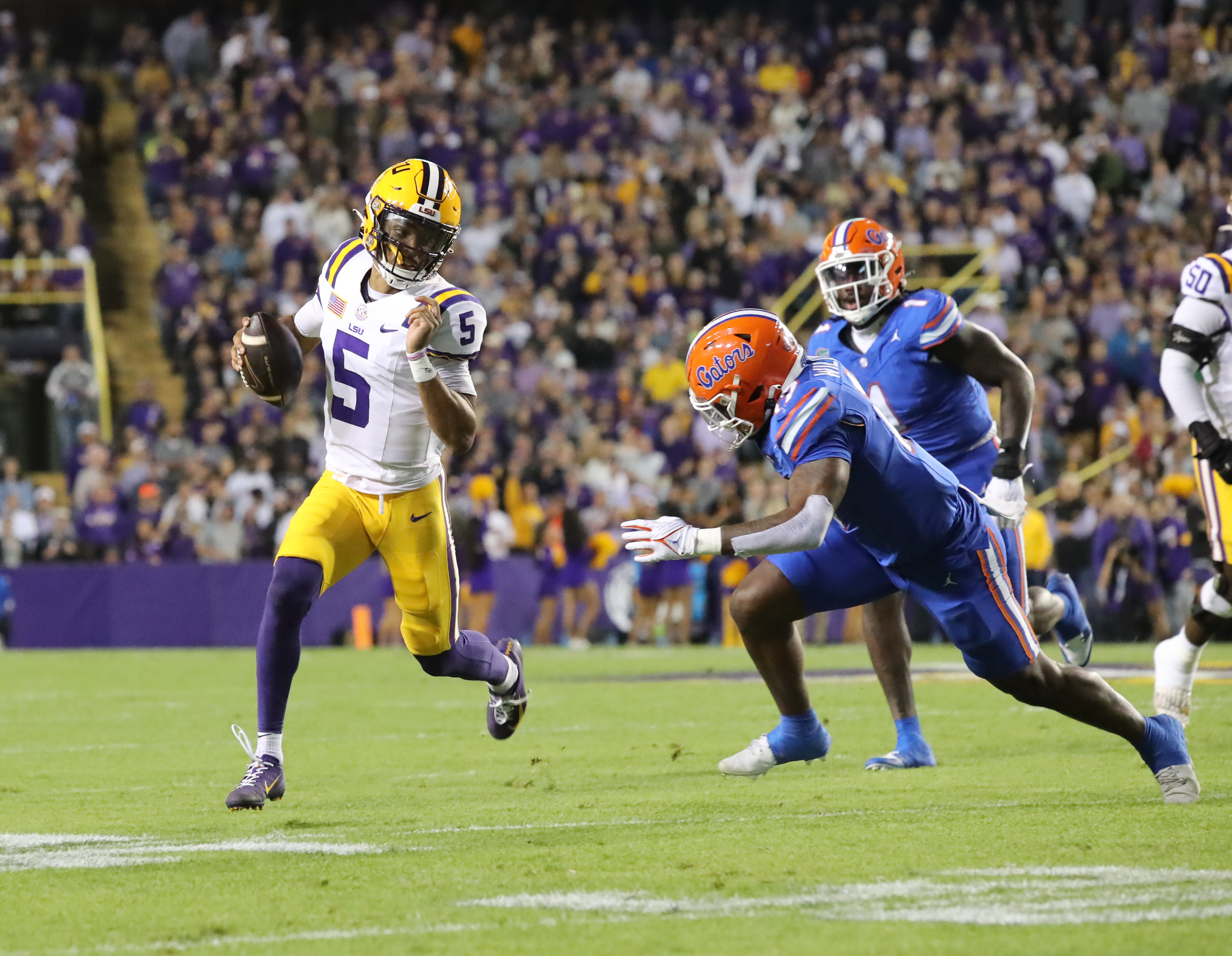
Against the Florida Gators, quarterback Jayden Daniels became the first player in college football history to pass for 350 yards while rushing for 200 in the same game.

Game Ten – Florida Gators (5–4) at No. 19 LSU Tigers (6–3) – Game summary

Quarter	1	2	3	4	Total
Florida	7	7	14	7	35
No. 19 LSU	7	10	21	14	52

at Tiger Stadium • Baton Rouge, Louisiana

- Date: Saturday, November 11, 2023
- Game time: 6:39 p.m. CST
- Game weather: Temperature: 64 °F (18 °C) • Wind: NE at 5 miles per hour (8.0 km/h) • Weather: cloudy
- Game attendance: 102,321
- Referee: Steve Marlowe
- TV announcers (SECN): Tom Hart (play-by-play), Cole Cubelic (analyst), Alyssa Lang (sideline reporter)

Game information

First quarter

- (11:59) LSU – Josh Williams 1-yard run (Damian Ramos kick) (Drive: 7 plays, 75 yards, 3:01; LSU 7-0)
- (8:58) FLA – Eugene Wilson III 9-yard pass from Graham Mertz (Trey Smack kick) (Drive: 8 plays, 75 yards, 3:01; Tied 7-7)

Second quarter

- (11:52) LSU – Damian Ramos 28-yard field goal (Drive: 7 plays, 79 yards, 2:48; LSU 10-7)
- (8:21) LSU – Jayden Daniels 85-yard run (Damian Ramos kick) (Drive: 1 play, 85 yards, 0:13; LSU 17-7)
- (4:30) FLA – Trevor Etienne 7-yard run (Trey Smack kick) (Drive: 8 plays, 75 yards, 3:51; LSU 17-14)

Third quarter

- (11:05) LSU – Kaleb Jackson 5-yard run (Damian Ramos kick) (Drive: 6 plays, 81 yards, 2:32; LSU 24-14)
- (9:37) FLA – Trevor Etienne 21-yard run (Trey Smack kick) (Drive: 4 plays, 75 yards, 1:28; LSU 24-21)
- (7:16) FLA – Graham Mertz 1-yard run (Trey Smack kick) (Drive: 5 plays, 23 yards, 2:16; Florida 28-24)
- (6:09) LSU – Jayden Daniels 51-yard run (Damian Ramos kick) (Drive: 4 plays, 75 yards, 1:07; LSU 31-28)
- (2:18) LSU – Noah Cain 6-yard pass from Jayden Daniels (Damian Ramos kick) (Drive: 5 plays, 70 yards, 2:01; LSU 38-28)

Fourth quarter

- (10:27) FLA – Trevor Etienne 5-yard run (Trey Smack kick) (Drive: 13 plays, 75 yards, 6:51; LSU 38-35)
- (9:14) LSU – Brian Thomas Jr. 37-yard pass from Jayden Daniels (Damian Ramos kick) (Drive: 3 plays, 75 yards, 1:13; LSU 45-35)
- (2:25) LSU – Brian Thomas Jr. 7-yard pass from Jayden Daniels (Damian Ramos kick) (Drive: 7 plays, 49 yards, 4:09; LSU 52-35)

Statistics	FLA	LSU
First downs	27	25
Total yards	80–488	61–701
Rushing yards	42–177	35–329
Passing yards	311	372
Passing: Comp–Att–Int	23–38–0	17–26–0
Time of possession	34:24	25:36

Team	Category	Player	Statistics
Florida	Passing	Graham Mertz	26/38 yards, 311 yards, 1 TD
Florida	Rushing	Trevor Etienne	18 carries, 99 yards, 3 TD
Florida	Receiving	Ricky Pearsall	7 receptions, 103 yards
LSU	Passing	Jayden Daniels	17/26, 372 yards, 3 TD
LSU	Rushing	Jayden Daniels	12 carries, 234 yards, 2 TD
LSU	Receiving	Brian Thomas Jr.	6 receptions, 150 yards, 2 TD

=== vs Georgia State ===
Game Eleven – Georgia State Panthers at No. 15 LSU Tigers – Game summary

Quarter	1	2	3	4	Total
Georgia State	7	7	0	0	14
No. 15 LSU	14	21	7	14	56

at Tiger Stadium • Baton Rouge, Louisiana

- Date: Saturday, November 18, 2023
- Game time: 7:00 p.m. CDT
- Game weather: –
- Game attendance: 100,212
- Referee: –
- TV announcers (ESPN2): Roy Philpott (play-by-play) and Roddy Jones (analyst)

Game information

First quarter

Second quarter

Third quarter

Fourth quarter

Statistics	GSU	LSU
First downs		
Total yards		
Rushing yards		
Passing yards		
Passing: Comp–Att–Int		
Time of possession		

Team	Category	Player	Statistics
Georgia State	Passing		
Georgia State	Rushing		
Georgia State	Receiving		
LSU	Passing		
LSU	Rushing		
LSU	Receiving		

=== vs Texas A&M (rivalry) ===
Game Twelve – Texas A&M Aggies (7-4) at No. 14 LSU Tigers (8-3) – Game summary

Quarter	1	2	3	4	Total
Texas A&M	0	17	7	6	30
No. 14 LSU	7	7	7	21	42

at Tiger Stadium • Baton Rouge, Louisiana

- Date: Saturday, November 25, 2023
- Game time: 11:00 a.m. CST
- Game weather: Cloudy, 62 °F (17 °C)
- Game attendance: 101,178
- Referee: Matt Loeffler
- TV announcers (ESPN): Bob Wischusen, Robert Griffin III, and Kris Budden

Game information

First quarter

- LSU – Logan Diggs 1-yard run (Damian Ramos kick), 7:52. Tigers 7–0. Drive: 9 plays, 60 yards, 4:04.

Second quarter

- TAMU – Le'Veon Moss 2-yard run (Randy Bond kick), 13:43. Tied 7–7. Drive: 17 plays, 67 yards, 9:02.
- TAMU – Randy Bond 48-yard field goal, 8:17. Aggies 10–7. Drive: 9 plays, 35 yards, 4:05.
- LSU – Malik Nabers 6-yard pass from Jayden Daniels (Damian Ramos kick), 5:04. Tigers 14–10. Drive: 7 plays, 65 yards, 3:13.
- TAMU – Jake Johnson 14-yard pass from Jaylen Henderson (Randy Bond kick), 0:14. Aggies 17–14. Drive: 13 plays, 78 yards, 4:45.

Third quarter

- TAMU – Mark Nabou Jr. 1-yard run (Randy Bond kick), 11:04. Aggies 24–14. Drive: 7 plays, 75 yards, 3:56.
- LSU – Josh Williams 1-yard run (Damian Ramos kick), 7:51. Aggies 24–21. Drive: 8 plays, 73 yards, 3:09.

Fourth quarter

- LSU – Brian Thomas Jr. 23-yard pass from Jayden Daniels (Damian Ramos kick), 11:52. Tigers 28–24. Drive: 3 plays, 61 yards, 0:59.
- LSU – Malik Nabers 21-yard pass from Jayden Daniels (Damian Ramos kick), 8:25. Tigers 35–24. Drive: 4 plays, 53 yards, 1:19.
- TAMU – Max Wright 51-yard pass from Jaylen Henderson (pass failed), 7:20. Tigers 35–30. Drive: 3 plays, 64 yards, 1:01.
- LSU – Kyren Lacy 15-yard pass from Jayden Daniels (Damian Ramos kick), 4:19. Tigers 42–30. Drive: 7 plays, 75 yards, 3:01.

Statistics	TXAM	LSU
First downs	22	21
Total yards	390	389
Rushing yards	96	154
Passing yards	294	235
Passing: Comp–Att–Int	25–35–1	16–24–0
Time of possession	36:39	23:21

Team	Category	Player	Statistics
Texas A&M	Passing	Jaylen Henderson	25/35, 294 yards, 2 TD, INT
Texas A&M	Rushing	Le'Veon Moss	9 rushes, 45 yards, TD
Texas A&M	Receiving	Jahdae Walker	4 receptions, 80 yards
LSU	Passing	Jayden Daniels	16/24, 235 yards, 4 TD
LSU	Rushing	Jayden Daniels	11 rushes, 120 yards
LSU	Receiving	Malik Nabers	6 receptions, 122 yards, 2 TD

=== vs Wisconsin (ReliaQuest Bowl) ===
2024 ReliaQuest Bowl (January)
Wisconsin Badgers (7–5, 5–4) vs No. 13 LSU Tigers (9–3, 6–2) – Game summary

Quarter	1	2	3	4	Total
Badgers	14	7	10	0	31
No. 13 Tigers	0	14	14	7	35

at Raymond James Stadium • Tampa, Florida

- Date: Monday January 1st, 2024
- Game time: 12:00 p.m. EST/11:00 a.m. CST
- Game weather: Cloudy • Temperature: 65 °F (18 °C) • Wind: 2 mph (3.2 km/h) N
- Game attendance: 31,424
- Referee: Mark Durry
- TV announcers (ESPN2): Brian Custer (play-by-play), Rod Gilmore (analyst), and Lauren Sisler (sideline)
- Box score

Game information

First quarter

- WIS – Bryson Green 20-yard pass from Tanner Mordecai (Nathanial Vakos kick), 8:28. Wisconsin 7–0 Drive: 8 plays, 78 yards, 2:15.
- WIS – Will Pauling 53-yard pass from Tanner Mordecai (Nathanial Vakos kick), 0:23. Wisconsin 14–0 Drive: 2 plays, 60 yards, 0:28.

Second quarter

- LSU – Harold Perkins 1-yard run (Nathan Dibert kick), 6:00 Wisconsin 14–7 Drive: 8 plays, 60 yards, 3:11.
- LSU – Kaleb Jackson 12-yard run (Nathan Dibert kick), 1:28 Tie 14–14 Drive: 7 plays, 67 yards, 2:28.
- WIS – Will Pauling 9-yard pass from Tanner Mordecai (Nathanial Vakos kick), 0:47. Wisconsin 21–14 Drive: 5 plays, 75 yards, 0:41.

Third quarter

- WIS – Jackson Acker 33-yard run (Nathanial Vakos kick), 12:14 Wisconsin 28–14 Drive: 8 plays, 75 yards, 2:46.
- LSU – Brian Thomas Jr. 38-yard pass from Garrett Nussmeier (Nathan Dibert kick), 10:33. Wisconsin 28–21 Drive: 5 plays, 75 yards, 1:36.
- LSU – Chris Hilton Jr. 14-yard pass from Garrett Nussmeier (Nathan Dibert kick), 4:44. Tie 28–28 Drive: 8 plays, 70 yards, 3:10.
- WIS – Nathanial Vakos 21-yard field goal, 1:18. Wisconsin 31–28. Drive: 6 plays, 42 yards, 3:19.

Fourth quarter

- LSU – Brian Thomas Jr. 4-yard pass from Garrett Nussmeier (Nathan Dibert kick), 3:08. LSU 35–31 Drive: 8 plays, 98 yards, 3:02.

Statistics	Wisconsin	No. 13 LSU
First downs	22	26
Total yards	506	492
Rushing yards	128	97
Passing yards	378	395
Passing: Comp–Att–Int	27–40–0	31–45–1
Time of possession	31:00	29:00

Team	Category	Player	Statistics
Wisconsin	Passing	Tanner Mordecai	27/40, 378 yards, 3 TD
Wisconsin	Rushing	Jackson Acker	14 rushes, 86 yards, 1 TD
Wisconsin	Receiving	Will Pauling	8 receptions, 143 yards, 2 TD
No. 13 LSU	Passing	Garrett Nussmeier	31/45, 395 yards, 3 TD
No. 13 LSU	Rushing	Josh Williams	12 rushes, 51 yards
No. 13 LSU	Receiving	Brian Thomas Jr.	8 receptions, 98 yards, 2 TD

== Rankings ==
Ranking movements Legend: ██ Increase in ranking ██ Decrease in ranking
	Week															
Poll	Pre	1	2	3	4	5	6	7	8	9	10	11	12	13	14	Final
AP	5	14	14	12	13	23	22	19	15	13	18	15	14	13	13	12
Coaches	5	14	14	13	12	23	20	19	15	13	19	15	14	13	13	12
CFP	Not released									14	19	15	14	13	13	Not released

== Players drafted into the NFL ==
Round	Pick	Player	Position	NFL club
1	2	Jayden Daniels	QB	Washington Commanders
1	6	Malik Nabers	WR	New York Giants
1	23	Brian Thomas Jr.	WR	Jacksonville Jaguars
2	48	Maason Smith	DT	Jacksonville Jaguars
4	116	Jordan Jefferson	DT	Jacksonville Jaguars
6	189	Mekhi Wingo	DT	Detroit Lions
