= 2024 ReliaQuest Bowl (January) =

Postseason college football bowl game

- 38th ReliaQuest Bowl
Wisconsin Badgers	LSU Tigers
(7–5)	(9–3)
Big Ten	SEC
31	35
Head coach: Luke Fickell	Head coach: Brian Kelly
	AP / Coaches / CFP; 13 / 13 / 13
	1	2	3	4	Total
Wisconsin	14	7	10	0	31
LSU	0	14	14	7	35
- Date: January 1, 2024
- Season: 2023
- Stadium: Raymond James Stadium
- Location: Tampa, Florida
- MVP: Garrett Nussmeier (QB, LSU)
- Favorite: LSU by 10.5
- Referee: Mark Duddy (Pac-12)
- Attendance: 31,424

United States TV coverage
- Network: ESPN2
- Announcers: Brian Custer (play-by-play), Rod Gilmore (analyst), and Lauren Sisler (sideline)

The 2024 ReliaQuest Bowl was a college football bowl game played on January 1, 2024, at Raymond James Stadium in Tampa, Florida. The 38th annual ReliaQuest Bowl featured Wisconsin from the Big Ten Conference and LSU from the Southeastern Conference (SEC). The game began at approximately 12:00 p.m. EST and was aired on ESPN2. It was one of the 2023–24 bowl games concluding the 2023 FBS football season. Tampa-based cybersecurity company ReliaQuest was the title sponsor.

== Teams ==
Consistent with conference tie-ins, the bowl featured the Wisconsin Badgers of the Big Ten Conference and the LSU Tigers of the Southeastern Conference (SEC).

This was the fifth meeting between Wisconsin and LSU; entering the game, the Tigers led the Badgers in their all-time series, 3–1.

=== Wisconsin Badgers ===
The Badgers entered the game with a 7–5 record (5–4 in the Big Ten), tied for second place in the Big Ten West Division.

This was Wisconsin's sixth ReliaQuest Bowl; entering the game, the Badgers were 2–3 in prior editions of the game.

=== LSU Tigers ===
The Tigers entered the game with a 9–3 record (6–2 in the SEC), tied for second place in the SEC West Division, and ranked 13th in each of the major polls. Heisman winning quarterback Jayden Daniels sat out of the game to prepare for the NFL draft, with backup Garrett Nussmeier getting his first start of the season and earning MVP honors after throwing for 395 yards and three touchdowns.

This was LSU's third ReliaQuest bowl; entering the game, their official record in the game was 0–1, as their win the 2014 edition was vacated by the NCAA during 2023 for a booster-related violation. Their loss came in the 1989 Hall of Fame Bowl, when the bowl was known by that name.

== Game summary ==
2024 ReliaQuest Bowl (January)

Quarter	1	2	3	4	Total
Wisconsin	14	7	10	0	31
No. 13 LSU	0	14	14	7	35

at Raymond James Stadium • Tampa, Florida

- Date: Monday, January 1, 2024
- Game time: 12:00 p.m. EST
- Game weather: Cloudy • Temperature: 65 °F (18 °C) • Wind: 2 mph (3.2 km/h) N
- Game attendance: 31,424
- Referee: Mark Durry
- TV announcers (ESPN2): Brian Custer (play-by-play), Rod Gilmore (analyst), and Lauren Sisler (sideline)
- Box score

Scoring summary

Quarter	Time	Drive			Team	Scoring information	Score	
Quarter	Time	Plays	Yards	TOP	Team	Scoring information	WIS	LSU
1	8:28	5	78	2:15	WIS	Bryson Green 20-yard touchdown reception from Tanner Mordecai, Nathanial Vakos kick good	7	0
1	0:23	2	60	0:28	WIS	Will Pauling 53-yard touchdown reception from Tanner Mordecai, Nathanial Vakos kick good	14	0
2	6:00	8	60	3:11	LSU	Harold Perkins 1-yard touchdown run, Damian Ramos kick good	14	7
2	1:28	7	67	2:28	LSU	Kaleb Jackson 12-yard touchdown run, Damian Ramos kick good	14	14
2	0:47	5	75	0:41	WIS	Will Pauling 9-yard touchdown reception from Tanner Mordecai, Nathanial Vakos kick good	21	14
3	12:14	8	75	2:46	WIS	Jackson Acker 33-yard touchdown run, Nathanial Vakos kick good	28	14
3	10:33	5	75	1:36	LSU	Brian Thomas Jr. 38-yard touchdown reception from Garrett Nussmeier, Damian Ramos kick good	28	21
3	4:44	8	70	3:10	LSU	Chris Hilton Jr. 14-yard touchdown reception from Garrett Nussmeier, Damian Ramos kick good	28	28
3	1:18	6	42	3:19	WIS	21-yard field goal by Nathanial Vakos	31	28
4	3:08	8	98	3:02	LSU	Brian Thomas Jr. 4-yard touchdown reception from Garrett Nussmeier, Damian Ramos kick good	31	35
"TOP" = time of possession. For other American football terms, see Glossary of American football.							6	45

=== Statistics ===
Statistics	WIS	LSU
First downs	22	26
Plays–yards	74–506	70–492
Rushes–yards	34–128	25–97
Passing yards	378	395
Passing: comp–att–int	27–40–0	31–45–1
Turnovers		
Time of possession	31:00	29:00

Team	Category	Player	Statistics
Wisconsin	Passing	Tanner Mordecai	27–40–3–0
Wisconsin	Rushing	Jackson Acker	14–86–1
Wisconsin	Receiving	Will Pauling	8–143–2
LSU	Passing	Garrett Nussmeier	31–45–3–1
LSU	Rushing	Josh Williams	12–51–0
LSU	Receiving	Brian Thomas Jr.	8–98–2
