= 2024 ReliaQuest Bowl =

2024 ReliaQuest Bowl refers to the following:

- 2024 ReliaQuest Bowl (January), contested following the 2023 season, between Wisconsin and LSU on January 1, 2024
- 2024 ReliaQuest Bowl (December), will follow the 2024 season, scheduled for December 31, 2024
