= Doug Nussmeier =

American football player and coach (born 1970)

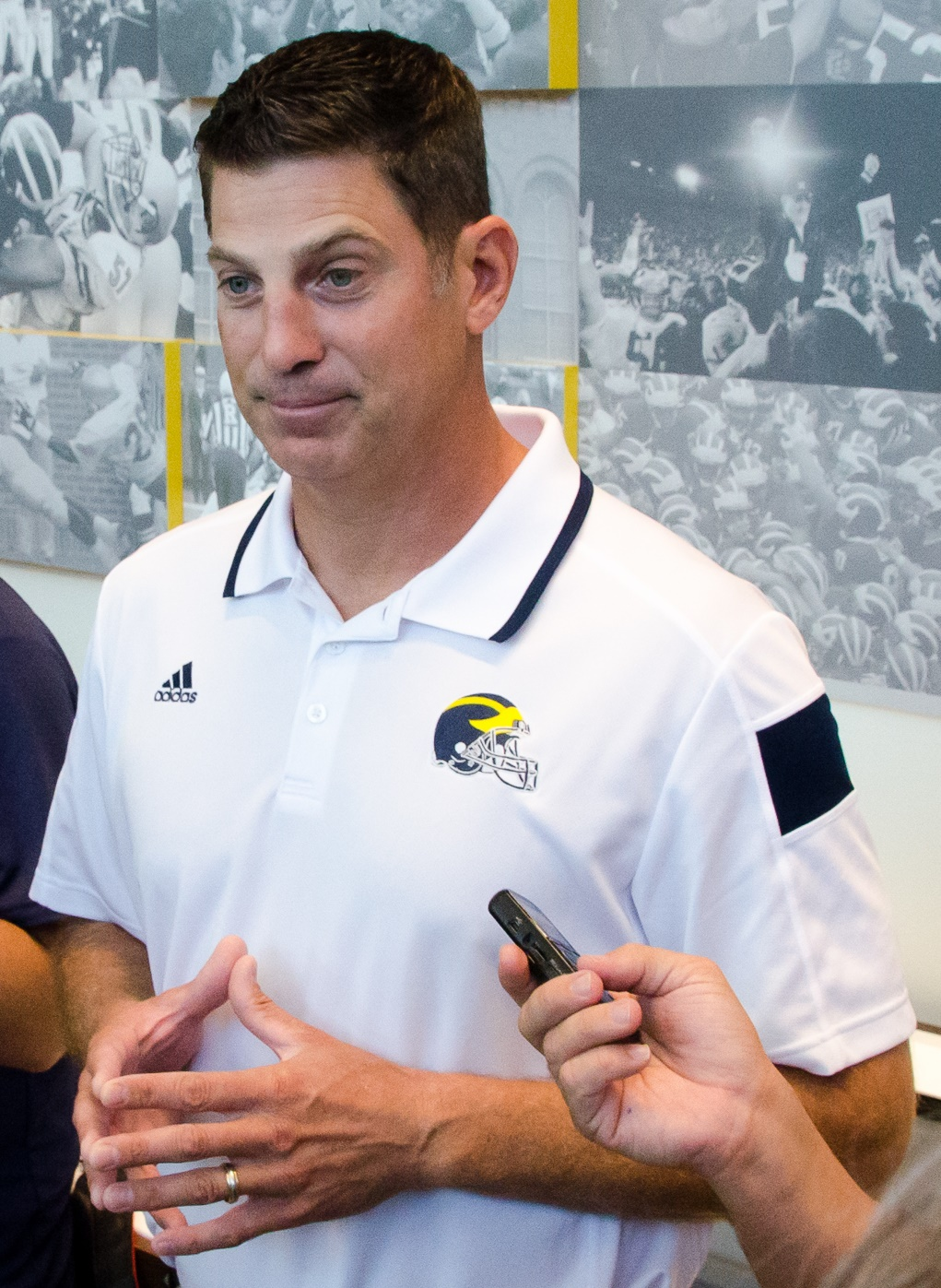
- Nussmeier with the Michigan Wolverines in 2014

New Orleans Saints
- Title: Offensive coordinator

Personal information
- Born: December 11, 1970 (age 55); Portland, Oregon, U.S.
- Listed height: 6 ft 3 in (1.91 m)
- Listed weight: 211 lb (96 kg)

Career information
- Position: Quarterback (No. 13)
- High school: Lakeridge (Lake Oswego, Oregon)
- College: Idaho (1989–1993)
- NFL draft: 1994: 4th round, 116th overall pick

Career history

Playing
- New Orleans Saints (1994–1997); Denver Broncos (1998)*; Indianapolis Colts (1998); Chicago Bears (1999)*; BC Lions (2000)
- * Offseason or practice squad member only

Coaching
- BC Lions (2001) Quarterbacks coach; Ottawa Renegades (2002) Quarterbacks coach; Michigan State (2003–2005) Quarterbacks coach; St. Louis Rams (2006–2007) Quarterbacks coach; Fresno State (2008) Offensive coordinator & quarterbacks coach; Washington (2009–2011) Offensive coordinator & quarterbacks coach; Alabama (2012–2013) Offensive coordinator & quarterbacks coach; Michigan (2014) Offensive coordinator & quarterbacks coach; Florida (2015–2017) Offensive coordinator & quarterbacks coach; Dallas Cowboys (2018–2019) Tight ends coach; Dallas Cowboys (2020–2022) Quarterbacks coach; Los Angeles Chargers (2023) Quarterbacks coach; Philadelphia Eagles (2024) Quarterbacks coach; New Orleans Saints (2025–present) Offensive coordinator

Awards and highlights
- As a player: Grey Cup champion (2000); Walter Payton Award (1993); As a coach: Super Bowl champion (LIX); BCS national champion (2012)

Career NFL statistics
- Passing attempts: 82
- Passing completions: 46
- Completion percentage: 56.1%
- TD–INT: 1–4
- Passing yards: 455
- Passer rating: 25.6
- Stats at Pro Football Reference
- Coaching profile at Pro Football Reference

Douglas Keith Nussmeier (born December 11, 1970) is an American professional football coach and former quarterback who is the offensive coordinator for the New Orleans Saints of the National Football League (NFL). Nussmeier played college football for the Idaho Vandals football, winning the Walter Payton Award as the most outstanding offensive player in NCAA Division I-AA. He was selected by the New Orleans Saints in the fourth round of the 1994 NFL draft. He finished his playing career with the CFL's BC Lions. Prior to joining the Saints’ coaching staff, he served as the quarterbacks coach for the Philadelphia Eagles.

Nussmeier previously served as an assistant coach for the Florida Gators, the Michigan Wolverines, the Alabama Crimson Tide, the Washington Huskies, the Fresno State Bulldogs and the Michigan State Spartans. Nussmeier has also previously served as quarterbacks coach for the St. Louis Rams, the Dallas Cowboys, the Ottawa Renegades, and the BC Lions. Nussmeier is the father of quarterback Garrett Nussmeier.

== Early life ==
Born in Portland, Oregon, Nussmeier is a 1989 graduate of Lakeridge High School in Lake Oswego, a suburb south of Portland. He did not start at quarterback for the Pacers football team until his senior season.

== Playing career ==
=== College ===
Though he followed Pac-10 quarterbacks Erik Wilhelm and Jason Palumbis at Lakeridge, the left-handed Nussmeier was not recruited by the conference. He played college football for the Idaho Vandals under John L. Smith, and won the 1993 Walter Payton Award, presented annually to the Division I-AA player of the year. That year, Nussmeier threw a school-record 33 touchdown passes, leading the Vandals to an 11–3 record and the national semifinals. A four-year starter at quarterback, Nussmeier succeeded John Friesz, another Walter Payton Award winner in 1989, Nussmeier's redshirt season.

As a fifth-year senior in 1993, Nussmeier had a QB rating of 172.2 - completing 185-of-304 throws (.609) for 2,960 yards and a school-record 33 touchdowns. Nussmeier still ranks among the NCAA I-AA all-time leaders in passing (No. 9 with 10,824 career yards) and total offense (No. 10 at 309.1 yards per game). He is one of only five quarterbacks in NCAA history to throw for at least 10,000 yards and rush for 1,000 yards (1,230), joining Alcorn State's Steve McNair (1991–94), Central Florida's Daunte Culpepper (1996–98), Central Michigan's Dan LeFevour (2006–09), and Nevada's Colin Kaepernick (2007–10). Nussmeier set Vandal career records for passing yards, TD passes (91), passing efficiency (175.2), completion percentage (.609, 746–1,225) and total offense (12,054 yards; 308.4 yards per game).

Nussmeier earned his bachelor's degree in business from the University of Idaho in 1994.

=== National Football League ===
Pre-draft measurables
| Height | Weight | Arm length | Hand span | 40-yard dash | 10-yard split | 20-yard split | 20-yard shuttle | Vertical jump |
|---|---|---|---|---|---|---|---|---|
| 6 ft 2 7/8 in (1.90 m) | 211 lb (96 kg) | 31 1/4 in (0.79 m) | 9 5/8 in (0.24 m) | 4.88 s | 1.65 s | 2.79 s | 4.13 s | 33.0 in (0.84 m) |

Nussmeier was selected by the Saints in the fourth round of the 1994 NFL draft, 116th overall. He was the fourth quarterback selected, behind first round selections Heath Shuler and Trent Dilfer, and fellow fourth-rounder Perry Klein who was chosen nine picks previously.

Nussmeier was a reserve quarterback in the NFL for five seasons in the mid-1990s, spending four years with the New Orleans Saints (1994–97) and one with the Indianapolis Colts (1998). Over his NFL career, he saw playing time in eight regular-season games, throwing for 455 yards, with one touchdown and four interceptions. In 1998, Nussmeier spent part of training camp with the Denver Broncos, but was released prior to the regular season and picked up by the Colts. He is one of only 32 left-handed quarterbacks to play in the NFL.

=== Canadian Football League ===
Nussmeier finished his playing career with the BC Lions of the CFL in 2000, and stayed with the organization as the quarterbacks coach for 2001.

== Coaching career ==
=== Canadian Football League ===
After coaching the quarterbacks for the BC Lions in 2001, he became the quarterbacks coach and de facto offensive coordinator of the Ottawa Renegades in 2002.

=== Michigan State ===
In 2003, Nussmeier was hired as the quarterbacks coach at Michigan State under his college head coach, John L. Smith. He would serve in this role for three seasons (2003-05).

=== St. Louis Rams ===
In 2006, Nussmeier was hired by the St. Louis Rams as their quarterbacks coach under head coach Scott Linehan for the St. Louis Rams for two seasons (2006–07).

=== Fresno State ===
Nussmeier was the offensive coordinator and quarterbacks coach at Fresno State for a season in 2008.

=== Washington ===
Nussmeier was hired in the same capacity at Washington in Seattle in early 2009 under new head coach Steve Sarkisian. His annual salary at UW was just under $300,000.

=== Alabama ===
In January 2012, Nussmeier became the new offensive coordinator and quarterbacks coach at Alabama in Tuscaloosa under head coach Nick Saban, replacing outgoing coordinator Jim McElwain, the new head coach at Colorado State. Under Nussmeier's guidance in 2012, junior quarterback A. J. McCarron set the school record for touchdowns in a season with 26. McCarron threw an additional four touchdowns in the national championship game against Notre Dame in a 42–14 victory, which allowed McCarron to set another school record for career touchdown passes.

=== Michigan ===
In 2014, Nussmeier was hired at Michigan in Ann Arbor on January 9, following the firing of offensive coordinator Al Borges.

=== Florida ===
Michigan head coach Brady Hoke was fired after that season on December 2, and Nussmeier was hired at Florida in Gainesville a few weeks later, on the staff of new head coach Jim McElwain. In his third season with the Gators in 2017, McElwain was fired in late October and Nussmeier was let go a month later.

=== Dallas Cowboys ===
On February 14, 2018, Nussmeier was hired by the Dallas Cowboys as their tight ends coach under head coach Jason Garrett and offensive coordinator Scott Linehan. In 2020, Nussmeier was retained by the Cowboys under new head coach Mike McCarthy, being promoted to quarterbacks coach.

=== Los Angeles Chargers ===
In 2023, Nussmeier served as the quarterbacks coach for the Los Angeles Chargers, joining his Dallas Cowboys offensive coordinator Kellen Moore.

=== Philadelphia Eagles ===
In 2024, Nussmeier once again followed Kellen Moore, with both of them joining the Philadelphia Eagles in the same roles that they served with the Chargers. He was part of the staff that won Super Bowl LIX over the Kansas City Chiefs.

=== New Orleans Saints ===
After Moore was named the new head coach of the New Orleans Saints, it was announced later that month that Nussmeier had been hired as the team's offensive coordinator on February 20, 2025.

== Personal life ==
Nussmeier and his wife Christie have two sons and a daughter. His son Garrett was the quarterback for the LSU Tigers and currently is the third string quarterback for the Kansas City Chiefs, backing up Patrick Mahomes.
