= Hunter Wohler =

American football player (born 2003)

- Wohler in 2024

No. 30 – Indianapolis Colts
- Position: Safety
- Roster status: Active

Personal information
- Born: January 12, 2003 (age 23); Muskego, Wisconsin, U.S.
- Listed height: 6 ft 2 in (1.88 m)
- Listed weight: 213 lb (97 kg)

Career information
- High school: Muskego (WI)
- College: Wisconsin (2021–2024)
- NFL draft: 2025: 7th round, 232nd overall pick

Career history
- Indianapolis Colts (2025–present)

Awards and highlights
- Second-team All-Big Ten (2023)
- Stats at Pro Football Reference

Hunter Wohler (born January 12, 2003) is an American professional football safety for the Indianapolis Colts of the National Football League (NFL). He played college football for the Wisconsin Badgers and was selected by the Colts in the seventh round of the 2025 NFL draft.

== Early life ==
Wohler attended Muskego High School in Muskego, Wisconsin where he was a multi-sport athlete, participating in both football and basketball. During his career, he had 355 tackles, nine interceptions and led the Muskego Warriors to three-straight WIAA State Championships. As a senior, he was the Wisconsin Gatorade Football Player of the Year. He committed to University of Wisconsin-Madison to play college football.

== College career ==
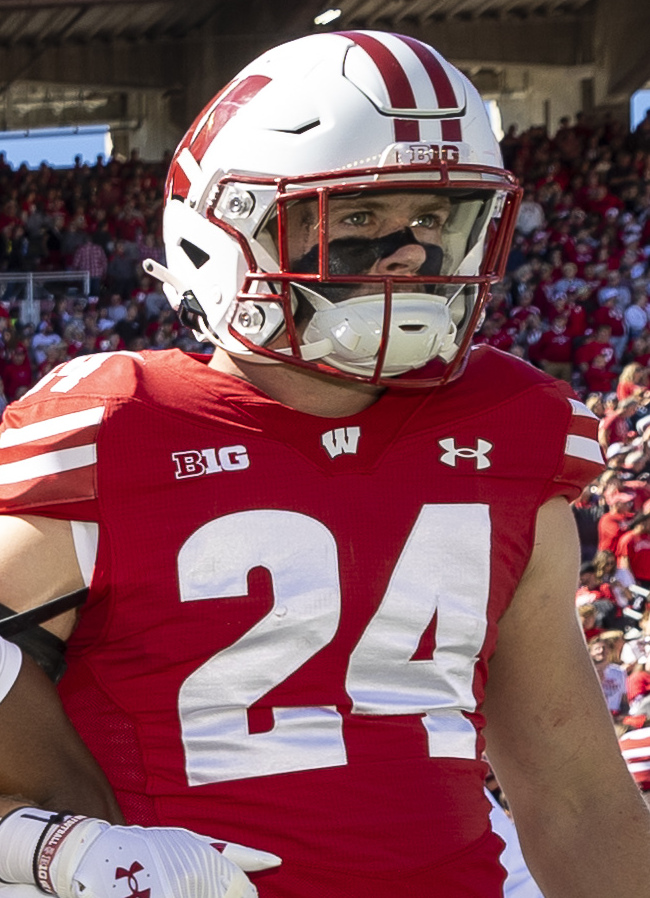
Wohler during a 2024 Wisconsin football game

Wohler after a 2024 game

Wohler played college football for the Wisconsin Badgers as a safety. He played in all 13 games as a true freshman at Wisconsin in 2021, recording 17 tackles and one sack. He played in only six games with one start his sophomore year due to injury and finished the year with 21 tackles and one interception. Wohler returned to Wisconsin as a starter in 2023.

== Professional career ==
Pre-draft measurables
Height	Weight	Arm length	Hand span	Wingspan	40-yard dash	10-yard split	20-yard split	20-yard shuttle	Three-cone drill	Vertical jump	Broad jump
6 ft 2 in (1.88 m)	213 lb (97 kg)	30 5/8 in (0.78 m)	9 1/4 in (0.23 m)	6 ft 3 3/8 in (1.91 m)	4.57 s	1.54 s	2.66 s	4.25 s	6.72 s	37.0 in (0.94 m)	10 ft 0 in (3.05 m)
All values from NFL Combine

Wohler was selected by the Indianapolis Colts with the 232nd overall pick in the seventh round of the 2025 NFL draft. He signed a four-year contract with the Colts on May 9. The Colts initially listed him as a linebacker before reverting him back to a safety, though general manager Chris Ballard stated that Wohler would spend time playing both positions. He was placed on injured reserve on August 18, ending his 2025 season after suffering a Lisfranc injury.
