= Garrett Nussmeier =

American football player (born 2002)

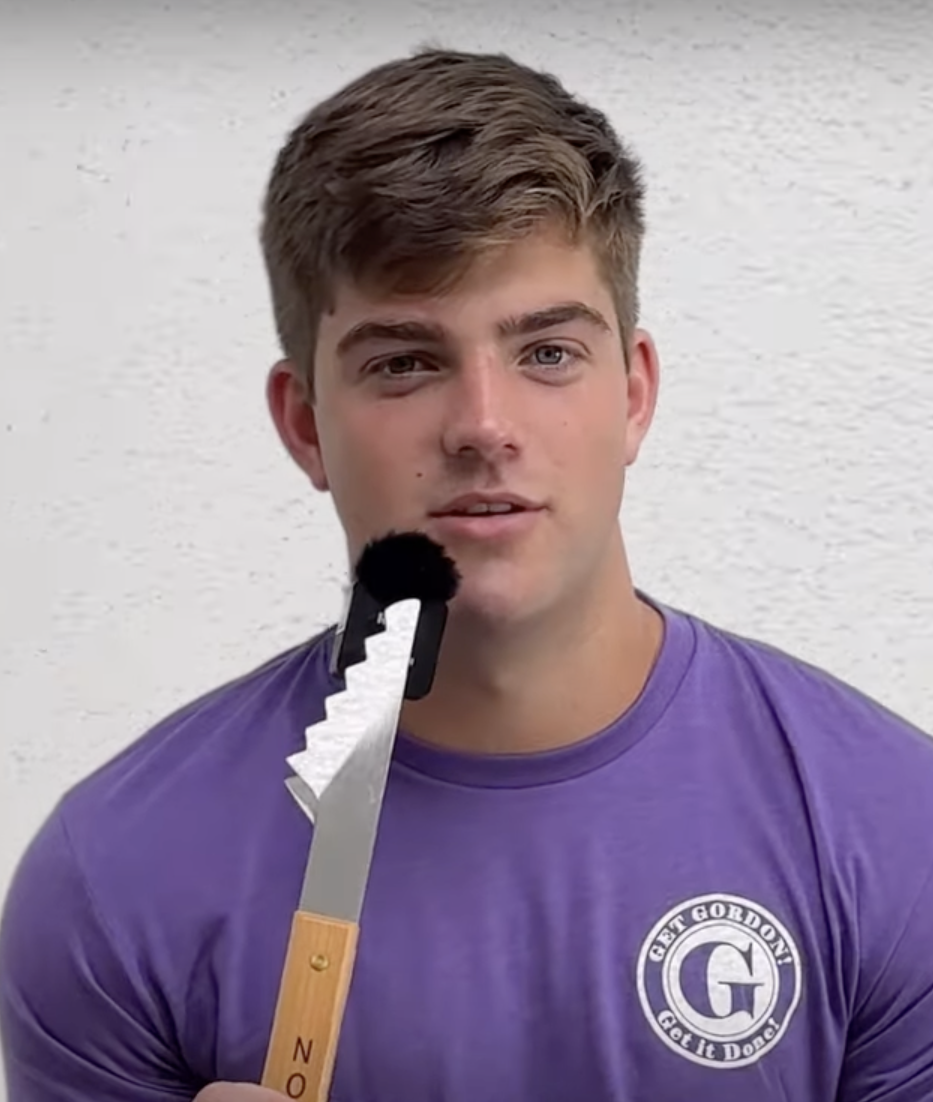
- Nussmeier in 2023

No. 19 – Kansas City Chiefs
- Position: Quarterback
- Roster status: Active

Personal information
- Born: February 7, 2002 (age 24); Lake Charles, Louisiana, U.S
- Listed height: 6 ft 1 in (1.85 m)
- Listed weight: 205 lb (93 kg)

Career information
- High school: Edward S. Marcus (Flower Mound, Texas)
- College: LSU (2021–2025)
- NFL draft: 2026: 7th round, 249th overall pick

Career history
- Kansas City Chiefs (2026–present)
- Stats at Pro Football Reference

Garrett Paul Nussmeier (born February 7, 2002) is an American professional football quarterback for the Kansas City Chiefs of the National Football League (NFL). He played college football at LSU and was selected by the Chiefs in the seventh round of the 2026 NFL draft. He is the son of Doug Nussmeier, former NFL player and current offensive coordinator of the New Orleans Saints.

== Early life ==
Nussmeier was born on February 7, 2002, in Lake Charles, Louisiana. Due to his father Doug's career as a football coach, he moved 12 times growing up, living in eight different states and Canada, while spending summers in Lake Charles, his mother's hometown. Nussmeier attended Edward S. Marcus High School in Flower Mound, Texas where he passed 3,788 yards and 38 touchdowns in his junior season. As a senior, he passed for 2,815 yards with 33 touchdowns and five interceptions. Nussmeier committed to play college football at LSU over offers from Texas, Texas A&M, Miami, Georgia, Baylor, and North Carolina.

== College career ==
Nussmeier played in four games as a true freshman before redshirting the season. Following the departure of Max Johnson from the team, LSU petitioned the NCAA to let him start the 2022 Texas Bowl but still maintain his redshirt status, which was denied. Nussmeier finished the season with 29 pass completions on 57 attempts for 329 yards with two touchdown passes and two interceptions.

Nussmeier competed with Myles Brennan and Arizona State transfer Jayden Daniels entering his redshirt freshman season in 2022, ultimately losing the starting job to Daniels. Nussmeier entered seven games, all off the bench, throughout which he completed 62% of his passes, totaling 800 yards, five touchdowns, and four interceptions. He made his first start with the team in the 2024 ReliaQuest Bowl in January after Daniels sat out to prepare for the NFL draft, earning MVP honors after throwing for 395 yards and three touchdowns.

Nussmeier was named the starter for the 2024 season. He led the team to a 9–4 season including an overtime win over 9th-ranked Ole Miss.

Nussmeier opted to return to LSU for his redshirt senior season. As the starter, he went 5–4 with wins over 4th-ranked Clemson and SEC foe Florida. However, Nussmeier received criticism from fans after a bad game in a loss vs Ole Miss at Vaught–Hemingway Stadium. LSU also fell short at Vanderbilt, 31–24. He was benched in games against Texas A&M and Alabama. He had an abdominal injury that had been affecting him all year, so before the game against Arkansas, he was benched. Michael Van Buren Jr. took his spot as the starting quarterback for the remainder of the season.

=== Statistics ===
Season	Team	Games			Passing								Rushing			
Season	Team	GP	GS	Record	Comp	Att	Pct	Yards	Avg	TD	Int	Rate	Att	Yards	Avg	TD
2021	LSU	4	0	—	29	57	50.9	329	5.8	2	2	103.9	5	-46	-9.2	0
2022	LSU	7	0	—	52	84	61.9	800	9.5	5	4	152.0	1	-13	-13.0	0
2023	LSU	7	1	1–0	48	78	61.5	591	7.6	4	1	139.5	1	1	1.0	1
2024	LSU	13	13	9–4	337	525	64.2	4,043	7.7	29	12	142.7	34	-38	-1.1	3
2025	LSU	9	9	5–4	194	288	67.4	1,927	6.7	12	5	133.8	29	-57	-2.0	1
Career		40	23	15–8	660	1,032	64.0	7,690	7.5	52	24	138.6	70	-153	-2.2	5

== Professional career ==
Pre-draft measurables
Height	Weight	Arm length	Hand span	Wingspan
6 ft 1 5/8 in (1.87 m)	203 lb (92 kg)	30 3/8 in (0.77 m)	9 1/8 in (0.23 m)	6 ft 3 1/4 in (1.91 m)
All values from NFL Combine

Nussmeier was selected by the Kansas City Chiefs in the seventh round with the 249th overall pick of the 2026 NFL draft.

Nussmeier made his professional debut on August 15, 2026 during the first preseason game against the Los Angeles Rams, where he completed 13 out of 19 passes for 98 yards. He competed with Justin Fields to be the backup to Patrick Mahomes for the season. Fields won the role, and Nussmeier began the year as the third-string quarterback.

== Personal life ==
Nussmeier is a Christian. Nussmeier's father, Doug Nussmeier, played college football at Idaho and in the NFL for the New Orleans Saints before entering coaching. In July 2025, in a shared post on Instagram, Nussmeier and his high school sweetheart, Ella Springfield, announced their engagement.
