= Will Pauling =

American football player (born 2003)

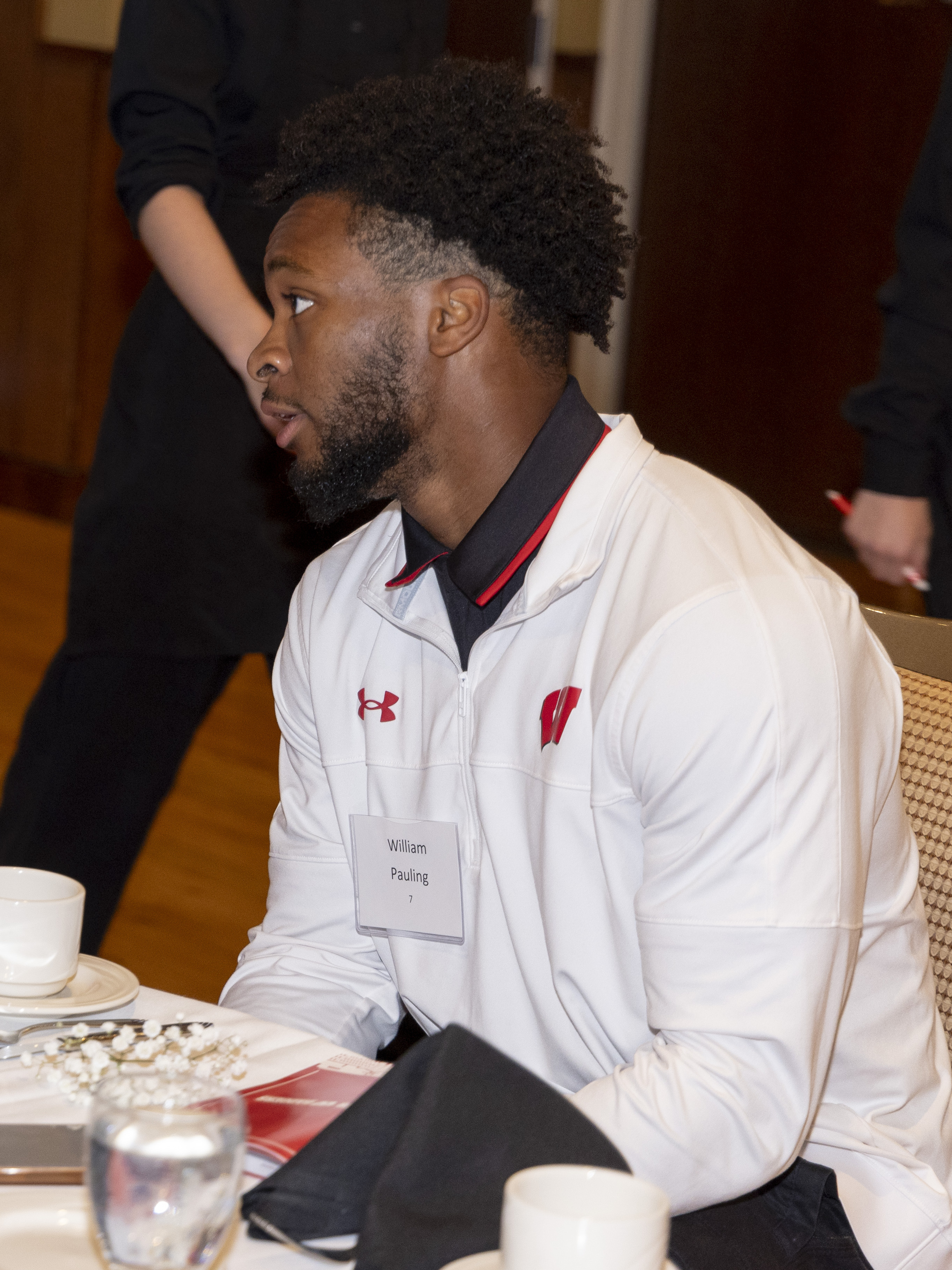
- Pauling in 2024

No. 18 – San Francisco 49ers
- Position: Wide receiver
- Roster status: Practice squad

Personal information
- Born: March 4, 2003 (age 23); Chicago, Illinois, U.S.
- Listed height: 5 ft 9 in (1.75 m)
- Listed weight: 183 lb (83 kg)

Career information
- High school: Homewood-Flossmoor (Flossmoor, Illinois)
- College: Cincinnati (2021–2022); Wisconsin (2023–2024); Notre Dame (2025)
- NFL draft: 2026: undrafted

Career history
- San Francisco 49ers (2026–present)*
- * Offseason or practice squad member only

Awards and highlights
- Third-team All-Big Ten (2023)
- Stats at Pro Football Reference

William Pauling (born March 4, 2003) is an American professional football wide receiver for the San Francisco 49ers of the National Football League (NFL). He played college football for the Cincinnati Bearcats, Wisconsin Badgers, and Notre Dame Fighting Irish.

== Early life ==
Pauling was born in Chicago where he attended high school at Homewood-Flossmoor. Pauling had a breakout junior season where he hauled in 50 receptions for 951 yards and 11 touchdowns. Pauling decided to commit to play college football for the Cincinnati Bearcats.

== College career ==
=== Cincinnati ===
In Pauling's first season in 2021 he hauled in just one reception for six yards versus SMU. In the 2022 season, Pauling brought in 12 receptions for 122 yards. After the conclusion of the 2022 season, Pauling entered the NCAA transfer portal.

=== Wisconsin ===
Pauling transferred to play for the Wisconsin Badgers, and his former head coach Luke Fickell. In week six of the 2023 season, Pauling hauled in eight receptions for 68 yards in a win over Rutgers. Two weeks later, he recorded his first career touchdown reception as he helped the Badgers comeback and defeat Illinois. In the Badgers bowl game, he had a career performance recording eight receptions for 143 yards and two touchdowns. Pauling finished the 2023 season with 74 receptions for 837 yards and six touchdowns, while also rushing for 11 yards and completing one pass for 19 yards. In 2024, during a week three loss against Alabama, Pauling completed nine receptions for 83 yards and one touchdown. He finished the season with 42 receptions for 407 yards and three touchdowns, as well as one carry for four yards.

=== Notre Dame ===
On December 24, 2024, Pauling transferred to Notre Dame. On August 18, 2025, Pauling was named a team captain. In week 7, he caught four receptions for 105 yards and one touchdown in a win over North Carolina State. In a week 10 victory against Boston College, he caught a 44-yard touchdown pass from CJ Carr in the second quarter. After twelve appearances and six starts, Pauling finished the 2025 season with 26 receptions for 381 yards and six touchdowns.

=== Statistics ===
Year	Team	GP	Receiving			
Year	Team	GP	Rec	Yds	Avg	TD
2021	Cincinnati	4	1	6	6.0	0
2022	Cincinnati	9	12	122	10.2	0
2023	Wisconsin	13	74	837	11.3	6
2024	Wisconsin	10	42	407	9.7	3
2025	Notre Dame	12	26	381	14.7	6
Career		48	155	1,753	11.3	15

== Professional career ==
Pre-draft measurables
Height	Weight	Arm length	Hand span	Wingspan	40-yard dash	10-yard split	20-yard split	20-yard shuttle	Three-cone drill	Vertical jump	Broad jump
5 ft 9 1/2 in (1.77 m)	183 lb (83 kg)	29 5/8 in (0.75 m)	9 5/8 in (0.24 m)	6 ft 0 in (1.83 m)	4.48 s	1.61 s	2.57 s	4.35 s	7.02 s	42.0 in (1.07 m)	10 ft 8 in (3.25 m)
All values from Pro Day

Pauling signed with the San Francisco 49ers as an undrafted free agent on April 26, 2026. Pauling was waived by the 49ers as a part of final roster cuts on August 30; he was re–signed to the team's practice squad the next day.
