= Major Burns =

American football player (born 2002)

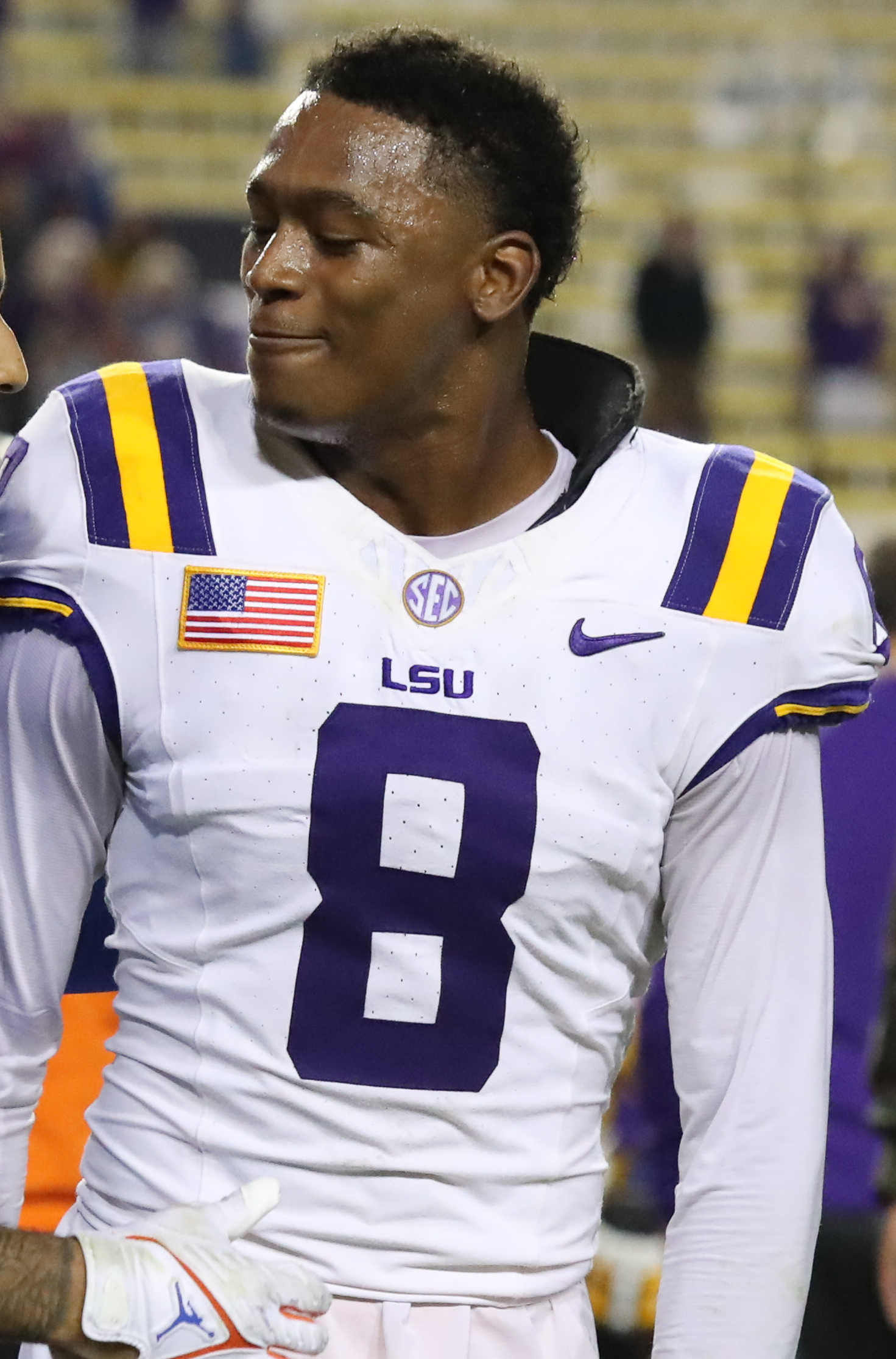
- Burns with the LSU Tigers in 2023

No. 43 – Miami Dolphins
- Position: Safety
- Roster status: Practice squad

Personal information
- Born: May 22, 2002 (age 24); Baton Rouge, Louisiana, U.S.
- Listed height: 6 ft 2 in (1.88 m)
- Listed weight: 209 lb (95 kg)

Career information
- High school: Madison Prep Academy (Baton Rouge)
- College: Georgia (2020); LSU (2021–2024)
- NFL draft: 2025: undrafted

Career history
- Chicago Bears (2025)*; Houston Gamblers (2026); Miami Dolphins (2026–present)*
- * Offseason or practice squad member only

Awards and highlights
- All-UFL Team (2026); UFL interceptions leader (2026)

Major Delmontzra Burns (born May 22, 2002) is an American professional football safety for the Miami Dolphins of the National Football League (NFL). He played college football for the Georgia Bulldogs and LSU Tigers. He also played for the Houston Gamblers of the United Football League (UFL)

== Early life ==
Burns attended Madison Prep Academy in Baton Rouge, Louisiana, where he played wide receiver and defensive back, as well as quarterback. He initially committed to play college football at LSU before flipping to Texas A&M. Burns flipped his commitment once again to the University of Georgia.

== College career ==
=== Georgia ===
As a freshman in 2020, Burns recorded five tackles in six games, and entered the NCAA transfer portal after the season.

=== LSU ===
Burns transferred to LSU to continue his career. In week 3 of the 2021 season, he recorded his first career interception in a win over Central Michigan. However, after starting five games, Burns suffered a season-ending foot injury. He finished the 2021 season with 25 tackles, a pass deflection, and an interception. Burns suffered another injury in 2022, forcing him to miss five games. He finished the season with 38 tackles with 3.5 going for a loss, and three pass deflections. In week 6 of the 2023 season, Burns intercepted a pass in the final minutes and returned it for a touchdown, as he helped the Tigers beat Missouri 49–39.

== Professional career ==
Pre-draft measurables
Height	Weight	Arm length	Hand span	Wingspan	40-yard dash	10-yard split	20-yard split	20-yard shuttle	Three-cone drill	Vertical jump	Bench press
6 ft 2 in (1.88 m)	207 lb (94 kg)	31 1/2 in (0.80 m)	9 1/8 in (0.23 m)	6 ft 3 7/8 in (1.93 m)	4.51 s	1.56 s	2.60 s	4.44 s	7.13 s	37.5 in (0.95 m)	12 reps
All values from Pro Day

=== Chicago Bears ===
Burns signed with the Chicago Bears as an undrafted free agent on May 8, 2025. He was waived on August 12 with an injury designation and reverted to injured reserve the following day. On August 21, Burns was waived from injured reserve with a settlement.

=== Houston Gamblers ===
On March 10, 2026, Burns signed with the Houston Gamblers of the United Football League (UFL). He was named to the All-UFL team, and led the league in interceptions.

=== Miami Dolphins ===
On June 15, 2026, Burns signed with the Miami Dolphins. On August 30, Burns was waived by Miami as a part of final roster cuts; he was re-signed to the team's practice squad the following day.
