= Jackson Acker =

American football player (born 2002)

Profile
- Position: Fullback

Personal information
- Born: September 17, 2002 (age 24)
- Listed height: 6 ft 1 in (1.85 m)
- Listed weight: 247 lb (112 kg)

Career information
- High school: Verona (Verona, Wisconsin)
- College: Wisconsin (2021–2025)
- NFL draft: 2026: undrafted

Career history
- Buffalo Bills (2026)*; Seattle Seahawks (2026)*
- * Offseason or practice squad member only
- Stats at Pro Football Reference

Jackson Acker (born September 17, 2002) is an American professional football fullback. He played college football for the Wisconsin Badgers.

== Professional career ==
Pre-draft measurables
Height	Weight	Arm length	Hand span	Wingspan	40-yard dash	10-yard split	20-yard split	20-yard shuttle	Three-cone drill	Vertical jump	Broad jump	Bench press
6 ft 0 5/8 in (1.84 m)	242 lb (110 kg)	32 1/8 in (0.82 m)	8 3/4 in (0.22 m)	6 ft 4 in (1.93 m)	4.68 s	1.68 s	2.70 s	4.43 s	7.34 s	32.5 in (0.83 m)	9 ft 7 in (2.92 m)	20 reps
All values from Pro Day

=== Buffalo Bills ===
On May 8, 2026, Acker signed with the Buffalo Bills as an undrafted free agent following the 2026 NFL Draft. On August 17, Acker was waived by the Bills.

=== Seattle Seahawks ===
On October 19, 2026, Acker signed with the Seattle Seahawks practice squad. On October 27, he was released.
