= Bryson Green =

American football player (born 2002)

Profile
- Position: Wide receiver

Personal information
- Born: December 30, 2002 (age 23); Woodbury, Minnesota, U.S.
- Listed height: 6 ft 1 in (1.85 m)
- Listed weight: 210 lb (95 kg)

Career information
- High school: Allen (TX)
- College: Oklahoma State (2021–2022); Wisconsin (2023–2024)
- NFL draft: 2025: undrafted

Career history
- Arizona Cardinals (2025)*
- * Offseason or practice squad member only
- Stats at Pro Football Reference

Bryson Green (born December 30, 2002) is an American professional football wide receiver. He played college football for the Oklahoma State Cowboys and Wisconsin Badgers.

== Early life ==
Green was born in Woodbury, Minnesota and lived there until moving to Texas before starting seventh grade. He attended Allen High School in Allen, Texas. He was rated as a four-star recruit and committed to play college football for the Oklahoma State Cowboys.

== College career ==
=== Oklahoma State ===
As a freshman in 2021, Green appeared in 12 games with six starts, where he notched 12 catches for 139 yards and two touchdowns. In week 2 of the 2022 season, he recorded five receptions for 83 yards and a touchdown in a win over Arizona State. In week 6, Green recorded five receptions for 115 yards and a touchdown in a victory versus Texas Tech. In week 8, he totaled five receptions for 133 yards and a touchdown in a win against Texas. Green finished the 2022 season with 36 receptions for 584 yards and five touchdowns. After the season, he entered his name into the NCAA transfer portal.

=== Wisconsin ===
Green transferred to play for the Wisconsin Badgers. During his two year career with the Badgers from 2023 to 2024, he recorded 49 receptions for 699 yards and four touchdowns in 19 games.

== Professional career ==
Pre-draft measurables
| Height | Weight | Arm length | Hand span | Wingspan | 40-yard dash | 10-yard split | 20-yard split | 20-yard shuttle | Three-cone drill | Vertical jump | Broad jump | Bench press |
|---|---|---|---|---|---|---|---|---|---|---|---|---|
| 6 ft 1 3/8 in (1.86 m) | 211 lb (96 kg) | 33 3/8 in (0.85 m) | 10 1/4 in (0.26 m) | 6 ft 7 5/8 in (2.02 m) | 4.54 s | 1.58 s | 2.55 s | 4.36 s | 6.98 s | 39.0 in (0.99 m) | 10 ft 11 in (3.33 m) | 18 reps |
All values from Pro Day

After not being selected in the 2025 NFL draft, Green signed with the Arizona Cardinals as an undrafted free agent. He was waived on August 26 as part of final roster cuts. On October 15, Green was re-signed to the team's practice squad. He was released on October 28. On December 3, Green was re-signed to the practice squad.

Green signed a reserve/future contract with Arizona on January 5, 2026. On August 24, Green was waived by the Cardinals.

== Personal life ==
Green is the twin brother of Oklahoma State wide receiver, Blaine Green. His father Bryan played as a running back for the Minnesota Golden Gophers, and his other brother Seth played as a quarterback at Minnesota.
