= 2025 LSU Tigers football team =

American college football season

2025 LSU Tigers football

Texas Bowl, L 35–38 vs. Houston
- Conference: Southeastern Conference
- Record: 7–6 (3–5 SEC)
- Head coach: Brian Kelly (4th season; first 8 games); Frank Wilson (interim; remainder of season)
- Offensive coordinator: Joe Sloan (2nd season; first 8 games); Alex Atkins (interim; remainder of season)
- Co-offensive coordinator: Cortez Hankton (2nd season)
- Offensive scheme: Multiple
- Defensive coordinator: Blake Baker (2nd season)
- Base defense: 4–3
- Home stadium: Tiger Stadium

2025 Southeastern Conference football standings
	Conf.			Overall
Team	W		L	W		L
No. 9 Alabama y^	7	–	1	11	–	4
No. 6 Georgia y$^	7	–	1	12	–	2
No. 3 Ole Miss ^	7	–	1	13	–	2
No. 8 Texas A&M ^	7	–	1	11	–	2
No. 13 Oklahoma ^	6	–	2	10	–	3
No. 12 Texas	6	–	2	10	–	3
No. 15 Vanderbilt	6	–	2	10	–	3
Missouri	4	–	4	8	–	5
Tennessee	4	–	4	8	–	5
LSU	3	–	5	7	–	6
Kentucky	2	–	6	5	–	7
Florida	2	–	6	4	–	8
Auburn	1	–	7	5	–	7
Mississippi State	1	–	7	5	–	8
South Carolina	1	–	7	4	–	8
Arkansas	0	–	8	2	–	10
Championship: Georgia 28, Alabama 7
^ – College Football Playoff participant; $ – Conference champion; y – Championship game participant; Rankings from AP Poll

The 2025 LSU Tigers football team represented Louisiana State University (LSU) as a member of the Southeastern Conference (SEC) during the 2025 NCAA Division I FBS football season. The Tigers played their home games at Tiger Stadium located in Baton Rouge, Louisiana.

Though the Tigers started the season No. 9 in the preseason AP Poll and earned a hard-fought 17–10 victory over No. 4 Clemson on the road, the team collapsed by midseason and struggled offensively. The offense was described as inconsistent with struggles in the run game and turnovers in the passing game, which led to the benching of Garrett Nussmeier, and the firing of Brian Kelly. The season ended with a Texas Bowl loss to Houston.

For the first 8 games, the Tigers were led by fourth-year head coach Brian Kelly, who was fired on October 26, following a home loss to Texas A&M. Associate head coach and running backs coach Frank Wilson was named interim head coach for the remainder of the season.

The LSU Tigers drew an average home attendance of 101,575, the 7th-highest of all American football teams in the world.

== Schedule ==
Date	Time	Opponent	Rank	Site	TV	Result	Attendance
August 30	6:30 p.m.	at No. 4 Clemson*	No. 9	Memorial Stadium; Clemson, SC	ABC	W 17–10	81,500
September 6	6:30 p.m.	Louisiana Tech*	No. 3	Tiger Stadium; Baton Rouge, LA	SECN+/ESPN+	W 23–7	101,667
September 13	6:30 p.m.	Florida	No. 3	Tiger Stadium; Baton Rouge, LA (rivalry)	ABC	W 20–10	102,158
September 20	6:45 p.m.	Southeastern Louisiana*	No. 3	Tiger Stadium; Baton Rouge, LA	SECN	W 56–10	102,219
September 27	2:30 p.m.	at No. 13 Ole Miss	No. 4	Vaught–Hemingway Stadium; Oxford, MS (Magnolia Bowl)	ABC	L 19–24	67,737
October 11	6:45 p.m.	South Carolina^{†}	No. 11	Tiger Stadium; Baton Rouge, LA	SECN	W 20–10	101,921
October 18	11:00 a.m.	at No. 17 Vanderbilt	No. 10	FirstBank Stadium; Nashville, TN	ABC	L 24–31	35,000
October 25	6:30 p.m.	No. 3 Texas A&M	No. 20	Tiger Stadium; Baton Rouge, LA (rivalry)	ABC	L 25–49	101,924
November 8	6:30 p.m.	at No. 4 Alabama		Bryant–Denny Stadium; Tuscaloosa, AL (rivalry)	ABC	L 9–20	100,077
November 15	11:45 a.m.	Arkansas		Tiger Stadium; Baton Rouge, LA (rivalry)	SECN	W 23–22	100,212
November 22	6:45 p.m.	Western Kentucky*		Tiger Stadium; Baton Rouge, LA	SECN	W 13–10	100,923
November 29	2:30 p.m.	at No. 8 Oklahoma		Gaylord Family Oklahoma Memorial Stadium; Norman, OK	ABC	L 13–17	83,734
December 27	8:15 p.m.	vs. No. 21 Houston*		NRG Stadium; Houston, TX (Texas Bowl)	ESPN	L 35–38	63,867
*Non-conference game; ^{†}Homecoming; Rankings from AP Poll (and CFP Rankings, after November 4) - Released prior to game; All times are in Central time

== Rankings ==
Ranking movements Legend: ██ Increase in ranking ██ Decrease in ranking — = Not ranked RV = Received votes ( ) = First-place votes
	Week																
Poll	Pre	1	2	3	4	5	6	7	8	9	10	11	12	13	14	15	Final
AP	9	3 (3)	3 (2)	3 (2)	4	13	11	10	20	RV	RV	—	—	—	—	—	—
Coaches	9	4 (1)	4 (1)	4 (1)	4	13	11	10	19	RV	RV	—	—	—	—	—	—
CFP	Not released										—	—	—	—	—	—	Not released

== Personnel ==
=== Roster ===
2025 LSU Tigers football team roster
Players
Coaches
Offense

Pos.	#	Name	Class
WR	0	Zavion Thomas	Sr
WR	1	Aaron Anderson	Jr
WR	2	Destyn Hill	So
WR	3	Chris Hilton Jr.	Sr
WR	4	Nic Anderson	Jr
WR	6	Barion Brown	Sr
QB	8	Ju'Juan Johnson	So
TE	10	Bauer Sharp	Sr
QB	11	Michael Van Buren Jr.	So
WR	12	Kyle Parker	So
TE	14	Trey'Dez Green	So
WR	15	Phillip Wright III	Fr
QB	16	Colin Hurley	Fr
WR	17	Jelani Watkins	Fr
QB	18	Garrett Nussmeier	Sr
QB	19	Emile Picarella III	Fr
QB	21	Tre People	Fr
RB	22	Harlem Berry	Fr
RB	23	JT Lindsey	Fr
RB	24	Joseph Ebun	So
WR	26	Cowinn Helaire	Jr
RB	28	Kaleb Jackson	Jr
RB	29	Caden Durham	So
RB	30	Malachi Lane	Sr
RB	39	Reid Chauvin	Fr
TE	45	GiVanni Peterson	Sr
TE	47	JD LaFleur	Fr
OL	53	Hayes Fuqua	Fr
OL	55	Khayree Lee Jr.	Fr
OL	56	Josh Thompson	Sr
OL	57	Carius Curne	Fr
OT	59	Tyler Miller	Fr
OL	61	Braelin Moore	Jr
OL	65	Paul Mubenga	So
OT	66	Solomon Thomas	Fr
OL	67	Bo Bordelon	Jr
OL	68	Brett Bordelon	Fr
OL	71	Tyree Adams	So
OT	73	Ethan Calloway	Fr
OL	74	Braden Augustus	So
OT	75	Weston Davis	Fr
OL	76	Christian Stamps	So
OT	77	Ory Williams	Fr
OL	78	Coen Echols	Fr
OL	79	DJ Chester	So
WR	80	Isaiah Stone	So
TE	81	Landon Craig	Fr
WR	82	Kylan Billiot	Fr
WR	83	TaRon Francis	Fr
WR	87	Noah Nash	Sr
TE	88	Donovan Green	Jr

Defense

Pos.	#	Name	Class
S	0	Tamarcus Cooley	So
CB	1	Ashton Stamps	Jr
S	2	Jardin Gilbert	Sr
CB	3	DJ Pickett	Fr
CB	4	Mansoor Delane	Sr
DE	6	Patrick Payton	Sr
LB	7	Harold Perkins	Jr
CB	8	Ja'Keem Jackson	So
S	10	Dashawn Spears	So
CB	11	PJ Woodland	So
DE	12	Jimari Butler	GS
S	13	A. J. Haulcy	Sr
DE	14	CJ Jackson	Fr
LB	15	Jaiden Braker	Fr
DT	16	Ahmad Breaux	So
DE	17	Damien Shanklin	Fr
DE	19	Gabriel Reliford	So
CB	21	Michael Turner Jr.	Fr
S	22	Joel Rogers	Fr
CB	23	Aidan Anding	Fr
S	24	Jacob Bradford	Fr
S	25	Javien Toviano	Jr
S	27	Austin Ausberry	Jr
S	28	Jhase Thomas	Fr
CB	29	Wallace Foster IV	Fr
LB	30	Charles Ross II	Fr
S	31	CJ Jimcoily	Fr
LB	32	Keylan Moses	Fr
LB	33	West Weeks	GS
LB	35	Zach Weeks	Fr
CB	37	Craig Walton Jr.	So
S	39	Tyson Short	So
LB	40	Whit Weeks	Jr
CB	41	Justin Echols	Jr
LB	42	Davhon Keys	So
DE	44	Jack Pyburn	Sr
LB	46	Tylen Singleton	Fr
DE	48	Kolaj Cobbins	Fr
LB	49	Gabe Leonards	Sr
LB	50	Kenzel Kelly	GS
LB	52	Princeton Malbrue	Jr
LB	55	Jake Ibieta	So
DT	87	Joey August	So
DL	88	Bernard Gooden	Sr
DT	90	Jacobian Guillory	GS
DT	91	Walter Mathis Jr.	Fr
DT	92	Brandon Brown	Fr
DT	94	Zion Williams	Fr
DT	95	Shone Washington	Jr
DT	96	Dominic McKinley	So
DE	97	Dylan Carpenter	So
DT	99	Sydir Mitchell	So

Special teams

Pos.	#	Name	Class
K	32	Aeron Burrell	So
K	34	Damian Ramos	Sr
K	36	Aidan Corbello	So
K	45	Sean Perret	Fr
P	46	Badger Hargett	So
LS	49	Jonathan Ferguson	GS
LS	51	Silas Hall	Fr
P	90	Grant Chadwick	So

Head coach

- Brian Kelly

Coordinators/assistant coaches

- Frank Wilson – Associate head coach/running backs
- Blake Baker – Defensive coordinator/linebackers
- Joe Sloan – Offensive coordinator/quarterbacks
- Cortez Hankton – Co-offensive coordinator/wide receivers
- Alex Atkins – Tight ends/run game coordinator
- Brad Davis – Offensive line
- Jake Olsen – Safeties
- Kevin Peoples – Edge rushers
- Corey Raymond – Secondary
- Kyle Williams – Interior defensive line
- Jake Flint – Director of athletic development

Legend

- (C) Team captain
- (S) Suspended
- (I) Ineligible
- Injured
- Redshirt

Roster
Last update: July 31, 2025

== Game summaries ==
=== at No. 4 Clemson ===
No. 9 LSU Tigers (0–0) at No. 4 Clemson Tigers (0–0) – Game summary

Quarter	1	2	3	4	Total
No. 9 LSU	0	3	7	7	17
No. 4 Clemson	3	7	0	0	10

at Memorial Stadium • Clemson, SC

- Date: August 30
- Game time: 6:30 p.m. CDT
- Game weather: Temperature: 77 °F (25 °C) • Wind: SE 5 mph • Weather: Sunny
- Game attendance: 81,500
- Referee: Daniel Gautreaux
- TV announcers (ABC): Chris Fowler (play-by-play), Kirk Herbstreit (analyst), Holly Rowe, and Molly McGrath (sideline reporters)

Game information

First quarter

- CLEM – Nolan Hauser 42-yard field goal, 8:57. Clemson 3–0. Drive: 4 plays, 0 yards, 0:54.

Second quarter

- LSU – Damian Ramos 52-yard field goal, 10:53. Tied 3–3. Drive: 8 plays, 49 yards, 4:47.
- CLEM – Adam Randall 1-yard run (Nolan Hauser kick), 4:36. Clemson 10–3. Drive: 13 plays, 75 yards, 6:17.

Third quarter

- LSU – Caden Durham 2-yard run (Damian Ramos kick), 8:59. Tied 10–10. Drive: 8 plays, 69 yards, 3:48.

Fourth quarter

- LSU – Trey'Dez Green 8-yard pass from Garrett Nussmeier (Damian Ramos kick), 12:18. LSU 17–10. Drive: 11 plays, 73 yards, 5:51.

Statistics	LSU	CLEM
First downs	25	13
Plays–yards	70–354	58–261
Rushes–yards	31–108	20–31
Passing yards	248	230
Passing: comp–att–int	29–39–0	19–38–1
Turnovers	2	1
Time of possession	37:10	22:50

Team	Category	Player	Statistics
LSU	Passing	Garrett Nussmeier	28/38, 238 yards, TD
LSU	Rushing	Caden Durham	17 carries, 74 yards, TD
LSU	Receiving	Aaron Anderson	6 receptions, 99 yards
Clemson	Passing	Cade Klubnik	19/38, 230 yards, INT
Clemson	Rushing	Adam Randall	5 carries, 16 yards, TD
Clemson	Receiving	Bryant Wesco Jr.	4 receptions, 66 yards

=== Louisiana Tech ===
Louisiana Tech Bulldogs (1–0) at No. 3 LSU Tigers (1–0) – Game summary

Quarter	1	2	3	4	Total
Bulldogs	0	0	0	7	7
No. 3 Tigers	7	3	7	6	23

at Tiger Stadium • Baton Rouge, LA

- Date: September 6
- Game time: 6:30 p.m.CDT
- Game weather: Sunny, 90 °F (32 °C)
- Game attendance: 101,667
- Referee: Jason Autrey
- TV announcers (SECN+/ESPN+): Jay Alter (play-by-play), Rocky Boiman (analyst), and Tori Petry (sideline reporter)

Game information

First quarter

- LSU – Nic Anderson 7-yard pass from Garrett Nussmeier (Damian Ramos kick), 0:12. Tigers 7–0. Drive: 11 plays, 98 yards, 5:37.

Second quarter

- LSU – Damian Ramos 23-yard field goal, 6:24. Tigers 10–0. Drive: 13 plays, 85 yards, 5:07.

Third quarter

- LSU – Caden Durham 3-yard run (Damian Ramos kick), 1:58. Tigers 17–0. Drive: 6 plays, 33 yards, 3:16

Fourth quarter

- LSU – Damian Ramos 46-yard field goal, 11:14. Tigers 20–0. Drive: 11 plays, 38 yards, 4:36.
- LT – Devin Gandy 33-yard pass from Blake Baker (Drew Henderson kick), 4:02. Tigers 20–7. Drive: 13 plays, 74 yards, 4:46.
- LSU – Damian Ramos 19-yard field goal, 1:55. Tigers 23–7. Drive: 6 plays, 48 yards, 1:57.

Statistics	LT	LSU
First downs	12	27
Plays–yards	53–154	75–365
Rushes–yards	27–58	34–128
Passing yards	96	237
Passing: comp–att–int	15–26–0	26–41–1
Turnovers	0	1
Time of possession	23:08	36:52

Team	Category	Player	Statistics
Louisiana Tech	Passing	Trey Kukuk	12/18, 50 yards
Louisiana Tech	Rushing	Clay Thevenin	7 carries, 22 yards
Louisiana Tech	Receiving	Devin Gandy	1 reception, 33 yards, TD
LSU	Passing	Garrett Nussmeier	26/41, 237 yards, TD, INT
LSU	Rushing	Harlem Berry	6 carries, 56 yards
LSU	Receiving	Barion Brown	8 receptions, 84 yards

=== Florida (rivalry) ===
Florida Gators (1–1) at No. 3 LSU Tigers (2–0) – Game summary

Quarter	1	2	3	4	Total
Gators	3	7	0	0	10
No. 3 Tigers	0	13	7	0	20

at Tiger Stadium • Baton Rouge, LA

- Date: September 13
- Game time: 6:30 p.m. CDT
- Game weather: Sunny • Temperature: 91 °F (33 °C) • Wind: NE 5 mph
- Game attendance: 102,158
- Referee: Jeff Heaser
- TV announcers (ABC): Sean McDonough (play-by-play), Greg McElroy (analyst), and Molly McGrath (sideline reporter)

Game information

First quarter

- (11:34) FLA – Trey Smack 45-yard field goal (Drive: 7 plays, 34 yards, 2:27; Florida 3–0)

Second quarter

- (14:56) LSU – Damian Ramos 47-yard field goal (Drive: 6 plays, 14 yards, 2:49; Tied 3–3)
- (7:33) LSU – Zavion Thomas 23-yard pass from Garrett Nussmeier, Damian Ramos kick (Drive: 10 plays, 76 yards, 4:03; LSU 10–3)
- (3:25) FLA – Aidan Mizell 10-yard pass from DJ Lagway, Trey Smack kick (Drive: 10 plays, 75 yards, 4:08; Tied 10–10)
- (0:00) LSU – Damian Ramos 45-yard field goal (Drive: 3 plays, 12 yards, 0:23; LSU 13–10)

Third quarter

- (8:08) LSU – Dashawn Spears 58-yard interception return, Damian Ramos kick (LSU 20–10)

Fourth quarter

No scoring plays

Statistics	FLA	LSU
First downs	23	10
Plays–yards	76–366	52–316
Rushes–yards	27–79	25–96
Passing yards	287	220
Passing: comp–att–int	33–49–5	15–27–1
Turnovers	5	1
Time of possession	37:46	22:14

Team	Category	Player	Statistics
Florida	Passing	DJ Lagway	33/49, 287 yards, TD, 5 INT
Florida	Rushing	Jadan Baugh	10 carries, 46 yards
Florida	Receiving	Vernell Brown III	8 receptions, 62 yards
LSU	Passing	Garrett Nussmeier	15/27, 220 yards, TD, INT
LSU	Rushing	Caden Durham	15 carries, 93 yards
LSU	Receiving	Aaron Anderson	4 receptions, 75 yards

=== Southeastern Louisiana (FCS) ===
Southeastern Louisiana Lions (FCS) (2–1) at No. 3 LSU Tigers (3–0) – Game summary

Quarter	1	2	3	4	Total
Lions (FCS)	0	0	7	3	10
No. 3 Tigers	7	28	7	14	56

at Tiger Stadium • Baton Rouge, LA

- Date: September 20
- Game time: 6:45 p.m. CDT
- Game weather: Sunny • Temperature: 87 °F (31 °C) • Wind: S 7 mph
- Game attendance: 102,219
- Referee: Kyle Olson
- TV announcers (SECN): Tom Hart (play-by-play), Jordan Rodgers (analyst), and Cole Cubelic (sideline reporter)

Game information

First quarter

- (5:08) LSU – Garrett Nussmeier 1-yard run, Damian Ramos kick (Drive: 13 plays, 45 yards, 5:18; LSU 7–0)

Second quarter

- (13:12) LSU – Ju'Juan Johnson 2-yard run, Damian Ramos kick (Drive: 7 plays, 44 yards, 2:58; LSU 14–0)
- (8:19) LSU – Ju'Juan Johnson 10-yard run, Damian Ramos kick (Drive: 7 plays, 74 yards, 3:14; LSU 21–0)
- (2:06) LSU – Barion Brown 17-yard pass from Garrett Nussmeier, Damian Ramos kick (Drive: 8 plays, 57 yards, 3:50; LSU 28–0)
- (0:15) LSU – Zavion Thomas 9-yard pass from Garrett Nussmeier, Damian Ramos kick (Drive: 8 plays, 56 yards, 1:25; LSU 35–0)

Third quarter

- (9:28) LSU – Bauer Sharp 23-yard pass from Garrett Nussmeier, Damian Ramos kick (Drive: 7 plays, 87 yards, 3:17; LSU 42–0)
- (6:07) SLU – Deantre Jackson 14-yard pass from Carson Camp, Guillermo Garcia Rodriguez kick (Drive: 8 plays, 75 yards, 3:21; LSU 42–7)

Fourth quarter

- (13:54) LSU – Michael Van Buren Jr. 1-yard run, Damian Ramos kick (Drive: 16 plays, 81 yards, 7:05; LSU 49–7)
- (8:11) LSU – Kyle Parker 27-yard pass from Michael Van Buren Jr., Damian Ramos kick (Drive: 6 plays, 58 yards, 3:30; LSU 56–7)
- (2:16) SLU – Guillermo Garcia Rodriguez 37-yard field goal (Drive: 11 plays, 55 yards, 5:55; LSU 56–10)

Statistics	SELA	LSU
First downs	10	32
Plays–yards	47–204	78–530
Rushes–yards	26–88	35–135
Passing yards	116	395
Passing: comp–att–int	11–21–0	35–43–0
Turnovers	0	0
Time of possession	25:16	34:44

Team	Category	Player	Statistics
Southeastern Louisiana	Passing	Carson Camp	8/13, 87 yards, TD
Southeastern Louisiana	Rushing	Calvin Smith Jr.	2 carries, 40 yards
Southeastern Louisiana	Receiving	Deantre Jackson	3 receptions, 36 yards, TD
LSU	Passing	Garrett Nussmeier	25/31, 273 yards, 3 TD
LSU	Rushing	Ju'Juan Johnson	8 carries, 43 yards, 2 TD
LSU	Receiving	Bauer Sharp	5 receptions, 73 yards, TD

=== at No. 13 Ole Miss (Magnolia Bowl) ===
No. 4 LSU Tigers (4–0) at No. 13 Ole Miss Rebels (4–0) – Game summary

Quarter	1	2	3	4	Total
No. 4 Tigers	7	0	6	6	19
No. 13 Rebels	3	14	0	7	24

at Vaught–Hemingway Stadium • Oxford, MS

- Date: September 27
- Game time: 2:30 p.m. CDT
- Game weather: Sunny • Temperature: 82 °F (28 °C) • Wind: NNW at 8 miles per hour (13 km/h)
- Game attendance: 67,737
- Referee: Ken Williamson
- TV announcers (ABC): Sean McDonough (play-by-play), Greg McElroy (analyst), and Molly McGrath (sideline reporter)

Game information

First quarter

- (9:10) LSU – Nic Anderson 7-yard pass from Garrett Nussmeier, Damian Ramos kick (Drive: 5 plays, 67 yards, 2:36; LSU 7–0)
- (1:40) MISS – Lucas Carneiro 25-yard field goal (Drive: 18 plays, 83 yards, 7:25; LSU 7–3)

Second quarter

- (5:09) MISS – Kewan Lacy 15-yard run, Lucas Carneiro kick (Drive: 5 plays, 70 yards, 1:40; Ole Miss 10–7)
- (0:13) MISS – Cayden Lee 2-yard pass from Trinidad Chambliss, Lucas Carneiro kick (Drive: 9 plays, 69 yards, 2:03; Ole Miss 17–7)

Third quarter

- (6:02) LSU – Damian Ramos 39-yard field goal (Drive: 8 plays, 33 yards, 4:35; Ole Miss 17–10)
- (0:58) LSU – Damian Ramos 48-yard field goal (Drive: 6 plays, 16 yards, 2:14; Ole Miss 17–13)

Fourth quarter

- (11:08) MISS – Logan Diggs 6-yard run, Lucas Carneiro kick (Drive: 11 plays, 75 yards, 4:50; Ole Miss 24–13)
- (5:04) LSU – Harlem Berry 6-yard run (Drive: 15 plays, 80 yards, 5:58; Ole Miss 24–19)

Statistics	LSU	MISS
First downs	16	28
Plays–yards	56–256	84–484
Rushes–yards	21–59	42–170
Passing yards	197	314
Passing: comp–att–int	21–34–1	23–39–1
Turnovers	1	2
Time of possession	27:38	32:22

Team	Category	Player	Statistics
LSU	Passing	Garrett Nussmeier	21/34, 197 yards, TD, INT
LSU	Rushing	Harlem Berry	7 carries, 22 yards, TD
LSU	Receiving	Zavion Thomas	3 receptions, 63 yards
Ole Miss	Passing	Trinidad Chambliss	23/39, 314 yards, TD, INT
Ole Miss	Rushing	Kewan Lacy	23 carries, 87 yards, TD
Ole Miss	Receiving	Cayden Lee	4 receptions, 70 yards, TD

=== South Carolina ===
South Carolina Gamecocks (3–2) at No. 11 LSU Tigers (4–1) – Game summary

Quarter	1	2	3	4	Total
Gamecocks	7	0	3	0	10
No. 11 Tigers	3	7	7	3	20

at Tiger Stadium • Baton Rouge, LA

- Date: October 11
- Game time: 2:45 p.m. CDT
- Game weather: Clear • Temperature: 77 °F (25 °C) • Wind: NE at 2 miles per hour (3.2 km/h)
- Game attendance: 101,921
- Referee: Steve Marlowe
- TV announcers (SECN): Tom Hart (play-by-play), Jordan Rodgers (analyst), and Cole Cubelic (sideline reporter)

Game information

First quarter

- (11:53) LSU – Damian Ramos 28-yard field goal (Drive: 4 plays, 7 yards, 1:23; LSU 3–0)
- (0:25) SC – Matt Fuller 72-yard run, William Joyce kick (Drive: 3 plays, 80 yards, 1:26; South Carolina 7–3)

Second quarter

- (13:01) LSU – Trey'Dez Green 6-yard pass from Garrett Nussmeier, Damian Ramos kick (Drive: 6 plays, 72 yards, 2:19; LSU 10–7)
- (8:39) SC – William Joyce 47-yard field goal (Drive: 11 plays, 46 yards, 6:21; Tied 10–10)

Third quarter

- (6:38) LSU – Kyle Parker 43-yard pass from Garrett Nussmeier, Damian Ramos kick (Drive: 4 plays, 75 yards, 2:01; LSU 17–10)

Fourth quarter

- (1:47) LSU – Damian Ramos 22-yard field goal (Drive: 10 plays, 64 yards, 3:56; LSU 20–10)

Statistics	SC	LSU
First downs	20	22
Plays–yards	72–317	63–420
Rushes–yards	45–193	30–166
Passing yards	124	254
Passing: comp–att–int	15–27–1	20–33–2
Turnovers	2	3
Time of possession	31:45	28:15

Team	Category	Player	Statistics
South Carolina	Passing	LaNorris Sellers	15/27, 124 yards, INT
South Carolina	Rushing	Matt Fuller	7 carries, 83 yards, TD
South Carolina	Receiving	Nyck Harbor	2 receptions, 36 yards
LSU	Passing	Garrett Nussmeier	20/33, 254 yards, 2 TD, 2 INT
LSU	Rushing	Caden Durham	15 carries, 70 yards
LSU	Receiving	Trey'Dez Green	8 receptions, 119 yards, TD

=== at No. 17 Vanderbilt ===
No. 10 LSU Tigers (5–1) at No. 17 Vanderbilt Commodores (5–1) – Game summary

Quarter	1	2	3	4	Total
No. 10 Tigers	3	10	8	3	24
No. 17 Commodores	7	10	14	0	31

at FirstBank Stadium • Nashville, TN

- Date: October 18
- Game time: 11:00 a.m. CDT
- Game weather: Clear • Wind: SW at 10 miles per hour (16 km/h)
- Game attendance: 35,000
- Referee: David Smith
- TV announcers (ABC): Joe Tessitore (play-by-play), Jesse Palmer (analyst), and Katie George (sideline reporter)

Game information

First quarter

- (9:32) LSU – Damian Ramos 48-yard field goal (Drive: 12 plays, 44 yards, 5:28; LSU 3–0)
- (3:38) VAN – Diego Pavia 1-yard run, Brock Taylor kick (Drive: 9 plays, 57 yards, 5:44; Vanderbilt 7–3)

Second quarter

- (14:50) LSU – Trey'Dez Green 24-yard pass from Garrett Nussmeier, Damian Ramos kick (Drive: 8 plays, 75 yards, 3:48; LSU 10–7)
- (5:52) VAN – Sedrick Alexander 1-yard run, Brock Taylor kick (Drive: 14 plays, 75 yards, 8:58; Vanderbilt 14–10)
- (0:45) LSU – Damian Ramos 42-yard field goal (Drive: 6 plays, 11 yards, 0:58; Vanderbilt 14–13)
- (0:02) VAN – Brock Taylor 46-yard field goal (Drive: 7 plays, 50 yards, 0:37; Vanderbilt 17–13)

Third quarter

- (9:03) VAN – Cole Spence 1-yard pass from Diego Pavia, Brock Taylor kick (Drive: 10 plays, 75 yards, 5:57; Vanderbilt 24–13)
- (6:52) LSU – Zavion Thomas 62-yard pass from Garrett Nussmeier, Trey'Dez Green pass (Drive: 5 plays, 92 yards, 2:03; Vanderbilt 24–21)
- (0:27) VAN – Diego Pavia 21-yard run, Brock Taylor kick (Drive: 10 plays, 75 yards, 6:25; Vanderbilt 31–21)

Fourth quarter

- (11:39) LSU – Damian Ramos 23-yard field goal (Drive: 9 plays, 69 yards, 3:48; Vanderbilt 31–24)

Statistics	LSU	VAN
First downs	14	20
Plays–yards	49–325	67–399
Rushes–yards	21–100	45–239
Passing yards	225	160
Passing: comp–att–int	19–28–0	14–22–0
Turnovers	0	0
Time of possession	23:29	36:31

Team	Category	Player	Statistics
LSU	Passing	Garrett Nussmeier	19/28, 225 yards, 2 TD
LSU	Rushing	Caden Durham	7 carries, 59 yards
LSU	Receiving	Zavion Thomas	4 receptions, 75 yards, TD
Vanderbilt	Passing	Diego Pavia	14/22, 160 yards, TD
Vanderbilt	Rushing	Diego Pavia	17 carries, 86 yards, 2 TD
Vanderbilt	Receiving	Cole Spence	5 receptions, 56 yards, TD

=== No. 3 Texas A&M (rivalry) ===
No. 3 Texas A&M Aggies (7–0) at No. 20 LSU Tigers (5–2) – Game summary

Quarter	1	2	3	4	Total
No. 3 Aggies	14	0	21	14	49
No. 20 Tigers	7	11	0	7	25

at Tiger Stadium • Baton Rouge, LA

- Date: October 25
- Game time: 6:30 p.m. CDT
- Game weather: Cloudy, 71°, Wind SE 8mph
- Game attendance: 101,924
- Referee: James Carter
- TV announcers (ABC): Chris Fowler (play-by-play), Kirk Herbstreit (analyst), and Holly Rowe (sideline reporter)

Game information

First quarter

- TA&M – Marcel Reed 41-yard run (Randy Bond kick), 10:10. Aggies 7–0. Drive: 6 plays, 68 yards, 2:37.
- LSU – Trey'Dez Green 5-yard pass from Garrett Nussmeier (Damian Ramos kick), 5:38. Tied 7–7. Drive: 8 plays, 74 yards, 4:32.
- TA&M – KC Concepcion 15-yard pass from Marcel Reed (Randy Bond kick), 0:40. Aggies 14–7. Drive: 10 plays, 75 yards, 4:58.

Second quarter

- LSU – Punt blocked by J. Thomas, out of bounds for Safety, 12:13. Aggies 14–9.
- LSU – Harlem Berry 7-yard run (Damian Ramos kick failed), 3:09. Tigers 15–14. Drive: 8 plays, 75 yards, 3:47.
- LSU – Damian Ramos 30-yard field goal, 0:20. Tigers 18–14. Drive: 6 plays, 36 yards, 0:54.

Third quarter

- TA&M – Marcel Reed 5-yard run (Randy Bond kick), 10:41. Aggies 21–18. Drive: 9 plays, 56 yards, 4:19.
- TA&M – KC Concepcion 79-yard punt return (Randy Bond kick), 8:47. Aggies 28–18.
- TA&M – Jamarion Morrow 24-yard pass from Marcel Reed (Randy Bond kick), 4:02. Aggies 35–18. Drive: 4 plays, 50 yards, 1:40.

Fourth quarter

- TA&M – Nate Boerkircher 1-yard run (Randy Bond kick), 14:15. Aggies 42–18. Drive: 6 plays, 33 yards, 3:22.
- TA&M – Jamarion Morrow 11-yard run (Randy Bond kick), 6:12. Aggies 49–18. Drive: 5 plays, 29 yards, 2:35.
- LSU – Kyle Parker 12-yard pass from Michael Van Buren Jr. (Damian Ramos kick), 0:59. Aggies 49–25. Drive: 12 plays, 75 yards, 5:13.

Statistics	TA&M	LSU
First downs	24	18
Plays–yards	61-426	66-278
Rushes–yards	40-224	27-60
Passing yards	202	218
Passing: comp–att–int	12-21-2	25–39–0
Turnovers	2	0
Time of possession	30:12	29:48

Team	Category	Player	Statistics
Texas A&M	Passing	Marcel Reed	12/21, 202 yards, 2 TD, 2 INT
Texas A&M	Rushing	Marcel Reed	13 carries, 108 yards, 2 TD
Texas A&M	Receiving	Ashton Bethel-Roman	1 reception, 47 yards
LSU	Passing	Garrett Nussmeier	22/35, 168 yards, TD
LSU	Rushing	Harlem Berry	9 carries, 59 yards, TD
LSU	Receiving	Barion Brown	4 receptions, 60 yards

=== at No. 4 Alabama (rivalry) ===
LSU Tigers (5–3) at No. 4 Alabama Crimson Tide (7–1) – Game summary

Quarter	1	2	3	4	Total
Tigers	0	3	3	3	9
No. 4 Crimson Tide	3	14	0	3	20

at Bryant–Denny Stadium • Tuscaloosa, AL

- Date: November 8
- Game time: 6:30 p.m. CST
- Game weather: Sunny, 67 °F (19 °C)
- Game attendance: 100,077
- Referee: Matt Loeffler
- TV announcers (ABC): Sean McDonough (play-by-play), Greg McElroy (analyst), and Molly McGrath (sideline)

Game information

First quarter

- ALA - Conor Talty 45-yard field goal, 1:20. Crimson Tide 3-0. Drive: 4 plays, -2 yards, 1:00.

Second quarter

- LSU - Damian Ramos 37-yard field goal, 12:27. Tied 3-3. Drive: 9 plays, 48 yards, 3:53.
- ALA - Daniel Hill 4-yard run (Conor Talty kick), 9:25. Crimson Tide 10-3. Drive: 7 plays, 75 yards, 3:02.
- ALA - Ryan Williams 13-yard pass from Ty Simpson (Conor Talty kick), 0:22. Crimson Tide 17-3. Drive: 3 plays, 66 yards, 0:34.

Third quarter

- LSU - Damian Ramos 44-yard field goal, 8:54. Crimson Tide 17-6. Drive: 11 plays, 48 yards, 6:06.

Fourth quarter

- LSU - Damian Ramos 37-yard field goal, 10:28. Crimson Tide 17-9. Drive: 9 plays, 18 yards, 4:25.
- ALA - Conor Talty 44-yard field goal, 4:25. Crimson Tide 20-9. Drive: 6 plays, 29 yards, 2:46.

Statistics	LSU	ALA
First downs	13	17
Plays–yards	58–232	62–344
Rushes–yards	26–59	26–56
Passing yards	173	288
Passing: comp–att–int	23–32–0	22–36–0
Turnovers	2	1
Time of possession	31:49	28:11

Team	Category	Player	Statistics
LSU	Passing	Garrett Nussmeier	18/21, 121 yards
LSU	Rushing	Harlem Berry	12 carries, 66 yards
LSU	Receiving	Zavion Thomas	5 receptions, 49 yards
Alabama	Passing	Ty Simpson	21/35, 277 yards, TD
Alabama	Rushing	Daniel Hill	7 carries, 21 yards, TD
Alabama	Receiving	Germie Bernard	3 receptions, 79 yards

=== Arkansas (Battle for the Boot) ===
Arkansas Razorbacks (2–7) at LSU Tigers (5–4) – Game summary

Quarter	1	2	3	4	Total
Razorbacks	14	0	8	0	22
Tigers	0	16	0	7	23

at Tiger Stadium • Baton Rouge, LA

- Date: November 15
- Game time: 11:45 a.m. CST
- Game weather:
- Game attendance: 100,212
- Referee: Kyle Olson
- TV announcers (SEC Network): Tom Hart (play-by-play), Jordan Rodgers (analyst), Cole Cubelic (sideline)

Game information

First quarter

- (10:58) ARK – Caleb Wooden 16-yard blocked punt return (Scott Starzyk kick) (Drive: 3 plays, 5 yards, 1:29; Arkansas 7–0)
- (4:06) ARK – Taylen Green 11-yard run (Scott Starzyk kick) (Drive: 11 plays, 52 yards, 5:50; Arkansas 14–0)

Second quarter

- (14:54) LSU – Caden Durham 27-yard run (Damian Ramos kick) (Drive: 9 plays, 75 yards, 4:12; Arkansas 14–7)
- (7:02) LSU – Damian Ramos 50-yard field goal (Drive: 10 plays, 49 yards, 5:55; Arkansas 14–10)
- (5:08) LSU – Damian Ramos 42-yard field goal (Drive: 4 plays, 5 yards, 1:47; Arkansas 14–13)
- (0:03) LSU – Damian Ramos 42-yard field goal (Drive: 5 plays, 55 yards, 0:30; LSU 16–14)

Third quarter

- (4:02) ARK – Mike Washington Jr. 9-yard run (Taylen Green run for two-point conversion) (Drive: 5 plays, 39 yards, 1:58; Arkansas 22–16)

Fourth quarter

- (7:53) LSU – Bauer Sharp 12-yard pass from Michael Van Buren Jr. (Damian Ramos kick) (Drive: 12 plays, 92 yards, 6:17; LSU 23–22)

Statistics	ARK	LSU
First downs	16	21
Plays–yards	70–340	54–390
Rushes–yards	35–175	37–155
Passing yards	165	221
Passing: comp–att–int	11–19–2	21–31–0
Turnovers	2	0
Time of possession	25:15	34:45

Team	Category	Player	Statistics
Arkansas	Passing	Taylen Green	11/19, 165 yards, 2 INT
Arkansas	Rushing	Mike Washington Jr.	13 carries, 85 yards, TD
Arkansas	Receiving	Raylen Sharpe	4 receptions, 65 yards
LSU	Passing	Michael Van Buren Jr.	21/31, 221 yards, TD
LSU	Rushing	Caden Durham	12 carries, 65 yards, TD
LSU	Receiving	Bauer Sharp	1 reception, 12 yards, TD

=== Western Kentucky ===
Western Kentucky Hilltoppers (8-2) at LSU Tigers (6-4) – Game summary

Quarter	1	2	3	4	Total
Hilltoppers	3	0	0	7	10
Tigers	0	7	3	3	13

at Tiger Stadium • Baton Rouge, LA

- Date: November 22
- Game time: 6:45 p.m. CST
- Game weather:
- Game attendance: 100,923
- Referee: Steve Marlowe
- TV announcers (SECN): Tom Hart (play-by-play), Jordan Rodgers (analyst) and Cole Cubelic (sideline)

Game information

First quarter

- (11:43) WKU - John Cannon 36-yard field goal (Drive: 9 plays, 57 yards, 3:17; Western Kentucky 3-0)

Second quarter

- (1:32) LSU - Trey'Dez Green 11-yard pass from Michael Van Buren Jr. (Damian Ramos kick) (Drive: 8 plays, 62 yards, 1:43; LSU 7-3)

Third quarter

- (5:55) LSU - Damian Ramos 18-yard field goal (Drive: 6 plays, 21 yards, 2:30; LSU 10-3)

Fourth quarter

- (11:15) LSU - Damian Ramos 29-yard field goal (Drive: 10 plays, 40 yards, 4:55; LSU 13-3)
- (1:05) WKU - Dylan Flowers 71-yard fumble return (John Cannon kick) (Drive: 3 plays, 8 yards, 1:25; LSU 13-10)

Statistics	WKU	LSU
First downs	14	20
Plays–yards	75-152	81-328
Rushes–yards	24-22	37-126
Passing yards	130	202
Passing: comp–att–int	21-41-2	25-42-1
Turnovers	2	2
Time of possession	24:06	35:54

Team	Category	Player	Statistics
Western Kentucky	Passing	Rodney Tisdale Jr.	20/39, 128 yards, 2 INT
Western Kentucky	Rushing	Marvis Parrish	7 carries, 32 yards
Western Kentucky	Receiving	K.D. Hutchinson	8 receptions, 40 yards
LSU	Passing	Michael Van Buren Jr.	25/42, 202 yards, TD, INT
LSU	Rushing	Harlem Berry	18 carries, 80 yards
LSU	Receiving	Zavion Thomas	6 receptions, 47 yards

=== at Oklahoma ===
LSU Tigers (7–4) at No. 8 Oklahoma Sooners (9–2) – Game summary

Quarter	1	2	3	4	Total
Tigers	0	3	7	3	13
No. 8 Sooners	3	0	7	7	17

at Gaylord Family Oklahoma Memorial Stadium • Norman, OK

- Date: November 29
- Game time: 2:30 p.m. CST
- Game weather: Sunny • Temperature: 54 °F (12 °C)
- Game attendance: 83,734
- Referee: Kyle Olson
- TV announcers (ABC): Mark Jones (play-by-play), Roddy Jones (analyst) and Quint Kessenich (sideline)

Game information

First quarter

- (4:31) OU – Tate Sandell 38-yard field goal (Drive: 11 plays, 53 yards, 5:01; OU 3–0)

Second quarter

- (13:35) LSU – Damian Ramos 25-yard field goal (Drive: 6 plays, 42 yards, 1:53; Tied 3–3)

Third quarter

- (11:21) LSU – Zavion Thomas 1-yard pass from Michael Van Buren Jr., Damian Ramos kick (Drive: 4 plays, 33 yards, 2:03; LSU 10–3)
- (1:47) OU – Deion Burks 45-yard pass from John Mateer, Tate Sandell kick (Drive: 2 plays, 45 yards, 0:43; Tied 10–10)

Fourth quarter

- (7:56) LSU – Damian Ramos 43-yard field goal (Drive: 8 plays, 42 yards, 4:38; LSU 13–10)
- (4:16) OU – Isaiah Sategna III 58-yard pass from John Mateer, Tate Sandell kick (Drive: 3 plays, 84 yards, 0:48; OU 17–13)

Statistics	LSU	OU
First downs	9	14
Plays–yards	55–198	66–393
Rushes–yards	29–85	28–75
Passing yards	113	318
Passing: comp–att–int	15–26–1	23–38–3
Turnovers	1	3
Time of possession	29:19	30:41

Team	Category	Player	Statistics
LSU	Passing	Michael Van Buren Jr.	14/25, 96 yards, TD, INT
LSU	Rushing	Caden Durham	6 carries, 42 yards
LSU	Receiving	Zavion Thomas	3 receptions, 30 yards, TD
Oklahoma	Passing	John Mateer	23/38, 318 yards, 2 TD, 3 INT
Oklahoma	Rushing	Tory Blaylock	11 carries, 42 yards
Oklahoma	Receiving	Isaiah Sategna III	9 receptions, 121 yards, TD

=== vs. No. 21 Houston (Texas Bowl) ===
2025 Kinder's Texas Bowl
LSU Tigers (7–5) vs. No. 21 Houston Cougars (9–3) – Game summary

Quarter	1	2	3	4	Total
Tigers	14	0	7	14	35
No. 21 Cougars	7	14	7	10	38

at NRG Stadium • Houston, TX

- Date: December 27
- Game time: 8:15 p.m. CST
- Game attendance: 63,867
- Referee: Jason Nickleby
- TV announcers (ESPN): Tom Hart (play-by-play), Cole Cubelic (analyst) and Ian Fitzsimmons (sideline)

Game information

First quarter

- LSU – Barion Brown 99-yard kickoff return (Damian Ramos kick), 14:46. Tigers 7–0.
- LSU – Trey'Dez Green 23-yard pass from Michael Van Buren Jr. (Damian Ramos kick), 10:48. Tigers 14–0. Drive: 4 plays, 60 yards, 1:26.
- HOU – Amare Thomas 8-yard pass from Conner Weigman (Ethan Sanchez kick), 6:08. Tigers 14–7. Drive: 9 plays, 75 yards, 4:40.

Second quarter

- HOU – Amare Thomas 4-yard pass from Conner Weigman (Ethan Sanchez kick), 11:05. Tied 14–14. Drive: 14 plays, 73 yards, 6:59.
- HOU – Tanner Koziol 7-yard pass from Conner Weigman (Ethan Sanchez kick), 0:04. Cougars 21–14. Drive: 11 plays, 90 yards, 1:23.

Third quarter

- LSU – Trey'Dez Green 4-yard pass from Michael Van Buren Jr. (Damian Ramos kick), 9:31. Tied 21–21. Drive: 7 plays, 73 yards, 4:00.
- HOU – Traville Frederick Jr. 2-yard pass from Conner Weigman (Ethan Sanchez kick), 4:42. Cougars 28–21. Drive: 8 plays, 75 yards, 4:49.

Fourth quarter

- LSU – Kyle Parker 6-yard pass from Michael Van Buren Jr. (Damian Ramos Kick), 14:54. Tied 28–28. Drive: 5 plays, 72 yards, 1:35.
- HOU – Ethan Sanchez 25-yard field goal, 7:42. Cougars 31–28. Drive: 13 plays, 72 yards, 7:06.
- HOU – Dean Connors 20-yard run (Ethan Sanchez kick), 2:23. Cougars 38–28. Drive: 8 plays, 81 yards, 4:27.
- LSU – Zavion Thomas 3-yard run (Damian Ramos kick), 1:15. Cougars 38–35. Drive: 8 plays, 63 yards, 1:07.

Statistics	LSU	HOU
First downs	17	32
Plays–yards	50-344	82-437
Rushes–yards	24-77	45-207
Passing yards	267	230
Passing: comp–att–int	16-26-0	28-37-0
Turnovers	1	0
Time of possession	21:28	38:32

Team	Category	Player	Statistics
LSU	Passing	Michael Van Buren Jr.	16/26, 267 yards, 3 TD
LSU	Rushing	Harlem Berry	3 carries, 45 yards
LSU	Receiving	Trey'Dez Green	4 receptions, 80 yards, 2 TD
Houston	Passing	Conner Weigman	28/37, 230 yards, 4 TD
Houston	Rushing	Dean Connors	16 carries, 126 yards, TD
Houston	Receiving	Tanner Koziol	9 receptions, 76 yards, TD
