= 2024 LSU Tigers football team =

American college football season

2024 LSU Tigers football

Texas Bowl champion

Texas Bowl, W 44–31 vs. Baylor
- Conference: Southeastern Conference
- Record: 9–4 (5–3 SEC)
- Head coach: Brian Kelly (3rd season)
- Offensive coordinator: Joe Sloan (1st season)
- Co-offensive coordinator: Cortez Hankton (1st season)
- Offensive scheme: Multiple
- Defensive coordinator: Blake Baker (1st season)
- Base defense: 4–3
- Home stadium: Tiger Stadium

2024 Southeastern Conference football standings
	Conf.			Overall
Team	W		L	W		L
No. 4 Texas y^	7	–	1	13	–	3
No. 6 Georgia y$^	6	–	2	11	–	3
No. 9 Tennessee ^	6	–	2	10	–	3
No. 22 Missouri	5	–	3	10	–	3
No. 11 Ole Miss	5	–	3	10	–	3
No. 17 Alabama	5	–	3	9	–	4
No. 19 South Carolina	5	–	3	9	–	4
LSU	5	–	3	9	–	4
Texas A&M	5	–	3	8	–	5
Florida	4	–	4	8	–	5
Arkansas	3	–	5	7	–	6
Vanderbilt	3	–	5	7	–	6
Oklahoma	2	–	6	6	–	7
Auburn	2	–	6	5	–	7
Kentucky	1	–	7	4	–	8
Mississippi State	0	–	8	2	–	10
Championship: Georgia 22, Texas 19 ^{OT}
^ – College Football Playoff participant; $ – Conference champion; y – Championship game participant; Rankings from AP Poll

The 2024 LSU Tigers football team represented Louisiana State University (LSU) as a member of the Southeastern Conference (SEC) during the 2024 NCAA Division I FBS football season. The Tigers were led by Brian Kelly who was in his third year as LSU's head coach. The Tigers played their home games at Tiger Stadium located in Baton Rouge, Louisiana.

== Offseason ==
On December 27, 2023, offensive coordinator Mike Denbrock was announced as the new offensive coordinator at Notre Dame after two seasons at LSU.

On January 3, 2024, Kelly announced that LSU would part ways with defensive coordinator Matt House, cornerbacks coach Robert Steeples, safeties coach Kerry Cooks, and defensive line coach Jimmy Lindsey prior to the 2024 season.

On January 5, 2024, Missouri defensive coordinator Blake Baker was hired by LSU to become their new defensive coordinator after two seasons at Missouri, replacing House. Baker was previously the linebackers coach at LSU in 2021 prior to his hiring by Missouri.

== Schedule ==
LSU and the SEC announced the 2024 football schedule on December 13, 2023. The Tigers did not play Auburn for the first time since 1991 and Mississippi State for the first time since 1943, when the latter did not field a team during World War II, and the first time in a season when both teams fielded a team since 1925.

Date	Time	Opponent	Rank	Site	TV	Result	Attendance
September 1	6:30 p.m.	vs. No. 23 USC*	No. 13	Allegiant Stadium; Paradise, NV (Vegas Kickoff Classic)	ABC	L 20–27	63,969
September 7	6:30 p.m.	No. 22 (FCS) Nicholls*	No. 18	Tiger Stadium; Baton Rouge, LA	SECN+/ESPN+	W 44–21	100,242
September 14	11:00 a.m.	at South Carolina	No. 16	Williams–Brice Stadium; Columbia, SC (College GameDay)	ABC	W 36–33	79,531
September 21	2:30 p.m.	UCLA*	No. 16	Tiger Stadium; Baton Rouge, LA (SEC Nation)	ABC	W 34–17	100,315
September 28	6:45 p.m.	South Alabama*	No. 14	Tiger Stadium; Baton Rouge, LA	SECN	W 42–10	102,143
October 12	6:30 p.m.	No. 9 Ole Miss	No. 13	Tiger Stadium; Baton Rouge, LA (Magnolia Bowl)	ABC	W 29–26 ^{OT}	102,212
October 19	6:00 p.m.	at Arkansas	No. 8	Donald W. Reynolds Razorback Stadium; Fayetteville, AR (Battle for the Golden Boot)	ESPN	W 34–10	75,893
October 26	6:30 p.m.	at No. 14 Texas A&M	No. 8	Kyle Field; College Station, TX (rivalry)	ABC	L 23–38	108,852
November 9	6:30 p.m.	No. 11 Alabama	No. 15	Tiger Stadium; Baton Rouge, LA (rivalry, College Gameday)	ABC	L 13–42	102,283
November 16	2:30 p.m.	at Florida	No. 22	Ben Hill Griffin Stadium; Gainesville, FL (rivalry)	ABC	L 16–27	90,067
November 23	6:45 p.m.	Vanderbilt		Tiger Stadium; Baton Rouge, LA	SECN	W 24–17	102,086
November 30	6:00 p.m.	Oklahoma		Tiger Stadium; Baton Rouge, LA	ESPN	W 37–17	99,364
December 31	2:30 p.m.	vs. Baylor*		NRG Stadium; Houston, TX (Texas Bowl)	ESPN	W 44–31	59,940
*Non-conference game; Rankings from AP Poll (and CFP Rankings, after November 5) - Released prior to game; All times are in Central time

== Personnel ==
=== Roster ===
2024 LSU Tigers football team roster
Players
Coaches
Offense

Pos.	#	Name	Class
WR	0	Zavion Thomas	Jr
WR	1	Aaron Anderson	So
WR	2	Kyren Lacy	Sr
WR	3	Chris Hilton Jr.	Jr
WR	4	C. J. Daniels	GS
WR	6	Shelton Sampson Jr.	Fr
RB	8	Ju'Juan Johnson	Fr
QB	10	Rickie Collins	Fr
WR	12	Kyle Parker	Fr
QB	13	Garrett Nussmeier	Jr
TE	14	Trey'Dez Green	Fr
QB	15	AJ Swann	Jr
QB	16	Colin Hurley	Fr
WR	17	Jelani Watkins	Fr
RB	18	Josh Williams	GS
WR	19	Javen Nicholas	So
QB	21	Knox Dyson	Fr
RB	22	John Emery Jr.	GS
WR	24	Landon Ibieta	So
RB	25	Trey Holly	Fr
WR	26	Cowinn Helaire	So
RB	28	Kaleb Jackson	So
RB	29	Caden Durham	Fr
RB	30	Malachi Lane	Jr
RB	32	Joseph Ebun	Fr
RB	33	DK Kency Jr.	Fr
RB	43	Ty'son Edwards	GS
TE	45	GiVanni Peterson	Jr
OL	50	Emery Jones Jr.	Jr
OL	52	Kobe Roberts	Sr
OL	54	Aaron McDaniel	Sr
OL	55	Khayree Lee Jr.	Fr
OL	65	Paul Mubenga	Fr
OT	66	Will Campbell	Jr
OL	70	Miles Frazier	Sr
OL	71	Tyree Adams	Fr
OL	72	Garrett Dellinger	Sr
OT	73	Ethan Calloway	Fr
OL	74	Braden Augustus	Fr
OT	75	Weston Davis	Fr
OL	76	Christian Stamps	Fr
OT	77	Ory Williams	Fr
OL	78	Coen Echols	Fr
OL	79	DJ Chester	Fr
WR	80	Isaiah Stone	Fr
TE	81	Landon Craig	Fr
WR	82	Kylan Billiot	Fr
TE	85	Gabe Leonards	Jr
TE	86	Mason Taylor	Jr
WR	87	Noah Nash	Jr
TE	88	Ka'Morreun Pimpton	So
OL	89	Bo Bordelon	So

Defense

Pos.	#	Name	Class
DE	0	Paris Shand	Sr
CB	1	Ashton Stamps	So
S	2	Jardin Gilbert	Jr
S	3	Sage Ryan	Jr
DE	4	Bradyn Swinson	Sr
S	6	Jordan Allen	So
LB	7	Harold Perkins	Jr
S	8	Major Burns	Sr
S	10	Dashawn Spears	Fr
CB	11	PJ Woodland	Fr
CB	12	JK Johnson	Jr
CB	14	Zy Alexander	Sr
DE	15	Da'Shawn Womack	So
CB	17	Jyaire Brown	Jr
LB	18	Greg Penn III	Sr
DE	19	Gabriel Reliford	Fr
CB	21	Michael Turner Jr.	Fr
S	22	Joel Rogers	Fr
S	23	Kylin Jackson	Fr
CB	25	Javien Toviano	So
S	26	Quad Wilson	Sr
LB	27	Austin Ausberry	So
CB	28	Bernard Causey III	Fr
CB	29	Wallace Foster IV	Fr
LB	30	Xavier Atkins	Fr
DT	31	Jay'viar Suggs	GS
LB	33	West Weeks	Sr
GS	34	Skip Velotta	Sr
DE	35	Sai'vion Jones	Sr
CB	37	Craig Walton Jr.	Fr
S	39	Tyson Short	Fr
LB	40	Whit Weeks	So
CB	41	Justin Echols	Jr
LB	42	Davhon Keys	Fr
LB	46	Tylen Singleton	Fr
DE	48	Kolaj Cobbins	Fr
LB	50	Kenzel Kelly	GS
DE	52	Princeton Malbrue	Jr
DE	55	Jake Ibieta	Fr
DT	56	Kimo Makane'ole	Jr
DT	87	Joey August	Fr
DT	88	Jalen Thomas	Jr
DE	89	CJ Jackson	Fr
DT	90	Jacobian Guillory	Sr
DT	92	Jalen Lee	Sr
DT	93	Ahmad Breaux	Fr
DT	95	Shone Washington	So
DT	96	Dominic McKinley	Fr
DE	97	Dylan Carpenter	Fr
DT	98	De'Myrion Johnson	Fr
DT	99	Gio Paez	GS

Special teams

Pos.	#	Name	Class
K	31	Nathan Dibert	Jr
K	32	Aeron Burrell	Fr
K	34	Damian Ramos	Jr
K	36	Aidan Corbello	Fr
P	38	Peyton Todd	Jr
LS	44	Slade Roy	Sr
LS	45	Jake Davis	So
P	46	Badger Hargett	Fr
LS	49	Jonathan Ferguson	Jr
P	99	Blake Ochsendorf	GS

Head coach

- Brian Kelly

Coordinators/assistant coaches

- Frank Wilson – Associate head coach/running backs
- Blake Baker – Defensive coordinator
- Joe Sloan – Offensive coordinator/quarterbacks
- Cortez Hankton – Co-offensive coordinator/wide receivers
- Slade Nagle – Special teams coordinator/tight ends
- Brad Davis – Offensive line
- Bo Davis – Defensive line
- Kevin Peoples – Edge rushers
- Corey Raymond – Secondary
- Jake Olsen – Safeties
- Jake Flint – Director of athletic development
- Myron Tagovailoa-Amosa – Graduate assistant

Legend

- (C) Team captain
- (S) Suspended
- (I) Ineligible
- Injured
- Redshirt

Roster
Last update: September 25, 2024

== Game summaries ==
=== vs. No. 23 USC ===
No. 23 USC Trojans (0-0) vs. No. 13 LSU Tigers (0-0) – Game summary

Quarter	1	2	3	4	Total
No. 23 Trojans	0	10	3	14	27
No. 13 Tigers	0	10	7	3	20

at Allegiant Stadium • Paradise, Nevada

- Date: September 1
- Game time: 6:44 p.m.
- Game weather: Indoor
- Game attendance: 63,969
- Referee: Kevin Mar
- TV announcers (ABC): Rece Davis (play-by-play), Kirk Herbstreit (analyst), and Holly Rowe (sideline reporter)

Game information

First quarter

- No Scoring

Second quarter

- (11:01) USC - Woody Marks 2-yard rush (Mark Lantz kick) (Drive: 8 plays, 87 yards, 3:49; USC 7-0)
- (7:08) LSU - Kyren Lacy 19-yard pass from Garrett Nussmeier (Damian Ramos kick) (Drive: 9 plays, 75 yards, 3:56; Tied 7-7)
- (4:21) USC - Michael Lantz 22-yard field goal (Drive: 6 plays, 38 yards, 2:35; USC 10-7)
- (1:08) LSU - Damian Ramos 45-yard field goal (Drive: 8 plays, 47 yards, 3:13; Tied 10-10)

Third quarter

- (7:13) USC - Michael Lantz 35-yard field goal (Drive: 9 plays, 59 yards, 4:14; USC 13-10)
- (3:42) LSU - Aaron Anderson 13-yard pass from Garrett Nussmeier (Damian Ramos kick) (Drive: 7 plays, 78 yards, 3:25; LSU 17-13)

Fourth quarter

- (5:44) USC - Ja'Kobi Lane 28-yard pass from Miller Moss (Michael Lantz kick) (Drive: 3 plays, 64 yards, 1:13; USC 20-17)
- (1:47) LSU - Damian Ramos 31-yard field goal (Drive: 9 plays, 61 yards, 3:57; Tied 20-20)
- (0:08) USC - Woody Marks 13-yard rush (Michael Lantz kick) (Drive: 8 plays, 75 yards, 1:39; USC 27-20)

Statistics	USC	LSU
First downs	24	22
Total yards	421	450
Rushing yards	72	117
Passing yards	378	304
Passing: comp-att-INT	27-36-0	29-38-1
Time of possession	27:00	33:00

Team	Category	Player	Statistics
USC	Passing	Miller Moss	27/36, 378 yards, 1 TD
USC	Rushing	Woody Marks	16 carries, 68 yards, 2 TDs
USC	Receiving	Kyron Hudson	5 receptions, 68 yards
LSU	Passing	Garrett Nussmeier	29/38, 304 yards, 2 TDs
LSU	Rushing	John Emery Jr.	10 carries, 61 yards
LSU	Receiving	Kyren Lacy	7 receptions, 94 yards, 1 TD

=== vs No. 22 (FCS) Nicholls ===
No. 22 (FCS) Nicholls Colonels (0-1) vs No. 18 LSU Tigers (0-1) – Game summary

Quarter	1	2	3	4	Total
No. 22 (FCS) Colonels	7	7	7	0	21
No. 18 Tigers	9	14	21	0	44

at Tiger Stadium • Baton Rouge, Louisiana

- Date: September 7
- Game time: 6:30 p.m.
- Game weather: Sunny • Temperature: 79 °F (26 °C) • Wind: NE 7 mph
- Game attendance: 100,242
- Referee: Jeff Heaser
- TV announcers (SECN+/ESPN+): Matt Schumacker (play-by-play), Dustin Fox (analyst), and Alex Chappell (sideline reporter)

Game information

First quarter

- (11:15) LSU – 0-yard safety (LSU 2–0)
- (7:51) LSU – Trey'Dez Green 1-yard pass from Garrett Nussmeier, Damian Ramos kick (Drive: 7 plays, 27 yards, 3:13; LSU 9–0)
- (0:30) NSU – Collin Guggenheim 2-yard run, Gabe Showalter kick (Drive: 13 plays, 84 yards, 7:17; LSU 9–7)

Second quarter

- (12:17) LSU – Kyren Lacy 32-yard pass from Garrett Nussmeier, Damian Ramos kick (Drive: 8 plays, 73 yards, 3:06; LSU 16–7)
- (4:18) NSU – Lee Negrotto 18-yard pass from Quincy Brown, Gabe Showalter kick (Drive: 13 plays, 75 yards, 7:59; LSU 16–14)
- (1:53) LSU – Ju'Juan Johnson 4-yard pass from Garrett Nussmeier, Damian Ramos kick (Drive: 5 plays, 75 yards, 2:25; LSU 23–14)

Third quarter

- (13:52) NSU – Collin Guggenheim 67-yard run, Gave Showalter kick (Drive: 2 plays, 75 yards, 1:08; LSU 23–21)
- (9:03) LSU – Kyren Lacy 6-yard pass from Garrett Nussmeier, Damian Ramos kick (Drive: 11 plays, 72 yards, 4:44; LSU 30–21)
- (6:43) LSU – Kyren Lacy 7-yard pass from Garrett Nussmeier, Damian Ramos kick (Drive: 5 plays, 41 yards, 2:10; LSU 37–21)
- (1:09) LSU – Zavion Thomas 4-yard pass from Garrett Nussmeier, Damian Ramos kick (Drive: 7 plays, 45 yards, 3:56; LSU 44–21)

Fourth quarter

No scoring

Statistics	NICH	LSU
First downs	16	24
Total yards	60–295	59–382
Rushing yards	38–150	21–68
Passing yards	145	314
Passing: comp-att-INT	16–22–0	28–38–0
Time of possession	31:09	28:51

Team	Category	Player	Statistics
Nicholls	Passing	Pat McQuaide	12/16, 113 yards
Nicholls	Rushing	Collin Guggenheim	25 carries, 145 yards, 2 TD
Nicholls	Receiving	Quincy Brown	5 receptions, 48 yards
LSU	Passing	Garrett Nussmeier	27/37, 302 yards, 6 TD
LSU	Rushing	Kaleb Johnson	8 carries, 28 yards
LSU	Receiving	CJ Daniels	4 receptions, 71 yards

=== at South Carolina ===
No. 16 LSU Tigers (1-1) at South Carolina Gamecocks (2-0) – Game summary

Quarter	1	2	3	4	Total
No. 16 Tigers	0	16	6	14	36
Gamecocks	7	17	0	9	33

at Williams–Brice Stadium • Columbia, South Carolina

- Date: September 14
- Game time: 11:00 a.m.
- Game weather: Overcast, Partly cloudy, Humid
- Game attendance: 79,531
- Referee: Jason Autrey
- TV announcers (ABC): Chris Fowler (play-by-play), Kirk Herbstreit (analyst), and Holly Rowe (sideline reporter)

Game information

First quarter

- (12:14) USC – LaNorris Sellers 4-yard run (Alex Herrera kick) (Drive: 7 plays, 75 yards, 2:46; USC 7–0)

Second quarter

- (13:49) USC – Alex Herrera 28-yard field goal (Drive: 13 plays, 65 yards, 6:24; USC 10–0)
- (12:19) USC – Raheim Sanders 10-yard run (Alex Herrera kick) (Drive: 1 play, 10 yards, 0:07; USC 17–0)
- (8:08) LSU – Caden Durham 26-yard run (Damian Ramos kick) (Drive: 8 plays, 75 yards, 4:11; USC 17–7)
- (4:28) LSU – Damian Ramos 28-yard field goal (Drive: 4 plays, 7 yards, 1:32; USC 17–10)
- (4:15) USC – LaNorris Sellers 75-yard run (Alex Herrera kick) (Drive: 1 play, 75 yards, 0:13; USC 24–10)
- (1:20) LSU – Kyren Lacy 12-yard pass from Garrett Nussmeier (two-point pass conversion failed) (Drive: 6 plays, 75 yards, 2:55; USC 24–16)

Third quarter

- (6:47) LSU – Caden Durham 9-yard run (two-point pass conversion failed) (Drive: 5 plays, 45 yards, 1:38; USC 24–22)

Fourth quarter

- (14:56) LSU – Mason Taylor 2-yard pass from Garrett Nussmeier (Damian Ramos kick) (Drive: 10 plays, 80 yards, 5:03; LSU 29–24)
- (13:51) USC – Raheim Sanders 66-yard run (two-point pass conversion failed) (Drive: 3 plays, 75 yards, 1:05; USC 30–29)
- (10:34) USC – Alex Herrera 42-yard field goal (Drive: 4 plays, 0 yards, 1:23; USC 33–29)
- (1:12) LSU – Josh Williams 2-yard run (Damian Ramos kick) (Drive: 8 plays, 55 yards, 2:34; LSU 36–33)

Statistics	LSU	SCAR
First downs	26	18
Total yards	82-417	64-398
Rushing yards	132	243
Passing yards	285	155
Passing: comp-att-INT	24-40-1	11-20-1
Time of possession	32:57	27:03

Team	Category	Player	Statistics
LSU	Passing	Garrett Nussmeier	24/40, 285 yards, 2 TD, NT
LSU	Rushing	Caden Durham	11 carries, 98 yards, 2 TD
LSU	Receiving	Aaron Anderson	5 receptions, 96 yards
South Carolina	Passing	LaNorris Sellers	9/16, 113 yards, INT
South Carolina	Rushing	Raheim Sanders	19 carries, 143 yards, 2 TD
South Carolina	Receiving	Jared Brown	3 receptions, 40 yards

=== vs UCLA ===
UCLA Bruins (1-1) vs No. 16 LSU Tigers (2-1) – Game summary

Quarter	1	2	3	4	Total
Bruins	10	7	0	0	17
No. 16 Tigers	7	10	7	10	34

at Tiger Stadium • Baton Rouge, Louisiana

- Date: September 21
- Game time: 2:30 P.M.
- Game weather: Sunny • Temperature: 91 °F (33 °C) • Wind: SE at 8 miles per hour (13 km/h)
- Game attendance: 100,315
- Referee: Jerry McGinn
- TV announcers (ABC): Joe Tessitore (play-by-play), Jesse Palmer (analyst), and Katie George (sideline reporter)

Game information

First quarter

- (12:19) LSU – Zavion Thomas 5-yard pass from Garrett Nussmeier, Damian Ramos kick (Drive: 6 plays, 75 yards, 2:41; LSU 7–0)
- (8:10) UCLA – Jack Pedersen 20-yard pass from Ethan Garbers, Mateen Bhaghani kick (Drive: 8 plays, 75 yards, 4:09; Tied 7–7)
- (0:17) UCLA – Mateen Bhaghani 47-yard field goal (Drive: 7 plays, 27 yards, 3:12; UCLA 10–7)

Second quarter

- (13:57) LSU – Kyle Parker 45-yard pass from Garrett Nussmeier, Damian Ramos kick (Drive: 4 plays, 75 yards, 1:20; LSU 14–10)
- (3:45) LSU – Damian Ramos 22-yard field goal (Drive: 7 plays, 33 yards, 3:01; LSU 17–10)
- (0:02) UCLA – Logan Loya 11-yard pass from Ethan Garbers, Mateen Bhaghani kick (Drive: 11 plays, 75 yards, 3:43; Tied 17–17)

Third quarter

- (6:11) LSU – Josh Williams 2-yard run, Damian Ramos kick (Drive: 14 plays, 96 yards, 6:33; LSU 24–17)

Fourth quarter

- (11:15) LSU – Caden Durham 35-yard pass from Garrett Nussmeier, Damian Ramos kick (Drive: 11 plays, 92 yards, 5:15; LSU 31–17)
- (5:48) LSU – Damian Ramos 32-yard field goal (Drive: 8 plays, 31 yards, 3:37; LSU 34–17)

Statistics	UCLA	LSU
First downs	17	27
Total yards	58–295	72–454
Rushing yards	22–14	28–102
Passing yards	281	352
Passing: comp-att-INT	22–36–1	32–44–0
Time of possession	26:24	33:36

Team	Category	Player	Statistics
UCLA	Passing	Ethan Garbers	22/36, 281 yards, 2 TD, INT
UCLA	Rushing	Keegan Jones	3 carries, 22 yards
UCLA	Receiving	Kwazi Gilmer	2 receptions, 61 yards
LSU	Passing	Garrett Nussmeier	32/44, 352 yards, 3 TD
LSU	Rushing	Josh Williams	13 carries, 62 yards, TD
LSU	Receiving	Mason Taylor	8 receptions, 77 yards

=== vs South Alabama ===
South Alabama Jaguars (2-2) vs No. 14 LSU Tigers (3-1) – Game summary

Quarter	1	2	3	4	Total
Jaguars	0	3	7	0	10
No. 14 Tigers	21	14	0	7	42

at Tiger Stadium • Baton Rouge, Louisiana

- Date: September 28
- Game time: 6:45 p.m.
- Game weather: Sunny • Temperature: 86 °F (30 °C) • Wind: NW 5 mph
- Game attendance: 102,143
- Referee: Matt Loeffler
- TV announcers (SECN): Dave Neal (play-by-play), Aaron Murray (analyst), and Ashley ShahAhmadi (sideline reporter)

Game information

First quarter

- (14:36) LSU – Caden Durham 71-yard pass from Garrett Nussmeier, Damian Ramos kick (Drive: 1 play, 71 yards, 0:14; LSU 7–0)
- (10:47) LSU – Garrett Nussmeier 1-yard run, Damian Ramos kick (Drive: 2 plays, 87 yards, 0:54; LSU 14–0)
- (4:45) LSU – Caden Durham 8-yard run, Damian Ramos kick (Drive: 11 plays, 79 yards, 4:15; LSU 21–0)

Second quarter

- (14:15) USA – Laith Marjan 49-yard field goal (Drive: 10 plays, 44 yards, 5:30; LSU 21–3)
- (11:55) LSU – Garrett Nussmeier 5-yard run, Damian Ramos kick (Drive: 5 plays, 60 yards, 2:11; LSU 28–3)
- (4:27) LSU – Aaron Anderson 23-yard pass from Garrett Nussmeier, Damian Ramos kick (Drive: 4 plays, 69 yards, 1:37; LSU 35–3)

Third quarter

- (10:17) USA – Anthony Eager 27-yard pass from Gio Lopez, Laith Marjan kick (Drive: 9 plays, 75 yards, 4:43; LSU 35–10)

Fourth quarter

- (14:08) LSU – Josh Williams 4-yard run, Damian Ramos kick (Drive: 12 plays, 99 yards, 5:39; LSU 42–10)

Statistics	USA	LSU
First downs	16	29
Total yards	63–333	69–667
Rushing yards	33–112	27–237
Passing yards	221	430
Passing: comp-att-INT	20–30–0	29–42–2
Time of possession	31:00	29:00

Team	Category	Player	Statistics
South Alabama	Passing	Gio Lopez	16/22, 171 yards, TD
South Alabama	Rushing	Kentrel Bullock	9 carries, 56 yards
South Alabama	Receiving	Anthony Eager	4 receptions, 91 yards, TD
LSU	Passing	Garrett Nussmeier	26/39, 409 yards, 2 TD, 2 INT
LSU	Rushing	Caden Durham	7 carries, 128 yards, TD
LSU	Receiving	Kyren Lacy	5 receptions, 107 yards

=== vs No. 9 Ole Miss (Magnolia Bowl) ===
No. 9 Ole Miss Rebels (5-1) vs No. 13 LSU Tigers (4-1) – Game summary

Quarter	1	2	3	4	OT	Total
No. 9 Rebels	0	17	3	3	3	26
No. 13 Tigers	0	13	3	7	6	29

at Tiger Stadium • Baton Rouge, Louisiana

- Date: October 12
- Game time: 6:30 p.m.
- Game weather: Clear, 80 °F (27 °C)
- Game attendance: 102,212
- Referee: Ken Williamson
- TV announcers (ABC): Sean McDonough (play-by-play), Greg McElroy (analyst), and Molly McGrath (sideline reporter)

Game information

First quarter

No scoring plays

Second quarter

- (10:36) Ole Miss - Caden Davis 49 Yd Field Goal (Drive: 6 plays, 51 yards, 2:32; Ole Miss 3–0)
- (8:39) Ole Miss - Ulysses Bentley IV 50 Yd Run (Caden Davis Kick) (Drive: 4 plays, 59 yards, 1:08; Ole Miss 10–0)
- (5:33) LSU - Trey'Dez Green 12 Yd pass from Garrett Nussmeier (Damian Ramos Kick) (Drive: 6 plays, 75 yards, 3:06; Ole Miss 10–7)
- (1:42) Ole Miss - Tre Harris 15 Yd pass from Jaxson Dart (Caden Davis Kick) (Drive: 11 plays, 75 yards, 3:51; Ole Miss 17–7)
- (0:34) LSU - Damian Ramos 33 Yd Field Goal (Drive: 8 plays, 59 yards, 1:08; Ole Miss 17–10)
- (0:05) LSU - Damian Ramos 45 Yd Field Goal (Drive: 4 plays, 0 yards, 0:21; Ole Miss 17–13)

Third quarter

- (4:41) Ole Miss - Caden Davis 35 Yd Field Goal (Drive: 10 plays, 54 yards, 2:36; Ole Miss 20–13)
- (1:10) LSU - Damian Ramos 41 Yd Field Goal (Drive: 10 plays, 51 yards, 3:31; Ole Miss 20–16)

Fourth quarter

- (3:14) Ole Miss - Caden Davis 37 Yd Field Goal (Drive: 7 plays, 54 yards, 3:07; Ole Miss 23–16)
- (0:27) LSU - Aaron Anderson 23 Yd pass from Garrett Nussmeier (Damian Ramos Kick) (Drive: 13 plays, 75 yards, 2:47; Tied 23–23)

Overtime

- Ole Miss - Caden Davis 57 Yd Field Goal (Drive: 4 plays, -15 yards; Ole Miss 26–23)
- LSU - Kyren Lacy 25 Yd pass from Garrett Nussmeier (Drive: 1 play, 25 yards; LSU 29–26)

Statistics	MISS	LSU
First downs	22	22
Total yards	84–463	75–421
Rushing yards	42–179	24–84
Passing yards	284	337
Passing: comp-att-INT	24–42–1	22–51–2
Time of possession	31:50	28:10

Team	Category	Player	Statistics
Ole Miss	Passing	Jaxson Dart	24/42, 284 yards, TD, INT
Ole Miss	Rushing	Ulysses Bentley IV	11 carries, 107 yards, TD
Ole Miss	Receiving	Cayden Lee	9 receptions, 132 yards
LSU	Passing	Garrett Nussmeier	22/51, 337 yards, 3 TD, 2 INT
LSU	Rushing	Caden Durham	12 carries, 37 yards
LSU	Receiving	Kyren Lacy	5 receptions, 111 yards, TD

=== at Arkansas (rivalry) ===
No. 8 LSU Tigers (5-1) at Arkansas Razorbacks (4-2) – Game summary

Quarter	1	2	3	4	Total
No. 8 Tigers	10	6	8	10	34
Razorbacks	0	7	3	0	10

at Donald W. Reynolds Razorback Stadium • Fayetteville, Arkansas

- Date: October 19
- Game time: 6:00 p.m.
- Game attendance: 75,893
- TV announcers (ESPN): Mark Jones (play-by-play), Roddy Jones (analyst), and Quint Kessenich (sideline reporter)

Statistics	LSU	ARK
First downs	25	15
Total yards	71-384	50-277
Rushing yards	37-158	19-38
Passing yards	253	240
Passing: comp-att-INT	24-35-0	21-31-1
Time of possession	38:53	21:07

Team	Category	Player	Statistics
LSU	Passing	Garrett Nussmeier	23/34, 233 yards
LSU	Rushing	Caden Durham	21 Carries, 101 yards, 3 TD
LSU	Receiving	CJ Daniels	7 receptions, 86 yards
Arkansas	Passing	Taylen Green	21/32, 240 yards, 1 TD, 1 INT
Arkansas	Rushing	Ja'Quinden Jackson	5 carries, 26 yards
Arkansas	Receiving	Andrew Armstrong	7 receptions, 94 yards, 1 TD

=== at No. 14 Texas A&M (rivalry) ===
No. 8 LSU Tigers (6-1) at No. 14 Texas A&M Aggies (6-1) – Game summary

Quarter	1	2	3	4	Total
No. 8 Tigers	10	7	0	6	23
No. 14 Aggies	7	0	14	17	38

at Kyle Field • College Station, Texas

- Date: October 26
- Game time: 6:30 p.m.
- Game weather: Sunny, 87 °F (31 °C)
- Game attendance: 108,852
- Referee: Kyle Olson
- TV announcers (ABC): Chris Fowler (play-by-play), Kirk Herbstreit (analyst), and Holly Rowe (sideline reporter)

Game information
First quarter
- LSU – Damian Ramos 23-yard field goal, 6:15. Tigers 3–0. Drive: 11 plays, 87 yards, 5:25.
- LSU – Mason Taylor 2-yard pass from Garrett Nussmeier (Damian Ramos kick), 3:51. Tigers 10–0. Drive: 4 plays, 21 yards, 1:30.
- TAMU – Le'Veon Moss 7-yard run (Randy Bond kick), 0:07. Tigers 10–7. Drive: 9 plays, 75 yards, 3:44.

Second quarter

- LSU – Aaron Anderson 76-yard pass from Garrett Nussmeier (Damian Ramos kick), 4:55. Tigers 17–7. Drive: 3 plays, 90 yards, 0:56.

Third quarter

- TAMU – Marcel Reed 8-yard run (Randy Bond kick), 8:10. Tigers 17–14. Drive: 1 play, 8 yards, 0:07.
- TAMU – Marcel Reed 8-yard run (Randy Bond kick), 1:00. Aggies 21–17. Drive: 7 plays, 60 yards, 3:53.

Fourth quarter

- TAMU – Marcel Reed 4-yard run (Randy Bond kick), 14:07. Aggies 28–17. Drive: 5 plays, 26 yards, 1:40.
- LSU – Garrett Nussmeier 1-yard run (pass failed), 9:57. Aggies 28–23. Drive: 9 plays, 78 yards, 4:10.
- TAMU – Le'Veon Moss 3-yard run (Randy Bond kick), 8:09. Aggies 35–23. Drive: 4 plays, 75 yards, 1:48.
- TAMU – Randy Bond 26-yard field goal, 3:44. Aggies 38–23. Drive: 6 plays, 29 yards, 2:47.

Statistics	LSU	TAMU
First downs	20	17
Total yards	429	376
Rushing yards	24	242
Passing yards	405	134
Passing: comp-att-INT	25–50–3	8–20–0
Time of possession	29:27	30:33

Team	Category	Player	Statistics
LSU	Passing	Garrett Nussmeier	25/50, 405 yards, 2 TD, 3 INT
LSU	Rushing	Josh Williams	7 carries, 23 yards
LSU	Receiving	Aaron Anderson	3 receptions, 126 yards, TD
Texas A&M	Passing	Marcel Reed	2/2, 70 yards
Texas A&M	Rushing	Amari Daniels	12 carries, 91 yards
Texas A&M	Receiving	Noah Thomas	1 reception, 54 yards

=== vs No. 11 Alabama (rivalry) ===
No. 11 Alabama Crimson Tide (6-2) vs No. 15 LSU Tigers (6-2) – Game summary

Quarter	1	2	3	4	Total
No. 11 Crimson Tide	14	7	7	14	42
No. 15 Tigers	3	3	0	7	13

at Tiger Stadium • Baton Rouge, Louisiana

- Date: November 9
- Game time: 6:30 p.m.
- TV announcers (ABC): Chris Fowler (play-by-play), Kirk Herbstreit (analyst), and Holly Rowe (sideline reporter)

Statistics	ALA	LSU
First downs	23	22
Total yards	420	343
Rushing yards	311	104
Passing yards	109	239
Turnovers	0	3
Time of possession	33:55	26:05

Team	Category	Player	Statistics
Alabama	Passing	Jalen Milroe	12/18, 109 yards
Alabama	Rushing	Jalen Milroe	12 carries, 185 yards, 4 TD's
Alabama	Receiving	Jam Miller	5 receptions, 50 yards
LSU	Passing	Garrett Nussmeier	27/42, 239 yards, 1 TD, 2 INT's
LSU	Rushing	Caden Durham	8 carries, 63 yards
LSU	Receiving	Kyren Lacy	5 receptions, 79 yards, 1 TD

=== at Florida (rivalry) ===
No. 22 LSU Tigers (6-3) at Florida Gators (4-5) – Game summary

Quarter	1	2	3	4	Total
No. 22 Tigers	0	10	3	3	16
Gators	7	3	3	14	27

at Ben Hill Griffin Stadium • Gainesville, Florida

- Date: November 16
- Game time: 2:30 p.m.
- Game weather: Temperature: 76 °F (24 °C) • Wind: NE at 2 miles per hour (3.2 km/h) • Weather: Sunny
- Game attendance: 90,067
- Referee: Jeff Heaser
- TV announcers (ABC): Dave Pasch (play-by-play), Dusty Dvoracek (analyst) and Taylor McGregor (sideline)

Game information

First quarter

- Florida – Elijhah Badger 23-yard pass from DJ Lagway (Trey Smack kick), 7:12

Second quarter

- LSU – Aaron Anderson 28-yard pass from Garrett Nussmeier (Damian Ramos kick), 7:39
- Florida – Trey Smack 49-yard field goal, 3:27
- LSU – Damian Ramos 50-yard field goal, 0:10

Third quarter

- LSU – Damian Ramos 45-yard field goal, 5:54
- Florida – Trey Smack 55-yard field goal, 3:07

Fourth quarter

- Florida – Ja'Kobi Jackson 1 yard run (Trey Smack kick), 13:58
- LSU – Damian Ramos 38-yard field goal, 5:18
- Florida – Jadan Baugh 55-yard run (Trey Smack kick), 3:48

Statistics	LSU	UF
First downs	25	13
Total yards	390	339
Rushing yards	128	113
Passing yards	262	226
Turnovers	1	0
Time of possession	41:43	18:17

Team	Category	Player	Statistics
LSU	Passing	Garrett Nussmeier	27/47, 260 yards, TD
LSU	Rushing	Caden Durham	21 carries, 95 yards
LSU	Receiving	Aaron Anderson	7 receptions, 72 yards, TD
Florida	Passing	DJ Lagway	13/26, 226 yards, TD
Florida	Rushing	Jadan Baugh	6 carries, 65 yards, TD
Florida	Receiving	Elijhah Badger	6 receptions, 131 yards, TD

=== vs Vanderbilt ===
Vanderbilt Commodores (6-4) vs LSU Tigers (6-4) – Game summary

Quarter	1	2	3	4	Total
Commodores	7	0	3	7	17
Tigers	7	7	7	3	24

at Tiger Stadium • Baton Rouge, Louisiana

- Date: November 23
- Game time: 6:45 p.m.
- Game weather: Clear, 57 °F (14 °C)
- Game attendance: 102,086
- Referee: Steve Marlowe
- TV announcers (SECN): Tom Hart (play-by-play), Jordan Rodgers (analyst), and Cole Cubelic (sideline reporter)

Game information
First quarter
- VAN – Quincy Skinner Jr. 63-yard pass from Diego Pavia (Brock Taylor kick), 12:49. Commodores 7–0. Drive: 1 play, 63 yards, 0:10.
- LSU – Josh Williams 20-yard run (Damian Ramos kick), 8:17. Tied 7–7. Drive: 8 plays, 90 yards, 4:30.

Second quarter

- LSU – Josh Williams 21-yard run (Damian Ramos kick), 0:51. Tigers 14–7. Drive: 9 plays, 80 yards, 3:31.

Third quarter

- VAN – Brock Taylor 47-yard field goal, 8:26. Tigers 14–10. Drive: 12 plays, 46 yards, 6:34.
- LSU – Kyren Lacy 12-yard pass from Garrett Nussmeier (Damian Ramos kick), 3:32. Tigers 21–10. Drive: 10 plays, 77 yards, 4:46.

Fourth quarter

- LSU – Damian Ramos 28-yard field goal, 10:41. Tigers 24–10. Drive: 13 plays, 74 yards, 6:08.
- VAN – Diego Pavia 1-yard run (Brock Taylor kick), 5:47. Tigers 24–17. Drive: 10 plays, 75 yards, 4:54.

Statistics	VAN	LSU
First downs	13	27
Total yards	308	471
Rushing yards	122	139
Passing yards	186	332
Turnovers	0	0
Time of possession	25:17	34:43

Team	Category	Player	Statistics
Vanderbilt	Passing	Diego Pavia	13/24, 186 yards, TD
Vanderbilt	Rushing	Diego Pavia	6 rushes, 43 yards, TD
Vanderbilt	Receiving	Quincy Skinner Jr.	3 receptions, 72 yards, TD
LSU	Passing	Garrett Nussmeier	28/37, 332 yards, TD
LSU	Rushing	Josh Williams	14 rushes, 90 yards, 2 TD
LSU	Receiving	Kyren Lacy	6 receptions, 85 yards, TD

=== vs Oklahoma ===
Oklahoma Sooners (6–5) vs LSU Tigers (7–4) – Game summary

Quarter	1	2	3	4	Total
Sooners	7	10	0	0	17
Tigers	7	17	7	6	37

at Tiger Stadium • Baton Rouge, Louisiana

- Date: November 30
- Game time: 6:00 p.m.
- Game weather: Clear • Temperature:52
- Game attendance: 99,364
- Referee: Matt Loeffler
- TV announcers (ESPN): Tom Hart (play-by-play), Jordan Rodgers (analyst), and Cole Cubelic (sideline)

Game information

First quarter

- (7:09) LSU – Garrett Nussmeier 18 yard pass to Kyren Lacy, Damian Ramos kick (Drive: 7 plays, 53 yards, 4:06; LSU 7–0)
- (3:26) OKLA – R Mason Thomas 0 yard fumble return, Zach Schmit kick (Drive: 5 plays, 0 yards, 1:27; Tied 7–7)

Second quarter

- (8:39) LSU – Damian Ramos 34 yard field goal (Drive: 5 plays, 44 yards, 1:45; LSU 10–7)
- (7:22) OKLA – Xavier Robinson 2 yard rush, Zach Schmit kick (Drive: 3 plays, 75 yards, 1:17; OU 14–10)
- (7:08) LSU – Aaron Anderson 100 yard kickoff return, Damian Ramos kick (Drive: 3 plays, 75 yards, 1:17; LSU 17–14)
- (2:13) OKLA – Zach Schmit 44 yard field goal (Drive: 11 plays, 49 yards, 4:55; Tied 17–17)
- (0:45) LSU – Garrett Nussmeier 40 yard pass to Chris Hilton Jr., Damian Ramos kick (Drive: 6 plays, 66 yards, 1:17; LSU 24–17)

Third quarter

- (6:48) LSU – Garrett Nussmeier 45 yard pass to Chris Hilton Jr., Damian Ramos kick (Drive: 9 plays, 88 yards, 4:51; LSU 31–17)

Fourth quarter

- (14:47) LSU – Damian Ramos 22 yard field goal (Drive: 9 plays, 54 yards, 2:35; LSU 34–17)
- (3:19) LSU – Damian Ramos 32 yard field goal (Drive: 6 plays, 13 yards, 3:10; LSU 37–17)

Statistics	OU	LSU
First downs	17	18
Total yards	227	395
Rushes/yards	37/167	29/110
Passing yards	110	285
Passing: Comp–Att–Int	14–22–1	23–34
Time of possession	29:13	30:47

Team	Category	Player	Statistics
Oklahoma	Passing	Jackson Arnold	14/21, 110 yards
Oklahoma	Rushing	Jackson Arnold	17 carries, 75 yards
Oklahoma	Receiving	J.J. Hester	1 receptions, 50 yards
LSU	Passing	Garrett Nussmeier	22/31, 277 yards, 3 TD
LSU	Rushing	Caden Durham	11 carries, 80 yards
LSU	Receiving	Chris Hilton Jr.	2 receptions, 85 yards, 2 TD

=== vs Baylor (Texas Bowl) ===
2024 Texas Bowl
LSU Tigers (8–4) vs Baylor Bears (8–4) – Game summary

Quarter	1	2	3	4	Total
Baylor	0	17	7	7	31
LSU	14	20	0	10	44

at NRG Stadium • Houston, Texas

- Date: Tuesday December 31, 2024
- Game time: 2:30 PM CST
- Game weather: Indoor
- Game attendance: 59,940
- Referee: Justin Elliot
- TV announcers (ESPN): Roy Philpott (play-by-play), Sam Acho (analyst), and Taylor Davis (sideline)
- Box score

Game information

First quarter

- (8:31) LSU – Trey'Dez Green 10 yard pass from Garrett Nussmeier, Damian Ramos kick (Drive: 12 plays, 68 yards, 6:22; LSU 7–0)
- (6:40) LSU – Davhon Keys 41 yard interception return (Drive: 5 plays, 18 yards, 1:51; LSU 14–0)

Second quarter

- (14:54) BAY – Josh Cameron 21 yard pass from Sawyer Robertson, Isaiah Hankins kick (Drive: 5 plays, 50 yards, 1:22; LSU 14–7)
- (12:16) LSU – Chris Hilton Jr. 41 yard pass from Garrett Nussmeier, Damian Ramos kick (Drive: 5 plays, 81 yards, 2:30; LSU 21–7)
- (8:46) LSU – Trey'Dez Green 1 yard pass from Garrett Nussmeier, Damian Ramos kick (Drive: 6 plays, 58 yards, 1:30; LSU 28–7)
- (1:41) BAY – Dawson Pendergrass 1 yard run, Isaiah Hankins kick (Drive: 6 plays, 65 yards, 1:37; LSU 28–14)
- (1:28) LSU – Zavion Thomas 95 yard kickoff return, Damian Ramos PAT failed (Drive: 6 plays, 65 yards, 1:37; LSU 34–14)
- (0:00) BAY – Isaiah Hankins 23 yard field goal (Drive: 10 plays, 69 yards, 1:28; LSU 34–17)

Third quarter

- (6:21) BAY – Ashtyn Hawkins 4 yard pass from Sawyer Robertson, Isaiah Hankins kick (Drive: 6 plays, 63 yards, 2:34; LSU 34–24)

Fourth quarter

- (14:56) LSU – Josh Williams 4 yard run, Damian Ramos kick (Drive: 7 plays, 47 yards, 3:05; LSU 41–24)
- (9:46) LSU – Damian Ramos 43 yard field goal (Drive: 5 plays, 27 yards, 2:20; LSU 44–24)
- (6:20) BAY – Dawson Pendergrass 3 yard run, Isaiah Hankins kick (Drive: 9 plays, 75 yards, 3:26; LSU 44–31)

Statistics	BAY	LSU
First downs	31	20
Total yards	507	418
Rushing yards	62	114
Passing yards	445	304
Passing: Comp–Att–Int	30-51-1	24-34-1
Time of possession	30:22	29:38

Team	Category	Player	Statistics
Baylor	Passing	Sawyer Robertson	30/51, 445 yard, 2 TD, INT
Baylor	Rushing	Dawson Pendergrass	21 carries, 63 yards, 2 TD
Baylor	Receiving	Josh Cameron	8 receptions, 111 yards, TD
LSU	Passing	Garrett Nussmeier	24/34, 304 yards, 3 TD, INT
LSU	Rushing	Caden Durham	13 carries, 60 yards
LSU	Receiving	Chris Hilton	4 receptions, 113 yards, TD

== Rankings ==
Ranking movements Legend: ██ Increase in ranking ██ Decrease in ranking — = Not ranked RV = Received votes
	Week																
Poll	Pre	1	2	3	4	5	6	7	8	9	10	11	12	13	14	15	Final
AP	13	18	16	16	14	13	13	8	8	16	14	21	RV	RV	RV	RV	RV
Coaches	12	19	17	16	13	12	10	8	7	16	13	22	RV	RV	—	RV	RV
CFP	Not released										15	22	—	—	—	—	Not released
