= 2025 Texas Bowl =

Postseason college football bowl game

2025 Kinder's Texas Bowl
- 19th Texas Bowl
LSU Tigers	Houston Cougars
(7–5)	(9–3)
SEC	Big 12
35	38
Head coach: Frank Wilson (interim)	Head coach: Willie Fritz
	AP / Coaches / CFP; NR / 24 / 21
	1	2	3	4	Total
LSU	14	0	7	14	35
Houston	7	14	7	10	38
- Date: December 27, 2025
- Season: 2025
- Stadium: NRG Stadium
- Location: Houston, Texas
- MVP: Conner Weigman (QB, Houston)
- Favorite: Houston by 1.5
- Referee: Jason Nickleby (Big Ten)
- Attendance: 63,867

United States TV coverage
- Network: ESPN
- Announcers: Tom Hart (play-by-play), Cole Cubelic (analyst) and Ian Fitzsimmons (sideline) (ESPN)

The 2025 Texas Bowl was a college football bowl game played on December 27, 2025, at the NRG Stadium located in Houston, Texas. The 19th annual Texas Bowl game began at approximately 8:15 p.m. CST and aired on ESPN. The Texas Bowl was one of the 2025–26 bowl games concluding the 2025 FBS football season. The game was sponsored by Kinder's, a maker of barbecue sauce and other seasonings, and officially known as the Kinder's Texas Bowl.

The Houston Cougars from the Big 12 Conference defeated the LSU Tigers from the Southeastern Conference (SEC) by a 38–35 score.

== Teams ==
Consistent with conference tie-ins, the game was played between a team from the Big 12 Conference, Houston, and a team from the Southeastern Conference (SEC), LSU. Prior to the Texas Bowl, the teams had played three times, most recently in 2000, with LSU holding a 2–1 edge in the series.

=== Houston Cougars ===
Houston opened their season with four consecutive wins, then lost to Texas Tech. They won their next three games and had a 7–1 record at the end of October. The Cougars lost two of their four November games—to West Virginia and TCU—and entered the Texas Bowl with a 9–3 record.

=== LSU Tigers ===
LSU opened their season with a win over fourth-ranked Clemson and also won their next three games. However, four losses in their next five games left them with a record of 5–4 through November 8. The Tigers finished their regular season with two wins in their final three games and entered the Texas Bowl with a 7–5 record.

== Game summary ==
2025 Kinder's Texas Bowl

Quarter	1	2	3	4	Total
LSU	14	0	7	14	35
No. 21 Houston	7	14	7	10	38

at NRG Stadium • Houston, Texas

- Date: Saturday, December 27, 2025
- Game time: 8:15 p.m. CST
- Game weather: Sunny
- Game attendance: 63,867
- Referee: Jason Nickleby
- TV announcers (ESPN): Tom Hart (play-by-play), Cole Cubelic (analyst), and Ian Fitzsimmons (sideline reporter)
- Box score

Game information

First quarter
Second quarter
Third quarter
Fourth quarter

=== Statistics ===
Statistics	LSU	HOU
First downs	17	32
Plays–yards	50–344	82–437
Rushes–yards	24–77	46–201
Passing yards	267	236
Passing: comp–att–int	16–26–0	27–36–0
Time of possession	21:28	38:32

Team	Category	Player	Statistics
LSU	Passing	Michael Van Buren Jr.	16/26, 267 yards, 3 TD
LSU	Rushing	Harlem Berry	3 carries, 45 yards
LSU	Receiving	Trey'Dez Green	4 receptions, 80 yards, 2 TD
Houston	Passing	Conner Weigman	27/36, 236 yards, 4 TD
Houston	Rushing	Dean Connors	16 carries, 126 yards, TD
Houston	Receiving	Tanner Koziol	9 receptions, 76 yards, TD
