= 2024 Texas Bowl =

Postseason college football bowl game

2024 Kinder's Texas Bowl
- 18th Texas Bowl
Baylor Bears	LSU Tigers
(8–4)	(8–4)
Big 12	SEC
31	44
Head coach: Dave Aranda	Head coach: Brian Kelly
	1	2	3	4	Total
Baylor	0	17	7	7	31
LSU	14	20	0	10	44
- Date: December 31, 2024
- Season: 2024
- Stadium: NRG Stadium
- Location: Houston, Texas
- MVP: Garrett Nussmeier (QB, LSU)
- Referee: Justin Elliott (ACC)
- Attendance: 59,940

United States TV coverage
- Network: ESPN
- Announcers: Roy Philpott (play-by-play), Sam Acho (analyst), and Taylor Davis (sideline)

The 2024 Texas Bowl was a college football bowl game that was played on December 31, 2024, at NRG Stadium in Houston, Texas. The 18th annual Texas Bowl game featured Baylor from the Big 12 Conference and LSU from the Southeastern Conference (SEC). The game began at approximately 3:30 p.m. EST and aired on ESPN. The Texas Bowl was one of the 2024–25 bowl games concluding the 2024 FBS football season. The game was sponsored by sauce and seasoning company Kinder's and was officially known as the Kinder's Texas Bowl.

== Teams ==
Consistent with conference tie-ins, the game was played between Baylor from the Big 12 Conference and LSU from the Southeastern Conference (SEC). The two teams had previously met 11 times, dating back to 1907, with LSU having won eight of those prior meetings.

=== Baylor Bears ===
Baylor compiled an 8–4 record during the regular season (6–3 in Big 12 play). After starting with four losses in six games, the Bears won six of their final seven games. Baylor faced three ranked FBS opponents, losing to Utah, BYU, and Iowa State.

=== LSU Tigers ===
LSU ended the regular season with a 8–4 record (5–3 in SEC play). The Tigers were nationally ranked for most of the season, reaching as high as eighth, but dropped out of the rankings after a three-game losing streak that began on October 26. LSU faced four ranked FBS opponents, defeating Ole Miss while losing to USC, Texas A&M, and Alabama.

== Game summary ==
2024 Kinder's Texas Bowl

Quarter	1	2	3	4	Total
Baylor	0	17	7	7	31
LSU	14	20	0	10	44

at NRG Stadium • Houston, Texas

- Date: Tuesday, December 31, 2024
- Game time: 2:33 p.m. CST
- Game weather: Indoor
- Game attendance: 59,940
- Referee: Justin Elliot
- TV announcers (ESPN): Roy Philpott (play-by-play), Sam Acho (analyst), and Taylor Davis (sideline)
- Box score

Game information

First quarter

- (8:31) LSU – Trey'Dez Green 10 yard pass from Garrett Nussmeier, Damian Ramos kick (Drive: 12 plays, 68 yards, 6:22; LSU 7–0)
- (6:40) LSU – Davhon Keys 41 yard interception return (Drive: 5 plays, 18 yards, 1:51; LSU 14–0)

Second quarter

- (14:54) BAY – Josh Cameron 21 yard pass from Sawyer Robertson, Isaiah Hankins kick (Drive: 5 plays, 50 yards, 1:22; LSU 14–7)
- (12:16) LSU – Chris Hilton Jr. 41 yard pass from Garrett Nussmeier, Damian Ramos kick (Drive: 5 plays, 81 yards, 2:30; LSU 21–7)
- (8:46) LSU – Trey'Dez Green 1 yard pass from Garrett Nussmeier, Damian Ramos kick (Drive: 6 plays, 58 yards, 1:30; LSU 28–7)
- (1:41) BAY – Dawson Pendergrass 1 yard run, Isaiah Hankins kick (Drive: 6 plays, 65 yards, 1:37; LSU 28–14)
- (1:28) LSU – Zavion Thomas 95 yard kickoff return, Damian Ramos PAT failed (Drive: 6 plays, 65 yards, 1:37; LSU 34–14)
- (0:00) BAY – Isaiah Hankins 23 yard field goal (Drive: 10 plays, 69 yards, 1:28; LSU 34–17)

Third quarter

- (6:21) BAY – Ashtyn Hawkins 4 yard pass from Sawyer Robertson, Isaiah Hankins kick (Drive: 6 plays, 63 yards, 2:34; LSU 34–24)

Fourth quarter

- (14:56) LSU – Josh Williams 4 yard run, Damian Ramos kick (Drive: 7 plays, 47 yards, 3:05; LSU 41–24)
- (9:46) LSU – Damian Ramos 43 yard field goal (Drive: 5 plays, 27 yards, 2:20; LSU 44–24)
- (6:20) BAY – Dawson Pendergrass 3 yard run, Isaiah Hankins kick (Drive: 9 plays, 75 yards, 3:26; LSU 44–31)

=== Statistics ===
Statistics	BAY	LSU
First downs	31	20
Plays–yards	84–507	61–418
Rushes–yards	33–62	27–114
Passing yards	445	304
Passing: comp–att–int	30–51–1	24–34–1
Time of possession	30:22	29:38

Team	Category	Player	Statistics
Baylor	Passing	Sawyer Robertson	30/51, 445 yards, 2 TD, INT
Baylor	Rushing	Dawson Pendergrass	21 carries, 63 yards, 2 TD
Baylor	Receiving	Josh Cameron	8 receptions, 111 yards, TD
LSU	Passing	Garrett Nussmeier	24/34, 304 yards, 3 TD, INT
LSU	Rushing	Caden Durham	13 carries, 60 yards
LSU	Receiving	Chris Hilton	4 receptions, 113 yards, TD
