= Aaron Anderson (American football) =

American football player (born 2002)

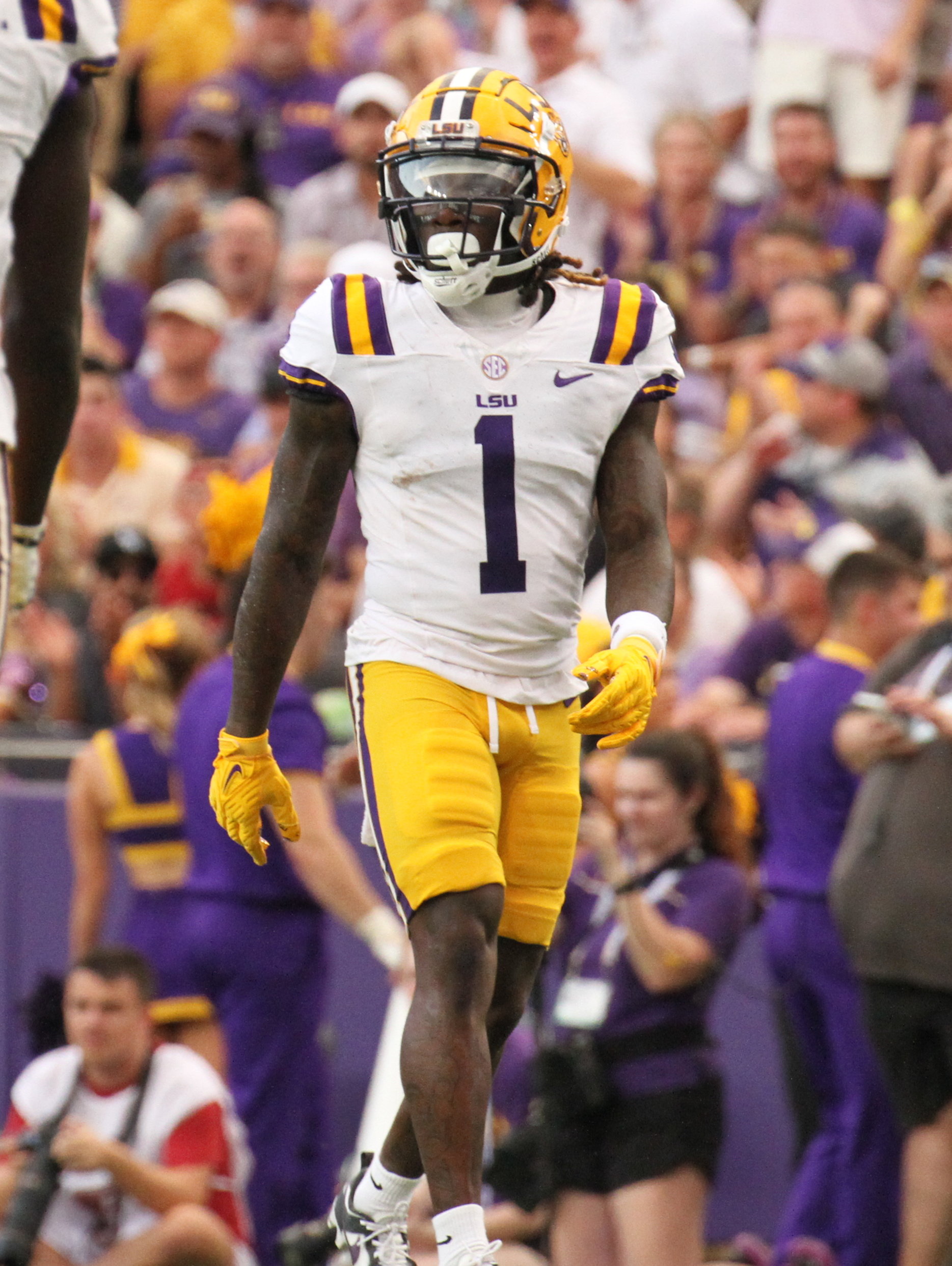
- Anderson with the LSU Tigers in 2023

Profile
- Position: Wide receiver

Personal information
- Born: December 2, 2002 (age 23); New Orleans, Louisiana, U.S.
- Listed height: 5 ft 8 in (1.73 m)
- Listed weight: 198 lb (90 kg)

Career information
- High school: Edna Karr (New Orleans)
- College: Alabama (2022); LSU (2023–2025)
- NFL draft: 2026: undrafted

Career history
- Cleveland Browns (2026)*
- * Offseason or practice squad member only
- Stats at Pro Football Reference

Aaron Anderson (born December 2, 2002) is an American professional football wide receiver. He played college football for the Alabama Crimson Tide and the LSU Tigers.

== Early life ==
Anderson attended Edna Karr High School in New Orleans, Louisiana. As a senior, Anderson recorded 74 receptions for 926 yards and 14 touchdowns. He was originally committed to Louisiana State University; however, he flipped his commitment to play college football at the University of Alabama.

== College career ==
After dealing with an injury and playing sparingly at Alabama, Anderson entered the transfer portal at the conclusion of the 2022 season.

On December 18, 2022, Anderson announced his decision to transfer to Louisiana State University, to play for the LSU Tigers. After tallying 12 receptions as a redshirt freshman, he caught his first career touchdown pass in the 2024 season opener against USC.

Season	Team	GP	Receiving			
Season	Team	GP	Rec	Yds	Avg	TD
2022	Alabama	Redshirted (redshirt)				
2023	LSU	11	12	59	4.9	0
2024	LSU	13	61	875	14.3	5
2025	LSU	9	33	398	12.1	0
Career		33	106	1,341	12.7	5

== Professional career ==
Pre-draft measurables
Height	Weight	Arm length	Hand span	Wingspan	40-yard dash	10-yard split	20-yard split	20-yard shuttle	Three-cone drill	Vertical jump	Broad jump	Bench press
5 ft 8 in (1.73 m)	191 lb (87 kg)	29 3/4 in (0.76 m)	9 1/4 in (0.23 m)	6 ft 0 3/8 in (1.84 m)	4.58 s	1.60 s	2.69 s	4.70 s	7.33 s	30.0 in (0.76 m)	9 ft 6 in (2.90 m)	15 reps
All values from NFL Combine/Pro Day

=== Cleveland Browns ===
On May 19, 2026, Anderson signed with the Cleveland Browns as an undrafted free agent. He was waived/injured by Cleveland on August 4.
