= Dean Connors =

American football player (born 2003)

No. 33 – Los Angeles Rams
- Position: Running back
- Roster status: Injured reserve

Personal information
- Born: August 29, 2003 (age 23); Bend, Oregon, U.S.
- Listed height: 5 ft 11 in (1.80 m)
- Listed weight: 206 lb (93 kg)

Career information
- High school: Murrieta Valley (Murrieta, California)
- College: Riverside (2021); Rice (2022–2024); Houston (2025)
- NFL draft: 2026: undrafted

Career history
- Los Angeles Rams (2026–present)

Career NFL statistics as of Week 3, 2026
- Return yards: 23
- Stats at Pro Football Reference

Dean Russell Connors (born August 29, 2003) is an American professional football running back for the Los Angeles Rams of the National Football League (NFL). Signed as an undrafted free agent out of the University of Houston, Connors previously played for the Rice Owls and at Riverside City College.

== Early life ==
Connors attended Paso Robles High School and Murrieta Valley High School in Murrieta, California. As a senior, Connors was named co-MVP of the Southwestern League in leading the Nighthawks to a 3-2 record during an abbreviated season due to the COVID-19 pandemic. Coming out of high school, he committed to play college football at Riverside City College.

== College career ==
=== Riverside CC ===
In his lone season at Riverside in 2021, he rushed for 516 yards on 107 carries, whereupon the conclusion of the season he entered his name into the NCAA transfer portal.

=== Rice ===
Connors transferred to play for the Rice Owls. During his first season with Rice in 2022, he ran 28 times for 128 yards and a touchdown. In Week 2 of the 2023 season, he posted 130 all-purpose yards in a double overtime win over rival Houston. Connors finished the 2023 season with 771 yards and seven touchdowns on the ground while bringing in 43 passes for 403 yards and three touchdowns. In Week 3 of the 2024 season, he recorded his team's lone touchdown in a loss to rival Houston. In the 2024 regular season finale, Connors totaled 131 yards and a touchdown in an upset win versus South Florida. He finished the 2024 season rushing for 780 yards and nine touchdowns while also hauling in 62 receptions for 498 yards and two touchdowns. After the conclusion of the 2024 season, Connors decided to enter his name into the NCAA transfer portal.

=== Houston ===
Connors transferred to play for the Houston Cougars. In Week 2 of the 2025 season, he put up 132 yards and two touchdowns in a win against rival Rice. Connors capped off his 2025 season with a dominant performance in the Texas Bowl. Connors completed the game with 126 yards on 16 carries and one rushing touchdown. Connors finished the 2025 season with a total of 1,231 all purpose yards, six rushing touchdowns and three receiving touchdowns.

== Professional career ==
Pre-draft measurables
Height	Weight	Arm length	Hand span	Wingspan	40-yard dash	10-yard split	20-yard split	20-yard shuttle	Three-cone drill	Vertical jump	Broad jump	Bench press
5 ft 11 3/8 in (1.81 m)	206 lb (93 kg)	29 5/8 in (0.75 m)	9 1/4 in (0.23 m)	5 ft 11 in (1.80 m)	4.48 s	1.57 s	2.51 s	4.29 s	6.95 s	39.5 in (1.00 m)	10 ft 2 in (3.10 m)	21 reps
All values from Pro Day

=== Los Angeles Rams ===
After going unselected in the 2026 NFL draft, on April 28, 2026 the Los Angeles Rams signed Connors as an undrafted free agent. In the Rams' 20-12 victory over the Kansas City Chiefs to open the preseason, Connors had six rushing attempts for 22 yards and caught four passes for 29 yards and two touchdowns in L.A.'s 20-12 victory. On August 30, Connors was waived by Los Angeles as a part of final roster cuts; he was re-signed to the team's practice squad the following day. On September 27, Connors was elevated to the active roster and he made his NFL debut that night, playing on special teams and returning one kickoff for 23 yards in the Rams' 30-26 loss to the Denver Broncos. On September 30, he was promoted to the active roster. Connors played in six games and recorded two tackles on special teams before suffering a broken hand in Week 8 against the Los Angeles Chargers and was placed on injured reserve.
