= Zavion Thomas =

American football player (born 2004)

No. 13 – Chicago Bears
- Positions: Wide receiver, kickoff returner
- Roster status: Active

Personal information
- Born: February 14, 2004 (age 22); Woodmere, Louisiana, U.S.
- Listed height: 5 ft 10 in (1.78 m)
- Listed weight: 190 lb (86 kg)

Career information
- High school: John Ehret (Jefferson Parish, Louisiana)
- College: Mississippi State (2022–2023); LSU (2024–2025)
- NFL draft: 2026: 3rd round, 89th overall pick

Career history
- Chicago Bears (2026–present)

Career NFL statistics as of Week 4, 2026
- Receptions: 8
- Receiving yards: 170
- Stats at Pro Football Reference

Zavion R. Thomas (born February 14, 2004) is an American professional football wide receiver and kickoff returner for the Chicago Bears of the National Football League (NFL). He played college football for the Mississippi State Bulldogs and LSU Tigers and was selected by the Bears in the third round of the 2026 NFL draft.

== Early life ==
Thomas attended John Ehret High School in Jefferson Parish, Louisiana. As a senior, he had 37 receptions for 1,025 receiving yards, 18 receiving touchdowns, 779 rushing yards, six rushing touchdowns and three punt returns for a touchdown. He committed to Mississippi State University to play college football.

== College career ==
Thomas played in 11 games as a true freshman at Mississippi State in 2022 and was named a freshman All-American as a punt returner after returning 15 punts for 202 yards and a touchdown. He entered the transfer portal after the season, but returned to Mississippi State for his sophomore year in 2023. Thomas started 8 of 11 games that season, recording 40 receptions for 503 yards and one touchdown. After the season, he entered the transfer portal again and transferred to Louisiana State University (LSU). In his first year at LSU in 2024, Thomas started 3 of 13 games and made 23 receptions for 218 yards with two touchdowns. He returned to LSU for his senior year in 2025.

=== Statistics ===
Year	Team	GP	Receiving			
Year	Team	GP	Rec	Yds	Avg	TD
2022	Mississippi State	11	2	4	2.0	0
2023	Mississippi State	11	40	503	12.6	1
2024	LSU	13	23	218	9.5	2
2025	LSU	13	41	488	11.9	4
Career		48	106	1,213	11.4	7

== Professional career ==
Pre-draft measurables
Height	Weight	Arm length	Hand span	Wingspan	40-yard dash	10-yard split	20-yard split	Vertical jump	Bench press
5 ft 10 3/8 in (1.79 m)	190 lb (86 kg)	30 1/2 in (0.77 m)	9 in (0.23 m)	6 ft 1 1/8 in (1.86 m)	4.28 s	1.52 s	2.51 s	36.0 in (0.91 m)	16 reps
All values from NFL Combine/Pro Day

Thomas was selected by the Chicago Bears in the third round, 89th overall, of the 2026 NFL draft. He signed his rookie contract on May 8.

== Personal life ==
Thomas is related to NFL Chicago Bear and Hall of Fame running back Walter Payton.
