= Chris Hilton Jr. =

American football player (born 2002)

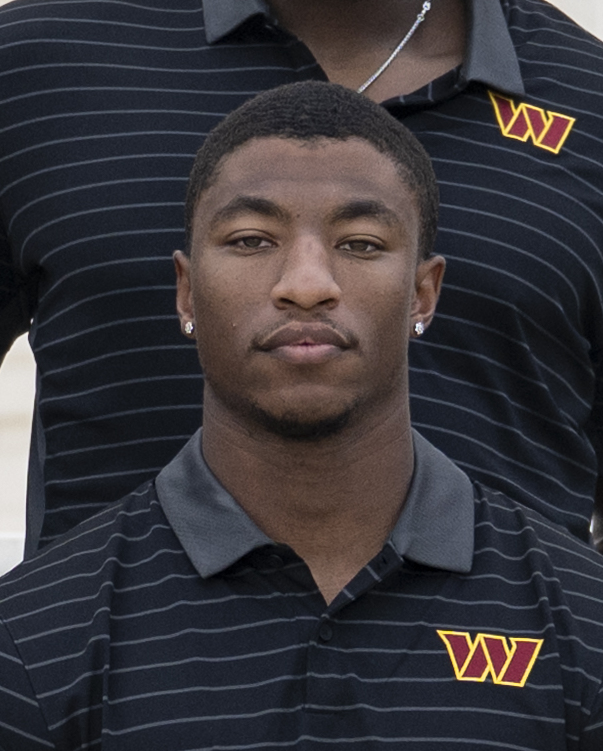
- Hilton with the Washington Commanders in 2026

Profile
- Position: Wide receiver

Personal information
- Born: October 11, 2002 (age 24); Zachary, Louisiana, U.S.
- Listed height: 6 ft 0 in (1.83 m)
- Listed weight: 188 lb (85 kg)

Career information
- High school: Zachary (Zachary, Louisiana)
- College: LSU (2021–2025)
- NFL draft: 2026: undrafted

Career history
- Washington Commanders (2026)*; Green Bay Packers (2026)*
- * Offseason or practice squad member only
- Stats at Pro Football Reference

Christopher Hilton Jr. (born October 11, 2002) is an American professional football wide receiver. Hilton played college football for the LSU Tigers and signed with the Washington Commanders as an undrafted free agent in 2026.

== Early life ==
Hilton Jr. attended Zachary High School in Zachary, Louisiana. He was rated as a four-star recruit and the 65th overall player in the class of 2021 by 247Sports, and committed to play college football for the LSU Tigers over offers from other schools such as Alabama, Georgia, and Texas A&M.

== College career ==
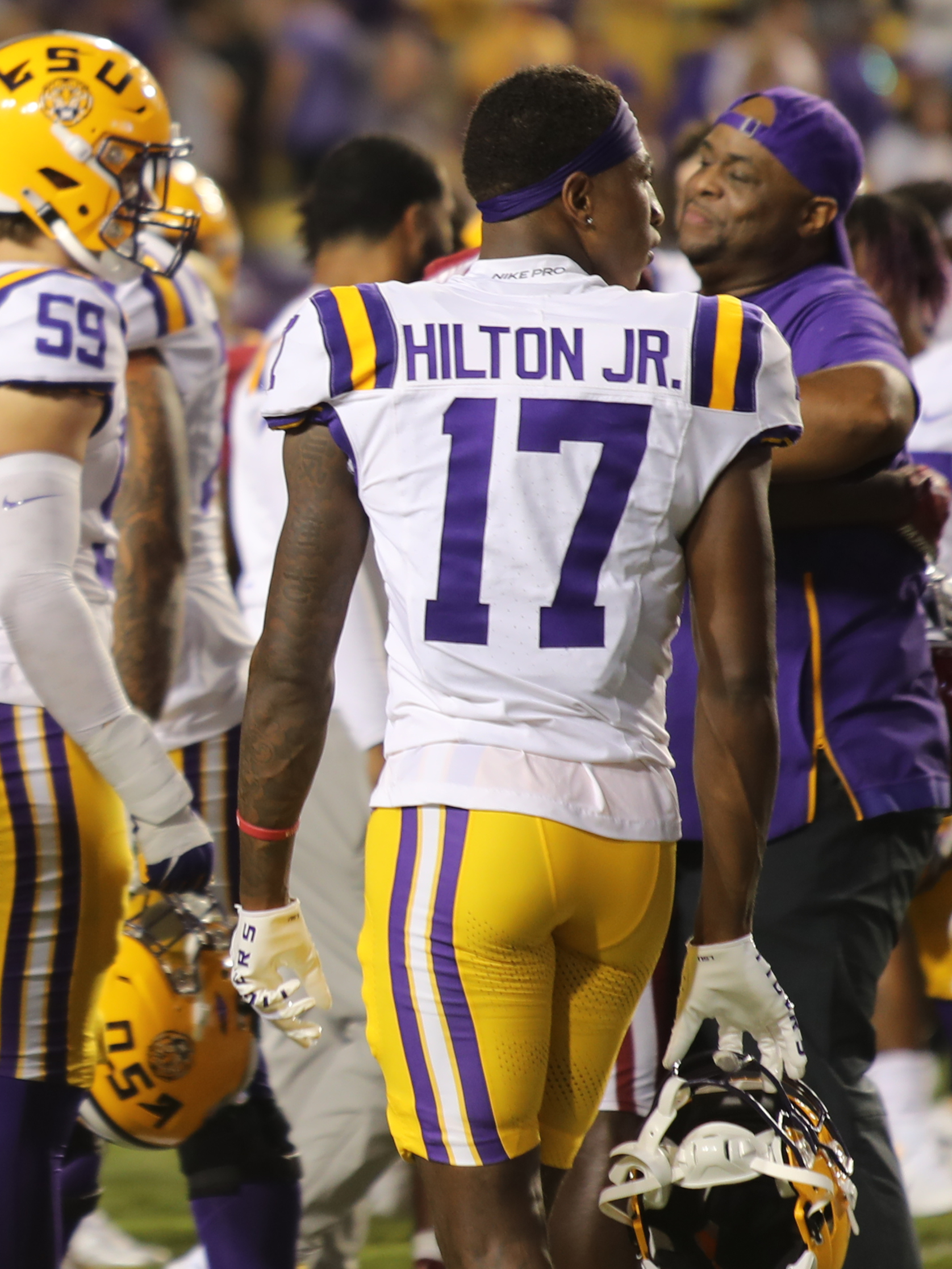
Hilton with the LSU Tigers in 2023

As a freshman in 2021, Hilton Jr. brought in two passes for 81 yards and a touchdown. During the 2022 season, he played in just four games due to injury, where he racked up seven receptions for 109 yards. In the 2024 ReliaQuest Bowl, Hilton Jr. tallied three receptions for 56 yards and a touchdown in a win over Wisconsin. He finished the 2023 season with 12 receptions for 225 yards and two touchdowns. Hilton Jr. entered the 2024 season primed to be a starter at receiver for the Tigers. In the 2024 regular season finale, he hauled in two passes for 85 yards and two touchdowns in a victory over Oklahoma. In the 2024 Texas Bowl, Hilton Jr. brought in four passes for 113 yards and a touchdown in a victory against Baylor. He finished the 2024 season with nine catches for 243 yards and three touchdowns in just six games due to injuries. In his final season at LSU in 2025, Hilton Jr. totaled ten receptions for 122 yards. He was the first player to compete at four different all-star games, participating in the Hula Bowl, American Bowl, East-West Shrine, and the Senior Bowl.

== Professional career ==
Pre-draft measurables
Height	Weight	Arm length	Hand span	Wingspan	40-yard dash	10-yard split	20-yard split	20-yard shuttle	Three-cone drill	Vertical jump	Broad jump
6 ft 0 in (1.83 m)	188 lb (85 kg)	32 in (0.81 m)	9 1/4 in (0.23 m)	6 ft 7 5/8 in (2.02 m)	4.41 s	1.57 s	2.61 s	4.35 s	7.03 s	38.5 in (0.98 m)	10 ft 2 in (3.10 m)
All values from NFL Combine/Pro Day

=== Washington Commanders ===
Hilton signed with the Washington Commanders as an undrafted free agent on May 7, 2026. He was waived by the Commanders on August 8.

=== Green Bay Packers ===
On August 9, 2026, Hilton was claimed off waivers by the Green Bay Packers. On August 30, Hilton was released by Green Bay as a part of final roster cuts; he was re-signed to the team's practice squad the next day. Hilton was released on September 15.

== Personal life ==
Hilton formerly dated professional basketball player and rapper Flau'jae Johnson.
