= Harlem Berry =

American football player (born 2007)

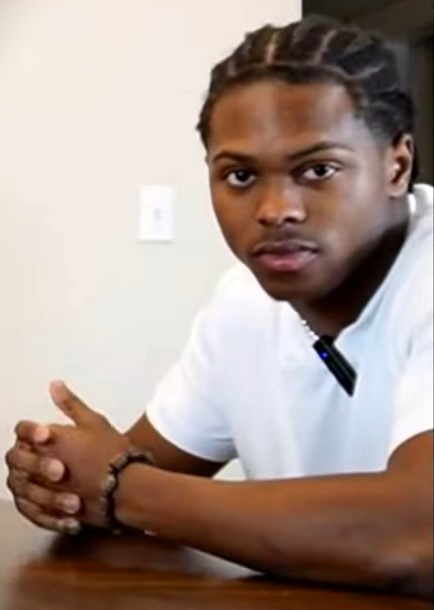
- Berry in 2025

No. 22 – LSU Tigers
- Position: Running back
- Class: Sophomore

Personal information
- Born: May 22, 2007 (age 19)
- Listed height: 5 ft 10 in (1.78 m)
- Listed weight: 187 lb (85 kg)

Career information
- High school: St. Martin's Episcopal (Metarie, Louisiana)
- College: LSU (2025–present)

Awards and highlights
- Louisiana Gatorade Player of the Year (2024)
- Stats at ESPN

Harlem Michael Berry (born May 22, 2007) is an American college football running back for the LSU Tigers.

== Early life ==
Berry attended St. Martin's Episcopal School located in Metarie, Louisiana. After signing with LSU, St. Martin's retired Berry's jersey number.

== High school career ==
During high school, Berry played both running back and free safety. Following his junior season where he ran for 2,080 yards and 37 touchdowns, he was named Allstate Sugar Bowl's Outstanding Male Amateur Athlete of the Year. On January 3, 2024, Berry committed to LSU.

Over the course of his senior season he rushed for 2,178 yards and 41 touchdowns and recorded 25 tackles, 3 forced fumbles, and blocked a field goal. Berry ran for more than 100 yards in all 12 games and averaged 12.8 yards per carry.

Over the course of his high school career, Berry was a three-time First Team All-State selection and was selected as the 2024-25 Louisiana Gatorade Football Player of the Year. He was the first running back to win the award since Leonard Fournette.

Berry concluded his prep football career with 8,571 rushing yards and 142 touchdowns.

On National Early Signing Day, Berry officially signed to play college football for the LSU Tigers.

College recruiting
Name	Hometown	School	Height	Weight	Commit date
Harlem Berry; RB	Metarie, Louisiana	St Martin's Episcopal	5 ft 10 in (1.78 m)	185 lb (84 kg)	Mar 1, 2024
Harlem Berry; RB	Recruit ratings: Rivals: 247Sports: ESPN: (87)				
