= Blake Baker =

American football player and coach (born 1982)

Current position
- Title: Defensive coordinator
- Team: LSU
- Conference: SEC

Biographical details
- Born: June 10, 1982 (age 44); Houston, Texas, U.S.

Playing career
- 2000–2004: Tulane
- Position: Linebacker

Coaching career (HC unless noted)
- 2009: Clear Springs HS (TX) (WR)
- 2010–2012: Texas (GA)
- 2013: Arkansas State (S)
- 2014: Louisiana Tech (S)
- 2015–2018: Louisiana Tech (DC/LB)
- 2019–2020: Miami (FL) (DC/ILB)
- 2021: LSU (LB)
- 2022–2023: Missouri (DC/S)
- 2024–present: LSU (DC)

Blake Winfield Baker (born June 10, 1982) is an American college football coach. He is the defensive coordinator for Louisiana State University, a position he has held since 2024. He was previously the defensive coordinator at Miami (FL), Louisiana Tech, and Missouri, as well as previously being the linebackers coach at LSU.

== Playing career 2000-2004 ==
Baker was a linebacker at Tulane from 2000 to 2004, redshirting the 2000 season. He played 42 career games, racking up 145 tackles, 14 tackles for loss, and six sacks in his college career.

== Coaching career 2009-present ==
Baker was hired as a graduate assistant at Texas in 2010, working under Longhorns defensive coordinator Manny Diaz. He was hired to be the safeties coach at Arkansas State in 2013 on Bryan Harsin's staff. After Harsin departed to accept the head coaching position at his alma mater Boise State in 2014, Baker was hired to be the Broncos director of player personnel. He spent approximately a month there before accepting an assistant coaching position at Louisiana Tech.

=== Louisiana Tech 2014 2015-2018 ===
Baker was hired to be the safeties coach at Louisiana Tech in 2014, working once again under Manny Diaz. After Diaz left to accept the defensive coordinator position at Mississippi State, Baker was promoted to defensive coordinator in 2015 and also assumed Diaz's role as the linebackers coach.

=== Miami (FL) 2019-2020 ===
Baker was named the defensive coordinator at the University of Miami by head coach Manny Diaz in January 2019. During his tenure, the Hurricanes were the 13th Best Total Defense in the country and Tied for 6th in Tackles for Loss.

=== LSU 2021 LB ===
On January 29, 2021, Baker joined LSU as linebackers coach and co-defensive coordinator. He was only at LSU for one season as he was not retained by Brian Kelly. In 2021, Baker coached Damone Clark, the nation's leading tackler and Butkus Award Finalist.

=== Missouri 2022-2023 DC/S ===
On January 20, 2022 he was announced as University of Missouri’s safeties coach. Baker had previously coached with Missouri Head Coach Eliah Drinkwitz at Arkansas State University, where Baker served as safeties coach and Drinkwitz served as Co-OC and running backs coach. After a month on the job, Steve Wilks returned to the NFL, and Baker was promoted to defensive coordinator.

=== LSU (second stint) 2024-present DC ===
On January 6, 2024, Baker was officially announced as the next defensive coordinator at LSU, where he received a $2.5 million-per-year contract that made him the highest-paid assistant coach in college football at the time.
