= Cortez Hankton =

American football player and coach (born 1981)

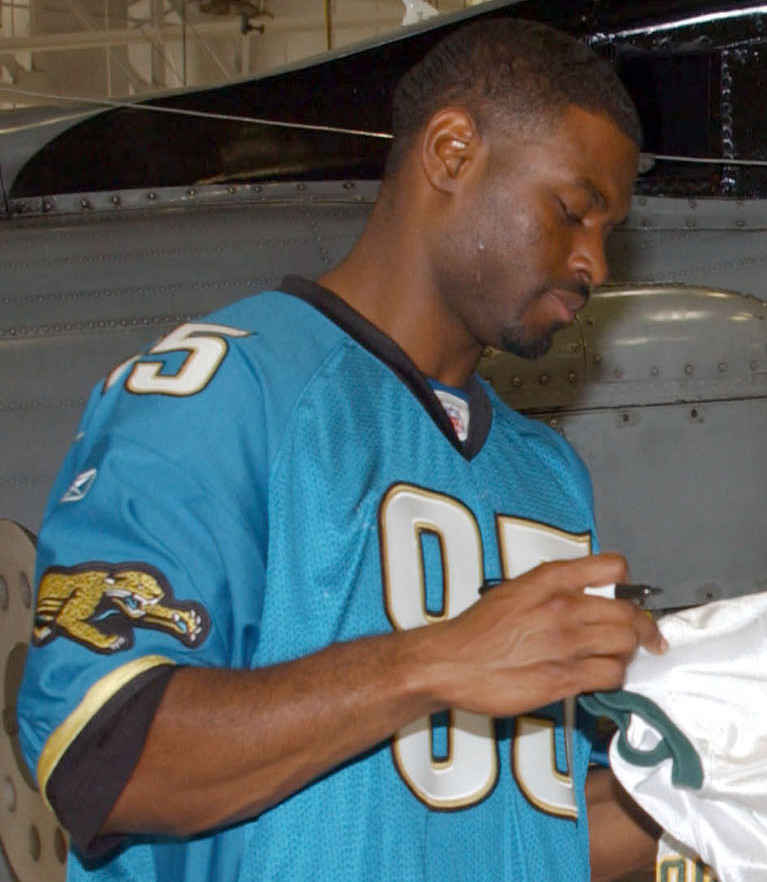
- Hankton at Naval Station Mayport with the Jacksonville Jaguars in 2005

Ohio State Buckeyes
- Title: Wide receivers coach

Personal information
- Born: January 20, 1981 (age 45); New Orleans, Louisiana, U.S.
- Listed height: 6 ft 0 in (1.83 m)
- Listed weight: 200 lb (91 kg)

Career information
- High school: St. Augustine (New Orleans)
- College: Texas Southern
- NFL draft: 2003: undrafted

Career history

Playing
- Jacksonville Jaguars (2003–2006); Minnesota Vikings (2007)*; Tampa Bay Buccaneers (2008); New York Sentinels (2009); Florida Tuskers/Virginia Destroyers (2010–2011)
- * Offseason or practice squad member only

Coaching
- Dartmouth (2012–2014) Wide receivers coach; Vanderbilt (2015–2017) Wide receivers coach; Georgia (2018) Wide receivers coach; Georgia (2019–2021) Pass game coordinator & wide receivers coach; LSU (2022–2023) Pass game coordinator & wide receivers coach; LSU (2024–2025) Co-offensive coordinator & wide receivers coach; Ohio State (2026–present) Wide receivers coach

Awards and highlights
- As player: UFL champion (2011); Third-team All-American (2002); First-team All-SWAC (2002); Second-team All-SWAC (2001); As coach: 1 National (2021)

Career NFL statistics
- Receptions: 34
- Receiving yards: 310
- Receiving touchdowns: 2
- Stats at Pro Football Reference

Cortez Hankton (born January 20, 1981) is an American college football coach and former player. He played professionally as a wide receiver in the National Football League (NFL). Hankton played collegiately for the Texas Southern Tigers. He was originally signed by the Jacksonville Jaguars as an undrafted free agent in 2003.

== Early life ==
Hankton attended St. Augustine High School in New Orleans. He lettered in football and track & field. He is a member of Kappa Alpha Psi fraternity.

== College career ==
He is Texas Southern University's record holder for career receiving yards (3,400 yds) and season receiving yards (1,270 yds). He also holds the records for most consecutive games with a receiving touchdown (10 games) and the longest play from scrimmage (99 yd receiving TD) against Texas State University. He finished his college career with 175 receptions and 30 touchdowns.

== Professional career ==
=== Jacksonville Jaguars ===
After graduating of Texas Southern in 2002, Hankton was signed as an undrafted free agent in 2003, by the Jacksonville Jaguars. He proceeded to play in all 16 games as a rookie. He would end up spending four years in Jacksonville, becoming a free agent after the 2006 season.

=== Minnesota Vikings ===
Hankton signed with the Minnesota Vikings April 16, 2007. He was waived on September 1, 2007.

=== Tampa Bay Buccaneers ===
Hankton signed a reserve/future contract with the Tampa Bay Buccaneers on January 1, 2008. He was placed on injured reserve on August 30, 2008, and spent the entire season there. He re-signed with the Buccaneers on March 5, 2009, and was released on September 5, 2009.

=== New York Sentinels ===
Hankton played in four games for the New York Sentinels of the United Football League in 2009, catching 11 passes for 144 yards.

=== Florida Tuskers/Virginia Destroyers ===
The following season he played for the Florida Tuskers under head coach Jay Gruden, and was nominated for the league's Offensive Player of the Year. He appeared in seven games, starting six, for the Tuskers in 2010, recording 23 receptions for 283 yards and two touchdowns.

The Tuskers then moved to Virginia and became the Virginia Destroyers for the 2011 season. He played in four games, all starts, for the Destroyers during the 2011 season, totaling 12 catches for 151 yards.

== Coaching career ==
Hankton was brought on to Georgia's coaching staff as pass game coordinator and wide receivers coach. Hankton was part of the Georgia staff when the Bulldogs won the National Championship that year over Alabama.
