= Dashawn Spears =

American football player (born 2006)

No. 10 – LSU Tigers
- Position: Safety
- Class: Junior

Personal information
- Born: January 3, 2006 (age 20); Utah, U.S.
- Listed height: 6 ft 3 in (1.91 m)
- Listed weight: 209 lb (95 kg)

Career information
- High school: Denham Springs (Denham Springs, Louisiana)
- College: LSU (2024–present)
- Stats at ESPN

Dashawn Spears (born Dashawn McBryde) (born January 3, 2006) is an American college football safety for the LSU Tigers.

== Early life ==
Spears was born in Utah and grew up in Denham Springs, Louisiana. He attended Denham Springs High School where he played football as a safety, initially being a member of the junior varsity team until joining the varsity team towards the end of his sophomore year. He became a starter for the varsity team as a junior in 2022. That year, he posted 10 interceptions. He was named first-team all-state in his last two years and totaled 51 tackles, nine interceptions and three defensive touchdowns as a senior in 2023. A four-star recruit, Spears was ranked the third-best player in the state and a top-100 prospect nationally in the class of 2024. He committed to play college football for the LSU Tigers.

== College career ==
As a true freshman at LSU in 2024, Spears appeared in all 13 games, three as a starter, and recorded 24 tackles. In 2025, he was named the Southeastern Conference (SEC) Defensive Player of the Week after a win over Florida, in which he recorded two interceptions. He finished the 2025 season with 29 tackles and two interceptions. After initially planning to enter the NCAA transfer portal following the 2025 season, he announced his intention to return to the Tigers in 2026.

== Personal life ==
Spears changed his last name from McBryde in 2024 to honor his stepfather.
