= Joe Sloan =

American football coach (born 1986)

Current position
- Title: Offensive coordinator
- Team: Kentucky
- Conference: SEC

Biographical details
- Born: December 6, 1986 (age 39); Chester, Virginia, U.S.
- Education: East Carolina (2008)

Playing career
- 2005–2008: East Carolina
- Position: Quarterback

Coaching career (HC unless noted)
- 2010–2011: South Florida (QC)
- 2012: South Florida (GA)
- 2013: Louisiana Tech (WR)
- 2014: Louisiana Tech (WR/RC)
- 2015–2018: Louisiana Tech (AHC/WR/RC)
- 2019: Louisiana Tech (co-OC/QB)
- 2020–2021: Louisiana Tech (OC/QB)
- 2022–2023: LSU (QB)
- 2024–2025: LSU (OC/QB)
- 2026–present: Kentucky (OC)

Joseph Whitley Sloan (born December 6, 1986) is an American football player and coach who is the offensive coordinator for the University of Kentucky. He previously served as the offensive coordinator and quarterbacks coach at LSU from 2022 to 2025.

== Early life ==
Sloan is one of three sons of William Brittle Sloan (1950-2008) and Katie Whitley Sloan. His father was an excavating contractor and real estate developer and his mother, a former elementary school teacher, taught early childhood education at John Tyler Community College. He grew up on his family's farm, Mount Blanco, one of the James River Plantations, in Enon, Virginia. He is a 2005 graduate of Thomas Dale High School where he played quarterback and his twin brother Will was a linebacker.

Football was a family tradition for the Sloan twins. Their father Bill and two uncles, Bin Sloan and Gibbons Sloan, had all played football for Thomas Dale in the 1960s. Gibbons, one of the most talented high school players in the Tri-Cities region in the early 1960s, was recruited by several colleges and ultimately accepted a football scholarship to attend NC State in 1961 where he played fullback on the Wolfpack team.

== Playing career ==
After graduating high school Sloan followed in his father's footsteps attending his dad's alma mater, East Carolina, where he majored in finance. As a freshman he earned a roster position on the East Carolina Pirates football team after walk-on tryouts and was redshirted in 2005. In 2006 he was a member of the Pirate's football team but did not experience any game day action.

In 2007 he played in all 13 games as a reserve quarterback and as the special teams unit's top holder. He played a critical role on holds in two time-expiring, game-winning field goals. He also took snaps as a quarterback during ECU's 41-6 Conference USA win over UAB at Dowdy-Ficklen Stadium, where he completed his only pass attempt for five yards to Ralph Burkey.

In 2008 he played in all 14 games as the Pirate's top holder for the second consecutive season. He successfully placed the ball for a pair of overtime game-winning field goals against UCF and Marshall, and a deciding 34-yard three-pointer at Tulsa with 1:43 to play that earned the Pirates a Conference USA title.

== Coaching career ==
Sloan got his first coaching job at South Florida where he was hired as an offensive quality control coach before becoming a graduate assistant for South Florida for one season. In 2013, Sloan was hired by Louisiana Tech to coach the team's receivers. In 2014, Sloan was promoted to also be the team's recruiting coordinator. In 2015, Louisiana Tech promoted Sloan to be their assistant head coach. In 2020, Sloan was promoted by Louisiana Tech to be the team's offensive coordinator and quarterbacks coach. After two seasons as the Bulldogs offensive coordinator, Sloan was hired by LSU to coach the team's quarterbacks. On January 23, 2024, Sloan was promoted to be LSU's offensive coordinator.

On October 27, 2025, Sloan was dismissed as LSU's offensive coordinator.

On December 4, 2025, Sloan was hired as the offensive coordinator for the Kentucky Wildcats.

== Family Life ==
Sloan is married to the former Taylor Thomas and the couple have two daughters, Whitley and Lottie.
