= PJ Woodland =

American football player (born 2005)

No. 11 – LSU Tigers
- Position: Cornerback
- Class: Junior

Personal information
- Born: September 20, 2005 (age 21)
- Listed height: 5 ft 11 in (1.80 m)
- Listed weight: 164 lb (74 kg)

Career information
- High school: Oak Grove (Hattiesburg, Mississippi)
- College: LSU (2024–present)
- Stats at ESPN

PJ Woodland (born September 20, 2005) is an American college football cornerback for the LSU Tigers.

== Early life ==
Woodland attended Oak Grove High School in Hattiesburg, Mississippi, where he played cornerback and wide receiver. As a senior, he was the Mississippi 7A Defensive Player of the Year and had over 1,300 yards receiving on offense. As a junior, he had 38 tackles and seven interceptions. Woodland committed to Louisiana State University (LSU) to play college football.

== College career ==
Woodland earned immediate playing time his freshman year at LSU in 2024. He played in all 13 games with two starts and had 20 tackles. Woodland competed to start across from Mansoor Delane his sophomore year in 2025. He won the job and started all 13 games, recording 38 tackles, two interceptions and one sack.
