= Ashton Stamps =

American football player (born 2005)

No. 1 – Arizona State Sun Devils
- Position: Cornerback
- Class: Redshirt Junior

Personal information
- Born: June 2, 2005 (age 21)
- Listed height: 6 ft 0 in (1.83 m)
- Listed weight: 190 lb (86 kg)

Career information
- High school: Archbishop Rummel (Metairie, Louisiana)
- College: LSU (2023–2025); Arizona State (2026–present)
- Stats at ESPN

Ashton Stamps (born June 2, 2005) is an American college football cornerback for the Arizona State Sun Devils. He previously played for the LSU Tigers. He parted ways with LSU midway through the 2025 season, and is expected to enter the transfer portal. Ashton started all 13 games of the 2024 season, but received limited playing time in only 3 games during the 2025 season before deciding to leave the team.

== Early life ==
Stamps attended Archbishop Rummel High School in Metairie, Louisiana. Rated as a three star-recruit, he committed to play college football for the LSU Tigers over offers from schools such as Nebraska, Missouri, Nicholls, Tulane and UTSA.

== College career ==
In week 13 of the 2023 season, Stamps made his second career start where he notched eight tackles and a pass deflections versus the Georgia State. He appeared in 11 games that season, making four starts, and notching 23 tackles with two pass deflections. Stamps entered the 2024 season as one of the Tigers starting cornerbacks. That season, he tallied 51 tackles and 14 pass deflections as a full-time starter for the Tigers.

On December 8, 2025, Stamps entered the transfer portal. He committed to Arizona State on January 6, 2026.
