= Trey'Dez Green =

American football player

No. 7 – LSU Tigers
- Position: Tight end
- Class: Junior

Personal information
- Born: February 18, 2006 (age 20); Jackson, Louisiana, U.S.
- Listed height: 6 ft 7 in (2.01 m)
- Listed weight: 242 lb (110 kg)

Career information
- High school: Zachary (Zachary, Louisiana)
- College: LSU (2024–present)

Awards and highlights
- Second-team All-SEC (2025)
- Stats at ESPN

Trey'Dez Green (born February 18, 2006) is an American college football tight end for the LSU Tigers.

== Early life ==
Green was born in Jackson, Louisiana. He attended East Feliciana High School in Jackson before transferring to Zachary High School in Zachary, Louisiana for his senior year. He played football and basketball in high school. In football, Green had 45 receptions for 864 yards with 11 touchdowns his junior year and 53 receptions for 960 yards with 12 touchdowns his senior year. He committed to play college football and college basketball at Louisiana State University (LSU).

== College career ==
As a true freshman at LSU in 2023, Green played both tight end and wide receiver. He played in all 13 games with two starts and had 13 receptions for 101 yards with four touchdowns. In basketball, he played in six games as a freshman and averaged 1.8 points and 1.7 rebounds.
