= Caden Durham =

American football player (born 2006)

No. 29 – LSU Tigers
- Position: Running back
- Class: Junior

Personal information
- Born: May 8, 2006 (age 20); Oklahoma City, Oklahoma, U.S.
- Listed height: 5 ft 9 in (1.75 m)
- Listed weight: 200 lb (91 kg)

Career information
- High school: Duncanville (Duncanville, Texas)
- College: LSU (2024–present)
- Stats at ESPN

Caden Durham (born May 8, 2006) is an American college football running back for the LSU Tigers.

== Early life and high school career ==
Durham was born in Oklahoma City, Oklahoma and moved to Duncanville, Texas following his freshman year of high school. He attended Duncanville High School where he was a standout performer in football and track. He became the lead running back for the football team in 2022 and ran for 1,960 yards and 36 touchdowns, leading Duncanville to a Class 6A state championship win. Durham was named the most valuable player of the state championship, running for over 100 yards and three touchdowns. As a senior in 2023, he ran for 2,027 yards and 35 touchdowns. A first-team MaxPreps All-American, he was the Class 6A leader in rushing touchdowns and was named the Dallas Morning News All-Area Offensive Player of the Year. Durham led Duncanville to a second consecutive state championship win, being named the offensive MVP after running for over 200 yards and three touchdowns.

In 29 total games played as a junior and senior, Durham ran for 3,987 yards and 72 touchdowns, scoring a touchdown in every one of those games. He also ran for over 100 yards in each of the final 11 playoff games in his Duncanville career, which included seven games of over 200 yards. In addition to being a top football player, Durham also excelled in track and field, winning a state championship on the 4×200 relay team as a junior and then being part of the national record-setting 4×200 relay team as a senior alongside fellow top recruit Dakorien Moore. Ranked a four-star prospect and the number eight running back nationally, he committed to play college football for the LSU Tigers.

== College career ==
In his second collegiate game, Durham ran for 98 yards and scored two touchdowns on 11 rushes against South Carolina. He was named the 247Sports True Freshman of the Week for his performance. Two weeks later, against South Alabama, he ran for 128 yards on seven carries and scored a touchdown.
