= 2024 Rutgers Scarlet Knights football team =

American college football season

2024 Rutgers Scarlet Knights football

Rate Bowl, L 41–44 vs. Kansas State
- Conference: Big Ten Conference
- Record: 7–6 (4–5 Big Ten)
- Head coach: Greg Schiano (16th season)
- Offensive coordinator: Kirk Ciarrocca (4th season)
- Offensive scheme: Spread
- Defensive coordinator: Joe Harasymiak (3rd season)
- Base defense: 4–3 or 4–2–5
- Home stadium: SHI Stadium

Uniform

2024 Big Ten Conference football standings
| | Conf. | | | Overall |
| Team | W | | L | W | | L |
|---|---|---|---|---|---|---|
| No. 3 Oregon y$^ | 9 | – | 0 | 13 | – | 1 |
| No. 10 Indiana ^ | 8 | – | 1 | 11 | – | 2 |
| No. 5 Penn State y^ | 8 | – | 1 | 13 | – | 3 |
| No. 1 Ohio State #^ | 7 | – | 2 | 14 | – | 2 |
| No. 16 Illinois | 6 | – | 3 | 10 | – | 3 |
| Iowa | 6 | – | 3 | 8 | – | 5 |
| Michigan | 5 | – | 4 | 8 | – | 5 |
| Minnesota | 5 | – | 4 | 8 | – | 5 |
| USC | 4 | – | 5 | 7 | – | 6 |
| Rutgers | 4 | – | 5 | 7 | – | 6 |
| Washington | 4 | – | 5 | 6 | – | 7 |
| Nebraska | 3 | – | 6 | 7 | – | 6 |
| UCLA | 3 | – | 6 | 5 | – | 7 |
| Wisconsin | 3 | – | 6 | 5 | – | 7 |
| Northwestern | 2 | – | 7 | 4 | – | 8 |
| Maryland | 1 | – | 8 | 4 | – | 8 |
| Michigan State† | 0 | – | 6 | 0 | – | 7 |
| Purdue | 0 | – | 9 | 1 | – | 11 |
Championship: Oregon 45, Penn State 37
# – College Football Playoff champion; ^ – College Football Playoff participant; $ – Conference champion; y – Championship game participant; † — NCAA vacated all wins for Michigan State (5–7, 3–6); Rankings from AP Poll

The 2024 Rutgers Scarlet Knights football team represented Rutgers University as a member of the Big Ten Conference during the 2024 NCAA Division I FBS football season. The Scarlet Knights were led by 16th-year head coach Greg Schiano and played their home games at SHI Stadium in Piscataway, New Jersey.

== Schedule ==
| Date | Time | Opponent | Site | TV | Result | Attendance |
|---|---|---|---|---|---|---|
| August 29 | 6:00 p.m. | Howard* | SHI Stadium; Piscataway, NJ | BTN | W 44–7 | 47,803 |
| September 7 | 12:00 p.m. | Akron* | SHI Stadium; Piscataway, NJ | BTN | W 49–17 | 41,021 |
| September 21 | 3:30 p.m. | at Virginia Tech* | Lane Stadium; Blacksburg, VA | ACCN | W 26–23 | 65,632 |
| September 27 | 8:00 p.m. | Washington | SHI Stadium; Piscataway, NJ | FOX | W 21–18 | 54,079 |
| October 5 | 4:00 p.m. | at Nebraska | Memorial Stadium; Lincoln, NE | FS1 | L 7–14 | 87,464 |
| October 12 | 12:00 p.m. | Wisconsin | SHI Stadium; Piscataway, NJ | BTN | L 7–42 | 50,111 |
| October 19 | 12:00 p.m. | UCLA^{†} | SHI Stadium; Piscataway, NJ | FS1 | L 32–35 | 53,726 |
| October 25 | 11:00 p.m. | at USC | Los Angeles Memorial Coliseum; Los Angeles, CA | FOX | L 20–42 | 63,404 |
| November 9 | 12:00 p.m. | Minnesota | SHI Stadium; Piscataway, NJ | NBC | W 26–19 | 44,120 |
| November 16 | 6:00 p.m. | at Maryland | SECU Stadium; College Park, MD | FS1 | W 31–17 | 31,433 |
| November 23 | 12:00 p.m. | No. 25 Illinois | SHI Stadium; Piscataway, NJ | Peacock | L 31–38 | 47,524 |
| November 30 | 3:30 p.m. | at Michigan State | Spartan Stadium; East Lansing, MI | FS1 | W 41–14 | 50,038 |
| December 26 | 5:30 p.m. | vs. Kansas State* | Chase Field; Phoenix, AZ (Rate Bowl) | ESPN | L 41–44 | 21,659 |
*Non-conference game; ^{†}Homecoming; Rankings from AP Poll – Released prior to game; All times are in Eastern time

== Game summaries ==
=== vs. Howard (FCS) ===
Game One – Howard Bison (FCS) (0–0) at Rutgers Scarlet Knights (0–0) – Game summary

| Quarter | 1 | 2 | 3 | 4 | Total |
|---|---|---|---|---|---|
| Bison (FCS) | 0 | 7 | 0 | 0 | 7 |
| Scarlet Knights | 7 | 10 | 14 | 13 | 44 |

at SHI Stadium, Piscataway, NJ

- Date: Thursday August 29, 2024
- Game time: 6:00 p.m.
- Game weather: 73 °F (23 °C), cloudy
- Game attendance: 47,803
- Referee: David Siegle
- TV announcers (BTN): Jason Horowitz (play-by-play), Matt Millen (analyst), and Taryn Hatcher (sideline)
- ScarletKnights.com box score

Game information

First quarter

- (8:53) RUTG – Eric Rogers 52-yard interception return (Jai Patel kick) (Rutgers 7–0)

Second quarter

- (4:51) RUTG – Dymere Miller 2-yard pass from Athan Kaliakmanis (Jai Patel kick) (Drive: 7 plays, 55 yards, 3:55; Rutgers 14–0)
- (0:40) HOW – Eden James 2-yard run (Dylan West kick) (Drive: 10 plays, 76 yards, 4:05; Rutgers 14–7)
- (0:04) RUTG – Jai Patel 36-yard field goal (Drive: 5 plays, 61 yards, 0:34; Rutgers 17–7)

Third quarter

- (8:06) RUTG – Kyle Monangai 7-yard run (Jai Patel kick) (Drive: 8 plays, 59 yards, 3:45; Rutgers 24–7)
- (2:33) RUTG – Samuel Brown V 34-yard pass from Athan Kaliakmanis (Jai Patel kick) (Drive: 10 plays, 58 yards, 4:34; Rutgers 31–7)

Fourth quarter

- (4:16) RUTG – Kenny Fletcher 3-yard pass from Athan Kaliakmanis (Jai Patel kick) (Drive: 13 plays, 87 yards, 8:16; Rutgers 38–7)
- (0:00) RUTG – Antwan Raymond 11-yard run (Drive: 2 plays, 31 yards, 0:15; Rutgers 44–7)

| Statistics | HOW | RUTG |
|---|---|---|
| First downs | 14 | 29 |
| Total yards | 60–262 | 70–476 |
| Rushing yards | 35–146 | 46–329 |
| Passing yards | 116 | 147 |
| Passing: Comp–Att–Int | 14–25–1 | 15–24–1 |
| Time of possession | 26:46 | 33:14 |

| Team | Category | Player | Statistics |
|---|---|---|---|
| Howard | Passing | Jashawn Scroggins | 14/25, 116 yards, INT |
| Howard | Rushing | Jashawn Scroggins | 12 carries, 67 yards |
| Howard | Receiving | Isiah Williams | 3 receptions, 39 yards |
| Rutgers | Passing | Athan Kaliakmanis | 15/24, 147 yards, 3 TD |
| Rutgers | Rushing | Kyle Monangai | 19 carries, 165 yards, TD |
| Rutgers | Receiving | Dymere Miller | 4 receptions, 37 yards, TD |

=== vs Akron ===
Akron Zips (0–1) vs Rutgers Scarlet Knights (1–0) – Game summary

| Quarter | 1 | 2 | 3 | 4 | Total |
|---|---|---|---|---|---|
| Zips | 0 | 3 | 7 | 7 | 17 |
| Scarlet Knights | 7 | 14 | 14 | 14 | 49 |

at SHI Stadium • Piscataway, NJ

- Date: September 7
- Game time: 12:00 p.m.
- Game weather: Cloudy • Temperature: 76 °F (24 °C) • Wind: SW 7mph
- Game attendance: 41,021
- Referee: Bryan Banks
- TV announcers (BTN): Jason Horowitz (play-by-play), Adam Breneman (analyst), and Taryn Hatcher (sideline)

Game information

First quarter

- (0:47) RU – Kyle Monangai 3-yard run, Jai Patel kick (Drive: 6 plays, 76 yards, 2:48; Rutgers 7–0)

Second quarter

- (6:06) AKR – Garrison Smith 41-yard field goal (Drive: 8 plays, 37 yards, 4:03; Rutgers 7–3)
- (1:54) RU – KJ Duff 6-yard pass from Athan Kaliakmanis, Jai Patel kick (Drive: 7 plays, 75 yards, 4:12; Rutgers 14–3)
- (0:09) RU – Kyle Monangai 1-yard run, Jai Patel kick (Drive: 9 plays, 80 yards, 1:10; Rutgers 21–3)

Third quarter

- (11:45) AKR – Adrian Norton 32-yard pass from Ben Finley, Garrison Smith kick (Drive: 8 plays, 75 yards, 3:15; Rutgers 21–10)
- (4:56) RU – Kyle Monangai 2-yard run, Jai Patel kick (Drive: 12 plays, 75 yards, 6:49; Rutgers 28–10)
- (3:14) RU – Chris Long 58-yard pass from Athan Kaliakmanis, Jai Patel kick (Drive: 2 plays, 62 yards, 0:46; Rutgers 35–10)

Fourth quarter

- (13:25) RU – Kenny Fletcher 9-yard pass from Athan Kaliakmanis, Jai Patel kick (Drive: 6 plays, 74 yards, 3:45; Rutgers 42–10)
- (11:24) RU – Antwan Raymond 1-yard run, Jai Patel kick (Drive: 2 plays, 4 yards, 0:06; Rutgers 49–10)
- (10:11) AKR – Jordon Simmons 73-yard run, Garrison Smith kick (Drive: 3 plays, 78 yards, 0:42; Rutgers 49–17)

| Statistics | AKR | RUTG |
|---|---|---|
| First downs | 15 | 26 |
| Total yards | 59–307 | 67–515 |
| Rushing yards | 25–156 | 44–285 |
| Passing yards | 151 | 230 |
| Passing: Comp–Att–Int | 17–34–1 | 14–23–1 |
| Time of possession | 27:30 | 32:30 |

| Team | Category | Player | Statistics |
|---|---|---|---|
| Akron | Passing | Ben Finley | 14/31, 138 yards, TD, INT |
| Akron | Rushing | Jordon Simmons | 9 carries, 109 yards, TD |
| Akron | Receiving | Adrian Norton | 3 receptions, 55 yards, TD |
| Rutgers | Passing | Athan Kaliakmanis | 14/23, 230 yards, 3 TD |
| Rutgers | Rushing | Kyle Monangai | 27 carries, 208 yards, 3 TD |
| Rutgers | Receiving | Chris Long | 4 receptions, 87 yards, TD |

=== at Virginia Tech ===
Rutgers Scarlet Knights (2–0) at Virginia Tech Hokies (2–1) – Game summary

| Quarter | 1 | 2 | 3 | 4 | Total |
|---|---|---|---|---|---|
| Scarlet Knights | 14 | 2 | 7 | 3 | 26 |
| Hokies | 0 | 7 | 0 | 16 | 23 |

at Lane Stadium • Blacksburg, Virginia

- Date: September 21
- Game time: 3:30 p.m.
- Game weather: Sunny • Temperature: 81 °F (27 °C) • Wind: SE at 3 miles per hour (4.8 km/h)
- Game attendance: 65,632
- Referee: Tim O'Dey
- TV announcers (ACCN): Chris Cotter (play-by-play), Mark Herzlich (analyst), and Coley Harvey (sideline)

Game information

First quarter

- (7:41) RU – Kyle Monangai 1-yard run, Jai Patel kick (Drive: 9 plays, 31 yards, 4:40; Rutgers 7–0)
- (0:58) RU – Samuel Brown V 3-yard run, Jai Patel kick (Drive: 6 plays, 61 yards, 2:52; Rutgers 14–0)

Second quarter

- (13:00) VT – Bhayshul Tuten 23-yard run, John Love kick (Drive: 8 plays, 75 yards, 2:59; Rutgers 14–7)
- (2:00) RU – Wesley Bailey 0-yard safety (Rutgers 16–7)

Third quarter

- (10:44) RU – Samuel Brown V 5-yard run, Jai Patel kick (Drive: 8 plays, 75 yards, 4:16; Rutgers 23–7)

Fourth quarter

- (14:06) VT – Bhayshul Tuten 14-yard run, Benji Gosnell pass (Drive: 2 plays, 39 yards, 0:33; Rutgers 23–15)
- (4:35) VT – Bhayshul Tuten 2-yard run, Stephen Gosnell pass (Drive: 8 plays, 80 yards, 4:16; Tied 23–23)
- (1:56) RU – Jai Patel 24-yard field goal (Drive: 5 plays, 68 yards, 2:39; Rutgers 26–23)

| Statistics | RUTG | VT |
|---|---|---|
| First downs | 25 | 14 |
| Total yards | 77–422 | 54–320 |
| Rushing yards | 52–153 | 27–183 |
| Passing yards | 269 | 137 |
| Passing: Comp–Att–Int | 16–25–0 | 13–27–1 |
| Time of possession | 39:23 | 20:37 |

| Team | Category | Player | Statistics |
|---|---|---|---|
| Rutgers | Passing | Athan Kaliakmanis | 16/25, 269 yards |
| Rutgers | Rushing | Kyle Monangai | 26 carries, 84 yards, TD |
| Rutgers | Receiving | Ian Strong | 4 receptions, 110 yards |
| Virginia Tech | Passing | Kyron Drones | 13/27, 137 yards, INT |
| Virginia Tech | Rushing | Bhayshul Tuten | 15 carries, 122 yards, 3 TD |
| Virginia Tech | Receiving | Jaylin Lane | 2 receptions, 38 yards |

=== vs Washington ===
Washington Huskies (3–1) vs Rutgers Scarlet Knights (3–0) – Game summary

| Quarter | 1 | 2 | 3 | 4 | Total |
|---|---|---|---|---|---|
| Huskies | 3 | 0 | 7 | 8 | 18 |
| Scarlet Knights | 0 | 14 | 0 | 7 | 21 |

at SHI Stadium • Piscataway, NJ

- Date: September 27
- Game time: 8:00 p.m.
- Game weather: Cloudy • Temperature: 66 °F (19 °C) • Wind: E 4 mph
- Game attendance: 54,079
- Referee: Jerry McGinn
- TV announcers (FOX): Tim Brando (play-by-play), Devin Gardner (analyst), and Josh Sims (sideline)

Game information

First quarter

- (4:10) UW – Grady Gross 22-yard field goal (Drive: 10 plays, 69 yards, 4:57; Washington 3–0)

Second quarter

- (11:26) RU – Kyle Monangai 1-yard run, Jai Patel kick (Drive: 15 plays, 75 yards, 7:44; Rutgers 7–3)
- (0:30) RU – Ian Strong 15-yard pass from Athan Kaliakmanis, Jai Patel kick (Drive: 10 plays, 81 yards, 3:56; Rutgers 14–3)

Third quarter

- (4:23) UW – Denzel Boston 51-yard pass from Will Rogers, Grady Gross kick (Drive: 6 plays, 94 yards, 3:00; Rutgers 14–10)

Fourth quarter

- (10:57) RU – Samuel Brown V 37-yard run, Jai Patel kick (Drive: 10 plays, 85 yards, 5:26; Rutgers 21–10)
- (1:40) UW – Denzel Boston 12-yard pass from Will Rogers, Keleki Latu pass (Drive: 12 plays, 76 yards, 2:56; Rutgers 21–18)

| Statistics | WASH | RUTG |
|---|---|---|
| First downs | 23 | 15 |
| Total yards | 66–521 | 57–299 |
| Rushing yards | 29–207 | 33–184 |
| Passing yards | 314 | 115 |
| Passing: Comp–Att–Int | 27–37–0 | 14–24–0 |
| Time of possession | 30:34 | 29:26 |

| Team | Category | Player | Statistics |
|---|---|---|---|
| Washington | Passing | Will Rogers | 26/36, 306 yards, 2 TD |
| Washington | Rushing | Jonah Coleman | 16 carries, 148 yards |
| Washington | Receiving | Denzel Boston | 6 receptions, 125 yards, 2 TD |
| Rutgers | Passing | Athan Kaliakmanis | 14/24, 115 yards, TD |
| Rutgers | Rushing | Kyle Monangai | 25 carries, 132 yards, TD |
| Rutgers | Receiving | Ian Strong | 5 receptions, 40 yards, TD |

=== at Nebraska ===
Rutgers Scarlet Knights (4–0) at Nebraska Cornhuskers (4–1) – Game summary

| Quarter | 1 | 2 | 3 | 4 | Total |
|---|---|---|---|---|---|
| Scarlet Knights | 0 | 0 | 0 | 7 | 7 |
| Cornhuskers | 7 | 7 | 0 | 0 | 14 |

at Memorial Stadium • Lincoln, NE

- Date: October 5
- Game time: 4:00 p.m.
- Game weather: Sunny, 97 °F (36 °C), Wind: SW @ 19 miles per hour (31 km/h)
- Game attendance: 87,464
- Referee: Larry Smith
- TV announcers (FS1): Alex Faust (play-by-play) and Robert Smith (analyst)

Game information

First Quarter

- (3:09) NEB – Dante Dowdell 1-yard run, John Hohl kick (Drive: 7 plays, 75 yards, 3:28, Nebraska 7–0)

Second Quarter

- (1:48) NEB – Janiran Bonner 11-yard run, John Hohl kick (Drive: 7 plays, 72 yards, 2:32, Nebraska 14–0)

Third Quarter

No scoring plays

Fourth Quarter

- (4:08) RUT – Ben Black 11-yard pass from Athan Kaliakmanis, Jai Patel kick (Drive: 9 plays, 50 yards, 3:40, Nebraska 14–7)

| Statistics | RUTG | NEB |
|---|---|---|
| First downs | 18 | 15 |
| Total yards | 69–264 | 70–261 |
| Rushing yards | 32–78 | 42–97 |
| Passing yards | 186 | 164 |
| Passing: Comp–Att–Int | 15–37–2 | 14–28–1 |
| Time of possession | 28:25 | 31:35 |

| Team | Category | Player | Statistics |
|---|---|---|---|
| Rutgers | Passing | Athan Kaliakmanis | 15/37, 186 yards, TD, 2 INT |
| Rutgers | Rushing | Kyle Monangai | 19 carries, 78 yards |
| Rutgers | Receiving | Ben Black | 2 receptions, 54 yards, TD |
| Nebraska | Passing | Dylan Raiola | 15/37, 186 yards, INT |
| Nebraska | Rushing | Dante Dowdell | 14 carries, 57 yards, TD |
| Nebraska | Receiving | Rahmir Johnson | 3 receptions, 40 yards |

=== vs Wisconsin ===
Wisconsin Badgers (3–2) vs Rutgers Scarlet Knights (4–1) – Game summary

| Quarter | 1 | 2 | 3 | 4 | Total |
|---|---|---|---|---|---|
| Badgers | 14 | 0 | 14 | 14 | 42 |
| Scarlet Knights | 0 | 0 | 0 | 7 | 7 |

at SHI Stadium • Piscataway, NJ

- Date: October 12
- Game time: 12:00 p.m.
- Game weather: Sunny, 74 °F (23 °C); Wind: NW 14 mph
- Game attendance: 50,111
- Referee: Mark Kluczynski
- TV announcers (BTN): Jeff Levering (play-by-play), Jake Butt (analyst), and Brooke Fletcher (sideline)

Game information

First quarter

- WIS – Will Pauling 16-yard pass from Braedyn Locke (Nathanial Vakos kick), 9:10 Wisconsin 7–0 Drive: 8 plays, 89 yards, 3:08.
- WIS – Tawee Walker 2-yard run (Nathanial Vakos kick), 1:39 Wisconsin 14–0 Drive: 7 plays, 53 yards, 3:25.

Second quarter

No scoring

Third quarter

- WIS – Darrion Dupree 2-yard run (Nathanial Vakos kick), 8:14 Wisconsin 21–0 Drive: 4 plays, 89 yards, 1:45.
- WIS – Tawee Walker 9-yard run (Nathanial Vakos kick), 4:45 Wisconsin 28–0 Drive: 6 plays, 31 yards, 3:21.

Fourth quarter

- RUT – Kyle Monangai 13-yard run (Jai Patel kick), 13:48 Wisconsin 28–7 Drive: 13 plays, 80 yards, 3:25.
- WIS – Tawee Walker 55-yard run (Nathanial Vakos kick), 11:11 Wisconsin 35–7 Drive: 4 plays, 68 yards, 2:37.
- WIS – Braedyn Locke 1-yard run (Nathanial Vakos kick), 4:47 Wisconsin 42–7 Drive: 9 plays, 80 yards, 5:25.

| Statistics | WIS | RUTG |
|---|---|---|
| First downs | 24 | 13 |
| Total yards | 549 | 271 |
| Rushing yards | 309 | 168 |
| Passing yards | 240 | 103 |
| Passing: Comp–Att–Int | 20–28–1 | 12–32–1 |
| Time of possession | 34:56 | 25:04 |

| Team | Category | Player | Statistics |
|---|---|---|---|
| Wisconsin | Passing | Braedyn Locke | 20/28, 240 yards, TD, INT |
| Wisconsin | Rushing | Tawee Walker | 24 carries, 198 yards, 3 TD |
| Wisconsin | Receiving | Will Pauling | 4 receptions, 49 yards, TD |
| Rutgers | Passing | Athan Kaliakmanis | 12/32, 103 yards, INT |
| Rutgers | Rushing | Kyle Monangai | 19 carries, 72 yards, TD |
| Rutgers | Receiving | Christian Dremel | 2 receptions, 54 yards |

=== vs UCLA ===
UCLA Bruins (1–5) vs Rutgers Scarlet Knights (4–2) – Game summary

| Quarter | 1 | 2 | 3 | 4 | Total |
|---|---|---|---|---|---|
| Bruins | 7 | 14 | 7 | 7 | 35 |
| Scarlet Knights | 7 | 3 | 9 | 13 | 32 |

at SHI Stadium • Piscataway, NJ

- Date: October 19
- Game time: 12:00 p.m.
- Game weather: Sunny
- Game attendance: 53,726
- Referee: Chris Coyte
- TV announcers (FS1): Guy Haberman (play-by-play), Yogi Roth (analyst), and Rhett Lewis (sideline)

Game information

First quarter

- UCLA – Logan Loya 5-yard pass from Ethan Garbers (Mateen Bhaghani kick), 9:03 UCLA 7-0 Drive: 11 plays, 75 yards, 5:57.
- RUT – Athan Kaliakmanis 1-yard run (Jai Patel kick), 4:43 7-7 Drive: 8 plays, 75 yards, 4:20.

Second quarter

- UCLA – Ethan Garbers 49-yard run (Mateen Bhaghani kick), 2:43 UCLA 14-7 Drive: 10 plays, 91 yards, 6:34.
- RUT – Jai Patel 49-yard field goal, 1:08 UCLA 14-10 Drive: 8 plays, 44 yards, 1:35.
- UCLA – TJ Harden 22-yard pass from Ethan Garbers (Mateen Bhaghani kick), 0:22 UCLA 21-10 Drive: 7 plays, 75 yards, 0:46.

Third quarter

- RUT – Kyle Monangai 6-yard run (Two-point run conversion failed), 12:45 UCLA 21-16 Drive: 5 plays, 75 yards, 2:15.
- RUT – Jai Patel 35-yard field goal, 5:41 UCLA 21-19 Drive: 11 plays, 41 yards, 4:52.
- UCLA – Keegan Jones 67-yard pass from Ethan Garbers (Mateen Bhaghani kick), 4:53 UCLA 28-19 Drive: 2 plays, 75 yards, 0:48.

Fourth quarter

- UCLA – Jalen Berger 9-yard pass from Ethan Garbers (Mateen Bhaghani kick), 12:13 UCLA 35-19 Drive: 10 plays, 70 yards, 5:20.
- RUT – Kyle Monangai 5-yard run (Two-point pass conversion failed), 10:35 UCLA 35-25 Drive: 6 plays, 75 yards, 1:38.
- RUT – Kyle Monangai 1-yard run (Jai Patel kick), 10:35 UCLA 35-32 Drive: 8 plays, 58 yards, 2:11.

| Statistics | UCLA | RUTG |
|---|---|---|
| First downs | 24 | 23 |
| Total yards | 478 | 422 |
| Rushing yards | 95 | 135 |
| Passing yards | 383 | 287 |
| Passing: Comp–Att–Int | 32-38-0 | 18-30-1 |
| Time of possession | 34:42 | 25:18 |

| Team | Category | Player | Statistics |
|---|---|---|---|
| UCLA | Passing | Ethan Garbers | 32/38, 383 yards, 4 TD |
| UCLA | Rushing | Ethan Garbers | 9 carries, 48 yards, 1 TD |
| UCLA | Receiving | Keegan Jones | 5 receptions, 114 yards, 1 TD |
| Rutgers | Passing | Athan Kaliakmanis | 18/30, 287 yards, INT |
| Rutgers | Rushing | Kyle Monangai | 19 carries, 106 yards, 3 TD |
| Rutgers | Receiving | KJ Duff | 3 receptions, 82 yards |

=== at USC ===
Rutgers Scarlet Knights (4–3) at USC Trojans (3–4) – Game summary

| Quarter | 1 | 2 | 3 | 4 | Total |
|---|---|---|---|---|---|
| Scarlet Knights | 3 | 9 | 8 | 0 | 20 |
| Trojans | 14 | 14 | 14 | 0 | 42 |

at Los Angeles Memorial Coliseum • Los Angeles, CA

- Date: October 25
- Game time: 11:00 p.m.
- Game weather: Clear
- Game attendance: 63,404
- Referee: Gregory Blum
- TV announcers (FOX): Jason Benetti (play-by-play), Brock Huard (analyst), and Allison Williams (sideline)

Game information

First quarter

- USC – Woody Marks 1-yard run (Michael Lantz kick), 9:58 USC 7-0 Drive: 10 plays, 77 yards, 4:56.
- RUT – Jai Patel 26-yard field goal, 4:10 USC 7-3 Drive: 12 plays, 67 yards, 5:48.
- USC – Woody Marks 1-yard run (Michael Lantz kick), 2:19 USC 14-3 Drive: 4 plays, 20 yards, 1:38.

Second quarter

- USC – Kyle Ford 11-yard pass from Miller Moss (Michael Lantz kick), 10:26 USC 21-3 Drive: 7 plays, 69 yards, 3:10.
- RUT – Antwan Raymond 3-yard run (Jai Patel PAT failed), 4:37 USC 21-9 Drive: 11 plays, 75 yards, 5:49.
- USC – Woody Marks 22-yard run (Michael Lantz kick), 1:53 USC 28-9 Drive: 6 plays, 81 yards, 2:38.
- RUT – Jai Patel 20-yard field goal, 0:00 USC 28-12 Drive: 16 plays, 73 yards, 1:53.

Third quarter

- RUT – Christian Dremel 25-yard pass from Athan Kaliakmanis (Chris Long pass to Athan Kaliakmanis for two-point conversion), 8:11 USC 28-20 Drive: 7 plays, 86 yards, 3:14.
- USC – Miller Moss 7-yard run (Michael Lantz kick), 6:32 USC 35-20 Drive: 4 plays, 75 yards, 1:39.
- USC – Makai Lemon 40-yard pass from Miller Moss (Michael Lantz kick), 0:22 USC 42-20 Drive: 3 plays, 54 yards, 1:19.

Fourth quarter

No scoring plays

| Statistics | RUTG | USC |
|---|---|---|
| First downs | 27 | 23 |
| Total yards | 434 | 443 |
| Rushing yards | 121 | 135 |
| Passing yards | 313 | 308 |
| Passing: Comp–Att–Int | 27-47-0 | 20-28-0 |
| Time of possession | 36:28 | 23:32 |

| Team | Category | Player | Statistics |
|---|---|---|---|
| Rutgers | Passing | Athan Kaliakmanis | 27/47, 313 yards, TD |
| Rutgers | Rushing | Kyle Monangai | 18 carries, 86 yards |
| Rutgers | Receiving | Dymere Miller | 11 receptions, 131 yards |
| USC | Passing | Miller Moss | 20/28, 308 yards, 2 TD |
| USC | Rushing | Woody Marks | 15 carries, 94 yards, 3 TD |
| USC | Receiving | Makai Lemon | 4 receptions, 134 yards, TD |

=== vs Minnesota ===
Minnesota Golden Gophers (6–3) vs Rutgers Scarlet Knights (4–4) – Game summary

| Quarter | 1 | 2 | 3 | 4 | Total |
|---|---|---|---|---|---|
| Golden Gophers | 9 | 0 | 7 | 3 | 19 |
| Scarlet Knights | 7 | 7 | 0 | 12 | 26 |

at SHI Stadium • Piscataway, NJ

- Date: November 9
- Game time: 12:00 p.m.
- Game weather: Sunny
- Game attendance: 44,120
- Referee: Jerry McGinn
- TV announcers (NBC): Jac Collinsworth (play-by-play), Michael Robinson (analyst), and Caroline Pineda (sideline)

Game information

First quarter

- (7:56) MINN – Darius Taylor 18-yard rush (PAT failed) (Drive: 7 plays, 65 yards, 3:03; Minnesota 6–0)
- (3:31) RUTG – Dymere Miller 1-yard pass from Athan Kaliakmanis (Jai Patel kick) (Drive: 9 plays, 75 yards, 4:25; Rutgers 7–6)
- (0:00) MINN – Dragan Kesich 51-yard field goal (Drive: 7 plays, 39 yards, 3:26; Minnesota 9–7)

Second quarter

- (9:54) RUTG – Dymere Miller 17-yard pass from Athan Kaliakmanis (Jai Patel kick) (Drive: 10 plays, 75 yards, 5:06; Rutgers 14–9)

Third quarter

- (9:01) MINN – Marcus Major 17-yard pass from Max Brosmer (Dragan Kesich kick) (Drive: 10 plays, 78 yards, 5:54; Minnesota 16–14)

Fourth quarter

- (7:41) RUTG – Ian Strong 4-yard pass from Athan Kaliakmanis (Jai Patel kick) (Drive: 2 plays, 12 yards, 0:47; Rutgers 21–16)
- (6:51) RUTG – Max Brosmer sacked by Jordan Walker for a safety (Drive: 3 plays, -13 yards, 0:46; Rutgers 23–16)
- (2:45) RUTG – Jai Patel 22-yard field goal (Drive: 6 plays, 42 yards, 1:49; Rutgers 26–16)
- (1:10) MINN – Dragan Kesich 30-yard field goal (Drive: 10 plays, 63 yards, 1:35; Rutgers 26–19)

| Statistics | MINN | RUTG |
|---|---|---|
| First downs | 18 | 19 |
| Total yards | 297 | 349 |
| Rushing yards | 35 | 109 |
| Passing yards | 262 | 240 |
| Passing: Comp–Att–Int | 27-45-0 | 17-33-1 |
| Time of possession | 28:01 | 31:59 |

| Team | Category | Player | Statistics |
|---|---|---|---|
| Minnesota | Passing | Max Brosmer | 27/45, 262 yards, TD |
| Minnesota | Rushing | Darius Taylor | 10 carries, 28 yards, TD |
| Minnesota | Receiving | Jameson Geers | 8 receptions, 73 yards |
| Rutgers | Passing | Athan Kaliakmanis | 17/33, 240 yards, 3 TD, INT |
| Rutgers | Rushing | Antwan Raymond | 22 carries, 73 yards |
| Rutgers | Receiving | Ian Strong | 4 receptions, 89 yards, TD |

=== at Maryland ===
Rutgers Scarlet Knights (5–4) at Maryland Terrapins (4–5) – Game summary

| Quarter | 1 | 2 | 3 | 4 | Total |
|---|---|---|---|---|---|
| Scarlet Knights | 0 | 14 | 7 | 10 | 31 |
| Terrapins | 3 | 7 | 7 | 0 | 17 |

at SECU Stadium • College Park, MD

- Date: November 16
- Game time: 6:00 p.m.
- Game weather: 54 °F (12 °C), cloudy
- Game attendance: 31,433
- Referee: Brian Banks
- TV announcers (FS1): Chris Myers (play-by-play) and Spencer Tillman (analyst)
- ScarletKnights.com box score

Game information

First quarter

- MD – Jack Howes 48-yard field goal, 2:06 Maryland 3-0 Drive: 13 plays, 50 yards, 6:34.

Second quarter

- RUT – Ian Strong 12-yard pass from Athan Kaliakmanis (Jai Patel kick), 8:21 Rutgers 7-3 Drive: 17 plays, 75 yards, 8:45.
- MD – Tai Felton 12-yard pass from Billy Edwards Jr. (Jack Howes kick), 4:37 Maryland 10-7 Drive: 8 plays, 75 yards, 3:44.
- RUT – Kyle Monangai 2-yard run (Jai Patel kick), 1:01 Rutgers 14-10 Drive: 9 plays, 75 yards, 3:36.

Third quarter

- MD – Roman Hemby 1-yard run (Jack Howes kick), 11:16 Maryland 17-14 Drive: 8 plays, 75 yards, 3:44.
- RUT – Kyle Monangai 6-yard run (Jai Patel kick), 5:14 Rutgers 21-17 Drive: 11 plays, 75 yards, 6:02.

Fourth quarter

- RUT – Dymere Miller 32-yard pass from Athan Kaliakmanis (Jai Patel kick), 14:55 Rutgers 28-17 Drive: 8 plays, 71 yards, 4:26.
- RUT – Jai Patel 46-yard field goal, 9:53 Rutgers 31-17 Drive: 7 plays, 44 yards, 2:30.

| Statistics | RUTG | MD |
|---|---|---|
| First downs | 24 | 26 |
| Total yards | 370 | 457 |
| Rushing yards | 132 | 122 |
| Passing yards | 238 | 335 |
| Passing: Comp–Att–Int | 20-30-0 | 32-57-0 |
| Time of possession | 32:23 | 27:37 |

| Team | Category | Player | Statistics |
|---|---|---|---|
| Rutgers | Passing | Athan Kaliakmanis | 20/30, 238 yards, 2 TD |
| Rutgers | Rushing | Kyle Monangai | 25 carries, 97 yards, 2 TD |
| Rutgers | Receiving | Dymere Miller | 8 receptions, 107 yards, TD |
| Maryland | Passing | Billy Edwards Jr. | 32/55, 335 yards, TD, INT |
| Maryland | Rushing | Roman Hemby | 16 carries, 87 yards, TD |
| Maryland | Receiving | Dylan Wade | 7 receptions, 92 yards |

=== vs No. 25 Illinois ===
No. 25 Illinois Fighting Illini (7–3) vs Rutgers Scarlet Knights (6–4) – Game summary

| Quarter | 1 | 2 | 3 | 4 | Total |
|---|---|---|---|---|---|
| No. 25 Fighting Illini | 0 | 9 | 6 | 23 | 38 |
| Scarlet Knights | 3 | 14 | 0 | 14 | 31 |

at SHI Stadium • Piscataway, NJ

- Date: November 23
- Game time: 12:00 p.m.
- Game weather: • Sunny Temperature: 49 °F (9 °C) • Wind: 17 mph
- Game attendance: 47,524
- Referee: Larry Smith
- TV announcers (Peacock): Andrew Siciliano (play-by-play), Michael Robinson (analyst), and Caroline Pineda (sideline)
- ScarletKnights.com box score

| Statistics | ILL | RUTG |
|---|---|---|
| First downs | 24 | 30 |
| Total yards | 431 | 388 |
| Rushing yards | 182 | 213 |
| Passing yards | 249 | 197 |
| Passing: comp–att–int | 12–26–0 | 19–37–0 |
| Time of possession | 25:38 | 34:18 |

| Team | Category | Player | Statistics |
|---|---|---|---|
| Illinois | Passing | Luke Altmyer | 12/26, 249 yards, 2 TD |
| Illinois | Rushing | Luke Altmyer | 11 carries, 74 yards, TD |
| Illinois | Receiving | Pat Bryant | 7 receptions, 197 yards, TD |
| Rutgers | Passing | Athan Kaliakmanis | 19/37, 175 yards, 2 TD |
| Rutgers | Rushing | Kyle Monangai | 28 carries, 122 yards |
| Rutgers | Receiving | Ian Strong | 6 receptions, 66 yards, TD |

=== at Michigan State ===
Rutgers Scarlet Knights (6–5) at Michigan State Spartans (5–6) – Game summary

| Quarter | 1 | 2 | 3 | 4 | Total |
|---|---|---|---|---|---|
| Scarlet Knights | 10 | 13 | 8 | 10 | 41 |
| Spartans | 7 | 0 | 0 | 7 | 14 |

at Spartan Stadium • East Lansing, MI

- Date: November 30
- Game time: 3:30 p.m.
- Game weather: 24 °F (−4 °C), Wind: 11 mph W, Snow
- Game attendance: 50,038
- Referee: Tim O'Dey
- TV announcers (FS1): Dan Hellie and Petros Papadakis
- ScarletKnights.com box score

Game information

First quarter

- (12:26) MSU TD: Nathan Carter 26-yard run (Jonathan Kim kick) MSU 7–0; 5 plays, 75 yards, 2:34
- (09:45) RUT TD: Kyle Monangai 7-yard run (Jai Patel kick) Tied 7–7; 5 plays, 50 yards, 2:41
- (07:29) RUT FG: Jai Patel 25-yard field goal RUT 10–7; 4 plays, -4 yards, 00:52

Second quarter

- (06:02) RUT TD: Antwan Raymond 13-yard run (Jai Patel kick) RUT 17–7; 8 plays, 94 yards, 3:59
- (01:17) RUT FG: Jai Patel 42-yard field goal RUT 20–7; 10 plays, 46 yards, 3:42
- (00:00) RUT FG: Jai Patel 30-yard field goal RUT 23–7; 9 plays, 41 yards, 00:49

Third quarter

- (07:26) RUT TD: Ian Strong 9-yard pass from Athan Kaliakmanis (two-point conversion pass KJ Duff from Athan Kaliakmanis) RUT 31–7; 14 plays, 75 yards, 7:34

Fourth quarter

- (10:55) RUT FG: Jai Patel 29-yard field goal RUT 34–7; 12 plays, 46 yards, 7:04
- (07:21) MSU TD: Jack Velling 5-yard pass from Aidan Chiles (Jonathan Kim kick) RUT 34–14; 7 plays, 75 yards, 3:34
- (01:57) RUT TD: Antwan Raymond 5-yard run (Jai Patel kick) RUT 41–14; 7 plays, 56 yards, 5:21

| Statistics | RUTG | MSU |
|---|---|---|
| First downs | 24 | 13 |
| Total yards | 365 | 253 |
| Rushing yards | 208 | 103 |
| Passing yards | 157 | 150 |
| Passing: Comp–Att–Int | 13–22–0 | 13–24–1 |
| Time of possession | 35:08 | 24:52 |

| Team | Category | Player | Statistics |
|---|---|---|---|
| Rutgers | Passing | Athan Kaliakmanis | 13/22, 157 yards, TD |
| Rutgers | Rushing | Kyle Monangai | 31 carries, 129 yards, TD |
| Rutgers | Receiving | Ian Strong | 5 receptions, 63 yards, TD |
| Michigan State | Passing | Aidan Chiles | 13/23, 150 yards, TD |
| Michigan State | Rushing | Kay'Ron Lynch-Adams | 9 carries, 69 yards |
| Michigan State | Receiving | Jack Velling | 5 receptions, 77 yards, TD |

=== vs Kansas State (Rate Bowl) ===
2024 Rate Bowl
Rutgers Scarlet Knights (7–5) vs Kansas State Wildcats (8–4) – Game summary

| Quarter | 1 | 2 | 3 | 4 | Total |
|---|---|---|---|---|---|
| Scarlet Knights | 7 | 20 | 7 | 7 | 41 |
| Wildcats | 3 | 14 | 12 | 15 | 44 |

at Chase Field • Phoenix, Arizona

- Date: Thursday, December 26, 2024
- Game time: 5:40 p.m. EST
- Game weather: Indoor
- Game attendance: 21,659
- Referee: Nate Black
- TV announcers (ESPN/ESPN Radio): Wes Durham (play-by-play), Tom Luginbill (analyst), and Dana Boyle (sideline)/Jorge Sedano (play-by-play) and Taylor McHargue (analyst)

Game information

First Quarter

- (11:21) KSU – Chris Tennant 29 yard field goal (Drive: 9 plays, 69 yards, 3:02; Kansas State 3–0)
- (4:15) RUTG – Antwan Raymond 2 yard rush, Jai Patel kick (Drive: 13 plays, 75 yards, 7:06; Rutgers 7–3)

Second Quarter

- (14:56) KSU – Avery Johnson 2 yard rush, Chris Tennant kick (Drive: 9 plays, 75 yards, 4:19; Kansas State 10–7)
- (12:55) RUTG – Jai Patel 31 yard field goal (Drive: 6 plays, 62 yards, 2:01; Tied 10–10)
- (9:31) RUTG – Ja'shon Benjamin 3 yard rush, Jai Patel kick (Drive: 4 plays, 75 yards, 1:58; Rutgers 17–10)
- (6:44) KSU – Dylan Edwards 26 yard pass from Avery Johnson, Chris Tennant kick (Drive: 6 plays, 75 yards, 2:47; Tied 17–17)
- (4:45) RUTG – Antwan Raymond 24 yard rush, Jai Patel kick (Drive: 6 plays, 75 yards, 1:59; Rutgers 24–17)
- (1:04) RUTG – Jai Patel 48 yard field goal (Drive: 7 plays, 28 yards, 1:36; Rutgers 27–17)

Third Quarter

- (8:57) RUTG – Ja'shon Benjamin 7 yard pass from Athan Kaliakmanis, Jai Patel kick (Drive: 10 plays, 64 yards, 4:22; Rutgers 34–17)
- (5:45) KSU – Dylan Edwards 65 yard rush, two-point pass conversion failed (Drive: 1 plays, 65 yards, 0:11; Rutgers 34–23)
- (3:39) KSU – Garrett Oakley 13 yard pass from Avery Johnson, two-point pass conversion failed (Drive: 4 plays, 42 yards, 1:16; Rutgers 34–29)

Fourth Quarter

- (14:02) RUTG – Antwan Raymond 1 yard rush, Jai Patel kick (Drive: 5 plays, 18 yards, 2:03; Rutgers 41–29)
- (7:03) KSU – Joe Jackson 9 yard pass from Avery Johnson, Chris Tennant kick (Drive: 14 plays, 85 yards, 6:53; Rutgers 41–36)
- (4:15) KSU – Dylan Edwards 36 yard rush, Garrett Oakley pass from Avery Johnson for two-point conversion (Drive: 3 plays, 60 yards, 1:13; Kansas State 44–41)

| Statistics | RUTG | KSU |
|---|---|---|
| First downs | 20 | 23 |
| Total yards | 401 | 542 |
| Rushing yards | 164 | 347 |
| Passing yards | 237 | 195 |
| Passing: Comp–Att–Int | 14-32-1 | 15-30-1 |
| Time of possession | 29:00 | 31:00 |

| Team | Category | Player | Statistics |
|---|---|---|---|
| Rutgers | Passing | Athan Kaliakmanis | 14/32, 237 yards, TD, INT |
| Rutgers | Rushing | Antwan Raymond | 18 carries, 113 yards, 3 TD |
| Rutgers | Receiving | Ian Strong | 5 receptions, 105 yards |
| Kansas State | Passing | Avery Johnson | 15/30, 195 yards, 3 TD, INT |
| Kansas State | Rushing | Dylan Edwards | 18 carries, 196 yards, 2 TD |
| Kansas State | Receiving | Jayce Brown | 5 receptions, 60 yards |

== Personnel ==
2024 Rutgers Scarlet Knights football team roster
Players
Coaches
Offense

| Pos. | # | Name | Class |
|---|---|---|---|
| WR | 0 | Dymere Miller | Sr |
| WR | 1 | Famah Toure | So |
| WR | 2 | Ben Black | Fr |
| WR | 3 | Chris Long | Sr |
| RB | 5 | Kyle Monangai | Sr |
| WR | 6 | Christian Dremel | Sr |
| WR | 7 | Dylan Braithwaite | So |
| WR | 8 | K. J. Duff | Fr |
| WR | 9 | Ian Strong | So |
| QB | 10 | A. J. Surace | Fr |
| TE | 11 | Logan Blake | So |
| TE | 12 | Kenny Fletcher | Jr |
| WR | 13 | Nasir Montgomery | Sr |
| TE | 14 | Matthew Ogunniyi | Fr |
| QB | 15 | Ajani Sheppard | So |
| QB | 16 | Athan Kaliakmanis | Sr |
| QB | 17 | Rocco Rainone | Fr |
| WR | 18 | Naseim Brantley | Sr |
| QB | 19 | Colin O'Sullivan | So |
| RB | 20 | Ja'Shon Benjamin | So |
| RB | 21 | Antwan Raymond | Fr |
| RB | 22 | Gabe Winowich | Fr |
| RB | 23 | Edd Guerrier | Fr |
| WR | 25 | Trent Osborn | Fr |
| RB | 27 | Samuel Brown V | Jr |
| RB | 33 | Donovan Delaney Jr. | Jr |
| RB | 41 | Jordan Kinsler | Sr |
| OL | 50 | Mozell Williams | So |
| OL | 51 | Raymond Giacobbe | Fr |
| OL | 54 | Nick Ciaffoni | Jr |
| OL | 55 | Nick Oliveira | So |
| OL | 56 | Tyler Needham | Sr |
| OL | 58 | Carter Kadow | Fr |
| OL | 59 | Gus Zilinskas | Sr |
| OL | 60 | Moses Gbagbe-Sowah | Sr |
| OL | 61 | Emir Stinette | Jr |
| OL | 62 | Cole Kozlowski | So |
| OL | 63 | Taj White | Jr |
| OL | 64 | Shedrick Rhodes Jr. | Sr |
| OL | 65 | Bryan Felter | Sr |
| OL | 69 | Kwabena Asamoah | Jr |
| OL | 70 | Reggie Sutton | Sr |
| OL | 71 | John Stone | So |
| OL | 72 | Hollin Pierce | Sr |
| OL | 73 | Terrence Salami | Sr |
| OL | 74 | Dominic Rivera | So |
| OL | 75 | Raynor Andrews | Fr |
| OL | 76 | Dantae Chin | Jr |
| OL | 77 | Kenny Jones | Fr |
| RB | 80 | Jordan Smikle | Jr |
| WR | 81 | Deondre Johnson | So |
| TE | 82 | Jackson Gister | Fr |
| WR | 83 | Dino Kaliakmanis | Sr |
| WR | 84 | Gunnison Bloodgood | Sr |
| WR | 85 | Ben Rosenblatt | So |
| TE | 86 | Liam Kilcomons | Fr |
| TE | 87 | Monte Keener | Fr |
| TE | 88 | Mike Higgins | Jr |
| TE | 89 | Victor Konopka | Sr |

Defense

| Pos. | # | Name | Class |
|---|---|---|---|
| DB | 0 | Eric Rogers | Sr |
| LB | 1 | Mohamed Toure | Sr |
| LB | 2 | Moses Walker | Jr |
| DB | 3 | Bo Mascoe | So |
| DB | 4 | Desmond Igbinosun | Sr |
| DB | 5 | Kaj Sanders | Fr |
| DB | 6 | Shaquan Loyal | Sr |
| DB | 7 | Robert Longerbeam | Sr |
| LB | 8 | Jamier Wright-Collins | Sr |
| DL | 9 | Malcolm Ray | Sr |
| DB | 10 | Flip Dixon | Sr |
| LB | 11 | Abram Wright | So |
| DB | 12 | Thomas Amankwaa | Jr |
| DB | 13 | Antonio White Jr. | Fr |
| DL | 14 | Jordan Thompson | Sr |
| DB | 15 | Zilan Williams | Jr |
| DB | 16 | Jesse Ofurie | So |
| LB | 17 | M. J. Johnson | Fr |
| DB | 18 | Fitzroy Ledgister | Jr |
| DB | 19 | Davoun Fuse | So |
| LB | 20 | Sam Robinson | Fr |
| DB | 21 | Al-Shadee Salaam | Sr |
| LB | 22 | Tyreem Powell | Sr |
| DL | 23 | Wesley Bailey | Sr |
| DB | 24 | Kevin Levy | Fr |
| DB | 25 | D. K. Gilley | Fr |
| DB | 26 | Isaiah Crumpler | Fr |
| DB | 27 | Sage Clawges | So |
| LB | 28 | Dariel Djabome | Jr |
| DB | 29 | Sebastian Jusma | Jr |
| DL | 30 | Elijah King | Fr |
| DB | 31 | Michael Robinson II | Sr |
| LB | 32 | Charlie Barth | Jr |
| LB | 33 | Lance Rice | Sr |
| DB | 34 | Noah Shaw | Fr |
| DL | 35 | David Onuoha | Jr |
| DB | 36 | Vilay Nakkoun Jr. | So |
| DB | 37 | Joe Lusardi | Sr |
| DB | 38 | Timmy Ward | Sr |
| DB | 39 | Trent Brown | So |
| DB | 40 | Zach Goodale | Sr |
| LB | 41 | Sam Gadie | Jr |
| DL | 42 | D. J. Allen | Jr |
| DB | 43 | Andrew Vargas | Jr |
| LB | 44 | Timmy Hinspeter | Jr |
| DB | 45 | Shawn Purcell | So |
| LB | 46 | Sam Pilof | Fr |
| LB | 47 | Joe Nwachukwu | Fr |
| DL | 48 | Kyonte Hamilton | Sr |
| LB | 49 | Evan Ward | Sr |
| DL | 50 | Jordany Augustin | Jr |
| DL | 51 | Troy Rainey | Sr |
| DL | 55 | Zaire Angoy | Sr |
| DL | 56 | Sean Cooper | Sr |
| LB | 59 | Liam Gilmore | Fr |
| DL | 71 | Aaron Lewis | Sr |
| DL | 80 | Aaris Bethea | Fr |
| DL | 82 | Jordan Walker | Jr |
| DL | 87 | Liam Rempel | Sr |
| DL | 90 | Farell Gnago | Fr |
| DL | 91 | Djibril Abdou Rahman | So |
| DL | 92 | Tycoolhill Luman | Fr |
| DL | 94 | JaSiré Peterson | So |
| DL | 95 | Henry Hughes Jr. | Sr |
| DL | 96 | Keshon Griffin | Sr |
| DL | 97 | Anthony Morales | Fr |
| DL | 99 | Tyclean Luman | Fr |

Special teams

| Pos. | # | Name | Class |
|---|---|---|---|
| K | 29 | Dane Pizzaro | Fr |
| K | 44 | Jai Patel | Jr |
| LS | 46 | Sammy El Hadidi | Jr |
| LS | 47 | Austin Riggs | Sr |
| K | 93 | Jack Scullion | Fr |
| P | 94 | Jakob Anderson | Fr |
| K | 97 | Riley McCann | So |
| LS | 99 | Michael O'Connor | Sr |

Head coach

- Greg Schiano

Coordinators/assistant coaches

- Kirk Ciarrocca – Offensive coordinator/quarterbacks
- Joe Harasymiak – Defensive coordinator/linebackers
- Mark Orphey – Cornerbacks
- Drew Lascari – Safeties
- Colin Ferrell – Defense linemen
- Julian Campenni – Defensive ends
- Dave Brock – Wide receivers
- Damiere Shaw – Running backs
- Pat Flaherty – Offensive linemen
- Scott Vallone – Tight ends
- Jay Butler – Director, sports performance

Legend

- (C) Team captain
- (S) Suspended
- (I) Ineligible
- Injured
- Redshirt

Roster
Last update: 09/29/24
