= John Nelson =

John Nelson may refer to:

== Arts and entertainment ==
- John L. Nelson (1916–2001), American musician, father of singer Prince
- John Nelson (conductor) (1941–2025), American conductor
- John Nelson (visual effects artist) (born 1953), American visual effects supervisor
- John Randall Nelson (born 1956), painter and sculptor based in Phoenix, Arizona
- John Allen Nelson (born 1959), American actor in film and television
- John Mark Nelson (born 1993), songwriter and producer based in Minneapolis, Minnesota
- John Arthur Nelson, director, actor, and writer

== Politics ==
- John M. Nelson (1870–1955), American political figure from Wisconsin
- John E. Nelson (Maine politician) (1874–1955), American political figure from Maine
- Jock Nelson (John Norman Nelson, 1908–1991), Australian politician
- John E. Nelson (Nebraska politician) (born 1935), American political figure in Nebraska
- John B. Nelson (born 1936), American political figure in Arizona

== Sports ==
- Candy Nelson (John W. Nelson, 1849–1910), American baseball player
- John Nelson (pitcher), American baseball player
- John Nelson (English cricketer) (1891–1917), English cricketer
- John Nelson (soccer, born 1905) (1905–1984), Scottish-born American soccer player
- Byron Nelson (John Byron Nelson, Jr., 1912–2006), American golfer
- John Nelson (footballer) (born 1934), Australian rules footballer
- John Nelson (swimmer) (born 1948), American swimmer
- Johnny Nelson (born 1967), British boxer
- John Nelson (New Zealand cricketer) (born 1975), New Zealand cricketer
- John Nelson (infielder) (born 1979), American baseball player
- John Nelson (soccer, born 1998), American soccer player

== Others ==
- John Nelson (British Army officer) (1912–1993), Commandant of the British Sector in Berlin
- John Nelson (convert), 16th-century English convert to Islam
- John Nelson (lawyer) (1791–1860), Attorney General of the United States in the 19th century
- John Nelson (martyr) (1534–1578), Catholic priest, killed for refusal to acknowledge Queen's supremacy over Church in England
- John Nelson (merchant) (1654–1734), American colonial figure in Boston
- John Nelson (physician), physician, president of the American Medical Association
- John Nelson (police officer) (1928–2003), American policeman, regarded as founder of police special forces units
- John Nelson (businessman) (born 1947), chairman of Lloyd's of London
- John Yeates Nelson (1850–1932), Australian public servant

== See also ==
- Jack Nelson (disambiguation)
- Jon Nelson (disambiguation)
- Jonathan Nelson (disambiguation)
- John Nelson House (disambiguation)
