= Jack Nelson =

Jack Nelson may refer to:

- Jack Nelson (actor) (1882–1948), American actor and film director.
- Jack Nelson (swimmer) (1931–2014), American swimmer and swimming coach.
- Jack Nelson (journalist) (1929–2009), American journalist.
- Jack Nelson (American football coach) (1927–1978), American football coach.
- Jack Nelson (offensive tackle) (born 2002), American football player
- Jack Nelson (footballer) (1906–1986), English footballer

== See also ==
- Jack Nelsen, Idaho politician
- Jack Nelson-Pallmeyer (born 1951), American academic
- John Nelson (disambiguation)
