= 2024 Wisconsin Badgers football team =

American college football season

2024 Wisconsin Badgers football
- Conference: Big Ten Conference
- Record: 5–7 (3–6 Big Ten)
- Head coach: Luke Fickell (2nd season)
- Offensive coordinator: Phil Longo (2nd season; first ten games); None (final two games)
- Offensive scheme: Air raid
- Defensive coordinator: Mike Tressel (2nd season)
- Co-defensive coordinator: Alex Grinch (1st season)
- Base defense: 4–2–5 or 3–4
- Home stadium: Camp Randall Stadium

Uniform
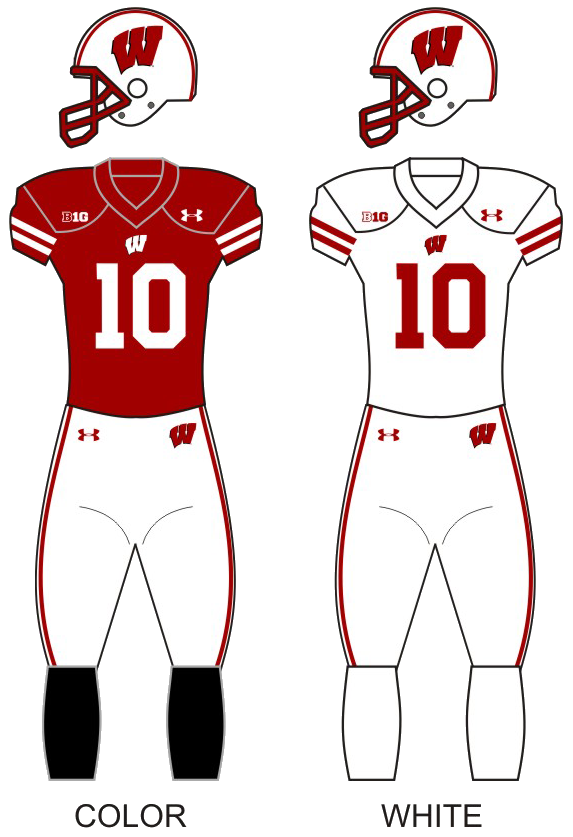

2024 Big Ten Conference football standings
| | Conf. | | | Overall |
| Team | W | | L | W | | L |
|---|---|---|---|---|---|---|
| No. 3 Oregon y$^ | 9 | – | 0 | 13 | – | 1 |
| No. 10 Indiana ^ | 8 | – | 1 | 11 | – | 2 |
| No. 5 Penn State y^ | 8 | – | 1 | 13 | – | 3 |
| No. 1 Ohio State #^ | 7 | – | 2 | 14 | – | 2 |
| No. 16 Illinois | 6 | – | 3 | 10 | – | 3 |
| Iowa | 6 | – | 3 | 8 | – | 5 |
| Michigan | 5 | – | 4 | 8 | – | 5 |
| Minnesota | 5 | – | 4 | 8 | – | 5 |
| USC | 4 | – | 5 | 7 | – | 6 |
| Rutgers | 4 | – | 5 | 7 | – | 6 |
| Washington | 4 | – | 5 | 6 | – | 7 |
| Nebraska | 3 | – | 6 | 7 | – | 6 |
| UCLA | 3 | – | 6 | 5 | – | 7 |
| Wisconsin | 3 | – | 6 | 5 | – | 7 |
| Northwestern | 2 | – | 7 | 4 | – | 8 |
| Maryland | 1 | – | 8 | 4 | – | 8 |
| Michigan State† | 0 | – | 6 | 0 | – | 7 |
| Purdue | 0 | – | 9 | 1 | – | 11 |
Championship: Oregon 45, Penn State 37
# – College Football Playoff champion; ^ – College Football Playoff participant; $ – Conference champion; y – Championship game participant; † — NCAA vacated all wins for Michigan State (5–7, 3–6); Rankings from AP Poll

The 2024 Wisconsin Badgers football team represented the University of Wisconsin–Madison as a member of the Big Ten Conference during the 2024 NCAA Division I FBS football season. The Badgers were led by second-year head coach Luke Fickell and played home games at Camp Randall Stadium located in Madison, Wisconsin.

Following a loss to rival Minnesota, Wisconsin secured their first losing season since 2001, breaking their 23-year long bowl streak.

== Offseason ==
=== 2024 NFL draft ===
| Round | Pick | Player | Position | NFL club |
|---|---|---|---|---|
| 4 | 117 | Tanor Bortolini | C | Indianapolis Colts |
| 4 | 134 | Braelon Allen | RB | New York Jets |
| Undrafted | | Travian Blaylock | S | Chicago Bears |
| Undrafted | | Tanner Mordecai | QB | San Francisco 49ers |
| Undrafted | | Peter Bowden | LS | Green Bay Packers |
| Undrafted | | Maema Njongmeta | LB | Cincinnati Bengals |
| Undrafted | | Hayden Rucci | TE | Miami Dolphins |

=== Transfers ===
Wisconsin outgoing transfers
| Name | Number | Pos. | Height | Weight | Year | Hometown | Transfer to |
|---|---|---|---|---|---|---|---|
| Keontez Lewis | #3 | WR | 6'2 | 185 | Junior | East Saint Louis, IL | Southern Illinois |
| Skyler Bell | #11 | WR | 6'1 | 185 | Sophomore (redshirt) | Bronx, NY | UConn |
| Chimere Dike | #13 | WR | 6'1 | 200 | Senior | Waukesha, WI | Florida |
| Myles Burkett | #16 | QB | 6'0 | 205 | Freshman (redshirt) | Franklin, WI | Albany |
| Darian Varner | #19 | DE | 6'3 | 275 | Junior | Norfolk, VA | Cincinnati |
| Amaun Williams | #31 | CB | 5'9 | 175 | Junior (redshirt) | Milwaukee, WI | Concordia |
| Ross Gengler | #53 | OLB | 6'3 | 220 | Junior (redshirt) | Delavan, WI | Wisconsin–La Crosse |
| Jordan Turner | #54 | ILB | 6'1 | 222 | Junior (redshirt) | Farmington, MI | Michigan State |
| Rodas Johnson | #56 | DE | 6'2 | 295 | Senior (redshirt) | Columbus, OH | Texas A&M |
| Keane Bessert | #60 | LS | 6'2 | 230 | Freshman | Fruita, CO | Kansas State |
| Dylan Barrett | #61 | OL | 6'5 | 305 | Junior (redshirt) | St. Charles, IL | Iowa State |
| Trey Wedig | #78 | OL | 6'7 | 300 | Junior (redshirt) | Oconomowoc, WI | Indiana |
| Jordan Mayer | #95 | OLB | 6'4 | 235 | Freshman | Jefferson Hills, PA | Penn State |
| Nolan Rucci | #66 | OL | 6'8 | 300 | Sophomore (redshirt) | Lititz, PA | Penn State |
| Kaden Johnson | #52 | OLB | 6'2 | 248 | Junior (redshirt) | Minneapolis, MN | Nevada |
| Aidan Vaughan | #50 | ILB | 6'2 | 224 | Freshman (redshirt) | Wixom, MI | Liberty |
| Gio Paez | #94 | DE | 6'3 | 310 | Senior (redshirt) | Los Angeles, CA | LSU |
| Nick Evers | #7 | QB | 6'3 | 186 | Sophomore (redshirt) | Flower Mound, TX | UConn |
| T.J. Bollers | #3 | OLB | 6'2 | 270 | Junior (redshirt) | Tiffin, IA | California |
| Gabe Kirschke | #58 | DL | 6'5 | 250 | Sophomore (redshirt) | Lone Tree, CO | Colorado State |
| Tommy McIntosh | #15 | WR | 6'5 | 205 | Sophomore (redshirt) | DeWitt, MI | Central Michigan |
| Mike Jarvis | #97 | DL | 6'4 | 288 | Junior (redshirt) | Medford, NJ | Liberty |
| AJ Tisdell | #29 | CB | 5'11 | 189 | Freshman (redshirt) | College Station, TX | Incarnate Word |
| Michael Mack | #7 | CB | 6'1 | 180 | Senior (redshirt) | Glenn Dale, MD | Ohio |

Wisconsin incoming transfers
| Name | Number | Pos. | Height | Weight | Year | Hometown | Previous team |
|---|---|---|---|---|---|---|---|
| Tyrell Henry | #2 | WR | 6'0 | 160 | Sophomore | Roseville, MI | Michigan State |
| John Pius | #8 | LB | 6'2 | 235 | Junior | Arlington, VA | William & Mary |
| Leon Lowery | #9 | DL | 6'3 | 215 | Sophomore (redshirt) | Elizabeth, NJ | Syracuse |
| Tyler Van Dyke | #9 | QB | 6'4 | 229 | Junior | Glastonbury, CT | Miami (FL) |
| Jackson McGohan | #83 | TE | 6'3.5 | 232 | Freshman | Miamisburg, OH | LSU |
| Cayson Pfeiffer | #96 | LS | 6'0 | 220 | Junior (redshirt) | Columbus, OH | Cincinnati |
| Sebastian Cheeks | #32 | LB | 6'2 | 230 | Freshman (redshirt) | Skokie, IL | North Carolina |
| Tawee Walker | #29 | RB | 5'9 | 216 | Junior | North Las Vegas, NV | Oklahoma |
| Jaheim Thomas | #28 | LB | 6'4 | 240 | Junior (redshirt) | Cincinnati, OH | Arkansas |
| RJ Delancey III | #4 | CB | 6'0 | 180 | Junior | Miami, FL | Toledo |
| Elijah Hills | #93 | DL | 6'1 | 275 | Junior | Rockaway, NJ | Albany |
| Tackett Curtis | #25 | LB | 6'2 | 225 | Freshman | Many, LA | USC |
| Leyton Nelson | #57 | OL | 6'6 | 308 | Junior | Orlando, FL | Vanderbilt |
| Joseph Griffin Jr. | #2 | WR | 6'3 | 199 | Sophomore | Springfield, MA | Boston College |
| Brandon Lane | #95 | DL | 6'3 | 300 | Sophomore (redshirt) | Kansas City, MO | Stephen F. Austin |
| Joey Okla | #65 | OL | 6'2 | 320 | Freshman (redshirt) | Hartland, WI | Illinois |

== Preseason ==
=== Preseason Big Ten poll ===
Although the Big Ten Conference has not held an official preseason poll since 2010, Cleveland.com has polled sports journalists representing all member schools as a de facto preseason media poll since 2011. For the 2024 poll, Wisconsin was projected to finish seventh overall in the Big Ten standings.

== Schedule ==
| Date | Time | Opponent | Site | TV | Result | Attendance |
|---|---|---|---|---|---|---|
| August 30 | 8:00 p.m. | Western Michigan* | Camp Randall Stadium; Madison, WI | FS1 | W 28–14 | 75,158 |
| September 7 | 2:30 p.m. | No. 6 (FCS) South Dakota* | Camp Randall Stadium; Madison, WI | FS1 | W 27–13 | 76,069 |
| September 14 | 11:00 a.m. | No. 4 Alabama* | Camp Randall Stadium; Madison, WI (Big Noon Kickoff) | FOX | L 10–42 | 76,323 |
| September 28 | 2:30 p.m. | at No. 13 USC | Los Angeles Memorial Coliseum; Los Angeles, CA | CBS | L 21–38 | 74,118 |
| October 5 | 11:00 a.m. | Purdue^{†} | Camp Randall Stadium; Madison, WI | BTN | W 52–6 | 76,091 |
| October 12 | 11:00 a.m. | at Rutgers | SHI Stadium; Piscataway, NJ | BTN | W 42–7 | 50,111 |
| October 19 | 11:00 a.m. | at Northwestern | Martin Stadium; Evanston, IL | BTN | W 23–3 | 12,023 |
| October 26 | 6:30 p.m. | No. 3 Penn State | Camp Randall Stadium; Madison, WI | NBC | L 13–28 | 76,403 |
| November 2 | 6:30 p.m. | at Iowa | Kinnick Stadium; Iowa City, IA (Heartland Trophy) | NBC | L 10–42 | 69,250 |
| November 16 | 6:30 p.m. | No. 1 Oregon | Camp Randall Stadium; Madison, WI | NBC | L 13–16 | 76,298 |
| November 23 | 2:30 p.m. | at Nebraska | Memorial Stadium; Lincoln, NE (Freedom Trophy) | BTN | L 25–44 | 86,923 |
| November 29 | 11:00 a.m. | Minnesota | Camp Randall Stadium; Madison, WI (Paul Bunyan's Axe) | CBS | L 7–24 | 76,059 |
*Non-conference game; ^{†}Homecoming; Rankings from AP Poll - Released prior to game; All times are in Central time; Source:

== Personnel ==
=== Roster ===
2024 Wisconsin Badgers football team roster
Players
Coaches
Offense

| Pos. | # | Name | Class |
|---|---|---|---|
| RB | 1 | Chez Mellusi | GS |
| WR | 2 | Trech Kekahuna | Fr |
| RB | 3 | Tawee Walker | Sr |
| WR | 4 | C. J. Williams | Jr |
| WR | 5 | Quincy Burroughs | So |
| WR | 6 | Will Pauling | Jr |
| RB | 7 | Dilin Jones | Fr |
| WR | 8 | Vinny Anthony II | Jr |
| WR | 9 | Bryson Green | Sr |
| QB | 10 | Tyler Van Dyke (injured) | Sr |
| QB | 11 | Mabrey Mettauer | Fr |
| WR | 12 | Joseph Griffin Jr. | Jr |
| RB | 13 | Darrion Dupree | Fr |
| WR | 14 | Tyrell Henry | Jr |
| QB | 16 | Milos Spasojevic | Fr |
| QB | 17 | Cole LaCrue | Fr |
| QB | 18 | Braedyn Locke | So |
| WR | 19 | Langdon Nordgaard | Fr |
| RB | 20 | Nate White | Fr |
| WR | 21 | Cam Fane | So |
| WR | 22 | Kyan Berry-Johnson | Fr |
| WR | 23 | Davion Thomas-Kumpula | Fr |
| RB | 25 | Cade Yacamelli | So |
| WR | 26 | Grady O'Neill | So |
| WR | 27 | Haakon Anderson | Sr |
| WR | 30 | Alex Moeller | Jr |
| RB | 31 | Gideon Ituka | Fr |
| RB | 34 | Jackson Acker | Jr |
| TE | 37 | Riley Nowakowski | Sr |
| TE | 38 | Tucker Ashcraft | So |
| TE | 41 | J. T. Seagreaves | So |
| RB | 43 | Grover Bortolotti | Jr |
| RB | 44 | Zach Gloudeman | So |
| OL | 50 | Ryan Cory | Fr |
| OL | 55 | Kevin Heywood | Fr |
| OL | 56 | Joe Brunner | So |
| OL | 57 | Jake Renfro | Sr |
| OL | 58 | Manny Mullens | Jr |
| OL | 60 | Joe Huber | Sr |
| OL | 61 | Joey Okla | So |
| OL | 64 | Evan Brown | Fr |
| OL | 65 | James Durand | Fr |
| OL | 66 | Leyton Nelson | Jr |
| OL | 67 | J. P. Benzschawel | Jr |
| OL | 70 | Barrett Nelson | So |
| OL | 71 | Riley Mahlman | Jr |
| OL | 73 | Kerry Kodanko | Sr |
| OL | 74 | Derek Jensen | Fr |
| OL | 75 | Emerson Mandell | Fr |
| OL | 76 | John Clifford | So |
| OL | 77 | Peyton Lange | Fr |
| OL | 78 | Colin Cubberly | Fr |
| OL | 79 | Jack Nelson | Sr |
| WR | 84 | Chris Brooks Jr. | So |
| TE | 85 | Grant Stec | Fr |
| TE | 87 | Jackson McGohan | So |
| TE | 89 | Rob Booker II | Fr |

Defense

| Pos. | # | Name | Class |
|---|---|---|---|
| OLB | 0 | John Pius | Sr |
| ILB | 1 | Jake Chaney | Sr |
| CB | 2 | Ricardo Hallman | Jr |
| CB | 3 | Nyzier Fourqurean | Sr |
| LB | 4 | Tackett Curtis | So |
| CB | 5 | R. J. Delancy III | Sr |
| CB | 6 | Xavier Lucas | Fr |
| LB | 7 | Jaheim Thomas | Sr |
| OLB | 8 | Leon Lowery Jr. | Sr |
| S | 9 | Austin Brown | Jr |
| CB | 11 | Omillio Agard | Fr |
| CB | 12 | Max Lofy | Sr |
| S | 13 | Kamo'i Latu | GS |
| S | 14 | Preston Zachman | Sr |
| LB | 15 | Sebastian Cheeks | So |
| CB | 16 | Amare Snowden | Fr |
| OLB | 17 | Darryl Peterson | Jr |
| S | 18 | Owen Arnett | Jr |
| OLB | 19 | Thomas Heiberger | Fr |
| S | 20 | Braedyn Moore | Fr |
| CB | 21 | Jonas Duclona | So |
| CB | 22 | Jace Arnold | Fr |
| LB | 23 | Landon Gauthier | Fr |
| S | 24 | Hunter Wohler | Sr |
| S | 25 | Justin Taylor | Fr |
| CB | 26 | Jay Harper | Fr |
| S | 27 | Raphael Dunn | Fr |
| LB | 28 | Christian Alliegro | So |
| OLB | 30 | Angel Toombs | Fr |
| S | 34 | Charlie Jarvis | So |
| S | 38 | Mason Lane | Fr |
| ILB | 42 | Tyler Jansey | Fr |
| S | 43 | Jackson Trudgeon | So |
| LB | 45 | Garrison Solliday | Jr |
| S | 45 | Brandon Shepherd | Jr |
| OLB | 46 | Tamer Dalloul | Fr |
| LB | 47 | Evan Van Dyn Hoven | Fr |
| OLB | 51 | Anelu Lafaele | Fr |
| LB | 55 | Drew Braam | Fr |
| OLB | 56 | Cody Raymond | Fr |
| OLB | 59 | Aaron Witt | Jr |
| DL | 60 | Hank Weber | Fr |
| DL | 68 | Ben Barten | Sr |
| DL | 76 | Dillan Johnson | Fr |
| DL | 77 | Will McDonald | Fr |
| DL | 85 | Nolan Vils | Fr |
| DL | 90 | James Thompson Jr. | Sr |
| DL | 91 | Jamel Howard | Fr |
| DL | 92 | Curt Neal | So |
| DL | 93 | Ernest Willor Jr. | Fr |
| DL | 94 | Elijah Hills | Sr |
| DL | 95 | Brandon Lane | Jr |
| DL | 96 | Cade McDonald | Sr |

Special teams

| Pos. | # | Name | Class |
|---|---|---|---|
| P | 28 | Gavin Meyers | Sr |
| K | 29 | Nate Van Zelst | Jr |
| P | 49 | Atticus Bertrams | So |
| LS | 54 | Deed Capper | Fr |
| LS | 64 | Duncan McKinley | Sr |
| K | 90 | Nathanial Vakos | Jr |
| K | 91 | Sean West | Fr |
| K | 97 | Gavin Lahm | Jr |
| K | 98 | Gianni Smith | Sr |
| LS | 99 | Cayson Pfeiffer | GS |

Head coach

- Luke Fickell

Coordinators/assistant coaches

- Phil Longo – Offensive coordinator/quarterbacks
- Mike Tressel – Defensive coordinator/inside linebackers
- Alex Grinch – Co-defensive coordinator/safeties
- Matt Mitchell – Special teams coordinator/outside linebackers
- A. J. Blazek – Offensive linemen
- Kenny Guiton – Wide receivers
- Paul Haynes – Cornerbacks
- Nate Letton – Tight ends
- Devon Spalding – Running backs
- E. J. Whitlow – Defensive linemen
- Jack Cooper – Assistant defensive backs
- Casey Rabach – Assistant offensive linemen
- Eric Raisbeck – Assistant special teams coordinator
- Lee Rose – Senior offensive analyst
- Zach Patterson – Offensive quality control
- Tuf Borland – Graduate assistant
- Cooper Eckhardt – Graduate assistant
- Zack Heeman – Graduate assistant
- Daeshon Martin – Graduate assistant

Legend

- (C) Team captain
- (S) Suspended
- (I) Ineligible
- Injured
- Redshirt

Roster
Last update: 9/14/24

=== Coaching staff ===
Wisconsin football current coaching staff
| Name | Position | Alma mater | Years at Wisconsin |
|---|---|---|---|
| Luke Fickell | Head coach | Ohio State University | 2nd |
| Phil Longo | Offensive coordinator/quarterbacks | Rowan University | 2nd |
| Mike Tressel | Defensive coordinator/inside linebackers | Cornell College (IA) | 2nd |
| Alex Grinch | Co-defensive coordinator/safeties | University of Mount Union | 1st |
| AJ Blazek | Offensive line | University of Iowa | 1st |
| Kenny Guiton | Wide receivers | Ohio State University | 1st |
| Devon Spalding | Running backs | Central Michigan University | 2nd |
| Nate Letton | Tight ends | Centre College | 2nd |
| Paul Haynes | Cornerbacks | Kent State University | 2nd |
| E.J. Whitlow | Defensive line | University of Findlay | 1st |
| Matt Mitchell | Special teams coordinator/outside linebackers | Cornell College (IA) | 2nd |
| Greg Gillum | Chief of staff | Ohio State University | 2nd |
| Pat Lambert | Director of recruiting | University of Cincinnati | 2nd |
| Max Stienecker | Director of player personnel | University of Cincinnati | 2nd |
| Brady Collins | Director of football strength & conditioning | University of Kentucky | 2nd |
| Jack Del Rio | Senior adviser to the head coach | University of Southern California | 1st |

== Game summaries ==
=== Western Michigan ===
Western Michigan Broncos (0–0) vs. Wisconsin Badgers (0–0) – Game summary

| Quarter | 1 | 2 | 3 | 4 | Total |
|---|---|---|---|---|---|
| Broncos | 0 | 7 | 0 | 7 | 14 |
| Badgers | 0 | 10 | 3 | 15 | 28 |

at Camp Randall Stadium, Madison, Wisconsin

- Date: Friday August 30, 2024
- Game time: 8:00 p.m.
- Game weather: Cloudy, 71 °F (22 °C); Wind: NW 6 mph
- Game attendance: 75,158
- Referee: Greg Sujack
- TV announcers (FS1): Tim Brando (play-by-play), Devin Gardner (analyst), and Josh Sims (sideline)

Game information

First quarter

No scoring

Second quarter

- WIS – Chez Mellusi 9-yard run (Nathanial Vakos kick), 11:48 Wisconsin 7–0 Drive: 16 plays, 93 yards, 6:29.
- WMU – Jalen Buckley 1-yard run (Palmer Domschke kick), 3:02 Tied 7–7 Drive: 16 plays, 78 yards, 8:40.
- WIS – Nathanial Vakos 33-yard field goal, 13:45. Wisconsin 10–7. Drive: 14 plays, 68 yards, 2:58.

Third quarter

- WIS – Nathanial Vakos 23-yard field goal, 7:56. Wisconsin 13–7. Drive: 14 plays, 59 yards, 6:55.

Fourth quarter

- WMU – Jalen Buckley 1-yard run (Palmer Domschke kick), 14:15 Western Michigan 14–13 Drive: 6 plays, 34 yards, 2:51.
- WIS – Tawee Walker 6-yard run (Trech Kekahuna pass from Tyler Van Dyke), 10:35 Wisconsin 21–14 Drive: 4 plays, 20 yards, 1:46.
- WIS – Tyler Van Dyke 6-yard run (Nathanial Vakos kick), 3:17 Wisconsin 28–14 Drive: 8 plays, 50 yards, 4:37.

Top passers

- WIS – Tyler Van Dyke – 21/36, 192 yards
- WMU – Hayden Wolff – 12/18, 141 yards, INT

Top rushers

- WIS – Chez Mellusi – 19 rushes, 74 yards, TD
- WMU – Jalen Buckley – 16 rushes, 64 yards, 2 TD

Top receivers

- WIS – Will Pauling – 6 receptions, 60 yards
- WMU – Malique Dieudonne – 2 receptions, 45 yards

Top defenders

- WIS – Hunter Wohler – 7 tackles, pass breakup
- WMU – Donald Willis – 10 tackles, TFL, 2 pass breakups

=== No. 6 (FCS) South Dakota ===
No. 6 (FCS) South Dakota Coyotes (1–0) vs. Wisconsin Badgers (1–0)– Game summary

| Quarter | 1 | 2 | 3 | 4 | Total |
|---|---|---|---|---|---|
| No. 6 (FCS) Coyotes | 0 | 3 | 10 | 0 | 13 |
| Badgers | 14 | 3 | 3 | 7 | 27 |

at Camp Randall Stadium, Madison, Wisconsin

- Date: September 7, 2024
- Game time: 2:30 p.m.
- Game weather: Sunny, 62 °F (17 °C); Wind: N 9 mph
- Game attendance: 76,069
- Referee: David Siegle
- TV announcers (FS1): Eric Collins (play-by-play) and Spencer Tillman (analyst)

Game information

First quarter

- WIS – Chez Mellusi 9-yard run (Nathanial Vakos kick), 12:03 Wisconsin 7–0 Drive: 7 plays, 75 yards, 2:52.
- WIS – CJ Williams 50-yard pass from Tyler Van Dyke (Nathanial Vakos kick), 4:48 Wisconsin 14–0 Drive: 3 plays, 58 yards, 1:23.

Second quarter

- SD – Will Leyland 25-yard field goal, 7:14. Wisconsin 14–3. Drive: 11 plays, 57 yards, 5:48.
- WIS – Nathanial Vakos 24-yard field goal, 0:07. Wisconsin 17–3. Drive: 13 plays, 68 yards, 6:56.

Third quarter

- SD – Keyondray Jones-Logan 35-yard run (Will Leyland kick), 12:38 Wisconsin 17–10 Drive: 4 plays, 75 yards, 2:22.
- SD – Will Leyland 32-yard field goal, 5:06. Wisconsin 17–13. Drive: 5 plays, -7 yards, 1:44.
- WIS – Nathanial Vakos 50-yard field goal, 2:21. Wisconsin 20–13. Drive: 7 plays, 49 yards, 2:34.

Fourth quarter

- WIS – Chez Mellusi 1-yard run (Nathanial Vakos kick), 7:41 Wisconsin 27–13 Drive: 11 plays, 85 yards, 4:51.

Top passers

- WIS – Tyler Van Dyke – 17/27, 214 yards, TD
- SD – Aidan Bouman – 12/23, 114 yards

Top rushers

- WIS – Chez Mellusi – 16 rushes, 60 yards, 2 TD
- SD – Charles Pierre Jr. – 12 rushes, 83 yards

Top receivers

- WIS – CJ Williams – 2 receptions, 53 yards, TD
- SD – Travis Theis – 4 receptions, 43 yards

Top defenders

- WIS – Hunter Wohler – 8 tackles, pass breakup
- SD – Nick Gaes – 10 tackles, 2 TFL, sack, pass breakup

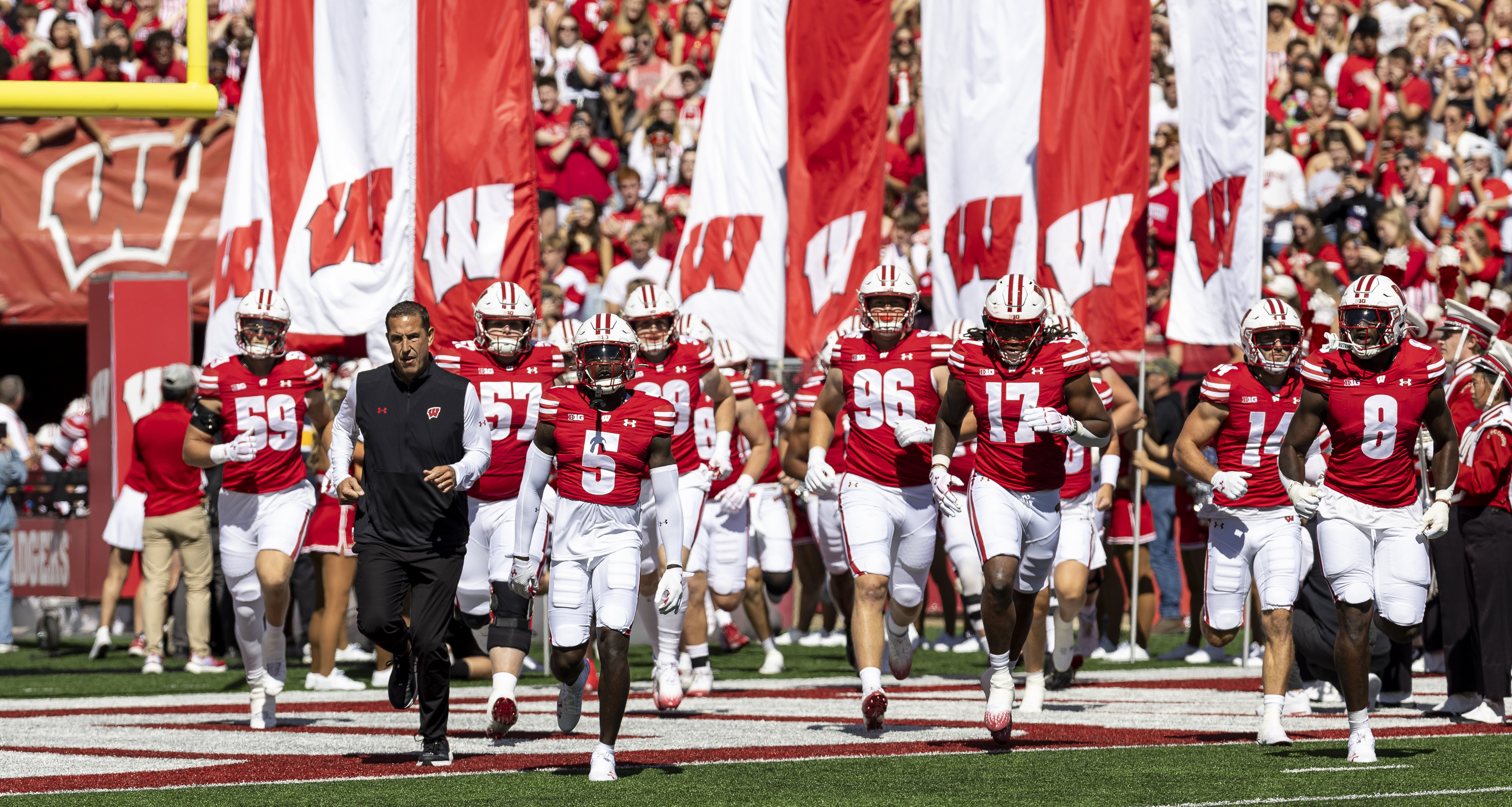
Wisconsin players enter the field for their game against South Dakota

=== No. 4 Alabama ===
No. 4 Alabama Crimson Tide (2–0) vs. Wisconsin Badgers (2–0) – Game summary

| Quarter | 1 | 2 | 3 | 4 | Total |
|---|---|---|---|---|---|
| No. 4 Crimson Tide | 7 | 14 | 14 | 7 | 42 |
| Badgers | 3 | 0 | 7 | 0 | 10 |

at Camp Randall Stadium, Madison, Wisconsin

- Date: September 14, 2024
- Game time: 11:00 a.m.
- Game weather: Cloudy, 75 °F (24 °C); Wind: SE 7 mph
- Game attendance: 76,323
- Referee: Ron Snodgrass
- TV announcers (FOX): Gus Johnson (play-by-play), Joel Klatt (analyst), and Jenny Taft (sideline)

Game information

First quarter

- WIS – Nathanial Vakos 53-yard field goal, 9:51. Wisconsin 3–0. Drive: 10 plays, 40 yards, 4:59.
- ALA – Ryan Coleman-Williams 31-yard pass from Jalen Milroe (Graham Nicholson kick), 0:20 Alabama 7–3 Drive: 4 plays, 60 yards, 1:23.

Second quarter

- ALA – Jalen Milroe 3-yard run (Graham Nicholson kick), 9:43 Alabama 14–3 Drive: 7 plays, 28 yards, 3:22.
- ALA – Germie Bernard 26-yard pass from Jalen Milroe (Graham Nicholson kick), 0:19 Alabama 21–3 Drive: 2 plays, 73 yards, 0:17.

Third quarter

- ALA – Jamarion Miller 34-yard run (Graham Nicholson kick), 12:40 Alabama 28–3 Drive: 5 plays, 75 yards, 2:20.
- WIS – Will Pauling 3-yard pass from Braedyn Locke (Nathanial Vakos kick), 4:26 Alabama 28–10 Drive: 17 plays, 75 yards, 8:14.
- ALA – Jalen Milroe 10-yard run (Graham Nicholson kick), 1:11 Alabama 35–10 Drive: 3 plays, 18 yards, 1:09.

Fourth quarter

- ALA – Josh Cuevas 37-yard pass from Jalen Milroe (Graham Nicholson kick), 10:05 Alabama 42–10 Drive: 1 play, 37 yards, 0:08.

Top passers

- WIS – Braedyn Locke – 13/26, 125 yards, TD
- ALA – Jalen Milroe – 12/17, 196 yards, 3 TD

Top rushers

- WIS – Chez Mellusi – 11 rushes, 66 yards
- ALA – Jalen Milroe – 14 carries, 75 yards, 2 TD

Top receivers

- WIS – Will Pauling – 9 receptions, 83 yards, TD
- ALA – Ryan Coleman-Williams – 4 receptions, 78 yards, TD

Top defenders

- WIS – Leon Lowery – 5 tackles, TFL, sack
- ALA – Deontae Lawson – 7 tackles, forced fumble, pass breakup

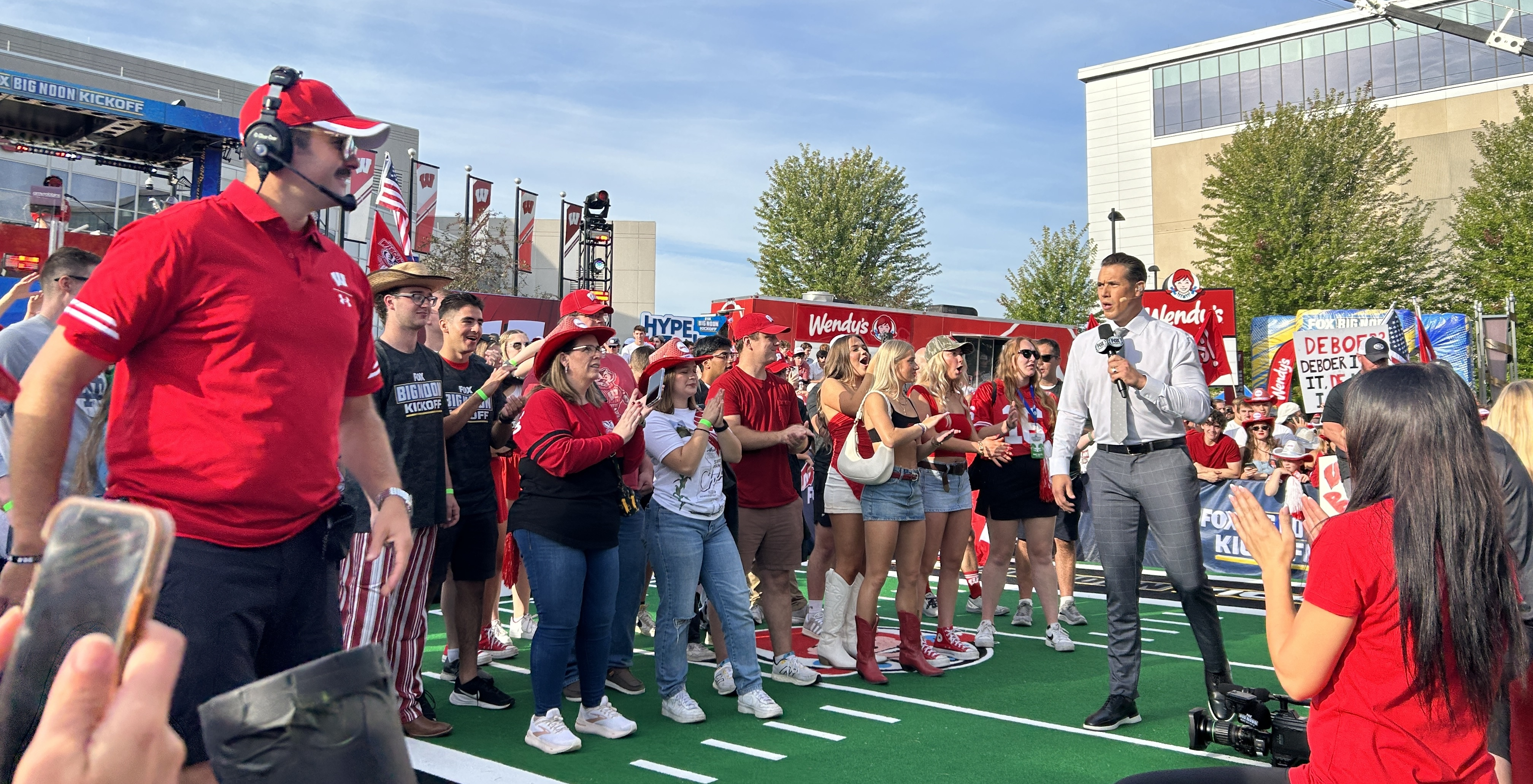
Wisconsin fans join Brady Quinn outside of the Kohl Center for an on-campus taping of Fox Big Noon Kickoff prior to the game against Alabama

=== at No. 13 USC ===
Wisconsin Badgers (2–1) vs. No. 13 USC Trojans (2–1) – Game summary

| Quarter | 1 | 2 | 3 | 4 | Total |
|---|---|---|---|---|---|
| Badgers | 7 | 14 | 0 | 0 | 21 |
| No. 13 Trojans | 7 | 3 | 14 | 14 | 38 |

at Los Angeles Memorial Coliseum, Los Angeles, California

- Date: September 28, 2024
- Game time: 2:30 p.m.
- Game weather: Sunny, 74 °F (23 °C); Wind: N 5 mph
- Game attendance: 74,118
- Referee: Larry Smith
- TV announcers (CBS): Brad Nessler (play-by-play), Gary Danielson (analyst), and Jenny Dell (sideline)

Game information

First quarter

- USC – Ja'Kobi Lane 32-yard pass from Miller Moss (Michael Lantz kick), 12:23 USC 7–0 Drive: 6 plays, 75 yards, 2:37.
- WIS – Vinny Anthony 63-yard pass from Braedyn Locke (Nathanial Vakos kick), 10:52 Tie 7–7 Drive: 4 plays, 75 yards, 1:31.

Second quarter

- WIS – Tawee Walker 18-yard run (Nathanial Vakos kick), 14:44 Wisconsin 14–7 Drive: 1 play, 18 yards, 0:06.
- USC – Michael Lantz 41-yard field goal, 9:43. Wisconsin 14–10. Drive: 8 plays, 41 yards, 5:01.
- WIS – Tawee Walker 4-yard run (Nathanial Vakos kick), 6:29 Wisconsin 21–10 Drive: 7 plays, 75 yards, 3:14.

Third quarter

- USC – Ja'Kobi Lane 6-yard pass from Miller Moss (Michael Lantz kick), 9:18 Wisconsin 21–17 Drive: 9 plays, 30 yards, 3:33.
- USC – Duce Robinson 8-yard pass from Miller Moss (Michael Lantz kick), 1:28 USC 24–21 Drive: 9 plays, 67 yards, 4:16.

Fourth quarter

- USC – Miller Moss 7-yard run (Michael Lantz kick), 8:22 USC 31–21 Drive: 10 plays, 77 yards, 6:29.
- USC – Mason Cobb 55-yard interception return (Michael Lantz kick), 5:10 USC 38–21

Top passers

- WIS – Braedyn Locke – 13/26, 180 yards, TD, INT
- USC – Miller Moss – 30/45, 308 yards, 3 TD, INT

Top rushers

- WIS – Tawee Walker – 12 rushes, 55 yards, 2 TD
- USC – Woody Marks – 19 carries, 63 yards

Top receivers

- WIS – Vinny Anthony – 3 receptions, 70 yards, TD
- USC – Ja'Kobi Lane – 10 receptions, 105 yards, 2 TD

Top defenders

- WIS – Austin Brown – 9 tackles, 2 TFL, sack, forced fumble, pass breakup
- USC – Kamari Ramsey – 4 tackles, 2 TFL

=== Purdue ===
Purdue Boilermakers (1–3) vs. Wisconsin Badgers (2–2) – Game summary

| Quarter | 1 | 2 | 3 | 4 | Total |
|---|---|---|---|---|---|
| Boilermakers | 0 | 6 | 0 | 0 | 6 |
| Badgers | 14 | 7 | 21 | 10 | 52 |

at Camp Randall Stadium, Madison, Wisconsin

- Date: October 5, 2024
- Game time: 11:00 a.m.
- Game weather: Sunny, 65 °F (18 °C); Wind: SE 14 mph
- Game attendance: 76,091
- Referee: Chris Coyte
- TV announcers (BTN): Mark Followill (play-by-play), Jake Butt (analyst), and Brooke Fletcher (sideline)

Game information

First quarter

- WIS – Tawee Walker 12-yard run (Nathanial Vakos kick), 8:04 Wisconsin 7–0 Drive: 1 play, 12 yards, 0:05.
- WIS – Vinny Anthony 52-yard pass from Braedyn Locke (Nathanial Vakos kick), 1:56 Wisconsin 14–0 Drive: 6 plays, 91 yards, 2:30.

Second quarter

- PUR – Spencer Porath 21-yard field goal, 8:41. Wisconsin 14–3. Drive: 9 plays, 42 yards, 6:08.
- PUR – Spencer Porath 23-yard field goal, 3:27. Wisconsin 14–6. Drive: 8 plays, 46 yards, 3:27.
- WIS – Tawee Walker 1-yard run (Nathanial Vakos kick), 0:09 Wisconsin 21–6 Drive: 11 plays, 75 yards, 3:18.

Third quarter

- WIS – Trech Kekahuna 69-yard pass from Braedyn Locke (Nathanial Vakos kick), 12:14 Wisconsin 28–6 Drive: 5 plays, 75 yards, 2:46.
- WIS – Trech Kekahuna 25-yard pass from Braedyn Locke (Nathanial Vakos kick), 4:42 Wisconsin 35–6 Drive: 9 plays, 98 yards, 4:39.
- WIS – Tawee Walker 17-yard run (Nathanial Vakos kick), 0:12 Wisconsin 42–6 Drive: 9 plays, 78 yards, 3:41.

Fourth quarter

- WIS – Cade Yacamelli 30-yard run (Nathanial Vakos kick), 10:59 Wisconsin 49–6 Drive: 5 plays, 60 yards, 2:40.
- WIS – Nathanial Vakos 26-yard field goal, 6:15. Wisconsin 52–6. Drive: 7 plays, 51 yards, 4:27.

Top passers

- WIS – Braedyn Locke – 20/31, 359 yards, 3 TD, 2 INT
- PUR – Hudson Card – 11/21, 111 yards

Top rushers

- WIS – Tawee Walker – 19 rushes, 94 yards, 3 TD
- PUR – Devin Mockobee – 11 carries, 45 yards

Top receivers

- WIS – Trech Kekahuna – 6 receptions, 134 yards, 2 TD
- PUR – Jahmal Edrine – 2 receptions, 26 yards

Top defenders

- WIS – Jaheim Thomas – 6 tackles, TFL, sack
- PUR – Dillon Thieneman – 8 tackles, TFL, pass breakup

=== at Rutgers ===
Wisconsin Badgers (3–2) vs. Rutgers Scarlet Knights (4–1) – Game summary

| Quarter | 1 | 2 | 3 | 4 | Total |
|---|---|---|---|---|---|
| Badgers | 14 | 0 | 14 | 14 | 42 |
| Scarlet Knights | 0 | 0 | 0 | 7 | 7 |

at SHI Stadium, Piscataway, New Jersey

- Date: October 12, 2024
- Game time: 11:00 a.m.
- Game weather: Sunny, 74 °F (23 °C); Wind: NW 14 mph
- Game attendance: 50,111
- Referee: Mark Kluczynski
- TV announcers (BTN): Jeff Levering (play-by-play), Jake Butt (analyst), and Brooke Fletcher (sideline)

Game information

First quarter

- WIS – Will Pauling 16-yard pass from Braedyn Locke (Nathanial Vakos kick), 9:10 Wisconsin 7–0 Drive: 8 plays, 89 yards, 3:08.
- WIS – Tawee Walker 2-yard run (Nathanial Vakos kick), 1:39 Wisconsin 14–0 Drive: 7 plays, 53 yards, 3:25.

Second quarter

No scoring

Third quarter

- WIS – Darrion Dupree 2-yard run (Nathanial Vakos kick), 8:14 Wisconsin 21–0 Drive: 4 plays, 89 yards, 1:45.
- WIS – Tawee Walker 9-yard run (Nathanial Vakos kick), 4:45 Wisconsin 28–0 Drive: 6 plays, 31 yards, 3:21.

Fourth quarter

- RUT – Kyle Monangai 13-yard run (Jai Patel kick), 13:48 Wisconsin 28–7 Drive: 13 plays, 80 yards, 3:25.
- WIS – Tawee Walker 55-yard run (Nathanial Vakos kick), 11:11 Wisconsin 35–7 Drive: 4 plays, 68 yards, 2:37.
- WIS – Braedyn Locke 1-yard run (Nathanial Vakos kick), 4:47 Wisconsin 42–7 Drive: 9 plays, 80 yards, 5:25.

Top passers

- WIS – Braedyn Locke – 20/28, 240 yards, TD, INT
- RUT – Athan Kaliakmanis – 12/32, 103 yards, INT

Top rushers

- WIS – Tawee Walker – 24 rushes, 198 yards, 3 TD
- RUT – Kyle Monangai – 19 carries, 72 yards, TD

Top receivers

- WIS – Will Pauling – 4 receptions, 49 yards, TD
- RUT – Christian Dremel – 2 receptions, 54 yards

Top defenders

- WIS – Preston Zachman – 10 tackles, 1.5 TFL, INT
- RUT – Dariel Djabome – 12 tackles, 0.5 TFL, forced fumble

=== at Northwestern ===
Wisconsin (4–2) vs. Northwestern (3–3) – Game summary

| Quarter | 1 | 2 | 3 | 4 | Total |
|---|---|---|---|---|---|
| Badgers | 0 | 14 | 7 | 2 | 23 |
| Wildcats | 0 | 0 | 3 | 0 | 3 |

at Martin Stadium, Evanston, Illinois

- Date: October 19, 2024
- Game time: 11:00 a.m.
- Game weather: Sunny, 61 °F (16 °C); Wind: SW 10 mph
- Game attendance: 12,023
- Referee: Kole Knueppel
- TV announcers (BTN): Jeff Levering (play-by-play), Jake Butt (analyst), and Brooke Fletcher (sideline)

Game information

First quarter

No scoring

Second quarter

- WIS – Braedyn Locke 8-yard run (Nathanial Vakos kick), 14:31 Wisconsin 7–0 Drive: 8 plays, 66 yards, 3:32.
- WIS – Cade Yacamelli 3-yard run (Nathanial Vakos kick), 0:39 Wisconsin 14–0 Drive: 1 play, 3 yards, 0:04.

Third quarter

- NU – Luke Akers 26-yard field goal, 6:46. Wisconsin 14–3. Drive: 13 plays, 59 yards, 7:18.
- WIS – Tucker Ashcraft 3-yard pass from Braedyn Locke (Nathanial Vakos kick), 0:11 Wisconsin 21–3 Drive: 8 plays, 80 yards, 4:28.

Fourth quarter

- WIS – Jack Lausch sacked 9-yard loss for safety, 14:52 Wisconsin 23–3

Top passers

- WIS – Braedyn Locke – 14/24, 160 yards, TD, INT
- NU – Jack Lausch – 9/24, 82 yards

Top rushers

- WIS – Tawee Walker – 23 rushes, 126 yards
- NU – Jack Lausch – 10 carries, 55 yards

Top receivers

- WIS – Will Pauling – 5 receptions, 51 yards
- NU – Thomas Gordon – 4 receptions, 49 yards

Top defenders

- WIS – Jake Chaney – 6 tackles, TFL
- NU – Greyson Metz – 8 tackles, TFL, sack, forced fumble, pass breakup

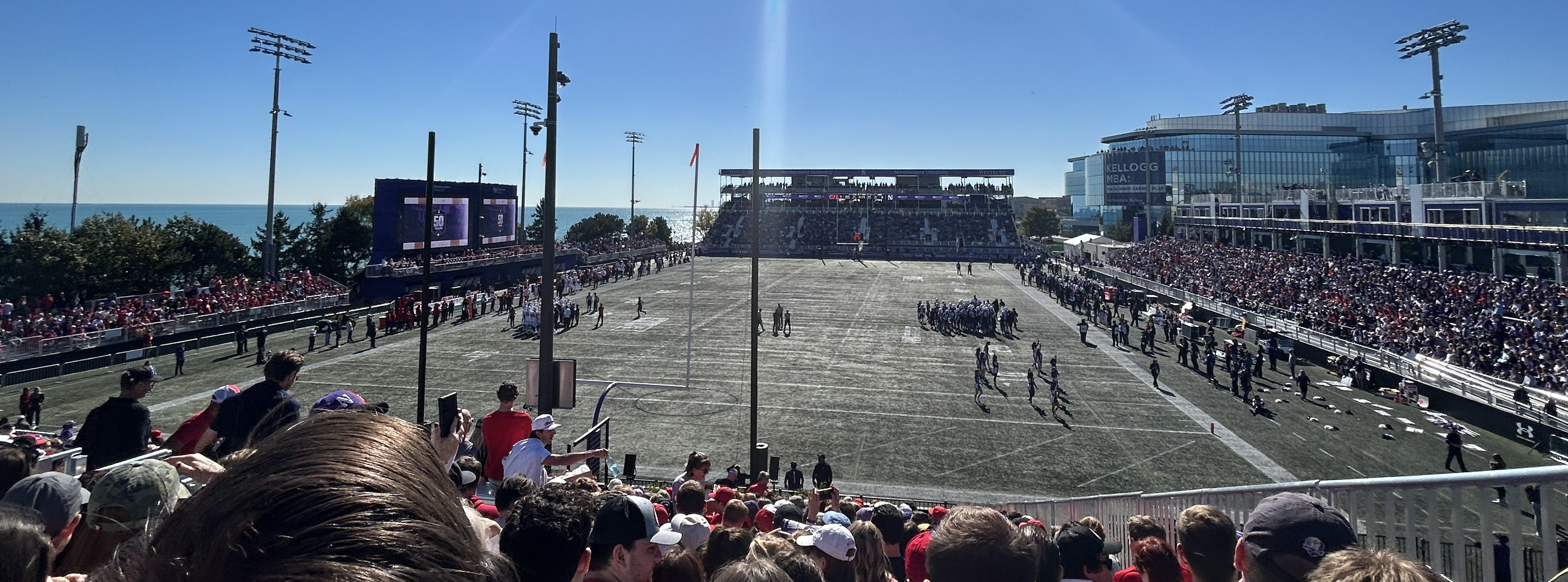
at Northwestern (Martin Stadium)

=== No. 3 Penn State ===
No. 3 Penn State (6–0) vs. Wisconsin (5–2) – Game summary

| Quarter | 1 | 2 | 3 | 4 | Total |
|---|---|---|---|---|---|
| No. 3 Nittany Lions | 0 | 7 | 7 | 14 | 28 |
| Badgers | 3 | 7 | 3 | 0 | 13 |

at Camp Randall Stadium, Madison, Wisconsin

- Date: October 26, 2024
- Game time: 6:30 p.m.
- Game weather: Clear, 49 °F (9 °C); Wind: N 2 mph
- Game attendance: 76,403
- Referee: Bryan Banks
- TV announcers (NBC): Noah Eagle (play-by-play), Todd Blackledge (analyst), and Kathryn Tappen (sideline)

Game information

First quarter

- WIS – Nathanial Vakos 50-yard field goal, 11:05. Wisconsin 3–0. Drive: 12 plays, 42 yards, 3:55.

Second quarter

- PSU – Nicholas Singleton 6-yard pass from Drew Allar (Ryan Barker kick), 14:37 Penn State 7–3 Drive: 9 plays, 90 yards, 3:01.
- WIS – Tawee Walker 1-yard run (Nathanial Vakos kick), 1:23 Wisconsin 10–7 Drive: 10 plays, 73 yards, 2:41.

Third quarter

- PSU – Jaylen Reed 19-yard interception return (Ryan Barker kick), 6:29 Penn State 14–10
- WIS – Nathanial Vakos 32-yard field goal, 2:44. Penn State 14–13. Drive: 8 plays, 51 yards, 3:39.

Fourth quarter

- PSU – Khalil Dinkins 1-yard pass from Beau Pribula (Ryan Barker kick), 10:01 Penn State 21–13 Drive: 13 plays, 81 yards, 7:35.
- PSU – Kaytron Allen 24-yard run (Ryan Barker kick), 3:10 Penn State 28–13 Drive: 9 plays, 76 yards, 5:15.

Top passers

- WIS – Braedyn Locke – 22/42, 217 yards, INT
- PSU – Drew Allar – 14/18, 148 yards, TD

Top rushers

- WIS – Tawee Walker – 22 rushes, 59 yards, TD
- PSU – Kaytron Allen – 11 carries, 86 yards, TD

Top receivers

- WIS – Will Pauling – 8 receptions, 79 yards
- PSU – Harrison Wallace III – 5 receptions, 67 yards

Top defenders

- WIS – Hunter Wohler – 11 tackles
- PSU – Zakee Wheatley – 10 tackles

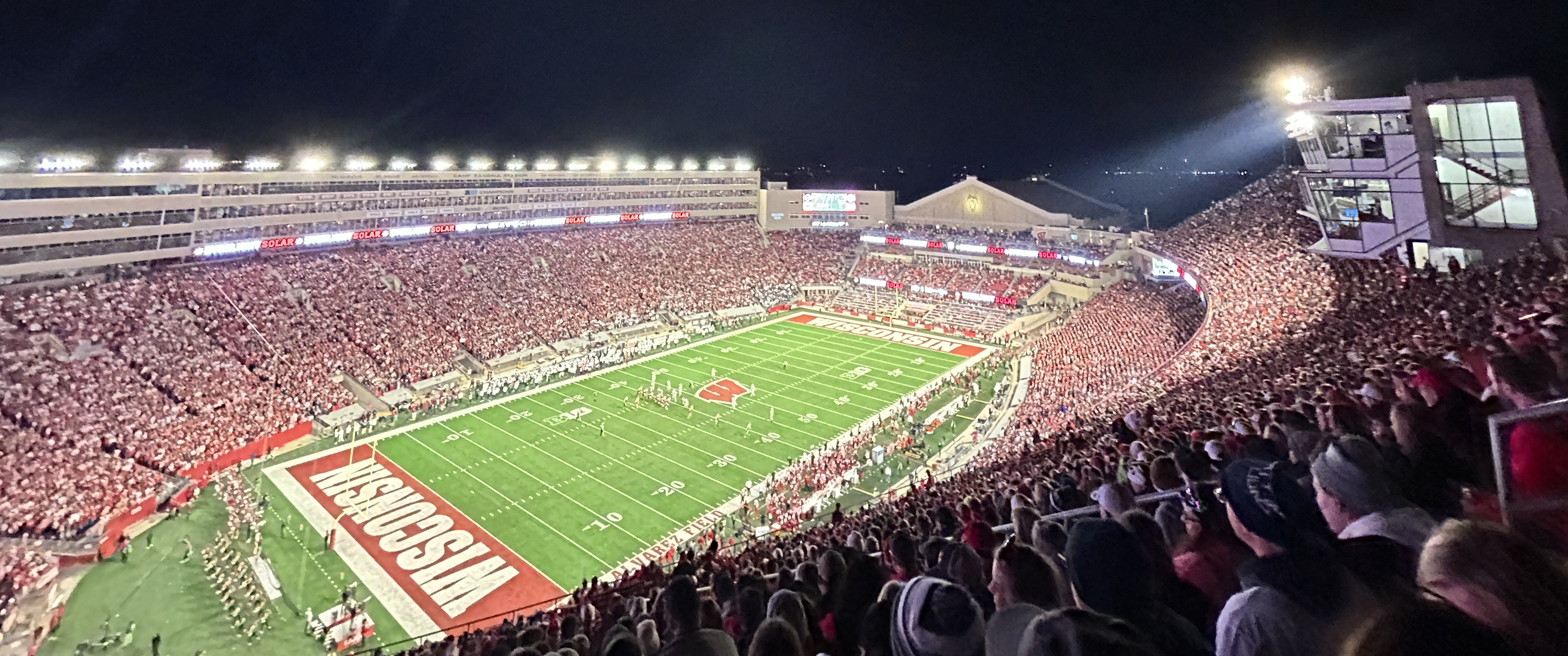
against Penn State

=== at Iowa ===
Wisconsin (5–3) vs. Iowa (5–3) – Game summary

| Quarter | 1 | 2 | 3 | 4 | Total |
|---|---|---|---|---|---|
| Badgers | 3 | 0 | 0 | 7 | 10 |
| Hawkeyes | 0 | 14 | 14 | 14 | 42 |

at Kinnick Stadium, Iowa City, Iowa

- Date: November 2, 2024
- Game time: 6:30 p.m.
- Game weather: Cloudy, 56 °F (13 °C); Wind: SE 8 mph
- Game attendance: 69,250
- Referee: Jeffrey Servinski
- TV announcers (NBC): Noah Eagle (play-by-play), Todd Blackledge (analyst), and Kathryn Tappen (sideline)

Game information

First quarter

- WIS – Nathanial Vakos 38-yard field goal, 6:15. Wisconsin 3–0. Drive: 12 plays, 59 yards, 6:29.

Second quarter

- IOWA – Brendan Sullivan 1-yard run (Drew Stevens kick), 12:49 Iowa 7–3 Drive: 7 plays, 53 yards, 2:58.
- IOWA – Kaleb Johnson 16-yard run (Drew Stevens kick), 8:49 Iowa 14–3 Drive: 6 plays, 80 yards, 2:55.

Third quarter

- IOWA – Kaleb Johnson 9-yard run (Drew Stevens kick), 6:24 Iowa 21–3 Drive: 10 plays, 86 yards, 5:34.
- IOWA – Jacob Gill 7-yard pass from Brendan Sullivan (Drew Stevens kick), 4:17 Iowa 28–3 Drive: 1 play, 12 yards, 0:18.

Fourth quarter

- WIS – CJ Williams 14-yard pass from Braedyn Locke (Nathanial Vakos kick), 14:12 Iowa 28–10 Drive: 10 plays, 79 yards, 4:59.
- IOWA – Kaleb Johnson 2-yard run (Drew Stevens kick), 9:42 Iowa 35–10 Drive: 8 plays, 77 yards, 4:24.
- IOWA – Jaziun Patterson 4-yard run (Drew Stevens kick), 1:15 Iowa 42–10 Drive: 12 plays, 66 yards, 7:13.

Top passers

- WIS – Braedyn Locke – 15/29, 137 yards, TD, 2 INT
- IOWA – Brendan Sullivan – 7/10, 93 yards, TD

Top rushers

- WIS – Darrion Dupree – 7 rushes, 52 yards
- IOWA – Kaleb Johnson – 24 carries, 135 yards, 3 TD

Top receivers

- WIS – Vinny Anthony II – 4 receptions, 61 yards
- IOWA – Zach Ortwerth – 3 receptions, 66 yards

Top defenders

- WIS – Christian Alliegro – 16 tackles, 1.5 TFL, sack
- IOWA – Nick Johnson – 8 tackles, INT

=== No. 1 Oregon ===
No. 1 Oregon (10–0) vs. Wisconsin (5–4) – Game summary

| Quarter | 1 | 2 | 3 | 4 | Total |
|---|---|---|---|---|---|
| No. 1 Ducks | 6 | 0 | 0 | 10 | 16 |
| Badgers | 0 | 10 | 3 | 0 | 13 |

at Camp Randall Stadium, Madison, Wisconsin

- Date: November 16, 2024
- Game time: 6:30 p.m.
- Game weather: Cloudy, 47 °F (8 °C); Wind: SE 14 mph
- Game attendance: 76,298
- Referee: Tim O'Dey
- TV announcers (NBC): Noah Eagle (play-by-play), Todd Blackledge (analyst), and Kathryn Tappen (sideline)

Game information

First quarter

- ORE – Atticus Sappington 35-yard field goal, 9:01. Oregon 3–0. Drive: 11 plays, 43 yards, 4:36.
- ORE – Atticus Sappington 42-yard field goal, 1:11. Oregon 6–0. Drive: 6 plays, 30 yards, 3:08.

Second quarter

- WIS – Nathanial Vakos 31-yard field goal, 10:19. Oregon 6–3. Drive: 13 plays, 56 yards, 5:52.
- WIS – Will Pauling 2-yard pass from Braedyn Locke (Nathanial Vakos kick), 0:25 Wisconsin 10–6 Drive: 9 plays, 75 yards, 2:40.

Third quarter

- WIS – Nathanial Vakos 35-yard field goal, 4:43. Wisconsin 13–6. Drive: 16 plays, 62 yards, 8:53.

Fourth quarter

- ORE – Jordan James 11-yard run (Atticus Sappington kick), 13:14 Tie 13–13 Drive: 13 plays, 81 yards, 6:24.
- ORE – Atticus Sappington 24-yard field goal, 2:36. Oregon 16–13. Drive: 9 plays, 37 yards, 4:13.

Top passers

- WIS – Braedyn Locke – 12/28, 96 yards, TD, INT
- ORE – Dillon Gabriel – 22/31, 218 yards, INT

Top rushers

- WIS – Tawee Walker – 20 rushes, 97 yards
- ORE – Jordan James – 25 carries, 121 yards, TD

Top receivers

- WIS – Vinny Anthony II – 4 receptions, 53 yards
- ORE – Evan Stewart – 10 receptions, 92 yards

Top defenders

- WIS – Hunter Wohler – 12 tackles
- ORE – Bryce Boettcher – 9 tackles, TFL, pass breakup

=== at Nebraska ===
Wisconsin (5–5) vs. Nebraska (5–5) – Game summary

| Quarter | 1 | 2 | 3 | 4 | Total |
|---|---|---|---|---|---|
| Badgers | 7 | 3 | 7 | 8 | 25 |
| Cornhuskers | 7 | 17 | 10 | 10 | 44 |

at Memorial Stadium, Lincoln, Nebraska

- Date: November 23, 2024
- Game time: 2:30 p.m
- Game weather: Sunny, 60 °F (16 °C); Wind: S 10 mph
- Game attendance: 86,923
- Referee: Rod Snodgrass
- TV announcers (BTN): Jeff Levering (play-by-play), Jake Butt (analyst), and Brooke Fletcher (sideline)

Game information

First quarter

- NEB – Heinrich Haarberg 5-yard run (John Hohl kick), 12:07 Nebraska 7–0 Drive: 6 plays, 55 yards, 2:44.
- WIS – Bryson Green 4-yard pass from Braedyn Locke (Nathanial Vakos kick), 8:52 Tie 7–7 Drive: 6 plays, 82 yards, 3:11.

Second quarter

- NEB – Dante Dowdell 12-yard run (John Hohl kick), 14:18 Nebraska 14–7 Drive: 8 plays, 80 yards, 3:45.
- WIS – Nathanial Vakos 33-yard field goal, 9:58. Nebraska 14–10. Drive: 7 plays, 32 yards, 4:12.
- NEB – Jahmal Banks 5-yard pass from Dylan Raiola (John Hohl kick), 0:17 Nebraska 21–10 Drive: 10 plays, 76 yards, 3:00.
- NEB – John Hohl 37-yard field goal, 0:02. Nebraska 24–10. Drive: 2 plays, 12 yards, 4:12.

Third quarter

- NEB – John Hohl 45-yard field goal, 11:18. Nebraska 27–10. Drive: 9 plays, 46 yards, 2:44.
- NEB – Dante Dowdell 3-yard run (John Hohl kick), 3:07 Nebraska 34–10 Drive: 7 plays, 74 yards, 3:18.
- WIS – Bryson Green 24-yard pass from Braedyn Locke (Nathanial Vakos kick), 1:19 Nebraska 34–17 Drive: 4 plays, 79 yards, 1:44.

Fourth quarter

- NEB – John Hohl 26-yard field goal, 10:52. Nebraska 37–17. Drive: 11 plays, 67 yards, 5:27.
- WIS – Vinny Anthony II 58-yard pass from Braedyn Locke (Braedyn Locke pass to Bryson Green), 8:30 Nebraska 37–25 Drive: 5 plays, 75 yards, 2:22.
- NEB – Dante Dowdell 1-yard run (John Hohl kick), 3:11 Nebraska 44–25 Drive: 10 plays, 75 yards, 5:19.

Top passers

- WIS – Braedyn Locke – 20/30, 292 yards, 3 TD, INT
- NEB – Dylan Raiola – 28/38, 293 yards, TD

Top rushers

- WIS – Darrion Dupree – 8 rushes, 63 yards
- NEB – Dante Dowdell – 10 carries, 41 yards, 3 TD

Top receivers

- WIS – Vinny Anthony II – 7 receptions, 137 yards, TD
- NEB – Jacory Barney Jr. – 9 receptions, 85 yards

Top defenders

- WIS – Christian Alliegro – 11 tackles
- NEB – DeShon Singleton – 6 tackles, INT

=== Minnesota ===
Minnesota (6–5) vs. Wisconsin (5–6) – Game summary

| Quarter | 1 | 2 | 3 | 4 | Total |
|---|---|---|---|---|---|
| Golden Gophers | 7 | 7 | 7 | 3 | 24 |
| Badgers | 0 | 0 | 7 | 0 | 7 |

at Camp Randall Stadium, Madison, Wisconsin

- Date: November 30, 2024
- Game time: 11:00 a.m.
- Game weather: Cloudy, 22 °F (−6 °C); Wind: W 17 mph
- Game attendance: 76,059
- Referee: Bryan Banks
- TV announcers (CBS): Tom McCarthy (play-by-play), Jay Feely (analyst), and Tiffany Blackmon (sideline)

Game information

First quarter

- MIN – Max Brosmer 1-yard run (Dragan Kesich kick), 3:18 Minnesota 7–0 Drive: 9 plays, 89 yards, 4:24.

Second quarter

- MIN – Daniel Jackson 7-yard pass from Max Brosmer (Dragan Kesich kick), 11:37 Minnesota 14–0 Drive: 7 plays, 75 yards, 3:16.

Third quarter

- MIN – Jameson Geers 15-yard pass from Max Brosmer (Dragan Kesich kick), 8:03 Minnesota 21–0 Drive: 11 plays, 83 yards, 6:02.
- WIS – Vinny Anthony II 15-yard pass from Braedyn Locke (Nathanial Vakos kick), 3:13 Minnesota 21–7 Drive: 11 plays, 65 yards, 4:50.

Fourth quarter

- MIN – Dragan Kesich 43-yard field goal, 3:19. Minnesota 24–7. Drive: 9 plays, 35 yards, 4:46.

Top passers

- WIS – Braedyn Locke – 15/32, 130 yards, TD
- MIN – Max Brosmer – 17/26, 191 yards, 2 TD

Top rushers

- WIS – Tawee Walker – 14 rushes, 36 yards
- MIN – Darius Taylor – 32 carries, 143 yards

Top receivers

- WIS – Trech Kekahuna – 6 receptions, 64 yards
- MIN – Daniel Jackson – 6 receptions, 61 yards, TD

Top defenders

- WIS – Hunter Wohler – 8 tackles
- MIN – Koi Perich – 8 tackles, pass breakup

== 2025 NFL draft ==
| Round | Pick | Player | Position | NFL club |
|---|---|---|---|---|
| 7 | 218 | Jack Nelson | OT | Atlanta Falcons |
| 7 | 232 | Hunter Wohler | S | Indianapolis Colts |
