= Jonathan Nelson =

Jonathan Nelson may refer to:

- Jonathan Nelson (American football) (born 1988), American football safety
- Jonathan Nelson (singer) (born 1974), American gospel singer-songwriter
- Jonathan Nelson, American founder of Organic, Inc.
- Jonathan M. Nelson (born 1956), founder of Providence Equity Partners

== See also ==
- Jon Nelson (disambiguation)
- John Nelson (disambiguation)
- Nelson (surname)
