= Jon Nelson =

Jon Nelson may refer to:

- Jon Nelson (artist), sound collage artist and radio show host
- Jon Nelson (politician) (born 1953), member of the North Dakota House of Representatives

== See also ==
- Jonathan Nelson (disambiguation)
- John Nelson (disambiguation)
