= John Nelson (English cricketer) =

English cricketer

John Nelson (28 October 1891 – 12 August 1917) was an English cricketer active in 1913 who played for Lancashire. He was born in Blackpool and died in the Battle of Pilckem Ridge while serving with the British Army in World War I. He appeared in one first-class match and scored seven runs with a highest score of 5.
