= Braedyn Locke =

American football player (born 2003)

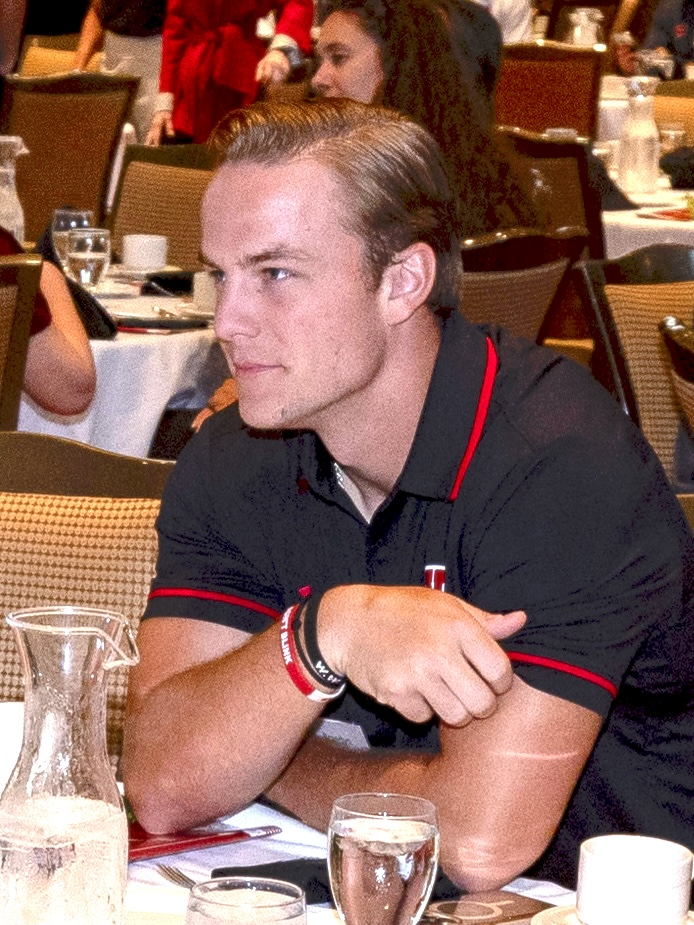
- Locke in 2024

No. 8 – Tarleton State Texans
- Position: Quarterback
- Class: Redshirt Junior

Personal information
- Born: December 8, 2003 (age 22)
- Listed height: 6 ft 0 in (1.83 m)
- Listed weight: 200 lb (91 kg)

Career information
- High school: Rockwall (Rockwall, Texas)
- College: Mississippi State (2022); Wisconsin (2023–2024); Arizona (2025); Tarleton State (2026–present)
- Stats at ESPN

Braedyn Duncan Locke (born December 8, 2003) is an American college football quarterback for the Tarleton State Texans. He previously played for the Mississippi State Bulldogs, Wisconsin Badgers and Arizona Wildcats.

== Early life ==
Locke attended Rockwall High School in Rockwall, Texas, where he passed for 11,182 yards and a Class 6A Texas state record 127 touchdowns. Locke committed to play college football at the Mississippi State University.

== College career ==
=== Mississippi State ===
Locke was redshirted in 2022, after which he entered his name in the NCAA transfer portal.

=== Wisconsin ===
Locke transferred to the University of Wisconsin. In week 7 of the 2023 season, he replaced injured starter Tanner Mordecai and completed 15 of 30 passes for 122 yards with one interception in a 15–6 loss to Iowa. In his first career start, he completed 21 of 41 pass attempts for 240 yards and two touchdowns in an 18-point comeback win over Illinois, earning Big Ten Conference freshman of the week honors.

In week 3 of the 2024 season, he replaced injured starter Tyler Van Dyke and completed 13 of 26 passes for 125 yards and one touchdown against Alabama.

On December 11, 2024, Locke announced that he would enter the transfer portal for the second time.

=== Arizona ===
On December 27, 2024, Locke announced his transfer to play for the Arizona Wildcats.

=== Statistics ===
Season	Team	Games			Passing								Rushing			
Season	Team	GP	GS	Record	Cmp	Att	Pct	Yds	Y/A	TD	Int	Rtg	Att	Yds	Avg	TD
2022	Mississippi State	0	0	—	Redshirted (redshirt)											
2023	Wisconsin	5	3	1–2	76	152	50.0	777	5.1	5	1	102.5	17	−2	−0.1	0
2024	Wisconsin	11	9	3–6	164	296	55.4	1,936	6.5	13	10	118.1	22	4	0.2	2
2025	Arizona	4	0	—	5	15	33.3	68	4.5	0	1	58.1	5	−23	−4.6	0
2026	Tarleton State	0	0	—												
FBS career		20	12	4–8	245	463	52.9	2,781	6.0	18	12	111.0	44	–21	–0.5	2
FCS career

== Personal life ==
Locke's brother, Landyn Locke is a quarterback for the Sam Houston Bearkats.
