= Tawee Walker =

American football player (born 2001)

No. 3 – Cincinnati Bearcats
- Position: Running back
- Class: Redshirt Senior

Personal information
- Born: January 3, 2001 (age 25); North Las Vegas, Nevada
- Listed height: 5 ft 8 in (1.73 m)
- Listed weight: 218 lb (99 kg)

Career information
- High school: Centennial (Peoria, Arizona)
- College: Palomar (2021); Oklahoma (2022–2023); Wisconsin (2024); Cincinnati (2025)
- Stats at ESPN

Tawee Walker (born January 3, 2001) is an American college football running back for the Cincinnati Bearcats. He previously played for the Oklahoma Sooners and the Wisconsin Badgers.

== Early life ==
Walker grew up in North Las Vegas, Nevada, and attended Mojave High School before transferring to Centennial High School in Peoria, Arizona during his senior season.

== College career ==
=== Palomar ===
In his lone season at Palomar College in 2021, Walker played all 11 games and had 187 carries for 875 yards and eight touchdowns.

=== Oklahoma ===
After the 2021 season, Walker decided to walk-on to play for the Oklahoma Sooners. In his first season with the Sooners in 2022 he had 18 carries for 62 yards while playing in 11 games for the Sooners. In week 2 of the 2023 season, Walker rushed 21 times for 117 yards in a win over SMU. In week 6, he rushed for 46 yards and two touchdowns as the Sooners main running back, helping them beat #3 Texas. In week 8, Walker rushed for a career-high 146 yards and a touchdown in a loss to Kansas. During the 2023 season, he had 102 carries for 513 yards and seven touchdowns, while also hauling in ten receptions for 81 yards. After the season Walker entered his name into the NCAA transfer portal.

=== Wisconsin ===
Walker transferred to play for the Wisconsin Badgers.

On December 23, 2024, Walker announced that he would enter the transfer portal.

=== Cincinnati ===
On January 7, 2025, Walker announced that he would transfer to Cincinnati.

== Statistics ==
Year	Team	Games		Rushing				Receiving			
Year	Team	GP	GS	Att	Yards	Avg	TD	Rec	Yards	Avg	TD
2021	Palomar CC	11	11	187	875	4.7	8	19	189	9.9	0
2022	Oklahoma	11	0	18	62	3.4	0	1	7	7.0	0
2023	Oklahoma	12	1	102	513	5.0	7	10	81	8.1	0
2024	Wisconsin	11	9	190	864	4.5	10	11	21	1.9	0
2025	Cincinnati	12	12	120	709	5.9	4	18	78	4.2	1
NCAA Career		46	22	430	2,148	4.7	21	40	187	4.7	1

== Professional career ==
Pre-draft measurables
Height	Weight	Arm length	Hand span	Wingspan	40-yard dash	10-yard split	20-yard split	Vertical jump	Broad jump	Bench press
5 ft 8 1/2 in (1.74 m)	218 lb (99 kg)	29 3/8 in (0.75 m)	9 1/2 in (0.24 m)	5 ft 10 5/8 in (1.79 m)	4.76 s	1.63 s	2.69 s	33.5 in (0.85 m)	9 ft 4 in (2.84 m)	24 reps
All values from Pro Day
