= John Nelson (footballer) =

Australian rules footballer

Personal information
- Full name: John Nelson
- Born: 1 February 1934 (age 92)
- Original team: Norwood
- Height: 180 cm (5 ft 11 in)
- Weight: 73 kg (161 lb)

Playing career^{1}
Years	Club	Games (Goals)
1955	St Kilda	11 (0)
- ^{1} Playing statistics correct to the end of 1955.

John Nelson (born 1 February 1934) is a former Australian rules footballer who played with St Kilda in the Victorian Football League (VFL).
