= Jack Nelson (offensive tackle) =

American football player (born 2002)

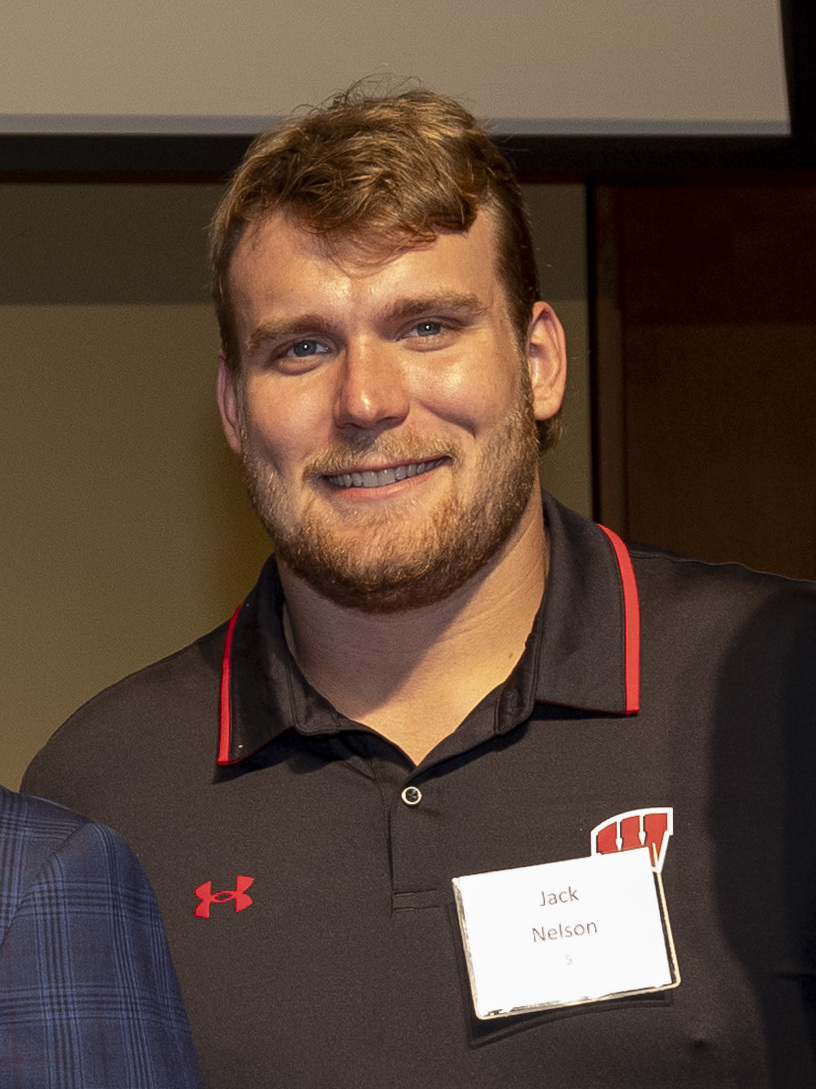
- Nelson in 2024

No. 79 – Minnesota Vikings
- Position: Offensive tackle
- Roster status: Practice squad

Personal information
- Born: January 15, 2002 (age 24); Stoughton, Wisconsin, U.S.
- Listed height: 6 ft 7 in (2.01 m)
- Listed weight: 314 lb (142 kg)

Career information
- High school: Stoughton (WI)
- College: Wisconsin (2020–2024)
- NFL draft: 2025: 7th round, 218th overall pick

Career history
- Atlanta Falcons (2025); Minnesota Vikings (2026–present)*
- * Offseason or practice squad member only

Career NFL statistics as of 2025
- Games played: 10
- Stats at Pro Football Reference

Jack Nelson (born January 15, 2002) is an American professional football offensive tackle for the Minnesota Vikings of the National Football League (NFL). He played college football for the Wisconsin Badgers and was selected by the Atlanta Falcons in the seventh round of the 2025 NFL draft.

== Early life ==
Nelson attended Stoughton High School in Stoughton, Wisconsin. He was rated as a five-star recruit and committed to play college football for the Wisconsin Badgers.

== College career ==
Nelson after a 2024 game

Nelson was redshirted as a freshman in 2020 and appeared in one game against Michigan. In 2021, he started all 13 games for the Badgers at right guard and earned honorable mention all-Big Ten Conference honors. During the 2022 season, Nelson started all 12 games at left tackle for Wisconsin. In the 2023 season, he started all 13 games for the Badgers at left tackle.

== Professional career ==
Pre-draft measurables
Height	Weight	Arm length	Hand span	Wingspan	Bench press
6 ft 7 in (2.01 m)	314 lb (142 kg)	33 1/2 in (0.85 m)	10 in (0.25 m)	6 ft 9 3/8 in (2.07 m)	23 reps
All values from NFL Combine/Pro Day

=== Atlanta Falcons ===
Nelson was selected by the Atlanta Falcons in the seventh round, 218th overall, of the 2025 NFL draft.

On August 14, 2026, Nelson was waived by the Falcons with an injury settlement.

=== Minnesota Vikings ===
On August 31, 2026, Nelson was signed to the Minnesota Vikings' practice squad.

== Personal life ==
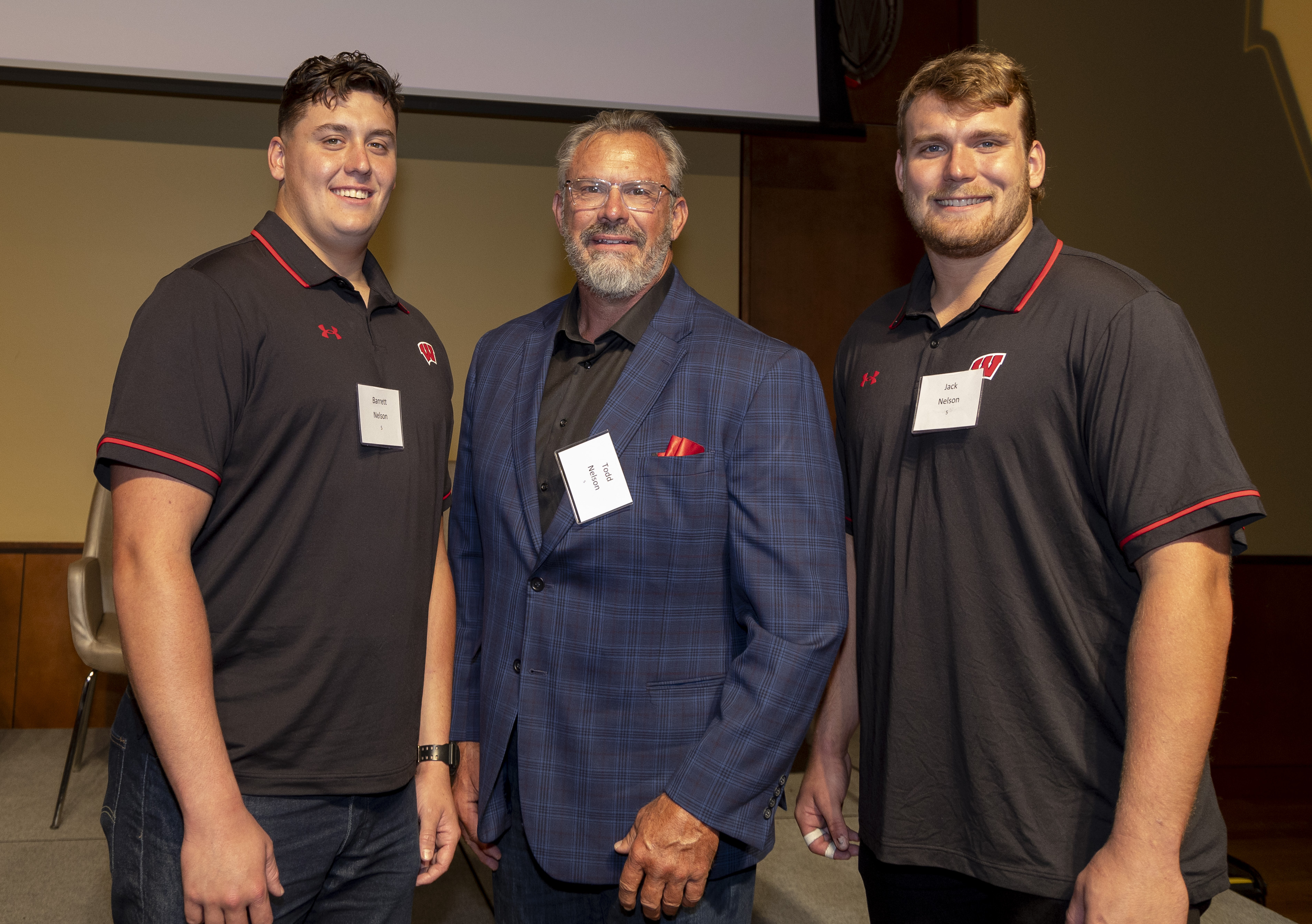
Nelson (right) in 2024, photographed with his brother Barrett and father Todd

Nelson's father Todd played as an offensive tackle for the Wisconsin Badgers, and his younger brother Barrett is also an offensive tackle for Wisconsin.
