= 2025 Wisconsin Badgers football team =

American college football season

2025 Wisconsin Badgers football
- Conference: Big Ten Conference
- Record: 4–8 (2–7 Big Ten)
- Head coach: Luke Fickell (3rd season)
- Offensive coordinator: Jeff Grimes (1st season)
- Offensive scheme: Multiple
- Defensive coordinator: Mike Tressel (3rd season)
- Base defense: 4–2–5
- Home stadium: Camp Randall Stadium

Uniform
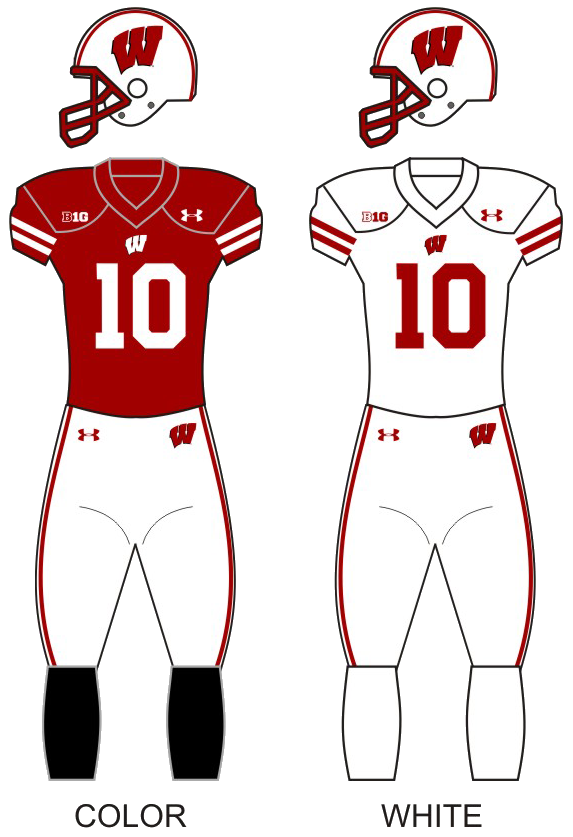

2025 Big Ten Conference football standings
	Conf.			Overall
Team	W		L	W		L
No. 1 Indiana y$#^	9	–	0	16	–	0
No. 5 Ohio State y^	9	–	0	12	–	2
No. 4 Oregon ^	8	–	1	13	–	2
No. 21 Michigan	7	–	2	9	–	4
No. 20 USC	7	–	2	9	–	4
No. 17 Iowa	6	–	3	9	–	4
Illinois	5	–	4	9	–	4
Washington	5	–	4	9	–	4
Minnesota	5	–	4	8	–	5
Nebraska	4	–	5	7	–	6
Northwestern	4	–	5	7	–	6
Penn State	3	–	6	7	–	6
UCLA	3	–	6	3	–	9
Rutgers	2	–	7	5	–	7
Wisconsin	2	–	7	4	–	8
Maryland	1	–	8	4	–	8
Michigan State	1	–	8	4	–	8
Purdue	0	–	9	2	–	10
Championship: Indiana 13, Ohio State 10
# – College Football Playoff champion; ^ – College Football Playoff participant; $ – Conference champion; y – Championship game participant; As of November 12, 2026; Rankings from AP Poll

The 2025 Wisconsin Badgers football team represented the University of Wisconsin–Madison as a member of the Big Ten Conference during the 2025 NCAA Division I FBS football season. The Badgers were led by third-year head coach Luke Fickell and played their home games at Camp Randall Stadium located in Madison, Wisconsin.

== Offseason ==
=== 2025 NFL draft ===
Round	Pick	Player	Position	NFL club
7	218	Jack Nelson	OT	Atlanta Falcons
7	232	Hunter Wohler	S	Indianapolis Colts
Undrafted		Joe Huber	OT	Minnesota Vikings
Undrafted		RJ Delancey III	CB	New York Giants
Undrafted		Bryson Green	WR	Arizona Cardinals

=== Recruiting class ===
College recruiting (2025)
Name	Hometown	School	Height	Weight	Commit date
Carter Smith; QB	Fort Myers, Florida	Bishop Verot High School	6 ft 3 in (1.91 m)	185 lb (84 kg)	Nov 24, 2024
Carter Smith; QB	Recruit ratings: Rivals: 247Sports: ESPN: (82)				
Mason Posa; ILB	Albuquerque, New Mexico	La Cueva High School	6 ft 3 in (1.91 m)	215 lb (98 kg)	Jun 13, 2024
Mason Posa; ILB	Recruit ratings: Rivals: 247Sports: ESPN: (81)				
Nicolas Clayton; DE	Gainesville, Florida	Buchholz High School	6 ft 5 in (1.96 m)	210 lb (95 kg)	Jun 22, 2024
Nicolas Clayton; DE	Recruit ratings: Rivals: 247Sports: ESPN: (80)				
Jaylen Williams; DT	Palatine, Illinois	Palatine High School	6 ft 6 in (1.98 m)	280 lb (130 kg)	Nov 20, 2024
Jaylen Williams; DT	Recruit ratings: Rivals: 247Sports: ESPN: (80)				
Logan Powell; OT	Phoenix, Arizona	Brophy College Preparatory	6 ft 5 in (1.96 m)	255 lb (116 kg)	Jun 1, 2024
Logan Powell; OT	Recruit ratings: Rivals: 247Sports: ESPN: (79)				
Hardy Watts; OT	Brookline, Massachusetts	Dexter Southfield School	6 ft 5 in (1.96 m)	285 lb (129 kg)	Jul 1, 2024
Hardy Watts; OT	Recruit ratings: Rivals: 247Sports: ESPN: (79)				
Eugene Hilton; WR	Zionsville, Indiana	Zionsville Community High School	6 ft 1 in (1.85 m)	185 lb (84 kg)	Jun 14, 2024
Eugene Hilton; WR	Recruit ratings: Rivals: 247Sports: ESPN: (79)				
Michael Roeske; OT	Wautoma, Wisconsin	Wautoma High School	6 ft 7 in (2.01 m)	265 lb (120 kg)	Nov 12, 2023
Michael Roeske; OT	Recruit ratings: Rivals: 247Sports: ESPN: (79)				
Jai'mier Scott; CB	Cincinnati, Ohio	Mount Healthy High School	6 ft 0 in (1.83 m)	180 lb (82 kg)	Jan 20, 2024
Jai'mier Scott; CB	Recruit ratings: Rivals: 247Sports: ESPN: (79)				
Torin Pettaway; DE	Middleton, Wisconsin	Middleton High School	6 ft 6 in (1.98 m)	260 lb (120 kg)	Jun 11, 2024
Torin Pettaway; DE	Recruit ratings: Rivals: 247Sports: ESPN: (78)				
Nolan Davenport; OT	Massillon, Ohio	Washington Court House High School	6 ft 6 in (1.98 m)	260 lb (120 kg)	Jun 6, 2024
Nolan Davenport; OT	Recruit ratings: Rivals: 247Sports: ESPN: (78)				
Nizyi Davis; TE	Indianapolis, Indiana	Lawrence Central High School	6 ft 4 in (1.93 m)	215 lb (98 kg)	Jun 10, 2024
Nizyi Davis; TE	Recruit ratings: Rivals: 247Sports: ESPN: (77)				
Samuel Lateju; OLB	Lawrenceville, New Jersey	Lawrenceville School	6 ft 5 in (1.96 m)	225 lb (102 kg)	Mar 4, 2024
Samuel Lateju; OLB	Recruit ratings: Rivals: 247Sports: ESPN: (77)				
Luke Emmerich; S	Monticello, Minnesota	Monticello High School	6 ft 1 in (1.85 m)	195 lb (88 kg)	May 3, 2024
Luke Emmerich; S	Recruit ratings: Rivals: 247Sports: ESPN: (77)				
Xavier Ukponu; DT	Denton, Texas	John H. Guyer High School	6 ft 3 in (1.91 m)	280 lb (130 kg)	Aug 5, 2024
Xavier Ukponu; DT	Recruit ratings: Rivals: 247Sports: ESPN: (77)				
Cam Clark; OT	Dexter, Michigan	Dexter High School	6 ft 6 in (1.98 m)	275 lb (125 kg)	Apr 25, 2024
Cam Clark; OT	Recruit ratings: Rivals: 247Sports: ESPN: (77)				
Remington Moss; S	Chesapeake, Virginia	Saint Michael the Archangel High School	6 ft 1 in (1.85 m)	185 lb (84 kg)	Aug 2, 2023
Remington Moss; S	Recruit ratings: Rivals: 247Sports: ESPN: (77)				
Grant Dean; S	Neenah, Wisconsin	Neenah High School	6 ft 0 in (1.83 m)	185 lb (84 kg)	Apr 11, 2024
Grant Dean; S	Recruit ratings: Rivals: 247Sports: ESPN: (76)				
Cooper Catalano; ILB	Germantown, Wisconsin	Germantown High School	6 ft 1 in (1.85 m)	205 lb (93 kg)	Nov 28, 2023
Cooper Catalano; ILB	Recruit ratings: Rivals: 247Sports: ESPN: (76)				
Jahmare Washington; CB	Chicago, Illinois	Morgan Park High School	6 ft 1 in (1.85 m)	170 lb (77 kg)	Jun 23, 2024
Jahmare Washington; CB	Recruit ratings: Rivals: 247Sports: ESPN: (76)				
Cairo Skanes; CB	Charlotte, North Carolina	Providence Day School	5 ft 11 in (1.80 m)	160 lb (73 kg)	Dec 2, 2024
Cairo Skanes; CB	Recruit ratings: Rivals: 247Sports: ESPN: (75)				
Emmett Bork; TE	Oconomowoc, Wisconsin	Oconomowoc High School	6 ft 5 in (1.96 m)	240 lb (110 kg)	Oct 28, 2024
Emmett Bork; TE	Recruit ratings: Rivals: 247Sports: ESPN: (74)				
Overall recruit ranking: Rivals: 27 247Sports: 26 ESPN: —
Note: In many cases, Scout, Rivals, 247Sports, On3, and ESPN may conflict in their listings of height and weight.; In these cases, the average was taken. ESPN grades are on a 100-point scale.; Sources: "2025 Wisconsin Football Commitment List". Rivals.; "2025 Wisconsin Football Commitment List". ESPN.; "2025 Team Ranking". Rivals.com.; "Wisconsin 2025 Football Commits". 247Sports.

==== Recruiting class rankings ====
Website	National rank	Conference rank	5 star recruits	4 star recruits	3 star recruits	Total
247Sports	26	7	0	5	17	22
ESPN	—	—	0	2	20	22
Rivals	27	8	0	10	11	22

=== Transfers ===
Wisconsin outgoing transfers
Name	Number	Pos.	Height	Weight	Year	Hometown	Transfer to
James Thompson Jr.	#90	DL	6'5	288	Senior (redshirt)	Cincinnati, OH	Illinois
Riley Nowakowski	#37	TE	6'1	243	Senior (redshirt)	Milwaukee, WI	Indiana
Tyler Van Dyke	#10	QB	6'4	229	Senior	Glastonbury, CT	SMU
Cole LaCrue	#17	QB	6'2	190	Freshman (redshirt)	Broomfield, CO	Eastern Illinois
Amare Snowden	#16	CB	6'3	190	Freshman (redshirt)	Roseville, MI	Toledo
Jonas Duclona	#21	CB	5'10	188	Sophomore	Naples, FL	South Florida
C.J. Williams	#4	WR	6'1	188	Junior	Santa Ana, CA	Stanford
Kamo'i Latu	#13	S	6'0	207	Senior	Honolulu, HI	UConn
Justin Taylor	#25	S	6'0	200	Freshman (redshirt)	Broadview, IL	Wyoming
Curtis Neal	#92	DL	6'0	300	Sophomore (redshirt)	Cornelius, NC	Illinois
Leon Lowery	#8	LB	6'3	215	Junior (redshirt)	North Brunswick, NJ	Illinois
Jace Arnold	#22	CB	5'9	185	Freshman (redshirt)	Marietta, GA	Sam Houston State
Braedyn Moore	#20	S	6'2	204	Freshman (redshirt)	Hamilton, OH	Toledo
Hank Weber	#60	DL	6'3	263	Freshman	Franklin, TN	Samford
James Durand	#65	OL	6'5	303	Freshman (redshirt)	Chandler, AZ	Western Illinois
Braedyn Locke	#18	QB	6'0	200	Junior	Rockwall, TX	Arizona
Max Lofy	#12	S	5'10	190	Senior (redshirt)	Colorado Springs, CO	Rice
Will Pauling	#6	WR	5'10	187	Junior (redshirt)	Flossmoor, IL	Notre Dame
Nate Van Zelst	#29	K	5'10	175	Junior (redshirt)	Glenview, IL	
Anelu Lafaele	#51	LB	6'2	225	Freshman	Honolulu, HI	Michigan State
Xavier Lucas	#6	S	6'1	170	Freshman	Fort Lauderdale, FL	Miami (FL)
Mabrey Mettauer	#11	QB	6'5	225	Freshman	The Woodlands, TX	Sam Houston State
Tawee Walker	#3	RB	5'9	216	Senior	North Las Vegas, NV	Cincinnati
Nate White	#20	RB	5'11	170	Freshman (redshirt)	Milwaukee, WI	South Dakota State

Wisconsin incoming transfers
Name	Number	Pos.	Height	Weight	Year	Hometown	Previous team
Antarron Turner	#28	LB	6'2	241	Junior (redshirt)	Ocala, FL	Western Carolina
Matthew Traynor	#13	S	6'2	208	Sophomore	Marietta, GA	Richmond
Michael Garner	#51	OLB	6'6	302	Junior	Chicago, IL	Grambling State
Tyreese Fearbry	#7	OLB	6'4	250	Junior (redshirt)	Pittsburgh, PA	Kentucky
Corey Walker	#92	OLB	6'5	290	Senior (redshirt)	Normal, IL	Western Michigan
Parker Petersen	#99	DL	6'4	314	Senior (redshirt)	Nashville, TN	Tulane
Charles Perkins	#30	DL	6'2	323	Junior (redshirt)	Memphis, TN	UT Martin
Jayden Ballard	#4	WR	6'2	205	Senior (redshirt)	Massillon, OH	Ohio State
Danny O'Neil	#18	QB	6'0	197	Sophomore	Indianapolis, IN	San Diego State
Billy Edwards Jr.	#9	QB	6'3	228	Graduate	Springfield, VA	Maryland
Mason Reiger	#22	OLB	6'5	248	Graduate	Hoffman Estates, IL	Louisville
Matthew Jung	#29	S	6'3	219	Junior (redshirt)	Neenah, WI	Bethel
Geimere Latimer	#1	CB	5'10	191	Junior	Fairburn, GA	Jacksonville State
Jay'viar Suggs	#31	DL	6'3	299	Graduate	Flint, MI	LSU
D'Yoni Hill	#5	CB	6'0	180	Senior	Gainesville, FL	Miami (FL)
Stone Anderson	#92	P	6'2	192	Sophomore (redshirt)	Deerfield, MA	Michigan
Dekel Crowdus	#14	WR	5'11	180	Senior (redshirt)	Lexington, KY	Hawaii
Andrew Goodman	#48	LS	5'11	240	Junior (redshirt)	Montreal	Tulane
Davis Heinzen	#74	OL	6'5	311	Senior (redshirt)	Manitowoc, WI	Central Michigan
Nick Levy	#46	LS	5'10	230	Senior	Ashburn, VA	Purdue
Lance Mason	#86	TE	6'4	250	Senior	Rockwall, TX	Missouri State
Hunter Simmons	#15	QB	6'3	229	Senior	Marion, IL	Southern Illinois

== Preseason ==
=== Preseason Big Ten poll ===
Although the Big Ten Conference has not held an official preseason poll since 2010, Cleveland.com has polled sports journalists representing all member schools as a de facto preseason media poll since 2011. For the 2025 poll, Wisconsin was projected to finish twelfth overall in the Big Ten standings.

== Schedule ==
Date	Time	Opponent	Site	TV	Result	Attendance
August 28	8:00 p.m.	Miami (OH)*	Camp Randall Stadium; Madison, WI	BTN	W 17–0	65,952
September 6	3:00 p.m.	Middle Tennessee*	Camp Randall Stadium; Madison, WI	FS1	W 42–10	70,368
September 13	11:00 a.m.	at No. 19 Alabama*	Bryant–Denny Stadium; Tuscaloosa, AL	ABC	L 14–38	100,077
September 20	11:00 a.m.	Maryland	Camp Randall Stadium; Madison, WI	NBC	L 10–27	68,547
October 4	11:00 a.m.	at No. 20 Michigan	Michigan Stadium; Ann Arbor, MI (Big Noon Kickoff)	FOX	L 10–24	111,070
October 11	6:00 p.m.	Iowa^{†}	Camp Randall Stadium; Madison, WI (Heartland Trophy)	FS1	L 0–37	76,064
October 18	2:30 p.m.	No. 1 Ohio State	Camp Randall Stadium; Madison, WI	CBS	L 0–34	72,795
October 25	6:00 p.m.	at No. 6 Oregon	Autzen Stadium; Eugene, OR	FS1	L 7–21	58,940
November 8	3:30 p.m.	No. 23 Washington	Camp Randall Stadium; Madison, WI	BTN	W 13–10	71,217
November 15	11:00 a.m.	at No. 2 Indiana	Memorial Stadium; Bloomington, IN	BTN	L 7–31	55,042
November 22	6:30 p.m.	No. 21 Illinois	Camp Randall Stadium; Madison, WI	BTN	W 27–10	67,876
November 29	2:30 p.m.	at Minnesota	Huntington Bank Stadium; Minneapolis, MN (Paul Bunyan’s Axe)	FS1	L 7–17	46,038
*Non-conference game; ^{†}Homecoming; Rankings from AP Poll (and CFP Rankings, after November 4) - Released prior to game; All times are in Central time; Source:

== Roster ==
2025 Wisconsin Badgers football team roster
Players
Coaches
Offense

Pos.	#	Name	Class
WR	1	Chris Brooks Jr.	Jr
WR	2	Trech Kekahuna	So
WR	3	Tyrell Henry	Jr
WR	4	Jayden Ballard	Sr
QB	5	Carter Smith	Fr
RB	6	Darrion Dupree	So
RB	7	Dilin Jones (injured)	Fr
WR	8	Vinny Anthony II	Sr
QB	9	Billy Edwards Jr. (injured)	GS
RB	10	Gideon Ituka (injured)	Fr
TE	11	Tucker Ashcraft	Jr
WR	12	Joseph Griffin Jr. (injured)	Jr
WR	13	Eugene Hilton Jr.	Fr
QB	15	Hunter Simmons	Sr
QB	16	Milos Spasojevic	Fr
TE	17	Nizyi Davis	Fr
QB	18	Danny O'Neil (injured)	So
WR	19	Langdon Nordgaard	Fr
WR	20	Dekel Crowdus	Sr
WR	22	Kyan Berry-Johnson	Fr
WR	23	Davion Thomas-Kumpula	So
RB	25	Cade Yacamelli	Jr
RB	30	Harrison Bortolotti	Fr
TE	34	Jackson Acker	Sr
RB	38	Mason Lane	Fr
TE	41	JT Seagreaves	Jr
RB	43	Grover Bortolotti	GS
OL	50	Ryan Cory	Fr
OL	52	Hardy Watts	Fr
OL	53	Cam Clark	Fr
OL	55	Kevin Heywood (injured)	So
OL	56	Joe Brunner	Jr
OL	57	Jake Renfro (injured)	GS
OL	58	Michael Roeske	Fr
OL	60	Nolan Davenport	Fr
OL	61	Joey Okla	Jr
OL	64	Evan Brown	So
OL	66	Leyton Nelson (injured)	Jr
OL	67	JP Benzschawel	Sr
OL	70	Barrett Nelson (injured)	Jr
OL	71	Riley Mahlman	Sr
OL	73	Kerry Kodanko	GS
OL	74	Davis Heinzen	Sr
OL	75	Emerson Mandell	Fr
OL	76	John Clifford	Jr
OL	77	Peyton Lange	So
OL	78	Colin Cubberly	Fr
OL	79	Logan Powell	Fr
WR	81	Mason Kelley	Fr
WR	82	Emmett Bork	Fr
TE	85	Grant Stec	Fr
TE	86	Lance Mason	Sr
TE	87	Jackson McGohan	So
WR	89	Ben Lemirand (injured)	Fr

Defense

Pos.	#	Name	Class
LB	0	Christian Alliegro	Jr
CB	1	Geimere Latimer II	Jr
CB	2	Ricardo Hallman	GS
CB	3	Nyzier Fourqurean (I)	GS
LB	4	Tackett Curtis	Jr
CB	5	D'Yoni Hill	Sr
OLB	7	Tyreese Fearbry	Jr
LB	8	Mason Posa	Fr
S	9	Austin Brown	Sr
CB	10	Jahmare Washington	Fr
CB	11	Omillio Agard	Fr
OLB	12	Nicolas Clayton	Fr
S	13	Matthew Traynor (injured)	So
S	14	Preston Zachman (injured)	GS
LB	15	Sebastian Cheeks	Jr
S	16	Grant Dean	Fr
OLB	17	Darryl Peterson III	GS
S	18	Owen Arnett (injured)	GS
LB	19	Thomas Heiberger	Fr
S	20	Luke Emmerich	Fr
CB	21	Cairo Skanes	Fr
OLB	22	Mason Reiger	GS
LB	23	Landon Gauthier	Fr
CB	24	Jai'mier Scott	Fr
S	27	Raphael Dunn	Fr
LB	28	Antarron Turner	Jr
S	29	Matthew Jung	Jr
DL	30	Charles Perkins	Jr
DL	31	Jay'viar Suggs	GS
S	32	Remington Moss	Fr
S	34	Charlie Jarvis	Jr
OLB	35	Angel Toombs	So
LB	42	Tyler Jansey	So
LB	44	Cooper Catalano	Fr
LB	45	Garrison Solliday	GS
OLB	47	Evan Van Dyn Hoven (injured)	So
OLB	50	Sam Lateju	Fr
OLB	51	Micheal Garner	Jr
OLB	55	Drew Braam	Fr
OLB	56	Cody Raymond	Fr
OLB	59	Aaron Witt	GS
DL	68	Ben Barten	GS
DL	76	Dillan Johnson	So
DL	77	Will McDonald	So
DL	85	Nolan Vils	So
DL	91	Jamel Howard Jr.	So
OLB	92	Corey Walker	Sr
DL	93	Ernest Willor Jr.	Fr
DL	94	Xavier Ukponu	Fr
DL	95	Brandon Lane Jr.	Sr
OLB	97	Jaylen Williams	Fr
DL	98	Torin Pettaway (injured)	Fr
DL	99	Parker Petersen	Sr

Special teams

Pos.	#	Name	Class
LS	46	Nick Levy	Sr
LS	48	Andrew Goodman	Jr
P	49	Atticus Bertrams	Jr
LS	54	Deed Capper	Fr
K	90	Nathanial Vakos	Sr
K	91	Sean West	Fr
P	92	Stone Anderson	So
K	97	Gavin Lahm	Sr

Head coach

- Luke Fickell

Coordinators/assistant coaches

- Jeff Grimes – Offensive coordinator
- Mike Tressel – Defensive coordinator/inside linebackers
- Matt Mitchell – Special teams coordinator/outside linebackers
- A. J. Blazek – Offensive linemen
- Jack Cooper – Safeties
- Kenny Guiton – Quarterbacks
- Paul Haynes – Cornerbacks
- Nate Letton – Tight ends
- Jordan Reid – Wide receivers
- Devon Spalding – Running backs
- E. J. Whitlow – Defensive linemen
- Tuf Borland – Assistant linebackers
- Michael Cibene – Assistant special teams coordinator
- Scott Power – Assistant defensive backs
- Casey Rabach – Assistant offensive linemen
- Blake Rolan – Assistant wide receivers
- Cooper Eckhardt – Graduate assistant
- Zack Heeman – Graduate assistant
- Tyler Gibson – Graduate assistant
- Landon Fickell – Graduate assistant

Legend

- (C) Team captain
- (S) Suspended
- (I) Ineligible
- Injured
- Redshirt

Roster
Last update: August 26, 2025

== Game summaries ==
=== vs Miami (OH) ===
Miami RedHawks (0–0) at Wisconsin Badgers (0–0) – Game summary

Quarter	1	2	3	4	Total
RedHawks	0	0	0	0	0
Badgers	3	0	7	7	17

at Camp Randall Stadium • Madison, Wisconsin

- Date: August 28
- Game time: 8:00 p.m.
- Game weather: Clear, 67 °F (19 °C); Wind: E 6 mph
- Game attendance: 65,952
- Referee: Bryan Banks
- TV announcers (BTN): Lisa Byington (play-by-play), Anthony Herron (analyst), and Melanie Ricks (sideline reporter)
- Box Score

Game information

First quarter

- WIS – Nathanial Vakos 42-yard field goal, 1:39. Wisconsin 3–0. Drive: 15 plays, 69 yards, 7:16.

Second quarter

- No scoring plays.

Third quarter

- WIS – Vinny Anthony II 3-yard pass from Danny O'Neil (Nathanial Vakos kick), 4:08 Wisconsin 10–0 Drive: 7 plays, 54 yards, 2:46.

Fourth quarter

- WIS – Danny O'Neil 1-yard run (Nathanial Vakos kick), 6:45 Wisconsin 17–0 Drive: 3 plays, 2 yards, 1:22.

Statistics	M-OH	WIS
First downs	7	23
Plays–yards	40–117	75–353
Rushes–yards	22–34	43–165
Passing yards	83	188
Passing: comp–att–int	9–18–2	18–32–1
Turnovers	2	1
Time of possession	20:47	39:13

Team	Category	Player	Statistics
Miami (OH)	Passing	Dequan Finn	9/18, 83 yards, 2 INT
Miami (OH)	Rushing	Kenny Tracy	6 carries, 15 yards
Miami (OH)	Receiving	Cole Weaver	3 receptions, 35 yards
Miami (OH)	Defense	Silas Walters	8 tackles, INT, 2 pass breakups
Wisconsin	Passing	Danny O'Neil	12/19, 120 yards, TD, INT
Wisconsin	Rushing	Dilin Jones	14 carries, 74 yards
Wisconsin	Receiving	Vinny Anthony II	4 receptions, 57 yards, TD
Wisconsin	Defense	Preston Zachman	2 tackles, 2 INT

=== vs Middle Tennessee ===
Middle Tennessee Blue Raiders (0–1) at Wisconsin Badgers (1–0) – Game summary

Quarter	1	2	3	4	Total
Blue Raiders	3	7	0	0	10
Badgers	0	14	14	14	42

at Camp Randall Stadium • Madison, Wisconsin

- Date: September 6
- Game time: 3:00 p.m.
- Game weather: Cloudy, 63 °F (17 °C); Wind: NW 12 mph
- Game attendance: 70,368
- Referee: Jeff Servinski
- TV announcers (FS1): Eric Collins (play-by-play) and Spencer Tillman (analyst)
- Box Score

Game information

First quarter

- MTS – Jacob Hathaway 27-yard field goal, 4:13. Middle Tennessee 3–0. Drive: 12 plays, 68 yards, 5:39.

Second quarter

- WIS – Tyrell Henry 3-yard pass from Danny O'Neil (Nathanial Vakos kick), 8:16 Wisconsin 7–3 Drive: 11 plays, 80 yards, 5:44.
- WIS – Dilin Jones 1-yard run (Nathanial Vakos kick), 2:07 Wisconsin 14–3 Drive: 9 plays, 38 yards, 4:57.
- MTS – Hunter Tipton 4-yard pass from Nicholas Vattiato (Jacob Hathaway kick), 1:05 Wisconsin 14–10 Drive: 2 plays, 11 yards, 0:10.

Third quarter

- WIS – Trech Kekahuna 61-yard run (Nathanial Vakos kick), 7:26 Wisconsin 21–10 Drive: 2 plays, 75 yards, 0:52.
- WIS – Vinny Anthony II 14-yard run (Nathanial Vakos kick), 2:44 Wisconsin 28–10 Drive: 5 plays, 50 yards, 2:34.

Fourth quarter

- WIS – Jayden Ballard 58-yard pass from Danny O'Neil (Nathanial Vakos kick), 10:24 Wisconsin 35–10 Drive: 7 plays, 99 yards, 3:41.
- WIS – Lance Mason 17-yard pass from Danny O'Neil (Nathanial Vakos kick), 5:48 Wisconsin 42–10 Drive: 7 plays, 53 yards, 3:33.

Statistics	MTSU	WIS
First downs	14	21
Plays–yards	60–241	58–436
Rushes–yards	28–33	31–153
Passing yards	208	283
Passing: comp–att–int	21–32–1	23–27–1
Turnovers	1	2
Time of possession	29:17	30:43

Team	Category	Player	Statistics
Middle Tennessee	Passing	Nicholas Vattiato	20/31, 197 yards, TD, INT
Middle Tennessee	Rushing	Jekail Middlebrook	12 carries, 27 yards
Middle Tennessee	Receiving	Nahzae Cox	3 receptions, 75 yards
Middle Tennessee	Defense	Muaaz Byard	9 tackles, 1.5 TFL
Wisconsin	Passing	Danny O'Neil	23/27, 283 yards, 3 TD, INT
Wisconsin	Rushing	Dilin Jones	10 carries, 36 yards, TD
Wisconsin	Receiving	Lance Mason	7 receptions, 102 yards, TD
Wisconsin	Defense	Tackett Curtis	7 tackles, sack, pass breakup

=== at No. 19 Alabama ===
Wisconsin Badgers (2–0) at No. 19 Alabama Crimson Tide (1–1) – Game summary

Quarter	1	2	3	4	Total
Badgers	0	0	7	7	14
No. 19 Crimson Tide	7	14	14	3	38

at Bryant–Denny Stadium • Tuscaloosa, Alabama

- Date: September 13
- Game time: 11:00 a.m.
- Game weather: Sunny, 83 °F (28 °C); Wind: NW 5 mph
- Game attendance: 100,077
- Referee: Tim Barker
- TV announcers (ABC): Joe Tessitore (play-by-play), Jesse Palmer (analyst), and Katie George (sideline)
- Box Score

Game information

First quarter

- ALA – Germie Bernard 2-yard run (Conor Talty kick), 2:24. Alabama 7–0 Drive: 11 plays, 61 yards, 6:29.

Second quarter

- ALA – Germie Bernard 43-yard pass from Ty Simpson (Conor Talty kick), 12:05. Alabama 14–0 Drive: 4 plays, 65 yards, 1:46.
- ALA – Isaiah Horton 13-yard pass from Ty Simpson (Conor Talty kick), 0:45. Alabama 21–0 Drive: 8 plays, 98 yards, 4:58.

Third quarter

- ALA – Ryan Coleman-Williams 75-yard pass from Ty Simpson (Conor Talty kick), 14:45. Alabama 28–0 Drive: 1 play, 75 yards, 0:15.
- WIS – Vinny Anthony II 95-yard kickoff return (Nathanial Vakos kick), 14:32. Alabama 28–7
- ALA – Ryan Coleman-Williams 41-yard pass from Ty Simpson (Conor Talty kick), 11:02. Alabama 35–7 Drive: 7 plays, 87 yards, 3:30.

Fourth quarter

- ALA – Conor Talty 33-yard field goal, 13:56. Alabama 38–7. Drive: 12 plays, 73 yards, 6:00.
- WIS – Jayden Ballard 41-yard pass from Danny O'Neil (Nathanial Vakos kick), 5:29. Alabama 38–14 Drive: 7 plays, 70 yards, 3:58.

Statistics	WIS	ALA
First downs	14	22
Plays–yards	51–209	52–454
Rushes–yards	34–92	22–72
Passing yards	117	382
Passing: comp–att–int	11–17–2	24–30–0
Turnovers	2	0
Time of possession	31:17	28:43

Team	Category	Player	Statistics
Wisconsin	Passing	Danny O'Neil	11/17, 117 yards, TD, 2 INT
Wisconsin	Rushing	Darrion Dupree	7 carries, 26 yards
Wisconsin	Receiving	Jayden Ballard	1 reception, 41 yards, TD
Wisconsin	Defense	Austin Brown	11 tackles, TFL
Alabama	Passing	Ty Simpson	24/29, 382 yards, 4 TD
Alabama	Rushing	Ty Simpson	6 carries, 25 yards
Alabama	Receiving	Ryan Coleman-Williams	5 receptions, 165 yards, 2 TD
Alabama	Defense	Bray Hubbard	5 tackles, 2 INT

=== vs Maryland ===
Maryland Terrapins (3–0) at Wisconsin Badgers (2–1) – Game summary

Quarter	1	2	3	4	Total
Terrapins	7	13	0	7	27
Badgers	0	0	3	7	10

at Camp Randall Stadium • Madison, Wisconsin

- Date: September 20
- Game time: 11:00 a.m.
- Game weather: Sunny, 70 °F (21 °C); Wind: S 6 mph
- Game attendance: 68,547
- Referee: Francisco Villar
- TV announcers (NBC): Paul Burmeister (play-by-play), Yogi Roth (analyst), and Caroline Pineda (sideline reporter)
- Box Score

Game information

First quarter

- MD – Malik Washington 1-yard run (Sean O'Haire kick), 6:22 Maryland 7–0 Drive: 2 plays, 4 yards, 0:33.

Second quarter

- MD – Shaleak Knotts 9-yard pass from Malik Washington (Sean O'Haire kick), 13:41 Maryland 14–0 Drive: 5 plays, 28 yards, 1:24.
- MD – Sean O'Haire 49-yard field goal, 3:38. Maryland 17–0. Drive: 8 plays, 39 yards, 2:46.
- MD – Sean O'Haire 26-yard field goal, 0:00. Maryland 20–0. Drive: 5 plays, 57 yards, 0:25.

Third quarter

- WIS – Nathanial Vakos 33-yard field goal, 10:12. Maryland 20–3. Drive: 8 plays, 31 yards, 3:23.

Fourth quarter

- MD – Shaleak Knotts 62-yard pass from Malik Washington (Sean O'Haire kick), 9:03 Maryland 27–3 Drive: 6 plays, 99 yards, 3:22.
- WIS – Lance Mason 13-yard pass from Hunter Simmons (Nathanial Vakos kick), 0:28 Maryland 27–10 Drive: 10 plays, 80 yards, 2:44.

Statistics	MD	WIS
First downs	13	21
Plays–yards	57–326	77–296
Rushes–yards	23–61	42–61
Passing yards	265	235
Passing: comp–att–int	18–34–0	22–35–1
Turnovers	0	1
Time of possession	22:53	37:07

Team	Category	Player	Statistics
Maryland	Passing	Malik Washington	18/34, 265 yards, 2 TD
Maryland	Rushing	DeJuan Williams	15 carries, 62 yards
Maryland	Receiving	Shaleak Knotts	3 receptions, 80 yards, 2 TD
Maryland	Defense	Daniel Wingate	11 tackles, sack, 1.5 TFL, QB hurry
Wisconsin	Passing	Hunter Simmons	7/9, 70 yards, TD
Wisconsin	Rushing	Darrion Dupree	14 carries, 52 yards
Wisconsin	Receiving	Trech Kekahuna	5 receptions, 77 yards
Wisconsin	Defense	Christian Alliegro	7 tackles

=== at No. 20 Michigan ===
Wisconsin Badgers (2–2) at No. 20 Michigan Wolverines (3–1) – Game summary

Quarter	1	2	3	4	Total
Badgers	7	0	0	3	10
No. 20 Wolverines	7	3	7	7	24

at Michigan Stadium • Ann Arbor, Michigan

- Date: October 4
- Game time: 11:00 a.m.
- Game weather: Sunny, 84 °F (29 °C); Wind: SW 7 mph
- Game attendance: 111,070
- Referee: Ron Snodgrass
- TV announcers (FOX): Gus Johnson (play-by-play), Joel Klatt (analyst), and Jenny Taft (sideline)
- Box Score

Game information

First quarter

- WIS – Dilin Jones 5-yard run (Nathanial Vakos kick), 8:10 Wisconsin 7–0 Drive: 12 plays, 75 yards, 6:50.
- OUM – Justice Haynes 1-yard run (Dominic Zvada kick), 6:02 Tie 7–7 Drive: 5 plays, 75 yards, 2:08.

Second quarter

- UOM – Dominic Zvada 40-yard field goal, 3:27. Michigan 10–7. Drive: 8 plays, 44 yards, 3:27.

Third quarter

- UOM – Donaven McCulley 29-yard pass from Bryce Underwood (Dominic Zvada kick), 4:11 Michigan 17–7 Drive: 3 plays, 67 yards, 1:03.

Fourth quarter

- OUM – Justice Haynes 1-yard run (Dominic Zvada kick), 9:24 Michigan 24–7 Drive: 6 plays, 61 yards, 2:47.
- WIS – Nathanial Vakos 39-yard field goal, 2:43. Michigan 24–10. Drive: 13 plays, 53 yards, 6:41.

Statistics	WIS	MICH
First downs	13	19
Plays–yards	57–252	62–445
Rushes–yards	28–75	34–175
Passing yards	177	270
Passing: comp–att–int	18–29–1	19–28–0
Turnovers	1	0
Time of possession	30:57	29:03

Team	Category	Player	Statistics
Wisconsin	Passing	Hunter Simmons	18/29, 177 yards, INT
Wisconsin	Rushing	Dilin Jones	17 carries, 63 yards, TD
Wisconsin	Receiving	Vinny Anthony II	9 receptions, 97 yards
Wisconsin	Defense	Matt Jung	9 tackles
Michigan	Passing	Bryce Underwood	19/28, 270 yards, TD
Michigan	Rushing	Justice Haynes	19 carries, 117 yards , 2 TD
Michigan	Receiving	Donaven McCulley	6 receptions, 112 yards, TD
Michigan	Defense	Derrick Moore	5 tackles, sack, 1.5 TFL, sack, QB hurry

=== vs Iowa (rivalry) ===
Iowa Hawkeyes (3–2) at Wisconsin Badgers (2–3) – Game summary

Quarter	1	2	3	4	Total
Hawkeyes	17	6	7	7	37
Badgers	0	0	0	0	0

at Camp Randall Stadium • Madison, Wisconsin

- Date: October 11
- Game time: 6:00 p.m.
- Game weather: Sunny, 65 °F (18 °C); Wind: E 6 mph
- Game attendance: 76,064
- Referee: Chris Coyte
- TV announcers (FS1): Eric Collins (play-by-play) and Spencer Tillman (analyst)
- Box Score

Game information

First quarter

- IOWA – Drew Stevens 32-yard field goal, 4:33. Hawkeyes 3–0. 11 plays, 66 yards, 5:29.
- IOWA – Kamari Moulton 6-yard run (Drew Stevens kick), 2:33. Hawkeyes 10–0. 3 plays, 24 yards, 1:19.
- IOWA – Mark Gronowski 1-yard run (Drew Stevens kick), 1:30. Hawkeyes 17–0. 1 play, 1 yard, 0:15.

Second quarter

- IOWA – Drew Stevens 25-yard field goal, 8:44. Hawkeyes 20–0. 9 plays, 22 yards, 5:26.
- IOWA – Drew Stevens 49-yard field goal, 0:00. Hawkeyes 23–0. 9 plays, 63 yards, 1:40.

Third quarter

- IOWA – Xavier Williams 29-yard run (Drew Stevens kick), 10:34. Hawkeyes 30–0. 5 plays, 59 yards, 2:25.

Fourth quarter

- IOWA – Xavier Williams 19-yard run (Drew Stevens kick), 7:25. Hawkeyes 37–0. 10 plays, 46 yards, 4:38.

Statistics	IOWA	WIS
First downs	18	12
Plays–yards	61–319	57–209
Rushes–yards	36–210	36–127
Passing yards	109	82
Passing: comp–att–int	18–25–1	8–21–2
Turnovers	1	3
Time of possession	31:15	28:45

Team	Category	Player	Statistics
Iowa	Passing	Mark Gronowski	17/24, 107 yards, INT
Iowa	Rushing	Kamari Moulton	15 carries, 96 yards, TD
Iowa	Receiving	Kamari Moulton	3 receptions, 29 yards
Iowa	Defense	Karson Sharar	7 tackles, TFL
Wisconsin	Passing	Hunter Simmons	8/21, 82 yards, 2 INT
Wisconsin	Rushing	Dilin Jones	16 carries, 69 yards
Wisconsin	Receiving	Lance Mason	1 reception, 29 yards
Wisconsin	Defense	Christian Alliegro	11 tackles, pass breakup

=== vs No. 1 Ohio State ===
No. 1 Ohio State Buckeyes (6–0) at Wisconsin Badgers (2–4) – Game summary

Quarter	1	2	3	4	Total
No. 1 Buckeyes	17	0	10	7	34
Badgers	0	0	0	0	0

at Camp Randall Stadium • Madison, Wisconsin

- Date: October 18
- Game time: 2:30 p.m.
- Game weather: Sunny, 72 °F (22 °C); Wind: SW 10 mph
- Game attendance: 72,795
- Referee: Jeff Servinski
- TV announcers (CBS): Brad Nessler (play-by-play), Gary Danielson (analyst), and Jenny Dell (sideline)
- Box Score

Game information

First quarter

- OSU – Carnell Tate 33-yard pass from Julian Sayin (Jayden Fielding kick), 8:25 Ohio State 7–0 Drive: 9 plays, 89 yards, 4:34.
- OSU – Jayden Fielding 38-yard field goal, 4:40. Ohio State 10–0. 6 plays, 23 yards, 2:30.
- OSU – Carnell Tate 10-yard pass from Julian Sayin (Jayden Fielding kick), 0:04 Ohio State 17–0 Drive: 6 plays, 70 yards, 2:41.

Second quarter

- No scoring plays.

Third quarter

- OSU – Jayden Fielding 37-yard field goal, 8:42. Ohio State 20–0. 11 plays, 57 yards, 6:18.
- OSU – Will Kacmarek 2-yard pass from Julian Sayin (Jayden Fielding kick), 1:15 Ohio State 27–0 Drive: 13 plays, 83 yards, 6:21.

Fourth quarter

- OSU – Brandon Inniss 13-yard pass from Julian Sayin (Jayden Fielding kick), 5:35 Ohio State 34–0 Drive: 11 plays, 77 yards, 5:32.

Statistics	OSU	WIS
First downs	26	9
Plays–yards	70-491	46-144
Rushes–yards	28-98	31-95
Passing yards	393	49
Passing: comp–att–int	36-42-0	7-15-1
Turnovers	0	1
Time of possession	33:57	26:03

Team	Category	Player	Statistics
Ohio State	Passing	Julian Sayin	36/42, 393 yards, 4 TD
Ohio State	Rushing	Isaiah West	9 carries, 55 yards
Ohio State	Receiving	Carnell Tate	6 receptions, 111 yards, 2 TD
Ohio State	Defense	Arvell Reese	4 tackles, 2 TFL, sack, QB hurry
Wisconsin	Passing	Hunter Simmons	6/12, 54 yards, INT
Wisconsin	Rushing	Gideon Ituka	4 carries, 35 yards
Wisconsin	Receiving	Lance Mason	2 receptions, 31 yards
Wisconsin	Defense	Cooper Catalano	8 tackles, TFL

=== at No. 6 Oregon ===
Wisconsin Badgers (2–5) at No. 6 Oregon Ducks (6–1) – Game summary

Quarter	1	2	3	4	Total
Badgers	0	0	0	7	7
No. 6 Ducks	0	7	7	7	21

at Autzen Stadium • Eugene, Oregon

- Date: October 25
- Game time: 6:00 p.m.
- Game weather: Rain, 51 °F (11 °C); Wind: S 18 mph
- Game attendance: 58,940
- Referee: Jason Nickelby
- TV announcers (FS1): Tim Brando (play-by-play), Devin Gardner (analyst), and Josh Sims (sideline)
- Box Score

Game information

First quarter

- No scoring plays.

Second quarter

- ORE – Jordon Davison 3-yard run (Atticus Sappington kick), 1:07. Oregon 7–0. 16 plays, 99 yards, 8:24.

Third quarter

- ORE – Jordon Davison 20-yard run (Atticus Sappington kick), 12:14. Oregon 14–0. 6 plays, 75 yards, 2:46.

Fourth quarter

- ORE – Gernorris Wilson 1-yard pass from Brock Thomas (Atticus Sappington kick), 14:17 Oregon 21–0 Drive: 5 plays, 54 yards, 2:44.
- WIS – Lance Mason 2-yard pass from Hunter Simmons (Nathanial Vakos kick), 7:57 Oregon 21–7 Drive: 12 plays, 78 yards, 6:14.

Statistics	WIS	ORE
First downs	11	19
Plays–yards	50–196	64–335
Rushes–yards	29–110	45–203
Passing yards	86	132
Passing: comp–att–int	7–21–1	13–19–0
Turnovers	1	0
Time of possession	25:03	34:57

Team	Category	Player	Statistics
Wisconsin	Passing	Hunter Simmons	7/21, 86 yards, TD, INT
Wisconsin	Rushing	Gideon Ituka	21 carries, 85 yards
Wisconsin	Receiving	Lance Mason	2 receptions, 9 yards, TD
Wisconsin	Defense	Mason Posa	13 tackles, pass breakup
Oregon	Passing	Brock Thomas	4/4, 46 yards, TD
Oregon	Rushing	Jordon Davison	16 carries, 102 yards, 2 TD
Oregon	Receiving	Dakorien Moore	3 receptions, 45 yards
Oregon	Defense	Dillon Thieneman	7 tackles, 2 pass breakups

=== vs No. 23 Washington ===
No. 23 Washington Huskies (6–2) at Wisconsin Badgers (2–6) – Game summary

Quarter	1	2	3	4	Total
No. 23 Huskies	0	10	0	0	10
Badgers	0	3	10	0	13

at Camp Randall Stadium • Madison, Wisconsin

- Date: November 8
- Game time: 3:30 p.m.
- Game weather: Cloudy, 40 °F (4 °C); Wind: E 7 mph
- Game attendance: 71,217
- Referee: Bryan Banks
- TV announcers (BTN): Rhett Lewis (play-by-play), Yogi Roth (analyst), and Dannie Rogers (sideline)
- Box Score

Game information

First quarter

- No scoring plays.

Second quarter

- WIS – Nathanial Vakos 42-yard field goal, 13:39. Wisconsin 3–0. 8 plays, 18 yards, 2:58.
- WAS – Grady Gross 42-yard field goal, 9:33. Tie 3–3. 11 plays, 52 yards, 4:06.
- WAS – Denzel Boston 1-yard pass from Demond Williams Jr. (Grady Gross kick), 7:44 Washington 10–3 Drive: 2 plays, 1 yards, 0:34.

Third quarter

- WIS – Carter Smith 2-yard run (Nathanial Vakos kick), 6:26. Tie 10–10. 2 plays, 7 yards, 0:40.
- WIS – Nathanial Vakos 32-yard field goal, 1:58. Wisconsin 13–10. 6 plays, 22 yards, 2:43.

Fourth quarter

- No scoring plays.

Statistics	WASH	WIS
First downs	15	12
Plays–yards	68-251	65-205
Rushes–yards	36-117	47-157
Passing yards	134	48
Passing: comp–att–int	20-32-1	6-18-0
Turnovers	2	0
Time of possession	28:38	31:22

Team	Category	Player	Statistics
Washington	Passing	Demond Williams Jr.	20/32, 134 yards, TD, INT
Washington	Rushing	Demond Williams Jr.	19 carries, 61 yards
Washington	Receiving	Denzel Boston	8 receptions, 62 yards, TD
Washington	Defense	Xe'ree Alexander	10 tackles, TFL
Wisconsin	Passing	Sean West	1/1, 24 yards
Wisconsin	Rushing	Gideon Ituka	19 carries, 73 yards
Wisconsin	Receiving	Jackson Acker	3 receptions, 27 yards
Wisconsin	Defense	Mason Posa	11 tackles, 2.5 sacks, 2.5 TFL, FF, FR, pass breakup

=== at No. 2 Indiana ===
Wisconsin Badgers (3–6) at No. 2 Indiana Hoosiers (10–0) – Game summary

Quarter	1	2	3	4	Total
Badgers	0	7	0	0	7
No. 2 Hoosiers	7	3	14	7	31

at Memorial Stadium • Bloomington, Indiana

- Date: November 15
- Game time: 11:00 a.m.
- Game weather: Sunny, 69 °F (21 °C); Wind: S 15 mph
- Game attendance: 55,042
- Referee: Jason Nickleby
- TV announcers (BTN): Jeff Levering (play-by-play), Jake Butt (analyst), and Brooke Fletcher (sideline)
- Box Score

Game information

First quarter

- IU – Charlie Becker 31-yard pass from Fernando Mendoza (Nicolas Radicic kick), 2:56 Hoosiers 7–0. Drive: 9 plays, 72 yards, 4:25.

Second quarter

- WIS – Lance Mason 45-yard pass from Carter Smith (Nathanial Vakos kick), 2:56 Tied 7–7. Drive: 8 plays, 79 yards, 4:04.
- IU – Nicolas Radicic 37-yard field goal, 0:55. Hoosiers 10–7. Drive: 9 plays, 56 yards, 2:47.

Third quarter

- IU – Holden Staes 2-yard pass from Fernando Mendoza (Nicolas Radicic kick), 10:19 Hoosiers 17–7. Drive: 9 plays, 75 yards, 4:41.
- IU – Riley Nowakowski 21-yard pass from Fernando Mendoza (Nicolas Radicic kick), 4:44 Hoosiers 24–7. Drive: 1 play, 21 yards, 0:08.

Fourth quarter

- IU – Omar Cooper 5-yard pass from Fernando Mendoza (Nicolas Radicic kick), 5:21 Hoosiers 31–7. Drive: 7 plays, 48 yards, 4:41.

Statistics	WIS	IU
First downs	8	19
Plays–yards	45–168	62–388
Rushes–yards	30–70	37–83
Passing yards	98	305
Passing: comp–att–int	9–15–1	23–25–0
Turnovers	2	0
Time of possession	26:02	33:58

Team	Category	Player	Statistics
Wisconsin	Passing	Carter Smith	9/15, 98 yards, TD, INT
Wisconsin	Rushing	Gideon Ituka	9 carries, 32 yards
Wisconsin	Receiving	Lance Mason	1 reception, 45 yards, TD
Wisconsin	Defense	Mason Posa	12 tackles, sack, TFL
Indiana	Passing	Fernando Mendoza	22/24, 299 yards, 4 TD
Indiana	Rushing	Roman Hemby	14 carries, 58 yards
Indiana	Receiving	Charlie Becker	5 receptions, 108 yards, TD
Indiana	Defense	Rolijah Hardy	6 tackles, sack, TFL, QB hurry, pass breakup

=== vs No. 21 Illinois ===
No. 21 Illinois Fighting Illini (7–3) at Wisconsin Badgers (3–7) – Game summary

Quarter	1	2	3	4	Total
No. 21 Fighting Illini	0	7	3	0	10
Badgers	7	3	7	10	27

at Camp Randall Stadium • Madison, Wisconsin

- Date: November 22
- Game time: 6:30 p.m.
- Game weather: Clear, 43 °F (6 °C); Wind: SW 13 mph
- Game attendance: 67,876
- Referee: Kole Knueppel
- TV announcers (BTN): Rhett Lewis (play-by-play), Anthony Herron (analyst) and Dannie Rogers (sideline)
- Box Score

Game information

First quarter

- WIS – Vinny Anthony II 6-yard run (Nathanial Vakos kick), 1:21. Wisconsin 7–0. 16 plays, 80 yards, 9:30.

Second quarter

- ILL – Luke Altmyer 12-yard run (David Olano kick), 5:45. Tie 7–7. 7 plays, 55 yards, 3:08.
- WIS – Nathanial Vakos 47-yard field goal, 0:14. Wisconsin 10–7. 5 plays, 17 yards, 0:36.

Third quarter

- WIS – Darrion Dupree 84-yard run (Nathanial Vakos kick), 9:40. Wisconsin 17–7. 2 plays, 84 yards, 0:10.
- ILL – David Olano 24-yard field goal, 1:23. Wisconsin 17–10. 10 plays, 67 yards, 4:30.

Fourth quarter

- WIS – Darrion Dupree 4-yard run (Nathanial Vakos kick), 8:16. Wisconsin 24–10. 4 plays, 14 yards, 1:56.
- WIS – Nathanial Vakos 32-yard field goal, 4:23. Wisconsin 27–10. 7 plays, 31 yards, 2:24.

Statistics	ILL	WIS
First downs	19	14
Plays–yards	64-298	59-301
Rushes–yards	29-50	44-209
Passing yards	248	92
Passing: comp–att–int	21-35-0	11-15-0
Turnovers	0	0
Time of possession	28:15	31:45

Team	Category	Player	Statistics
Illinois	Passing	Luke Altmyer	21/35, 248 yards
Illinois	Rushing	Luke Altmyer	13 carries, 20 yards, TD
Illinois	Receiving	Hank Beatty	7 receptions, 47 yards
Illinois	Defense	Matthew Bailey	10 tackles, FF
Wisconsin	Passing	Carter Smith	9/11, 75 yards
Wisconsin	Rushing	Darrion Dupree	17 carries, 131 yards, 2 TD
Wisconsin	Receiving	Trech Kekahuna	5 receptions, 39 yards
Wisconsin	Defense	Darryl Peterson	6 tackles, 3 sacks, 3 TFL, FF, 2 QB hurries, 2 pass breakups

=== at Minnesota (Paul Bunyan's Axe) ===
Wisconsin Badgers (4–7) at Minnesota Golden Gophers (6–5) – Game summary

Quarter	1	2	3	4	Total
Badgers	0	7	0	0	7
Golden Gophers	0	10	7	0	17

at Huntington Bank Stadium • Minneapolis, Minnesota

- Date: November 29
- Game time: 2:30 p.m.
- Game weather: Snow, 23 °F (−5 °C); Wind: SW 10 mph
- Game attendance: 46,038
- Referee: Tim O'Dey
- TV announcers (FS1): Noah Reed (play-by-play) and Robert Smith (analyst)
- Box Score

Game information

First quarter

- No scoring plays.

Second quarter

- MIN – Brady Denaburg 33-yard field goal, 6:32. Minnesota 7–0. 7 plays, 20 yards, 3:54.
- MIN – Darius Taylor 49-yard run (Brady Denaburg kick), 2:45. Minnesota 10–0. 3 plays, 55 yards, 1:27.
- WIS – Jackson Acker 1-yard pass from Carter Smith (Nathanial Vakos kick), 0:21 Minnesota 10–7 Drive: 7 plays, 75 yards, 2:24.

Third quarter

- MIN – Jameson Geers 13-yard pass from Drake Lindsey (Brady Denaburg kick), 5:04 Minnesota 17–7 Drive: 3 plays, 16 yards, 1:22.

Fourth quarter

- No scoring plays.

Statistics	WIS	MINN
First downs	11	13
Plays–yards	55–268	56–218
Rushes–yards	28–86	32–128
Passing yards	182	90
Passing: comp–att–int	17–27–2	18–24–0
Turnovers	3	0
Time of possession	29:28	30:32

Team	Category	Player	Statistics
Wisconsin	Passing	Carter Smith	5/8, 20 yards, TD
Wisconsin	Rushing	Darrion Dupree	12 carries, 51 yards
Wisconsin	Receiving	Vinny Anthony II	4 receptions, 92 yards
Wisconsin	Defense	Cooper Catalano	10 tackles
Minnesota	Passing	Drake Lindsey	18/24, 90 yards, TD
Minnesota	Rushing	Darius Taylor	19 carries, 100 yards, TD
Minnesota	Receiving	Jameson Geers	4 receptions, 27 yards, TD
Minnesota	Defense	John Nestor	9 tackles, 2 TFL, 2 INT, FR
