= 2025 Middle Tennessee Blue Raiders football team =

American college football season

2025 Middle Tennessee Blue Raiders football
- Conference: Conference USA
- Record: 3–9 (2–6 CUSA)
- Head coach: Derek Mason (2nd season)
- Offensive coordinator: Bodie Reeder (2nd season)
- Offensive scheme: Spread
- Defensive coordinator: Brian Stewart (2nd season)
- Base defense: 3–4
- Home stadium: Johnny "Red" Floyd Stadium

2025 Conference USA football standings
	Conf.			Overall
Team	W		L	W		L
Kennesaw State y$	7	–	1	10	–	4
Jacksonville State y	7	–	1	9	–	5
Western Kentucky	6	–	2	9	–	4
Louisiana Tech	5	–	3	8	–	5
FIU	5	–	3	7	–	6
Missouri State	5	–	3	7	–	6
Delaware	4	–	4	7	–	6
Liberty	3	–	5	4	–	8
New Mexico State	2	–	6	4	–	8
Middle Tennessee	2	–	6	3	–	9
Sam Houston	1	–	7	2	–	10
UTEP	1	–	7	2	–	10
Championship: Kennesaw State 19, Jacksonville State 15
$ – Conference champion; y – Championship game participant

The 2025 Middle Tennessee Blue Raiders football team represented Middle Tennessee State University as a member of Conference USA (CUSA) during the 2025 NCAA Division I FBS football season. The Blue Raiders were led by Derek Mason in his second year as the head coach. The Blue Raiders played home games at Johnny "Red" Floyd Stadium, located in Murfreesboro, Tennessee.

== Offseason ==
=== Transfers ===
==== Outgoing ====
Player	Position	Destination
Devyn Curtis	LB	Arkansas State
Ethan Crite	WR	Austin Peay
Josh Evans	WR	Bethune–Cookman
Sam Driggers	WR	Central Arkansas
Luther Richesson	QB	Central Arkansas
Xavier Williams	S	Cincinnati
Drew Francis	LB	East Tennessee State
Taharin Sudderth	DL	East Tennessee State
James Monds III	DB	Eastern Michigan
Dumela Knox	OL	Ferris State
Julius Pierce	OT	FIU
Tyrell Raby	DB	Grambling State
Amarrien Bailey	LB	Hinds CC
Kedrick Burley	DL	Keiser
Grant Chadwick	P	LSU
Javonte Sherman	WR	Mars Hill
Marvae Myers	DB	Marshall
Morgan Scott	OT	Marshall
Frank Peasant	RB	Memphis
Omari Kelly	WR	Michigan State
Ayden Merrihew	OL	Northern Colorado
Kellen Stewart	WR	Prairie View A&M
James Gillespie	DT	Sacramento State
James Shellman IV	DB	Savannah State
James Stewart	DE	Tennessee State
Caleb Reid	LB	Tennessee State
Shamar Crawford	OL	Tennessee State
Simon Wilson	OL	Tulsa
Jordan Beasley	S	UT Martin
Jordan Thompson	LB	Western Carolina
Jacob Coleman	TE	Unknown
Terry Wilkins	RB	Unknown
J’Shun Bodiford	OL	Unknown
John Howse IV	S	Unknown
Tyson Resper	WR	Unknown
Da'Shawn Elder	DB	Unknown
Jalen Jackson	DB	Unknown
Nolan Forsha	LB	Unknown

==== Incoming ====
Player	Position	Previous school
AJ Jones	WR	Arizona
E.J. Harris	OL	Auburn
Alex Mitchell	LB	Chattanooga
Juwon Gaston	CB	Houston
Hunter Tipton	TE	Louisiana Tech
Amorion Walker	WR	Michigan
Brett Brown	QB	Missouri
Ikani Tuiono	OL	Nebraska–Kearney
Kevin Miniefield Jr.	DB	Northern Arizona
Joseph Habinowski	OL	Ohio
Ashton Logan	P	Oklahoma
Tayvion Galloway	TE	Purdue
Jacob Otts	OL	Rhode Island
Rickey Hunt Jr.	RB	Tulsa
Tyree Patterson	WR	UCF
Kason Stokes	WR	UCF

== Schedule ==
Date	Time	Opponent	Site	TV	Result	Attendance
August 30	6:00 p.m.	Austin Peay*	Johnny "Red" Floyd Stadium; Murfreesboro, TN	ESPN+	L 14–34	18,505
September 6	3:00 p.m.	at Wisconsin*	Camp Randall Stadium; Madison, WI	FS1	L 10–42	70,368
September 13	4:00 p.m.	at Nevada*	Mackay Stadium; Reno, NV	KNSN-TV	W 14–13	16,808
September 20	6:00 p.m.	Marshall*^{†}	Johnny "Red" Floyd Stadium; Murfreesboro, TN	ESPN+	L 28–42	15,168
September 27	5:00 p.m.	at Kennesaw State	Fifth Third Stadium; Kennesaw, GA	ESPN+	L 16–24	11,040
October 8	6:30 p.m.	Missouri State	Johnny "Red" Floyd Stadium; Murfreesboro, TN	ESPN2	L 20–22	9,806
October 22	6:30 p.m.	at Delaware	Delaware Stadium; Newark, DE	ESPN2	L 28–31	14,102
October 29	6:30 p.m.	Jacksonville State	Johnny "Red" Floyd Stadium; Murfreesboro, TN	ESPN2	L 21–24	10,200
November 8	2:00 p.m.	FIU	Johnny "Red" Floyd Stadium; Murfreesboro, TN	ESPN+	L 30–56	12,227
November 15	2:30 p.m.	at Western Kentucky	Houchens Industries–L. T. Smith Stadium; Bowling Green, KY (100 Miles of Hate)	ESPN+	L 26–42	16,547
November 22	2:00 p.m.	Sam Houston	Johnny "Red" Floyd Stadium; Murfreesboro, TN	ESPN+	W 31–17	7,605
November 29	2:00 p.m.	at New Mexico State	Aggie Memorial Stadium; Las Cruces, NM	ESPN+	W 31–24 ^{OT}	7,381
*Non-conference game; ^{†}Homecoming; All times are in Central time

== Game summaries ==
=== vs. Austin Peay (FCS) ===
Game One – Austin Peay Governors (FCS) (0–0) at Middle Tennessee Blue Raiders (0–0) – Game summary

Quarter	1	2	3	4	Total
Governors (FCS)	14	7	3	10	34
Blue Raiders	0	7	7	0	14

at Johnny "Red" Floyd Stadium • Murfreesboro, TN

- Date: Saturday August 30, 2025
- Game time: 6:00 p.m.
- Game weather: Wind: NW at 12 miles per hour (19 km/h) • Weather: Sunny • Temp: 83 °F (28 °C)
- Game attendance: 18,505
- TV announcers (ESPN+): Jake Rose, Jeremy Kellem, and Justin Beasley

Game information

First quarter

- APSU – Jaden Robinson 22-yard pass from Chris Parson (Carson Smith kick), 9:45. Governors 7–0. Drive: 7 plays, 63 yards, 3:51.
- APSU – Courtland Simmons 1-yard run (Carson Smith kick), 2:38. Governors 14–0. Drive: 8 plays, 53 yards, 3:06.

Second quarter

- APSU – Jackson Head 4-yard pass from Chris Parson (Carson Smith kick), 6:03. Governors 21–0. Drive: 17 plays, 89 yards, 9:30.
- MTSU – Nahzae Cox 5-yard pass from Nicholas Vattiato (Jacob Hathaway kick), 0:45. Governors 21–7. Drive: 6 plays, 67 yards, 1:34.

Third quarter

- APSU – Carson Smith 40-yard field goal, 11:04. Governors 24–7. Drive: 9 plays, 52 yards, 3:56.
- MTSU – Nahzae Cox 14-yard pass from Nicholas Vattiato (Jacob Hathaway kick), 2:56. Governors 24–14. Drive: 5 plays, 44 yards, 2:06.

Fourth quarter

- APSU – Carson Smith 36-yard field goal, 12:48. Governors 27–14. Drive: 5 plays, 25 yards, 2:07.
- APSU – Austin Smith 2-yard run (Carson Smith kick), 7:42. Governors 34–14. Drive: 7 plays, 28 yards, 3:52.

Statistics	APSU	MTSU
First downs	19	13
Plays–yards	74–343	59–153
Rushes–yards	47–150	22–44
Passing yards	193	109
Passing: Comp–Att–Int	14–27–0	16–37–0
Turnovers	0	0
Time of possession	38:35	21:25

Team	Category	Player	Statistics
Austin Peay	Passing	Chris Parson	11/20, 142 yards, 2 TD
Austin Peay	Rushing	Courtland Simmons	10 carries, 35 yards, TD
Austin Peay	Receiving	Shemar Kirk	3 receptions, 69 yards
Middle Tennessee	Passing	Nicholas Vattiato	15/36, 104 yards, 2 TD
Middle Tennessee	Rushing	Jekail Middlebrook	11 carries, 48 yards
Middle Tennessee	Receiving	Nahzae Cox	6 receptions, 50 yards, 2 TD

=== at Wisconsin ===
Game Two – Middle Tennessee Blue Raiders (0–1) at Wisconsin Badgers (1–0) – Game summary

Quarter	1	2	3	4	Total
Blue Raiders	3	7	0	0	10
Badgers	0	14	14	14	42

at Camp Randall Stadium • Madison, WI

- Date: Saturday September 6, 2025
- Game time: 3:00 p.m.
- Game weather: Cloudy, 63 °F (17 °C); Wind: NW 12 mph
- Game attendance: 70,368
- Referee: Jeff Servinski
- TV announcers (FS1): Eric Collins (play-by-play) and Spencer Tillman (analyst)

Game information

First quarter

- MTSU – Jacob Hathaway 27-yard field goal, 4:13. Middle Tennessee 3–0. Drive: 12 plays, 68 yards, 5:39.

Second quarter

- WIS – Tyrell Henry 3-yard pass from Danny O'Neil (Nathanial Vakos kick), 8:16 Wisconsin 7–3 Drive: 11 plays, 80 yards, 5:44.
- WIS – Dilin Jones 1-yard run (Nathanial Vakos kick), 2:07 Wisconsin 14–3 Drive: 9 plays, 38 yards, 4:57.
- MTSU – Hunter Tipton 4-yard pass from Nicholas Vattiato (Jacob Hathaway kick), 1:05 Wisconsin 14–10 Drive: 2 plays, 11 yards, 0:10.

Third quarter

- WIS – Trech Kekahuna 61-yard run (Nathanial Vakos kick), 7:26 Wisconsin 21–10 Drive: 2 plays, 75 yards, 0:52.
- WIS – Vinny Anthony II 14-yard run (Nathanial Vakos kick), 2:44 Wisconsin 28–10 Drive: 5 plays, 50 yards, 2:34.

Fourth quarter

- WIS – Jayden Ballard 58-yard pass from Danny O'Neil (Nathanial Vakos kick), 10:24 Wisconsin 35–10 Drive: 7 plays, 99 yards, 3:41.
- WIS – Lance Mason 17-yard pass from Danny O'Neil (Nathanial Vakos kick), 5:48 Wisconsin 42–10 Drive: 7 plays, 53 yards, 3:33.

Statistics	MTSU	WIS
First downs	14	21
Plays–yards	60–241	58–436
Rushes–yards	28–33	31–153
Passing yards	208	283
Passing: comp–att–int	21–32–1	23–27–1
Turnovers	1	2
Time of possession	29:17	30:43

Team	Category	Player	Statistics
Middle Tennessee	Passing	Nicholas Vattiato	20/31, 197 yards, TD, INT
Middle Tennessee	Rushing	Jekail Middlebrook	12 carries, 27 yards
Middle Tennessee	Receiving	Nahzae Cox	3 receptions, 75 yards
Wisconsin	Passing	Danny O'Neil	23/27, 283 yards, 3 TD, INT
Wisconsin	Rushing	Dilin Jones	10 carries, 36 yards, TD
Wisconsin	Receiving	Lance Mason	7 receptions, 102 yards, TD

=== at Nevada ===
Game Three – Middle Tennessee Blue Raiders (0–2) at Nevada Wolf Pack (1–1) – Game summary

Quarter	1	2	3	4	Total
Blue Raiders	0	0	0	14	14
Wolf Pack	0	13	0	0	13

at Mackay Stadium • Reno, NV

- Date: Saturday September 13, 2025
- Game time: 4:00 p.m.
- Game weather: Sunny • Temperature: 78 °F (26 °C) • Wind: SE at 3 miles per hour (4.8 km/h)
- Game attendance: 16,808
- Referee: Kenneth Ray
- TV announcers (KNSN-TV): Alex Margulies (play-by-play), Lucas Weber (analyst) and Shannon Kelly (sideline)
- Box score, Recap

Game information

First quarter

- No scoring plays.

Second quarter

- (14:52) NEV – Ky Woods 47-yard pass from Chubba Purdy, Joe McFadden kick (Drive: 1 play, 47 yards, 0:08; Nevada 7–0)
- (8:59) NEV – Joe McFadden 38-yard field goal (Drive: 6 plays, 46 yards, 2:36; Nevada 10–0)
- (1:02) NEV – Joe McFadden 33-yard field goal (Drive: 7 plays, 18 yards, 2:44; Nevada 13–0)

Third quarter

- No scoring plays.

Fourth quarter

- (14:52) MTSU – Nahzae Cox 13-yard pass from Nicholas Vattiato, Jacob Hathaway kick (Drive: 10 plays, 60 yards, 3:59; Nevada 13–7)
- (14:52) MTSU – Nicholas Vattiato 5-yard run, Jacob Hathaway kick (Drive: 11 plays, 76 yards, 1:54; Middle Tennessee 14–13)

Statistics	MTSU	NEV
First downs	23	16
Plays–yards	75–352	60–369
Rushes–yards	30–105	35–203
Passing yards	247	166
Passing: Comp–Att–Int	27–45–1	14–25–2
Turnovers	1	2
Time of possession	31:10	28:50

Team	Category	Player	Statistics
Middle Tennessee	Passing	Nicholas Vattiato	27/44, 247 yards, TD, INT
Middle Tennessee	Rushing	Jekail Middlebrook	10 carries, 67 yards
Middle Tennessee	Receiving	Myles Butler	7 receptions, 65 yards
Nevada	Passing	Chubba Purdy	5/7, 88 yards, TD, INT
Nevada	Rushing	Herschel Turner	12 carries, 90 yards
Nevada	Receiving	Jordan Brown	5 receptions, 58 yards

=== vs. Marshall ===
Game Four – Marshall Thundering Herd (1–2) at Middle Tennessee Blue Raiders (1–2) – Game summary

Quarter	1	2	3	4	Total
Thundering Herd	21	0	0	21	42
Blue Raiders	14	6	8	0	28

at Johnny "Red" Floyd Stadium • Murfreesboro, Tennessee

- Date: Saturday September 20, 2025
- Game time: 6:00 p.m.
- Game weather: Cloudy • Temperature: 83 °F (28 °C) • Wind: S 3 mph
- Game attendance: 15,168
- Referee: Trennis Livingston
- TV announcers (ESPN+): Jake Rose (play-by-play), Jeremy Kellem (analyst) and Justin Beasley (sideline)

Game information

First quarter

- (8:47) MRSH – Toby Payne 3-yard pass from Carlos Del Rio-Wilson, Lorcan Quinn kick (Drive: 7 plays, 40 yards, 3:15; Marshall 7–0)
- (7:57) MTSU – Nazhae Cox 3-yard pass from Nicholas Vattiato, Jacob Hathaway kick (Drive: 2 plays, 75 yards, 0:50; Tied 7–7)
- (6:51) MRSH – Demarcus Lacey 68-yard pass from Carlos Del Rio-Wilson, Lorcan Quinn kick (Drive: 3 plays, 75 yards, 1:06; Marshall 14–7)
- (6:03) MTSU – Amorion Walker 41-yard pass from Nicholas Vattiato, Jacob Hathaway kick (Drive: 2 plays, 75 yards, 0:48; Tied 14–14)
- (1:05) MRSH – Carlos Del Rio-Wilson 2-yard run, Lorcan Quinn kick (Drive: 9 plays, 75 yards, 4:58; Marshall 21–14)

Second quarter

- (9:36) MTSU – Jacob Hathaway 50-yard field goal (Drive: 7 plays, 49 yards, 2:46; Marshall 21–17)
- (1:37) MTSU – Jacob Hathaway 38-yard field goal (Drive: 11 plays, 45 yards, 5:06; Marshall 21–20)

Third quarter

- (5:54) MTSU – Nicholas Vattiato 3-yard run, Hunter Tipton pass from Nicholas Vattiato (Drive: 5 plays, 67 yards, 2:29; Middle Tennessee 28–21)

Fourth quarter

- (14:54) MRSH – Toby Payne 4-yard pass from Carlos Del Rio-Wilson, Lorcan Quinn kick (Drive: 12 plays, 65 yards, 6:00; Tied 28–28)
- (8:47) MRSH – De'Andre Tamarez 24-yard pass from Carlos Del Rio-Wilson, Lorcan Quinn kick (Drive: 7 plays, 56 yards, 3:05; Marshall 35–28)
- (4:38) MRSH – Michael Allen 11-yard run, Lorcan Quinn kick (Drive: 6 plays, 67 yards, 3:48; Marshall 42–28)

Statistics	MRSH	MTSU
First downs	27	14
Plays–yards	71–449	48–373
Rushes–yards	49–188	15–74
Passing yards	261	299
Passing: Comp–Att–Int	18–22–0	19–33–1
Turnovers	1	1
Time of possession	36:47	22:13

Team	Category	Player	Statistics
Marshall	Passing	Carlos Del Rio-Wilson	18/22, 261 yards, 4 TD
Marshall	Rushing	Michael Allen	21 carries, 90 yards, TD
Marshall	Receiving	Demarcus Lacey	5 receptions, 116 yards, TD
Middle Tennessee	Passing	Nicholas Vattiato	19/32, 299 yards, 2 TD, INT
Middle Tennessee	Rushing	Jekail Middlebrook	6 carries, 89 yards
Middle Tennessee	Receiving	Nahzae Cox	6 receptions, 94 yards, TD

=== at Kennesaw State ===
Game Five – Middle Tennessee Blue Raiders (1–3) at Kennesaw State Owls (2–2) – Game summary

Quarter	1	2	3	4	Total
Blue Raiders	3	7	0	6	16
Owls	21	0	0	3	24

at Fifth Third Stadium • Kennesaw, GA

- Date: Saturday September 27, 2025
- Game time: 5:00 p.m.
- Game attendance: 11,040
- Referee: Rodney Burnette
- TV announcers (ESPN+): Nolan Alexander (play-by-play), Caleb O'Neal (analyst) and Lexi Bowden (sideline)

Game information

First quarter

- KENN – Gerard Bullock Jr. 13-yard pass from Christian Moss (Britton Williams kick), 13:25. Owls 7–0. Drive: 3 plays, 30 yards, O:39.
- KENN – Chase Belcher 53-yard pass from Amari Odom (Britton Williams kick), 9:06. Owls 14–0. Drive: 5 plays, 87 yards, 1:25.
- MTSU – Jacob Hathaway 34-yard field goal, 3:43. Owls 14–3. Drive: 9 plays, 59 yards, 4:31.
- KENN – Gabriel Benyard 29-yard pass from Amari Odom (Britton Williams kick), 0:11. Owls 21–3. Drive: 3 plays, 62 yards, 0:56.

Second quarter

- MTSU – Jekail Middlebrook 10-yard run (Jacob Hathaway kick), 4:17. Owls 21–10. Drive: 7 plays, 30 yards, 3:31.

Third quarter

- No scoring plays.

Fourth quarter

- MTSU – Jekail Middlebrook 9-yard run (pass failed), 14:56. Owls 21–16. Drive: 12 plays, 89 yards, 5:58.
- KENN – Britton Williams 39-yard field goal, 10:43. Owls 24–16. Drive: 10 plays, 54 yards, 4:13.

Statistics	MTSU	KENN
First downs	24	17
Plays–yards	79–460	51–334
Rushes–yards	37–155	31–157
Passing yards	305	177
Passing: Comp–Att–Int	28–42–1	13–20–0
Turnovers	2	1
Time of possession	38:59	21:01

Team	Category	Player	Statistics
Middle Tennessee	Passing	Nicholas Vattiato	27/41, 278 yards, INT
Middle Tennessee	Rushing	Jekail Middlebrook	20 carries, 109 yards, 2 TD
Middle Tennessee	Receiving	Cam'ron Lacy	8 receptions, 96 yards
Kennesaw State	Passing	Amari Odom	11/17, 162 yards, 2 TD
Kennesaw State	Rushing	Coleman Bennett	12 carries, 101 yards
Kennesaw State	Receiving	Chase Belcher	1 reception, 53 yards, TD

=== vs. Missouri State ===
Game Six – Missouri State Bears (2–3) at Middle Tennessee Blue Raiders (1–4) – Game summary

Quarter	1	2	3	4	Total
Bears	0	16	3	3	22
Blue Raiders	3	10	0	7	20

at Johnny "Red" Floyd Stadium • Murfreesboro, TN

- Date: Wednesday October 8, 2025
- Game time: 6:30 p.m.
- Game weather: Clear • Temperature: 67 °F (19 °C) • Wind: NE 7 mph
- Game attendance: 9,806
- Referee: Rory Bernard
- TV announcers (ESPN2): Clay Matvick (play-by-play), Chase Daniel (analyst) and Victoria Arlen (sideline)

Game information

First quarter

- (10:42) MTSU – Jacob Hathaway 45-yard field goal (Drive: 8 plays, 38 yards, 4:18; Middle Tennessee 3–0)

Second quarter

- (11:27) MOST – Deuce Bailey 5-yard run (Drive: 3 plays, 24 yards, 0:56; Missouri State 6–3)
- (10:06) MTSU – Cam'ron Lacy 52-yard pass from Nicholas Vattiato, Jacob Hathaway kick (Drive: 3 plays, 82 yards, 1:12; Middle Tennessee 10–6)
- (5:29) MOST – Ronnel Johnson 20-yard pass from Deuce Bailey, Yousef Obeid kick (Drive: 10 plays, 79 yards, 4:31; Missouri State 13–10)
- (1:05) MOST – Yousef Obeid 39-yard field goal (Drive: 8 plays, 71 yards, 2:43; Missouri State 16–10)
- (0:00) MTSU – Jacob Hathaway 40-yard field goal (Drive: 9 plays, 56 yards, 0:59; Missouri State 16–13)

Third quarter

- (12:33) MOST – Yousef Obeid 25-yard field goal (Drive: 5 plays, 80 yards, 2:20; Missouri State 19–13)

Fourth quarter

- (9:12) MTSU – Cam'ron Lacy 10-yard pass from Nicholas Vattiato, Jacob Hathaway kick (Drive: 11 plays, 72 yards, 5:58; Middle Tennessee 20–19)
- (4:19) MOST – Yousef Obeid 29-yard field goal (Drive: 10 plays, 56 yards, 4:45; Missouri State 22–20)

Statistics	MOST	MTSU
First downs	19	22
Plays–yards	66–348	68–353
Rushes–yards	35–70	25–86
Passing yards	278	267
Passing: Comp–Att–Int	16–31–0	30–43–0
Turnovers	0	1
Time of possession	30:42	29:18

Team	Category	Player	Statistics
Missouri State	Passing	Deuce Bailey	16/31, 278 yards, TD
Missouri State	Rushing	Shomari Lawrence	11 carries, 63 yards
Missouri State	Receiving	Ramone Green Jr.	1 reception, 76 yards
Middle Tennessee	Passing	Nicholas Vattiato	30/42, 267 yards, 2 TD
Middle Tennessee	Rushing	Jekail Middlebrook	17 carries, 93 yards
Middle Tennessee	Receiving	Cam'ron Lacy	6 receptions, 114 yards, 2 TD

=== at Delaware ===
Game Seven – Middle Tennessee Blue Raiders (1–5) at Delaware Fightin' Blue Hens (3–3) – Game summary

Quarter	1	2	3	4	Total
Blue Raiders	14	0	7	7	28
Fightin' Blue Hens	7	17	7	0	31

at Delaware Stadium • Newark, DE

- Date: Wednesday October 22, 2025
- Game time: 6:30 p.m.
- Game weather: Clear, 56 °F (13 °C)
- Game attendance: 14,102
- Referee: Garrett Dickerson
- TV announcers (ESPN2): Jay Alter (play-by-play) and Rocky Boiman (analyst)

Game information

First quarter

- (8:28) DEL – Sean Wilson 22-yard pass from Nick Minicucci, Nate Reed kick (Drive: 10 plays, 89 yards, 5:08; Delaware 7–0)
- (2:59) MTSU – Nahzae Cox 5-yard pass from Nicholas Vattiato, Jacob Hathaway kick (Drive: 12 plays, 76 yards, 5:24; Tied 7–7)
- (1:58) MTSU – Jekail Middlebrook 4-yard run, Jacob Hathaway kick (Drive: 2 plays, 17 yards, 0:51; Middle Tennessee 14–7)

Second quarter

- (11:39) DEL – Sean Wilson 10-yard pass from Nick Minicucci, Nate Reed kick (Drive: 11 plays, 75 yards, 5:19; Tied 14–14)
- (6:25) DEL – Nate Reed 49-yard field goal (Drive: 11 plays, 48 yards, 3:26; Delaware 17–14)
- (0:38) DEL – Kyre Duplessis 4-yard pass from Nick Minicucci, Nate Reed kick (Drive: 10 plays, 78 yards, 1:35; Delaware 24–14)

Third quarter

- (5:11) MTSU – Hunter Tipton 11-yard pass from Nicholas Vattiato, Jacob Hathaway kick (Drive: 5 plays, 39 yards, 1:41; Delaware 24–21)
- (1:39) DEL – Kyre Duplessis 9-yard pass from Nick Minicucci, Nate Reed kick (Drive: 9 plays, 75 yards, 3:32; Delaware 31–21)

Fourth quarter

- (1:03) MTSU – AJ Jones 6-yard pass from Nicholas Vattiato, Jacob Hathaway kick (Drive: 11 plays, 89 yards, 1:35; Delaware 31–28)

Statistics	MTSU	DEL
First downs	24	27
Plays–yards	72–384	80–360
Rushes–yards	22–103	36–79
Passing yards	281	281
Passing: Comp–Att–Int	31–50–1	28–44–1
Turnovers	2	2
Time of possession	27:05	32:55

Team	Category	Player	Statistics
Middle Tennessee	Passing	Nicholas Vattiato	31/48, 281 yards, 3 TD, INT
Middle Tennessee	Rushing	Jekail Middlebrook	11 carries, 68 yards, TD
Middle Tennessee	Receiving	Hunter Tipton	5 receptions, 56 yards, TD
Delaware	Passing	Nick Minicucci	27/42, 276 yards, 4 TD
Delaware	Rushing	Jo Silver	14 carries, 51 yards
Delaware	Receiving	Kyre Duplessis	7 receptions, 65 yards, 2 TD

=== vs. Jacksonville State ===
Game Eight – Jacksonville State Gamecocks (4–3) at Middle Tennessee Blue Raiders (1–6) – Game summary

Quarter	1	2	3	4	Total
Gamecocks	0	7	0	17	24
Blue Raiders	6	0	8	7	21

at Johnny "Red" Floyd Stadium • Murfreesboro, TN

- Date: Wednesday October 29, 2025
- Game time: 6:30 p.m.
- Game attendance: 10,200
- Referee: Rodney Burnett
- TV announcers (ESPN2): Clay Matvick (play-by-play) and Chase Daniel (analyst)

Game information

First quarter

- MTSU – DJ Taylor 10-yard pass from Nicholas Vattiato (run failed), 4:05. Blue Raiders 6–0. Drive: 7 plays, 54 yards, 3:11.

Second quarter

- JVST – Deondre Johnson 56-yard pass from Gavin Wimsatt (Garrison Rippa kick), 7:25. Gamecocks 7–6. Drive: 4 plays, 82 yards, 1:32.

Third quarter

- MTSU – Jekail Middlebrook 2-yard pass from Nicholas Vattiato (Nicholas Vattiato–Hunter Tipton pass), 5:32. Blue Raiders 14–7. Drive: 11 plays, 80 yards, 5:34.

Fourth quarter

- JVST – Garrison Rippa 47-yard field goal, 13:29. Blue Raiders 14–10. Drive: 14 plays, 45 yards, 7:03.
- JVST – Deondre Johnson 30-yard pass from Caden Creel (Garrison Rippa kick), 10:06. Gamecocks 17–14. Drive: 4 plays, 73 yards, 1:47.
- MTSU – Jekail Middlebrook 6-yard run (Jacob Hathaway kick), 7:45. Blue Raiders 21–17. Drive: 6 plays, 75 yards, 2:21.
- JVST – Cam Cook 3-yard run (Garrison Rippa kick), 4:29. Gamecocks 24–21. Drive: 7 plays, 65 yards, 3:15.

Statistics	JVST	MTSU
First downs	17	18
Plays–yards	70–356	67–319
Rushes–yards	49–141	22–84
Passing yards	215	235
Passing: Comp–Att–Int	15–21–0	23–45–1
Turnovers	0	1
Time of possession	33:00	27:00

Team	Category	Player	Statistics
Jacksonville State	Passing	Caden Creel	13/19, 139 yards, TD
Jacksonville State	Rushing	Cam Cook	21 carries, 103 yards, TD
Jacksonville State	Receiving	Deondre Johnson	4 receptions, 131 yards, 2 TD
Middle Tennessee	Passing	Nicholas Vattiato	23/45, 235 yards, 2 TD, INT
Middle Tennessee	Rushing	Jekail Middlebrook	10 carries, 20 yards, TD
Middle Tennessee	Receiving	Jekail Middlebrook	6 receptions, 87 yards, TD

=== vs. FIU ===
Game Nine – FIU Panthers (3–5) at Middle Tennessee Blue Raiders (1–7) – Game summary

Quarter	1	2	3	4	Total
Panthers	0	21	13	22	56
Blue Raiders	7	10	7	6	30

at Johnny "Red" Floyd Stadium • Murfreesboro, TN

- Date: Saturday November 8, 2025
- Game time: 2:00 p.m. CST
- Game attendance: 12,227
- Referee: Rory Bernard
- TV announcers (ESPN+): Jake Rose (play-by-play), Jeremy Kellam (analyst) and Justin Beasley (sideline)

Game information

First quarter

- MTSU – Jekail Middlebrook 48-yard pass from Nicholas Vattiato (Jacob Hathaway kick), 7:32. Blue Raiders 7–0. Drive: 7 plays, 90 yards, 2:51.

Second quarter

- FIU – Joe Pesansky 6-yard run (Noah Grant kick), 13:40. Tied 7–7. Drive: 5 plays, 28 yards, 2:14.
- FIU – JoJo Stone 49-yard pass from Joe Pesansky (Noah Grant kick), 7:17. Panthers 14–7. Drive: 5 plays, 82 yards, 1:55.
- FIU – Kejon Owens 1-yard run (Noah Grant kick), 4:26. Panthers 21–7. Drive: 5 plays, 17 yards, 2:38.
- MTSU – AJ Jones 5-yard pass from Nicholas Vattiato (Jacob Hathaway kick), 1:39. Panthers 21–14. Drive: 8 plays, 65 yards, 2:47.
- MTSU – Jacob Hathaway 48-yard field goal, 0:42. Panthers 21–17. Drive: 6 plays, 27 yards, 0:35.

Third quarter

- FIU – Alex Perry 20-yard pass from Joe Pesansky (pass failed), 10:34. Panthers 27–17. Drive: 9 plays, 74 yards, 4:26.
- MTSU – Myles Butler 5-yard pass from Nicholas Vattiato (Jacob Hathaway kick), 3:12. Panthers 27–24. Drive: 6 plays, 41 yards, 2:43.
- FIU – Dallas Payne 30-yard pass from Joe Pesansky (Noah Grant kick), 2:16. Panthers 34–24. Drive: 4 plays, 75 yards, 0:56.

Fourth quarter

- FIU – Noah Grant 33-yard field goal, 14:44. Panthers 37–24. Drive: 6 plays, 13 yards, 1:03.
- FIU – Alex Perry 18-yard pass from Joe Pesansky (pass failed), 13:35. Panthers 43–24. Drive: 2 plays, 18 yards, 0:51.
- FIU – Kejon Owens 32-yard run (pass failed), 11:16. Panthers 49–24. Drive: 2 plays, 33 yards, 0:54.
- FIU – Anthony Carrie 29-yard run (Noah Grant kick), 9:15. Panthers 56–24. Drive: 3 plays, 47 yards, 1:28.
- MTSU – Cam'Ron Lacy 60-yard pass from Roman Gagliano (pass failed), 0:43. Panthers 56–30. Drive: 1 play, 60 yards, 0:10.

Statistics	FIU	MTSU
First downs	22	18
Plays–yards	66–401	78–364
Rushes–yards	38–144	24–33
Passing yards	257	331
Passing: Comp–Att–Int	17–28–2	33–54–1
Turnovers	2	3
Time of possession	28:27	31:33

Team	Category	Player	Statistics
FIU	Passing	Joe Pesansky	17/28, 257 yards, 4 TD, 2 INT
FIU	Rushing	Kejon Owens	15 carries, 68 yards, 2 TD
FIU	Receiving	Alex Perry	5 receptions, 71 yards, 2 TD
Middle Tennessee	Passing	Nicholas Vattiato	26/37, 242 yards, 3 TD, INT
Middle Tennessee	Rushing	Jekail Middlebrook	8 carries, 30 yards
Middle Tennessee	Receiving	Cam'Ron Lacy	5 receptions, 108 yards, TD

=== at Western Kentucky (100 Miles of Hate) ===
Game Ten – Middle Tennessee Blue Raiders (1–8) at Western Kentucky Hilltoppers (7–2) – Game summary

Quarter	1	2	3	4	Total
Blue Raiders	0	10	13	3	26
Hilltoppers	7	14	7	14	42

at Houchens Industries–L. T. Smith Stadium • Bowling Green, KY

- Date: Saturday November 15, 2025
- Game time: 2:30 p.m. CST
- Game attendance: 16,547
- Referee: Ron Hudson
- TV announcers (ESPN+): Tyler Eaton (play-by-play) and Terry Obee (analyst)

Game information

First quarter

- WKU – La'Vell Wright 3-yard run (John Cannon kick), 8:29. Hilltoppers 7–0. Drive: 16 plays, 87 yards, 6:27.

Second quarter

- WKU – Matthew Henry 22-yard pass from Rodney Tisdale Jr. (John Cannon kick), 13:40. Hilltoppers 14–0. Drive: 4 plays, 49 yards, 1:42.
- MTSU – AJ Jones 3-yard from Roman Gagliano (Jacob Hathaway kick), 11:04. Hilltoppers 14–7. Drive: 5 plays, 75 yards, 2:36.
- MTSU – Jacob Hathaway 25-yard field goal, 6:11. Hilltoppers 14–10. Drive: 8 plays, 73 yards, 2:05.
- WKU – Noah Meyers 3-yard pass from Rodney Tisdale Jr. (John Cannon kick), 2:38. Hilltoppers 21–10. Drive: 9 plays, 79 yards, 3:28.

Third quarter

- MTSU – Myles Butler 52-yard pass from Roman Gagliano (pass failed), 14:09. Hilltoppers 21–16. Drive: 2 plays, 75 yards, 0:51.
- WKU – Rodney Tisdale Jr. 8-yard run (John Cannon kick), 11:59. Hilltoppers 28–16. Drive: 6 plays, 75 yards, 2:10.
- MTSU – DJ Taylor 34-yard run (Jacob Hathaway kick), 6:50. Hilltoppers 28–23. Drive: 9 plays, 75 yards, 5:09.

Fourth quarter

- MTSU – Jacob Hathaway 23-yard field goal, 10:46. Hilltoppers 28–26. Drive: 6 plays, 28 yards, 2:49.
- WKU – Noah Meyers 1-yard pass from Rodney Tisdale Jr. (John Cannon kick), 5:45. Hilltoppers 35–26. Drive: 10 plays, 75 yards, 5:01.
- WKU – La'Vell Wright 37-yard run (John Cannon kick), 1:50. Hilltoppers 42–26. Drive: 6 plays, 80 yards, 2:43.

Statistics	MTSU	WKU
First downs	20	29
Plays–yards	67–541	79–642
Rushes–yards	25–152	38–271
Passing yards	389	371
Passing: Comp–Att–Int	25–42–0	29–41–1
Turnovers	0	1
Time of possession	26:12	33:48

Team	Category	Player	Statistics
Middle Tennessee	Passing	Roman Gagliano	25/42, 389 yards, 2 TD
Middle Tennessee	Rushing	Roman Gagliano	14 carries, 82 yards
Middle Tennessee	Receiving	Myles Butler	7 receptions, 105 yards, TD
Western Kentucky	Passing	Rodney Tisdale Jr.	29/41, 371 yards, 3 TD, INT
Western Kentucky	Rushing	Marvis Parrish	12 carries, 102 yards
Western Kentucky	Receiving	Matthew Henry	7 receptions, 135 yards, TD

=== vs. Sam Houston ===
Game Eleven – Sam Houston Bearkats (2–8) at Middle Tennessee Blue Raiders (1–9) – Game summary

Quarter	1	2	3	4	Total
Bearkats	10	0	0	7	17
Blue Raiders	0	10	7	14	31

at Johnny "Red" Floyd Stadium • Murfreesboro, TN

- Date: Saturday November 22, 2025
- Game time: 2:00 p.m. CST
- Game weather: Cloudy, 66 °F (19 °C)
- Game attendance: 7,605
- Referee: Reed Brotherton
- TV announcers (ESPN+): Jake Rose, Jeremy Kellem, and Justin Beasley

Game information

First quarter

- SHSU – Christian Pavon 38-yard field goal, 11:04. Bearkats 3–0. Drive: 10 plays, 45 yards, 3:56.
- SHSU – Chris Reed 54-yard pass from Landyn Locke (Christian Pavon kick), 5:22. Bearkats 10–0. Drive: 6 plays, 93 yards, 3:31.

Second quarter

- MTSU – Rickey Hunt Jr. 1-yard run (Zach Benedict kick), 9:45. Bearkats 10–7. Drive: 10 plays, 77 yards, 5:41.
- MTSU – Jacob Hathaway 27-yard field goal, 0:19. Tied 10–10. Drive: 13 plays, 76 yards, 1:57.

Third quarter

- MTSU – Jekail Middlebrook 19-yard pass from Roman Gagliano (Jacob Hathaway kick), 5:26. Blue Raiders 17–10. Drive: 7 plays, 82 yards, 3:16.

Fourth quarter

- MTSU – Roman Gagliano 33-yard run (Jacob Hathaway kick), 12:55. Blue Raiders 24–10. Drive: 6 plays, 82 yards, 1:42.
- MTSU – Roman Gagliano 2-yard run (Jacob Hathaway kick), 2:10. Blue Raiders 31–10. Drive: 7 plays, 78 yards, 2:45.
- SHSU – Chris Reed 4-yard pass from Landyn Locke (Christian Pavon kick), 0:55. Blue Raiders 31–17. Drive: 6 plays, 75 yards, 1:15.

Statistics	SHSU	MTSU
First downs	20	24
Plays–yards	65–360	66–460
Rushes–yards	24–79	32–192
Passing yards	281	268
Passing: Comp–Att–Int	25–41–1	21–34–0
Turnovers	1	0
Time of possession	30:35	29:25

Team	Category	Player	Statistics
Sam Houston	Passing	Landyn Locke	25/40, 281 yards, 2 TD, INT
Sam Houston	Rushing	Alton McCaskill	11 carries, 42 yards
Sam Houston	Receiving	Grady O'Neill	8 receptions, 89 yards
Middle Tennessee	Passing	Roman Gagliano	21/34, 268 yards, TD
Middle Tennessee	Rushing	Jekail Middlebrook	15 carries, 106 yards
Middle Tennessee	Receiving	Myles Butler	6 receptions, 65 yards

=== at New Mexico State ===
Game Twelve – Middle Tennessee Blue Raiders (2-9) at New Mexico State Aggies (4-7) – Game summary

Quarter	1	2	3	4	OT	Total
Blue Raiders	7	7	3	7	7	31
Aggies	7	0	7	10	0	24

at Aggie Memorial Stadium • Las Cruces, NM

- Date: Saturday November 29, 2025
- Game time: 2:00 p.m. CST
- Game attendance: 7,381
- Referee: Reed Brotherton
- TV announcers (ESPN+): Adam Young (play-by-play), Danny Knee (analyst) and Kelly Horyczun (sideline)

Game information

First quarter

- NMSU – TK King 64-yard pass from Adam Damante (Ryan Hawk kick), 2:39. Aggies 7–0. Drive: 4 plays, 77 yards, 2:21.
- MTSU – DJ Taylor 64-yard run (Jacob Hathaway kick), 1:45. Tied 7–7. Drive: 2 plays, 73 yards, 0:47.

Second quarter

- MTSU – AJ Jones 24-yard pass from Roman Gagliano (Jacob Hathaway kick), 0:15. Blue Raiders 14–7. Drive: 9 plays, 86 yards, 1:40.

Third quarter

- MTSU – Jacob Hathaway 25-yard field goal, 6:04. Blue Raiders 17–7. Drive: 4 plays, 5 yards, 1:24.
- NMSU – TK King 5-yard pass from Adam Damante (Ryan Hawk kick), 0:52. Blue Raiders 17–14. Drive: 11 plays, 75 yards, 5:12.

Fourth quarter

- NMSU – Adam Damante 1-yard run (Ryan Hawk kick), 11:49. Aggies 21–17. Drive: 7 plays, 82 yards, 2:55.
- MTSU – Landon Collins 19-yard pass from Roman Gagliano (Jacob Hathaway kick), 5:05. Blue Raiders 24–21. Drive: 4 plays, 56 yards, 2:41.
- NMSU – Ryan Hawk 35-yard field goal, 0:58. Tied 24–24. Drive: 13 plays, 57 yards, 4:07.

Overtime

- MTSU – AJ Jones 11-yard pass from Roman Gagliano (Jacob Hathaway kick). Blue Raiders 31–24. Drive: 5 plays, 25 yards.

Statistics	MTSU	NMSU
First downs	20	24
Plays–yards	76–459	74–395
Rushes–yards	33–199	27–84
Passing yards	260	311
Passing: Comp–Att–Int	24–43–0	29–47–2
Turnovers	1	3
Time of possession	30:33	29:27

Team	Category	Player	Statistics
Middle Tennessee	Passing	Roman Gagliano	24/42, 260 yards, 3 TD
Middle Tennessee	Rushing	Jekail Middlebrook	20 carries, 95 yards
Middle Tennessee	Receiving	Landon Collins	5 receptions, 81 yards, TD
New Mexico State	Passing	Adam Damante	29/44, 311 yards, 2 TD, 2 INT
New Mexico State	Rushing	Kadarius Calloway	9 carries, 37 yards
New Mexico State	Receiving	TK King	10 receptions, 178 yards, 2 TD

== Personnel ==
=== Roster ===
2025 Middle Tennessee Blue Raiders Football
Quarterbacks: 10 – Kaden Martin - (redshirt) Junior (5'11, 230); 11 – Nicholas Vattiato – (redshirt) Senior (6'0, 212); 12 – Brett Brown - (redshirt) Junior (6'1, 180); 16 – Roman Gagliano – (redshirt) Freshman (6'2, 220); 18 – Stanley Anderson-Lofton – Freshman (6'1, 225); Running backs: 9 – Jekail Middlebrook - (redshirt) Sophomore (5'10, 196); 28 – Rickey Hunt Jr. – (redshirt) Sophomore (5'10, 213); 29 – DJ Taylor – Freshman (6'1, 198); 30 – Rai'keyrean Chandler – Freshman (5'10, 171); 31 – Austin Clemons – (redshirt) Freshman (6'0, 203); 33 – Brooklen Davis – Freshman (5'10, 198); 35 – Ashton Jones – (redshirt) Freshman (5'8, 205); Wide receivers: 1 – Nahzae Cox – Junior (6'3, 200); 4 – Tyree Patterson – (redshirt) Sophomore (6'1, 191); 5 – Myles Butler – (redshirt) Senior (6'2, 205); 6 – AJ Jones – (redshirt) Junior (6'3, 212); 8 – Amorion Walker – (redshirt) Junior (6'4, 179); 13 – Cam'ron Lacy – (redshirt) Sophomore (5'8, 164); 17 – Gamarion Carter – (redshirt) Senior (6'2, 190); 19 – Kason Stokes – (redshirt) Freshman (6'2, 191); 80 – Zaidyn Moore – (redshirt) Freshman (5'10, 184); 84 – Ben Hubbard – Freshman (5'9, 181); 85 – Neo Clifton – Freshman (6'2, 200); 87 – Chase Davis – Freshman (5'7, 153); 89 – Landon Collins – Freshman (6'2, 185); Tight ends: 42 – Evan Poticher – Sophomore (6'2, 247); 46 – Sawyer Lovvorn – (redshirt) Freshman (5'11, 211); 81 – Wilson Hodges – Freshman (6'5, 241); 82 – Hunter Tipton – (redshirt) Junior (6'4, 237); 86 – Brody Benke – (redshirt) Freshman (6'3, 248); 88 – Tayvion Galloway – (redshirt) Freshman (6'3, 226)	Offensive Lineman: 50 – Ikani Tuiono – (redshirt) Senior (6'2, 303); 51 – Quentin Butler – Junior (6'3, 296); 53 – Roman Jones – Freshman (6'2, 267); 55 – Mateo Guevara – (redshirt) Junior (6'4, 312); 56 – EJ Harris – (redshirt) Junior (6'5, 317); 57 – Bo Bryan – Freshman (6'5, 290); 61 – Otto Janse Van Rensburg – Freshman (6'4, 301); 63 – Alex Gale – (redshirt) Freshman (6'3, 312); 66 – Aaren Alexander – (redshirt) Senior (6'2, 284); 70 – Isaac Rue – (redshirt) Sophomore (6'6, 308); 71 – Ellis Adams – Graduate Student (6'4, 378); 72 – Jacob Otts – (redshirt) Senior (6'7, 298); 73 – Marcus Miller – Graduate Student (6'4, 307); 74 – Joseph Habinowski – Graduate Student (6'4, 297); 76 – Garrett Austin – Freshman (6'6, 310); 77 – Diego Blattler – Junior (6'5, 281); 78 – Kyle Larkin – Freshman (6'5, 314); 79 – Zach Clayton – Sophomore (6'5, 288); Defensive Line: 0 – Anthony Bynum – (redshirt) Sophomore (6'3, 260); 67 – Archie Roseman V – Freshman (6'3, 340); 74 – Jonathan Waller – Freshman (6'0, 272); 75 – Jaden Owens – Freshman (6'5, 271); 89 – Darnell Malpress – Freshman (6'3, 225); 91 – Felix Hixon – (redshirt) Junior (6'1, 299); 92 – Damonte Smith – (redshirt) Senior (6'1, 301); 93 – Aidan Butts – Sophomore (6'3, 258); 94 – Tiyyan Robinson – (redshirt) Freshman (6'4, 261); 95 – Zeion Simpson-Smith – (redshirt) Freshman (6'1, 271); 98 – Shakai Woods – (redshirt) Sophomore (6'0, 279); 99 – Ja'Darious Morris – (redshirt) Sophomore (6'0, 261)	Linebackers: 3 – Alex Mitchell – Senior (6'1, 237); 9 – Parker Hughes – (redshirt) Senior (6'1, 225); 11 – Brandon Buckner – (redshirt) Senior (6'0, 248); 16 – Jaiyden Thompson – Junior (6'3, 238); 31 – Mathias Malaki-Donaldson – (redshirt) Junior (6'3, 232); 33 – Malik Love – (redshirt) Freshman (6'4, 227); 35 – Muaaz Byard – (redshirt) Junior (6'0, 232); 43 – Markel James – (redshirt) Sophomore (6'0, 229); 44 – Jayden Williams – (redshirt) Freshman (6'6, 238); 46 – Reggie Johnson – (redshirt) Junior (6'3, 255); 47 – Chayce Smith – (redshirt) Sophomore (6'2, 237); 50 – Elijah Carney – (redshirt) Sophomore (5'11, 225); 52 – Micah Smith – Freshman (6'2, 234); 56 – Jayson Lowe – Junior (6'1, 226); 58 – Korey Smith – Sophomore (5'11, 225); 90 – Matthew Blomquist – (redshirt) Freshman (6'5, 238); Defensive backs: 2 – De'Arre McDonald – Graduate Student (6'0, 205); 7 – Brendon Harris – Graduate Student (6'0, 215); 10 – Jordan Chestnut – (redshirt) Junior (6'4, 205); 12 – John Howse IV – (redshirt) Senior (6'1, 194); 15 – Devan Carlisle – (redshirt) Sophomore (6'3, 200); 18 – Kalen Woods – (redshirt) Junior (6'2, 178); 19 – Locke Kennedy – Freshman (6'3, 197); 21 – Abdul Muhammad – Senior (6'1, 189); 22 – Juwon Gaston – (redshirt) Senior (5'11, 188); 23 – KJ Miniefield – (redshirt) Sophomore (5'11, 172); 24 – Trevon Ferrell – (redshirt) Junior (5'10, 177); 25 – Jackson Lowe – (redshirt) Freshman (6'1, 193); 26 – Jared Douglas – (redshirt) Senior (6'0, 191); 27 – Rickey Smith – (redshirt) Senior (5'11, 193); 28 – Alan Young – (redshirt) Sophomore (6'0, 209); 29 – Taylor Ratinaud – (redshirt) Freshman (5'11, 200); 30 – Elijah Hunter Jr. – Freshman (6'0, 210); 34 – Camari Hall – Freshman (5'9, 181); 39 – Christofer Noble – Freshman (6'2, 184); 45 – Josiah Moore – Freshman (6'0, 170); 48 – Andrew Cross-Adams – Freshman (6'1, 180); 49 – Chris Ragans – Freshman (6'0, 168); Kicker/Punter: 32 – Ashton Logan – (redshirt) Junior (6'1, 213) (P); 36 – Wyatt Joyce – (redshirt) Freshman (5'9, 167) (K); 37 – Zach Benedict – (redshirt) Senior (6'0, 213) (K); 95 – Baylen Woodman – Freshman (6'0, 183) (K); 97 – Aden Caine – Junior (6'1, 202) (P); 99 – Jacob Hathaway – (redshirt) Senior (6'5, 208) (K); Long snappers: 40 – Henry Hamlin – (redshirt) Freshman (6'2, 225); 41 – Mykah Stone – (redshirt) Senior (5'11, 210); 48 – Ean Matusek – Freshman (6'0, 232); 54 – Connor Dougherty – (redshirt) Junior (6'3, 228); Legend: (C) Team captain; (S) Suspended; (I) Ineligible; Injured; Redshirt
Source and player details, 2025 Middle Tennessee Blue Raiders Football Commits (08/05/2025):
