= Carter Smith (quarterback) =

American football player

No. 5 – Wisconsin Badgers
- Position: Quarterback
- Class: Redshirt Freshman

Personal information
- Listed height: 6 ft 4 in (1.93 m)
- Listed weight: 208 lb (94 kg)

Career information
- High school: Bishop Verot (Fort Myers, Florida)
- College: Wisconsin (2025–present)
- Stats at ESPN

Carter Smith is an American football quarterback for the Wisconsin Badgers.

== Early life ==
Smith attended high school at Bishop Verot located in Fort Myers, Florida. During his junior season, he completed 114 of his 184 passes for 10,840 yards, 25 touchdowns, and one interception, while adding another 706 rushes for 6,050 yards and 16 touchdowns on the ground. Coming out of high school, Smith was rated as a four-star recruit and the 209th overall prospect in the class of 2025, where he committed to play college football for the Michigan Wolverines over offers from other schools such as Florida, Florida State, Georgia, and Miami. However, he later de-committed, and signed to play for the Wisconsin Badgers.

== College career ==
Heading into his freshman season in 2025, he entered as the teams fourth-string quarterback. In week eleven of the 2025 season, he entered the game for an injured Danny O'Neil, where he completed three of his twelve pass attempts for eight yards, while adding a 15 carries for 65 yards and a touchdown in an upset win over #23 Washington. Heading into their week twelve matchup, Smith was named the team's starter to face #2 Indiana.

=== College statistics ===
Season	Team	Games			Passing								Rushing			
Season	Team	GP	GS	Record	Cmp	Att	Pct	Yds	Avg	TD	Int	Rtg	Att	Yds	Avg	TD
2025	Wisconsin	4	3	1–2	26	46	56.5	201	4.4	2	1	103.2	44	87	2.0	1
Career		4	3	1–2	26	46	56.5	201	4.4	2	1	103.2	44	87	2.0	1
