= Tackett Curtis =

American football player

No. 24 – UCF Knights
- Position: Linebacker
- Class: Senior

Personal information
- Born: Many, Louisiana, U.S.
- Listed height: 6 ft 2 in (1.88 m)
- Listed weight: 230 lb (104 kg)

Career information
- High school: Many
- College: USC (2023); Wisconsin (2024–2025); UCF (2026–present)

Awards and highlights
- Louisiana Mr. Football (2022)
- Stats at ESPN

Tackett Curtis is an American college football linebacker who plays for the UCF Knights. He previously played for the USC Trojans and the Wisconsin Badgers.

== Early life ==
Curtis attended Many High School in Louisiana where he was a two-way player and was highly recruited, receiving offers to play college football as a freshman. He totaled 92 tackles and four interceptions on defense as a sophomore and helped Many win the state championship while being named the Class 2A Most Outstanding Defensive Player, The Times Defensive Player of the Year, All-District, All-State, and the defensive most valuable player of the latter two.

The following year, Curtis had 128 tackles, 18 tackles-for-loss, four interceptions and three forced fumbles and was named All-District and the defensive MVP, All-State and defensive MVP, the Louisiana Football Report Co-Defensive Player of the Year and MaxPreps Small School All-American. As a senior, he helped Many win another state title while totaling 112 tackles, 16 tackles-for-loss, six sacks and three interceptions, additionally recording 1,115 rushing yards and 11 touchdowns. He was the first Many athlete to be named the LSWA Mr. Football and received many other additional honors, including: state championship MVP, MaxPreps Louisiana Player of the Year, All-District, district defensive MVP, first-team MaxPreps All-American and being a finalist for the Butkus Award for top linebacker in the U.S. Curtis was ranked a top-100 recruit nationally and committed to the USC Trojans.

== College career ==
=== USC Trojans ===
Curtis became a starter immediately as a true freshman at USC in 2023, being the first to start at his position as a true freshman for the school since 2015, and the second since 1978. He ultimately appeared in 12 games for the Trojans in the 2023 season and posted 40 tackles, four tackles-for-loss, two sacks and two fumble recoveries. He entered the NCAA transfer portal after the season.

=== Wisconsin Badgers ===
On January 9, 2024, Curtis committed to the Wisconsin Badgers.

Midway through the 2025 season, Curtis was benched in favor of a pair of freshmen linebackers Mason Posa and Cooper Catalano. Following the season, Curtis entered the transfer portal for a second time.

=== UCF ===
On January 6, 2026, Curtis committed to the UCF Knights. This reunites him with Alex Grinch, who was his defensive coordinator at USC in 2023 and at Wisconsin in 2024.
