= Mr. Football (Louisiana) =

Award in the United States

The Louisiana Mr. Football award is an honor given to the top high school football player in the state of Louisiana. Past winners have often proceeded to have successful college careers and play in the National Football League (NFL) and other professional football leagues.

== Award winners ==
Professional teams listed are teams known. N/A indicates player is not eligible to play in the NFL yet

Year	Player	High school	College	Professional team(s)
1995	Cecil Collins, RB	Leesville	LSU, McNeese State	Miami Dolphins
1996	Travis Minor, RB	Catholic	Florida State	Miami Dolphins, St. Louis Rams
1997	Adam McConathy, LB	West Monroe	LSU, Texas, Louisiana Tech	
1998	Bradie James, LB	West Monroe	LSU	Dallas Cowboys, Houston Texans
1999	Brock Berlin, QB	Evangel	Florida, Miami	Miami Dolphins, Dallas Cowboys, St. Louis Rams, Detroit Lions
2000	Byron Robertson, RB	St. Thomas Aquinas	None	
2001	Jason Miller, RB	Iota	McNeese State	
2002	Robert Lane, QB	Neville	Ole Miss	
2003	Chris Markey, RB	Jesuit	UCLA	Billings Outlaws (IFL), Zurich Renegades (Switzerland)
2004	Ryan Perrilloux, QB	East St. John	LSU, Jacksonville State	Hartford Colonials (UFL), New York Giants, Calgary Stampeders (CFL), New Orleans VooDoo (AFL), Aix-en-Provence Argonautes, (France)
2005	Charles Scott, RB	Jonesboro-Hodge	LSU	Philadelphia Eagles, Arizona Cardinals, New York Giants
2006	Joe McKnight, RB	John Curtis	USC	New York Jets, Kansas City Chiefs, Edmonton Eskimos (CFL), Saskatchewan Roughriders (CFL)
2007	Randall Mackey, QB	Bastrop	Ole Miss	
2008	Blake Matherne, QB	Belle Chasse	Nicholls State	
2009	Gavin Webster, QB	Lutcher	Southeastern Louisiana, Southern (Baseball)	
2010	Anthony Johnson, DL	O.P. Walker	LSU	Miami Dolphins, Washington Redskins, New England Patriots, New York Jets, Indianapolis Colts, Memphis Express (AAF), Calgary Stampeders (CFL), Los Angeles Wildcats (XFL), DC Defenders (XFL)
2011	Landon Collins, DB	Dutchtown	Alabama	New York Giants, Washington Redskins
2012	John Diarse, QB	Neville	LSU, TCU	Denver Broncos, San Antonio Commanders (AAF), Massachusetts Pirates (NAL)
2013	Leonard Fournette, RB	St. Augustine	LSU	Jacksonville Jaguars, Tampa Bay Buccaneers, Buffalo Bills
2014	Deshawn Capers-Smith, QB	Warren Easton	Texas A&M	
2015	Lindsey Scott Jr., QB	Zachary	LSU, E. Mississippi C.C., Missouri, Nicholls, Incarnate Word	Houston Roughnecks (XFL/UFL), Arlington Renegades (UFL)
2016	Keytaon Thompson, QB	Landry-Walker	Mississippi State, Virginia	Detroit Lions, Orlando Guardians (XFL), Winnipeg Blue Bombers (CFL)
2017	Pooka Williams Jr., RB	Hahnville	Kansas	Cincinnati Bengals, DC Defenders (XFL), St. Louis BattleHawks (XFL), San Antonio Brahmas (UFL)
2018	Derek Stingley Jr., DB	The Dunham School	LSU	Houston Texans
2019	Christian Westcott, QB	Lakeshore	Southeastern Louisiana	N/A
2020	Sage Ryan, S	Lafayette Christian Academy	LSU, Ole Miss	N/A
2021	Landry Lyddy, QB	Calvary Baptist	Louisiana Tech, UAB, Southern Miss	N/A
2022	Tackett Curtis, LB	Many	USC, Wisconsin, UCF	N/A
2023	Ju'Juan Johnson, QB	Lafayette Christian Academy	LSU	N/A
2024	Xavier Ford, RB	Leesville	Minnesota	N/A
2025	Elijah Haven, QB	The Dunham School	N/A	N/A
