= Roman Gagliano =

American football player (born 2006)

No. 16 – Middle Tennessee Blue Raiders
- Position: Quarterback
- Class: Junior

Personal information
- Born: April 1, 2006 (age 20); Gainesville, Florida
- Listed height: 6 ft 3 in (1.91 m)
- Listed weight: 235 lb (107 kg)

Career information
- High school: Opelika (Opelika, Alabama)
- College: Middle Tennesee (2024–present)
- Stats at ESPN

Roman Levy Gagliano (born April 1, 2006) is an American college football quarterback for the Middle Tennessee Blue Raiders.

== Early life ==
Gagliano was born in Gainesville, Florida, and attended Opelika High School in Opelika, Alabama. As a senior, he threw for 1,600 yards and 16 touchdowns. Gagliano committed to Middle Tennessee State University to play college football.

== College career ==
Gagliano made his collegiate debut in relief of Nicholas Vattiato against No. 6 Ole Miss, completing four of seven passes for 41 yards. Following an injury to Vattiato, Gagliano made his first career start against Western Kentucky in 2025, completing 25 passes for 389 yards and two touchdowns while rushing for an additional 82 yards in a loss. He earned his first career win as a starter the following week, throwing for 268 yards and accounting for three touchdowns in a 31–17 victory over Sam Houston. In the final game of the season, Gagliano threw the game-winning touchdown pass in overtime to lead Middle Tennessee to a 31–24 victory over New Mexico State. He finished the season with 1,011 passing yards and seven touchdowns, while adding 160 rushing yards and two touchdowns.

Gagliano entered the 2026 season as the Blue Raiders' starting quarterback.Against Delaware, he completed 22 passes for 291 yards and accounted for four touchdowns in a 33–30 victory. Gagliano was subsequently named Conference USA Offensive Player of the Week. Against Western Kentucky, he threw for 312 yards and four touchdowns to lead Middle Tennessee to a 51–42 victory, snapping the Hilltoppers' seven-game winning streak in the 100 Miles of Hate rivalry.

=== Statistics ===
College statistics
Season	Team	Games			Passing								Rushing			
Season	Team	GP	GS	Record	Cmp	Att	Pct	Yds	Avg	TD	Int	Rtg	Att	Yds	Avg	TD
2024	Middle Tennessee	3	0	–	4	9	44.4	41	4.6	0	0	82.7	2	5	2.5	0
2025	Middle Tennessee	5	3	2–1	78	135	57.8	1,005	7.4	7	0	137.4	39	166	4.3	2
2026	Middle Tennessee	9	9	5–4	177	299	59.2	1,899	6.4	16	4	127.5	51	197	3.9	3
Career		17	12	7–5	259	443	58.5	2,945	6.6	23	4	129.6	92	368	4.0	5

== Personal life ==
Gagliano is of American Samoan descent.
