= Sage Ryan =

American gridiron football player (born 2003)

No. 28 – Ottawa Redblacks
- Position: Defensive back
- Roster status: Active
- CFL status: American

Personal information
- Born: May 20, 2003 (age 23)
- Listed height: 5 ft 11 in (1.80 m)
- Listed weight: 204 lb (93 kg)

Career information
- High school: Lafayette Christian Academy (Lafayette, Louisiana)
- College: LSU (2021–2024); Ole Miss (2025)
- NFL draft: 2026: undrafted

Career history
- Ottawa Redblacks (2026–present)

Awards and highlights
- Louisiana Mr. Football (2020)

Career CFL statistics as of 2026
- Tackles: 20
- Sacks: 1
- Stats at CFL.ca

Sage Jaiden Ryan (born May 20, 2003) is an American professional football defensive back for the Ottawa Redblacks of the Canadian Football League (CFL). He played college football for the LSU Tigers and Ole Miss Rebels.

== Early life ==
Ryan was born on May 20, 2003. He attended Lafayette Christian Academy in Lafayette, Louisiana. As a senior, Ryan rushed for 576 yards and 13 touchdowns with 18 receptions for 297 yards and 3 scores. In addition, he returned three punts for touchdowns in 2020.

Ryan was rated as a five-star recruit by 247Sports and Rivals. 247Sports also ranked him as the second best safety in the county. On October 31, 2020, Ryan committed to play college football at Louisiana State University. On February 2, 2021, he was named Louisiana Mr. Football.

== College career ==
Ryan played college football for the LSU Tigers from 2021 to 2024 and Ole Miss Rebels in 2025. He played in 43 games at LSU, recording 113 tackles, including 6.5 for loss, one sack, one interception, 13 pass break ups, five forced fumbles and two fumble recoveries. On December 12, 2024, Ryan entered the transfer portal. On December 23, he committed to Ole Miss. In 15 games, Ryan registered 26 tackles, 0.5 sack and four pass defenses.

== Professional career ==
Pre-draft measurables
Height	Weight	Arm length	Hand span	Wingspan	40-yard dash	10-yard split	20-yard split	20-yard shuttle	Three-cone drill	Vertical jump	Broad jump
5 ft 11 in (1.80 m)	204 lb (93 kg)	30 3/8 in (0.77 m)	8 3/4 in (0.22 m)	6 ft 1 7/8 in (1.88 m)	4.59 s	1.58 s	2.58 s	4.59 s	7.20 s	32.5 in (0.83 m)	10 ft 3 in (3.12 m)
All values from Pro day

After going unselected in the 2026 NFL draft, Ryan signed with the Ottawa Redblacks of the Canadian Football League (CFL) as an undrafted free agent. On October 1, he was elevated to the active roster. Ryan played in the final four games of the season, logging 20 tackles and a sack.
