= Saint Michael the Archangel High School (Fredericksburg, Virginia) =

Catholic school in Virginia, United States

Location
- 6301 Campus Drive; Fredericksburg, VA; Fredericksburg, Virginia 22407; United States
- Coordinates: 38°17′43″N 77°33′16″W

Information
- Type: Private, Coeducational
- Religious affiliations: Roman Catholic, Diocese of Arlington Recognized Catholic School
- Patron saint: St. Michael the Archangel
- Opened: 2006
- Principal: Emily Brown
- Chaplain: Fr. Peter
- Grades: 9-12
- Gender: Co-ed
- Hours in school day: 8:00am-2:45pm
- Colors: Red Blue and White
- Athletics conference: Virginia Independent School Athletic Association
- Sports: Cross Country, Men's Soccer, Volleyball, Men's Basketball, Women's Basketball, Cheer, Swimming, Baseball, Women's Soccer, and Golf
- Mascot: St. Michael the Archangel
- Nickname: St. Mike's
- Team name: The Warriors
- Accreditation: Southern Association of Colleges and Schools
- Newspaper: The Sword
- Website: saintmichaelhs.org

Saint Michael the Archangel High School is an accredited, private, co-educational, Catholic high school located in Fredericksburg, Virginia, USA.

The school uses A-B day class schedule system and offers a wide range of honors and AP courses.

Saint Michael the Archangel High School takes pride in their religious belief. Every Wednesday, Father Peter hosts weekly Mass at the school gym. Each year, all school faculty and students participate in March for Life in Washington, D.C.

Each student must complete a minimum of 150 service hours in order to graduate from Saint Michael the Archangel High School in keeping with the Gospel teaching that Jesus came to serve not to be served. The school's official website clearly states that students will serve with an attitude of joy and charity as God loves a cheerful giver. Moreover, the school also assigns service hour requirements per grade level and gradually increases the hour requirements as students become more accustomed to the academic rigors of high school.
