= Lance Mason (American football) =

American football player (born 2003)

Profile
- Position: Tight end

Personal information
- Born: September 19, 2003 (age 23); Garland, Texas, U.S.
- Listed height: 6 ft 3 in (1.91 m)
- Listed weight: 243 lb (110 kg)

Career information
- High school: Rockwall-Heath (Heath, Texas)
- College: Missouri State (2022–2024); Wisconsin (2025)
- NFL draft: 2026: undrafted

Career history
- Seattle Seahawks (2026)*; Pittsburgh Steelers (2026)*
- * Offseason or practice squad member only

Awards and highlights
- Second-team All-Big Ten (2025); Second-team All-MVFC (2024)
- Stats at ESPN

Lance P. Mason (born September 19, 2003) is an American football tight end. He played college football for the Wisconsin Badgers.

== Early life ==
Mason attended Rockwall-Heath High School in Heath, Texas, and committed to play college football for the Missouri State Bears.

== College career ==
=== Missouri State ===
In three years at Missouri State from 2022 to 2024, Mason totaled 56 receptions for 800 yards and eight touchdowns, earning an honorable mention All-American nod from the Associated Press in 2024. After the 2024 season, Mason entered the NCAA transfer portal.

=== Wisconsin ===
Mason transferred to play for the Wisconsin Badgers. In week 2 of the 2025 season, he hauled in seven passes for 102 yards and a touchdown in a win over Middle Tennessee. In week 3, Mason brought in two passes for 30 yards in a loss to Alabama. In week 4, he totaled five receptions for 45 yards and a touchdown against Maryland. Mason finished the 2025 season with 30 receptions for 398 yards and four touchdowns, earning second-team all-Big Ten honors.

== Professional career ==
Pre-draft measurables
Height	Weight	Arm length	Hand span	Wingspan	40-yard dash	10-yard split	20-yard split	20-yard shuttle	Three-cone drill	Vertical jump	Broad jump	Bench press
6 ft 3 in (1.91 m)	243 lb (110 kg)	31 3/8 in (0.80 m)	10 in (0.25 m)	6 ft 4 1/4 in (1.94 m)	4.71 s	1.67 s	2.64 s	4.36 s	7.45 s	32.5 in (0.83 m)	9 ft 3 in (2.82 m)	22 reps
All values from Pro Day

=== Seattle Seahawks ===
Mason was signed by the Seattle Seahawks after going undrafted in the 2026 NFL draft. He was waived by the Seahawks on August 6.

=== Pittsburgh Steelers ===
On August 7, 2026, Mason was claimed off waivers by the Pittsburgh Steelers. He was waived by the Steelers as a part of final roster cuts on August 30.
