= Many High School =

High school in Louisiana, United States

Location
- 100 Tiger Drive; Many, (Sabine Parish), Louisiana 71449; United States; 31.5935°N 93.4503°W

Information
- Type: Public high school
- School district: Sabine Parish School Board
- Principal: Moses Curtis
- Staff: 27.00 (on an FTE basis)
- Enrollment: 368 (2023–2024)
- Student to teacher ratio: 13.63
- Colors: Red and black
- Mascot: Tiger
- Nickname: Tigers
- Website: www.sabine.school/o/mhs

Many High School is a high school in Many, Louisiana, United States. It is a part of the Sabine Parish School Board. Tigers are the school mascot and the school colors are red, white, and black.

== History ==
In the 1930s, the school was one of several in northwestern Louisiana that received gymnasiums funded by federal programs.

== Athletics ==
Many High athletics competes in the LHSAA.

=== Championships ===
Football championships

- (3) State Championships: 2014, 2020, 2022

== Notable alumni ==
- Tackett Curtis, college football linebacker (USC, Wisconsin)
