= Vinny Anthony =

American football player (born 2003)

Vinny Anthony II
No. 86 – Atlanta Falcons
- Position: Wide receiver
- Roster status: Practice squad

Personal information
- Born: June 27, 2003 (age 23)
- Listed height: 6 ft 0 in (1.83 m)
- Listed weight: 183 lb (83 kg)

Career information
- High school: Louisville Male (Louisville, Kentucky)
- College: Wisconsin (2022–2025)
- NFL draft: 2026: undrafted

Career history
- Atlanta Falcons (2026–present)*
- * Offseason or practice squad member only
- Stats at Pro Football Reference

Vincel Anthony II (born June 27, 2003) is an American professional football wide receiver for the Atlanta Falcons of the National Football League (NFL). He played college football for the Wisconsin Badgers and he was signed as an undrafted free agent by the Falcons in 2026.

== Early life ==
Anthony II attended Louisville Male High School in Louisville, Kentucky, and committed to play college football for the Wisconsin Badgers over offers from other schools such as Cincinnati and Duke.

== College career ==
As a freshman in 2022, Anthony II played in ten games, rushing three times for 14 yards. In week 12 of the 2023 season, he hauled in three passes for 47 yards in a loss to Northwestern. Anthony II finished the 2023 season with ten catches for 99 yards. In week 4 of the 2024 season, he hauled in a 63-yard touchdown pass and returned a kickoff 74 yards against USC. Anthony II finished the 2024 season with 39 receptions for 672 yards and four touchdowns. In week 3 of the 2025 season, he returned a kickoff 95 yards for a touchdown in a loss to Alabama. Anthony II finished the 2025 season with 31 receptions for 391 yards and a touchdown, while also adding 27 yards and two touchdowns on the ground. After the conclusion of the season, he accepted an invite to participate in the 2026 Senior Bowl.

== Professional career ==
Pre-draft measurables
Height	Weight	Arm length	Hand span	Wingspan	40-yard dash	10-yard split	20-yard split	20-yard shuttle	Three-cone drill	Vertical jump	Broad jump	Bench press
5 ft 11 7/8 in (1.83 m)	183 lb (83 kg)	31 1/8 in (0.79 m)	9 1/8 in (0.23 m)	6 ft 3 3/4 in (1.92 m)	4.54 s	1.59 s	2.56 s	4.07 s	6.68 s	37.0 in (0.94 m)	9 ft 7 in (2.92 m)	15 reps
All values from NFL Combine/Pro Day

Anthony was signed as an undrafted free agent by the Atlanta Falcons after the conclusion of the 2026 NFL draft. On August 30, 2026, Anthony was waived by the Falcons as a part of final roster cuts; he was re-signed to the team's practice squad the next day.
