= Dilin Jones =

American football player

No. 13 – LSU Tigers
- Position: Running back
- Class: Redshirt Sophomore

Personal information
- Listed height: 5 ft 11 in (1.80 m)
- Listed weight: 211 lb (96 kg)

Career information
- High school: Our Lady of Good Counsel (Olney, Maryland)
- College: Wisconsin (2024–2025); LSU (2026–present)
- Stats at ESPN

Dilin Jones is an American college football running back for the LSU Tigers. He previously played for the Wisconsin Badgers.

== Early life ==
Jones attended Our Lady of Good Counsel High School in Olney, Maryland. As a senior, he rushed for 820 yards on 100 carries with 12 with touchdowns. He committed to the University of Wisconsin to play college football.

== College career ==
=== Wisconsin ===
In his first year at Wisconsin in 2024, Jones played in three games, rushing 16 times for 88 yards and reshirted. He entered his redshirt freshman year in 2025 as the team's starting running back.

Following the 2025 season, Jones entered the transfer portal.

=== LSU ===
On January 13, 2026, Jones announced that he would transfer to LSU. When Jones got to LSU he emerged as the starting running back under coach Lane Kiffin.
