= Mason Posa =

American football player

No. 8 – Wisconsin Badgers
- Position: Linebacker
- Class: Freshman

Personal information
- Listed height: 6 ft 3 in (1.91 m)
- Listed weight: 231 lb (105 kg)

Career information
- High school: La Cueva (Albuquerque, New Mexico)
- College: Wisconsin (2025–present)

Awards and highlights
- Third-team All-Big Ten (2025)
- Stats at ESPN

Mason Posa is an American college football linebacker for the Wisconsin Badgers.

== Early life ==
Posa attended La Cueva High School in Albuquerque, New Mexico. As a senior, he had 133 tackles, nine sacks, two interceptions with three defensive touchdowns and was named the Albuquerque Journal Metro Male Athlete of the Year. Posa was selected to play in the 2025 All-American Bowl. He committed to the University of Wisconsin to play college football. Posa was also a four-time New Mexico State Champion wrestler in high school and went 130–3 during his career.

== College career ==
As a true freshman at Wisconsin in 2025, Posa started the first six games he played in as a backup before starting his first career game against the Oregon Ducks, recording 13 tackles. The next game against the Washington Huskies, he recorded 11 tackles and 2.5 sacks.
