= Danny O'Neil (American football) =

American football player

No. 18 – Wisconsin Badgers
- Position: Quarterback
- Class: Junior

Personal information
- Listed height: 6 ft 0 in (1.83 m)
- Listed weight: 202 lb (92 kg)

Career information
- High school: Cathedral (Indianapolis, Indiana)
- College: San Diego State (2024); Wisconsin (2025–present)
- Stats at ESPN

Danny O'Neil is an American college football quarterback for the Wisconsin Badgers. He previously played for the San Diego State Aztecs.

== Early life ==
O'Neil attended Cathedral High School in Indianapolis, Indiana, where, as a senior, he completed 61.8% of his passes for 2,068 yards and 31 touchdowns to ten interceptions and rushed for 722 yards and eight touchdowns. He finished his career with almost 8,000 passing yards and 99 touchdowns, while adding 1,300 yards and 31 touchdowns on the ground. Coming out of high school, O'Neil was rated as a three-star recruit and received offers from schools such as Colorado, Indiana, Louisville, Purdue, Northwestern, Syracuse, Wake Forest, and West Virginia. He initially committed to play college football for the Colorado Buffaloes. However shortly after the conclusion of Colorado's regular season finale, O'Neil de-committed from the Buffaloes. Ultimately, O'Neil committed to play for the San Diego State Aztecs.

== College career ==
=== San Diego State ===
In 2024, O'Neil became the first true freshman starting quarterback for the Aztecs in the Division I era. In week one, he completed 22 of 33 passes for 214 yards and two touchdowns in a victory against Texas A&M–Commerce. O'Neil sustained an injury the following week in a loss to Oregon State. After sitting out a week, he threw for 246 yards and two touchdowns in a loss to Central Michigan. In weeks 6 and 7, O'Neil led the Aztecs to back to back wins against Hawaii and Wyoming where he claimed Mountain West Freshman of the Week honors both weeks.

=== Wisconsin Badgers ===
On December 16, 2024, O'Neil transferred to Wisconsin. O'Neil started the season as a backup to Billy Edwards Jr. In the season opener against the Miami RedHawks, O'Neil replaced Edwards Jr. due to injury and completed 12 of 19 passes for 120 yards with one touchdown and interception in the victory. He also ran for another score. The following week against Middle Tennessee, he completed 23 of 27 passes for 283 yards and three touchdowns to one interception in the victory. In week 3 against Alabama, O'Neil completed just 11 of 17 passes for 117 yards and one touchdown to two interceptions in the loss. Edwards Jr. returned to start the following week against Maryland, but was replaced once again by O'Neil due to reaggravating the same knee injury. In the second half, O'Neil was replaced by Hunter Simmons due to inefficiency. O'Neil played limited snaps in two of the next four weeks off of the bench. In those four weeks, Wisconsin scored a combined 17 points and were winless. In week 9, O'Neil was named the Badgers starting quarterback against Washington. In the first half, O'Neil sustained a lower body injury after a 21-yard keeper and was carted off into the locker room.

=== Statistics ===
Season	Team	Games			Passing								Rushing			
Season	Team	GP	GS	Record	Cmp	Att	Pct	Yds	Y/A	TD	Int	Rtg	Att	Yds	Avg	TD
2024	San Diego State	11	11	3–8	209	330	63.3	2,181	6.6	12	6	127.2	73	93	1.3	1
2025	Wisconsin	7	3	2–1	61	90	67.8	635	7.1	5	5	134.3	50	58	1.2	1
Career		18	14	5–9	270	420	64.3	2,816	6.7	17	11	128.7	123	151	1.2	2
