= 2020 Minnesota Golden Gophers football team =

American college football season

2020 Minnesota Golden Gophers football
- Conference: Big Ten Conference
- West Division
- Record: 3–4 (3–4 Big Ten)
- Head coach: P. J. Fleck (4th season)
- Offensive coordinator: Mike Sanford Jr. (1st season)
- Co-offensive coordinator: Matt Simon (1st season)
- Offensive scheme: Spread option
- Defensive coordinator: Joe Rossi (3rd season)
- Co-defensive coordinator: Joe Harasymiak (1st season)
- Base defense: 4–3
- Home stadium: TCF Bank Stadium

Uniform
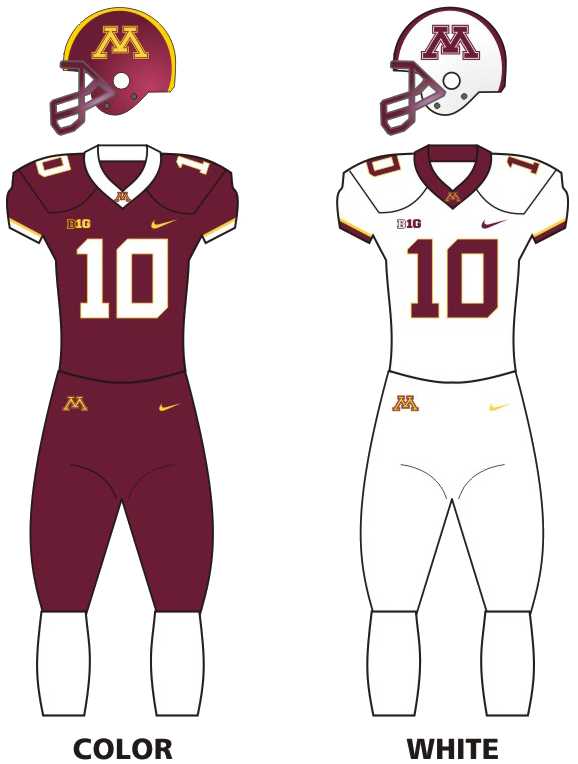

2020 Big Ten Conference football standings
| | Conf. | | | Overall |
| Team | W | | L | W | | L |
|---|---|---|---|---|---|---|
East Division
| No. 2 Ohio State xy$^ | 5 | – | 0 | 7 | – | 1 |
| No. 12 Indiana | 6 | – | 1 | 6 | – | 2 |
| Penn State | 4 | – | 5 | 4 | – | 5 |
| Maryland | 2 | – | 3 | 2 | – | 3 |
| Rutgers | 3 | – | 6 | 3 | – | 6 |
| Michigan | 2 | – | 4 | 2 | – | 4 |
| Michigan State | 2 | – | 5 | 2 | – | 5 |
West Division
| No. 10 Northwestern xy | 6 | – | 1 | 7 | – | 2 |
| No. 16 Iowa | 6 | – | 2 | 6 | – | 2 |
| Wisconsin | 3 | – | 3 | 4 | – | 3 |
| Minnesota | 3 | – | 4 | 3 | – | 4 |
| Nebraska | 3 | – | 5 | 3 | – | 5 |
| Purdue | 2 | – | 4 | 2 | – | 4 |
| Illinois | 2 | – | 6 | 2 | – | 6 |
Championship: Ohio State 22, Northwestern 10
^ – College Football Playoff participant; $ – Conference champion; x – Division champion/co-champions; y – Championship game participant; Note: Due to COVID-19, the Big Ten suspended the season on August 11, but later decided to begin play on October 24. In addition to the title game that was played on December 19, the conference seeded all remaining teams for "championship week" games.; Rankings from AP Poll.

The 2020 Minnesota Golden Gophers football team represented the University of Minnesota in the 2020 NCAA Division I FBS football season. The Golden Gophers played their home games at TCF Bank Stadium in Minneapolis, Minnesota, and competed in the West Division of the Big Ten Conference. They were led by fourth-year head coach P. J. Fleck.

On August 11, 2020, the Big Ten Conference canceled all fall sports competitions due to the COVID-19 pandemic. However, on September 16, the Big Ten reinstated the season, announcing an eight-game season beginning on October 24.

== Big Ten preseason poll ==
The Big Ten preseason media prediction poll was released on July 31, 2020. The Golden Gophers were predicted to finish second in the Big Ten West.

West
| Predicted finish | Team | Votes (1st place) |
|---|---|---|
| 1 | Wisconsin | 221 (19) |
| 2 | Minnesota | 209.5 (14) |
| 3 | Iowa | 157 |
| 4 | Nebraska | 117 |
| 5 | Purdue | 105 |
| 6 | Northwestern | 87.5 (1) |
| 7 | Illinois | 55 |

== Schedule ==
Minnesota had games scheduled against Florida Atlantic, Tennessee Tech, and BYU, but canceled these games on July 9 due to the Big Ten Conference's decision to play a conference-only schedule due to the COVID-19 pandemic.

| Date | Time | Opponent | Rank | Site | TV | Result | Attendance |
|---|---|---|---|---|---|---|---|
| October 24 | 6:30 p.m. | No. 18 Michigan | No. 21 | TCF Bank Stadium; Minneapolis, MN (College GameDay) | ABC | L 24–49 | 589 |
| October 30 | 6:30 p.m. | at Maryland | | Maryland Stadium; College Park, MD | ESPN | L 44–45 ^{OT} | 0 |
| November 7 | 2:30 p.m. | at Illinois | | Memorial Stadium; Champaign, IL | BTN | W 41–14 | 863 |
| November 13 | 6:00 p.m. | Iowa | | TCF Bank Stadium; Minneapolis, MN (Floyd of Rosedale) | FS1 | L 7–35 | 771 |
| November 20 | 6:30 p.m. | Purdue | | TCF Bank Stadium; Minneapolis, MN | BTN | W 34–31 | 593 |
| November 27 | | at Wisconsin | | Camp Randall Stadium; Madison, WI (Paul Bunyan's Axe) | | No Contest | |
| December 5 | 11:00 a.m. | Northwestern | | TCF Bank Stadium; Minneapolis, MN | BTN/FS1 | No Contest | |
| December 12 | 11:00 a.m. | at Nebraska | | Memorial Stadium; Lincoln, NE ($5 Bits of Broken Chair Trophy) | FS1 | W 24–17 | 0 |
| December 19 | 3:00 p.m. | at Wisconsin | | Camp Randall Stadium; Madison, WI (Paul Bunyan's Axe) | BTN | L 17–20 ^{OT} | 1 |
Rankings from AP Poll released prior to the game; All times are in Central time

== Rankings ==
Ranking movements Legend: ██ Increase in ranking ██ Decrease in ranking — = Not ranked RV = Received votes
| | Week | | | | | | | | | | | | | | | |
| Poll | Pre | 1 | 2 | 3 | 4 | 5 | 6 | 7 | 8 | 9 | 10 | 11 | 12 | 13 | 14 | Final |
|---|---|---|---|---|---|---|---|---|---|---|---|---|---|---|---|---|
| AP | 19 | 19* | — | — | RV | 25 | 24 | 21 | RV | — | — | — | — | — | — | — |
| Coaches | 18 | 18* | — | 22 | RV | RV | 25 | 21 | RV | — | — | — | — | — | — | — |
| CFP | Not released | | | | | | | | | | | | — | — | — | Not released |

== Game summaries ==
=== No. 18 Michigan ===
No. 18 Michigan Wolverines at No. 21 Minnesota Golden Gophers – Game summary

| Quarter | 1 | 2 | 3 | 4 | Total |
|---|---|---|---|---|---|
| No. 18 Wolverines | 21 | 14 | 7 | 7 | 49 |
| No. 21 Golden Gophers | 10 | 7 | 7 | 0 | 24 |

at TCF Bank Stadium, Minneapolis, Minnesota

- Date: October 24
- Game time: 6:30 p.m. CDT
- Game weather: Cloudy, 30 °F (−1 °C)
- Game attendance: 589
- Referee: Larry Smith
- TV announcers (ABC): Chris Fowler, Kirk Herbstreit, and Maria Taylor
- Box score, Recap

Game information
First quarter
- MINN – Ko Kieft 14-yard pass from Tanner Morgan (Brock Walker kick), 12:44. Golden Gophers 7–0. Drive: 2 plays, 17 yards, 0:42.
- MICH – Zach Charbonnet 70-yard run (Jake Moody kick), 12:33. Tied 7–7. Drive: 1 play, 70 yards, 0:11.
- MICH – Donovan Jeter 15-yard fumble return (Jake Moody kick), 7:08. Wolverines 14–7.
- MINN – Brock Walker 29-yard field goal, 0:37. Wolverines 14–10. Drive: 11 plays, 79 yards, 6:29.
- MICH – Ben Mason 8-yard pass from Joe Milton (Jake Moody kick), 0:15. Wolverines 21–10. Drive: 2 plays, 8 yards, 0:24.

Second quarter

- MINN – Mohamed Ibrahim 16-yard run (Brock Walker kick), 9:38. Wolverines 21–17. Drive: 10 plays, 75 yards, 5:37.
- MICH – Hassan Haskins 4-yard run (Jake Moody kick), 4:48. Wolverines 28–17. Drive: 10 plays, 77 yards, 4:50.
- MICH – Hassan Haskins 4-yard run (Jake Moody kick), 1:00. Wolverines 35–17. Drive: 4 plays, 29 yards, 2:13.

Third quarter

- MINN – Mohamed Ibrahim 5-yard run (Brock Walker kick), 9:36. Wolverines 35–24. Drive: 11 plays, 71 yards, 5:24.
- MICH – Joe Milton 2-yard run (Jake Moody kick), 5:20. Wolverines 42–24. Drive: 9 plays, 68 yards, 4:16.

Fourth quarter

- MICH – Chris Evans 5-yard run (Jake Moody kick), 13:51. Wolverines 49–24. Drive: 5 plays, 96 yards, 1:58.

| Statistics | MICH | MINN |
|---|---|---|
| First downs | 18 | 21 |
| Total yards | 481 | 326 |
| Rushing yards | 256 | 129 |
| Passing yards | 225 | 197 |
| Turnovers | 0 | 2 |
| Time of possession | 24:13 | 35:47 |

| Team | Category | Player | Statistics |
|---|---|---|---|
| Michigan | Passing | Joe Milton | 15/22, 225 yards, TD |
| Michigan | Rushing | Hassan Haskins | 6 rushes, 82 yards, 2 TD |
| Michigan | Receiving | Ronnie Bell | 4 receptions, 74 yards |
| Minnesota | Passing | Tanner Morgan | 18/31, 197 yards, TD, INT |
| Minnesota | Rushing | Mohamed Ibrahim | 26 rushes, 140 yards, 2 TD |
| Minnesota | Receiving | Rashod Bateman | 9 receptions, 101 yards |

=== At Maryland ===
Minnesota Golden Gophers at Maryland Terrapins – Game summary

| Quarter | 1 | 2 | 3 | 4 | OT | Total |
|---|---|---|---|---|---|---|
| Golden Gophers | 7 | 21 | 10 | 0 | 6 | 44 |
| Terrapins | 21 | 0 | 0 | 17 | 7 | 45 |

at Maryland Stadium, College Park, Maryland

- Date: October 30
- Game time: 6:30 p.m. CDT / 7:30 p.m. EDT
- Game weather: Mostly clear, 46 °F (8 °C)
- Game attendance: 0
- Referee: Mark Kluczynski
- TV announcers (ESPN): Jason Benetti, Andre Ware, and Quint Kessenich
- Box score, Recap

Game information
First quarter
- MD – Jake Funk 8-yard pass from Taulia Tagovailoa (Joseph Petrino kick), 10:07. Terrapins 7–0. Drive: 11 plays, 82 yards, 4:53.
- MD – Taulia Tagovailoa 39-yard run (Joseph Petrino kick), 6:48. Terrapins 14–0. Drive: 3 plays, 62 yards, 1:19.
- MINN – Mohamed Ibrahim 1-yard run (Brock Walker kick), 2:42. Terrapins 14–7. Drive: 8 plays, 81 yards, 4:06.
- MD – Jeshaun Jones 76-yard pass from Taulia Tagovailoa (Joseph Petrino kick), 2:24. Terrapins 21–7. Drive: 1 play, 76 yards, 0:18.

Second quarter

- MINN – Mohamed Ibrahim 2-yard run (Brock Walker kick), 12:06. Terrapins 21–14. Drive: 11 plays, 65 yards, 5:18.
- MINN – Mohamed Ibrahim 1-yard run (Brock Walker kick), 7:42. Tied 21–21. Drive: 4 plays, 29 yards, 1:54.
- MINN – Mohamed Ibrahim 1-yard run (Brock Walker kick), 2:46. Golden Gophers 28–21. Drive: 5 plays, 91 yards, 2:22.

Third quarter

- MINN – Chris Autumn-Bell 39-yard pass from Tanner Morgan (Brock Walker kick), 11:54. Golden Gophers 35–21. Drive: 6 plays, 87 yards, 3:06.
- MINN – Brock Walker 25-yard field goal, 2:03. Golden Gophers 38–21. Drive: 13 plays, 73 yards, 7:08.

Fourth quarter

- MD – Dontay Demus Jr. 15-yard pass from Taulia Tagovailoa (Joseph Petrino kick), 13:14. Golden Gophers 38–28. Drive: 8 plays, 75 yards, 3:49.
- MD – Joseph Petrino 51-yard field goal, 7:06. Golden Gophers 38–31. Drive: 9 plays, 33 yards, 3:51.
- MD – Jake Funk 19-yard run (Joseph Petrino kick), 3:38. Tied 38–38. Drive: 3 plays, 56 yards, 1:08.

Overtime

- MD – Taulia Tagovailoa 2-yard run (Joseph Petrino kick). Terrapins 45–38. Drive: 4 plays, 25 yards.
- MINN – Seth Green 2-yard run (kick failed). Terrapins 45–44. Drive: 4 plays, 25 yards.

| Statistics | MINN | MD |
|---|---|---|
| First downs | 24 | 28 |
| Total yards | 451 | 675 |
| Rushing yards | 262 | 281 |
| Passing yards | 189 | 394 |
| Turnovers | 0 | 2 |
| Time of possession | 33:12 | 26:48 |

| Team | Category | Player | Statistics |
|---|---|---|---|
| Minnesota | Passing | Tanner Morgan | 10/15, 189 yards, TD |
| Minnesota | Rushing | Mohamed Ibrahim | 41 rushes, 207 yards, 4 TD |
| Minnesota | Receiving | Chris Autumn-Bell | 4 receptions, 112 yards, TD |
| Maryland | Passing | Taulia Tagovailoa | 26/35, 394 yards, 3 TD, INT |
| Maryland | Rushing | Jake Funk | 21 rushes, 221 yards, TD |
| Maryland | Receiving | Jeshaun Jones | 3 receptions, 103 yards, TD |

=== At Illinois ===
Minnesota Golden Gophers at Illinois Fighting Illini – Game summary

| Quarter | 1 | 2 | 3 | 4 | Total |
|---|---|---|---|---|---|
| Golden Gophers | 7 | 21 | 7 | 6 | 41 |
| Fighting Illini | 0 | 7 | 0 | 7 | 14 |

at Memorial Stadium, Champaign, Illinois

- Date: November 7
- Game time: 2:30 p.m. CDT
- Game weather: Sunny, 72 °F (22 °C)
- Game attendance: 863
- Referee: Greg Blum
- TV announcers (BTN): Mark Followill, Anthony Herron, and Elise Menaker
- Box score, Recap

Game information
First quarter
- MINN – Treyson Potts 9-yard run (Michael Lantz kick), 3:29. Golden Gophers 7–0. Drive: 11 plays, 93 yards, 4:24.

Second quarter

- MINN – Rashod Bateman 5-yard pass from Tanner Morgan (Michael Lantz kick), 13:23. Golden Gophers 14–0. Drive: 6 plays, 61 yards, 1:58.
- MINN – Mohamed Ibrahim 1-yard run (Michael Lantz kick), 8:09. Golden Gophers 21–0. Drive: 8 plays, 77 yards, 4:08.
- ILL – Mike Epstein 1-yard run (Caleb Griffin kick), 5:32. Golden Gophers 21–7. Drive: 6 plays, 83 yards, 2:37.
- MINN – Mohamed Ibrahim 2-yard run (Michael Lantz kick), 0:24. Golden Gophers 28–7. Drive: 10 plays, 75 yards, 5:08.

Third quarter

- MINN – Mohamed Ibrahim 1-yard run (Michael Lantz kick), 0:21. Golden Gophers 35–7. Drive: 7 plays, 71 yards, 3:53.

Fourth quarter

- ILL – Josh Imatorbhebhe 52-yard pass from Coran Taylor (Caleb Griffin kick), 11:30. Golden Gophers 35–14. Drive: 3 plays, 79 yards, 0:54.
- MINN – Mohamed Ibrahim 4-yard run (kick failed), 8:27. Golden Gophers 41–14. Drive: 5 plays, 62 yards, 3:03.

| Statistics | MINN | ILL |
|---|---|---|
| First downs | 30 | 14 |
| Total yards | 541 | 287 |
| Rushing yards | 325 | 181 |
| Passing yards | 216 | 106 |
| Turnovers | 2 | 0 |
| Time of possession | 37:35 | 22:25 |

| Team | Category | Player | Statistics |
|---|---|---|---|
| Minnesota | Passing | Tanner Morgan | 17/27, 216 yards, TD, INT |
| Minnesota | Rushing | Mohamed Ibrahim | 30 rushes, 224 yards, 4 TD |
| Minnesota | Receiving | Rashod Bateman | 10 receptions, 139 yards, TD |
| Illinois | Passing | Coran Taylor | 6/17, 106 yards, TD |
| Illinois | Rushing | Mike Epstein | 11 rushes, 108 yards, TD |
| Illinois | Receiving | Josh Imatorbhebhe | 2 receptions, 60 yards, TD |

=== Iowa ===
Iowa Hawkeyes at Minnesota Golden Gophers – Game summary

| Quarter | 1 | 2 | 3 | 4 | Total |
|---|---|---|---|---|---|
| Hawkeyes | 7 | 7 | 0 | 21 | 35 |
| Golden Gophers | 0 | 0 | 0 | 7 | 7 |

at TCF Bank Stadium, Minneapolis, Minnesota

- Date: November 13
- Game time: 6:00 p.m. CST
- Game weather: Sunny, 33 °F (1 °C)
- Game attendance: 771
- Referee: Reggie Smith
- TV announcers (FS1): Aaron Goldsmith and Brady Quinn
- Box score, Recap

Game information
First quarter
- IOWA – Nico Ragaini 1-yard run (Keith Duncan kick), 5:42. Hawkeyes 7–0. Drive: 7 plays, 64 yards, 3:04.

Second quarter

- IOWA – Tyler Goodson 7-yard run (Keith Duncan kick), 8:31. Hawkeyes 14–0. Drive: 12 plays, 85 yards, 5:25.

Third quarter

- No scoring plays

Fourth quarter

- IOWA – Ihmir Smith-Marsette 8-yard pass from Spencer Petras (kick failed), 13:12. Hawkeyes 20–0. Drive: 5 plays, 79 yards, 2:37.
- IOWA – Tyler Goodson 1-yard run (Tyler Goodson run), 8:56. Hawkeyes 28–0. Drive: 3 plays, 36 yards, 1:01.
- IOWA – Mekhi Sargent 14-yard run (Keith Duncan kick), 6:37. Hawkeyes 35–0. Drive: 3 plays, 51 yards, 1:23.
- MINN – Rashod Bateman 4-yard pass from Tanner Morgan (Michael Lantz kick), 0:14. Hawkeyes 35–7. Drive: 15 plays, 75 yards, 6:23.

| Statistics | IOWA | MINN |
|---|---|---|
| First downs | 20 | 19 |
| Total yards | 346 | 312 |
| Rushing yards | 235 | 145 |
| Passing yards | 111 | 167 |
| Turnovers | 1 | 2 |
| Time of possession | 23:50 | 36:10 |

| Team | Category | Player | Statistics |
|---|---|---|---|
| Iowa | Passing | Spencer Petras | 9/18, 111 yards, TD, INT |
| Iowa | Rushing | Tyler Goodson | 20 rushes, 142 yards, 2 TD |
| Iowa | Receiving | Tyrone Tracy Jr. | 3 receptions, 36 yards |
| Minnesota | Passing | Tanner Morgan | 16/33, 167 yards, TD, 2 INT |
| Minnesota | Rushing | Mohamed Ibrahim | 33 rushes, 144 yards |
| Minnesota | Receiving | Rashod Bateman | 8 receptions, 111 yards, TD |

=== Purdue ===
Purdue Boilermakers at Minnesota Golden Gophers – Game summary

| Quarter | 1 | 2 | 3 | 4 | Total |
|---|---|---|---|---|---|
| Boilermakers | 7 | 3 | 14 | 7 | 31 |
| Golden Gophers | 14 | 7 | 7 | 6 | 34 |

at TCF Bank Stadium, Minneapolis, Minnesota

- Date: November 20
- Game time: 6:30 p.m. CST
- Game weather: Sunny, 34 °F (1 °C)
- Game attendance: 593
- Referee: Ron Snodgrass
- TV announcers (BTN): Cory Provus and Glen Mason
- Box score, Recap

Game information
First quarter
- MINN – Cam Wiley 6-yard run (Brock Walker kick), 10:52. Golden Gophers 7–0. Drive: 8 plays, 69 yards, 4:08.
- PUR – Rondale Moore 8-yard run (J. D. Dellinger kick), 5:37. Tied 7–7. Drive: 10 plays, 91 yards, 5:15.
- MINN – Mohamed Ibrahim 1-yard run (Brock Walker kick), 1:09. Golden Gophers 14–7. Drive: 11 plays, 93 yards, 4:28.

Second quarter

- PUR – J. D. Dellinger 32-yard field goal, 8:05. Golden Gophers 14–10. Drive: 9 plays, 56 yards, 4:20.
- MINN – Seth Green 3-yard run (Brock Walker kick), 2:12. Golden Gophers 21–10. Drive: 11 plays, 75 yards, 5:53.

Third quarter

- PUR – David Bell 47-yard pass from Jack Plummer (J. D. Dellinger kick), 12:54. Golden Gophers 21–17. Drive: 5 plays, 84 yards, 2:06.
- MINN – Mohamed Ibrahim 1-yard run (Brock Walker kick), 8:57. Golden Gophers 28–17. Drive: 9 plays, 75 yards, 3:57.
- PUR – David Bell 9-yard pass from Jack Plummer (J. D. Dellinger kick), 4:35. Golden Gophers 28–24. Drive: 9 plays, 75 yards, 4:22.

Fourth quarter

- MINN – Mohamed Ibrahim 5-yard run (kick failed), 14:15. Golden Gophers 34–24. Drive: 9 plays, 75 yards, 5:20.
- PUR – Payne Durham 6-yard pass from Jack Plummer (J. D. Dellinger kick), 8:31. Golden Gophers 34–31. Drive: 12 plays, 75 yards, 5:44.

| Statistics | PUR | MINN |
|---|---|---|
| First downs | 28 | 20 |
| Total yards | 492 | 394 |
| Rushing yards | 125 | 130 |
| Passing yards | 367 | 264 |
| Turnovers | 1 | 0 |
| Time of possession | 29:42 | 30:18 |

| Team | Category | Player | Statistics |
|---|---|---|---|
| Purdue | Passing | Jack Plummer | 35/42, 367 yards, 3 TD, INT |
| Purdue | Rushing | Zander Horvath | 10 rushes, 68 yards |
| Purdue | Receiving | Rondale Moore | 15 receptions, 116 yards |
| Minnesota | Passing | Tanner Morgan | 15/22, 264 yards |
| Minnesota | Rushing | Mohamed Ibrahim | 25 rushes, 102 yards, 3 TD |
| Minnesota | Receiving | Chris Autumn-Bell | 5 receptions, 129 yards |

=== At Nebraska ===
Minnesota Golden Gophers at Nebraska Cornhuskers – Game summary

| Quarter | 1 | 2 | 3 | 4 | Total |
|---|---|---|---|---|---|
| Golden Gophers | 10 | 7 | 0 | 7 | 24 |
| Cornhuskers | 0 | 14 | 0 | 3 | 17 |

at Memorial Stadium, Lincoln, Nebraska

- Date: December 12
- Game time: 11:00 a.m. CST
- Game weather: Mostly cloudy, 32 °F (0 °C)
- Game attendance: 0
- Referee: Jeff Servinski
- TV announcers (FS1): Eric Collins and Ben Leber
- Box score, Recap

Game information
First quarter
- MINN – Mohamed Ibrahim 26-yard run (Anders Gelecinskyj kick), 7:26. Golden Gophers 7–0. Drive: 4 plays, 35 yards, 2:13.
- MINN – Anders Gelecinskyj 31-yard field goal, 0:14. Golden Gophers 10–0. Drive: 9 plays, 36 yards, 4:37.

Second quarter

- NEB – Austin Allen 8-yard pass from Adrian Martinez (Connor Culp kick), 13:12. Golden Gophers 10–7. Drive: 6 plays, 75 yards, 2:02.
- NEB – Adrian Martinez 7-yard run (Connor Culp kick), 2:57. Cornhuskers 14–10. Drive: 13 plays, 73 yards, 5:00.
- MINN – Brevyn Spann-Ford 4-yard pass from Tanner Morgan (Anders Gelecinskyj kick), 1:23. Golden Gophers 17–14. Drive: 6 plays, 75 yards, 1:34.

Third quarter

- No scoring plays

Fourth quarter

- MINN – Mohamed Ibrahim 1-yard run (Anders Gelecinskyj kick), 11:26. Golden Gophers 24–14. Drive: 9 plays, 39 yards, 3:55.
- NEB – Connor Culp 30-yard field goal, 4:42. Golden Gophers 24–17. Drive: 9 plays, 38 yards, 2:51.

| Statistics | MINN | NEB |
|---|---|---|
| First downs | 19 | 17 |
| Total yards | 387 | 308 |
| Rushing yards | 206 | 197 |
| Passing yards | 181 | 111 |
| Turnovers | 0 | 2 |
| Time of possession | 35:48 | 24:12 |

| Team | Category | Player | Statistics |
|---|---|---|---|
| Minnesota | Passing | Tanner Morgan | 17/30, 181 yards, TD |
| Minnesota | Rushing | Mohamed Ibrahim | 20 rushes, 108 yards, 2 TD |
| Minnesota | Receiving | Chris Autumn-Bell | 5 receptions, 82 yards |
| Nebraska | Passing | Adrian Martinez | 16/27, 111 yards, TD |
| Nebraska | Rushing | Adrian Martinez | 15 rushes, 96 yards, TD |
| Nebraska | Receiving | Wan'Dale Robinson | 6 receptions, 41 yards |

=== At Wisconsin ===
Minnesota Golden Gophers at Wisconsin Badgers – Game summary

| Quarter | 1 | 2 | 3 | 4 | OT | Total |
|---|---|---|---|---|---|---|
| Golden Gophers | 7 | 0 | 3 | 7 | 0 | 17 |
| Badgers | 0 | 7 | 7 | 3 | 3 | 20 |

at Camp Randall Stadium, Madison, Wisconsin

- Date: December 19
- Game time: 3:00 p.m. CST
- Game weather: Haze, 36 °F (2 °C)
- Game attendance: 1
- Referee: J. McGinn
- TV announcers (BTN): Mark Followill, Matt Millen, and Rick Pizzo
- Box score, Recap

Game information
First quarter
- MINN – Cam Wiley 16-yard pass from Tanner Morgan (Anders Gelecinskyj kick), 2:04. Golden Gophers 7–0. Drive: 6 plays, 53 yards, 3:32.

Second quarter

- WISC – Garrett Groshek 39-yard run (Collin Larsh kick), 14:17. Tied 7–7. Drive: 6 plays, 75 yards, 2:47.

Third quarter

- MINN – Anders Gelecinskyj 38-yard field goal, 7:07. Golden Gophers 10–7. Drive: 5 plays, 34 yards, 2:01.
- WISC – Jack Dunn 4-yard pass from Chase Wolf (Collin Larsh kick), 2:26. Badgers 14–10. Drive: 9 plays, 75 yards, 4:35.

Fourth quarter

- WISC – Collin Larsh 31-yard field goal, 11:30. Badgers 17–10. Drive: 8 plays, 34 yards, 4:21.
- MINN – Mike Brown-Stephens 9-yard pass from Tanner Morgan (Anders Gelecinskyj kick), 4:40. Tied 17–17. Drive: 12 plays, 75 yards, 6:50.

Overtime

- WISC – Collin Larsh 30-yard field goal. Badgers 20–17. Drive: 6 plays, 13 yards.

| Statistics | MINN | WISC |
|---|---|---|
| First downs | 18 | 18 |
| Total yards | 326 | 322 |
| Rushing yards | 146 | 175 |
| Passing yards | 180 | 147 |
| Turnovers | 1 | 1 |
| Time of possession | 29:32 | 30:28 |

| Team | Category | Player | Statistics |
|---|---|---|---|
| Minnesota | Passing | Tanner Morgan | 13/25, 160 yards, 2 TD, INT |
| Minnesota | Rushing | Mohamed Ibrahim | 26 rushes, 151 yards |
| Minnesota | Receiving | Daniel Jackson | 4 receptions, 67 yards |
| Wisconsin | Passing | Graham Mertz | 12/20, 132 yards |
| Wisconsin | Rushing | Garrett Groshek | 24 rushes, 154 yards, TD |
| Wisconsin | Receiving | Jack Dunn | 7 receptions, 76 yards, TD |

== Players drafted into the NFL ==
| Round | Pick | Player | Position | NFL Club |
|---|---|---|---|---|
| 1 | 27 | Rashod Bateman | WR | Baltimore Ravens |
| 2 | 74 | Benjamin St-Juste | CB | Washington Football Team |
