= 2020 Illinois Fighting Illini football team =

American college football season

2020 Illinois Fighting Illini football
- Conference: Big Ten Conference
- West Division
- Record: 2–6 (2–6 Big Ten)
- Head coach: Lovie Smith (5th season; first 7 games); Rod Smith (interim; remainder of season)
- Offensive coordinator: Rod Smith (3rd season)
- Offensive scheme: Multiple
- Base defense: 4–3
- Home stadium: Memorial Stadium

Uniform
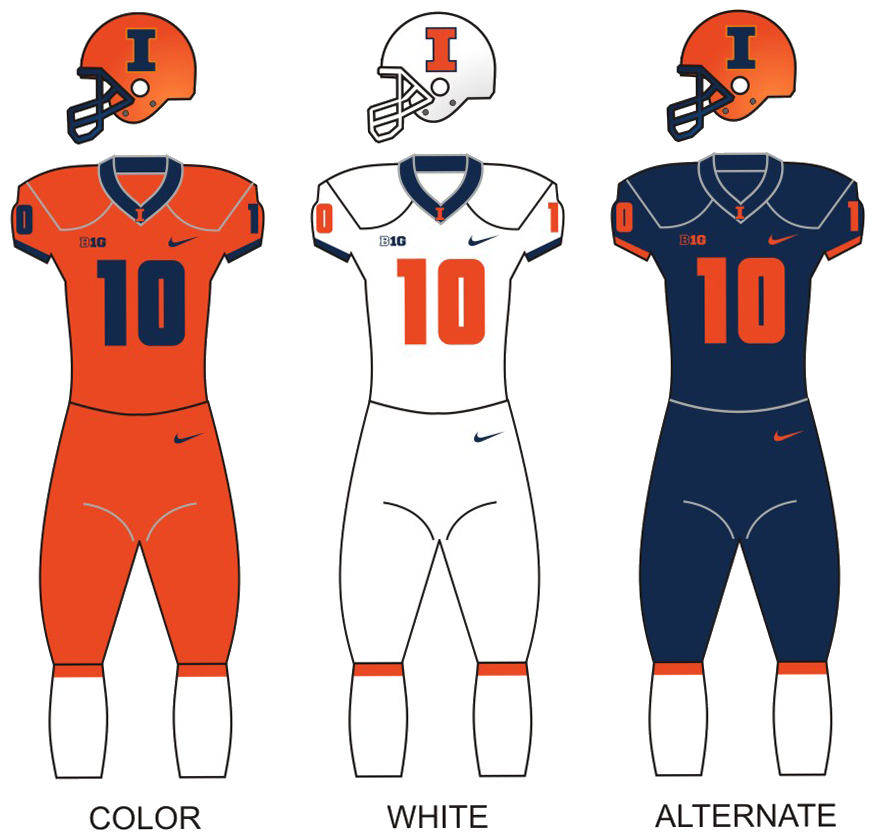

2020 Big Ten Conference football standings
| | Conf. | | | Overall |
| Team | W | | L | W | | L |
|---|---|---|---|---|---|---|
East Division
| No. 2 Ohio State xy$^ | 5 | – | 0 | 7 | – | 1 |
| No. 12 Indiana | 6 | – | 1 | 6 | – | 2 |
| Penn State | 4 | – | 5 | 4 | – | 5 |
| Maryland | 2 | – | 3 | 2 | – | 3 |
| Rutgers | 3 | – | 6 | 3 | – | 6 |
| Michigan | 2 | – | 4 | 2 | – | 4 |
| Michigan State | 2 | – | 5 | 2 | – | 5 |
West Division
| No. 10 Northwestern xy | 6 | – | 1 | 7 | – | 2 |
| No. 16 Iowa | 6 | – | 2 | 6 | – | 2 |
| Wisconsin | 3 | – | 3 | 4 | – | 3 |
| Minnesota | 3 | – | 4 | 3 | – | 4 |
| Nebraska | 3 | – | 5 | 3 | – | 5 |
| Purdue | 2 | – | 4 | 2 | – | 4 |
| Illinois | 2 | – | 6 | 2 | – | 6 |
Championship: Ohio State 22, Northwestern 10
^ – College Football Playoff participant; $ – Conference champion; x – Division champion/co-champions; y – Championship game participant; Note: Due to COVID-19, the Big Ten suspended the season on August 11, but later decided to begin play on October 24. In addition to the title game that was played on December 19, the conference seeded all remaining teams for "championship week" games.; Rankings from AP Poll.

The 2020 Illinois Fighting Illini football team was an American football team that represented the University of Illinois Urbana-Champaign as a member of the Big Ten Conference during the COVID-19 pandemic-shortened 2020 NCAA Division I FBS football season. In their fifth and final season under head coach Lovie Smith, the Fighting Illini compiled a 2–6 record (2–6 in conference games), finished in fifth place in the Big Ten's West Division, and were outscored by a total of 279 to 161. Prior to the team's final game, Smith was fired as head coach.

The team's statistical leaders included quarterback Brandon Peters (429 passing yards, 48.8% completion percentage), running back Chase Brown (540 rushing yards), wide receiver Josh Imatorbhebhe (22 receptions for 297 yards), kicker James McCourt (33 points, 15 of 15 extra points, 6 of 10 field goals), and linebacker Jake Hansen (68 total tackles, 36 solo tackles).

The team played its home games at Memorial Stadium in Champaign, Illinois.

== Big Ten preseason poll ==
The Big Ten preseason media prediction poll was released on July 31, 2020. The Fighting Illini were predicted to finish seventh (last) in the Big Ten West.

West
| Predicted finish | Team | Votes (1st place) |
|---|---|---|
| 1 | Wisconsin | 221 (19) |
| 2 | Minnesota | 209.5 (14) |
| 3 | Iowa | 157 |
| 4 | Nebraska | 117 |
| 5 | Purdue | 105 |
| 6 | Northwestern | 87.5 (1) |
| 7 | Illinois | 55 |

== Schedule ==
Illinois had games scheduled against Illinois State, UConn, and Bowling Green, but canceled these games on July 9 due to the Big Ten Conference's decision to play a conference-only schedule due to the COVID-19 pandemic.

| Date | Time | Opponent | Site | TV | Result | Attendance |
|---|---|---|---|---|---|---|
| October 23 | 7:00 p.m. | at No. 14 Wisconsin | Camp Randall Stadium; Madison, WI | BTN | L 7–45 | 0 |
| October 31 | 11:00 a.m. | Purdue | Memorial Stadium; Champaign, IL (rivalry) | BTN | L 24–31 | 838 |
| November 7 | 2:30 p.m. | Minnesota | Memorial Stadium; Champaign, IL | BTN | L 14–41 | 863 |
| November 14 | 12:00 p.m. | at Rutgers | SHI Stadium; Piscataway, NJ | BTN | W 23–20 | 0 |
| November 21 | 11:00 a.m. | at Nebraska | Memorial Stadium; Lincoln, NE | FS1 | W 41–23 | 0 |
| November 28 | 11:00 a.m. | No. 4 Ohio State | Memorial Stadium; Champaign, IL (Illibuck Trophy) | FS1 | No Contest | – |
| December 5 | 2:30 p.m. | No. 19 Iowa | Memorial Stadium; Champaign, IL | FS1 | L 21–35 | 875 |
| December 12 | 11:00 a.m. | at No. 14 Northwestern | Ryan Field; Evanston, IL (rivalry) | ESPN2 | L 10–28 | 0 |
| December 19 | 4:30 p.m. | at Penn State | Beaver Stadium; State College, PA | FS1 | L 21–56 | 0 |
Rankings from AP Poll and CFP Rankings (after November 24) released prior to game; All times are in Central time

== Roster ==
2020 Illinois Fighting Illini football team roster
Players
Coaches
Offense

| Pos. | # | Name | Class |
|---|---|---|---|
| QB | 1 | Isaiah Williams | Fr |
| RB | 2 | Chase Brown | So |
| RB | 3 | Jakari Norwood | So |
| WR | 4 | Khmari Thompson | So |
| WR | 5 | Trevon Sidney | Sr |
| QB | 6 | Deuce Spann | Fr |
| QB | 7 | Coran Taylor | So |
| WR | 8 | Casey Washington | So |
| WR | 9 | Josh Imatorbhebhe | Sr |
| WR | 10 | Desmond Dan Jr. | Sr |
| WR | 11 | Carlos Sany | So |
| QB | 12 | Matt Robinson | So |
| WR | 13 | James Frenchie Jr. | Fr |
| WR | 14 | Brian Hightower | Jr |
| WR | 15 | Ty Lindenman | Fr |
| QB | 16 | Josh Beetham | Fr |
| QB | 18 | Brandon Peters | Sr |
| WR | 19 | Dalevon Campbell | So |
| WR | 20 | Kyron Cumby | Fr |
| RB | 23 | Connor Lillig | Jr |
| RB | 24 | Nick Fedanzo | Fr |
| WR | 25 | Kerby Joseph | Jr |
| RB | 26 | Mike Epstein | Sr |
| RB | 27 | Matthew Bobak | Fr |
| RB | 28 | Reggie Love III | Fr |
| TE | 43 | Griffin Moore | Fr |
| OL | 52 | Verdis Brown | So |
| OL | 53 | Kendrick Green | Jr |
| OL | 54 | Julian Pearl | So |
| OL | 55 | Blake Jeresaty | Sr |
| OL | 57 | Evan Kirts | Fr |
| OL | 58 | Preston Engel | So |
| OL | 59 | Josh Plohr | Fr |
| OL | 62 | Terry Zapf | So |
| OL | 63 | Alex Palczewski | Sr |
| OL | 65 | Doug Kramer | Sr |
| OL | 66 | Jordyn Slaughter | So |
| OL | 68 | Ryan Ingold | Fr |
| OL | 69 | Moses Okpala | Fr |
| OL | 70 | Tommy Cronin | Fr |
| OL | 71 | Brett Novak | Fr |
| OL | 72 | Phifer Griffin | Fr |
| OL | 74 | Blaise Sparks | Fr |
| OL | 75 | Alex Philstrom | Jr |
| OL | 76 | Brevyn Jones | Fr |
| OL | 78 | Kevin Tyler | Fr |
| OL | 79 | Vederian Lowe | Sr |
| TE | 82 | Luke Ford | Jr |
| WR | 83 | John Bickel | Fr |
| WR | 84 | Owen Hickey | Fr |
| WR | 85 | Dylan Thomas | So |
| WR | 86 | Donny Navarro III | Jr |
| TE | 87 | Daniel Barker | Jr |
| TE | 88 | Daniel Imatorbhebhe | Sr |
| TE | 89 | Tip Reiman | Fr |

Defense

| Pos. | # | Name | Class |
|---|---|---|---|
| DB | 2 | Derrick Smith | Jr |
| DB | 3 | Marquez Beason | Fr |
| LB | 5 | Milo Eifler | Sr |
| DB | 6 | Tony Adams | Sr |
| DB | 8 | Nate Hobbs | Sr |
| DB | 17 | Kendall Smith | Sr |
| DB | 21 | Jartavius Martin | Jr |
| DB | 23 | Tahveon Nicholson | Fr |
| DB | 29 | Christian Bobak | Sr |
| DB | 30 | Sydney Brown | Jr |
| DB | 31 | Devon Witherspoon | So |
| DB | 32 | Tailon Leitzsey | Sr |
| DL | 33 | Ezekiel Holmes | So |
| LB | 34 | Ryan Meed | Fr |
| LB | 35 | Jake Hansen | Sr |
| DB | 36 | Ben Schultz | Fr |
| DB | 37 | Jaden Jones-Watkins | So |
| LB | 38 | Isaac Darkangelo | Jr |
| LB | 40 | Shammond Cooper | Fr |
| DL | 41 | Tre'Von Riggins | Fr |
| DB | 42 | Michael Marchese | Sr |
| DL | 43 | Cooper Davis | Fr |
| LB | 44 | Tarique Barnes | So |
| LB | 45 | Khalan Tolson | Jr |
| LB | 46 | Alex McEachern | Jr |
| DL | 47 | Quinton McCoy | Fr |
| DL | 48 | Bryce Barnes | So |
| DL | 49 | Seth Coleman | Fr |
| LB | 51 | Sean Coghlan | Jr |
| DL | 54 | Marc Mondesir | Sr |
| DL | 88 | Keith Randolph Jr. | Fr |
| DL | 90 | Anthony Shipton | Jr |
| DL | 91 | Jamal Woods | Sr |
| DL | 92 | Isaiah Gay | Sr |
| DL | 93 | Calvin Avery | Jr |
| DL | 94 | Jer'Zhan Newton | Fr |
| DL | 96 | Roderick Perry II | Sr |
| DL | 98 | Deon Pate | Jr |
| DL | 99 | Owen Carney Jr. | Sr |

Special teams

| Pos. | # | Name | Class |
|---|---|---|---|
| P, K | 11 | Caleb Griffin | So |
| P | 14 | Blake Hayes | Sr |
| K | 17 | James McCourt | Sr |
| P | 19 | Hugh Robertson | Fr |
| LS | 39 | Aidan Hall | Fr |
| LS | 56 | Ethan Tabel | Sr |

Head coach

- Lovie Smith
  First seven games
- Rod Smith
  Interim; final game

Coordinators/assistant coaches

- Rod Smith
  Offensive coordinator/Quarterbacks
- Bob Ligashesky
  Special teams coordinator
- Mike Bellamy
  Running backs
- Al Davis
  Defensive tackles
- Andrew Hayes-Stoker
  Wide receivers
- Keynodo Hudson
  Defensive backs
- Jimmy Lindsey
  Defensive ends
- Bob McClain
  Tight ends
- Cory Patterson
  Tight ends
- Miles Smith
  Linebackers

Legend

- (C) Team captain
- (S) Suspended
- (I) Ineligible
- Injured
- Redshirt

Roster
Last update: August 5, 2025

== Game summaries ==
=== At No. 14 Wisconsin ===
Illinois Fighting Illini at No. 14 Wisconsin Badgers – Game summary

| Quarter | 1 | 2 | 3 | 4 | Total |
|---|---|---|---|---|---|
| Fighting Illini | 0 | 7 | 0 | 0 | 7 |
| No. 14 Badgers | 7 | 21 | 0 | 17 | 45 |

at Camp Randall Stadium, Madison, Wisconsin

- Date: October 23
- Game time: 7:00 p.m. CDT
- Game weather: Cloudy, 39 °F (4 °C)
- Game attendance: 0
- Referee: Mark Kluczynski
- TV announcers (BTN): Brandon Gaudin, James Laurinaitis, and Rick Pizzo
- Box score, Recap

Game information
First quarter
- WISC – Mason Stokke 10-yard pass from Graham Mertz (Collin Larsh kick), 11:37. Badgers 7–0. Drive: 6 plays, 33 yards, 2:58.

Second quarter

- WISC – Jake Ferguson 5-yard pass from Graham Mertz (Collin Larsh kick), 11:54. Badgers 14–0. Drive: 14 plays, 88 yards, 8:17.
- ILL – Tarique Barnes 39-yard fumble return (James McCourt kick), 3:22. Badgers 14–7.
- WISC – Jake Ferguson 14-yard pass from Graham Mertz (Collin Larsh kick), 1:06. Badgers 21–7. Drive: 5 plays, 72 yards, 2:16.
- WISC – Danny Davis 53-yard pass from Graham Mertz (Collin Larsh kick), 0:28. Badgers 28–7. Drive: 1 play, 53 yards, 0:08.

Third quarter

- No scoring plays

Fourth quarter

- WISC – John Chenal 2-yard run (Collin Larsh kick), 12:23. Badgers 35–7. Drive: 10 plays, 66 yards, 5:44.
- WISC – Jake Ferguson 3-yard pass from Jake Ferguson (Collin Larsh kick), 4:53. Badgers 42–7. Drive: 11 plays, 74 yards, 6:46.
- WISC – Collin Larsh 19-yard field goal, 0:56. Badgers 45–7. Drive: 7 plays, 15 yards, 3:13.

| Statistics | ILL | WISC |
|---|---|---|
| First downs | 8 | 23 |
| Total yards | 218 | 430 |
| Rushing yards | 131 | 182 |
| Passing yards | 87 | 248 |
| Turnovers | 2 | 1 |
| Time of possession | 16:32 | 43:28 |

| Team | Category | Player | Statistics |
|---|---|---|---|
| Illinois | Passing | Brandon Peters | 8/19, 87 yards |
| Illinois | Rushing | Brandon Peters | 7 rushes, 75 yards |
| Illinois | Receiving | Josh Imatorbhebhe | 3 receptions, 26 yards |
| Wisconsin | Passing | Graham Mertz | 20/21, 248 yards, 5 TD |
| Wisconsin | Rushing | Garrett Groshek | 13 rushes, 70 yards |
| Wisconsin | Receiving | Jake Ferguson | 7 receptions, 72 yards, 3 TD |

=== Purdue ===
Purdue Boilermakers at Illinois Fighting Illini – Game summary

| Quarter | 1 | 2 | 3 | 4 | Total |
|---|---|---|---|---|---|
| Boilermakers | 7 | 10 | 14 | 0 | 31 |
| Fighting Illini | 0 | 10 | 0 | 14 | 24 |

at Memorial Stadium, Champaign, Illinois

- Date: October 31
- Game time: 11:00 a.m. CDT
- Game weather: Sunny, 48 °F (9 °C)
- Game attendance: 838
- Referee: Jeff Servinski
- TV announcers (BTN): Brandon Gaudin, James Laurinaitis, and Rick Pizzo
- Box score, Recap

Game information
First quarter
- PUR – Zander Horvath 1-yard run (J. D. Dellinger kick), 9:26. Boilermakers 7–0. Drive: 5 plays, 80 yards, 1:21.

Second quarter

- PUR – Milton Wright 45-yard pass from Aidan O'Connell (J. D. Dellinger kick), 11:01. Boilermakers 14–0. Drive: 7 plays, 91 yards, 3:28.
- ILL – Mike Epstein 7-yard run (Caleb Griffin kick), 4:46. Boilermakers 14–7. Drive: 7 plays, 49 yards, 2:32.
- PUR – J. D. Dellinger 36-yard field goal, 1:13. Boilermakers 17–7. Drive: 8 plays, 51 yards, 3:33.
- ILL – Caleb Griffin 28-yard field goal, 0:23. Boilermakers 17–10. Drive: 6 plays, 69 yards, 0:50.

Third quarter

- PUR – David Bell 3-yard pass from Aidan O'Connell (J. D. Dellinger kick), 8:47. Boilermakers 24–10. Drive: 4 plays, 8 yards, 1:47.
- PUR – Jalen Graham 0-yard fumble return (J. D. Dellinger kick), 0:54. Boilermakers 31–10.

Fourth quarter

- ILL – Daniel Imatorbhebhe 28-yard pass from Coran Taylor (Caleb Griffin kick), 11:44. Boilermakers 31–17. Drive: 8 plays, 75 yards, 4:10.
- ILL – Brian Hightower 9-yard pass from Coran Taylor (Caleb Griffin kick), 6:36. Boilermakers 31–24. Drive: 8 plays, 55 yards, 2:44.

| Statistics | PUR | ILL |
|---|---|---|
| First downs | 25 | 27 |
| Total yards | 456 | 472 |
| Rushing yards | 85 | 177 |
| Passing yards | 371 | 295 |
| Turnovers | 2 | 4 |
| Time of possession | 30:38 | 29:22 |

| Team | Category | Player | Statistics |
|---|---|---|---|
| Purdue | Passing | Aidan O'Connell | 29/35, 371 yards, 2 TD |
| Purdue | Rushing | Zander Horvath | 22 rushes, 102 yards, TD |
| Purdue | Receiving | David Bell | 9 receptions, 122 yards, TD |
| Illinois | Passing | Coran Taylor | 17/29, 273 yards, 2 TD, 2 INT |
| Illinois | Rushing | Chase Brown | 11 rushes, 73 yards |
| Illinois | Receiving | Brian Hightower | 4 receptions, 97 yards, TD |

=== Minnesota ===
Minnesota Golden Gophers at Illinois Fighting Illini – Game summary

| Quarter | 1 | 2 | 3 | 4 | Total |
|---|---|---|---|---|---|
| Golden Gophers | 7 | 21 | 7 | 6 | 41 |
| Fighting Illini | 0 | 7 | 0 | 7 | 14 |

at Memorial Stadium, Champaign, Illinois

- Date: November 7
- Game time: 2:30 p.m. CDT
- Game weather: Sunny, 72 °F (22 °C)
- Game attendance: 863
- Referee: Greg Blum
- TV announcers (BTN): Mark Followill, Anthony Herron, and Elise Menaker
- Box score, Recap

Game information
First quarter
- MINN – Treyson Potts 9-yard run (Michael Lantz kick), 3:29. Golden Gophers 7–0. Drive: 11 plays, 93 yards, 4:24.

Second quarter

- MINN – Rashod Bateman 5-yard pass from Tanner Morgan (Michael Lantz kick), 13:23. Golden Gophers 14–0. Drive: 6 plays, 61 yards, 1:58.
- MINN – Mohamed Ibrahim 1-yard run (Michael Lantz kick), 8:09. Golden Gophers 21–0. Drive: 8 plays, 77 yards, 4:08.
- ILL – Mike Epstein 1-yard run (Caleb Griffin kick), 5:32. Golden Gophers 21–7. Drive: 6 plays, 83 yards, 2:37.
- MINN – Mohamed Ibrahim 2-yard run (Michael Lantz kick), 0:24. Golden Gophers 28–7. Drive: 10 plays, 75 yards, 5:08.

Third quarter

- MINN – Mohamed Ibrahim 1-yard run (Michael Lantz kick), 0:21. Golden Gophers 35–7. Drive: 7 plays, 71 yards, 3:53.

Fourth quarter

- ILL – Josh Imatorbhebhe 52-yard pass from Coran Taylor (Caleb Griffin kick), 11:30. Golden Gophers 35–14. Drive: 3 plays, 79 yards, 0:54.
- MINN – Mohamed Ibrahim 4-yard run (kick failed), 8:27. Golden Gophers 41–14. Drive: 5 plays, 62 yards, 3:03.

| Statistics | MINN | ILL |
|---|---|---|
| First downs | 30 | 14 |
| Total yards | 541 | 287 |
| Rushing yards | 325 | 181 |
| Passing yards | 216 | 106 |
| Turnovers | 2 | 0 |
| Time of possession | 37:35 | 22:25 |

| Team | Category | Player | Statistics |
|---|---|---|---|
| Minnesota | Passing | Tanner Morgan | 17/27, 216 yards, TD, INT |
| Minnesota | Rushing | Mohamed Ibrahim | 30 rushes, 224 yards, 4 TD |
| Minnesota | Receiving | Rashod Bateman | 10 receptions, 139 yards, TD |
| Illinois | Passing | Coran Taylor | 6/17, 106 yards, TD |
| Illinois | Rushing | Mike Epstein | 11 rushes, 108 yards, TD |
| Illinois | Receiving | Josh Imatorbhebhe | 2 receptions, 60 yards, TD |

=== At Rutgers ===
Illinois Fighting Illini at Rutgers Scarlet Knights – Game summary

| Quarter | 1 | 2 | 3 | 4 | Total |
|---|---|---|---|---|---|
| Fighting Illini | 0 | 7 | 10 | 6 | 23 |
| Scarlet Knights | 10 | 3 | 7 | 0 | 20 |

at SHI Stadium, Piscataway, New Jersey

- Date: November 14
- Game time: 12:00 p.m. CST / 1:00 p.m. EST
- Game weather: Partly cloudy, 54 °F (12 °C)
- Game attendance: 0
- Referee: Mark Kluczynski
- TV announcers (FS1): Lisa Byington, Jeremy Leman, and Coley Harvey
- Box score, Recap

Game information
First quarter
- RUTG – Bo Melton 29-yard pass from Noah Vedral (Valentino Ambrosio kick), 13:03. Scarlet Knights 7–0. Drive: 6 plays, 75 yards, 1:57.
- RUTG – Valentino Ambrosio 29-yard field goal, 4:33. Scarlet Knights 10–0. Drive: 6 plays, 18 yards, 3:19.

Second quarter

- ILL – Isaiah Williams 3-yard run (James McCourt kick), 13:45. Scarlet Knights 10–7. Drive: 12 plays, 87 yards, 5:48.
- RUTG – Valentino Ambrosio 26-yard field goal, 4:19. Scarlet Knights 13–7. Drive: 9 plays, 75 yards, 4:02.

Third quarter

- ILL – James McCourt 24-yard field goal, 8:59. Scarlet Knights 13–10. Drive: 12 plays, 69 yards, 6:01.
- RUTG – Bo Melton 66-yard pass from Noah Vedral (Valentino Ambrosio kick), 7:43. Scarlet Knights 20–10. Drive: 5 plays, 80 yards, 1:16.
- ILL – Mike Epstein 1-yard run (James McCourt kick), 4:54. Scarlet Knights 20–17. Drive: 6 plays, 75 yards, 2:49.

Fourth quarter

- ILL – James McCourt 23-yard field goal, 13:02. Tied 20–20. Drive: 12 plays, 57 yards, 4:31.
- ILL – James McCourt 47-yard field goal, 0:03. Fighting Illini 23–20. Drive: 6 plays, 25 yards, 1:14.

| Statistics | ILL | RUTG |
|---|---|---|
| First downs | 23 | 19 |
| Total yards | 442 | 422 |
| Rushing yards | 338 | 166 |
| Passing yards | 104 | 256 |
| Turnovers | 1 | 3 |
| Time of possession | 34:38 | 25:22 |

| Team | Category | Player | Statistics |
|---|---|---|---|
| Illinois | Passing | Isaiah Williams | 7/18, 104 yards |
| Illinois | Rushing | Isaiah Williams | 31 rushes, 192 yards, TD |
| Illinois | Receiving | Casey Washington | 3 receptions, 52 yards |
| Scarlet | Passing | Noah Vedral | 21/34, 256 yards, 2 TD, 3 INT |
| Scarlet | Rushing | Isiah Pacheco | 20 rushes, 133 yards |
| Scarlet | Receiving | Bo Melton | 5 receptions, 150 yards, 2 TD |

=== At Nebraska ===
Illinois Fighting Illini at Nebraska Cornhuskers – Game summary

| Quarter | 1 | 2 | 3 | 4 | Total |
|---|---|---|---|---|---|
| Fighting Illini | 14 | 14 | 10 | 3 | 41 |
| Cornhuskers | 7 | 3 | 7 | 6 | 23 |

at Memorial Stadium, Lincoln, Nebraska

- Date: November 21
- Game time: 11:00 a.m. CST
- Game weather: Overcast, 45 °F (7 °C)
- Game attendance: 0
- Referee: John O'Neill
- TV announcers (FS1): Brian Custer and Robert Smith
- Box score, Recap

Game information
First quarter
- ILL – Chase Brown 3-yard run (James McCourt kick), 13:31. Fighting Illini 7–0. Drive: 3 plays, 21 yards, 1:17.
- NEB – Luke McCaffrey 5-yard run (Connor Culp kick), 9:20. Tied 7–7. Drive: 12 plays, 71 yards, 4:05.
- ILL – Chase Brown 2-yard run (James McCourt kick), 5:39. Fighting Illini 14–7. Drive: 9 plays, 75 yards, 3:41.

Second quarter

- ILL – Josh Imatorbhebhe 28-yard pass from Brandon Peters (James McCourt kick), 13:48. Fighting Illini 21–7. Drive: 7 plays, 65 yards, 3:44.
- NEB – Connor Culp 30-yard field goal, 7:32. Fighting Illini 21–10. Drive: 10 plays, 52 yards, 4:00.
- ILL – Mike Epstein 1-yard run (James McCourt kick), 5:50. Fighting Illini 28–10. Drive: 4 plays, 89 yards, 1:35.

Third quarter

- ILL – James McCourt 24-yard field goal, 8:23. Fighting Illini 31–10. Drive: 16 plays, 65 yards, 6:31.
- NEB – Luke McCaffrey 1-yard run (Connor Culp kick), 6:48. Fighting Illini 31–17. Drive: 6 plays, 75 yards, 1:35.
- ILL – Brandon Peters 1-yard run (James McCourt kick), 2:31. Fighting Illini 38–17. Drive: 10 plays, 75 yards, 4:17.

Fourth quarter

- ILL – James McCourt 21-yard field goal, 10:14. Fighting Illini 41–17. Drive: 12 plays, 41 yards, 5:42.
- NEB – Levi Falck 4-yard pass from Adrian Martinez (run failed), 2:12. Fighting Illini 41–23. Drive: 7 plays, 54 yards, 1:58.

| Statistics | ILL | NEB |
|---|---|---|
| First downs | 25 | 25 |
| Total yards | 490 | 392 |
| Rushing yards | 285 | 215 |
| Passing yards | 205 | 177 |
| Turnovers | 0 | 5 |
| Time of possession | 36:21 | 23:39 |

| Team | Category | Player | Statistics |
|---|---|---|---|
| Illinois | Passing | Brandon Peters | 18/25, 205 yards, TD |
| Illinois | Rushing | Mike Epstein | 13 rushes, 113 yards, TD |
| Illinois | Receiving | Josh Imatorbhebhe | 4 receptions, 71 yards, TD |
| Nebraska | Passing | Luke McCaffrey | 15/26, 134 yards, 3 INT |
| Nebraska | Rushing | Luke McCaffrey | 26 rushes, 122 yards, 2 TD |
| Nebraska | Receiving | Wan'Dale Robinson | 6 receptions, 60 yards |

=== No. 19 Iowa ===
No. 19 Iowa Hawkeyes at Illinois Fighting Illini – Game summary

| Quarter | 1 | 2 | 3 | 4 | Total |
|---|---|---|---|---|---|
| No. 19 Hawkeyes | 0 | 13 | 8 | 14 | 35 |
| Fighting Illini | 7 | 7 | 0 | 7 | 21 |

at Memorial Stadium, Champaign, Illinois

- Date: December 5
- Game time: 2:30 p.m. CST
- Game weather: Sunny, 44 °F (7 °C)
- Game attendance: 875
- Referee: Jerry McGinn
- TV announcers (FS1): Eric Collins and Ben Leber
- Box score, Recap

Game information
First quarter
- ILL – Daniel Barker 24-yard pass from Brandon Peters (James McCourt kick), 8:10. Fighting Illini 7–0. Drive: 9 plays, 70 yards, 4:32.

Second quarter

- ILL – Josh Imatorbhebhe 12-yard pass from Brandon Peters (James McCourt kick), 13:30. Fighting Illini 14–0. Drive: 8 plays, 75 yards, 3:24.
- IOWA – Sam LaPorta 22-yard pass from Spencer Petras (Keith Duncan kick), 6:18. Fighting Illini 14–7. Drive: 8 plays, 52 yards, 3:35.
- IOWA – Keith Duncan 40-yard field goal, 2:54. Fighting Illini 14–10. Drive: 6 plays, 32 yards, 2:16.
- IOWA – Keith Duncan 27-yard field goal, 0:14. Fighting Illini 14–13. Drive: 8 plays, 44 yards, 1:15.

Third quarter

- IOWA – Ihmir Smith-Marsette 4-yard pass from Spencer Petras (Spencer Petras pass to Tyler Goodson), 8:24. Hawkeyes 21–14. Drive: 9 plays, 70 yards, 4:35.

Fourth quarter

- IOWA – Shaun Beyer 16-yard pass from Spencer Petras (Keith Duncan kick), 12:40. Hawkeyes 28–14. Drive: 2 plays, 32 yards, 0:52.
- IOWA – Ihmir Smith-Marsette 13-yard run (Keith Duncan kick), 1:56. Hawkeyes 35–14. Drive: 10 plays, 88 yards, 5:35.
- ILL – Carlos Sandy 29-yard pass from Isaiah Williams (James McCourt kick), 0:24. Hawkeyes 35–21. Drive: 10 plays, 75 yards, 1:32.

| Statistics | IOWA | ILL |
|---|---|---|
| First downs | 22 | 20 |
| Total yards | 424 | 348 |
| Rushing yards | 204 | 149 |
| Passing yards | 220 | 199 |
| Turnovers | 0 | 0 |
| Time of possession | 30:26 | 29:34 |

| Team | Category | Player | Statistics |
|---|---|---|---|
| Iowa | Passing | Spencer Petras | 18/28, 220 yards, 3 TD |
| Iowa | Rushing | Tyler Goodson | 19 rushes, 92 yards |
| Iowa | Receiving | Brandon Smith | 5 receptions, 58 yards |
| Illinois | Passing | Brandon Peters | 10/18, 116 yards, 2 TD |
| Illinois | Rushing | Chase Brown | 18 rushes, 83 yards |
| Illinois | Receiving | Josh Imatorbhebhe | 4 receptions, 48 yards, TD |

=== At No. 14 Northwestern ===
Illinois Fighting Illini at No. 14 Northwestern Wildcats – Game summary

| Quarter | 1 | 2 | 3 | 4 | Total |
|---|---|---|---|---|---|
| Fighting Illini | 3 | 0 | 0 | 7 | 10 |
| No. 14 Wildcats | 0 | 14 | 14 | 0 | 28 |

at Ryan Field, Evanston, Illinois

- Date: December 12
- Game time: 11:00 a.m. CST
- Game weather: Rain and snow, 34 °F (1 °C)
- Game attendance: 0
- Referee: Mark Kluczynski
- TV announcers (ESPN2): Kevin Brown, Mike Golic, and Taylor McGregor
- Box score, Recap

Game information
First quarter
- ILL – James McCourt 39-yard field goal, 1:49. Fighting Illini 3–0. Drive: 14 plays, 59 yards, 7:29.

Second quarter

- NW – Charlie Mangieri 2-yard pass from Peyton Ramsey (Charlie Kuhbander kick), 14:56. Wildcats 7–3. Drive: 6 plays, 75 yards, 1:53.
- NW – Cam Porter 2-yard run (Charlie Kuhbander kick), 0:24. Wildcats 14–3. Drive: 17 plays, 64 yards, 7:02.

Third quarter

- NW – Cam Porter 18-yard run (Charlie Kuhbander kick), 10:53. Wildcats 21–3. Drive: 9 plays, 75 yards, 4:07.
- NW – Evan Hull 32-yard run (Charlie Kuhbander kick), 4:02. Wildcats 28–3. Drive: 10 plays, 81 yards, 6:04.

Fourth quarter

- ILL – Brian Hightower 46-yard pass from Isaiah Williams (James McCourt kick), 8:47. Wildcats 28–10. Drive: 7 plays, 86 yards, 1:38.

| Statistics | ILL | NW |
|---|---|---|
| First downs | 14 | 23 |
| Total yards | 262 | 493 |
| Rushing yards | 155 | 411 |
| Passing yards | 107 | 82 |
| Turnovers | 0 | 1 |
| Time of possession | 25:25 | 34:35 |

| Team | Category | Player | Statistics |
|---|---|---|---|
| Illinois | Passing | Isaiah Williams | 4/8, 86 yards, TD |
| Illinois | Rushing | Chase Brown | 14 rushes, 70 yards |
| Illinois | Receiving | Brian Hightower | 2 receptions, 60 yards, TD |
| Northwestern | Passing | Peyton Ramsey | 7/12, 82 yards, TD |
| Northwestern | Rushing | Evan Hull | 13 rushes, 143 yards, TD |
| Northwestern | Receiving | Kyric McGowan | 4 receptions, 72 yards |

=== At Penn State ===
Illinois Fighting Illini at Penn State Nittany Lions – Game summary

| Quarter | 1 | 2 | 3 | 4 | Total |
|---|---|---|---|---|---|
| Fighting Illini | 21 | 0 | 0 | 0 | 21 |
| Nittany Lions | 21 | 21 | 7 | 7 | 56 |

at Beaver Stadium, State College, Pennsylvania

- Date: December 19
- Game time: 4:30 p.m. CST / 5:30 p.m. EST
- Game weather: Cloudy, 30 °F (−1 °C)
- Game attendance: 0
- Referee: John O'Neill
- TV announcers (FS1): Cory Provus and Robert Smith
- Box score, Recap

Game information
First quarter
- PSU – Jahan Dotson 75-yard pass from Sean Clifford (Jake Pinegar kick), 14:48. Nittany Lions 7–0. Drive: 1 play, 75 yards, 0:12.
- ILL – Brian Hightower 5-yard pass from Isaiah Williams (James McCourt kick), 11:06. Tied 7–7. Drive: 4 plays, 16 yards, 1:36.
- PSU – Lamont Wade 100-yard kickoff return (Jake Pinegar kick), 10:51. Nittany Lions 14–7.
- ILL – Chase Brown 12-yard run (James McCourt kick), 9:50. Tied 14–14. Drive: 3 plays, 75 yards, 1:01.
- ILL – Daniel Barker 38-yard pass from Isaiah Williams (James McCourt kick), 6:10. Fighting Illini 21–14. Drive: 4 plays, 63 yards, 1:37.
- PSU – Will Levis 4-yard run (Jake Pinegar kick), 1:13. Tied 21–21. Drive: 10 plays, 75 yards, 4:57.

Second quarter

- PSU – Caziah Holmes 3-yard run (Jake Pinegar kick), 14:04. Nittany Lions 28–21. Drive: 2 plays, 10 yards, 0:40.
- PSU – Keyvone Lee 1-yard run (Jake Pinegar kick), 5:32. Nittany Lions 35–21. Drive: 15 plays, 91 yards, 6:48.
- PSU – Jahan Dotson 70-yard pass from Sean Clifford (Jake Pinegar kick), 3:49. Nittany Lions 42–21. Drive: 1 play, 70 yards, 0:12.

Third quarter

- PSU – Brenton Strange 7-yard pass from Will Levis (Jake Pinegar kick), 0:20. Nittany Lions 49–21. Drive: 9 plays, 68 yards, 4:23.

Fourth quarter

- PSU – Caziah Holmes 1-yard run (Jake Pinegar kick), 3:32. Nittany Lions 56–21. Drive: 10 plays, 79 yards, 5:09.

| Statistics | ILL | PSU |
|---|---|---|
| First downs | 12 | 28 |
| Total yards | 273 | 580 |
| Rushing yards | 153 | 253 |
| Passing yards | 120 | 327 |
| Turnovers | 2 | 1 |
| Time of possession | 25:10 | 34:50 |

| Team | Category | Player | Statistics |
|---|---|---|---|
| Illinois | Passing | Isaiah Williams | 8/18, 120 yards, 2 TD, INT |
| Illinois | Rushing | Isaiah Williams | 15 rushes, 102 yards |
| Illinois | Receiving | Daniel Barker | 3 receptions, 54 yards, TD |
| Penn State | Passing | Sean Clifford | 16/22, 285 yards, 2 TD |
| Penn State | Rushing | Keyvone Lee | 19 rushes, 85 yards, TD |
| Penn State | Receiving | Jahan Dotson | 6 receptions, 189 yards, 2 TD |

== 2021 NFL draft ==
| Round | Pick | Player | Position | NFL Club |
|---|---|---|---|---|
| 3 | 87 | Kendrick Green | OG | Pittsburgh Steelers |
| 5 | 167 | Nate Hobbs | CB | Las Vegas Raiders |
