= 2020 Iowa Hawkeyes football team =

American college football season

2020 Iowa Hawkeyes football

Music City Bowl, No contest vs. Missouri
- Conference: Big Ten Conference
- West Division

Ranking
- Coaches: No. 15
- AP: No. 16
- Record: 6–2 (6–2 Big Ten)
- Head coach: Kirk Ferentz (22nd season)
- Offensive coordinator: Brian Ferentz (4th season)
- Offensive scheme: Multiple
- Defensive coordinator: Phil Parker (9th season)
- Base defense: 4–2–5
- Home stadium: Kinnick Stadium

2020 Big Ten Conference football standings
	Conf.			Overall
Team	W		L	W		L
East Division
No. 2 Ohio State xy$^	5	–	0	7	–	1
No. 12 Indiana	6	–	1	6	–	2
Penn State	4	–	5	4	–	5
Maryland	2	–	3	2	–	3
Rutgers	3	–	6	3	–	6
Michigan	2	–	4	2	–	4
Michigan State	2	–	5	2	–	5
West Division
No. 10 Northwestern xy	6	–	1	7	–	2
No. 16 Iowa	6	–	2	6	–	2
Wisconsin	3	–	3	4	–	3
Minnesota	3	–	4	3	–	4
Nebraska	3	–	5	3	–	5
Purdue	2	–	4	2	–	4
Illinois	2	–	6	2	–	6
Championship: Ohio State 22, Northwestern 10
^ – College Football Playoff participant; $ – Conference champion; x – Division champion/co-champions; y – Championship game participant; Note: Due to COVID-19, the Big Ten suspended the season on August 11, but later decided to begin play on October 24. In addition to the title game that was played on December 19, the conference seeded all remaining teams for "championship week" games.; Rankings from AP Poll.

The 2020 Iowa Hawkeyes football team represented the University of Iowa during the 2020 NCAA Division I FBS football season. The Hawkeyes played their home games at Kinnick Stadium in Iowa City, Iowa, and competed in the West Division of the Big Ten Conference. They were led by 22nd-year head coach Kirk Ferentz.

On August 11, 2020, the Big Ten Conference canceled all fall sports competitions due to the COVID-19 pandemic. However, on September 16, the Big Ten reinstated the season, announcing an eight-game season beginning on October 24. The Hawkeyes compiled a 6–2 record, all in conference games. The team was set to face Missouri in the Music City Bowl, but the game was canceled after Missouri had to withdraw due to COVID-19 issues.

Junior defensive lineman Daviyon Nixon was named Big Ten Defensive Lineman of the Year, Big Ten Defensive Player of the Year, and was a unanimous First-team All-American.

== Schedule ==
Iowa had games scheduled against Northern Iowa, Iowa State, and Northern Illinois, but canceled these games on July 9 due to the Big Ten Conference's decision to play a conference-only schedule due to the COVID-19 pandemic.

Date	Time	Opponent	Rank	Site	TV	Result	Attendance
October 24	2:30 p.m.	at Purdue		Ross–Ade Stadium; West Lafayette, IN	BTN	L 20–24	900
October 31	2:30 p.m.	Northwestern^{†}		Kinnick Stadium; Iowa City, IA	ESPN	L 20–21	1,432
November 7	11:00 a.m.	Michigan State		Kinnick Stadium; Iowa City, IA	ESPN	W 49–7	1,441
November 13	6:00 p.m.	at Minnesota		TCF Bank Stadium; Minneapolis, MN (Floyd of Rosedale)	FS1	W 35–7	771
November 21	2:30 p.m.	at Penn State		Beaver Stadium; University Park, PA	BTN	W 41–21	1,500
November 27	12:00 p.m.	Nebraska	No. 24	Kinnick Stadium; Iowa City, IA (The Heroes Game)	FOX	W 26–20	1,469
December 5	2:30 p.m.	at Illinois	No. 19	Memorial Stadium; Champaign, IL	FS1	W 35–21	875
December 12	2:30 p.m.	Wisconsin	No. 16	Kinnick Stadium; Iowa City, IA (rivalry)	FS1	W 28–7	1,445
December 19	6:00 p.m.	Michigan	No. 16	Kinnick Stadium; Iowa City, IA (Champions Week)	ESPN	No contest	–
December 30	3:00 p.m.	vs. Missouri*	No. 15	Nissan Stadium; Nashville, TN (Music City Bowl)	ESPN	No contest	–
^{†}Homecoming; Rankings from AP Poll and CFP Rankings (after November 24) released prior to game; All times are in Central time

| Michigan and Missouri were canceled due to COVID-19.|

== Roster ==
2020 Iowa Hawkeyes football team roster
Players
Coaches
Offense

Pos.	#	Name	Class
QB	2	Deuce Hogan	Fr
QB	11	Connor Kapisak	So
QB	8	Alex Padilla	So
QB	7	Spencer Petras	So
RB	23	Shadrick Byrd	Fr
RB	15	Tyler Goodson	So
RB	21	Ivory Kelly-Martin	Jr
RB	20	Keontae Luckett	Fr
RB	10	Mekhi Sargent	Sr
RB	25	Gavin Williams	Fr
RB	4	Leshon Williams	Fr
FB	41	Colton Dinsdale	Sr
FB	40	Turner Pallissard	So
FB	32	Johnny Plewa	Fr
FB	38	Monte Pottebaum	So
WR	9	Jack Combs	Jr
WR	19	Max Cooper	Sr
WR	1	Nolan Donald	Fr
WR	26	Jamison Heinz	Fr
WR	81	Desmond Hutson	Fr
WR	27	Jack Johnson	Fr
WR	16	Charlie Jones	Jr
WR	83	Alec Kritta	Fr
WR	82	Calvin Lockett	So
WR	14	Quavon Matthews	Fr
WR	89	Nico Ragaini	So
WR	29	Jackson Ritter	Fr
WR	12	Brandon Smith	Sr
WR	6	Ihmir Smith-Marsette	Sr
WR	3	Tyrone Tracy	So
WR	18	Diante Vines	Fr
WR	28	Isaiah Wagner	Fr
WR	17	Wyatt Wegener	Fr
TE	42	Shaun Beyer	Sr
TE	88	Jackson Frericks	Fr
TE	46	Tommy Kujawa	Jr
TE	85	Luke Lachey	Fr
TE	84	Sam LaPorta	So
TE	80	Josiah Miamen	Fr
TE	48	Bryce Schulte	Jr
TE	47	Andrew Wilson	Fr
TE	87	Elijah Yelverton	Fr
OL	61	Cole Banwart	Sr
OL	63	Justin Britt	Fr
OL	51	Coy Cronk	Sr
OL	56	Nick DeJong	Fr
OL	76	Tyler Elsbury	Fr
OL	55	Luke Empen	So
OL	69	Tyler Endres	Fr
OL	54	Matt Fagan	So
OL	52	Asher Fahey	Fr
OL	60	Noah Fenske	Fr
OL	73	Cody Ince	So
OL	77	Alaric Jackson	Sr
OL	71	Mark Kallenberger	Jr
OL	72	Coy Kirkpatrick	Jr
OL	65	Tyler Linderbaum	So
OL	79	Jack Plumb	So
OL	78	Mason Richman	Fr
OL	64	Kyler Schott	Jr
OL	57	Clayton Thurm	Fr
OL	75	Josh Volk	Fr

Defense

Pos.	#	Name	Class
DE	13	Joe Evans	So
DL	94	Yahya Black	Fr
DL	88	Isaiah Bruce	Fr
DL	45	Deontae Craig	Fr
DL	53	Spencer Daufeldt	Fr
DL	58	Taylor Fox	Fr
DL	57	Chauncey Golston	Sr
DL	96	Jack Heflin	Sr
DL	48	Ethan Hurkett	Fr
DL	66	Dalles Jacobus	Sr
DL	95	Logan Jones	Fr
DL	93	Jake Karchinski	Fr
DL	85	Logan Lee	Fr
DL		Michael Lois	Fr
DL	43	Matt Lorbeck	Sr
DL	90	Taajhir McCall	Fr
DL	98	Chris Reames	Fr
DL	74	Austin Schulte	Sr
DL	99	Noah Shannon	So
DL	92	John Waggoner	So
DL	86	Jameson Witte	Fr
DL	91	Lukas Van Ness	Fr
DL	97	Zach VanValkenburg	Sr
DT	54	Daviyon Nixon	Jr
DT	50	Louie Stec	Fr
LB	47	Nick Anderson	Sr
LB	44	Seth Benson	So
LB	31	Jack Campbell	So
LB	34	Jay Higgins	Fr
LB	5	Jestin Jacobs	Fr
LB	55	Yahweh Jeudy	Fr
LB	46	Logan Klemp	So
LB	49	Nick Niemann	Sr
LB	40	Josef Smith	Fr
LB	36	Mike Timm	So
LB	35	Barrington Wade	Sr
DB	4	Dane Belton	So
DB	7	Reggie Bracy	Fr
DB	20	JuJu Brents	So
DB	29	Sebastian Castro	Fr
DB	15	Dallas Craddieth	So
DB	17	Brenden Deasfernandes	Fr
DB	37	Kyler Fisher	Fr
DB	8	Matt Hankins	Sr
DB	27	Jermari Harris	Fr
DB	21	Thomas Hartlieb	Fr
DB	28	Jack Koerner	Jr
DB	11	AJ Lawson	Fr
DB	13	Henry Marchese	Jr
DB	14	Daraun McKinney	Fr
DB	26	Kaevon Merriweather	So
DB	33	Riley Moss	Jr
DB	16	Terry Roberts	So
DB	30	Quinn Schulte	Fr

Special teams

Pos.	#	Name	Class
K	96	Lucas Amaya	Fr
K	1	Aaron Blom	Fr
K	3	Keith Duncan	Sr
K	94	Caleb Shudak	Sr
P	2	Ryan Gersonde	Jr
P	9	Tory Taylor	Fr
P	45	Nick Phelps	So
LS	50	Zach Kluver	Fr
LS	84	Austin Spiewak	Sr
LS	97	Liam Reardon	Fr

Head coach

- Kirk Ferentz

Coordinators/assistant coaches

- Brian Ferentz – Offensive Coordinator/Tight Ends
- Phil Parker – Defensive Coordinator/Secondary
- LeVar Woods – Special Teams Coordinator
- Kelvin Bell – Defensive Line
- Kelton Copeland – Wide Receivers
- Derrick Foster – Running Backs/Offensive Recruiting Coordinator
- Jay Niemann – Assistant Defensive Line/Defensive Recruiting Coordinator
- Ken O'Keefe – Quarterbacks
- Tim Polasek– Offensive Line
- Seth Wallace – Assistant Defensive Coordinator/Linebackers
- Raimond Braithwaite – Interim Director, Strength and Conditioning
- Kohle Helle – Assistant, Strength and Conditioning
- Ben Morse – Assistant, Strength and Conditioning
- Cody Myers – Assistant, Strength and Conditioning
- Drew Heitland – Nutrition & Performance Analytics
- Paul Federici – Director, Football Operations
- Ben Hansen – Assistant Director, Football Operations
- Sam Brincks – Interim Director, Player Development
- Scott Southmayd – Director, Player Personnel
- Tyler Barnes – Director, Recruiting
- Justin Floyd – Graduate Assistant
- Dylan Chmura – Graduate Assistant
- Keeston Terry – Graduate Assistant
- Shane Viilo – Graduate Assistant
- Austin Showalter – Director of Football Analytics
- Martin Hopkins – Football Analyst
- Tyler Parker – Football Analyst
- Bob Rahfeldt – Video Coordinator

Legend

- (C) Team captain
- (S) Suspended
- (I) Ineligible
- Injured
- Redshirt

Roster
Last update: 10/11/20

== Rankings ==
Ranking movements Legend: ██ Increase in ranking ██ Decrease in ranking — = Not ranked RV = Received votes
	Week																	
Poll	Pre	1	2	3	4	5	6	7	8	9	10	11	12	13	14	15	16	Final
AP	24	none	—*	—*	RV	RV	RV	RV	—	—	—	RV	RV	24	19	18	17	16
Coaches	23	none	—*	RV	RV	RV	RV	RV	RV	—	—	—	RV	24	18	17	16	15
CFP	Not released												24	19	16	16	15	Not released

(*) Big Ten Conference members were not eligible for the Week 2 of the AP and Coaches Polls and Week 3 of the AP due to not having a scheduled season at the time.

== Game summaries ==
=== At Purdue ===
Iowa at Purdue

Team	1	2	3	4	Total
Hawkeyes	0	17	0	3	20
• Boilermakers	7	7	0	10	24

- Date: October 24
- Location:
  Ross–Ade Stadium
  West Lafayette, IN
- Game start: 3:40 p.m. EDT
- Elapsed time: 3:21
- Game attendance: 900
- Game weather: 51 °F (11 °C), Mostly Sunny, Wind NE 9 mph (14 km/h)
- Referee: John O'Neill
- TV announcers (BTN): Cory Provus, Anthony Herron and Coley Harvey
- Source: Box Score

Scoring summary
1	7:07	Purdue	David Bell 9-yard pass from Aidan O'Connell (J.D. Dellinger kick)	Purdue 7–0
2	10:21	Iowa	Spencer Petras 1-yard run (Keith Duncan kick)	Tied 7–7
2	4:42	Iowa	Mekhi Sargent 1-yard run (Keith Duncan kick)	Iowa 14–7
2	1:40	Purdue	David Bell 11-yard pass from Aidan O'Connell (J.D. Dellinger kick)	Tied 14–14
2	0:00	Iowa	Keith Duncan 27-yard field goal	Iowa 17–14
4	13:12	Iowa	Keith Duncan 33-yard field goal	Iowa 20–14
4	8:20	Purdue	J.D. Dellinger 29-yard field goal	Iowa 20–17
4	2:15	Purdue	David Bell 6-yard pass from Aidan O'Connell (J.D. Dellinger kick)	Purdue 24–20

Statistics	IOWA	PUR
First downs	19	24
Total yards	460	386
Rushing yards	195	104
Passing yards	265	282
Turnovers	2	2
Time of possession	29:49	30:11

Team	Category	Player	Statistics
Iowa	Passing	Spencer Petras	22–39, 265 yards
Iowa	Rushing	Tyler Goodson	16 carries, 77 yards
Iowa	Receiving	Sam LaPorta	5 receptions, 71 yards
Purdue	Passing	Aidan O'Connell	31–50, 282 yards, 3 TD, 2 INT
Purdue	Rushing	Zander Horvath	21 carries, 129 yards
Purdue	Receiving	David Bell	13 receptions, 121 yards, 3 TD

=== Northwestern ===
Northwestern at Iowa
Homecoming

Team	1	2	3	4	Total
• Wildcats	0	14	7	0	21
Hawkeyes	17	3	0	0	20

- Date: October 31
- Location:
  Kinnick Stadium
  Iowa City, IA
- Game start: 2:35 p.m. CDT
- Elapsed time: 3:16
- Game attendance: 1,432
- Game weather: 61 °F (16 °C), Clear and Sunny, Wind 15–20 mph (24–32 km/h)
- Referee: Larry Smith
- TV announcers (ESPN): Bob Wischusen, Dan Orlovsky and Allison Williams
- Source: Box Score

Scoring summary
1	11:36	Iowa	Brandon Smith 7-yard pass from Spencer Petras (Keith Duncan kick)	Iowa 7–0
1	8:36	Iowa	Tyler Goodson 15-yard run (Keith Duncan kick)	Iowa 14–0
1	1:43	Iowa	Keith Duncan 22-yard field goal	Iowa 17–0
2	10:20	NW	Kyric McGowan 3-yard run (Charlie Kuhbander kick)	Iowa 17–7
2	7:09	Iowa	Keith Duncan 47-yard field goal	Iowa 20–7
2	1:25	NW	Jesse Brown 1-yard run (Charlie Kuhbander kick)	Iowa 20–14
3	6:05	NW	Jesse Brown 2-yard run (Charlie Kuhbander kick)	NW 21–20

Statistics	NW	IOWA
First downs	18	20
Total yards	273	293
Rushing yards	143	77
Passing yards	130	216
Turnovers	1	3
Time of possession	33:33	26:27

Team	Category	Player	Statistics
Northwestern	Passing	Peyton Ramsey	11–18, 130 yards, INT
Northwestern	Rushing	Isaiah Bowser	25 carries, 85 yards
Northwestern	Receiving	Kyric McGowan	5 receptions, 63 yards
Iowa	Passing	Spencer Petras	26–50, 216 yards, TD, 3 INT
Iowa	Rushing	Tyler Goodson	13 carries, 43 yards, TD
Iowa	Receiving	Ihmir Smith-Marsette	7 receptions, 84 yards

=== Michigan State ===
Michigan State at Iowa

Team	1	2	3	4	Total
Spartans	0	0	7	0	7
• Hawkeyes	14	21	7	7	49

- Date: November 7
- Location:
  Kinnick Stadium
  Iowa City, IA
- Game start: 11:02 a.m. CST
- Elapsed time: 3:20
- Game attendance: 1,441
- Game weather: 66 °F (19 °C), Sunny, Wind S 12 mph (19 km/h)
- Referee: Ron Snodgrass
- TV announcers (ESPN): Bob Wischusen, Dan Orlovsky, and Paul Carcaterra
- Source: Box Score

Scoring summary
1	11:07	Iowa	Tyler Goodson 3-yard run (Keith Duncan kick)	Iowa 7–0
1	4:31	Iowa	Brandon Smith 14-yard pass from Spencer Petras (Keith Duncan kick)	Iowa 14–0
2	11:16	Iowa	Tyler Goodson 9-yard run (Keith Duncan kick)	Iowa 21–0
2	1:57	Iowa	Charlie Jones 54-yard punt return (Keith Duncan kick)	Iowa 28–0
2	1:30	Iowa	Riley Moss 54-yard interception return (Keith Duncan kick)	Iowa 35–0
3	10:06	MSU	Tyler Hunt 1-yard run (Matt Coghlin kick)	Iowa 35–7
3	8:47	Iowa	Mekhi Sargent 2-yard run (Keith Duncan kick)	Iowa 42–7
4	11:57	Iowa	Mekhi Sargent 6-yard run (Keith Duncan kick)	Iowa 49–7

Iowa's first win over Michigan State since 2012, and the Hawkeyes' largest in the 48-game series, gave Kirk Ferentz his 163rd win as coach, passing Joe Paterno in total wins as a Big Ten head coach. The Hawkeyes dominated in all three phases of the game and gave Spartan quarterback Rocky Lombardi a long day, intercepting him three times.

Statistics	MSU	IOWA
First downs	10	19
Total yards	286	405
Rushing yards	59	226
Passing yards	227	179
Turnovers	3	0
Time of possession	27:55	32:05

Team	Category	Player	Statistics
Michigan State	Passing	Rocky Lombardi	17–37, 227 yards, 3 INT
Michigan State	Rushing	Jordan Simmons	9 carries, 34 yards
Michigan State	Receiving	Jalen Nailor	4 receptions, 119 yards
Iowa	Passing	Spencer Petras	15–27, 167 yards, TD
Iowa	Rushing	Tyler Goodson	14 carries, 113 yards, 2 TD
Iowa	Receiving	Tyrone Tracy	4 receptions, 38 yards

=== At Minnesota ===
Iowa at Minnesota
Floyd of Rosedale

Team	1	2	3	4	Total
• Hawkeyes	7	7	0	21	35
Golden Gophers	0	0	0	7	7

- Date: November 13
- Location:
  TCF Bank Stadium
  Minneapolis, MN
- Game start: 6:05 p.m. CST
- Elapsed time: 3:14
- Game attendance: 771
- Game weather: 33 °F (1 °C), Sunny, Wind SE 12 mph (19 km/h)
- Referee: Reggie Smith
- TV announcers (FS1): Aaron Goldsmith and Brady Quinn
- Source: Box Score

Scoring summary
1	5:42	Iowa	Nico Ragiani 1-yard run (Keith Duncan kick)	Iowa 7–0
2	8:31	Iowa	Tyler Goodson 7-yard run (Keith Duncan kick)	Iowa 14–0
4	13:12	Iowa	Ihmir Smith-Marsette 7-yard pass from Spencer Petras (PAT failed)	Iowa 20–0
4	8:56	Iowa	Tyler Goodson 1-yard run (Tyler Goodson run)	Iowa 28–0
4	6:37	Iowa	Mekhi Sargent 14-yard run (Keith Duncan kick)	Iowa 35–0
4	0:14	Minn	Rashod Bateman 4-yard pass from Tanner Morgan (Michael Lantz kick)	Iowa 35–7

Iowa has won eight of the last nine meetings in this series. The Hawkeyes dominated the Golden Gophers, winning for the third straight time in Minneapolis, to keep Floyd of Rosedale in Iowa City for a sixth straight year.

Statistics	IOWA	MINN
First downs	20	19
Total yards	346	312
Rushing yards	235	145
Passing yards	111	167
Turnovers	1	2
Time of possession	23:50	36:10

Team	Category	Player	Statistics
Iowa	Passing	Spencer Petras	9–18, 111 yards, TD, INT
Iowa	Rushing	Tyler Goodson	20 carries, 142 yards, 2 TD
Iowa	Receiving	Tyrone Tracy	3 receptions, 36 yards
Minnesota	Passing	Tanner Morgan	16–33, 167 yards, TD, 2 INT
Minnesota	Rushing	Mohamed Ibrahim	33 carries, 144 yards
Minnesota	Receiving	Rashod Bateman	8 receptions, 111 yards, TD

=== At Penn State ===
Iowa at Penn State

Team	1	2	3	4	Total
• Hawkeyes	3	21	7	10	41
Nittany Lions	7	0	14	0	21

- Date: November 21
- Location:
  Beaver Stadium
  University Park, PA
- Game start: 3:30 EST
- Elapsed time: 3:26
- Game attendance: 1,500
- Game weather: 54 °F (12 °C), Cloudy, rain, Wind NW 7 mph (11 km/h)
- Referee: Mark Kluczynski
- TV announcers (BTN): Joe Beninati, Matt Millen, and Rick Pizzo
- Source: Box Score

Scoring summary
1	8:23	Iowa	Keith Duncan 40-yard field goal	Iowa 3–0
1	2:12	PSU	Keyvone Lee 6-yard run (Jake Pinegar kick)	Penn State 7–3
2	14:35	Iowa	Tyler Goodson 10-yard run (Keith Duncan kick)	Iowa 10–7
2	6:34	Iowa	Mekhi Sargent 1-yard run (Keith Duncan kick)	Iowa 17–7
2	0:11	Iowa	Mekhi Sargent 1-yard run (Keith Duncan kick)	Iowa 24–7
3	6:45	Iowa	Spencer Petras 3-yard run (Keith Duncan kick)	Iowa 31–7
3	4:01	PSU	Brenton Strange 28-yard pass from Sean Clifford (kick blocked)	Iowa 31–13
3	0:07	PSU	Jahan Dotson 68-yard pass from Sean Clifford (Keyvone Lee pass from S. Clifford)	Iowa 31–21
4	7:14	Iowa	Keith Duncan 24-yard field goal	Iowa 34–21
4	1:58	Iowa	Daviyon Nixon 71-yard interception return (Keith Duncan kick)	Iowa 41–21

Iowa earned their first win over Penn State since 2010, forcing four turnovers in the process. The victory gave Kirk Ferentz his 100th Big Ten win – just the 4th coach in conference history to achieve the feat – and Penn State their first-ever 0–5 start in the program's 134-year history.

Statistics	IOWA	PSU
First downs	24	19
Total yards	361	342
Rushing yards	175	62
Passing yards	186	280
Turnovers	1	4
Time of possession	31:50	28:10

Team	Category	Player	Statistics
Iowa	Passing	Spencer Petras	18/28, 186 yards
Iowa	Rushing	Mekhi Sargent	15 carries, 101 yards, 2 TD
Iowa	Receiving	Nico Ragaini	4 receptions, 46 yards
Penn State	Passing	Sean Clifford	13/22, 174 yards, 2 TD, 2 INT
Penn State	Rushing	Will Levis	15 carries, 34 yards
Penn State	Receiving	Jahan Dotson	8 receptions, 139 yards, TD

=== Nebraska ===
Nebraska at No. 24 Iowa
Heroes Trophy

Team	1	2	3	4	Total
Cornhuskers	0	13	7	0	20
• No. 24 Hawkeyes	10	3	7	6	26

- Date: November 28
- Location:
  Kinnick Stadium
  Iowa City, IA
- Game start: 12:00 p.m. CST
- Elapsed time: 3:16
- Game attendance: 1,469
- Game weather: 40 °F (4 °C), Partly cloudy, Wind NW 11 mph (18 km/h)
- Referee: Ron Snodgrass
- TV announcers (FOX): Brian Custer, Robert Smith
- Source: Box Score

Scoring summary
1	12:06	Iowa	Keith Duncan 32-yard field goal	Iowa 3–0
1	1:09	Iowa	Tyrone Tracy 6-yard pass from Spencer Petras (Keith Duncan kick)	Iowa 10–0
2	12:35	Neb	Connor Culp 31-yard field goal	Iowa 10–3
2	9:42	Neb	Connor Culp 39-yard field goal	Iowa 10–6
2	3:48	Iowa	Keith Duncan 33-yard field goal	Iowa 13–6
2	0:29	Neb	Adrian Martinez 1-yard run (Connor Culp kick)	Tied 13–13
3	12:05	Neb	Rahmir Johnson 12-yard run (Connor Culp kick)	Neb 20–13
3	5:47	Iowa	Mekhi Sargent 2-yard run (Keith Duncan kick)	Tied 20–20
4	14:55	Iowa	Keith Duncan 48-yard field goal	Iowa 23–20
4	8:21	Iowa	Keith Duncan 37-yard field goal	Iowa 26–20

Iowa was victorious for the sixth straight time – and seventh in eight meetings – against Nebraska. In this back-and-forth game, turnovers in the fourth quarter hurt the Cornhuskers, as they fumbled twice in the last 10:17. The second of which was forced by Chauncey Golston to keep the Heroes Trophy in Iowa City. Senior Keith Duncan kicked four field goals in a game for the fourth time in his career, joining Nate Kaeding as the only Hawkeye kickers to achieve the feat.

Statistics	NEB	IOWA
First downs	20	22
Total yards	338	322
Rushing yards	143	129
Passing yards	195	193
Turnovers	2	1
Time of possession	25:36	34:24

Team	Category	Player	Statistics
Nebraska	Passing	Adrian Martinez	18/20, 174 yards
Nebraska	Rushing	Wan'Dale Robinson; Luke McCaffrey	6 carries, 42 yards 5 carries, 42 yards
Nebraska	Receiving	Wan'Dale Robinson	9 receptions, 75 yards
Iowa	Passing	Spencer Petras	18/30, 193 yards, TD, INT
Iowa	Rushing	Tyler Goodson	30 carries, 111 yards
Iowa	Receiving	Sam LaPorta	5 receptions, 38 yards

=== At Illinois ===
Iowa at Illinois

Team	1	2	3	4	Total
• No. 19 Hawkeyes	0	13	8	14	35
Fighting Illini	7	7	0	7	21

- Date: December 5
- Location:
  Memorial Stadium
  Champaign, IL
- Game start: 2:40 p.m. CST
- Elapsed time: 3:19
- Game attendance: 875
- Game weather: 44 °F (7 °C), Sunny, Wind NE 5 mph (8.0 km/h)
- Referee: Jerry McGinn
- TV announcers (FS1): Eric Collins and Ben Leber
- Source: Box Score

Scoring summary
1	8:10	Illinois	Daniel Barker 24-yard pass from Brandon Peters (James McCourt kick)	Illinois 7–0
2	13:30	Illinois	Josh Imatorbhebhe 12-yard pass from Brandon Peters (James McCourt kick)	Illinois 14–0
2	6:18	Iowa	Sam LaPorta 22-yard pass from Spencer Petras (Keith Duncan kick)	Illinois 14–7
2	2:54	Iowa	Keith Duncan 40-yard field goal	Illinois 14–10
2	0:14	Iowa	Keith Duncan 27-yard field goal	Illinois 14–13
3	8:24	Iowa	Ihmir Smith-Marsette 4-yard pass from Spencer Petras (Tyler Goodson pass from Petras)	Iowa 21–14
4	12:40	Iowa	Shaun Beyer 16-yard pass from Spencer Petras (Keith Duncan kick)	Iowa 28–14
4	1:56	Iowa	Ihmir Smith-Marsette 13-yard run (Keith Duncan kick)	Iowa 35–14
4	0:24	Illinois	Carlos Sandy 29-yard pass from Isaiah Williams (James McCourt kick)	Iowa 35–21

Iowa hasn't lost to Illinois since 2008. This was their seventh straight victory in the series and have won 12 of the last 13 overall. Illinois jumped out to a 14–0 lead early but the Hawkeyes put up 35 unanswered points and controlled the line of scrimmage from that point on having the ability to both run and pass the ball effectively.

Statistics	IOWA	ILL
First downs	22	20
Total yards	424	348
Rushing yards	204	149
Passing yards	220	199
Turnovers	0	0
Time of possession	30:26	29:34

Team	Category	Player	Statistics
Iowa	Passing	Spencer Petras	18/28, 220 yards, 3 TD
Iowa	Rushing	Tyler Goodson	19 carries, 92 yards
Iowa	Receiving	Brandon Smith	5 receptions, 58 yards
Illinois	Passing	Brandon Peters	10/18, 116 yards, 2 TD
Illinois	Rushing	Chase Brown	18 carries, 83 yards
Illinois	Receiving	Josh Imatorbhebhe	4 receptions, 48 yards, TD

=== Wisconsin ===
Wisconsin at Iowa
Heartland Trophy

Team	1	2	3	4	Total
Badgers	0	0	7	0	7
• No. 16 Hawkeyes	3	3	15	7	28

- Date: December 12
- Location:
  Kinnick Stadium
  Iowa City, IA
- Game start: 2:40 p.m. CST
- Elapsed time: 3:16
- Game attendance: 1,445
- Game weather: 33 °F (1 °C), Overcast, Snow, Wind 10 mph (16 km/h)
- Referee: Larry Smith
- TV announcers (FS1): Tim Brando and Spencer Tillman

Scoring summary
1	7:12	Iowa	Keith Duncan 40-yard field goal	Iowa 3–0
2	0:01	Iowa	Keith Duncan 45-yard field goal	Iowa 6–0
3	8:49	Iowa	Ihmir Smith-Marsette 19-yard pass from Spencer Petras (Brandon Smith pass from Petras)	Iowa 14–0
3	5:42	Wisc	Nakia Watson 1-yard run (Collin Larsh kick)	Iowa 14–7
3	1:23	Iowa	Ihmir Smith-Marsette 53-yard pass from Spencer Petras (Keith Duncan kick)	Iowa 21–7
4	4:09	Iowa	Tyler Goodson 80-yard run (Keith Duncan kick)	Iowa 28–7

Iowa won at home over Wisconsin for the first time since 2008 to recapture the bull. After a slow start on the snow-covered field in the first half, the Hawkeyes put up three touchdowns in the second, and were able to stop the Badgers on several fourth down attempts.

Statistics	WIS	IOWA
First downs	11	13
Total yards	225	338
Rushing yards	56	127
Passing yards	169	211
Turnovers	2	1
Time of possession	34:11	25:49

Team	Category	Player	Statistics
Wisconsin	Passing	Graham Mertz	20/38, 169 yards, INT
Wisconsin	Rushing	Nakia Watson	13 carries, 29 yards, TD
Wisconsin	Receiving	Jack Dunn	5 receptions, 55 yards
Iowa	Passing	Spencer Petras	14/25, 211 yards, 2 TD
Iowa	Rushing	Tyler Goodson	11 carries, 106 yards, TD
Iowa	Receiving	Ihmir Smith-Marsette	7 receptions, 140 yards, 2 TD

=== Michigan ===
Michigan at Iowa
Champions Week

Team	1	2	Total
Wolverines			0
No. 16 Hawkeyes			0

- Date: December 19
- Location:
  Kinnick Stadium
  Iowa City, IA
- Game start: 6:00 p.m. CST
- Television network: ESPN

Iowa was looking to avenge a loss in Ann Arbor from previous season, but it was announced on December 15 the game was canceled due to COVID-19 issues within the Wolverines program.

=== Vs. Missouri (Music City Bowl) ===
Iowa vs. Missouri
Music City Bowl

Team	1	2	Total
No. 15 Hawkeyes			0
Tigers			0

- Date: December 30
- Location:
  Nissan Stadium
  Nashville, TN
- Game start: 3:00 p.m. CST
- Television network: ESPN

Due to a COVID-19 outbreak within the Tigers' football program, the Music City Bowl was canceled, ending the season for both the Hawkeyes and the Tigers.

Had the game been played, it would have been the first meeting between Iowa and Missouri in a decade. If Iowa had won the game, it would have given Kirk Ferentz his 10th bowl win, which would have tied Joe Paterno for first all-time in Big 10 history.

== Awards and honors ==
Individual Awards
Player	Award	Ref.
Daviyon Nixon	Nagurski–Woodson Defensive Player of the Year; Smith–Brown Defensive Lineman of the Year	
Tory Taylor	Eddleman–Fields Punter of the Year	

== Players drafted into the NFL ==
Round	Pick	Player	Position	NFL Club
3	84	Chauncey Golston	DE	Dallas Cowboys
5	157	Ihmir Smith-Marsette	WR	Minnesota Vikings
5	158	Daviyon Nixon	DT	Carolina Panthers
6	185	Nick Niemann	ILB	Los Angeles Chargers
