= 2020 Wisconsin Badgers football team =

American college football season

2020 Wisconsin Badgers football

Duke's Mayo Bowl champion

Duke's Mayo Bowl, W 42–28 vs. Wake Forest
- Conference: Big Ten Conference
- West Division
- Record: 4–3 (3–3 Big Ten)
- Head coach: Paul Chryst (6th season)
- Offensive coordinator: Joe Rudolph (6th season)
- Offensive scheme: Pro-style
- Defensive coordinator: Jim Leonhard (4th season)
- Base defense: 3–4
- Captain: Garrett Groshek
- Home stadium: Camp Randall Stadium

Uniform
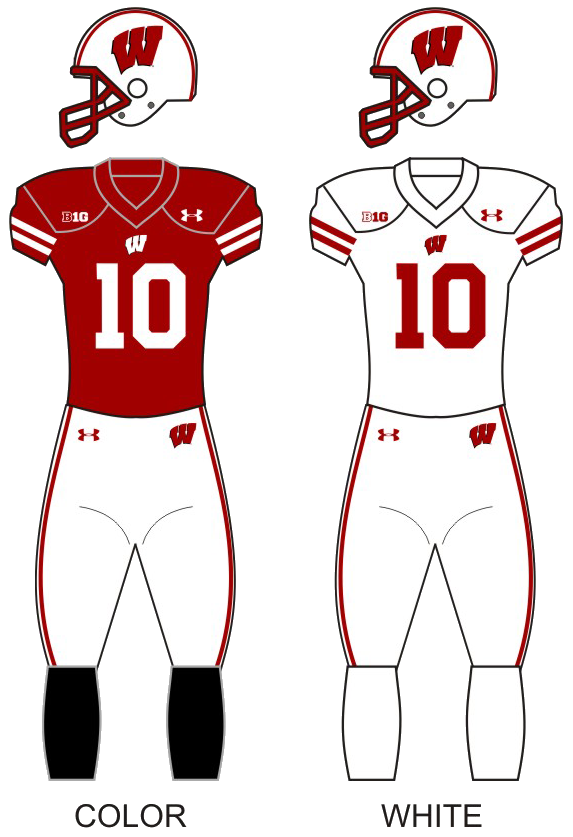

2020 Big Ten Conference football standings
	Conf.			Overall
Team	W		L	W		L
East Division
No. 2 Ohio State xy$^	5	–	0	7	–	1
No. 12 Indiana	6	–	1	6	–	2
Penn State	4	–	5	4	–	5
Maryland	2	–	3	2	–	3
Rutgers	3	–	6	3	–	6
Michigan	2	–	4	2	–	4
Michigan State	2	–	5	2	–	5
West Division
No. 10 Northwestern xy	6	–	1	7	–	2
No. 16 Iowa	6	–	2	6	–	2
Wisconsin	3	–	3	4	–	3
Minnesota	3	–	4	3	–	4
Nebraska	3	–	5	3	–	5
Purdue	2	–	4	2	–	4
Illinois	2	–	6	2	–	6
Championship: Ohio State 22, Northwestern 10
^ – College Football Playoff participant; $ – Conference champion; x – Division champion/co-champions; y – Championship game participant; Note: Due to COVID-19, the Big Ten suspended the season on August 11, but later decided to begin play on October 24. In addition to the title game that was played on December 19, the conference seeded all remaining teams for "championship week" games.; Rankings from AP Poll.

The 2020 Wisconsin Badgers football team represented the University of Wisconsin–Madison in the 2020 NCAA Division I FBS football season. The Badgers were led by sixth-year head coach Paul Chryst and competed as members of the West Division of the Big Ten Conference. They played their home games at Camp Randall Stadium in Madison, Wisconsin.

On August 11, 2020, the Big Ten Conference suspended all fall sports competitions due to the COVID-19 pandemic. However, on September 16, the Big Ten reinstated the season, announcing an eight-game season beginning on October 24.

== Offseason ==
=== 2020 NFL draft ===
Round	Pick	Player	Position	NFL Club
2	41	Jonathan Taylor	RB	Indianapolis Colts
3	74	Zack Baun	LB	New Orleans Saints
4	146	Tyler Biadasz	C	Dallas Cowboys
5	166	Quintez Cephus	WR	Detroit Lions
Undrafted		Chris Orr	LB	Carolina Panthers

=== Transfers ===
Name	Number	Pos.	Height	Weight	Year	Hometown	Transfer to
Bradrick Shaw	#7	RB	6'1	205	Senior (redshirt)	Hoover, AL	California
Aron Cruickshank	#1	WR	5'9	155	Sophomore	Brooklyn, NY	Rutgers
Seth Currens	#10	ILB	6'3	230	Junior (redshirt)	Pickerington, OH	Miami (OH)
Christian Bell	#49	OLB	6'4	246	Senior (redshirt)	Hoover, AL	South Alabama
Griffin Grady	#47	OLB	6'2	205	Sophomore (redshirt)	Dublin, OH	-

== Preseason ==
=== Spring game ===
The Badgers spring scrimmage and practice on April 18, 2020 was canceled due to the COVID-19 pandemic.

=== Award watch lists ===
Listed in the order that they were released

Award	Player	Position	Year
Davey O'Brien Award	Jack Coan	QB	SR
Chuck Bednarik Award	Jack Sanborn	LB	JR
Doak Walker Award	Nakia Watson	RB	SO
John Mackey Award	Jake Ferguson	TE	JR
Butkus Award	Jack Sanborn	LB	JR
Jim Thorpe Award	Eric Burrell	S	SR
Outland Trophy	Cole Van Lanen	OL	SR
Manning Award	Jack Coan	QB	SR
Maxwell Award	Jack Coan	QB	SR
Wuerffel Trophy	Madison Cone	S	SR
Bronko Nagurski Trophy	Eric Burrell	S	SR

=== Preseason Big Ten poll ===
Although the Big Ten Conference has not held an official preseason poll since 2010, Cleveland.com has polled sports journalists representing all member schools as a de facto preseason media poll since 2011. For the 2020 poll, Wisconsin was projected to finish first in the West Division.

== Schedule ==
=== Games canceled due to COVID-19 pandemic ===
The Badgers 2020 schedule originally consisted of six home games, four away games, and two neutral site games. The Badgers would have hosted two of its three non-conference games at Camp Randall; the first on September 12 against Southern Illinois from the Missouri Valley, then the next week on September 19, playing Appalachian State, a member of the Sun Belt Conference. The last non-conference matchup on October 3 was a primetime game guaranteed to air on NBC against Notre Dame as part of the Fighting Irish's neutral-site Shamrock Series at Lambeau Field in Green Bay, with Notre Dame as the designated home team.

The Big Ten Conference canceled all non-conference games on July 9 due to the COVID-19 pandemic; the day before, the November 7 away game at Northwestern was moved from the neutral site Wrigley Field in Chicago back to Ryan Field in Evanston. Both Notre Dame and Wisconsin plan to fulfill their contract and play the Lambeau Field game in a subsequent season.

On November 25, Wisconsin's game vs. Minnesota was canceled, leaving the team with only 5 games maximum and thus making the Badgers no longer eligible for the 2020 Big Ten Football Championship Game.

=== Original schedule ===
Original 2020 Wisconsin Badgers schedule
Date	Opponent	Site
September 4	Indiana	Camp Randall Stadium • Madison, WI
September 12	Southern Illinois*	Camp Randall Stadium • Madison, WI
September 19	Appalachian State*	Camp Randall Stadium • Madison, WI
September 26	at Michigan	Michigan Stadium • Ann Arbor, MI
October 3	vs. Notre Dame*	Lambeau Field • Green Bay, WI (Shamrock Series)
October 10	Minnesota	Camp Randall Stadium • Madison, WI (Paul Bunyan's Axe)
October 24	at Maryland	Maryland Stadium • College Park, MD
October 31	Illinois	Camp Randall Stadium • Madison, WI
November 7	at Northwestern	Wrigley Field • Chicago, IL
November 14	at Purdue	Ross-Ade Stadium • West Lafayette, IN
November 21	Nebraska	Camp Randall Stadium • Madison, WI
November 28	at Iowa	Kinnick Stadium • Iowa City, IA (Heartland Trophy)

=== Current schedule ===
In Big Ten Conference play, Wisconsin will play all members of the West Division, and draws Indiana, and Michigan from the East Division.

Date	Time	Opponent	Rank	Site	TV	Result	Attendance
October 23	7:00 p.m.	Illinois	No. 14	Camp Randall Stadium; Madison, WI	BTN	W 45–7	0
October 31	2:30 p.m.	at Nebraska	No. 9	Memorial Stadium; Lincoln, NE (Freedom Trophy)	FS1	No Contest	–
November 7	2:30 p.m.	Purdue	No. 10	Camp Randall Stadium; Madison, WI	ABC	No Contest	–
November 14	6:30 p.m.	at Michigan	No. 13	Michigan Stadium; Ann Arbor, MI	ABC	W 49–11	605
November 21	2:30 p.m.	at No. 19 Northwestern	No. 10	Ryan Field; Evanston, IL	ABC	L 7–17	0
November 28	1:00 p.m.	Minnesota	No. 16	Camp Randall Stadium; Madison, WI (Paul Bunyan's Axe)	BTN	Rescheduled	–
December 5	2:30 p.m.	No. 12 Indiana	No. 16	Camp Randall Stadium; Madison, WI	ABC	L 6–14	0
December 12	2:30 p.m.	at No. 16 Iowa		Kinnick Stadium; Iowa City, IA (Heartland Trophy)	FS1	L 7–28	1,445
December 19	3:00 p.m.	Minnesota		Camp Randall Stadium; Madison, WI (Paul Bunyan's Axe)	BTN	W 20–17 ^{OT}	0
December 30	11:00 a.m.	vs. Wake Forest*		Bank of America Stadium; Charlotte, NC (Duke's Mayo Bowl)	ESPN	W 42–28	1,500
*Non-conference game; Rankings from AP Poll and CFP Rankings (after November 24) released prior to game; All times are in Central time

*Wisconsin's game with Nebraska was canceled due to a COVID-19 outbreak at Wisconsin. The game will not be rescheduled. Instead, both teams will have a bye and will have just seven games.

*Wisconsin's game with Purdue was cancelled due to a COVID-19 outbreak at Wisconsin. The game will not be rescheduled. Instead, Wisconsin will have a bye and will have just six games, and Purdue will have a bye and will have just seven games.

*Wisconsin's game with Minnesota was initially cancelled due to a COVID-19 outbreak at Wisconsin. The game was eventually rescheduled for Big Ten Championship weekend.

== Roster ==
2020 Wisconsin Badgers football team roster
Players
Coaches
Offense

Pos.	#	Name	Class
QB	2	Chase Wolf	So
WR	3	Kendric Pryor	Sr
QB	5	Graham Mertz	Fr
WR	7	Danny Davis III	Sr
RB	8	Jalen Berger	Fr
RB	10	Isaac Guerendo	So
WR	11	Stephan Bracey	Fr
QB	12	Daniel Wright	Fr
WR	13	Chimere Dike	Fr
WR	13	Mike Gregoire	So
WR	14	Jordan DiBenedetto	Fr
QB	15	Danny Vanden Boom	Jr
WR	16	Jack Dunn	Sr
QB	17	Jack Coan	Sr
WR	18	Cam Phillips	Fr
WR	21	Cooper Nelson	Fr
WR	22	Cade Green	Jr
WR	24	Haakon Anderson	Fr
WR	24	Adam Krumholz	Sr
WR	25	Isaac Smith	Fr
RB	25	Nakia Watson	So
FB	28	Quan Easterling	Fr
RB	29	Brady Schipper	So
TE	30	Coy Wanner	Jr
RB	32	Julius Davis	Fr
FB	34	Mason Stokke	Sr
RB	36	Hunter Johnson	Jr
RB	37	Garrett Groshek	Sr
TE	41	Jack Eschenbach	So
TE	43	Hayden Rucci	Fr
FB	44	John Chenal	Jr
TE	46	Gabe Lloyd	Sr
TE	47	Clay Cundiff	Fr
TE	49	Cam Large	Fr
OL	50	Logan Brown	Fr
OL	59	Andrew Lyons	So
OL	60	Logan Bruss	Jr
OL	61	Dylan Barrett	Fr
OL	62	Logan O'Brien	Fr
OL	64	Sean Timmis	Fr
OL	65	Tyler Beach	Jr
OL	66	Tanor Bortolini	Fr
OL	67	Cormac Sampson	So
OL	68	Ben Barten	Fr
OL	69	Aaron Vopal	Jr
OL	70	Josh Seltzner	Jr
OL	71	Cole Van Lanen	Sr
OL	73	Kerry Kodanko	Fr
OL	73	Alex Fenton	Jr
OL	74	Michael Furtney	So
OL	75	Joe Tippmann	Fr
OL	76	Kayden Lyles	Jr
OL	77	Blake Smithback	Jr
OL	78	Trey Wedig	Fr
OL	79	Jack Nelson	Fr
WR	81	Taj Mustapha	So
WR	82	Emmet Perry	Jr
TE	84	Jake Ferguson	Jr
WR	86	Devin Chandler	Fr
TE	86	Luke Benzschawel	Sr
WR	89	A.J. Abbott	So

Defense

Pos.	#	Name	Class
CB	1	Faion Hicks	Jr
S	2	Reggie Pearson	So
CB	4	Donte Burton	So
CB	5	Rachad Wildgoose	Jr
CB	6	Dean Engram	Fr
OLB	7	Spencer Lytle	Fr
CB	8	Deron Harrell	Jr
S	9	Scott Nelson	Jr
CB	11	Alexander Smith	So
S	12	Titus Toler	Fr
CB	16	Amaun Williams	Fr
CB	17	Max Lofy	Fr
S	18	Collin Wilder	Sr
OLB	19	Nick Herbig	Fr
S	19	John Torchio	So
CB	20	Semar Melvin	Fr
CB	21	Caesar Williams	Sr
ILB	22	Jacob Heyroth	So
CB	24	James Williams	Fr
S	25	Eric Burrell	Sr
CB	26	Travian Blaylock	So
CB	27	Cristian Volpentesta	Sr
ILB	29	Jackson Kollath	Fr
S	30	Tyler Mais	Jr
S	31	Madison Cone	Sr
ILB	32	Marty Strey	So
ILB	34	Ross Gengler	Fr
CB	36	Kobe Knaak	Sr
OLB	37	Riley Nowakowski	Fr
S	38	Dante Caputo	Fr
ILB	39	Tatum Grass	Fr
OLB	41	Noah Burks	Sr
OLB	42	Jaylan Franklin	So
OLB	43	Preston Zachman	Fr
ILB	45	Leo Chenal	So
OLB	46	Hegeman Tiedt	Sr
OLB	48	Cole Dakovich	Fr
OLB	50	Izayah Green-May	Jr
DE	51	Giovanni Paez	Fr
OLB	52	Kaden Johnson	Fr
OLB	53	Malik Reed	Fr
ILB	54	Jordan Turner	Fr
ILB	55	Maema Njongmeta	Fr
DE	56	Rodas Johnson	Fr
DE	57	Michael Balistreri	Jr
ILB	57	Jack Sanborn	Jr
ILB	58	Mike Maskalunas	Sr
DE	59	Aaron Witt	Fr
DE	90	Isaiah Mullens	So
DE	90	James Thompson Jr.	Fr
NT	91	Bryson Williams	Jr
DE	92	Matt Henningsen	Jr
DE	93	Garrett Rand	Sr
DE	94	Boyd Dietzen	So
NT	95	Keeanu Benton	So
DE	96	Cade McDonald	Fr
DE	97	Isaiahh Loudermilk	Sr
DE	98	C.J. Goetz	So

Special teams

Pos.	#	Name	Class
K	19	Collin Larsh	Jr
P	26	Jack Van Dyke	Fr
P	28	Gavin Meyers	Fr
K	28	Blake Wilcox	Fr
P	38	Andy Vujnovich	Jr
LS	51	Adam Bay	Sr
LS	52	Josh Bernhagen	Sr
LS	63	Peter Bowden	Fr
LS	64	Duncan McKinley	Fr
P	96	Conor Schlichting	Jr

Head coach

- Paul Chryst (Wisconsin)

Coordinators/assistant coaches

- Joe Rudolph (Wisconsin)
  Associate head coach, offensive coordinator, offensive line
- Jim Leonhard (Wisconsin)
  Defensive coordinator, defensive backs
- Bobby April (Louisiana-Lafayette)
  Outside linebackers
- Bob Bostad (Wisconsin–Stevens Point)
  Inside linebackers
- Inoke Breckterfield (Oregon State)
  Defensive line
- Jon Budmayr (Wisconsin)
  Quarterbacks
- Alvis Whitted (NC State)
  Wide receivers
- Chris Haering (West Virginia)
  Special teams
- John Settle (Appalachian State)
  Running backs
- Mickey Turner (Wisconsin)
  Tight ends
- Ross Kolodziej (Wisconsin)
  Head strength and conditioning coach

Legend

- (C) Team captain
- (S) Suspended
- (I) Ineligible
- Injured
- Redshirt

Roster
Last update: November 19, 2019

== Rankings ==
Ranking movements Legend: ██ Increase in ranking ██ Decrease in ranking — = Not ranked
	Week																	
Poll	Pre	1	2	3	4	5	6	7	8	9	10	11	12	13	14	15	16	Final
AP	12	12*	—	—	19	16	9	10	13	10	18	18	18	18	25	—		
Coaches	12	12*	—	17	18	14	11	11	14	12	20	19	20	19	25	—		
CFP	Not released												16	16	—	—		Not released

== Game summaries ==
=== Illinois ===
	1	2	3	4	Total
Fighting Illini	0	7	0	0	7
No. 14 Badgers	7	21	0	17	45

=== At Nebraska (Cancelled) ===
	1	2	3	4	Total
~~No. 9 Badgers~~	0	0	0	0	0
~~Cornhuskers~~	0	0	0	0	0

The Wisconsin at Nebraska game was canceled due to a COVID-19 outbreak at Wisconsin. The game will not be rescheduled. Instead, both teams will have a bye and will play just seven games.

=== Purdue (Cancelled) ===
	1	2	3	4	Total
~~Boilermakers~~	0	0	0	0	0
~~No. 10 Badgers~~	0	0	0	0	0

The Purdue at Wisconsin game was canceled due to a COVID-19 outbreak at Wisconsin. The game will not be rescheduled.

=== At Michigan ===
	1	2	3	4	Total
No. 13 Badgers	14	14	7	14	49
Wolverines	0	0	11	0	11

=== At Northwestern ===
	1	2	3	4	Total
No. 10 Badgers	7	0	0	0	7
No. 19 Wildcats	7	7	0	3	17

=== Minnesota (Rescheduled) ===
	1	2	3	4	Total
~~Golden Gophers~~	0	0	0	0	0
~~No. 16 Badgers~~	0	0	0	0	0

The Minnesota at Wisconsin game was canceled due to a COVID-19 outbreak at Minnesota. The game was rescheduled for December 19 at 3:00 p.m..

=== Indiana ===
	1	2	3	4	Total
Hoosiers	0	7	7	0	14
Badgers	0	3	3	0	6

=== At Iowa ===
	1	2	3	4	Total
Badgers	0	0	7	0	7
Hawkeyes	3	3	15	7	28

=== Minnesota ===
	1	2	3	4	OT	Total
Golden Gophers	7	0	3	7	0	17
Badgers	0	7	7	3	3	20

=== Vs. Wake Forest (Duke's Mayo Bowl) ===
	1	2	3	4	Total
Demon Deacons	14	0	7	7	28
Badgers	0	14	14	14	42

== Awards and honors ==
Weekly Awards
Player	Award	Date awarded	Ref.
Graham Mertz	Big Ten Co-offensive Player of the Week	October 23, 2019	
Graham Mertz	Big Ten Freshman Player of the Week	October 23, 2019	

Individual Awards
Player	Award	Ref.
Cole Van Lanen	First Team All-Big Ten Offense (Coaches)/Second Team All-Big Ten Offense (Media)	
Jake Ferguson	First Team All-Big Ten Offense (Media)/Second Team All-Big Ten Offense (Coaches)	
Logan Bruss	Third Team All-Big Ten Offense (Coaches/Media)	
Caesar Williams	Third Team All-Big Ten Defense (Coaches)/Honorable Mention Defense (Media)	
Isaiahh Loudermilk	Third Team All-Big Ten Defense (Media)/Honorable Mention Defense (Coaches)	
Jack Sanborn	Third Team All-Big Ten Defense (Media)/Honorable Mention Defense (Coaches)	
Mason Stokke	Honorable Mention Offense (Coaches)	
Tyler Beach	Honorable Mention Offense (Coaches)	
Leo Chenal	Honorable Mention Defense (Coaches/Media)	
Eric Burrell	Honorable Mention Defense (Coaches/Media)	
Faion Hicks	Honorable Mention Defense (Coaches/Media)	
Andy Vujnovich	Honorable Mention Special Teams (Coaches)	

== Players drafted into the NFL ==
Round	Pick	Player	Position	NFL Club
5	156	Isaiahh Loudermilk	DE	Pittsburgh Steelers
6	213	Rachad Wildgoose	CB	Buffalo Bills
6	214	Cole Van Lanen	OG	Green Bay Packers
