= Graham Mertz =

American football player (born 2000)

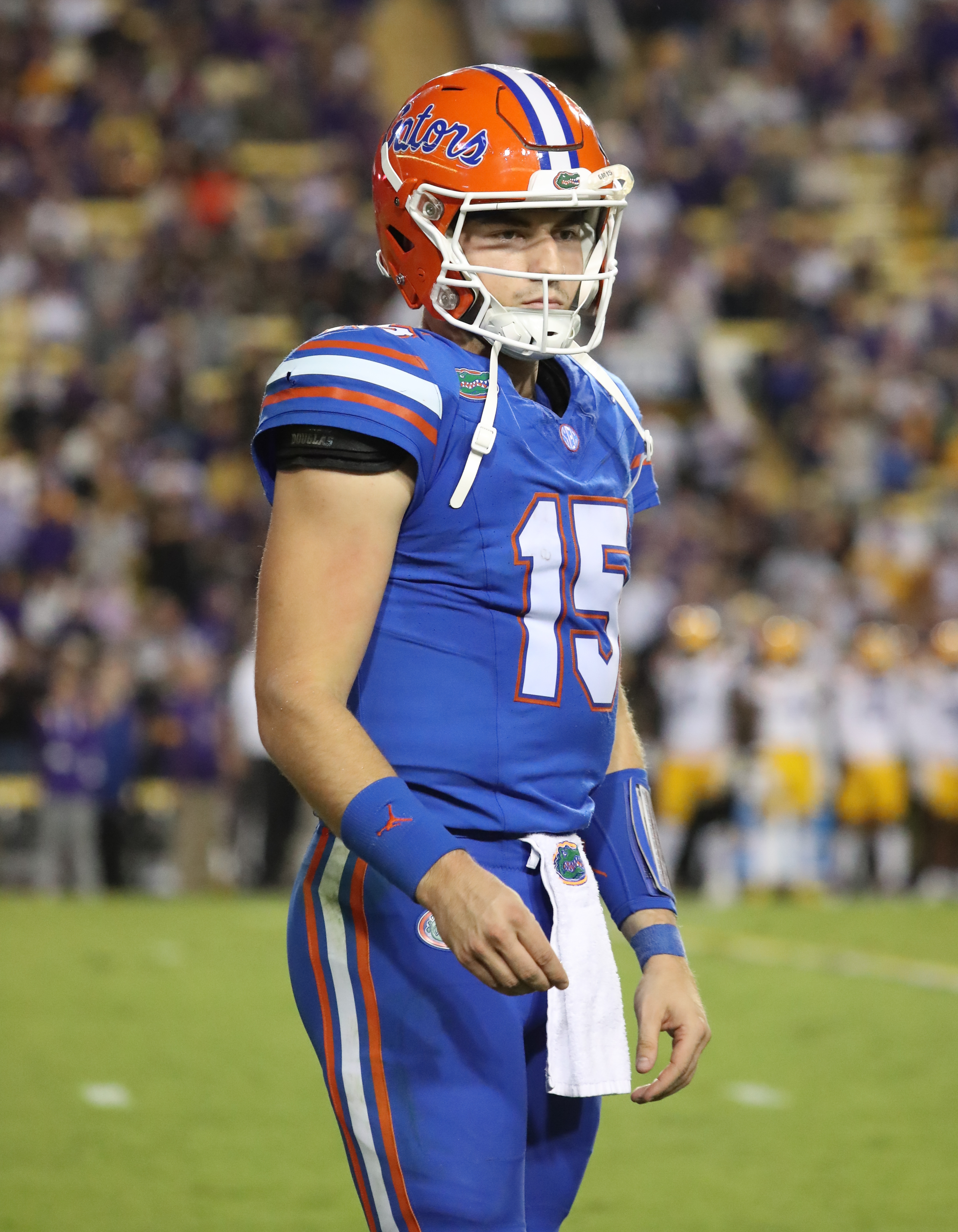
- Mertz with the Florida Gators in 2023

No. 18 – Houston Texans
- Position: Quarterback
- Roster status: Injured reserve

Personal information
- Born: December 6, 2000 (age 25); Overland Park, Kansas, U.S.
- Listed height: 6 ft 2 in (1.88 m)
- Listed weight: 216 lb (98 kg)

Career information
- High school: Blue Valley North (Overland Park)
- College: Wisconsin (2019–2022); Florida (2023–2024)
- NFL draft: 2025: 6th round, 197th overall pick

Career history
- Houston Texans (2025–present)
- Stats at Pro Football Reference

Graham Mertz (born December 6, 2000) is an American professional football quarterback for the Houston Texans of the National Football League (NFL). He played college football for the Wisconsin Badgers and Florida Gators. Mertz was selected by the Texans in the sixth round of the 2025 NFL draft.

== Early life ==
Mertz's first two years of high school were spent at Bishop Miege High School in Roeland Park, Kansas. While there, he played high school football and backed up all-state quarterback Carter Putz. Before his junior year, Mertz transferred to Blue Valley North High School in Overland Park, Kansas. He led Blue Valley North to a Class 6A state championship as a junior, and to state runner-up as a senior. In his senior year he completed 61.1% of his passes for 3,886 yards and a state-record 51 touchdowns. He was a finalist for the Elite 11 quarterback competition in 2018, and was named Gatorade Kansas Football Player of the Year. Graham was invited to the All-American Bowl after his senior season, where he set a bowl record with five touchdown passes and was named game MVP.

Mertz was rated as a four-star recruit by ESPN, 247Sports.com, and Rivals.com. ESPN rated him as the best pocket passer in the class of 2019 and 21st highest rated recruit overall. In the 247Sports Composite, Mertz was rated as the third-highest rated pro-style quarterback, the highest rated Kansas recruit, and 65th highest rated recruit overall.

Mertz committed to play football at the University of Wisconsin–Madison on October 9, 2017.

== College career ==
=== Wisconsin ===
==== 2019 ====
Three-year Wisconsin starting quarterback Alex Hornibrook announced he would be transferring to Florida State for the 2019 season, leaving a competition between Mertz and junior Jack Coan. ESPN described Mertz as Wisconsin's "most hyped QB since Russell Wilson." Mertz ultimately lost the starting job to Coan, and redshirted his true freshman season after appearing in two games.

==== 2020 ====
With Coan injured in practice before the 2020 season, Mertz began the season as the starting quarterback, becoming the first freshman quarterback to start a season-opening game for the Badgers since 1978. Mertz started the game with 17 consecutive completed passes, tying the school record, and his final line of 20-for-21 broke the school single-game completion percentage record with 95.2%. His five passing touchdowns in the 45–7 win over Illinois also tied the school single-game record. He was named Big Ten Co-Offensive Player of the Week and Freshman of the Week for the performance.

The day after the Illinois game, Mertz tested positive for COVID-19, in what would prove to be a team-wide outbreak that forced the cancellation of their next two games against Nebraska and Purdue. Mertz recovered in time for the team's next game against Michigan, which the Badgers won 49–11, despite a more subdued performance from Mertz, who threw for 127 yards and two touchdowns in the game. Wisconsin lost its next three games, against Northwestern, Indiana, and Iowa, with Mertz throwing four interceptions to just one passing touchdown during that stretch. In the final game of the regular season, against rival Minnesota, played on Big Ten Championship Saturday, Mertz left the game in the third quarter with an ankle injury. The Badgers eventually won in overtime, 20–17.

The Badgers were invited to play against Wake Forest in the Duke's Mayo Bowl. Mertz went 11-for-17, with 130 passing yards and one touchdown in the 42–28 win. After the game, Mertz dropped the trophy in the locker room celebration, shattering the football made of glass on the top of the trophy.

==== 2021 ====
Mertz served as the starting quarterback in all 13 games for Wisconsin during his redshirt sophomore season in 2021, leading the Badgers to a 9–4 record and a victory in the Las Vegas Bowl. He finished the season with 1,958 passing yards, 10 passing touchdowns, and 11 interceptions.

==== 2022 ====
Mertz served as the starting quarterback for Wisconsin once again in his redshirt junior season in 2022, leading the Badgers to a 6–6 regular season record. In a 42–7 win against Northwestern on October 8, he set a career high with 299 passing yards and five touchdown passes. He finished the season with 2,136 passing yards, 19 passing touchdowns, and 10 interceptions.

On December 4, 2022, prior to Wisconsin's bowl game, Mertz announced he was entering the transfer portal.

=== Florida ===
==== 2023 ====
Mertz joined the Florida Gators in the spring of 2023. Mertz served as the starting quarterback for Florida in 2023, leading the Gators to a 5–6 record. He finished the season with 2,903 passing yards, 20 passing touchdowns, and three interceptions.

==== 2024 ====
Mertz returned as the starting quarterback for Florida in 2024. He suffered a season-ending ACL tear against Tennessee. As 2024 was Mertz's final collegiate season, the injury also ended his college career. He finished his Gators tenure as the school's career leader in completion percentage.

=== Statistics ===
Season	Team	Games			Passing								Rushing			
Season	Team	GP	GS	Record	Cmp	Att	Pct	Yds	Avg	TD	Int	Rtg	Att	Yds	Avg	TD
2019	Wisconsin	2	0	0–0	9	10	90.0	73	7.3	0	0	151.3	2	6	3.0	0
2020	Wisconsin	7	7	4–3	118	193	61.1	1,238	6.4	9	5	125.2	36	38	1.1	2
2021	Wisconsin	13	13	9–4	169	284	59.5	1,958	6.9	10	11	121.3	37	-25	-0.7	4
2022	Wisconsin	12	12	6–6	164	286	57.3	2,136	7.5	19	10	135.0	50	-40	-0.8	2
2023	Florida	11	11	5–6	261	358	72.9	2,903	8.1	20	3	157.8	62	-75	-1.2	4
2024	Florida	5	5	2–3	72	94	76.6	791	8.4	6	2	164.1	18	56	3.1	1
Career		50	48	26–22	793	1,225	64.7	9,099	7.4	64	31	139.3	205	-40	-0.2	13

=== College accolades ===
==== Awards and honors ====
Big Ten Conference

- Big Ten Co-Offensive Player of the Week (2020)
- Big Ten Freshman of the Week (2020)

== Professional career ==
Pre-draft measurables
Height	Weight	Arm length	Hand span	Wingspan
6 ft 3 3/8 in (1.91 m)	212 lb (96 kg)	31 1/4 in (0.79 m)	9 3/4 in (0.25 m)	6 ft 4 1/2 in (1.94 m)
All values from NFL Combine

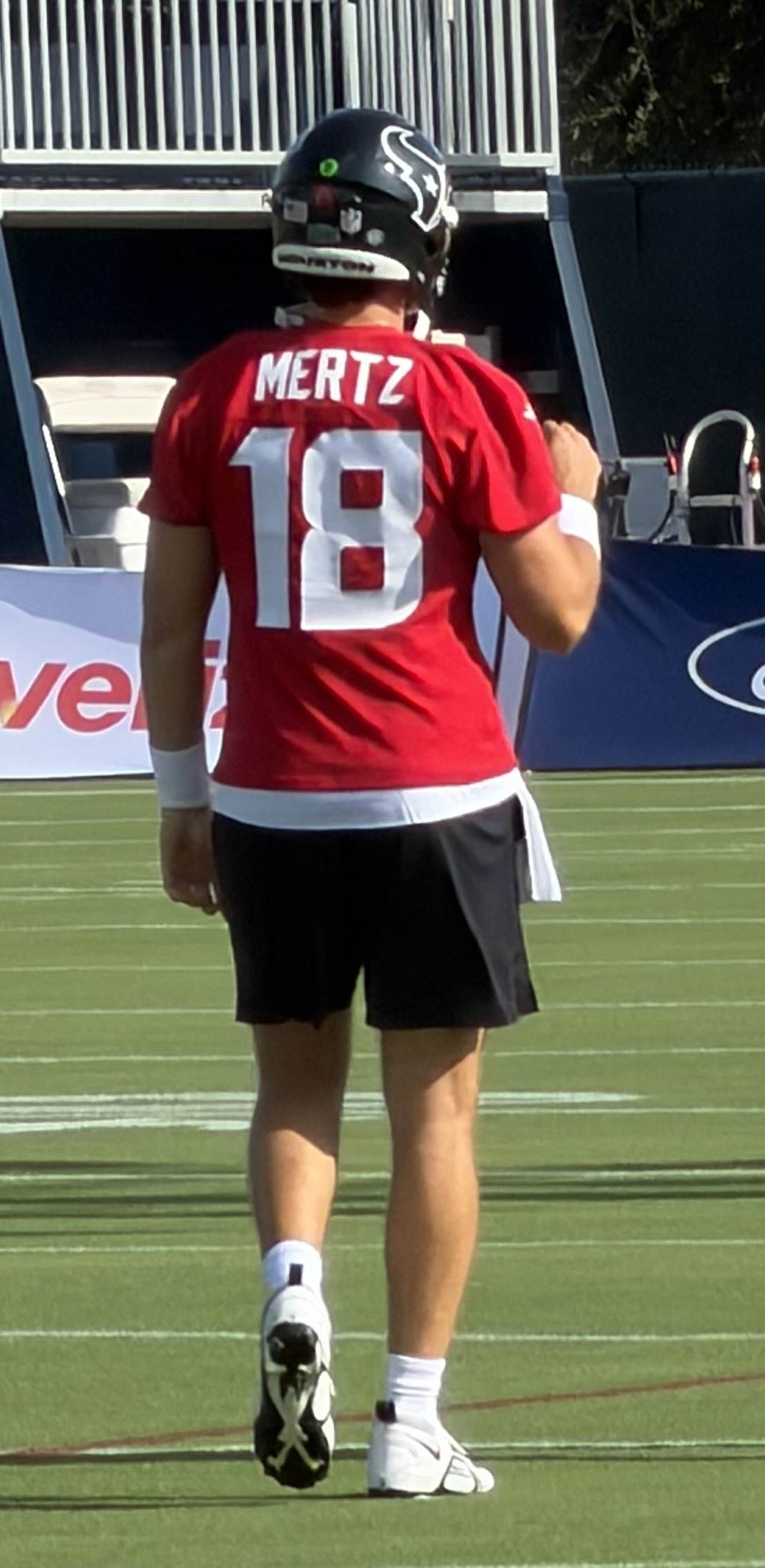
Graham Mertz at Houston Texans training camp in July 2026

Mertz was drafted by the Houston Texans in the sixth round, with the 197th overall pick in the 2025 NFL draft.

Mertz made the Texans roster as a rookie, starting the 2025 season as the third-string quarterback behind C. J. Stroud and Davis Mills.

After suffering a torn ACL during the 2026 preseason, Mertz was placed on season-ending injured reserve on August 15.

== Personal life ==
Graham's father, Ron Mertz, played football as an offensive lineman at Minnesota from 1989 to 1992. Graham has two sisters that played college basketball: Lauren, at Kansas State, and Mya, at Drake.
