= James McCourt (American football) =

American football player (born 1997)

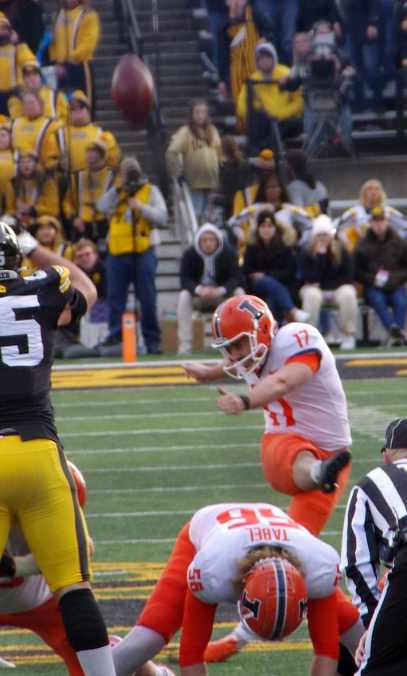
- McCourt (17) with the Illinois Fighting Illini in 2020

No. 12
- Position: Placekicker

Personal information
- Born: November 9, 1997 (age 28); Dublin, Ireland
- Listed height: 5 ft 11 in (1.80 m)
- Listed weight: 216 lb (98 kg)

Career information
- High school: St. Thomas Aquinas (Fort Lauderdale, Florida, U.S.)
- College: Illinois (2016–2021)
- NFL draft: 2022: undrafted

Career history
- Los Angeles Chargers (2022)*; Jacksonville Jaguars (2022–2023)*; Las Vegas Raiders (2023)
- * Offseason or practice squad member only
- Stats at Pro Football Reference

James C. McCourt (born November 9, 1997) is an Irish-born American former football player. He played college football for the Illinois Fighting Illini and was signed by the Los Angeles Chargers as an undrafted free agent in 2022.

== Early life ==
McCourt was born in Dublin, Ireland. He moved to Parkland, Florida, when he was eight, and grew up there. McCourt attended St. Thomas Aquinas High School in Fort Lauderdale, Florida, where he played American football. He also played Lacrosse for two years.

== College career ==
McCourt attended the University of Illinois Urbana-Champaign from 2016 to 2021.

In 2016 and 2017 for his freshman and redshirt freshman seasons, he did not see the field.

In 2018, for his sophomore season, he recorded his first kickoff, against Minnesota.

In 2019, for his junior season, McCourt made 13 of 19 field goal attempts (68.4%), and 42 of 43 on extra point attempts (97.6%). McCourt also made a 57-yard field goal vs Eastern Michigan University which tied a school record, and hit a 39-yard game winning field goal to beat No. 6 Wisconsin.

In 2020, for his senior season, McCourt made 6 of 10 field goal attempts (60%), and 15 of 15 on extra point attempts (100%). McCourt also hit a 47-yard game winning field goal vs Rutgers, to give Illinois their first win of the season.

In 2021, for his graduate season, McCourt made 18 of 23 field goal attempts (78.3%), and 26 of 26 on extra point attempts (100%). He made 14 of 15 field goal attempts inside of 50 yards.

He finished his career making 37 of his 52 field goal attempts (71.2%), and went 83 of 84 on extra point attempts (98.8%) which combined for 194 points. He holds the record for most 50+ yard field goals (8), and the record for most 50+ yard field goals made in a season (4, twice) for the Fighting Illini.

=== College statistics ===
Legend
| **Bold** | Career high |

| Year | Team | Kicking | | | | | | | |
| Year | Team | FGM | FGA | FG% | Long | XPM | XPA | XP% | PTS |
|---|---|---|---|---|---|---|---|---|---|
| 2018 | Illinois | 0 | 0 | 0.0% | 0 | 0 | 0 | 0.0% | 0 |
| 2019 | Illinois | 13 | 19 | 68.4% | **57** | **42** | **43** | 97.6% | **81** |
| 2020 | Illinois | 6 | 10 | 60.0% | 47 | 15 | 15 | **100%** | 33 |
| 2021 | Illinois | **18** | **23** | **78.3%** | 53 | 26 | 26 | **100%** | 80 |
| Career | | 37 | 52 | 71.2% | 57 | 83 | 84 | 98.8% | 194 |

== Professional career ==
Pre-draft measurables
| Height | Weight | Arm length | Hand span |
|---|---|---|---|
| 6 ft 0 in (1.83 m) | 216 lb (98 kg) | 30 1/4 in (0.77 m) | 9 in (0.23 m) |
All values from NFL Combine/Pro Day

McCourt went undrafted in the 2022 NFL draft and was signed by the Los Angeles Chargers on May 13, 2022. McCourt was waived by the Chargers on August 22.

McCourt was signed off waivers by the Jacksonville Jaguars on August 23, 2022. In McCourt's first preseason game with the Jaguars, he made a 54-yard field goal and a 38-yard field goal in a 28–12 loss against the Atlanta Falcons. McCourt was waived on August 31. Two days later, on September 2, McCourt was signed to the Jaguars practice squad. On January 23, 2023, McCourt signed a reserve/future contract with the Jaguars. On August 29, McCourt was waived by the Jaguars for the second time.

McCourt was signed by the Las Vegas Raiders on October 25, 2023. On October 30, McCourt was promoted to the active roster as starting kicker Daniel Carlson was questionable with a groin injury. After not seeing any action in the week 8 matchup versus the Detroit Lions, the Raiders waived McCourt the next day on October 31.
