= Tyler Goodson =

American football player (born 2000)

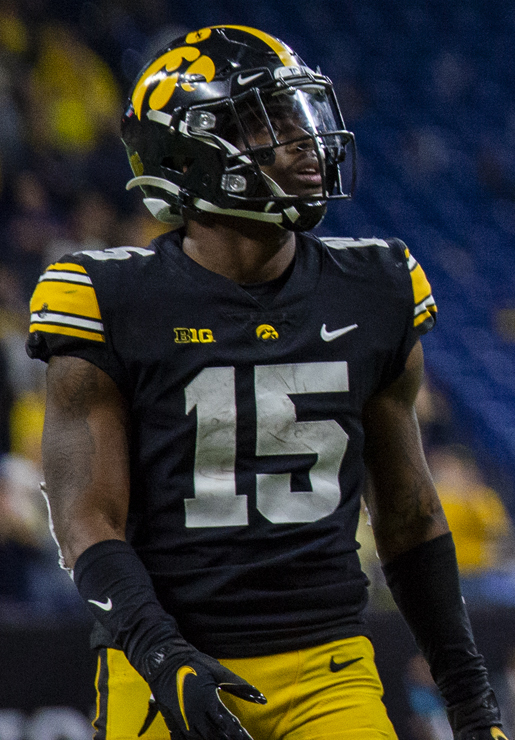
- Goodson with Iowa in 2021

No. 32 – Dallas Cowboys
- Position: Running back
- Roster status: Injured reserve

Personal information
- Born: November 10, 2000 (age 26); Suwanee, Georgia, U.S.
- Listed height: 5 ft 9 in (1.75 m)
- Listed weight: 197 lb (89 kg)

Career information
- High school: North Gwinnett (Suwanee)
- College: Iowa (2019–2021)
- NFL draft: 2022: undrafted

Career history
- Green Bay Packers (2022); Indianapolis Colts (2023–2025); Atlanta Falcons (2026)*; Dallas Cowboys (2026–present)
- * Offseason or practice squad member only

Awards and highlights
- First-team All-Big Ten (2020); Third-team All-Big Ten (2021)

Career NFL statistics as of Week 3, 2026
- Rushing yards: 286
- Rushing average: 4.8
- Rushing touchdowns: 1
- Receptions: 20
- Receiving yards: 98
- Receiving touchdowns: 1
- Stats at Pro Football Reference

Tyler Goodson (born November 10, 2000) is an American professional football running back for the Dallas Cowboys of the National Football League (NFL). He played college football for the Iowa Hawkeyes. He has previously played in the NFL for the Green Bay Packers.

== Early life ==
Goodson grew up in Suwanee, Georgia and attended North Gwinnett High School. He rushed for 1,437 yards and 25 touchdowns in his junior season. As a senior, Goodson rushed 159 times for 1,180 yards and 25 touchdowns and was named Georgia Player of the Year. He was rated a three-star recruit and committed to play college football at Iowa over offers from Nebraska, Iowa State, Indiana and Michigan State.

== College career ==
As a true freshman, Goodson led Iowa with 134 attempts for 638 yards and five touchdowns while also catching 24 passes for 166 yards. He was named first-team All-Big Ten Conference after gaining 762 yards and scoring seven touchdowns on 143 carries in his sophomore season. In his junior season, on 256 carries, he rushed for 1,151 rushing yards and six rushing touchdowns to go along with 31 receptions for 247 receiving yards and one receiving touchdown.

=== Statistics ===
Year	Team	G	Rushing					Receiving				
Year	Team	G	Att	Yards	Avg	Long	TD	Rec	Yards	Avg	Long	TD
2019	Iowa	13	134	638	4.8	55	5	24	166	6.9	31	0
2020	Iowa	8	143	762	5.3	80	7	15	152	10.1	40	0
2021	Iowa	13	256	1,151	4.5	56	6	31	247	8.0	67	1
Career		34	533	2,551	4.8	80	18	70	565	8.1	67	1

== Professional career ==
Pre-draft measurables
Height	Weight	Arm length	Hand span	Wingspan	40-yard dash	10-yard split	20-yard split	20-yard shuttle	Three-cone drill	Vertical jump	Broad jump	Bench press
5 ft 9 in (1.75 m)	197 lb (89 kg)	29 1/2 in (0.75 m)	9 in (0.23 m)	5 ft 11 1/4 in (1.81 m)	4.42 s	1.51 s	2.55 s	4.12 s	6.76 s	36.5 in (0.93 m)	10 ft 3 in (3.12 m)	15 reps
All values from NFL Combine/Pro Day

=== Green Bay Packers ===
Goodson was signed by the Green Bay Packers as an undrafted free agent on May 2, 2022, shortly after the conclusion of the 2022 NFL draft. He was waived on August 30, 2022, and signed to the practice squad the next day. On December 31, 2022, Goodson was elevated from the practice squad to the active roster. He signed a reserve/future contract on January 10, 2023.

Goodson was waived on August 29, 2023.

=== Indianapolis Colts ===
On September 12, 2023, Goodson was signed to the Indianapolis Colts practice squad. On December 16 against the Pittsburgh Steelers, Goodson had his first career NFL carry. He finished the game with 11 carries for 69 yards as the Colts won 30–13. He was elevated to the active roster on December 19. Against the Houston Texans in Week 18, Goodson dropped a critical fourth-down pass late in the fourth quarter as the Colts lost 23–19, eliminating them from playoff contention.

In three years with the Colts, Goodson ran for 264 yards and scored one touchdown and also caught one touchdown.

=== Atlanta Falcons ===
On March 26, 2026, Goodson signed with the Atlanta Falcons. On August 30, Goodson was released by the Falcons as a part of final roster cuts; he was re-signed to the team's practice squad the next day.

=== Dallas Cowboys ===
On September 15, 2026, Goodson was signed by the Dallas Cowboys off of the Falcons' practice squad.

=== Statistics ===
Year	Team	Games		Rushing					Receiving					Fumbles	
Year	Team	GP	GS	Att	Yds	Avg	Lng	TD	Rec	Yds	Avg	Lng	TD	Fum	Lost
2023	IND	6	1	13	87	6.7	31	0	6	31	5.7	15	0	0	0
2024	IND	16	0	32	153	4.8	33	1	11	64	5.5	24	1	0	0
2025	IND	11	0	9	24	2.7	6	0	2	8	4.0	0	0	0	0
2026	DAL	1	0	6	22	3.7	10	0	1	-5	-5.0	-5	0	0	0
Career		34	1	60	286	4.8	33	1	20	98	4.9	24	1	0	0
