= Josh Imatorbhebhe =

American football player (born 1998)

Profile
- Position: Wide receiver

Personal information
- Born: April 12, 1998 (age 28); Riverside, California, U.S.
- Listed height: 6 ft 2 in (1.88 m)
- Listed weight: 220 lb (100 kg)

Career information
- High school: North Gwinnett
- College: USC (2016–2018); Illinois (2019–2020)
- NFL draft: 2021: undrafted

Career history
- Jacksonville Jaguars (2021)*
- * Offseason or practice squad member only
- Stats at Pro Football Reference

Josh Imatorbhebhe (born April 12, 1998) is a world-record holder and former American football wide receiver. He played college football at the University of Illinois. Despite playing two years as a graduate transfer (from the USC Trojans) with the Illini, he finished his career 7th on the school's all-time receiving touchdowns list. In 2020, he led the team in receptions, receiving yards and touchdowns. In his college pro day (COVID, no combine) he broke the NFL standing vertical jump record at 46.5 inches. He signed as an un-drafted free agent after the NFL Draft to the Jacksonville Jaguars in 2021. After sustaining a quad injury in training camp he got released in the preseason. Josh was brought back to the practice squad in Week 7 before getting released again by the end of the season. He chose to retire after the 2021 season.

== High school career ==
247Sports had Imatorbhebhe as a four-star recruit out of North Gwinnett High School where he led the team to the 2014 Class AAAAAA Georgia state championship game. He had 32 Scholarship offers and committed to USC on Bleacher Report over UGA, Alabama, Ohio State, and Florida. ESPN ranked him the 119th best recruit in the nation, 18th among wide receivers and 13th in Georgia. He was 2014 All-Region 7-AAAAAA first-team, 2015 Prep Star All-American Dream Team, and 2015 Gwinnett Daily Post All-County third-team. He had a 4.0 GPA

== College career ==
=== USC ===
Imatorbhebhe enrolled at USC in 2016, redshirting his freshman year, before seeing limited game time, playing in 6 games as a redshirt freshman in 2017.

=== Illinois ===
Imatorbhebhe finished the 2019 season with 33 receptions for 634 receiving yards. His nine receiving touchdowns is second in school history for a single season and was fifth in the Big Ten that year. His 4-reception, 178-yard performance against Michigan State on November 9, 2019, earned him Big Ten Offensive Player of the Week honors. He was an All-Big Ten honorable mention in 2019 as a redshirt junior. He was a 2020 Athlon Preseason All-Big Ten selection.

At Illinois' 2021 pro day, Imatorbhebhe jumped what would have been an NFL Scouting Combine record 46.5 inches in the vertical. His physical ability first gained national attention when as a 17-year-old he leaped 47.1 inches at Nike's "The Opening" football camp in 2015.

== Professional career ==
Pre-draft measurables
| Height | Weight | Arm length | Hand span | Wingspan | 40-yard dash | 10-yard split | 20-yard split | 20-yard shuttle | Three-cone drill | Vertical jump | Broad jump | Bench press |
|---|---|---|---|---|---|---|---|---|---|---|---|---|
| 6 ft 0 7/8 in (1.85 m) | 218 lb (99 kg) | 32 3/8 in (0.82 m) | 9 1/4 in (0.23 m) | 6 ft 7 3/8 in (2.02 m) | 4.53 s | 1.57 s | 2.63 s | 4.38 s | 7.10 s | 46.5 in (1.18 m) | 11 ft 2 in (3.40 m) | 24 reps |
All values from Pro Day

On May 1, 2021, Imatorbhebhe signed with the Jacksonville Jaguars as an undrafted free agent. He was waived/injured on August 17, 2021, and placed on injured reserve. He was released on August 26. He was re-signed to the practice squad on October 12. He was released on November 1. On July 13, 2022, Imatorbhebhe announced via his LinkedIn profile he was retiring from football and had accepted a strategy consulting role with Deloitte.

== Personal life ==
Imatorbhebhe is from Suwanee, Georgia. He earned his bachelor's degree in business administration from USC in May 2019, and studied strategic brand communication at Illinois as a graduate student. His brother Daniel played at USC from 2016 to 2019 and is a graduate transfer tight end at Kansas State.
