= Rick Pizzo =

American sports broadcaster

Rick Pizzo, a native of Staten Island, NY, is an American sports broadcaster who currently works for the Big Ten Network. Pizzo received his bachelor's degree from Hamilton College, and a master’s from Syracuse University. He is one of the original Big Ten Network hosts, alongside Dave Revsine and Mike Hall. A former collegiate hockey player and golfer at Hamilton, Pizzo serves as BTN's main hockey and golf host.

== Previous experience ==
=== WBTW ===
From 1998 to 2001, Pizzo worked as a sports anchor/reporter for WBTW, Myrtle Beach, SC.

=== WFMY ===
From 2001 to 2007, Pizzo worked as a sports reporter, anchor/reporter for WFMY, Greensboro, North Carolina. While in Greensboro, he was named an Associated Press Award-winning sports reporter/anchor and taught sports broadcasting classes at Elon (NC) University.
