= 2020–21 College Football Playoff =

Postseason college football tournament

- Season: 2020
- Dates: January 1–11, 2021
- Teams invited: (1) Alabama; (2) Clemson; (3) Ohio State; (4) Notre Dame
- Venues: AT&T Stadium; Hard Rock Stadium; Mercedes-Benz Stadium
- Champions: Alabama (3rd CFP title, 18th overall title)

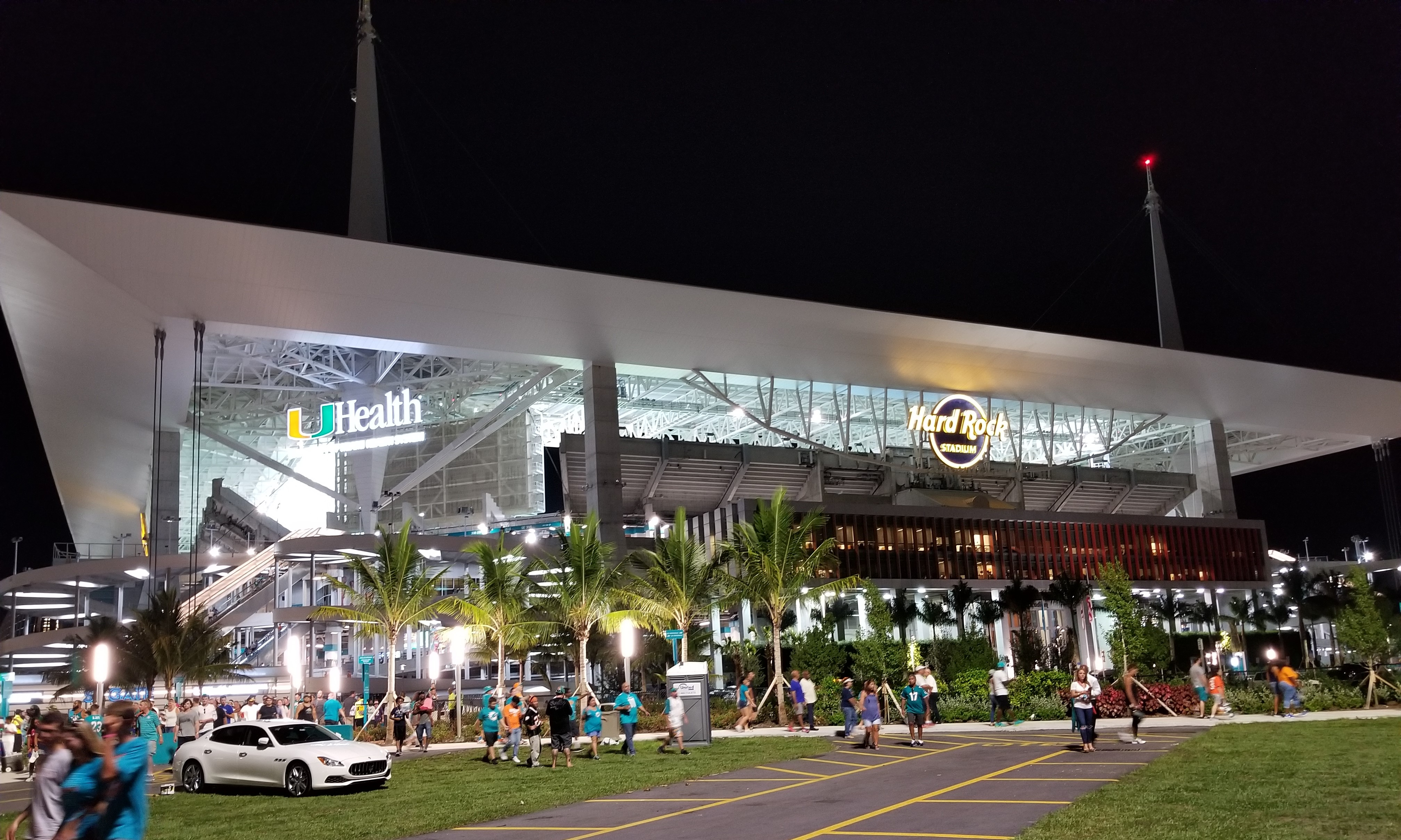
Hard Rock Stadium in Miami Gardens, Florida, hosted the College Football Playoff National Championship.

The 2020–21 College Football Playoff was a single-elimination postseason tournament that determined the national champion of the 2020 NCAA Division I FBS football season. It was the seventh edition of the College Football Playoff (CFP) and involved the top four teams in the country as ranked by the College Football Playoff poll playing in two semifinals, with the winners of each advancing to the national championship game. Three of the four teams were champions of their respective conferences: No. 1 Alabama from the Southeastern Conference, No. 2 Clemson from the Atlantic Coast Conference, and No. 3 Ohio State from the Big Ten Conference. The final participant was independent No. 4 Notre Dame.

The playoff bracket's semifinal games were held at the Rose Bowl and the Sugar Bowl on New Year's Day, part of the season's slate of bowl games. The Rose Bowl semifinal, held in Arlington, Texas, due to COVID-19 pandemic restrictions in California, saw Alabama defeat Notre Dame, 31–14. It was the first Rose Bowl held away from Pasadena, California, since 1942. The second semifinal, at the Sugar Bowl, matched Clemson and Ohio State in a rematch of the previous season's semifinal at the Fiesta Bowl. After losing the previous matchup, Ohio State defeated Clemson by a twenty-one-point margin. Following their wins, Alabama and Ohio State advanced to the national championship game, held on January 11 in Miami Gardens, Florida. The Crimson Tide defeated the Buckeyes, 52–24, to win their third CFP national championship and their eighteenth claimed national championship in school history.

The national championship was the least viewed game of the playoff; the Rose Bowl and Sugar Bowl semifinals received 18.9 million and 19.1 million viewers, respectively, compared to the 18.7 million viewers for the championship game. Alabama head coach Nick Saban won his seventh national title, which broke a tie with Bear Bryant for the most all-time.

== Bracket ==
Semifinals
January 1 – Rose Bowl AT&T Stadium, Arlington (Note: The 2021 Rose Bowl was moved to AT&T Stadium in Arlington, Texas, due to the COVID-19 pandemic in California.)
1	Alabama	31
4	Notre Dame	14
January 1 – Sugar Bowl Mercedes-Benz Superdome, New Orleans
2	Clemson	28
3	Ohio State	49

Championship
January 11 – National Championship Hard Rock Stadium, Miami Gardens
1	Alabama	52
3	Ohio State	24

== Selection and teams ==
The 2020–21 CFP selection committee was chaired by Iowa athletic director Gary Barta. Its other members were former The Arizona Republic reporter Paola Boivin, Wyoming athletic director Tom Burman, Oklahoma athletic director Joe Castiglione, Colorado athletic director Rick George, former head coach Ken Hatfield, former NFL player Ronnie Lott, Arkansas State athletic director Terry Mohajir, USA Football chairman and former Army chief of staff Ray Odierno, former Texas A&M athletic director R. C. Slocum, Georgia Tech athletic director Todd Stansbury, Florida athletic director Scott Stricklin, and mathematician and former NFL player John Urschel.

Due to the far-reaching impact of the COVID-19 pandemic, each school and conference operated under a different policy for playing games. The first rankings of the season were released on November 24, 2020; Alabama from the Southeastern Conference (SEC) debuted at No. 1, with conference-mates Texas A&M and Florida at Nos. 5 and 6. Notre Dame and Clemson, both representing the Atlantic Coast Conference (ACC), (Note: Notre Dame, a full member of the ACC but an FBS independent in football, played a full conference schedule as a member of the ACC in 2020 and were eligible for the conference championship game. This change was made due to the ACC's COVID-19 scheduling policies.) were ranked second and third, and Ohio State from the Big Ten Conference debuted fourth. The following weekend, No. 2 Notre Dame held off No. 17 North Carolina by fourteen points in Chapel Hill, and No. 15 Oregon and No. 8 Northwestern were upset by Oregon State and Michigan State, respectively. The top seven remained unchanged in the following rankings, and each of the top six teams won their next games by an average margin of 27 points. Ranked teams to lose that week included No. 17 BYU, who lost to No. 22 Coastal Carolina in the "Mormons vs. Mullets" game, and No. 15 Oklahoma State, who lost to unranked TCU. Again, the top of the rankings remained unchanged at the December 8 release. A loss by No. 6 Florida to LSU the following Saturday ended the Gators' playoff hopes; that game featured an incident in which Florida's Marco Wilson was penalized for throwing an LSU player's shoe after the play, thereby allowing the Tigers to continue the drive that ended with the game-winning field goal. That week's Michigan–Ohio State game was not played; Michigan canceled the game due to COVID-19 issues, making 2020 the first season since 1917 during which the teams did not play.

Conference championships were played the following week; leading into the weekend, Iowa State of the Big 12 Conference replaced Florida at the No. 6 spot in the rankings amidst an unchanged top five. The Pac-12 championship was originally supposed to feature Washington and No. 13 USC, though Washington dropped out of the game due to COVID-19-related personnel shortages several days beforehand. As a result, Oregon filled in as the North Division's representative in Washington's place; ultimately, Oregon defeated USC by seven points to win the conference title. Alabama secured their CFP spot with a six-point win over No. 7 Florida in the SEC championship; Matt Zenitz of AL.com wrote that the win ensured Alabama would be seeded No. 1. Meanwhile, No. 3 Clemson defeated No. 2 Notre Dame to win the ACC championship and No. 4 Ohio State won the Big Ten championship over No. 14 Northwestern. Iowa State fell to No. 10 Oklahoma in the Big 12 championship, a result that ensured neither team would make the playoff. Additionally, No. 9 Cincinnati defeated No. 23 Tulsa to win the American championship to continue their undefeated season. Though Cincinnati was generally expected to miss the playoffs, they were nearly guaranteed a New Year's Six bowl berth. The oddities of the COVID-impacted schedule meant that several regular season games were played during conference championship week as well—among them was a win by No. 5 Texas A&M over Tennessee. This win brought Texas A&M to 8–1, the only loss coming to No. 1 Alabama, meaning the Aggies were widely viewed as being in contention for a CFP berth.

The College Football Playoff matchups, along with the rest of the final CFP rankings, were released by the selection committee on December 20, 2020. Alabama maintained its No. 1 spot and Ohio State rose to No. 3 following each teams' respective conference title victory; Clemson similarly rose to No. 2 while Notre Dame, the ACC runners-up, slid to No. 4 but still made the playoff. Texas A&M and Big 12 champions Oklahoma were the first two teams out of the field at Nos. 5 and 6, respectively. The bracket was set with pairings of No. 1 Alabama and No. 4 Notre Dame in the Rose Bowl semifinal along with No. 2 Clemson and No. 3 Ohio State in the Sugar Bowl semifinal. The inclusion of Ohio State drew media criticism due to their shorter schedule, and similar criticism arose from the exclusion of Texas A&M, mostly on the basis of strength of schedule. Instead, the Aggies, ranked fifth in the final CFP poll, were assigned to the Orange Bowl against No. 13 North Carolina. The other New Year's Six bowl assignments included No. 6 Oklahoma and No. 7 Florida in the Cotton Bowl Classic, No. 25 Oregon vs. No. 10 Iowa State in the Fiesta Bowl, and No. 8 Cincinnati facing No. 9 Georgia in the Peach Bowl.

2020 College Football Playoff rankings top six progression
No.	Week 12	Week 13	Week 14	Week 15	Final
1	Alabama (7–0)	Alabama (8–0)	Alabama (9–0)	Alabama (10–0)	Alabama (11–0)
2	Notre Dame (8–0)	Notre Dame (9–0)	Notre Dame (10–0)	Notre Dame (10–0)	Clemson (10–1)
3	Clemson (7–1)	Clemson (8–1)	Clemson (9–1)	Clemson (9–1)	Ohio State (6–0)
4	Ohio State (4–0)	Ohio State (4–0)	Ohio State (5–0)	Ohio State (5–0)	Notre Dame (10–1)
5	Texas A&M (5–1)	Texas A&M (6–1)	Texas A&M (7–1)	Texas A&M (7–1)	Texas A&M (8–1)
6	Florida (6–1)	Florida (7–1)	Florida (8–1)	Iowa State (8–2)	Oklahoma (8–2)

Key: Team increased ranking from previous week Team decreased ranking from previous week Team selected to College Football Playoff

== Playoff games ==
=== Semifinals ===
==== Rose Bowl ====
2021 Rose Bowl

Quarter	1	2	3	4	Total
No. 4 Notre Dame	0	7	0	7	14
No. 1 Alabama	14	7	7	3	31

at AT&T Stadium • Arlington, Texas

- Date: January 1, 2021
- Game time: 1:00 p.m. PST

The Rose Bowl semifinal marked the eighth meeting between Alabama and Notre Dame; the Irish entered with a 5–2 series lead. The teams had last met in the 2013 BCS National Championship Game, a 28-point Alabama win. As a result of California COVID-19 policies, the game was played at AT&T Stadium in Arlington, Texas, instead of at the Rose Bowl. Alabama took the game's first lead with a touchdown on their first drive, a pass from Mac Jones to DeVonta Smith. The Crimson Tide continued by scoring on both of their next two possessions, giving them a 21–7 halftime lead. Christian Harris intercepted an Ian Book pass for the Crimson Tide on their first defensive series of the second half; Alabama's offense scored on their ensuing drive. The Tide led 31–7 before a Notre Dame touchdown—a 1-yard rush by Book—and a successfully-recovered onside kick with fifty-four seconds to play. Notre Dame's final drive ended with an incomplete pass at the Alabama 15-yard line, and the Crimson Tide advanced to the championship game with a 31–14 win.

==== Sugar Bowl ====
2021 Sugar Bowl

Quarter	1	2	3	4	Total
No. 3 Ohio State	14	21	7	7	49
No. 2 Clemson	14	0	7	7	28

at Mercedes-Benz Superdome • New Orleans, Louisiana

- Date: January 1, 2021
- Game time: 7:00 p.m. CST

Clemson and Ohio State met for the third time in CFP history and the fifth time ever in the Sugar Bowl semifinal. Clemson had won all four of the teams' previous meetings, including CFP semifinal matchups at the 2016 Fiesta Bowl and the 2019 Fiesta Bowl. The first six possessions of the game featured two touchdowns and one punt for each team: Trevor Lawrence and Travis Etienne scored rushing touchdowns for Clemson while a Trey Sermon rush and a Luke Farrell reception pulled the Buckeyes level. Ohio State's first lead came with 10:35 left in the second quarter on a pass from Justin Fields to Jeremy Ruckert following a Clemson three-and-out. The Buckeyes scored twice more before halftime and the teams traded touchdowns twice in the second half, allowing Ohio State to maintain their 21-point lead. Clemson's final possession ended with a Sevyn Banks interception; Ohio State won 49–28.

=== Championship game ===
2021 College Football Playoff National Championship

Quarter	1	2	3	4	Total
No. 3 Ohio State	7	10	7	0	24
No. 1 Alabama	7	28	10	7	52

at Hard Rock Stadium • Miami Gardens, Florida

- Date: January 11, 2021
- Game time: 8:00 p.m. EST

The national championship game between Alabama and Ohio State marked the teams' fifth meeting. Alabama had won three of the previous four games, though Ohio State won the teams' last meeting at the 2015 Sugar Bowl, a CFP semifinal. After a three-and-out by the Buckeyes to begin the game, Alabama scored on a rush by Najee Harris and a reception by Heisman Trophy winner DeVonta Smith, giving them a lead early in the second quarter. Master Teague's rushing touchdown tied the game, but Alabama retook the lead for good on their next drive with a touchdown pass from Jones to Harris. The Crimson Tide added two touchdowns in the first half, giving them a 35–17 halftime lead, and two more in the second half while forcing Ohio State into a turnover on downs on consecutive drives in the late third quarter and mid-fourth quarter. A 20-yard Garrett Wilson touchdown reception on OSU's first drive of the second half marked their final points of the game, as Alabama ultimately claimed the championship by a 52–24 score.

== Aftermath ==
The championship victory marked Alabama's third CFP championship and their eighteenth national title in school history. It was the seventh for Alabama head coach Nick Saban, giving him the record over Bear Bryant, with whom he had been tied on six championships apiece. It was the least-watched national championship since the introduction of the Bowl Championship Series in 1998 with a total viewership of 18.7 million. Both semifinal games outperformed the championship in terms of viewership: the Ohio State–Clemson semifinal had 19.1 million viewers, just ahead of the 18.9 million who watched Alabama–Notre Dame.

The championship game was the last at Alabama for offensive coordinator Steve Sarkesian, who left to take the head coaching job at Texas following the season. Sarkesian returned to the CFP with the Longhorns in 2023–24 and 2024–25.
