= 2021 Sugar Bowl =

College Football Playoff Semifinal bowl game

2021 Allstate Sugar Bowl
- College Football Playoff Semifinal; 87th Sugar Bowl
Ohio State Buckeyes	Clemson Tigers
(6–0)	(10–1)
Big Ten	ACC
49	28
Head coach: Ryan Day	Head coach: Dabo Swinney
AP / Coaches / CFP; 3 / 3 / 3	AP / Coaches / CFP; 2 / 2 / 2
	1	2	3	4	Total
Ohio State	14	21	7	7	49
Clemson	14	0	7	7	28
- Date: January 1, 2021
- Season: 2020
- Stadium: Mercedes-Benz Superdome
- Location: New Orleans, Louisiana
- MVP: Justin Fields (QB, Ohio State); Tuf Borland (LB, Ohio State)
- Favorite: Clemson by 7
- Referee: David Alvarez (Big 12)
- Attendance: 3,000

United States TV coverage
- Network: ESPN
- Announcers: Chris Fowler (play-by-play); Kirk Herbstreit (analyst); Maria Taylor and Tom Rinaldi (sidelines)
- Nielsen ratings: (19.15 million viewers)

International TV coverage
- Network: ESPN Deportes; ESPN Brasil
- Announcers: ESPN Brasil: Matheus Pinheiro (play-by-play); Weinny Eirado (analyst)

The 2021 Sugar Bowl was a college football bowl game played on January 1, 2021, with kickoff at 8:00 p.m. EST (7:00 p.m. local CST). The Sugar Bowl was one of two College Football Playoff semifinal games, it featured two of the four teams selected by the College Football Playoff Selection Committee—Ohio State from the Big Ten and Clemson from the Atlantic Coast Conference (ACC), with the winner advancing to face the winner of the Rose Bowl, Alabama, in the 2021 College Football Playoff National Championship. It was the 87th edition of the Sugar Bowl, and was one of the 2020–21 bowl games concluding the 2020 FBS football season. Sponsored by insurance provider Allstate, the game was officially known as the College Football Playoff Semifinal at the Allstate Sugar Bowl.

The game was carried by ESPN, with its lead college football broadcast team of Chris Fowler on play-by-play and Kirk Herbstreit on color commentary. Three days before the game, Herbstreit announced that he had tested positive for COVID-19 and would work the game from his home.

== Background ==
=== College Football Playoff ===
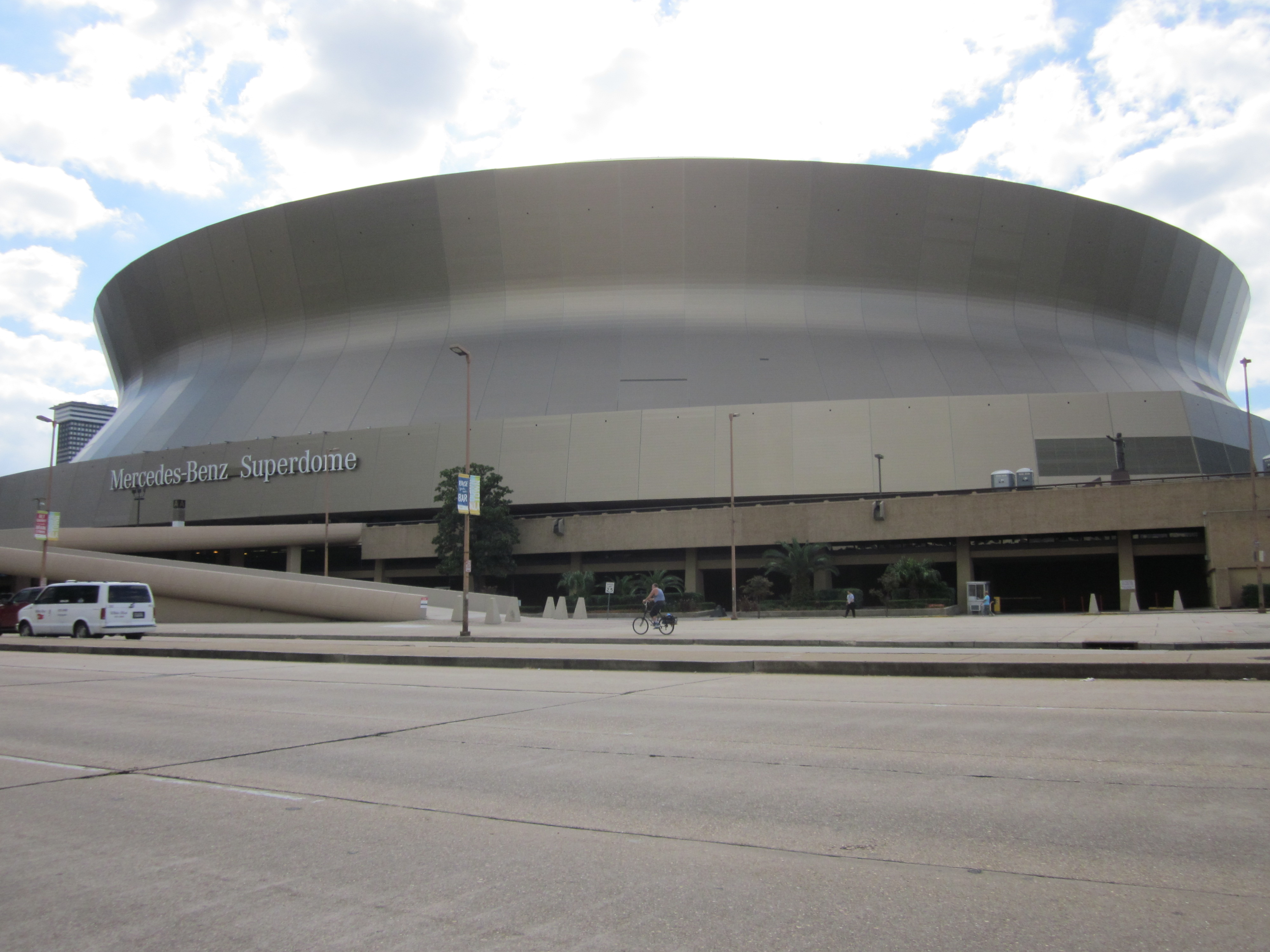
Mercedes-Benz Superdome, site of the Sugar Bowl

The four teams competing in the Playoff were chosen by the CFP selection committee, whose final rankings were released on December 4, 2022. The committee selected No. 1 Alabama from the Southeastern Conference (SEC), No. 2 Clemson from the Atlantic Coast Conference (ACC), No. 3 Ohio State from the Big Ten Conference, and No. 4 Notre Dame, an FBS independent playing as an ACC member for the 2020 season. Alabama entered the playoff with an undefeated 11–0 record, Clemson and Notre Dame both entered 10–1, and Ohio State entered 6–0.

Semifinals
January 1 – Rose Bowl AT&T Stadium, Arlington (Note: The 2021 Rose Bowl was moved to AT&T Stadium in Arlington, Texas, due to the COVID-19 pandemic in California.)
1	Alabama	31
4	Notre Dame	14
January 1 – Sugar Bowl Mercedes-Benz Superdome, New Orleans
2	Clemson	28
3	Ohio State	49

Championship
January 11 – National Championship Hard Rock Stadium, Miami Gardens
1	Alabama	52
3	Ohio State	24

== Teams ==
The 2021 Sugar Bowl was held between the Clemson Tigers of the Atlantic Coast Conference (ACC) and the Ohio State Buckeyes of the Big Ten Conference. The game was a rematch of the 2019 Fiesta Bowl, where Clemson defeated Ohio State to advance to the 2020 National Championship Game. It was the 18th Sugar Bowl featuring a matchup of two teams ranked in the top 5. The teams were announced by College Football Playoff selection committee on December 20, 2020.

Only 3,000 ticketed spectators were permitted because of the coronavirus pandemic. There were 728 tickets for family members of Ohio State players and coaches and 728 tickets for family members of Clemson players and coaches. The remaining 1,544 tickets were for sponsors, business partners, and local Sugar Bowl season ticket holders.

=== Clemson Tigers ===
Clemson entered the game with a record of 10–1 (8–1 ACC) after defeating Notre Dame in the 2020 ACC Championship. Clemson's only loss was to Notre Dame earlier in the season, a double-overtime loss in a game the Tigers played without starting quarterback Trevor Lawrence. Other than Notre Dame, Clemson's only win over a ranked team came against Miami (FL). The Tigers were ranked No. 2 entering the game.

=== Ohio State Buckeyes ===
Ohio State entered the game with a record of 6–0 (5–0 Big Ten) after defeating Northwestern in the 2020 Big Ten Championship. In addition to Northwestern, Ohio State defeated two ranked teams during the season, Penn State and Indiana. Due to a six-win campaign, Clemson head coach Dabo Swinney stated that the Buckeyes "weren't a Top 10 team", voting them at No. 11 prior to the game. The Buckeyes were ranked No. 3 entering the game.

== Game summary ==
The game's officiating crew, representing the Big 12 Conference, was led by referee David Alvarez and umpire Rob Richeson. The game was played indoors at Mercedes-Benz Superdome in New Orleans, Louisiana, on January 1, 2021, with a start time of 7:20 p.m. CST.

The pregame coin toss was won by Ohio State, who deferred their choice to the second half, thereby giving Clemson possession of the ball to begin the game.

=== First half ===
Clemson began the game with possession of the ball following Blake Haubeil's opening kickoff.

=== Scoring summary ===
College Football Playoff Semifinal at the 2021 Allstate Sugar Bowl

Quarter	1	2	3	4	Total
No. 3 Ohio State	14	21	7	7	49
No. 2 Clemson	14	0	7	7	28

at Mercedes-Benz Superdome • New Orleans, Louisiana

- Date: Friday, January 1, 2021
- Game time: 8:20 p.m. EST (7:20 p.m. CST)
- Game weather: n/a (game played indoors)
- Game attendance: 3,000
- Referee: David Alvarez (Big 12)
- TV announcers (ESPN): Chris Fowler (play-by-play), Kirk Herbstreit (analyst), Maria Taylor and Tom Rinaldi (sidelines)
- ESPN game summary

Scoring summary

Quarter	Time	Drive			Team	Scoring information	Score	
Quarter	Time	Plays	Yards	TOP	Team	Scoring information	Ohio State	Clemson
1	12:10	8	82	2:50	Clemson	Trevor Lawrence 2-yard touchdown run, B. T. Potter kick good	0	7
1	7:59	3	77	1:12	Ohio State	Trey Sermon 32-yard touchdown run, Blake Haubeil kick good	7	7
1	5:01	7	75	2:58	Clemson	Travis Etienne 3-yard touchdown run, B. T. Potter kick good	7	14
1	1:36	6	75	3:25	Ohio State	Luke Farrell 8-yard touchdown reception from Justin Fields, Blake Haubeil kick good	14	14
2	10:35	9	84	4:16	Ohio State	Jeremy Ruckert 17-yard touchdown reception from Justin Fields, Blake Haubeil kick good	21	14
2	5:12	9	75	4:25	Ohio State	Chris Olave 9-yard touchdown reception from Justin Fields, Blake Haubeil kick good	28	14
2	0:11	12	80	3:09	Ohio State	Jeremy Ruckert 12-yard touchdown reception from Justin Fields, Blake Haubeil kick good	35	14
3	7:56	9	80	3:49	Clemson	Cornell Powell 10-yard touchdown reception from Trevor Lawrence, B. T. Potter kick good	35	21
3	4:55	7	91	3:00	Ohio State	Chris Olave 56-yard touchdown reception from Justin Fields, Blake Haubeil kick good	42	21
4	14:03	2	59	0:49	Ohio State	Jameson Williams 45-yard touchdown reception from Justin Fields, Blake Haubeil kick good	49	21
4	10:42	10	75	3:21	Clemson	Cornell Powell 26-yard touchdown reception from Trevor Lawrence, B. T. Potter kick good	49	28
"TOP" = time of possession. For other American football terms, see Glossary of American football.							49	28

== Statistics ==
Team statistical comparison
Statistic	Ohio State	Clemson
First downs	26	23
First downs rushing	10	4
First downs passing	15	17
First downs penalty	1	2
Third down efficiency	5–12	5–12
Fourth down efficiency	0–0	0–2
Total plays–net yards	72–639	70–444
Rushing attempts–net yards	44–254	22–44
Yards per rush	5.8	2.0
Yards passing	385	400
Pass completions–attempts	22–28	33–48
Interceptions thrown	1	1
Punt returns–total yards	2–14	0–0
Kickoff returns–total yards	0–0	2–41
Punts–average yardage	4–47.2	5–47.4
Fumbles–lost	1–0	3–1
Penalties–yards	9–95	3–20
Time of possession	34:05	25:55

Ohio State statistics
Buckeyes passing
	C–A	Yds	TD–INT
Justin Fields	22–28	385	6–1
Buckeyes rushing
	Car	Yds	TD
Trey Sermon	31	193	1
Justin Fields	8	42	0
Miyan Williams	3	21	0
TEAM	2	−2	0
Buckeyes receiving
	Rec	Yds	TD
Chris Olave	6	132	2
Trey Sermon	4	61	0
Jameson Williams	3	62	1
Jeremy Ruckert	3	55	2
Garrett Wilson	2	52	0
Jaxon Smith-Njigba	2	12	0
Luke Farrell	2	11	1

Clemson statistics
Tigers passing
	C–A	Yds	TD–INT
Trevor Lawrence	33–48	400	2–1
Tigers rushing
	Car	Yds	TD
Travis Etienne	10	32	1
Lyn-J Dixon	2	20	0
Trevor Lawrence	10	−8	1
Tigers receiving
	Rec	Yds	TD
Cornell Powell	8	139	2
Travis Etienne	4	64	0
Amari Rodgers	8	54	0
E.J. Williams	5	45	0
Braden Galloway	2	38	0
Davis Allen	2	35	0
Brannon Spector	2	16	0
Frank Ladson Jr.	1	9	0
Lyn-J Dixon	1	0	0
