= 2020 Ohio State Buckeyes football team =

American college football season

2020 Ohio State Buckeyes football

Big Ten champion Big Ten East Division champion Sugar Bowl champion

Big Ten Championship Game, W 22–10 vs. Northwestern

Sugar Bowl (CFP semifinal), W 49–28 vs. Clemson CFP National Championship, L 24–52 vs. Alabama
- Conference: Big Ten Conference
- East Division

Ranking
- Coaches: No. 2
- AP: No. 2
- Record: 7–1 (5–0 Big Ten)
- Head coach: Ryan Day (2nd season)
- Offensive coordinator: Kevin Wilson (4th season)
- Offensive scheme: West Coast spread
- Defensive coordinator: Kerry Coombs (1st season)
- Co-defensive coordinator: Greg Mattison (2nd season)
- Base defense: 4–3
- Captains: Wyatt Davis; Tuf Borland; Shaun Wade; Justin Hilliard; Justin Fields; Jonathon Cooper; Josh Myers
- Home stadium: Ohio Stadium

2020 Big Ten Conference football standings
	Conf.			Overall
Team	W		L	W		L
East Division
No. 2 Ohio State xy$^	5	–	0	7	–	1
No. 12 Indiana	6	–	1	6	–	2
Penn State	4	–	5	4	–	5
Maryland	2	–	3	2	–	3
Rutgers	3	–	6	3	–	6
Michigan	2	–	4	2	–	4
Michigan State	2	–	5	2	–	5
West Division
No. 10 Northwestern xy	6	–	1	7	–	2
No. 16 Iowa	6	–	2	6	–	2
Wisconsin	3	–	3	4	–	3
Minnesota	3	–	4	3	–	4
Nebraska	3	–	5	3	–	5
Purdue	2	–	4	2	–	4
Illinois	2	–	6	2	–	6
Championship: Ohio State 22, Northwestern 10
^ – College Football Playoff participant; $ – Conference champion; x – Division champion/co-champions; y – Championship game participant; Note: Due to COVID-19, the Big Ten suspended the season on August 11, but later decided to begin play on October 24. In addition to the title game that was played on December 19, the conference seeded all remaining teams for "championship week" games.; Rankings from AP Poll.

The 2020 Ohio State Buckeyes football team represented Ohio State University in the 2020 NCAA Division I FBS football season. They were led by second-year head coach Ryan Day, and played their home games at Ohio Stadium in Columbus, Ohio. It was the Buckeyes' 131st season overall and 108th as a member of the Big Ten Conference.

The season was played amidst the COVID-19 pandemic. The Big Ten Conference initially cancelled the fall sports season, on August 11, 2020, but reversed course on September 16, announcing an eight-game conference-only schedule. Ohio State's nonconference games against Bowling Green, Oregon, and Buffalo were cancelled. Precautions were taken to promote player, staff, and fan safety, including regular COVID-19 testing, isolation requirements, and mask wearing; games were largely played with no or few fans in attendance.

Ohio State began the season ranked second in the preseason AP Poll. In the regular season, the team secured victories against ranked opponents Penn State and Indiana, but had games canceled, due to COVID-19 outbreaks, against Maryland, Illinois and Michigan. Big Ten Conference rules established before the season specified that teams would need to complete at least six conference games in order to be eligible for the conference championship game. After Ohio State's game against Michigan was canceled, and Ohio State having only completed five games, the conference voted to change these rules and allow the undefeated Ohio State team to represent the East Division. The conference cited the fact that Ohio State would have won the division with either a win or loss against Michigan. In the conference title game, Ohio State defeated West Division champion Northwestern, 22–10, winning their fourth consecutive Big Ten title. In the final College Football Playoff rankings of the season, Ohio State was ranked third, earning them a place in the national semi-final game to be played at the Sugar Bowl against second-seeded Clemson. In that game, a rematch of the previous season's semifinal, Ohio State won by a score of 49–28. The team advanced to the CFP National Championship against top-seeded Alabama, who had advanced by winning the Rose Bowl. The Buckeyes lost, 52–24. This would be Ohio State's last appearance in the Big Ten Championship Game until 2025.

The Buckeye offense was led by junior quarterback Justin Fields, who led the Big Ten Conference with 2,100 passing yards and 22 passing touchdowns, and was named the conference's Offensive Player of the Year. The team's leading rushers were Trey Sermon and Master Teague, the former setting a school record with 331 rushing yards in the Big Ten Championship Game. Wide receivers Chris Olave and Garrett Wilson were each named first-team all-conference. Offensive lineman Wyatt Davis was a consensus All-American and the conference's Offensive Lineman of the Year. On defense, the team featured consensus All-American cornerback Shaun Wade, who was the conference's Defensive Back of the Year. Linebacker Pete Werner was also named first-team all-conference and led the team in tackles.

== Schedule ==
Ohio State had games scheduled against Bowling Green, Oregon, and Buffalo, but canceled these games on July 9 due to the Big Ten Conference's decision to play a conference-only schedule due to the COVID-19 pandemic. The Big Ten successfully voted to postpone all fall sports, including football, on August 11, but announced on September 16 that the decision had been reversed, and that the football season would begin on October 23.

In Big Ten Conference play, Ohio State will play all members of the East Division and the Nebraska Cornhuskers and Illinois Fighting Illini from the West Division. On November 11, Maryland announced the game scheduled for November 14 was canceled due after team-related activities were paused because of an elevated number of coronavirus cases within the Terrapins' program.

On November 27, it was announced that head coach Ryan Day contracted COVID-19 and was in self isolation. Larry Johnson was named interim head coach for the Illinois game to be played on November 28. On the evening of November 27, the Ohio State - Illinois game was officially canceled as the OSU athletic department paused all team-related football activities amid further positive tests for COVID-19 were discovered.

On December 8, Michigan announced the game scheduled for December 12 was canceled and all team-related activities were paused because of an elevated number of coronavirus cases within the Wolverines' program. Due to the cancellation, Ohio State would have not reached the 6 game minimum for the Big Ten Championship Game, but the conference lowered the minimum requirement to 5 games, allowing the team to face the Northwestern Wildcats in the championship game.

On December 19, Ohio State beat the Northwestern Wildcats in the Big Ten Championship game 22–10. The following day, the Buckeyes were selected as the No. 3 seed by the College Football Playoff Selection Committee, resulting in a spot in the Sugar Bowl against the No. 2 Clemson Tigers.

On January 1, 2021, the Ohio State defeated the Clemson Tigers in the Sugar Bowl 49–28, advancing them to the College Football Playoff National Championship game against the No. 1 Alabama Crimson Tide.

Date	Time	Opponent	Rank	Site	TV	Result	Attendance
October 24	12:00 p.m.	Nebraska	No. 5	Ohio Stadium; Columbus, OH	FOX	W 52–17	1,344
October 31	7:30 p.m.	at No. 18 Penn State	No. 3	Beaver Stadium; State College, PA (College GameDay)	ABC	W 38–25	1,500
November 7	7:30 p.m.	Rutgers	No. 3	Ohio Stadium; Columbus, OH	BTN	W 49–27	1,275
November 14	3:30 p.m	at Maryland	No. 3	Maryland Stadium; College Park, MD	BTN	No contest	
November 21	12:00 p.m.	No. 9 Indiana	No. 3	Ohio Stadium; Columbus, OH (Big Noon Kickoff)	FOX	W 42–35	635
November 28	12:00 p.m.	at Illinois	No. 4	Memorial Stadium; Champaign, IL (Illibuck Trophy)	FS1	No contest	
December 5	12:00 p.m.	at Michigan State	No. 4	Spartan Stadium; East Lansing, MI	ABC	W 52–12	0
December 12	12:00 p.m.	Michigan	No. 4	Ohio Stadium; Columbus, OH (rivalry)	FOX	No contest	
December 19	12:00 p.m.	vs. No. 14 Northwestern	No. 4	Lucas Oil Stadium; Indianapolis, IN (Big Ten Championship Game, Big Noon Kickoff)	FOX	W 22–10	3,178
January 1, 2021	8:00 p.m.	vs. No. 2 Clemson*	No. 3	Mercedes-Benz Superdome; New Orleans, LA (Sugar Bowl—CFP Semifinal, College GameDay)	ESPN	W 49–28	3,000
January 11, 2021	8:00 p.m.	vs. No. 1 Alabama*	No. 3	Hard Rock Stadium; Miami Gardens, FL (CFP National Championship, College GameDay)	ESPN	L 24–52	14,926
*Non-conference game; Rankings from AP Poll and CFP Rankings (after November 24) released prior to game; All times are in Eastern time

== Rankings ==
Ranking movements Legend: ██ Increase in ranking ██ Decrease in ranking — = Not ranked ( ) = First-place votes
	Week																	
Poll	Pre	1	2	3	4	5	6	7	8	9	10	11	12	13	14	15	16	Final
AP	2 (21)	2*	—*	—*	6 (4)	6 (2)	6	5	3	3	3 (1)	3	3	3	3	3	3	2
Coaches	2 (17)	2*	—*	10 (2)	6 (2)	6 (2)	5 (2)	5 (2)	3 (2)	3 (2)	3 (3)	3 (1)	3 (1)	4 (1)	4 (1)	4	3	2
CFP	Not released												4	4	4	4	3	Not released

(*) Big Ten Conference members were not eligible for the Week 2 of the AP and Coaches Polls and Week 3 of the AP due to not having a scheduled season at the time.

== Roster ==
2020 Ohio State Buckeyes football team roster
Players
Coaches
Offense

Pos.	#	Name	Class
QB	1	Justin Fields (C)	Jr
WR	2	Chris Olave	Jr
RB	3	Demario McCall	Sr
WR	4	Julian Fleming	Fr
WR	5	Garrett Wilson	So
WR	6	Jameson Williams	So
WR	7	Kamryn Babb	So
RB	8	Trey Sermon	GS
QB	9	Jack Miller III	Fr
WR	10	Mookie Cooper	Fr
WR	11	Jaxon Smith-Njigba	Fr
QB	12	Gunnar Hoak	GS
WR	13	Gee Scott Jr.	Fr
QB	14	C. J. Stroud	Fr
WR	15	Jaylen Harris	Sr
TE	16	Cade Stover	Fr
QB	17	Danny Vanatsky	Jr
QB	18	J.P. Andrade	So
QB	19	Jagger LaRoe	So
RB	22	Steele Chambers	Fr
RB	24	Marcus Crowley	So
RB	25	Xavier Johnson	So
RB	28	Miyan Williams	Fr
RB	33	Master Teague	So
WR	38	Marvin Davies	Fr
RB	43	Robert Cope	Jr
TE	49	Patrick Gurd	Fr
C	50	Nathan Brock	Sr
OL	52	Wyatt Davis (C)	Jr
OL	53	Luke Wypler	Fr
OL	55	Matthew Jones	So
OL	59	Zach Stevenson	So
OL	60	Ryan Smith	So
OL	61	Gabin Cupp	GS
OL	62	Chris Kuhn	Jr
OL	64	Jack Jamieson	Jr
OL	66	Enokk Vimahi	Fr
OL	67	Jakob James	Fr
OL	68	Ryan Jacoby	Fr
OL	69	Trey LeRoux	Fr
OL	70	Josh Fryar	Fr
OL	71	Josh Myers (C)	Jr
OL	73	Grant Toutant	Fr
OL	74	Max Wray	So
OL	75	Thayer Munford	Sr
OL	76	Harry Miller	So
OL	77	Paris Johnson Jr.	Fr
OT	78	Nicholas Petit-Frere	So
OL	79	Dawand Jones	So
TE	80	Corey Rau	Sr
TE	81	Jake Hausmann	Sr
WR	82	Sam Wiglusz	Jr
TE	84	Joe Royer	Fr
WR	85	Austin Kutscher	Jr
WR	86	Chris Booker	Sr
WR	87	Ellijah Gardiner	Jr
TE	88	Jeremy Ruckert	Jr
TE	89	Luke Farrell	Sr

Defense

Pos.	#	Name	Class
DE	0	Jonathon Cooper (C)	GS
S	2	Kourt Williams	Fr
LB	3	Teradja Mitchell	Jr
CB	4	LeJond Cavazos	Fr
LB	5	Baron Browning	Sr
DT	6	Taron Vincent	So
CB	7	Sevyn Banks	Jr
DE	8	Javontae Jean-Baptiste	So
DE	9	Zach Harrison	So
S	10	Cameron Martinez	Fr
DE	11	Tyreke Smith	Jr
S	12	Lathan Ransom	Fr
CB	13	Tyreke Johnson	So
S	14	Ronnie Hickman	So
CB	16	Ryan Watts	Fr
S	17	Bryson Shaw	Fr
LB	19	Dallas Gant	Jr
LB	20	Pete Werner	Sr
CB	21	Marcus Williamson	Sr
S	23	Marcus Hooker	So
CB	24	Shaun Wade (C)	Jr
LB	25	Craig Young	So
CB	26	Cameron Brown	Jr
CB	29	Darryl Sinclair	Sr
S	30	Kevin Dever	Jr
LB	32	Tuf Borland (C)	GS
S	34	Alec Taylor	Jr
LB	35	Tommy Eichenberg	Fr
LB	36	K'Vaughn Pope	Jr
LB	37	Mitchell Melton	Fr
S	38	Cameron Kittle	Fr
LB	39	Cody Simon	Fr
S	41	Josh Proctor	Jr
CB	42	Lloyd McFarquhar	Jr
S	43	Ryan Batsch	Jr
LB	44	Ben Schmiesing	Jr
LB	46	Cade Kacherski	Jr
LB	47	Justin Hilliard (C)	GS
LB	51	Trayvon Wilburn	Jr
DT	52	Antwuan Jackson	GS
DE	54	Tyler Friday	Jr
DT	55	Jerron Cage	Jr
DL	56	Aaron Cox	Sr
DT	57	Zaid Hamdan	Jr
DL	58	Ty Hamilton	Fr
DL	59	Darrion Henry-Young	Fr
DT	72	Tommy Togiai	Jr
DL	83	Cormontae Hamilton	Fr
DT	90	Jaden McKenzie	Fr
DT	92	Haskell Garrett	Sr
DL	93	Jacolbe Cowan	Fr
DE	97	Noah Potter	Fr

Special teams

Pos.	#	Name	Class
K	28	Dominic Dimaccio	Jr
P	29	Zach Hoover	Sr
LS	42	Bradley Robinson	Sr
P	91	Drue Chrisman	GS
LS	94	Roen McCullough	Jr
K	95	Blake Haubeil	Sr
P	96	Michael O'Shaughnessy	So
K	98	Jake Seibert	Fr

Head coach

- Ryan Day

Coordinators/assistant coaches

- Larry Johnson (associate head coach / defensive line)
- Greg Mattison (co-defensive coordinator)
- Kerry Coombs (co-defensive coordinator / secondary)
- Kevin Wilson (offensive coordinator / tight ends)
- Al Washington (linebackers)
- Tony Alford (assistant head coach for offense / running backs)
- Brian Hartline (wide receivers)
- Greg Studrawa (offensive line)
- Matt Barnes (special teams coordinator / safeties)
- Corey Dennis (quarterbacks)
- Billy Fessler (graduate assistant – offense)
- Kennedy Cook (graduate assistant – offense)
- Joe Bolden (graduate assistant – defense)
- Grayson Miller (graduate assistant – defense)
- Keenan Bailey (quality control coach – offense)
- Parker Fleming (quality control coach – special teams)
- Drew Christ (quality control coach – defense)
- Mickey Marotti (assistant athletic director / director of football)
- Gene Smith (vice-president / athletic director)

Legend

- (C) Team captain
- (S) Suspended
- (I) Ineligible
- Injured
- Redshirt

Roster

== Depth chart ==
Starters and backups.

Defense

FS
21 Marcus Williamson
12 Lathan Ransom

WLB	MLB	SLB
30 Pete Werner	33 Tuf Borland	47 Justin Hilliard
3 Teradja Mitchell	19 Dallas Gant	5 Baron Browning

S
41 Josh Proctor
23 Marcus Hooker

CB
7 Sevyn Banks
16 Ryan Watts

DE	DT	DT	DE
33 Zach Harrison	72 Tommy Togiai	92 Haskell Garrett	18 Jonathon Cooper
8 Javontae Jean-Baptiste	55 Jerron Cage	52 Antwuan Jackson	11 Tyreke Smith

CB
24 Shaun Wade
13 Tyreke Johnson

Offense

WR
2 Chris Olave
4 Julian Fleming

WR
6 Jameson Williams
11 Jaxon Smith-Njigba

LT	LG	C	RG	RT
75 Thayer Munford	55 Matthew Jones	71 Josh Myers	52 Wyatt Davis	78 Nicholas Petit-Frere
79 Dawand Jones	76 Harry Miller	53 Luke Wypler	66 Enokk Vimahi	77 Paris Johnson Jr.

TE
88 Jeremy Ruckert
89 Luke Farrell

WR
5 Garrett Wilson
13 Gee Scott Jr.

QB
1 Justin Fields
9 Jack Miller III

Special teams

RB
8 Trey Sermon
33 Master Teague
28 Miyan Williams

== Game summaries ==
=== Nebraska ===
Ohio State vs. Nebraska

Team	1	2	3	4	Total
Nebraska	7	7	3	0	17
• No. 5 Ohio State	14	10	14	14	52

- Date: October 24, 2020
- Location:
  Ohio Stadium
  Columbus, OH
- Game start: 12:02 p.m. EDT
- Elapsed time: 3:19
- Game attendance: 1,344
- Game weather: 46 °F (8 °C); Overcast; Wind N @ 8 mph
- Referee: Reggie Smith
- TV announcers (Fox): Gus Johnson, Joel Klatt, Jenny Taft

The No. 5 Ohio State Buckeyes defeated the Nebraska Cornhuskers 52–17, in what was both programs' season debut. Both programs were reportedly behind the movement to reinstate Big Ten Football in the Fall. The game was featured on Fox College Football's Big Noon Kickoff, with the hosts on location. The Ohio State Buckeyes were 27.5-point favorites.

Statistics	Nebraska	Ohio State
First downs	17	28
Plays–yards	56–377	69–498
Rushes–yards	36–217	48–222
Passing yards	160	276
Passing: comp–att–int	16–20–0	20–21–0
Turnovers		
Time of possession	26:46	33:14

Team	Category	Player	Statistics
Nebraska	Passing	Adrian Martinez	12–15, 105 yards
Nebraska	Rushing	Luke McCaffrey	19 carries, 87 yards
Nebraska	Receiving	Wan'Dale Robinson	6 receptions, 49 yards
Ohio State	Passing	Justin Fields	20–21, 276 yds, 2 TD
Ohio State	Rushing	Trey Sermon	11 carries, 55 yards
Ohio State	Receiving	Garrett Wilson	7 receptions, 129 yards, 1 TD

Scoring summary

Quarter	Time	Drive			Team	Scoring information	Score	
Quarter	Time	Plays	Yards	TOP	Team	Scoring information	Nebraska	Ohio State
1	13:09	4	76	1:51	Nebraska	Martinez 10-yard touchdown run, Culp kick good	7	0
1	8:04	11	75	5:05	Ohio State	Teague 1-yard touchdown run, Haubeil kick good	7	7
1	4:02	6	76	2:18	Ohio State	Wilson 42-yard touchdown reception from Fields, Haubeil kick good	7	14
2	8:24	11	78	5:17	Nebraska	Mills 3-yard touchdown run, Culp kick good	14	14
2	3:12	11	71	5:07	Ohio State	34-yard field goal by Haubeil	14	17
2	1:10	6	46	1:15	Ohio State	Teague 6-yard touchdown run, Haubeil kick good	14	24
3	11:24	8	75	3:36	Ohio State	Fields 17-yard touchdown run, Haubeil kick good	14	31
3	8:02	0	0	0:00	Ohio State	Fumble recovery returned 55 yards for touchdown by Banks, Haubeil kick good	14	38
3	3:56	9	72	4:00	Nebraska	22-yard field goal by Culp	17	38
4	9:58	7	42	3:18	Ohio State	Smith-Njigba 5-yard touchdown reception from Fields, Haubeil kick good	17	45
4	0:18	6	40	2:35	Ohio State	Miller III 2-yard touchdown run, Haubeil kick good	17	52
"TOP" = time of possession. For other American football terms, see Glossary of American football.							17	52

=== At No. 18 Penn State ===
No. 3 Ohio State at No. 18 Penn State

Team	1	2	3	4	Total
• No. 3 Ohio State	14	7	10	7	38
No. 18 Penn State	3	3	7	12	25

- Date: October 31, 2020
- Location:
  Beaver Stadium
  University Park, PA
- Game start: 7:44 p.m. EDT
- Elapsed time: 3:44
- Game attendance: 1,500
- Game weather: 40 °F (4 °C); Mostly Clear; Wind NNE@ 10 mph.
- Referee: Jerry McGinn
- TV announcers (ABC): Chris Fowler, Kirk Herbstreit, Maria Taylor

The No. 3 Ohio State Buckeyes defeated the No. 18 Penn State Nittany Lions 38–25 in their annual rivalry game. It was the first time since 2009, that Penn State hosted Ohio State without the White Out due to crowd restrictions from the COVID-19 pandemic. The game was featured on ESPN Saturday Night Football on ABC and hosted the College GameDay. The Ohio State Buckeyes were 10.5 point favorites.

Justin Fields was named co–Offensive Player of the Week for the Big Ten for completing 28 of 34 passing attempts for 318 yards and four touchdowns. Defensive tackle Tommy Togiai was named Big Ten Defensive Player of the Week for his performance which included seven tackles and three sacks.

Statistics	Ohio State	Penn State
First downs	24	20
Plays–yards	79–526	57–325
Rushes–yards	208	44
Passing yards	318	281
Passing: comp–att–int	28–34–0	18–30–1
Turnovers		
Time of possession	37:01	22:59

Team	Category	Player	Statistics
Ohio State	Passing	Justin Fields	28–34, 318 yards, 4 TD
Ohio State	Rushing	Master Teague	23 carries, 110 yards, 1 TD
Ohio State	Receiving	Chris Olave	7 receptions, 120 yards, 2 TD
Penn State	Passing	Sean Clifford	18–30, 281 yards, 3 TD, 1 INT
Penn State	Rushing	Devyn Ford	8 carries, 36 yards
Penn State	Receiving	Jahan Dotson	8 receptions, 144 yds, 3 TD

Scoring summary

Quarter	Time	Drive			Team	Scoring information	Score	
Quarter	Time	Plays	Yards	TOP	Team	Scoring information	Ohio State	Penn State
1	13:43	3	75	1:17	Ohio State	Teague 4-yard touchdown run, Haubeil kick good	7	0
1	8:39	5	45	2:42	Ohio State	Olave 26-yard touchdown reception from Fields, Haubeil kick good	14	0
1	2:57	11	61	5:42	Penn State	31-yard field goal by Pinegar	14	3
2	2:23	15	89	6:06	Ohio State	Ruckert 26-yard touchdown reception from Fields, DiMaccio kick good	21	3
2	0:00	1	0	0:01	Penn State	50-yard field goal by Stout	21	6
3	11:14	8	75	3:46	Penn State	Dotson 14-yard touchdown reception from Clifford, Pinegar kick good	21	13
3	8:41	8	75	2:33	Ohio State	Olave 49-yard touchdown reception from Fields, DiMaccio kick good	28	13
3	1:02	12	65	6:02	Ohio State	22-yard field goal by DiMaccio	31	13
4	14:30	5	75	1:32	Penn State	Dotson 21-yard touchdown reception from Clifford, 2-point run failed	31	19
4	9:14	12	75	5:16	Ohio State	Ruckert 1-yard touchdown reception from Fields, DiMaccio kick good	38	19
4	6:27	7	75	2:47	Penn State	Dotson 20-yard touchdown reception from Clifford, 2-point pass failed	38	25
"TOP" = time of possession. For other American football terms, see Glossary of American football.							38	25

=== Rutgers ===
No. 3 Ohio State vs. Rutgers

Team	1	2	3	4	Total
Rutgers	3	0	6	18	27
• No. 3 Ohio State	7	28	7	7	49

- Date: November 7, 2020
- Location:
  Ohio Stadium
  Columbus, OH
- Game start: 7:30 p.m. EST
- Game attendance: 1,275
- TV announcers (BTN): Brandon Gaudin, James Laurinaitis, Rick Pizzo

The No. 3 Ohio State Buckeyes defeated the Rutgers Scarlet Knights 49–27. The game was featured on BTN. The Ohio State Buckeyes were 37.5 point favorites.

Statistics	Rutgers	Ohio State
First downs	22	25
Plays–yards	81–373	65–517
Rushes–yards	141	203
Passing yards	232	314
Passing: comp–att–int	34–49–0	24–28–0
Turnovers		
Time of possession	28:51	31:09

Team	Category	Player	Statistics
Rutgers	Passing	Noah Vedral	22–33, 168 yards
Rutgers	Rushing	Isiah Pacheco	7 carries, 68 yards
Rutgers	Receiving	Bo Melton	7 receptions, 86 yards
Ohio State	Passing	Justin Fields	24–28, 314 yards, 5 TD
Ohio State	Rushing	Trey Sermon	12 carries, 68 yards
Ohio State	Receiving	Garrett Wilson	6 receptions, 104 yards, 1 TD

Scoring summary

Quarter	Time	Drive			Team	Scoring information	Score	
Quarter	Time	Plays	Yards	TOP	Team	Scoring information	Rutgers	Ohio State
{{{Quarter}}}					{{{Team}}}		{{{Visitor}}}	{{{Home}}}
"TOP" = time of possession. For other American football terms, see Glossary of American football.							27	49

=== At Maryland (Cancelled) ===
No. 3 Ohio State at Maryland (Cancelled)

Team	1	2	3	4	Total
~~No. 3 Ohio State~~	0	0	0	0	0
~~Maryland~~	0	0	0	0	0

- Date: ~~November 14, 2020~~
- Location:
  ~~Maryland Stadium~~
  ~~College Park, MD~~
- Game start: ~~3:30 p.m. EST~~
- Television network: ~~BTN~~

The Ohio State at Maryland game was canceled due to a COVID-19 outbreak within the Maryland football program. The game was not rescheduled; instead, both teams had a bye.

Statistics	Ohio State	Maryland
First downs	–	–
Plays–yards	–	–
Rushes–yards	–	–
Passing yards	–	–
Passing: comp–att–int	–	–
Turnovers		
Time of possession	–	–

Team	Category	Player	Statistics
Ohio State	Passing	–	–
Ohio State	Rushing	–	–
Ohio State	Receiving	–	–
Maryland	Passing	–	–
Maryland	Rushing	–	–
Maryland	Receiving	–	–

Scoring summary

Quarter	Time	Drive			Team	Scoring information	Score	
Quarter	Time	Plays	Yards	TOP	Team	Scoring information	Ohio State	Maryland
{{{Quarter}}}					{{{Team}}}		{{{Visitor}}}	{{{Home}}}
"TOP" = time of possession. For other American football terms, see Glossary of American football.								

=== No. 9 Indiana ===
No. 3 Ohio State vs. No. 9 Indiana

Team	1	2	3	4	Total
No. 9 Indiana	0	7	14	14	35
• No. 3 Ohio State	7	21	14	0	42

- Date: November 21, 2020
- Location:
  Ohio Stadium
  Columbus, OH
- Game start: 12:06 p.m. EST
- Elapsed time: 3:45
- Game attendance: 635
- Game weather: 46 °F (8 °C); Cloudy, light rain: Winds NNW 11 mph;
- TV announcers (Fox): Gus Johnson, Joel Klatt, Jenny Taft

The No. 3 Ohio State Buckeyes defeated the No. 9 Indiana Hoosiers 42–35. The game was featured on Fox College Football's Big Noon Kickoff. The Ohio State Buckeyes were 21 point favorites.

Statistics	Indiana	Ohio State
First downs	19	27
Plays–yards	–490	–607
Rushes–yards	16–1	50–307
Passing yards	491	300
Passing: comp–att–int	27–51–1	18–30–3
Turnovers		
Time of possession	22:36	36:24

Team	Category	Player	Statistics
Indiana	Passing	Michael Penix Jr.	27/51, 491 yards, 5 TD, INT
Indiana	Rushing	Sampson James	3 carries, 10 yards
Indiana	Receiving	Ty Fryfogle	7 receptions, 218 yards, 3 TD
Ohio State	Passing	Justin Fields	18/30, 300 yards, 2 TD, 3 INT
Ohio State	Rushing	Master Teague	26 carries, 169 yards, 2 TD
Ohio State	Receiving	Garrett Wilson	7 receptions, 169 yards, 2 TD

Scoring summary

Quarter	Time	Drive			Team	Scoring information	Score	
Quarter	Time	Plays	Yards	TOP	Team	Scoring information	Indiana	Ohio State
{{{Quarter}}}					{{{Team}}}		{{{Visitor}}}	{{{Home}}}
"TOP" = time of possession. For other American football terms, see Glossary of American football.								

=== At Illinois (Cancelled) ===
No. 4 Ohio State at Illinois (Cancelled)

Team	1	2	3	4	Total
~~No. 4 Ohio State~~	0	0	0	0	0
~~Illinois~~	0	0	0	0	0

- Date: ~~November 28, 2020~~
- Location:
  ~~Memorial Stadium~~
  ~~Champaign, IL~~
- Game start: ~~12:00 p.m. EST~~
- Television network: ~~FS1~~

The No. 4 Ohio State at Illinois game was canceled due to a COVID-19 outbreak within the Ohio State football program. The game was to be rescheduled; instead, both teams had a bye.

Statistics	Ohio State	Illinois
First downs	–	–
Plays–yards	–	–
Rushes–yards	–	–
Passing yards	–	–
Passing: comp–att–int	–	–
Turnovers		
Time of possession	–	–

Team	Category	Player	Statistics
Ohio State	Passing	–	–
Ohio State	Rushing	–	–
Ohio State	Receiving	–	–
Illinois	Passing	–	–
Illinois	Rushing	–	–
Illinois	Receiving	–	–

Scoring summary

Quarter	Time	Drive			Team	Scoring information	Score	
Quarter	Time	Plays	Yards	TOP	Team	Scoring information	Ohio State	Illinois
{{{Quarter}}}					{{{Team}}}		{{{Visitor}}}	{{{Home}}}
"TOP" = time of possession. For other American football terms, see Glossary of American football.								

=== At Michigan State ===
No. 4 Ohio State at Michigan State

Team	1	2	3	4	Total
• No. 4 Ohio State	14	14	10	14	52
Michigan State	0	0	7	5	12

- Date: December 5, 2020
- Location:
  Spartan Stadium
  East Lansing, MI
- Game start: 12:06 p.m. EST
- Elapsed time: 3:39
- Game attendance: 0
- Game weather: 34 °F (1 °C), Cloudy, NNW 4 miles per hour (6.4 km/h)
- Referee: Larry Smith
- TV announcers (ABC): Chris Fowler, Kirk Herbstreit, Maria Taylor

The No. 4 Ohio State Buckeyes defeated the Michigan State Spartans 52–12. The game was featured on ESPN College Football on ABC. The Ohio State Buckeyes were 24 point favorites. Ohio State head coach Ryan Day did not coach due to COVID-19 protocols after a positive COVID-19 test. Instead, associate head coach Larry Johnson was acting head coach, serving as the first black head coach in Buckeye football history.

Statistics	Ohio State	Michigan State
First downs	26	13
Plays–yards	72–521	64–261
Rushes–yards	48–322	28–81
Passing yards	199	180
Passing: comp–att–int	17–24–0	21–36–2
Turnovers		
Time of possession	32:47	27:13

Team	Category	Player	Statistics
Ohio State	Passing	Justin Fields	17/24, 199 yards, 2 TD
Ohio State	Rushing	Trey Sermon	10 carries, 112 yards, TD
Ohio State	Receiving	Chris Olave	10 receptions, 139 yards, TD
Michigan State	Passing	Payton Thorne	16/25, 147 yards, INT
Michigan State	Rushing	Payton Thorne	9 carries, 42 yards, TD
Michigan State	Receiving	Jayden Reed	5 receptions, 79 yards

Scoring summary

Quarter	Time	Drive			Team	Scoring information	Score	
Quarter	Time	Plays	Yards	TOP	Team	Scoring information	Ohio State	Michigan State
{{{Quarter}}}					{{{Team}}}		{{{Visitor}}}	{{{Home}}}
"TOP" = time of possession. For other American football terms, see Glossary of American football.							52	12

=== Michigan (Cancelled) ===
No. 4 Ohio State vs. Michigan (Cancelled)

Team	1	2	3	4	Total
~~Michigan~~	0	0	0	0	0
~~No. 4 Ohio State~~	0	0	0	0	0

- Date: ~~December 12, 2020~~
- Location:
  ~~Ohio Stadium~~
  ~~Columbus, OH~~
- Game start: ~~12:00 p.m. EST~~
- Television network: ~~Fox~~

The Michigan at No. 4 Ohio State game was canceled due to a COVID-19 outbreak within the Michigan football program. The game was not rescheduled.

Statistics	Michigan	Ohio State
First downs		
Plays–yards		
Rushes–yards		
Passing yards		
Passing: comp–att–int		
Turnovers		
Time of possession		

Team	Category	Player	Statistics
Michigan	Passing		
Michigan	Rushing		
Michigan	Receiving		
Ohio State	Passing		
Ohio State	Rushing		
Ohio State	Receiving		

Scoring summary

Quarter	Time	Drive			Team	Scoring information	Score	
Quarter	Time	Plays	Yards	TOP	Team	Scoring information	Michigan	Ohio State
{{{Quarter}}}					{{{Team}}}		{{{Visitor}}}	{{{Home}}}
"TOP" = time of possession. For other American football terms, see Glossary of American football.								

=== Vs. No. 14 Northwestern ===
No. 4 Ohio State vs. No. 14 Northwestern
(Big Ten Championship)

Team	1	2	3	4	Total
No. 14 Northwestern	7	3	0	0	10
• No. 4 Ohio State	3	3	7	9	22

- Date: December 19, 2020
- Location: Lucas Oil Stadium
  Indianapolis, IN
- Game start: 12:18 p.m. EST
- Elapsed time: 3:45
- Game attendance: 3,178
- Game weather: n/a (game played indoors)
- Referee: Mark Kluczynski
- TV announcers (Fox): Gus Johnson, Joel Klatt, Jenny Taft

The No. 4 Ohio State Buckeyes defeated the No. 14 Northwestern Wildcats 22–10 in the Big Ten Championship Game. The Ohio State Buckeyes were 16.5 point favorites.

Statistics	Northwestern	Ohio State
First downs	19	24
Plays–yards	71–329	71–513
Rushes–yards	34–105	44–399
Passing yards	224	114
Passing: comp–att–int	24–37–2	12–27–2
Turnovers		
Time of possession	28:40	31:20

Team	Category	Player	Statistics
Northwestern	Passing	Peyton Ramsey	24/37, 224 yards, 2 INT
Northwestern	Rushing	Cam Porter	16 carries, 61 yards, 1 TD
Northwestern	Receiving	Ramaud Chiaokhiao-Bowman	8 receptions, 103 yards
Ohio State	Passing	Justin Fields	12/27, 114 yards, 2 INT
Ohio State	Rushing	Trey Sermon	29 carries, 331 yards, 2 TD
Ohio State	Receiving	Julian Fleming	4 receptions, 53 yards

Scoring summary

Quarter	Time	Drive			Team	Scoring information	Score	
Quarter	Time	Plays	Yards	TOP	Team	Scoring information	Northwestern	Ohio State
{{{Quarter}}}					{{{Team}}}		{{{Visitor}}}	{{{Home}}}
"TOP" = time of possession. For other American football terms, see Glossary of American football.								

=== Vs. No. 2 Clemson ===
No. 3 Ohio State vs. No. 2 Clemson
(Sugar Bowl–CFP semifinal)

Team	1	2	3	4	Total
• No. 3 Ohio State	14	21	7	7	49
No. 2 Clemson	14	0	7	7	28

- Date: January 1, 2021
- Location: Mercedes-Benz Superdome
  New Orleans, LA
- Game start: 7:16 p.m. CST
- Elapsed time: 3:50
- Game attendance: 3,000
- Game weather: n/a (game played indoors)
- Referee: David Alvarez (Big 12)
- TV announcers (ESPN): Chris Fowler, Kirk Herbstreit, Maria Taylor

The No. 3 Ohio State Buckeyes defeated the No. 2 Clemson Tigers 49–28 in the Sugar Bowl at the Mercedes-Benz Superdome in New Orleans, Louisiana. The Ohio State Buckeyes were 7 point underdogs to the Clemson Tigers.

Statistics	Ohio State	Clemson
First downs	26	23
Plays–yards	72–639	70–444
Rushes–yards	44–254	22–44
Passing yards	385	400
Passing: comp–att–int	22–28–1	33–48–1
Turnovers		
Time of possession	34:05	25:55

Team	Category	Player	Statistics
Ohio State	Passing	Justin Fields	22/28, 385 yards, 6 TD, 1 INT
Ohio State	Rushing	Trey Sermon	31 carries, 193 yards, 1 TD
Ohio State	Receiving	Chris Olave	6 receptions, 132 yards, 2 TD
Clemson	Passing	Trevor Lawrence	33/48, 400 yards, 2 TD, 1 INT
Clemson	Rushing	Travis Etienne	10 carries, 32 yards, 1 TD
Clemson	Receiving	Cornell Powell	8 receptions, 139 yards, 2 TD

Scoring summary

Quarter	Time	Drive			Team	Scoring information	Score	
Quarter	Time	Plays	Yards	TOP	Team	Scoring information	Ohio State	Clemson
{{{Quarter}}}					{{{Team}}}		{{{Visitor}}}	{{{Home}}}
"TOP" = time of possession. For other American football terms, see Glossary of American football.								

=== Vs. No. 1 Alabama ===
No. 3 Ohio State vs. No. 1 Alabama
(CFP National Championship)

Team	1	2	3	4	Total
No. 3 Ohio State	7	10	7	0	24
• No. 1 Alabama	7	28	10	7	52

- Date: January 11, 2021
- Location: Hard Rock Stadium
  Miami Gardens, FL
- Game start: 8:00 p.m. EST
- Game attendance: 14,926
- Game weather: n/a (game played indoors)
- Referee: Brandon Cruse (Big 12)
- TV announcers: Chris Fowler, Kirk Herbstreit, Maria Taylor, Allison Williams

The No. 3 Ohio State Buckeyes lost to the No. 1 Alabama Crimson Tide in the CFP National Championship at the Hard Rock Stadium in Miami Gardens, Florida. Ohio State entered the game as 8.5 point underdogs.

Statistics	Ohio State	Alabama
First downs	19	33
Plays–yards	62-341	83-621
Rushes–yards	29-147	38-157
Passing yards	194	464
Passing: comp–att–int	17-33-0	36-45-0
Turnovers		
Time of possession	22:34	37:26

Team	Category	Player	Statistics
Ohio State	Passing	Justin Fields	17/33, 194 yards, 1 TD
Ohio State	Rushing	Justin Fields	6 carries, 67 yards
Ohio State	Receiving	Chris Olave	8 receptions, 69 yards
Alabama	Passing	Mac Jones	36/45, 464 yards, 5 TD
Alabama	Rushing	Najee Harris	22 carries, 79 yards, 2 TD
Alabama	Receiving	DeVonta Smith	12 receptions, 215 yards, 3 TD

Scoring summary

Quarter	Time	Drive			Team	Scoring information	Score	
Quarter	Time	Plays	Yards	TOP	Team	Scoring information	Ohio State	Alabama
{{{Quarter}}}					{{{Team}}}		{{{Visitor}}}	{{{Home}}}
"TOP" = time of possession. For other American football terms, see Glossary of American football.								

== Awards and honors ==
Weekly Awards
Player	Award	Date Awarded	Ref.
Justin Fields	Big Ten co–Offensive Player of the Week	November 2, 2020	
Tommy Togiai	Big Ten Defensive Player of the Week	November 2, 2020	

== Players drafted into the NFL ==
Round	Pick	Player	Position	NFL Club
1	11	Justin Fields	QB	Chicago Bears
2	60	Pete Werner	LB	New Orleans Saints
2	62	Josh Myers	C	Green Bay Packers
3	86	Wyatt Davis	G	Minnesota Vikings
3	88	Trey Sermon	RB	San Francisco 49ers
3	105	Baron Browning	LB	Denver Broncos
4	132	Tommy Togiai	DT	Cleveland Browns
5	145	Luke Farrell	TE	Jacksonville Jaguars
5	160	Shaun Wade	DB	Baltimore Ravens
7	239	Jonathon Cooper	DE	Denver Broncos
