= Justin Hilliard =

American football player (born 1997)

Profile
- Position: Linebacker

Personal information
- Born: March 25, 1997 (age 29); Cincinnati, Ohio, U.S.
- Listed height: 6 ft 1 in (1.85 m)
- Listed weight: 231 lb (105 kg)

Career information
- High school: St. Xavier (Cincinnati, Ohio)
- College: Ohio State
- NFL draft: 2021: undrafted

Career history
- San Francisco 49ers (2021)*; New York Giants (2021); Kansas City Chiefs (2022)*
- * Offseason or practice squad member only

Career NFL statistics
- Games played: 2
- Stats at Pro Football Reference

Justin Hilliard (born March 25, 1997) is an American professional football linebacker. He played college football at Ohio State and was signed as an undrafted free agent by the San Francisco 49ers after the 2021 NFL draft.

== Early life and college ==
Hilliard graduated from St. Xavier High School in Cincinnati in 2015.

Hilliard was ranked as a five–star recruit and one of the best linebackers in the 2015 class by 247Sports.com coming out of high school. He committed to Ohio State on July 2, 2014. He requested and was approved for a sixth year of eligibility before the 2020 season.

== Professional career ==
Pre-draft measurables
| Height | Weight | Arm length | Hand span | 40-yard dash | 10-yard split | 20-yard split | 20-yard shuttle | Three-cone drill | Vertical jump | Broad jump | Bench press |
|---|---|---|---|---|---|---|---|---|---|---|---|
| 6 ft 0 1/2 in (1.84 m) | 229 lb (104 kg) | 31 3/8 in (0.80 m) | 8 7/8 in (0.23 m) | 4.81 s | 1.68 s | 2.80 s | 4.39 s | 7.21 s | 34.5 in (0.88 m) | 9 ft 8 in (2.95 m) | 27 reps |
All values from Pro Day

=== San Francisco 49ers ===
Hilliard was signed as an undrafted free agent by the San Francisco 49ers on May 13, 2021. He was waived on August 31, 2021.

=== New York Giants ===
On September 1, 2021, Hilliard was claimed off waivers by the New York Giants. He was placed on injured reserve on October 15, 2021.

On June 17, 2022, Hilliard was suspended for the first two games of the 2022 regular season for violating the NFL's policy on performance-enhancing substances. On July 28, 2022, Hilliard was waived.

=== Kansas City Chiefs ===
On December 28, 2022, Hilliard was signed to the Kansas City Chiefs practice squad. Hilliard was waived by the Chiefs on January 6, 2023, after Matthew Wright was signed to the practice squad.
