= Jonathon Cooper =

American football player (born 1998)

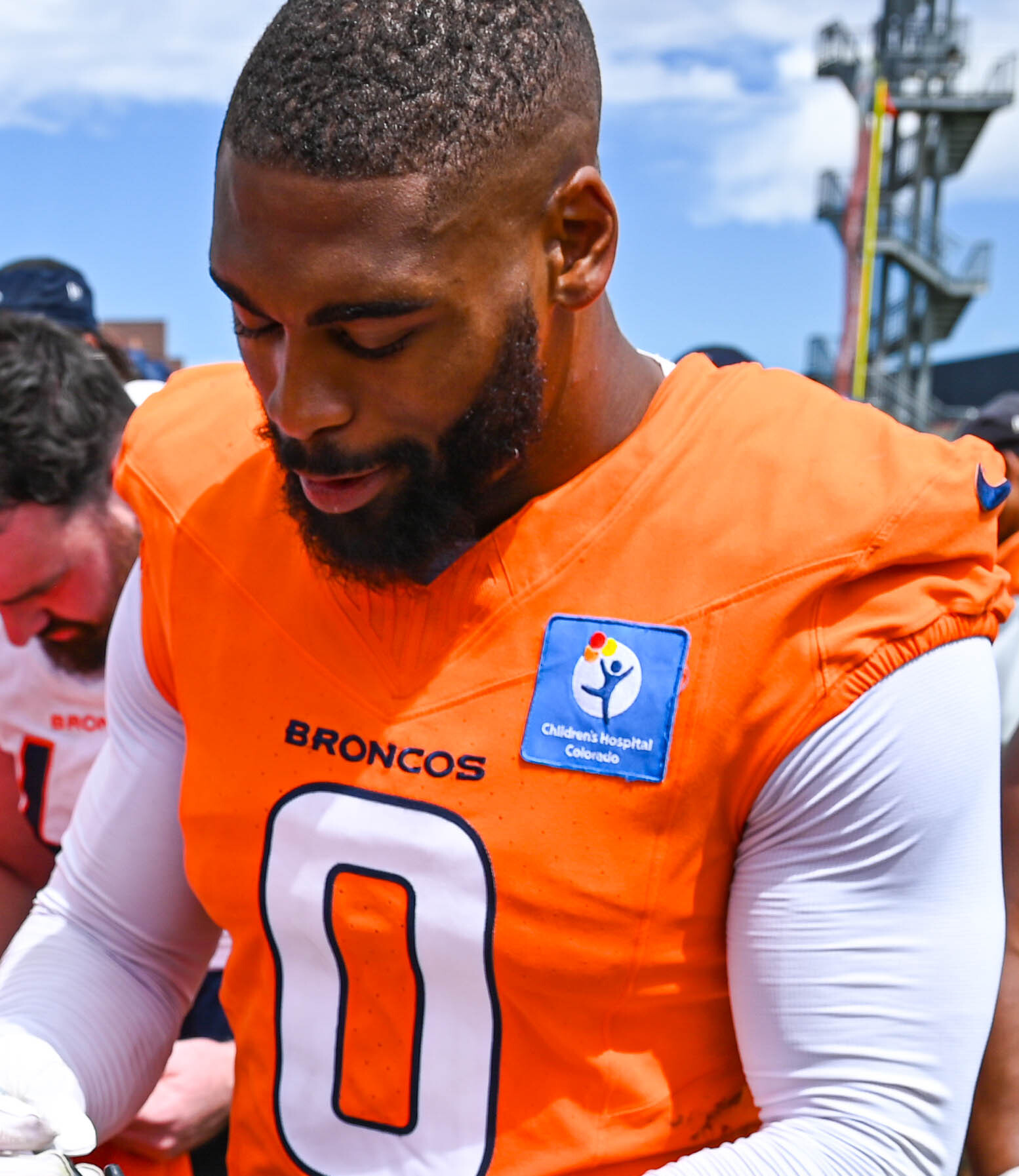
- Cooper with the Denver Broncos in 2024

No. 0 – Denver Broncos
- Position: Outside linebacker
- Roster status: Active

Personal information
- Born: January 8, 1998 (age 28); Gahanna, Ohio, U.S.
- Listed height: 6 ft 4 in (1.93 m)
- Listed weight: 257 lb (117 kg)

Career information
- High school: Lincoln (Gahanna)
- College: Ohio State (2016–2020)
- NFL draft: 2021: 7th round, 239th overall pick

Career history
- Denver Broncos (2021–present)

Awards and highlights
- Second-team All-American (2020); Third-team All-Big Ten (2020)

Career NFL statistics as of 2025
- Tackles: 266
- Sacks: 31.5
- Forced fumbles: 2
- Fumble recoveries: 3
- Pass deflections: 7
- Interceptions: 1
- Touchdowns: 1
- Stats at Pro Football Reference

Jonathon Cooper (born January 8, 1998) is an American professional football outside linebacker for the Denver Broncos of the National Football League (NFL). He played college football for the Ohio State Buckeyes.

== Early life ==
Cooper was born on January 8, 1998, in Gahanna, Ohio. His mother, Jessica Moorman, who was 17 years old at the time, was a high school student with college aspirations who worked a part-time job at an accounting firm. Initially, Moorman felt she was not ready for the responsibility of raising a child and planned to put Cooper up for adoption. However, after Cooper was born nine weeks premature and weighing only 4 pounds, she decided to raise him herself. After spending two months with Cooper in the intensive care unit, she would go on to graduate from high school and earn her college degree.

Cooper began playing football at 6 years old, citing his mother's work ethic as a primary inspiration. Prior to beginning high school at Gahanna-Lincoln, Cooper and his mother created a workout circuit for him in their basement.

During his freshman year, Cooper was diagnosed with Wolff–Parkinson–White syndrome, a rare heart condition that often manifests in an abnormally fast heartbeat.

== College career ==
Cooper played college football at Ohio State University from 2016 to 2020. Over 45 games during his career, he had 75 tackles and 10 sacks. Cooper was the first Ohio State player to ever wear the number 0, which was awarded to him for his leadership qualities.

== Professional career ==
Pre-draft measurables
Height	Weight	Arm length	Hand span	Wingspan	40-yard dash	10-yard split	20-yard split	20-yard shuttle	Three-cone drill	Vertical jump	Broad jump	Bench press
6 ft 2 5/8 in (1.90 m)	253 lb (115 kg)	32 1/8 in (0.82 m)	9 5/8 in (0.24 m)	6 ft 5 1/4 in (1.96 m)	4.71 s	1.65 s	2.78 s	4.31 s	7.02 s	33.0 in (0.84 m)	9 ft 0 in (2.74 m)	28 reps
All values from Pro Day

Two days before the NFL draft, doctors discovered an atrial fibrillation in Cooper's heart. His heart rhythm was particularly abnormal, and would ultimately require three separate heart procedures to treat.

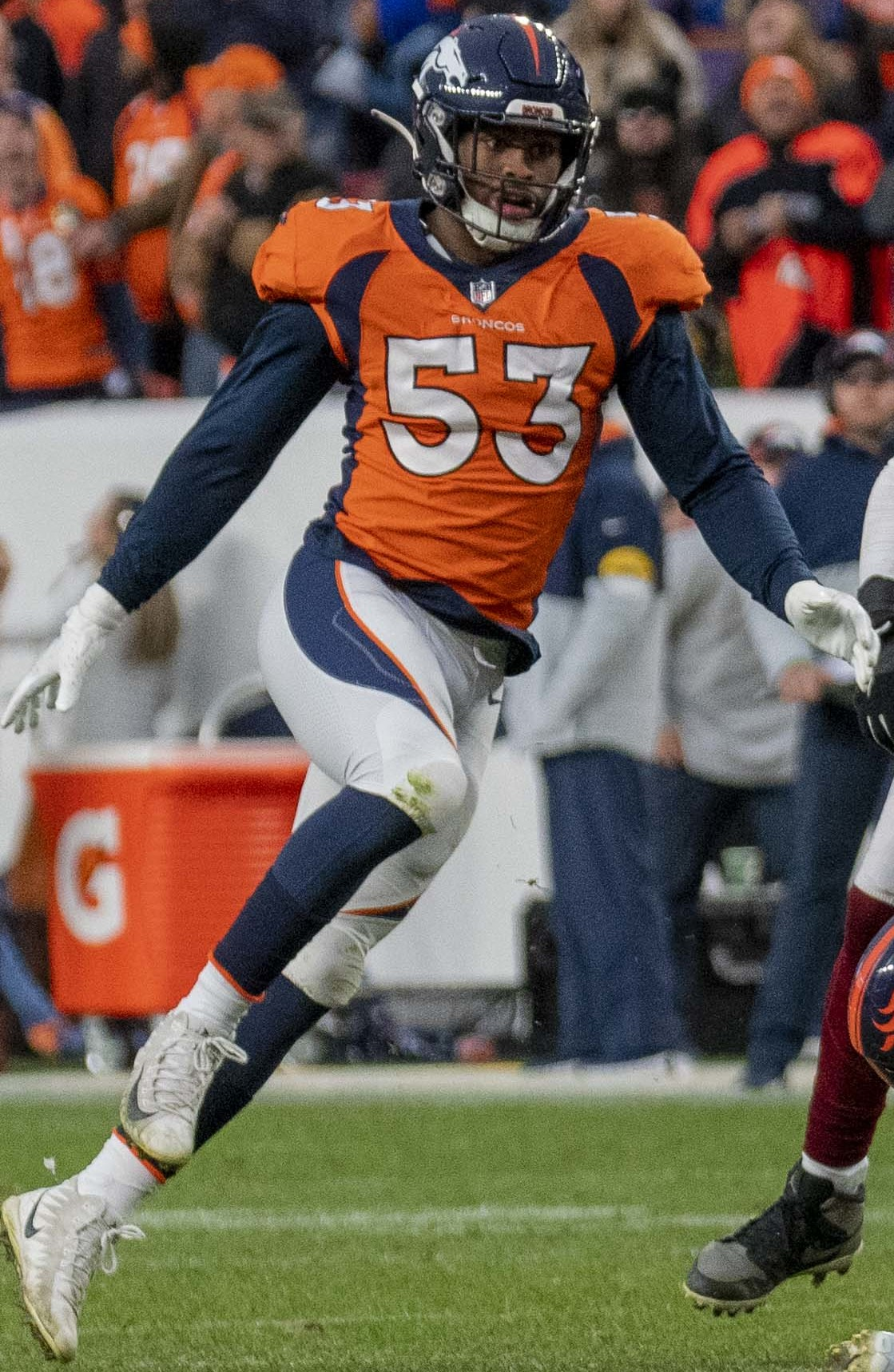
Cooper with the Broncos in 2021

Heading into the 2021 NFL draft, Cooper expected to be picked somewhere between the third and fifth rounds. However, his health complications caused him to fall to the seventh round, where he was eventually drafted 239th overall by the Denver Broncos. Broncos general manager George Paton commented that he and his staff were aware of Cooper's health complications, but were enamored by his motor and leadership.

After missing rookie minicamp, OTAs, and mandatory minicamp due to the heart procedures, Cooper was finally cleared to attend training camp after being sidelined for a month. On June 15, 2021, he signed his four-year rookie contract with the Broncos.

Ahead of the 2023 season, Cooper changed his jersey number from 53 to 0, the number he wore at Ohio State. Cooper lead the Broncos in sacks in 2023, with eight and a half.

On November 4, 2024, Cooper signed a four-year, $60 million extension with the Broncos after starting the season with five and a half sacks through nine games. He would have his first double-digit sack season by the end of 2024, with 10.5 total sacks recorded.

On March 21, 2025, Cooper's contract was restructured to clear cap space. Cooper was named AFC Defensive Player of the Week for Week 6 after recording 2.0 sacks in a win against the New York Jets.

On August 30, 2026, Cooper was placed on the commissioner's exempt list due to his ongoing domestic violence charges. On October 16, he was removed from the exempt list and approved to return to play.

== NFL career statistics ==
Legend
	Led the league
**Bold**	Career high

=== Regular season ===
Year	Team	Games		Tackles					Interceptions						Fumbles				
Year	Team	GP	GS	Cmb	Solo	Ast	Sck	TFL	Int	Yds	Avg	Lng	TD	PD	FF	Fum	FR	Yds	TD
2021	DEN	16	5	38	22	16	2.5	4	0	0	0.0	0	0	0	0	0	1	0	0
2022	DEN	14	9	48	23	25	2.0	2	0	0	0.0	0	0	0	0	0	0	0	0
2023	DEN	17	17	**72**	**44**	**28**	8.5	8	**1**	**4**	**4.0**	**4**	0	2	**1**	0	**2**	**35**	**1**
2024	DEN	17	17	58	33	25	**10.5**	**11**	0	0	0.0	0	0	1	**1**	0	0	0	0
2025	DEN	17	17	50	23	27	8.0	8	0	0	0.0	0	0	**4**	0	0	0	0	0
Career		81	65	266	145	121	31.5	33	1	4	4.0	4	0	7	2	0	3	35	1

=== Postseason ===
Year	Team	Games		Tackles					Interceptions						Fumbles				
Year	Team	GP	GS	Cmb	Solo	Ast	Sck	TFL	Int	Yds	Avg	Lng	TD	PD	FF	Fum	FR	Yds	TD
2024	DEN	1	1	3	1	**2**	0.0	0	0	0	0.0	0	0	0	0	0	0	0	0
2025	DEN	2	2	**4**	**4**	0	**1.0**	**1**	0	0	0.0	0	0	0	0	0	0	0	0
Career		3	3	7	5	2	1.0	1	0	0	0.0	0	0	0	0	0	0	0	0

== Legal issues ==
On June 5, 2026, Cooper and his girlfriend were arrested and held on suspicion of two counts of domestic violence and one count of criminal mischief. The arrest occurred after an argument and physical confrontation that began over cheating allegations and included both of their cellphones being damaged. Cooper allegedly bit into his girlfriend's phone, causing disabling damage to it. The same day, Cooper appeared in court and was released on personal recognizance. On June 8, Cooper appeared in court, where he pleaded not guilty to all charges. A motions hearing was June 6, 2026. Cooper's jury trial was also scheduled to start on July 22, 2026. On June 11, Cooper was arrested again and charged with two additional counts of domestic violence, one for harassment via repeated phone calls and one for violating a restraining order.
