= 2020 Northwestern Wildcats football team =

American college football season

2020 Northwestern Wildcats football

Big Ten West Division champion Citrus Bowl champion

Big Ten Championship Game, L 10–22 vs. Ohio State

Citrus Bowl, W 35–19 vs. Auburn
- Conference: Big Ten Conference
- West Division

Ranking
- Coaches: No. 10
- AP: No. 10
- Record: 7–2 (6–1 Big Ten)
- Head coach: Pat Fitzgerald (15th season)
- Offensive coordinator: Mike Bajakian (1st season)
- Offensive scheme: Spread
- Defensive coordinator: Mike Hankwitz (13th season)
- Base defense: Multiple 4–3
- Home stadium: Ryan Field

Uniform
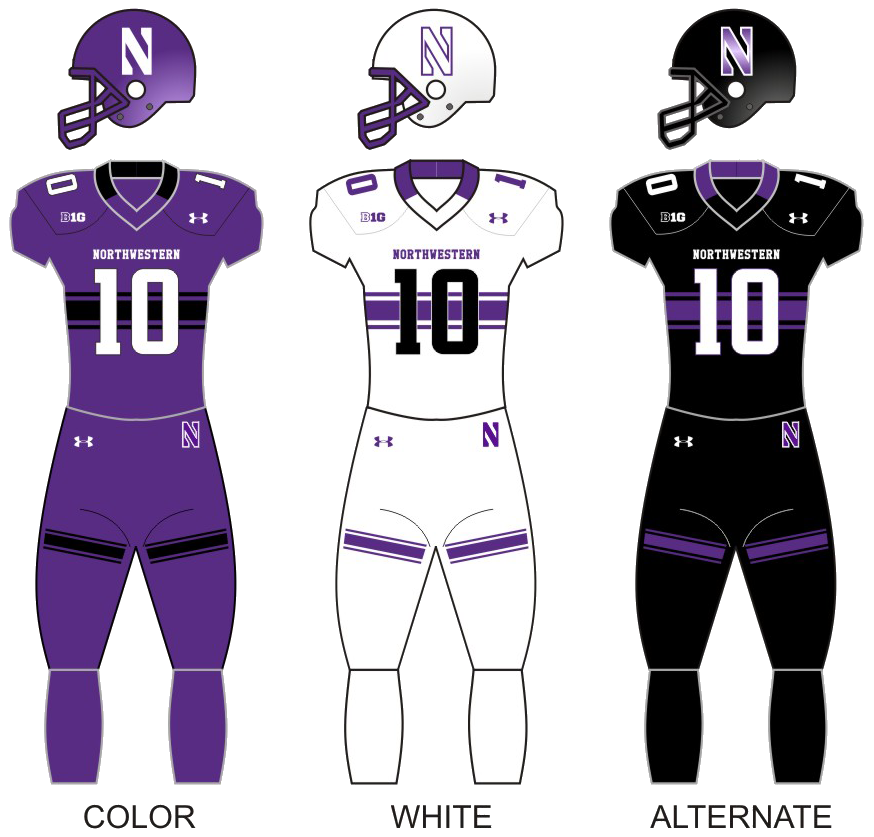

2020 Big Ten Conference football standings
	Conf.			Overall
Team	W		L	W		L
East Division
No. 2 Ohio State xy$^	5	–	0	7	–	1
No. 12 Indiana	6	–	1	6	–	2
Penn State	4	–	5	4	–	5
Maryland	2	–	3	2	–	3
Rutgers	3	–	6	3	–	6
Michigan	2	–	4	2	–	4
Michigan State	2	–	5	2	–	5
West Division
No. 10 Northwestern xy	6	–	1	7	–	2
No. 16 Iowa	6	–	2	6	–	2
Wisconsin	3	–	3	4	–	3
Minnesota	3	–	4	3	–	4
Nebraska	3	–	5	3	–	5
Purdue	2	–	4	2	–	4
Illinois	2	–	6	2	–	6
Championship: Ohio State 22, Northwestern 10
^ – College Football Playoff participant; $ – Conference champion; x – Division champion/co-champions; y – Championship game participant; Note: Due to COVID-19, the Big Ten suspended the season on August 11, but later decided to begin play on October 24. In addition to the title game that was played on December 19, the conference seeded all remaining teams for "championship week" games.; Rankings from AP Poll.

The 2020 Northwestern Wildcats football team represented Northwestern University during the 2020 NCAA Division I FBS football season. The Wildcats played their home games at Ryan Field in Evanston, Illinois, and competed in the West Division of the Big Ten Conference. They were led by 15th-year head coach Pat Fitzgerald.

On August 11, 2020, the Big Ten Conference canceled all fall sports competitions due to the COVID-19 pandemic. However, on September 16, the Big Ten reinstated the season, announcing an eight-game season beginning on October 24.

== Schedule ==
Northwestern had games scheduled against Tulane, Central Michigan, and Morgan State, but canceled these games on July 9 due to the Big Ten Conference's decision to play a conference-only schedule due to the COVID-19 pandemic.

Date	Time	Opponent	Rank	Site	TV	Result	Attendance
October 24, 2020	6:30 p.m.	Maryland		Ryan Field; Evanston, IL	BTN	W 43–3	0
October 31	2:30 p.m.	at Iowa		Kinnick Stadium; Iowa City, IA	ESPN	W 21–20	1,432
November 7	11:00 a.m.	Nebraska		Ryan Field; Evanston, IL	BTN	W 21–13	0
November 14	6:30 p.m.	at Purdue	No. 23	Ross–Ade Stadium; West Lafayette, IN	BTN	W 27–20	886
November 21	2:30 p.m.	No. 10 Wisconsin	No. 19	Ryan Field; Evanston, IL	ABC	W 17–7	0
November 28	2:30 p.m.	at Michigan State	No. 8	Spartan Stadium; East Lansing, MI	ESPN	L 20–29	0
December 5	11:00 a.m.	Minnesota		TCF Bank Stadium; Minneapolis, MN	BTN, FS1	No contest	
December 12	11:00 a.m.	Illinois	No. 14	Ryan Field; Evanston, IL	ESPN2	W 28–10	0
December 19	11:00 a.m.	vs. No. 4 Ohio State	No. 14	Lucas Oil Stadium; Indianapolis, IN (Big Ten Championship Game)	FOX	L 10–22	3,178
January 1, 2021	12:00 p.m.	vs. Auburn*	No. 14	Camping World Stadium; Orlando, FL (Citrus Bowl)	ABC	W 35–19	13,039
*Non-conference game; Rankings from AP Poll and CFP Rankings (after November 24) released prior to game; All times are in Central time

== Rankings ==
Ranking movements Legend: ██ Increase in ranking ██ Decrease in ranking — = Not ranked RV = Received votes
	Week																	
Poll	Pre	1	2	3	4	5	6	7	8	9	10	11	12	13	14	15	16	Final
AP	RV	none	—	—	—	—	—	—	RV	RV	23	19	11	16	15	15	15	10
Coaches	—	none	—	—	—	—	—	—	RV	RV	23	20	13	17	14	14	13	10
CFP	Not released												8	14	14	14	14	Not released

== Game summaries ==
=== Maryland ===
Maryland Terrapins vs. Northwestern Wildcats – Game summary

Quarter	1	2	3	4	Total
Terrapins	3	0	0	0	3
Wildcats	14	16	7	6	43

at Ryan Field • Evanston, Illinois

- Date: October 24, 2020
- Game time: 6:30 p.m. CDT
- Game attendance: 0
- TV: BTN

Game information

First Quarter

- MD – Joseph Petrino 33-yard field goal, 9:09. Maryland 3–0. Drive: 12 plays, 56 yards, 5:51.
- NU – Isaiah Bowser 1-yard run (Charlie Kuhbander kick), 4:49. Northwestern 7–3. Drive: 14 plays, 75 yards, 4:20.
- NU – Peyton Ramsey 12-yard run (Charlie Kuhbander kick), 1:31. Northwestern 14–3. Drive: 5 plays, 55 yards, 1:58.

Second Quarter

- NU – Charlie Kuhbander 43-yard field goal, 9:04. Northwestern 17–3. Drive: 7 plays, 35 yards, 2:34.
- NU – Drake Anderson 37-yard run (Charlie Kuhbander kick), 5:43. Northwestern 24–3. Drive: 5 plays, 60 yards, 2:00.
- NU – Charlie Kuhbander 23-yard field goal, 3:23. Northwestern 27–3. Drive: 5 plays, 18 yards, 2:16.
- NU – Charlie Kuhbander 43-yard field goal, 0:00. Northwestern 30–3. Drive: 12 plays, 56 yards, 2:35.

Third Quarter

- NU – Isaiah Bowser 7-yard pass from Peyton Ramsey (Charlie Kuhbander kick), 6:29. Northwestern 37–3. Drive: 17 plays, 75 yards, 8:31.

Fourth Quarter

- NU – Evan Hull 30-yard run (kick failed), 8:25. Northwestern 43–3. Drive: 8 plays, 93 yards, 5:47.

Top Passers

- MD – Taulia Tagovailoa – 14/25, 94 yards, 3 INT
- NU – Peyton Ramsey – 23/30, 212 yards, TD

Top Rushers

- MD – Jake Funk – 6 rushes, 35 yards
- NU – Drake Anderson – 10 rushes, 103 yards, TD

Top Receivers

- MD – Nick DeGennaro – 3 receptions, 42 yards
- NU – John Raine – 5 receptions, 53 yards

=== At Iowa ===
Northwestern Wildcats vs. Iowa Hawkeyes – Game summary

Quarter	1	2	3	4	Total
Wildcats	0	14	7	0	21
Hawkeyes	17	3	0	0	20

at Kinnick Stadium • Iowa City, Iowa

- Date: October 31, 2020
- Game time: 2:30 p.m. CDT
- Game weather: 61 °F (16 °C), Clear and Sunny, Wind 15–20 mph (24–32 km/h)
- Game attendance: 1,432
- Referee: Larry Smith
- TV announcers (ESPN): Bob Wischusen, Dan Orlovsky and Allison Williams

Game information

First Quarter

- IOWA – Brandon Smith 7-yard pass from Spencer Petras (Keith Duncan kick), 11:36. Iowa 7–0. Drive: 1 play, 7 yards, 0:06.
- IOWA – Tyler Goodson 15-yard run (Keith Duncan kick), 8:36. Iowa 14–0. Drive: 3 plays, 45 yards, 1:22.
- IOWA – Keith Duncan 22-yard field goal, 1:43. Iowa 17–0. Drive: 13 plays, 61 yards, 5:04.

Second Quarter

- NU – Kyric McGowan 3-yard run (Charlie Kuhbander kick), 10:20. Iowa 17–7. Drive: 16 plays, 75 yards, 6:23.
- IOWA – Keith Duncan 47-yard field goal, 7:09. Iowa 20–7. Drive: 9 plays, 37 yards, 3:11.
- NU – Jesse Brown 1-yard run (Charlie Kuhbander kick), 1:25. Iowa 20–14. Drive: 14 plays, 79 yards, 5:44.

Third Quarter

- NU – Jesse Brown 2-yard run (Charlie Kuhbander kick), 6:05. Northwestern 21–20. Drive: 8 plays, 35 yards, 3:31.

Fourth Quarter

- No scoring plays.

Top Passers

- NU – Peyton Ramsey – 11/18, 130 yards, INT
- IOWA – Spencer Petras – 26/50, 216 yards, TD, 3 INT

Top Rushers

- NU – Isaiah Bowser – 25 rushes, 85 yards
- IOWA – Tyler Goodson – 13 rushes, 43 yards, TD

Top Receivers

- NU – Kyric McGowan – 5 receptions, 63 yards
- IOWA – Ihmir Smith-Marsette – 7 receptions, 84 yards

=== Nebraska ===
Nebraska Cornhuskers vs. Northwestern Wildcats – Game summary

Quarter	1	2	3	4	Total
Cornhuskers	0	13	0	0	13
Wildcats	7	0	7	7	21

at Ryan Field • Evanston, Illinois

- Date: November 7, 2020
- Game time: 11:00 a.m. CST
- Game weather: Sunny, 66 °F (19 °C)
- Game attendance: 0
- Referee: Jerry McGinn
- TV announcers (BTN): Cory Provus (play-by-play), Jeremy Leman (analyst), Olivia Harlan (sideline)

Game information

First Quarter

- NU – Drake Anderson 41-yard run (Charlie Kuhbander kick), 8:29. Northwestern 7–0. Drive: 7 plays, 80 yards, 2:43.

Second Quarter

- NEB – Connor Culp 38-yard field goal, 11:29. Northwestern 7–3. Drive: 14 plays, 56 yards, 5:33.
- NEB – Connor Culp 36-yard field goal, 8:54. Northwestern 7–6. Drive: 6 plays, 34 yards, 1:57.
- NEB – Dedrick Mills 3-yard run (Connor Culp kick), 1:25. Nebraska 13–7. Drive: 1 play, 3 yards, 0:07.

Third Quarter

- NU – John Raine 2-yard pass from Peyton Ramsey (Charlie Kuhbander kick), 9:54. Northwestern 14–13. Drive: 10 plays, 61 yards, 4:57.

Fourth Quarter

- NU – Riley Lees 10-yard pass from Peyton Ramsey (Charlie Kuhbander kick), 9:53. Northwestern 21–13. Drive: 6 plays, 44 yards, 3:13.

Top Passers

- NEB – Adrian Martinez – 12/27, 125 yards, INT
- NU – Peyton Ramsey – 16/27, 169 yards, 2 TD, 2 INT

Top Rushers

- NEB – Adrian Martinez – 13 rushes, 102 yards
- NU – Drake Anderson – 18 rushes, 89 yards, 1 TD

Top Receivers

- NEB – Marcus Fleming – 5 receptions, 75 yards
- NU – John Raine – 4 receptions, 33 yards, TD

=== At Purdue ===
Northwestern Wildcats vs. Purdue Boilermakers – Game summary

Quarter	1	2	3	4	Total
No. 23 Wildcats	7	10	7	3	27
Boilermakers	3	7	3	7	20

at Ross-Ade Stadium • West Lafayette, Indiana

- Date: November 14, 2020
- Game time: 6:30 p.m. CST
- Game weather: 46 °F (8 °C), Overcast, SE 10 mph (16 km/h)
- Game attendance: 886
- Referee: Jeff Servinski
- TV announcers (BTN): Cory Provus (play-by-play), Anthony Herron (analyst), Olivia Dekker (sideline)

Game information

First Quarter

- NU – Ramaud Chiaokhiao-Bowman 8-yard pass from Peyton Ramsey (Charlie Kuhbander kick), 9:00. Northwestern 7–0. Drive: 14 plays, 75 yards, 6:00.
- PUR – J.D. Dellinger 30-yard field goal, 1:20. Northwestern 7–3. Drive: 5 plays, 25 yards, 2:03.

Second Quarter

- NU – Charlie Kuhbander 46-yard field goal, 12:07. Northwestern 10–3. Drive: 9 plays, 47 yards, 4:13.
- PUR – Garrett Miller 40-yard pass from Aidan O'Connell (J.D. Dellinger kick), 7:27. Tied 10–10. Drive: 5 plays, 60 yards, 2:19.
- NU – Ramaud Chiaokhiao-Bowman 18-yard pass from Peyton Ramsey (Charlie Kuhbander kick), 3:06. Northwestern 17–10. Drive: 9 plays, 62 yards, 4:21.

Third Quarter

- NU – Ramaud Chiaokhiao-Bowman 5-yard pass from Peyton Ramsey (Charlie Kuhbander kick), 7:39. Northwestern 24–10. Drive: 5 plays, 18 yards, 2:29.
- PUR – J.D. Dellinger 23-yard field goal, 3:45. Northwestern 24–13. Drive: 10 plays, 64 yards, 3:54.

Fourth Quarter

- NU – Charlie Kuhbander 42-yard field goal, 12:34. Northwestern 27–13. Drive: 14 plays, 51 yards, 6:11.
- PUR – Milton Wright 14-yard pass from Aidan O'Connell (J.D. Dellinger kick), 7:35. Northwestern 27–20. Drive: 14 plays, 75 yards, 4:59.

Top Passers

- NU – Peyton Ramsey – 23/36, 212 yards, 3 TD, INT
- PUR – Aidan O'Connell – 28/51, 263 yards, 2 TD

Top Rushers

- NU – Isaiah Bowser – 13 rushes, 27 yards
- PUR – Zander Horvath – 10 rushes, 21 yards

Top Receivers

- NU – Ramaud Chiaokhiao-Bowman – 8 receptions, 86 yards, 3 TD
- PUR – Zander Horvath – 9 receptions, 100 yards

=== Wisconsin ===
Wisconsin Badgers vs. Northwestern Wildcats – Game summary

Quarter	1	2	3	4	Total
No. 10 Badgers	7	0	0	0	7
No. 19 Wildcats	7	7	0	3	17

at Ryan Field • Evanston, Illinois

- Date: November 21, 2020
- Game time: 2:30 p.m. CST
- Game attendance: No in-person attendance
- TV: ABC

Game information

First Quarter

- NU – Charlie Mangieri 2-yard pass from Peyton Ramsey (Charlie Kuhbander kick), 10:50. Northwestern 7–0. Drive: 6 plays, 46 yards, 2:41.
- WISC – Chimere Dike 49-yard pass from Graham Mertz (Collin Larsh kick), 5:14. Tied 7–7. Drive: 6 plays, 80 yards, 3:09.

Second Quarter

- NU – Ramaud Chiaokhiao-Bowman 25-yard pass from Peyton Ramsey (Charlie Kuhbander kick), 0:56. Northwestern 14–7. Drive: 7 plays, 72 yards, 1:19.

Third Quarter

- No scoring plays.

Fourth Quarter

- NU – Charlie Kuhbander 32-yard field goal, 11:35. Northwestern 17–7. Drive: 9 plays, 53 yards, 1:53.

Top Passers

- WISC – Graham Mertz – 23/41, 230 yards, TD, 3 INT
- NU – Peyton Ramsey – 23/44, 203 yards, 2 TD

Top Rushers

- WISC – Jalen Berger – 15 rushes, 93 yards
- NU – Drake Anderson – 8 rushes, 13 yards

Top Receivers

- WISC – Jake Ferguson – 7 receptions, 58 yards
- NU – Ramaud Chiaokhiao-Bowman – 4 receptions, 95 yards, TD

I've been watching Northwestern play and honestly, they got a bunch of Rece Davises out there running around.

— Joey Galloway, ESPN analyst

=== At Michigan State ===
Northwestern Wildcats vs. Michigan State Spartans – Game summary

Quarter	1	2	3	4	Total
No. 8 Wildcats	0	6	7	7	20
Spartans	10	7	0	12	29

at Spartan Stadium • East Lansing, Michigan

- Date: November 28, 2020
- Game time: 2:30 p.m. CST
- Game weather: Sunny, light clouds • Temperature: 45 °F (7 °C) • Wind: SW 7 miles per hour (11 km/h)
- Game attendance: 0
- Referee: M. Kluczynski
- TV announcers (ESPN): Clay Matvick, Rocky Boiman

Game information

First Quarter

- MSU – Jalen Nailor 75-yard pass from Rocky Lombardi (Matt Coghlin kick), 10:34. Michigan State 7–0. Drive: 2 plays, 81 yards, 0:41.
- MSU – Matt Coghlin 22-yard field goal, 7:06. Michigan State 10–0. Drive: 4 plays, 6 yards, 1:18.

Second Quarter

- MSU – Jayden Reed 15-yard pass from Rocky Lombardi (Matt Coghlin kick), 14:55. Michigan State 17–0. Drive: 13 plays, 85 yards, 5:44.
- NU – Charlie Kuhbander 42-yard field goal, 11:02. Michigan State 17–3. Drive: 13 plays, 51 yards, 3:53.
- NU – Charlie Kuhbander 32-yard field goal, 6:35. Michigan State 17–6. Drive: 9 plays, 42 yards, 1:45.

Third Quarter

- NU – Peyton Ramsey 1-yard run (Charlie Kuhbander kick), 10:39. Michigan State 17–13. Drive: 10 plays, 75 yards, 4:21.

Fourth Quarter

- NU – Cam Porter 3-yard run (Charlie Kuhbander kick), 13:54. Northwestern 20–17. Drive: 8 plays, 37 yards, 3:34.
- MSU – Matt Coghlin 44-yard field goal, 10:11. Tied 20–20. Drive: 7 plays, 27 yards, 3:04.
- MSU – Matt Coghlin 48-yard field goal, 3:35. Michigan State 23–20. Drive: 7 plays, 19 yards, 2:47.
- MSU – Kalon Gervin 0-yard fumble recovery, 0:00. Michigan State 29–20.

Top Passers

- NU – Peyton Ramsey – 21/43, 210 yards, 2 INT
- MSU – Rocky Lombardi – 11/27, 167 yards, 2 TD, INT

Top Rushers

- NU – Drake Anderson – 10 rushes, 41 yards
- MSU – Connor Heyward – 24 rushes, 96 yards

Top Receivers

- NU – Riley Lees – 4 receptions, 59 yards
- MSU – Jalen Nailor – 3 receptions, 99 yards, TD

=== At Minnesota (Cancelled) ===
Northwestern Wildcats vs. Minnesota Golden Gophers – Game summary

Quarter	1	2	3	4	Total
~~No. 14 Wildcats~~	0	0	0	0	0
~~Golden Gophers~~	0	0	0	0	0

at ~~TCF Bank Stadium • Minneapolis, Minnesota~~

- Date: ~~December 5, 2020~~
- Game time: ~~11:00 a.m. CST~~
- TV: ~~BTN/FS1~~

=== Illinois ===
Illinois Fighting Illini vs. Northwestern Wildcats – Game summary

Quarter	1	2	3	4	Total
Fighting Illini	3	0	0	7	10
No. 14 Wildcats	0	14	14	0	28

at Ryan Field • Evanston, Illinois

- Date: December 12, 2020
- Game time: 11:00 a.m. CST
- Game attendance: 0
- TV: ESPN2

Game information

First quarter

- ILL – James McCourt 39-yard field goal, 1:49. Illinois 3–0. Drive: 14 plays, 59 yards, 7:29.

Second quarter

- NU – Charlie Mangieri 2-yard pass from Peyton Ramsey (Charlie Kuhbander kick), 14:56. Northwestern 7–3. Drive: 6 plays, 75 yards, 1:53.
- NU – Cam Porter 2-yard run (Charlie Kuhbander kick), 0:24. Northwestern 14–3. Drive: 17 plays, 64 yards, 7:02.

Third quarter

- NU – Cam Porter 18-yard run (Charlie Kuhbander kick), 10:53. Northwestern 21–3. Drive: 9 plays, 75 yards, 4:07.
- NU – Evan Hull 32-yard run (Charlie Kuhbander kick), 4:02. Northwestern 28–3. Drive: 10 plays, 81 yards, 6:04.

Fourth quarter

- ILL – Brian Hightower 46-yard pass from Isaiah Williams (James McCourt kick), 8:47. Northwestern 28–10. Drive: 7 plays, 86 yards, 1:38.

Top Passers

- ILL – Isaiah Williams – 4/8, 86 yards, TD
- NU – Peyton Ramsey – 7/12, 82 yards, TD

Top Rushers

- ILL – Chase Brown – 14 rushes, 70 yards
- NU – Evan Hull – 13 rushes, 149 yards, TD

Top Receivers

- ILL – Brian Hightower – 2 receptions, 60 yards, TD
- NU – Kyric McGowan – 4 receptions, 72 yards

=== Vs. Ohio State ===
Northwestern Wildcats vs. Ohio State Buckeyes (Big Ten Championship game) – Game summary

Quarter	1	2	3	4	Total
No. 14 Wildcats	7	3	0	0	10
No. 4 Buckeyes	3	3	7	9	22

at Lucas Oil Stadium • Indianapolis, IN

- Date: December 19, 2020
- Game time: 11:18 a.m. CST
- Game weather: Overcast (game played indoors)
- Game attendance: 3,178
- Referee: Mark Kluczynski
- TV announcers (FOX): Gus Johnson (play-by-play), Joel Klatt (analyst), and Jenny Taft (sideline)

Game information

First Quarter

- OSU – Blake Haubeil 41-yard field goal, 6:34. Ohio State 3–0. Drive: 16 plays, 51 yards, 8:26.
- NU – Cam Porter 9-yard run (Charlie Kuhbander kick), 4:02. Northwestern 7–3. Drive: 7 plays, 75 yards, 2:32.

Second Quarter

- NU – Charlie Kuhbander 47-yard field goal, 8:46. Northwestern 10–3. Drive: 14 plays, 65 yards, 6:00.
- OSU – Blake Haubeil 43-yard field goal, 5:23. Northwestern 10–6. Drive: 8 plays, 49 yards, 3:23.

Third Quarter

- OSU – Trey Sermon 9-yard run (Blake Haubeil kick), 2:41. Ohio State 13–10. Drive: 7 plays, 71 yards, 2:23.

Fourth Quarter

- OSU – Blake Haubeil 26-yard field goal, 12:07. Ohio State 16–10. Drive: 5 plays, 31 yards, 2:19.
- OSU – Trey Sermon 3-yard run (pass failed), 4:03. Ohio State 22–10. Drive: 9 plays, 80 yards, 4:46.

Top Passers

- NU – Peyton Ramsey – 24/37, 224 yards, 2 INT
- OSU – Justin Fields – 12/27, 114 yards, 2 INT

Top Rushers

- NU – Cam Porter – 16 rushes, 61 yards, TD
- OSU – Trey Sermon – 29 rushes, 331 yards, 2 TD

Top Receivers

- NU – Ramaud Chiaokhiao-Bowman – 8 receptions, 103 yards
- OSU – Julian Fleming – 4 receptions, 53 yards

=== Vs. Auburn ===
Northwestern Wildcats vs. Auburn Tigers (Citrus Bowl) – Game summary

Quarter	1	2	3	4	Total
Auburn	0	6	7	6	19
No. 14 Wildcats	14	0	7	14	35

at Camping World Stadium • Orlando, FL

- Date: January 1st, 2021
- Game time: 12:00 p.m. CST
- Game weather: Mostly Sunny
- Game attendance: 13,039
- Referee: Jerry Magallanes
- TV announcers (ABC): Dave Flemming (play-by-play), Rod Gilmore (analyst), Paul Carcaterra (sideline reporter)

Game information

First Quarter

- NU – Ramaud Chiaokhiao-Bowman 35-yard pass from Peyton Ramsey (Charlie Kuhbander kick), 11:32. Northwestern 7–0. Drive: 9 plays, 75 yards, 3:28.
- NU – John Raine 6-yard pass from Peyton Ramsey (Charlie Kuhbander kick), 3:14. Northwestern 14–0. Drive: 10 plays, 68 yards, 4:21.

Second Quarter

- AUB – Anders Carlson 50-yard field goal, 6:03. Northwestern 14–3. Drive: 8 plays, 20 yards, 2:36.
- AUB – Anders Carlson 27-yard field goal, 0:17. Northwestern 14–6. Drive: 15 plays, 72 yards, 3:45.

Third Quarter

- AUB – Elijah Canion 57-yard pass from Bo Nix (Anders Carlson kick), 8:32. Northwestern 14–13. Drive: 6 plays, 75 yards, 2:10.
- NU – Peyton Ramsey 30-yard run (Charlie Kuhbander kick), 1:34. Northwestern 21–13. Drive: 9 plays, 87 yards, 2:10.

Fourth Quarter

- NU – Cam Porter 1-yard run (Charlie Kuhbander kick), 12:13. Northwestern 28–13. Drive: 7 plays, 50 yards, 2:16.
- NU – Riley Lees 8-yard pass from Peyton Ramsey (Charlie Kuhbander kick), 7:49. Northwestern 35–13. Drive: 6 plays, 24 yards, 3:35.
- AUB – D.J. Williams 2-yard run (pass failed), 4:41. Northwestern 35–19. Drive: 10 plays, 75 yards, 3:08.

Top Passers

- AUB – Bo Nix – 25/42, 292 yards, TD
- NU – Peyton Ramsey – 24/35, 291 yards, 3 TD

Top Rushers

- AUB – Bo Nix − 10 rushes, 32 yards
- NU – Cam Porter – 33 rushes, 98 yards, TD

Top Receivers

- AUB – Elijah Canion – 3 receptions, 80 yards, TD
- NU – John Raine – 6 receptions, 76 yards, TD

== Players drafted into the NFL ==
Round	Pick	Player	Position	NFL Club
1	13	Rashawn Slater	OT	Los Angeles Chargers
1	26	Greg Newsome II	CB	Cleveland Browns
5	174	Earnest Brown IV	DE	Los Angeles Rams

=== Undrafted players ===
Player	Position	NFL Club
Blake Gallagher	LB	Baltimore Ravens
Riley Lees	WR	Cincinnati Bengals
Gunnar Vogel	OT	Chicago Bears
J.R. Pace	CB	Atlanta Falcons
John Raine	TE	Atlanta Falcons
Paddy Fisher	LB	Carolina Panthers
