= Rick George =

Athletic director of Colorado Buffaloes

Rick George is a former athletic director for the University of Colorado Boulder in Boulder, Colorado. Before joining CU, George worked for the Texas Rangers. He joined the club in October 2010. In March 2013, George was promoted from COO to president of business operations.

In November, 2025, George announced his intention to retire from the position of athletic director and take on an advisory role. On December 29, 2025, George's retirement was finalized upon the hiring of Fernando Lovo as the program's new athletic director.
