= Trey Sermon =

American football player (born 1999)

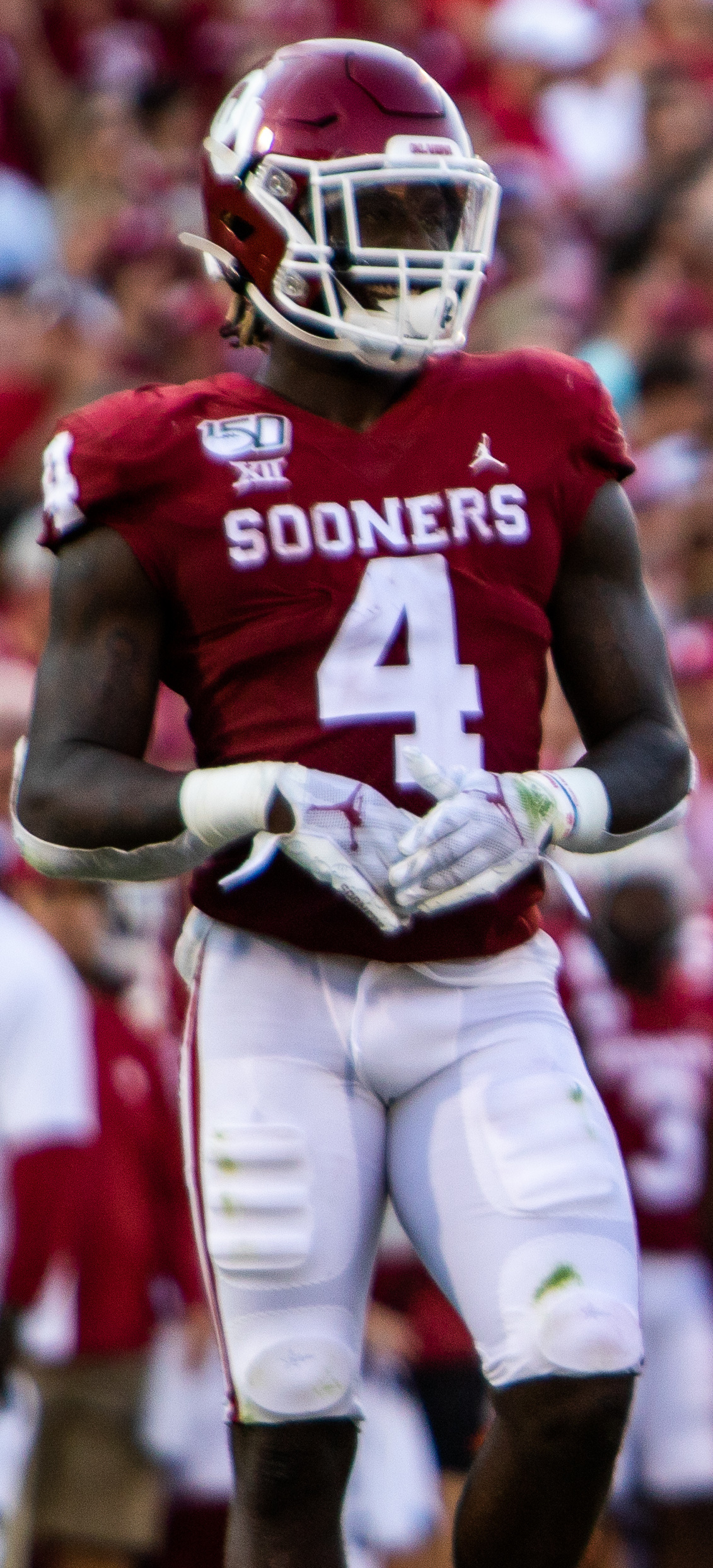
- Sermon with the Oklahoma Sooners in 2019

No. 44 – Atlanta Falcons
- Position: Running back
- Roster status: Injured reserve

Personal information
- Born: January 30, 1999 (age 27); St. Petersburg, Florida, U.S.
- Listed height: 6 ft 0 in (1.83 m)
- Listed weight: 215 lb (98 kg)

Career information
- High school: Sprayberry (Marietta, Georgia)
- College: Oklahoma (2017–2019); Ohio State (2020)
- NFL draft: 2021: 3rd round, 88th overall pick

Career history
- San Francisco 49ers (2021); Philadelphia Eagles (2022–2023); Indianapolis Colts (2023–2024); Pittsburgh Steelers (2025); Atlanta Falcons (2026–present)

Awards and highlights
- Second-team All-Big Ten (2020)

Career NFL statistics as of 2025
- Rushing yards: 505
- Rushing average: 3.8
- Rushing touchdowns: 3
- Receptions: 22
- Receiving yards: 138
- Stats at Pro Football Reference

An'treyon Sermon (born January 30, 1999) is an American professional football running back for the Atlanta Falcons of the National Football League (NFL). He played college football for the Oklahoma Sooners and Ohio State Buckeyes and was selected by the San Francisco 49ers in the third round of the 2021 NFL draft. He also played for the Philadelphia Eagles and Indianapolis Colts.

== Early life ==
Sermon attended Sprayberry High School in Marietta, Georgia. He committed to the University of Oklahoma to play college football.

== College career ==
=== Oklahoma ===
As a true freshman at Oklahoma in 2017, Sermon played in all 14 games and made three starts. He finished the season with 744 yards on 121 carries with five touchdowns. As a sophomore in 2018, he shared time with Kennedy Brooks, rushing for 947 yards on 164 carries and 13 touchdowns. As a junior in 2019, he played in nine games and had 54 carries for 385 yards and four touchdowns.

=== Ohio State ===
Sermon transferred to Ohio State University as a graduate student in 2020. In the 2020 Big Ten Championship Game against Northwestern University, Sermon's 331 rushing yards were the most in a single game by an Ohio State player and the highest ever in a Football Bowl Subdivision championship game. In the 2021 Sugar Bowl versus Clemson, Sermon rushed for 193 yards and scored a rushing touchdown along with catching 4 passes for 61 yards in a 49–28 victory. In the 2021 National Championship Game against Alabama, Sermon got injured on the first play of the game and did not return in the 52–24 loss.

=== Statistics ===
Season	GP	Rushing					Receiving				
Season	GP	Att	Yds	Avg	Lng	TD	Rec	Yds	Avg	Lng	TD
2017	13	121	744	6.1	60	5	16	139	8.7	24	2
2018	14	164	947	5.8	60	13	12	181	15.1	51	0
2019	10	54	385	7.1	32	4	8	71	8.9	20	1
2020	8	116	870	7.5	65	4	12	95	7.9	13	0
Career	45	455	2,946	6.5	65	26	48	486	9.7	51	3

== Professional career ==
Pre-draft measurables
Height	Weight	Arm length	Hand span	Wingspan	40-yard dash	10-yard split	20-yard split	20-yard shuttle	Three-cone drill	Vertical jump	Broad jump
6 ft 0 3/8 in (1.84 m)	215 lb (98 kg)	33 3/8 in (0.85 m)	9 3/8 in (0.24 m)	6 ft 5 1/8 in (1.96 m)	4.61 s	1.49 s	2.62 s	4.30 s	6.84 s	37.0 in (0.94 m)	10 ft 5 in (3.18 m)
All values from Pro Day

=== San Francisco 49ers ===
Sermon was selected by the San Francisco 49ers in the third round (88th overall) of the 2021 NFL draft. He signed his four-year rookie contract on July 21, 2021.

Sermon entered his rookie season in 2021 as the third-string running back behind Raheem Mostert and fellow rookie Elijah Mitchell. He made his first career start in Week 3, where he rushed for 31 yards and a touchdown with two catches for three yards and another touchdown against the Green Bay Packers. He suffered an ankle injury in Week 12 and was placed on injured reserve on December 4, 2021. He was activated on January 11, 2022. As a rookie, he appeared in nine games and started two. He totaled 41 carries for 167 rushing yards and one rushing touchdown.

Sermon was released by the 49ers on August 31, 2022.

=== Philadelphia Eagles ===
On September 1, 2022, Sermon was claimed off waivers by the Philadelphia Eagles. He appeared in two games, Weeks 4 and 5, in the 2022 season.

Sermon was waived/injured by the Eagles on August 29, 2023. He reverted back to injured reserve two days later. On September 15, the Eagles waived Sermon from injured reserve.

=== Indianapolis Colts ===
On September 19, 2023, Sermon was signed to the practice squad of the Indianapolis Colts. He was promoted to the active roster on September 23. He appeared in 14 games for the Colts in the regular season. He recorded 35 carries for 160 rushing yards.

On March 14, 2024, the Colts re-signed Sermon to a new contract.

=== Pittsburgh Steelers ===
On May 11, 2025, Sermon signed with the Pittsburgh Steelers to a one-year contract. He was released on August 26 as part of final roster cuts and was signed to the practice squad the following day. Sermon was promoted to the active roster on November 8, but waived four days later. He was re-signed to the practice squad on November 13 and released on December 10. Sermon played in four games for the Steelers, all on special teams, returning 2 kicks for 51 yards and combining on one tackle. He was re-signed to the practice squad on December 17.

=== Atlanta Falcons ===
On August 10, 2026, Sermon signed with the Atlanta Falcons. He was placed on injured reserve on August 19 due to a hand/arm injury.
