= 2020 Big Ten Football Championship Game =

- Conference Championship
Northwestern Wildcats	Ohio State Buckeyes
(6–1)	(5–0)
10	22
Head coach: Pat Fitzgerald	Head coach: Ryan Day
AP / Coaches / CFP; 15 / 14 / 14	AP / Coaches / CFP; 3 / 4 / 4
	1	2	3	4	Total
Northwestern	7	3	0	0	10
Ohio State	3	3	7	9	22
- Date: December 19, 2020
- Season: 2020
- Stadium: Lucas Oil Stadium
- Location: Indianapolis, Indiana
- MVP: Trey Sermon, RB, Ohio State
- Favorite: Ohio State by 16.5
- National anthem: Kindergarten class
- Referee: Mark Kluczynski
- Halftime show: none
- Attendance: 3,178

United States TV coverage
- Network: Fox
- Announcers: Gus Johnson (play-by-play), Joel Klatt (analyst) and Jenny Taft (sideline)
- Nielsen ratings: 8.03 million

2020 Big Ten Conference football standings
	Conf.			Overall
Team	W		L	W		L
East Division
No. 2 Ohio State xy$^	5	–	0	7	–	1
No. 12 Indiana	6	–	1	6	–	2
Penn State	4	–	5	4	–	5
Maryland	2	–	3	2	–	3
Rutgers	3	–	6	3	–	6
Michigan	2	–	4	2	–	4
Michigan State	2	–	5	2	–	5
West Division
No. 10 Northwestern xy	6	–	1	7	–	2
No. 16 Iowa	6	–	2	6	–	2
Wisconsin	3	–	3	4	–	3
Minnesota	3	–	4	3	–	4
Nebraska	3	–	5	3	–	5
Purdue	2	–	4	2	–	4
Illinois	2	–	6	2	–	6
Championship: Ohio State 22, Northwestern 10
^ – College Football Playoff participant; $ – Conference champion; x – Division champion/co-champions; y – Championship game participant; Note: Due to COVID-19, the Big Ten suspended the season on August 11, but later decided to begin play on October 24. In addition to the title game that was played on December 19, the conference seeded all remaining teams for "championship week" games.; Rankings from AP Poll.

The 2020 Big Ten Football Championship Game was a college football game played on December 19, 2020, at Lucas Oil Stadium in Indianapolis, Indiana. The tenth annual Big Ten Football Championship Game, it determined the 2020 champion of the Big Ten Conference. The game was played between the No. 4 Ohio State Buckeyes out of the East division, and the No. 14 Northwestern Wildcats out of the West division. Sponsored by credit card company Discover, the game was officially known as the Big Ten Championship Game presented by Discover.

== History ==
The 2020 Championship Game was the tenth in the Big Ten's 125-year history and the seventh to feature the conference's East and West alignment. East division champion Ohio State won the 2019 game over West division champion Wisconsin by a score of 34–21.

== Teams ==
Ohio State and Northwestern faced each other in the Big Ten Championship Game for the second time. Ohio State won the first championship game between the two schools, in 2018.

=== Northwestern ===
Northwestern booked their place in the Championship Game by winning the West Division with a record of 6–1 (6–1 Big Ten). The Wildcats were making their second appearance in the Championship Game, with the only previous appearance coming in 2018 against Ohio State. The Wildcats were ranked 14th in the College Football Playoff rankings heading into the game.

=== Ohio State ===
Ohio State secured their place in the Championship Game by winning the East Division with an undefeated 5–0 (5–0 Big Ten) regular season record. This was Ohio State's sixth appearance in the Championship Game, and fourth consecutive. They were the three-time reigning conference champions. The Buckeyes were ranked fourth in the College Football Playoff rankings heading into the game.

Originally, Ohio State would not have qualified to play in the championship game due to the Big Ten's six-game minimum rule that was adopted in light of the COVID-19 pandemic, but that rule was eliminated shortly after Ohio State's final game, against Michigan, was canceled. This allowed the Buckeyes to advance to the Championship game at 5–0 over Big Ten East runners-up Indiana, who finished 6–1.

== Game summary ==
2020 Big Ten Football Championship Game

Quarter	1	2	3	4	Total
No. 14 Northwestern	7	3	0	0	10
No. 4 Ohio State	3	3	7	9	22

at Lucas Oil Stadium • Indianapolis, Indiana

- Date: Saturday, December 19, 2020
- Game time: 12:18 p.m. EST
- Game weather: n/a (game played indoors)
- Game attendance: 3,178
- Referee: Mark Kluczynski
- TV announcers (Fox): Gus Johnson (play-by-play), Joel Klatt (analyst) and Jenny Taft (sideline)

Game information

First quarter

- (6:34) OSU – Blake Haubeil 41 yard field goal (Drive: 16 plays, 51 yards, 8:26; Ohio State 3–0)
- (4:02) NU – Cam Porter 9 yard rush, Charlie Kuhbander kick (Drive: 7 plays, 75 yards, 2:32; Northwestern 7–3)

Second quarter

- (8:46) NU – Charlie Kuhbander 47 yard field goal (Drive: 14 plays, 65 yards, 6:00; Northwestern 10–3)
- (5:23) OSU – Blake Haubeil 43 yard field goal (Drive: 8 plays, 49 yards, 3:23; Northwestern 10–6)

Third quarter

- (2:41) OSU – Trey Sermon 9 yard rush, Blake Haubeil kick (Drive: 7 plays, 71 yards, 2:23; Ohio State 13–10)

Fourth quarter

- (12:07) OSU – Blake Haubeil 26 yard field goal (Drive: 5 plays, 31 yards, 2:19; Ohio State 16–10)
- (4:03) OSU – Trey Sermon 3 yard rush, 2-point pass failed (Drive: 9 plays, 80 yards, 4:46; Ohio State 22–10)

=== Statistics ===
Statistics	NU	OSU
First downs	19	24
Plays–yards	71–329	71–513
Rushes–yards	34–105	44–399
Passing yards	224	114
Passing: comp–att–int	24–37–2	12–27–2
Turnovers		
Time of possession	28:40	31:20

Team	Category	Player	Statistics
Northwestern	Passing	Peyton Ramsey	24/37, 224 yards, 2 INT
Northwestern	Rushing	Cam Porter	16 carries, 61 yards, 1 TD
Northwestern	Receiving	Ramaud Chiaokhiao-Bowman	8 receptions, 103 yards
Ohio State	Passing	Justin Fields	12/27, 114 yards, 2 INT
Ohio State	Rushing	Trey Sermon	29 carries, 331 yards, 2 TD (Note: Trey Sermon's 331 rushing yards set a new Ohio State single-game school record.)
Ohio State	Receiving	Julian Fleming	4 receptions, 53 yards

== See also ==
- List of Big Ten Conference football champions
