= Sevyn Banks =

American football player (born 1999)

Profile
- Position: Cornerback

Personal information
- Born: September 30, 1999 (age 27); Orlando, Florida, U.S.
- Listed height: 6 ft 1 in (1.85 m)
- Listed weight: 200 lb (91 kg)

Career information
- High school: Jones (Orlando, Florida)
- College: Ohio State (2018–2021); LSU (2022)
- Stats at ESPN

Sevyn Banks (born September 30, 1999) is an American former college football cornerback who played at Ohio State and at LSU.

== Early life ==
Banks attended The First Academy in Orlando, Florida his freshman and sophomore years before transferring to Jones in Orlando for his final two years. He played in the 2018 Under Armour All-America Game. Banks committed to Ohio State University to play college football.

== College career ==
=== Ohio State ===
Banks played his first two years at Ohio State in 2018 and 2019 as a backup, recording 12 tackles and one interception. As a junior in 2020, he became a starter. He finished the season with 23 tackles and fumble recovered for a touchdown.

=== LSU ===
On April 19, 2022, Banks transferred to LSU. After having his career cut short due to an injury, On February 27, 2023, Banks left the program and quietly declared for the 2023 NFL draft.

== Personal life ==
His brother, Marcell Harris, plays in the NFL.
