= Julian Fleming =

American football player (born 2000)

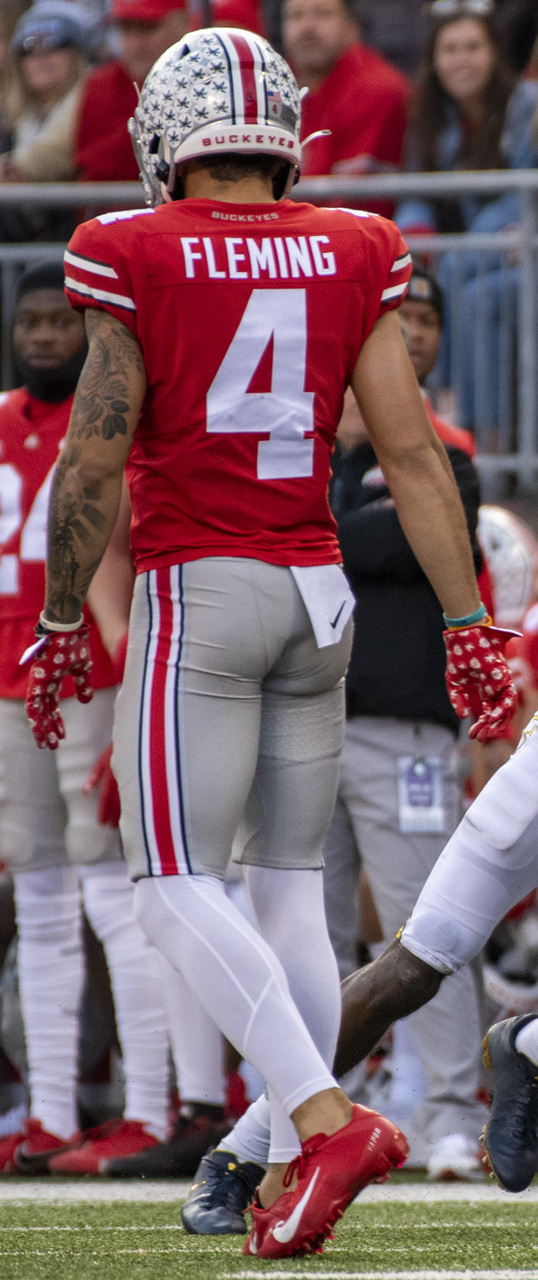
- Fleming with the Ohio State Buckeyes in 2022

Profile
- Position: Wide receiver

Personal information
- Born: December 19, 2000 (age 25); Bloomsburg, Pennsylvania, U.S.
- Listed height: 6 ft 2 in (1.88 m)
- Listed weight: 215 lb (98 kg)

Career information
- High school: Southern Columbia Area (Catawissa, Pennsylvania)
- College: Ohio State (2020–2023); Penn State (2024)
- NFL draft: 2025: undrafted

Julian Fleming (born December 19, 2000) is an American football wide receiver. He played college football for the Ohio State Buckeyes and Penn State Nittany Lions.

== Early life ==
Fleming played high school football at Southern Columbia Area High School. He finished his high school football career with 4,442 receiving yards and 62 receiving touchdowns, both PIAA records. He was a five star recruit coming out of high school and committed to Ohio State University to play college football. Rivals.com named Fleming as the best wide receiver and the 14th-best player in the 2020 recruiting class.

College recruiting
Name	Hometown	School	Height	Weight	Commit date
Julian Fleming; WR	Catawissa, PA	Southern Columbia Area	6 ft 2 in (1.88 m)	200 lb (91 kg)	May 31, 2019
Julian Fleming; WR	Recruit ratings: Scout: Rivals: 247Sports: ESPN:				
Overall recruit ranking: Rivals: 14 247Sports: 3 ESPN: 1
Note: In many cases, Scout, Rivals, 247Sports, On3, and ESPN may conflict in their listings of height and weight.; In these cases, the average was taken. ESPN grades are on a 100-point scale.; Sources: "2020 Team Ranking". Rivals.com.

== College career ==
Fleming struggled with injuries throughout his freshman and sophomore years. He had his best season as a junior in 2022, catching 34 passes for 533 receiving yards and six touchdowns. On December 4, 2023, Fleming announced that he would enter the transfer portal. On January 4, 2024, he announced that he was transferring to Penn State.

=== College statistics ===
Season	Games		Receiving				
Season	GP	GS	Rec	Yds	Avg	YPG	TD
2020	6	1	7	74	10.6	12.3	0
2021	9	1	12	86	7.2	9.6	1
2022	11	9	34	533	15.7	48.5	6
2023	12	11	26	270	10.4	22.5	0
2024	16	4	14	176	12.6	11.0	1
Career	54	26	93	1,139	12.2	21.1	8

== Professional career ==
Pre-draft measurables
Height	Weight	40-yard dash	20-yard shuttle	Three-cone drill	Vertical jump	Broad jump
6 ft 1 3/4 in (1.87 m)	208 lb (94 kg)	4.68 s	4.27 s	7.14 s	34.5 in (0.88 m)	10 ft 3 in (3.12 m)
All values from Pro Day

Fleming was expected to sign a contract with the Green Bay Packers as an undrafted free agent, but the offer was withdrawn after a failed physical.

== Personal life ==
On May 23, 2025, Fleming was driving an ATV with his girlfriend, Alyssa Boyd, as a passenger in Bradford County, Pennsylvania when a deer suddenly jumped in front of the vehicle. The resulting collision left Fleming severely injured and killed Boyd; Fleming was later charged with homicide by motor vehicle and DUI. On July 20, 2026, Fleming was sentenced to nine to 23 months in prison, followed by six months of probation.
