= Tuf Borland =

American football player and coach (born 1998)

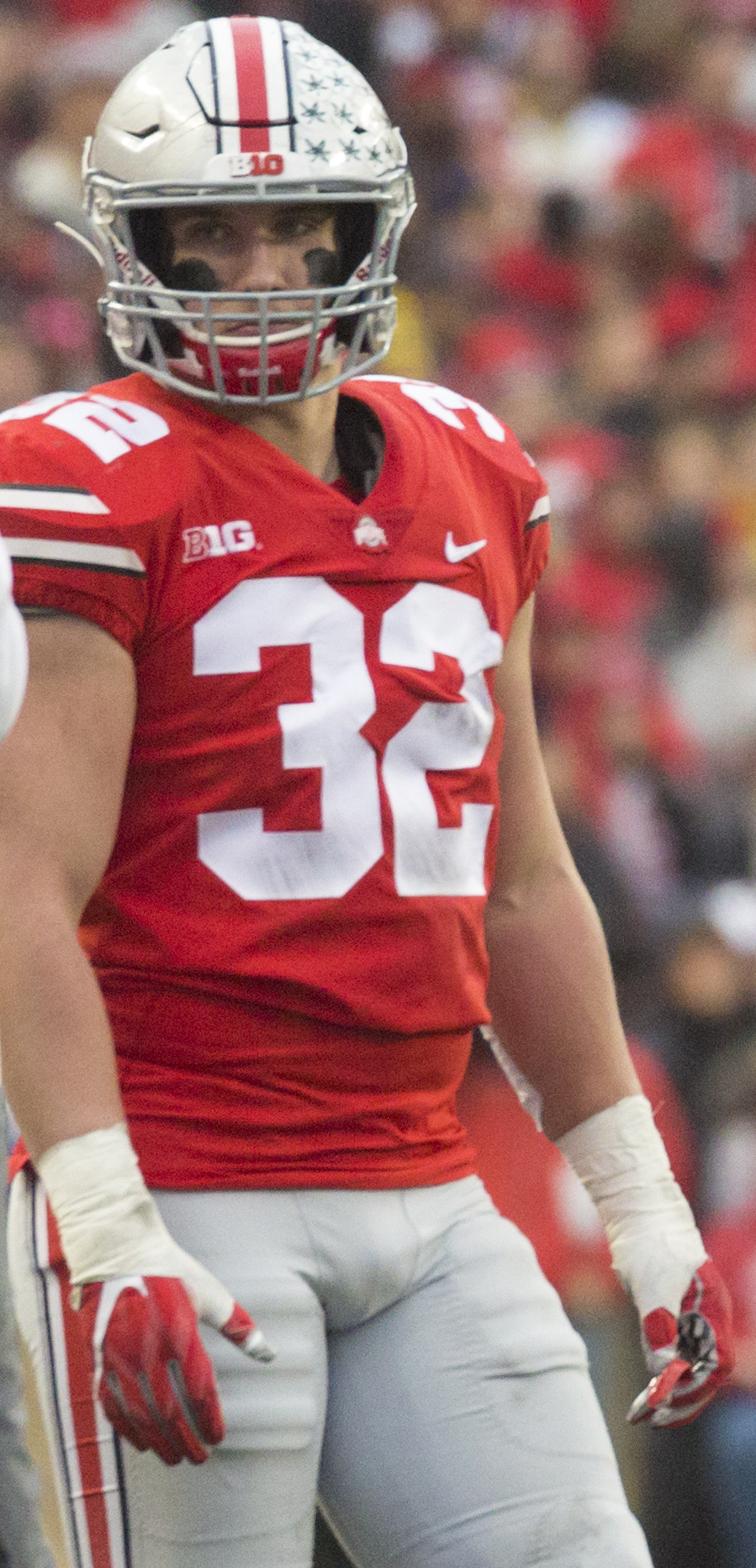
- Borland with Ohio State in 2018

Current position
- Title: Inside Linebackers coach
- Team: Wisconsin
- Conference: Big Ten

Biographical details
- Born: March 23, 1998 (age 28); Bolingbrook, Illinois, U.S.
- Education: Ohio State University

Playing career
- 2016–2020: Ohio State
- 2021: Minnesota Vikings
- Position: Linebacker

Coaching career (HC unless noted)
- 2023–2025: Wisconsin (GA)
- 2026–present: Wisconsin (ILB)

Tuf Jarred Borland (born March 23, 1998) is an American college football coach and former professional linebacker. He is the inside linebackers coach for the University of Wisconsin–Madison, a position he has held since 2026. He played college football at the Ohio State University. After going undrafted in the 2021 NFL draft, he signed with the Minnesota Vikings. He appeared in two games with Minnesota during the 2021 season, but was released in 2022.

== High school career ==
Playing at Bolingbrook High School, Borland committed to Ohio State on April 17, 2015. He chose the Buckeyes over Michigan State, Penn State, and Wisconsin among others. He was rated as a four-star recruit by 247Sports and Scout. He was recruited by Luke Fickell.

== College career ==
Borland redshirted as a freshman in the 2016 season. In the 2017 season, he appeared in 11 games and had 58 total tackles and one sack as a redshirt freshman. In the 2018 season, he was named a captain and had 67 total tackles, three sacks, one pass defense, and two forced fumbles in his redshirt sophomore season. In the 2019 season, he remained as a captain and had 55 total tackles, one sack, and one interception in his redshirt junior season. During the 2020 season, Tuf was elected a three-time captain and was the 2nd leading tackler with 55 total tackles, 1.5 sacks and one interception while helping lead the Buckeyes to a CFP National Championship appearance, including a Sugar Bowl victory over the Clemson Tigers where he was named Defensive MVP.

== Professional career ==
Pre-draft measurables
| Height | Weight | Arm length | Hand span | 40-yard dash | 10-yard split | 20-yard split | 20-yard shuttle | Three-cone drill | Vertical jump | Broad jump | Bench press |
|---|---|---|---|---|---|---|---|---|---|---|---|
| 6 ft 0 1/4 in (1.84 m) | 229 lb (104 kg) | 31 3/8 in (0.80 m) | 9 7/8 in (0.25 m) | 5.00 s | 1.73 s | 2.86 s | 4.30 s | 7.18 s | 32.5 in (0.83 m) | 9 ft 1 in (2.77 m) | 15 reps |
All values from NFL Combine

Borland signed with the Minnesota Vikings as an undrafted free agent on May 5, 2021. He was waived on August 31, 2021, and re-signed to the practice squad the next day. He signed a reserve/future contract with the Vikings on January 10, 2022. He was released on May 16, 2022.

== Coaching career ==
Borland joined Wisconsin's coaching staff as a graduate assistant in 2023.

== Personal life ==
Tuf is the son of Jeny and Kyle Borland. In addition to football, he played basketball and baseball for two years.
