= Luke Farrell (American football) =

American football player (born 1997)

No. 89 – San Francisco 49ers
- Position: Tight end
- Roster status: Active

Personal information
- Born: October 14, 1997 (age 29); Perry, Ohio, U.S.
- Listed height: 6 ft 5 in (1.96 m)
- Listed weight: 250 lb (113 kg)

Career information
- High school: Perry (OH)
- College: Ohio State (2016–2020)
- NFL draft: 2021: 5th round, 145th overall pick

Career history
- Jacksonville Jaguars (2021–2024); San Francisco 49ers (2025–present)

Career NFL statistics as of Week 10, 2026
- Receptions: 50
- Receiving yards: 436
- Receiving touchdowns: 2
- Stats at Pro Football Reference

Luke Farrell (born October 14, 1997) is an American professional football tight end for the San Francisco 49ers of the National Football League (NFL). He played college football for the Ohio State Buckeyes and was drafted by the Jacksonville Jaguars in the fifth round of the 2021 NFL draft.

== College career ==
Farrell played college football for the Ohio State Buckeyes.

== Professional career ==
Pre-draft measurables
Height	Weight	Arm length	Hand span	Wingspan	40-yard dash	10-yard split	20-yard split	20-yard shuttle	Three-cone drill	Vertical jump	Broad jump	Bench press
6 ft 5 1/2 in (1.97 m)	251 lb (114 kg)	33 in (0.84 m)	9 1/4 in (0.23 m)	6 ft 6 7/8 in (2.00 m)	4.81 s	1.69 s	2.75 s	4.33 s	7.14 s	36.5 in (0.93 m)	9 ft 10 in (3.00 m)	22 reps
All values from Pro Day

=== Jacksonville Jaguars ===
Farrell was selected by the Jacksonville Jaguars in the fifth round (145th overall) of the 2021 NFL draft. He signed his four-year rookie contract with Jacksonville on May 20, 2021.

Farrell caught his first pass during a Week 2 23–13 loss to the Denver Broncos. Farrell finished his rookie year with seven receptions for 56 yards in 15 games and four starts.

=== San Francisco 49ers ===
On March 13, 2025, Farrell signed a three-year, $11 million contract with the San Francisco 49ers.

During Week 2 against the New Orleans Saints, Farrell scored his first NFL touchdown.

== NFL career statistics ==
Legend
**Bold**	Career high

=== Regular season ===
Year	Team	Games		Receiving					Fumbles	
Year	Team	GP	GS	Rec	Yds	Avg	Lng	TD	Fum	Lost
2021	JAX	15	4	7	56	8.0	21	0	**1**	0
2022	JAX	**17**	0	4	40	10.0	15	0	0	0
2023	JAX	**17**	**8**	**13**	**155**	**11.9**	**42**	0	0	0
2024	JAX	**17**	**8**	12	67	5.6	11	0	0	0
2025	SF	**17**	4	11	85	7.7	11	**2**	**1**	**1**
2026	SF	9	0	3	33	11.0	14	0	0	0
Career		92	24	50	436	8.7	42	2	2	1

=== Postseason ===
Year	Team	Games		Receiving					Fumbles	
Year	Team	GP	GS	Rec	Yds	Avg	Lng	TD	Fum	Lost
2022	JAX	2	0	0	0	0.0	0	0	0	0
2025	SF	2	0	1	1	1.0	1	0	0	0
Career		4	0	1	1	1.0	1	0	0	0
