= Blake Haubeil =

American football placekicker (born 1999)

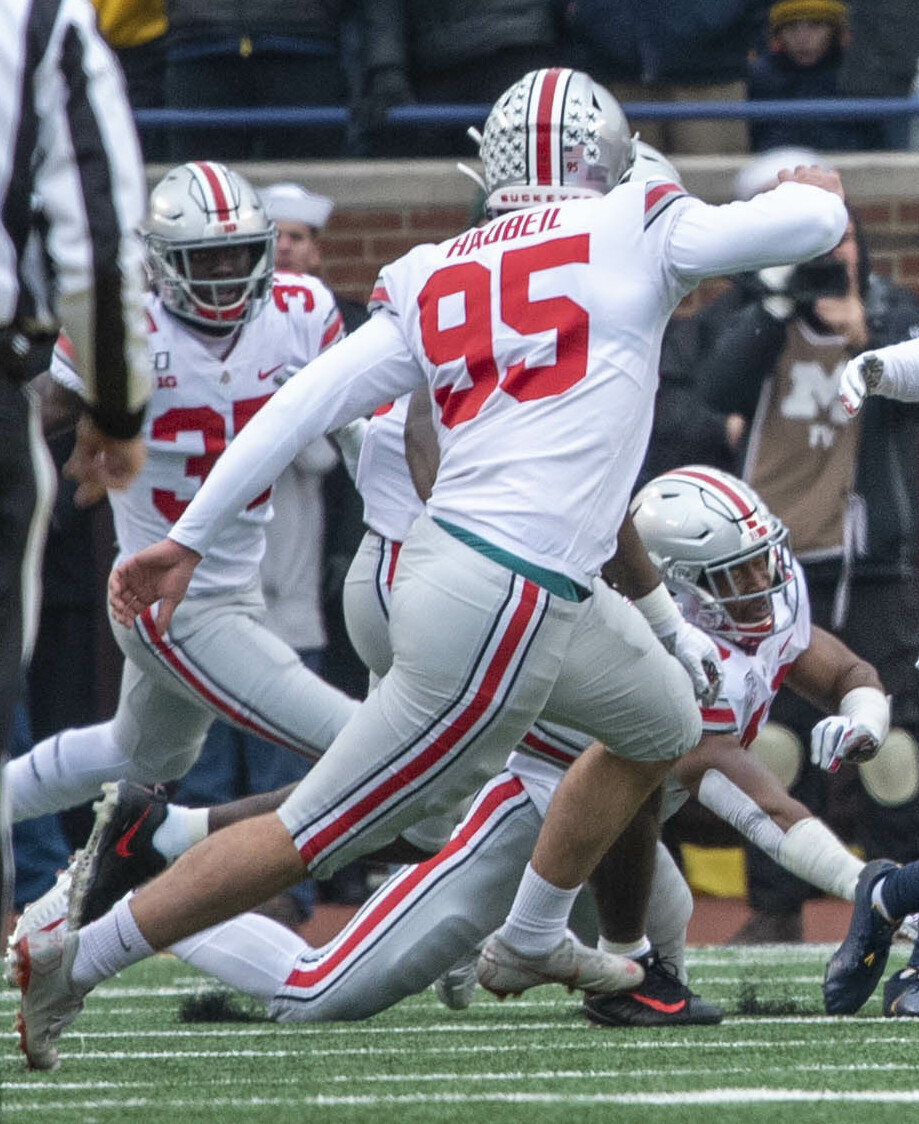
- Haubeil with the Ohio State Buckeyes in 2019

Profile
- Position: Placekicker

Personal information
- Born: April 5, 1999 (age 27); Buffalo, New York, U.S.
- Listed height: 6 ft 3 in (1.91 m)
- Listed weight: 230 lb (104 kg)

Career information
- High school: Canisius (Buffalo, New York)
- College: Ohio State (2016–2020)
- NFL draft: 2021: undrafted

Career history
- Tennessee Titans (2021)*; Carolina Panthers (2021)*
- * Offseason or practice squad member only
- Stats at Pro Football Reference

Blake Haubeil (born April 5, 1999) is an American professional football placekicker. He played college football for the Ohio State Buckeyes and was signed as an undrafted free agent by the Titans after the 2021 NFL draft.

== College career ==
Haubeil was ranked as a three–star recruit by 247Sports.com coming out of high school. He committed to Ohio State on July 24, 2015.

== Professional career ==
Pre-draft measurables
Height	Weight	Arm length	Hand span
6 ft 4 in (1.93 m)	233 lb (106 kg)	32 3/8 in (0.82 m)	8 7/8 in (0.23 m)
All values from Pro Day

=== Tennessee Titans ===
Haubeil was signed as an undrafted free agent by the Tennessee Titans on May 1, 2021. He was waived on August 1, 2021.

=== Carolina Panthers ===
On December 29, 2021, Haubeil was signed to the Carolina Panthers practice squad. He was released on January 4, 2022.
