= 2020 All-Big Ten Conference football team =

American college football all-star team

The 2020 All-Big Ten Conference football team consists of American football players chosen as All-Big Ten Conference players for the 2020 Big Ten Conference football season. The conference recognizes two official All-Big Ten selectors: (1) the Big Ten conference coaches selected separate offensive and defensive units and named first-, second- and third-team players (the "Coaches" team); and (2) a panel of sports writers and broadcasters covering the Big Ten also selected offensive and defensive units and named first-, second- and third-team players (the "Media" team).

== Offensive selections ==
=== Quarterbacks ===
- Justin Fields, Ohio State (Coaches-1; Media-1)
- Michael Penix Jr., Indiana (Coaches-2; Media-2)
- Peyton Ramsey, Northwestern (Coaches-3; Media-3)

=== Running backs ===
- Mohamed Ibrahim, Minnesota (Coaches-1; Media-1)
- Tyler Goodson, Iowa (Coaches-1; Media-1)
- Stevie Scott III, Indiana (Coaches-2; Media-2)
- Trey Sermon, Ohio State (Coaches-2; Media-2)
- Zander Horvath, Purdue (Coaches-3; Media-3)
- Jake Funk, Maryland (Coaches-3)
- Chase Brown, Illinois (Media-3)

=== Wide receivers ===
- David Bell, Purdue (Coaches-2; Media-1)
- Ty Fryfogle, Indiana (Coaches-2; Media-1)
- Chris Olave, Ohio State (Coaches-1; Media-2)
- Garrett Wilson, Ohio State (Coaches-1; Media-2)
- Rashod Bateman, Minnesota (Coaches-3; Media-3)
- Jahan Dotson, Penn State (Coaches-3; Media-3)

=== Centers ===
- Josh Myers, Ohio State (Coaches-1; Media-2)
- Tyler Linderbaum, Iowa (Coaches-2; Media-1)
- Michal Menet, Penn State (Coaches-3; Media-3)

=== Guards ===
- Wyatt Davis, Ohio State (Coaches-1; Media-1)
- Kendrick Green, Illinois (Coaches-1; Media-1)
- Cole Banwart, Iowa (Coaches-2; Media-2)
- Mike Miranda, Penn State (Coaches-2; Media-2)
- Logan Bruss, Wisconsin (Coaches-3; Media-3)
- Harry Miller, Ohio State (Coaches-3)
- Conner Olson, Minnesota (Media-3)

=== Tackles ===
- Alaric Jackson, Iowa (Coaches-1; Media-1)
- Thayer Munford, Ohio State (Coaches-1; Media-1)
- Cole Van Lanen, Wisconsin (Coaches-1; Media-2)
- Will Fries, Penn State (Coaches-2)
- Nicholas Petit-Frere, Ohio State (Coaches-2)
- Peter Skoronski, Northwestern (Coaches-3; Media-2)
- Blaise Andries, Minnesota (Media-3)
- Rasheed Walker, Penn State (Media-3)

=== Tight ends ===
- Pat Freiermuth, Penn State (Coaches-1; Media-2)
- Jake Ferguson, Wisconsin (Coaches-2; Media-1)
- Peyton Hendershot, Indiana (Coaches-3; Media-3)

== Defensive selections ==
=== Defensive linemen ===
- Chauncey Golston, Iowa (Coaches-1; Media-1)
- Daviyon Nixon, Iowa (Coaches-1; Media-1)
- Shaka Toney, Penn State (Coaches-1; Media-1)
- Jerome Johnson, Indiana (Coaches-2; Media-1)
- Odafe Oweh, Penn State (Coaches-1; Media-2)
- Owen Carney, Illinois (Coaches-2; Media-2)
- Tommy Togiai, Ohio State (Coaches-2; Media-2)
- Zach VanValkenburg, Iowa (Coaches-2; Media-2)
- Jonathon Cooper, Ohio State (Coaches-3; Media-3)
- Zach Harrison, Ohio State (Coaches-2)
- Haskell Garrett, Ohio State (Coaches-3)
- George Karlaftis, Purdue (Coaches-2)
- Eku Leota, Northwestern (Media-3)
- Isaiahh Loudermilk, Wisconsin (Media-3)
- Kwity Paye, Michigan (Media-2)

=== Linebackers ===
- Paddy Fisher, Northwestern (Coaches-1; Media-1)
- Micah McFadden, Indiana (Coaches-1; Media-1)
- Olakunle Fatukasi, Rutgers (Coaches-2; Media-1)
- Pete Werner, Ohio State (Coaches-1; Media-3)
- Derrick Barnes, Purdue (Coaches-2; Media-3)
- Baron Browning, Ohio State (Coaches-3)
- Blake Gallagher, Northwestern (Coaches-2; Media-2)
- Jake Hansen, Illinois (Coaches-3; Media-2)
- Nick Niemann, Iowa (Coaches-3)
- Jack Sanborn, Wisconsin (Media-3)
- Antjuan Simmons, Michigan State (Coaches-3; Media-2)

=== Defensive backs ===
- Brandon Joseph, Northwestern (Coaches-1; Media-1)
- Greg Newsome II, Northwestern (Coaches-1; Media-1)
- Shaun Wade, Ohio State (Coaches-1; Media-1)
- Shakur Brown, Michigan State (Coaches-1; Media-2)
- Jamar Johnson, Indiana (Coaches-2; Media-1)
- Tiawan Mullen, Indiana (Coaches-2; Media-1)
- Tre Avery, Rutgers (Coaches-3; Media-3)
- Jaquan Brisker, Penn State (Coaches-3)
- Jack Koerner, Iowa (Coaches-3; Media-2)
- Devon Matthews, Indiana (Coaches-3; Media-3)
- Joey Porter Jr., Penn State (Media-3)
- Cam Taylor-Britt, Nebraska (Coaches-2)
- Lamont Wade, Penn State (Media-3)
- Caesar Williams, Wisconsin (Coaches-3)
- Jaylin Williams, Indiana (Coaches-2; Media-2)

== Special teams ==
=== Kickers ===
- Connor Culp, Nebraska (Coaches-1; Media-1)
- Charles Campbell, Indiana (Coaches-2; Media-2)
- Keith Duncan, Iowa (Coaches-3; Media-3)

=== Punters ===
- Tory Taylor, Iowa (Coaches-1; Media-1)
- Adam Korsak, Rutgers (Coaches-3; Media-2)
- Drue Chrisman, Ohio State (Coaches-2)
- Blake Hayes, Illinois (Media-3)

=== Return specialist ===
- Aron Cruickshank, Rutgers (Coaches-1; Media-1)
- Giles Jackson, Michigan (Coaches-3; Media-2)
- Charlie Jones, Iowa (Coaches-2; Media-3)

== Key ==
Bold = Consensus first-team selection by both the coaches and media

Coaches = Selected by the Big Ten Conference coaches

Media = Selected by the conference media

== See also ==
- 2020 College Football All-America Team
