= 2020 Big Ten Conference football season =

- League: NCAA Division I Football Bowl Subdivision
- Sport: Football
- Duration: October 24, 2020 through December 19, 2020
- Teams: 14
- TV partner(s): Fox Sports (Fox/FS1, Big Ten Network), ESPN (ESPN, ESPN2, ABC)

2021 NFL Draft
- Top draft pick: Justin Fields (Ohio State)
- Picked by: Chicago Bears, 11th overall

Regular season
- East Division champions: Ohio State
- West Division champions: Northwestern

Championship Game
- Champions: Ohio State
- Runners-up: Northwestern
- Finals MVP: Trey Sermon, Ohio State

Football seasons
- 2019 2021

2020 Big Ten Conference football standings
	Conf.			Overall
Team	W		L	W		L
East Division
No. 2 Ohio State xy$^	5	–	0	7	–	1
No. 12 Indiana	6	–	1	6	–	2
Penn State	4	–	5	4	–	5
Maryland	2	–	3	2	–	3
Rutgers	3	–	6	3	–	6
Michigan	2	–	4	2	–	4
Michigan State	2	–	5	2	–	5
West Division
No. 10 Northwestern xy	6	–	1	7	–	2
No. 16 Iowa	6	–	2	6	–	2
Wisconsin	3	–	3	4	–	3
Minnesota	3	–	4	3	–	4
Nebraska	3	–	5	3	–	5
Purdue	2	–	4	2	–	4
Illinois	2	–	6	2	–	6
Championship: Ohio State 22, Northwestern 10
^ – College Football Playoff participant; $ – Conference champion; x – Division champion/co-champions; y – Championship game participant; Note: Due to COVID-19, the Big Ten suspended the season on August 11, but later decided to begin play on October 24. In addition to the title game that was played on December 19, the conference seeded all remaining teams for "championship week" games.; Rankings from AP Poll.

The 2020 Big Ten conference football season is the 125th season of college football play for the Big Ten Conference and part of the 2020 NCAA Division I FBS football season. This was the Big Ten's seventh season with 14 teams. The defending league champion was Ohio State.

Due to the COVID-19 pandemic in the United States, the conference voted on August 11, 2020, to indefinitely postpone all fall athletics, including football, citing the worsening trends of the pandemic in the country. On September 16, the conference approved a shortened, eight-game football season beginning October 24, with the final week featuring the Big Ten championship game on December 19.

The Big Ten had two new coaches for the 2020 season. Rutgers hired former coach Greg Schiano to serve as head coach, replacing Chris Ash who was fired during the 2019 season. Michigan State head coach Mark Dantonio announced on February 4, 2020, that he was retiring from his position. The Spartans announced the hiring of Mel Tucker as the new head coach on February 12, 2020. On December 13, Illinois fired its head coach Lovie Smith, and on December 19 announced the hiring of Bret Bielema as its new head coach.

== Delay of season ==
On July 9, 2020, due to the COVID-19 pandemic in the United States, the Big Ten announced that all competition in fall sports, including football, would be played exclusively in-conference, in order to "have the greatest flexibility to adjust its own operations throughout the season and make quick decisions in real-time". An updated 10-game conference-only schedule was released on August 5, 2020.

On August 11, in the wake of multiple Group of Five conferences deciding to do so, the council of the Big Ten voted 11–3 to postpone fall athletics for the 2020–21 season (with all but Iowa, Nebraska, and Ohio State voting in favor). Commissioner Kevin Warren cited negative trends and uncertainties surrounding COVID-19 as a factor in the decision. The conference stated that it would evaluate options, including possibly playing in spring 2021 instead. After the decision to postpone the season, the Big Ten formed a taskforce to investigate options for a return to play. President Donald Trump criticized the Big Ten's decision to postpone fall football, as part of his general criticism of U.S. colleges and universities that have not resumed on-campus activities. All other Power Five conferences besides the Pac-12 (which also postponed its season shortly after the Big Ten's decision) were still planning to play in the fall.

On September 14, it was reported that the Big Ten was considering the possibility of reversing its decision and playing a shortened conference football season as early as mid-to-late October. On September 16, the Big Ten approved an eight-game conference season that would begin October 24, and conclude on December 19 with the Big Ten Championship Game. The conference originally planned to hold a slate of cross-division matchups between seeds alongside the championship game.

The conference instituted a daily antigen testing protocol from September 30; PCR tests are used to confirm positives found via antigen testing. Players who test positive on both tests are removed from play for at least 21 days and undergo cardiac tests during this period, and will have to be cleared by a cardiologist before they can return to play. Positivity rates among participating teams and the local population will also be a factor: teams with a positivity rate above 5% or a population positivity rate above 7% will be required to halt all activity for seven days.

== Preseason ==
2020 Big Ten Spring Football and number of signees on signing day:

=== Recruiting classes ===
Rankings
Team	ESPN	Rivals	Scout & 24/7	Signees
Illinois	63	90	88	14
Indiana	55	48	58	20
Iowa	32	35	35	21
Maryland	33	32	31	28
Michigan	11	11	14	23
Michigan State	46	36	44	22
Minnesota	36	38	38	24
Nebraska	24	17	20	24
Northwestern	40	53	47	17
Ohio State	5	5	5	25
Penn State	12	15	15	27
Purdue	28	30	32	20
Rutgers	60	67	61	23
Wisconsin	26	28	26	20

=== Big Ten Media Days ===
==== Preseason media polls ====
Below are the results of the media poll with total points received next to each school and first-place votes in parentheses. For the 2020 poll, Ohio State was voted as the favorite to win both the East Division and the Big Ten Championship Game. This is the 10th iteration of the preseason media poll conducted by Cleveland.com, which polls at least one credentialed media member for each Big Ten team. Only twice in the last ten years has the media accurately predicted the Big Ten champion.

East
Predicted finish	Team	Votes (1st place)
1	Ohio State	237 (33)
2	Penn State	204 (1)
3	Michigan	169
4	Indiana	134
5	Michigan State	94
6	Maryland	76
7	Rutgers	38

West
Predicted finish	Team	Votes (1st place)
1	Wisconsin	221 (19)
2	Minnesota	209.5 (14)
3	Iowa	157
4	Nebraska	117
5	Purdue	105
6	Northwestern	87.5 (1)
7	Illinois	55

Media poll (Big Ten Championship)
Rank	Team	Votes
1	Ohio State over Wisconsin	19
2	Ohio State over Minnesota	13
3	Ohio State over Northwestern	1
4	Penn State over Minnesota	1

== Rankings ==
The AP and Coaches Polls ranked Big Ten teams in the preseason, but then removed those teams after the league suspended play.

The Coaches Poll returned to ranking Big Ten teams with the Sept. 20 poll. The AP Poll returned Big Ten teams to the rankings with the Sept. 27 poll.

		Pre	Wk 1	Wk 2	Wk 3	Wk 4	Wk 5	Wk 6	Wk 7	Wk 8	Wk 9	Wk 10	Wk 11	Wk 12	Wk 13	Wk 14	Wk 15	Final
Illinois	AP																	
Illinois	C																	
Illinois	CFP	Not released																
Indiana	AP	RV					RV	RV	17	13	10	9	12	10	8	7	7	12
Indiana	C	RV						RV	19	13	10	10	12	11	9	7	8	13
Indiana	CFP	Not released											12	12	12	11	11	
Iowa	AP	24			RV	RV	RV	RV				RV	RV	24	19	18	17	16
Iowa	C	23		RV	RV	RV	RV	RV	RV				RV	24	18	17	16	15
Iowa	CFP	Not released											24	19	16	16	15	
Maryland	AP										RV							
Maryland	C										RV	RV	RV					
Maryland	CFP	Not released																
Michigan	AP	15			23	20	19	18	13	23								
Michigan	C	15		19	21	19	19	17	14	25	RV							
Michigan	CFP	Not released																
Michigan State	AP									RV								
Michigan State	C									RV								
Michigan State	CFP	Not released																
Minnesota	AP	19			RV	25	24	21	RV									
Minnesota	C	18		22	RV	RV	25	21	RV									
Minnesota	CFP	Not released																
Nebraska	AP																	
Nebraska	C	RV		RV	RV	RV	RV	RV										
Nebraska	CFP	Not released																
Northwestern	AP	RV							RV	RV	23	19	11	16	15	15	15	10
Northwestern	C								RV	RV	23	20	13	17	14	14	13	10
Northwestern	CFP	Not released											8	14	14	14	14	
Ohio State	AP	2 (16)			6 (4)	6 (2)	6	5	3	3	3 (1)	3 (1)	3	3	3	3	3	2
Ohio State	C	2 (17)		10 (2)	6 (2)	6 (2)	5 (2)	5 (2)	3 (2)	3 (2)	3 (3)	3 (2)	3 (1)	4 (1)	4 (1)	4	3	2
Ohio State	CFP	Not released											4	4	4	4	3	
Penn State	AP	9			10	9	9	8	18	RV								
Penn State	C	7		13	10	8	8	7	17	RV								
Penn State	CFP	Not released																
Purdue	AP								RV	RV	RV							
Purdue	C								RV	RV	RV	RV	RV					
Purdue	CFP	Not released																
Rutgers	AP																	
Rutgers	C																	
Rutgers	CFP	Not released																
Wisconsin	AP	12			19	16	16	14T	9	10	13	10	18	18	25			RV
Wisconsin	C	12		17	18	14	15	14	11	11	14	12	20	19	25	RV	RV	RV
Wisconsin	CFP	Not released											16	16				

Legend
	Improvement in ranking
	Drop in ranking
	Not ranked previous week
	No change in ranking from previous week
RV	Received votes but were not ranked in Top 25 of poll
т	Tied with team above or below also with this symbol

== Schedule ==
Index to colors and formatting
Big Ten member won
Big Ten member lost
Big Ten teams in **bold**

All times Eastern time.

† denotes Homecoming game

=== Regular season schedule ===
The Regular season was scheduled to begin on September 3 and end on November 28. The Big Ten Championship Game was scheduled to be held on December 5, 2020.

On July 9, 2020, the Big Ten Conference announced that all non-conference contests in all fall sports, including football, would be canceled due to the COVID-19 pandemic. The league then moved to institute a 10-game, conference-only schedule in football, which would include multiple open weeks for teams in order to introduce flexibility into the schedule. On August 5, the Big Ten released the new reconfigured 10-game conference-only schedule. On August 11, 2020, the conference decided to postpone all fall sports and evaluate option to restart competition in spring 2021.

On September 16, 2020, the Big Ten announced that the football season would start on the weekend of October 24. There will be an eight-game regular season taking place over eight weeks. Each team will play all the other teams in its division, plus two crossover games with teams in the other division. Then the league championship game will be played on December 19. Also on the weekend of December 19, there will be crossover divisional games featuring the 2nd place teams from each division facing off, the 3rd places teams meeting each other, etc. The new schedule was released on September 19.

On December 9, the Big Ten waived its rule of requiring teams to play a minimum of six league games to be eligible for the Big Ten Championship Game, allowing Ohio State (5-0) to represent the East Division.

==== Week #1 ====
Date	Time	Visiting team	Home team	Site	TV	Result	Attendance	Ref.
October 23	8:00 p.m.	**Illinois**	No. 14T **Wisconsin**	Camp Randall Stadium • Madison, WI	BTN	**WIS** 45–7	0	
October 24	12:00 p.m.	**Rutgers**	**Michigan State**	Spartan Stadium • East Lansing, MI	BTN	**RUT** 38–27	376	
October 24	12:00 p.m.	**Nebraska**	No. 5 **Ohio State**	Ohio Stadium • Columbus, OH	FOX	**OSU** 52–17	1,344	
October 24	3:30 p.m.	No. 8 **Penn State**	**Indiana**	Memorial Stadium • Bloomington, IN	FS1	**IU** 36–35 ^{OT}	995	
October 24	3:30 p.m.	**Iowa**	**Purdue**	Ross-Ade Stadium • West Lafayette, IN	BTN	**PUR** 24–20	900	
October 24	7:30 p.m.	No. 18 **Michigan**	No. 21 **Minnesota**	TCF Bank Stadium • Minneapolis, MN (Little Brown Jug, College GameDay)	ABC	**MICH** 49–24	589	
October 24	7:30 p.m.	**Maryland**	**Northwestern**	Ryan Field • Evanston, IL	BTN	**NW** 43–3	0	
^{#}Rankings from AP Poll released prior to game. All times are in Eastern Time.

==== Week #2 ====
Date	Time	Visiting team	Home team	Site	TV	Result	Attendance	Ref.
October 30	7:30 p.m.	**Minnesota**	**Maryland**	Maryland Stadium • College Park, MD	ESPN	**MD** 45–44 ^{OT}	0	
October 31	12:00 p.m.	**Michigan State**	No. 13 **Michigan**	Michigan Stadium • Ann Arbor, MI (Paul Bunyan Trophy)	FOX	**MSU** 27–24	615	
October 31	12:00 p.m.	**Purdue**	**Illinois**	Memorial Stadium • Champaign, IL (Purdue Cannon)	BTN	**PUR** 31–24	838	
October 31	3:30 p.m.	**Northwestern**	**Iowa**	Kinnick Stadium • Iowa City, IA	ESPN	**NW** 21–20	1,432	
October 31	3:30 p.m.	No. 17 **Indiana**	**Rutgers**	SHI Stadium • Piscataway, NJ	BTN	**IU** 37–21	0	
October 31	7:30 p.m.	No. 3 **Ohio State**	No. 18 **Penn State**	Beaver Stadium • University Park, PA (OSU-PSU rivalry)	ABC	**OSU** 38–25	1,500	
~~October 31~~	~~3:30 p.m.~~	No. ~~9~~ ~~**Wisconsin**~~	~~**Nebraska**~~	~~Memorial Stadium~~ • ~~Lincoln, NE~~ (~~Freedom Trophy~~)	~~FS1~~	**CANCELED**	–	
^{#}Rankings from AP Poll released prior to game. All times are in Eastern Time.

The Wisconsin at Nebraska game was canceled due to a COVID-19 outbreak at Wisconsin.

==== Week #3 ====
Date	Time	Visiting team	Home team	Site	TV	Result	Attendance	Ref.
November 7	12:00 p.m.	No. 23 **Michigan**	No. 13 **Indiana**	Memorial Stadium • Bloomington, IN	FS1	**IU** 38–21	1,034	
November 7	12:00 p.m.	**Nebraska**	**Northwestern**	Ryan Field • Evanston, IL	BTN	**NW** 21–13	0	
November 7	12:00 p.m.	**Michigan State**	**Iowa**	Kinnick Stadium • Iowa City, IA	ESPN	**IA** 49–7	1,441	
November 7	3:30 p.m.	**Maryland**	**Penn State**	Beaver Stadium • University Park, PA (MD-PSU rivalry)	BTN	**MD** 35–19	1,500	
November 7	3:30 p.m.	**Minnesota**	**Illinois**	Memorial Stadium • Champaign, IL	BTN	**MN** 41–14	863	
November 7	7:30 p.m.	**Rutgers**	No. 3 **Ohio State**	Ohio Stadium • Columbus, OH	BTN	**OSU** 49–27	1,275	
~~November 7~~	~~3:30 p.m.~~	~~**Purdue**~~	No. ~~10~~ ~~**Wisconsin**~~	~~Camp Randall Stadium~~ • ~~Madison, WI~~	~~ABC~~	**CANCELED**	–	
^{#}Rankings from AP Poll released prior to game. All times are in Eastern Time.

The Purdue at Wisconsin game was canceled due to a COVID-19 outbreak at Wisconsin.

==== Week #4 ====
Date	Time	Visiting team	Home team	Site	TV	Result	Attendance	Ref.
November 13	7:00 p.m.	**Iowa**	**Minnesota**	TCF Bank Stadium • Minneapolis, MN (Floyd of Rosedale)	FS1	**IA** 35–7	771	
November 14	12:00 p.m.	**Penn State**	**Nebraska**	Memorial Stadium • Lincoln, NE	FS1	**NEB** 30–23	0	
November 14	12:00 p.m.	No. 10 **Indiana**	**Michigan State**	Spartan Stadium • East Lansing, MI (Old Brass Spittoon)	ABC	**IU** 24–0	340	
November 14	1:00 p.m.	**Illinois**	**Rutgers**	SHI Stadium • Piscataway, NJ	BTN	**ILL** 23–20	0	
November 14	5:00 p.m.	No. 23 **Northwestern**	**Purdue**	Ross-Ade Stadium • West Lafayette, IN	BTN	**NW** 27–20	886	
November 14	7:30 p.m.	No. 13 **Wisconsin**	**Michigan**	Michigan Stadium • Ann Arbor, MI	ABC	**WIS** 49–11	605	
~~November 14~~	~~3:30 p.m.~~	No. ~~3~~ ~~**Ohio State**~~	~~**Maryland**~~	~~Maryland Stadium~~ • ~~College Park, MD~~	~~BTN~~	**CANCELED**	–	
^{#}Rankings from AP Poll released prior to game. All times are in Eastern Time.

The Ohio State at Maryland game was canceled due to a COVID-19 outbreak at Maryland.

==== Week #5 ====
Date	Time	Visiting team	Home team	Site	TV	Result	Attendance	Ref.
November 20	7:30 p.m.	**Purdue**	**Minnesota**	TCF Bank Stadium • Minneapolis, MN	BTN	**MIN** 34–31	593	
November 21	12:00 p.m.	No. 9 **Indiana**	No. 3 **Ohio State**	Ohio Stadium • Columbus, OH	FOX	**OSU** 42–35	635	
November 21	12:00 p.m.	**Illinois**	**Nebraska**	Memorial Stadium • Lincoln, NE	FS1	**ILL** 41–23	0	
November 21	3:30 p.m.	No. 10 **Wisconsin**	No. 19 **Northwestern**	Ryan Field • Evanston, IL	ABC	**NW** 17–7	1	
November 21	3:30 p.m.	**Iowa**	**Penn State**	Beaver Stadium • University Park, PA	BTN	**IA** 41–21	1,500	
November 21	7:30 p.m.	**Michigan**	**Rutgers**	SHI Stadium • Piscataway, NJ	BTN	**MICH** 48–42 ^{3OT}	0	
~~November 21~~	~~12:00 p.m.~~	~~**Michigan State**~~	~~**Maryland**~~	~~Maryland Stadium~~ • ~~College Park, MD~~	~~BTN~~	**CANCELED**	–	
^{†}Homecoming. ^{#}Rankings from AP Poll released prior to game. All times are in Eastern Time.

Michigan State at Maryland was canceled due to COVID-19 cases at Maryland.

==== Week #6 ====
Date	Time	Visiting team	Home team	Site	TV	Result	Attendance	Ref.
November 27	1:00 p.m.	**Nebraska**	**Iowa**	Kinnick Stadium • Iowa City, IA (Heroes Trophy)	FOX	**IA** 26–20	1,469	
November 28	12:00 p.m.	**Penn State**	**Michigan**	Michigan Stadium • Ann Arbor, MI (Big Noon Kickoff)	ABC	**PSU** 27–17	0	
November 28	12:00 p.m.	**Maryland**	No. 12 **Indiana**	Memorial Stadium • Bloomington, IN	ESPN2	**IU** 27–11	963	
November 28	3:30 p.m.	No. 11 **Northwestern**	**Michigan State**	Spartan Stadium • East Lansing, MI	ESPN	**MSU** 29–20	0	
November 28	4:00 p.m.	**Rutgers**	**Purdue**	Ross-Ade Stadium • West Lafayette, IN	FS1	**RUT** 37–30	728	
~~November 28~~	~~12:00 p.m.~~	No. ~~3~~ ~~**Ohio State**~~	~~**Illinois**~~	~~Memorial Stadium~~ • ~~Champaign, IL~~ (~~Illibuck~~)	~~FS1~~	**CANCELED**	–	
~~November 28~~	~~2:00 p.m.~~	~~**Minnesota**~~	No. ~~18~~ ~~**Wisconsin**~~	~~Camp Randall Stadium~~ • ~~Madison, WI~~ (~~Paul Bunyan's Axe~~)	~~BTN~~	**CANCELED**	–	
^{†}Homecoming. ^{#}Rankings from AP Poll released prior to game. All times are in Eastern Time.

Ohio State at Illinois was canceled after positive COVID-19 at Ohio State.

Minnesota at Wisconsin was canceled after positive COVID-19 tests at Minnesota.

==== Week #7 ====
Date	Time	Visiting team	Home team	Site	TV	Result	Attendance	Ref.
December 5	12:00 p.m.	No. 3 **Ohio State**	**Michigan State**	Spartan Stadium • East Lansing, MI	ABC	**OSU** 52–12	0	
December 5	12:00 p.m.	**Nebraska**	**Purdue**	Ross-Ade Stadium • West Lafayette, IN	BTN	**NEB** 37–27	808	
December 5	12:00 p.m.	**Penn State**	**Rutgers**	SHI Stadium • Piscataway, NJ	FS1	**PSU** 23–7	0	
December 5	3:30 p.m.	No. 10 **Indiana**	No. 18 **Wisconsin**	Camp Randall Stadium • Madison, WI	ABC	**IU** 14–6	0	
December 5	3:30 p.m.	No. 24 **Iowa**	**Illinois**	Memorial Stadium • Champaign, IL	FS1	**IA** 35–21	875	
~~December 5~~	~~12:00 p.m.~~	No. ~~16~~ ~~**Northwestern**~~	~~**Minnesota**~~	~~TCF Bank Stadium~~ • ~~Minneapolis, MN~~	~~BTN~~	**CANCELED**	–	
~~December 5~~	~~3:30 p.m.~~	~~**Maryland**~~	~~**Michigan**~~	~~Michigan Stadium~~ • ~~Ann Arbor, MI~~	~~BTN~~	**CANCELED**	–	
^{†}Homecoming. ^{#}Rankings from AP Poll released prior to game. All times are in Eastern Time.

Northwestern at Minnesota was canceled after COVID issues at Minnesota.

Maryland at Michigan was canceled after COVID issues at Michigan.

==== Week #8 ====
Date	Time	Visiting team	Home team	Site	TV	Result	Attendance	Ref.
December 12	12:00 p.m.	**Minnesota**	**Nebraska**	Memorial Stadium • Lincoln, NE ($5 Bits of Broken Chair Trophy)	FS1	**MIN** 24–17	0	
December 12	12:00 p.m.	**Rutgers**	**Maryland**	Maryland Stadium • College Park, MD	BTN	**RUT** 27–24 ^{OT}	0	
December 12	12:00 p.m.	**Illinois**	No. 15 **Northwestern**	Ryan Field • Evanston, IL (Land of Lincoln Trophy)	ESPN2	**NW** 28–10	0	
December 12	12:00 p.m.	**Michigan State**	**Penn State**	Beaver Stadium • University Park, PA (Land Grant Trophy)	ABC	**PSU** 39–24	0	
December 12	3:30 p.m.	No. 25 **Wisconsin**	No. 19 **Iowa**	Kinnick Stadium • Iowa City, IA (Heartland Trophy)	FS1	**IA** 28–7	1,445	
~~December 12~~	~~12:00 p.m.~~	~~**Michigan**~~	No. ~~3~~ ~~**Ohio State**~~	~~Ohio Stadium~~ • ~~Columbus, OH~~ (~~The Game~~)	~~FOX~~	**CANCELED**	–	
~~December 12~~	~~3:30 p.m.~~	~~**Purdue**~~	No. ~~8~~ ~~**Indiana**~~	~~Memorial Stadium~~ • ~~Bloomington, IN~~ (~~Old Oaken Bucket~~)	~~BTN~~	**CANCELED**	–	
^{†}Homecoming. ^{#}Rankings from AP Poll released prior to game. All times are in Eastern Time.

Michigan at Ohio State game was canceled after COVID-19 issues at Michigan.

Purdue at Indiana was canceled by mutual agreement after increased COVID-19 issues at both schools.

==== Week #9: Big Ten Championship Game and Champions Week games ====
Logo of the Champions Week

Date	Time	Visiting team	Home team	Site	TV	Result	Attendance	Ref.
**Big Ten Championship Game**
December 19	12:00 p.m.	No. 15 **Northwestern**	No. 3 **Ohio State**	Lucas Oil Stadium • Indianapolis, IN	FOX	**OSU** 22–10	3,178	
**Champions Week Games**
December 18	7:30 p.m.	**Nebraska**	**Rutgers**	SHI Stadium • Piscataway, NJ	BTN	**NEB** 28–21	0	
December 19	4:00 p.m.	**Minnesota**	**Wisconsin**	Camp Randall Stadium • Madison, WI (Paul Bunyan's Axe)	BTN	**WIS** 20–17 ^{OT}	0	
December 19	5:30 p.m.	**Illinois**	**Penn State**	Beaver Stadium • University Park, PA	FS1	**PSU** 56–21	0	
~~December 18~~	~~7:30 p.m.~~	~~**Purdue**~~	No. ~~7~~ ~~**Indiana**~~	~~Memorial Stadium~~ • ~~Bloomington, IN~~ (~~Old Oaken Bucket~~)	~~BTN~~	**CANCELED**	–	
~~December 19~~	~~7:00 p.m.~~	~~**Michigan**~~	No. ~~18~~ ~~**Iowa**~~	~~Kinnick Stadium~~ • ~~Iowa City, IA~~	~~ESPN~~	**CANCELED**	–	
~~December 19~~	~~7:30 p.m.~~	~~**Michigan State**~~	~~**Maryland**~~	~~Maryland Stadium~~ • ~~College Park, MD~~	~~BTN~~	**CANCELED**	–	
^{#}Rankings from AP Poll released prior to game. All times are in Eastern Time.

Note: The additional games were originally planned to be cross-divisional matchups of the teams with the same standings – second place vs. second place, third place vs. third place, and so on. The schedule was changed to preserve rivalry games that were canceled during the regular season, and to avoid rematches.

Indiana-Purdue game canceled due to COVID-19 issues at both schools.

Nebraska-Rutgers game adjusted from a 3:00 p.m. to a 6:30 p.m. kickoff time on Friday, December 18 after the cancellation of the Indiana-Purdue game.

Michigan-Iowa game canceled due to COVID-19 issues at Michigan.

Maryland-Michigan State game canceled due to COVID-19 issues at Maryland.

=== Canceled regular season games ===
The following non-conference games were canceled due to the COVID-19 pandemic:

Sept. 3

- Florida Atlantic at Minnesota

Sept. 4

- Illinois State at Illinois

Sept. 5

- Bowling Green at Ohio State
- Kent State at Penn State
- Michigan at Washington
- Monmouth at Rutgers
- Northern Iowa at Iowa
- Towson at Maryland

Sept. 12

- Ball State at Michigan
- Central Michigan at Nebraska
- Connecticut at Illinois
- Iowa State at Iowa
- Memphis at Purdue
- Michigan State at BYU
- Northern Illinois at Maryland
- Ohio State at Oregon
- Penn State at Virginia Tech
- Southern Illinois at Wisconsin
- Syracuse at Rutgers
- Tennessee Tech at Minnesota
- Tulane at Northwestern
- Western Kentucky at Indiana

Sept. 19

- Air Force at Purdue
- Appalachian State at Wisconsin
- Arkansas State at Michigan
- Ball State at Indiana
- Bowling Green at Illinois
- Buffalo at Ohio State
- Central Michigan at Northwestern
- Maryland at West Virginia
- Rutgers at Temple
- San Jose State at Penn State
- South Dakota State at Nebraska
- Toledo at Michigan State

Sept. 26

- BYU at Minnesota
- Cincinnati at Nebraska
- Indiana at Connecticut
- Miami (FL) at Michigan State
- Northern Illinois at Iowa
- Purdue at Boston College

Oct. 3

- Wisconsin vs. Notre Dame (at Green Bay, WI)

Nov. 14

- Morgan State at Northwestern

== Postseason ==
=== Bowl games ===
Games below do not include bowl games that Big Ten teams may be selected for in the College Football Playoff semifinals (the Rose Bowl and Sugar Bowl on January 1, 2021) or potential At-Large bids in New Year's Six Bowls (the Cotton Bowl on December 30, 2020, and Peach Bowl on January 1, 2021).

Five Big Ten teams accepted bowl bids for the 2020–21 season, with Ohio State being selected for the College Football Playoff.

Bowl game	Date	Site	Television	Time (EST)	Big Ten team	Opponent	Score	Attendance	Ref.
Duke's Mayo Bowl	December 30	Bank of America Stadium • Charlotte, NC	ESPN	12:00 p.m.	**Wisconsin**	Wake Forest	**W** 42–28	1,500	
~~Music City Bowl~~	~~December 30~~	~~Nissan Stadium • Nashville, TN~~	~~ESPN~~	~~4:00 p.m.~~	~~#15 **Iowa**~~	~~Missouri~~	**CANCELED**	–	
Citrus Bowl	January 1	Camping World Stadium • Orlando, FL	ABC	1:00 p.m.	#14 **Northwestern**	Auburn	**W** 35–19	13,039	
Outback Bowl	January 2	Raymond James Stadium • Tampa, FL	ABC	12:30 p.m.	#11 **Indiana**	Mississippi	**L** 20–26	11,025	
**College Football Playoff**
Sugar Bowl (Semifinal)	January 1	Mercedes-Benz Superdome • New Orleans, LA	ESPN	8:00 p.m.	#3 **Ohio State**	#2 Clemson	**W** 49–28	3,000	
CFP National Championship	January 11	Hard Rock Stadium • Miami Gardens, FL	ESPN	8:00 p.m.	#3 **Ohio State**	#1 Alabama	**L** 24–52	14,926	

Rankings are from CFP rankings. All times Eastern Time Zone. Big Ten teams shown in bold.

== Big Ten records vs other conferences ==
2020–2021 records against non-conference foes:

Postseason

Power Conferences 5	Record
ACC	2-0
Big 12	0-0
Pac-12	0-0
BYU/Notre Dame	0-0
SEC	1-2
Power 5 Total	3-2
Other FBS Conferences	Record
American	0-0
C–USA	0-0
Independents (Excluding Notre Dame)	0-0
MAC	0-0
Mountain West	0-0
Sun Belt	0-0
Other FBS Total	0-0
Total Bowl Record	3-2

== Awards and honors ==
=== Player of the week honors ===
Week	Offensive			Defensive			Special Teams			Freshman		
Week	Player	Position	Team	Player	Position	Team	Player	Position	Team	Player	Position	Team
Week 1 (Oct. 23)	David Bell	WR	PUR	Jamar Johnson	S	IU	Charlie Kuhbander	PK	NW	Graham Mertz	QB	WIS
Week 1 (Oct. 23)	Graham Mertz	QB	WIS	Olakunle Fatukasi	LB	RUT	Charlie Kuhbander	PK	NW	Graham Mertz	QB	WIS
Week 2 (Nov. 2)	Taulia Tagovailoa	QB	MD	Tommy Togiai	DT	OSU	Charles Campbell	PK	IU	Ricky White	WR	MSU
Week 2 (Nov. 2)	Justin Fields	QB	OSU	Tommy Togiai	DT	OSU	Charles Campbell	PK	IU	Brandon Joseph	S	NW
Week 3 (Nov. 9)	Mohamed Ibrahim	RB	MIN	Chris Bergin	LB	NW	Charlie Jones	WR/PR	IA	Rakim Jarrett	WR	MD
Week 4 (Nov. 16)	Ty Fryfogle	WR	IU	Zach VanValkenburg	DE	IA	James McCourt	K	ILL	Isaiah Williams	QB	ILL
Week 5 (Nov. 23)	Ty Fryfogle	WR	IU	Blake Gallagher	LB	NW	Giles Jackson	KR	MICH	Brandon Joseph	S	NW
Week 6 (Nov. 30)	Stevie Scott III	RB	IU	Antjuan Simmons	LB	MSU	Keith Duncan	K	IA	Keyvone Lee	RB	PSU
Week 6 (Nov. 30)	Stevie Scott III	RB	IU	Antjuan Simmons	LB	MSU	Matt Coghlin	K	MSU	Keyvone Lee	RB	PSU
Week 7 (Dec. 7)	Justin Fields	QB	OSU	Micah McFadden	LB	IU	Haydon Whitehead	P	IU	Joey Porter Jr.	CB	PSU
Week 7 (Dec. 7)	Justin Fields	QB	OSU	Micah McFadden	LB	IU	Drue Chrisman	P	OSU	Joey Porter Jr.	CB	PSU
Week 8 (Dec. 14)	Ihmir Smith-Marsette	WR	IA	Mariano Sori-Marin	LB	MIN	Jahan Dotson	PR	PSU	Cam Porter	RB	NW

=== Big Ten Individual Awards ===
The following individuals won the conference's annual player and coach awards:

Award	Player	School
Graham-George Offensive Player of the Year	Justin Fields	Ohio State
Griese-Brees Quarterback of the Year	Justin Fields	Ohio State
Richter-Howard Receiver of the Year	Ty Fryfogle	Indiana
Ameche-Dayne Running Back of the Year	Mohamed Ibrahim	Minnesota
Kwalick-Clark Tight End of the Year	Pat Freiermuth	Penn State
Rimington-Pace Offensive Lineman of the Year	Wyatt Davis	Ohio State
Nagurski-Wooden Defensive Player of the Year	Daviyon Nixon	Iowa
Smith-Brown Defensive Lineman of the Year	Daviyon Nixon	Iowa
Butkus-Fitzgerald Linebacker of the Year	Paddy Fisher	Northwestern
Tatum-Woodson Defensive Back of the Year	Shaun Wade	Ohio State
Thompson-Randle El Freshman of the Year	Brandon Joseph	Northwestern
Bakken-Andersen Kicker of the Year	Connor Culp	Nebraska
Eddleman-Fields Punter of the Year	Tory Taylor	Iowa
Rodgers-Dwight Return Specialist of the Year	Aron Cruickshank	Rutgers
Hayes-Schembechler Coach of the Year (Coaches)	Tom Allen	Indiana
Dave McClain Coach of the Year (Media)	Tom Allen	Indiana
Dungy-Thompson Humanitarian Award	Vincent Smith	Michigan
Ford-Kinnick Leadership Award	Napoleon Haris	Northwestern

=== All-Conference Teams ===
2020 Big Ten All-Conference Teams and Awards

Position	Player	Team
First Team Offense (Coaches)
QB	Justin Fields	Ohio State
RB	Tyler Goodson	Iowa
RB	Mohamed Ibrahim	Minnesota
WR	Chris Olave	Ohio State
WR	Garrett Wilson	Ohio State
TE	Pat Freiermuth	Penn State
C	Josh Myers	Ohio State
OG	Kendrick Green	Illinois
OG	Wyatt Davis	Ohio State
OT	Thayer Munford	Ohio State
OT	Alaric Jackson	Iowa
OT	Cole Van Lanen	Wisconsin
First Team Defense (Coaches)
DL	Chauncey Golston	Iowa
DL	Daviyon Nixon	Iowa
DL	Odafe Oweh	Penn State
DL	Shaka Toney	Penn State
LB	Micah McFadden	Indiana
LB	Paddy Fisher	Northwestern
LB	Pete Werner	Ohio State
DB	Shakur Brown	Michigan State
DB	Brandon Joseph	Northwestern
DB	Greg Newsome II	Northwestern
DB	Shaun Wade	Ohio State
DB	–	–
First Team Special Teams (Coaches)
PK	Connor Culp	Nebraska
P	Tory Taylor	Iowa
RS	Aron Cruickshank	Rutgers

Position	Player	Team
Second Team Offense (Coaches)
QB	Michael Penix Jr.	Indiana
RB	Stevie Scott III	Indiana
RB	Master Teague	Ohio State
WR	Ty Fryfogle	Indiana
WR	David Bell	Purdue
TE	Jake Ferguson	Wisconsin
C	Tyler Linderbaum	Iowa
OG	Cole Banwart	Iowa
OG	Mike Miranda	Penn State
OT	Nicholas Petit-Frere	Ohio State
OT	Will Fries	Penn State
OT	–	–
Second Team Defense (Coaches)
DL	Owen Carney	Illinois
DL	Jerome Johnson	Indiana
DL	Zach VanValkenburg	Iowa
DL	Zach Harrison	Ohio State
DL	Tommy Togiai	Ohio State
DL	George Karlaftis	Purdue
LB	Blake Gallagher	Northwestern
LB	Derrick Barnes	Purdue
LB	Olakunle Fatukasi	Rutgers
DB	Jamar Johnson	Indiana
DB	Tiawan Mullen	Indiana
DB	Jaylin Williams	Indiana
DB	Cam Taylor-Britt	Nebraska
DB	–	–
Second Team Special Teams (Coaches)
PK	Charles Campbell	Indiana
P	Drue Chrisman	Ohio State
RS	Charlie Jones	Iowa

Position	Player	Team
Third Team Offense (Coaches)
QB	Peyton Ramsey	Northwestern
RB	Jake Funk	Maryland
RB	Zander Horvath	Purdue
WR	Rashod Bateman	Minnesota
WR	Jahan Dotson	Penn State
TE	Peyton Hendershot	Indiana
C	Michal Menet	Penn State
OG	Harry Miller	Ohio State
OG	Logan Bruss	Wisconsin
OT	Peter Skoronski	Northwestern
OT	–	–
OT	–	–
Third Team Defense (Coaches)
DL	Haskell Garrett	Ohio State
DL	Jonathon Cooper	Ohio State
DL	–	–
DL	–	–
DL	–	–
DL	–	–
LB	Jake Hansen	Illinois
LB	Antjuan Simmons	Michigan State
LB	Baron Browning	Ohio State
DB	Devon Matthews	Indiana
DB	Jack Koerner	Iowa
DB	Jaquan Brisker	Penn State
DB	Tre Avery	Rutgers
DB	Caesar Williams	Wisconsin
Third Team Special Teams (Coaches)
PK	Keith Duncan	Iowa
P	Adam Korsak	Rutgers
RS	Giles Jackson	Michigan

Coaches Honorable Mention: ILLINOIS: Chase Brown, Mike Epstein, Blake Hayes, Doug Kramer, Vederian Lowe, James McCourt, Roderick Perry II; INDIANA: Harry Crider, Cam Jones, Whop Philyor, Reese Taylor, Haydon Whitehead; IOWA: Dane Belton, Riley Moss, Mekhi Sargent, Ihmir Smith-Marsette, Cody Ince, Kyler Schott, Sam LaPorta; MARYLAND: Chance Campbell, Nick Cross, Jaelyn Duncan, Mo Kite, Tarheeb Still; MICHIGAN: Hassan Haskins, Daxton Hill, Carlo Kemp, Kwity Paye, Brad Robbins, Andrew Stueber; MICHIGAN STATE: Drew Beesley, Matt Coghlin; MINNESOTA: Coney Durr, Boye Mafe, Tanner Morgan, John Michael Schmitz, Conner Olson, Blaise Andries, Sam Schlueter; NEBRASKA: Marquel Dismuke, JoJo Domann, Matt Farniok, Will Honas, Brenden Jaimes, Wan'Dale Robinson, Ben Stille, Deontai Williams; NORTHWESTERN: Derek Adams, Chris Bergin, Earnest Brown IV, Charlie Kuhbander, Eku Leota, John Raine; OHIO STATE: Sevyn Banks, Tuf Borland, Luke Farrell, Marcus Hooker, Josh Proctor, Jeremy Ruckert, Trey Sermon, Tyreke Smith, Marcus Williamson; PENN STATE: Tariq Castro-Fields, Jahan Dotson, P. J. Mustipher, Joey Porter Jr., Antonio Shelton, Brandon Smith, Lamont Wade, Rasheed Walker; PURDUE: Jaylan Alexander, Cam Allen, J.D. Dellinger, Payne Durham, Gus Hartwig, Grant Hermanns, Spencer Holstege, Lorenzo Neal, Rondale Moore; RUTGERS: Michael Dwumfour, Christian Izien, Bo Melton, Reggie Sutton, Julius Turner, Mike Tverdov, Brendon White; WISCONSIN: Tyler Beach, Eric Burrell, Leo Chenal, Faion Hicks, Isaiahh Loudermilk, Jack Sanborn, Mason Stokke, Andy Vujnovich.

Position	Player	Team
First Team Offense (Media)
QB	Justin Fields	Ohio State
RB	Tyler Goodson	Iowa
RB	Mohamed Ibrahim	Minnesota
WR	Ty Fryfogle	Indiana
WR	David Bell	Purdue
TE	Jake Ferguson	Wisconsin
C	Tyler Linderbaum	Iowa
OG	Kendrick Green	Illinois
OG	Wyatt Davis	Ohio State
OT	Thayer Munford	Ohio State
OT	Alaric Jackson	Iowa
First Team Defense (Media)
DL	Jerome Johnson	Indiana
DL	Chauncey Golston	Iowa
DL	Daviyon Nixon	Iowa
DL	Shaka Toney	Penn State
DL	–	–
LB	Micah McFadden	Indiana
LB	Paddy Fisher	Northwestern
LB	Olakunle Fatukasi	Rutgers
DB	Jamar Johnson	Indiana
DB	Tiawan Mullen	Indiana
DB	Brandon Joseph	Northwestern
DB	Greg Newsome II	Northwestern
DB	Shaun Wade	Ohio State
First Team Special Teams (Media)
PK	Connor Culp	Nebraska
P	Tory Taylor	Iowa
RS	Aron Cruickshank	Rutgers

Position	Player	Team
Second Team Offense (Media)
QB	Michael Penix Jr.	Indiana
RB	Stevie Scott III	Indiana
RB	Master Teague	Ohio State
WR	Chris Olave	Ohio State
WR	Garrett Wilson	Ohio State
TE	Pat Freiermuth	Penn State
C	Josh Myers	Ohio State
OG	Cole Banwart	Iowa
OG	Mike Miranda	Penn State
OT	Peter Skoronski	Northwestern
OT	Cole Van Lanen	Wisconsin
Second Team Defense (Media)
DL	Owen Carney	Illinois
DL	Zach VanValkenburg	Iowa
DL	Kwity Paye	Michigan
DL	Tommy Togiai	Ohio State
DL	Odafe Oweh	Penn State
LB	Jake Hansen	Illinois
LB	Antjuan Simmons	Michigan State
LB	Blake Gallagher	Northwestern
DB	Jaylin Williams	Indiana
DB	Jack Koerner	Iowa
DB	Shakur Brown	Michigan State
DB	–	–
DB	–	–
Second Team Special Teams (Media)
PK	Charles Campbell	Indiana
P	Adam Korsak	Rutgers
RS	Giles Jackson	Michigan

Position	Player	Team
Third Team Offense (Media)
QB	Peyton Ramsey	Northwestern
RB	Chase Brown	Illinois
RB	Zander Horvath	Purdue
WR	Rashod Bateman	Minnesota
WR	Jahan Dotson	Penn State
TE	Peyton Hendershot	Indiana
C	Michal Menet	Penn State
OG	Conner Olson	Minnesota
OG	Logan Bruss	Wisconsin
OT	Blaise Andries	Minnesota
OT	Rasheed Walker	Penn State
Third Team Defense (Media)
DL	Eku Leota	Northwestern
DL	Jonathon Cooper	Ohio State
DL	Isaiahh Loudermilk	Wisconsin
DL	–	–
DL	–	–
LB	Pete Werner	Ohio State
LB	Derrick Barnes	Purdue
LB	Jack Sanborn	Wisconsin
DB	Devon Matthews	Indiana
DB	Joey Porter Jr.	Penn State
DB	Lamont Wade	Penn State
DB	Tre Avery	Rutgers
DB	–	–
Third Team Special Teams (Media)
PK	Keith Duncan	Iowa
P	Blake Hayes	Illinois
RS	Charlie Jones	Iowa

Media Honorable Mention: ILLINOIS: Mike Epstein, Doug Kramer, Vederian Lowe, James McCourt, Roderick Perry II; INDIANA: Harry Crider, Cam Jones, Whop Philyor, Reese Taylor, Haydon Whitehead; IOWA: Dane Belton, Seth Benson, Shaun Beyer, Matt Hankins, Cody Ince, Mark Kallenberger, Sam LaPorta, Riley Moss, Nick Niemann, Spencer Petras, Mekhi Sargent, Ihmir Smith-Marsette, Kyler Schott; MARYLAND: Chance Campbell, Nick Cross, Dontay Demus, Jaelyn Duncan, Jake Funk, Rakim Jarrett, Johnny Jordan, Mo Kite, Tarheeb Still, Taulia Tagovailoa; MICHIGAN: Michael Barrett, Hassan Haskins, Brad Hawkins, Daxton Hill, Brad Robbins; MICHIGAN STATE: Drew Beesley, Matt Coghlin, Jayden Reed; MINNESOTA: Coney Durr, Boye Mafe, Tanner Morgan, Sam Schlueter, John Michael Schmitz; NEBRASKA: Dicaprio Bootle, Marquel Dismuke, JoJo Domann, Matt Farniok, Will Honas, Brenden Jaimes, Ben Stille, Cam Taylor-Britt, Deontai Williams; NORTHWESTERN: Derek Adams, Chris Bergin, Earnest Brown IV, Ramaud Chiaokhiao-Bowman, Charlie Kuhbander, JR Pace, John Raine; OHIO STATE: Sevyn Banks, Tuf Borland, Baron Browning, Drue Chrisman, Zach Harrison, Haskell Garrett, Marcus Hooker, Harry Miller, Nicholas Petit-Frere, Trey Sermon, Tyreke Smith; PENN STATE: Jaquan Brisker, Tariq Castro-Fields, Jahan Dotson, Will Fries, P. J. Mustipher, Antonio Shelton, Brandon Smith; PURDUE: Cam Allen, J.D. Dellinger, Gus Hartwig, Grant Hermanns, Spencer Holstege, George Karlaftis, Greg Long, Lorenzo Neal, Rondale Moore, Brennan Thieneman; RUTGERS: Michael Dwumfour, Tyshon Fogg, Christian Izien, Bo Melton, Raiqwon O'Neil, Julius Turner, Mike Tverdov, Avery Young; WISCONSIN: Eric Burrell, Leo Chenal, Faion Hicks, Caesar Williams.

=== All-Americans ===
The 2020 College Football All-America Team is composed of the following College Football All-American first teams chosen by the following selector organizations: Associated Press (AP), Football Writers Association of America (FWAA), American Football Coaches Association (AFCA), Walter Camp Foundation (WCFF), The Sporting News (TSN), Sports Illustrated (SI), USA Today (USAT) ESPN, CBS Sports (CBS), FOX Sports (FOX) College Football News (CFN), Bleacher Report (BR), Scout.com, Phil Steele (PS), SB Nation (SB), Athlon Sports, Pro Football Focus (PFF), The Athletic, and Yahoo! Sports (Yahoo!).

Currently, the NCAA compiles consensus all-America teams in the sports of Division I-FBS football and Division I men's basketball using a point system computed from All-America teams named by coaches associations or media sources. The system consists of three points for a first-team honor, two points for second-team honor, and one point for third-team honor. Honorable mention and fourth team or lower recognitions are not accorded any points. Football consensus teams are compiled by position and the player accumulating the most points at each position is named first team consensus all-American. Currently, the NCAA recognizes All-Americans selected by the AP, AFCA, FWAA, TSN, and the WCFF to determine Consensus and Unanimous All-Americans. Any player named to the First Team by all five of the NCAA-recognized selectors is deemed a Unanimous All-American.

Position	Player	School	Selector	Unanimous	Consensus
First Team All-Americans
C	Tyler Linderbaum	Iowa	Athletic, USAT		
OG	Wyatt Davis	Ohio State	AFCA, AP, ESPN, FWAA, PS, TSN, WCFF	*	*
DL	Haskell Garrett	Ohio State	CBS		
DL	Daviyon Nixon	Iowa	AFCA, AP, Athletic, ESPN, FWAA, PS, TSN, WCFF, USAT	*	*
CB	Greg Newsome II	Northwestern	Athletic		
CB	Shaun Wade	Ohio State	AFCA, AP, ESPN, TSN		*
S	Brandon Joseph	Northwestern	AFCA, AP, CBS, TSN, WCFF, USAT		*
DB	Tiawan Mullen	Indiana	FWAA, PS		

Position	Player	School	Selector
Second Team All-Americans
WR	Chris Olave	Ohio State	Athletic, PS
WR	Garrett Wilson	Ohio State	FWAA
C	Tyler Linderbaum	Iowa	AP, CBS, FWAA, PS, WCFF
C	Josh Myers	Ohio State	TSN
OG	Wyatt Davis	Ohio State	CBS, USAT
OG	Kendrick Green	Illinois	USAT
OT	Alaric Jackson	Iowa	AFCA
DL	Jonathon Cooper	Ohio State	AFCA
DL	Daviyon Nixon	Iowa	CBS
DT	Haskell Garrett	Ohio State	AP, Athletic, TSN, WCFF
LB	Paddy Fisher	Northwestern	AFCA, CBS
LB	Micah McFadden	Indiana	PS
CB	Tiawan Mullen	Indiana	Athletic
CB	Greg Newsome II	Northwestern	FWAA, PS, USAT
CB	Shaun Wade	Ohio State	CBS, FWAA, PS, WCFF
S	Jaquan Brisker	Penn State	CBS
CB	Brandon Joseph	Northwestern	Athletic
DB	Shakur Brown	Michigan State	WCFF
P	Tory Taylor	Iowa	Athletic

Position	Player	School	Selector
Third Team All-Americans
RB	Mohamed Ibrahim	Minnesota	AP
RB	Trey Sermon	Ohio State	PS
WR	Ty Fryfogle	Indiana	AP
WR	Garrett Wilson	Ohio State	PS
OL	Alaric Jackson	Iowa	PS
DL	Haskell Garrett	Ohio State	PS
LB	Micah McFadden	Indiana	AP
LB	Blake Gallagher	Northwestern	PS
CB	Greg Newsome II	Northwestern	AP
CB	Brandon Joseph	Northwestern	PS

Position	Player	School	Selector
Fourth Team All-Americans
QB	Justin Fields	Ohio State	PS
RB	Mohamed Ibrahim	Minnesota	PS
WR	Ty Fryfogle	Indiana	PS
OL	Josh Myers	Ohio State	PS
LB	Paddy Fisher	Northwestern	PS

*Associated Press All-America Team (AP)
*CBS Sports All-America Team (CBS)
*ESPN Sports All-America Team (ESPN)
*The Athletic All-America Team (Athletic)
*USA Today All-America Team (USAT)
*The Sporting News All-America Team (TSN)
*Football Writers Association of America All-America Team (FWAA)
*American Football Coaches Association All-America Team (AFCA)
*Phil Steele All-America Team (PS)
*Walter Camp Football Foundation All-America Team (WCFF)

== Home attendance ==
Due to COVID-19, the Big Ten is not allowing fans into stadiums for the 2020 season. Family members and limited staff are permitted. Some schools count and track those numbers and some do not.

Team	Stadium	Capacity	Game 1	Game 2	Game 3	Game 4	Game 5	Total	Average	% of Capacity
Illinois	Memorial Stadium	60,670	838	863	(Canceled)	875	2,576	859	1.4%	
Indiana	Memorial Stadium	52,656	995	1,034	963	(Canceled)	–	2,992	997	1.9%
Iowa	Kinnick Stadium	69,250	1,432	1,441	1,469	1,445	–	5,787	1,447	2.1%
Maryland	Maryland Stadium	51,802	0	(Canceled)	(Canceled)	0	–	0	0	0.0%
Michigan	Michigan Stadium	107,601	615	605	0	(Canceled)	–	1,220	407	0.4%
Michigan State	Spartan Stadium	75,005	376	340	0	0	–	716	179	0.2%
Minnesota	TCF Bank Stadium	50,805	589	771	593	(Canceled)	–	1,953	651	1.3%
Nebraska	Memorial Stadium	85,458	(Canceled)	0	0	0	–	0	0	0.0%
Northwestern	Ryan Field	47,130	0	0	0	0	–	0	0	0.0%
Ohio State	Ohio Stadium	102,780	1,344	1,275	635	(Canceled)	–	3,254	1,085	1.1%
Penn State	Beaver Stadium	106,572	1,500	1,500	1,500	0	0	4,500	900	0.8%
Purdue	Ross–Ade Stadium	57,236	900	886	728	808	–	3,322	831	1.5%
Rutgers	SHI Stadium	52,454	0	0	0	0	0	0	0	0.0%
Wisconsin	Camp Randall Stadium	80,321	0	(Canceled)	(Canceled)	0	0	0	0	0.0%

== 2021 NFL draft ==
The Big Ten had 44 players selected in the 2021 NFL Draft, the second-most of any conference, trailing only the SEC who had 65.

Team	Round 1	Round 2	Round 3	Round 4	Round 5	Round 6	Round 7	Total
Illinois	–	–	1	–	1	–	–	2
Indiana	–	–	–	–	1	–	–	1
Iowa	–	–	1	–	2	1	–	4
Maryland	–	–	–	–	–	–	1	1
Michigan	1	–	3	–	2	2	–	8
Michigan State	–	–	–	–	–	–	–	–
Minnesota	1	–	1	–	–	–	–	2
Nebraska	–	–	–	–	1	–	1	2
Northwestern	2	–	–	–	1	–	–	3
Ohio State	1	2	3	1	2	–	1	10
Penn State	2	1	–	–	–	–	3	6
Purdue	–	1	–	1	–	–	–	2
Rutgers	–	–	–	–	–	–	–	–
Wisconsin	–	–	–	–	1	2	–	3

*	compensatory selection
×	2020 Resolution JC-2A selection

Rnd.	Pick	Team	Player	Pos.	College	Notes
1	11	Chicago Bears	Justin Fields	QB	Ohio State	from N.Y. Giants (Note: No. 11: NY Giants → Chicago (D). NY Giants traded its first-round selection (11th overall) to Chicago in exchange for first- and fifth-round selections (20th and 164th overall), alongside their first and fourth-round selections in 2022.)
1	12	Dallas Cowboys	Micah Parsons	LB	Penn State	from San Francisco via Miami and Philadelphia (Note: Multiple trades: No. 12: San Francisco → Miami (PD). See No. 3: Miami → San Francisco. No. 6: Philadelphia → Miami (PD).No. 12: Miami → Philadelphia (PD). See No. 12: Philadelphia → Dallas (D). See No. 10: Dallas → Philadelphia.)
1	13	Los Angeles Chargers	Rashawn Slater	T	Northwestern	
1	21	Indianapolis Colts	Kwity Paye	DE	Michigan	
1	26	Cleveland Browns	Greg Newsome II	CB	Northwestern	
1	27	Baltimore Ravens	Rashod Bateman	WR	Minnesota	
1	31	Baltimore Ravens	Odafe Oweh	DE	Penn State	from Kansas City (Note: No. 31: Kansas City → Baltimore (PD). Kansas City traded a first, third, and fourth-round selection (31st, 94th, and 136th overall) and a 2022 fifth-round selection to Baltimore in exchange for a second-round selection (58th overall), a 2022 sixth-round selection, and offensive tackle Orlando Brown Jr.)
2	49	Arizona Cardinals	Rondale Moore	WR	Purdue	
2	55	Pittsburgh Steelers	Pat Freiermuth	TE	Penn State	
2	60	New Orleans Saints	Pete Werner	LB	Ohio State	
2	62	Green Bay Packers	Josh Myers	C	Ohio State	
3	68	Atlanta Falcons	Jalen Mayfield	T	Michigan	
3	74	Washington Football Team	Benjamin St-Juste	CB	Minnesota	from San Francisco (Note: No. 74: San Francisco → Washington (PD). San Francisco traded third-round and 2020 fifth-round selections to Washington in exchange for offensive tackle Trent Williams.)
3	84	Dallas Cowboys	Chauncey Golston	DE	Iowa	from Indianapolis via Philadelphia (Note: Multiple trades: No. 84: Indianapolis → Philadelphia (PD). Indianapolis traded a third-round selection and a 2022 conditional second-round selection, which could go up to the first round, to Philadelphia in exchange for quarterback Carson Wentz. No. 84: Philadelphia → Dallas (D). See No. 10: Dallas → Philadelphia.)
3	86	Minnesota Vikings	Wyatt Davis	G	Ohio State	from Seattle via N.Y. Jets (Note: Multiple trades: No. 86: Seattle → N.Y. Jets (PD). See No. 23: Seattle → N.Y. Jets. No. 86: N.Y. Jets → Minnesota (D). See No. 14: Minnesota → N.Y. Jets.)
3	87	Pittsburgh Steelers	Kendrick Green	G	Illinois	
3	88	San Francisco 49ers	Trey Sermon	RB	Ohio State	from L.A. Rams (Note: No. 88: L.A. Rams → San Francisco (D). The L.A. Rams traded a third-round selection (88th overall) to San Francisco in exchange for two fourth-round selections (117th and 121st overall).)
3	89	Houston Texans	Nico Collins	WR	Michigan	from Cleveland via Carolina (Note: Multiple trades: No. 89: Cleveland → Carolina (D). See No. 52: Carolina → Cleveland. No. 89: Carolina → Houston (D). Carolina traded a third-round selection (89th overall) to Houston in exchange for fourth- and fifth-round selections (109th and 158th overall) and a 2022 fourth-round selection.)
3×	102	San Francisco 49ers	Ambry Thomas	CB	Michigan	2020 Resolution JC-2A selection (Note: San Francisco received 2021, 2022, and 2023 third-round selections when its defensive coordinator Robert Saleh was hired by the New York Jets as head coach and its vice president of player personnel Martin Mayhew was hired by Washington as general manager.)
3×	105	Denver Broncos	Baron Browning	LB	Ohio State	2020 Resolution JC-2A selection (Note: New Orleans received 2021 and 2022 third-round selections when its director of pro scouting Terry Fontenot was hired by Atlanta as general manager.) via New Orleans
4	113	Detroit Lions	Derrick Barnes	LB	Purdue	from Carolina via Cleveland (Note: No. 113: Carolina → Cleveland (D). See No. 52: Carolina → Cleveland.)
4	132	Cleveland Browns	Tommy Togiai	T	Ohio State	
5	145	Jacksonville Jaguars	Luke Farrell	TE	Ohio State	
5	156	Pittsburgh Steelers	Isaiahh Loudermilk	DT	Wisconsin	from Dallas via Philadelphia, (Note: Multiple trades: No. 156: Dallas → Philadelphia (PD). Dallas traded 2020 and 2021 fifth-round selections to Philadelphia in exchange for a 2020 fourth-round selection. No. 156: Philadelphia → Miami (PD). See No. 6: Philadelphia → Miami.) Miami, and Philadelphia
5	157	Minnesota Vikings	Ihmir Smith-Marsette	WR	Iowa	
5	158	Carolina Panthers	Daviyon Nixon	DT	Iowa	from New England via Houston (Note: Multiple trades: No. 158: New England → Houston (PD). See No. 122: Houston → New England. No. 158: Houston → Carolina (D). See No. 89: Carolina → Houston.)
5	159	Los Angeles Chargers	Brenden Jaimes	T	Nebraska	
5	160	Baltimore Ravens	Shaun Wade	CB	Ohio State	from Arizona
5	164	Denver Broncos	Jamar Johnson	S	Indiana	from Chicago via N.Y. Giants (Note: Multiple trades: No. 164: Chicago → N.Y. Giants (D). See No. 11: N.Y. Giants → Chicago. No. 164: N.Y. Giants → Denver (D). See No. 71: Denver → N.Y. Giants.)
5	167	Las Vegas Raiders	Nate Hobbs	CB	Illinois	from Seattle (Note: No. 167: Seattle → Las Vegas (PD). Seattle traded a fifth-round selection to Las Vegas in exchange for offensive guard Gabe Jackson.)
5	174	Los Angeles Rams	Earnest Brown IV	DE	Northwestern	from Buffalo via Houston
5*	177	New England Patriots	Cameron McGrone	LB	Michigan	33rd compensatory selection (Note: The NFL originally announced 32 compensatory selections. On March 19, it released a revised list of 33 selections. After correcting an error in the original calculation, the Patriots earned an additional fifth-round compensatory selection. The NFL Management Council and NFLPA agreed to add an extra compensatory selection instead of removing a previously awarded one.)
5*	184	Baltimore Ravens	Ben Mason	FB	Michigan	
6	185	Los Angeles Chargers	Nick Niemann	LB	Iowa	from Jacksonville via Tennessee (Note: Multiple trades: No. 185: Jacksonville → Tennessee (PD). Jacksonville traded a sixth-round selection to Tennessee in exchange for a seventh-round selection and linebacker Kamalei Correa. No. 185: Tennessee → L.A. Chargers (PD). Tennessee traded Jacksonville's six-round selection to the Los Angeles Chargers in exchange for cornerback Desmond King.)
6	202	Cincinnati Bengals	Chris Evans	RB	Michigan	from Miami via Houston (Note: Multiple trades: No. 202: Miami → Houston (PD). See No. 3: Houston → Miami. No. 202: Houston → Cincinnati (PD). Houston traded Miami's sixth-round pick in exchange for a seventh-round selection and quarterback Ryan Finley.)
6	213	Buffalo Bills	Rachad Wildgoose	CB	Wisconsin	
6	214	Green Bay Packers	Cole Van Lanen	G	Wisconsin	
6*	225	Washington Football Team	Camaron Cheeseman	LS	Michigan	from Philadelphia
7	233	Los Angeles Rams	Jake Funk	RB	Maryland	from Cincinnati via Houston (Note: No. 233: Cincinnati → Houston. See No. 202: Houston → Cincinnati.)
7	238	Dallas Cowboys	Matt Farniok	G	Nebraska	
7	239	Denver Broncos	Jonathon Cooper	DE	Ohio State	from N.Y. Giants (Note: No. 239: N.Y. Giants → Denver (PD). The New York Giants traded a seventh-round selection to Denver in exchange for cornerback Isaac Yiadom.)
7	246	Washington Football Team	Shaka Toney	DE	Penn State	
7	247	Arizona Cardinals	Michal Menet	C	Penn State	from Chicago via Las Vegas (Note: Multiple trades: No. 247: Chicago → Las Vegas (PD). Chicago traded a conditional seventh-round selection to Las Vegas, based in Oakland at the time of trade, in exchange for kicker Eddy Piñeiro. No. 247: Las Vegas → Arizona (PD). See No. 79: Arizona → Las Vegas.)
7	248	Indianapolis Colts	Will Fries	G	Penn State	

Draft Notes

== Head coaches ==
Current through January 11, 2021

Team	Head coach	Years at school	Overall record	Record at school	B1G record
Illinois	Lovie Smith*	5	17–39 (.304)	17–39 (.304)	10–33 (.233)
Illinois	Rod Smith*	1	0–1 (.000)	0–1 (.000)	0–1 (.000)
Indiana	Tom Allen*	4	24–22 (.522)	24–22 (.522)	15–19 (.441)
Iowa	Kirk Ferentz	22	180–127 (.586)	168–106 (.613)	103–77 (.572)
Maryland	Mike Locksley*	2	8–43 (.157)	6–17 (.261)	4–16 (.200)
Michigan	Jim Harbaugh	6	107–49 (.686)	49–22 (.690)	34–16 (.680)
Michigan State	Mel Tucker	1	7–12 (.368)	2–5 (.286)	2–5 (.286)
Minnesota	P. J. Fleck	4	56–41 (.577)	26–19 (.578)	15–19 (.441)
Nebraska	Scott Frost	3	31–27 (.534)	12–20 (.375)	9–17 (.346)
Northwestern	Pat Fitzgerald	15	106–81 (.567)	106–81 (.567)	63–60 (.512)
Ohio State	Ryan Day*	2	23–2 (.920)	23–2 (.920)	15–0 (1.000)
Penn State	James Franklin	7	84–43 (.661)	60–28 (.682)	38–23 (.623)
Purdue	Jeff Brohm	4	49–35 (.583)	19–25 (.432)	14–19 (.424)
Rutgers	Greg Schiano*	12	71–73 (.493)	71–73 (.493)	3–6 (.333)
Wisconsin	Paul Chryst	6	75–38 (.664)	56–19 (.747)	37–13 (.740)

* Tom Allen was hired to replace Kevin Wilson in December 2016 at Indiana and coached the Hoosiers in their 2016 bowl game, going 0–1.

* Mike Locksley served as interim head coach at Maryland in 2015 and coached for six games, going 1–5.

* Ryan Day served as interim head coach at Ohio State for the first three games of the 2018 season while Urban Meyer served a three-game suspension and went 3–0.

* Greg Schiano served as head coach at Rutgers from 2001 through 2011 then left for the NFL. Following the conclusion of the 2019 season, Schiano returned to Rutgers for his second stint as head coach. The Scarlet Knights competed in the Big East Conference in his previous stay at the school.

* Lovie Smith was relieved of his coaching duties at Illinois on December 13. Offensive coordinator Rod Smith was named interim coach for the final game of the 2020 season.
