= Jaylin Williams (gridiron football) =

American football player (born 2000)

Profile
- Position: Cornerback

Personal information
- Born: February 26, 2000 (age 26); Clarksdale, Mississippi, U.S.
- Listed height: 5 ft 10 in (1.78 m)
- Listed weight: 195 lb (88 kg)

Career information
- High school: Germantown (Germantown, Tennessee)
- College: Indiana (2018–2022)
- NFL draft: 2023: undrafted

Career history
- Minnesota Vikings (2023–2024); BC Lions (2025)*; Edmonton Elks (2025)
- * Offseason or practice squad member only

Awards and highlights
- Second-team All-Big Ten (2020)

Career NFL statistics
- Total tackles: 1
- Stats at Pro Football Reference

Jaylin Williams (born February 26, 2000) is an American professional football cornerback/defensive back. He played college football for the Indiana Hoosiers.

== Early life ==
Williams was born in Mississippi on February 26, 2000, and raised by his mother, Roshunda. They then moved to Memphis, Tennessee, to live with his stepfather, Frederick, before moving to Texas, California, and back to Texas, where Williams began high school.

Williams spent his freshman and sophomore seasons at Centennial High School in Frisco, Texas, before returning to the Memphis area, where he attended Germantown High School in Germantown, Tennessee. In two seasons on the Germantown football team, he caught 92 passes for 1,968 yards and 22 touchdowns on offense, and tallied 132 tackles, seven interceptions, four forced fumbles, and 23 pass breakups on defense. As a senior, Williams was named a first-team all-state selection and the Class 6A All-Region Most Valuable Player after helping the Red Devils win their first regional title since 2003. He was selected to play in the 2017 East-West Tennessee All-Star Classic, where he recorded two tackles and three pass breakups.

Williams committed to play college football at the Indiana University over others schools such as Mississippi State, Ole Miss, Virginia, Wake Forest, and Washington State.

== College career ==
Williams recorded his first collegiate interception in week eleven of the 2018 season, as he helped Indiana beat Maryland 34–32. He finished the season with 22 tackles with one being for a loss, one sack, two pass deflections, and an interception. Williams intercepted a pass in the 2019 season opener, helping the Hoosiers beat Ball State 34–24. He finished the 2019 season with 19 tackles, three pass deflections, and an interception. Williams got off to a hot start to open the 2020 season, recording three interceptions in the first three weeks, as he helped the Hoosiers to three wins beating Penn State, Rutgers, and Michigan. Williams finished his breakout 2020 season with 30 tackles with two being for a loss, a sack, a pass deflection, and four interceptions. For his performance, Williams was named second-team all-Big Ten. In week ten of the 2021 season, Williams made three tackles and broke up three passes, but Indiana lost to Michigan 29–7. Williams finished the 2021 season with 41 tackles with one going for a loss, and 11 pass deflections. In week one of the 2022 season, Williams notched six tackles and a fumble recovery, as Indiana defeated Illinois 23–20. Williams finished the 2022 season with 40 tackles with 2.5 being for a loss, seven pass deflections, and a fumble recovery.

Williams finished his career at Indiana with, 152 tackles with 6,5 going for a loss, two sacks, 24 pass deflections, six interceptions, and a fumble recovery.

== Professional career ==
Pre-draft measurables
Height	Weight	Arm length	Hand span	40-yard dash	10-yard split	20-yard split	20-yard shuttle	Three-cone drill	Vertical jump	Broad jump	Bench press
5 ft 9 3/4 in (1.77 m)	184 lb (83 kg)	29 7/8 in (0.76 m)	9 1/8 in (0.23 m)	4.45 s	1.58 s	2.59 s	4.20 s	7.01 s	34.5 in (0.88 m)	9 ft 11 in (3.02 m)	13 reps
All values from Pro Day

=== Minnesota Vikings ===
After not being selected in the 2023 NFL draft, Williams signed with the Minnesota Vikings as an undrafted free agent. In his first career preseason game, he intercepted a pass off of Drew Lock in a defeat to the Seattle Seahawks. He was waived on August 29, 2023, and signed to the practice squad the next day. Following the end of the 2023 regular season, the Vikings signed him to a reserve/future contract on January 8, 2024.

Williams was waived by the Vikings on August 27, 2024, and re-signed to the practice squad. He was released on September 10.

=== BC Lions ===
On February 12, 2025, Williams signed as a defensive back with the BC Lions of the Canadian Football League (CFL). On June 1, 2025, Williams was assigned to the Lions' practice squad to start the 2025 CFL season. He was released on July 9, 2025.

=== Edmonton Elks ===
The Edmonton Elks announced on July 20, 2025 that they had signed Williams to their practice roster.

On May 31, 2026, Williams was released by the Elks as part of final roster cuts.
