= Zach VanValkenburg =

American football player (born 1998)

Profile
- Position: Linebacker

Personal information
- Born: February 17, 1998 (age 28); Zeeland, Michigan, U.S.
- Listed height: 6 ft 4 in (1.93 m)
- Listed weight: 260 lb (118 kg)

Career information
- High school: Zeeland West (MI)
- College: Hillsdale (2016–2018); Iowa (2019–2021)
- NFL draft: 2022: undrafted

Career history
- Las Vegas Raiders (2022)*; Los Angeles Rams (2022–2024)
- * Offseason or practice squad member only

Awards and highlights
- 2× All-Big Ten Conference (2020, 2021)

Career NFL statistics as of 2023
- Total tackles: 9
- Sacks: 1
- Stats at Pro Football Reference

Zach VanValkenburg (born February 17, 1998) is an American professional football linebacker. He played college football at Hillsdale before transferring to Iowa and was signed by the Las Vegas Raiders as an undrafted free agent in 2022.

== Early life ==
VanValkenburg was born on February 17, 1998, in Zeeland, Michigan. He attended Zeeland West High School, and was a three-year player at linebacker and defensive end. As a junior, he earned all-conference honors. As a senior, VanValkenburg was team captain and made 85 tackles, earning first-team all-state, all-conference, and Holland Sentinel Defensive Player of the Year honors, as well as being named to the Detroit Free Press Dream Team. In addition to playing football, VanValkenburg was also a four-year letterman in wrestling, earning all-state honors, and played four seasons on the track team.

== College career ==
VanValkenburg declined offers from Holy Cross and Air Force to commit to Hillsdale College. After suffering an injury early into his true freshman season, 2016, he decided to redshirt. As a second-year freshman in the 2017 season, VanValkenburg compiled a total of 32 tackles to go along with 4.5 sacks, one forced fumble, and a blocked kick. He earned Great Midwest Athletic Conference (G-MAC) Defensive Lineman of the Year honors in 2018, after posting 70 total tackles, including 14.5 for-loss, and 8.5 sacks along with three fumbles forced.

After receiving a degree in history following the 2018 season, VanValkenburg decided to transfer as a college graduate to Iowa for his final two years of football eligibility. He had previously "emailed every coach in the country" looking for places to transfer, but Iowa was one of only two schools to reply. He was not given a scholarship, and had to make the team as a walk-on. He spent the 2019 season as a backup to A. J. Epenesa and Chauncey Golston, both of whom went on to play in the National Football League (NFL). In the season, VanValkenburg recorded six tackles and appeared in a total of 11 games.

VanValkenburg was named as a backup to John Waggoner to start the 2020 season, but became a starter in the first week after an injury to the latter. He ended up starting all eight games in a season shortened by the COVID-19 pandemic, and made a total of 30 tackles, 8.5 for-loss, and 3.5 sacks. He also recorded four fumble recoveries, tying for first place nationally, and made one forced fumble. He was named at the end of the season a second-team All-Big Ten Conference selection by the coaches of the league and a fourth-team choice by Phil Steele.

Although 2020 was supposed to be VanValkenburg's final season of collegiate football, he was given an extra year of eligibility due to COVID-19 and opted to return to the team in 2021. He started all 14 games that year and recorded 58 total tackles along with 5.5 sacks and 15 tackles-for-loss. He was given the Hayden Fry Award for defensive most valuable player and was named second-team all-conference by the league's coaches and Associated Press (AP). Phil Steele named him a third-team selection, and VanValkenburg additionally was a quarterfinalist for the Lott Trophy.

VanValkenburg finished his six-year college career with a total of 60 games played (48 as a starter), and 211 tackles, 42.5 for-loss, 22 sacks, and five forced fumbles. He graduated with a master's degree in Eastern European Studies.

== Professional career ==
Pre-draft measurables
Height	Weight	Arm length	Hand span	40-yard dash	10-yard split	20-yard split	20-yard shuttle	Three-cone drill	Vertical jump	Broad jump	Bench press
6 ft 4 1/2 in (1.94 m)	263 lb (119 kg)	31 3/8 in (0.80 m)	10 1/8 in (0.26 m)	4.97 s	1.74 s	2.78 s	4.41 s	7.03 s	31.5 in (0.80 m)	9 ft 5 in (2.87 m)	22 reps
All values from Iowa's Pro Day

=== Las Vegas Raiders ===
After going unselected in the 2022 NFL draft, VanValkenburg was signed by the Las Vegas Raiders as an undrafted free agent. He was waived at the final roster cuts, on August 30, and was subsequently signed to the practice squad. He was released from the practice squad on September 6.

=== Los Angeles Rams ===
On September 20, 2022, VanValkenburg was signed to the practice squad of the Los Angeles Rams. He signed a reserve/futures contract on January 9, 2023. He made the final roster in 2023 and made his NFL debut in week one against the Seattle Seahawks. He was waived on November 14, 2023, and re-signed to the practice squad. He signed a reserve/future contract on January 15, 2024.

VanValkenburg was waived by the Rams on August 27, 2024, and re-signed to the practice squad. He was released on October 25.
