= Kendrick Green =

American football player (born 1998)

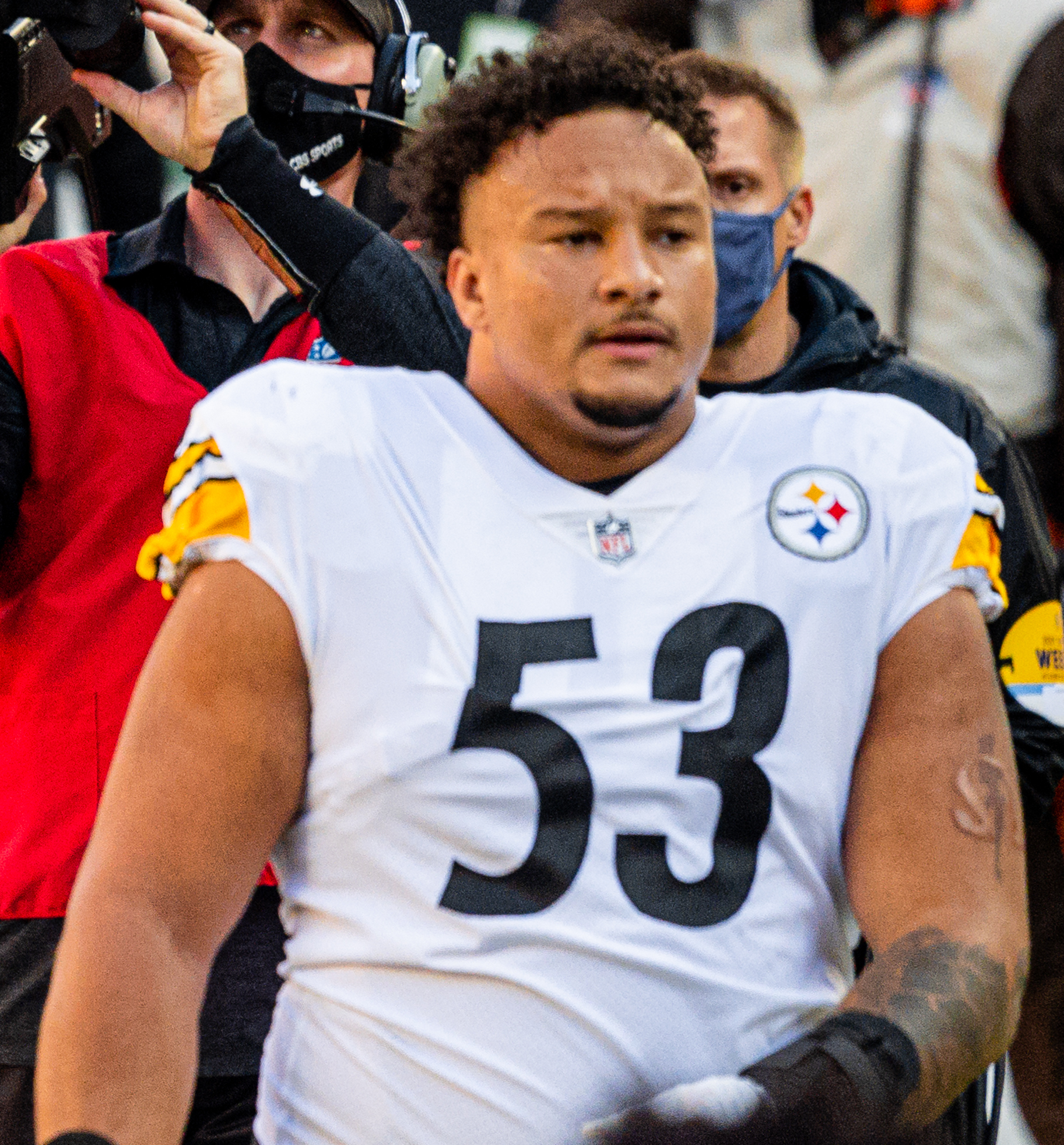
- Green with the Pittsburgh Steelers in 2021

No. 53 – New York Giants
- Position: Center
- Roster status: Practice squad

Personal information
- Born: December 22, 1998 (age 27); Peoria, Illinois, U.S.
- Listed height: 6 ft 4 in (1.93 m)
- Listed weight: 315 lb (143 kg)

Career information
- High school: Peoria
- College: Illinois (2017–2020)
- NFL draft: 2021: 3rd round, 87th overall pick

Career history
- Pittsburgh Steelers (2021–2022); Houston Texans (2023–2024); Buffalo Bills (2025)*; Cleveland Browns (2025–2026); New York Giants (2026–present)*
- * Offseason or practice squad member only

Awards and highlights
- First-team All-Big Ten (2020)

Career NFL statistics
- Games played: 37
- Games started: 19
- Stats at Pro Football Reference

Kendrick Green (born December 22, 1998) is an American professional football center for the New York Giants of the National Football League (NFL). He played college football for the Illinois Fighting Illini and was selected by the Pittsburgh Steelers in the third round of the 2021 NFL draft.

== Early life ==
Green grew up in Peoria, Illinois and attended Peoria High School, where he was a member of the baseball, football, and wrestling teams. Green was named first-team All-State as a senior after recording 113 tackles, including 33 for a loss, 15 sacks and four forced fumbles as Peoria won the 2016 IHSA 5A state championship. Green committed to play college football at Illinois over an offer from Iowa.

== College career ==
Green redshirted his true freshman season and moved from defensive tackle to offensive line. Green started all 12 of the Illini's games at left guard as a redshirt freshman. He started all of Illinois' games at left guard again in his redshirt sophomore season and was named honorable mention All-Big Ten Conference as well as an honorable mention All-American by Pro Football Focus (PFF). As a redshirt junior, Green started three games at center and five games at guard in the COVID-19 shortened 2020 Big Ten season and was named first-team All-Big Ten and a second-team All-American by USA Today. Following the end of the season, Green declared that he would forgo his redshirt senior season and enter the 2021 NFL draft.

== Professional career ==
Pre-draft measurables
Height	Weight	Arm length	Hand span	Wingspan	40-yard dash	10-yard split	20-yard split	20-yard shuttle	Three-cone drill	Vertical jump	Broad jump	Bench press
6 ft 1 7/8 in (1.88 m)	305 lb (138 kg)	32 1/4 in (0.82 m)	10 1/8 in (0.26 m)	6 ft 5 in (1.96 m)	4.88 s	1.69 s	2.81 s	4.67 s	7.79 s	35.5 in (0.90 m)	9 ft 11 in (3.02 m)	25 reps
All values from Pro Day

=== Pittsburgh Steelers ===
==== 2021 season ====
Green was drafted by the Pittsburgh Steelers in the third round, 87th overall, of the 2021 NFL draft. On July 20, 2021, Green signed his four-year rookie contract with Pittsburgh.

Heading into organized team activities and his first NFL training camp, Green was listed as the starting center for the Steelers on their training camp depth chart. He faced minor competition from veteran J. C. Hassenauer for his starting job. At the conclusion of the NFL preseason, head coach Mike Tomlin officially named Green the Steelers' starting center.

Green made his first career start and NFL debut in the Steelers' Week 1 victory over the Buffalo Bills. He played in 95% of the offensive snaps in that game, 100% of the offensive snaps in Week 2, and 89% of the offensive snaps in Week 3. Green would play 100% of the Steelers' offensive snaps in every game from Weeks 4–15 and 63% of the offensive snaps in the Steelers' Week 16 loss to the Kansas City Chiefs. In that game, he suffered an injury that ultimately kept him out of the final two games of the season.

Overall, Green finished his rookie season appearing in 15 games (15 starts), playing in 96% of the Steelers' offensive snaps on the season and posting a 53.1 grade from PFF. He committed 6 penalties total, including 4 holding penalties.

=== 2022 season ===
The Steelers moved Green from center to guard in his second season. He competed in the preseason with Kevin Dotson for the starting left guard position, but Dotson prevailed.

Green spent the entire season on the active roster, but was a game day inactive for all 17 games.

=== Houston Texans ===
On August 29, 2023, the Steelers traded Green to the Houston Texans for a 2025 sixth-round pick. He was placed on injured reserve on October 4, after suffering a torn meniscus in Week 4.

=== Buffalo Bills ===
On March 14, 2025, Green signed a one-year contract with the Buffalo Bills. He was released on August 26 as part of final roster cuts and re-signed to the practice squad the next day.

=== Cleveland Browns ===
On December 24, 2025, Green was signed by the Cleveland Browns off the Bills practice squad. He was placed on injured reserve on August 7, 2026. On September 29, 2026, Green was released.

=== New York Giants ===
On October 2, 2026, Green was signed by the New York Giants to their practice squad, reuniting with former offensive line coach Mike Bloomgren.
