= Earnest Brown IV =

American football player (born 1999)

No. 68 – Chicago Bears
- Position: Defensive end
- Roster status: Practice squad

Personal information
- Born: January 8, 1999 (age 27); Aubrey, Texas, U.S.
- Listed height: 6 ft 5 in (1.96 m)
- Listed weight: 295 lb (134 kg)

Career information
- High school: Billy Ryan (Denton, Texas)
- College: Northwestern (2017–2020)
- NFL draft: 2021: 5th round, 174th overall pick

Career history
- Los Angeles Rams (2021–2023); San Francisco 49ers (2024)*; Tampa Bay Buccaneers (2024)*; Dallas Cowboys (2024–2025); Tennessee Titans (2026)*; Chicago Bears (2026–present)*
- * Offseason or practice squad member only

Awards and highlights
- Super Bowl champion (LVI)

Career NFL statistics as of 2024
- Total tackles: 14
- Stats at Pro Football Reference

Earnest Brown IV (born January 8, 1999) is an American professional football defensive end for the Chicago Bears of the National Football League (NFL). He was selected by the Los Angeles Rams in the fifth round of the 2021 NFL draft. He played college football for the Northwestern Wildcats.

== College career ==
Brown was ranked as a four–star recruit by 247Sports.com coming out of high school. He committed to Northwestern on March 22, 2016.

== Professional career ==
Pre-draft measurables
| Height | Weight | Arm length | Hand span | Wingspan | 40-yard dash | 10-yard split | 20-yard split | 20-yard shuttle | Three-cone drill | Vertical jump | Broad jump | Bench press |
|---|---|---|---|---|---|---|---|---|---|---|---|---|
| 6 ft 4 1/2 in (1.94 m) | 270 lb (122 kg) | 34 1/2 in (0.88 m) | 9 3/4 in (0.25 m) | 6 ft 10 1/4 in (2.09 m) | 5.01 s | 1.75 s | 2.98 s | 4.50 s | 7.19 s | 31.0 in (0.79 m) | 9 ft 7 in (2.92 m) | 25 reps |
All values from Pro Day

=== Los Angeles Rams ===
Brown was drafted by the Los Angeles Rams with the 174th pick in the fifth round of the 2021 NFL draft on May 1, 2021. On May 16, 2021, he signed his four-year rookie contract with Los Angeles. He was waived on August 31, 2021, and re-signed to the practice squad the next day. He appeared in 5 games. Brown won Super Bowl LVI when the Rams defeated the Cincinnati Bengals.

On February 15, 2022, Brown signed a reserve/future contract with the Rams. He was waived on August 30, 2022, and signed to the practice squad the next day. He was promoted to the active roster on December 24. He appeared in 7 games.

Brown was released on January 8, 2024 and re-signed to the practice squad. He was not signed to a reserve/future contract after the season and thus became a free agent when his practice squad contract expired.

=== San Francisco 49ers ===
On February 15, 2024, Brown signed with the San Francisco 49ers. He was waived on May 14.

=== Tampa Bay Buccaneers ===
On May 22, 2024, Brown signed with the Tampa Bay Buccaneers. He was placed on injured reserve on September 6. Brown was activated on October 20. On December 31, the Buccaneers re-signed Brown to their practice squad. He appeared in three games.

=== Dallas Cowboys ===
On January 1, 2025, Brown was signed by the Dallas Cowboys off the Buccaneers practice squad. On August 26, Brown was released by the Cowboys as part of final roster cuts and re-signed to the practice squad the next day.

=== Tennessee Titans ===
On February 17, 2026, Brown signed a reserve/futures contract with the Tennessee Titans. On August 30, he was waived by the Titans as a part of final roster cuts before the start of the regular season.

=== Chicago Bears ===
Brown was signed to the Chicago Bears' practice squad on November 4, 2026.

=== NFL statistics ===
| SEASON | TEAM | GP | TOT | SOLO | AST | SACK | FF | FR | YDS | INT | YDS | AVG | TD | LNG | PD | STF | STFYDS | KB |
|---|---|---|---|---|---|---|---|---|---|---|---|---|---|---|---|---|---|---|
| 2022 | LAR | 5 | 9 | 3 | 6 | 0 | 0 | 0 | 0 | 0 | 0 | 0.0 | 0 | 0 | 0 | 1.5 | 2 | 0 |
| 2023 | LAR | 7 | 5 | 2 | 3 | 0 | 0 | 0 | 0 | 0 | 0 | 0.0 | 0 | 0 | 0 | 0 | 0 | 0 |
| Career | | 12 | 14 | 5 | 9 | 0 | 0 | 0 | 0 | 0 | 0 | 0.0 | 0 | 0 | 0 | 1.5 | 2 | 0 |
