= Rasheed Walker =

American football player (born 2000)

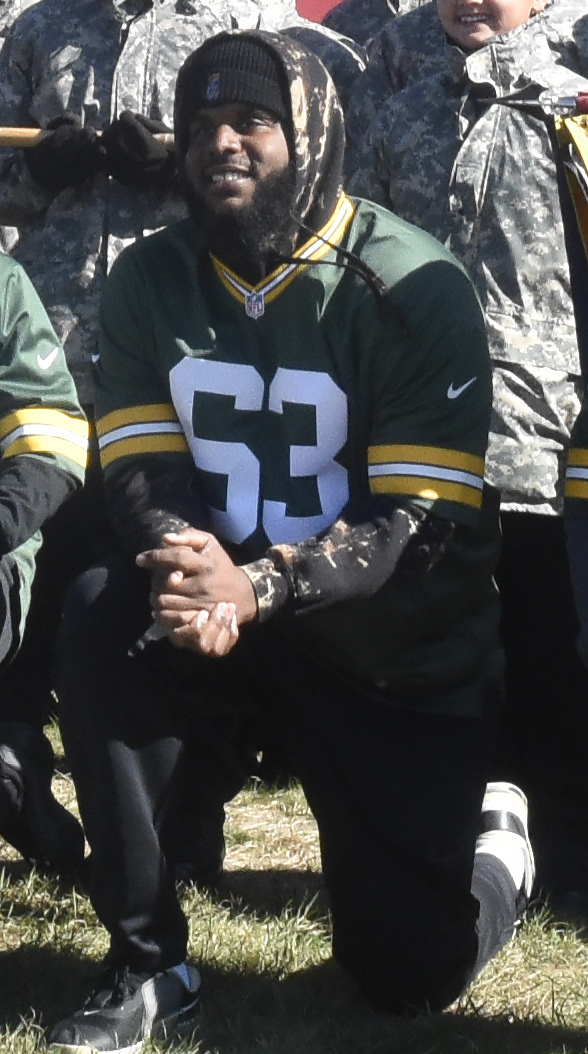
- Walker in 2022

No. 63 – Carolina Panthers
- Position: Offensive tackle
- Roster status: Active

Personal information
- Born: February 13, 2000 (age 26); Washington, D.C., U.S.
- Listed height: 6 ft 6 in (1.98 m)
- Listed weight: 328 lb (149 kg)

Career information
- High school: North Point (Waldorf, Maryland)
- College: Penn State (2018–2021)
- NFL draft: 2022: 7th round, 249th overall pick

Career history
- Green Bay Packers (2022–2025); Carolina Panthers (2026–present)

Awards and highlights
- 2× Third-team All-Big Ten (2020, 2021)

Career NFL statistics as of Week 10, 2026
- Games played: 61
- Games started: 57
- Stats at Pro Football Reference

Rasheed Amar Walker (born February 13, 2000) is an American professional football offensive tackle for the Carolina Panthers of the National Football League (NFL). He played college football for the Penn State Nittany Lions and was selected by the Green Bay Packers in the seventh round of the 2022 NFL draft. He played his first four NFL seasons with Green Bay before joining Carolina in 2026.

== Early life ==
Walker grew up in Waldorf, Maryland and attended North Point High School. He was selected to play in the 2018 US Army All-American Bowl as a senior. He also earned first-team All-Met honors from The Washington Post during his senior season in 2017. Walker was rated a four-star recruit and committed to play college football at Penn State over offers from Ohio State, Maryland, and Virginia Tech.

== College career ==
Walker redshirted in 2018 while appearing in four games. He was named the Nittany Lions' starting left tackle during training camp before the 2019 season and started all 13 of the team's games.

In 2020, Walker started all nine of Penn State's games during its COVID-19-shortened season. He was named third-team All-Big Ten by the media and received honorable mention recognition from the coaches.

In 2021, Walker was a team captain and made 10 starts at left tackle. He again received third-team All-Big Ten honors from the media and honorable mention recognition from the coaches. After the season, Walker announced that he would forgo his remaining collegiate eligibility and enter the 2022 NFL draft.

== Professional career ==
Pre-draft measurables
Height	Weight	Arm length	Hand span	Wingspan
6 ft 5 5/8 in (1.97 m)	313 lb (142 kg)	33 5/8 in (0.85 m)	10 5/8 in (0.27 m)	6 ft 8 1/2 in (2.04 m)
All values from NFL Combine

=== Green Bay Packers ===
Walker was selected by the Green Bay Packers in the seventh round (249th overall) of the 2022 NFL Draft. On May 9, 2022, he signed his rookie contract. He saw his first NFL action on December 25, playing four special teams snaps in a Week 16 victory over the Miami Dolphins.

Walker started his first NFL game on September 17, 2023, during a Week 2 loss to the Atlanta Falcons, replacing an injured David Bakhtiari at left tackle. He was replaced by Yosh Nijman during the Week 8 loss to the Minnesota Vikings and subsequently shared playing time with him. By late December, Walker had regained the full-time left tackle role.

In 2024, Walker started all 17 regular-season games and Green Bay's playoff game.

Walker entered the 2025 season as Green Bay's starting left tackle, winning the job over Jordan Morgan. He started 16 regular-season games and the team's playoff game. ESPN ranked him 11th among offensive tackles in pass-block win rate (94%).

=== Carolina Panthers ===
On March 14, 2026, Walker signed a one-year contract with the Carolina Panthers. The contract had a base value of $4 million and could be worth up to $10 million with incentives. He joined Carolina while starting left tackle Ikem Ekwonu was recovering from a torn patellar tendon.

== NFL career statistics ==
Regular-season statistics through Week 6 of the 2026 season.

Season	Team	Games played	Games started
2022	Green Bay Packers	1	0
2023	Green Bay Packers	17	15
2024	Green Bay Packers	17	17
2025	Green Bay Packers	17	16
2026	Carolina Panthers	9	9
Career		61	57

== Personal life ==
Walker founded Youth Is the Future, an organization that has held youth football camps and offered mentoring programs.

In January 2026, Walker was arrested on firearms charges at New York City's LaGuardia Airport. Police said he had presented a firearm for inspection without the required credentials. His attorney said Walker had voluntarily disclosed an unloaded, secured firearm and that his firearm license was not valid in New York.

In March 2026, The Athletic reported that Walker had entered a pretrial diversion program under which the charges would be dismissed if he was not arrested again during the following six months.
