= Roderick Perry II =

American football player (born 1997)

Nashville Kats (2024)
- Position: Nose tackle
- Roster status: Active

Personal information
- Born: December 3, 1997 (age 28); Raleigh, North Carolina, U.S.
- Listed height: 6 ft 1 in (1.85 m)
- Listed weight: 304 lb (138 kg)

Career information
- High school: Cary (Cary, North Carolina)
- College: South Carolina State (2016–2019); Illinois (2020–2021)
- NFL draft: 2022: undrafted

Career history
- Cleveland Browns (2022); Seattle Seahawks (2023)*; Houston Roughnecks (2024)*; Arlington Renegades (2024)*; Duke City Gladiators (2024); Arizona Rattlers (2024); Nashville Kats (2025–present)
- * Offseason or practice squad member only

Awards and highlights
- IFL National Champion (2024)

Career NFL statistics
- Total tackles: 2
- Stats at Pro Football Reference

Roderick Perry II (born December 3, 1997) is an American professional football nose tackle for the Nashville Kats of the Arena Football One (AF1). He played college football for the South Carolina State Bulldogs and Illinois Fighting Illini.

== Early life ==
Perry attended Cary High School in Cary, North Carolina. He was a two-time all-conference selection in football, and was also a member of the wrestling team, winning the 2016 NCHSAA 4A 285-pound state championship.

== College career ==
Perry played collegiate football at South Carolina State from 2016 to 2019, where he recorded 67 total tackles, with 5.5 sacks. He then transferred to Illinois as a graduate transfer, where he played from 2020 to 2021. While at Illinois, he had 43 total tackles, 4 sacks, and was a 2021 PFF All-Big Ten honorable mention.

== Professional career ==
=== Cleveland Browns ===
After going undrafted in the 2022 NFL draft, Perry was signed by the Cleveland Browns on May 1, 2022. Perry was waived by the Browns on August 30, but re–signed to the team's practice squad the following day. He was promoted to the active roster on November 12. Perry was waived on November 14 and re-signed to the practice squad.

Perry signed a reserve/future contract with Cleveland on January 9, 2023. He was waived by the Browns on May 15.

=== Seattle Seahawks ===
On July 25, 2023, Perry signed with the Seattle Seahawks. He was waived by Seattle on August 1. Perry was re-signed by the Seahawks five days later, but was waived once again on August 29, as a part of final roster cuts.

=== Houston Roughnecks ===
On October 26, 2023, Perry signed with the Houston Roughnecks of the XFL. The Roughnecks brand was transferred to the Houston Gamblers when the XFL and United States Football League merged to create the United Football League (UFL).

=== Arlington Renegades ===
On January 5, 2024, Perry was selected by the Arlington Renegades during the 2024 UFL dispersal draft. He was waived by the Renegades on March 21.

=== Duke City Gladiators ===
On April 15, 2024, Perry signed with the Duke City Gladiators of the Indoor Football League (IFL). He was released by Duke City on June 19.

=== Arizona Rattlers ===
On June 20, 2024, Perry signed with the Arizona Rattlers of the Indoor Football League (IFL).

=== Nashville Kats ===
In February 2025, Perry signed with the Nashville Kats of Arena Football One (AF1).
