= 2020 Rutgers Scarlet Knights football team =

American college football season

2020 Rutgers Scarlet Knights football
- Conference: Big Ten Conference
- East Division
- Record: 3–6 (3–6 Big Ten)
- Head coach: Greg Schiano (12th season)
- Offensive coordinator: Sean Gleeson (1st season)
- Offensive scheme: Spread
- Defensive coordinator: Robb Smith (2nd season)
- Base defense: 4–3
- Home stadium: SHI Stadium

Uniform
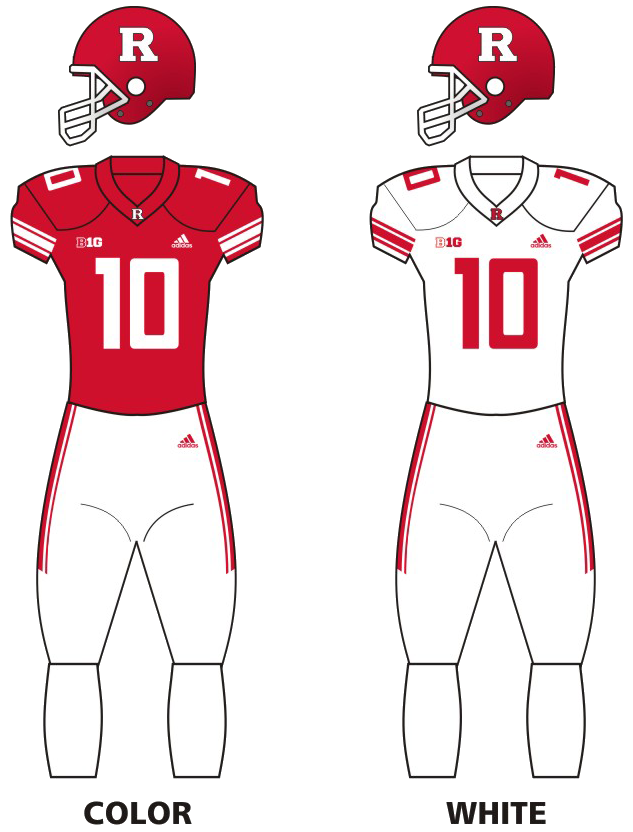

2020 Big Ten Conference football standings
	Conf.			Overall
Team	W		L	W		L
East Division
No. 2 Ohio State xy$^	5	–	0	7	–	1
No. 12 Indiana	6	–	1	6	–	2
Penn State	4	–	5	4	–	5
Maryland	2	–	3	2	–	3
Rutgers	3	–	6	3	–	6
Michigan	2	–	4	2	–	4
Michigan State	2	–	5	2	–	5
West Division
No. 10 Northwestern xy	6	–	1	7	–	2
No. 16 Iowa	6	–	2	6	–	2
Wisconsin	3	–	3	4	–	3
Minnesota	3	–	4	3	–	4
Nebraska	3	–	5	3	–	5
Purdue	2	–	4	2	–	4
Illinois	2	–	6	2	–	6
Championship: Ohio State 22, Northwestern 10
^ – College Football Playoff participant; $ – Conference champion; x – Division champion/co-champions; y – Championship game participant; Note: Due to COVID-19, the Big Ten suspended the season on August 11, but later decided to begin play on October 24. In addition to the title game that was played on December 19, the conference seeded all remaining teams for "championship week" games.; Rankings from AP Poll.

The 2020 Rutgers Scarlet Knights football team represented Rutgers University during the 2020 NCAA Division I FBS football season. The Scarlet Knights played their home games at SHI Stadium in Piscataway, New Jersey, and competed as members of the East Division of the Big Ten Conference. They were led by 12th-year head coach Greg Schiano, in the first season of his second stint with Rutgers.

On August 11, 2020, the Big Ten Conference canceled all fall sports competitions due to the COVID-19 pandemic. On September 16, the Big Ten reinstated the season, announcing an eight-game season beginning on October 24.

== Schedule ==
Rutgers had games scheduled against Monmouth, Syracuse, and Temple, but canceled these games on July 9 due to the Big Ten Conference's decision to play a conference-only schedule due to the COVID-19 pandemic.

Date	Time	Opponent	Site	TV	Result	Attendance
October 24	12:00 p.m.	at Michigan State	Spartan Stadium; East Lansing, MI	BTN	W 38–27	0
October 31	3:30 p.m.	No. 17 Indiana	SHI Stadium; Piscataway, NJ	FS1	L 21–37	0
November 7	7:30 p.m.	at No. 3 Ohio State	Ohio Stadium; Columbus, OH	BTN	L 27–49	1,275
November 14	1:00 p.m.	Illinois	SHI Stadium; Piscataway, NJ	BTN	L 20–23	0
November 21	7:30 p.m.	Michigan	SHI Stadium; Piscataway, NJ	BTN	L 42–48^{3OT}	0
November 28	4:00 p.m.	at Purdue	Ross–Ade Stadium; West Lafayette, IN	FS1	W 37–30	728
December 5	12:00 p.m.	Penn State	SHI Stadium; Piscataway, NJ	FS1	L 7–23	0
December 12	12:00 p.m.	at Maryland	Maryland Stadium; College Park, MD	BTN	W 27–24^{OT}	0
December 18	7:30 p.m.	Nebraska	SHI Stadium; Piscataway, NJ	BTN	L 21–28	0
Rankings from AP Poll and CFP Rankings (after November 24) released prior to game; All times are in Eastern time

== Roster and Coaches ==
2020 Rutgers Scarlet Knights football team roster
Players
Coaches
Offense

Pos.	#	Name	Class
QB	0	Noah Vedral	Jr
RB	1	Isiah Pacheco	Jr
WR	2	Aron Cruickshank	Jr
QB	3	Evan Simon	Fr
RB	4	Aaron Young	So
WR	5	Paul Woods	So
WR	7	Robert Longerbeam	Fr
QB	8	Artur Sitkowski	Jr
WR	9	Monterio Hunt	Sr
TE	10	Matt Alaimo	So
TE	11	Johnathan Lewis	Sr
TE	13	Jovani Haskins	Sr
WR	15	Shameen Jones	Sr
QB	16	Cole Snyder	So
WR	17	Jameer Campbell	Sr
WR	18	Bo Melton	Sr
QB	19	Austin Albericci	So
WR	20	John Guaimano	Fr
QB	21	Johnny Langan	So
RB	22	Kay'Ron Adams	So
RB	23	Kyle Monangai	Fr
RB	27	Piotr Partyla	Fr
WR	28	Nasir Montgomery	Fr
RB	31	Jamier Wright-Collins	So
RB	33	Parker Day	Jr
RB	39	Nyjon Freeman	Fr
RB	40	Joseph Hayford	Sr
WR	41	Frederik Krebs	Fr
TE	45	Brandon Myers	So
OL	50	C. J. Hanson	Fr
OL	53	Tunde Fatukasi	Fr
OL	54	Cedrice Paillant	Jr
OL	57	Zach Miseo	Jr
OL	60	Omari Cooper	Sr
OL	64	Jason Lavigna	Fr
OL	65	Bryan Felter	Fr
OL	66	Nick Krimin	Sr
OL	67	Harry Ganton	Fr
OL	70	Reggie Sutton	So
OL	71	Raiqwon O'Neal	So
OL	72	Hollin Pierce	Fr
OL	73	Brendan Bordner	Jr
OL	74	Isaiah Wright	Fr
OL	75	Beau Lanzidelle	Fr
OL	76	Matt Rosso	So
OL	77	Sam Vretman	Sr
OL	78	Liam Flite	So
WR	81	Rich McDonald	Sr
WR	82	Christian Dremel	Fr
WR	83	Isaiah Washington	So
WR	84	Ahmirr Robinson	Fr
WR	85	Jeesie Parson III	Fr
TE	86	Cooper Heisey	Fr
TE	87	Tahjay Moore	Fr
WR	88	Stanley King	Fr
TE	89	Victor Konopka	Fr
TE	90	Thomas Morgan	Jr

Defense

Pos.	#	Name	Class
DB	0	Christian Izien	So
DB	2	Avery Young	Jr
LB	3	Olakunle Fatukasi	Sr
DB	5	Kessawn Abraham	So
LB	6	Rashawn Battle	Sr
DB	7	Brendon White	Sr
LB	8	Tyshon Fogg	Sr
LB	9	Tyreek Maddox-Williams	Sr
LB	10	Zukudo Igwenagu	Fr
LB	11	Drew Singleton	Jr
DB	12	Peyton Powell	So
DB	13	Chris Long	Fr
DB	16	Max Melton	Fr
LB	17	Deion Jennings	So
DB	18	Keenan Reid	Sr
DB	19	Calebe Silva	Jr
DB	20	Elijuwan Mack	Fr
DB	21	Tre Avery	Sr
DB	22	Tyreem Powell	Fr
DL	23	Elorm Lumor	Sr
DB	24	Naijee Jones	Sr
DL	26	C. J. Onyechi	Jr
LB	28	Aslan Pugh	Sr
DB	29	Lawrence Stevens	Sr
LB	30	Chris Conti	Fr
DB	32	Rani Abdulaziz	Jr
DL	33	Andrew Vince	Fr
LB	35	Jonathan Pimentel	So
DB	36	Darius Gooden	Fr
DB	37	Joe Marfo	Fr
DB	39	Amir Bird	Fr
DL	41	Jack Quander	Fr
DB	42	David Tarallo	Fr
DB	43	Dami Awoyinfa	Fr
DL	44	Brian Ugwu	Fr
DL	45	Jamree Kromah	So
LB	46	Matt Gibney	Fr
DL	50	Julius Turner	Sr
DL	51	Troy Rainey	Fr
DL	55	Malik Barrow	Sr
DL	56	Kamar Missouri	Fr
LB	58	Mohamed Toure	Fr
DL	59	Drew Bethke	Fr
DL	68	Stanley Dennis II	Fr
DL	69	Caleb Patterson	Fr
DL	71	Aaron Lewis	Fr
DL	80	Shawn Collins	Fr
DL	88	René Konga	Fr
DL	90	Wesley Bailey	Fr
DL	91	Tijaun Mason	Jr
DL	92	Mayan Ahanotu	So
DL	93	Ireland Burke	So
DL	94	Kevin Schaeffer	Fr
DL	97	Mike Tverdov	Jr
DL	98	Robin Jutwreten	So
DL	99	Michael Dwumfour	Sr

Special teams

Pos.	#	Name	Class
K	1	Valentino Ambrosio	Jr
P	14	Zach Feagles	Sr
LS	46	Brendan Shank	Jr
LS	47	Billy Taylor	Sr
LS	62	Matthew Sportelli	Sr
P	91	David Broncati	Fr
P	94	Adam Korsak	Sr
K	95	Justin Davidovicz	Sr
K	96	Guy Fava	Fr

Head coach

- Greg Schiano

Coordinators/assistant coaches

- Augie Hoffmann (Running Backs)
- Sean Gleeson (Offensive Coordinator/Quarterbacks)
- Jim Panagos (Defensive Line)*
- Charlie Noonan (Interim Defensive Line)*
- Robb Smith (Defensive Coordinator)
- Andrew Aurich (Offensive Line)
- Tiquan Underwood (Wide Receivers)
- Bob Fraser (Linebackers)
- Nunzio Campanile (Tight Ends)
- Adam Scheier (Special Teams Coordinator)
- Fran Brown (Secondary)
- Jamaal Westerman (Defensive Graduate Assistant)
- Damaso Munoz (Defensive Assistant)
- Ross Douglas (Defensive Graduate Assistant)

Legend

- (C) Team captain
- (S) Suspended
- (I) Ineligible
- Injured
- Redshirt

Roster
Last update: November 2, 2020

* Jim Paganos was unable to coach in 2020 due to knee replacement surgery. Charlie Noonan replaced him as the interim defensive line coach.
