= Shaka Toney =

American football player (born 1998)

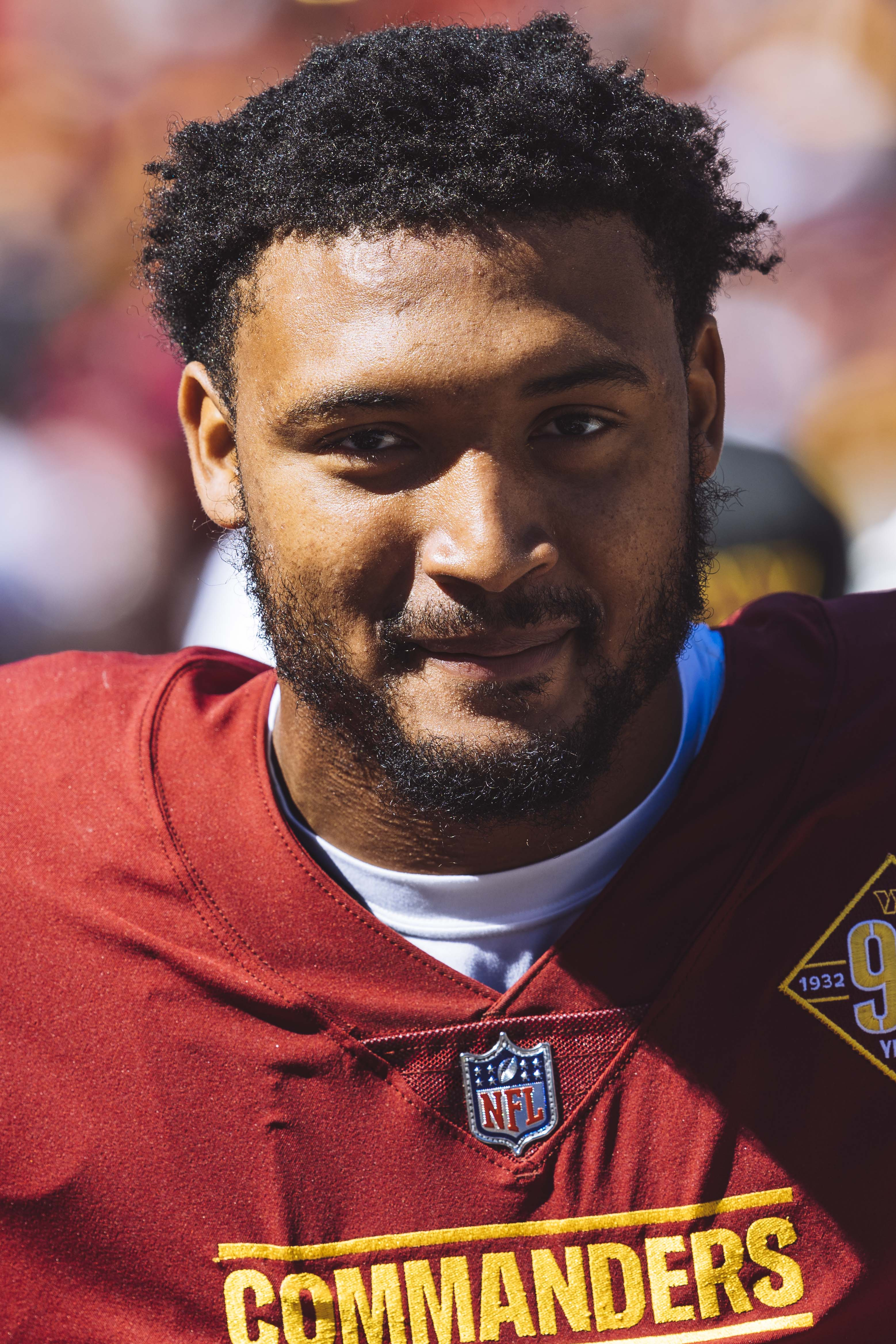
- Toney with the Washington Commanders in 2022

Profile
- Position: Defensive end

Personal information
- Born: January 7, 1998 (age 28); Philadelphia, Pennsylvania, U.S.
- Listed height: 6 ft 2 in (1.88 m)
- Listed weight: 238 lb (108 kg)

Career information
- High school: Imhotep Charter (Philadelphia)
- College: Penn State (2016–2020)
- NFL draft: 2021: 7th round, 246th overall pick

Career history
- Washington Football Team / Commanders (2021–2023); Dallas Cowboys (2024)*; St. Louis Battlehawks (2025)
- * Offseason or practice squad member only

Awards and highlights
- First-team All-Big Ten (2020); Second-team All-Big Ten (2019)

Career NFL statistics
- Tackles: 16
- Sacks: 1.5
- Stats at Pro Football Reference

Shaka Felton Toney (born January 7, 1998) is an American professional football defensive end. He played college football at Penn State and was selected by the Washington Football Team in the seventh round of the 2021 NFL draft. Toney was suspended by the NFL for the 2023 season for betting on NFL games the previous year and was released by Washington upon being reinstated.

== Early life ==
Toney was born on January 8, 1998, in Philadelphia, Pennsylvania, and attended Imhotep Institute Charter High School. As a senior he was named the Pennsylvania Football News Class AAA Defensive Player of the Year and first-team All-State after recording 97 tackles and 21 sacks.

== College career ==
At Penn State, Toney redshirted his true freshman season. As a redshirt freshman Toney recorded 20 tackles with 6.5 tackles for loss and four sacks with two forced fumbles and was named to the Big Ten Network's All-Freshman team. He finished his redshirt sophomore season with 7.5 tackles for loss and five sacks. Toney was named second-team All-Big Ten Conference after making 41 tackles with eight tackles for loss and 6.5 sacks.

== Professional career ==
Pre-draft measurables
| Height | Weight | Arm length | Hand span | 40-yard dash | 10-yard split | 20-yard split | 20-yard shuttle | Three-cone drill | Vertical jump | Broad jump | Bench press |
|---|---|---|---|---|---|---|---|---|---|---|---|
| 6 ft 2 1/2 in (1.89 m) | 242 lb (110 kg) | 33 in (0.84 m) | 9 1/4 in (0.23 m) | 4.52 s | 1.58 s | 2.63 s | 4.29 s | 7.00 s | 39.0 in (0.99 m) | 10 ft 8 in (3.25 m) | 24 reps |

=== Washington Football Team/Commanders ===
Toney was selected by the Washington Commanders in the seventh round (246th overall) of the 2021 NFL draft. He signed his four-year rookie contract on May 13, 2021. In Week 12, Toney recorded his first career sack in a 17–15 victory over the Seattle Seahawks. On April 21, 2023, Toney was suspended indefinitely by the league for betting on NFL games during the 2022 season. He was reinstated on April 18, 2024, and was released by the team four days later.

=== Dallas Cowboys ===
On August 1, 2024, Toney signed with the Dallas Cowboys. He was waived with an injury designation on August 14.

=== St. Louis Battlehawks ===
Toney signed with the St. Louis Battlehawks of the United Football League (UFL) on June 3, 2025.
