= Tommy Togiai =

American football player (born 1999)

No. 72 – Houston Texans
- Position: Defensive tackle
- Roster status: Active

Personal information
- Born: September 19, 1999 (age 27); Blackfoot, Idaho, U.S.
- Listed height: 6 ft 2 in (1.88 m)
- Listed weight: 296 lb (134 kg)

Career information
- High school: Highland (Pocatello, Idaho)
- College: Ohio State (2018–2020)
- NFL draft: 2021: 4th round, 132nd overall pick

Career history
- Cleveland Browns (2021–2022); Jacksonville Jaguars (2023)*; Cleveland Browns (2023)*; Atlanta Falcons (2023); Houston Texans (2024–present)
- * Offseason or practice squad member only

Awards and highlights
- Second-team All-Big Ten (2020)

Career NFL statistics as of 2025
- Total tackles: 116
- Sacks: 4
- Pass deflections: 8
- Fumble recoveries: 2
- Defensive touchdowns: 1
- Stats at Pro Football Reference

Tommy Togiai (TONG-EE-eye; born September 19, 1999) is an American professional football defensive tackle for the Houston Texans of the National Football League (NFL). He played college football for the Ohio State Buckeyes and was selected by the Cleveland Browns in the fourth round of the 2021 NFL draft.

== Early life ==
Togiai is of Samoan descent. He attended Highland High School in Pocatello, Idaho. As a senior, he was the Idaho Gatorade Football Player of the Year after recording 93 tackles, 11 sacks and an interception. Togiai played in the 2018 U. S. Army All-American Bowl. He committed to Ohio State University to play college football.

== College career ==
As a true freshman at Ohio State in 2018, Togiai played in 12 games and had 10 tackles. As a sophomore he had 16 tackles in 14 games. As a junior he had 23 tackles and three sacks. He was forced to miss the 2021 College Football Playoff National Championship due to COVID-19 protocols.

== Professional career ==
Pre-draft measurables
Height	Weight	Arm length	Hand span	Wingspan	40-yard dash	10-yard split	20-yard split	20-yard shuttle	Three-cone drill	Vertical jump	Broad jump	Bench press
6 ft 1 1/2 in (1.87 m)	296 lb (134 kg)	31 3/4 in (0.81 m)	8 7/8 in (0.23 m)	6 ft 4 1/4 in (1.94 m)	4.98 s	1.78 s	2.90 s	4.51 s	7.21 s	32.0 in (0.81 m)	8 ft 9 in (2.67 m)	40 reps
All values from Pro Day

=== Cleveland Browns ===
Togiai was selected by the Cleveland Browns in the fourth round with the 132nd overall pick in the 2021 NFL draft. On May 21, 2021, he signed his four-year rookie contract with Cleveland. Togiai was released by the Browns on August 29, 2023.

=== Jacksonville Jaguars ===
The Jacksonville Jaguars signed Togiai to their practice squad on August 31, 2023. He was released on September 4.

=== Cleveland Browns (second stint) ===
The Browns signed Togiai back to their practice squad on September 12, 2023.

=== Atlanta Falcons ===
The Atlanta Falcons signed Togiai to their active roster on December 20, 2023.

Togiai was released by the Falcons as part of final roster cuts on August 27, 2024.

=== Houston Texans ===
On September 17, 2024, Togiai signed with the Houston Texans' practice squad. He was promoted to the active roster on November 27. Togiai made five appearances (one start) for Houston, recording 11 combined tackles.

On September 9, 2025, Togiai and the Texans agreed to a one-year, $3.3 million contract extension. In Houston's regular season finale against the Indianapolis Colts, Togiai recovered a fumble in the final seconds of the game and returned it for a touchdown to seal the 38-30 victory.

== NFL career statistics ==
Legend
**Bold**	Career high

=== Regular season ===
Year	Team	Games		Tackles					Interceptions						Fumbles				
Year	Team	GP	GS	Cmb	Solo	Ast	Sck	TFL	Int	Yds	Avg	Lng	TD	PD	FF	Fum	FR	Yds	TD
2021	CLE	6	0	16	9	7	0.5	0	0	0	0.0	0	0	1	0	0	0	0	0
2022	CLE	12	2	13	3	10	0.5	0	0	0	0.0	0	0	1	0	0	**1**	0	0
2024	HOU	8	0	28	11	17	**1.5**	2	0	0	0.0	0	0	2	0	0	0	0	0
2025	HOU	**15**	**6**	**59**	**27**	**32**	**1.5**	**6**	0	0	0.0	0	0	**4**	0	0	**1**	**17**	**1**
Career		41	8	116	50	66	4.0	8	0	0	0.0	0	0	8	0	0	2	17	1

=== Postseason ===
Year	Team	Games		Tackles					Interceptions						Fumbles				
Year	Team	GP	GS	Cmb	Solo	Ast	Sck	TFL	Int	Yds	Avg	Lng	TD	PD	FF	Fum	FR	Yds	TD
2024	HOU	**2**	0	2	1	1	**1.0**	1	0	0	0.0	0	0	0	0	0	0	0	0
2025	HOU	**2**	**2**	**13**	**5**	**8**	0.0	**2**	0	0	0.0	0	0	0	**1**	0	0	0	0
Career		4	2	15	6	9	1.0	3	0	0	0.0	0	0	0	1	0	0	0	0

== Personal life ==
Togiai is the cousin of NFL offensive guard Tanoa Togiai.
