= Shaun Wade =

American football player (born 1998)

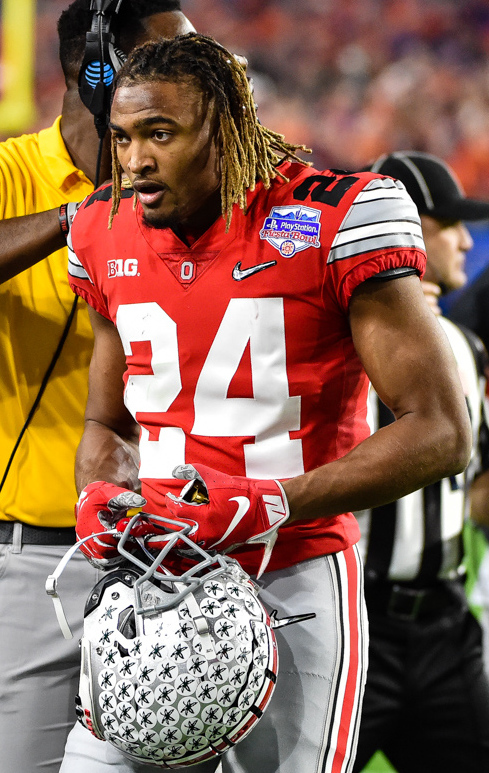
- Wade with the Ohio State Buckeyes in 2019

Profile
- Position: Cornerback

Personal information
- Born: September 15, 1998 (age 28); Jacksonville, Florida, U.S.
- Listed height: 6 ft 1 in (1.85 m)
- Listed weight: 191 lb (87 kg)

Career information
- High school: Trinity Christian Academy (Jacksonville)
- College: Ohio State (2017–2020)
- NFL draft: 2021: 5th round, 160th overall pick

Career history
- Baltimore Ravens (2021)*; New England Patriots (2021–2023); Los Angeles Chargers (2024); Chicago Bears (2025)*; Dallas Renegades (2026); Philadelphia Eagles (2026)*
- * Offseason or practice squad member only

Awards and highlights
- Consensus All-American (2020); Big Ten Defensive Back of the Year (2020); First-team All-Big Ten (2020); Third-team All-Big Ten (2019)

Career NFL statistics
- Total tackles: 26
- Pass deflections: 1
- Stats at Pro Football Reference

Shaun Wade (born September 15, 1998) is an American professional football cornerback. He played college football for the Ohio State Buckeyes, earning Big Ten Defensive Back of the Year honors and a consensus All-American selection in 2020. He was selected by the Baltimore Ravens in the 2021 NFL draft, but traded to the Patriots before playing a game. Wade was named USA Today's High School Football Defensive Player of the Year in 2016.

== Early life ==
Wade was born on September 15, 1998, and attended Trinity Christian Academy in Jacksonville, Florida. While in high school, Wade's teams won the Florida State Championship all four years that he played. As a senior he was the USA Today High School Football Player of the Year and won the Lockheed Martin defensive back of the year awarded by the U.S. Army All-American Bowl. A five-star recruit, he committed to Ohio State University to play college football.

== College career ==
After redshirting his first year at Ohio State in 2017, Wade played in all 14 games in 2018. He finished the season with 31 tackles and three interceptions. He returned to Ohio State his redshirt sophomore year in 2019. Wade graduated with a Bachelor of Science degree in sports industry.

== Professional career ==
Pre-draft measurables
Height	Weight	Arm length	Hand span	Wingspan	40-yard dash	10-yard split	20-yard split	Vertical jump	Broad jump
6 ft 0 5/8 in (1.84 m)	196 lb (89 kg)	33 1/2 in (0.85 m)	9 1/4 in (0.23 m)	6 ft 6 in (1.98 m)	4.46 s	1.53 s	2.56 s	37.5 in (0.95 m)	10 ft 3 in (3.12 m)
All values from Pro Day

=== Baltimore Ravens ===
Wade was selected by the Baltimore Ravens in the fifth round (160th overall) of the 2021 NFL draft. He signed his four-year rookie contract on May 12, 2021.

=== New England Patriots ===
On August 26, 2021, Wade was traded to the New England Patriots in exchange for a 2022 seventh-round pick and a 2023 fifth-round pick.

After primarily playing as a backup his first two seasons, Wade saw an uptick in playing time in 2023 due to injuries. He played in 14 games with six starts, recording 23 tackles and one pass deflection.

Wade was waived by the Patriots on August 27, 2024.

=== Los Angeles Chargers ===
On September 2, 2024, Wade was signed to the Los Angeles Chargers practice squad. He was promoted to the active roster on October 21. He was released and re-signed to the practice squad on October 24.

=== Chicago Bears ===
On April 3, 2025, Wade signed a one-year contract with the Chicago Bears. He was placed on injured reserve on August 12.

=== Dallas Renegades ===
On January 14, 2026, Wade was drafted by the Dallas Renegades of the United Football League (UFL).

=== Philadelphia Eagles ===
On June 16, 2026, Wade signed with the Philadelphia Eagles. He was released by the Eagles on August 30 as part of final roster cuts. On September 24, he was re-signed to the practice squad. On October 13, Wade was released. He re-signed to the practice squad on October 28. He was released on November 16.
