= Josh Myers (American football) =

American football player (born 1998)

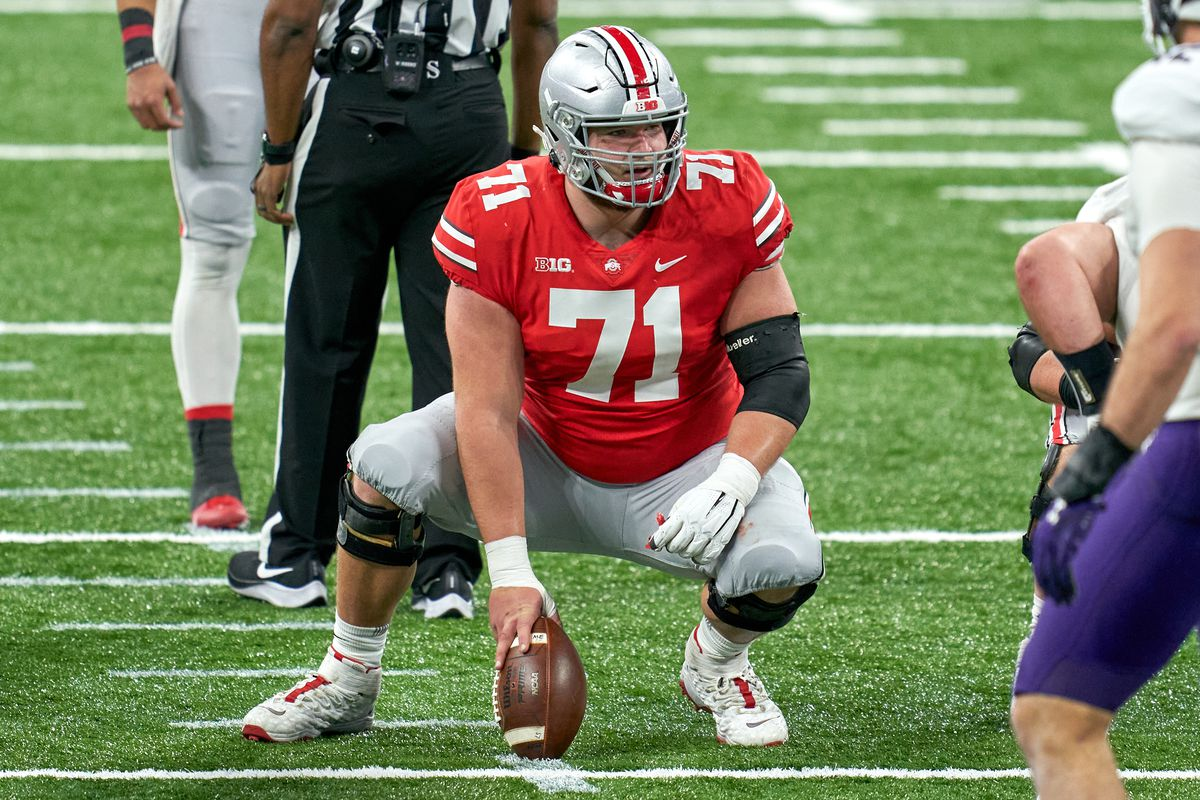
- Myers with the Ohio State Buckeyes

No. 71 – New York Jets
- Position: Center
- Roster status: Active

Personal information
- Born: July 16, 1998 (age 28); Dayton, Ohio, U.S.
- Listed height: 6 ft 5 in (1.96 m)
- Listed weight: 310 lb (141 kg)

Career information
- High school: Miamisburg (Miamisburg, Ohio)
- College: Ohio State (2017–2020)
- NFL draft: 2021: 2nd round, 62nd overall pick

Career history
- Green Bay Packers (2021–2024); New York Jets (2025–present)

Awards and highlights
- Second-team All-American (2020); First-team All-Big Ten (2020); Second-team All-Big Ten (2019)

Career NFL statistics as of Week 5, 2026
- Games played: 78
- Games started: 78
- Stats at Pro Football Reference

Joshua David Myers (born July 16, 1998) is an American professional football center for the New York Jets of the National Football League (NFL). He played college football for the Ohio State Buckeyes, and was selected by the Green Bay Packers in the second round of the 2021 NFL draft.

== Early life ==
Myers was born in Dayton, Ohio, grew up in Miamisburg, Ohio and attended Miamisburg High School. He was named first-team Division II All-State as a junior and senior and also played in the 2017 All-American Bowl.

== College career ==
Myers redshirted his true freshman season as he moved from guard to center. He played in ten games as a redshirt freshman as the backup to starting center Michael Jordan. Myers was named the starting center going into his redshirt sophomore season. He played over 900 offensive snaps and was named second-team All-Big Ten Conference by the league's coaches. Myers was named a team captain going into his redshirt junior year.

== Professional career ==
Pre-draft measurables
Height	Weight	Arm length	Hand span	Wingspan	Bench press
6 ft 5 1/4 in (1.96 m)	310 lb (141 kg)	32 in (0.81 m)	10 3/8 in (0.26 m)	6 ft 5 3/8 in (1.97 m)	29 reps
All values from Pro Day

=== Green Bay Packers ===
On April 30, 2021, Myers was selected in the second round (62nd overall) by the Green Bay Packers in the 2021 NFL draft. He signed his four-year rookie contract on May 14, 2021, worth $5.58 million, including a $1.41 million signing bonus.

Myers was named the Packers starting center as a rookie, replacing All-Pro center Corey Linsley who had left for the Los Angeles Chargers. Myers started five games before suffering a knee injury in Week 6. He was placed on injured reserve on October 23, 2021. He was activated off injured reserve on January 8, 2022. At the end of the 2024 season, Myers was named the Packers recipient of the Ed Block Courage award after missing only one game despite battling wrist and pectoral injuries.

=== New York Jets ===
On March 14, 2025, Myers signed a one-year, $3.5 million contract with the New York Jets. On December 12, Myers signed a two-year, $11 million contract extension with the Jets.
