= Chauncey Golston =

American football player (born 1998)

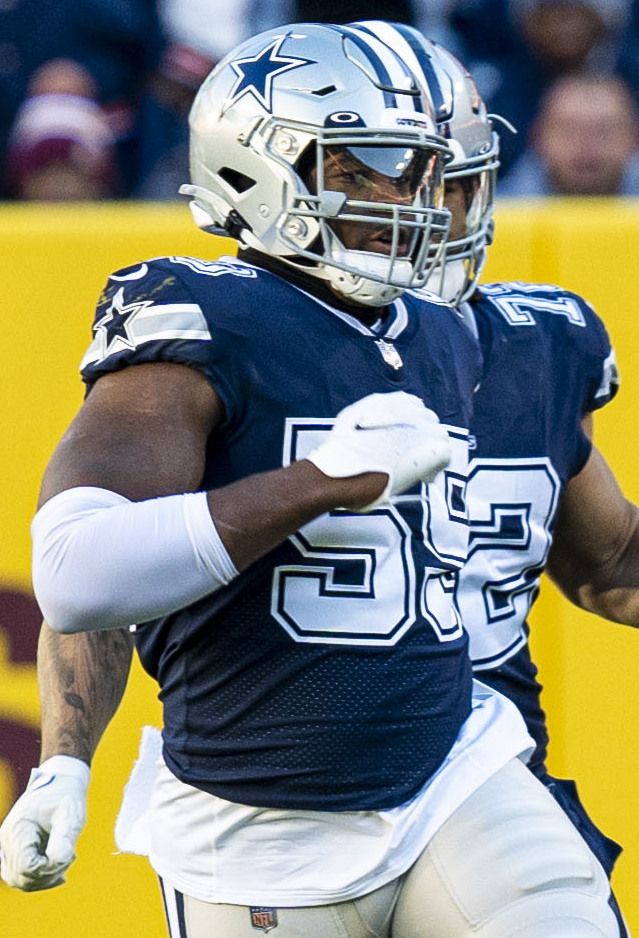
- Golston with the Dallas Cowboys in 2021

No. 57 – New York Giants
- Position: Defensive tackle
- Roster status: Injured reserve

Personal information
- Born: February 10, 1998 (age 28); Detroit, Michigan, U.S.
- Listed height: 6 ft 5 in (1.96 m)
- Listed weight: 277 lb (126 kg)

Career information
- High school: East English Village Prep (Detroit)
- College: Iowa (2016–2020)
- NFL draft: 2021: 3rd round, 84th overall pick

Career history
- Dallas Cowboys (2021–2024); New York Giants (2025–present)

Awards and highlights
- First-team All-Big Ten (2020)

Career NFL statistics as of 2025
- Total tackles: 155
- Sacks: 10
- Forced fumbles: 1
- Fumble recoveries: 2
- Pass deflections: 7
- Interceptions: 1
- Stats at Pro Football Reference

Chauncey Golston (born February 10, 1998) is an American professional football outside linebacker for the New York Giants of the National Football League (NFL). He was selected by the Dallas Cowboys in the third round of the 2021 NFL draft. He played college football for the Iowa Hawkeyes.

== Early life ==
Golston attended East English Village Preparatory Academy. He contributed to the team qualifying for the state playoffs in three straight years. As a junior, he tallied 53 tackles and 13 sacks, while receiving honorable-mention all-city honors.

As a senior, he posted 43 tackles and 9 sacks, while receiving first-team all-state, all-metro and all-city honors.

== College career ==
Golston accepted a football scholarship from the University of Iowa. As a redshirt freshman, he was a backup at defensive end and totaled 2 tackles.

As a sophomore, he appeared in all 13 games as a key reserve player, collecting 35 tackles (9 for loss), 3.5 sacks, 3 quarterback pressures, one interception, one pass breakup and 3 fumble recoveries (led the team). He had 3 tackles and one sack against the University of Minnesota. He made 5 tackles and one sack against Northwestern University.

As a junior, he was named a starter at defensive end for all 13 games in the team's 4-3 defense. He recorded 47 tackles (9.5 for loss), 3 sacks, 7 quarterback pressures, one interception and 5 pass break-ups. He had 8 tackles (2 for loss), one sack and 2 quarterback pressures against the University of Michigan. He made 8 tackles (1.5 for loss) and one sack against Penn State University.

As a senior in 2020, the football season was reduced to 8 games due to the COVID-19 pandemic. He started all 8 games at defensive end, registering 45 tackles (8.5 for loss), 5.5 sacks, 3 quarterback pressures, one interception, one forced fumble and one pass breakup. He had 7 tackles (1.5 for loss), a shared sack and one quarterback pressure against Northwestern University. He made 6 tackles (2 for loss) and 1.5 sacks against Michigan State University. He had 4 tackles (2 for loss), one sack and one interception against Penn State University. He made 8 tackles and one sack against the University of Illinois.

== Professional career ==
Pre-draft measurables
Height	Weight	Arm length	Hand span	Wingspan	40-yard dash	10-yard split	20-yard split	20-yard shuttle	Three-cone drill	Vertical jump	Broad jump	Bench press
6 ft 4 3/4 in (1.95 m)	269 lb (122 kg)	34 3/4 in (0.88 m)	10 7/8 in (0.28 m)	7 ft 0 1/4 in (2.14 m)	4.83 s	1.63 s	2.83 s	4.59 s	7.47 s	36.0 in (0.91 m)	9 ft 11 in (3.02 m)	22 reps
All values from Pro Day

=== Dallas Cowboys ===
Golston was selected by the Dallas Cowboys in the third round (84th overall) of the 2021 NFL draft. He signed his four-year rookie contract with Dallas on July 21, 2021. He spent training camp on Active/PUP with a hamstring injury and was activated on the final cut date. During the season he was used between defensive end and defensive tackle. He appeared in 15 games, posting 33 tackles (one for a loss), one sack and 8 quarterback pressures.

In 2022, he appeared in 15 games, making 22 tackles (one for loss), one sack, 7 quarterback pressures and one pass breakup. In Week 3 against the New York Giants, he had 2 tackles and a season-high 3 quarterback pressures. In the season finale against the Washington Commanders, he made 11 tackles. In the playoffs he had one tackle and 2 quarterback pressures against the Tampa Bay Buccaneers, while adding one tackle and one pressure against the San Francisco 49ers.

In 2023, he appeared in all 17 games with 3 starts, posting 24 tackles (one for loss), 1.5 sacks, 12 quarterback pressures, tied for the team lead with 4 special teams tackles and successfully converted a two-point conversion catching a pass from punter Bryan Anger on a fake PAT attempt. In the season opener against the New York Giants, he had one tackle, one sack, 2 quarterback pressures and his first career forced fumble. In Week 2 against the New York Jets, he made his first career start, tallying a tackle and a quarterback pressure. In Week 12 against the Washington Commanders, he made a season-high 4 tackles, one quarterback hurry and added his first career special teams tackle. In the playoffs he had 4 tackles against the Green Bay Packers.

In 2024 he appeared in all 17 games. A DeMarcus Lawrence season-ending foot injury opened the door to record career highs in starts (13), tackles (55), sacks (5.5), quarterback pressures (33), passes defensed (5) and also had his first career interception in Week 12 against the Washington Commanders.

=== New York Giants ===
On March 13, 2025, Golston signed a three-year, $19.5 million contract with the New York Giants. He appeared in 10 games with one start, missing 7 games with ankle and neck injuries. He struggled on the field, playing only 173 defensive snaps, while generating 20 tackles, one sack and five quarterback pressures.
