= Wyatt Davis =

American football player (born 1999)

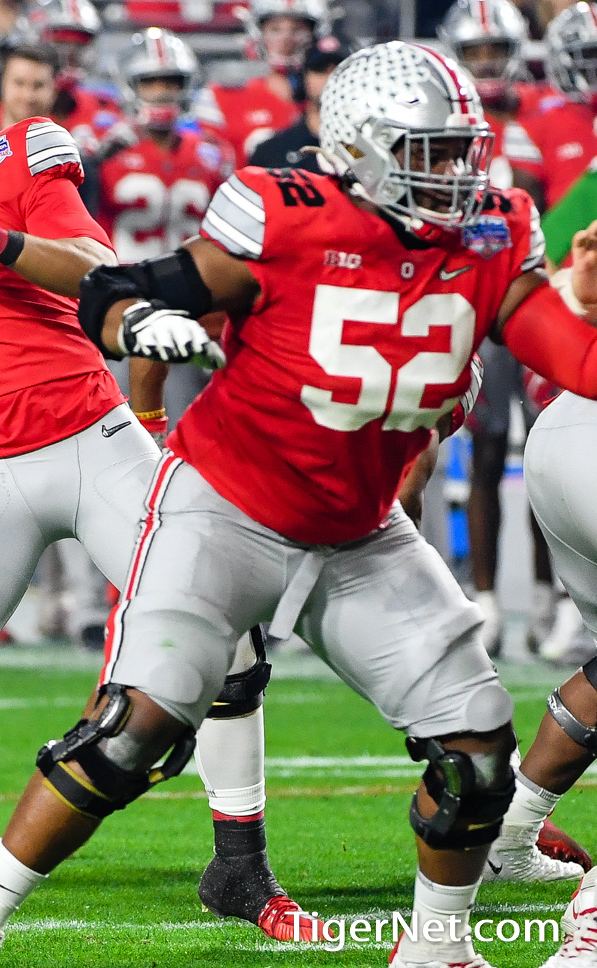
- Davis with the Ohio State Buckeyes in 2019

Profile
- Position: Guard

Personal information
- Born: February 17, 1999 (age 27); Rancho Palos Verdes, California, U.S.
- Listed height: 6 ft 4 in (1.93 m)
- Listed weight: 315 lb (143 kg)

Career information
- High school: St. John Bosco (Bellflower, California)
- College: Ohio State (2017–2020)
- NFL draft: 2021: 3rd round, 86th overall pick

Career history
- Minnesota Vikings (2021); New York Giants (2022)*; New Orleans Saints (2022); Arizona Cardinals (2022); New York Giants (2022–2023); Cleveland Browns (2024)*
- * Offseason or practice squad member only

Awards and highlights
- Unanimous All-American (2020); Consensus All-American (2019); Big Ten Offensive Lineman of the Year (2020); 2× First-team All-Big Ten (2019, 2020)

Career NFL statistics
- Games played: 9
- Stats at Pro Football Reference

Wyatt Davis (born February 17, 1999) is an American professional football guard. He played college football for the Ohio State Buckeyes, and was selected by the Minnesota Vikings in the third round of the 2021 NFL draft. He has also played for the New Orleans Saints, Arizona Cardinals and New York Giants.

== Early life ==
Davis grew up in Rancho Palos Verdes, California, and attended St. John Bosco High School. Davis was rated a five-star recruit by Rivals, 247Sports and Scout and committed to play college football at Ohio State over offers from Alabama, Michigan, Notre Dame, Stanford, UCLA, USC and Washington.

== College career ==
Davis redshirted his true freshman season in 2017. Originally a reserve guard during his redshirt freshman season, Davis started the final two games of the Buckeyes' season, the 2018 Big Ten Football Championship Game and the 2019 Rose Bowl, and played a total of 241 total snaps. As a redshirt sophomore, Davis was named first-team All-Big Ten Conference and a first team All-American by the Associated Press and the Sporting News. Davis was named to the Big Ten Network's second-team All-Decade team for the 2010s.

Following the announcement that the Big Ten would postpone the 2020 season, Davis announced that he would opt out but returned when the conference reversed its decision, and he was named a unanimous All-American. He declared for the 2021 NFL draft following the season.

== Professional career ==
Pre-draft measurables
Height	Weight	Arm length	Hand span	Bench press
6 ft 3 5/8 in (1.92 m)	315 lb (143 kg)	33 7/8 in (0.86 m)	9 1/8 in (0.23 m)	25 reps
All values from Pro Day

=== Minnesota Vikings ===
Davis was selected in the third round (86th overall) by the Minnesota Vikings in the 2021 NFL draft.

Heading into his inaugural training camp in the NFL, Davis was the starting right guard for the Vikings, but he also faced competition from Oli Udoh. After struggling heavily in the Vikings' preseason games, Davis was named the backup right guard behind Udoh for the 2021 season.

Davis finished his rookie season having appeared in 6 games (0 starts), playing exclusively on special teams and recording zero offensive snaps.

Davis competed for a starting job in training camp against Udoh, Jesse Davis, and rookie Ed Ingram. On August 30, 2022, Davis was waived by the Vikings as a part of final roster cuts.

=== New York Giants (first stint) ===
On September 1, 2022, the New York Giants signed Davis to their practice squad.

=== New Orleans Saints ===
On September 8, 2022, the New Orleans Saints signed Davis to their active roster. He was waived on November 8.

=== Arizona Cardinals ===
On November 9, 2022, Davis was claimed off waivers by the Arizona Cardinals. He was released on December 27, 2022.

=== New York Giants (second stint) ===
On December 28, 2022, Davis was claimed off waivers by the Giants. He was waived/injured on August 29, 2023, and placed on injured reserve.

=== Cleveland Browns ===
On June 7, 2024, Davis signed with the Cleveland Browns. He was waived on August 26.

== Personal life ==
Davis is the son of actor Duane Davis, mother Inge Davis and the grandson of Pro Football Hall of Famer Willie Davis.
