= Jamar Johnson =

American football player (born 1999)

Profile
- Position: Safety

Personal information
- Born: November 22, 1999 (age 26); Sarasota, Florida, U.S.
- Listed height: 6 ft 1 in (1.85 m)
- Listed weight: 197 lb (89 kg)

Career information
- High school: Riverview (Sarasota)
- College: Indiana (2018–2020)
- NFL draft: 2021: 5th round, 164th overall pick

Career history
- Denver Broncos (2021); Arlington Renegades (2023); New Orleans Breakers (2023); Saskatchewan Roughriders (2024)*
- * Offseason or practice squad member only

Awards and highlights
- First-team All-Big Ten (2020)
- Stats at Pro Football Reference

Jamar Johnson (born November 22, 1999) is an American professional football player who is a safety. He played college football at Indiana. He was selected by the Denver Broncos in the fifth round of the 2021 NFL draft.

== Early life ==
Johnson attended Riverview High School in Sarasota, Florida. As a senior he had 62 tackles, six interceptions, one sack and one touchdown. He committed to Indiana University to play college football.

== College career ==
Johnson played at Indiana from 2018 to 2020. He spent his first two seasons as a backup before becoming a starter his junior year in 2020. After the 2020 season, he decided to forgo his senior season and enter the 2021 NFL draft. He finished his career with 69 tackles, seven interceptions, four sacks and a touchdown.

== Professional career ==
Pre-draft measurables
Height	Weight	Arm length	Hand span	40-yard dash	10-yard split	20-yard split	20-yard shuttle	Three-cone drill	Vertical jump	Broad jump	Bench press
5 ft 11 7/8 in (1.83 m)	205 lb (93 kg)	30 1/8 in (0.77 m)	9 1/4 in (0.23 m)	4.58 s	1.62 s	2.69 s	4.45 s	7.22 s	35.0 in (0.89 m)	10 ft 2 in (3.10 m)	17 reps
All values from Pro Day

=== Denver Broncos ===
Johnson was drafted by the Denver Broncos in the fifth round, 164th overall, of the 2021 NFL draft. He signed his four-year rookie contract on May 13, 2021. Johnson made three appearances for Denver during his rookie campaign, playing primarily on special teams. He was released by the Broncos on August 16, 2022.

=== Arlington Renegades ===
Johnson signed with the Arlington Renegades of the XFL on March 7, 2023. He was released by Arlington on April 19.

=== New Orleans Breakers ===
Johnson signed with the New Orleans Breakers of the United States Football League on April 20, 2023, and was subsequently placed on the team's inactive list. He was released by New Orleans on May 30.

=== Saskatchewan Roughriders ===
Johnson was signed by the Saskatchewan Roughriders of the Canadian Football League on March 5, 2024. He was released by the Roughriders on May 15.
