= 2021 Indiana Hoosiers football team =

American college football season

2021 Indiana Hoosiers football
- Conference: Big Ten Conference
- East Division
- Record: 2–10 (0–9 Big Ten)
- Head coach: Tom Allen (5th season)
- Offensive coordinator: Nick Sheridan (2nd season)
- Co-offensive coordinator: Grant Heard (2nd season)
- Offensive scheme: Spread
- Defensive coordinator: Charlton Warren (1st season)
- Co-defensive coordinator: Kevin Peoples (2nd season)
- Base defense: Multiple 4–2–5
- MVPs: Peyton Hendershot; Micah McFadden
- Captains: Ty Fryfogle; Peyton Hendershot; Cam Jones; Marcelino McCrary-Ball; Micah McFadden; Michael Penix Jr.
- Home stadium: Memorial Stadium

Uniform
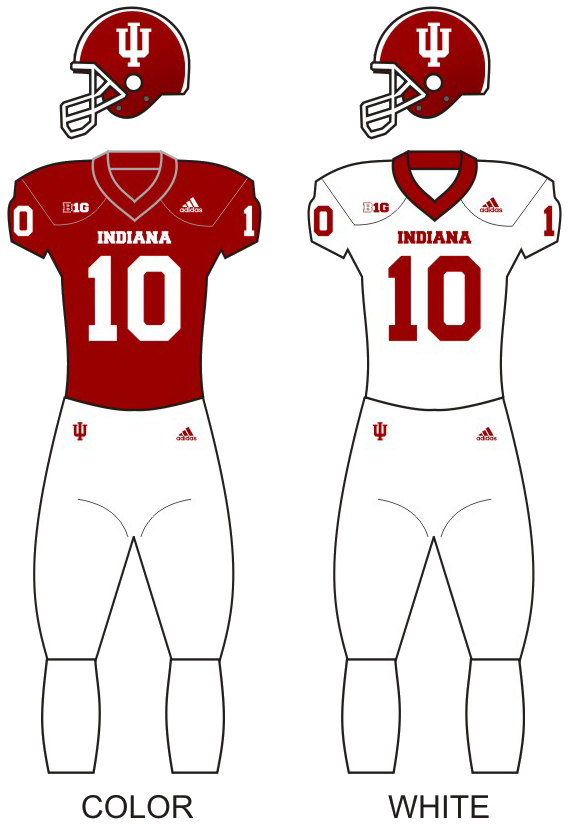

2021 Big Ten Conference football standings
	Conf.			Overall
Team	W		L	W		L
East Division
No. 3 Michigan xy$^	8	–	1	12	–	2
No. 6 Ohio State x	8	–	1	11	–	2
No. 9 Michigan State	7	–	2	11	–	2
Penn State	4	–	5	7	–	6
Maryland	3	–	6	7	–	6
Rutgers	2	–	7	5	–	8
Indiana	0	–	9	2	–	10
West Division
No. 23 Iowa xy	7	–	2	10	–	4
Minnesota	6	–	3	9	–	4
Wisconsin	6	–	3	9	–	4
Purdue	6	–	3	9	–	4
Illinois	4	–	5	5	–	7
Nebraska	1	–	8	3	–	9
Northwestern	1	–	8	3	–	9
Championship: Michigan 42, Iowa 3
^ – College Football Playoff participant; $ – Conference champion; x – Division champion/co-champions; y – Championship game participant; Rankings from AP Poll

The 2021 Indiana Hoosiers football team represented Indiana University in the 2021 NCAA Division I FBS football season. The Hoosiers played their home games at Memorial Stadium in Bloomington, Indiana, and competed as a member of the East Division of the Big Ten Conference. The team was led by fifth-year head coach Tom Allen.

Indiana finished the season with a 2–10 record, which would be their worst season since 2011, when they finished 1–11.

== Spring Game ==
The 2021 Spring Game was held in Bloomington, Indiana on April 10; however, it was a closed-practice, with the general public not in attendance.

== Offseason ==
=== Coaching changes ===
On December 12, 2020, the South Alabama Jaguars announced that they had hired Indiana defensive coordinator Kane Wommack as their new head coach; Wommack had previously served three years for the Hoosiers in a defensive coaching capacity, first as its linebackers coach in 2018 and then as its defensive coordinator for 2019 and 2020. On January 17, 2021, Indiana announced that they had hired Georgia Bulldogs defensive backs coach Charlton Warren as the Hoosiers' new defensive coordinator; Warren had served as the defensive back coach for Georgia for two years (2019–2020).

On January 13, 2021, the Michigan Wolverines announced that they had hired Indiana running backs' coach Mike Hart as their new running backs' coach; Hart had served four years as the Hoosiers' running backs coach (2017–2020) and also split time as the Assistant Head Coach. On February 8, 2021, Indiana announced that they had hired Kansas City Chiefs running backs' coach Deland McCullough as the Hoosiers' new running backs coach; McCullough had previously served as the Hoosiers' running backs' coach from 2011 to 2016.

=== Transfers ===
Outgoing

Notable departures from the 2020 squad included:

Name	Number	Pos.	Height	Weight	Year	Hometown	Notes
Harry Crider	57	Offensive lineman	6'4'	311	Senior	Columbus, Indiana	Declared for NFL Draft
Jerome Johnson	98	Defensive lineman	6'3'	304	Senior (Redshirt)	Bassfield, Mississippi	Declared for NFL Draft
Whop Philyor	1	Wide Receiver	5'11'	180	Senior	Tampa, Florida	Declared for NFL Draft
Jovan Swann	51	Defensive lineman	6'2'	280	Graduate Transfer	Greenwood, Indiana	Declared for NFL Draft
Haydon Whitehead	94	Punter	6'2'	219	Graduate student	Melbourne, Australia	Declared for NFL Draft
Rashawn Williams	13	Wide receiver	6'2'	200	Freshman (Redshirt)	Detroit, Michigan	Transferred

Incoming

Name	Number	Pos.	Height	Weight	Year	Hometown	Notes	Prev. School
Ryder Anderson	10	Defensive lineman	6'6"	266	Graduate Student	Katy, Texas	Graduate Transfer	Ole Miss
James Bomba	48	Tight end	6'6"	230	Graduate Student	Bloomington, Indiana	Sophomore	Miami (OH)
Zach Carpenter	58	Offensive lineman	6'5"	329	Sophomore (Redshirt)	Cincinnati, Ohio	Transfer	Michigan
Stephen Carr	5	Running back	6'0"	215	Senior (Redshirt)	Gardena, California	Transfer	USC
Jaren Handy	13	Defensive lineman	6'5"	255	Junior	Hattiesburg, Mississippi	Transfer	Auburn
Weston Kramer	99	Defensive lineman	6'1"	290	Graduate Student	Naperville, Illinois	Graduate Transfer	Northern Illinois
DJ Matthews	1	Wide receiver	5'10"	160	Senior (Redshirt)	Indianapolis, Indiana	Graduate transfer	Florida State
Deland McCullough II	25	Defensive Back	6'1"	195	Freshman (Redshirt)	Bloomington, Indiana	Transfer	Miami (OH)
Jonathan Haynes	17	Defensive Back	5'11"	205	Graduate Student	Benoit, Mississippi	Graduate transfer	Ole Miss

=== 2021 NFL draft ===
Hoosiers who were picked in the 2021 NFL draft:

Round	Pick	Player	Position	Team
5	164	Jamar Johnson	Safety	Denver Broncos

== Preseason ==
=== Recruits ===
The Hoosiers signed a total of 14 recruits.

College recruiting (2021)
Name	Hometown	School	Height	Weight	Commit date
Jordyn Williams; WR	Cedar Hill, TX	Trinity Christian School	6 ft 1 in (1.85 m)	182 lb (83 kg)	May 15, 2020
Jordyn Williams; WR	Recruit ratings: Scout: Rivals: 247Sports: ESPN:				
Joshua Sales; OT	Brownsburg, Indiana	Brownsburg High School	6 ft 6 in (1.98 m)	305 lb (138 kg)	Aug 1, 2020
Joshua Sales; OT	Recruit ratings: Scout: Rivals: 247Sports: ESPN:				
Vinny Fiacable; OG	Fort Wayne, Indiana	Bishop Dwenger High School	6 ft 4 in (1.93 m)	300 lb (140 kg)	Apr 6, 2020
Vinny Fiacable; OG	Recruit ratings: Scout: Rivals: 247Sports: ESPN:				
James Evans; P	Auckland, New Zealand	Sacred Heart College, Auckland	6 ft 1 in (1.85 m)	222 lb (101 kg)	May 17, 2020
James Evans; P	Recruit ratings: Scout: Rivals: 247Sports: ESPN:				
Donavan McCulley; QB	Indianapolis, Indiana	Lawrence North High School	6 ft 5 in (1.96 m)	195 lb (88 kg)	Dec 16, 2020
Donavan McCulley; QB	Recruit ratings: Scout: Rivals: 247Sports: ESPN:				
Jaquez Smith; WR	Atlanta, Georgia	Westlake High School	6 ft 1 in (1.85 m)	190 lb (86 kg)	Dec 16, 2020
Jaquez Smith; WR	Recruit ratings: Scout: Rivals: 247Sports: ESPN:				
Malachi Holt-Bennett; WR	Fairfield, Alabama	Fairfield Prep	6 ft 2 in (1.88 m)	180 lb (82 kg)	Feb 3, 2021
Malachi Holt-Bennett; WR	Recruit ratings: Scout: Rivals: 247Sports: ESPN:				
Larry Smith; S	Orange Park, Florida	Oakleaf High School	5 ft 10 in (1.78 m)	170 lb (77 kg)	Dec 16, 2020
Larry Smith; S	Recruit ratings: Scout: Rivals: 247Sports: ESPN:				
Aaron Steinfeldt; TE	Bloomington, Indiana	Bloomington High School North	6 ft 5 in (1.96 m)	230 lb (100 kg)	Dec 16, 2020
Aaron Steinfeldt; TE	Recruit ratings: Scout: Rivals: 247Sports: ESPN:				
Maurice Freeman; S	Chesapeake, Virginia	Oscar F. Smith High School	6 ft 0 in (1.83 m)	190 lb (86 kg)	Dec 16, 2020
Maurice Freeman; S	Recruit ratings: Scout: Rivals: 247Sports: ESPN:				
Trenten Howland; ATH	Joliet, Illinois	Joliet West High School	6 ft 2 in (1.88 m)	218 lb (99 kg)	Dec 16, 2020
Trenten Howland; ATH	Recruit ratings: Scout: Rivals: 247Sports: ESPN:				
David Holloman; RB	Auburn Hills, Michigan	Avondale High School	5 ft 11 in (1.80 m)	200 lb (91 kg)	Dec 16, 2020
David Holloman; RB	Recruit ratings: Scout: Rivals: 247Sports: ESPN:				
Jordan Grier; ATH	Ellenwood, Georgia	Cedar Grove High School	6 ft 185 in (6.53 m)	200 lb (91 kg)	Dec 16, 2020
Jordan Grier; ATH	Recruit ratings: Scout: Rivals: 247Sports: ESPN:				
Overall recruit ranking: Rivals: 48 247Sports: 58 ESPN: 55
Note: In many cases, Scout, Rivals, 247Sports, On3, and ESPN may conflict in their listings of height and weight.; In these cases, the average was taken. ESPN grades are on a 100-point scale.; Sources: "Indiana Football Commitments". Rivals.; "2021 Team Ranking". Rivals.com.

=== Preseason Big Ten poll ===
Although the Big Ten Conference has not held an official preseason poll since 2010, Cleveland.com has polled sports journalists representing all member schools as a de facto preseason media poll since 2011. For the 2021 poll, Indiana was projected to finish third in the East Division.

== Schedule ==
The Hoosiers' 2021 schedule consisted of six home games and six away games. The Hoosiers played three non-conference games, against Idaho and Cincinnati at home and on the road against Western Kentucky. In conference, Indiana hosted Rutgers, Ohio State, Michigan State, and Minnesota. They traveled to Iowa, Maryland, Michigan, Penn State, and Purdue.

Date	Time	Opponent	Rank	Site	TV	Result	Attendance
September 4	3:30 p.m.	at No. 18 Iowa	No. 17	Kinnick Stadium; Iowa City, IA	BTN	L 6–34	68,166
September 11	7:30 p.m.	Idaho*		Memorial Stadium; Bloomington, IN	BTN	W 56–14	47,417
September 18	12:00 p.m.	No. 8 Cincinnati*		Memorial Stadium; Bloomington, IN	ESPN	L 24–38	52,656
September 25	8:00 p.m.	at Western Kentucky*		Houchens Industries–L. T. Smith Stadium; Bowling Green, KY	CBSSN	W 33–31	25,171
October 2	7:30 p.m.	at No. 4 Penn State		Beaver Stadium; University Park, PA	ABC	L 0–24	105,951
October 16	12:00 p.m.	No. 10 Michigan State^{†}		Memorial Stadium; Bloomington, IN (rivalry)	FS1	L 15–20	50,571
October 23	7:30 p.m.	No. 5 Ohio State		Memorial Stadium; Bloomington, IN	ABC	L 7–54	52,656
October 30	12:00 p.m.	at Maryland		Maryland Stadium; College Park, MD	BTN	L 35–38	32,308
November 6	7:30 p.m.	at No. 7 Michigan		Michigan Stadium; Ann Arbor, MI	FOX	L 7–29	109,890
November 13	12:00 p.m.	Rutgers		Memorial Stadium; Bloomington, IN	BTN	L 3–38	40,171
November 20	3:30 p.m.	Minnesota		Memorial Stadium; Bloomington, IN	BTN	L 14–35	38,079
November 27	3:30 p.m.	at Purdue		Ross–Ade Stadium; West Lafayette, IN (Old Oaken Bucket)	FS1	L 7–44	61,320
*Non-conference game; ^{†}Homecoming; Rankings from AP Poll and CFP Rankings (after November 2) released prior to game; All times are in Eastern time

== Rankings ==
Ranking movements Legend: ██ Increase in ranking ██ Decrease in ranking — = Not ranked RV = Received votes
	Week																	
Poll	Pre	1	2	3	4	5	6	7	8	9	10	11	12	13	14	15	16	Final
AP	17	RV	RV	—	—	—	—	—	—	—	—	—	—	—	—			
Coaches	17	RV	RV	—	—	—	—	—	—	—	—	—	—	—	—			
CFP	Not released												—	—	—			Not released

== Game summaries ==
=== At No. 18 Iowa ===
No. 17 Indiana Hoosiers (0–0) at No. 18 Iowa Hawkeyes (0–0) – Game summary

Quarter	1	2	3	4	Total
No. 17 Hoosiers	3	0	3	0	6
No. 18 Hawkeyes	14	17	0	3	34

at Kinnick Stadium • Iowa City, IA

- Date: September 4, 2021
- Game time: 3:30 p.m.
- Game weather: Cloudy, 70 °F (21 °C)
- Game attendance: 68,166
- Referee: Larry Smith
- TV announcers (BTN): Brandon Gaudin (play-by-play), James Laurinaitis (analyst)
- Sources: IUHoosiers.com

Game information

First quarter

- (13:35) IOWA – Tyler Goodson 56-yard run Caleb Shudak kick (Drive: 4 plays, 67 yards, 1:25; Iowa 7–0)
- (12:45) IOWA– Riley Moss 30-yard interception return, Caleb Shudak kick (Drive: 3 plays, 4 yards, 0:50; Iowa 14–0)
- (4:28) IU – Charles Campbell 36-yard field goal (Drive: 9 plays, 49 yards, 3:44; Iowa 14–3)

Second quarter

- (11:54) IOWA – Spencer Petras 9-yard run; Caleb Shudak kick (Drive: 8 plays, 48 yards, 3:24; Iowa 21–3)
- (1:41) IOWA – Riley Moss 55-yard interception return, Caleb Shudak kick (Drive: 1 play, 0 yards, 0:09; Iowa 28–3)
- (0:00) IOWA – Caleb Shudak 41-yard field goal (Drive: 8 plays, 21 yards, 1:12; Iowa 31–3)

Third quarter

- (8:39) IU – Charles Campbell 41-yard field goal (Drive: 12 plays, 52 yards, 6:21; Iowa 31–6)

Fourth quarter

- (9:52) IOWA – Caleb Shudak 35-yard field goal (Drive: 11 plays, 40 yards, 5:55; Iowa 34–6)

Statistics	IU	IOWA
First downs	11	18
Total yards	233	303
Rushes/yards	31–77	36–158
Passing yards	156	145
Passing: Comp–Att–Int	14–33–3	13–28–0
Time of possession	32:04	27:56

Team	Category	Player	Statistics
Indiana	Passing	Michael Penix Jr.	14/31, 156 yards, 3 INT
Indiana	Rushing	Stephen Carr	19 carries, 57 yards
Indiana	Receiving	Ty Fryfogle	5 receptions, 84 yards
Iowa	Passing	Spencer Petras	13/27, 145 yards
Iowa	Rushing	Tyler Goodson	19 carries, 99 yards, TD
Iowa	Receiving	Sam LaPorta	5 receptions, 83 yards

=== vs Idaho ===
Idaho Vandals (1–0) vs Indiana Hoosiers (0–1) – Game summary

Quarter	1	2	3	4	Total
Vandals	0	7	7	0	14
Hoosiers	21	14	7	14	56

at Memorial Stadium • Bloomington, IN

- Date: September 11, 2021
- Game time: 7:40 p.m.
- Game weather: Sunny, 75 °F (24 °C)
- Game attendance: 47,417
- Referee: Mark Klucyznski
- TV announcers (BTN): Mark Followill (play-by-play), Matt Millen (analyst)
- Sources: IUHoosiers.com

Game information

First quarter

- (4:27) IU – Stephen Carr 2-yard run, Charles Campbell kick (Drive: 18 plays, 75 yards, 8:33; Indiana 7–0)
- (3:01) IU – Javon Swinton 9-yard pass from Michael Penix Jr., Charles Campbell kick (Drive: 2 plays, 13 yards, 0:39; Indiana 14–0)
- (2:02) IU – Javon Swinton 4-yard blocked punt return, Charles Campbell kick (Drive: 3 plays, -1 yards, 0:54; Indiana 21–0)

Second quarter

- (3:39) IU – Ty Fryfogle 9-yard pass from Michael Penix Jr., Charles Campbell kick (Drive: 12 plays, 83 yards, 6:32; Indiana 28–0)
- (1:49) IU – D. J. Matthews 81-yard punt return, Charles Campbell kick (Drive: 3 plays, -9 yards, 1:47; Indiana 35–0)
- (0:26) IDHO – Hayden Hatten 16-yard pass from Mike Beaudry, Logan Prescott kick (Drive: 8 plays, 75 yards, 1:21; Indiana 35–7)

Third quarter

- (13:14) IU – Michael Penix Jr. 1-yard run, Charles Campbell kick (Drive: 4 plays, 28 yards, 1:32; Indiana 42–7)
- (9:09) IDHO – Hayden Hatten 23-yard pass from Mike Beaudry, Logan Prescott kick (Drive: 11 plays, 75 yards, 4:03; Indiana 42–14)

Fourth quarter

- (13:02) IU – A. J. Barner 76-yard pass from Jack Tuttle, Chris Freeman kick (Drive: 4 plays, 88 yards, 1:34; Indiana 49–14)
- (9:56) IU – Davion Ervin-Poindexter 4-yard run, Chris Freeman kick (Drive: 4 plays, 32 yards, 1:11; Indiana 56–14)

Statistics	IDHO	IU
First downs	13	20
Total yards	261	338
Rushes/yards	22–65	50–179
Passing yards	196	159
Passing: Comp–Att–Int	23–39–0	13–20–0
Time of possession	26:36	33:24

Team	Category	Player	Statistics
Idaho	Passing	Mike Beaudry	23/36, 196 yards, 2 TD
Idaho	Rushing	Nick Romano	4 carries, 20 yards
Idaho	Receiving	Hayden Hatten	10 receptions, 94 yards, 2 TD
Indiana	Passing	Jack Tuttle	2/4, 91 yards, TD
Indiana	Rushing	Stephen Carr	22 carries, 118 yards, TD
Indiana	Receiving	A. J. Barner	1 reception, 76 yards, TD

=== vs No. 8 Cincinnati ===
No. 8 Cincinnati Bearcats (2–0) vs Indiana Hoosiers (1–1) – Game summary

Quarter	1	2	3	4	Total
No. 8 Bearcats	0	10	13	15	38
Hoosiers	7	7	10	0	24

at Memorial Stadium • Bloomington, IN

- Date: September 18, 2021
- Game time: 12:00 p.m.
- Game weather: Sunny, 89 °F (32 °C)
- Game attendance: 52,656
- Referee: Michael Cannon
- TV announcers (ESPN): Dave Pasch (play-by-play), Dusty Dvoracek (analyst), Tom Luginbill (sideline)
- Sources: IUHoosiers.com

Game information

First quarter

- (6:15) IU – Peyton Hendershot 16-yard pass from Michael Penix Jr., Charles Campbell kick (Drive: 6 plays, 50 yards, 2:22; Indiana 7–0)

Second quarter

- (5:06) IU – Stephen Carr 5-yard pass from Michael Penix Jr., Charles Campbell kick (Drive: 2 plays, 6 yards, 0:38; Indiana 14–0)
- (1:33) CIN – Jerome Ford 5-yard run, Cole Smith kick (Drive: 9 plays, 75 yards, 3:37; Indiana 14–7)
- (0:00) CIN – Cole Smith 32-yard field goal (Drive: 5 plays, 32 yards, 0:26; Indiana 14–10)

Third quarter

- IU 05:47 Jerome Ford 14 yd run; Cole Smith XP Good (UC 17–14)
- IU 03:52 D.J. Matthews 14 yd run; Charles Campbell XP Good (IU 21–17)
- UC 03:41 Tre Tucker 99 yd kickoff return; Cole Smith XP No Good (UC 23–21)
- IU 00:41 Charles Campbell 49 yd Field Goal (IU 24–23)
- (5:47) CIN – Jerome Ford 14-yard run, Cole Smith kick (Drive: 10 plays, 79 yards, 4:29; Cincinnati 17–14)
- (3:52) IU – D. J. Matthews 14-yard run, Charles Campbell kick (Drive: 5 plays, 75 yards, 1:53; Indiana 21–17)
- (3:41) CIN – Tre Tucker 99-yard kickoff return (Drive: 0 plays, 0 yards, 0:13; Cincinnati 23–21)
- (0:41) IU – Charles Campbell 49-yard field goal (Drive: 9 plays, 44 yards, 3:00; Indiana 24–23)

Fourth quarter

- (12:13) CIN – Alec Pierce 19-yard pass from Desmond Ridder, Cole Smith kick (Drive: 9 plays, 75 yards, 3:28; Cincinnati 30–24)
- (2:37) CIN – Desmond Ridder 7-yard run, Desmond Ridder two-point pass to Leonard Taylor (Drive: 3 plays, 6 yards, 0:54; Cincinnati 38–24)

Statistics	CIN	IU
First downs	20	20
Total yards	328	376
Rushes/yards	36–118	37–152
Passing yards	210	224
Passing: Comp–Att–Int	20–36–1	17–40–3
Time of possession	29:37	30:23

Team	Category	Player	Statistics
Cincinnati	Passing	Desmond Ridder	20/36, 210 yards, TD, INT
Cincinnati	Rushing	Jerome Ford	20 carries, 66 yards, 2 TD
Cincinnati	Receiving	Alec Pierce	5 receptions, 86 yards, TD
Indiana	Passing	Michael Penix Jr.	17/40, 224 yards, 2 TD, 3 INT
Indiana	Rushing	Stephen Carr	21 carries, 52 yards
Indiana	Receiving	D. J. Matthews	5 receptions, 120 yards

=== At Western Kentucky ===
Indiana Hoosiers (1–2) at Western Kentucky Hilltoppers (1–1) – Game summary

Quarter	1	2	3	4	Total
Hoosiers	14	9	3	7	33
Hilltoppers	0	14	10	7	31

at Houchens Industries–L. T. Smith Stadium • Bowling Green, KY

- Date: September 25, 2021
- Game time: 8:00 p.m.
- Game weather: Clear, 74 °F (23 °C)
- Game attendance: 25,171
- Referee: Kevin Randall
- TV announcers (CBS): Dave Ryan (play-by-play), Aaron Murray (analyst), Jenny Dell (sideline)
- Sources: IUHoosiers.com

Game information

First quarter

- (10:15) IU – Stephen Carr 1-yard run, Charles Campbell kick (Drive: 11 plays, 79 yards, 4:45; Indiana 7–0)
- (5:02) IU – Michael Penix Jr. 1-yard run, Charles Campbell kick (Drive: 11 plays, 81 yards, 4:50; Indiana 14–0)

Second quarter

- (14:27) WKU – Adam Cofield 1-yard run, Brayden Narveson kick (Drive: 15 plays, 77 yards, 5:29; Indiana 14–7)
- (9:49) IU – Charles Campbell 46-yard field goal (Drive: 13 plays, 46 yards, 4:34; Indiana 17–7)
- (2:42) IU – Charles Campbell 37-yard field goal (Drive: 13 plays, 56 yards, 4:55; Indiana 20–7)
- (0:55) WKU – Daewood Davis 25-yard pass from Bailey Zappe, Brayden Narveson kick (Drive: 7 plays, 72 yards, 1:42; Indiana 20–14)
- (0:00) IU – Charles Campbell 25-yard field goal (Drive: 8 plays, 68 yards, 0:55; Indiana 23–14)

Third quarter

- (13:13) WKU – Matthew Smith 13-yard pass from Bailey Zappe, Brayden Narveson kick (Drive: 5 plays, 76 yards, 1:40; Indiana 23–21)
- (9:10) IU – Charles Campbell 25-yard field goal (Drive: 9 plays, 44 yards, 4:03; Indiana 26–21)
- (5:53) WKU – Brayden Narveson 34-yard field goal (Drive: 11 plays, 59 yards, 3:17; Indiana 26–24)

Fourth quarter

- (4:27) IU – Stephen Carr 1-yard run, Charles Campbell kick (Drive: 14 plays, 86 yards, 6:19; Indiana 33–24)
- (2:43) WKU – Malachi Corley 19-yard pass from Bailey Zappe, Brayden Narveson kick (Drive: 8 plays, 75 yards, 1:44; Indiana 33–31)

Statistics	IU	WKU
First downs	35	24
Total yards	507	458
Rushes/yards	39–134	20–93
Passing yards	373	365
Passing: Comp–Att–Int	35–53–0	31–44–0
Time of possession	38:34	21:26

Team	Category	Player	Statistics
Indiana	Passing	Michael Penix Jr.	35/53, 373 yards
Indiana	Rushing	Stephen Carr	25 carries, 109 yards, 2 TD
Indiana	Receiving	Peyton Hendershot	7 receptions, 100 yards
Western Kentucky	Passing	Bailey Zappe	31/44, 365 yards, 3 TD
Western Kentucky	Rushing	Noah Whittington	6 carries, 41 yards
Western Kentucky	Receiving	Jerreth Sterns	7 receptions, 82 yards

=== At No. 4 Penn State ===
Indiana Hoosiers (2–2) at No. 4 Penn State Nittany Lions (4–0) – Game summary

Quarter	1	2	3	4	Total
Hoosiers	0	0	0	0	0
No. 4 Nittany Lions	7	7	7	3	24

at Beaver Stadium • University Park, PA

- Date: October 2, 2021
- Game time: 7:30 p.m.
- Game weather: Cloudy, 75 °F (24 °C)
- Game attendance: 105,951
- Referee: Ron Snodgrass
- TV announcers (ABC): Sean McDonough (play-by-play), Todd Blackledge (analyst), Molly McGrath (sideline)
- Sources: IUHoosiers.com

Game information

First quarter

- (5:28) PSU – Brenton Strange 10-yard pass from Sean Clifford, Jordan Stout kick (Drive: 13 plays, 80 yards, 5:14; Penn State 7–0)

Second quarter

- (13:31) PSU – Jahan Dotson 8-yard pass from Sean Clifford, Jordan Stout kick (Drive: 9 plays, 96 yards, 3:42; Penn State 14–0)

Third quarter

- (4:16) PSU – Jahan Dotson 30-yard pass from Sean Clifford, Jordan Stout kick (Drive: 9 plays, 61 yards, 5:22; Penn State 21–0)

Fourth quarter

- (8:06) PSU – Jordan Stout 50-yard field goal (Drive: 4 plays, 0 yards, 0:42; Penn State 24–0)

Statistics	IU	PSU
First downs	12	20
Total yards	264	408
Rushes/yards	24–69	42–209
Passing yards	195	199
Passing: Comp–Att–Int	16–34–2	18–34–1
Time of possession	25:07	34:53

Team	Category	Player	Statistics
Indiana	Passing	Michael Penix Jr.	10/22, 118 yards, INT
Indiana	Rushing	Stephen Carr	15 carries, 50 yards
Indiana	Receiving	Peyton Hendershot	5 receptions, 88 yards
Penn State	Passing	Sean Clifford	17/33, 178 yards, 3 TD, INT
Penn State	Rushing	Keyvone Lee	8 carries, 74 yards
Penn State	Receiving	Jahan Dotson	8 receptions, 84 yards, 2 TD

=== vs No. 10 Michigan State ===
No. 10 Michigan State Spartans (6–0) vs Indiana Hoosiers (2–3) – Game summary

Quarter	1	2	3	4	Total
No. 10 Spartans	7	0	10	3	20
Hoosiers	3	6	0	6	15

at Memorial Stadium • Bloomington, IN

- Date: October 16, 2021
- Game time: 12:00 p.m.
- Game weather: Sunny, 62 °F (17 °C)
- Game attendance: 50,571
- Referee: John O'Neill
- TV announcers (FS1): Aaron Goldsmith (play-by-play), Brock Huard (analyst)

Game information

First quarter

- (8:02) IU – Charles Campbell 24-yard field goal (Drive: 13 plays, 70 yards, 5:01; Indiana 3–0)
- (4:33) MSU – Cal Haladay 30-yard interception return, Matt Coghlin kick (Drive: 3 plays, 2 yards, 1:16; Michigan State 7–3)

Second quarter

- (14:21) IU – Charles Campbell 44-yard field goal (Drive: 6 plays, 17 yards, 2:27; Michigan State 7–6)
- (6:55) IU – Charles Campbell 25-yard field goal (Drive: 12 plays, 71 yards, 5:33; Indiana 9–7)

Third quarter

- (7:54) MSU – Matt Coghlin 51-yard field goal (Drive: 9 plays, 46 yards, 4:04; Michigan State 10–9)
- (1:49) MSU – Tyler Hunt 12-yard pass from Payton Thorne, Matt Coghlin kick (Drive: 5 plays, 39 yards, 1:35; Michigan State 17–9)

Fourth quarter

- (12:56) IU – Stephen Carr 1-yard run (Drive: 11 plays, 75 yards, 3:53; Michigan State 17–15)
- (8:31) MSU – Matt Coghlin 49-yard field goal (Drive: 13 plays, 60 yards, 4:18; Michigan State 20–15)

Statistics	MSU	IU
First downs	14	23
Total yards	241	322
Rushes/yards	35–100	36–134
Passing yards	141	188
Passing: Comp–Att–Int	15–27–2	28–52–2
Time of possession	26:30	33:30

Team	Category	Player	Statistics
Michigan State	Passing	Payton Thorne	14/26, 126 yards, TD, 2 INT
Michigan State	Rushing	Kenneth Walker III	23 carries, 84 yards
Michigan State	Receiving	Jayden Reed	4 receptions, 70 yards
Indiana	Passing	Jack Tuttle	28/52, 188 yards, 2 INT
Indiana	Rushing	Stephen Carr	19 carries, 53 yards, TD
Indiana	Receiving	Ty Fryfogle	7 receptions, 65 yards

=== vs No. 5 Ohio State ===
No. 5 Ohio State Buckeyes (5–1) vs Indiana Hoosiers (2–4) – Game summary

Quarter	1	2	3	4	Total
No. 5 Buckeyes	14	30	7	3	54
Hoosiers	7	0	0	0	7

at Memorial Stadium • Bloomington, IN

- Date: October 23, 2021
- Game time: 6:44 p.m.
- Game weather: Rainy, 61 °F (16 °C)
- Game attendance: 52,656
- Referee: Larry Smith
- TV announcers (ABC): Dave Pasch (play-by-play), Dusty Dvoracek (analyst), Tom Luginbill (sideline)

Game information

First quarter

- (9:50) OSU – Miyan Williams 9-yard run, Noah Ruggles kick (Drive: 12 plays, 75 yards, 5:10; Ohio State 7–0)
- (2:58) IU – Peyton Hendershot 7-yard pass from Jack Tuttle, Charles Campbell kick (Drive: 15 plays, 75 yards, 6:52; Tied 7–7)
- (1:25) OSU – TreVeyon Henderson 21-yard run, Noah Ruggles kick (Drive: 5 plays, 75 yards, 1:33; Ohio State 14–7)

Second quarter

- (12:47) OSU – TreVeyon Henderson 14-yard pass from C. J. Stroud, Noah Ruggles kick (Drive: 6 plays, 51 yards, 2:43; Ohio State 21–7)
- (10:11) OSU – Team safety (Drive: 4 plays, -22 yards, 2:36; Ohio State 23–7)
- (8:24) OSU – Chris Olave 16-yard pass from C. J. Stroud, Noah Ruggles kick (Drive: 5 plays, 39 yards, 1:47; Ohio State 30–7)
- (5:45) OSU – TreVeyon Henderson 6-yard run., Noah Ruggles kick (Drive: 2 plays, 30 yards, 0:29; Ohio State 37–7)
- (0:31) OSU – Jeremy Ruckert 14-yard pass from C. J. Stroud, Noah Ruggles kick (Drive: 8 plays, 66 yards, 2:56; Ohio State 44–7)

Third quarter

- (1:15) OSU – Jeremy Ruckert 2-yard pass from C. J. Stroud, Noah Ruggles kick (Drive: 10 plays, 78 yards, 5:04; Ohio State 51–7)

Fourth quarter

- (8:49) OSU – Noah Ruggles 26-yard field goal (Drive: 11 plays, 67 yards, 5:53; Ohio State 54–7)

Statistics	OSU	IU
First downs	31	10
Total yards	539	128
Rushes/yards	32–187	37–48
Passing yards	352	80
Passing: Comp–Att–Int	28–37–0	8–17–0
Time of possession	32:01	27:59

Team	Category	Player	Statistics
Ohio State	Passing	C. J. Stroud	21/28, 266 yards, 4 TD
Ohio State	Rushing	TreVeyon Henderson	9 carries, 81 yards, 2 TD
Ohio State	Receiving	Jaxon Smith-Njigba	6 receptions, 99 yards
Indiana	Passing	Jack Tuttle	4/7, 41 yards, TD
Indiana	Rushing	Trent Howland	5 carries, 17 yards
Indiana	Receiving	Peyton Hendershot	5 receptions, 35 yards, TD

=== At Maryland ===
Indiana Hoosiers (2–5) at Maryland Terrapins (4–3) – Game summary

Quarter	1	2	3	4	Total
Hoosiers	0	10	7	18	35
Terrapins	14	0	14	10	38

at Maryland Stadium • College Park, MD

- Date: October 30, 2021
- Game time: 12:00 p.m.
- Game weather: Cloudy, 62 °F (17 °C)
- Game attendance: 32,308
- Referee: Reggie Smith
- TV announcers (FOX): Chris Vosters (play-by-play), Matt Millen (analyst)

Game information

First quarter

- (11:00) MARY – Tayon Fleet-Davis 1-yard run, Joseph Petrino kick (Drive: 7 plays, 35 yards, 2:34; Maryland 7–0)
- (3:55) MARY – Challen Faamatau 1-yard run, Joseph Petrino kick (Drive: 9 plays, 90 yards, 3:25; Maryland 14–0)

Second quarter

- (13:42) IU – Stephen Carr 1-yard run, Charles Campbell kick (Drive: 7 plays, 77 yards, 2:18; Maryland 14–7)
- (0:08) IU – Charles Campbell 55-yard field goal (Drive: 9 plays, 35 yards, 1:51; Maryland 14–10)

Third quarter

- (11:12) IU – Stephen Carr 66-yard run, Charles Campbell kick (Drive: 5 plays, 86 yards, 1:47; Indiana 17–14)
- (8:34) MARY – Challen Caamatau 1-yard run, Joseph Petrino kick (Drive: 7 plays, 75 yards, 2:38; Maryland 21–17)
- (4:04) MARY – Carlos Carriere 14-yard pass from Taulia Tagovailoa, Joseph Petrino kick (Drive: 8 plays, 67 yards, 2:58; Maryland 28–17)

Fourth quarter

- (14:12) IU – Charles Campbell 29-yard field goal (Drive: 11 plays, 67 yards, 4:46; Maryland 28–20)
- (12:12) MARY – Carlos Carriere 45-yard pass from Taulia Tagovailoa, Joseph Petrino kick (Drive: 6 plays, 68 yards, 1:51; Maryland 35–20)
- (9:28) IU – Peyton Hendershot 16-yard pass from Donaven McCulley, Donaven McCulley two-point pass to Peyton Hendershot (Drive: 6 plays, 75 yards, 2:44; Maryland 35–28)
- (1:20) MARY – Joseph Petrino 41-yard field goal (Drive: 12 plays, 36 yards, 5:16; Maryland 38–28)
- (1:00) IU – Peyton Hendershot 8-yard pass from Donaven McCulley, Charles Campbell kick (Drive: 2 plays, 75 yards, 0:20; Maryland 38–35)

Statistics	IU	MARY
First downs	17	30
Total yards	446	498
Rushes/yards	42–204	46–79
Passing yards	242	419
Passing: Comp–Att–Int	14–25–0	26–40–0
Time of possession	27:58	32:02

Team	Category	Player	Statistics
Indiana	Passing	Donaven McCulley	14/25, 242 yards, 2 TD
Indiana	Rushing	Stephen Carr	21 carries, 136 yards, 2 TD
Indiana	Receiving	Peyton Hendershot	6 receptions, 106 yards, 2 TD
Maryland	Passing	Taulia Tagovailoa	26/40, 419 yards, 2 TD
Maryland	Rushing	Challen Faamatau	21 carries, 44 yards, 2 TD
Maryland	Receiving	Carlos Carriere	8 receptions, 134 yards, 2 TD

=== At No. 7 Michigan ===
Indiana Hoosiers (2–6) at No. 7 Michigan Wolverines (7–1) – Game summary

Quarter	1	2	3	4	Total
Hoosiers	0	7	0	0	7
No. 7 Wolverines	3	14	6	6	29

at Michigan Stadium • Ann Arbor, MI

- Date: November 6, 2021
- Game time: 7:30 p.m.
- Game weather: Sunny, 35 °F (2 °C)
- Game attendance: 109,890
- Referee: Jerry McGinn
- TV announcers (FOX): Joe Davis (play-by-play), Brock Huard (analyst)

Game information

First quarter

- (0:00) MICH – Jake Moody 34-yard field goal (Drive: 15 plays, 63 yards, 6:36; Michigan 3–0)

Second quarter

- (12:35) MICH – Hassan Haskins 2-yard run, Jake Moody kick (Drive: 4 plays, 24 yards, 1:18; Michigan 10–0)
- (8:18) IU – Chris Childers 1-yard run, Charles Campbell kick (Drive: 10 plays, 75 yards, 4:17; Michigan 10–7)
- (6:28) MICH – Luke Schoonmaker 12-yard pass from Cade McNamara, Jake Moody kick (Drive: 4 plays, 75 yards, 1:50; Michigan 17–7)

Third quarter

- (5:44) MICH – Jake Moody 32-yard field goal (Drive: 11 plays, 62 yards, 5:43; Michigan 20–7)
- (1:17) MICH – Jake Moody 34-yard field goal (Drive: 8 plays, 33 yards, 2:56; Michigan 23–7)

Fourth quarter

- (13:39) MICH – Luke Schoonmaker 8-yard pass from Cade McNamara (Drive: 3 plays, 60 yards, 1:08; Michigan 29–7)

Statistics	IU	MICH
First downs	11	19
Total yards	195	411
Rushes/yards	35–107	38–188
Passing yards	88	223
Passing: Comp–Att–Int	10–25–0	15–28–1
Time of possession	27:24	32:36

Team	Category	Player	Statistics
Indiana	Passing	Donaven McCulley	10/24, 88 yards
Indiana	Rushing	Donaven McCulley	14 carries, 37 yards
Indiana	Receiving	Peyton Hendershot	3 receptions, 34 yards
Michigan	Passing	Cade McNamara	10/18, 168 yards, 2 TD
Michigan	Rushing	Hassan Haskins	27 carries, 168 yards, TD
Michigan	Receiving	Cornelius Johnson	5 receptions, 108 yards

=== vs Rutgers ===
Rutgers Scarlet Knights (4–5) vs Indiana Hoosiers (2–7) – Game summary

Quarter	1	2	3	4	Total
Scarlet Knights	14	3	14	7	38
Hoosiers	0	3	0	0	3

at Memorial Stadium • Bloomington, IN

- Date: November 13, 2021
- Game time: 12:00 p.m.
- Game weather: Cloudy, 38 °F (3 °C)
- Game attendance: 40,171
- Referee: Mark Kluczynski
- TV announcers (BTN): Cory Provus (play-by-play), Matt Millen (analyst)

Game information

First quarter

- (13:47) RUTG – Isiah Pacheco 8-yard run, Valentino Ambrosio kick (Drive: 4 plays, 21 yards, 1:07; Rutgers 7–0)
- (3:21) RUTG – Isiah Pacheco 3-yard run, Valentino Ambrosio kick (Drive: 9 plays, 70 yards, 3:13; Rutgers 14–0)

Second quarter

- (14:10) RUTG – Valentino Ambrosio 38-yard field goal (Drive: 4 plays, 4 yards, 1:00; Rutgers 17–0)
- (0:02) IU – Charles Campbell 47-yard field goal (Drive: 7 plays, 61 yards, 0:55; Rutgers 17–3)

Third quarter

- (12:27) RUTG – Aaron Young 10-yard run, Valentino Ambrosio kick (Drive: 1 plays, 10 yards, 0:08; Rutgers 24–3)
- (0:32) RUTG – Raiqwon O'Neal 10-yard run, Valentino Ambrosio kick (Drive: 4 plays, 39 yards, 1:39; Rutgers 31–3)

Fourth quarter

- (7:00) RUTG – Noah Vedral 9-yard run, Valentino Ambrosio kick (Drive: 13 plays, 53 yards, 8:00; Rutgers 38–3)

Statistics	RUTG	IU
First downs	18	18
Total yards	320	259
Rushes/yards	50–218	32–82
Passing yards	102	177
Passing: Comp–Att–Int	10–19–0	18–42–2
Time of possession	32:09	27:51

Team	Category	Player	Statistics
Rutgers	Passing	Noah Vedral	9/17, 97 yards
Rutgers	Rushing	Isiah Pacheco	21 carries, 79 yards, 2 TD
Rutgers	Receiving	Bo Melton	5 receptions, 50 yards
Indiana	Passing	Donaven McCulley	7/20, 98 yards
Indiana	Rushing	Charlie Spegal	5 carries, 14 yards
Indiana	Receiving	Ty Fryfogle	5 receptions, 51 yards

=== vs Minnesota ===
Minnesota Golden Gophers (6–4) vs Indiana Hoosiers (2–8) – Game summary

Quarter	1	2	3	4	Total
Golden Gophers	0	21	7	7	35
Hoosiers	7	0	0	7	14

at Memorial Stadium • Bloomington, IN

- Date: November 20, 2021
- Game time: 3:30 p.m.
- Game weather: Sunny, 52 °F (11 °C)
- Game attendance: 38,079
- Referee: Michael Cannon
- TV announcers (BTN): Chris Vosters (play-by-play), Jeremy Leman (analyst)

Game information

First quarter

- (0:17) IU – Donaven McCulley 11-yard run, Charles Campbell kick (Drive: 14 plays, 92 yards, 6:24; Indiana 7–0)

Second quarter

- (6:04) MINN – Ky Thomas 2-yard run, Matthew Trickett kick (Drive: 12 plays, 68 yards, 6:02; Tied 7–7)
- (0:46) MINN – Ky Thomas 1-yard run, Matthew Trickett kick (Drive: 6 plays, 66 yards, 3:04; Minnesota 14–7)
- (0:09) MINN – Chris Autman-Bell 14-yard pass from Tanner Morgan, Matthew Trickett kick (Drive: 3 plays, 31 yards, 0:14; Minnesota 21–7)

Third quarter

- (2:28) MINN – Chris Autman-Bell 9-yard pass from Tanner Morgan, Matthew Trickett kick (Drive: 8 plays, 56 yards, 4:19; Minnesota 28–7)

Fourth quarter

- (3:41) MINN – Bucky Irving 3-yard run, Matthew Trickett kick (Drive: 7 plays, 46 yards, 4:16; Minnesota 35–7)
- (0:22) IU – Malachi Holt-Bennett 29-yard pass from Grant Gremel, Charles Campbell kick (Drive: 7 plays, 69 yards, 3:13; Minnesota 35–14)

Statistics	MINN	IU
First downs	20	12
Total yards	391	218
Rushes/yards	48–195	33–141
Passing yards	196	77
Passing: Comp–Att–Int	14–20–0	8–19–2
Time of possession	36:43	23:17

Team	Category	Player	Statistics
Minnesota	Passing	Tanner Morgan	14/20, 196 yards, 2 TD
Minnesota	Rushing	Ky Thomas	26 carries, 105 yards, 2 TD
Minnesota	Receiving	Brevyn Spann-Ford	3 receptions, 67 yards
Indiana	Passing	Grant Gremel	5/12, 60 yards, TD
Indiana	Rushing	Donaven McCulley	15 carries, 68 yards, TD
Indiana	Receiving	A. J. Barner	3 receptions, 31 yards

=== At Purdue ===
Indiana Hoosiers (2–9) at Purdue Boilermakers (7–4) – Game summary

Quarter	1	2	3	4	Total
Hoosiers	7	0	0	0	7
Boilermakers	7	10	14	13	44

at Ross–Ade Stadium • West Lafayette, IN

- Date: November 27, 2021
- Game time: 3:30 p.m.
- Game weather: Sunny, 39 °F (4 °C)
- Game attendance: 61,320
- Referee: Jerry McGinn
- TV announcers (FS1): Chris Vosters (play-by-play), Devin Gardner (analyst)

Game information

First quarter

- (8:30) PUR – Zander Horvath 1-yard run, Mitchell Fineran kick (Drive: 13 plays, 75 yards, 6:30; Purdue 7–0)
- (3:38) IU – Donaven McCulley 2-yard run, Charles Campbell kick (Drive: 11 plays, 75 yards, 4:52; Tied 7–7)

Second quarter

- (12:42) PUR – Paul Piferi 24-yard pass from Aidan O'Connell, Charles Campbell kick (Drive: 3 plays, 42 yards, 1:26; Purdue 14–7)
- (6:53) PUR – Mitchell Fineran 32-yard field goal (Drive: 9 plays, 54 yards, 4:09; Purdue 17–7)

Third quarter

- (12:26) PUR – Jackson Anthrop 21-yard pass from Aidan O'Connell, Mitchell Fineran kick (Drive: 4 plays, 51 yards, 1:24; Purdue 24–7)
- (8:37) PUR – T. J. Sheffield 5-yard pass from Aidan O'Connell, Mitchell Fineran kick (Drive: 6 plays, 69 yards, 2:12; Purdue 31–7)

Fourth quarter

- (13:53) PUR – David Bell 20-yard pass from Aidan O'Connell (Drive: 12 plays, 65 yards, 5:11; Purdue 37–7)
- (9:28) PUR – Dylan Dowling 33-yard run, Mitchell Fineran kick (Drive: 4 plays, 46 yards, 2:09; Purdue 44–7)

Statistics	IU	PUR
First downs	17	25
Total yards	204	447
Rushes/yards	32–57	28–167
Passing yards	147	280
Passing: Comp–Att–Int	18–30–0	27–33–0
Time of possession	30:46	29:14

Team	Category	Player	Statistics
Indiana	Passing	Grant Gremel	18/30, 147 yards, INT
Indiana	Rushing	Davion Ervin-Poindexter	8 carries, 47 yards
Indiana	Receiving	Peyton Hendershot	6 receptions, 51 yards
Purdue	Passing	Aidan O'Connell	26/31, 278 yards, 4 TD
Purdue	Rushing	Zander Horvath	15 carries, 49 yards, TD
Purdue	Receiving	David Bell	6 receptions, 79 yards, TD

== Roster ==
2021 Indiana Hoosiers football team roster
Players
Coaches
Offense

Pos.	#	Name	Class
QB	0	Donaven McCulley	Fr
WR	1	Camron Buckley	Sr
WR	2	Jacolby Hewitt	Jr
WR	3	Ty Fryfogle	Sr
WR	4	David Baker	Fr
RB	5	Stephen Carr	Sr
QB	5	Dexter Williams II	Fr
WR	7	D.J. Matthews	Sr
WR	8	Jaquez Smith	Fr
QB	9	Michael Penix Jr.	Jr
RB	10	David Ellis	Jr
WR	12	Da'Shaun Brown	So
WR	13	Miles Marshall	Jr
QB	14	Jack Tuttle	Jr
QB	15	Zack Merrill	So
QB	16	Grant Gremel	So
WR	17	Jordyn Williams	Fr
WR	18	Javon Swinton	So
WR	19	Malachi Holt-Bennett	Fr
RB	20	Tim Baldwin Jr.	So
RB	22	Davion Ervin-Poindexter	Jr
RB	23	Trent Howland	Fr
QB	25	Will Jontz	So
RB	28	Charlie Spegal	Fr
RB	33	David Holloman	Fr
RB	36	Chris Childers	Jr
TE	39	Ryan Barnes	Jr
TE	45	Trey Walker	So
TE	49	Sam Daugstrup	Fr
OL	50	Zach Carpenter	So
OL	51	Mackenzie Nworah	Sr
OL	52	Joshua Sales Jr.	Fr
OL	53	Vinny Fiacable	Fr
OL	54	Brady Feeney	Fr
OL	55	Luke Lane	So
OL	56	Mike Katic	So
OL	58	Chris Bradberry	Sr
OL	61	Ricky Tamis	So
OL	62	Cameron Knight	Fr
OL	63	Andy Buttrell	Fr
OL	66	Aidan Rafferty	Jr
OL	67	Kahlil Benson	Fr
OL	69	Peter Schulz	So
OL	70	Luke Haggard	Sr
OL	71	Randy Holtz	Fr
OL	72	Dylan Powell	Sr
OL	73	Tim Weaver	So
OL	74	Nick Marozas	Jr
OL	75	Luke Wiginton	Fr
OL	76	Matthew Bedford	Jr
OL	77	Caleb Jones	Sr
OL	79	Charlie O'Connor	Jr
WR	82	Christian Harris	Sr
TE	84	Aaron Steinfeldt	Fr
WR	85	McCall Ray	So
TE	85	Khameron Taylor	Sr
TE	86	Peyton Hendershot	Sr
TE	88	AJ Barner	So
TE	89	Matt Bjorson	Sr

Defense

Pos.	#	Name	Class
DB	0	Raheem Layne	Sr
DB	1	Devon Matthews	Sr
DB	2	Reese Taylor	Sr
DB	3	Tiawan Mullen	Jr
DB	4	Cam Jones	Sr
DB	5	Juwan Burgess	Sr
DL	6	James Head Jr.	Sr
DB	7	Christopher Keys	Fr
LB	8	James Miller	Jr
DB	9	Marcelino McCrary-Ball	Sr
DL	10	Ryder Anderson	Sr
DB	12	Lem Watley-Neely	Fr
DL	13	Jaren Handy	Jr
DB	14	Larry Tracy III	So
DB	15	Larry Smith III	Fr
DB	16	Jordan Grier	Fr
DL	18	Jonathan King	Jr
DB	19	Josh Sanguinetti	So
DB	20	Joseph Daniels Jr.	Jr
DB	21	Noah Pierre	Jr
LB	22	Maurice Freeman	Fr
DB	23	Jaylin Williams	Sr
DB	24	Bryson Bonds	So
DB	25	Deland McCullough II	So
DB	26	Gabe Cohen	Sr
LB	27	Xavier Trueblood	Fr
DB	29	Liam Zaccheo	Fr
DB	30	Jordan Jusevitch	Jr
DB	31	Bryant Fitzgerald	Jr
DB	33	Connor Hole	Fr
DB	35	DeKaleb Thomas	Jr
DB	36	Nicholas Grieser	So
LB	37	Ty Wise	Fr
DB	39	Patrick Finley	Fr
LB	40	Cameron Williams	So
DL	41	Beau Robbins	So
OLB	42	D. K. Bonhomme	Jr
LB	44	Thomas Allen	Sr
LB	46	Aaron Casey	Jr
LB	47	Micah McFadden	Sr
LB	49	Brett Wethington	Fr
DL	50	Sio Nofoagatoto'a	Jr
DL	52	Shamar Jones	Jr
DL	55	C.J. Person	So
DL	59	Gavin McCabe	Jr
DL	60	Dalton Davis	So
DL	67	Christian Love	Jr
OLB	87	Michael Ziemba	Sr
OLB	92	Alfred Bryant	Sr
DL	94	DeMarcus Elliott	Sr
DL	95	Antoine Whitner Jr.	So
DL	96	Caleb Murphy	Fr
DL	98	Cooper Jones	Fr
DL	99	Weston Kramer	Sr

Special teams

Pos.	#	Name	Class
K	80	Chris Freeman	Fr
P	83	Asher King	So
K	90	Jared Smolar	Sr
P	92	Chase Wyatt	So
K	93	Charles Campbell	Jr
P	94	James Evans	Fr
LS	95	Sean Wracher	Jr
LS	97	Jake Wellmann	Fr

Head coach

- Tom Allen

Coordinators/assistant coaches

- Deland McCullough (assistant head coach / running backs)
- Grant Heard (co-offensive coordinator / wide receivers)
- Darren Hiller (run game coordinator / offensive Line)
- Jason Jones (safeties)
- Kevin Peoples (defensive line)
- Brandon Shelby (assistant head coach / cornerbacks)
- Nick Sheridan (offensive coordinator / quarterbacks)
- Kasey Teegardin (special teams coordinator / outside linebackers)
- Charlton Warren (defensive coordinator/linebackers)
- Kevin Wright (tight ends)

Legend

- (C) Team captain
- (S) Suspended
- (I) Ineligible
- Injured
- Redshirt

Roster
Last update: July 21, 2021

== Awards and honors ==
=== Award watch lists ===
Listed in the order that they were released

Award	Player	Position	Year	Date Awarded	Ref
Walter Camp 2021 Preseason All-American - Second Team	Micah McFadden	LB	SR	June 17, 2021	
Bobby Dodd Coach of the Year Award	Tom Allen	Head coach		July 14, 2021	
Chuck Bednarik Award	Micah McFadden	LB	SR	July 19, 2021	
Chuck Bednarik Award	Tiawan Mullen	CB	JR	July 19, 2021	
Maxwell Award	Michael Penix Jr.	QB	JR (RS)	July 19, 2021	
Maxwell Award	Ty Fryfogle	WR	SR	July 19, 2021	
Davey O’Brien Award	Michael Penix Jr.	QB	JR (RS)	July 20, 2021	
Doak Walker Award	Stephen Carr	RB	SR (RS)	July 21, 2021	
Fred Biletnikoff Award	Ty Fryfogle	WR	SR	July 22, 2021	
John Mackey Award	Peyton Hendershot	TE	SR (RS)	July 23, 2021	
Jim Thorpe Award	Tiawan Mullen	CB	JR	July 26, 2021	
Butkus Award	Micah McFadden	LB	SR	July 26, 2021	
Bronko Nagurski Trophy	Micah McFadden	LB	SR	July 27, 2021	
Bronko Nagurski Trophy	Tiawan Mullen	CB	JR	July 27, 2021	
Outland Trophy	Matthew Bedford	OL	JR	July 27, 2021	
Lou Groza Award	Charles Campbell	K	JR (RS)	July 28, 2021	
Wuerffel Trophy	Michael Ziemba	OL	SR	July 29, 2021	
Paul Hornung Award	DJ Matthews Jr.	WR / RS	SR (RS)	July 29, 2021	
Walter Camp Award	Michael Penix Jr.	QB	JR (RS)	July 30, 2021	
Manning Award	Michael Penix Jr.	QB	JR (RS)	August 5, 2021	
Lombardi Award	Michah McFadden	LB	SR	August 6, 2021	
Earl Campbell Tyler Rose Award	Camron Buckley	WR	SR (RS)	August 6, 2021	
Johnny Unitas Golden Arm Award	Michael Penix Jr.	QB	JR (RS)	August 19, 2021	

== Radio ==
Radio coverage for all games will be broadcast on IUHoosiers.com All-Access and on various radio frequencies throughout the state. The primary radio announcer is long-time broadcaster Don Fischer with Play-by-Play.
