= 2020 Indiana Hoosiers football team =

American college football season

2020 Indiana Hoosiers football

Outback Bowl, L 20–26 vs. Ole Miss
- Conference: Big Ten Conference
- East Division

Ranking
- Coaches: No. 13
- AP: No. 12
- Record: 6–2 (6–1 Big Ten)
- Head coach: Tom Allen (4th season)
- Offensive coordinator: Nick Sheridan (1st season)
- Co-offensive coordinator: Grant Heard (1st season)
- Offensive scheme: Spread
- Defensive coordinator: Kane Wommack (2nd season)
- Co-defensive coordinator: Kevin Peoples (1st season)
- Base defense: Multiple 4–2–5
- MVPs: Micah McFadden; Michael Penix Jr.
- Captains: Harry Crider; Cam Jones; Marcelino McCrary-Ball; Micah McFadden; Michael Penix Jr.
- Home stadium: Memorial Stadium

Uniform
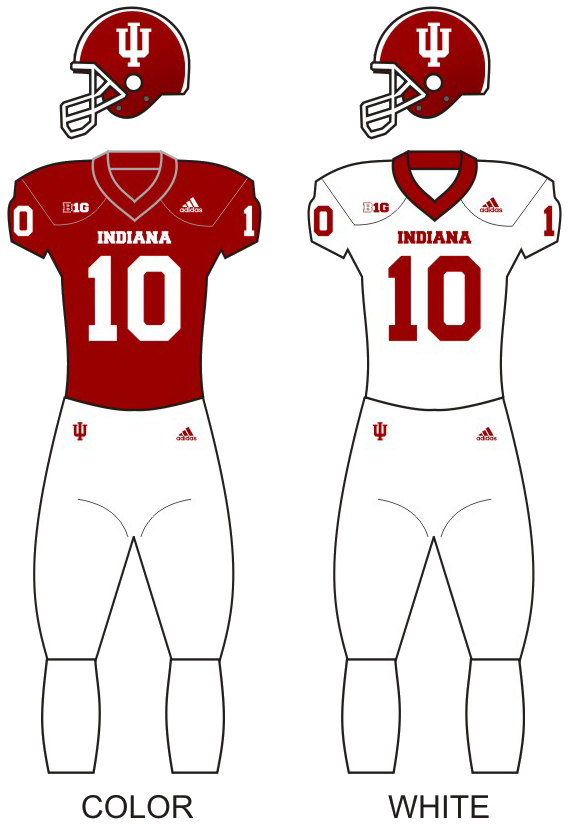

2020 Big Ten Conference football standings
	Conf.			Overall
Team	W		L	W		L
East Division
No. 2 Ohio State xy$^	5	–	0	7	–	1
No. 12 Indiana	6	–	1	6	–	2
Penn State	4	–	5	4	–	5
Maryland	2	–	3	2	–	3
Rutgers	3	–	6	3	–	6
Michigan	2	–	4	2	–	4
Michigan State	2	–	5	2	–	5
West Division
No. 10 Northwestern xy	6	–	1	7	–	2
No. 16 Iowa	6	–	2	6	–	2
Wisconsin	3	–	3	4	–	3
Minnesota	3	–	4	3	–	4
Nebraska	3	–	5	3	–	5
Purdue	2	–	4	2	–	4
Illinois	2	–	6	2	–	6
Championship: Ohio State 22, Northwestern 10
^ – College Football Playoff participant; $ – Conference champion; x – Division champion/co-champions; y – Championship game participant; Note: Due to COVID-19, the Big Ten suspended the season on August 11, but later decided to begin play on October 24. In addition to the title game that was played on December 19, the conference seeded all remaining teams for "championship week" games.; Rankings from AP Poll.

The 2020 Indiana Hoosiers football team represented Indiana University in the 2020 NCAA Division I FBS football season. The Hoosiers played their home games at Memorial Stadium in Bloomington, Indiana, and competed as a member of the East Division of the Big Ten Conference. The team was led by fourth-year head coach Tom Allen.

On July 9, 2020, the Big Ten announced that member teams would only play conference games in effort to reduce issues related to the COVID-19 pandemic. On August 11, the Big Ten canceled the college football season for the fall of 2020 due to the COVID-19 pandemic. This decision was reversed on September 16, with an announcement that each team would play eight games in eight weeks beginning on October 24.

== Spring Game ==
The 2020 Spring Game was scheduled to take place in Bloomington on April 17, 2020, at 7:00 p.m. However, on March 12, 2020, the Big Ten Conference canceled the remainder of all winter and spring sports seasons due to the COVID-19 pandemic.

Date	Time	Spring Game	Site	Result	Source
April 17	7:00 p.m.	Cream vs. Crimson	Memorial Stadium • Bloomington, IN	Canceled	

== Offseason ==
=== Coaching changes ===
On December 17, 2019, the Fresno State Bulldogs announced that they had hired Indiana offensive coordinator Kalen DeBoer as their new head coach; DeBoer had served only one year as the Hoosiers' offensive coordinator. On January 10, 2020, Indiana announced it had promoted Nick Sheridan to offensive coordinator and running backs' coach Mike Hart to associate head coach. On January 19, 2020, Allen announced the additions of Jason Jones as safeties coach, Kevin Wright as tight ends coach and promoted former safeties coach, Kasey Teegardin, to special teams coordinator.

=== Transfers ===
Outgoing

Notable departures from the 2019 squad included:

Name	Number	Pos.	Height	Weight	Year	Hometown	Notes
Coy Cronk	54	Offensive lineman	6'5"	325	Senior (Redshirt)	Lafayette, Indiana	Graduate transfer
Cole Gest	20	Running back	5'8'	194	Senior (Redshirt)	Lyndhurst, Ohio	Graduate transfer
Peyton Ramsey	12	Quarterback	6'2"	216	Senior (Redshirt)	Cincinnati, Ohio	Graduate transfer
Ronnie Walker	23	Running back	5'11"	211	Sophomore	Hopewell, Virginia	Transferred

Incoming

Name	Number	Pos.	Height	Weight	Year	Hometown	Notes	Prev. School
Dylan Powell	72	Offensive lineman	6'3"	300	Senior (Redshirt)	Hannibal, Missouri	Graduate transfer	Stanford
Jovan Swann	51	Defensive line	6'2"	270	Senior (Redshirt)	Greenwood, Indiana	Graduate transfer	Stanford
Khameron Taylor	85	Tight end	6'4"	270	Senior (Redshirt)	Alachua, Florida	Graduate transfer	South Alabama

=== 2020 NFL draft ===
Hoosiers who were picked in the 2020 NFL Draft:

Round	Pick	Player	Position	Team
6	209	Simon Stepaniak	Guard	Green Bay Packers
UFA		Nick Westbrook	Wide receiver	Tennessee Titans

== Preseason ==
=== Position key ===
Back	B	Center	C	Cornerback	CB	Defensive back	DB
Defensive end	DE	Defensive lineman	DL	Defensive tackle	DT	End	E
Fullback	FB	Guard	G	Halfback	HB	Kicker	K
Kickoff returner	KR	Offensive tackle	OT	Offensive lineman	OL	Linebacker	LB
Long snapper	LS	Punter	P	Punt returner	PR	Quarterback	QB
Running back	RB	Safety	S	Tight end	TE	Wide receiver	WR

=== Recruits ===
The Hoosiers signed a total of 20 recruits.

College recruiting (2020)
Name	Hometown	School	Height	Weight	Commit date
David Baker; WR	Indianapolis, Indiana	Scecina Memorial High School	6 ft 3 in (1.91 m)	200 lb (91 kg)	Jun 28, 2019
David Baker; WR	Recruit ratings: Scout: Rivals: 247Sports: ESPN:				
Tim Baldwin Jr. RB	Nokesville, Virginia	Patriot High School	6 ft 0 in (1.83 m)	208 lb (94 kg)	Dec 8, 2019
Tim Baldwin Jr. RB	Recruit ratings: Scout: Rivals: 247Sports: ESPN:				
AJ Barner; TE	Aurora, Ohio	Aurora High School	6 ft 6 in (1.98 m)	225 lb (102 kg)	Dec 8, 2019
AJ Barner; TE	Recruit ratings: Scout: Rivals: 247Sports: ESPN:				
Kahlil Benson; OL	Southaven, Mississippi	Southaven High School	6 ft 6 in (1.98 m)	332 lb (151 kg)	Feb 5, 2020
Kahlil Benson; OL	Recruit ratings: Scout: Rivals: 247Sports: ESPN:				
Bryson Bonds; DB	Crowley, Texas	Crowley High School	6 ft 1 in (1.85 m)	200 lb (91 kg)	Dec 8, 2019
Bryson Bonds; DB	Recruit ratings: Scout: Rivals: 247Sports: ESPN:				
Chris Bradberry; OL	Rancho Cucamonga, California	Etiwanda High School	6 ft 6 in (1.98 m)	300 lb (140 kg)	May 10, 2020
Chris Bradberry; OL	Recruit ratings: No ratings found				
Brady Feeney; OL	St. Louis, Missouri	Christian Brothers College High School	6 ft 4 in (1.93 m)	325 lb (147 kg)	Jul 28, 2019
Brady Feeney; OL	Recruit ratings: Scout: Rivals: 247Sports: ESPN:				
Luke Haggard; OL	Petaluma, California	Petaluma High School	6 ft 7 in (2.01 m)	265 lb (120 kg)	Dec 16, 2019
Luke Haggard; OL	Recruit ratings: Scout: Rivals: 247Sports: ESPN:				
Randy Holtz; OL	Fort Wayne, Indiana	Snider High School	6 ft 7 in (2.01 m)	350 lb (160 kg)	Dec 17, 2019
Randy Holtz; OL	Recruit ratings: Scout: Rivals: 247Sports: ESPN:				
Christopher Keys; DB	Collins, Mississippi	Collins High School	6 ft 0 in (1.83 m)	175 lb (79 kg)	Jun 6, 2019
Christopher Keys; DB	Recruit ratings: Scout: Rivals: 247Sports: ESPN:				
Cameron Knight; OL	Noblesville, Indiana	Noblesville High School	6 ft 3 in (1.91 m)	270 lb (120 kg)	May 18, 2019
Cameron Knight; OL	Recruit ratings: Scout: Rivals: 247Sports: ESPN:				
Damarjhe Lewis; DL	Griffin, Georgia	Griffin High School	6 ft 3 in (1.91 m)	291 lb (132 kg)	Nov 28, 2019
Damarjhe Lewis; DL	Recruit ratings: Scout: Rivals: 247Sports: ESPN:				
Caleb Murphy; DL	Campbellsburg, Indiana	West Washington High School	6 ft 4 in (1.93 m)	260 lb (120 kg)	Jun 4, 2019
Caleb Murphy; DL	Recruit ratings: Scout: Rivals: 247Sports: ESPN:				
Javon Swinton; ATH	Stafford, Virginia	North Stafford High School	6 ft 2 in (1.88 m)	170 lb (77 kg)	Jul 25, 2019
Javon Swinton; ATH	Recruit ratings: Scout: Rivals: 247Sports: ESPN:				
Lem Watley-Neely; DB	Harper Woods, Michigan	Harper Woods High School	6 ft 0 in (1.83 m)	175 lb (79 kg)	Jun 23, 2019
Lem Watley-Neely; DB	Recruit ratings: Scout: Rivals: 247Sports: ESPN:				
Luke Wiginton; OL	Fort Wayne, Indiana	Bishop Dwenger High School	6 ft 5 in (1.96 m)	289 lb (131 kg)	Apr 6, 2019
Luke Wiginton; OL	Recruit ratings: Scout: Rivals: 247Sports: ESPN:				
Rashawn Williams; WR	Detroit, Michigan	Martin Luther King High School	6 ft 2 in (1.88 m)	200 lb (91 kg)	Apr 29, 2019
Rashawn Williams; WR	Recruit ratings: Scout: Rivals: 247Sports: ESPN:				
Dexter Williams II; QB	Macon, Georgia	Mount de Sales Academy	6 ft 1 in (1.85 m)	210 lb (95 kg)	Jun 23, 2019
Dexter Williams II; QB	Recruit ratings: Scout: Rivals: 247Sports: ESPN:				
Ty Wise; LB	Carmel, Indiana	Carmel High School	6 ft 2 in (1.88 m)	222 lb (101 kg)	Mar 7, 2019
Ty Wise; LB	Recruit ratings: Scout: Rivals: 247Sports: ESPN:				
Overall recruit ranking: Rivals: 48 247Sports: 58 ESPN: 55
Note: In many cases, Scout, Rivals, 247Sports, On3, and ESPN may conflict in their listings of height and weight.; In these cases, the average was taken. ESPN grades are on a 100-point scale.; Sources: "Indiana Football Commitments". Rivals.; "2020 Team Ranking". Rivals.com.

=== Preseason Big Ten poll ===
Although the Big Ten Conference has not held an official preseason poll since 2010, Cleveland.com has polled sports journalists representing all member schools as a de facto preseason media poll since 2011. For the 2020 poll, Indiana was projected to finish fourth in the East Division.

== Schedule ==
The Hoosiers' 2020 schedule originally consisted of 7 home games and 5 away games; however, the Big Ten moved to a conference-only schedule due to the COVID-19 pandemic. The Hoosiers were also originally scheduled to play three non-conference games, against Western Kentucky and Ball State at home and on the road against UConn.

The Hoosiers were scheduled to host Penn State, Illinois, Michigan, Maryland and Purdue. They were scheduled to travel to Wisconsin, Ohio State, Minnesota, Rutgers and Michigan State.

The season was canceled on August 11, 2020, but announced on September 16 that the decision had been reversed, and that the football season would begin on October 23.

On December 9, Purdue and Indiana announced a mutual one-time cancellation of the Old Oaken Bucket game scheduled for December 12 after team-related activities were paused because of an elevated number of coronavirus cases within both the Boilermakers' and Hoosiers' programs. On December 13, Purdue and Indiana came to an agreement to reschedule the Old Oaken Bucket game for one week later, on December 18; however, on December 15, both teams again decided to cancel the Friday contest, due to issues remaining on both teams with COVID complications.

Date	Time	Opponent	Rank	Site	TV	Result	Attendance
October 24	3:30 p.m.	No. 8 Penn State		Memorial Stadium; Bloomington, IN	FS1	W 36–35 ^{OT}	995
October 31	3:30 p.m.	at Rutgers	No. 17	SHI Stadium; Piscataway, NJ	FS1	W 37–21	0
November 7	12:00 p.m.	No. 23 Michigan	No. 13	Memorial Stadium; Bloomington, IN	FS1	W 38–21	1,034
November 14	12:00 p.m.	at Michigan State	No. 10	Spartan Stadium; East Lansing, MI (rivalry)	ABC	W 24–0	340
November 21	12:00 p.m.	at No. 3 Ohio State	No. 9	Ohio Stadium; Columbus, OH	FOX	L 35–42	635
November 28	12:00 p.m.	Maryland	No. 12	Memorial Stadium; Bloomington, IN	ESPN2	W 27–11	963
December 5	3:30 p.m.	at No. 16 Wisconsin	No. 12	Camp Randall Stadium; Madison, WI	ABC	W 14–6	0
December 12	3:30 p.m.	Purdue		Memorial Stadium; Bloomington, IN (Old Oaken Bucket)	BTN	No contest	
December 18	7:30 p.m.	Purdue		Memorial Stadium; Bloomington, IN (Championship Week, Old Oaken Bucket)	BTN	No contest	
January 2, 2021	12:30 p.m.	vs. Ole Miss*	No. 11	Raymond James Stadium; Tampa, FL (Outback Bowl)	ABC	L 20–26	11,025
*Non-conference game; Rankings from AP Poll and CFP Rankings (after November 24) released prior to game; All times are in Eastern time

== Rankings ==
Ranking movements Legend: ██ Increase in ranking ██ Decrease in ranking — = Not ranked RV = Received votes
	Week																	
Poll	Pre	1	2	3	4	5	6	7	8	9	10	11	12	13	14	15	16	Final
AP	RV	none	—*	—*	—	RV			17	13	10	9	12	10	8	7	7	12
Coaches	RV	none	—*	—*	—			RV	19	13	10	10	12	11	9	7	8	13
CFP	Not released												12	12	12	11	11	Not released

(*) Big Ten Conference members were not eligible for the Week 2 of the AP and Coaches Polls and Week 3 of the AP due to not having a scheduled season at the time.

== Game summaries ==
=== vs No. 8 Penn State ===
No. 8 Penn State Nittany Lions (0–0) vs Indiana Hoosiers (0–0) – Game summary

Quarter	1	2	3	4	OT	Total
No. 8 Nittany Lions	7	0	7	14	7	35
Hoosiers	0	17	0	11	8	36

at Memorial Stadium • Bloomington, Indiana

- Date: October 24, 2020
- Game time: 3:30 p.m.
- Game weather: Sunny, 54 °F (12 °C)
- Game attendance: 995
- Referee: Ron Snodgrass
- TV announcers (FS1): Aaron Goldsmith (play-by-play), Mark Helfrich (analyst)
- Sources: IUHoosiers.com

Game information

First quarter

- (7:59) PSU – Pat Freiermuth 2-yard pass from Sean Clifford, Jake Pinegar kick (Drive: 13 plays, 64 yards, 7:01; Penn State 7–0)

Second quarter

- (12:24) IU – Charles Campbell 34-yard field goal (Drive: 9 plays, 22 yards, 3:15; Penn State 7–3)
- (8:12) IU – Stevie Scott III 14-yard run, Charles Campbell kick (Drive: 6 plays, 62 yards, 2:02; Indiana 10–7)
- (6:36) IU – Stevie Scott III 2-yard run, Charles Campbell kick (Drive: 2 plays, 4 yards, 0:30; Indiana 17–7)

Third quarter

- (0:00) PSU – Sean Clifford 35-yard run, Jake Pinegar kick (Drive: 8 plays, 57 yards, 4:07; Indiana 17–14)

Fourth quarter

- (13:18) IU – Charles Campbell 34-yard field goal (Drive: 9 plays, 44 yards, 1:42; Indiana 20–14)
- (2:30) PSU – Jahan Dotson 60-yard pass from Sean Clifford, Jake Pinegar kick (Drive: 3 plays, 74 yards, 0:44; Penn State 21–20)
- (1:42) PSU – Devyn Ford 14-yard run, Jake Pinegar kick (Drive: 1 play, 14 yards, 0:05; Penn State 28–20)
- (0:22) IU – Michael Penix Jr. 1-yard run, Michael Penix Jr. two-point run (Drive: 7 plays, 75 yards, 1:20; Tied 28–28)

Overtime

- (0:00) PSU – Parker Washington 9-yard pass from Sean Clifford, Jake Pinegar kick (Drive: 4 plays, 25 yards, 0:00; Penn State 35–28)
- (0:00) IU – Whop Philyor 9-yard pass from Michael Penix Jr., Michael Penix Jr. two-point run (Drive: 5 plays, 25 yards, 0:00; Indiana 36–35)

Statistics	PSU	IU
First downs	27	16
Total yards	488	211
Rushes/yards	52–250	26–41
Passing yards	238	170
Passing: Comp–Att–Int	24–35–2	19–36–1
Time of possession	40:25	19:35

Team	Category	Player	Statistics
Penn State	Passing	Sean Clifford	24/35, 238 yards, 3 TD, 2 INT
Penn State	Rushing	Sean Clifford	17 carries, 119 yards, TD
Penn State	Receiving	Jahan Dotson	4 receptions, 94 yards, TD
Indiana	Passing	Michael Penix Jr.	19/36, 170 yards, TD, INT
Indiana	Rushing	Stevie Scott III	20 carries, 57 yards, 2 TD
Indiana	Receiving	Miles Marshall	4 reception, 46 yards

=== At Rutgers ===
No. 17 Indiana Hoosiers (1–0) at Rutgers Scarlet Knights (1–0) – Game summary

Quarter	1	2	3	4	Total
No. 17 Hoosiers	3	17	10	7	37
Scarlet Knights	7	0	8	6	21

at SHI Stadium • Piscataway, New Jersey

- Date: October 31, 2020
- Game time: 3:30 p.m.
- Game weather: Rainy, 39 °F (4 °C)
- Game attendance: 0
- Referee: Reggie Smith
- TV announcers (FS1): Joe Beninati (play-by-play), Matt Millen (analyst)
- Sources: IUHoosiers.com

Game information

First quarter

- (7:35) RUTG – Bo Melton 23-yard pass from Noah Vedral, Guy Fava kick (Drive: 4 plays, 43 yards, 1:40; Rutgers 7–0)
- (1:46) IU – Charles Campbell 42-yard field goal (Drive: 14 plays, 57 yards, 5:49; Rutgers 7–3)

Second quarter

- (10:02) IU – Charles Campbell 28-yard field goal (Drive: 9 plays, 51 yards, 4:51; Rutgers 7–6)
- (4:56) IU – Michael Penix Jr. 1-yard run, Charles Campbell kick (Drive: 3 plays, 6 yards, 1:04; Indiana 13–7)
- (3:13) IU – Ty Fryfogle 15-yard pass from Michael Penix Jr., Charles Campbell kick (Drive: 3 plays, 28 yards, 1:30; Indiana 20–7)

Third quarter

- (10:08) IU – Charles Campbell 31-yard field goal (Drive: 5 plays, 55 yards, 2:25; Indiana 23–7)
- (5:34) RUTG – Kay'Ron Adams 37-yard run, Isiah Pacheco two-point run (Drive: 10 plays, 80 yards, 4:34; Indiana 23–15)
- (3:56) IU – Peyton Hendershot 2-yard pass from Michael Penix Jr., Charles Campbell kick (Drive: 4 plays, 75 yards, 1:38; Indiana 30–15)

Fourth quarter

- (12:37) IU – Peyton Hendershot 1-yard pass from Michael Penix Jr., Charles Campbell kick (Drive: 8 plays, 82 yards, 3:59; Indiana 37–15)
- (3:21) RUTG – Bo Melton 16-yard pass from Noah Vedral (Drive: 10 plays, 71 yards, 2:48; Indiana 37–21)

Statistics	IU	RUTG
First downs	20	19
Total yards	347	247
Rushes/yards	40–109	33–121
Passing yards	238	126
Passing: Comp–Att–Int	17–26–0	22–35–3
Time of possession	32:31	27:29

Team	Category	Player	Statistics
Indiana	Passing	Michael Penix Jr.	17/26, 238 yards, 3 TD
Indiana	Rushing	Stevie Scott III	21 carries, 81 yards
Indiana	Receiving	Whop Philyor	5 receptions, 137 yards
Rutgers	Passing	Noah Vedral	21/34, 130 yards, 2 TD, 3 INT
Rutgers	Rushing	Kayron Adams	5 carries, 63 yards, TD
Rutgers	Receiving	Bo Melton	4 receptions, 48 yards, 2 TD

=== vs No. 23 Michigan ===
No. 23 Michigan Wolverines (1–1) vs No. 13 Indiana Hoosiers (2–0) – Game summary

Quarter	1	2	3	4	Total
No. 23 Wolverines	7	0	7	7	21
No. 13 Hoosiers	14	10	7	7	38

at Memorial Stadium • Bloomington, Indiana

- Date: November 7, 2020
- Game time: 12:00 p.m.
- Game weather: Sunny, 72 °F (22 °C)
- Game attendance: 1,034
- Referee: Mark Klucynski
- TV announcers (FS1): Joe Davis (play-by-play), Brock Huard (analyst)
- Sources: IUHoosiers.com

Game information

First quarter

- (8:57) IU – Miles Marshall 13-yard pass from Michael Penix Jr., Charles Campbell kick (Drive: 11 plays, 74 yards, 4:30; Indiana 7–0)
- (4:48) MICH – Cornelius Johnson 37-yard pass from Joe Milton, Quinn Nordin kick (Drive: 4 plays, 78 yards, 1:02; Tied 7–7)
- (1:41) IU – Ty Fryfogle 24-yard pass from Michael Penix Jr., Charles Campbell kick (Drive: 7 plays, 75 yards, 3:07; Indiana 14–7)

Second quarter

- (6:53) IU – Charles Campbell 52-yard field goal (Drive: 11 plays, 53 yards, 3:58; Indiana 17–7)
- (0:56) IU – Peyton Hendershot 1-yard pass from Michael Penix Jr., Charles Campbell kick (Drive: 12 plays, 96 yards, 4:21; Indiana 24–7)

Third quarter

- (9:01) MICH – Roman Wilson 13-yard pass from Joe Milton, Quinn Nordin kick (Drive: 5 plays, 80 yards, 2:57; Indiana 24–14)
- (4:39) IU – Stevie Scott III 1-yard run, Charles Campbell kick (Drive: 10 plays, 75 yards, 4:22; Indiana 31–14)

Fourth quarter

- (13:43) MICH – Ronnie Bell 21-yard pass from Joe Milton, Quinn Nordin kick (Drive: 6 plays, 64 yards, 2:01; Indiana 31–21)
- (8:40) IU – Stevie Scott III 2-yard run, Charles Campbell kick (Drive: 8 plays, 29 yards, 3:48; Indiana 38–21)

Statistics	MICH	IU
First downs	17	28
Total yards	357	460
Rushes/yards	18–13	38–118
Passing yards	344	342
Passing: Comp–Att–Int	18–34–2	30–50–0
Time of possession	21:10	38:50

Team	Category	Player	Statistics
Michigan	Passing	Joe Milton	18/34, 344 yards, 3 TD, 2 INT
Michigan	Rushing	Hassan Haskins	6 carries, 19 yards
Michigan	Receiving	Ronnie Bell	6 receptions, 149 yards, TD
Indiana	Passing	Michael Penix Jr.	30/50, 342 yards, 3 TD
Indiana	Rushing	Stevie Scott III	24 carries, 98 yards, TD
Indiana	Receiving	Ty Fryfogle	7 reception, 142 yards, TD

This was the Hoosiers' first win over Michigan since 1987.

=== At Michigan State ===
No. 10 Indiana Hoosiers (3–0) at Michigan State Spartans (1–2) – Game summary

Quarter	1	2	3	4	Total
No. 10 Hoosiers	14	10	0	0	24
Spartans	0	0	0	0	0

at Spartan Stadium • East Lansing, Michigan

- Date: November 14, 2020
- Game time: 12:00 p.m.
- Game weather: Rainy, 36 °F (2 °C)
- Game attendance: 340
- Referee: John O'Neill
- TV announcers (ABC): Dave Pasch (play-by-play), Greg McElroy (analyst)
- Sources: IUHoosiers.com

Game information

First quarter

- (2:11) IU – Stevie Scott III 8-yard run, Charles Campbell kick (Drive: 7 plays, 50 yards, 3:15; Indiana 7–0)
- (1:14) IU – Ty Fryfogle 16-yard pass from Michael Penix Jr., Charles Campbell kick (Drive: 2 plays, 16 yards, 0:15; Indiana 14–0)

Second quarter

- (9:22) IU – Charles Campbell 21-yard field goal (Drive: 7 plays, 22 yards, 2:23; Indiana 17–0)
- (4:56) IU – Ty Fryfogle 65-yard pass from Michael Penix Jr., Charles Campbell kick (Drive: 5 plays, 79 yards, 2:40; Indiana 24–0)

Third quarter

None

Fourth quarter

None

Statistics	IU	MSU
First downs	21	9
Total yards	433	191
Rushes/yards	39–113	24–60
Passing yards	320	131
Passing: Comp–Att–Int	25–38–2	13–27–3
Time of possession	39:14	20:46

Team	Category	Player	Statistics
Indiana	Passing	Michael Penix Jr.	25/38, 320 yards, 2 TD, 2 INT
Indiana	Rushing	Stevie Scott III	23 carries, 84 yards, TD
Indiana	Receiving	Ty Fryfogle	11 receptions, 200 yards, 2 TD
Michigan State	Passing	Payton Thorne	10/20, 110 yards, INT
Michigan State	Rushing	Connor Heyward	5 carries, 27 yards
Michigan State	Receiving	Jayden Reed	7 receptions, 63 yards

=== At No. 3 Ohio State ===
No. 9 Indiana Hoosiers (4–0) at No. 3 Ohio State Buckeyes (3–0) – Game summary

Quarter	1	2	3	4	Total
No. 9 Hoosiers	0	7	14	14	35
No. 3 Buckeyes	7	21	14	0	42

at Ohio Stadium • Columbus, Ohio

- Date: November 21, 2020
- Game time: 12:05 p.m.
- Game weather: Cloudy, 48 °F (9 °C)
- Game attendance: 635
- Referee: Jerry McGinn
- TV announcers (FOX): Gus Johnson (play-by-play), Joel Klatt (analyst), Jenny Taft (sideline)
- Sources: IUHoosiers.com

Game information

First quarter

- (12:32) OSU – Garrett Wilson 10-yard pass from Justin Fields, Jake Seibert kick (Drive: 2 plays, 75 yards, 0:33; Ohio State 7–0)

Second quarter

- (11:03) IU – Whop Philyor 4-yard pass from Michael Penix Jr., Charles Campbell kick (Drive: 6 plays, 84 yards, 3:05; Tied 7–7)
- (8:57) OSU – Master Teague 41-yard run, Jake Seibert kick (Drive: 7 plays, 75 yards, 2:06; Ohio State 14–7)
- (4:32) OSU – Master Teague 2-yard run, Jake Seibert kick (Drive: 8 plays, 76 yards, 3:02; Ohio State 21–7)
- (0:17) OSU – Justin Fields 9-yard run, Jake Seibert kick (Drive: 9 plays, 93 yards, 2:54; Ohio State 28–7)

Third quarter

- (12:10) OSU – Garrett Wilson 9-yard pass from Justin Fields, Jake Seibert kick (Drive: 6 plays, 75 yards, 2:50; Ohio State 35–7)
- (10:48) IU – Ty Fryfogle 63-yard pass from Michael Penix Jr., Charles Campbell kick (Drive: 3 plays, 75 yards, 1:22; Ohio State 35–14)
- (5:14) IU – Ty Fryfogle 33-yard pass from Michael Penix Jr., Charles Campbell kick (Drive: 5 plays, 60 yards, 1:59; Ohio State 35–21)
- (0:49) OSU – Shaun Wade 36-yard interception return, Jake Seibert kick (Drive: 2 plays, 0 yards, 0:15; Ohio State 42–21)

Fourth quarter

- (12:26) IU – David Ellis 16-yard pass from Michael Penix Jr., Charles Campbell kick (Drive: 10 plays, 75 yards, 3:23; Ohio State 42–28)
- (10:26) IU – Ty Fryfogle 56-yard pass from Michael Penix Jr., Charles Campbell kick (Drive: 2 plays, 56 yards, 0:14; Ohio State 42–35)

Statistics	IU	OSU
First downs	19	27
Total yards	490	607
Rushes/yards	16–-1	50–307
Passing yards	491	300
Passing: Comp–Att–Int	27–51–1	18–30–3
Time of possession	23:36	36:24

Team	Category	Player	Statistics
Indiana	Passing	Michael Penix Jr.	27/51, 491 yards, 5 TD, INT
Indiana	Rushing	Sampson James	3 carries, 10 yards
Indiana	Receiving	Ty Fryfogle	7 receptions, 218 yards, 3 TD
Ohio State	Passing	Justin Fields	18/30, 300 yards, 2 TD, 3 INT
Ohio State	Rushing	Master Teague	26 carries, 169 yards, 2 TD
Ohio State	Receiving	Garrett Wilson	7 receptions, 169 yards, 2 TD

=== vs Maryland ===
Maryland Terrapins (2–1) vs No. 12 Indiana Hoosiers (4–1) – Game summary

Quarter	1	2	3	4	Total
Terrapins	0	3	0	8	11
No. 12 Hoosiers	7	0	10	10	27

at Memorial Stadium • Bloomington, Indiana

- Date: November 28, 2020
- Game time: 12:00 p.m.
- Game weather: Sunny, 46 °F (8 °C)
- Game attendance: 963
- Referee: Reggie Smith
- TV announcers (ESPN 2): Roy Philpott (play-by-play), Kelly Stouffer (analyst)
- Sources: IUHoosiers.com

Game information

First quarter

- (4:02) IU – Stevie Scott III 3-yard run, Charles Campbell kick (Drive: 11 plays, 74 yards, 5:11; Indiana 7–0)

Second quarter

- (4:06) MARY – Joseph Petrino 38-yard field goal (Drive: 7 plays, 50 yards, 2:13; Indiana 7–3)

Third quarter

- (8:10) IU – Team safety (Drive: 1 play, -4 yards, 0:04; Indiana 9–3)
- (3:44) IU – Stevie Scott III 1-yard run, Jack Tuttle two-point pass to Peyton Hendershot (Drive: 8 plays, 53 yards, 4:26; Indiana 17–3)

Fourth quarter

- (13:27) IU – Charles Campbell 38-yard field goal (Drive: 7 plays, 61 yards, 3:52; Indiana 20–3)
- (8:22) IU – Stevie Scott III 2-yard run, Charles Campbell kick (Drive: 7 plays, 39 yards, 4:28; Indiana 27–3)
- (1:32) MARY – Dontay Demus Jr. 43-yard pass from Taulia Tagovailoa, Taulia Tagovailoa two-point pass to Carlos Carriere kick (Drive: 7 plays, 73 yards, 3:34; Indiana 27–11)

Statistics	MARY	IU
First downs	16	17
Total yards	300	349
Rushes/yards	25–59	48–234
Passing yards	241	115
Passing: Comp–Att–Int	17–36–3	11–24–0
Time of possession	23:41	36:19

Team	Category	Player	Statistics
Maryland	Passing	Taulia Tagovailoa	17/36, 241 yards, TD, 3 INT
Maryland	Rushing	Peny Boone	9 carries, 35 yards
Maryland	Receiving	Dontay Demus Jr.	6 receptions, 114 yards, TD
Indiana	Passing	Michael Penix Jr.	6/19, 84 yards
Indiana	Rushing	Tim Baldwin Jr.	16 carries, 106 yards
Indiana	Receiving	Miles Marshall	2 reception, 39 yards

=== At No. 16 Wisconsin ===
No. 12 Indiana Hoosiers (5–1) at No. 16 Wisconsin Badgers (2–1) – Game summary

Quarter	1	2	3	4	Total
No. 12 Hoosiers	0	7	7	0	14
No. 16 Badgers	0	3	3	0	6

at Camp Randall Stadium • Madison, Wisconsin

- Date: December 5, 2020
- Game time: 2:30 p.m. CST
- Game weather: Cloudy, 36 °F (2 °C)
- Game attendance: 0
- Referee: Mark Kluczynski
- TV announcers (ABC): Joe Tessitore (play-by-play), Greg McElroy (analyst)
- Sources: IUHoosiers.com

Game information

First quarter

None

Second quarter

- (11:03) IU – Peyton Hendershot 1-yard pass from Jack Tuttle, Charles Campbell kick (Drive: 12 plays, 53 yards, 4:48; Indiana 7–0)
- (4:03) WISC – Collin Larsh 29-yard field goal (Drive: 12 plays, 81 yards, 6:55; Indiana 7–3)

Third quarter

- (11:03) IU – Whop Philyor 1-yard pass from Jack Tuttle, Charles Campbell kick (Drive: 7 plays, 75 yards, 3:57; Indiana 14–3)
- (0:21) WISC – Collin Larsh 29-yard field goal (Drive: 12 plays, 52 yards, 6:49; Indiana 14–6)

Fourth quarter

None

Statistics	IU	WISC
First downs	15	19
Total yards	217	342
Rushes/yards	31–87	35–140
Passing yards	130	202
Passing: Comp–Att–Int	13–22–0	20–34–1
Time of possession	24:52	35:08

Team	Category	Player	Statistics
Indiana	Passing	Jack Tuttle	13/22, 140 yards, 2 TD
Indiana	Rushing	Stevie Scott III	18 carries, 57 yards
Indiana	Receiving	Whop Philyor	4 receptions, 47 yards, TD
Wisconsin	Passing	Graham Mertz	20/34, 202 yards, INT
Wisconsin	Rushing	Jalen Berger	15 carries, 87 yards
Wisconsin	Receiving	Jake Ferguson	5 receptions, 54 yards

=== vs Purdue ===
Purdue Boilermakers (2–4) vs No. 11 Indiana Hoosiers (6–1) – Game summary

Quarter	1	2	3	4	Total
Boilermakers	0	0	0	0	0
No. 11 Hoosiers	0	0	0	0	0

at Memorial Stadium • Bloomington, Indiana

- Date: December 12, 2020 & December 18, 2020
- Game time: Cancelled
- TV: BTN

=== vs Ole Miss (Outback Bowl) ===
Ole Miss Rebels (5–4) vs No. 11 Indiana Hoosiers (6–1) – Game summary
(2021 Outback Bowl)

Quarter	1	2	3	4	Total
Rebels	6	7	7	6	26
No. 11 Hoosiers	3	0	3	14	20

at Raymond James Stadium • Tampa, FL

- Date: January 2, 2021
- Game time: 12:30 p.m.
- Game weather: Sunny, 78 °F (26 °C)
- Game attendance: 11,025
- Referee: Gary Patterson
- TV announcers (ABC): Tom Hart (play-by-play), Jordan Rodgers (analyst), Cole Cubelic (sideline)
- Sources: IUHoosiers.com

Game information

First quarter

- (12:56) MISS – Luke Logan 26-yard field goal (Drive: 7 plays, 57 yards, 2:04; Ole Miss 3–0)
- (2:47) IU – Charles Campbell 50-yard field goal (Drive: 11 plays, 49 yards, 6:07; Tied 3–3)
- (0:23) MISS – Luke Logan 24-yard field goal (Drive: 13 plays, 68 yards, 2:24; Ole Miss 6–3)

Second quarter

- (7:17) MISS – Casey Kelly 5-yard pass from Matt Corral, Luke Logan kick (Drive: 18 plays, 76 yards, 6:00; Ole Miss 13–3)

Third quarter

- (12:53) IU – Charles Campbell 53-yard field goal (Drive: 8 plays, 40 yards, 2:07; Ole Miss 13–6)
- (9:20) MISS – Snoop Conner 4-yard run, Luke Logan kick (Drive: 12 plays, 87 yards, 3:33; Ole Miss 20–6)

Fourth quarter

- (14:56) IU – Stevie Scott III 3-yard run, Charles Campbell kick (Drive: 15 plays, 80 yards, 6:45; Ole Miss 20–13)
- (5:58) IU – Stevie Scott III 2-yard run, Charles Campbell kick (Drive: 12 plays, 80 yards, 5:40; Tied 20–20)
- (4:12) MISS – Dontario Drummond 1-yard pass from Matt Corral (Drive: 6 plays, 63 yards, 1:46; Ole Miss 26–20)

Statistics	MISS	IU
First downs	27	26
Total yards	493	369
Rushes/yards	35–147	40–168
Passing yards	346	201
Passing: Comp–Att–Int	31–45–0	26–45–1
Time of possession	24:19	35:41

Team	Category	Player	Statistics
Ole Miss	Passing	Matt Corral	30/44, 342 yards, 2 TD
Ole Miss	Rushing	Henry Parrish	17 carries, 63 yards
Ole Miss	Receiving	Dontario Drummond	6 receptions, 110 yards, TD
Indiana	Passing	Jack Tuttle	26/45, 201 yards, INT
Indiana	Rushing	Stevie Scott III	19 carries, 99 yards, 2 TD
Indiana	Receiving	Whop Philyor	18 reception, 81 yards

== Roster ==
2020 Indiana Hoosiers football team roster
Players
Coaches
Offense

Pos.	#	Name	Class
WR	1	Whop Philyor	Sr
WR	2	Jacolby Hewitt	So
WR	3	Ty Fryfogle	Sr
WR	4	David Baker	Fr
QB	5	Dexter Williams II	Fr
RB	6	Sampson James	So
RB	8	Stevie Scott III	Jr
QB	9	Michael Penix Jr. (injured)	So
RB	10	David Ellis	So
WR	12	Da'Shaun Brown	Fr
WR	13	Miles Marshall	So
QB	14	Jack Tuttle	So
QB	15	Zack Merrill	Fr
QB	16	Grant Gremel	Fr
WR	17	Jordan Jakes	Fr
WR	18	Javon Swinton	Fr
RB	22	Tim Baldwin, Jr	Fr
QB	25	Will Jontz	Fr
WR	25	Cam Wilson	Jr
WR	27	Luke Shayotovich	So
RB	28	Charlie Spegal	Fr
RB	34	Davion Ervin-Poindexter	So
RB	36	Chris Childers	Jr
RB	37	Ahrod Lloyd	Jr
TE	39	Ryan Barnes	So
TE	45	Trey Walker	Fr
TE	49	Sam Daugstrup	Fr
OL	51	Mackenzie Nworah	Sr
OL	52	DaVondre Love	Sr
OL	54	Brady Feeney	Fr
OL	55	Luke Lane	Fr
OL	56	Mike Katic	Fr
OL	57	Harry Crider	Sr
OL	58	Chris Bradberry	Jr
OL	59	Gavin McCabe	So
OL	61	Ricky Tamis	Fr
OL	62	Cameron Knight	Fr
OL	63	Andy Buttrell	Fr
OL	64	Tyler Graff	Fr
OL	65	Dominic Altimari	Jr
OL	66	Aidan Rafferty	So
OL	67	Kahlil Benson	Fr
OL	69	Peter Schulz	Fr
OL	70	Luke Haggard	Jr
OL	71	Randy Holtz	Fr
OL	72	Dylan Powell	Sr
OL	73	Tim Weaver	Fr
OL	74	Nick Marozas	So
OL	75	Luke Wiginton	Fr
OL	76	Matthew Bedford	So
OL	77	Caleb Jones	Jr
OL	78	Britt Beery	Jr
OL	79	Charlie O'Connor	So
WR	81	Gary Cooper	Fr
WR	82	Christian Harris	Jr
WR	83	Bryan Parker	Jr
TE	84	Turon Ivy Jr.	So
WR	85	McCall Ray	Fr
TE	85	Khameron Taylor	GS
TE	86	Peyton Hendershot	Jr
TE	88	AJ Barner	Fr
TE	89	Matt Bjorson	Jr
TE	96	Caleb Murphy	Fr

Defense

Pos.	#	Name	Class
DB	1	Devon Matthews	Jr
DB	2	Reese Taylor	Jr
DB	3	Tiawan Mullen	So
DB	4	Cam Jones	Jr
DB	5	Juwan Burgess	Jr
DL	6	James Head Jr.	Jr
DB	7	Christopher Keys	Fr
LB	8	James Miller	So
DB	9	Marcelino McCrary-Ball (injured)	Sr
DB	12	Lem Watley-Neely	Fr
DB	14	Larry Tracy III	Fr
DB	17	Raheem Layne	Sr
DL	18	Jonathan King	So
DB	19	Josh Sanguinetti	Fr
DB	20	Joseph Daniels Jr.	So
DB	21	Noah Pierre	So
DB	22	Jamar Johnson	Jr
DB	23	Jaylin Williams	Jr
DB	24	Bryson Bonds	Fr
DB	26	Gabe Cohen	Sr
LB	27	Xavier Trueblood	Fr
DB	29	Liam Zaccheo	Fr
DB	30	Jordan Jusevitch	So
DB	31	Bryant Fitzgerald	Jr
DB	33	Connor Hole	Fr
DL	34	Damarjhe Lewis	Fr
DB	35	DeKaleb Thomas	So
DB	36	Nicholas Grieser	Fr
DB	37	Ty Wise	Fr
DB	38	Jeremy Boyd	Jr
LB	39	Patrick Finley	Fr
LB	40	Cameron Williams	Fr
DL	41	Beau Robbins	Fr
LB	42	D. K. Bonhomme	So
DB	43	Samuel Slusher	Jr
LB	44	Thomas Allen	Jr
LB	46	Aaron Casey	So
LB	47	Micah McFadden	Jr
DL	48	Jalen Mayala	Fr
LB	49	Brett Wethington	Fr
DL	50	Sio Nofoagatoto'a	So
DL	51	Jovan Swann	GS
DL	52	Shamar Jones	So
DL	53	Stephen Walker II	Fr
DL	55	C. J. Person	Fr
DL	60	Dalton Davis	Fr
DL	67	Christian Love	So
DL	87	Michael Ziemba	Sr
DL	91	Jeramy Passmore	Fr
DL	92	Alfred Bryant	Jr
DL	94	DeMarcus Elliott	Jr
DL	95	Antoine Whitner Jr.	Fr
DL	97	Tramar Reece	Jr
DL	98	Jerome Johnson	Sr

Special teams

Pos.	#	Name	Class
K	80	Chris Freeman	Fr
P	83	Asher King	Fr
LS	60	Jacob Limbach	Sr
K	90	Jared Smolar	Sr
P	92	Chase Wyatt	Fr
K	93	Charles Campbell	So
P	94	Haydon Whitehead	GS
LS	95	Sean Wracher	So
LS	97	Jake Wellmann	Fr
K	99	Jack Cardillo	Jr

Head coach

- Tom Allen

Coordinators/assistant coaches

- Mike Hart (assistant head coach / running backs)
- Grant Heard (co-offensive coordinator/wide receivers)
- Darren Hiller (run game coordinator/offensive line)
- Jason Jones (safeties)
- Kevin Peoples (defensive line)
- Brandon Shelby (cornerbacks)
- Nick Sheridan (offensive coordinator/quarterbacks)
- Kasey Teegardin (special teams coordinator/defensive backs)
- Kane Wommack (defensive coordinator/linebackers)
- Kevin Wright (tight ends)
- Aaron Wellman (senior assistant athletic director for football performance)
- Danny Friend (graduate assistant – offense)
- Jeff McInerney (quality control - special teams)
- Ryan McInerney (quality control - defense)
- Drew Moulton (quality control - offense)
- Lee Wilbanks (senior director of recruiting)
- Dwike Wilson (director of player personnel & high school relations)
- Mike Doig (director of football operations)
- Mike Pechac (director of player development & academic enhancement)

Legend

- (C) Team captain
- (S) Suspended
- (I) Ineligible
- Injured
- Redshirt

Roster
Last update: May 6, 2020

== Awards and honors ==
=== Award watch lists ===
Listed in the order that they were released

Award	Player	Position	Year	Date Awarded	Ref
Chuck Bednarik Award	Tiawan Mullen	DB	SO	July 13, 2020	
Doak Walker Award	Stevie Scott	RB	JR	July 15, 2020	
Fred Biletnikoff Award	Whop Philyor	WR	SR	July 16, 2020	
John Mackey Award	Peyton Hendershot	TE	JR (RS)	July 17, 2020	
Wuerffel Trophy	Harry Crider	OL	SR	July 23, 2020	
Maxwell Award	Michael Penix Jr.	QB	SO (RS)	July 24, 2020	
Maxwell Award	Whop Philyor	WR	SR	July 24, 2020	
Maxwell Award	Stevie Scott	RB	JR	July 24, 2020	
Campbell Trophy	Harry Crider	OL	SR	October 1, 2020	
Rimington Trophy	Harry Crider	OL	SR	October 14, 2020	
Jason Witten; Collegiate Man of the Year	Harry Crider	OL	SR	November 17, 2020	
Fred Biletnikoff Award - Semi-Finalist	Ty Fryfogle	WR	SR	November 19, 2020; December 7, 2020	
Davey O’Brien Award - Semi-Finalist	Michael Penix Jr.	QB	SO (RS)	December 7, 2020	
Ray Guy Award - Semi-Finalist	Haydon Whitehead	P	Graduate	December 7, 2020	
Broyles Award - Finalist	Kane Wommack	Defensive coordinator		December 15, 2020; December 22, 2020	
Eddie Robinson Coach of the Year Award - Semi-Finalist	Tom Allen	Head coach		December 21, 2020	
Paul "Bear" Bryant Award - Finalist	Tom Allen	Head coach		November 17, 2020; December 22, 2020	
Bobby Dodd Coach of the Year Award - Finalist	Tom Allen	Head coach		November 19, 2020; December 22, 2020	
George Munger Award - Finalist	Tom Allen	Head coach		December 23, 2020; January 5, 2021	

=== Players / Coaches of the Week ===
Big Ten / National Weekly Awards
Player	Award	Date Awarded	Ref.
Jamar Johnson	B1G Co-defensive Players of the Week	October 26, 2020	
Tom Allen	Dodd Trophy Coach of the Week	October 27, 2020	
Charles Campbell	B1G Special Teams Player of the Week	November 2, 2020	
Charles Campbell	Lou Groza Award - Star of the Week	November 2, 2020	
Michael Penix Jr.	Manning Award - Star of the Week	November 9, 2020	
Michael Penix Jr.	Davey O'Brien National Quarterback Award - Week 10 - Great 8	November 9, 2020	
Michael Penix Jr.	Manning Award - Quarterback of the Week	November 12, 2020	
Ty Fryfogle	B1G Offensive Player of the Week	November 16, 2020	
Ty Fryfogle	B1G Offensive Player of the Week	November 23, 2020	
Michael Penix Jr.	Davey O'Brien National Quarterback Award - Week 12 - Great 8	November 23, 2020	
Stevie Scott III	B1G Offensive Player of the Week	November 30, 2020	
Micah McFadden	Walter Camp Defensive Player of the Week	December 6, 2020	
Micah McFadden	B1G Defensive Player of the Week	December 7, 2020	
Haydon Whitehead	B1G Co-Special Teams Player of the Week	December 7, 2020	

=== B1G Conference awards ===
Awards
Player	Award	Date Awarded	Ref.
Ty Fryfogle	B1G Wide Receiver of the Year	December 15, 2020	
Stevie Scott III	Second Team All-Big Ten Offensive Teams (Coaches)	December 15, 2020	
Michael Penix Jr.	Second Team All-Big Ten Offensive Teams (Coaches)	December 15, 2020	
Ty Fryfogle	Second Team All-Big Ten Offensive Teams (Coaches)	December 15, 2020	
Peyton Hendershot	Third Team All-Big Ten Offensive Teams (Coaches)	December 15, 2020	
Ty Fryfogle	First Team All-Big Ten Offensive Teams (Conference)	December 15, 2020	
Michael Penix Jr.	Second Team All-Big Ten Offensive Teams (Conference)	December 15, 2020	
Stevie Scott III	Second Team All-Big Ten Offensive Teams (Conference)	December 15, 2020	
Peyton Hendershot	Third Team All-Big Ten Offensive Teams (Conference)	December 15, 2020	
Micah McFadden	First Team All-Big Ten Defensive Teams (Coaches)	December 16, 2020	
Jerome Johnson	Second Team All-Big Ten Defensive Teams (Coaches)	December 16, 2020	
Jamar Johnson	Second Team All-Big Ten Defensive Teams (Coaches)	December 16, 2020	
Tiawan Mullen	Second Team All-Big Ten Defensive Teams (Coaches)	December 16, 2020	
Jaylin Williams	Second Team All-Big Ten Defensive Teams (Coaches)	December 16, 2020	
Devon Matthews	Third Team Team All-Big Ten Defensive Teams (Coaches)	December 16, 2020	
Jerome Johnson	First Team All-Big Ten Defensive Teams (Conference)	December 16, 2020	
Micah McFadden	First Team All-Big Ten Defensive Teams (Conference)	December 16, 2020	
Tiawan Mullen	First Team All-Big Ten Defensive Teams (Conference)	December 16, 2020	
Jaylin Williams	Second Team All-Big Ten Defensive Teams (Conference)	December 16, 2020	
Devon Matthews	Third Team Team All-Big Ten Defensive Teams (Conference)	December 16, 2020	
Charles Campbell	Second Team All-Big Ten Special Teams (Coaches)	December 17, 2020	
Tom Allen	Hayes-Schembechler (coaches vote); Dave McClain (media vote); Big Ten Coach of the Year	December 17, 2020	

=== National awards ===
Player	Award	Date Awarded	Ref.
2020 Indiana Hoosiers	Football Writers Association of America's National Team of the Week	October 26, 2020	
Tom Allen	AFCA Coach of the Year Award - Region 3 AFCA Coach of the Year Award - National	December 15, 2020; January 12, 2021	
Ty Fryfogle	Third Team All-American (Associated Press)	December 28, 2020	
Micah McFadden	Third Team All-American (Associated Press)	December 28, 2020	
Tiawan Mullen	First Team All-American (Football Writers Association of America)	December 30, 2020	

== Radio ==
Radio coverage for all games will be broadcast on IUHoosiers.com All-Access and on various radio frequencies throughout the state. The primary radio announcer is long-time broadcaster Don Fischer with Play-by-Play.

== Players drafted into the NFL ==
Round	Pick	Player	Position	NFL club
5	164	Jamar Johnson	S	Denver Broncos
