= Dexter Williams II =

American football player (born 2002)

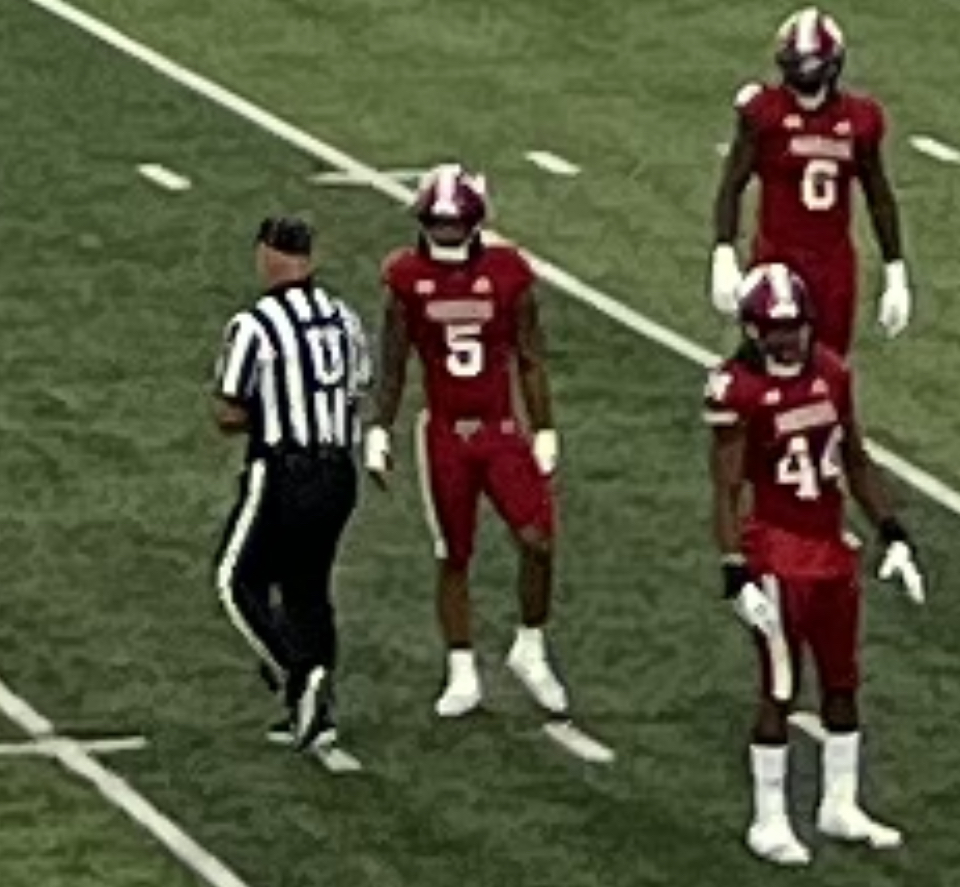
- Williams (center, #5) with Indiana University in 2022

No. 5 – Tulsa Golden Hurricane
- Position: Quarterback
- Class: Graduate

Personal information
- Born: February 1, 2002 (age 24)
- Listed height: 6 ft 1 in (1.85 m)
- Listed weight: 220 lb (100 kg)

Career information
- High school: Mount de Sales Academy (Macon, Georgia)
- College: Indiana (2020–2023); Georgia Southern (2024); Kennesaw State (2025); Tulsa (2026–present)
- Stats at ESPN

Dexter Lee Williams II (born February 1, 2002) is an American college football quarterback for the Tulsa Golden Hurricane. He previously played for the Indiana Hoosiers, Georgia Southern Eagles, and Kennesaw State Owls.

== Early life ==
Williams grew up in Macon, Georgia and attended Mount de Sales Academy. He was rated a three-star recruit and committed to play college football at Indiana over offers from Army, Bucknell, Charlotte, Coastal Carolina, Eastern Kentucky, Florida Atlantic, Georgia Southern, Georgia State, Miami (OH), Navy, Samford, Troy, Tulane, Western Kentucky and Wofford.

== College career ==
=== Indiana ===
Williams redshirted during his true freshman season in 2020 while also enrolling in spring classes and participating in practices. He did not play during the 2021 season due to him suffering an ACL injury he suffered from during the spring. During the 2022 season, he played in four games and started two of them. Williams made his debut against No. 5 Penn State, completing 4 out of 11 passing attempts for 41 yards, along with two interceptions. Williams suffered a leg injury with 46 seconds left in the first quarter against Purdue as a non-contact injury. He finished the season with 13 out of 38 passing attempts for 184 yards and two interceptions. Williams entered the transfer portal on November 27, 2023.

=== Georgia Southern ===
Williams transferred to Georgia Southern for the 2024 season.

=== Kennesaw State ===
On December 18, 2024, Williams transferred to Kennesaw State Owls.

=== Statistics ===
Year	Team	Games			Passing								Rushing			
Year	Team	GP	GS	Record	Cmp	Att	Pct	Yds	Y/A	TD	Int	Rtg	Att	Yds	Avg	TD
2020	Indiana	0	0	—	Redshirted (redshirt)											
2021	Indiana	0	0	—	DNP (injury—ACL)											
2022	Indiana	4	2	1–1	13	38	34.2	184	4.8	2	2	81.7	40	165	4.1	1
2023	Indiana	0	0	—	DNP (injury—rehabbing knee)											
2024	Georgia Southern	5	0	—	19	30	63.3	248	8.3	3	0	165.8	13	45	3.5	1
2025	Kennesaw State	8	4	2–2	67	125	53.6	787	6.3	6	3	117.5	41	153	3.7	3
2026	Tulsa	2	1	1–0	14	27	51.9	164	6.1	3	0	139.5	5	6	1.2	0
Career		19	7	4–3	113	220	51.4	1,383	6.3	14	5	120.6	99	369	3.7	5
