= Ty Fryfogle =

American football player (born 1999)

Profile
- Position: Wide receiver

Personal information
- Born: January 28, 1999 (age 27); Lucedale, Mississippi, U.S.
- Listed height: 6 ft 2 in (1.88 m)
- Listed weight: 205 lb (93 kg)

Career information
- High school: George County (Lucedale)
- College: Indiana (2017–2021)
- NFL draft: 2022: undrafted

Career history
- Dallas Cowboys (2022)*; Kansas City Chiefs (2023)*; San Antonio Brahmas (2025)*
- * Offseason or practice squad member only

Awards and highlights
- Big Ten Receiver of the Year (2020); First-team All-Big Ten (2020)
- Stats at Pro Football Reference

Ty Fryfogle (born January 28, 1999) is an American football wide receiver. He played college football for the Indiana Hoosiers.

== Early life ==
Fryfogle grew up in Lucedale, Mississippi and attended George County High School. As a senior, he caught 89 passes for 1,430 yards and 13 touchdowns and was named first-team all-state. Fryfogle committed to play college football at Indiana over Ole Miss and Idaho.

== College career ==
Despite initially considering redshirting, Fryfogle played in eight games as a true freshman, catching one pass for 13 yards. He had 29 receptions for 381 yards with three touchdowns in his sophomore season. As a junior, Fryfogle caught 45 passes for 604 yards and three touchdowns. He was named the Big Ten Conference Offensive Player of the Week on November 14, 2020, after catching 11 passes for 200 yards and two touchdowns against Michigan State.

=== College statistics ===
Year	Team	Games		Receiving			
Year	Team	GP	GS	Rec	Yards	Avg	TD
2017	Indiana	8	0	1	13	13.0	0
2018	Indiana	12	8	29	381	13.1	3
2019	Indiana	13	12	45	604	13.4	3
2020	Indiana	8	7	37	721	19.5	7
2021	Indiana	12	12	46	512	11.1	1
Career		31	31	158	2,231	14.1	14

== Professional career ==
Pre-draft measurables
Height	Weight	Arm length	Hand span	Wingspan	40-yard dash	10-yard split	20-yard split	20-yard shuttle	Three-cone drill	Vertical jump	Broad jump	Bench press
6 ft 1 1/8 in (1.86 m)	204 lb (93 kg)	30 3/4 in (0.78 m)	9 3/4 in (0.25 m)	6 ft 2 5/8 in (1.90 m)	4.53 s	1.59 s	2.68 s	4.47 s	7.15 s	39.0 in (0.99 m)	10 ft 7 in (3.23 m)	13 reps
All values from NFL Combine/Pro Day

=== Dallas Cowboys ===
Fryfogle signed with the Dallas Cowboys as an undrafted free agent on May 3, 2022. He was waived/injured on August 15, and placed on injured reserve. Fryfogle was released on August 23.

=== Kansas City Chiefs ===
On January 9, 2023, Fryfogle signed a reserve/future contract with the Kansas City Chiefs. He was waived by the Chiefs on August 29.

=== San Antonio Brahmas ===
On August 30, 2024, Fryfogle signed with the San Antonio Brahmas of the United Football League (UFL). He was released on March 20, 2025.

== Personal life ==
Fryfogle was born on January 28, 1999, to Jacqueline Bradley and Trey Fryfogle. Fryfogle's father Trey played college football for Ole Miss from 2000 to 2002.

Fryfogle's younger brother, Deuce Knight is a college football quarterback.
