= Charlton Warren =

American football player and coach (born 1977)

Current position
- Title: Co-defensive coordinator, defensive backs coach
- Team: NC State
- Conference: ACC

Biographical details
- Born: January 17, 1977 (age 49); Atlanta, Georgia, U.S.

Playing career
- 1996–1998: Air Force
- Position: Defensive back

Coaching career (HC unless noted)
- 2005–2006: Air Force (GA)
- 2007: Air Force (DB/RC)
- 2008–2011: Air Force (co-DC/DB/RC)
- 2012–2013: Air Force (AHC/DC/RC)
- 2014: Nebraska (DB)
- 2015–2016: North Carolina (DB)
- 2017: Tennessee (DB/ST)
- 2018: Florida (CB)
- 2019–2020: Georgia (DB)
- 2021: Indiana (DC/LB)
- 2022–2023: North Carolina (Co-DC/DB)
- 2024: North Carolina (AHC/DB)
- 2025–present: NC State (co-DC/DB)

Charlton Warren (born January 17, 1977) is an American college football coach who is currently co-defensive coordinator and defensive backs coach at North Carolina State University. Prior to entering the coaching ranks, Warren served in the United States Air Force.

== Playing career ==
Warren grew up in Conley, Georgia, a suburb of Atlanta, and attended Forest Park High School, where he played football and participated in the Air Force Reserve Officer Training Corps. He was recruited by Furman University and the University of Georgia, but chose to attend the United States Air Force Academy in Colorado Springs, Colorado. Warren played defensive back at Air Force and graduated in 1999 with a bachelor's degree in human factors engineering. Following his graduation, he spent a decade on active duty with the United States Air Force. Warren earned an MBA from Georgia College & State University in 2003.

== Coaching career ==
Warren's coaching career began in 2005 as a graduate assistant at Air Force, toward the end of head coach Fisher DeBerry's tenure there. He served as an assistant to Jemal Singleton, who coached the junior varsity team. DeBerry retired after the 2006 season. New head coach Troy Calhoun retained several graduate assistants from DeBerry's staff, including Warren, Singleton, Brian Knorr, and Blane Morgan. Calhoun created the title of "recruiting coordinator" for Warren, recognizing his abilities as a recruiter. In early 2012 Calhoun promoted Warren to defensive coordinator, following Matt Wallerstedt's departure for Texas A&M.

Warren served as co-defensive coordinator alongside Steve Russ for the 2012 and 2013 seasons. Warren recruited the state of Georgia well, but Air Force's defenses ranked among the worst in NCAA Division I Football Bowl Subdivision. In January 2014 Air Force hired Brian Knorr, formerly a fellow graduate assistant and most recently defensive coordinator at Wake Forest, as a defensive coach. It was rumored that Warren would be demoted and Knorr would replace him. Warren chose to depart Air Force and become defensive backs coach at the University of Nebraska under defensive coordinator John Papuchis and head coach Bo Pelini. Knorr stayed at Air Force for all of ten days before taking the defensive coordinator job at Indiana University; Matt Weikert eventually filled the position.

2014 would be Pelini's final season at Nebraska; the school fired him following the conclusion of the regular season. Incoming head coach Mike Riley, long-time head coach at Oregon State, planned to retain Warren alone out of all of Pelini's assistants, citing Warren's skill as a recruiter. Nevertheless, Warren departed in early 2015 for the University of North Carolina in the Atlantic Coast Conference to become defensive backs coach under new defensive coordinator Gene Chizik and head coach Larry Fedora, then in his fourth year. Also new to the staff was Papuchis, serving as linebackers coach.

Warren departed North Carolina after the 2016 season to become the defensive backs coach and special teams coordinator at the University of Tennessee in the Southeastern Conference (SEC) under head coach Butch Jones. Warren replaced Willie Martinez, who had resigned after a disappointing season. Beyond improving the pass defense, there was an expectation that Warren could help recruit the Atlanta area, where a resurgent Georgia until Kirby Smart had made significant inroads. Tennessee fired Jones midway through the 2017 season and hired Jeremy Pruitt to replace him. Pruitt did not retain Warren on his staff, but he was quickly hired by Dan Mullen at the University of Florida, also in the SEC, as the cornerbacks coach.

Warren stayed at Florida for a single season before accepting the defensive backs job at Georgia under Kirby Smart. He replaced Mel Tucker, who departed to take the head coaching job at the University of Colorado. Georgia was Warren's third different school in the SEC in a three-year span. After two seasons at Georgia, Warren departed to become defensive coordinator at Indiana University under Tom Allen. He succeeded Kane Wommack, the new head coach at the University of South Alabama.

Following the departures of former coaches Jay Bateman and Jovan Dewitt, Warren was named co-defensive coordinator and defensive backs coach for North Carolina on January 8, 2022, returning to the Tar Heels alongside Gene Chizik, who will serve as the Assistant Head Coach for Defense and defensive coordinator. After the 2023 season, as the Tar Heel defense continued to struggle, Chizik was let go, and Geoff Collins was hired to replace him. Warren, who had returned to Chapel Hill with Chizik, was retained by coach Mack Brown and elevated to the assistant head coach position.
