= Grant Heard =

American football player and coach (born 1978)

Current position
- Title: Wide Receivers Coach
- Team: Eastern Michigan
- Conference: MAC

Biographical details
- Born: March 4, 1978 (age 48); Lake Jackson, Texas

Playing career
- 1996–2000: Ole Miss
- Position: Wide receiver

Coaching career (HC unless noted)
- 2002: Jackson Prep (MS) (QB/WR/ST)
- 2003: Hargrave (WR)
- 2004: NC State (GA)
- 2005–2006: Ole Miss (GA)
- 2007: Western Michigan (WR)
- 2008–2009: Lambuth (OC)
- 2010–2011: Arkansas State (PGC/QB)
- 2012–2016: Ole Miss (WR)
- 2017–2019: Indiana (PGC/WR)
- 2020–2021: Indiana (co-OC/WR)
- 2022–2023: UCF (WR)
- 2024–present: Eastern Michigan (WR)

Grant Heard (born March 4, 1978) is an American football coach currently serving as the wide receivers coach for Eastern Michigan. He played college football at the University of Mississippi.

== Playing career ==
Heard was a wide receiver for Ole Miss from 1996 to 2000, where he participated in four bowl games and finished his career as the all-time leader in career receptions and touchdowns. He is still among the top ten in career receiving yards, receptions, and touchdowns. He signed with the San Francisco 49ers in 2001, only appearing in the preseason. He signed with the Pittsburgh Steelers in 2002, but was assigned to NFL Europe.

== Coaching career ==
Heard began his coaching career at Jackson Preparatory School in 2002 as the team's quarterbacks, wide receivers, and special teams coach. He spent 2003 as the wide receivers coach at Hargrave Military Academy, where Hargrave had a 8–1 record in his lone season there. He left to be a graduate assistant at NC State in 2004, and left to be a graduate assistant at his alma mater Ole Miss in 2005. He spent two seasons at Ole Miss before leaving to be the wide receivers coach at Western Michigan in 2007. He left to be the offensive coordinator at Lambuth University under Hugh Freeze in 2008. He spent the 2008 and 2009 seasons with the team before leaving to be the passing game coordinator and quarterbacks coach at Arkansas State under newly hired offensive coordinator Freeze. After Freeze was named the head coach at Ole Miss in 2012, Heard followed him to Oxford to be the wide receivers coach for his alma mater. He spent five seasons at Ole Miss, leaving after the 2016 season. Heard was named the passing game coordinator and wide receivers coach on Tom Allen's staff at Indiana in 2017. He was promoted to co-offensive coordinator in 2020. In March 2022, Heard was hired to be the new wide receivers coach at the University of Central Florida, starting in the 2022 season.
