= Harry Crider =

American football player (born 1999)

Profile
- Position: Guard

Personal information
- Born: May 18, 1999 (age 27); Columbus, Indiana, U.S.
- Listed height: 6 ft 4 in (1.93 m)
- Listed weight: 311 lb (141 kg)

Career information
- High school: Columbus East (Columbus, Indiana)
- College: Indiana
- NFL draft: 2021: undrafted

Career history
- Philadelphia Eagles (2021)*; Denver Broncos (2021)*
- * Offseason or practice squad member only
- Stats at Pro Football Reference

Harry Crider (born May 18, 1999) is a former American football guard. He played college football at Indiana.

== Early life and education ==
Harry Crider was born on May 18, 1999, in Columbus, Indiana. He attended Columbus East High School before playing college football at Indiana. He played football, basketball, baseball, and wrestled in high school, earning three letters. He gained numerous honors after his senior season, including: Indiana Football Coaches Association Top 50, Indiana all-state, Indiana Associated Press 6A all-state, Indianapolis Star position award winner (offensive line), USA Today All-USA Indiana team, 2015 IFCA all-state, and team captain. At Indiana, he appeared in 8 games during his freshman year, and 6 in his sophomore year. Crider was named a Big Ten Distinguished Scholar and Academic All-Big Ten selection following his sophomore year. He gained a starting role in his junior year, starting all 13 games (12 at left guard, 1 at center). In his senior season, he started all 8 games at center, and was named honorable mention all–Big 10. He chose to forgo remaining eligibility and instead declare for the 2021 NFL draft.

== Professional career ==
Pre-draft measurables
Height	Weight	Arm length	Hand span	40-yard dash	10-yard split	20-yard split	20-yard shuttle	Three-cone drill	Vertical jump	Broad jump	Bench press
6 ft 2 7/8 in (1.90 m)	307 lb (139 kg)	32 3/4 in (0.83 m)	8 7/8 in (0.23 m)	5.26 s	1.78 s	3.04 s	4.64 s	7.63 s	27.0 in (0.69 m)	8 ft 6 in (2.59 m)	31 reps
All values from Pro Day

=== Philadelphia Eagles ===
After going unselected in the 2021 NFL draft, Crider signed as an undrafted free agent with the Philadelphia Eagles. He was waived on August 23, 2021. He was signed to the practice squad on September 14. He was released by the Eagles on September 21, 2021.

=== Denver Broncos ===
On September 29, 2021, Crider was signed to the Denver Broncos practice squad. He was released on October 5.
