= Tiawan Mullen =

American football player (born 2000)

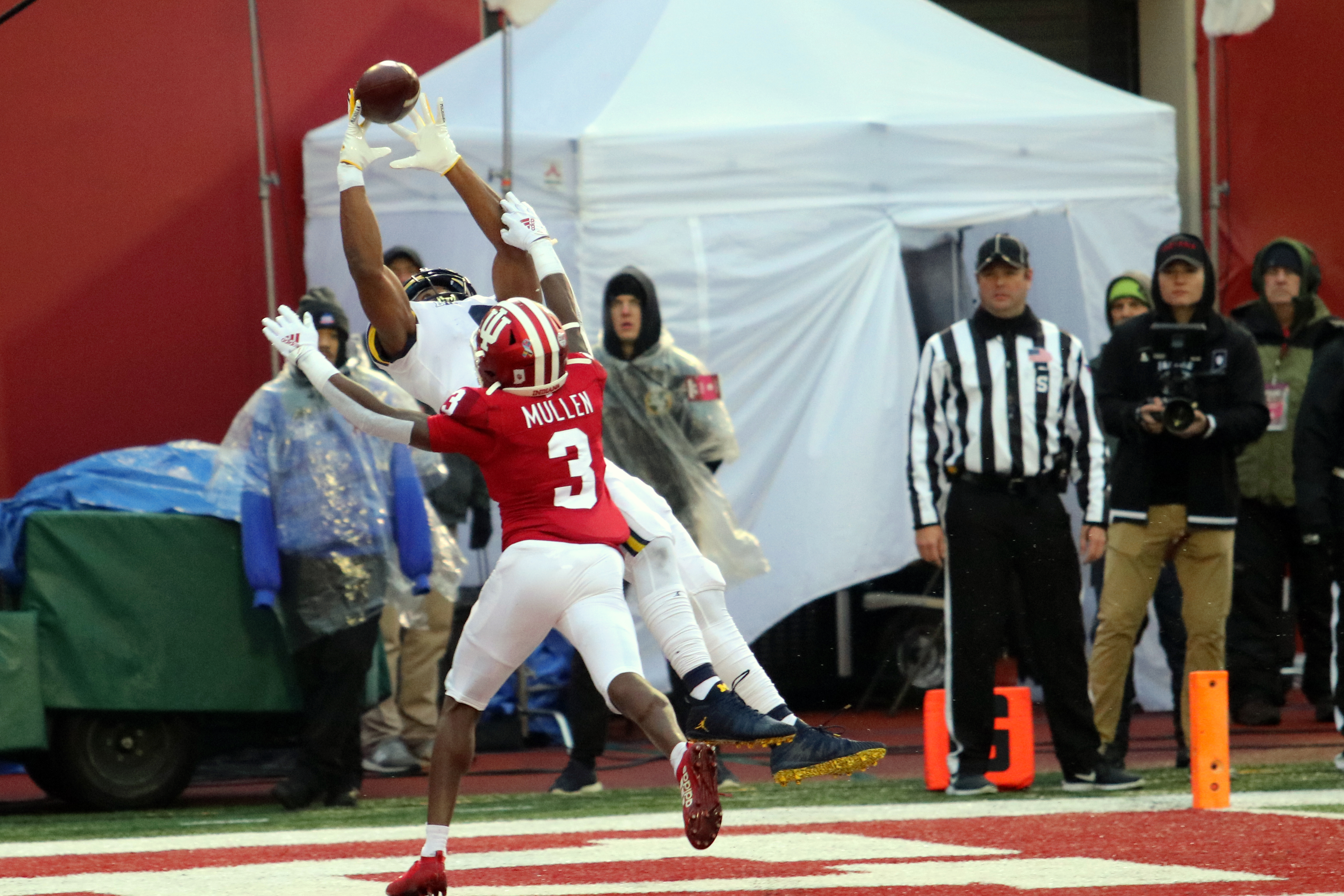
- Mullen (#3) with Indiana in 2019

Profile
- Position: Cornerback

Personal information
- Born: July 12, 2000 (age 26); Fort Lauderdale, Florida, U.S.
- Listed height: 5 ft 10 in (1.78 m)
- Listed weight: 180 lb (82 kg)

Career information
- High school: Coconut Creek (Coconut Creek, Florida)
- College: Indiana (2019–2022)
- NFL draft: 2023: undrafted

Career history
- Los Angeles Chargers (2023)*; Philadelphia Eagles (2023)*; Montreal Alouettes (2025)
- * Offseason or practice squad member only

Awards and highlights
- First-team All-American (2020)
- Stats at Pro Football Reference

Tiawan Mullen (born July 12, 2000) is an American professional football cornerback. He played college football for the Indiana Hoosiers.

== Early life ==
Tiawan Mullen was born on July 12, 2000, in Fort Lauderdale, Florida. He attended Coconut Creek High School in Coconut Creek, Florida, and was team captain for three years. An honor roll student, Mullen was named first-team All-County as a senior and compiled 112 career tackles. He also recorded 13 career interceptions, three returned for touchdowns, and forced five fumbles.

== College career ==
Mullen received several scholarship offers after high school, including from Indiana, Nebraska, and Pittsburgh. He accepted an offer from Indiana University in September 2018. He saw immediate playing time as true freshman in 2019, placing second nationally among freshmen with 13 pass breakups. He was a starter in eight out of the team's thirteen games, and made 29 tackles, two forced fumbles, and two recoveries. Following the season Mullen was named honorable mention All-Big Ten, first-team The Athletic Freshman All-American, and Indiana's defensive newcomer of the year.

As a sophomore in 2020, Mullen made 38 tackles, 3.5 sacks, three interceptions, and four pass breakups and was named first-team All-American at the end of the season. He also was named Indiana's most outstanding defensive player of the year, and was a first-team All-Big Ten selection. In the 2021 season, Mullen appeared in the first six games, making 19 tackles, before being sidelined with an injury.

== Professional career ==
Pre-draft measurables
Height	Weight	Arm length	Hand span	40-yard dash	10-yard split	20-yard split	20-yard shuttle	Three-cone drill	Vertical jump	Broad jump	Bench press
5 ft 8 1/2 in (1.74 m)	181 lb (82 kg)	30 3/8 in (0.77 m)	8 1/4 in (0.21 m)	4.42 s	1.56 s	2.55 s	4.41 s	7.00 s	32.0 in (0.81 m)	10 ft 0 in (3.05 m)	19 reps
All values from Pro Day

=== Los Angeles Chargers ===
Mullen signed with the Los Angeles Chargers as an undrafted free agent on April 29, 2023. He was waived on August 29.

=== Philadelphia Eagles ===
On August 31, 2023, Mullen was signed to the Philadelphia Eagles' practice squad. He was released on October 25. Mullen signed a reserve/future contract with the Eagles on January 18, 2024. He was waived on April 30.

=== Montreal Alouettes ===
On January 1, 2025, Mullen signed with the Montreal Alouettes of the Canadian Football League. He was released on July 15.

== Personal life ==
Mullen's brother, Trayvon, is a free agent cornerback, last playing for the Baltimore Ravens. Another brother, Trevell, was teammates with Tiawan at Indiana. His cousin, Lamar Jackson, is a starting quarterback for the Baltimore Ravens and was named NFL MVP.
