= Kahlil Benson =

American football player (born 2002)

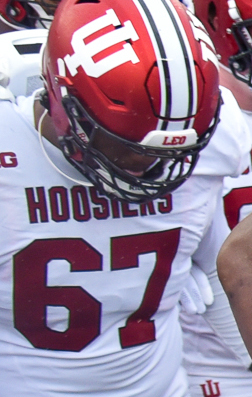
- Benson in 2023

No. 70 – Kansas City Chiefs
- Position: Offensive tackle
- Roster status: Active

Personal information
- Born: August 30, 2002 (age 24); Memphis, Tennessee, U.S.
- Listed height: 6 ft 6 in (1.98 m)
- Listed weight: 319 lb (145 kg)

Career information
- High school: Southaven (Southaven, Mississippi)
- College: Indiana (2020–2023, 2025); Colorado (2024)
- NFL draft: 2026: undrafted

Career history
- Kansas City Chiefs (2026–present)

Awards and highlights
- CFP national champion (2025)

Career NFL statistics as of Week 10, 2026
- Games played: 9
- Games started: 9
- Stats at Pro Football Reference

Kahlil Benson (born August 30, 2002) is an American professional football offensive tackle for the Kansas City Chiefs of the National Football League (NFL). He played college football for the Indiana Hoosiers and Colorado Buffaloes.

== Early life ==
Benson was born August 30, 2002, in Memphis, Tennessee. He attended Southaven High School in Southaven, Mississippi, where he competed in football and track and field. In his senior year, Benson was named a team captain and earned first-team all-state honors. He was ranked as a three-star college football prospect by ESPN, 247Sports, and Rivals.com. Benson was named the most outstanding offensive lineman out of 240 prospects who attended the Southern Elite Combine in 2019. He initially committed to play college football for the Ole Miss Rebels, but following a head coaching change at Ole Miss, he instead opted to play for the Indiana Hoosiers; though considered an offensive guard prospect by 247Sports, Indiana recruited him to play offensive tackle.

== College career ==
Benson joined the Indiana Hoosiers football team in 2020. He missed the 2020 season after sustaining a torn anterior cruciate ligament during a preseason practice, taking a redshirt for the season. He did not play in any games in 2021. In 2022, Benson played in all 12 games, at first on special teams, but ultimately starting in five games at right guard. He started in all 12 games of 2023, now playing right tackle and allowing only one sack on 424 pass attempts.

After head coach Tom Allen was fired following the 2023 season, Benson transferred to play for the Colorado Buffaloes, stepping into a leadership role on an offensive line unit that allowed 56 sacks the previous season. Benson played right tackle, right guard, and left guard in his season at Colorado, playing in nine games with four starts while missing four games, including the 2024 Alamo Bowl, due to injuries. He transferred back to the Indiana Hoosiers for the 2025 season.

Initially projected to play right guard in his second stint at Indiana, and despite missing spring training camp due to an undisclosed injury sustained at Colorado, head coach Curt Cignetti announced Benson would start at right tackle in 2025. Benson did not appear in the first half of the game against the Indiana State Sycamores for disciplinary reasons that Cignetti called a "[v]iolation of team rules and regulations". Indiana finished the season with a win in the 2026 College Football Playoff National Championship.

== Professional career ==
Pre-draft measurables
Height	Weight	Arm length	Hand span	Wingspan	40-yard dash	10-yard split	20-yard split	20-yard shuttle	Three-cone drill	Vertical jump	Broad jump	Bench press
6 ft 5 7/8 in (1.98 m)	321 lb (146 kg)	34 5/8 in (0.88 m)	10 1/4 in (0.26 m)	6 ft 9 3/4 in (2.08 m)	5.09 s	1.80 s	2.94 s	4.78 s	7.80 s	30.5 in (0.77 m)	9 ft 1 in (2.77 m)	23 reps
All values from Pro Day

Benson was not selected in the 2026 NFL draft. On May 4, 2026, he signed with the Kansas City Chiefs as an undrafted free agent after participating in the Chiefs' rookie minicamp.

Benson made his NFL debut in the Chiefs' starting lineup in the first game of the 2026 season against the Denver Broncos. He played at left tackle, a position he never played in college; it was the first time in head coach Andy Reid's 13-year tenure with the Chiefs that an undrafted rookie started in the first game of a season for the team. Benson allowed only one quarterback pressure in the game. The following week, he started in the same position against the Indianapolis Colts and received the highest Pro Football Focus grade of all offensive rookies for the week. After starting again in week 3, Benson was named the NFL's offensive rookie of the month, the first offensive lineman to win the award since 2018.

== Personal life ==
Benson's cousin, Kevin Elliott, played football professionally for the Jacksonville Jaguars and Buffalo Bills of the National Football League (NFL).

During his time with the Colorado Buffaloes, Benson created a popular social media hashtag, #DT2, meaning "Don't Touch 2". It referred to the Colorado offensive line's commitment to protecting quarterback Shedeur Sanders, who wore jersey number 2, from opposing defenses.

Benson earned a bachelor's degree in sociology from the University of Colorado Boulder. He is a member of Omega Psi Phi.
