= Nick Sheridan =

American football player and coach (born 1988)

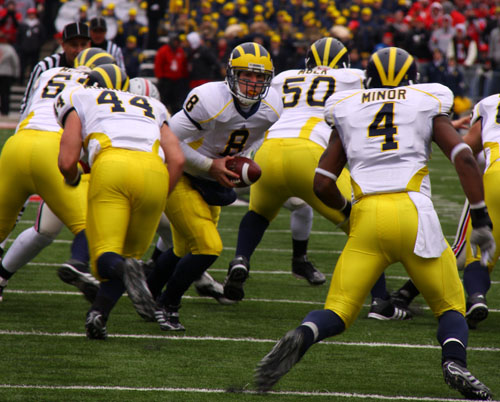
- Sheridan (No. 8) in 2008

Current position
- Title: Offensive coordinator
- Team: Michigan State
- Conference: Big Ten

Biographical details
- Born: May 21, 1988 (age 38); Maine, U.S.

Playing career
- 2006–2009: Michigan
- Position: Quarterback

Coaching career (HC unless noted)
- 2010: Saline HS (MI) (QB)
- 2011: Western Kentucky (GA)
- 2012: Western Kentucky (PGC/QB)
- 2013: South Florida (PGC/QB)
- 2014–2016: Tennessee (GA)
- 2017–2018: Indiana (QB)
- 2019: Indiana (TE)
- 2020–2021: Indiana (OC/QB)
- 2022–2023: Washington (TE)
- 2024: Alabama (OC/QB)
- 2025: Alabama (co-OC/QB)
- 2026–present: Michigan State (OC)

Nick William Sheridan (born May 21, 1988) is an American college football coach and former quarterback. He currently serves as the offensive coordinator for the Michigan State Spartans, a position he has held since 2026. He previously served as the tight ends coach at the University of Washington and was the offensive coordinator and quarterbacks coach at the University of Alabama, and Indiana University. He played at the University of Michigan.

== Playing career ==
Sheridan walked on at Michigan as a quarterback in 2006. He earned a scholarship his junior year, and started four games in 2008. Sheridan graduated from Michigan in 2010 with a degree in political science.

== Coaching career ==
After graduating from Michigan, Sheridan took a coaching position at his alma mater, Saline High School. He coached quarterbacks at Saline for one year before leaving to join Willie Taggart's coaching staff at Western Kentucky as a graduate assistant in 2011. He was promoted to passing coordinator and quarterbacks coach in 2012. He served in that same capacity at South Florida in 2013 after Taggart was named the head coach there. He was fired after one season at South Florida along with South Florida offensive coordinator Walt Wells. He was hired to be a graduate assistant at Tennessee in 2014 following his termination from South Florida. He coached at Tennessee for four seasons before being named the quarterbacks coach at Indiana in 2017. He switched to the tight ends coach in 2019 after offensive coordinator and tight ends coach Mike DeBord retired and Fresno State offensive coordinator Kalen DeBoer was named the offensive coordinator and quarterbacks coach. He was named the offensive coordinator and quarterbacks coach for the 2020 season after DeBoer departed to be the head coach at Fresno State.

Sheridan was terminated by Indiana on November 28, 2021.

Sheridan was hired by the Washington Huskies on December 14, 2021, as their new tight ends coach.

On February 20, 2024, it was announced that Sheridan would be following Kalen DeBoer from Washington to Alabama to become the team's new offensive coordinator and quarterbacks coach.

== Personal life ==
Sheridan is the son of Bill Sheridan, a longtime football coach who was the defensive coordinator of the Tampa Bay Buccaneers and is currently the linebackers coach for the Arlington Renegades. Nick was born in Maine during the time when his father was a coach for the Maine Black Bears football team. Sheridan and his wife, Sarah, have three children.
