= Micah McFadden =

American football player (born 2000)

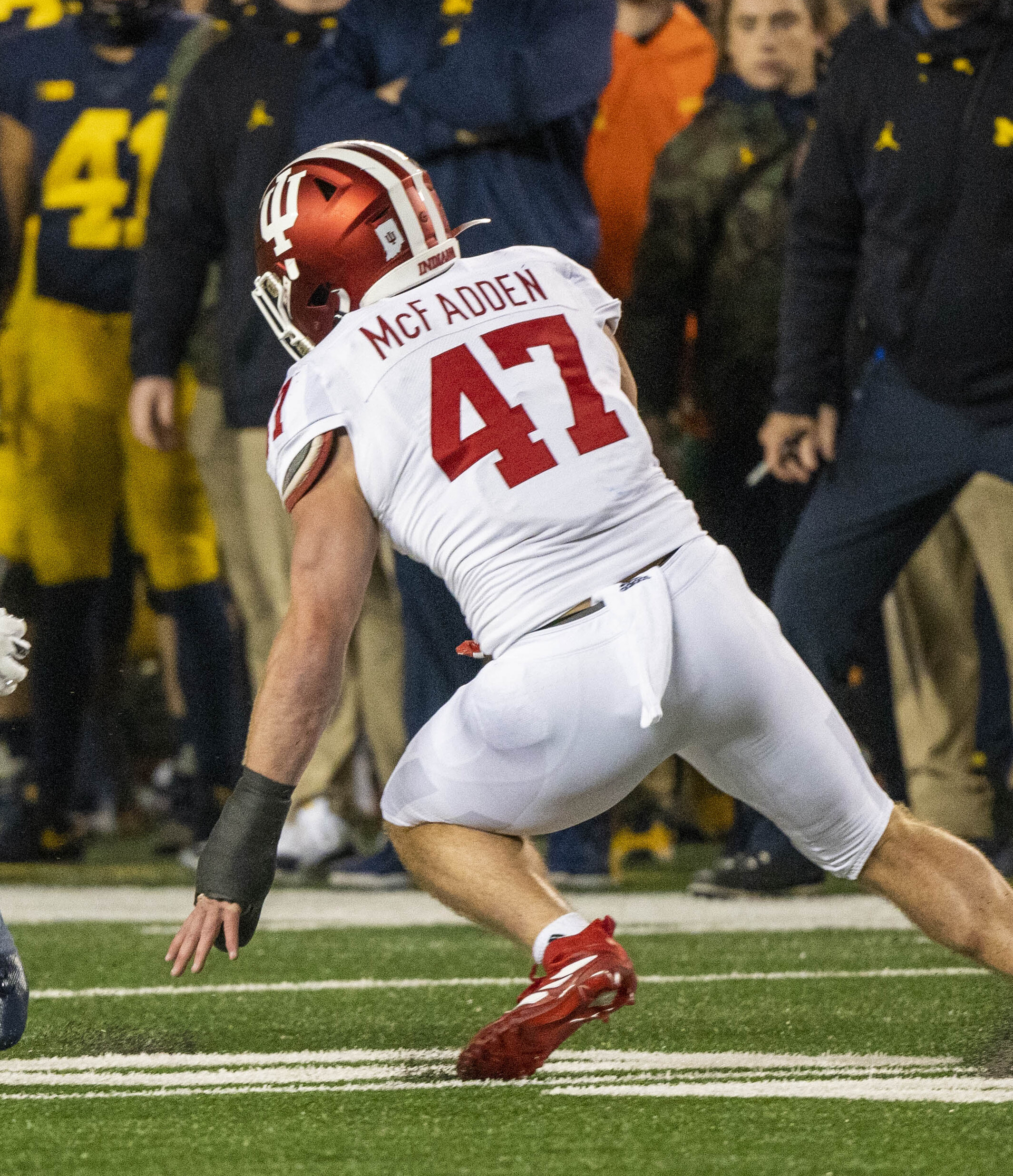
- McFadden with Indiana in 2021

No. 41 – New York Giants
- Position: Linebacker
- Roster status: Active

Personal information
- Born: January 3, 2000 (age 26); Tampa, Florida, U.S.
- Listed height: 6 ft 2 in (1.88 m)
- Listed weight: 232 lb (105 kg)

Career information
- High school: Henry B. Plant (South Tampa, Florida)
- College: Indiana (2018–2021)
- NFL draft: 2022: 5th round, 146th overall pick

Career history
- New York Giants (2022–present)

Awards and highlights
- First-team All-Big Ten (2020); Second-team All-Big Ten (2021)

Career NFL statistics as of Week 5, 2026
- Total tackles: 273
- Sacks: 6
- Pass deflections: 6
- Interceptions: 1
- Forced fumbles: 2
- Fumble recoveries: 5
- Stats at Pro Football Reference

Micah McFadden (born January 3, 2000) is an American professional football linebacker for the New York Giants of the National Football League (NFL). He played college football for the Indiana Hoosiers.

== Early life ==
McFadden played at Plant High School in Tampa, Florida under head coach Robert Weiner. As a senior in high school, McFadden was named first-team all-state. He was a three-star recruit.

== College career ==
McFadden played for the Indiana Hoosiers as a linebacker. As a freshman, he played 12 games and had 20 tackles and a forced fumble. As a sophomore, his role increased and had a combined 61 tackles, two interceptions and a forced fumble. McFadden was named IU’s Most Outstanding Defensive Player of the Year. As a junior, he led the team in tackles with 58, had six sacks and grabbed two interceptions. McFadden was honored as Indiana’s Anthony Thompson Most Valuable Player. As a senior he had 77 tackles, 6.5 sacks, two forced fumbles and one fumble recovery.

== Professional career ==
Pre-draft measurables
Height	Weight	Arm length	Hand span	Wingspan	40-yard dash	10-yard split	20-yard split	20-yard shuttle	Three-cone drill	Vertical jump	Broad jump	Bench press
6 ft 1 1/8 in (1.86 m)	240 lb (109 kg)	31 1/4 in (0.79 m)	9 1/2 in (0.24 m)	6 ft 2 3/4 in (1.90 m)	4.63 s	1.54 s	2.62 s	4.15 s	6.88 s	35.0 in (0.89 m)	9 ft 10 in (3.00 m)	21 reps
All values from NFL Combine/Pro Day

The New York Giants selected McFadden in the fifth round (146th overall) of the 2022 NFL draft. McFadden was the 14th linebacker drafted in 2022. The New York Giants acquired the pick used to draft McFadden in a trade that sent their original third round pick (36th overall) to the New York Jets for a third (38th overall) and fifth round pick (146th overall) in the 2022 NFL Draft. On May 13, 2022, the New York Giants signed McFadden to a four-year, $4.01 million contract that includes a signing bonus of $355,708. In Week 8 against the Seattle Seahawks, McFadden recorded his first career sack against quarterback Geno Smith in a 27–13 loss.

On September 9, 2025, it was announced that McFadden would miss 'significant time' due to foot surgery; the injury occurred in the team's season opener, when McFadden made a tackle on Washington Commanders quarterback Jayden Daniels.

On March 11, 2026, McFadden re-signed with the Giants on a one-year, $3.75 million contract.

== NFL career statistics ==
=== Regular season ===
Year	Team	Games		Tackles						Interceptions						Fumbles			
Year	Team	GP	GS	Cmb	Solo	Ast	Sck	TFL	QBHits	PD	Int	Yds	Avg	Lng	TD	FF	FR	Yds	TD
2022	NYG	17	7	59	36	23	2.0	6	2	0	0	0	0	0	0	1	0	0	0
2023	NYG	16	14	101	63	38	1.0	12	6	5	1	5	5	5	0	0	4	10	0
2024	NYG	14	14	107	60	47	3.0	8	6	1	0	0	0	0	1	1	0	0	0
2025	NYG	1	1	3	2	1	0.0	0	1	0	0	0	0	0	0	0	0	0	0
2026	NYG	4	0	3	1	2	0.0	0	0	0	0	0	0	0	0	0	0	0	0
Career		52	36	273	162	111	6.0	26	15	6	1	5	5	5	0	2	5	10	0
