= 2022 Big Ten Conference football season =

- League: NCAA Division I Football Bowl Subdivision
- Sport: Football
- Duration: August 27, 2022 through January 1, 2023
- Teams: 14
- TV partner(s): Fox Sports (Fox/FS1, Big Ten Network), ESPN (ESPN, ESPN2, ABC)

2023 NFL draft
- Top draft pick: C. J. Stroud, QB, Ohio State
- Picked by: Houston Texans, 2nd overall

Regular season
- Season MVP: Blake Corum, RB, Michigan
- East Division champions: Michigan
- West Division champions: Purdue

Championship Game
- Champions: Michigan
- Runners-up: Purdue
- Finals MVP: Donovan Edwards, RB, Michigan

Football seasons
- 2021 2023

2022 Big Ten Conference football standings
	Conf.			Overall
Team	W		L	W		L
East Division
No. 3 Michigan xy$^	9	–	0	13	–	1
No. 4 Ohio State ^	8	–	1	11	–	2
No. 7 Penn State	7	–	2	11	–	2
Maryland	4	–	5	8	–	5
Indiana	2	–	7	4	–	8
Rutgers	1	–	8	4	–	8
Michigan State†	0	–	6	0	–	7
West Division
Purdue xy	6	–	3	8	–	6
Illinois	5	–	4	8	–	5
Iowa	5	–	4	8	–	5
Minnesota	5	–	4	9	–	4
Wisconsin	4	–	5	7	–	6
Nebraska	3	–	6	4	–	8
Northwestern	1	–	8	1	–	11
Championship: Michigan 43, Purdue 22
^ – College Football Playoff participant; $ – Conference champion; x – Division champion/co-champions; y – Championship game participant; † — NCAA vacated all wins for Michigan State (5–7, 3–6); Rankings from AP Poll

The 2022 Big Ten conference football season was the 127th season of college football play for the Big Ten Conference and part of the 2022 NCAA Division I FBS football season. This was the Big Ten's ninth season with 14 teams. This was the Big Ten's final season broadcasting on ABC Sports properties.

== Coaching changes ==
There were no head coaching changes amongst Big Ten programs before the 2022 season. On September 11, Nebraska fired head coach Scott Frost three games into the season and named Mickey Joseph the interim for the remainder of the season.

On October 2, Wisconsin fired head coach Paul Chryst, five games into the Badgers' season and named defensive coordinator Jim Leonhard as interim head coach.

Nebraska named Matt Rhule the 31st head coach in program history on November 26, 2022, one day after finishing their 2022 season.

On November 27, 2022, one day after finishing their respective season, Wisconsin announced the hiring of Luke Fickell to become the Badgers' 31st coach in program history.

On December 8, 2022, Jeff Brohm announced he was leaving Purdue to return to his alma mater, Louisville. On December 13, the Boilermakers announced the hiring of Illinois defensive coordinator Ryan Walters as their next head coach.

== Preseason ==
=== Recruiting classes ===
Rankings
Team	ESPN	Rivals	Scout & 24/7	Signees
Illinois	54	38	46	26
Indiana	24	15	21	22
Iowa	47	28	30	18
Maryland	39	35	31	21
Michigan	8	9	9	22
Michigan State	16	22	23	23
Minnesota	45	49	49	18
Nebraska	61	38	41	18
Northwestern	46	54	47	16
Ohio State	4	4	4	21
Penn State	6	6	6	25
Purdue	38	32	37	20
Rutgers	27	43	33	19
Wisconsin	42	46	45	15

=== Big Ten Media Days ===
==== Preseason Media Poll ====
The annual Cleveland.com Preseason Big Ten Media Poll.

East
Predicted finish	Team	Points (1st place votes)
1	Ohio State	252 (36)
2	Michigan	203
3	Penn State	169
4	Michigan State	162
5	Maryland	104
6	Rutgers	60
7	Indiana	58

West
Predicted finish	Team	Points (1st place votes)
1	Wisconsin	246 (31)
2	Iowa	198 (3)
3	Minnesota	162 (2)
4	Purdue	153
5	Nebraska	123
6	Illinois	65
7	Northwestern	61

Media poll (Big Ten Championship)
Rank	Team	Votes
1	Ohio State over Wisconsin	31
2	Ohio State over Iowa	3
3	Ohio State over Minnesota	2

==== Preseason Player of the Year ====
Below are the results of the annual Preseason Big Ten Player of the Year awards conducted by Cleveland.com.

Preseason Offensive Player of the Year
Rank	Player	Position	Team	Points (1st place votes)
1	C. J. Stroud	QB	Ohio State	101 (32)
2	Jaxon Smith-Njigba	WR	Ohio State	42 (2)
3	Braelon Allen	RB	Wisconsin	37
4	Blake Corum	RB	Michigan	8
5	Aidan O'Connell	QB	Purdue	7
6	TreVeyon Henderson	RB	Ohio State	5
7	Taulia Tagovailoa	QB	Maryland	4 (1)
8	Mohamed Ibrahim	RB	Minnesota	3
9T	Rakim Jarrett	WR	Maryland	1
9T	Payton Thorne	QB	Michigan State	1
9T	Jayden Reed	WR	Michigan State	1

Preseason Defensive Player of the Year
Rank	Player	Position	Team	Points (1st place votes)
1	Jack Campbell	LB	Iowa	74 (20)
2	Nick Herbig	LB	Wisconsin	55 (10)
3	Zach Harrison	DE	Ohio State	26 (4)
4	Riley Moss	CB	Iowa	20 (1)
5	Joey Porter Jr.	CB	Penn State	8
6	Ji'Ayir Brown	S	Penn State	7
7T	Denzel Burke	CB	Ohio State	3
7T	Tiawan Mullen	CB	Indiana	3
7T	Garrett Nelson	LB	Nebraska	3
7T	JT Tuimoloau	DE	Ohio State	3
11T	Junior Colson	LB	Michigan	2
11T	Ronnie Hickman	S	Ohio State	2
11T	P. J. Mustipher	DT	Penn State	2
14T	Xavier Henderson	S	Michigan State	1
14T	Adam Korsak	P	Rutgers	1

=== Preseason awards ===
==== All−American Teams ====
	AP 1st Team	AP 2nd Team	AS 1st Team	AS 2nd Team	WCFF 1st Team	WCFF 2nd Team	ESPN	CBS 1st Team	CBS 2nd Team	CFN 1st Team	CFN 2nd Team	PFF 1st Team	PFF 2nd Team	SN 1st Team	SN 2nd Team
Adam Korsak, P, Rutgers	✓		✓		✓			✓						✓	
Blake Corum, RB, Michigan						✓							✓	✓	
Braelon Allen, RB, Wisconsin		✓		✓							✓				✓
Charlie Jones, WR/PR, Purdue						✓									
C. J. Stroud, QB, Ohio State		✓		✓					✓		✓				
Dawand Jones, OT, Ohio State		✓							✓			✓			
Jack Campbell, LB, Iowa	✓		✓					✓		✓				✓	
Jacob Slade, DL, Michigan State						✓									
Jake Moody, K, Michigan	✓			✓	✓			✓					✓	✓	
Jaxon Smith-Njigba, WR, Ohio State	✓		✓		✓		✓	✓		✓		✓		✓	
Jayden Reed, WR/PR, Michigan State				✓									✓		✓
John Michael Schmitz, OL, Minnesota		✓	✓			✓	✓		✓				✓		
Noah Ruggles, K, Ohio State						✓									✓
Nick Herbig, LB, Wisconsin		✓											✓		
Olusegun Oluwatimi, OL, Michigan						✓				✓					✓
Paris Johnson Jr., OL, Ohio State	✓			✓			✓	✓							✓
Peter Skoronski, OL, Northwestern	✓		✓		✓		✓	✓		✓		✓		✓	
Riley Moss, CB, Iowa	✓		✓			✓	✓	✓						✓	
Ryan Hayes, OT, Michigan											✓				
Tory Taylor, P, Iowa				✓											
TreVeyon Henderson, RB, Ohio State	✓			✓	✓		✓	✓		✓			✓	✓	
Zach Harrison, DL, Ohio State				✓											

==== Individual awards ====
Award	Head Coach/Player	School	Position	Year	Ref
Lott Trophy	Jack Campbell	Iowa	LB	Jr.	
Lott Trophy	Riley Moss	Iowa	DB	Sr.	
Lott Trophy	Xavier Henderson	Michigan State	S	Sr.	
Lott Trophy	Luke Reimer	Nebraska	LB	Jr.	
Lott Trophy	Ronnie Hickman	Ohio State	S	Jr.	
Lott Trophy	Zach Harrison	Ohio State	DE	Sr.	
Lott Trophy	Joey Porter Jr.	Penn State	CB	Jr.	
Lott Trophy	Nick Herbig	Wisconsin	LB	Jr.	
Dodd Trophy	Kirk Ferentz	Iowa	HC	—	
Dodd Trophy	Jim Harbaugh	Michigan	HC	—	
Dodd Trophy	Mel Tucker	Michigan State	HC	—	
Dodd Trophy	Ryan Day	Ohio State	HC	—	
Maxwell Award	Chase Brown	Illinois	RB	Jr.	
Maxwell Award	Blake Corum	Michigan	RB	Jr.	
Maxwell Award	Payton Thorne	Michigan State	QB	Jr.	
Maxwell Award	Jayden Reed	Michigan State	WR	Sr.	
Maxwell Award	Mohamed Ibrahim	Minnesota	RB	Sr.	
Maxwell Award	Evan Hull	Northwestern	RB		
Maxwell Award	C. J. Stroud	Ohio State	QB	So.	
Maxwell Award	Jaxon Smith-Njigba	Ohio State	WR	Jr.	
Maxwell Award	TreVeyon Henderson	Ohio State	RB	So.	
Maxwell Award	Sean Clifford	Penn State	QB	Sr.	
Maxwell Award	Aidan O'Connell	Purdue	QB	Sr.	
Maxwell Award	Braelon Allen	Wisconsin	RB	So.	
Davey O'Brien Award	Taulia Tagovailoa	Maryland	QB	(redshirt) Jr.	
Davey O'Brien Award	Payton Thorne	Michigan State	QB	(redshirt) Jr.	
Davey O'Brien Award	C. J. Stroud	Ohio State	QB	So.	
Davey O'Brien Award	Sean Clifford	Penn State	QB	Sr.	
Davey O'Brien Award	Aidan O'Connell	Purdue	QB	Sr.	
Doak Walker Award	Chase Brown	Illinois	RB	Jr.	
Doak Walker Award	Shaun Shivers	Indiana	RB	Sr.	
Doak Walker Award	Blake Corum	Michigan	RB	Jr.	
Doak Walker Award	Jarek Broussard	Michigan State	RB	Sr.	
Doak Walker Award	Mohamed Ibrahim	Minnesota	RB	Sr.	
Doak Walker Award	TreVeyon Henderson	Ohio State	RB	So.	
Doak Walker Award	Evan Hull	Northwestern	RB	Jr.	
Doak Walker Award	Keyvone Lee	Penn State	RB	So.	
Doak Walker Award	Braelon Allen	Wisconsin	RB	So.	
Doak Walker Award	Chez Mellusi	Wisconsin	RB	Sr.	
Biletnikoff Award	Rakim Jarrett	Maryland	WR	Jr.	
Biletnikoff Award	Jayden Reed	Michigan State	WR	Sr.	
Biletnikoff Award	Jaxon Smith-Njigba	Ohio State	WR	Jr.	
Biletnikoff Award	Mitchell Tinsley	Penn State	WR	Sr.	
Biletnikoff Award	Parker Washington	Penn State	WR	Jr.	

Award	Head Coach/Player	School	Position	Year	Ref
John Mackey Award	Luke Ford	Illinois	TE	Sr.	
John Mackey Award	Erick All	Michigan	TE	Sr.	
John Mackey Award	Luke Schoonmaker	Michigan	TE	(redshirt) Graduate	
John Mackey Award	Brevyn Spann-Ford	Minnesota	TE	Sr.	
John Mackey Award	Brenton Strange	Penn State	TE	(redshirt) Jr.	
John Mackey Award	Theo Johnson	Penn State	TE	So.	
John Mackey Award	Payne Durham	Purdue	TE	(redshirt) Sr.	
Rimington Trophy	Olusegun Oluwatimi	Michigan	OL	(redshirt) Graduate	
Rimington Trophy	John Michael Schmitz	Minnesota	OL	Sr.	
Rimington Trophy	Luke Wypler	Ohio State	OL	Jr.	
Rimington Trophy	Juice Scruggs	Penn State	OL	(redshirt) Sr.	
Rimington Trophy	Gus Hartwig	Purdue	OL	(redshirt) So.	
Rimington Trophy	Joe Tippmann	Wisconsin	OL	Jr.	
Butkus Award	Jack Campbell	Iowa	LB	Sr.	
Butkus Award	Jestin Jacobs	Iowa	LB	Jr.	
Butkus Award	Seth Benson	Iowa	LB	Sr.	
Butkus Award	Calvin Hart Jr.	Illinois	LB	Jr.	
Butkus Award	Luke Reimer	Nebraska	LB	Jr.	
Butkus Award	Mariano Sori-Marin	Minnesota	LB	(redshirt) Graduate	
Jim Thorpe Award	Riley Moss	Iowa	DB	Sr.	
Jim Thorpe Award	Xavier Henderson	Michigan State	DB	Sr.	
Jim Thorpe Award	Denzel Burke	Ohio State	DB	So.	
Jim Thorpe Award	Ronnie Hickman	Ohio State	DB	Sr.	
Bronko Nagurski Trophy	Jack Campbell	Iowa	LB	Jr.	
Bronko Nagurski Trophy	Riley Moss	Iowa	DB	Sr.	
Bronko Nagurski Trophy	Xavier Henderson	Michigan State	S	Sr.	
Bronko Nagurski Trophy	Ochaun Mathis	Nebraska	LB	(redshirt) Jr.	
Bronko Nagurski Trophy	Ronnie Hickman	Ohio State	S	Jr.	
Bronko Nagurski Trophy	Zach Harrison	Ohio State	DE	Sr.	
Bronko Nagurski Trophy	Joey Porter Jr.	Penn State	CB	Jr.	
Bronko Nagurski Trophy	P. J. Mustipher	Penn State	DT	Sr.	
Bronko Nagurski Trophy	Keeanu Benton	Wisconsin	DT	Sr.	
Bronko Nagurski Trophy	Nick Herbig	Wisconsin	LB	Jr.	
Outland Trophy	Alex Palczewski	Illinois	OL	Sr.	
Outland Trophy	Olusegun Oluwatimi	Michigan	OL	(redshirt) Graduate	
Outland Trophy	Zak Zinter	Michigan	OL	Jr.	
Outland Trophy	John Michael Schmitz	Minnesota	OL	Sr.	
Outland Trophy	Peter Skoronski	Northwestern	OL	Jr.	
Outland Trophy	Dawand Jones	Ohio State	OL	Sr.	
Outland Trophy	Paris Johnson Jr.	Ohio State	OL	Jr.	
Outland Trophy	Joe Tippmann	Wisconsin	OL	Jr.	

Award	Head Coach/Player	School	Position	Year	Ref
Lou Groza Award	Chad Ryland	Maryland	PK	Sr.	
Ray Guy Award	Tory Taylor	Iowa	P	Jr.	
Ray Guy Award	Brad Robbins	Michigan	P	(redshirt) Graduate	
Ray Guy Award	Bryce Baringer	Michigan State	P	(redshirt) Graduate	
Ray Guy Award	Brian Buschini	Nebraska	P	So.	
Ray Guy Award	Adam Korsak	Rutgers	P	Sr.	
Ray Guy Award	Andy Vujnovich	Wisconsin	P	Sr.	
Paul Hornung Award	D.J. Matthews Jr.	Indiana	WR	(redshirt) Graduate	
Paul Hornung Award	Tarheeb Still	Maryland	DB	Jr.	
Paul Hornung Award	Blake Corum	Michigan	RB	Jr.	
Paul Hornung Award	Jayden Reed	Michigan State	WR	Sr.	
Paul Hornung Award	Trey Palmer	Nebraska	WR	Jr.	
Paul Hornung Award	Jonathan Sutherland	Penn State	LB	(redshirt) Sr.	
Paul Hornung Award	Charlie Jones	Purdue	WR	(redshirt) Graduate	
Paul Hornung Award	Aron Cruickshank	Rutgers	WR	Sr.	
Wuerffel Trophy	Tailon Leitzsey	Illinois	DB	Sr.	
Wuerffel Trophy	Jack Tuttle	Indiana	QB	Sr.	
Wuerffel Trophy	Anthony Pecorella	Maryland	P	Sr.	
Wuerffel Trophy	Blake Corum	Michigan	RB	Jr.	
Wuerffel Trophy	Tre Mosley	Michigan State	WR	Sr.	
Wuerffel Trophy	Tanner Morgan	Minnesota	QB	Sr.	
Wuerffel Trophy	Ethan Piper	Nebraska	OL	Jr.	
Wuerffel Trophy	Kam Babb	Ohio State	WR	Jr.	
Wuerffel Trophy	Sean Clifford	Penn State	QB	Sr.	
Wuerffel Trophy	Aidan O'Connell	Purdue	QB	Sr.	
Wuerffel Trophy	Mayan Ahanotu	Rutgers	DL	Sr.	
Walter Camp Award	Blake Corum	Michigan	RB	Jr.	
Walter Camp Award	Payton Thorne	Michigan State	QB	Jr.	
Walter Camp Award	C. J. Stroud	Ohio State	QB	So.	
Walter Camp Award	Jaxon Smith-Njigba	Ohio State	WR	Jr.	
Walter Camp Award	TreVeyon Henderson	Ohio State	RB	So.	
Walter Camp Award	Sean Clifford	Penn State	QB	Sr.	
Walter Camp Award	Aidan O'Connell	Purdue	QB	Sr.	
Walter Camp Award	Braelon Allen	Wisconsin	RB	So.	
Bednarik Award	Mazi Smith	Michigan	DT	Sr.	
Bednarik Award	Xavier Henderson	Michigan State	S	Sr.	
Bednarik Award	Ronnie Hickman	Ohio State	DE	Jr.	
Bednarik Award	Zach Harrison	Ohio State	S	Sr.	
Bednarik Award	Ji'Ayir Brown	Penn State	S	Sr.	
Bednarik Award	Joey Porter Jr.	Penn State	CB	Jr.	
Bednarik Award	Nick Herbig	Wisconsin	LB	Jr.	
Rotary Lombardi Award	Jack Campbell	Iowa	LB	Sr.	
Rotary Lombardi Award	Sam LaPorta	Iowa	TE	Sr.	
Rotary Lombardi Award	John Michael Schmitz	Minnesota	C	Sr.	
Rotary Lombardi Award	Jacob Slade	Michigan State	DT	(redshirt) Sr.	
Rotary Lombardi Award	Peter Skoronski	Northwestern	OT	Jr.	
Rotary Lombardi Award	Dawand Jones	Ohio State	OT	Sr.	
Rotary Lombardi Award	Paris Johnson Jr.	Ohio State	OT	Jr.	
Rotary Lombardi Award	Zach Harrison	Ohio State	DE	Sr.	
Rotary Lombardi Award	P. J. Mustipher	Penn State	DT	Sr.	
Rotary Lombardi Award	Nick Herbig	Wisconsin	LB	Jr.	
Patrick Mannelly Award	Sean Wracher	Indiana	LS	Sr.	
Patrick Mannelly Award	Bradley Robinson	Ohio State	LS	(redshirt) Graduate	
Patrick Mannelly Award	Chris Stoll	Penn State	LS	(redshirt) Senior	
Earl Campbell Tyler Rose Award	Casey Washington	Illinois	WR	Jr.	
Earl Campbell Tyler Rose Award	Dylan Wright	Minnesota	WR	Jr.	
Earl Campbell Tyler Rose Award	Jaxon Smith-Njigba	Ohio State	WR	Jr.	
Earl Campbell Tyler Rose Award	Parker Washington	Penn State	WR	Jr.	
Earl Campbell Tyler Rose Award	King Doerue	Purdue	RB	Sr.	
Polynesian College Football Player Of The Year Award	Sio Nofoagatoto'a	Indiana	DL	Sr.	
Polynesian College Football Player Of The Year Award	Ami Finau	Maryland	DL	Sr.	
Polynesian College Football Player Of The Year Award	Mosiah Nasili-Kite	Maryland	DL	(redshirt) Sr.	
Polynesian College Football Player Of The Year Award	Taulia Tagovailoa	Maryland	QB	(redshirt) Jr.	
Polynesian College Football Player Of The Year Award	Chuck Filiaga	Minnesota	OL	(redshirt) Graduate	
Polynesian College Football Player Of The Year Award	Noa Pola-Gates	Nebraska	DB	So.	
Polynesian College Football Player Of The Year Award	JT Tuimoloau	Ohio State	DE	So.	
Polynesian College Football Player Of The Year Award	Sione Finau	Purdue	OL	Sr.	
Polynesian College Football Player Of The Year Award	Semisi Fakasiieiki	Purdue	LB	(redshirt) Graduate	
Manning Award	Taulia Tagovailoa	Maryland	QB	(redshirt) Jr.	
Manning Award	Payton Thorne	Michigan State	QB	Jr.	
Manning Award	C. J. Stroud	Ohio State	QB	So.	
Manning Award	Sean Clifford	Penn State	QB	Sr.	
Manning Award	Aidan O'Connell	Purdue	QB	Sr.	
Johnny Unitas Golden Arm Award	Tommy DeVito	Illinois	QB	Sr.	
Johnny Unitas Golden Arm Award	Connor Bazelak	Indiana	QB	(redshirt) Jr.	
Johnny Unitas Golden Arm Award	Spencer Petras	Iowa	QB	(redshirt) Sr.	
Johnny Unitas Golden Arm Award	Taulia Tagovailoa	Maryland	QB	(redshirt) Jr.	
Johnny Unitas Golden Arm Award	Cade McNamara	Michigan	QB	(redshirt) Graduate	
Johnny Unitas Golden Arm Award	Payton Thorne	Michigan State	QB	(redshirt) Jr.	
Johnny Unitas Golden Arm Award	Tanner Morgan	Minnesota	QB	Sr.	
Johnny Unitas Golden Arm Award	Casey Thompson	Nebraska	QB	Jr.	
Johnny Unitas Golden Arm Award	Ryan Hilinski	Northwestern	QB	Jr.	
Johnny Unitas Golden Arm Award	C. J. Stroud	Ohio State	QB	So.	
Johnny Unitas Golden Arm Award	Sean Clifford	Penn State	QB	Sr.	
Johnny Unitas Golden Arm Award	Aidan O'Connell	Purdue	QB	Sr.	
Johnny Unitas Golden Arm Award	Graham Mertz	Wisconsin	QB	(redshirt) Jr.	
Ted Hendricks Award					

== Rankings ==
		Pre	Wk 1	Wk 2	Wk 3	Wk 4	Wk 5	Wk 6	Wk 7	Wk 8	Wk 9	Wk 10	Wk 11	Wk 12	Wk 13	Wk 14	Final
Illinois	AP						RV	24	18	17	14	21	RV	RV	RV	RV	RV
Illinois	C						RV	RV	20	18	13	20	RV	RV	RV	RV	
Illinois	CFP	Not released									16	21					
Indiana	AP																
Indiana	C																
Indiana	CFP	Not released															
Iowa	AP	RV												RV			RV
Iowa	C	RV	RV											RV	RV		RV
Iowa	CFP	Not released															
Maryland	AP						RV	RV	RV	RV	RV						RV
Maryland	C					RV	RV	RV	RV	RV	RV	RV					RV
Maryland	CFP	Not released															
Michigan	AP	8	4	4	4	4	4	5	4	4	4	3	3	3	2 (5)	2 (1)	3
Michigan	C	6	5	5	4	4	4	4	3 (1)	4 (1)	4	3 (2)	3 (1)	3 (1)	2 (3)	2 (2)	3
Michigan	CFP	Not released									5	3	3	3	2	2	
Michigan State	AP	15	14	11	RV												
Michigan State	C	14	11	9	21	RV											
Michigan State	CFP	Not released															
Minnesota	AP	RV	RV	RV	RV	21	RV	RV	RV		RV		RV		RV	RV	RV
Minnesota	C	RV	RV	RV	RV	23	RV	RV				RV	RV		RV	RV	RV
Minnesota	CFP	Not released															
Nebraska	AP	RV															
Nebraska	C																
Nebraska	CFP	Not released															
Northwestern	AP																
Northwestern	C		RV														
Northwestern	CFP	Not released															
Ohio State	AP	2 (6)	3 (2)	3 (1)	3 (1)	3 (4)	3 (10)	2 (20)	2 (17)	2 (18)	2 (15)	2	2 (1)	2 (1)	5	4	4
Ohio State	C	2 (5)	3 (2)	3 (1)	3 (1)	3 (4)	3 (7)	3 (10)	2 (17)	2 (17)	2т (13)	2	2 (1)	2 (1)	5	3	4
Ohio State	CFP	Not released									2	2	2	2	5	4	
Penn State	AP	RV	RV	22	14	11	10	10	16	13	16	14	11	11	8	9	7
Penn State	C	RV	RV	23	15	12	10	10	16	13	16	15	12	10	7	7	7
Penn State	CFP	Not released									15	14	11	11	8	11	
Purdue	AP	RV	RV	RV			RV	RV	RV					RV	RV	RV	RV
Purdue	C	RV					RV	RV	RV					RV	RV	RV	RV
Purdue	CFP	Not released															
Rutgers	AP																
Rutgers	C																
Rutgers	CFP	Not released															
Wisconsin	AP	18	19	RV	RV												
Wisconsin	C	20	18	RV	RV												
Wisconsin	CFP	Not released															

Legend
	Improvement in ranking
	Drop in ranking
	Not ranked previous week
	No change in ranking from previous week
RV	Received votes but were not ranked in Top 25 of poll
т	Tied with team above or below also with this symbol

== Schedule ==
Index to colors and formatting
Big Ten member won
Big Ten member lost
Big Ten teams in **bold**

All times Eastern time.

† denotes Homecoming game

=== Regular season schedule ===
==== Week 0 ====
Date	Time	Visiting team	Home team	Site	TV	Result	Attendance	Ref.
August 27	12:30 p.m.	**Nebraska**	**Northwestern**	Aviva Stadium • Dublin, Ireland (Aer Lingus College Football Classic)	FOX	**NW** 31–28	42,699	
August 27	4:00 p.m.	Wyoming	**Illinois**	Memorial Stadium • Champaign, IL	BTN	**W** 38–6	37,832	
^{#}Rankings from AP Poll released prior to game. All times are in Eastern Time.

==== Week 1 ====
Date	Time	Visiting team	Home team	Site	TV	Result	Attendance	Ref.
September 1	8:00 p.m.	**Penn State**	**Purdue**	Ross-Ade Stadium • West Lafayette, IN	FOX	**PSU** 35–31	57,307	
September 1	9:00 p.m.	New Mexico State	**Minnesota**	Huntington Bank Stadium • Minneapolis, MN	BTN	**W** 38–0	44,012	
September 2	7:00 p.m.	Western Michigan	No. 15 **Michigan State**	Spartan Stadium • East Lansing, MI	ESPN2	**W** 35–13	73,928	
September 2	8:00 p.m.	**Illinois**	**Indiana**	Memorial Stadium • Bloomington, IN	FS1	**IU** 23–20	44,357	
September 3	12:00 p.m.	**Rutgers**	Boston College	Alumni Stadium • Chestnut Hill, MA	ACCN	**W** 22–21	35,048	
September 3	12:00 p.m.	South Dakota State	**Iowa**	Kinnick Stadium • Iowa City, IA	FS1	**W** 7–3	69,250	
September 3	12:00 p.m.	Buffalo	**Maryland**	Maryland Stadium • College Park, MD	BTN	**W** 31–10	30,223	
September 3	12:00 p.m.	Colorado State	No. 8 **Michigan**	Michigan Stadium • Ann Arbor, MI	ABC	**W** 51–7	109,575	
September 3	3:30 p.m.	North Dakota	**Nebraska**	Memorial Stadium • Lincoln, NE	BTN	**W** 38–17	86,590	
September 3	7:00 p.m.	Illinois State	No. 18 **Wisconsin**	Camp Randall Stadium • Madison, WI	FS1	**W** 38–0	73,727	
September 3	7:30 p.m.	No. 5 Notre Dame	No. 2 **Ohio State**	Ohio Stadium • Columbus OH	ABC	**W** 21–10	106,594	
^{#}Rankings from AP Poll released prior to game. All times are in Eastern Time.

Date	Bye Week
September 3	Northwestern

==== Week 2 ====
Date	Time	Visiting team	Home team	Site	TV	Result	Attendance	Ref.
September 10	12:00 p.m.	Western Illinois	**Minnesota**	Huntington Bank Stadium • Minneapolis, MN	BTN	**W** 62–10	43,859	
September 10	12:00 p.m.	Duke	**Northwestern**	Ryan Field • Evanston, IL	FS1	**L** 23–31	24,622	
September 10	12:00 p.m.	Arkansas State	No. 3 **Ohio State**	Ohio Stadium • Columbus, OH	BTN	**W** 45–12	100,067	
September 10	12:00 p.m.	Ohio	**Penn State**	Beaver Stadium • University Park, PA	ABC	**W** 46–10	107,306	
September 10	3:30 p.m.	Washington State	No. 19 **Wisconsin**	Camp Randall Stadium • Madison, WI	FOX	**L** 14–17	74,001	
September 10	3:30 p.m.	**Maryland**	Charlotte	Jerry Richardson Stadium • Charlotte, NC	Stadium	**W** 56–21	12,614	
September 10	4:00 p.m.	Virginia	**Illinois**	Memorial Stadium • Champaign, IL	ESPNU	**W** 24–3	33,669	
September 10	4:00 p.m.	Iowa State	**Iowa**	Kinnick Stadium • Iowa City, IA (Cy-Hawk Series)	BTN	**L** 7–10	69,250	
September 10	4:00 p.m.	Akron	No. 14 **Michigan State**	Spartan Stadium • East Lansing, MI	BTN	**W** 52–0	70,079	
September 10	4:00 p.m.	Indiana State	**Purdue**	Ross-Ade Stadium • West Lafayette, IN	BTN	**W** 56–0	53,676	
September 10	4:00 p.m.	Wagner	**Rutgers**	SHI Stadium • Piscataway, NJ	BTN	**W** 66–7	47,621	
September 10	7:30 p.m.	Georgia Southern	**Nebraska**	Memorial Stadium • Lincoln, NE	FS1	**L** 42–45	86,862	
September 10	8:00 p.m.	Idaho	**Indiana**	Memorial Stadium • Bloomington, IN	BTN	**W** 35–22	46,785	
September 10	8:00 p.m.	Hawaii	No. 4 **Michigan**	Michigan Stadium • Ann Arbor, MI	BTN	**W** 56–10	110,012	
^{#}Rankings from AP Poll released prior to game. All times are in Eastern Time.

==== Week 3 ====
Date	Time	Visiting team	Home team	Site	TV	Result	Attendance	Ref.
September 17	12:00 p.m.	Western Kentucky	**Indiana**	Memorial Stadium • Bloomington, IN	BTN	**W** 33–30 ^{OT}	48,952	
September 17	12:00 p.m.	Connecticut	No. 4 **Michigan**	Michigan Stadium • Ann Arbor, MI	ABC	**W** 59–0	109,639	
September 17	12:00 p.m.	No. 6 Oklahoma	**Nebraska**	Memorial Stadium • Lincoln, NE (NU-OU Rivalry)	FOX	**L** 14–49	87,161	
September 17	12:00 p.m.	Southern Illinois	**Northwestern**	Ryan Field • Evanston, IL	BTN	**L** 24–31	23,146	
September 17	12:00 p.m.	**Purdue**	Syracuse	Carrier Dome • Syracuse, NY	ESPN2	**L** 29–32	35,943	
September 17	2:00 p.m.	**Rutgers**	Temple	Lincoln Financial Field • Philadelphia, PA	ESPN+	**W** 16–14	33,297	
September 17	3:30 p.m.	Colorado	**Minnesota**	Huntington Bank Stadium • Minneapolis, MN	ESPN2	**W** 49–7	42,101	
September 17	3:30 p.m.	No. 22 **Penn State**	Auburn	Jordan-Hare Stadium • Auburn, AL	CBS	**W** 41–12	87,451	
September 17	3:30 p.m.	New Mexico State	**Wisconsin**	Camp Randall Stadium • Madison, WI	BTN	**W** 66–7	73,080	
September 17	7:00 p.m.	Toledo	No. 3 **Ohio State**	Ohio Stadium • Columbus, OH	FOX	**W** 77–21	105,398	
September 17	7:30 p.m.	Nevada	**Iowa**	Kinnick Stadium • Iowa City, IA	BTN	**W** 27–0	69,250	
September 17	7:30 p.m.	Southern Methodist	**Maryland**	Maryland Stadium • College Park, MD	FS1	**W** 34–27	31,194	
September 17	7:30 p.m.	No. 11 **Michigan State**	Washington	Husky Stadium • Seattle, WA	ABC	**L** 28–39	68,161	
^{#}Rankings from AP Poll released prior to game. All times are in Eastern Time.

Date	Bye Week
September 17	Illinois

==== Week 4 ====
Date	Time	Visiting team	Home team	Site	TV	Result	Attendance	Ref.
September 22	8:00 p.m.	Chattanooga	**Illinois**	Memorial Stadium • Champaign, Illinois	BTN	**W** 31–0	35,579	
September 24†	12:00 p.m.	**Maryland**	No. 4 **Michigan**	Michigan Stadium • Ann Arbor, MI	FOX	**MICH** 34–27	110,225	
September 24	12:00 p.m.	Central Michigan	No. 14 **Penn State**	Beaver Stadium • University Park, PA	BTN	**W** 33–14	106,624	
September 24	3:30 p.m.	**Minnesota**	**Michigan State**	Spartan Stadium • East Lansing, MI	BTN	**MIN**34–7	74,587	
September 24	3:30 p.m.	**Indiana**	Cincinnati	Nippert Stadium • Cincinnati, OH	ESPN2	**L** 24–45	38,464	
September 24	7:00 p.m.	**Iowa**	**Rutgers**	SHI Stadium • Piscataway, NJ	FS1	**IA** 27–10	53,117	
September 24†	7:30 p.m.	Florida Atlantic	**Purdue**	Ross-Ade Stadium • West Lafayette, IN	BTN	**W** 28–26	55,137	
September 24	7:30 p.m.	Miami (OH)	**Northwestern**	Ryan Field • Evanston, IL	BTN	**L** 14–17	23,773	
September 24	7:30 p.m.	**Wisconsin**	No. 3 **Ohio State**	Ohio Stadium • Columbus, OH	ABC	**OSU** 52–21	105,473	
^{†}Homecoming. ^{#}Rankings from AP Poll released prior to game. All times are in Eastern Time.

Date	Bye Week
September 24	Nebraska

==== Week 5 ====
Date	Time	Visiting team	Home team	Site	TV	Result	Attendance	Ref.
October 1	12:00 p.m.	**Illinois**	**Wisconsin**	Camp Randall Stadium • Madison, WI	BTN	**ILL** 34–10	73,502	
October 1†	12:00 p.m.	**Purdue**	No. 21 **Minnesota**	Huntington Bank Stadium • Minneapolis, MN	ESPN2	**PUR** 20–10	48,288	
October 1	12:00 p.m.	No. 4 **Michigan**	**Iowa**	Kinnick Stadium • Iowa City, IA	FOX	**MICH** 27–14	69,250	
October 1†	3:30 p.m.	**Rutgers**	No. 3 **Ohio State**	Ohio Stadium • Columbus, OH	BTN	**OSU** 49–10	104,245	
October 1	3:30 p.m.	**Michigan State**	**Maryland**	Maryland Stadium • College Park, MD	FS1	**MD** 27–13	30,559	
October 1	3:30 p.m.	**Northwestern**	No. 11 **Penn State**	Beaver Stadium • University Park, PA	ESPN	**PSU** 17–7	105,524	
October 1†	7:30 p.m.	**Indiana**	**Nebraska**	Memorial Stadium • Lincoln, NE	BTN	**NEB** 35–21	86,804	
^{†}Homecoming. ^{#}Rankings from AP Poll released prior to game. All times are in Eastern Time.

==== Week 6 ====
Date	Time	Visiting team	Home team	Site	TV	Result	Attendance	Ref.
October 7	7:00 p.m.	**Nebraska**	Rutgers	SHI Stadium • Piscataway, NJ	FS1	**NEB** 14–13	53,752	
October 8	12:00 pm	**Purdue**	Maryland	Maryland Stadium • College Park, MD	BTN	**PUR** 31–29	36,204	
October 8†	12:00 p.m.	No. 4 **Michigan**	Indiana	Memorial Stadium • Bloomington, IN	FOX	**MICH** 31–10	50,805	
October 8†	3:30 p.m.	**Wisconsin**	Northwestern	Ryan Field • Evanston, IL	BTN	**WIS** 42–7	32,121	
October 8	4:00 p.m.	No. 3 **Ohio State**	Michigan State	Spartan Stadium • East Lansing, MI	ABC	**OSU** 49–20	72,809	
October 8	7:30 p.m.	**Iowa**	Illinois	Memorial Stadium • Champaign, IL	BTN	**ILL** 9–6	44,910	
^{†}Homecoming. ^{#}Rankings from AP Poll released prior to game. All times are in Eastern Time.

Date	Bye Week	
October 8	Minnesota	No. 10 Penn State

==== Week 7 ====
Date	Time	Visiting team	Home team	Site	TV	Result	Attendance	Ref.
October 15†	12:00 p.m.	**Minnesota**	No. 24 **Illinois**	Memorial Stadium • Champaign, IL	BTN	**ILL** 26–14	45,683	
October 15	12:00 p.m.	No. 10 **Penn State**	No. 5 **Michigan**	Michigan Stadium • Ann Arbor, MI	FOX	**MICH** 41–17	110,812	
October 15	3:30 p.m.	**Maryland**	**Indiana**	Memorial Stadium • Bloomington, IN	ESPN2	**MD** 38–33	41,154	
October 15†	4:00 p.m.	**Wisconsin**	**Michigan State**	Spartan Stadium • East Lansing, MI	FOX	**MSU** 34–28 ^{2OT}	72,526	
October 15	7:30 p.m.	**Nebraska**	**Purdue**	Ross-Ade Stadium • West Lafayette, IN	BTN	**PUR** 43–37	61,320	
^{†}Homecoming. ^{#}Rankings from AP Poll released prior to game. All times are in Eastern Time.

Date	Bye Week			
October 15	Iowa	Northwestern	No. 2 Ohio State	Rutgers

==== Week 8 ====
Date	Time	Visiting team	Home team	Site	TV	Result	Attendance	Ref.
October 22†	12:00 p.m.	**Indiana**	**Rutgers**	SHI Stadium • Piscataway, NJ	BTN	**RUT** 24–17	48,255	
October 22	12:00 p.m.	**Iowa**	No. 2 **Ohio State**	Ohio Stadium • Columbus, OH	FOX	**OSU** 54–10	104,848	
October 22†	3:30 p.m.	**Northwestern**	**Maryland**	Maryland Stadium • College Park, MD	BTN	**MD** 31–24	31,418	
October 22†	3:30 p.m.	**Purdue**	**Wisconsin**	Camp Randall Stadium • Madison, WI	ESPN	**WIS** 35–24	75,018	
October 22†	7:30 p.m.	**Minnesota**	No. 16 **Penn State**	Beaver Stadium • University Park, PA (Governor's Victory Bell)	ABC	**PSU** 45–17	109,813	
^{†}Homecoming. ^{#}Rankings from AP Poll released prior to game. All times are in Eastern Time.

Date	Bye Week			
October 22	#18 Illinois	#4 Michigan	Michigan State	Nebraska

==== Week 9 ====
Date	Time	Visiting team	Home team	Site	TV	Result	Attendance	Ref.
October 29	12:00 p.m.	No. 2 **Ohio State**	No. 13 **Penn State**	Beaver Stadium • University Park, PA	FOX	**OSU** 44–31	108,433	
October 29	2:30 p.m.	**Rutgers**	**Minnesota**	Huntington Bank Stadium • Minneapolis, MN	BTN	**MIN** 31–0	49,368	
October 29†	3:30 p.m.	**Northwestern**	**Iowa**	Kinnick Stadium • Iowa City, IA	ESPN2	**IA** 33–13	69,250	
October 29	3:30 p.m.	No. 18 **Illinois**	**Nebraska**	Memorial Stadium • Lincoln, NE	ABC	**ILL** 26–9	86,691	
October 29	7:30 p.m.	**Michigan State**	No. 4 **Michigan**	Michigan Stadium • Ann Arbor, MI (Paul Bunyan Trophy)	ABC	**MICH** 29–7	111,083	
^{†}Homecoming. ^{#}Rankings from AP Poll released prior to game. All times are in Eastern Time.

Date	Bye Week			
October 29	Indiana	Maryland	Purdue	Wisconsin

==== Week 10 ====
Date	Time	Visiting team	Home team	Site	TV	Result	Attendance	Ref.
November 5	12:00 p.m.	**Maryland**	**Wisconsin**	Camp Randall Stadium • Madison, WI	BTN	**WIS** 23–10	74,057	
November 5	12:00 p.m.	No. 2 **Ohio State**	**Northwestern**	Ryan Field • Evanston, IL	ABC	**OSU** 21–7	42,774	
November 5	12:00 p.m.	**Minnesota**	**Nebraska**	Memorial Stadium • Lincoln, NE ($5 Bits of Broken Chair Trophy)	ESPN2	**MIN** 20–13	86,284	
November 5	12:00 p.m.	**Iowa**	**Purdue**	Ross-Ade Stadium • West Lafayette, IN	FS1	**IA** 24–3	61,320	
November 5	3:30 p.m.	No. 15 **Penn State**	**Indiana**	Memorial Stadium • Bloomington, IN	ABC	**PSU** 45–14	45,142	
November 5	3:30 p.m.	**Michigan State**	No. 16 **Illinois**	Memorial Stadium • Champaign, IL	BTN	**MSU** 23–15	56,092	
November 5	7:30 p.m.	No. 5 **Michigan**	**Rutgers**	SHI Stadium • Piscataway, NJ	BTN	**MICH** 52–17	51,117	
^{#}Rankings from College Football Playoff. All times are in Eastern Time.

==== Week 11 ====
Date	Time	Visiting team	Home team	Site	TV	Result	Attendance	Ref.
November 12	12:00 p.m.	Rutgers	**Michigan State**	Spartan Stadium • East Lansing, MI	BTN	**MSU** 27–21	63,627	
November 12	12:00 p.m.	Indiana	No. 2 **Ohio State**	Ohio Stadium • Columbus, OH	FOX	**OSU** 56–14	103,888	
November 12	12:00 p.m.	Purdue	No. 21 **Illinois**	Memorial Stadium • Champaign, IL (Purdue Cannon)	ESPN2	**PUR** 31–24	45,574	
November 12	3:30 p.m.	Maryland	No. 14 **Penn State**	Beaver Stadium • University Park, PA (MD-PSU Rivalry)	FOX	**PSU** 30–0	108,796	
November 12	3:30 p.m.	Northwestern	**Minnesota**	Huntington Bank Stadium • Minneapolis, MN	BTN	**MIN** 31–3	41,686	
November 12	3:30 p.m.	Nebraska	No. 3 **Michigan**	Michigan Stadium • Ann Arbor, MI	ABC	**MICH** 34–3	110,192	
November 12	3:30 p.m.	Wisconsin	**Iowa**	Kinnick Stadium • Iowa City, IA (Heartland Trophy)	FS1	**IA** 24–10	69,250	
^{#}Rankings from College Football Playoff. All times are in Eastern Time.

==== Week 12 ====
Date	Time	Visiting team	Home team	Site	TV	Result	Attendance	Ref.
November 19	12:00 p.m.	**Northwestern**	**Purdue**	Ross-Ade Stadium • West Lafayette, IN	FS1	**PUR** 17–9	54,016	
November 19	12:00 p.m.	**Illinois**	No. 3 **Michigan**	Michigan Stadium • Ann Arbor, MI	ABC	**MICH** 19–17	110,433	
November 19	12:00 p.m.	**Indiana**	**Michigan State**	Spartan Stadium • East Lansing, MI (Old Brass Spittoon)	BTN	**IU** 39–31 ^{2OT}	56,136	
November 19	12:00 p.m.	**Wisconsin**	**Nebraska**	Memorial Stadium • Lincoln, NE (Freedom Trophy)	ESPN	**WIS** 15–14	86,068	
November 19	3:30 p.m.	No. 2 **Ohio State**	**Maryland**	Maryland Stadium • College Park, MD	ABC	**OSU** 43–30	41,969	
November 19	3:30 p.m.	No. 11 **Penn State**	**Rutgers**	SHI Stadium • Piscataway, NJ	BTN	**PSU** 55–10	55,676	
November 19	4:00 p.m.	**Iowa**	**Minnesota**	Huntington Bank Stadium • Minneapolis, MN (Floyd of Rosedale)	FOX	**IA** 13–10	45,816	
^{#}Rankings from College Football Playoff. All times are in Eastern Time.

==== Week 13 ====
Date	Time	Visiting team	Home team	Site	TV	Result	Attendance	Ref.
November 25	4:00 p.m.	**Nebraska**	**Iowa**	Kinnick Stadium • Iowa City, IA (Heroes Game)	BTN	**NEB** 24–17	69,250	
November 26	12:00 p.m.	No. 3 **Michigan**	No. 2 **Ohio State**	Ohio Stadium • Columbus OH (The Game)	FOX	**MICH** 45–23	106,787	
November 26	12:00 p.m.	**Rutgers**	**Maryland**	Maryland Stadium • College Park, MD	BTN	**MD** 37–0	21,974	
November 26	3:30 p.m.	**Purdue**	**Indiana**	Memorial Stadium • Bloomington, IN (Old Oaken Bucket)	BTN	**PUR** 30–16	51,148	
November 26	3:30 p.m.	**Illinois**	**Northwestern**	Ryan Field • Evanston, IL (Land of Lincoln Trophy)	BTN	**ILL** 41–3	25,744	
November 26	3:30 p.m.	**Minnesota**	**Wisconsin**	Camp Randall Stadium • Madison, WI (Paul Bunyan's Axe)	ESPN	**MIN** 23–16	75,728	
November 26	4:00 p.m.	**Michigan State**	No. 11 **Penn State**	Beaver Stadium • University Park, PA (Land Grant Trophy)	FS1	**PSU** 35–16	105,154	
^{#}Rankings from College Football Playoff. All times are in Eastern Time.

==== Big Ten Championship Game ====
Date	Time	Visiting team	Home team	Site	TV	Result	Attendance	Ref.
December 3	8:00 p.m.	**Purdue**	No. 2 **Michigan**	Lucas Oil Stadium • Indianapolis, IN (Big Ten Championship Game)	FOX	**MICH** 43–22	67,107	
^{#}Rankings from College Football Playoff. All times are in Eastern Time.

== Postseason ==
=== Bowl games ===
For the 2020–2025 bowl cycle, The Big Ten will have annually eight appearances in the following bowls: Rose Bowl (unless they are selected for playoffs filled by a Pac-12 team if champion is in the playoffs), Citrus Bowl, Guaranteed Rate Bowl, Las Vegas Bowl, Music City Bowl, Pinstripe Bowl, Quick Lane Bowl, and Outback Bowl. The Big Ten teams will go to a New Year's Six bowl if a team finishes higher than the champions of Power Five conferences in the final College Football Playoff rankings. The Big Ten champion is also eligible for the College Football Playoff if it's among the top four teams in the final CFP ranking.

Legend
Big Ten win
Big Ten loss

Bowl game	Date	Site	Television	Time (EST)	Big Ten team	Opponent	Score	Attendance	Ref.
Guaranteed Rate Bowl	December 27, 2022	Chase Field • Phoenix, AZ	ESPN	10:15 p.m.	Wisconsin	Oklahoma State	24–17	23,187	
Pinstripe Bowl	December 29, 2021	Yankee Stadium • New York, NY	ESPN	2:00 p.m.	Minnesota	Syracuse	28–20	31,131	
Duke's Mayo Bowl	December 30, 2022	Bank of America Stadium • Charlotte, NC	ESPN	12:00 p.m.	Maryland	#25 North Carolina State	16–12	37,228	
Music City Bowl	December 31, 2022	Nissan Stadium • Nashville, TN	ABC	12:00 p.m.	Iowa	Kentucky	21–0	42,312	
ReliaQuest Bowl	January 2, 2023	Raymond James Stadium • Tampa, FL	ESPN2	12:00 p.m.	Illinois	#24 Mississippi State	10–19	35,797	
Citrus Bowl	January 2, 2022	Camping World Stadium • Orlando, FL	ABC	1:00 p.m.	Purdue	#16 LSU	7–63	42,791	
New Year's Six Bowls
Rose Bowl	January 2, 2023	Rose Bowl • Pasadena, CA	ESPN	5:00 p.m.	#9 Penn State	#7 Utah	35–21	94,873	
College Football Playoff
Fiesta Bowl (semifinal)	December 31, 2022	State Farm Stadium • Glendale, AZ	ESPN	4:00 p.m.	#2 Michigan	#3 TCU	45–51	71,723	
Peach Bowl (semifinal)	December 31, 2022	Mercedes-Benz Stadium • Atlanta, GA	ESPN	8:00 p.m.	#4 Ohio State	#1 Georgia	41–42	79,330	

Rankings are from AP Poll. All times Eastern Time Zone.

== Big Ten records vs other conferences ==
2022–2023 records against non-conference foes

Power Conferences 5	Record
ACC	2–2
Big 12	0–2
BYU/Notre Dame	1–0
Pac-12	1–2
SEC	1–0
Power 5 Total	5–6
Other FBS Conferences	Record
American	2–1
C–USA	3–0
Independents (Excluding Notre Dame)	3–0
MAC	6–1
Mountain West	4–0
Sun Belt	1–1
Other FBS Total	19–3
FCS Opponents	Record
Football Championship Subdivision	8–1
Total Non-Conference Record	32–10

Post Season

Power Conferences 5	Record
ACC	2–0
Big 12	1-1
BYU/Notre Dame	0–0
Pac-12	1-0
SEC	1–3
Power 5 Total	5–4
Other FBS Conferences	Record
American	0–0
C–USA	0–0
Independents (Excluding Notre Dame)	0–0
MAC	0–0
Mountain West	0–0
Sun Belt	0–0
Other FBS Total	0–0
Total Bowl Record	5–4

== Awards and honors ==
=== Player of the week honors ===
Week	Offensive			Defensive			Special Teams			Freshman		
Week	Player	Position	Team	Player	Position	Team	Player	Position	Team	Player	Position	Team
Week 0 (Aug. 29)	Chase Brown	RB	ILL	Cameron Mitchell	CB	NW	Luke Akers	P	NW	–	–	–
Week 0 (Aug. 29)	Ryan Hilinski	QB	NW	Cameron Mitchell	CB	NW	Luke Akers	P	NW	–	–	–
Week 1 (Sept. 5)	Anthony Grant	RB	NEB	Jacoby Windmon	DE/LB	MSU	Tory Taylor	P	IA	Roman Hemby	RB	MD
Week 1 (Sept. 5)	Sean Clifford	QB	PSU	Jacoby Windmon	DE/LB	MSU	Tory Taylor	P	IA	Roman Hemby	RB	MD
Week 2 (Sept. 12)	Taulia Tagovailoa	QB	MD	Jacoby Windmon	DE/LB	MSU	Lukas Van Ness	DT	IA	Nicholas Singleton	RB	PSU
Week 2 (Sept. 12)	Marvin Harrison Jr.	WR	OSU	Jacoby Windmon	DE/LB	MSU	Lukas Van Ness	DT	IA	Nicholas Singleton	RB	PSU
Week 3 (Sept. 19)	C. J. Stroud	QB	OSU	Ji'Ayir Brown	S	PSU	Charles Campbell	K	IU	Nicholas Singleton	RB	PSU
Week 4 (Sept. 26)	Blake Corum	RB	MICH	Kaevon Merriweather	DB	IA	Tory Taylor	P	IA	Kaytron Allen	RB	PSU
Week 4 (Sept. 26)	Tanner Morgan	QB	MIN	Tommy Eichenberg	LB	OSU	Tory Taylor	P	IA	Kaytron Allen	RB	PSU
Week 5 (Oct. 3)	Miyan Williams	RB	OSU	Cam Allen	S	PUR	Barney Armor	P	PSU	Malcolm Hartzog	CB	NEB
Week 6 (Oct. 10)	C. J. Stroud	QB	OSU	Kamo'l Latu	S	WIS	Fabrizio Pinton	K/P	ILL	Fabrizio Pinton	K/P	ILL
Week 6 (Oct. 10)	C. J. Stroud	QB	OSU	Kamo'l Latu	S	WIS	Fabrizio Pinton	K/P	ILL	Jaishawn Barham	LB	MD
Week 7 (Oct. 17)	Chase Brown	RB	ILL	Jacoby Windmon	DE/LB	MSU	Jake Moody	K	MICH	Devin Mockobee	RB	PUR
Week 7 (Oct. 17)	Aidan O'Connell	QB	PUR	Jacoby Windmon	DE/LB	MSU	Jake Moody	K	MICH	Devin Mockobee	RB	PUR
Week 8 (Oct. 24)	Sean Clifford	QB	PSU	John Torchio	S	WIS	Noah Ruggles	K	OSU	Roman Hemby	RB	MD
Week 9 (Oct. 31)	Blake Corum	RB	MICH	JT Tuimoloau	DE	OSU	Jake Moody	K	MICH	Drew Stevens	K	IA
Week 10 (Nov. 7)	Kaleb Johnson	RB	IA	Cal Haladay	LB	MSU	Matthew Trickett	K	MIN	Kaleb Johnson	RB	IA
Week 11 (Nov. 14)	C. J. Stroud	QB	OSU	Cal Haladay	LB	MSU	Jake Pinegar	K	PSU	Nicholas Singleton	RB	PSU
Week 12 (Nov. 21)	Mohamed Ibrahim	RB	MIN	Jack Campbell	LB	IA	Jake Moody	K	MICH	Dallan Hayden	RB	OSU
Week 12 (Nov. 21)	Mohamed Ibrahim	RB	MIN	Jack Campbell	LB	IA	Jake Moody	K	MICH	Kaytron Allen	RB	PSU
Week 13 (Nov. 28)	Donovan Edwards	RB	MICH	Sydney Brown	DB	ILL	Chad Ryland	K	MD	Athan Kaliakmanis	QB	MIN
Week 13 (Nov. 28)	Donovan Edwards	RB	MICH	Sydney Brown	DB	ILL	Chad Ryland	K	MD	Devin Mockobee	RB	PUR

=== Big Ten Individual Awards ===
The following individuals won the conference's annual player and coach awards:

Award	Player	School
Most Valuable Player	Blake Corum	Michigan
Graham–George Offensive Player of the Year	C. J. Stroud	Ohio State
Griese–Brees Quarterback of the Year	C. J. Stroud	Ohio State
Richter–Howard Receiver of the Year	Marvin Harrison Jr.	Ohio State
Ameche–Dayne Running Back of the Year	Blake Corum	Michigan
Kwalick–Clark Tight End of the Year	Sam LaPorta	Iowa
Rimington–Pace Offensive Lineman of the Year	Peter Skoronski	Northwestern
Nagurski–Woodson Defensive Player of the Year	Jack Campbell	Iowa
Smith–Brown Defensive Lineman of the Year	Mike Morris	Michigan
Butkus–Fitzgerald Linebacker of the Year	Jack Campbell	Iowa
Tatum–Woodson Defensive Back of the Year	Devon Witherspoon	Illinois
Thompson–Randle El Freshman of the Year	Nicholas Singleton	Penn State
Bakken–Andersen Kicker of the Year	Jake Moody	Michigan
Eddleman–Fields Punter of the Year	Bryce Baringer	Michigan State
Rodgers–Dwight Return Specialist of the Year	Jaylin Lucas	Indiana
Hayes–Schembechler Coach of the Year	Jim Harbaugh	Michigan
Dave McClain Coach of the Year	Jim Harbaugh	Michigan
Dungy–Thompson Humanitarian Award	Nate Sudfeld	Indiana
Ford–Kinnick Leadership Award	Ron Guenther	Illinois

=== All-Conference Teams ===
2022 Big Ten All-Conference Teams and Awards

Position	Player	Team
First Team Offense (Coaches)
QB	C. J. Stroud	Ohio State
RB	Blake Corum	Michigan
RB	Mohamed Ibrahim	Minnesota
WR	Marvin Harrison Jr.	Ohio State
WR	Charlie Jones	Purdue
TE	Sam LaPorta	Iowa
C	Olusegun Oluwatimi	Michigan
C	John Michael Schmitz	Minnesota
OG	Trevor Keegan	Michigan
OG	Zak Zinter	Michigan
OT	Peter Skoronski	Northwestern
OT	Paris Johnson Jr.	Ohio State
First Team Defense (Coaches)
DL	Johnny Newton	Illinois
DL	Mike Morris	Michigan
DL	Mazi Smith	Michigan
DL	JT Tuimoloau	Ohio State
LB	Jack Campbell	Iowa
LB	Nick Herbig	Wisconsin
LB	Tommy Eichenberg	Ohio State
DB	Sydney Brown	Illinois
DB	Devon Witherspoon	Illinois
DB	Riley Moss	Iowa
DB	Joey Porter Jr.	Penn State
First Team Special Teams (Coaches)
PK	Jake Moody	Michigan
P	Bryce Baringer	Michigan State
RS	Jaylin Lucas	Indiana

Position	Player	Team
Second Team Offense (Coaches)
QB	Taulia Tagovailoa	Maryland
QB	Aidan O'Connell	Purdue
RB	Chase Brown	Illinois
RB	Braelon Allen	Wisconsin
WR	Jayden Reed	Michigan State
WR	Emeka Egbuka	Ohio State
TE	Payne Durham	Purdue
C	Alex Pihlstrom	Illinois
OG	Donovan Jackson	Ohio State
OG	Matthew Jones	Ohio State
OT	Ryan Hayes	Michigan
OT	Olu Fashanu	Penn State
Second Team Defense (Coaches)
DL	Lukas Van Ness	Iowa
DL	Garrett Nelson	Nebraska
DL	Zach Harrison	Ohio State
DL	P. J. Mustipher	Penn State
LB	Seth Benson	Iowa
LB	Junior Colson	Michigan
LB	Cal Haladay	Michigan State
DB	Cooper DeJean	Iowa
DB	D. J. Turner	Michigan
DB	Tyler Nubin	Minnesota
DB	John Torchio	Wisconsin
Second Team Special Teams (Coaches)
PK	Chad Ryland	Maryland
P	Adam Korsak	Rutgers
RS	A. J. Henning	Michigan

Position	Player	Team
Third Team Offense (Coaches)
QB	J. J. McCarthy	Michigan
RB	Miyan Williams	Ohio State
RB	Nicholas Singleton	Penn State
WR	Ronnie Bell	Michigan
WR	Trey Palmer	Nebraska
TE	Luke Schoonmaker	Michigan
TE	Brenton Strange	Penn State
C	Juice Scruggs	Penn State
OG	Chuck Filiaga	Minnesota
OG	Axel Ruschmeyer	Minnesota
OT	Dawand Jones	Ohio State
OT	Alex Palczewski	Illinois
Third Team Defense (Coaches)
DL	Keith Randolph	Illinois
DL	Adisa Isaac	Penn State
DL	Aaron Lewis	Rutgers
DL	Keeanu Benton	Wisconsin
LB	Mike Barrett	Michigan
LB	Mariano Sori-Marin	Minnesota
LB	Abdul Carter	Penn State
DB	Quan Martin	Illinois
DB	Ronnie Hickman	Ohio State
DB	Ji'Ayir Brown	Penn State
DB	Kalen King	Penn State
Third Team Special Teams (Coaches)
PK	Drew Stevens	Iowa
P	Tory Taylor	Iowa
RS	Aron Cruickshank	Rutgers

Coaches Honorable Mention: ILLINOIS: Isaiah Adams, Tarique Barnes, Zy Crisler, Isaac Darkangelo, Caleb Griffin, Julian Pearl, Isaiah Williams; INDIANA: Charles Campbell, James Evans, Cam Jones, Tiawan Mullen; IOWA: Joe Evans, Kaleb Johnson, Logan Lee, Kaevon Merriweather, Mason Richman, Noah Shannon; MARYLAND: Jakorian Bennett, Jaelyn Duncan, Ami Finau, Delmar Glaze, Roman Hemby, Rakim Jarrett, Colton Spangler; MICHIGAN: Karsen Barnhart, Gemon Green, Kris Jenkins, Mike Sainristil; MICHIGAN STATE: Simeon Barrow, Keon Coleman, J.D. Duplain, Jayden Reed, Nick Samac, Jacob Slade; MINNESOTA: Trill Carter, Aireontae Ersery, Cody Lindenberg, Quentin Redding, Brevyn Spann-Ford, Danny Striggow, Matthew Trickett; NEBRASKA: Anthony Grant, Quinton Newsome, Luke Reimer; NORTHWESTERN: Adetomiwa Adebawore, Bryce Gallagher, Evan Hull, Cameron Mitchell; OHIO STATE: Denzel Burke, Steele Chambers, Mike Hall Jr., Tanner McCalister, Jesse Mirco, Lathan Ransom, Noah Ruggles, Jack Sawyer, Cade Stover, Luke Wypler; PENN STATE: Barney Amor, Sean Clifford, Curtis Jacobs, Hunter Nourzad, Chop Robinson, Nicholas Singleton, Nick Tarburton, Parker Washington, Sal Wormley; PURDUE: Branson Deen, Jalen Graham, Kydran Jenkins, Charlie Jones, Devin Mockobee, Jack Sullivan, Cory Trice; RUTGERS: Christian Izien, Max Melton, Avery Young; WISCONSIN: Tanor Bortolini, Isaac Guerendo, Jack Nelson, Maema Njongmeta, Joe Tippmann.

Position	Player	Team
First Team Offense (Media)
QB	C. J. Stroud	Ohio State
RB	Blake Corum	Michigan
RB	Mohamed Ibrahim	Minnesota
WR	Marvin Harrison Jr.	Ohio State
WR	Charlie Jones	Purdue
TE	Sam LaPorta	Iowa
C	John Michael Schmitz	Minnesota
OG	Donovan Jackson	Ohio State
OG	Zak Zinter	Michigan
OT	Peter Skoronski	Northwestern
OT	Paris Johnson Jr.	Ohio State
First Team Defense (Media)
DL	Johnny Newton	Illinois
DL	Mike Morris	Michigan
DL	Mazi Smith	Michigan
DL	Zach Harrison	Ohio State
LB	Jack Campbell	Iowa
LB	Nick Herbig	Wisconsin
LB	Tommy Eichenberg	Ohio State
DB	Devon Witherspoon	Illinois
DB	Cooper DeJean	Iowa
DB	Joey Porter Jr.	Penn State
DB	John Torchio	Wisconsin
First Team Special Teams (Media)
PK	Jake Moody	Michigan
P	Tory Taylor	Iowa
RS	Jaylin Lucas	Indiana

Position	Player	Team
Second Team Offense (Media)
QB	J. J. McCarthy	Michigan
RB	Chase Brown	Illinois
RB	Braelon Allen	Wisconsin
WR	Trey Palmer	Nebraska
WR	Emeka Egbuka	Ohio State
TE	Payne Durham	Purdue
C	Olusegun Oluwatimi	Michigan
OG	Trevor Keegan	Michigan
OG	Matt Jones	Ohio State
OT	Alex Palczewski	Illinois
OT	Dawand Jones	Ohio State
Second Team Defense (Media)
DL	Joe Evans	Iowa
DL	Lukas Van Ness	Iowa
DL	Garrett Nelson	Nebraska
DL	JT Tuimoloau	Ohio State
LB	Seth Benson	Iowa
LB	Cal Haladay	Michigan State
LB	Abdul Carter	Penn State
DB	Sydney Brown	Illinois
DB	Quan Martin	Illinois
DB	Riley Moss	Iowa
DB	Tyler Nubin	Minnesota
Second Team Special Teams (Media)
PK	Drew Stevens	Iowa
P	Bryce Baringer	Michigan State
RS	A. J. Henning	Michigan

Position	Player	Team
Third Team Offense (Media)
QB	Aidan O'Connell	Purdue
RB	Miyan Williams	Ohio State
RB	Nicholas Singleton	Penn State
WR	Ronnie Bell	Michigan
WR	Keon Coleman	Michigan State
TE	Cade Stover	Ohio State
C	Luke Wypler	Ohio State
OG	Isaiah Adams	Illinois
OG	Axel Ruschmeyer	Minnesota
OT	Ryan Hayes	Michigan
OT	Olu Fashanu	Penn State
Third Team Defense (Media)
DL	Keith Randolph	Illinois
DL	Adetomiwa Adebawore	Northwestern
DL	Mike Hall Jr.	Ohio State
DL	P. J. Mustipher	Penn State
LB	Junior Colson	Michigan
LB	Bryce Gallagher	Northwestern
LB	Maema Njongmeta	Wisconsin
DB	D. J. Turner	Michigan
DB	Ronnie Hickman	Ohio State
DB	Ji'Ayir Brown	Penn State
DB	Kalen King	Penn State
Third Team Special Teams (Media)
PK	Noah Ruggles	Ohio State
P	Adam Korsak	Rutgers
RS	Jayden Reed	Michigan State

Media Honorable Mention: ILLINOIS: Tarique Barnes, Seth Coleman, Isaac Darkangelo, Tommy DeVito, Caleb Griffin, Gabe Jacas, Julian Pearl, Alex Pihlstrom, Kendall Smith, Isaiah Williams; INDIANA: Charles Campbell, Aaron Casey, James Evans, Cam Jones, Dasan McCullough, Tiawan Mullen; IOWA: Kaleb Johnson, Luke Lachey, Logan Lee, Kaevon Merriweather, Noah Shannon; MARYLAND: Deonte Banks, Jaishawn Barham, Jakorian Bennett, Beau Brade, Corey Dyches, Jaelyn Duncan, Ami Finau, Roman Hemby, Rakim Jarrett, Chad Ryland, Colton Spangler, Taulia Tagovailoa; MICHIGAN: Karsen Barnhart, Gemon Green, Jaylen Harrell, Kris Jenkins, Makari Paige, Luke Schoonmaker; MICHIGAN STATE: Simeon Barrow, J.D. Duplain, Xavier Henderson, Jayden Reed, Nick Samac, Jacob Slade; MINNESOTA: Kyler Baugh, Quinn Carroll, Aireontae Ersery, Chuck Filiaga, Jordan Howden, Cody Lindenberg, Thomas Rush, Terell Smith, Mariano Sori-Marin, Brevyn Spann-Ford, Matthew Trickett; NEBRASKA: Anthony Grant, Luke Reimer; NORTHWESTERN: Evan Hull, Cameron Mitchell; OHIO STATE: Denzel Burke, Steele Chambers, TreVeyon Henderson, Tanner McCalister, Jesse Mirco, Lathan Ransom, Tyleik Williams; PENN STATE: Kaytron Allen, Sean Clifford, Johnny Dixon, Bryce Effner, Adisa Isaac, Curtis Jacobs, Hunter Nourzad, Jake Pinegar, Chop Robinson, Juice Scruggs, Brenton Strange, Parker Washington, Sal Wormley; PURDUE: Cam Allen, Jalen Graham, Gus Hartwig, Spencer Holstege, Lawrence Johnson, Charlie Jones, Marcus Mbow, Devin Mockobee, Jack Sullivan, Cory Trice; RUTGERS: Christian Braswell, Aron Cruickshank, Christian Izien, Deion Jennings, Aaron Lewis, Max Melton, Avery Young; WISCONSIN: Keeanu Benton, Tanor Bortolini, Chimere Dike, C. J. Goetz, Isaac Guerendo, Jack Nelson, Joe Tippmann, Jordan Turner.

== Home attendance ==
Team	Stadium	Capacity	Game 1	Game 2	Game 3	Game 4	Game 5	Game 6	Game 7	Game 8	Total	Average	% of Capacity
Illinois	Memorial Stadium	60,670	37,832	33,669	35,579	44,910	45,683	56,092†	45,574		299,339	42,763	70.5%
Indiana	Memorial Stadium	52,626	44,357	46,785	48,952	50,805	41,154	45,142	51,148†		328,343	46,906	89.1%
Iowa	Kinnick Stadium	69,250	69,250†	69,250	69,250	69,250	69,250	69,250	69,250		484,750	69,250	100.0%
Maryland	SECU Stadium	51,802	30,223	31,194	30,559	36,204	31,418	41,969†	21,974		223,541	31,934	61.6%
Michigan	Michigan Stadium	107,601	**109,575**	**110,012**	**109,639**	**110,225**	**110,812**	**111,083**†	**110,192**	**110,433**	881,971	**110,246**	102.5%
Michigan State	Spartan Stadium	75,005	73,928	70,079	74,587†	72,809	72,526	63,627	56,136		483,692	69,099	92.1%
Minnesota	Huntington Bank Stadium	50,805	44,012	43,859	42,101	48,288	49,368†	41,686	45,816		315,130	45,019	88.6%
Nebraska	Memorial Stadium	85,458	**86,590**	**86,862**	**87,161**†	**86,804**	**86,691**	**86,284**	**86,068**		606,460	**86,637**	101.4%
Northwestern	Ryan Field	47,130	24,622	23,146	23,773	32,121	42,774†	25,744			172,180	28,697	60.9%
Ohio State	Ohio Stadium	102,780	**106,594**	100,067	**105,398**	**105,473**	**104,245**	**104,848**	**103,888**	**106,787**†	837,300	**104,663**	101.8%
Penn State	Beaver Stadium	106,572	**107,306**	**106,624**	105,524	**109,813**†	**108,433**	**108,796**	105,154		751,650	**107,379**	100.8%
Purdue	Ross–Ade Stadium	57,236	**57,307**	53,676	55,137	**61,320**†	**61,320**	54,016			342,776	57,129	99.8%
Rutgers	SHI Stadium	52,454	47,621	**53,117**	**53,752**	48,255	51,117	**55,676**†			309,538	51,590	98.4%
Wisconsin	Camp Randall Stadium	75,822	73,727	74,001	73,080	73,502	75,018	74,057	75,728†		519,113	74,159	97.8%

Bold – Exceed capacity
†Season High

== 2023 NFL draft ==
The Big Ten had 55 players taken in the 2023 NFL Draft, the second-most by a conference trailing only the SEC who had 62 selections.

Team	Round 1	Round 2	Round 3	Round 4	Round 5	Round 6	Round 7	Total
Illinois	1	1	1	–	1	–	–	4
Indiana	–	–	–	–	–	–	–	–
Iowa	2	1	1	–	–	–	–	4
Maryland	1	–	–	2	–	1	1	5
Michigan	1	2	1	–	2	1	2	9
Michigan State	–	1	–	–	–	2	–	3
Minnesota	–	1	–	–	2	–	–	3
Nebraska	–	–	–	–	–	2	–	2
Northwestern	1	–	–	1	2	–	–	4
Ohio State	3	–	1	1	–	1	–	6
Penn State	–	3	1	–	1	1	–	6
Purdue	–	–	–	2	1	–	2	5
Rutgers	–	–	–	–	–	1	–	1
Wisconsin	–	2	–	1	–	–	–	3

The following list includes all Big Ten players who were drafted in the 2023 NFL draft

*	compensatory selection
×	2020 Resolution JC-2A selection

Rnd.	Pick	Team	Player	Pos.	College	Notes
1	2	Houston Texans	C. J. Stroud	QB	Ohio State	
1	5	Seattle Seahawks	Devon Witherspoon	CB	Illinois	from Denver (Note: No. 5: Denver → Seattle (PD). Denver traded Drew Lock, Shelby Harris, Noah Fant, first and second-round selections, and 2022 first, second, and fifth-round selections to Seattle in exchange for Russell Wilson and a 2022 fourth-round selection.)
1	6	Arizona Cardinals	Paris Johnson	T	Ohio State	from LA Rams via Detroit (Note: No. 6: LA Rams → Detroit (PD). The Rams traded their first-round selection as well as their 2021 third-round and 2022 first-round selections, and quarterback Jared Goff to Detroit in exchange for quarterback Matthew Stafford.)
1	11	Tennessee Titans	Peter Skoronski	T	Northwestern	
1	13	Green Bay Packers	Lukas Van Ness	DE	Iowa	from New York Jets (Note: No. 13: NY Jets → Green Bay (PD). The Jets traded 2023 first, second, sixth round and conditional 2024 second round to Green Bay for quarterback Aaron Rodgers and 2023 first and fifth round selections.)
1	18	Detroit Lions	Jack Campbell	LB	Iowa	
1	20	Seattle Seahawks	Jaxon Smith-Njigba	WR	Ohio State	
1	24	New York Giants	Deonte Banks	CB	Maryland	from Jacksonville
1	26	Dallas Cowboys	Mazi Smith	DT	Michigan	
2	32	Pittsburgh Steelers	Joey Porter Jr.	CB	Penn State	from Chicago (Note: No. 32: Chicago → Pittsburgh (PD). Chicago traded its second-round selection to Pittsburgh in exchange for wide receiver Chase Claypool.)
2	34	Detroit Lions	Sam LaPorta	TE	Iowa	from Arizona
2	43	New York Jets	Joe Tippmann	C	Wisconsin	
2	47	Washington Commanders	Quan Martin	S	Illinois	
2	49	Pittsburgh Steelers	Keeanu Benton	NT	Wisconsin	
2	50	Green Bay Packers	Jayden Reed	WR	Michigan State	from Tampa Bay
2	57	New York Giants	John Michael Schmitz	C	Minnesota	
2	58	Dallas Cowboys	Luke Schoonmaker	TE	Michigan	
2	60	Cincinnati Bengals	D. J. Turner	CB	Michigan	
2	61	Jacksonville Jaguars	Brenton Strange	TE	Penn State	from San Francisco via Carolina and Chicago (Note: No. 61: San Francisco → Carolina → Chicago (PD). Multiple trades: San Francisco → Carolina (PD). San Francisco traded second, third, and fourth-round selections and a 2024 fifth-round selection to Carolina in exchange for running back Christian McCaffrey. Carolina → Chicago (PD).)
2	62	Houston Texans	Juice Scruggs	C	Penn State	from Philadelphia
3	66	Philadelphia Eagles	Sydney Brown	S	Illinois	from Arizona (Note: No. 66: Arizona → Philadelphia (PD). Arizona traded a third-round selection to Philadelphia in exchange for a third-round selections and a 2024 fifth-round selection.)
3	75	Atlanta Falcons	Zach Harrison	DE	Ohio State	
3	83	Denver Broncos	Riley Moss	CB	Iowa	from Seattle
3	87	San Francisco 49ers	Ji'Ayir Brown	S	Penn State	from Minnesota
3×	99	San Francisco 49ers	Jake Moody	K	Michigan	2020 Resolution JC-2A selection (Note: San Francisco received a third-round selection when Washington hired San Francisco's vice president of player personnel Martin Mayhew as general manager.)
4	104	Las Vegas Raiders	Jakorian Bennett	CB	Maryland	from Houston
4	110	Indianapolis Colts	Adetomiwa Adebawore	DE	Northwestern	from Tennessee via Atlanta (Note: No. 110: Tennessee → Atlanta (PD). Tennessee traded a fourth-round selection as well as a 2022 second-round selection to Atlanta in exchange for wide receiver Julio Jones and a sixth-round selection.)
4	111	Cleveland Browns	Dawand Jones	T	Ohio State	
4	112	New England Patriots	Chad Ryland	K	Maryland	from NY Jets
4	131	Cincinnati Bengals	Charlie Jones	WR	Purdue	
4	132	Pittsburgh Steelers	Nick Herbig	OLB	Wisconsin	from San Francisco via Carolina (Note: No. 132: San Francisco → Carolina (PD). See No. 61: San Francisco → Carolina.)
4*	135	Las Vegas Raiders	Aidan O'Connell	QB	Purdue	from New England (Note: No. 135: New England → Las Vegas (D). New England traded a fourth-round selection to Las Vegas in exchange for a fifth-round selection (No. 144) and a sixth-round selection (No. 214).)
5	142	Cleveland Browns	Cameron Mitchell	CB	Northwestern	
5	146	New Orleans Saints	Jordan Howden	S	Minnesota	
5	149	Green Bay Packers	Sean Clifford	QB	Penn State	
5	151	Seattle Seahawks	Mike Morris	DE	Michigan	from Pittsburgh (Note: No. 151: Pittsburgh → Seattle (PD). Pittsburgh traded a fifth-round selection to Seattle in exchange for cornerback Ahkello Witherspoon.)
5	154	Seattle Seahawks	Olu Oluwatimi	C	Michigan	
5	163	Cincinnati Bengals	Chase Brown	RB	Illinois	
5	165	Chicago Bears	Terell Smith	CB	Minnesota	from Philadelphia (Note: No. 165: Philadelphia → New Orleans (PD). Philadelphia traded a fifth-round selection and a 2024 sixth-round pick to New Orleans in exchange for safety C. J. Gardner-Johnson and a 2025 seventh-round selection.)
5*	171	Tampa Bay Buccaneers	Payne Durham	TE	Purdue	from LA Rams
5*	176	Indianapolis Colts	Evan Hull	RB	Northwestern	from Dallas (Note: No. 176: Dallas → Indianapolis (PD). Dallas traded a fifth-round compensatory selection to Indianapolis in exchange for cornerback Stephon Gilmore.)
6	185	Jacksonville Jaguars	Parker Washington	WR	Penn State	from NY Jets (Note: No. 185: NY Jets → Jacksonville (PD). The Jets traded a sixth-round selection to Jacksonville in exchange for running back James Robinson.)
6	186	Tennessee Titans	Jaelyn Duncan	T	Maryland	from Atlanta (Note: No. 186: Atlanta → Tennessee (PD). See No. 110: Tennessee → Atlanta.)
6	189	Los Angeles Rams	Ochaun Mathis	DE	Nebraska	from Tennessee (Note: No. 189: Tennessee → LA Rams (PD). Tennessee traded a sixth-round selection to the Rams in exchange for wide receiver Robert Woods.)
6	190	Cleveland Browns	Luke Wypler	C	Ohio State	
6	191	Tampa Bay Buccaneers	Trey Palmer	WR	Nebraska	from Green Bay via LA Rams, Houston, and Philadelphia (Note: No. 191: Green Bay → LA Rams → Houston → Philadelphia → Tampa Bay. Multiple trades: Green Bay → LA Rams (PD). Green Bay traded a sixth-round selection to the Rams in exchange for punter Corey Bojorquez and a seventh-round selection. Los Angeles Rams → Houston (D). Houston → Philadelphia (D). Philadelphia traded two seventh-round selections (Nos. 230 and 248) to Houston in exchange for a sixth-round selection (No. 191). Philadelphia → Tampa Bay (D). Philadelphia traded pick 191 to Tampa Bay in exchange for a 2024 fifth-round selection.)
6	192	New England Patriots	Bryce Baringer	P	Michigan State	
6	202	Jacksonville Jaguars	Christian Braswell	CB	Rutgers	
6*	214	New England Patriots	Ameer Speed	CB	Michigan State	
6*	217	Cincinnati Bengals	Brad Robbins	P	Michigan	from Kansas City
7	238	Miami Dolphins	Ryan Hayes	T	Michigan	
7	241	Pittsburgh Steelers	Cory Trice	CB	Purdue	from Minnesota via Denver (Note: No. 241: Minnesota → Denver → Pittsburgh. Multiple trades: Minnesota → Denver (PD). Minnesota traded Stephen Weatherly and a seventh-round selection to Denver in exchange for a 2022 seventh-round selection. Denver → Pittsburgh (PD).)
7*	251	Pittsburgh Steelers	Spencer Anderson	G	Maryland	from LA Rams (Note: No. 251: LA Rams → Pittsburgh (PD).)
7*	253	San Francisco 49ers	Ronnie Bell	WR	Michigan	
7*	255	San Francisco 49ers	Jalen Graham	OLB	Purdue	

Trades In the explanations below, (PD) indicates trades completed prior to the start of the draft (i.e. Pre-Draft), while (D) denotes trades that took place during the 2022 draft.

Round one

== Head coaches ==
Through 2022 season

Team	Head coach	Years at school	Overall record	Record at school	B1G record
Illinois	Bret Bielema (Note: Bret Bielema coached in the Big Ten from 2006 through 2012 at Wisconsin, going 37–19 in Big Ten play and winning three Big Ten championships.)	2	110–70 (.611)	13–12 (.520)	46–28 (.622)
Indiana	Tom Allen (Note: Tom Allen was hired to replace Kevin Wilson in December 2016 at Indiana and coached the Hoosiers in their 2016 bowl game, going 0–1.)	6	30–40 (.429)	30–40 (.429)	17–35 (.327)
Iowa	Kirk Ferentz	24	198–136 (.593)	186–115 (.618)	115–83 (.581)
Maryland	Mike Locksley (Note: Mike Locksley served as interim head coach at Maryland in 2015 and coached for six games, going 1–5.)	4	23–54 (.299)	21–28 (.429)	11–27 (.289)
Michigan	Jim Harbaugh	8	132–52 (.717)	74–25 (.747)	51–17 (.750)
Michigan State	Mel Tucker	3	23–21 (.523)	18–14 (.563)	12–13 (.480)
Minnesota	P. J. Fleck	6	74–49 (.602)	44–27 (.620)	26–26 (.500)
Nebraska	Scott Frost	5	35–38 (.479)	16–31 (.340)	10–26 (.278)
Nebraska	Mickey Joseph (Note: Scott Frost was fired three games into the 2022 season. Receivers coach Mickey Joseph was named the interim for the remainder of the season.)	1	16–13 (.552)	3–6 (.333)	3–5 (.375)
Northwestern	Pat Fitzgerald	17	110–101 (.521)	110–101 (.521)	65–76 (.461)
Ohio State	Ryan Day (Note: Ryan Day served as interim head coach at Ohio State for the first three games of the 2018 season while Urban Meyer served a three-game suspension and went 3–0.)	4	45–6 (.882)	45–6 (.882)	31–2 (.939)
Penn State	James Franklin	9	102–51 (.667)	78–36 (.684)	49–30 (.620)
Purdue	Jeff Brohm	6	66–44 (.600)	36–34 (.514)	26–25 (.510)
Purdue	Brian Brohm	1	0–1 (.000)	0–1 (.000)	0–0 (–)
Rutgers	Greg Schiano (Note: Greg Schiano served as head coach at Rutgers from 2001 through 2011 then left for the NFL. Following the conclusion of the 2019 season, Schiano returned to Rutgers for his second stint as head coach. The Scarlet Knights competed in the Big East Conference in his previous stay at the school.)	14	80–89 (.473)	80–89 (.473)	6–21 (.222)
Wisconsin	Paul Chryst	8	86–45 (.656)	67–26 (.720)	43–18 (.705)
Wisconsin	Jim Leonhard (Note: Paul Chryst was fired five games into his eighth season at Wisconsin. Defensive coordinator Jim Leonhard was named the interim for the last 7 games of the regular season.)	1	4–3 (.571)	4–3 (.571)	4–3 (.571)
Wisconsin	Luke Fickell (Note: Luke Fickell is credited with the Guaranteed Rate bowl win.)	1	64–25 (.719)	1–0 (1.000)	3–5 (.375)
