= 2022 All-America college football team =

American football team

The 2022 All-America college football team includes those players of American college football who have been honored by various selector organizations as the best players at their respective positions. The selector organizations award the "All-America" honor annually following the conclusion of the fall college football season. The original All-America team was the 1889 All-America college football team selected by Caspar Whitney. The National Collegiate Athletic Bureau, which is the National Collegiate Athletic Association's (NCAA) service bureau, compiled, in the 1950, the first list of All-Americans including first-team selections on teams created for a national audience that received national circulation with the intent of recognizing selections made from viewpoints that were nationwide. Since 1957, College Sports Information Directors of America (CoSIDA) has bestowed Academic All-American recognition on male and female athletes in Divisions I, II, and III of the NCAA as well as National Association of Intercollegiate Athletics and NJCAA athletes, including all NCAA championship sports.

The 2022 College Football All-America Team is composed of the following College Football All-American first teams chosen by the following selector organizations: Associated Press (AP), Football Writers Association of America (FWAA), American Football Coaches Association (AFCA), Walter Camp Foundation (WCFF), Sporting News (TSN, from its historic name of The Sporting News), Sports Illustrated (SI), The Athletic (Athletic), USA Today (USAT), ESPN, CBS Sports (CBS), College Football News (CFN), Scout.com, Athlon Sports, Phil Steele, and Fox Sports (FOX).

Currently, the NCAA compiles consensus all-America teams in the sports of Division I FBS football and Division I men's basketball using a point system computed from All-America teams named by coaches associations or media sources. Players are chosen against other players playing at their position only. To be selected a consensus All-American, players must be chosen to the first team on at least half of the five official selectors as recognized by the NCAA. Second- and third-team honors are used to break ties. Players named first-team by all five selectors are deemed unanimous All-Americans. Currently, the NCAA recognizes All-Americans selected by the AP, AFCA, FWAA, TSN, and the WCFF to determine consensus and unanimous All-Americans.

The following players were recognized as consensus All-Americans for 2022. Fourteen of them were recognized unanimously. Unanimous selections are followed by an asterisk (*).

2022 Consensus All-Americans*
Name	Position	Year	University
Caleb Williams*	Quarterback	Soph.	USC
Blake Corum*	Running back	Jr.	Michigan
Bijan Robinson*	Running back	Jr.	Texas
Marvin Harrison Jr.*	Wide receiver	Soph.	Ohio State
Jalin Hyatt*	Wide receiver	Jr.	Tennessee
Michael Mayer	Tight end	Jr.	Notre Dame
Steve Avila	Offensive line	Sr.	TCU
Paris Johnson Jr.	Offensive line	Jr.	Ohio State
Peter Skoronski*	Offensive line	Jr.	Northwestern
O'Cyrus Torrence	Offensive line	Sr.	Florida
Olu Oluwatimi	Center	Sr.	Michigan
Jalen Carter*	Defensive line	Jr.	Georgia
Isaiah Foskey	Defensive line	Sr.	Notre Dame
Calijah Kancey*	Defensive line	Jr.	Pittsburgh
Tuli Tuipulotu*	Defensive line	Jr.	USC
Will Anderson Jr.*	Linebacker	Jr.	Alabama
Jack Campbell*	Linebacker	Sr.	Iowa
Ivan Pace Jr.*	Linebacker	Sr.	Cincinnati
Emmanuel Forbes	Defensive back	Jr.	Mississippi State
Clark Phillips III*	Defensive back	Jr.	Utah
Christopher Smith II*	Defensive back	Sr.	Georgia
Devon Witherspoon	Defensive back	Jr.	Illinois
Christopher Dunn	Kicker	Sr.	NC State
Bryce Baringer	Punter	Sr.	Michigan State
Deuce Vaughn	All-purpose / return specialist	Jr.	Kansas State

== Offense ==
=== Quarterback ===
- Caleb Williams, USC (AP, AFCA, FWAA, TSN, WCFF, ESPN, CBS, FOX, The Athletic, USAT)

=== Running back ===
- Blake Corum, Michigan (AP, AFCA, FWAA, TSN, WCFF, ESPN, CBS, FOX, The Athletic, USAT)
- Bijan Robinson, Texas (AP, AFCA, FWAA, TSN, WCFF, ESPN, CBS, FOX, The Athletic, USAT)

=== Wide receiver ===
- Marvin Harrison Jr., Ohio State (AP, AFCA, FWAA, TSN, WCFF, ESPN, CBS, FOX, The Athletic, USAT)
- Jalin Hyatt, Tennessee (AP, AFCA, FWAA, TSN, WCFF, ESPN, CBS, FOX, The Athletic, USAT)
- Xavier Hutchinson, Iowa State (AP)
- Charlie Jones, Purdue (FOX)

=== Tight end ===
- Brock Bowers, Georgia (AFCA, FWAA, ESPN, USAT)
- Michael Mayer, Notre Dame (AP, TSN, WCFF, CBS, FOX, The Athletic)

=== Offensive line ===
- Joe Alt, Notre Dame (AP, ESPN, CBS)
- Steve Avila, TCU (AFCA, FWAA, WCFF, FOX)
- Cooper Beebe, Kansas State (TSN, ESPN, FOX, The Athletic)
- Paris Johnson Jr., Ohio State (AFCA, FWAA, WCFF, The Athletic)
- Dawand Jones, Ohio State (CBS)
- Alex Palczewski, Illinois (TSN)
- John Michael Schmitz, Minnesota (AP, FWAA, CBS, USAT)
- Peter Skoronski, Northwestern (AP, AFCA, FWAA, TSN, WCFF, ESPN, CBS, FOX, The Athletic, USAT)
- O'Cyrus Torrence, Florida (AP, AFCA, TSN, WCFF, ESPN, CBS, The Athletic, USAT)
- Andrew Vorhees, USC (AP, FOX, USAT)

=== Center ===
- Olu Oluwatimi, Michigan (AFCA, FWAA, TSN, WCFF, ESPN, FOX, The Athletic, USAT)

== Defense ==
=== Defensive line ===
- Felix Anudike-Uzomah, Kansas State (USAT)
- Jalen Carter, Georgia (AP, AFCA, FWAA, TSN, WCFF, ESPN, CBS, FOX, The Athletic, USAT)
- Isaiah Foskey, Notre Dame (AFCA, WCFF)
- Calijah Kancey, Pittsburgh (AP, AFCA, FWAA, TSN, WCFF, ESPN, FOX, CBS)
- Tuli Tuipulotu, USC (AP, AFCA, FWAA, TSN, WCFF, ESPN, CBS, FOX, The Athletic, USAT)
- Jared Verse, Florida State (The Athletic)
- Tyree Wilson, Texas Tech (FWAA, The Athletic, USAT)

=== Linebacker ===
- Will Anderson Jr., Alabama (AP [Defensive Lineman], AFCA, FWAA, TSN, WCFF, ESPN, CBS, FOX, The Athletic, USAT)
- Jack Campbell, Iowa (AP, AFCA, FWAA, TSN, WCFF, ESPN, CBS, The Athletic, USAT)
- Jamon Dumas-Johnson, Georgia (TSN, ESPN)
- Ivan Pace Jr., Cincinnati (AP, AFCA, FWAA, TSN, WCFF, ESPN, CBS, FOX, The Athletic, USAT)
- Drew Sanders, Arkansas (AP)
- Nick Herbig, Wisconsin (FOX)

=== Defensive back ===
- Brian Branch, Alabama (ESPN, CBS)
- Emmanuel Forbes, Mississippi State (AFCA, FWAA, WCFF, ESPN, FOX, The Athletic)
- Tre Tomlinson, TCU (AP, TSN, ESPN, USAT)
- Kamren Kinchens, Miami (FL) (AP, TSN, ESPN, CBS, The Athletic, USAT)
- Kaevon Merriweather, Iowa (CBS)
- Clark Phillips III, Utah (AP, AFCA, FWAA, TSN, WCFF, CBS, FOX, The Athletic, USAT)
- Christopher Smith II, Georgia (AP, AFCA, FWAA, TSN, WCFF, USAT)
- Devon Witherspoon, Illinois (AP, AFCA, FWAA, WCFF, CBS, FOX, The Athletic)
- Joey Porter Jr., Penn State (FOX)

== Special teams ==
=== Kicker ===
- Christopher Dunn, NC State (AP, AFCA, FWAA, WCFF, ESPN, CBS, FOX, The Athletic, USAT)
- Joshua Karty, Stanford (TSN)

=== Punter ===
- Bryce Baringer, Michigan State (AP, AFCA, WCFF, CBS, FOX)
- Adam Korsak, Rutgers (TSN, USAT)
- Kai Kroeger, South Carolina (ESPN, The Athletic)
- Tory Taylor, Iowa (FWAA)

=== Long snapper ===
- Michael Vinson, Notre Dame (AFCA)

=== All-purpose / return specialist ===
- Israel Abanikanda, Pittsburgh (ESPN, CBS)
- Zach Charbonnet, UCLA (FWAA)
- Anthony Gould, Oregon State (TSN, ESPN, CBS)
- Jaylin Lucas, Indiana (WCFF, CBS, FOX, USAT)
- Will Shipley, Clemson (USAT)
- Deuce Vaughn, Kansas State (AP, AFCA, TSN, FOX, The Athletic)
- Derius Davis, TCU (FOX)

== See also ==
- 2022 All-Atlantic Coast Conference football team
- 2022 All-Big 12 Conference football team
- 2022 All-Big Ten Conference football team
- 2022 All-Pac-12 Conference football team
- 2022 All-SEC football team
