= 2022 All-Big Ten Conference football team =

American college football all-star team

The 2022 All-Big Ten Conference football team consists of American football players chosen as All-Big Ten Conference players for the 2022 Big Ten Conference football season. The conference recognizes two official All-Big Ten selectors: (1) the Big Ten conference coaches selected separate offensive and defensive units and named first-, second- and third-team players (the "Coaches" team); and (2) a panel of sports writers and broadcasters covering the Big Ten also selected offensive and defensive units and named first-, second- and third-team players (the "Media" team).

== Key ==
Bold = Consensus first-team selection by both the coaches and media

Coaches = Selected by the Big Ten Conference coaches

Media = Selected by the conference media

== Offensive selections ==
=== Quarterbacks ===
- **C. J. Stroud**, Ohio State (Coaches-1; Media-1)
- Aidan O'Connell, Purdue (Coaches-2; Media-3)
- J. J. McCarthy, Michigan (Coaches-3; Media-2)
- Taulia Tagovailoa, Maryland (Coaches-2)

=== Running backs ===
- **Blake Corum**, Michigan (Coaches-1; Media-1)
- **Mohamed Ibrahim**, Minnesota (Coaches-1; Media-1)
- Braelon Allen, Wisconsin (Coaches-2; Media-2)
- Chase Brown, Illinois (Coaches-2; Media-2)
- Nicholas Singleton, Penn State (Coaches-3; Media-3)
- Miyan Williams, Ohio State (Coaches-3; Media-3)

=== Wide receivers ===
- **Marvin Harrison Jr.**, Ohio State (Coaches-1; Media-1)
- **Charlie Jones**, Purdue (Coaches-1; Media-1)
- Emeka Egbuka, Ohio State (Coaches-2; Media-2)
- Trey Palmer, Nebraska (Coaches-3; Media-2)
- Ronnie Bell, Michigan (Coaches-3; Media-3)
- Jayden Reed, Michigan State (Coaches-2)
- Keon Coleman, Michigan State (Media-3)

=== Centers ===
- **John Michael Schmitz**, Minnesota (Coaches-1; Media-1)
- Olu Oluwatimi, Michigan (Coaches-1; Media-2)
- Alex Pihlstrom, Illinois (Coaches-2)
- Juice Scruggs, Penn State (Coaches-3)
- Luke Wypler, Ohio State (Media-3)

=== Guards ===
- **Zak Zinter**, Michigan (Coaches-1; Media-1)
- Trevor Keegan, Michigan (Coaches-1; Media-2)
- Donovan Jackson, Ohio State (Coaches-2; Media-1)
- Matthew Jones, Ohio State (Coaches-2; Media-2)
- Axel Ruschmeyer, Minnesota (Coaches-3; Media-3)
- Chuck Filiaga, Minnesota (Coaches-3)
- Isaiah Adams, Illinois (Media-3)

=== Tackles ===
- **Paris Johnson Jr.**, Ohio State (Coaches-1; Media-1)
- **Peter Skoronski**, Northwestern (Coaches-1; Media-1)
- Olu Fashanu, Penn State (Coaches-2; Media-3)
- Ryan Hayes, Michigan (Coaches-2; Media-3)
- Dawand Jones, Ohio State (Coaches-3, Media-2)
- Alex Palczewski, Illinois (Coaches-3, Media-2)

=== Tight ends ===
- **Sam LaPorta**, Iowa (Coaches-1; Media-1)
- Payne Durham, Purdue (Coaches-2; Media-2)
- Luke Schoonmaker, Michigan (Coaches-3)
- Brenton Strange, Penn State (Coaches-3)
- Cade Stover, Ohio State (Media-3)

== Defensive selections ==
=== Defensive linemen ===
- **Mike Morris**, Michigan (Coaches-1; Media-1)
- **Johnny Newton**, Illinois (Coaches-1; Media-1)
- **Mazi Smith**, Michigan (Coaches-1; Media-1)
- JT Tuimoloau, Ohio State (Coaches-1; Media-2)
- Zach Harrison, Ohio State (Coaches-2; Media-1)
- Garrett Nelson, Nebraska (Coaches-2; Media-2)
- Lukas Van Ness, Iowa (Coaches-2; Media-2)
- P. J. Mustipher, Penn State (Coaches-2; Media-3)
- Keith Randolph, Illinois (Coaches-3; Media-3)
- Keeanu Benton, Wisconsin (Coaches-3)
- Adisa Isaac, Penn State (Coaches-3)
- Aaron Lewis, Rutgers (Coaches-3)
- Joe Evans, Iowa (Media-2)
- Adetomiwa Adebawore, Northwestern (Media-3)
- Mike Hall Jr., Ohio State (Media-3)

=== Linebackers ===
- **Jack Campbell**, Iowa (Coaches-1; Media-1)
- **Tommy Eichenberg**, Ohio State (Coaches-1; Media-1)
- **Nick Herbig**, Wisconsin (Coaches-1; Media-1)
- Seth Benson, Iowa (Coaches-2; Media-2)
- Cal Haladay, Michigan State (Coaches-2; Media-2)
- Junior Colson, Michigan (Coaches-2; Media-3)
- Abdul Carter, Penn State (Coaches-3; Media-2)
- Michael Barrett, Michigan (Coaches-3)
- Mariano Sori-Marin, Minnesota (Coaches-3)
- Bryce Gallagher, Northwestern (Media-3)
- Maema Njongmeta, Wisconsin (Media-3)

=== Defensive backs ===
- **Joey Porter Jr.**, Penn State (Coaches-1; Media-1)
- **Devon Witherspoon**, Illinois (Coaches-1; Media-1)
- Sydney Brown, Illinois (Coaches-1; Media-2)
- Riley Moss, Iowa (Coaches-1; Media-2)
- Cooper DeJean, Iowa (Coaches-2; Media-1)
- John Torchio, Wisconsin (Coaches-2; Media-1)
- Tyler Nubin, Minnesota (Coaches-2; Media-2)
- D. J. Turner, Michigan (Coaches-2; Media-3)
- Quan Martin, Illinois (Coaches-3; Media-2)
- Ji'Ayir Brown, Penn State (Coaches-3; Media-3)
- Ronnie Hickman, Ohio State (Coaches-3; Media-3)
- Kalen King, Penn State (Coaches-3; Media-3)

== Special teams ==
=== Kickers ===
- **Jake Moody**, Michigan (Coaches-1; Media-1)
- Drew Stevens, Iowa (Coaches-3; Media-2)
- Chad Ryland, Maryland (Coaches-2)
- Noah Ruggles, Ohio State (Media-3)

=== Punters ===
- Bryce Baringer, Michigan State (Coaches-1; Media-2)
- Tory Taylor, Iowa (Coaches-3; Media-1)
- Adam Korsak, Rutgers (Coaches-2; Media-3)

=== Return specialist ===
- **Jaylin Lucas**, Indiana (Coaches-1; Media-1)
- A. J. Henning, Michigan (Coaches-2; Media-2)
- Nicholas Singleton, Penn State (Media-2)
- Aron Cruikshank, Rutgers (Coaches-3)
- Jayden Reed, Michigan State (Media-3)
