= Bryce Baringer =

American football player (born 1999)

Profile
- Position: Punter

Personal information
- Born: April 26, 1999 (age 27); Waterford Township, Michigan, U.S.
- Listed height: 6 ft 2 in (1.88 m)
- Listed weight: 215 lb (98 kg)

Career information
- High school: Notre Dame Preparatory (Pontiac, Michigan)
- College: Illinois (2017); Michigan State (2018–2022)
- NFL draft: 2023: 6th round, 192nd overall pick

Career history
- New England Patriots (2023–2026)

Awards and highlights
- PFWA All-Rookie Team (2023); Consensus All-American (2022); Big Ten Punter of the Year (2022); First-team All-Big Ten (2022); Second-team All-Big Ten (2021)

Career NFL statistics as of 2025
- Punts: 219
- Punting yards: 10,500
- Punting average: 47.9
- Longest punt: 79
- Inside 20: 90
- Touchbacks: 20
- Stats at Pro Football Reference

Bryce Baringer (BEAR-ringer; born April 26, 1999) is an American professional football punter. He played college football for the Illinois Fighting Illini and Michigan State and was selected by the New England Patriots in the sixth round of the 2023 NFL draft.

== Early life ==
Baringer was born and grew up in Waterford, Michigan and attended Notre Dame Preparatory School and Marist Academy. He initially signed a National Letter of Intent to play college football at Southern Illinois, but was granted a release and committed to play at Illinois as a preferred walk-on.

== College career ==
Baringer began his college career at Illinois, where he redshirted his true freshman season. After the season, he transferred to Michigan State University.

Baringer enrolled at Michigan State and originally did not plan on continuing his football career until he was contacted by the Spartans coaching staff. He took part in two tryouts, but was not offered a spot on the roster after either one. Baringer eventually joined the team after punters Jake Hartbarger and Tyler Hunt both suffered injuries during the 2018 season. He played in four games and punted 15 times for an average of 32.4 yards. Baringer was cut by the Spartans entering the 2019 season after the team added Australian punter Jack Bouwmeester to their recruiting class.

Baringer continued to practice punting independently and was offered to rejoin the team after Bouwmeester left the team at the conclusion of the season. He entered his redshirt junior season competing with Mitchell Crawford, a graduate transfer from UTEP, but ultimately won the punting job early in the season and averaged 43.6 yards per punt on 37 punts. As a redshirt senior, Baringer punted 59 times for a Michigan State record 48.4 yard average and was named second team All-Big Ten Conference. Baringer used the extra year of eligibility granted to college athletes in 2020 due to the COVID-19 pandemic and returned to Michigan State for a sixth year. He entered his final season ranked as the best punting prospect for the 2023 NFL Draft by ESPN analyst Mel Kiper.

== Professional career ==
Pre-draft measurables
Height	Weight	Arm length	Hand span	Wingspan
6 ft 1 3/4 in (1.87 m)	216 lb (98 kg)	30 1/2 in (0.77 m)	9 in (0.23 m)	6 ft 2 1/4 in (1.89 m)
All values from NFL Combine

Baringer was selected by the New England Patriots in the sixth round, 192nd overall, of the 2023 NFL draft. He signed a standard four-year rookie contract with a total value of about $4.02 million, including a signing bonus of $178,459. He was named to the PFWA NFL All-Rookie Team.

Baringer started his career with a punt of at least 50 yards in each of his first 26 games. The streak ended in Week 11 of the NFL 2024 season.

In the 2025 season, Baringer punted 51 times for 2,416 yards for a 47.4 average. In Super Bowl LX, he punted eight times for a 44.5 average in the 29–13 loss to the Seattle Seahawks.

On September 1, 2026, Baringer was placed on injured reserve. On October 26, he was released by the Patriots.

== NFL career statistics ==
Legend
	Led the league
**Bold**	Career high

=== Regular season ===
Year	Team	GP	Punting							
Year	Team	GP	Punts	Yds	Lng	Avg	Net Avg	Blk	Ins20	RetY
2023	NE	**17**	**98**	**4,598**	**79**	46.9	40.8	0	**38**	**441**
2024	NE	**17**	70	3,486	75	**49.8**	**41.7**	0	31	406
2025	NE	**17**	51	2,416	73	47.4	40.6	0	21	265
Career		51	219	10,500	79	47.9	41.0	0	90	1,112

=== Postseason ===
Year	Team	GP	Punting							
Year	Team	GP	Punts	Yds	Lng	Avg	Net Avg	Blk	Ins20	RetY
2025	NE	**3**	**19**	**766**	**55**	**40.3**	**37.3**	0	**6**	**37**
Career		3	19	766	55	40.3	37.3	0	6	37

== Personal life ==
Baringer is a close friend of professional golfer James Piot, who was also his roommate at Michigan State.
