= Jaylin Lucas =

American football player (born 2004)

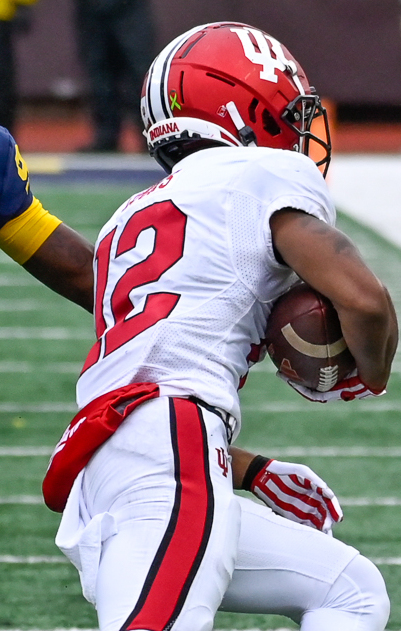
- Lucas in 2023

Tulane Green Wave
- Position: Running back
- Class: Junior

Personal information
- Born: September 24, 2004 (age 22); Houma, Louisiana, U.S.
- Listed height: 5 ft 9 in (1.75 m)
- Listed weight: 175 lb (79 kg)

Career information
- High school: Edna Karr High School (New Orleans, Louisiana)
- College: Indiana (2022–2023); Florida State (2024–2025); Tulane (2026–present)

Awards and highlights
- First-team All-American (2022); Big Ten Return Specialist of the Year (2022); First Team All-Big Ten (2022); Third-team All-Big Ten (2023)
- Stats at ESPN

Jaylin Lucas (born September 24, 2004) is an American college football running back and return specialist for the Tulane Green Wave. He previously played for the Indiana Hoosiers, earning All-American honors in 2022 and the Florida State Seminoles.

== Early life ==
Lucas attended Terrebonne High School in Houma, Louisiana for three years before transferring to Edna Karr High School in New Orleans after his family was forced to relocate due to Hurricane Ida. A three star recruit, Lucas originally committed to play college football at Tulane, before flipping to Indiana.

== College career ==
=== Indiana ===
As a freshman, Lucas served as a rotational running back and as a punt/kick returner, and was the only player in FBS football with multiple kick returns for touchdowns. At the conclusion of his freshman season, Lucas was named the Big Ten Rodgers–Dwight Return Specialist of the Year and a member of the first team All-Big Ten as a return-man.

On December 6, 2023, Lucas announced that he would be entering the transfer portal.

=== Florida State ===
On January 7, 2024, Lucas announced that he would be transferring to Florida State. On December 10, 2025, Lucas entered the transfer portal.

=== Tulane ===
On January 6, 2026, Lucas announced he would be transferring to play for the Tulane Green Wave. In week 2 against the South Alabama Jaguars, Lucas ran for 214 yards and a touchdown on 11 carries.
