= John Michael Schmitz =

American football player (born 1999)

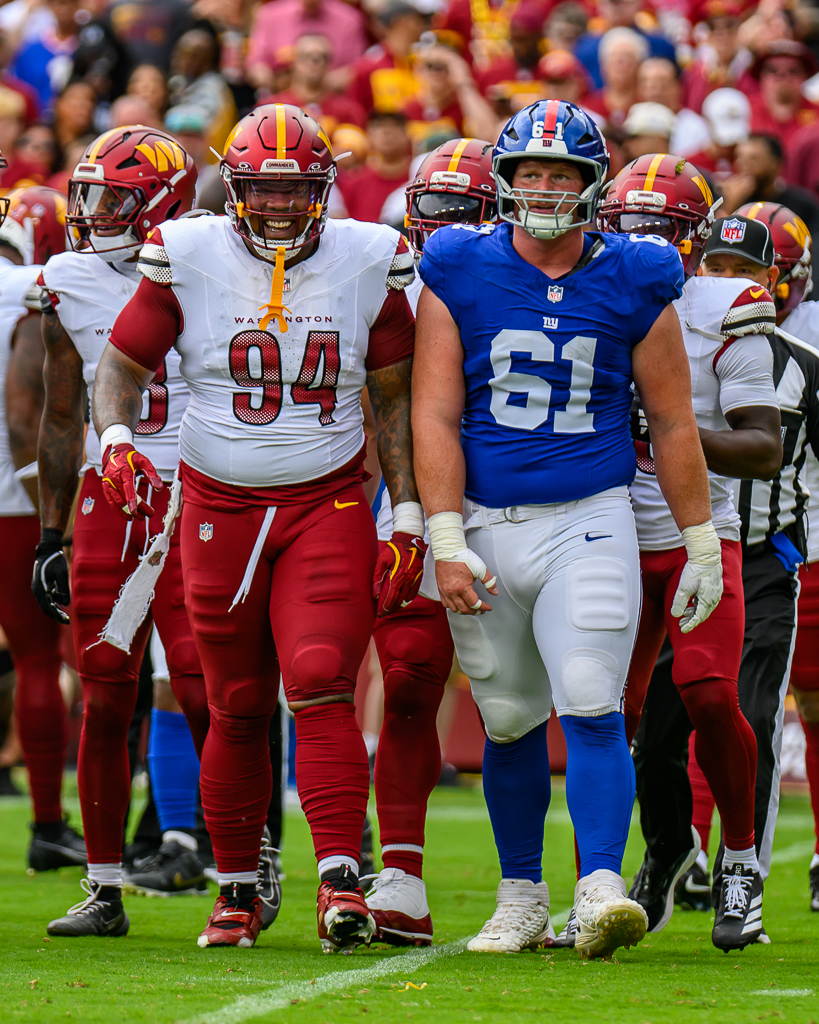
- Schmitz (#61) in 2025

No. 61 – New York Giants
- Position: Center
- Roster status: Active

Personal information
- Born: March 19, 1999 (age 27); Flossmoor, Illinois, U.S.
- Listed height: 6 ft 4 in (1.93 m)
- Listed weight: 301 lb (137 kg)

Career information
- High school: Homewood-Flossmoor
- College: Minnesota (2017–2022)
- NFL draft: 2023: 2nd round, 57th overall pick

Career history
- New York Giants (2023–present)

Awards and highlights
- First-team All-American (2022); First-team All-Big Ten (2022); Second-team All-Big Ten (2021)

Career NFL statistics as of Week 4, 2026
- Games started: 44
- Games played: 44
- Stats at Pro Football Reference

John Michael Schmitz Jr. (born March 19, 1999) is an American professional football center for the New York Giants of the National Football League (NFL). He played college football for the Minnesota Golden Gophers, where he was named a first-team All-American.

== Early life ==
Schmitz was born on March 19, 1999, in Flossmoor, Illinois, and attended Homewood-Flossmoor High School. Schmitz initially committed to play college football at Western Michigan under coach P. J. Fleck. He later flipped his commitment to Minnesota after Fleck was hired there.

== College career ==
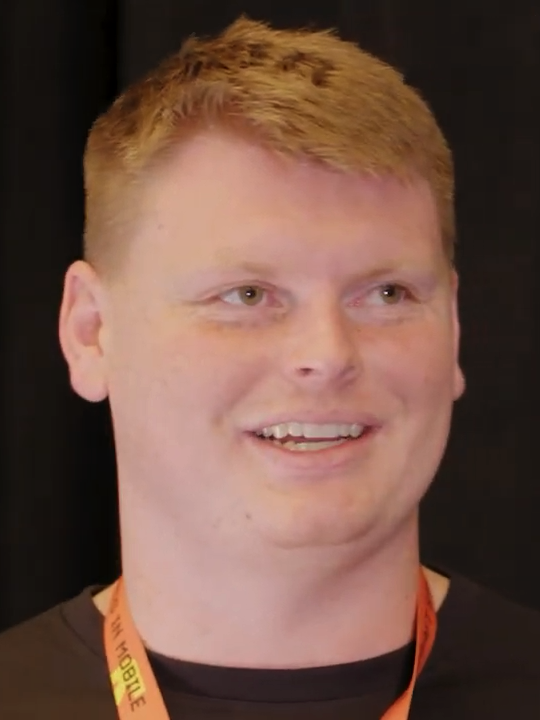
Schmitz in 2023

Schmitz redshirted his true freshman season at Minnesota. He played in all 13 of the Golden Gophers' games as a redshirt freshman, appearing mostly on special teams. Schmitz was named Minnesota's starting center entering his redshirt junior season and was named honorable mention All-Big Ten Conference. He was named second team All-Big Ten in 2021. Schmitz used the extra year of eligibility granted to college athletes in 2020 due to the COVID-19 pandemic and returned to Minnesota for 2022.

== Professional career ==
Pre-draft measurables
Height	Weight	Arm length	Hand span	Wingspan	40-yard dash	10-yard split	20-yard split	20-yard shuttle	Vertical jump	Broad jump	Bench press
6 ft 3 1/2 in (1.92 m)	301 lb (137 kg)	32 5/8 in (0.83 m)	9 1/2 in (0.24 m)	6 ft 6 3/8 in (1.99 m)	5.35 s	1.85 s	3.03 s	4.56 s	29.5 in (0.75 m)	8 ft 8 in (2.64 m)	26 reps
All values from NFL Combine

Schmitz was selected by the New York Giants in the second round, 57th overall, of the 2023 NFL draft. As a rookie, he appeared in and started 13 games in the 2023 season. In the 2024 season, he appeared in and started 15 games.

Schmitz entered the 2025 campaign as New York's starting center. On December 27, 2025, Schmitz was placed on season-ending injured reserve due to a finger injury.
