= Peter Skoronski =

American football player (born 2001)

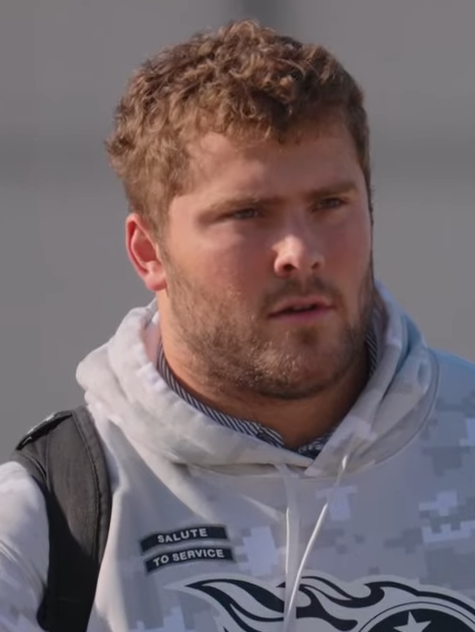
- Skoronski with the Tennessee Titans in 2024

No. 77 – Tennessee Titans
- Position: Guard
- Roster status: Injured reserve

Personal information
- Born: July 31, 2001 (age 25); Park Ridge, Illinois, U.S.
- Listed height: 6 ft 4 in (1.93 m)
- Listed weight: 330 lb (150 kg)

Career information
- High school: Maine South (Park Ridge)
- College: Northwestern (2020–2022)
- NFL draft: 2023: 1st round, 11th overall pick

Career history
- Tennessee Titans (2023–present)

Awards and highlights
- Unanimous All-American (2022); Big Ten Offensive Lineman of the Year (2022); 2× First-team All-Big Ten (2021, 2022); Second-team All-Big Ten (2020)

Career NFL statistics as of 2025
- Games started: 48
- Games played: 48
- Stats at Pro Football Reference

Peter John Skoronski (born July 31, 2001) is an American professional football guard for the Tennessee Titans of the National Football League (NFL). He played college football for the Northwestern Wildcats, where he was the first unanimous All-American in school history, before being selected by the Titans in the first round of the 2023 NFL draft.

== Early life ==
Skoronski attended Maine South High School in Park Ridge, Illinois. He was selected to play in the 2020 All-American Bowl.

== College career ==
Skoronski committed to Northwestern University to play college football. He started all nine games his freshman year at Northwestern in 2020 as left offensive tackle. As a sophomore in 2021, he started all 12 games and was named first-team All-Big Ten. As a junior in 2022, he was named a unanimous All-American, the first in program history.

== Professional career ==
Pre-draft measurables
Height	Weight	Arm length	Hand span	Wingspan	40-yard dash	10-yard split	20-yard split	Three-cone drill	Vertical jump	Broad jump	Bench press
6 ft 4 in (1.93 m)	313 lb (142 kg)	32 1/4 in (0.82 m)	10 in (0.25 m)	6 ft 7 1/2 in (2.02 m)	5.16 s	1.75 s	2.90 s	7.80 s	34.5 in (0.88 m)	9 ft 7 in (2.92 m)	30 reps
All values from the NFL Combine

Skoronski was selected 11th overall by the Tennessee Titans in the first round of the 2023 NFL draft. Although originally drafted at offensive tackle, he was named as the starting left guard for the Titans ahead of the 2023 season. He appeared in and started 14 games during his rookie season.

During the 2024 season, Skoronski started all 17 games, and played every offensive snap.

On April 18, 2026, the Titans exercised the fifth-year option of Skoronski's rookie contract that would pay him $19.07 million in the 2027 season. On August 7, the Titans signed Skoronski to a four-year, $100 million contract extension which included $88 million guaranteed, making him the highest paid guard in the NFL.

== Personal life ==
He is the grandson of Bob Skoronski, who won five NFL championships as an offensive tackle for the Green Bay Packers.
