= Cameron Mitchell (American football) =

American football player (born 2001)

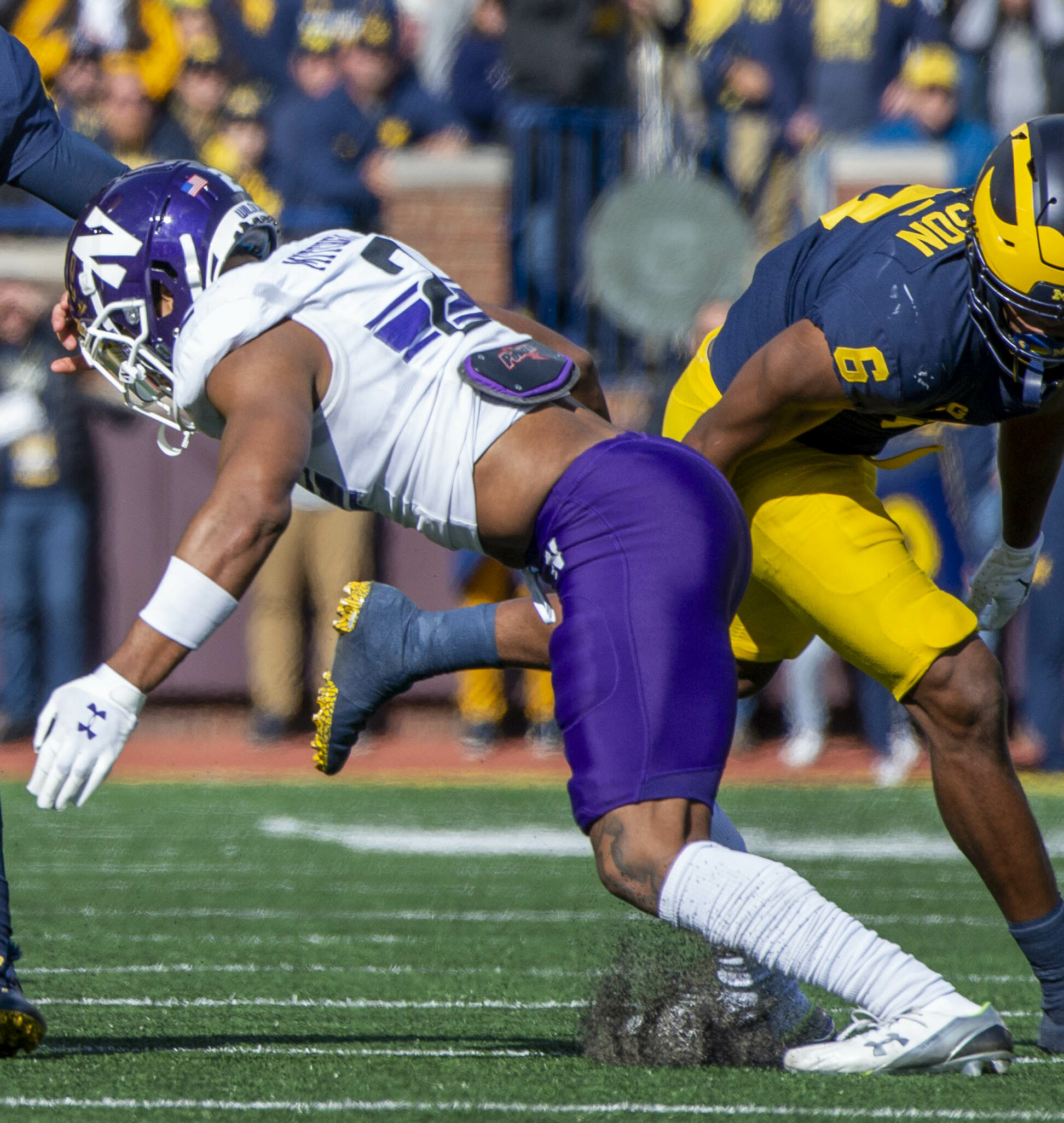
- Mitchell with the Northwestern Wildcats in 2021

No. 43 – Indianapolis Colts
- Position: Cornerback
- Roster status: Injured reserve

Personal information
- Born: September 8, 2001 (age 25); Bolingbrook, Illinois, U.S.
- Listed height: 5 ft 11 in (1.80 m)
- Listed weight: 191 lb (87 kg)

Career information
- High school: Bolingbrook
- College: Northwestern (2019–2022)
- NFL draft: 2023: 5th round, 142nd overall pick

Career history
- Cleveland Browns (2023–2025); Indianapolis Colts (2025–present)

Career NFL statistics as of 2025
- Total tackles: 48
- Sacks: 1.0
- Forced fumbles: 1
- Pass deflections: 4
- Stats at Pro Football Reference

Cameron Mitchell (born September 8, 2001) is an American professional football cornerback for the Indianapolis Colts. He played college football for the Northwestern Wildcats and was selected by the Cleveland Browns in the fifth round of the 2023 NFL draft.

== Early life ==
Mitchell grew up in Bolingbrook, Illinois and attended Bolingbrook High School.

== College career ==
Mitchell played in four games during his true freshman season at Northwestern before redshirting. He became a starter as a redshirt sophomore and was named honorable mention All-Big Ten Conference after making 48 tackles and breaking up six passes. Mitchell repeated as an honorable mention All-Big Ten as a redshirt junior.

== Professional career ==
Pre-draft measurables
Height	Weight	Arm length	Hand span	Wingspan	40-yard dash	10-yard split	20-yard split	20-yard shuttle	Three-cone drill	Vertical jump	Bench press
5 ft 10 3/4 in (1.80 m)	191 lb (87 kg)	31 3/8 in (0.80 m)	9 3/4 in (0.25 m)	6 ft 4 1/8 in (1.93 m)	4.47 s	1.48 s	2.55 s	4.06 s	6.89 s	35.0 in (0.89 m)	15 reps
All values from NFL Combine/Pro Day

=== Cleveland Browns ===
Mitchell was selected by the Cleveland Browns in the fifth round, 142nd overall, of the 2023 NFL draft. He was placed on injured reserve on November 7, 2023, and activated on December 9.

On September 30, 2025, Mitchell was waived by the Browns.

=== Indianapolis Colts ===
On October 4, 2025, the Indianapolis Colts signed Mitchell to the team's practice squad. He was promoted to the team's active roster on November 1. Mitchell was waived on November 22 and re-signed to the practice squad three days later. On December 9, he was signed to the active roster.

On March 19, 2026, Mitchell re-signed with the Colts. On August 3, he was waived with an injury designation.
