= Evan Hull =

American football player (born 2000)

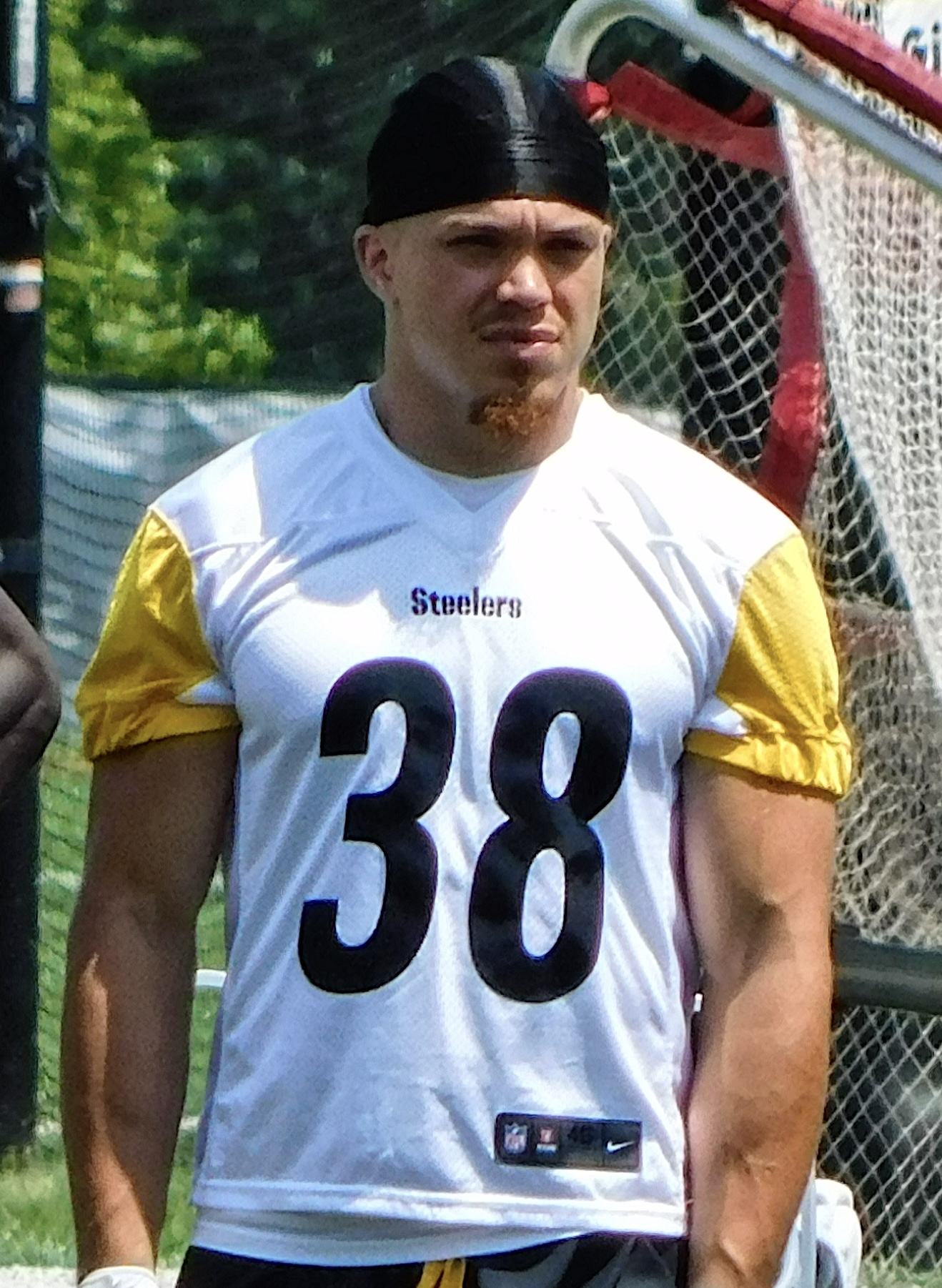
- Hull with the Pittsburgh Steelers in 2025

No. 26 – Arizona Cardinals
- Position: Running back
- Roster status: Active

Personal information
- Born: October 26, 2000 (age 26); Maple Grove, Minnesota, U.S.
- Listed height: 5 ft 10 in (1.78 m)
- Listed weight: 209 lb (95 kg)

Career information
- High school: Maple Grove
- College: Northwestern (2019–2022)
- NFL draft: 2023: 5th round, 176th overall pick

Career history
- Indianapolis Colts (2023–2024); Pittsburgh Steelers (2025)*; New Orleans Saints (2025); Houston Texans (2026)*; Arizona Cardinals (2026–present)
- * Offseason or practice squad member only

Career NFL statistics as of 2025
- Rushing yards: 49
- Rushing average: 2.5
- Receptions: 2
- Receiving yards: 12
- Stats at Pro Football Reference

Evan Hull (born October 26, 2000) is an American professional football running back for the Arizona Cardinals of the National Football League (NFL). He played college football for the Northwestern Wildcats and was selected by the Indianapolis Colts in the fifth round of the 2023 NFL draft.

== Early life ==
Hull was born on October 26, 2000, in Maple Grove, Minnesota. He attended Maple Grove Senior High School and was one of the best running backs in the state, posting over 2,100 rushing yards in one year. He is Maple Grove's all-time leading rusher, and additionally was a top athlete in wrestling and track and field. He set numerous team rushing records, including rushing yards in a game with 398. A three-star recruit, Hull committed to play college football at Northwestern.

== College career ==
Hull appeared in four games as a true freshman, preserving a redshirt. He still managed to post 286 rushing yards and four touchdowns, the latter of which placed second on the team. His best game of the season was a 220-yard, four score performance against UMass. The following year, he appeared in seven games and recorded 209 yards on 25 rush attempts, scoring two touchdowns in a season impacted by COVID-19.

Hull became a starter in 2021, and recorded 1,009 rushing yards, placing sixth in the Big Ten Conference. He also scored seven rushing touchdowns, which ranked eighth in the conference, earning at the end of the year honorable mention All-Big Ten from the league's coaches and media. He additionally gained 264 receiving yards off 33 receptions, scoring two more touchdowns through the air. Hull appeared in all 12 games during the 2022 season, posting 913 rushing yards and five touchdowns, with an additional 55 receptions for 546 yards and two scores. He decided to enter the NFL draft following the season, and finished his stint at Northwestern with 488 rush attempts for 2,417 yards and 18 touchdowns, as well as 94 catches for 851 yards and four touchdowns in 35 games.

== Professional career ==
Pre-draft measurables
| Height | Weight | Arm length | Hand span | Wingspan | 40-yard dash | 10-yard split | 20-yard split | 20-yard shuttle | Three-cone drill | Vertical jump | Broad jump | Bench press |
|---|---|---|---|---|---|---|---|---|---|---|---|---|
| 5 ft 10 1/8 in (1.78 m) | 209 lb (95 kg) | 30 5/8 in (0.78 m) | 9 1/4 in (0.23 m) | 6 ft 2 3/8 in (1.89 m) | 4.47 s | 1.53 s | 2.55 s | 4.22 s | 6.90 s | 37.0 in (0.94 m) | 10 ft 3 in (3.12 m) | 21 reps |
All values from NFL Combine/Pro Day

=== Indianapolis Colts ===
Hull was selected in the fifth round (176th overall) of the 2023 NFL draft by the Indianapolis Colts, through a compensatory selection acquired by trading Stephon Gilmore to the Dallas Cowboys. He was placed on injured reserve on September 12.

Hull was waived by the Colts on August 27, 2024, and re-signed to the practice squad. He was promoted to the active roster on October 12. He was waived on October 26, and re-signed to the practice squad.

=== Pittsburgh Steelers ===
On January 14, 2025, Hull signed a reserve/future contract with the Pittsburgh Steelers. He was released by the Steelers on August 22.

=== New Orleans Saints ===
On October 29, 2025, Hull was signed to the New Orleans Saints' practice squad. On November 25, he was signed to the active roster. In six appearances for New Orleans, Hull recorded 19 rush attempts for 48 scoreless yards, as well as one reception for six yards.

On April 27, 2026, Hull was waived by the Saints.

=== Houston Texans ===
On May 12, 2026, Hull signed with the Houston Texans. He was waived by the Texans on August 2.

=== Arizona Cardinals ===
On August 3, 2026, the Arizona Cardinals claimed Hull off waivers. Hull was waived by Arizona as a part of final roster cuts on August 30; he was re-signed to the team's practice squad the following day. He was promoted to the active roster on October 24.

== NFL career statistics ==
| Year | Team | Games | | Rushing | | | | | Receiving | | | | | Kick returns | | | | | Fumbles | |
| Year | Team | GP | GS | Att | Yds | Avg | Lng | TD | Rec | Yds | Avg | Lng | TD | Ret | Yds | Avg | Lng | TD | Fum | Lost |
|---|---|---|---|---|---|---|---|---|---|---|---|---|---|---|---|---|---|---|---|---|
| 2023 | IND | 1 | 0 | 1 | 1 | 1.0 | 1 | 0 | 1 | 6 | 6.0 | 6 | 0 | — | — | — | — | — | 0 | 0 |
| 2024 | IND | 1 | 0 | — | — | — | — | — | — | — | — | — | — | — | — | — | — | — | — | — |
| 2025 | NO | 6 | 0 | 19 | 48 | 2.5 | 8 | 0 | 1 | 6 | 6.0 | 6 | 0 | 7 | 179 | 25.6 | 29 | 0 | 0 | 0 |
| Career | | 8 | 0 | 20 | 49 | 2.5 | 8 | 0 | 2 | 12 | 6.0 | 6 | 0 | 7 | 179 | 25.6 | 29 | 0 | 0 | 0 |
