= Isaiah Adams =

Canadian gridiron football player (born 2000)

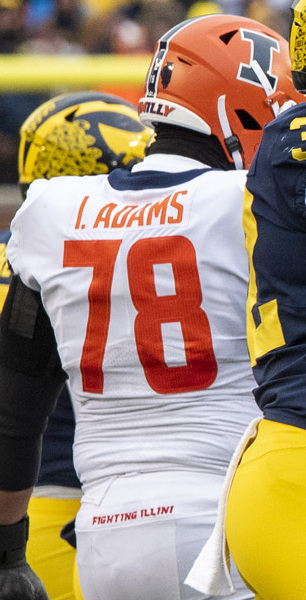
- Adams with Illinois in 2022

No. 74 – Arizona Cardinals
- Position: Guard
- Roster status: Active

Personal information
- Born: July 21, 2000 (age 26); Ajax, Ontario, Canada
- Listed height: 6 ft 4 in (1.93 m)
- Listed weight: 315 lb (143 kg)

Career information
- High school: Father MacLellan Catholic (Ajax, Ontario)
- College: Wilfrid Laurier (2018–2019); Garden City CC (2021); Illinois (2022–2023)
- NFL draft: 2024: 3rd round, 71st overall pick

Career history
- Arizona Cardinals (2024–present)

Awards and highlights
- Third-team All-Big Ten (2022)

Career NFL statistics as of 2025
- Games played: 32
- Games started: 16
- Stats at Pro Football Reference

Isaiah Adams (born July 21, 2000) is a Canadian professional football guard for the Arizona Cardinals of the National Football League (NFL). He played college football for the Illinois Fighting Illini and was selected by the Cardinals in the third round of the 2024 NFL draft.

== Early life ==
Adams attended high school at Father McLellan Catholic Highschool. Adams also played for the Durham Dolphins Football Club, who play out of Ajax, Ontario.

== College career ==
=== Wilfrid Laurier University ===
Adams began his university career with Laurier in 2018, playing in nine games, one in 2018 and eight in 2019. Adams transferred to Garden City after the 2019 season.

=== Garden City CC ===
In Adams's one season at Garden City, he was named NJCAA D1 All-America first team.

=== Illinois ===
Adams decided to commit to play Division I football for the Illinois Fighting Illini. Adams finished the 2022 season by playing in 13 games while starting twelve at left guard and one start at left tackle. During the 2022 season, Adams was ranked as the 11th best blocking guard in the nation and the 2nd best in the Big Ten. For his performance on the 2022 season, Adams was named third team all Big-Ten. Adams helped the Fighting Illini to be semifinalists for the Joe Moore Award which is awarded to the nation's best offensive line. During the 2023 season, Adams played in and started 12 games, while being a captain, and a big ten honorable mention selection.

In Adam's career for the Fighting Illini, he played in and started 25 games.

== Professional career ==
Pre-draft measurables
Height	Weight	Arm length	Hand span	Wingspan	40-yard dash	10-yard split	20-yard split	20-yard shuttle	Three-cone drill	Vertical jump	Broad jump	Bench press
6 ft 4 1/4 in (1.94 m)	315 lb (143 kg)	33 7/8 in (0.86 m)	9 in (0.23 m)	6 ft 9 7/8 in (2.08 m)	5.22 s	1.80 s	3.01 s	4.73 s	7.77 s	24.5 in (0.62 m)	8 ft 6 in (2.59 m)	22 reps
All values from NFL Combine

Adams was selected by the Arizona Cardinals in the third round of the 2024 NFL draft with the 71st overall pick. Adams was also the top rated prospect ahead of the 2024 CFL draft, but went undrafted. He appeared in 15 games and started five in the 2024 season for the Cardinals.

== Legal issues ==
In July 2026, Adams was arrested in Durham, Ontario on gun possession charges.
