= Joe Tippmann =

American football player (born 2001)

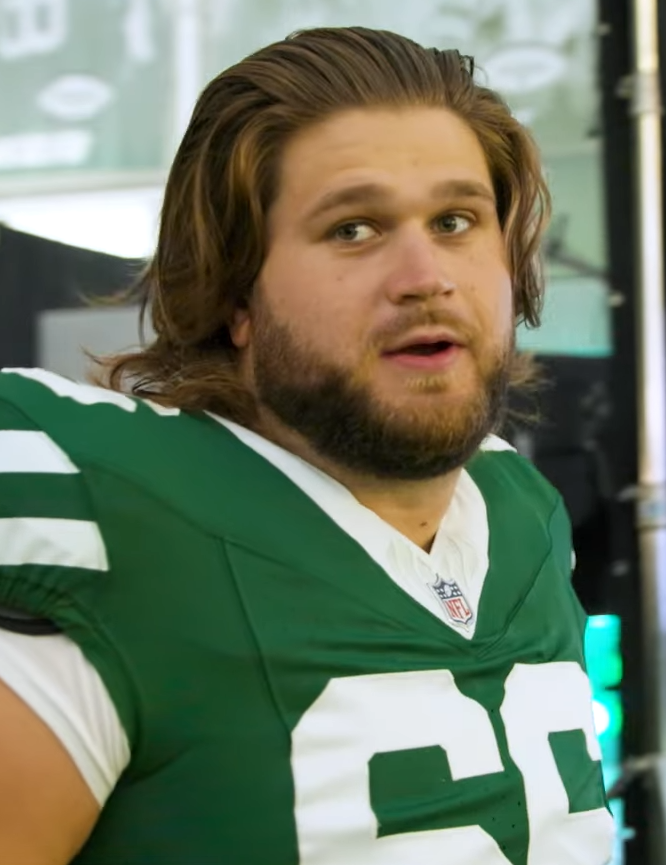
- Tippmann with the New York Jets in 2025

No. 66 – New York Jets
- Position: Guard
- Roster status: Active

Personal information
- Born: March 24, 2001 (age 25); Fort Wayne, Indiana, U.S.
- Listed height: 6 ft 6 in (1.98 m)
- Listed weight: 313 lb (142 kg)

Career information
- High school: Bishop Dwenger (Fort Wayne)
- College: Wisconsin (2019–2022)
- NFL draft: 2023: 2nd round, 43rd overall pick

Career history
- New York Jets (2023–present)

Awards and highlights
- PFWA All-Rookie Team (2023)

Career NFL statistics as of 2025
- Games played: 50
- Games started: 48
- Stats at Pro Football Reference

Joe Tippmann (born March 24, 2001) is an American professional football guard for the New York Jets of the National Football League (NFL). He played college football for the Wisconsin Badgers.

== Early life ==
Tippmann was born in 2001 in Fort Wayne, Indiana and is of German descent.

== College career ==
Tippman played college football at Wisconsin. On December 8, 2022, Tippmann announced his intention to forego his remaining eligibility and enter the 2023 draft.

== Professional career ==
Pre-draft measurables
Height	Weight	Arm length	Hand span	Wingspan
6 ft 6 in (1.98 m)	313 lb (142 kg)	32 3/4 in (0.83 m)	10 3/4 in (0.27 m)	6 ft 8 3/8 in (2.04 m)
All values from the NFL Combine

Tippmann was selected by the New York Jets in the second round, 43rd overall, of the 2023 NFL draft. As a rookie, he appeared in 16 games and started 14 in the 2023 season. He was named to the PFWA All-Rookie Team. In the 2024 season, he started all 17 games.

Tippman was named the starting center for the 2024 season, starting all 17 games. He was then named the starting right guard for the 2025 season following the free agent signing of Josh Myers.

On June 15, 2026, Tippmann signed a four-year, $66.4 million contract extension with the Jets.
