= Olu Oluwatimi =

American football player (born 1999)

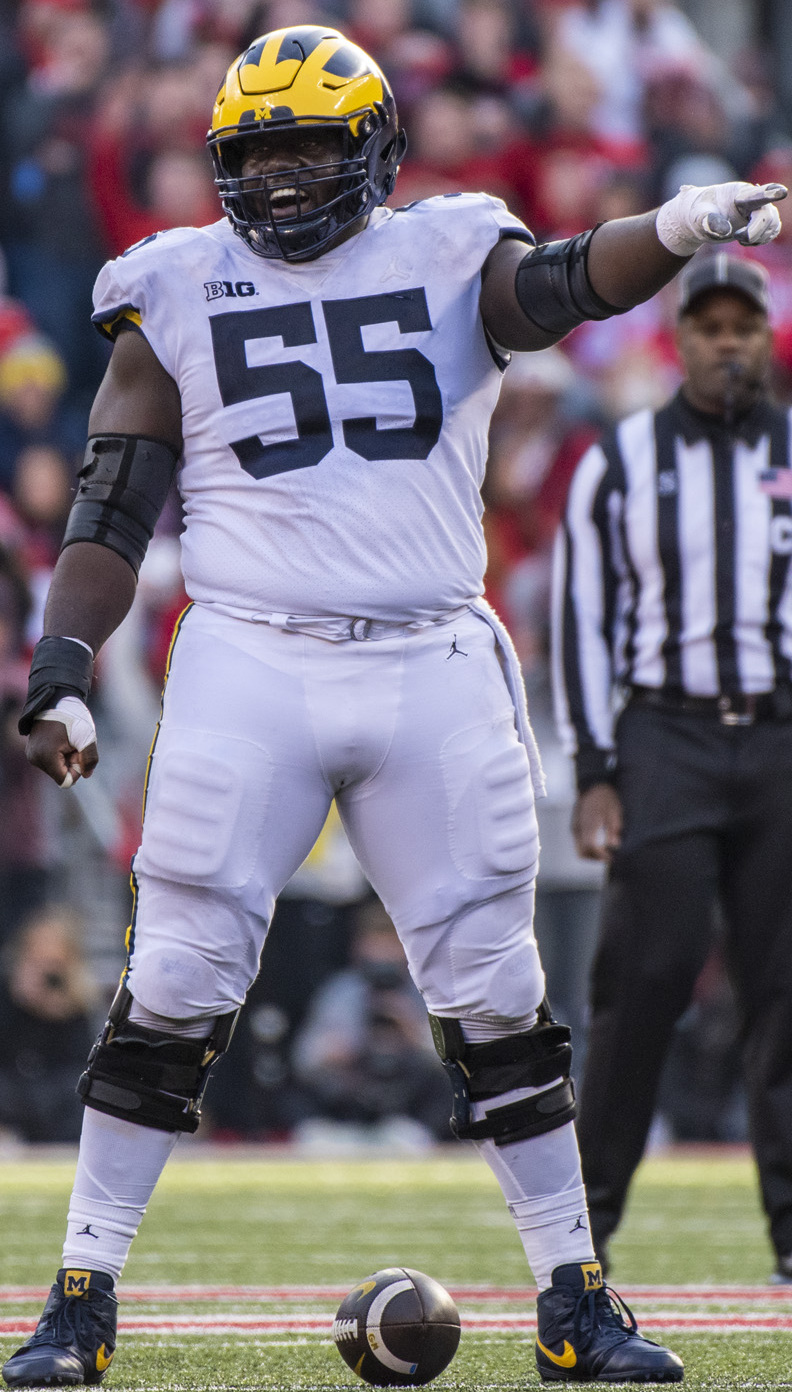
- Oluwatimi with the Michigan Wolverines in 2022

No. 55 – Seattle Seahawks
- Position: Center
- Roster status: Active

Personal information
- Born: August 5, 1999 (age 27); Upper Marlboro, Maryland, U.S.
- Listed height: 6 ft 3 in (1.91 m)
- Listed weight: 309 lb (140 kg)

Career information
- High school: DeMatha Catholic (Hyattsville, Maryland)
- College: Air Force (2017); Virginia (2018–2021); Michigan (2022)
- NFL draft: 2023: 5th round, 154th overall pick

Career history
- Seattle Seahawks (2023–present)

Awards and highlights
- Super Bowl champion (LX); Outland Trophy (2022); Rimington Trophy (2022); Consensus All-American (2022); Second-team All-American (2021); First-team All-Big Ten (2022); Second-team All-ACC (2021)

Career NFL statistics as of Week 3, 2026
- Games played: 38
- Games started: 13
- Stats at Pro Football Reference

Olusegun Oluwatimi (born August 5, 1999) is an American professional football center for the Seattle Seahawks of the National Football League (NFL). He played college football for the Virginia Cavaliers and Michigan Wolverines. He was an All-American with Michigan, winning the Rimington Trophy, Outland Trophy, and the Joe Moore Award in 2022.

== College career ==
Oluwatimi attended DeMatha Catholic High School in Hyattsville, Maryland, before enrolling at the United States Air Force Academy in 2017. He was a member of the Air Force Falcons football team, but did not appear in any games with them.

=== Virginia Cavaliers ===
Oluwatimi transferred to the University of Virginia in 2018 and started 32 consecutive games for the Virginia Cavaliers from 2019 to 2021. In 2021, he was one of the three finalists for the Rimington Trophy, an award presented annually to the best center in the country. He was selected by the Football Writers Association of America as a second-team All-American. Oluwatimi graduated with a degree in economics in 2021.

=== Michigan Wolverines ===
In January 2022, Oluwatimi transferred as a graduate student to play for the Michigan Wolverines at the University of Michigan.

By the end of the season, Oluwatimi retrieved the Outland Trophy as the best interior lineman in college football and the Rimington Trophy as the best center. He was also named a consensus first-team All-American.

== Professional career ==
Pre-draft measurables
Height	Weight	Arm length	Hand span	Wingspan	40-yard dash	10-yard split	20-yard split	20-yard shuttle	Three-cone drill	Vertical jump	Broad jump	Bench press
6 ft 2 1/2 in (1.89 m)	309 lb (140 kg)	32 3/4 in (0.83 m)	8 5/8 in (0.22 m)	6 ft 7 1/4 in (2.01 m)	5.38 s	1.86 s	3.05 s	4.68 s	7.58 s	29.0 in (0.74 m)	9 ft 2 in (2.79 m)	29 reps
All values from NFL Combine/Pro Day

Oluwatimi was drafted by the Seattle Seahawks in the fifth round, 154th overall, of the 2023 NFL draft. Oluwatimi played two of three preseason matches that year, being held out of the second due to injury. Oluwatimi began the regular season as the Seahawks' backup center after losing the job to free-agent signing Evan Brown. As a rookie, he appeared in 16 games and started one in the 2023 season. In the 2024 season, he appeared in 12 games and started eight.

Oluwatimi began the 2025 season as a backup after losing the starting center competition to Jalen Sundell. Oluwatimi assumed starting center duties after Sundell was placed on injured reserve on November 15, 2025.

== Personal life ==
He is of Nigerian descent.
