= Kaevon Merriweather =

American football player (born 1999)

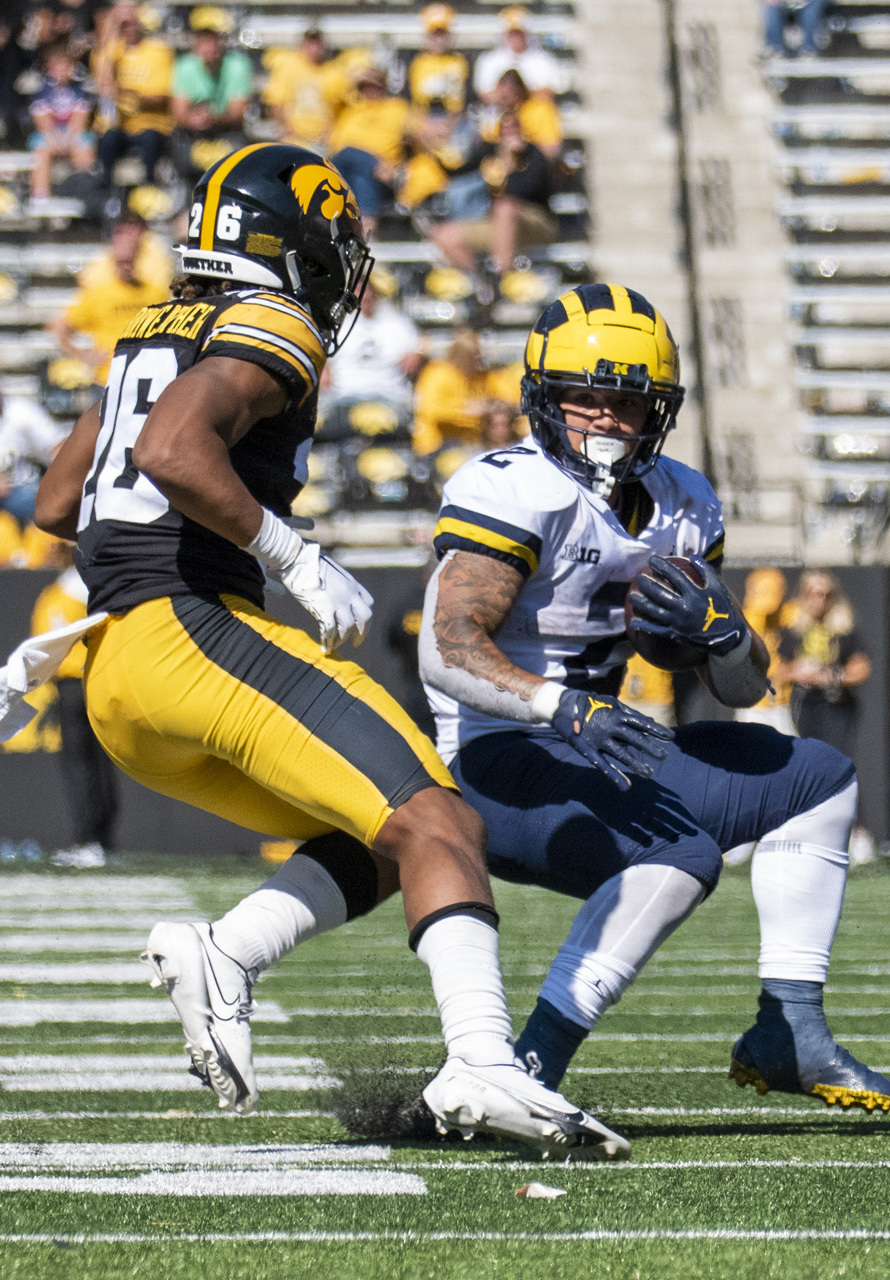
- Merriweather at Iowa (left)

No. 26 – Jacksonville Jaguars
- Position: Safety
- Roster status: Active

Personal information
- Born: December 20, 1999 (age 26); Belleville, Michigan, U.S.
- Listed height: 6 ft 0 in (1.83 m)
- Listed weight: 207 lb (94 kg)

Career information
- High school: Belleville
- College: Iowa (2018–2022)
- NFL draft: 2023: undrafted

Career history
- Tampa Bay Buccaneers (2023–2024); Detroit Lions (2024)*; Tampa Bay Buccaneers (2024–2025); Houston Texans (2025); Jacksonville Jaguars (2026–present)
- * Offseason or practice squad member only

Career NFL statistics as of 2024
- Total tackles: 38
- Sacks: 1
- Fumble recoveries: 1
- Pass deflections: 2
- Stats at Pro Football Reference

Kaevon Merriweather (born December 20, 1999) is an American professional football safety for the Jacksonville Jaguars of the National Football League (NFL). He played college football for the Iowa Hawkeyes and was signed by the Tampa Bay Buccaneers as an undrafted free agent after the 2023 NFL draft.

== Early life ==
Merriweather attended Romulus Senior High School in Romulus, Michigan before transferring to Belleville High School in Belleville, Michigan for his senior year. He starred in basketball in high school, receiving several offers to play basketball before committing to playing football in high school. He committed to the University of Iowa to play college football after being recruited by Iowa defensive coordinator and longtime defensive backs coach Phil Parker.

== College career ==
Merriweather played in nine games as a true freshman at Iowa in 2018, and took a redshirt in 2019 after playing in two games in 2019. In 2020, he started five of nine games, recording 23 tackles. In 2021, he started seven of 14 games and had 42 tackles and an interception as part of a nationally elite defense. Merriweather returned to Iowa as a starter in 2022. He was named a first-team All-American by CBS Sports.

== Professional career ==
Pre-draft measurables
Height	Weight	Arm length	Hand span	Wingspan	40-yard dash	10-yard split	20-yard split	20-yard shuttle	Three-cone drill	Vertical jump	Broad jump	Bench press
6 ft 0 in (1.83 m)	205 lb (93 kg)	31 7/8 in (0.81 m)	9 1/4 in (0.23 m)	6 ft 5 1/8 in (1.96 m)	4.62 s	1.58 s	2.57 s	4.24 s	7.14 s	35.5 in (0.90 m)	9 ft 10 in (3.00 m)	17 reps
All values from NFL Combine/Pro Day

=== Tampa Bay Buccaneers ===
Merriweather was signed by the Tampa Bay Buccaneers as an undrafted free agent on May 12, 2023. On August 29, the Buccaneers announced that he had made the initial 53-man roster.

On November 18, 2024, Merriweather was waived by the Buccaneers.

=== Detroit Lions ===
On November 20, 2024, Merriweather signed with the Detroit Lions' practice squad.

=== Tampa Bay Buccaneers (second stint) ===
On December 3, 2024, Merriweather was signed by the Tampa Bay Buccaneers off of the Lions' practice squad. In 14 total appearances (five starts) for Tampa Bay, he compiled one pass deflection, one fumble recovery, one sack, and 17 combined tackles.

Merriweather played in 12 games for Tampa Bay in 2025, recording eight combined tackles. He was waived by the Buccaneers on December 17, 2025.

=== Houston Texans ===
On December 23, 2025, Merriweather signed with the practice squad of the Houston Texans. On January 20, 2026, he signed a reserve/futures contract with Houston. Merriweather was waived by Houston during final roster cuts on August 30.

=== Jacksonville Jaguars ===
On September 1, 2026, Merriweather was signed to the Jacksonville Jaguars' practice squad. On October 13, Merriweather was signed to the active roster.
