= 2022 Wisconsin Badgers football team =

American college football season

2022 Wisconsin Badgers football

Guaranteed Rate Bowl champion

Guaranteed Rate Bowl, W 24–17 vs. Oklahoma State
- Conference: Big Ten Conference
- West Division
- Record: 7–6 (4–5 Big Ten)
- Head coach: Paul Chryst (8th season; first 5 games); Jim Leonhard (interim; games 6 to 12); Luke Fickell (interim; bowl game)
- Offensive coordinator: Bobby Engram (1st season)
- Offensive scheme: Pro-style
- Defensive coordinator: Jim Leonhard (6th season)
- Base defense: 3–4
- MVP: Nick Herbig
- Home stadium: Camp Randall Stadium

Uniform
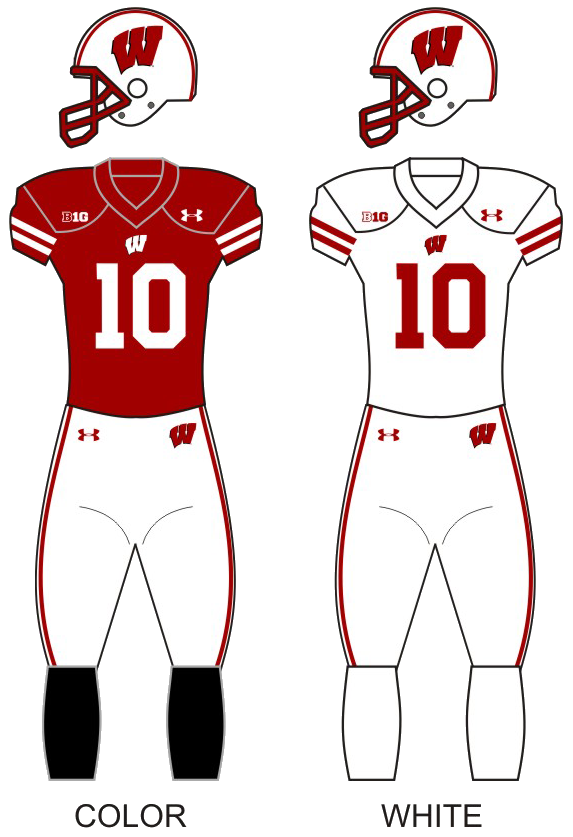

2022 Big Ten Conference football standings
	Conf.			Overall
Team	W		L	W		L
East Division
No. 3 Michigan xy$^	9	–	0	13	–	1
No. 4 Ohio State ^	8	–	1	11	–	2
No. 7 Penn State	7	–	2	11	–	2
Maryland	4	–	5	8	–	5
Indiana	2	–	7	4	–	8
Rutgers	1	–	8	4	–	8
Michigan State†	0	–	6	0	–	7
West Division
Purdue xy	6	–	3	8	–	6
Illinois	5	–	4	8	–	5
Iowa	5	–	4	8	–	5
Minnesota	5	–	4	9	–	4
Wisconsin	4	–	5	7	–	6
Nebraska	3	–	6	4	–	8
Northwestern	1	–	8	1	–	11
Championship: Michigan 43, Purdue 22
^ – College Football Playoff participant; $ – Conference champion; x – Division champion/co-champions; y – Championship game participant; † — NCAA vacated all wins for Michigan State (5–7, 3–6); Rankings from AP Poll

The 2022 Wisconsin Badgers football team represented the University of Wisconsin–Madison during the 2022 NCAA Division I FBS football season. The Badgers played their home games at Camp Randall Stadium in Madison, Wisconsin, and competed as members of the Big Ten Conference. They were led by head coach Paul Chryst, who was in his eighth season as head coach, until his dismissal on October 2. Defensive coordinator Jim Leonhard assumed interim head coaching duties after the dismissal of Chryst. The Badgers finished the season 7–6, 4–5 in Big Ten play to finish in fifth place in the West division. They received an invitation to the Guaranteed Rate Bowl where they defeated Oklahoma State.

On November 21, the school named Cincinnati coach Luke Fickell the team's new head coach.

== Offseason ==
=== 2022 NFL draft ===
Round	Pick	Player	Position	NFL Club
3	103	Leo Chenal	ILB	Kansas City Chiefs
3	104	Logan Bruss	OG	Los Angeles Rams
4	129	Jake Ferguson	TE	Dallas Cowboys
6	206	Matt Henningsen	DT	Denver Broncos
7	232	Faion Hicks	CB	Denver Broncos
Undrafted		Scott Nelson	DB	Seattle Seahawks
Undrafted		Josh Seltzner	OL	Indianapolis Colts
Undrafted		Caesar Williams	DB	Los Angeles Rams
Undrafted		Jack Sanborn	ILB	Chicago Bears
Undrafted		Danny Davis	WR	Green Bay Packers
Undrafted		Kendric Pryor	WR	Cincinnati Bengals

=== Transfers ===
Outgoing

Name	Number	Pos.	Height	Weight	Year	Hometown	Transfer to
Loyal Crawford	#22	RB	6'0	190	Freshman	Eau Claire, WI	Independence CC
Antwan Roberts	#28	RB	6'2	195	Freshman	Hendersonville, TN	Independence CC
Jalen Berger	#8	RB	6'0	205	Freshman (redshirt)	Ramsey, NJ	Michigan State
Devin Chandler	#86	WR	6'0	171	Freshman (redshirt)	Cornelius, NC	Virginia
Kayden Lyles	#76	OL	6'3	323	Senior (redshirt)	Middleton, WI	Florida State
Donte Burton	#4	CB	5'10	174	Junior (redshirt)	Loganville, GA	Tulsa
Quan Easterling	#43	FB	6'2	235	Sophomore (redshirt)	Akron, OH	Duquesne
Deron Harrell	#8	CB	6'2	175	Senior (redshirt)	Denver, CO	Wyoming
Izayah Green-May	#50	OLB	6'6	205	Senior (redshirt)	Bolingbrook, IL	Northern Illinois
AJ Abbott	#89	WR	6'2	196	Junior (redshirt)	Northville, MI	Western Michigan
Isaac Smith	#25	WR	6'2	199	Freshman (redshirt)	Memphis, TN	Eastern Michigan
Deacon Hill*	#10	QB	6'3	262	Freshman (redshirt)	Santa Barbara, CA	Iowa
Logan Brown*	#50	OL	6'6	310	Junior (redshirt)	Grand Rapids, MI	Kansas
Stephan Bracey*	#10	WR	5'10	182	Junior (redshirt)	Grand Rapids, MI	Central Michigan
Graham Mertz*	#5	QB	6'3	216	Junior (redshirt)	Overland Park, KS	Florida
Titus Toler*	#41	S	5'11	180	Junior (redshirt)	Bellflower, CA	Boise State
Tristan Monday*	#91	DE	6'4	274	Freshman	Scottsdale, AZ	Arizona State
Isaac Guerendo*	#20	RB	6'0	223	Senior (redshirt)	Clayton, IN	Louisville
Semar Melvin*	#20	CB	5'11	178	Junior (redshirt)	Pembroke Pines, FL	Michigan State
Jaylan Franklin*	#81	TE	6'4	243	Senior (redshirt)	Brownstown, MI	Michigan State

*Entered NCAA transfer portal midseason or prior to bowl game

Incoming

Name	Number	Pos.	Height	Weight	Year	Hometown	Prev. school
Vito Calvaruso	#91	K	6'2	200	Junior (redshirt)	Jefferson City, MO	Arkansas
Keontez Lewis	#3	WR	6'3	197	Sophomore	East Saint Louis, IL	UCLA
Justin Clark	#21	CB	5'11	165	Senior	West Bloomfield, MI	Toledo
Cedrick Dort Jr.	#5	CB	6'1	165	Senior (redshirt)	Palm Beach Gardens, FL	Kentucky
Jay Shaw	#1	CB	5'11	193	Senior (redshirt)	Corona, CA	UCLA
Bryce Carey	#37	S	6'1	180	Junior	Middleton, WI	Northern Illinois
Kamo'i Latu	#13	S	6'1	190	Freshman (redshirt)	Honolulu, HI	Utah

== Preseason ==
=== Preseason Big Ten poll ===
Although the Big Ten Conference has not held an official preseason poll since 2010, Cleveland.com has polled sports journalists representing all member schools as a de facto preseason media poll since 2011. For the 2022 poll, Wisconsin was projected to finish first in the West Division.

== Personnel ==
=== Coaching staff ===
Wisconsin football current coaching staff
Name	Position	Alma mater	Years at Wisconsin
Paul Chryst	Head Coach	Wisconsin–Madison	8th
Jim Leonhard	Defensive Coordinator / Safeties	Wisconsin–Madison	6th
Bobby Engram	Offensive Coordinator / quarterbacks	Penn State University	1st
Bobby April	Outside Linebackers / defensive run game coordinator	Louisiana at Lafayette	5th
Bob Bostad	Offensive Line / offensive run game coordinator	Wisconsin–Stevens Point	6th
Chris Haering	Tight ends	West Virginia University	8th
Al Johnson	Running backs	Wisconsin–Madison	1st
Ross Kolodziej	Defensive line	Wisconsin–Madison	2nd
Hank Poteat	Cornerbacks	University of Pittsburgh	2nd
Mark D'Onofrio	Inside Linebackers	Penn State University	1st
Alvis Whitted	Wide receivers	North Carolina State University	3rd
Shaun Snee	Director of Football Strength and Conditioning	California University of Pennsylvania	2nd
Keller Chryst	Graduate assistant	University of Tennessee	2nd

=== Roster ===
2022 Wisconsin Badgers football roster
Quarterback: 2 Chase Wolf – (redshirt) senior (6'1, 200); 5 Graham Mertz – (redshirt) junior (6'3, 216); 10 Deacon Hill – (redshirt) freshman (6'3, 262); 12 Marshall Howe – freshman (6'1, 187); 16 Myles Burkett – freshman (6'0, 204); Running back: 0 Braelon Allen – sophomore (6'2, 240); 6 Chez Mellusi – senior (5'11, 210); 20 Isaac Guerendo – (redshirt) senior (6'0, 223); 29 Brady Schipper – (redshirt) senior (5'11, 200); 32 Julius Davis – (redshirt) junior (5'10, 201); 43 Grover Bortolotti – (redshirt) freshman (5'9, 192); Fullback: 34 Jackson Acker – (redshirt) freshman (6'1, 232); 37 Riley Nowakowski – sophomore (6'1, 237); 44 Zach Gloudeman – freshman (6'2, 218); 45 Garrison Solliday – (redshirt) freshman (5'11, 229); Wide receiver: 3 Keontez Lewis – sophomore (6'2, 194); 4 Markus Allen – (redshirt) freshman (6'1, 211); 6 Dean Engram – (redshirt) junior (5'9, 169); 10 Stephan Bracey – (redshirt) junior (5'10, 182); 11 Skyler Bell – (redshirt) freshman (6'0, 190); 13 Chimere Dike – junior (6'1, 194); 15 Tommy McIntosh – freshman (6'5, 203); 21 Cam Fane – freshman (6'1, 175); 22 Vinny Anthony – freshman (6'1, 170); 24 Cole Toennies – freshman (6'2, 186); 27 Haakon Anderson – (redshirt) sophomore (6'1, 209); 28 Mike Gregoire – (redshirt) senior (5'10, 186); 30 Alex Moeller – (redshirt) freshman (5'11, 174); 84 Christopher Brooks Jr. – freshman (6'2, 215); Tight end: 41 JT Seagreaves – freshman (6'6, 225); 48 Cole Dakovich – (redshirt) sophomore (6'5, 260); 49 Cam Large – (redshirt) sophomore (6'3, 234); 81 Jaylan Franklin – (redshirt) senior (6'4, 240); 82 Jack Eschenbach – (redshirt) senior (6'6, 239); 85 Clay Cundiff – (redshirt) junior (6'3, 236); 87 Hayden Rucci – (redshirt) junior (6'4, 259); 89 Jack Pugh – (redshirt) freshman (6'5, 233)	Offensive lineman: 50 Logan Brown – (redshirt) junior (6'6, 310); 56 Joe Brunner – freshman (6'6, 300); 61 Dylan Barrett – (redshirt) sophomore (6'5, 318); 62 Travis Alvin – freshman (6'5, 260); 63 Tanor Bortolini – (redshirt) sophomore (6'4, 306); 64 Sean Timmis – (redshirt) sophomore (6'4, 300); 65 Tyler Beach – (redshirt) senior (6'6, 316); 66 Nolan Rucci – (redshirt) freshman (6'8, 292); 67 JP Benzschawel – (redshirt) freshman (6'6, 297); 70 Barrett Nelson – freshman (6'6, 277); 71 Riley Mahlman – (redshirt) freshman (6'8, 312); 73 Kerry Kodanko – (redshirt) sophomore (6'2, 303); 74 Michael Furtney – (redshirt) senior (6'5, 315); 75 Joe Tippmann – (redshirt) junior (6'6, 317); 76 John Clifford – freshman (6'5, 273); 77 Drew Evans – freshman (6'4, 275); 78 Trey Wedig – (redshirt) sophomore (6'7, 310); 79 Jack Nelson – (redshirt) sophomore (6'7, 303); Defensive lineman: 56 Rodas Johnson – DE – (redshirt) junior (6'2, 291); 68 Ben Barten – DE – (redshirt) sophomore (6'5, 304); 76 Tommy Brunner – DE – (redshirt) junior (6'3, 253); 90 James Thompson Jr. – DE – (redshirt) sophomore (6'5, 290); 91 Tristan Monday – DE – freshman (6'4, 274); 92 Curtis Neal – NT – freshman (6'0, 288); 93 Isaac Townsend – DE – (redshirt) junior (6'5, 280); 94 Gio Paez – DE – (redshirt) junior (6'3, 319); 95 Keeanu Benton – NT – senior (6'4, 316); 96 Cade McDonald – DE – (redshirt) sophomore (6'6, 280); 97 Mike Jarvis – DE – (redshirt) freshman (6'4, 290); 99 Isaiah Mullens – DE – (redshirt) senior (6'4, 300); Isaac Hamm – freshman (6'5, 260); Long snappers: 47 Peter Bowden – (redshirt) junior (6'2, 230); 64 Duncan McKinley – sophomore (6'2, 224); 69 Zach Zei – (redshirt) freshman (6'2, 217); Kicker: 22 Jack Van Dyke – junior (6'5, 214); 29 Nate Van Zelst – (redshirt) freshman (5'11, 188); 91 Vito Calvaruso – (redshirt) junior (6'3, 198); 96 Gavin Lahm – freshman (6'0, 225); Punter: 28 Gavin Meyers – (redshirt) sophomore (6'1, 194); 38 Andy Vujnovich – senior (6'3, 234)	Linebacker: 3 T.J. Bollers – OLB – (redshirt) freshman (6'2, 251); 7 Spencer Lytle – ILB – (redshirt) junior (6'2, 231); 17 Darryl Peterson – OLB – (redshirt) freshman (6'1, 242); 19 Nick Herbig – OLB – junior (6'2, 227); 25 Jake Ratzlaff – ILB – (redshirt) freshman (6'2, 220); 32 Marty Strey – OLB – (redshirt) senior (6'2, 226); 36 Jake Chaney – ILB – sophomore (5'11, 225); 39 Tatum Grass – ILB – (redshirt) junior (6'2, 234); 50 Aidan Vaughan – ILB – freshman (6'2, 207); 51 Bryan Sanborn – ILB – (redshirt) freshman (6'1, 233); 52 Kaden Johnson – OLB – (redshirt) sophomore (6'2, 235); 53 Ross Gengler – OLB – (redshirt) sophomore (6'2, 226); 54 Jordan Turner – ILB – (redshirt) sophomore (6'1, 224); 55 Maema Njongmeta – ILB – (redshirt) junior (6'0, 224); 57 Luna Larson – ILB – freshman (6'2, 216); 59 Aaron Witt – OLB – (redshirt) sophomore (6'6, 254); 98 C.J. Goetz – OLB – (redshirt) senior (6'3, 232); Defensive back: 1 Jay Shaw – CB – (redshirt) senior (5'11, 188); 2 Ricardo Hallman – CB – (redshirt) freshman (5'10, 177); 4 A'Khoury Lyde – CB – freshman (5'9, 184); 5 Cedrick Dort Jr. – CB – (redshirt) senior (5'11, 183); 8 Avyonne Jones – CB – freshman (5'11, 180); 9 Austin Brown – S – freshman (6'1, 204); 11 Alexander Smith – CB – (redshirt) senior (5'11, 179); 12 Max Lofy – CB – (redshirt) sophomore (5'10, 180); 13 Kamo'i Latu – S – junior (6'0, 195); 14 Preston Zachman – S – (redshirt) sophomore (6'1, 211); 15 John Torchio – S – (redshirt) senior (6'1, 210); 18 Owen Arnett – S – (redshirt) freshman (5'11, 215); 20 Semar Melvin – CB – (redshirt) junior (5'11, 172); 21 Justin Clark – CB – senior (5'11, 178); 24 Hunter Wohler – S – sophomore (6'2, 206); 25 Cade Yacamelli – S – freshman (6'0, 195); 26 Travian Blaylock – S – (redshirt) senior (5'11, 205); 27 Al Ashford – CB – (redshirt) freshman (6'0, 181); 30 Jackson Trudgeon – S – freshman (6'1, 196); 31 Amaun Williams – CB – (redshirt) sophomore (5'10, 180); 34 Charlie Jarvis – S – freshman (6'1, 198); 37 Bryce Carey – S – junior (6'1, 183); 38 Lee Hutton – CB – freshman (5'10, 176); 41 Titus Toler – S – (redshirt) junior (5'11, 195); 46 Deven Magli – S – freshman (6'1, 192)

== Schedule ==
Wisconsin's 2022 schedule included seven home games and five away games. The Badgers hosted Big Ten foes Illinois, Purdue, Maryland, and Minnesota and traveled to Ohio State, Northwestern, Michigan State, Iowa, Nebraska.

The Badgers hosted all three non-conference opponents Illinois State from Division I FCS, Washington State from the Pac-12 and New Mexico State from the FBS Independents.

Date	Time	Opponent	Rank	Site	TV	Result	Attendance
September 3	6:00 p.m.	Illinois State*	No. 18	Camp Randall Stadium; Madison, WI	FS1	W 38–0	73,727
September 10	2:30 p.m.	Washington State*	No. 19	Camp Randall Stadium; Madison, WI	FOX	L 14–17	74,001
September 17	2:30 p.m.	New Mexico State*		Camp Randall Stadium; Madison, WI	BTN	W 66–7	73,080
September 24	6:30 p.m.	at No. 3 Ohio State		Ohio Stadium; Columbus, OH	ABC	L 21–52	105,473
October 1	11:00 a.m.	Illinois		Camp Randall Stadium; Madison, WI	BTN	L 10–34	73,502
October 8	2:30 p.m.	at Northwestern		Ryan Field; Evanston, IL	BTN	W 42–7	32,121
October 15	3:00 p.m.	at Michigan State		Spartan Stadium; East Lansing, MI	FOX	L 28–34 ^{2OT}	72,526
October 22	2:30 p.m.	Purdue^{†}		Camp Randall Stadium; Madison, WI	ESPN	W 35–24	75,018
November 5	11:00 a.m.	Maryland		Camp Randall Stadium; Madison, WI	BTN	W 23–10	74,057
November 12	2:30 p.m.	at Iowa		Kinnick Stadium; Iowa City, IA (Heartland Trophy)	FS1	L 10–24	69,250
November 19	11:00 a.m.	at Nebraska		Memorial Stadium; Lincoln, NE (Freedom Trophy)	ESPN	W 15–14	86,068
November 26	2:30 p.m.	Minnesota		Camp Randall Stadium; Madison, WI (Paul Bunyan's Axe)	ESPN	L 16–23	75,728
December 27	9:15 p.m.	vs. Oklahoma State*		Chase Field; Phoenix, AZ (Guaranteed Rate Bowl)	ESPN	W 24–17	23,187
*Non-conference game; ^{†}Homecoming; Rankings from AP Poll released prior to the game; All times are in Central time

== Game summaries ==
=== Illinois State ===
Illinois State vs. Wisconsin – Game summary

Quarter	1	2	3	4	Total
Redbirds	0	0	0	0	0
No. 18 Badgers	7	10	14	7	38

at Camp Randall Stadium, Madison, Wisconsin

- Date: September 3, 2022
- Game time: 6:10 p.m.
- Game weather: 70 °F (21 °C); Cloudy; Wind at NE10 MPH
- Game attendance: 73,727
- Referee: Larry Smith
- TV announcers (FS1): Tim Brando (play-by-play) and Spencer Tillman (analyst)

Game information

First quarter

- WIS – John Torchio 100-yard interception return (Vito Calvaruso kick), 1:52 Wisconsin 7–0

Second quarter

- WIS – Braelon Allen 96-yard run (Vito Calvaruso kick), 13:15 Wisconsin 14–0 Drive: 1 play, 96 yards, 0:44.
- WIS – Vito Calvaruso 28-yard field goal, 3:11. Wisconsin 17–0. Drive: 13 plays, 68 yards, 7:42.

Third quarter

- WIS – Braelon Allen 1-yard run (Vito Calvaruso kick), 9:36 Wisconsin 24–0 Drive: 9 plays, 59 yards, 5:18.
- WIS – Chimere Dike 16-yard pass from Graham Mertz (Vito Calvaruso kick), 2:55. Wisconsin 31–0. Drive: 4 plays, 93 yards, 1:50.

Fourth quarter

- WIS – Isaac Guerendo 1-yard run (Vito Calvaruso kick), 8:57 Wisconsin 38–0 Drive: 14 plays, 76 yards, 7:26.

Top passers

- ISU – Zack Annexstad – 16/24, 186 yards, 2 INT
- WIS – Graham Mertz – 14/16, 219 yards, TD

Top rushers

- ISU – Nigel White – 4 rushes, 22 yards
- WIS – Braelon Allen – 14 rushes, 148 yards, 2 TD

Top receivers

- ISU – Daniel Sobkowicz – 2 receptions, 41 yards
- WIS – Chimere Dike – 3 receptions, 106 yards, TD

Top defenders

- ISU – Zeke Vandenburgh – 10 tackles, TFL, sack
- WIS – John Torchio – 3 tackles, TFL, sack, INT, TD

=== Washington State ===
Washington State vs. Wisconsin – Game summary

Quarter	1	2	3	4	Total
Cougars	0	7	10	0	17
No. 19 Badgers	0	14	0	0	14

at Camp Randall Stadium, Madison, Wisconsin

- Date: September 10, 2022
- Game time: 2:30 p.m.
- Game weather: 68 °F (20 °C); Cloudy; Wind at N8 MPH
- Game attendance: 74,001
- Referee: Reggie Smith
- TV announcers (FOX): Jason Benetti (play-by-play), Brock Huard (analyst), and Allison Williams (sideline)

Game information

First quarter

No scoring

Second quarter

- WSU – Nakia Watson 2-yard run (Dean Janikowski kick), 9:10 Washington State 7–0 Drive: 4 plays, 53 yards, 1:19.
- WIS – Clay Cundiff 17-yard pass from Graham Mertz (Vito Calvaruso kick), 6:05. Tie 7–7. Drive: 6 plays, 65 yards, 3:05.
- WIS – Clay Cundiff 10-yard pass from Graham Mertz (Vito Calvaruso kick), 0:20. Wisconsin 14–7. Drive: 5 plays, 45 yards, 0:35.

Third quarter

- WSU – Dean Janikowski 26-yard field goal, 11:20. Wisconsin 14–10. Drive: 7 plays, 18 yards, 3:26.

Fourth quarter

- WSU – Nakia Watson 31-yard pass from Cameron Ward (Dean Janikowski kick), 5:12. Washington State 17–14. Drive: 6 plays, 49 yards, 2:22.

Top passers

- WSU – Cam Ward – 17/28, 200 yards, TD, 2 INT
- WIS – Graham Mertz – 18/31, 227 yards, 2 TD, INT

Top rushers

- WSU – Nakia Watson – 10 rushes, 33 yards, TD
- WIS – Braelon Allen – 21 rushes, 98 yards

Top receivers

- WSU – Renard Bell – 2 receptions, 49 yards
- WIS – Clay Cundiff – 4 receptions, 59 yards, 2 TD

Top defenders

- WSU – Daiyan Henley – 9 tackles, 1.5 TFL
- WIS – John Torchio – 8 tackles, pass breakup

=== New Mexico State ===
New Mexico State vs. Wisconsin – Game summary

Quarter	1	2	3	4	Total
Aggies	0	0	0	7	7
Badgers	7	28	21	10	66

at Camp Randall Stadium, Madison, Wisconsin

- Date: September 17, 2022
- Game time: 2:30 p.m.
- Game weather: 79 °F (26 °C); Cloudy; Wind at S14 MPH
- Game attendance: 73,080
- Referee: Kole Knueppel
- TV announcers (BTN): Brandon Gaudin (play-by-play), Joshua Perry (analyst), and Rick Pizzo (sideline)

Game information

First quarter

- WIS – Braelon Allen 39-yard run (Nate Van Zelst kick), 13:30 Wisconsin 7–0 Drive: 3 plays, 49 yards, 1:22.

Second quarter

- WIS – Chez Mellusi 2-yard run (Nate Van Zelst kick), 14:56 Wisconsin 14–0 Drive: 7 plays, 63 yards, 2:40.
- WIS – Keontez Lewis 18-yard pass from Graham Mertz (Nate Van Zelst kick), 12:22. Wisconsin 21–0. Drive: 4 plays, 56 yards, 1:37.
- WIS – Braelon Allen 1-yard run (Nate Van Zelst kick), 11:17 Wisconsin 28–0 Drive: 2 plays, 2 yards, 0:41.
- WIS – Braelon Allen 2-yard run (Nate Van Zelst kick), 6:09 Wisconsin 35–0 Drive: 5 plays, 63 yards, 2:33.

Third quarter

- WIS – Skyler Bell 49-yard pass from Graham Mertz (Nate Van Zelst kick), 10:21. Wisconsin 42–0. Drive: 5 plays, 82 yards, 2:10.
- WIS – Skyler Bell 18-yard pass from Graham Mertz (Nate Van Zelst kick), 6:53. Wisconsin 49–0. Drive: 4 plays, 48 yards, 1:50.
- WIS – Isaac Guerendo 3-yard run (Nate Van Zelst kick), 1:41 Wisconsin 56–0 Drive: 8 plays, 70 yards, 3:56.

Fourth quarter

- WIS – Isaac Guerendo 30-yard run (Nate Van Zelst kick), 11:48 Wisconsin 63–0 Drive: 3 plays, 37 yards, 1:28.
- NMS – Ahmonte Watkins 1-yard run (Nate Van Zelst kick), 8:10 Wisconsin 63–7 Drive: 7 plays, 75 yards, 3:38.
- WIS – Nate Van Zelst 27-yard field goal, 3:58. Wisconsin 66–7. Drive: 8 plays, 66 yards, 4:12.

Top passers

- NMS – Diego Pavia – 6/19, 52 yards, INT
- WIS – Graham Mertz – 12/15, 251 yards, 3 TD, INT

Top rushers

- NMS – Star Thomas – 9 rushes, 46 yards
- WIS – Braelon Allen – 15 rushes, 86 yards, 3 TD

Top receivers

- NMS – Jordin Parker – 1 reception, 36 yards
- WIS – Skyler Bell – 4 receptions, 108 yards, 2 TD

Top defenders

- NMS – Keyshaun Elliott – 7 tackles
- WIS – C.J. Goetz – 6 tackles, 1.5 TFL

=== No. 3 Ohio State ===
Wisconsin vs. No. 3 Ohio State – Game summary

Quarter	1	2	3	4	Total
Badgers	0	7	0	14	21
No. 3 Buckeyes	21	10	14	7	52

at Ohio Stadium, Columbus, Ohio

- Date: September 24, 2022
- Game time: 6:30 p.m.
- Game weather: 66 °F (19 °C) • Wind: N at 11 miles per hour (18 km/h) • Weather: Clear
- Game attendance: 105,473
- Referee: Jerry McGinn
- TV announcers (ABC): Chris Fowler (play-by-play), Kirk Herbstreit (analyst), and Holly Rowe (sideline)

Game information

First quarter

- OSU – Miyan Williams 2-yard run (Noah Ruggles Kick), 12:13 Ohio State 7–0, Drive: 6 plays, 88 yards, 2:47
- OSU – Cade Stover 13-yard pass from C. J. Stroud (Noah Ruggles Kick), 8:54 Ohio State 14–0, Drive: 2 plays, 16 yards, 0:41
- OSU – Cade Stover 2-yard pass C. J. Stroud (Noah Ruggles Kick), 3:55 Ohio State 21–0, Drive: 7 plays, 70 yards, 3:24

Second quarter

- OSU – Miyan Williams 3-yard run (Noah Ruggles Kick), 13:33 Ohio State 28–0, Drive: 8 plays, 67 yards, 3:21
- WIS – Graham Mertz 1-yard run (Nate Van Zelst Kick), 8:31 Ohio State 28–7, Drive: 10 plays, 72 yards, 5:02
- OSU – Noah Ruggles 25-yard field goal 2:20, Ohio State 31–7, Drive: 3 plays, 68 yards, 6:11

Third quarter

- OSU – Julian Fleming 12-yard pass from C. J. Stroud (Noah Ruggles Kick), 9:35 Ohio State 38–7, Drive: 8 plays, 72 yards, 3:38
- OSU – Emeka Egbuka 8-yard pass from C. J. Stroud (Noah Ruggles Kick), 2:22 Ohio State 45–7, Drive: 4 plays, 38 yards, 2:02

Fourth quarter

- WIS – Jackson Acker 2-yard pass from Graham Mertz (Nate Van Zelst Kick), 9:46 Ohio State 45–14, Drive: 14 plays, 80 yards, 7:36
- OSU – Emeka Egbuka 32-yard pass from C. J. Stroud (Noah Ruggles Kick), 7:21 Ohio State 52–14, Drive: 5 plays, 75 yards, 2:25
- WIS – Braelon Allen 75-yard run (Nate Van Zelst Kick), 7:11 Ohio State 52–21, Drive: 1 play, 75 yards, 0:10

Top passers

- OSU – C. J. Stroud – 17/27, 281 yards, 5 TD, INT
- WIS – Graham Mertz – 11/20, 94 yards TD, INT

Top rushers

- OSU – TreVeyon Henderson – 21 carries, 121 yards
- WIS – Braelon Allen – 24 carries, 165 yards, TD

Top receivers

- OSU – Emeka Egbuka – 6 receptions, 118 yards, 2 TD
- WIS – Skyler Bell – 4 receptions, 55 yards

Top defenders

- OSU – Tommy Eichenberg – 14 tackles, 2 TFL
- WIS – John Torchio – 7 tackles, INT

=== Illinois ===
Illinois vs. Wisconsin – Game summary

Quarter	1	2	3	4	Total
Fighting Illini	7	7	17	3	34
Badgers	7	3	0	0	10

at Camp Randall Stadium, Madison, Wisconsin

- Date: October 1, 2022
- Game time: 11:00 a.m.
- Game weather: 58 °F (14 °C) • Wind: NE at 5 miles per hour (8.0 km/h) • Weather: Sunny
- Game attendance: 73,502
- Referee: Jerry Servinski
- TV announcers (BTN): Lisa Byington (play-by-play), Anthony Herron (analyst), and Krystle Rich (sideline)

Game information

First quarter

- WIS – Isaac Guerendo 21-yard pass from Graham Mertz (Nate Van Zelst Kick), 11:15 Wisconsin 7–0, Drive: 7 plays, 53 yards, 3:39
- ILL – Tommy DeVito 1-yard run (Caleb Griffin Kick), 4:30 Tie 7–7, Drive: 7 plays, 16 yards, 3:39

Second quarter

- WIS – Nate Van Zelst 39-yard field goal, 14:53. Wisconsin 10–7. Drive: 10 plays, 45 yards, 4:32.
- ILL – Tommy DeVito 1-yard run (Caleb Griffin Kick), 7:31 Illinois 14–10, Drive: 6 plays, 47 yards, 2:48

Third quarter

- ILL – Tommy DeVito 1-yard run (Caleb Griffin Kick), 10:24 Illinois 21–10, Drive: 10 plays, 75 yards, 4:36
- ILL – Caleb Griffin 44-yard field goal, 9:03. Illinois 24–10. Drive: 4 plays, -10 yards, 1:18.
- ILL – Chase Brown 49-yard run (Caleb Griffin Kick), 6:42 Illinois 31–10, Drive: 4 plays, 70 yards, 1:14

Fourth quarter

- ILL – Caleb Griffin 31-yard field goal, 14:18. Illinois 34–10. Drive: 9 plays, 40 yards, 5:18.

Top passers

- ILL – Tommy DeVito – 18/24, 167 yards
- WIS – Graham Mertz – 17/32, 206 yards TD, 2 INT

Top rushers

- ILL – Chase Brown – 25 carries, 129 yards, TD
- WIS – Chez Mellusi – 7 carries, 16 yards

Top receivers

- ILL – Brian Hightower – 5 receptions, 59 yards
- WIS – Chimere Dike – 5 receptions, 76 yards

Top defenders

- ILL – Quan Martin – 7 tackles, TFL, sack, pass breakup
- WIS – Keeanu Benton – 3 tackles, 2 TFL, 2 sacks

=== Northwestern ===
Wisconsin vs. Northwestern – Game summary

Quarter	1	2	3	4	Total
Badgers	7	21	0	14	42
Wildcats	0	0	0	7	7

at Ryan Field, Evanston, Illinois

- Date: October 8, 2022
- Game time: 2:30 p.m.
- Game weather: 58 °F (14 °C) • Wind: W at 15 miles per hour (24 km/h) • Weather: Sunny
- Game attendance: 32,121
- Referee: Larry Smith
- TV announcers (BTN): Mark Followill (play-by-play), Brock Vereen (analyst), and Rick Pizzo (sideline)

Game information

First quarter

- WIS – Skyler Bell 15-yard pass from Graham Mertz (Nate Van Zelst Kick), 2:25 Wisconsin 7–0, Drive: 9 plays, 98 yards, 5:00

Second quarter

- WIS – Chimere Dike 52-yard pass from Graham Mertz (Nate Van Zelst Kick), 14:50 Wisconsin 14–0, Drive: 3 plays, 57 yards, 0:41
- WIS – Chimere Dike 21-yard pass from Graham Mertz (Nate Van Zelst Kick), 6:58 Wisconsin 21–0, Drive: 6 plays, 66 yards, 2:45
- WIS – Chez Mellusi 23-yard pass from Braelon Allen (Nate Van Zelst Kick), 2:11 Wisconsin 28–0, Drive: 7 plays, 61 yards, 3:11

Third quarter

No scoring

Fourth quarter

- WIS – Chimere Dike 6-yard pass from Graham Mertz (Nate Van Zelst Kick), 14:53 Wisconsin 35–0, Drive: 4 plays, 37 yards, 1:51
- NU – Anthony Tyus III 1-yard pass from Brendan Sullivan (Jack Olsen Kick), 11:08 Wisconsin 35–7, Drive: 8 plays, 78 yards, 3:43
- WIS – Markus Allen 19-yard pass from Graham Mertz (Nate Van Zelst Kick), 2:28 Wisconsin 42–7, Drive: 14 plays, 84 yards, 1:51

Top passers

- NU – Brendan Sullivan – 11/17, 114 yards, TD
- WIS – Graham Mertz – 20/29, 299 yards 5 TD

Top rushers

- NU – Brendan Sullivan – 10 carries, 33 yards
- WIS – Braelon Allen – 23 carries, 135 yards

Top receivers

- NU – Bryce Kirtz – 2 receptions, 66 yards
- WIS – Chimere Dike – 10 receptions, 185 yards, 3 TD

Top defenders

- NU – Garnett Hollis Jr. – 9 tackles, pass breakup
- WIS – Nick Herbig – 7 tackles, TFL, sack, forced fumble

=== Michigan State ===
Wisconsin vs. Michigan State – Game summary

Quarter	1	2	3	4	OT	2OT	Total
Badgers	7	7	0	7	7	0	28
Spartans	7	0	7	7	7	6	34

at Spartan Stadium, East Lansing, Michigan

- Date: October 15, 2022
- Game time: 3:00 p.m.
- Game weather: 50 °F (10 °C) • Wind: SW at 16 miles per hour (26 km/h) • Weather: Cloudy
- Game attendance: 72,526
- Referee: Mark Kluczynski
- TV announcers (FOX): Tim Brando (play-by-play) and Spencer Tillman (analyst)

Game information

First quarter

- WIS – Braelon Allen 1-yard run (Nate Van Zelst Kick), 8:01 Wisconsin 7–0, Drive: 11 plays, 63 yards, 5:27
- MSU – Jalen Berger 12-yard run (Ben Patton Kick), 0:20 Tied 7–7, Drive: 2 plays, 12 yards, 0:12

Second quarter

- WIS – Braelon Allen 1-yard run (Nate Van Zelst Kick), 10:21 Wisconsin 14–7, Drive: 9 plays, 75 yards, 4:59

Third quarter

- MSU – Elijah Collins 1-yard run (Ben Patton Kick), 0:54 Tied 14–14, Drive: 8 plays, 97 yards, 4:00

Fourth quarter

- MSU – Keon Coleman 27-yard pass from Payton Thorne (Ben Patton Kick), 7:23 Michigan State 21–14, Drive: 5 plays, 65 yards, 2:31
- WIS – Keontez Lewis 3-yard pass from Graham Mertz (Nate Van Zelst Kick), 2:04 Tied 21–21, Drive: 9 plays, 52 yards, 5:11

Overtime 1

- MSU – Keon Coleman 25-yard pass from Jayden Reed (Ben Patton Kick), 0:00 Michigan State 28–21, Drive: 1 plays, 25 yards, 0:00
- WIS – Chimere Dike 25-yard pass from Graham Mertz (Nate Van Zelst Kick), 0:00 Tied 28–28, Drive: 3 plays, 25 yards, 0:00

Overtime 2

- MSU – Jayden Reed 27-yard pass from Payton Thorne (), 0:00 Michigan State 34–28, Drive: 3 plays, 25 yards, 0:00

Top passers

- MSU – Payton Thorne – 21/28, 265 yards, 2 TD
- WIS – Graham Mertz – 14/24, 131 yards, 2 TD, INT

Top rushers

- MSU – Jalen Berger – 16 carries, 59 yards, TD
- WIS – Braelon Allen – 29 carries, 123 yards, 2 TD

Top receivers

- MSU – Jayden Reed – 9 receptions, 117 yards, TD
- WIS – Chimere Dike – 4 receptions, 45 yards, TD

Top defenders

- MSU – Jacoby Windmon – 11 tackles, 2 TFL, forced fumble, INT
- WIS – Kamo'i Latu – 13 tackles, TFL

=== Purdue ===
Purdue vs. Wisconsin – Game summary

Quarter	1	2	3	4	Total
Boilermakers	0	3	7	14	24
Badgers	21	0	14	0	35

at Camp Randall Stadium, Madison, Wisconsin

- Date: October 22, 2022
- Game time: 2:30 p.m.
- Game weather: 74 °F (23 °C) • Wind: S at 15 miles per hour (24 km/h) • Weather: Cloudy
- Game attendance: 75,018
- Referee: Ron Snodgrass
- TV announcers (ESPN): Bob Wischusen (play-by-play), Dan Orlovsky (analyst), and Kris Budden (sideline)

Game information

First quarter

- WIS – Skyler Bell 29-yard pass from Graham Mertz (Nate Van Zelst Kick), 12:34 Wisconsin 7–0, Drive: 6 plays, 76 yards, 2:26
- WIS – John Torchio 31-yard interception return (Nate Van Zelst Kick), 11:16 Wisconsin 14–0
- WIS – Chimere Dike 3-yard pass from Graham Mertz (Nate Van Zelst Kick), 2:38 Wisconsin 21–0, Drive: 8 plays, 80 yards, 3:59

Second quarter

- PUR – Mitchell Fineran 36-yard field goal, 3:49. Wisconsin 21–3. Drive: 13 plays, 71 yards, 5:14.

Third quarter

- WIS – Braelon Allen 14-yard run (Nate Van Zelst Kick), 14:08 Wisconsin 28–3, Drive: 2 plays, 14 yards, 0:12
- PUR – Payne Durham 8-yard pass from Aidan O'Connell (Mitchell Fineran Kick), 4:12 Wisconsin 28–10, Drive: 4 plays, 21 yards, 1:55
- WIS – Isaac Guerendo 54-yard run (Nate Van Zelst Kick), 2:42 Wisconsin 35–10, Drive: 4 plays, 75 yards, 1:30

Fourth quarter

- PUR – Devin Mockobee 1-yard run (Mitchell Fineran Kick), 12:05 Wisconsin 35–17, Drive: 12 plays, 81 yards, 2:55
- PUR – Aidan O'Connell 1-yard run (Mitchell Fineran Kick), 1:24 Wisconsin 35–24, Drive: 9 plays, 87 yards, 2:23

Top passers

- PUR – Aidan O'Connell – 31/46, 320 yards, TD, 3 INT
- WIS – Graham Mertz – 13/21, 203 yards, 2 TD

Top rushers

- PUR – Devin Mockobee – 23 carries, 108 yards, TD
- WIS – Braelon Allen – 16 carries, 113 yards, TD

Top receivers

- PUR – Charlie Jones – 10 receptions, 105 yards
- WIS – Skyler Bell – 4 receptions, 87 yards, TD

Top defenders

- PUR – Semisi Fakasiieiki – 7 tackles, TFL
- WIS – John Torchio – 10 tackles, 2 INT, pass breakup

=== Maryland ===
Maryland vs. Wisconsin – Game summary

Quarter	1	2	3	4	Total
Terrapins	0	0	3	7	10
Badgers	7	10	3	3	23

at Camp Randall Stadium, Madison, Wisconsin

- Date: November 5, 2022
- Game time: 11:00 a.m.
- Game weather: 60 °F (16 °C) • Wind: S at 20 miles per hour (32 km/h) • Weather: Rain
- Game attendance: 74,057
- Referee: Jerry McGinn
- TV announcers (BTN): Jeff Levering (play-by-play), Anthony Herron (analyst), and Meghan McKeown (sideline)

Game information

First quarter

- WIS – Braelon Allen 9-yard run (Nate Van Zelst Kick), 1:21 Wisconsin 7-0, Drive: 12 plays, 77 yards, 6:01

Second quarter

- WIS – Isaac Guerendo 89-yard run (Nate Van Zelst Kick), 10:16 Wisconsin 14-0, Drive: 1 play, 89 yards, 0:13
- WIS – Nate Van Zelst 38-yard field goal, 0:09 Wisconsin 17-0, Drive: 10 plays, 48 yards, 1:58

Third quarter

- MAR - Chad Ryland 39-yard field goal, 7:29 Wisconsin 17-3, Drive: 12 plays, 43 yards, 5:52
- WIS - Nate Van Zelst 35-yard field goal, 0:08 Wisconsin 20-3, 8 plays, 48 yards, 4:46

Fourth quarter

- WIS - Nate Van Zelst 28-yard field goal, 6:33 Wisconsin 23-3, 6 plays, 44 yards, 3:15
- MAR - Tai Felton 5-yard pass from Taulia Tagovailoa (Chad Ryland Kick), 0:57 Wisconsin 23-10, Drive: 13 plays, 73 yards, 5:31

Top passers

- MAR – Taulia Tagovailoa – 10/23, 77 yards, TD, INT
- WIS – Graham Mertz – 5/18, 77 yards

Top rushers

- MAR – Roman Hemby – 16 carries, 66 yards
- WIS – Braelon Allen – 23 carries, 119 yards, TD

Top receivers

- MAR – Tai Felton – 2 receptions, 18 yards, TD
- WIS – Chimere Dike – 3 receptions, 32 yards

Top defenders

- MAR – Beau Brade – 7 tackles
- WIS – Nick Herbig – 4 tackles, 3 TFL, 2 sacks, QB hurry, pass breakup

=== Iowa ===
Wisconsin vs. Iowa – Game summary

Quarter	1	2	3	4	Total
Badgers	3	7	0	0	10
Hawkeyes	0	14	0	10	24

at Kinnick Stadium, Iowa City, Iowa

- Date: November 12, 2022
- Game time: 2:40 p.m.
- Game weather: 33 °F (1 °C) • Wind: SE at 14 miles per hour (23 km/h) • Weather: Cloudy
- Game attendance: 69,250
- Referee: Michael Cannon
- TV announcers (FS1): Dan Hellie (play-by-play) and Petros Papadakis (analyst)

Game information

First quarter

- WIS – Nate Van Zelst 24-yard field goal, 4:14 Wisconsin 3-0, Drive: 10 plays, 37 yards, 5:01

Second quarter

- IOW – Kaleb Johnson 4-yard run (Drew Stevens Kick), 10:24 Iowa 7-3, Drive: 2 plays, 17 yards, 0:28
- IOW – Cooper DeJean 32-yard interception return (Drew Stevens Kick), 1:58 Iowa 14-3
- WIS – Keontez Lewis 51-yard pass from Graham Mertz (Nate Van Zelst Kick), 0:52 Iowa 14–10, Drive: 7 plays, 75 yards, 1:06

Third quarter

No scoring

Fourth quarter

- IOW – Spencer Petras 1-yard run (Drew Stevens Kick), 13:52 Iowa 21-10, Drive: 5 plays, 18 yards, 1:58
- IOW – Drew Stevens 44-yard field goal, 2:54 Wisconsin 24-10, Drive: 11 plays, 27 yards, 4:57

Top passers

- IOW – Spencer Petras – 14/23, 94 yards
- WIS – Graham Mertz – 16/35, 176 yards, TD, 2 INT

Top rushers

- IOW – Kaleb Johnson – 22 carries, 57 yards, TD
- WIS – Braelon Allen – 17 carries, 40 yards

Top receivers

- IOW – Sam LaPorta – 5 receptions, 48 yards
- WIS – Keontez Lewis – 3 receptions, 71 yards, TD

Top defenders

- IOW – Cooper DeJean – 10 tackles, TFL, INT, TD
- WIS – Nick Herbig – 8 tackles, 3 TFL, 3 sacks, forced fumble

=== Nebraska ===
Wisconsin vs. Nebraska – Game summary

Quarter	1	2	3	4	Total
Badgers	0	0	3	12	15
Cornhuskers	0	7	7	0	14

at Memorial Stadium, Lincoln, Nebraska

- Date: November 19, 2022
- Game time: 11:08 a.m.
- Game weather: 28 °F (−2 °C) • Wind: NW at 18 miles per hour (29 km/h) • Weather: Sunny
- Game attendance: 86,068
- Referee: Reggie Smith
- TV announcers (ESPN): Mark Jones (play-by-play), Robert Griffin III (analyst), and Quint Kessenich (sideline)

Game information

First quarter

No scoring

Second quarter

- NEB - Trey Palmer 11-yard pass from Casey Thompson (Timmy Bleekrode Kick), 6:40 Nebraska 7-0, Drive: 8 plays, 37 yards, 3:33

Third quarter

- WIS – Nate Van Zelst 25-yard field goal, 4:50 Nebraska 7-3, Drive: 14 plays, 74 yards, 7:34
- NEB - Trey Palmer 19-yard pass from Casey Thompson (Timmy Bleekrode Kick), 0:34 Nebraska 14-3, Drive: 9 plays, 79 yards, 4:11

Fourth quarter

- WIS – Skyler Bell 10-yard pass from Graham Mertz (Graham Mertz pass failed), 10:07 Nebraska 14–10, Drive: 7 plays, 75 yards, 1:06
- WIS – Graham Mertz 1-yard run (Graham Mertz run failed), 0:35 Wisconsin 15-14, Drive: 7 plays, 50 yards, 2:36

Top passers

- NEB – Casey Thompson – 12/20, 106 yards, 2 TD
- WIS – Graham Mertz – 8/18, 83 yards, TD, INT

Top rushers

- NEB – Casey Thompson – 11 carries, 33 yards
- WIS – Chez Mellusi – 21 carries, 98 yards

Top receivers

- NEB – Trey Palmer – 4 receptions, 47 yards, 2 TD
- WIS – Keontez Lewis – 3 receptions, 31 yards

Top defenders

- NEB – Ernest Hausmann – 12 tackles
- WIS – C.J. Goetz – 7 tackles, 2.5 TFL, pass breakup

=== Minnesota ===
Minnesota vs. Wisconsin – Game summary

Quarter	1	2	3	4	Total
Golden Gophers	7	3	3	10	23
Badgers	3	3	10	0	16

at Camp Randall Stadium, Madison, Wisconsin

- Date: November 26, 2022
- Game time: 2:34 p.m.
- Game weather: 51 °F (11 °C) • Wind: SW at 15 miles per hour (24 km/h) • Weather: Sunny
- Game attendance: 75,728
- Referee: Michael Cannon
- TV announcers (ESPN): Brian Custer (play-by-play), Dustin Fox (analyst), and Lauren Sisler (sideline)

Game information

First quarter

- WIS – Nate Van Zelst 40-yard field goal, 9:39 Wisconsin 3-0, Drive: 11 plays, 53 yards, 5:21
- MIN - Daniel Jackson 6-yard pass from Athan Kaliakmanis (Matthew Trickett Kick), 3:45 Minnesota 7-3, Drive: 10 plays, 81 yards, 5:49

Second quarter

- WIS – Nate Van Zelst 43-yard field goal, 8:51 Minnesota 7-6, Drive: 12 plays, 65 yards, 6:04
- MIN – Matthew Trickett 25-yard field goal, 0:00 Minnesota 10-6, Drive: 13 plays, 75 yards, 4:40

Third quarter

- MIN – Matthew Trickett 50-yard field goal, 10:59 Minnesota 13-6, Drive: 8 plays, 49 yards, 3:56
- WIS – Nate Van Zelst 36-yard field goal, 7:58 Minnesota 13-10, Drive: 9 plays, 57 yards, 3:01
- WIS – Chimere Dike 9-yard run (Nate Van Zelst kick), 3:14 Wisconsin 16-13, Drive: 6 plays, 54 yards, 3:07

Fourth quarter

- MIN – Matthew Trickett 27-yard field goal, 7:58 Tie 16-16, Drive: 9 plays, 69 yards, 3:03
- MIN - Le'Meke Brockington 45-yard pass from Athan Kaliakmanis (Matthew Trickett Kick), 3:40 Minnesota 23-16, Drive: 6 plays, 71 yards, 2:41

Top passers

- MIN – Athan Kaliakmanis – 19/29, 319 yards, 2 TD
- WIS – Graham Mertz – 16/27, 170 yards, INT

Top rushers

- MIN – Mohamed Ibrahim – 27 carries, 70 yards
- WIS – Chez Mellusi – 19 carries, 75 yards

Top receivers

- MIN – Brevyn Spann-Ford – 7 receptions, 95 yards
- WIS – Chimere Dike – 5 receptions, 52 yards

Top defenders

- MIN – Justin Walley – 4 tackles, INT
- WIS – Maema Njongmeta – 12 tackles, 2.5 TFL, 0.5 sack, QB hurry

=== Oklahoma State (2022 Guaranteed Rate Bowl) ===
2022 Guaranteed Rate Bowl

Quarter	1	2	3	4	Total
Wisconsin	3	14	7	0	24
Oklahoma State	7	0	0	10	17

at Chase Field • Phoenix, Arizona

- Date: Tuesday, December 27, 2022
- Game time: 9:25 p.m.
- Game weather: Indoors
- Game attendance: 23,187
- Referee: Chad Green
- TV announcers (ESPN/ESPN Radio): Beth Mowins (play-by-play), Kirk Morrison (analyst), and Stormy Buonantony (sideline)/Mike Couzens (play-by-play), Max Starks (analyst), and Kelsey Riggs (sideline)

Game information

First quarter

- WIS – Nate Van Zelst 47-yard field goal, 10:19 Wisconsin 3-0, Drive: 7 plays, 42 yards, 3:20
- OKS - Stephon Johnson Jr. 84-yard pass from Garret Rangel (Tanner Brown Kick), 5:56 Oklahoma State 7-3, Drive: 1 play, 84 yards, 0:17

Second quarter

- WIS – Chez Mellusi 1-yard run (Nate Van Zelst kick), 5:23 Wisconsin 10-7, Drive: 13 plays, 68 yards, 7:24
- WIS – Hayden Rucci 15-yard pass from Chase Wolf (Nate Van Zelst Kick), 0:44 Wisconsin 17–7, Drive: 8 plays, 65 yards, 4:16

Third quarter

- WIS – Braelon Allen 20-yard run (Nate Van Zelst kick), 6:42 Wisconsin 24-7, Drive: 2 plays, 32 yards, 0:44

Fourth quarter

- OKS – Ollie Gordon II 1-yard pass from Garret Rangel (Tanner Brown Kick), 12:47 Wisconsin 24–14, Drive: 10 plays, 80 yards, 3:56
- OKS – Tanner Brown 24-yard field goal, 5:08 Wisconsin 24-17, Drive: 13 plays, 69 yards, 6:06

Top passers

- OKS – Garret Rangel – 14/31, 229 yards, 2 TD, 2 INT
- WIS – Chase Wolf – 16/26, 116 yards, TD, INT

Top rushers

- OKS – Ollie Gordon II – 12 carries, 45 yards
- WIS – Braelon Allen – 22 carries, 116 yards, TD

Top receivers

- OKS – Stephon Johnson Jr. – 1 reception, 84 yards, TD
- WIS – Hayden Rucci – 2 receptions, 28 yards, TD

Top defenders

- OKS – Jason Taylor II – 12 tackles, 1.5 TFL
- WIS – Jordan Turner – 8 tackles, 1.5 TFL, QB hurry

== Rankings ==
Ranking movements Legend: ██ Increase in ranking ██ Decrease in ranking — = Not ranked RV = Received votes
	Week															
Poll	Pre	1	2	3	4	5	6	7	8	9	10	11	12	13	14	Final
AP	18	19	RV	RV	—	—	—	—	—	—	—	—	—	—	—	—
Coaches	20	18	RV	RV	—	—	—	—	—	—	—	—	—	—	—	—
CFP	Not released									—	—	—	—	—	—	Not released

== Awards and honors ==
Individual Awards
Player	Award	Ref.
Nick Herbig	First Team All-Big Ten Defense (Coaches/Media)	
John Torchio	First Team All-Big Ten Defense (Media)/Second Team All-Big Ten Defense (Coaches)	
Braelon Allen	Second Team All-Big Ten Offense (Coaches/Media)	
Keeanu Benton	Third Team All-Big Ten Defense (Coaches)/Honorable Mention Defense (Media)	
Maema Njongmeta	Third Team All-Big Ten Defense (Media)/Honorable Mention Defense (Coaches)	
Tanor Bortolini	Honorable Mention Offense (Coaches/Media)	
Jack Nelson	Honorable Mention Offense (Coaches/Media)	
Joe Tippmann	Honorable Mention Offense (Coaches/Media)	
Isaac Guerendo	Honorable Mention Special Teams (Coaches/Media)	
Chimere Dike	Honorable Mention Offense (Media)	
C.J. Goetz	Honorable Mention Defense (Media)	
Jordan Turner	Honorable Mention Defense (Media)	

== Players drafted into the NFL ==
Round	Pick	Player	Position	NFL Club
2	43	Joe Tippmann	C	New York Jets
2	49	Keeanu Benton	NT	Pittsburgh Steelers
4	132	Nick Herbig	OLB	Pittsburgh Steelers
