= 2021 Wisconsin Badgers football team =

American college football season

2021 Wisconsin Badgers football

Las Vegas Bowl champion

Las Vegas Bowl, W 20–13 vs. Arizona State
- Conference: Big Ten Conference
- West Division
- Record: 9–4 (6–3 Big Ten)
- Head coach: Paul Chryst (7th season)
- Offensive coordinator: Joe Rudolph (7th season)
- Offensive scheme: Pro-style
- Defensive coordinator: Jim Leonhard (5th season)
- Base defense: 3–4
- MVP: Leo Chenal
- Captains: Jake Ferguson; Faion Hicks; Jack Sanborn
- Home stadium: Camp Randall Stadium

Uniform
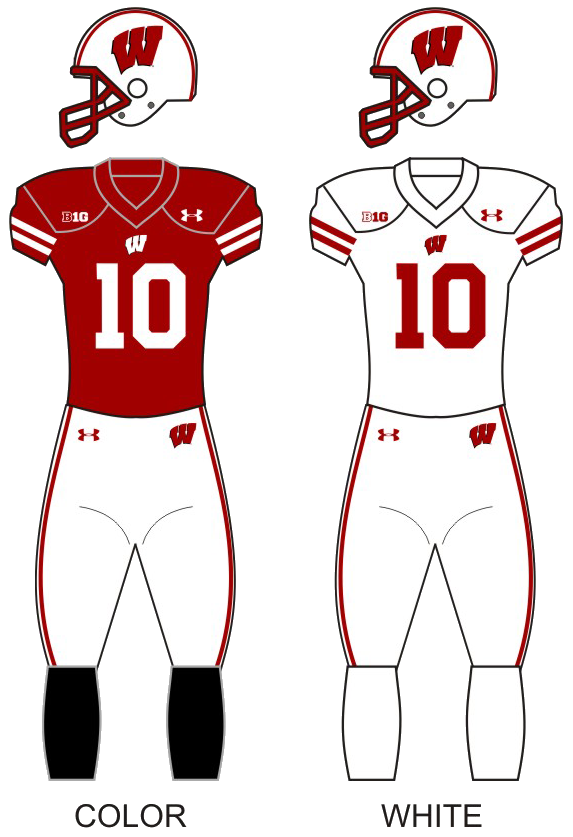

2021 Big Ten Conference football standings
	Conf.			Overall
Team	W		L	W		L
East Division
No. 3 Michigan xy$^	8	–	1	12	–	2
No. 6 Ohio State x	8	–	1	11	–	2
No. 9 Michigan State	7	–	2	11	–	2
Penn State	4	–	5	7	–	6
Maryland	3	–	6	7	–	6
Rutgers	2	–	7	5	–	8
Indiana	0	–	9	2	–	10
West Division
No. 23 Iowa xy	7	–	2	10	–	4
Minnesota	6	–	3	9	–	4
Wisconsin	6	–	3	9	–	4
Purdue	6	–	3	9	–	4
Illinois	4	–	5	5	–	7
Nebraska	1	–	8	3	–	9
Northwestern	1	–	8	3	–	9
Championship: Michigan 42, Iowa 3
^ – College Football Playoff participant; $ – Conference champion; x – Division champion/co-champions; y – Championship game participant; Rankings from AP Poll

The 2021 Wisconsin Badgers football team represented the University of Wisconsin–Madison in the 2021 NCAA Division I FBS football season. The Badgers were led by seventh-year head coach Paul Chryst and competed as members of the West Division of the Big Ten Conference. They played their home games at Camp Randall Stadium in Madison, Wisconsin.

== Offseason ==
=== 2021 NFL draft ===
Round	Pick	Player	Position	NFL Club
5	156	Isaiahh Loudermilk	DE	Pittsburgh Steelers
6	213	Rachad Wildgoose	CB	Buffalo Bills
6	214	Cole Van Lanen	OT	Green Bay Packers
Undrafted		Jon Dietzen	G	Green Bay Packers
Undrafted		Eric Burrell	S	New Orleans Saints
Undrafted		Mason Stokke	FB	Carolina Panthers
Undrafted		Garrett Groshek	RB	Las Vegas Raiders

=== Transfers ===
Outgoing

Name	Number	Pos.	Height	Weight	Year	Hometown	Transfer to
Reggie Pearson	#2	S	5'10	180	Sophomore (redshirt)	Inkster, MI	Texas Tech
Jack Coan	#17	QB	6'3	190	Senior	West Sayville, NY	Notre Dame
Nakia Watson	#14	RB	5'11	212	Sophomore (redshirt)	Austin, TX	Washington State
Gabe Lloyd	#46	TE	6'5	220	Senior (redshirt)	Green Bay, WI	North Dakota State
Madison Cone	#31	S	5'8	165	Senior	Kernersville, NC	Appalachian State
Dante Caputo	#38	S	5'11	185	Freshman (redshirt)	Wexford, PA	Pittsburgh
Malik Reed	#53	LB	6'2	220	Freshman	Chandler, AZ	Arizona
Taj Mustapha	#81	WR	6'2	175	Sophomore (redshirt)	West Bloomfield, MI	Kent State
Loyal Crawford*	#22	RB	6'0	190	Freshman	Eau Claire, WI	Independence CC
Antwan Roberts*	#28	RB	6'2	195	Freshman	Hendersonville, TN	Independence CC
Jalen Berger*	#8	RB	6'0	205	Freshman (redshirt)	Ramsey, NJ	Michigan State
Devin Chandler*	#86	WR	6'0	171	Freshman (redshirt)	Cornelius, NC	Virginia
Kayden Lyles*	#76	OL	6'3	323	Senior (redshirt)	Middleton, WI	Florida State
Donte Burton*	#4	CB	5'10	174	Junior (redshirt)	Loganville, GA	Tulsa
Quan Easterling*	#43	FB	6'2	235	Sophomore (redshirt)	Akron, OH	Duquesne
Deron Harrell*	#8	CB	6'2	175	Senior (redshirt)	Denver, CO	Wyoming
Izayah Green-May*	#50	OLB	6'6	205	Senior (redshirt)	Bolingbrook, IL	Northern Illinois

*Entered NCAA transfer portal midseason or prior to bowl

Incoming

Name	Number	Pos.	Height	Weight	Year	Hometown	Prev. school
Isaac Townsend	#85	DE	6'6	235	Freshman (redshirt)	Arvada, CO	Oregon
Chez Mellusi	#27	RB	5'11	190	Junior	Naples, FL	Clemson

== Preseason ==
=== Preseason Big Ten poll ===
Although the Big Ten Conference has not held an official preseason poll since 2010, Cleveland.com has polled sports journalists representing all member schools as a de facto preseason media poll since 2011. For the 2021 poll, Wisconsin was projected to finish first in the West Division.

== Schedule ==
Date	Time	Opponent	Rank	Site	TV	Result	Attendance
September 4	11:00 a.m.	No. 19 Penn State	No. 12	Camp Randall Stadium; Madison, WI (Big Noon Kickoff)	FOX	L 10–16	76,832
September 11	6:00 p.m.	Eastern Michigan*	No. 18	Camp Randall Stadium; Madison, WI	FS1	W 34–7	70,967
September 25	11:00 a.m.	vs. No. 12 Notre Dame*	No. 18	Soldier Field; Chicago, IL (Shamrock Series, Big Noon Kickoff, College GameDay)	FOX	L 13–41	59,571
October 2	11:00 a.m.	No. 14 Michigan		Camp Randall Stadium; Madison, WI (Big Noon Kickoff)	FOX	L 17–38	74,855
October 9	2:30 p.m.	at Illinois		Memorial Stadium; Champaign, IL	BTN	W 24–0	40,168
October 16	7:00 p.m.	Army*		Camp Randall Stadium; Madison, WI	BTN	W 20–14	76,314
October 23	2:00 p.m.	at No. 25 Purdue		Ross–Ade Stadium; West Lafayette, IN	BTN	W 30–13	61,320
October 30	11:00 a.m.	No. 9 Iowa^{†}		Camp Randall Stadium; Madison, WI (Heartland Trophy)	ESPN	W 27–7	74,209
November 6	2:30 p.m.	at Rutgers	No. 21	SHI Stadium; Piscataway, NJ	BTN	W 52–3	40,280
November 13	11:00 a.m.	Northwestern	No. 18	Camp Randall Stadium; Madison, WI	ESPN2	W 35–7	73,194
November 20	2:30 p.m.	Nebraska	No. 15	Camp Randall Stadium; Madison, WI (Freedom Trophy)	ABC	W 35–28	67,888
November 27	3:00 p.m.	at Minnesota	No. 14	Huntington Bank Stadium; Minneapolis, MN (Paul Bunyan's Axe)	FOX	L 13–23	49,736
December 30	9:30 p.m.	vs. Arizona State*		Allegiant Stadium; Paradise, NV (Las Vegas Bowl)	ESPN	W 20–13	32,515
*Non-conference game; ^{†}Homecoming; Rankings from AP Poll (and CFP Rankings, after November 2) - Released prior to game; All times are in Central time

== Personnel ==
=== Coaching staff ===
Wisconsin football 2021 coaching staff
Name	Position	Alma mater	Years at Wisconsin
Paul Chryst	Head coach	Wisconsin–Madison	7th
Jim Leonhard	Defensive coordinator / Safeties	Wisconsin–Madison	5th
Joe Rudolph	Associate head coach / run game coordinator / OL	Wisconsin–Madison	7th
Bobby April	Outside Linebackers / defensive run game coordinator	Louisiana at Lafayette	4th
Bob Bostad	Inside Linebackers	Wisconsin–Stevens Point	5th
Gary Brown	Running backs	Penn State University	1st
Chris Haering	Special Teams	West Virginia University	7th
Ross Kolodziej	Defensive line	Wisconsin–Madison	1st
Hank Poteat	Cornerbacks	University of Pittsburgh	1st
Mickey Turner	Tight ends	Wisconsin–Madison	7th
Alvis Whitted	Wide receivers	North Carolina State University	2nd
Shaun Snee	Director of Football Strength and Conditioning	California University of Pennsylvania	1st
Keller Chryst	Graduate assistant	University of Tennessee	1st

=== Roster ===
2021 Wisconsin Badgers football roster
Quarterback: 2 Chase Wolf – (redshirt) junior (6'1, 200); 5 Graham Mertz – (redshirt) sophomore (6'3, 227); 10 Deacon Hill – freshman (6'3, 248); 15 Danny Vanden Boom – (redshirt) senior (6'5, 207); Running back: 0 Braelon Allen – freshman (6'2, 238); 6 Chez Mellusi – junior (5'11, 204); 20 Isaac Guerendo – (redshirt) junior (6'0, 219); 29 Brady Schipper – (redshirt) junior (5'11, 205); 32 Julius Davis – (redshirt) sophomore (5'10, 201); 34 Jackson Acker – freshman (6'1, 229); 36 Grover Bortolotti – freshman (5'9, 188); Fullback: 44 John Chenal – senior (6'2, 256); Wide receiver: 3 Kendric Pryor – (redshirt) senior (5'11, 189); 4 Markus Allen – freshman (6'1, 215); 7 Danny Davis III – (redshirt) senior (6'1, 196); 10 Stephan Bracey – (redshirt) sophomore (5'10, 184); 11 Skyler Bell – freshman (6'0, 190); 13 Chimere Dike – sophomore (6'1, 199); 16 Jack Dunn – (redshirt) senior (5'7, 176); 25 Isaac Smith – (redshirt) freshman (6'2, 199); 27 Haakon Anderson – (redshirt) freshman (6'1, 209); 30 Alex Moeller – freshman (5'11, 166); 31 Jordan DiBenedetto – junior (6'1, 193); 39 Mike Gregoire – (redshirt) junior (5'10, 189); 89 A.J. Abbott – (redshirt) junior (6'2, 196); Tight end: 47 Jack Pugh – freshman (6'5, 241); 48 Cole Dakovich – (redshirt) freshman (6'5, 239); 49 Cam Large – (redshirt) freshman (6'3, 245); 81 Jaylan Franklin – (redshirt) junior (6'4, 240); 82 Jack Eschenbach – (redshirt) junior (6'6, 245); 84 Jake Ferguson – (redshirt) senior (6'5, 244); 85 Clay Cundiff – (redshirt) sophomore (6'3, 244); 87 Hayden Rucci – (redshirt) sophomore (6'4, 260)	Offensive lineman: 50 Logan Brown – (redshirt) sophomore (6'6, 311); 60 Logan Bruss – (redshirt) senior (6'5, 316); 61 Dylan Barrett – (redshirt) freshman (6'5, 303); 62 Cormac Sampson – (redshirt) junior (6'4, 305); 63 Tanor Bortolini – (redshirt) freshman (6'4, 306); 64 Sean Timmis – (redshirt) freshman (6'4, 306); 65 Tyler Beach – (redshirt) senior (6'6, 312); 66 Nolan Rucci – freshman (6'8, 294); 67 JP Benzschawel – freshman (6'6, 302); 68 Ben Barten – (redshirt) freshman (6'5, 303); 70 Josh Seltzner – (redshirt) senior (6'4, 310); 71 Riley Mahlman – freshman (6'8, 300); 73 Kerry Kodanko – (redshirt) freshman (6'2, 301); 74 Michael Furtney – (redshirt) junior (6'5, 312); 75 Joe Tippmann – (redshirt) sophomore (6'6, 320); 77 Blake Smithback – (redshirt) senior (6'2, 304); 78 Trey Wedig – (redshirt) freshman (6'7, 315); 79 Jack Nelson – (redshirt) freshman (6'7, 304); Defensive lineman: 56 Rodas Johnson – DE – (redshirt) sophomore (6'2, 286); 75 Michael Balistreri – DE – (redshirt) senior (6'4, 278); 76 Tommy Brunner – DE – (redshirt) sophomore (6'3, 254); 90 James Thompson Jr. – DE – (redshirt) freshman (6'5, 290); 91 Bryson Williams – DT – senior (6'2, 291); 92 Matt Henningsen – DE – (redshirt) senior (6'3, 291); 93 Isaac Townsend – DE – (redshirt) sophomore (6'5, 275); 94 Gio Paez – DE – (redshirt) sophomore (6'3, 310); 95 Keeanu Benton – DT – junior (6'4, 317); 96 Cade McDonald – DE – (redshirt) freshman (6'6, 278); 97 Mike Jarvis – DE – freshman (6'4, 274); 99 Isaiah Mullens – DE – (redshirt) junior (6'4, 297); Long snappers: 47 Peter Bowden – (redshirt) sophomore (6'2, 230); 64 Duncan McKinley – freshman (6'2, 222); 69 Zach Zei – freshman (6'2, 214); Kicker: 19 Collin Larsh – (redshirt) senior (5'10, 194); 22 Jack Van Dyke – sophomore (6'5, 215); 28 Gavin Meyers – (redshirt) freshman (6'1, 189); 29 Nate Van Zelst – freshman (5'11, 190); Punter: 38 Andy Vujnovich – senior (6'3, 230); 96 Conor Schlichting – (redshirt) senior (6'2, 237)	Linebacker: 3 T.J. Bollers – OLB – freshman (6'2, 258); 5 Leo Chenal – ILB – junior (6'2, 261); 7 Spencer Lytle – OLB – (redshirt) sophomore (6'2, 230); 17 Darryl Peterson – OLB – freshman (6'1, 247); 19 Nick Herbig – OLB – sophomore (6'2, 227); 25 Jake Ratzlaff – ILB – freshman (6'2, 206); 32 Marty Strey – OLB – (redshirt) junior (6'2, 234); 34 Ross Gengler – ILB – (redshirt) freshman (6'2, 225); 36 Jake Chaney – ILB – freshman (5'11, 222); 37 Riley Nowakowski – OLB – (redshirt) freshman (6'1, 244); 39 Tatum Grass – ILB – (redshirt) sophomore (6'2, 231); 41 Noah Burks – OLB – (redshirt) senior (6'2, 245); 45 Garrison Solliday – ILB – freshman (5'11, 230); 46 Ayo Adebogun – OLB – freshman (6'2, 214); 50 Izayah Green-May – OLB – (redshirt) senior (6'6, 234); 51 Bryan Sanborn – ILB – freshman (6'1, 229); 52 Kaden Johnson – OLB – (redshirt) freshman (6'2, 233); 54 Jordan Turner – ILB – (redshirt) freshman (6'1, 228); 55 Maema Njongmeta – ILB – (redshirt) sophomore (6'0, 227); 57 Jack Sanborn – ILB – (redshirt) senior (6'2, 236); 58 Mike Maskalunas – ILB – (redshirt) junior (6'3, 239); 59 Aaron Witt – OLB – sophomore (6'6, 249); 98 C.J. Goetz – OLB – (redshirt) junior (6'3, 243); Defensive back: 1 Faion Hicks – CB – (redshirt) senior (5'10, 192); 2 Ricardo Hallman – CB – freshman (5'10, 173); 6 Dean Engram – CB – (redshirt) sophomore (5'9, 168); 9 Scott Nelson – S – (redshirt) senior (6'2, 205); 11 Alexander Smith – CB – (redshirt) junior (5'11, 176); 12 Max Lofy – CB – (redshirt) freshman (5'10, 181); 14 Preston Zachman – S – (redshirt) freshman (6'1, 211); 15 John Torchio – S – (redshirt) junior (6'1, 208); 16 Amaun Williams – CB – (redshirt) freshman (5'10, 182); 18 Collin Wilder – S – (redshirt) senior (5'10, 199); 20 Semar Melvin – CB – (redshirt) sophomore (5'11, 170); 21 Caesar Williams – CB – (redshirt) senior (6'0, 188); 24 Hunter Wohler – S – freshman (6'2, 201); 26 Travian Blaylock – S – (redshirt) junior (5'11, 205); 27 Al Ashford – CB – freshman (6'0, 175); 30 Tyler Mais – S – (redshirt) senior (6'1, 201); 48 Owen Arnett – S – freshman (5'11, 215)

== Rankings ==
Ranking movements Legend: ██ Increase in ranking ██ Decrease in ranking — = Not ranked RV = Received votes
	Week															
Poll	Pre	1	2	3	4	5	6	7	8	9	10	11	12	13	14	Final
AP	12	18	18	18	RV	—	—	—	—	RV	20	19	18	RV	RV	RV
Coaches	15	17	17	15	RV	—	—	—	—	RV	24	20	18	RV	RV	RV
CFP	Not released									21	18	15	14	—	—	Not released

== Game summaries ==
=== No. 19 Penn State ===
Penn State vs. Wisconsin – Game summary

Quarter	1	2	3	4	Total
No. 19 Nittany Lions	0	0	7	9	16
No. 12 Badgers	0	0	7	3	10

at Camp Randall Stadium, Madison, Wisconsin

- Date: September 4, 2021
- Game time: 11:00 a.m.
- Game weather: 66 °F (19 °C); Cloudy; Wind at W6 MPH
- Game attendance: 76,832
- Referee: Jerry McGinn
- TV announcers (FOX): Gus Johnson (play-by-play), Joel Klatt (analyst) and Jenny Taft (sideline)

Game information

First quarter

No scoring

Second quarter

No scoring

Third quarter

- PSU – Jahan Dotson 49-yard TD pass from Sean Clifford, Jordan Stout kick, 12:08 (Penn State, 7–0)
- WISC – Chez Mellusi 3-yard TD run, Collin Larsh kick, 8:01 (Tied, 7–7)

Fourth quarter

- WISC – Colin Larsh 43-yard field goal, 13:36 (Wisconsin, 10–7)
- PSU – Jordan Stout 24-yard field goal, 11:26 (Tied, 10–10)
- PSU – Noah Cain 3-yard TD run, Stout kick missed, 9:17 (Penn State, 16–10)

Top passers

- PSU – Sean Clifford – 18/33, 247 yards, TD
- WISC – Graham Mertz – 22/37, 185 yards, 2 INT

Top rushers

- PSU – Noah Cain – 8 rushes, 48 yards, TD
- WISC – Chez Mellusi – 31 rushes, 121 yards, TD

Top receivers

- PSU – Jahan Dotson – 5 receptions, 102 yards, TD
- WISC – Danny Davis – 8 receptions, 99 yards

Top defenders

- PSU – Ellis Brooks – 11 tackles, TFL, sack
- WISC – Jack Sanborn – 5 tackles, 2 TFL, sack

=== Eastern Michigan ===
Eastern Michigan vs. Wisconsin – Game summary

Quarter	1	2	3	4	Total
Eagles	0	0	0	7	7
No. 18 Badgers	7	17	3	7	34

at Camp Randall Stadium, Madison, Wisconsin

- Date: September 11, 2021
- Game time: 6:00 p.m.
- Game weather: 82 °F (28 °C); Sunny; Wind at SW3 MPH
- Game attendance: 70,967
- Referee: Reggie Smith
- TV announcers (FS1): Dan Hellie (play-by-play) and Robert Smith (analyst)

Game information

First quarter

- WISC – Chez Mellusi 6-yard TD run, Collin Larsh kick, 4:39 (Wisconsin, 7–0)

Second quarter

- WISC – Collin Larsh 33-yard field goal, 13:39 (Wisconsin, 10–0)
- WISC – Jalen Berger 6-yard TD run, Collin Larsh kick, 7:02 (Wisconsin, 17–0)
- WISC – Isaac Guerendo 82-yard TD run, Collin Larsh kick, 4:40 (Wisconsin, 24–0)

Third quarter

- WISC – Larsh, 39-yard field goal, 8:02 (Wisconsin, 27–0)

Fourth quarter

- EMU – Chase Wolf pass intercepted for a TD, Chad Ryland kick, 9:38 (Wisconsin, 27–7)
- WISC – Braelon Allen 1-yard TD run, Collin Larsh kick, 4:16 (Wisconsin, 34–7)

Top passers

- EMU – Preston Hutchinson – 6/13, 53 yards, INT
- WISC – Graham Mertz – 14/17, 141 yards

Top rushers

- EMU – Preston Hutchinson – 3 rushes, 12 yards
- WISC – Chez Mellusi – 20 rushes, 144 yards, TD

Top receivers

- EMU – Zach Westmoreland – 2 receptions, 35 yards
- WISC – Kendric Pryor – 4 receptions, 54 yards

Top defenders

- EMU – Scott Woo – 3 tackles, 2 TFL, sack
- WISC – John Torchio – 3 tackles, TFL, 0.5 sack

=== No. 12 Notre Dame ===
Notre Dame vs. Wisconsin – Game summary

Quarter	1	2	3	4	Total
No. 12 Fighting Irish	0	10	0	31	41
No. 18 Badgers	3	0	7	3	13

at Soldier Field, Chicago, Illinois

- Date: September 25, 2021
- Game time: 11:00 a.m.
- Game weather: 82 °F (28 °C); Sunny; Wind at SW3 MPH
- Game attendance: 59,571
- Referee: Michael Cannon
- TV announcers (FOX): Gus Johnson (play-by-play), Joel Klatt (analyst) and Jenny Taft (sideline)

Game information

First quarter

- WISC – Collin Larsh 37-yard field goal, 11:48. Wisconsin 3–0. Drive: 5 plays, 26 yards, 1:54.

Second quarter

- ND – Jonathan Doerer 51-yard field goal, 8:44. Tied 3–3. Drive: 16 plays, 45 yards, 6:29.
- ND – Kevin Austin Jr. 36-yard pass from Jack Coan (Jonathan Doerer kick), 4:48. Notre Dame 10–3. Drive: 5 plays, 51 yards, 2:18.

Third quarter

- WISC – Kendric Pryor 8-yard pass from Graham Mertz (Collin Larsh kick), 9:53. Tied 10–10. Drive: 4 plays, 56 yards, 2:01.

Fourth quarter

- WISC – Collin Larsh 27-yard field goal, 14:14. Wisconsin 13–10. Drive: 9 plays, 30 yards, 3:44.
- ND – Chris Tyree 96-yard kickoff return (Jonathan Doerer kick), 14:01. Notre Dame 17–13.
- ND – Kevin Austin Jr. 16-yard pass from Drew Pyne (Jonathan Doerer kick), 9:34. Notre Dame 24–13. Drive: 6 plays, 46 yards, 2:40.
- ND – Jonathan Doerer 37-yard field goal, 3:20. Notre Dame 27–13. Drive: 4 plays, 4 yards, 1:45.
- ND – Jack Kiser 66-yard interception return (Jonathan Doerer kick), 2:13. Notre Dame 34–13.
- ND – Drew White 45-yard interception return (Jonathan Doerer kick), 1:01. Notre Dame 41–13.

Top passers

- ND – Jack Coan – 15/29, 158 yards, 1 TD
- WISC – Graham Mertz – 18/41, 240 yards, 1 TD, 4 INT

Top rushers

- ND – Kyren Williams – 18 rushes, 33 yards
- WISC – Chez Mellusi – 18 rushes, 54 yards

Top receivers

- ND – Kevin Austin Jr. – 6 receptions, 76 yards, 2 TD
- WISC – Kendric Pryor – 6 receptions, 69 yards, 1 TD

=== No. 14 Michigan ===
Michigan vs. Wisconsin – Game summary

Quarter	1	2	3	4	Total
No. 14 Wolverines	7	6	7	18	38
Badgers	0	10	0	7	17

at Camp Randall Stadium, Madison, Wisconsin

- Date: October 2, 2021
- Game time: 11:00 a.m.
- Game weather: 70 °F (21 °C); Sunny; Wind at S7 MPH
- Game attendance: 74,855
- Referee: John O'Neill
- TV announcers (FOX): Gus Johnson (play-by-play), Joel Klatt (analyst) and Jenny Taft (sideline)

Game information

First quarter

- MICH – Cornelius Johnson 34-yard pass from Cade McNamara (Jake Moody kick), 4:17. Michigan 7–0. Drive: 7 plays, 59 yards, 3:01.

Second quarter

- MICH – Jake Moody 26-yard field goal, 13:17. Michigan 10–0. Drive: 4 plays, -3 yards, 1:33.
- WISC – Collin Larsh 34-yard field goal, 2:32. Michigan 10–3. Drive: 15 plays, 78 yards, 7:04.
- MICH – Jake Moody 47-yard field goal, 0:27. Michigan 13–3. Drive: 9 plays, 36 yards, 2:05.
- WISC – Chimere Dike 18-yard pass from Graham Mertz (Collin Larsh kick), 0:07. Michigan 13–10. Drive: 3 plays, 63 yards, 0:20.

Third quarter

- MICH – J. J. McCarthy 1-yard TD run, (Jake Moody kick), 8:26. Michigan 20–10. Drive: 11 plays, 59 yards, 5:29.

Fourth quarter

- MICH – Jake Moody 48-yard field goal, 12:21. Michigan 23–10. Drive: 3 plays, 3 yards, 1:50.
- MICH – Cornelius Johnson 13-yard pass from Cade McNamara (Cade McNamara Pass to Cornelius Johnson for Two-Point Conversion), 9:34. Michigan 31–10. Drive: 5 plays, 35 yards, 2:39.
- MICH – Daylen Baldwin 56-yard pass from J. J. McCarthy (Jake Moody kick), 5:07. Michigan 38–10. Drive: 5 plays, 67 yards, 2:57.
- WISC – Cade Cundiff 25-yard pass from Chase Wolf (Collin Larsh kick), 0:32. Michigan 38–17. Drive: 3 plays, 43 yards, 1:05.

Top passers

- MICH – Cade McNamara – 17/28, 197 yards, 2 TD
- WISC – Graham Mertz – 8/15, 115 yards, TD

Top rushers

- MICH – Hassan Haskins – 19 rushes, 47 yards
- WISC – Braelon Allen – 5 rushes, 19 yards

Top receivers

- MICH – Cornelius Johnson – 2 receptions, 47 yards, 2 TD
- WISC – Chimere Dike – 2 receptions, 54 yards, TD

Top defenders

- MICH – David Ojabo – 7 tackles, 2.5 TFL, 2.5 sacks, forced fumble, QB hurry
- WISC – Jack Sanborn – 14 tackles

=== Illinois ===
Wisconsin vs Illinois – Game summary

Quarter	1	2	3	4	Total
Badgers	3	7	14	0	24
Fighting Illini	0	0	0	0	0

at Memorial Stadium, Champaign, Illinois

- Date: October 9, 2021
- Game time: 2:30 p.m.
- Game weather: 84 °F (29 °C); Sunny; Wind at n/a MPH
- Game attendance: 40,168
- Referee: Mark Kluczynski
- TV announcers (BTN): Mark Followill (play-by-play) and Matt Millen (analyst)

Game information

First quarter

- WISC – Collin Larsh 25-yard field goal, 4:14. Wisconsin 3–0. Drive: 18 plays, 67 yards, 9:44.

Second quarter

- WISC – John Chenal 1-yard TD run, (Collin Larsh kick), 5:27. Wisconsin 10–0. Drive: 14 plays, 79 yards, 6:50.

Third quarter

- WISC – Chez Mellusi 15-yard TD run, (Collin Larsh kick), 8:38. Wisconsin 17–0. Drive: 13 plays, 75 yards, 6:22.
- WISC – Braelon Allen 23-yard TD run, (Collin Larsh kick), 1:00. Wisconsin 24–0. Drive: 5 plays, 86 yards, 2:45.

Fourth quarter

No scoring

Top passers

- ILL – Artur Sitkowski – 8/27, 55 yards
- WISC – Graham Mertz – 10/19, 100 yards, INT

Top rushers

- ILL – Chase Brown – 8 rushes, 35 yards
- WISC – Chez Mellusi – 21 rushes, 145 yards, TD

Top receivers

- ILL – Isaiah Williams – 4 receptions, 23 yards
- WISC – Kendric Pryor – 2 receptions, 47 yards

Top defenders

- ILL – Tarique Barnes – 12 tackles, forced fumble, QB hurry, pass breakup
- WISC – Noah Burks – 6 tackles, 1.5 TFL, 0.5 sack, 3 QB hurries

=== Army ===
Army vs Wisconsin – Game summary

Quarter	1	2	3	4	Total
Black Knights	0	0	0	14	14
Badgers	0	13	0	7	20

at Camp Randall Stadium, Madison, Wisconsin

- Date: October 16, 2021
- Game time: 7:00 p.m.
- Game weather: 55 °F (13 °C); Sunny; Wind at W6 MPH
- Game attendance: 76,314
- Referee: Jerry McGinn
- TV announcers (BTN): Brandon Gaudin (play-by-play), James Laurinaitis (analyst) & Rick Pizzo (sideline)

Game information

First quarter

No scoring

Second quarter

- WISC – Braelon Allen 33-yard TD run, (Collin Larsh kick), 12:58. Wisconsin 7–0. Drive: 12 plays, 95 yards, 6:28.
- WISC – Graham Mertz 5-yard TD run, (Collin Larsh kick blocked), 3:22. Wisconsin 13–0. Drive: 10 plays, 81 yards, 6:14.

Third quarter

No scoring

Fourth quarter

- ARMY – Tyhier Tyler 5-yard TD run, (Cole Talley kick), 11:22. Wisconsin 13–7. Drive: 8 plays, 54 yards, 3:41.
- WISC – Graham Mertz 1-yard TD run, (Collin Larsh kick), 2:43. Wisconsin 20–7. Drive: 1 plays, 1 yards, 0:12.
- ARMY – A.J. Howard Jr. 6-yard TD run, (Cole Talley kick), 0:38. Wisconsin 20–14. Drive: 7 plays, 77 yards, 1:59.

Top passers

- ARMY – Jabari Laws – 5/6, 87 yards
- WISC – Graham Mertz – 8/15, 112 yards

Top rushers

- ARMY – Tyhier Tyler – 17 rushes, 90 yards, TD
- WISC – Braelon Allen – 16 rushes, 108 yards, TD

Top receivers

- ARMY – A.J. Howard Jr. – reception, 36 yards
- WISC – Jake Ferguson – 4 receptions, 58 yards

Top defenders

- ARMY – Marquel Broughton – 11 tackles, TFL, pass breakup
- WISC – Leo Chenal – 17 tackles, 2.5 TFL, sack, forced fumble

=== No. 25 Purdue ===
Wisconsin vs Purdue – Game summary

Quarter	1	2	3	4	Total
Badgers	7	6	7	10	30
No. 25 Boilermakers	0	13	0	0	13

at Ross–Ade Stadium, West Lafayette, Indiana

- Date: October 23, 2021
- Game time: 2:00 p.m.
- Game weather: Sunny
- Game attendance: 61,320
- Referee: Ron Snodgrass
- TV announcers (BTN): Brandon Gaudin (play-by-play) and Matt Millen (analyst)

Game information

First quarter

- WISC – Braelon Allen 4-yard TD run, (Collin Larsh kick), 2:49. Wisconsin 7–0. Drive: 13 plays, 92 yards, 7:37.

Second quarter

- PUR – Payne Durham 10-yard pass from Aidan O'Connell (Mitchell Fineran kick), 14:16. Tie 7–7. Drive: 4 plays, 39 yards, 1:47.
- WISC – Collin Larsh 37-yard field goal, 8:54. Wisconsin 10–7. Drive: 10 plays, 56 yards, 5:22.
- PUR – George Karlaftis 56-yard fumble return (Mitchell Fineran kick missed), 6:13. Purdue 13–10. Drive: 3 plays, -8 yards, 1:32.
- WISC – Collin Larsh 23-yard field goal, 2:06. Tie 13–13. Drive: 4 plays, -3 yards, 0:56.

Third quarter

- WISC – Chez Mellusi 20-yard TD run, (Collin Larsh kick), 6:06. Wisconsin 20–13. Drive: 3 plays, 94 yards, 1:01.

Fourth quarter

- WISC – Braelon Allen 14-yard TD run, (Collin Larsh kick), 10:13. Wisconsin 27–13. Drive: 6 plays, 72 yards, 2:55.
- WISC – Collin Larsh 43-yard field goal, 4:06. Wisconsin 30–13. Drive: 4 plays, -4 yards, 2:32.

Top passers

- PUR – Aidan O'Connell – 24/32, 200 yards, TD, 3 INT
- WISC – Graham Mertz – 5/8, 52 yards

Top rushers

- PUR – King Doerue – 9 rushes, 20 yards
- WISC – Chaz Mellusi – 27 rushes, 149 yards, TD

Top receivers

- PUR – Payne Durham – 9 receptions, 112 yards, TD
- WISC – Jake Ferguson – 2 receptions, 23 yards

Top defenders

- PUR – Jaylan Alexander – 15 tackles, TFL, forced fumble
- WISC – Leo Chenal – 9 tackles, 5.5 TFL, 3.5 sacks

=== No. 9 Iowa ===
Iowa vs Wisconsin – Game summary

Quarter	1	2	3	4	Total
No. 9 Hawkeyes	0	0	7	0	7
Badgers	7	13	0	7	27

at Camp Randall Stadium, Madison, Wisconsin

- Date: October 30, 2021
- Game time: 11:00 a.m.
- Game weather: 51 °F (11 °C); Cloudy; Wind at N 10 MPH
- Game attendance: 74,209
- Referee: Michael Cannon
- TV announcers (ESPN): Bob Wischusen (play-by-play), Dan Orlovsky (analyst), and Kris Budden (sideline)

Game information

First quarter

- WISC – Jake Ferguson 4-yard pass from Graham Mertz (Collin Larsh kick), 3:08. Wisconsin 7–0. Drive: 8 plays, 65 yards, 3:59.

Second quarter

- WISC – Collin Larsh 29-yard field goal, 12:18. Wisconsin 10–0. Drive: 7 plays, 45 yards, 3:23.
- WISC – Graham Mertz 1-yard TD run, (Collin Larsh kick), 7:40. Wisconsin 17–0. Drive: 1 plays, 1 yard, 0:04.
- WISC – Collin Larsh 32-yard field goal, 2:51. Wisconsin 20–0. Drive: 4 plays, 4 yards, 1:27.

Third quarter

- IOWA – Spencer Petras 1-yard TD run, (Caleb Shudak kick), 8:21. Wisconsin 20–7. Drive: 6 plays, 40 yard, 2:28.

Fourth quarter

- WISC – Graham Mertz 1-yard TD run, (Collin Larsh kick), 12:54. Wisconsin 27–7. Drive: 11 plays, 60 yard, 5:52.

Top passers

- IOWA – Spencer Petras – 9/19, 93 yards
- WISC – Graham Mertz – 11/22, 104 yards, TD

Top rushers

- IOWA – Tyler Goodson – 13 rushes, 27 yards
- WISC – Braelon Allen – 20 rushes, 104 yards

Top receivers

- IOWA – Sam LaPorta – 3 receptions, 44 yards
- WISC – Danny Davis III – 5 receptions, 59 yards

Top defenders

- IOWA – Jack Koerner – 11 tackles
- WISC – Nick Herbig – 6 tackles, 2.5 TFL, 2.5 sacks, forced fumble

=== Rutgers ===
Wisconsin vs Rutgers – Game summary

Quarter	1	2	3	4	Total
No. 21 Badgers	7	24	21	0	52
Scarlet Knights	3	0	0	0	3

at SHI Stadium, Piscataway, New Jersey

- Date: November 6, 2021
- Game time: 2:30 p.m.
- Game weather: 55 °F (13 °C); Cloudy; Wind at E 5 MPH
- Game attendance: 40,280
- Referee: Reggie Smith
- TV announcers (BTN): Brandon Gaudin (play-by-play) and James Laurinaitis (analyst)

Game information

First quarter

- WISC – Chez Mellusi 14-yard TD run, (Collin Larsh kick), 9:06. Wisconsin 7–0. Drive: 2 plays, 15 yards, 0:42.
- RUT – Valentino Ambrosio 24-yard field goal, 4:34. Wisconsin 7–3. Drive: 10 plays, 68 yards, 4:32.

Second quarter

- WISC – Collin Larsh 29-yard field goal, 8:04. Wisconsin 10–3. Drive: 11 plays, 60 yards, 5:19.
- WISC – John Chenal 1-yard pass from Graham Mertz (Collin Larsh kick), 5:18. Wisconsin 17–3. Drive: 5 plays, 29 yards, 2:37.
- WISC – Caesar Williams 29-yard interception return (Collin Larsh kick), 5:04. Wisconsin 24–3. Drive: 1 play, 29 yards, 0:12.
- WISC – Kendric Pryor 25-yard pass from Graham Mertz (Collin Larsh kick), 0:36. Wisconsin 31–3. Drive: 5 plays, 53 yards, 0:37.

Third quarter

- WISC – Braelon Allen 1-yard TD run, (Collin Larsh kick), 8:31. Wisconsin 38–3. Drive: 9 plays, 86 yards, 4:49.
- WISC – Danny Davis 72-yard pass from Graham Mertz (Collin Larsh kick), 6:44. Wisconsin 45–3. Drive: 1 play, 72 yards, 0:14.
- WISC – Jackson Acker 18-yard TD run, (Collin Larsh kick), 3:22. Wisconsin 52–3. Drive: 6 plays, 82 yards, 3:22.

Fourth quarter

No scoring

Top passers

- RUT – Noah Vedral – 8/16, 81 yards, 2 INT
- WISC – Graham Mertz – 11/16, 240 yards, 3 TD, INT

Top rushers

- RUT – Isiah Pacheco – 9 rushes, 55 yards
- WISC – Braelon Allen – 15 rushes, 130 yards, TD

Top receivers

- RUT – Bo Melton – 6 receptions, 61 yards
- WISC – Kendric Pryor – 4 receptions, 72 yards, TD

Top defenders

- RUT – Olakunle Fatukasi – 10 tackles
- WISC – Jack Sanborn – 9 tackles, TFL, sack

=== Northwestern ===
Northwestern vs Wisconsin – Game summary

Quarter	1	2	3	4	Total
Wildcats	0	0	0	7	7
No. 18 Badgers	0	21	14	0	35

at Camp Randall Stadium, Madison, Wisconsin

- Date: November 13, 2021
- Game time: 11:00 a.m.
- Game weather: 35 °F (2 °C); Cloudy; Wind at NW 11 MPH
- Game attendance: 73,194
- Referee: John O'Neill
- TV announcers (ESPN2): Clay Matvick (play-by-play) and Rocky Boiman (analyst)

Game information

First quarter

No scoring

Second quarter

- WISC – Braelon Allen 2-yard TD run, (Collin Larsh kick), 14:53. Wisconsin 7–0. Drive: 9 plays, 91 yards, 4:46.
- WISC – Danny Davis III 13-yard pass from Graham Mertz (Collin Larsh kick), 9:08. Wisconsin 14–0. Drive: 7 plays, 50 yards, 3:20.
- WISC – Braelon Allen 3-yard TD run, (Collin Larsh kick), 5:13. Wisconsin 21–0. Drive: 6 plays, 49 yards, 2:58.

Third quarter

- WISC – Jake Ferguson 11-yard pass from Graham Mertz (Collin Larsh kick), 3:26. Wisconsin 28–0. Drive: 3 plays, 14 yards, 1:18.
- WISC – Braelon Allen 33-yard TD run, (Collin Larsh kick), 0:43. Wisconsin 35–0. Drive: 2 plays, 39 yards, 0:49.

Fourth quarter

- NU – A.J. Hampton Jr. 49-yard fumble return (Charlie Kuhbander kick), 11:38. Wisconsin 35–7.

Top passers

- NU – Andrew Marty – 10/18, 100 yards, 3 INT
- WISC – Graham Mertz – 18/23, 216 yards, 2 TD, INT

Top rushers

- NU – Stephon Robinson Jr. – 2 rushes, 54 yards
- WISC – Braelon Allen – 25 rushes, 173 yards, 3 TD

Top receivers

- NU – Stephon Robinson Jr. – 8 receptions, 80 yards
- WISC – Jake Ferguson – 4 receptions, 43 yards, TD

Top defenders

- NU – Brandon Joseph – 7 tackles, 0.5 TFL, INT
- WISC – Leo Chenal – 14 tackles, 3 TFL, Sack, QB Hurry

=== Nebraska ===
Nebraska vs Wisconsin – Game summary

Quarter	1	2	3	4	Total
Cornhuskers	7	7	7	7	28
No. 15 Badgers	14	0	14	7	35

at Camp Randall Stadium, Madison, Wisconsin

- Date: November 20, 2021
- Game time: 2:30 p.m.
- Game weather: 47 °F (8 °C); Cloudy; Wind at W 7 MPH
- Game attendance: 67,888
- Referee: Jerry McGinn
- TV announcers (ABC): Dave Pasch (play-by-play), Dusty Dvoracek (analyst), Tom Luginbill (sideline)

Game information

First quarter

- WISC – Stephen Bracey 91-yard kickoff return (Collin Larsh kick), 14:47. Wisconsin 7–0.
- NEB – Markese Stepp 1-yard TD run, (Chase Contreraz kick), 12:41. Tie 7–7. Drive: 5 plays, 74 yard, 1:59.
- WISC – Braelon Allen, 71-yard TD run, (Collin Larsh kick), 1:59. Wisconsin 14–7. Drive: 3 plays, 80 yards, 1:23.

Second quarter

- NEB – Samori Toure 4-yard pass from Adrian Martinez (Chase Contreraz kick), 6:35. Tie 14–14. Drive: 8 plays, 33 yards, 3:02.

Third quarter

- WISC – Kendric Pryor 17-yard pass from Graham Mertz (Collin Larsh kick), 11:35. Wisconsin 21–14. Drive: 4 plays, 33 yards, 2:01.
- NEB – Adrian Martinez 1-yard TD run, (Chase Contreraz kick), 6:24. Tie 21–21. Drive: 11 plays, 75 yard, 5:11.
- WISC – Braelon Allen 3-yard TD run, (Collin Larsh kick), 1:30. Wisconsin 28–21. Drive: 8 plays, 75 yards, 4:54.

Fourth quarter

- NEB – Marvin Scott III 3-yard TD run, (Chase Contreraz kick), 6:27. Tie 28–28. Drive: 7 plays, 68 yard, 3:52.
- WISC – Braelon Allen 53-yard TD run, (Collin Larsh kick), 3:50. Wisconsin 35–28. Drive: 5 plays, 75 yards, 2:37.

Top passers

- NEB – Adrian Martinez – 23/35, 351 yards, TD, 2 INT
- WISC – Graham Mertz – 12/18, 145 yards, TD

Top rushers

- NEB – Marvin Scott III – 9 rushes, 29 yards, TD
- WISC – Braelon Allen – 22 rushes, 228 yards, 3 TD

Top receivers

- NEB – Austin Allen – 7 receptions, 143 yards
- WISC – Jake Ferguson – 8 receptions, 92 yards

Top defenders

- NEB – Garrett Nelson – 6 tackles, TFL, Sack, Pass breakup
- WISC – Leo Chenal – 11 tackles, 0.5 TFL, QB Hurry

=== Minnesota ===
Wisconsin vs Minnesota – Game summary

Quarter	1	2	3	4	Total
No. 14 Badgers	0	10	3	0	13
Golden Gophers	3	3	14	3	23

at Huntington Bank Stadium, Minneapolis, Minnesota

- Date: November 27, 2021
- Game time: 3:00 p.m.
- Game weather: 40 °F (4 °C); Sunny; Wind at NW 12 MPH
- Game attendance: 49,736
- Referee: Ron Snodgrass
- TV announcers (FOX): Tim Brando (play-by-play) and Spencer Tillman (analyst)

Game information

First quarter

- UMN – Matthew Trickett 28 yard field goal, 7:29. Minnesota 3–0. Drive: 14 plays, 65 yards, 7:31.

Second quarter

- WISC – Collin Larsh 25-yard field goal, 12:37. Tie 3–3. Drive: 15 plays, 85 yards, 9:52.
- WISC – Scott Nelson 25-yard interception return (Collin Larsh kick), 12:22. Wisconsin 10–3.
- UMN – Matthew Trickett 31-yard field goal, 8:19. Wisconsin 10–6. Drive: 10 plays, 53 yards, 4:03.

Third quarter

- UMN – Ky Thomas 2-yard TD run (Matthew Trickett kick), 13:24. Minnesota 13–10. Drive: 2 plays, 28 yards, 0:39.
- WISC – Collin Larsh 28-yard field goal, 6:35. Tie 13–13. Drive: 11 plays, 66 yards, 6:49.
- UMN – Chris Autman-Bell 27-yard pass from Tanner Morgan (Matthew Trickett kick), 1:56. Minnesota 20–13. Drive: 7 plays, 74 yards, 4:31.

Fourth quarter

- UMN – Matthew Trickett 36-yard field goal, 6:08. Minnesota 23–13. Drive: 9 plays, 52 yards, 5:36.

Top passers

- UMN – Tanner Morgan – 11/16, 199 yards, TD, INT
- WISC – Graham Mertz – 21/38, 171 yards, INT

Top rushers

- UMN – Ky Thomas – 18 rushes, 55 yards, TD
- WISC – Braelon Allen – 17 rushes, 55 yards

Top receivers

- UMN – Brevyn Spann-Ford – 3 receptions, 62 yards
- WISC – Danny Davis III – 5 receptions, 60 yards

Top defenders

- MIN – Jack Gibbens – 10 tackles, TFL
- WISC – Leo Chenal – 14 tackles, 1.5 TFL, 0.5 Sack

=== Arizona State ===
Wisconsin vs Arizona State – Game summary

Quarter	1	2	3	4	Total
Badgers	14	6	0	0	20
Sun Devils	3	3	7	0	13

at Allegiant Stadium, Paradise, Nevada

- Date: December 30, 2021
- Game time: 9:30 p.m.
- Game weather: Indoors
- Game attendance: 32,515
- Referee: David Smith
- TV announcers (ESPN): Beth Mowins (play-by-play), Kirk Morrison (analyst) and Dawn Davenport (sideline)

Game information

First quarter

- WISC – John Chenal 8-yard TD run, (Collin Larsh kick), 11:40. Wisconsin 7–0. Drive: 4 plays, 36 yards, 1:34.
- ASU – Cristian Zendejas 38 yard field goal, 4:21. Wisconsin 7–3. Drive: 14 plays, 55 yards, 7:19.
- WISC – Jake Ferguson 7-yard pass from Graham Mertz (Collin Larsh kick), 1:37. Wisconsin 14–3. Drive: 6 plays, 75 yards, 2:44.

Second quarter

- ASU – Cristian Zendejas 36 yard field goal, 11:13. Wisconsin 14–6. Drive: 7 plays, 17 yards, 2:46.
- WISC – Collin Larsh 48 yard field goal, 5:42. Wisconsin 17–6. Drive: 10 plays, 45 yards, 5:31.'
- WISC – Collin Larsh 35 yard field goal, 0:02. Wisconsin 20–6. Drive: 10 plays, 55 yards, 4:41.'

Third quarter

- ASU – Daniyel Ngata 3-yard TD run (Cristian Zendejas kick), 8:52. Wisconsin 20–13. Drive: 5 plays, 64 yards, 2:39.

Fourth quarter

No scoring

Top passers

- ASU – Jayden Daniels – 11/21, 159 yards, INT
- WISC – Graham Mertz – 11/15, 137 yards, TD, INT

Top rushers

- ASU – Jayden Daniels – 19 rushes, 40 yards
- WISC – Braelon Allen – 29 rushes, 159 yards

Top receivers

- ASU – Ricky Pearsall – 4 receptions, 65 yards
- WISC – Jake Ferguson – 3 receptions, 33 yards, TD

Top defenders

- ASU – Timarcus Davis – 9 tackles, 0.5 TFL, INT
- WISC – Nick Herbig – 7 tackles, 2.5 TFL, 2 Sacks, QB hurry

== Awards and honors ==
Weekly Awards
Player	Award	Date awarded	Ref.
Braelon Allen	Big Ten Freshman Player of the Week	October 18, 2021	
Leo Chenal	Walter Camp National FBS Players of the Week	October 24, 2021	
Leo Chenal	Big Ten Defensive Player of the Week	October 25, 2021	
Collin Larsh	Big Ten Special Teams Player of the Week	October 25, 2021	
Braelon Allen	Big Ten Freshman Player of the Week	November 8, 2021	
Braelon Allen	Big Ten Co-offensive Player of the Week	November 15, 2021	

Individual Awards
Player	Award	Ref.
Leo Chenal	Butkus/Fitzgerald Linebacker of the Year	
Leo Chenal	First Team All-Big Ten Defense (Coaches/Media)	
Josh Seltzner	First Team All-Big Ten Offense (Coaches)/Second Team All-Big Ten Offense (Media)	
Jack Sanborn	First Team All-Big Ten Defense (Coaches)/Second Team All-Big Ten Defense (Media)	
Jake Ferguson	First Team All-Big Ten Offense (Coaches)/Second Team All-Big Ten Offense (Media)	
Braelon Allen	Second Team All-Big Ten Offense (Coaches/Media)	
Logan Bruss	Second Team All-Big Ten Offense (Coaches/Media)	
Keeanu Benton	Second Team All-Big Ten Defense (Coaches)/Honorable Mention Defense (Media)	
Matt Henningsen	Third Team All-Big Ten Defense (Coaches/Media)	
Tyler Beach	Third Team All-Big Ten Offense (Coaches)/Honorable Mention Offense (Media)	
Caesar Williams	Third Team All-Big Ten Defense (Coaches)/Honorable Mention Defense (Media)	
Noah Burks	Honorable Mention Defense (Coaches/Media)	
Nick Herbig	Honorable Mention Defense (Coaches/Media)	
Faion Hicks	Honorable Mention Defense (Coaches/Media)	
Isiah Mullens	Honorable Mention Defense (Coaches/Media)	
Scott Nelson	Honorable Mention Defense (Coaches/Media)	
Collin Wilder	Honorable Mention Defense (Coaches/Media)	

== Players drafted into the NFL ==
Round	Pick	Player	Position	NFL Club
3	103	Leo Chenal	ILB	Kansas City Chiefs
3	104	Logan Bruss	OG	Los Angeles Rams
4	129	Jake Ferguson	TE	Dallas Cowboys
6	206	Matt Henningsen	DT	Denver Broncos
7	232	Faion Hicks	CB	Denver Broncos
