= 2022 Guaranteed Rate Bowl =

Postseason college football bowl game

- 33rd Guaranteed Rate Bowl
Wisconsin Badgers	Oklahoma State Cowboys
(6–6)	(7–5)
Big Ten	Big 12
24	17
Head coach: Luke Fickell	Head coach: Mike Gundy
	1	2	3	4	Total
Wisconsin	3	14	7	0	24
Oklahoma State	7	0	0	10	17
- Date: December 27, 2022
- Season: 2022
- Stadium: Chase Field
- Location: Phoenix, Arizona
- MVP: Offense: Braelon Allen (RB, Wisconsin) Defense: Jordan Turner (LB, Wisconsin)
- Favorite: Wisconsin by 4.5
- Referee: Matt Loeffler (SEC)
- Attendance: 23,187
- Payout: US$1,625,560

United States TV coverage
- Network: ESPN
- Announcers: Beth Mowins (play-by-play), Kirk Morrison (analyst), and Stormy Buonantony (sideline)

International TV coverage
- Network: ESPN Deportes

The 2022 Guaranteed Rate Bowl was a college football bowl game played on December 27, 2022, at Chase Field in Phoenix, Arizona. The 33rd annual Guaranteed Rate Bowl, the game featured Oklahoma State from the Big 12 Conference and Wisconsin from the Big Ten Conference. The game began at 8:25 p.m. MST and was aired on ESPN. It was one of the 2022–23 bowl games concluding the 2022 FBS football season. The game's title sponsor was residential mortgage company Guaranteed Rate.

== Teams ==
The bowl has conference tie-ins with the Big 12 and Big Ten, who supplied Oklahoma State and Wisconsin, respectively, for this game. This was the first time that the Badgers and Cowboys faced each other. Oklahoma State had twice appeared in this bowl (in December 2007 and January 2015) and Wisconsin once before (in December 1996). The teams had won each of their previous appearances in this bowl.

=== Oklahoma State ===
Oklahoma State finished their regular season with a 7–5 record, 4–5 in conference play. They opened the season with five consecutive wins, and were ranked as high as No. 7, but then lost five of their remaining seven games. The Cowboys faced four ranked opponents, defeating Baylor and Texas while losing to TCU and Kansas State.

=== Wisconsin ===
Wisconsin compiled a 6–6 regular-season record, going 4–5 in conference play. They faced one ranked opponent during the season, losing to Ohio State on September 24.

== Game summary ==
2022 Guaranteed Rate Bowl

Quarter	1	2	3	4	Total
Wisconsin	3	14	7	0	24
Oklahoma State	7	0	0	10	17

at Chase Field • Phoenix, Arizona

- Date: Tuesday, December 27, 2022
- Game time: 8:15 p.m. MST
- Game weather: None (retractable roof closed)
- Game attendance: 23,187
- Referee: Matt Loeffler
- TV announcers (ESPN): Beth Mowins (play-by-play), Kirk Morrison (analyst), and Stormy Buonantony (sideline)
- Box score

Scoring summary

Quarter	Time	Drive			Team	Scoring information	Score	
Quarter	Time	Plays	Yards	TOP	Team	Scoring information	Wisconsin	Oklahoma State
1	10:19	7	42	3:20	WIS	47-yard field goal by Nate Van Zelst	3	0
1	5:56	1	84	0:17	OSU	Stephon Johnson Jr. 84-yard touchdown reception from Garret Rangel, Tanner Brown kick good	3	7
2	5:23	13	68	7:24	WIS	Chez Mellusi 1-yard touchdown run, Nate Van Zelst kick good	10	7
2	0:44	8	65	4:16	WIS	Hayden Rucci 15-yard touchdown reception from Chase Wolf, Nate Van Zelst kick good	17	7
3	6:42	2	32	0:44	WIS	Braelon Allen 20-yard touchdown run, Nate Van Zelst kick good	24	7
4	12:57	10	80	3:56	OSU	Ollie Gordon 1-yard touchdown reception from Garret Rangel, Tanner Brown kick good	24	14
4	5:08	13	69	6:06	OSU	24-yard field goal by Tanner Brown	24	17
"TOP" = time of possession. For other American football terms, see Glossary of American football.							24	17

== Statistics ==
Team statistical comparison
Statistic	Wisconsin	Oklahoma State
First downs	21	11
First downs rushing	13	3
First downs passing	6	7
First downs penalty	2	1
Third down efficiency	4–14	3–14
Fourth down efficiency	2–2	1–1
Total plays–net yards	73–374	57–281
Rushing attempts–net yards	47–258	26–52
Yards per rush	5.5	2.0
Yards passing	116	229
Pass completions–attempts	16–26	14–31
Interceptions thrown	1	2
Punt returns–total yards	2–27	0–0
Kickoff returns–total yards	4–127	2–29
Punts–average yardage	7–46.7	9–45.1
Fumbles–lost	1–1	0–0
Penalties–yards	2–20	3–35
Time of possession	37:58	22:02

Wisconsin statistics
Badgers passing
	C–A	Yds	TD–INT
Chase Wolf	16–26	116	1–1
Badgers rushing
	Car	Yds	TD
Braelon Allen	22	116	1
Chez Mellusi	16	77	1
Skyler Bell	1	44	0
Chimere Dike	2	16	0
Andy Vujnovich	1	13	0
Julius Davis	2	8	0
Chase Wolf	3	-16	0
Badgers receiving
	Rec	Yds	TD
Chimere Dike	3	36	0
Hayden Rucci	2	28	1
Keontez Lewis	3	26	0
Jack Eschenbach	2	14	0
Skyler Bell	1	5	0
Julius Davis	1	3	0
J. T. Seagreaves	1	3	0
Brady Schipper	1	1	0
Braelon Allen	2	0	0

Oklahoma State statistics
Cowboys passing
	C–A	Yds	TD–INT
Garret Rangel	14–31	229	2–2
Cowboys rushing
	Car	Yds	TD
Ollie Gordon	12	45	0
Deondre Jackson	5	8	0
Jaden Nixon	2	6	0
Garret Rangel	6	-3	0
Brennan Presley	1	-4	0
Cowboys receiving
	Rec	Yds	TD
Stephon Johnson Jr.	1	84	1
Brennan Presley	6	74	0
Rashod Owens	1	41	0
John Paul Richardson	2	21	0
Talyn Shettron	1	10	0
Ollie Gordon	1	1	1
Braydon Johnson	1	-1	0
Jaden Nixon	1	-1	0
