= Keeanu Benton =

American football player (born 2001)

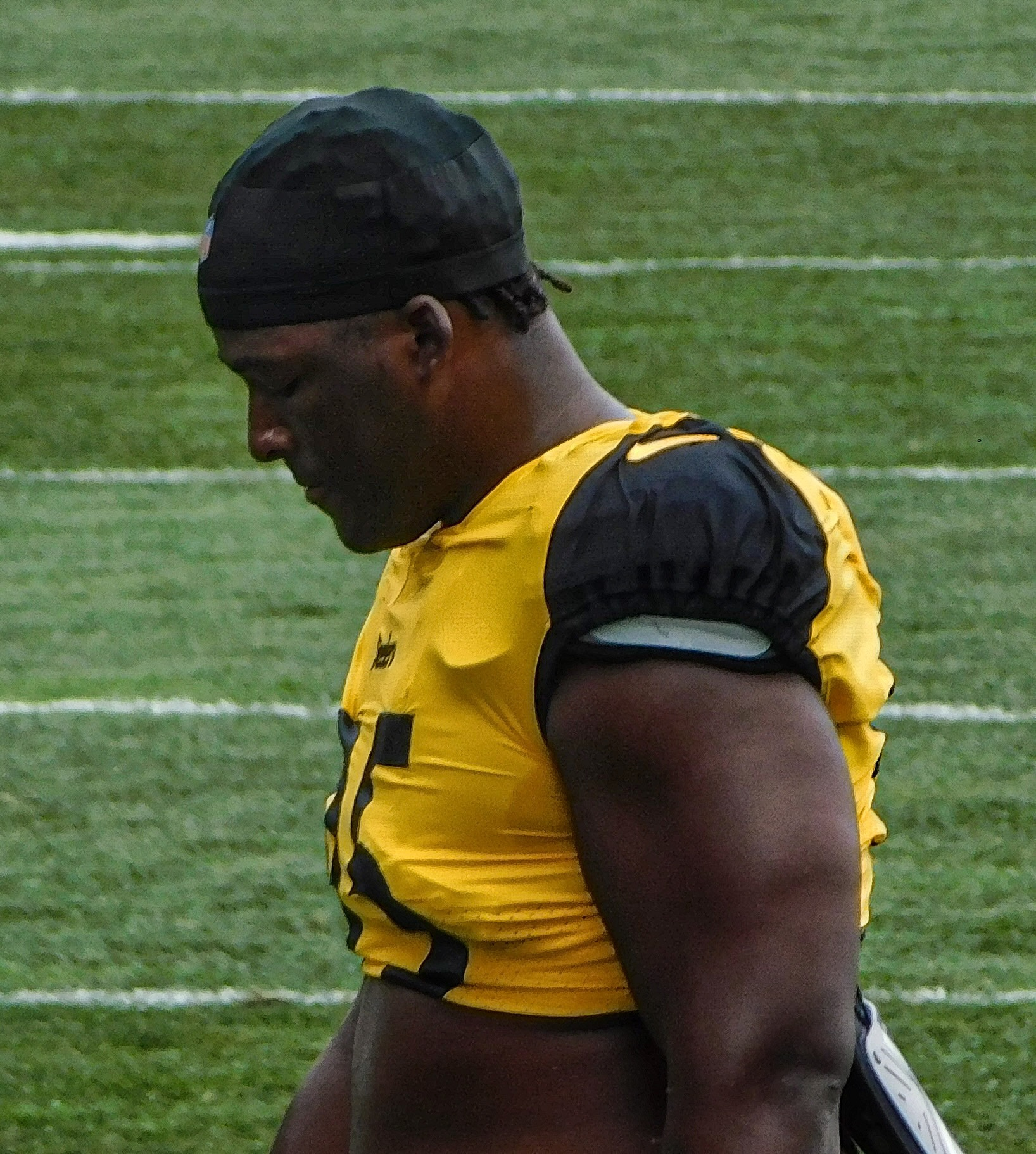
- Benton with the Pittsburgh Steelers in 2025

No. 95 – Pittsburgh Steelers
- Position: Nose tackle
- Roster status: Active

Personal information
- Born: July 17, 2001 (age 25); Chicago, Illinois, U.S.
- Listed height: 6 ft 4 in (1.93 m)
- Listed weight: 309 lb (140 kg)

Career information
- High school: Joseph A. Craig (Janesville, Wisconsin)
- College: Wisconsin (2019–2022)
- NFL draft: 2023: 2nd round, 49th overall pick

Career history
- Pittsburgh Steelers (2023–present)

Awards and highlights
- Second-team All-Big Ten (2021); Third-team All-Big Ten (2022)

Career NFL statistics as of 2025
- Total tackles: 123
- Sacks: 7.5
- Forced fumbles: 3
- Fumble recoveries: 1
- Pass deflections: 9
- Interceptions: 1
- Stats at Pro Football Reference

Keeanu Kyrie Benton (born July 17, 2001) is an American professional football nose tackle for the Pittsburgh Steelers of the National Football League (NFL). He played college football for the Wisconsin Badgers.

== Early life ==
Benton grew up in Janesville, Wisconsin and attended Joseph A. Craig High School, where he competed in football and wrestling. As a senior, he made 75 tackles, seven tackles for loss, two sacks, and one fumble recovery. Benton committed to play college football at Wisconsin over an offer from Iowa.

== College career ==
Benton played college football at Wisconsin from 2019 to 2022. He played in 13 games and made six starts at nose tackle as a freshman and finished the season with 12 tackles, four tackles for loss, and two sacks. He played in seven games and made seven starts at nose tackle during his sophomore season. He was named second team All-Big Ten Conference as a junior after making 25 tackles with five tackles for loss, 2.5 sacks, and two forced fumbles. He was named Third-Team All-Big Ten in 2022.

=== Statistics ===
Season	Team	GP	Tackles				Interceptions					Fumbles	
Season	Team	GP	Cmb	Solo	Ast	Sck	Int	Yds	Avg	TD	PD	FF	FR
2019	Wisconsin	8	12	8	4	2.0	0	0	0.0	0	0	0	0
2020	Wisconsin	7	9	5	4	0.0	0	0	0.0	0	0	2	0
2021	Wisconsin	12	24	11	13	2.5	0	0	0.0	0	2	0	2
2022	Wisconsin	12	36	20	16	4.5	0	0	0.0	0	2	0	0
Career		39	81	44	37	9.0	0	0	0	1	4	2	2

== Professional career ==
Pre-draft measurables
Height	Weight	Arm length	Hand span	Wingspan	40-yard dash	10-yard split	20-yard split	20-yard shuttle	Three-cone drill	Vertical jump	Broad jump	Bench press
6 ft 3 3/4 in (1.92 m)	309 lb (140 kg)	33 7/8 in (0.86 m)	9 3/4 in (0.25 m)	6 ft 9 1/2 in (2.07 m)	5.08 s	1.79 s	2.95 s	4.65 s	7.34 s	29.5 in (0.75 m)	9 ft 3 in (2.82 m)	25 reps
All values from NFL Combine

Benton (95) hyping up the crowd with the Steelers in 2026

Benton was selected by the Pittsburgh Steelers in the second round, 49th overall, of the 2023 NFL draft. On June 23, 2023, Benton signed a four-year rookie contract with the Steelers. As a rookie, Benton appeared in 17 games and started nine. He finished with one sack, 36 total tackles (16 solo), two passes defended, and two forced fumbles.

On December 8, 2024, Benton recorded his first NFL interception, off Cleveland Browns quarterback Jameis Winston in a 27–14 Steelers win.

On August 14, 2026, the Steelers signed Benton to a four-year, $72 million contract extension.

== NFL career statistics ==
Legend
**Bold**	Career high

=== Regular season ===
Year	Team	Games		Tackles					Interceptions						Fumbles				
Year	Team	GP	GS	Cmb	Solo	Ast	Sck	TFL	Int	Yds	Avg	Lng	TD	PD	FF	Fum	FR	Yds	TD
2023	PIT	17	9	36	16	20	1.0	1	0	0	0.0	0	0	2	**2**	0	0	0	0
2024	PIT	17	14	36	16	20	1.0	2	**1**	**11**	**11.0**	**11**	0	**6**	0	0	**1**	0	0
2025	PIT	17	17	**51**	**25**	**26**	**5.5**	**6**	0	0	0.0	0	0	1	1	0	0	0	0
Career		51	40	123	57	66	7.5	9	1	11	11.0	11	0	9	3	0	1	0	0

=== Postseason ===
Year	Team	Games		Tackles					Interceptions						Fumbles				
Year	Team	GP	GS	Cmb	Solo	Ast	Sck	TFL	Int	Yds	Avg	Lng	TD	PD	FF	Fum	FR	Yds	TD
2023	PIT	1	0	**5**	1	**4**	0.0	0	0	0	0.0	0	0	0	0	0	0	0	0
2024	PIT	1	1	4	**2**	2	0.0	0	0	0	0.0	0	0	0	0	0	0	0	0
2025	PIT	1	1	4	1	3	**1.0**	**1**	0	0	0.0	0	0	0	**1**	0	0	0	0
Career		3	2	13	4	9	1.0	1	0	0	0.0	0	0	0	1	0	0	0	0
