= Maema Njongmeta =

American football player (born 2001)

Profile
- Position: Linebacker

Personal information
- Born: March 9, 2001 (age 25); Ngaoundéré, Cameroon
- Listed height: 6 ft 0 in (1.83 m)
- Listed weight: 230 lb (104 kg)

Career information
- High school: Stevenson (Lincolnshire, Illinois, U.S.)
- College: Wisconsin (2019–2023)
- NFL draft: 2024: undrafted

Career history
- Cincinnati Bengals (2024–2025); Carolina Panthers (2025–2026)

Awards and highlights
- Third-team All-Big Ten (2022)

Career NFL statistics as of 2025
- Total tackles: 23
- Fumble recoveries: 2
- Stats at Pro Football Reference

Maema Njongmeta (born March 9, 2001) is a Cameroonian-American professional football linebacker. He played college football for the Wisconsin Badgers.

== Early life ==
Njongmeta was born in Cameroon, and moved to the United States in 2004.

Njongmeta's hometown is Buffalo Grove, Illinois and attended Stevenson High School and Aptakisic Junior High School. In his high school career he notched 196 tackles with 34 going for a loss, 19 sacks, three fumble recoveries, and two forced fumbles. He committed to play college football at the University of Wisconsin over other schools such as Iowa State, Navy, and Tulane.

== College career ==
In Njongmeta's first two seasons in 2019 and 2020, he redshirted and only appeared in one game in which he recorded no statistics. In the 2021 season, Njongmeta totalled four tackles in two games. In week three of the 2022 season, Njongmeta tallied his first career interception, as he helped the Badgers rout New Mexico State 66–7. In week eleven Njongmeta recorded a sack to help end a drive, but Wisconsin ended up losing to Iowa 24–10. In week twelve, Njongmeta notched 2.5 tackles for loss and one sack, as helped the Badgers become bowl eligible by beating Nebraska 15–14. In the Badgers season finale, Njongmeta had a career performance, tallying 12 tackles with 2.5 going for a loss, and 0.5 sack, but Wisconsin fell to Minnesota 23–16. Njongmeta finished his breakout 2022 season with 95 tackles with 11.5 being for a loss, 3.5 sacks, a pass deflection, and an interception. For his performance on the season, Njongmeta was named third team all-Big Ten by the media. Ahead of the 2023 season, Njongmeta was named to the watch list for multiple awards: the Bronko Nagurski Trophy, the Rotary Lombardi Award, the Bednarik Award, and the Butkus Award.

=== College statistics ===
| Season | Team | Games | | Tackles | | | | | | Int & Fum | | | |
| Season | Team | GP | GS | Solo | Ast | Cmb | TfL | Yds | Sck | Int | PD | FF | FR |
|---|---|---|---|---|---|---|---|---|---|---|---|---|---|
| 2019 | Wisconsin | 0 | 0 | Redshirted | | | | | | | | | |
| 2020 | Wisconsin | 1 | 0 | 0 | 0 | 0 | 0.0 | 0 | 0.0 | 0 | 0 | 0 | 0 |
| 2021 | Wisconsin | 6 | 0 | 2 | 2 | 4 | 0.0 | 0 | 0.0 | 0 | 0 | 0 | 0 |
| 2022 | Wisconsin | 13 | 11 | 48 | 47 | 95 | 11.5 | 40 | 3.5 | 1 | 1 | 0 | 0 |
| 2023 | Wisconsin | 13 | 10 | 30 | 29 | 59 | 8.5 | 16 | 3.0 | 0 | 1 | 0 | 3 |
| Career | | 33 | 21 | 80 | 78 | 158 | 20.0 | 56 | 6.5 | 1 | 2 | 0 | 3 |

== Professional career ==
Pre-draft measurables
| Height | Weight | Arm length | Hand span | Wingspan | 40-yard dash | 10-yard split | 20-yard split | 20-yard shuttle | Three-cone drill | Vertical jump | Broad jump | Bench press |
|---|---|---|---|---|---|---|---|---|---|---|---|---|
| 5 ft 11 3/4 in (1.82 m) | 229 lb (104 kg) | 32 1/8 in (0.82 m) | 9 3/8 in (0.24 m) | 6 ft 6 1/4 in (1.99 m) | 4.80 s | 1.68 s | 2.75 s | 4.61 s | 7.32 s | 34.5 in (0.88 m) | 9 ft 8 in (2.95 m) | 15 reps |
All values from NFL Combine/Pro Day

=== Cincinnati Bengals ===
Njongmeta signed with the Cincinnati Bengals as an undrafted free agent on May 10, 2024. Njongmeta was among the 53 players to make the Bengals' Week 1 roster.

On August 26, 2025, Njongmeta was waived by the Bengals as part of final roster cuts and re-signed to the practice squad the next day.

=== Carolina Panthers ===
On September 16, 2025, Njongmeta was signed by the Carolina Panthers off the Bengals practice squad.

On August 30, 2026, Njongmeta was waived by the Panthers as a part of final roster cuts. He was re-signed to the team's practice squad on September 23, and promoted to the active roster three days later. On September 29, Njongmeta was waived and re-signed to the practice squad two days later. He was released on November 2.
