= Braelon Allen =

American football player (born 2004)

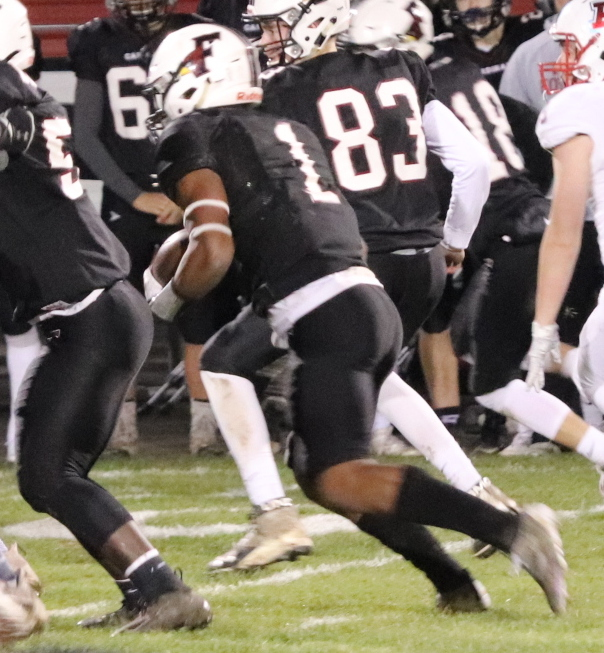
- Allen (#1) at Fond du Lac High School in 2019

No. 0 – New York Jets
- Position: Running back
- Roster status: Active

Personal information
- Born: January 20, 2004 (age 22); Fond du Lac, Wisconsin, U.S.
- Listed height: 6 ft 1 in (1.85 m)
- Listed weight: 235 lb (107 kg)

Career information
- High school: Fond du Lac
- College: Wisconsin (2021–2023)
- NFL draft: 2024: 4th round, 134th overall pick

Career history
- New York Jets (2024–present)

Awards and highlights
- 3× Second-team All-Big Ten (2021–2023)

Career NFL statistics as of Week 10, 2026
- Rushing yards: 1,048
- Rushing average: 4.4
- Rushing touchdowns: 6
- Receptions: 41
- Receiving yards: 273
- Receiving touchdowns: 1
- Stats at Pro Football Reference

Braelon Allen (BRAY-lən; born January 20, 2004) is an American professional football running back for the New York Jets of the National Football League (NFL). He played college football for the Wisconsin Badgers and was selected by the Jets in the fourth round of the 2024 NFL draft.

== Early life ==
Allen attended and played football at Fond du Lac High School, where he reclassified and graduated a year early. Allen wrestled his Freshmen year at Fond du Lac, where he qualified for the state tournament.

== College career ==
Allen was rated as a four-star recruit by ESPN, 247Sports.com, and Rivals.com. Allen committed to play football at the University of Wisconsin–Madison on July 14, 2020, the college's first commit for the 2022 class. On September 17, 2020, he announced he would be reclassifying to the 2021 recruiting class to enroll in college early. He was initially recruited as a defensive player, possibly linebacker or safety, before ultimately ending up at running back.

Allen played on special teams only for his first college game. After the team started the season at 1–3, Allen began to see some snaps along with starting tailback Chez Mellusi. Tailback redshirt freshman Jalen Berger left the team and three running backs transferred away from the college. Allen had his first 100-yard rushing performance in the fifth game against Illinois. In early November, Mellusi had a season-ending injury as Allen was established as the team's starting running back. In the 2021 Las Vegas Bowl against Arizona State, Allen rushed for 159 yards and was named the Las Vegas Bowl MVP. On November 28, 2023, Allen announced his intent to enter the 2024 NFL Draft.

=== Statistics ===
Year	Team	Games		Rushing				Receiving			
Year	Team	GP	GS	Att	Yds	Avg	TD	Rec	Yds	Avg	TD
2021	Wisconsin	12	4	186	1,268	6.8	12	8	39	4.9	0
2022	Wisconsin	12	12	230	1,248	5.4	11	13	104	8.0	0
2023	Wisconsin	11	9	181	984	5.4	12	28	132	4.7	0
Career		35	25	597	3,494	5.9	35	49	275	5.6	0

Wisconsin Badgers records

- Most consecutive games with at least 100 rushing yards, freshman: 7 (2021)
- Longest rushing touchdown: 96 yards (2022)

== Professional career ==
Pre-draft measurables
Height	Weight	Arm length	Hand span	Wingspan	Vertical jump	Broad jump	Bench press
6 ft 1 1/4 in (1.86 m)	235 lb (107 kg)	31 1/4 in (0.79 m)	9 1/4 in (0.23 m)	6 ft 4 1/4 in (1.94 m)	32.0 in (0.81 m)	9 ft 9 in (2.97 m)	26 reps
All values from NFL Combine

=== New York Jets ===
==== 2024 ====
Allen was selected in the fourth round with the 134th overall pick in the 2024 NFL draft by the New York Jets. For a time, Allen was the youngest player in the NFL. In Week 2 against the Tennessee Titans, he scored one rushing touchdown and one receiving touchdown for his firsts as a professional. Allen appeared in all 17 games for New York during his rookie campaign, including two starts, and recorded 334 rushing yards, 148 receiving yards, and three total touchdowns.

==== 2025 ====
Allen began the 2025 season as Breece Hall's backup, recording 93 total yards and one touchdown over his first four games of the season. After suffering an MCL injury in Week 4 against the Miami Dolphins, Allen was ruled out for 8-to-12 weeks and placed on injured reserve.

== NFL career statistics ==
Year	Team	Games		Rushing					Receiving					Fumbles	
Year	Team	GP	GS	Att	Yds	Y/A	Lng	TD	Rec	Yds	Y/R	Lng	TD	Fum	Lost
2024	NYJ	17	0	92	334	3.6	20	2	19	148	7.8	15	1	0	0
2025	NYJ	4	0	18	76	4.2	15	1	2	17	8.5	12	0	1	1
2026	NYJ	10	5	128	638	5.0	27	3	20	108	5.4	19	0	2	0
Career		31	7	238	1,048	4.4	27	6	41	273	6.7	19	1	3	1
