= Jordan Turner (American football) =

American football player (born 2001)

No. 55 – Denver Broncos
- Position: Inside linebacker
- Roster status: Active

Personal information
- Born: December 13, 2001 (age 24); Farmington Hills, Michigan, U.S.
- Listed height: 6 ft 1 in (1.85 m)
- Listed weight: 231 lb (105 kg)

Career information
- High school: Farmington (Farmington, Michigan)
- College: Wisconsin (2020–2023); Michigan State (2024)
- NFL draft: 2025: undrafted

Career history
- Denver Broncos (2025–present)

Awards and highlights
- Guaranteed Rate Bowl Defensive MVP (2022)

Career NFL statistics as of Week 18, 2025
- Games played: 7
- Tackles: 7
- Stats at Pro Football Reference

Jordan Turner (born December 13, 2001) is an American professional football inside linebacker for the Denver Broncos of the National Football League (NFL). He played college football for the Wisconsin Badgers and Michigan State Spartans and was signed by the Broncos as an undrafted free agent in 2025.

== Early life ==
Turner attended Farmington High School in Farmington, Michigan. He was rated as a three-star recruit and committed to play college football for the Wisconsin Badgers.

== College career ==
=== Wisconsin ===
During Turner's first collegiate season in 2021, he notched six tackles with one being for a loss, and two interceptions on just 24 snaps. In week 9 of the 2022 season, he notched six tackles and an interception in a win over Purdue. In the 2022 Guaranteed Rate Bowl, Turner earned game MVP honors after he tallied eight tackles with one and a half being for a loss in the win over Oklahoma State. Turner finished the 2022 season playing in all 13 games with 11 starts for the Badgers, where he totaled 65 tackles with five being for a loss, two sacks, a pass deflection, an interception, and a forced fumble. During the 2023 season, Turner notched 61 tackles with six and a half being for a loss, three sacks, and a forced fumble. After the season, Turner entered his name into the NCAA transfer portal.

=== Michigan State ===
Turner transferred to play for the Michigan State Spartans. In week 5 of the 2024 season, he totaled nine tackles and an interception in a loss to Ohio State.

== Professional career ==
Pre-draft measurables
Height	Weight	Arm length	Hand span	Wingspan	40-yard dash	10-yard split	20-yard split	20-yard shuttle	Three-cone drill	Vertical jump	Bench press
6 ft 0 7/8 in (1.85 m)	235 lb (107 kg)	31 1/2 in (0.80 m)	9 1/2 in (0.24 m)	6 ft 4 1/2 in (1.94 m)	4.75 s	1.60 s	2.79 s	4.36 s	7.01 s	33.0 in (0.84 m)	25 reps
All values from Pro Day

After going unselected in the 2025 NFL draft, Turner attended the rookie minicamp of the Denver Broncos. On May 12, 2025, he was signed to the Broncos roster. On August 26, he was waived by the Broncos. The next day, he was re-signed to the practice squad.

Turner made his NFL debut when he was elevated from the practice squad for Week 8 against the Dallas Cowboys, following the suspension of Dre Greenlaw. On December 13, he was promoted to the active roster on his birthday.

On July 26, 2026, Turner was placed on the Active/Non-football injury list ahead of training camp.
