= John Torchio =

American football cornerback (born 1999)

No. 10
- Position: Safety

Personal information
- Born: September 11, 1999 (age 27); Lafayette, California, U.S.
- Listed height: 6 ft 1 in (1.85 m)
- Listed weight: 211 lb (96 kg)

Career information
- High school: Campolindo (Moraga, California)
- College: Wisconsin (2018–2022)
- NFL draft: 2023: undrafted

Awards and highlights
- First-team All-Big Ten (2022)

John Torchio (born September 11, 1999) is an American former college football safety.

== Early life ==
Torchio grew up in Lafayette, California and attended Campolindo High School, where he played baseball, basketball, and football. He played safety and wide receiver before becoming Campolindo's starting quarterback before his senior season. Torchio was named first team All-State after passing for 3,314 yards and 37 touchdowns and rushing for 761 yards and 11 touchdowns on offense and was also named the Diablo Athletic League Defensive Player of the Year on defense. Torchio was offered a scholarships to play college football at California, Rice, San Diego, and San Jose State but opted to commit to play at Wisconsin and join the team as a preferred walk-on.

== College career ==
Torchio redshirted his true freshman season at Wisconsin after joining the team as a walk-on. He played in eight games with one start during his redshirt freshman season and had three tackles, three passes broken up, and one interception. Torchio was awarded a scholarship prior to the start of the 2021 season He played in all 13 of Wisconsin's games as a junior and recorded 35 tackles with three tackles for loss and tied for the team lead with three interceptions. He entered his senior season as the Badgers' starting safety. Torchio was named the Big Ten Conference Defensive Player of the Week after recording a team-high 10 tackles and intercepting two passes, one of which he returned for a touchdown, in a 35-24 win over Purdue on October 22, 2022.

== Professional career ==
After going undrafted in the 2023 NFL draft, Torchio accepted an invite from the New York Jets to attend their rookie minicamp. He also had an invite from the Tennessee Titans.

== Personal life ==
Both Torchio's father and grandfather played college football at California. His older sister, Katharine, played soccer at Wisconsin.
