= Darryl Peterson III =

American football player (born 2003)

No. 59 – Los Angeles Rams
- Position: Outside linebacker
- Roster status: Active

Personal information
- Born: September 13, 2003 (age 23); Akron, Ohio, U.S.
- Listed height: 6 ft 1 in (1.85 m)
- Listed weight: 260 lb (118 kg)

Career information
- High school: Archbishop Hoban (Akron)
- College: Wisconsin (2021–2025)
- NFL draft: 2026: undrafted

Career history
- Los Angeles Rams (2026–present)

Career NFL statistics as of Week 4, 2026
- Games played: 1
- Stats at Pro Football Reference

Darryl Peterson III (born September 13, 2003) is an American professional football outside linebacker for the Los Angeles Rams of the National Football League (NFL). He played college football for the Wisconsin Badgers.

== Early life ==
Peterson III was born on September 13, 2003, in Akron, Ohio. He attended Archbishop Hoban High School in Akron. Peterson III was rated as a three-star recruit by 247Sports, and committed to play college football for the Wisconsin Badgers.

== College career ==
In five seasons at Wisconsin from 2021 to 2025, Peterson III appeared in 53 games and was a two-year starter, totaling 139 tackles with 24.5 going for a loss, 14 sacks, and seven pass deflections. After the 2025 season, he declared for the NFL draft.

== Professional career ==
Pre-draft measurables
Height	Weight	Arm length	Hand span	Wingspan	40-yard dash	10-yard split	20-yard split	20-yard shuttle	Three-cone drill	Vertical jump	Broad jump	Bench press
6 ft 1 1/4 in (1.86 m)	248 lb (112 kg)	32 1/2 in (0.83 m)	9 5/8 in (0.24 m)	6 ft 6 3/8 in (1.99 m)	4.88 s	1.65 s	2.77 s	4.40 s	7.35 s	35.0 in (0.89 m)	9 ft 2 in (2.79 m)	22 reps
All values from Pro Day

After not being selected in the 2026 NFL draft, Peterson III signed with the Los Angeles Rams as an undrafted free agent. On August 30, 2026, Peterson was waived by the Rams as a part of final roster cuts; he was re-signed to the team's practice squad the following day. He was promoted to the active roster on October 21.

== Personal life ==
Peterson's brother, Darryn Peterson, plays in the National Basketball Association for the Utah Jazz.
