= Logan Bruss =

American football player (born 1998)

Profile
- Position: Offensive guard

Personal information
- Born: October 6, 1998 (age 28); Kimberly, Wisconsin, U.S.
- Listed height: 6 ft 5 in (1.96 m)
- Listed weight: 317 lb (144 kg)

Career information
- High school: Kimberly
- College: Wisconsin (2017–2021)
- NFL draft: 2022: 3rd round, 104th overall pick

Career history
- Los Angeles Rams (2022–2024); Tennessee Titans (2024)

Awards and highlights
- Second-team All-Big Ten (2021)

Career NFL statistics as of 2024
- Games played: 11
- Games started: 3
- Stats at Pro Football Reference

Logan Bruss (born October 6, 1998) is an American professional football offensive guard for the Louisville Kings of the United Football League (UFL). He has previously played in the National Football League (NFL) for the Los Angeles Rams and Tennessee Titans. He played college football for the Wisconsin Badgers.

== Professional career ==
Pre-draft measurables
Height	Weight	Arm length	Hand span	Wingspan	40-yard dash	10-yard split	20-yard split	20-yard shuttle	Three-cone drill	Vertical jump	Broad jump
6 ft 5 in (1.96 m)	309 lb (140 kg)	33 1/8 in (0.84 m)	10 3/4 in (0.27 m)	6 ft 7 3/4 in (2.03 m)	5.32 s	1.76 s	3.01 s	4.55 s	7.57 s	31.0 in (0.79 m)	9 ft 4 in (2.84 m)
All values from NFL Combine

=== Los Angeles Rams ===
Bruss was selected by the Los Angeles Rams in the third round, 104th overall, of the 2022 NFL draft. He suffered a torn ACL and MCL in the team's second preseason game and was ruled out for his rookie season.

On August 29, 2023, Bruss was waived by the Rams and re-signed to the practice squad. He signed a reserve/future contract on January 15, 2024.

Bruss made his NFL debut in 2024, playing in eight games (three starts). On November 11, 2024, Bruss was waived by the Rams after Steve Avila and Jonah Jackson were activated from injured reserve.

=== Tennessee Titans ===
Bruss was claimed off waivers by the Tennessee Titans on November 12, 2024. He appeared in three games for the Titans, but suffered an ACL tear during practice on Week 14. He was placed on injured reserve on December 7, ending his season.

On April 16, 2025, Bruss was waived by the Titans due to a failed physical.

=== Louisville Kings ===
On January 14, 2026, Bruss was selected by the Louisville Kings of the United Football League (UFL).
