= Nick Herbig =

American football player (born 2001)

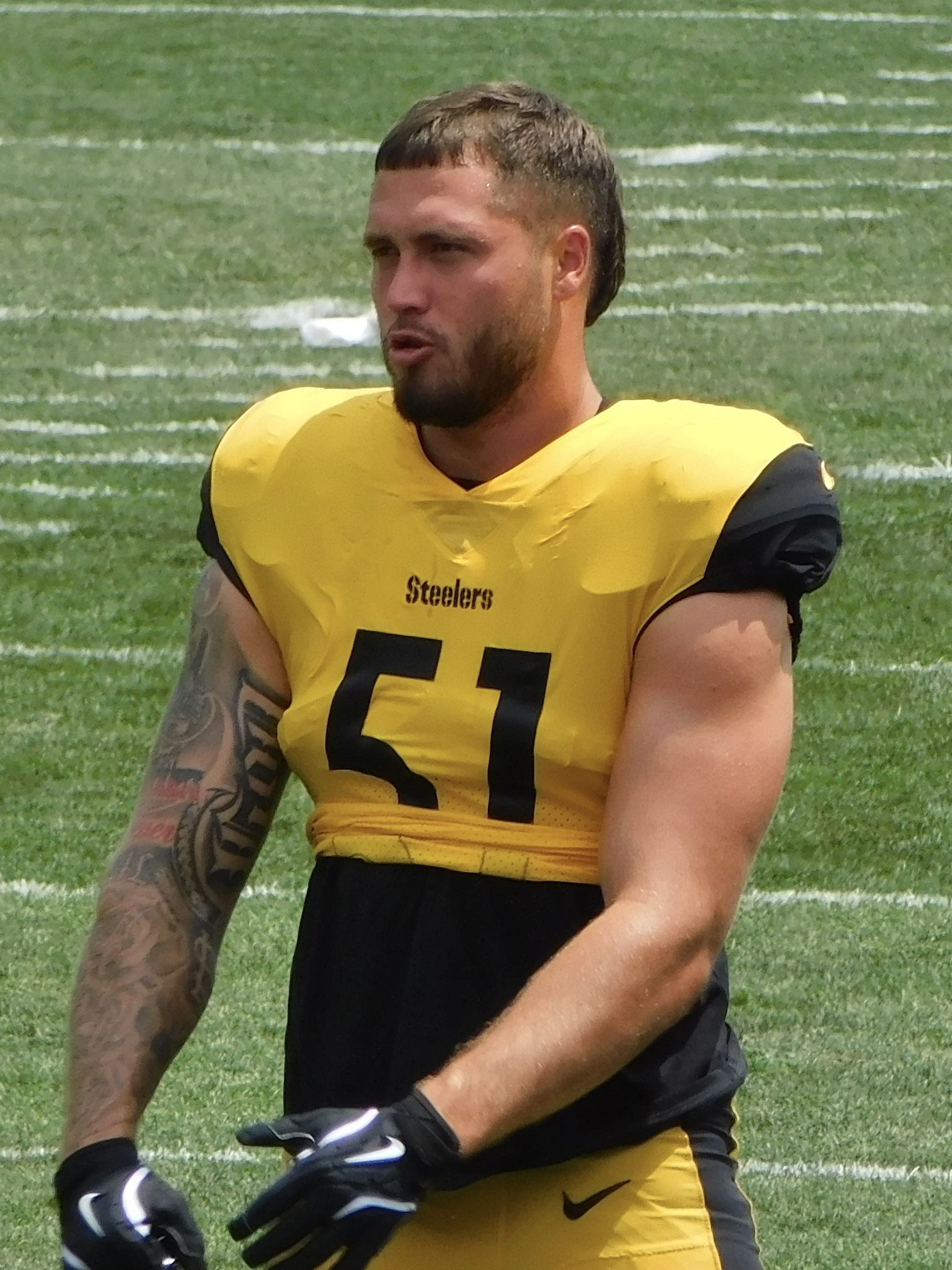
- Herbig with the Pittsburgh Steelers in 2025

No. 51 – Pittsburgh Steelers
- Position: Outside linebacker
- Roster status: Active

Personal information
- Born: November 21, 2001 (age 24); Kauaʻi, Hawaii, U.S.
- Listed height: 6 ft 2 in (1.88 m)
- Listed weight: 240 lb (109 kg)

Career information
- High school: Saint Louis School (Oahu, Hawaii)
- College: Wisconsin (2020–2022)
- NFL draft: 2023: 4th round, 132nd overall pick

Career history
- Pittsburgh Steelers (2023–present)

Awards and highlights
- Third-team All-American (2022); First-team All-Big Ten (2022)

Career NFL statistics as of Week 7, 2026
- Total tackles: 99
- Sacks: 18
- Forced fumbles: 10
- Fumble recoveries: 4
- Interceptions: 1
- Pass deflections: 3
- Defensive touchdowns: 1
- Stats at Pro Football Reference

Nicholas Herbig (born November 21, 2001) is an American professional football outside linebacker for the Pittsburgh Steelers of the National Football League (NFL). He played college football for the Wisconsin Badgers. He was selected by the Steelers in the fourth round of the 2023 NFL draft.

== Early life ==
Herbig is from Kauaʻi, Hawaii. He attended the Saint Louis School in Oahu, Hawaii and committed to play college football at the University of Wisconsin .

== College career ==
Herbig started all seven games in his true freshman year at Wisconsin in 2020, recording 26 tackles and one sack. He returned as a starter in 2021, and had 61 tackles and nine sacks. In 2022 Herbig became the top playmaker on the Wisconsin defense, garnering first-team all-conference as well as third-team Associated Press All-American. He had 47 tackles (15.5 for loss) with 11 sacks and two pass breakups in 11 games. Herbig's sack total tied for sixth in the FBS.

== Professional career ==
Pre-draft measurables
| Height | Weight | Arm length | Hand span | Wingspan | 40-yard dash | 10-yard split | 20-yard split | 20-yard shuttle | Three-cone drill | Vertical jump | Broad jump | Bench press |
|---|---|---|---|---|---|---|---|---|---|---|---|---|
| 6 ft 2 1/8 in (1.88 m) | 240 lb (109 kg) | 31 1/4 in (0.79 m) | 9 1/4 in (0.23 m) | 6 ft 4 in (1.93 m) | 4.65 s | 1.59 s | 2.72 s | 4.35 s | 7.25 s | 34.0 in (0.86 m) | 9 ft 6 in (2.90 m) | 25 reps |
All values from NFL Combine/Pro Day

=== 2023 ===
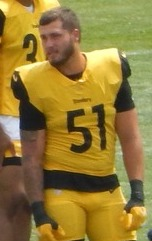
Herbig in 2023

After being selected in the fourth round of the 2023 NFL draft, Herbig signed his rookie contract with the Pittsburgh Steelers. On March 16, 2023, the Pittsburgh Steelers had coincidentally signed his older brother, offensive guard, Nate Herbig.

He made his first start for the Steelers in Week 1's loss to the San Francisco 49ers. He finished the game making one assisted tackle. He made his first forced fumble during the Steelers' loss to the Jacksonville Jaguars, he made a second one during their victory over Seattle on New Year's Eve, 2023. On October 22, 2023, Herbig made his first professional sack on Los Angeles Rams quarterback Matthew Stafford.

As a rookie, Herbig appeared in 17 games. He finished with three sacks, 27 total tackles (19 solo), two forced fumbles, and one fumble recovery. The Steelers ended their season with a 10–7 record and made a playoff appearance, the first of Herbig's professional career.

In the AFC Wild card round against the Buffalo Bills, Herbig made one tackle and played for 20 defensive snaps as well as 19 special teams snaps. The Steelers lost the game 31–17, ending their season.

=== 2024 ===
Herbig made his first appearance of the season in Week 1's win over the Atlanta Falcons. He recorded one tackle. On November 17, 2024, Herbig forced a fumble on Derrick Henry for the first time in 538 touches for Henry. It was Herbig's second forced fumble of the season. Herbig finished his second season with 22 total tackles (13 solo, nine assisted) with five being for tackles for loss. He also had 11 quarterback hits and four forced fumbles, taking 415 defensive snaps as well as 174 special teams snaps.

In Herbig's second postseason appearance, he recorded no statistics, but played 17 defensive and 19 special teams snaps. The Steelers fell in the wild card round to the Baltimore Ravens 28–14.

=== 2026 ===
On June 2, 2026, Herbig signed a four-year, $100 million contract extension with the Steelers.

== Personal life ==
His brother, Nate Herbig, is a former offensive guard in the NFL. Herbig is of partial Japanese, Okinawan, and Native Hawaiian descent.
