= Jalen Berger =

American football player (born 2001)

No. 0 – UCLA Bruins
- Position: Running back
- Class: Redshirt Senior

Personal information
- Born: August 30, 2001 (age 25); Newark, New Jersey, U.S.
- Listed height: 6 ft 1 in (1.85 m)
- Listed weight: 215 lb (98 kg)

Career information
- High school: Don Bosco Prep (Ramsey, New Jersey)
- College: Wisconsin (2020–2021); Michigan State (2022–2023); UCLA (2024–present)
- Stats at ESPN

Jalen Berger (born August 30, 2001) is an American college football running back for the UCLA Bruins. He previously played for the Wisconsin Badgers and the Michigan State Spartans.

== Early life ==
A native of Newark, New Jersey, Berger attended Don Bosco Preparatory High School in Ramsey, New Jersey. As a senior, he rushed 840 yards with 12 touchdowns and added 27 receptions for 357 yards and four touchdowns. Berger was selected to play in the 2020 All-American Bowl. He committed to the University of Wisconsin–Madison to play college football.

== College career ==
=== Wisconsin ===
As a true freshman at Wisconsin in 2020, Berger played in four games and made one start. He led the team with 301 yards on 60 carries with two touchdowns. Berger played in only three games in 2021, before being dismissed from the team. He finished the year with 88 yards on 24 carries with a touchdown.

=== Michigan State ===
After his dismissal, Berger transferred to Michigan State University. He entered the 2022 season splitting carries with fellow transfer, Jarek Broussard.

On April 23, 2024, Berger announced that he would enter the NCAA transfer portal for the second time.

=== UCLA ===
On July 22, 2024, Berger announced that he would transfer to UCLA.

== Professional career ==
Pre-draft measurables
Height	Weight	Arm length	Hand span	Wingspan	40-yard dash	10-yard split	20-yard split	20-yard shuttle	Three-cone drill	Vertical jump	Broad jump	Bench press
5 ft 11 3/4 in (1.82 m)	213 lb (97 kg)	31 5/8 in (0.80 m)	10 1/8 in (0.26 m)	6 ft 4 3/8 in (1.94 m)	4.59 s	1.64 s	2.73 s	4.63 s	7.58 s	35.5 in (0.90 m)	10 ft 1 in (3.07 m)	16 reps
All values from Pro Day
