= 2023 Citrus Bowl =

Postseason college football bowl game

2023 Cheez-It Citrus Bowl
- 77th Citrus Bowl
LSU Tigers	Purdue Boilermakers
(9–4)	(8–5)
SEC	Big Ten
63	7
Head coach: Brian Kelly	Head coach: Brian Brohm (interim)
AP / Coaches / CFP; 16 / 15 / 17
	1	2	3	4	Total
LSU	14	21	14	14	63
Purdue	0	0	0	7	7
- Date: January 2, 2023
- Season: 2022
- Stadium: Camping World Stadium
- Location: Orlando, Florida
- MVP: Malik Nabers (WR, LSU)
- Favorite: LSU by 14.5
- Referee: Kevin Mar (Big 12)
- Attendance: 42,791
- Payout: US$8,224,578

United States TV coverage
- Network: ABC
- Announcers: Bob Wischusen (play-by-play), Dan Orlovsky (analyst), Kris Budden (sideline)

The 2023 Citrus Bowl was a college football bowl game played on January 2, 2023, at Camping World Stadium in Orlando, Florida. The 77th annual Citrus Bowl, the game featured the LSU Tigers of the Southeastern Conference (SEC) and the Purdue Boilermakers of the Big Ten Conference. The game began at 1:08 p.m. EST and was aired on ABC. It was one of the 2022–23 bowl games concluding the 2022 FBS football season. LSU won 63–7. The 56-point margin tied the 2008 GMAC Bowl and 2018 Armed Forces Bowl for the largest bowl game margin at the time; that record was surpassed seven days later when Georgia defeated TCU 65–7 in the CFP national championship game.

On November 15, 2022, Kellogg's, the parent company of the Cheez-It brand which already sponsored the Cheez-It Bowl at Camping World Stadium, announced it had also purchased sponsorship rights to the Citrus Bowl, making it officially the Cheez-It Citrus Bowl.

== Teams ==
On December 4, 2022, it was announced that the game would feature LSU of the Southeastern Conference (SEC) and Purdue of the Big Ten. This was the first-ever meeting between the two programs.

=== LSU ===
LSU played to a 9–3 regular-season record, 6–2 in conference play. They faced three ranked teams, defeating Ole Miss and Alabama while losing to Tennessee. The Tigers qualified for the SEC Championship Game, which they lost to top-ranked Georgia. LSU entered the bowl 17th in the College Football Playoff (CFP) ranking, with an overall 9–4 record.

=== Purdue ===
Purdue compiled an 8–4 regular season record, 6–3 in conference play. They faced two ranked opponents, defeating both Minnesota and Illinois. The Boilermakers qualified for the Big Ten Championship Game, which they lost to second-ranked Michigan. Purdue entered the bowl unranked and with an 8–5 overall record.

== Game summary ==
2023 Citrus Bowl

Quarter	1	2	3	4	Total
No. 17 LSU	14	21	14	14	63
Purdue	0	0	0	7	7

at Camping World Stadium • Orlando, Florida

- Date: January 2, 2023
- Game time: 1:00 p.m. EST
- Game weather: Sunny • Temperature: 79 °F (26 °C) • Wind: 4 mph (6.4 km/h) east
- Game attendance: 42,791
- Referee: Kevin Mar
- TV announcers (ABC): Bob Wischusen, Dan Orlovsky, Kris Budden
- Box score

Scoring summary

Quarter	Time	Drive			Team	Scoring information	Score	
Quarter	Time	Plays	Yards	TOP	Team	Scoring information	LSU	Purdue
1	7:01	10	63	4:46	LSU	John Emery Jr. 1-yard touchdown run, Damian Ramos kick good	7	0
1	1:06	8	67	3:14	LSU	Noah Cain 9-yard touchdown run, Damian Ramos kick good	14	0
2	13:03	5	62	2:05	LSU	Mason Taylor 32-yard touchdown reception from Jayden Daniels, Damian Ramos kick good	21	0
2	8:23	5	70	1:28	LSU	Noah Cain 9-yard touchdown run, Damian Ramos kick good	28	0
2	1:07	5	87	2:04	LSU	Brian Thomas Jr. 10-yard touchdown reception from Garrett Nussmeier, Damian Ramos kick good	35	0
3	9:21	9	45	3:04	LSU	Jayden Daniels 5-yard touchdown reception from Malik Nabers, Damian Ramos kick good	42	0
3	3:15	1	75	0:10	LSU	Malik Nabers 75-yard touchdown reception from Garrett Nussmeier, Damian Ramos kick good	49	0
4	13:53	9	75	4:22	Purdue	TJ Sheffield 16-yard touchdown reception from Michael Alaimo, Mitchell Fineran kick good	49	7
4	8:47	7	55	2:58	LSU	Derrick Davis Jr. 12-yard touchdown run, Ezekeal Mata kick good	56	7
4	0:40				LSU	Interception returned 99 yards for touchdown by Quad Wilson, Trey Finison kick good	63	7
"TOP" = time of possession. For other American football terms, see Glossary of American football.							63	7

LSU set new Citrus Bowl records for most points scored (63), largest margin of victory (56), and total offensive yards (594).

== Statistics ==
Team statistical comparison
Statistic	LSU	Purdue
First downs	27	16
First downs rushing	11	6
First downs passing	16	9
First downs penalty	0	1
Third down efficiency	7–12	4–18
Fourth down efficiency	2–3	3–7
Total plays–net yards	70–594	78–263
Rushing attempts–net yards	32–225	36–94
Yards per rush	7.0	2.6
Yards passing	369	169
Pass completions–attempts	27–38	19–42
Interceptions thrown	1	3
Punt returns–total yards	1–11	2–35
Kickoff returns–total yards	1–22	3–61
Punts–average yardage	2–51.5	6–42.8
Fumbles–lost	1–0	1–0
Penalties–yards	7–72	5–35
Time of possession	29:23	30:37

LSU statistics
Tigers passing
	C–A	Yds	TD–INT
Garrett Nussmeier	11–15	173	2–1
Jayden Daniels	12–17	139	1–0
Malik Nabers	2–2	50	1–0
Walker Howard	2–4	7	0–0
Tigers rushing
	Car	Yds	TD
Jayden Daniels	6	67	0
Noah Cain	8	58	2
John Emery Jr.	7	52	1
Derrick Davis Jr.	6	29	1
Walker Howard	3	18	0
Nick Demas	1	2	0
Tigers receiving
	Rec	Yds	TD
Malik Nabers	9	163	1
Mason Taylor	5	88	1
Kyren Lacy	2	57	0
Brian Thomas Jr.	4	31	1
Landon Ibieta	2	15	0
Jayden Daniels	1	5	1
Noah Cain	2	5	0
John Emery Jr.	1	3	0
Javen Nicholas	1	2	0

Purdue statistics
Boilermakers passing
	C–A	Yds	TD–INT
Austin Burton	12–24	74	0–1
Michael Alaimo	4–11	37	1–1
Jack Albers	2–6	32	0–1
Abdur-rahmaan Yaseen	1–1	26	0–0
Boilermakers rushing
	Car	Yds	TD
Devin Mockobee	13	48	0
Tyrone Tracy Jr.	4	26	0
Michael Alaimo	5	15	0
Ryan Brandt	1	7	0
Jack Sullivan	1	5	0
Deion Burks	1	4	0
Jacob Wahlberg	2	4	0
Caleb Lahey	1	2	0
Jack Albers	1	1	0
Dylan Downing	1	−1	0
TJ Sheffield	1	−3	0
Austin Burton	5	−14	0
Boilermakers receiving
	Rec	Yds	TD
TJ Sheffield	7	56	1
Devin Mockobee	3	26	0
Abdur-rahmaan Yaseen	2	21	0
Max Klare	1	20	0
Tyrone Tracy Jr	2	13	0
Ben Buechel	1	12	0
Paul Piferi	1	11	0
Mershawn Rice	2	10	0

== See also ==
- 2022 Cheez-It Bowl, contested at the same venue on December 29, and also sponsored by Cheez-It
