= 2022 Big Ten Football Championship Game =

- Conference Championship
Purdue Boilermakers	Michigan Wolverines
(8–4)	(12–0)
22	43
Head coach: Jeff Brohm	Head coach: Jim Harbaugh
	AP / Coaches / CFP; 2 / 2 / 2
	1	2	3	4	Total
Purdue	7	6	3	6	22
Michigan	7	7	14	15	43
- Date: December 3, 2022
- Season: 2022
- Stadium: Lucas Oil Stadium
- Location: Indianapolis, Indiana
- MVP: Donovan Edwards, RB, Michigan
- Favorite: Michigan by 16.5
- Referee: Jerry McGinn
- Attendance: 67,107

United States TV coverage
- Network: Fox
- Announcers: Gus Johnson (play-by-play), Joel Klatt (analyst) and Allison Williams (sideline)

2022 Big Ten Conference football standings
	Conf.			Overall
Team	W		L	W		L
East Division
No. 3 Michigan xy$^	9	–	0	13	–	1
No. 4 Ohio State ^	8	–	1	11	–	2
No. 7 Penn State	7	–	2	11	–	2
Maryland	4	–	5	8	–	5
Indiana	2	–	7	4	–	8
Rutgers	1	–	8	4	–	8
Michigan State†	0	–	6	0	–	7
West Division
Purdue xy	6	–	3	8	–	6
Illinois	5	–	4	8	–	5
Iowa	5	–	4	8	–	5
Minnesota	5	–	4	9	–	4
Wisconsin	4	–	5	7	–	6
Nebraska	3	–	6	4	–	8
Northwestern	1	–	8	1	–	11
Championship: Michigan 43, Purdue 22
^ – College Football Playoff participant; $ – Conference champion; x – Division champion/co-champions; y – Championship game participant; † — NCAA vacated all wins for Michigan State (5–7, 3–6); Rankings from AP Poll

The 2022 Big Ten Football Championship Game was a college football game that was played on December 3, 2022, at Lucas Oil Stadium in Indianapolis, Indiana. It was the 12th edition of the Big Ten Football Championship Game and determined the champion of the conference for the 2022 season. The game began at 8:00 p.m. EST and aired on Fox. The game featured the Purdue Boilermakers, the West Division champions, and the No. 2 Michigan Wolverines, the East Division champions.

== Teams ==
=== Purdue Boilermakers ===
Entering the final week of the regular season, Iowa, Purdue, and Illinois were in contention for the West division title. Iowa would have been able to clinch with a win, but was upset by Nebraska, giving Purdue the opportunity to clinch the berth with a win. Purdue beat in-state rivals Indiana 30–16 to clinch the division title and their first Big Ten Championship Game appearance in program history.

=== Michigan Wolverines ===
Entering the final week of the regular season, Michigan and Ohio State both had undefeated conference records at 8–0 going into the 2022 edition of The Game in Columbus, thus making the game a de facto East division championship. Michigan won the game 45–23, outscoring the Buckeyes 28–3 in the second half, and clinched the division title for the second consecutive season.

== Game summary ==
2022 Big Ten Championship Game presented by Discover

Quarter	1	2	3	4	Total
Purdue	7	6	3	6	22
No. 2 Michigan	7	7	14	15	43

at Lucas Oil Stadium • Indianapolis, Indiana

- Date: December 3, 2022
- Game time: 8:00 p.m. EST
- Referee: Jerry McGinn
- TV announcers (Fox): Gus Johnson (play-by-play), Joel Klatt (analyst), Allison Williams (sideline)

Game information

First quarter

- (9:11) MICH - Colston Loveland 25-yd pass from J. J. McCarthy (Jake Moody Kick) (Michigan 7-0)
- (4:13) PUR - Devin Mockobee 1-yd rush (Mitchell Fineran Kick) (Tied 7-7)

Second quarter

- (13:39) PUR - Mitchell Fineran 33-yd field goal (Purdue 10-7)
- (7:05) MICH - Luke Schoonmaker 7-yd pass from J. J. McCarthy (Jake Moody Kick) (Michigan 14-10)
- (1:23) PUR - Mitchell Fineran 45-yd field goal (Michigan 14-13)

Third quarter

- (12:25) MICH - Kalel Mullings 1-yd rush (Jake Moody Kick) (Michigan 21-13)
- (10:32) MICH - Donovan Edwards 27-yd rush (Jake Moody Kick) (Michigan 28-13)
- (3:37) PUR - Mitchell Fineran 43-yd field goal (Michigan 28-16)

Fourth quarter

- (12:37) PUR - Mitchell Fineran 27-yd field goal (Michigan 28-19)
- (9:06) MICH - Ronnie Bell 16-yd pass from J. J. McCarthy (Luke Schoonmaker pass from J. J. McCarthy for 2-pt Conversion) (Michigan 36-19)
- (5:07) PUR - Mitchell Fineran 32-yd field goal (Michigan 36-22)
- (1:22) MICH - Kalel Mullings 3-yd rush (Jake Moody Kick) (Michigan 43-22)

== Statistics ==
=== Team statistics ===
Team statistical comparison
Statistic	Purdue	No. 2 Michigan
First downs	27	17
Third down efficiency	9–18	6–12
Fourth down efficiency	1–1	2–2
Total plays–net yards	84–456	55–386
Rushing attempts–net yards	37–90	38–225
Yards per rush	2.4	5.9
Yards passing	366	161
Pass completions–attempts	32–47	11–17
Interceptions thrown	2	1
Punt returns–total yards	1–0	1–1
Kickoff returns–total yards	2–32	1–24
Punts–total yardage	2–85	4–164
Fumbles–lost	2–0	0–0
Penalties–yards	5–38	3–25
Time of possession	33:42	26:18

=== Individual statistics ===
Purdue statistics
Boilermakers passing
	C–A	Yds	TD	INT
Aidan O'Connell	32–47	366	0	2
Boilermakers rushing
	Car	Yds	TD	Avg
Devin Mockobee	17	71	1	4.2
Tyrone Tracy Jr.	2	25	0	12.5
Dylan Downing	6	15	0	2.5
TJ Sheffield	1	5	0	5.0
Payne Durham	1	4	0	4.0
Charlie Jones	2	3	0	1.5
Kobe Lewis	2	3	0	1.5
Aidan O'Connell	6	-36	0	-6.0
Boilermakers receiving
	Rec	Yds	TD	Avg
Charlie Jones	13	162	0	12.5
TJ Sheffield	4	54	0	13.5
Mershawn Rice	4	46	0	11.5
Devin Mockobee	6	31	0	5.2
Paul Piferi	1	26	0	26.0
Andrew Sowinski	1	24	0	24.0
Dylan Downing	1	13	0	13.0
Payne Durham	2	10	0	5.0

Michigan statistics
Wolverines passing
	C–A	Yds	TD	INT
J. J. McCarthy	11–17	161	3	1
Wolverines rushing
	Car	Yds	TD	Avg
Donovan Edwards	25	185	1	7.4
Kalel Mullings	8	26	2	3.3
J. J. McCarthy	5	14	0	2.8
Wolverines receiving
	Rec	Yds	TD	Avg
Ronnie Bell	5	67	1	13.4
Luke Schoonmaker	3	56	1	18.7
Colston Loveland	1	25	1	25.0
Cornelius Johnson	1	9	0	9.0
Donovan Edwards	1	4	0	4.0

== Sign stealing allegations ==
On November 7, 2023, evidence was submitted by Michigan showing that prior to Michigan's victory over Purdue, Ohio State shared offensive signals with Purdue, while Rutgers shared defensive signals.

== See also ==
- List of Big Ten Conference football champions
