= Charlie Jones (American football, born 1998) =

American football player (born 1998)

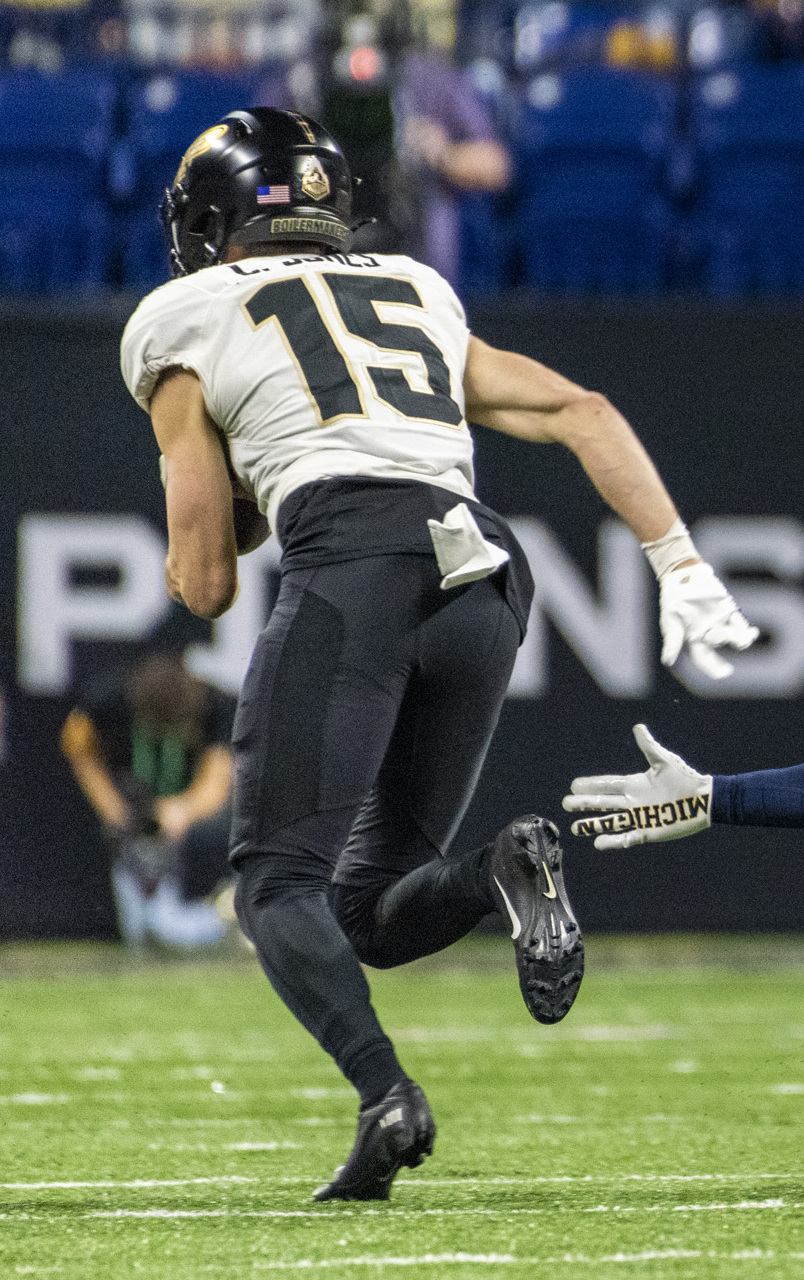
- Jones with the Purdue Boilermakers in 2022

No. 89 – New York Giants
- Positions: Wide receiver, return specialist
- Roster status: Practice squad

Personal information
- Born: October 29, 1998 (age 28); Deerfield, Illinois, U.S.
- Listed height: 6 ft 0 in (1.83 m)
- Listed weight: 190 lb (86 kg)

Career information
- High school: Deerfield
- College: Buffalo (2017–2019); Iowa (2019–2021); Purdue (2022)
- NFL draft: 2023: 4th round, 131st overall pick

Career history
- Cincinnati Bengals (2023–2025); New York Giants (2026–present)

Awards and highlights
- Second-team All-American (2022); Big Ten Return Specialist of the Year (2021); 2× First-team All-Big Ten (2021, 2022); Second-team All-Big Ten (2020)

Career NFL statistics as of Week 9, 2026
- Receptions: 10
- Receiving yards: 135
- Rushing yards: 13
- Return yards: 2,237
- Return touchdowns: 3
- Stats at Pro Football Reference

Charlie Jones (born October 29, 1998) is an American professional football wide receiver and return specialist for the New York Giants. He played college football for the Buffalo Bulls, Iowa Hawkeyes, and Purdue Boilermakers. Jones was an All-American with Purdue in 2022, and was selected by the Bengals in the 2023 NFL draft.

== Early life ==
Jones grew up in Deerfield, Illinois and attended Deerfield High School. He committed to play college football at Buffalo over offers from Ball State, Bowling Green, North Dakota State, Northern Illinois, Western Michigan, and Wyoming.

== College career ==
=== Buffalo ===
Jones began his collegiate career at the University at Buffalo. He redshirted his true freshman season. As a redshirt freshman, Jones caught 18 passes for 395 yards and three touchdowns and returned 15 kickoffs for 289 yards. Jones said he "liked it at Buffalo" where he "got to learn a lot as a young player" but, after star players Tyree Jackson, Anthony Johnson and K. J. Osborn either declared for the NFL draft or transferred, Jones also entered the transfer portal. He felt he could "play against the best of the best" and expected to receive scholarship offers from more prestigious programs but received none. Nonetheless, he chose to transfer to the University of Iowa, where he felt "walk-ons traditionally get a fair chance."

=== Iowa ===
Jones joined the Hawkeyes as a walk-on and sat out his first season at Iowa due to NCAA transfer rules. He entered his first season at Iowa as the team's primary punt returner. Jones finished the 2020 season with 21 punt returns for 221 yards and one touchdown and was named second team All-Big Ten Conference as a returner by the league's coaches. He was also awarded a scholarship during the season. As a redshirt senior, Jones was named first team All-Big Ten and the Rodgers-Dwight Return Specialist of the Year after he returned 37 punts for 285 yards and also returned 25 kickoffs for 635 yards and one touchdown. He was also a starter at receiver for the Hawkeyes and had 21 receptions for 323 yards and three touchdowns. After the season, Jones entered the NCAA transfer portal.

=== Purdue ===
Jones ultimately transferred to Purdue University for his final season of eligibility. He took the opportunity to reunite with childhood friend, Aidan O’Connell, who was the current starting quarterback for the Boilermakers. At Purdue, Jones caught 110 passes, becoming just one of three Boilermakers in history to record 100 catches in a single season and set the school-record for receiving yards in a single season with 1,361 yards. Jones’ 12 receiving touchdowns are also the 4th most in school history in a single season. Following the 2022 Big Ten Championship Game, Jones decided to forgo participation in the 2023 Citrus Bowl and prepare for the 2023 NFL draft. Jones was a consensus Second Team All-American and First Team All-Big Ten recipient. Jones led the nation in receptions, finished second in receiving yards, and fifth in receiving touchdowns.

=== Statistics ===
Year	Team	Games		Receiving				Rushing				Kick returns				Punt returns			
Year	Team	GP	GS	Rec	Yards	Avg	TD	Att	Yards	Avg	TD	Ret	Yards	Avg	TD	Ret	Yards	Avg	TD
2017	Buffalo	Redshirt (redshirt)																	
2018	Buffalo	12	1	18	395	21.9	3	0	0	0.0	0	15	289	19.3	0	0	0	0.0	0
2019	Iowa	Sat out due to NCAA transfer rules																	
2020	Iowa	7	0	0	0	0.0	0	2	38	19.0	0	0	0	0.0	0	22	223	10.1	1
2021	Iowa	14	10	21	323	15.4	3	7	8	1.1	0	25	635	25.4	1	37	285	7.7	0
2022	Purdue	13	13	110	1,361	12.4	12	2	3	1.5	0	5	78	15.6	0	18	114	6.3	0
Career		46	24	149	2,079	14.0	18	11	49	4.5	0	45	1,002	22.3	1	77	622	8.1	1

== Professional career ==
Pre-draft measurables
Height	Weight	Arm length	Hand span	Wingspan	40-yard dash	10-yard split	20-yard split	20-yard shuttle	Three-cone drill	Vertical jump	Broad jump	Bench press
5 ft 11 3/8 in (1.81 m)	175 lb (79 kg)	31 5/8 in (0.80 m)	9 in (0.23 m)	6 ft 2 in (1.88 m)	4.43 s	1.51 s	2.55 s	4.15 s	6.84 s	36.5 in (0.93 m)	10 ft 4 in (3.15 m)	13 reps
All values from NFL Combine/Pro Day

=== Cincinnati Bengals ===
Jones was selected by the Cincinnati Bengals in the fourth round, 131st overall, of the 2023 NFL draft.

==== 2023 ====
In the Bengals' Week 2 loss to the Baltimore Ravens, Jones would score his first NFL touchdown on an 81-yard punt return; this would also be the first touchdown of the Bengals' 2023 season. He suffered a thumb injury in Week 3 against the Los Angeles Rams and was placed on injured reserve on September 29, 2023. He was activated on November 16.

==== 2024 ====
Jones was named as the Bengals' main punt returner to begin the 2024 season. He was also listed as the team's second-string slot receiver behind Andrei Iosivas and the third-string kick returner behind Chase Brown and Trayveon Williams on the depth chart. He caught a five-yard pass in the Bengals' Week 1 loss to the New England Patriots. In Week 7 against the Browns, Jones had a 100-yard kick return for a touchdown on the opening kickoff in a 21–14 win, earning AFC Special Teams Player of the Week.

==== 2026 ====
On August 30, 2026, Jones was waived by the Bengals as a part of final roster cuts.

=== New York Giants ===
On September 1, 2026, Jones was signed to the New York Giants' practice squad. Jones reunites with his former offensive coordinator, Brian Callahan. On September 29, 2026, Jones was signed to the active roster. On November 16, he was waived and re-signed to the practice squad two days later.

== NFL career statistics ==
Legend
**Bold**	Career high

Year	Team	Games		Receiving						Rushing					Kick returns					Punt returns					Fumbles	
Year	Team	GP	GS	Tgt	Rec	Yds	Avg	Lng	TD	Att	Yds	Avg	Lng	TD	Ret	Yds	Avg	Lng	TD	Ret	Yds	Avg	Lng	TD	Fum	Lost
2023	CIN	11	0	**9**	**7**	**64**	**9.1**	**35**	0	**2**	**13**	**6.5**	**7**	0	–	–	–	–	–	**23**	**248**	**10.8**	**81**	**1**	0	0
2024	CIN	8	0	1	1	5	5.0	5	0	–	–	–	–	–	5	200	**40.0**	**100**	**1**	14	99	7.1	23	0	**2**	**1**
2025	CIN	14	0	1	0	0	0.0	0	0	–	–	–	–	–	**42**	**1,084**	25.8	98	**1**	13	115	8.8	23	0	0	0
Career		33	0	11	8	69	8.6	35	0	2	13	6.5	7	0	47	1,284	27.3	100	2	50	462	9.2	81	1	2	1
