= 2022 Purdue Boilermakers football team =

American college football season

2022 Purdue Boilermakers football

Big Ten West Division champion

Big Ten Championship Game, L 22–43 vs. Michigan

Citrus Bowl, L 7–63 vs. LSU
- Conference: Big Ten Conference
- West Division
- Record: 8–6 (6–3 Big Ten)
- Head coach: Jeff Brohm (6th season; regular season); Brian Brohm (bowl game)
- Offensive coordinator: Brian Brohm (6th season)
- Offensive scheme: Spread
- Co-defensive coordinators: Ron English (2nd season); Mark Hagen (2nd season)
- Base defense: 4–2–5 or 4–3
- Home stadium: Ross–Ade Stadium

2022 Big Ten Conference football standings
	Conf.			Overall
Team	W		L	W		L
East Division
No. 3 Michigan xy$^	9	–	0	13	–	1
No. 4 Ohio State ^	8	–	1	11	–	2
No. 7 Penn State	7	–	2	11	–	2
Maryland	4	–	5	8	–	5
Indiana	2	–	7	4	–	8
Rutgers	1	–	8	4	–	8
Michigan State†	0	–	6	0	–	7
West Division
Purdue xy	6	–	3	8	–	6
Illinois	5	–	4	8	–	5
Iowa	5	–	4	8	–	5
Minnesota	5	–	4	9	–	4
Wisconsin	4	–	5	7	–	6
Nebraska	3	–	6	4	–	8
Northwestern	1	–	8	1	–	11
Championship: Michigan 43, Purdue 22
^ – College Football Playoff participant; $ – Conference champion; x – Division champion/co-champions; y – Championship game participant; † — NCAA vacated all wins for Michigan State (5–7, 3–6); Rankings from AP Poll

The 2022 Purdue Boilermakers football team represented Purdue University in the West Division of the Big Ten Conference for the 2022 NCAA Division I FBS football season. Jeff Brohm was in his sixth and final season as the team's head coach before going to Louisville. Brohm announced his resignation on December 7, 2022, thus making Brian Brohm, Jeff's younger brother, the interim head coach for Purdue's game against LSU at the Citrus Bowl. Purdue represented the Big Ten West in the Big Ten Championship Game for the first time in school history against Michigan, thanks to an 8–4 season, 6–3 in Big Ten play, which placed them at the top of their division. In the Citrus Bowl, Purdue lost 63–7 with the absence of 4 players including starting quarterback, Aidan O’Connell, and star wide receiver, Charlie Jones. After the bowl, on December 13, 2022, the school named former Illinois defensive coordinator Ryan Walters the team's new head coach. At the time, Walters was the fourth youngest head football coach at the NCAA Division I FBS level. The Boilermakers played their home games at Ross–Ade Stadium in West Lafayette, Indiana.

== Offseason ==
=== Coaching changes ===
On January 5, 2022, Brad Lambert accepted a defensive coordinator position at Wake Forest. Two weeks later, cornerbacks coach James Adams followed Lambert to Wake Forest, while JaMarcus Shephard accepted an assistant coaching position at Washington. Assistant offensive line coach Neil Callaway also announced his retirement following the 2021 season.

To replace these coaches, former Western Kentucky head coach and recent Purdue quality control coach David Elson was hired as linebacker coach, former UAB coach Garrick McGee was brought in as wide receiver coach, and Ashton Youboty was hired as the cornerbacks coach. Ryan Wallace was also promoted to assistant offensive line coach.

=== Transfers ===
Outgoing

Notable departures from the 2021 squad included:

Name	Number	Pos.	Height	Weight	Year	Hometown	Notes
Jack Plummer	13	Quarterback	6'5"	212	Senior	Gilbert, Arizona	Transferred to California
Ja'Quez Cross	28	Running back	5'10"	170	Sophomore	Fordyce, Arkansas	Transferred to Arkansas State
Dontay Hunter II	91	Defensive end	6'5"	235	Junior	Westerville, Ohio	Transferred to Ohio
Bryce Austin	92	Defensive tackle	6'2"	285	Sophomore	Southfield, Michigan	Transferred to Western Michigan
Anthony Romphf	27	Cornerback	6'0"	180	Sophomore	Southfield, Michigan	Transferred to Western Michigan
Anthony Watts	8	Defensive linesman	6'4"	290	Senior	Houston, Texas	Transferred to Marshall
Elijah Ball	32	Cornerback	6'1"	190	Senior	Indianapolis, Indiana	Transferred to Eastern Illinois
Marvin Grant	4	Safety	6'2"	200	Junior	Detroit, Michigan	Transferred to Kansas

Incoming

Name	Number	Pos.	Height	Weight	Year	Hometown	Notes	Prev. School
Cole Brevard	91	Defensive line	6'3"	305	Sophomore	Carmel, Indiana	Transferred	Penn State
Elijah Canion	5	Wide receiver	6'2"	190	Sophomore	Hollywood, Florida	Transferred	Auburn
Charlie Jones	15	Wide receiver	6'0"	190	Senior	Deerfield, Illinois	Transferred	Iowa
Kobe Lewis	25	Running back	5'9"	175	Junior	Americus, Georgia	Transferred	Central Michigan
Reese Taylor	1	Cornerback	5'11"	190	Senior	Indianapolis, Indiana	Transferred	Indiana
Sione Finau	72	Offensive guard	6'3"	300	Junior	Keller, Texas	Committed	FIU
Tee Denson	11	Cornerback	6'0"	180	Sophomore	Ellenwood, Georgia	Transferred	Kansas State
Tyrone Tracy	3	Wide receiver	5'11"	195	Junior	Indianapolis, Indiana	Transferred	Iowa

== Preseason ==
=== Recruits ===
The Boilermakers signed a total of 19 recruits.

College recruiting information (2022)
Name	Hometown	School	Height	Weight	Commit date
Brady Allen; QB	Fort Branch, IN	Gibson Southern High School	6 ft 6 in (1.98 m)	200 lb (91 kg)	Jul 15, 2020
Brady Allen; QB	Recruit ratings: Scout: Rivals: 247Sports: ESPN:				
Joe Strickland; DE	Indianapolis, IN	Brebeuf Jesuit Preparatory School	6 ft 4 in (1.93 m)	250 lb (110 kg)	Jul 22, 2021
Joe Strickland; DE	Recruit ratings: Scout: Rivals: 247Sports: ESPN:				
Zion Steptoe; WR	Frisco, TX	Memorial High School	6 ft 0 in (1.83 m)	170 lb (77 kg)	Oct 7, 2021
Zion Steptoe; WR	Recruit ratings: Scout: Rivals: 247Sports: ESPN:				
Curtis Deville; WR	Iowa, LA	Iowa High School	6 ft 0 in (1.83 m)	180 lb (82 kg)	Jul 2, 2021
Curtis Deville; WR	Recruit ratings: Scout: Rivals: 247Sports: ESPN:				
Kentrell Marks; RB	Parma Heights, OH	Valley Forge High School	6 ft 1 in (1.85 m)	180 lb (82 kg)	Jun 27, 2021
Kentrell Marks; RB	Recruit ratings: Scout: Rivals: 247Sports: ESPN:				
Terence Thomas; WR	Youngstown, OH	Boardman High School	5 ft 11 in (1.80 m)	185 lb (84 kg)	Jun 25, 2021
Terence Thomas; WR	Recruit ratings: Scout: Rivals: 247Sports: ESPN:				
Roman Pitre	Baton Rouge, LA	University Laboratory School	6 ft 4 in (1.93 m)	220 lb (100 kg)	Jun 25, 2021
Roman Pitre	Recruit ratings: Scout: Rivals: 247Sports: ESPN:				
Charlie Kenrich; TE	Liberty Township, OH	Lakota East High School	6 ft 4 in (1.93 m)	220 lb (100 kg)	Jun 19, 2021
Charlie Kenrich; TE	Recruit ratings: Scout: Rivals: 247Sports: ESPN:				
Cross Watson; OT	Portage, MI	Portage Central High School	6 ft 5 in (1.96 m)	270 lb (120 kg)	Jun 14, 2021
Cross Watson; OT	Recruit ratings: Scout: Rivals: 247Sports: ESPN:				
Jordan Buchanan; S	Suwanee, GA	North Gwinnett High School	6 ft 0 in (1.83 m)	175 lb (79 kg)	Aug 26, 2021
Jordan Buchanan; S	Recruit ratings: Scout: Rivals: 247Sports: ESPN:				
Nic Caraway; DE	Bryan, TX	Bryan High School	6 ft 2 in (1.88 m)	235 lb (107 kg)	Jun 14, 2021
Nic Caraway; DE	Recruit ratings: Scout: Rivals: 247Sports: ESPN:				
Malachi Preciado; OC	New Orleans, LA	Warren Easton High School	6 ft 3 in (1.91 m)	280 lb (130 kg)	Jun 30, 2021
Malachi Preciado; OC	Recruit ratings: Scout: Rivals: 247Sports: ESPN:				
Andre Oben; OT	Jersey City, NJ	St. Peter's Prep	6 ft 4 in (1.93 m)	280 lb (130 kg)	Jun 27, 2021
Andre Oben; OT	Recruit ratings: Scout: Rivals: 247Sports: ESPN:				
Domanick Moon; LB	Fort Wayne, IN	R. Nelson Snider High School	6 ft 2 in (1.88 m)	220 lb (100 kg)	Dec 6, 2020
Domanick Moon; LB	Recruit ratings: Scout: Rivals: 247Sports: ESPN:				
JP Deeter; DT	Manvel, TX	Manvel High School	6 ft 4 in (1.93 m)	265 lb (120 kg)	Jun 27, 2021
JP Deeter; DT	Recruit ratings: Scout: Rivals: 247Sports: ESPN:				
Joseph Jefferson; S	Indianapolis, IN	Pike High School	6 ft 0 in (1.83 m)	190 lb (86 kg)	Dec 13, 2021
Joseph Jefferson; S	Recruit ratings: Scout: Rivals: 247Sports: ESPN:				
Marierre Omonode; DT	West Lafayette, IN	West Lafayette High School	6 ft 1 in (1.85 m)	265 lb (120 kg)	Nov 1, 2021
Marierre Omonode; DT	Recruit ratings: Scout: Rivals: 247Sports: ESPN:				
Vince Carpenter; OT	Red Bank, NJ	Red Bank Catholic High School	6 ft 6 in (1.98 m)	275 lb (125 kg)	Jun 27, 2021
Vince Carpenter; OT	Recruit ratings: Scout: Rivals: 247Sports: ESPN:				
Max Klare; TE	Cincinnati, OH	St. Xavier High School	6 ft 4 in (1.93 m)	225 lb (102 kg)	Dec 14, 2021
Max Klare; TE	Recruit ratings: Scout: Rivals: 247Sports: ESPN:				
Overall recruit ranking:
Note: In many cases, Scout, Rivals, 247Sports, On3, and ESPN may conflict in their listings of height and weight.; In these cases, the average was taken. ESPN grades are on a 100-point scale.; Sources: "Purdue Football Commitments". Rivals.; "ESPN". ESPN.; "2022 Team Ranking". Rivals.com.

== Schedule ==
The 2022 schedule consists of 6 home and 6 away games in the regular season.

2022 Purdue Boilermakers season results
Date	Time	Opponent	Site	TV	Result	Attendance
September 1	8:00 p.m.	Penn State	Ross–Ade Stadium; West Lafayette, IN (Big Noon Kickoff)	FOX	L 31–35	57,307
September 10	4:00 p.m.	Indiana State*	Ross–Ade Stadium; West Lafayette, IN	BTN	W 56–0	53,676
September 17	12:00 p.m.	at Syracuse*	JMA Wireless Dome; Syracuse, NY	ESPN2	L 29–32	35,493
September 24	7:30 p.m.	Florida Atlantic*^{†}	Ross–Ade Stadium; West Lafayette, IN	BTN	W 28–26	55,137
October 1	12:00 p.m.	at No. 21 Minnesota	Huntington Bank Stadium; Minneapolis, MN	ESPN2	W 20–10	48,288
October 8	12:00 p.m.	at Maryland	Maryland Stadium; College Park, MD	BTN	W 31–29	36,204
October 15	7:30 p.m.	Nebraska	Ross–Ade Stadium; West Lafayette, IN	BTN	W 43–37	61,320
October 22	3:30 p.m.	at Wisconsin	Camp Randall Stadium; Madison, WI	ESPN	L 24–35	75,822
November 5	12:00 p.m.	Iowa	Ross–Ade Stadium; West Lafayette, IN	FS1	L 3–24	61,320
November 12	12:00 p.m.	at No. 21 Illinois	Memorial Stadium; Champaign, IL (Purdue Cannon)	ESPN2	W 31–24	45,574
November 19	12:00 p.m.	Northwestern	Ross–Ade Stadium; West Lafayette, IN	FS1	W 17–9	54,016
November 26	3:30 p.m.	at Indiana	Memorial Stadium; Bloomington, IN (Old Oaken Bucket)	BTN	W 30–16	51,148
December 3	8:00 p.m.	vs. No. 2 Michigan	Lucas Oil Stadium; Indianapolis, IN (Big Ten Championship Game)	FOX	L 22–43	67,107
January 2, 2023	1:00 p.m.	vs. No. 17 LSU*	Camping World Stadium; Orlando, FL (Citrus Bowl)	ABC	L 7–63	42,791
*Non-conference game; ^{†}Homecoming; Rankings from AP Poll released prior to the game; All times are in Eastern time; Source:

== Game summaries ==
=== Penn State ===
Penn State Nittany Lions (0–0) at Purdue Boilermakers (0–0) – Game summary

Quarter	1	2	3	4	Total
Penn State	0	21	0	14	35
Purdue	3	7	14	7	31

at Ross–Ade Stadium, West Lafayette, Indiana

- Date: September 1
- Game time: 8:00 p.m. EDT
- Game weather: 79 °F (26 °C), sunny
- Game attendance: 57,307
- Referee: Ron Snodgrass
- TV announcers (FOX): Gus Johnson (play-by-play), Joel Klatt (analyst), and Jenny Taft (sideline)
- ESPN box score

Game information

First quarter

- PU – Mitchell Fineran, 36-yard field goal, 3:38 (3–0, PU)

Second quarter

- PSU – Mitchell Tinsley, 12-yard TD pass from Sean Clifford, Jake Pinegar kick, 13:09 (7–3, PSU)
- PU – King Doerue, 3-yard TD run, Fineran kick, 9:43 (10–7, PU)
- PSU – Clifford, 2-yard TD run, Pinegar kick, 1:44, (14–10, PSU)
- PSU – Brenton Strange, 67-yard TD pass from Clifford, Pinegar kick, 0:02 (21–10, PSU)

Third quarter

- PU – Doerue, 2-yard TD run, Fineran kick, 11:16 (21–17, PSU)
- PU – Charlie Jones, 7-yard TD pass from Aidan O'Connell, Fineran kick, 1:11 (24–21, PU)

Fourth quarter

- PSU – KeAndre Lambert-Smith, 29-yard TD pass from Clifford, Pinegar kick, 10:44 (28–24, PSU)
- PU – Chris Jefferson, 72-yard pass interception return for TD, Fineran kick, 8:29 (31–28, PU)
- PSU – Keyvone Lee, 10-yard TD pass from Clifford, Pinegar kick, 0:57 (35–31, PSU)

Statistics	PSU	PU
First downs	24	26
Plays–yards	73–406	81–426
Rushes–yards	32–98	23–70
Passing yards	308	365
Passing: comp–att–int	22–41–1	29–58–0
Time of possession	30:44	29:16

Team	Category	Player	Statistics
Penn State	Passing	Sean Clifford	20/37, 282 yards, 4 TD, 1 INT
Penn State	Rushing	Kaytron Allen	8 carries, 31 yards
Penn State	Receiving	Mitchell Tinsley	7 receptions, 84 yards, TD
Purdue	Passing	Aidan O'Connell	29/58, 356 yards, TD
Purdue	Rushing	King Doerue	15 carries, 57 yards, 2 TD
Purdue	Receiving	Charlie Jones	12 receptions, 153 yards, TD

=== Indiana State ===
	1	2	3	4	Total
Sycamores	0	0	0	0	0
Boilermakers	21	14	14	7	56

=== At Syracuse ===
	1	2	3	4	Total
Boilermakers	6	3	0	20	29
Orange	3	0	7	22	32

=== Florida Atlantic ===
	1	2	3	4	Total
Owls	0	13	7	6	26
Boilermakers	7	7	7	7	28

=== At No. 21 Minnesota ===
	1	2	3	4	Total
Boilermakers	10	0	0	10	20
No. 21 Golden Gophers	0	3	7	0	10

=== At Maryland ===
Purdue Boilermakers (3-2) at Maryland Terrapins (4-1) - Game summary

Quarter	1	2	3	4	Total
Boilermakers	3	14	0	14	31
Terrapins	7	10	0	12	29

at SECU Stadium • College Park, MD

- Date: October 8
- Game time: 12:00 p.m. EST/9:00 a.m. PST
- Game weather: Sunny • Temperature: 63 °F (17 °C) • Wind: 8 mph SE
- Game attendance: 36,204
- Referee: Reggie Smith
- TV announcers (BTN): Lisa Byington (play-by-play), Anthony Herron (analyst), and Meghan McKeown (sideline)

Game information

First quarter

- 10:31 MD - Taulia Tagovailoa 9-yard run (Chad Ryland kick) - 7-0 Maryland, Drive: 6 plays, 69 yards, 2:24
- 4:50 PUR - Mitchell Fineran 39-yard field goal - 7-3 Maryland, Drive: 12 plays, 53 yards, 5:41

Second quarter

- 14:04 PUR - Dylan Downing 1-yard run (Mitchell Fineran kick) - 10-7 Purdue, Drive: 11 plays, 65 yards, 4:48
- 10:22 MD - Chad Ryland 46-yard field goal - 10-10, Drive: 8 plays, 52 yards, 3:35
- 6:16 PUR - Mershawn Rice 4-yard pass from Aidan O'Connell (Mitchell Fineran kick) - 17-10 Purdue, Drive: 10 plays, 75 yards, 4:06
- 0:14 MD - Corey Dyches 68-yard pass from Taulia Tagovailoa (Chad Ryland kick) - 17-17, Drive: 1 play, 53 yards, 0:27

Fourth quarter

- 7:47 MD - Roman Hemby 11-yard pass from Taulia Tagovailoa (Chad Ryland kick blocked) - 23-17 Maryland, Drive: 12 plays, 69 yards, 4:19
- 3:19 PUR - Payne Durham 4-yard pass from Aidan O'Connell (Mitchell Fineran kick) - 24-23 Purdue, Drive: 10 plays, 66 yards, 4:21
- 1:20 PUR - Devin Mockobee 1-yard run (Mitchell Fineran kick) - 31-23 Purdue, Drive: 5 plays, 60 yards, 1:10
- 0:35 MD - Corey Dyches 18-yard pass from Taulia Tagovailoa (Taulia Tagovailoa two-point pass incomplete) - 31-29 Purdue, Drive: 4 plays, 68 yards, 0:37

Statistics	Purdue	Maryland
First downs	23	18
Plays–yards	75–373	63–387
Rushes–yards	34–13	25–72
Passing yards	360	315
Passing: comp–att–int	30–41–1	26–38–1
Time of possession	32:11	27:49

Team	Category	Player	Statistics
Purdue	Passing	Aidan O'Connell	30/41, 360 yards, 2 TD, 1 INT
Purdue	Rushing	Devin Mockobee	13 carries, 29 yards, 1 TD
Purdue	Receiving	Payne Durham	7 receptions, 109 yards, 1 TD
Maryland	Passing	Taulia Tagovailoa	26/38, 315 yards, 3 TD, 1 INT
Maryland	Rushing	Antwain Littleton II	6 carries, 30 yards
Maryland	Receiving	Corey Dyches	4 receptions, 106 yards, 2 TD

=== Nebraska ===
Nebraska Cornhuskers (3–3) at Purdue Boilermakers (4–2) – Game summary

Quarter	1	2	3	4	Total
Cornhuskers	0	13	17	7	37
Boilermakers	10	17	7	9	43

at Ross-Ade Stadium • West Lafayette, IN

- Date: October 15, 2022
- Game time: 7:30 p.m. EST
- Game weather: Cloudy, 52 °F (11 °C)
- Game attendance: 61,320
- Referee: Michael Canon
- TV announcers (BTN): Cory Provus (play-by-play), Matt Millen (analyst), and Elise Menaker (sideline)

Game information

First quarter

- (5:54) PUR – T. J. Sheffield 2-yard pass from Aidan O'Connell, Mitchell Fineran kick (Drive: 9 plays, 80 yards, 3:40; Purdue 7–0)
- (1:09) PUR – Mitchell Fineran 37-yard field goal (Drive: 9 plays, 38 yards, 3:00; Purdue 10–0)

Second quarter

- (13:16) NEB – Jaquez Yant 1-yard run, Timmy Bleekrode kick (Drive: 8 plays, 76 yards, 2:49; Purdue 10–7)
- (9:01) NEB – Timmy Bleekrode 36-yard field goal (Drive: 6 plays, 43 yards, 2:10; Tied 10–10)
- (5:49) PUR – Charlie Jones 31-yard pass from Aidan O'Connell, Mitchell Fineran kick (Drive: 7 plays, 75 yards, 3:12; Purdue 17–10)
- (4:44) PUR– Mitchell Fineran 37-yard field goal (Drive: 4 plays, 5 yards, 0:46; Purdue 20–10)
- (0:35) PUR – Devin Mockobee 1-yard run, Mitchell Fineran kick (Drive: 7 plays, 39 yards, 2:13; Purdue 27–10)
- (0:00) NEB – Timmy Bleekrode 43-yard field goal (Drive: 5 plays, 50 yards, 0:35; Purdue 27–13)

Third quarter

- (13:51) NEB – Trey Palmer 37-yard pass from Casey Thompson, Timmy Bleekrode kick (Drive: 4 plays, 71 yards, 1:04; Purdue 27–20)
- (5:17) NEB – Timmy Bleekrode 22-yard field goal (Drive: 6 plays, 72 yards, 1:05; Purdue 27–23)
- (2:18) PUR – T. J. Sheffield 28-yard pass from Aidan O'Connell, Mitchell Fineran kick (Drive: 6 plays, 75 yards, 2:59; Purdue 34–23)
- (1:46) NEB – Trey Palmer 72-yard pass from Casey Thompson, Timmy Bleekrode kick (Drive: 2 plays, 75 yards, 0:32; Purdue 34–30)

Fourth quarter

- (10:00) PUR – Mitchell Fineran 34-yard field goal (Drive: 15 plays, 72 yards, 6:41; Purdue 37–30)
- (6:55) PUR – Charlie Jones 2-yard from Aidan O'Connell (Drive: 6 plays, 62 yards, 2:08; Purdue 43–30)
- (5:55) NEB – Anthony Grant 1-yard run, Timmy Bleekrode kick (Drive: 3 plays, 70 yards, 0:55; Purdue 43–37)

Statistics	NEB	PUR
First downs	15	38
Total yards	476	608
Rushes/yards	23–122	47–217
Passing yards	354	391
Passing: Comp–Att–Int	16–29–2	35–54–1
Time of possession	17:18	42:42

Team	Category	Player	Statistics
Nebraska	Passing	Casey Thompson	16/29, 354 yards, 2 TD, 2 INT
Nebraska	Rushing	Trey Palmer	1 carry, 60 yards
Nebraska	Receiving	Trey Palmer	7 receptions, 237 yards, 2 TD
Purdue	Passing	Aidan O'Connell	35/54, 391 yards, 4 TD, INT
Purdue	Rushing	Devin Mockobee	30 carries, 178 yards, TD
Purdue	Receiving	Charlie Jones	12 receptions, 132 yards, 2 TD

=== At Wisconsin ===
Purdue Boilermakers (5–2) vs. Wisconsin Badgers (3–4) – Game summary

Quarter	1	2	3	4	Total
Boilermakers	0	3	7	14	24
Badgers	21	0	14	0	35

at Camp Randall Stadium, Madison, Wisconsin

- Date: October 22, 2022
- Game time: 2:30 p.m.
- Game weather: 74 °F (23 °C) • Wind: S at 15 miles per hour (24 km/h) • Weather: Cloudy
- Game attendance: 75,018
- Referee: Ron Snodgrass
- TV announcers (ESPN): Bob Wischusen (play-by-play), Dan Orlovsky (analyst), and Kris Budden (sideline)

Game information

First quarter

- WIS – Skyler Bell 29-yard pass from Graham Mertz (Nate Van Zelst Kick), 12:34 Wisconsin 7–0, Drive: 6 plays, 76 yards, 2:26
- WIS – John Torchio 31-yard interception return (Nate Van Zelst Kick), 11:16 Wisconsin 14–0
- WIS – Chimere Dike 3-yard pass from Graham Mertz (Nate Van Zelst Kick), 2:38 Wisconsin 21–0, Drive: 8 plays, 80 yards, 3:59

Second quarter

- PUR – Mitchell Fineran 36-yard field goal, 3:49. Wisconsin 21–3. Drive: 13 plays, 71 yards, 5:14.

Third quarter

- WIS – Braelon Allen 14-yard run (Nate Van Zelst Kick), 14:08 Wisconsin 28–3, Drive: 2 plays, 14 yards, 0:12
- PUR – Payne Durham 8-yard pass from Aidan O'Connell (Mitchell Fineran Kick), 4:12 Wisconsin 28–10, Drive: 4 plays, 21 yards, 1:55
- WIS – Isaac Guerendo 54-yard run (Nate Van Zelst Kick), 2:42 Wisconsin 35–10, Drive: 4 plays, 75 yards, 1:30

Fourth quarter

- PUR – Devin Mockobee 1-yard run (Mitchell Fineran Kick), 12:05 Wisconsin 35–17, Drive: 12 plays, 81 yards, 2:55
- PUR – Aidan O'Connell 1-yard run (Mitchell Fineran Kick), 1:24 Wisconsin 35–24, Drive: 9 plays, 87 yards, 2:23

Top passers

- PUR – Aidan O'Connell – 31/46, 320 yards, TD, 3 INT
- WIS – Graham Mertz – 13/21, 203 yards, 2 TD

Top rushers

- PUR – Devin Mockobee – 23 carries, 108 yards, TD
- WIS – Braelon Allen – 16 carries, 113 yards, TD

Top receivers

- PUR – Charlie Jones – 10 receptions, 105 yards
- WIS – Skyler Bell – 4 receptions, 87 yards, TD

Top defenders

- PUR – Semisi Fakasiieiki – 7 tackles, TFL
- WIS – John Torchio – 10 tackles, 2 INT, pass breakup

=== Iowa ===
Iowa at Purdue

Team	1	2	3	4	Total
• Hawkeyes	0	17	7	0	24
Boilermakers	0	3	0	0	3

- Date: November 5
- Location:
  Ross–Ade Stadium
  West Lafayette, IN
- Game start: 12:04 p.m. EDT
- Elapsed time: 3:12
- Game attendance: 61,320
- Game weather: 63 °F (17 °C), Cloudy, Wind S 21 mph (34 km/h)
- Referee: Reggie Smith
- TV announcers (FS1): Eric Collins (play-by-play) and Devin Gardner (analyst)

Scoring summary
2	14:23	Iowa	Sam LaPorta 16-yard pass from Spencer Petras (Drew Stevens kick)	Iowa 7–0
2	12:53	Iowa	Nico Ragaini 29-yard pass from Spencer Petras (Drew Stevens kick)	Iowa 14–0
2	6:11	Iowa	Drew Stevens 26-yard field goal	Iowa 17–0
2	1:40	Purdue	Mitchell Fineran 34-yard field goal	Iowa 17–3
3	14:43	Iowa	Kaleb Johnson 75-yard run (Drew Stevens kick)	Iowa 24–3

Purdue had won four of the previous five in this series, but the Hawkeye defense held the Boilermaker offense 190 yards and 30 points below their averages. Entering the game, Purdue hadn't scored fewer than 20 points in a game this season, and it was the first time Purdue didn't score an offensive touchdown at home since 2013. Freshman running back Kaleb Johnson had 22 carries for 200 yards that included a 75-yard TD run, earning him B1G Offensive Player of the Week and B1G Freshman of the Week honors.

Statistics	IOWA	PUR
First downs	15	17
Total yards	376	255
Rushing yards	184	87
Passing yards	192	168
Turnovers	0	2
Time of possession	28:02	31:58

Team	Category	Player	Statistics
Iowa	Passing	Spencer Petras	13–23, 192 yards, 2 TD
Iowa	Rushing	Kaleb Johnson	22 carries, 200 yards, TD
Iowa	Receiving	Sam LaPorta	3 receptions, 71 yards, TD
Purdue	Passing	Aidan O'Connell	20–43, 168 yards, 2 INT
Purdue	Rushing	Devin Mockobee	14 carries, 65 yards
Purdue	Receiving	Charlie Jones	11 receptions, 104 yards

=== At No. 21 Illinois ===
	1	2	3	4	Total
Boilermakers	0	14	7	10	31
No. 21 Fighting Illini	7	7	7	3	24

=== Northwestern ===
	1	2	3	4	Total
Wildcats	0	3	0	6	9
Boilermakers	7	7	0	3	17

=== At Indiana ===
	1	2	3	4	Total
Boilermakers	3	0	14	13	30
Hoosiers	7	0	0	9	16

=== Vs. No. 2 Michigan (Big Ten Championship) ===
No. 2 Michigan vs. Purdue
(Big Ten Championship Game)

Team	1	2	3	4	Total
Boilermakers	7	6	3	6	22
• No. 2 Wolverines	7	7	14	15	43

- Date: December 3
- Location: Lucas Oil Stadium
  Indianapolis, IN
- Game start: 8:17 p.m. EST
- Elapsed time: 3:42
- Game attendance: 67,107
- Game weather: Indoors
- Referee: Jerry McGinn
- TV announcers (FOX): Gus Johnson, Joel Klatt, and Allison Williams

Scoring summary
1	9:11	MICH	Colston Loveland 25-yard pass from J. J. McCarthy (Jake Moody kick)	MICH 7–0
1	4:13	PUR	Devin Mockobee 1-yard run (Mitchell Fineran kick)	Tied 7–7
2	13:39	PUR	Mitchell Fineran 33-yard field goal	PUR 10–7
2	7:05	MICH	Luke Schoonmaker 7-yard pass from J. J. McCarthy (Jake Moody kick)	MICH 14–10
2	1:27	PUR	Mitchell Fineran 45-yard field goal	MICH 14–13
3	12:25	MICH	Kalel Mullings 1-yard run (Jake Moody kick)	MICH 21–13
3	10:32	MICH	Donovan Edwards 27-yard run (Jake Moody kick)	MICH 28–13
3	3:37	PUR	Mitchell Fineran 43-yard field goal	MICH 28–16
4	12:37	PUR	Mitchell Fineran 27-yard field goal	MICH 28–19
4	9:06	MICH	Ronnie Bell 17-yard pass from J.J. McCarthy (J. J. McCarthy–Luke Schoonmaker pass)	MICH 36–19
4	5:07	PUR	Mitchell Fineran 32-yard field goal	MICH 36–22
4	1:22	MICH	Kalel Mullings 3-yard run (Jake Moody kick)	MICH 43–22

Statistics	PU	No. 2 UM
First downs	27	17
Plays–yards	84–456	55–386
Rushes–yards	37–90	38–225
Passing yards	366	161
Passing: comp–att–int	32–47–2	11–17–1
Time of possession	33:42	26:18

Team	Category	Player	Statistics
Purdue	Passing	Aidan O'Connell	32/47, 366 yards, 2 INT
Purdue	Rushing	Devin Mockobee	17 carries, 71 yards, 1 TD
Purdue	Receiving	Charlie Jones	13 receptions, 162 yards
No. 2 Michigan	Passing	J. J. McCarthy	11/17, 161 yards, 3 TD, 1 INT
No. 2 Michigan	Rushing	Donovan Edwards	25 carries, 185 yards, 1 TD
No. 2 Michigan	Receiving	Ronnie Bell	5 receptions, 67 yards, 1 TD

=== Vs. No. 17 LSU (Citrus Bowl) ===
Purdue Boilermakers vs. No. 17 LSU Tigers (Cheez-It Citrus Bowl) – Game summary

Quarter	1	2	3	4	Total
No. 17 LSU	14	21	14	14	63
Purdue	0	0	0	7	7

at Camping World Stadium • Orlando, Florida

- Date: Monday, January 2, 2023
- Game time: 1:00 p.m. EST
- Game weather: Sunny • Temperature: 79 °F (26 °C) • Wind: 4 mph (6.4 km/h) east
- Game attendance: 42,791
- Referee: Kevin Mar
- TV announcers (ABC/ESPN Radio): Bob Wischusen (play-by-play), Dan Orlovsky (analyst), and Kris Budden (sideline)/Mike Couzens (play-by-play), Max Starks (analyst), and Chris Doering (sideline)
- Box score

Scoring summary

Quarter	Time	Drive			Team	Scoring information	Score	
Quarter	Time	Plays	Yards	TOP	Team	Scoring information	LSU	Purdue
1	7:01	10	63	4:46	LSU	John Emery Jr. 1-yard touchdown run, Damian Ramos kick good	7	0
1	1:06	8	67	3:14	LSU	Noah Cain 9-yard touchdown run, Damian Ramos kick good	14	0
2	13:03	5	62	2:05	LSU	Mason Taylor 32-yard touchdown reception from Jayden Daniels, Damian Ramos kick good	21	0
2	8:23	5	70	1:28	LSU	Noah Cain 9-yard touchdown run, Damian Ramos kick good	28	0
2	1:07	5	87	2:04	LSU	Brian Thomas Jr. 10-yard touchdown reception from Garrett Nussmeier, Damian Ramos kick good	35	0
3	9:21	9	45	3:04	LSU	Jayden Daniels 5-yard touchdown reception from Malik Nabers, Damian Ramos kick good	42	0
3	3:15	1	75	0:10	LSU	Malik Nabers 75-yard touchdown reception from Garrett Nussmeier, Damian Ramos kick good	49	0
4	13:53	9	75	4:22	Purdue	TJ Sheffield 16-yard touchdown reception from Michael Alaimo, Mitchell Fineran kick good	49	7
4	8:47	7	55	2:58	LSU	Derrick Davis Jr. 12-yard touchdown run, Ezekeal Mata kick good	56	7
4	0:40				LSU	Interception returned 99 yards for touchdown by Quad Wilson, Trey Finison kick good	63	7
"TOP" = time of possession. For other American football terms, see Glossary of American football.							63	7

== Rankings ==
Ranking movements Legend: ██ Increase in ranking ██ Decrease in ranking — = Not ranked RV = Received votes
	Week															
Poll	Pre	1	2	3	4	5	6	7	8	9	10	11	12	13	14	Final
AP	RV	RV	RV	—	—	RV	RV	RV	—	—	—	—	RV	RV	RV	RV
Coaches	RV	—	—	—	—	RV	RV	RV	—	—	—	—	RV	RV	RV	RV
CFP	Not released									—	—	—	—	—	—	Not released

== Roster ==
2022 Purdue Boilermakers football team roster
Players
Coaches
Offense

Pos.	#	Name	Class
QB	1	Michael Alaimo	RSo
WR	2	Abdur-Rahmaan Yaseen	RSo
WR	3	Tyrone Tracy	RJr
WR	4	Deion Burks	So
WR	5	Elijah Canion (injured)	So
WR	6	Curtis Deville, Jr.	Fr
WR	8	TJ Sheffield	Jr
WR	9	Mershawn Rice	Jr
QB	11	Jack Albers	Jr
QB	12	Austin Burton	GS
WR	13	Broc Thompson (injured)	Sr
WR	15	Charlie Jones	RSr
QB	16	Aidan O'Connell	GS
QB	17	Christian Gelov	RSo
QB	18	Brady Allen	Fr
QB	20	Kyle Adams	RSo
RB	22	King Doerue	Sr
RB	25	Kobe Lewis	RJr
WR	26	Andrew Sowinski	RSo
WR	27	Trey Firestone	Fr
RB	29	Kentrell Marks	Fr
TE	33	Charlie Kenrich	Fr
WR	34	Ben Van Noord	So
WR	35	Hayden Parise	So
RB	37	Caleb Lahey	RSo
RB	38	Dylan Downing	RSo
RB	39	Will Chapman	Jr
RB	45	Devin Mockobee	So
RB	52	Zac Tuinei	RSo
OL	53	Gus Hartwig	Jr
OL	54	Josh Kaltenberger	RSo
OL	55	Malachi Preciado	Fr
OL	59	Vince Carpenter	Fr
OL	61	Aaron Roberts	So
OL	62	Ben Kuhns	Jr
OL	63	Marcus Mbow	So
OL	64	Mahamane Moussa	So
OL	68	Cam Craig (injured)	Jr
OL	70	Zach Richards	So
OL	71	Nalin Fox	RSo
OL	72	Sione Finau	Jr
OL	73	Daniel Johnson (injured)	RSr
OL	74	Eric Miller	Sr
OL	75	Spencer Holstege	Jr
OL	76	Andre Oben	Fr
OL, DL	77	DJ Washington	GS
OL	78	Cross Watson	Fr
OL	79	Jared Bycznski	RSo
WR	80	Camdyn Childers	Jr
WR	81	Collin Sullivan	RSo
TE	82	Drew Biber	So
WR	83	Zion Steptoe	Fr
WR	84	Preston Terrell	So
WR	85	Alex Maxwell	RSo
TE	86	Max Klare	Fr
TE	87	Payne Durham	Sr
TE	88	Garrett Miller (injured)	Jr
TE	89	Paul Piferi	Jr
TE	91	Ben Buechel	RSo

Defense

Pos.	#	Name	Class
CB	0	Bryce Hampton	Jr
DB	1	Reese Taylor	RSr
DE	5	Nic Caraway	Fr
LB, S	6	Jalen Graham	Sr
CB	7	Jamari Brown	Sr
DE	9	Joe Strickland	Fr
S	10	Cam Allen	Sr
CB	11	Tee Denson (injured)	So
S	12	Jah’von Grigsby	So
LB, DE	14	Yanni Karlaftis	RFr
S	17	Chris Jefferson (injured)	GS
CB	19	Jordan Buchanan	Fr
LB	20	OC Brothers	Jr
S	21	Sanoussi Kane	Jr
CB	23	Cory Trice	Sr
CB	26	Brandon Calloway	So
S	28	Ryan Brandt	Jr
S	32	Joseph Jefferson II	Fr
CB	33	Xander Pratt	Fr
DT	34	Damarjhe Lewis (injured)	RSo
S	35	Antonio Stevens	Jr
LB	36	Roman Pitre	Fr
LB	37	Jacob Wahlberg	Jr
LB	40	Hudson Miller	Fr
LB	41	Ben Furtney	RSo
LB	42	Clyde Washington	Jr
LB	43	Kieren Douglas	GS
DE	44	Kydran Jenkins	RSo
LB	46	Scotty Humpich	RSr
LB	47	Domanick Moon	Fr
LB	48	Tristan Cox	So
LB	49	Farrell Henderson III	Fr
DE	50	Sulaiman Kpaka	Jr
LB	54	Ben Kreul	RSo
DE	56	Jayden Scruggs	Fr
DT	58	Branson Deen	Sr
DT	90	Lawrence Johnson	Sr
DT	91	Cole Brevard	RSo
DT	92	Mo Omonode	Fr
DT	93	PrinceJames Boyd Jr.	RSo
DT	94	J.P. Deeter	Fr
DE	95	Joe Anderson	Jr
DE	96	Khordae Sydnor	So
LB	97	Semisi Fakasiieiki	Fr
DT	98	Greg Hudgins III	RSo
DE	99	Jack Sullivan	Sr

Special teams

Pos.	#	Name	Class
K	24	Mitchell Fineran	GS
P	30	Jack Ansell	So
LS	31	Nick Zecchino	GS
K	39	Ben Freehill	Jr
K	41	Caleb Krockover	RSo
K	45	Julio Macias	Fr
P	47	Brendan Cropsey	RSo
LS	51	Nick Taylor	RSo
K	57	Chris Van Eekeren	Jr

Head coach

- Jeff Brohm

Coordinators/assistant coaches

- Brian Brohm (offensive coordinator/quarterbacks)
- Ron English (co-defensive coordinator/secondary)
- Mark Hagen (co-defensive coordinator/defensive line)
- Chris Barclay (running backs)
- David Elson (linebackers)
- Karl Maslowski (special teams/assistant linebackers)
- Garrick McGee (wide receivers)
- Dale Williams (offensive line/tight ends)
- Ryan Wallace (Tight Ends/Assistant Offensive Line)
- Ashton Youboty (cornerbacks)
- Greg Brohm (executive director of football administration and operations / chief of staff)
- JMichael Jonard (quality control)
- Domenic Reno (director of Football Strength and Conditioning)
- Brandon Reyes (assistant director of football strength and conditioning)

Legend

- (C) Team captain
- (S) Suspended
- (I) Ineligible
- Injured
- Redshirt

Roster
Last update: August 4, 2022

Wide receiver Milton Wright was ruled academically ineligible for the 2022 season.

=== 2022 NFL draft ===
Boilermakers who were picked in the 2022 NFL Draft:

Round	Pick	Player	Position	Team
1	30	George Karlaftis	DE	Kansas City Chiefs
3	99	David Bell	WR	Cleveland Browns
7	260	Zander Horvath	FB	Los Angeles Chargers
Undrafted		DaMarcus Mitchell	LB/DE	New England Patriots
Undrafted		Jaylan Alexander	LB	Chicago Bears

== Awards and honors ==
=== Award watch lists ===
Listed in the order that they were released

Award	Player	Position	Year	Date Awarded	Ref
Maxwell Award	Aidan O'Connell	QB	GS	July 18, 2022	
Davey O'Brien Award	Aidan O'Connell	QB	GS	July 19, 2022	
John Mackey Award	Payne Durham	TE	SR	July 22, 2022	
Rimington Trophy	Gus Hartwig	OL	JR	July 22, 2022	
Lou Groza Award	Mitchell Fineran	K	GS	July 27. 2022	
Paul Hornung Award	Charlie Jones	WR	SR	July 28, 2022	
Wuerffel Trophy	Aidan O'Connell	QB	GS	July 28, 2022	
Walter Camp Award	Aidan O'Connell	QB	GS	July 29, 2022	
Earl Campbell Tyler Rose Award	King Doerue	RB	SR	August 10, 2022	
Polynesian College Football; Player Of The Year Award	Semisi Fakasiieiki	LB	GS	August 18, 2022	
Polynesian College Football; Player Of The Year Award	Sione Finau	OL	SR	August 18, 2022	
Manning Award	Aidan O'Connell	QB	GS	August 22, 2022	
Johnny Unitas Golden Arm Award	Aidan O'Connell	QB	GS	August 24, 2022	
Fred Biletnikoff Award	Charlie Jones	WR	SR	October 5, 2022	

=== Weekly Awards ===
Weekly Awards
Player	Award	Date Awarded	Ref.
Cam Allen	Big Ten Defensive Player of the Week	October 3, 2021	
Aidan O'Connell	Big Ten Co-offensive Player of the Week	October 17, 2021	
Devin Mockobee	Big Ten Freshman of the Week	October 17, 2021	
Devin Mockobee	Big Ten Co-Freshman of the Week	November 28, 2022	

=== All-Conference Honors ===
All-Conference Honors
Player	Position	Coaches	Media
Charlie Jones	WR	1st Team	1st Team
Charlie Jones	KR	HM	HM
Payne Durham	TE	2nd Team	2nd Team
Aidan O'Connell	QB	2nd Team	3rd Team
Devin Mockobee	RB	HM	HM
Cory Trice	CB	HM	HM
Jack Sullivan	DE	HM	HM
Jalen Graham	LB	HM	HM
Branson Deen	DT	HM	
Kydran Jenkins	DE	HM	
Gus Hartwig	OL		HM
Marcus Mbow	OL		HM
Spencer Holstege	OL		HM
Cam Allen	S		HM
Lawrence Johnson	DT		HM
