= 2022 Illinois Fighting Illini football team =

American college football season

2022 Illinois Fighting Illini football

ReliaQuest Bowl, L 10–19 vs. Mississippi State
- Conference: Big Ten Conference
- Record: 8–5 (5–4 Big Ten)
- Head coach: Bret Bielema (2nd season)
- Offensive coordinator: Barry Lunney Jr. (1st season)
- Offensive scheme: Spread
- Defensive coordinator: Ryan Walters (2nd season)
- Base defense: 4–3
- Home stadium: Memorial Stadium

2022 Big Ten Conference football standings
	Conf.			Overall
Team	W		L	W		L
East Division
No. 3 Michigan xy$^	9	–	0	13	–	1
No. 4 Ohio State ^	8	–	1	11	–	2
No. 7 Penn State	7	–	2	11	–	2
Maryland	4	–	5	8	–	5
Indiana	2	–	7	4	–	8
Rutgers	1	–	8	4	–	8
Michigan State†	0	–	6	0	–	7
West Division
Purdue xy	6	–	3	8	–	6
Illinois	5	–	4	8	–	5
Iowa	5	–	4	8	–	5
Minnesota	5	–	4	9	–	4
Wisconsin	4	–	5	7	–	6
Nebraska	3	–	6	4	–	8
Northwestern	1	–	8	1	–	11
Championship: Michigan 43, Purdue 22
^ – College Football Playoff participant; $ – Conference champion; x – Division champion/co-champions; y – Championship game participant; † — NCAA vacated all wins for Michigan State (5–7, 3–6); Rankings from AP Poll

The 2022 Illinois Fighting Illini football team was an American football team that represented the University of Illinois Urbana-Champaign as a member of the Big Ten Conference during the 2022 NCAA Division I FBS football season. In their second season under head coach Bret Bielema, the Fighting Illini compiled an 8–5 record (5–4 in conference games), tied for second place in the Big Ten's West Division, and outscored opponents by a total of 315 to 166.

Junior running back Chase Brown led the team in rushing (1,643 rushing yards on 328 carries) and scoring (13 touchdowns, 78 points scored). He also had 27 receptions for 240 yards. The team's other statistical leaders included senior quarterback Tommy DeVito (2,650 passing yards, 69.6% completion percentage), wide receiver Isaiah Williams (82 receptions for 715 yards), and linebacker Isaac Darkangelo (71 total tackles). Defensive back Devon Witherspoon was a consensus All-American, and offensive lineman Alex Palczewski won first-team honors from The Sporting News. For the first time since 2011, the Fighting Illini were ranked in the Top 25, which they were ranked in Week 6. On October 29, the Illini clinched a winning record for the first time since 2011.

The team played its home games at Memorial Stadium in Champaign, Illinois.

== Schedule ==
Illinois announced its 2022 football schedule on January 12, 2022. The 2022 schedule consists of seven home games and five away games in the regular season. The Fighting Illini will host Big Ten foes Iowa, Minnesota, Michigan State, and Purdue and will travel to Indiana, Wisconsin, Nebraska, Michigan and Northwestern. The Fighting Illini will host all three of their non-conference opponents, Wyoming from the Mountain West, Virginia from ACC, and Chattanooga from Division I FCS.

Date	Time	Opponent	Rank	Site	TV	Result	Attendance
August 27	3:00 p.m.	Wyoming*		Memorial Stadium; Champaign, IL	BTN	W 38–6	37,832
September 2	7:00 p.m.	at Indiana		Memorial Stadium; Bloomington, IN (rivalry)	FS1	L 20–23	44,357
September 10	3:00 p.m.	Virginia*		Memorial Stadium; Champaign, IL	ESPNU	W 24–3	33,669
September 22	7:30 p.m.	No. 10 (FCS) Chattanooga*		Memorial Stadium; Champaign, IL	BTN	W 31–0	37,579
October 1	11:00 a.m.	at Wisconsin		Camp Randall Stadium; Madison, WI	BTN	W 34–10	73,502
October 8	6:30 p.m.	Iowa		Memorial Stadium; Champaign, IL	BTN	W 9–6	44,910
October 15	11:00 a.m.	Minnesota^{†}	No. 24	Memorial Stadium; Champaign, IL	BTN	W 26–14	45,683
October 29	2:30 p.m.	at Nebraska	No. 17	Memorial Stadium; Lincoln, NE	ABC	W 26–9	86,691
November 5	3:30 p.m.	Michigan State	No. 16	Memorial Stadium; Champaign, IL	BTN	L 15–23	56,092
November 12	11:00 a.m.	Purdue	No. 21	Memorial Stadium; Champaign, IL (rivalry)	ESPN2	L 24–31	45,574
November 19	11:00 a.m.	at No. 3 Michigan		Michigan Stadium; Ann Arbor, MI (rivalry)	ABC	L 17–19	110,433
November 26	2:30 p.m.	at Northwestern		Ryan Field; Evanston, IL (rivalry)	BTN	W 41–3	25,744
January 2, 2023	11:00 a.m.	vs. No. 22 Mississippi State*		Raymond James Stadium; Tampa, FL (ReliaQuest Bowl)	ESPN2	L 10–19	35,797
*Non-conference game; ^{†}Homecoming; Rankings from AP Poll released prior to the game; All times are in Central time

== Game summaries ==
=== Wyoming ===
	1	2	3	4	Total
Cowboys	3	0	3	0	6
Fighting Illini	7	10	7	14	38

=== At Indiana ===
	1	2	3	4	Total
Fighting Illini	7	3	7	3	20
Hoosiers	3	13	0	7	23

=== Virginia ===
	1	2	3	4	Total
Cavaliers	3	0	0	0	3
Fighting Illini	14	7	3	0	24

=== No. 10 (FCS) Chattanooga ===
	1	2	3	4	Total
No. 10 (FCS) Mocs	0	0	0	0	0
Fighting Illini	10	14	7	0	31

=== At Wisconsin ===
Illinois vs. Wisconsin – Game summary

Quarter	1	2	3	4	Total
Fighting Illini	7	7	17	3	34
Badgers	7	3	0	0	10

at Camp Randall Stadium, Madison, Wisconsin

- Date: October 1, 2022
- Game time: 11:00 a.m.
- Game weather: 58 °F (14 °C) • Wind: NE at 5 miles per hour (8.0 km/h) • Weather: Sunny
- Game attendance: 73,502
- Referee: Jerry Servinski
- TV announcers (BTN): Lisa Byington (play-by-play), Anthony Herron (analyst), and Krystle Rich (sideline)

Game information

First quarter

- WIS – Isaac Guerendo 21-yard pass from Graham Mertz (Nate Van Zelst Kick), 11:15 Wisconsin 7–0, Drive: 7 plays, 53 yards, 3:39
- ILL – Tommy DeVito 1-yard run (Caleb Griffin Kick), 4:30 Tie 7–7, Drive: 7 plays, 16 yards, 3:39

Second quarter

- WIS – Nate Van Zelst 39-yard field goal, 14:53. Wisconsin 10–7. Drive: 10 plays, 45 yards, 4:32.
- ILL – Tommy DeVito 1-yard run (Caleb Griffin Kick), 7:31 Illinois 14–10, Drive: 6 plays, 47 yards, 2:48

Third quarter

- ILL – Tommy DeVito 1-yard run (Caleb Griffin Kick), 10:24 Illinois 21–10, Drive: 10 plays, 75 yards, 4:36
- ILL – Caleb Griffin 44-yard field goal, 9:03. Illinois 24–10. Drive: 4 plays, -10 yards, 1:18.
- ILL – Chase Brown 49-yard run (Caleb Griffin Kick), 6:42 Illinois 31–10, Drive: 4 plays, 70 yards, 1:14

Fourth quarter

- ILL – Caleb Griffin 31-yard field goal, 14:18. Illinois 34–10. Drive: 9 plays, 40 yards, 5:18.

Top passers

- ILL – Tommy DeVito – 18/24, 167 yards
- WIS – Graham Mertz – 17/32, 206 yards TD, 2 INT

Top rushers

- ILL – Chase Brown – 25 carries, 129 yards, TD
- WIS – Chez Mellusi – 7 carries, 16 yards

Top receivers

- ILL – Brian Hightower – 5 receptions, 59 yards
- WIS – Chimere Dike – 5 receptions, 76 yards

Top defenders

- ILL – Quan Martin – 7 tackles, TFL, sack, pass breakup
- WIS – Keeanu Benton – 3 tackles, 2 TFL, 2 sacks

=== Iowa ===
Iowa at Illinois

Team	1	2	3	4	Total
Hawkeyes	3	3	0	0	6
• Fighting Illini	3	3	0	3	9

- Date: October 8
- Location:
  Memorial Stadium
  Champaign, IL
- Game start: 6:40 pm CDT
- Game attendance: 44,910
- Game weather: 56 °F (13 °C), Sunny, Wind SW 8 mph (13 km/h)
- Referee: Greg Blum
- TV announcers (BTN): Cory Provus (play-by-play), Jake Butt (analyst), and Elise Menaker (sideline)
- Source: Box Score

Scoring summary
1	9:03	Illinois	F. Pinton 27-yard field goal	Illinois 3–0
1	3:51	Iowa	Drew Stevens 32-yard field goal	Tied 3–3
2	8:00	Illinois	F. Pinton 37-yard field goal	Illinois 6–3
2	2:48	Iowa	Drew Stevens 27-yard field goal	Tied 6–6
4	2:49	Illinois	F. Pinton 36-yard field goal	Illinois 9–6

Illinois won for the first time in nine tries in the series since the two teams became part of the Big Ten West. It was also former Iowa player and coach Bret Bielema's first game at Illinois against Iowa, as he missed the 2021 meeting due to issues relating to COVID-19.

Statistics	IOWA	ILL
First downs	13	18
Total yards	221	316
Rushing yards	52	200
Passing yards	169	116
Turnovers	1	3
Time of possession	28:55	31:05

Team	Category	Player	Statistics
Iowa	Passing	Spencer Petras	18/36, 169 yards, INT
Iowa	Rushing	Leshon Williams	7 carries, 32 yards
Iowa	Receiving	Sam LaPorta	9 receptions, 100 yards
Illinois	Passing	Artur Sitkowski	13/19, 74 yards, INT
Illinois	Rushing	Chase Brown	31 carries, 146 yards
Illinois	Receiving	Brian Hightower	5 receptions, 68 yards

=== Minnesota ===
	1	2	3	4	Total
Golden Gophers	0	7	7	0	14
No. 24 Fighting Illini	7	6	7	6	26

=== At Nebraska ===
No. 17 Illinois Fighting Illini (6–1) vs Nebraska Cornhuskers (3–4) – Game summary

Quarter	1	2	3	4	Total
No. 17 Fighting Illini	6	14	3	3	26
Cornhuskers	3	6	0	0	9

at Memorial Stadium • Lincoln, NE

- Date: October 29, 2022
- Game time: 2:30 p.m.
- Game weather: Sunny, 70 °F (21 °C)
- Game attendance: 86,691
- Referee: Greg Blum
- TV announcers (ABC): Dave Pasch (play-by-play), Dusty Dvoracek (analyst), and Tom Luginbill (sideline)

Game information

First quarter

- (12:33) ILL – Isaiah Williams 46-yard pass from Tommy DeVito (Drive: 5 plays, 75 yards, 2:27; Illinois 6–0)
- (1:49) NEB – Timmy Bleekrode 26-yard field goal (Drive: 9 plays, 73 yards, 3:15; Illinois 6–3)

Second quarter

- (9:38) NEB – Travis Vokolek 56-yard pass from Casey Thompson (Drive: 5 plays, 93 yards, 2:24; Nebraska 9–6)
- (6:03) ILL – Chase Brown 1-yard run, Caleb Griffin kick (Drive: 2 plays, 11 yards, 0:28; Illinois 13–9)
- (0:23) ILL – Chase Brown 12-yard pass from Tommy DeVito, Caleb Griffin kick (Drive: 11 plays, 72 yards, 4:08; Illinois 20–9)

Third quarter

- (3:29) ILL – Caleb Griffin 36-yard field goal (Drive: 13 plays, 70 yards, 7:27; Illinois 23–9)

Fourth quarter

- (11:12) ILL – Caleb Griffin 41-yard field goal (Drive: 4 plays, 2 yards, 2:00; Illinois 26–9)

Statistics	ILL	NEB
First downs	18	9
Total yards	367	248
Rushes/yards	48–188	25–60
Passing yards	179	188
Passing: Comp–Att–Int	20–22–0	11–24–3
Time of possession	38:13	21:47

Team	Category	Player	Statistics
Illinois	Passing	Tommy DeVito	20/22, 179 yards, 2 TD
Illinois	Rushing	Chase Brown	32 carries, 149 yards, TD
Illinois	Receiving	Isaiah Williams	9 receptions, 93 yards, TD
Nebraska	Passing	Casey Thompson	7/15, 172 yards, TD, 2 INT
Nebraska	Rushing	Anthony Grant	12 carries, 61 yards
Nebraska	Receiving	Travis Vokolek	1 reception, 56 yards, TD

=== Michigan State ===
Week Nine: Michigan State at No. 16 Illinois– Game summary

Quarter	1	2	3	4	Total
Michigan State	3	6	14	0	23
No. 16 Illinois	7	0	0	8	15

at Memorial Stadium • Champaign, IL

- Date: November 5, 2022
- Game time: 3:40 p.m.
- Game weather: 58 °F (14 °C), Cloudy, Wind: SW 30 mph (48 km/h)
- Game attendance: 56,092
- Referee: Larry Smith
- TV announcers (BTN): Cory Provus (play-by-play), Matt Millen (analyst), and Elise Menaker (sideline)

Game information

First Quarter

- (08:03) ILL TD: Isaiah Williams 60-yard pass from Tommy DeVito (Caleb Griffin kick)
  ILL 7–0; 2 plays, 59 yards, 0:42
- (01:36) MSU FG: Ben Patton 21-yard field goal
  ILL 7–3; 15 plays, 72 yards, 6:27

Second Quarter

- (10:21) MSU TD: Tre Mosley 1-yard pass from Payton Thorned (kick failed)
  MSU 9–7; 7 plays 61 yards, 3:48

Third Quarter

- (05:45) MSU TD: Jarek Broussard 11-yard run (Ben Patton kick)
  MSU 16–7; 6 plays, 29 yards, 3:48
- (05:27) MSU TD: Jayden Reed 16-yard pass from Payton Thorne (Ben Patton kick)
  MSU 23–7; 3 plays 41 yards, 1:22

Fourth Quarter

- (14:27) ILL TD: Isaiah Williams 7-yard pass from Tommy DeVito (Tip Redmon pass from Tommy DeVito)
  MSU 23–15; 8 plays, 56 yards, 3:25

Passing

- MSU – Payton Thorne: 19/29, 182 yards, 2 TD, 1 INT
- ILL – Tommy DeVito: 25/37, 288 yards, 2 TD

Rushing

- MSU – Jalen Berger: 15 carries, 84 yards
- ILL – Chase Brown: 33 carries, 140 yards

Receiving

- MSU – Jayden Reed: 5 receptions, 68 yards, 1 TD
- ILL – Isaiah Williams: 5 receptions, 98 yards, 2 TD

=== Purdue ===
	1	2	3	4	Total
Boilermakers	0	14	7	10	31
No. 21 Fighting Illini	7	7	7	3	24

=== At No. 3 Michigan ===
Illinois at No. 3 Michigan
(rivalry)

Team	1	2	3	4	Total
Fighting Illini	0	3	14	0	17
• No. 3 Wolverines	7	0	3	9	19

- Date: November 19
- Location: Michigan Stadium
  Ann Arbor, MI
- Game start: 12:07 p.m. EST
- Elapsed time: 3:29
- Game attendance: 110,433
- Game weather: 25 °F (−4 °C), sunny, SW 15 MPH
- Referee: Michael Cannon
- TV announcers (ABC): Sean McDonough (play-by-play), Todd Blackledge (analyst), Molly McGrath, and Todd McShay (sidelines)

Scoring summary
1	11:28	MICH	Blake Corum 2-yard run (Jake Moody kick)	MICH 7–0
2	4:03	ILL	Caleb Griffin 29-yard field goal	MICH 7–3
3	11:10	MICH	Jake Moody 46-yard field goal	MICH 10–3
3	7:43	ILL	Chase Brown 8-yard run (Caleb Griffin kick)	Tied 10–10
3	1:36	ILL	Chase Brown 37-yard run (Caleb Griffin kick)	ILL 17–10
4	12:31	MICH	Jake Moody 41-yard field goal	ILL 17–13
4	3:14	MICH	Jake Moody 33-yard field goal	ILL 17–16
4	0:09	MICH	Jake Moody 35-yard field goal	MICH 19–17

Statistics	UI	No. 3 UM
First downs	20	18
Plays–yards	64–326	74–376
Rushes–yards	34–148	40–168
Passing yards	178	208
Passing: comp–att–int	21–30–0	18–34–0
Turnovers		
Time of possession	24:57	35:03

Team	Category	Player	Statistics
Illinois	Passing	Tommy DeVito	21/30, 178 yards
Illinois	Rushing	Chase Brown	29 carries, 140 yards, 2 TD
Illinois	Receiving	Casey Washington	6 receptions, 53 yards
No. 3 Michigan	Passing	J. J. McCarthy	18/34, 208 yards
No. 3 Michigan	Rushing	Blake Corum	18 carries, 108 yards, 1 TD
No. 3 Michigan	Receiving	Colston Loveland	3 receptions, 50 yards

=== At Northwestern ===
	1	2	3	4	Total
Fighting Illini	7	10	17	7	41
Wildcats	0	0	0	3	3

=== Vs. No. 22 Mississippi State (ReliaQuest Bowl) ===
No. 22 Mississippi State Bulldogs vs. Illinois Fighting Illini (ReliaQuest Bowl)

Quarter	1	2	3	4	Total
No. 22 Mississippi State	0	3	0	16	19
Illinois	0	7	3	0	10

at Raymond James Stadium • Tampa, Florida

- Date: Monday, January 2, 2023
- Game time: 12:00 p.m. EST
- Game weather: Sunny • Temperature: 76 °F (24 °C) • Wind: 6 mph (9.7 km/h) west
- Game attendance: 35,797
- TV announcers (ESPN2/Bowl Season Radio): Dave Flemming (play-by-play), Rod Gilmore (analyst), and Tiffany Blackmon (sideline)/Bill Roth (play-by-play), Hans Olsen (analyst), and Despina Barton (sideline)
- Box score

Scoring summary

Quarter	Time	Drive			Team	Scoring information	Score	
Quarter	Time	Plays	Yards	TOP	Team	Scoring information	Mississippi State	Illinois
2	2:49	10	77	4:45	Illinois	Tommy DeVito 2-yard touchdown run, Caleb Griffin kick good	0	7
2	0:09	8	55	2:40	Miss. State	38-yard field goal by Massimo Biscardi	3	7
3	6:57	11	45	5:13	Illinois	52-yard field goal by Caleb Griffin	3	10
4	14:54	13	75	7:03	Miss. State	Justin Robinson 8-yard touchdown reception from Will Rogers, Massimo Biscardi kick good	10	10
4	0:04	9	68	1:46	Miss. State	27-yard field goal by Massimo Biscardi	13	10
4	0:00				Miss. State	Fumble recovery returned 60 yards for touchdown by Marcus Banks, kick not attempted	19	10
"TOP" = time of possession. For other American football terms, see Glossary of American football.							19	10

== Rankings ==
Ranking movements Legend: ██ Increase in ranking ██ Decrease in ranking — = Not ranked RV = Received votes
	Week															
Poll	Pre	1	2	3	4	5	6	7	8	9	10	11	12	13	14	Final
AP	—	—	—	—	—	RV	24	18	17	14	21	RV	RV	RV	RV	RV
Coaches	—	—	—	—	—	RV	RV	20	18	13	20	RV	RV	RV	RV	—
CFP	Not released									16	21	—	—	—	—	Not released

== Roster ==
2022 Illinois Fighting Illini football team roster
Players
Coaches
Offense

Pos.	#	Name	Class
RB	0	Josh McCray	So
WR	1	Isaiah Williams	So
RB	2	Chase Brown	Jr
QB	3	Tommy DeVito	Sr
WR	4	Khmari Thompson	Jr
WR	6	Ashton Hollins	Fr
WR	7	Brian Hightower	Jr
WR	8	Shawn Miller (injured)	Fr
QB	9	Artur Sitkowski	Jr
QB	10	Donovan Leary (injured)	Fr
QB	11	Jake Huber	Fr
WR	11	Jonah Morris	Sr
QB	12	Kirkland Michaux	Fr
WR	13	Pat Bryant	So
WR	14	Casey Washington	Jr
QB	15	Jameson Sheehan	Fr
QB	17	Ryan Johnson	Sr
WR	18	Chase Miller	Fr
WR	19	Eian Pugh	Fr
TE	20	Naivyan Cargill	Fr
RB	21	Aidan Laughery	Fr
RB	22	Chase Hayden	Sr
RB	23	Reggie Love III	So
RB	24	Nick Fedanzo	So
RB	25	Jordan Anderson	Fr
TE	40	Lucas Althaus	Fr
TE	42	Michael Marchese	Sr
TE	43	Griffin Moore	So
TE	44	Ben Clawson	Fr
TE	48	Mike Cernigila Jr	So
OL	53	Devin Hale	Fr
OL	54	Julian Pearl	So
OL	56	Magnus MØller	Fr
OL	57	Evan Kirts	So
OL	58	Matt Fries	Fr
OL	62	Sam Tsagalis	Fr
OL	63	Alex Palczewski	Sr
OL	64	Josh Kreutz	Fr
OL	65	Joey Okla	Fr
OL	66	Jordyn Slaughter	Jr
OL	68	Zachary Barlev	Fr
OL	70	Tommy Cronin	So
OL	71	Hunter Whitenack	Fr
OL	72	Zy Crisler	So
OL	73	Josh Gesky	Fr
OL	74	Dylan Davis	So
OL	75	Alex Pihlstrom	Sr
OL	76	Clayton Leonard	Fr
OL	78	Isaiah Adams	Jr
OL	79	Luciano Elias	Fr
WR	80	Hank Beatty	Fr
WR	81	Daniel Edwards	Fr
TE	82	Luke Ford	Sr
WR	83	Keion Battle	Fr
TE	84	Owen Anderson	Fr
WR	85	Miles Scott	Sr
WR	86	Weston Adams	Fr
WR	87	Kody Case	Sr
TE	88	Henry Boyer	Fr
TE	89	Tip Reiman	So
WR		Tyler McClure	Fr

Defense

Pos.	#	Name	Class
DB	1	Kionte Curry	Fr
DB	2	Matthew Bailey	Fr
DB	3	DD Snyder II	Fr
DL	4	Johnny Newton	So
LB	5	Calvin Hart Jr	Jr
DB	6	Terrell Jennings	Jr
DB	7	Kendall Smith	Sr
LB	8	Tarique Barnes	Jr
DB	9	Tyson Rooks	Fr
DB	10	Tahveon Nicholson	So
DB	12	Elijah Mc-Cantos	Fr
DB	14	Xavier Scott	Fr
DB	15	Prince Green	Fr
DB	16	Peyton Vining	Sr
LB	17	Gabe Jacas	Fr
DB	20	Tyler Strain	Fr
DB	21	Quan Martin	Sr
DL	23	Terah Edwards	Fr
LB	25	Jared Badie	Fr
DB	26	Mike Manning	So
DB	27	Matt Bobak	Fr
LB	28	Dylan Rosiek	Fr
DB	29	TJ Griffin	Fr
DB	30	Sydney Brown	Sr
DB	31	Devon Witherspoon	Jr
DB	32	Tailon Leitzsey	Sr
LB	33	Ezekiel Holmes (injured)	Jr
LB	34	Ryan Meed	So
DB	35	Grayson Griffin	Fr
LB	36	Ben Schultz	So
DB	37	Solo Turner	So
LB	38	Isaac Darkangelo	Sr
LB	39	Kenenna Odeluga	Fr
LB	40	Shammond Cooper	So
LB	41	James Kruetz	Fr
LB	42	Luke Zardzin	Fr
LB	45	Malachi Hood	Fr
LB	48	Bryce Barnes	Jr
LB	49	Seth Coleman	So
DL	52	Verdis Brown	Jr
DL	55	Sed McConnell	Fr
DL	57	Evan Kirts	So
DL	88	Keith Randolph Jr.	So
LB	90	Alec Bryant	Fr
DL	91	Jamal Woods	Sr
DL	93	Calvin Avery	Sr
DL	94	Raashaan Wilkins Jr	Jr
LB	98	Deon Pate	Sr
DL	99	Christian Lorenzo	Sr

Special teams

Pos.	#	Name	Class
K	5	Caleb Griffin	Jr
K	16	Will McManus	Fr
K, P	98	Fabrizio Pinton	Fr
P	19	Hugh Robertson	Fr
P	96	Josh Leff	Fr
LS	36	Lane Hansen	Fr
LS	39	Aidan Hall	So
LS	47	Preston Engel	Jr
LS	95	Nico Crawford	Fr

Head coach

- Bret Bielema

Coordinators/assistant coaches

- Barry Lunney Jr. – Offensive Coordinator / Quarterbacks
- Ryan Walters – Defensive Coordinator
- Ben Miller – Special Teams Coordinator/Tight Ends
- Cory Patterson – Running Backs
- Terrance Jamison – Defensive Line
- George McDonald – Wide Receivers / Assistant HC
- Aaron Henry – Defensive Backs
- Bart Miller – Offensive Line
- Andy Buh – Linebackers
- Kevin Kane – Outside linebackers / Associate HC
- Sean Snyder - Special Teams/Specialists

Legend

- (C) Team captain
- (S) Suspended
- (I) Ineligible
- Injured
- Redshirt

Roster
Last update: September 21, 2021

== Coaching staff ==
Name	Position	Consecutive season at Illinois in current position
Bret Bielema	Head coach	2nd
Ryan Walters	Defensive coordinator	2nd
Barry Lunney Jr.	Offensive coordinator/quarterbacks coach	1st
George McDonald	Wide receivers Coach / assistant head coach	2nd
Kevin Kane	Outside linebackers Coach / associate head coach	2nd
Bart Miller	Offensive line coach	2nd
Andy Buh	Linebackers coach	2nd
Terrance Jamison	Defensive line coach	2nd
Aaron Henry	Defensive backs coach	2nd
Ben Miller	Tight ends coach/special teams coordinator	2nd
Cory Patterson	Running backs coach	5th
