= Big Ten Football Championship Game =

College football game held by the Big Ten Conference

- Sport: Football
- Conference: Big Ten Conference
- Current stadium: Lucas Oil Stadium
- Current location: Indianapolis, Indiana
- Played: 2011–2026
- Last contest: 2025
- Current champion: Indiana
- Most championships: Ohio State (5)
- TV partner: Fox (2011–2023, 2025–2026) (Note: CBS had planned to enter a four-year rotation period with Fox for the game beginning in 2027, with Fox broadcasting the game in odd-numbered years and CBS broadcasting in even-numbered years, but this was scrapped as part of the game being discontinued after 2026.)

Sponsors
- Dr Pepper (2011–2016); Discover Card (2017–current)

The Big Ten Football Championship Game is a college football game held by the Big Ten Conference each year to determine the conference's season champion. The game, held after the regular season has been completed, currently matches the top two teams in the conference standings. It is typically held the first Saturday of December, although in 2020 it was played on the third Saturday of December due to the COVID-19 pandemic. Lucas Oil Stadium in Indianapolis, Indiana has been the site of the championship game since its inception in 2011 and was scheduled to host through 2028, but this was cut short after the College Football Playoff's expansion to 24 teams in 2027 forced the game to be discontinued following its 2026 edition. Since 2017, the game's official title has been the Big Ten College Football Championship Game Presented by Discover Card following a sponsorship deal with Discover Financial.

The winner of this game is the Big Ten Champion. The winning team also receives the Stagg Championship Trophy, while the most valuable player of the game receives the Grange–Griffin Championship Game Most Valuable Player Trophy. Through the 2025 game, Ohio State has the most appearances and wins in the game with seven and five, respectively. In 2026, ESPN and the NCAA made an agreement to make a 24 team playoff, officially ending the Big Ten championship.

== History ==
Prior to the 2011 college football season, the Big Ten Conference determined its conference representative through regular season play, and, as there were only 11 member schools, there was no possibility for a conference championship game because, at the time, the NCAA required that a conference have 12 teams with two divisions in order to hold a conference championship game.

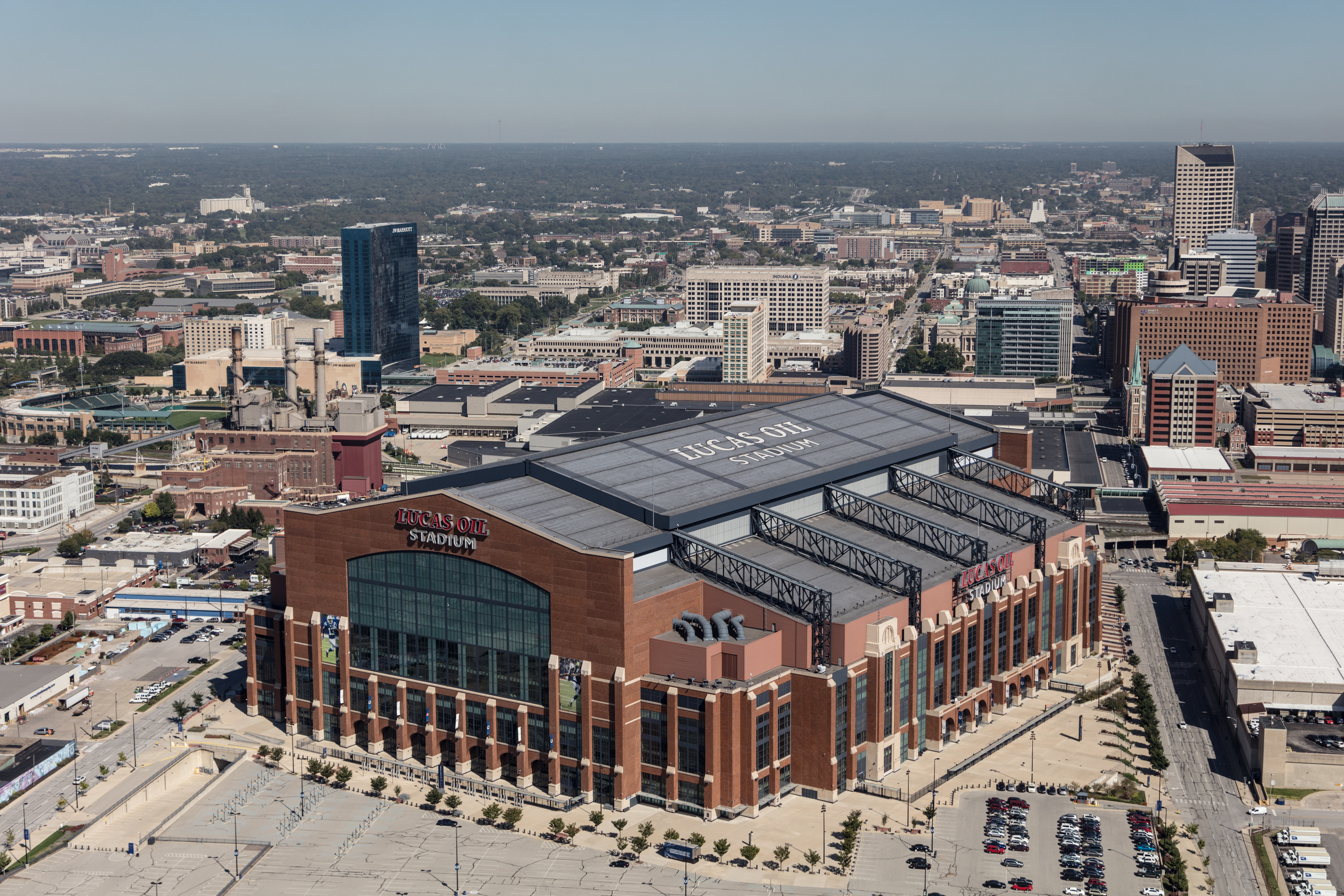
Lucas Oil Stadium

In 2010, the Big Ten Conference added the University of Nebraska, bringing the membership total to 12 teams. Thus, the conference was able to meet NCAA requirements. On August 5, 2010, Big Ten Conference Commissioner James Delany announced that Lucas Oil Stadium in Indianapolis, Indiana had been chosen as the possible site for the inaugural championship game. The league office began a 30-day period to negotiate a one-year agreement with Indiana Sports Corp and Lucas Oil Stadium to host the game. Delany also announced that once the 2011 agreement was in place, the conference office would conduct a thorough process over the next year to determine the location of the Big Ten Football Championship Game in 2012 and beyond.

On November 17, 2010, the Big Ten Conference announced a media agreement with Fox Sports to serve as the official broadcast partner for the 2011–2016 Big Ten Football Championship Games. A source at the time stated that the six-year agreement with Fox Sports would be worth between $20–$25 million per season, making it one of the most valuable conference championship games in college football. In the league's press release, it was confirmed that the 2011 event would take place at Lucas Oil Stadium in prime time. Because Fox is a majority partner in the Big Ten Network, this may allow for the possibility of more involvement by the Big Ten Network in the event, including the use of Big Ten Network staff in the game coverage. Commissioner Delany also stated at that time that the Big Ten would strongly consider rotating the site of the game, mentioning other possible host cities such as Chicago, Detroit, Minneapolis, Green Bay, and Cleveland.

On June 5, 2014, the Big Ten Conference announced via press release that the Big Ten Football Championship game would continue to be held at Lucas Oil Stadium through the 2024 season.

As part of the College Football Playoff's expansion to 24 teams beginning in 2027, the Big Ten Football Championship game will be discontinued following its 2026 edition, alongside the football championship games of the ACC, Big 12, and SEC. The regular season leader in the Big Ten will once again be crowned conference champion and awarded an automatic spot in the playoff beginning in 2027.

== Conference expansion ==
The Big Ten expanded to 11 schools by adding Penn State in 1990, but this did not yet meet the NCAA's requirements for holding a conference championship game (that the conference have 12 teams with two divisions). A few other times during that period, there were talks between the Big Ten and other schools (namely, Kansas, Missouri, and Rutgers, and later Notre Dame) which might have led to the possibility of a conference with two divisions of at least six teams and a conference championship, but for various reasons, nothing came to fruition.

It was not until December 2009, when Commissioner Delany announced that the league would explore the possibility of adding one or more institutions, that the wheels were set in motion that would lead to the Big Ten adding a school for the first time in 20 years. Less than a year later, on June 11, 2010, Nebraska applied for membership and was unanimously accepted by the conference's 11 member schools. Its membership became effective on July 1, 2011.

In November 2012, the Big Ten announced that Maryland and Rutgers would join the conference in 2014, which brought conference membership up to 14 schools.

The Big Ten expanded further in 2024, first announcing in 2022 that UCLA and USC would join in 2024 and then announcing the next year that Oregon and Washington would join alongside UCLA and USC.

== Team selection ==
– East division
– West division
– Championship Game site

Through the 2023 edition, the participating teams in the game were the first place teams from each of the conference's two divisions. Starting in 2024, the game featured the top two teams in the conference standings.

After the addition of Nebraska to the conference, there was much debate over what would be the best division of the 12 schools. Some felt that it would be best to maintain geographical divisions. Others felt that geography should only be a factor insofar as there was competitive balance between the two divisions. Another very important factor for Big Ten schools was the maintenance of long-standing rivalries that the schools held with each other.

On September 1, 2010, Commissioner Delany revealed how the teams would be placed into the two divisions. On December 13, Commissioner Delany announced that the two divisions would be called Legends and Leaders. The scheduling arrangement for the schools was that they would face each of the other schools in their division, plus three crossover opponents, one of which would be permanent. The permanent crossover opponent would be used to ensure that long standing historical rivalries would continue.

On August 4, 2011, the Big Ten Conference announced that there would be a nine-game conference schedule beginning in 2017, allowing schools to play four crossover opponents. However, the Big Ten and Pac-12 later announced a multi-sport scheduling agreement that provides for each member school to play one non-conference football game per year against an opponent from the other conference, and with this announcement, the Big Ten backed away from the nine-game conference schedule proposal.

Following the 2014 entry of Maryland and Rutgers, the "Leaders" and "Legends" divisions were set aside and replaced by geographic divisions, with the schools in the Central Time Zone plus Purdue forming the new West Division, and the remaining members forming the East Division. In addition, the conference adopted a nine-game schedule beginning in 2016.

In December 2020, the Big Ten Conference waived the six-game minimum requirement for a team to participate in the championship game; Ohio State, which had a 5–0 record after playing a limited schedule impacted by the COVID-19 pandemic in the United States, would otherwise have been ineligible to participate. The Big Ten stated, "The decision was based on a competitive analysis which determined that Ohio State would have advanced to the Big Ten Football Championship Game based on its undefeated record and head-to-head victory over Indiana regardless of a win or loss against Michigan."

With the conference expanding to 18 teams in 2024 with the arrival of Oregon, UCLA, USC, and Washington, the divisions were eliminated effective at that time.

== Results ==
Year	Legends Division		Leaders Division		Site	Attendance	Network	Viewers (millions)	TV rating	MVP
2011	11 Michigan State	39	15 Wisconsin	42	Lucas Oil Stadium; Indianapolis, IN	64,152	Fox	7.8	4.6	QB Russell Wilson, Wisconsin
2012	14 Nebraska	31	Wisconsin (Note: Both first place Ohio State and second place Penn State received postseason bans, thus third place Wisconsin represented the Leaders Division.)	70	Lucas Oil Stadium; Indianapolis, IN	41,260	Fox	4.9	3.0	RB Montee Ball, Wisconsin
2013	10 Michigan State	34	2 Ohio State	24	Lucas Oil Stadium; Indianapolis, IN	66,002	Fox	13.9	7.9	QB Connor Cook, Michigan State
Year	East Division		West Division		Site	Attendance	Network	Viewers (millions)	TV rating	MVP
2014	5 Ohio State	59	13 Wisconsin	0	Lucas Oil Stadium; Indianapolis, IN	60,229	Fox	6.1	3.5	QB Cardale Jones, Ohio State
2015	5 Michigan State	16	4 Iowa	13	Lucas Oil Stadium; Indianapolis, IN	68,228	Fox	9.8	5.7	QB Connor Cook, Michigan State
2016	7 Penn State	38	6 Wisconsin	31	Lucas Oil Stadium; Indianapolis, IN	65,018	Fox	9.2	5.2	QB Trace McSorley, Penn State
2017	8 Ohio State	27	4 Wisconsin	21	Lucas Oil Stadium; Indianapolis, IN	65,886	Fox	12.9	7.3	RB J. K. Dobbins, Ohio State
2018	6 Ohio State	45	21 Northwestern	24	Lucas Oil Stadium; Indianapolis, IN	66,375	Fox	8.7	5.0	QB Dwayne Haskins, Ohio State
2019	1 Ohio State	34	8 Wisconsin	21	Lucas Oil Stadium; Indianapolis, IN	66,649	Fox	13.6	3.6	QB Justin Fields, Ohio State
2020	4 Ohio State	22	14 Northwestern	10	Lucas Oil Stadium; Indianapolis, IN	3,178‡	Fox	8.0	4.7	RB Trey Sermon, Ohio State
2021	2 Michigan	42	13 Iowa	3	Lucas Oil Stadium; Indianapolis, IN	67,183	Fox	11.7	6.2	DE Aidan Hutchinson, Michigan
2022	2 Michigan	43	Purdue	22	Lucas Oil Stadium; Indianapolis, IN	67,107	Fox	10.7	5.5	RB Donovan Edwards, Michigan
2023	2 Michigan	26	16 Iowa	0	Lucas Oil Stadium; Indianapolis, IN	67,842	Fox	10.0	5.1	DB Mike Sainristil, Michigan
Year	No. 1 seed		No. 2 seed		Site	Attendance	Network	Viewers (millions)	TV rating	MVP
2024	1 Oregon	45	3 Penn State	37	Lucas Oil Stadium; Indianapolis, IN	67,469	CBS	10.5	5.2	WR Tez Johnson, Oregon
2025	1 Ohio State	10	2 Indiana	13	Lucas Oil Stadium; Indianapolis, IN	68,214	Fox	18.3	8.6	QB Fernando Mendoza, Indiana
2026					Lucas Oil Stadium; Indianapolis, IN		Fox			

- 2011–2013 rankings from the AP Poll released prior to the game.
- 2014–present rankings from College Football Playoff Poll released prior to the game.
- ‡ 2020 game attendance capped due to the COVID-19 pandemic.

=== Results by team ===
Appearances	Team	Wins	Losses	Year(s) won	Year(s) lost
7	Ohio State	5	2	2014, 2017, 2018, 2019, 2020	2013, 2025
6	Wisconsin	2	4	2011, 2012	2014, 2016, 2017, 2019
3	Michigan	3	0	2021, 2022, 2023	
3	Michigan State	2	1	2013, 2015	2011
3	Iowa	0	3		2015, 2021, 2023
2	Penn State	1	1	2016	2024
2	Northwestern	0	2		2018, 2020
1	Oregon	1	0	2024	
1	Indiana	1	0	2025	
1	Nebraska	0	1		2012
1	Purdue	0	1		2022
0	Illinois	0	0		
0	Maryland	0	0		
0	Minnesota	0	0		
0	Rutgers	0	0		
0	UCLA	0	0		
0	USC	0	0		
0	Washington	0	0		

=== Rematches ===
The Big Ten Football Championship game has featured a rematch of a regular-season game a total of three times (2011, 2012, 2019). The team which won the regular-season game is 1–2 in the rematches, losing in 2011 and 2012 but winning in 2019.

=== No results by team ===
- Illinois, Maryland, Minnesota, Rutgers, UCLA, USC, and Washington have yet to make an appearance in a Big Ten Football Championship Game.

=== Common matchups ===
Matchups that have occurred more than once:

# of Times	Matchup	Record	Years played
3	Ohio State vs. Wisconsin	Ohio State, 3–0	2014, 2017, 2019
2	Ohio State vs. Northwestern	Ohio State, 2–0	2018, 2020
2	Michigan vs. Iowa	Michigan, 2–0	2021, 2023

== Media coverage ==
=== Television ===
Year	Network	Play-by-play	Color commentator(s)	Sideline reporter(s)
2011	Fox	Gus Johnson	Charles Davis	Tim Brewster and Dhani Jones
2012	Fox	Gus Johnson	Charles Davis	Julie Alexandria
2013	Fox	Gus Johnson	Charles Davis	Erin Andrews and Kristina Pink
2014	Fox	Gus Johnson	Charles Davis	Molly McGrath
2015	Fox	Gus Johnson	Joel Klatt	Molly McGrath
2016	Fox	Gus Johnson	Joel Klatt	Shannon Spake
2017	Fox	Gus Johnson	Joel Klatt	Jenny Taft
2018	Fox	Gus Johnson	Joel Klatt	Jenny Taft
2019	Fox	Gus Johnson	Joel Klatt	Jenny Taft
2020	Fox	Gus Johnson	Joel Klatt	Jenny Taft
2021	Fox	Gus Johnson	Joel Klatt	Jenny Taft
2022	Fox	Gus Johnson	Joel Klatt	Allison Williams
2023	Fox	Gus Johnson	Joel Klatt	Jenny Taft
2024	CBS	Brad Nessler	Gary Danielson	Jenny Dell
2025	Fox	Gus Johnson	Joel Klatt	Jenny Taft and Tom Rinaldi

=== Radio ===
Year	Network	Play-by-play	Color commentator(s)
2013	Compass Media Networks	Gregg Daniels	Dale Hellestrae
2014	Compass Media Networks	Gregg Daniels	Dale Hellestrae
2015	Compass Media Networks	Gregg Daniels	Dale Hellestrae
2016	Compass Media Networks	Gregg Daniels	Dale Hellestrae
2017	Compass Media Networks	Gregg Daniels	Dale Hellestrae
2018	Compass Media Networks	Gregg Daniels	Dale Hellestrae
2019	Compass Media Networks	Gregg Daniels	Dale Hellestrae
2020	Compass Media Networks	Gregg Daniels	Dale Hellestrae
2021	Compass Media Networks	Gregg Daniels	Dale Hellestrae
2022	Compass Media Networks	Gregg Daniels	Dale Hellestrae
2023	Compass Media Networks	Gregg Daniels	Dale Hellestrae
2024	Compass Media Networks	Gregg Daniels	Chad Brown
2025	Compass Media Networks	Gregg Daniels	Chad Brown

== Game records ==
Team	Record, Team vs. Opponent	Year
Most points scored (one team)	70, Wisconsin vs. Nebraska	2012
Most points scored (losing team)	39, Michigan State vs. Wisconsin	2011
Fewest points scored (winning team)	13, Indiana vs. Ohio State	2025
Fewest points scored (losing team)	0, Wisconsin vs. Ohio State; Iowa vs. Michigan	2014; 2023
Most points scored (both teams)	101, Wisconsin (70) vs. Nebraska (31)	2012
Fewest points scored (both teams)	23, Indiana (13) vs. Ohio State (10)	2025
Most points scored in a half	42, Wisconsin (1st half) vs. Nebraska	2012
Most points scored in a half (both teams)	55, Oregon vs. Penn State (1st half)	2024
Largest margin of victory	59, Ohio State (59) vs. Wisconsin (0)	2014
Smallest margin of victory	3, Wisconsin (42) vs. Michigan State (39); Michigan State (16) vs. Iowa (13); Indiana (13) vs. Ohio State (10)	2011; 2015; 2025
Total yards	640, Wisconsin (101 passing, 539 rushing) vs. Nebraska	2012
Rushing yards	539, Wisconsin vs. Nebraska	2012
Passing yards	499, Ohio State vs. Northwestern	2018
First downs	31, Ohio State vs. Northwestern	2018
Fewest yards allowed	155, Iowa vs. Michigan (120 passing, 35 rushing)	2023
Fewest rushing yards allowed	35, Iowa vs. Michigan	2023
Fewest passing yards allowed	101, Nebraska vs. Wisconsin; Michigan State vs. Ohio State	2012; 2013
Individual	Record, Player, Team vs. Opponent	Year
All-purpose yards	494, Dwayne Haskins, Ohio State vs. Northwestern	2018
Touchdowns (all-purpose)	5, shared by: James White, Wisconsin vs. Nebraska; Dwayne Haskins, Ohio State vs. Northwestern	2012; 2018
Rushing yards	331, Trey Sermon, Ohio State vs. Northwestern	2020
Rushing touchdowns	4, James White, Wisconsin vs. Nebraska	2012
Passing yards	499, Dwayne Haskins, Ohio State vs. Northwestern	2018
Passing touchdowns	5, Dwayne Haskins, Ohio State vs. Northwestern	2018
Receiving yards	181, Tez Johnson, Oregon vs. Penn State	2024
Receiving touchdowns	3, shared by: B. J. Cunningham, Michigan State vs. Wisconsin; Devin Smith, Ohio State vs. Wisconsin	2011; 2014
Tackles	16, Jerome Baker, Ohio State vs. Wisconsin	2017
Sacks	3, shared by: Denicos Allen, Michigan State vs. Wisconsin; Chase Young, Ohio State vs. Northwestern	2011; 2018
Interceptions	2, shared by: Doran Grant, Ohio State vs. Wisconsin; Will Johnson, Michigan vs. Purdue	2014; 2022
Field Goals Made	5, (5 att.) Mitchell Fineran, Purdue vs. Michigan	2022
Long Plays	Record, Player, Team vs. Opponent	Year
Touchdown run	81, Ezekiel Elliott, Ohio State vs. Wisconsin	2014
Touchdown pass	85, Tevaun Smith from C. J. Beathard, Iowa vs. Michigan State	2015
Kickoff return	44, Jared Abbrederis, Wisconsin vs. Michigan State	2011
Punt return	87, Semaj Morgan, Michigan vs. Iowa	2023
Interception return	37, Doran Grant, Ohio State vs. Wisconsin	2014
Fumble return	17, Travis Willock, Northwestern vs. Ohio State	2018
Punt	73, Cameron Johnston, Ohio State vs. Wisconsin	2014
Field goal	50, James Turner, Michigan vs. Iowa	2023
Miscellaneous	Record, Team vs. Team	Year
Game attendance	68,214, Ohio State vs. Indiana	2025

== Selection criteria ==
On September 1, 2011, the Big Ten Conference announced the divisional tiebreaker procedures that will be used to determine the representatives in the championship game. Division standings are based on each team's overall conference record, excluding teams ineligible for postseason because of sanctions. In the event that two teams are tied, the head-to-head results between those two teams determines the tiebreaker. Unlike the Southeastern Conference, whose rules were established before NCAA overtime and has provisions in case the two tied teams' game is either canceled or tied because of inclement weather (NCAA rules permit drawn games if, after three periods have been played, a game is tied when the game is called off because of inclement weather, including reaching curfew), the Big Ten does not have a policy in case the head-to-head result is a tie because of inclement weather.

=== Three or more-team tiebreaker procedure ===
If only two teams remain after any of the following steps, the tiebreaker will revert to the two-team tiebreaker above.

1. The records of the three or more tied teams will be compared against each other.
2. The records of the three or more tied teams will be compared against the next highest placed teams in their division in order of finish (4, 5, 6, and 7).
3. The records of the three or more tied teams will be compared against all common conference opponents.
4. The team with the best overall winning percentage (excluding exempted games) will be the representative.
5. The representative will be chosen by random draw.

== See also ==
- List of NCAA Division I FBS conference championship games
