= Donovan Edwards =

American football player (born 2003)

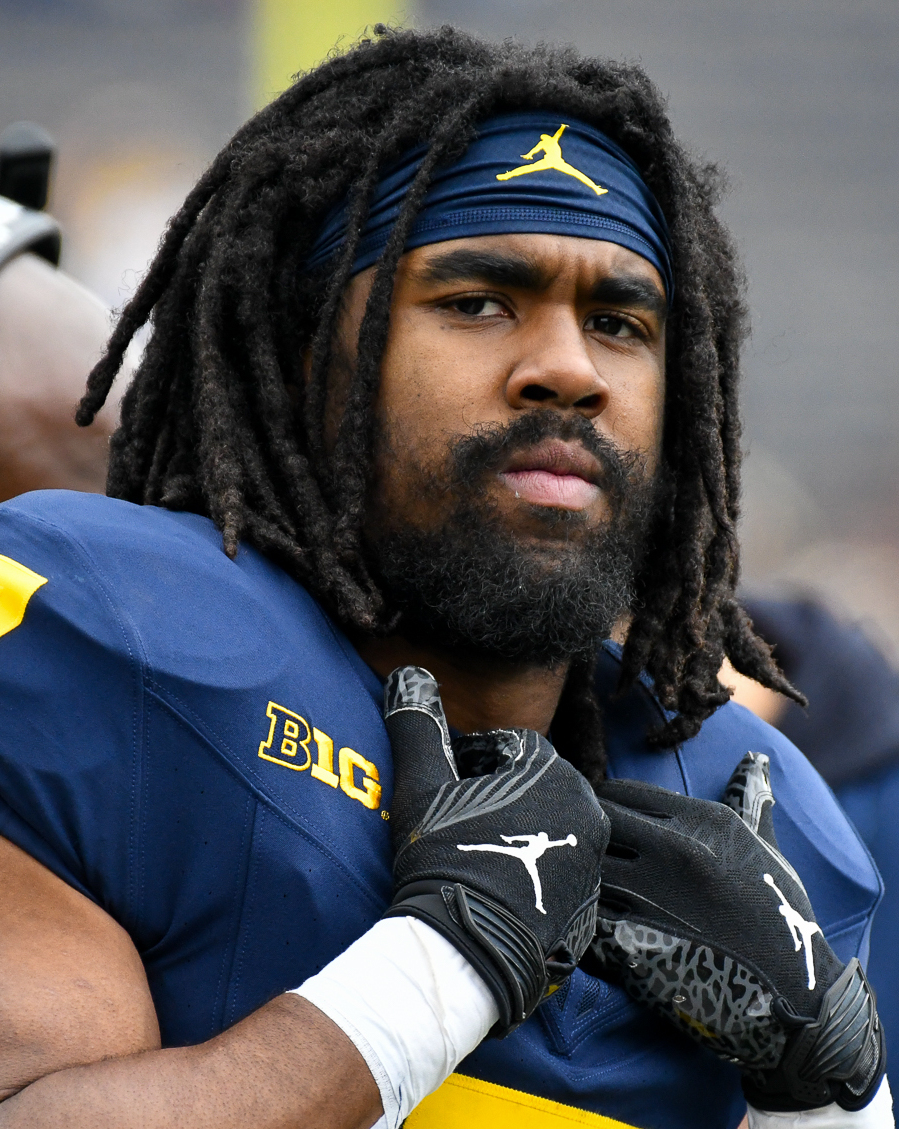
- Edwards with the Michigan Wolverines in 2024

Profile
- Position: Running back

Personal information
- Born: February 25, 2003 (age 23); West Bloomfield, Michigan, U.S.
- Listed height: 5 ft 11 in (1.80 m)
- Listed weight: 205 lb (93 kg)

Career information
- High school: West Bloomfield
- College: Michigan (2021–2024)
- NFL draft: 2025: undrafted

Career history
- New York Jets (2025)*; Washington Commanders (2025)*; Miami Dolphins (2025)
- * Offseason or practice squad member only

Awards and highlights
- CFP national champion (2023); Big Ten Championship Game MVP (2022)
- Stats at Pro Football Reference

Donovan Elin Edwards (born February 25, 2003) is a former American professional football running back. He played college football for the Michigan Wolverines, winning three consecutive Big Ten Conference titles and a national championship in 2023. Edwards is the only player in college football history to have multiple 40-yard touchdown runs in a national championship game. He signed as an undrafted free agent with the New York Jets in 2025.

== Early life ==
Edwards was born on February 25, 2003, in West Bloomfield, Michigan, the son of Kevin and Donna Edwards. His mother died from cancer in 2005 when he was two years old. He was raised by his father and older brother Kevin Jr. Edwards' grandfather Charlie Primas Jr. won Mr. Basketball of Michigan in 1950.

Edwards played high school football at West Bloomfield High School, under head coach Ronald Bellamy, who would later join Edwards at the University of Michigan as an assistant coach. He was high school teammates with Makari Paige and Semaj Morgan. As a senior, he rushed for 1,502 yards and 30 touchdowns, leading West Bloomfield to an MHSAA division 1 state championship.

In 2020, Edwards was also honored as the Michigan Gatorade Player of the Year, selected as the captain of the Detroit Free Press Dream Team, and won the Michigan Mr. Football Award. He was rated as a five-star recruit by 247Sports.

== College career ==
=== Freshman season (2021) ===
In December 2020, Edwards committed to the University of Michigan. He announced the decision on ESPN, choosing Michigan over the University of Georgia, University of Notre Dame and the University of Oklahoma. He enrolled early at Michigan in January 2021.

In the 2021 season, Edwards rushed for 174 yards on eight carries and caught 20 passes for 265 yards. He scored his first two touchdowns against Northern Illinois on September 18, 2021, a 4-yard and 58-yard touchdown. In the first half of the Big Ten Championship Game against Iowa, Edwards threw a 75-yard touchdown pass to Roman Wilson, after receiving a backwards pass from quarterback Cade McNamara.

=== Sophomore season (2022) ===
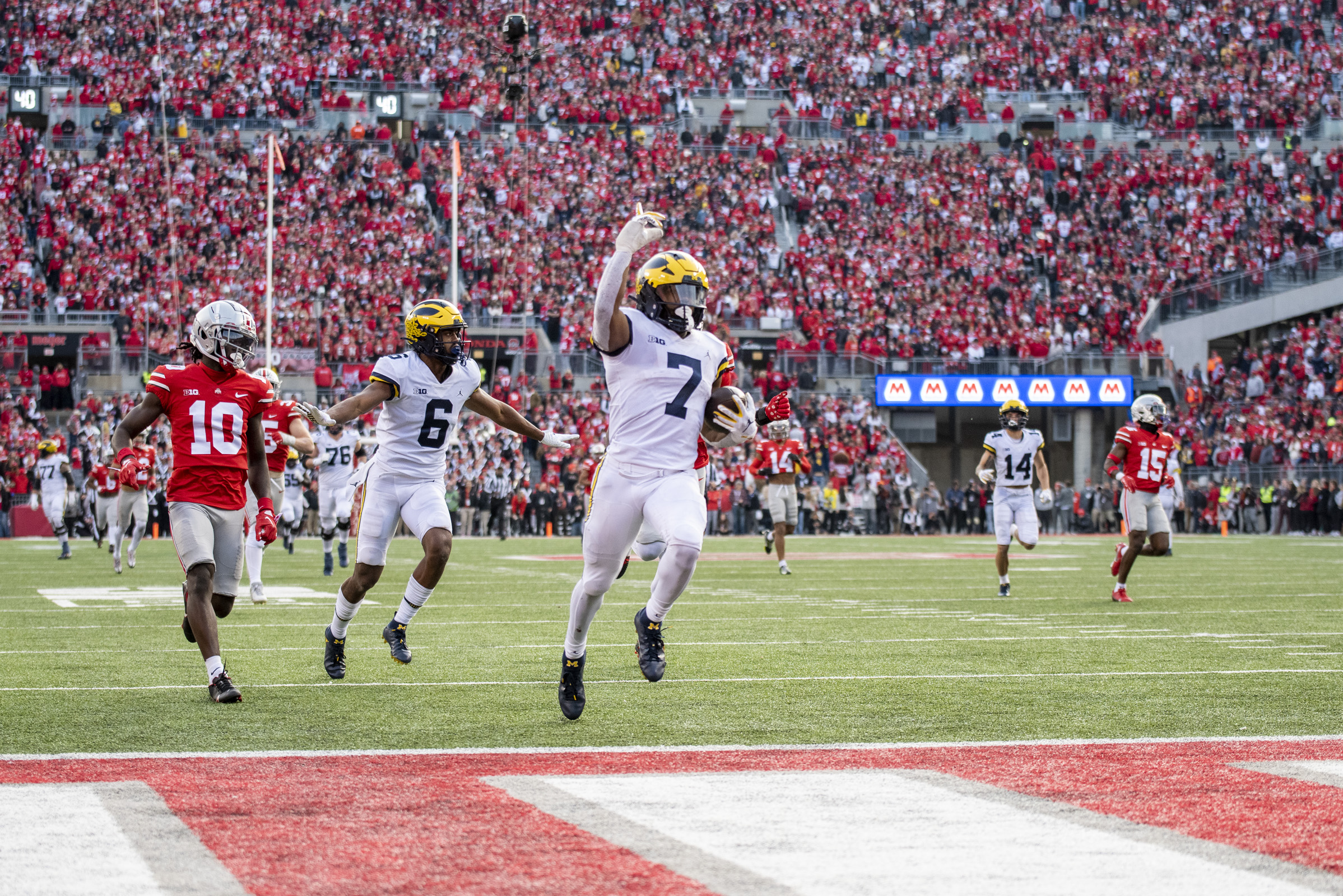
Edwards rushing for his second touchdown against Ohio State in 2022

In 2022, Edwards played in 11 games, with three starts. Edwards rushed for 991 yards, had 200 yards receiving, and scored nine touchdowns. He earned his first career start against Michigan State on October 29, and totaled 80 yards in the win. On November 26, Edwards led Michigan to a 45-23 victory against rival Ohio State in Columbus, rushing for 216 yards with touchdown runs of 75 and 85 yards in the fourth quarter.

The following week, in the Big Ten Championship Game, Edwards rushed for 185 yards and one touchdown against Purdue to win the conference championship, and earn the Big Ten Championship MVP award. On December 31, in the Fiesta Bowl (CFP semifinal), Edwards rushed for his third straight 100-yard game with 119 yards on 23 carries in the loss to TCU.

=== Junior season (2023) ===
In 2023, Edwards played in all 15 games on Michigan's national championship team, finishing with 746 rushing and receiving yards, five touchdowns and a career-high 30 receptions.

In the 2024 College Football Playoff National Championship, Edwards rushed for 104 yards, including touchdown runs of 41 and 46 yards. He became the first player in college football history, since the BCS launched in 1998, to have two rushing touchdowns of over 40 yards in a national championship game, and led Michigan to victory versus the Washington Huskies.

Donovan Edwards (104 yards) and Blake Corum (134 yards) also became the first pair of teammates in college football playoff history to each rush for over 100 yards in the national championship game.

=== Senior season (2024) ===
Entering his senior season, Edwards was ranked as one of the top running backs in college football by members of the media. He was also named one of the three cover athletes for EA Sports College Football 25, joining Quinn Ewers and Travis Hunter.

Edwards assumed the role as the leader for the Wolverines in 2024 and was voted as team captain, filling both the starting running back and leadership position held by his predecessor Blake Corum. After a slow start to the season, in week three versus Arkansas State, Edwards rushed for 82 yards and scored his first rushing touchdown of the season; second total touchdown. In week four against the USC Trojans, Edwards rushed for 74 yards and a touchdown. In week six versus Washington, Edwards carried the ball 14 times for 95 yards and a touchdown. In week nine versus Michigan State, Edwards accounted for 64 total yards, including the game deciding 23-yard touchdown pass to Colston Loveland in the fourth quarter, as Michigan defeated the Spartans 24-17.

Edwards was injured in the final regular season game versus Ohio State, and opted out of the ReliaQuest Bowl. He concluded his career at the University of Michigan with a 47–8 team record, three Big Ten championships, the 2022 Big Ten Championship MVP, as a national champion, and was 4–0 against rival Ohio State. In his four years, he finished second all-time in receiving yards among Michigan running backs, and had more than 3,000 all-purpose yards with 25 total touchdowns.

=== Statistics ===
College statistics
Season	Games		Rushing				Receiving			
Season	GP	GS	Att	Yards	Avg	TD	Rec	Yards	Avg	TD
2021	12	0	35	174	5.0	3	20	265	13.3	1
2022	11	3	140	991	7.1	7	18	200	11.1	2
2023	15	1	119	497	4.2	5	30	249	8.3	0
2024	12	4	128	589	4.6	4	18	83	4.6	1
Career	50	8	422	2,251	5.3	19	86	797	9.3	4

== Professional career ==
Pre-draft measurables
Height	Weight	Arm length	Hand span	Wingspan	40-yard dash	10-yard split	20-yard split	Vertical jump	Bench press
5 ft 11 3/8 in (1.81 m)	205 lb (93 kg)	30 in (0.76 m)	10 in (0.25 m)	6 ft 2 5/8 in (1.90 m)	4.44 s	1.51 s	2.58 s	38.5 in (0.98 m)	23 reps
All values from NFL Combine

=== New York Jets ===
On April 26, 2025, Edwards signed with the New York Jets as an undrafted free agent. He was waived on August 26 as part of final roster cuts.

=== Washington Commanders ===
On August 28, 2025, Edwards signed with the Washington Commanders' practice squad.

=== Miami Dolphins ===
On January 2, 2026, Edwards was signed by the Miami Dolphins off of the Commanders' practice squad. On August 29, Edwards was waived by the Dolphins as a part of preliminary roster cuts.

== Personal life ==
Edwards is Christian.
