= Payne Durham =

American football player (born 2000)

- Durham with the Tampa Bay Buccaneers in 2026

No. 87 – Tampa Bay Buccaneers
- Position: Tight end
- Roster status: Active

Personal information
- Born: June 15, 2000 (age 26); Suwanee, Georgia, U.S.
- Listed height: 6 ft 5 in (1.96 m)
- Listed weight: 255 lb (116 kg)

Career information
- High school: Peachtree Ridge (Suwanee)
- College: Purdue (2018–2022)
- NFL draft: 2023: 5th round, 171st overall pick

Career history
- Tampa Bay Buccaneers (2023–present)

Awards and highlights
- Second-team All-Big Ten (2022)

Career NFL statistics as of Week 7, 2026
- Receptions: 18
- Receiving yards: 189
- Receiving touchdowns: 2
- Stats at Pro Football Reference

William Payne Durham (born June 15, 2000) is an American professional football tight end for the Tampa Bay Buccaneers of the National Football League (NFL). He played college football for the Purdue Boilermakers.

== Early life ==
Durham attended Peachtree Ridge High School in Suwanee, Georgia. He played lacrosse in high school and did not start playing football until his senior year. In his lone season, he had 22 receptions for 330 yards and five touchdowns. He committed to Purdue University to play college football.

== College career ==
Durham played in two games his first year at Purdue in 2018. In 2019, he started four of 12 games and had nine receptions for 82 yards and four touchdowns. He started all six games in 2020, recording 16 receptions for 166 yards and three touchdowns. Durham started 10 of 12 games in 2021, finishing with 467 yards on 45 receptions and six touchdowns. He returned to Purdue as the starter in 2022.

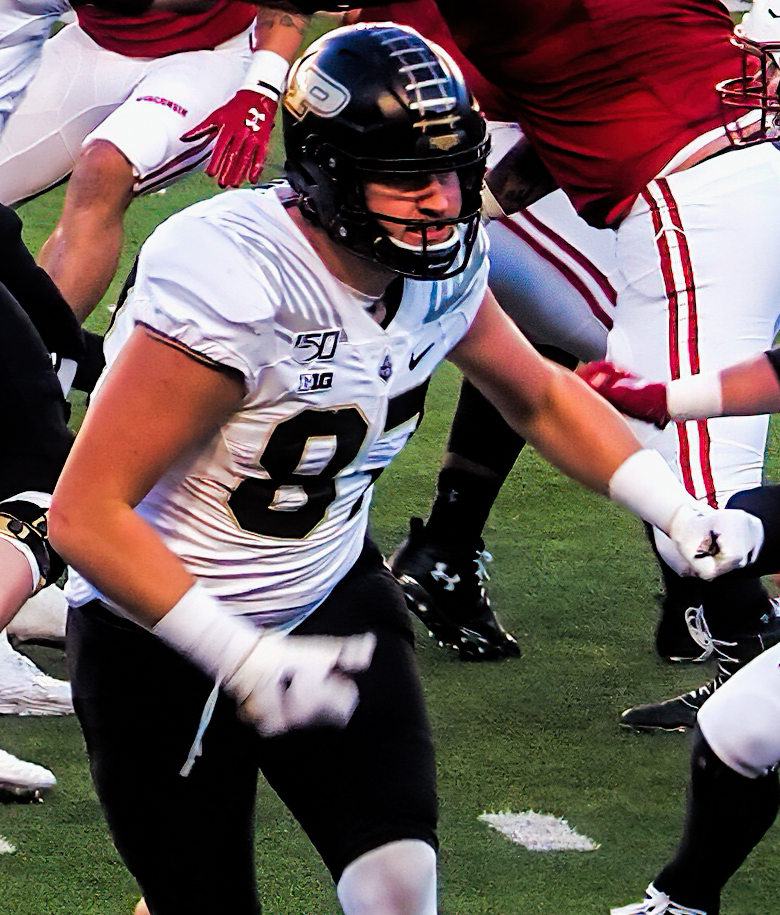
Durham with Purdue in 2019

Durham played in the 2022 Senior Bowl.

== Professional career ==
Pre-draft measurables
Height	Weight	Arm length	Hand span	Wingspan	40-yard dash	10-yard split	20-yard split	20-yard shuttle	Three-cone drill	Vertical jump	Broad jump	Bench press
6 ft 5 5/8 in (1.97 m)	253 lb (115 kg)	33 3/8 in (0.85 m)	9 3/4 in (0.25 m)	6 ft 8 3/8 in (2.04 m)	4.87 s	1.61 s	2.79 s	4.51 s	7.15 s	34.5 in (0.88 m)	9 ft 9 in (2.97 m)	14 reps
All values from NFL Combine/Pro Day

Durham was selected by the Tampa Bay Buccaneers in the fifth round, 171st overall, of the 2023 NFL draft. He appeared in 13 games and started two as a rookie in the 2023 season. He finished with five receptions for 58 yards. He scored his first receiving NFL touchdown against the Carolina Panthers in the 3rd quarter of a 2024 week 16 home match up.

== NFL career statistics ==
Legend
**Bold**	Career high

=== Regular season ===
Year	Team	Games		Receiving					Tackles			Fumbles	
Year	Team	GP	GS	Rec	Yds	Avg	Lng	TD	Cmb	Solo	Ast	Fum	Lost
2023	TB	13	2	5	58	**11.6**	25	0	0	0	0	0	0
2024	TB	16	6	**11**	**115**	10.5	**31**	**2**	**2**	0	**2**	**1**	0
2025	TB	17	10	1	11	11.0	11	0	**2**	**1**	1	0	0
Career		46	18	17	184	10.8	31	2	4	1	3	1	0

=== Postseason ===
Year	Team	Games		Receiving					Tackles			Fumbles	
Year	Team	GP	GS	Rec	Yds	Avg	Lng	TD	Cmb	Solo	Ast	Fum	Lost
2023	TB	2	1	**1**	**18**	**18.0**	**18**	0	**1**	**1**	0	0	0
2024	TB	1	1	0	0	0.0	0	0	0	0	0	0	0
Career		3	2	1	18	18.0	18	0	1	1	0	0	0
