= Mitchell Fineran =

American football player

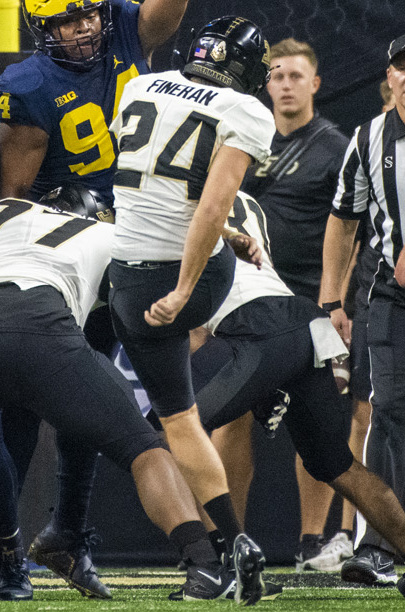
- Fineran (#24) with Purdue

No. 24 – Purdue Boilermakers
- Position: Placekicker

Personal information
- Born: Fort Valley, Georgia, U.S.
- Listed height: 5 ft 11 in (1.80 m)
- Listed weight: 185 lb (84 kg)

Career information
- High school: Peach County (Fort Valley, Georgia)
- College: Samford (2018–2021); Purdue (2021–2022)

Awards and highlights
- SoCon All-Freshman Team (2018); All-SoCon Second Team (2019); All-SoCon First Team (2020-2021); FCS All-America Second Team (2020-2021)
- Stats at ESPN

Mitchell Fineran is a former American college football placekicker for the Purdue Boilermakers of the Big Ten Conference (Big Ten). Prior to enrolling at Purdue as a graduate transfer in 2021, he attended and played football at Samford University in the Southern Conference (SoCon) of the NCAA Division I Football Championship Subdivision (FCS).

At Samford, Fineran earned 2018 SoCon All-Freshman Team, 2019 All-SoCon Second Team, and 2020-2021 FCS All-America Second Team honors. At Purdue, he was selected as a 2021 All-Big Ten Honorable Mention and Pre Season All-Big Ten, All-Big Ten Academic Team, All-Big Ten District Academic Team in 2022.

== Early life ==
Fineran attended Peach County High School in Fort Valley, Georgia, where he served as the placekicker on the Trojans' football team from 2014 to 2017. As a junior, he helped the Trojans reach the 2016 Class state playoff semifinals. He finished the season with 10 made field goals, including a long of 52 yards, and 57-of-58 PATs. His junior placekicking performance earned him Georgia Class AAA All-State honors.

Entering his senior season, Fineran was named to the Preseason Georgia Class AAA All-State Team. As a senior, he was the highest scorer with 119 points (13-of-19 on field goals and 80-of-81 on PATs) on Peach County's 2017 team that scored 646 points, which ranks as the 26th highest scoring team in the history of Georgia high school football. As Peach County's kickoff specialist, he had the second-most touchbacks on kickoffs in the nation as a senior. In the 2017 Class AAA state championship game, Fineran was Peach County's lone scoring, converting 50-yard and 37-yard field goals, in a 10-6 loss to Calhoun High School. His senior performance earned him Class AAA All-State honors.

His 32 career field goals are tied for eighth-most all-time in Georgia state high school football history. He successfully converted five field goals of 50 yards or more in his high school career. He is one of only 14 kickers in Georgia high school football history to make multiple field goals of 52 yards or more. He finished his high school career having made 32-of-51 field goal attempts and 193-of-205 PATs.

In 2016 and 2017, he attended the Southern Showcase Camp. In 2017, he attended the National Scholarship Camp. Kohl's Kicking rated Fineran as a five-star placekicker and ranked him No. 37 placekicker nationally and No. 4 in the state of Georgia among placekickers in the Class of 2018. He was invited to and played in the Rising Seniors All-Star Game, which was broadcast on ESPN. As a college recruit prospect, Fineran committed to attend and play football for the Samford Bulldogs over an offer from Army.

== College career ==
=== 2018 (Samford) ===
As a freshman, Fineran served as the Samford Bulldogs primary placekicker and appeared in all 11 games. He recorded his first and only career fumble recovery in Samford's Week 5 game against Kennesaw State. He converted his then-career-long field goal of 46 yards against Furman. He finished his freshman campaign making 13-of-17 field goals and all 50 PATs. His 89 points scored led the Southern Conference. He was named to the 2018 SoCon All-Freshman Team.

=== 2019 (Samford) ===
Entering his sophomore season, Fineran was named to the Preseason All-SoCon First Team and the watch list for the Fred Mitchell Award, which recognizes the top placekicker in FCS, Division II, Division III, National Association of Intercollegiate Athletics (NAIA), and National Junior College Athletic Association (NJCAA) who exemplifies continued community service.

Continuing to serve as the Bulldogs primary placekicker, he started the 2019 season by making his first seven field goal attempts. He recorded his first and only career reception (seven yards) on a fake field goal play against Furman. He earned SoCon Player of the Week honors for his kicking performance against The Citadel.

His streak of 91 consecutive PATs made over the 2018 and 2019 seasons is the seventh-longest PAT streak in SoCon history. His 91 points scored led the Southern Conference for the second consecutive season. He also led the Conference in field goals made (15) and field goals made per game (1.5). His 2019 performance earned him All-SoCon Second Team honors as well as selection to the 2019 Fred Mitchell Award Top 10 List. His sophomore efforts earned him 2019 All-SoCon Second Team honors. He was also named to the 2019 Southern Conference Academic Honors List.

=== 2020-2021 (Samford) ===
Entering his junior season, Fineran was named to the Preseason All-SoCon First Team. After Samford's season was postponed, along with the rest of the SoCon, to the spring of 2021 due to the COVID-19 pandemic, Fineran continued in his role as the Bulldogs' primary placekicker in their abbreviated seven-game season, appearing in every game. In the first quarter of the Bulldogs' game against Furman, he made a career-long 50-yard field goal en route to a 3-for-3 field goal and 4-for-4 PAT effort. He finished the season making 15-of-18 field goals, with a long of 50 yards, and 32-of-33 PATs. His 2.14 field goals per game ranked third among all kickers in the FCS. His 15 made field goals tied for the most in the FCS. His was the third-highest scoring FCS player with 77 points.

After his junior season performance, he was selected to the FCS All-America Second Team and All-SoCon First Team.

=== 2021 (Purdue) ===
After graduating from Samford, Fineran enrolled at Purdue as a graduate transfer, joined the football team, and served as the Boilermakers primary placekicker for the 2021 season. On November 11, he tied a career-high for single-game points scored with 16, successfully converting all four field goal attempts and all four PATs, in Purdue's 40-29 upset win over No. 3-ranked Michigan State. He again tied this 16-point mark in Purdue's 48-45 bowl game victory over Tennessee in the 2021 Music City Bowl, including the game-winning field goal in overtime.

In 2021, Fineran's 24 field goals made tied for the most in the Big Ten, third-most in the nation, and second-most in a single season in Purdue program history. His field goal percentage of 82.8% ranks as the best all-time Purdue career percentage (minimum 15 attempts) and second-best all-time in a single season (one field goal attempt per game minimum) in Purdue football history, as well as 25th-best in the nation in 2021. His 29 field goals attempted were the most in the Big Ten, tied for the fourth-most in the nation, and third-most in a single season in Purdue program history. His 1.85 field goals per game ranked third-most in the nation. His 11 field goals made of 20-29 yards were the most in the Big Ten and tied for the third-most in the nation. His 12 field goals made of 30-39 yards were the second-most in the Big Ten and the nation. His four field goals made against Michigan State and Tennessee are tied for third-most in a single game in Purdue history. Fineran is 2nd all-time for a single season in field goals, with 24 accomplished this season. His kicking average of 82.8 this season makes him 2nd all-time at Purdue.

His 2021 kicking performance earned him All-Big Ten Honorable Mention honors from both the Big Ten Coaches and the Big Ten Media.

=== 2022 (Purdue) ===
Fineran held a 4.0 grade point average as he pursued a Master's degree in technology leadership and innovation, representing the Highest GPA on the Purdue Football Team (2022). As a Purdue Boilermaker, Fineran made 18-for-24 field goal attempts this season with a long of 46 yards and 42 kicks in both seasons to rank fourth in the program history. His 79.3 field goal percentage sits atop Purdue's career leaderboard by kickers with 15 or more attempts, making him the Purdue all-time career kicking leader.

Fineran became very familiar to Purdue fans over his final two seasons as he closed out his collegiate career with legendary runs in Purdue kicker history with a 79.3% career field goal percentage. He also finishes his career 4th all-time in field goals, with 42 field goals made across his final two seasons with Purdue.

Purdue had an overall successful season, going 8-6 on its way to the Big Ten Championship game. Although the Boilermakers lost that game to Michigan, Fineran kicked five field goals setting a Big Ten Championship Record and tied the Purdue all-time record for field goals in a single game.

Fineran was named to the 2022 Lou Groza Award Preseason Watch List in his second season with the Purdue football program, as announced by the Palm Beach County Sports Commission. The honor is presented annually to the nation's top placekicker in college football.

Fineran and three other Boilermakers, Ben Furtney, Gus Hartwig, and Khordae Sydnor, earned Academic All-District Recognition and were advanced to the CSC Academic All-America ballot. He was also included in the 2022 Fall Academic All-Big Ten Honorees.

== College statistics ==
			Field Goals				PATs			Points	Kickoffs		
Season	School	G	FGM	FGA	FG%	Long	XPM	XPA	XP%	Total	Att	TB	Avg
2018	SAM	11	13	17	76.5	46	50	50	100.0	89	70	13	57.1
2019	SAM	12	15	21	71.4	45	46	47	97.9	91	66	23	58.7
2020*	SAM	7	15	18	83.3	50	32	33	97.0	77	54	31	60.0
2021	PUR	13	24	29	82.8	48	40	42	95.2	112	5	0	59.6
2022	PUR	14	18	24	75.0	40	41	44	93.2	95			
Totals		57	85	109	77.8	50	209	216	96.7	464	195	67	58.0

*The 2020 Southern Conference football season was postponed to and played from February to April 2021 due to the COVID-19 pandemic.

== Personal life ==
Fineran's brother, McClain, is a college football place kicker committed to the Washburn Ichabods. McClain formerly played for the Shorter Hawks

In college, Fineran has been involved in community volunteer work, including the Exceptional Foundation, Volunteer Magic City Woodworks, as a Samford Student Athlete Mentor at Goodyear Elementary School, and Habitat for Humanity Volunteer Summers.

He graduated from Samford with a bachelor's degree in Sports Administration and pursued a master's degree in Technology, Leadership, and Innovation at Purdue.

In January 2025, Fineran's Twitter profile described him as working as a kicking coach based out of Savannah, Georgia.

As of February 2026, Fineran is working as an electrical project manager at a construction company in Savannah.
