= 2022 Northwestern Wildcats football team =

American college football season

2022 Northwestern Wildcats football
- Conference: Big Ten Conference
- Record: 1–11 (1–8 Big Ten)
- Head coach: Pat Fitzgerald (17th season)
- Offensive coordinator: Mike Bajakian (3rd season)
- Offensive scheme: Spread
- Defensive coordinator: Jim O'Neil (2nd season)
- Base defense: 4–3/3–4 hybrid
- Home stadium: Ryan Field

Uniform

2022 Big Ten Conference football standings
	Conf.			Overall
Team	W		L	W		L
East Division
No. 3 Michigan xy$^	9	–	0	13	–	1
No. 4 Ohio State ^	8	–	1	11	–	2
No. 7 Penn State	7	–	2	11	–	2
Maryland	4	–	5	8	–	5
Indiana	2	–	7	4	–	8
Rutgers	1	–	8	4	–	8
Michigan State†	0	–	6	0	–	7
West Division
Purdue xy	6	–	3	8	–	6
Illinois	5	–	4	8	–	5
Iowa	5	–	4	8	–	5
Minnesota	5	–	4	9	–	4
Wisconsin	4	–	5	7	–	6
Nebraska	3	–	6	4	–	8
Northwestern	1	–	8	1	–	11
Championship: Michigan 43, Purdue 22
^ – College Football Playoff participant; $ – Conference champion; x – Division champion/co-champions; y – Championship game participant; † — NCAA vacated all wins for Michigan State (5–7, 3–6); Rankings from AP Poll

The 2022 Northwestern Wildcats football team represented Northwestern University during the 2022 NCAA Division I FBS football season. The Wildcats played their home games at Ryan Field in Evanston, Illinois, and competed as members of the Big Ten Conference. They were led by 17th-year head coach Pat Fitzgerald.

== Schedule ==
Northwestern announced its 2022 football schedule on January 12, 2022. The 2022 schedule consisted of six home games and five away games, as well as a neutral-site game in the regular season. The Wildcats hosted Big Ten foes Wisconsin, Ohio State, and Illinois and traveled to Penn State, Maryland, Iowa, Minnesota, and Purdue. They played Nebraska at Aviva Stadium in Dublin, Ireland, which was their only win of the entire season. The Wildcats hosted all three non-conference opponents, Duke from the ACC, Southern Illinois from Division I FCS, and Miami (OH) from the MAC.

Date	Time	Opponent	Site	TV	Result	Attendance
August 27	11:30 a.m.	vs. Nebraska	Aviva Stadium; Dublin Ireland (Aer Lingus College Football Classic)	FOX	W 31–28	42,699
September 10	11:00 a.m.	Duke*	Ryan Field; Evanston, IL	FS1	L 23–31	24,622
September 17	11:00 a.m.	Southern Illinois*	Ryan Field; Evanston, IL	BTN	L 24–31	23,146
September 24	6:30 p.m.	Miami (OH)*	Ryan Field; Evanston, IL	BTN	L 14–17	23,773
October 1	2:30 p.m.	at No. 11 Penn State	Beaver Stadium; University Park, PA	ESPN	L 7–17	105,524
October 8	2:30 p.m.	Wisconsin^{†}	Ryan Field; Evanston, IL	BTN	L 7–42	32,121
October 22	2:30 p.m.	at Maryland	Maryland Stadium; College Park, MD	BTN	L 24–31	31,418
October 29	2:30 p.m.	at Iowa	Kinnick Stadium; Iowa City, IA	ESPN2	L 13–33	69,250
November 5	11:00 a.m.	No. 2 Ohio State	Ryan Field; Evanston, IL	ABC	L 7–21	42,774
November 12	2:30 p.m.	at Minnesota	Huntington Bank Stadium; Minneapolis, MN	BTN	L 3–31	41,686
November 19	11:00 a.m.	at Purdue	Ross-Ade Stadium; West Lafayette, IN	FS1	L 9–17	54,016
November 26	2:30 p.m.	Illinois	Ryan Field; Evanston, IL (rivalry)	BTN	L 3–41	25,744
*Non-conference game; ^{†}Homecoming; Rankings from AP Poll released prior to the game; All times are in Central time

== Game summaries ==
=== Nebraska ===
Northwestern Wildcats (0–0) vs Nebraska Cornhuskers (0–0) – Game summary

Quarter	1	2	3	4	Total
Wildcats	3	14	7	7	31
Cornhuskers	7	7	14	0	28

at Aviva Stadium • Dublin, Ireland

- Date: August 27, 2022
- Game time: 4:30 p.m. GMT
- Game weather: Sunny, 65 °F (18 °C)
- Game attendance: 42,699
- Referee: Mark Cannon
- TV announcers (FOX): Jason Benetti (play-by-play) and Brock Huard (analyst)

Game information

First quarter

- (12:41) NEB – Isaiah Garcia-Castaneda 32-yard pass from Casey Thompson, Timmy Bleekrode kick (Drive: 8 plays, 75 yards, 2:19; Nebraska 7–0)
- (2:13) NW – Adam Stage 35-yard field goal (Drive: 9 plays, 35 yards, 4:28; Nebraska 7–3)

Second quarter

- (11:59) NEB – Casey Thompson 1-yard run, Timmy Bleekrode kick (Drive: 14 plays, 80 yards, 5:14; Nebraska 14–3)
- (10:58) NW – Raymond Niro III 41-yard pass from Ryan Hilinski, Adam Stage kick (Drive: 4 plays, 75 yards, 1:01; Nebraska 14–10)
- (0:25) NW – Donny Navarro III 6-yard pass from Ryan Hilinski, Adam Stage kick (Drive: 13 plays, 82 yards, 3:15; Northwestern 17–14)

Third quarter

- (9:37) NEB – Anthony Grant 3-yard run, Timmy Bleekrode kick (Drive: 8 plays, 88 yards, 3:24; Nebraska 21–17)
- (9:09) NEB – Anthony Grant 46-yard run, Timmy Bleekrode kick (Drive: 2 plays, 46 yards, 0:17; Nebraska 28–17)
- (7:53) NW – Cam Porter 3-yard run, Adam Stage kick (Drive: 5 plays, 44 yards, 1:16; Nebraska 28–24)

Fourth quarter

- (11:34) NW – Evan Hull 4-yard run, Adam Stage kick (Drive: 6 plays, 42 yards, 0:50; Northwestern 31–28)

Statistics	NW	NEB
First downs	25	23
Total yards	528	465
Rushes/yards	47–214	31–110
Passing yards	314	355
Passing: Comp–Att–Int	27–38–0	25–42–2
Time of possession	34:14	25:46

Team	Category	Player	Statistics
Northwestern	Passing	Ryan Hilinski	27/38, 314 yards, 2 TD
Northwestern	Rushing	Evan Hull	22 carries, 119 yards, TD
Northwestern	Receiving	Malik Washington	8 receptions, 97 yards
Nebraska	Passing	Casey Thompson	25/42, 355 yards, TD, INT
Nebraska	Rushing	Anthony Grant	19 carries, 101 yards, 2 TD
Nebraska	Receiving	Isaiah Garcia-Castaneda	4 receptions, 120 yards, TD

=== Duke ===
	1	2	3	4	Total
Blue Devils	14	7	0	10	31
Wildcats	0	10	6	7	23

=== Southern Illinois ===
	1	2	3	4	Total
Salukis	0	14	3	14	31
Wildcats	7	7	0	10	24

=== Miami (OH) ===
	1	2	3	4	Total
RedHawks	0	7	0	10	17
Wildcats	7	0	0	7	14

=== At No. 11 Penn State ===
Northwestern at No. 11 Penn State – Game summary

Quarter	1	2	3	4	Total
Wildcats	0	0	7	0	7
No. 11 Nittany Lions	7	7	0	3	17

at Beaver Stadium, University Park, Pennsylvania

- Date: October 1
- Game time: 3:30 p.m. EDT
- Game weather: 52 °F (11 °C), rain
- Game attendance: 105,524
- Referee: Greg Blum
- TV announcers (ESPN): Bob Wischusen (play-by-play), Dan Orlovsky (analyst), and Kris Budden (sideline reporter)
- ESPN box score

Game information

First quarter

- PSU – Brenton Strange, 20-yard TD pass from Sean Clifford, Jake Pinegar kick, 0:15 (7–0, PSU)

Second quarter

- PSU – Nicholas Singleton, 2-yard TD run, Pinegar kick, 5:02 (14–0, PSU)

Third quarter

- NU – Jacob Gill, 47-yard TD pass from Ryan Hilinski, Adam Stage kick, 2:10 (14–7, PSU)

Fourth quarter

- PSU – Pinegar, 38-yard field goal, 14:29 (17–7, PSU)

Statistics	NU	PSU
First downs	12	21
Plays–yards	65–241	78–360
Rushes–yards	28–31	58–220
Passing yards	210	140
Passing: comp–att–int	15–37–1	10–20–1
Turnovers		
Time of possession	22:32	37:28

Team	Category	Player	Statistics
Northwestern	Passing	Ryan Hilinski	15/37, 210 yards, TD, INT
Northwestern	Rushing	Evan Hull	11 carries, 45 yards
Northwestern	Receiving	Donny Navarro III	4 receptions, 55 yards
Penn State	Passing	Sean Clifford	10/20, 140 yards, TD, INT
Penn State	Rushing	Nicholas Singleton	21 carries, 87 yards, TD
Penn State	Receiving	Parker Washington	4 receptions, 73 yards

=== Wisconsin ===
Wisconsin vs. Northwestern – Game summary

Quarter	1	2	3	4	Total
Badgers	7	21	0	14	42
Wildcats	0	0	0	7	7

at Ryan Field, Evanston, Illinois

- Date: October 8, 2022
- Game time: 2:30 p.m.
- Game weather: 58 °F (14 °C) • Wind: W at 15 miles per hour (24 km/h) • Weather: Sunny
- Game attendance: 32,121
- Referee: Larry Smith
- TV announcers (BTN): Mark Followill (play-by-play), Brock Vereen (analyst), and Rick Pizzo (sideline reporter)

Game information

First quarter

- WIS – Skyler Bell 15-yard pass from Graham Mertz (Nate Van Zelst Kick), 2:25 Wisconsin 7–0, Drive: 9 plays, 98 yards, 5:00

Second quarter

- WIS – Chimere Dike 52-yard pass from Graham Mertz (Nate Van Zelst Kick), 14:50 Wisconsin 14–0, Drive: 3 plays, 57 yards, 0:41
- WIS – Chimere Dike 21-yard pass from Graham Mertz (Nate Van Zelst Kick), 6:58 Wisconsin 21–0, Drive: 6 plays, 66 yards, 2:45
- WIS – Chez Mellusi 23-yard pass from Braelon Allen (Nate Van Zelst Kick), 2:11 Wisconsin 28–0, Drive: 7 plays, 61 yards, 3:11

Third quarter

No scoring

Fourth quarter

- WIS – Chimere Dike 6-yard pass from Graham Mertz (Nate Van Zelst Kick), 14:53 Wisconsin 35–0, Drive: 4 plays, 37 yards, 1:51
- NU – Anthony Tyus III 1-yard pass from Brendan Sullivan (Jack Olsen Kick), 11:08 Wisconsin 35–7, Drive: 8 plays, 78 yards, 3:43
- WIS – Markus Allen 19-yard pass from Graham Mertz (Nate Van Zelst Kick), 2:28 Wisconsin 42–7, Drive: 14 plays, 84 yards, 1:51

Top passers

- NU – Brendan Sullivan – 11/17, 114 yards, TD
- WIS – Graham Mertz – 20/29, 299 yards 5 TD

Top rushers

- NU – Brendan Sullivan – 10 carries, 33 yards
- WIS – Braelon Allen – 23 carries, 135 yards

Top receivers

- NU – Bryce Kirtz – 2 receptions, 66 yards
- WIS – Chimere Dike – 10 receptions, 185 yards, 3 TD

Top defenders

- NU – Garnett Hollis Jr. – 9 tackles, pass breakup
- WIS – Nick Herbig – 7 tackles, TFL, sack, forced fumble

=== At Maryland ===
Northwestern Wildcats (1–5) at Maryland Terrapins (5–2) - Game summary

Quarter	1	2	3	4	Total
Northwestern	7	10	0	7	24
Maryland	0	10	14	7	31

at SECU Stadium • College Park, MD

- Date: October 22
- Game time: 3:30 p.m. EST/12:30 p.m. PST
- Game weather: Sunny • Temperature: 68 °F (20 °C) • Wind: 3 mph SW
- Game attendance: 31,418
- Referee: Michael Cannon
- TV announcers (BTN): Brandon Gaudin (play-by-play), Jake Butt (analyst), and Rick Pizzo (sideline reporter)

Game information

First quarter

- 2:54 NW - Brendan Sullivan 1-yard run (Adam Stage kick) - 7-0 Northwestern, Drive: 3 plays, 50 yards, 0:48

Second quarter

- 13:43 MD - Roman Hemby 14-yard run (Chad Ryland kick) - 7-7, Drive: 12 plays, 87 yards, 4:06
- 10:25 NW - Adam Stage 24-yard field goal - 10-7 Northwestern, Drive: 8 plays, 68 yards, 3:18
- 4:50 NW - Evan Hull 10-yard pass from Brendan Sullivan (Adam Stage kick) - 17-7 Northwestern, Drive: 12 plays, 83 yards, 4:12
- 0:08 MD - Chad Ryland 20-yard field goal - 17-10 Northwestern, Drive: 16 plays, 86 yards, 4:40

Third quarter

- 10:21 MD - Roman Hemby 18-yard run (Chad Ryland kick) - 17-17, Drive: 8 plays, 54 yards, 2:54
- 1:07 MD - Rakim Jarrett 30-yard pass from Billy Edwards Jr. (Chad Ryland kick) - 24-17 Maryland, Drive: 9 plays, 65 yards, 4:33

Fourth quarter

- 3:34 NW - Andrew Clair 9-yard run (Adam Stage kick) - 24-24, Drive: 9 plays, 72 yards, 2:50
- 3:22 MD - Roman Hemby 75-yard run (Chad Ryland kick) - 31-24 Maryland, Drive: 1 play, 75 yards, 0:12

Statistics	Northwestern	Maryland
First downs	24	25
Plays–yards	70–358	78–423
Rushes–yards	46–215	50–257
Passing yards	143	166
Passing: comp–att–int	18–24–2	18–28–0
Turnovers		
Time of possession	27:10	32:50

Team	Category	Player	Statistics
Northwestern	Passing	Brendan Sullivan	18/24, 143 yards, 1 TD, 2 INT
Northwestern	Rushing	Evan Hull	20 carries, 119 yards
Northwestern	Receiving	Malik Washington	6 receptions, 72 yards
Maryland	Passing	Billy Edwards Jr.	18/28, 166 yards, 1 TD
Maryland	Rushing	Roman Hemby	24 carries, 179 yards, 2 TD
Maryland	Receiving	Rakim Jarrett	8 receptions, 82 yards, 1 TD

=== At Iowa ===
	1	2	3	4	Total
Wildcats	0	0	7	6	13
Hawkeyes	10	10	3	10	33

Statistics	NU	IOWA
First downs	16	24
Total yards	177	393
Rushing yards	18	173
Passing yards	159	220
Turnovers	1	0
Time of possession	28:16	31:44

Team	Category	Player	Statistics
Northwestern	Passing	Brendan Sullivan	23–30, 159 yards, 2 TD, INT
Northwestern	Rushing	Evan Hull	11 carries, 32 yards
Northwestern	Receiving	Bryce Kirtz	5 receptions, 35 yards
Iowa	Passing	Spencer Petras	21–30, 220 yards, TD
Iowa	Rushing	Kaleb Johnson	13 carries, 93 yards
Iowa	Receiving	Nico Ragaini	4 receptions, 66 yards

=== No. 2 Ohio State ===
No. 2 Ohio State Buckeyes (8-0) at Northwestern Wildcats (1-7) – Game summary

Quarter	1	2	3	4	Total
No. 2 Buckeyes	0	7	7	7	21
Wildcats	7	0	0	0	7

at Ryan Field, Evanston, Illinois

- Date: November 5
- Game time: 12:00 p.m. EDT
- Game weather: Rain, windy, 62 °F (17 °C)
- Game attendance: 42,774
- Referee: Ron Snodgrass
- TV announcers (ABC): Sean McDonough (play-by-play), Todd Blackledge (analyst), and Molly McGrath (sideline reporter)
- Spread: Ohio State –38 • Odds to win: Ohio State 98.4% •

Game information

First quarter

- 6:45 NU – Evan Hull runs for 16 yards (Adam Stage kick) – Northwestern 7–0, Drive: 9 plays, 80 yards, 3:18

Second quarter

- 2:26 OSU – Emeka Egbuka runs for 15 yards (Noah Ruggles kick) – Tied 7–7, Drive: 6 plays, 46 yards, 2:29

Third quarter

- 8:44 OSU – Miyan Williams runs for 27 yards (Noah Ruggles kick) Ohio State 14–7, Drive: 6 plays, 45 yards, 2:01

Fourth quarter

- 4:21 OSU – Miyan Williams runs for 2 yards (Noah Ruggles kick) Ohio State 21–7, Drive: 5 plays, 62 yards, 2:06

Statistics	No. 2 Ohio State	Northwestern
First downs	13	17
Plays–yards	61–283	76–285
Rushes–yards	35–207	59–206
Passing yards	76	79
Passing: comp–att–int	10–26–0	10–17–0
Turnovers		
Time of possession	23:34	36:26

Team	Category	Player	Statistics
No. 2 Ohio State	Passing	C. J. Stroud	10–26, 76 yards, 0 TD
No. 2 Ohio State	Rushing	Miyan Williams	26 carries, 111 yards, 2 TD
No. 2 Ohio State	Receiving	Marvin Harrison, Jr.	5 receptions, 51 yards, 0 TD
Northwestern	Passing	Brendan Sullivan	10–17, 79 yards, 0 TD
Northwestern	Rushing	Evan Hull	30 carries, 122 yards, 1 TD
Northwestern	Receiving	Malik Washington	6 receptions, 49 yards, 0 TD

=== At Minnesota ===
	1	2	3	4	Total
Wildcats	0	3	0	0	3
Golden Gophers	7	7	3	14	31

=== At Purdue ===
	1	2	3	4	Total
Wildcats	0	3	0	6	9
Boilermakers	7	7	0	3	17

=== Illinois ===
	1	2	3	4	Total
Fighting Illini	7	10	17	7	41
Wildcats	0	0	0	3	3

== Roster ==
2022 Northwestern Wildcats football team roster
Players
Coaches
Offense

Pos.	#	Name	Class
QB	0	Cole Freeman	So
WR	1	Raymond Niro II	Sr
QB	3	Ryan Hilinski	Jr
RB	4	Cam Porter	Jr
WR	5	Jacob Gill	So
WR	6	Malik Washington	Sr
RB	7	Anthony Tyus III	So
WR	8	Wayne Dennis Jr.	Jr
QB	9	Carl Richardson	Jr
QB	10	Brendan Sullivan	So
RB	11	Andrew Clair	GS
QB	12	Jack Lausch	Fr
WR	13	Preston Bacon	Jr
WR	14	Donnie Gray	So
WR	15	Calvin Johnson II	So
WR	17	Bryce Kirtz	Jr
WR	18	Genson Hooper Price	Jr
WR	19	Reggie Fleurima	Fr
RB	20	Joseph Himon II	Fr
RB	22	Connor Newhouse	Jr
RB	26	Evan Hull	Jr
RB	29	Marcus Cisco	Jr
RB	31	Jake Arthurs	Jr
RB	39	Albert Kunickis III	Fr
OL	55	Conrad Rowley	Sr
OL	56	Josh Thompson	So
OL	62	Max Skidmore	Jr
OL	63	Dom D'Antonio	Jr
OL	65	Jackson Carsello	So
OL	66	Braeden Edwards	So
OL	68	Josh Priebe	Jr
OL	69	Charlie Schmidt	Sr
OL	71	Ben Wrather	Jr
OL	72	Caleb Tiernan	So
OL	73	Deuce McGuire	Fr
OL	74	Nick Herzog	Fr
OL	75	Vincent Picozzi	GS
OL	76	Ethan Wiederkehr	GS
OL	77	Peter Skoronski	Jr
OL	78	Luke Trifunovic	Jr
OL	79	Zachary Franks	Jr
WR	80	Donny Navarro III	Sr
TE	81	Chris Petrucci	Fr
WR	82	Jasper Stratton	So
TE	83	Blake Van Buren	Fr
TE	84	Hunter Welcing	Jr
WR	85	Jack Kennedy	Jr
TE	86	Lawson Albright	So
TE	87	Thomas Gordon	Jr
TE	88	Marshall Lang	Jr
TE	89	Charlie Mangieri	GS

Defense

Pos.	#	Name	Class
DB	0	Coco Azema	Jr
DB	2	Cameron Mitchell	Jr
DB	3	Jaheem Joseph	Jr
LB	4	Wendell Davis Jr.	Jr
CB	7	Ore Adeyi	So
DL	8	Ryan Johnson	GS
DB	9	Jeremiah Lewis	Sr
CB	10	Theran Johnson	So
CB	11	A. J. Hampton	Sr
DB	12	Nigel Williams	Jr
DB	13	Garnett Hollis Jr.	Jr
S	18	Garner Wallace	So
DB	20	Trent Carrington	GS
DB	21	Tyler Haskins	Jr
DB	22	Evan Smith	Fr
DB	23	Devin Turner	Fr
DB	24	Rod Heard II	Jr
DB	27	Jack Oyola	Fr
DB	28	Braden Turner	Fr
DB	31	Robert Fitzgerald	Fr
LB	32	Bryce Gallagher	Jr
LB	33	Braydon Brus	Fr
LB	34	Xander Mueller	Jr
LB	35	Kenny Soares Jr.	Fr
LB	36	Declan Carr	GS
LB	37	Mac Uihlein	So
DB	38	Joe DeHaan	Jr
LB	40	Jason Reynolds II	Fr
DL	41	Jaylen Pate	GS
DL	42	Anto Saka	Fr
LB	44	Khalid Jones	Sr
LB	45	Cullen Coleman	Jr
DL	46	Devin O'Rourke	Sr
LB	48	Owen Bergin	Jr
DL	50	P. J. Spencer	Jr
LB	51	Miles Crutchley	Fr
DL	52	Jordan Butler	Jr
DE	53	Jaiden Cameron	Jr
DL	54	Henrik Barndt	Sr
LB	57	Greyson Metz	Jr
DL	58	Peyton Warford	Fr
DL	60	Carmine Bastone	So
DL	90	Taishan Holmes	Sr
DL	91	Aidan Hubbard	So
DL	93	Brendan Flakes	Fr
DT	94	Jason Gold Jr.	Sr
DL	95	Najee Story	So
DL	96	Austin Firestone	Fr
DL	97	Sean McLaughlin	Jr
DL	98	Duke Olges	Jr
DL	99	Adetomiwa Adebawore	Sr

Special teams

Pos.	#	Name	Class
LS	43	Will Halkyard	Jr
P	47	Luke Akers	Jr
K/P	49	Jacob Tabibian	So
K	90	Adam Stage	Sr
K	92	Jack Olsen	Jr
P	99	Hunter Renner	Jr

Head coach

- Pat Fitzgerald

Coordinators/assistant coaches

- Mike Bajakian – Offensive coordinator/Quarterbacks
- Jim O'Neil – Defensive coordinator
- Kurt Anderson – Offensive Line
- Lou Ayeni – Running backs/Recruiting coordinator
- Jeff Genyk – Special teams coordinator/Tight ends
- Marty Long – Defensive line
- Matt MacPherson – Associate head coach/Defensive backs
- Tim McGarigle – Linebackers
- Ryan Smith – Cornerbacks
- Dennis Springer – Wide receivers

Legend

- (C) Team captain
- (S) Suspended
- (I) Ineligible
- Injured
- Redshirt

Roster
