= 2021 Northwestern Wildcats football team =

American college football season

2021 Northwestern Wildcats football
- Conference: Big Ten Conference
- West Division
- Record: 3–9 (1–8 Big Ten)
- Head coach: Pat Fitzgerald (16th season)
- Offensive coordinator: Mike Bajakian (2nd season)
- Offensive scheme: Spread
- Defensive coordinator: Jim O'Neil (1st season)
- Base defense: 4–3/3–4 hybrid
- Home stadium: Ryan Field

2021 Big Ten Conference football standings
	Conf.			Overall
Team	W		L	W		L
East Division
No. 3 Michigan xy$^	8	–	1	12	–	2
No. 6 Ohio State x	8	–	1	11	–	2
No. 9 Michigan State	7	–	2	11	–	2
Penn State	4	–	5	7	–	6
Maryland	3	–	6	7	–	6
Rutgers	2	–	7	5	–	8
Indiana	0	–	9	2	–	10
West Division
No. 23 Iowa xy	7	–	2	10	–	4
Minnesota	6	–	3	9	–	4
Wisconsin	6	–	3	9	–	4
Purdue	6	–	3	9	–	4
Illinois	4	–	5	5	–	7
Nebraska	1	–	8	3	–	9
Northwestern	1	–	8	3	–	9
Championship: Michigan 42, Iowa 3
^ – College Football Playoff participant; $ – Conference champion; x – Division champion/co-champions; y – Championship game participant; Rankings from AP Poll

The 2021 Northwestern Wildcats football team represented Northwestern University during the 2021 NCAA Division I FBS football season. The Wildcats played their home games at Ryan Field in Evanston, Illinois, and competed in the West Division of the Big Ten Conference. They were led by 16th-year head coach Pat Fitzgerald. They finished the season 3–9, 1–8 in Big Ten play to finish in a tie for last place in the West division.

== Schedule ==
Date	Time	Opponent	Site	TV	Result	Attendance
September 3	8:00 p.m.	Michigan State	Ryan Field; Evanston, IL	ESPN	L 21–38	34,248
September 11	11:00 a.m.	Indiana State*	Ryan Field; Evanston, IL	BTN	W 24–6	26,181
September 18	3:00 p.m.	at Duke*	Wallace Wade Stadium; Durham, NC	ACCN	L 23–30	12,323
September 25	11:00 a.m.	Ohio*	Ryan Field; Evanston, IL	BTN	W 35–6	27,129
October 2	6:30 p.m.	at Nebraska	Memorial Stadium; Lincoln, NE	BTN	L 7–56	87,364
October 16	11:00 a.m.	Rutgers^{†}	Ryan Field; Evanston, IL	BTN	W 21–7	30,218
October 23	11:00 a.m.	at No. 6 Michigan	Michigan Stadium; Ann Arbor, MI (George Jewett Trophy)	FOX	L 7–33	109,449
October 30	2:30 p.m.	Minnesota	Ryan Field; Evanston, IL	BTN	L 14–41	28,158
November 6	6:00 p.m.	No. 22 Iowa	Ryan Field; Evanston, IL	BTN	L 12–17	38,141
November 13	11:00 a.m.	at No. 18 Wisconsin	Camp Randall Stadium; Madison, WI	ESPN2	L 7–35	73,194
November 20	11:00 a.m.	Purdue	Wrigley Field; Chicago, IL	BTN	L 14–32	31,500
November 27	2:30 p.m.	at Illinois	Memorial Stadium; Champaign, IL (Land of Lincoln Trophy)	BTN	L 14–47	27,624
*Non-conference game; ^{†}Homecoming; Rankings from AP and CFP Rankings after November 2; All times are in Central time

== Roster ==
2021 Northwestern Wildcats football team roster
Players
Coaches
Offense

Pos.	#	Name	Class
QB	0	Cole Freeman	Fr
WR	2	Jordan Mosley	Fr
WR	3	J. J. Jefferson	Sr
WR	4	Berkeley Holman	Sr
WR	5	Stephon Robinson Jr.	GS
WR	6	Malik Washington	Jr
QB	7	Andrew Marty	Sr
WR	8	Wayne Dennis Jr.	So
QB	9	Carl Richardson	So
QB	10	Brendan Sullivan	Fr
RB	11	Andrew Clair	GS
QB	12	Ryan Hilinski	So
WR	13	Preston Bacon	So
WR	14	Donnie Gray	Fr
QB	15	Hunter Johnson	Sr
QB	16	Zac Krause	So
WR	17	Bryce Kirtz	So
WR	18	Genson Hooper Price	So
WR	19	Jacob Gill	Fr
RB	20	Cam Porter	So
RB	22	Connor Newhouse	So
WR	23	Raymond Niro II	Jr
RB	26	Evan Hull	So
RB	27	Anthony Tyus III	Fr
RB	29	Marcus Cisco	So
RB	31	Jake Arthurs	So
QB	35	Jasper Stratton	Fr
OL	52	Sam Gerak	Sr
OL	55	Conrad Rowley	Jr
OL	56	Josh Thompson	Fr
OL	62	Max Skidmore	So
OL	63	Dom D'Antonio	So
OL	65	Jackson Carsello	Fr
OL	66	Braeden Edwards	Fr
OL	68	Josh Priebe	So
OL	69	Charlie Schmidt	Jr
OL	71	Ben Wrather	So
OL	72	Caleb Tiernan	Fr
OL	74	Payne He'Bert	Jr
OL	75	Connor Foster	So
OL	76	Ethan Wiederkehr	Sr
OL	77	Peter Skoronski	So
OL	78	Luke Trifunovic	So
OL	79	Zachary Franks	So
TE	80	Trey Pugh	Sr
WR	81	Calvin Johnson II	Fr
WR	82	Braeden Heald	Jr
WR	83	Will Lansbury	Sr
TE	84	Hunter Welcing	So
WR	85	Jack Kennedy	So
TE	86	Lawson Albright	Fr
TE	87	Thomas Gordon	So
WR	87	Jack Moses	So
TE	88	Marshall Lang	So
TE	89	Charlie Mangieri	Sr

Defense

Pos.	#	Name	Class
DB	0	Coco Azema	So
DL	1	Joe Spivak	GS
DB	2	Cameron Mitchell	So
DL	5	Jeffery Pooler Jr.	GS
CB	7	Ore Adeyi	Fr
DT	8	Te-Rah Edwards	So
DB	9	Donovan Sermons	Sr
CB	10	Theran Johnson	Fr
CB	11	A. J. Hampton	Jr
DB	12	Nigel Williams	So
DB	13	Garnett Hollis Jr.	So
S	16	Brandon Joseph	So
S	18	Garner Wallace	Fr
DB	20	Trent Carrington	GS
DB	21	Tyler Haskins	So
DB	22	Bryce Jackson	Sr
DB	24	Rod Heard II	So
DB	25	Jaheem Joseph	So
LB	28	Chris Bergin	GS
LB	31	Jaylen Rivers	Jr
LB	32	Bryce Gallagher	So
LB	33	Michael Jansey Jr.	So
LB	34	Xander Mueller	So
LB	37	Mac Uihlein	Fr
DB	38	Joe DeHaan	So
DL	39	Aidan Hubbard	Fr
LB	40	Peter McIntyre	Sr
LB	41	Grayson Mann	Jr
LB	44	Khalid Jones	Jr
LB	45	Cullen Coleman	So
DL	46	Devin O'Rourke	Jr
LB	47	Troy Hudetz	GS
LB	48	Owen Bergin	So
DL	50	P. J. Spencer	So
DL	52	Jordan Butler	So
DE	53	Jaiden Cameron	So
DL	54	Jeremy Meiser	GS
LB	57	Greyson Metz	So
DL	58	Najee Story	Fr
DL	60	Carmine Bastone	Fr
DL	90	Wyatt Blake	Jr
DL	91	Samdup Miller	GS
DT	94	Jason Gold Jr.	Jr
DT	96	Trevor Kent	Jr
DL	97	Sean McLaughlin	So
DL	98	Duke Olges	So
DL	99	Adetomiwa Adebawore	Jr

Special teams

Pos.	#	Name	Class
K	14	Charlie Kuhbander	GS
K/P	15	Trey Finison	Jr
P	36	Derek Adams	GS
LS	43	Will Halkyard	So
P	46	Hunter Renner	So
LS	48	Peter Snodgrass	Sr
K/P	49	Jacob Tabibian	Fr
P	90	Jake Genyk	Jr
K	92	Jack Olsen	So

Head coach

- Pat Fitzgerald

Coordinators/assistant coaches

- Mike Bajakian – Offensive coordinator/Quarterbacks
- Jim O'Neil – Defensive coordinator
- Kurt Anderson – Offensive Line
- Lou Ayeni – Running backs/Recruiting coordinator
- Jeff Genyk – Special teams coordinator
- Marty Long – Defensive line
- Matt MacPherson – Associate head coach/Defensive backs
- Tim McGarigle – Linebackers
- Dennis Springer – Wide receivers
- Bob Heffner – Tight ends

Legend

- (C) Team captain
- (S) Suspended
- (I) Ineligible
- Injured
- Redshirt

Roster

== Rankings ==
Ranking movements Legend: RV = Received votes
	Week															
Poll	Pre	1	2	3	4	5	6	7	8	9	10	11	12	13	14	Final
AP	RV															
Coaches	RV															
CFP	Not released															Not released
