= 2024 Northwestern Wildcats football team =

American college football season

2024 Northwestern Wildcats football
- Conference: Big Ten Conference
- Record: 4–8 (2–7 Big Ten)
- Head coach: David Braun (2nd season)
- Offensive coordinator: Zach Lujan (1st season)
- Offensive scheme: Spread
- Defensive coordinator: Tim McGarigle (1st season)
- Base defense: Multiple 4–3
- Home stadium: Martin Stadium; Wrigley Field

Uniform

2024 Big Ten Conference football standings
	Conf.			Overall
Team	W		L	W		L
No. 3 Oregon y$^	9	–	0	13	–	1
No. 10 Indiana ^	8	–	1	11	–	2
No. 5 Penn State y^	8	–	1	13	–	3
No. 1 Ohio State #^	7	–	2	14	–	2
No. 16 Illinois	6	–	3	10	–	3
Iowa	6	–	3	8	–	5
Michigan	5	–	4	8	–	5
Minnesota	5	–	4	8	–	5
USC	4	–	5	7	–	6
Rutgers	4	–	5	7	–	6
Washington	4	–	5	6	–	7
Nebraska	3	–	6	7	–	6
UCLA	3	–	6	5	–	7
Wisconsin	3	–	6	5	–	7
Northwestern	2	–	7	4	–	8
Maryland	1	–	8	4	–	8
Michigan State†	0	–	6	0	–	7
Purdue	0	–	9	1	–	11
Championship: Oregon 45, Penn State 37
# – College Football Playoff champion; ^ – College Football Playoff participant; $ – Conference champion; y – Championship game participant; † — NCAA vacated all wins for Michigan State (5–7, 3–6); Rankings from AP Poll

The 2024 Northwestern Wildcats football team represented Northwestern University as a member of the Big Ten Conference during the 2024 NCAA Division I FBS football season. They were led by second-year head coach David Braun. The team played five of its seven home games at a temporary facility constructed at the university's Martin Stadium, with two home games being played at Wrigley Field (the home of the Chicago Cubs) while a permanent replacement for the former Ryan Field was built.

== Schedule ==
Date	Time	Opponent	Site	TV	Result	Attendance
August 31	2:30 p.m.	Miami (OH)*	Martin Stadium; Evanston, IL	BTN	W 13–6	12,023
September 6	8:00 p.m.	Duke*	Martin Stadium; Evanston, IL	FS1	L 20–26 ^{2OT}	11,062
September 14	6:30 p.m.	Eastern Illinois*	Martin Stadium; Evanston, IL	BTN	W 31–7	10,631
September 21	6:00 p.m.	at Washington	Husky Stadium; Seattle, WA	FS1	L 5–24	69,788
October 5	2:30 p.m.	No. 23 Indiana	Martin Stadium; Evanston, IL	BTN	L 24–41	12,023
October 11	7:00 p.m.	at Maryland	SECU Stadium; College Park, MD	FS1	W 37–10	39,371
October 19	11:00 a.m.	Wisconsin	Martin Stadium; Evanston, IL	BTN	L 3–23	12,023
October 26	2:30 p.m.	at Iowa	Kinnick Stadium; Iowa City, IA	BTN	L 14–40	69,250
November 2	11:00 a.m.	at Purdue	Ross–Ade Stadium; West Lafayette, IN	BTN	W 26–20 ^{OT}	61,141
November 16	11:00 a.m.	No. 2 Ohio State^{†}	Wrigley Field; Chicago, IL	BTN	L 7–31	38,147
November 23	2:30 p.m.	at Michigan	Michigan Stadium; Ann Arbor, MI (George Jewett Trophy)	FS1	L 6–50	109,830
November 30	11:00 a.m.	No. 23 Illinois	Wrigley Field; Chicago, IL (rivalry)	BTN	L 28–38	26,378
*Non-conference game; ^{†}Homecoming; Rankings from AP Poll - Released prior to game; All times are in Central time; Source:

== Game summaries ==
=== vs Miami (OH) ===
Miami RedHawks (0–0) vs Northwestern Wildcats (0–0) – Game summary

Quarter	1	2	3	4	Total
RedHawks	3	0	0	3	6
Wildcats	3	0	7	3	13

at Martin Stadium • Evanston, Illinois

- Date: August 31
- Game time: 2:30 p.m. CDT
- Game weather: Sunny • Temperature: 81 °F (27 °C) • Wind: S at 5 miles per hour (8.0 km/h)
- Game attendance: 12,023
- Referee: Sergio DeHoyos
- TV announcers (BTN): Lisa Byington (play-by-play), Jared Thomas (analyst), and Kylen Mills (sideline reporter)
- Box score, Recap

Game information

First quarter

- (7:21) NU – Jack Olsen 45-yard field goal (Drive: 5 plays, 20 yards, 2:20; Northwestern 3–0)
- (1:23) M-OH – Dom Dzioban 43-yard field goal (Drive: 11 plays, 56 yards, 5:54; Tied 3–3)

Second quarter

- No scoring plays

Third quarter

- (9:42) NU – Mike Wright 13-yard run, Jack Olsen kick (Drive: 8 plays, 62 yards, 4:10; Northwestern 10–3)

Fourth quarter

- (14:47) NU – Jack Olsen 38-yard field goal (Drive: 10 plays, 77 yards, 4:42; Northwestern 13–3)
- (7:28) M-OH – Dom Dzioban 26-yard field goal (Drive: 8 plays, 62 yards, 3:42; Northwestern 13–6)

Statistics	M-OH	NU
First downs	17	20
Plays–yards	61–267	61–328
Rushes–yards	23–40	30–150
Passing yards	227	178
Passing: comp–att–int	22–37–2	18–30–0
Time of possession	34:03	25:57

Team	Category	Player	Statistics
Miami (OH)	Passing	Brett Gabbert	22/37, 227 yards, 2 INT
Miami (OH)	Rushing	Jordan Brunson	8 carries, 33 yards
Miami (OH)	Receiving	Cade McDonald	8 receptions, 105 yards
Northwestern	Passing	Mike Wright	18/30, 178 yards
Northwestern	Rushing	Mike Wright	9 carries, 65 yards, 1 TD
Northwestern	Receiving	Bryce Kirtz	6 receptions, 91 yards

=== vs Duke ===
Duke Blue Devils (1–0) vs Northwestern Wildcats (1–0) – Game summary

Quarter	1	2	3	4	OT	2OT	Total
Blue Devils	7	0	3	3	7	6	26
Wildcats	3	7	0	3	7	0	20

at Martin Stadium • Evanston, Illinois

- Date: September 6
- Game time: 8:00 p.m. CDT
- Game weather: Cloudy • Temperature: 63 °F (17 °C) • Wind: N at 15 miles per hour (24 km/h)
- Game attendance: 11,062
- Referee: Marcus Woods
- TV announcers (FS1): Connor Onion (play-by-play) and Mark Helfrich (analyst)
- Box score, Recap

Game information

First quarter

- (11:46) NU – Jack Olsen 44-yard field goal (Drive: 7 plays, 62 yards, 3:14; Northwestern 3–0)
- (4:50) DUKE – Eli Pancol 16-yard pass from Maalik Murphy, Todd Pelino kick (Drive: 4 plays, 29 yards, 1:23; Duke 7–3)

Second quarter

- (6:32) NU – Cam Porter 4-yard run, Jack Olsen kick (Drive: 2 plays, 11 yards, 0:53; Northwestern 10–7)

Third quarter

- (7:00) DUKE – Todd Pelino 49-yard field goal (Drive: 8 plays, 22 yards, 3:31; Tied 10–10)

Fourth quarter

- (11:39) NU – Jack Olsen 35-yard field goal (Drive: 11 plays, 43 yards, 5:13; Northwestern 13–10)
- (0:14) DUKE – Todd Pelino 22-yard field goal (Drive: 11 plays, 51 yards, 1:46; Tied 13–13)

Overtime

- NU – Cam Porter 10-yard run, Jack Olsen kick (Drive: 4 plays, 25 yards; Northwestern 20–13)
- DUKE – Jordan Moore 25-yard pass from Maalik Murphy, Todd Pelino kick (Drive: 1 play, 25 yards; Tied 20–20)

Second overtime

- DUKE – Eli Pancol 3-yard pass from Maalik Murphy, two-point pass failed (Drive: 2 plays, 25 yards; Duke 26–20)

Statistics	DUKE	NU
First downs	18	19
Plays–yards	70–343	73–288
Rushes–yards	30–93	37–132
Passing yards	250	156
Passing: comp–att–int	25–40–1	19–35–1
Time of possession	28:47	31:13

Team	Category	Player	Statistics
Duke	Passing	Maalik Murphy	24/39, 243 yards, 3 TD, 1 INT
Duke	Rushing	Star Thomas	17 carries, 58 yards
Duke	Receiving	Jordan Moore	11 receptions, 121 yards, 1 TD
Northwestern	Passing	Mike Wright	19/35, 156 yards, 1 INT
Northwestern	Rushing	Cam Porter	16 carries, 94 yards, 2 TD
Northwestern	Receiving	A. J. Henning	8 receptions, 52 yards

=== vs Eastern Illinois (FCS) ===
Eastern Illinois Panthers (FCS) (1–1) vs Northwestern Wildcats (1–1) – Game summary

Quarter	1	2	3	4	Total
Panthers (FCS)	0	7	0	0	7
Wildcats	7	7	10	7	31

at Martin Stadium • Evanston, Illinois

- Date: September 14
- Game time: 6:30 p.m. CDT
- Game weather: Sunny
- Game attendance: 10,631
- Referee: Gregory Blum
- TV announcers (BTN): Jason Ross Jr. (play-by-play), Matt Millen (analyst), and Kylen Mills (sideline reporter)
- Box score, Recap

Game information

First quarter

- (1:22) NU – Cam Porter 1-yard run, Jack Olsen kick (Drive: 11 plays, 80 yards, 4:57; Northwestern 7–0)

Second quarter

- (10:37) EIU – Eli Mirza 13-yard pass from Pierce Holley, Drew Schiller kick (Drive: 12 plays, 75 yards, 5:45; Tied 7–7)
- (0:14) NU – Joseph Himon II 32-yard run, Jack Olsen kick (Drive: 8 plays, 80 yards, 1:33; Northwestern 14–7)

Third quarter

- (8:18) NU – Jack Olsen 46-yard field goal (Drive: 9 plays, 64 yards, 5:38; Northwestern 17–7)
- (2:39) NU – A. J. Henning 3-yard pass from Jack Lausch, Jack Olsen kick (Drive: 7 plays, 42 yards, 4:10; Northwestern 24–7)

Fourth quarter

- (6:58) NU – Marshall Lang 9-yard pass from Jack Lausch, Jack Olsen kick (Drive: 6 plays, 79 yards, 4:08; Northwestern 31–7)

Statistics	EIU	NU
First downs	13	22
Plays–yards	51–207	67–450
Rushes–yards	20–40	35–203
Passing yards	167	247
Passing: comp–att–int	17–31–1	21–32–0
Time of possession	24:28	35:32

Team	Category	Player	Statistics
Eastern Illinois	Passing	Pierce Holley	17/31, 167 yards, 1 TD, 1 INT
Eastern Illinois	Rushing	Jay Pearson	8 carries, 29 yards
Eastern Illinois	Receiving	Cooper Willman	6 receptions, 66 yards
Northwestern	Passing	Jack Lausch	20/31, 227 yards, 2 TD
Northwestern	Rushing	Cam Porter	15 carries, 77 yards, 1 TD
Northwestern	Receiving	A. J. Henning	7 receptions, 117 yards, 1 TD

=== at Washington ===
Northwestern Wildcats (2–1) at Washington Huskies (2–1) – Game summary

Quarter	1	2	3	4	Total
Wildcats	0	2	3	0	5
Huskies	7	10	0	7	24

at Husky Stadium • Seattle, Washington

- Date: September 21
- Game time: 6:00 p.m. CDT
- Game weather: Sunny • Temperature: 68 °F (20 °C) • Wind: N at 6 miles per hour (9.7 km/h)
- Game attendance: 69,788
- Referee: Jeffrey Servinski
- TV announcers (FS1): Alex Faust (play-by-play) and Robert Smith (analyst)
- Box score, Recap

Game information

First quarter

- (7:57) WASH – Denzel Boston 46-yard pass from Will Rogers, Grady Gross kick (Drive: 6 plays, 73 yards, 2:39; Washington 7–0)

Second quarter

- (14:11) WASH – Grady Gross 21-yard field goal (Drive: 11 plays, 88 yards, 5:36; Washington 10–0)
- (10:12) WASH – Denzel Boston 13-yard pass from Will Rogers, Grady Gross kick (Drive: 4 plays, 31 yards, 1:59; Washington 17–0)
- (6:38) NU – Intentional grounding enforced on Will Rogers in the end zone for a safety (Washington 17–2)

Third quarter

- (5:07) NU – Jack Olsen 18-yard field goal (Drive: 8 plays, 32 yards, 4:16; Washington 17–5)

Fourth quarter

- (14:02) WASH – Jonah Coleman 8-yard run, Grady Gross kick (Drive: 11 plays, 77 yards, 5:58; Washington 24–5)

Statistics	NU	WASH
First downs	12	22
Plays–yards	53–112	69–391
Rushes–yards	26–59	38–144
Passing yards	53	247
Passing: comp–att–int	8–27–2	22–30–0
Time of possession	27:08	32:52

Team	Category	Player	Statistics
Northwestern	Passing	Jack Lausch	8/27, 53 yards, 2 INT
Northwestern	Rushing	Jack Lausch	13 carries, 21 yards
Northwestern	Receiving	A. J. Henning	5 receptions, 41 yards
Washington	Passing	Will Rogers	20/28, 223 yards, 2 TD
Washington	Rushing	Jonah Coleman	15 carries, 67 yards, 1 TD
Washington	Receiving	Denzel Boston	7 receptions, 121 yards, 2 TD

=== vs No. 23 Indiana ===
No. 23 Indiana Hoosiers (5–0) vs Northwestern Wildcats (2–2) – Game summary

Quarter	1	2	3	4	Total
No. 23 Hoosiers	7	10	7	17	41
Wildcats	0	10	7	7	24

at Martin Stadium • Evanston, Illinois

- Date: October 5
- Game time: 2:30 p.m. CDT
- Game weather: Sunny • Temperature: 76 °F (24 °C) • Wind: SE at 15 miles per hour (24 km/h)
- Game attendance: 12,023
- Referee: Jerry McGinn
- TV announcers (BTN): Chris Vosters (play-by-play), Anthony Herron (analyst), and Dannie Rogers (sideline reporter)
- Box score, Recap

Game information

First quarter

- (0:44) IU – Justice Ellison 5-yard run, Nicolas Radicic kick (Drive: 10 plays, 89 yards, 5:26; Indiana 7–0)

Second quarter

- (8:48) NU – Cam Porter 8-yard run, Jack Olsen kick (Drive: 10 plays, 53 yards, 6:51; Tied 7–7)
- (4:28) IU – Miles Cross 7-yard pass from Kurtis Rourke, Nicolas Radicic kick (Drive: 8 plays, 75 yards, 4:20; Indiana 14–7)
- (1:08) NU – Jack Olsen 32-yard field goal (Drive: 7 plays, 61 yards, 3:20; Indiana 14–10)
- (0:03) IU – Nicolas Radicic 37-yard field goal (Drive: 8 plays, 56 yards, 1:05; Indiana 17–10)

Third quarter

- (6:44) IU – Ke'Shawn Williams 13-yard pass from Kurtis Rourke, Nicolas Radicic kick (Drive: 9 plays, 87 yards, 4:55; Indiana 24–10)
- (3:13) NU – A. J. Henning 38-yard pass from Jack Lausch, Jack Olsen kick (Drive: 7 plays, 75 yards, 3:31; Indiana 24–17)

Fourth quarter

- (14:54) IU – Nicolas Radicic 28-yard field goal (Drive: 8 plays, 65 yards, 3:19; Indiana 27–17)
- (11:19) NU – A. J. Henning 2-yard pass from Jack Lausch, Jack Olsen kick (Drive: 6 plays, 61 yards, 3:30; Indiana 27–24)
- (6:23) IU – Ty Son Lawton 1-yard run, Nicolas Radicic kick (Drive: 10 plays, 75 yards, 4:56; Indiana 34–24)
- (3:28) IU – Zach Horton 4-yard pass from Kurtis Rourke, Nicolas Radicic kick (Drive: 5 plays, 36 yards, 1:45; Indiana 41–24)

Statistics	IU	NU
First downs	27	17
Plays–yards	68–529	60–336
Rushes–yards	32–149	22–93
Passing yards	380	243
Passing: comp–att–int	25–33–0	23–38–0
Time of possession	32:09	27:51

Team	Category	Player	Statistics
Indiana	Passing	Kurtis Rourke	25/33, 380 yards, 3 TD
Indiana	Rushing	Justice Ellison	14 carries, 68 yards, 1 TD
Indiana	Receiving	Elijah Sarratt	7 receptions, 135 yards
Northwestern	Passing	Jack Lausch	23/38, 243 yards, 2 TD
Northwestern	Rushing	Joseph Himon II	5 carries, 35 yards
Northwestern	Receiving	Bryce Kirtz	10 receptions, 128 yards

=== at Maryland ===
Northwestern Wildcats (2–3) at Maryland Terrapins (3–2) – Game summary

Quarter	1	2	3	4	Total
Wildcats	7	10	0	20	37
Terrapins	0	7	0	3	10

at SECU Stadium • College Park, Maryland

- Date: October 11
- Game time: 7:00 p.m. CDT
- Game weather: Clear • Temperature: 58 °F (14 °C) • Wind: SW at 2 miles per hour (3.2 km/h)
- Game attendance: 39,371
- Referee: Chris Coyle
- TV announcers (FS1): Connor Onion (play-by-play) and Mark Helfrich (analyst)
- Box score, Recap

Game information

First quarter

- (8:03) NU – Jack Lausch 9-yard run, Luke Akers kick (Drive: 7 plays, 62 yards, 4:31; Northwestern 7–0)

Second quarter

- (12:08) NU – Cam Porter 3-yard run, Luke Akers kick (Drive: 10 plays, 92 yards, 6:08; Northwestern 14–0)
- (10:50) NU – Luke Akers 43-yard field goal (Drive: 4 plays, -3 yards, 1:12; Northwestern 17–0)
- (3:22) UMD – Billy Edwards Jr. 1-yard run, Jack Howes kick (Drive: 16 plays, 90 yards, 7:25; Northwestern 17–7)

Third quarter

- No scoring plays

Fourth quarter

- (14:57) UMD – Jack Howes 31-yard field goal (Drive: 18 plays, 86 yards, 9:28; Northwestern 17–10)
- (13:17) NU – Aidan Hubbard 2-yard fumble return, Luke Akers kick (Northwestern 24–10)
- (8:55) NU – Luke Akers 38-yard field goal (Drive: 5 plays, 60 yards, 2:10; Northwestern 27–10)
- (6:23) NU – Luke Akers 38-yard field goal (Drive: 7 plays, 12 yards, 2:25; Northwestern 30–10)
- (4:30) NU – Jake Arthurs 9-yard run, Luke Akers kick (Drive: 3 plays, 20 yards, 1:35; Northwestern 37–10)

Statistics	NU	MD
First downs	10	25
Plays–yards	52–283	85–355
Rushes–yards	31–80	33–59
Passing yards	203	296
Passing: comp–att–int	10–18–0	28–51–1
Time of possession	26:09	33:51

Team	Category	Player	Statistics
Northwestern	Passing	Jack Lausch	10/18, 203 yards
Northwestern	Rushing	Caleb Komolafe	7 carries, 29 yards
Northwestern	Receiving	Bryce Kirtz	3 receptions, 123 yards
Maryland	Passing	Billy Edwards Jr.	28/51, 296 yards, 1 INT
Maryland	Rushing	Roman Hemby	14 carries, 42 yards
Maryland	Receiving	Kaden Prather	8 receptions, 81 yards

=== vs Wisconsin ===
Wisconsin Badgers (4–2) vs Northwestern Wildcats (3–3) – Game summary

Quarter	1	2	3	4	Total
Badgers	0	14	7	2	23
Wildcats	0	0	3	0	3

at Martin Stadium • Evanston, Illinois

- Date: October 19
- Game time: 11:00 a.m. CDT
- Game weather: Sunny • Temperature: 61 °F (16 °C) • Wind: SW at 10 miles per hour (16 km/h)
- Game attendance: 12,023
- Referee: Kole Knueppel
- TV announcers (BTN): Jeff Levering (play-by-play), Jake Butt (analyst), and Brooke Fletcher (sideline reporter)
- Box score, Recap

Game information

First quarter

- No scoring plays

Second quarter

- (14:31) WISC – Braedyn Locke 8-yard run, Nathanial Vakos kick (Drive: 8 plays, 66 yards, 3:32; Wisconsin 7–0)
- (0:39) WISC – Cade Yacamelli 3-yard run, Nathanial Vakos kick (Drive: 1 play, 3 yards, 0:04; Wisconsin 14–0)

Third quarter

- (6:46) NU – Luke Akers 26-yard field goal (Drive: 13 plays, 59 yards, 7:18; Wisconsin 14–3)
- (0:11) WISC – Tucker Ashcraft 3-yard pass from Braedyn Locke, Nathanial Vakos kick (Drive: 8 plays, 80 yards, 4:28; Wisconsin 21–3)

Fourth quarter

- (14:52) WISC – Jack Lausch sacked in the end zone by Sebastian Cheeks and Curt Neal for a safety (Wisconsin 23–3)

Statistics	WIS	NU
First downs	19	9
Plays–yards	67–359	55–209
Rushes–yards	43–199	30–127
Passing yards	160	82
Passing: comp–att–int	14–24–1	9–24–0
Time of possession	32:51	27:09

Team	Category	Player	Statistics
Wisconsin	Passing	Braedyn Locke	14/24, 160 yards, 1 TD, 1 INT
Wisconsin	Rushing	Tawee Walker	23 carries, 126 yards
Wisconsin	Receiving	Will Pauling	5 receptions, 51 yards
Northwestern	Passing	Jack Lausch	9/24, 82 yards
Northwestern	Rushing	Jack Lausch	10 carries, 55 yards
Northwestern	Receiving	Thomas Gordon	4 receptions, 49 yards

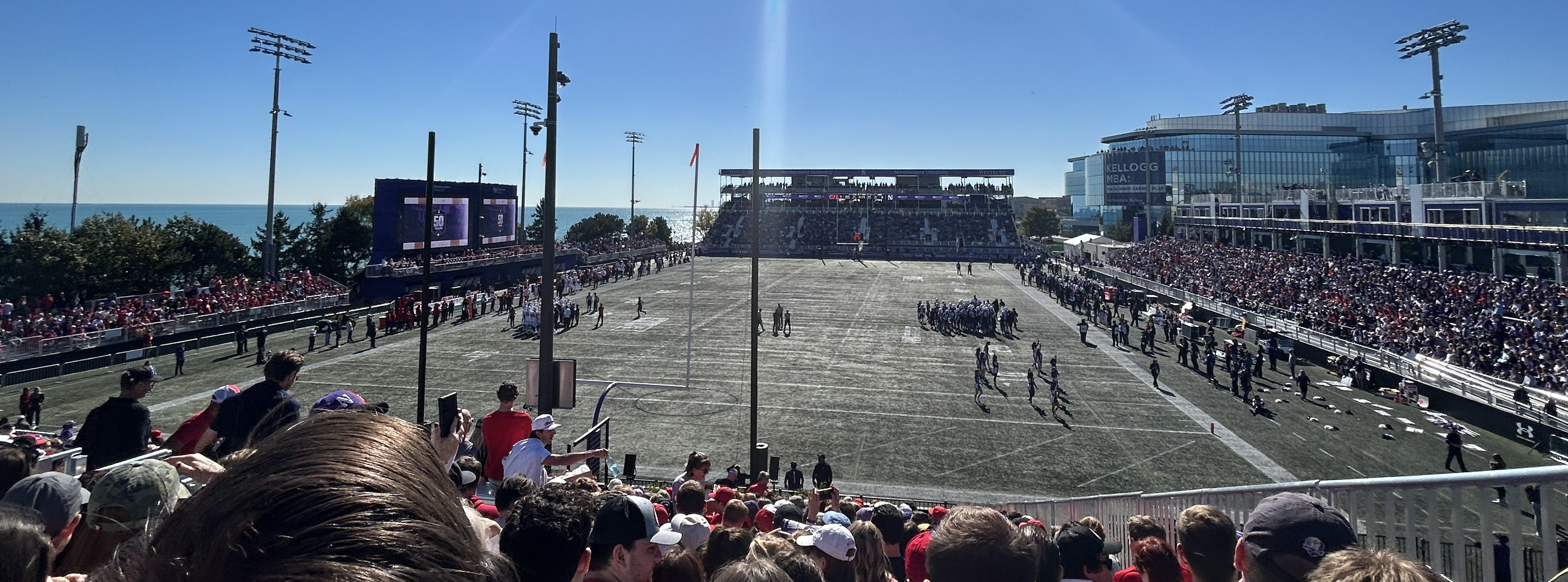
game against Wisconsin

=== at Iowa ===
Northwestern Wildcats (3–4) at Iowa Hawkeyes (4–3) – Game summary

Quarter	1	2	3	4	Total
Wildcats	0	7	0	7	14
Hawkeyes	3	9	28	0	40

at Kinnick Stadium • Iowa City, Iowa

- Date: October 26
- Game time: 2:30 p.m. CDT
- Game weather: Sunny • Temperature: 61 °F (16 °C) • Wind: E at 7 miles per hour (11 km/h)
- Game attendance: 69,250
- Referee: Chris Coyle
- TV announcers (BTN): Chris Vosters (play-by-play) and Anthony Herron (analyst)
- Box score, Recap

Game information

First quarter

- (6:10) IOWA – Drew Stevens 24-yard field goal (Drive: 10 plays, 62 yards, 4:47; Iowa 3–0)

Second quarter

- (9:31) NU – Theran Johnson 85-yard interception return, Luke Akers kick (Northwestern 7–3)
- (7:07) IOWA – Jack Lausch sacked by Max Llewellyn in the end zone for a safety (Northwestern 7–5)
- (0:39) IOWA – Kaleb Johnson 26-yard run, Drew Stevens kick (Drive: 5 plays, 52 yards, 0:43; Iowa 12–7)

Third quarter

- (11:18) IOWA – Brendan Sullivan 6-yard run, Drew Stevens kick (Drive: 7 plays, 78 yards, 3:37; Iowa 19–7)
- (8:54) IOWA – Kaden Wetjen 85-yard punt return, Drew Stevens kick (Iowa 26–7)
- (4:32) IOWA – Kaleb Johnson 41-yard run, Drew Stevens kick (Drive: 8 plays, 64 yards, 3:59; Iowa 33–7)
- (0:27) IOWA – Kaleb Johnson 25-yard run, Drew Stevens kick (Drive: 1 play, 25 yards, 0:07; Iowa 40–7)

Fourth quarter

- (6:39) NU – Drew Wagner 72-yard punt return, Luke Akers kick (Iowa 40–14)

Statistics	NU	IOWA
First downs	11	14
Plays–yards	51–163	66–355
Rushes–yards	24–43	39–203
Passing yards	120	152
Passing: comp–att–int	15–27–2	16–27–1
Time of possession	25:36	34:44

Team	Category	Player	Statistics
Northwestern	Passing	Jack Lausch	10/19, 62 yards, 2 INT
Northwestern	Rushing	Cam Porter	13 carries, 50 yards
Northwestern	Receiving	A. J. Henning	2 receptions, 22 yards
Iowa	Passing	Brendan Sullivan	9/14, 79 yards
Iowa	Rushing	Kaleb Johnson	14 carries, 109 yards, 3 TD
Iowa	Receiving	Seth Anderson	2 receptions, 44 yards

=== at Purdue ===
Northwestern Wildcats (3-5) at Purdue Boilermakers (1-6) – Game summary

Quarter	1	2	3	4	OT	Total
Northwestern	10	7	0	3	6	26
Purdue	3	7	3	7	0	20

at Ross–Ade Stadium • West Lafayette, Indiana

- Date: November 2
- Game time: 11:00 a.m. CDT
- Game weather: • Sunny Temperature: 51 °F (11 °C) • Wind: 5 mph
- Game attendance: 61,141
- Referee: Bryan Banks
- TV announcers (BTN): Jason Ross Jr (play-by-play), Matt Millen (analyst) and Kylin Mills (reporter)

Game information

First quarter

- (7:21) NU – Luke Akers 39-yard field goal (Drive: 12 plays, 48 yards, 6:18; Northwestern 3-0)
- (3:09) PUR – Spencer Porath 26-yard field goal (Drive: 10 plays, 67 yards, 4:12; 3-3)
- (0:38) NU – Joseph Himon II 51-yard run, Luke Akers kick (Drive: 6 plays, 75 yards, 2:31; Northwestern 10-3)

Second quarter

- (2:23) NU – Cam Porter 1-yard run, Luke Akers kick (Drive: 11 plays, 50 yards, 6:22; Northwestern 17-3)
- (0:25) PUR – Jahmal Edrine 6-yard pass from Hudson Card, Spencer Porath kick (Drive: 12 plays, 87 yards, 1:55; Northwestern 17-10)

Third quarter

- (2:44) PUR – Spencer Porath 24-yard field goal (Drive: 10 plays, 62 yards, 5:02; Northwestern 17-13)

Fourth quarter

- (10:14) NU – Luke Akers 41-yard field goal (Drive: 16 plays, 52 yards, 7:30; Northwestern 20-13)
- (5:16) PUR – Devin Mockobee 1-yard run, Spencer Porath kick (Drive: 11 plays, 75 yards, 4:58; 20-20)

Overtime

- NU – Joseph Himon II 22-yard pass from Jack Lausch (Drive: 2 plays, 25 yards, Northwestern 26-20)

Statistics	Northwestern	Purdue
First downs	19	16
Plays–yards	424	337
Rushes–yards	122	47
Passing yards	302	290
Passing: comp–att–int	25-39-1	25-41-0
Turnovers		
Time of possession	35:01	24:59

Team	Category	Player	Statistics
Northwestern	Passing	Jack Lausch	23/35, 250 yards, TD
Northwestern	Rushing	Joseph Himon II	6 carries, 78 yards, TD
Northwestern	Receiving	Cam Porter	8 receptions, 85 yards
Purdue	Passing	Hudson Card	21/37, 267 yards, TD
Purdue	Rushing	Devin Mockobee	10 carries, 29 yards, TD
Purdue	Receiving	Max Klare	6 receptions, 78 yards

=== vs Ohio State ===
No. 2 Ohio State Buckeyes (8-1) vs Northwestern Wildcats (4-5) – Game summary

Quarter	1	2	3	4	Total
No. 2 Ohio State	0	21	10	0	31
Northwestern	0	7	0	0	7

at Wrigley Field • Chicago, Illinois

- Date: November 16
- Game time: 11:00 a.m. CST
- Game weather: Sunny • Temperature: 52 °F (11 °C) • Wind: S at 11 miles per hour (18 km/h)
- Game attendance: 38,147
- Referee: Mark Kluczynski
- TV announcers (BTN): Jeff Levering (play-by-play), Jake Butt (analyst), and Brooke Fletcher (sideline)

Game information

First quarter

- No scoring plays

Second quarter

- (12:34) NU – Jack Lausch 8-yard run, Luke Akers kick (Drive: 13 plays, 92 yards, 5:30; Northwestern 7–0)
- (6:59) OSU – Quinshon Judkins 1-yard run, Jayden Fielding kick (Drive: 12 plays, 85 yards, 5:29; Tied 7–7)
- (4:19) OSU – Quinshon Judkins 1-yard run, Jayden Fielding kick (Drive: 2 plays, 1 yard, 0:56; Ohio State 14–7)
- (0:47) OSU – Carnell Tate 25-yard pass from Will Howard, Jayden Fielding kick (Drive: 6 plays, 77 yards, 1:57; Ohio State 21–7)

Third quarter

- (12:11) OSU – Carnell Tate 8-yard pass from Will Howard, Jayden Fielding kick (Drive: 5 plays, 90 yards, 2:44; Ohio State 28–7)
- (0:44) OSU – Jayden Fielding 28-yard field goal (Drive: 9 plays, 69 yards, 4:14; Ohio State 31–7)

Fourth quarter

- No scoring plays

Statistics	Ohio State	Northwestern
First downs	19	17
Plays–yards	57–420	66–251
Rushes–yards	33–173	28–50
Passing yards	247	201
Passing: comp–att–int	15–24–0	21–36–0
Turnovers		
Time of possession	28:00	32:00

Team	Category	Player	Statistics
Ohio State	Passing	Will Howard	15/24, 247 yards, 2 TD
Ohio State	Rushing	Quinshon Judkins	15 carries, 76 yards, 2 TD
Ohio State	Receiving	Jeremiah Smith	4 receptions, 100 yards
Northwestern	Passing	Jack Lausch	21/35, 201 yards
Northwestern	Rushing	Cam Porter	10 carries, 37 yards
Northwestern	Receiving	Bryce Kirtz	7 receptions, 92 yards

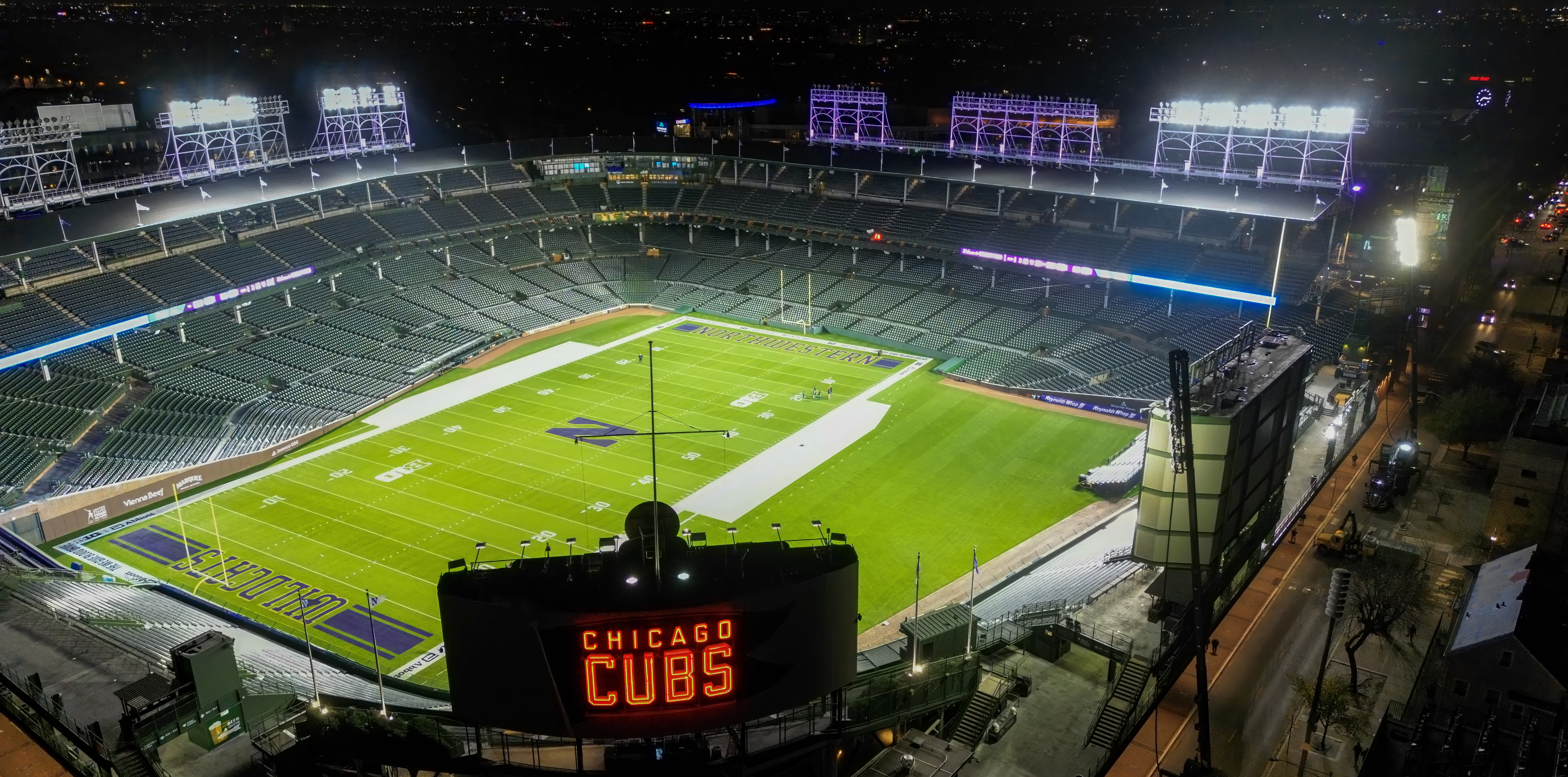
Wrigley Field set-up to host the game against Ohio State

=== at Michigan ===
Northwestern Wildcats (4-6) at Michigan Wolverines (5-5) – Game summary

Quarter	1	2	3	4	Total
Northwestern	0	6	0	0	6
Michigan	10	7	14	19	50

at Michigan Stadium • Ann Arbor, Michigan

- Date: November 23
- Game time: 2:30 p.m. CST
- Game weather: 44 °F (7 °C), sunny, NW 12 miles per hour (19 km/h)
- Game attendance: 109,830
- Referee: Jeffrey Servinski
- TV announcers (FS1): Tim Brando (pbp) Devin Gardner (Analyst) and Josh Sims (Sideline Reporter)

Game information

First quarter

- (6:44) Michigan – Kalel Mullings 1-yard run (Dominic Zvada kick) (Drive: 11 plays, 53 yards, 5:51; Michigan 7–0)
- (1:09) Michigan – Dominic Zvada 56-yard field goal (Drive: 6 plays, 10 yards, 3:52; Michigan 10–0)

Second quarter

- (6:25) Northwestern – Luke Akers 28-yard field goal (Drive: 5 plays, 10 yards, 2:11; Michigan 10–3)
- (1:57) Northwestern – Luke Akers 26-yard field goal (Drive: 5 plays, 46 yards, 2:17; Michigan 10–6)
- (0:08) Michigan – Colston Loveland 3-yard pass from Davis Warren (Dominic Zvada kick) (Drive: 11 plays, 65 yards, 1:49; Michigan 17–6)

Third quarter

- (12:10) Michigan – Kalel Mullings 10-yard run (Dominic Zvada kick) (Drive: 5 plays, 75 yards, 2:50; Michigan 24–6)
- (5:12) Michigan – Kalel Mullings 1-yard run (Dominic Zvada kick) (Drive: 10 plays, 45 yards, 5:30; Michigan 31–6)

Fourth quarter

- (13:40) Michigan – Donovan Edwards 20-yard run (Dominic Zvada kick) (Drive: 5 plays, 58 yards, 2:41; Michigan 38–6)
- (5:22) Michigan – Dominic Zvada 28-yard field goal (Drive: 14 plays, 53 yards, 7:07; Michigan 41–6)
- (4:28) Michigan – Team safety (Michigan 43–6)
- (4:10) Michigan – Tavierre Dunlap 20-yard run (Charlie Mentzer kick) (Drive: 1 play, 20 yards, 0:07; Michigan 50–6)

Statistics	Northwestern	Michigan
First downs	8	25
Plays–yards	49–127	70–396
Rushes–yards	25–10	35–201
Passing yards	117	195
Passing: comp–att–int	12–24–2	26–35–1
Turnovers		
Time of possession	24:19	35:41

Team	Category	Player	Statistics
Northwestern	Passing	Jack Lausch	10/21, 106 yards, 2 INT
Northwestern	Rushing	Cam Porter	7 carries, 24 yards
Northwestern	Receiving	Bryce Kirtz	3 receptions, 67 yards
Michigan	Passing	Davis Warren	26/35, 195 yards, TD, INT
Michigan	Rushing	Kalel Mullings	12 carries, 92 yards, 3 TD
Michigan	Receiving	Tyler Morris	7 receptions, 64 yards

=== vs No. 23 Illinois ===
No. 23 Illinois Fighting Illini (8-3) vs Northwestern Wildcats (4-7) – Game summary

Quarter	1	2	3	4	Total
No. 23 Illinois	7	7	14	10	38
Northwestern	10	0	10	8	28

at Wrigley Field • Chicago, IL

- Date: November 30
- Game time: 11:00 AM CST
- Game weather: 18 °F (−8 °C), sunny
- Game attendance: 26,378
- Referee: Kole Knueppel
- TV announcers (BTN): Chris Vosters (play-by-play), Matt Millen (analyst), and Kylen Mills (sideline)

Game information

First quarter

- (9:31) NU – Luke Akers 21-yard field goal (Drive: 12 plays, 72 yards, 5:29; Northwestern 3–0)
- (8:12) UI – Aidan Laughery 30-yard run, David Olano kick (Drive: 3 plays, 73 yards, 1:14; Illinois 7–3)
- (2:14) NU – Devin Turner 13-yard interception, Luke Akers kick (Northwestern 10–7)

Second quarter

- (13:21) UI – Luke Altmyer 1-yard run, David Olano kick (Drive: 8 plays, 65 yards, 3:46; Illinois 14–10)

Third quarter

- (14:15) UI – Aidan Laughery 64-yard run, David Olano kick (Drive: 2 plays, 69 yards, 0:39; Illinois 21–10)
- (10:08) UI – Pat Bryant 43-yard pass from Luke Altmyer, David Olano kick (Drive: 5 plays, 62 yards, 2:36; Illinois 28–10)
- (5:35) NU – Luke Akers 34-yard field goal (Drive: 10 plays, 59 yards, 4:33; Illinois 28–13)
- (1:34) NU – A. J. Henning 11-yard pass from Jack Lausch, Luke Akers kick (Drive: 5 plays, 40 yards, 2:35; Illinois 28–20)

Fourth quarter

- (12:15) UI – Aidan Laughery 31-yard run, David Olano kick (Drive: 4 plays, 42 yards, 1:54; Illinois 35–20)
- (11:06) UI – David Olano 24-yard field goal (Drive: 4 plays, 3 yards, 0:57; Illinois 38–20)
- (1:00) NU – Thomas Gordon 15-yard pass from Jack Lausch, Marshall Lang pass (Drive: 10 plays, 80 yards, 1:42; Illinois 38–28)

Statistics	Illinois	Northwestern
First downs	14	28
Plays–yards	53–382	90–442
Rushes–yards	36–212	29–113
Passing yards	170	329
Passing: comp–att–int	10–17–2	29–61–3
Turnovers		
Time of possession	25:28	34:32

Team	Category	Player	Statistics
Illinois	Passing	Luke Altmyer	10/17, 170 yards, TD, 2 INT
Illinois	Rushing	Aidan Laughery	12 carries, 172 yards, 3 TD
Illinois	Receiving	Pat Bryant	4 receptions, 70 yards, TD
Northwestern	Passing	Jack Lausch	25/48, 287 yards, 2 TD, 2 INT
Northwestern	Rushing	Cam Porter	12 carries, 53 yards
Northwestern	Receiving	A. J. Henning	10 receptions, 119 yards, TD

== Roster ==
2024 Northwestern Wildcats football team roster
Players
Coaches
Offense

Pos.	#	Name	Class
RB	1	Cam Porter	GS
TE	2	Duke Olges	GS
WR	3	Tate Crane	GS
QB	3	Ryan Hilinski	GS
QB	4	Ryan Boe	Fr
QB	5	Mike Wright	GS
RB	6	Joseph Himon II	So
WR	7	Calvin Johnson II	Sr
WR	8	A. J. Henning	GS
QB	9	Aidan Gray	Fr
WR	10	Ricky Amumaraeze	Fr
WR	11	Donnie Gray	Jr
QB	12	Jack Lausch	So
QB	15	Sean Winton	Fr
WR	16	Frank Covey IV	Fr
WR	17	Bryce Kirtz	GS
TE	18	Camp Magee	Fr
WR	19	Reggie Fleurima	So
RB	24	Dashun Reeder	Fr
RB	25	Caleb Komolafe	Fr
RB	26	Albert Kunickis III	So
RB	29	Grissim Anderson	GS
RB	31	Jake Arthurs	GS
WR	33	Carson Grove	Fr
WR	48	Drew Wagner	Fr
OL	56	Josh Thompson	Jr
OL	61	Matt Keeler	Jr
OL	62	Ezomo Oratokhai	Fr
OL	64	Anthony Birsa	Fr
OL	65	Jackson Carsello	Jr
OL	66	Braeden Edwards	Jr
OL	67	Dennis Rahouski	Fr
OL	68	Logan Uihlein	Fr
OL	69	Jake Bailey	GS
OL	70	Cooper Lovelace	GS
OL	71	Ben Wrather	GS
OL	72	Caleb Tiernan	Jr
OL	73	Deuce McGuire	So
OL	74	Nick Herzog	So
OL	76	Idrys Cotton	Fr
OL	78	Landon Lauter	Fr
OL	79	Jace Borcherding	Fr
WR	80	Hayden Eligon II	Fr
TE	81	Chris Petrucci	So
TE	83	Blake Van Buren	So
TE	84	Hunter Welcing	Jr
TE	85	Patrick Schaller	Fr
TE	86	Lawson Albright	Jr
TE	87	Thomas Gordon	GS
TE	88	Marshall Lang	GS
WR	89	Cam Russell	Fr

Defense

Pos.	#	Name	Class
DB	0	Coco Azema	GS
DL	4	Anto Saka	So
LB	5	Kenny Soares Jr.	So
DB	6	Robert Fitzgerald	So
DB	7	Ore Adeyi	Jr
DB	8	Devin Turner	Jr
DB	9	Braden Turner	So
DB	10	Theran Johnson	Jr
DB	12	Evan Smith	So
DB	13	Josh Fussell	Fr
DB	14	Joe DeHaan	GS
DL	15	Brendan Flakes	So
DB	18	Garner Wallace	Jr
DB	19	J. J. Lewis	Fr
DB	21	Damon Walters	Fr
DB	22	Terrion Curry-Hicks	Fr
DB	23	Cole Shivers	Fr
DB	26	Jalen Lewis	Fr
DB	27	Jack Oyola	So
DB	28	Timi Oke	Fr
LB	29	Qayvier Johnson	Fr
DB	31	Tito Williams Jr.	Fr
LB	32	Matthew Smith	Fr
LB	33	Braydon Brus	So
LB	34	Xander Mueller	GS
DB	35	Sean Martin	Fr
LB	36	Payton Roth	Fr
LB	37	Mac Uihlein	Jr
LB	38	Noah Taylor	GS
LB	40	Jason Reynolds II	So
DL	41	Jaylen Pate	GS
LB	42	Nigel Glover	Fr
DL	44	Callen Campbell	Fr
LB	45	Cullen Coleman	GS
DL	47	Michael Kilbain	So
LB	51	Miles Crutchley	So
DL	52	Richie Hagarty	GS
DL	53	Jaiden Cameron	Jr
DL	54	Tyler Gant	Fr
DL	55	Dylan Roberts	Fr
LB	57	Greyson Metz	GS
DL	58	Troy Regovich	Fr
DL	59	Jack Trautmann	Fr
DL	77	Henry Fioriglio	Fr
DL	90	Carmine Bastone	Jr
DL	91	Aidan Hubbard	Jr
DL	92	Mason Green	Fr
DL	94	R. J. Pearson	GS
DL	95	Najee Story	Jr
DL	96	Braxton Strong	Fr
DL	97	Sean McLaughlin	GS
DL	98	Hank Knez	GS

Special teams

Pos.	#	Name	Class
P	11	Luke Akers	Sr
LS	39	Jack Florentine	Fr
LS	43	Will Halkyard	Sr
K	49	Jacob Tabibian	Jr
K	82	Jack Olsen	Jr
K	94	Henry Helms	So
P	99	Hunter Renner	Jr

Head coach

- David Braun

Coordinators/assistant coaches

- Harlon Barnett – Assistant head coach/safeties
- Zach Lujan – Offensive coordinator/quarterbacks
- Tim McGarigle – Defensive coordinator/linebackers
- Paul Creighton – Special teams coordinator/tight ends
- Armon Binns – Wide receivers
- Chris Foster – Running backs
- LaMarcus Hicks – Cornerbacks
- Bill O'Boyle – Offensive linemen
- Christian Smith – Defensive linemen
- D. J. Vokolek – Defensive assistant
- Zach Opsal – Special teams quality control
- Logan McCormick – Graduate assistant

Legend

- (C) Team captain
- (S) Suspended
- (I) Ineligible
- Injured
- Redshirt

Roster
