= Jack Lausch =

American baseball player (born 2004)

Cincinnati Reds
- Center fielder
- Born: January 26, 2004 (age 22); Chicago, Illinois, U.S.
- Bats: Left Throws: Right
- Stats at Baseball Reference

Jack Lausch (born January 26, 2004) is an American baseball center fielder and former college football quarterback, currently in the Cincinnati Reds organization. He attended college at Northwestern, where he played for the Wildcats football and baseball teams.

== Early life ==
Lausch attended Brother Rice High School in Chicago, Illinois. For the Crusaders, he was a three sport athlete where he played baseball, basketball and football. In baseball, he was ranked the number one outfielder in the state of Illinois and the number 23 outfielder in the country by Perfect Game. In June 2021, he committed to play baseball at Notre Dame and was granted a preferred walk-on spot for football. In December, Lausch later committed to Northwestern once he was offered a football scholarship. As a senior, he threw for 2,447 yards and 20 touchdowns and rushed for 1,084 yards and 21 touchdowns. Coming out of high school, Lausch was rated as a three-star recruit. As a senior in baseball, Lausch hit a walk-off home run against IMG Academy, who was the number one team in the country at the time. He was named 2022 Chicago Catholic League Baseball Player of the Year where he hit .386 with five home runs and had 43 RBI.

== College career ==
=== Football ===
As a freshman in 2022, Lausch made his collegiate debut in the season finale against Illinois. He completed four of eight pass attempts for 68 yards and an interception.

In the 2023 season opener against UTEP, Lausch scored his first collegiate touchdown on a 6-yard run. On the season, he played in ten games where he completed two of his three passes for ten yards, while rushing 19 times for 80 yards and a touchdown, and hauling in two receptions for nine yards.

In 2024, Lausch lost the starting quarterback competition to Mississippi State transfer Mike Wright. After a 1–1 start, Lausch was named the starting quarterback. In his first collegiate start against FCS foe Eastern Illinois, he threw for 227 yards and two touchdowns and rushed seven times for 62 yards in a 31–7 win. Against Purdue, Lausch threw a game-winning touchdown pass in overtime to lead the Wildcats to victory. On the season, Lausch accounted for nine total touchdowns across ten starts.

In 2025, Lausch competed with freshman Ryan Boe and graduate transfer Preston Stone for the starting quarterback position. In July, Lausch announced he left the football program to focus on his baseball career.

=== Baseball ===
In 2021, Lausch committed to play baseball at Notre Dame before switching to Northwestern on a football scholarship. In Lausch's first three years at Northwestern, he focused solely on football. In 2025, Lausch joined the Northwestern baseball team. On February 14, 2025, in the season opener against Long Beach State, Lausch recorded his first collegiate hit and an outfield assist. On March 30, Lausch hit his first two collegiate home runs against Maryland in a three hit performance. On May 11, Lausch began a three game stretch where he hit home runs against Ohio State, Valparaiso and UCLA. Against Valparaiso, Lausch was a career high 4-for-4 at the plate. His home run marked Northwestern's 67 of the season, which set a program record. On the season, Lausch appeared in 44 games (43 starts) in centerfield and drove in 28 runs while adding 15 extra base hits.

After going undrafted in the 2025 Major League Baseball draft, Lausch played collegiate summer baseball for the Williamsport Crosscutters of the MLB Draft League.

Lausch returned in 2026 and led the Wildcats in games played, plate appearances, runs scored, hits, triples, home runs, RBI, batting average, on-base percentage, slugging percentage, OPS, and total bases. He started all 52 games and finished the season with 52 runs scored, 63 hits, 13 doubles, four triples, 16 home runs, 41 RBI, and a .312 batting average. For his performance, he earned third-team All-Big Ten honors.

== Professional baseball career ==
Lausch was selected by the Cincinnati Reds in the 17th round (512th overall) of the 2026 Major League Baseball draft.

== Career statistics ==
=== College football ===
Season	Team	Games			Passing								Rushing			
Season	Team	GP	GS	Record	Cmp	Att	Pct	Yds	Y/A	TD	Int	Rtg	Att	Yds	Avg	TD
2022	Northwestern	1	0	—	4	8	50.0	68	8.5	0	1	96.4	6	–3	–0.5	0
2023	Northwestern	10	0	—	2	3	66.7	10	3.3	0	0	94.7	19	80	4.2	1
2024	Northwestern	10	10	3–7	159	296	53.7	1,714	5.8	7	8	104.8	87	213	2.4	2
Career		21	10	3–7	165	307	53.7	1,792	5.8	7	9	104.4	112	290	2.6	3

=== College baseball ===
Season	Team	G	PA	AB	R	H	2B	3B	HR	RBI	SB	CS	BB	SO	BA
2025	Northwestern	44	177	149	30	40	9	0	6	28	5	2	14	56	.268
2026	Northwestern	52	234	202	52	63	13	4	16	41	8	2	25	65	.312
Career		96	411	351	82	103	22	4	22	69	13	4	39	121	.293

== Personal life ==
His father John played linebacker at Harvard. He is a former American attorney who served as the United States attorney for the Northern District of Illinois from 2017 to 2023. Previously, he served as an Assistant United States Attorney in the Northern District of Illinois from 1999 to 2010. His mother Mary played volleyball at both Wright State and Loyola.
