= Kalel Mullings =

American football player (born 2002)

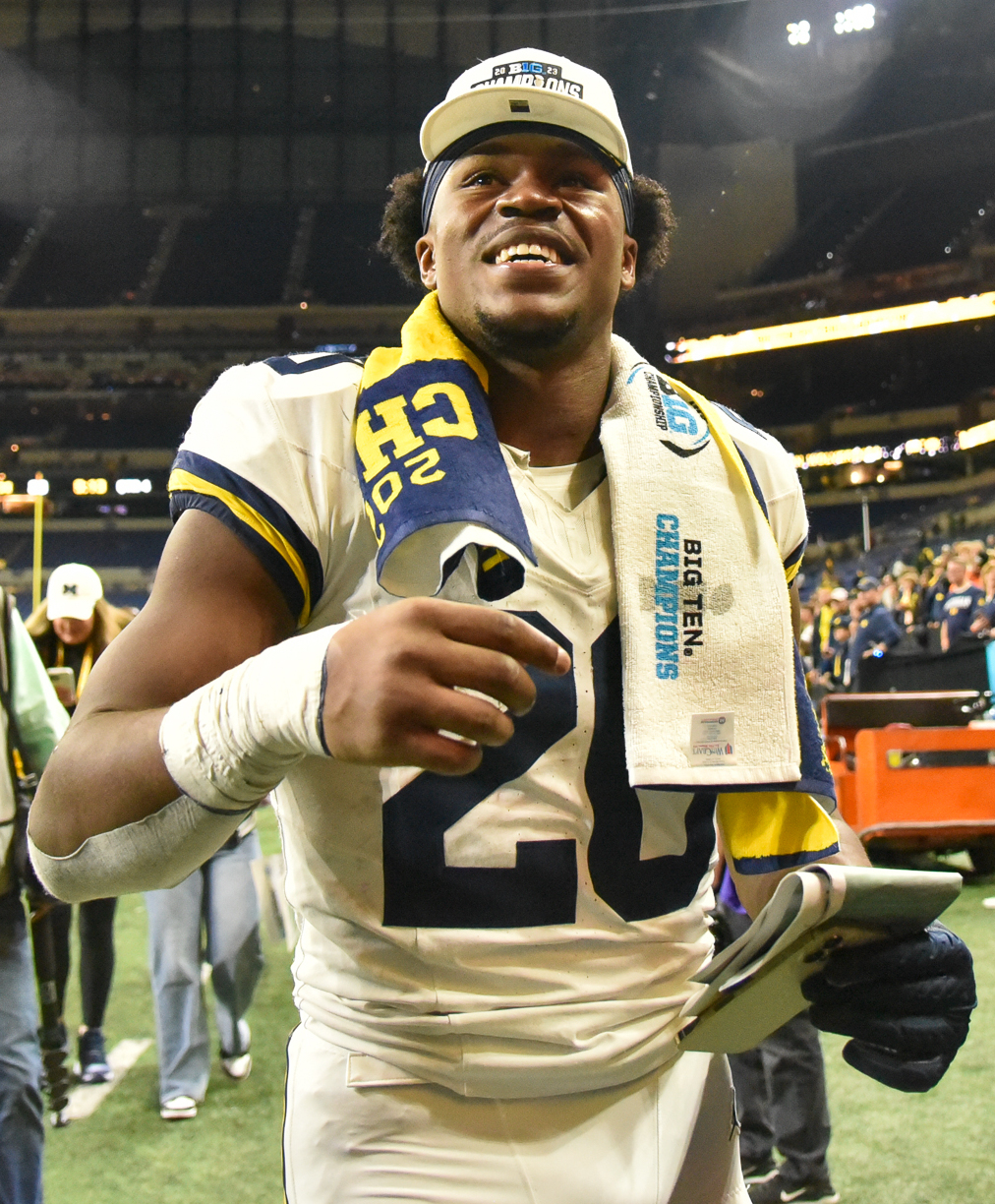
- Mullings with Michigan following the 2023 Big Ten Championship

No. 31 – Tennessee Titans
- Position: Running back
- Roster status: Active

Personal information
- Born: October 4, 2002 (age 24); Boston, Massachusetts, U.S.
- Listed height: 6 ft 2 in (1.88 m)
- Listed weight: 226 lb (103 kg)

Career information
- High school: Milton Academy (Milton, Massachusetts)
- College: Michigan (2020–2024)
- NFL draft: 2025: 6th round, 188th overall pick

Career history
- Tennessee Titans (2025–present)

Awards and highlights
- CFP national champion (2023); Third-team All-Big Ten (2024)

Career NFL statistics as of 2026
- Rushing yards: 10
- Rushing average: 2.5
- Stats at Pro Football Reference

Kalel Mullings (born October 4, 2002) is an American professional football running back for the Tennessee Titans of the National Football League (NFL). He played college football for the Michigan Wolverines, winning three consecutive Big Ten Conference titles and a national championship in 2023. Mullings was selected by the Titans in the sixth round of the 2025 NFL draft.

== Early life ==
Mullings was born on October 4, 2002 in Boston, Massachusetts, the son of Calicia and Dale Mullings. He grew up in West Roxbury, Massachusetts and attended Milton Academy. As a junior, Mullings rushed for 371 yards and 22 touchdowns, while adding 289 receiving yards and four touchdowns. As a senior, he rushed for 509 yards and 12 touchdowns, had 33 receptions for 358 yards and five touchdowns, and returned a punt for a touchdown. On defense, Mullings made 51 tackles, four sacks and had three interceptions. He was named the 2019 Massachusetts Gatorade Player of the Year. Mullings was a four-star recruit and ranked as the No. 92 overall player in the country in 2020. He committed to play college football at Michigan over schools such as Clemson, Notre Dame, Ohio State and Stanford.

== College career ==
=== Freshman and sophomore seasons (2020–2021) ===
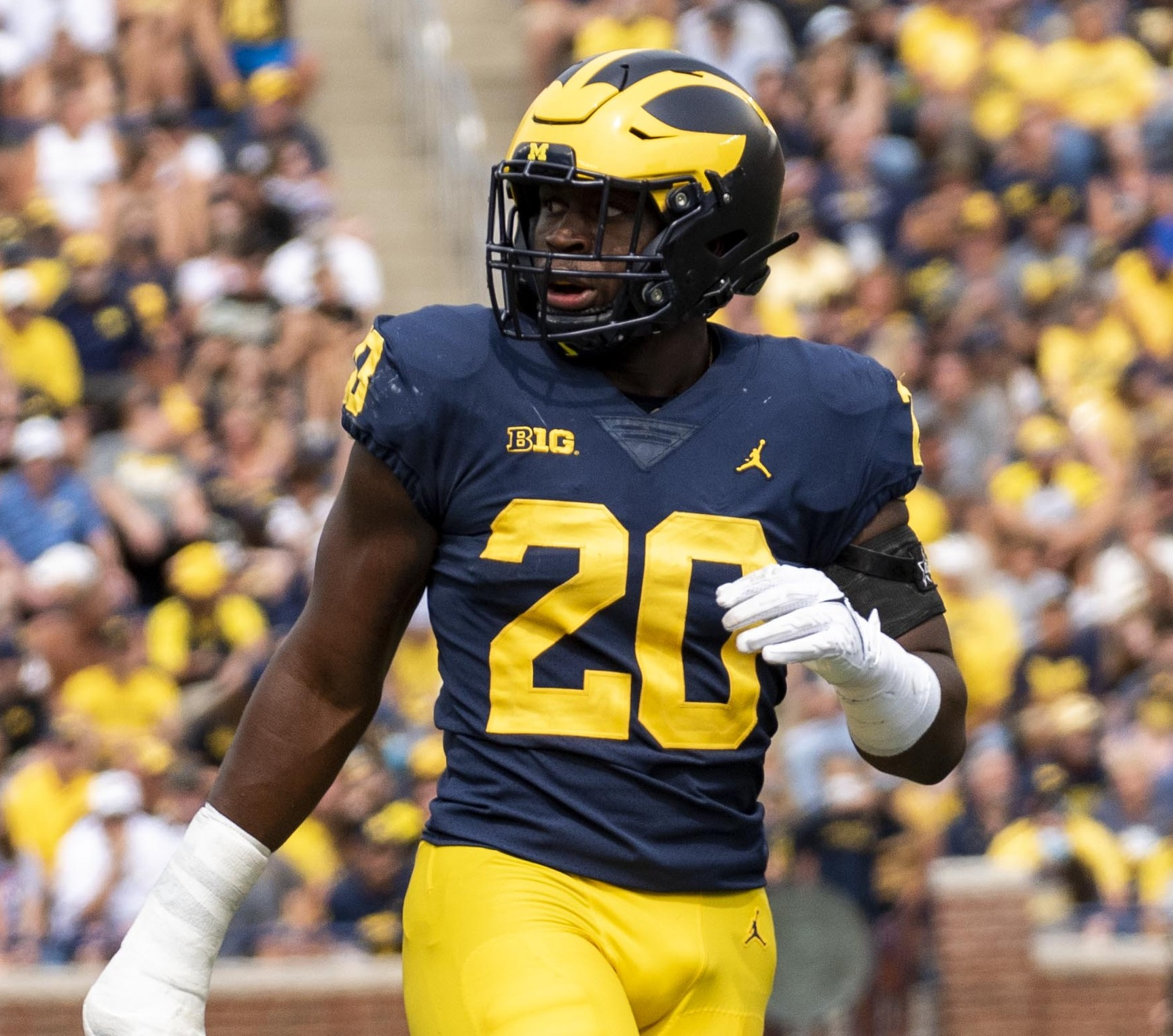
Mullings with Michigan in 2021

Mullings enrolled at the University of Michigan in 2020, playing in all six games on special teams and recording one tackle. In 2021, he appeared in 13 games on special teams and linebacker, registering 11 tackles.

=== Junior season (2022) ===
In 2022, Mullings switched from linebacker to running back midseason, largely due to injuries to Blake Corum and Donovan Edwards. Mullings saw immediate action, helping fill the void. In Michigan's season finale versus rival Ohio State, Mullings converted a big third down pass for 15 yards to Luke Schoonmaker, and help the Wolverines extend their drive and take a two score lead to beat the Buckeyes.

In the Big Ten Championship Game, Mullings rushed for his first two career touchdowns, helping Michigan win the Big Ten as they beat Purdue. In the Fiesta Bowl, Mullings would rush for a 1-yard touchdown, but he would also have a costly fumble at the goal line recovered by TCU. Mullings finished the 2022 season with 14 carries for 31 yards and three touchdowns, also making 12 tackles.

=== Senior season(s) (2023–2024) ===
In 2023, Mullings’ first full season as a running back, he earned the third most carries on Michigan's national championship team. He finished the season with 36 carries for 222 yards and a touchdown. He also caught two passes for 32 yards, including a key 19 yard reception along the sideline in the 2024 Rose Bowl victory versus Alabama.

In 2024, Mullings returned for a fifth season and was voted as an alternate team captain. In his first game of the season versus Fresno State, Mullings was Michigan’s leading rusher with a career high 15 carries for 92 yards. In week three versus Arkansas State, Mullings surpassed his career high again, rushing 15 times for 153 yards and two touchdowns. Mullings continued to play a large role in week four against USC, where he once again tallied a new career high, rushing 17 times for 159 yards and two touchdowns; including a 63-yard rush and the game-winning, last-minute touchdown run on the final drive. In week 5 against Minnesota, Mullings rushed for his third straight 100 yard game with two touchdowns, carrying the ball 24 times for 111 yards. In doing so, Mullings was awarded the Big Ten co-offensive player of the week.

In week 8 against Illinois, Mullings had 19 rushes for 87 yards and a touchdown. In week 13 versus Northwestern, Mullings rushed 12 times for 92 yards and a career-high three touchdown runs. In the last week of the season against Ohio State, Mullings carried the ball 32 times for 116 yards and a touchdown, leading Michigan to a 13–10 win over their arch-rival. He finished his career 4–0 against the Ohio State Buckeyes.

Mullings finished the 2024 season as the Wolverines leading rusher, carrying the ball 185 times for 948 yards with 12 touchdowns, and was named a third-team All-Big Ten selection. In December 2024, Mullings formally declared for the 2025 NFL draft and opted out of his final bowl game. In his five years at the University of Michigan, he won 49 games, three Big Ten championships and was a national champion. In total, Mullings appeared in 55 games on offense, defense and special teams, earning three career starts (two at running back and one at linebacker). He rushed for over 1,200 yards and scored 16 touchdowns.

== Professional career ==
Pre-draft measurables
Height	Weight	Arm length	Hand span	Wingspan
6 ft 1 1/2 in (1.87 m)	226 lb (103 kg)	31 3/4 in (0.81 m)	10 in (0.25 m)	6 ft 6 in (1.98 m)
All values from NFL Combine

Mullings was selected by the Tennessee Titans with the 188th overall pick in the sixth round of the 2025 NFL draft. After playing through an ankle injury in Week 3 against the Indianapolis Colts, Mullings was placed on injured reserve on September 26, 2025. He was activated on November 22, ahead of the team's Week 12 matchup against the Seattle Seahawks.

Mullings was waived by the Titans as a part of final roster cuts on August 30, 2026, but re–signed with the team's practice squad the next day. He was activated on October 24.
