= Ryan Hilinski =

American football player (born 2000)

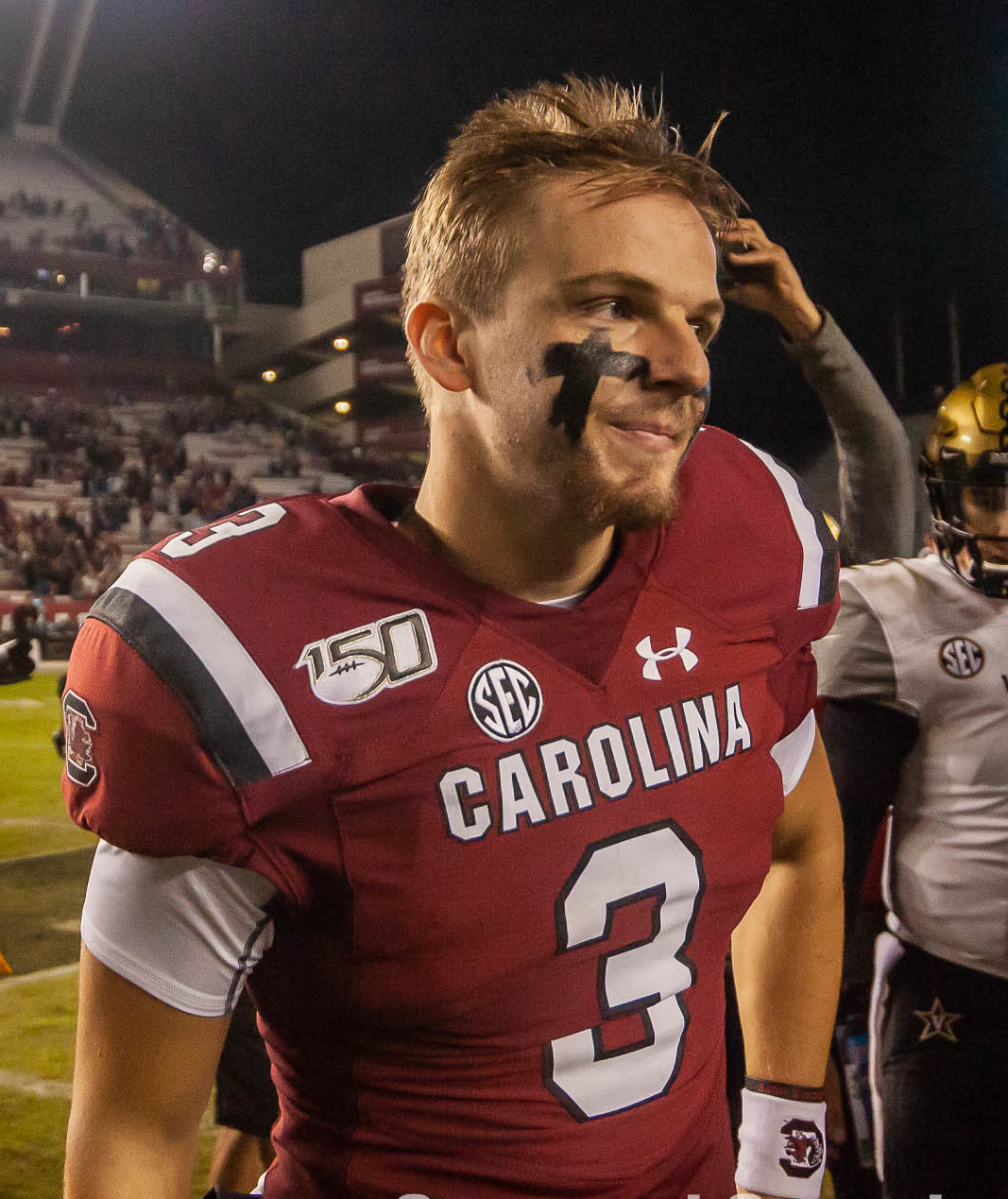
- Hilinski with South Carolina in 2019

No. 3
- Position: Quarterback

Personal information
- Born: October 24, 2000 (age 26); Orange, California, U.S.
- Listed height: 6 ft 3 in (1.91 m)
- Listed weight: 225 lb (102 kg)

Career information
- High school: Orange Lutheran (CA)
- College: South Carolina (2019–2020); Northwestern (2021–2024)
- Stats at ESPN

Ryan J. Hilinski (born October 24, 2000) is an American former college football quarterback who played for the South Carolina Gamecocks and Northwestern Wildcats.

== Early life ==
Hilinski attended the Lutheran High School of Orange County (commonly known as Orange Lutheran High School). As a senior, he played in 11 games and threw for 2,771 yards and 29 touchdowns. While in high school, he participated in the 2018 All-American Bowl.

Hilinski committed to South Carolina after receiving offers from 30 teams, including Stanford, USC, LSU, and Ohio State.

College recruiting
Name	Hometown	School	Height	Weight	Commit date
Ryan Hilinski; QB	Orange, CA	Orange Lutheran	6 ft 4 in (1.93 m)	222 lb (101 kg)	Apr 4, 2018
Ryan Hilinski; QB	Recruit ratings: Scout: Rivals: 247Sports: ESPN: (84)				
Overall recruit ranking: Scout: 2 (pro-style QB) Rivals: 3 (pro-style QB) 247Sports: 2 (pro-style QB) ESPN: 4 (Pocket Passer)
Note: In many cases, Scout, Rivals, 247Sports, On3, and ESPN may conflict in their listings of height and weight.; In these cases, the average was taken. ESPN grades are on a 100-point scale.; Sources: "South Carolina Football Commitments". Rivals.; "2019 South Carolina Football Commits". Scout.; "ESPN". ESPN.; "Scout.com Team Recruiting Rankings". Scout.; "2019 Team Ranking". Rivals.com.

== College career ==
=== South Carolina ===
==== 2019 ====
Hilinski was named backup quarterback prior to the start of the 2019 season. His first game appearance came during the 2019 Belk Kickoff Game against North Carolina after then starting quarterback Jake Bentley was injured in the game. Hilinski was named starting quarterback later that day. He made his first starting appearance in the second game of the season, a 72–10 win over Charleston Southern. With Hilinski starting, the Gamecocks would set a school record 775 yards of offense, as well as a school record 493 rushing yards. Next week, Hilinski would start in a home game against the Alabama Crimson Tide, a 47–23 loss, where he would complete more passes against Nick Saban's Crimson Tide than any other freshman quarterback.

Hilinski started 11 games his freshman year, completing 58.1 percent of his passes. He finished with 11 touchdowns and 5 interceptions.

==== 2020 ====
In September 2020, Hilinski was named the backup quarterback behind Collin Hill. He has appeared in 2 games. On December 30, 2020, Hilinski entered the transfer portal.

=== Northwestern ===
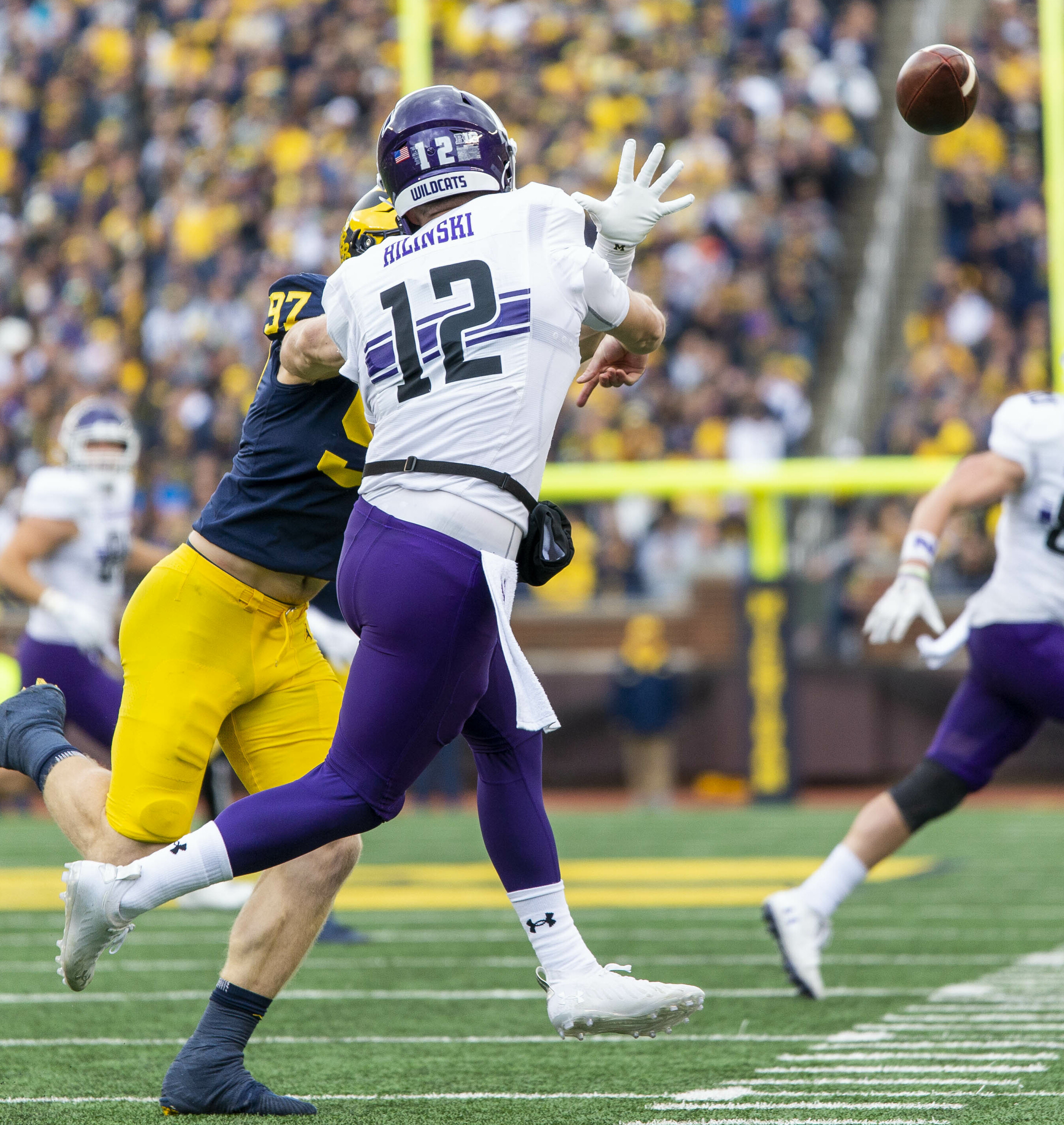
Hilinski with Northwestern in 2021

On January 19, 2021, Hilinski announced that he had transferred to Northwestern.

=== Statistics ===
Year	Team	Games			Passing								Rushing			
Year	Team	GP	GS	Record	Comp	Att	Pct	Yards	Avg	TD	Int	Rate	Att	Yards	Avg	TD
2019	South Carolina	11	11	4–7	236	406	58.1	2,357	5.8	11	5	113.4	33	−55	−1.7	1
2020	South Carolina	2	0	—	4	6	66.7	34	5.7	0	0	114.3	2	0	0.0	0
2021	Northwestern	9	5	2–3	95	176	54.0	978	5.6	3	4	101.7	23	−67	−2.9	1
2022	Northwestern	8	6	1–5	144	258	55.8	1,644	6.4	6	7	111.6	20	−4	−0.2	2
2023	Northwestern	3	0	—	2	4	50.0	88	22.0	1	0	317.3	1	2	2.0	0
2024	Northwestern	3	0	—	7	12	58.3	110	9.2	0	1	118.7	1	−4	−4.0	0
Career		36	22	7–15	488	862	56.6	5,211	6.0	21	17	111.5	80	−128	−1.6	4

== Professional career ==
Pre-draft measurables
Height	Weight
6 ft 3 1/4 in (1.91 m)	225 lb (102 kg)
Values from Pro Day

== Personal life ==
Hilinski was born to Mark and Kym Hilinski as the youngest of three children in the family. Ryan's oldest brother, Kelly, played as a quarterback for Notre Dame High School, Columbia University, Riverside City College and Weber State University. His second older brother, Tyler, who was also a quarterback at Washington State, died by suicide following his junior season.
