= Rod Heard II =

American football safety (born 2001)

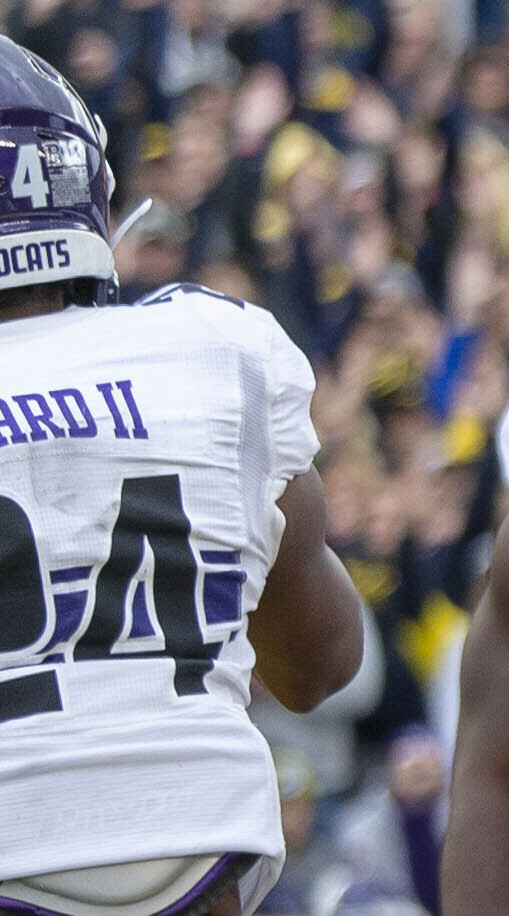
- Heard with Northwestern in 2021

Profile
- Position: Safety

Personal information
- Born: April 21, 2001 (age 25)
- Listed height: 5 ft 10 in (1.78 m)
- Listed weight: 183 lb (83 kg)

Career information
- High school: Harrison (Farmington Hills, Michigan)
- College: Northwestern (2019–2023); Notre Dame (2024)

Roderick Michael Heard II (born April 21, 2001) is an American former college football safety. He played for the Northwestern Wildcats and Notre Dame Fighting Irish.

== Early life ==
Heard attended Harrison High School in Farmington Hills, Michigan, and was in the last class to graduate before the school closed in 2019. He committed to play college football for the Northwestern Wildcats.

== College career ==
After five seasons at Northwestern, Heard transferred to Notre Dame.

=== College statistics ===
Year	Team	Games		Tackles				Interceptions				Fumbles		
Year	Team	GP	GS	Total	Solo	Ast	Sack	PD	Int	Yds	TD	FF	FR	TD
2019	Northwestern	1	0	1	0	1	0.0	0	0	0	0	0	0	0
2020	Northwestern	9	2	10	7	3	0.0	1	0	0	0	0	0	0
2021	Northwestern	12	4	31	24	7	0.0	1	0	0	0	2	1	0
2022	Northwestern	12	12	67	47	20	1.0	2	1	0	0	1	0	0
2023	Northwestern	13	13	85	54	31	1.0	4	1	10	0	2	1	0
2024	Notre Dame	16	0	37	25	12	1.0	4	0	0	0	1	1	0
Career		63	31	231	157	74	3.0	12	2	10	0	6	3	0

Pre-draft measurables
Height	Weight	Arm length	Hand span	40-yard dash	10-yard split	20-yard split	20-yard shuttle	Three-cone drill	Vertical jump	Broad jump	Bench press
5 ft 10 3/8 in (1.79 m)	183 lb (83 kg)	30 5/8 in (0.78 m)	8 1/2 in (0.22 m)	4.64 s	1.68 s	2.74 s	4.46 s	6.93 s	33.5 in (0.85 m)	9 ft 11 in (3.02 m)	12 reps
All values from Pro Day

== Personal life ==
Heard's father Roderick played football at Eastern Illinois.
