= Marshall Lang (American football) =

American football player (born 2001)

Profile
- Position: Tight end

Personal information
- Born: October 15, 2001 (age 25); Cincinnati, Ohio, U.S.
- Listed height: 6 ft 4 in (1.93 m)
- Listed weight: 249 lb (113 kg)

Career information
- High school: St. Xavier (Cincinnati)
- College: Northwestern (2020–2024)
- NFL draft: 2025: undrafted

Career history
- Seattle Seahawks (2025)*; New England Patriots (2025)*; Seattle Seahawks (2025)*; New England Patriots (2025)*; Minnesota Vikings (2026)*
- * Offseason or practice squad member only
- Stats at Pro Football Reference

Marshall Lang (born October 15, 2001) is an American professional football tight end. He played college football for the Northwestern Wildcats. Lang has also been a member of the Seattle Seahawks.

== Early life ==
Lang was born in Cincinnati, Ohio, and attended nearby St. Xavier High School.

== College career ==
Lang played college football for the Northwestern Wildcats from 2020 to 2024.

=== College statistics ===
Year	Team	Games		Receiving				Rushing			
Year	Team	GP	GS	Rec	Yds	Avg	TD	Att	Yds	Avg	TD
2020	Northwestern	4	0	0	0	—	0	0	0	—	0
2021	Northwestern	12	6	11	68	6.2	3	0	0	—	0
2022	Northwestern	12	6	15	192	12.8	0	0	0	—	0
2023	Northwestern	11	5	11	116	10.5	0	0	0	—	0
2024	Northwestern	12	3	11	115	10.5	1	1	3	3.0	0
Career		51	20	48	491	10.2	4	1	3	3.0	0

== Professional career ==
Pre-draft measurables
Height	Weight	Arm length	Hand span	Wingspan	40-yard dash	10-yard split	20-yard split	20-yard shuttle	Three-cone drill	Vertical jump	Broad jump	Bench press
6 ft 4 1/8 in (1.93 m)	249 lb (113 kg)	32 3/4 in (0.83 m)	9 3/4 in (0.25 m)	6 ft 4 3/4 in (1.95 m)	4.86 s	1.67 s	2.83 s	4.25 s	7.18 s	31.5 in (0.80 m)	9 ft 11 in (3.02 m)	18 reps
All values from Pro Day

=== Seattle Seahawks (first stint) ===
After not being selected in the 2025 NFL draft, Lang signed with the Seattle Seahawks as an undrafted free agent. He was released on August 26, 2025, as part of final roster cut downs.

=== New England Patriots (first stint) ===
On October 14, 2025, the New England Patriots signed Lang to the practice squad. He was released by the team on October 16.

=== Seattle Seahawks (second stint) ===
On November 6, 2025, the Seattle Seahawks re-signed Lang to their practice squad. On November 18, he was released from the team.

=== New England Patriots (second stint) ===
On December 30, 2025, the New England Patriots re-signed Lang to the team's practice squad. On February 11, 2026, he signed a reserve/futures contract with New England.

On April 27, 2026, Lang was released by the Patriots.

=== Minnesota Vikings ===
On June 16, 2026, Lang signed with the Minnesota Vikings. On August 30, he was waived by the Vikings as a part of the final roster cuts. Lang was re–signed to the Vikings' practice squad the next day and released once again the next day after that.
