= Mike Wright (quarterback) =

American football player (born 2001)

Mike Wright Jr.
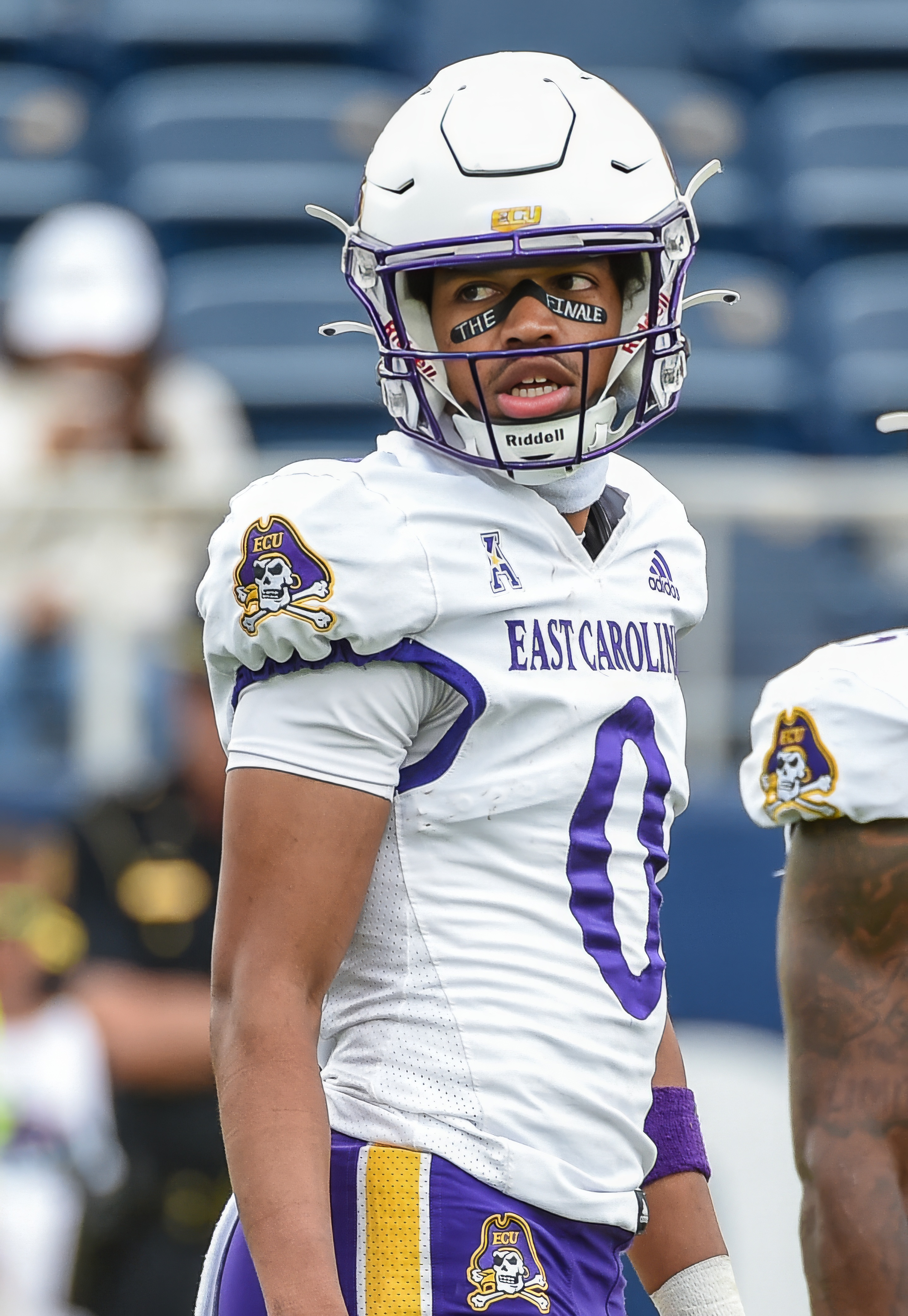
- Wright Jr. in 2025

No. 0 – East Carolina Pirates
- Position: Quarterback
- Class: Graduate Student

Personal information
- Born: September 28, 2001 (age 25)
- Listed height: 6 ft 4 in (1.93 m)
- Listed weight: 198 lb (90 kg)

Career information
- High school: Woodward Academy (College Park, Georgia)
- College: Vanderbilt (2020–2022); Mississippi State (2023); Northwestern (2024); East Carolina (2025)
- Stats at ESPN

Michael Wright Jr. (born September 28, 2001) is an American college football quarterback for the East Carolina Pirates. Wright previously played for the Vanderbilt Commodores, Mississippi State Bulldogs, and Northwestern Wildcats.

== Early life ==
Wright attended Woodward Academy in College Park, Georgia. As a senior, Wright recorded 2,653 passing yards, 716 rushing yards, and 50 total touchdowns, and was named region 4-AAAA player of the year. A three-star recruit, he originally committed to UCF before flipping his commitment to play college football at Vanderbilt University.

== College career ==
=== Vanderbilt ===
Wright played sparingly as a freshman in 2020, before being named Vanderbilt's backup, behind Ken Seals, entering the 2021 season. After an injury to Seals, Wright made his first career start against South Carolina, throwing for 206 yards and a touchdown in a 21–20 defeat. He finished the season passing for 1,042 yards, eight touchdowns, and six interceptions, while also rushing for 373 yards and a touchdown. Entering the 2022 season, Wright was named the week one starter. In the first game of the season against Hawaii, he contributed four total touchdowns, while passing for 146 yards and adding another 163 yards rushing, in a 63–10 victory. The following week against Elon, Wright set a school record for total touchdowns in a game with six total, four passing and two rushing. However, after a poor showing by Wright against Wake Forest, he would be benched in favor of freshman AJ Swann. Against Kentucky, he threw for 184 yards and a touchdown while also rushing for 126 yards and a touchdown, leading Vanderbilt to a 24–21 win and being named SEC Offensive Player of the Week. Wright continued to split time with Swann throughout the season, before announcing at the seasons end that he would enter the transfer portal.

=== Mississippi State ===
On January 22, 2023, Wright announced that he would be transferring to Mississippi State University to play for the Mississippi State Bulldogs. Entering the season, Wright was named the backup to Will Rogers. Wright received his first amount of significant playing time with Mississippi State after an injury to Rogers against Western Michigan. He threw for 57 yards and ran for 24 yards and a touchdown in the 41–28 win. Following a bye week, Wright made his first start with Mississippi State, combining for 145 yards and a touchdown in a 7–3 triumph over Arkansas. He finished the season throwing for 453 yards and three touchdowns, in addition to rushing for 324 yards and three touchdowns, before entering the transfer portal for a second time.

=== Northwestern ===
On May 9, 2024, Wright announced that he would be transferring to Northwestern University to play for the Northwestern Wildcats.

=== East Carolina ===
In May 2025, Wright announced his decision to transfer to East Carolina University to play for the East Carolina Pirates.

=== Statistics ===
Season	Team	Games			Passing								Rushing			
Season	Team	GP	GS	Record	Cmp	Att	Pct	Yds	Y/A	TD	Int	Rtg	Att	Yds	Avg	TD
2020	Vanderbilt	6	0	—	6	10	60.0	51	5.1	1	1	115.8	14	15	1.1	1
2021	Vanderbilt	10	5	0−5	93	175	53.1	1,042	6.0	8	6	111.4	91	373	4.1	1
2022	Vanderbilt	10	6	4−2	85	148	57.4	974	6.6	12	4	134.1	71	571	7.3	5
2023	Mississippi State	12	3	1−2	48	85	56.5	453	5.3	3	3	105.8	71	324	4.6	3
2024	Northwestern	3	2	1−1	38	66	57.6	354	5.4	0	1	99.6	18	84	4.7	1
2025	East Carolina	12	0	—	3	7	42.9	13	1.9	0	0	58.5	20	72	3.6	2
Career		53	16	6−10	273	491	55.6	2,887	5.9	24	15	115.0	285	1,385	4.9	13
