= Anto Saka =

American football player (born 2004)

No. 14 – Texas A&M Aggies
- Position: Defensive end
- Class: Redshirt Senior

Personal information
- Born: April 12, 2004 (age 22)
- Listed height: 6 ft 4 in (1.93 m)
- Listed weight: 255 lb (116 kg)

Career information
- High school: Loyola Blakefield (Towson, Maryland)
- College: Northwestern (2022–2025); Texas A&M (2026–present)
- Stats at ESPN

Anto Saka (born April 12, 2004) is an American college football defensive end for the Texas A&M Aggies. He previously played for the Northwestern Wildcats.

== Early life ==
Saka attended Loyola Blakefield in Towson, Maryland. He was rated as a four star recruit, the fourth overall player in Maryland and the 202nd overall player in the class of 2022. Saka committed to play college football for the Northwestern Wildcats over offers from other schools such as Michigan, Michigan State, Penn State, Tennessee, Toledo, USC, and Wake Forest.

== College career ==
=== Northwestern ===
As a freshman in 2022, Saka was redshirted. In week 2 of the 2023 season, he notched his first career sack in a victory versus UTEP. In week 3 Saka tallied another sack against Duke. He finished the season with 13 tackles, five and a half sacks, and a forced fumble in 11 games played. In 2024, Saka posted 15 tackles with five being for a loss, and three and a half sacks in 11 games.

On January 4, 2026, Saka announced that he would enter the NCAA transfer portal.

=== Texas A&M ===
On January 7, 2026, Saka announced that he would transfer to Texas A&M.
