= Mike Bajakian =

American football coach (born 1974)

Cleveland Browns
- Title: Quarterbacks coach

Personal information
- Born: August 4, 1974 (age 52); River Vale, New Jersey, U.S.

Career information
- Position: Quarterback
- High school: Bergen Catholic (NJ)
- College: Williams (1992–1995)

Career history
- Delbarton School (NJ) (1996–1997) Quarterbacks coach & passing game coordinator; Rutgers (1998–1999) Graduate assistant; Sacred Heart (2000) Quarterbacks coach; Michigan (2000–2001) Graduate assistant; Central Michigan (2002–2003) Quarterbacks coach; Chicago Bears (2004–2006) Offensive quality control coach; Central Michigan (2007–2009) Offensive coordinator & quarterbacks coach; Cincinnati (2010–2012) Offensive coordinator & quarterbacks coach; Tennessee (2013–2014) Offensive coordinator & quarterbacks coach; Tampa Bay Buccaneers (2015–2018) Quarterbacks coach; Boston College (2019) Offensive coordinator & quarterbacks coach; Northwestern (2020–2023) Offensive coordinator & quarterbacks coach; Utah (2024) Offensive analyst; Utah (2024) Interim offensive coordinator & quarterbacks coach; UMass (2025) Offensive coordinator & quarterbacks coach; Cleveland Browns (2026–present) Quarterbacks coach

Awards and highlights
- First-team All-NESCAC (1995)

Mike Bajakian (born August 4, 1974) is an American football coach who is the quarterbacks coach for the Cleveland Browns of the National Football League (NFL). He previously served as the quarterbacks coach for the Tampa Bay Buccaneers of the National Football League (NFL) and as the offensive coordinator at Boston College, Tennessee, Cincinnati, Central Michigan, Northwestern, Utah, and UMass.

== Coaching career ==
On February 1, 2026, the Cleveland Browns hired Bajakian to serve as the team's quarterbacks coach under new head coach Todd Monken.

== Personal life ==
Bajakian grew up in River Vale, New Jersey and graduated from Bergen Catholic High School with the class of 1992.

He is married to Michelene, and together they have five children: Mary, Anna, Emma, Samuel and Rose.

Bajakian is of Armenian descent.
