= Kurt Anderson (American football) =

American football coach and player (born 1978)

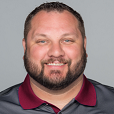

Current position
- Title: Offensive line coach
- Team: Boston College
- Conference: Atlantic Coast Conference

Biographical details
- Born: August 8, 1978 (age 48); Evanston, Illinois, U.S.

Playing career
- 1997–2001: Michigan
- 2002: Arizona Cardinals
- Position: Center

Coaching career (HC unless noted)
- 2005: Indiana State (OT/TE)
- 2008: Eastern Michigan (TE)
- 2009–2012: Eastern Michigan (OL)
- 2013–2015: Buffalo Bills (OL/asst. OL)
- 2016–2017: Arkansas (OL)
- 2018–2024: Northwestern (OL)
- 2025: UMass (OL)
- 2025-present: Boston College (OL)

Accomplishments and honors

Championships
- National (1997)

Kurt Kristoffer Anderson (born August 8, 1978) is an American football coach and former player who is currently an offensive line coach for Boston College. Prior to coaching at Boston College, Anderson was an offensive line coach at UMass in 2025 and offensive line coach with the Northwestern Wildcats from 2018 to 2024, where he coached two first round draft picks in Rashawn Slater, number thirteen overall in 2021 to the Los Angeles Chargers and Peter Skoronski number eleven overall in 2023 to the Tennessee Titans. Anderson played college football at the University of Michigan.

Anderson is also the former offensive line coach at the University of Arkansas where he coached Frank Ragnow, the number twenty overall pick in 2018 to the Detroit Lions. He served as the assistant offensive line coach for the Buffalo Bills in the National Football League (NFL). In the 2015 season, Anderson took over head offensive line coaching duties for training camp and the first six weeks of the regular season for the suspended Aaron Kromer.

== High school ==
Anderson attended Glenbrook South High School in Glenview, Illinois. He was a 1996 Parade All-American linebacker. He earned a full scholarship to University of Michigan.

== College career ==
Anderson was a two-year letterman on the offensive line (2000–2001) for the Wolverines and was the starting center. He received the Hugh R. Rader Jr. Memorial Award as the team's top offensive lineman and was selected All-Big Ten Conference by the conference coaches following the 2001 season. He was a member of the 1997 Michigan Wolverines football team that won the 1998 Rose Bowl, as well as a share of the 1997 national championship. He also played in the 1999 Citrus Bowl, the 2000 Orange Bowl, the 2001 Florida Citrus Bowl, and the 2002 Florida Citrus Bowls. He signed as an undrafted free agent with the Arizona Cardinals of the National Football League in 2002.

== Coaching career ==
In 2005, Anderson was an assistant coach at Indiana State where he worked with the offensive tackles and tight ends. In 2006, Anderson was a defensive quality control coach at The University of Michigan. Anderson spent the 2007 season as a graduate assistant coach for the offensive line. Anderson joined the Eastern Michigan staff on April 2, 2008 as tight ends coach before shifting to the offensive line and run game coordinator in 2009. In 2010, Eastern Michigan finished with 2,080 yards rushing. The Eagles' ground attack was extremely effective during the 2011 campaign, Eastern Michigan rushed for 2,620 yards and 16 touchdowns on 575 carries for the 14th-best ground attack in the nation. A record two-year combined total of 4,700 yards for Eastern Michigan.

On January 28, 2013, Anderson joined the Buffalo Bills staff as an offensive quality control coach. On January 26, 2015, it was announced that Anderson was retained and promoted to assistant offensive line coach, by newly named head coach Rex Ryan. In 2015, Anderson coached the Buffalo Bills offensive line that paved the way to 2,432 yards rushing, 152 yards rushing per game, 4.8 yards per attempt, and 19 rushing touchdowns; all marks were best in the NFL on the season. On January 9, 2016, Anderson was introduced as the offensive line coach at the University of Arkansas by head coach Bret Bielema. Anderson developed Frank Ragnow, All-American and 20th Overall draft pick in the 2017 NFL draft. Ragnow is the highest paid center in the NFL. Others NFL lineman developed at Arkansas, are Hjalte Froholdt and Dan Skipper.

In 2018, Anderson joined the Northwestern University Wildcats as a quality control assistant and was hired as the offensive line coach the following season. He helped lead the Wildcats to Big Ten West Championships in 2018 and 2020. He developed current Los Angeles Chargers Offensive Tackle Rashawn Slater, the 13th overall draft pick in 2020. Slater was a Pro Bowl performer as well as All- Pro in his rookie season. He also coached Peter Skoronski, who went to the Tennessee Titans with the 11th overall pick in the 2023 draft. Anderson coached the first five years of his career under head coach Pat Fitzgerald, who was fired in July 2023 in the wake of a hazing scandal within the program. Anderson coached the 2023 season under new head coach David Braun but was fired shortly after the end of the season.

Anderson coached at UMass as an offensive line coach during the 2025 season. On December 18, 2025 it was announced Anderson was leaving UMass to become an offensive line coach at Boston College.

== Family ==
Anderson is married with five children, wife Jennifer and sons Hawken and Torin, daughter Dagny and twins Odin and Raina. His grandfather, Bob Nowaskey, played for the Chicago Bears of the NFL and the Baltimore Colts and Los Angeles Dons of the All-America Football Conference (AAFC). His father, Donald Anderson, played college football at Northwestern University and in the NFL with the New Orleans Saints. Kurt's older brother, Erick Anderson, is a fellow Michigan alumnus who won the Butkus Award in 1991 playing linebacker for the Wolverines and played in the NFL with the Kansas City Chiefs and the Washington Football Team. Another older brother, Lars, played football at Indiana University Bloomington. His nephew, Trystan Anderson, Plays football at Drake University.
