= Jim O'Neil (American football) =

American football coach (born 1978)

Detroit Lions
- Title: Assistant head coach/safeties

Personal information
- Born: August 26, 1978 (age 48); Philadelphia, Pennsylvania, U.S.

Career information
- College: Towson

Career history
- Albany (2001) Assistant offensive line & tight ends coach; Pennsylvania (2002) Assistant offensive line coach; Northwestern (2003–2004) Graduate assistant; Towson (2005) Defensive coordinator & defensive backs coach; Eastern Michigan (2006–2008) Safeties coach; New York Jets (2009–2012); Defensive quality control coach (2009); Assistant defensive backs coach (2010-2012); Buffalo Bills (2013) Linebackers coach; Cleveland Browns (2014–2015) Defensive coordinator; San Francisco 49ers (2016) Defensive coordinator; Oakland Raiders (2018–2020); Senior defensive assistant (2018); Defensive backs coach (2019-2020); Northwestern (2021–2022) Defensive coordinator; Detroit Lions (2024-present); Defensive assistant (2024); Defensive assistant/safeties coach (2025); Assistant head coach/safeties coach (2026–present)
- Coaching profile at Pro Football Reference

Jim O'Neil (born October 26, 1978) is an American football coach who currently is the Assistant Head Coach / Safeties for the Detroit Lions. Previously he was the defensive coordinator at Northwestern University and as assistant coach in the NFL for the New York Jets, Buffalo Bills, Cleveland Browns, the San Francisco 49ers and Las Vegas Raiders. He was a coach for numerous college football teams before that.

== College career ==
From 2006 to 2008, he was at Eastern Michigan as the recruiting coordinator and safeties coach. He was the defensive coordinator at Towson in 2005, a graduate assistant/defensive back coach at Northwestern from 2003 to 2004, assistant offensive line coach at Pennsylvania in 2002 and an assistant offensive line/tight ends coach at SUNY Albany in 2001. O'Neil returned to Northwestern as the defensive coordinator for the 2021 and 2022 seasons.

== Professional career ==
=== New York Jets ===
O'Neil entered the NFL joining the New York Jets as a defensive quality control & defensive backs coach in 2009. He was moved to assistant defensive backs coach in 2010 and remained in that position through the 2012 season.

=== Buffalo Bills ===
O’Neil spent the 2013 season as the linebackers coach for the Buffalo Bills.

=== Cleveland Browns ===
After the 2013 season, O'Neil was hired as the defensive coordinator of the Cleveland Browns in 2014, but was relieved of his duties after the 2015 season due to a coaching overhaul after head coach Mike Pettine was fired.

=== San Francisco 49ers ===
O'Neil was hired by Chip Kelly on January 26, 2016, to become the defensive coordinator of the San Francisco 49ers.

=== Oakland/Las Vegas Raiders ===
In January 2018 the Raiders hired O'Neil to be their Senior defensive assistant. He was promoted to the Defensive backs coach for the 2019–2020 seasons.

=== Detroit Lions ===
O'Neil was hired by the Lions on February 21, 2024, to become the defensive assistant of the Detroit Lions.
