= Josh Thompson (offensive lineman) =

American football player (born 2002)

No. 67 – Atlanta Falcons
- Position: Guard
- Roster status: Practice squad

Personal information
- Born: October 9, 2002 (age 24); Fenton, Michigan, U.S.
- Listed height: 6 ft 5 in (1.96 m)
- Listed weight: 315 lb (143 kg)

Career information
- High school: Fenton (Fenton, Michigan)
- College: Northwestern (2021–2024); LSU (2025)
- NFL draft: 2026: undrafted

Career history
- Kansas City Chiefs (2026)*; Atlanta Falcons (2026–present)*
- * Offseason or practice squad member only
- Stats at Pro Football Reference

Josh Thompson (born October 9, 2002) is an American professional football guard for the Atlanta Falcons of the National Football League (NFL). He played college football for the Northwestern Wildcats and the LSU Tigers.

== Early life ==
Thompson was born on October 9, 2002, in Fenton, Michigan as one of eight children. He attended high school in Fenton where he played both offensive lineman and guard positions with the Fenton Tigers team. Becoming a standout in football, Thompson earned numerous regional, league, area and first team honors and served the Tigers as team captain. Prior to graduation, Thompson the three-star recruiting prospect, declared to play for Texas Tech.

== College career ==
=== Northwestern ===
Thompson committed to Northwestern University in 2020 and redshirted the 2021 season. During his redshirt season in 2022, Thompson joined the Wildcats for eight games. During his redshirt sophomore season in 2023, Thompson started 11 of 13 total games as right tackle. In this second season of active play, Thompson earned his first All-Big Ten accolade. During his redshirt junior season in 2024, Thompson earned his second All-Big Ten honor after starting 10 games at right guard. At the end of his time at Northwestern, 247Sports.com rated Thompson as a four-star prospect entering the transfer portal. He graduated with a bachelor's degree in education and social policy.

=== Louisiana State ===
Thompson successfully transferred to Louisiana State University to play his senior season of college football in 2025. He played starting right guard in all 12 games with the LSU Tigers.

== Professional career ==
Pre-draft measurables
Height	Weight	Arm length	Hand span	Wingspan	20-yard shuttle	Three-cone drill	Broad jump
6 ft 4 1/2 in (1.94 m)	304 lb (138 kg)	32 3/4 in (0.83 m)	9 1/2 in (0.24 m)	6 ft 8 1/8 in (2.04 m)	4.80 s	7.94 s	8 ft 8 in (2.64 m)
All values from Pro Day

=== Kansas City Chiefs ===
On May 11, 2026, Thompson signed a three-year contract with the Kansas City Chiefs as an undrafted free agent following the 2026 NFL draft. On August 30, he was waived as part of final roster cuts.

=== Atlanta Falcons ===
On September 1, 2026, Thompson signed with the Atlanta Falcons' practice squad.

== Personal life ==
Thompson's father Randall, played college football at Central Michigan and Thompson's brother Reid, played football for Wayne State.
