= Aidan Hubbard =

American football player (born 2003)

No. 93 – Seattle Seahawks
- Position: Outside linebacker
- Roster status: Practice squad

Personal information
- Born: March 15, 2003 (age 23); Cleveland, Ohio, U.S.
- Listed height: 6 ft 4 in (1.93 m)
- Listed weight: 259 lb (117 kg)

Career information
- High school: Saint Ignatius (Cleveland)
- College: Northwestern (2021–2025)
- NFL draft: 2026: undrafted

Career history
- Seattle Seahawks (2026–present)*
- * Offseason or practice squad member only
- Stats at Pro Football Reference

Aidan Hubbard (born March 15, 2003) is an American professional football outside linebacker for the Seattle Seahawks of the National Football League (NFL). He played college football for the Northwestern Wildcats and signed with the Seahawks as an undrafted free agent in 2026.

== Early life ==
Hubbard was born in Cleveland, Ohio and attended Saint Ignatius High School in Cleveland, Ohio.

== College career ==
Hubbard redshirted in 2021 and did not see game action that season.

In 2022, he appeared in 11 games and had 12 solo tackles, five assisted tackles, one tackle for loss, and one sack.

In 2023, he played in all 13 games with 18 solo tackles, nine assisted tackles, 8.5 tackles for loss, six sacks, and one pass deflection, including a three‑sack performance against Maryland, which was tied for the second-most in a game in the team's history.

In 2024, he started 12 games and had 12 solo tackles, 21 assisted tackles, seven tackles for loss, six sacks, one pass deflection, and one fumble recovery for a touchdown. He earned All‑Big Ten Honorable Mention that season.

As a senior in 2025, he started all 11 games and had 14 solo tackles, 14 assisted tackles, 10 tackles for loss, 7.5 sacks, and one forced fumble. He finished his collegiate career with 20.5 sacks, ranking fifth on Northwestern's all‑time sack leaderboard, and started 26 of his 47 career games.

Over his collegiate career, Hubbard had 56 solo tackles, 49 assisted tackles, 26.5 tackles for loss, two pass deflections, one fumble recovery, and one forced fumble in 47 games.

== Professional career ==
Pre-draft measurables
Height	Weight	Arm length	Hand span	Wingspan	40-yard dash	10-yard split	20-yard split	Vertical jump	Broad jump	Bench press
6 ft 4 1/2 in (1.94 m)	260 lb (118 kg)	32 in (0.81 m)	9 1/8 in (0.23 m)	6 ft 6 5/8 in (2.00 m)	4.80 s	1.67 s	2.76 s	38.5 in (0.98 m)	10 ft 0 in (3.05 m)	21 reps
All values from NFL Combine/Pro Day

On May 1, 2026, Hubbard signed a three-year, $3.12 million contract with the Seattle Seahawks as an undrafted free agent. He was waived by Seattle on August 30 as a part of final roster cuts, and re-signed a day later to the practice squad.
