= Carmine Bastone =

American gridiron football player (born 2003)

No. 79 – Edmonton Elks
- Position: Defensive lineman
- Roster status: Practice roster
- CFL status: American

Personal information
- Born: June 5, 2003 (age 23)
- Listed height: 6 ft 2 in (1.88 m)
- Listed weight: 300 lb (136 kg)

Career information
- High school: St. Charles North (St. Charles, Illinois)
- College: Northwestern (2021–2025)
- NFL draft: 2026: undrafted

Career history
- Edmonton Elks (2026–present)

Awards and highlights
- Grey Cup champion (2026)
- Stats at CFL.ca

Carmine Bastone (born June 5, 2003) is an American professional football defensive lineman for the Edmonton Elks of the Canadian Football League (CFL). He played college football for the Northwestern Wildcats.

== Early life ==
Bastone was born on June 5, 2003. He attended St. Charles North High School in St. Charles, Illinois, earning IHFSCA first team all-state honors.

== College career ==
Bastone played college football for the Northwestern Wildcats from 2021 to 2025. He joined the team in 2021 as a preferred walk-on. In 39 games, Bastone had 68 tackles, including nine for loss, six sacks, one pass deflection, two forced fumbles and one fumble recovery. In 2025, he was an All-Big Ten honorable mention.

== Professional career ==
Pre-draft measurables
Height	Weight	Arm length	Hand span	Wingspan	40-yard dash	10-yard split	20-yard split	20-yard shuttle	Three-cone drill	Vertical jump	Broad jump	Bench press
6 ft 1 in (1.85 m)	291 lb (132 kg)	31 5/8 in (0.80 m)	9 5/8 in (0.24 m)	6 ft 5 5/8 in (1.97 m)	4.91 s	1.72 s	2.84 s	4.45 s	7.25 s	30 1/2 in (0.77 m)	9 ft 2 in (2.79 m)	30 reps
All values from Pro day

On July 13, 2026, the Edmonton Elks of the Canadian Football League (CFL) signed Bastone to the practice roster. On August 13, he was elevated to the active roster and made his debut on August 15, against the Toronto Argonauts.
