= Cam Porter =

American gridiron football player (born 2002)

- Porter with the Toronto Argonauts in 2026

No. 38 – Toronto Argonauts
- Position: Running back
- Roster status: Active
- CFL status: American

Personal information
- Born: April 13, 2002 (age 24)
- Listed height: 5 ft 11 in (1.80 m)
- Listed weight: 205 lb (93 kg)

Career information
- High school: La Salle (Cincinnati, Ohio)
- College: Northwestern (2020–2025)
- NFL draft: 2026: undrafted

Career history
- Toronto Argonauts (2026–present)
- Stats at CFL.ca

Cameron Porter (born April 13, 2002) is an American professional football running back for the Toronto Argonauts of the Canadian Football League (CFL). He played college football for the Northwestern Wildcats.

== Early life ==
Porter was born on April 13, 2002. He attended La Salle High School in Cincinnati, Ohio, where he had 2,285 rushing yards, 690 receiving yards and 34 touchdowns, earning second-team All-State honors by MaxPreps.

== College career ==
Porter played college football for the Northwestern Wildcats from 2020 to 2025. As a true freshman, he rushed for 333 yards and five touchdowns with nine receptions for 57 yards. Porter missed the entire 2021 season after suffering a lower-body injury in the preseason. In 2022, he had 286 rushing yards, two touchdowns and seven receptions for 50 yards. The following season, Porter had his best season from scrimmage with 651 yards and four touchdowns on the ground while adding 21 catches for 121 yards and a touchdown. In 2024, he rushed for 501 yards and six touchdowns with 23 receptions for 174 yards. In his final season, Porter played in two games, before suffering a season-ending right leg injury. Prior to his injury, he tallied 137 rushing yards, one touchdown and three receptions for 37 yards.

== Professional career ==
Pre-draft measurables
Height	Weight	Arm length	Hand span	Wingspan	40-yard dash	10-yard split	20-yard split	Bench press
5 ft 9 in (1.75 m)	214 lb (97 kg)	30 3/8 in (0.77 m)	9 1/8 in (0.23 m)	6 ft 2 1/2 in (1.89 m)	4.79 s	1.63 s	2.75 s	25 reps
All values from Pro day

After going unselected in the 2026 NFL draft, Porter signed with the Toronto Argonauts of the Canadian Football League (CFL) to the practice roster. On October 15, he was elevated to the active roster and made his CFL debut the following day. Against the winless Ottawa Redblacks, Porter rushed the ball seven times for 31 yards and a touchdown while adding a 15-yard reception.
