= 2024 New Mexico Lobos football team =

American college football season

2024 New Mexico Lobos football
- Conference: Mountain West Conference
- Record: 5–7 (3–4 MW)
- Head coach: Bronco Mendenhall (1st season)
- Offensive coordinator: Jason Beck (1st season)
- Offensive scheme: Power spread
- Defensive coordinator: Nick Howell (1st season)
- Base defense: 3–3–5
- Home stadium: University Stadium

2024 Mountain West Conference football standings
	Conf.			Overall
Team	W		L	W		L
No. 8 Boise State y$^	7	–	0	12	–	2
No. 23 UNLV y	6	–	1	11	–	3
Colorado State	6	–	1	8	–	5
Fresno State	4	–	3	6	–	7
San Jose State	3	–	4	7	–	6
Air Force	3	–	4	5	–	7
Hawaii	3	–	4	5	–	7
New Mexico	3	–	4	5	–	7
Utah State	3	–	4	4	–	8
San Diego State	2	–	5	3	–	9
Wyoming	2	–	5	3	–	9
Nevada	0	–	7	3	–	10
Championship: Boise State 21, UNLV 7
^ – College Football Playoff participant; $ – Conference champion; y – Championship game participant; Rankings from AP Poll

The 2024 New Mexico Lobos football team represented the University of New Mexico as a member of the Mountain West Conference (MW) during the 2024 NCAA Division I FBS football season. Led by Bronco Mendenhall in his first and only season as head coach, the Lobos compiled an overall record of 5–7 with a mark of 3–4 in conference play, placing in a five-way tie for fifth in the MW. The team played home games at University Stadium in Albuquerque, New Mexico.

Following the season, Mendenhall left the team to accept the head coaching position at Utah State University. On December 14, University of Idaho head coach Jason Eck was hired as the Lobos' new head coach; he led the Vandals to the FCS playoffs in all three seasons.

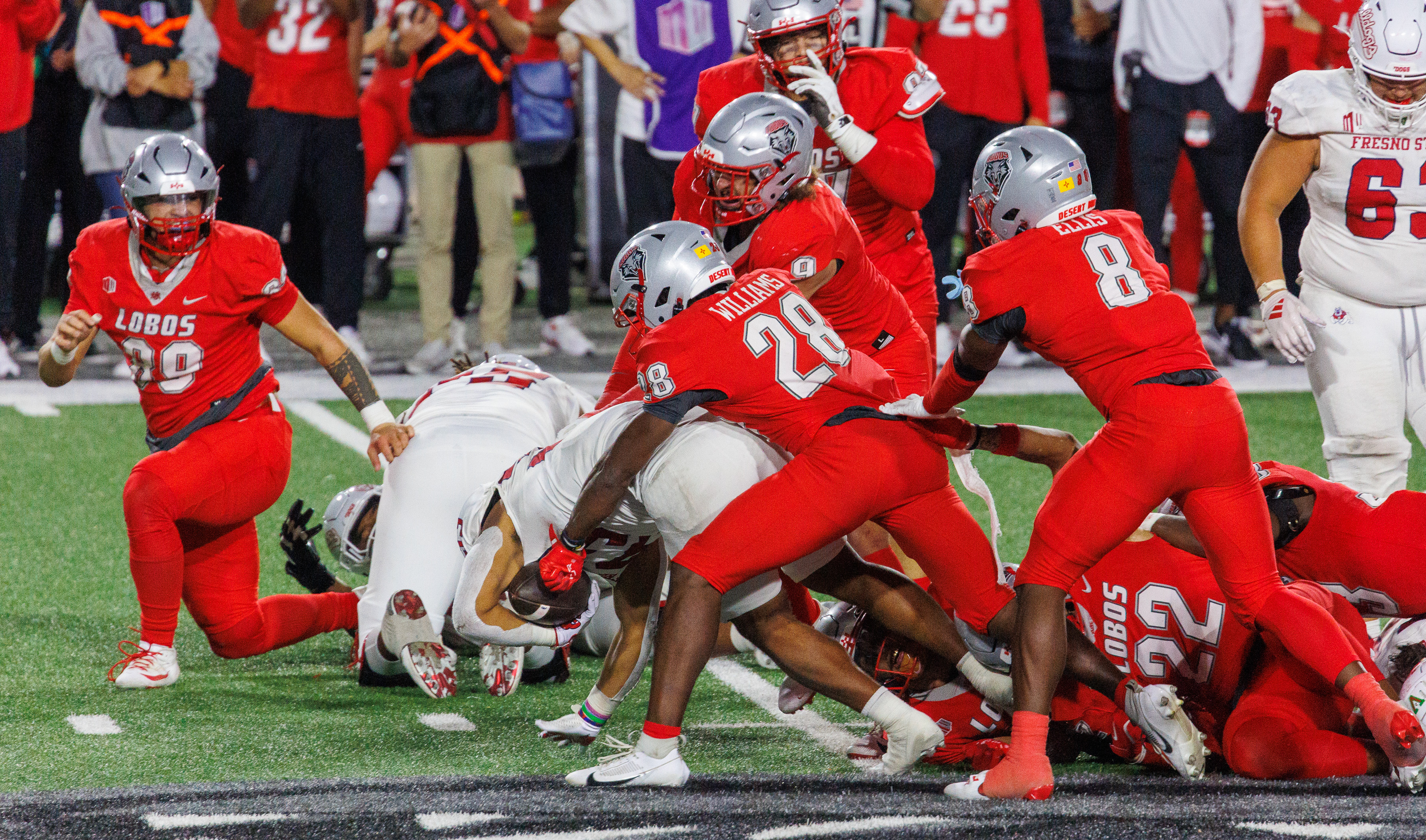
The Lobos against Fresno State on September 21

== Schedule ==
Date	Time	Opponent	Site	TV	Result	Attendance
August 24	2:00 p.m.	No. 4 (FCS) Montana State*	University Stadium; Albuquerque, NM	FS1	L 31–35	17,314
August 31	8:30 p.m.	at No. 21 Arizona*	Arizona Stadium; Tucson, AZ (rivalry)	ESPN	L 39–61	44,748
September 14	5:30 p.m.	at Auburn*	Jordan-Hare Stadium; Auburn, AL	ESPN2	L 19–45	88,043
September 21	6:30 p.m.	Fresno State^{†}	University Stadium; Albuquerque, NM	TruTV	L 21–38	18,019
September 28	6:00 p.m.	at New Mexico State*	Aggie Memorial Stadium; Las Cruces, NM (Rio Grande Rivalry)	ESPN+	W 50–40	21,062
October 12	5:00 p.m.	Air Force	University Stadium; Albuquerque, NM	TruTV	W 52–37	15,561
October 19	2:00 p.m.	at Utah State	Maverik Stadium; Logan, UT	TruTV	W 50–45	14,584
October 26	3:00 p.m.	at Colorado State	Canvas Stadium; Fort Collins, CO	Altitude	L 6–17	36,980
November 2	2:00 p.m.	Wyoming	University Stadium; Albuquerque, NM	TruTV	L 45–49	15,046
November 8	8:30 p.m.	at San Diego State	Snapdragon Stadium; San Diego, CA	FS1	W 21–16	21,832
November 16	7:30 p.m.	No. 18 Washington State*	University Stadium; Albuquerque, NM	FS1	W 38–35	14,067
November 30	9:00 p.m.	at Hawaii	Clarence T. C. Ching Athletics Complex; Honolulu, HI	SPEC PPV	L 30–38	12,046
*Non-conference game; ^{†}Homecoming; Rankings from Coaches' Poll released prior to the game

== Preseason ==
=== Mountain West media poll ===
The Mountain West's preseason prediction poll was released on July 10, 2024. New Mexico was predicted to finish 11th in the conference.

== Game summaries ==
=== No. 4 (FCS) Montana State ===
No. 4 (FCS) Montana State Bobcats (0-0) at New Mexico Lobos (0-0) – Game summary

Quarter	1	2	3	4	Total
No. 4 (FCS) Bobcats	0	14	0	21	35
Lobos	10	14	7	0	31

at University Stadium, Albuquerque, New Mexico

- Date: August 24, 2024
- Game time: 2:00 p.m. MDT
- Game weather: Sunny, 90 °F (32 °C)
- Game attendance: 17,314
- Referee: Jonathan Noli
- TV announcers (FS1): Tim Brando (play-by-play), Devin Gardner (analyst), and Josh Sims (sideline)
- Box score

Game information

First quarter

- (10:37) UNM – Christian Ellis 41-yard fumble return, Luke Drzewiecki kick (New Mexico 7–0)
- (4:49) UNM – Luke Drzewiecki 45-yard field goal (Drive: 7 plays, 67 yards, 3:13; New Mexico 10–0)

Second quarter

- (13:45) UNM – Trace Bruckler 12-yard pass from Devon Dampier, Luke Drzewiecki kick (Drive: 8 plays, 68 yards, 3:23; New Mexico 17–0)
- (10:36) MTST – Rylan Schlepp 5-yard pass from Tommy Mellott, Myles Sansted kick (Drive: 6 plays, 75 yards, 3:09; New Mexico 17–7)
- (4:37) MTST – Ty McCullouch 17-yard pass from Tommy Mellott, Myles Sansted kick (Drive: 10 plays, 76 yards, 4:43; New Mexico 17–14)
- (1:33) UNM – Devon Dampier 24-yard run, Luke Drzewiecki kick (Drive: 9 plays, 75 yards, 3:04; New Mexico 24–14)

Third quarter

- (13:03) UNM – Noah Avinger 13-yard fumble return, Luke Drzewiecki kick (New Mexico 31–14)

Fourth quarter

- (1:33) MTST – Tommy Mellott 15-yard run, Myles Sansted kick (Drive: 10 plays, 80 yards, 5:30; New Mexico 31–21)
- (1:33) MTST – Adam Jones 93-yard run, Myles Sansted kick (Drive: 1 play, 93 yards, 0:37; New Mexico 31–28)
- (1:33) MTST – Scottre Humphrey 4-yard run, Myles Sansted kick (Drive: 11 plays, 89 yards, 1:49; Montana State 35–31)

Statistics	MTST	UNM
First downs	27	19
Total yards	567	324
Rushing yards	47–362	28–152
Passing yards	205	172
Passing: Comp–Att–Int	21–32–0	18–26–0
Time of possession	34:40	25:20

Team	Category	Player	Statistics
Montana State	Passing	Tommy Mellott	21/32, 205 yards, 2 TD
Montana State	Rushing	Adam Jones	17 carries, 167 yards, TD
Montana State	Receiving	Ty McCullouch	7 receptions, 66 yards, TD
New Mexico	Passing	Devon Dampier	18/26, 172 yards, TD
New Mexico	Rushing	Eli Sanders	17 carries, 87 yards
New Mexico	Receiving	Luke Wysong	6 receptions, 95 yards

Entering the game, the Bobcats were double-digit favorites to win the game. It was the first time since 2013 that an FCS team was a double-digit favorite to win against an FBS opponent.

=== at No. 21 Arizona (rivalry) ===
New Mexico Lobos (0–1) at No. 21 Arizona Wildcats (0–0) – Game summary

Quarter	1	2	3	4	Total
Lobos	14	10	7	8	39
No. 21 Wildcats	14	13	21	13	61

at Arizona Stadium, Tucson, Arizona

- Date: August 31, 2024
- Game time: 8:30 p.m. MDT/7:30 p.m. MST
- Game weather: Cloudy, 89 °F (32 °C)
- Game attendance: 44,748
- Referee: Stephon Baron
- TV announcers (ESPN): Brian Custer (play-by-play), Rod Gilmore (analyst), and Lauren Sisler (sideline reporter)

Game information

First quarter

- (11:45) ARIZ – Tetairoa McMillan 69-yard pass from Noah Fifita, Tyler Loop kick (Drive: 3 plays, 98 yards, 1:14; Arizona 7–0)
- (7:23) UNM – Luke Wysong 16-yard pass from Devon Dampier, Luke Drzewiecki kick (Drive: 8 plays, 75 yards, 4:22; Tied 7–7)
- (5:06) ARIZ – Tetairoa McMillan 17-yard pass from Noah Fifita, Tyler Loop kick (Drive: 4 plays, 75 yards, 2:17; Arizona 14–7)
- (7:23) UNM – NaQuari Rogers 6-yard pass from Devon Dampier, Luke Drzewiecki kick (Drive: 8 plays, 75 yards, 4:08; Tied 14–14)

Second quarter

- (12:16) ARIZ – Tyler Loop 54-yard field goal (Drive: 4 plays, 2 yards, 1:00; Arizona 17–14)
- (9:17) UNM – Luke Drzewiecki 20-yard field goal (Drive: 9 plays, 72 yards, 2:59; Tied 17–17)
- (4:51) UNM – Devon Dampier 13-yard run, Luke Drzewiecki kick (Drive: 7 plays, 51 yards, 2:34; New Mexico 24–17)
- (4:21) ARIZ – Tetairoa McMillan 78-yard pass from Noah Fifita, Tyler Loop kick (Drive: 3 plays, 78 yards, 0:24; Tied 24–24)
- (0:30) ARIZ – Tyler Loop 46-yard field goal (Drive: 8 plays, 17 yards, 2:52; Arizona 27–24)

Third quarter

- (13:40) ARIZ – Quali Conley 51-yard run, Tyler Loop kick (Drive: 3 plays, 60 yards, 1:11; Arizona 34–24)
- (12:26) ARIZ – Tetairoa McMillan 40-yard pass from Noah Fifita, Tyler Loop kick (Drive: 1 play, 40 yards, 0:09; Arizona 41–24)
- (8:02) UNM – Devon Dampier 7-yard run, Luke Drzewiecki kick (Drive: 10 plays, 75 yards, 4:24; Arizona 41–31)
- (3:13) ARIZ – Quali Conley 1-yard run, Tyler Loop kick (Drive: 8 plays, 77 yards, 4:43; Arizona 48–31)

Fourth quarter

- (10:18) ARIZ – Quali Conley 23-yard run, Tyler Loop kick (Drive: 11 plays, 86 yards, 4:49; Arizona 55–31)
- (4:44) UNM – Caleb Medford 9-yard pass from Devon Dampier, Devon Dampier two-point pass to Eli Sanders (Drive: 13 plays, 75 yards, 5:34; Arizona 55–39)
- (2:24) ARIZ – Jacory Croskey-Merritt 36-yard run, kick failed (Drive: 4 plays, 48 yards, 2:19; Arizona 61–39)

Statistics	UNM	ARIZ
First downs	30	22
Total yards	471	672
Rushing yards	38–211	26–205
Passing yards	260	422
Passing: Comp–Att–Int	24–42–2	19–31–1
Time of possession	34:58	25:02

Team	Category	Player	Statistics
New Mexico	Passing	Devon Dampier	24/42, 260 yards, 3 TD, 2 INT
New Mexico	Rushing	Devon Dampier	15 carries, 130 yards, 2 TD
New Mexico	Receiving	Luke Wysong	8 receptions, 129 yards, TD
Arizona	Passing	Noah Fifita	19/31, 422 yards, 4 TD, INT
Arizona	Rushing	Jacory Croskey-Merritt	13 carries, 106 yards, TD
Arizona	Receiving	Tetairoa McMillan	10 receptions, 304 yards, 4 TD

=== at Auburn ===
Game Three – New Mexico Lobos (0–2) at Auburn Tigers (1–1) – Game summary

Quarter	1	2	3	4	Total
Lobos	10	3	0	6	19
Tigers	14	3	14	14	45

at Jordan-Hare Stadium, Auburn, Alabama

- Date: Saturday September 14, 2024
- Game time: 5:30 p.m. MDT/6:30 CDT
- Game weather: Rain • Temperature: 74 °F (23 °C) • Wind: E 6 mph
- Game attendance: 88,043
- Referee: Lee Hedrick
- TV announcers (ESPN2): Roy Philpott (play-by-play), Sam Acho (analyst), Taylor Davis (sideline reporter)

Game information

First quarter

- UNM – Luke Drzewiecki 33–yard field goal, 11:12. New Mexico 3–0. Drive: 9 plays, 60 yards, 3:48.
- AUB – Camden Brown 10-yard pass from Hank Brown (Towns McGough kick), 7:45. Auburn 7–0. Drive: 9 plays, 32 yards, 3:18.
- UNM – NaQuari Rogers 3–yard rush (Luke Drzewiecki kick), 4:14. New Mexico 10–7. Drive: 10 plays, 75 yards, 3:31.
- AUB – Jarquez Hunter 2–yard rush (Towns McGough kick), 1:12. Auburn 14–10. Drive: 7 plays, 75 yards, 3:02.

Second quarter

- AUB – Towns McGough 24–yard field goal, 13:34. Auburn 17–10. Drive: 5 plays, 27 yards, 1:51.
- UNM – Luke Drzewiecki 21–yard field goal, 10:01. Auburn 17–13. Drive: 11 plays, 71 yards, 3:33.

Third quarter

- AUB – Micah Riley 3-yard pass from Hank Brown (Towns McGough kick), 9:58. Auburn 24–13. Drive: 10 plays, 75 yards, 5:02.
- AUB – Jarquez Hunter 14-yard pass from Hank Brown (Towns McGough kick), 4:55. Auburn 31–13. Drive: 2 plays, 51 yards, 0:38.

Fourth quarter

- UNM – Caleb Medford 4–yard pass from Devon Dampier (pass failed), 13:50. Auburn 31–19. Drive: 12 plays, 74 yards, 5:54.
- AUB – Rivaldo Fairweather 26-yard pass from Hank Brown (Towns McGough kick), 12:08. Auburn 38–19. Drive: 4 plays, 43 yards, 1:32.
- AUB – Damari Alston 22–yard rush (Towns McGough kick), 5:51. Auburn 45–19. Drive: 6 plays, 70 yards, 2:15.

Statistics	UNM	AUB
First downs	22	26
Total yards	448	503
Rushing yards	157	268
Passing yards	291	235
Turnovers	2	2
Time of possession	32:31	27:29

Team	Category	Player	Statistics
New Mexico	Passing	Devon Dampier	22/44, 291 yards, TD, 2 INT
New Mexico	Rushing	Eli Sanders	7 rushes, 72 yards
New Mexico	Receiving	Ryan Davis	6 receptions, 100 yards
Auburn	Passing	Hank Brown	17/25, 235 yards, 4 TD
Auburn	Rushing	Jarquez Hunter	20 rushes, 152 yards, TD
Auburn	Receiving	Camden Brown	4 receptions, 33 yards, TD

=== vs. Fresno State ===
Game Four – Fresno State Bulldogs (2–1) at New Mexico Lobos (0–3) – Game summary

Quarter	1	2	3	4	Total
Bulldogs	8	17	0	10	35
Lobos	3	7	0	11	21

at University Stadium, Albuquerque, New Mexico

- Date: Saturday September 21, 2024
- Game time: 6:30 p.m. MDT
- Game weather: Cloudy • Temperature: 71 °F (22 °C) • Wind: NW 16 mph
- Game attendance: 18,019
- Referee: Cal McNeill
- TV announcers (TruTV): Ari Wolfe (play-by-play) and Darius Walker (sideline)

Game information

First quarter

- (8:37) FRES – Josiah Freeman 5-yard pass from Mikey Keene, Jayden Mandel two-point run (Drive: 10 plays, 39 yards, 4:55; Fresno State 8–0)
- (2:20) UNM – Luke Drzewiecki 20-yard field goal (Drive: 14 plays, 73 yards, 6:09; Fresno State 8–3)

Second quarter

- (11:10) FRES – Bryson Donelson 1-yard run, Dylan Lynch kick (Drive: 11 plays, 75 yards, 6:10; Fresno State 15–3)
- (5:03) FRES – Dylan Lynch 36-yard field goal (Drive: 9 plays, 58 yards, 4:25; Fresno State 18–3)
- (1:24) FRES – Kamron Beachem 26-yard pass from Raylen Sharpe, Dylan Lynch kick (Drive: 4 plays, 58 yards, 0:40; Fresno State 25–3)
- (0:06) UNM – Trace Bruckler 5-yard pass from Devon Dampier, Luke Drzewiecki kick (Drive: 11 plays, 93 yards, 1:12; Fresno State 25–10)

Third quarter

- (4:41) FRES – Dylan Lynch 42-yard field goal (Drive: 14 plays, 57 yards, 7:45; Fresno State 28–10)

Fourth quarter

(12:12) UNM – Luke Drzweiecki 32-yard field goal (Drive: 11 plays, 65 yards, 5:34; Fresno State 28–13) (7:08) FRES – Elijah Gilliam 1-yard run, Dylan Lynch kick (Drive: 5 plays, 12 yards, 1:59; Fresno State 35–13) (3:45) UNM – Javen Jacobs 1-yard run, James Laubstein two-point run (Drive: 9 plays, 75 yards, 3:23; Fresno State 35–21) (1:57) FRES – Dylan Lynch 31-yard field goal (Drive: 6 plays, 28 yards, 1:16; Fresno State 38–21)

Statistics	FRES	UNM
First downs	21	25
Total yards	345	485
Rushing yards	93	147
Passing yards	252	338
Turnovers	0	3
Time of possession	31:17	28:43

Team	Category	Player	Statistics
Fresno State	Passing	Mikey Keene	26/33, 226 yards, TD
Fresno State	Rushing	Elijah Gilliam	18 carries, 54 yards, TD
Fresno State	Receiving	Raylen Sharpe	6 receptions, 49 yards
New Mexico	Passing	Devon Dampier	33/53, 338 yards, TD, 2 INT
New Mexico	Rushing	Devon Dampier	9 carries, 67 yards
New Mexico	Receiving	Luke Wysong	10 receptions, 126 yards

=== at New Mexico State (Rio Grande Rivalry) ===
Game Five – New Mexico Lobos (0–4) at New Mexico State Aggies (1–3) – Game summary

Quarter	1	2	3	4	Total
Lobos	7	14	9	20	50
Aggies	7	3	7	23	40

at Aggie Memorial Stadium, Las Cruces, New Mexico

- Date: Saturday September 28, 2024
- Game time: 6:00 p.m. MDT
- Game weather: Sunny, 93 °F (34 °C)
- Game attendance: 21,062
- Referee: Rory Bernard
- TV announcers (ESPN+): Adam Young (play-by-play) and Danny Knee (analyst)

Game information

First quarter

- UNM – NaQuari Rodgers 3-yard run (Luke Drzewiecki kick), 9:42. Lobos 7–0. Drive: 9 plays, 64 yards, 3:48.
- NMSU – Larenzo McMillan 84-yard run (Abraham Montano kick), 9:25. Tied 7–7. Drive: 1 play, 84 yards, 0:14.

Second quarter

- UNM – Devon Dampier 11-yard run (Luke Drzewiecki kick), 6:44. Lobos 14–7. Drive: 6 plays, 95 yards, 3:07.
- UNM – Devon Dampier 2-yard run (Luke Drzewiecki kick), 0:22. Lobos 21–7. Drive: 11 plays, 67 yards, 4:42.
- NMSU – Abraham Montano 47-yard field goal, 0:00. Lobos 21–10. Drive: 3 plays, 35 yards, 0:19.

Third quarter

- UNM – Devon Dampier 24-yard run (pass failed), 11:53. Lobos 27–10. Drive: 9 plays, 60 yards, 3:01.
- NMSU – Mike Washington 25-yard pass from Santino Marucci (Abraham Montano kick), 7:06. Lobos 27–17. Drive: 10 plays, 60 yards, 4:47.
- UNM – Luke Drzewiecki 20-yard field goal, 1:27. Lobos 30–17. Drive: 11 plays, 72 yards, 5:39.

Fourth quarter

- NMSU – Abraham Montano 30-yard field goal, 14:53. Lobos 30–20. Drive: 5 plays, 63 yards, 1:34.
- UNM – NaQuari Rodgers 4-yard run (kick failed), 12:13. Lobos 36–20. Drive: 5 plays, 75 yards, 2:40.
- NMSU – Mike Washington 10-yard run (pass failed), 6:09. Lobos 36–26. Drive: 4 plays, 51 yards, 2:12.
- UNM – Javen Jacobs 50-yard run (Luke Drzewiecki kick), 5:14. Lobos 43–26. Drive: 3 plays, 51 yards, 0:54.
- NMSU – Santino Marucci 16-yard run (Abraham Montano kick), 2:34. Lobos 43–33. Drive: 9 plays, 76 yards, 2:33.
- UNM – NaQuari Rodgers 29-yard run (Luke Drzewiecki kick), 1:46. Lobos 50–33. Drive: 3 plays, 46 yards, 0:47.
- NMSU – Mike Washington 2-yard run (Abraham Montano kick), 0:52. Lobos 50–40. Drive: 5 plays, 49 yards, 0:46.

Statistics	UNM	NMSU
First downs	28	27
Total yards	579	474
Rushing yards	331	285
Passing yards	248	189
Turnovers	0	0
Time of possession	33:36	26:24

Team	Category	Player	Statistics
New Mexico	Passing	Devon Dampier	13/28, 248 yards
New Mexico	Rushing	NaQuari Rogers	21 carries, 122 yards, 3 TD
New Mexico	Receiving	Caleb Medford	2 receptions, 91 yards
New Mexico State	Passing	Santino Marucci	13/29, 189 yards, TD
New Mexico State	Rushing	Larenzo McMillan	1 carry, 84 yards, TD
New Mexico State	Receiving	T. J. Pride	3 receptions, 63 yards

=== vs. Air Force ===
Game Six – Air Force Falcons (1–4) at New Mexico Lobos (1–4) – Game summary

Quarter	1	2	3	4	Total
Falcons	3	14	0	20	37
Lobos	7	21	17	7	52

at University Stadium, Albuquerque, New Mexico

- Date: Saturday October 12, 2024
- Game time: 5:00 p.m. MDT
- Game weather: Clear • Temperature: 86 °F (30 °C) • Wind: SW 4 mph
- Game attendance: 15,561
- Referee: Michael Cuttone
- TV announcers (TruTV): JB Long (play-by-play), Mike Golic Jr. (analyst) and Bridget Howard (sideline reporter)

Game information

First quarter

- AFA – Matthew Dapore 43-yard field goal, 4:49. Falcons 3–0. Drive: 17 plays, 54 yards, 9:28.
- UNM – Devon Dampier 7-yard run (Luke Drzewiecki kick), 0:14. Lobos 7–3. Drive: 11 plays, 75 yards, 4:35.

Second quarter

- UNM – Luke Wysong 57-yard punt return (Luke Drzewiecki kick), 13:32. Lobos 14–3. Drive: 3 plays, -3 yards, 1:42.
- AFA – Cade Harris 5-yard run (Matthew Dapore kick), 7:44. Lobos 14–10. Drive: 11 plays, 75 yards, 5:48.
- UNM – Nic Trujillo 18-yard pass from Devon Dampier (Luke Drzewiecki kick), 5:05. Lobos 21–10. Drive: 6 plays, 72 yards, 2:31.
- AFA – Tylor Latham 4-yard run (Matthew Dapore kick), 2:46. Lobos 21–17. Drive: 5 plays, 75 yards, 2:19.
- UNM – Devon Dampier 2-yard run (Luke Drzewiecki kick), 0:11. Lobos 28–17. Drive: 11 plays, 75 yards, 2:35.

Third quarter

- UNM – Sol-Jay Maiava-Peters 15-yard run (Luke Drzewiecki kick), 12:49. Lobos 35–17. Drive: 2 plays, 32 yards, 0:30.
- UNM – Luke Drzewiecki 24-yard field goal, 5:37. Lobos 38–17. Drive: 7 plays, 42 yards, 3:12.
- UNM – Eli Sanders 31-yard run (Luke Drzewiecki kick), 1:25. Lobos 45–17. Drive: 3 plays, 44 yards, 1:06.

Fourth quarter

- AFA – Quentin Hayes 18-yard run (Matthew Dapore kick), 12:31. Lobos 45–24. Drive: 9 plays, 75 yards, 3:54.
- UNM – Eli Sanders 35-yard run (Luke Drzewiecki kick), 10:54. Lobos 52–24. Drive: 4 plays, 28 yards, 1:37.
- AFA – Kemper Hodges 11-yard run (Matthew Dapore), 8:27. Lobos 52–31. Drive: 6 plays, 67 yards, 2:21.
- AFA – Quin Smith 39-yard pass from Josh Johnson (pass failed), 2:18. Lobos 52–37. Drive: 5 plays, 73 yards, 1:23.

Statistics	AFA	UNM
First downs	21	21
Total yards	474	434
Rushing yards	325	255
Passing yards	149	179
Turnovers	1	0
Time of possession	35:59	24:01

Team	Category	Player	Statistics
Air Force	Passing	Quentin Hayes	4/7, 79 yards
Air Force	Rushing	Quentin Hayes	18 carries, 103 yards, TD
Air Force	Receiving	Quin Smith	3 receptions, 82 yards, TD
New Mexico	Passing	Devon Dampier	14/19, 179 yards, TD
New Mexico	Rushing	Eli Sanders	5 carries, 80 yards, 2 TD
New Mexico	Receiving	Nic Trujillo	4 receptions, 85 yards, TD

=== at Utah State ===
Game Seven – New Mexico Lobos (2–4) at Utah State Aggies (1–5) – Game summary

Quarter	1	2	3	4	Total
Lobos	0	15	14	21	50
Aggies	14	10	14	7	45

at Maverik Stadium, Logan, Utah

- Date: Saturday October 19, 2024
- Game time: 2:00 p.m. MDT
- Game weather: Sunny, 60 °F (16 °C)
- Game attendance: 14,584
- Referee: Nolan Dumas
- TV announcers (TruTV): Ari Wolfe (play-by-play) and Darius Walker (analyst)

Game information

First quarter

- USU – Spencer Petras 2-yard run (Tanner Cragun kick), 8:18. Aggies 7–0. Drive: 14 plays, 73 yards, 5:26.
- USU – Rahsul Faison 6-yard run (Tanner Cragun kick), 3:02. Aggies 14–0. Drive: 7 plays, 58 yards, 3:04.

Second quarter

- USU – Tanner Cragun 38-yard field goal, 14:55. Aggies 17–0. Drive: 6 plays, 33 yards, 1:45.
- UNM – Javen Jacobs 21-yard pass from Devon Dampier (Trace Bruckler run), 12:16. Aggies 17–8. Drive: 3 plays, 21 yards, 0:44.
- UNM – Ryan Davis 14-yard pass from Devon Dampier (Luke Drzewiecki kick), 5:12. Aggies 17–15. Drive: 10 plays, 90 yards, 4:18.
- USU – Otto Tia 4-yard pass from Spencer Petras (Tanner Cragun kick), 0:32. Aggies 24–15. Drive: 16 plays, 74 yards, 4:33.

Third quarter

- USU – Rahsul Faison 9-yard run (Tanner Cragun kick), 14:04. Aggies 31–15. Drive: 3 plays, 75 yards, 0:56.
- UNM – Devon Dampier 33-yard run (Trace Bruckler run), 11:57. Aggies 31–23. Drive: 4 plays, 75 yards, 2:08.
- USU – Jalen Royals 13-yard pass from Spencer Petras (Tanner Cragun kick), 10:20. Aggies 38–23. Drive: 3 plays, 19 yards, 0:26.
- UNM – Javen Jacobs 15-yard run (run failed), 7:03. Aggies 38–29. Drive: 8 plays, 80 yards, 3:12.

Fourth quarter

- UNM – Eli Sanders 20-yard run (Luke Drzewiecki kick), 10:18. Aggies 38–36. Drive: 7 plays, 51 yards, 3:14.
- USU – Herschel Turner 43-yard run (Tanner Cragun kick), 7:43. Aggies 45–36. Drive: 6 plays, 75 yards, 2:35.
- UNM – Devon Dampier 5-yard run (Luke Drzewiecki kick), 3:53. Aggies 45–43. Drive: 11 plays, 75 yards, 3:50.
- UNM – Eli Sanders 12-yard run (Luke Drzewiecki kick), 1:13. Lobos 50–45. Drive: 4 plays, 34 yards, 1:07.

Statistics	UNM	USU
First downs	28	23
Total yards	552	503
Rushing yards	280	143
Passing yards	272	360
Turnovers	4	2
Time of possession	31:06	28:54

Team	Category	Player	Statistics
New Mexico	Passing	Devon Dampier	17/27, 272 yards, 2 TD, 3 INT
New Mexico	Rushing	Devon Dampier	15 rushes, 105 yards, 2 TD
New Mexico	Receiving	Luke Wysong	10 receptions, 156 yards
Utah State	Passing	Spencer Petras	32/47, 360 yards, 2 TD, INT
Utah State	Rushing	Rahsul Faison	24 rushes, 79 yards, 2 TD
Utah State	Receiving	Jalen Royals	11 receptions, 188 yards, TD

=== at Colorado State ===
Game Eight – New Mexico Lobos (3–4) at Colorado State Rams (4–3) – Game summary

Quarter	1	2	3	4	Total
Lobos	0	3	3	0	6
Rams	0	17	0	0	17

at Canvas Stadium, Fort Collins, Colorado

- Date: Saturday October 26, 2024
- Game time: 3:00 p.m. MDT
- Game weather: Sunny, 69 °F (21 °C)
- Game attendance: 36,980
- Referee: Michael Cuttone
- TV announcers (MW Network): Brian Roth (play-by-play) and Mike Sanford Jr. (analyst)

Game information

First quarter

No scoring plays

Second quarter

- UNM – Luke Drzewiecki 29-yard field goal, 14:13. Lobos 3–0. Drive: 10 plays, 76 yards, 4:15.
- CSU – Caleb Goodie 46-yard pass from Brayden Fowler-Nicolosi (Jordan Noyes kick), 12:41. Rams 7–3. Drive: 4 plays, 79 yards, 1:26.
- CSU – Kobe Johnson 82-yard punt return (Jordan Noyes kick), 9:11. Rams 14–3.
- CSU – Jordan Noyes 47-yard field goal, 0:25. Rams 17–3. Drive: 9 plays, 51 yards, 4:12.

Third quarter

- UNM – Luke Drzewiecki 44-yard field goal, 6:22. Rams 17–6. Drive: 8 plays, 15 yards, 3:37.

Fourth quarter

No scoring plays

Statistics	UNM	CSU
First downs	25	14
Total yards	453	334
Rushing yards	134	192
Passing yards	319	142
Turnovers	4	0
Time of possession	29:35	30:25

Team	Category	Player	Statistics
New Mexico	Passing	Devon Dampier	23/40, 319 yards, 2 INT
New Mexico	Rushing	Eli Sanders	15 carries, 70 yards
New Mexico	Receiving	Ryan Davis	9 receptions, 146 yards
Colorado State	Passing	Brayden Fowler-Nicolosi	11/20, 142 yards, TD
Colorado State	Rushing	Avery Morrow	16 carries, 89 yards
Colorado State	Receiving	Caleb Goodie	3 receptions, 62 yards, TD

=== vs. Wyoming ===
Game Nine – Wyoming Cowboys (1–7) at New Mexico Lobos (3–5) – Game summary

Quarter	1	2	3	4	Total
Cowboys	14	21	0	14	49
Lobos	13	22	10	0	45

at University Stadium, Albuquerque, New Mexico

- Date: Saturday November 2, 2024
- Game time: 2:00 p.m. MDT
- Game weather: Sunny • Temperature: 68 °F (20 °C) • Wind: SW 7 miles per hour (11 km/h)
- Game attendance: 15,046
- Referee: Christian Watson
- TV announcers (TruTV): Ari Wolfe (play-by-play) and Darius Walker (analyst)

Game information

First quarter

- (12:33) UNM – Ryan Davis 10-yard pass from Devon Dampier (Drive: 7 plays, 75 yards, 2:27; New Mexico 6–0)
- (8:41) WYO – Jamari Ferrell 1-yard run, John Hoyland kick (Drive: 9 plays, 75 yards, 3:48; Wyoming 7–6)
- (5:56) UNM – Eli Sanders 34-yard run, Luke Drzewiecki kick (Drive: 8 plays, 75 yards, 2:45; New Mexico 13–7)
- (2:02) WYO – John Michael Gyllenborg 15-yard pass from Kaden Anderson, John Hoyland kick (Drive: 9 plays, 45 yards, 3:46; Wyoming 14–13)

Second quarter

- (14:55) WYO – Kaden Anderson 7-yard run, John Hoyland kick (Drive: 4 plays, 35 yards, 1:17; Wyoming 21–13)
- (11:22) UNM – Devon Dampier 18-yard run, Trace Bruckler rush (Drive: 9 plays, 69 yards, 3:27; Tied 21–21)
- (9:54) WYO – Jaylen Sargent 68-yard pass from Kaden Anderson, John Hoyland kick (Drive: 3 plays, 79 yards, 1:23; Wyoming 28–21)
- (5:20) UNM – Devon Dampier 40-yard run, Luke Drzewiecki kick (Drive: 4 plays, 61 yards, 1:09; Tied 28–28)
- (1:57) WYO – Harrison Waylee 6-yard run, John Hoyland kick (Drive: 7 plays, 75 yards, 3:23; Wyoming 35–28)
- (1:36) UNM – Eli Sanders 75-yard run, Luke Drzewiecki kick (Drive: 2 plays, 81 yards, 0:15; Tied 35–35)

Third quarter

- (9:29) UNM – Luke Drzewiecki 30-yard field goal (Drive: 7 plays, 50 yards, 2:00; New Mexico 38–35)
- (0:40) UNM – Devon Dampier 85-yard run, Luke Drzewiecki kick (Drive: 2 plays, 92 yards, 0:38; New Mexico 45–35)

Fourth quarter

- (12:55) WYO – Wrook Brown 29-yard interception, John Hoyland kick (New Mexico 45–42)
- (4:44) WYO – Justin Stevenson 27-yard pass from Kaden Anderson, John Hoyland kick (Drive: 11 plays, 88 yards, 5:51; Wyoming 49–45)

Statistics	WYO	UNM
First downs	30	22
Total yards	604	576
Rushing yards	262	412
Passing yards	342	164
Turnovers	1	2
Time of possession	37:13	22:47

Team	Category	Player	Statistics
Wyoming	Passing	Kaden Anderson	20/29, 342 yards, 3 TD, INT
Wyoming	Rushing	Harrison Waylee	27 carries, 170 yards, TD
Wyoming	Receiving	Jaylen Sargent	6 receptions, 186 yards, TD
New Mexico	Passing	Devon Dampier	16/31, 164 yards, TD, INT
New Mexico	Rushing	Devon Dampier	12 carries, 207 yards, 3 TD
New Mexico	Receiving	Ryan Davis	6 receptions, 74 yards, TD

=== at San Diego State ===
Game Ten – New Mexico Lobos (3–6) at San Diego State Aztecs (3–5) – Game summary

Quarter	1	2	3	4	Total
Lobos	14	0	0	7	21
Aztecs	3	10	3	0	16

at Snapdragon Stadium, San Diego, California

- Date: Friday November 8, 2024
- Game time: 8:30 p.m. MST/7:30 p.m. PST
- Game weather: Clear • Temperature: 58 °F (14 °C) • Wind: N 1 mile per hour (1.6 km/h)
- Game attendance: 21,832
- Referee: Michael Cuttone
- TV announcers (FS1): Dan Hellie (play-by-play) and Petros Papadakis (analyst)

Game information

First quarter

- UNM (8:46) – Eli Sanders 51 yard run (Luke Drzewiecki kick); 4 plays, 99 yards, 1:24 (New Mexico 7-0)
- SDSU (3:08) – Gabriel Plascencia 22 yard field goal; 13 plays, 71 yards, 5:32 (New Mexico 7-3)
- UNM (2:32) – Eli Sanders 68 yard run (Luke Drzewiecki kick); 2 plays, 81 yards, 0:32 (New Mexico 14-3)

Second quarter

- SDSU (14:52) – Gabriel Plascencia 31 yard field goal; 7 plays, 15 yards, 2:24 (New Mexico 14-6)
- SDSU (2:37) – Marquez Cooper 5 yard pass from Danny O'Neil (Gabriel Plascencia kick); 8 plays, 61 yards, 2:41 (New Mexico 14-13)

Third quarter

- SDSU (1:39) – Gabriel Plascencia 28 yard field goal; 16 plays, 80 yards, 5:20 (San Diego State 16-14)

Fourth quarter

- UNM (13:07) – Ryan Davis 8 yard pass from Devon Dampier (Luke Drzewiecki kick); 9 plays, 65 yards, 3:25 (New Mexico 21-16)

Statistics	UNM	SDSU
First downs	21	26
Total yards	475	341
Rushing yards	300	146
Passing yards	175	195
Turnovers	0	0
Time of possession	24:58	35:02

Team	Category	Player	Statistics
New Mexico	Passing	Devon Dampier	16/24, 175 yards, TD
New Mexico	Rushing	Eli Sanders	16 carries, 173 yards, 2 TD
New Mexico	Receiving	Ryan Davis	5 receptions, 47 yards, TD
San Diego State	Passing	Danny O'Neil	26/41, 195 yards, TD
San Diego State	Rushing	Marquez Cooper	35 carries, 123 yards
San Diego State	Receiving	Jordan Napier	9 receptions, 63 yards

=== vs. No. 18 Washington State ===
Game Eleven – No. 18 Washington State Cougars (8–1) vs New Mexico Lobos (4–6) – Game summary

Quarter	1	2	3	4	Total
No. 18 Cougars	14	14	0	7	35
Lobos	7	7	14	10	38

at University Stadium, Albuquerque, New Mexico

- Date: Saturday November 16, 2024
- Game time: 7:30 p.m.
- Game weather: Clear • Temperature: 47 °F (8 °C) • Wind: NE 6 miles per hour (9.7 km/h)
- Game attendance: 14,067
- Referee: Nolan Dumas
- TV announcers (FS1): Dan Hellie (play-by-play) and Petros Papadakis (analyst)

Game information

First quarter

- (9:32) UNM – Devon Dampier 7-yard run, Luke Drzewiecki kick (Drive: 11 plays, 75 yards, 5:28; New Mexico 7–0)
- (7:27) WSU – Carlos Hernandez 28-yard pass from John Mateer, Dean Janikowski kick (Drive: 5 plays, 90 yards, 1:59; Tied 7–7)
- (1:30) WSU – John Mateer 5-yard run, Dean Janikowski kick (Drive: 10 plays, 74 yards, 4:51; Washington State 14–7)

Second quarter

- (10:21) WSU – Kyle Williams 20-yard pass from John Mateer, Dean Janikowski kick (Drive: 8 plays, 93 yards, 4:03; Washington State 21–7)
- (5:31) UNM – Caleb Medford 42-yard pass from Devon Dampier, Luke Drzewiecki kick (Drive: 5 plays, 71 yards, 1:59; Washington State 21–14)
- (1:10) WSU – Kyle Williams 29-yard pass from John Mateer, Dean Janikowski kick (Drive: 10 plays, 75 yards, 4:21; Washington State 28–14)

Third quarter

- (10:20) UNM – Devon Dampier 33-yard run, Luke Drzewiecki kick (Drive: 10 plays, 80 yards, 3:51; Washington State 28–21)
- (0:25) UNM – Eli Sanders 26-yard run, Luke Drzewiecki kick (Drive: 7 plays, 71 yards, 3:12; Tied 28–28)

Fourth quarter

- (4:40) UNM – Luke Drzewiecki 19-yard field goal (Drive: 13 plays, 86 yards, 7:27; New Mexico 31–28)
- (3:12) WSU – Kyle Williams 37-yard pass from John Mateer, Dean Janikowski kick (Drive: 4 plays, 75 yards, 1:28; Washington State 35–31)
- (0:21) UNM – Devon Dampier 1-yard run, Luke Drzewiecki kick (Drive: 11 plays, 75 yards, 2:51; New Mexico 38–35)

Statistics	WSU	UNM
First downs	27	27
Total yards	547	534
Rushing yards	172	360
Passing yards	375	174
Turnovers	0	0
Time of possession	28:48	31:12

Team	Category	Player	Statistics
Washington State	Passing	John Mateer	25/36, 375 yards, 4 TD
Washington State	Rushing	John Mateer	9 carries, 65 yards, TD
Washington State	Receiving	Kyle Williams	9 receptions, 181 yards, 3 TD
New Mexico	Passing	Devon Dampier	11/25, 174 yards, TD
New Mexico	Rushing	Devon Dampier	28 carries, 193 yards, 3 TD
New Mexico	Receiving	Luke Wysong	5 receptions, 71 yards

=== at Hawaii ===
Game Twelve – New Mexico Lobos (5–6) vs Hawaii Rainbow Warriors (4–7) – Game summary

Quarter	1	2	3	4	Total
Lobos	0	9	7	14	30
Rainbow Warriors	7	14	10	7	38

at Clarence T.C. Ching Athletics Complex • Honolulu, HI

- Date: Saturday November 30, 2024
- Game time: 11:00 PM EST
- Game weather: 0 °F (−18 °C)
- Game attendance: 12,046
- TV announcers (SPEC PPV): Kanoa Leahey (play-by-play), Rich Miano (analyst) and Jordan Helle (sideline)

Game information

First quarter

- HAW (7:37) – Pofele Ashlock 3 yard pass from Micah Alejado (Kansei Matsuzawa kick); 12 plays, 94 yards, 5:04 (Hawaii 7-0)

Second quarter

- UNM (13:06) – Devon Dampier 3 yard run (2-point conversion failed); 14 plays, 88 yards, 5:24 (Hawaii 7-6)
- HAW (12:26) – Dekel Crowdus 52 yard pass from Micah Alejado (Kansei Matsuzawa kick); 3 plays, 75 yards, 0:40 (Hawaii 14-6)
- UNM (8:29) – Luke Drzewiecki 36 yard field goal; 11 plays, 64 yards, 3:53 (Hawaii 14-9)
- HAW (2:29) – Tamatoa Mokiao-Atimalala 15 yard pass from Micah Alejado (Kansei Matsuzawa kick); 6 plays, 40 yards, 1:39 (Hawaii 21-9)

Third quarter

- HAW (11:58) – Nick Cenacle 3 yard pass from Micah Alejado (Kansei Matsuzawa kick); 9 plays, 75 yards, 3:02 (Hawaii 28-9)
- UNM (6:56) – Devon Dampier 2 yard run (Luke Drzewiecki kick); 4 plays, 35 yards, 1:21 (Hawaii 28-16)
- HAW (1:23) – Kansei Matsuzawa 19 yard field goal; 13 plays, 74 yards, 5:33 (Hawaii 31-16)

Fourth quarter

- UNM (13:53) – Devon Dampier 1 yard run (Luke Drzewiecki kick); 7 plays, 75 yards, 2:30 (Hawaii 31-23)
- HAW (8:48) – Tamatoa Mokiao-Atimalala 3 yard pass from Micah Alejado (Kansei Matsuzawa kick); 10 plays, 75 yards, 5:05 (Hawaii 38-23)
- UNM (2:34) – NaQuari Rogers 1 yard run (Luke Drzewiecki kick); 14 plays, 75 yards, 6:14 (Hawaii 38-30)

Statistics	UNM	HAW
First downs	30	28
Total yards	481	586
Rushing yards	305	102
Passing yards	176	484
Passing: Comp–Att–Int	19-31-0	39–59–0
Time of possession	29:00	31:00

Team	Category	Player	Statistics
New Mexico	Passing	Devon Dampier	19/31, 176 yards
New Mexico	Rushing	Eli Sanders	17 carries, 121 yards
New Mexico	Receiving	Luke Wysong	9 receptions, 69 yards
Hawaii	Passing	Micah Alejado	37/57, 469 yards, 5 TD
Hawaii	Rushing	Micah Alejado	10 carries, 54 yards
Hawaii	Receiving	Spencer Curtis	7 receptions, 100 yards

== Personnel ==
=== Transfers ===
==== Outgoing ====
Player	Position	Destination
Christian Washington	RB	Coastal Carolina
DJ Wingfield	OT	Purdue
Tavian Combs	S	Withdrawn
Devon Smith	OT	Louisiana–Monroe
Jacob Trussell	TE	Unknown
Jermarius Lewis	S	UTSA (Note: Originally committed to Southern Miss.)
Christian Ellis	S	Withdrawn
Andrew Henry	RB	Withdrawn
J. C. Davis	OT	Illinois
Zach Morris	CB	UTSA (Note: Originally committed to San Diego State.)
CJ James	TE	UTSA
Ezra Sexton	WR	East Tennessee State
Reese Steele	IOL	Louisiana–Monroe
Wyatt McClour	TE	Louisiana–Monroe
Sam Telesa	IOL	Louisiana–Monroe
Jacob Godfrey	WR	Louisiana–Monroe
Austin Ackel	TE	Louisiana-Monroe
Shancco Matautia	IOL	Arizona State
Marvin Covington	S	TBD
Aidan Armenta	QB	Louisiana-Monroe
Duece Jones	WR	Grambling State
Hunter Sellers	CB	TBD
Alec Marenco	LB	Kansas State
D'Arco Perkins-McAllister	CB	TBD
Jacory Croskey-Merritt	RB	Arizona

==== Incoming ====
Player	Position	Previous School
Javen Jacobs	RB	Arizona State
Elvin Harris	OT	Campbell
Richard Pierce	IOL	East Carolina
Wallace Unamba	OT	Florida Atlantic
Shawn Miller	WR	Illinois
Eli Sanders	RB	Iowa State
Noah Avinger	CB	San Diego State
Isaiah Jones	WR	Syracuse
James Bailey	IOL	Texas A&M
Lajuan Owens	IOL	Tulane
Okiki Olorunfunmi	EDGE	Weber State
