= Walker White =

American football player (born 2005)

No. 8 – Central Arkansas Bears
- Position: Quarterback
- Class: (redshirt) Sophomore

Personal information
- Born: May 2, 2005 (age 21); Little Rock, Arkansas, U.S.
- Listed height: 6 ft 4 in (1.93 m)
- Listed weight: 225 lb (102 kg)

Career information
- High school: Little Rock Christian Academy (Little Rock, Arkansas)
- College: Auburn (2024); Baylor (2025); Central Arkansas (2026–present)
- Stats at ESPN

Walker White (born May 2, 2005) is an American college football quarterback for the Central Arkansas Bears. He previously played for the Auburn Tigers and Baylor Bears.

== Early life ==
White grew up in Little Rock, Arkansas, and attended Little Rock Christian Academy, where he was a three-year starter for coach Eric Cohu. As team captain he passed for 2,660 yards and 29 touchdowns as a senior, leading the Warriors to the Class 6A state championship game. He was named offensive player of the year, was included in the all-state team. Following a successful high-school career during which he passed for 6,837 yards, completed 80 touchdown passes, and rushed for 30 touchdowns, he was named to the All-American Bowl.

For recruitment he received four stars from Rivals, On3, 247Sports, and ESPN, with Rivals and ESPN rating him among the top five QB prospects nationally. He received more than 20 total scholarship offers. He committed to play college football at Auburn after considering offers from Alabama, Arkansas, Arkansas State, and Baylor, among others. White's great-grandfather, grandfather, uncle and brother all played football at Arkansas.

== College career ==
As a freshman, White and Hank Brown initially competed for the backup job in summer practice, as Payton Thorne was named the starter at Auburn. White was named third-string initially. Following Auburn's week 2 loss against Cal, coach Hugh Freeze would make a quarterback change, going with Brown instead of Thorne. Two weeks later Thorne was back instead of Brown, due to poor play. White, despite the struggles of the two in front of him on the depth chart, played in only one game all season, against UL Monroe, completing two passes of his five attempts for 18 yards.

Following the end of the season, Hank Brown announced that he was transferring to Iowa, and Auburn announced that both Ashton Daniels and Jackson Arnold would be coming in as transfers.

On December 28, 2024, White announced that he was transferring to Baylor.

On January 11, 2026, White transferred to Central Arkansas.
