= Connor Gibbs =

Connor Gibbs may refer to:

- Connor Gibbs (actor), American actor
- Connor Gibbs (American football), American football player
