= Towns McGough =

American football player

No. 33 – California Golden Bears
- Position: Kicker
- Class: Redshirt Sophomore

Personal information
- Born: Auburn, Alabama, U.S.
- Listed height: 6 ft 0 in (1.83 m)
- Listed weight: 200 lb (91 kg)

Career information
- High school: Auburn (Auburn, Alabama)
- College: Auburn (2024–2025); California (2026–present)
- Stats at ESPN

Towns McGough is an American football kicker for the California Golden Bears. He previously played for the Auburn Tigers.

== Early life ==
McGough attended Auburn High School, where he was the lead scorer for the team in his senior year. He chose to attend Auburn University, to play football as a walk on.

== College career ==
=== Auburn ===
In the pre-season, McGough scored seven field goals, including a 58-yard one during the spring practice game. In August, it was ruled that starting kicker Alex McPherson would not start in Auburn's first game of the year against Alabama A&M, McGough was selected as the starting kicker. He scored his first field goal attempt, as well as ten extra points in his first career match. His performance declined throughout the year, and he was replaced as the starting kicker by Ian Vachon after eight starts.

Chad Lunsford, the Auburn special teams coordinator, commented that McGough and McPherson would be the two primary placekickers for the season. During a field goal attempt against the Ball State Cardinals, McGough suffered a minor ankle injury. He was replaced as the designated long field goal kicker by Connor Gibbs the following week. He announced that he would enter the transfer portal in December 2025.

=== California ===
McGough committed to California on January 12, 2026.

=== Career statistics ===
Year	Team	GP	Field goals				Extra points			Total points
Year	Team	GP	FGM	FGA	FG%	Lng	XPM	XPA	XP%	Total points
2024	Auburn	12	5	12	41.7	32	27	27	100.0	42
2025	Auburn	2	0	1	0.0	N/A	0	0	N/A	0

== Personal life ==
McGough was born in Auburn, Alabama.
