= Adam Jones (running back) =

American football player

No. 23 – Montana State Bobcats
- Position: Running back
- Class: Redshirt Sophomore

Personal information
- Listed height: 6 ft 1 in (1.85 m)
- Listed weight: 200 lb (91 kg)

Career information
- High school: Sentinel (Missoula, Montana)
- College: Montana State (2023–present)

Awards and highlights
- Big Sky Freshman of the Year (2024)
- Stats at ESPN

Adam Jones is an American football running back for the Montana State Bobcats.

== Early life ==
Jones attended Sentinel High School in Missoula, Montana. Coming out of high school, he was rated as a three-star recruit and committed to play college football for the Montana State Bobcats.

== College career ==
As a freshman in 2023, Jones took a redshirt. In week 1 of the 2024 season, he rushed for 167 yards and a career-long 93 yard touchdown run in an upset win over New Mexico. He finished the 2024 season rushing for 1,172 yards and 14 touchdowns, both school records for a freshman, while also hauling in 21 passes for 214 yards and a touchdown. He was named the Big Sky freshman of the year. Heading into the 2025 season, Jones was named to the Walter Payton Award preseason watchlist. In week 7 of the 2025 season, he ran for 173 yards and a touchdown on 16 carries in a blowout win against Idaho State. In the second round of the 2025 FCS playoffs, Jones ran for 107 yards and a touchdown on 18 carries in a win versus Yale. In the quarterfinals, he ran for 114 yards and two touchdowns, while also hauling in five passes for 46 yards and a touchdown in a victory over Stephen F. Austin.
