= 2023 Auburn Tigers football team =

American college football season

2023 Auburn Tigers football

Music City Bowl, L 13–31 vs. Maryland
- Conference: Southeastern Conference
- Western Division
- Record: 6–7 (3–5 SEC)
- Head coach: Hugh Freeze (1st season)
- Offensive coordinator: Philip Montgomery (1st season)
- Offensive scheme: Veer and shoot
- Defensive coordinator: Ron Roberts (1st season)
- Base defense: Multiple
- Home stadium: Jordan–Hare Stadium

2023 Southeastern Conference football standings
	Conf.			Overall
Team	W		L	W		L
Eastern Division
No. 4 Georgia xy	8	–	0	13	–	1
No. 8 Missouri	6	–	2	11	–	2
No. 17 Tennessee	4	–	4	9	–	4
Kentucky	3	–	5	7	–	6
Florida	3	–	5	5	–	7
South Carolina	3	–	5	5	–	7
Vanderbilt	0	–	8	2	–	10
Western Division
No. 5 Alabama xy$^	8	–	0	12	–	2
No. 9 Ole Miss	6	–	2	11	–	2
No. 12 LSU	6	–	2	10	–	3
Texas A&M	4	–	4	7	–	6
Auburn	3	–	5	6	–	7
Mississippi State	1	–	7	5	–	7
Arkansas	1	–	7	4	–	8
Championship: Alabama 27, Georgia 24
^ – College Football Playoff participant; $ – Conference champion; x – Division champion/co-champions; y – Championship game participant; Rankings from AP Poll

The 2023 Auburn Tigers football team represented Auburn University in the 2023 NCAA Division I FBS football season. The Tigers were led by first-year head coach Hugh Freeze, and competed as members of the Western Division of the Southeastern Conference (SEC). They played their home games at Jordan–Hare Stadium in Auburn, Alabama.

== Offseason ==
=== Transfers ===
Outgoing

Name	Number	Pos.	Height	Weight	Year	Hometown	Transfer to
Armani Diamons	#10	CB	5'11	170	Freshman (redshirt)	Mobile, AL	UAB
Ze'Vian Capers	#80	WR	6'4	195	Junior	Alpharetta, GA	Western Kentucky
J.J. Evans	#81	WR	6'2	224	Sophomore (redshirt)	Montevallo, AL	North Alabama
Zach Calzada	#10	QB	6'4	208	Junior (redshirt)	Sugar Hill, GA	Incarnate Word
Keiondre Jones	#58	IOL	6'4	340	Junior (redshirt)	LaGrange, GA	Florida State
Dazalin Worsham	#8	WR	6'1	177	Sophomore (redshirt)	Birmingham, AL	UAB
Joko Willis	#33	LB	6'3	212	Sophomore (redshirt)	LaGrange, GA	Nebraska-Kearney
Jordon Ingram	#24	RB	6'1	209	Sophomore (redshirt)	Mobile, AL	Troy
Tar'Varish Dawson	#3	WR	5'11	165	Sophomore (redshirt)	Fort Myers, FL	Colorado
Jeffrey M'Ba	#5	DL	6'6	313	Junior	Libreville, Gabon	Purdue
Desmond Tisdol	#30	LB	6'0	215	Senior	Rochelle, GA	Florida Atlantic
Craig McDonald	#24	S	6'2	190	Freshman (redshirt)	Minneapolis, MN	Minnesota
Tobechi Okoli	#58	DL	6'5	255	Sophomore (redshirt)	Kansas City, MO	Iowa State
Dylan Brooks	#39	DL	6'5	250	Freshman (redshirt)	Roanoke, AL	Kansas
Landen King	#14	WR	6'5	220	Sophomore (redshirt)	Humble, TX	Utah
Colby Smith	#69	IOL	6'7	318	Sophomore (redshirt)	Reidsville, NC	Troy
T.J. Finley	#1	QB	6'6	250	Junior	Ponchatoula, LA	Texas State

Incoming

Name	Number	Pos.	Height	Weight	Year	Hometown	Prev. school
Gunner Britton	#53	OL	6'6	305	Senior (redshirt)	Conway, SC	Western Kentucky
Avery Jones	#66	OL	6'4	288	Senior (redshirt)	Havelock, NC	ECU
Rivaldo Fairweather	#13	TE	6'5	245	Junior (redshirt)	Lauderhill, FL	FIU
Nick Mardner	#8	WR	6'6	215	Senior (redshirt)	Mississauga, Ontario	Cincinnati
Elijah McAllister	#11	DL	6'6	265	Junior (redshirt)	Rumson, NJ	Vanderbilt
Dillon Wade	#52	OL	6'4	290	Junior	Houston, TX	Tulsa
Lawrence Johnson	#92	DL	6'3	310	Senior (redshirt)	Fort Wayne, IN	Purdue
Mosiah Nasili-Kite	#33	DL	6'2	310	Senior (redshirt)	Pittsburgh, CA	Maryland
Justin Rogers	#52	DL	6'3	333	Senior	Detroit, Michigan	Kentucky
DeMario Tolan		LB	6'2	222	Sophomore	Orlando, FL	LSU
Austin Keys	#12	LB	6'2	245	Junior (redshirt)	Collins, MS	Ole Miss
Brian Battie	#21	RB	5'8	165	Senior	Sarasota, FL	USF
Jaden Muskrat	#63	OL	6'4	275	Sophomore (redshirt)	Centerton, AR	Tulsa
Caleb Burton III	#10	WR	5'10	155	Freshman	Del Valle, TX	Ohio State
Jalen McLeod	#35	LB	6'2	220	Sophomore	Washington D.C.	App State
Payton Thorne	#1	QB	6'2	187	Junior	Naperville, IL	Michigan State
Jyaire Shorter	#14	TE	6'2	215	Senior (redshirt)	Killeen, TX	North Texas
Larry Nixon III	#30	LB	6'2	205	Senior (redshirt)	North Richland Hills, TX	North Texas
Stephen Sings V	#18	EDGE	6'3	225	Junior	Charlotte, NC	Liberty
Shane Hooks	#11	WR	6'5	190	Senior (redshirt)	Orlando, FL	Jackson State

== Personnel ==
=== Coaching staff ===
Auburn Tigers coaches
Hugh Freeze	Head coach	1st
Carnell "Cadillac" Williams	Associate head coach/ Running backs	5th
Philip Montgomery	Offensive coordinator	1st
Ron Roberts	Defensive coordinator	1st
Ben Aigamaua	Tight ends coach	1st
Josh Aldridge	Linebackers coach	1st
Marcus Davis	Wide receivers coach	1st
Zac Etheridge	Secondary coach/ Safeties	3rd
Jeremy Garrett	Defensive line coach	1st
Wesley McGriff	Secondary coach/ Cornerbacks	1st
Jake Thornton	Offensive line coach	1st

== Schedule ==
Auburn and the SEC announced the 2023 football schedule on September 20, 2022. The 2023 Tigers' schedule consists of 7 home games and 5 away games for the regular season. Auburn will host four SEC conference opponents: Alabama (Iron Bowl), Georgia (Deep South's Oldest Rivalry), Mississippi State and Ole Miss (rivalry). The Tigers will travel to four SEC opponents: Arkansas, LSU (rivalry), Texas A&M and Vanderbilt. The Tigers' bye week comes during week 6 (on October 7, 2023).

Auburn out of conference opponents represented the CUSA, Pac-12, and SoCon conferences and one FBS independent school. The Tigers hosted three of the four non–conference games, against New Mexico State from CUSA, UMass, and Samford. The Tigers traveled to California from the Pac-12.

Date	Time	Opponent	Site	TV	Result	Attendance
September 2	2:30 p.m.	UMass*	Jordan-Hare Stadium; Auburn, AL	ESPN	W 59–14	88,043
September 9	9:30 p.m.	at California*	California Memorial Stadium; Berkeley, CA	ESPN	W 14–10	44,141
September 16	6:00 p.m.	No. 18 (FCS) Samford*^{†}	Jordan-Hare Stadium; Auburn, AL	ESPN+/SECN+	W 45–13	88,043
September 23	11:00 a.m.	at Texas A&M	Kyle Field; College Station, TX (SEC Nation)	ESPN	L 10–27	102,530
September 30	2:30 p.m.	No. 1 Georgia	Jordan-Hare Stadium; Auburn, AL (Deep South's Oldest Rivalry)	CBS	L 20–27	88,043
October 14	6:00 p.m.	at No. 22 LSU	Tiger Stadium; Baton Rouge, LA (rivalry)	ESPN	L 18–48	102,321
October 21	6:00 p.m.	No. 13 Ole Miss	Jordan-Hare Stadium; Auburn, AL (rivalry)	ESPN	L 21–28	88,043
October 28	2:30 p.m.	Mississippi State	Jordan-Hare Stadium; Auburn, AL	SECN	W 27–13	88,043
November 4	3:00 p.m.	at Vanderbilt	FirstBank Stadium; Nashville, TN	SECN	W 31–15	28,500
November 11	3:00 p.m.	at Arkansas	Donald W. Reynolds Razorback Stadium; Fayetteville, AR	SECN	W 48–10	72,033
November 18	3:00 p.m.	New Mexico State*	Jordan-Hare Stadium; Auburn, AL	SECN	L 10–31	88,043
November 25	2:30 p.m.	No. 8 Alabama	Jordan-Hare Stadium; Auburn, AL (Iron Bowl, SEC Nation)	CBS	L 24–27	88,043
December 30	1:00 p.m.	vs. Maryland*	Nissan Stadium; Nashville, TN (Music City Bowl)	ABC	L 13–31	50,088
*Non-conference game; ^{†}Homecoming; Rankings from AP Poll (and CFP Rankings, after November 1) – Released prior to game; All times are in Central time

== Game summaries ==
=== UMass ===
Game One – UMass Minutemen (1–0) at Auburn Tigers (0–0)

Quarter	1	2	3	4	Total
Minutemen	7	0	0	7	14
Tigers	10	21	21	7	59

at Jordan–Hare Stadium • Auburn, Alabama

- Date: Saturday, September 2, 2023
- Game time: 2:35 p.m. CDT
- Game weather: Sunny • Temperature: 83 °F (28 °C) • Wind: E 8 mph
- Game attendance: 88,043
- Referee: Lee Hedrick
- TV announcers (ESPN): Beth Mowins (play-by-play), Kirk Morrison (analyst), Stormy Buonantony (sideline reporter)

Statistics	MASS	AUB
First downs	11	27
Plays–yards	51–301	69–492
Rushes–yards	27–140	44–289
Passing yards	161	203
Passing: comp–att–int	14–24–1	14–25–0
Turnovers		
Time of possession	28:25	28:20

Team	Category	Player	Statistics
UMass	Passing	Taisun Phommachanh	8/16, 55 yds, INT
UMass	Rushing	Kay'ron Adams	14 rushes, 101 yds
UMass	Receiving	Anthony Simpson	4 receptions, 89 yds, TD
Auburn	Passing	Payton Thorne	10/17, 141 yds, TD
Auburn	Rushing	Sean Jackson	5 rushes, 64 yds, TD
Auburn	Receiving	Jay Fair	5 receptions, 56 yds, TD

=== California ===
Game Two – Auburn Tigers (1–0) at California Golden Bears (1–0)

Quarter	1	2	3	4	Total
Tigers	0	7	0	7	14
Golden Bears	3	7	0	0	10

at California Memorial Stadium • Berkeley, California

- Date: Saturday, September 9, 2023
- Game time: 9:40 p.m. CDT
- Game weather: Sunny • Temperature: 66 °F (19 °C) • Wind: NE 8 mph
- Game attendance: 44,141
- Referee: Daniel Gautreaux
- TV announcers (ESPN): Dave Flemming (play-by-play), Brock Osweiler (analyst), Kayla Burton (sideline reporter)

Statistics	AUB	CAL
First downs	12	19
Plays–yards	55–230	78–273
Rushes–yards	38–136	40–113
Passing yards	94	160
Passing: comp–att–int	10–17–1	21–38–2
Turnovers		
Time of possession	25:12	34:48

Team	Category	Player	Statistics
Auburn	Passing	Payton Thorne	9/14, 94 yds, 2 TD, INT
Auburn	Rushing	Jarquez Hunter	11 carries, 53 yds
Auburn	Receiving	Rivaldo Fairweather	3 receptions, 39 yds, TD
California	Passing	Sam Jackson V	14/27, 126 yds, 2 INT
California	Rushing	Jaydn Ott	20 carries, 78 yds, TD
California	Receiving	Jeremiah Hunter	5 receptions, 35 yds

=== No. 18 (FCS) Samford ===
Game Three – No. 18 (FCS) Samford Bulldogs (1–1) at Auburn Tigers (2–0)

Quarter	1	2	3	4	Total
No. 18 (FCS) Bulldogs	0	0	13	0	13
Tigers	0	17	14	14	45

at Jordan–Hare Stadium • Auburn, Alabama

- Date: Saturday, September 16, 2023
- Game time: 6:02 p.m. CDT
- Game weather: Cloudy • Temperature: 76 °F (24 °C)
- Game attendance: 88,043
- Referee: David Smith
- TV announcers (ESPN+/SEC Network+): Clay Matvick (play-by-play), Aaron Murray (analyst)

Statistics	SAM	AUB
First downs	12	26
Plays–yards	61–218	79–562
Rushes–yards	28–74	43–222
Passing yards	144	340
Passing: comp–att–int	19–33–2	27–36–2
Turnovers		
Time of possession	26:32	33:28

Team	Category	Player	Statistics
Samford	Passing	Michael Hiers	18/31, 141 yds, TD, 2 INT
Samford	Rushing	Damonta Witherspoon	5 carries, 30 yds
Samford	Receiving	Ty King	5 receptions, 24 yds
Auburn	Passing	Payton Thorne	24/32, 282 yds, TD, 2 INT
Auburn	Rushing	Payton Thorne	11 carries, 123 yds, 2 TD
Auburn	Receiving	Jay Fair	7 receptions, 93 yds

=== Texas A&M ===
Game Four – Auburn Tigers (3–0) at Texas A&M Aggies (2–1)

Quarter	1	2	3	4	Total
Tigers	0	3	0	7	10
Aggies	6	0	14	7	27

at Kyle Field • College Station, Texas

- Date: Saturday, September 23, 2023
- Game time: 11:07 a.m. CDT
- Game weather: Sunny • Temperature: 86 °F (30 °C) • Wind: S 13 mph
- Game attendance: 102,530
- Referee: Kyle Olson
- TV announcers (ESPN): Bob Wischusen (play-by-play), Robert Griffin III (analyst), Kris Budden (sideline reporter)

Game information
First quarter
- TAMU – Randy Bond 51-yard field goal, 9:23. Aggies 3–0. Drive: 12 plays, 41 yards, 5:37.
- TAMU – Randy Bond 32-yard field goal, 5:32. Aggies 6–0. Drive: 7 plays, 43 yards, 2:18.

Second quarter

- AUB – Alex McPherson 53-yard field goal, 0:05. Aggies 6–3. Drive: 8 plays, 8 yards, 4:28.

Third quarter

- TAMU – Jake Johnson 22-yard pass from Max Johnson (Randy Bond kick), 9:42. Aggies 13–3. Drive: 6 plays, 46 yards, 3:16.
- TAMU – Evan Stewart 37-yard pass from Max Johnson (Randy Bond kick), 6:22. Aggies 20–3. Drive: 5 plays, 65 yards, 2:15.

Fourth quarter

- AUB – Eugene Asante 67-yard fumble return (Alex McPherson kick), 12:16. Aggies 20–10.
- TAMU – Le'Veon Moss 4-yard run (Randy Bond kick), 3:59. Aggies 27–10. Drive: 3 plays, 86 yards, 1:04.

Statistics	AUB	TXAM
First downs	14	16
Total yards	64–200	58–402
Rushing yards	41–144	33–209
Passing yards	56	193
Passing: Comp–Att–Int	9–23–0	15–25–0
Time of possession	32:10	27:50

Team	Category	Player	Statistics
Auburn	Passing	Payton Thorne	6/12, 44 yards
Auburn	Rushing	Brian Battie	8 carries, 59 yards
Auburn	Receiving	Brian Battie	2 receptions, 23 yards
Texas A&M	Passing	Max Johnson	7/11, 123 yards, 2 TD
Texas A&M	Rushing	Le'Veon Moss	15 carries, 97 yards, TD
Texas A&M	Receiving	Ainias Smith	5 receptions, 78 yards

=== No. 1 Georgia ===
Game Five – No. 1 Georgia Bulldogs (4–0) at Auburn Tigers (3–1)

Quarter	1	2	3	4	Total
No. 1 Bulldogs	0	10	7	10	27
Tigers	10	0	7	3	20

at Jordan-Hare Stadium • Auburn, Alabama

- Date: Saturday, September 30, 2023
- Game time: 2:39 p.m. CDT
- Game weather: Sunny • Temperature: 86 °F (30 °C) • Wind: E 6 mph
- Game attendance: 88,043
- Referee: Jason Autrey
- TV announcers (CBS): Brad Nessler (play-by-play), Gary Danielson (analyst) and Jenny Dell (sideline reporter)

Game information

First quarter

- (6:04) AUB – Alex McPherson 27-yard field goal (Drive: 8 plays, 84 yards, 3:50; Auburn 3-0)
- (2:00) AUB – Jarquez Hunter 5-yard run (Alex McPherson kick) (Drive: 7 plays, 48 yards, 3:44; Auburn 10-0)

Second quarter

- (11:50) UGA – Daijun Edwards 2-yard run (Peyton Woodring kick) (Drive: 11 plays, 56 yards, 5:01; Auburn 10-7)
- (5:57) UGA – Peyton Woodring 37-yard field goal (Drive: 10 plays, 61 yards, 3:55; Tied 10-10)

Third quarter

- (13:31) AUB – Robby Ashford 9-yard run (Alex McPherson kick) (Drive: 3 plays, 32 yards, 1:11; Auburn 17-10)
- (1:03) UGA – Daijun Edwards 13-yard run (Peyton Woodring kick) (Drive: 10 plays, 98 yards, 4:24; Tied 17-17)

Fourth quarter

- (10:57) UGA – Peyton Woodring 38-yard field goal (Drive: 7 plays, 71 yards, 3:37; Georgia 20-17)
- (6:21) AUB – Alex McPherson 42-yard field goal (Drive: 9 plays, 51 yards, 4:29; Tied 20-20)
- (2:52) UGA – Brock Bowers 40-yard pass from Carson Beck (Peyton Woodring kick) (Drive: 7 plays, 75 yards, 3:29; Georgia 27-20)

Statistics	UGA	AUB
First downs	19	17
Total yards	63–420	63–307
Rushing yards	30–107	43–219
Passing yards	313	88
Passing: Comp–Att–Int	23–33–1	11–20–1
Time of possession	29:51	30:09

Team	Category	Player	Statistics
Georgia	Passing	Carson Beck	23/33, 313 yards, TD, INT
Georgia	Rushing	Daijun Edwards	19 carries, 76 yards, 2 TD
Georgia	Receiving	Brock Bowers	8 receptions, 157 yards, TD
Auburn	Passing	Payton Thorne	10/19, 82 yards, INT
Auburn	Rushing	Payton Thorne	12 carries, 92 yards
Auburn	Receiving	Rivaldo Fairweather	4 receptions, 44 yards

=== No. 22 LSU ===
Game Six – Auburn Tigers (3–2) at No. 22 LSU Tigers (4–2)

Quarter	1	2	3	4	Total
Auburn Tigers	0	7	3	8	18
No. 22 LSU Tigers	17	3	14	14	48

at Tiger Stadium • Baton Rouge, Louisiana

- Date: Saturday, October 14, 2023
- Game time: 6:10 p.m. CDT
- Game weather: Sunny • Temperature: 75 °F (24 °C) • Wind: NW 9 mph
- Game attendance: 102,321
- Referee: Kyle Olson
- TV announcers (ESPN): Joe Tessitore (play-by-play), Jesse Palmer (analyst), Katie George (sideline reporter)

Statistics	AUB	LSU
First downs	18	25
Plays–yards	61–293	66–563
Rushes–yards	34–139	39–238
Passing yards	154	325
Passing: comp–att–int	15–27–0	20–27–1
Turnovers		
Time of possession	25:47	34:13

Team	Category	Player	Statistics
Auburn	Passing	Payton Thorne	12/23, 102 yards
Auburn	Rushing	Jeremiah Cobb	10 carries, 69 yards
Auburn	Receiving	Brandon Frazier	3 receptions, 52 yards, TD
LSU	Passing	Jayden Daniels	20/27, 325 yards, 3 TD, INT
LSU	Rushing	Logan Diggs	18 carries, 97 yards, TD
LSU	Receiving	Malik Nabers	6 receptions, 89 yards, TD

=== No. 13 Ole Miss ===
Game Seven – No. 13 Ole Miss Rebels (5–1) at Auburn Tigers (3–3)

Quarter	1	2	3	4	Total
No. 13 Rebels	14	0	7	7	28
Tigers	7	7	0	7	21

at Jordan–Hare Stadium • Auburn, Alabama

- Date: Saturday, October 21, 2023
- Game time: 6:10 p.m. CDT
- Game weather: Sunny • Temperature: 68 °F (20 °C) • Wind: SW 5 mph
- Game attendance: 88,043
- Referee: Lee Hedrick
- TV announcers (ESPN): Joe Tessitore (play-by-play), Jesse Palmer (analyst), Katie George (sideline reporter)

Statistics	MISS	AUB
First downs	20	10
Plays–yards	74–425	56–275
Rushes–yards	56–223	39–153
Passing yards	202	122
Passing: comp–att–int	10–18–2	12–17–2
Turnovers		
Time of possession	34:14	25:46

Team	Category	Player	Statistics
Ole Miss	Passing	Jaxson Dart	10/17, 202 yards, TD, INT
Ole Miss	Rushing	Quinshon Judkins	21 carries, 124 yards, TD
Ole Miss	Receiving	Tre Harris	4 receptions, 102 yards
Auburn	Passing	Payton Thorne	9/13, 100 yards, TD, INT
Auburn	Rushing	Jarquez Hunter	15 carries, 91 yards, 2 TD
Auburn	Receiving	Rivaldo Fairweather	5 receptions, 31 yards, TD

=== Mississippi State ===
Game Eight – Mississippi State Bulldogs (4–3) at Auburn Tigers (3–4)

Quarter	1	2	3	4	Total
Mississippi State	3	0	3	7	13
Auburn	14	10	3	0	27

at Jordan–Hare Stadium • Auburn, Alabama

- Date: Saturday, October 28, 2023
- Game time: 2:35 p.m. CDT
- Game weather: Sunny • Temperature: 80 °F (27 °C) • Wind: SE 5 mph
- Game attendance: 88,043
- Referee: Daniel Gautreaux
- TV announcers (SEC Network): Dave Neal (play-by-play), Derek Mason (analyst), Taylor Davis (sideline reporter)

Statistics	MSST	AUB
First downs	19	21
Plays–yards	67–345	62–416
Rushes–yards	35–184	36–186
Passing yards	161	230
Passing: Comp–Att–Int	16–32–1	20–26–0
Time of possession	30:44	29:16

Team	Category	Player	Statistics
Mississippi State	Passing	Mike Wright	16/32, 161 yards, TD, INT
Mississippi State	Rushing	Mike Wright	14 carries, 63 yards
Mississippi State	Receiving	Zavion Thomas	9 receptions, 112 yards, TD
Auburn	Passing	Payton Thorne	20/26, 230 yards, 3 TD
Auburn	Rushing	Jarquez Hunter	17 carries, 144 yards
Auburn	Receiving	Rivaldo Fairweather	4 receptions, 31 yards

=== at Vanderbilt ===
Game Nine – Auburn Tigers (4–4) at Vanderbilt Commodores (2–7) – Game summart

Quarter	1	2	3	4	Total
Auburn	14	3	14	0	31
Vanderbilt	0	7	8	0	15

at FirstBank Stadium • Nashville, Tennessee

- Date: Saturday, November 4, 2023
- Game time: 3:01 p.m. CDT
- Game weather: Sunny • Temperature: 72 °F (22 °C) • Wind: SW 5 mph
- Game attendance: 28,500
- Referee: Matt Loeffler
- TV announcers (SEC Network): Taylor Zarzour (play-by-play), Aaron Murray (analyst), Taylor Davis (sideline reporter)

Game information

First quarter

- (10:00) AUB – Jarquez Hunter 67-yard run (Alex McPherson kick) (Drive: 2 plays, 75 yards, 0:28; Auburn 7-0)
- (3:01) AUB – Jarquez Hunter 56-yard run (Alex McPherson kick) (Drive: 5 plays, 79 yards, 1:19; Auburn 14-0)

Second quarter

- (12:15) VAN – Bryce Cowan 5-yard interception return (Jacob Borcila kick) (Auburn 14-7)
- (0:20) AUB – Alex McPherson 32-yard field goal (Drive: 11 plays, 31 yards, 4:02; Auburn 17-7)

Third quarter

- (13:36) AUB – Rivaldo Fairweather 53-yard pass from Payton Thorne (Alex McPherson kick) (Drive: 3 plays, 75 yards, 1:16; Auburn 24-7)
- (9:44) AUB – Jeremiah Cobb 5-yard pass from Payton Thorne (Alex McPherson kick) (Drive: 7 plays, 64 yards, 2:13; Auburn 31-7)
- (2:43) VAN – Junior Sherrill 30-yard pass from Ken Seals (Junior Sherrill run) (Drive: 4 plays, 44 yards, 2:34; Auburn 31-15)

Fourth quarter

- No scoring

Statistics	AUB	VAN
First downs	14	12
Plays–yards	64–424	62–266
Rushes–yards	37–230	30–100
Passing yards	194	166
Passing: Comp–Att–Int	17–27–1	17–32–1
Time of possession	26:39	33:21

Team	Category	Player	Statistics
Auburn	Passing	Payton Thorne	17/27, 194 yards, 2 TD, INT
Auburn	Rushing	Jarquez Hunter	19 carries, 183 yards, 2 TD
Auburn	Receiving	Ja'Varrius Johnson	3 receptions, 62 yards
Vanderbilt	Passing	Ken Seals	16/29, 160 yards, TD, INT
Vanderbilt	Rushing	Sedrick Alexander	9 carries, 40 yards
Vanderbilt	Receiving	Will Sheppard	4 receptions, 43 yards

=== Arkansas ===
Game Ten – Auburn Tigers (5–4) at Arkansas Razorbacks (3–6)

Quarter	1	2	3	4	Total
Tigers	21	6	21	0	48
Razorbacks	3	0	0	7	10

at Donald W. Reynolds Razorback Stadium • Fayetteville, Arkansas

- Date: Saturday, November 11, 2023
- Game time: 3:01 p.m. CST
- Game weather: Sunny • Temperature: 61 °F (16 °C) • Wind: SE 6 mph
- Game attendance: 72,033
- Referee: Scott Walker
- TV announcers (SEC Network): Dave Neal (play-by-play), Derek Mason (analyst), Alex Chappell (sideline reporter)

Statistics	AUB	ARK
First downs	32	10
Plays–yards	76–517	52–255
Rushes–yards	55–354	32–120
Passing yards	163	135
Passing: comp–att–int	12–21–2	12–20–0
Turnovers		
Time of possession	38:15	21:45

Team	Category	Player	Statistics
Auburn	Passing	Payton Thorne	12/20, 163 yards, 3 TD, INT
Auburn	Rushing	Jarquez Hunter	16 carries, 109 yards
Auburn	Receiving	Ja'Varrius Johnson	3 receptions, 53 yards, TD
Arkansas	Passing	KJ Jefferson	10/16, 116 yards
Arkansas	Rushing	Jacolby Criswell	6 carries, 64 yards
Arkansas	Receiving	Isaac TeSlaa	3 receptions, 32 yards, TD

=== New Mexico State ===
Game Eleven – New Mexico State Aggies (8–3) at Auburn Tigers (6–4)

Quarter	1	2	3	4	Total
Aggies	7	3	7	14	31
Tigers	0	7	0	3	10

at Jordan–Hare Stadium • Auburn, Alabama

- Date: Saturday, November 18, 2023
- Game time: 3:01 p.m. CST
- Game weather: Sunny • Temperature: 71 °F (22 °C) • Wind: NW 8 mph
- Game attendance: 88,043
- Referee: Ken Williamson
- TV announcers (SEC Network): Dave Neal (play-by-play), Derek Mason (analyst), Taylor Davis (sideline reporter)

Game information
First quarter
- NMSU – Kordell David 9-yard pass from Diego Pavia (Ethan Albertson kick), 9:34. Aggies 7–0. Drive: 11 plays, 75 yards, 5:26.

Second quarter

- AUB – Rivaldo Fairweather 32-yard pass from Payton Thorne (Alex McPherson kick), 6:28. Tied 7–7. Drive: 11 plays, 81 yards, 5:00.
- NMSU – Ethan Albertson 40-yard field goal, 0:26. Aggies 10–7. Drive: 11 plays, 53 yards, 6:02.

Third quarter

- NMSU – Star Thomas 17-yard pass from Diego Pavia (Ethan Albertson kick), 5:03. Aggies 17–7. Drive: 10 plays, 80 yards, 5:24.

Fourth quarter

- NMSU – Eli Stowers 2-yard pass from Diego Pavia (Ethan Albertson kick), 8:42. Aggies 24–7. Drive: 16 plays, 83 yards, 9:58.
- AUB – Alex McPherson 48-yard field goal, 5:29. Aggies 24–10. Drive: 8 plays, 53 yards, 3:10.
- NMSU – Makhilyn Young 2-yard run (Ethan Albertson kick), 1:59. Aggies 31–10. Drive: 6 plays, 43 yards, 3:28.

Statistics	NMSU	AUB
First downs	22	11
Plays–yards	65–414	45–213
Rushes–yards	37–213	26–65
Passing yards	201	148
Passing: comp–att–int	19–28–0	15–19–0
Turnovers		
Time of possession	38:50	21:10

Team	Category	Player	Statistics
New Mexico State	Passing	Diego Pavia	19/28, 201 yards, 3 TD
New Mexico State	Rushing	Star Thomas	7 carries, 67 yards
New Mexico State	Receiving	Kordell David	4 receptions, 55 yards, TD
Auburn	Passing	Payton Thorne	15/19, 148 yards, TD
Auburn	Rushing	Payton Thorne	17 carries, 38 yards
Auburn	Receiving	Caleb Burton	4 receptions, 33 yards

=== Alabama ===
Game Twelve – No. 8 Alabama Crimson Tide (10–1) at Auburn Tigers (6–5)

Quarter	1	2	3	4	Total
No. 8 Crimson Tide	7	10	3	7	27
Tigers	7	7	7	3	24

at Jordan–Hare Stadium • Auburn, Alabama

- Date: Saturday, November 25, 2023
- Game time: 2:39 p.m. CST
- Game weather: Sunny • Temperature: 64 °F (18 °C) • Wind: SE 8 mph
- Game attendance: 88,043
- Referee: Jason Autrey
- TV announcers (CBS): Brad Nessler (play-by-play), Gary Danielson (analyst), Jenny Dell (sideline reporter)

Statistics	ALA	AUB
First downs	21	18
Plays–yards	68–451	59–337
Rushes–yards	44–192	42–244
Passing yards	259	93
Passing: comp–att–int	16–24–0	6–17–2
Turnovers		
Time of possession	32:43	27:17

Team	Category	Player	Statistics
Alabama	Passing	Jalen Milroe	16/24, 259 yards, 2 TD
Alabama	Rushing	Jalen Milroe	18 carries, 107 yards
Alabama	Receiving	Jermaine Burton	4 receptions, 107 yards, TD
Auburn	Passing	Payton Thorne	5/16, 91 yards, TD, 2 INT
Auburn	Rushing	Jarquez Hunter	14 carries, 93 yards
Auburn	Receiving	Ja'varrius Johnson	4 receptions, 76 yards, TD

=== Maryland ===
Music City Bowl – Auburn Tigers (6–6) vs. Maryland Terrapins (7–5) – Game summary

Quarter	1	2	3	4	Total
Auburn	0	7	0	6	13
Maryland	21	3	7	0	31

at Nissan Stadium • Nashville, Tennessee

- Date: Saturday, December 30, 2023
- Game time: 1:00 p.m. CST
- Game weather: Cloudy • Temperature: 40 °F (4 °C) • Wind: 9 mph (14 km/h) SW
- Game attendance: 50,088
- Referee: David Alvarez
- TV announcers (ABC): Taylor Zarzour (play-by-play), Matt Stinchcomb (analyst), Alyssa Lang (sideline reporter)
- Box score

Game information

First quarter

- (13:11) MD – Billy Edwards Jr. 2 yard run, Jack Howes kick (Drive: 5 plays, 75 yards, 1:49; Maryland 7–0)
- (5:58) MD – Preston Howard 5 yard pass from Billy Edwards Jr., Jack Howes kick (Drive: 11 plays, 75 yards, 5:26; Maryland 14–0)
- (3:24) MD – Dylan Wade 3 yard pass from Cameron Edge, Jack Howes kick (Drive: 3 plays, 76 yards, 1:26; Maryland 21–0)

Second quarter

- (2:34) AUB – Brandon Frazier 3-yard pass from Payton Thorne, Alex McPherson kick (Drive: 14 plays, 80 yards, 4:56; Maryland 21–7)
- (0:08) MD – Jack Howes 49 yard field goal (Drive: 9 plays, 38 yards, 2:26; Maryland 24–7)

Third quarter

- (11:05) MD – Glendon Miller 44 yard interception return, Jack Howes kick (Drive: 4 plays, 10 yards, 1:28; Maryland 31–7)

Fourth quarter

- (6:53) AUB – Jeremiah Cobb 1 yard run, two-point pass conversion failed (Drive: 3 plays, 66 yards, 0:58; Maryland 31–13)

Statistics	AUB	UMD
First downs	20	15
Plays–yards	77–300	59–310
Rushes–yards	35–76	32–102
Passing yards	224	208
Passing: comp–att–int	21–42–2	10–26–1
Turnovers		
Time of possession	31:52	28:08

Team	Category	Player	Statistics
Auburn	Passing	Hank Brown	7/9, 132 YDS
Auburn	Rushing	Jarquez Hunter	13 Car, 44 YDS
Auburn	Receiving	Caleb Burton III	5 Rec, 78 YDS
Maryland	Passing	Billy Edwards Jr.	6/20, 126 YDS, 1 TD
Maryland	Rushing	Billy Edwards Jr.	13 Car, 50 YDS, 1 TD
Maryland	Receiving	Roman Hemby	1 Rec, 61 YDS

== Rankings ==
Ranking movements Legend: ██ Increase in ranking ██ Decrease in ranking — = Not ranked RV = Received votes
	Week															
Poll	Pre	1	2	3	4	5	6	7	8	9	10	11	12	13	14	Final
AP	RV	RV	—	RV	—	—	—	—	—	—	—					
Coaches	RV	RV	—	RV	—	—	—	—	—	—	—					
CFP	Not released									—	—					Not released
