= Rivaldo Fairweather =

American football player (born 2002)

Profile
- Position: Tight end

Personal information
- Born: July 19, 2002 (age 24); Lauderhill, Florida, U.S.
- Listed height: 6 ft 3 in (1.91 m)
- Listed weight: 249 lb (113 kg)

Career information
- High school: Boyd Anderson (Lauderdale Lakes, Florida)
- College: FIU (2020–2022); Auburn (2023–2024)
- NFL draft: 2025: undrafted

Career history
- Dallas Cowboys (2025)*; Arizona Cardinals (2025–2026)
- * Offseason or practice squad member only

Awards and highlights
- Second-team All-SEC (2023)
- Stats at Pro Football Reference

Rivaldo Fairweather (born July 19, 2002) is an American professional football tight end. He played college football for the FIU Panthers and Auburn Tigers.

== Early life ==
Fairweather attended Boyd H. Anderson High School in Lauderdale Lakes, Florida. As a senior, Fairweather recorded 40 receptions for 812 yards and 15 touchdowns, while also contributing 23 tackles on defense. A three-star recruit, he committed to play college football at Florida International University.

== College career ==
Fairweather played three seasons at FIU, tallying 54 receptions for 838 yards and five touchdowns, before electing to enter the transfer portal. He had a breakout season during his redshirt sophomore season, including tying the program record for most receiving touchdowns in a game, with three.

On December 18, 2022, Fairweather announced that he would be transferring to Auburn University. In his first career game with Auburn, Fairweather scored the go-ahead touchdown, a five-yard pass from Payton Thorne, that led to a 14–10 victory over Cal. The following week, he caught of all his five targets for 57 yards against Samford. Fairweather finished the season with 33 receptions for 349 yards and six touchdowns before announcing that he would be returning to Auburn the following season.

=== Statistics ===
Year	Team	Games	Receiving			
Year	Team	GP	Rec	Yards	Avg	TD
2020	FIU	5	10	165	16.5	1
2021	FIU	9	16	247	15.4	1
2022	FIU	12	28	426	15.2	3
2023	Auburn	13	38	394	10.4	6
2024	Auburn	9	24	267	11.1	2
Career		48	116	1,499	12.9	13

== Professional career ==
Pre-draft measurables
Height	Weight	Arm length	Hand span	Wingspan	40-yard dash	10-yard split	20-yard split	20-yard shuttle	Three-cone drill	Vertical jump	Broad jump	Bench press
6 ft 3 3/8 in (1.91 m)	242 lb (110 kg)	34 1/4 in (0.87 m)	9 5/8 in (0.24 m)	6 ft 11 5/8 in (2.12 m)	4.72 s	1.63 s	2.71 s	4.40 s	7.10 s	30.0 in (0.76 m)	9 ft 2 in (2.79 m)	17 reps
All values from Pro Day

=== Dallas Cowboys ===
Fairweather signed with the Dallas Cowboys as an undrafted free agent on May 2, 2025. He was waived on August 26 as part of final roster cuts and re-signed to the practice squad the next day.

=== Arizona Cardinals ===
On December 30, 2025, Fairweather was signed by the Arizona Cardinals off of the Cowboys' practice squad.

On August 30, 2026, Fairweather was waived by the Cardinals as a part of final roster cuts. He was re-signed to the practice squad on November 3. On November 10, Fairweather was released.
