= 2024 Auburn Tigers football team =

American college football season

2024 Auburn Tigers football
- Conference: Southeastern Conference
- Record: 5–7 (2–6 SEC)
- Head coach: Hugh Freeze (2nd season)
- Offensive coordinator: Derrick Nix (1st season)
- Offensive scheme: Multiple
- Defensive coordinator: D. J. Durkin (1st season)
- Co-defensive coordinator: Charles Kelly (1st season)
- Base defense: 4–3
- Home stadium: Jordan–Hare Stadium

2024 Southeastern Conference football standings
	Conf.			Overall
Team	W		L	W		L
No. 4 Texas y^	7	–	1	13	–	3
No. 6 Georgia y$^	6	–	2	11	–	3
No. 9 Tennessee ^	6	–	2	10	–	3
No. 22 Missouri	5	–	3	10	–	3
No. 11 Ole Miss	5	–	3	10	–	3
No. 17 Alabama	5	–	3	9	–	4
No. 19 South Carolina	5	–	3	9	–	4
LSU	5	–	3	9	–	4
Texas A&M	5	–	3	8	–	5
Florida	4	–	4	8	–	5
Arkansas	3	–	5	7	–	6
Vanderbilt	3	–	5	7	–	6
Oklahoma	2	–	6	6	–	7
Auburn	2	–	6	5	–	7
Kentucky	1	–	7	4	–	8
Mississippi State	0	–	8	2	–	10
Championship: Georgia 22, Texas 19 ^{OT}
^ – College Football Playoff participant; $ – Conference champion; y – Championship game participant; Rankings from AP Poll

The 2024 Auburn Tigers football team represented Auburn University as member of the Southeastern Conference (SEC) during the 2024 NCAA Division I FBS football season. Led by second-year head coach Hugh Freeze, the Tigers compiled an overall record of 5–7 with a mark of 2–6 in conference play, tying for 13th place in the SEC. The team played home games at Jordan–Hare Stadium located in Auburn, Alabama.

== Schedule ==
Auburn and the SEC announced the 2024 football schedule on December 13, 2023.

Date	Time	Opponent	Site	TV	Result	Attendance
August 31	6:30 p.m.	Alabama A&M*	Jordan–Hare Stadium; Auburn, AL	ESPN+, SECN+	W 73–3	88,043
September 7	2:30 p.m.	California*	Jordan–Hare Stadium; Auburn, AL	ESPN2	L 14–21	88,043
September 14	6:30 p.m.	New Mexico*	Jordan–Hare Stadium; Auburn, AL	ESPN2	W 45–19	88,043
September 21	2:30 p.m.	Arkansas	Jordan–Hare Stadium; Auburn, AL	ESPN	L 14–24	88,043
September 28	2:30 p.m.	No. 21 Oklahoma	Jordan–Hare Stadium; Auburn, AL (SEC Nation)	ABC	L 21–27	88,043
October 5	2:30 p.m.	at No. 5 Georgia	Sanford Stadium; Athens, GA (Deep South's Oldest Rivalry)	ABC	L 13–31	93,033
October 19	11:00 a.m.	at No. 19 Missouri	Faurot Field; Columbia, MO	ESPN	L 17–21	62,621
October 26	6:45 p.m.	at Kentucky	Kroger Field; Lexington, KY	SECN	W 24–10	60,605
November 2	11:45 a.m.	Vanderbilt	Jordan–Hare Stadium; Auburn, AL	SECN	L 7–17	88,043
November 16	11:45 a.m.	Louisiana–Monroe*	Jordan–Hare Stadium; Auburn, AL	SECN	W 48–14	88,043
November 23	6:30 p.m.	No. 15 Texas A&M	Jordan–Hare Stadium; Auburn, AL	ESPN	W 43–41 ^{4OT}	88,043
November 30	2:30 p.m.	at No. 13 Alabama	Bryant–Denny Stadium; Tuscaloosa, AL (Iron Bowl, SEC Nation)	ABC	L 14–28	100,077
*Non-conference game; Rankings from AP Poll (and CFP Rankings, after October 31) – Released prior to game; All times are in Central time

== Game summaries ==
=== vs. Alabama A&M ===
Game One – Alabama A&M Bulldogs (FCS) (0–0) at Auburn Tigers (0–0) – Game summary

Quarter	1	2	3	4	Total
Bulldogs (FCS)	0	3	0	0	3
Tigers	28	24	14	7	73

at Jordan–Hare Stadium • Auburn, Alabama

- Date: August 31, 2024
- Game time: 6:32 p.m. CDT
- Game weather: Sunny
- Game attendance: 88,043
- Referee: Ken Williamson
- TV announcers (ESPN+/SEC Network+): Lowell Galindo (play-by-play) and Fozzy Whittaker (analyst)
- Box Score

Game information
First quarter
- AUB – Jarquez Hunter 34-yard run (Towns McGough kick), 14:13. Auburn 7–0. Drive: 4 plays, 70 yards, 0:47.
- AUB – KeAndre Lambert-Smith 67-yard pass from Payton Thorne (Towns McGough kick), 12:47. Auburn 14–0. Drive: 1 play, 67 yards, 0:12.
- AUB – Cam Coleman 44-yard pass from Payton Thorne (Towns McGough kick), 11:39. Auburn 21–0. Drive: 1 play, 44 yards, 0:07.
- AUB – KeAndre Lambert-Smith 4-yard pass from Payton Thorne (Towns McGough kick), 2:00. Auburn 28–0. Drive: 6 plays, 65 yards, 2:18.

Second quarter

- AUB – Towns McGough 32-yard field goal, 13:48. Auburn 31–0. Drive: 4 plays, 7 yards, 0:59.
- AUB – Perry Thompson 70-yard pass from Payton Thorne (Towns McGough kick), 10:10. Auburn 38–0. Drive: 2 plays, 82 yards, 0:34.
- AA&M – Austin McCready 43-yard field goal, 6:00. Auburn 38–3. Drive: 11 plays, 57 yards, 4:03.
- AUB – Payton Thorne 4-yard run (Towns McGough kick), 3:22. Auburn 45–3. Drive: 6 plays, 75 yards, 2:31.
- AUB – Damari Alston 2-yard run (Towns McGough kick), 0:51. Auburn 52–3. Drive: 6 plays, 47 yards, 1:05.

Third quarter

- AUB – Malcolm Simmons blocked punt recovery (Towns McGough kick), 8:25. Auburn 59–3.
- AUB – Malcolm Simmons 57-yard pass from Hank Brown (Towns McGough kick), 1:40. Auburn 66–3. Drive: 5 plays, 80 yards, 1:32.

Fourth quarter

- AUB – Sam Jackson V 37-yard pass from Hank Brown (Towns McGough kick), 9:09. Auburn 73–3. Drive: 3 plays, 42 yards, 0:51.

Statistics	AAMU	AUB
First downs	13	18
Total yards	70–242	46–628
Rushing yards	36–38	18–177
Passing yards	204	451
Passing: Comp–Att–Int	16–34–0	18–28–0
Time of possession	41:33	18:27

Team	Category	Player	Statistics
Alabama A&M	Passing	Cornelious Brown	13/27, 182 yds
Alabama A&M	Rushing	Ryan Morrow	5 rushes, 18 yds
Alabama A&M	Receiving	Duke Miller	6 receptions, 92 yds
Auburn	Passing	Payton Thorne	13/21, 322 yds, 4 TD
Auburn	Rushing	Jarquez Hunter	4 rushes, 53 yds, TD
Auburn	Receiving	Malcolm Simmons	3 receptions, 91 yds, TD

=== vs. California ===
Game Two – California Golden Bears (1–0) vs Auburn Tigers (1–0) – Game summary

Quarter	1	2	3	4	Total
Golden Bears	7	7	0	7	21
Tigers	7	0	0	7	14

at Jordan–Hare Stadium • Auburn, Alabama

- Date: September 7, 2024
- Game time: 2:35 p.m. CDT
- Game weather: Sunny • Temperature: 85 °F (29 °C) • Wind: NW 4 mph
- Game attendance: 88,043
- Referee: Riley Johnson
- TV announcers (ESPN2): Dave Flemming (play-by-play), Brock Osweiler (analyst), and Stormy Buonantony (sideline reporter)
- Box Score

Game information
First quarter
- AUB – KeAndre Lambert-Smith 15-yard pass from Payton Thorne (Towns McGough kick), 11:42. Auburn 7–0. Drive: 8 plays, 75 yards, 3:18.
- CAL – Nyziah Hunter 19-yard pass from Fernando Mendoza (Ryan Coe kick), 7:17. Tied 7–7. Drive: 8 plays, 75 yards, 4:25.

Second quarter

- CAL – Nyziah Hunter 13-yard pass from Fernando Mendoza (Ryan Coe kick), 10:39. California 14–7. Drive: 3 plays, 21 yards, 1:30.

Third quarter

- No scoring plays.

Fourth quarter

- CAL – Jaivian Thomas 32-yard run (Ryan Coe kick), 11:27. California 21–7. Drive: 2 plays, 36 yards, 0:49.
- AUB – Payton Thorne 2-yard run (Towns McGough kick), 6:06. California 21–14. Drive: 12 plays, 75 yards, 5:21.

Statistics	CAL	AUB
First downs	18	15
Total yards	70–332	57–286
Rushing yards	34–99	30–121
Passing yards	233	165
Passing: Comp–Att–Int	25–36–0	14–27–4
Time of possession	35:16	24:44

Team	Category	Player	Statistics
California	Passing	Fernando Mendoza	25/36, 233 yds, 2 TD
California	Rushing	Jaivian Thomas	8 rushes, 53 yds, TD
California	Receiving	Jonathan Brady	4 receptions, 63 yds
Auburn	Passing	Payton Thorne	14/27, 165 yds, TD, 4 INT
Auburn	Rushing	Jarquez Hunter	12 rushes, 68 yds
Auburn	Receiving	Jarquez Hunter	3 receptions, 11 yds

=== vs. New Mexico ===
Game Three – New Mexico Lobos (0–2) vs Auburn Tigers (1–1) – Game summary

Quarter	1	2	3	4	Total
Lobos	10	3	0	6	19
Tigers	14	3	14	14	45

at Jordan–Hare Stadium • Auburn, Alabama

- Date: September 14, 2024
- Game time: 6:35 p.m. CDT
- Game weather: Rain • Temperature: 74 °F (23 °C) • Wind: E 6 mph
- Game attendance: 88,043
- Referee: Lee Hedrick
- TV announcers (ESPN2): Roy Philpott (play-by-play), Sam Acho (analyst), and Taylor Davis (sideline reporter)
- Box Score

Game information

First quarter

- UNM – Luke Drzewiecki 33-yard field goal, 11:12. New Mexico 3–0. Drive: 9 plays, 60 yards, 3:48.
- AUB – Camden Brown 10-yard pass from Hank Brown (Towns McGough kick), 7:45. Auburn 7–0. Drive: 9 plays, 32 yards, 3:18.
- UNM – NaQuari Rogers 3-yard rush (Luke Drzewiecki kick), 4:14. New Mexico 10–7. Drive: 10 plays, 75 yards, 3:31.
- AUB – Jarquez Hunter 2-yard rush (Towns McGough kick), 1:12. Auburn 14–10. Drive: 7 plays, 75 yards, 3:02.

Second quarter

- AUB – Towns McGough 24-yard field goal, 13:34. Auburn 17–10. Drive: 5 plays, 27 yards, 1:51.
- UNM – Luke Drzewiecki 21-yard field goal, 10:01. Auburn 17–13. Drive: 11 plays, 71 yards, 3:33.

Third quarter

- AUB – Micah Riley 3-yard pass from Hank Brown (Towns McGough kick), 9:58. Auburn 24–13. Drive: 10 plays, 75 yards, 5:02.
- AUB – Jarquez Hunter 14-yard pass from Hank Brown (Towns McGough kick), 4:55. Auburn 31–13. Drive: 2 plays, 51 yards, 0:38.

Fourth quarter

- UNM – Caleb Medford 4-yard pass from Devon Dampier (pass failed), 13:50. Auburn 31–19. Drive: 12 plays, 74 yards, 5:54.
- AUB – Rivaldo Fairweather 26-yard pass from Hank Brown (Towns McGough kick), 12:08. Auburn 38–19. Drive: 4 plays, 43 yards, 1:32.
- AUB – Damari Alston 22-yard rush (Towns McGough kick), 5:51. Auburn 45–19. Drive: 6 plays, 70 yards, 2:15.

Statistics	UNM	AUB
First downs	22	26
Total yards	448	503
Rushing yards	157	268
Passing yards	291	235
Turnovers	2	2
Time of possession	32:31	27:29

Team	Category	Player	Statistics
New Mexico	Passing	Devon Dampier	22/44, 291 yards, TD, 2 INT
New Mexico	Rushing	Eli Sanders	7 rushes, 72 yards
New Mexico	Receiving	Ryan Davis	6 receptions, 100 yards
Auburn	Passing	Hank Brown	17/25, 235 yards, 4 TD
Auburn	Rushing	Jarquez Hunter	20 rushes, 152 yards, TD
Auburn	Receiving	Camden Brown	4 receptions, 33 yards, TD

=== vs. Arkansas ===
Game Four – Arkansas Razorbacks (2–1) vs Auburn Tigers (2–1) – Game summary

Quarter	1	2	3	4	Total
Razorbacks	0	7	7	10	24
Tigers	0	0	7	7	14

at Jordan–Hare Stadium • Auburn, Alabama

- Date: September 21, 2024
- Game time: 2:35 p.m. CDT
- Game weather: Sunny • Temperature: 89 °F (32 °C) • Wind: E 2 mph
- Game attendance: 88,043
- Referee: Ken Williamson
- TV announcers (ESPN): Mark Jones (play-by-play), Roddy Jones (analyst), and Quint Kessenich (sideline reporter)
- Box Score

Game information
First quarter
- No scoring plays.

Second quarter

- ARK – Ja'Quinden Jackson 1-yard rush (Kyle Ramsey kick), 14:49. Arkansas 7–0. Drive: 15 plays, 81 yards, 7:05.

Third quarter

- AUB – KeAndre Lambert-Smith 10-yard pass from Payton Thorne (Towns McGough kick), 5:44. Tied 7–7. Drive: 6 plays, 77 yards, 2:48.
- ARK – Isaiah Sategna 58-yard pass from Taylen Green (Kyle Ramsey kick), 2:03. Arkansas 14–7. Drive: 9 plays, 75 yards, 3:41.

Fourth quarter

- ARK – Kyle Ramsey 39-yard field goal, 12:04. Arkansas 17–7. Drive: 8 plays, 20 yards, 3:01.
- AUB – KeAndre Lambert-Smith 67-yard pass from Payton Thorne (Towns McGough kick), 9:50. Arkansas 17–14. Drive: 4 plays, 75 yards, 2:07.
- ARK – Ja'Quinden Jackson 1-yard rush (Kyle Ramsey kick), 3:38. Arkansas 24–14. Drive: 12 plays, 75 yards, 6:12.

Statistics	ARK	AUB
First downs	21	17
Total yards	83–334	61–431
Rushing yards	183	146
Passing yards	151	285
Passing: Comp–Att–Int	12–28–2	20–35–4
Time of possession	36:36	23:24

Team	Category	Player	Statistics
Arkansas	Passing	Taylen Green	12/27, 151 yds, TD, 2 INT
Arkansas	Rushing	Taylen Green	18 rushes, 80 yds
Arkansas	Receiving	Isaiah Sategna	3 receptions, 85 yds, TD
Auburn	Passing	Payton Thorne	13/22, 213 yds, 2 TD, INT
Auburn	Rushing	Jarquez Hunter	12 rushes, 67 yds
Auburn	Receiving	KeAndre Lambert-Smith	5 receptions, 156 yds, 2 TD

=== vs No. 21 Oklahoma ===
Game Five – No. 21 Oklahoma Sooners (3–1) vs Auburn Tigers (2–2) – Game summary

Quarter	1	2	3	4	Total
No. 21 Sooners	7	0	3	17	27
Tigers	0	14	0	7	21

at Jordan–Hare Stadium • Auburn, Alabama

- Date: September 28, 2024
- Game time: 2:45 p.m. CDT
- Game weather: Cloudy • Temperature: 79 °F (26 °C) • Wind: SW 10 miles per hour (16 km/h)
- Game attendance: 88,043
- Referee: Jason Autrey
- TV announcers (ABC): Joe Tessitore (play-by-play), Jordan Rodgers (analyst), and Katie George (sideline reporter)
- Box Score

Game information
First quarter
- OU – Michael Hawkins Jr. 48-yard rush (Zach Schmit kick), 12:30 Drive: 4 plays, 68 yards, 1:20. Oklahoma 7–0.

Second quarter

- AUB – KeAndre Lambert-Smith 31-yard pass from Payton Thorne (Towns McGough kick), 12:52. Drive: 4 plays, 72 yards, 2:02. Tied 7–7.
- AUB – Malcom Simmons 48-yard pass from Payton Thorne (Towns McGough kick), 5:41. Drive: 7 plays, 81 yards, 3:58. Auburn 14–7.

Third quarter

- OU – Zach Schmit 24-yard field goal, 2:26. Drive: 11 plays, 51 yards, 6:34. Auburn 14–10.

Fourth quarter

- AUB – Luke Deal 1-yard pass from Payton Thorne (Towns McGough kick), 14:12. Drive: 7 plays, 58 yards, 3:06. Auburn 21–10.
- OU – Jovantae Barnes 2-yard run, 8:32. Drive: 4 plays, 67 yards, 1:40. Auburn 21–16.
- OU – Kip Lewis 63-yard interception (Michael Hawkins Jr. rush), 4:06. Oklahoma 24–21.
- OU – Zach Schmit 39-yard field goal, 0:54. Drive: 4 plays, 3 yards, 1:00. Oklahoma 27–21.

Statistics	OU	AUB
First downs	11	26
Total yards	47–291	75–482
Rushing yards	32–130	43–144
Passing yards	161	338
Passing: Comp–Att–Int	10–15–0	21–32–1
Time of possession	24:34	35:26

Team	Category	Player	Statistics
Oklahoma	Passing	Michael Hawkins Jr.	10/15, 161 yds
Oklahoma	Rushing	Michael Hawkins Jr.	14 rushes, 69 yds, TD
Oklahoma	Receiving	J.J. Hester	3 receptions, 86 yds
Auburn	Passing	Payton Thorne	21/32, 338 yds, 3 TD, INT
Auburn	Rushing	Jarquez Hunter	17 rushes, 97 yds
Auburn	Receiving	Cam Coleman	3 receptions, 82 yds

=== at No. 5 Georgia ===
Game Six – Auburn Tigers (2–3) at No. 5 Georgia Bulldogs (3–1) – Game summary

Quarter	1	2	3	4	Total
Tigers	3	0	7	3	13
No. 5 Bulldogs	7	7	7	10	31

at Sanford Stadium • Athens, Georgia

- Date: October 5, 2024
- Game time: 2:45 p.m. CDT
- Game weather: Sunny • Temperature: 82 °F (28 °C) • Wind: NE 7 miles per hour (11 km/h)
- Game attendance: 93,033
- Referee: Steve Marlowe
- TV announcers (ABC): Sean McDonough (play-by-play), Greg McElroy (analyst), and Molly McGrath (sideline reporter)
- Box Score

Game information
First quarter
- UGA – Trevor Etienne 2-yard run (Peyton Woodring kick), 6:24. Georgia 7–0. Drive: 11 plays, 75 yards, 4:58.
- AUB – Towns McGough 27-yard field goal, 0:56. Georgia 7–3. Drive: 10 plays, 62 yards, 5:21.

Second quarter

- UGA – Dominic Lovett 11-yard pass from Carson Beck (Peyton Woodring kick), 0:17. Georgia 14–3. Drive: 5 plays, 49 yards, 0:45.

Third quarter

- AUB – Jarquez Hunter 38-yard run (Towns McGough kick), 9:45. Georgia 14–10. Drive: 6 plays, 68 yards, 3:45.
- UGA – Trevor Etienne 1-yard run (Peyton Woodring kick), 3:50. Georgia 21–10. Drive: 12 plays, 75 yards, 5:55.

Fourth quarter

- UGA – Dillon Bell 3-yard pass from Carson Beck (Peyton Woodring kick), 12:34. Georgia 28–10. Drive: 5 plays, 40 yards, 2:20.
- AUB – Towns McGough 26-yard field goal, 7:38. Georgia 28–13. Drive: 12 plays, 67 yards, 4:51.
- UGA – Peyton Woodring 47-yard field goal, 1:50. Georgia 31–13. Drive: 12 plays, 46 yards, 5:48.

Statistics	AUB	UGA
First downs	18	21
Total yards	58–337	66–381
Rushing yards	31–137	37–141
Passing yards	200	240
Passing: Comp–Att–Int	16–27–0	23–29–0
Time of possession	28:32	31:28

Team	Category	Player	Statistics
Auburn	Passing	Payton Thorne	16/27, 200 yds
Auburn	Rushing	Jarquez Hunter	13 rushes, 91 yds, TD
Auburn	Receiving	KeAndre Lambert-Smith	7 receptions, 95 yds
Georgia	Passing	Carson Beck	23/29, 240 yds, 2 TD
Georgia	Rushing	Trevor Etienne	16 rushes, 88 yds, 2 TD
Georgia	Receiving	Colbie Young	3 receptions, 51 yds

=== at No. 19 Missouri ===
Game Seven – Auburn Tigers (2–4) at No. 19 Missouri Tigers (4–1) – Game summary

Quarter	1	2	3	4	Total
Auburn	0	3	14	0	17
No. 19 Missouri	3	0	3	15	21

at Faurot Field • Columbia, Missouri

- Date: October 19, 2024
- Game time: 11:07 a.m. CDT
- Game weather: Sunny • Temperature: 62 °F (17 °C) • Wind: S 6 miles per hour (9.7 km/h)
- Game attendance: 62,621
- Referee: David Smith
- TV announcers (ESPN): Dave Pasch (play-by-play), Dusty Dvoracek (analyst), and Taylor McGregor (sideline reporter)
- Box Score

Game information

First quarter

- (8:24) MIZ – Blake Craig 51 yard field goal (Drive: 12 plays, 41 yards, 6:36; Missouri 3–0)

Second quarter

- (11:12) AUB – Towns McGough 32 yard field goal (Drive: 11 plays, 64 yards, 5:45; Tied 3–3)

Third quarter

- (12:34) AUB – Cam Coleman 47 yard pass from Payton Thorne (Towns McGough Kick) (Drive: 6 plays, 75 yards, 2:26; Auburn 10–3)
- (11:08) AUB – Antonio Kite 0 yard fumble return (Towns McGough Kick) (Auburn 17–3)
- (7:44) MIZ – Blake Craig 38 yard field goal (Drive: 9 plays, 44 yards, 3:24; Auburn 17–6)

Fourth quarter

- (14:57) MIZ – Marcus Carroll 2 yard run (Brady Cook run for 2 point conversion) (Drive: 4 plays, 80 yards, 0:34; Auburn 17–14)
- (0:46) MIZ – Jamal Roberts 4 yard run (Blake Craig Kick) (Drive: 17 plays, 95 yards, 3:40; Missouri 21–17)

Statistics	AUB	MIZZ
First downs	17	10
Total yards	64–286	75–353
Rushing yards	35–110	32–81
Passing yards	176	272
Passing: Comp–Att–Int	17–29–0	21–43–0
Time of possession	32:27	27:33

Team	Category	Player	Statistics
Auburn	Passing	Payton Thorne	17/29, 176 yards, TD
Auburn	Rushing	Jarquez Hunter	19 carries, 57 yards
Auburn	Receiving	Cam Coleman	1 reception, 47 yards, TD
Missouri	Passing	Brady Cook	11/22, 194 yards
Missouri	Rushing	Marcus Carroll	8 carries, 40 yards, TD
Missouri	Receiving	Mookie Cooper	2 receptions, 84 yards

=== at Kentucky ===
Auburn Tigers (2–5) at Kentucky Wildcats (3–4) – Game summary

Quarter	1	2	3	4	Total
Tigers	0	10	7	7	24
Wildcats	10	0	0	0	10

at Kroger Field • Lexington, Kentucky

- Date: October 26, 2024
- Game time: 6:55 p.m. CDT
- Game weather: Clear • Temperature: 57 °F (14 °C) • Wind: NE 7 mph
- Game attendance: 60,605
- Referee: Steve Marlowe
- TV announcers (SEC Network): Taylor Zarzour (play-by-play), Matt Stinchcomb (analyst) and Ashley Stroehlein (sideline reporter)
- Box Score

Game information

First Quarter

- UK – Alex Raynor 46-yard field goal, 11:28. Kentucky 3–0. Drive: 7 plays, 47 yards, 3:32.
- UK – Jamarion Wilcox 2-yard run, 8:24. Kentucky 10–0. Drive: 7 plays, 53 yards, 1:49.

Second Quarter

- AUB – KeAndre Lambert-Smith 6-yard pass from Payton Thorne (Alex McPherson kick), 10:56. Kentucky 10–7. Drive: 5 plays, 53 yards, 2:32.
- AUB – Alex McPherson 27-yard field goal, 3:57. Tied 10–10. Drive: 8 plays, 54 yards, 5:09.

Third Quarter

- AUB – Jarquez Hunter 1-yard run (Alex McPherson kick), 7:53. Auburn 17–10. Drive: 14 plays, 75 yards, 7:07.

Fourth Quarter

- AUB – Jarquez Hunter 45-yard run (Alex McPherson kick), 12:11. Auburn 24–10. Drive: 9 plays, 80 yards, 4:45.

Statistics	AUB	UK
First downs	27	13
Total yards	76–498	54–224
Rushing yards	50–326	27–70
Passing yards	172	154
Passing: Comp–Att–Int	20–26–1	12–27–2
Time of possession	35:42	24:18

Team	Category	Player	Statistics
Auburn	Passing	Payton Thorne	20/26, 172 yards, TD, INT
Auburn	Rushing	Jarquez Hunter	23 rushes, 278 yards, 2 TD
Auburn	Receiving	KeAndre Lambert-Smith	4 receptions, 53 yards, TD
Kentucky	Passing	Brock Vandagriff	9/17, 120 yards, INT
Kentucky	Rushing	Jason Patterson	6 rushes, 38 yards
Kentucky	Receiving	Dane Key	4 receptions, 87 yards

=== vs Vanderbilt ===
Vanderbilt Commodores (5–3) vs Auburn Tigers (3–5) – Game summary

Quarter	1	2	3	4	Total
Commodores	7	0	3	7	17
Tigers	0	7	0	0	7

at Jordan–Hare Stadium • Auburn, Alabama

- Date: November 2, 2024
- Game time: 11:45 a.m. CDT
- Game weather: Sunny • Temperature: 75 °F (24 °C) • Wind: E 5 miles per hour (8.0 km/h)
- Game attendance: 88,043
- Referee: Kyle Olson
- TV announcers (SEC Network): Taylor Zarzour (play-by-play), Matt Stinchcomb (analyst) and Ashley Stroehlein (sideline reporter)
- Box Score

Game information

First quarter

- VAN – A. J. Newberry 28-yard pass from Diego Pavia (Brock Taylor kick), 0:50. Commodores 7–0. Drive: 6 plays, 81 yards, 3:01.

Second quarter

- AUB – Rivaldo Fairweather 30-yard pass from Payton Thorne (Towns McGough kick), 6:45. Tied 7–7. Drive: 11 plays, 80 yards, 5:30.

Third quarter

- VAN – Brock Taylor 31-yard field goal, 1:05. Commodores 10–7. Drive: 4 plays, 8 yards, 1:20.

Fourth quarter

- VAN – Eli Stowers 4-yard pass from Diego Pavia (Brock Taylor kick), 4:18. Commodores 17–7. Drive: 14 plays, 78 yards, 8:53.

Statistics	VAN	AUB
First downs	12	14
Total yards	227	327
Rushing yards	84	88
Passing yards	143	239
Passing: Comp–Att–Int	9–23–0	20–29–0
Time of possession	31:57	28:03

Team	Category	Player	Statistics
Vanderbilt	Passing	Diego Pavia	9/22, 143 yards, 2 TD
Vanderbilt	Rushing	Sedrick Alexander	10 carries, 28 yards
Vanderbilt	Receiving	Junior Sherrill	1 reception, 31 yards
Auburn	Passing	Payton Thorne	20/29, 239 yards, TD
Auburn	Rushing	Jarquez Hunter	12 carries, 50 yards
Auburn	Receiving	KeAndre Lambert-Smith	4 receptions, 78 yards

=== vs Louisiana–Monroe ===
Louisiana–Monroe Warhawks (5–4) vs Auburn Tigers (3–6) – Game summary

Quarter	1	2	3	4	Total
Warhawks	0	0	7	7	14
Tigers	10	14	14	10	48

at Jordan–Hare Stadium • Auburn, Alabama

- Date: November 16, 2024
- Game time: 11:45 a.m. CST
- Game weather: Sunny • Temperature: 61 °F (16 °C) • Wind: S 5 miles per hour (8.0 km/h)
- Game attendance: 88,043
- Referee: Wayne Winkler
- TV announcers (SEC Network): Taylor Zarzour (play-by-play), Matt Stinchcomb (analyst) and Alyssa Lang (sideline)

Game information

First quarter

- (10:57) AUB – Cam Coleman 20-yard pass from Payton Thorne, Ian Vachon kick (Drive: 8 plays, 60 yards, 2:24; Auburn 7–0)
- (5:21) AUB – Ian Vachon 22-yard field goal (Drive: 8 plays, 50 yards, 2:43; Auburn 10–0)

Second quarter

- (7:44) AUB – Cam Coleman 3-yard pass from Payton Thorne, Ian Vachon kick (Drive: 16 plays, 99 yards, 7:34; Auburn 17–0)
- (0:06) AUB – KeAndre Lambert-Smith 30-yard pass from Payton Thorne, Ian Vachon kick (Drive: 6 plays, 74 yards, 1:19; Auburn 24–0)

Third quarter

- (8:09) ULM – Ahmad Hardy 1-yard run, Max Larson kick (Drive: 8 plays, 76 yards, 5:02; Auburn 24–7)
- (4:37) AUB – Cam Coleman 22-yard pass from Payton Thorne, Ian Vachon kick (Drive: 10 plays, 70 yards, 3:25; Auburn 31–7)
- (1:16) AUB – Malcolm Simmons 40-yard pass from Payton Thorne, Ian Vachon kick (Drive: 3 plays, 62 yards, 1:18; Auburn 38–7)

Fourth quarter

- (11:48) AUB – Damari Alston 7-yard run, Ian Vachon kick (Drive: 3 plays, 12 yards, 0:46; Auburn 45–7)
- (1:48) AUB – Ian Vachon 26-yard field goal (Drive: 12 plays, 56 yards, 6:59; Auburn 48–7)
- (0:08) ULM – Jonathan Bibbs 65-yard pass from General Booty, Max Larson kick (Drive: 3 plays, 75 yards, 1:39; Auburn 48–14)

Statistics	ULM	AUB
First downs	9	26
Total yards	218	507
Rushing yards	64	203
Passing yards	154	304
Passing: Comp–Att–Int	9–16–0	24–37–0
Time of possession	29:17	30:43

Team	Category	Player	Statistics
Louisiana-Monroe	Passing	Aiden Armenta	8/15, 89 yards
Louisiana-Monroe	Rushing	Ahmad Hardy	15 carries, 60 yards, TD
Louisiana-Monroe	Receiving	Jonathan Bibbs	1 reception, 65 yards, TD
Auburn	Passing	Payton Thorne	22/32, 286 yards, 5 TD
Auburn	Rushing	Jarquez Hunter	14 carries, 102 yards
Auburn	Receiving	KeAndre Lambert-Smith	6 receptions, 102 yards

=== vs No. 15 Texas A&M ===
No. 15 Texas A&M Aggies (8–2) vs Auburn Tigers (4–6) – Game summary

Quarter	1	2	3	4	OT	2OT	3OT	4OT	Total
No. 15 Aggies	0	7	14	10	7	3	0	0	41
Tigers	14	7	7	3	7	3	0	2	43

at Jordan–Hare Stadium • Auburn, Alabama

- Date: November 23, 2024
- Game time: 6:35 p.m. CST
- Game weather: Clear • Temperature: 50 °F (10 °C) • Wind: NW 4 miles per hour (6.4 km/h)
- Game attendance: 88,043
- Referee: Jason Autrey
- TV announcers (ESPN): Dave Flemming (play-by-play), Louis Riddick (analyst), and Kris Budden (sideline)
- Box Score

Game information
First quarter
- AUB – Jarquez Hunter 2-yard run (Ian Vachon kick), 11:22. Auburn 7–0. Drive: 10 plays, 65 yards, 3:33.
- AUB – Cam Coleman 63-yard pass from Payton Thorne (Ian Vachon kick), 6:05. Auburn 14–0. Drive: 2 plays, 64 yards, 0:38.

Second quarter

- AUB – Cam Coleman 15-yard pass from Payton Thorne (Ian Vachon kick), 13:09. Auburn 21–0. Drive: 6 plays, 88 yards, 2:59.
- TAMU – Terry Bussey 1-yard run (Randy Bond kick), 4:13. Auburn 21–7. Drive: 15 plays, 75 yards, 8:56.

Third quarter

- TAMU – Noah Thomas 14-yard pass from Marcel Reed (Randy Bond kick), 9:25. Auburn 21–14. Drive: 10 plays, 76 yards, 5:30.
- TAMU – Noah Thomas 73-yard pass from Marcel Reed (Randy Bond kick), 7:57. Tied 21–21. Drive: 1 play, 73 yards, 0:10.
- AUB – Jarquez Hunter 1-yard run (Ian Vachon kick), 2:27. Auburn 28–21. Drive: 4 plays, 55 yards, 1:36.

Fourth quarter

- TAMU – Randy Bond 32-yard field goal, 12:47. Auburn 28–24. Drive: 4 plays, yards, 1:29.
- TAMU – Amari Daniels 8-yard run (Randy Bond kick), 4:01. Texas A&M 31–28. Drive: 9 plays, 80 yards, 3:58.
- AUB – Ian Vachon 29-yard field goal, 0:05. Tied 31–31. Drive: 15 plays, 74 yards, 2:28.

First overtime

- TAMU – Jahdae Walker 12-yard pass from Marcel Reed (Randy Bond kick). Texas A&M 38–31. Drive: 5 plays, 25 yards.
- AUB – Jarquez Hunter 2-yard run (Ian Vachon kick). Tied 38–38. Drive: 4 plays, 25 yards.

Second overtime

- AUB – Ian Vachon 41-yard field goal. Auburn 41–38. Drive: 5 plays, 2 yards.
- TAMU – Randy Bond 42-yard field goal. Tied 41–41. Drive: 4 plays, 1 yard.

Third overtime

- No scoring plays

Fourth overtime

- AUB – KeAndre Lambert-Smith 2-point pass reception from Payton Thorne good. Auburn 43–41.

Statistics	TAMU	AUB
First downs	27	22
Total yards	464	469
Rushing yards	167	168
Passing yards	297	301
Passing: Comp–Att–Int	22–35–1	19–31–1
Time of possession	36:30	23:25

Team	Category	Player	Statistics
Texas A&M	Passing	Marcel Reed	22/35, 297 yards, 3 TD, INT
Texas A&M	Rushing	Amari Daniels	27 rushes, 90 yards, TD
Texas A&M	Receiving	Jahdae Walker	7 receptions, 69 yards, TD
Auburn	Passing	Payton Thorne	19/31, 301 yards, 2 TD, INT
Auburn	Rushing	Jarquez Hunter	28 rushes, 130 yards, 3 TD
Auburn	Receiving	Cam Coleman	7 receptions, 128 yards, 2 TD

=== at No. 13 Alabama ===
Auburn Tigers (5–6) at No. 13 Alabama Crimson Tide (8–3) – Game summary

Quarter	1	2	3	4	Total
Tigers	0	6	8	0	14
No. 13 Crimson Tide	7	7	14	0	28

at Bryant–Denny Stadium • Tuscaloosa, Alabama

- Date: November 30, 2024
- Game time: 2:45 p.m. CST
- Referee: Daniel Gautreaux
- TV announcers (ABC): Sean McDonough (play-by-play), Greg McElroy (analyst), and Molly McGrath (sideline reporter)

Statistics	AUB	ALA
First downs	24	25
Total yards	399	457
Rushing yards	98	201
Passing yards	301	256
Passing: Comp–Att–Int	24-42-2	18-24-1
Time of possession	23:12	36:48

Team	Category	Player	Statistics
Auburn	Passing	Payton Thorne	24/41, 301 yards, 1 TD, INT
Auburn	Rushing	Jarquez Hunter	13 rushes, 56 yards
Auburn	Receiving	KeAndre Lambert-Smith	8 receptions, 116 yards
Alabama	Passing	Jalen Milroe	18/24, 256 yards, INT
Alabama	Rushing	Jalen Milroe	17 rushes, 104 yards, 3TDs
Alabama	Receiving	Germie Bernard	7 receptions, 111 yards

== Personnel ==
=== Coaching staff ===
Auburn Tigers coaches
Hugh Freeze	Head coach	2nd
Derrick Nix	Offensive coordinator/running backs	1st
DJ Durkin	Defensive coordinator/Linebackers	1st
Kent Austin	Quarterbacks coach	2nd overall; 1st as QB Coach
Ben Aigamaua	Tight ends coach	2nd
Josh Aldridge	Edges	2nd overall; 1st as Edge Coach
Marcus Davis	Wide receivers coach	2nd
Charles Kelly	Co-Defensive Coordinator/Secondary coach/Safeties	1st
Vontrell King-Williams	Defensive line coach	2nd overall; 1st as DL Coach
Wesley McGriff	Secondary coach/Cornerbacks	4th overall; 2nd consecutive
Jake Thornton	Offensive line coach	2nd

=== Transfers ===
==== Outgoing ====
Name	Number	Pos.	Height	Weight	Year	Hometown	Transfer to
Robby Ashford	#9	QB	6'4	219	Sophomore (redshirt)	Hoover, AL	South Carolina
Austin Ausberry	#8	S	6'0	196	Freshman (redshirt)	Baton Rouge, LA	LSU
Wilky Denaud	#40	DL	6'4	250	Freshman	Stuart, FL	Mississippi State
Marquise Gilbert	#14	S	6'2	180	Junior (redshirt)	Daytona Beach, FL	TBD
Malcolm Johnson Jr.	#16	WR	6'0.5	180	Junior	Bryans Road, MD	Bowling Green
Stephen Johnson	#56	DL	6'4	310	Freshman	Fayetteville, GA	McNeese
Stephen Sings V	#18	EDGE	6'3	225	Junior	Charlotte, NC	Charlotte
Ja'Varrius Johnson	#6	WR	5'9	165	Senior	Trussville, AL	UCF
Enyce Sledge	#90	DL	6'3	313	Freshman (redshirt)	Monroe, LA	Illinois
Tyler Fromm	#85	TE	6'5	225	Senior	Warner Robins, GA	Georgia Southern
Omari Kelly	#19	WR	5'11.5	174	Sophomore	Trussville, AL	Middle Tennessee
Jyaire Shorter	#14	WR	6'2	215	Senior (redshirt)	Killeen, TX	Memphis
Tony Hunley Jr.	#26	CB	5'9	171	Sophomore (redshirt)	Anniston, AL	TBD
Donovan Kaufman	#5	S	5'9	195	Junior	Metairie, LA	NC State
Colton Hood	#24	CB	6'1	175	Freshman	McDonough, GA	Colorado
Garner Langlo	#74	OT	6'7	270	Sophomore (redshirt)	Ocala, FL	Appalachian State
Cam Riley	#13	LB	6'4.5	210	Junior	Evergreen, AL	Florida State
J. D. Rhym	#23	CB	6'1	180	Freshman (redshirt)	Valdosta, GA	Houston
Kyle Vaccarella	#42	LS	6'3	240	Sophomore (redshirt)	Fairfield, CT	UConn
Garrison Walker	#96	DL	6'1	310	Junior	Toccoa, GA	New Mexico
Brenton Williams	#22	DL	6'4	245	Freshman	Opelika, AL	Liberty
Jay Fair	#5	WR	5'10	170	Sophomore	Rockwall, TX	USC
Wesley Steiner	#32	LB	6'0	220	Senior	Warner Robins, GA	Washington State
Koy Moore	#0	WR	6'1	172	Junior	Kenner, LA	Western Kentucky

==== Incoming ====
Name	Number	Pos.	Height	Weight	Year	Hometown	Prev. school
Dorian Mausi	#8	LB	6'2	233	Senior	Detroit, MI	Duke
Robert Lewis	#1	WR	5'11	175	Junior (redshirt)	Covington, GA	Georgia State
Gage Keys	#2	DL	6'5	280	Sophomore (redshirt)	Hilliard, OH	Kansas
Sam Jackson V	#5	QB	5'11	170	Sophomore (redshirt)	Naperville, IL	California
Percy Lewis	#75	OT	6'8	345	Senior	Sallis, MS	Mississippi State
Trill Carter	#98	DL	6'2	300	Senior	Leesburg, GA	Texas
Rico Walker	#17	TE	6'3	234	Freshman	Hickory, NC	Maryland
Jerrin Thompson	#1	S	6'0	190	Senior	Lufkin, TX	Texas
Antonio Kite	#8	S	6'1	180	Freshman (redshirt)	Anniston, AL	Alabama
Philip Blidi	#96	EDGE	6'4	255	Senior	Portales, NM	Indiana
KeAndre Lambert-Smith	#1	WR	6'1	188	Junior (redshirt)	Norfolk, VA	Penn State
Keyron Crawford	#24	BUCK	6'4	245	Junior	Memphis, TN	Arkansas State
Isaiah Raikes	#22	DL	6'1	327	Senior	Richland, NJ	USC
Ronan Chambers	#74	OT	6'6	270	Junior	Lakewood, OH	Akron
Fa'Najae Gotay	#38	LB	6'0	205	Senior (redshirt)	North Fort Myers, FL	Maryland
Ian Vachon	#90	K	6'0	190	Sophomore (redshirt)	Huntsville, AL	Birmingham–Southern
