= Connor Gibbs (American football) =

American football player

No. 41 – Auburn Tigers
- Position: Kicker
- Class: Redshirt Senior

Personal information
- Listed height: 5 ft 10 in (1.78 m)
- Listed weight: 185 lb (84 kg)

Career information
- High school: Metairie Park (Metairie, Louisiana)
- College: Southern Miss (2022–2024); Auburn (2025–present)
- Stats at ESPN

Connor Gibbs is an American football kicker who plays for the Auburn Tigers. He previously played for the Southern Miss Golden Eagles.

== Early life ==
Gibbs played for Metairie Park Country Day School as the starting kicker.

== College career ==
=== Southern Miss ===
Gibbs committed to Southern Miss in early spring of 2022 and played for them in his first three seasons of college football. He handled kickoffs throughout the 2022 season. In 2024, he scored a 59-yard field goal, his career long. He also scored ten of thirteen field goals in 2024, including three from longer than 50 yards.

=== Auburn ===
In December 2024, Gibbs committed to Auburn University. In the first two games of the season, Towns McGough was the designated long field goal kicker for Auburn. After McGough missed a field goal against the Ball State Cardinals, head coach Hugh Freeze stated that he was unsure who would take long field goals. Gibbs was announced as the new primary long field goal kicker for the next match.

=== Career statistics ===
Year	Team	GP	Field goals				Extra points			Total points
Year	Team	GP	FGM	FGA	FG%	Lng	XPM	XPA	XP%	Total points
2023	Southern Miss	12	0	1	0.0	N/A	2	2	100.0	2
2024	Southern Miss	12	10	13	76.9	59	7	10	70.0	37
2025	Auburn	12	0	1	0.0	N/A	0	0	N/A	0
