= Payton Thorne =

American football player (born 2001)

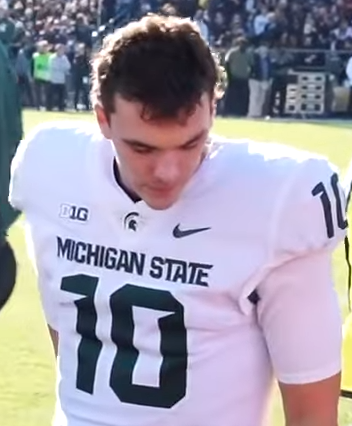
- Thorne with Michigan State in 2021

Profile
- Position: Quarterback

Personal information
- Born: June 26, 2001 (age 25)
- Listed height: 6 ft 2 in (1.88 m)
- Listed weight: 207 lb (94 kg)

Career information
- High school: Naperville Central (Naperville, Illinois)
- College: Michigan State (2019–2022); Auburn (2023–2024)
- NFL draft: 2025: undrafted

Career history
- Cincinnati Bengals (2025)*; Winnipeg Blue Bombers (2026)*
- * Offseason or practice squad member only

Payton Thorne (born June 26, 2001) is an American professional football quarterback. He played college football for the Michigan State Spartans and Auburn Tigers before signing with the Cincinnati Bengals as an undrafted free agent in 2025.

== Early life ==
Thorne originally attended Metea Valley High School in Aurora, Illinois before transferring to Naperville Central High School in Naperville, Illinois. As a senior in 2018, he was named the Chicago Sun-Times and Naperville Sun Player of the Year after throwing for 3,113 yards and 40 touchdowns. Thorne originally committed to Western Michigan University to play college football but later switched to Michigan State University.

== College career ==
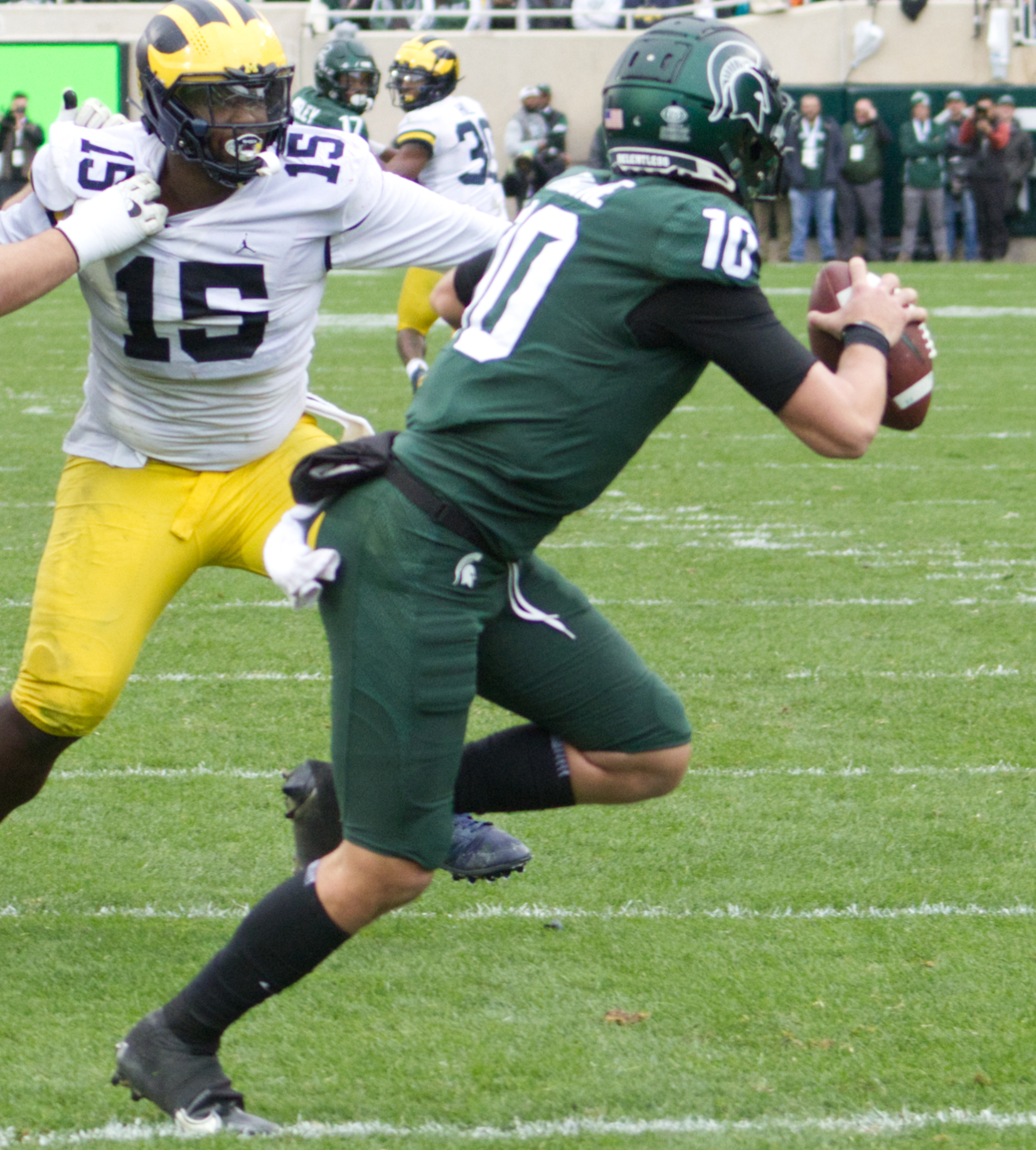
Thorne with Michigan State in 2021

Thorne was redshirted his first year at Michigan State in 2019.

In 2020, he played in four games as a backup to Rocky Lombardi and made one start. In his first career start against Penn State he passed for 325 yards and three touchdowns. For the season, he completed 48 of 85 passes for 582 yards with three touchdowns and three interceptions.

In 2021, Thorne was named the Spartans starter to open the season. In his first full year as a starter, Thorne threw for 3,240 yards, 27 TDs, 10 INTs, with a 77.7 QBR.He led Michigan State to an 11–2 record, including an 8–0 start and being ranked third in the AP Polls. He also won the Peach Bowl victory over Pittsburgh.

In 2022, Thorne started all 12 games. He recorded 2,679 yards passing, 19 touchdown passes, and one rushing touchdown.

In the 2023 offseason, Thorne transferred to Auburn to play under new head coach Hugh Freeze. He was a starter in 2023, and had 16 TDs with ten interceptions for the season. In 4 games, though, he failed to pass for 100 yards.

For 2024, he beat out freshmen Hank Brown and Walker White for the starter spot in summer practice, but was benched in favor of Brown following Auburn's week 2 loss against California where he threw 4 interceptions in a 21–14 loss. Two weeks later, due to Brown's poor play, Thorne returned to the starter. He finished the season with 21 touchdowns, nine interceptions, and 2,713 yards.

=== Statistics ===
Season	Team	Games			Passing								Rushing			
Season	Team	GP	GS	Record	Cmp	Att	Pct	Yds	Avg	TD	Int	Rtg	Att	Yds	Avg	TD
2019	Michigan State	Redshirt														
2020	Michigan State	4	1	0–1	48	85	56.5	582	6.8	3	3	118.6	25	47	1.9	1
2021	Michigan State	13	13	11–2	235	389	60.4	3,232	8.3	27	10	148.0	82	181	2.2	4
2022	Michigan State	12	12	5–7	242	387	62.5	2,679	6.9	19	11	131.2	60	42	0.7	1
2023	Auburn	13	12	6–6	162	265	61.1	1,755	7.0	16	10	129.1	134	515	3.8	3
2024	Auburn	11	10	4–6	199	317	62.8	2,713	8.6	21	9	150.8	112	283	2.5	2
Career		53	48	26–22	885	1,442	61.4	10,961	7.6	86	43	138.9	413	1,068	2.6	11

== Professional career ==
Pre-draft measurables
Height	Weight	Arm length	Hand span	40-yard dash	10-yard split	20-yard split	20-yard shuttle	Three-cone drill	Vertical jump	Broad jump
6 ft 1 5/8 in (1.87 m)	207 lb (94 kg)	31 in (0.79 m)	9 1/4 in (0.23 m)	4.70 s	1.67 s	2.69 s	4.25 s	7.20 s	31.0 in (0.79 m)	9 ft 9 in (2.97 m)
All values from Pro Day

=== Cincinnati Bengals ===
On May 9, 2025, Thorne signed with the Cincinnati Bengals as an undrafted free agent after going unselected in the 2025 NFL draft. He was waived on August 25.

=== Winnipeg Blue Bombers ===
On December 23, 2025, Thorne signed with the Winnipeg Blue Bombers of the Canadian Football League. He was placed on the reserve/suspended list on May 22, 2026.

== Personal life ==
Thorne is a Christian. His father, Jeff Thorne, was the offensive coordinator at Western Michigan in 2022. On December 9, 2025, Jeff died at 53 from stomach cancer.
