= Jarquez Hunter =

American football player (born 2002)

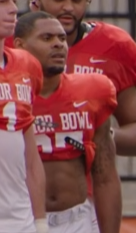
- Hunter at the 2025 Senior Bowl

Rhode Island Breakers
- Position: Running back
- Roster status: Unsigned draft pick

Personal information
- Born: December 29, 2002 (age 23)
- Listed height: 5 ft 9 in (1.75 m)
- Listed weight: 211 lb (96 kg)

Career information
- High school: Neshoba Central (Philadelphia, Mississippi)
- College: Auburn (2021–2024)
- NFL draft: 2025: 4th round, 117th overall pick

Career history
- Los Angeles Rams (2025); Miami Dolphins (2026)*; New Orleans Saints (2026)*; Rhode Island Breakers (2027-present)
- * Offseason or practice squad member only
- Stats at Pro Football Reference

Jarquez Hunter (born December 29, 2002) is an American professional football running back. He played college football for the Auburn Tigers and was selected by the Los Angeles Rams in the fourth round of the 2025 NFL draft.

== Early life ==
Hunter attended Neshoba Central High School in Philadelphia, Mississippi, where he was Mr. Football for the state of Mississippi as a senior. Hunter was rated a three-star recruit coming out of high school and was the nations 44th ranked running back recruit. He committed to play college football at Auburn University over Mississippi State and Iowa.

== College career ==
As a freshman, Hunter was Auburn's backup running back behind Tank Bigsby. In the Tiger's week 2 game against Alabama State, Hunter set an Auburn record for the longest rush in program history with a 94-yard touchdown rush. He finished the 2021 season with 593 yards on 6.7 yards per carry. In 2022 he ran for 668 yards on 6.4 yards per carry.

=== Statistics ===
Year	Team	Games		Rushing				Receiving			
Year	Team	GP	GS	Att	Yds	Avg	TD	Rec	Yds	Avg	TD
2021	Auburn	13	2	89	593	6.7	3	12	61	5.1	1
2022	Auburn	12	1	104	675	6.5	7	17	224	13.2	2
2023	Auburn	12	12	159	909	5.7	7	18	118	6.6	0
2024	Auburn	12	12	187	1,201	6.4	8	21	155	7.4	1
Career		49	27	539	3,378	6.3	25	68	558	8.2	4

== Professional career ==
Pre-draft measurables
Height	Weight	Arm length	Hand span	Wingspan	40-yard dash	10-yard split	20-yard split	20-yard shuttle	Vertical jump	Broad jump	Bench press
5 ft 9 3/8 in (1.76 m)	204 lb (93 kg)	30 in (0.76 m)	9 1/2 in (0.24 m)	6 ft 0 5/8 in (1.84 m)	4.44 s	1.58 s	2.59 s	4.47 s	33.5 in (0.85 m)	10 ft 0 in (3.05 m)	21 reps
All values from NFL Combine/Pro Day

=== Los Angeles Rams ===
Hunter was selected by the Los Angeles Rams in the fourth round (117th overall) of the 2025 NFL draft. He rushed for 110 yards on 31 carries and had one reception for two yards during the preseason and made the Rams' final roster. In the regular season, Hunter appeared on special teams in five of L.A.'s first six games, but was inactive for the remainder of the schedule and saw no further action.

=== Miami Dolphins ===
On August 27, 2026, the Rams traded Hunter to the Miami Dolphins in exchange for wide receiver Tutu Atwell. He was waived by the Dolphins three days later as a part of final roster cuts, then subsequently re-signed with the team's practice squad the following day. On October 13, Hunter was released.

=== New Orleans Saints ===
On October 14, 2026, Hunter signed with the New Orleans Saints' practice squad. On November 10, he was released.
