= Ian Vachon =

American football player

No. 29 – North Alabama Lions
- Position: Kicker
- Class: Redshirt Senior

Personal information
- Born: August 18, 2003 (age 23); Huntsville, Alabama, U.S.
- Listed height: 5 ft 11 in (1.80 m)
- Listed weight: 185 lb (84 kg)

Career information
- High school: Madison (Huntsville, Alabama)
- College: Birmingham—Southern (2022–2023); Auburn (2024); North Alabama (2025–present)
- Stats at ESPN

Ian Vachon (born August 18, 2003) is an American football kicker who plays for the North Alabama Lions. He previously played for the Birmingham–Southern Panthers and the Auburn Tigers.

== Early life ==
Vachon played for Madison Academy through 2022, where he was an all-region and all-metro kicker.

== College career ==
=== Birmingham–Southern ===
In 2023, Vachon played for Birmingham–Southern as a kicker, where he was the primary kickoff taker, kicked one field goal, and two extra points.

=== Auburn ===
Following the closure of Birmingham–Southern College, Vachon entered the transfer portal, and began working for a roofing company. In July, he joined the Auburn Tigers as a walk-on transfer. In the tenth game of the season, he was announced as the started and played his first game against Louisiana–Monroe. He scored two field goals and six extra points in his debut. In his second game, he was named as the starter against Texas A&M. He missed his first field goal of the match, and then scored a game-tying field goal to send the game into overtime. He scored a career long 41-yard field goal to send the game into its third overtime, and Auburn went on to win the game 43-41.

=== North Alabama ===
In April 2025, Vachon announced that he would be entering the transfer portal. He committed to the University of North Alabama in May. In his first start for the team, he scored two field goals against the Western Kentucky Hilltoppers, amounting for all six of North Alabama's points in that game. He set a school record with a 55-yard field goal against the Northeastern State RiverHawks.

=== Career statistics ===
Year	Team	GP	Field goals				Extra points			Total points
Year	Team	GP	FGM	FGA	FG%	Lng	XPM	XPA	XP%	Total points
2023	Birmingham–Southern	8	1	4	25.0	26	2	4	50.0	5
2024	Auburn	4	6	8	75.0	41	11	11	100.0	29
2025	North Alabama	11	8	13	61.5	55	10	14	71.4	34
