= Hank Brown (American football) =

American football player (born 2005)

- Brown in 2026

No. 9 – Iowa Hawkeyes
- Position: Quarterback
- Class: Redshirt Junior

Personal information
- Born: March 30, 2005 (age 21)
- Listed height: 6 ft 4 in (1.93 m)
- Listed weight: 215 lb (98 kg)

Career information
- High school: Lipscomb Academy (Nashville, Tennessee)
- College: Auburn (2023–2024); Iowa (2025–present)
- Stats at ESPN

Hank Brown (born March 30, 2005) is an American college football quarterback for the Iowa Hawkeyes. He previously played for the Auburn Tigers.

== Early life ==
Brown began his high school career playing at Wheaton-Warrenville South High School in Wheaton, Illinois. Following outrage with their school district during the COVID-19 Pandemic, Brown and family moved to Nashville, Tennessee and attended Lipscomb Academy where he was coached by Super Bowl winning quarterback Trent Dilfer. After playing sparingly as a junior, throwing for 223 yards and two touchdowns, Brown committed to Liberty. In his senior season, he threw for 3,264 yards and 47 touchdowns, leading Lipscomb to a 13–0 record and a state championship. A three-star recruit, Brown flipped his commitment to play college football from Liberty to Auburn University, following head coach Hugh Freeze.

== College career ==
=== Auburn ===
Brown made his collegiate debut during the 2023 Music City Bowl in relief of Payton Thorne and Holden Geriner, throwing for a team-high 132 yards on seven completions. Entering the 2024 season, Brown was named the backup to Thorne. After poor play from Thorne, Brown was named the starting quarterback against New Mexico. In his first career start, he threw for 235 yards and four touchdowns in a 45–19 victory. The following game against Arkansas, Brown was benched in favor of Thorne after throwing three interceptions in the first half of a 24–14 defeat. He finished his redshirt freshman season throwing for 403 yards, six touchdowns, and three interceptions. On December 8, 2024, Brown announced that he would enter the transfer portal.

=== Iowa ===
On December 13, 2024, Brown announced his decision to transfer to the University of Iowa to play for the Iowa Hawkeyes.

=== Statistics ===
Year	Team	Games			Passing								Rushing			
Year	Team	GP	GS	Record	Cmp	Att	Pct	Yds	Y/A	TD	Int	Rtg	Att	Yds	Avg	TD
2023	Auburn	1	0	—	7	9	77.8	132	14.7	0	0	201.0	0	0	0.0	0
2024	Auburn	4	2	1–1	27	43	66.6	403	9.4	6	3	173.6	3	10	3.3	0
2025	Iowa	3	0	—	11	21	52.4	107	5.1	1	1	101.4	3	–3	–1.0	1
2026	Iowa	8	7	6–1	125	190	65.8	1,316	6.9	9	4	135.4	27	51	1.9	2
Career		16	9	7−2	170	263	64.6	1,958	7.4	16	8	141.2	33	58	1.8	3
