= 2020 Maryland Terrapins football team =

American college football season

2020 Maryland Terrapins football
- Conference: Big Ten Conference
- East Division
- Record: 2–3 (2–3 Big Ten)
- Head coach: Mike Locksley (2nd season)
- Offensive coordinator: Scottie Montgomery (2nd season)
- Offensive scheme: Spread option
- Defensive coordinator: Jon Hoke (2nd season)
- Base defense: 3–4
- Home stadium: Byrd Stadium

2020 Big Ten Conference football standings
	Conf.			Overall
Team	W		L	W		L
East Division
No. 2 Ohio State xy$^	5	–	0	7	–	1
No. 12 Indiana	6	–	1	6	–	2
Penn State	4	–	5	4	–	5
Maryland	2	–	3	2	–	3
Rutgers	3	–	6	3	–	6
Michigan	2	–	4	2	–	4
Michigan State	2	–	5	2	–	5
West Division
No. 10 Northwestern xy	6	–	1	7	–	2
No. 16 Iowa	6	–	2	6	–	2
Wisconsin	3	–	3	4	–	3
Minnesota	3	–	4	3	–	4
Nebraska	3	–	5	3	–	5
Purdue	2	–	4	2	–	4
Illinois	2	–	6	2	–	6
Championship: Ohio State 22, Northwestern 10
^ – College Football Playoff participant; $ – Conference champion; x – Division champion/co-champions; y – Championship game participant; Note: Due to COVID-19, the Big Ten suspended the season on August 11, but later decided to begin play on October 24. In addition to the title game that was played on December 19, the conference seeded all remaining teams for "championship week" games.; Rankings from AP Poll.

The 2020 Maryland Terrapins football team represented the University of Maryland, College Park in the 2020 NCAA Division I FBS football season. The Terrapins played their home games at Maryland Stadium in College Park, Maryland and competed in the East Division of the Big Ten Conference.

On August 11, 2020, the Big Ten Conference canceled all fall sports competitions due to the COVID-19 pandemic. On September 16, the conference reinstated the football season, announcing a nine-game season beginning on October 23 and 24, 2020. Due to in-season cancellations related to the pandemic, the Terrapins played only five of their scheduled nine games. The Terrapins declined a bowl game invitation, also due to the pandemic.

== Offseason ==
=== Recruiting ===
College recruiting (2020)
Name	Hometown	School	Height	Weight	Commit date
Jakorian Bennett; DB	Mobile, AL	McGill-Toolen Catholic High School	6 ft 0 in (1.83 m)	185 lb (84 kg)	Dec 17, 2019
Jakorian Bennett; DB	Recruit ratings: Rivals: 247Sports: ESPN: (77)				
Peny Boone; RB	Detroit, MI	Martin Luther King High School	6 ft 2 in (1.88 m)	225 lb (102 kg)	Jun 17, 2019
Peny Boone; RB	Recruit ratings: Rivals: 247Sports: ESPN: (78)				
Beau Brade; DB	Clarksville, MD	River Hill High School	6 ft 0 in (1.83 m)	190 lb (86 kg)	Jun 13, 2019
Beau Brade; DB	Recruit ratings: Rivals: 247Sports: ESPN: (78)				
Johari Branch; OL	Chicago, IL	Phillips Academy	6 ft 3.5 in (1.92 m)	325 lb (147 kg)	Dec 7, 2019
Johari Branch; OL	Recruit ratings: Rivals: 247Sports: ESPN: (72)				
Frankie Burgess; LB	Pahokee, FL	Pahokee High School	6 ft 3 in (1.91 m)	215 lb (98 kg)	Dec 18, 2019
Frankie Burgess; LB	Recruit ratings: Rivals: 247Sports: ESPN: (76)				
Nick DeGennaro; WR	Princeton, NJ	Hun School	6 ft 0 in (1.83 m)	183 lb (83 kg)	Jun 23, 2019
Nick DeGennaro; WR	Recruit ratings: Rivals: 247Sports: ESPN: (73)				
Ami Finau; DL	Euless, TX	Trinity High School	6 ft 2 in (1.88 m)	320 lb (150 kg)	Dec 8, 2019
Ami Finau; DL	Recruit ratings: Rivals: 247Sports: ESPN: (78)				
Delmar Glaze; OL	Charlotte, NC	West Mecklenburg High School	6 ft 5 in (1.96 m)	315 lb (143 kg)	Dec 11, 2019
Delmar Glaze; OL	Recruit ratings: Rivals: 247Sports: ESPN: (73)				
Ja'Khi Green; OL	Baltimore, MD	St. Frances Academy	6 ft 6 in (1.98 m)	320 lb (150 kg)	Apr 20, 2019
Ja'Khi Green; OL	Recruit ratings: Rivals: 247Sports: ESPN: (76)				
Ruben Hyppolite II; LB	Hollywood, FL	McArthur High School	6 ft 0 in (1.83 m)	225 lb (102 kg)	Apr 27, 2019
Ruben Hyppolite II; LB	Recruit ratings: Rivals: 247Sports: ESPN: (81)				
Isaiah Jacobs; RB	Owasso, OK	Owasso High School	5 ft 10 in (1.78 m)	190 lb (86 kg)	Dec 18, 2019
Isaiah Jacobs; RB	Recruit ratings: Rivals: 247Sports: ESPN: (77)				
Rakim Jarrett; WR	Washington D.C.	St. John's College High School	6 ft 0 in (1.83 m)	208 lb (94 kg)	Dec 18, 2019
Rakim Jarrett; WR	Recruit ratings: Rivals: 247Sports: ESPN: (87)				
TJ Kautai; LB	Euless, TX	Trinity High School	6 ft 1 in (1.85 m)	240 lb (110 kg)	Dec 8, 2019
TJ Kautai; LB	Recruit ratings: Rivals: 247Sports: ESPN: (71)				
Devyn King; DB	Gardena, CA	Junipero Serra High School	5 ft 11 in (1.80 m)	175 lb (79 kg)	Apr 16, 2019
Devyn King; DB	Recruit ratings: Rivals: 247Sports: ESPN: (75)				
Khristopher Love; OL	Fort Lauderdale, FL	American Heritage High School	6 ft 3 in (1.91 m)	315 lb (143 kg)	Dec 15, 2019
Khristopher Love; OL	Recruit ratings: Rivals: 247Sports: ESPN: (76)				
Deajaun McDougle; WR	Deerfield Beach, FL	Deerfield Beach High School	5 ft 10 in (1.78 m)	175 lb (79 kg)	Jul 30, 2019
Deajaun McDougle; WR	Recruit ratings: Rivals: 247Sports: ESPN: (80)				
Glen Miller; DB	Orange Park, FL	Ridgeview High School	6 ft 3 in (1.91 m)	190 lb (86 kg)	Dec 9, 2019
Glen Miller; DB	Recruit ratings: Rivals: 247Sports: ESPN: (74)				
Amelio Moran; OL	Virginia Beach, VA	Princess Anne High School	6 ft 5 in (1.96 m)	308 lb (140 kg)	Dec 15, 2019
Amelio Moran; OL	Recruit ratings: Rivals: 247Sports: ESPN: (72)				
Shane Mosley; DB	Havertown, PA	Haverford High School	5 ft 11 in (1.80 m)	185 lb (84 kg)	Jun 20, 2019
Shane Mosley; DB	Recruit ratings: Rivals: 247Sports: ESPN: (74)				
Mosiah Nasili-Kite; DL	Puyallup, WA	Emerald Ridge High School	6 ft 2 in (1.88 m)	298 lb (135 kg)	Dec 9, 2019
Mosiah Nasili-Kite; DL	Recruit ratings: Rivals: 247Sports: ESPN: (74)				
Zach Perkins; OL	Tampa, FL	Berkeley Preparatory School	6 ft 4 in (1.93 m)	321 lb (146 kg)	Dec 13, 2019
Zach Perkins; OL	Recruit ratings: Rivals: 247Sports: ESPN: (72)				
Osita Smith; DB	New Berlin, NY	Milford Academy	6 ft 2 in (1.88 m)	205 lb (93 kg)	Dec 16, 2019
Osita Smith; DB	Recruit ratings: Rivals: 247Sports: ESPN: (76)				
Tre Smith; DL	Frostburg, MD	Mountain Ridge High School	6 ft 2 in (1.88 m)	285 lb (129 kg)	Sep 18, 2019
Tre Smith; DL	Recruit ratings: Rivals: 247Sports: ESPN: (72)				
Tarheeb Still; DB	Sicklerville, NJ	Timber Creek Regional High School	6 ft 0 in (1.83 m)	165 lb (75 kg)	Jun 19, 2019
Tarheeb Still; DB	Recruit ratings: Rivals: 247Sports: ESPN: (75)				
Almosse Titi; DL	Tampa, FL	American Collegiate Academy	6 ft 3 in (1.91 m)	310 lb (140 kg)	Feb 2, 2020
Almosse Titi; DL	Recruit ratings: Rivals: 247Sports: ESPN: (75)				
Riyad Wilmot; DL	Fort Lauderdale, FL	St. Thomas Aquinas High School	6 ft 3 in (1.91 m)	248 lb (112 kg)	Dec 15, 2019
Riyad Wilmot; DL	Recruit ratings: Rivals: 247Sports: ESPN: (78)				
Overall recruit ranking: Rivals: 61 247Sports: 31 ESPN: 44
Note: In many cases, Scout, Rivals, 247Sports, On3, and ESPN may conflict in their listings of height and weight.; In these cases, the average was taken. ESPN grades are on a 100-point scale.; Sources: "2020 Team Ranking". Rivals.com.

=== Incoming transfers ===
Name	Pos.	Height	Weight	Class	Hometown	College transferred from
Jakorian Bennett	DB	5'11"	200	Junior	Mobile, Al	Hutchinson CC
Joseph Boletepeli	DL	6'4"	260	Sophomore	Raleigh, NC	NC State
Johari Branch	OL	6'3"	330	Junior	Chicago, ILL	Independence CC
Jordan Castleberry	RB	5'8"	193	Redshirt Freshman	Lakewood, OH	Michigan
Devon Dickerson	DB	6'0"	175	Junior	Elkins Park, PA	Robert Morris
Challen Faamatau	RB	5'11"	225	Junior	Kalihi, HI	Coffeyville CC
Ami Finau	DL	6'2"	330	Junior	Euless, TX	Independence CC
Amelio Moran	OL	6'6"	330	Sophomore	Virginia Beach, VA	Lackawanna College
Greg Rose	DL	6'3"	271	Junior	Los Angeles, CA	Lackawanna College
Taulia Tagovailoa	QB	5'11"	205	Sophomore	Ewa Beach, HI	Alabama
Jha'mel Thorne	RB	5'10"	201	Sophomore	Fredrick, MD	Stevenson
Almosse Titi	DL	6'2"	305	Redshirt Sophomore	Tampa, FL	Iowa Western CC

=== Awards and honors ===
==== Watch list ====
Award	Player	Position	Year
Rimington Trophy	Johnny Jordan	C	SR

== Roster ==
2020 Maryland Terrapins football team roster
Players
Coaches
Offense

Pos.	#	Name	Class
WR	2	DeaJaun McDougle	Fr
QB	3	Taulia Tagovailoa	So
RB	4	Isaiah Jacobs	Fr
WR	5	Rakim Jarrett	Fr
WR	6	Jeshaun Jones	So
WR	7	Dontay Demus Jr.	Jr
RB	8	Tayon Fleet-Davis	Sr
TE	9	Chig Okonkwo	Jr
TE	10	Tyler Baylor	So
QB	12	Lance LeGendre	Fr
RB	13	Peny Boone	Fr
QB	14	David Foust	Fr
WR	15	Brian Cobbs	Jr
WR	16	Dino Tomlin	Fr
WR	17	Nick DeGennaro	Fr
QB	18	Josh Ettlinger	Fr
WR	21	Darryl Jones	Jr
QB	22	Eric Najarian	So
WR	26	Justin Brown	Jr
WR	30	Daniel Anderson	Sr
RB	31	Jonathan Smith	Fr
RB	32	Rashard Jackson	Fr
RB	33	Jha'mel Thorne	So
RB	34	Jake Funk	Sr
RB	35	Challen Faamatau	Jr
RB	41	Jordan Castleberry	Fr
TE	42	Kameron Blount	Fr
TE	45	Zack Roski	Sr
OL	52	Evan Gregory	So
OL	54	Spencer Anderson	So
OL	55	Austin Fontaine	So
OL	57	TJ Bradley	Sr
OL	60	Khris Love	Fr
OL	61	Brian Armentrout	Fr
OL	63	Tyler Hamilton	Sr
OL	64	Marcus Finger	Fr
OL	65	Johari Branch	Jr
OL	68	Sean Wilkins	Fr
OL	69	Mitchell Gorgas	Fr
OL	70	Amelio Moran	Fr
OL	71	Jaelyn Duncan	So
OL	72	Marcus Minor	Jr
OL	73	Johnny Jordan	Sr
OL	74	Delmar Glaze	Fr
OL	75	Ja'Khi Green	Fr
RB	77	Zach Perkins	Fr
OL	78	Mason Lunsford	Fr
WR	80	Sean Leonard	Fr
TE	81	Conor Fagan	Fr
WR	83	Carlos Carriere	Jr
WR	84	Corey Dyches	Fr
WR	85	Jacob Hess	Fr
TE	86	Malik Jackson	Fr
WR	88	DeJuan Ellis	So

Defense

Pos.	#	Name	Class
LB	1	Shaq Smith	Sr
DB	2	Jakorian Bennett	Jr
DB	3	Nick Cross	Fr
DL	9	Joseph Boletepeli	So
LB	11	Ruben Hyppolite II	Fr
DB	12	Vincent Flythe	So
DB	12	Tarheeb Still	Fr
DB	14	Isaiah Hazel	So
LB	16	Ayinde Eley	Jr
DB	18	Jordan Mosley	Jr
LB	19	Ahmad McCullough	So
DB	20	Antwaine Richardson	Sr
LB	22	TJ Kautai	Jr
DB	22	Osita Smith	Fr
LB	23	Fa'Najae Gotay	So
DB	24	Kenny Bennett	Jr
DB	25	Beau Brade	Fr
DB	26	Erwin Byrd	Fr
DB	27	Devon Dickerson	Jr
DB	29	Devyn King	Fr
LB	30	Durell Nchami	So
DB	31	Tahj Capehart	Jr
DB	32	Shane Mosley	Fr
DB	33	Deonte Banks	So
DL	34	Mosiah Nasili-Kite	So
LB	35	Kobi Thomas	So
LB	36	Cortez Andrews	So
DB	37	Lavonte Gater	So
DB	38	Glen Miller	Fr
LB	39	Deshawn Holt	Fr
DB	40	Owura Berko	So
DB	41	Rex Fleming	Fr
LB	44	Chance Campbell	Jr
DL	46	Greg Rose	Jr
LB	49	David Brownlee	Jr
LB	50	Alex Simet	So
DL	51	Jacob Purcell	So
LB	53	Sean Greeley	So
DL	55	Ami Finau	Jr
LB	56	Shazali Audu	Fr
DL	58	Isaac Bunyun	Fr
DL	59	Ryan Brown	Fr
DL	77	Cherokee Glasgow	Jr
DL	88	Jalen Alexander	So
DL	89	Anthony Booker Jr.	Fr
DL	90	B'Ahmad Miller	Jr
DL	91	Tre Smith	Fr
DL	91	Almosse Titi	So
DL	93	Riyad Wilmot	Fr
DL	95	Lawtez Rogers	Jr
DL	97	Sam Okuayinonu	Sr
LB	99	Frankie Burgess	Fr

Special teams

Pos.	#	Name	Class
K	27	Joseph Petrino	Jr
LS	40	Sebastian Alonso	Fr
K	43	Hunter Patrick	Fr
LS	47	James Rosenberry	Jr
LS	58	Paul Mouring	So
K	87	Hunter Simmons	Fr
K	92	Greg Torcaso	So
K	96	Tyler Rockhill	Sr
P	98	Anthony Pecorella	So
P	99	Colton Spangler	So

Head coach

- Mike Locksley

Coordinators/assistant coaches

- Scottie Montgomery (offensive coordinator / quarterbacks coach)
- Jon Hoke (defensive coordinator / safeties coach)
- Joker Phillips (co-offensive Coordinator / wide receivers coach)
- George Helow (special teams coordinator / inside linebackers coach)
- John Reagan (offensive line coach)
- Brian Williams (defensive line coach)
- Elijah Brooks (running backs coach)
- Mike Miller (Tight Ends Coach)
- Brawley Evans (outside linebackers coach)
- Henry Baker (Cornerbacks Coach)

Legend

- (C) Team captain
- (S) Suspended
- (I) Ineligible
- Injured
- Redshirt

Roster

== Schedule ==
Maryland had games scheduled against Towson, Northern Illinois, and West Virginia, but canceled these games on July 9 following the Big Ten Conference's decision to play a 10-game conference-only schedule due to the COVID-19 pandemic. This 10 game, conference-only schedule was later canceled and replaced by a nine-game, conference-only schedule beginning in late October. Teams not selected to participate in the Big Ten Football Championship Game were scheduled to play a ninth consolation game on December 19, seeded by performance in the first eight games.

On November 11, the school announced that the November 14 game against Ohio State had been canceled as all team-related activities were paused because of an elevated number of coronavirus cases within the Terrapins' program. Subsequently, the game against Michigan State was also canceled, then rescheduled in the December 19 consolation game slot, before being canceled again due to further coronavirus cases. On December 2, it was announced that the December 5 game against Michigan had been canceled.

Date	Time	Opponent	Site	TV	Result	Attendance
October 24	7:30 p.m.	at Northwestern	Ryan Field; Evanston, Illinois	BTN	L 3–43	0
October 30	7:30 p.m.	Minnesota	Maryland Stadium; College Park, Maryland	ESPN	W 45–44^{OT}	0
November 7	3:30 p.m.	at Penn State	Beaver Stadium; University Park, Pennsylvania (rivalry)	BTN	W 35–19	1,500
November 14	3:30 p.m.	No. 3 Ohio State	Maryland Stadium; College Park, Maryland	BTN	No contest	
November 21	12:00 p.m.	Michigan State	Maryland Stadium; College Park, Maryland	BTN	No contest	
November 28	12:00 p.m.	at No. 12 Indiana	Memorial Stadium; Bloomington, Indiana	ESPN2	L 11–27	963
December 5	3:30 p.m.	at Michigan	Michigan Stadium; Ann Arbor, Michigan	BTN	No contest	
December 12	12:00 p.m.	Rutgers	Maryland Stadium; College Park, Maryland	BTN	L 24–27^{OT}	0
Rankings from AP Poll and CFP Rankings (after November 24) released prior to game; All times are in Eastern time

== Players drafted into the NFL ==
Round	Pick	Player	Position	NFL Club
7	233	Jake Funk	RB	Los Angeles Rams
