= 2022 Maryland Terrapins football team =

American college football season

2022 Maryland Terrapins football

Duke’s Mayo Bowl champion

Duke's Mayo Bowl, W 16–12 vs. NC State
- Conference: Big Ten Conference
- East Division
- Record: 8–5 (4–5 Big Ten)
- Head coach: Mike Locksley (4th season)
- Offensive coordinator: Dan Enos (2nd season)
- Co-offensive coordinator: Mike Miller (1st season)
- Offensive scheme: Pro spread
- Defensive coordinator: Brian Williams (1st season)
- Base defense: 4–3
- Home stadium: SECU Stadium

2022 Big Ten Conference football standings
	Conf.			Overall
Team	W		L	W		L
East Division
No. 3 Michigan xy$^	9	–	0	13	–	1
No. 4 Ohio State ^	8	–	1	11	–	2
No. 7 Penn State	7	–	2	11	–	2
Maryland	4	–	5	8	–	5
Indiana	2	–	7	4	–	8
Rutgers	1	–	8	4	–	8
Michigan State†	0	–	6	0	–	7
West Division
Purdue xy	6	–	3	8	–	6
Illinois	5	–	4	8	–	5
Iowa	5	–	4	8	–	5
Minnesota	5	–	4	9	–	4
Wisconsin	4	–	5	7	–	6
Nebraska	3	–	6	4	–	8
Northwestern	1	–	8	1	–	11
Championship: Michigan 43, Purdue 22
^ – College Football Playoff participant; $ – Conference champion; x – Division champion/co-champions; y – Championship game participant; † — NCAA vacated all wins for Michigan State (5–7, 3–6); Rankings from AP Poll

The 2022 Maryland Terrapins football team represented the University of Maryland during the 2022 NCAA Division I FBS football season. The Terrapins played their home games at SECU Stadium in College Park, Maryland, and competed in the Big Ten Conference in the East Division. The team was coached by fourth-year head coach Mike Locksley and finished in fourth place in the East Division. The Terrapins defeated NC State in the Duke's Mayo Bowl to achieve their first back-to-back bowl game wins since 2002-03.

== Offseason ==
=== Coaching staff changes ===
Head coach Mike Locksley signed a five-year, $21 million contract extension on April 29.

Defensive coordinator Brian Stewart was internally demoted after the previous season's loss to Michigan and replaced by defensive line coach Brian Williams. Maryland reached an agreement with Kevin Steele to become the Terrapins' defensive coordinator, but the deal fell apart when Steele took the same job at Miami. Stewart, who was to remain on staff as an assistant under Steele, was then fired. On February 10, Williams was officially announced as the new defensive coordinator.

Special teams coordinator Ron Zook resigned and was replaced by his former analyst James Thomas Jr.

Wide receivers coach Zohn Burden departed for the same job at Duke and was replaced by Louisville wide receivers coach Gunter Brewer.

Tight ends coach Mike Miller was promoted to co-offensive coordinator.

=== Recruiting class ===
College recruiting (2022)
Name	Hometown	School	Height	Weight	Commit date
Ramon Brown; RB	Midlothian, VA	Manchester High School	5 ft 11 in (1.80 m)	195 lb (88 kg)	Dec 14, 2021
Ramon Brown; RB	Recruit ratings: Rivals: 247Sports: ESPN: (83)				
Jaishawn Barham; LB	Baltimore, MD	St. Frances Academy	6 ft 3 in (1.91 m)	230 lb (100 kg)	Dec 15, 2021
Jaishawn Barham; LB	Recruit ratings: Rivals: 247Sports: ESPN: (83)				
Shaleak Knotts; WR	Monroe, NC	Monroe High School	6 ft 2 in (1.88 m)	175 lb (79 kg)	Aug 15, 2021
Shaleak Knotts; WR	Recruit ratings: Rivals: 247Sports: ESPN: (82)				
Cameron Edge; QB	Smyrna, DE	Smyrna High School	6 ft 2 in (1.88 m)	195 lb (88 kg)	Feb 2, 2022
Cameron Edge; QB	Recruit ratings: Rivals: 247Sports: ESPN: (81)				
Preston Howard; ATH	Owings Mills, MD	McDonogh School	6 ft 6 in (1.98 m)	215 lb (98 kg)	Feb 21, 2021
Preston Howard; ATH	Recruit ratings: Rivals: 247Sports: ESPN: (80)				
Jayden Sauray; QB	Upper Malboro, MD	Dr. Henry A. Wise Jr. High School	5 ft 11 in (1.80 m)	200 lb (91 kg)	Apr 26, 2021
Jayden Sauray; QB	Recruit ratings: Rivals: 247Sports: ESPN: (80)				
Andre Roye; OL	Baltimore, MD	St. Frances Academy	6 ft 5 in (1.96 m)	265 lb (120 kg)	Dec 15, 2021
Andre Roye; OL	Recruit ratings: Rivals: 247Sports: ESPN: (79)				
Perry Fisher; ATH	Tallahassee, FL	Lincoln High School	6 ft 2 in (1.88 m)	180 lb (82 kg)	Dec 15, 2021
Perry Fisher; ATH	Recruit ratings: Rivals: 247Sports: ESPN: (79)				
Octavian Smith; ATH	Burtonsville, MD	Paint Branch High School	6 ft 0 in (1.83 m)	170 lb (77 kg)	Dec 15, 2021
Octavian Smith; ATH	Recruit ratings: Rivals: 247Sports: ESPN: (78)				
Bam Booker; LB	Cincinnati, OH	Winton Woods High School	6 ft 3 in (1.91 m)	220 lb (100 kg)	Jul 29, 2020
Bam Booker; LB	Recruit ratings: Rivals: 247Sports: ESPN: (78)				
Caleb Wheatland; LB	Centreville, VA	The Avalon School	6 ft 1 in (1.85 m)	225 lb (102 kg)	Jun 17, 2021
Caleb Wheatland; LB	Recruit ratings: Rivals: 247Sports: ESPN: (78)				
Gavin Gibson; S	Hickory, NC	William A. Hough High School	5 ft 11 in (1.80 m)	180 lb (82 kg)	Dec 8, 2021
Gavin Gibson; S	Recruit ratings: Rivals: 247Sports: ESPN: (78)				
Lavain Scruggs; ATH	Baltimore, MD	Archbishop Spalding High School	6 ft 2 in (1.88 m)	186 lb (84 kg)	Jul 16, 2021
Lavain Scruggs; ATH	Recruit ratings: Rivals: 247Sports: ESPN: (77)				
Leon Haughton Jr. WR	Richmond, VA	Benedictine College Preparatory	6 ft 4 in (1.93 m)	200 lb (91 kg)	Dec 14, 2021
Leon Haughton Jr. WR	Recruit ratings: Rivals: 247Sports: ESPN: (77)				
Daniel Owens; DL	Baltimore, MD	Calvert Hall College High School	6 ft 3 in (1.91 m)	220 lb (100 kg)	Oct 20, 2021
Daniel Owens; DL	Recruit ratings: Rivals: 247Sports: ESPN: (77)				
Kellan Wyatt; LB	Severn, MD	Archbishop Spalding High School	6 ft 2 in (1.88 m)	215 lb (98 kg)	Sep 27, 2020
Kellan Wyatt; LB	Recruit ratings: Rivals: 247Sports: ESPN: (76)				
Lionell Whitaker; CB	Tallahassee, FL	James S. Rickards High School	5 ft 11 in (1.80 m)	175 lb (79 kg)	Jan 4, 2021
Lionell Whitaker; CB	Recruit ratings: Rivals: 247Sports: ESPN: (76)				
Keon Kindred; OL	Belle Glade, FL	Glades Central High School	6 ft 4 in (1.93 m)	290 lb (130 kg)	Oct 28, 2021
Keon Kindred; OL	Recruit ratings: Rivals: 247Sports: ESPN: (75)				
Coltin Deery; OL	Malvern, PA	Malvern Prep	6 ft 3 in (1.91 m)	275 lb (125 kg)	Mar 12, 2021
Coltin Deery; OL	Recruit ratings: Rivals: 247Sports: ESPN: (74)				
Ja'Kavion Nonar; OL	Belle Glade, FL	Glades Central High School	6 ft 7 in (2.01 m)	280 lb (130 kg)	Oct 28, 2021
Ja'Kavion Nonar; OL	Recruit ratings: Rivals: 247Sports: ESPN: (74)				
Liridon Mujezinovic (Note: Mujezinovic enrolled with the 2022 recruiting class, but left the team on May 1.); OL	Amsterdam, NL	Garden City Community College	6 ft 7 in (2.01 m)	290 lb (130 kg)	Jan 30, 2022
Liridon Mujezinovic; OL	Recruit ratings: Rivals: 247Sports: ESPN: (74)				
Maximus McCree; OL	Grandview, MO	Iowa Central Community College	6 ft 7 in (2.01 m)	290 lb (130 kg)	Dec 15, 2021
Maximus McCree; OL	Recruit ratings: Rivals: 247Sports: ESPN: (73)				
Overall recruit ranking: Rivals: #36 247Sports: #31
Note: In many cases, Scout, Rivals, 247Sports, On3, and ESPN may conflict in their listings of height and weight.; In these cases, the average was taken. ESPN grades are on a 100-point scale.; Sources: "Rivals commits". Rivals.; "ESPN commits". ESPN.; "2022 Team Ranking". Rivals.com.; "247Sports commits". 247Sports.

=== Outgoing transfers ===
31 players elected to enter the NCAA transfer portal during or after the 2021 season.

Name	Pos.	New school
Frankie Burgess	LB	Jackson State
Isaiah Jacobs	RB	Independence Community College
Joseph Boletepeli	DL	None
Mitchell Gorgas	OL	Texas A&M-Commerce
Peny Boone	RB	Toledo
Terrence Lewis	LB	UCF
Zach Perkins	OL	South Florida
Branden Jennings	LB	Kansas State
Almosse Titi	DL	Iowa Western Community College
Rashard Jackson	RB	Virginia Union
Deajaun McDougle	WR	Tulane
Osita Smith	S	West Virginia
Reece Udinski	QB	Richmond
Carlos Carriere	WR	Central Michigan
Evan Gregory	OL	Norfolk State
Darryl Jones	WR	NC State
Brian Cobbs	WR	Utah State
Nick DeGennaro	WR	Richmond
Deshawn Holt	DL	Toledo
Malik Jackson	TE	Towson
DeJuan Ellis	WR	Rhode Island
Dino Tomlin	WR	Boston College
Devon Dickerson	S	None
Demeioun Robinson	DL	Penn State
Darrell Jackson	DL	Miami
Andre Porter	DL	Iowa Central Community College
Kenny Bennett	CB	Georgia Tech
Liridon Mujezinovic	OL	Delaware State
Lavonte Gater	CB	Kent State
Devyn King	CB	Hawaii
Marcus Fleming	WR	None

=== Incoming transfers ===
The Terrapins added eight players from the NCAA transfer portal.

Name	Pos.	Previous school
Vandarius Cowan	LB	West Virginia
Jacob Copeland	WR	Florida
Chad Ryland	K	Eastern Michigan
Quashon Fuller	DL	Florida State
Henry Chibueze	DL	Liberty
Billy Edwards	QB	Wake Forest
Chantz Harley	CB	Villanova
Khalid Jones	WR	Shepherd

== Roster ==
2022 Maryland Terrapins football team roster
Players
Coaches
Offense

Pos.	#	Name	Class
WR	1	Rakim Jarrett	Jr
WR	2	Jacob Copeland	Jr
QB	3	Taulia Tagovailoa	Jr
WR	4	Shaleak Knotts	Fr
WR	6	Jeshaun Jones	Sr
WR	7	Dontay Demus Jr.	Sr
RB	8	Ramon Brown	Fr
QB	9	Billy Edwards Jr.	Fr
WR	10	Tai Felton	So
QB	12	Ryan Duell	Fr
QB	12	Cameron Edge	Fr
QB	13	Jayden Sauray	Fr
QB	14	David Foust	So
WR	15	Octavian Smith Jr.	Fr
WR	16	Leon Haughton Jr.	Fr
TE	18	CJ Dippre	So
QB	18	John Griffith	Fr
TE	19	Weston Wolff	Fr
QB	22	Eric Najarian	Jr
RB	23	Colby McDonald	So
RB	24	Roman Hemby	Fr
RB	27	Eli Mason	Fr
RB	29	Challen Faamatau	Sr
RB	31	Antwain Littleton II	Fr
FB	35	Joseph Bearns III	Fr
RB	36	Aeneas Smith	Fr
TE	47	Maxwell Brown	Fr
OL	50	Johari Branch	Sr
OL	51	Coltin Deery	Fr
OL	52	Keon Kindred	Fr
OL	54	Spencer Anderson	Sr
OL	55	Andre Roye Jr.	Fr
OL	57	Ja'Kavion Nonar	Fr
OL	60	Khristopher Love	So
OL	63	Clayton Allen	Fr
OL	64	Marcus Finger (injured)	Jr
OL	66	Aric Harris	Jr
OL	67	Tommy Varhall	Fr
OL	68	Sean Wilkins	So
OL	70	Amelio Moran	Sr
OL	71	Jaelyn Duncan	Sr
OL	72	Conor Fagan	So
OL	73	Bruno Onwuazor	So
OL	74	Delmar Glaze	So
OL	75	Ja'Khi Green	So
OL	76	Kyle Long	Fr
OL	77	Maximus McCree	So
OL	78	Mason Lunsford	Jr
TE	80	Terrance Ellis II	GS
WR	81	Kai Holloway	Fr
TE	82	Leron Husbands	Fr
TE	83	Joshua Jennings	Fr
TE	84	Corey Dyches	So
TE	85	Preston Howard	Fr
WR	86	Shane Carroll	Fr
WR	87	Robert Smith	Fr
WR	88	Khalid Jones	Fr

Defense

Pos.	#	Name	Class
DL	0	Greg China-Rose	Sr
LB	1	Jaishawn Barham	Fr
DB	2	Jakorian Bennett	Sr
DB	3	Deonte Banks	Jr
DB	4	Tarheeb Still	Jr
DL	5	Quashon Fuller	Jr
DB	6	Corey Coley Jr.	So
DB	7	Jayon Venerable	So
LB	8	Vandarius Cowan	Sr
LB	9	Fa'Najae Gotay	Sr
DL	10	Tyler Baylor	Sr
LB	11	Ruben Hyppolite II	Jr
DB	12	Dante Trader Jr.	So
DB	13	Glendon Miller	So
DB	14	Isaiah Hazel	Sr
DL	15	Riyad Wilmot	So
DB	17	Lionell Whitaker	Fr
LB	19	Ahmad McCullough	Sr
DB	20	Perry Fisher	Fr
LB	21	Gereme Spraggins	Sr
LB	22	Raymon Brown Jr.	Fr
DB	24	Chantz Harley	So
DB	25	Beau Brade	Jr
DB	26	Gavin Gibson	Fr
LB	29	Ian Maloney	Fr
LB	30	Durell Nchami	Sr
LB	31	Andrew Booker	Fr
DB	32	Shane Mosley	So
DL	33	Mosiah Nasili-Kite	Sr
DB	34	Lavain Scruggs	Fr
LB	35	Kobi Thomas	Sr
DB	36	Owura Berko	Jr
LB	37	Jordan Cannon	Fr
DL	39	Daniel Owens	Fr
DL	40	Taisze Johnson	So
DB	41	Rex Fleming	Jr
LB	42	Kameron Blount	Jr
LB	44	Caleb Wheatland	Fr
LB	45	Kellan Wyatt	Fr
LB	48	Terrance Butler Jr.	Fr
LB	49	David Brownlee	Sr
LB	50	Alex Simet	Sr
LB	51	Josh Morris	Jr
LB	53	Sean Greeley	Sr
DL	54	Ami Finau	Sr
DL	57	Isaac Bunyun	So
DL	88	Anthony Booker Jr.	Jr
DL	91	Christian Teague	Jr
DL	92	Henry Chibueze	Sr
DL	95	Austin Fontaine	Sr
DL	96	Zion Shockley	Fr
DL	99	Tommy Akingbesote	So

Special teams

Pos.	#	Name	Class
K	38	Chad Ryland	Sr
P	43	Brenden Segovia	Fr
LS	45	Jake Foggia	So
K	47	Harrison Beattie	So
LS	59	Ethan Gough	Fr
K/P	91	Jack Howes	Fr
P	98	Anthony Pecorella	Sr
P	99	Colton Spangler	Sr

Head coach

- Michael Locksley

Coordinators/assistant coaches

- Dan Enos (offensive coordinator/quarterbacks coach)
- Brian Williams (defensive coordinator/defensive line coach)
- Mike Miller (Co-offensive coordinator/tight ends coach)
- Gunter Brewer (wide receivers coach/passing game coordinator)
- Lance Thompson (Inside Linebackers Coach)
- Elijah Brooks (running backs coach)
- Henry Baker (Cornerbacks Coach)
- Brian Braswell (offensive line coach)
- Wes Neighbors (Safeties Coach)
- James Thomas Jr. (special teams coordinator/outside linebackers coach)

Legend

- (C) Team captain
- (S) Suspended
- (I) Ineligible
- Injured
- Redshirt

Roster

== Schedule ==
Date	Time	Opponent	Site	TV	Result	Attendance
September 3	12:00 p.m.	Buffalo*	Maryland Stadium; College Park, MD	BTN	W 31–10	30,223
September 10	3:30 p.m.	at Charlotte*	Jerry Richardson Stadium; Charlotte, NC	Stadium	W 56–21	12,614
September 17	7:30 p.m.	SMU*	Maryland Stadium; College Park, MD	FS1	W 34–27	31,194
September 24	12:00 p.m.	at No. 4 Michigan	Michigan Stadium; Ann Arbor, MI (Big Noon Kickoff)	FOX	L 27–34	110,225
October 1	3:30 p.m.	Michigan State	SECU Stadium (Note: Maryland Stadium was officially renamed to SECU Stadium on October 1, 2022.); College Park, MD	FS1	W 27–13	30,559
October 8	12:00 p.m.	Purdue	SECU Stadium; College Park, MD	BTN	L 29–31	36,204
October 15	3:30 p.m.	at Indiana	Memorial Stadium; Bloomington, IN	ESPN2	W 38–33	41,154
October 22	3:30 p.m.	Northwestern^{†}	SECU Stadium; College Park, MD	BTN	W 31–24	31,418
November 5	12:00 p.m.	at Wisconsin	Camp Randall Stadium; Madison, WI	BTN	L 10–23	74,057
November 12	3:30 p.m.	at No. 14 Penn State	Beaver Stadium; University Park, PA (rivalry)	FOX	L 0–30	108,796
November 19	3:30 p.m.	No. 2 Ohio State	SECU Stadium; College Park, MD	ABC	L 30–43	41,969
November 26	12:00 p.m.	Rutgers	SECU Stadium; College Park, MD	BTN	W 37–0	21,974
December 30	12:00 p.m.	vs. No. 23 NC State*	Bank of America Stadium; Charlotte, NC (Duke's Mayo Bowl)	ESPN	W 16–12	37,228
*Non-conference game; ^{†}Homecoming; Rankings from AP Poll (and CFP Rankings, after November 1) - Released prior to game; All times are in Eastern time

== Rankings ==
Ranking movements Legend: ██ Increase in ranking ██ Decrease in ranking — = Not ranked RV = Received votes
	Week															
Poll	Pre	1	2	3	4	5	6	7	8	9	10	11	12	13	14	Final
AP	—	—	—	—	—	RV	RV	RV	RV	RV	—	—	—	—	—	RV
Coaches	—	—	—	—	RV	RV	RV	RV	RV	RV	RV	—	—	—	—	RV
CFP	Not released									—	—	—	—	—	—	Not released

== Game summaries ==
=== vs. Buffalo ===
Buffalo Bulls (0-0) at Maryland Terrapins (0-0) - Game summary

Quarter	1	2	3	4	Total
Buffalo	0	7	0	3	10
Maryland	7	10	7	7	31

at SECU Stadium • College Park, MD

- Date: September 3
- Game time: 12:00 p.m. EST/9:00 a.m. PST
- Game weather: Sunny
- Game attendance: 30,223
- Referee: Jerry McGinn
- TV announcers (B1G Network): Lisa Byington (play-by-play), Anthony Herron (analyst), and Meghan McKeown (sideline)
- Box score

Game information

First quarter

- 12:24 MD - Roman Hemby 33-yard run (Chad Ryland kick) - 7-0 Maryland, Drive: 5 plays, 78 yards, 1:33

Second quarter

- 12:14 MD - Antwain Littleton II 2-yard run (Chad Ryland kick) - 14-0 Maryland, Drive: 3 plays, 31 yards, 1:06
- 6:30 MD - Chad Ryland 45-yard field goal - 17-0 Maryland, Drive: 6 plays, 54 yards, 2:38
- 3:03 BUF - Al-Jay Henderson 19-yard run (Alex McNulty kick) - 17-7 Maryland, Drive: 9 plays, 75 yards, 3:27

Third quarter

- 14:21 MD - Roman Hemby 70-yard run (Chad Ryland kick) - 24-7 Maryland, Drive: 2 plays, 75 yards, 0:39

Fourth quarter

- 13:49 MD - Antwain Littleton II 1-yard run (Chad Ryland kick) - 31-7 Maryland, Drive: 11 plays, 79 yards, 4:17
- 6:07 BUF - Alex McNulty 34-yard field goal - 31-10 Maryland, Drive: 11 plays, 80 yards, 4:12

Statistics	Buffalo	Maryland
First downs	18	16
Plays–yards	73–268	61–446
Rushes–yards	38–108	26–149
Passing yards	160	297
Passing: comp–att–int	18–35–0	25–35–1
Time of possession	32:37	27:23

Team	Category	Player	Statistics
Buffalo	Passing	Cole Snyder	18/35, 160 yards
Buffalo	Rushing	Ron Cook	15 carries, 33 yards
Buffalo	Receiving	Justin Marshall	4 receptions, 52 yards
Maryland	Passing	Taulia Tagovailoa	24/34, 290 yards, 1 INT
Maryland	Rushing	Roman Hemby	7 carries, 114 yards, 2 TD
Maryland	Receiving	Rakim Jarrett	6 receptions, 110 yards

=== at Charlotte ===
Maryland Terrapins (1-0) at Charlotte 49ers (0-2) - Game summary

Quarter	1	2	3	4	Total
Maryland	21	14	14	7	56
Charlotte	7	7	0	7	21

at Jerry Richardson Stadium • Charlotte, NC

- Date: September 10
- Game time: 3:30 p.m. EST/12:30 p.m. PST
- Game weather: Rainy • Temperature: 69 °F (21 °C)
- Game attendance: 12,614
- Referee: Ron Snodgrass
- TV announcers (Stadium): Chris Hassel (play-by-play) and Patrick Murray (analyst)
- Box score

Game information

First quarter

- 13:10 MD - Jacob Copeland 39-yard pass from Taulia Tagovailoa (Chad Ryland kick) - 7-0 Maryland, Drive: 5 plays, 79 yards, 1:50
- 5:58 CHAR - Grant DuBose 11-yard pass from Xavier Williams (Antonio Zita kick) - 7-7, Drive: 16 plays, 67 yards, 7:12
- 5:28 MD - Jeshaun Jones 14-yard pass from Taulia Tagovailoa (Chad Ryland kick) - 14-7 Maryland, Drive: 3 plays, 31 yards, 0:30
- 1:18 MD - Antwain Littleton II 59-yard run (Chad Ryland kick) - 21-7 Maryland, Drive: 3 plays, 92 yards, 0:47

Second quarter

- 14:25 CHAR - Victor Tucker 19-yard pass from Xavier Williams (Antonio Zita kick) - 21-14 Maryland, Drive: 4 plays, 80 yards, 1:53
- 12:55 MD - Jacob Copeland 45-yard pass from Taulia Tagovailoa (Chad Ryland kick) - 28-14 Maryland, Drive: 4 plays, 75 yards, 1:30
- 4:47 MD - Jeshaun Jones 16-yard pass from Taulia Tagovailoa (Chad Ryland kick) - 35-14 Maryland, Drive: 11 plays, 81 yards, 6:39

Third quarter

- 6:48 MD - Taulia Tagovailoa 4-yard run (Chad Ryland kick) - 42-14 Maryland, Drive: 15 plays, 83 yards, 7:29
- 3:28 MD - Colby McDonald 49-yard run (Chad Ryland kick) - 49-14 Maryland, Drive: 2 plays, 57 yards, 0:49

Fourth quarter

- 12:55 MD - Octavian Smith Jr. 17-yard pass from Billy Edwards Jr. (Chad Ryland kick) - 56-14 Maryland, Drive: 6 plays, 50 yards, 2:37
- 7:49 CHAR - Victor Tucker 5-yard pass from Trexler Ivey (Antonio Zita kick) - 56-21 Maryland, Drive: 12 plays, 76 yards, 5:06

Statistics	Maryland	Charlotte
First downs	26	24
Plays–yards	62–612	80–388
Rushes–yards	28-193	28-96
Passing yards	419	292
Passing: comp–att–int	30–34–1	28–52–0
Time of possession	28:46	31:14

Team	Category	Player	Statistics
Maryland	Passing	Taulia Tagovailoa	27/31, 391 yards, 4 TD, 1 INT
Maryland	Rushing	Colby McDonald	4 carries, 61 yards, 1 TD
Maryland	Receiving	Jacob Copeland	4 receptions, 110 yards, 2 TD
Charlotte	Passing	Xavier Williams	19/35, 191 yards, 2 TD
Charlotte	Rushing	Shadrick Byrd	11 carries, 38 yards
Charlotte	Receiving	Elijah Spencer	4 receptions, 98 yards

=== vs. SMU ===
SMU Mustangs (2-0) at Maryland Terrapins (2-0) - Game summary

Quarter	1	2	3	4	Total
SMU	6	14	7	0	27
Maryland	3	14	3	14	34

at SECU Stadium • College Park, MD

- Date: September 17
- Game time: 7:30 p.m. EST/4:30 p.m. PST
- Game weather: Cloudy • Temperature: 73 °F (23 °C) • Wind: 5 mph SE
- Game attendance: 31,194
- Referee: Mark Kluczynski
- TV announcers (FS1): Eric Collins (play-by-play) and Devin Gardner (analyst)
- Box score

Game information

First quarter

- 8:26 MD - Chad Ryland 36-yard field goal - 3-0 Maryland, Drive: 6 plays, 74 yards, 3:24
- 4:37 SMU - Collin Rogers 27-yard field goal - 3-3, Drive: 11 plays, 65 yards, 3:49
- 3:26 SMU - Collin Rogers 43-yard field goal - 6-3 SMU, Drive: 4 plays, 4 yards, 1:04

Second quarter

- 14:53 SMU - RJ Maryland 51-yard pass from Tanner Mordecai (Collin Rogers kick) - 13-3 SMU, Drive: 7 plays, 75 yards, 2:19
- 5:43 MD - Antwain Littleton II 1-yard run (Chad Ryland kick) - 13-10 SMU, Drive: 11 plays, 65 yards, 4:58
- 4:30 MD - Rakim Jarrett 48-yard pass from Taulia Tagovailoa (Chad Ryland kick) - 17-13 Maryland, Drive: 1 play, 48 yards, 0:09
- 2:42 SMU - Austin Upshaw 13-yard pass from Tanner Mordecai (Collin Rogers kick) - 20-17 SMU, Drive: 7 plays, 75 yards, 1:48

Third quarter

- 11:34 MD - Chad Ryland 41-yard field goal - 20-20, Drive: 7 plays, 35 yards, 3:20
- 6:42 SMU - Kelvontay Dixon 7-yard pass from Tanner Mordecai (Collin Rogers kick) - 27-20 SMU, Drive: 6 plays, 37 yards, 1:35

Fourth quarter

- 14:29 MD - Roman Hemby 1-yard run (Chad Ryland kick) - 27-27, Drive: 9 plays, 68 yards, 3:22
- 7:30 MD - Corey Dyches 5-yard pass from Taulia Tagovailoa (Chad Ryland kick) - 34-27 Maryland, Drive: 10 plays, 46 yards, 4:40

Statistics	SMU	Maryland
First downs	30	16
Plays–yards	96–520	61–439
Rushes–yards	42–151	38–225
Passing yards	369	214
Passing: comp–att–int	29–54–2	17-23–0
Time of possession	31:23	28:37

Team	Category	Player	Statistics
SMU	Passing	Tanner Mordecai	29/54, 369 yards, 3 TD, 2 INT
SMU	Rushing	Tre Siggers	19 carries, 86 yards
SMU	Receiving	Rashee Rice	11 receptions, 193 yards
Maryland	Passing	Taulia Tagovailoa	17/23, 214 yards, 2 TD
Maryland	Rushing	Roman Hemby	16 carries, 151 yards, 1 TD
Maryland	Receiving	Rakim Jarrett	2 receptions, 65 yards, 1 TD

=== at No. 4 Michigan (Big Noon Kickoff) ===
Maryland Terrapins (3-0) at No. 4 Michigan Wolverines (3-0) - Game summary

Quarter	1	2	3	4	Total
Maryland	10	3	0	14	27
No. 4 Michigan	10	7	0	17	34

at Michigan Stadium • Ann Arbor, MI

- Date: September 24
- Game time: 12:00 p.m. EST/9:00 a.m. PST
- Game weather: Cloudy • Temperature: 61 °F (16 °C) • Wind: 5 mph S
- Game attendance: 110,225
- Referee: Greg Blum
- TV announcers (FOX): Gus Johnson (play-by-play), Joel Klatt (analyst), and Jenny Taft (sideline)
- Box score

Game information

First quarter

- 14:52 MICH - Luke Schoonmaker 10-yard pass from J. J. McCarthy (Jake Moody kick) - 7-0 Michigan, Drive: 1 play, 10 yards, 0:05
- 12:25 MD - Chad Ryland 53-yard field goal - 7-3 Michigan, Drive: 8 plays, 40 yards, 2:27
- 8:10 MICH - Jake Moody 52-yard field goal - 10-3 Michigan, Drive: 10 plays, 41 yards, 4:15
- 2:22 MD - Antwain Littleton II 2-yard run (Chad Ryland kick) - 10-10, Drive: 13 plays, 75 yards, 5:48

Second quarter

- 13:15 MD - Chad Ryland 52-yard field goal - 13-10 Maryland, Drive: 6 plays, 39 yards, 2:05
- 0:22 MICH - Blake Corum 33-yard run (Jake Moody kick) - 17-13 Michigan, Drive: 8 plays, 70 yards, 1:14

Fourth quarter

- 14:16 MICH - Roman Wilson 20-yard pass from J. J. McCarthy (Jake Moody kick) - 24-13 Michigan, Drive: 10 plays, 85 yards, 4:45
- 9:10 MD - Tai Felton 4-yard pass from Taulia Tagovailoa (Taulia Tagovailoa two-point pass incomplete) - 24-19 Michigan, Drive: 10 plays, 75 yards, 5:06
- 6:28 MICH - Jake Moody 38-yard field goal - 27-19 Michigan, Drive: 7 plays, 55 yards, 2:42
- 3:31 MICH - Blake Corum 47-yard run (Jake Moody kick) - 34-19 Michigan, Drive: 5 plays, 65 yards, 2:24
- 0:45 MD - CJ Dippre 18-yard pass from Billy Edwards Jr. (Billy Edwards Jr. two-point pass complete to Jeshaun Jones) - 34-27 Michigan, Drive: 14 plays, 75 yards, 2:46

Statistics	Maryland	No. 4 Michigan
First downs	23	22
Plays–yards	73–397	66–463
Rushes–yards	34–128	40–243
Passing yards	269	220
Passing: comp–att–int	25–39–2	18–26–0
Time of possession	28:10	31:50

Team	Category	Player	Statistics
Maryland	Passing	Taulia Tagovailoa	20/30, 207 yards, 1 TD, 2 INT
Maryland	Rushing	Roman Hemby	16 carries, 48 yards
Maryland	Receiving	Corey Dyches	3 receptions, 60 yards
No. 4 Michigan	Passing	J. J. McCarthy	18/26, 220 yards, 2 TD
No. 4 Michigan	Rushing	Blake Corum	30 carries, 243 yards, 2 TD
No. 4 Michigan	Receiving	Luke Schoonmaker	7 receptions, 72 yards, 1 TD

=== vs. Michigan State ===
Michigan State Spartans (2-2) at Maryland Terrapins (3-1) - Game summary

Quarter	1	2	3	4	Total
Michigan State	7	6	0	0	13
Maryland	14	7	3	3	27

at SECU Stadium • College Park, MD

- Date: October 1
- Game time: 3:30 p.m. EST/12:30 p.m. PST
- Game weather: Cloudy • Temperature: 55 °F (13 °C)
- Game attendance: 30,559
- Referee: Larry Smith
- TV announcers (FS1): Noah Eagle (play-by-play) and Mark Helfrich (analyst)
- Box score

Game information

First quarter

- 9:15 MD - Antwain Littleton II 15-yard run (Chad Ryland kick) - 7-0 Maryland, Drive: 12 plays, 93 yards, 5:45
- 5:45 MSU - Elijah Collins 12-yard run (Ben Patton kick) - 7-7, Drive: 8 plays, 77 yards, 3:25
- 3:41 MD - Colby McDonald 2-yard run (Chad Ryland kick) - 14-7 Maryland, Drive: 5 plays, 85 yards, 2:01

Second quarter

- 4:24 MSU - Jayden Reed 8-yard pass from Payton Thorne (PAT no good, botched snap) - 14-13 Maryland, Drive: 13 plays, 80 yards, 3:37
- 0:42 MD - Rakim Jarrett 5-yard pass from Taulia Tagovailoa (Chad Ryland kick) - 21-13 Maryland, Drive: 13 plays, 80 yards, 3:37

Third quarter

- 8:26 MD - Chad Ryland 43-yard field goal - 24-13 Maryland, Drive: 11 plays, 43 yards, 5:42

Fourth quarter

- 7:54 MD - Chad Ryland 51-yard field goal - 27-13 Maryland, Drive: 6 plays, 19 yards, 3:00

Statistics	Michigan State	Maryland
First downs	22	24
Plays–yards	66–321	76–489
Rushes–yards	22–100	35–175
Passing yards	221	314
Passing: comp–att–int	27–44–0	32-41-0
Time of possession	23:44	36:16

Team	Category	Player	Statistics
Michigan State	Passing	Payton Thorne	27/44, 221 yards, 1 TD
Michigan State	Rushing	Elijah Collins	5 carries, 36 yards, 1 TD
Michigan State	Receiving	Jayden Reed	7 receptions, 61 yards, 1 TD
Maryland	Passing	Taulia Tagovailoa	32/41, 314 yards, 1 TD
Maryland	Rushing	Antwain Littleton II	19 carries, 120 yards, 1 TD
Maryland	Receiving	Jeshaun Jones	6 receptions, 60 yards

=== vs. Purdue ===
Purdue Boilermakers (3-2) at Maryland Terrapins (4-1) - Game summary

Quarter	1	2	3	4	Total
Purdue	3	14	0	14	31
Maryland	7	10	0	12	29

at SECU Stadium • College Park, MD

- Date: October 8
- Game time: 12:00 p.m. EST/9:00 a.m. PST
- Game weather: Sunny • Temperature: 63 °F (17 °C) • Wind: 8 mph SE
- Game attendance: 36,204
- Referee: Reggie Smith
- TV announcers (BTN): Lisa Byington (play-by-play), Anthony Herron (analyst), and Meghan McKeown (sideline)
- Box score

Game information

First quarter

- 10:31 MD - Taulia Tagovailoa 9-yard run (Chad Ryland kick) - 7-0 Maryland, Drive: 6 plays, 69 yards, 2:24
- 4:50 PUR - Mitchell Fineran 39-yard field goal - 7-3 Maryland, Drive: 12 plays, 53 yards, 5:41

Second quarter

- 14:04 PUR - Dylan Downing 1-yard run (Mitchell Fineran kick) - 10-7 Purdue, Drive: 11 plays, 65 yards, 4:48
- 10:22 MD - Chad Ryland 46-yard field goal - 10-10, Drive: 8 plays, 52 yards, 3:35
- 6:16 PUR - Mershawn Rice 4-yard pass from Aidan O'Connell (Mitchell Fineran kick) - 17-10 Purdue, Drive: 10 plays, 75 yards, 4:06
- 0:14 MD - Corey Dyches 68-yard pass from Taulia Tagovailoa (Chad Ryland kick) - 17-17, Drive: 1 play, 53 yards, 0:27

Fourth quarter

- 7:47 MD - Roman Hemby 11-yard pass from Taulia Tagovailoa (Chad Ryland kick blocked) - 23-17 Maryland, Drive: 12 plays, 69 yards, 4:19
- 3:19 PUR - Payne Durham 4-yard pass from Aidan O'Connell (Mitchell Fineran kick) - 24-23 Purdue, Drive: 10 plays, 66 yards, 4:21
- 1:20 PUR - Devin Mockobee 1-yard run (Mitchell Fineran kick) - 31-23 Purdue, Drive: 5 plays, 60 yards, 1:10
- 0:35 MD - Corey Dyches 18-yard pass from Taulia Tagovailoa (Taulia Tagovailoa two-point pass incomplete) - 31-29 Purdue, Drive: 4 plays, 68 yards, 0:37

Statistics	Purdue	Maryland
First downs	23	18
Plays–yards	75–373	63–387
Rushes–yards	34–13	25–72
Passing yards	360	315
Passing: comp–att–int	30–41–1	26–38–1
Time of possession	32:11	27:49

Team	Category	Player	Statistics
Purdue	Passing	Aidan O'Connell	30/41, 360 yards, 2 TD, 1 INT
Purdue	Rushing	Devin Mockobee	13 carries, 29 yards, 1 TD
Purdue	Receiving	Payne Durham	7 receptions, 109 yards, 1 TD
Maryland	Passing	Taulia Tagovailoa	26/38, 315 yards, 3 TD, 1 INT
Maryland	Rushing	Antwain Littleton II	6 carries, 30 yards
Maryland	Receiving	Corey Dyches	4 receptions, 106 yards, 2 TD

=== at Indiana ===
Maryland Terrapins (4-2) at Indiana Hoosiers (3-3) - Game summary

Quarter	1	2	3	4	Total
Maryland	7	7	10	14	38
Indiana	3	14	3	13	33

at Memorial Stadium • Bloomington, IN

- Date: October 15
- Game time: 3:30 p.m. EST/12:30 p.m. PST
- Game weather: Sunny • Temperature: 57 °F (14 °C) • Wind: 8 mph W
- Game attendance: 41,154
- Referee: Jeffrey Servinski
- TV announcers (ESPN2): Anish Shroff (play-by-play), Brock Osweiler (analyst), and Taylor McGregor (sideline)
- Box score

Game information

First quarter

- 13:03 MD - Taulia Tagovailoa 3-yard run (Chad Ryland kick) - 7-0 Maryland, Drive: 4 plays, 29 yards, 1:51
- 8:53 IND - Charles Campbell 38-yard field goal - 7-3 Maryland, Drive: 11 plays, 55 yards, 4:10

Second quarter

- 14:49 MD - CJ Dippre 18-yard pass from Taulia Tagovailoa (Chad Ryland kick) - 14-3 Maryland, Drive: 8 plays, 71 yards, 4:10
- 9:52 IND - Josh Henderson 44-yard pass from Connor Bazelak (Charles Campbell kick) - 14-10 Maryland, Drive: 8 plays, 67 yards, 2:44
- 1:47 IND - Cam Camper 3-yard pass from Connor Bazelak (Charles Campbell kick) - 17-14 Indiana, Drive: 11 plays, 80 yards, 3:20

Third quarter

- 13:23 MD - Dontay Demus Jr. 17-yard pass from Taulia Tagovailoa (Chad Ryland kick) - 21-17 Maryland, Drive: 4 plays, 45 yards, 1:28
- 8:52 MD - Chad Ryland 36-yard field goal - 24-17 Maryland, Drive: 10 plays, 36 yards, 4:25
- 3:16 IND - Charles Campbell 26-yard field goal - 24-20 Maryland, Drive: 17 plays, 57 yards, 5:36

Fourth quarter

- 14:09 IND - Josh Henderson 2-yard run (Charles Campbell kick) - 27-24 Indiana, Drive: 7 plays, 58 yards, 2:40
- 5:35 MD - Roman Hemby 6-yard run (Chad Ryland kick) - 31-27 Maryland, Drive: 7 plays, 61 yards, 2:30
- 2:11 MD - Billy Edwards Jr. 3-yard run (Chad Ryland kick) - 38-27 Maryland, Drive: 7 plays, 62 yards, 2:51
- 0:54 IND - Aaron Steinfeldt 3-yard pass from Connor Bazelak (Connor Bazelak two-point pass incomplete) - 38-33 Maryland, Drive: 8 plays, 75 yards, 1:17

Statistics	Maryland	Indiana
First downs	25	23
Plays–yards	82–442	75–351
Rushes–yards	40–172	32–36
Passing yards	270	315
Passing: comp–att–int	25–42–0	30–43–2
Time of possession	34:44	25:16

Team	Category	Player	Statistics
Maryland	Passing	Taulia Tagovailoa	25/39, 270 yards, 2 TD
Maryland	Rushing	Roman Hemby	17 carries, 107 yards, 1 TD
Maryland	Receiving	Jacob Copeland	4 receptions, 62 yards
Indiana	Passing	Connor Bazelak	29/42, 292 yards, 3 TD, 2 INT
Indiana	Rushing	Shaun Shivers	14 carries, 32 yards
Indiana	Receiving	Emery Simmons	6 receptions, 99 yards

=== vs. Northwestern ===
Northwestern Wildcats (1-5) at Maryland Terrapins (5-2) - Game summary

Quarter	1	2	3	4	Total
Northwestern	7	10	0	7	24
Maryland	0	10	14	7	31

at SECU Stadium • College Park, MD

- Date: October 22
- Game time: 3:30 p.m. EST/12:30 p.m. PST
- Game weather: Sunny • Temperature: 68 °F (20 °C) • Wind: 3 mph SW
- Game attendance: 31,418
- Referee: Michael Cannon
- TV announcers (BTN): Brandon Gaudin (play-by-play), Jake Butt (analyst), and Rick Pizzo (sideline)
- Box score

Game information

First quarter

- 2:54 NW - Brendan Sullivan 1-yard run (Adam Stage kick) - 7-0 Northwestern, Drive: 3 plays, 50 yards, 0:48

Second quarter

- 13:43 MD - Roman Hemby 14-yard run (Chad Ryland kick) - 7-7, Drive: 12 plays, 87 yards, 4:06
- 10:25 NW - Adam Stage 24-yard field goal - 10-7 Northwestern, Drive: 8 plays, 68 yards, 3:18
- 4:50 NW - Evan Hull 10-yard pass from Brendan Sullivan (Adam Stage kick) - 17-7 Northwestern, Drive: 12 plays, 83 yards, 4:12
- 0:08 MD - Chad Ryland 20-yard field goal - 17-10 Northwestern, Drive: 16 plays, 86 yards, 4:40

Third quarter

- 10:21 MD - Roman Hemby 18-yard run (Chad Ryland kick) - 17-17, Drive: 8 plays, 54 yards, 2:54
- 1:07 MD - Rakim Jarrett 30-yard pass from Billy Edwards Jr. (Chad Ryland kick) - 24-17 Maryland, Drive: 9 plays, 65 yards, 4:33

Fourth quarter

- 3:34 NW - Andrew Clair 9-yard run (Adam Stage kick) - 24-24, Drive: 9 plays, 72 yards, 2:50
- 3:22 MD - Roman Hemby 75-yard run (Chad Ryland kick) - 31-24 Maryland, Drive: 1 play, 75 yards, 0:12

Statistics	Northwestern	Maryland
First downs	24	25
Plays–yards	70–358	78–423
Rushes–yards	46–215	50–257
Passing yards	143	166
Passing: comp–att–int	18–24–2	18–28–0
Time of possession	27:10	32:50

Team	Category	Player	Statistics
Northwestern	Passing	Brendan Sullivan	18/24, 143 yards, 1 TD, 2 INT
Northwestern	Rushing	Evan Hull	20 carries, 119 yards
Northwestern	Receiving	Malik Washington	6 receptions, 72 yards
Maryland	Passing	Billy Edwards Jr.	18/28, 166 yards, 1 TD
Maryland	Rushing	Roman Hemby	24 carries, 179 yards, 2 TD
Maryland	Receiving	Rakim Jarrett	8 receptions, 82 yards, 1 TD

=== at Wisconsin ===
Maryland Terrapins (6-2) at Wisconsin Badgers (4-4) - Game summary

Quarter	1	2	3	4	Total
Maryland	0	0	3	7	10
Wisconsin	7	10	3	3	23

at Camp Randall Stadium • Madison, WI

- Date: November 5
- Game time: 12:00 p.m. EST/9:00 a.m. PST
- Game weather: Rainy • Temperature: 60 °F (16 °C) • Wind: 20 mph S
- Game attendance: 74,057
- Referee: Jerry McGinn
- TV announcers (BTN): Jeff Levering (play-by-play), Anthony Herron (analyst), and Meghan McKeown (sideline)
- Box score

Game information

First quarter

- 1:21 WISC - Braelon Allen 9-yard run (Nate Van Zelst kick) - 7-0 Wisconsin, Drive: 12 plays, 77 yards, 6:01

Second quarter

- 10:16 WISC - Isaac Guerendo 89-yard run (Nate Van Zelst kick) - 14-0 Wisconsin, Drive: 1 play, 89 yards, 0:13
- 0:09 WISC - Nate Van Zelst 38-yard field goal - 17-0 Wisconsin, Drive: 10 plays, 48 yards, 1:58

Third quarter

- 7:29 MD - Chad Ryland 39-yard field goal - 17-3 Wisconsin, Drive: 12 plays, 43 yards, 5:52
- 0:08 WISC - Nate Van Zelst 35-yard field goal - 20-3 Wisconsin, Drive: 8 plays, 48 yards, 4:46

Fourth quarter

- 6:33 WISC - Nate Van Zelst 28-yard field goal - 23-3 Wisconsin, Drive: 6 plays, 44 yards, 3:15
- 0:57 MD - Tai Felton 5-yard pass from Taulia Tagovailoa (Chad Ryland kick) - 23-10 Wisconsin, Drive: 13 plays, 73 yards, 5:31

Statistics	Maryland	Wisconsin
First downs	9	15
Plays–yards	64–189	64–355
Rushes–yards	41–112	46–278
Passing yards	77	77
Passing: comp–att–int	10–23–1	5–18–0
Time of possession	30:36	29:24

Team	Category	Player	Statistics
Maryland	Passing	Taulia Tagovailoa	10/23, 77 yards, 1 TD, 1 INT
Maryland	Rushing	Roman Hemby	16 carries, 66 yards
Maryland	Receiving	CJ Dippre	2 receptions, 36 yards
Wisconsin	Passing	Graham Mertz	5/18, 77 yards
Wisconsin	Rushing	Braelon Allen	23 carries, 119 yards, 1 TD
Wisconsin	Receiving	Chimere Dike	3 receptions, 32 yards

=== at No. 14 Penn State ===
Maryland Terrapins (6-3) at No. 14 Penn State Nittany Lions (7-2) - Game summary

Quarter	1	2	3	4	Total
Maryland	0	0	0	0	0
No. 14 Penn State	14	13	3	0	30

at Beaver Stadium • University Park, PA

- Date: November 12
- Game time: 3:30 p.m. EST/12:30 p.m. PST
- Game weather: Rainy • Temperature: 51 °F (11 °C) • Wind: 10 mph NE
- Game attendance: 108,796
- Referee: Mark Kluczynski
- TV announcers (FOX): Tim Brando (play-by-play) and Spencer Tillman (analyst)
- Box score

Game information

First quarter

- 8:52 PSU - Brenton Strange 3-yard pass from Sean Clifford (Jake Pinegar kick) - 7-0 Penn State, Drive: 9 plays, 47 yards, 4:28
- 1:25 PSU - Nicholas Singleton 45-yard run (Jake Pinegar kick) - 14-0 Penn State, Drive: 6 plays, 64 yards, 3:30

Second quarter

- 7:46 PSU - Nicholas Singleton 27-yard run (Jake Pinegar kick) - 21-0 Penn State, Drive: 7 plays, 72 yards, 3:51
- 1:34 PSU - Jake Pinegar 50-yard field goal - 24-0 Penn State, Drive: 11 plays, 35 yards, 3:41
- 0:00 PSU - Jake Pinegar 46-yard field goal - 27-0 Penn State, Drive: 7 plays, 48 yards, 1:09

Third quarter

- 8:15 PSU - Jake Pinegar 21-yard field goal - 30-0 Penn State, Drive: 8 plays, 61 yards, 3:46

Statistics	Maryland	No. 14 Penn State
First downs	11	21
Plays–yards	60-134	73-413
Rushes–yards	37-60	43–249
Passing yards	74	164
Passing: comp–att–int	11–23–0	16–30–0
Time of possession	25:14	34:46

Team	Category	Player	Statistics
Maryland	Passing	Taulia Tagovailoa	11/22, 74 yards
Maryland	Rushing	Roman Hemby	13 carries, 68 yards
Maryland	Receiving	Rakim Jarrett	3 receptions, 30 yards
No. 14 Penn State	Passing	Sean Clifford	12/23, 139 yards, 1 TD
No. 14 Penn State	Rushing	Nicholas Singleton	11 carries, 122 yards, 2 TD
No. 14 Penn State	Receiving	Theo Johnson	3 receptions, 44 yards

=== No. 2 Ohio State ===
No. 2 Ohio State Buckeyes (10-0) at Maryland Terrapins (6-4) – Game summary

Quarter	1	2	3	4	Total
Maryland	6	7	0	17	30
No. 2 Ohio State	7	3	17	16	43

at SECU Stadium, College Park, Maryland

- Date: November 19
- Game time: 3:30 p.m. EST/12:30 p.m. PST
- Game weather: Cloudy, 45 °F (7 °C)
- Game attendance: 41,969
- Referee: Ron Snodgrass
- TV announcers (ABC): Joe Tessitore (play-by-play), Greg McElroy (analyst), and Katie George (sideline reporter)
- Spread: Ohio State –26 • Odds to win: Ohio State 90.3% •

Game information

First quarter

- OSU – 13:28 T.J. Henderson 31 yard pass from C. J. Stroud (Noah Ruggles kick) - Ohio State 7–0, Drive: 6 plays, 75 yards, 1:32
- MD – 8:47 Chad Ryland kicks a 31 yard Field Goal – Ohio State 7–3, Drive: 9 plays, 61 yards, 4:41
- MD – 3:52 Chad Ryland kicks a 21 yard Field Goal – Ohio State 7–6, Drive: 8 plays, 54 yards, 3:58

Second quarter

- OSU – 10:02 Noah Ruggles kicks a 33 yard Field Goal – Ohio State 10–6, Drive: 14 plays, 75 yards, 4:59
- MD – 3:52 CJ Dippre 1 yard pass from Taulia Tagovailoa (Chad Ryland kick) – Maryland 13–10, Drive: 14 plays, 75 yards, 6:10

Third quarter

- OSU – 12:13 Dallan Hayden runs for 8 yard TD (Noah Ruggles kick) – Ohio State 17–13, Drive: 2 plays, 14 yards, 0:23
- OSU – 7:52 Noah Ruggles kicks a 47 yard Field Goal – Ohio State 20–13, Drive: 9 plays, 35 yards, 3:04
- OSU – 0:16 Dallan Hayden runs for a yard Run (Noah Ruggles kick) – Ohio State 27–13, Drive: 11 plays, 88 yards, 5:08

Fourth quarter

- MD – 13:53 Taulia Tagovailoa runs for 5 yard TD (Jacob Copeland catches Taulia Tagovailoa pass for Two-Point Conversion) – Ohio State 27–21, Drive: 5 plays, 75 yards, 1:23
- OSU – 12:36 Dallan Hayden runs for 13 Yard TD (Noah Ruggles PAT is blocked) – Ohio State 33–21, Drive: 4 plays, 53 yards, 1:17
- MD – 12:36 D2P Jakorian Bennett scores a Defensive PAT Conversion – Ohio State 33–23, Drive: 4 plays, 53 yards, 1:17
- MD – 9:49 Taulia Tagovailoa 1 yard pass to Jashaun Jones (Chad Ryland kick) – Ohio State 33–30, Drive: 7 plays, 74 yards, 2:47
- OSU – 0:42 Noah Ruggles kicks a 45 Yd Field Goal – Ohio State 36–30, Drive: 11 plays, 61 yards, 5:12
- OSU – 0:09 Steele Chambers returns a 1 Yd fumble for a TD (Noah Ruggles kick) – Ohio State 43–30, Drive: 2 plays, -15 yards, 0:33

Statistics	No. 2 Ohio State	Maryland
First downs	26	20
Plays–yards	73–401	68–402
Rushes–yards	43–160	31–84
Passing yards	241	318
Passing: comp–att–int	18–30–0	27–37–0
Time of possession	30:15	29:45

Team	Category	Player	Statistics
No. 2 Ohio State	Passing	C. J. Stroud	18-30, 241 yards, 1 TD
No. 2 Ohio State	Rushing	Dallan Hayden	27 carries, 146 yards, 3 TD
No. 2 Ohio State	Receiving	Emeka Egbuka	6 receptions, 82 yards, 0 TD
Maryland	Passing	Taulia Tagovailoa	26-36, 293 yards, 2 TD
Maryland	Rushing	Roman Hemby	11 carries, 39 yards, 0 TD
Maryland	Receiving	Dontay Demus	5 receptions, 67 yards, 0 TD

=== Rutgers ===
	1	2	3	4	Total
Scarlet Knights	0	0	0	0	0
Terrapins	0	17	13	7	37

=== Vs. No. 23 NC State (Duke's Mayo Bowl) ===
Of some note, Gary Hahn, a radio broadcaster for this bowl game, was suspended indefinitely after making a remark about "illegal aliens in El Paso" while sharing score updates from around the country.

No. 23 NC State vs Maryland

Team	1	2	3	4	Total
• Terrapins	3	7	3	3	16
No. 23 Wolfpack	3	6	0	3	12

- Date: December 30, 2022
- Location: Bank of America Stadium
  Charlotte, NC
- Game start: Noon EST
- Game attendance: 37,228
- Game weather: Cloudy • Temperature: 58 °F (14 °C) • Wind: 1 mph (1.6 km/h) east
- Referee: Mike McCabe
- TV announcers (ESPN/ESPN Radio): Anish Shroff (play–by–play), Brock Osweiler (analyst), Andraya Carter (sideline)/Bill Roth (play-by-play), Charles Arbuckle (analyst), and Dana Boyle (sideline)
- Source: Box score

Scoring summary
1	6:10	NCSU	Christopher Dunn 38-yard field goal (7 plays, 59 yards, 2:53)	NCSU 3–0
1	3:24	UMD	Chad Ryland 42-yard field goal (5 plays, 29 yards, 2:46)	TIED 3–3
2	8:07	UMD	Octavian Smith Jr. 19-yard touchdown reception from Taulia Tagovailoa (Chad Ryland kick) (8 plays, 68 yards, 3:33)	UMD 10–3
2	4:37	NCSU	Christopher Dunn 19-yard field goal (11 plays, 73 yards, 3:30)	UMD 10–6
2	0:14	NCSU	Christopher Dunn 38-yard field goal (7 plays, 32 yards, 0:58)	UMD 10–9
3	8:06	UMD	Chad Ryland 33-yard field goal (12 plays, 59 yards, 4:52)	UMD 13–9
4	9:23	NCSU	Christopher Dunn 26-yard field goal (5 plays, 26 yards, 1:50)	UMD 13–12
4	5:36	UMD	Chad Ryland 45-yard field goal (10 plays, 48 yards, 3:47)	UMD 16–12

Statistics	UMD	NCSU
First downs	17	13
Total yards	342	296
Rushing yards	76	27
Passing yards	266	269
Turnovers	2	2
Time of possession	35:34	24:26

Team	Category	Player	Statistics
Maryland	Passing	Taulia Tagovailoa	19/37, 221 yards, TD, 2 INT
Maryland	Rushing	Roman Hemby	24 carries, 65 yards
Maryland	Receiving	Jeshaun Jones	4 receptions, 79 yards
NC State	Passing	Ben Finley	22/48, 269 yards, 2 INT
NC State	Rushing	Jordan Houston	9 carries, 14 yards
NC State	Receiving	Thayer Thomas	4 receptions, 54 yards

== Players drafted into the NFL ==
Round	Pick	Player	Position	NFL club
1	24	Deonte Banks	CB	New York Giants
4	104	Jakorian Bennett	CB	Las Vegas Raiders
4	112	Chad Ryland	K	New England Patriots
6	186	Jaelyn Duncan	OT	Tennessee Titans
7	251	Spencer Anderson	OG	Pittsburgh Steelers
