= Jacob Copeland =

American football player (born 1999)

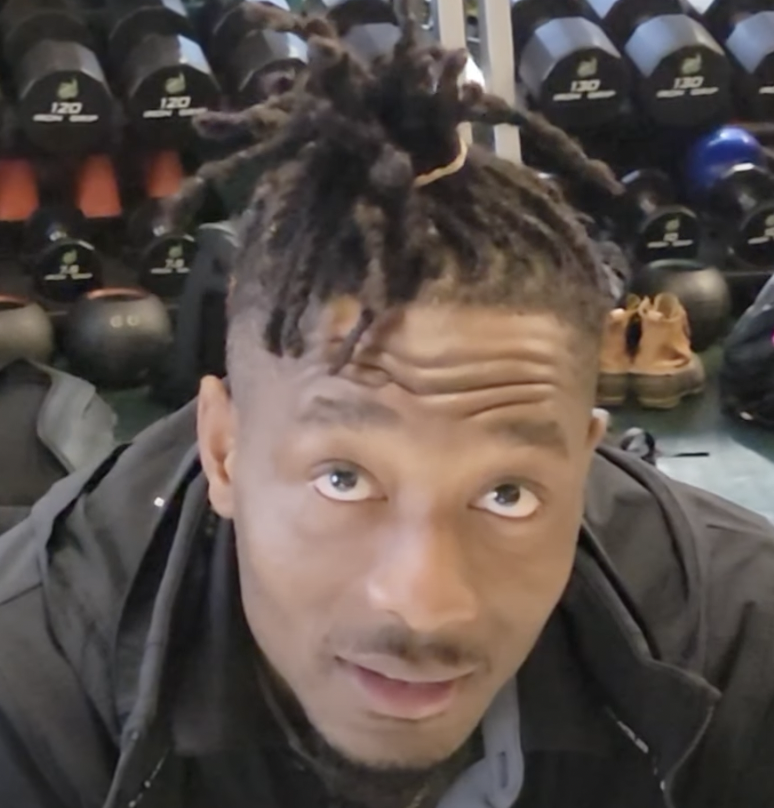
- Copeland in 2022

No. 10
- Position: Wide receiver

Personal information
- Born: July 20, 1999 (age 27); Pensacola, Florida, U.S.
- Listed height: 5 ft 11 in (1.80 m)
- Listed weight: 200 lb (91 kg)

Career information
- High school: Escambia (FL)
- College: Florida (2018–2021); Maryland (2022)
- NFL draft: 2023: undrafted

Career history
- Tennessee Titans (2023)*; Minnesota Vikings (2023)*; Pittsburgh Steelers (2023)*; Kansas City Chiefs (2024)*; Pittsburgh Steelers (2024)*; DC Defenders (2025)*; Edmonton Elks (2025)*; Orlando Pirates (2026)*
- * Offseason or practice squad member only
- Stats at Pro Football Reference

Jacob Darnell Copeland (born July 20, 1999) is an American football wide receiver. He played college football for the Florida Gators and the Maryland Terrapins.

== Early life ==
Copeland was raised in Pensacola, Florida, by his mother, Betty Copeland. His father, Darrick Bennett, was absent from his life as he spent periods in prison and died when Copeland was aged 13. Copeland's childhood home was in a crime-ridden neighborhood where he would witness robberies and shootings. In one incident when Copeland was aged eight, his half-brother was shot three times in the front yard but survived.

Copeland began playing youth football aged six. When he was 12, he moved into the home of his coach, Trampas Miller, after the Miller family expressed concern about Copeland's living conditions. Copeland credits the Miller family for saving his life.

Copeland attended Escambia High School in Pensacola, Florida and came out as a four-star recruit. He committed to the University of Florida on February 7, 2018, during a nationally televised press conference that went viral because his mother walked out after Copeland made his selection. Betty Copeland, who was raised in Alabama, claims that she walked out because she wanted him to choose her hometown team at the University of Alabama and he changed his mind without telling her. It has been wrongly speculated that her disapproval was because of gang relations that Copeland maintained in Florida which has been vehemently denied by Copeland and his family.

== College career ==
Copeland went to both University of Florida and University of Maryland, College Park.

=== Florida ===
During his freshman year at Florida, Copeland was redshirted, only appearing in three games. He had a kick return for 26 yards and a pass reception for 16 yards. During the 2019 season, he had 21 catches for 273 yards (13.0 avg) with two touchdowns on offense and special teams, playing in all 13 games. Additionally, he averaged 2.8 yards rushing (his long 15), along with his first tackle. As a sophomore in 2020, he played in 11 of 12 games, with 23 receptions for 435 yards (18.9 avg) and three touchdowns. In the 2021 season, Copeland appeared in all games (11 starts), with 38 receptions for 607 yards and four touchdowns. After the Bowl Game against UCF, he entered the transfer portal.

=== Maryland ===
On December 24, 2021, Copeland announced he was transferring to the University of Maryland, College Park. During his junior year, he had 422 yards and three touchdowns. Against Indiana, Copeland led the Terps with 62 receiving yards on four receptions. On December 2, 2022, Copeland announced that he would be skipping the Bowl and his senior year to enter the 2023 NFL draft.

== Professional career ==
=== East-West Shrine Bowl ===
Copeland originally planned to go to the NFLPA Collegiate Bowl with former teammate Durell Nchami. He instead got moved to the 2023 East-West Shrine Bowl. There he shined on the third day of practice. He further showed his catch ability the following day in practice. During the game Copeland caught one pass for seven yards (his only target).

=== Combine ===
On January 3, 2023, Copeland accepted an invitation to the NFL Combine along with fellow Maryland players Deonte Banks, Dontay Demus Jr., Jakorian Bennett, Rakim Jarrett, Jaelyn Duncan and Chad Ryland.

Pre-draft measurables
Height	Weight	Arm length	Hand span	Wingspan	40-yard dash	10-yard split	20-yard split	20-yard shuttle	Three-cone drill	Vertical jump	Broad jump	Bench press
5 ft 11 1/4 in (1.81 m)	201 lb (91 kg)	31 5/8 in (0.80 m)	8 5/8 in (0.22 m)	6 ft 4 3/4 in (1.95 m)	4.42 s	1.51 s	2.56 s	4.47 s	7.01 s	33.0 in (0.84 m)	10 ft 7 in (3.23 m)	20 reps
All values from NFL Combine

=== Tennessee Titans ===
On April 29, 2023, Copeland signed with the Tennessee Titans as an undrafted free agent. He was waived on August 2.

=== Minnesota Vikings ===
On August 7, 2023, Copeland signed with the Minnesota Vikings. He was waived on August 29, 2023.

=== Pittsburgh Steelers (first stint) ===
On September 12, 2023, Copeland signed with the Pittsburgh Steelers practice squad. He was released from the practice squad on October 3. Copeland was re-signed to the practice squad on November 28, but released a week later.

=== Kansas City Chiefs ===
On January 10, 2024, Copeland signed a reserve/future contract with the Kansas City Chiefs. He was waived on May 4, 2024.

=== Pittsburgh Steelers (second stint) ===
On June 21, 2024, Copeland signed a one-year contract with the Pittsburgh Steelers. He was waived on August 26.

=== DC Defenders ===
On December 4, 2024, Copeland signed with the DC Defenders of the United Football League (UFL). He was released on March 20, 2025.

=== Edmonton Elks ===
The Edmonton Elks of the CFL announced the signing of Copeland on April 9, 2025. He was released on May 10.

=== Orlando Pirates ===
On March 11, 2026, Copeland signed with the Orlando Pirates of the Indoor Football League (IFL). He was released on June 4.
