= Dontay Demus Jr. =

American football player (born 2000)

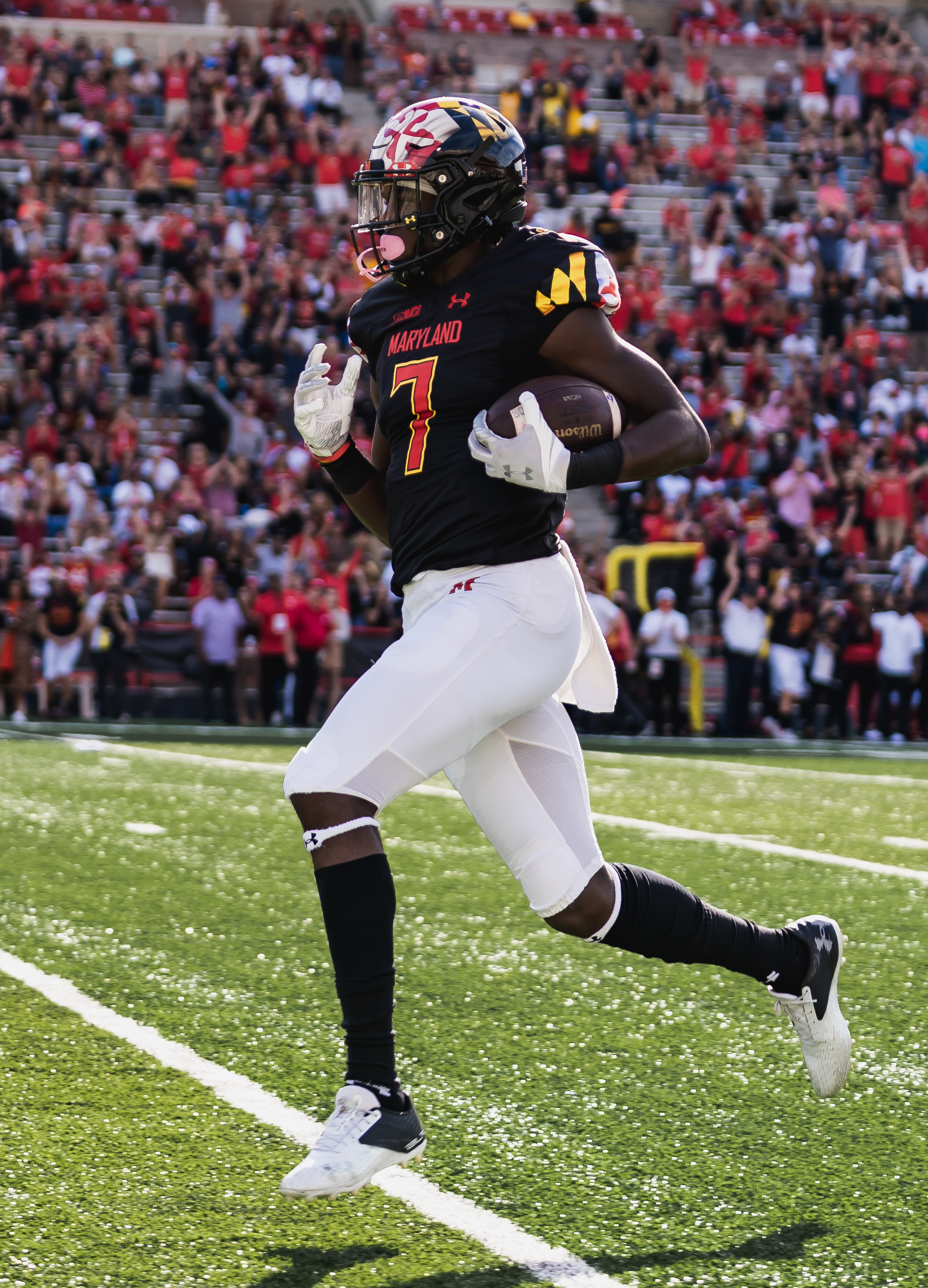
- Demus with Maryland in 2021

No. 10 – Massachusetts Pirates
- Position: Wide receiver

Personal information
- Born: September 26, 2000 (age 26); Washington, D.C., U.S.
- Listed height: 6 ft 4 in (1.93 m)
- Listed weight: 224 lb (102 kg)

Career information
- High school: Friendship Collegiate (Washington, D.C.)
- College: Maryland (2018–2022)
- NFL draft: 2023: undrafted

Career history
- Baltimore Ravens (2023)*; Philadelphia Stars (2024)*; Ottawa Redblacks (2024)*; Massachusetts Pirates (2024); Edmonton Elks (2024)*; Toronto Argonauts (2025)*; Massachusetts Pirates (2025–present)
- * Offseason or practice squad member only
- Stats at Pro Football Reference

Dontay Demus Jr. (born September 26, 2000) is an American football wide receiver for the Massachusetts Pirates of the Indoor Football League (IFL). He played college football at Maryland.

== Early life ==
Demus Jr. attended Friendship Collegiate Academy Public Charter School in Washington, D.C. As a senior, he had 66 receptions for 1,167 yards and 12 touchdowns. He committed to the University of Maryland, College Park to play college football.

== College career ==
As a true freshman at Maryland in 2018, Demus Jr. played in all 12 games with one start and had 13 receptions for 278 yards. As a sophomore in 2019, he started all 12 games, recording 41 receptions for 625 yards and six touchdowns. As a junior in 2020, he started all five games and had 24 receptions for 365 yards and four touchdowns. Demus Jr. returned to Maryland as a starter in 2021, leading the Big Ten Conference in receiving yards before suffering a season-ending knee injury in a game against Iowa. Demus came back to Maryland for his 5th season for 2022 after his injury the previous season. Instead of playing in the 2022 Duke's Mayo Bowl, he opted out of the bowl game with teammates Deonte Banks, Rakim Jarrett, and Jacob Copeland.

In January 2023, Demus was invited to participate in the 2023 NFL Combine.

== Professional career ==
Pre-draft measurables
Height	Weight	Arm length	Hand span	40-yard dash	10-yard split	20-yard split	20-yard shuttle	Vertical jump	Broad jump
6 ft 3 1/8 in (1.91 m)	212 lb (96 kg)	34 1/4 in (0.87 m)	9 3/4 in (0.25 m)	4.57 s	1.55 s	2.63 s	4.39 s	35.5 in (0.90 m)	10 ft 3 in (3.12 m)
All values from NFL Combine

=== Baltimore Ravens ===
Demus signed with the Baltimore Ravens as an undrafted free agent on May 5, 2023. He was waived on August 28. He was signed to their practice squad on September 26, 2023 and released again on October 3.

=== Philadelphia Stars ===
On December 6, 2023, Demus signed with the Philadelphia Stars of the United States Football League (USFL). The Stars folded when the XFL and USFL merged to create the United Football League (UFL).

=== Ottawa Redblacks ===
Demus was signed by the Ottawa Redblacks of the Canadian Football League (CFL) on January 22, 2024. He was released on May 15, 2024.

=== Massachusetts Pirates ===
Demus played in three games for the Massachusetts Pirates of the Indoor Football League in 2024, catching one pass for 11 yards.

=== Edmonton Elks ===
Demus was signed to the practice roster of the CFL's Edmonton Elks on September 14, 2024, and was later released on October 13, 2024.

=== Toronto Argonauts ===
On January 8, 2025, Demus signed with the Toronto Argonauts of the CFL. However, he was part of the final cuts on June 1, 2025.

=== Massachusetts Pirates (second stint) ===
On July 3, 2025, Demus signed back with the Massachusetts Pirates of the IFL.
