= 2023 All-Big Ten Conference football team =

College football honor

The 2023 All-Big Ten Conference football team consists of American football players chosen as All-Big Ten Conference players for the 2023 Big Ten Conference football season. The conference recognizes two official All-Big Ten selectors: (1) the Big Ten conference coaches selected separate offensive and defensive units and named first-, second- and third-team players (the "Coaches" team); and (2) a panel of sports writers and broadcasters covering the Big Ten also selected offensive and defensive units and named first-, second- and third-team players (the "Media" team).

== Key ==
Bold = Consensus first-team selection by both the coaches and media

Coaches = Selected by the Big Ten Conference coaches

Media = Selected by the conference media

== Offensive selections ==
=== Quarterbacks ===
- **J. J. McCarthy**, Michigan (Coaches-1; Media-1)
- Taulia Tagovailoa, Maryland (Coaches-2; Media-2)
- Kyle McCord, Ohio State (Coaches-3; Media-3)

=== Running backs ===
- **Blake Corum**, Michigan (Coaches-1; Media-1)
- **TreVeyon Henderson**, Ohio State (Coaches-1; Media-1)
- Kyle Monangai, Rutgers (Coaches-2; Media-2)
- Kaytron Allen, Penn State (Coaches-2; Media-3)
- Braelon Allen, Wisconsin (Coaches-3; Media-2)
- Nicholas Singleton, Penn State (Coaches-3; Media-3)

=== Wide receivers ===
- **Marvin Harrison Jr.**, Ohio State (Coaches-1; Media-1)
- **Isaiah Williams**, Illinois (Coaches-1; Media-1)
- Daniel Jackson, Minnesota (Coaches-2; Media-2)
- Roman Wilson, Michigan (Coaches-2; Media-2)
- Deion Burks, Purdue (Coaches-2)
- Emeka Egbuka, Ohio State (Coaches-3)
- Will Pauling, Wisconsin (Coaches-3)
- Tai Felton, Maryland (Media-3)
- Jeshaun Jones, Maryland (Media-3)

=== Centers ===
- **Drake Nugent**, Michigan (Coaches-1; Media-1)
- Hunter Nourzad, Penn State (Coaches-2; Media-2)
- Logan Jones, Iowa (Coaches-3)
- Tanor Bortolini, Wisconsin (Media-3)

=== Guards ===
- **Donovan Jackson**, Ohio State (Coaches-1; Media-1)
- **Zak Zinter**, Michigan (Coaches-1; Media-1)
- Trevor Keegan, Michigan (Coaches-2; Media-2)
- Matthew Jones, Ohio State (Coaches-2; Media-2)
- Connor Colby, Iowa (Coaches-3; Media-3)
- Josh Priebe, Northwestern (Coaches-3; Media-3)
- Nick DeJong, Iowa (Coaches-3)

=== Tackles ===
- **Olu Fashanu**, Penn State (Coaches-1; Media-1)
- LaDarius Henderson, Michigan (Coaches-1; Media-2)
- Josh Fryar, Ohio State (Coaches-3; Media-1)
- Aireontae Ersery, Minnesota (Coaches-2; Media-2)
- Karsen Barnhart, Michigan (Coaches-2; Media-3)
- Delmar Glaze, Maryland (Coaches-3; Media-3)

=== Tight ends ===
- Colston Loveland, Michigan (Coaches-1; Media-2)
- Cade Stover, Ohio State (Coaches-2; Media-1)
- Tyler Warren, Penn State (Coaches-3)
- Corey Dyches, Maryland (Media-3)

== Defensive selections ==
=== Defensive linemen ===
- **Johnny Newton**, Illinois (Coaches-1; Media-1)
- **Chop Robinson**, Penn State (Coaches-1; Media-1)
- **JT Tuimoloau**, Ohio State (Coaches-1; Media-1)
- Mason Graham, Michigan (Coaches-1; Media-3)
- Adisa Isaac, Penn State (Coaches-2; Media-1)
- Kris Jenkins Jr., Michigan (Coaches-2; Media-2)
- Nic Scourton, Purdue (Coaches-2; Media-2)
- Kenneth Grant, Michigan (Coaches-2; Media-3)
- Jack Sawyer, Ohio State (Coaches-3; Media-2)
- Tyleik Williams, Ohio State (Coaches-3; Media-2)
- Dani Dennis-Sutton, Penn State (Coaches-3)
- Mike Hall Jr., Ohio State (Coaches-3)
- Joe Evans, Iowa (Media-3)
- Keith Randolph Jr., Illinois (Media-3)

=== Linebackers ===
- **Tommy Eichenberg**, Ohio State (Coaches-1; Media-1)
- **Jay Higgins**, Iowa (Coaches-1; Media-1)
- Abdul Carter, Penn State (Coaches-1; Media-2)
- Aaron Casey, Indiana (Coaches-2; Media-1)
- Junior Colson, Michigan (Coaches-2; Media-2)
- Bryce Gallagher, Northwestern (Coaches-2; Media-2)
- Michael Barrett, Michigan (Coaches-3)
- Ruben Hyppolite II, Maryland (Coaches-3)
- Luke Reimer, Nebraska (Coaches-3)
- Steele Chambers, Ohio State (Media-3)
- Nick Jackson, Iowa (Media-3)
- Xander Mueller, Northwestern (Media-3)

=== Defensive backs ===
- **Cooper DeJean**, Iowa (Coaches-1; Media-1)
- **Will Johnson**, Michigan (Coaches-1; Media-1)
- **Tyler Nubin**, Minnesota (Coaches-1; Media-1)
- Denzel Burke, Ohio State (Coaches-1; Media-2)
- Mike Sainristil, Michigan (Coaches-2; Media-1)
- Kalen King, Penn State (Coaches-2; Media-2)
- Dillon Thieneman, Purdue (Coaches-2; Media-3)
- Tarheeb Still, Maryland (Coaches-2; Media-3)
- Hunter Wohler, Wisconsin (Coaches-3; Media-2)
- Sebastian Castro, Iowa (Media-2)
- Johnny Dixon, Penn State (Coaches-3)
- Daequan Hardy, Penn State (Coaches-3)
- Rod Moore, Michigan (Coaches-3)
- Ricardo Hallman, Wisconsin (Media-3)
- Josh Proctor, Ohio State (Media-3)

== Special teams ==
=== Kickers ===
- **Dragan Kesich**, Minnesota (Coaches-1; Media-1)
- Alex Felkins, Penn State (Coaches-3; Media-2)
- James Turner, Michigan (Coaches-2)
- Jayden Fielding, Ohio State (Coaches-2)
- Drew Stevens, Iowa (Coaches-3)
- Jai Patel, Rutgers (Media-3)

=== Punters ===
- **Tory Taylor**, Iowa (Coaches-1; Media-1)
- Ryan Eckley, Michigan State (Coaches-2; Media-2)
- Tommy Doman, Michigan (Coaches-3)
- James Evans, Indiana (Media-3)

=== Return specialist ===
- **Cooper DeJean**, Iowa (Coaches-1; Media-1)
- Daequan Hardy, Penn State (Coaches-2; Media-2)
- Tyrone Tracy Jr., Purdue(Coaches-3)
- Jaylin Lucas, Indiana (Media-3)
