= Durell Nchami =

American football player (born 2000)

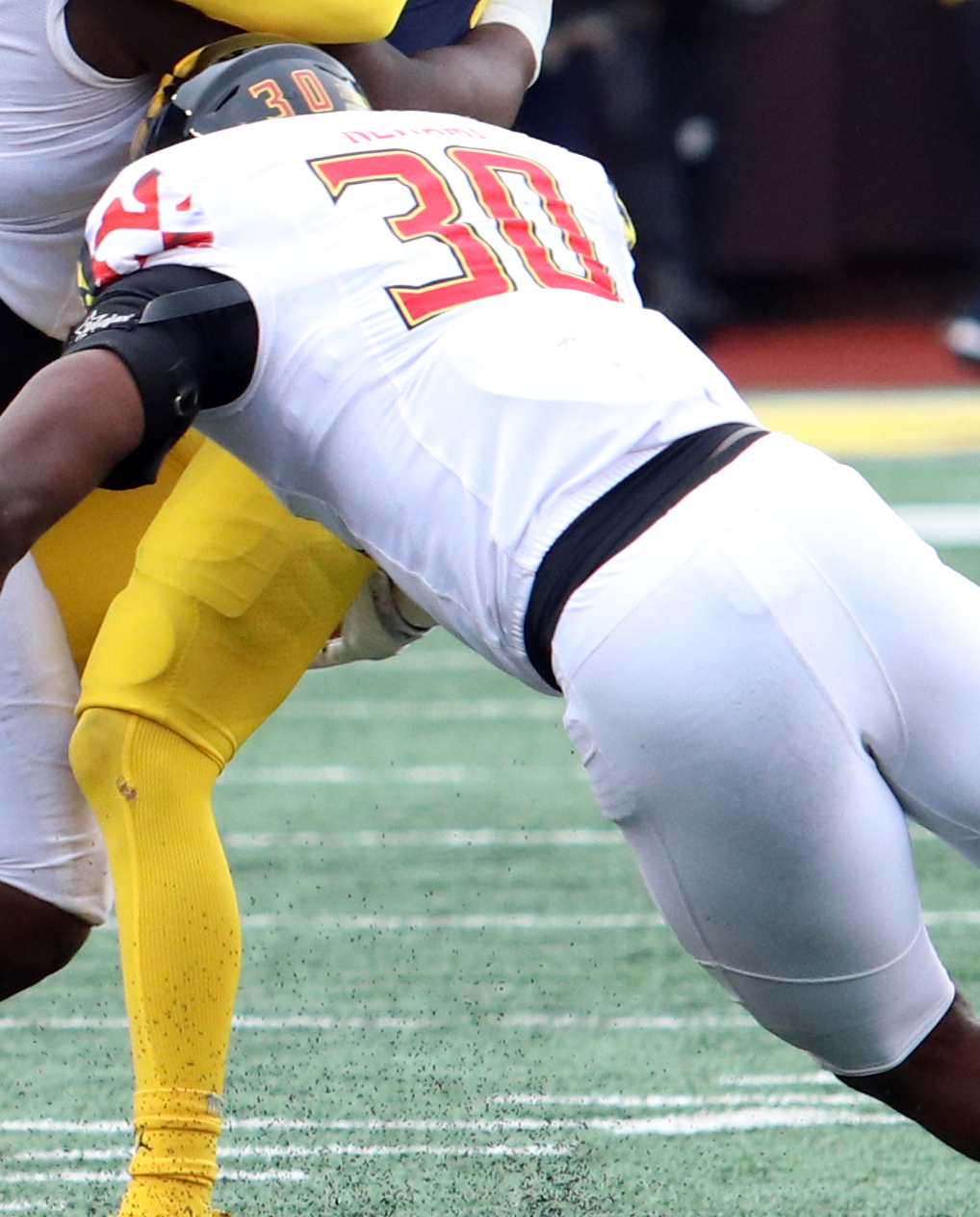
- Nchami with Maryland in 2022

Profile
- Position: Defensive end

Personal information
- Born: February 11, 2000 (age 26); Silver Spring, Maryland, U.S.
- Listed height: 6 ft 4 in (1.93 m)
- Listed weight: 258 lb (117 kg)

Career information
- High school: Paint Branch (Burtonsville, Maryland)
- College: Maryland (2018–2022)
- NFL draft: 2023: undrafted

Career history
- Denver Broncos (2023)*; Indianapolis Colts (2024–2025)
- * Offseason or practice squad member only

Career NFL statistics
- Games played: 1
- Stats at Pro Football Reference

Durell Nchami (born February 11, 2000) is an American professional football defensive end. He played college football for the Maryland Terrapins.

== Early life ==
Coming out of Paint Branch High School, Nchami was rated as a three-star recruit, where he decided to commit to play college football for the Maryland Terrapins.

== College career ==
In his freshman season, Nchami made 15 tackles, 4.5 tackles for loss, one sack, and one blocked kick in ten games. However, Nchami suffered season-ending injuries in 2019 and 2021. Nchami bounced back and had his best career season in 2022; he started 11 games and totaled 20 tackles, six tackles for loss, three sacks, and one forced fumble. After the conclusion of the 2022 season, Nchami declared for the 2023 NFL draft. Nchami finished his career at Maryland notching 49 tackles, nine sacks, four forced fumbles, and one pass deflection in 33 games played.

== Professional career ==
Pre-draft measurables
Height	Weight
6 ft 4 in (1.93 m)	258 lb (117 kg)
Values from Pro Day

=== Denver Broncos ===
Nchami was not selected in the 2023 NFL Draft. On December 6, 2023, the Denver Broncos signed Nchami to their practice squad. He signed a reserve/future contract on January 8, 2024.

On August 27, 2024, Nchami was designated as waived/injured by the Broncos.

=== Indianapolis Colts ===
On November 25, 2024, Nchami was signed to the Indianapolis Colts' practice squad. He signed a reserve/future contract with the Colts on January 6, 2025.

On August 26, 2025, Nchami was waived by the Colts as part of final roster cuts and re-signed to the practice squad the next day. He signed a reserve/future contract with Indianapolis on January 5, 2026.

On August 30, 2026, Nchami was waived by the Colts.
