= DJ Glaze =

American football player (born 2002)

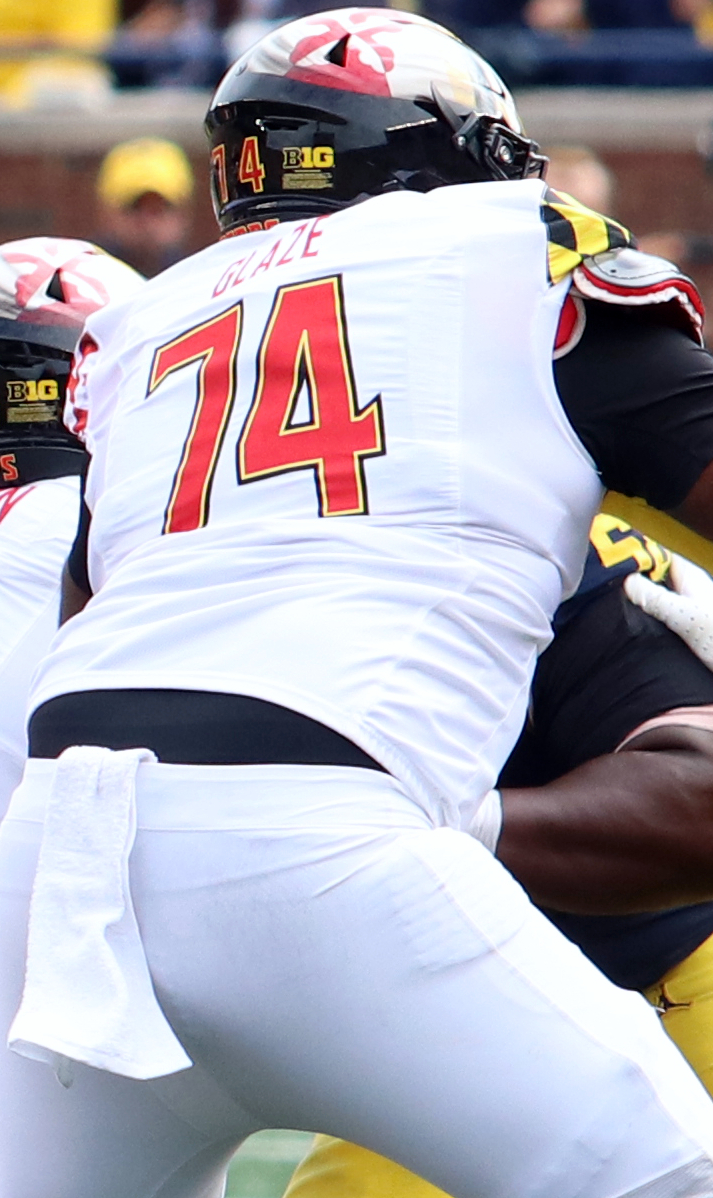
- Glaze with Maryland in 2022

No. 71 – Las Vegas Raiders
- Position: Offensive tackle
- Roster status: Active

Personal information
- Born: August 4, 2002 (age 24); Charlotte, North Carolina, U.S.
- Listed height: 6 ft 4 in (1.93 m)
- Listed weight: 331 lb (150 kg)

Career information
- High school: West Mecklenburg (Charlotte)
- College: Maryland (2020–2023)
- NFL draft: 2024: 3rd round, 77th overall pick

Career history
- Las Vegas Raiders (2024–present)

Awards and highlights
- Third-team All-Big Ten (2023)

Career NFL statistics as of 2025
- Games played: 34
- Games started: 31
- Stats at Pro Football Reference

Delmar "DJ" Glaze (born August 4, 2002) is an American professional football offensive tackle for the Las Vegas Raiders of the National Football League (NFL). He played college football for the Maryland Terrapins and was selected by the Raiders in the third round of the 2024 NFL draft.

== Early life ==
Glaze grew up in Charlotte, North Carolina and attended West Mecklenburg High School. At high school, Glaze was named to the 2019 SoMECK First Team All-Conference. He was rated a three-star recruit and committed to play college football at the University of Maryland, College Park over offers from Alabama A&M, Appalachian State, Campbell, Connecticut, East Tennessee State, FIU, Jacksonville State, Massachusetts, Morgan State, Notre Dame College and South Carolina State.

== College career ==
During Glaze's true freshman season in 2020, he appeared in only one game on the offensive line and was redshirted. During the 2021 season, he appeared in all 13 games at tackle and finished the season with the fourth highest pass blocking grade in the Big Ten. He also blocked for the record-setting pass offense, making a program record of the most passing yards with 3,960. During the 2022 season, he appeared in and started all 13 games at tackle. He finished the season with being the second highest graded pass blocking tackle in the Big Ten and the seventh in the FBS with a grade of 85.7. He helped block for the fourth-ranked offense in the Big Ten and also blocked for quarterback, Taulia Tagovailoa. During the 2023 season, he appeared in and started all 12 games. He was named on the third team All-Big Ten and was a 2024 NFL draft prospect.

== Professional career ==
Pre-draft measurables
Height	Weight	Arm length	Hand span	Wingspan	40-yard dash	10-yard split	20-yard split	20-yard shuttle	Three-cone drill	Vertical jump	Broad jump	Bench press
6 ft 4 1/8 in (1.93 m)	315 lb (143 kg)	34 7/8 in (0.89 m)	10 1/4 in (0.26 m)	6 ft 10 3/4 in (2.10 m)	5.21 s	1.78 s	3.01 s	4.83 s	8.15 s	25.5 in (0.65 m)	8 ft 8 in (2.64 m)	29 reps
All values from NFL Combine/Pro Day

Glaze was drafted by the Las Vegas Raiders in the third round (77th overall) of the 2024 NFL draft.
