= Mike Miller (American football coach, born 1991) =

American football player and coach (born 1991)

Current position
- Title: Offensive Assistant
- Team: Clemson
- Conference: ACC

Biographical details
- Born: January 15, 1991 (age 35); Irmo, South Carolina, U.S.

Playing career
- 2011–2013: UAB
- Position: Quarterback

Coaching career (HC unless noted)
- 2014: UAB (SA)
- 2015: Clemson (SA)
- 2016: Charlotte Christian School (NC) (OC/QB)
- 2017–2018: Alabama (GA)
- 2019–2021: Maryland (TE)
- 2022: Maryland (co-OC/TE)
- 2023–2024: Charlotte (OC/QB)
- 2026–present: Clemson (Assistant)

Mike "Mikie" Miller (born January 15, 1991) is an American college football coach and former player. He was previously the co-offensive coordinator and tight ends coach for Maryland.

== Playing career ==
Miller was born in Irmo, South Carolina, grew up in Charlotte, North Carolina before moving to Tequesta, Florida in 2000. He attended The King's Academy and was a two-year starter at quarterback for the school's football team. Miller enrolled at University of Alabama at Birmingham (UAB) and joined the UAB Blazers football team as a walk-on. He earned a scholarship after his sophomore season. Miller's playing career ended after suffering a shoulder injury prior to the start of his senior season.

== Coaching career ==
Miller stayed with the UAB Blazers as a student coach until the program was shut down after the 2014 season. He secured a student coaching position at Clemson under head coach Dabo Swinney shortly after UAB discontinued football. He slept on an air mattress in the offensive staff room. Miller was granted a waiver from the NCAA to remain enrolled at UAB, where he was still under scholarship and close to graduation, instead of having to enroll at the school and have his graduation date pushed back due to credit issues. Miller spent 2016 as the offensive coordinator and quarterbacks coach for the Charlotte Christian School. While at Charlotte Christian, he coached future Mississippi State and Syracuse starting quarterback Garrett Shrader and the Knights averaged over 40 points per game and had a 10–1 record. Miller was hired as a graduate assistant at Alabama by head coach Nick Saban in 2017 to work under newly hired offensive coordinator Brian Daboll.

Miller was hired as the tight ends coach at the University of Maryland after the 2018 season, joining the inaugural staff of former Alabama Offensive Coordinator Mike Locksley, becoming one of the youngest Big Ten position coaches in the country. He was named the Terrapins' co-Offensive Coordinator in addition to tight ends coach entering the 2022 season.

On November 29, 2022, Miller was announced to be joining new head coach, Biff Poggi's staff at Charlotte as the offensive coordinator and quarterbacks coach.

== Personal life ==
Miller is married to the former Megan Kintz of Atlantis, Florida. They met in middle school and both graduated from The King's Academy. They were married in December 2015. They have three children, Bo, Grisham and Mary-Caitlin. His father Mike Miller played WR at Ole Miss from 1975 to 1979. Miller's grandfather Arthur Miller played Offensive Line at Duke for legendary head coach Wallace Wade before serving in the Air Force as a fighter pilot.
