= Corey Dyches =

American football player

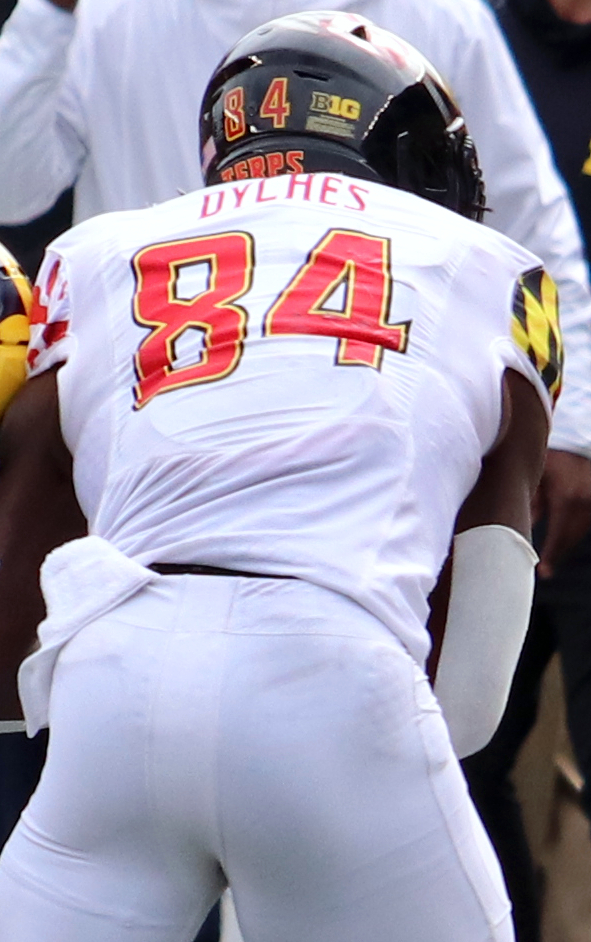
- Dyches with Maryland in 2022

Profile
- Position: Tight end

Personal information
- Born: August 27, 2002 (age 24)
- Listed height: 6 ft 2 in (1.88 m)
- Listed weight: 220 lb (100 kg)

Career information
- High school: Potomac (Oxon Hill, Maryland)
- College: Maryland (2020–2023); California (2024)
- NFL draft: 2025: undrafted

Career history
- Calgary Stampeders (2026)*
- * Offseason or practice squad member only

Awards and highlights
- Third-team All-Big Ten (2023)
- Stats at ESPN
- Stats at CFL.ca

Corey Dyches (born August 27, 2002) is an American professional football tight end. He played college football for the Maryland Terrapins and California Golden Bears.

== Early life ==
Dyches grew up in Oxon Hill, Maryland, and attended Potomac High School where he lettered in football and basketball. In his high school career, Dyches totaled 134 receptions for 2,777 yards and 39 touchdowns. Dyches was a three-star ranked recruit and committed to play college football at the University of Maryland, College Park over offers from Boston College, East Carolina, UMass, North Carolina, Pittsburgh, Rutgers, Syracuse, Temple and Toledo. He was a 2020 first-team All- Met basketball player who averaged 24 points per game according The Washington Post.

== College career ==
During Dyches's true freshman season in 2020, he appeared in only two games.

During the 2021 season, he appeared in all 13 games and started two of them at tight end. He finished the season with totaling 19 receptions for 208 yards and four touchdowns.

During the 2022 season, he appeared in all 13 games and started four of them. He finished the season with 39 caught passes for 494 yards and three touchdowns averaging 12.67 yards per reception. During the 2022 Duke's Mayo Bowl, he caught four passes for 45 yards to take the win against NC State.

During the 2023 season, he became the only returning tight end on the roster with a collegiate reception. And on December 4, Dyches entered the transfer portal.

On April 11, 2024, he announced that he would transfer to Charlotte. However, on April 25, he flipped his commitment to California.

== Professional career ==
Dyches signed a futures contract with the Calgary Stampeders of the Canadian Football League (CFL) on October 30, 2025. He was released on May 9, 2026.
