= 2022 Duke's Mayo Bowl =

Postseason college football bowl game

- 21st Duke's Mayo Bowl
Maryland Terrapins	NC State Wolfpack
(7–5)	(8–4)
Big Ten	ACC
16	12
Head coach: Mike Locksley	Head coach: Dave Doeren
	AP / Coaches / CFP; 25 / RV / 23
	1	2	3	4	Total
Maryland	3	7	3	3	16
NC State	3	6	0	3	12
- Date: December 30, 2022
- Season: 2022
- Stadium: Bank of America Stadium
- Location: Charlotte, North Carolina
- MVP: Jakorian Bennett (DB, Maryland)
- Favorite: NC State by 2
- Referee: Mike McCabe (Pac-12)
- Attendance: 37,228
- Payout: US$4,780,461

United States TV coverage
- Network: ESPN
- Announcers: Anish Shroff (play-by-play), Brock Osweiler (analyst), and Andraya Carter (sideline)

The 2022 Duke's Mayo Bowl was a college football bowl game played on December 30, 2022, at Bank of America Stadium in Charlotte, North Carolina. The 21st annual Duke's Mayo Bowl, the game featured the NC State Wolfpack from the Atlantic Coast Conference (ACC) and the Maryland Terrapins from the Big Ten Conference. The game began at 12:04 p.m. EST and was aired on ESPN. It was one of the 2022–23 bowl games concluding the 2022 FBS football season. The game's title sponsor was Duke's Mayonnaise.

== Teams ==
This was the 21st edition of the game, though only the third under its current name; the bowl had gone by three other names since its inauguration in 2002. Consistent with conference tie-ins, the game featured the NC State Wolfpack from the Atlantic Coast Conference (ACC) and the Maryland Terrapins from the Big Ten Conference (B1G). This was the 71st meeting between NC State and Maryland, who spent 1953 to 2014 in the ACC together; entering the game, the all-time series was tied, 33–33–4. The teams last met in 2013, a contest also won by Maryland. This was NC State's 35th overall bowl game appearance and their fourth in this particular game, having competed in 2005, 2011, 2015. Maryland made their 29th overall bowl game appearance and their first in this particular game.

=== NC State Wolfpack ===
NC State finished their regular season with an overall 8–4 record, 4–4 in ACC games. After starting with four wins against non-conference opponents, the Wolfpack went 4-4 during Atlantic Coast Conference games for the rest of the season. The Wolfpack played four ranked teams, losing to Clemson, Syracuse, while defeating North Carolina and Wake Forest. They also defeated eventual No. 13 Florida State, although Florida State was not ranked at the time they played NC State.

=== Maryland Terrapins ===
Maryland finished their regular season with an overall 7–5 record, 4–5 in B1G games. After starting with three wins against non-conference opponents, the Terrapins went 4–5 during Big Ten Conference games for the rest of the season. The Terrapins played three ranked teams, losing to Michigan, Ohio State, and Penn State.

== Game summary ==
2022 Duke's Mayo Bowl

Quarter	1	2	3	4	Total
Maryland	3	7	3	3	16
No. 23 NC State	3	6	0	3	12

at Bank of America Stadium • Charlotte, North Carolina

- Date: Friday, December 30, 2022
- Game time: 12:00 p.m. EST
- Game weather: Cloudy • Temperature: 58 °F (14 °C) • Wind: 1 mph (1.6 km/h) east
- Game attendance: 37,228
- Referee: Mike McCabe
- TV announcers (ESPN): Anish Shroff (play-by-play), Brock Osweiler (analyst), and Andraya Carter (sideline)
- Box score

Scoring summary

Quarter	Time	Drive			Team	Scoring information	Score	
Quarter	Time	Plays	Yards	TOP	Team	Scoring information	Maryland	NC State
1	6:10	7	59	2:53	NC State	38-yard field goal by Christopher Dunn	0	3
1	3:24	5	29	2:46	Maryland	42-yard field goal by Chad Ryland	3	3
2	8:07	8	68	3:33	Maryland	Octavian Smith Jr. 19-yard touchdown reception from Taulia Tagovailoa, Chad Ryland kick good	10	3
2	4:37	11	73	3:30	NC State	19-yard field goal by Christopher Dunn	10	6
2	0:14	7	32	0:58	NC State	38-yard field goal by Christopher Dunn	10	9
3	8:06	12	59	4:52	Maryland	33-yard field goal by Chad Ryland	13	9
4	9:23	5	26	1:50	NC State	26-yard field goal by Christopher Dunn	13	12
4	5:36	10	48	3:47	Maryland	45-yard field goal by Chad Ryland	16	12
"TOP" = time of possession. For other American football terms, see Glossary of American football.							16	12

== Statistics ==
Team statistical comparison
Statistic	Maryland	NC State
First downs	17	13
First downs rushing	5	1
First downs passing	12	10
First downs penalty	0	2
Third down efficiency	10–21	5–18
Fourth down efficiency	0–2	0–1
Total plays–net yards	79–342	66–296
Rushing attempts–net yards	41–76	18–27
Yards per rush	1.9	1.5
Yards passing	266	269
Pass completions–attempts	20–38	22–48
Interceptions thrown	2	2
Punt returns–total yards	3–11	2–8
Kickoff returns–total yards	3–73	0–0
Punts–average yardage	5–45.2	7–41.0
Fumbles–lost	1–0	0–0
Penalties–yards	8–60	6–35
Time of possession	35:34	24:26

Maryland statistics
Terrapins passing
	C–A	Yds	TD–INT
Taulia Tagovailoa	19–37	221	1–2
Billy Edwards Jr.	1–1	45	0–0
Terrapins rushing
	Car	Yds	TD
Roman Hemby	24	65	0
Antwain Littleton II	3	9	0
Octavian Smith Jr.	1	8	0
Taulia Tagovailoa	9	3	0
Team	1	-1	0
Billy Edwards Jr.	3	-8	0
Terrapins receiving
	Rec	Yds	TD
Jeshaun Jones	4	79	0
Tai Felton	4	69	0
Corey Dyches	4	45	0
Octavian Smith Jr.	3	34	1
Roman Hemby	2	22	0
Shaleak Knotts	1	18	0
Ramon Brown	1	1	0
Antwain Littleton II	1	-2	0

NC State statistics
Wolfpack passing
	C–A	Yds	TD–INT
Ben Finley	22–48	269	0–2
Wolfpack rushing
	Car	Yds	TD
Jordan Houston	9	14	0
Demarcus Jones II	5	5	0
Michael Allen	3	5	0
Delbert Mimms III	1	3	0
Wolfpack receiving
	Rec	Yds	TD
Thayer Thomas	4	54	0
Darryl Jones	3	49	0
Christopher Toudle	2	41	0
Keyon Lesane	2	30	0
Demarcus Jones II	1	25	0
Julian Gray	2	21	0
Michael Allen	3	21	0
Porter Rooks	2	18	0
Cedd Seabrough	2	7	0
Jordan Houston	1	3	0
