= Ruben Hyppolite II =

American football player (born 2001)

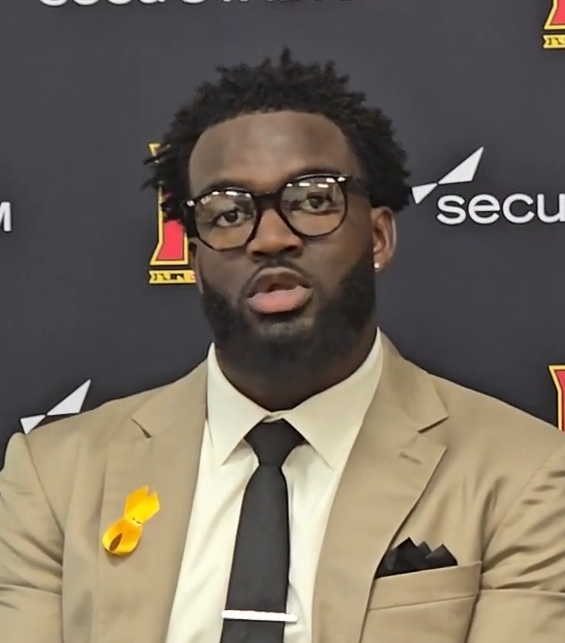
- Hyppolite in 2024

Profile
- Position: Linebacker

Personal information
- Born: September 16, 2001 (age 25)
- Listed height: 6 ft 0 in (1.83 m)
- Listed weight: 236 lb (107 kg)

Career information
- High school: McArthur (Hollywood, Florida)
- College: Maryland (2020–2024)
- NFL draft: 2025: 4th round, 132nd overall pick

Career history
- Chicago Bears (2025)

Awards and highlights
- Third-team All-Big Ten (2023)

Career NFL statistics as of 2025
- Total tackles: 6
- Stats at Pro Football Reference

Ruben Hyppolite II (born September 16, 2001) is an American professional football linebacker. He played college football for the Maryland Terrapins and was selected by the Bears in the fourth round of the 2025 NFL draft.

== Early life ==
Hyppolite grew up in Fort Lauderdale, Florida. He first attended American Heritage School in Plantation, where he played football and won two state championships. He then transferred to McArthur High School so that he would be able to graduate early (he was unable to at American Heritage, a private school). After playing at McArthur, Hyppolite was ranked a four-star prospect and one of the top-25 linebackers nationally. He was invited to the International Bowl as a member of the U.S. national team. He committed to play college football for the Maryland Terrapins.

== College career ==
Hyppolite appeared in four games in 2020, recording 14 tackles. He then started 12 games as a sophomore in 2021, totaling 62 tackles and two tackles-for-loss (TFLs), and started eight games in 2022, recording 24 tackles and a pass breakup. He started all 13 games as a senior in 2023 and placed second for the Terrapins with 66 tackles, also totaling 2.5 TFLs and a pass breakup. He returned for a final season in 2024 and led the Terrapins with 66 tackles. He concluded his five-year collegiate career having appeared in 51 games, recording 236 tackles, three sacks and six passes defended.

== Professional career ==
Pre-draft measurables
Height	Weight	Arm length	Hand span	40-yard dash	10-yard split	20-yard split	20-yard shuttle	Three-cone drill	Vertical jump	Broad jump	Bench press
5 ft 11 5/8 in (1.82 m)	236 lb (107 kg)	31 5/8 in (0.80 m)	9 in (0.23 m)	4.42 s	1.53 s	2.58 s	4.34 s	6.96 s	33.0 in (0.84 m)	9 ft 10 in (3.00 m)	18 reps
All values from Pro Day

Hyppolite was selected by the Chicago Bears in the fourth round (132nd overall) of the 2025 NFL draft.

Seen as a raw yet speedy and intelligent prospect, Hyppolite primarily played special teams during his rookie season. He also saw snaps on defense, recording three tackles in the season opener against the Minnesota Vikings and starting Week 12 versus the Pittsburgh Steelers. However, he suffered a shoulder injury in the latter. Hyppolite concluded his first year with six tackles in seven games.

On August 30, 2026, Hyppolite was waived/injured by the Bears. After going unclaimed, he reverted to the Bears' injured reserve. He was later released on September 9.
