= Deonte Banks =

American football player (born 2001)

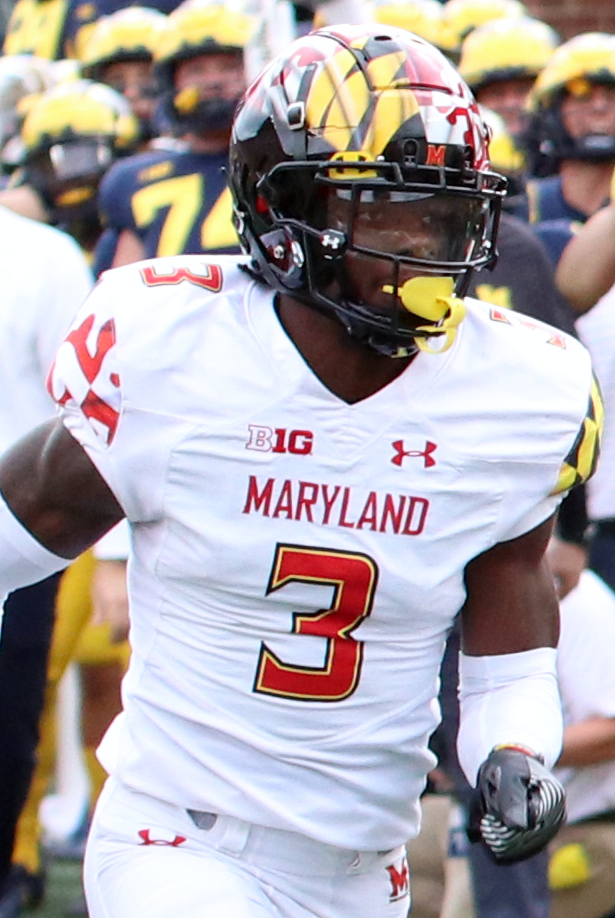
- Banks with the Maryland Terrapins in 2022

No. 2 – New York Giants
- Positions: Cornerback, kick returner
- Roster status: Active

Personal information
- Born: March 3, 2001 (age 25); Baltimore, Maryland, U.S.
- Listed height: 6 ft 2 in (1.88 m)
- Listed weight: 200 lb (91 kg)

Career information
- High school: Edgewood (Edgewood, Maryland)
- College: Maryland (2019–2022)
- NFL draft: 2023: 1st round, 24th overall pick

Career history
- New York Giants (2023–present)

Career NFL statistics as of Week 10, 2026
- Total tackles: 174
- Forced fumbles: 1
- Pass deflections: 39
- Interceptions: 3
- Return yards: 659
- Touchdowns: 2
- Stats at Pro Football Reference

Deonte Banks (born March 3, 2001) is an American professional football cornerback and kick returner for the New York Giants of the National Football League (NFL). He played college football for the Maryland Terrapins and was selected by the Giants in the first round of the 2023 NFL draft.

== Early life ==
Banks was born on March 3, 2001, in Baltimore, Maryland. He attended Edgewood High School before playing college football for the Maryland Terrapins at the University of Maryland, College Park. Banks also briefly attended Saint Frances Academy in high school, but ended up transferring out, for unknown reasons.

== College career ==
As a freshman, he recorded 28 tackles, an interception, and 2 pass breakups. Maryland only played 5 games in 2020 due to the COVID-19 pandemic, with Banks recording 11 tackles and a pass breakup. In 2021, Banks suffered a season-ending shoulder injury in the second game. In 2022, he had 26 tackles, an interception, 8 pass breakups, and a blocked extra point. Banks declared for the 2023 NFL draft following the season and participated in the NFL Combine.

== Professional career ==
=== Pre-draft ===
Pro Football Focus listed Banks as the third best cornerback prospect (18th overall) on their big board. NFL.com media analyst Daniel Jeremiah and ESPN analyst Mel Kiper Jr. had Banks ranked as the fourth best cornerback in the draft. Scouts Inc. listed Banks as the fifth best cornerback (27th overall) on their big board. Cory Giddings of Bleacher Report had him ranked fifth amongst all cornerbacks (36th overall) available in the draft. Dane Brugler of the Athletic ranked Banks as the fifth best cornerback available in the draft. NFL draft analysts projected him to be selected in the first round of the 2023 NFL Draft.

External videos
- NFL Combine Workout: Deonte Banks
- Deonte Banks runs 4.35s 40-yard dash
- 2023 Prospect Profile: Deonte Banks

Pre-draft measurables
Height	Weight	Arm length	Hand span	Wingspan	40-yard dash	10-yard split	20-yard split	Vertical jump	Broad jump
6 ft 0 1/8 in (1.83 m)	197 lb (89 kg)	31 3/8 in (0.80 m)	9 3/8 in (0.24 m)	6 ft 5 1/8 in (1.96 m)	4.35 s	1.49 s	2.47 s	42 in (1.07 m)	11 ft 4 in (3.45 m)
All values from NFL Combine

=== 2023 ===
The New York Giants selected Banks in the first round (24th overall) of the 2023 NFL draft. The New York Giants orchestrated a trade with the Jacksonville Jaguars in order to secure the selection of Banks and agreed to send their 2023 first-round (25th overall), fifth-round (160th overall), and sixth-round (240th overall) selections essentially to move one spot up to select Banks with the 24th overall pick. He was the fourth cornerback drafted and the first of two cornerbacks drafted by the Giants in 2023, along with sixth-round pick (209th overall) Tre Hawkins.

External videos
- Giants select Deonte Banks No. 24
- Post-Draft Interview: Deonte Banks

On May 18, 2023, the New York Giants signed Banks to a four–year, $13.59 million contract that includes a signing bonus of $6.87 million and is fully guaranteed upon signing.

He entered training camp as the projected No. 2 starting cornerback under defensive coordinator Don Martindale, replacing Aaron Robinson, who remained on the PUP list due to an injury in 2022. Head coach Brian Daboll named him a starting cornerback to begin the regular season, pairing him with Adoree Jackson. Throughout training camp, Banks wore No. 36 and No. 37 as his college number, No. 3, was unavailable and already being worn by veteran wide receiver Sterling Shepard. Following the preseason, Banks officially chose to wear No. 25 to begin his rookie season, after it became available after Rodarius Williams was cut during camp.

On September 10, 2023, Banks made his professional regular season debut and earned his first career start in the New York Giants' home-opener against the Dallas Cowboys and recorded one tackle and set a season-high with two pass deflections as they lost 0–40. On October 22, 2023, Banks recorded seven combined tackles (five solo), made one pass deflection, and made his first career interception off a pass attempt thrown by Sam Howell to wide receiver Jahan Dotson as the Giants defeated the Washington Commanders 14–7. In week 12, he made four combined tackles (three solo), one pass deflection, and had his second interception of the season on a pass by Mac Jones to wide receiver Demario Douglas during a 10–7 victory against the New England Patriots. In week 14, he set a new season-high with 12 combined tackles (nine solo) and broke up a pass as the Giants defeated the Green Bay Packers 24–22. On December 25, 2023, Banks recorded six solo tackles before exiting during the third quarter of a 25–33 loss at the Philadelphia Eagles after injuring his shoulder. He was subsequently inactive for the last two games (Weeks 17–18) of the season. He finished his rookie season in 2023 with a total of 64 combined tackles (53 solo), 11 passes defended, and made two interceptions in 15 games and 15 starts. He received an overall grade of 51.4 from Pro Football Focus as a rookie in 2023.

=== 2024 ===
On February 6, 2024, the New York Giants announced the hiring of Shane Bowen as their new defensive coordinator after they agreed to mutually part ways with Don Martindale. On February 9, 2024, Banks posted a picture of him wearing a Giants' jersey with No. 3 on Instagram, signifying his decision to switch after No. 3 became available after Sterling Shepard departed in free agency. He wore No. 3 during his collegiate career. He entered training camp slated as the No. 1 starting cornerback. Head coach Brian Daboll named him a starting cornerback to begin the season and paired him with Cordale Flott.

In week 5, Banks recorded six combined tackles (two solo) and set a new career-high with three pass deflections during a 29–20 victory at the Seattle Seahawks. On November 24, 2024, Banks set a season-high with six combined tackles (five solo) and made one pass deflection as the Giants lost 7–30 to the Tampa Bay Buccaneers. He would be inactive for three consecutive games (13–15) after he suffered an injury to his ribs. He finished the 2024 NFL season with a total of 52 combined tackles (39 solo) and made 12 pass deflections in 14 games and 14 starts. He received an overall grade of 50.9 from Pro Football Focus, which ranked 182nd amongst 222 qualifying cornerbacks in 2024.

=== 2025 ===
On April 2, 2025, the New York Giants announced changes in jersey numbers, with Banks changing his jersey number for a third consecutive season, going from his college No. 3 to No. 2 in order to accommodate newly acquired free agent quarterback Russell Wilson who had only wore No. 3 throughout his 13-year career. Wilson released a statement on Instagram thanking Banks for agreeing to the change. On December 28, Banks scored his first career touchdown on a 95-yard kickoff return against the Las Vegas Raiders.

=== 2026 ===
On May 1, 2026, the Giants declined the fifth-year option of Banks' contract, making him a free agent in 2027.

In August 2026, Banks competed with Paulson Adebo for the starting corner job and eventually won it opposite of Greg Newsome II. In Week 4 against the Arizona Cardinals, Banks recorded a 98-yard interception returned for a touchdown along with four tackles and four passes defended and was named NFC Defensive Player of the Week.

== NFL career statistics ==
Legend
	Led the league
**Bold**	Career high

=== Regular season ===
Year	Team	Games		Tackles					Interceptions						Fumbles	
Year	Team	GP	GS	Cmb	Solo	Ast	Sck	TFL	PD	Int	Yds	Avg	Lng	TD	FF	FR
2023	NYG	15	15	**64**	**53**	11	0.0	**2**	11	**2**	**6**	**3.0**	**6**	0	0	0
2024	NYG	14	14	52	39	**13**	0.0	1	**12**	0	0	0.0	0	0	**1**	0
2025	NYG	16	6	31	24	7	0.0	**2**	5	0	0	0.0	0	0	0	0
2026	NYG	7	7	27	16	11	0.0	0	11	1	98	98.0	98	1	0	0
Career		52	42	174	132	42	0.0	5	39	3	104	34.7	98	1	1	0

=== Special teams ===
Year	Team	Games		Punt returns					Kick returns					Yards	
Year	Team	GP	GS	Ret	Yds	Avg	Lng	TD	Ret	Yds	Avg	Lng	TD	K&P	AP
2023	NYG	15	15	0	0	0.0	0	0	0	0	0.0	0	0	0	0
2024	NYG	14	14	0	0	0.0	0	0	0	0	0.0	0	0	0	0
2025	NYG	16	6	0	0	0.0	0	0	**19**	**622**	**32.7**	**95**	**1**	**622**	**622**
2026	NYG	2	2	0	0	0.0	0	0	2	37	18.5	19	0	37	37
Career		47	37	0	0	0.0	0	0	21	659	31.4	95	1	763	763
