= Jakorian Bennett =

American football player (born 2000)

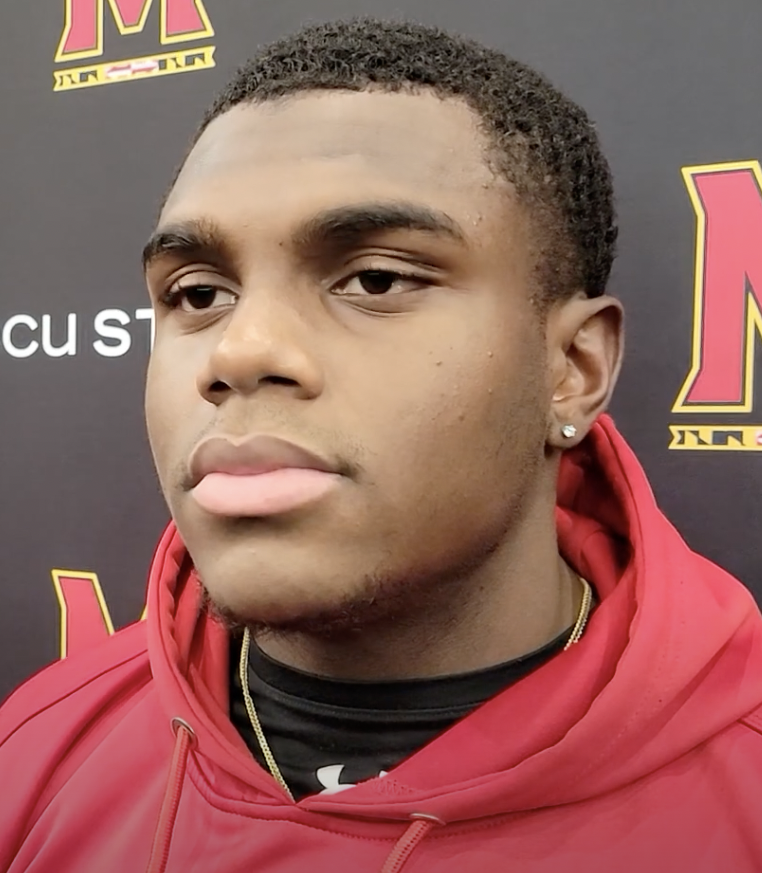
- Bennett in 2022

No. 32 – Carolina Panthers
- Position: Cornerback
- Roster status: Practice squad

Personal information
- Born: August 23, 2000 (age 26); Mobile, Alabama, U.S.
- Listed height: 5 ft 11 in (1.80 m)
- Listed weight: 200 lb (91 kg)

Career information
- High school: McGill-Toolen (Mobile)
- College: Hutchinson CC (2018–2019); Maryland (2020–2022)
- NFL draft: 2023: 4th round, 104th overall pick

Career history
- Las Vegas Raiders (2023–2024); Philadelphia Eagles (2025–2026); Carolina Panthers (2026–present)*
- * Offseason or practice squad member only

Awards and highlights
- Duke's Mayo Bowl MVP (2022); First-team All-KJCCC (2019)

Career NFL statistics as of 2025
- Total tackles: 65
- Pass deflections: 12
- Stats at Pro Football Reference

Jakorian Bennett (born August 23, 2000) is an American professional football cornerback for the Carolina Panthers of the National Football League (NFL). He played college football for the Maryland Terrapins after attending Hutchinson Community College.

== Early life ==
Bennett attended McGill-Toolen Catholic High School in Mobile, Alabama and played corner back on the football team. He was a three-star recruit.

== College career ==
=== Hutchinson Community College ===
Bennett played at Hutchinson Community College for two seasons, recording 25 tackles, three interceptions and three tackles for loss. In 2019, he earned first-team All-Kansas Jayhawk Community College Conference honors.

=== Maryland ===
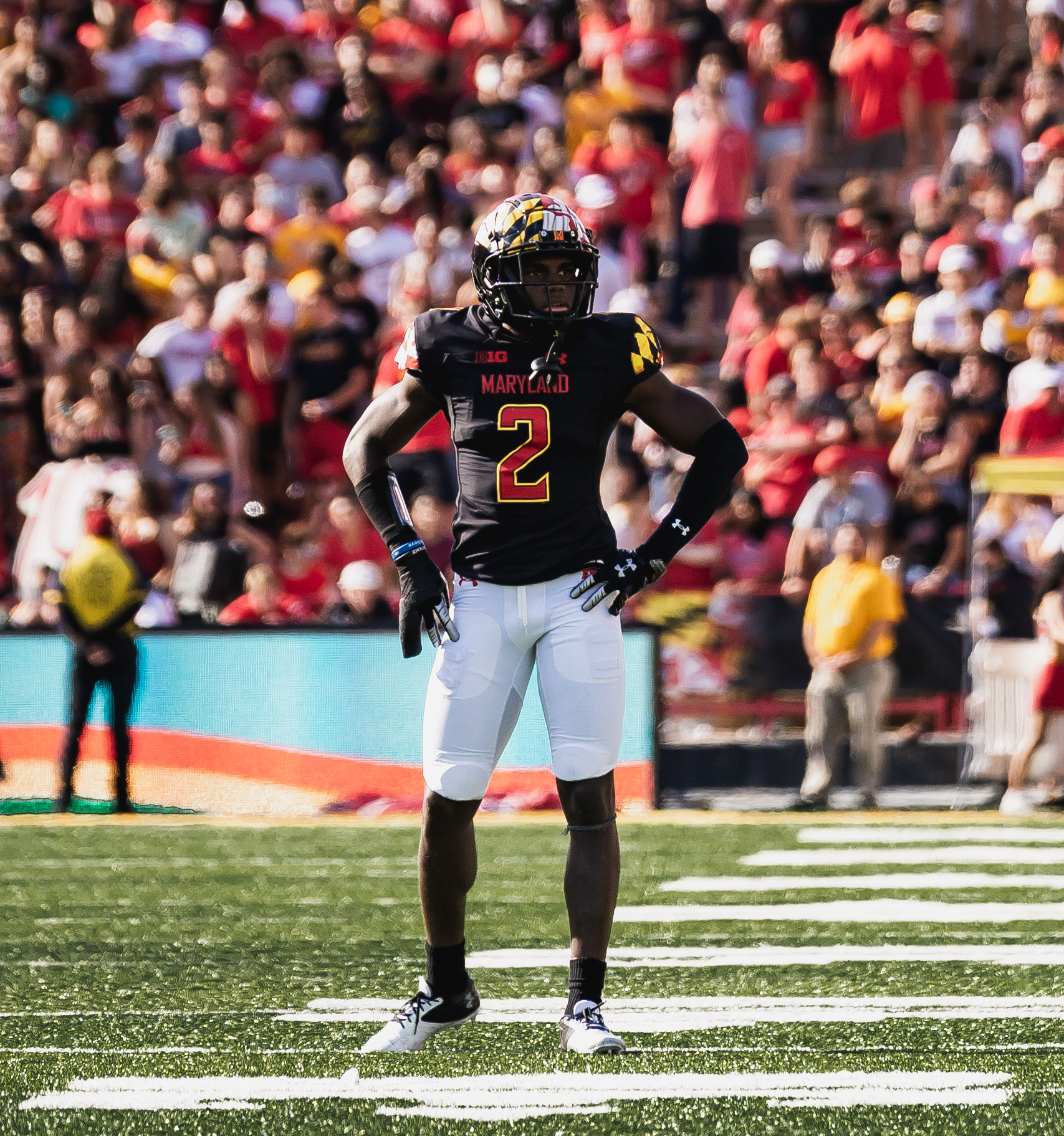
Bennett with Maryland in 2021

On December 17, 2019, Bennett committed to Maryland.

In his first season with the Terps, he played in four games and recorded six tackles, two pass break ups, and one sack. In the 2021 season, he played in all but one game, missing only the Ohio State game due to injury. He led all power five players with 16 pass break ups which was the most since Domonique Foxworth, led the team in interceptions with three, and 24 tackles (23 solo). In the 2022 season opener, Bennett had five pass breakups against Buffalo, and it was the most since Tino Ellis. At the end of the season, he would have 27 pass breakups, the most in the nation, one blocked field goal and one sack.

On December 5, 2022, Bennett declared for the 2023 NFL draft. He was projected to be around a 4th round pick.

== Professional career ==
Pre-draft measurables
Height	Weight	Arm length	Hand span	Wingspan	40-yard dash	10-yard split	20-yard split	Vertical jump	Broad jump	Bench press
5 ft 10 5/8 in (1.79 m)	188 lb (85 kg)	31 7/8 in (0.81 m)	9 1/8 in (0.23 m)	6 ft 5 in (1.96 m)	4.30 s	1.48 s	2.46 s	40.5 in (1.03 m)	11 ft 1 in (3.38 m)	13 reps
All values from NFL Combine

=== Las Vegas Raiders ===
Bennett was selected by the Las Vegas Raiders in the fourth round with the 104th pick of the 2023 NFL draft. In the 2023 season, he appeared in 14 games and started four as a rookie. He finished with 32 total tackes (24 solo) and three passes defended.

=== Philadelphia Eagles ===
On August 5, 2025, Bennett was traded to the Philadelphia Eagles in exchange for defensive tackle Thomas Booker IV. On September 24, Bennett was placed on injured reserve due to a pectoral injury. On November 12, he was activated ahead of the team's Week 11 matchup against the Detroit Lions.

On August 30, 2026, Bennett was placed on injured reserve due to a knee injury. On November 3, he was released from injured reserve.

=== Carolina Panthers ===
On November 6, 2026, Bennett signed with the Carolina Panthers practice squad.
