= Rakim Jarrett =

American football player (born 2001)

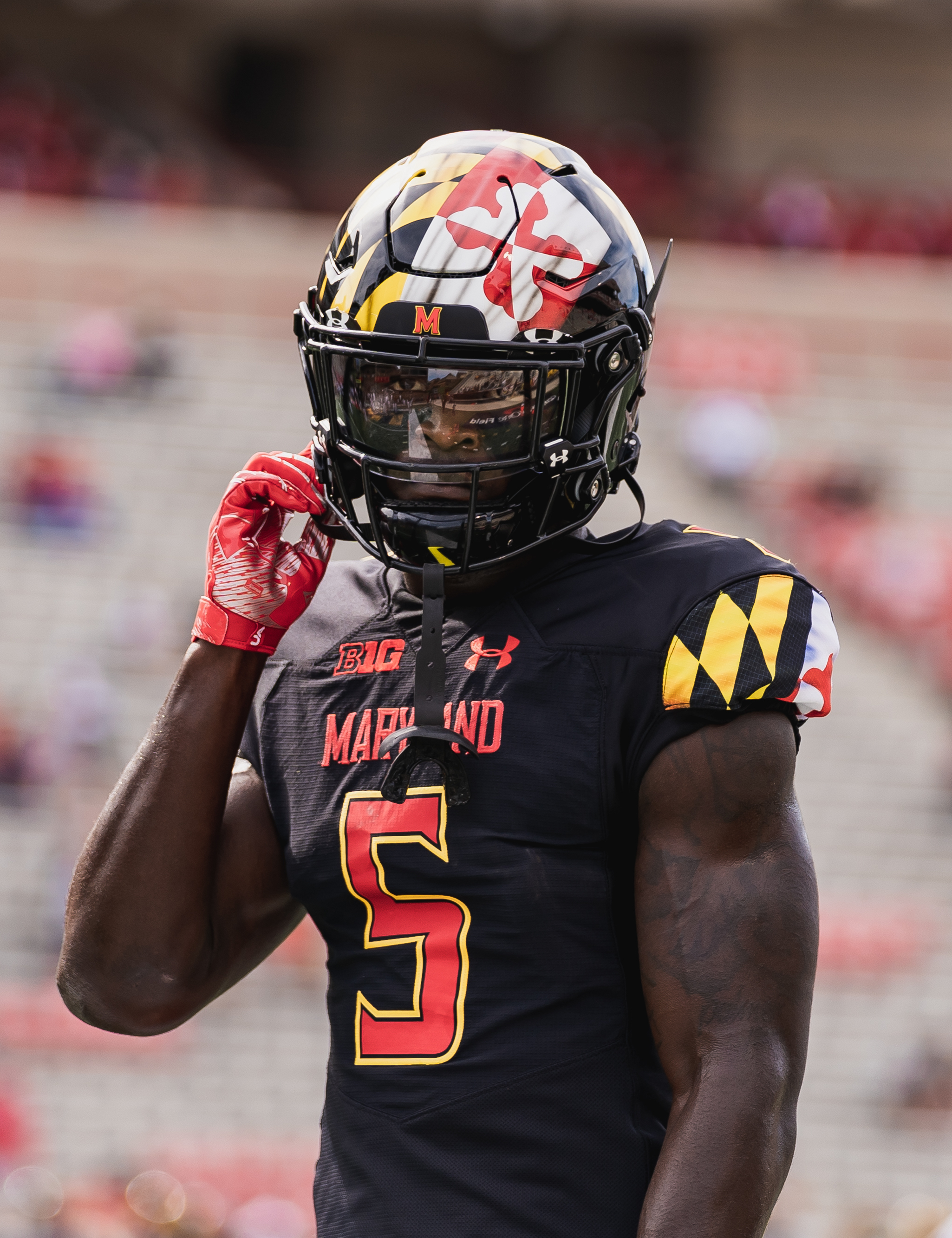
- Jarrett with the Maryland Terrapins in 2021

Profile
- Position: Wide receiver

Personal information
- Born: January 24, 2001 (age 25); Palmer Park, Maryland, U.S.
- Listed height: 6 ft 0 in (1.83 m)
- Listed weight: 192 lb (87 kg)

Career information
- High school: St. John's College (Washington, D.C.)
- College: Maryland (2020–2022)
- NFL draft: 2023: undrafted

Career history
- Tampa Bay Buccaneers (2023–2024); Pittsburgh Steelers (2025)*
- * Offseason or practice squad member only

Career NFL statistics as of 2024
- Receptions: 13
- Receiving yards: 184
- Stats at Pro Football Reference

Rakim Jarrett (born January 24, 2001) is an American professional football wide receiver. He played college football for the Maryland Terrapins and was signed as an undrafted free agent by the Tampa Bay Buccaneers after the 2023 NFL draft.

== Early life ==
Jarrett attended St. John's College High School in Washington, D.C. He was the Gatorade Football Player of the Year for Washington, D.C. his senior year in 2019 after recording 60 receptions for 950 yards and seven touchdowns.

A five-star recruit, Jarrett originally committed to Louisiana State University (LSU) to play college football before switching to the University of Maryland, College Park.

== College career ==
As a true freshman at Maryland in 2020, Jarrett started all four games he played in and had 17 receptions for 252 yards and two touchdowns. As a sophomore in 2021, he started all 13 games and recorded 62 receptions for 829 yards and five touchdowns.

== Professional career ==
Pre-draft measurables
Height	Weight	Arm length	Hand span	Wingspan	40-yard dash	10-yard split	20-yard split	Vertical jump	Broad jump	Bench press
5 ft 11 7/8 in (1.83 m)	192 lb (87 kg)	31 3/8 in (0.80 m)	9 3/8 in (0.24 m)	6 ft 3 7/8 in (1.93 m)	4.44 s	1.51 s	2.57 s	35.5 in (0.90 m)	10 ft 3 in (3.12 m)	13 reps
All values from NFL Combine

=== Tampa Bay Buccaneers ===
Jarrett was signed by the Tampa Bay Buccaneers as an undrafted free agent on May 12, 2023. On August 29, 2023, the Buccaneers announced that he had made the initial 53-man roster. He was placed on injured reserve on November 22. He was activated on January 5, 2024.

Jarrett began the 2024 season on injured reserve, and activated on October 26.

On August 26, 2025, Jarrett was waived by the Buccaneers as part of final roster cuts.

=== Pittsburgh Steelers ===
On September 8, 2025, Jarrett was signed to the Pittsburgh Steelers' practice squad. He was released on September 16.
