= 2023 Maryland Terrapins football team =

American college football season

2023 Maryland Terrapins football

Music City Bowl champion

Music City Bowl, W 31–13 vs. Auburn
- Conference: Big Ten Conference
- East Division
- Record: 8–5 (4–5 Big Ten)
- Head coach: Mike Locksley (5th season)
- Offensive coordinator: Josh Gattis (1st season)
- Co-offensive coordinator: Kevin Sumlin (1st season)
- Offensive scheme: Pro spread
- Defensive coordinator: Brian Williams (2nd season)
- Base defense: 4–3
- Home stadium: SECU Stadium

2023 Big Ten Conference football standings
	Conf.			Overall
Team	W		L	W		L
East Division
No. 1 Michigan xy$#^	9	–	0	15	–	0
No. 10 Ohio State	8	–	1	11	–	2
No. 13 Penn State	7	–	2	10	–	3
Maryland	4	–	5	8	–	5
Rutgers	3	–	6	7	–	6
Indiana	1	–	8	3	–	9
Michigan State†	0	–	7	0	–	8
West Division
No. 24 Iowa xy	7	–	2	10	–	4
Northwestern	5	–	4	8	–	5
Wisconsin	5	–	4	7	–	6
Minnesota	3	–	6	6	–	7
Illinois	3	–	6	5	–	7
Nebraska	3	–	6	5	–	7
Purdue	3	–	6	4	–	8
Championship: Michigan 26, Iowa 0
# – College Football Playoff champion; ^ – College Football Playoff participant; $ – Conference champion; x – Division champion/co-champions; y – Championship game participant; † — NCAA vacated all wins for Michigan State (4–8, 2–7); Rankings from AP Poll

The 2023 Maryland Terrapins football team represented the University of Maryland in the East Division of the Big Ten Conference during the 2023 NCAA Division I FBS football season. The Terrapins were led by Mike Locksley in his fifth year as head coach. They played their home games at SECU Stadium in College Park, Maryland.

== Schedule ==
Date	Time	Opponent	Site	TV	Result	Attendance
September 2	3:30 p.m.	Towson*	SECU Stadium; College Park, MD	BTN	W 38–6	37,241
September 9	7:30 p.m.	Charlotte*	SECU Stadium; College Park, MD	NBC	W 38–20	32,804
September 15	7:00 p.m.	Virginia*	SECU Stadium; College Park, MD (rivalry)	FS1	W 42–14	37,041
September 23	3:30 p.m.	at Michigan State	Spartan Stadium; East Lansing, MI	NBC	W 31–9	70,131
September 30	3:30 p.m.	Indiana	SECU Stadium; College Park, MD	BTN	W 44–17	38,181
October 7	12:00 p.m.	at No. 4 Ohio State	Ohio Stadium; Columbus, OH (Big Noon Kickoff)	FOX	L 17–37	104,974
October 14	3:30 p.m.	Illinois^{†}	SECU Stadium; College Park, MD	NBC	L 24–27	35,580
October 28	12:00 p.m.	at Northwestern	Ryan Field; Evanston, IL	BTN	L 27–33	19,286
November 4	3:30 p.m.	No. 11 Penn State	SECU Stadium; College Park, MD (rivalry)	FOX	L 15–51	51,802
November 11	12:00 p.m.	at Nebraska	Memorial Stadium; Lincoln, NE	Peacock	W 13–10	86,830
November 18	12:00 p.m.	No. 3 Michigan	SECU Stadium; College Park, MD (Big Noon Kickoff)	FOX	L 24–31	49,546
November 25	3:30 p.m.	at Rutgers	SHI Stadium; Piscataway, NJ	BTN	W 42–24	47,012
December 30	2:00 p.m.	vs. Auburn*	Nissan Stadium; Nashville, TN (Music City Bowl)	ABC	W 31–13	50,088
*Non-conference game; ^{†}Homecoming; Rankings from AP Poll (and CFP Rankings, from the date when issued) - Released prior to game; All times are in Eastern time

== Game summaries ==
=== vs Towson ===
Towson Tigers (FCS) (0-0) at Maryland Terrapins (0-0) – Game summary

Quarter	1	2	3	4	Total
Tigers (FCS)	0	3	3	0	6
Terrapins	21	7	7	3	38

at SECU Stadium • College Park, Maryland

- Date: September 2
- Game time: 3:30 p.m. EDT/12:30 p.m. PDT
- Game attendance: 37,241
- Referee: Tim O'Dey
- TV announcers (BTN): Joe Beninati (play-by-play), Anthony Herron (analyst), and Justine Ward (sideline)

Game information

First quarter

- 12:06 MD - Taulia Tagovailoa 23-yard run (Jack Howes kick) - 7-0 Maryland, Drive: 7 plays, 87 yards, 2:54
- 4:29 MD - Corey Dyches 23-yard pass from Taulia Tagovailoa (Jack Howes kick) - 14-0 Maryland, Drive: 5 plays, 54 yards, 2:38
- 0:17 MD - Jeshaun Jones 24-yard pass from Taulia Tagovailoa (Jack Howes kick) - 21-0 Maryland, Drive: 7 plays, 52 yards, 2:43

Second quarter

- 11:57 TOW - Keegan Vaughan 36-yard field goal - 21-3 Maryland, Drive: 9 plays, 57 yards, 3:20
- 0:14 MD - Kaden Prather 13-yard pass from Taulia Tagovailoa (Jack Howes kick) - 28-3 Maryland, Drive: 15 plays, 91 yards, 3:47

Third quarter

- 9:26 MD - Roman Hemby 9-yard run (Jack Howes kick) - 35-3 Maryland, Drive: 8 plays, 72 yards, 4:08
- 1:33 TOW - Keegan Vaughan 38-yard field goal - 35-6 Maryland, Drive: 16 plays, 53 yards, 7:53

Fourth quarter

- 5:38 MD - Evan Johnson 24-yard field goal - 38-6 Maryland, Drive: 17 plays, 62 yards, 7:23

Statistics	Towson (FCS)	Maryland
First downs	16	30
Plays–yards	65-276	79-449
Rushes–yards	34-148	36-166
Passing yards	128	283
Passing: comp–att–int	16-31-0	26-43-0
Turnovers		
Time of possession	26:52	33:08

Team	Category	Player	Statistics
Towson (FCS)	Passing	Nathan Kent	16/31, 128 yards
Towson (FCS)	Rushing	Devin Matthews	12 carries, 48 yards
Towson (FCS)	Receiving	Da'Kendall James	4 receptions, 49 yards
Maryland	Passing	Taulia Tagovailoa	22/33, 260 yards, 3 TDs
Maryland	Rushing	Roman Hemby	12 carries, 58 yards, 1 TD
Maryland	Receiving	Corey Dyches	6 receptions, 108 yards, 1 TD

=== vs Charlotte ===
Charlotte 49ers (1-0) at Maryland Terrapins (1-0) – Game summary

Quarter	1	2	3	4	Total
49ers	14	0	0	6	20
Terrapins	0	9	8	21	38

at SECU Stadium • College Park, Maryland

- Date: September 9
- Game time: 7:30 p.m. EDT/4:30 p.m. PDT
- Game weather: 75 °F (24 °C) • Weather: Sunny• Wind: 6 SE MPH
- Game attendance: 32,804
- Referee: Nate Black
- TV announcers (NBC): Noah Eagle (play-by-play), Todd Blackledge (analyst), and Kathryn Tappen (sideline)

Game information

First quarter

- 12:00 CHAR - Jairus Mack 48-yard pass from Jalon Jones (Kyle Cunanan kick) - 7-0 Charlotte, Drive: 5 plays, 75 yards, 3:00
- 11:50 CHAR - Demetrius Knight II 16-yard interception return (Kyle Cunanan kick) - 14-0 Charlotte, Drive: 1 play, 0 yards, 0:06

Second quarter

- 11:09 MD - Jack Howes 32-yard field goal - 14-3 Charlotte, Drive: 11 plays, 72 yards, 3:57
- 3:25 MD - Jack Howes 38-yard field goal - 14-6 Charlotte, Drive: 10 plays, 51 yards, 4:09
- 0:00 MD - Jack Howes 45-yard field goal - 14-9 Charlotte, Drive: 7 plays, 53 yards, 1:08

Third quarter

- 9:18 MD - Billy Edwards Jr. 1-yard run (Taulia Tagovailoa pass to Tai Felton for two-point conversion) - 17-14 Maryland, Drive: 9 plays, 75 yards, 5:42

Fourth quarter

- 11:55 MD - Colby McDonald 23-yard run (Jack Howes kick) - 24-14 Maryland, Drive: 10 plays, 83 yards, 4:11
- 8:06 MD - Kaden Prather 40-yard pass from Taulia Tagovailoa (Jack Howes kick) - 31-14 Maryland, Drive: 3 plays, 55 yards, 1:16
- 4:35 MD - Roman Hemby 15-yard run (Jack Howes kick) - 38-14 Maryland, Drive: 4 plays, 43 yards, 1:26
- 1:22 CHAR - Joachim Bangda 1-yard run (Trexler Ivey two-point pass conversion incomplete) - 38-20 Maryland, Drive: 9 plays, 75 yards, 3:13

Statistics	Charlotte	Maryland
First downs	16	27
Plays–yards	54-314	70-530
Rushes–yards	34-125	34-243
Passing yards	189	287
Passing: comp–att–int	13-20-1	25-36-2
Turnovers		
Time of possession	30:17	29:43

Team	Category	Player	Statistics
Charlotte	Passing	Jalon Jones	8/15, 116 yards, 1 TD, 1 INT
Charlotte	Rushing	Jalon Jones	16 carries, 67 yards
Charlotte	Receiving	Jairus Mack	4 receptions, 106 yards, 1 TD
Maryland	Passing	Taulia Tagovailoa	25/36, 287 yards, 1 TD, 2 INT
Maryland	Rushing	Roman Hemby	19 carries, 162 yards, 1 TD
Maryland	Receiving	Kaden Prather	4 receptions, 80 yards, 1 TD

=== vs Virginia ===
Virginia Cavaliers (0-2) at Maryland Terrapins (2-0) – Game summary

Quarter	1	2	3	4	Total
Cavaliers	14	0	0	0	14
Terrapins	7	7	7	21	42

at SECU Stadium • College Park, Maryland

- Date: September 15th
- Game time: 3:30 p.m. EDT/12:30 p.m. PDT
- Game attendance: 37,041
- Referee: Mike Roche
- TV announcers (FS1): Eric Collins (play-by-play) and Devin Gardner (analyst)

Game information

First quarter

- 12:25 UVA - Perris Jones 13-yard run (Will Bettridge kick) - 7-0 Virginia, Drive: 3 plays, 65 yards, 1:20
- 4:16 UVA - Kobe Pace 19-yard pass from Anthony Colandrea (Will Bettridge kick) - 14-0 Virginia, Drive: 7 plays, 63 yards, 3:59
- 4:03 MD - Braeden Wisloski 98-yard kickoff return (Jack Howes kick) - 14-7 Virginia, Drive: 0 plays, 0 yards, 0:00

Second quarter

- 1:23 MD - Roman Hemby 3-yard run (Jack Howes kick) - 14-14, Drive: 14 plays, 97 yards, 6:23

Third quarter

- 9:47 MD - Jeshaun Jones 64-yard pass from Taulia Tagovailoa (Jack Howes kick) - 21-14 Maryland, Drive: 6 plays, 85 yards, 2:39

Fourth quarter

- 11:10 MD - Roman Hemby 3-yard run (Jack Howes kick) - 28-14 Maryland, Drive: 9 plays, 80 yards, 3:34
- 10:25 MD - Antwain Littleton II 2-yard run (Jack Howes kick) - 35-14 Maryland, Drive: 3 plays, 30 yards, 0:37
- 5:58 MD - Colby McDonald 1-yard run (Jack Howes kick) - 42-14 Maryland, Drive: 6 plays, 56 yards, 3:18

Statistics	Virginia	Maryland
First downs	25	20
Plays–yards	69-354	61-461
Rushes–yards	30-91	31-119
Passing yards	263	342
Passing: comp–att–int	23-39-3	19-30-0
Turnovers		
Time of possession	31:27	28:33

Team	Category	Player	Statistics
Virginia	Passing	Anthony Colandrea	23/39, 263 yards, 1 TD, 3 INT
Virginia	Rushing	Perris Jones	9 carries, 37 yards, 1 TD
Virginia	Receiving	Malik Washington	9 receptions, 141 yards
Maryland	Passing	Taulia Tagovailoa	19/30, 342 yards, 1 TD
Maryland	Rushing	Colby McDonald	10 carries, 75 yards, 1 TD
Maryland	Receiving	Jeshaun Jones	5 receptions, 96 yards, 1 TD

=== at Michigan State ===
Maryland Terrapins (3-0) at Michigan State Spartans (2-1) – Game summary

Quarter	1	2	3	4	Total
Terrapins	7	14	0	10	31
Spartans	0	3	6	0	9

at Spartan Stadium • East Lansing, Michigan

- Date: September 23rd
- Game time: 3:30 p.m. EDT/12:30 p.m. PDT
- Game weather: 74 °F (23 °C), Wind: 10 mph W, Sunny
- Game attendance: 70,131
- Referee: Rod Snodgrass
- TV announcers (NBC): Jac Collinsworth (play-by-play), Jason Garrett (analyst), and Zora Stephenson (sideline)

Game information

First quarter

- 7:52 MD - Sean Greeley 1-yard pass from Taulia Tagovailoa (Jack Howes kick) - 7-0 Maryland, Drive: 9 plays, 45 yards, 4:24

Second quarter

- 11:28 MD - Tyrese Chambers 12-yard pass from Taulia Tagovailoa (Jack Howes kick) - 14-0 Maryland, Drive: 11 plays, 95 yards, 3:40
- 8:39 MD - Taulia Tagovailoa 1-yard run (Jack Howes kick) - 21-0 Maryland, Drive: 5 plays, 32 yards, 1:48
- 3:39 MSU - Jonathan Kim 37-yard field goal - 21-3 Maryland, Drive: 10 plays, 56 yards, 5:00

Third quarter

- 3:44 MSU - Tyrell Henry 9-yard pass from Noah Kim (Noah Kim two-point pass incomplete) - 21-9 Maryland, Drive: 9 plays, 80 yards, 3:46

Fourth quarter

- 11:00 MD - Jack Howes 48-yard field goal - 24-9 Maryland, Drive: 4 plays, 2 yards, 1:33
- 3:18 MD - Octavian Smith Jr. 31-yard pass from Taulia Tagovailoa - 31-9 Maryland, Drive: 7 plays, 81 yards, 2:30

Statistics	Maryland	Michigan State
First downs	18	25
Plays–yards	67-362	75-376
Rushes–yards	31-139	31-102
Passing yards	223	274
Passing: comp–att–int	21-36-1	26-44-3
Turnovers		
Time of possession	28:36	31:24

Team	Category	Player	Statistics
Maryland	Passing	Taulia Tagovailoa	21/36, 223 yards, 3 TD, 1 INT
Maryland	Rushing	Colby McDonald	5 carries, 38 yards
Maryland	Receiving	Tai Felton	3 receptions, 67 yards
Michigan State	Passing	Noah Kim	18/32, 190 yards, 1 TD, 2 INT
Michigan State	Rushing	Nate Carter	19 carries, 97 yards
Michigan State	Receiving	Montorie Foster Jr.	6 receptions, 67 yards

=== vs Indiana ===
Indiana Hoosiers (2-2) at Maryland Terrapins (4-0) – Game summary

Quarter	1	2	3	4	Total
Hoosiers	3	0	0	14	17
Terrapins	21	6	10	7	44

at SECU Stadium • College Park, Maryland

- Date: September 30th
- Game time: 3:30 p.m. EDT/12:30 p.m. PDT
- Game attendance: 38,181
- Referee: Jerry McGinn
- TV announcers (BTN): Connor Onion (play-by-play), Matt Millen (analyst), and Elise Menaker (sideline)

Game information

First quarter

- 14:35 MD - Tai Felton 13-yard pass from Taulia Tagovailoa (Jack Howes kick) - 7-0 Maryland, Drive: 3 plays, 75 yards, 0:25
- 9:54 IND - Chris Freeman 25-yard field goal - 7-3 Maryland, Drive: 8 plays, 32 yards, 4:31
- 5:34 MD - Tai Felton 29-yard pass from Taulia Tagovailoa (Jack Howes kick) - 14-3 Maryland, Drive: 1 play, 29 yards, 0:05
- 2:43 MD - Taulia Tagovailoa 19-yard run (Jack Howes kick) - 21-3 Maryland, Drive: 2 plays, 21 yards, 0:46

Second quarter

- 0:36 MD - Tai Felton 9-yard pass from Taulia Tagovailoa (Jack Howes kick missed) - 27-3 Maryland, Drive: 5 plays, 50 yards, 0:26

Third quarter

- 11:23 MD - Jack Howes 44-yard field goal - 30-3 Maryland, Drive: 4 plays, 6 yards, 2:04
- 7:08 MD - Dylan Wade 3-yard pass from Taulia Tagovailoa (Jack Howes kick) - 37-3 Maryland, Drive: 5 plays, 71 yards, 1:31

Fourth quarter

- 11:07 IND - Donaven McCulley 11-yard pass from Brendan Sorsby (Chris Freeman kick) - 37-10 Maryland, Drive: 7 plays, 47 yards, 3:30
- 6:54 MD - Kaden Prather 14-yard pass from Taulia Tagovailoa (Jack Howes kick) - 44-10 Maryland, Drive: 9 plays, 75 yards, 4:13
- 0:25 IND - Andison Coby 16-yard pass from Brendan Sorsby (Chris Freeman kick) - 44-17 Maryland, Drive: 13 plays, 75 yards, 6:29

Statistics	Indiana	Maryland
First downs	20	20
Plays–yards	78-321	57-472
Rushes–yards	37-116	23-120
Passing yards	205	352
Passing: comp–att–int	25-41-1	24-34-0
Turnovers		
Time of possession	38:04	21:56

Team	Category	Player	Statistics
Indiana	Passing	Tayven Jackson	17/29, 113 yards, 1 INT
Indiana	Rushing	Christian Turner	15 carries, 61 yards
Indiana	Receiving	Donaven McCulley	6 receptions, 79 yards, 1 TD
Maryland	Passing	Taulia Tagovailoa	24/34, 352 yards, 5 TD
Maryland	Rushing	Roman Hemby	14 carries, 54 yards
Maryland	Receiving	Tai Felton	7 receptions, 134 yards, 3 TD

=== at No. 4 Ohio State ===
Maryland Terrapins (5-0) at No. 4 Ohio State Buckeyes (4-0) – Game summary

Quarter	1	2	3	4	Total
Maryland	7	3	7	0	17
No. 4 Ohio State	0	10	10	17	37

at Ohio Stadium • Columbus, Ohio

- Date: October 7
- Game time: 12:00 p.m. EDT/9:00 a.m. PDT
- Game weather: Temperature: 54 °F (12 °C) • Wind: NW at 12 miles per hour (19 km/h) • Weather: Cloudy
- Game attendance: 104,974
- Referee: Chris Coyle
- TV announcers (FOX): Gus Johnson (play-by-play), Joel Klatt (analyst), Jenny Taft (sideline reporter)

Game information

First quarter

- 12:41 MD - Kaden Prather 15-yard pass from Taulia Tagovailoa (Jack Howes kick) - 7-0 Maryland, Drive: 4 plays, 30 yards, 1:28

Second quarter

- 12:56 MD - Jack Howes 21-yard field goal - 10-0 Maryland, Drive: 12 plays, 60 yards, 5:07
- 9:41 OSU - Josh Proctor 24-yard interception return (Jayden Fielding kick) - 10-7 Maryland, Drive: 3 plays, 5 yards, 1:16
- 1:32 OSU - Jayden Fielding 36-yard field goal - 10-10, Drive: 6 plays, 72 yards, 2:43

Third quarter

- 11:03 MD - Taulia Tagovailoa 9-yard run (Jack Howes kick) - 17-10 Maryland, Drive: 9 plays, 75 yards, 3:57
- 8:56 OSU - Chip Trayanum 4-yard run (Jayden Fielding kick) - 17-17, Drive: 4 plays, 76 yards, 2:01
- 2:19 OSU - Jayden Fielding 24-yard field goal - 20-17 Ohio State, Drive: 9 plays, 33 yards, 3:49

Fourth quarter

- 10:16 OSU - Cade Stover 44-yard pass from Kyle McCord (Jayden Fielding kick) - 27-17 Ohio State, Drive: 8 plays, 75 yards, 4:37
- 7:01 OSU - Marvin Harrison Jr. 17-yard pass from Kyle McCord (Jayden Fielding kick) - 34-17 Ohio State, Drive: 3 plays, 17 yards, 1:32
- 2:10 OSU - Jayden Fielding 41-yard field goal - 37-17 Ohio State, Drive: 8 plays, 27 yards, 3:22

Statistics	Maryland	No. 4 Ohio State
First downs	20	21
Plays–yards	76-302	62-382
Rushes–yards	35-106	33-62
Passing yards	196	320
Passing: comp–att–int	21-41-2	19-29-0
Turnovers		
Time of possession	30:04	29:56

Team	Category	Player	Statistics
Maryland	Passing	Taulia Tagovailoa	21/41, 196 yards, 1 TD, 2 INT
Maryland	Rushing	Antwain Littleton II	11 carries, 38 yards
Maryland	Receiving	Jeshaun Jones	5 receptions, 59 yards
No. 4 Ohio State	Passing	Kyle McCord	19/29, 320 yards, 2 TD
No. 4 Ohio State	Rushing	Chip Trayanum	20 carries, 61 yards, 1 TD
No. 4 Ohio State	Receiving	Marvin Harrison Jr.	8 receptions, 163 yards, 1 TD

=== vs Illinois ===
Illinois Fighting Illini (2-4) at Maryland Terrapins (5-1) – Game summary

Quarter	1	2	3	4	Total
Fighting Illini	7	7	10	3	27
Terrapins	7	7	7	3	24

at SECU Stadium • College Park, Maryland

- Date: October 14
- Game time: 3:30 p.m. EDT/12:30 p.m. PDT
- Game weather: Rainy • Temperature: 60 °F (16 °C) • Wind: 4 mph SE
- Game attendance: 35,580
- Referee: Mark Kluczynski
- TV announcers (NBC): Noah Eagle (play-by-play), Todd Blackledge (analyst), and Kathryn Tappen (sideline)

Game information

First quarter

- 8:20 ILL - Pat Bryant 44-yard pass from Luke Altmyer (Caleb Griffin kick) - 7-0 Illinois, Drive: 7 plays, 85 yards, 3:24
- 0:06 MD - Sean Greeley 4-yard pass from Taulia Tagovailoa (Jack Howes kick) - 7-7, Drive: 7 plays, 52 yards, 3:31

Second quarter

- 5:46 MD - Kaden Prather 27-yard pass from Taulia Tagovailoa (Jack Howes kick) - 14-7 Maryland, Drive: 9 plays, 73 yards, 1:28
- 0:09 ILL - Kaden Feagin 2-yard run (Caleb Griffin kick) - 14-14, Drive: 9 plays, 73 yards, 1:28

Third quarter

- 10:33 ILL - Isaiah Williams 15-yard pass from Luke Altmyer (Caleb Griffin kick) - 21-14 Illinois, Drive: 8 plays, 59 yards, 4:22
- 4:18 ILL - Caleb Griffin 40-yard field goal - 24-14 Illinois, Drive: 8 plays, 51 yards, 2:54
- 0:00 MD - Antwain Littleton II 4-yard run (Jack Howes kick) - 24-21 Illinois, Drive: 11 plays, 65 yards, 4:18

Fourth quarter

- 1:31 MD - Jack Howes 48-yard field goal - 24-24, Drive: 6 plays, 38 yards, 2:43
- 0:00 ILL - Caleb Griffin 43-yard field goal - 27-24 Illinois, Drive: 7 plays, 50 yards, 1:31

Statistics	Illinois	Maryland
First downs	22	22
Plays–yards	67-337	69-380
Rushes–yards	39-131	29-93
Passing yards	206	287
Passing: comp–att–int	16-28-1	28-40-0
Turnovers		
Time of possession	29:18	30:42

Team	Category	Player	Statistics
Illinois	Passing	Luke Altmyer	16/28, 206 yards, 2 TD, 1 INT
Illinois	Rushing	Kaden Feagin	19 carries, 84 yards, 1 TD
Illinois	Receiving	Pat Bryant	3 receptions, 61 yards, 1 TD
Maryland	Passing	Taulia Tagovailoa	27/39, 266 yards, 2 TD
Maryland	Rushing	Roman Hemby	12 carries, 70 yards
Maryland	Receiving	Kaden Prather	6 receptions, 70 yards, 1 TD

=== at Northwestern ===
Maryland Terrapins (5-2) at Northwestern Wildcats (3-4) – Game summary

Quarter	1	2	3	4	Total
Terrapins	14	3	3	7	27
Wildcats	14	10	3	6	33

at Ryan Field • Evanston, Illinois

- Date: October 28th
- Game time: 12:00 p.m. EDT/9:00 a.m. PDT
- Referee: Gregory Blum
- TV announcers (Big Ten Network): TBD

Game information

First quarter

- 12:44 MD - Tai Felton 8-yard pass from Taulia Tagovailoa (Jack Howes kick) - 7-0 Maryland, Drive: 5 plays, 66 yards, 2:10
- 8:50 NW - Cam Porter 1-yard run (Jack Olsen kick) - 7-7, Drive: 3 plays, 12 yards, 1:06
- 5:34 MD - Roman Hemby 24-yard pass from Taulia Tagovailoa (Jack Howes kick) - 14-7 Maryland, Drive: 8 plays, 45 yards, 3:07
- 2:42 NW - Bryce Kirtz 23-yard pass from Brendan Sullivan (Jack Olsen kick) - 14-14, Drive: 6 plays, 69 yards, 2:48

Second quarter

- 12:17 NW - Cam Porter 3-yard pass from Brendan Sullivan (Jack Olsen kick) - 21-14 Northwestern, Drive: 10 plays, 97 yards, 3:58
- 1:18 NW - Jack Olsen 33-yard field goal - 24-14 Northwestern, Drive: 12 plays, 84 yards, 4:57
- 0:10 MD - Jack Howes 34-yard field goal - 24-17 Northwestern, Drive: 8 plays, 59 yards, 1:08

Third quarter

- 13:29 NW - Jack Olsen 47-yard field goal - 27-17 Northwestern, Drive: 4 plays, 3 yards, 1:22
- 4:45 MD - Jack Howes 22-yard field goal - 27-20 Northwestern, Drive: 12 plays, 38 yards, 5:41

Fourth quarter

- 9:19 NW - Jack Olsen 19-yard field goal - 30-20 Northwestern, Drive: 10 plays, 67 yards, 4:35
- 5:03 NW - Jack Olsen 29-yard field goal - 33-20 Northwestern, Drive: 6 plays, 49 yards, 3:07
- 3:42 MD - Jeshaun Jones 18-yard pass from Taulia Tagovailoa (Jack Howes kick) - 33-27 Northwestern, Drive: 4 plays, 61 yards, 1:20

Statistics	Maryland	Northwestern
First downs	25	19
Plays–yards	74-391	63-364
Rushes–yards	27-117	40-99
Passing yards	274	265
Passing: comp–att–int	30-47-1	16-23-0
Turnovers		
Time of possession	29:13	30:47

Team	Category	Player	Statistics
Maryland	Passing	Taulia Tagovailoa	30/47, 274 yards, 3 TD, 1 INT
Maryland	Rushing	Colby McDonald	5 carries, 43 yards
Maryland	Receiving	Jeshaun Jones	9 receptions, 78 yards, 1 TD
Northwestern	Passing	Brendan Sullivan	16/23, 265 yards, 2 TD
Northwestern	Rushing	Brendan Sullivan	14 carries, 56 yards
Northwestern	Receiving	Joseph Himon II	2 receptions, 67 yards

=== vs No. 11 Penn State ===
Penn State Nittany Lions (7-1) at Maryland Terrapins (5-3) – Game summary

Quarter	1	2	3	4	Total
No. 11 Nittany Lions	14	7	3	27	51
Terrapins	0	7	0	8	15

at SECU Stadium • College Park, Maryland

- Date: November 4th
- Game time: 3:30 p.m. EDT/12:30 p.m. PDT
- Game weather: 68 °F (20 °C), clear
- Game attendance: 51,802
- Referee: Jeffrey Servinski
- TV announcers (FOX): Jason Benetti, Brock Huard, and Allison Williamns
- ESPN box score

Game information

First quarter

- PSU – Dante Cephas, 6-yard TD pass from Drew Allar, Alex Felkins kick, 8:41 (PSU 7–0)
- PSU – Theo Johnson, 2-yard TD pass from Allar, Felkins kick, 0:02 (PSU 14–0)

Second quarter

- UM – Roman Hemby, 7-yard TD pass from Taulia Tagovailoa, Jack Howes kick, 7:59 (PSU 14–7)
- PSU – Tyler Warren, 8-yard TD pass from Allar, Felkins kick, 2:34 (PSU 21–7)

Third quarter

- PSU – Felkins, 30-yard field goal, 9:26 (PSU 24–7)

Fourth quarter

- PSU – Cephas, 15-yard TD pass from Allar, Felkins kick, 13:55 (PSU 31–7)
- UM – Jeshaun Jones, 1-yard TD pass from Tagovailoa, Antwain Littleton II run for 2-point conversion, 11:27 (PSU 31–15)
- PSU – Kaytron Allen, 10-yard TD run, Felkins kick, 9:14 (PSU 38–15)
- PSU – Felkins, 35-yard field goal, 7:38 (PSU 41–15)
- PSU – Felkins, 39-yard field goal, 2:51 (PSU 44–15)
- PSU – Beau Pribula, 6-yard TD run, Felkins kick, 1:25 (PSU 51–15)

Statistics	Penn State	Maryland
First downs	25	15
Plays–yards	76–404	58–234
Rushes–yards	37–158	16–(-49)
Passing yards	246	283
Passing: comp–att–int	26–39–0	31–42–2
Turnovers		
Time of possession	37:14	22:46

Team	Category	Player	Statistics
Penn State	Passing	Drew Allar	25/34, 240 yards, 4 TD
Penn State	Rushing	Kaytron Allen	14 carries, 91 yards, TD
Penn State	Receiving	KeAndre Lambert-Smith	8 receptions, 95 yards
Maryland	Passing	Taulia Tagovailoa	29/39, 286 yards, 2 TD, INT
Maryland	Rushing	Billy Edwards Jr.	1 carry, 4 yards
Maryland	Receiving	Tai Felton	4 receptions, 75 yards

=== at Nebraska ===
Maryland Terrapins (6-4) at Nebraska Cornhuskers (5-5) – Game summary

Quarter	1	2	3	4	Total
Terrapins	0	7	0	6	13
Cornhuskers	0	0	10	0	10

at Memorial Stadium • Lincoln, Nebraska

- Date: November 11th
- Game time: 12:00 p.m. EST/9:00 a.m. PST
- Game weather: Sunny, 55 °F (13 °C), Wind: S 16 mph
- Game attendance: 86,830
- Referee: Bryan Banks
- TV announcers (Peacock): Paul Burmeister (play-by-play), Kyle Rudolph (analyst), Lewis Johnson (sidelines)

Game information

First quarter

None

Second Quarter

- (2:31) MD – Tai Felton 16-yard pass from Taulia Tagovailoa, Jack Howes kick (2 plays, 69 yards, 0:33, Maryland 7-0)

Third Quarter

- (11:35) NEB - Janiran Bonner 2-yard rush, Tristan Alvano kick (6 plays, 27 yards, 2:23, 7-7)
- (8:26) NEB - Tristan Alvano 38-yard field goal (6 plays, 11 yards, 2:25, Nebraska 10-7)

Fourth Quarter

- (12:42) MD – Jack Howes 35-yard field goal (4 plays, 3 yards, 2:12, 10-10)
- (0:00) MD - Jack Howes 24-yard field goal (12 plays, 75 yards, 3:37, Maryland 13-10)

Statistics	Maryland	Nebraska
First downs	19	18
Plays–yards	384	269
Rushes–yards	26–101	40–183
Passing yards	283	86
Passing: comp–att–int	27–40–1	10–21–4
Turnovers		
Time of possession	28:59	31:01

Team	Category	Player	Statistics
Maryland	Passing	Taulia Tagovailoa	27/40, 283 yards, TD, INT
Maryland	Rushing	Roman Hemby	16 carries, 74 yards
Maryland	Receiving	Jeshaun Jones	5 receptions, 86 yards
Nebraska	Passing	Jeff Sims	8/13, 62 yards, 2 INT
Nebraska	Rushing	Emmett Johnson	17 carries, 84 yards
Nebraska	Receiving	Billy Kemp IV	2 receptions, 30 yards

=== vs Michigan ===
On November 10, Big Ten commissioner Tony Petitti suspended Michigan head coach Jim Harbaugh from game-day coaching for the remainder of the regular season as punishment for the Michigan Wolverines football sign-stealing scandal. Michigan filed an application for temporary restraining order (TRO), challenging the suspension. The court set the matter for a hearing on November 17, one day before Michigan faces Maryland.

Michigan Wolverines (11-0) at Maryland Terrapins (6-5) – Game summary

Quarter	1	2	3	4	Total
No. 3 Wolverines	16	7	6	2	31
Terrapins	3	7	14	0	24

at SECU Stadium • College Park, Maryland

- Date: November 18th
- Game time: 12:00 p.m. EST/9:00 a.m. PST
- Game weather: 55 °F (13 °C), sunny, NW 15 miles per hour (24 km/h)
- Game attendance: 49,546
- Referee: Larry Smith
- TV announcers (FOX): Gus Johnson, Joel Klatt, and Jenny Taft

Game information

First quarter

Second quarter

Third quarter

Fourth quarter

Statistics	UM	UMD
First downs	20	17
Plays–yards	68–291	64–262
Rushes–yards	45–150	33–19
Passing yards	141	247
Passing: comp–att–int	12–23–1	21–31–2
Turnovers		
Time of possession	30:56	29:04

Team	Category	Player	Statistics
Michigan	Passing	J. J. McCarthy	12/23, 141 yards, INT
Michigan	Rushing	Blake Corum	28 carries, 94 yards, 2 TD
Michigan	Receiving	Colston Loveland	3 receptions, 36 yards
Maryland	Passing	Taulia Tagovailoa	21/31, 247 yards, 2 INT
Maryland	Rushing	Roman Hemby	11 carries, 35 yards
Maryland	Receiving	Kaden Prather	3 receptions, 81 yards

=== at Rutgers ===
Maryland Terrapins (7-5) at Rutgers Scarlet Knights (6-6) – Game summary

Quarter	1	2	3	4	Total
Terrapins	21	7	7	7	42
Scarlet Knights	3	14	0	7	24

at SHI Stadium • Piscataway, New Jersey

- Date: November 25th
- Game time: 3:30 p.m. EST/12:30 p.m. PST
- TV announcers (TBD): TBD

Game information

First quarter

Second quarter

Third quarter

Fourth quarter

Statistics	Maryland	Rutgers
First downs	24	20
Plays–yards	59-498	79-355
Rushes–yards	28-137	45-190
Passing yards	361	165
Passing: comp–att–int	24-31-1	13-34-1
Turnovers		
Time of possession	25:39	34:21

Team	Category	Player	Statistics
Maryland	Passing	Taulia Tagovailoa	24/31, 361 yards, 3 TD, 1 INT
Maryland	Rushing	Roman Hemby	15 carries, 113 yards
Maryland	Receiving	Tai Felton	5 receptions, 140 yards, 1 TD
Rutgers	Passing	Gavin Wimsatt	13/34, 165 yards, 1 TD, 1 INT
Rutgers	Rushing	Kyle Monangai	20 carries, 118 yards
Rutgers	Receiving	Isaiah Washington	3 receptions, 67 yards

=== vs Auburn ===
2023 TransPerfect Music City Bowl

Quarter	1	2	3	4	Total
Auburn	0	7	0	6	13
Maryland	21	3	7	0	31

at Nissan Stadium • Nashville, Tennessee

- Date: Saturday, December 30, 2023
- Game time: 2:00 p.m. EST
- Game weather: Cloudy • Temperature: 40 °F (4 °C) • Wind: 9 mph (14 km/h) SW
- Game attendance: 50,088
- Referee: David Alvarez
- TV announcers (ABC): Taylor Zarzour (play-by-play), Matt Stinchcomb (analyst), Alyssa Lang (sideline reporter)
- Box score

Game information

First quarter

- (13:11) MD – Billy Edwards Jr. 2 yard run, Jack Howes kick (Drive: 5 plays, 75 yards, 1:49; Maryland 7–0)
- (5:58) MD – Preston Howard 5 yard pass from Billy Edwards Jr., Jack Howes kick (Drive: 11 plays, 75 yards, 5:26; Maryland 14–0)
- (3:24) MD – Dylan Wade 3 yard pass from Cameron Edge, Jack Howes kick (Drive: 3 plays, 76 yards, 1:26; Maryland 21–0)

Second quarter

- (2:34) AUB – Brandon Frazier 3-yard pass from Payton Thorne, Alex McPherson kick (Drive: 14 plays, 80 yards, 4:56; Maryland 21–7)
- (0:08) MD – Jack Howes 49 yard field goal (Drive: 9 plays, 38 yards, 2:26; Maryland 24–7)

Third quarter

- (11:05) MD – Glendon Miller 44 yard interception return, Jack Howes kick (Drive: 4 plays, 10 yards, 1:28; Maryland 31–7)

Fourth quarter

- (6:53) AUB – Jeremiah Cobb 1 yard run, two-point pass conversion failed (Drive: 3 plays, 66 yards, 0:58; Maryland 31–13)

Statistics	AUB	UMD
First downs	20	15
Plays–yards	77–300	59–310
Rushes–yards	35–76	32–102
Passing yards	224	208
Passing: comp–att–int	21–42–2	10–26–1
Turnovers		
Time of possession	31:52	28:08

Team	Category	Player	Statistics
Auburn	Passing	Hank Brown	7/9, 132 YDS
Auburn	Rushing	Jarquez Hunter	13 Car, 44 YDS
Auburn	Receiving	Caleb Burton III	5 Rec, 78 YDS
Maryland	Passing	Billy Edwards Jr.	6/20, 126 YDS, 1 TD
Maryland	Rushing	Billy Edwards Jr.	13 Car, 50 YDS, 1 TD
Maryland	Receiving	Roman Hemby	1 Rec, 61 YDS

== Personnel ==
=== Roster ===
2023 Maryland Terrapins football team roster
Players
Coaches
Offense

Pos.	#	Name	Class
WR	0	Tyrese Chambers	GS
WR	1	Kaden Prather	Jr
TE	2	Corey Dyches	RJr
QB	3	Taulia Tagovailoa	RSr
WR	4	Shaleak Knotts	So
WR	5	Octavian Smith Jr.	So
WR	6	Jeshaun Jones	GS
RB	7	Antwain Littleton II	RSo
RB	8	Ramon Brown	So
QB	9	Billy Edwards Jr.	RSo
WR	10	Tai Felton	Jr
WR	11	Ryan Manning	Fr
QB	12	Cameron Edge	RFr
QB	13	Jayden Sauray	RFr
QB	14	Champ Long	Fr
WR	16	Leon Haughton Jr.	So
TE	17	Rico Walker	Fr
TE	18	Dylan Wade	Fr
WR	19	Braeden Wisloski	Fr
WR	21	Sean Williams	Fr
WR	22	Ezekiel Avit	Fr
RB	23	Colby McDonald	Jr
RB	24	Roman Hemby	RSo
RB	25	Nolan Ray	Fr
WR	26	Ricardo Cooper Jr.	Fr
RB	27	Eli Mason	So
WR	29	Taylor Best	Fr
WR	36	Alec Hughes	Fr
WR	37	Parker Jones	Fr
WR	38	Jaden Fair	Fr
TE	47	Maxwell Brown	RSo
TE	48	Thomas McCluskey	Fr
WR	50	David DeGuzman	So
OL	51	Corey Bullock	RSr
OL	52	Mike Purcell	GS
OL	54	DeAndre Duffus	Fr
OL	55	Andre Roye Jr.	RFr
OL	56	Tamarus Walker	Fr
OL	57	Ja'Kavion Nonar	RFr
OL	58	Marcus Dumervil	RJr
OL	60	Khristopher Love	RJr
OL	63	Billy Molloy	Fr
OL	66	Aric Harris	RSr
OL	70	Amelio Morán	RSr
OL	72	Gottlieb Ayedze	RSr
OL	74	Delmar Glaze	RJr
OL	75	Conor Fagan	RJr
OL	76	Kyle Long	RSo
OL	77	Kevin Kalonji	RJr
WR	80	Michael Clubb	Fr
TE	82	Leron Husbands	RSo
TE	83	Joshua Jennings	So
TE	85	Preston Howard	RFr
WR	86	Josh Richards	Fr
WR	87	Robert Smith	RSo
WR	88	Khalid Jones	RSo
TE	89	AJ Szymanski	Fr

Defense

Pos.	#	Name	Class
LB	0	Neeo Avery	Fr
LB	1	Jaishawn Barham	So
DB	2	Beau Brade	Sr
DB	3	Ja'Quan Sheppard	RSr
DB	4	Tarheeb Still	Sr
DL	5	Quashon Fuller	RJr
DB	6	Corey Coley Jr.	Jr
DL	8	Jordan Phillips	RFr
LB	9	Fa'Najae Gotay	RSr
LB	11	Ruben Hyppolite II	Sr
DB	12	Dante Trader Jr.	Jr
DB	13	Glendon Miller	RJr
DB	14	Tamarcus Cooley	Fr
LB	15	Riyad Wilmot	RJr
LB	16	Daniel Wingate	Fr
DB	17	Lionell Whitaker	So
DB	18	Alex Moore	Fr
DL	19	Donnell Brown	RJr
DB	20	Perry Fisher	RFr
LB	21	Gereme Spraggins	RSr
LB	22	Sean Greeley	RSr
DB	23	Avantae Williams	RJr
DB	24	Chantz Harley	RSo
DB	25	Kevis Thomas	Fr
DB	26	Gavin Gibson	So
DB	27	Caleb Atogho	So
LB	29	Ian Maloney	RSo
DB	30	J'Mar Branion	Fr
LB	31	Michael Harris	Fr
DB	32	Mykel Morman	Fr
DB	33	Tayvon Nelson	Fr
DB	34	Lavain Scruggs	RFr
LB	35	Kobi Thomas	RSr
DB	36	Karon Ball	Jr
DB	37	Carson Petitbon	Fr
DB	38	Dior Boyd	RSo
DL	39	Daniel Owens	RFr
DL	40	Taizse Johnson	Jr
DB	41	Rex Fleming	Sr
LB	42	DJ Samuels	Fr
DB	43	Jonathan Akins	Fr
LB	44	Caleb Wheatland	So
LB	45	Kellan Wyatt	So
DL	46	Dillan Fontus	Fr
DB	47	Sebastian Antoine-Pompey	Fr
LB	48	Darius Grimes	Fr
LB	51	Dylan Gooden	Fr
DL	55	Lavon Johnson	Fr
LB	57	Isaac Bunyun	RJr
DL	91	Christian Teague	RSr
DL	93	Tre Colbert	GS
DL	99	Tommy Akingbesote	Jr

Special teams

Pos.	#	Name	Class
P	43	Brenden Segovia	RSo
LS	45	Jake Foggia	RJr
LS	49	Mason Foundas	Fr
LS	53	John Stretch II	Jr
LS	59	Ethan Gough	RSo
K, P	91	Jack Howes	RSo
K	98	Evan Johnson	RSr
P	99	Colton Spangler	RSr

Head coach

- Mike Locksley

Coordinators/assistant coaches

- Brian Williams (Defensive Coordinator/Defensive Line)
- Josh Gattis (Offensive Coordinator)
- Kevin Sumlin (Associate Head Coach/Co-Offensive Coordinator/Tight Ends)
- Gunter Brewer (Wide Receivers/Passing Game Coordinator)
- Lance Thompson (Inside Linebackers)
- Henry Baker (Cornerbacks)
- Brian Braswell (Offensive Line)
- James Thomas Jr. (Special Teams Coordinator/Outside Linebackers)
- Zac Spavital (Safeties)
- Latrell Scott (Running Backs)

Legend

- (C) Team captain
- (S) Suspended
- (I) Ineligible
- Injured
- Redshirt

Roster
Last update: 2023-07-18

=== Coaching staff changes ===
Offensive coordinator Dan Enos departed to become the offensive coordinator for Arkansas.

Co-offensive coordinator Mike Miller departed to become the offensive coordinator for Charlotte.

In February, Kevin Sumlin was hired to become the associate head coach, co-offensive coordinator, and tight ends coach.

In March, Josh Gattis was hired to become the offensive coordinator/quarterbacks coach.

Also in March, East Carolina tight ends coach Latrell Scott was hired to become the running backs coach.

=== Recruiting class ===
College recruiting (2023)
Name	Hometown	School	Height	Weight	Commit date
Rico Walker; DE	Hickory, NC	Hickory High School	6 ft 4 in (1.93 m)	230 lb (100 kg)	Dec 14, 2022
Rico Walker; DE	Recruit ratings: Rivals: 247Sports: ESPN: (84)				
Neeo Avery; DE	Olney, MD	Our Lady of Good Counsel High School	6 ft 5 in (1.96 m)	235 lb (107 kg)	Dec 21, 2022
Neeo Avery; DE	Recruit ratings: Rivals: 247Sports: ESPN: (82)				
Dylan Gooden; DE	Columbia, MD	Wilde Lake High School	6 ft 5 in (1.96 m)	205 lb (93 kg)	Dec 18, 2022
Dylan Gooden; DE	Recruit ratings: Rivals: 247Sports: ESPN: (82)				
Michael Harris; ILB	Altamonte Springs, FL	Lake Brantley High School	6 ft 1 in (1.85 m)	190 lb (86 kg)	Feb 1, 2023
Michael Harris; ILB	Recruit ratings: Rivals: 247Sports: ESPN: (81)				
Robert Long; QB	Jersey City, NJ	Saint Peter's Prep	6 ft 0 in (1.83 m)	200 lb (91 kg)	Jun 19, 2021
Robert Long; QB	Recruit ratings: Rivals: 247Sports: ESPN: (79)				
Dylan Wade; TE	Orlando, FL	Jones High School	6 ft 3 in (1.91 m)	245 lb (111 kg)	Jun 27, 2022
Dylan Wade; TE	Recruit ratings: Rivals: 247Sports: ESPN: (78)				
Lavon Johnson; DT	Allentown, PA	Cheshire Academy	6 ft 3 in (1.91 m)	320 lb (150 kg)	Aug 11, 2022
Lavon Johnson; DT	Recruit ratings: Rivals: 247Sports: ESPN: (78)				
Jonathan Akins; CB	Madison, FL	Madison County High	5 ft 11 in (1.80 m)	170 lb (77 kg)	Jun 20, 2022
Jonathan Akins; CB	Recruit ratings: Rivals: 247Sports: ESPN: (78)				
D.J. Samuels; DE	Oradell, NJ	Bergen Catholic High	6 ft 1 in (1.85 m)	235 lb (107 kg)	Jul 8, 2022
D.J. Samuels; DE	Recruit ratings: Rivals: 247Sports: ESPN: (77)				
Ryan Manning; WR	Baltimore, MD	St. Frances Academy	5 ft 10 in (1.78 m)	180 lb (82 kg)	Jun 18, 2022
Ryan Manning; WR	Recruit ratings: Rivals: 247Sports: ESPN: (77)				
Braeden Wisloski; RB	Catawissa, PA	Southern Columbia High School	5 ft 11 in (1.80 m)	185 lb (84 kg)	Jun 28, 2022
Braeden Wisloski; RB	Recruit ratings: Rivals: 247Sports: ESPN: (77)				
Mykel Morman; ATH	Upper Marlboro, MD	Dr. Henry A. Wise Jr. High School	6 ft 1 in (1.85 m)	175 lb (79 kg)	Jun 26, 2022
Mykel Morman; ATH	Recruit ratings: Rivals: 247Sports: ESPN: (77)				
Kevis Thomas; CB	Valdosta, GA	Lowndes High School	6 ft 0 in (1.83 m)	180 lb (82 kg)	Jul 31, 2022
Kevis Thomas; CB	Recruit ratings: Rivals: 247Sports: ESPN: (77)				
Sean Williams; WR	Washington, DC	St. John's College High School	6 ft 0 in (1.83 m)	175 lb (79 kg)	Jun 25, 2022
Sean Williams; WR	Recruit ratings: Rivals: 247Sports: ESPN: (77)				
Dillan Fontus; DT	Brooklyn, NY	Canarsie High School	6 ft 4 in (1.93 m)	260 lb (120 kg)	Jul 23, 2022
Dillan Fontus; DT	Recruit ratings: Rivals: 247Sports: ESPN: (77)				
Daniel Wingate; OLB	Laurel, MD	Saint Vincent Pallotti High School	6 ft 3 in (1.91 m)	215 lb (98 kg)	Jul 6, 2022
Daniel Wingate; OLB	Recruit ratings: Rivals: 247Sports: ESPN: (77)				
Nolan Ray; RB	Bloomfield Hills, MI	Brother Rice High School	6 ft 0 in (1.83 m)	200 lb (91 kg)	Jul 9, 2022
Nolan Ray; RB	Recruit ratings: Rivals: 247Sports: ESPN: (77)				
Ezekiel Avit; WR	Potomac, MD	Winston Churchill High School	6 ft 2 in (1.88 m)	180 lb (82 kg)	Oct 1, 2022
Ezekiel Avit; WR	Recruit ratings: Rivals: 247Sports: ESPN: (76)				
Tamarcus Cooley; ATH	Rolesville, NC	Rolesville High School	6 ft 0 in (1.83 m)	195 lb (88 kg)	Dec 21, 2022
Tamarcus Cooley; ATH	Recruit ratings: Rivals: 247Sports: ESPN: (76)				
Josh Richards; WR	East Orange, NJ	East Orange Campus High School	6 ft 3 in (1.91 m)	175 lb (79 kg)	Jun 27, 2022
Josh Richards; WR	Recruit ratings: Rivals: 247Sports: ESPN: (76)				
Tamarus Walker; OG	Owings Mills, MD	McDonogh School	6 ft 3 in (1.91 m)	320 lb (150 kg)	Jun 12, 2022
Tamarus Walker; OG	Recruit ratings: Rivals: 247Sports: ESPN: (76)				
Deandre Duffus; OG	Hollywood, FL	Chaminade-Madonna College Preparatory School	6 ft 4 in (1.93 m)	315 lb (143 kg)	Jul 3, 2022
Deandre Duffus; OG	Recruit ratings: Rivals: 247Sports: ESPN: (76)				
Tayvon Nelson; CB	Brooklyn, NY	Canarsie High School	6 ft 2 in (1.88 m)	190 lb (86 kg)	Jul 23, 2022
Tayvon Nelson; CB	Recruit ratings: Rivals: 247Sports: ESPN: (76)				
A.J. Szymanski; TE	Baltimore, MD	Loyola Blakefield High School	6 ft 4 in (1.93 m)	245 lb (111 kg)	Jun 26, 2022
A.J. Szymanski; TE	Recruit ratings: Rivals: 247Sports: ESPN: (74)				
Alex Moore; ATH	Laurel, MD	Saint Vincent Pallotti High School	6 ft 1 in (1.85 m)	180 lb (82 kg)	Jul 1, 2022
Alex Moore; ATH	Recruit ratings: Rivals: 247Sports: ESPN: (74)				
Kevin Kalonji; OT	Silver Spring, MD	Coffeyville Community College	6 ft 6 in (1.98 m)	330 lb (150 kg)	Jun 4, 2023
Kevin Kalonji; OT	Recruit ratings: Rivals: 247Sports: ESPN: (0)				
Overall recruit ranking: Rivals: #48 247Sports: #36
Note: In many cases, Scout, Rivals, 247Sports, On3, and ESPN may conflict in their listings of height and weight.; In these cases, the average was taken. ESPN grades are on a 100-point scale.; Sources: "Rivals commits". Rivals.; "ESPN commits". ESPN.; "2023 Team Ranking". Rivals.com.; "247Sports commits". 247Sports.

=== Outgoing transfers ===
21 players elected to enter the NCAA transfer portal during or after the 2022 season.

Name	Pos.	New school
Tyler Baylor	DL	Kent State
Ahmad McCullough	LB	Washington State
Austin Fontaine	DL	Charlotte
CJ Dippre	TE	Alabama
Ja'Khi Green	OL	Charlotte
Jayon Venerable	DB	Hutchinson Community College
Weston Wolff	TE	South Florida
Zion Shockley	DL	Charlotte
Terrance Butler Jr.	LB	Charlotte
Kameron Blount	LB	Bowie State
Isaiah Hazel	DB	Charlotte
Challen Faamatau	RB	Charlotte
Shane Mosley	DB	West Chester
Mosiah Nasili-Kite	DL	Auburn
Mason Lunsford	OL	LSU
Anthony Booker Jr.	DL	Arkansas
Keon Kindred	OL	Akron
Andrew Booker	LB	Bowling Green
Coltin Deery	OL	TCU
Anthony Pecorella	P	Stony Brook
Joseph Bearns	FB	Charlotte

=== Incoming transfers ===
The Terrapins added 11 players from the NCAA transfer portal.

Name	Pos.	Previous school
Tyrese Chambers	WR	FIU
Ja'Quan Sheppard	DB	Cincinnati
Avantae Williams	DB	Miami
Marcus Dumervil	OL	LSU
Donnell Brown	DL	Saint Francis
Jordan Phillips	DL	Tennessee
Kaden Prather	WR	West Virginia
Corey Bullock	OL	North Carolina Central
Gottlieb Ayedze	OL	Frostburg State
Tre’Darius Colbert	DL	Angelo State
Michael Purcell	OL	Duke

=== 2023 NFL draft ===
14 players declared for the 2023 NFL draft.

Maryland players leaving for the NFL Draft
Name	Number	Pos.	Height	Weight	Year	Hometown	Combine	Team	Round	Pick
Jacob Copeland	2	WR	6'-0"	202	Junior	Pensacola, FL	Yes	Tennessee Titans	None	UDFA
Dontay Demus Jr.	7	WR	6'-4"	215	Senior	Washington, DC	Yes	Baltimore Ravens	None	UDFA
Deonte Banks	3	DB	6'-2"	205	Junior	Baltimore, MD	Yes	New York Giants	1	25
Rakim Jarrett	1	WR	6'-0"	190	Junior	Palmer Park, MD	Yes	Tampa Bay Buccaneers	None	UDFA
Durell Nchami	30	LB	6'-4"	260	Senior	Silver Spring, MD	No	Denver Broncos	None	UDFA
Ami Finau	54	DL	6'-2"	320	Senior	Kahuku, HI	No	New York Giants	None	UDFA
Jakorian Bennett	2	DB	5'-11"	195	Senior	Mobile, AL	Yes	Las Vegas Raiders	4	104
Chad Ryland	34	PK	6'-0"	183	Senior	Lebanon, PA	Yes	New England Patriots	4	112
Johari Branch	50	IOL	6'-3"	330	Senior	Chicago, IL	No	Los Angeles Chargers	None	UDFA
Spencer Anderson	54	OL	6'-5"	320	Senior	Bowie, MD	No	Pittsburgh Steelers	7	251
Jaelyn Duncan	71	OL	6'-6"	320	Senior	New Carrollton, MD	Yes	Tennessee Titans	6	186
Vandarius Cowan	8	LB	6'-4"	253	Senior	Palm Beach Gardens, FL	No	None	None	UDFA
Greg China-Rose	0	DE	6'-2"	295	Senior	Los Angeles, CA	No	None	None	UDFA
Henry Chibueze	92	DT	6'-3"	310	Senior	Woodbridge, VA	No	Washington Commanders	None	UDFA

== Rankings ==
Ranking movements Legend: ██ Increase in ranking ██ Decrease in ranking — = Not ranked RV = Received votes
	Week															
Poll	Pre	1	2	3	4	5	6	7	8	9	10	11	12	13	14	Final
AP	—	—	RV	RV	RV	RV	RV	—	—	—	—	—	—	—	—	
Coaches	RV	RV	RV	RV	RV	RV	RV	RV	RV	—	—	—	—	—	—	
CFP	Not released									—	—	—	—	—	—	Not released

== Statistics ==
=== Team ===
	Maryland	Opp
Points per game		
Total		
First downs		
Rushing		
Passing		
Penalty		
Rushing yards		
Avg per play		
Avg per game		
Rushing touchdowns		
Passing yards		
Att-Comp-Int		
Avg per pass		
Avg per catch		
Avg per game		
Passing touchdowns		
Total offense		
Avg per play		
Avg per game		
Fumbles-Lost		
Penalties-Yards		
Avg per game		
Punts-Yards		
Avg per punt		
Time of possession/Game		
3rd down conversions		
4th down conversions		
Touchdowns scored		
Field goals-Attempts		
PAT-Attempts		
Attendance		
Games/Avg per Game		
Neutral Site		

=== Individual Leaders ===
==== Offense ====
Passing statistics
#	NAME	POS	RAT	CMP	ATT	YDS	AVG/G	CMP%	TD	INT	LONG
3	Taulia Tagovailoa	QB	–	–	–	–	–	–	–	–	–
12	Cameron Edge	QB	–	–	–	–	–	–	–	–	–
9	Billy Edwards Jr.	QB	–	–	–	–	–	–	–	–	–
		QB	–	–	–	–	–	–	–	–	–
	TOTALS		–	–	–	–	–	–	–	–	–

Rushing statistics
#	NAME	POS	ATT	GAIN	AVG	TD	LONG	AVG/G
24	Roman Hemby	RB	–	–	–	–	–	–
23	Colby McDonald	RB	–	–	–	–	–	–
7	Antwain Littleton III	RB	–	–	–	–	–	–
25	Nolan Ray	RB	–	–	–	–	–	–
27	Eli Mason	RB	–	–	–	–	–	–
		RB	–	–	–	–	–	–
	TOTALS		–	–	–	–	–	–

Receiving statistics
#	NAME	POS	CTH	YDS	AVG	TD	LONG	AVG/G
6	Jeshaun Jones	WR	–	–	–	–	–	–
10	Tai Felton	WR	–	–	–	–	–	–
1	Kaden Prather	WR	–	–	–	–	–	–
5	Octavian Smith Jr.	WR	–	–	–	–	–	–
0	Tyrese Chambers	WR	–	–	–	–	–	–
4	Shaleak Knotts	WR	–	–	–	–	–	–
11	Ryan Manning	WR	–	–	–	–	–	–
87	Robert Smith Jr.	WR	–	–	–	–	–	–
		WR	–	–	–	–	–	–
2	Corey Dyches	TE	–	–	–	–	–	–
85	Preston Howard	TE	–	–	–	–	–	–
17	Rico Walker	TE	–	–	–	–	–	–
18	Dylan Wade	TE	–	–	–	–	–	–
		TE	–	–	–	–	–	–
	TOTALS		–	–	–	–	–	–

==== Defense ====
Defense statistics
#	NAME	POS	SOLO	AST	TOT	TFL-YDS	SACK-YDS	INT-YDS	BU	QBH	FR	FF	BLK	SAF	TD
		DL	–	–	–	–	–	–	–	–	–	–	–	–	–
		DL	–	–	–	–	–	–	–	–	–	–	–	–	–
		DL	–	–	–	–	–	–	–	–	–	–	–	–	–
		DL	–	–	–	–	–	–	–	–	–	–	–	–	–
		DL	–	–	–	–	–	–	–	–	–	–	–	–	–
		DL	–	–	–	–	–	–	–	–	–	–	–	–	–
		DL	–	–	–	–	–	–	–	–	–	–	–	–	–
		DL	–	–	–	–	–	–	–	–	–	–	–	–	–
		DL	–	–	–	–	–	–	–	–	–	–	–	–	–
		DL	–	–	–	–	–	–	–	–	–	–	–	–	–
		DL	–	–	–	–	–	–	–	–	–	–	–	–	–
		DL	–	–	–	–	–	–	–	–	–	–	–	–	–
		DL	–	–	–	–	–	–	–	–	–	–	–	–	–
		DL	–	–	–	–	–	–	–	–	–	–	–	–	–
		DL	–	–	–	–	–	–	–	–	–	–	–	–	–
		DL	–	–	–	–	–	–	–	–	–	–	–	–	–
		RUSH	–	–	–	–	–	–	–	–	–	–	–	–	–
		RUSH	–	–	–	–	–	–	–	–	–	–	–	–	–
		RUSH	–	–	–	–	–	–	–	–	–	–	–	–	–
		RUSH	–	–	–	–	–	–	–	–	–	–	–	–	–
		RUSH	–	–	–	–	–	–	–	–	–	–	–	–	–
		LB	–	–	–	–	–	–	–	–	–	–	–	–	–
		LB	–	–	–	–	–	–	–	–	–	–	–	–	–
		LB	–	–	–	–	–	–	–	–	–	–	–	–	–
		LB	–	–	–	–	–	–	–	–	–	–	–	–	–
		LB	–	–	–	–	–	–	–	–	–	–	–	–	–
		LB	–	–	–	–	–	–	–	–	–	–	–	–	–
		LB	–	–	–	–	–	–	–	–	–	–	–	–	–
		DB	–	–	–	–	–	–	–	–	–	–	–	–	–
		DB	–	–	–	–	–	–	–	–	–	–	–	–	–
		DB	–	–	–	–	–	–	–	–	–	–	–	–	–
		DB	–	–	–	–	–	–	–	–	–	–	–	–	–
		DB	–	–	–	–	–	–	–	–	–	–	–	–	–
		DB	–	–	–	–	–	–	–	–	–	–	–	–	–
		DB	–	–	–	–	–	–	–	–	–	–	–	–	–
		DB	–	–	–	–	–	–	–	–	–	–	–	–	–
		DB	–	–	–	–	–	–	–	–	–	–	–	–	–
		DB	–	–	–	–	–	–	–	–	–	–	–	–	–
		DB	–	–	–	–	–	–	–	–	–	–	–	–	–
		DB	–	–	–	–	–	–	–	–	–	–	–	–	–
		DB	–	–	–	–	–	–	–	–	–	–	–	–	–
		DB	–	–	–	–	–	–	–	–	–	–	–	–	–
		DB	–	–	–	–	–	–	–	–	–	–	–	–	–
		DB	–	–	–	–	–	–	–	–	–	–	–	–	–
–		DB	–	–	–	–	–	–	–	–	–	–	–	–	–
	Team		–	–	–	–	–	–	–	–	–	–	–	–	–
	TOTAL		–	–	–	–	–	–	–	–	–	–	–	–	–

Key: POS: Position, SOLO: Solo Tackles, AST: Assisted Tackles, TOT: Total Tackles, TFL: Tackles-for-loss, SACK: Quarterback Sacks, INT: Interceptions, BU: Passes Broken Up, PD: Passes Defended, QBH: Quarterback Hits, FR: Fumbles Recovered, FF: Forced Fumbles, BLK: Kicks or Punts Blocked, SAF: Safeties, TD : Touchdown

==== Special teams ====
Kicking statistics
#	NAME	POS	XPM	XPA	XP%	FGM	FGA	FG%	1–19	20–29	30–39	40–49	50+	LNG
		K	–	–	–	–	–	–	0/0	0/0	0/0	0/0	0/0	–
		K	–	–	–	–	–	–	0/0	0/0	0/0	0/0	0/0	–
	TOTALS		–	–	–	–	–	–	0/0	0/0	0/0	0/0	0/0	–

Kickoff statistics
#	NAME	POS	KICKS	YDS	AVG	TB	OB
–	–	–	–	–	–	–	–
	TOTALS		–	–	–	–	–

Punting statistics
#	NAME	POS	PUNTS	YDS	AVG	LONG	TB	I–20	50+	BLK
		P	–	–	–	–	–	–	–	–
		P	–	–	–	–	–	–	–	–
	TOTALS		–	–	–	–	–	–	–	–

Kick return statistics
#	NAME	POS	RTNS	YDS	AVG	TD	LNG
			–	–	–	–	–
	TOTALS		–	–	–	–	–

Punt return statistics
#	NAME	POS	RTNS	YDS	AVG	TD	LONG
			–	–	–	–	–
	TOTALS		–	–	–	–	–

=== Scoring ===
==== Maryland vs. non-conference opponents ====
	1	2	3	4	Total
Maryland	28	23	22	45	118
Opponents	28	3	3	6	40

==== Maryland vs. Big Ten opponents ====
	1	2	3	4	Total
Maryland	80	68	48	48	244
Opponents	57	51	48	76	232

==== Maryland vs. all opponents ====
	1	2	3	4	Total
Maryland	108	91	70	93	362
Opponents	85	54	51	82	272
