= 2024 Maryland Terrapins football team =

American college football season

2024 Maryland Terrapins football
- Conference: Big Ten Conference
- Record: 4–8 (1–8 Big Ten)
- Head coach: Mike Locksley (6th season)
- Offensive coordinator: Josh Gattis (2nd season)
- Co-offensive coordinator: Kevin Sumlin (2nd season)
- Offensive scheme: Pro spread
- Defensive coordinator: Brian Williams (3rd season)
- Co-defensive coordinator: Aazaar Abdul-Rahim (1st season)
- Base defense: 4–3
- Home stadium: SECU Stadium

2024 Big Ten Conference football standings
	Conf.			Overall
Team	W		L	W		L
No. 3 Oregon y$^	9	–	0	13	–	1
No. 10 Indiana ^	8	–	1	11	–	2
No. 5 Penn State y^	8	–	1	13	–	3
No. 1 Ohio State #^	7	–	2	14	–	2
No. 16 Illinois	6	–	3	10	–	3
Iowa	6	–	3	8	–	5
Michigan	5	–	4	8	–	5
Minnesota	5	–	4	8	–	5
USC	4	–	5	7	–	6
Rutgers	4	–	5	7	–	6
Washington	4	–	5	6	–	7
Nebraska	3	–	6	7	–	6
UCLA	3	–	6	5	–	7
Wisconsin	3	–	6	5	–	7
Northwestern	2	–	7	4	–	8
Maryland	1	–	8	4	–	8
Michigan State†	0	–	6	0	–	7
Purdue	0	–	9	1	–	11
Championship: Oregon 45, Penn State 37
# – College Football Playoff champion; ^ – College Football Playoff participant; $ – Conference champion; y – Championship game participant; † — NCAA vacated all wins for Michigan State (5–7, 3–6); Rankings from AP Poll

The 2024 Maryland Terrapins football team represented the University of Maryland, College Park in the Big Ten Conference during the 2024 NCAA Division I FBS football season. The Terrapins were led by Mike Locksley in his sixth year as head coach. They played their home games at SECU Stadium in College Park, Maryland.

== Schedule ==
Date	Time	Opponent	Site	TV	Result	Attendance
August 31	12:00 p.m.	UConn*	SECU Stadium; College Park, MD	FS1	W 50–7	35,421
September 7	3:30 p.m.	Michigan State	SECU Stadium; College Park, MD	BTN	L 24–27	34,819
September 14	8:00 p.m.	at Virginia*	Scott Stadium; Charlottesville, VA (rivalry)	ACCN	W 27–13	41,352
September 21	12:00 p.m.	No. 5 (FCS) Villanova*	SECU Stadium; College Park, MD	BTN	W 38–20	38,006
September 28	12:00 p.m.	at Indiana	Memorial Stadium; Bloomington, IN	BTN	L 28–42	48,323
October 11	8:00 p.m.	Northwestern	SECU Stadium; College Park, MD	FS1	L 10–37	39,371
October 19	4:00 p.m.	USC^{†}	SECU Stadium; College Park, MD	FS1	W 29–28	43,013
October 26	3:30 p.m.	at Minnesota	Huntington Bank Stadium; Minneapolis, MN	FS1	L 23–48	48,696
November 9	7:00 p.m.	at No. 1 Oregon	Autzen Stadium; Eugene, OR	BTN	L 18–39	59,245
November 16	6:00 p.m.	Rutgers	SECU Stadium; College Park, MD	FS1	L 17–31	31,433
November 23	12:00 p.m.	Iowa	SECU Stadium; College Park, MD	BTN	L 13–29	30,214
November 30	3:30 p.m.	at No. 4 Penn State	Beaver Stadium; University Park, PA (rivalry)	BTN	L 7–44	104,044
*Non-conference game; ^{†}Homecoming; Rankings from AP Poll (and CFP Rankings, from the date when issued) - Released prior to game; All times are in Eastern time

== Game summaries ==
=== vs UConn ===
UConn Huskies (0–0) vs Maryland Terrapins (0–0) – Game summary

Quarter	1	2	3	4	Total
Huskies	0	0	7	0	7
Terrapins	14	9	13	14	50

at SECU Stadium • College Park, Maryland

- Date: August 31
- Game time: 12:03 p.m. EDT
- Game weather: Sunny, 79 °F (26 °C)
- Game attendance: 35,421
- Referee: Art Brown
- TV announcers (FS1): Connor Onion (play-by-play) and Mark Helfrich (color analyst)

Game information
First quarter
- UMD – Felton, Tai 18 yd pass from Edwards Jr., Billy (Howes, Jack kick), 11:32. Terrapins 7–0. Drive: 8 plays, 75 yards, TOP 03:28
- UMD – Ray, Nolan 48 yd run (Howes, Jack kick), 6:51. Terrapins 14–0. Drive: 7 plays, 92 yards, TOP 03:14

Second quarter

- UMD – Howes, Jack 29 yd field goal, 6:29. Terrapins 17–0. Drive: 7 plays, 28 yards, TOP 02:39
- UMD – Howes, Jack 33 yd field goal, 0:43. Terrapins 20–0. Drive: 12 plays, 61 yards, TOP 03:47
- UMD – Howes, Jack 23 yd field goal, 0:03. Terrapins 23–0. Drive: 6 plays, 40 yards, TOP 00:33

Third quarter

- UMD – Hemby, Roman 4 yd run (Howes, Jack kick), 11:11. Terrapins 30–0. Drive: 7 plays, 78 yards, TOP 02:47
- UCONN – Sheffield, TJ 27 yd pass from Fagnano, Joe (Freeman, Chris kick), 0:16. Terrapins 30–7. Drive: 6 plays, 82 yards, TOP 02:23
- UMD – Felton, Tai 75 yd pass from Edwards Jr., Billy (Kick no good), 0:02. Terrapins 36–7. Drive: 1 plays, 75 yards, TOP 00:14

Fourth quarter

- UMD – McLaurin, Josiah 24 yd pass from Edge, Cameron (Marshall, Gavin kick), 9:26. Terrapins 43–7. Drive: 9 plays, 80 yards, TOP 04:17
- UMD – Williams, DeJuan 9 yd run (Howes, Jack kick), 1:17. Terrapins 50–7. Drive: 5 plays, 19 yards, TOP 01:27

Statistics	CONN	MD
First downs	11	29
Total yards	63–310	83–629
Rushing yards	30–88	46–248
Passing yards	222	381
Passing:	14–33–2	27–37–0
Time of possession	25:39	34:21

Team	Category	Player	Statistics
UConn	Passing	Joe Fagnano	8/16, 149 yards, TD, INT
UConn	Rushing	Durell Robinson	7 carries, 34 yards
UConn	Receiving	Skyler Bell	5 receptions, 141 yards
Maryland	Passing	Billy Edwards Jr.	20/27, 311 yards, 2 TD
Maryland	Rushing	Roman Hemby	14 carries, 66 yards, TD
Maryland	Receiving	Tai Felton	7 receptions, 178 yards, 2 TD

=== vs Michigan State ===
Michigan State Spartans (1–0) vs Maryland Terrapins (1–0) – Game summary

Quarter	1	2	3	4	Total
Spartans	7	10	0	10	27
Terrapins	14	0	3	7	24

at SECU Stadium • College Park, Maryland

- Date: September 7
- Game time: 3:30 p.m. EDT
- Game weather: 72 °F (22 °C), Wind: 8 mph NW, Cloudy
- Game attendance: 34,819
- Referee: Jerry McGinn
- TV announcers (BTN): Jason Ross Jr. (play-by-play), Anthony Herron (analyst), and Kylen Mills (sideline)

Game information

First quarter

- (08:30) UMD TD: Tai Felton 15-yard pass from Billy Edwards Jr. (Jack Howes kick) UMD 7–0; 14 plays, 75 yards, 6:30
- (05:17) MSU TD: Montorie Foster Jr. 9-yard pass from Aidan Chiles (Jonathan Kim kick) Tied 7–7; 8 plays, 84 yards, 3:07
- (00:47) UMD TD: Billy Edwards Jr. 7-yard run (Jack Howes kick) UMD 14–7; 2 plays, 17 yards, 00:47

Second quarter

- (10:07) MSU TD: Jaron Glover 34-yard pass from Aidan Chiles (Jonathan Kim kick) Tied 14–14; 11 plays, 75 yards, 5:40
- (00:00) MSU FG: Jonathan Kim 50-yard field goal MSU 17–14; 11 plays, 75 yards, 5:40

Third quarter

- (08:18) UMD FG: Jack Howes 28-yard field goal Tied 17–17; 7 plays, 53 yards, 2:44

Fourth quarter

- (14:54) UMD TD: Dylan Wade 28-yard pass from Billy Edwards Jr. (Jack Howes kick) UMD 24–17; 10 plays, 80 yards, 4:18
- (04:11) MSU TD: Nick Marsh 77-yard pass from Aidan Chiles (Jonathan Kim kick) Tied 24–24; 1 plays, 77 yards, 00:11
- (00:01) MSU FG: Jonathan Kim 37-yard field goal MSU 27–24; 13 plays, 65 yards, 2:11

Statistics	MSU	MD
First downs	26	21
Total yards	67–493	65–339
Rushing yards	30–129	31–86
Passing yards	357	264
Passing:	24–39–3	26–34–1
Time of possession	27:31	32:29

Team	Category	Player	Statistics
Michigan State	Passing	Aidan Chiles	24/39, 363 yards, 3 TD, 3 INT
Michigan State	Rushing	Nate Carter	11 carries, 59 yards
Michigan State	Receiving	Nick Marsh	8 receptions, 194 yards, 1 TD
Maryland	Passing	Billy Edwards Jr.	26/34, 253 yards, 2 TD, 1 INT
Maryland	Rushing	Roman Hemby	12 carries, 35 yards
Maryland	Receiving	Tai Felton	11 receptions, 152 yards, 1 TD

=== at Virginia (rivalry) ===
Maryland Terrapins (1–1) at Virginia Cavaliers (2–0) – Game summary

Quarter	1	2	3	4	Total
Terrapins	0	7	10	10	27
Cavaliers	3	10	0	0	13

at Scott Stadium • Charlottesville, Virginia

- Date: September 14
- Game time: 8:00 p.m. EDT
- Game weather: Sunny • Temperature: 74 °F (23 °C) • Wind: NE 5 mph
- Game attendance: 41,352
- Referee: Larry Smith
- TV announcers (ACCN): Wes Durham (play-by-play), Tom Luginbill (analyst), and Dana Boyle (sideline)

Game information

First quarter

- (0:50) UVA – Will Bettridge 19-yard field goal (Drive: 5 plays, 64 yards, 1:09; Virginia 3–0)

Second quarter

- (8:27) UVA – Will Bettridge 29-yard field goal (Drive: 13 plays, 77 yards, 5:07; Virginia 6–0)
- (0:54) UMD – Tai Felton 19-yard pass from Billy Edwards Jr., Jack Howes kick (Drive: 7 plays, 47 yards, 1:23; Maryland 7–6)
- (0:01) UVA – Anthony Colandrea 10-yard run, Will Bettridge kick (Drive: 5 plays, 71 yards, 0:49; Virginia 13–7)

Third quarter

- (10:55) UMD – Kaden Prather 26-yard pass from Billy Edwards Jr., Jack Howes kick (Drive: 8 plays, 68 yards, 3:34; Maryland 14–13)
- (2:49) UMD – Jack Howes 37-yard field goal (Drive: 8 plays, 45 yards, 3:14; Maryland 17–13)

Fourth quarter

- (12:31) UMD – Jack Howes 33-yard field goal (Drive: 11 plays, 43 yards, 3:47; Maryland 20–13)
- (7:10) UMD – Billy Edwards Jr. 1-yard run, Jack Howes kick (Drive: 8 plays, 52 yards, 4:09; Maryland 27–13)

Statistics	MD	UVA
First downs	21	18
Total yards	80–391	67–370
Rushing yards	37–128	30–123
Passing yards	263	247
Passing:	28–43–0	21–37–2
Time of possession	35:36	24:24

Team	Category	Player	Statistics
Maryland	Passing	Billy Edwards Jr.	28/43, 263 yards, 2 TD
Maryland	Rushing	Nolan Ray	10 carries, 53 yards
Maryland	Receiving	Tai Felton	9 receptions, 117 yards, TD
Virginia	Passing	Anthony Colandrea	21/37, 247 yards, 2 INT
Virginia	Rushing	Kobe Pace	11 carries, 46 yards
Virginia	Receiving	Trell Harris	4 receptions, 72 yards

=== vs No. 5 (FCS) Villanova ===
No. 5 (FCS) Villanova Wildcats (3–0) vs Maryland Terrapins (2–1) – Game summary

Quarter	1	2	3	4	Total
No. 5 (FCS) Wildcats	0	0	10	10	20
Terrapins	17	7	7	7	38

at SECU Stadium • College Park, Maryland

- Date: September 21
- Game time: 12:00 p.m. EDT
- Game weather: Clear • Temperature: 77 °F (25 °C) • Wind: S 6 mph
- Game attendance: 38,006
- Referee: Greg Sujack
- TV announcers (BTN): Mark Followill (play-by-play), Anthony Herron (analyst), and Dannie Rogers (sideline)

Game information

First quarter

- (9:38) UMD – Kaden Prather 18-yard pass from Billy Edwards Jr., Jack Howes kick (Drive: 11 plays, 75 yards, 5:22; Maryland 7–0)
- (5:52) UMD – Roman Hemby 6-yard run, Jack Howes kick (Drive: 7 plays, 57 yards, 2:44; Maryland 14–0)
- (1:29) UMD – Jack Howes 46-yard field goal (Drive: 8 plays, 29 yards, 3:14; Maryland 17–0)

Second quarter

- (2:39) UMD – Nolan Ray 1-yard run, Jack Howes kick (Drive: 13 plays, 80 yards, 6:49; Maryland 24–0)

Third quarter

- (7:17) VIL – Ethan Gettman 33-yard field goal (Drive: 4 plays, -8 yards, 1:20; Maryland 24–3)
- (4:15) VIL – Devin Smith 17-yard pass from Connor Watkins, Ethan Gettman kick (Drive: 6 plays, 53 yards, 3:00; Maryland 24–10)
- (0:36) UMD – Tai Felton 9-yard pass from Billy Edwards Jr., Jack Howes kick (Drive: 8 plays, 75 yards, 3:39; Maryland 31–10)

Fourth quarter

- (10:33) VIL – Ethan Gettman 37-yard field goal (Drive: 11 plays, 55 yards, 5:03; Maryland 31–13)
- (9:06) UMD – MJ Morris 14-yard run, Jack Howes kick (Drive: 4 plays, 75 yards, 1:27; Maryland 38–13)
- (1:11) VIL – Tanner Maddocks 8-yard run, Ethan Gettman kick (Drive: 9 plays, 80 yards, 4:14; Maryland 38–20)

Statistics	VILL	MD
First downs	20	25
Total yards	65–231	64–497
Rushing yards	32–75	30–159
Passing yards	156	338
Passing:	16–33–0	29–34–1
Time of possession	32:16	27:44

Team	Category	Player	Statistics
Villanova	Passing	Connor Watkins	12/29, 106 yards, TD
Villanova	Rushing	Ja'briel Mace	2 carries, 24 yards
Villanova	Receiving	Devin Smith	5 receptions, 62 yards, TD
Maryland	Passing	Billy Edwards Jr.	28/32, 328 yards, 2 TD, INT
Maryland	Rushing	Roman Hemby	14 carries, 67 yards, TD
Maryland	Receiving	Tai Felton	14 receptions, 157 yards, TD

=== at Indiana ===
Maryland Terrapins (3–1) at Indiana Hoosiers (4–0) – Game summary

Quarter	1	2	3	4	Total
Terrapins	0	7	14	7	28
Hoosiers	0	14	14	14	42

at Memorial Stadium • Bloomington, Indiana

- Date: September 28
- Game time: 12:00 p.m. EDT
- Game weather: Rain • Temperature: 65 °F (18 °C) • Wind: NE 11 mph
- Game attendance: 48,323
- Referee: Chris Coyte
- TV announcers (BTN): Jeff Levering (play-by-play), Jake Butt (analyst), and Brooke Fletcher (sideline)

Game information

First quarter

No scoring plays

Second quarter

- (14:55) IND – Myles Price 1-yard run, Nicolas Radicic kick (Drive: 12 plays, 83 yards, 5:26; Indiana 7–0)
- (9:16) MAR – Kaden Prather 33-yard pass from Billy Edwards Jr., Jack Howes kick (Drive: 11 plays, 81 yards, 5:34; Tied 7–7)
- (0:38) IND – Omar Cooper Jr., 27-yard pass from Kurtis Rourke, Nicolas Radicic kick (Drive: 3 plays, 63 yards, 0:32; Indiana 14–7)

Third quarter

- (9:52) MAR – Dylan Wade-yard pass from Billy Edwards Jr., Jack Howes kick (Drive: 10 plays, 75 yards, 5:08; Tied 14–14)
- (7:31) IND – Justice Ellison 19-yard run, Nicolas Radicic kick (Drive: 7 plays, 75 yards, 2:21; Indiana 21–14)
- (7:21) MAR – Roman Hemby 75-yard run, Jack Howes kick (Drive: 1 play, 75 yards, 0:10; Tied 21–21)
- (0:40) IND – Elijah Sarratt 13-yard pass from Kurtis Rourke, Nicolas Radicic kick (Drive: 9 plays, 63 yards, 4:23; Indiana 28–21)

Fourth quarter

- (12:24) IND – Donaven McCulley 12-yard pass from Kurtis Rourke, Nicolas Radicic kick (Drive: 5 plays, 65 yards, 2:26; Indiana 35–21)
- (4:09) IND – Ty Son Lawton 14-yard run, Nicolas Radicic kick (Drive: 2 plays, 27 yards, 0:53; Indiana 42–21)
- (2:55) MAR – Roman Hemby 12-yard pass from Billy Edwards Jr., Jack Howes kick (Drive: 4 plays, 75 yards, 1:14; Indiana 42–21)

Statistics	MD	IU
First downs	19	28
Total yards	71–401	75–510
Rushing yards	30–112	42–151
Passing yards	289	359
Passing:	26–41–0	22–33–2
Time of possession	29:21	30:39

Team	Category	Player	Statistics
Maryland	Passing	Billy Edwards Jr.	26/41, 289 yards, 3 TD
Maryland	Rushing	Roman Hemby	10 carries, 117 yards, TD
Maryland	Receiving	Kaden Prather	5 receptions, 66 yards, TD
Indiana	Passing	Kurtis Rourke	22/33, 359 yards, 3 TD, 2 INT
Indiana	Rushing	Ty Son Lawton	19 carries, 93 yards, TD
Indiana	Receiving	Elijah Sarratt	7 receptions, 128 yards, TD

=== vs Northwestern ===
Northwestern Wildcats (2–3) vs Maryland Terrapins (3–2) – Game summary

Quarter	1	2	3	4	Total
Wildcats	7	10	0	20	37
Terrapins	0	7	0	3	10

at SECU Stadium • College Park, Maryland

- Date: October 11
- Game time: 8:00 p.m. EDT
- Game weather: 58 °F (14 °C), clear
- Game attendance: 39,371
- Referee: Chris Coyle
- TV announcers (FS1): Connor Onion (play-by-play) and Mark Helfrich (analyst)
- UMTerps.com box score

Game information

First quarter

- (8:03) NU – Jack Lausch 9-yard run, Luke Akers kick (Drive: 7 plays, 62 yards, 4:31; Northwestern 7-0)

Second quarter

- (12:08) NU – Cam Porter 3-yard run, Luke Akers kick (Drive: 10 plays, 92 yards, 6:08; Northwestern 14-0)
- (10:50) NU – Luke Akers 43-yard field goal (Drive: 4 plays, -3 yards, 1:12; Northwestern 17-0)
- (3:22) MD – Billy Edwards Jr. 1-yard run, Jack Howes kick (Drive: 16 plays, 90 yards, 7:25; Northwestern 17-7)

Third quarter

No scoring plays

Fourth quarter

- (14:57) MD – Jack Howes 31-yard field goal (Drive: 18 plays, 86 yards, 9:28; Northwestern 17-10)
- (13:17) NU – Aidan Hubbard 2-yard fumble return, Luke Akers kick (Drive: 2 plays, -13 yards, 0:10; Northwestern 24-10)
- (8:55) NU – Luke Akers 38-yard field goal (Drive: 5 plays, 60 yards, 2:10; Northwestern 27-10)
- (6:23) NU – Luke Akers 38-yard field goal (Drive: 7 plays, 12 yards, 2:25; Northwestern 30-10)
- (4:30) NU – Jake Arthurs 9-yard run, Luke Akers kick (Drive: 3 plays, 20 yards, 1:35; Northwestern 37-10)

Statistics	NU	MD
First downs	10	25
Total yards	283	355
Rushing yards	80	59
Passing yards	203	296
Passing:	10-18-0	28-52-1
Time of possession	26:15	33:45

Team	Category	Player	Statistics
Northwestern	Passing	Jack Lausch	10/18, 203 yards
Northwestern	Rushing	Caleb Komolafe	7 carries, 29 yards
Northwestern	Receiving	Bryce Kirtz	3 receptions, 123 yards
Maryland	Passing	Billy Edwards Jr.	28/51, 296 yards, INT
Maryland	Rushing	Roman Hemby	14 carries, 42 yards
Maryland	Receiving	Kaden Prather	8 receptions, 81 yards

=== vs USC ===
USC Trojans (3–3) vs Maryland Terrapins (3–3) – Game summary

Quarter	1	2	3	4	Total
Trojans	7	14	0	7	28
Terrapins	0	7	7	15	29

at SECU Stadium • College Park, Maryland

- Date: October 19
- Game time: 4:00 p.m. EDT
- Game weather: Sunny, 72 °F (22 °C)
- Game attendance: 43,013
- Referee: Jeffrey Sevinski
- TV announcers (FS1): Eric Collins (play-by-play) and Robert Smith (analyst)

Game information

First quarter

- (0:00) USC – Kyron Hudson 22-yard pass from Miller Moss (Michael Lantz kick) (Drive: 8 plays, 79 yards, 3:25; USC 7–0)

Second quarter

- (11:07) Maryland – Billy Edwards Jr. 16-yard pass from Octavian Smith Jr. (Jack Howes kick) (Drive: 8 plays, 75 yards, 3:53; Tied 7–7)
- (8:08) USC – Ja'Kobi Lane 15-yard pass from Miller Moss (Michael Lantz kick) (Drive: 7 plays, 75 yards, 2:59; USC 14–7)
- (0:21) USC – Woody Marks 5-yard rush (Michael Lantz kick) (Drive: 4 plays, 41 yards, 0:48; USC 21–7)

Third quarter

- (8:32) Maryland – Tai Felton 18-yard pass from Billy Edwards Jr. (Jack Howes kick) (Drive: 1 play, 18 yards, 0:07; USC 21–14)

Fourth quarter

- (13:31) USC – Duce Robinson 26-yard pass from Miller Moss (Michael Lantz kick) (Drive: 10 plays, 80 yards, 4:20; USC 28–14)
- (10:02) Maryland – Roman Hemby 10-yard rush (Kaden Prather 2-point conversion pass from Billy Edward Jr.) (Drive: 10 plays, 75 yards, 3:29; USC 28–22)
- (0:53) Maryland – Billy Edwards Jr. 3-yard rush (Jack Howes kick) (Drive: 5 plays, 47 yards, 0:48; Maryland 29–28)

Statistics	USC	MD
First downs	25	25
Total yards	74–417	75–429
Rushing yards	24–81	24–56
Passing yards	336	373
Passing:	34–50–1	39–51–1
Time of possession	29:51	30:09

Team	Category	Player	Statistics
USC	Passing	Miller Moss	34/50, 336 yards, 3 TD, INT
USC	Rushing	Woody Marks	17 carries, 82 yards, TD
USC	Receiving	Makai Lemon	8 receptions, 89 yards
Maryland	Passing	Billy Edwards Jr.	39/50, 373 yards, 2 TD, INT
Maryland	Rushing	Nolan Ray	6 carries, 54 yards
Maryland	Receiving	Kaden Prather	9 receptions, 111 yards

=== at Minnesota ===
Maryland Terrapins (4–3) at Minnesota Golden Gophers (4–3) – Game summary

Quarter	1	2	3	4	Total
Terrapins	0	10	0	13	23
Golden Gophers	21	13	7	7	48

at Huntington Bank Stadium • Minneapolis, Minnesota

- Date: October 26
- Game time: 3:30 p.m. EDT
- Game weather: 57 °F (14 °C), sunny
- Game attendance: 48,696
- Referee: Jerry McGinn
- TV announcers (FS1): Connor Onion (play-by-play) and Spencer Tillman (analyst)
- UMTerps.com box score

Game information

First quarter

- (10:45) MINN - Daniel Jackson 10-yard pass from Max Brosmer (Dragan Kesich kick) (Drive: 5 plays, 58 yards, 2:30; Minnesota 7–0)
- (5:04) MINN - Elijah Spencer 7-yard pass from Max Brosmer (Dragan Kesich kick) (Drive: 9 plays, 65 yards, 3:54; Minnesota 14–0)
- (4:31) MINN - Justin Walley 29-yard interception return (Dragan Kesich kick) (Drive: 3 plays, 4 yards, 0:39; Minnesota 21–0)

Second quarter

- (14:55) MINN - Dragan Kesich 40-yard field goal (Drive: 4 plays, 1 yard, 1:08; Minnesota 24–0)
- (6:55) MD - Jack Howes 33-yard field goal (Drive: 10 plays, 56 yards, 4:07; Minnesota 24–3)
- (2:17) MINN - Daniel Jackson 4-yard pass from Max Brosmer (Dragan Kesich kick) (Drive: 8 plays, 75 yards, 4:38; Minnesota 31–3)
- (0:28) MD - Billy Edwards Jr. 3-yard rush (Jack Howes kick) (Drive: 12 plays, 75 yards, 1:49; Minnesota 31–10)
- (0:02) MINN - Dragan Kesich 34-yard field goal (Drive: 6 plays, 49 yards, 0:26; Minnesota 34–10)

Third quarter

- (13:00) MINN - Elijah Spencer 25-yard pass from Max Brosmer (Dragan Kesich kick) (Drive: 5 plays, 75 yards, 1:53; Minnesota 41–10)

Fourth quarter

- (14:49) MINN - Darius Taylor 51-yard rush (Dragan Kesich kick) (Drive: 6 plays, 87 yards, 3:50; Minnesota 48–10)
- (11:51) MD - DJ Samuels 2-yard pass from MJ Morris (2-point conversion failed) (Drive: 6 plays, 75 yards, 2:58; Minnesota 48–16)
- (2:13) MD - Shaleak Knotts 21-yard pass from MJ Morris (Jack Howes kick) (Drive: 7 plays, 88 yards, 3:04; Minnesota 48–23)

Statistics	MD	MINN
First downs	21	26
Total yards	427	443
Rushing yards	104	123
Passing yards	323	320
Passing: Comp–Att–Int	26-43-2	26-34-0
Time of possession	27:36	32:24

Team	Category	Player	Statistics
Maryland	Passing	Billy Edwards Jr.	19/35, 201 yards, 2 INT
Maryland	Rushing	Roman Hemby	8 carries, 31 yards
Maryland	Receiving	Tai Felton	9 receptions, 104 yards
Minnesota	Passing	Max Brosmer	26/33, 320 yards, 4 TD
Minnesota	Rushing	Darius Taylor	15 carries, 81 yards, TD
Minnesota	Receiving	Daniel Jackson	9 receptions, 117 yards, 2 TD

=== at No. 1 Oregon ===
Maryland Terrapins (4–4) at No. 1 Oregon Ducks (9–0) – Game summary

Quarter	1	2	3	4	Total
Terrapins	3	7	0	8	18
No. 1 Ducks	7	14	8	10	39

at Autzen Stadium • Eugene, Oregon

- Date: November 9
- Game time: 7:00 p.m. EST
- Game weather: Cloudy • Temperature: 58 °F (14 °C) • Wind: NW 1 mile per hour (1.6 km/h)
- Game attendance: 59,245
- Referee: Larry Smith
- TV announcers (BTN): Jeff Levering (play-by-play), Jake Butt (analyst), and Brooke Fletcher (sideline)

Game information

First quarter

- (10:17) MAR – Jack Howes 37-yard field goal (Drive: 12 plays, 56 yards, 4:43; Maryland 3–0)
- (2:21) ORE – Jordan James 3-yard run, Atticus Sappington kick (Drive: 14 plays, 92 yards, 5:36; Oregon 7–3)

Second quarter

- (13:10) ORE – Brandon Johnson 62-yard fumble recovery, Atticus Sappington kick (Oregon 14–3)
- (3:17) MAR – Roman Hemby 1-yard run, Jack Howes kick (Drive: 9 plays, 70 yards, 4:25; Oregon 14–10)
- (0:20) ORE – Terrance Ferguson 9-yard pass from Dillon Gabriel, Andrew Boyle kick (Drive: 12 plays, 75 yards, 2:57; Oregon 21–10)

Third quarter

- (7:48) ORE – Gernorris Wilson 3-yard pass from Dillon Gabriel, Josh Conerly Jr. rush (Drive: 8 plays, 85 yards, 3:12; Oregon 29–10)

Fourth quarter

- (11:27) MAR – Octavian Smith Jr. 3-yard pass from Billy Edwards Jr., Billy Edwards Jr. rush (Drive: 10 plays, 59 yards, 4:07; Oregon 29–18)
- (5:47) ORE – Atticus Sappington 20-yard field goal (Drive: 4 plays, 2 yards, 1:59; Oregon 32–18)
- (3:45) ORE – Evan Stewart 17-yard pass from Dillon Gabriel, Andrew Boyle kick (Drive: 5 plays, 32 yards, 1:08; Oregon 39–18)

Statistics	MD	ORE
First downs	19	19
Total yards	76–289	65–363
Rushing yards	31–83	31–180
Passing yards	206	183
Passing:	22–45–2	23–34–0
Time of possession	32:49	27:11

Team	Category	Player	Statistics
Maryland	Passing	Billy Edwards Jr.	22/44, 206 yards, TD, 2 INT
Maryland	Rushing	Roman Hemby	11 carries, 34 yards, TD
Maryland	Receiving	Tai Felton	7 receptions, 72 yards
Oregon	Passing	Dillon Gabriel	23/34, 183 yards, 3 TD
Oregon	Rushing	Noah Whittington	13 carries, 77 yards
Oregon	Receiving	Evan Stewart	6 receptions, 55 yards, TD

=== vs Rutgers ===
Rutgers Scarlet Knights (5–4) vs Maryland Terrapins (4–5) – Game summary

Quarter	1	2	3	4	Total
Scarlet Knights	0	14	7	10	31
Terrapins	3	7	7	0	17

at SECU Stadium • College Park, Maryland

- Date: November 16
- Game time: 6:00 p.m. EST
- Game weather: 54 °F (12 °C), cloudy
- Game attendance: 31,433
- Referee: Brian Banks
- TV announcers (FS1): Chris Myers (play-by-play) and Spencer Tillman (analyst)
- UMTerps.com box score

Game information

First quarter

- MD – Jack Howes 48-yard field goal, 2:06 Maryland 3-0 Drive: 13 plays, 50 yards, 6:34.

Second quarter

- RUT – Ian Strong 12-yard pass from Athan Kaliakmanis (Jai Patel kick), 8:21 Rutgers 7-3 Drive: 17 plays, 75 yards, 8:45.
- MD – Tai Felton 12-yard pass from Billy Edwards Jr. (Jack Howes kick), 4:37 Maryland 10-7 Drive: 8 plays, 75 yards, 3:44.
- RUT – Kyle Monangai 2-yard run (Jai Patel kick), 1:01 Rutgers 14-10 Drive: 9 plays, 75 yards, 3:36.

Third quarter

- MD – Roman Hemby 1-yard run (Jack Howes kick), 11:16 Maryland 17-14 Drive: 8 plays, 75 yards, 3:44.
- RUT – Kyle Monangai 6-yard run (Jai Patel kick), 5:14 Rutgers 21-17 Drive: 11 plays, 75 yards, 6:02.

Fourth quarter

- RUT – Dymere Miller 32-yard pass from Athan Kaliakmanis (Jai Patel kick), 14:55 Rutgers 28-17 Drive: 8 plays, 71 yards, 4:26.
- RUT – Jai Patel 46-yard field goal, 9:53 Rutgers 31-17 Drive: 7 plays, 44 yards, 2:30.

Statistics	RUTG	MD
First downs	24	26
Total yards	370	457
Rushing yards	132	122
Passing yards	238	335
Passing: Comp–Att–Int	20-30-0	32-57-0
Time of possession	32:23	27:37

Team	Category	Player	Statistics
Rutgers	Passing	Athan Kaliakmanis	20/30, 238 yards, 2 TD
Rutgers	Rushing	Kyle Monangai	25 carries, 97 yards, 2 TD
Rutgers	Receiving	Dymere Miller	8 receptions, 107 yards, TD
Maryland	Passing	Billy Edwards Jr.	32/55, 335 yards, TD, INT
Maryland	Rushing	Roman Hemby	16 carries, 87 yards, TD
Maryland	Receiving	Dylan Wade	7 receptions, 92 yards

=== vs Iowa ===
Iowa Hawkeyes (6–4) vs Maryland Terrapins (4–6) – Game summary

Quarter	1	2	3	4	Total
Hawkeyes	3	10	6	10	29
Terrapins	0	0	6	7	13

at SECU Stadium • College Park, Maryland

- Date: November 23
- Game time: 12:00 p.m. EST
- Game weather: 53 °F (12 °C), Sunny, Wind NW 12 mph (19 km/h)
- Game attendance: 30,214
- Referee: Tim O'Dey
- TV announcers (BTN): Guy Haberman (play-by-play), Yogi Roth (analyst), and Rhett Lewis (sideline)
- UMTerps.com box score

Game information

First quarter

- 0:22 Iowa – Drew Stevens 27-yard field goal (Drive: 13 plays, 59 yards, 6:20; Iowa 3–0)

Second quarter

- 6:29 Iowa – Kaleb Johnson 2-yard run (Drew Stevens kick) (Drive: 14 plays, 77 yards, 7:26; Iowa 10–0)
- 1:00 Iowa – Drew Stevens 54-yard field goal (Drive: 6 plays, 8 yards, 0:29; Iowa 13–0)

Third quarter

- 11:05 Iowa – Drew Stevens 50-yard field goal (Drive: 5 plays, 19 yards, 2:26; Iowa 16–0)
- 5:57 Maryland – Tai Felton 8-yard pass from MJ Morris (pass failed) (Drive: 11 plays, 70 yards, 5:08; Iowa 16–6)
- 0:00 Iowa – Drew Stevens 49-yard field goal (Drive: 4 plays, 7 yards, 1:19; Iowa 19–6)

Fourth quarter

- 11:05 Maryland – Tai Felton 12-yard pass from MJ Morris (pass failed) (Drive: 8 plays, 65 yards, 3:54; Iowa 19–13)
- 9:19 Iowa – Kamari Moulton 68-yard run (Drew Stevens kick) (Drive: 4 plays, 80 yards, 1:41; Iowa 26–13)
- 2:10 Iowa – Drew Stevens 26-yard field goal (Drive: 7 plays, 25 yards, 3:04; Iowa 29–13)

Statistics	IOWA	MD
First downs	21	14
Total yards	72–344	57–227
Rushing yards	58–268	26–98
Passing yards	76	129
Passing: comp–att–int	10–14–0	17–31–2
Time of possession	37:41	22:19

Team	Category	Player	Statistics
Iowa	Passing	Jackson Stratton	10/14, 76 yards
Iowa	Rushing	Kaleb Johnson	35 carries, 164 yards, TD
Iowa	Receiving	Jacob Gill	4 receptions, 29 yards
Maryland	Passing	MJ Morris	12/23, 103 yards, 2 TD, 2 INT
Maryland	Rushing	Nolan Ray	4 carries, 48 yards
Maryland	Receiving	Tai Felton	6 receptions, 57 yards, 2 TD

=== at No. 4 Penn State (rivalry) ===
Maryland Terrapins (4–7) at No. 4 Penn State Nittany Lions (10–1) – Game summary

Quarter	1	2	3	4	Total
Terrapins	7	0	0	0	7
No. 4 Nittany Lions	3	28	0	13	44

at Beaver Stadium • University Park, Pennsylvania

- Date: November 30
- Game time: 3:30 p.m. EST
- Game weather: 27 °F (−3 °C), cloudy, snow showers
- Game attendance: 104,044
- Referee: Mark Kluczynski
- TV announcers (BTN): Jeff Levering (play-by-play), Jake Butt (analyst), and Brooke Fletcher (sideline)

Game information
- UM – Kaden Prather, 25-yard TD pass from MJ Morris, Jack Howes kick, 14:46 (UM 7–0)
- PSU – Ryan Barker, 49-yard field goal, 12:47 (UM 7–3)

Second quarter

- PSU – Nicholas Singleton, 2-yard TD run, Barker kick, 12:53 (PSU 10–7)
- PSU – Drew Allar, 1-yard TD run, Barker kick, 10:11 (PSU 17–7)
- PSU – Beau Pribula, 1-yard TD run, Barker kick, 6:53 (PSU 24–7)
- PSU – Tyler Warren, 7-yard TD pass from Allar, Barker kick, 1:46 (PSU 31–7)

Third quarter

No scoring

Fourth quarter

- PSU – Singleton, 18-yard TD run, Barker kick, 14:14 (PSU 38–7)
- PSU – Tyseer Denmark, 15-yard TD pass from Pribula, no attempt, 0:00 (PSU 44–7)

Statistics	MD	PSU
First downs	13	24
Total yards	57–194	79–412
Rushing yards	31–72	49–219
Passing yards	122	193
Passing: comp–att–int	15–26–3	20–30–0
Time of possession	27:20	32:40

Team	Category	Player	Statistics
Maryland	Passing	MJ Morris	14/24, 112 yards, TD, 3 INT
Maryland	Rushing	Roman Hemby	13 carries, 64 yards
Maryland	Receiving	Tai Felton	4 receptions, 27 yards
Penn State	Passing	Drew Allar	17/26, 171 yards, TD
Penn State	Rushing	Nicholas Singleton	13 carries, 87 yards, 2 TD
Penn State	Receiving	Tyler Warren	6 receptions, 68 yards, TD

== Personnel ==
=== Roster ===
2024 Maryland Terrapins football team roster
Players
Coaches
Offense

Pos.	#	Name	Class
TE	0	Dylan Wade	So
WR	1	Kaden Prather	Sr
WR	4	Shaleak Knotts	Jr
WR	5	Octavian Smith Jr.	Jr
QB	7	MJ Morris	So
WR	8	Mekhai White	Fr
QB	9	Billy Edwards Jr.	Jr
WR	10	Tai Felton	Sr
WR	11	Ryan Manning	Fr
QB	12	Cameron Edge	So
QB	13	Jayden Sauray	So
QB	14	Champ Long	Fr
QB	15	Khristian Martin	Fr
TE	16	Leon Haughton Jr.	So
RB	17	Josiah McLaurin	Fr
QB	18	Roman Jensen	Fr
WR	19	Braeden Wisloski	So
RB	20	DeJuan Williams	Fr
WR	21	Sean Williams	Fr
WR	22	Ezekiel Avit	Fr
RB	23	Colby McDonald	Sr
RB	24	Roman Hemby	Jr
RB	25	Nolan Ray	Fr
WR	26	Ricardo Cooper Jr.	Fr
RB	27	Eli Mason	So
RB	29	Colin Reynolds	Fr
WR	36	Alec Hughes	Fr
WR	37	Parker Jones	Fr
WR	38	Jaiden Fair	Fr
RB	39	Ryne Acheson	So
TE	47	Maxwell Brown	Jr
TE	48	Thomas McCluskey	Fr
OL	50	Trevor Szymanski	Fr
OL	54	DeAndre Duffus	Fr
OL	55	Andre Roye Jr.	So
OL	56	Tamarus Walker	Fr
OL	57	Isaac Bunyun	Sr
OL	58	Marcus Dumervil	Sr
OL	61	Michael Hershey	Fr
OL	63	Billy Molloy	Fr
OL	66	Aliou Bah	So
OL	69	Logan Bennett	Fr
OL	70	Josh Kaltenberger	Sr
OL	71	Alan Herron	Jr
OL	72	Terez Davis	Fr
OL	73	Davon Watkins	Fr
OL	74	Isaiah Wright	Jr
OL	75	Ryan Howerton	Fr
OL	76	Kyle Long	Jr
OL	77	Kevin Kalonji	Jr
OL	78	Anthony Robsock	Fr
WR	81	Jahmari Powell-Wonson	Fr
TE	82	Leron Husbands	So
WR	83	Emerson Smith	Fr
TE	85	Preston Howard	So
WR	86	Josh Richards	Fr
WR	87	Robert Smith	Jr
WR	88	Khalid Jones	Jr
TE	89	AJ Szymanski	So

Defense

Pos.	#	Name	Class
LB	0	Neeo Avery	Fr
DB	1	Glendon Miller	Sr
DB	2	Braydon Lee	Fr
LB	4	Ruben Hyppolite II	Sr
DL	5	Quashon Fuller	Sr
DB	6	Brandon Jacob	Fr
DL	7	Tommy Akingbesote	Sr
DL	8	Jordan Phillips	So
LB	10	Trey Reddick	Fr
DB	11	Kevyn Humes	Fr
DB	12	Dante Trader Jr.	Sr
DB	14	Jonathan Akins	Fr
DB	15	Lloyd Irvin III	Fr
LB	16	Daniel Wingate	So
DB	17	Lionell Whitaker	Jr
DB	18	Alex Moore	Fr
LB	19	Donnell Brown	Sr
DB	20	Perry Fisher	So
DB	21	Judah Jenkins	Fr
DB	22	Jalen Huskey	Jr
LB	23	Keyshawn Flowers	Fr
DB	24	Chantz Harley	Jr
DB	25	Kevis Thomas	So
DB	26	Shamar McIntosh	Fr
DB	27	La'khi Roland	Fr
DB	30	J'Mar Branion	Fr
LB	31	Michael Harris	So
DB	32	Mykel Morman	Fr
DB	33	Tayvon Nelson	Fr
DB	34	Lavain Scruggs	So
LB	35	Keyari James	Fr
DB	36	Karon Ball	Jr
DB	37	Carson Petitbon	Fr
DB	38	Taylor Best	Fr
DL	39	Daniel Owens	So
DL	40	Taizse Johnson	Sr
DB	41	Rex Fleming	Sr
LB	42	DJ Samuels	So
LB	44	Caleb Wheatland	Jr
LB	45	Kellan Wyatt	Jr
DL	46	Dillan Fontus	So
DB	47	Sebastian Antoine-Pompey	So
LB	48	Darius Grimes	Fr
DB	49	Chris Wells	Fr
LB	51	Dylan Gooden	Fr
DL	52	Samuel Adu	Sr
DL	53	Akindele Dare	So
LB	55	Keion Flowers	Fr
DL	58	Joshua Simmons	Fr
DL	64	Aaron Folivi	So
DL	90	Lavon Johnson	So
DL	99	Dimitry Nicolas	Fr

Special teams

Pos.	#	Name	Class
P	34	Bryce McFerson	So
P	43	Brenden Segovia	Jr
K	46	Gavin Marshall	So
LS	53	Kellen McConnell	Fr
LS	59	Ethan Gough	Jr
P	84	Philip Noyes	Fr
K, P	91	Jack Howes	Jr
K	98	Ryan Capriotti	Fr

Head coach

- Mike Locksley

Coordinators/assistant coaches

- Kevin Sumlin – Associate head coach/co-offensive coordinator/tight ends
- Brian Williams – Defensive coordinator/defensive linemen
- Josh Gattis – Offensive coordinator/wide receivers
- Aazaar Abdul-Rahim – Co-defensive coordinator/associate head coach/cornerbacks
- Lance Thompson – Inside linebackers
- Brian Braswell – Offensive linemen
- James Thomas Jr. – Special teams coordinator/outside linebackers
- Zac Spavital – Safeties
- Latrell Scott – Running backs
- Damian Wroblewski – Assistant offensive linemen

Legend

- (C) Team captain
- (S) Suspended
- (I) Ineligible
- Injured
- Redshirt

Roster
Last update: 2024-08-09

=== NFL draft ===
Maryland players leaving for the NFL draft
Name	Number	Pos.	Height	Weight	Year	Hometown	Combine	Team	Round	Pick
Tarheeb Still	4	CB	6 ft 1 in	196 lbs	Senior	Sicklerville, New Jersey	Yes	LA Chargers	5	137
Beau Brade	2	S	6 ft 1 in	210 lbs	Senior	Clarksville, Maryland	Yes	Baltimore Ravens		
Ja'Quan Sheppard	3	CB	6 ft 2 in	202 lbs	Senior	Zephyrhills, Florida	No	Las Vegas Raiders		
Delmar Glaze	74	OL	6 ft 5 in	328 lbs	Redshirt Junior	Charlotte, North Carolina	Yes	Las Vegas Raiders	3	77
Gottlieb Ayedze	72	OL	6 ft 5 in	320 lbs	Redshirt Senior	Germantown, Maryland	Yes	Philadelphia Eagles		
Jeshaun Jones	6	WR	6 ft 1 in	188 lbs	Senior	Fort Myers, Florida	No	Minnesota Vikings		
Corey Bullock	51	OL	6 ft 4 in	331 lbs	Senior	Accokeek, Maryland	No			
Taulia Tagovailoa	3	QB	5 ft 11 in	208 lbs	Senior	Ewa Beach, Hawaii	No			
Michael Purcell	52	OL	6 ft 4 in	325 lbs	Graduate Student	Dayton, Ohio	No			
Aric Harris	66	OL	6 ft 3 in	295 lbs	Senior	Pensacola, Florida	No			
Tyrese Chambers	0	WR					No			
Tre Colbert	93	DL	6 ft 3 in	333 lbs	Graduate Student	Temple, Texas	No			
Colton Spangler	99	P	6 ft 0 in	192 lbs	Senior	Pasadena, Maryland	No			
Germene Spraggins	21	LB	6 ft 0 in	238 lbs	Senior	Baltimore, Maryland	No			
Amelio Morán	70	OL	6 ft 5 in	311 lbs	Redshirt Senior	Virginia Beach, Virginia	No			
Christian Teague	92	DL	6 ft 6 in	278 lbs	Senior	Hagerstown, Maryland	No			

=== Outgoing transfers ===
16 players elected to enter the NCAA transfer portal during or after the 2023 season.

Name	Pos.	New school
Kobi Thomas	LB	None
Corey Coley Jr.	CB	NC State
Corey Dyches	TE	California
Jaishawn Barham	LB	Michigan
Gavin Gibson	CB	East Carolina
Rico Walker	TE	Auburn
Ja'Kavion Nonar	OL	FAU
Ramon Brown	RB	None
Riyad Wilmot	DL	None
Tamarcus Cooley	CB	NC State
Avantae Williams	S	None
Tyrese Chambers	WR	None
Antwain Littleton	RB	Temple
Taulia Tagovailoa	QB	None
Khristopher Love	OL	None
Fa'Najae Gotay	LB	Auburn

=== Incoming transfers ===
The Terrapins added seven players from the NCAA transfer portal.

Name	Pos.	Previous school
Jalen Huskey	CB	Bowling Green
MJ Morris	QB	NC State
Josh Kaltenberger	OL	Purdue
Aliou Bah	OL	Georgia
Alan Herron	OL	Shorter
Bryce McFerson	P	Notre Dame
Isaiah Wright	OL	Buffalo

=== Recruits ===
College recruiting (2024)
Name	Hometown	School	Height	Weight	Commit date
Brandon Jacob; Safety	Orlando, Florida	Maynard Evans High School	6 ft 2 in (1.88 m)	170 lb (77 kg)	Jul 20, 2023
Brandon Jacob; Safety	Recruit ratings: Rivals: 247Sports: ESPN: (82)				
DeJuan Williams; Running back	Baltimore, Maryland	Saint Frances Academy	5 ft 10.5 in (1.79 m)	195 lb (88 kg)	Jul 2, 2023
DeJuan Williams; Running back	Recruit ratings: Rivals: 247Sports: ESPN: (80)				
Kevyn Humes; Cornerback	Baltimore, Maryland	Saint Frances Academy	5 ft 11 in (1.80 m)	170 lb (77 kg)	Jan 31, 2024
Kevyn Humes; Cornerback	Recruit ratings: Rivals: 247Sports: ESPN: (80)				
Braydon Lee; Cornerback	Springdale, Maryland	Charles Herbert Flowers High School	6 ft 0 in (1.83 m)	160 lb (73 kg)	Dec 20, 2023
Braydon Lee; Cornerback	Recruit ratings: Rivals: 247Sports: ESPN: (79)				
Ryan Howerton; Offensive tackle	Laurel, Maryland	St. Vincent Pallotti High School	6 ft 4 in (1.93 m)	295 lb (134 kg)	Jul 15, 2023
Ryan Howerton; Offensive tackle	Recruit ratings: Rivals: 247Sports: ESPN: (79)				
Mekhai White; Wide receiver	King George, Virginia	King George High School	6 ft 3 in (1.91 m)	180 lb (82 kg)	Aug 8, 2023
Mekhai White; Wide receiver	Recruit ratings: Rivals: 247Sports: ESPN: (78)				
Keyshawn Flowers; Inside linebacker	Severn, Maryland	Archbishop Spalding High School	6 ft 2 in (1.88 m)	215 lb (98 kg)	Jun 30, 2023
Keyshawn Flowers; Inside linebacker	Recruit ratings: Rivals: 247Sports: ESPN: (78)				
Dimitry Nicolas; Defensive tackle	Miami, Florida	Miami Norland High School	6 ft 3 in (1.91 m)	295 lb (134 kg)	Feb 7, 2024
Dimitry Nicolas; Defensive tackle	Recruit ratings: Rivals: 247Sports: ESPN: (78)				
Keyari James; Inside linebacker	Clearwater, Florida	Clearwater Academy International	6 ft 1 in (1.85 m)	225 lb (102 kg)	Jun 11, 2023
Keyari James; Inside linebacker	Recruit ratings: Rivals: 247Sports: ESPN: (77)				
Logan Bennett; Offensive tackle	Baltimore, Maryland	Saint Frances Academy	6 ft 5 in (1.96 m)	300 lb (140 kg)	Dec 20, 2023
Logan Bennett; Offensive tackle	Recruit ratings: Rivals: 247Sports: ESPN: (77)				
Lloyd Irvin; Cornerback	Springdale, Maryland	Charles Herbert Flowers High School	6 ft 2 in (1.88 m)	175 lb (79 kg)	Jul 1, 2023
Lloyd Irvin; Cornerback	Recruit ratings: Rivals: 247Sports: ESPN: (77)				
Anthony Reddick; Outside linebacker	Hampton, Virginia	Phoebus High School	6 ft 2 in (1.88 m)	220 lb (100 kg)	Apr 16, 2023
Anthony Reddick; Outside linebacker	Recruit ratings: Rivals: 247Sports: ESPN: (77)				
Davon Watkins; Offensive tackle	Annapolis, Maryland	St. Mary's High School	6 ft 4 in (1.93 m)	315 lb (143 kg)	Sep 5, 2023
Davon Watkins; Offensive tackle	Recruit ratings: Rivals: 247Sports: ESPN: (76)				
Josiah McLaurin; Running back	Clinton, North Carolina	Clinton High School	5 ft 11 in (1.80 m)	185 lb (84 kg)	Jun 18, 2023
Josiah McLaurin; Running back	Recruit ratings: Rivals: 247Sports: ESPN: (76)				
Trevor Szymanski; Offensive tackle	Towson, Maryland	Loyola Blakefield	6 ft 5 in (1.96 m)	280 lb (130 kg)	Oct 9, 2023
Trevor Szymanski; Offensive tackle	Recruit ratings: Rivals: 247Sports: ESPN: (76)				
Lakhi Roland; Cornerback	Ellenwood, Georgia	Cedar Grove High School	6 ft 0 in (1.83 m)	175 lb (79 kg)	Apr 12, 2023
Lakhi Roland; Cornerback	Recruit ratings: Rivals: 247Sports: ESPN: (76)				
Jahmari Powell-Wonson; Wide receiver	Baltimore, Maryland	Baltimore City College	6 ft 1 in (1.85 m)	185 lb (84 kg)	May 4, 2023
Jahmari Powell-Wonson; Wide receiver	Recruit ratings: Rivals: 247Sports: ESPN: (76)				
Judah Jenkins; Cornerback	Olney, Maryland	Our Lady of Good Counsel High School	5 ft 11 in (1.80 m)	175 lb (79 kg)	Dec 20, 2023
Judah Jenkins; Cornerback	Recruit ratings: Rivals: 247Sports: ESPN: (75)				
Khristian Martin; Quarterback	Highland Springs, Virginia	Highland Springs High School	6 ft 3 in (1.91 m)	215 lb (98 kg)	Jul 30, 2023
Khristian Martin; Quarterback	Recruit ratings: Rivals: 247Sports: ESPN: (75)				
Michael McMonigle; Offensive tackle	York, Pennsylvania	William Penn High School	6 ft 5 in (1.96 m)	290 lb (130 kg)	Jun 18, 2023
Michael McMonigle; Offensive tackle	Recruit ratings: Rivals: 247Sports: ESPN: (75)				
Terez Davis; Offensive guard	Hyattsville, Maryland	DeMatha Catholic High School	6 ft 5 in (1.96 m)	260 lb (120 kg)	Jun 18, 2023
Terez Davis; Offensive guard	Recruit ratings: Rivals: 247Sports: ESPN: (75)				
Anthony Robsock; Offensive tackle	Harrisburg, Pennsylvania	Central Dauphin East High School	6 ft 5 in (1.96 m)	280 lb (130 kg)	Jun 11, 2023
Anthony Robsock; Offensive tackle	Recruit ratings: Rivals: 247Sports: ESPN: (74)				
Michael Hershey; Offensive guard	Spring Grove, Pennsylvania	Spring Grove Area High School	6 ft 4 in (1.93 m)	265 lb (120 kg)	Jun 18, 2023
Michael Hershey; Offensive guard	Recruit ratings: Rivals: 247Sports: ESPN: (74)				
Shamar McIntosh; Safety	Washington, District of Columbia	St. John's College High School	6 ft 1 in (1.85 m)	185 lb (84 kg)	Dec 10, 2023
Shamar McIntosh; Safety	Recruit ratings: Rivals: 247Sports: ESPN: (73)				
Overall recruit ranking: Rivals: #31 247Sports: #38
Note: In many cases, Scout, Rivals, 247Sports, On3, and ESPN may conflict in their listings of height and weight.; In these cases, the average was taken. ESPN grades are on a 100-point scale.; Sources: "Rivals commits". Rivals.; "ESPN commits". ESPN.; "2024 Team Ranking". Rivals.com.; "247Sports commits". 247Sports.
