= 2023 Music City Bowl =

Postseason college football bowl game

2023 TransPerfect Music City Bowl
- 25th Music City Bowl
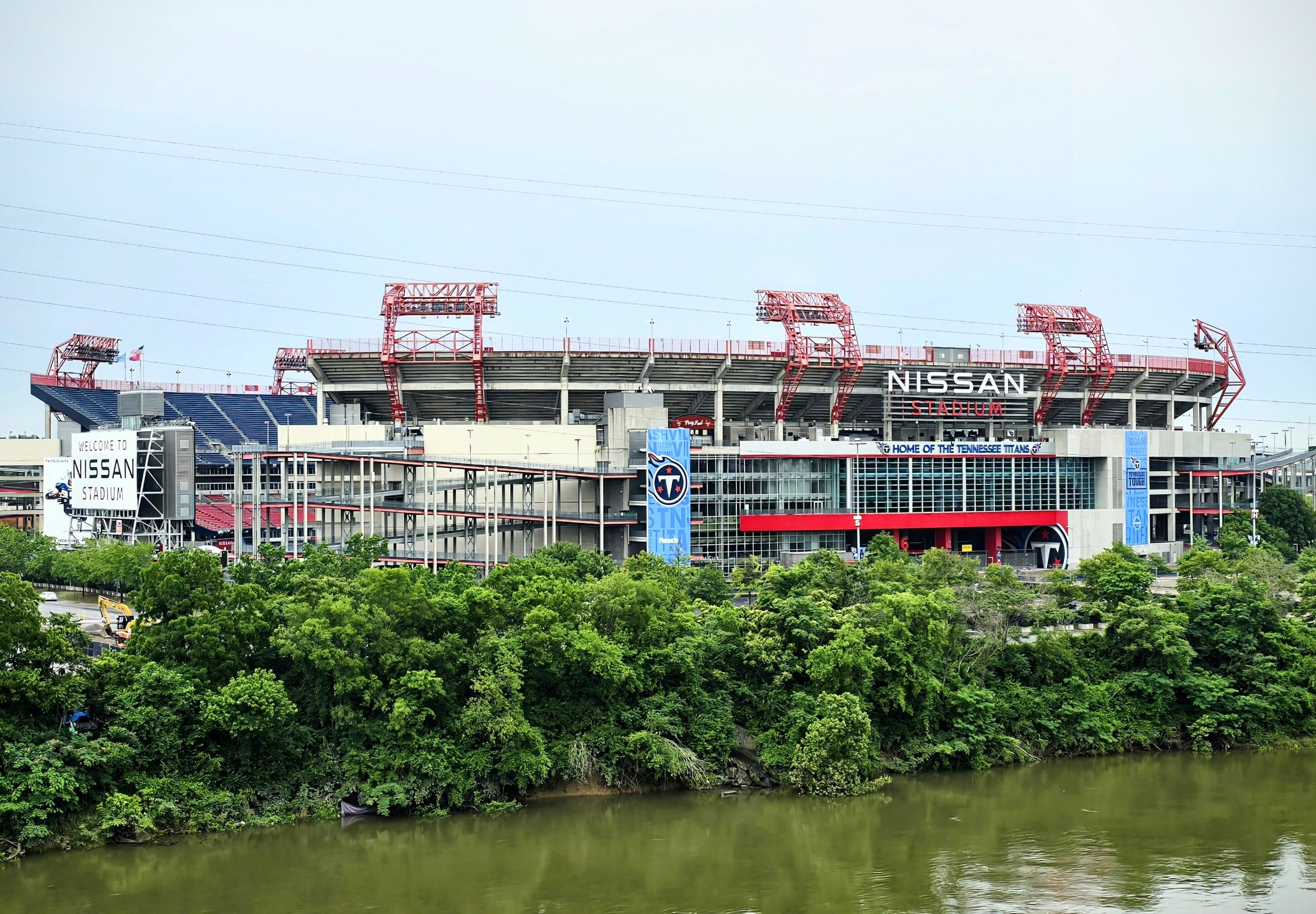
- Nissan Stadium in Nashville, Tennessee, hosted the Music City Bowl.
Auburn Tigers	Maryland Terrapins
(6–6)	(7–5)
SEC	Big Ten
13	31
Head coach: Hugh Freeze	Head coach: Mike Locksley
	1	2	3	4	Total
Auburn	0	7	0	6	13
Maryland	21	3	7	0	31
- Date: December 30, 2023
- Season: 2023
- Stadium: Nissan Stadium
- Location: Nashville, Tennessee
- MVP: Billy Edwards Jr. (QB, Maryland)
- Favorite: Auburn by 5.5
- Referee: David Alvarez (Big 12)
- Attendance: 50,088

United States TV coverage
- Network: ABC
- Announcers: Taylor Zarzour (play-by-play); Matt Stinchcomb (analyst); Alyssa Lang (sideline)

The 2023 Music City Bowl was a college football bowl game played on December 30, 2023, at Nissan Stadium in Nashville, Tennessee. The 25th annual Music City Bowl featured Auburn of the Southeastern Conference (SEC) and Maryland of the Big Ten Conference. The game began at approximately 1:00 p.m. CST and was aired on ABC. The Music City Bowl was one of the 2023–24 bowl games concluding the 2023 FBS football season. The game was sponsored by translation and language services company TransPerfect and was officially known as the TransPerfect Music City Bowl.

== Teams ==
Consistent with conference tie-ins, the bowl featured the Auburn Tigers of the Southeastern Conference (SEC) and the Maryland Terrapins of the Big Ten Conference.

This was the fourth meeting between Auburn and Maryland; entering the bowl, the Tigers led the Terrapins in the all-time series, 2–1.

=== Auburn Tigers ===
The Tigers entered the game with a 6–6 record (3–5 in the SEC), having finished in fifth place in their conference's West Division.

This was Auburn's third Music City Bowl, tying Minnesota and Tennessee for the second-most appearances in the game. The Tigers previously won the 2003 edition and the 2018 edition.

=== Maryland Terrapins ===
The Terrapins entered the game with a 7–5 record (4–5 in the Big Ten), having finished in fourth place in their conference's East Division.

This was Maryland's first Music City Bowl.

== Game summary ==
2023 TransPerfect Music City Bowl

Quarter	1	2	3	4	Total
Auburn	0	7	0	6	13
Maryland	21	3	7	0	31

at Nissan Stadium • Nashville, Tennessee

- Date: Saturday, December 30, 2023
- Game time: 1:00 p.m. CST
- Game weather: Cloudy • Temperature: 40 °F (4 °C) • Wind: 9 mph (14 km/h) SW
- Game attendance: 50,088
- Referee: David Alvarez
- TV announcers (ABC): Taylor Zarzour (play-by-play), Matt Stinchcomb (analyst), and Alyssa Lang (sideline)
- Box score

Game information

First quarter

- (13:11) MD – Billy Edwards Jr. 2 yard run, Jack Howes kick (Drive: 5 plays, 75 yards, 1:49; Maryland 7–0)
- (5:58) MD – Preston Howard 5 yard pass from Billy Edwards Jr., Jack Howes kick (Drive: 11 plays, 75 yards, 5:26; Maryland 14–0)
- (3:24) MD – Dylan Wade 3 yard pass from Cameron Edge, Jack Howes kick (Drive: 3 plays, 76 yards, 1:26; Maryland 21–0)

Second quarter

- (2:34) AUB – Brandon Frazier 3-yard pass from Payton Thorne, Alex McPherson kick (Drive: 14 plays, 80 yards, 4:56; Maryland 21–7)
- (0:08) MD – Jack Howes 49 yard field goal (Drive: 9 plays, 38 yards, 2:26; Maryland 24–7)

Third quarter

- (11:05) MD – Glendon Miller 44 yard interception return, Jack Howes kick (Drive: 4 plays, 10 yards, 1:28; Maryland 31–7)

Fourth quarter

- (6:53) AUB – Jeremiah Cobb 1 yard run, two-point pass conversion failed (Drive: 3 plays, 66 yards, 0:58; Maryland 31–13)

=== Statistics ===
Statistics	AUB	MAR
First downs	20	15
Plays–yards	77–300	59–310
Rushes–yards	35–76	32–102
Passing yards	224	208
Passing: comp–att–int	21–42–2	10–26–1
Time of possession	31:52	28:08

Team	Category	Player	Statistics
Auburn	Passing	Hank Brown	7/9, 132 YDS
Auburn	Rushing	Jarquez Hunter	13 Car, 44 YDS
Auburn	Receiving	Caleb Burton III	5 Rec, 78 YDS
Maryland	Passing	Billy Edwards Jr.	6/20, 126 YDS, 1 TD
Maryland	Rushing	Billy Edwards Jr.	13 Car, 50 YDS, 1 TD
Maryland	Receiving	Roman Hemby	1 Rec, 61 YDS
