= Billy Edwards Jr. =

American football player (born 2003)

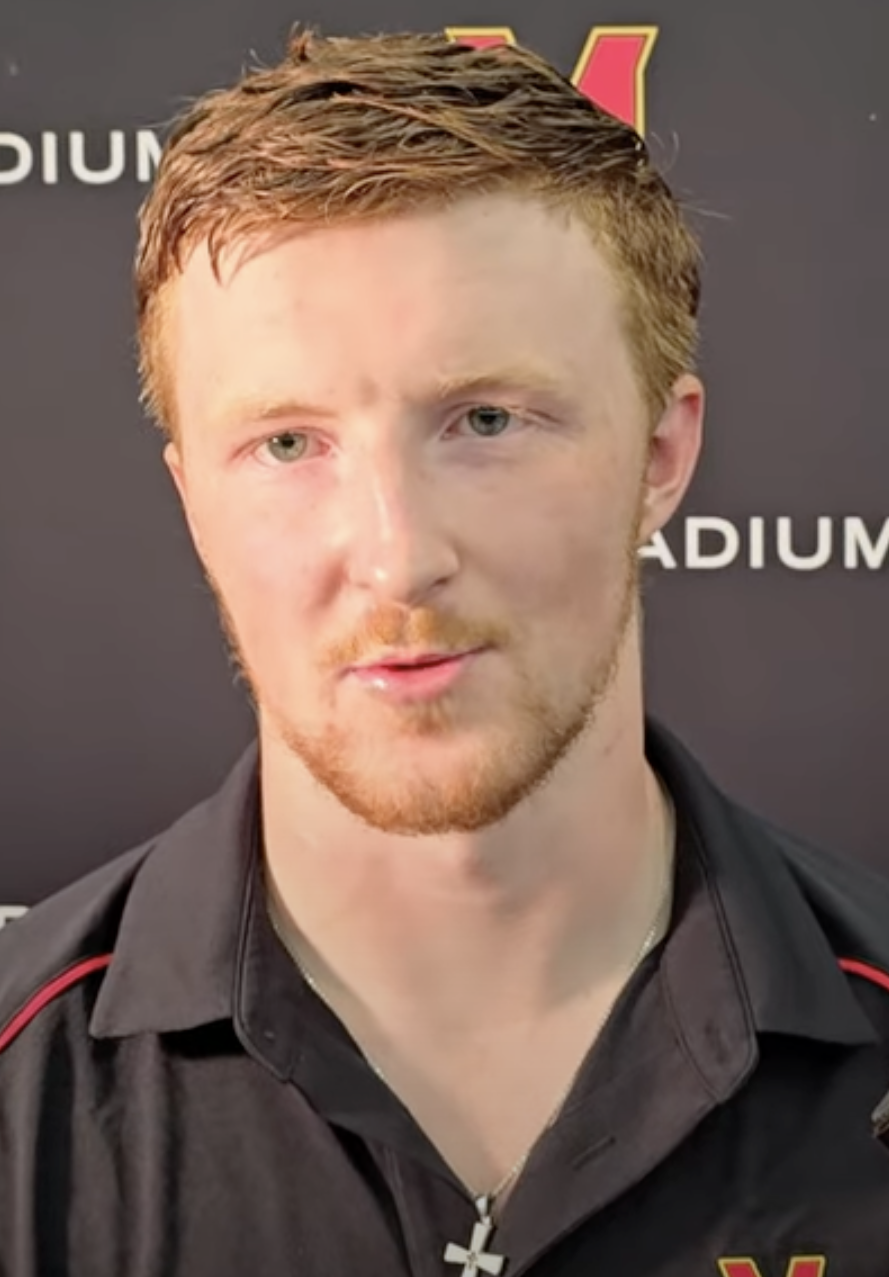
- Edwards Jr. in 2024

No. 9 – North Carolina Tar Heels
- Position: Quarterback
- Class: (redshirt) Senior

Personal information
- Born: January 11, 2003 (age 23)
- Listed height: 6 ft 3 in (1.91 m)
- Listed weight: 228 lb (103 kg)

Career information
- High school: Lake Braddock (Burke, Virginia)
- College: Wake Forest (2021); Maryland (2022–2024); Wisconsin (2025); North Carolina (2026–present)

Awards and highlights
- Music City Bowl MVP (2023)
- Stats at ESPN

Billy Edwards Jr. (born January 11, 2003) is an American college football quarterback for the North Carolina Tar Heels. He previously played for the Wake Forest Demon Deacons, Maryland Terrapins, and Wisconsin Badgers.

== Early life ==
Edwards grew up in Springfield, Virginia, and attended Lake Braddock Secondary School. He was rated as a three-star recruit and committed to play college football for the Wake Forest Demon Deacons.

== College career ==
=== Wake Forest ===
Edwards took a redshirt season in 2021. After the conclusion of the season, Edwards entered the NCAA transfer portal.

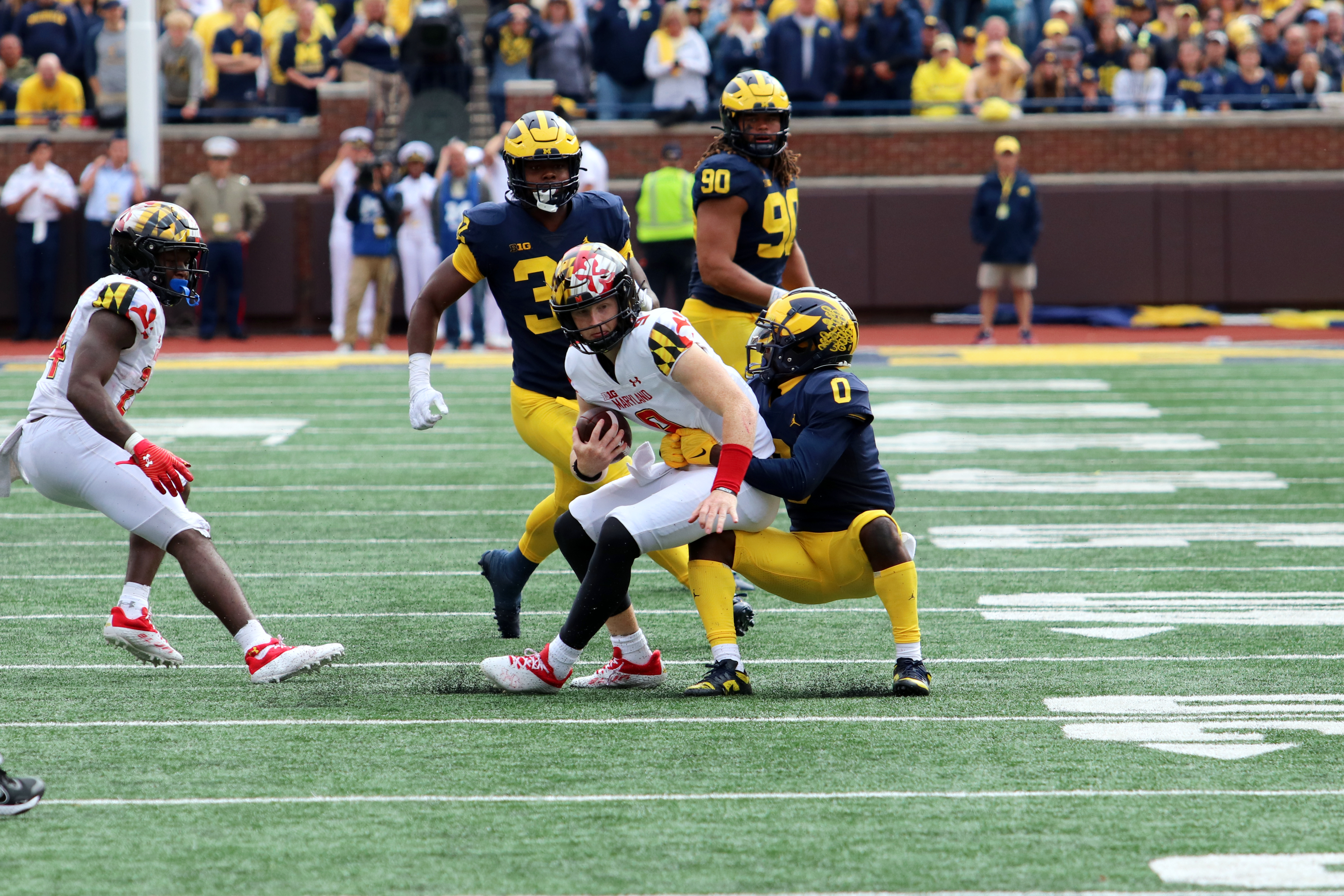
Edwards in 2022.

=== Maryland ===
==== 2022 season ====
Edwards transferred to play for the Maryland Terrapins. In week 7 of the 2022 season, he replaced injured starter Taulia Tagovailoa and led the Terrapins on a game-winning touchdown drive as he punched in a rushing touchdown to help Maryland beat Indiana 38-33. In his first collegiate start in 2022, Edwards completed 18 of 28 passes for 166 yards and a touchdown while also adding 66 yards on the ground in a win over Northwestern. Edwards finished the 2022 season by completing 28 of his 46 passing attempts for 313 yards and three touchdowns with no interceptions while also rushing 34 times for 136 yards and a touchdown.

==== 2023 season ====
With Tagovailoa opting out, Edwards was announced as the team's starting quarterback for the 2023 Music City Bowl. In the team's Bowl Game, Edwards threw and ran for a touchdown in a 31–13 win over Auburn and was named the bowl's MVP. Edwards finished the 2023 season going ten for 30 passing for 128 yards and a touchdown with one interception, while also adding 91 yards and seven touchdowns on the ground.

==== 2024 season ====
Edwards entered the 2024 season as the starting quarterback.

=== Wisconsin ===
On December 16, 2024, Edwards announced he was transferring to the Wisconsin Badgers.

In the Badgers' opening game of the 2025 season against Miami (OH), Edwards suffered a left knee injury that ruled him out of the Badgers' next two games. He briefly returned to face his old team, Maryland, but exited after completing one offensive series. Edwards would not play in any games for the rest of the season, claiming the injury was a Grade 3 PCL Sprain.

Following the season, on December 29, 2025, Edwards announced he would be entering the transfer portal after being granted a medical redshirt and sixth season of eligibility.

=== North Carolina ===
On January 9, 2026, Edwards announced he was transferring to the North Carolina Tar Heels, joining head coach Bill Belichick and his newly hired offensive coordinator Bobby Petrino. On August 18, Edwards was named as the team's starter entering the regular season.

== Career statistics ==
Season	Team	Games			Passing								Rushing			
Season	Team	GP	GS	Record	Cmp	Att	Pct	Yds	Y/A	TD	Int	Rtg	Att	Yds	Avg	TD
2021	Wake Forest	0	0	—	Redshirted (redshirt)											
2022	Maryland	7	2	2–0	28	46	60.9	313	6.8	3	0	139.5	34	136	4.0	1
2023	Maryland	8	1	1–0	10	30	33.3	128	4.3	1	1	73.5	29	91	3.1	7
2024	Maryland	11	11	4–7	273	420	65.0	2,881	6.9	15	9	130.1	81	148	1.8	5
2025	Wisconsin	2	2	1–1	7	16	43.8	113	7.1	0	0	103.1	0	0	0.0	0
2026	North Carolina	9	9	5–4	178	273	65.2	2,127	7.8	18	6	148.1	47	20	0.4	0
Career		37	25	13-12	496	785	63.2	5,557	7.1	37	16	134.1	191	397	2.1	13

== Personal life ==
Edwards is the son of Billy Sr. and Elizabeth Edwards. Edwards is a Christian.
