= Tamarcus Cooley =

American football player

No. 0 – LSU Tigers
- Position: Safety
- Class: Junior

Personal information
- Listed height: 6 ft 0 in (1.83 m)
- Listed weight: 209 lb (95 kg)

Career information
- High school: Rolesville (Rolesville, North Carolina)
- College: Maryland (2023); NC State (2024); LSU (2025–present)
- Stats at ESPN

Tamarcus Cooley is an American college football safety for the LSU Tigers. He previously played for the Maryland Terrapins and NC State Wolfpack.

== Early life ==
Cooley attended Rolesville High School in Rolesville, North Carolina, where he was a defensive back and wide receiver. As a senior, he had 54 tackles, two interceptions and to sacks on defense and 31 receptions for 426 yards and 8 touchdowns on offense. He originally committed to play college football at North Carolina State University before flipping his commitment to the University of Maryland, College Park.

== College career ==
Cooley played in two games with four tackles and redshirted his lone season at Maryland in 2023. He entered the transfer portal and committed to NC State. In his only season with NC State in 2024, he started nine of 13 games and recorded 39 tackles, three interceptions and one sack. Cooley entered the transfer portal again after the season and committed to Louisiana State University (LSU). He started all 13 games his first year at LSU in 2025, recording 72 tackles and two interceptions. He returned to LSU in 2026.
