= Kaden Prather =

American football player (born 2002)

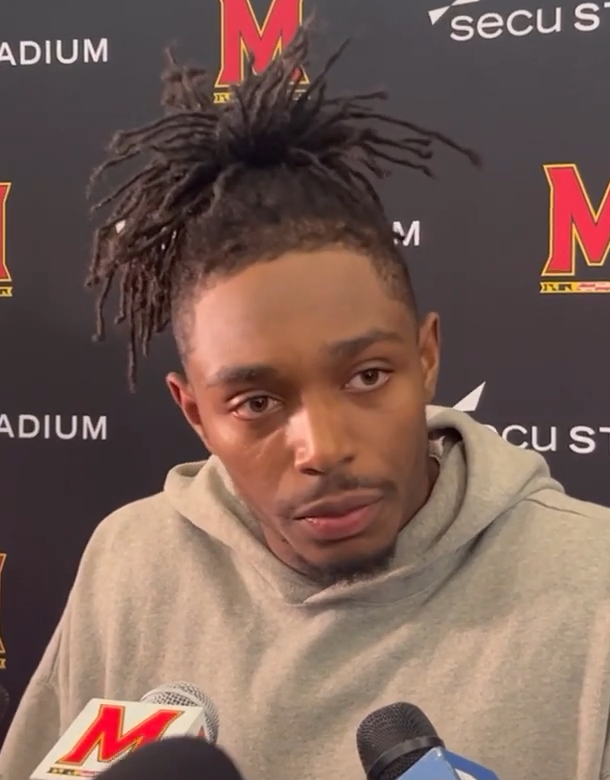
- Prather with the Maryland Terrapins in 2023

Profile
- Position: Wide receiver

Personal information
- Born: September 6, 2002 (age 24); Montgomery Village, Maryland, U.S.
- Listed height: 6 ft 3 in (1.91 m)
- Listed weight: 204 lb (93 kg)

Career information
- High school: Northwest (Germantown, Maryland)
- College: West Virginia (2021–2022); Maryland (2023–2024)
- NFL draft: 2025: 7th round, 240th overall pick

Career history
- Buffalo Bills (2025)*; Louisville Kings (2026); Green Bay Packers (2026)*
- * Offseason or practice squad member only

Awards and highlights
- UFL champion (2026)
- Stats at Pro Football Reference

Kaden Prather (born September 6, 2002) is an American professional football wide receiver. He played college football for the West Virginia Mountaineers and Maryland Terrapins. Prather was selected by the Bills in the seventh round of the 2025 NFL draft.

== Early life ==
Prather attended Northwest High School in Germantown, Maryland, where he had 844 receiving yards as a junior. He was rated as a four-star recruit and committed to play college football for the West Virginia Mountaineers.

== College career ==
=== West Virginia ===
As a freshman in 2021, Prather notched 12 receptions for 175 yards. In 2022, he hauled in eight receptions for 109 yards and a touchdown in a win over Baylor. Prather finished the 2022 season with 52 receptions for 501 yards and three touchdowns. After the season, he entered the NCAA transfer portal.

=== Maryland ===
Prather transferred to play for the Maryland Terrapins. In week 6 of the 2023 season, he hauled in a 15-yard one-handed touchdown reception versus Ohio State. In the 2023 season, Prather brought in 42 receptions for 666 yards and five touchdowns, while also adding 36 yards on the ground.

== Professional career ==
Pre-draft measurables
Height	Weight	Arm length	Hand span	Wingspan	40-yard dash	10-yard split	20-yard split	20-yard shuttle	Vertical jump	Broad jump
6 ft 3 1/2 in (1.92 m)	204 lb (93 kg)	31 7/8 in (0.81 m)	9 1/4 in (0.23 m)	6 ft 5 5/8 in (1.97 m)	4.46 s	1.53 s	2.64 s	4.14 s	30.0 in (0.76 m)	9 ft 6 in (2.90 m)
All values from NFL Combine/Pro Day

=== Buffalo Bills ===
Prather was selected by the Buffalo Bills in the seventh round (240th overall) of the 2025 NFL draft. He was waived on August 19 with an injury designation and reverted to injured reserve the following day. On August 28, Prather was waived with an injury settlement.

=== Louisville Kings ===
On January 14, 2026, Prather was selected by the Louisville Kings of the United Football League (UFL).

=== Green Bay Packers ===
On July 30, 2026, Prather signed with the Green Bay Packers. On August 30, he was released by the Packers as a part of final roster cuts.
