= Dylan Wade =

American football player

No. 0 – UCF Knights
- Position: Tight end
- Class: Senior

Personal information
- Listed height: 6 ft 2 in (1.88 m)
- Listed weight: 240 lb (109 kg)

Career information
- High school: Jones (Orlando, Florida)
- College: Maryland (2023–2024); UCF (2025–present)
- Stats at ESPN

Dylan Wade is an American football tight end for the UCF Knights. He previously played for the Maryland Terrapins.

== Early life ==
Wade attended Jones High School in Orlando, Florida. He was rated as a three-star recruit by 247Sports, receiving offers from schools such as Maryland, Miami, North Carolina, Ole Miss, Purdue, and West Virginia. Wade committed to play college football for the Maryland Terrapins.

== College career ==
In two years at Maryland in 2023 and 2024, Wade played in 23 games, notching 33 receptions for 395 yards and four touchdowns. After the 2024 season, he entered the NCAA transfer portal.

Wade transferred to play for the UCF Knights. In week 13 of the 2025 season, he recorded four receptions for 145 yards and two touchdowns, including a team-long 84-yard touchdown catch, in a win over Oklahoma State. Wade finished the 2025 season with 43 receptions for 523 yards and five touchdowns in 11 games played, earning all-Big 12 honorable mention. He also set the school record for receptions and receiving yards by a tight end in a single season.
