= Roman Hemby =

American football player (born 2002)

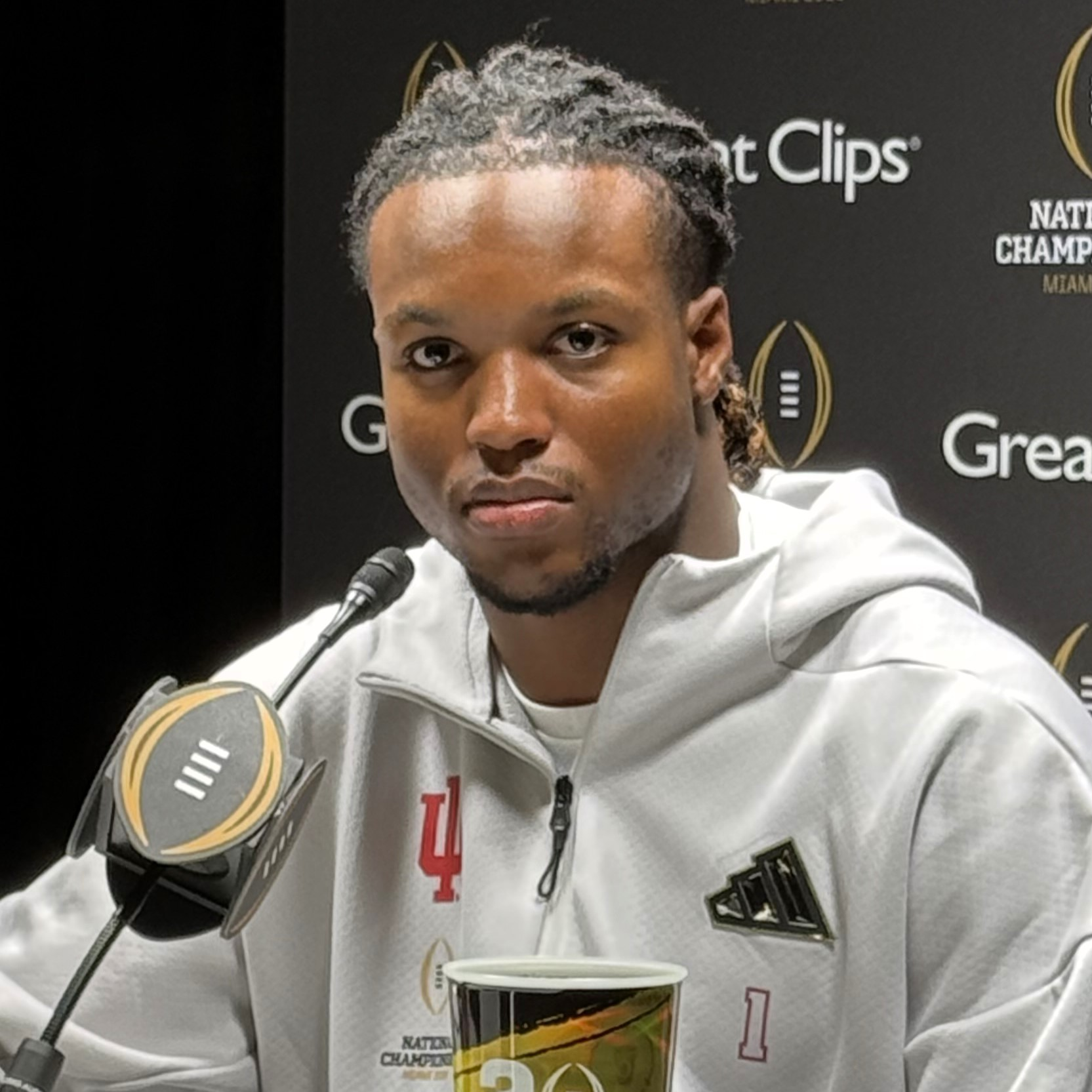
- Hemby in 2026

No. 37 – Las Vegas Raiders
- Position: Running back
- Roster status: Practice squad

Personal information
- Born: August 16, 2002 (age 24)
- Listed height: 6 ft 0 in (1.83 m)
- Listed weight: 210 lb (95 kg)

Career information
- High school: The John Carroll School (Bel Air, Maryland)
- College: Maryland (2021–2024); Indiana (2025)
- NFL draft: 2026: undrafted

Career history
- Las Vegas Raiders (2026–present)

Awards and highlights
- CFP national champion (2025); Third-team All-Big Ten (2025)
- Stats at Pro Football Reference

Roman Hemby (born August 16, 2002) is an American professional football running back for the Las Vegas Raiders of the National Football League (NFL). He previously played for the Maryland Terrapins and the Indiana Hoosiers and was signed by the Raiders as an undrafted free agent.

== Early life ==
Hemby grew up in Edgewood, Maryland, and attended The John Carroll School. Hemby was rated a three-star recruit and committed to play college football at Maryland over offers from Appalachian State, Duke, NC State, Vanderbilt, and West Virginia.

== College career ==
Hemby played in four games and rushed 17 times for 71 yards and two touchdowns as a true freshman before redshirting the season. Hemby entered his redshirt freshman year as one of the Terrapins' primary running backs alongside Antwain Littleton II. He was named the Big Ten Conference Freshman of the Week after rushing for 114 yards and two touchdowns on seven carries in Maryland's season opener against Buffalo. Hemby repeated as the conference Freshman of the Week after rushing for 179 yards and three touchdowns in a 31–24 win over Northwestern. He was also named The Athletic's midseason Freshman All-American.

Hemby transferred to play the 2025 season for the Indiana Hoosiers, earning a key role on the team's offense alongside fellow running back Kaelon Black. Against his former team, the Maryland Terrapins, he rushed for 117 yards and a touchdown in a 55–10 Indiana win. He added 89 rushing yards and a touchdown in a 38–3 win against the Alabama Crimson Tide in the 2026 Rose Bowl. Hemby rushed for 60 yards in Indiana's 27–21 win against the Miami Hurricanes in the 2026 College Football Playoff National Championship.

== Professional career ==
Pre-draft measurables
Height	Weight	Arm length	Hand span	Wingspan	40-yard dash	10-yard split	20-yard split	20-yard shuttle	Vertical jump	Broad jump	Bench press
5 ft 11 7/8 in (1.83 m)	207 lb (94 kg)	31 in (0.79 m)	9 1/2 in (0.24 m)	6 ft 3 3/4 in (1.92 m)	4.56 s	1.62 s	2.69 s	4.52 s	35.5 in (0.90 m)	10 ft 5 in (3.18 m)	15 reps
All values from NFL Combine/Pro Day

Hemby signed with the Las Vegas Raiders as an undrafted free agent on April 30, 2026. He was waived by the Raiders as a part of final roster cuts on August 30. The following day, Hemby was re–signed to Las Vegas' practice squad.
