= 2021 Maryland Terrapins football team =

American college football season

2021 Maryland Terrapins football

Pinstripe Bowl champion

Pinstripe Bowl, W 54–10 vs. Virginia Tech
- Conference: Big Ten Conference
- East Division
- Record: 7–6 (3–6 Big Ten)
- Head coach: Mike Locksley (3rd season)
- Offensive coordinator: Dan Enos (1st season)
- Offensive scheme: Pro spread
- Defensive coordinator: Brian Stewart (4th season)
- Base defense: 3–4
- Home stadium: Maryland Stadium

2021 Big Ten Conference football standings
	Conf.			Overall
Team	W		L	W		L
East Division
No. 3 Michigan xy$^	8	–	1	12	–	2
No. 6 Ohio State x	8	–	1	11	–	2
No. 9 Michigan State	7	–	2	11	–	2
Penn State	4	–	5	7	–	6
Maryland	3	–	6	7	–	6
Rutgers	2	–	7	5	–	8
Indiana	0	–	9	2	–	10
West Division
No. 23 Iowa xy	7	–	2	10	–	4
Minnesota	6	–	3	9	–	4
Wisconsin	6	–	3	9	–	4
Purdue	6	–	3	9	–	4
Illinois	4	–	5	5	–	7
Nebraska	1	–	8	3	–	9
Northwestern	1	–	8	3	–	9
Championship: Michigan 42, Iowa 3
^ – College Football Playoff participant; $ – Conference champion; x – Division champion/co-champions; y – Championship game participant; Rankings from AP Poll

The 2021 Maryland Terrapins football team represented the University of Maryland during the 2021 NCAA Division I FBS football season. The Terrapins played their home games at Maryland Stadium in College Park, Maryland, and competed in the Big Ten Conference in the East Division. The team was coached by third-year head coach Mike Locksley and finished in fifth place in the East Division. The Terrapins defeated Virginia Tech in the Pinstripe Bowl to achieve their first bowl game since 2016, their first winning season since 2014, and their first bowl game victory since 2010.

== Offseason ==
The Terrapins finished the 2020 season 2–3 in Big Ten play to finish in fourth place in the East Division.

=== Recruiting ===
College recruiting (2021)
Name	Hometown	School	Height	Weight	Commit date
Tommy Akingbesote; DL	Upper Marlboro, MD	Charles Herbert Flowers High School	6 ft 4 in (1.93 m)	270 lb (120 kg)	May 27, 2020
Tommy Akingbesote; DL	Recruit ratings: Rivals: 247Sports: ESPN: (83)				
Joseph Bearns; TE	Baltimore, MD	St. Frances Academy	6 ft 2 in (1.88 m)	245 lb (111 kg)	Feb 5, 2020
Joseph Bearns; TE	Recruit ratings: Rivals: 247Sports: ESPN: (76)				
Terrance Butler; DL	Baltimore, MD	St. Frances Academy	6 ft 3 in (1.91 m)	220 lb (100 kg)	Jun 1, 2020
Terrance Butler; DL	Recruit ratings: Rivals: 247Sports: ESPN: (77)				
Corey Coley Jr. DB	Jacksonville, FL	Trinity Christian Academy	6 ft 1 in (1.85 m)	170 lb (77 kg)	Jul 25, 2020
Corey Coley Jr. DB	Recruit ratings: Rivals: 247Sports: ESPN: (78)				
CJ Dippre; TE	Jermyn, PA	Lakeland High School	6 ft 5 in (1.96 m)	245 lb (111 kg)	May 10, 2020
CJ Dippre; TE	Recruit ratings: Rivals: 247Sports: ESPN: (75)				
Tai Felton; WR	Asburn, VA	Stone Bridge High School	6 ft 2 in (1.88 m)	172 lb (78 kg)	Nov 21, 2019
Tai Felton; WR	Recruit ratings: Rivals: 247Sports: ESPN: (78)				
Roman Hemby; RB	Bel Air, MD	The John Carroll School	6 ft 0 in (1.83 m)	195 lb (88 kg)	Aug 16, 2020
Roman Hemby; RB	Recruit ratings: Rivals: 247Sports: ESPN: (72)				
Leron Husbands; TE	Washington DC	Charles Herbert Flowers High School	6 ft 3 in (1.91 m)	207 lb (94 kg)	Feb 27, 2020
Leron Husbands; TE	Recruit ratings: Rivals: 247Sports: ESPN: (75)				
Darrell Jackson; DL	Havana, FL	Gadsden County High School	6 ft 5 in (1.96 m)	258 lb (117 kg)	Dec 10, 2020
Darrell Jackson; DL	Recruit ratings: Rivals: 247Sports: ESPN: (77)				
Branden Jennings; LB	Jacksonville, FL	Sandalwood High School	6 ft 3 in (1.91 m)	225 lb (102 kg)	Dec 16, 2020
Branden Jennings; LB	Recruit ratings: Rivals: 247Sports: ESPN: (86)				
Taize Johnson; DL	Washington DC	St. John's College High School	6 ft 1 in (1.85 m)	290 lb (130 kg)	Jan 26, 2020
Taize Johnson; DL	Recruit ratings: Rivals: 247Sports: ESPN: (82)				
Terrence Lewis; LB	Opa Locka, FL	Miami Central Senior High School	6 ft 1 in (1.85 m)	200 lb (91 kg)	Jan 2, 2021
Terrence Lewis; LB	Recruit ratings: Rivals: 247Sports: ESPN: (90)				
Antwain Littleton; RB	Washington DC	St. John's College High School	6 ft 0 in (1.83 m)	265 lb (120 kg)	Feb 1, 2020
Antwain Littleton; RB	Recruit ratings: Rivals: 247Sports: ESPN: (82)				
Kyle Long; OL	Florissant, MO	Hazelwood Central High School	6 ft 6 in (1.98 m)	300 lb (140 kg)	Aug 5, 2020
Kyle Long; OL	Recruit ratings: Rivals: 247Sports: ESPN: (72)				
Colby McDonald; RB	Washington DC	St. John's College High School	5 ft 10 in (1.78 m)	200 lb (91 kg)	May 15, 2020
Colby McDonald; RB	Recruit ratings: Rivals: 247Sports: ESPN: (75)				
Andre Porter; DL	Washington, PA	Washington High School	6 ft 3 in (1.91 m)	300 lb (140 kg)	Dec 5, 2020
Andre Porter; DL	Recruit ratings: Rivals: 247Sports: ESPN: (80)				
Demeioun Robsinson; DL	Gaithersburg, MD	Quince Orchard High School	6 ft 3 in (1.91 m)	220 lb (100 kg)	Mar 27, 2020
Demeioun Robsinson; DL	Recruit ratings: Rivals: 247Sports: ESPN: (87)				
ZionAngelo Shockley; DL	Baltimore, MD	St. Frances Academy	6 ft 4 in (1.93 m)	230 lb (100 kg)	Feb 1, 2020
ZionAngelo Shockley; DL	Recruit ratings: Rivals: 247Sports: ESPN: (79)				
Gereme Spraggins; LB	Gambrills, MD	Hutchinson Community College	6 ft 2 in (1.88 m)	235 lb (107 kg)	Jan 26, 2020
Gereme Spraggins; LB	Recruit ratings: Rivals: 247Sports: ESPN: (77)				
Dante Trader Jr. DB	Owings Mill, MD	McDonogh School	6 ft 0 in (1.83 m)	180 lb (82 kg)	Nov 8, 2019
Dante Trader Jr. DB	Recruit ratings: Rivals: 247Sports: ESPN: (78)				
Jayon Venerable; DB	Severn, MD	Archbishop Spalding High School	5 ft 11 in (1.80 m)	193 lb (88 kg)	Jul 27, 2019
Jayon Venerable; DB	Recruit ratings: Rivals: 247Sports: ESPN: (76)				
Weston Wolff; TE	Venice, FL	Venice High School	6 ft 4 in (1.93 m)	210 lb (95 kg)	May 9, 2020
Weston Wolff; TE	Recruit ratings: Rivals: 247Sports: ESPN: (75)				

=== Incoming transfers ===
Name	Pos.	Height	Weight	Class	Hometown	College transferred from
Marcus Fleming	WR	5'10"	160	Freshman	Miami, FL	Nebraska

== Roster ==
2021 Maryland Terrapins football team roster
Players
Coaches
Offense

Pos.	#	Name	Class
WR	1	Marcus Fleming	Fr
WR	2	DeaJaun McDougle	So
QB	3	Taulia Tagovailoa	So
RB	4	Isaiah Jacobs	So
WR	5	Rakim Jarrett	So
WR	6	Jeshaun Jones	Jr
WR	7	Dontay Demus Jr.	Sr
RB	8	Tayon Fleet-Davis	Sr
TE	9	Chig Okonkwo	Sr
WR	10	Tai Felton	Fr
QB	10	Zachery Jackson	Fr
QB	11	Reece Udinski	Sr
QB	12	Ryan Duell	Fr
RB	13	Peny Boone	So
QB	14	David Foust	So
WR	15	Brian Cobbs	Sr
WR	16	Dino Tomlin	So
WR	17	Nick DeGennaro	So
TE	18	CJ Dippre	Fr
TE	19	Weston Wolff	Fr
WR	21	Darryl Jones	Sr
QB	22	Eric Najarian	Jr
RB	23	Colby McDonald	Fr
RB	24	Roman Hemby	Fr
TE	26	Justin Brown	Sr
RB	29	Challen Faamatau	Sr
WR	30	Daniel Anderson	Sr
RB	31	Antwain Littleton II	Fr
RB	32	Rashard Jackson	Sr
RB	33	Jha'mel Thorne	Jr
FB	35	Joseph Bearns III	Fr
TE	42	Kameron Blount	So
OL	52	Evan Gregory	Jr
OL	54	Spencer Anderson	Jr
OL	55	Austin Fontaine	Jr
OL	60	Khristopher Love	So
OL	61	Brian Armentrout	So
OL	64	Marcus Finger	So
OL	65	Johari Branch	Sr
OL	67	Tommy Varhall	Fr
OL	68	Sean Wilkins	So
OL	69	Mitchell Gorgas	So
OL	70	Amelio Moran	Jr
OL	71	Jaelyn Duncan	Jr
OL	74	Delmar Glaze	So
OL	75	Ja'Khi Green	So
OL	76	Kyle Long	Fr
RB	77	Zach Perkins	So
OL	78	Mason Lunsford	So
WR	80	Sean Leonard	So
TE	81	Conor Fagan	So
WR	83	Carlos Carriere	Sr
WR	84	Corey Dyches	So
WR	85	Jacob Hess	So
TE	86	Malik Jackson	So

Defense

Pos.	#	Name	Class
LB	0	Terrence Lewis	Fr
DB	2	Jakorian Bennett	Sr
DB	3	Nick Cross	Jr
LB	4	Demeioun Robinson	Fr
DB	6	Corey Coley Jr.	Fr
DB	7	Jayon Venerable	Fr
DL	9	Joseph Boletepeli	Jr
DL	10	Tyler Baylor	Jr
LB	11	Ruben Hyppolite II	So
DB	12	Tarheeb Still	So
DB	14	Isaiah Hazel	Jr
DB	18	Jordan Mosley	Sr
LB	19	Ahmad McCullough	Jr
DB	20	Dante Trader Jr.	Fr
DB	22	Osita Smith	So
LB	23	Fa'Najae Gotay	Jr
DB	24	Kenny Bennett	Sr
DB	25	Beau Brade	So
DB	26	Erwin Byrd	So
DB	27	Devon Dickerson	Sr
DB	29	Devyn King	So
LB	30	Durell Nchami	Jr
DB	32	Shane Mosley	So
DB	33	Deonte Banks	Jr
DL	34	Mosiah Nasili-Kite	Jr
LB	35	Kobi Thomas	Jr
DB	36	Owura Berko	Jr
DB	37	Lavonte Gater	Jr
DB	38	Glendon Miller	So
LB	39	Deshawn Holt	So
DB	41	Rex Fleming	So
LB	44	Branden Jennings	Fr
DL	46	Greg Rose	Sr
LB	49	David Brownlee	Sr
LB	50	Alex Simet	Jr
DL	51	Jacob Purcell	Jr
LB	53	Sean Greeley	Jr
DL	55	Ami Finau	Sr
LB	56	TJ Kautai	Sr
DL	57	Isaac Bunyun	So
DL	58	Tommy Akingbesote	Fr
DL	59	Ryan Brown	So
WR	88	DeJuan Ellis	Jr
DL	89	Anthony Booker Jr.	So
DL	91	Almosse Titi	Jr
DL	92	Darrell Jackson Jr.	Fr
DL	93	Riyad Wilmot	So
DL	95	Lawtez Rogers	Sr
DL	97	Sam Okuayinonu	GS
DL	98	Ernest Shockley	Sr
LB	99	Frankie Burgess	So

Special teams

Pos.	#	Name	Class
K	27	Joseph Petrino	Sr
LS	40	Sebastian Alonso	So
K	43	Hunter Patrick	So
LS	58	Paul Mouring	Jr
P	98	Anthony Pecorella	Jr
P	99	Colton Spangler	Jr

Head coach

- Mike Locksley

Coordinators/assistant coaches

- Dan Enos (offensive coordinator / quarterbacks coach)
- Brian Stewart (defensive coordinator / safeties coach)
- Ron Zook (Associate head coach / special teams coordinator / outside linebackers coach)
- Brian Williams (Co-Defensive Coordinator / defensive line coach)
- Elijah Brooks (running backs coach)
- Mike Miller (Tight Ends Coach / passing game coordinator)
- Brawley Evans (Inside Linebackers Coach)
- Henry Baker (Cornerbacks Coach)
- Brian Braswell (Offensive line coach)
- Zohn Burden (Wide receivers coach)
- James Thomas Jr. (Special teams quality control coach)

Legend

- (C) Team captain
- (S) Suspended
- (I) Ineligible
- Injured
- Redshirt

Roster

== Schedule ==
The 2021 schedule consisted of 7 home games, 1 neutral game, and 5 away games. Of these, the Terrapins amassed a home record of 4–3 (1–3 Big Ten), a neutral record of 1–0 (0–0 Big Ten), and an away record of 2–3 (2–3 Big Ten).

Date	Time	Opponent	Site	TV	Result	Attendance
September 4	3:30 p.m.	West Virginia*	Maryland Stadium; College Park, MD (rivalry)	ESPN	W 30–24	43,811
September 11	7:30 p.m.	Howard*	Maryland Stadium; College Park, MD	BTN	W 62–0	31,612
September 17	9:00 p.m.	at Illinois	Memorial Stadium; Champaign, IL	FS1	W 20–17	37,168
September 25	3:30 p.m.	Kent State*	Maryland Stadium; College Park, MD	BTN	W 37–16	30,117
October 1	8:00 p.m.	No. 5 Iowa	Maryland Stadium; College Park, MD	FS1	L 14–51	45,527
October 9	12:00 p.m.	at No. 7 Ohio State	Ohio Stadium; Columbus, OH	FOX	L 17–66	99,277
October 23	3:30 p.m.	at Minnesota	Huntington Bank Stadium; Minneapolis, MN	ESPN2	L 16–34	41,011
October 30	12:00 p.m.	Indiana^{†}	Maryland Stadium; College Park, MD	BTN	W 38–35	32,308
November 6	3:30 p.m.	Penn State	Maryland Stadium; College Park, MD (rivalry)	FS1	L 14–31	46,924
November 13	4:00 p.m.	at No. 7 Michigan State	Spartan Stadium; East Lansing, MI	FOX	L 21–40	67,437
November 20	3:30 p.m.	No. 6 Michigan	Maryland Stadium; College Park, MD	BTN	L 18–59	36,181
November 27	12:00 p.m.	at Rutgers	SHI Stadium; Piscataway, NJ	BTN	W 40–16	42,729
December 29	2:15 p.m.	vs. Virginia Tech*	Yankee Stadium; The Bronx, NY (Pinstripe Bowl)	ESPN	W 54–10	29,653
*Non-conference game; ^{†}Homecoming; Rankings from AP Poll (and CFP Rankings, after November 2) - Released prior to game; All times are in Eastern time

== Game summaries ==
=== Vs. West Virginia ===
West Virginia Mountaineers (0–0) vs. Maryland Terrapins (0–0)

Quarter	1	2	3	4	Total
West Virginia	14	7	0	3	24
Maryland	17	3	0	10	30

at Maryland Stadium • College Park, MD

- Date: Saturday, September 4, 2021
- Game time: 3:30 p.m. EDT
- Game weather: sunny • Temperature: 79°F
- Game attendance: 43,811
- Referee: Brandon Cruse
- TV announcers (ESPN): Anish Shroff, Mike Golic Jr., Taylor McGregor

Game information

First Quarter

- (11:46) UMD – Joseph Petrino 45 yard field goal (Drive: 9 plays, 47 yards, 3:14; UMD 3–0)
- (8:52) WVU – Leddie Brown 20 yard pass from Jarret Doege, Casey Legg kick (Drive: 7 plays, 78 yards, 2:59; WVU 7–3)
- (7:57) UMD – Dontay Demus Jr. 66 yard pass from Taulia Tagovailoa, Joseph Petrino kick (Drive: 2 plays, 80 yards, 0:50; UMD 10–7)
- (0:53) UMD – Chig Okonkwo 18 yard pass from Taulia Tagovailoa, Joseph Petrino kick (Drive: 8 plays, 70 yards, 3:03; UMD 17–7)
- (0:35) WVU – Leddie Brown 2 yard run, Casey Legg kick (Drive: 1 play, 2 yards, 0:04; UMD 17–14)

Second Quarter

- (11:30) WVU – Leddie Brown 9 yard run, Casey Legg kick (Drive: 6 plays, 74 yards, 3:00; WVU 21–17)
- (0:27) UMD – Joseph Petrino 21 yard field goal (Drive: 7 plays, 66 yards, 1:31; WVU 21–20)

Fourth Quarter

- (9:16) UMD – Joseph Petrino 26 yard field goal (Drive: 14 plays, 58 yards, 5:53; UMD 23–21)
- (6:25) UMD – Rakim Jarrett 60 yard pass from Taulia Tagovailoa, Joseph Petrino kick (Drive: 5 plays, 80 yards, 1:51; UMD 30–21)
- (2:53) WVU – Casey Legg 23 yard field goal (Drive: 14 plays, 69 yards, 3:32; UMD 30–24)

Statistics	WVU	UMD
First downs	18	22
Total yards	319	495
Rushes/yards	21/42	44/163
Passing yards	277	332
Passing: Comp–Att–Int	24–40–2	26–36–0
Time of possession	25:57	34:03

Team	Category	Player	Statistics
West Virginia	Passing	Jarret Doege	24–40, 277 yards, 1 TD, 2 INT
West Virginia	Rushing	Leddie Brown	16 carries, 69 yards, 2 TD
West Virginia	Receiving	Sam James	5 receptions, 65 yards
Maryland	Passing	Taulia Tagovailoa	26–36, 332 yards, 3 TD
Maryland	Rushing	Tayon Fleet-Davis	18 carries, 123 yards
Maryland	Receiving	Dontay Demus Jr.	6 receptions, 133 yards, 1 TD

=== Vs. Howard ===
Howard Bison (0–1) vs. Maryland Terrapins (1–0)

Quarter	1	2	3	4	Total
Howard	0	0	0	0	0
Maryland	14	24	14	10	62

at Maryland Stadium • College Park, MD

- Date: Saturday, September 11, 2021
- Game time: 7:30 p.m. EDT
- Game weather: sunny • Temperature: 67°F
- Game attendance: 31,612
- Referee: Bryan Banks
- TV: Big Ten Network

Game information

First Quarter

- (11:27) UMD – Dontay Demus Jr. 14 yard pass from Taulia Tagovailoa, Joseph Petrino kick (Drive: 6 plays, 64 yards, 2:06; UMD 7–0)
- (6:44) UMD – Tayon Fleet-Davis 17 yard run, Joseph Petrino kick (Drive: 7 plays, 54 yards, 2:30; UMD 14-0)

Second Quarter

- (14:21) UMD – Chig Okonkwo 2 yard pass from Taulia Tagovailoa, Joseph Petrino kick (Drive: 7 plays, 72 yards, 3:04; UMD 21-0)
- (8:58) UMD – Colby McDonald 11 yard run, Joseph Petrino kick (Drive: 1 plays, 11 yards, 0:05; UMD 27-0)
- (4:57) UMD – Peny Boone 4 yard run, Joseph Petrino kick (Drive: 5 plays, 45 yards, 2:11; UMD 35-0)
- (0:00) UMD – Joseph Petrino 38 yard field goal (Drive: 6 plays, 33 yards, 00:37; UMD 38-0)

Third Quarter

- (11:52) UMD – Rakim Jarrett 36 yard pass from Taulia Tagovailoa, Joseph Petrino kick (Drive: 6 plays, 66 yards, 3:02; UMD 45-0)
- (6:54) UMD – Carlos Carriere 22 yard pass from Reece Udinski, Joseph Petrino kick (Drive: 6 plays, 74 yards, 2:34; UMD 52-0)

Fourth Quarter

- (3:38) UMD – Roman Hemby 1 yard run, Harrison Beattie kick (Drive: 16 plays, 76 yards, 10:02; UMD 62-0)

Statistics	HOW	UMD
First downs	8	32
Total yards	146	574
Rushes/yards	20/66	49/227
Passing yards	80	347
Passing: Comp–Att–Int	12-31-1	27-32–0
Time of possession	22:47	37:13

Team	Category	Player	Statistics
Howard	Passing	Quinton Williams	10–27, 67 yards, 1 INT
Howard	Rushing	Robert Morgan	4 carries, 32 yards
Howard	Receiving	A'Jae Boyd	1 receptions, 32 yards
Maryland	Passing	Taulia Tagovailoa	22–27, 274 yards, 3 TD
Maryland	Rushing	Tayon Fleet-Davis	8 carries, 66 yards, 1 TD
Maryland	Receiving	Dontay Demus Jr.	6 receptions, 128 yards, 1 TD

=== At Illinois ===
Illinois Fighting Illini (1–2) vs. Maryland Terrapins (2–0)

Quarter	1	2	3	4	Total
Maryland	0	3	7	10	20
Illinois	0	3	7	7	17

at Memorial Stadium • Champaign, IL

- Date: Saturday, September 17, 2021
- Game time: 9:00 p.m. EDT
- Game weather: sunny • Temperature: 75°F
- Game attendance: 37,168
- Referee: Ron Snodgrass
- TV: FS1

Game information

Second Quarter

- (10:43) UMD – Joseph Petrino 32 yard field goal (Drive: 11 plays, 66 yards, 5:07; UMD 3-0)
- (1:27) ILL – James McCourt 25-yard field goal (Drive: 10 plays, 73 yards, 2:16; Tied 3-3)

Third Quarter

- (13:11) UMD – Tayon Fleet-Davis 2-yard run, Joseph Petrino kick (Drive: 5 plays, 75 yards, 1:49; UMD 10-3)
- (6:15) ILL – Josh McCray 38-yard run, James McCourt kick (Drive: 8 plays, 93 yards, 3:37; Tied 10-10)

Fourth Quarter

- (14:13) ILL – Casey Washington 30-yard run, James McCourt kick (Drive: 3 plays, 79 yards, 1:05; ILL 17-10)
- (13:11) UMD – Tayon Fleet-Davis 10-yard pass from Taulia Tagovailoa, Joseph Petrino kick (Drive: 8 plays, 86 yards, 2:37 Tie 17-17)
- (00:00) UMD – Joseph Petrino 32-yard field goal (Drive: 3 plays, 32 yards, 00:47; UMD 20-17)

Statistics	UMD	ILL
First downs	25	19
Total yards	481	368
Rushes/yards	27/131	45/183
Passing yards	350	185
Passing: Comp–Att–Int	32-43-0	10–26–1
Time of possession	29:09	30:51

Team	Category	Player	Statistics
Maryland	Passing	Taulia Tagovailoa	32–43, 350 yards, 1 TD
Maryland	Rushing	Tayon Fleet-Davis	11 carries, 64 yards, 1 TD
Maryland	Receiving	Dontay Demus Jr.	8 receptions, 77 yards
Illinois	Passing	Brandon Peters	10–26, 185 yards, 1 INT
Illinois	Rushing	Reggie Love III	10 carries, 63 yards
Illinois	Receiving	Chase Brown	2 receptions, 54 yards

=== Vs. Kent State ===
Kent State Golden Flashes (1–2) vs. Maryland Terrapins (3–0)

Quarter	1	2	3	4	Total
Kent State	6	3	0	7	16
Maryland	7	13	13	0	33

at Maryland Stadium • College Park, MD

- Date: Saturday, September 25, 2021
- Game time: 3:30 p.m. EDT
- Game weather: cloudy • Temperature: 74°F
- Game attendance: 30,117
- Referee: Ron Hudson
- TV: Big Ten Network

Game information

First Quarter

- (10:43) KSU – Andrew Glass 35 yard field goal (Drive: 6 plays, 22 yards, 2:25; KSU 3-0)
- (5:25) UMD – Dontay Demus Jr. 33 yard pass from Taulia Tagovailoa, Joseph Petrino kick (Drive: 3 plays, 59 yards, 1:10 UMD 7-3)
- (3:52) KSU – Andrew Glass 32 yard field goal (Drive: 6 plays, 56 yards, 1:28 UMD 7-6)

Second Quarter

- (14:55) UMD – Rakim Jarrett 6 yard pass from Taulia Tagovailoa, Joseph Petrino kick (Drive: 10 plays, 76 yards, 3:51 UMD 14-6)
- (12:03) UMD – Tayon Fleet-Davis 3 yard run, Joseph Petrino kick ('Drive: 3 plays, 74 yards, 1:19 UMD 21-6)
- (4:46) KSU – Andrew Glass 37 yard field goal (Drive: 8 plays, 60 yards, 1:56 UMD 21-9)
- (00:43) UMD – Joseph Petrino 26 yard field goal (Drive: 11 plays, 69 yards, 3:55 UMD 24-9)

Third Quarter

- (10:14) UMD – Tayon Fleet-Davis 29 yard run (Drive: 5 plays, 60 yards, 1:22 UMD 30-9)
- (5:21) UMD – Corey Dyches 9 yard pass from Taulia Tagovailoa, Joseph Petrino kick (Drive: 8 plays, 62 yards, 2:39 UMD 37-9)

Fourth Quarter

- (10:37) KSU – Dante Cephas 15 yard pass from Dustin Crum, Andrew Glass kick (Drive: 4 plays, 80 yards, 1:16 UMD 37-16)

Statistics	KSU	UMD
First downs	27	25
Total yards	458	526
Rushes/yards	47/150	28/142
Passing yards	308	384
Passing: Comp–Att–Int	19-33-0	31–41–1
Time of possession	33:59	26:01

Team	Category	Player	Statistics
Kent State	Passing	Dustin Crum	19–33, 308 yards, 1 TD
Kent State	Rushing	Marquez Cooper	13 carries, 61 yards
Kent State	Receiving	Dante Cephas	10 receptions, 151 yards, 1 TD
Maryland	Passing	Taulia Tagovailoa	31–41, 384 yards, 3 TD, 1 INT
Maryland	Rushing	Tayon Fleet-Davis	7 carries, 60 yards, 2 TD
Maryland	Receiving	Dontay Demus Jr.	4 receptions, 108 yards, 1 TD

=== Vs. No. 5 Iowa ===
Iowa Hawkeyes (4–0) vs. Maryland Terrapins (4–0)

Quarter	1	2	3	4	Total
Iowa	3	31	10	7	51
Maryland	7	0	7	0	14

at Maryland Stadium • College Park, MD

- Date: Saturday, October 1, 2021
- Game time: 8:00 p.m. EDT
- Game weather: cloudy • Temperature: 60°F
- Game attendance: 45,527
- Referee: Jerry McGinn
- TV: FS1

Game information

First Quarter

- (7:16) IOW – Caleb Shudak 41 yard field goal (Drive: 7 plays, 27 yards, 2:00 IOW 3-0)
- (3:37) UMD – Chig Okonkwo 9 yard pass from Taulia Tagovailoa, Joseph Petrino kick (Drive: 8 plays, 69 yards, 3:32 UMD 7-3)

Second Quarter

- (14:57) IOW – Spencer Petras 1 yard run, Caleb Shudak kick (Drive: 8 plays, 59 yards, 3:34 IOW 10-7)
- (14:04) IOW – Arland Bruce IV 8 yard pass from Spencer Petras, Caleb Shudak kick (Drive: 2 plays, 10 yards, 00:43 IOW 17-7)
- (10:53) IOW – Spencer Petras 1 yard run, Caleb Shudak kick (Drive: 6 plays, 26 yards, 2:57 UMD 24-7)
- (5:46) IOW – Monte Pottebaum 2 yard run, Caleb Shudak kick (Drive: 8 plays, 45 yards, 4:37 IOW 31-7)
- (00:27) IOW – Caleb Shudak 38 yard field goal (Drive: 9 plays, 46 yards, 3:50 IOW 34-7)

Third Quarter

- (12:49) IOW – Tyler Goodson 67 yard pass from Spencer Petras, Caleb Shudak kick (Drive: 4 plays, 65 yards, 2:11 IOW 41-7)
- (8:35) IOW – Caleb Shudak 32 yard field goal (Drive: 7 plays, 29 yards, 2:34 IOW 44-7)
- (6:01) UMD – Rakim Jarrett 7 yard pass from Taulia Tagovailoa, Joseph Petrino kick (Drive: 8 plays, 75 yards, 2:34 IOW 44-14)

Fourth Quarter

- (14:18) IOW – Tyrone Tracy Jr. 7 yard pass from Spencer Petras, Caleb Shudak kick (Drive: 11 plays, 82 yards, 6:39 IOW 51-14)

Statistics	IOW	UMD
First downs	25	14
Total yards	428	271
Rushes/yards	42/145	17/97
Passing yards	283	174
Passing: Comp–Att–Int	23-38-0	21–37–6
Time of possession	39:00	21:00

Team	Category	Player	Statistics
Iowa	Passing	Spencer Petras	21–30, 259 yards, 3 TD
Iowa	Rushing	Tyler Goodson	19 carries, 74 yards
Iowa	Receiving	Tyler Goodson	2 receptions, 85 yards, 1 TD
Maryland	Passing	Taulia Tagovailoa	16–29, 157 yards, 2 TD, 5 INT
Maryland	Rushing	Taulia Tagovailoa	4 carries, 25 yards
Maryland	Receiving	Dontay Demus Jr.	4 receptions, 61 yards

=== At No. 7 Ohio State ===
Maryland Terrapins (4–1) at Ohio State Buckeyes (4–1)

Quarter	1	2	3	4	Total
Maryland	3	7	7	0	17
Ohio State	14	21	21	10	66

at Ohio Stadium • Columbus, OH

- Date: Saturday, October 9, 2021
- Game time: 12:00 p.m. EDT
- Game weather: cloudy • Temperature: 73°F
- Game attendance: 99,277
- Referee: Michael Cannon
- TV: Fox

Game information

First Quarter

- (10:20) UMD – Joseph Petrino 48 yard field goal (Drive: 10 plays, 45 yards, 4:40 UMD 3-0)
- (3:37) OSU – Garrett Wilson 2 yard pass from C. J. Stroud, Noah Ruggles kick (Drive: 17 plays, 88 yards, 6:10 OSU 7-3)
- (00:17) OSU – TreVeyon Henderson 4 yard run, Noah Ruggles kick (Drive: 5 plays, 74 yards, 1:51 OSU 14-3)

Second Quarter

- (12:12) OSU – Chris Olave 36 yard pass from C. J. Stroud, Noah Ruggles kick (Drive: 3 plays, 62 yards, 1:02 OSU 21-3)
- (7:37) UMD – Carlos Carriere 7 yard pass from Taulia Tagovailoa, Joseph Petrino kick (Drive: 12 plays, 75 yards, 4:29 OSU 21-10)
- (6:54) OSU – TreVeyon Henderson 26 yard pass from C. J. Stroud, Noah Ruggles kick (Drive: 2 plays, 29 yards, 00:31 OSU 28-10)
- (00:47) OSU – Master Teague 8 yard run, Noah Ruggles kick (Drive: 8 plays, 82 yards, 1:03 OSU 35-10)

Third Quarter

- (12:26) OSU – Garrett Wilson 26 yard pass from C. J. Stroud, Noah Ruggles kick (Drive: 7 plays, 66 yards, 2:27 OSU 42-10)
- (7:47) OSU – Chris Olave 30 yard pass from C. J. Stroud, Noah Ruggles kick (Drive: 7 plays, 75 yards, 2:41 OSU 49-10)
- (2:31) OSU – TreVeyon Henderson 14 yard run, Noah Ruggles kick (Drive: 6 plays, 66 yards, 2:16 OSU 56-10)
- (00:47) UMD – Rakim Jarrett 43 yard pass from Taulia Tagovailoa, Joseph Petrino kick (Drive: 5 plays, 75 yards, 1:44 OSU 56-17)

Fourth Quarter

- (10:37) OSU – Noah Ruggles 32 yard field goal (Drive: 12 plays, 37 yards, 5:02 OSU 59-17)
- (2:58) OSU – Craig Young 70 yard interception, Dominic DiMaccio kick ( OSU 66-17)

Statistics	UMD	OSU
First downs	22	29
Total yards	335	598
Rushes/yards	36/56	33/166
Passing yards	279	432
Passing: Comp–Att–Int	28-39-2	26–38–0
Time of possession	34:44	25:16

Team	Category	Player	Statistics
Maryland	Passing	Taulia Tagovailoa	28–39, 279 yards, 2 TD, 2 INT
Maryland	Rushing	Challen Faamatau	9 carries, 71 yards
Maryland	Receiving	Chig Okonkwo	5 receptions, 56 yards
Ohio State	Passing	C. J. Stroud	24–33, 406 yards, 5 TD
Ohio State	Rushing	TreVeyon Henderson	16 carries, 103 yards 2 TD
Ohio State	Receiving	Chris Olave	7 receptions, 120 yards, 2 TD

=== At Minnesota ===
Maryland Terrapins (4–2) at Minnesota Golden Gophers (4–2)

Quarter	1	2	3	4	Total
Maryland	3	7	0	6	16
Minnesota	3	14	14	3	34

at Huntington Bank Stadium • Minneapolis, MN

- Date: Saturday, October 23, 2021
- Game time: 3:30 p.m. EDT
- Game weather: sunny • Temperature: 52°F
- Game attendance: 41,011
- Referee: Mark Kluczynski
- TV: ESPN 2

Game information

First Quarter

- (8:28) UMD – Joseph Petrino 47 yard field goal (Drive: 8 plays, 39 yards, 3:44 UMD 3-0)
- (3:41) MIN – Matthew Trickett 37 yard field goal (Drive: 10 plays, 52 yards, 4:41 Tie 3-3)

Second Quarter

- (13:48) MIN – Cole Kramer 2 yard run, Matthew Trickett kick (Drive: 7 plays, 86 yards, 3:10 MIN 10-3)
- (8:20) MIN – Ky Thomas 10 yard run, Matthew Trickett kick (Drive: 7 plays, 68 yards, 3:41 MIN 17-3)
- (4:05) UMD – Tayon Fleet-Davis 13 yard run, Joseph Petrino kick (Drive: 8 plays, 75 yards, 4:15 MIN 17-10)

Third Quarter

- (9:18) MIN – Bryce Williams 2 yard run, Matthew Trickett kick (Drive: 11 plays, 75 yards, 5:42 MIN 24-10)
- (5:31) MIN – Bucky Irving 9 yard run, Matthew Trickett kick (Drive: 4 plays, 34 yards, 1:58 MIN 31-10)

Fourth Quarter

- (8:58) MIN – Matthew Trickett 43 yard field goal (Drive: 13 plays, 55 yards, 8:42 MIN 34-10)
- (1:31) UMD – Marcus Fleming 17 yard pass from Taulia Tagovailoa (Drive: 12 plays, 91 yards, 3:25 MIN 34-16)

Statistics	UMD	MIN
First downs	14	26
Total yards	268	451
Rushes/yards	23/79	56/326
Passing yards	189	125
Passing: Comp–Att–Int	17-27-0	8–13–0
Time of possession	22:25	37:35

Team	Category	Player	Statistics
Maryland	Passing	Taulia Tagovailoa	17–27, 189 yards, 1 TD
Maryland	Rushing	Challen Faamatau	7 carries, 37 yards
Maryland	Receiving	Marcus Fleming	5 receptions, 62 yards, 1 TD
Minnesota	Passing	Tanner Morgan	8–12, 125 yards
Minnesota	Rushing	Ky Thomas	21 carries, 143 yards, 1 TD
Minnesota	Receiving	Chris Autman-Bell	4 receptions, 35 yards

=== vs Indiana ===
Indiana Hoosiers (2–5) vs. Maryland Terrapins (4–3)

Quarter	1	2	3	4	Total
Indiana	0	10	7	18	35
Maryland	14	0	14	10	38

at Maryland Stadium • College Park, MD

- Date: Saturday, October 30, 2021
- Game time: 12:00 p.m. EDT
- Game weather: cloudy • Temperature: 59°F
- Game attendance: 32,308
- Referee: Reggie Smith
- TV: Big Ten Network

Game information

First Quarter

- (11:00) UMD – Tayon Fleet-Davis 1 yard run, Joseph Petrino kick (Drive: 7 plays, 35 yards, 2:34 UMD 7-0)
- (3:55) UMD – Challen Faamatau 1 yard run, Joseph Petrino kick (Drive: 9 plays, 90 yards, 3:25 UMD 14-0)

Second Quarter

- (13:42) IND – Stephen Carr 1 yard run, Charles Campbell kick (Drive: 7 plays, 77 yards, 2:18 UMD 14-7)
- (00:08) IND – Charles Campbell 55 yard field goal (Drive: 9 plays, 35 yards, 1:51 UMD 14-10)

Third Quarter

- (11:12) IND – Stephen Carr 66 yard run, Charles Campbell kick (Drive: 5 plays, 86 yards, 1:47 IND 17-14)
- (8:34) UMD – Challen Faamatau 1 yard run, Joseph Petrino kick (Drive: 7 plays, 75 yards, 2:38 UMD 21-17)
- (4:04) UMD – Carlos Carriere 14 yard pass from Taulia Tagovailoa, Joseph Petrino kick (Drive: 8 plays, 67 yards, 2:58 UMD 28-17)

Fourth Quarter

- (14:12) IND – Charles Campbell 29 yard field goal (Drive: 11 plays, 67 yards, 4:46 UMD 28-20)
- (12:12) UMD – Carlos Carriere 45 yard pass from Taulia Tagovailoa, Joseph Petrino kick (Drive: 6 plays, 68 yards, 1:51 UMD 35-20)
- (9:28) IND – Peyton Hendershot 18 yard pass from Donaven McCulley, Peyton Hendershot pass (Drive: 6 plays, 75 yards, 2:44 UMD 35-28)
- (1:20) UMD – Joseph Petrino 41 yard field goal ('Drive: 12 plays, 36 yards, 5:16 UMD 38-20)
- (1:00) IND – Peyton Hendershot 8 yard pass from Donaven McCulley, Charles Campbell kick (Drive: 2 plays, 75 yards, 00:20 UMD 38-35)

Statistics	IND	UMD
First downs	17	30
Total yards	446	498
Rushes/yards	42/204	46/79
Passing yards	242	419
Passing: Comp–Att–Int	14-25-0	26–40–0
Time of possession	27:58	32:02

Team	Category	Player	Statistics
Indiana	Passing	Donaven McCulley	14–25, 242 yards, 2 TD
Indiana	Rushing	Stephen Carr	21 carries, 143 yards, 2 TD
Indiana	Receiving	Peyton Hendershot	6 receptions, 106 yards, 2 TD
Maryland	Passing	Taulia Tagovailoa	26–40, 419 yards, 2 TD
Maryland	Rushing	Challen Faamatau	21 carries, 52 yards, 2 TD
Maryland	Receiving	Carlos Carriere	8 receptions, 134 yards, 2 TD

=== vs No. 22 Penn State ===
Penn State Nittany Lions (5–3) vs. Maryland Terrapins (5–3)

Quarter	1	2	3	4	Total
Penn State	7	0	7	17	31
Maryland	0	6	0	8	14

at Maryland Stadium • College Park, MD

- Date: Saturday, November 6, 2021
- Game time: 3:30 p.m. EDT
- Game weather: cloudy • Temperature: 53°F
- Game attendance: 46,924
- Referee: John O'Neil
- TV announcers (FS1): Dan Hellie (play-by-play) and Petros Papadakis (analyst)

Game information

First Quarter

- (7:55) PSU – Jahan Dotson 38 yard pass from Sean Clifford, Jordan Stout kick (Drive: 4 plays, 75 yards, 1:33 PSU 7-0)

Second Quarter

- (1:15) UMD – Challen Faamatau 2 yard run (Drive: 8 plays, 86 yards, 1:41 PSU 7-6)

Third Quarter

- (6:51) PSU – Jahan Dotson 21 yard pass from Sean Clifford, Jordan Stout kick (Drive: 14 plays, 95 yards, 5:43 PSU 14-6)

Fourth Quarter

- (14:56) UMD – Corey Dyches 13 yard pass from Taulia Tagovailoa, Chiogoziem Okonkwo pass (Drive: 10 plays, 52 yards, 3:10 Tie 14-14)
- (13:55) PSU – Jahan Dotson 86 yard pass from Sean Clifford, Jordan Stout kick (Drive: 2 plays, 78 yards, 00:54 PSU 21-14)
- (6:33) PSU – Jordan Stout 24 yard field goal (Drive: 12 plays, 74 yards, 3:55 PSU 24-14)
- (2:39) PSU – Ji'Ayir Brown 87 yard interception, Jordan Stout kick

Statistics	PSU	UMD
First downs	23	29
Total yards	456	419
Rushes/yards	33/93	27/48
Passing yards	363	371
Passing: Comp–Att–Int	27-47-0	41–58–1
Time of possession	31:33	28:27

Team	Category	Player	Statistics
Penn State	Passing	Sean Clifford	27–47, 363 yards, 3 TD
Penn State	Rushing	Keyvone Lee	8 carries, 50 yards
Penn State	Receiving	Jahan Dotson	11 receptions, 242 yards, 3 TD
Maryland	Passing	Taulia Tagovailoa	41–57, 371 yards, 1 TD, 1 INT
Maryland	Rushing	Challen Faamatau	11 carries, 41 yards, 1 TD
Maryland	Receiving	Chig Okonkwo	12 receptions, 85 yards

=== At No. 8 Michigan State ===
Maryland Terrapins (5–4) at Michigan State Spartans (8–1)

Quarter	1	2	3	4	Total
Maryland	7	7	7	0	21
Michigan State	13	14	7	6	40

at Spartan Stadium • East Lansing, MI

- Date: Saturday, November 13, 2021
- Game time: 4:00 p.m. EDT
- Game weather: Cloudy • Temperature: 40°F
- Game attendance: 67,437
- Referee: Reggie Smith
- TV announcers (Fox): Joe Davis (play-by-play), Brock Huard (analyst)

Game information

First Quarter

- (13:43) MSU – Montorie Foster 52 yard pass from Payton Thorne, Matt Coghlin kick (Drive: 3 plays, 82 yards, 1:11 MSU 7-0)
- (6:51) MSU – Jayden Reed 29 yard pass from Payton Thorne (Drive: 5 plays, 86 yards, 1:59 MSU 13-0)
- (00:03) UMD – Peny Boone 4 yard run, Joseph Petrino kick (Drive: 7 plays, 76 yards, 1:52 MSU 13-7)

Second Quarter

- (8:11) MSU – Connor Heyward 2 yard pass from Payton Thorne, Matt Coghlin kick (Drive: 13 plays, 59 yards, 6:49 MSU 20-7)
- (1:42) MSU – Kenneth Walker III 1 yard run, Matt Coghlin kick (Drive: 12 plays, 6 yards, 5:44 MSU 27-7)
- (00:56) UMD – Chig Okonkwo 32 yard pass from Taulia Tagovailoa, Joseph Petrino kick (Drive: 4 plays, 80 yards, 00:46 MSU 27-14)

Third Quarter

- (9:37) MSU – Jayden Reed 3 yard pass from Payton Thorne, Matt Coghlin kick (Drive: 8 plays, 64 yards, 3:14 MSU 34-14)
- (8:33) UMD – Chig Okonkwo 32 yard pass from Taulia Tagovailoa, Joseph Petrino kick ('Drive: 3 plays, 64 yards, 00:54 MSU 34-21)

Fourth Quarter

- (10:34) MSU – Kenneth Walker III 3 yard run (Drive: 7 plays, 76 yards, 3:35 MSU 40-21)

Statistics	UMD	MSU
First downs	24	28
Total yards	451	481
Rushes/yards	25/101	44/194
Passing yards	350	287
Passing: Comp–Att–Int	29-48-1	22–30–1
Time of possession	24:10	35:50

Team	Category	Player	Statistics
Maryland	Passing	Taulia Tagovailoa	29–48, 350 yards, 2 TD, 1 INT
Maryland	Rushing	Peny Boone	5 carries, 42 yards, 1 TD
Maryland	Receiving	Chig Okonkwo	8 receptions, 112 yards, 2 TD
Michigan State	Passing	Payton Thorne	22–30, 287 yards, 4 TD, 1 INT
Michigan State	Rushing	Kenneth Walker III	30 carries, 154 yards, 2 TD
Michigan State	Receiving	Jayden Reed	8 receptions, 114 yards, 2 TD

=== vs No. 8 Michigan ===
Michigan Wolverines (9–1) at Maryland Terrapins (5–5)

Quarter	1	2	3	4	Total
Michigan	14	10	28	7	59
Maryland	0	3	15	0	18

at Maryland Stadium • College Park, MD

- Date: Saturday, November 20, 2021
- Game time: 3:30 p.m. EDT
- Game weather: cloudy • Temperature: 47°F
- Game attendance: 36,181
- Referee: Ron Snodgrass
- TV: Big Ten Network

Game information

First Quarter

- (7:09) MIC – Luke Schoonmaker 2 yard pass from Cade McNamara, Jake Moody kick (Drive: 11 plays, 70 yards, 4:25 MIC 7-0)
- (1:08) MIC – Hassan Haskins 1 yard run, Jake Moody kick (Drive: 8 plays, 45 yards, 3:06 MIC 14-0)

Second Quarter

- (9:37) UMD – Joseph Petrino 31 yard field goal (Drive: 17 plays, 69 yards, 6:27 MIC 14-3)
- (2:51) MIC – Mike Sainristil 13 yard pass from J. J. McCarthy, Jake Moody kick (Drive: 4 plays, 42 yards, 1:31 MIC 21-3)
- (00:04) MIC – Jake Moody 39 yard field goal (Drive: 12 plays, 42 yards, 1:36 MIC 24-3)

Third Quarter

- (8:50) MIC – Hassan Haskins 1 yard run, Jake Moody kick (Drive: 9 plays, 56 yards, 3:21 MIC 31-3)
- (4:51) UMD – Carlos Carriere 7 yard pass from Taulia Tagovailoa, Joseph Petrino kick (Drive: 9 plays, 74 yards, 3:51 MIC 31-10)
- (4:38) MIC – A. J. Henning 81 yard kickoff return, Jake Moody kick
- (2:22) UMD – Taulia Tagovailoa 17 yard run, Taulia Tagovailoa rush (Drive: 6 plays, 75 yards, 2:16 MIC 38-18)
- (1:33) MIC – Donovan Edwards 77 yard pass from Cade McNamara, Jake Moody kick (Drive: 3 plays, 79 yards, 00:44 MIC 45-18)
- (00:34) MIC – D. J. Turner 42 yard interception, Jake Moody kick

Fourth Quarter

- (13:40) MIC – J. J. McCarthy 5 yard run, Jake Moody kick (Drive: 2 plays, 34 yards, 00:40 MIC 59-18)

Statistics	MIC	UMD
First downs	24	20
Total yards	503	359
Rushes/yards	35/151	41/181
Passing yards	352	178
Passing: Comp–Att–Int	29-40-0	19–33–1
Time of possession	29:58	30:02

Team	Category	Player	Statistics
Michigan	Passing	Cade McNamara	21–28, 259 yards, 2 TD
Michigan	Rushing	Hassan Haskins	20 carries, 78 yards, 2 TD
Michigan	Receiving	Donovan Edwards	10 receptions, 170 yards, 1 TD
Maryland	Passing	Taulia Tagovailoa	19–33, 178 yards, 1 TD, 1 INT
Maryland	Rushing	Tayon Fleet-Davis	11 carries, 71 yards
Maryland	Receiving	Carlos Carriere	4 receptions, 53 yards, 1 TD

=== At Rutgers ===
Maryland Terrapins (5–6) at Rutgers Scarlet Knights (5–6)

Quarter	1	2	3	4	Total
Maryland	13	7	6	14	40
Rutgers	2	0	14	0	16

at SHI Stadium • Piscataway, NJ

- Date: Saturday, November 27, 2021
- Game time: 12:00 p.m. EDT
- Game weather: sunny • Temperature: 40°F
- Game attendance: 42,729
- Referee: Reggie Smith
- TV: Big Ten Network

Game information

First Quarter

- (11:42) UMD – Corey Dyches 25 yard pass from Taulia Tagovailoa, Joseph Petrino kick (Drive: 9 plays, 75 yards, 3:18 UMD 7-0)
- (6:32) UMD – Brian Cobbs 38 yard pass from Taulia Tagovailoa, (Drive: 6 plays, 85 yards, 2:56 UMD 13-0)
- (6:32) RUT – Kessawn Abraham 85 yard PAT return

Second Quarter

- (4:13) UMD – Taulia Tagovailoa 10 yard run, Joseph Petrino kick (Drive: 8 plays, 64 yards, 2:58 UMD 20-2)

Third Quarter

- (11:34) RUT – Johnny Langan 1 yard run, Valentino Ambrosio kick (Drive: 8 plays, 70 yards, 3:20 UMD 20-9)
- (8:53) UMD – Corey Dyches 11 yard pass from Taulia Tagovailoa (Drive: 6 plays, 75 yards, 2:41 UMD 26-9)
- (6:18) RUT – Aaron Young 3 yard run, Valentino Ambrosio kick (Drive: 5 plays, 37 yards, 2:26 UMD 26-16)

Fourth Quarter

- (14:51) UMD – Tayon Fleet-Davis 13 yard run, Joseph Petrino kick (Drive: 8 plays, 56 yards, 3:16 UMD 33-16)
- (6:17) UMD – Tayon Fleet-Davis 2 yard run, Joseph Petrino kick (Drive: 9 plays, 99 yards, 4:45 UMD 40-16)

Statistics	UMD	RUT
First downs	27	16
Total yards	575	337
Rushes/yards	45/263	34/164
Passing yards	312	173
Passing: Comp–Att–Int	21-30-0	16–30–1
Time of possession	27:23	26:20

Team	Category	Player	Statistics
Maryland	Passing	Taulia Tagovailoa	21–30, 312 yards, 3 TD
Maryland	Rushing	Tayon Fleet-Davis	18 carries, 156 yards, 2 TD
Maryland	Receiving	Rakim Jarrett	7 receptions, 111 yards
Rutgers	Passing	Evan Simon	7–14, 86 yards
Rutgers	Rushing	Isiah Pacheco	15 carries, 86 yards
Rutgers	Receiving	Isaiah Washington	4 receptions, 56 yards

=== Vs. Virginia Tech ===
2021 Pinstripe Bowl

Quarter	1	2	3	4	Total
Virginia Tech	0	10	0	0	10
Maryland	7	17	17	13	54

at Yankee Stadium • New York City, NY

- Date: Wednesday, December 29, 2021
- Game time: 2:15 p.m. EDT
- Game weather: cloudy • Temperature: 42°F
- Game attendance: 29,653
- Referee: Mike McCabe
- TV announcers (ESPN): Matt Barrie

Game information

First Quarter

- (12:44) UMD – Tarheeb Still 92 yard punt return, Joseph Petrino kick (Drive: 3 plays, 7 yards, 2:16; UMD 7-0)

Second Quarter

- (9:35) VT – John Parker Romo 36 yard field goal (Drive: 10 plays, 65 yards, 4:38 UMD 7-3)
- (9:13) UMD – Darryl Jones 70 yard pass from Taulia Tagovailoa, Joseph Petrino kick ('Drive: 1 play, 70 yards, 0:22 UMD 14-3)
- (6:13) UMD – Antwaine Littleton II 4 yard run, Joseph Petrino kick (Drive: 5 plays, 60 yards, 1:35 UMD 21-3)
- (01:02) VT – Connor Blumrick 3 yard run, John Parker Romo kick (Drive: 13 plays, 75 yards, 5:11 UMD 21-10)
- (00:00) UMD – Joseph Petrino 44 yard field goal (Drive: 6 plays, 60 yards, 1:02 UMD 24-10)

Third Quarter

- (10:13) UMD – Joseph Petrino 30 yard field goal (Drive: 11 plays, 63 yards, 4:47 UMD 27-10)
- (6:48) UMD – Darryl Jones 32 yard pass from Taulia Tagovailoa, Joseph Petrino kick (Drive: 6 plays, 65 yards, 2:21 UMD 34-10)
- (0:18) UMD – Roman Hemby 2 yard run, Joseph Petrino kick (Drive: 8 plays, 59 yards, 4:30 UMD 41-10)

Fourth Quarter

- (14:50) UMD – Greg Rose 11 yard fumble return, Joseph Petrino kick blocked (Drive: 2 plays, -14 yards, 0:28 UMD 47-10)
- (1:12) UMD – Colby McDonald 20 yard run, Jack Howes kick (Drive: 10 plays, 80 yards, 6:56 UMD 54-10)

Statistics	VT	UMD
First downs	14	22
Total yards	259	481
Rushes/yards	48/122	28/206
Passing yards	137	275
Passing: Comp–Att–Int	11-19-0	21–25–0
Time of possession	34:28	25:32

Team	Category	Player	Statistics
Virginia Tech	Passing	Connor Blumrick	9–15, 110 yards, 0 TD, 0 INT
Virginia Tech	Rushing	Raheem Blackshear	12 carries, 46 yards
Virginia Tech	Receiving	Nick Gallo	4 receptions, 26 yards
Maryland	Passing	Taulia Tagovailoa	20–24, 265 yards, 2 TD, 0 INT
Maryland	Rushing	Tayon Fleet-Davis	8 carries, 57 yards, 0 TD
Maryland	Receiving	Darryl Jones	4 receptions, 111 yards, 2 TD
