= 2021 Pinstripe Bowl =

Postseason college football bowl game

2021 New Era Pinstripe Bowl
- 11th Pinstripe Bowl
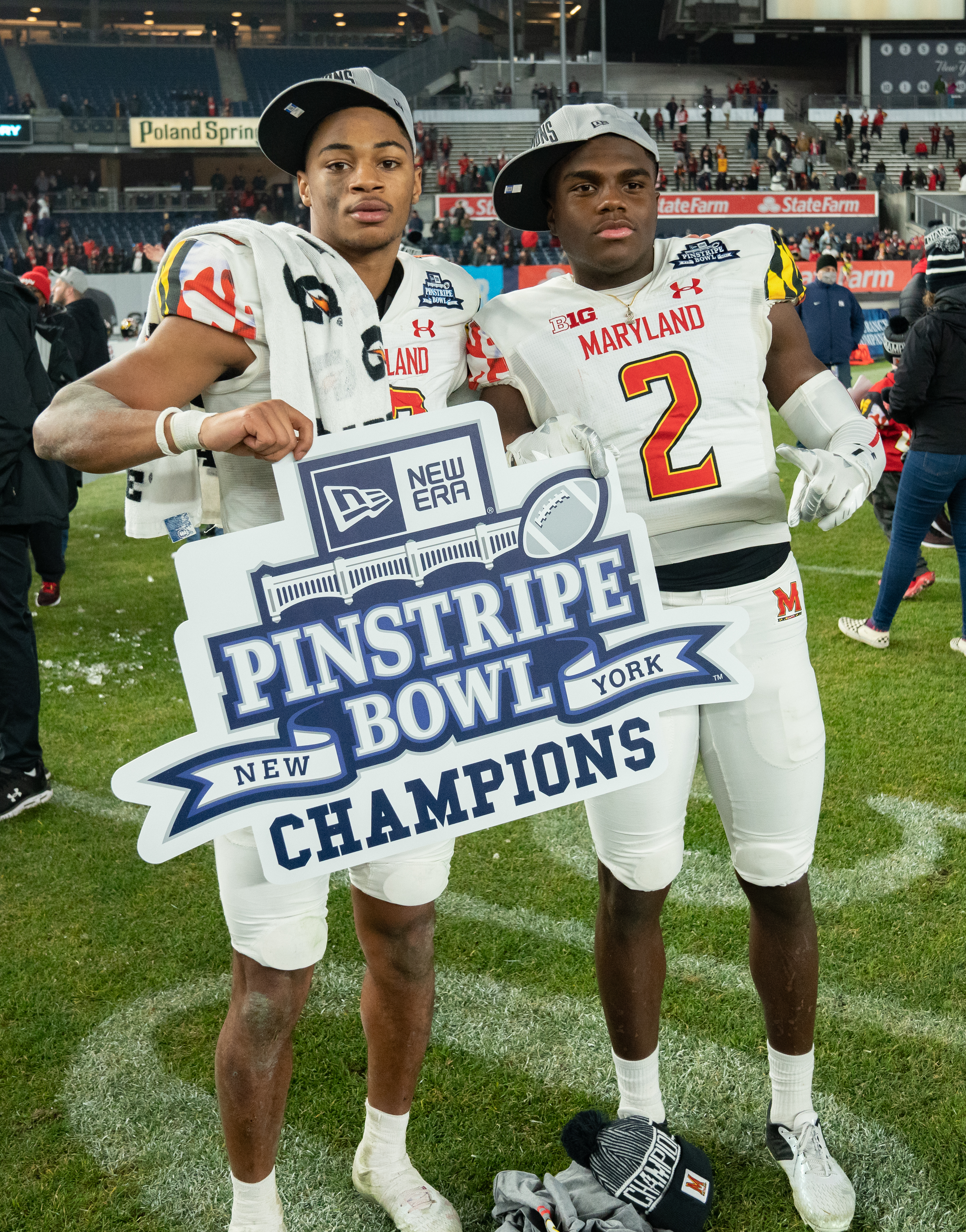
- Maryland players celebrate after the win
| Maryland Terrapins | Virginia Tech Hokies |
| (6–6) | (6–6) |
| Big Ten | ACC |
| 54 | 10 |
| Head coach: Mike Locksley | Head coach: J. C. Price (interim) |
| | 1 | 2 | 3 | 4 | Total |
|---|---|---|---|---|---|
| Maryland | 7 | 17 | 17 | 13 | 54 |
| Virginia Tech | 0 | 10 | 0 | 0 | 10 |
- Date: December 29, 2021
- Season: 2021
- Stadium: Yankee Stadium
- Location: Bronx, New York
- MVP: Taulia Tagovailoa
- Favorite: Maryland by 4.5
- Referee: Mike McCabe (Pac-12)
- Attendance: 29,653

United States TV coverage
- Network: ESPN; ESPN Radio
- Announcers: ESPN: Matt Barrie (play-by-play), Tim Hasselbeck (analyst), and Sam Acho (sideline); ESPN Radio: Chris Carlin (play-by-play), Jack Ford (analyst), and Quint Kessenich (sideline)

The 2021 Pinstripe Bowl was a college football bowl game played on December 29, 2021, with kickoff at 2:15 p.m. EST and televised on ESPN. It was the 11th edition of the Pinstripe Bowl (after the 2020 edition was cancelled due to the COVID-19 pandemic), and was one of the 2021–22 bowl games concluding the 2021 FBS football season. Sponsored by the New Era Cap Company, the game was officially known as the New Era Pinstripe Bowl. Maryland beat Virginia Tech 54-10. It was the Terrapins first bowl game victory since the 2010 Military Bowl.

== Teams ==
Consistent with conference tie-ins, the game was played between teams from the Big Ten Conference and the Atlantic Coast Conference (ACC).

This was the 32nd meeting between Maryland and Virginia Tech; entering the bowl, the Terrapins led the all-time series, 16–15. From 2004 to 2013, the Terrapins and the Hokies both competed as members of the ACC.

=== Maryland Terrapins ===
With a 30 to 24 win over rival West Virginia and a 62 to 0 win over (FCS) Howard, the Terps started their season 4-0. They then lost their next 3 games to Iowa, Ohio State, and Minnesota. Next, they had a 38 to 35 win over Indiana. Again they lost 3 games in a row to Penn State, Michigan State, and Michigan. Finally, with a 40 to 16 win over Rutgers, the Terps finished their season 6-6 and were able to play in a bowl game for the first time since 2016. On December 4, 2021, they accepted an invite to play in the New Era Pinstripe Bowl against Virginia Tech.

=== Virginia Tech Hokies ===
The Hokies started the season on a 1-0 start after upsetting the then #10 ranked North Carolina Tarheels. After successfully beating Middle Tennessee, the Hokies found themselves ranked at #15. Going into week 3 they faced rivals, West Virginia. After a devastating loss to the Mountaineers 27-21, the Hokies fell to 2-1 and out of the AP poll rankings. Virginia Tech then had a bounceback game against the Richmond Spiders (FCS). The Hokies came up on top 21-10 and with the win advanced to 3-1. Virginia Tech then ended up going on a 3 game losing streak, losing to Notre Dame, Pittsburgh, and Syracuse. They beat Georgia Tech the next week to increase their record to 4-4. The next week, They had a loss to Boston College to make them 4-5. They got their revenge when they beat Duke to become 5-5. After this, they lost to Miami to make them 5-6. Finally, a surprise win over rival Virginia clinched the Hokies a bowl bid. On December 4, 2021, they accepted an invite to play in the New Era Pinstripe Bowl against Maryland.

== Game summary ==
2021 New Era Pinstripe Bowl

| Quarter | 1 | 2 | 3 | 4 | Total |
|---|---|---|---|---|---|
| Maryland | 7 | 17 | 17 | 13 | 54 |
| Virginia Tech | 0 | 10 | 0 | 0 | 10 |

at Yankee Stadium • Bronx, New York

- Date: Wednesday, December 29, 2021
- Game time: 2:15 p.m. EST
- Game weather: Cloudy • Temperature: 42 °F (6 °C) • Wind: NE 5 mph
- Game attendance: 29,653
- Referee: Tom Smith
- TV announcers (ESPN): Matt Barrie (play-by-play), Roddy Jones (analyst), and Sam Acho (sideline)
- Box score

Scoring summary

| Quarter | Time | Drive | | | Team | Scoring information | Score | |
| Quarter | Time | Plays | Yards | TOP | Team | Scoring information | Maryland | Virginia Tech |
|---|---|---|---|---|---|---|---|---|
| 1 | 12:44 | | | | Maryland | Tarheeb Still 92-yard punt return for touchdown, Joseph Petrino kick good | 7 | 0 |
| 2 | 9:35 | 10 | 65 | 4:38 | Virginia Tech | 36-yard field goal by John Parker Romo | 7 | 3 |
| 2 | 9:13 | 1 | 70 | 0:14 | Maryland | Darryl Jones 70-yard touchdown reception from Taulia Tagovailoa, Joseph Petrino kick good | 14 | 3 |
| 2 | 6:13 | 5 | 60 | 1:35 | Maryland | Antwaine Littleton II 4-yard touchdown run, Joseph Petrino kick good | 21 | 3 |
| 2 | 1:02 | 13 | 75 | 5:11 | Virginia Tech | Connor Blumrick 3-yard touchdown run, John Parker Romo kick good | 21 | 10 |
| 2 | 0:00 | 6 | 60 | 0:59 | Maryland | 44-yard field goal by Joseph Petrino | 24 | 10 |
| 3 | 10:13 | 11 | 63 | 4:47 | Maryland | 30-yard field goal by Joseph Petrino | 27 | 10 |
| 3 | 6:48 | 6 | 65 | 2:21 | Maryland | Darryl Jones 32-yard touchdown reception from Taulia Tagovailoa, Joseph Petrino kick good | 34 | 10 |
| 3 | 0:18 | 8 | 59 | 4:30 | Maryland | Roman Hemby 2-yard touchdown run, Joseph Petrino kick good | 41 | 10 |
| 4 | 14:50 | | | | Maryland | Greg Rose 11-yard fumble return for touchdown, Joseph Petrino kick failed | 47 | 10 |
| 4 | 1:12 | 10 | 80 | 6:56 | Maryland | Colby McDonald 20-yard touchdown run, Jack Howes kick good | 54 | 10 |
| "TOP" = time of possession. For other American football terms, see Glossary of American football. | | | | | | | 54 | 10 |

== Statistics ==
=== Team statistics ===
Team statistical comparison
| Statistic | Maryland | Virginia Tech |
|---|---|---|
| First downs | 22 | 13 |
| First downs rushing | 11 | 5 |
| First downs passing | 11 | 7 |
| First downs penalty | 0 | 1 |
| Third down efficiency | 3–7 | 6–18 |
| Fourth down efficiency | 1–1 | 3–4 |
| Total plays–net yards | 53–481 | 67–259 |
| Rushing attempts–net yards | 28–206 | 48–122 |
| Yards per rush | 7.4 | 2.5 |
| Yards passing | 275 | 137 |
| Pass completions–attempts | 21–25 | 11–19 |
| Interceptions thrown | 0 | 0 |
| Punt returns–total yards | 2–94 | 1–3 |
| Kickoff returns–total yards | 2–28 | 7–171 |
| Punts–average yardage | 2–51.0 | 6–39.0 |
| Fumbles–lost | 0–0 | 2–1 |
| Penalties–yards | 3–22 | 3–25 |
| Time of possession | 25:32 | 34:28 |

=== Individual statistics ===
Maryland statistics
Terrapins passing
| | C–A | Yds | TD–INT |
|---|---|---|---|
| Taulia Tagovailoa | 20–24 | 265 | 2–0 |
| Reece Udinski | 1–1 | 10 | 0–0 |
Terrapins rushing
| | Car | Yds | TD |
| Tayon Fleet-Davis | 8 | 57 | 0 |
| Antwaine Littleton II | 7 | 45 | 1 |
| Taulia Tagovailoa | 4 | 42 | 0 |
| Colby McDonald | 4 | 36 | 1 |
| Roman Hemby | 5 | 26 | 1 |
Terrapins receiving
| | Rec | Yds | TD |
| Darryl Jones | 4 | 111 | 2 |
| Brian Cobbs | 4 | 62 | 0 |
| Rakim Jarrett | 6 | 60 | 0 |
| Chig Okonkwo | 3 | 14 | 0 |
| CJ Dippre | 1 | 10 | 0 |
| Weston Wolff | 1 | 10 | 0 |
| Corey Dyches | 1 | 7 | 0 |
| Roman Hemby | 1 | 1 | 0 |

Virginia Tech statistics
Hokies passing
| | C–A | Yds | TD–INT |
|---|---|---|---|
| Connor Blumrick | 9–15 | 110 | 0–0 |
| Tahj Bullock | 2–4 | 27 | 0–0 |
Hokies rushing
| | Car | Yds | TD |
| Raheem Blackshear | 12 | 46 | 0 |
| Jalen Holston | 6 | 23 | 0 |
| Tahj Bullock | 6 | 14 | 0 |
| Marco Lee | 2 | 12 | 0 |
| Connor Blumrick | 15 | 11 | 1 |
| Peter Moore | 1 | 8 | 0 |
| Malachi Thomas | 5 | 7 | 0 |
| Keshawn King | 1 | 1 | 0 |
Hokies receiving
| | Rec | Yds | TD |
| Jaden Payoute | 1 | 42 | 0 |
| Malachi Thomas | 1 | 34 | 0 |
| Luke Bussel | 2 | 27 | 0 |
| Nick Gallo | 4 | 26 | 0 |
| Raheem Blackshear | 2 | 5 | 0 |
| Drake DeIuliis | 1 | 3 | 0 |
