= 2021 Virginia Tech Hokies football team =

American college football season

2021 Virginia Tech Hokies football

Pinstripe Bowl, L 10–54 vs. Maryland
- Conference: Atlantic Coast Conference
- Coastal Division
- Record: 6–7 (4–4 ACC)
- Head coach: Justin Fuente (6th season; first 10 games); J. C. Price (interim)
- Offensive coordinator: Brad Cornelsen (6th season)
- Offensive scheme: Spread
- Defensive coordinator: Justin Hamilton (2nd season)
- Base defense: 4–3
- Home stadium: Lane Stadium

2021 Atlantic Coast Conference football standings
	Conf.			Overall
Team	W		L	W		L
Atlantic Division
No. 15 Wake Forest xy	7	–	1	11	–	3
No. 20 NC State	6	–	2	9	–	3
No. 14 Clemson	6	–	2	10	–	3
Louisville	4	–	4	6	–	7
Florida State	4	–	4	5	–	7
Boston College	2	–	6	6	–	6
Syracuse	2	–	6	5	–	7
Coastal Division
No. 13 Pittsburgh xy$	7	–	1	11	–	3
Miami (FL)	5	–	3	7	–	5
Virginia Tech	4	–	4	6	–	7
Virginia	4	–	4	6	–	6
North Carolina	3	–	5	6	–	7
Georgia Tech	2	–	6	3	–	9
Duke	0	–	8	3	–	9
Championship: Pittsburgh 45, Wake Forest 21
$ – Conference champion; x – Division champion/co-champions; y – Championship game participant; Rankings from AP Poll

The 2021 Virginia Tech Hokies football team represented Virginia Tech during the 2021 NCAA Division I FBS football season. The Hokies were led by sixth-year head coach Justin Fuente, prior to his departure following the Duke game. J. C. Price took over as the interim head coach for the final two games of the regular season and the bowl game. They played their home games at Lane Stadium in Blacksburg, Virginia, competing as members of the Atlantic Coast Conference (ACC). The Hokies accepted a bid to the Pinstripe Bowl to face Maryland, where they lost 54–10.

== Schedule ==
Date	Time	Opponent	Rank	Site	TV	Result	Attendance
September 3	6:00 p.m.	No. 10 North Carolina		Lane Stadium; Blacksburg, VA	ESPN	W 17–10	65,632
September 11	2:00 p.m.	Middle Tennessee*	No. 19	Lane Stadium; Blacksburg, VA	ACCNX/ESPN+	W 35–14	53,680
September 18	Noon	at West Virginia*	No. 15	Mountaineer Field; Morgantown, WV (rivalry)	FS1	L 21–27	60,222
September 25	Noon	No. 24 (FCS) Richmond*		Lane Stadium; Blacksburg, VA	ACCN	W 21–10	53,174
October 9	7:30 p.m.	No. 14 Notre Dame*		Lane Stadium; Blacksburg, VA	ACCN	L 29–32	65,632
October 16	3:30 p.m.	Pittsburgh		Lane Stadium; Blacksburg, VA	ESPN2	L 7–28	58,314
October 23	12:30 p.m.	Syracuse		Lane Stadium; Blacksburg, VA	ACCRSN	L 36–41	57,941
October 30	12:00 p.m.	at Georgia Tech		Bobby Dodd Stadium; Atlanta, GA (rivalry)	ACCRSN	W 26–17	35,543
November 5	7:30 p.m.	at Boston College		Alumni Stadium; Chestnut Hill, MA (rivalry)	ESPN2	L 3–17	35,637
November 13	3:30 p.m.	Duke		Lane Stadium; Blacksburg, VA	ACCN	W 48–17	56,730
November 20	7:30 p.m.	at Miami		Hard Rock Stadium; Miami Gardens, FL (rivalry)	ACCN	L 26–38	40,839
November 27	3:45 p.m.	at Virginia		Scott Stadium; Charlottesville, VA (Commonwealth Cup)	ACCN	W 29–24	46,445
December 29	2:15 p.m.	vs. Maryland*		Yankee Stadium; Bronx, NY (Pinstripe Bowl)	ESPN	L 10–54	29,653
*Non-conference game; Rankings from AP Poll released prior to the game; All times are in Eastern time

== Coaching staff ==
Virginia Tech Hokies coaches
Name	Title	Joined staff
Justin Fuente	Head coach (first 10 games)	2016
Brad Cornelsen	Offensive coordinator/quarterbacks coach	2016
Justin Hamilton	Defensive coordinator/safeties coach	2018
Adam Lechtenberg	Running back coach/offensive recruiting coordinator	2017
J. C. Price	Co-defensive line coach/defensive recruiting coordinator, then Interim Head Coach for the final two regular season games and bowl game	2021
James Shibest	Special teams coordinator/Tight end coach	2016
Ryan Smith	Cornerbacks coach/defensive pass game coordinator	2020
Bill Teerlinck	Defensive line coach	2020
Jack Tyler	Linebackers coach	2016
Vance Vice	Offensive line coach	2016
Jafar Williams	Wide receivers coach	2019
Jon Tenuta	Senior Defensive analyst	2021
Ben Hilgart	Strength and conditioning	2016

== Rankings ==
Ranking movements Legend: ██ Increase in ranking ██ Decrease in ranking — = Not ranked RV = Received votes
	Week															
Poll	Pre	1	2	3	4	5	6	7	8	9	10	11	12	13	14	Final
AP	—	19	15	RV	RV	RV	—	—	—	—	—	—	—	—	—	
Coaches	RV	21	15	RV	RV	RV	—	—	—	—	—	—	—	—	—	
CFP	Not released									—	—	—	—	—	—	Not released

== Game summaries ==
=== Vs. No. 10 North Carolina ===
No. 10 North Carolina Tar Heels vs. Virginia Tech Hokies

Quarter	1	2	3	4	Total
No. 10 North Carolina	0	0	7	3	10
Virginia Tech	7	7	0	3	17

at Lane Stadium • Blacksburg, VA

- Date: Friday, September 3, 2021
- Game time: 6:00 p.m. EDT
- Game weather: sunny • Temperature: 77 °F (25 °C)
- Game attendance: 65,632
- Referee: Duane Heydt
- TV announcers (ESPN): Jason Benetti, Andre Ware

Game information

First Quarter

- (10:01) VT – Braxton Burmeister 4 yd Rush (John Parker Romo Kick) (Drive: 8 plays, 75 yards, 4:59; VT 7–0)

Second Quarter

- (3:07) VT – James Mitchell 11 yd Pass From Braxton Burmeister (John Parker Romo Kick) (Drive: 12 plays, 80 yards, 7:19; VT 14–0)

Third Quarter

- (4:20) UNC – Josh Downs 37 yd Pass From Sam Howell (Grayson Atkins Kick) (Drive: 6 plays, 51 yards, 2:55; VT 14–7)

Fourth Quarter

- (14:18) VT – John Parker Romo 48 yd Field Goal (Drive: 8 plays, 45 yards, 5:02; VT 17–7)
- (5:53) UNC – Grayson Atkins 31 yd Field Goal (Drive: 9 plays, 66 yards, 3:46; VT 17–10)

Statistics	UNC	VT
First downs	18	17
Total yards	354	296
Rush yards	146	127
Passing yards	208	169
Turnovers	3	1
Time of possession	25:01	34:59

Team	Category	Player	Statistics
North Carolina	Passing	Sam Howell	17/32, 208 yards, TD
North Carolina	Rushing	Ty Chandler	10 carries, 66 yards
North Carolina	Receiving	Josh Downs	8 receptions, 123 yards
Virginia Tech	Passing	Braxton Burmeister	12/19, 169 yards, TD
Virginia Tech	Rushing	Jalen Holston	13 carries, 49 yards
Virginia Tech	Receiving	Tré Turner	4 receptions, 64 yards

=== vs Middle Tennessee ===
Middle Tennessee Blue Raiders vs. No. 19 Virginia Tech Hokies

Quarter	1	2	3	4	Total
Middle Tennessee	0	7	0	7	14
No. 19 Virginia Tech	7	7	14	7	35

at Lane Stadium • Blacksburg, VA

- Date: Saturday, September 11, 2021
- Game time: 2:05 p.m. EDT
- Game weather: Sunny • Temperature: 72 °F (22 °C)
- Game attendance: 53,680
- Referee: Mike Roche
- TV announcers (ACC Network Extra): Bill Roth, Eddie Royal

Game information

First quarter

- (0:19) VT – Tayvion Robinson 6 yd Pass From Braxton Burmeister (John Parker Romo Kick) (Drive: 14 plays 79 yards, 07:36; VT 7–0)

Second quarter

- (8:55) VT – Connor Blumrick 2 yd Rush (John Parker Romo Kick) (Drive: 9 plays 35 yards, 04:04; VT 14–0)
- (5:17) MT – CJ Windham 5 yd Pass From Bailey Hockman (Zeke Rankin Kick) (Drive: 11 plays 75 yards, 03:38; VT 14–7)

Third quarter

- (7:52) VT – Jalen Holston 29 yd Rush (John Parker Romo Kick) (Drive: 6 plays 93 yards, 02:54; VT 21–7)
- (3:16) VT – Raheem Blackshear 6 yd Rush (John Parker Romo Kick) (Drive: 5 plays 31 yards, 02:09; VT 28–7)

Fourth quarter

- (11:27) VT – Raheem Blackshear 1 yd Rush (John Parker Romo Kick) (Drive: 7 plays 70 yards, 01:46; VT 35–7)
- (0:27) MT – Marquel Tinsley 6 yd Pass From Chase Cunningham (Zeke Rankin Kick) (Drive: 13 plays 87 yards, 04:40; VT 35–14)

Statistics	MT	VT
First downs	20	23
Total yards	350	375
Rush yards	67	216
Passing yards	283	159
Turnovers	1	0
Time of possession	31:33	28:27

Team	Category	Player	Statistics
Middle Tennessee	Passing	Bailey Hockman	19/32, 207 yards, TD
Middle Tennessee	Rushing	Amir Rasul	14 carries, 39 yards
Middle Tennessee	Receiving	Jimmy Marshall	8 receptions, 111 yards
Virginia Tech	Passing	Braxton Burmeister	14/24, 142 yards, TD
Virginia Tech	Rushing	Raheem Blackshear	10 carries, 58 yards, 2 TD
Virginia Tech	Receiving	Tré Turner	4 receptions, 67 yards

=== At West Virginia ===
No. 15 Virginia Tech Hokies vs West Virginia Mountaineers

Quarter	1	2	3	4	Total
No. 15 Virginia Tech	7	0	7	7	21
West Virginia	14	10	3	0	27

at Milan Puskar Stadium • Morgantown, WV

- Date: Saturday, September 18, 2021
- Game time: 12:00 p.m. CDT
- Game weather: Sunny • Temperature: 79 °F (26 °C)
- Game attendance: 60,022
- Referee: Riley Johnson
- TV announcers (FS1): Corey Provus, Devin Gardner

Game information

First quarter

- (12:24) WVU – Leddie Brown 80 yd Rush (Casey Legg Kick) (Drive: 2 plays 80 yards, 0:18; 7–0 WVU)
- (9:11) WVU – Bryce Ford-Wheaton 29 yd Pass From Jarret Doege (Casey Legg Kick) (Drive: 3 plays 55 yards, 1:10; 14–0 WVU)
- (3:11) VT – Tayvion Robinson 23 yd Pass From Braxton Burmeister (John Parker Romo Kick) (Drive: 10 plays 75 yards, 6:00; 14–7 WVU)

Second quarter

- (7:44) WVU – Sam James 16 yd Pass From Jarret Doege (Casey Legg Kick) (Drive: 6 plays 56 yards, 1:55; 21–7 WVU)
- (1:41) WVU – Casey Legg 21 yd Field Goal (Drive: 12 plays 79 yards, 3:53; 24–7 WVU)

Third quarter

- (8:17) WVU – Casey Legg 44 yd Field Goal (Drive: 12 plays 55 yards, 6:38; 27–7 WVU)
- (0:01) VT – Raheem Blackshear 20 yd Rush (John Parker Romo Kick) (Drive: 9 plays 76 yards, 4:20; 27–14 WVU)

Fourth quarter

- (3:10) VT – Jalen Holston 29 yd Pass From Braxton Burmeister (John Parker Romo Kick) (Drive: 7 plays 47 yards, 1:38; 27–21 WVU)

Statistics	VT	WVU
First downs	19	18
Total yards	329	373
Rush yards	106	180
Passing yards	223	193
Turnovers	1	2
Time of possession	32:03	27:57

Team	Category	Player	Statistics
Virginia Tech	Passing	Braxton Burmeister	19/31, 223 yards, TD
Virginia Tech	Rushing	Raheem Blackshear	10 carries, 47 yards, TD
Virginia Tech	Receiving	Kaleb Smith	6 receptions, 58 yards
West Virginia	Passing	Jarret Doege	15/26, 193 yards, 2 TD
West Virginia	Rushing	Leddie Brown	19 carries, 161 yards, TD
West Virginia	Receiving	Isaiah Esdale	4 receptions, 46 yards

=== vs No. 24 (FCS) Richmond ===
Richmond Spiders vs. Virginia Tech Hokies

Quarter	1	2	3	4	Total
No. 24 (FCS) Richmond	0	7	3	0	10
Virginia Tech	7	7	7	0	21

at Lane Stadium • Blacksburg, VA

- Date: Saturday, September 25, 2021
- Game time: 12:00 p.m. EDT
- Game weather: Sunny • Temperature: 59 °F (15 °C)
- Game attendance: 53,174
- Referee: Jeff Heaser
- TV announcers (ACCN): Wes Durham, Roddy Jones

Game information

First quarter

- (13:10) VT – Tré Turner 10 yd Pass From Braxton Burmeister (John Parker Romo Kick) (Drive: 5 plays 65 yards, 1:50; VT 7–0)

Second quarter

- (9:22) UR – Savon Smith 16 yd Rush (Jake Larson Kick) (Drive: 1 play 16 yards, 0:05; Tied 7–7)
- (4:23) VT – Tayvion Robinson 60 yd Punt Return (John Parker Romo Kick) (Drive: Punt Return; VT 14–7)

Third quarter

- (10:02) UR – Jake Larson 38 yd Field Goal (Drive: 11 plays 54 yards, 4:58; VT 14–10)
- (5:08) VT – Connor Blumrick 1 yd Rush (John Parker Romo Kick) (Drive: 10 plays 78 yards, 4:48; VT 21–10)

Statistics	UR	VT
First downs	15	20
Total yards	237	318
Rush yards	160	106
Passing yards	77	212
Turnovers	0	1
Time of possession	32:42	26:46

Team	Category	Player	Statistics
Richmond	Passing	Beau English III	15/23, 77 yards
Richmond	Rushing	Aaron Dykes	12 carries, 58 yards
Richmond	Receiving	Jonathan Johnson	3 receptions, 27 yards
Virginia Tech	Passing	Braxton Burmeister	17/27, 212 yards, TD
Virginia Tech	Rushing	Jalen Holston	8 carries, 37 yards
Virginia Tech	Receiving	Tré Turner	6 receptions, 102 yards, TD

=== vs No. 14 Notre Dame ===
No. 14 Notre Dame Fighting Irish vs. Virginia Tech Hokies

Quarter	1	2	3	4	Total
No. 14 Notre Dame	0	14	7	11	32
Virginia Tech	7	6	9	7	29

at Lane Stadium • Blacksburg, VA

- Date: Saturday, October 9, 2021
- Game time: 7:30 p.m. CDT
- Game weather: Cloudy • Temperature: 61 °F (16 °C)
- Game attendance: 65,632
- Referee: Jerry Magallanes
- TV announcers (ACC Network): Dave O'Brien, Tim Hasselbeck

Game information

First quarter

- (3:21) VT – Raheem Blackshear 7 yd Rush (John Parker Romo Kick) (Drive: 7 plays 80 yards, 03:54; VT 7–0)

Second quarter

- (10:35) VT – John Parker Romo 19 yd Field Goal (Drive: 14 plays 59 yards, 06:17; VT 10–0)
- (6:51) ND – Tyler Buchner 3 yd Rush (Jonathan Doerer Kick) (Drive: 7 plays 75 yards, 03:44; VT 10–7)
- (0:32) ND – Kyren Williams 8 yd Pass From Tyler Buchner (Jonathan Doerer Kick) (Drive: 9 plays 80 yards, 01:03; ND 14–10)
- (0:00) VT – John Parker Romo 52 yd Field Goal (Drive: 5 plays 46 yards, 00:28; ND 14–13)

Third quarter

- (8:53) VT – John Parker Romo 26 yd Field Goal (Drive: 11 plays 61 yards, 06:01; VT 16–14)
- (4:27) ND – Kyren Williams 10 yd Rush (Jonathan Doerer Kick) (Drive: 4 plays 29 yards, 04:56; ND 21–16)
- (0:50) VT – Jermaine Waller 26 yd Interception Return (Connor Blumrick Pass Failed) (Drive: Int. Return; VT 22–21)

Fourth quarter

- (3:55) VT – Braxton Burmeister 19 yd Rush (John Parker Romo Kick) (Drive: 9 plays 56 yards, 03:44; VT 29–21)
- (2:26) ND – Avery Davis 4 yd Pass From Jack Coan (Kevin Austin Jr. Pass) (Drive: 7 plays 75 yards, 01:29; Tied 29–29)
- (0:17) ND – Jonathan Doerer 48 yd Field Goal (Drive: 7 plays 45 yards, 01:39; ND 32–29)

Statistics	ND	VT
First downs	21	21
Total yards	401	321
Rush yards	180	134
Passing yards	221	187
Turnovers	2	1
Time of possession	28:27	31:33

Team	Category	Player	Statistics
Notre Dame	Passing	Tyler Buchner	6/14, 113 yards, TD
Notre Dame	Rushing	Kyren Williams	19 carries 81 yards
Notre Dame	Receiving	Kyren Williams	5 receptions 26 yards TD
Virginia Tech	Passing	Braxton Burmeister	15/30, 184 yards
Virginia Tech	Rushing	Braxton Burmeister	10 carries 49 yards TD
Virginia Tech	Receiving	Tré Turner	6 receptions 80 yards

=== vs Pitt ===
Pitt Panthers vs. Virginia Tech Hokies

Quarter	1	2	3	4	Total
Pitt	7	14	7	0	28
Virginia Tech	0	0	7	0	7

at Lane Stadium • Blacksburg, VA

- Date: Saturday, October 16, 2021
- Game time: 3:30pm EDT
- Game weather: Cloudy • Temperature: 56 °F (13 °C)
- Game attendance: 58,314
- Referee: Stuart Mullins
- TV announcers (ESPN2): Jason Bennetti, Andre Ware

Game information

First quarter

- (7:35) PITT – Gavin Bartholomew 8 yd Pass From Kenny Pickett (Sam Scarton Kick) (Drive: 15 plays 94 yards, 5:48; PITT 7–0)

Second quarter

- (5:52) PITT – Kenny Pickett 3 yd Rush (Sam Scarton Kick) (Drive: 4 plays 29 yards, 1:31; PITT 14–0)
- (1:36) PITT – Jared Wayne 36 yd Pass From Kenny Pickett (Sam Scarton Kick) (Drive: 5 plays 81 yards, 1:36; PITT 21–0)

Third quarter

- (9:16) PITT – Vincent Davis 5 yd Rush (Sam Scarton Kick) (Drive: 10 plays 52 yards, 4:29; PITT 28–0)
- (6:33) VT – Tayvion Robinson 2 yd Pass From Braxton Burmeister (John Parker Romo Kick) (Drive: 7 plays 75 yards, 2:38; PITT 28–7)

Statistics	PITT	VT
First downs	22	13
Total yards	411	224
Rush yards	208	90
Passing yards	203	134
Turnovers	0	1
Time of possession	38:16	21:44

Team	Category	Player	Statistics
Pitt	Passing	Kenny Pickett	22/37, 203 yards, 2 TD
Pitt	Rushing	Israel Abanikanda	21 carries, 140 yards
Pitt	Receiving	Jared Wayne	6 carries, 94 yards
Virginia Tech	Passing	Braxton Burmeister	11/32, 134 yards, TD
Virginia Tech	Rushing	Malachi Thomas	6 carries, 33 yards
Virginia Tech	Receiving	Tré Turner	3 receptions, 73 yards

=== vs Syracuse ===
Syracuse Orange vs. Virginia Tech Hokies

Quarter	1	2	3	4	Total
Syracuse	7	6	7	21	41
Virginia Tech	7	12	7	10	36

at Lane Stadium • Blacksburg, VA

- Date: Saturday, October 23, 2021
- Game time: 12:30 p.m. EDT
- Game weather: Sunny • Temperature : 53 °F (12 °C)
- Game attendance: 57,941
- Referee: Riley Johnson
- TV announcers (Regional Sports Networks): Tom Werme, James Bates

Game information

First quarter

- (8:39) VT – Drake DeIuliis 22 yd Pass From Braxton Burmeister (John Parker Romo Kick) (Drive: 12 plays 75 yards, 6:21; VT 7–0)
- (4:28) SU – Sean Tucker 28 yd Rush (Andre Szmyt Kick) (Drive: 9 plays 75 yards, 4:11; Tied 7–7)

Second quarter

- (14:02) VT – Malachi Thomas 4 yd Rush (John Parker Romo Kick) (Drive: 10 plays 75 yards, 5:26; VT 14–7)
- (1:54) SU – Garrett Shrader 9 yd Rush (Drive: 11 plays 98 yards, 4:34; VT 14–13)
- (1:54) VT – Dorian Strong PAT Return (Drive: Def. 2pt Conversion; VT 16–13)
- (1:08) VT – John Parker Romo 48 yd Field Goal (Drive: 5 plays 40 yards, 0:41; VT 19–13)

Third quarter

- (11:13) SU – Garrett Shrader 21 yd Rush (Andre Szmyt Kick) (Drive: 8 carries 75 yards, 3:47; SU 20–19)
- (6:52) VT – Malachi Thomas 2 yd Rush (John Parker Romo Kick) (Drive: 5 carries 46 yards, 2:22; VT 26–20)

Fourth quarter

- (13:35) SU – Garrett Shrader 3 yd Rush (Andre Szmyt Kick) (Drive: 13 plays 66 yards, 6:00; SU 27–26)
- (10:54) VT – John Parker Romo 33 yd Field Goal (Drive: 6 plays 55 yards, 2:33; VT 29–27)
- (5:36) VT – Malachi Thomas 47 yd Rush (John Parker Romo Kick) (Drive: 5 plays 59 yards, 2:38; VT 36–27)
- (2:28) SU – Courtney Jackson 12 yd Pass From Garrett Shrader (Andre Szmyt Kick) (Drive: 7 plays 45 yards, 2:37; VT 36–34)
- (0:19) SU – Damien Alford 45 yd Pass From Garrett Shrader (Andre Szmyt Kick) (Drive: 6 plays 70 yards, 0:45; SU 41–36)

Statistics	SU	VT
First downs	25	21
Total yards	550	437
Rush yards	314	260
Passing yards	236	177
Turnovers	0	0
Time of possession	31:14	28:46

Team	Category	Player	Statistics
Syracuse	Passing	Garrett Shrader	16/34, 236 yards, 2 TD
Syracuse	Rushing	Garrett Shrader	22 carries 274 yards 3 TD
Syracuse	Receiving	Courtney Jackson	7 receptions 86 yards TD
Virginia Tech	Passing	Braxton Burmeister	10/20, 177 yards, TD
Virginia Tech	Rushing	Malachi Thomas	21 carries 151 yards 3 TD
Virginia Tech	Receiving	Tayvion Robinson	3 receptions 57 yards

=== At Georgia Tech ===
Virginia Tech Hokies vs. Georgia Tech Yellow Jackets

Quarter	1	2	3	4	Total
Virginia Tech	14	6	3	3	26
Georgia Tech	7	0	10	0	17

at Bobby Dodd Stadium • Atlanta, GA

- Date: Saturday, October 30, 2021
- Game time: 12:00pm EDT
- Game weather: Cloudy • Temperature : 56 °F (13 °C)
- Game attendance: 35,543
- Referee: Marcus Woods
- TV announcers (RSN): Tom Werme, James Bates

Game information

First quarter

- (9:51) VT – Tré Turner 69 yd Pass From Braxton Burmeister (John Parker Romo Kick) (Drive: 4 plays 86 yards, 1:17; VT 7–0)
- (6:21) GT – Kyric McGowan 26 yd Pass From Jeff Sims (Brent Cimaglia Kick) (Drive: 9 plays 75 yards, 3:30; Tied 7–7)
- (2:20) VT – Tayvion Robinson 4 yd Pass From Braxton Burmeister (John Parker Romo Kick) (Drive: 10 plays 75 yards, 4:01; VT 14–7)

Second quarter

- (4:51) VT – John Parker Romo 23 yd Field Goal (Drive: 7 plays 70 yards, 1:54; VT 17–7)
- (0:01) VT – John Parker Romo 43 yd Field Goal (Drive: 8 plays 64 yards, 1:45; VT 20–7)

Third quarter

- (10:22) GT – Brent Cimaglia 37 yd Field Goal (Drive: 9 plays 52 yards, 4:30; VT 20–10)
- (6:14) VT – John Parker Romo 34 yd Field Goal (Drive: 4 plays yards, 2:14; VT 23–10)
- (0:05) GT – Adonicas Sanders 23 yd Pass From Jeff Sims (Brent Cimaglia Kick) (Drive: 4 plays 64 yards, 1:18; VT 23–17)

Fourth quarter

- (4:21) VT – John Parker Romo 21 yd Field Goal (Drive: 12 plays 85 yards, 7:01; VT 26–17)

Statistics	VT	GT
First downs	23	16
Total yards	487	366
Rush yards	283	183
Passing yards	254	183
Turnovers	0	1
Time of possession	35:48	24:12

Team	Category	Player	Statistics
Virginia Tech	Passing	Braxton Burmeister	15/24, 254 yards, 2 TD
Virginia Tech	Rushing	Malachi Thomas	25 carries 103 yards
Virginia Tech	Receiving	Tré Turner	7 receptions 187 yards
Georgia Tech	Passing	Jeff Sims	15/26, 183 yards, 2 TD
Georgia Tech	Rushing	Jahmyr Gibbs	11 carries 113 yards
Georgia Tech	Receiving	Adonicas Sanders	4 receptions 64 yards

=== At Boston College ===
Virginia Tech Hokies vs. Boston College Eagles

Quarter	1	2	3	4	Total
Virginia Tech	0	0	3	0	3
Boston College	7	3	7	0	17

at Alumni Stadium • Chestnut Hill, MA

- Date: Friday, November 5, 2021
- Game time: 7:30pm EDT
- Game weather: Sunny • Temperature : 45 °F (7 °C)
- Game attendance: 35,637
- Referee: Duane Heydt
- TV announcers (ESPN2): Jason Bennetti, Eric MacLain

Game information

First quarter

- (3:44) BC – Phil Jurkovec 8 yd Rush (Connor Lytton Kick) (Drive: 3 plays 13 yards, 1:31; 7–0 BC)

Second quarter

- (6:48) BC – Connor Lytton 33 yd Field Goal (Drive: 16 plays, 64 yards, 8:34; 10–0 BC)

Third quarter

- (8:48) BC – Patrick Garwo 3 yd Rush (Connor Lytton Kick) (Drive: 11 plays 93 yards, 6:05; 17–0 BC)
- (5:28) VT – John Parker Romo 47 yd Field Goal (Drive: 8 plays 38 yards, 3:11; 17–3 BC)

Statistics	VT	BC
First downs	12	22
Total yards	235	346
Rush yards	162	234
Passing yards	73	112
Turnovers	1	0
Time of possession	23:04	36:56

Team	Category	Player	Statistics
Virginia Tech	Passing	Knox Kadum	7/16, 73 yards
Virginia Tech	Rushing	Malachi Thomas	13 carries 70 yards
Virginia Tech	Receiving	Tayvion Robinson	4 receptions 44 yards
Boston College	Passing	Phil Jurkovec	7/13, 112 yards
Boston College	Rushing	Patrick Garwo	30 carries 116 yards
Boston College	Receiving	Zay Flowers	3 receptions 55 yards

=== vs Duke ===
Duke Blue Devils vs. Virginia Tech Hokies

Quarter	1	2	3	4	Total
Duke	0	3	7	7	17
Virginia Tech	7	10	10	21	48

at Lane Stadium • Blacksburg, VA

- Date: Saturday, November 13, 2021
- Game time: 3:30 pm EDT
- Game weather: Sunny • Temperature : 39 °F (4 °C)
- Game attendance: 56,730
- Referee: Mike Roche
- TV announcers (ACC Network): Chris Cotter, Mark Herzlich

Game information

First quarter

- (6:38) VT – Raheem Blackshear 20 yd Rush (John Parker Romo Kick) (Drive: 5 plays 79 yards, 1:55; 7–0 VT)

Second quarter

- (12:53) VT – Keshawn King 47 yd Pass From Braxton Burmeister (John Parker Romo Kick) (Drive: 1 plays 47 yards, 0:08; 14–0 VT)
- (7:36) DUKE – Charlie Ham 27 yd Field Goal (Drive: 4 plays 3 yards, 1:20; 14–3 VT)
- (3:16) VT – John Parker Romo 51 yd Field Goal (Drive: 10 plays 57 yards, 4:14; 17–3 VT)

Third quarter

- (10:08) VT – Kaleb Smith 30 yd Pass From Braxton Burmeister (John Parker Romo Kick) (Drive: 6 plays 65 yards, 2:43; 24–3 VT)
- (5:51) VT – John Parker Romo 43 yd Field Goal (Drive: 6 plays 25 yards, 2:43; 27–3 VT)
- (2:22) DUKE – Eli Pancol 28 yd Pass From Jordan Moore (Charlie Ham Kick) (Drive: 8 plays 75 yards, 3:29; 27–10 VT)

Fourth quarter

- (11:12) VT – Raheem Blackshear 13 yd Pass From Braxton Burmeister (John Parker Romo Kick) (Drive: 3 plays 30 yards, 1:09; 34–10 VT)
- (10:19) VT – TyJuan Garbutt 16 yd Fumble Return (John Parker Romo Kick) (Drive: Fumble Recovery TD; 41–10 VT)
- (7:10) DUKE – Jordan Moore 4 yd Rush (Charlie Ham Kick) (Drive: 8 plays 77 yards, 3:05; 41–17 VT)
- (4:28) VT – Keshawn King 4 yd Rush (John Parker Romo Kick) (Drive: 5 plays 73 yards, 2:42; 48–17 VT)

Statistics	DUKE	VT
First downs	20	23
Total yards	343	573
Rush yards	196	297
Passing yards	147	276
Turnovers	1	1
Time of possession	33:20	26:40

Team	Category	Player	Statistics
Duke	Passing	Riley Leonard	7/16, 84 yards
Duke	Rushing	Jordan Moore	17 carries, 113 yards
Duke	Receiving	Jake Marwede	1 reception, 33 yards
Virginia Tech	Passing	Braxton Burmeister	9/15, 215 yards, 3 TD
Virginia Tech	Rushing	Raheem Blackshear	12 carries, 117 yards
Virginia Tech	Receiving	Tayvion Robinson	4 receptions, 78 yards

=== At Miami ===
Virginia Tech Hokies vs. Miami Hurricanes

Quarter	1	2	3	4	Total
Virginia Tech	3	10	13	0	26
Miami	14	14	3	7	38

at Hard Rock Stadium • Miami Gardens, FL

- Date: Saturday, November 20, 2021
- Game time: 7:30 pm EDT
- Game weather: Cloudy • Temperature: 77 °F (25 °C)
- Game attendance: 40,839
- Referee: Duane Heydt
- TV announcers (ACCN): Wes Durham, Roddy Jones

Game information

First quarter

- (11:26) MIA – Will Mallory 9 yd Pass From Tyler Van Dyke (Andres Borregales Kick) (Drive: 4 plays 55 yards, 1:45; 7–0 MIA)
- (5:06) VT – John Parker Romo 25 yd Field Goal (Drive: 11 plays 72 yards, 6:20; 7–3 MIA)
- (2:42) MIA – Jaylan Knighton 1 yd Rush (Andres Borregales Kick) (Drive: 8 plays 50 yards, 2:24; 14–3 MIA)

Second quarter

- (11:35) MIA – Jaylan Knighton 3 yd Rush (Andres Borregales Kick) (Drive: 7 plays 80 yards, 3:25; 21–3 MIA)
- (7:43) VT – Tré Turner 6 yd Pass From Braxton Burmeister (John Parker Romo Kick) (Drive: 11 plays 75 yards, 3:52; 21–10 MIA)
- (7:33) MIA – Brashard Smith 75 yd Pass From Tyler Van Dyke (Andres Borregales Kick) (Drive: 1 plays 75 yards, 0:10; 28–10 MIA)
- (3:33) VT – John Parker Romo 36 yd Field Goal (Drive: 9 plays 56 yards, 4:00; 28–13 MIA)

Third quarter

- (9:56) MIA – Andres Borregales 30 yd Field Goal (Drive: 4 plays 7 yards, 1:51; 31–13 MIA)
- (6:25) VT – Kaleb Smith 7 yd Pass From Connor Blumrick (John Parker Romo Kick) (Drive: 6 plays 75 yards, 3:31; 31–20 MIA)
- (2:12) VT – Da'Wain Lofton 4 yd Pass From Connor Blumrick (Drive: 7 plays 41 yards, 1:09; 31–26 MIA)

Fourth quarter

- (10:39) MIA – Mike Harley Jr. 55 yd Pass From Tyler Van Dyke (Andres Borregales Kick) (Drive: 4 plays 68 yards, 1:19; 38–26 MIA)

Statistics	VT	MIA
First downs	18	21
Total yards	375	411
Rush yards	227	54
Passing yards	148	357
Turnovers	1	0
Time of possession	33:38	26:22

Team	Category	Player	Statistics
Virginia Tech	Passing	Braxton Burmeister	14/17, 109 yards, TD
Virginia Tech	Rushing	Connor Blumrick	20 carries 132 yards
Virginia Tech	Receiving	Tré Turner	5 receptions 44 yards
Miami	Passing	Tyler Van Dyke	19/33, 357 yards, 3 TD
Miami	Rushing	Thaddius Franklin Jr.	9 carries 36 yards
Miami	Receiving	Charleston Rambo	7 receptions 116 yards

=== At Virginia ===
Virginia Tech Hokies vs. Virginia Cavaliers

Quarter	1	2	3	4	Total
Virginia Tech	7	10	7	5	29
Virginia	14	7	3	0	24

at Scott Stadium • Charlottesville, VA

- Date: Saturday, November 27, 2021
- Game time: 3:30 pm EDT
- Game weather: Sunny • Temperature: 50 °F (10 °C)
- Game attendance: 46,445
- Referee: Jeff Flanagan
- TV announcers (ACCN): Anish Schroff, Mike Golic Jr.

Game information

First quarter

- (6:20) UVA – Jelani Woods 11 yd Pass From Brennan Armstrong (Brendan Farrell Kick) (Drive: 10 plays 86 yards, 4:10; 7–0 UVA)
- (5:12) VT – Tayvion Robinson 61 yd Pass From Braxton Burmeister (John Parker Romo Kick) (Drive: 3 plays 75 yards, 1:08; Tied 7–7)
- (0:54) UVA – Brennan Armstrong 1 yd Rush (Brendan Farrell Kick) (Drive: 11 plays 75 yards, 4:18; 14–7 UVA)

Second quarter

- (6:05) VT – Raheem Blackshear 18 yd Rush (John Parker Romo Kick) (Drive: 5 plays 53 yards, 2:34; Tied 14–14)
- (3:32) UVA – Brennan Armstrong 5 yd Rush (Brendan Farrell Kick) (Drive: 6 plays 75 yards, 2:33; 21–14 UVA)
- (0:00) VT – John Parker Romo 32 yd Field Goal (Drive: 14 plays 60 yards, 3:32; 21–17 UVA)

Third quarter

- (12:30) UVA – Brendan Farrell 34 yd Field Goal (Drive: 7 plays 59 yards, 2:30; 24–17 UVA)
- (10:19) VT – Braxton Burmeister 3 yd Pass From Tayvion Robinson (John Parker Romo Kick) (Drive: 6 plays 81 yards, 2:11; Tied 24–24)

Fourth quarter

- (9:31) VT – John Parker Romo 38 yd Field Goal (Drive: 12 plays 63 yards, 7:24; 27–24 VT)
- (3:17) VT – Brennan Armstrong strip sacked, recovery by UVA in the endzone, Safety (Drive: Safety; 29–24 VT)

Statistics	VT	UVA
First downs	20	26
Total yards	464	474
Rush yards	320	55
Passing yards	114	419
Turnovers	1	2
Time of possession	31:18	28:42

Team	Category	Player	Statistics
Virginia Tech	Passing	Braxton Burmeister	6/14, 141 yards, TD
Virginia Tech	Rushing	Raheem Blackshear	18 carries 169 yards
Virginia Tech	Receiving	Tayvion Robinson	3 receptions 89 yards
Virginia	Passing	Brennan Armstrong	29/45, 405 yards, TD
Virginia	Rushing	Wayne Taulapapa	5 carries 23 yards
Virginia	Receiving	Billy Kemp IV	8 receptions 102 yards

== Players drafted into the NFL ==
Round	Pick	Player	Position	NFL club
5	177	James Mitchell	TE	Detroit Lions
6	189	Amaré Barno	LB	Carolina Panthers
6	209	Luke Tenuta	OT	Buffalo Bills
6	215	Lecitus Smith	OG	Arizona Cardinals
