= J. C. Price =

American football player and coach (born 1973)

Current position
- Title: Defensive Line Coach
- Team: East Tennessee State
- Conference: SoCon

Biographical details
- Born: January 13, 1973 (age 53); Dunkirk, Maryland, U.S.

Playing career
- 1991–1995: Virginia Tech
- 1996: Carolina Panthers
- 1996–1997: Arizona Cardinals
- Position: Defensive tackle

Coaching career (HC unless noted)
- 1997–1998: Virginia Tech (S&C)
- 1999–2001: Radford HS (VA) (DC/DL)
- 2002–2003: Virginia Tech (GA)
- 2004–2011: James Madison (DL/RGC)
- 2012: Marshall (DL)
- 2013–2017: Marshall (DT)
- 2018: Marshall (co-DC/DT)
- 2019–2020: Marshall (co-DC/DL)
- 2021: Virginia Tech (co-DL/RC)
- 2021: Virginia Tech (Interim HC)
- 2022–2025: Virginia Tech (assoc. HC/DL)
- 2026–present: East Tennessee State (DL)

Head coaching record
- Overall: 1–2

Accomplishments and honors

Awards
- Third-team All-American (1995)

Joseph Carl Price (born January 13, 1973) is an American football coach and former player. He was a third round NFL draft pick and the current co-defensive line coach at Virginia Tech. Price was promoted to interim head coach on November 16, 2021, after the firing of Justin Fuente. His team beat rival Virginia 29–24 on the road to become bowl eligible.

New permanent head coach Brent Pry retained Price as the associate head coach and defensive line coach.

Before joining Virginia Tech in 2021, he was an assistant for close to twenty years at Marshall and James Madison.

== Head coaching record ==
Year	Team	Overall	Conference	Standing	Bowl/playoffs
Virginia Tech Hokies (Atlantic Coast Conference) (2021)
2021	Virginia Tech	1–2 (Note: Price replaced Fuente with two games remaining in the regular season)	1–1	T–3rd (Coastal)	L Pinstripe
Virginia Tech:		1–2	1–1		
Total:		1–2			
