= Reece Udinski =

American football player (born 1998)

Profile
- Position: Quarterback

Personal information
- Born: August 29, 1998 (age 28); North Wales, Pennsylvania, U.S.
- Listed height: 6 ft 4 in (1.93 m)
- Listed weight: 220 lb (100 kg)

Career information
- High school: North Penn (Lansdale, Pennsylvania)
- College: VMI (2017–2020); Maryland (2021); Richmond (2022)
- NFL draft: 2023: undrafted

Career history
- Montreal Alouettes (2023)

Awards and highlights
- Dudley Award (2022); First-team All-CAA (2022); Second-team All-SoCon (2019)
- Stats at CFL.ca

Reece Udinski (born August 29, 1998) is an American former professional football quarterback. He played college football for the VMI Keydets, Maryland Terrapins, and Richmond Spiders. Udinski also played for the Montreal Alouettes of the Canadian Football League (CFL).

Udinski is VMI's single-season leader in passing yards, completions, attempts, tied first in passing touchdowns, and most 200+ yard games in a season. He is also the FCS record holder for most pass attempts before throwing an interception with 368. While at Maryland he used his redshirt year to maintain an extra year of eligibility which he used to transfer to Richmond as a graduate transfer. At Richmond where he won the 2022 Dudley Award and was named to the Walter Payton Award watchlist after he threw for a career-high 3,614 yards and 29 touchdowns.

== Early life ==
Udinski was born in North Wales, Pennsylvania, where he attended and played high school football and lacrosse for North Penn High School in Lansdale, Pennsylvania.

As a junior in 2015, he was named First Team All-League and Second Team All-Area after going 154 of 241 for 2,471 yards and twenty touchdowns. That year the team went 11–3 and made it to the quarterfinals before losing to Upper Dublin High School 21–46.

As a senior, he was named All-Area Player of the Year as he led the Knights to a 6A District 1 title and a 14–1 record, only losing to St. Joseph's Preparatory School 25–35 in the playoffs. They beat Garnet Valley High School 48–38 in the Class 6A District 1 championship. He was also named 6A First Team All-State by the Pennsylvania Football Writers Association who also named them to the All-Southeastern PA football team. He was only the second player in Pennsylvania high school football history to throw for more than 4,000 yards in a single season (now has been surpassed in 2017 by Gateway's Brady Walker), beating the previous District 1 passing yards record in a single season by over 700 yards. He threw for 41 touchdowns while completing 62 percent of his passes and averaging 274.6 passing yards per game. He set a school-record for passing yards in a game with 444 yards against Garnet Valley in the win.

== College career ==
=== VMI ===
In Udinski's true freshman season at Virginia Military Institute, he played in eight games for the Keydets. He went 51 of 94 for 432 yards which was second-best on the team. He made his college football debut in week one in a 0–62 loss against FBS opponent Air Force. He came in relief and went two of three for twelve yards and an interception. He would not record any stats in the team's losses to Catawba 20–27 and Robert Morris 0–23. He would once again come in late in their game against Chattanooga going two of three for sixteen yards. The team would lose to Nick Tiano and the Mocs 7–63. His backup role would continue as he played sparingly against Mercer 14–49, No. 20 Samford 7–26, Furman 10–42, Western Carolina 7–26, and rivals The Citadel 3–21. He would get his first real action against East Tennessee State where he came into the game early and went fourteen of 27 for 105 yards and an interception in the team's 6–24 loss. He would make his first start for VMI in the last week of the season against No. 8 Wofford. He would go 24 of 39 for 207 yards and two touchdowns, being the only quarterback to throw for a multiple-touchdown pass game that season. Despite losing 14–45 it was the most points the team had scored since week five against Mercer.

In Udinski's sophomore season, he started all eleven games. In his eleven starts he broke almost every VMI passing record as he threw for 3,082, becoming the first in school history to surpass 3,000 yards. He also broke the team's record for completions, attempts, total plays, and tied the record for touchdown passes in a season with twenty. Udinski began the season against Toledo where he went 25 of 44 for 154 yards and two interceptions before eventually being benched in favor of Austin Coulling late in the 3–66 loss. He threw his first passing touchdown of the season against No. 7 Wofford where he went 22 of 37 for 163 yards and one touchdown before being pulled late in the team's blowout 14–59 loss. He and the team would struggle once again the next week against East Tennessee State as he went 27 of sixty for 305 yards, one touchdown, and a career-high four interceptions in the team's closest loss to that point 24–27. He would bounce back against Western Carolina as he threw the ball 72 times, completing 43 of them, and tossing a school-record 491 yards alongside four touchdowns. The Keydets could not stop the Catamounts run game as they would lose a close 50–52 game which saw VMI score ten-plus points in every quarter. The team would fall all the way to 0–8 while losing to Mercer 38–48, Samford 22–73, The Citadel 32–34, and Chattanooga 27–34. Despite putting up 300+ yards passing in two games, 400+ once, and 270 once, including a five touchdown performance against The Citadel the team could not win games. After consistently throwing the ball sixty-plus times a game, the team switched to running the ball as they would get their first win of the season against Division II opponent Tusculum. Udinski would score a rushing touchdown in the 20–11 win. Following their first win they would go back to struggling, losing 13–49 to Furman and 14–77 to Old Dominion. Udinski would be benched after throwing two interceptions against the Monarchs.

In Udinski's junior season, he started all twelve games for the Keydets. He set multiple school passing records and was named to the 2019 All-SoCon Second-Team offense. He led the SoCon in passing while also breaking the school's single-season passing record of yards in a season with 3,267, and his nineteen touchdowns on the season was second all-time in a season behind his previous year's total of twenty. He also set a single season total offense record with 3,155 yards and the record for completion percentage with 63.9%. In eleven of the twelve games he threw for over 200 yards which was also a school record. The team started with a 17–56 loss to Marshall, Udinski would go twenty of 35 for 192 yards and one touchdown. The team would win back-to-back games against Mars Hill and East Tennessee State. Against Mars Hill he would throw for four touchdown passes which was a season-high. They lost two-straight against Robert Morris and Wofford. In wins against The Citadel and Samford he threw for a season-high 370 yards against Samford and 335 yards and three touchdowns against The Citadel. After losing four straight to Mercer, Western Carolina, Furman, and Army they would win the last game of the season against Chattanooga. In that game Udinski went twenty of 36 for 214 yards, and a pair of interceptions and touchdowns.

The 2020 season was moved to the spring of 2021 due to COVID-19. He entered the transfer portal on December 3, 2020, prior to the 2020–21 season but would still play and graduate from VMI. In Udinski's senior season, he started the first four games of the season. He began the year with a 14–13 win over No. 10 Furman, he threw for 248 yards and two touchdowns. He would lead the team to four-straight wins including the game against Furman. They would beat Western Carolina 30–7, Mercer 41–14, and Samford 38–37 in overtime. Against Samford after falling behind by ten going into the fourth quarter he would outscore the Bulldogs 13–3 to force overtime. Late in the game Udinski would injury his knee, which later found out was a torn ACL. The injury would end his season and his career with VMI.

=== Maryland ===
On January 24, 2021, Udinski committed to the University of Maryland, College Park, despite Tagovailoa returning as the starter. In his redshirt senior season, he would appear in five games for the Terrapins, making his FBS debut against FCS opponent Howard in week two. He completed all five of his pass attempts for 73 yards and a touchdown. He would make his next appearance in relief during the team's 14–51 loss to Iowa. He went five of eight for seventeen yards and an interception. He would throw one incompletion against Penn State before throwing one pass for ten yards in the New Era Pinstripe Bowl win over Virginia Tech. On December 30, 2021, Udinski entered the transfer portal for a second time.

=== Richmond ===
On January 3, 2022, Udinski transferred to the University of Richmond. In his graduate season, he was named to the Walter Payton Award Watch List. He made his debut for Richmond against Virginia, where he went 23 of 34 for 160 yards and a touchdown. He would lead the team to a three game win streak against Saint Francis 31–21, Lehigh 30–6, and Stony Brook 51–7. In each of those games he threw for over 200 yards and two touchdowns, with a high of 357 yards and five touchdowns against Stony Brook. The win streak came to an end in a double overtime game against No. 23 Elon, Udinski threw for a season-high 383 yards while also tallying on two touchdown passes in the 27–30 loss. He led the team to a second win streak while they beat No. 17 Villanova 20–10, Hampton 41–10, Maine 31–21, No. 17 New Hampshire 40–34, and No. 17 Delaware 21–13. The team climbed to No. 11 ranked heading into their game against William & Mary. The win streak would come to an end against the Tribe, as Udinski's 277 yards and two touchdowns were not enough, they finished the final week of the season losing 26–37. The team still earned a spot in the playoffs with a 9–2 record. The team faced PFL opponent Davidson in the first round. He went 28 of 31 for 246 yards and two touchdowns in the team's 41–0 win. The team would meet No. 2 Sacramento State in the second round. Udinski went 21 of 39 for 216 yards, three touchdowns, and an interception in the team's 31–38 loss. Heading into the fourth quarter Richmond was up by seven, but could not score or stop the Hornets as they were outscored fourteen to nothing in the final quarter.

=== VMI passing records ===
Udinski has held the following VMI passing records:

Career records:

- Most passing yards: 7,877

Season records:

- Most passing yards: 3,276 (2019)
- Most completions: 306 (2019)
- Most passing attempts: 532 (2018)
- Most plays: 570 (2018)
- Most touchdown: 20 (2018)
- Tied-most 200+ yard games: 11 (2019)
- Most passes without an interception: 368 (2019)
- Best pass completion percentage: 62.9% (2019)

Single-game records:

- Most passing yards: 491 (2018 vs. Western Carolina)
- Most passes completions: 49 (2018 vs. The Citadel)
- Most pass attempts: 72 (2018 vs. Western Carolina)

=== Richmond passing records ===
Single season records:

- Most pass attempts: 515 (2022)

Single-game records:

- Most completions: 42 (2022 vs. Elon)

=== Statistics ===
Year	Team	Games		Passing								Rushing			
Year	Team	GP	Record	Comp	Att	Pct	Yards	Avg	TD	Int	Rate	Att	Yards	Avg	TD
2017	VMI	8	0–1	51	94	54.3	432	4.6	2	4	91.4	17	−7	−0.4	0
2018	VMI	11	1–10	302	523	57.7	3,082	5.9	20	16	113.1	77	−183	−2.4	1
2019	VMI	12	5–7	306	479	63.9	3,276	6.8	19	5	132.3	54	−121	−2.2	0
2020	VMI	4	4–0	124	172	72.1	1,087	6.3	7	2	135.6	34	58	1.7	3
2021	Maryland	4	0–0	11	15	73.3	100	6.7	1	1	138.0	0	0	0.0	0
2022	Richmond	13	9–4	378	515	73.4	3,614	7.0	29	5	148.9	71	−10	−0.1	4
Career		52	19–22	1,172	1,798	65.2	11,691	6.4	78	33	103.6	253	-263	-1.0	8

== Professional career ==
Udinski participated at a rookie minicamp with the Seattle Seahawks of the National Football League in 2023 but did not make the team, later signing to practice squad of the Montreal Alouettes of the Canadian Football League on August 14, 2023.
