= Tayon Fleet-Davis =

American football player (born 1998)

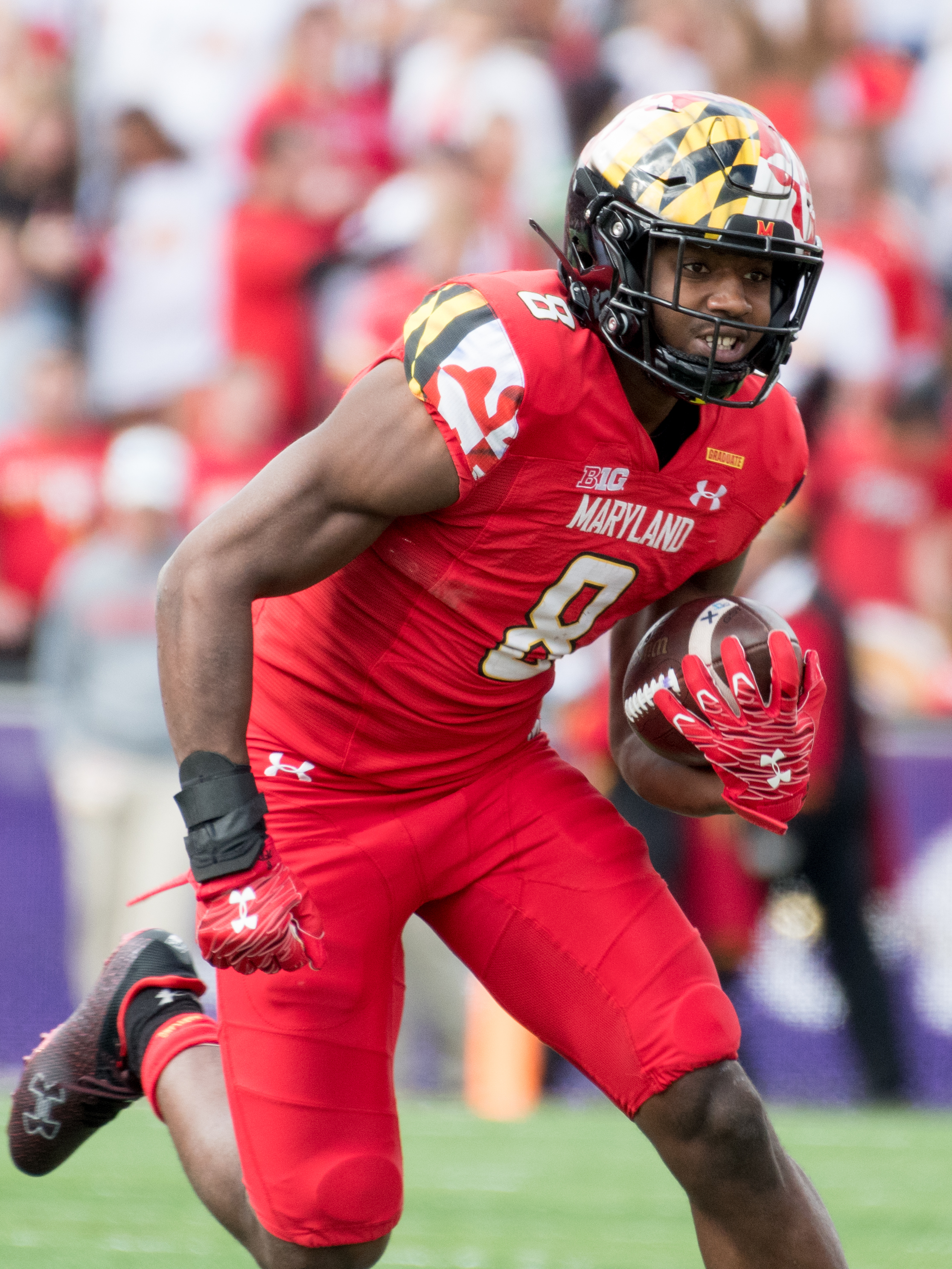
- Fleet-Davis with Maryland in 2021

Profile
- Position: Running back

Personal information
- Born: November 19, 1998 (age 27); Oxon Hill, Maryland
- Listed height: 6 ft 0 in (1.83 m)
- Listed weight: 213 lb (97 kg)

Career information
- High school: Potomac (Oxon Hill, MD)
- College: Maryland (2017–2021)
- NFL draft: 2022: undrafted

Career history
- Kansas City Chiefs (2022)*; Hamilton Tiger-Cats (2023)
- * Offseason or practice squad member only

Tayon Fleet-Davis (born November 19, 1998) is an American former football running back. He played for the Kansas City Chiefs of the National Football League (NFL), the Hamilton Tiger-Cats of the Canadian Football League (CFL), and played college football at Maryland.

== Early life ==
Tayon Fleet-Davis was born in Oxon Hill, Maryland. He was a running back for Potomac.

== College career ==
On July 30, 2016, Fleet-Davis committed to the University of Maryland and enrolled on July 1, 2017. During his career at Maryland, Fleet-Davis rushed for 1,343 yards and 15 touchdowns. During the 2021 season, Davis was named a redshirt. After the 2021 Pinstripe Bowl, Davis declared for the 2022 NFL draft.

== Professional career ==
Pre-draft measurables
Height	Weight	Arm length	Hand span	40-yard dash	10-yard split	20-yard split	20-yard shuttle	Three-cone drill	Vertical jump	Broad jump	Bench press
6 ft 0 1/8 in (1.83 m)	213 lb (97 kg)	30 3/8 in (0.77 m)	10 1/4 in (0.26 m)	4.73 s	1.60 s	2.69 s	4.38 s	7.14 s	35.0 in (0.89 m)	9 ft 11 in (3.02 m)	15 reps
All values from Pro Day

=== Kansas City Chiefs ===
After going unselected in the 2022 NFL draft, Fleet-Davis was signed by the Kansas City Chiefs as an undrafted free agent on April 30, 2022. He was waived on August 27, 2022.

=== Hamilton Tiger-Cats ===
On April 5, 2023, Fleet-Davis signed with the Hamilton Tiger-Cats of the Canadian Football League (CFL). He appeared in one game and ran for 3 yards.
