= CJ Dippre =

American football player (born 2002)

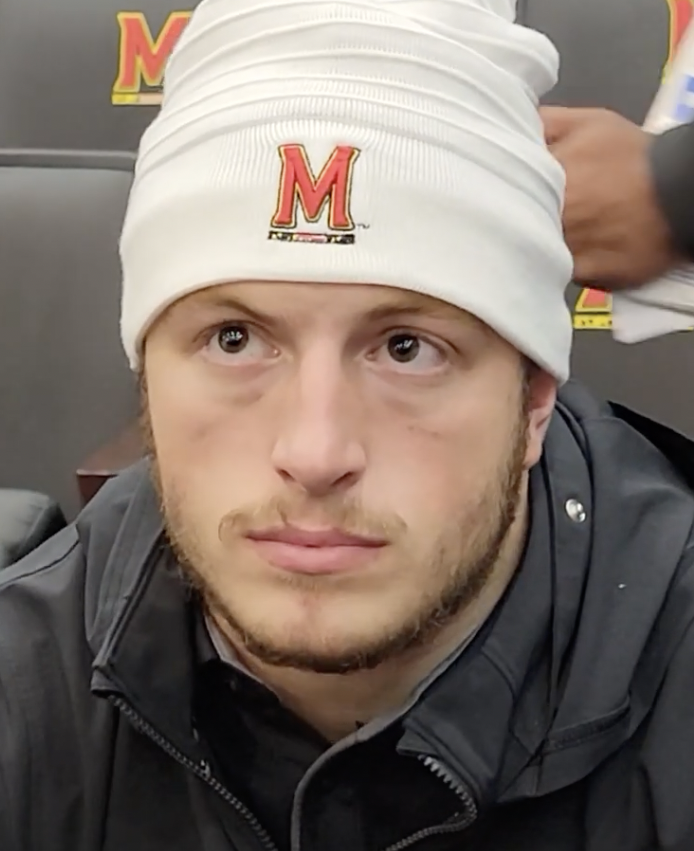
- Dippre with Maryland in 2022

No. 82 – Tampa Bay Buccaneers
- Position: Tight end
- Roster status: Practice squad

Personal information
- Born: April 29, 2002 (age 24); Scranton, Pennsylvania, U.S.
- Listed height: 6 ft 5 in (1.96 m)
- Listed weight: 256 lb (116 kg)

Career information
- High school: Lakeland (Scott, Pennsylvania)
- College: Maryland (2021–2022); Alabama (2023–2024)
- NFL draft: 2025: undrafted

Career history
- New England Patriots (2025); Tampa Bay Buccaneers (2026–present)*
- * Offseason or practice squad member only

Career NFL statistics as of 2025
- Games played: 2
- Stats at Pro Football Reference

CJ Dippre (born April 29, 2002) is an American professional football tight end for the Tampa Bay Buccaneers of the National Football League (NFL). He played college football for the Maryland Terrapins and Alabama Crimson Tide.

== Early life ==
Dippre was born and grew up in Scranton, Pennsylvania and attended Lakeland Junior/Senior High School. He played quarterback, tight end, and defensive end on the football team. As a junior, Dippre threw 19 touchdown passes, rushed for 15 touchdowns and had four touchdown receptions. He was also named All-Region and the Lackawanna Conference Defensive Player of the Year on defense after making 43 tackles with 12 tackles for loss and 5.5 sacks. Dippre was rated a three-star recruit and committed to play college football at Maryland from 17 scholarship offers. Dippre also competed in discus and placed third in the PIAA Class AA State Championship meet as a freshman and sophomore. Dippre was also a four-year letterwinner for the boys basketball team.

== College career ==
=== Maryland ===
Dippre began his college career at Maryland. He played in all 13 of the Terrapins' games during his freshman season and caught three passes for 25 yards. Dippre was Maryland's secondary tight end, behind Corey Dyches, as a sophomore and had 30 receptions for 314 yards and three touchdowns in 12 games. Dippre entered the NCAA transfer portal at the end of the regular season.

=== Alabama ===
Dippre ultimately transferred to Alabama over offers from Nebraska, Rutgers, Illinois, Syracuse, Ole Miss, NC State, West Virginia, and South Carolina.

== Professional career ==
Pre-draft measurables
Height	Weight	Arm length	Hand span	Wingspan	40-yard dash	10-yard split	20-yard split	20-yard shuttle	Three-cone drill	Vertical jump	Broad jump	Bench press
6 ft 4 7/8 in (1.95 m)	256 lb (116 kg)	32 in (0.81 m)	9 5/8 in (0.24 m)	6 ft 7 3/4 in (2.03 m)	4.69 s	1.56 s	2.77 s	4.58 s	7.27 s	34.5 in (0.88 m)	10 ft 0 in (3.05 m)	32 reps
All values from NFL Combine/Pro Day

=== New England Patriots ===
On May 9, 2025, Dippre signed with the New England Patriots as an undrafted free agent after going unselected in the 2025 NFL draft. He was waived on August 26 as part of final roster cuts. Dippre joined the practice squad the next day. He was signed to the active roster on November 17, after multiple teams tried to sign him to their 53-man rosters.

On August 30, 2026, Dippre was waived by the Patriots as a part of final roster cuts.

=== Tampa Bay Buccaneers ===
On September 2, 2026, Dippre was signed to the Tampa Bay Buccaneers' practice squad.
