= Raheem Blackshear =

American football player (born 1999)

Profile
- Position: Running back / Return specialist

Personal information
- Born: June 5, 1998 (age 28); Philadelphia, Pennsylvania, U.S.
- Listed height: 5 ft 9 in (1.75 m)
- Listed weight: 190 lb (86 kg)

Career information
- High school: Archbishop Wood (Warminster, Pennsylvania)
- College: Rutgers (2017–2019); Virginia Tech (2020–2021)
- NFL draft: 2022: undrafted

Career history
- Buffalo Bills (2022)*; Carolina Panthers (2022–2024); Tennessee Titans (2025)*; Pittsburgh Steelers (2025)*; New York Jets (2025); Columbus Aviators (2026)*; Detroit Lions (2026)*
- * Offseason or practice squad member only

Career NFL statistics
- Rushing yards: 138
- Rushing average: 3.9
- Rushing touchdowns: 3
- Receptions: 16
- Receiving yards: 138
- Return yards: 1,934
- Stats at Pro Football Reference

Raheem Blackshear (born June 5, 1998) is an American professional football running back and return specialist. He played college football for the Rutgers Scarlet Knights and Virginia Tech Hokies. He was selected by the Columbus Aviators during the 2026 UFL free agent draft.

== Professional career ==
Pre-draft measurables
Height	Weight	Arm length	Hand span	Wingspan	40-yard dash	10-yard split	20-yard split	20-yard shuttle	Three-cone drill	Vertical jump	Broad jump	Bench press
5 ft 9 3/8 in (1.76 m)	194 lb (88 kg)	30 in (0.76 m)	8 7/8 in (0.23 m)	5 ft 10 7/8 in (1.80 m)	4.53 s	1.52 s	2.53 s	4.22 s	6.84 s	33.5 in (0.85 m)	9 ft 4 in (2.84 m)	11 reps
All values from Pro Day

=== Buffalo Bills ===
Blackshear signed with the Buffalo Bills as an undrafted free agent on May 13, 2022. He was waived by on August 30, 2022, and signed to the practice squad the next day.

=== Carolina Panthers ===
On September 21, 2022, Blackshear was signed by the Carolina Panthers off the Bills practice squad. On November 6, Blackshear scored his first NFL touchdown in a game against the Cincinnati Bengals. In the 2022 season, he scored three rushing touchdowns and contributed on special teams returning kicks. In the 2023 season, he appeared in 12 games contributing on special teams with a small role on the offense.

On April 1, 2025, Blackshear re-signed with the Panthers to a one-year contract. He was waived on August 26 with an injury settlement as part of final roster cuts.

=== Tennessee Titans ===
On September 23, 2025, Blackshear was signed to the Tennessee Titans practice squad. He was released by the Titans on September 29.

=== Pittsburgh Steelers ===
On October 7, 2025, Blackshear signed with the Pittsburgh Steelers' practice squad. He was released by the Steelers on October 28.

=== New York Jets ===
On December 30, 2025, Blackshear was signed to the New York Jets practice squad.

=== Columbus Aviators ===
On January 14, 2026, Blackshear was selected by the Columbus Aviators of the United Football League (UFL). He was released on February 5.

=== Detroit Lions ===
On August 4, 2026, Blackshear was signed by the Detroit Lions. He was placed on injured reserve on August 25, and released the next day.

== NFL career statistics ==
=== Regular season ===
Year	Team	Games		Rushing					Receiving					Kickoff return					Fumbles	
Year	Team	GP	GS	Att	Yds	Avg	Lng	TD	Rec	Yds	Avg	Lng	TD	Ret	Yds	Avg	Lng	TD	Fum	Lost
2022	CAR	13	1	23	77	3.3	16	3	10	93	9.3	27	0	19	513	27.0	66	0	1	1
2023	CAR	9	0	13	40	3.1	9	0	6	45	7.5	19	0	16	430	26.9	52	0	0	0
2024	CAR	16	1	15	80	5.3	27	0	0	0	0	0	0	31	791	25.5	43	0	0	0
Career		38	2	52	203	3.9	27	3	16	138	8.6	27	0	66	1734	26.3	66	0	1	1
