= 2021 Ohio State Buckeyes football team =

American college football season

2021 Ohio State Buckeyes football

Big Ten East Division co-champion Rose Bowl champion

Rose Bowl, W 48–45 vs. Utah
- Conference: Big Ten Conference
- East Division

Ranking
- Coaches: No. 5
- AP: No. 6
- Record: 11–2 (8–1 Big Ten)
- Head coach: Ryan Day (3rd season)
- Offensive coordinator: Kevin Wilson (5th season)
- Offensive scheme: West Coast spread
- Defensive coordinator: Kerry Coombs (2nd season)
- Base defense: 4–2–5
- Captains: Kamryn Babb; Haskell Garrett; Zach Harrison; Teradja Mitchell; Thayer Munford; Chris Olave
- Home stadium: Ohio Stadium

2021 Big Ten Conference football standings
	Conf.			Overall
Team	W		L	W		L
East Division
No. 3 Michigan xy$^	8	–	1	12	–	2
No. 6 Ohio State x	8	–	1	11	–	2
No. 9 Michigan State	7	–	2	11	–	2
Penn State	4	–	5	7	–	6
Maryland	3	–	6	7	–	6
Rutgers	2	–	7	5	–	8
Indiana	0	–	9	2	–	10
West Division
No. 23 Iowa xy	7	–	2	10	–	4
Minnesota	6	–	3	9	–	4
Wisconsin	6	–	3	9	–	4
Purdue	6	–	3	9	–	4
Illinois	4	–	5	5	–	7
Nebraska	1	–	8	3	–	9
Northwestern	1	–	8	3	–	9
Championship: Michigan 42, Iowa 3
^ – College Football Playoff participant; $ – Conference champion; x – Division champion/co-champions; y – Championship game participant; Rankings from AP Poll

The 2021 Ohio State Buckeyes football team represented Ohio State University in the 2021 NCAA Division I FBS football season. They were led by third-year head coach Ryan Day, and played their home games at Ohio Stadium in Columbus, Ohio. It was the Buckeyes' 132nd season overall and 109th as a member of the Big Ten Conference.

This was the first time since 2018 that Ohio State did not reach the College Football Playoff after two losing games against Oregon and Michigan and the first time since 2016 that Ohio State did not reach the Big Ten Championship Game.

The Buckeyes were invited to compete at the Rose Bowl, where they defeated Utah by a score of 48–45.

== Offseason ==
=== Players lost ===
- LB Tuf Borland
- LB Baron Browning
- P Drue Chrisman
- DE Jonathon Cooper
- G Wyatt Davis – Declared for NFL Draft
- TE Luke Farrell
- QB Justin Fields – Declared for NFL Draft
- K Blake Haubeil
- TE Jake Hausmann
- LB Justin Hilliard
- C Josh Myers – Declared for NFL Draft
- RB Trey Sermon
- DT Tommy Togiai – Declared for NFL Draft
- CB Shaun Wade
- LB Pete Werner

== Schedule ==
Date	Time	Opponent	Rank	Site	TV	Result	Attendance
September 2	8:00 p.m.	at Minnesota	No. 4	Huntington Bank Stadium; Minneapolis, MN (Big Noon Kickoff)	FOX	W 45–31	50,805
September 11	12:00 p.m.	No. 12 Oregon*	No. 3	Ohio Stadium; Columbus, OH (Big Noon Kickoff)	FOX	L 28–35	100,482
September 18	3:30 p.m.	Tulsa*	No. 9	Ohio Stadium; Columbus, OH	FS1	W 41–20	76,540
September 25	7:30 p.m.	Akron*	No. 10	Ohio Stadium; Columbus, OH	BTN	W 59–7	95,178
October 2	3:30 p.m.	at Rutgers	No. 11	SHI Stadium; Piscataway, NJ	BTN	W 52–13	51,006
October 9	12:00 p.m.	Maryland^{†}	No. 9	Ohio Stadium; Columbus, OH	FOX	W 66–17	99,277
October 23	7:30 p.m.	at Indiana	No. 6	Memorial Stadium; Bloomington, IN	ABC	W 54–7	52,656
October 30	7:30 p.m.	No. 20 Penn State	No. 4	Ohio Stadium; Columbus, OH (rivalry)	ABC	W 33–24	102,951
November 6	12:00 p.m.	at Nebraska	No. 3	Memorial Stadium; Lincoln, NE	FOX	W 26–17	85,458
November 13	3:30 p.m.	No. 19 Purdue	No. 4	Ohio Stadium; Columbus, OH	ABC	W 59–31	101,009
November 20	12:00 p.m.	No. 7 Michigan State	No. 4	Ohio Stadium; Columbus, OH (College GameDay)	ABC	W 56–7	101,858
November 27	12:00 p.m.	at No. 5 Michigan	No. 2	Michigan Stadium; Ann Arbor, MI (rivalry, Big Noon Kickoff, College GameDay)	FOX	L 27–42	111,156
January 1, 2022	5:00 p.m.	vs. No. 12 Utah*	No. 6	Rose Bowl, College GameDay; Pasadena, CA (Rose Bowl)	ESPN	W 48–45	87,842
*Non-conference game; ^{†}Homecoming; Rankings from AP Poll (and CFP Rankings, after November 2) – Released prior to game; All times are in Eastern time

== Personnel ==
=== Roster ===
2021 Ohio State Buckeyes football team roster
Players
Coaches
Offense

Pos.	#	Name	Class
WR	2	Chris Olave (C)	Sr
QB	3	Quinn Ewers	Fr
WR	4	Julian Fleming	So
WR	5	Garrett Wilson	Jr
QB	6	Kyle McCord	Fr
QB	7	C. J. Stroud	So
WR	8	Kamryn Babb (injured) (C)	Jr
QB	9	Jack Miller III	So
WR	10	Jayden Ballard	Fr
WR	11	Jaxon Smith-Njigba	So
WR	12	Emeka Egbuka	Fr
TE	13	Gee Scott Jr.	So
TE	16	Cade Stover	So
QB	18	J. P. Andrade	Jr
WR	18	Marvin Harrison Jr.	Fr
QB	19	Jagger LaRoe	Sr
RB	21	Evan Pryor	Fr
RB	24	Marcus Crowley	So
WR	25	Xavier Johnson	Jr
RB	26	Cayden Saunders	Fr
RB	28	Miyan Williams	So
RB	32	TreVeyon Henderson	Fr
RB	33	Master Teague	Jr
TE	34	Mitch Rossi	Sr
RB	43	Robert Cope	Sr
TE	49	Patrick Gurd	So
OL	53	Luke Wypler	So
OL	54	Toby Wilson	Fr
OL	55	Matthew Jones	Jr
OL	59	Zach Stevenson	Jr
OL	60	Ryan Smith	Jr
OL	61	Jack Forsman	Fr
OL	64	Jack Jamieson	Sr
OL	65	Zen Michalski	Fr
OL	66	Enokk Vimahi	So
OL	67	Jakob James	So
OL	69	Trey Leroux	So
OL	70	Josh Fryar	So
OL	71	Ben Christman	Fr
OL	73	Grant Toutant	So
OL	74	Donovan Jackson	Fr
OL	75	Thayer Munford (C)	Sr
OL	76	Harry Miller	Jr
OL	77	Paris Johnson Jr.	So
OT	78	Nicholas Petit-Frere	Jr
OL	79	Dawand Jones	Jr
TE	80	Corey Rau	GS
TE	81	Sam Hart	Fr
WR	82	Sam Wiglusz	Sr
WR	83	Joop Mitchell	Fr
TE	84	Joe Royer	So
WR	85	Austin Kutscher	Sr
WR	86	Chris Booker	Sr
WR	87	Reis Stocksdale	Fr
TE	88	Jeremy Ruckert	Sr
TE	89	Zak Herbstreit	Fr

Defense

Pos.	#	Name	Class
CB	1	Demario McCall	Sr
S	2	Kourt Williams II	So
LB	3	Teradja Mitchell (C)	Sr
CB	4	Lejond Cavazos	So
CB	5	Marcus Williamson	GS
DT	6	Taron Vincent	Jr
CB	7	Sevyn Banks	Sr
DE	8	Javontae Jean-Baptiste	Jr
DE	9	Zach Harrison (C)	Jr
S	10	Cameron Martinez	So
DE	11	Tyreke Smith	Sr
S	12	Lathan Ransom	So
CB	13	Jordan Hancock	Fr
S	14	Ronnie Hickman	So
S	15	Craig Young	So
CB	16	Ryan Watts	So
S	17	Bryson Shaw	So
LB	19	Dallas Gant	Sr
LB	20	Mitchell Melton (injured)	So
LB	21	Palaie Gaoteote IV	Sr
LB	22	Steele Chambers	So
S	23	Marcus Hooker	Jr
S	24	Jantzen Dunn	Fr
S	25	Jaylen Johnson (injured)	Fr
CB	26	Cameron Brown	Jr
LB	28	Reid Carrico	Fr
CB	29	Denzel Burke	Fr
LB	30	Cody Simon	So
CB	32	Jakailin Johnson	Fr
DE	33	Jack Sawyer	Fr
S	34	Andre Turrentine	Fr
LB	35	Tommy Eichenberg	So
DB	38	Cameron Kittle	So
DB	39	Andrew Moore	Fr
S	41	Josh Proctor (injured)	Sr
CB	42	Lloyd McFarquhar	Sr
LB	43	Ryan Batsch	Sr
DE	44	JT Tuimoloau	Fr
LB	46	Cade Kacherski	Sr
LB	50	Jackson Kuwatch	Fr
DT	51	Mike Hall Jr.	Fr
DT	52	Antwuan Jackson	GS
DE	54	Tyler Friday (injured)	Sr
DE	56	Aaron Cox	Sr
LB	57	Jalen Pace	Fr
DT	58	Ty Hamilton	So
DL	59	Darrion Henry-Young	So
DL	62	Bryce Prater	Fr
DL	63	Zach Prater	Fr
DL	83	Cormontae Hamilton	So
DT	86	Jerron Cage	Sr
DT	90	Jaden McKenzie	So
DT	91	Tyleik Williams	Fr
DT	92	Haskell Garrett (C)	GS
DL	93	Jacolbe Cowan	So
DL	97	Noah Potter	So

Special teams

Pos.	#	Name	Class
K	20	Dominic DiMaccio	Sr
P	29	Jesse Mirco	Fr
K	37	Garrison Smith	Fr
LS	42	Bradley Robinson	Sr
LS	48	Max Lomonico	Fr
LS	94	Mason Arnold	Fr
K	95	Noah Ruggles	GS
P	96	Michael O'Shaughnessy	Jr
K	98	Jake Seibert	So

Head coach

- Ryan Day

Coordinators/assistant coaches

- Larry Johnson (associate head coach / defensive line)
- Kerry Coombs (defensive coordinator)
- Kevin Wilson (offensive coordinator / tight ends)
- Al Washington (linebackers)
- Tony Alford (assistant head coach for offense / running backs)
- Brian Hartline (wide receivers)
- Greg Studrawa (offensive line)
- Matt Barnes (secondary)
- Corey Dennis (quarterbacks)
- Parker Fleming (special teams coordinator)
- Paul Rhoads (defensive analyst)
- Todd Fitch (offensive analyst)
- Mickey Marotti (assistant athletic director / director of football)
- Gene Smith (vice-president / athletic director)
- Billy Fessler (graduate assistant – offense)

Legend

- (C) Team captain
- (S) Suspended
- (I) Ineligible
- Injured
- Redshirt

Roster

=== Depth chart ===
Defense

B
14 Ronnie Hickman
2 Kourt Williams II
⋅

FS
17 Bryson Shaw
10 Cameron Martinez
⋅

WLB	SLB
3 Teradja Mitchell	35 Tommy Eichenberg
22 Steele Chambers	30 Cody Simon
⋅	⋅

CS
5 Marcus Williamson
12 Lathan Ransom
⋅

CB
26 Cameron Brown
7 Sevyn Banks
⋅

DE	DT	DT	DE
9 Zach Harrison	52 Antwuan Jackson	92 Haskell Garrett	8 Javontae Jean-Baptiste
11 Tyreke Smith	86 Jerron Cage	6 Taron Vincent	44 JT Tuimoloau
⋅	⋅	⋅	⋅

CB
29 Denzel Burke
1 Demario McCall
⋅

Offense

WR
2 Chris Olave
12 Emeka Egbuka
⋅

WR
11 Jaxon Smith-Njigba
18 Marvin Harrison Jr.
⋅

LT	LG	C	RG	RT
78 Nicholas Petit-Frere	75 Thayer Munford	53 Luke Wypler	77 Paris Johnson Jr.	79 Dawand Jones
66 Enokk Vimahi	55 Matthew Jones	76 Harry Miller	74 Donovan Jackson	70 Josh Fryar
⋅	⋅	⋅	⋅	⋅

TE
88 Jeremy Ruckert
16 Cade Stover
⋅

WR
5 Garrett Wilson
4 Julian Fleming
⋅

QB
7 C. J. Stroud
6 Kyle McCord
9 Jack Miller III

Key reserves

Special teams
PK 95 Noah Ruggles
PK 20 Dominic DiMaccio
P 29 Jesse Mirco
P 96 Michael O'Shaughnessy
KR 12 Emeka Egbuka
PR 5 Garrett Wilson
LS 42 Bradley Robinson
H 29 Jesse Mirco

RB
32 TreVeyon Henderson
33 Master Teague
28 Miyan Williams

As of January 1, 2022. Depth chart

== Game summaries ==
=== at Minnesota ===
No. 4 Ohio State Buckeyes (0–0) at Minnesota Golden Gophers (0–0) – Game summary

Quarter	1	2	3	4	Total
No. 4 Buckeyes	7	3	21	14	45
Golden Gophers	0	14	7	10	31

at Huntington Bank Stadium • Minneapolis, Minnesota

- Date: September 2
- Game time: 8:00 p.m. EDT
- Game weather: Rain • Temperature: 68 °F (20 °C) • Wind: – at 8 miles per hour (13 km/h)
- Game attendance: 50,805
- Referee: Reggie Smith
- TV announcers (FOX): Gus Johnson (play-by-play), Joel Klatt (analyst), and Jenny Taft (sideline reporter)
- Box score, Recap

Game information

First quarter

- (7:22) OSU – Miyan Williams 71-yard run, Noah Ruggles kick (Drive: 5 plays, 92 yards, 1:42; Ohio State 7–0)

Second quarter

- (12:50) OSU – Noah Ruggles 35-yard field goal (Drive: 14 plays, 74 yards, 6:47; Ohio State 10–0)
- (9:11) MINN – Dylan Wright 13-yard pass from Tanner Morgan, Matthew Trickett kick (Drive: 6 plays, 80 yards, 3:39; Ohio State 10–7)
- (3:32) MINN – Mohamed Ibrahim 1-yard run, Matthew Trickett kick (Drive: 8 plays, 37 yards, 4:31; Minnesota 14–10)

Third quarter

- (12:43) OSU – Chris Olave 38-yard pass from C. J. Stroud, Noah Ruggles kick (Drive: 7 plays, 81 yards, 2:17; Ohio State 17–14)
- (10:03) MINN – Mohamed Ibrahim 19-yard run, Matthew Trickett kick (Drive: 5 plays, 75 yards, 2:40; Minnesota 21–17)
- (5:12) OSU – Garrett Wilson 56-yard pass from C. J. Stroud, Noah Ruggles kick (Drive: 1 play, 56 yards, 0:08; Ohio State 24–21)
- (2:18) OSU – Haskell Garrett 32-yard fumble return, Noah Ruggles kick (Ohio State 31–21)

Fourth quarter

- (10:39) MINN – Matthew Trickett 46-yard field goal (Drive: 12 plays, 47 yards, 6:39; Ohio State 31–28)
- (9:43) OSU – TreVeyon Henderson 70-yard pass from C. J. Stroud, Noah Ruggles kick (Drive: 3 plays, 75 yards, 0:56; Ohio State 38–28)
- (5:31) MINN – Bryce Williams 2-yard run, Matthew Trickett kick (Drive: 9 plays, 75 yards, 4:12; Ohio State 38–31)
- (4:39) OSU – Chris Olave 61-yard pass from C. J. Stroud, Noah Ruggles kick (Drive: 2 plays, 75 yards, 0:52; Ohio State 45–31)

No. 4 Ohio State opened the season at Huntington Bank Stadium, where they faced the Minnesota Golden Gophers. This was the 51st meeting between the teams, with Ohio State having a winning record against the Golden Gophers at 44–7–0. The Buckeyes had won ten straight entering the game, which was their second longest current Big Ten winning streak. The teams last met in 2018, with the Buckeyes winning 30–14 at Ohio Stadium.

Ohio State took an early lead on 71-yard touchdown run by Miyan Williams and a 35-yard field goal. Leading 10–0, Minnesota scored two consecutive touchdowns in the second quarter to take a 14–10 lead at the half. The teams traded touchdowns to start the third quarter. C. J. Stroud then hit Garrett Wilson on a 56-yard touchdown pass to give the Buckeyes a 24–21 lead. On the ensuing possession, Haskell Garrett recovered a strip sack and returned the fumble 32 yards for a touchdown and pushing the Buckeye lead to 31–21. Following a Minnesota field goal, Stroud hit TreVeyon Henderson on a 70-yard pass and run to extend OSU's lead to 14. Minnesota narrowed the lead to seven again with just over five minutes remaining, but Stroud hit Chris Olave for a 61-yard touchdown, Olave's second in the game and Stroud's fourth touchdown pass. The 45–31 win moved OSU to 1–0 in conference on the season.

Williams ran for 127 yards on nine carries while Stroud completed 13 of 22 pass for 294 yards and four touchdowns. OSU's defense, though scoring a touchdown, surrendered 203 yards rushing and 205 yards passing to Minnesota in the win.

Statistics	OSU	MINN
First downs	17	24
Plays–yards	48–495	75–408
Rushes–yards	26–201	50–203
Passing yards	294	205
Passing: comp–att–int	13–22–1	14–25–0
Time of possession	21:19	38:41

Team	Category	Player	Statistics
Ohio State	Passing	C. J. Stroud	13/22, 294 yards, 4 TD, 1 INT
Ohio State	Rushing	Miyan Williams	9 carries, 125 yards, 1 TD
Ohio State	Receiving	Chris Olave	4 receptions, 117 yards, 2 TD
Minnesota	Passing	Tanner Morgan	14/25, 205 yards, 1 TD
Minnesota	Rushing	Mohamed Ibrahim	30 carries, 163 yards, 2 TD
Minnesota	Receiving	Daniel Jackson	3 receptions, 58 yards

=== vs No. 12 Oregon ===
No. 12 Oregon Ducks (1–0) vs No. 3 Ohio State Buckeyes (1–0) – Game summary

Quarter	1	2	3	4	Total
No. 12 Ducks	0	14	14	7	35
No. 3 Buckeyes	0	7	7	14	28

at Ohio Stadium • Columbus, Ohio

- Date: September 11
- Game time: 12:00 p.m.
- Game weather: Partly cloudy • Temperature: 74 °F (23 °C) • Wind: – at 9 miles per hour (14 km/h)
- Game attendance: 100,482
- Referee: Steven Strimling
- TV announcers (FOX): Gus Johnson (play-by-play), Joel Klatt (analyst), and Jenny Taft (sideline reporter)
- Box score, Recap

Game information

First quarter

- No scoring plays

Second quarter

- (14:27) ORE – CJ Verdell 14-yard run, Camden Lewis kick (Drive: 10 plays, 99 yards, 3:57; Oregon 7–0)
- (8:42) OSU – Garrett Wilson 27-yard pass from C. J. Stroud, Noah Ruggles kick (Drive: 5 plays, 70 yards, 1:47; Tied 7–7)
- (4:51) ORE – CJ Verdell 14-yard pass from Anthony Brown, Camden Lewis kick (Drive: 7 plays, 65 yards, 3:51; Oregon 14–7)

Third quarter

- (13:38) ORE – CJ Verdell 77-yard run, Camden Lewis kick (Drive: 3 plays, 84 yards, 1:22; Oregon 21–7)
- (10:25) OSU – Jaxon Smith-Njigba 26-yard pass from C. J. Stroud, Noah Ruggles kick (Drive: 7 plays, 75 yards, 3:13; Oregon 21–14)
- (7:38) ORE – Travis Dye 5-yard run, Camden Lewis kick (Drive: 7 plays, 75 yards, 2:47; Oregon 28–14)

Fourth quarter

- (12:54) OSU – TreVeyon Henderson 2-yard run, Noah Ruggles kick (Drive: 8 plays, 73 yards, 2:08; Oregon 28–21)
- (10:10) ORE – Moliki Matavao 14-yard pass from Anthony Brown, Camden Lewis kick (Drive: 6 plays, 74 yards, 2:44; Oregon 35–21)
- (7:55) OSU – Jaxon Smith-Njigba 15-yard pass from C. J. Stroud, Noah Ruggles kick (Drive: 8 plays, 75 yards, 2:15; Oregon 35–28)

The No. 12 Oregon Ducks defeated the No. 3 Ohio State Buckeyes 35–28 in a rematch of the 2015 College Football Playoff National Championship. Ohio State, who is now 9–1 in the series, was favored by 14.

This was the first Buckeye game in Ohio Stadium open to the general public since November 23, 2019. Big Noon Kickoff was filmed on location for the game.

Statistics	ORE	OSU
First downs	27	32
Plays–yards	73–505	86–612
Rushes–yards	38–269	31–128
Passing yards	236	484
Passing: comp–att–int	17–35–0	35–54–1
Time of possession	29:46	30:14

Team	Category	Player	Statistics
Oregon	Passing	Anthony Brown	16/34, 225 yards, 2 TD
Oregon	Rushing	CJ Verdell	17 carries, 151 yards, 2 TD
Oregon	Receiving	CJ Verdell	3 receptions, 34 yards, 1 TD
Ohio State	Passing	C. J. Stroud	34/53, 472 yards, 3 TD, 1 INT
Ohio State	Rushing	Miyan Williams	14 carries, 77 yards
Ohio State	Receiving	Chris Olave	12 receptions, 126 yards

=== vs Tulsa ===
Tulsa vs No. 9 Ohio State

Team	1	2	3	4	Total
Tulsa	3	3	7	7	20
• No. 9 Ohio State	3	10	14	14	41

- Date: September 18, 2021
- Location:
  Ohio Stadium
  Columbus, OH
- Game start: 3:30 p.m. EDT
- Elapsed time: 4:01
- Game attendance: 76,540
- Game weather: 88 °F (31 °C); Sunny
- Referee: John O'Neill
- TV announcers (FS1): Tim Brando (play-by-play) and Spencer Tillman (analyst)

Statistics	Tulsa	Ohio State
First downs	25	24
Plays–yards	82–501	66–508
Rushes–yards	28–73	41–323
Passing yards	428	185
Passing: comp–att–int	31–54–2	15–25–1
Turnovers		
Time of possession	31:34	28:26

Team	Category	Player	Statistics
Tulsa	Passing	Davis Brin	31–54, 428 yds, 2 TD, 2 INT
Tulsa	Rushing	Deneric Prince	9 att, 38 yds
Tulsa	Receiving	Josh Johnson	8 rec, 149 yds, 1 TD
Ohio State	Passing	C. J. Stroud	15–25, 185 yds 1 TD, 1 INT
Ohio State	Rushing	TreVeyon Henderson	24 att, 277 yds, 3 TD
Ohio State	Receiving	Garrett Wilson	6 rec, 70 yds, 1 TD

Scoring summary

Quarter	Time	Drive			Team	Scoring information	Score	
Quarter	Time	Plays	Yards	TOP	Team	Scoring information	Tulsa	Ohio State
1	5:40	16	81	6:30	TLSA	22-yard field goal by Zack Long	3	0
1	0:57	12	47	4:43	OSU	43-yard field goal by Noah Ruggles	3	3
2	10:47	14	62	5:10	TLSA	31-yard field goal by Zack Long	6	3
2	8:44	6	64	2:03	OSU	TreVeyon Henderson 5-yard touchdown run, Noah Ruggles kick good	6	10
2	0:47	9	53	2:44	OSU	44-yard field goal by Noah Ruggles	6	13
3	12:12	5	72	1:46	OSU	TreVeyon Henderson 48-yard touchdown run, Noah Ruggles kick good	6	20
3	1:00	5	48	1:36	TLSA	Cannon Montgomery 21-yard touchdown reception from Davis Brin, Zack long kick good	13	20
3	0:00	3	72	0:59	OSU	TreVeyon Henderson 52-yard touchdown run, Noah Ruggles kick good	13	27
4	12:07	6	75	2:53	TLSA	Josh Johnson 22-yard touchdown reception from Davis Brin, Zack Long kick good	20	27
4	3:07	7	65	3:42	OSU	Garrett Wilson 12-yard touchdown reception from C. J. Stroud, Noah Ruggles kick good	20	34
4	1:50	4	18	1:17	OSU	Interception returned 61 yards for touchdown by Cameron Martinez, Noah Ruggles kick good	20	41
"TOP" = time of possession. For other American football terms, see Glossary of American football.							20	41

=== vs Akron ===
Akron vs No. 10 Ohio State

Team	1	2	3	4	Total
Akron	7	0	0	0	7
• No. 10 Ohio State	14	24	14	7	59

- Date: September 25, 2021
- Location:
  Ohio Stadium
  Columbus, OH
- Game start: 7:40 p.m. EDT
- Elapsed time: 03:21
- Game attendance: 95,178
- Game weather: 64 °F (18 °C); Cloudy;
- Referee: Larry Smith
- TV announcers (BTN): Brandon Gaudin (play-by-play), James Laurinaitis (analyst) and Rick Pizzo (sideline)

Statistics	Akron	Ohio State
First downs	17	26
Plays–yards	74–229	61–622
Rushes–yards	40–76	35–237
Passing yards	153	385
Passing: comp–att–int	18–34–2	18–26–1
Turnovers		
Time of possession	36:40	23:20

Team	Category	Player	Statistics
Akron	Passing	DJ Irons	14–29, 115 yds, 1 TD, 2 INT
Akron	Rushing	Blake Hester	12 att, 47 yds
Akron	Receiving	Konata Mumpfield	7 rec., 67 yds, 1 TD
Ohio State	Passing	Kyle McCord	13–18, 319 yds, 2 TD, 1 INT
Ohio State	Rushing	TreVeyon Henderson	8 att, 93 yds, 2 TD
Ohio State	Receiving	Garrett Wilson	4 rec, 124 yds

Scoring summary

Quarter	Time	Drive			Team	Scoring information	Score	
Quarter	Time	Plays	Yards	TOP	Team	Scoring information	Akron	Ohio State
1	07:27	9	55	4:40	AKR	Konata Mumpfield 4-yard touchdown reception from DJ Irons, Cory Smigel kick good	7	0
1	05:27	6	75	2:00	OSU	Chris Olave 5-yard touchdown reception from Kyle McCord, Noah Ruggles kick good	7	7
1	00:11	3	73	0:57	OSU	TreVeyon Henderson 3-yard touchdown run, Noah Ruggles kick good	7	14
2	10:23	10	70	4:22	OSU	Jaxon Smith-Njigba 34-yard touchdown reception from Kyle McCord, Noah Ruggles kick good	7	21
2	07:16	3	40	1:01	OSU	TreVeyon Henderson 14-yard touchdown run, Noah Ruggles kick good	7	28
2	04:43	5	17	2:33	OSU	Interception returned 46 yards for touchdown by Ronnie Hickman, Noah Ruggles kick good	7	35
2	00:02	2	39	0:12	OSU	32-yard field goal by Noah Ruggles	7	38
3	10:56	2	87	0:36	OSU	Master Teague 2-yard touchdown run, Noah Ruggles kick good	7	45
3	04:14	8	85	2:47	OSU	Master Teague 15-yard touchdown run, Noah Ruggles kick good	7	52
4	02:47	10	75	4:12	OSU	Evan Pryor 12-yard touchdown run, Dominic DiMaccio kick good	7	59
"TOP" = time of possession. For other American football terms, see Glossary of American football.							7	59

=== At Rutgers ===
No. 11 Ohio State vs Rutgers

Team	1	2	3	4	Total
• No. 11 Ohio State	24	21	7	0	52
Rutgers	6	0	0	7	13

- Date: October 2, 2021
- Location:
  SHI Stadium
  Piscataway, NJ
- Game start: 3:42 p.m. EDT
- Elapsed time: 03:25
- Game attendance: 51,006
- Game weather: 76 °F (24 °C); Sunny;
- Referee: Jeffrey Servinski
- TV announcers (BTN): Brandon Gaudin (play-by-play); James Laurinaitis (analyst); Rick Pizzo (reporter)

Statistics	Ohio State	Rutgers
First downs	25	18
Plays–yards	64–541	71–346
Rushes–yards	37–208	31–111
Passing yards	333	235
Passing: comp–att–int	18–27–0	28–40–3
Turnovers		
Time of possession	30:32	29:28

Team	Category	Player	Statistics
Ohio State	Passing	C. J. Stroud	17–23, 330 yds, 5 TD
Ohio State	Rushing	TreVeyon Henderson	8 att, 71 yds, 1 TD
Ohio State	Receiving	Chris Olave	5 rec, 119 yds, 2 TD
Rutgers	Passing	Noah Vedral	16–26, 152 yds, 1 TD, 3 INT
Rutgers	Rushing	Jamier Wright–Collins	4 att, 39 yds
Rutgers	Receiving	Aron Cruickshank	3 rec, 102 yds, 1 TD

Scoring summary

Quarter	Time	Drive			Team	Scoring information	Score	
Quarter	Time	Plays	Yards	TOP	Team	Scoring information	Ohio State	Rutgers
1	12:13	2	48	0:32	OSU	TreVeyon Henderson 44-yard touchdown run, Noah Ruggles kick good	7	0
1	11:33	2	23	0:33	OSU	Interception returned 23 yards for touchdown by Denzel Burke, Noah Ruggles kick good	14	0
1	05:45	10	64	4:43	OSU	23-yard field goal by Noah Ruggles	17	0
1	02:34	5	74	1:49	OSU	Garrett Wilson 32-yard touchdown reception from C. J. Stroud, Noah Ruggles kick good	24	0
1	02:23	1	75	0:11	RUT	Aron Cruickshank 75-yard touchdown reception from Noah Vedral, Valentino Ambrosio kick no good (blocked)	24	6
2	12:31	9	75	4:52	OSU	Mitch Rossi 1-yard touchdown reception from C. J. Stroud, Noah Ruggles kick good	31	6
2	06:27	5	50	2:23	OSU	Jeremy Ruckert 19-yard touchdown reception from C. J. Stroud, Noah Ruggles kick good	38	6
2	03:24	5	68	1:27	OSU	Chris Olave 56-yard touchdown reception from C. J. Stroud, Noah Ruggles kick good	45	6
3	10:21	10	75	4:39	OSU	Chris Olave 11-yard touchdown reception from C. J. Stroud, Noah Ruggles kick good	52	6
4	07:40	11	70	5:07	RUT	Joshua Youngblood 12-yard touchdown reception from Cole Snyder, Valentino Ambrosio kick good	52	13
"TOP" = time of possession. For other American football terms, see Glossary of American football.							52	13

=== vs Maryland ===
Maryland vs No. 7 Ohio State

Team	1	2	3	4	Total
Maryland	3	7	7	0	17
• No. 7 Ohio State	14	21	21	10	66

- Date: October 9, 2021
- Location:
  Ohio Stadium
  Columbus, OH
- Game start: 12:05 p.m. EDT
- Elapsed time: 3:29
- Game attendance: 99,277
- Game weather: 73 °F (23 °C); Overcast
- Referee: Michael Cannon
- TV announcers (FOX): Aaron Goldsmith (play-by-play), Brock Huard (analyst) and Bruce Feldman (sideline)

Statistics	Maryland	Ohio State
First downs	22	29
Plays–yards	75–335	71–598
Rushes–yards	36–56	33–166
Passing yards	279	432
Passing: comp–att–int	28–39–2	24–33–0
Turnovers		
Time of possession	34:44	25:16

Team	Category	Player	Statistics
Maryland	Passing	Taulia Tagovailoa	28–39, 279 yds, 2 TD, 2 INT
Maryland	Rushing	Challen Faamatau	9 att, 71 yds, 0 TD
Maryland	Receiving	Chig Okonkwo	5 rec, 56 yds, 0 TD
Ohio State	Passing	C. J. Stroud	24–33, 406 yds, 5 TD, 0 INT
Ohio State	Rushing	TreVeyon Henderson	16 att, 102 yds, 2 TD
Ohio State	Receiving	Chris Olave	7 rec, 120 yds, 2 TD

Scoring summary

Quarter	Time	Drive			Team	Scoring information	Score	
Quarter	Time	Plays	Yards	TOP	Team	Scoring information	Maryland	Ohio State
1	10:20	10	45	4:40	UMD	48-yard field goal by Joseph Petrino	3	0
1	04:03	17	88	6:10	OSU	Garrett Wilson 2-yard touchdown reception from C. J. Stroud, Noah Ruggles kick good	3	7
1	0:17	74	5	1:51	OSU	TreVeyon Henderson 4-yard touchdown run, Noah Ruggles kick good	3	14
2	12:12	3	62	1:02	OSU	Chris Olave 36-yard touchdown reception from C. J. Stroud, Noah Ruggles kick good	3	21
2	07:37	12	75	4:29	UMD	Carlos Carriere 7-yard touchdown reception from Taulia Tagovailoa, Joseph Petrino kick good	10	21
2	06:54	2	29	0:31	OSU	TreVeyon Henderson 26-yard touchdown reception from C. J. Stroud, Noah Ruggles kick good	10	28
2	0:47	8	82	1:03	OSU	Master Teague 8-yard touchdown run, Noah Ruggles kick good	10	35
3	12:26	7	66	2:27	OSU	Garrett Wilson 26-yard touchdown reception from C.J. Stroud, Noah Ruggles kick good	10	42
3	7:47	7	75	2:41	OSU	Chris Olave 30-yard touchdown reception from C.J. Stroud, Noah Ruggles kick good	10	49
3	2:31	6	66	2:16	OSU	TreVeyon Henderson 14-yard touchdown run, Noah Ruggles kick good	10	56
3	0:47	5	75	1:44	UMD	Rakim Jarrett 43-yard touchdown reception from Taulia Tagovailoa, Joseph Petrino kick good	17	56
4	10:37	12	37	5:02	OSU	32-yard field goal by Noah Ruggles	17	59
4	2:58	1	70	2:34	OSU	Interception returned 70 yards for touchdown by Craig Young, Noah Ruggles kick good	17	66
"TOP" = time of possession. For other American football terms, see Glossary of American football.							17	66

=== At Indiana ===
No. 5 Ohio State at Indiana

Team	1	2	3	4	Total
• No. 5 Ohio State	14	30	7	3	54
Indiana	7	0	0	0	7

- Date: October 23, 2021
- Location:
  Memorial Stadium
  Bloomington, IN
- Game start: 7:44 p.m. EDT
- Elapsed time: 3:08
- Game attendance: 52,656
- Game weather: 58 °F (14 °C); Rain; Wind: NE 3 mph
- Referee: Larry Smith
- TV announcers (ABC): Dave Pasch (play-by-play), Dusty Dvoracek (analyst), Tom Luginbill (sideline)

Statistics	Ohio State	Indiana
First downs	30	10
Plays–yards	62–539	54–128
Rushes–yards	32–187	37–48
Passing yards	352	80
Passing: comp–att–int	28–37–0	8–17–0
Turnovers		
Time of possession	32:01	27:59

Team	Category	Player	Statistics
Ohio State	Passing	C. J. Stroud	21–28, 266 yds, 4 TD, 0 INT
Ohio State	Rushing	TreVeyon Henderson	9 att, 81 yds, 2 TD
Ohio State	Receiving	Jaxon Smith-Njigba	6 att, 99 yds, 0 TD
Indiana	Passing	Jack Tuttle	4–7, 41 yds, 1 TD, 0 INT
Indiana	Rushing	Trent Howland	5 att, 17 yds, 0 TD
Indiana	Receiving	Peyton Hendershot	5 rec, 35 yds, 1 TD

Scoring summary

Quarter	Time	Drive			Team	Scoring information	Score	
Quarter	Time	Plays	Yards	TOP	Team	Scoring information	Ohio State	Indiana
1	9:50	12	75	5:10	OSU	Miyan Williams 11-yard touchdown run, Noah Ruggles kick Good	7	0
1	2:58	15	75	6:52	IND	Peyton Hendershot 7-yard touchdown reception from Jack Tuttle, Charles Campbell kick good	7	7
1	1:25	5	75	1:33	OSU	TreVeyon Henderson 21-yard touchdown run, Noah Ruggles kick good	14	7
2	12:47	6	51	2:43	OSU	TreVeyon Henderson 14-yard touchdown run, Noah Ruggles kick good	21	7
2	10:11	4	-8	2:31	OSU	Indiana tackled in end zone for a safety by OSU	23	7
2	8:24	5	39	1:35	OSU	Chris Olave 16-yard touchdown reception from C. J. Stroud, Noah Ruggles kick good	30	7
2	5:45	2	30	0:29	OSU	TreVeyon Henderson 6-yard touchdown run, Noah Ruggles kick good	37	7
2	0:31	8	66	2:56	OSU	Jeremey Ruckert 14-yard touchdown reception from C. J. Stroud, Noah Ruggles kick good	44	7
3	1:15	10	78	5:04	OSU	Jeremey Ruckert 2-yard touchdown reception from C. J. Stroud, Noah Ruggles kick good	51	7
4	8:49	11	67	5:53	OSU	26-yard field goal by Noah Ruggles	54	7
"TOP" = time of possession. For other American football terms, see Glossary of American football.							54	7

=== vs No. 20 Penn State ===
No. 20 Penn State vs No. 5 Ohio State

Team	1	2	3	4	Total
No. 20 Penn State	7	3	14	0	24
• No. 5 Ohio State	3	14	10	6	33

- Date: October 30, 2021
- Location:
  Ohio Stadium
  Columbus, OH
- Game start: 7:44 p.m. EDT
- Elapsed time: 3:45
- Game attendance: 102,951
- Game weather: 54 °F (12 °C); cloudy; Wind: N 2 mph
- Referee: Mark Kluczynski
- TV announcers (ABC): Chris Fowler (play-by-play), Kirk Herbstreit (analyst), Holly Rowe (sideline)

Statistics	Penn State	Ohio State
First downs	27	22
Plays–yards	81–394	68–466
Rushes–yards	29–33	34–161
Passing yards	361	305
Passing: comp–att–int	38–52–1	22–34–0
Turnovers		
Time of possession	29:50	30:10

Team	Category	Player	Statistics
Penn State	Passing	Sean Clifford	35–52, 361 yds, 1 TD, 1 INT
Penn State	Rushing	John Lovett	13 att, 20 yds, 0 TD
Penn State	Receiving	Jahan Dotson	11 att, 127 yds, 0 TD
Ohio State	Passing	C. J. Stroud	22–34, 305 yds, 1 TD, 0 INT
Ohio State	Rushing	TreVeyon Henderson	28 att, 152 yds, 1 TD
Ohio State	Receiving	Jaxon Smith-Njigba	6 att, 97 yds, 0 TD

Scoring summary

Quarter	Time	Drive			Team	Scoring information	Score	
Quarter	Time	Plays	Yards	TOP	Team	Scoring information	Penn State	Ohio State
1	6:08	13	89	4:48	PSU	Brenton Strange 5-yard touchdown reception from Sean Clifford, Jordan Stout kick good	7	0
1	2:02	11	57	4:06	OSU	35-yard field goal by Noah Ruggles	7	3
2	3:48	5	69	1:38	OSU	Chris Olave 38-yard touchdown reception from C. J. Stroud, Noah Ruggles kick good	7	10
2	2:24	4	32	1:24	OSU	Fumble recovery returned 57 yards for touchdown by Jerron Cage, Noah Ruggles kick good	7	17
2	0:00	10	46	2:24	PSU	47-yard field goal by Jordan Stout	10	17
3	10:26	12	75	4:34	PSU	Jahan Dotson 2-yard touchdown run, Jordan Stout kick good	17	17
3	6:42	7	69	3:44	OSU	23-yard field goal by Noah Ruggles	17	20
3	3:35	3	71	0:42	OSU	TreVeyon Henderson 1-yard touchdown run, Noah Ruggles kick good	17	27
3	0:10	11	75	3:25	PSU	Keyvone Lee 1-yard touchdown run, Jordan Stout kick good	24	27
4	7:12	8	20	4:03	OSU	25-yard field goal by Noah Ruggles	24	30
4	2:41	8	69	3:14	OSU	26-yard field goal by Noah Ruggles	24	33
"TOP" = time of possession. For other American football terms, see Glossary of American football.							24	33

=== At Nebraska ===
No. 5 Ohio State at Nebraska

Team	1	2	3	4	Total
• No. 5 Ohio State	0	17	6	3	26
Nebraska	0	10	7	0	17

- Date: November 6, 2021
- Location:
  Memorial Stadium
  Lincoln, NE
- Game start: 12:05 p.m. EDT
- Elapsed time: 3:38
- Game attendance: 85,458
- Game weather: 53 °F (12 °C); Sunny; Wind: 8 mph
- Referee: Michael Cannon
- TV announcers (FOX): Gus Johnson (play-by-play), Joel Klatt (analyst) and Jenny Taft (sideline)

Statistics	Ohio State	Nebraska
First downs	25	18
Plays–yards	84–495	65–361
Rushes–yards	30–90	34–113
Passing yards	405	248
Passing: comp–att–int	36–54–2	16–31–1
Turnovers		
Time of possession	33:52	26:08

Team	Category	Player	Statistics
Ohio State	Passing	C. J. Stroud	36–54, 405 yds, 2 TD, 2 INT
Ohio State	Rushing	TreVeyon Henderson	21 att, 92 yds, 0 TD
Ohio State	Receiving	Jaxon Smith-Njigba	15 rec, 240 yds, 1 TD
Nebraska	Passing	Adrian Martinez	16–31, 248 yds, 1 TD, 1 INT
Nebraska	Rushing	Rahmir Johnson	16 att, 62 yds, 0 TD
Nebraska	Receiving	Samori Toure	4 rec, 150 yds, 0 TD

Scoring summary

Quarter	Time	Drive			Team	Scoring information	Score	
Quarter	Time	Plays	Yards	TOP	Team	Scoring information	Ohio State	Nebraska
2	11:25	11	57	4:52	OSU	26-yard field goal by Noah Ruggles	3	0
2	6:41	7	49	3:24	OSU	Chris Olave 3-yard touchdown reception from C. J. Stroud, Noah Ruggles kick good	10	0
2	3:52	8	54	2:49	NEB	39-yard field goal by Chase Contreraz	10	3
2	3:34	1	75	0:12	OSU	Jaxon Smith-Njigba 75-yard touchdown reception from C. J. Stroud, Noah Ruggles kick good	17	3
2	2:53	2	75	0:41	NEB	Samori Toure 72-yard touchdown reception from Adrian Martinez, Chase Contreraz kick good	17	10
3	9:42	5	23	2:44	OSU	46-yard field goal by Noah Ruggles	20	10
3	2:05	6	35	2:21	OSU	35-yard field goal by Noah Ruggles	23	10
3	0:22	5	75	1:43	NEB	Adrian Martinez 1-yard touchdown run, Chase Contreraz kick good	23	17
4	1:29	9	58	3:48	OSU	46-yard field goal by Noah Ruggles	26	17
"TOP" = time of possession. For other American football terms, see Glossary of American football.							26	17

=== vs No. 19 Purdue ===
No. 19 Purdue vs No. 4 Ohio State

Team	1	2	3	4	Total
No. 19 Purdue	7	10	14	0	31
• No. 4 Ohio State	21	24	7	7	59

- Date: November 13, 2021
- Location:
  Ohio Stadium
  Columbus, OH
- Game start: 3:41 p.m. EST
- Elapsed time: 3:22
- Game attendance: 101,009
- Game weather: 37 °F (3 °C); Cloudy; Wind: SW 15 mph
- Referee: Jeffrey Servinski
- TV announcers (ABC): Joe Tessitore, Greg McElroy, and Katie George

Statistics	Purdue	Ohio State
First downs	28	30
Plays–yards	71–481	69–624
Rushes–yards	19–91	31–263
Passing yards	390	361
Passing: comp–att–int	40–52–0	31–38–0
Turnovers		
Time of possession	28:42	31:18

Team	Category	Player	Statistics
Purdue	Passing	Aidan O'Connell	40–52, 390 yds, 4 TD, 0 INT
Purdue	Rushing	Zander Horvath	5 att, 36 yds, 0 TD
Purdue	Receiving	David Bell	11 rec, 103 yds, 0 TD
Ohio State	Passing	C. J. Stroud	31–38, 361 yds, 5 TD, 0 INT
Ohio State	Rushing	Miyan Williams	14 att, 117 yds, 0 TD
Ohio State	Receiving	Garrett Wilson	10 rec, 126 yds, 3 TD

Scoring summary

Quarter	Time	Drive			Team	Scoring information	Score	
Quarter	Time	Plays	Yards	TOP	Team	Scoring information	Purdue	Ohio State
1	11:45	5	39	2:10	OSU	Garrett Wilson 21-yard touchdown reception from C. J. Stroud, Noah Ruggles kick good	0	7
1	8:56	7	75	2:49	PUR	Jackson Anthrop 25-yard touchdown reception from Aidan O'Connell, Mitchell Fineran kick good	7	7
1	7:04	6	78	1:47	OSU	TreVeyon Henderson 3-yard touchdown run, Noah Ruggles kick good	7	14
1	5:14	1	57	0:09	OSU	TreVeyon Henderson 57-yard touchdown run, Noah Ruggles kick good	7	21
2	13:42	11	75	3:38	OSU	Jaxon Smith-Njigba 20-yard touchdown reception from C. J. Stroud, Noah Ruggles kick good	7	28
2	13:28	2	12	0:11	OSU	Garrett Wilson 12-yard touchdown reception from C. J. Stroud, Noah Ruggles kick good	7	35
2	9:01	10	80	4:21	PUR	Broc Thompson 12-yard touchdown reception from Aidan O'Connell, Mitchell Fineran kick good	14	35
2	7:22	4	75	1:39	OSU	Garrett Wilson 51-yard touchdown run, Noah Ruggles kick good	14	42
2	4:12	10	61	3:10	PUR	32-yard field goal by Mitchell Fineran	17	42
2	0:18	10	61	3:48	OSU	30-yard field goal by Noah Ruggles	17	45
3	10:48	8	75	4:12	OSU	Garrett Wilson 24-yard touchdown reception from C. J. Stroud, Noah Ruggles kick good	17	52
3	7:53	7	75	2:55	PUR	Milton Wright 29-yard touchdown reception from Aidan O'Connell, Mitchell Fineran kick good	24	52
3	2:02	10	87	4:09	PUR	Jackson Anthrop 9-yard touchdown reception from Aidan O'Connell, Mitchell Fineran kick good	31	52
4	12:51	9	75	4:11	OSU	Chris Olave 5-yard touchdown reception from C. J. Stroud, Noah Ruggles kick good	31	59
"TOP" = time of possession. For other American football terms, see Glossary of American football.							31	59

=== vs No. 7 Michigan State ===
No. 7 Michigan State vs No. 4 Ohio State

Team	1	2	3	4	Total
No. 7 Michigan State	0	0	0	7	7
• No. 4 Ohio State	21	28	0	7	56

- Date: November 20, 2021
- Location:
  Ohio Stadium
  Columbus, OH
- Game start: 12:10 p.m. EST
- Elapsed time: 3:19
- Game attendance: 101,858
- Game weather: 49 °F (9 °C); Cloudy; Wind: SW 15 mph
- Referee: John O'Neill
- TV announcers (ABC): Chris Fowler, Kirk Herbstreit, Holly Row.

Statistics	Michigan State	Ohio State
First downs	12	36
Plays–yards	59–224	86–655
Rushes–yards	21–66	43–206
Passing yards	158	449
Passing: comp–att–int	16–38–0	36–43–1
Turnovers		
Time of possession	22:02	37:58

Team	Category	Player	Statistics
Michigan State	Passing	Payton Thorne	14–36, 158 yds, 1 TD, 0 INT
Michigan State	Rushing	Elijah Collins	3 att, 29 yds, 0 TD
Michigan State	Receiving	Connor Heyward	4 rec, 20 yds, 0 TD
Ohio State	Passing	C. J. Stroud	32–35, 432 yds, 6 TD, 0 INT
Ohio State	Rushing	Master Teague	21 att, 95 yds, 1 TD
Ohio State	Receiving	Jaxon Smith-Njigba	10 rec, 105 yds, 1 TD

Scoring summary

Quarter	Time	Drive			Team	Scoring information	Score	
Quarter	Time	Plays	Yards	TOP	Team	Scoring information	Michigan State	Ohio State
1	10:42	12	86	4:12	OSU	Chris Olave 23-yard touchdown reception from C. J. Stroud, Noah Ruggles kick good	0	7
1	8:03	4	88	1:16	OSU	Garrett Wilson 77-yard touchdown reception from C. J. Stroud, Noah Ruggles kick good	0	14
1	2:31	4	71	1:24	OSU	Chris Olave 43-yard touchdown reception from C. J. Stroud, Noah Ruggles kick good	0	21
2	14:05	6	44	1:48	OSU	Julian Fleming 4-yard touchdown reception from C. J. Stroud, Noah Ruggles kick good	0	28
2	10:02	6	70	2:46	OSU	Miyan Williams 1-yard touchdown run, Noah Ruggles kick good	0	35
2	7:01	6	57	2:15	OSU	Garrett Wilson 12-yard touchdown reception from C. J. Stroud, Noah Ruggles kick good	0	42
2	1:37	10	85	3:52	OSU	Jaxon Smith-Njigba 5-yard touchdown reception from C. J. Stroud, Noah Ruggles kick good	0	49
4	14:55	8	51	2:32	MSU	Keon Coleman 12-yard touchdown reception from Payton Thorne, Stephan Rusnak kick good	7	49
4	3:30	16	75	8:32	OSU	Master Teague 1-yard touchdown run, Noah Ruggles kick good	7	56
"TOP" = time of possession. For other American football terms, see Glossary of American football.							7	56

=== At No. 5 Michigan ===
No. 2 Ohio State at No. 5 Michigan

Team	1	2	3	4	Total
No. 2 Ohio State	3	10	0	14	27
• No. 5 Michigan	7	7	14	14	42

- Date: November 27, 2021
- Location:
  Michigan Stadium
  Ann Arbor, MI
- Game start: 12:14 p.m. EST
- Elapsed time: 3:21
- Game attendance: 111,156
- Game weather: 31 °F (−1 °C); Snow;
- Referee: Larry Smith
- TV announcers (FOX): Gus Johnson (play-by-play), Joel Klatt (analyst) and Jenny Taft (sideline)

Statistics	Ohio State	Michigan
First downs	23	24
Plays–yards	79–458	487
Rushes–yards	30–64	41–297
Passing yards	394	190
Passing: comp–att–int	34–49–0	14–20–1
Turnovers		
Time of possession	31:48	28:12

Team	Category	Player	Statistics
Ohio State	Passing	C. J. Stroud	34–49, 394 yds, 2 TDs
Ohio State	Rushing	TreVeyon Henderson	17 att, 74 yds, 1 TD
Ohio State	Receiving	Jaxon Smith-Njigba	11 rec, 127 yds
Michigan	Passing	Cade McNamara	13–19, 159 yds, 1 INT
Michigan	Rushing	Hassan Haskins	28 att, 169 yds, 5 TDs
Michigan	Receiving	Roman Wilson	2 rec, 55 yds

Scoring summary

Quarter	Time	Drive			Team	Scoring information	Score	
Quarter	Time	Plays	Yards	TOP	Team	Scoring information	Ohio State	Michigan
1	10:12	10	75	4:48	MICH	A. J. Henning 14-yard touchdown run, Jake Moody kick good	0	7
1	3:36	12	64	5:08	OSU	31-yard field goal by Noah Ruggles	3	7
2	9:12	4	56	1:39	OSU	Garrett Wilson 25-yard touchdown reception from C. J. Stroud, Noah Ruggles kick good	10	7
2	3:51	13	82	5:15	MICH	Hassan Haskins 1-yard touchdown run, Jake Moody kick good	10	14
2	0:09	12	62	3:42	OSU	30-yard field goal by Noah Ruggles	13	14
3	11:50	3	81	1:15	MICH	Hassan Haskins 13-yard touchdown run, Jake Moody kick good	13	21
3	5:49	5	78	2:30	MICH	Hassan Haskins 1-yard touchdown run, Jake Moody kick good	13	28
4	14:05	17	82	6:41	OSU	TreVeyon Henderson 1-yard touchdown run, Noah Ruggles kick good	20	28
4	9:14	9	66	4:46	MICH	Hassan Haskins 2-yard touchdown run, Jake Moody kick good	20	35
4	4:45	13	75	4:29	OSU	TreVeyon Henderson 10-yard touchdown reception from C. J. Stroud, Noah Ruggles kick good	27	35
4	2:17	5	63	2:22	MICH	Hassan Haskins 4-yard touchdown run, Jake Moody kick good	27	42
"TOP" = time of possession. For other American football terms, see Glossary of American football.							27	42

== Awards and honors ==
NCAA Recognized All-American Honors
Player	Position	AFCA	AP	FWAA	Sporting News	WCFF	Designation
Chris Olave	WR	1st Team	2nd Team	2nd Team		2nd Team	
Thayer Munford	OL	1st Team	2nd Team				
Garrett Wilson	WR		2nd Team	1st Team			
Nicholas Petit-Frere	OL		2nd Team	1st Team		2nd Team	
Noah Ruggles	K	2nd Team	2nd Team			2nd Team	
Jaxon Smith-Njigba	WR		3rd Team		2nd Team		
Haskell Garrett	DT		2nd Team				
C. J. Stroud	QB		3rd Team				

*The NCAA and Ohio State only recognize the AP, AFCA, FWAA, Sporting News and WCFF All-American teams to determine if a player is a Consensus or Unanimous All-American. To be named a Consensus All-American, a player must be named first team in three polls and to be Unanimous, they must be named first team in all five. See 2021 College Football All-America Team

All-Conference Honors
Player	Position	Coaches	Media	AP
Haskell Garrett	DL	1st Team	1st Team	1st Team
Thayer Munford	OG	1st Team	1st Team	1st Team
Chris Olave	WR	1st Team	2nd Team	1st Team
Nicholas Petit-Frere	OT	1st Team	1st Team	1st Team
C. J. Stroud	QB	1st Team	1st Team	1st Team
TreVeyon Henderson	RB	2nd Team	2nd Team	2nd Team
Paris Johnson Jr.	OG	2nd Team	3rd Team	
Garrett Wilson	WR	2nd Team	2nd Team	2nd Team
Noah Ruggles	K	2nd Team	2nd Team	
Tyreke Smith	DL	2nd Team	3rd Team	
Ronnie Hickman	DB	2nd Team	3rd Team	
Zach Harrison	DL	3rd Team	2nd Team	
Dawand Jones	OT	3rd Team	2nd Team	
Jaxon Smith-Njigba	WR	3rd Team	3rd Team	
Denzel Burke	DB	3rd Team	HM	2nd Team
Jeremy Ruckert	TE	HM	HM	
Sevyn Banks	DB	HM	HM	
Cam Brown	DB	HM	HM	
Antwuan Jackson	DL	HM	HM	
Matthew Jones	OL		HM	
Luke Wypler	OC		HM	
Steele Chambers	LB		HM	
Tommy Eichenberg	LB		HM	
Bryson Shaw	DB		HM	
Taron Vincent	DL		HM	
Tyleik Williams	DL		HM	
Emeka Egbuka	RS	HM	HM	

=== Player of the Game Awards ===
Player of the Game Awards
Week	Award	Player	Ref.
1 (Minnesota)	Offensive Player of the Game	Chris Olave	
1 (Minnesota)	Offensive Player of the Game	Miyan Williams	
1 (Minnesota)	Defensive Player of the Game	Zach Harrison	
1 (Minnesota)	Special Teams Player of the Game	Mitch Rossi	
3 (Tulsa)	Offensive Player of the Game	TreVeyon Henderson	
3 (Tulsa)	Defensive Player of the Game	Cameron Martinez	
3 (Tulsa)	Special Teams Player of the Game	Cade Kacherski	
3 (Tulsa)	Special Teams Player of the Game	Xavier Johnson	
4 (Akron)	Offensive Player of the Game	Dawand Jones	
4 (Akron)	Offensive Player of the Game	Garrett Wilson	
4 (Akron)	Defensive Player of the Game	Tyleik Williams	
4 (Akron)	Special Teams Player of the Game	Jesse Mirco	
5 (Rutgers)	Offensive Player of the Game	C. J. Stroud	
5 (Rutgers)	Defensive Player of the Game	Ronnie Hickman	
5 (Rutgers)	Special Teams Player of the Game	Cade Kacherski (2)	
5 (Rutgers)	Special Teams Player of the Game	Demario McCall	
6 (Maryland)	Offensive Player of the Game	Jaxon Smith-Njigba	
6 (Maryland)	Defensive Player of the Game	Steele Chambers	
6 (Maryland)	Special Teams Player of the Game	Emeka Egbuka	
7 (Indiana)	Offensive Player of the Game	C. J. Stroud (2)	
7 (Indiana)	Offensive Player of the Game	Jeremy Ruckert	
7 (Indiana)	Defensive Player of the Game	Zach Harrison (2)	
7 (Indiana)	Special Teams Player of the Game	Teradja Mitchell	
7 (Indiana)	Special Teams Player of the Game	Demario McCall (2)	
8 (Penn State)	Offensive Player of the Game	none	
8 (Penn State)	Defensive Player of the Game	Jerron Cage	
8 (Penn State)	Special Teams Player of the Game	Noah Ruggles	
9 (Nebraska)	Offensive Player of the Game	Jaxon Smith-Njigba (2)	
9 (Nebraska)	Defensive Player of the Game	Ronnie Hickman (2)	
9 (Nebraska)	Defensive Player of the Game	Tyreke Smith	
9 (Nebraska)	Special Teams Player of the Game	Noah Ruggles (2)	
9 (Nebraska)	Special Teams Player of the Game	Jesse Mirco (2)	
10 (Purdue)	Offensive Player of the Game	C. J. Stroud (3)	
10 (Purdue)	Offensive Player of the Game	Garrett Wilson (2)	
10 (Purdue)	Defensive Player of the Game	Lathan Ransom	
10 (Purdue)	Special Teams Player of the Game	Chris Booker	
11 (Michigan State)	Offensive Player of the Game	C. J. Stroud (4)	
11 (Michigan State)	Offensive Player of the Game	Chris Olave (2)	
11 (Michigan State)	Defensive Player of the Game	Defensive Line	
11 (Michigan State)	Special Teams Player of the Game	Demario McCall (3)	

=== Weekly awards ===
Weekly awards
Player	Award	Date awarded	Ref.
Zach Harrison	PFF Game-Changing Moment of the Week	September 5, 2021	
C. J. Stroud	Big Ten Freshman of the Week	September 6, 2021	
C. J. Stroud	Big Ten Freshman of the Week	September 13, 2021	
C. J. Stroud	Big Ten Freshman of the Week	October 4, 2021	
C. J. Stroud	Big Ten Freshman of the Week	October 11, 2021	
C. J. Stroud	Big Ten co-Offensive Player of the Week	October 11, 2021	
C. J. Stroud	Big Ten Freshman of the Week	October 25, 2021	
C. J. Stroud	Big Ten Freshman of the Week	November 15, 2021	
C. J. Stroud	Big Ten Freshman of the Week	November 22, 2021	
C. J. Stroud	Big Ten Offensive Player of the Week	November 22, 2021	
C. J. Stroud	Pro Football Network Offensive Player of the Week	October 10, 2021	
C. J. Stroud	Walter Camp National Player of the Week	November 21, 2021	
C. J. Stroud	PFF Offensive Player of the Week	November 21, 2021	
C. J. Stroud	Athlon Sports Offensive Player of the Week	November 21, 2021	
TreVeyon Henderson	Big Ten Freshman of the Week	September 20, 2021	
TreVeyon Henderson	Big Ten co-Offensive Player of the Week	September 20, 2021	
Kyle McCord	Big Ten Freshman of the Week	September 27, 2021	
Haskell Garrett	Pro Football Network Defensive Player of the Week	September 26, 2021	
Noah Ruggles	Big Ten co-Special Teams Player of the Week	November 1, 2021	
Noah Ruggles	Lou Groza Award Star of the Week	November 1, 2021	
Noah Ruggles	Lou Groza Award Star of the Week	November 8, 2021	
Garrett Wilson	Big Ten co-Offensive Player of the Week	November 15, 2021	
Garrett Wilson	Pro Football Network Offensive Player of the Week	November 14, 2021	

=== Annual awards ===
Annual Awards
Player	Award	Ref.
TreVeyon Henderson	Doak Walker Award Semifinalist	
TreVeyon Henderson	Walter Camp Award Semifinalist	
Thayer Munford	Lombardi Award Semifinalist	
Offensive Line	Joe Moore Award Semifinalist	
Chris Olave	Fred Biletnikoff Award Semifinalist	
Nicholas Petit-Frere	Outland Trophy Semifinalist	
Bradley Robinson	Patrick Mannelly Award Nominee	
Mitch Rossi	Burlsworth Trophy Nominee	
Jeremy Ruckert	William V. Campbell Trophy Semifinalist	
Noah Ruggles	Lou Groza Award Finalist	
Jaxon Smith-Njigba	Earl Campbell Tyler Rose Award Semifinalist	
C. J. Stroud	Davey O’Brien Award Finalist	
C. J. Stroud	Manning Award Finalist	
C. J. Stroud	Maxwell Award Semifinalist	
C. J. Stroud	Walter Camp Award Semifinalist	
C. J. Stroud	AP Big Ten co–Offensive Player of the Year	
C. J. Stroud	Heisman Trophy Finalist	
Garrett Wilson	Earl Campbell Tyler Rose Award Semifinalist	
Kevin Wilson	Broyles Award Semifinalist	
Big Ten Awards
C. J. Stroud	Big Ten Offensive Player of the Year	
C. J. Stroud	Griese-Brees Quarterback of the Year	
C. J. Stroud	Thompson-Randle El Freshman of the Year	

== Rankings ==
Ranking movements Legend: ██ Increase in ranking ██ Decrease in ranking ( ) = First-place votes
	Week															
Poll	Pre	1	2	3	4	5	6	7	8	9	10	11	12	13	14	Final
AP	4 (1)	3	9	10	11	7	6	5	5	6	6	5	2	7	7	6
Coaches	4	3	11	12	10	7	6	5	5	5	5	4	3	7	7	5
CFP	Not released									5	4	4	2	7	6	Not released

== Players drafted into the NFL ==
Round	Pick	Player	Position	NFL Club
1	10	Garrett Wilson	WR	New York Jets
1	11	Chris Olave	WR	New Orleans Saints
3	69	Nicholas Petit-Frere	OT	Tennessee Titans
3	101	Jeremy Ruckert	TE	New York Jets
5	158	Tyreke Smith	DE	Seattle Seahawks
7	238	Thayer Munford	OT	Las Vegas Raiders
