= 2021 All-Big Ten Conference football team =

American college football all-star team

The 2021 All-Big Ten Conference football team consists of American football players chosen as All-Big Ten Conference players for the 2021 Big Ten Conference football season. The conference recognizes two official All-Big Ten selectors: (1) the Big Ten conference coaches selected separate offensive and defensive units and named first-, second- and third-team players (the "Coaches" team); and (2) a panel of sports writers and broadcasters covering the Big Ten also selected offensive and defensive units and named first-, second- and third-team players (the "Media" team).

== Key ==
Bold = Consensus first-team selection by both the coaches and media

Coaches = Selected by the Big Ten Conference coaches

Media = Selected by the conference media

== Offensive selections ==
=== Quarterbacks ===
- **C. J. Stroud**, Ohio State (Coaches-1; Media-1)
- Aidan O'Connell, Purdue (Coaches-2; Media-2)
- Cade McNamara, Michigan (Coaches-3; Media-3)

=== Running backs ===
- **Kenneth Walker III**, Michigan State (Coaches-1; Media-1)
- **Hassan Haskins**, Michigan (Coaches-1; Media-1)
- TreVeyon Henderson, Ohio State (Coaches-2; Media-2)
- Braelon Allen, Wisconsin (Coaches-2; Media-2)
- Chase Brown, Illinois (Coaches-3; Media-3)
- Blake Corum, Michigan (Coaches-3)
- Tyler Goodson, Iowa (Media-3)

=== Wide receivers ===
- **David Bell**, Purdue (Coaches-1; Media-1)
- Chris Olave, Ohio State (Coaches-1; Media-2)
- Jahan Dotson, Penn State (Coaches-2; Media-1)
- Garrett Wilson, Ohio State (Coaches-2; Media-2)
- Jayden Reed, Michigan State (Coaches-3; Media-3)
- Jaxon Smith-Njigba, Ohio State (Coaches-3; Media-3)

=== Centers ===
- **Tyler Linderbaum**, Iowa (Coaches-1; Media-1)
- John Michael Schmitz, Minnesota (Coaches-2; Media-3)
- Doug Kramer, Illinois (Coaches-2)
- Andrew Vastardis, Michigan (Media-2)
- Cam Jurgens, Nebraska (Coaches-3)

=== Guards ===
- **Thayer Munford**, Ohio State (Coaches-1; Media-1)
- Josh Seltzner, Wisconsin (Coaches-1; Media-2)
- Blaise Andries, Minnesota (Coaches-3; Media-1)
- Kyler Schott, Iowa (Coaches-2; Media-3)
- Paris Johnson Jr., Ohio State (Coaches-2; Media-3)
- Zak Zinter, Michigan (Media-2)
- Conner Olson, Minnesota (Coaches-3)

=== Tackles ===
- **Nicholas Petit-Frere**, Ohio State (Coaches-1; Media-1)
- Daniel Faalele, Minnesota (Coaches-1; Media-3)
- Andrew Stueber, Michigan (Coaches-3; Media-1)
- Peter Skoronski, Northwestern (Coaches-2; Media-1)
- Logan Bruss, Wisconsin (Coaches-2; Media-2)
- Ryan Hayes, Michigan (Coaches-2)
- Dawand Jones, Ohio State (Coaches-3, Media-2)
- Tyler Beach, Wisconsin (Coaches-3)
- Rasheed Walker, Penn State (Media-3)

=== Tight ends ===
- Jake Ferguson, Wisconsin (Coaches-1; Media-2)
- Austin Allen, Nebraska (Coaches-2; Media-1)
- Sam LaPorta, Iowa (Coaches-3; Media-2)
- Peyton Hendershot, Indiana (Media-3)

== Defensive selections ==
=== Defensive linemen ===
- **Arnold Ebiketie**, Penn State (Coaches-1; Media-1)
- **Haskell Garrett**, Ohio State (Coaches-1; Media-1)
- **Aidan Hutchinson**, Michigan (Coaches-1; Media-1)
- **George Karlaftis**, Purdue (Coaches-1; Media-1)
- Jacub Panasiuk, Michigan State (Coaches-2; Media-2)
- Zach VanValkenburg, Iowa (Coaches-2; Media-2)
- Zach Harrison, Ohio State (Coaches-3; Media-2)
- Boye Mafe, Minnesota (Coaches-3; Media-2)
- Tyreke Smith, Ohio State (Coaches-2; Media-3)
- Matt Henningsen, Wisconsin (Coaches-3; Media-3)
- P. J. Mustipher, Penn State (Coaches-2)
- Keeanu Benton, Wisconsin (Coaches-2)
- Sam Okuayinonu, Maryland (Coaches-3)
- Jacob Slade, Michigan State (Media-3)
- Jesse Luketa, Penn State (Media-3)

=== Linebackers ===
- **Leo Chenal**, Wisconsin (Coaches-1; Media-1)
- **David Ojabo**, Michigan (Coaches-1; Media-1)
- Jack Sanborn, Wisconsin (Coaches-1; Media-2)
- Jack Campbell, Iowa (Coaches-3; Media-1)
- Micah McFadden, Indiana (Coaches-2; Media-2)
- Chris Bergin, Northwestern (Coaches-3; Media-2)
- JoJo Domann, Nebraska (Coaches-2; Media-3)
- Ellis Brooks, Penn State (Coaches-2)
- Brandon Smith, Penn State (Coaches-3)
- Josh Ross, Michigan (Media-3)
- Olakunle Fatukasi, Rutgers (Media-3)

=== Defensive backs ===
- **Dane Belton**, Iowa (Coaches-1; Media-1)
- **Jaquan Brisker**, Penn State (Coaches-1; Media-1)
- **Riley Moss**, Iowa (Coaches-1; Media-1)
- Daxton Hill, Michigan (Coaches-1; Media-2)
- Kerby Joseph, Illinois (Coaches-2; Media-1)
- Matt Hankins, Iowa (Coaches-2; Media-2)
- Cam Taylor-Britt, Nebraska (Coaches-2; Media-2)
- Ronnie Hickman, Ohio State (Coaches-2; Media-3)
- Brandon Joseph, Northwestern (Media-2)
- Denzel Burke, Ohio State (Coaches-3)
- Ji'Ayir Brown, Penn State (Coaches-3)
- Joey Porter Jr., Penn State (Coaches-3)
- Caesar Williams, Wisconsin (Coaches-3)
- Vincent Gray, Michigan (Media-3)
- Brad Hawkins, Michigan (Media-3)
- Xavier Henderson, Michigan State (Media-3)

== Special teams ==
=== Kickers ===
- Jake Moody, Michigan (Coaches-1; Media-3)
- Caleb Shudak, Iowa (Coaches-2; Media-1)
- Noah Ruggles, Ohio State (Coaches-2; Media-2)
- James McCourt, Illinois (Coaches-3)

=== Punters ===
- **Jordan Stout**, Penn State (Coaches-1; Media-1)
- Adam Korsak, Rutgers (Coaches-1; Media-3)
- Bryce Baringer, Michigan State (Coaches-2; Media-2)
- Blake Hayes, Illinois (Coaches-3)

=== Return specialist ===
- **Charlie Jones**, Iowa (Coaches-1; Media-1)
- Jayden Reed, Michigan State (Coaches-2; Media-2)
- A. J. Henning, Michigan (Coaches-3; Media-3)
- Jahan Dotson, Penn State (Coaches-3)

== See also ==
- 2021 College Football All-America Team
