= Thayer Munford =

American football player (born 1999)

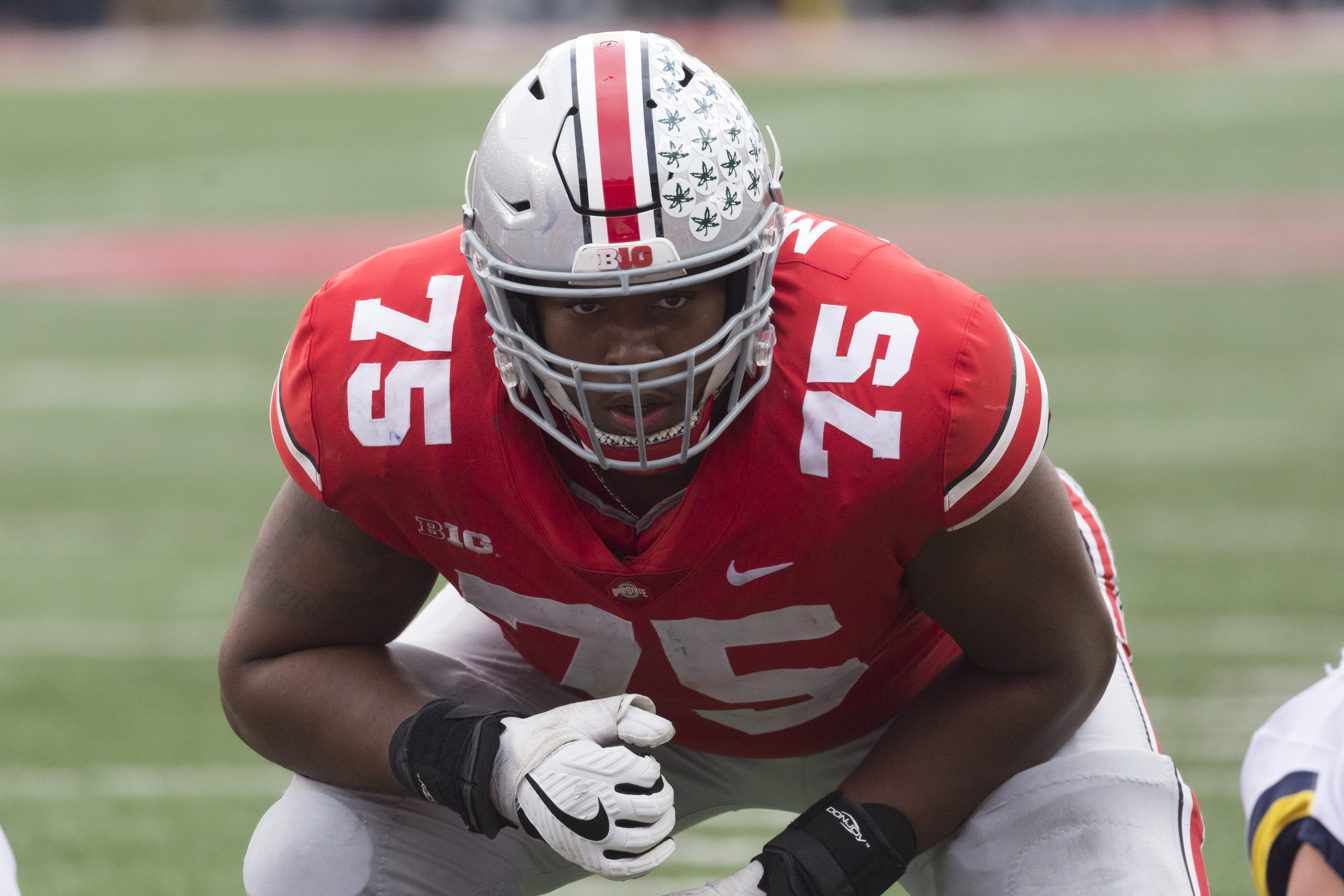
- Munford with the Ohio State Buckeyes in 2018

Profile
- Position: Offensive tackle

Personal information
- Born: September 18, 1999 (age 27); Cincinnati, Ohio, U.S.
- Listed height: 6 ft 6 in (1.98 m)
- Listed weight: 331 lb (150 kg)

Career information
- High school: La Salle (Cincinnati)
- College: Ohio State (2017–2021)
- NFL draft: 2022: 7th round, 238th overall pick

Career history
- Las Vegas Raiders (2022–2024); New England Patriots (2025)*; Cleveland Browns (2025); New England Patriots (2025)
- * Offseason or practice squad member only

Awards and highlights
- First-team All-American (2021); 2× First-team All-Big Ten (2020, 2021); Second-team All-Big Ten (2019)

Career NFL statistics as of 2025
- Games played: 51
- Games started: 20
- Stats at Pro Football Reference

Thayer Munford Jr. (born September 18, 1999) is an American professional football offensive tackle. He played college football for the Ohio State Buckeyes.

== Early life ==
Munford grew up in Cincinnati, Ohio and initially attended La Salle High School. Before his senior year, he moved to Massillon, Ohio and transferred to Massillon Washington High School who were coached by his former coach at La Salle, Nate Moore. Moore and his wife took legal custody of Munford shortly before his senior year. He was originally ruled ineligible by the Ohio High School Athletic Association after it was ruled that his transfer was a violation of the organization's recruiting rules. The ruling was later reversed and Munford was eligible for the final three games of the season. Munford was rated a four star recruit and committed to play college football at Ohio State over offers from Kentucky, Iowa, and Pittsburgh.

== College career ==
Munford played as a reserve offensive lineman as a freshman. He was named a starter going into his sophomore season and started the first 13 games of the season before suffering a back injury. Munford started all of the Buckeyes games as a junior and was named second team All-Big Ten Conference. As a senior, he was named first team All-Big Ten after starting all seven of Ohio State's games in the team's COVID-19-shortened 2020 season. After considering entering the 2021 NFL Draft, Munford decided to utilize the extra year of eligibility granted to college athletes who played in the 2020 season due to the coronavirus pandemic and return to Ohio State for a fifth season. He was moved to left guard prior to the start of the season. Munford was named first team All-Big Ten and a first team All-American by the American Football Coaches Association in his final season. He moved back to the tackle position for the 2022 Rose Bowl, his last game at Ohio State, after Nicholas Petit-Frere opted out of the game to prepare for the NFL draft.

== Professional career ==
Pre-draft measurables
Height	Weight	Arm length	Hand span	Wingspan	40-yard dash	10-yard split	20-yard split	20-yard shuttle	Three-cone drill	Vertical jump	Broad jump	Bench press
6 ft 5 3/4 in (1.97 m)	328 lb (149 kg)	35 1/8 in (0.89 m)	10 1/8 in (0.26 m)	7 ft 0 5/8 in (2.15 m)	5.39 s	1.80 s	3.07 s	4.77 s	7.74 s	22.0 in (0.56 m)	8 ft 8 in (2.64 m)	22 reps
All values from NFL Combine/Pro Day

=== Las Vegas Raiders ===
Munford was selected by the Las Vegas Raiders in the seventh round, 238th overall, of the 2022 NFL draft. As a rookie, he appeared in all 17 games and started four. He appeared in 15 games and started ten in the 2023 season.

On August 27, 2025, Munford was released by the Raiders.

=== New England Patriots ===
On August 29, 2025, Munford was signed to the New England Patriots practice squad.

=== Cleveland Browns ===
On September 24, 2025, Munford was signed by the Cleveland Browns from the Patriots practice squad. He was waived on October 13 and re-signed to the practice squad two days later.

=== New England Patriots (second stint) ===
On November 25, 2025, Munford was signed to the New England Patriots' active roster from the Browns practice squad.
