= Luke Wypler =

American football player (born 2001)

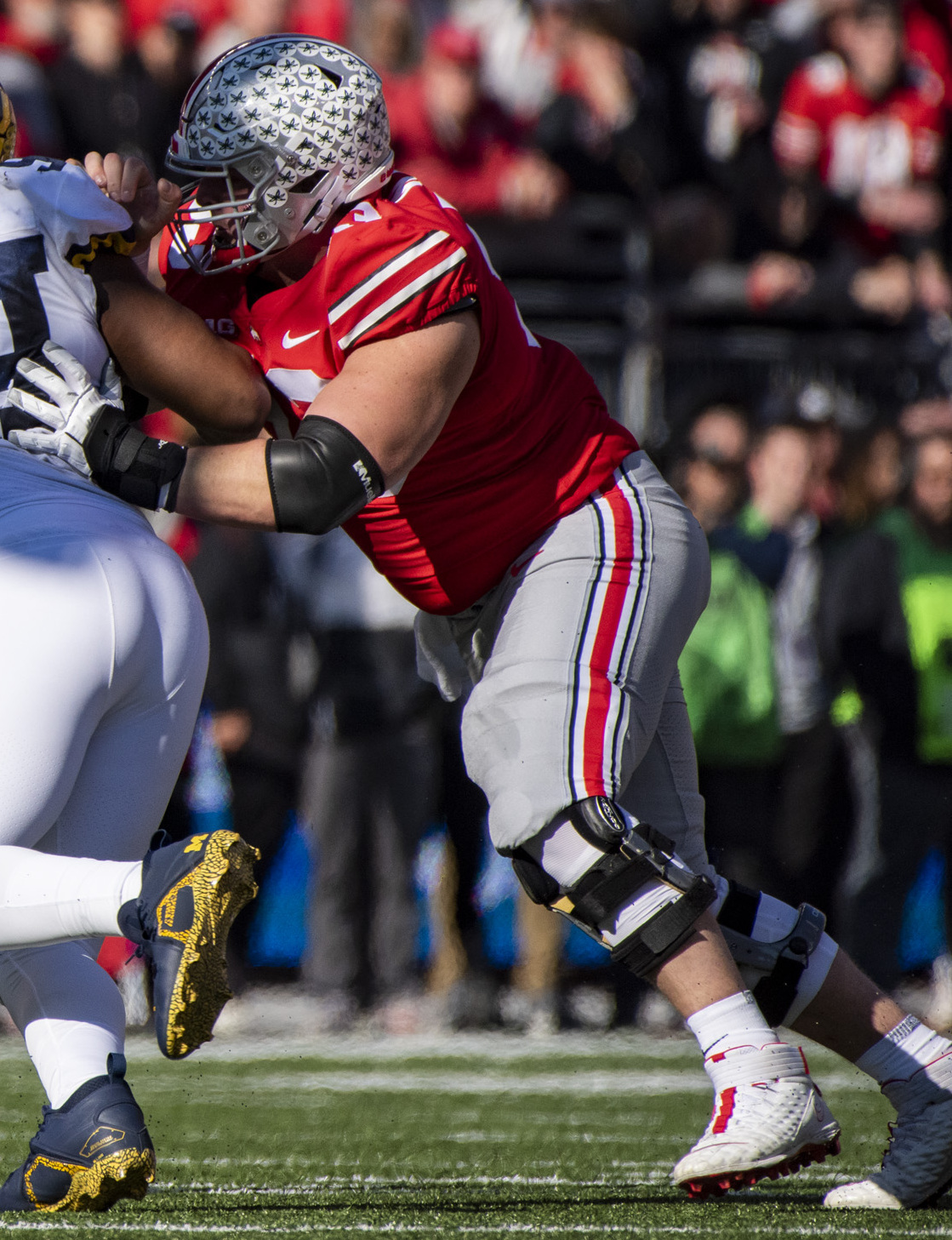
- Wypler with the Ohio State Buckeyes in 2022

No. 56 – Cleveland Browns
- Position: Center
- Roster status: Active

Personal information
- Born: May 3, 2001 (age 25); Englewood, New Jersey, U.S.
- Listed height: 6 ft 3 in (1.91 m)
- Listed weight: 303 lb (137 kg)

Career information
- High school: Saint Joseph Regional (Montvale, New Jersey)
- College: Ohio State (2020–2022)
- NFL draft: 2023: 6th round, 190th overall pick

Career history
- Cleveland Browns (2023–present)

Awards and highlights
- Third-team All-Big Ten (2022)

Career NFL statistics as of 2024
- Games played: 22
- Games started: 6
- Stats at Pro Football Reference

Luke Wypler (/ˈwɪplər/ WIP-lər; born May 3, 2001) is an American professional football center for the Cleveland Browns of the National Football League (NFL). He played college football for the Ohio State Buckeyes.

== Early life ==
Wypler was born on May 3, 2001, in Englewood, New Jersey. He grew up in Dunellen, New Jersey, and attended Saint Joseph Regional High School. Wypler committed to play college football for the Buckeyes at Ohio State University.

== College career ==
Wypler played in one game during his true freshman season at Ohio State before redshirting the season. He was named the Buckeyes starting center entering his redshirt freshman season. Wypler started 13 games and an honorable mention on the 2021 All-Big Ten team. He was named third-team All-Big Ten as a redshirt sophomore.

== Professional career ==
Pre-draft measurables
Height	Weight	Arm length	Hand span	Wingspan	40-yard dash	10-yard split	20-yard split	20-yard shuttle	Three-cone drill	Vertical jump	Broad jump	Bench press
6 ft 2 5/8 in (1.90 m)	303 lb (137 kg)	31 5/8 in (0.80 m)	9 5/8 in (0.24 m)	6 ft 5 1/8 in (1.96 m)	5.14 s	1.83 s	2.90 s	4.53 s	7.64 s	30.5 in (0.77 m)	8 ft 10 in (2.69 m)	29 reps
All values from the NFL Combine

Wypler was selected by the Cleveland Browns in the sixth round, 190th overall, of the 2023 NFL draft. As a rookie, he appeared in five games and started one in the 2023 season.

On August 10, 2024, Wypler suffered an ankle injury during Cleveland's first preseason game against the Green Bay Packers. Following the game, head coach Kevin Stefanski announced that Wypler would be undergoing surgery to address the injury. He was placed on season-ending injured reserve on August 27.
