= Paris Johnson =

American football player (born 1976)

Personal information
- Born: January 18, 1976 (age 50); Chicago, Illinois, U.S.
- Listed height: 6 ft 2 in (1.88 m)
- Listed weight: 207 lb (94 kg)

Career information
- High school: Proviso West (IL); River Forest (IL)
- College: Miami (OH)
- NFL draft: 1999: 5th round, 155th overall pick

Career history
- Arizona Cardinals (1999); Rhein Fire (2001); Miami Dolphins (2001)*; Dallas Cowboys (2002)*
- * Offseason or practice squad member only

Awards and highlights
- First-team All-MAC (1997)

Paris Sharizz Johnson Sr. (born January 18, 1976) is an American former professional football safety who played for the Arizona Cardinals. He was selected by the Cardinals in the fifth round of the 1999 NFL draft and spent his only NFL season with them, though he never played in a regular season game for them. Beginning in 2013, Johnson works for Michigan State University as a coach and assistant for the football program.

Pre-draft measurables
Height	Weight	40-yard dash	10-yard split	20-yard split	20-yard shuttle	Vertical jump	Broad jump	Bench press
6 ft 2 in (1.88 m)	207 lb (94 kg)	4.71 s	1.64 s	2.67 s	4.32 s	35.0 in (0.89 m)	9 ft 9 in (2.97 m)	16 reps

He is the father of current Arizona Cardinals offensive tackle Paris Johnson Jr.
