= Jerron Cage =

American football player (born 1998)

Profile
- Position: Defensive tackle

Personal information
- Born: November 25, 1998 (age 27); Cincinnati, Ohio, U.S.
- Listed height: 6 ft 2 in (1.88 m)
- Listed weight: 307 lb (139 kg)

Career information
- High school: Winton Woods (Forest Park, Ohio)
- College: Ohio State (2017–2022)
- NFL draft: 2023: undrafted

Career history
- New Orleans Saints (2023)*; Montreal Alouettes (2024); Columbus Aviators (2026)
- * Offseason or practice squad member only
- Stats at Pro Football Reference

Jerron Cage (born November 25, 1998) is an American professional football defensive tackle. He played college football at Ohio State.

== College career ==
Cage was ranked as a four–star recruit by 247Sports.com coming out of Winton Woods High School. He committed to Ohio State on July 21, 2015, over offers from Cincinnati, Kentucky, and Louisville. His first start for Ohio State was in the 2021 College Football Playoff National Championship in place of fellow defensive tackle Tommy Togiai, who tested positive for COVID-19. On October 31, 2021, Cage recovered a fumble by Penn State quarterback Sean Clifford and took it 57 yards for a touchdown. Prior to the 2023 NFL draft, he accepted an invitation to play in the Hula Bowl.

== Professional career ==
=== New Orleans Saints ===
Cage signed with the New Orleans Saints after going undrafted in the 2023 NFL draft. He was waived by New Orleans as a part of final roster cuts on August 29, 2023.

=== Montreal Alouettes ===
On January 29, 2024, Cage signed with the Montreal Alouettes. He was released by the Alouettes on May 15. Cage was signed to the Alouettes' practice roster on October 13. Cage re-signed with the Alouettes on December 23.

=== Columbus Aviators ===
On March 23, 2026, Cage signed with the Columbus Aviators. He was released by the Aviators on April 22.

== Personal life ==
Cage's son, Jerron Jr., was born in June 2020.
