= Paris Johnson Jr. =

American football player (born 2001)

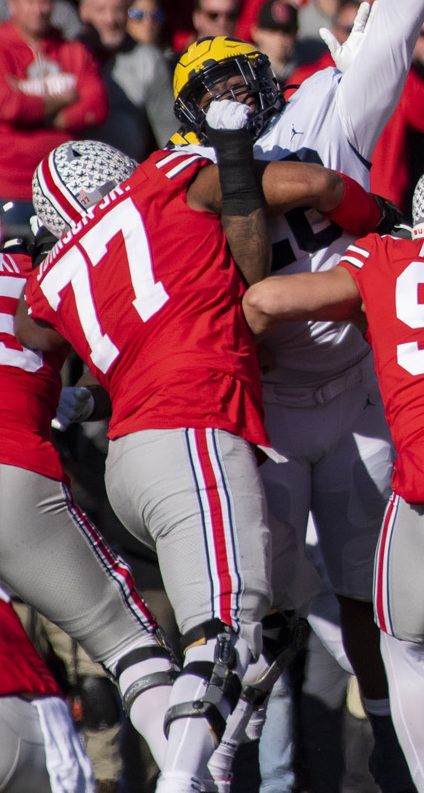
- Johnson (77) with the Ohio State Buckeyes in 2022

No. 70 – Arizona Cardinals
- Position: Offensive tackle
- Roster status: Injured reserve

Personal information
- Born: July 3, 2001 (age 25); Cincinnati, Ohio, U.S.
- Listed height: 6 ft 6 in (1.98 m)
- Listed weight: 325 lb (147 kg)

Career information
- High school: Princeton (Sharonville, Ohio)
- College: Ohio State (2020–2022)
- NFL draft: 2023: 1st round, 6th overall pick

Career history
- Arizona Cardinals (2023–present)

Awards and highlights
- Consensus All-American (2022); First-team All-Big Ten (2022); Second-team All-Big Ten (2021)

Career NFL statistics as of 2025
- Games started: 43
- Games played: 43
- Stats at Pro Football Reference

Paris Johnson Jr. (born July 3, 2001) is an American professional football offensive tackle for the Arizona Cardinals of the National Football League (NFL). He played college football for the Ohio State Buckeyes and was selected by the Cardinals sixth overall in the 2023 NFL draft. Johnson Jr. is the son of football player and coach Paris Johnson.

== Early life ==
Johnson was born on July 3, 2001, in Cincinnati, Ohio. He attended St. Xavier High School before transferring to Princeton High School as a senior in 2019, where he won the Anthony Muñoz Award. The top-ranked offensive tackle of the class of 2020, he chose to attend Ohio State University.

== College career ==
Johnson played in five games as a freshman in 2020, including at offensive guard due to an injury in the 2021 College Football Playoff National Championship, and started every game at right guard the following season. He moved to left tackle as a junior in 2022, where he was named a consensus All-American.

== Professional career ==
Pre-draft measurables
Height	Weight	Arm length	Hand span	Wingspan	Broad jump	Bench press
6 ft 6 3/8 in (1.99 m)	313 lb (142 kg)	36 1/8 in (0.92 m)	9 1/2 in (0.24 m)	7 ft 1 1/8 in (2.16 m)	9 ft 2 in (2.79 m)	29 reps
All values from NFL Combine

The Arizona Cardinals selected Johnson Jr. in the first round (sixth overall) of the 2023 NFL draft. The Cardinals arranged a trade in order for them to secure the ability to acquire Johnson, by agreeing to send a first (12th overall), second (34th overall), and fifth round picks (168th overall) in the 2023 NFL Draft to the Detroit Lions in exchange for their first (6th overall) and third round picks (81st overall).

As a rookie, he started in all 17 games at right tackle for the Cardinals in the 2023 season. Following the release of longtime starter D. J. Humphries, Johnson was named the Cardinals' starting left tackle.

Johnson entered the 2025 campaign as one of Arizona's starting offensive linemen. On December 27, 2025, Johnson was placed on season-ending injured reserve due to a knee injury suffered in Week 14 against the Los Angeles Rams.

On April 16, 2026, the Cardinals exercised the $19 million, fifth-year option of Johnson's rookie contract.

== Personal life ==
Paris Johnson Jr. is the son of Paris Johnson, who was selected by the Cardinals in the fifth round of the 1999 NFL draft as a safety and spent one season with them before being released. He majored in journalism at Ohio State, writing several articles for their student newspaper The Lantern before graduating in December 2022. Johnson founded a charity foundation under his name in high school; it was awarded the 2022 Armed Forces Merit Award for their work in raising more than $10,000 to assist military veterans, student-athletes, and the homeless. He speaks Mandarin Chinese and some Portuguese, having studied the former since late childhood and the latter after gaining an interest in visiting Brazil.
