= Tyreke Smith =

American football player (born 2000)

No. 57 – Kansas City Chiefs
- Position: Linebacker
- Roster status: Practice squad

Personal information
- Born: February 14, 2000 (age 26); Cleveland, Ohio, U.S.
- Listed height: 6 ft 3 in (1.91 m)
- Listed weight: 255 lb (116 kg)

Career information
- High school: Cleveland Heights (OH)
- College: Ohio State (2018–2021)
- NFL draft: 2022: 5th round, 158th overall pick

Career history
- Seattle Seahawks (2022–2023); Arizona Cardinals (2023); Seattle Seahawks (2024–2025)*; Kansas City Chiefs (2025–present)
- * Offseason or practice squad member only

Awards and highlights
- Second-team All-Big Ten (2021)

Career NFL statistics as of 2025
- Total tackles: 1
- Stats at Pro Football Reference

Tyreke Smith (born February 14, 2000) is an American professional football linebacker for the Kansas City Chiefs of the National Football League (NFL). He played college football for the Ohio State Buckeyes.

== College career ==
Smith played for Ohio State from 2018 to 2021. In college, Smith was known as a strong, quick defensive lineman with great awareness and technique. Despite being considered an injury risk over his career, Smith led the Big Ten Conference in quarterback hits, with 21 in his last two playing seasons.

== Professional career ==
Pre-draft measurables
Height	Weight	Arm length	Hand span	Wingspan	40-yard dash	10-yard split	20-yard split	20-yard shuttle	Three-cone drill	Vertical jump	Broad jump
6 ft 3 3/8 in (1.91 m)	254 lb (115 kg)	33 1/4 in (0.84 m)	10 1/4 in (0.26 m)	6 ft 8 1/2 in (2.04 m)	4.86 s	1.65 s	2.84 s	4.26 s	7.06 s	34.0 in (0.86 m)	9 ft 9 in (2.97 m)
All values from NFL Combine/Pro Day

=== Seattle Seahawks (first stint) ===
Smith was selected by the Seattle Seahawks in the fifth round (158th overall) in the 2022 NFL draft. He was placed on injured reserve on August 30, 2022.

On September 20, 2023, Smith was waived by the Seahawks and re-signed to the practice squad.

=== Arizona Cardinals ===
On December 15, 2023, Smith was signed by the Arizona Cardinals off the Seahawks practice squad. He was waived on August 27, 2024.

=== Seattle Seahawks (second stint) ===
On August 29, 2024, the Seattle Seahawks signed Smith to their practice squad. He signed a reserve/future contract on January 6, 2025. He was waived on August 26, 2025.

=== Kansas City Chiefs ===
On August 29, 2025, Smith was signed to the Kansas City Chiefs' practice squad. He was promoted to the active roster on December 24.

On August 30, 2026, Smith was waived by the Chiefs as a part of final roster cuts; he was re-signed to the team's practice squad the next day.
