= Haskell Garrett =

American football player (born 1998)

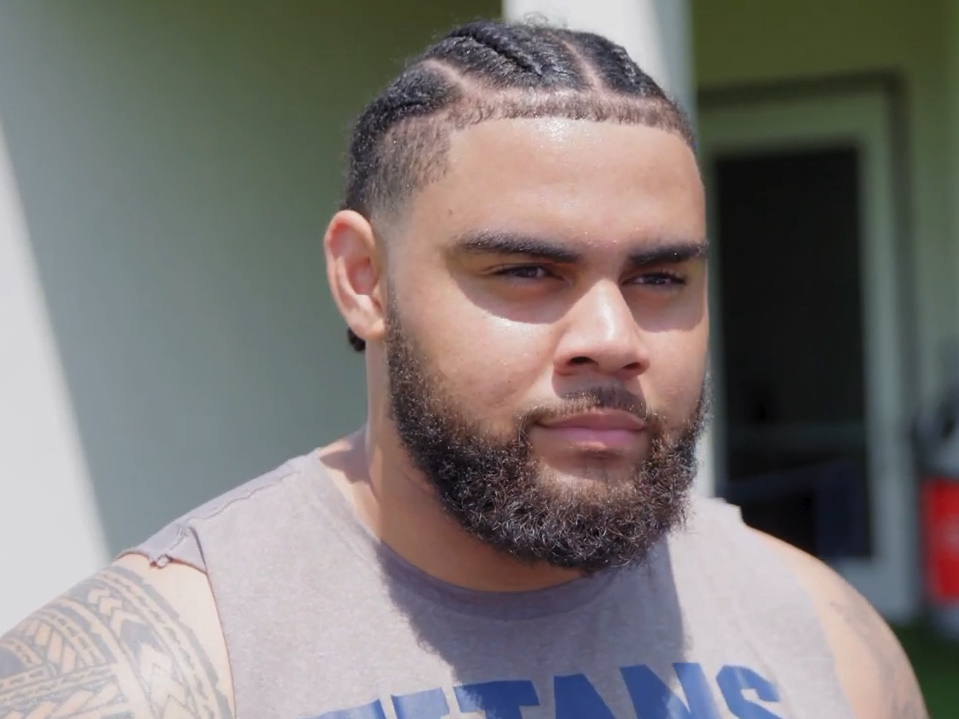
- Garrett in 2022

Profile
- Position: Defensive tackle

Personal information
- Born: May 4, 1998 (age 28); Burlington, Vermont, U.S.
- Listed height: 6 ft 2 in (1.88 m)
- Listed weight: 300 lb (136 kg)

Career information
- High school: Bishop Gorman (Summerlin, Nevada)
- College: Ohio State (2017–2021)
- NFL draft: 2022: undrafted

Career history
- Tennessee Titans (2022)*
- * Offseason or practice squad member only

Awards and highlights
- Polynesian College Football Player of the Year (2021); Second-team All-American (2020); First-team All-Big Ten (2021); Third-team All-Big Ten (2020)
- Stats at Pro Football Reference

Haskell Garrett (born May 4, 1998) is an American former professional football defensive tackle. He played college football for the Ohio State Buckeyes.

== Early life ==
Originally from Vermont, Garrett moved to Hawaii, then Nevada at age 13, after the death of his father. Garrett attended Bishop Gorman High School in Summerlin, Nevada. During his career, he had 25 sacks. Garrett played in the 2017 U. S. Army All-American Bowl. He committed to Ohio State University to play college football.

== College career ==
During his first three years at Ohio State (2017–2019), Garrett recorded 20 tackles over 33 games as a rotational defensive lineman. In August 2020, prior to his senior season, Garrett was shot in the face while attempting to break up a fight. Despite the shooting he returned to play just two months later. He was named an All-American that season by CBS. On December 27, 2021, Garrett announced that he would be opting out of the 2022 Rose Bowl and declaring for the 2022 NFL draft.

== Professional career ==
Pre-draft measurables
Height	Weight	Arm length	Hand span	Wingspan	40-yard dash	10-yard split	20-yard split	20-yard shuttle	Three-cone drill	Vertical jump	Bench press
6 ft 2 1/8 in (1.88 m)	300 lb (136 kg)	31 5/8 in (0.80 m)	9 7/8 in (0.25 m)	6 ft 6 1/8 in (1.98 m)	5.07 s	1.85 s	2.92 s	4.80 s	7.75 s	24.0 in (0.61 m)	24 reps
All values from NFL Combine/Pro Day

Garrett signed with the Tennessee Titans as an undrafted free agent on May 13, 2022. He was released on August 16, 2022.
