= Dawand Jones =

American football player (born 2001)

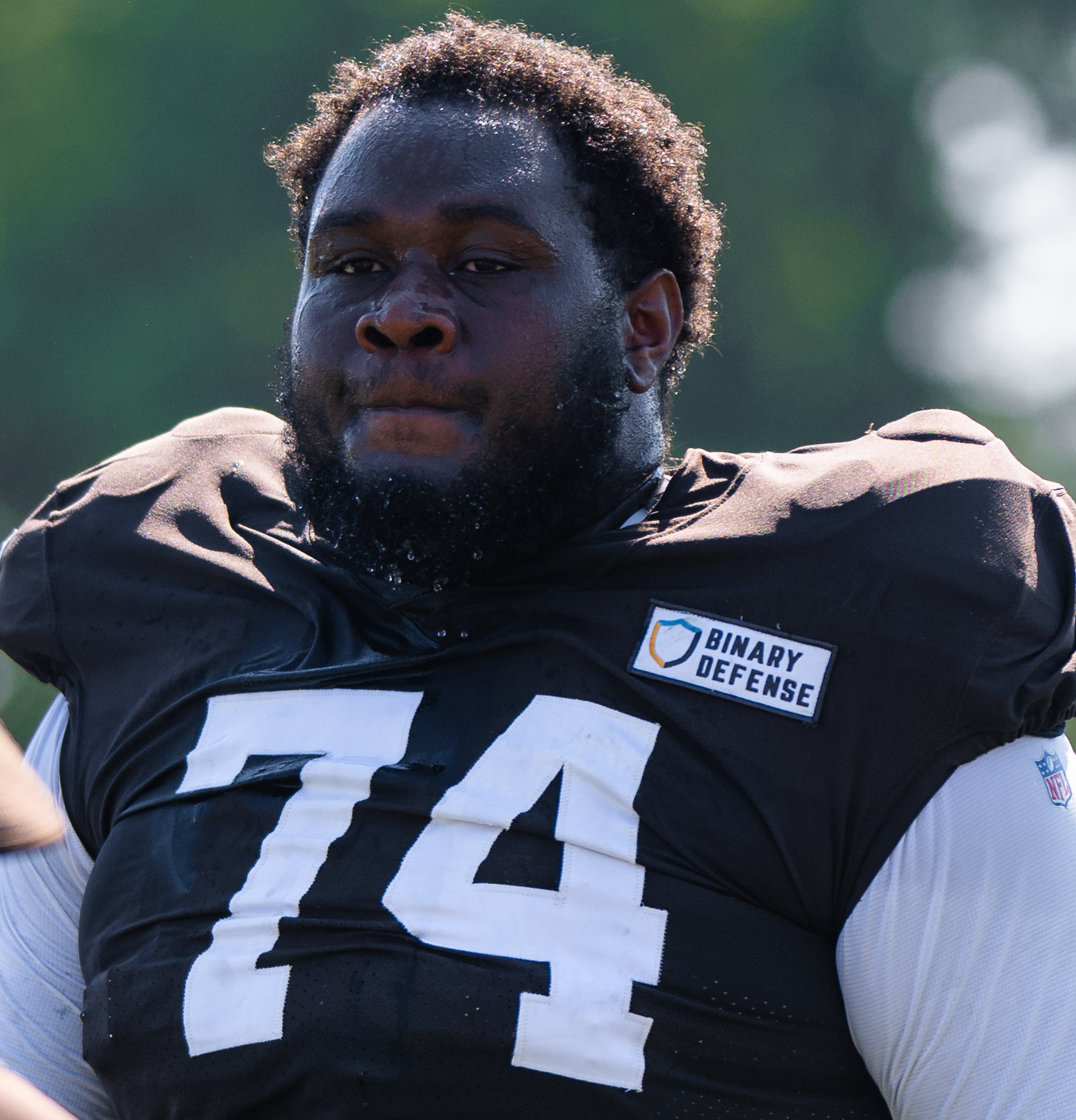
- Jones with the Cleveland Browns in 2023

No. 79 – Cleveland Browns
- Position: Offensive tackle
- Roster status: Active

Personal information
- Born: August 6, 2001 (age 25); Indianapolis, Indiana, U.S.
- Listed height: 6 ft 8 in (2.03 m)
- Listed weight: 374 lb (170 kg)

Career information
- High school: Ben Davis (Indianapolis)
- College: Ohio State (2019–2022)
- NFL draft: 2023: 4th round, 111th overall pick

Career history
- Cleveland Browns (2023–present)

Awards and highlights
- PFWA All-Rookie Team (2023); First-team All-American (2022); 2× second-team All-Big Ten (2021, 2022)

Career NFL statistics as of 2025
- Games played: 24
- Games started: 20
- Stats at Pro Football Reference

Dawand Jones (born August 6, 2001) is an American professional football offensive tackle for the Cleveland Browns of the National Football League (NFL). He played college football for the Ohio State Buckeyes.

== Early life ==
Jones attended Ben Davis High School in Indianapolis where he played football and basketball and held Division I offers in both sports. A three-star prospect in the former, Jones committed to play college football at Ohio State University.

== College career ==
Jones appeared in nine games as a true freshman in 2019, although did not start any. In 2020, he appeared in six of the team's eight games during the COVID shortened season. Jones would emerge as a starter in 2021, starting every game at right tackle for the Buckeyes. At the conclusion of his junior season, Jones was named to the second team All-Big 10 team. On January 17, 2022, Jones announced that he would return to Ohio State for his senior season, forgoing the 2022 NFL draft.

== Professional career ==
Pre-draft measurables
Height	Weight	Arm length	Hand span	Wingspan	40-yard dash	10-yard split	20-yard split
6 ft 8 1/4 in (2.04 m)	374 lb (170 kg)	36 3/8 in (0.92 m)	11 5/8 in (0.30 m)	7 ft 3 7/8 in (2.23 m)	5.35 s	1.92 s	3.05 s
All values from NFL Combine

=== 2023 season ===
Jones was selected by the Cleveland Browns in the fourth round, 111th overall, of the 2023 NFL draft. Following a season-ending injury to Jack Conklin, Jones took over as the starting right tackle in Week 2. He started nine of the next 11 games before being placed on injured reserve on December 11, 2023, with a knee injury. He was named to the PFWA All-Rookie Team.

=== 2024 season ===
Jones made 10 appearances (8 starts) for Cleveland in 2024. On November 17, 2024, it was announced that Jones would undergo season–ending surgery to repair a fractured ankle he suffered in Week 11.

=== 2025 season ===
On February 20, 2025, it was announced that Jones had undergone arthroscopic knee surgery to address a lingering issue he had played through during the 2024 season. He began the 2025 season as one of Cleveland's starting offensive tackles. In Week 3 against the Green Bay Packers, Jones suffered a knee injury; it was announced he would require season-ending surgery on September 22.
