= Ronnie Hickman =

American football player (born 2001)

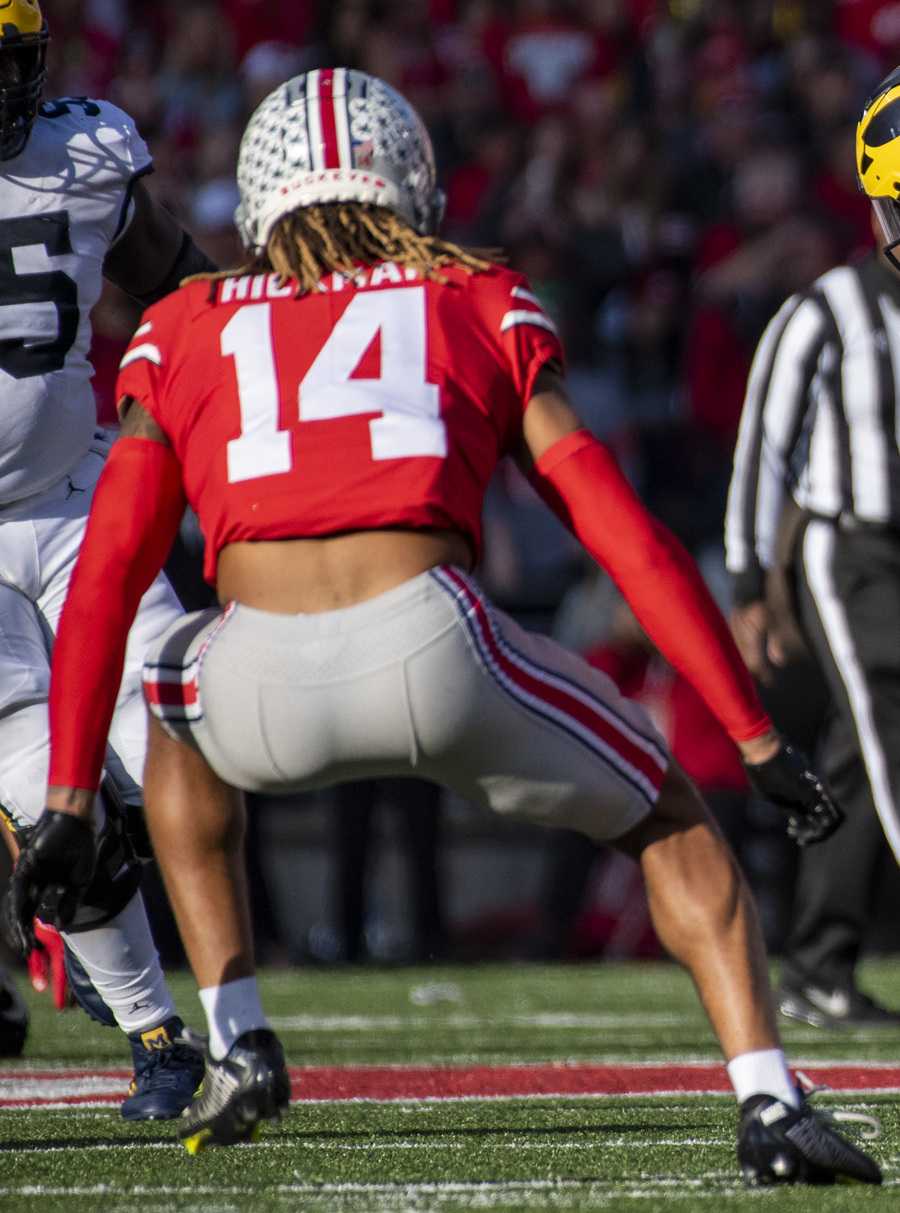
- Hickman with the Ohio State Buckeyes in 2022

No. 33 – Cleveland Browns
- Position: Safety
- Roster status: Active

Personal information
- Born: October 11, 2001 (age 25); Manhattan, New York, U.S.
- Listed height: 6 ft 1 in (1.85 m)
- Listed weight: 209 lb (95 kg)

Career information
- High school: DePaul Catholic (Wayne, New Jersey)
- College: Ohio State (2019–2022)
- NFL draft: 2023: undrafted

Career history
- Cleveland Browns (2023–present)

Awards and highlights
- Second-team All-Big Ten (2021); Third-team All-Big Ten (2022)

Career NFL statistics as of 2025
- Total tackles: 173
- Interceptions: 3
- Interception yards: 61
- Pass deflections: 11
- Fumble recoveries: 1
- Defensive touchdowns: 1
- Stats at Pro Football Reference

Ronnie Hickman Jr. (born October 11, 2001) is an American professional football safety for the Cleveland Browns of the National Football League (NFL). He played college football for the Ohio State Buckeyes and was signed as an undrafted free agent by the Browns after the 2023 NFL draft.

== Early life ==
Raised in South Orange, New Jersey, Hickman attended DePaul Catholic High School in Wayne, New Jersey. He played safety and wide receiver in high school. Hickman was selected to play in the 2019 All-American Bowl. He committed to Ohio State University to play college football.

Prior to committing to Ohio State, Hickman was an All-American lacrosse player, and he originally committed to Rutgers University for lacrosse.

== College career ==
Hickman played at Ohio State from 2019 to 2022. After redshirting in 2019 to recover from an injury he suffered his senior year in high school, he played in five games in 2020 on special teams, finishing with five tackles. In 2021, he started all 13 games recording 99 tackles, two interceptions, a sack and a touchdown. In 2022, he started 13 games and had 53 tackles and an interception. After the season, Hickman entered the 2023 NFL draft.

== Professional career ==
Pre-draft measurables
Height	Weight	Arm length	Hand span	Wingspan
6 ft 0 1/2 in (1.84 m)	203 lb (92 kg)	33 in (0.84 m)	9 3/8 in (0.24 m)	6 ft 6 in (1.98 m)
All values from NFL Combine

Hickman signed with the Cleveland Browns as an undrafted free agent on May 12, 2023. On August 29, the Browns announced that he had made the team's initial 53-man roster. During the Browns' Week 17 victory over the New York Jets, Hickman recorded his first career interception off quarterback Trevor Siemian and returned it 30 yards for his first NFL touchdown.

In 2025, Hickman emerged as a full time starter and recorded a career-high 103 total tackles and two interceptions.

== NFL career statistics ==
Legend
**Bold**	Career high

=== Regular season ===
Year	Team	Games		Tackles					Interceptions						Fumbles				
Year	Team	GP	GS	Cmb	Solo	Ast	Sck	TFL	Int	Yds	Avg	Lng	TD	PD	FF	Fum	FR	Yds	TD
2023	CLE	10	4	25	17	8	0.0	0	1	30	**30.0**	**30**	**1**	3	0	0	0	0	0
2024	CLE	14	5	45	26	19	0.0	**1**	0	0	0.0	0	0	1	0	0	**1**	0	0
2025	CLE	17	17	**103**	**51**	**52**	0.0	**1**	**2**	**31**	15.5	16	0	**7**	0	0	0	0	0
Career		41	26	173	94	79	0.0	2	3	61	20.3	30	1	11	0	0	1	0	0

=== Postseason ===
Year	Team	Games		Tackles					Interceptions						Fumbles				
Year	Team	GP	GS	Cmb	Solo	Ast	Sck	TFL	Int	Yds	Avg	Lng	TD	PD	FF	Fum	FR	Yds	TD
2023	CLE	1	0	0	0	0	0.0	0	0	0	0.0	0	0	0	0	0	0	0	0
Career		0	0	0	0	0	0.0	0	0	0	0.0	0	0	0	0	0	0	0	0
