= Nicholas Petit-Frere =

American football player (born 1999)

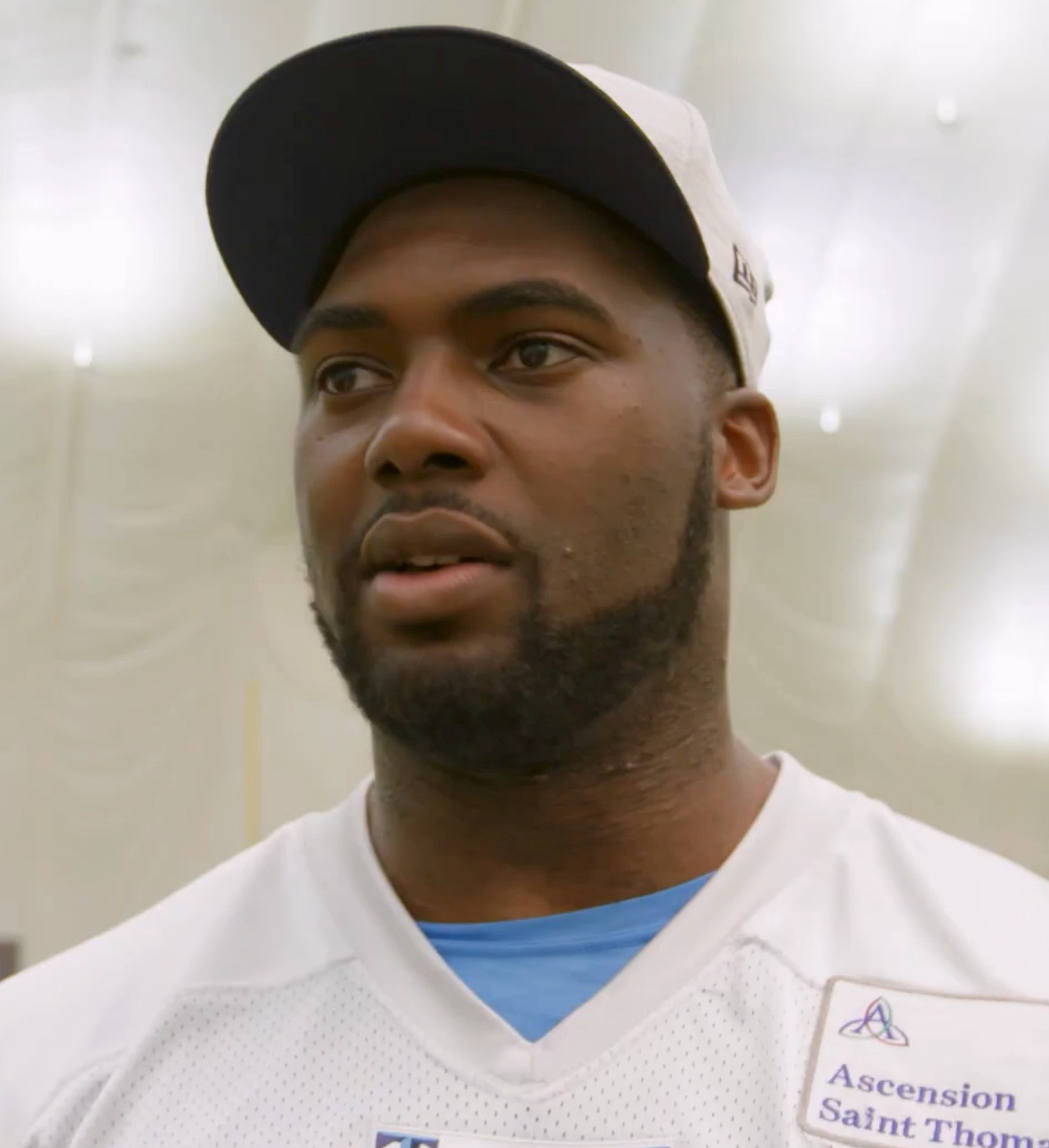
- Petit-Frere with the Tennessee Titans in 2022

Profile
- Position: Offensive tackle

Personal information
- Born: September 15, 1999 (age 27); Port St. Lucie, Florida, U.S.
- Listed height: 6 ft 5 in (1.96 m)
- Listed weight: 315 lb (143 kg)

Career information
- High school: Berkeley Preparatory (Tampa, Florida)
- College: Ohio State (2018–2021)
- NFL draft: 2022: 3rd round, 69th overall pick

Career history
- Tennessee Titans (2022–2024); San Francisco 49ers (2025)*; Washington Commanders (2026)*
- * Offseason or practice squad member only

Awards and highlights
- Second-team All-American (2021); Second-team All Big Ten (2020)

Career NFL statistics as of 2025
- Games played: 34
- Games started: 28
- Stats at Pro Football Reference

Nicholas Petit-Frere (born September 15, 1999) is an American professional football offensive tackle, He played college football for the Ohio State Buckeyes and was selected by the Tennessee Titans in the third round of the 2022 NFL draft.

== Early life ==
Petit-Frere grew up in Tampa, Florida, and attended Berkeley Preparatory School, where he played football and basketball. He is of Haitian descent through his father. Petit-Frere was considered a five-star recruit and committed to play college football at Ohio State after considering offers from Alabama and Florida.

== College career ==
Petit-Frere redshirted his true freshman season. As a redshirt freshman, he played in all 14 of Ohio State's games with one start. As a redshirt sophomore, Petit-Frere was named second-team All-Big Ten after starting all seven of Ohio State's games in the team's COVID-19-shortened 2020 season. On December 27, 2021, Petit-Frere announced that he would be opting out of the 2022 Rose Bowl and declaring for the 2022 NFL draft.

== Professional career ==
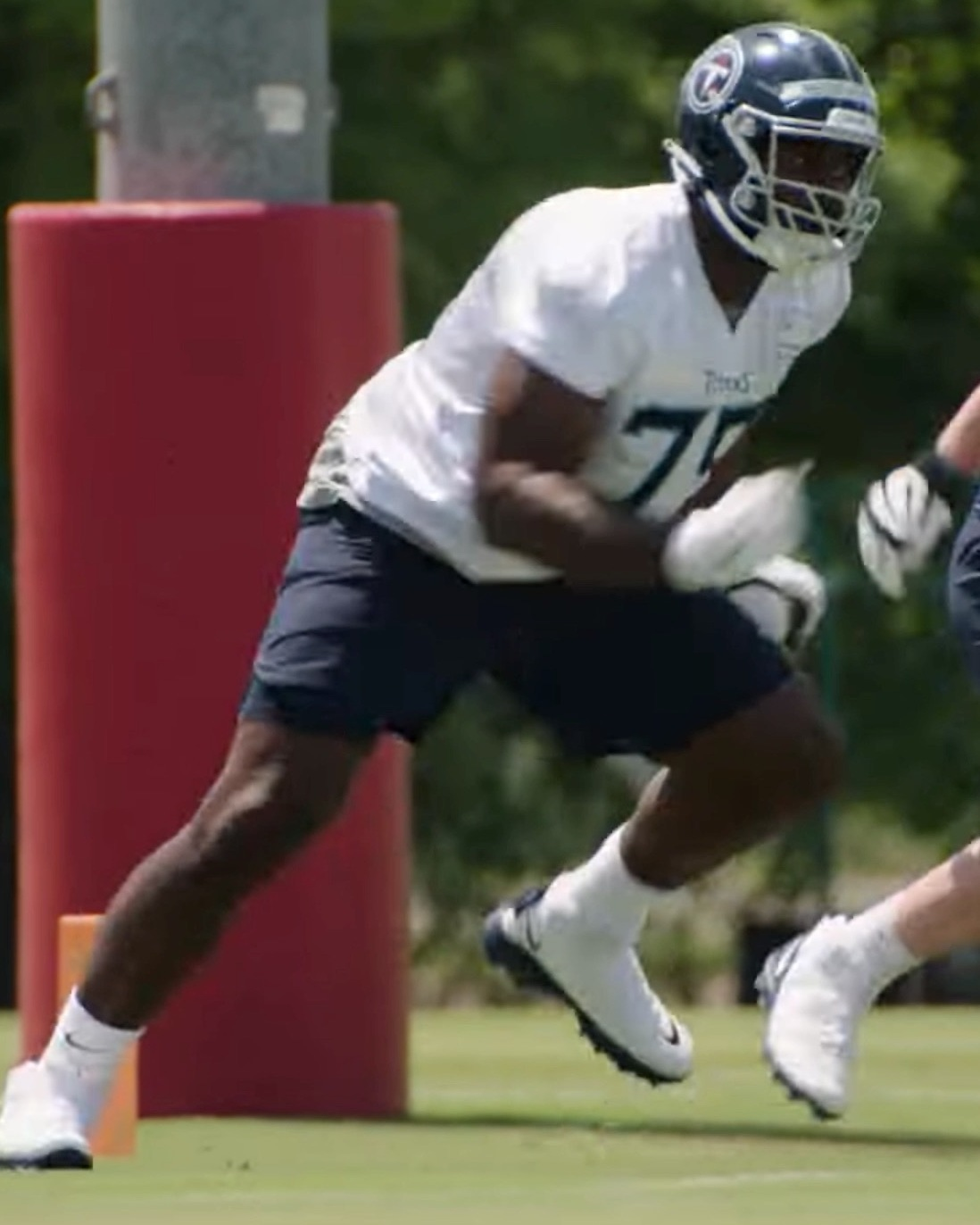
Petit-Frere practicing with the Tennessee Titans, 2022

Pre-draft measurables
Height	Weight	Arm length	Hand span	Wingspan	40-yard dash	10-yard split	20-yard split	20-yard shuttle	Three-cone drill	Vertical jump	Broad jump	Bench press
6 ft 5 1/8 in (1.96 m)	316 lb (143 kg)	33 5/8 in (0.85 m)	10 3/4 in (0.27 m)	6 ft 9 3/4 in (2.08 m)	5.14 s	1.77 s	2.99 s	4.85 s	7.85 s	30.5 in (0.77 m)	8 ft 7 in (2.62 m)	24 reps
All values from NFL Combine/Pro Day

=== Tennessee Titans ===
Petit-Frere was drafted in the third round, 69th overall, of the 2022 NFL draft by the Tennessee Titans.

Heading into his first training camp in the NFL, Nicholas Petit-Frere was the starting right tackle opposite of starting left tackle Taylor Lewan. Petit-Frere made his first career start and NFL debut in the Titans' Week 1 loss to the New York Giants. He continued to hold down the starting right tackle job for the rest of the season, missing one game in Week 17 due to an ankle injury. Overall, Petit-Frere played in 16 games (16 starts) in his rookie season and appeared in 97% of the offensive snaps that year, allowing five sacks and committing eight penalties. Pro Football Focus gave him a 52.3 grade for the season.

In advance of the 2023 season, Petit-Frere was suspended for six games by the NFL for violating the league's gambling policy. He returned after Week 6 to play three games, but was placed on injured reserve on November 11, 2023.

Petit-Frere returned from injury to begin the 2024 season at starting right tackle, but was moved to third string behind Leroy Watson and Jaelyn Duncan on Week 6 after allowing too many pressures. Petit-Frere returned to the starting position in Week 11 after Watson and Duncan both sustained season-ending injuries. In total, he appeared in 15 games during the season, including ten starts, and appearing in 65% of offensive snaps.

On April 17, 2025, Petit-Frere was waived by the Titans.

=== San Francisco 49ers ===
On May 9, 2025, the San Francisco 49ers signed Petit-Frere to a one-year contract. On June 3, the 49ers waived Petit-Frere.

=== Washington Commanders ===
On August 8, 2026, Petit-Frere signed with the Washington Commanders. On August 30, he was waived by Washington as a part of final roster cuts before the start of the regular season.
