= TreVeyon Henderson =

American football player (born 2002)

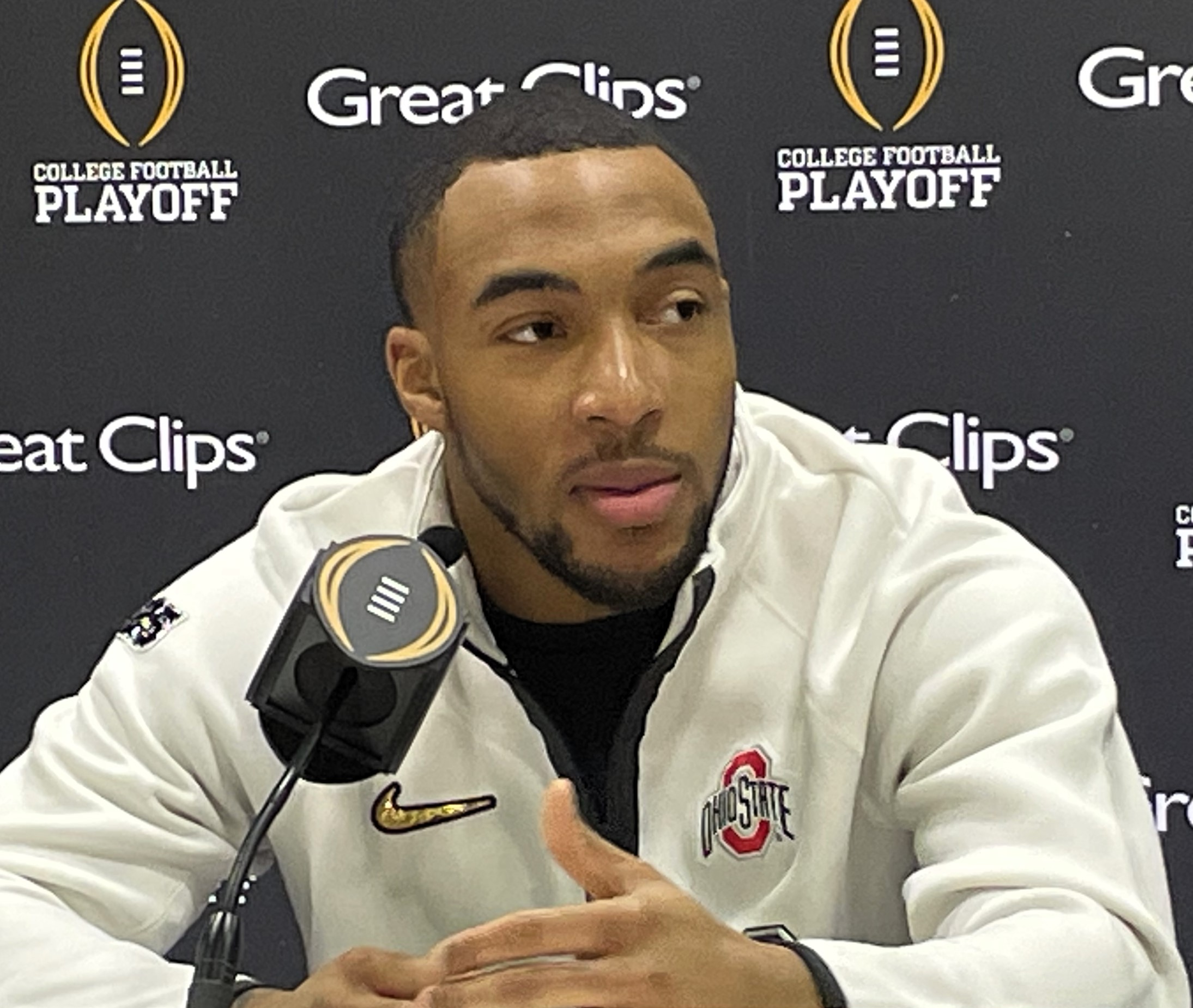
- Henderson with the Ohio State Buckeyes in 2025

No. 32 – New England Patriots
- Positions: Running back, kickoff returner
- Roster status: Injured reserve

Personal information
- Born: October 22, 2002 (age 24); Hopewell, Virginia, U.S.
- Listed height: 5 ft 10 in (1.78 m)
- Listed weight: 202 lb (92 kg)

Career information
- High school: Hopewell (VA)
- College: Ohio State (2021–2024)
- NFL draft: 2025: 2nd round, 38th overall pick

Career history
- New England Patriots (2025–present)

Awards and highlights
- PFWA All-Rookie Team (2025); CFP national champion (2024); First-team All-Big Ten (2023); Second-team All-Big Ten (2021); Third-team All-Big Ten (2024)

Career NFL statistics as of Week 7, 2026
- Rushing yards: 1,114
- Rushing average: 4.8
- Rushing touchdowns: 10
- Receptions: 40
- Receiving yards: 266
- Receiving touchdowns: 1
- Return yards: 209
- Stats at Pro Football Reference

TreVeyon Henderson (born October 22, 2002) is an American professional football running back and kickoff returner for the New England Patriots of the National Football League (NFL). He played college football for the Ohio State Buckeyes, winning a national championship in 2025. Henderson was selected by the Patriots in the second round of the 2025 NFL draft.

== Early life ==
Henderson was born on October 22, 2002, in Hopewell, Virginia. He attended and played football at Hopewell High School, where he rushed for over 4,000 yards with 50 touchdowns. Henderson was named the 2019–2020 Virginia Gatorade Football Player of the Year. He did not play his senior season due to Virginia moving its fall sports season to the spring as a result of COVID-19. A five star recruit ranked as the top running back prospect in his class, Henderson committed to play college football at Ohio State over offers from Georgia, Michigan and Texas. In high school, Henderson was a straight-A student and graduated with a 4.0 GPA.

== College career ==
Henderson enrolled at Ohio State in January 2021. He made his Ohio State debut against Minnesota in a 45–31 win. In the game, Henderson had two carries for 15 yards and one catch for 70 yards and a touchdown. In his third game, Henderson broke Archie Griffin’s freshman single-game rushing record with 277 yards on 24 carries and three touchdowns. Overall, it was the third-most yards by an Ohio State running back in a game. For his performance, Henderson earned Big Ten Offensive Player of the Week and Freshman of the Week. During Week 13 against the Michigan Wolverines, Henderson broke Ohio State's freshman record for touchdowns from scrimmage with 19. He also earned First-Team All-Big Ten after a 926 yard, 11 touchdown season on the ground and 229 yards through the air. Henderson graduated from Ohio State with a degree in sport industry.

== Professional career ==
Pre-draft measurables
Height	Weight	Arm length	Hand span	Wingspan	40-yard dash	10-yard split	20-yard split	Vertical jump	Broad jump
5 ft 10 1/8 in (1.78 m)	202 lb (92 kg)	30 3/4 in (0.78 m)	9 1/2 in (0.24 m)	6 ft 4 1/8 in (1.93 m)	4.43 s	1.52 s	2.64 s	38.5 in (0.98 m)	10 ft 8 in (3.25 m)
All values from NFL Combine

Henderson was selected by the New England Patriots in the second round as the 38th overall pick in the 2025 NFL draft, two picks behind his OSU running mate Quinshon Judkins. He inked his rookie contract on July 18, 2025, reported to be a four year deal worth $11.143 million, fully guaranteed.

He scored his first NFL touchdown at in the second quarter in the 42–13 win over the Carolina Panthers in Week 4. He finished the game with 32 rushing yards on seven carries with two receptions for 14 yards. In Week 10 against the Tampa Bay Buccaneers, Henderson scored two touchdowns, a 55-yard run in the third quarter, and a 69-yard run in the fourth quarter. He became the first Patriots player to record multiple 50+ yard runs in a single game since Laurence Maroney in 2007. He finished the game rushing for 147 yards on 14 carries in the 28–23 win. In Week 11 against the New York Jets, Henderson became the third Patriots rookie to score three touchdowns in a single game, joining Rob Gronkowski in 2010 and Sony Michel in 2018. He finished the game with 19 carries for 62 yards with two touchdowns and five receptions for 31 yards with one touchdown in the 27–14 win, giving him a total of five touchdowns in a five-day span. Henderson was also named the AFC Offensive Player of the Month for November. In a loss to the Buffalo Bills in Week 15, he had two more touchdowns of 50+ yards, tying an NFL rookie record with four such touchdown runs and an NFL career record with two such games. He finished the season with 911 rushing yards and nine touchdowns, along with 35 catches for 221 yards and one touchdown through 17 games and four starts, helping the Patriots to a 14–3 record and the 2nd seed in the AFC. He had 45 scrimmage yards in Super Bowl LX, a 29–13 loss to the Seattle Seahawks.

== Career statistics ==
Legend
**Bold**	Career high

=== NFL ===
==== Regular season ====
Year	Team	Games		Rushing					Receiving					Kick return					Fumbles	
Year	Team	GP	GS	Att	Yds	Avg	Lng	TD	Rec	Yds	Avg	Lng	TD	Ret	Yds	Avg	Lng	TD	Fum	Lost
2025	NE	17	4	**180**	**911**	**5.1**	**69**	**9**	**35**	**221**	6.3	**19**	**1**	**9**	**209**	**23.2**	**28**	0	**1**	**1**
2026	NE	6	0	52	203	3.9	39	1	5	45	**9.0**	12	0	0	0	0.0	0	0	0	0
Career		23	4	232	1,114	4.8	69	10	40	266	6.7	19	1	9	209	23.2	28	0	1	1

==== Postseason ====
Year	Team	Games		Rushing					Receiving					Kick return					Fumbles	
Year	Team	GP	GS	Att	Yds	Avg	Lng	TD	Rec	Yds	Avg	Lng	TD	Ret	Yds	Avg	Lng	TD	Fum	Lost
2025	NE	4	1	30	76	2.5	15	0	5	33	6.6	24	0	1	38	38.0	38	0	0	0

=== College ===
Season	Games		Rushing				Receiving			
Season	GP	GS	Att	Yds	Avg	TD	Rec	Yds	Avg	TD
2021	13	11	**183**	**1,248**	6.8	**15**	**27**	**312**	11.6	**4**
2022	8	8	107	571	5.3	6	4	28	7.0	1
2023	10	10	156	926	5.9	11	19	229	**12.1**	0
2024	16	9	144	1,016	**7.1**	10	**27**	284	10.5	1
Career	47	37	590	3,761	6.4	42	77	853	11.1	6

== Personal life ==
Henderson is the son of Trenton Henderson and Lakeesha Hayes.

He is a devout Christian and has spoken publicly about how his faith informs his life and career. While at Ohio State, Henderson was featured in coverage about a campus religious revival in which he and other players participated, and in interviews he discussed the role of faith in his decision‑making as a student‑athlete.

Henderson has also participated in community outreach events and youth programs where he has discussed his faith and encouraged young people to persevere through challenges. These appearances have included visits to local schools and faith‑based community gatherings. Coverage of these appearances has focused on his role as a young leader and role model in both athletics and personal development.

On September 10, 2025, Henderson announced his engagement to his longtime girlfriend. On February 2, 2026, he announced that he and his fiancée had recently been married.

In March 2026, Henderson posted a Bible verse on social media in response to the release of NBA player Jaden Ivey by the Chicago Bulls. He quoted Matthew 5:10, “Blessed are those who are persecuted for righteousness’ sake, for theirs is the kingdom of heaven,” on his X account following Ivey’s release. Ivey had been waived by the team following public remarks in which he spoke about his religious beliefs in a critical response to the Bulls' participation in Pride Month events, comments that was described as "conduct detrimental to the team."
