= Denzel Burke =

American football player (born 2002)

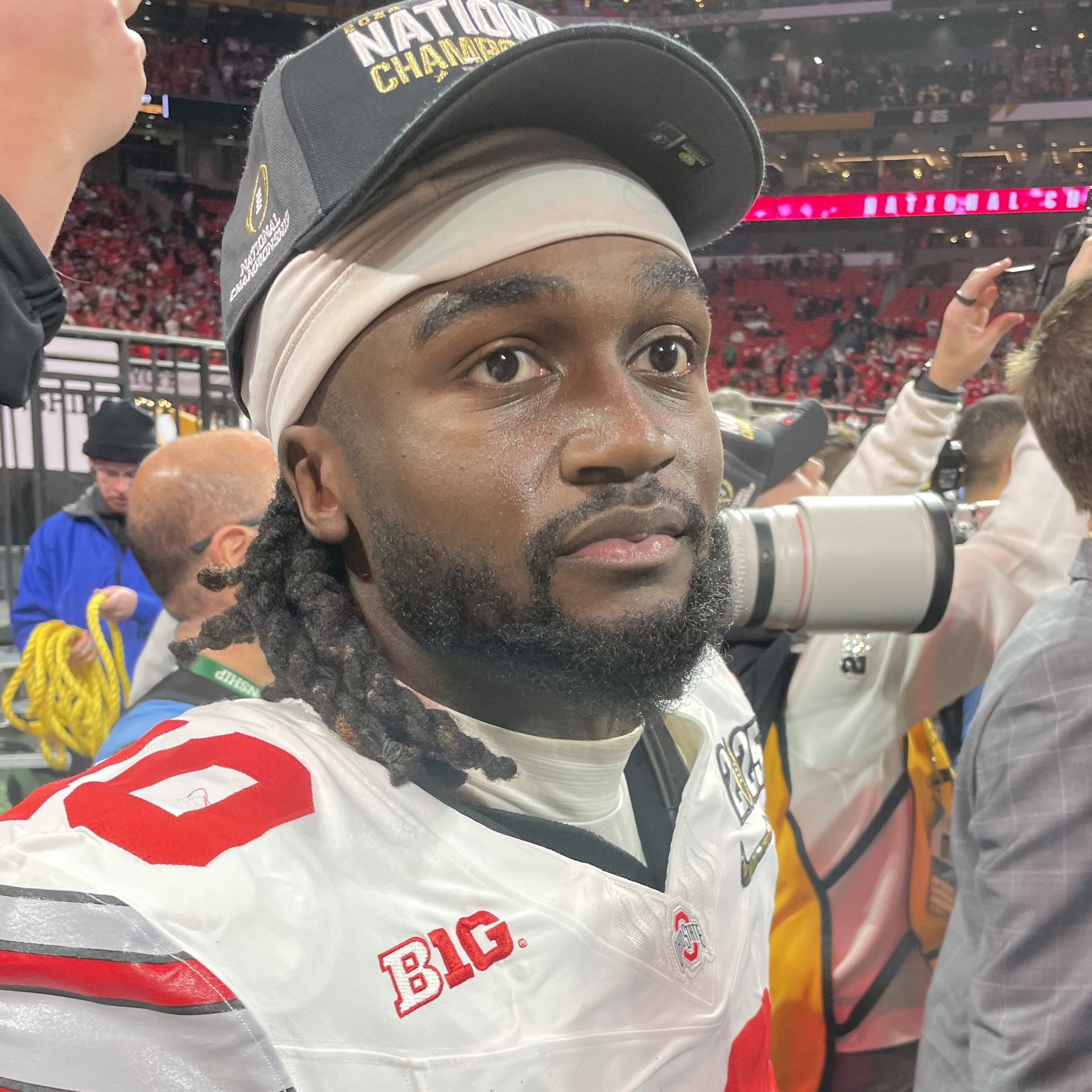
- Burke after 2025 CFP National Championship.

No. 29 – Arizona Cardinals
- Position: Cornerback
- Roster status: Active

Personal information
- Born: November 10, 2002 (age 23)
- Listed height: 5 ft 11 in (1.80 m)
- Listed weight: 190 lb (86 kg)

Career information
- High school: Saguaro (Scottsdale, Arizona)
- College: Ohio State (2021–2024)
- NFL draft: 2025: 5th round, 174th overall pick

Career history
- Arizona Cardinals (2025–present)

Career NFL statistics as of Week 5, 2026
- Tackles: 64
- Pass deflections: 14
- Interceptions: 4
- Stats at Pro Football Reference

Denzel Burke (born November 10, 2002) is an American professional football cornerback for the Arizona Cardinals of the National Football League (NFL). He played college football for the Ohio State Buckeyes and was selected by the Cardinals in the fifth round of the 2025 NFL draft.

== Early life ==
Burke originally attended Brophy College Preparatory in Phoenix, Arizona before transferring to Saguaro High School in Scottsdale, Arizona for his senior year. He played defensive back and wide receiver in high school. He played in only one game his senior year due to injury. Burke committed to Ohio State University to play college football.

== College career ==
Burke started all 13 games his true freshman year at Ohio State in 2021. He finished the year with 35 tackles, one interception and one touchdown.

He won the 2025 College Football Playoff National Championship with Ohio State.

== Professional career ==
Pre-draft measurables
Height	Weight	Arm length	Hand span	Wingspan	40-yard dash	10-yard split	20-yard split
5 ft 11 1/4 in (1.81 m)	186 lb (84 kg)	31 3/8 in (0.80 m)	8 3/4 in (0.22 m)	6 ft 5 1/8 in (1.96 m)	4.48 s	1.50 s	2.61 s
All values from NFL Combine

Burke was selected by the Arizona Cardinals in the fifth round of the 2025 NFL draft with the 174th overall pick.

== NFL career statistics ==
=== Regular season ===
Year	Team	Games		Tackles					Interceptions						Fumbles				
Year	Team	GP	GS	Cmb	Solo	Ast	Sck	TFL	Int	Yds	Avg	Lng	TD	PD	FF	Fmb	FR	Yds	TD
2025	ARI	17	8	49	34	15	0.0	2	3	20	6.7	16	0	11	0	0	0	0	0
2026	ARI	5	3	15	10	5	0.0	0	1	0	0.0	0	0	3	0	0	0	0	0
Career		22	11	64	44	20	0.0	2	4	20	6.7	16	0	14	0	0	0	0	0
