= 2022 Rose Bowl =

Postseason college football bowl game

2022 Rose Bowl presented by Capital One Venture X
- CFP New Year's Six; 108th Rose Bowl Game
Utah Utes	Ohio State Buckeyes
(10–3)	(10–2)
Pac-12	Big Ten
45	48
Head coach: Kyle Whittingham	Head coach: Ryan Day
AP / Coaches / CFP; 10 / 11 / 11	AP / Coaches / CFP; 7 / 7 / 6
	1	2	3	4	Total
Utah	14	21	3	7	45
Ohio State	0	21	10	17	48
- Date: January 1, 2022
- Season: 2021
- Stadium: Rose Bowl
- Location: Pasadena, California
- MVP: Jaxon Smith-Njigba (WR, Ohio State)
- Favorite: Ohio State by 6.5
- Referee: Jason Autrey (SEC)
- Halftime show: The Ohio State University Marching Band, and The University of Utah Marching Band
- Attendance: 87,842

United States TV coverage
- Network: ESPN; ESPN Radio
- Announcers: ESPN: Chris Fowler (play-by-play), Kirk Herbstreit (analyst), Holly Rowe and Tiffany Blackmon (sidelines); ESPN Radio: Tom Hart (play-by-play), Jordan Rodgers (color) and Cole Cubelic (sideline)
- Nielsen ratings: 16.6 million viewers

International TV coverage
- Network: ESPN Brasil
- Announcers: Matheus Suman (play-by-play) and Antony Curti (analyst)

The 2022 Rose Bowl was a college football bowl game played on January 1, 2022, with kickoff at 5:13 p.m. EST (2:13 p.m. local PST) and televised on ESPN. It was the 108th edition of the Rose Bowl Game, and was one of the 2021–22 bowl games concluding the 2021 FBS football season. Sponsored by Capital One Venture X, the game was officially known as the Rose Bowl Game presented by Capital One Venture X.

The game saw Ohio State overcoming a 14-point deficit over Utah late in the 2nd quarter to win 48-45, on a 19-yard field goal by Noah Ruggles.

The game was organized by the Pasadena Tournament of Roses Association and was preceded by the Rose Parade in the morning. Actor LeVar Burton served as grand marshal of the Rose Parade. The theme was "Dream. Believe. Achieve." The winner of the game was awarded with the Leishman Trophy.

== Teams ==
Consistent with conference tie-ins, the game was played between Big Ten Conference representative Ohio State and Pac-12 Conference champion Utah. The teams were officially welcomed to Southern California at Disneyland on December 27.

This marked the second meeting between the teams; they first met on September 27, 1986, at Ohio Stadium where Ohio State defeated Utah, 64–6.

=== Ohio State Buckeyes ===
The Buckeyes, the co-champions of the Big Ten Conference East Division, made their 16th trip to Pasadena to compete in a Rose Bowl Game. Ohio State finished their regular season with an overall 10–2 record, 8–1 in Big Ten games. Their losses came to Oregon in the second week of the season, and to Michigan at the end of the season. The loss to Michigan dropped the Buckeyes out of a spot in the College Football Playoff. Ohio State defeated three ranked teams during the regular season: Penn State, Purdue, and Michigan State. Quarterback C.J. Stroud placed fourth in the annual Heisman Trophy race.

=== Utah Utes ===
Winners of the Pac-12 championship, this was the first Rose Bowl Game for the Utes. Utah finished their regular season with a 9–3 overall record, 8–1 in Pac-12 play. Their losses came to BYU, San Diego State, and Oregon State. The Utes then faced Oregon in the Pac-12 Championship Game, a rematch between the teams. Utah had defeated Oregon on November 20 by a 38–7 score, and defeated them again for the Pac-12 title, 38–10. The Utes entered the Rose Bowl with an overall 10–3 record.

== Game summary ==
2022 Rose Bowl Game presented by Capital One Venture X

Quarter	1	2	3	4	Total
No. 11 Utah	14	21	3	7	45
No. 6 Ohio State	0	21	10	17	48

at Rose Bowl • Pasadena, California

- Date: Saturday, January 1, 2022
- Game time: 2:00 p.m. PST
- Game weather: Sunny • Temperature: 60 °F (16 °C) • Wind: NE 2 mph (3.2 km/h)
- Game attendance: 87,842
- Referee: Jason Autrey
- TV announcers (ESPN): Chris Fowler (play-by-play), Kirk Herbstreit (analyst), Holly Rowe and Tiffany Blackmon (sidelines)
- Box score

Scoring summary

Quarter	Time	Drive			Team	Scoring information	Score	
Quarter	Time	Plays	Yards	TOP	Team	Scoring information	Utah	Ohio State
1	9:29	5	56	1:37	Utah	Britain Covey 19-yard touchdown reception from Cameron Rising, Jadon Redding kick good	7	0
1	3:28	8	67	4:47	Utah	Micah Bernard 12-yard touchdown reception from Cameron Rising, Jadon Redding kick good	14	0
2	14:17	10	76	4:11	Ohio State	Marvin Harrison Jr. 25-yard touchdown reception from C. J. Stroud, Noah Ruggles kick good	14	7
2	9:07	9	79	5:10	Utah	Tavion Thomas 6-yard touchdown run, Jadon Redding kick good	21	7
2	8:32	2	60	0:35	Ohio State	Jaxon Smith-Njigba 50-yard touchdown reception from C. J. Stroud, Noah Ruggles kick good	21	14
2	8:17				Utah	Britain Covey 97-yard kickoff return for touchdown, Jadon Redding kick good	28	14
2	8:02	1	52	0:15	Ohio State	Jaxon Smith-Njigba 52-yard touchdown reception from C. J. Stroud, Noah Ruggles kick good	28	21
2	6:24	4	71	1:38	Utah	Cameron Rising 62-yard touchdown run, Jadon Redding kick good	35	21
3	11:20	2	11	0:52	Ohio State	Marvin Harrison Jr. 8-yard touchdown reception from C. J. Stroud, Noah Ruggles kick good	35	28
3	7:10	8	59	4:10	Utah	24-yard field goal by Jadon Redding	38	28
3	2:53	11	76	4:06	Ohio State	31-yard field goal by Noah Ruggles	38	31
4	10:12	7	71	3:41	Ohio State	Marvin Harrison Jr. 5-yard touchdown reception from C. J. Stroud, Noah Ruggles kick good	38	38
4	4:22	9	85	3:57	Ohio State	Jaxon Smith-Njigba 30-yard touchdown reception from C. J. Stroud, Noah Ruggles kick good	38	45
4	1:54	6	57	2:20	Utah	Dalton Kincaid 15-yard touchdown reception from Bryson Barnes, Jadon Redding kick good	45	45
4	0:09	7	56	1:45	Ohio State	19-yard field goal by Noah Ruggles	45	48
"TOP" = time of possession. For other American football terms, see Glossary of American football.								

=== Statistics ===
Statistics	UTAH	OSU
First downs	25	29
Plays–yards	68–463	67–683
Rushes–yards	44-226	20-110
Passing yards	237	573
Passing: comp–att–int	19-24-0	37-47-1
Turnovers		
Time of possession	34:17	25:52

Team	Category	Player	Statistics
Utah	Passing	Cameron Rising	17/22, 214 yards, 2 TD
Utah	Rushing	Cameron Rising	11 carries, 92 yards, 1 TD
Utah	Receiving	Brant Kuithe	6 receptions, 77 yards
Ohio State	Passing	C. J. Stroud	37/46, 573 yards, 6 TD, 1 INT
Ohio State	Rushing	TreVeyon Henderson	17 carries, 83 yards
Ohio State	Receiving	Jaxon Smith-Njigba	15 receptions, 347 yards, 3 TD

== Game highlights ==
The game featured the biggest plays (i.e., plays over 30 yards) in a Rose Bowl. Wide receiver Jaxon Smith-Njigba set school, all-Bowls, and FBS receiving records with 347 yards on 15 receptions (23.13 yards per catch average). Quarterback C.J. Stroud set a new school and Rose Bowl record with 573 passing yards (no sacks), and a Rose Bowl record six passing touchdowns. The Buckeyes' 683 total yards were a new school record as well as a record for the program in any bowl. Both teams scored 56 points combined by halftime, tying a Rose Bowl record.

Marvin Harrison Jr. made his first collegiate career start, catching three touchdowns.

== Broadcasting ==
The game was nationally telecasted by ESPN. Chris Fowler Handled Play-by-play duties while Kirk Herbstreit provided color analysis. Holly Rowe and Tiffany Blackmon served as sideline reporters. On National Radio Tom Hart called the game with Jordan Rodgers as his color analyst and Cole Cubelic as their sideline reporter for ESPN Radio. Locally, WBNS broadcast the game in Ohio with Paul Keels and Jim Lachey on the call. In Utah, KALL put on the broadcast, called by Bill Riley, Scott Mitchell, and Stevenson Sylvester. Internationally, the game was made available by ESPN Brasil, with Matheus Suman and Antony Curti on the call

== Hall of Fame ==
The Rose Bowl Hall of Fame induction ceremony was held on December 30, 2021, in front of the Rose Bowl stadium. The 2021 class consisted of Anthony Davis (USC), Jim Delany (Big Ten Conference), and Ron Simpkins (Michigan).
