= 2023 Ohio State Buckeyes football team =

American college football season

2023 Ohio State Buckeyes football

Cotton Bowl Classic, L 3–14 vs. Missouri
- Conference: Big Ten Conference
- East Division

Ranking
- Coaches: No. 10
- AP: No. 10
- Record: 11–2 (8–1 Big Ten)
- Head coach: Ryan Day (5th season)
- Offensive coordinator: Brian Hartline (1st season)
- Offensive scheme: Spread option
- Defensive coordinator: Jim Knowles (2nd season)
- Base defense: 4–2–5
- Captains: Tommy Eichenberg; Cade Stover; Xavier Johnson
- Home stadium: Ohio Stadium

2023 Big Ten Conference football standings
	Conf.			Overall
Team	W		L	W		L
East Division
No. 1 Michigan xy$#^	9	–	0	15	–	0
No. 10 Ohio State	8	–	1	11	–	2
No. 13 Penn State	7	–	2	10	–	3
Maryland	4	–	5	8	–	5
Rutgers	3	–	6	7	–	6
Indiana	1	–	8	3	–	9
Michigan State†	0	–	7	0	–	8
West Division
No. 24 Iowa xy	7	–	2	10	–	4
Northwestern	5	–	4	8	–	5
Wisconsin	5	–	4	7	–	6
Minnesota	3	–	6	6	–	7
Illinois	3	–	6	5	–	7
Nebraska	3	–	6	5	–	7
Purdue	3	–	6	4	–	8
Championship: Michigan 26, Iowa 0
# – College Football Playoff champion; ^ – College Football Playoff participant; $ – Conference champion; x – Division champion/co-champions; y – Championship game participant; † — NCAA vacated all wins for Michigan State (4–8, 2–7); Rankings from AP Poll

The 2023 Ohio State Buckeyes football team represented the Ohio State University as a member of the East Division of the Big Ten Conference during the 2023 NCAA Division I FBS football season. The team was coached by Ryan Day in his fifth season as Ohio State's head coach. The Buckeyes played their home games at Ohio Stadium in Columbus, Ohio. It was the Buckeyes' 134th season overall and 111th as a member of the Big Ten.

== Schedule ==
Date	Time	Opponent	Rank	Site	TV	Result	Attendance
September 2	3:30 p.m.	at Indiana	No. 3	Memorial Stadium; Bloomington, IN	CBS	W 23–3	50,050
September 9	12:00 p.m.	No. 25 (FCS) Youngstown State*	No. 5	Ohio Stadium; Columbus, OH	BTN	W 35–7	102,897
September 16	4:00 p.m.	Western Kentucky*	No. 6	Ohio Stadium; Columbus, OH	FOX	W 63–10	100,217
September 23	7:30 p.m.	at No. 9 Notre Dame*	No. 6	Notre Dame Stadium; South Bend, IN (College GameDay)	NBC	W 17–14	77,622
October 7	12:00 p.m.	Maryland^{†}	No. 4	Ohio Stadium; Columbus, OH (Big Noon Kickoff)	FOX	W 37–17	104,974
October 14	12:00 p.m.	at Purdue	No. 3	Ross–Ade Stadium; West Lafayette, IN	Peacock	W 41–7	57,319
October 21	12:00 p.m.	No. 7 Penn State	No. 3	Ohio Stadium; Columbus, OH (rivalry, College GameDay, Big Noon Kickoff)	FOX	W 20–12	105,506
October 28	7:30 p.m.	at Wisconsin	No. 3	Camp Randall Stadium; Madison, WI	NBC	W 24–10	76,453
November 4	12:00 p.m.	at Rutgers	No. 1	SHI Stadium; Piscataway, NJ	CBS	W 35–16	53,703
November 11	7:30 p.m.	Michigan State	No. 1	Ohio Stadium; Columbus, OH	NBC	W 38–3	105,137
November 18	4:00 p.m.	Minnesota	No. 2	Ohio Stadium; Columbus, OH	BTN	W 37–3	104,019
November 25	12:00 p.m.	at No. 3 Michigan	No. 2	Michigan Stadium; Ann Arbor, MI (rivalry, College GameDay, Big Noon Kickoff)	FOX	L 24–30	110,615
December 29	8:00 p.m.	vs. No. 9 Missouri*	No. 7	AT&T Stadium; Arlington, TX (Cotton Bowl Classic)	ESPN	L 3–14	70,114
*Non-conference game; ^{†}Homecoming; Rankings from AP Poll (and CFP Rankings, after October 31) - Released prior to game; All times are in Eastern time

== Game summaries ==
=== at Indiana ===
No. 3 Ohio State Buckeyes (0–0) at Indiana Hoosiers (0–0) – Game summary

Quarter	1	2	3	4	Total
No. 3 Buckeyes	7	3	10	3	23
Hoosiers	0	3	0	0	3

at Memorial Stadium • Bloomington, Indiana

- Date: September 2
- Game time: 3:30 p.m.
- Game weather: Sunny • Temperature: 86 °F (30 °C) • Wind: SW at 5 miles per hour (8.0 km/h)
- Game attendance: 50,050
- Referee: Bryan Banks
- TV announcers (CBS): Brad Nessler (play-by-play), Gary Danielson (analyst), and Jenny Dell (sideline reporter)
- Box score, Recap

Game information

First quarter

- (7:16) OSU – Miyan Williams 7-yard run, Jayden Fielding kick (Drive: 11 plays, 80 yards, 5:34; Ohio State 7–0)

Second quarter

- (6:15) IU – Chris Freeman 42-yard field goal (Drive: 8 plays, 43 yards, 4:03; Ohio State 7–3)
- (0:03) OSU – Jayden Fielding 40-yard field goal (Drive: 6 plays, 35 yards, 0:35; Ohio State 10–3)

Third quarter

- (6:42) OSU – Jayden Fielding 22-yard field goal (Drive: 11 plays, 76 yards, 5:24; Ohio State 13–3)
- (1:51) OSU – Miyan Williams 3-yard run, Jayden Fielding kick (Drive: 6 plays, 88 yards, 3:24; Ohio State 20–3)

Fourth quarter

- (4:26) OSU – Jayden Fielding 22-yard field goal (Drive: 14 plays, 54 yards, 5:41; Ohio State 23–3)

Ohio State opened its season with a 23–3 victory on September 2 against the Indiana Hoosiers in front of a near-capacity crowd of 50,050 at Memorial Stadium. As part of the Big Ten's new media rights deal, an Ohio State game would be broadcast on CBS for the first time since 2014. Ohio State entered the game having won 27 straight meetings against the Hoosiers. In the week leading up to the game, coach Ryan Day said that junior Kyle McCord would start for the Buckeyes in their opener, with redshirt freshman Devin Brown also expected to see playing time.

The game began with Indiana going three-and-out, with a third-down stop by linebacker Steele Chambers forcing the Hoosiers to punt. McCord and the Buckeyes would then march down the field, punctuated by a 7-yard touchdown from senior running back Miyan Williams. The two teams would then trade punts until the end of the first quarter, with Ohio State's defense able to stifle Indiana's unexpected triple option offense. Ohio State would go on a long drive to start the second quarter, driving down to the Indiana 29, where on 4th-and-2 McCord's pass would be intercepted by defensive back Philip Dunnam after his primary target, running back Chip Trayanum, was knocked over by a Hoosier defender. Indiana would drive down the field after this interception, and would score their first points on a 42-yard field goal by kicker Chris Freeman that bounced off the right upright and through. Brown would see his first snaps on Ohio State's ensuing possession, but would be sacked on third down by defensive lineman Andre Carter, forcing another punt. The half would come to an end with Ohio State taking advantage of a fourth-down stop by safety Josh Proctor and a taunting penalty against Indiana to allow kicker Jayden Fielding to kick a 40-yard field goal, giving Ohio State a 10–3 lead at the break.

The teams traded punts to open the second half. Ohio State was then able to drive deep into Indiana territory, but a missed read on a quarterback run by McCord caused the Buckeye offense to stall in the red zone, resulting in a 22-yard field goal by Fielding to extend the Buckeyes' lead to 13–3. After another Indiana punt, Ohio State would have their most successful drive of the day, with McCord finding tight end Cade Stover for a 49-yard completion as well as a would-be touchdown pass to star wideout Marvin Harrison Jr. that was called back due to Harrison stepping out of bounds before catching the pass. Ohio State would punctuate the drive with a 3-yard touchdown run by Williams, his second of the day, which extended the Buckeye lead to 20–3. Ohio State's defense was able to keep the Hoosiers off the scoreboard in the second half, with redshirt freshman defensive tackle Hero Kanu recording his first career sack. Ohio State would add one more field goal by Fielding in the fourth quarter, a 22-yarder that put the final score at 23–3.

Statistics	OSU	IU
First downs	23	10
Plays–yards	67–380	54–153
Rushes–yards	31–143	33–71
Passing yards	237	82
Passing: comp–att–int	21–36–1	9–21–0
Time of possession	31:55	28:05

Team	Category	Player	Statistics
Ohio State	Passing	Kyle McCord	20/33, 239 yards, 1 INT
Ohio State	Rushing	Chip Trayanum	8 carries, 57 yards
Ohio State	Receiving	Cade Stover	5 receptions, 98 yards
Indiana	Passing	Brendan Sorsby	8/16, 58 yards
Indiana	Rushing	Christian Turner	7 carries, 29 yards
Indiana	Receiving	Cam Camper	3 receptions, 35 yards

=== vs No. 25 (FCS) Youngstown State ===
No. 25 (FCS) Youngstown State Penguins (1–0) vs No. 5 Ohio State Buckeyes (1–0) – Game summary

Quarter	1	2	3	4	Total
No. 25 (FCS) Penguins	7	0	0	0	7
No. 5 Buckeyes	14	14	7	0	35

at Ohio Stadium • Columbus, Ohio

- Date: September 9
- Game time: 12:00 p.m.
- Game weather: Cloudy • Temperature: 74 °F (23 °C) • Wind: SW at 5 miles per hour (8.0 km/h)
- Game attendance: 102,897
- Referee: David Siegle
- TV announcers (BTN): Cory Provus (play-by-play), Jake Butt (analyst), and Brooke Fletcher (sideline reporter)
- Box score, Recap

Game information

First quarter

- (13:34) OSU – Marvin Harrison Jr. 71-yard pass from Kyle McCord, Jayden Fielding kick (Drive: 3 plays, 76 yards, 1:20; Ohio State 7–0)
- (7:42) YSU – Mitch Davidson 1-yard run, Andrew Lastovka kick (Drive: 11 plays, 75 yards, 5:52; Tied 7–7)
- (1:20) OSU – Marvin Harrison Jr. 39-yard pass from Kyle McCord, Jayden Fielding kick (Drive: 4 plays, 93 yards, 1:22; Ohio State 14–7)

Second quarter

- (9:07) OSU – TreVeyon Henderson 13-yard run, Jayden Fielding kick (Drive: 13 plays, 60 yards, 4:51; Ohio State 21–7)
- (3:06) OSU – Emeka Egbuka 28-yard pass from Kyle McCord, Jayden Fielding kick (Drive: 11 plays, 90 yards, 4:37; Ohio State 28–7)

Third quarter

- (1:40) OSU – TreVeyon Henderson 30-yard run, Jayden Fielding kick (Drive: 5 plays, 61 yards, 1:43; Ohio State 35–7)

Fourth quarter

- No scoring plays

On September 9, Ohio State hosted in-state FCS opponent Youngstown State before a capacity crowd of 102,897 at Ohio Stadium. Ohio State won the game 35–7. Entering the game, coach Ryan Day said the quarterback arrangement would remain the same as the previous week, with Kyle McCord starting and Devin Brown seeing significant playing time.

Ohio State won the coin toss and elected to receive. On the Buckeyes' first possession, a holding penalty on center Carson Hinzman set up a 3rd-and-5, where McCord would find Marvin Harrison Jr. on the sideline, who took the pass all the way to the endzone to give Ohio State a 7–0 lead. Youngstown State would answer quickly, with quarterback Mitch Davidson throwing a long completion to wideout Max Tomczak over the head of Buckeye safety Cameron Martinez before scoring on a 1-yard touchdown run on 3rd-and-goal to tie the game at 7. The two teams would then trade punts. On Ohio State's third possession, McCord delivered several sharp passes to Harrison and Emeka Egbuka before finding Harrison in the endzone for a 39-yard touchdown pass to give Ohio State a 14–7 lead. After another Youngstown State punt, Brown would enter the game and lead another touchdown drive, converting a 4th-and-7 on a pass to Gee Scott Jr. as well as a 3rd-and-3 with his legs, before TreVeyon Henderson would cap the drive with a 19-yard touchdown run to give the Buckeyes a 21–7 lead. After Youngstown State went 3-and-out, McCord would re-enter the game and continue to find Harrison and Egbuka to drive Ohio State down the field before Egbuka would score on a 4th-and-1 bubble screen pass from McCord, giving the Buckeyes a 28–7 lead. The teams would trade punts to close out the first half.

On Youngstown State's first drive of the second half, they would methodically drive down the field into Ohio State territory before junior cornerback Denzel Burke was able to intercept a jump ball from quarterback Beau Brungard in the endzone for a touchback, the first interception by an Ohio State cornerback since the 2021 season. After a pair of 3-and-outs by both teams, Brown would re-enter the game and lead a scoring drive by completing passes to Julian Fleming and Carnell Tate before Henderson scored on a 30-yard run to give the Buckeyes a 35–7 lead. This would end up being the final score, as both teams combined for just 7 possessions in the second half, an effect of the new clock stoppage rules introduced during the 2023 season.

Statistics	YSU	OSU
First downs	12	23
Plays–yards	59–234	60–482
Rushes–yards	33–99	27–123
Passing yards	135	359
Passing: comp–att–int	17–26–1	21–33–0
Time of possession	34:00	26:00

Team	Category	Player	Statistics
Youngstown State	Passing	Mitch Davidson	12/18, 98 yards
Youngstown State	Rushing	Tyshon King	12 carries, 66 yards
Youngstown State	Receiving	Max Tomczak	3 receptions, 53 yards
Ohio State	Passing	Kyle McCord	14/20, 258 yards, 3 TD
Ohio State	Rushing	TreVeyon Henderson	5 carries, 56 yards, 2 TD
Ohio State	Receiving	Marvin Harrison Jr.	7 receptions, 160 yards, 2 TD

=== vs Western Kentucky ===
Western Kentucky Hilltoppers (2–0) vs No. 6 Ohio State Buckeyes (2–0) – Game summary

Quarter	1	2	3	4	Total
Hilltoppers	3	7	0	0	10
No. 6 Buckeyes	7	35	7	14	63

at Ohio Stadium • Columbus, Ohio

- Date: September 16
- Game time: 4:00 p.m.
- Game weather: Cloudy • Temperature: 76 °F (24 °C) • Wind: N at 3 miles per hour (4.8 km/h)
- Game attendance: 100,217
- Referee: Jeffrey Servinski
- TV announcers (FOX): Jason Benetti (play-by-play), Brock Huard (analyst), and Allison Williams (sideline reporter)
- Box score, Recap

Game information

First quarter

- (11:32) OSU – TreVeyon Henderson 21-yard run, Jayden Fielding kick (Drive: 8 plays, 75 yards, 3:20; Ohio State 7–0)
- (1:07) WKU – Lucas Carneiro 43-yard field goal (Drive: 11 plays, 31 yards, 4:32; Ohio State 7–3)

Second quarter

- (10:53) OSU – TreVeyon Henderson 7-yard run, Jayden Fielding kick (Drive: 12 plays, 82 yards, 5:07; Ohio State 14–3)
- (8:10) WKU – Malachi Corley 2-yard pass from Austin Reed, Lucas Carneiro kick (Drive: 7 plays, 75 yards, 2:43; Ohio State 14–10)
- (8:00) OSU – Marvin Harrison Jr. 75-yard pass from Kyle McCord, Jayden Fielding kick (Drive: 1 play, 75 yards, 0:10; Ohio State 21–10)
- (4:13) OSU – Chip Trayanum 40-yard run, Jayden Fielding kick (Drive: 1 play, 40 yards, 0:07; Ohio State 28–10)
- (1:55) OSU – Emeka Egbuka 15-yard pass from Kyle McCord, Jayden Fielding kick (Drive: 4 plays, 48 yards, 1:25; Ohio State 35–10)
- (0:08) OSU – Emeka Egbuka 14-yard pass from Kyle McCord, Jayden Fielding kick (Drive: 3 plays, 58 yards, 0:20; Ohio State 42–10)

Third quarter

- (4:38) OSU – Tyleik Williams 0-yard fumble return, Jayden Fielding kick (Ohio State 49–10)

Fourth quarter

- (12:37) OSU – Carnell Tate 28-yard pass from Devin Brown, Jayden Fielding kick (Drive: 7 plays, 55 yards, 3:23; Ohio State 56–10)
- (5:26) OSU – Jermaine Mathews Jr. 58-yard interception return, Jayden Fielding kick (Ohio State 63–10)

On September 16, Ohio State defeated Western Kentucky, 63–10, in front of a near-capacity crowd of 100,217 at Ohio Stadium. On the Tuesday before the game, coach Ryan Day officially announced Kyle McCord as Ohio State's full-time starting quarterback for the remainder of the 2023 season. The game marked the first time that the Buckeyes and the Hilltoppers played.

Ohio State won the coin toss and elected to receive. On Ohio State's first possession, a 4th-and-5 conversion on a pass from McCord to Emeka Egbuka set up a 21-yard run by TreVeyon Henderson to get the Buckeyes on the board first. Western Kentucky would then turn the ball over on downs, with quarterback Austin Reed failing to complete passes on 3rd and 4th down. On Ohio State's next possession, McCord would be strip-sacked by defensive tackle Hosea Wheeler when attempting to throw deep on first down, and Western Kentucky would convert the turnover into points, with a 43-yard field goal by Lucas Carneiro cutting Ohio State's lead to 7–3. Ohio State would drive down the field on its next possession, with McCord converting two third downs with passes to Henderson and Marvin Harrison Jr. before Henderson would find the endzone again with a 7-yard touchdown run to extend OSU's lead to 14–3. Western Kentucky would respond quickly, with Reed completing a long pass to star receiver Malachi Corley before a botched Ohio State fumble recovery would set the Hilltoppers up in the redzone, where Reed would hit Corley on a screen pass for a 2-yard touchdown, cutting the Buckeye lead to 14–10. On the first play after, McCord would find Harrison streaking wide open for an easy touchdown, putting Ohio State up 21–10. After a fourth-down pass breakup by safety Josh Proctor gave Ohio State the ball back, running back Chip Trayanum would run for a 40-yard touchdown on the very next play, his first touchdown since transferring from Arizona State in 2022. On the next possession, a fumble by wideout Blue Smith would give Ohio State the ball once again, and McCord would convert the turnover into another touchdown drive, capped by a 15-yard pass to Egbuka. After a turnover on downs by Western Kentucky, McCord would complete passes to Cade Stover and Egbuka, the latter of which was a 14-yard touchdown pass to give Ohio State a 42–10 lead heading into the half. Ohio State's 35 second-quarter points were its most in any quarter since 2019.

The teams would trade punts to start the second half as Ohio State began pulling some of its starters. On Western Kentucky's third possession of the half, cornerback Denzel Burke would force a fumble from WKU's Davion Ervin-Poindexter, which would be recovered by Ohio State defensive tackle Tyleik Williams for a scoop-and-score to extend Ohio State's lead to 49–10. On Western Kentucky's next drive, Reed would throw an interception to linebacker Steele Chambers, his first interception of the year. Backup quarterback Devin Brown would enter the game and lead a touchdown drive, capped off with a 28-yard touchdown pass to freshman wideout Carnell Tate, the first touchdown in an Ohio State uniform for both. The final score of the day would come on a pick-six by freshman cornerback Jermaine Mathews Jr., who picked off a pass from WKU backup quarterback Bronson Barron, to put the final score at 63–10.

Statistics	WKU	OSU
First downs	15	24
Plays–yards	72–284	60–562
Rushes–yards	33–80	33–204
Passing yards	204	358
Passing: comp–att–int	22–39–2	22–27–1
Time of possession	32:34	27:26

Team	Category	Player	Statistics
Western Kentucky	Passing	Austin Reed	21/37, 207 yards, 1 TD, 1 INT
Western Kentucky	Rushing	L. T. Sanders	7 carries, 26 yards
Western Kentucky	Receiving	Malachi Corley	8 receptions, 88 yards, 1 TD
Ohio State	Passing	Kyle McCord	19/23, 318 yards, 3 TD
Ohio State	Rushing	TreVeyon Henderson	13 carries, 88 yards, 2 TD
Ohio State	Receiving	Marvin Harrison Jr.	5 receptions, 126 yards, 1 TD

=== at No. 9 Notre Dame ===
No. 6 Ohio State Buckeyes (3–0) at No. 9 Notre Dame Fighting Irish (3–0) – Game summary

Quarter	1	2	3	4	Total
No. 6 Buckeyes	0	3	7	7	17
No. 9 Fighting Irish	0	0	7	7	14

at Notre Dame Stadium • South Bend, Indiana

- Date: September 23
- Game time: 7:30 p.m.
- Game weather: Sunny • Temperature: 72 °F (22 °C) • Wind: E at 8 miles per hour (13 km/h)
- Game attendance: 77,622
- Referee: Larry Smith
- TV announcers (NBC): Noah Eagle (play-by-play), Todd Blackledge (analyst), and Kathryn Tappen (sideline reporter)
- Box score, Recap

Game information

First quarter

- No scoring plays

Second quarter

- (0:26) OSU – Jayden Fielding 31-yard field goal (Drive: 12 plays, 66 yards, 3:20; Ohio State 3–0)

Third quarter

- (11:14) OSU – TreVeyon Henderson 61-yard run, Jayden Fielding kick (Drive: 1 play, 61 yards, 0:11; Ohio State 10–0)
- (3:35) ND – Gi'Bran Payne 1-yard run, Spencer Shrader kick (Drive: 13 plays, 75 yards, 7:39; Ohio State 10–7)

Fourth quarter

- (8:22) ND – Rico Flores Jr. 2-yard pass from Sam Hartman, Spencer Shrader kick (Drive: 11 plays, 96 yards, 6:28; Notre Dame 14–10)
- (0:01) OSU – Chip Trayanum 1-yard run, Jayden Fielding kick (Drive: 15 plays, 65 yards, 1:26; Ohio State 17–14)

On September 23, Ohio State visited Notre Dame Stadium to take on the Notre Dame Fighting Irish in a matchup of top-10 teams, and a rematch of the previous year's game in Columbus, which Ohio State won 21–10. College GameDay was in attendance. The game was Ohio State's first game televised on NBC since their 1996 matchup with Notre Dame, which they won 29–16. The game was the eighth all-time meeting between the Buckeyes and Fighting Irish, with the Buckeyes having won each of their previous five meetings.

Ohio State won the game 17–14. The game began with Notre Dame winning the coin toss and deferring. Ohio State would drive into Notre Dame territory, but the drive stalled after a false start penalty on right tackle Josh Fryar set up 2nd-and-long. On Notre Dame's first drive, they would reach the red zone with several completions by quarterback Sam Hartman, but on a 4th-and-1, Hartman ran out of bounds inches short of the first down marker, turning the ball over. Ohio State would fail to move the ball on their next possession, and Notre Dame would drive into OSU territory once again, where kicker Spencer Shrader would miss a 47-yard field goal. On Ohio State's next drive, quarterback Kyle McCord would complete several third-down passes as Ohio State reached the Notre Dame 1-yard line, but they would fail to score and turned it over on downs. After a Notre Dame punt, McCord would have his best drive of the day, completing several passes to Emeka Egbuka and gaining yardage when Marvin Harrison Jr. was interfered with. Ohio State would cap the drive with a 31-yard field goal by kicker Jayden Fielding to take a 3–0 lead into halftime.

Notre Dame got the ball to start the second half, and began leaning on the run game, driving down into Ohio State territory. On 4th-and-1 from the Ohio State 39, Hartman's quarterback sneak came up short, with safeties Sonny Styles and Lathan Ransom making the critical tackle. On Ohio State's next play, running back TreVeyon Henderson would spring loose for a 61-yard touchdown run, but Harrison Jr., who delivered the block that sprang Henderson, had his ankle rolled up on; he would play with the ankle taped up heavily for the rest of the game. On Notre Dame's next drive, they would continue to hand the ball off to a deep stable of running backs, with three different backs combining for 10 carries and 54 yards, with the drive capped by a 1-yard touchdown run by Gi'Bran Payne to cut the Ohio State lead to 10–7. Ohio State's next drive would reach the Notre Dame 39, where on 3rd-and-9 a McCord pass to Egbuka for a first down was called back for an unnecessary roughness penalty on Fryar. Ohio State would punt, pinning Notre Dame back at their own 4.

Notre Dame would start the fourth quarter pinned deep in their own territory, but they would quickly drive down the field, with Hartman completing passes of 28 and 25 yards to freshman receiver Jaden Greathouse and tight end Mitchell Evans. From there, Notre Dame's running backs would drive the rest of the way before Hartman capped the drive with a touchdown pass to Rico Flores Jr. to give Notre Dame their first lead of the night at 14–10. Ohio State's next drive began with 8 minutes left, and they would enter Notre Dame territory on a 40-yard catch by team captain Xavier Johnson. A pass interference call on Notre Dame would take the Buckeyes into the red zone. On 3rd-and-1 from the Notre Dame 11, a run by Henderson up the middle was stopped short, before an end-around run by Egbuka was snuffed out by the Irish, and Ohio State turned the ball over on downs. After two Notre Dame first downs brought the clock under 3 minutes, defensive end JT Tuimoloau would sack Hartman on first down, and bat down an attempted screen pass on second down, which would help end the drive and give Ohio State's offense the ball back with 90 seconds to go.

Ohio State's final drive started with two incomplete screen passes by McCord, before a 23-yard pass to Egbuka picked up a first down. The Buckeyes would only gain 3 yards on McCord's next three pass attempts, with Notre Dame's defensive line able to generate pressure on the young quarterback. On 4th-and-7, McCord would find Julian Fleming on a crossing route, and he would gain exactly the 7 yards needed. After a first-down incompletion, McCord would then find Harrison over the middle to advance to the Notre Dame 13 with less than 30 seconds left. On 2nd-and-10, McCord would attempt to throw the ball away to avoid a sack, but instead was called for intentional grounding, which forced Ohio State to use its last timeout and set up a 3rd-and-19 with 15 seconds left. On the following play, McCord was able to find Egbuka, who hauled in the ball at the Notre Dame 1 to set up 1st-and-goal with 7 seconds left. Ohio State would attempt a pass to Harrison that was overthrown by McCord, before with 3 seconds left Ohio State would hand the ball off to Chip Trayanum who plunged in for the touchdown with 1 second left, securing a 17–14 victory for Ohio State.

Following the game, coach Ryan Day would call out those doubting Ohio State's toughness, specifically former Notre Dame head coach and Ohio State assistant Lou Holtz. It would later come out that Notre Dame only had 10 defensive players on the field for each of Ohio State's final two plays, including Trayanum's game-winning touchdown. For his efforts in the game, safety Lathan Ransom was named the Big Ten Defensive Player of the Week. Ransom had 13 tackles, 7 solo tackles and a quarterback hurry in the game.

Statistics	OSU	ND
First downs	19	22
Plays–yards	65–366	64–351
Rushes–yards	27–126	39–176
Passing yards	240	175
Passing: comp–att–int	21–38–0	17–25–0
Time of possession	25:01	34:59

Team	Category	Player	Statistics
Ohio State	Passing	Kyle McCord	21/37, 240 yards
Ohio State	Rushing	TreVeyon Henderson	14 carries, 104 yards, 1 TD
Ohio State	Receiving	Emeka Egbuka	7 receptions, 96 yards
Notre Dame	Passing	Sam Hartman	17/25, 175 yards, 1 TD
Notre Dame	Rushing	Audric Estimé	14 carries, 70 yards
Notre Dame	Receiving	Mitchell Evans	6 receptions, 70 yards

=== vs Maryland ===
Maryland Terrapins (5–0) vs No. 4 Ohio State Buckeyes (4–0) – Game summary

Quarter	1	2	3	4	Total
Terrapins	7	3	7	0	17
No. 4 Buckeyes	0	10	10	17	37

at Ohio Stadium • Columbus, Ohio

- Date: October 7
- Game time: 12:00 p.m.
- Game weather: Cloudy • Temperature: 54 °F (12 °C) • Wind: NW at 12 miles per hour (19 km/h)
- Game attendance: 104,974
- Referee: Chris Coyle
- TV announcers (FOX): Gus Johnson (play-by-play), Joel Klatt (analyst), and Jenny Taft (sideline reporter)
- Box score, Recap

Game information

First quarter

- (12:41) MD – Kaden Prather 15-yard pass from Taulia Tagovailoa, Jack Howes kick (Drive: 4 plays, 30 yards, 1:28; Maryland 7–0)

Second quarter

- (12:56) MD – Jack Howes 21-yard field goal (Drive: 12 plays, 60 yards, 5:07; Maryland 10–0)
- (9:41) OSU – Josh Proctor 24-yard interception return, Jayden Fielding kick (Maryland 10–7)
- (1:32) OSU – Jayden Fielding 36-yard field goal (Drive: 6 plays, 72 yards, 2:43; Tied 10–10)

Third quarter

- (11:03) MD – Taulia Tagovailoa 9-yard run, Jack Howes kick (Drive: 9 plays, 75 yards, 3:57; Maryland 17–10)
- (8:56) OSU – Chip Trayanum 4-yard run, Jayden Fielding kick (Drive: 4 plays, 76 yards, 2:01; Tied 17–17)
- (2:19) OSU – Jayden Fielding 24-yard field goal (Drive: 9 plays, 33 yards, 3:49; Ohio State 20–17)

Fourth quarter

- (10:16) OSU – Cade Stover 44-yard pass from Kyle McCord, Jayden Fielding kick (Drive: 8 plays, 75 yards, 4:37; Ohio State 27–17)
- (7:01) OSU – Marvin Harrison Jr. 17-yard pass from Kyle McCord, Jayden Fielding kick (Drive: 3 plays, 17 yards, 1:32; Ohio State 34–17)
- (2:10) OSU – Jayden Fielding 41-yard field goal (Drive: 8 plays, 27 yards, 3:22; Ohio State 37–17)

On October 7, Ohio State hosted Maryland in a matchup of unbeaten teams at Ohio Stadium. The game was played in front of an over-capacity crowd of 104,974. This was the ninth all-time meeting between the Buckeyes and Terrapins, with Ohio State having won all eight previous matchups, most recently a 43–30 win in the 2022 season. Hours before the game, it was announced that running back TreVeyon Henderson would miss the game because of precautionary reasons, and in his stead Chip Trayanum made his first start since transferring to Ohio State in 2022.

Ohio State won the game 37–17. The game began with a Buckeye three-and-out, followed by Ohio State botching a punt with linebacker Cody Simon recovering a low snap, but he would be stopped well behind the line to gain. This would set Maryland up with a short field, which they would convert to points with a 15-yard touchdown pass from quarterback Taulia Tagovailoa to wideout Kaden Prather, who made a spectacular one-handed catch to give Maryland a 7–0 lead. Ohio State's next drive would be briefly interrupted by a drone flying over the field, before a third-down sack of McCord by defensive lineman Kellen Wyatt forced an Ohio State punt. Maryland would then drive into Ohio State territory, but a fourth-down run by backup quarterback Billy Edwards would be stopped for a loss by defensive end JT Tuimoloau, giving Ohio State the ball back, where another third-down sack of McCord would force another Ohio State punt. Maryland would then drive deep into Ohio State territory, but a goal-line stand by the Ohio State defense forced Maryland to kick a 21-yard field goal to take a 10–0 lead. After another quick Ohio State punt, the Buckeyes would get back in the game with a big play from their defense as safety Josh Proctor jumped in front of a pass from Tagovailoa and returned it all the way to the endzone for a pick-six to cut the deficit to 10–7. The teams would trade punts before McCord would find Marvin Harrison Jr. on two passes of 58 and 18 yards to drive into the red zone, which would set up a 36-yard field goal by Jayden Fielding to tie the game at 10–10. With 90 seconds before halftime, Maryland would drive deep into Ohio State territory, aided by penalties committed by Denzel Burke and Mike Hall Jr.. With 12 seconds left and no timeouts, Tagovailoa would check it down to running back Antwain Littleton II, who would be tackled in bounds, running out the clock and keeping the score tied at 10–10 at halftime.

Maryland would get the ball to open the second half, and would drive right down the field, capping the drive with a 9-yard scramble for a touchdown by Tagovailoa to take a 17–10 lead. Ohio State would respond with their best offensive drive of the day, with McCord finding receivers Emeka Egbuka and Julian Fleming for big gains before a 4-yard touchdown run by Trayanum tied the game at 17. Maryland's next drive would be marked by a big hit delivered by Burke, before on third-and-10 Tagovailoa threw an errant pass to Lathan Ransom who easily intercepted the pass to give Ohio State good field position. Ohio State's ensuing drive would reach the Maryland 6 before stalling, which led to a chip-shot field goal by Fielding to give Ohio State a 20–17 lead. On Maryland's next drive, a Tagovailoa quarterback draw on third-and-9 was stopped by Sonny Styles, forcing a Maryland punt to end the third quarter. On Ohio State's next drive, Egbuka would suffer a lower-body injury and was forced to leave the game; he would not return. Ohio State would then push the ball down the field, with McCord finding Harrison Jr. on an over-the-shoulder catch to convert 2nd-and-33, before finding Cade Stover wide open for a 44-yard touchdown pass to give Ohio State a 27–17 lead. Maryland would then turn it over on downs inside their own territory after calling four straight run plays. Ohio State would capitalize with a touchdown pass from McCord to Harrison Jr. to take a 34–17 lead, which came after another Harrison Jr. touchdown catch was nullified by an illegal motion penalty on Xavier Johnson. Maryland would promptly go three-and-out, with Hall sacking Tagovailoa on second down. Ohio State would add a 41-yard field goal by Fielding to put the final score at 37–17.

The game marked coach Ryan Day's 50th career win. He tied Barry Switzer as the second-fastest coach to reach 50 wins, doing it in just 56 games (behind Boise State's Chris Petersen). For their efforts in the game, Harrison Jr. and Proctor were named the Big Ten's offensive and defensive players of the week. Harrison Jr. caught eight passes for 163 yards and a touchdown, while Proctor finished with seven tackles, 1.5 tackles for loss, and a pick-six.

Statistics	MD	OSU
First downs	20	21
Plays–yards	76–302	62–382
Rushes–yards	35–106	32–62
Passing yards	196	320
Passing: comp–att–int	21–41–2	19–29–0
Time of possession	30:04	29:56

Team	Category	Player	Statistics
Maryland	Passing	Taulia Tagovailoa	21/41, 196 yards, 1 TD, 2 INT
Maryland	Rushing	Antwain Littleton II	11 carries, 38 yards
Maryland	Receiving	Jeshaun Jones	5 receptions, 59 yards
Ohio State	Passing	Kyle McCord	19/29, 320 yards, 2 TD
Ohio State	Rushing	Chip Trayanum	20 carries, 61 yards, 1 TD
Ohio State	Receiving	Marvin Harrison Jr.	8 receptions, 163 yards, 1 TD

=== at Purdue ===
No. 3 Ohio State Buckeyes (5–0) at Purdue Boilermakers (2–4) – Game summary

Quarter	1	2	3	4	Total
No. 3 Buckeyes	13	7	14	7	41
Boilermakers	0	0	0	7	7

at Ross-Ade Stadium • West Lafayette, Indiana

- Date: October 14
- Game time: 12:00 p.m.
- Game weather: Cloudy • Temperature: 56 °F (13 °C) • Wind: NW at 7 miles per hour (11 km/h)
- Game attendance: 57,319
- Referee: Gregory Blum
- TV announcers (Peacock): Andrew Siciliano (play-by-play), Kyle Rudolph (analyst), and Lewis Johnson (sideline reporter)
- Box score, Recap

Game information

First quarter

- (9:11) OSU – Marvin Harrison Jr. 14-yard pass from Kyle McCord, Jayden Fielding kick failed (Drive: 8 plays, 69 yards, 2:43; Ohio State 6–0)
- (3:44) OSU – Devin Brown 2-yard run, Jayden Fielding kick (Drive: 8 plays, 51 yards, 4:06; Ohio State 13–0)

Second quarter

- (6:02) OSU – Cade Stover 4-yard pass from Kyle McCord, Jayden Fielding kick (Drive: 11 plays, 73 yards, 5:27; Ohio State 20–0)

Third quarter

- (12:24) OSU – Dallan Hayden 1-yard run, Jayden Fielding kick (Drive: 6 plays, 67 yards, 2:30; Ohio State 27–0)
- (4:36) OSU – Cade Stover 14-yard pass from Kyle McCord, Jayden Fielding kick (Drive: 5 plays, 80 yards, 2:59; Ohio State 34–0)

Fourth quarter

- (14:30) PUR – Deion Burks 6-yard pass from Hudson Card, Caleb Krockover kick (Drive: 6 plays, 20 yards, 1:15; Ohio State 34–7)
- (7:35) OSU – Brandon Inniss 58-yard pass from Devin Brown, Jayden Fielding kick (Drive: 3 plays, 64 yards, 1:23; Ohio State 41–7)

On October 14, Ohio State visited Ross-Ade Stadium to take on the Purdue Boilermakers. Purdue, especially at home, had been known to give Ohio State fits: in their last 8 matchups in West Lafayette, Purdue had won 5. Despite this, Ohio State entered as a heavy favorite over the 2-4 Boilermakers. Before the game, Ohio State announced that starting running back TreVeyon Henderson, backup back Miyan Williams and starting wideout Emeka Egbuka would miss the game with injuries.

The game began with Ohio State winning the coin toss and deferring. Purdue's first drive would feature several option plays, allowing them to drive into Ohio State territory, but Julio Macias would miss a field goal wide left. Ohio State's drive would feature a heavy dose of Marvin Harrison Jr. who made catches of 15, 34, and 14 yards, the last of which was a touchdown catch to put Ohio State up 6–0 after a missed PAT. After a quick Purdue punt, Ohio State would drive into the red zone before backup quarterback Devin Brown would enter the game to provide a mobility boost. Brown would run for 8 yards on third-and-1 before a 2-yard touchdown run by Brown would give Ohio State a 13-0 lead. After another Purdue three-and-out, Ohio State would embark on another lengthy drive, which would feature a "tush push" play to convert a third-and-1 near midfield, but would also be marred by Chip Trayanum suffering an injury after taking a hit from two Purdue defenders. This would allow Dallan Hayden to see his first important playing time of the season, ironically just a few days after Ryan Day said that he planned for Hayden to redshirt in the 2023 season. Once Ohio State reached the red zone, Brown would re-enter the game, but would unfortunately fumble the ball into the endzone on a quarterback run, which Hayden was unable to recover, resulting in a touchback. Another Purdue three-and-out would give Ohio State the ball back, where they would drive down the field with runs by Hayden and Xavier Johnson filling in at running back. A 4-yard touchdown pass from Kyle McCord to Cade Stover would give Ohio State a 20–0 lead. After a trade of punts, Purdue would get the ball with just over 2 minutes left and drive deep into Ohio State territory, with running back Devin Mockobee rushing for 47 yards on 3 carries as Purdue reached the Ohio State 1; however, a holding penalty on tight end Garrett Miller as well as a sack split by defensive ends JT Tuimoloau and Jack Sawyer would force a 39-yard field goal try by Macias, which would bounce off the left upright to keep Purdue scoreless entering the half.

Ohio State would get the ball to start the second half and march right down the field, and would score on a 1-yard touchdown run by Hayden to give the Buckeyes a 27–0 lead. On Purdue's ensuing drive, they would drive deep into Ohio State territory after a pass interference penalty on Lathan Ransom extended the Boilermakers' drive. This would set up another field goal attempt for Macias, this time a 27-yarder, and again Macias would push the kick wide left to keep Purdue scoreless. Ohio State would then score another touchdown on their next drive, with freshman wideout Carnell Tate catching passes of 16 and 55 yards before a 14-yard touchdown pass from McCord to Stover would extend the Buckeye lead to 34–0. After a few punts, McCord would be strip sacked by Purdue's Nic Scourton, giving Purdue prime field position which they would turn into points with a 6-yard pass from Hudson Card to wideout Deion Burks, breaking the shutout and cutting the Ohio State lead to 34–7. After another trade of punts, Brown and the Ohio State backups would enter the game. On the ensuing Buckeye drive, Brown would find freshman wideout Brandon Inniss on a 58-yard touchdown pass, the first catch and first touchdown at Ohio State for the latter. This extended Ohio State's lead to 41–7, which would end up as the game's final score.

Statistics	OSU	PUR
First downs	24	15
Plays–yards	69–486	70–257
Rushes–yards	38–152	35–123
Passing yards	334	134
Passing: comp–att–int	17–30–0	14–35–0
Time of possession	32:27	27:33

Team	Category	Player	Statistics
Ohio State	Passing	Kyle McCord	16/28, 276 yards, 3 TD
Ohio State	Rushing	Dallan Hayden	11 carries, 76 yards, 1 TD
Ohio State	Receiving	Marvin Harrison Jr.	6 receptions, 105 yards, 1 TD
Purdue	Passing	Hudson Card	13/32, 126 yards, 1 TD
Purdue	Rushing	Devin Mockobee	18 carries, 110 yards
Purdue	Receiving	Mershawn Rice	3 receptions, 50 yards

=== vs No. 7 Penn State (rivalry) ===
No. 7 Penn State Nittany Lions (6–0) vs No. 3 Ohio State Buckeyes (6–0) – Game summary

Quarter	1	2	3	4	Total
No. 7 Nittany Lions	3	3	0	6	12
No. 3 Buckeyes	3	7	0	10	20

at Ohio Stadium • Columbus, Ohio

- Date: October 21
- Game time: 12:00 p.m.
- Game weather: Mostly cloudy • Temperature: 54 °F (12 °C) • Wind: W at 4 miles per hour (6.4 km/h)
- Game attendance: 105,506
- Referee: Jerry McGinn
- TV announcers (FOX): Gus Johnson (play-by-play), Joel Klatt (analyst), and Jenny Taft (sideline reporter)
- Box score, Recap

Game information

First quarter

- (10:49) OSU – Jayden Fielding 33-yard field goal (Drive: 11 plays, 57 yards, 3:37; Ohio State 3–0)
- (5:15) PSU – Alex Felkins 40-yard field goal (Drive: 6 plays, 39 yards, 2:36; Tied 3–3)

Second quarter

- (7:31) OSU – Miyan Williams 2-yard run, Jayden Fielding kick (Drive: 13 plays, 61 yards, 5:17; Ohio State 10–3)
- (4:16) PSU – Alex Felkins 41-yard field goal (Drive: 7 plays, 51 yards, 3:15; Ohio State 10–6)

Third quarter

- No scoring plays

Fourth quarter

- (8:59) OSU – Jayden Fielding 37-yard field goal (Drive: 9 plays, 71 yards, 4:40; Ohio State 13–6)
- (4:07) OSU – Marvin Harrison Jr. 18-yard pass from Kyle McCord, Jayden Fielding kick (Drive: 6 plays, 43 yards, 3:10; Ohio State 20–6)
- (0:29) PSU – Kaden Saunders 8-yard pass from Drew Allar, two-point pass failed (Drive: 12 plays, 73 yards, 2:12; Ohio State 20–12)

On October 21, Ohio State hosted Penn State in a top-10 matchup of unbeaten teams. Ohio State had won 10 of their last 11 matchups against the Nittany Lions, with the lone loss a 2016 upset in Happy Valley. The game had an over-capacity attendance of 105,506. Before the game, star cornerback Denzel Burke was ruled out, and TreVeyon Henderson and Emeka Egbuka were listed as questionable; neither would play a snap.

Ohio State won the coin toss and deferred. Penn State would go 3-and-out on their first drive, with quarterback Drew Allar throwing two incomplete passes. On Ohio State's first drive, Marvin Harrison Jr. would catch three passes for first downs, but three incompletions in the red zone by Kyle McCord would force an Ohio State field goal, which Jayden Fielding would make to take a 3–0 lead. After a trade of punts, Penn State back Nicholas Singleton would run for two straight first downs, setting up a 40-yard field goal by Alex Felkins which tied the game at 3–3. After a few more punts, Ohio State would drive into Penn State territory early in the second quarter, but during the drive, Penn State star defensive end Chop Robinson would suffer an injury and wouldn't return. With Ohio State in the red zone, McCord would be strip-sacked by Penn State linebacker Curtis Jacobs, who would run it back for a scoop-and-score, but the play would be called back thanks to a holding penalty on corner Kalen King who was guarding Harrison Jr. That would set up a short touchdown run by Miyan Williams a few plays later to give Ohio State a 10–3 lead. On Penn State's ensuing drive, Allar would find tight ends Tyler Warren and Theo Johnson for chunk plays to get Penn State into Ohio State territory, but the drive would stall out and Penn State would settle for a 41-yard field goal by Felkins to cut the Ohio State lead to 10–6. After another punt by each team, Ryan Day opted to kneel out the remaining 42 seconds of the half despite having all three timeouts, taking Ohio State's 10–6 lead into halftime.

Ohio State would go three-and-out on their first drive out of halftime, with their first play losing 5 yards on a handoff to Williams. Penn State's first drive wouldn't fare much better, with Josh Proctor making a third-down tackle for loss on Singleton. A holding penalty on tackle Josh Simmons followed by a sack of McCord by Adisa Isaac on Ohio State's next drive forced punter Jesse Mirco to kick from the back of his own endzone, and he booted a 72-yard punt to flip the field. After a Penn State punt, the Buckeyes would drive deep into Penn State territory looking to take a two-score lead. After backup quarterback Devin Brown suffered an ankle sprain on a run down to the Penn State 1, Penn State would snuff out a Williams run and a bubble screen to Carnell Tate to force a turnover on downs. After Penn State's next drive went nowhere, they would catch a break on special teams as they recovered a punt that bounced off the foot of Lorenzo Styles Jr. to give Allar and the Nittany Lions good field position. On the first play of the fourth quarter, defensive end JT Tuimoloau would sack Allar on second down, forcing another punt. On Ohio State's ensuing drive, McCord would find Harrison Jr. and Cade Stover on chunk passes to drive into Penn State territory. The drive would stall in the red zone, forcing a 37-yard field goal by Fielding which he made to extend Ohio State's lead to 13–6. On Penn State's ensuing drive, Tuimoloau would pressure Allar on 4th-and-3, forcing an incompletion to give Ohio State the ball back. A facemask penalty on Penn State would kickstart the ensuing Ohio State drive, where McCord would find Harrison Jr. on a crossing route for an 18-yard touchdown which extended Ohio State's lead to 20–6. With time winding down, Allar would lead the Nittany Lions into Ohio State territory, but then was called for intentional grounding to back Penn State up. On 4th-and-30, Allar would be sacked by defensive end Kenyatta Jackson Jr. as three Buckeyes converged on Allar. After a quick Ohio State punt, Allar would lead Penn State down the field and throw an 8-yard touchdown pass to Kaden Saunders with 29 seconds left. Penn State went for two by attempting a trick play pass with wide receiver KeAndre Lambert-Smith, but the pass was broken up by linebacker Steele Chambers to keep the score at 20–12 in favor of Ohio State. Penn State would attempt an onside kick, but it would be recovered by Ohio State's Carnell Tate, sealing the 20–12 victory for the Buckeyes.

Statistics	PSU	OSU
First downs	15	22
Plays–yards	68–240	76–365
Rushes–yards	26–49	39–79
Passing yards	191	286
Passing: comp–att–int	18–42–0	22–35–0
Time of possession	25:36	34:24

Team	Category	Player	Statistics
Penn State	Passing	Drew Allar	18/42, 191 yards, 1 TD
Penn State	Rushing	Nicholas Singleton	9 carries, 48 yards
Penn State	Receiving	KeAndre Lambert-Smith	6 receptions, 52 yards
Ohio State	Passing	Kyle McCord	22/35, 286 yards, 1 TD
Ohio State	Rushing	Miyan Williams	24 carries, 62 yards, 1 TD
Ohio State	Receiving	Marvin Harrison Jr.	11 receptions, 162 yards, 1 TD

=== at Wisconsin ===
No. 3 Ohio State Buckeyes (7–0) at Wisconsin Badgers (5–2) – Game summary

Quarter	1	2	3	4	Total
No. 3 Buckeyes	3	7	7	7	24
Badgers	0	3	7	0	10

at Camp Randall Stadium • Madison, Wisconsin

- Date: October 28
- Game time: 7:30 p.m.
- Game weather: Cloudy • Temperature: 40 °F (4 °C) • Wind: S at 8 miles per hour (13 km/h)
- Game attendance: 76,453
- Referee: Larry Smith
- TV announcers (NBC): Noah Eagle (play-by-play), Todd Blackledge (analyst), and Kathryn Tappen (sideline reporter)
- Box score, Recap

Game information

First quarter

- (8:09) OSU – Jayden Fielding 27-yard field goal (Drive: 7 plays, 47 yards, 2:53; Ohio State 3–0)

Second quarter

- (10:36) OSU – Marvin Harrison Jr. 16-yard pass from Kyle McCord, Jayden Fielding kick (Drive: 7 plays, 52 yards, 4:07; Ohio State 10–0)
- (0:00) WIS – Nathanial Vakos 19-yard field goal (Drive: 12 plays, 51 yards, 5:09; Ohio State 10–3)

Third quarter

- (12:30) WIS – Will Pauling 13-yard pass from Braedyn Locke, Nathanial Vakos kick (Drive: 7 plays, 75 yards, 2:30; Tied 10–10)
- (7:14) OSU – Marvin Harrison Jr. 19-yard pass from Kyle McCord, Jayden Fielding kick (Drive: 9 plays, 75 yards, 5:16; Ohio State 17–10)

Fourth quarter

- (5:15) OSU – TreVeyon Henderson 33-yard run, Jayden Fielding kick (Drive: 3 plays, 45 yards, 1:30; Ohio State 24–10)

On October 28, Ohio State visited Camp Randall Stadium to take on the Wisconsin Badgers in a primetime matchup. Wisconsin had not lost a home night game since their 2016 overtime loss to Ohio State. Ohio State had won their last 9 matchups against Wisconsin, with their most recent loss coming in Madison in 2010. Prior to the game, TreVeyon Henderson and Denzel Burke were ruled healthy after missing the Penn State game, and Emeka Egbuka was also ruled healthy but did not end up playing. Miyan Williams was ruled out with an undisclosed injury.

Wisconsin won the coin toss and deferred. Ohio State's first drive would reach Wisconsin territory before Kyle McCord would overthrow Marvin Harrison Jr. on third-and-3, before on fourth down McCord would be strip-sacked by linebacker C. J. Goetz, who blitzed past right tackle Josh Fryar for the sack. On Wisconsin's second play after the turnover, Braelon Allen would fumble it right back to Ohio State, which was forced by defensive end Jack Sawyer and recovered by cornerback Davison Igbinosun. Ohio State would convert the fumble into points after a pass from McCord to Henderson got the Buckeyes into field goal range, which Jayden Fielding would make to give Ohio State a 3–0 lead. After a trade of punts, a big punt return by Chimere Dike of Wisconsin would get the Badgers to the outskirts of field goal range, but Wisconsin kicker Nathanial Vakos would sail a 54-yard try wide left, giving Ohio State the ball back. Ohio State would drive into the redzone, but McCord would throw an interception to Preston Zachman, just his second of the year. After a quick punt, McCord and Henderson would engineer an efficient drive capped off by a 16-yard touchdown pass from McCord to Harrison Jr. to give Ohio State a 10–0 lead. After another punt, McCord would throw another interception to Ricardo Hallman, the latter's fifth interception of the season. Wisconsin would end the half with a lengthy drive down to the Ohio State 1, but Ohio State's defense would stiffen up and keep the Badgers out of the endzone. During this drive, Allen would be injured on an attempted shovel pass at the goal line and would not return for the remainder of the game. Vakos would put Wisconsin on the board with a 19-yard field goal to make the halftime score 10–3 in favor of Ohio State.

On Wisconsin's opening drive of the second half, Wisconsin quarterback Braedyn Locke would put together a great drive, with a pass of 27 yards, a quarterback draw that went for 29 yards, and a touchdown pass to Will Pauling to tie the game at 10. Ohio State would respond quickly, with Henderson creating an explosive run in Wisconsin territory and McCord completing two chunk passes to Harrison Jr., the second of which was a 19-yard touchdown to give Ohio State a 17–10 lead. The teams would trade punts until the middle of the 4th quarter, with the Wisconsin defensive line putting pressure on McCord and forcing sacks and intentional grounding penalties to bottle up the Ohio State offense. With just under 7 minutes left in the 4th quarter, Ohio State would lean into the run game, and Henderson would break free for a 33-yard touchdown run to extend Ohio State's lead to 24–10. Locke would be unable to produce much offense on Wisconsin's final two drives, and Ohio State would emerge victorious in Madison by a final score of 24–10.

In his first game back from injury, Henderson would rack up 162 rushing yards on 24 carries, his highest rushing output since September 18, 2021 against Tulsa. With his 123-yard, two-touchdown performance, Harrison Jr. passed Garrett Wilson and Doug Donley to become ninth among Ohio State receivers in receiving yards, and passed Wilson and Brian Robiskie to become fifth in receiving touchdowns.

Statistics	OSU	WIS
First downs	23	14
Plays–yards	69–407	64–258
Rushes–yards	41–181	25–94
Passing yards	226	164
Passing: comp–att–int	17–26–2	18–39–0
Time of possession	33:50	26:10

Team	Category	Player	Statistics
Ohio State	Passing	Kyle McCord	17/26, 226 yards, 2 TD, 2 INT
Ohio State	Rushing	TreVeyon Henderson	24 carries, 162 yards, 1 TD
Ohio State	Receiving	Marvin Harrison Jr.	6 receptions, 123 yards, 2 TD
Wisconsin	Passing	Braedyn Locke	18/39, 164 yards, 1 TD
Wisconsin	Rushing	Braelon Allen	10 carries, 50 yards
Wisconsin	Receiving	Will Pauling	4 receptions, 51 yards, 1 TD

=== at Rutgers ===
No. 1 Ohio State Buckeyes (8–0) at Rutgers Scarlet Knights (6–2) – Game summary

Quarter	1	2	3	4	Total
No. 1 Buckeyes	7	0	14	14	35
Scarlet Knights	0	9	0	7	16

at SHI Stadium • Piscataway, New Jersey

- Date: November 4
- Game time: 12:00 p.m.
- Game weather: Sunny • Temperature: 55 °F (13 °C) • Wind: SW at 4 miles per hour (6.4 km/h)
- Game attendance: 53,703
- Referee: Tim O'Dey
- TV announcers (CBS): Tom McCarthy (play-by-play), Ross Tucker (analyst), and Tiffany Blackmon (sideline reporter)
- Box score, Recap

Game information

First quarter

- (8:35) OSU – Gee Scott Jr. 14-yard pass from Kyle McCord, Jayden Fielding kick (Drive: 6 plays, 54 yards, 2:43; Ohio State 7–0)

Second quarter

- (7:49) RUT – Jai Patel 22-yard field goal (Drive: 10 plays, 76 yards, 5:24; Ohio State 7–3)
- (2:03) RUT – Jai Patel 21-yard field goal (Drive: 8 plays, 29 yards, 4:21; Ohio State 7–6)
- (0:01) RUT – Jai Patel 20-yard field goal (Drive: 9 plays, 44 yards, 1:45; Rutgers 9–7)

Third quarter

- (9:49) OSU – Jordan Hancock 93-yard interception return, Jayden Fielding kick (Ohio State 14–9)
- (2:39) OSU – TreVeyon Henderson 9-yard run, Jayden Fielding kick (Drive: 8 plays, 71 yards, 3:49; Ohio State 21–9)

Fourth quarter

- (14:07) RUT – JaQuae Jackson 19-yard pass from Gavin Wimsatt, Jai Patel kick (Drive: 6 plays, 75 yards, 3:32; Ohio State 21–16)
- (12:02) OSU – Marvin Harrison Jr. 4-yard pass from Kyle McCord, Jayden Fielding kick (Drive: 6 plays, 75 yards, 2:05; Ohio State 28–16)
- (2:07) OSU – Marvin Harrison Jr. 2-yard pass from Kyle McCord, Jayden Fielding kick (Drive: 6 plays, 17 yards, 2:09; Ohio State 35–16)

On November 4, Ohio State traveled to Piscataway to take on the Rutgers Scarlet Knights in front of an over-capacity crowd of 53,703 at SHI Stadium. Rutgers came into the game having clinched bowl eligibility for the first time since 2014 and having received votes in the AP poll for the first time since 2021. Ohio State had won all 9 of its previous meeting against Rutgers. Before the game, starting defensive backs Lathan Ransom and Denzel Burke were announced as out for the game. In addition, tight end Cade Stover did not play due to a knee injury.

Rutgers won the coin toss and deferred. The game started with a pair of three-and-outs by both teams. On Rutgers' first punt attempt, a botched snap led to a short punt and great field position for the Ohio State offense. Several positive carries by TreVeyon Henderson would get the Buckeyes into the redzone, where Kyle McCord would find tight end Gee Scott Jr. on a 14-yard touchdown pass to give Ohio State a 7–0 lead. Rutgers' next two drives would also end in three-and-outs, but Ohio State wouldn't find much offensive success either as McCord was out of sync with his receivers. On Rutgers' fourth drive, coach Greg Schiano would go for it on 4th-and-1 from the Rutgers 43, and Rutgers would use a fumblerooski trick play for a 45-yard pickup with running back Kyle Monangai. Rutgers' drive would reach the Ohio State 4, where on 4th-and-2 Rutgers opted to kick a field goal to cut the Ohio State lead to 7–3. After another Ohio State three-and-out, punter Jesse Mirco attempted to run an uncalled fake punt, but Rutgers snuffed it out, giving them great field position in Ohio State territory. Ohio State would stop the Rutgers drive near the goal line again, and Rutgers would kick another field goal to make it a one-point game, 7–6. McCord would look to lead a scoring drive before halftime, but instead threw an interception to linebacker Mohamed Toure on the second play of the drive. Scarlet Knights quarterback Gavin Wimsatt would drive Rutgers down to the Ohio State 2 with several crisp passes, but once again couldn't find the endzone and Rutgers settled for a 20-yard field goal, which Jai Patel made to give Rutgers a 9–7 lead heading into halftime.

Rutgers would pick up where they left off on their first drive of the second half, with Wimsatt drawing several pass interference calls on Ohio State DBs and Monangai picking up yards in chunks. On 2nd and 7 from the Ohio State 20, Wimsatt would attempt to find Monangai over the middle, but a hard hit by safety Josh Proctor caused the ball to be tipped up in the air, which was snatched by corner Jordan Hancock and returned 93 yards for a pick-six to give Ohio State a 14–9 lead. Proctor suffered an injury on the play and would not return to the game, with freshman safety Malik Hartford playing the remainder of the game in his stead. After a Rutgers punt, McCord and Henderson would engineer a scoring drive, with McCord completing two passes to Carnell Tate and picking up a first down on a quarterback sneak, and Henderson capping the drive with a 9-yard touchdown run to give Ohio State a 21–9 lead. Rutgers would respond with their own scoring drive, with Wimsatt completing passes of 35 and 19 yards to receivers Christian Dremel and JaQuae Jackson, the latter of which was a touchdown catch to cut the Ohio State lead to 21–16. On Ohio State's ensuing drive, McCord would find Henderson on a 3rd-and-9 checkdown, who made several defenders miss en route to a 65-yard scamper down to the Rutgers 9, the longest play allowed by Rutgers all season. McCord would cap the drive by finding Marvin Harrison Jr. in the endzone for a 4-yard touchdown which extended Ohio State's lead to 28–16. Rutgers' next drive would reach the Ohio State 6, aided by penalties on Mike Hall Jr. and Tyleik Williams, but Ohio State's defense would hold firm and sack Wimsatt on 4th down, forcing a turnover on downs. After a punt and another turnover on downs by Rutgers, McCord would ice the game with another touchdown pass to Harrison Jr., a 2-yarder that put the final score at 35–16.

Harrison Jr.'s 25 receiving yards in the game moved him past Santonio Holmes to become eighth all-time in receiving yards at Ohio State, and his two touchdowns moved him past Holmes into a tie with Cris Carter for fourth all-time in receiving touchdowns.

Statistics	OSU	RUTG
First downs	15	22
Plays–yards	55–328	68–361
Rushes–yards	29–139	43–232
Passing yards	189	129
Passing: comp–att–int	19–26–1	10–25–1
Time of possession	24:24	35:36

Team	Category	Player	Statistics
Ohio State	Passing	Kyle McCord	19/26, 189 yards, 3 TD, 1 INT
Ohio State	Rushing	TreVeyon Henderson	22 carries, 128 yards, 1 TD
Ohio State	Receiving	TreVeyon Henderson	5 receptions, 80 yards
Rutgers	Passing	Gavin Wimsatt	10/25, 129 yards, 1 TD, 1 INT
Rutgers	Rushing	Kyle Monangai	24 carries, 159 yards
Rutgers	Receiving	Christian Dremel	5 receptions, 69 yards

=== vs Michigan State ===
Michigan State Spartans (3–6) vs No. 1 Ohio State Buckeyes (9–0) – Game summary

Quarter	1	2	3	4	Total
Spartans	0	3	0	0	3
No. 1 Buckeyes	14	21	3	0	38

at Ohio Stadium • Columbus, Ohio

- Date: November 11
- Game time: 7:30 p.m.
- Game weather: Cloudy • Temperature: 45 °F (7 °C) • Wind: W at 7 miles per hour (11 km/h)
- Game attendance: 105,137
- Referee: Mark Kluczynski
- TV announcers (NBC): Noah Eagle (play-by-play), Todd Blackledge (analyst), and Kathryn Tappen (sideline reporter)
- Box score, Recap

Game information

First quarter

- (11:20) OSU – Marvin Harrison Jr. 19-yard run, Jayden Fielding kick (Drive: 8 plays, 75 yards, 3:40; Ohio State 7–0)
- (6:56) OSU – Marvin Harrison Jr. 26-yard pass from Kyle McCord, Jayden Fielding kick (Drive: 4 plays, 61 yards, 1:30; Ohio State 14–0)

Second quarter

- (14:58) OSU – Marvin Harrison Jr. 9-yard pass from Kyle McCord, Jayden Fielding kick (Drive: 13 plays, 84 yards, 5:37; Ohio State 21–0)
- (5:38) MSU – Jonathan Kim 53-yard field goal (Drive: 6 plays, 19 yards, 2:32; Ohio State 21–3)
- (3:30) OSU – TreVeyon Henderson 9-yard run, Jayden Fielding kick (Drive: 6 plays, 70 yards, 2:08; Ohio State 28–3)
- (0:15) OSU – Cade Stover 18-yard pass from Kyle McCord, Jayden Fielding kick (Drive: 8 plays, 74 yards, 1:26; Ohio State 35–3)

Third quarter

- (11:56) OSU – Jayden Fielding 36-yard field goal (Drive: 5 plays, 59 yards, 1:34; Ohio State 38–3)

Fourth quarter

- No scoring plays

On November 11, Ohio State hosted the Michigan State Spartans in a primetime matchup before a crowd of 105,137 at Ohio Stadium. Ohio State came into the game having won seven straight matchups against the Spartans, although Michigan State had knocked off the unbeaten Buckeyes twice in 2013 and 2015. Ohio State's injuries for the game included linebacker Tommy Eichenberg and safeties Lathan Ransom and Josh Proctor.

Michigan State won the coin toss and deferred. Ohio State would engineer an efficient first drive, with Kyle McCord hitting Cade Stover on two passes and TreVeyon Henderson creating chunk plays with his legs before Marvin Harrison Jr. would score a rushing touchdown on an end-around, the first rushing touchdown of his collegiate career, which gave Ohio State a 7–0 lead. Michigan State would respond by completing two chunk passes to get into Buckeye territory, where a long 56-yard field goal attempt would be missed by kicker Jonathan Kim. Ohio State would take advantage of the good field position by completing two more passes to Stover before McCord lofted a perfect pass to Harrison Jr. for a 26-yard touchdown, increasing the Buckeye lead to 14–0. After a Spartan punt, Ohio State would drive down the field once again, with Harrison Jr. catching passes of 25, 12, and 9 yards, the last of which was a touchdown to give Ohio State a 21–0 lead. After a trade of punts, Michigan State would start a drive with good field position, and would cash it into points with a 53-yard field goal by Kim to cut the Buckeye lead to 21–3. Ohio State's next drive would result in another touchdown as McCord completed three straight first-down passes to Harrison Jr., Emeka Egbuka, and Xavier Johnson before Henderson scored from 9 yards out to extend the Ohio State lead to 28–3. After an MSU punt, McCord would lead a touchdown drive before halftime, completing passes to four different receivers before hitting Stover on an 18-yard strike to give Ohio State a 35–3 lead heading into the break.

After a Michigan State three-and-out entering the half, McCord would launch a 57-yard deep ball to Harrison Jr. on Ohio State's first play of the second half. That would set up a 36-yard field goal by Jayden Fielding to extend Ohio State's lead to 38–3. The rest of the game would proceed mostly uneventfully, as Ohio State would pull their starters to maintain player health, with true freshman quarterback Lincoln Kienholz seeing his first snaps of his Ohio State career, and true freshman tight end Jelani Thurman catching his first two career passes, both from Kienholz. Fielding would miss a 42-yard field goal early in the fourth quarter to keep the score at 38–3, which would be the final score.

Harrison Jr.'s 149 receiving yards allowed him to move past K. J. Hill, Cris Carter, and Gary Williams to become fifth all-time in receiving yards at Ohio State.

Statistics	MSU	OSU
First downs	11	25
Plays–yards	54–182	66–530
Rushes–yards	29–94	32–177
Passing yards	88	353
Passing: comp–att–int	13–25–0	26–34–0
Time of possession	28:48	31:12

Team	Category	Player	Statistics
Michigan State	Passing	Katin Houser	12/24, 92 yards
Michigan State	Rushing	Nate Carter	11 carries, 52 yards
Michigan State	Receiving	Christian Fitzpatrick	2 receptions, 23 yards
Ohio State	Passing	Kyle McCord	24/31, 335 yards, 3 TD
Ohio State	Rushing	TreVeyon Henderson	13 carries, 63 yards, 1 TD
Ohio State	Receiving	Marvin Harrison Jr.	7 receptions, 149 yards, 2 TD

=== vs Minnesota ===
Minnesota Golden Gophers (5–5) vs No. 2 Ohio State Buckeyes (10–0) – Game summary

Quarter	1	2	3	4	Total
Golden Gophers	0	0	0	3	3
No. 2 Buckeyes	7	6	17	7	37

at Ohio Stadium • Columbus, Ohio

- Date: November 18
- Game time: 4:00 p.m.
- Game weather: Sunny • Temperature: 49 °F (9 °C) • Wind: S at 4 miles per hour (6.4 km/h)
- Game attendance: 104,019
- Referee: Kole Knueppel
- TV announcers (BTN): Cory Provus (play-by-play), Jake Butt (analyst), and Brooke Fletcher (sideline reporter)
- Box score, Recap

Game information

First quarter

- (9:22) OSU – TreVeyon Henderson 9-yard run, Jayden Fielding kick (Drive: 8 plays, 85 yards, 4:02; Ohio State 7–0)

Second quarter

- (13:05) OSU – Jayden Fielding 47-yard field goal (Drive: 9 plays, 58 yards, 2:46; Ohio State 10–0)
- (4:51) OSU – Jayden Fielding 26-yard field goal (Drive: 11 plays, 81 yards, 4:24; Ohio State 13–0)

Third quarter

- (14:48) OSU – TreVeyon Henderson 75-yard run, Jayden Fielding kick (Drive: 1 play, 75 yards, 0:12; Ohio State 20–0)
- (13:53) OSU – Marvin Harrison Jr. 4-yard pass from Kyle McCord, Jayden Fielding kick (Drive: 3 plays, 6 yards, 0:43; Ohio State 27–0)
- (10:17) OSU – Jayden Fielding 32-yard field goal (Drive: 5 plays, 15 yards, 1:13; Ohio State 30–0)

Fourth quarter

- (13:43) OSU – Cade Stover 1-yard pass from Kyle McCord, Jayden Fielding kick (Drive: 16 plays, 84 yards, 9:18; Ohio State 37–0)
- (6:43) MINN – Dragan Kesich 54-yard field goal (Drive: 12 plays, 39 yards, 7:00; Ohio State 37–3)

On November 18, Ohio State hosted the Minnesota Golden Gophers in their final home game of the year before a crowd of 104,019 at Ohio Stadium. The game served as Ohio State's Senior Day, where 21 seniors were honored. Ohio State had not lost to Minnesota since 2000, when Glen Mason defeated John Cooper. Ohio State's injuries for the game included backup quarterback Devin Brown, linebacker Tommy Eichenberg, defensive tackle Mike Hall Jr., and safety Lathan Ransom.

Minnesota won the coin toss and elected to receive. Minnesota's first drive resulted in a three-and-out after quarterback Athan Kaliakmanis was brought down on a third-down scramble by defensive tackle Tyleik Williams. Ohio State would lean heavily on the run game to start, with TreVeyon Henderson and Chip Trayanum accounting for 60 yards before Henderson would score on a 9-yard touchdown run to give Ohio State a 7–0 lead. After a few punts, the Buckeyes would start a drive at their own 13 and drive into Gopher territory with Kyle McCord completing chunk passes to Marvin Harrison Jr. and Emeka Egbuka. From there, McCord would become erratic, missing Harrison Jr. on two straight throws before throwing a near-interception to defensive lineman Danny Strigham. Jayden Fielding would kick a 47-yard field goal to increase the Buckeye lead to 10–0. After another punt, Ohio State would be pinned deep again, but McCord would continue to find Egbuka to drive down the field, which would eventually result in a 26-yard field goal by Fielding to increase Ohio State's lead to 13–0. There would be no more scoring in the first half, but on the final play of the half, McCord would be sacked by defensive lineman Jah Joyner and would come up limping; he would not miss any time because of his injury.

On the first play of the second half, Henderson broke free and ran along the left sideline for a 75-yard touchdown, the longest of his career, which extended the lead to 20–0. On the very next play, Kaliakmanis would be strip-sacked by defensive end Jack Sawyer, which would be recovered by his teammate JT Tuimoloau inside the Minnesota 10. That set up a touchdown pass from McCord to Harrison Jr. a few plays later to extend the Buckeye lead to 27–0. Ohio State's defense would create another turnover on the next drive, with Jordan Hancock intercepting a pass from Kaliakmanis and giving the Buckeyes great field position again. Fielding would hit a 32-yard field goal on the ensuing drive to give Ohio State a 30–0 lead. After another punt, Ohio State would embark on a scoring drive lasting over 9 minutes. The drive would result in a 1-yard touchdown pass from McCord to Cade Stover to give Ohio State a 37–0 lead. Minnesota would break the shutout on their next drive facing Ohio State's backups, with kicker Dragan Kesich hitting a long-range 54-yard field goal to give Minnesota their only points of the day, with the final score finishing at 37–3.

Statistics	MINN	OSU
First downs	10	23
Plays–yards	48–159	67–434
Rushes–yards	29–70	35–215
Passing yards	89	219
Passing: comp–att–int	11–19–1	22–32–0
Time of possession	28:38	31:22

Team	Category	Player	Statistics
Minnesota	Passing	Athan Kaliakmanis	11/19, 89 yards, 1 INT
Minnesota	Rushing	Jordan Nubin	19 carries, 49 yards
Minnesota	Receiving	Corey Crooms Jr.	2 receptions, 42 yards
Ohio State	Passing	Kyle McCord	20/30, 212 yards, 2 TD
Ohio State	Rushing	TreVeyon Henderson	15 carries, 146 yards, 2 TD
Ohio State	Receiving	Emeka Egbuka	5 receptions, 83 yards

=== at Michigan (rivalry) ===
No. 2 Ohio State Buckeyes (11–0) at No. 3 Michigan Wolverines (11–0) – Game summary

Quarter	1	2	3	4	Total
No. 2 Buckeyes	3	7	7	7	24
No. 3 Wolverines	7	7	10	6	30

at Michigan Stadium • Ann Arbor, Michigan

- Date: November 25
- Game time: 12:00 p.m.
- Game weather: Sunny, 35 °F (2 °C)
- Game attendance: 110,615
- Referee: Ron Snodgrass
- TV announcers (FOX): Gus Johnson (play-by-play), Joel Klatt (analyst), Jenny Taft (sideline reporter), and Tom Rinaldi (sideline reporter)
- Box score, Recap

Game information

First quarter

- (5:36) MICH – Blake Corum 1-yard run, James Turner kick (Drive: 4 plays, 7 yards, 1:56; Michigan 7–0)
- (2:13) OSU – Jayden Fielding 43-yard field goal (Drive: 9 plays, 51 yards, 3:23; Michigan 7–3)

Second quarter

- (10:22) MICH – Roman Wilson 22-yard pass from J. J. McCarthy, James Turner kick (Drive: 14 plays, 75 yards, 6:51; Michigan 14–3)
- (6:27) OSU – Emeka Egbuka 3-yard pass from Kyle McCord, Jayden Fielding kick (Drive: 7 plays, 73 yards, 3:50; Michigan 14–10)

Third quarter

- (11:43) MICH – James Turner 50-yard field goal (Drive: 6 plays, 46 yards, 3:10; Michigan 17–10)
- (5:35) OSU – TreVeyon Henderson 3-yard run, Jayden Fielding kick (Drive: 12 plays, 75 yards, 6:08; Tied 17–17)
- (1:55) MICH – Blake Corum 22-yard run, James Turner kick (Drive: 7 plays, 75 yards, 3:40; Michigan 24–17)

Fourth quarter

- (11:57) MICH – James Turner 38-yard field goal (Drive: 7 plays, 44 yards, 4:00; Michigan 27–17)
- (8:05) OSU – Marvin Harrison Jr. 14-yard pass from Kyle McCord, Jayden Fielding kick (Drive: 8 plays, 65 yards, 3:52; Michigan 27–24)
- (1:05) MICH – James Turner 37-yard field goal (Drive: 13 plays, 56 yards, 7:00; Michigan 30–24)

On November 25, Ohio State traveled to Ann Arbor to take on their arch-rival Michigan Wolverines in the 119th edition of The Game. Entering the matchup, Ohio State trailed the all-time series 60-51-6. Ohio State looked to snap Michigan's two-game winning streak in the rivalry. Due to the ongoing Michigan Wolverines football sign-stealing scandal, Michigan head coach Jim Harbaugh was suspended from coaching during the game, with offensive coordinator Sherrone Moore serving as the acting head coach in his stead.

The game began with Michigan winning the coin toss and deferring. The first four drives of the game each ended in punts, with the two teams combining for just one first down. On the first play of Ohio State's third drive, Kyle McCord threw an inaccurate pass to a well-covered Marvin Harrison Jr., which was intercepted by Michigan's Will Johnson and returned to the Ohio State 7. Michigan would then use four straight runs by Blake Corum to find the endzone first and take a 7–0 lead. Ohio State would respond on its next drive with a 24-yard pass from McCord to Harrison Jr. as well as taking advantage of a facemask penalty by Michigan's Derrick Moore to kick a 43-yard field goal and cut the deficit to 7–3. Michigan would respond with a 14-play touchdown drive, with J. J. McCarthy completing several passes to tight ends Colston Loveland and AJ Barner before threading a pass to Roman Wilson in the endzone which was upheld after a replay review. The touchdown extended Michigan's lead to 14–3. Ohio State would respond quickly, with McCord completing all four of his passing attempts on the next drive, the last of which was a short touchdown pass to Emeka Egbuka to cut the Wolverine lead to 14–10. Ohio State would force a punt on Michigan's next drive after McCarthy was sacked by Mike Hall Jr. and Jack Sawyer, but Michigan punter Tommy Doman delivered a good punt to the Ohio State 2. Ohio State's next drive would feature a 44-yard pass from McCord to Harrison Jr. Facing 4th-and-2 from the Michigan 34, coach Ryan Day opted to let the clock run down and try a 52-yard field goal with Jayden Fielding, which he missed wide left, keeping the halftime score at 14–10 in favor of Michigan.

Michigan would open the second half with a quick strike from McCarthy to Loveland, followed by a 20-yard run out of the wildcat by backup quarterback Alex Orji. That set up a 50-yard field goal by Michigan kicker James Turner, which he made to increase Michigan's lead to 17–10. Ohio State would respond with two chunk passes to Harrison Jr. and Egbuka to reach Michigan territory, after which they would call eight straight run plays, challenging Michigan's strong interior defensive line. The eight plays resulted in three first downs and a touchdown run by TreVeyon Henderson, tying the game at 17. Michigan would respond quickly, with McCarthy continuing to find his tight ends for chunk gains. However, star Michigan guard Zak Zinter broke two bones in his leg during the drive. On the first play after the injury, Corum would break free for a 22-yard touchdown to give Michigan a 24–17 lead. Ohio State's ensuing drive would yield just one yard, and they were forced to punt back to the Wolverines. McCarthy would complete a 34-yard pass to Loveland to enter the Ohio State redzone, but the Buckeyes were able to force a 38-yard field goal by Turner, which he made to extend the Michigan lead to 27–17. After a kickoff out of bounds by Doman, Ohio State embarked on a touchdown drive featuring a 28-yard pass from McCord to Julian Fleming, a 3rd-and-8 conversion run by Xavier Johnson, and a 14-yard touchdown pass from McCord to Harrison Jr., which cut the lead to 27–24. With 8 minutes left to play, Michigan looked to run the clock down, and they were able to do so with a series of Corum runs and short passes by McCarthy to Cornelius Johnson. The drive ended with a 37-yard field goal by Turner to increase the Michigan lead to 30–24 with just over a minute remaining, giving the Buckeye offense one more chance to win the game.

Ohio State's final drive began with a kickoff return by Johnson to the Ohio State 19, followed by an incomplete pass from McCord to Cade Stover. McCord would then hit Harrison Jr. on a 22-yard completion. On the next play, McCord would find Fleming over the middle for a 21-yard completion, but Josh Wallace would knock the ball out, and Egbuka would fall on it. The play triggered a lengthy replay review which eventually upheld the ruling on the field of a catch and fumble. On the first play after the replay review, Michigan edge rusher Jaylen Harrell would beat Ohio State guard Donovan Jackson and pressure McCord, which caused him to underthrow a pass intended for Harrison Jr., which was intercepted by Michigan safety Rod Moore, securing Michigan's 30–24 victory.

The loss marked Ohio State's third straight in the rivalry, the first time since 1997 that the Buckeyes lost three straight games to their arch-rivals. The loss also effectively ended Ohio State's College Football Playoff hopes. Harrison Jr.'s touchdown saw him finish his career with 31 touchdown catches, third in Ohio State history, only behind Chris Olave (35) and David Boston (34).

Statistics	OSU	MICH
First downs	22	18
Plays–yards	58–378	60–338
Rushes–yards	28–107	38–156
Passing yards	271	182
Passing: comp–att–int	18–30–2	17–21–0
Time of possession	26:32	33:28

Team	Category	Player	Statistics
Ohio State	Passing	Kyle McCord	18/30, 271 yards, 2 TD, 2 INT
Ohio State	Rushing	TreVeyon Henderson	19 carries, 60 yards, 1 TD
Ohio State	Receiving	Marvin Harrison Jr.	5 receptions, 118 yards, 1 TD
Michigan	Passing	J. J. McCarthy	16/20, 148 yards, 1 TD
Michigan	Rushing	Blake Corum	22 carries, 88 yards, 2 TD
Michigan	Receiving	Colston Loveland	5 receptions, 88 yards

=== vs. Missouri (Cotton Bowl Classic) ===
2023 Cotton Bowl Classic
No. 9 Missouri Tigers (10–2) vs. No. 7 Ohio State Buckeyes (11–1) – Game summary

Quarter	1	2	3	4	Total
No. 9 Tigers	0	0	0	14	14
No. 7 Buckeyes	3	0	0	0	3

at AT&T Stadium • Arlington, Texas

- Date: December 29
- Game time: 8:00 p.m.
- Game weather: None (indoor stadium)
- Game attendance: 70,114
- Referee: Derek Anderson
- TV announcers (ESPN): Dave Pasch (play-by-play), Dusty Dvoracek (analyst), and Tom Luginbill (sideline reporter)
- Box score, Recap

Game information

First quarter

- (3:12) OSU – Jayden Fielding 44-yard field goal (Drive: 5 plays, 27 yards, 2:35; Ohio State 3–0)

Second quarter

- No scoring plays

Third quarter

- No scoring plays

Fourth quarter

- (14:55) MIZZ – Cody Schrader 7-yard run, Harrison Mevis kick (Drive: 8 plays, 95 yards, 4:30; Missouri 7–3)
- (5:12) MIZZ – Luther Burden III 7-yard pass from Brady Cook, Harrison Mevis kick (Drive: 13 plays, 91 yards, 6:10; Missouri 14–3)

After falling to seventh in the final College Football Playoff rankings, Ohio State was selected to play in the 2023 Cotton Bowl Classic against the ninth-ranked Missouri Tigers on December 29. After Kyle McCord announced his transfer to Syracuse following the end of the regular season, backup Devin Brown was set to make his first career start, the first-ever Ohio State QB to make his first career start in a bowl game. Ohio State's opt-outs for the game included star wide receiver Marvin Harrison Jr. and linebacker Tommy Eichenberg. The game was the 13th all-time meeting between the Buckeyes and Tigers, with Ohio State leading the series 10–1–1.

The teams traded punts to begin the game, with Missouri driving into Buckeye territory before stalling out. Ohio State would record two first downs on its second drive before punting again, with Jesse Mirco pinning the Tigers at their own 10. The Buckeye defense forced a quick punt, followed by two successful runs by TreVeyon Henderson bringing the Buckeyes to the Missouri 26. However, Brown would then be sacked by unblocked Missouri defender Jaylon Carlies and would suffer a lower-body injury on the play; he would play only one more drive before exiting the game. True freshman Lincoln Kienholz would play the rest of the game at quarterback for the Buckeyes. Ohio State ended the drive with a 44-yard field goal by Jayden Fielding, which was good to give Ohio State a 3–0 lead. Neither team would score for the remainder of the half, with the Buckeye offense spending most of the half in the shadow of their own endzone while Missouri crossed midfield thrice but were unable to score. Missouri kicker Harrison Mevis was set to attempt a 65-yard field goal in the final seconds of the half, but the Tigers were penalized for a delay of game, and so the Tigers did not score before halftime, with Ohio State holding a 3–0 edge.

Ohio State forced a Missouri three-and-out on the first drive of the second half, with a Jack Sawyer sack of Missouri quarterback Brady Cook the primary cause. Ohio State's first offensive play was a 24-yard completion from Kienholz to Xavier Johnson bringing the Buckeyes to the Missouri 32, but the drive stalled from there, resulting in a 48-yard field goal attempt by Fielding, which he missed after hitting the left upright. After another punt, Ohio State crossed midfield again on their next drive, but their offensive line's struggles in pass protection led to the drive stalling. The Tigers offense finally hit a big play on the ensuing drive as Cook connected with Marquis Johnson on a 50-yard pass to bring Missouri into the red zone. The drive ended with a 7-yard touchdown run by Cody Schrader to give Missouri a 7–3 lead. Ohio State's next drive reached the Missouri 40, but ended with another punt. On Missouri's ensuing drive, Cook connected with Theo Wease Jr. on a 27-yard completion after the Buckeyes jumped offsides, and Missouri pushed the ball downfield and finished with a 7-yard passing touchdown from Cook to Luther Burden III, extending the Tigers' lead to 14–3. With time dwindling down, Ohio State's offense reached Missouri territory again, but Kienholz was strip-sacked by Missouri's Daylan Carnell, a turnover which was confirmed on review. The Buckeyes would not see the ball again and the game ended with Missouri defeating Ohio State, 14–3.

The loss marked the second year in a row Ohio State finished their season with back-to-back losses, and dropped the Buckeyes' record against SEC teams in bowl games to 2–13. Brown would not start another game for Ohio State as he remained the backup for the entire 2024 season before transferring to Cal the following offseason.

Statistics	MIZZ	OSU
First downs	19	12
Plays–yards	71–331	57–203
Rushes–yards	49–203	33–97
Passing yards	128	106
Passing: comp–att–int	11–18–0	10–24–0
Time of possession	33:53	26:07

Team	Category	Player	Statistics
Missouri	Passing	Brady Cook	11/18, 128 yards, 1 TD
Missouri	Rushing	Cody Schrader	29 carries, 128 yards, 1 TD
Missouri	Receiving	Marquis Johnson	1 reception, 50 yards
Ohio State	Passing	Lincoln Kienholz	6/17, 86 yards
Ohio State	Rushing	TreVeyon Henderson	19 carries, 72 yards
Ohio State	Receiving	Emeka Egbuka	6 receptions, 63 yards

== Rankings ==
Ranking movements Legend: ██ Increase in ranking ██ Decrease in ranking ( ) = First-place votes
	Week															
Poll	Pre	1	2	3	4	5	6	7	8	9	10	11	12	13	14	Final
AP	3 (1)	5	6	6	4 (1)	4 (1)	3 (1)	3 (1)	3 (3)	3 (3)	3 (3)	3 (1)	2 (1)	6	7	10
Coaches	4 (1)	4	4	4 (1)	3 (2)	3 (2)	3 (2)	3 (1)	3 (2)	3 (3)	3 (5)	3 (3)	2 (1)	6	7	10
CFP	Not released									1	1	2	2	6	7	Not released

== Personnel ==
=== Roster ===
2023 Ohio State Buckeyes football team roster
Players
Coaches
Offense

Pos.	#	Name	Class
WR	0	Xavier Johnson (C)	GS
WR	2	Emeka Egbuka	Jr
RB	3	Miyan Williams (injured)	Sr
WR	4	Julian Fleming	Sr
RB	5	Dallan Hayden	So
QB	6	Kyle McCord	Jr
WR	7	Kyion Grayes (injured)	So
TE	8	Cade Stover (C)	Sr
WR	9	Jayden Ballard	Jr
WR	11	Brandon Inniss	Fr
QB	12	Lincoln Kienholz	Fr
QB	13	Tristan Gebbia	GS
WR	14	Kojo Antwi	So
TE	15	Jelani Thurman	Fr
QB	16	Mason Maggs	So
WR	17	Carnell Tate	Fr
WR	18	Marvin Harrison Jr.	Jr
QB	19	Chad Ray	Sr
RB	19	Chip Trayanum	Sr
RB	21	Evan Pryor	Jr
WR	24	Nolan Baudo (injured)	Fr
WR	25	Kai Saunders	So
RB	26	Cayden Saunders	Jr
RB	28	TC Caffey (injured)	So
RB	30	Will Hartson	Fr
RB	32	TreVeyon Henderson	Jr
QB	33	Devin Brown	So
WR	34	Brennen Schramm	Fr
TE	46	Jace Middleton	Jr
TE	49	Patrick Gurd	Sr
OL	51	Luke Montgomery	Fr
OL	54	Toby Wilson	Jr
OL	55	Matthew Jones	GS
OL	59	Victor Cutler Jr.	GS
OL	62	Joshua Padilla	Fr
OL	63	Julian Goines-Jackson	So
OL	64	Quinton Burke	Sr
OL	65	Zen Michalski	Jr
OL	66	Enokk Vimahi	Sr
OL	67	Austin Siereveld	Fr
OL	68	George Fitzpatrick	So
OL	69	Trey Leroux	Sr
OL	70	Josh Fryar	Sr
OL	71	Josh Simmons	Jr
OL	72	Avery Henry	So
OL	73	Grant Toutant	Sr
OL	74	Donovan Jackson	Jr
OL	75	Carson Hinzman	So
OL	76	Miles Walker	Fr
OL	77	Tegra Tshabola	So
OL	78	Jakob James	Sr
WR	80	Noah Rogers	Fr
TE	81	Sam Hart	Jr
WR	82	David Adolph	So
WR	83	Joop Mitchell (injured)	Jr
TE	84	Joe Royer	Sr
TE	85	Bennett Christian (S)	So
WR	86	Bryson Rodgers	Fr
WR	87	Reis Stocksdale (injured)	Jr
TE	88	Gee Scott Jr.	GS
TE	89	Zak Herbstreit (injured)	Jr

Defense

Pos.	#	Name	Class
CB	1	Davison Igbinosun	So
LB	2	Kourt Williams II	GS
S	3	Cameron Martinez	Sr
CB	4	Lorenzo Styles Jr.	Jr
S	6	Sonny Styles	So
CB	7	Jordan Hancock	Jr
S	8	Lathan Ransom	Sr
CB	10	Denzel Burke	Jr
LB	11	C. J. Hicks	So
CB	12	Ryan Turner	So
S	13	Kye Stokes	So
S	14	Ja'Had Carter	Sr
CB	15	Calvin Simpson-Hunt	Fr
LB	17	Mitchell Melton	Sr
CB	18	Jyaire Brown	So
LB	20	Arvell Reese	Fr
S	21	Jayden Bonsu (injured)	Fr
LB	22	Steele Chambers	GS
DE	23	Omari Abor	So
CB	24	Jermaine Mathews Jr.	Fr
S	25	Malik Hartford	Fr
S	26	Cedrick Hawkins	Fr
LB	28	Reid Carrico	Jr
LB	30	Cody Simon	Sr
S	32	Brenton "Inky" Jones	So
DE	33	Jack Sawyer	Jr
CB	34	Colin Kaufmann	So
LB	35	Tommy Eichenberg (C)	GS
LB	36	Gabe Powers	So
LB	37	Nigel Glover	Fr
DB	38	Cameron Kittle	Sr
S	39	Andrew Moore	Jr
S	41	Josh Proctor	GS
CB	43	Dianté Griffin	So
DE	44	JT Tuimoloau	Jr
S	46	Ryan Rudzinski	Fr
LB	50	Alec DelSignore	Fr
DT	51	Mike Hall Jr.	Jr
DE	52	Joshua Mickens	Fr
DL	53	Will Smith Jr.	Fr
DL	56	Kayden McDonald	Fr
LB	57	Jalen Pace	Jr
DT	58	Ty Hamilton	Sr
DL	60	Cade Casto	Jr
DE	61	Caden Davis	Fr
DL	62	Bryce Prater	Jr
DT	90	Jaden McKenzie	Sr
DT	91	Tyleik Williams	Jr
DE	92	Caden Curry	So
DT	93	Hero Kanu	So
DL	94	Jason Moore	Fr
DT	95	Tywone Malone Jr.	Jr
DE	97	Kenyatta Jackson Jr.	So

Special teams

Pos.	#	Name	Class
K	23	Parker Lewis	Sr
P	29	Jesse Mirco	Jr
K	38	Jayden Fielding	So
P	42	Joe McGuire	Fr
LS	43	John Ferlmann	Jr
LS	48	Max Lomonico	Jr
K	95	Casey Magyar	Jr
LS	96	Collin Johnson	Jr
K	98	Austin Snyder	Jr

Head coach

- Ryan Day

Coordinators/assistant coaches

- Brian Hartline – Offensive coordinator/wide receivers
- Jim Knowles – Defensive coordinator/linebackers
- Larry Johnson – Associate head coach/defensive line
- Tony Alford – Assistant head coach for offense/running backs
- Justin Frye – Run game coordinator/offensive line
- Tim Walton – Secondary coach/cornerbacks
- Perry Eliano – Safeties
- Mickey Marotti – Associate AD/director of football sport performance
- Corey Dennis – Quarterbacks
- Parker Fleming – Special teams coordinator
- Keenan Bailey – Tight ends
- Joe Philbin – Senior advisor & analyst - Offense
- Mike Dawson – Senior advisor & analyst - Defense
- Todd Fitch – Senior analyst - Offense
- Rob Keys – Quality control - Kicking
- Sam McGrath – Quality control - Defense
- Joe Lyberger – Quality control - Kicking
- Riley Larkin – Program assistant - Offense
- Gunner Daniel – Program assistant - Special teams
- Devin Jordan – Program assistant - Offense
- Gerren Duhart – Program assistant - Defense
- Joshua Chorba – Program assistant - Defense
- James Laurinaitis – Graduate student coach - Defense
- LaAllan Clark – Graduate student coach - Defense
- Mike Sollenne – Graduate student coach - Offense
- Sean Binckes – Graduate student coach - Offense

Legend

- (C) Team captain
- (S) Suspended
- (I) Ineligible
- Injured
- Redshirt

Roster
Last update: October 9, 2023

=== Staff ===
Coach	Title	Years at Ohio State
Ryan Day	Head coach	7th
Gene Smith	Vice president / athletic director	19th
Mickey Marotti	Assistant athletic director for football sports performance	14th
Tony Alford	Assistant head coach for offense / running game coordinator / running backs coach	9th
Justin Frye	Associate head coach for offense / offensive line	2nd
Larry Johnson	Associate head coach / defensive line coach	10th
Brian Hartline	Offensive coordinator / wide receivers coach	7th
Jim Knowles	Defensive coordinator / linebackers coach	2nd
Parker Fleming	Special teams coordinator	8th
Keenan Bailey	Tight ends coach	8th
Corey Dennis	Quarterbacks coach	9th
Tim Walton	Secondary coach / Cornerbacks coach	2nd
Perry Eliano	Safeties coach	2nd
Todd Fitch	Offensive analyst	3rd
James Laurinaitis	Graduate assistant (LB)	1st
Mike Sollenne	Graduate assistant (OL)	2nd
Sam McGrath	Quality control (Defense)	2nd
Brent Zdebski	Quality control (Defense)	2nd
Sean Binckes	Graduate assistant (Offense)	1st
LaAllan Clark	Graduate assistant (DL)	1st
Gunner Daniel	Special teams assistant	1st

==== Coaching staff departures ====
Name	Position	Following Team	Following Position
Kevin Wilson	Offensive coordinator / Tight ends coach	Tulsa	Head coach
Matt Guerrieri	Senior advisor / analyst	Indiana	Co-Defensive Coordinator / Safeties coach

=== Transfers ===
==== Transfers out ====
The Buckeyes lost fourteen players to the transfer portal.

Name	Number	Pos.	Height	Weight	Year	Hometown	Transfer to
Mason Arnold	#94	LS	6'0	228	Sophomore	Tampa, Florida	Michigan State
Kaleb Brown	#13	WR	5'10	197	Freshman	Chicago, Illinois	Iowa
Caleb Burton	#12	WR	5'11	169	Sophomore	Austin, Texas	Auburn
Ben Christman	#71	OL	6'6	315	Junior	Akron, Ohio	Kentucky
Jantzen Dunn	#24	S	6'1	192	Sophomore	Bowling Green, Kentucky	Kentucky
Blaize Exline	#80	WR	5'10	175	Freshman	Salem, Ohio	Youngstown State
Javontae Jean-Baptiste	#8	DE	6'5	249	Graduate	Spring Valley, New York	Notre Dame
Jaylen Johnson	#25	S	6'1	211	Sophomore	Cincinnati, Ohio	Memphis
JK Johnson	#4	CB	6'0	179	Sophomore	St. Louis, Missouri	LSU
Jackson Kuwatch	#50	6'4	6'4	236	Sophomore	Cincinnati, Ohio	Miami (OH)
Lloyd McFarquhar	#42	CB	5'10	180	Graduate	Cleveland, Ohio	Rice
Teradja Mitchell	#3	LB	6'2	239	Graduate	Virginia Beach, Virginia	Florida
Michael O'Shaugnessy	#96	P	6'3	205	Senior	New Albany, Ohio	Michigan State
Jake Seibert	#98	K	6'1	205	Senior	Cincinnati, Ohio	Northern Illinois

==== Transfers in ====
The Buckeyes added nine players via transfer.

Name	Number	Pos.	Height	Weight	Year	Hometown	Transfer from
Ja'Had Carter	#14	S	6'1	203	Senior	Richmond, Virginia	Syracuse
Victor Cutler Jr.	#59	OL	6'3	300	Graduate	West Monroe, Louisiana	Louisiana–Monroe
John Ferlmann	#43	LS	6'2	228	Junior	Phoenix, Arizona	Arizona State
Tristan Gebbia	#13	QB	6'2	210	Graduate	Calabasas, California	Oregon State
Davison Igbinosun	#1	CB	6'2	190	Sophomore	Union, New Jersey	Ole Miss
Casey Magyar	#95	K	5'10	189	Junior	Dublin, Ohio	Kent State
Tywone Malone	#95	DT	6'4	303	Junior	Jamesburg, New Jersey	Ole Miss
Josh Simmons	#71	OL	6'5	310	Junior	San Diego, California	San Diego State
Lorenzo Styles Jr.	#4	CB	6'1	195	Junior	Pickerington, Ohio	Notre Dame

=== Players drafted into the NFL ===
Round	Pick	NFL team	Player	Position
1	2	Houston Texans	C. J. Stroud	QB
1	6	Arizona Cardinals	Paris Johnson Jr.	OT
1	20	Seattle Seahawks	Jaxon Smith-Njigba	WR
3	75	Atlanta Falcons	Zach Harrison	DE
4	111	Cleveland Browns	Dawand Jones	OT
6	190	Cleveland Browns	Luke Wypler	C

== Statistics ==
=== Individual leaders ===
==== Offense ====
Passing statistics
#	NAME	POS	RAT	CMP	ATT	YDS	AVG/G	CMP%	TD	INT	LONG
6	Kyle McCord	QB	83.8	211	318	2,899	263.5	66.4%	22	4	75
33	Devin Brown	QB	11.8	12	22	197	39.4	54.5%	2	1	58

Rushing statistics
#	NAME	POS	ATT	GAIN	AVG	TD	LONG	AVG/G

Receiving statistics
#	NAME	POS	CTH	YDS	AVG	TD	LONG	AVG/G

==== Defense ====
Defense statistics

Key: POS: Position, SOLO: Solo Tackles, AST: Assisted Tackles, TOT: Total Tackles, TFL: Tackles-for-loss, SACK: Quarterback Sacks, INT: Interceptions, BU: Passes Broken Up, PD: Passes Defended, QBH: Quarterback Hits, FR: Fumbles Recovered, FF: Forced Fumbles, BLK: Kicks or Punts Blocked, SAF: Safeties, TD : Touchdown

==== Special teams ====
Kicking statistics

Kickoff statistics
#	NAME	POS	KICKS	YDS	AVG	TB	OB

Punting statistics
#	NAME	POS	PUNTS	YDS	AVG	LONG	TB	FC	I–20	50+	BLK

Kick return statistics
#	NAME	POS	RTNS	YDS	AVG	TD	LNG

Punt return statistics
#	NAME	POS	RTNS	YDS	AVG	TD	LONG

=== Scoring ===
==== Ohio State vs. non-conference opponents ====
	1	2	3	4	Total
Ohio State	21	52	21	21	115
Opponents	10	7	7	7	31

==== Ohio State vs. Big Ten opponents ====
	1	2	3	4	Total
Ohio State	54	61	75	65	255
Opponents	10	24	14	23	71

==== Ohio State vs. all opponents ====
	1	2	3	4	Total
Ohio State	75	113	96	86	370
Opponents	20	31	21	30	102

=== Awards and honors ===
==== Weekly Individual Awards ====
Big Ten Weekly Honors
Date	Player	Position	Award
Week 4	Lathan Ransom	SAF	Defensive Player of the Week
Week 6	Josh Proctor	SAF	Defensive Player of the Week
Week 6	Marvin Harrison Jr.	WR	Offensive Player of the Week
Week 8	Marvin Harrison Jr.	WR	Co-offensive Player of the Week

National Weekly Honors
Date	Player	Position	Award
Week 10	Jordan Hancock	SAF	Thorpe Award National DB of the Week

==== Individual Yearly Awards ====
National Awards
Award	Player	Position
Jim Thorpe Award Semifinalist	Denzel Burke	CB
Fred Biletnikoff Award Finalist	Marvin Harrison Jr.	WR
Walter Camp Award Semifinalist	Marvin Harrison Jr.	WR
Mackey Award Finalist	Cade Stover	TE
Broyles Award Semifinalist	Jim Knowles	Coach

==== Big Ten Conference ====
Big Ten Awards
Award	Player	Position
USA Today Big Ten Player of the Year	Marvin Harrison Jr.	WR
Butkus-Fitzgerald Linebacker of the Year	Tommy Eichenberg	LB
Kwalick-Clark Tight End of the Year	Cade Stover	TE
Richter–Howard Receiver of the Year	Marvin Harrison Jr.	WR
Graham–George Offensive Player of the Year	Marvin Harrison Jr.	WR

All-Big Ten Team
Award	Player	Position
1st Team	Tommy Eichenberg	LB
1st Team	JT Tuimoloau	DE
1st Team	Denzel Burke	CB
1st Team	Marvin Harrison Jr.	WR
1st Team	TreVeyon Henderson	RB
1st Team	Cade Stover	TE
1st Team	Donovan Jackson	OG
1st Team	Josh Fryar	OT
2nd Team	Jack Sawyer	DE
2nd Team	Tyleik Williams	DT
2nd Team	Jayden Fielding	K
2nd Team	Matthew Jones	OG
3rd Team	Kyle McCord	LB
3rd Team	Emeka Egbuka	LB
3rd Team	Steele Chambers	LB
3rd Team	Josh Proctor	S
3rd Team	Mike Hall Jr.	DT
Honorable Mention	Davison Igbinosun	CB
Honorable Mention	Lathan Ransom	S
Honorable Mention	Sonny Styles	S
Honorable Mention	Ty Hamilton	DT
