= Dallan Hayden =

American football player (born 2003)

Memphis Tigers
- Position: Running back
- Class: Junior

Personal information
- Born: June 22, 2003 (age 23); Memphis, Tennessee, U.S.
- Listed height: 5 ft 10 in (1.78 m)
- Listed weight: 203 lb (92 kg)

Career information
- High school: Christian Brothers (Memphis)
- College: Ohio State (2022–2023); Colorado (2024–2025); Memphis (2026–present)
- Stats at ESPN

Dallan Hayden (born June 22, 2003) is an American college football running back for the Memphis Tigers. He previously played for the Ohio State Buckeyes and Colorado Buffaloes.

== Early life ==
Hayden attended Christian Brothers High School in Memphis, Tennessee. Over his junior and senior seasons, he rushed for 4,012 yards and 57 touchdowns combined and was named Tennessee's Mr. Football both years. He committed to Ohio State University to play college football.

== College career ==
=== Ohio State ===
As a true freshman at Ohio State in 2022, Hayden earned playing time alongside TreVeyon Henderson and Miyan Williams.

On April 8, 2024, Hayden announced that he would enter the transfer portal.

=== Colorado ===
On April 22, 2024, Hayden announced that he would transfer to Colorado.

On December 26, 2025, Hayden announced that he would enter the transfer portal for the second time.

=== Statistics ===
Year	Team	Games		Rushing			Receiving		
Year	Team	GP	Att	Yds	Avg	TD	Rec	Yds	TD
2022	Ohio State	10	111	553	5.0	5	4	23	0
2023	Ohio State	3	19	110	5.8	1	1	−2	0
2024	Colorado	11	64	196	3.1	1	17	132	0
2025	Colorado	10	70	326	4.7	1	4	15	0
Career		34	264	1,185	4.5	8	26	168	0

== Personal life ==
His father, Aaron Hayden, played for the University of Tennessee and in the National Football League (NFL).
