= Tywone Malone Jr. =

American football player (born 2003)

Profile
- Position: Defensive tackle

Personal information
- Born: May 2, 2003 (age 23)
- Listed height: 6 ft 4 in (1.93 m)
- Listed weight: 309 lb (140 kg)

Career information
- High school: Bergen Catholic (Oradell, New Jersey)
- College: Ole Miss (2021–2022); Ohio State (2023–2025)
- NFL draft: 2026: undrafted

Career history
- Carolina Panthers (2026)*
- * Offseason or practice squad member only

Awards and highlights
- CFP national champion (2024)

Tywone Elijah Malone Jr. (born May 2, 2003) is an American football defensive tackle. He played college football for the Ohio State Buckeyes and for the Ole Miss Rebels.

== Early life ==
Raised in Jamesburg, New Jersey, Malone Jr. attended Bergen Catholic High School in Bergen County, New Jersey. Coming out of high school, he was rated as a four-star recruit, the 6th best defensive tackles, and the 62nd overall prospect in the class of 2021 by 247Sports, and committed to play college baseball and college football for the Ole Miss Rebels over offers from other schools such as Florida State, Tennessee, Texas A&M, Rutgers, and USC.

== College baseball career ==
During his time at Ole Miss, Malone Jr. also played baseball, recording five hits and three home runs over 22 plate appearances in 13 games. He also helped the Rebels win a National Championship in 2022.

== College football career ==
=== Ole Miss ===
As a freshman in 2021, Malone Jr. played in one game, racking up three tackles with one being for a loss and a sack. In the 2022 Texas Bowl, he recorded a sack against Texas Tech. During the 2022 season, Malone Jr. notched ten tackles with one being for a loss, a sack, and two pass deflections. After the conclusion of the season, he entered the NCAA transfer portal.

=== Ohio State ===
Malone Jr. transferred to play solely football for the Ohio State Buckeyes. During his three-year career at Ohio State from 2023 to 2025, he totaled 39 tackles with one and a half being for a loss, and two pass deflections.

== Professional career ==
Pre-draft measurables
Height	Weight	Arm length	Hand span	Wingspan	40-yard dash	10-yard split	20-yard split	20-yard shuttle	Three-cone drill	Vertical jump	Broad jump	Bench press
6 ft 4 1/8 in (1.93 m)	305 lb (138 kg)	33 in (0.84 m)	8 3/4 in (0.22 m)	6 ft 7 1/8 in (2.01 m)	5.12 s	1.87 s	3.07 s	5.00 s	8.38 s	27.0 in (0.69 m)	7 ft 10 in (2.39 m)	22 reps
All values from Pro Day

After not being selected in the 2026 NFL draft, Malone Jr. signed with the Carolina Panthers as an undrafted free agent on May 18, 2026. He was waived by the Panthers as a part of preliminary roster cuts on August 29.
