= Rob Keys =

American football coach (born c. 1973)

Current position
- Title: Special teams coordinator
- Team: Ohio State
- Conference: Big Ten

Biographical details
- Born: c. 1973 (age 52–53); Jefferson, Pennsylvania, U.S.
- Education: West Virginia University (1996, 1998); Marine Military Academy

Playing career
- 1994–1995: West Virginia

Coaching career (HC unless noted)
- 1996–1998: West Virginia (GA)
- 1999: Glenville State (co-DC/ST/DB)
- 2000–2004: Findlay (co-DC/ST/DB)
- 2005: Indiana State (ST/S)
- 2006–2009: Slippery Rock (ST/DB)
- 2010: New Hampshire (DB)
- 2011–2021: Findlay
- 2022–2024: Ohio State (KQC)
- 2025–present: Ohio State (ST)

Head coaching record
- Overall: 66–42
- Tournaments: 1–2 (NCAA D-II playoffs)

Accomplishments and honors

Championships
- 1 G-MAC (2021)* As assistant CFP national champion (2024)

Awards
- As coach: G-MAC Coach of the Year (2021); Division II Region Three Coach of the Year (2021)

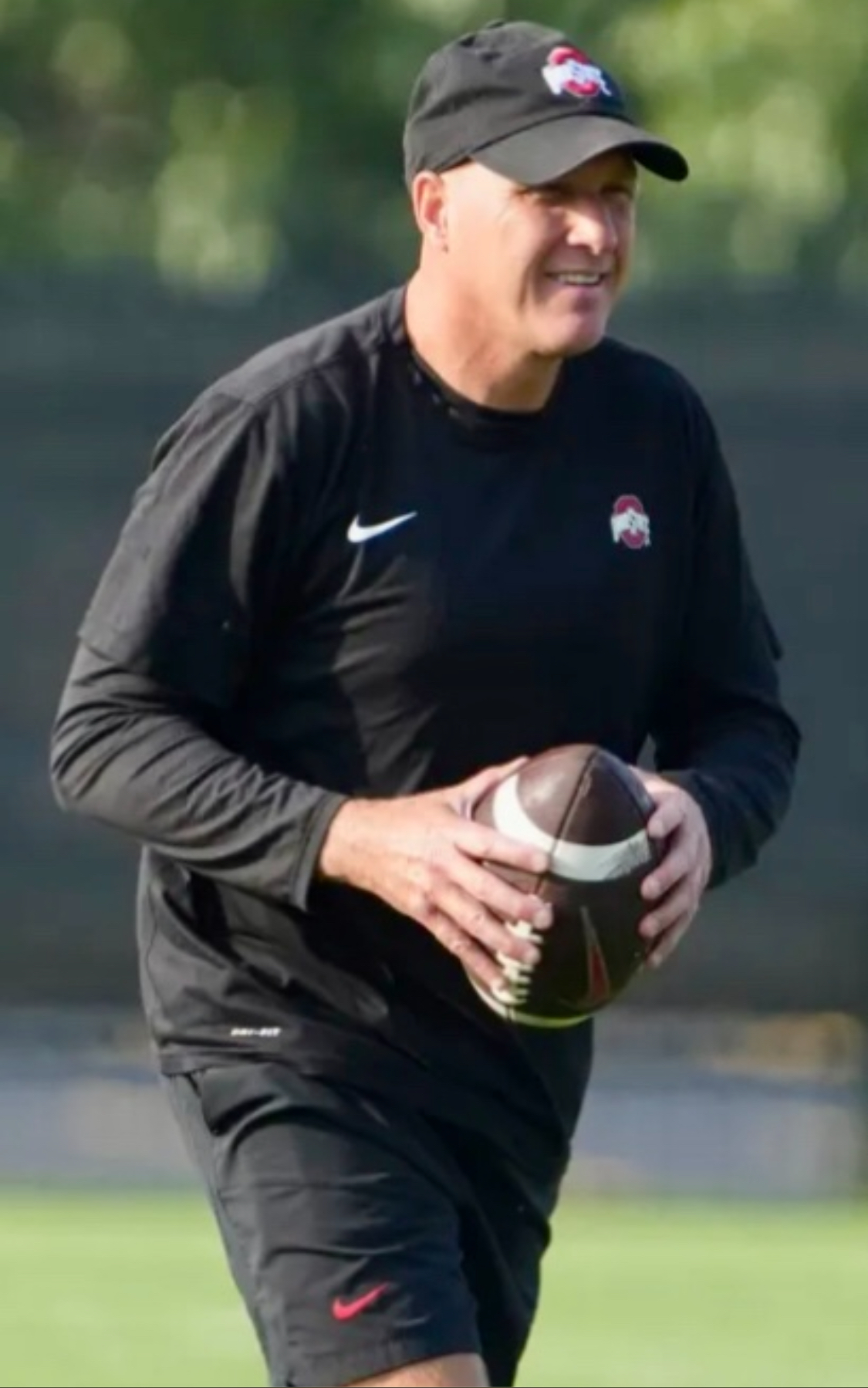
Rob Keys

Rob Keys (born c. 1973) is an American college football coach. He is the special teams coordinator for Ohio State University, a position he has held since 2024. He was the head football coach for the University of Findlay from 2011 to 2021. He also coached for West Virginia, Glenville State, Indiana State, Slippery Rock, and New Hampshire. He played college football for West Virginia.

== Head coaching record ==
Year	Team	Overall	Conference	Standing	Bowl/playoffs	AFCA^{#}
Findlay Oilers (Great Lakes Intercollegiate Athletic Conference) (2011–2016)
2011	Findlay	6–5	6–4	T–3rd (South)		
2012	Findlay	7–3	7–3	T–2nd (South)		
2013	Findlay	8–3	6–3	2nd (South)		
2014	Findlay	5–6	4–6	T–7th		
2015	Findlay	6–5	5–5	T–6th		
2016	Findlay	6–5	6–5	7th		
Findlay Oilers (Great Midwest Athletic Conference) (2017–2021)
2017	Findlay	10–3	6–1	2nd	L Division II Second Round	22
2018	Findlay	8–3	6–2	T–2nd		
2019	Findlay	7–4	5–2	3rd		
2020–21	Findlay	3–2*	3–2*	T–2nd		
2021	Findlay	0–3*	0–1*	1st	L Division II First Round* (Appearance vacated)	
Findlay:		66–42	54—34			
Total:		66–42				
National championship Conference title Conference division title or championship game berth

*Wins vacated in 2023 due to NCAA Infractions
