= Davison Igbinosun =

American football player (born 2004)

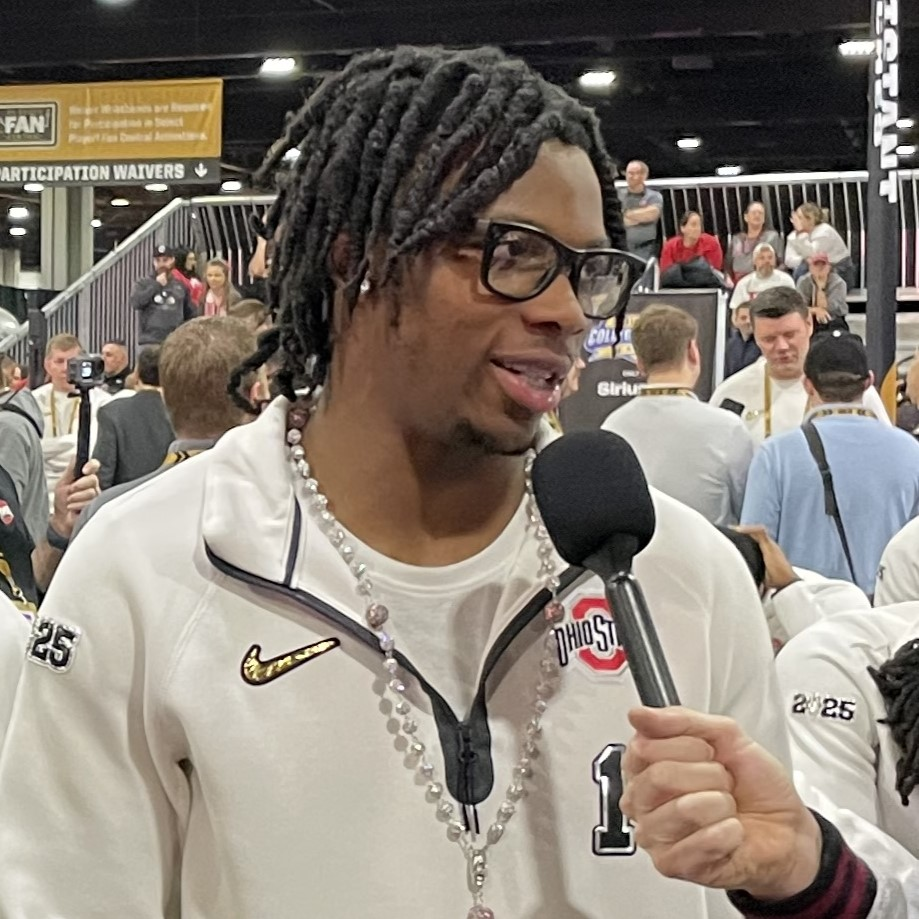
- Igbinosun talking to press ahead of the 2025 CFP National Championship.

No. 21 – Buffalo Bills
- Position: Cornerback
- Roster status: Active

Personal information
- Born: April 11, 2004 (age 22)
- Listed height: 6 ft 2 in (1.88 m)
- Listed weight: 193 lb (88 kg)

Career information
- High school: Union (Union Township, Union County, New Jersey)
- College: Ole Miss (2022); Ohio State (2023–2025)
- NFL draft: 2026: 2nd round, 62nd overall pick

Career history
- Buffalo Bills (2026–present)

Awards and highlights
- CFP national champion (2024); First-team All-Big Ten (2025)

Career NFL statistics as of Week 11, 2026
- Tackles: 38
- Pass deflections: 13
- Interceptions: 2
- Stats at Pro Football Reference

Aimuamwosa Davison Igbinosun (born April 11, 2004) is an American professional football cornerback for the Buffalo Bills of the National Football League (NFL). Nicknamed "IGB" He played college football for the Ole Miss Rebels and Ohio State Buckeyes and was selected by the Bills in the second round of the 2026 NFL draft.

== Early life ==
Igbinosun attended Union High School in Union Township, New Jersey. He was a dual-threat player, rushing for 894 yards and 11 touchdowns on 75 carries in his career. He also brought in 25 passes for 492 yards and three touchdowns. However, he was even better on defense tallying 211 tackles, six going for a loss, seven interceptions, 19 pass deflections, two fumble recoveries, one forced fumble, and a blocked field goal. He committed to play college football at Ole Miss over other schools such as Notre Dame, Tennessee, Vanderbilt, Indiana, Virginia, Wake Forest, Duke, Pittsburgh, Boston College, Virginia Tech, Cincinnati, Kentucky, and Rutgers.

College recruiting
Name	Hometown	School	Height	Weight	Commit date
Davison Igbinosun; CB	Union, New Jersey	Union	6 ft 1 in (1.85 m)	185 lb (84 kg)	Jan 8, 2022
Davison Igbinosun; CB	Recruit ratings: Rivals: 247Sports: ESPN:				

== College career ==
As a freshman, Igbinosun performed well in Ole Miss' fall camp leading him to play in 13 games starting in ten. On the year he put up 37 tackles and five pass deflections, earning Freshman All-American honors by College Football News. After the season, Igbinosun entered the NCAA transfer portal. He ultimately transferred to the Ohio State Buckeyes.

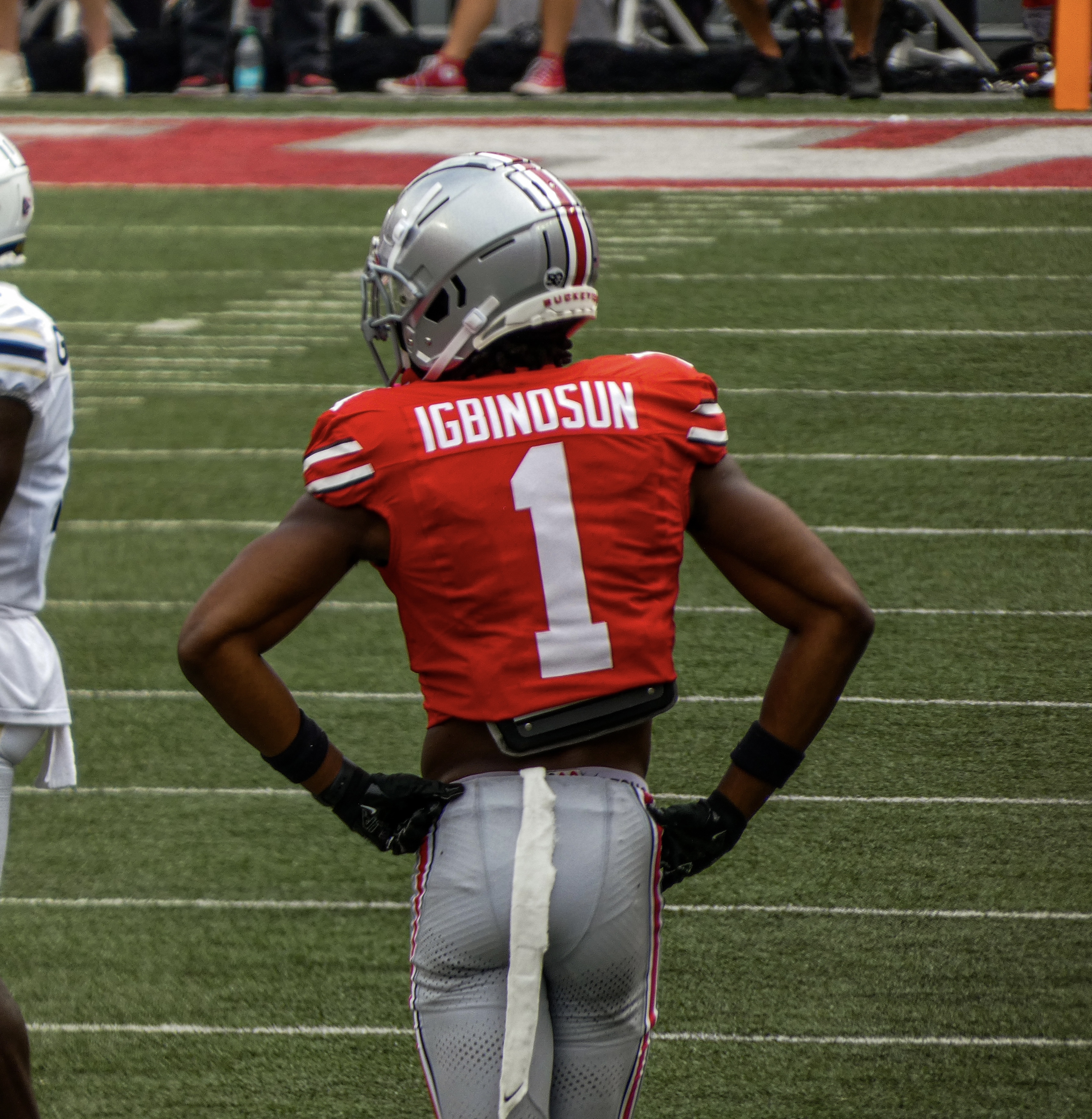
Igbinosun during a 2024 with Ohio State.

After his transfer, Igbinosun became a starting cornerback for Ohio State, earning honorable mention all-Big Ten honors. He started all thirteen games in his sophomore season with the Buckeyes, leading the team with seven tackles in their loss during the 2023 Cotton Bowl Classic.

As a junior, Igbinosun would be a part of the 2025 National Champion Ohio State Buckeyes football team. Igbinosun started in sixteen games throughout the season, recording forty-five tackles and two interceptions. After the season, he opted to return to Ohio State for his senior year.

== Professional career ==
Pre-draft measurables
Height	Weight	Arm length	Hand span	Wingspan	40-yard dash	10-yard split	20-yard split	20-yard shuttle	Three-cone drill	Vertical jump	Broad jump
6 ft 2 1/8 in (1.88 m)	189 lb (86 kg)	32 7/8 in (0.84 m)	9 1/8 in (0.23 m)	6 ft 6 5/8 in (2.00 m)	4.45 s	1.58 s	2.63 s	4.32 s	7.07 s	35.0 in (0.89 m)	10 ft 4 in (3.15 m)
All values from NFL Combine/Pro Day

Igbinosun was drafted by the Buffalo Bills in the second round with the 62nd overall pick in the 2026 NFL draft. In Week 8 against the Baltimore Ravens, Igbinosun recorded his first career interception off Joe Fagnano in a 36–10 win.

== Personal life ==
His brother Desmond plays college football for the Rutgers Scarlet Knights. Igbinosun is of Nigerian descent.
