= Josh Proctor =

American football player (born 1999)

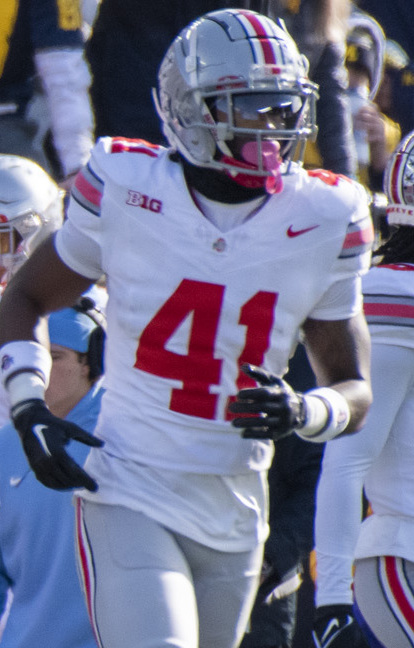
- Proctor with the Ohio State Buckeyes in 2023

Profile
- Position: Safety

Personal information
- Born: March 27, 1999 (age 27); Owasso, Oklahoma, U.S
- Listed height: 6 ft 1 in (1.85 m)
- Listed weight: 199 lb (90 kg)

Career information
- High school: Owasso
- College: Ohio State (2018–2023)
- NFL draft: 2024: undrafted

Career history
- Jacksonville Jaguars (2024)*; DC Defenders (2025); Calgary Stampeders (2026)*
- * Offseason or practice squad member only

Awards and highlights
- Third-team All-Big Ten (2023)

Josh Proctor (born March 27, 1999) is an American professional football safety. He played college football for the Ohio State Buckeyes.

== Early life ==
Proctor attended Owasso High School in Owasso, Oklahoma. In Procter's high school career, he played on offense and defense. On offense he rushed for 318 yards and four touchdowns, he also added 19 receptions for 199 yards and a touchdown. On defense he tallied 40 tackles, five interceptions, and two pick sixes. He also returned a kickoff for a touchdown. Proctor committed to play college football at Ohio State.

== College career ==
As a freshman in 2018, Proctor tallied one tackle against Nebraska. In the 2019 season opener, Proctor recorded his first career interception as helped Ohio State beat Florida Atlantic 45–21. Proctor finished the 2019 season with 13 tackles, three pass deflections, and an interception. In 2020, Proctor recovered a fumble in the season-opening win over Nebraska. In the 2020 Big Ten Football Championship Game, Proctor had an interception as the Buckeyes beat Northwestern 22–10. Proctor started in the 2021 College Football Playoff National Championship, where he totaled five tackles, but Ohio State lost to Alabama 52–24. Proctor finished the 2020 season with 20 tackles with one being for a loss, a pass deflection, an interception, and a fumble recovery. For his performance on the 2020 season, Proctor was named an honorable mention All-Big Ten selection. In week two, Proctor suffered a fractured leg against Oregon, forcing him to miss the remainder of the 2021 season. In just two games in the 2021 season, Proctor recorded ten tackles. Proctor finished the 2022 season with 21 tackles with 1.5 going for a loss, a sack, and two pass deflections. Proctor announced that he would return to Ohio State for a sixth season in 2023.

== Professional career ==
Pre-draft measurables
Height	Weight	Arm length	Hand span	Wingspan	40-yard dash	10-yard split	20-yard split	20-yard shuttle	Three-cone drill	Vertical jump	Broad jump
6 ft 1 1/2 in (1.87 m)	199 lb (90 kg)	32 in (0.81 m)	8 3/4 in (0.22 m)	6 ft 6 in (1.98 m)	4.55 s	1.54 s	2.62 s	4.32 s	7.07 s	32.5 in (0.83 m)	10 ft 1 in (3.07 m)
All values from NFL Combine/Pro Day

=== Jacksonville Jaguars ===
Proctor signed with the Jacksonville Jaguars as an undrafted free agent on April 30, 2024. He was waived on August 27.

=== DC Defenders ===
On December 5, 2024, Proctor signed with the DC Defenders of the United Football League (UFL). He was released on March 20, 2025, and re-signed on April 8. He was released again on May 12, 2025, and re-signed again on May 14. He was released on May 20.

=== Calgary Stampeders ===
On January 7, 2026, Proctor signed with the Calgary Stampeders. He was released on May 13.
