= Steele Chambers =

American football player (born 2000)

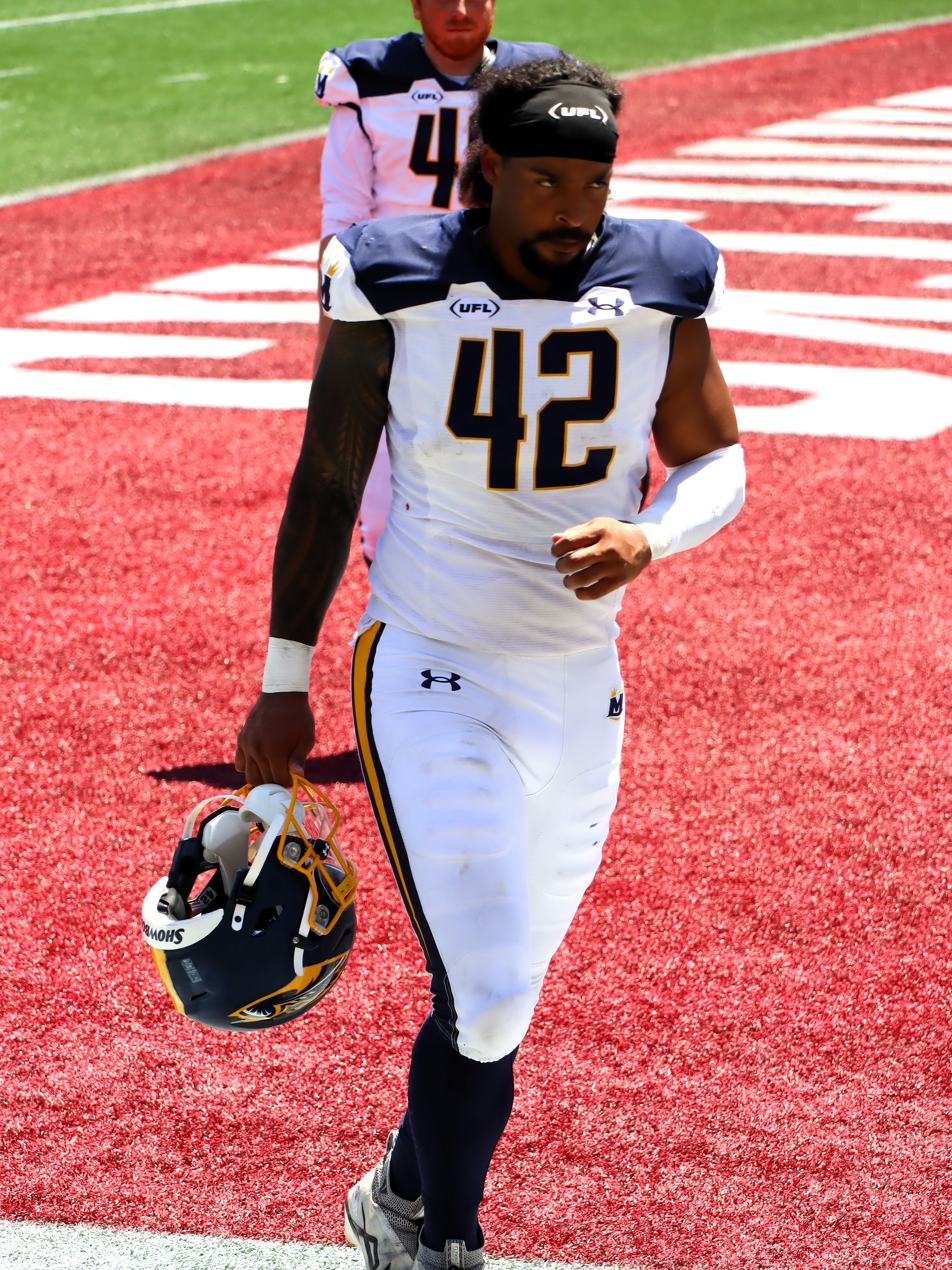
- Chambers with the Memphis Showboats in 2025

No. 42 – Louisville Kings
- Position: Linebacker
- Roster status: Active

Personal information
- Born: July 24, 2000 (age 26); Atlanta, Georgia, U.S.
- Listed height: 6 ft 1 in (1.85 m)
- Listed weight: 240 lb (109 kg)

Career information
- High school: Blessed Trinity (Roswell, Georgia)
- College: Ohio State (2019–2023)
- NFL draft: 2024: undrafted

Career history
- Detroit Lions (2024)*; New England Patriots (2024)*; Memphis Showboats (2025); Louisville Kings (2026–present)
- * Offseason or practice squad member only

Awards and highlights
- UFL champion (2026); Third-team All-Big Ten (2023)
- Stats at Pro Football Reference

Steele Chambers (born July 24, 2000) is an American professional football linebacker for the Louisville Kings of the United Football League (UFL). He played college football at Ohio State.

== Early life ==
Chambers attended Blessed Trinity Catholic High School in Roswell, Georgia. He played linebacker and running back in high school, where he was a 4-star recruit. He committed to Ohio State University to play college football.

== College career ==
Chambers played running back his first two years at Ohio State in 2019 and 2020, before switching to linebacker prior to the 2021 season. As a running back he had 28 carries for 221 yards and one touchdown. In his first year as a linebacker, Chambers started four of 13 games and had 47 tackles, one sack and one interception. He returned to Ohio State as a starter in 2022.

== Professional career ==
Pre-draft measurables
Height	Weight	Arm length	Hand span	Wingspan	40-yard dash	10-yard split	20-yard split	20-yard shuttle	Three-cone drill	Vertical jump	Broad jump	Bench press
6 ft 0 3/4 in (1.85 m)	226 lb (103 kg)	30 1/2 in (0.77 m)	9 1/4 in (0.23 m)	6 ft 1 5/8 in (1.87 m)	4.77 s	1.68 s	2.76 s	4.23 s	7.10 s	33.5 in (0.85 m)	9 ft 7 in (2.92 m)	19 reps
All values from NFL Combine/Pro Day

=== Detroit Lions ===
On April 27, Chambers signed with the Detroit Lions as an undrafted free agent following the 2024 NFL draft. He was waived on June 10, 2024.

=== New England Patriots ===
On June 11, 2024, Chambers was claimed off waivers by the New England Patriots. He was released on August 26.

=== Memphis Showboats ===
On February 17, 2025, Chambers signed with the Memphis Showboats of the United Football League (UFL).

=== Louisville Kings ===
On January 13, 2026, Chambers was selected by the Louisville Kings in the 2026 UFL draft.
