= Lathan Ransom =

American football player (born 2002)

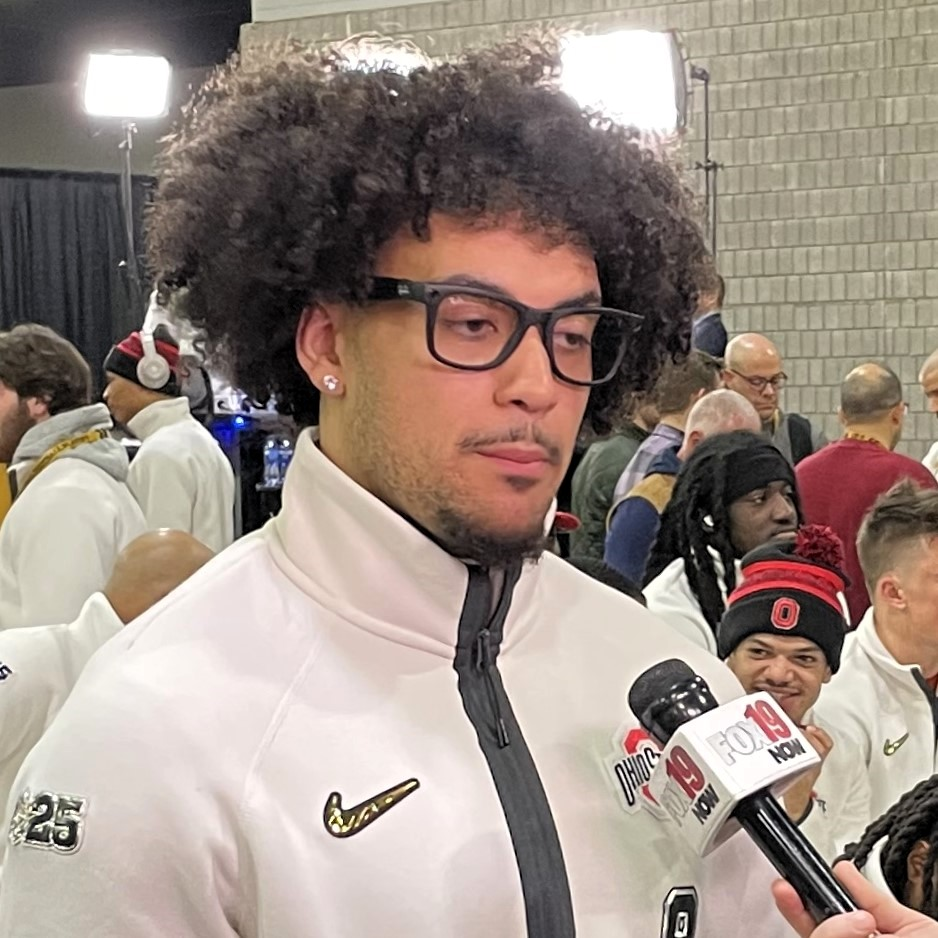
- Ransom talking to press ahead of the 2025 CFP National Championship

No. 22 – Carolina Panthers
- Position: Safety
- Roster status: Active

Personal information
- Born: July 16, 2002 (age 24)
- Listed height: 6 ft 0 in (1.83 m)
- Listed weight: 202 lb (92 kg)

Career information
- High school: Salpointe Catholic (Tucson, Arizona)
- College: Ohio State (2020–2024)
- NFL draft: 2025: 4th round, 122nd overall pick

Career history
- Carolina Panthers (2025–present)

Awards and highlights
- CFP national champion (2024); First-team All-Big Ten (2024)
- Stats at Pro Football Reference

Lathan Ransom (born July 16, 2002) is an American professional football safety for the Carolina Panthers of the National Football League (NFL). He played college football for the Ohio State Buckeyes and was selected by the Panthers in the fourth round of the 2025 NFL draft.

== Early life ==
Ransom attended Salpointe Catholic High School in Tucson, Arizona. He was selected to play in the 2020 All-American Bowl. He committed to Ohio State University to play college football.

== College career ==
As a freshman at Ohio State in 2020, Ransom played in seven games and had six tackles. As a sophomore in 2021, he played in 13 games and had 38 tackles and one sack. In the 2022 Rose Bowl, he suffered a broken leg. Ransom returned from the injury in time for the 2022 season. He was one of 12 semi-finalists for the Jim Thorpe Award.

== Professional career ==
Pre-draft measurables
Height	Weight	Arm length	Hand span	Wingspan	40-yard dash	10-yard split	20-yard split	20-yard shuttle	Vertical jump	Broad jump	Bench press
6 ft 0 1/4 in (1.84 m)	206 lb (93 kg)	30 1/2 in (0.77 m)	8 1/2 in (0.22 m)	6 ft 3 1/8 in (1.91 m)	4.53 s	1.57 s	2.65 s	4.26 s	36.5 in (0.93 m)	10 ft 1 in (3.07 m)	20 reps
All values from NFL Combine/Pro Day

Ransom was selected by the Carolina Panthers in the fourth round (122nd overall) at the 2025 NFL draft. He had his first career interception which was the game winning interception against the Tampa Bay Buccaneers on week 16 of the 2025 season.
