= Jordan Hancock =

American football player (born 2003)

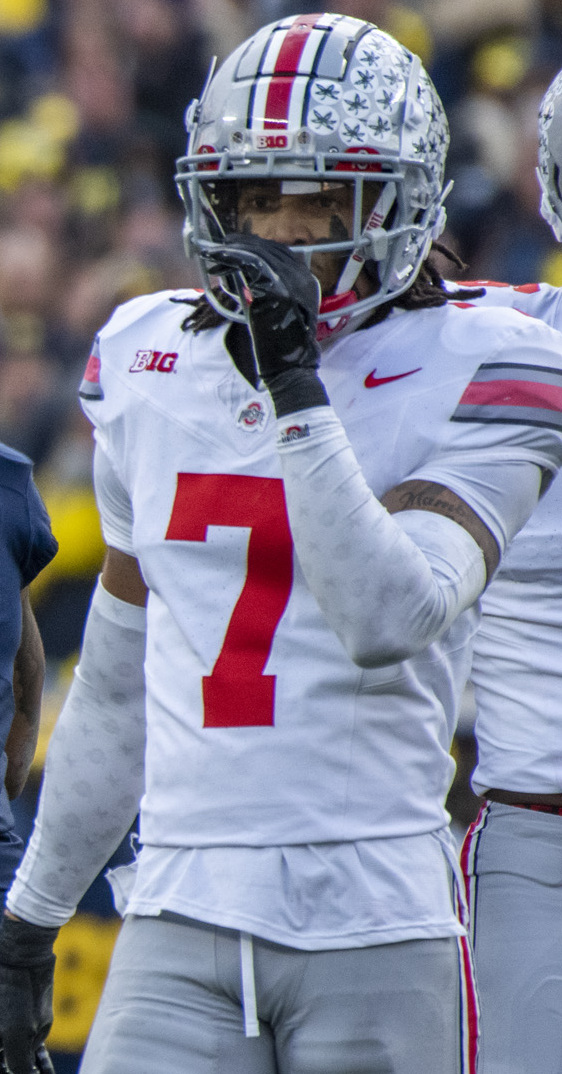
- Hancock with the Ohio State Buckeyes in 2023

No. 37 – Buffalo Bills
- Position: Safety
- Roster status: Active

Personal information
- Born: August 12, 2003 (age 23)
- Listed height: 6 ft 0 in (1.83 m)
- Listed weight: 195 lb (88 kg)

Career information
- High school: North Gwinnett (Suwanee, Georgia)
- College: Ohio State (2021–2024)
- NFL draft: 2025: 5th round, 170th overall pick

Career history
- Buffalo Bills (2025–present)

Career NFL statistics as of Week 11, 2026
- Tackles: 27
- Pass deflections: 1
- Stats at Pro Football Reference

Jordan Hancock (born August 12, 2003) is an American professional football safety for the Buffalo Bills of the National Football League (NFL). He played college football for the Ohio State Buckeyes and was selected by the Bills in the fifth round of the 2025 NFL draft.

== Early life ==
Hancock attended North Gwinnett High School in Suwanee, Georgia. As a junior, he totaled 15 tackles and two interceptions. Hancock originally committed to play college football for the Clemson Tigers before flipping his commitment to play for the Ohio State Buckeyes. Hancock was highly touted and was a consensus 4-star recruit.

== College career ==
As a freshman in 2021, Hancock appeared in seven games as a rotational cornerback and special-teamer, notching two tackles and a pass deflection. He missed the first six games of the 2022 season with a leg injury. Hancock made his first career start in week 10 of the 2022 season against Indiana, finishing the year with five tackles. In week 10 of the 2023 season, he notched his first career interception, which he returned 93 yards for a touchdown, in a win over Rutgers. For his performance, Hancock was named the Thorpe Award National Defensive Back of the Week. As a senior in 2024, Hancock started most of the season in the slot for Ohio State and won the 2025 College Football Playoff National Championship with the Buckeyes. His season stats included 48 combined tackles, 8 passes broken up and an interception.

== Professional career ==
Pre-draft measurables
Height	Weight	Arm length	Hand span	Wingspan	40-yard dash	10-yard split	20-yard split	Vertical jump	Broad jump	Bench press
6 ft 0 1/8 in (1.83 m)	195 lb (88 kg)	30 3/4 in (0.78 m)	8 5/8 in (0.22 m)	6 ft 4 1/8 in (1.93 m)	4.42 s	1.52 s	2.55 s	41.5 in (1.05 m)	10 ft 6 in (3.20 m)	14 reps
All values from NFL Combine/Pro Day

Hancock was selected in the fifth round by the Buffalo Bills with the 170th pick of the 2025 NFL draft.

== NFL career statistics ==
Legend
**Bold**	Career high

=== Regular season ===
Year	Team	Games		Tackles							Interceptions						Fumbles				
Year	Team	GP	GS	Cmb	Solo	Ast	TFL	QBH	Sck	Sfty	PD	Int	Yds	Y/I	Lng	TD	FF	FR	Yds	Y/R	TD
2025	BUF	13	0	**22**	**9**	**13**	0	0	0	0	0	0	0	—	0	0	0	0	0	—	0
2026	BUF	2	0	5	3	2	0	0	0	0	**1**	0	0	—	0	0	0	0	0	—	0
Career		15	0	27	12	15	0	0	0	0	1	0	0	0	0	0	0	0	0	0	0

=== Postseason ===
Year	Team	Games		Tackles							Interceptions						Fumbles				
Year	Team	GP	GS	Cmb	Solo	Ast	TFL	QBH	Sck	Sfty	PD	Int	Yds	Y/I	Lng	TD	FF	FR	Yds	Y/R	TD
2025	BUF	2	0	6	3	3	0	0	0	0	0	0	0	—	0	0	0	0	0	—	0
Career		2	0	6	3	3	0	0	0	0	0	0	0	—	0	0	0	0	0	—	0
