= Miyan Williams =

American football player (born 2001)

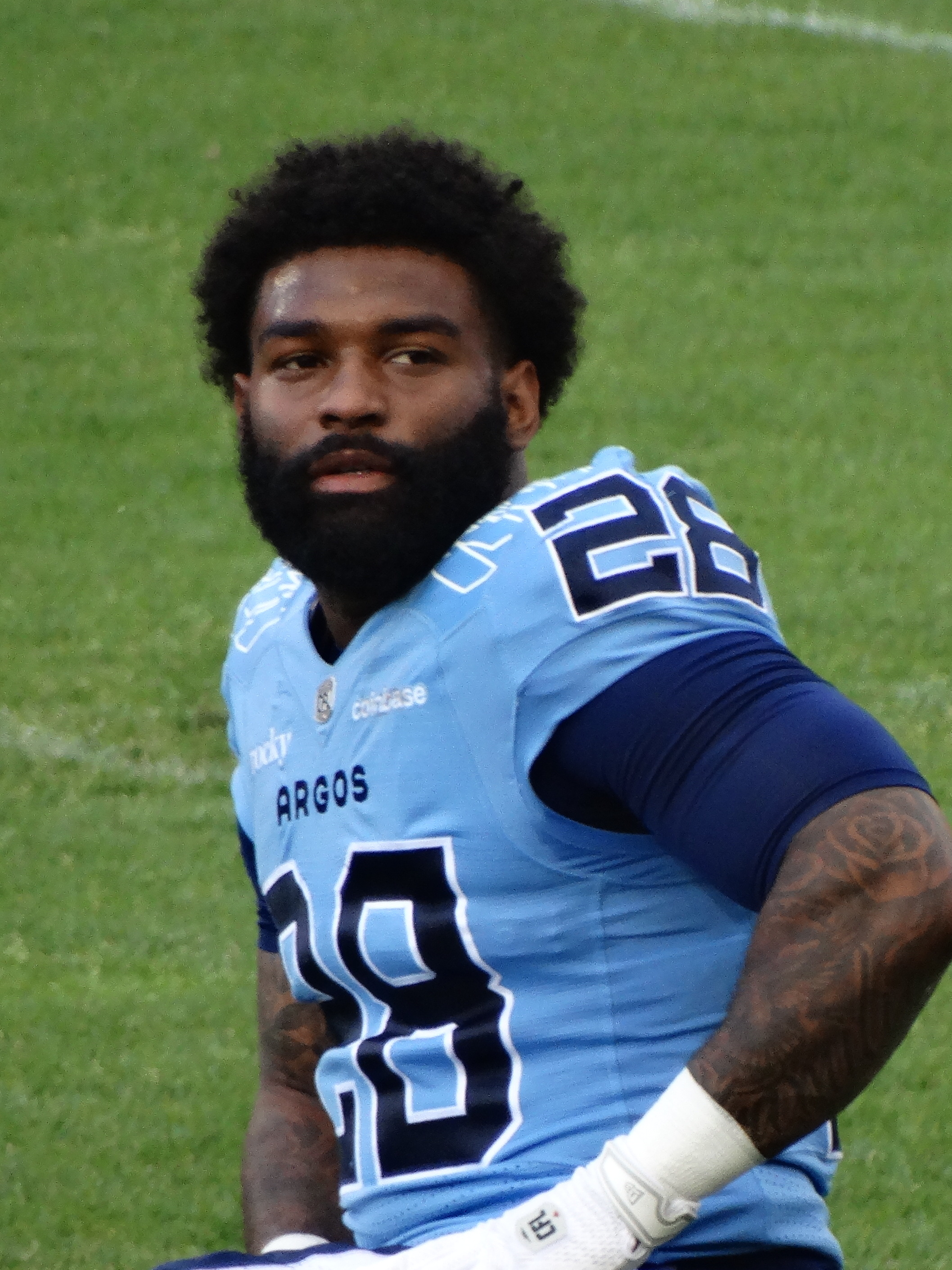
- Williams with the Toronto Argonauts in 2025

Profile
- Position: Running back

Personal information
- Born: October 29, 2001 (age 25); Cincinnati, Ohio, U.S.
- Listed height: 5 ft 9 in (1.75 m)
- Listed weight: 225 lb (102 kg)

Career information
- High school: Winton Woods (Forest Park, Ohio)
- College: Ohio State (2020–2023)

Career history
- Toronto Argonauts (2025)

Awards and highlights
- Third-team All-Big Ten (2022)
- Stats at CFL.ca

Miyan Williams (born October 29, 2001) is an American professional football running back. He most recently played for the Toronto Argonauts of the Canadian Football League (CFL). He played college football for the Ohio State Buckeyes.

== Early life ==
Williams attended Winton Woods High School in Forest Park, Ohio. During his career, he had 5,823 rushing yards and 68 touchdowns. He originally committed to Iowa State University to play college football before changing his commitment to Ohio State University.

== College career ==
As a true freshman at Ohio State in 2020, Williams played in four games and rushed 10 times for 64 yards. As a sophomore in 2021, he was a backup to TreVeyon Henderson and rushed for 508 yards on 71 carries and three touchdowns. He started 2022 in a tandem with Henderson.

=== Statistics ===
	Rushing				Receiving			
Year	Att	Yds	Avg	TD	Rec	Yds	Avg	TD
2020	10	64	6.4	0	0	0	0	0
2021	71	507	7.1	3	9	74	8.2	0
2022	64	497	7.8	8	4	26	6.5	0
2023	19	73	3.8	2	2	39	19.5	0
Total	164	1,141	7.0	13	15	139	9.3	0

== Professional career ==
Pre-draft measurables
Height	Weight	Arm length	Hand span	Wingspan	Bench press
5 ft 8 1/2 in (1.74 m)	229 lb (104 kg)	28 5/8 in (0.73 m)	9 in (0.23 m)	5 ft 9 5/8 in (1.77 m)	22 reps
All values from NFL Combine/Pro Day

On January 8, 2025, Williams signed with the Toronto Argonauts of the Canadian Football League. He played in the first four games of the season, recording 21 carries for 102 yards and 16 catches for 90 yards, but was out for the remainder of the year due to injury. He was released in the following offseason on January 16, 2026.
