= 2021 Big Ten Conference football season =

- League: NCAA Division I Football Bowl Subdivision
- Sport: Football
- Duration: August 28, 2021 through January 1, 2022
- Teams: 14
- TV partner(s): Fox Sports (Fox/FS1, Big Ten Network), ESPN (ESPN, ESPN2, ABC)

2022 NFL Draft
- Top draft pick: Aidan Hutchinson, DE, Michigan
- Picked by: Detroit Lions, 2nd overall

Regular season
- Season MVP: Aidan Hutchinson, DE, Michigan
- East Division champions: Michigan & Ohio State (co-champions)
- West Division champions: Iowa

Big Ten Championship Game
- Champions: Michigan
- Runners-up: Iowa
- Finals MVP: Aidan Hutchinson, DE, Michigan

Football seasons
- 2020 2022

2021 Big Ten Conference football standings
	Conf.			Overall
Team	W		L	W		L
East Division
No. 3 Michigan xy$^	8	–	1	12	–	2
No. 6 Ohio State x	8	–	1	11	–	2
No. 9 Michigan State	7	–	2	11	–	2
Penn State	4	–	5	7	–	6
Maryland	3	–	6	7	–	6
Rutgers	2	–	7	5	–	8
Indiana	0	–	9	2	–	10
West Division
No. 23 Iowa xy	7	–	2	10	–	4
Minnesota	6	–	3	9	–	4
Wisconsin	6	–	3	9	–	4
Purdue	6	–	3	9	–	4
Illinois	4	–	5	5	–	7
Nebraska	1	–	8	3	–	9
Northwestern	1	–	8	3	–	9
Championship: Michigan 42, Iowa 3
^ – College Football Playoff participant; $ – Conference champion; x – Division champion/co-champions; y – Championship game participant; Rankings from AP Poll

The 2021 Big Ten conference football season was the 126th season of college football play for the Big Ten Conference and part of the 2021 NCAA Division I FBS football season. This was the Big Ten's eighth season with 14 teams. The league's champion was Michigan.

With a win on November 26 over Nebraska, and a loss by Wisconsin on November 27, Iowa won the Big Ten West division. With a win over Ohio State on November 27 Michigan clinched a share of the Big Ten East division championship and a spot in the Big Ten Championship game against Iowa on December 4 at Lucas Oil Stadium.

Nine Big Ten teams were bowl-eligible at the completion of the regular season: Iowa, Maryland, Michigan (CFP), Michigan State, Minnesota, Ohio State, Penn State, Purdue, and Wisconsin. A tenth, Rutgers, was added by NCAA contingency plans on December 23 as Texas A&M withdrew from the Gator Bowl, and with no bowl eligible teams available, the NCAA chose their replacement using Academic Progress Rate regulations.

== Coaching changes ==
Illinois hired former Arkansas and Wisconsin head coach Bret Bielema to serve as head coach, replacing Lovie Smith who was fired during the 2020 season.

== Preseason ==
=== Recruiting classes ===
Rankings
Team	ESPN	Rivals	Scout & 24/7	Signees
Illinois	>40	72	73	18
Indiana	>40	66	54	14
Iowa	22	24	24	19
Maryland	18	19	18	24
Michigan	14	11	13	22
Michigan State	>40	46	45	19
Minnesota	27	41	38	18
Nebraska	39	18	20	20
Northwestern	>40	53	50	16
Ohio State	2	2	2	23
Penn State	24	26	21	17
Purdue	>40	76	76	16
Rutgers	40	40	42	21
Wisconsin	20	15	16	21

=== Big Ten Media Days ===
==== Preseason Media Poll ====
Below are the results of the preseason media poll with total points received next to each school and first-place votes in parentheses. For the 2021 poll, Ohio State was voted as the favorite to win both the East Division and the Big Ten Championship Game. This is the 11th iteration of the preseason media poll conducted by Cleveland.com, which polls at least one credentialed media member for each Big Ten team. Only three times in the last 11 years has the media accurately predicted the Big Ten champion.

East
Predicted finish	Team	Votes (1st place)
1	Ohio State	238 (34)
2	Penn State	192
3	Indiana	169
4	Michigan	144
5	Maryland	79
6	Rutgers	77.5
7	Michigan State	52.5

West
Predicted finish	Team	Votes (1st place)
1	Wisconsin	233 (29)
2	Iowa	202 (5)
3	Northwestern	160
4	Minnesota	146
5	Nebraska	91.5
6	Purdue	72.5
7	Illinois	47

Media poll (Big Ten Championship)
Rank	Team	Votes
1	Ohio State over Wisconsin	28
2	Ohio State over Iowa	5
3	Wisconsin over Ohio State	1

=== Preseason awards ===
Below are the results of the annual Preseason Big Ten Player of the Year awards conducted by Cleveland.com.

Preseason Offensive Player of the Year
Rank	Player	Position	Team	Votes (1st place)
1	Chris Olave	WR	Ohio State	58 (11)
2	Michael Penix Jr.	QB	Indiana	44.5 (8)
3	Mohamed Ibrahim	RB	Minnesota	36 (4)
4	Tyler Linderbaum	C	Iowa	13 (1)
5	Garrett Wilson	WR	Ohio State	12 (1)
6	David Bell	WR	Purdue	10 (1)
7	C. J. Stroud	QB	Ohio State	6 (2)
7	Jahan Dotson	WR	Penn State	6 (1)
7	Graham Mertz	QB	Wisconsin	6 (1)
10	Tyler Goodson	RB	Iowa	5 (1)
11	Ty Fryfogle	RB	Indiana	4 (1)
12	Tanner Morgan	QB	Minnesota	3.5 (1)

Preseason Defensive Player of the Year
Rank	Player	Position	Team	Votes (1st place)
1	Brandon Joseph	S	Northwestern	49 (11)
2	George Karlaftis	DE	Purdue	33 (8)
3	Haskell Garrett	DT	Ohio State	30.5 (5)
4	Micah McFadden	LB	Indiana	28 (6)
5	Olakunle Fatukasi	LB	Rutgers	18 (3)
6	Aidan Hutchinson	DE	Michigan	11
7	Jack Sanborn	LB	Wisconsin	7
7	Tiawan Mullen	CB	Indiana	7 (1)
9	Zach Harrison	DE	Ohio State	3.5
10	Jaquan Brisker	S	Penn State	3
10	Sevyn Banks	CB	Ohio State	3
12	Boye Mafe	DE	Minnesota	2
12	Chris Bergin	LB	Northwestern	2
12	Cam Taylor-Britt	CB	Nebraska	2
12	Jake Hansen	LB	Illinois	2
16	JoJo Domann	S/LB	Nebraska	1
16	Tyshon Fogg	LB	Rutgers	1
16	Owen Carney	LB	Illinois	1

== Rankings ==
		Pre	Wk 1	Wk 2	Wk 3	Wk 4	Wk 5	Wk 6	Wk 7	Wk 8	Wk 9	Wk 10	Wk 11	Wk 12	Wk 13	Wk 14	Final
Illinois	AP																
Illinois	C																
Illinois	CFP	Not released															
Indiana	AP	17	RV	RV													
Indiana	C	17	RV	RV		RV											
Indiana	CFP	Not released															
Iowa	AP	18	10	5	5	5	3	2	11	9	19	19	18	17	15	17	23
Iowa	C	18	12	7	6	5	3	2(1)	11	10	16	14	14	12	12	16	23
Iowa	CFP	Not released									22	20	17	16	13	15	
Maryland	AP		RV	RV	RV	RV											
Maryland	C		RV	RV	RV	RV	RV										
Maryland	CFP	Not released															
Michigan	AP	RV	RV	25	19	14	9	8	6	6	9	9	8	6	2	2	3
Michigan	C	RV	RV	25	19	14	8	7	6	6	10	8	7	6	3	2	3
Michigan	CFP	Not released									7	6	6	5	2	2	
Michigan State	AP		RV	RV	20	17	11	10	9	8	5	8	7	12	11	11	9
Michigan State	C		RV	RV	21	16t	11	9	7	7	6	9	8	13	13	10	8
Michigan State	CFP	Not released									3	7	7	12	11	10	
Minnesota	AP									RV	RV				RV	RV	RV
Minnesota	C										RV	RV			RV	RV	RV
Minnesota	CFP	Not released									20						
Nebraska	AP																
Nebraska	C																
Nebraska	CFP	Not released															
Northwestern	AP	RV															
Northwestern	C	RV															
Northwestern	CFP	Not released															
Ohio State	AP	4 (1)	3	9	10	11	7	6	5	5	6	6	5	2	7	7	6
Ohio State	C	4	3	11	12	10	7	6	5	5	5	5	4	3	7	7	5
Ohio State	CFP	Not released									5	4	4	2	7	6	
Penn State	AP	19	11	10	6	4	4	7	7	20	22	23	RV	RV	RV	RV	
Penn State	C	20	13	12	8	6	4	8	8	17	23	23	RV	RV	RV	RV	
Penn State	CFP	Not released															
Purdue	AP								25			RV	RV	RV	RV	RV	RV
Purdue	C								RV			RV	RV	RV	RV	RV	RV
Purdue	CFP	Not released										19					
Rutgers	AP					RV											
Rutgers	C		RV	RV	RV												
Rutgers	CFP	Not released															
Wisconsin	AP	12	18	18	18	RV					RV	20	19	18	RV	RV	RV
Wisconsin	C	15	17	17	15	RV					RV	24	20	18	RV	RV	RV
Wisconsin	CFP	Not released									21	18	15	14			

Legend
	Improvement in ranking
	Drop in ranking
	Not ranked previous week
	No change in ranking from previous week
RV	Received votes but were not ranked in Top 25 of poll
т	Tied with team above or below also with this symbol

== Schedule ==
Index to colors and formatting
Big Ten member won
Big Ten member lost
Big Ten teams in **bold**

All times Eastern time.

† denotes Homecoming game

=== Regular season schedule ===
==== Week 0 ====
Date	Time	Visiting team	Home team	Site	TV	Result	Attendance	Ref.
August 28	1:00 p.m.	**Nebraska**	**Illinois**	Memorial Stadium • Champaign, IL	FOX	**ILL** 30–22	41,064	
^{#}Rankings from AP Poll released prior to game. All times are in Eastern Time.

==== Week 1 ====
Date	Time	Visiting team	Home team	Site	TV	Result	Attendance	Ref.
September 2	8:00 p.m.	No. 4 **Ohio State**	**Minnesota**	Huntington Bank Stadium • Minneapolis, MN	FOX	**OSU** 45–31	50,805	
September 3	9:00 p.m.	**Michigan State**	**Northwestern**	Ryan Field • Evanston, IL	ESPN	**MSU** 38–21	34,248	
September 4	12:00 p.m.	Temple	**Rutgers**	SHI Stadium • Piscataway, NJ	BTN	**W** 61–14	52,519	
September 4	12:00 p.m.	Fordham	**Nebraska**	Memorial Stadium • Lincoln, NE	BTN	**W** 52–7	85,938	
September 4	12:00 p.m.	Western Michigan	**Michigan**	Michigan Stadium • Ann Arbor, MI	ESPN	**W** 47–14	109,295	
September 4	12:00 p.m.	No. 19 **Penn State**	No. 12 **Wisconsin**	Camp Randall Stadium • Madison, WI	FOX	**PSU** 16–10	76,832	
September 4	3:30 p.m.	No. 17 **Indiana**	No. 18 **Iowa**	Kinnick Stadium • Iowa City, IA	BTN	**IA** 34–6	68,166	
September 4	3:30 p.m.	West Virginia	**Maryland**	Maryland Stadium • College Park, MD (rivalry)	ESPN	**W** 30–24	43,811	
September 4	7:00 p.m.	Oregon State	**Purdue**	Ross-Ade Stadium • West Lafayette, IN	FS1	**W** 30–21	53,656	
September 4	7:30 p.m.	UTSA	**Illinois**	Memorial Stadium • Champaign, IL	BTN	**L** 30–37	33,906	
^{#}Rankings from AP Poll released prior to game. All times are in Eastern Time.

==== Week 2 ====
Date	Time	Visiting team	Home team	Site	TV	Result	Attendance	Ref.
September 11	11:00 a.m.	**Illinois**	Virginia	Scott Stadium • Charlottesville, VA	ACCN	**L** 14–42	36,036	
September 11	12:00 p.m.	Youngstown State	**Michigan State**	Spartan Stadium • East Lansing, MI	BTN	**W** 42–14	70,103	
September 11	12:00 p.m.	Miami (OH)	**Minnesota**	Huntington Bank Stadium • Minneapolis, MN	ESPNU	**W** 31–26	43,372	
September 11	12:00 p.m.	Indiana State	**Northwestern**	Ryan Field • Evanston, IL	BTN	**W** 24–6	26,181	
September 11	12:00 p.m.	No. 12 Oregon	No. 3 **Ohio State**	Ohio Stadium • Columbus, OH	FOX	**L** 28–35	100,482	
September 11	2:00 p.m.	**Rutgers**	Syracuse	Carrier Dome • Syracuse, NY	ACCN	**W** 17–7	31,941	
September 11	3:00 p.m.	**Purdue**	Connecticut	Rentschler Field • East Hartford, CT	CBSSN	**W** 49–0	14,817	
September 11	3:30 p.m.	Buffalo	**Nebraska**	Memorial Stadium • Lincoln, NE	BTN	**W** 28–3	85,663	
September 11	3:30 p.m.	Ball State	No. 11 **Penn State**	Beaver Stadium • University Park, PA	FS1	**W** 44–13	105,323	
September 11	4:30 p.m.	No. 10 **Iowa**	No. 9 Iowa State	Jack Trice Stadium • Ames, IA (Cy-Hawk Trophy)	ABC	**W** 27–17	61,500	
September 11	7:00 p.m.	Eastern Michigan	No. 18 **Wisconsin**	Camp Randall Stadium • Madison, WI	FS1	**W** 34–7	70,967	
September 11	7:30 p.m.	Idaho	**Indiana**	Memorial Stadium • Bloomington, IN	BTN	**W** 56–14	47,417	
September 11	7:30 p.m.	Howard	**Maryland**	Maryland Stadium • College Park, MD	BTN	**W** 62–0	31,612	
September 11	7:30 p.m.	Washington	**Michigan**	Michigan Stadium • Ann Arbor, MI	ABC	**W** 31–10	108,345	
^{#}Rankings from AP Poll released prior to game. All times are in Eastern Time.

==== Week 3 ====
Date	Time	Visiting team	Home team	Site	TV	Result	Attendance	Ref.
September 17	9:00 p.m.	**Maryland**	**Illinois**	Memorial Stadium • Champaign, IL	FS1	**MD** 20–17	37,168	
September 18	12:00 p.m.	**Nebraska**	No. 3 Oklahoma	Gaylord Family Oklahoma Memorial Stadium • Norman, OK (NU-OU Rivalry)	FOX	**L** 16–23	84,659	
September 18	12:00 p.m.	No. 8 Cincinnati	**Indiana**	Memorial Stadium • Bloomington, IN	ESPN	**L** 24–38	52,656	
September 18	12:00 p.m.	**Michigan State**	No. 24 Miami (FL)	Hard Rock Stadium • Miami Gardens, FL	ABC	**W** 38–17	46,427	
September 18	12:00 p.m.	Northern Illinois	No. 25 **Michigan**	Michigan Stadium • Ann Arbor, MI	BTN	**W** 63–10	106,263	
September 18	1:00 p.m.	**Minnesota**	Colorado	Folsom Field • Boulder, CO	P12N	**W** 30–0	47,482	
September 18	2:30 p.m.	**Purdue**	No. 12 Notre Dame	Notre Dame Stadium • South Bend, IN (Shillelagh Trophy)	NBC	**L** 13–27	74,341	
September 18	3:30 p.m.	Kent State	No. 5 **Iowa**	Kinnick Stadium • Iowa City, IA	BTN	**W** 30–7	61,932	
September 18	3:30 p.m.	Tulsa	No. 9 **Ohio State**	Ohio Stadium • Columbus, OH	FS1	**W** 41–20	76,540	
September 18	3:30 p.m.	No. 6 (FCS) Delaware	**Rutgers**	SHI Stadium • Piscataway, NJ	BTN	**W** 45–13	40,120	
September 18	4:00 p.m.	**Northwestern**	Duke	Wallace Wade Stadium • Durham, NC	ACCN	**L** 23–30	12,323	
September 18	7:30 p.m.	No. 22 Auburn	No. 10 **Penn State**	Beaver Stadium • University Park, PA	ABC	**W** 28–20	109,958	
^{#}Rankings from AP Poll released prior to game. All times are in Eastern Time.

Date	Bye Week
September 18	#18 Wisconsin

==== Week 4 ====
Date	Time	Visiting team	Home team	Site	TV	Result	Attendance	Ref.
September 25	12:00 p.m.	No. 18 **Wisconsin**	No. 12 Notre Dame	Soldier Field • Chicago, IL	FOX	**L** 13–41	59,571	
September 25†	12:00 p.m.	Bowling Green	**Minnesota**	Huntington Bank Stadium • Minneapolis, MN	ESPNU	**L** 10–14	46,236	
September 25	12:00 p.m.	Ohio	**Northwestern**	Ryan Field • Evanston, IL	BTN	**W** 35–6	27,129	
September 25	12:00 p.m.	No. 11 (FCS) Villanova	No. 6 **Penn State**	Beaver Stadium • University Park, PA	BTN	**W** 38–17	105,790	
September 25	3:30 p.m.	**Rutgers**	No. 19 **Michigan**	Michigan Stadium • Ann Arbor, MI	ABC	**MICH** 20–13	106,943	
September 25	3:30 p.m.	**Illinois**	**Purdue**	Ross-Ade Stadium • West Lafayette, IN (Purdue Cannon)	BTN	**PUR** 13–9	52,840	
September 25	3:30 p.m.	Colorado State	No. 5 **Iowa**	Kinnick Stadium • Iowa City, IA	FS1	**W** 24–14	65,456	
September 25	3:30 p.m.	Kent State	**Maryland**	Maryland Stadium • College Park, MD	BTN	**W** 37–16	30,117	
September 25	7:00 p.m.	**Nebraska**	No. 20 **Michigan State**	Spartan Stadium • East Lansing, MI	FS1	**MSU** 23–20 ^{OT}	70,332	
September 25	7:30 p.m.	Akron	No. 10 **Ohio State**	Ohio Stadium • Columbus, OH	BTN	**W** 59–7	95,178	
September 25	8:00 p.m.	**Indiana**	Western Kentucky	Houchens Industries–L. T. Smith Stadium • Bowling Green, KY	CBSSN	**W** 33–31	25,171	
^{#}Rankings from AP Poll released prior to game. All times are in Eastern Time.

==== Week 5 ====
Date	Time	Visiting team	Home team	Site	TV	Result	Attendance	Ref.
October 1	8:00 p.m.	No. 5 **Iowa**	**Maryland**	Maryland Stadium • College Park, MD	FS1	**IA** 51–14	45,527	
October 2	12:00 p.m.	No. 14 **Michigan**	**Wisconsin**	Camp Randall Stadium • Madison, WI	FOX	**MICH** 38–17	74,855	
October 2†	12:00 p.m.	**Minnesota**	**Purdue**	Ross-Ade Stadium • West Lafayette, IN	BTN	**MN** 20–13	51,111	
October 2	12:00 p.m.	Charlotte	**Illinois**	Memorial Stadium • Champaign, IL	BTN	**W** 24–14	30,559	
October 2	3:30 p.m.	No. 11 **Ohio State**	**Rutgers**	SHI Stadium • Piscataway, NJ	BTN	**OSU** 52–13	51,006	
October 2	7:30 p.m.	**Indiana**	No. 4 **Penn State**	Beaver Stadium • University Park, PA	ABC	**PSU** 24–0	105,951	
October 2†	7:30 p.m.	**Northwestern**	**Nebraska**	Memorial Stadium • Lincoln, NE	BTN	**NEB** 56–7	87,364	
October 2†	7:30 p.m.	Western Kentucky	No. 17 **Michigan State**	Spartan Stadium • East Lansing, MI	BTN	**W** 48–31	70,075	
^{#}Rankings from AP Poll released prior to game. All times are in Eastern Time.

==== Week 6 ====
Date	Time	Visiting team	Home team	Site	TV	Result	Attendance	Ref.
October 9†	12:00 p.m.	**Maryland**	No. 7 **Ohio State**	Ohio Stadium • Columbus, OH	FOX	**OSU** 66–17	99.277	
October 9†	12:00 p.m.	No. 11 **Michigan State**	**Rutgers**	SHI Stadium • Piscataway, NJ	BTN	**MSU** 31–13	41,117	
October 9†	3:30 p.m.	**Wisconsin**	**Illinois**	Memorial Stadium • Champaign, IL	BTN	**WIS** 24–0	40,168	
October 9	4:00 p.m.	No. 4 **Penn State**	No. 3 **Iowa**	Kinnick Stadium • Iowa City, IA	FOX	**IA** 23–20	69,250	
October 9	7:30 p.m.	No. 9 **Michigan**	**Nebraska**	Memorial Stadium • Lincoln, NE	ABC	**MICH** 32–29	87,380	
^{#}Rankings from AP Poll released prior to game. All times are in Eastern Time.

Date	Bye Week			
October 9	Indiana	Minnesota	Northwestern	Purdue

==== Week 7 ====
Date	Time	Visiting team	Home team	Site	TV	Result	Attendance	Ref.
October 16	12:00 p.m.	**Nebraska**	**Minnesota**	Huntington Bank Stadium • Minneapolis, MN ($5 Bits of Broken Chair Trophy)	ESPN2	**MIN** 30–23	45,436	
October 16†	12:00 p.m.	No. 10 **Michigan State**	**Indiana**	Memorial Stadium • Bloomington, IN (Old Brass Spittoon)	FS1	**MSU** 20–15	50,571	
October 16†	12:00 p.m.	**Rutgers**	**Northwestern**	Ryan Field • Evanston, IL	BTN	**NW** 21–7	30,218	
October 16†	3:30 p.m.	**Purdue**	No. 2 **Iowa**	Kinnick Stadium • Iowa City, IA	ABC	**PUR** 24–7	69,250	
October 16	8:00 p.m.	Army	**Wisconsin**	Camp Randall Stadium • Madison, WI	BTN	**W** 20–14	76,314	
^{#}Rankings from AP Poll released prior to game. All times are in Eastern Time.

Date	Bye Week				
October 16	Illinois	Maryland	#8 Michigan	#6 Ohio State	#7 Penn State

==== Week 8 ====
Date	Time	Visiting team	Home team	Site	TV	Result	Attendance	Ref.
October 23	12:00 p.m.	**Northwestern**	No. 6 **Michigan**	Michigan Stadium • Ann Arbor, MI (Jewett Trophy)	FOX	**MICH** 33–7	109,449	
October 23†	12:00 p.m.	**Illinois**	No. 7 **Penn State**	Beaver Stadium • University Park, PA	ABC	**ILL** 20–18 ^{9OT}	105,001	
October 23	3:00 p.m.	**Wisconsin**	No. 25 **Purdue**	Ross-Ade Stadium • West Lafayette, IN	BTN	**WIS** 30–13	61,320	
October 23	3:30 p.m.	**Maryland**	**Minnesota**	Huntington Bank Stadium • Minneapolis, MN	ESPN2	**MIN** 34–16	41,011	
October 23	7:30 p.m.	No. 5 **Ohio State**	**Indiana**	Memorial Stadium • Bloomington, IN	ABC	**OSU** 54–7	52,656	
^{#}Rankings from AP Poll released prior to game. All times are in Eastern Time.

Date	Bye Week			
October 23	#11 Iowa	#9 Michigan State	Nebraska	Rutgers

==== Week 9 ====
Date	Time	Visiting team	Home team	Site	TV	Result	Attendance	Ref.
October 30	12:00 p.m.	No. 6 **Michigan**	No. 8 **Michigan State**	Spartan Stadium • East Lansing, MI (Paul Bunyan Trophy)	FOX	**MSU** 37–33	76,549	
October 30†	12:00 p.m.	No. 9 **Iowa**	**Wisconsin**	Camp Randall Stadium • Madison, WI (Heartland Trophy)	ESPN	**WIS** 27–7	74,209	
October 30†	12:00 p.m.	**Indiana**	**Maryland**	Maryland Stadium • College Park, MD	BTN	**MD** 38–35	32,308	
October 30	12:00 p.m.	**Rutgers**	**Illinois**	Memorial Stadium • Champaign, IL	BTN	**RUT** 20–14	36,942	
October 30	3:30 p.m.	**Purdue**	**Nebraska**	Memorial Stadium • Lincoln, NE	ESPN2	**PUR** 28–23	85,902	
October 30	3:30 p.m.	**Minnesota**	**Northwestern**	Ryan Field • Evanston, IL	BTN	**MIN** 41–14	28,158	
October 30	7:30 p.m.	No. 20 **Penn State**	No. 5 **Ohio State**	Ohio Stadium • Columbus, OH (rivalry)	ABC	**OSU** 33–24	102,951	
^{#}Rankings from AP Poll released prior to game. All times are in Eastern Time.

==== Week 10 ====
Date	Time	Visiting team	Home team	Site	TV	Result	Attendance	Ref.
November 6	12:00 p.m.	**Illinois**	**Minnesota**	Huntington Bank Stadium • Minneapolis, MN	ESPN2	**ILL** 14–6	46,382	
November 6	12:00 p.m.	No. 6 **Ohio State**	**Nebraska**	Memorial Stadium • Lincoln, NE	FOX	**OSU** 26–17	84,426	
November 6	3:30 p.m.	**Wisconsin**	**Rutgers**	SHI Stadium • Piscataway, NJ	BTN	**WIS** 52–3	40,280	
November 6	3:30 p.m.	No. 22 **Penn State**	**Maryland**	Maryland Stadium • College Park, MD (MD-PSU Rivalry)	FS1	**PSU** 31–14	46,924	
November 6	3:30 p.m.	No. 5 **Michigan State**	**Purdue**	Ross-Ade Stadium • West Lafayette, IN	ABC	**PUR** 40–29	57,282	
November 6	7:00 p.m.	No. 19 **Iowa**	**Northwestern**	Ryan Field • Evanston, IL	BTN	**IA** 17–12	38,141	
November 6	7:30 p.m.	**Indiana**	No. 9 **Michigan**	Michigan Stadium • Ann Arbor, MI	FOX	**MICH** 29–7	109,890	
^{#}Rankings from AP Poll released prior to game. All times are in Eastern Time.

==== Week 11 ====
Date	Time	Visiting team	Home team	Site	TV	Result	Attendance	Ref.
November 13	12:00 p.m.	**Northwestern**	No. 20 **Wisconsin**	Camp Randall Stadium • Madison, WI	ESPN2	**WIS** 35–7	73,194	
November 13	12:00 p.m.	No. 9 **Michigan**	No. 23 **Penn State**	Beaver Stadium • University Park, PA	ABC	**MICH** 21–17	109,534	
November 13	12:00 p.m.	**Rutgers**	**Indiana**	Memorial Stadium • Bloomington, IN	BTN	**RUT** 38–3	40,171	
November 13	3:30 p.m.	**Minnesota**	No. 19 **Iowa**	Kinnick Stadium • Iowa City, IA (Floyd of Rosedale)	BTN	**IA** 27–22	69,250	
November 13	3:30 p.m.	**Purdue**	No. 6 **Ohio State**	Ohio Stadium • Columbus, OH	ABC	**OSU** 59–31	101,009	
November 13	4:00 p.m.	**Maryland**	No. 8 **Michigan State**	Spartan Stadium • East Lansing, MI	FOX	**MSU** 40–21	67,437	
^{#}Rankings from AP Poll released prior to game. All times are in Eastern Time.

Date	Bye Week	
November 13	Illinois	Nebraska

==== Week 12 ====
Date	Time	Visiting team	Home team	Site	TV	Result	Attendance	Ref.
November 20	12:00 p.m.	**Purdue**	**Northwestern**	Wrigley Field • Chicago, IL	BTN	**PUR** 32–14	31,500	
November 20	12:00 p.m.	No. 7 **Michigan State**	No. 5 **Ohio State**	Ohio Stadium • Columbus, OH	ABC	**OSU** 56–7	101,858	
November 20	12:00 p.m.	**Rutgers**	**Penn State**	Beaver Stadium • University Park, PA	BTN	**PSU** 28–0	106,038	
November 20	2:00 p.m.	**Illinois**	No. 18 **Iowa**	Kinnick Stadium • Iowa City, IA	FS1	**IA** 33–23	64,132	
November 20	3:30 p.m.	**Minnesota**	**Indiana**	Memorial Stadium • Bloomington, IN	BTN	**MIN** 35–14	38,079	
November 20	3:30 p.m.	No. 8 **Michigan**	**Maryland**	Maryland Stadium • College Park, MD	BTN	**MICH** 59–18	36,181	
November 20	3:30 p.m.	**Nebraska**	No. 19 **Wisconsin**	Camp Randall Stadium • Madison, WI (Freedom Trophy)	ABC	**WIS** 35–28	67,888	
^{#}Rankings from AP Poll released prior to game. All times are in Eastern Time.

==== Week 13 ====
Date	Time	Visiting team	Home team	Site	TV	Result	Attendance	Ref.
November 26	1:30 p.m.	No. 17 **Iowa**	**Nebraska**	Memorial Stadium • Lincoln, NE (Heroes Trophy)	BTN	**IA** 28–21	86,541	
November 27	12:00 p.m.	No. 2 **Ohio State**	No. 6 **Michigan**	Michigan Stadium • Ann Arbor, MI (The Game)	FOX	**MICH** 42–27	111,156	
November 27	12:00 p.m.	**Maryland**	**Rutgers**	SHI Stadium • Piscataway, NJ	BTN	**MD** 40–16	42,729	
November 27	3:30 p.m.	**Northwestern**	**Illinois**	Memorial Stadium • Champaign, IL (Land of Lincoln Trophy)	BTN	**ILL** 47–14	27,624	
November 27	3:30 p.m.	**Indiana**	**Purdue**	Ross-Ade Stadium • West Lafayette, IN (Old Oaken Bucket)	FS1	**PUR** 44–7	61,320	
November 27	3:30 p.m.	**Penn State**	No. 12 **Michigan State**	Spartan Stadium • East Lansing, MI (Land Grant Trophy)	ABC	**MSU** 30–27	0	
November 27	4:00 p.m.	No. 18 **Wisconsin**	**Minnesota**	Huntington Bank Stadium • Minneapolis, MN (Paul Bunyan's Axe)	FOX	**MIN** 23–13	49,736	
^{#}Rankings from AP Poll released prior to game. All times are in Eastern Time.

==== Big Ten Championship Game ====
Date	Time	Visiting team	Home team	Site	TV	Result	Attendance	Ref.
December 4	8:00 p.m.	No. 2 **Michigan**	No. 15 **Iowa**	Lucas Oil Stadium • Indianapolis, IN	FOX	**MICH** 42–3	67,183	
^{#}Rankings from AP Poll released prior to game. All times are in Eastern Time.

== Postseason ==
=== Bowl games ===
For the 2020–2025 bowl cycle, The Big Ten will have annually eight appearances in the following bowls: Rose Bowl (unless they are selected for playoffs filled by a Pac-12 team if champion is in the playoffs), Citrus Bowl, Guaranteed Rate Bowl, Las Vegas Bowl, Music City Bowl, Pinstripe Bowl, Quick Lane Bowl, and Outback Bowl. The Big Ten teams will go to a New Year's Six bowl if a team finishes higher than the champions of Power Five conferences in the final College Football Playoff rankings. The Big Ten champion is also eligible for the College Football Playoff if it's among the top four teams in the final CFP ranking.

On December 22, Texas A&M withdrew from the Gator Bowl, citing a breakout of positive COVID-19 cases and season-ending injuries limiting them to few players. On December 23, the NCAA football oversight committee approved Rutgers as the first bowl alternate, under rules where five-win teams are calculated by Academic Progress Rate calculations. Rutgers finished first in APR among the five-win schools and was given the offer to accept the bid. The NCAA also allowed the game to be postponed as late as January 10 in order to allow any replacement teams time.

Legend
Big Ten win
Big Ten loss

Bowl game	Date	Site	Television	Time (EST)	Big Ten team	Opponent	Score	Attendance	Ref.
Guaranteed Rate Bowl	December 28, 2021	Chase Field • Phoenix, AZ	ESPN	10:15 p.m.	Minnesota	West Virginia	W 18–6	21,220	
Pinstripe Bowl	December 29, 2021	Yankee Stadium • New York, NY	ESPN	2:15 p.m.	Maryland	Virginia Tech	W 54–10	29,653	
Music City Bowl	December 30, 2021	Nissan Stadium • Nashville, TN	ESPN	3:00 p.m.	Purdue	Tennessee	W 48–45 ^{OT}	69,489	
Las Vegas Bowl	December 30, 2021	Allegiant Stadium • Las Vegas, NV	ESPN	10:30 p.m.	Wisconsin	Arizona State	W 20–13	32,515	
Gator Bowl	December 31, 2021	TIAA Bank Field • Jacksonville, FL	ESPN	11:00 a.m.	Rutgers	#20 Wake Forest	L 10–38	28,508	
Outback Bowl	January 1, 2022	Raymond James Stadium • Tampa, FL	ESPN2	12:30 p.m.	Penn State	#22 Arkansas	L 10–24	46,577	
Citrus Bowl	January 1, 2022	Camping World Stadium • Orlando, FL	ABC	1:00 p.m.	#17 Iowa	#25 Kentucky	L 17–20	50,769	
New Year's Six Bowls
Peach Bowl	December 30, 2021	Mercedes-Benz Stadium • Atlanta, GA	ESPN	7:00 p.m.	#11 Michigan State	#13 Pittsburgh	W 31–21	41,230	
Rose Bowl	January 1, 2022	Rose Bowl • Pasadena, CA	ESPN	5:00 p.m.	#7 Ohio State	#10 Utah	W 48–45	87,842	
College Football Playoff
Orange Bowl (semifinal)	December 31, 2021	Hard Rock Stadium • Miami Gardens, FL	ESPN	7:30 p.m.	#2 Michigan	#3 Georgia	L 11–34	66,839	

Rankings are from AP Poll. All times Eastern Time Zone.

== Big Ten records vs other conferences ==
2021–2022 records against non-conference foes:

Power Conferences 5	Record
ACC	2–2
Big 12	2–1
BYU/Notre Dame	0–2
Pac-12	3–1
SEC	1–0
Power 5 Total	8–6
Other FBS Conferences	Record
American	2–1
C–USA	4–1
Independents (Excluding Notre Dame)	1–0
MAC	10–1
Mountain West	1–0
Sun Belt	0–0
Other FBS Total	18–3
FCS Opponents	Record
Football Championship Subdivision	7–0
Total Non-Conference Record	33–9

Post Season

Power Conferences 5	Record
ACC	2–1
Big 12	1–0
BYU/Notre Dame	0–0
Pac-12	2–0
SEC	1–3
Power 5 Total	6–4
Other FBS Conferences	Record
American	0–0
C–USA	0–0
Independents (Excluding Notre Dame)	0–0
MAC	0–0
Mountain West	0–0
Sun Belt	0–0
Other FBS Total	0–0
Total Bowl Record	6–4

== Awards and honors ==
=== Player of the week honors ===
Week	Offensive			Defensive			Special Teams			Freshman		
Week	Player	Position	Team	Player	Position	Team	Player	Position	Team	Player	Position	Team
Week 0 (Aug. 30)	Artur Sitkowski	QB	ILL	Calvin Hart Jr.	LB	ILL	Blake Hayes	P	ILL	Deuce Spann	WR	ILL
Week 1 (Sept. 6)	Kenneth Walker III	RB	MSU	Riley Moss	DB	IA	Jordan Stout	K/P	PSU	C. J. Stroud	QB	OSU
Week 2 (Sept. 13)	Blake Corum	RB	MICH	Luke Reimer	LB	NEB	Adam Korsak	P	RUT	C. J. Stroud	QB	OSU
Week 2 (Sept. 13)	Blake Corum	RB	MICH	Luke Reimer	LB	NEB	Tory Taylor	P	IA	C. J. Stroud	QB	OSU
Week 3 (Sept. 20)	Payton Thorne	QB	MSU	Brandon Smith	LB	PSU	Aron Cruickshank	WR	RUT	TreVeyon Henderson	RB	OSU
Week 3 (Sept. 20)	TreVeyon Henderson	RB	OSU	Brandon Smith	LB	PSU	Joseph Petrino	K	MD	TreVeyon Henderson	RB	OSU
Week 4 (Sept. 27)	Sean Clifford	QB	PSU	Jack Campbell	LB	IA	Jayden Reed	WR	MSU	Kyle McCord	QB	OSU
Week 4 (Sept. 27)	Evan Hull	RB	NW	Jack Campbell	LB	IA	Jayden Reed	WR	MSU	Kyle McCord	QB	OSU
Week 5 (Oct. 4)	Chase Brown	RB	ILL	David Ojabo	LB	MICH	Mark Crawford	P	MIN	C. J. Stroud	QB	OSU
Week 5 (Oct. 4)	Chase Brown	RB	ILL	JoJo Domann	LB	NEB	Jordan Stout	P/K	PSU	C. J. Stroud	QB	OSU
Week 6 (Oct. 11)	Jalen Nailor	WR	MSU	Matt Hankins	DB	IA	Jake Moody	K	MICH	C. J. Stroud	QB	OSU
Week 6 (Oct. 11)	C. J. Stroud	QB	OSU	Brad Hawkins	DB	MICH	Jake Moody	K	MICH	C. J. Stroud	QB	OSU
Week 7 (Oct. 18)	David Bell	WR	PUR	Cam Allen	S	PUR	Matt Coghlin	K	MSU	Braelon Allen	RB	WIS
Week 8 (Oct. 25)	Chase Brown	RB	ILL	Leo Chenal	LB	WIS	Collin Larsh	K	WIS	C. J. Stroud	QB	OSU\
Week 9 (Nov. 1)	Kenneth Walker III	RB	MSU	Jalen Graham	LB/S	PUR	Noah Ruggles	K	OSU	Andrel Anthony	WR	MICH
Week 9 (Nov. 1)	Kenneth Walker III	RB	MSU	Jalen Graham	LB/S	PUR	Adam Korsak	P	RUT	Mar'Keise Irving	RB	MIN
Week 10 (Nov. 8)	Jahan Dotson	WR	PSU	Ji'Ayir Brown	S	PSU	Blake Hayes	P	ILL	Braelon Allen	RB	WIS
Week 10 (Nov. 8)	Aidan O'Connell	QB	PUR	Ji'Ayir Brown	S	PSU	Blake Hayes	P	ILL	Braelon Allen	RB	WIS
Week 11 (Nov. 15)	Garrett Wilson	WR	OSU	Aidan Hutchinson	DE	MICH	Jordan Stout	P/K	PSU	C. J. Stroud	QB	OSU
Week 11 (Nov. 15)	Braelon Allen	RB	WIS	Aidan Hutchinson	DE	MICH	Jordan Stout	P/K	PSU	C. J. Stroud	QB	OSU
Week 12 (Nov. 22)	C. J. Stroud	QB	OSU	Isaiah Gay	LB	ILL	Jordan Stout	K/P	PSU	C. J. Stroud	QB	OSU
Week 13 (Nov. 29)	Hassan Haskins	RB	MICH	Aidan Hutchinson	DE	MICH	Caleb Shudak	K	IA	Justin Walley	CB	MIN

=== Big Ten individual awards ===
The following individuals won the conference's annual player and coach awards:

Award	Player	School
Most Valuable Player	Aidan Hutchinson	Michigan
Graham–George Offensive Player of the Year	C. J. Stroud	Ohio State
Griese–Brees Quarterback of the Year	C. J. Stroud	Ohio State
Richter–Howard Receiver of the Year	David Bell	Purdue
Ameche–Dayne Running Back of the Year	Kenneth Walker III	Michigan State
Kwalick–Clark Tight End of the Year	Austin Allen	Nebraska
Rimington–Pace Offensive Lineman of the Year	Tyler Linderbaum	Iowa
Nagurski–Woodson Defensive Player of the Year	Aidan Hutchinson	Michigan
Smith–Brown Defensive Lineman of the Year	Aidan Hutchinson	Michigan
Butkus–Fitzgerald Linebacker of the Year	Leo Chenal	Wisconsin
Tatum–Woodson Defensive Back of the Year	Riley Moss	Iowa
Thompson–Randle El Freshman of the Year	C. J. Stroud	Ohio State
Bakken–Andersen Kicker of the Year	Jake Moody	Michigan
Eddleman–Fields Punter of the Year	Jordan Stout	Penn State
Rodgers–Dwight Return Specialist of the Year	Charlie Jones	Iowa
Hayes–Schembechler Coach of the Year	Mel Tucker	Michigan State
Dave McClain Coach of the Year	Mel Tucker	Michigan State
Dungy–Thompson Humanitarian Award	Malcolm Jenkins	Ohio State
Ford–Kinnick Leadership Award	Pat Richter	Wisconsin

=== Individual awards ===
Award	Head coach/Player	School	Position	Link
Lott Trophy	Aidan Hutchinson	Michigan	DE	
Doak Walker Award	Kenneth Walker III	Michigan State	RB	
Rimington Trophy	Tyler Linderbaum	Iowa	C	
Lou Groza Award	Jake Moody	Michigan	PK	
Walter Camp Award	Kenneth Walker III	Michigan State	RB	

=== All-Conference Teams ===
2021 Big Ten All-Conference Teams and Awards

Position	Player	Team
First Team Offense (Coaches)
QB	C. J. Stroud	Ohio State
RB	Hassan Haskins	Michigan
RB	Kenneth Walker III	Michigan State
WR	Chris Olave	Ohio State
WR	David Bell	Purdue
TE	Jake Ferguson	Wisconsin
C	Tyler Linderbaum	Iowa
OG	Thayer Munford	Ohio State
OG	Josh Seltzner	Wisconsin
OT	Daniel Faalele	Minnesota
OT	Nicholas Petit-Frere	Ohio State
First Team Defense (Coaches)
DL	Aidan Hutchinson	Michigan
DL	Haskell Garrett	Ohio State
DL	Arnold Ebiketie	Penn State
DL	George Karlaftis	Purdue
LB	David Ojabo	Michigan
LB	Leo Chenal	Wisconsin
LB	Jack Sanborn	Wisconsin
DB	Dane Belton	Iowa
DB	Riley Moss	Iowa
DB	Daxton Hill	Michigan
DB	Jaquan Brisker	Penn State
First Team Special Teams (Coaches)
PK	Jake Moody	Michigan
P	Jordan Stout	Penn State
P	Adam Korsak	Rutgers
RS	Charlie Jones	Iowa

Position	Player	Team
Second Team Offense (Coaches)
QB	Aidan O'Connell	Purdue
RB	TreVeyon Henderson	Ohio State
RB	Braelon Allen	Wisconsin
WR	Garrett Wilson	Ohio State
WR	Jahan Dotson	Penn State
TE	Austin Allen	Nebraska
C	Doug Kramer	Illinois
C	John Michael Schmitz	Minnesota
OG	Kyler Schott	Iowa
OG	Paris Johnson Jr.	Ohio State
OT	Ryan Hayes	Michigan
OT	Peter Skoronski	Northwestern
OT	Logan Bruss	Wisconsin
Second Team Defense (Coaches)
DL	Zach VanValkenburg	Iowa
DL	Jacub Panasiuk	Michigan State
DL	Tyreke Smith	Ohio State
DL	P. J. Mustipher	Penn State
DL	Keeanu Benton	Wisconsin
LB	Micah McFadden	Indiana
LB	JoJo Domann	Nebraska
LB	Ellis Brooks	Penn State
DB	Kerby Joseph	Illinois
DB	Matt Hankins	Iowa
DB	Cam Taylor-Britt	Nebraska
DB	Ronnie Hickman	Ohio State
Second Team Special Teams (Coaches)
PK	Caleb Shudak	Iowa
P	–	-
RS	Jayden Reed	Michigan State

Position	Player	Team
Third Team Offense (Coaches)
QB	Cade McNamara	Michigan
RB	Chase Brown	Illinois
RB	Blake Corum	Michigan
WR	Jayden Reed	Michigan State
WR	Jaxon Smith-Njigba	Ohio State
TE	Sam LaPorta	Iowa
C	Cam Jurgens	Nebraska
OG	Blaise Andries	Minnesota
OG	Conner Olson	Minnesota
OT	Andrew Stueber	Michigan
OT	Dawand Jones	Ohio State
OT	Tyler Beach	Wisconsin
Third Team Defense (Coaches)
DL	Sam Okuayinonu	Maryland
DL	Boye Mafe	Minnesota
DL	Zach Harrison	Ohio State
DL	Matt Henningsen	Wisconsin
LB	Jack Campbell	Iowa
LB	Chris Bergin	Northwestern
LB	Brandon Smith	Penn State
DB	Denzel Burke	Ohio State
DB	Ji'Ayir Brown	Penn State
DB	Joey Porter Jr.	Penn State
DB	Caesar Williams	Wisconsin
Third Team Special Teams (Coaches)
PK	James McCourt	Illinois
P	Blake Hayes	Illinois
RS	Jahan Dotson	Penn State

Coaches Honorable Mention: ILLINOIS: Sydney Brown, Owen Carney, Vederian Lowe, Alex Palczewski; INDIANA: Matthew Bedford, Peyton Hendershot; IOWA: Tyler Goodson, Jack Koerner, Mason Richman, Noah Shannon, Tory Taylor; MARYLAND: Jakorian Bennett, Dontay Demus, Jaelyn Duncan, Ami Finau, Rakim Jarrett, Chig Okonkwo, Taulia Tagovailoa; MICHIGAN: Erick All, Christopher Hinton Jr., Trevor Keegan, Josh Ross, Brad Robbins, Luke Schoonmaker, Mazi Smith, D. J. Turner, Andrew Vastardis; MICHIGAN STATE: Matt Allen, Quavaris Crouch, Xavier Henderson, Connor Heyward, Jarrett Horst, Kevin Jarvis, Jacob Slade, Payton Thorne; MINNESOTA: Ko Kieft, Esezi Otomewo, Sam Schlueter, Mariano Sori-Marin; NEBRASKA: Damion Daniels, Marquel Dismuke, Adrian Martinez, Luke Reimer, Ben Stille, Deontai Williams; NORTHWESTERN: Adetomiwa Adebawore, A. J. Hampton, Evan Hull, Brandon Joseph, Cameron Mitchell; OHIO STATE: Sevyn Banks, Cameron Brown, Emeka Egbuka, Antwuan Jackson, Jeremy Ruckert; PENN STATE: Tariq Castro-Fields, Sean Clifford, Jesse Luketa, Juice Scruggs, Rasheed Walker; PURDUE: Jaylan Alexander, Cam Allen, Branson Deen, Payne Durham, Mitchell Fineran, Jalen Graham, Greg Long, Dedrick Mackey, Tyler Witt, Milton Wright; RUTGERS: Olakunle Fatukasi, Isiah Pacheco, Julius Turner; WISCONSIN: Noah Burks, Nick Herbig, Faion Hicks, Isiah Mullens, Jack Nelson, Scott Nelson, Joe Tippmann, Collin Wilder.

Position	Player	Team
First Team Offense (Media)
QB	C. J. Stroud	Ohio State
RB	Hassan Haskins	Michigan
RB	Kenneth Walker III	Michigan State
WR	Jahan Dotson	Penn State
WR	David Bell	Purdue
TE	Austin Allen	Nebraska
C	Tyler Linderbaum	Iowa
OG	Blaise Andries	Minnesota
OG	Thayer Munford	Ohio State
OT	Andrew Stueber	Michigan
OT	Peter Skoronski	Northwestern
OT	Nicholas Petit-Frere	Ohio State
First Team Defense (Media)
DL	Aidan Hutchinson	Michigan
DL	Haskell Garrett	Ohio State
DL	Arnold Ebiketie	Penn State
DL	George Karlaftis	Purdue
LB	David Ojabo	Michigan
LB	Leo Chenal	Wisconsin
LB	Jack Campbell	Iowa
DB	Dane Belton	Iowa
DB	Riley Moss	Iowa
DB	Kerby Joseph	Illinois
DB	Jaquan Brisker	Penn State
First Team Special Teams (Media)
PK	Caleb Shudak	Iowa
P	Jordan Stout	Penn State
RS	Charlie Jones	Iowa

Position	Player	Team
Second Team Offense (Media)
QB	Aidan O'Connell	Purdue
RB	TreVeyon Henderson	Ohio State
RB	Braelon Allen	Wisconsin
WR	Chris Olave	Ohio State
WR	Garrett Wilson	Ohio State
TE	Jake Ferguson	Wisconsin
C	Andrew Vastardis	Michigan
OG	Zak Zinter	Michigan
OG	Josh Seltzner	Wisconsin
OT	Dawand Jones	Ohio State
OT	Logan Bruss	Wisconsin
Second Team Defense (Media)
DL	Zach VanValkenburg	Iowa
DL	Jacub Panasiuk	Michigan State
DL	Boye Mafe	Minnesota
DL	Zach Harrison	Ohio State
LB	Micah McFadden	Indiana
LB	Chris Bergin	Northwestern
LB	Jack Sanborn	Wisconsin
DB	Daxton Hill	Michigan
DB	Matt Hankins	Iowa
DB	Cam Taylor-Britt	Nebraska
DB	Brandon Joseph	Northwestern
Second Team Special Teams (Media)
PK	Noah Ruggles	Ohio State
P	Bryce Baringer	Michigan State
RS	Jayden Reed	Michigan State

Position	Player	Team
Third Team Offense (Media)
QB	Cade McNamara	Michigan
RB	Chase Brown	Illinois
RB	Tyler Goodson	Iowa
WR	Jayden Reed	Michigan State
WR	Jaxon Smith-Njigba	Ohio State
TE	Peyton Hendershot	Indiana
C	John Michael Schmitz	Minnesota
OG	Kyler Schott	Iowa
OG	Paris Johnson Jr.	Ohio State
OT	Daniel Faalele	Minnesota
OT	Rasheed Walker	Penn State
Third Team Defense (Media)
DL	Jacob Slade	Michigan State
DL	Tyreke Smith	Ohio State
DL	Jesse Luketa	Penn State
DL	Matt Henningsen	Wisconsin
LB	Olakunle Fatukasi	Rutgers
LB	Josh Ross	Michigan
LB	JoJo Domann	Nebraska
DB	Vincent Gray	Michigan
DB	Brad Hawkins	Michigan
DB	Xavier Henderson	Michigan State
DB	Ronnie Hickman	Ohio State
Third Team Special Teams (Media)
PK	Jake Moody	Michigan
P	Adam Korsak	Rutgers
RS	A. J. Henning	Michigan

Media Honorable Mention: ILLINOIS: Sydney Brown, Owen Carney, Blake Hayes, Doug Kramer, Vederian Lowe, James McCourt, Johnny Newton, Alex Palczewski, Keith Randolph, Devon Witherspoon; INDIANA: Ryder Anderson, Matthew Bedford, Ty Fryfogle, Jaylin Williams; IOWA: Seth Benson, Jack Koerner, Sam LaPorta, Mason Richman, Noah Shannon, Tory Taylor; MARYLAND: Spencer Anderson, Jakorian Bennett, Nick Cross, Ami Finau, Rakim Jarrett, Jordan Mosley, Chig Okonkwo, Sam Okuayinonu, Taulia Tagovailoa; MICHIGAN: Erick All, Blake Corum, Ryan Hayes, Christopher Hinton Jr., Trevor Keegan, Brad Robbins, Luke Schoonmaker, Mazi Smith, D. J. Turner; MICHIGAN STATE: Matt Allen, A. J. Arcuri, Blake Bueter, Matt Coghlin, Quavaris Crouch, J. D. Duplain, Cal Haladay, Connor Heyward, Jarrett Horst, Kevin Jarvis, Jalen Nailor, Darius Snow, Payton Thorne; MINNESOTA: Chris Autman-Bell, Jack Gibbens, Ko Kieft, Tyler Nubin, Conner Olson, Esezi Otomewo, Sam Schlueter, Mariano Sori-Marin; NEBRASKA: Damion Daniels, Cam Jurgens, Luke Reimer, Ben Stille, Samori Toure, Deontai Williams; NORTHWESTERN: Adetomiwa Adebawore, A. J. Hampton, Evan Hull; OHIO STATE: Sevyn Banks, Cameron Brown, Denzel Burke, Steele Chambers, Emeka Egbuka, Tommy Eichenberg, Antwuan Jackson, Matthew Jones, Jeremy Ruckert, Bryson Shaw, Taron Vincent, Tyleik Williams, Luke Wypler; PENN STATE: Ellis Brooks, Ji'Ayir Brown, Tariq Castro-Fields, Sean Clifford, Jahan Dotson, Curtis Jacobs, Mike Miranda, P. J. Mustipher, Joey Porter Jr., Juice Scruggs, Brandon Smith, Jordan Stout, Brenton Strange; PURDUE: Jaylan Alexander, Cam Allen, Branson Deen, Mitchell Fineran, Jalen Graham, Gus Hartwig, Tyler Witt, Milton Wright; RUTGERS: Christian Izien, Isiah Pacheco, Julius Turner; WISCONSIN: Tyler Beach, Keeanu Benton, Noah Burks, Nick Herbig, Faion Hicks, Chez Mellusi, Isiah Mullens, Jack Nelson, Scott Nelson, Joe Tippmann, Collin Wilder, Caesar Williams.

== Home attendance ==
Team	Stadium	Capacity	Game 1	Game 2	Game 3	Game 4	Game 5	Game 6	Game 7	Game 8	Total	Average	% of Capacity
Illinois	Memorial Stadium	60,670	41,064	33,906	37,168	30,559	40,168	36,942	27,624		247,431	35,347	58.3%
Indiana	Memorial Stadium	52,656	47,417	52,656	50,571	52,656	40,171	38,079			281,550	46,925	89.1%
Iowa	Kinnick Stadium	69,250	68,166	61,932	65,456	69,250	69,250	69,250	64,132		467,436	66,777	96.4%
Maryland	Maryland Stadium	51,802	43,811	31,612	30,117	45,527	32,308	46,924	36,181		266,480	33,310	61.7%
Michigan	Michigan Stadium	107,601	109,295	108,345	106,263	105,790	109,449	109,890	111,156		760,188	108,598	100.9%
Michigan State	Spartan Stadium	75,005	70,103	70,332	70,075	76,549	67,437				354,496	70,899	94.5%
Minnesota	Huntington Bank Stadium	50,805	50,805	43,372	46,236	45,436	46,382	49,736			281,967	46,995	92.5%
Nebraska	Memorial Stadium	85,458	85,938	85,663	87,364	87,380	85,902	84,426	86,541		603,214	86,173	100.8%
Northwestern	Ryan Field	47,130	34,248	26,181	27,129	30,218	28,158	38,141			184,075	30,679	65.1%
Ohio State	Ohio Stadium	102,780	100,482	76,540	95,178	99,277	102,951	101,009	101,858		677,295	96,756	94.1%
Penn State	Beaver Stadium	106,572	105,323	109,958	105,790	105,951	105,001	109,534	106,038		751,595	107,371	100.7%
Purdue	Ross–Ade Stadium	57,236	53,656	52,840	51,111	61,320	57,282	61,320			337,529	56,255	98.3%
Rutgers	SHI Stadium	52,454	52,519	40,120	51,006	41,117	40,280	42,729			267,771	44,629	85.1%
Wisconsin	Camp Randall Stadium	80,321	76,832	70,967	74,855	76,314	74,209	73,194	67,888		514,259	73,466	91.5%

== 2022 NFL draft ==
Team	Round 1	Round 2	Round 3	Round 4	Round 5	Round 6	Round 7	Total
Illinois	–	–	1	–	–	2	–	3
Indiana	–	–	–	–	1	–	–	1
Iowa	1	–	–	1	–	–	–	2
Maryland	–	–	1	1	–	–	–	2
Michigan	2	1	–	1	–	–	1	5
Michigan State	–	1	–	–	–	2	1	4
Minnesota	–	1	–	1	1	1	–	4
Nebraska	–	2	–	–	–	–	1	3
Northwestern	–	–	–	–	–	–	–	–
Ohio State	2	–	2	–	1	–	1	6
Penn State	1	2	–	2	–	1	2	8
Purdue	1	–	1	–	–	–	1	3
Rutgers	–	–	–	–	–	–	2	2
Wisconsin	–	–	2	1	–	1	1	5

*	compensatory selection
×	2020 Resolution JC-2A selection

Rnd.	Pick	Team	Player	Pos.	College	Notes
1	2	Detroit Lions	Aidan Hutchinson	DE	Michigan	2021 Lombardi Award, Lott Trophy, and Ted Hendricks Award winner
1	10	New York Jets	Garrett Wilson	WR	Ohio State	from Seattle (Note: No. 10: Seattle → N.Y. Jets (PD). Seattle traded safety Bradley McDougald, a first-round selection, and 2021 first and third-round selections to the New York Jets in exchange for safety Jamal Adams and a fourth-round selection.)
1	11	New Orleans Saints	Chris Olave	WR	Ohio State	from Washington (Note: No. 11: Washington → New Orleans (D). Washington traded its first-round selection (11th overall) to New Orleans in exchange for a first-, third-, and fourth-round selections (16th, 98th, and 120th overall).)
1	16	Washington Commanders	Jahan Dotson	WR	Penn State	from Indianapolis via Philadelphia and New Orleans (Note: No. 16: Indianapolis → Philadelphia → New Orleans → Washington. Multiple trades: Indianapolis → Philadelphia (PD). Indianapolis traded a conditional second-round selection and a 2021 third-round selection to Philadelphia in exchange for quarterback Carson Wentz. The conditional selection became a first-round selection because Wentz played 75% of Indianapolis' offensive snaps. Philadelphia → New Orleans (PD). Philadelphia traded two first-round selections (16th and 19th overall) and a sixth-round selection (194th overall) to New Orleans in exchange for first, third, and seventh-round selections (18th, 101st, and 237th overall) as well as a 2023 first-round selection and a 2024 second-round selection. New Orleans → Washington (D). See No. 11: Washington → New Orleans.)
1	25	Baltimore Ravens	Tyler Linderbaum	C	Iowa	from Buffalo (Note: No. 25: Buffalo → Baltimore (D). See No. 23: Baltimore → Buffalo.); 2021 Rimington Trophy winner
1	30	Kansas City Chiefs	George Karlaftis	DE	Purdue	
1	31	Cincinnati Bengals	Daxton Hill	S	Michigan	
2	38	Atlanta Falcons	Arnold Ebiketie	OLB	Penn State	from Carolina via New York Jets and New York Giants (Note: No. 38: Carolina → N.Y. Jets → N.Y. Giants → Atlanta. Multiple trades: Carolina → N.Y. Jets (PD). Carolina traded second and fourth-round selections, and a 2021 sixth-round selection to the New York Jets in exchange for quarterback Sam Darnold. N.Y. Jets → N.Y. Giants (D). See No. 36: N.Y. Giants → N.Y. Jets. N.Y. Giants → Atlanta (D). The Giants traded their second-round selection (38th overall) to Atlanta in exchange for second- and fourth-round selections (43rd and 114th overall).)
2	40	Seattle Seahawks	Boye Mafe	DE	Minnesota	from Denver (Note: No. 40: Denver → Seattle (PD). See No. 9: Denver → Seattle.)
2	41	Seattle Seahawks	Kenneth Walker III	RB	Michigan State	2021 Walter Camp Award and Doak Walker Award winner
2	45	Baltimore Ravens	David Ojabo	OLB	Michigan	
2	48	Chicago Bears	Jaquan Brisker	S	Penn State	from L.A. Chargers (Note: No. 48: L.A. Chargers → Chicago (PD). The Los Angeles Chargers traded a second-round selection as well as a 2023 sixth-round selection to Chicago in exchange for outside linebacker Khalil Mack.)
2	51	Philadelphia Eagles	Cam Jurgens	C	Nebraska	
2	60	Cincinnati Bengals	Cam Taylor-Britt	CB	Nebraska	from Tampa Bay via Buffalo (Note: No. 60: Tampa Bay → Buffalo → Cincinnati. Multiple trades: Tampa Bay → Buffalo (D). See No. 57: Buffalo → Tampa Bay. Buffalo → Cincinnati (D). Buffalo traded a second-round selection (60th overall) to Cincinnati for a second- and sixth-round selection (63rd and 209th overall).)
3	69	Tennessee Titans	Nicholas Petit-Frere	T	Ohio State	from N.Y. Jets (Note: No. 69: N.Y. Jets → Tennessee (D). See No. 26: Tennessee → N.Y. Jets.)
3	96	Indianapolis Colts	Nick Cross	S	Maryland	from L.A. Rams via Denver (Note: No. 96: L.A. Rams → Denver → Indianapolis (D). Multiple trades: No. 96: L.A. Rams → Denver (PD). See No. 32: L.A. Rams → Denver. No. 96: Denver → Indianapolis (D). Denver traded its third-round selection (96th overall) to Indianapolis in exchange for a fifth-round selection (179th overall) and a 2023 third-round selection.)
3*	97	Detroit Lions	Kerby Joseph	S	Illinois	
3×	99	Cleveland Browns	David Bell	WR	Purdue	2020 Resolution JC-2A selection (Note: Cleveland received a third-round selection and a 2023 third-round selection when Minnesota hired Browns' vice president of football operations Kwesi Adofo-Mensah as general manager.)
3×	101	New York Jets	Jeremy Ruckert	TE	Ohio State	2020 Resolution JC-2A selection (Note: New Orleans received a third-round selection along with a 2021 third-round selection when Atlanta hired Saints pro scouting director Terry Fontenot as general manager.) from New Orleans via Philadelphia and Tennessee (Note: No. 101: New Orleans → Philadelphia → Tennessee → N.Y. Jets. Multiple trades: New Orleans → Philadelphia (PD). See No. 16: Philadelphia → New Orleans. Philadelphia → Tennessee (D). See No. 18: Philadelphia → Tennessee. Tennessee → N.Y Jets (D). See No. 26: Tennessee → N.Y. Jets.)
3×	103	Kansas City Chiefs	Leo Chenal	LB	Wisconsin	2020 Resolution JC-2A selection (Note: Kansas City received a third-round selection and a 2023 third-round selection when Chicago hired Chiefs executive director of player personnel Ryan Poles as general manager.)
3×	104	Los Angeles Rams	Logan Bruss	G	Wisconsin	2020 Resolution JC-2A selection (Note: The Los Angeles Rams received a third-round selection along with a 2021 third-round selection when Detroit hired their college scouting director Brad Holmes as general manager.)
4	110	Baltimore Ravens	Daniel Faalele	T	Minnesota	from N.Y. Giants (Note: No. 110: N.Y. Giants → Baltimore (PD). The Giants traded a fourth-round selection to Baltimore in exchange for guard Ben Bredeson, a fifth-round selection, and a 2023 seventh-round selection.)
4	114	New York Giants	Dane Belton	S	Iowa	from Atlanta (Note: No. 114: Atlanta → N.Y. Giants (D). See No. 38: N.Y. Giants → Atlanta.)
4	120	Carolina Panthers	Brandon Smith	LB	Penn State	from New Orleans via Washington (Note: No. 120: New Orleans → Washington → Carolina. Multiple trades: No. 120: New Orleans → Washington (D). See No. 11: Washington → New Orleans. No. 120: Washington → Carolina (D). Washington traded fourth- and sixth-round selections (120th and 189th overall) to Carolina in exchange for two fifth-round selections (144th and 149th overall).)
4	129	Dallas Cowboys	Jake Ferguson	TE	Wisconsin	
4	130	Baltimore Ravens	Jordan Stout	P	Penn State	from Buffalo (Note: No. 130: Buffalo → Baltimore (D). See No. 23: Baltimore → Buffalo.)
4	131	Tennessee Titans	Hassan Haskins	RB	Michigan	
4*	143	Tennessee Titans	Chig Okonkwo	TE	Maryland	
5	146	New York Giants	Micah McFadden	LB	Indiana	from N.Y. Jets (Note: No. 146: N.Y. Jets → N.Y. Giants (D). See No. 36: N.Y. Giants → N.Y. Jets.)
5	158	Seattle Seahawks	Tyreke Smith	DE	Ohio State	from Miami via New England and Kansas City (Note: No. 158: Miami → New England → Kansas City → Seattle. Multiple trades: No. 158: Miami → New England (PD). Miami traded a fifth-round selection and wide receiver DeVante Parker to New England in exchange for a 2023 third-round selection. No. 158: New England → Kansas City (D). See No. 50: Kansas City → New England. No. 158: Kansas City → Seattle (D). See No. 145: Seattle → Kansas City.)
5	165	Minnesota Vikings	Esezi Otomewo	DE	Minnesota	from Las Vegas (Note: No. 165: Las Vegas → Minnesota (D) See No. 126: Las Vegas → Minnesota → Las Vegas.)
6	184	Minnesota Vikings	Vederian Lowe	T	Illinois	from N.Y. Jets (Note: No. 184: N.Y. Jets → Minnesota (PD). See No. 117: Minnesota → N.Y. Jets.)
6	191	Minnesota Vikings	Jalen Nailor	WR	Michigan State	from Baltimore via Kansas City (Note: No. 191: Baltimore → Kansas City → Minnesota. Multiple trades: Baltimore → Kansas City (PD). See No. 173: Kansas City → Baltimore. Kansas City → Minnesota (PD). Kansas City traded a sixth-round selection to Minnesota in exchange for cornerback Mike Hughes and a seventh-round selection.)
6	206	Denver Broncos	Matt Henningsen	DT	Wisconsin	from Tampa Bay via N.Y. Jets and Philadelphia (Note: No. 206: Tampa Bay → N.Y. Jets → Philadelphia → Denver. Multiple trades: Tampa Bay → N.Y. Jets (PD). Tampa Bay traded a sixth-round selection to the New York Jets in exchange for nose tackle Steve McLendon and a 2023 seventh-round selection. N.Y. Jets → Philadelphia (PD). The Jets traded a conditional sixth-round selection to Philadelphia in exchange for quarterback Joe Flacco. The pick would have been elevated to the fifth round if Flacco had met playing time conditions. Philadelphia → Denver (PD). Philadelphia traded a sixth-round selection to Denver in exchange for cornerback Kary Vincent Jr.)
6	207	Chicago Bears	Doug Kramer	C	Illinois	from San Francisco via N.Y. Jets and Houston (Note: No. 207: San Francisco → N.Y. Jets → Houston → Chicago. Multiple trades: No. 207: San Francisco → N.Y. Jets (PD). San Francisco traded a sixth-round selection to the New York Jets in exchange for linebacker Jordan Willis and a 2021 seventh-round selection. No. 207: N.Y. Jets → Houston (PD). The Jets traded this sixth-round selection to Houston in exchange for linebacker Shaq Lawson. No. 207: Houston → Chicago (D). See No. 150: Chicago → Houston.)
6	208	Pittsburgh Steelers	Connor Heyward	FB	Michigan State	from Kansas City (Note: No. 208: Kansas City → Pittsburgh (PD). Kansas City traded a sixth-round selection to Pittsburgh in exchange for defensive end Melvin Ingram.)
6*	218	Tampa Bay Buccaneers	Ko Kieft	TE	Minnesota	from L.A. Rams
6*	221	San Francisco 49ers	Tariq Castro-Fields	CB	Penn State	
7	229	Seattle Seahawks	Bo Melton	WR	Rutgers	
7	232	Denver Broncos	Faion Hicks	DB	Wisconsin	
7	238	Las Vegas Raiders	Thayer Munford	T	Ohio State	from Miami via L.A. Rams (Note: No. 238: Miami → L.A. Rams (PD). Miami traded a seventh-round selection to the Los Angeles Rams in exchange for cornerback Aqib Talib and a 2020 fifth-round selection originally acquired from Baltimore.)
7	245	New England Patriots	Andrew Stueber	G	Michigan	from Dallas via Houston (Note: No. 245: Dallas → Houston → New England. Multiple trades: Dallas → Houston (PD). Dallas traded a seventh-round selection to Houston in exchange for defensive tackle Eli Ankou. Houston → New England (PD). See No. 170: New England → Houston.)
7	249	Green Bay Packers	Rasheed Walker	T	Penn State	
7	251	Kansas City Chiefs	Isiah Pacheco	RB	Rutgers	
7*	256	Arizona Cardinals	Jesse Luketa	LB	Penn State	
7*	258	Green Bay Packers	Samori Toure	WR	Nebraska	
7*	260	Los Angeles Chargers	Zander Horvath	FB	Purdue	
7*	261	Los Angeles Rams	A. J. Arcuri	T	Michigan State	from Tampa Bay

Trades In the explanations below, (PD) indicates trades completed prior to the start of the draft (i.e. Pre-Draft), while (D) denotes trades that took place during the 2022 draft.

Round one

Round two

Round three

Round four

Round five

Round six

Round seven

== Head coaches ==
Team	Head coach	Years at school	Overall record	Record at school	B1G record
Illinois	Bret Bielema*	1	102–65 (.611)	5–7 (.417)	41–24 (.631)
Indiana	Tom Allen*	5	26–32 (.448)	26–32 (.448)	15–28 (.349)
Iowa	Kirk Ferentz	23	190–131 (.592)	178–110 (.618)	110–79 (.582)
Maryland	Mike Locksley*	3	15–49 (.234)	13–23 (.361)	7–22 (.241)
Michigan	Jim Harbaugh	7	119–51 (.700)	61–24 (.718)	42–17 (.712)
Michigan State	Mel Tucker	2	18–14 (.563)	13–7 (.650)	9–7 (.563)
Minnesota	P. J. Fleck	5	65–45 (.591)	35–23 (.603)	21–22 (.488)
Nebraska	Scott Frost	4	34–36 (.486)	15–29 (.341)	10–25 (.286)
Northwestern	Pat Fitzgerald	16	109–90 (.548)	109–90 (.548)	64–68 (.485)
Ohio State	Ryan Day*	3	34–4 (.895)	34–4 (.895)	23–1 (.958)
Penn State	James Franklin	8	91–49 (.650)	67–34 (.663)	42–28 (.600)
Purdue	Jeff Brohm	5	58–39 (.598)	28–29 (.491)	20–22 (.476)
Rutgers	Greg Schiano*	13	76–81 (.484)	76–81 (.484)	5–13 (.278)
Wisconsin	Paul Chryst	7	84–42 (.667)	65–23 (.739)	43–16 (.729)

* Bret Bielema coached in the Big Ten from 2006 through 2012 at Wisconsin, going 37-19 in Big Ten play and winning three Big Ten championships.

* Tom Allen was hired to replace Kevin Wilson in December 2016 at Indiana and coached the Hoosiers in their 2016 bowl game, going 0–1.

* Mike Locksley served as interim head coach at Maryland in 2015 and coached for six games, going 1–5.

* Ryan Day served as interim head coach at Ohio State for the first three games of the 2018 season while Urban Meyer served a three-game suspension and went 3–0.

* Greg Schiano served as head coach at Rutgers from 2001 through 2011 then left for the NFL. Following the conclusion of the 2019 season, Schiano returned to Rutgers for his second stint as head coach. The Scarlet Knights competed in the Big East Conference in his previous stay at the school.
