= Doug Kramer Jr. =

American football player (born 1998)

Doug Kramer
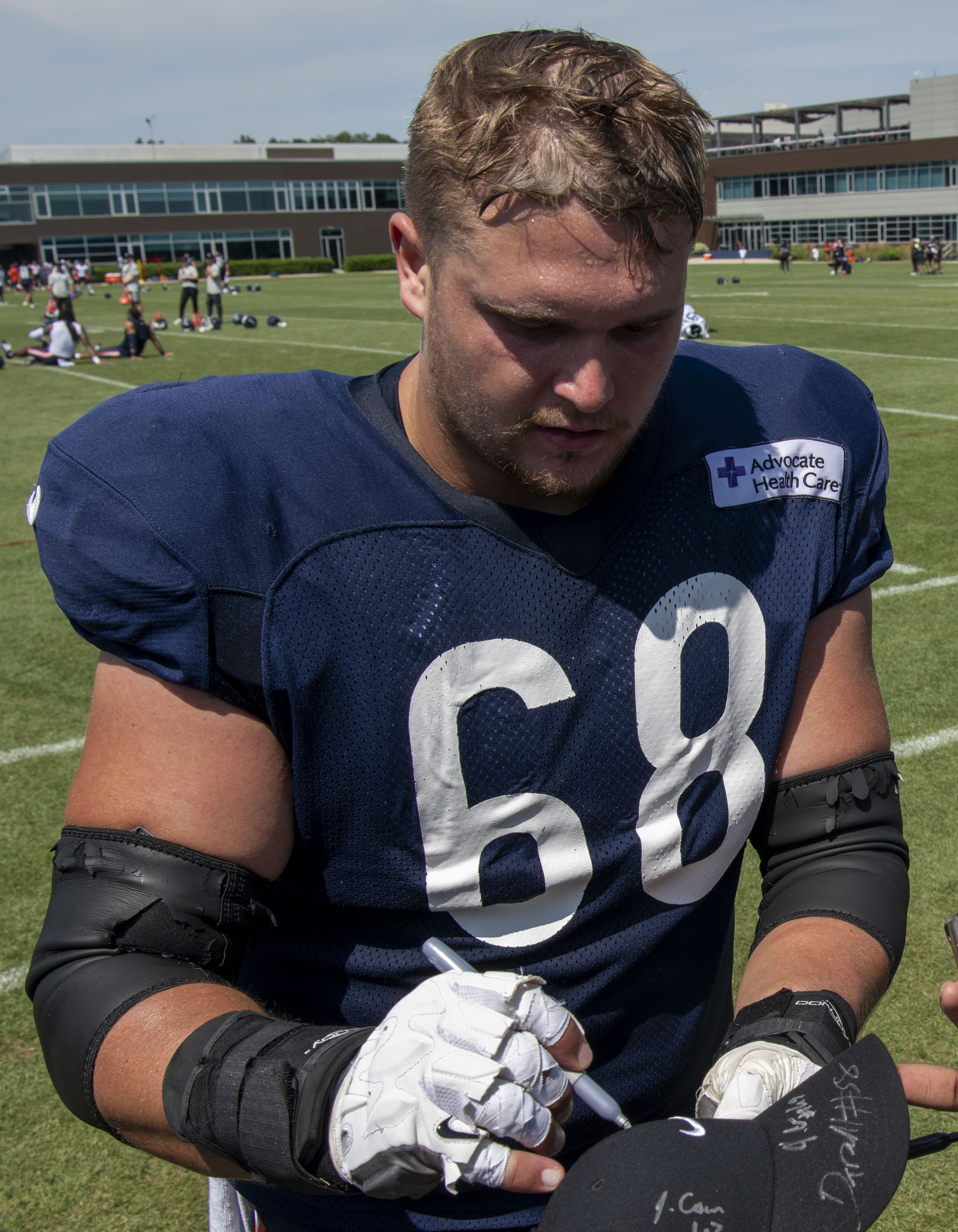
- Kramer with the Chicago Bears in 2024

Profile
- Position: Center

Personal information
- Born: June 4, 1998 (age 28); Hinsdale, Illinois, U.S.
- Listed height: 6 ft 2 in (1.88 m)
- Listed weight: 301 lb (137 kg)

Career information
- High school: Hinsdale Central
- College: Illinois (2016–2021)
- NFL draft: 2022: 6th round, 207th overall pick

Career history
- Chicago Bears (2022–2023); Arizona Cardinals (2023); Chicago Bears (2023–2024); Seattle Seahawks (2025)*; Louisville Kings (2026)*; San Francisco 49ers (2026)*
- * Offseason or practice squad member only

Awards and highlights
- Second-team All-Big Ten (2021)

Career NFL statistics
- Games played: 18
- Stats at Pro Football Reference

Doug Kramer Jr. (born June 4, 1998) is an American professional football center. He played college football for the Illinois Fighting Illini and was selected by the Bears in the sixth round of the 2022 NFL draft.

== College career ==
Kramer was ranked as a three–star recruit by 247Sports.com coming out of high school. He committed to Illinois on January 15, 2016, over offers from Ball State and Florida Atlantic.

== Professional career ==
Pre-draft measurables
Height	Weight	Arm length	Hand span	Wingspan	40-yard dash	10-yard split	20-yard split	20-yard shuttle	Three-cone drill	Vertical jump	Broad jump	Bench press
6 ft 2 in (1.88 m)	301 lb (137 kg)	32 1/4 in (0.82 m)	9 5/8 in (0.24 m)	6 ft 4 1/4 in (1.94 m)	4.95 s	1.70 s	2.84 s	4.62 s	7.82 s	29.5 in (0.75 m)	9 ft 1 in (2.77 m)	26 reps
All values from Pro Day

=== Chicago Bears ===
Kramer was selected by the Chicago Bears with the 207th pick in the sixth round of the 2022 NFL draft on April 30, 2022. He was placed on injured reserve on August 16.

On August 31, 2023, Kramer was placed on injured reserve. He was activated from injured reserve on October 21, and made his NFL debut in week seven. He was waived on November 4.

=== Arizona Cardinals ===
On November 6, 2023, Kramer was claimed off waivers by the Arizona Cardinals. He was released on November 15.

=== Chicago Bears (second stint) ===
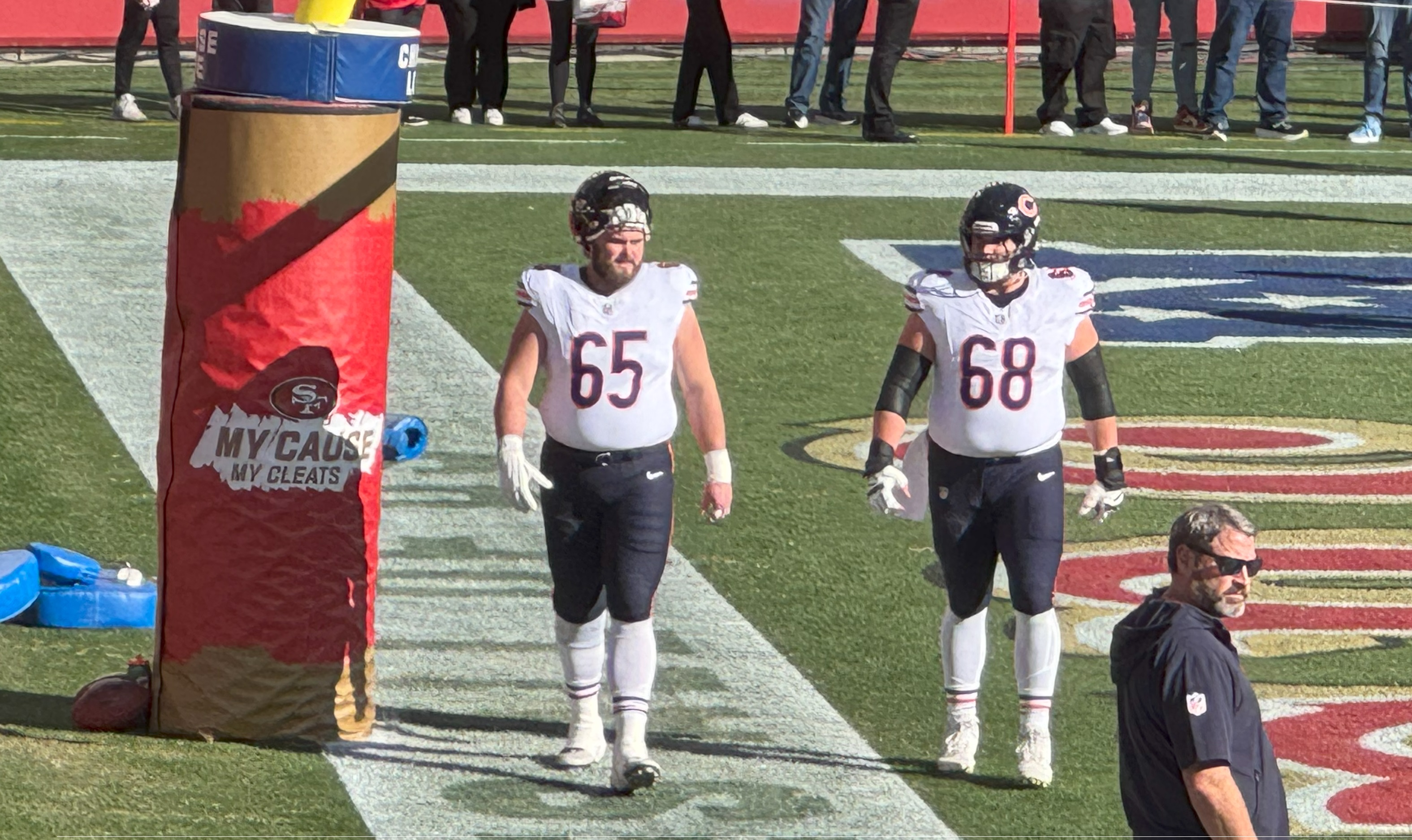
Kramer (right) with Coleman Shelton in 2024

On November 17, 2023, Kramer was signed to the Bears practice squad. He signed a reserve/future contract with the Bears on January 16, 2024.

Kramer began the 2024 season as a backup center. During the Week 4 game against the Los Angeles Rams, he played fullback on certain short yardage situations, one of which resulted in a one-yard touchdown run by Roschon Johnson. The snaps were his first in the NFL that did not end in a quarterback kneel.

On October 27, 2024, with only a few minutes left in the Week 8 game against the Washington Commanders, Kramer took a handoff at the one yard line, which he fumbled. The Bears went on to lose, 18–15, on a Hail Mary pass play thrown by the Commanders' Jayden Daniels known as the Hail Maryland.

On March 18, 2025, the Bears re-signed Kramer to a one-year contract. He was waived on August 26 with an injury designation.

=== Seattle Seahawks ===
On November 20, 2025, Kramer was signed to the Seattle Seahawks' practice squad. He was released on December 2.

=== Louisville Kings ===
On January 14, 2026, Kramer was selected by the Louisville Kings of the United Football League (UFL).

=== San Francisco 49ers ===
On August 10, 2026, Kramer signed a one-year deal with the San Francisco 49ers. On August 30, he was released by the 49ers as a part of final roster cuts.
