= Austin Allen (tight end) =

American football player (born 1998)

Profile
- Position: Tight end

Personal information
- Born: November 10, 1998 (age 27); Aurora, Nebraska, U.S.
- Listed height: 6 ft 8 in (2.03 m)
- Listed weight: 252 lb (114 kg)

Career information
- High school: Aurora (Aurora, NE)
- College: Nebraska (2017–2021)
- NFL draft: 2022: undrafted

Career history
- New York Giants (2022)*; Green Bay Packers (2022–2023)*; Arlington Renegades (2024)
- * Offseason or practice squad member only

Awards and highlights
- Big Ten Tight End of the Year (2021); First-team All-Big Ten (2021)
- Stats at Pro Football Reference

Austin Allen (born November 10, 1998) is an American football tight end. He played college football at Nebraska.

== Early life ==
Allen grew up in Phillips, Nebraska, and attended Aurora High School, where he played football and basketball. As a junior, he caught 41 passes for 507 yards and eight touchdowns. Allen committed to play college football at Nebraska over offers from Iowa, Iowa State, UCLA, and UCF.

== College career ==
Allen redshirted his true freshman season. As a redshirt freshman he caught two passes for 54 yards. Allen played in all 12 of Nebraska's games and had seven receptions for 83 yards during his redshirt sophomore season. He started seven games as a redshirt junior and caught 18 passes for 236 yards and one touchdown. In his redshirt senior season Allen set school records for tight ends with 38 receptions and 602 receiving yards and scored three touchdowns. He was named first-team All-Big Ten Conference and the Kwalick–Clark Tight End of the Year at the end of the season.

== Professional career ==
Pre-draft measurables
Height	Weight	Arm length	Hand span	Wingspan	40-yard dash	10-yard split	20-yard split	20-yard shuttle	Three-cone drill	Vertical jump	Broad jump	Bench press
6 ft 7 5/8 in (2.02 m)	253 lb (115 kg)	33 5/8 in (0.85 m)	9 1/2 in (0.24 m)	6 ft 8 7/8 in (2.05 m)	4.83 s	1.62 s	2.77 s	4.26 s	7.00 s	34.0 in (0.86 m)	10 ft 1 in (3.07 m)	8 reps
All values from NFL Combine/Pro Day

=== New York Giants ===
Allen was signed by the New York Giants as an undrafted free agent on April 30, 2022, shortly after the conclusion of the 2022 NFL draft. He was waived on August 30, 2022 and signed to the practice squad the next day. On October 18, 2022, the Giants released Allen from their practice squad.

=== Green Bay Packers ===
On January 3, 2023, Allen was signed to the Green Bay Packers practice squad. He signed a reserve/future contract on January 10, 2023. He was released on August 29, 2023. A day later, he was signed to the Packers' practice squad. He was released on September 12, 2023.

=== Arlington Renegades ===
On January 19, 2024, Allen signed with the Arlington Renegades of the United Football League (UFL).
