= Olakunle Fatukasi =

American football player (born 1999)

Profile
- Position: Linebacker

Personal information
- Born: June 11, 1999 (age 27); Far Rockaway, New York, U.S.
- Listed height: 6 ft 1 in (1.85 m)
- Listed weight: 248 lb (112 kg)

Career information
- High school: Grand Street Campus (Brooklyn, New York)
- College: Rutgers (2017–2021)
- NFL draft: 2022: undrafted

Career history
- Tampa Bay Buccaneers (2022); Denver Broncos (2022)*; New England Patriots (2023)*; Kansas City Chiefs (2023)*; Los Angeles Rams (2023–2024); St. Louis Battlehawks (2025); Birmingham Stallions (2026)
- * Offseason or practice squad member only

Awards and highlights
- Second-team All-Big Ten (2020); Third-team All-Big Ten (2021)

Career NFL statistics as of 2023
- Total tackles: 7
- Stats at Pro Football Reference

Olakunle Fatukasi (born June 11, 1999) is an American professional football linebacker. He played college football at Rutgers.

== College career ==
Fatukasi committed to Rutgers as a three star recruit in 2016 as a part of their 2017 class. In His freshman year, he appeared in all twelve of Rutgers' games. In 2018 he appeared in eleven games compiling twenty tackles between linebacker and special teams. In 2019 he contributed in all twelve games Rutgers played starting ten of them at weak-side linebacker. In the covid season of 2020 his first under Greg Schiano, Fatukasi was named a team captain. He started all nine games and led the Big Ten Conference in tackles. At one point during the season he was named the Big Ten Co-Defensive player of the week. He was named as a semifinalists for the Butkus Award and earned First-team All-Big Ten from the media and second-team from the coaches. He came back to Rutgers for the 2021 season, due to the NCAA COVID-19 exemption. It was announced he would be switching from outside to inside linebacker for the 2021 season. He finished the 2021 season named third-team all Big Ten even though he missed multiple games due to injury.

== Professional career ==
Pre-draft measurables
Height	Weight	Arm length	Hand span	Wingspan	40-yard dash	10-yard split	20-yard split	20-yard shuttle	Three-cone drill	Vertical jump	Broad jump	Bench press
6 ft 1 1/4 in (1.86 m)	234 lb (106 kg)	32 7/8 in (0.84 m)	9 1/2 in (0.24 m)	6 ft 6 in (1.98 m)	4.79 s	1.63 s	2.78 s	4.36 s	6.76 s	38.0 in (0.97 m)	10 ft 2 in (3.10 m)	21 reps
All values from Pro Day

=== Tampa Bay Buccaneers ===
Fatukasi signed with the Tampa Bay Buccaneers as an undrafted free agent on May 13, 2022. He made the Buccaneers' initial 53-man roster out of training camp. He played in 13 games before being waived on December 13, 2022.

=== Denver Broncos ===
On December 16, 2022, Fatukasi was signed to the practice squad of the Denver Broncos. On January 11, 2023, Fatukasi was released by the Broncos.

=== New England Patriots ===
On January 18, 2023, Fatukasi signed a reserve/future contract with the New England Patriots. On August 12, Fatukasi was waived by the Patriots.

=== Kansas City Chiefs ===
On August 15, 2023, Fatukasi signed with the Kansas City Chiefs. He was waived with injury designation on August 29. He reverted to the Chiefs' injured reserve after going unclaimed on waivers. On September 1, he was released from injured reserve after reaching an injury settlement with the Chiefs.

=== Los Angeles Rams ===
Fatukasi signed with the Los Angeles Rams practice squad on October 11, 2023. He signed a reserve/future contract on January 15, 2024.

Fatukasi was waived on August 25, 2024.

=== St. Louis Battlehawks ===
On December 4, 2024, Fatukasi signed with the St. Louis Battlehawks of the United Football League (UFL). He was released on May 14, 2025.

=== Birmingham Stallions ===
On January 13, 2026, Fatukasi was selected by the Birmingham Stallions in the 2026 UFL Draft.

== Personal life ==
Fatukasi is of Nigerian descent. He has two brothers, his younger brother Tunde, previously played at Rutgers and now plays at Bowling Green. His older brother, Folorunso played football at UConn and currently plays for the Houston Texans. He has his own t-shirt company called O3.
