= Boye Mafe =

American football player (born 1998)

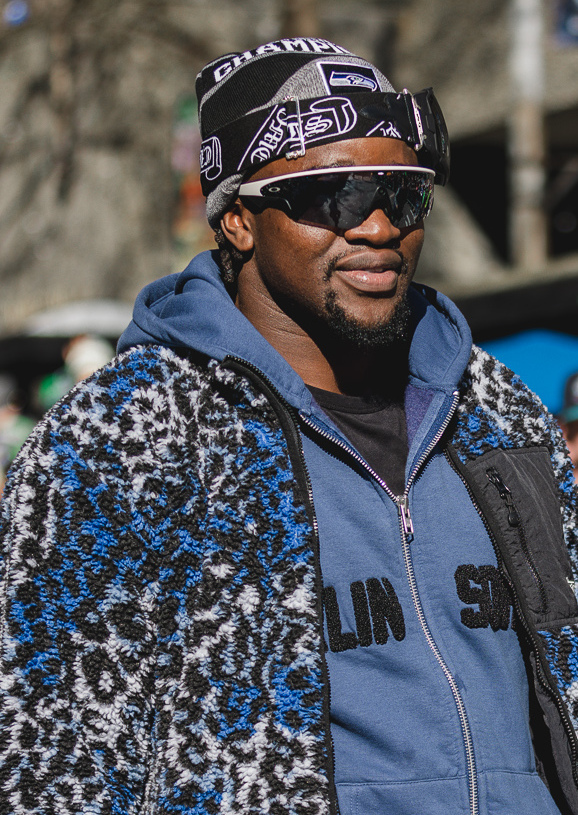
- Mafe in 2026

No. 53 – Cincinnati Bengals
- Position: Defensive end
- Roster status: Active

Personal information
- Born: November 30, 1998 (age 27); Golden Valley, Minnesota, U.S.
- Listed height: 6 ft 4 in (1.93 m)
- Listed weight: 261 lb (118 kg)

Career information
- High school: Hopkins (Minnetonka, Minnesota)
- College: Minnesota (2017–2021)
- NFL draft: 2022: 2nd round, 40th overall pick

Career history
- Seattle Seahawks (2022–2025); Cincinnati Bengals (2026–present)

Awards and highlights
- Super Bowl champion (LX); Second-team All-Big Ten (2021)

Career NFL statistics as of Week 10, 2026
- Total tackles: 189
- Sacks: 26.5
- Forced fumbles: 5
- Fumble recoveries: 3
- Pass deflections: 15
- Stats at Pro Football Reference

Boye Mafe (born November 30, 1998) is an American professional football defensive end for the Cincinnati Bengals of the National Football League (NFL). He played college football for the Minnesota Golden Gophers. Mafe won Super Bowl LX with the Seattle Seahawks.

== Early life ==
Mafe's parents, Wale and Bola, came to the United States from Nigeria. Mafe grew up in Golden Valley, Minnesota and attended Hopkins High School in Minnetonka, Minnesota. As a senior he was named All-Metro after recording 78 tackles, 10 tackles for loss, and four sacks.

== College career ==
Mafe redshirted his true freshman season. As a redshirt sophomore he recorded 14 tackles, 3.5 tackles for loss, and three sacks. Mafe was named honorable mention All-Big Ten Conference after recording 27 tackles, 5.5 for loss, and 4.5 sacks with two passes defended and two forced fumbles in six games played in the team's COVID-19-shortened 2020 season.

== Professional career ==
Pre-draft measurables
Height	Weight	Arm length	Hand span	Wingspan	40-yard dash	10-yard split	20-yard split	20-yard shuttle	Three-cone drill	Vertical jump	Broad jump	Bench press
6 ft 3 3/4 in (1.92 m)	261 lb (118 kg)	32 5/8 in (0.83 m)	9 7/8 in (0.25 m)	6 ft 8 3/4 in (2.05 m)	4.53 s	1.59 s	2.65 s	4.46 s	7.24 s	41.5 in (1.05 m)	10 ft 5 in (3.18 m)	21 reps
All values from NFL Combine/Pro Day

=== Seattle Seahawks ===
Mafe was drafted 40th overall by the Seattle Seahawks in the second round of the 2022 NFL draft. The Seahawks acquired the 40th overall selection from the Denver Broncos in the Russell Wilson trade. Mafe recorded his first career sack in Week 2 of his rookie season against the San Francisco 49ers. He finished his rookie season with three sacks and 41 total tackles (28 solo).

In week 10 of the 2023 season, Mafe recorded a sack against Sam Howell in a 29–26 victory over the Washington Commanders, setting a franchise record for the most sacks in consecutive games with seven. In Week 16, against the Tennessee Titans, he had his first game with two sacks in the 20–17 win. He finished the 2023 season with nine sacks, 52 total tackles (35 solo), six passes defended, one forced fumble, and two fumble recoveries.

Mafe started off the 2024 season with three consecutive games with a sack before missing Weeks 4–5 with a knee injury. He finished the 2024 season with six sacks, 40 total tackles (25 solo), and three passes defended.

In the 2025 season, Mafe had two sacks, 31 total tackles (11 solo), and five passes defended. Mafe played in Super Bowl LX. He won his first NFL championship when the Seahawks defeated the Patriots 29–13.

=== Cincinnati Bengals ===
On March 12, 2026, Mafe signed a three-year deal with the Cincinnati Bengals worth $60 million, with $19 million guaranteed.

== NFL career statistics ==
Legend
	Won the Super Bowl
**Bold**	Career high

=== Regular season ===
Year	Team	Games		Tackles					Interceptions						Fumbles				
Year	Team	GP	GS	Cmb	Solo	Ast	Sck	TFL	Int	Yds	Avg	Lng	TD	PD	FF	Fum	FR	Yds	TD
2022	SEA	17	3	41	28	13	3.0	3	0	0	0.0	0	0	0	0	0	0	0	0
2023	SEA	16	16	**52**	**35**	17	**9.0**	**9**	0	0	0.0	0	0	**6**	**1**	0	**2**	**3**	0
2024	SEA	15	11	40	25	15	6.0	8	0	0	0.0	0	0	3	1	0	0	0	0
2025	SEA	17	4	31	11	**20**	2.0	4	0	0	0.0	0	0	5	1	0	0	0	0
2026	CIN	9	9	25	15	20	6.5	8	0	0	0.0	0	0	1	**2**	0	1	0	0
Career		74	43	189	114	75	26.5	32	0	0	0.0	0	0	15	5	0	3	3	0

=== Postseason ===
Year	Team	Games		Tackles					Interceptions						Fumbles				
Year	Team	GP	GS	Cmb	Solo	Ast	Sck	TFL	Int	Yds	Avg	Lng	TD	PD	FF	Fum	FR	Yds	TD
2022	SEA	1	0	2	2	0	0.0	0	0	0	0.0	0	0	0	0	0	0	0	0
2025	SEA	3	0	**5**	**3**	**2**	0.0	0	0	0	0.0	0	0	0	0	0	0	0	0
Career		4	0	7	5	2	0.0	0	0	0	0.0	0	0	0	0	0	0	0	0
