= Arnold Ebiketie =

Cameroonian gridiron football player (born 1999)

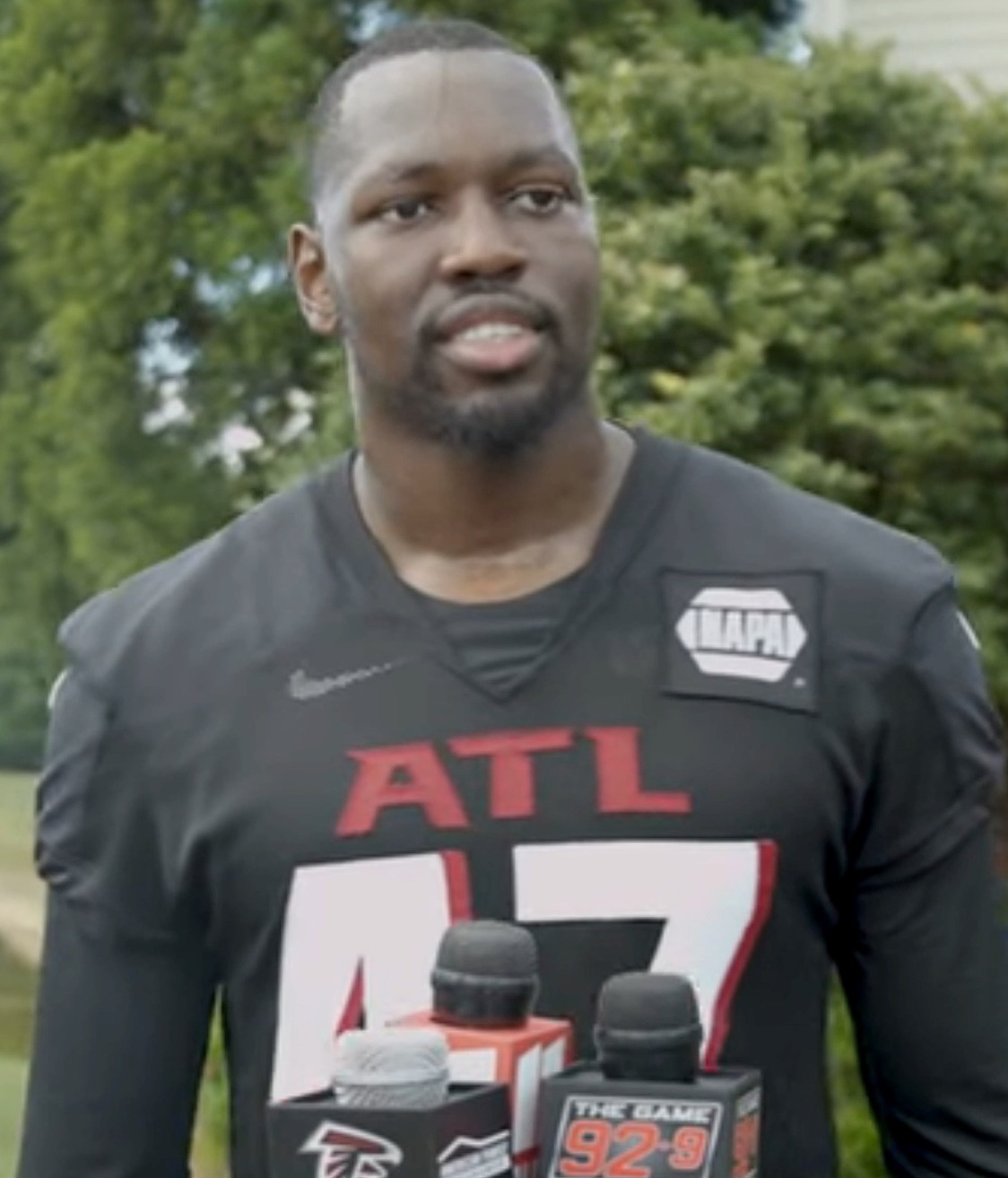
- Ebiketie in 2022

No. 17 – Philadelphia Eagles
- Position: Outside linebacker
- Roster status: Active

Personal information
- Born: 23 January 1999 (age 27); Yaoundé, Cameroon
- Listed height: 6 ft 2 in (1.88 m)
- Listed weight: 250 lb (113 kg)

Career information
- High school: Albert Einstein (Kensington, Maryland, U.S.)
- College: Temple (2017–2020); Penn State (2021)
- NFL draft: 2022: 2nd round, 38th overall pick

Career history
- Atlanta Falcons (2022–2025); Philadelphia Eagles (2026–present)

Awards and highlights
- First-team All-Big Ten (2021); Second-team All-AAC (2020)

Career NFL statistics as of 2024
- Total tackles: 129
- Sacks: 16.5
- Forced fumbles: 4
- Fumble recoveries: 1
- Pass deflections: 6
- Stats at Pro Football Reference

Arnold Kevin Ebiketie (/ˌɛbɪˈkeɪti/ EBB-ih-KAY-tee; born 23 January 1999) is a Cameroonian professional American football outside linebacker for the Philadelphia Eagles of the National Football League (NFL). He played college football for the Temple Owls and Penn State Nittany Lions.

== Early life ==
Ebiketie originally attended Richard Montgomery High School in Rockville, Maryland before transferring to Albert Einstein High School in Kensington, Maryland. As a senior he had 21.5 sacks. He committed to Temple University to play college football.

== College career ==
Ebiketie played at Temple from 2017 to 2020. While at Temple, he had 58 tackles and six sacks. After the 2020 season, he transferred to Penn State University. He became a starter his first year at Penn State.

== Professional career ==
Pre-draft measurables
Height	Weight	Arm length	Hand span	Wingspan	40-yard dash	10-yard split	20-yard split	20-yard shuttle	Three-cone drill	Vertical jump	Broad jump	Bench press
6 ft 2 3/8 in (1.89 m)	250 lb (113 kg)	34 1/8 in (0.87 m)	10 1/4 in (0.26 m)	6 ft 9 3/4 in (2.08 m)	4.66 s	1.69 s	2.64 s	4.24 s	6.95 s	38.0 in (0.97 m)	10 ft 8 in (3.25 m)	21 reps
All values from NFL Combine/Pro Day

=== Atlanta Falcons ===
Ebiketie was selected by the Atlanta Falcons in the second round, 38th overall, 2022 NFL draft. Ebiketie made his season debut in Week 1 against the New Orleans Saints where he recorded his first professional sack. Ebiketie made his first professional start in Week 6 against the San Francisco 49ers, he made five tackles in the 28–14 win. In Week 10 against the Chicago Bears, Ebiketie recorded a season-high six tackles and a sack in the 27–24 win.

Ebiketie finished the season with 30 total tackles, 2.5 sacks, and two forced fumbles.

=== Philadelphia Eagles ===
On 13 March 2026, the Philadelphia Eagles signed Ebiketie to a one-year, $7.3 million contract. At the trade deadline, it was widely reported that Ebiketie was traded to the Cincinnati Bengals in exchange for a sixth-round pick in the 2027 NFL draft. However, the trade was called off after the Bengals backed out of the trade upon realizing their third-round compensatory pick they were expected to received when Trey Hendrickson signed with the Baltimore Ravens would have been cancelled out had the trade gone through.

== NFL career statistics ==
=== Regular season ===
Year	Team	Games		Tackles					Fumbles				Interceptions			
Year	Team	GP	GS	Cmb	Solo	Ast	Sck	TFL	FF	FR	Yds	TD	Int	Yds	TD	PD
2022	ATL	16	1	30	21	9	2.5	3	2	0	0	0	0	0	0	2
2023	ATL	17	6	25	16	9	6.0	3	2	0	0	0	0	0	0	1
2024	ATL	17	2	38	26	12	6.0	6	0	1	0	0	0	0	0	2
2025	ATL	17	3	36	17	19	2.0	5	0	0	0	0	0	0	0	1
Career		67	12	129	80	49	16.5	17	4	1	0	0	0	0	0	6
