= Matt Henningsen =

American football player (born 1999)

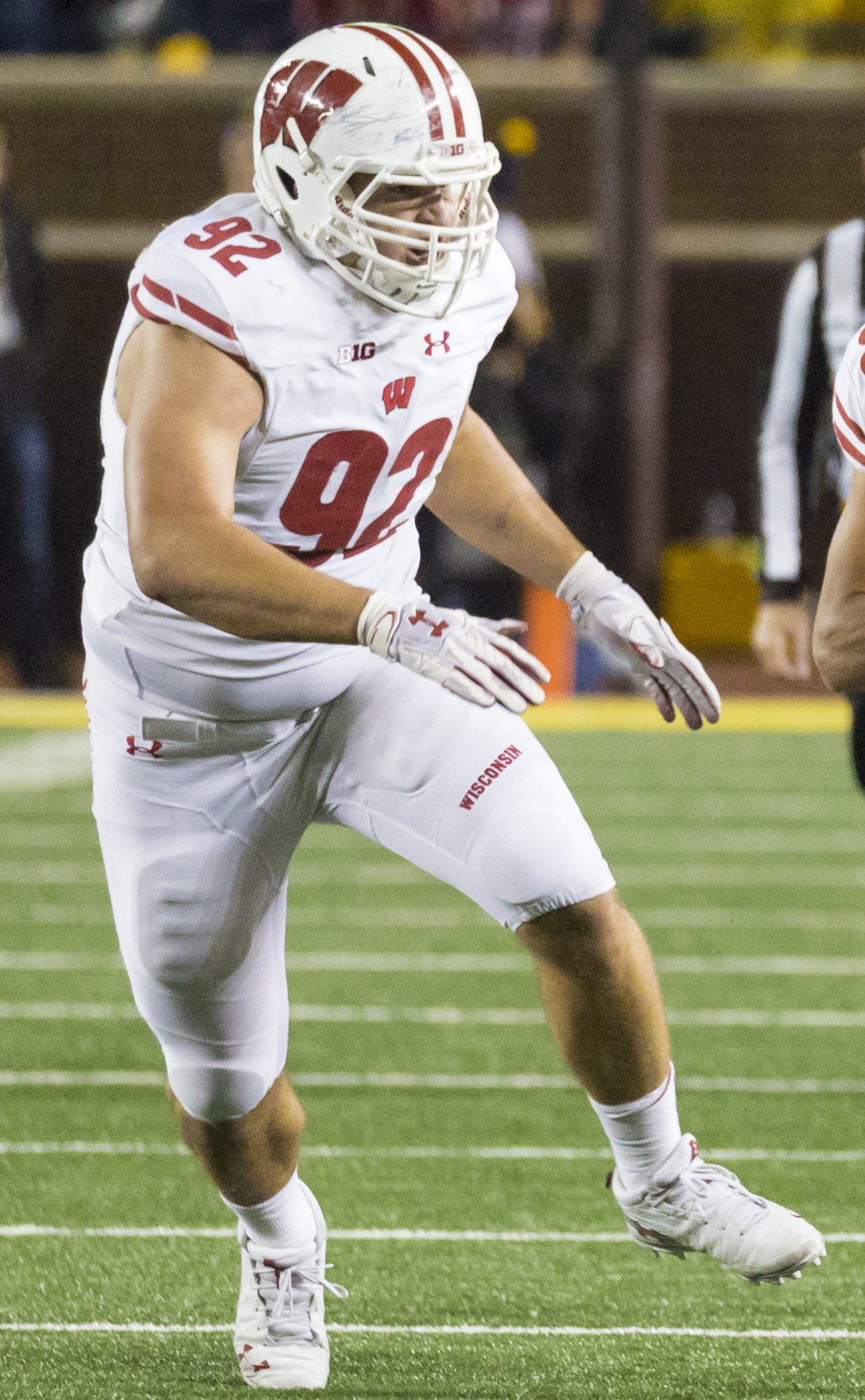
- Henningsen with the Wisconsin Badgers in 2018

No. 91 – Denver Broncos
- Position: Defensive end
- Roster status: Injured reserve

Personal information
- Born: July 9, 1999 (age 27); Menomonee Falls, Wisconsin, U.S.
- Listed height: 6 ft 3 in (1.91 m)
- Listed weight: 291 lb (132 kg)

Career information
- High school: Menomonee Falls
- College: Wisconsin (2017–2021)
- NFL draft: 2022: 6th round, 206th overall pick

Career history
- Denver Broncos (2022–present)

Awards and highlights
- Third-team All-Big Ten (2021)

Career NFL statistics as of 2024
- Total tackles: 40
- Sacks: 1
- Pass deflections: 2
- Stats at Pro Football Reference

Matthew D. Henningsen (born July 9, 1999) is an American professional football defensive end for the Denver Broncos of the National Football League (NFL). He played college football for the Wisconsin Badgers and was selected by the Broncos in the sixth round of the 2022 NFL draft.

== Professional career ==
Pre-draft measurables
Height	Weight	Arm length	Hand span	Wingspan	10-yard split	20-yard shuttle	Three-cone drill	Vertical jump	Broad jump	Bench press
6 ft 3 3/8 in (1.91 m)	289 lb (131 kg)	33 1/8 in (0.84 m)	9 3/8 in (0.24 m)	6 ft 10 1/8 in (2.09 m)	1.75 s	4.29 s	7.19 s	37.5 in (0.95 m)	9 ft 11 in (3.02 m)	22 reps
All values from Pro Day

Henningsen was selected by the Denver Broncos in the sixth round, 206th overall, of the 2022 NFL draft. He appeared in all 17 games as a rookie. He finished with one sack and 21 total tackles. In the 2023 season, he appeared in all 17 games once again and had 19 total tackles and two passes defended.

On August 27, 2024, Henningsen was waived by the Broncos. The next day, he was re-signed to the Broncos' practice squad. He signed a reserve/future contract with Denver on January 13, 2025.

Upon suffering an torn Achilles during a joint practice with the San Francisco 49ers on August 7, 2025, Henningsen was designated as waived/injured three days later. He reverted to injured reserve the day after, ruling him out for the entire 2025 season.

On March 11, 2026, Henningsen signed a one-year extension with the Broncos. On August 7, exactly a year after his previous Achilles injury, Henningsen suffered a torn Achilles in his other foot, ending his season.

== Personal life ==
Outside of football, Henningsen is an avid chess player, streaming on Twitch. He also plays the fantasy role-playing game Dungeons & Dragons. Henningsen has a bachelor's and a master's degree in electrical engineering, and has contributed to neurosurgery research efforts at UW–Madison.

Henningsen has three brothers, all of whom also played football at Menomonee Falls and earned degrees at UW–Madison. His parents both worked as lawyers.
