= George Karlaftis =

Greek-born American football player (born 2001)

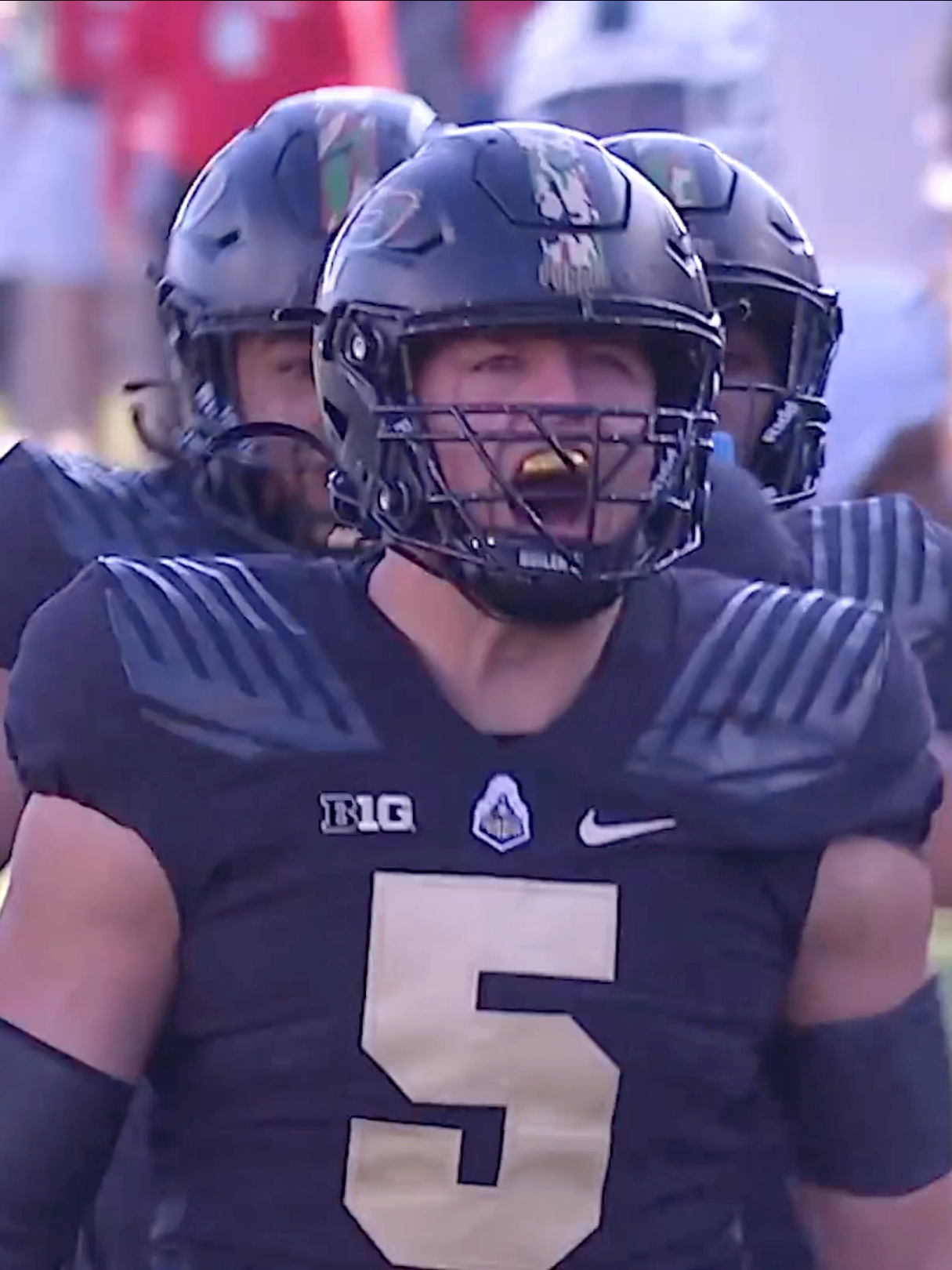
- Karlaftis with the Purdue Boilermakers in 2021

No. 56 – Kansas City Chiefs
- Position: Defensive end
- Roster status: Active

Personal information
- Born: 3 April 2001 (age 25); Athens, Greece
- Listed height: 6 ft 4 in (1.93 m)
- Listed weight: 263 lb (119 kg)

Career information
- High school: West Lafayette (West Lafayette, Indiana, U.S.)
- College: Purdue (2019–2021)
- NFL draft: 2022: 1st round, 30th overall pick

Career history
- Kansas City Chiefs (2022–present)

Awards and highlights
- 2× Super Bowl champion (LVII, LVIII); PFWA All-Rookie Team (2022); First-team All-American (2021); First-team All-Big Ten (2021); 2× second-team All-Big Ten (2019, 2020)

Career NFL statistics as of Week 7, 2026
- Total tackles: 187
- Sacks: 31.5
- Forced fumbles: 1
- Fumble recoveries: 3
- Pass deflections: 22
- Interceptions: 1
- Stats at Pro Football Reference

George Matthew Karlaftis III (Greek: Γιώργος Ματθαίου Καρλαύτης; kar-LAFF-tiss; born 3 April 2001) is a Greek professional American football defensive end for the Kansas City Chiefs of the National Football League (NFL). He was born in Athens and grew up as a multi-sport athlete playing football, track and field, basketball, and water polo, the latter of which he played with the Greek national team.

Karlaftis and his family moved to the United States when he was 13. He played college football for the Purdue Boilermakers, where he won all-Big Ten honors before being selected by the Chiefs in the first round of the 2022 NFL draft. In his debut season, Karlaftis was part of the Chiefs Super Bowl LVII winning roster and was a regular starter. In his second season, he was a key contributor in Kansas City's Super Bowl LVIII win.

== Early life ==
Karlaftis was born in Athens, Greece. His father Μathiós "Matthew" Karlaftis grew up as an all-around athlete in Greece and later earned a degree in civil engineering at the University of Miami before pursuing a doctorate at Purdue University. His mother Amy, who had grown up near Purdue in West Lafayette, Indiana, met Matthew while she was a freshman. After marrying, they settled in Athens. While Amy spoke English to the couple's four children at home, they were otherwise brought up in Greek culture.

In his early years in Athens, he played water polo as a goalkeeper in the youth ranks of Panathinaikos, the Greek team of which he is also an avid supporter.

Matthew died of a heart attack in 2014 while on the island of Kos where he was to deliver a speech at an engineering conference there. Following his death, Amy and her children moved back to West Lafayette, where George Karlaftis began attending West Lafayette High School. He was enlisted in the school's football team and had 41 sacks during his high school career. He also competed in track and field for the school, including winning back-to-back state championships in shot put. He played in the 2019 U.S. Army All-American Game, where he was named the Defensive Player of the Year. He graduated early from high school and enrolled at Purdue in January 2019.

== College career ==
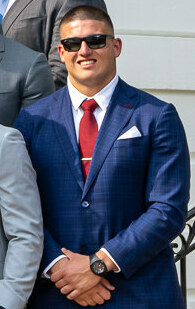
Karlaftis at the White House in 2023

As a true freshman at Purdue in 2019, Karlaftis started all 12 games, recording 54 tackles and 7.5 sacks. He only played in three games as a sophomore in 2020 due to a positive COVID-19 result, finishing the year with four tackles and two sacks. Karlaftis declared for the 2022 NFL draft following the 2021 season in which he recorded 4.5 sacks.

== Professional career ==
Pre-draft measurables
Height	Weight	Arm length	Hand span	Wingspan	40-yard dash	10-yard split	20-yard split	20-yard shuttle	Vertical jump	Broad jump	Bench press
6 ft 3 3/4 in (1.92 m)	266 lb (121 kg)	32 5/8 in (0.83 m)	10 1/4 in (0.26 m)	6 ft 6 7/8 in (2.00 m)	4.71 s	1.65 s	2.69 s	4.34 s	38.0 in (0.97 m)	10 ft 1 in (3.07 m)	21 reps
All values from NFL Combine/Pro Day

Karlaftis was selected by the Kansas City Chiefs in the first round (30th overall) of the 2022 NFL Draft. Karlaftis ended his rookie season with 33 tackles, six sacks, two fumble recoveries, and seven passes defended. He was named to the PFWA All-Rookie Team. The Chiefs reached Super Bowl LVII, where they defeated the Philadelphia Eagles 38–35, with Karlaftis recording two tackles in the game. Karlaftis's second season ended with 47 tackles, 10.5 sacks, one forced fumble, and three passes defended. Karlaftis helped the Chiefs reach Super Bowl LVIII where they defeated the San Francisco 49ers 25–22 to win their second straight championship. In the Super Bowl, Karlaftis recorded five tackles, 0.5 sacks, and a fumble recovery. In Super Bowl LIX, he had a sack in the 40–22 loss to the Eagles.

On April 29, 2025, the Chiefs exercised the fifth-year option in Karlaftis' contract. On July 20, 2025, he signed a four-year, $93 million contract extension with $62 million guaranteed.

== NFL career statistics ==
Legend
	Won the Super Bowl
	Led the league
**Bold**	Career high

=== Regular season ===
Year	Team	Games		Tackles					Fumbles				Interceptions					
Year	Team	GP	GS	Cmb	Solo	Ast	Sck	TFL	FF	FR	Yds	TD	Int	Yds	Avg	Lng	TD	PD
2022	KC	17	17	33	18	15	6.0	8	0	**2**	0	0	0	0	0.0	0	0	**7**
2023	KC	16	16	47	**29**	18	**10.5**	7	**1**	0	0	0	0	0	0.0	0	0	3
2024	KC	16	11	35	21	14	8.0	9	0	0	0	0	0	0	0.0	0	0	5
2025	KC	16	15	**48**	25	**23**	6.0	**10**	0	1	**1**	0	0	0	0.0	0	0	2
Career		65	59	163	93	70	30.5	34	1	3	1	0	0	0	0.0	0	0	17

=== Postseason ===
Year	Team	Games		Tackles					Fumbles				Interceptions					
Year	Team	GP	GS	Cmb	Solo	Ast	Sck	TFL	FF	FR	Yds	TD	Int	Yds	Avg	Lng	TD	PD
2022	KC	3	3	4	2	2	1.0	1	0	0	0	0	0	0	0.0	0	0	0
2023	KC	4	4	**19**	**10**	**9**	3.0	3	0	**2**	**2**	0	0	0	0.0	0	0	**1**
2024	KC	3	2	13	9	4	**4.0**	**4**	0	0	0	0	0	0	0.0	0	0	0
Career		10	9	36	21	15	8.0	8	0	2	2	0	0	0	0.0	0	0	1

== Personal life ==
Karlaftis was once a youth member of the Greece men's national water polo team. His father, Matthew, was a javelin thrower for the University of Miami's track and field team and also tried playing on their football team before suffering a severe skull injury during his first practice with them. His brother, Yanni, won a youth world championship in judo at 11 and joined the Boilermakers as an outside linebacker in 2021.

On May 9, 2026, Karlaftis married his high school sweetheart Kaia Harris in Glyfada, Greece.

Karlaftis is a Greek Orthodox Christian.
