= Alex Palczewski =

American football player (born 1999)

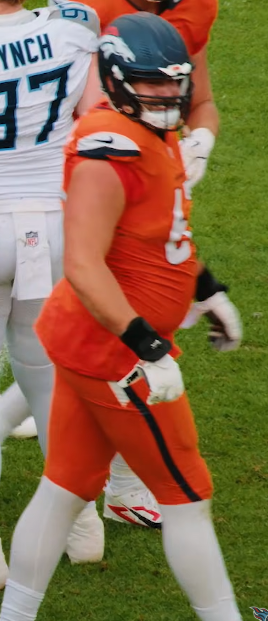
- Palczewski with the Denver Broncos in 2025

No. 63 – Denver Broncos
- Position: Offensive tackle
- Roster status: Active

Personal information
- Born: August 3, 1999 (age 27); Mount Prospect, Illinois, U.S.
- Listed height: 6 ft 6 in (1.98 m)
- Listed weight: 314 lb (142 kg)

Career information
- High school: Prospect (Mount Prospect, Illinois)
- College: Illinois (2017–2022)
- NFL draft: 2023: undrafted

Career history
- Denver Broncos (2023–present)

Awards and highlights
- Second-team All-Big Ten (2022); Third-team All-Big Ten (2019)

Career NFL statistics as of 2025
- Games played: 31
- Games started: 13
- Stats at Pro Football Reference

Alex Andrzej Palczewski (/pɑːlˈtʃɛvski/ pahl-CHEV-skee; born August 3, 1999), nicknamed "Palcho", is an American professional football offensive tackle for the Denver Broncos of the National Football League (NFL). Palczewski played college football for the Illinois Fighting Illini where he was named a college football All-American for the 2022 season. He was signed by the Broncos as an undrafted free agent in 2023.

== Early life ==
Palczewski was born in Mount Prospect, Illinois to Andrzej and Bozena Palczewski, both immigrants from communist Poland who moved to the United States in the mid-1980s. His father worked as a carpenter and his mother worked as a nurse. Palczewski grew up speaking Polish, and was still learning English pronunciations through the third grade. Before football, he played soccer as a goalie. Palczewski competed in amateur wrestling throughout the course of his time in high school. He also spent two years each in water polo and track and field. In his junior year at Prospect, Palczewski received his first scholarship offer made by the Virginia Military Institute. Rated a three-star athlete, Palczewski received interest from North Carolina, North Carolina State, Minnesota, Michigan State and Indiana. He received offers from Syracuse, Vanderbilt and Illinois. Sports writers suggested Palczewski's recruitment potential might have been negatively effected by his absence from his junior season due to a neck injury including a fractured vertebrae.

== College career ==
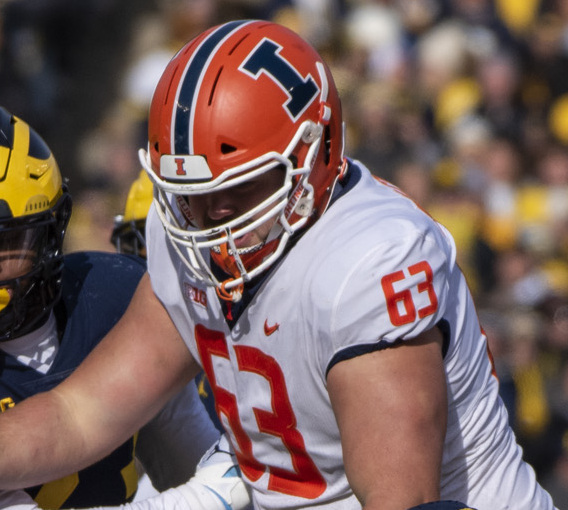
Palczewski with the Illinois Fighting Illini in 2022

Choosing loyalty to his home state, Palczewski committed to Illinois. He began his first season in 2017. After missing the opening game, Palczewski joined Vederian Lowe and Larry Boyd in making college history as Illinois' first-ever true freshmen starters on the offensive line. He played as a starting guard in the last 11 games of the season. In the 2018 season, Palczewski played as a starting right tackle for all 12 games. During his sophomore season, Palczewski was named to the All-Big Ten first team. He continued in this role for his junior season in 2019, starting in all 13 games. During the 2020 season as a senior, Palczewski played as starting right tackle for four games before missing the season's final four games due to injury. Despite this, he earned Big Ten third team honors.

During the 2021 season, Palczewski played seven games as a starting tackle and five games as a starting guard. After playing in all 12 games, he earned Big Ten third team honors. For his final senior season in 2022, he returned to his starting right tackle position and played in all 13 games. For his performances, Palczewski collected numerous All-American and Big Ten honors including being named to first, second and third teams. He also served as team captain for the season. Palczewski graduated with a bachelor's degree in kinesiology in 2021.

== Professional career ==
Pre-draft measurables
Height	Weight	Arm length	Hand span	Wingspan	40-yard dash	10-yard split	20-yard split	20-yard shuttle	Three-cone drill	Vertical jump	Broad jump	Bench press
6 ft 6 1/2 in (1.99 m)	303 lb (137 kg)	33 5/8 in (0.85 m)	9 1/4 in (0.23 m)	6 ft 9 1/2 in (2.07 m)	5.28 s	1.75 s	3.00 s	4.57 s	7.74 s	28.5 in (0.72 m)	8 ft 7 in (2.62 m)	22 reps
All values from Pro Day

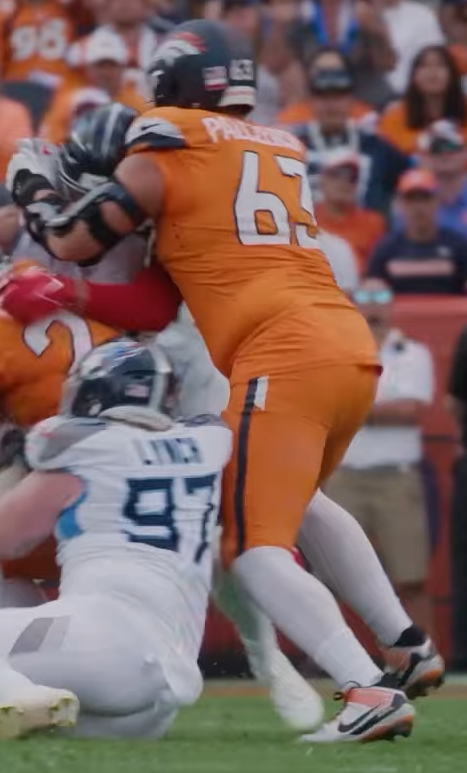
Palczewski with the Broncos in 2025

On February 21, 2023, Palczewski was drafted 68th overall by the New Orleans Breakers in the 2023 USFL draft, though he never signed with them.

Palczewski was signed by the Denver Broncos as an undrafted free agent on May 12, 2023. He was placed on injured reserve on August 31, 2023. He was activated on January 6, 2024.

Palczewski made his first start in Week 3 of the 2024 season, taking over for an injured Mike McGlinchey. It was reported on October 7, 2024, that Palczewski had suffered a high-ankle sprain during the Week 5 win over the Las Vegas Raiders.

During the 2025 season, Broncos fans started to cheer every time Palczewski was reported as an eligible receiver when lining up as the jumbo set tight end for rushing plays. He primarily played as the backup right tackle until Week 7, when left guards Ben Powers and Matt Peart were on injured reserve and Palczewski started at the position despite never having played it before.

On March 5, 2026, the Broncos signed Palczewski to a two-year, $9.5 million contract extension instead of placing an RFA tender on him.

== Personal life ==
Palczewski has two brothers. Throughout his college and NFL careers, he has gone by the nickname "Palcho" due to his Polish surname being difficult for his teammates and coaches to pronounce. During his Illinois senior season in 2021 Palczewski co-presided over Lift for Life, a local charity group whose cause is to raise money and awareness for people battling rare diseases. Palczewski named Ivan Drago as his favorite athlete, acknowledging while Drago is fictional, he admired Drago's decision not to express himself through words but through his athletic talent and work ethic.
