= Faion Hicks =

American football player (born 1998)

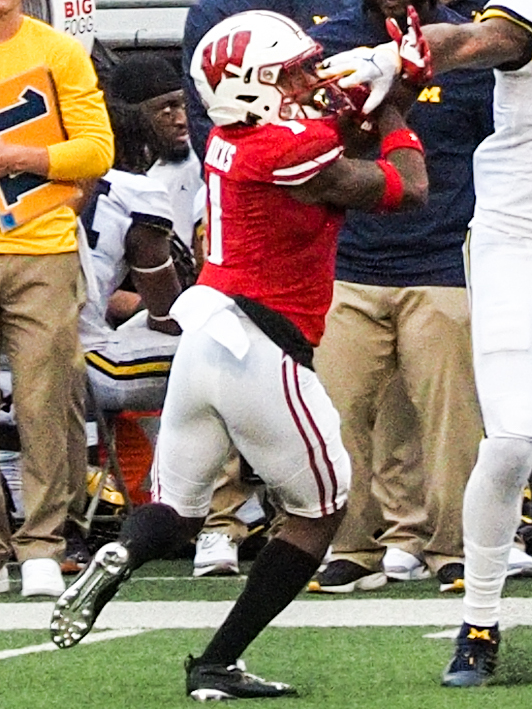
- Hicks with the Wisconsin Badgers in 2019

Montreal Alouettes
- Position: Cornerback
- Roster status: Practice roster
- CFL status: American

Personal information
- Born: September 2, 1997 (age 29); Pembroke Pines, Florida, U.S.
- Listed height: 5 ft 10 in (1.78 m)
- Listed weight: 192 lb (87 kg)

Career information
- High school: Charles W. Flanagan (Pembroke Pines)
- College: Wisconsin (2017–2021)
- NFL draft: 2022: 7th round, 232nd overall pick

Career history
- Denver Broncos (2022); New Orleans Saints (2023)*; Cleveland Browns (2024)*; Seattle Seahawks (2024); Birmingham Stallions (2025); Montreal Alouettes (2026–present)
- * Offseason or practice squad member only

Career NFL statistics
- Total tackles: 2
- Stats at Pro Football Reference

Faion Hicks (born September 2, 1997) is an American professional football cornerback for the Montreal Alouettes of the Canadian Football League (CFL). He played college football at Wisconsin and was selected by the Denver Broncos in the seventh round of the 2022 NFL draft.

== College career ==
Being ranked as a three-star recruit coming out of high school by 247Sports and Rivals.com, Hicks received 10 offers including Appalachian State, Iowa State and Wisconsin, committing to the Badgers in late 2016 and starting his college career in 2017.

== Professional career ==
Pre-draft measurables
Height	Weight	Arm length	Hand span	40-yard dash	10-yard split	20-yard split	20-yard shuttle	Three-cone drill	Vertical jump	Broad jump	Bench press
5 ft 10 in (1.78 m)	192 lb (87 kg)	30 5/8 in (0.78 m)	9 5/8 in (0.24 m)	4.49 s	1.49 s	2.60 s	4.21 s	6.90 s	37.5 in (0.95 m)	10 ft 3 in (3.12 m)	13 reps
All values from Pro Day

=== Denver Broncos ===
Hicks was selected by the Denver Broncos in the seventh round, 232nd overall, of the 2022 NFL draft. He was waived on August 30, 2022, and signed to the practice squad the next day. He signed a reserve/future contract on January 9, 2023.

On August 29, 2023, Hicks was waived by the Broncos.

=== New Orleans Saints ===
On September 13, 2023, Hicks was signed to the New Orleans Saints practice squad. Following the end of the 2023 regular season, the Saints signed him to a reserve/future contract on January 8, 2024. He was waived on June 17.

=== Cleveland Browns ===
On August 4, 2024, Hicks signed with the Cleveland Browns. He was waived on August 26.

=== Seattle Seahawks ===
On August 30, 2024, the Seattle Seahawks signed Hicks to their practice squad. He was released on November 26.

=== Birmingham Stallions ===
On March 15, 2025, Hicks signed with the Birmingham Stallions of the United Football League (UFL). He was released on May 20.

=== Montreal Alouettes ===
On December 8, 2025, Hicks signed with the Montreal Alouettes of the Canadian Football League (CFL). He was released by the Alouettes on May 30, 2026. On June 24, Hicks was re-signed by the team.
