= Leo Chenal =

American football player (born 2000)

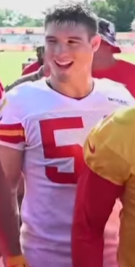
- Chenal with the Kansas City Chiefs in 2022

No. 54 – Washington Commanders
- Position: Linebacker
- Roster status: Injured reserve

Personal information
- Born: October 26, 2000 (age 26); Grantsburg, Wisconsin, U.S.
- Listed height: 6 ft 3 in (1.91 m)
- Listed weight: 250 lb (113 kg)

Career information
- High school: Grantsburg
- College: Wisconsin (2019–2021)
- NFL draft: 2022: 3rd round, 103rd overall pick

Career history
- Kansas City Chiefs (2022–2025); Washington Commanders (2026−present)

Awards and highlights
- 2× Super Bowl champion (LVII, LVIII); First-team All-American (2021); Big Ten Linebacker of the Year (2021)

Career NFL statistics as of 2026
- Tackles: 236
- Sacks: 7
- Forced fumbles: 3
- Pass deflections: 6
- Interceptions: 1
- Stats at Pro Football Reference

Leo Chenal (/ʃəˈnɛl/ shə-NEL; born October 26, 2000) is an American professional football linebacker for the Washington Commanders of the National Football League (NFL). He played college football for the Wisconsin Badgers and was selected by the Kansas City Chiefs in the third round of the 2022 NFL draft, where he won Super Bowl LVII and LVIII.

== Early life ==
Chenal grew up in West Sweden, Wisconsin township and attended school in the Frederic, Wisconsin district. He open enrolled as a freshman to nearby town Grantsburg, Wisconsin to attend Grantsburg High School, where he played both running back and linebacker. As a senior, Chenal rushed for 2,038 yards and 42 touchdowns with 226 receiving yards and three touchdowns on offense and had 120 tackles and seven tackles for loss on defense. He was named both the small-school Offensive and Defensive Player of the Year by Wisconsin Football Coaches Association and the state Gatorade Football Player of the Year. After a devastating loss to the future state champions, Iola-Scandinavia. Chenal finished his high school career with 3,706 rushing yards and 68 touchdowns and 1,300 receiving yards and 17 touchdown receptions on offense and with 385 tackles, 55 tackles for loss, seven sacks, and three interceptions on defense.

== College career ==
Chenal joined the Wisconsin Badgers as an early enrollee. He played in 11 games during his freshman season and had 20 tackles with two tackles for loss and one sack. As a sophomore, he was named honorable mention All-Big Ten Conference after finishing the season with 46 tackles, six tackles for loss, 3.0 sacks, one forced fumble and one interception in seven games during Wisconsin's COVID-19-shortened 2020 season. Chenal was named the Butkus–Fitzgerald Linebacker of the Year and first-team All-Big Ten as a junior.

On January 3, 2022, Chenal announced that he would forgo his senior year to enter the 2022 NFL draft.

== Professional career ==
Pre-draft measurables
Height	Weight	Arm length	Hand span	Wingspan	40-yard dash	10-yard split	20-yard split	20-yard shuttle	Three-cone drill	Vertical jump	Broad jump	Bench press
6 ft 2 5/8 in (1.90 m)	250 lb (113 kg)	31 in (0.79 m)	9 3/4 in (0.25 m)	6 ft 3 1/2 in (1.92 m)	4.53 s	1.50 s	2.57 s	4.24 s	6.98 s	40.5 in (1.03 m)	10 ft 8 in (3.25 m)	34 reps
All values from NFL Combine/Pro Day

=== Kansas City Chiefs ===
Chenal was selected in the third round (103rd overall) by the Kansas City Chiefs in the 2022 NFL draft. Chenal made his NFL debut in the Chiefs' regular season opener against the Arizona Cardinals. He earned his first start in Week 5 against the Las Vegas Raiders. He recorded his first professional sack in Week 10 against the Jacksonville Jaguars. Chenal finished his rookie season with 35 total tackles and one sack in 17 games, of which he started eight. Chenal won two Super Bowls, in his first two seasons with the Kansas City Chiefs. In Super Bowl LVII Chenal recorded six tackles and a sack as the Chiefs won 38–35 over the Philadelphia Eagles. He was also a key factor for the Chiefs in Super Bowl LVIII, contributing 6 tackles, 1 tackle for loss, 1 forced fumble, and a blocked extra point, helping the Chiefs win 25–22 in overtime over the San Francisco 49ers. In Week 10 of the 2024 season, Chenal blocked the potential walk-off field goal from Denver Broncos kicker Wil Lutz, leading to him being named AFC Special Teams Player of the Week.

Chenal made 14 appearances (12 starts) for Kansas City during the 2025 season, recording one interception, two pass deflections, two sacks, and 58 combined tackles. After suffering a shoulder injury in Week 15 against the Los Angeles Chargers, Chenal was placed on season-ending injured reserve on December 20, 2025.

=== Washington Commanders ===
On March 13, 2026, Chenal signed a three-year, $24.75 million contract with the Washington Commanders. In the second quarter of the Week 3 game against the Seattle Seahawks, Chenal was carted off the field due to a neck injury. The next day, the Commanders announced that he underwent surgery on his neck and would be out for the remainder of the 2026 season. On September 29, 2026, he was placed on injured reserve.

== NFL career statistics ==
Legend
	Won the Super Bowl
	Led the league
**Bold**	Career high

=== Regular season ===
Year	Team	Games		Tackles					Interceptions						Fumbles				
Year	Team	GP	GS	Cmb	Solo	Ast	Sck	TFL	Int	Yds	Avg	Lng	TD	PD	FF	Fmb	FR	Yds	TD
2022	KC	17	8	35	19	16	1.0	3	0	0	0.0	0	0	0	0	0	0	0	0
2023	KC	17	10	**65**	**40**	25	**3.0**	**8**	0	0	0.0	0	0	1	0	0	0	0	0
2024	KC	17	14	60	**40**	20	1.0	4	0	0	0.0	0	0	**3**	**3**	0	0	0	0
2025	KC	14	12	58	25	**33**	2.0	2	**1**	0	0.0	0	0	2	0	0	0	0	0
2026	WAS	3	2	18	9	9	0.0	1	0	0	0.0	0	0	0	0	0	0	0	0
Career		68	46	236	133	103	7.0	18	1	0	0.0	0	0	6	3	0	0	0	0

=== Postseason ===
Year	Team	Games		Tackles					Interceptions						Fumbles				
Year	Team	GP	GS	Cmb	Solo	Ast	Sck	TFL	Int	Yds	Avg	Lng	TD	PD	FF	Fmb	FR	Yds	TD
2022	KC	3	0	6	4	2	**1.0**	**1**	0	0	0.0	0	0	0	0	0	0	0	0
2023	KC	4	3	**15**	**8**	**7**	0.0	**1**	0	0	0.0	0	0	0	**1**	0	0	0	0
2024	KC	3	2	10	7	3	0.0	**1**	0	0	0.0	0	0	0	0	0	0	0	0
Career		10	5	31	19	12	1.0	3	0	0	0.0	0	0	0	1	0	0	0	0

== Personal life ==
Chenal has seven brothers and eight sisters. Out of his fifteen siblings, eight of them are full and seven of them are half siblings. Chenal married his college girlfriend, Ashley Luczak, in June 2021.
