= Vederian Lowe =

American football player (born 1999)

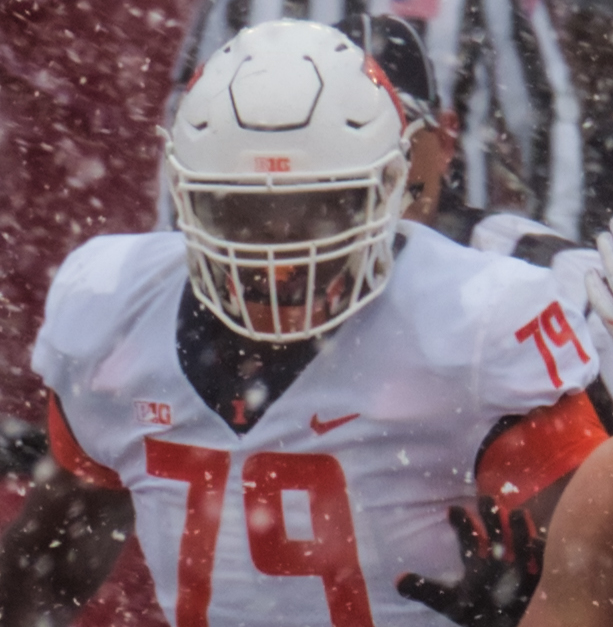
- Lowe with the Illinois Fighting Illini in 2018

No. 76 – San Francisco 49ers
- Position: Offensive tackle
- Roster status: Active

Personal information
- Born: April 17, 1999 (age 27); Rockford, Illinois, U.S.
- Listed height: 6 ft 5 in (1.96 m)
- Listed weight: 315 lb (143 kg)

Career information
- High school: Auburn (Rockford)
- College: Illinois (2017–2021)
- NFL draft: 2022: 6th round, 184th overall pick

Career history
- Minnesota Vikings (2022); New England Patriots (2023–2025); San Francisco 49ers (2026–present)

Career NFL statistics as of Week 7, 2026
- Games played: 53
- Games started: 25
- Stats at Pro Football Reference

Vederian Lowe (born April 17, 1999) is an American professional football offensive tackle for the San Francisco 49ers of the National Football League (NFL). He played college football for the Illinois Fighting Illini.

== Professional career ==
Pre-draft measurables
Height	Weight	Arm length	Hand span	Wingspan	40-yard dash	10-yard split	20-yard split	20-yard shuttle	Three-cone drill	Vertical jump	Broad jump	Bench press
6 ft 4 5/8 in (1.95 m)	314 lb (142 kg)	35 3/8 in (0.90 m)	10 3/8 in (0.26 m)	6 ft 11 7/8 in (2.13 m)	5.22 s	1.75 s	2.99 s	4.71 s	7.83 s	25.5 in (0.65 m)	8 ft 3 in (2.51 m)	22 reps
All values from NFL Combine/Pro Day

=== Minnesota Vikings ===
Lowe was selected by the Minnesota Vikings in the sixth round, 184th overall, of the 2022 NFL draft. As a rookie, he appeared in four games.

=== New England Patriots ===
Lowe was traded to the New England Patriots on August 28, 2023, in exchange for a sixth-round pick in the 2024 NFL draft. Following an injury to Trent Brown, Lowe made his first career start at left tackle for the Week 2 Sunday Night Football game against the Miami Dolphins. In the 2023 season, Lowe appeared in eleven games.

In the Patriots' 2024 Week 11 loss to the Los Angeles Rams, Lowe lined up as an eligible receiver and caught his first NFL touchdown, a 4-yard pass, from quarterback Drake Maye. In the 2024 season, Lowe appeared in 14 games.

=== San Francisco 49ers ===
On March 12, 2026, Lowe signed a two-year, $12 million contract with the San Francisco 49ers.
