= 2022 Ohio State Buckeyes football team =

American college football season

2022 Ohio State Buckeyes football

Peach Bowl (CFP Semifinal), L 41–42 vs. Georgia
- Conference: Big Ten Conference
- East Division

Ranking
- Coaches: No. 4
- AP: No. 4
- Record: 11–2 (8–1 Big Ten)
- Head coach: Ryan Day (4th season)
- Offensive coordinator: Kevin Wilson (6th season)
- Offensive scheme: West Coast spread
- Defensive coordinator: Jim Knowles (1st season)
- Base defense: 4–2–5
- MVP: Marvin Harrison Jr.
- Captains: Kamryn Babb; Tommy Eichenberg; Tyler Friday; Teradja Mitchell; Cade Stover; C. J. Stroud; Kourt Williams
- Home stadium: Ohio Stadium

2022 Big Ten Conference football standings
	Conf.			Overall
Team	W		L	W		L
East Division
No. 3 Michigan xy$^	9	–	0	13	–	1
No. 4 Ohio State ^	8	–	1	11	–	2
No. 7 Penn State	7	–	2	11	–	2
Maryland	4	–	5	8	–	5
Indiana	2	–	7	4	–	8
Rutgers	1	–	8	4	–	8
Michigan State†	0	–	6	0	–	7
West Division
Purdue xy	6	–	3	8	–	6
Illinois	5	–	4	8	–	5
Iowa	5	–	4	8	–	5
Minnesota	5	–	4	9	–	4
Wisconsin	4	–	5	7	–	6
Nebraska	3	–	6	4	–	8
Northwestern	1	–	8	1	–	11
Championship: Michigan 43, Purdue 22
^ – College Football Playoff participant; $ – Conference champion; x – Division champion/co-champions; y – Championship game participant; † — NCAA vacated all wins for Michigan State (5–7, 3–6); Rankings from AP Poll

The 2022 Ohio State Buckeyes football team represented Ohio State University as a member of the East Division of the Big Ten Conference during the 2022 NCAA Division I FBS football season. Led by fourth-year head coach Ryan Day, the Buckeyes played their home games at Ohio Stadium in Columbus, Ohio. It was the Buckeyes' 133rd season overall and 110th as a member of the Big Ten.

On November 26, No. 2 Ohio State faced their biggest rival, the No. 3 Michigan Wolverines, in a matchup of two undefeated teams, and lost for the second consecutive time by a score of 45–23. However, Buckeyes were ranked No. 4 in the CFP Poll after the then-No. 4 USC Trojans were blown out by the Utah Utes, and were matched up against the defending and eventual repeat national champions, the Georgia Bulldogs in the 2022 Peach Bowl, one of the two College Football Playoff games. The Buckeyes lost the Peach Bowl by a score of 42–41 after Noah Ruggles missed a 50-yard field goal attempt on their final offensive play of the game.

== Offseason ==
=== Coaching staff changes ===
==== Coaching staff departures ====
Name	Position	Following Team	Following Position
Kerry Coombs	Defensive coordinator	Cincinnati	Cornerbacks coach / special teams coordinator
Al Washington	Linebackers coach	Notre Dame	Defensive line coach / defensive run game coordinator
Matt Barnes	Secondary Coach	Memphis	Defensive coordinator
Greg Studrawa	Offensive line coach	—	—

==== Coaching staff additions ====
Name	Position	Previous Team	Previous Position
Justin Frye	Associate head coach for offense / offensive line coach	UCLA	Offensive coordinator / offensive line coach
Jim Knowles	Defensive coordinator / linebackers coach	Oklahoma State	Defensive coordinator
Tim Walton	Secondary Coach / Cornerbacks coach	Jacksonville Jaguars (NFL)	Cornerbacks coach
Perry Eliano	Safeties coach	Cincinnati	Cornerbacks coach

=== Transfers ===
==== Transfers out ====
The Buckeyes lost 20 players to the transfer portal.

Name	Number	Pos.	Height	Weight	Year	Hometown	Transfer to
Dallas Gant	#19	LB	6’3	235	Senior	Toledo, Ohio	Toledo
K'Vaughan Pope	#36	LB	6’1	225	Senior	Dinwiddie, Virginia	Tennessee State
Jack Miller III	#9	QB	6’3	215	(redshirt) Freshman	Scottsdale, Arizona	Florida
Quinn Ewers	#3	QB	6’2	200	Freshman	Southlake, Texas	Texas
Craig Young	#15	SAF	6'3	223	Sophomore	Fort Wayne, Indiana	Kansas
Jagger LaRoe	#19	QB	6'3	225	Senior	Colleyville, Texas	Texas A&M–Commerce
Ryan Watts	#16	CB	6'3	205	(redshirt) Freshman	Little Elm, Texas	Texas
Darrion Henry-Young	#59	DL	6’4	265	(redshirt) Freshman	Cincinnati, Ohio	Kentucky
J.P. Andrade	#18	QB	6’2	210	Junior	La Verne, California	Jackson State
Sevyn Banks	#7	CB	6’1	200	Senior	Orlando, Florida	LSU
Cormontae Hamilton	#83	DL	6’2	265	Sophomore	Memphis, Tennessee	Memphis
Lejond Cavazos	#4	CB	6'0	192	Sophomore	San Antonio, Texas	North Carolina
Bryson Shaw	#17	SAF	6'0	195	Junior	Eldersburg, Maryland	USC
Jacolbe Cowan	#93	DL	6'4	272	Sophomore	Charlotte, North Carolina	North Carolina
Andre Turrentine	#34	SAF	5’11	195	(redshirt) Freshman	Nashville, Tennessee	Tennessee
Marcus Hooker	#23	SAF	5'11	200	Senior	New Castle, Pennsylvania	Youngstown State
Noah Potter	#97	DL	6’6	275	Junior	Mentor, Ohio	Cincinnati
Sam Wiglusz	#82	WR	5’11	189	Senior	Brecksville, Ohio	Ohio

==== Transfers in ====
The Buckeyes added three players via transfer.

Name	Number	Pos.	Height	Weight	Year	Hometown	Transfer from
DeaMonte "Chip" Trayanum	#19	RB/LB	5’11	227	Junior	Akron, Ohio	Arizona State
Parker Lewis	-	K	6’3	220	Junior	Scottsdale, Arizona	USC
Tanner McCalister	#15	SAF	5’11	192	Graduate	Rockwall, Texas	Oklahoma State

=== Players drafted into the NFL ===
Round	Pick	NFL team	Player	Position
1	10	New York Jets	Garrett Wilson	WR
1	11	New Orleans Saints	Chris Olave	WR
3	69	Tennessee Titans	Nicholas Petit-Frere	OT
3	101	New York Jets	Jeremy Ruckert	TE
5	158	Seattle Seahawks	Tyreke Smith	DE
7	238	Las Vegas Raiders	Thayer Munford	OT

== Preseason ==
=== Spring Game ===
The 2022 Spring Game was held at Ohio Stadium on Saturday, April 16, 2022, where the Scarlet team (offense) defeated the Gray team (defense), 34–26.

Date	Time	Spring Game	Site	TV	Result	Attendance
April 16	12:00 pm	Scarlet vs. Gray	Ohio Stadium • Columbus, OH	BTN	Scarlet 34–26	60,007

== Schedule ==
Date	Time	Opponent	Rank	Site	TV	Result	Attendance
September 3	7:30 p.m.	No. 5 Notre Dame*	No. 2	Ohio Stadium; Columbus, OH (College GameDay)	ABC	W 21–10	106,594
September 10	12:00 p.m.	Arkansas State*	No. 3	Ohio Stadium; Columbus, OH	BTN	W 45–12	100,067
September 17	7:00 p.m.	Toledo*	No. 3	Ohio Stadium; Columbus, OH	FOX	W 77–21	105,398
September 24	7:30 p.m.	Wisconsin	No. 3	Ohio Stadium; Columbus, OH	ABC	W 52–21	105,473
October 1	3:30 p.m.	Rutgers^{†}	No. 3	Ohio Stadium; Columbus, OH	BTN	W 49–10	104,245
October 8	4:00 p.m.	at Michigan State	No. 3	Spartan Stadium; East Lansing, MI	ABC	W 49–20	72,809
October 22	12:00 p.m.	Iowa	No. 2	Ohio Stadium; Columbus, OH (Big Noon Kickoff)	FOX	W 54–10	104,848
October 29	12:00 p.m.	at No. 13 Penn State	No. 2	Beaver Stadium; University Park, PA (rivalry, Big Noon Kickoff)	FOX	W 44–31	108,433
November 5	12:00 p.m.	at Northwestern	No. 2	Ryan Field; Evanston, IL	ABC	W 21–7	42,774
November 12	12:00 p.m.	Indiana	No. 2	Ohio Stadium; Columbus, OH (Big Noon Kickoff)	FOX	W 56–14	103,888
November 19	3:30 p.m.	at Maryland	No. 2	SECU Stadium; College Park, MD	ABC	W 43–30	41,969
November 26	12:00 p.m.	No. 3 Michigan	No. 2	Ohio Stadium; Columbus, OH (rivalry, Big Noon Kickoff, College GameDay)	FOX	L 23–45	106,787
December 31	8:00 p.m.	vs. No. 1 Georgia*	No. 4	Mercedes-Benz Stadium; Atlanta, GA (Peach Bowl–CFP Semifinal)	ESPN	L 41–42	79,330
*Non-conference game; ^{†}Homecoming; Rankings from AP Poll and CFP Rankings (after November 1) released prior to game; All times are in Eastern time

== Game summaries ==
=== vs No. 5 Notre Dame ===
No. 5 Notre Dame Fighting Irish (0–0) vs No. 2 Ohio State Buckeyes (0–0) – Game summary

Quarter	1	2	3	4	Total
No. 5 Fighting Irish	3	7	0	0	10
No. 2 Buckeyes	7	0	7	7	21

at Ohio Stadium •Columbus, Ohio

- Date: September 3
- Game time: 7:30 p.m.
- Game weather: Cloudy, 80 °F (27 °C)
- Game attendance: 106,594
- Referee: Jeff Heaser
- TV announcers (ABC): Chris Fowler (play-by-play), Kirk Herbstreit (analyst), and Holly Rowe (sideline reporter)
- Box score, Recap

Game information

First quarter

- (12:13) ND – Blake Grupe 35-yard field goal (Drive: 5 plays, 71 yards, 2:37; Notre Dame 3–0)
- (5:32) OSU – Emeka Egbuka 31-yard pass from C. J. Stroud, Noah Ruggles kick (Drive: 4 plays, 54 yards, 1:34; Ohio State 7–3)

Second quarter

- (11:56) ND – Audric Estimé 1-yard run, Blake Grupe kick (Drive: 10 plays, 87 yards, 5:10; Notre Dame 10–7)

Third quarter

- (0:17) OSU – Xavier Johnson 24-yard pass from C. J. Stroud, Noah Ruggles kick (Drive: 10 plays, 70 yards, 4:43; Ohio State 14–10)

Fourth quarter

- (4:51) OSU – Miyan Williams 2-yard run, Noah Ruggles kick (Drive: 14 plays, 95 yards, 7:06; Ohio State 21–10)

Statistics	ND	OSU
First downs	12	22
Plays–yards	48–253	69–395
Rushes–yards	30–76	35–172
Passing yards	177	223
Passing: comp–att–int	10–18–0	24–34–0
Time of possession	27:01	32:59

Team	Category	Player	Statistics
Notre Dame	Passing	Tyler Buchner	10/18, 177 yards
Notre Dame	Rushing	Chris Tyree	6 carries, 28 yards
Notre Dame	Receiving	Lorenzo Styles Jr.	1 reception, 54 yards
Ohio State	Passing	C. J. Stroud	24/34, 223 yards, 2 TD
Ohio State	Rushing	TreVeyon Henderson	15 carries, 91 yards
Ohio State	Receiving	Emeka Egbuka	9 receptions, 90 yards, 1 TD

=== vs Arkansas State ===
Arkansas State Red Wolves (1–0) vs No. 3 Ohio State Buckeyes (1–0) – Game summary

Quarter	1	2	3	4	Total
Red Wolves	3	6	3	0	12
No. 3 Buckeyes	14	10	21	0	45

at Ohio Stadium • Columbus, Ohio

- Date: September 10
- Game time: 12:00 p.m.
- Game weather: Cloudy, 75 °F (24 °C)
- Game attendance: 100,067
- Referee: David Siegle
- TV announcers (BTN): Mark Followill (play-by-play), Joshua Perry (analyst), and Michelle McMahon (sideline reporter)
- Box score, Recap

Game information

First quarter

- (10:04) OSU – Marvin Harrison Jr. 42-yard pass from C. J. Stroud, Noah Ruggles kick (Drive: 8 plays, 96 yards, 3:30; Ohio State 7–0)
- (5:56) ARST – Dominic Zvada 30-yard field goal (Drive: 11 plays, 56 yards, 4:03; Ohio State 7–3)
- (4:23) OSU – TreVeyon Henderson 4-yard run, Noah Ruggles kick (Drive: 4 plays, 75 yards, 1:33; Ohio State 14–3)

Second quarter

- (14:56) OSU – Noah Ruggles 24-yard field goal (Drive: 8 plays, 71 yards, 2:51; Ohio State 17–3)
- (13:33) ARST – Dominic Zvada 38-yard field goal (Drive: 5 plays, 50 yards, 1:15; Ohio State 17–6)
- (5:22) ARST – Dominic Zvada 34-yard field goal (Drive: 14 plays, 58 yards, 6:53; Ohio State 17–9)
- (4:24) OSU – Marvin Harrison Jr. 42-yard pass from C. J. Stroud, Noah Ruggles kick (Drive: 3 plays, 75 yards, 0:58; Ohio State 24–9)

Third quarter

- (13:40) OSU – TreVeyon Henderson 23-yard run, Noah Ruggles kick (Drive: 3 plays, 75 yards, 1:20; Ohio State 31–9)
- (10:30) OSU – Emeka Egbuka 51-yard pass from C. J. Stroud, Noah Ruggles kick (Drive: 2 plays, 59 yards, 0:42; Ohio State 38–9)
- (2:49) ARST – Dominic Zvada 45-yard field goal (Drive: 10 plays, 43 yards, 4:46; Ohio State 38–12)
- (0:04) OSU – Marvin Harrison Jr. 30-yard pass from C. J. Stroud, Noah Ruggles kick (Drive: 7 plays, 75 yards, 2:45; Ohio State 45–12)

Fourth quarter

- No scoring plays

Statistics	ARST	OSU
First downs	15	20
Plays–yards	76–276	54–538
Rushes–yards	34–53	26–168
Passing yards	223	370
Passing: comp–att–int	25–42–0	19–28–0
Time of possession	37:44	22:16

Team	Category	Player	Statistics
Arkansas State	Passing	James Blackman	20/34, 188 yards
Arkansas State	Rushing	Champ Flemings	2 carries, 20 yards
Arkansas State	Receiving	Champ Flemings	10 reception, 105 yards
Ohio State	Passing	C. J. Stroud	16/24, 351 yards, 4 TD
Ohio State	Rushing	TreVeyon Henderson	10 carries, 87 yards, 2 TD
Ohio State	Receiving	Marvin Harrison Jr.	7 receptions, 184 yards, 3 TD

=== vs Toledo ===
Toledo Rockets (2–0) vs No. 3 Ohio State Buckeyes (2–0) – Game summary

Quarter	1	2	3	4	Total
Rockets	7	7	7	0	21
No. 3 Buckeyes	28	14	14	21	77

at Ohio Stadium • Columbus, Ohio

- Date: September 17
- Game time: 7:00 p.m.
- Game weather: Clear, 80 °F (27 °C)
- Game attendance: 105,398
- Referee: Greg Blum
- TV announcers (FOX): Tim Brando (play-by-play) and Spencer Tillman (analyst)
- Box score, Recap

Game information

First quarter

- (11:11) OSU – TreVeyon Henderson 7-yard run, Noah Ruggles kick (Drive: 8 plays, 82 yards, 3:45; Ohio State 7–0)
- (10:25) TOL – Thomas Zsiros 50-yard pass from Dequan Finn, Thomas Cluckey kick (Drive: 4 plays, 75 yards, 0:46; Tied 7–7)
- (7:52) OSU – Marvin Harrison Jr. 8-yard pass from C. J. Stroud, Noah Ruggles kick (Drive: 6 plays, 75 yards, 2:33; Ohio State 14–7)
- (4:29) OSU – Emeka Egbuka 3-yard run, Noah Ruggles kick (Drive: 5 plays, 59 yards, 1:59; Ohio State 21–7)
- (0:10) OSU – Julian Fleming 5-yard pass from C. J. Stroud, Noah Ruggles kick (Drive: 7 plays, 71 yards, 2:58; Ohio State 28–7)

Second quarter

- (10:41) TOL – Dequan Finn 23-yard run, Thomas Cluckey kick (Drive: 11 plays, 75 yards, 4:29; Ohio State 28–14)
- (7:16) OSU – Marvin Harrison Jr. 7-yard pass from C. J. Stroud, Noah Ruggles kick (Drive: 7 plays, 75 yards, 3:25; Ohio State 35–14)
- (0:47) OSU – Julian Fleming 11-yard pass from C. J. Stroud, Noah Ruggles kick (Drive: 9 plays, 89 yards, 4:37; Ohio State 42–14)

Third quarter

- (13:08) OSU – Mitch Rossi 1-yard run, Noah Ruggles kick (Drive: 4 plays, 48 yards, 1:24; Ohio State 49–14)
- (10:23) TOL – Jerjuan Newton 40-yard pass from Dequan Finn, Thomas Cluckey kick (Drive: 6 plays, 75 yards, 2:45; Ohio State 49–21)
- (5:06) OSU – Emeka Egbuka 7-yard pass from C. J. Stroud, Noah Ruggles kick (Drive: 4 plays, 39 yards, 1:30; Ohio State 56–21)

Fourth quarter

- (13:49) OSU – Dallan Hayden 1-yard run, Noah Ruggles kick (Drive: 11 plays, 68 yards, 4:59; Ohio State 63–21)
- (11:45) OSU – Jayden Ballard 72-yard pass from Kyle McCord, Noah Ruggles kick (Drive: 2 plays, 74 yards, 0:43; Ohio State 70–21)
- (7:08) OSU – TC Caffey 49-yard run, Noah Ruggles kick (Drive: 3 plays, 45 yards, 1:35; Ohio State 77–21)

Statistics	TOL	OSU
First downs	13	36
Plays–yards	56–307	78–763
Rushes–yards	33–124	44–281
Passing yards	183	482
Passing: comp–att–int	12–23–1	27–34–0
Time of possession	24:34	35:26

Team	Category	Player	Statistics
Toledo	Passing	Dequan Finn	10/19, 153 yards, 2 TD, 1 INT
Toledo	Rushing	Dequan Finn	7 carries, 70 yards, 1 TD
Toledo	Receiving	Thomas Zsiros	1 reception, 50 yards, 1 TD
Ohio State	Passing	C. J. Stroud	22/27, 367 yards, 5 TD
Ohio State	Rushing	Dallan Hayden	17 carries, 108 yards, 1 TD
Ohio State	Receiving	Emeka Egbuka	7 receptions, 116 yards, 1 TD

=== vs Wisconsin ===
Wisconsin Badgers (2–1) vs No. 3 Ohio State Buckeyes (3–0) – Game summary

Quarter	1	2	3	4	Total
Badgers	0	7	0	14	21
No. 3 Buckeyes	21	10	14	7	52

at Ohio Stadium • Columbus, Ohio

- Date: September 24
- Game time: 7:30 p.m.
- Game weather: Clear, 66 °F (19 °C)
- Game attendance: 105,473
- Referee: Jerry McGinn
- TV announcers (ABC): Chris Fowler (play-by-play), Kirk Herbstreit (analyst), and Holly Rowe (sideline reporter)
- Box score, Recap

Game information

First quarter

- (12:13) OSU – Miyan Williams 2-yard run, Noah Ruggles kick (Drive: 6 plays, 88 yards, 2:47; Ohio State 7–0)
- (8:54) OSU – Cade Stover 13-yard pass from C. J. Stroud, Noah Ruggles kick (Drive: 2 plays, 16 yards, 0:41; Ohio State 14–0)
- (3:55) OSU – Cade Stover 2-yard pass from C. J. Stroud, Noah Ruggles kick (Drive: 7 plays, 70 yards, 3:24; Ohio State 21–0)

Second quarter

- (13:33) OSU – Miyan Williams 3-yard run, Noah Ruggles kick (Drive: 8 plays, 67 yards, 3:21; Ohio State 28–0)
- (8:31) WIS – Graham Mertz 1-yard run, Nate Van Zelst kick (Drive: 10 plays, 72 yards, 5:02; Ohio State 28–7)
- (2:20) OSU – Noah Ruggles 25-yard field goal (Drive: 3 plays, 68 yards, 6:11; Ohio State 31–7)

Third quarter

- (9:35) OSU – Julian Fleming 12-yard pass from C. J. Stroud, Noah Ruggles kick (Drive: 8 plays, 72 yards, 3:38; Ohio State 38–7)
- (2:22) OSU – Emeka Egbuka 8-yard pass from C. J. Stroud, Noah Ruggles kick (Drive: 4 plays, 38 yards, 2:02; Ohio State 45–7)

Fourth quarter

- (9:46) WIS – Jackson Acker 2-yard pass from Graham Mertz, Nate Van Zelst kick (Drive: 14 plays, 80 yards, 7:36; Ohio State 45–14)
- (7:21) OSU – Emeka Egbuka 32-yard pass from C. J. Stroud, Noah Ruggles kick (Drive: 5 plays, 75 yards, 2:25; Ohio State 52–14)
- (7:11) WIS – Braelon Allen 75-yard run, Nate Van Zelst kick (Drive: 1 play, 75 yards, 0:10; Ohio State 52–21)

Statistics	WIS	OSU
First downs	11	28
Plays–yards	56–296	70–539
Rushes–yards	35–192	43–258
Passing yards	104	281
Passing: comp–att–int	12–21–1	17–27–1
Time of possession	26:58	33:02

Team	Category	Player	Statistics
Wisconsin	Passing	Graham Mertz	11/20, 94 yards, 1 TD, 1 INT
Wisconsin	Rushing	Braelon Allen	24 carries, 165 yards, 1 TD
Wisconsin	Receiving	Skyler Bell	4 reception, 55 yards
Ohio State	Passing	C. J. Stroud	17/27, 281 yards, 5 TD, 1 INT
Ohio State	Rushing	TreVeyon Henderson	21 carries, 121 yards
Ohio State	Receiving	Emeka Egbuka	6 receptions, 118 yards, 2 TD

=== vs Rutgers ===
Rutgers Scarlet Knights (3–1) vs No. 3 Ohio State Buckeyes (4–0) – Game summary

Quarter	1	2	3	4	Total
Scarlet Knights	7	0	3	0	10
No. 3 Buckeyes	14	14	14	7	49

at Ohio Stadium • Columbus, Ohio

- Date: October 1
- Game time: 3:30 p.m.
- Game weather: Cloudy, 65 °F (18 °C)
- Game attendance: 104,245
- Referee: Ron Snodgrass
- TV announcers (BTN): Brandon Gaudin (play-by-play), Joshua Perry (analyst), and Rick Pizzo (sideline reporter)
- Box score, Recap

Game information

First quarter

- (11:00) RUTG – Sean Ryan 14-yard pass from Evan Simon, Jude McAtamney kick (Drive: 3 plays, 18 yards, 1:33; Rutgers 7–0)
- (9:21) OSU – Miyan Williams 2-yard run, Noah Ruggles kick (Drive: 5 plays, 48 yards, 1:39; Tied 7–7)
- (4:05) OSU – Miyan Williams 1-yard run, Noah Ruggles kick (Drive: 9 plays, 74 yards, 3:29; Ohio State 14–7)

Second quarter

- (14:51) OSU – Julian Fleming 36-yard pass from C. J. Stroud, Noah Ruggles kick (Drive: 3 plays, 51 yards, 0:34; Ohio State 21–7)
- (0:48) OSU – Miyan Williams 1-yard run, Noah Ruggles kick (Drive: 10 plays, 39 yards, 4:48; Ohio State 28–7; Ohio State 28–7)

Third quarter

- (10:12) RUTG – Jude McAtamney 35-yard field goal (Drive: 8 plays, 42 yards, 4:36; Ohio State 28–10)
- (10:01) OSU – Miyan Williams 70-yard run, Noah Ruggles kick (Drive: 1 play, 75 yards, 0:11; Ohio State 35–10)
- (1:22) OSU – Marvin Harrison Jr. 4-yard pass from C. J. Stroud, Noah Ruggles kick (Drive: 8 plays, 55 yards, 4:04; Ohio State 42–10)

Fourth quarter

- (14:50) OSU – Miyan Williams 2-yard run, Noah Ruggles kick (Drive: 2 plays, 20 yards, 0:28; Ohio State 49–10)

Statistics	RUTG	OSU
First downs	12	24
Plays–yards	56–187	59–413
Rushes–yards	36–107	34–252
Passing yards	80	161
Passing: comp–att–int	11–20–1	15–25–1
Time of possession	33:05	26:55

Team	Category	Player	Statistics
Rutgers	Passing	Evan Simon	10/19, 74 yards, 1 TD, 1 INT
Rutgers	Rushing	Samuel Brown V	15 carries, 79 yards
Rutgers	Receiving	Sean Ryan	2 receptions, 40 yards, 1 TD
Ohio State	Passing	C. J. Stroud	13/22, 154 yards, 2 TD, 1 INT
Ohio State	Rushing	Miyan Williams	21 carries, 189 yards, 5 TD
Ohio State	Receiving	Emeka Egbuka	4 receptions, 70 yards

=== at Michigan State ===
No. 3 Ohio State Buckeyes (5-0) at Michigan State Spartans (2-3) – Game Summary

Quarter	1	2	3	4	Total
No. 3 Ohio State	14	21	14	0	49
Michigan State	7	6	0	7	20

at Spartan Stadium, East Lansing, Michigan

- Date: October 8
- Game time: 4:00 p.m. EDT
- Game weather: Sunny, 54 °F (12 °C)
- Game attendance: 72,809
- Referee: Michael Cannon
- TV announcers (ABC): Chris Fowler (play-by-play), Kirk Herbstreit (analyst), and Holly Rowe (sideline reporter)
- Spread: Ohio State –27 • Odds to win: Ohio State 88.5% •

Game information

First quarter

- 10:50 OSU – Marvin Harrison Jr. 19 yard pass from C. J. Stroud (Noah Ruggles kick) – Ohio State 7–0, Drive: 7 plays, 80 yards, 2:20
- 8:32 MSU – C. J. Stroud pass intercepted by Charles Brantley, returned 32 yds for a TD (Jack Stone kick) – Tied 7–7, Drive: 4 plays, 15 yards, 1:30
- 7:11 OSU – Emeka Egbuka 69 yard pass from C. J. Stroud (Noah Ruggles kick) – Ohio State 14–7, Drive: 3 plays, 75 yards, 1:21

Second quarter

- 14:29 OSU – Julian Fleming 51 yard pass from C. J. Stroud, (Noah Ruggles kick) – Ohio State 21–7, Drive: 8 plays, 98 yards, 2:44
- 10:43 MSU – Jayden Reed 18 yard pass from Payton Thorne (Jack Stone kick missed) – Ohio State 21–13, Drive: 7 plays, 76 yards, 3:46
- 7:05 OSU – TreVeyon Henderson 1 yard run, (Noah Ruggles kick) – Ohio State 28–13, Drive: 8 plays, 75 yards, 3:38
- 1:20 OSU – Marvin Harrison Jr. 28 yard pass from C. J. Stroud, (Noah Ruggles kick) – Ohio State 35–13, Drive: 9 plays, 91 yards, 4:36

Third quarter

- 9:46 OSU – Marvin Harrison Jr. 19 yard pass from C. J. Stroud, (Noah Ruggles kick) – Ohio State 42–13, Drive: 9 plays, 96 yards, 5:14
- 3:04 OSU – Gee Scott, Jr. 2 yard pass from C. J. Stroud, (Noah Ruggles kick) – Ohio State 49–13, Drive: 10 plays, 50 yards, 4:38

Fourth quarter

- 5:40 MSU – Montorie Foster 25 yard pass from Noah Kim, (Jack Stone kick) – Ohio State 49–20, Drive: 8 plays, 80 yards, 3:10

Statistics	No. 3 Ohio State	Michigan State
First downs	29	12
Plays–yards	74–614	48–202
Rushes–yards	46–237	20–7
Passing yards	377	195
Passing: comp–att–int	23–28–1	17–28–1
Turnovers		
Time of possession	37:14	22:46

Team	Category	Player	Statistics
No. 3 Ohio State	Passing	C. J. Stroud	21–26, 361 yards, 6 TD, 1 INT
No. 3 Ohio State	Rushing	TreVeyon Henderson	19 carries, 119 yards, 1 TD
No. 3 Ohio State	Receiving	Emeka Egbuka	5 receptions, 143 yards, 1 TD
Michigan State	Passing	Payton Thorne	11–18, 113 yards, 1 TD, 1 INT
Michigan State	Rushing	Elijah Collins	2 carries, 9 yards
Michigan State	Receiving	Jayden Reed	4 receptions, 67 yards, 1 TD

=== vs Iowa ===
No. 2 Ohio State Buckeyes (6-0) vs Iowa Hawkeyes (3-3) – Game summary

Quarter	1	2	3	4	Total
Iowa	7	3	0	0	10
No. 2 Ohio State	16	10	14	14	54

at Ohio Stadium, Columbus, Ohio

- Date: October 22
- Game time: 12:00 p.m. EDT
- Game weather: Mostly Sunny, 66 °F (19 °C)
- Game attendance: 104,848
- Referee: Jerry McGinn
- TV announcers (FOX): Gus Johnson (play-by-play), Joel Klatt (analyst), and Jenny Taft (sideline reporter)
- Spread: Ohio State –30 • Odds to win: Ohio State 95.4% •

Game information

First quarter

- 14:02 OSU - Noah Ruggles kicks a 46 yard field goal – Ohio State 3–0, Drive: 4 plays, 1 yard, 0:44
- 13:00 IOWA - Joe Evans recovers a fumble and returns it for a 11 yard TD (Drew Stevens kick) – Iowa 7–3, Drive: 1 play, -13 yards, 0:07
- 8:15 OSU - Miyan Williams runs for a 2 yard TD (Noah Ruggles kick) – Ohio State 10–7, Drive: 10 plays, 75 yards, 4:45
- 4:30 OSU - Noah Ruggles kicks a 41 yard field goal – Ohio State 13–7, Drive: 4 plays, 4 yards, 2:10
- 0:00 OSU - Noah Ruggles kicks a 35 yard field goal – Ohio State 16–7, Drive: 5 plays, 17 yards, 2:24

Second quarter

- 10:07 IOWA - Drew Stevens kicks a 49 yard field goal – Ohio State 16–10, Drive: 10 plays, 44 yards, 4:53
- 3:38 OSU - Noah Ruggles kicks a 26 yard field goal – Ohio State 19–10, Drive: 8 plays, 24 yards, 3:00
- 3:25 OSU - Spencer Petras pass intercepted by Tommy Eichenburg returned for a 15 yard TD (Noah Ruggles kick) – Ohio State 26–10, Drive: 1 play, 0 yards, 0:08

Third quarter

- 9:36 OSU - Marvin Harrison Jr. 6 yard pass from C. J. Stroud (Noah Ruggles kick) – Ohio State 33–10, Drive: 4 plays, 15 yards, 2:08
- 4:43 OSU - Emeka Egbuka 13 yard pass from C. J. Stroud (Noah Ruggles kick) – Ohio State 40–10, Drive: 4 plays, 55 yards, 1:54

Fourth quarter

- 13:26 OSU - Julian Fleming 79 yard pass from C. J. Stroud (Noah Ruggles kick) – Ohio State 47–10, Drive: 3 plays, 90 yards, 1:26
- 7:59 OSU - Mitch Rossi 3 yard pass from C. J. Stroud (Noah Ruggles kick) – Ohio State 54–10, Drive: 8 plays, 40 yards, 3:28

Statistics	Iowa	No. 2 Ohio State
First downs	8	16
Plays–yards	59–158	62–360
Rushes–yards	35–77	30–66
Passing yards	81	294
Passing: comp–att–int	11–24–3	22–32–1
Turnovers		
Time of possession	29:14	30:46

Team	Category	Player	Statistics
Iowa	Passing	Spencer Petras	6–14, 49 yards, 0 TD, 2 INT
Iowa	Rushing	Leshon Williams	9 carries, 31 yards, 0 TD
Iowa	Receiving	Sam LaPorta	6 receptions, 55 yards, 0 TD
No. 2 Ohio State	Passing	C. J. Stroud	20–30, 286 yards, 4 TD, 1 INT
No. 2 Ohio State	Rushing	TreVeyon Henderson	11 carries, 38 yards, 0 TD
No. 2 Ohio State	Receiving	Julian Fleming	2 receptions, 105 yards, 1 TD

=== at No. 13 Penn State ===
No. 2 Ohio State Buckeyes (7-0) at No. 13 Penn State Nittany Lions (6-1) – Game summary

Quarter	1	2	3	4	Total
No. 2 Ohio State	10	3	3	28	44
No. 13 Penn State	0	14	0	17	31

at Beaver Stadium, University Park, Pennsylvania

- Date: October 29
- Game time: 12:00 p.m. EDT
- Game weather: Sunny, 51 °F (11 °C)
- Game attendance: 108,433
- Referee: Jeffrey Servinski
- TV announcers (FOX): Gus Johnson (play-by-play), Joel Klatt (analyst), and Jenny Taft (sideline reporter)
- Spread: Ohio State –15.5 • Odds to win: Ohio State 79.6% •

Game information

First quarter

- 9:47 OSU - Noah Ruggles kick a 38 yard field goal - Ohio State 3-0, Drive: 9 plays, 55 yards, 5:13
- 2:48 OSU - Miyan Williams runs for a 4 yard TD (Noah Ruggles kick) - Ohio State 10-0, Drive: 3 plays, 41 yards, 1:54

Second quarter

- 11:13 PSU - Parker Washington from Sean Clifford for a 58 yards (Jake Pinegar kick) Ohio State 10-7, Drive: 6 plays, 73 yards, 2:49
- 6:50 PSU - KeAndre Lambert-Smith from Sean Clifford for a 23 yard TD (Jake Pinegar kick) Penn State 14-10, Drive: 6 plays, 75 yards, 1:49
- 3:15 OSU - Noah Ruggles kicks a 37 yard field goal - Penn State 14-13, Drive: 7 plays, 46 yards, 3:36

Third quarter

- 0:10 OSU - Noah Ruggles kicks a 40 yard field goal - Ohio State 16-14, Drive: 6 plays, 45 yards, 3:01

Fourth quarter

- 9:26 PSU - Kaytron Allen runs for a 1 yard TD (Jake Pinegar kick) - Penn State 21-16, Drive: 13 plays, 75 yards, 5:44
- 8:51 OSU - TreVeyon Henderson runs for a 41 yard TD (Noah Ruggles kick) - Ohio State 23-21, Drive: 3 plays, 75 yards, 0:35
- 8:17 OSU - Cade Stover from C. J. Stroud for a 24 yard TD (Noah Ruggles kick) - Ohio State 30-21, Drive: 1 play, 24 yards, 0:09
- 5:49 PSU - Jake Pinegar kicks a 44 yard field goal - Ohio State 30-24, Drive: 7 plays, 48 yards, 2:28
- 2:52 OSU - TreVeyon Henderson runs for a 7 yard TD (Noah Ruggles kick) - Ohio State 37-24, Drive: 7 plays, 75 yards, 2:57
- 2:42 OSU - Sean Clifford pass intercepted by JT Tuimoloau returned for a 14 yard TD (Noah Ruggles kick) - Ohio State 44-24, Drive: 1 play, 0 yards, 0:10
- 1:12 PSU - Kaytron Allen from Sean Clifford for a 5 yard TD (Jake Pinegar kick) - Ohio State 44-31,Drive: 8 plays, 75 yards, 1:30

Statistics	No. 2 Ohio State	No. 13 Penn State
First downs	21	24
Plays–yards	60–452	80–482
Rushes–yards	26–98	33–111
Passing yards	354	371
Passing: comp–att–int	26–34–0	32–47–3
Turnovers		
Time of possession	29:34	30:26

Team	Category	Player	Statistics
No. 2 Ohio State	Passing	C. J. Stroud	26–33, 354 yards, 1 TD
No. 2 Ohio State	Rushing	TreVeyon Henderson	16 carries, 78 yards, 2 TDs
No. 2 Ohio State	Receiving	Marvin Harrison Jr.	10 receptions, 185 yards
No. 13 Penn State	Passing	Sean Clifford	32–47, 371 yards, 3 TDs, 3 INTs
No. 13 Penn State	Rushing	Kaytron Allen	12 carries, 76 yards, 1 TD
No. 13 Penn State	Receiving	Parker Washington	11 receptions, 179 yards, 1 TD

=== at Northwestern ===
No. 2 Ohio State Buckeyes (8-0) at Northwestern Wildcats (1-7) – Game summary

Quarter	1	2	3	4	Total
No. 2 Ohio State	0	7	7	7	21
Northwestern	7	0	0	0	7

at Ryan Field, Evanston, Illinois

- Date: November 5
- Game time: 12:00 p.m. EDT
- Game weather: Rain, windy, 62 °F (17 °C)
- Game attendance: 42,774
- Referee: Ron Snodgrass
- TV announcers (ABC): Sean McDonough (play-by-play), Todd Blackledge (analyst), and Molly McGrath (sideline reporter)
- Spread: Ohio State –38 • Odds to win: Ohio State 98.4% •

Game information

First quarter

- 6:45 NU – Evan Hull runs for 16 yards (Adam Stage kick) – Northwestern 7–0, Drive: 9 plays, 80 yards, 3:18

Second quarter

- 2:26 OSU – Emeka Egbuka runs for 15 yards (Noah Ruggles kick) – Tied 7–7, Drive: 6 plays, 46 yards, 2:29

Third quarter

- 8:44 OSU – Miyan Williams runs for 27 yards (Noah Ruggles kick) Ohio State 14–7, Drive: 6 plays, 45 yards, 2:01

Fourth quarter

- 4:21 OSU – Miyan Williams runs for 2 yards (Noah Ruggles kick) Ohio State 21–7, Drive: 5 plays, 62 yards, 2:06

Statistics	No. 2 Ohio State	Northwestern
First downs	13	17
Plays–yards	61–283	76–285
Rushes–yards	35–207	59–206
Passing yards	76	79
Passing: comp–att–int	10–26–0	10–17–0
Turnovers		
Time of possession	23:34	36:26

Team	Category	Player	Statistics
No. 2 Ohio State	Passing	C. J. Stroud	10–26, 76 yards, 0 TD
No. 2 Ohio State	Rushing	Miyan Williams	26 carries, 111 yards, 2 TD
No. 2 Ohio State	Receiving	Marvin Harrison, Jr.	5 receptions, 51 yards, 0 TD
Northwestern	Passing	Brendan Sullivan	10–17, 79 yards, 0 TD
Northwestern	Rushing	Evan Hull	30 carries, 122 yards, 1 TD
Northwestern	Receiving	Malik Washington	6 receptions, 49 yards, 0 TD

=== vs Indiana ===
No. 2 Ohio State Buckeyes (9-0) vs Indiana Hoosiers (3-6) – Game summary

Quarter	1	2	3	4	Total
Indiana	7	0	0	7	14
No. 2 Ohio State	21	7	14	14	56

at Ohio Stadium, Columbus, Ohio

- Date: November 12
- Game time: 12:00 p.m. EST
- Game weather: Snow, 39 °F (4 °C)
- Game attendance: 103,888
- Referee: Larry Smith
- TV announcers (FOX): Gus Johnson (play-by-play), Joel Klatt (analyst), and Jenny Taft (sideline reporter)
- Spread: Ohio State –40 • Odds to win: Ohio State 98.5% •

Game information

First quarter

- 9:42 OSU - Emeka Egbuka from C. J. Stroud for a 6 yard TD (Noah Ruggles kick) - Ohio State 7-0, Drive: 6 plays, 65 yards, 2:19
- 4:31 OSU - Dallen Hayden runs for a 14 yard TD (Noah Ruggles kick) - Ohio State 14-0, Drive: 8 plays, 78 yards, 3:37
- 2:37 OSU - Marvin Harrison Jr. from C. J. Stroud for a 58 yard TD (Noah Ruggles kick) - Ohio State 21-0, Drive: 1 play, 58 yards, 0:09
- 0:04 IU - A. J. Barner from Dexter Williams II for a 7 yard TD (Charles Campbell kick) - Ohio State 21-7, Drive: 6 plays, 75 yards, 2:33

Second quarter

- 10:41 OSU - Miyan Williams runs for a 48 yard TD (Noah Ruggles kick) - Ohio State 28-7, Drive: 3 plays, 57 yards, 0:27

Third quarter

- 9:33 OSU - Cade Stover from C. J. Stroud for a 1 yard TD (Noah Ruggles kick) - Ohio State 35-7,Drive: 2 plays, 2 yards, 0:15
- 7:38 OSU - Cade Stover from C. J. Stroud for a 12 yard TD (Noah Ruggles kick) - Ohio State 42-7, Drive: 3 plays, 52 yards, 1:15

Fourth quarter

- 14:07 OSU - Xavier Johnson runs for a 71 yard TD (Noah Ruggles kick) - Ohio State 49-7, Drive: 1 play, 71 yards, 0:16
- 12:03 IU - Donaven McCulley from Dexter Williams II for a 19 yard TD (Charles Campbell kick) - Ohio State 49-14,Drive: 2 plays, 18 yards, 0:29
- 8:49 OSU - Kamryn Babb from C. J. Stroud for a 8 yard TD (Noah Ruggles kick) - Ohio State 56-14, Drive: 6 plays, 75 yards, 3:14

Statistics	Indiana	No. 2 Ohio State
First downs	11	27
Plays–yards	64–269	73–662
Rushes–yards	41–150	43–340
Passing yards	119	322
Passing: comp–att–int	9–24–0	19–30–0
Turnovers		
Time of possession	26:41	33:19

Team	Category	Player	Statistics
Indiana	Passing	Dexter Williams II	6-19, 107 yards, 2 TDs
Indiana	Rushing	Dexter Williams II	16 carries, 46 yards
Indiana	Receiving	Andison Coby	1 reception 49 yards
No. 2 Ohio State	Passing	C. J. Stroud	17-28, 297 yards, 5 TDs
No. 2 Ohio State	Rushing	Miyan Williams	15 carries, 147 yards, 1 TD
No. 2 Ohio State	Receiving	Marvin Harrison Jr.	7 receptions, 135 yards, 1 TD

=== at Maryland ===
No. 2 Ohio State Buckeyes (10-0) at Maryland Terrapins (6-4) – Game summary

Quarter	1	2	3	4	Total
No. 2 Ohio State	7	3	17	16	43
Maryland	6	7	0	17	30

at SECU Stadium, College Park, Maryland

- Date: November 19
- Game time: 3:30 p.m. EST
- Game weather: Cloudy, 45 °F (7 °C)
- Game attendance: 41,969
- Referee: Ron Snodgrass
- TV announcers (ABC): Joe Tessitore (play-by-play), Greg McElroy (analyst), and Katie George (sideline reporter)
- Spread: Ohio State –26 • Odds to win: Ohio State 90.3% •

Game information

First quarter

- OSU – 13:28 T.J. Henderson 31 yard pass from C. J. Stroud (Noah Ruggles kick) - Ohio State 7–0, Drive: 6 plays, 75 yards, 1:32
- MD – 8:47 Chad Ryland kicks a 31 yard Field Goal – Ohio State 7–3, Drive: 9 plays, 61 yards, 4:41
- MD – 3:52 Chad Ryland kicks a 21 yard Field Goal – Ohio State 7–6, Drive: 8 plays, 54 yards, 3:58

Second quarter

- OSU – 10:02 Noah Ruggles kicks a 33 yard Field Goal – Ohio State 10–6, Drive: 14 plays, 75 yards, 4:59
- MD – 3:52 CJ Dippre 1 yard pass from Taulia Tagovailoa (Chad Ryland kick) – Maryland 13–10, Drive: 14 plays, 75 yards, 6:10

Third quarter

- OSU – 12:13 Dallan Hayden runs for 8 yard TD (Noah Ruggles kick) – Ohio State 17–13, Drive: 2 plays, 14 yards, 0:23
- OSU – 7:52 Noah Ruggles kicks a 47 yard Field Goal – Ohio State 20–13, Drive: 9 plays, 35 yards, 3:04
- OSU – 0:16 Dallan Hayden runs for a yard Run (Noah Ruggles kick) – Ohio State 27–13, Drive: 11 plays, 88 yards, 5:08

Fourth quarter

- MD – 13:53 Taulia Tagovailoa runs for 5 yard TD (Jacob Copeland catches Taulia Tagovailoa pass for Two-Point Conversion) – Ohio State 27–21, Drive: 5 plays, 75 yards, 1:23
- OSU – 12:36 Dallan Hayden runs for 13 Yard TD (Noah Ruggles PAT is blocked) – Ohio State 33–21, Drive: 4 plays, 53 yards, 1:17
- MD – 12:36 D2P Jakorian Bennett scores a Defensive PAT Conversion – Ohio State 33–23, Drive: 4 plays, 53 yards, 1:17
- MD – 9:49 Taulia Tagovailoa 1 yard pass to Jashaun Jones (Chad Ryland kick) – Ohio State 33–30, Drive: 7 plays, 74 yards, 2:47
- OSU – 0:42 Noah Ruggles kicks a 45 Yd Field Goal – Ohio State 36–30, Drive: 11 plays, 61 yards, 5:12
- OSU – 0:09 Steele Chambers returns a 1 Yd fumble for a TD (Noah Ruggles kick) – Ohio State 43–30, Drive: 2 plays, -15 yards, 0:33

Statistics	No. 2 Ohio State	Maryland
First downs	26	20
Plays–yards	73–401	68–402
Rushes–yards	43–160	31–84
Passing yards	241	318
Passing: comp–att–int	18–30–0	27–37–0
Turnovers		
Time of possession	30:15	29:45

Team	Category	Player	Statistics
No. 2 Ohio State	Passing	C. J. Stroud	18-30, 241 yards, 1 TD
No. 2 Ohio State	Rushing	Dallan Hayden	27 carries, 146 yards, 3 TD
No. 2 Ohio State	Receiving	Emeka Egbuka	6 receptions, 82 yards, 0 TD
Maryland	Passing	Taulia Tagovailoa	26-36, 293 yards, 2 TD
Maryland	Rushing	Roman Hemby	11 carries, 39 yards, 0 TD
Maryland	Receiving	Dontay Demus	5 receptions, 67 yards, 0 TD

=== vs No. 3 Michigan ===
No. 3 Michigan Wolverines (11-0) vs No. 2 Ohio State Buckeyes (11-0) – Game summary

Quarter	1	2	3	4	Total
No. 3 Michigan	3	14	7	21	45
No. 2 Ohio State	10	10	0	3	23

at Ohio Stadium, Columbus, Ohio

- Date: November 26
- Game time: 12:00 p.m. EST
- Game weather: Sunny, 50 °F (10 °C)
- Referee: Mark Kluczynski
- TV announcers (FOX): Gus Johnson (play-by-play), Joel Klatt (analyst), and Tom Rinaldi (sideline reporter)
- Spread: Ohio State –8 • Odds to win: Ohio State 71.0% •

Game information

First quarter

- 10:02 OSU - Emeka Egbuka from C. J. Stroud for a 4 yard TD (Noah Ruggles kick) - Ohio State 7-0 Drive: 12 plays, 81 yards, 4:50
- 6:07 MU - Jake Moody kicks a 49 yard field goal - Ohio State 7-3 Drive: 10 plays, 44 yards, 3:55
- 1:19 OSU - Noah Ruggles kicks a 32 yard field goal - Ohio State 10-3 Drive: 10 plays, 58 yards 4:41

Second quarter

- 7:26 MU - Cornelius Johnson from J. J. McCarthy for a 69 yard TD (Jake Moody kick) - Tied 10-10 Drive: 3 plays, 70 yards, 1:34
- 5:36 OSU - Noah Ruggles kicks a 47 yard field goal - Ohio State 13-10 Drive: 6 plays, 41 yards, 1:50
- 5:24 MU - Cornelius Johnson from J. J. McCarthy for a 75 yard TD (Jake Moody kick) - Michigan 17-13 Drive: 1 play, 75 yards, 0:12
- 3:49 OSU - Marvin Harrison Jr. from C. J. Stroud for a 42 yard TD (Noah Ruggles kick) - Ohio State 20-17 Drive: 4 plays, 79 yards, 1:31

Third quarter

- 11:56 MU - Colston Loveland from J.J McCarthy for a 45 yard TD (Jake Moody kick) - Michigan 24-20 Drive: 7 plays, 75 yards, 3:04

Fourth quarter

- 13:10 MU - J. J. McCarthy runs for a 3 yard TD (Jake Moody kick) - Michigan 31-20 Drive: 15 plays, 80 yards, 7:51
- 7:23 OSU - Noah Ruggles kicks a 27 yard field goal - Michigan 31-23 Drive: 7 plays, 52 yards, 1:58
- 7:11 MU - Donovan Edwards runs for a 75 yard TD (Jake Moody kick) - Michigan 38-23 Drive: 1 play, 75 yards, 0:12
- 3:19 MU - Donovan Edwards runs for a 85 yards TD (Jake Moody kick) - Michigan 45-23 Drive: 3 plays, 92 yards, 1:00

Statistics	No. 3 Michigan	No. 2 Ohio State
First downs	16	23
Plays–yards	60–530	77–492
Rushes–yards	35–252	29–143
Passing yards	278	349
Passing: comp–att–int	13–25–0	31–48–2
Turnovers		
Time of possession	28:14	31:46

Team	Category	Player	Statistics
No. 3 Michigan	Passing	J. J. McCarthy	12-24, 263 yards, 3 TD
No. 3 Michigan	Rushing	Donovan Edwards	22 carries, 216 yards, 2 TD
No. 3 Michigan	Receiving	Cornelius Johnson	4 receptions, 160 yards, 2 TD
No. 2 Ohio State	Passing	C. J. Stroud	31-48, 349 yards, 2 TD, 2 INT
No. 2 Ohio State	Rushing	Chip Trayanum	14 carries, 83 yards
No. 2 Ohio State	Receiving	Emeka Egbuka	9 receptions, 125 yards, 1 TD

=== vs. No. 1 Georgia—Peach Bowl–CFP Semifinal ===
No. 4 Ohio State Buckeyes (11-1) vs. No. 1 Georgia Bulldogs (13-0) – Game summary

Quarter	1	2	3	4	Total
No. 4 Ohio State	7	21	10	3	41
No. 1 Georgia	7	17	0	18	42

at Mercedes-Benz Stadium, Atlanta, Georgia

- Date: December 31
- Game time: 8:00 p.m. EST
- Game weather: Indoors
- Game attendance: 79,330
- Referee: Chris Coyte
- TV announcers (ESPN/ESPN Radio): Chris Fowler (play-by-play), Kirk Herbstreit (analyst), Holly Rowe, and Laura Rutledge (sideline reporters)/Joe Tessitore (play-by-play), Greg McElroy (analyst), and Katie George (sideline reporter)
- Spread: Georgia –5.5 • Odds to win: Georgia 57.7% •

Game information

First quarter

- 8:16 OSU - Marvin Harrison Jr. 31 Yd pass from C.J. Stroud (Noah Ruggles Kick) - Ohio State 7-0 Drive: 4 plays, 71 yards, 2:15
- 3:15 UGA - Kenny McIntosh 25 Yd pass from Stetson Bennett (Jack Podlesny Kick) - Tied 7-7 Drive: 8 plays, 75 yards, 5:01

Second quarter

- 12:30 OSU - Miyan Williams 2 Yd Run (Noah Ruggles Kick) - Ohio State 14-7 Drive: 11 plays, 75 yards, 5:45
- 10:56 OSU - Marvin Harrison Jr. 16 Yd pass from C.J. Stroud (Noah Ruggles Kick) - Ohio State 21-7 Drive: 3 plays, 30 yards, 1:24
- 9:16 UGA - Kendall Milton 11 Yd Run (Jack Podlesny Kick) - Ohio State 21-14 Drive, 4 plays, 75 yards, 1:40
- 6:07 UGA - Stetson Bennett 3 Yd Run (Jack Podlesny Kick) - Tied 21-21 Drive: 3 plays, 62 yards, 1:34
- 1:44 UGA - Jack Podlesny 32 Yd Field Goal - Georgia 24-21 Drive: 8 plays, 53 yards, 2:28
- 0:49 OSU - Xavier Johnson 37 Yd pass from C.J. Stroud (Noah Ruggles Kick) - Ohio State 28-24 Drive: 4 plays, 75 yards, 0:55

Third quarter

- 10:37 OSU - Emeka Egbuka 10 Yd pass from C.J. Stroud (Noah Ruggles Kick) - Ohio State 35-24 Drive: 6 plays, 70 yards, 3:19
- 0:31 OSU - Noah Ruggles 25 Yd Field Goal - Ohio State 38-24 Drive: 7 plays, 59 yards, 3:19

Fourth quarter

- 10:14 UGA - Jack Podlesny 31 Yd Field Goal - Ohio State 38-27 Drive: 12 plays, 62 yards, 5:17
- 8:14 UGA - Arian Smith 76 Yd pass from Stetson Bennett (Stetson Bennett Pass to Ladd McConkey for Two-Point Conversion) - Ohio State 38-35 Drive: 1 play, 76 yards, 0:10
- 2:43 OSU - Noah Ruggles 48 Yd Field Goal - Ohio State 41-35 Drive: 11 plays, 45 yards, 5:58
- 0:54 UGA - Adonai Mitchell 10 Yd pass from Stetson Bennett (Jack Podlesny Kick) - Georgia 42-41 Drive: 5 plays, 72 yards, 1:49

Statistics	No. 4 Ohio State	No. 1 Georgia
First downs	24	22
Plays–yards	66-467	60-533
Rushes–yards	32-119	26-135
Passing yards	348	398
Passing: comp–att–int	23-34-0	23-34-1
Turnovers		
Time of possession	32:36	27:24

Team	Category	Player	Statistics
No. 4 Ohio State	Passing	C. J. Stroud	23/34, 348 yards, 4 TD
No. 4 Ohio State	Rushing	Dallan Hayden	9 carries, 43 yards
No. 4 Ohio State	Receiving	Emeka Egbuka	8 receptions, 112 yards, TD
No. 1 Georgia	Passing	Stetson Bennett	23/34, 398 yards, 3 TD, INT
No. 1 Georgia	Rushing	Kenny McIntosh	5 carries, 70 yards
No. 1 Georgia	Receiving	Arian Smith	3 receptions, 129 yards, TD

== Rankings ==
Ranking movements Legend: ██ Increase in ranking ██ Decrease in ranking т = Tied with team above or below ( ) = First-place votes
	Week															
Poll	Pre	1	2	3	4	5	6	7	8	9	10	11	12	13	14	Final
AP	2 (6)	3 (2)	3 (1)	3 (1)	3 (4)	3 (10)	2 (20)	2 (17)	2 (18)	2т (15)	2 (1)	2 (1)	2 (1)	5	4	4
Coaches	2 (5)	3 (2)	3 (1)	3 (1)	3 (4)	3 (7)	3 (10)	2 (17)	2 (17)	2 (13)	2	2 (1)	2 (1)	5	3	4
CFP	Not released									2	2	2	2	5	4	Not released

== Roster ==
2022 Ohio State Buckeyes football team roster
Players
Coaches
Offense

Pos.	#	Name	Class
WR	0	Kamryn Babb (C)	Sr
WR	2	Emeka Egbuka	So
RB	3	Miyan Williams	Jr
WR	4	Julian Fleming	Jr
RB	5	Dallan Hayden	Fr
QB	6	Kyle McCord	So
QB	7	C. J. Stroud (C)	Jr
TE	8	Cade Stover (C)	Sr
WR	9	Jayden Ballard	So
WR	10	Xavier Johnson	Sr
WR	11	Jaxon Smith-Njigba	Jr
WR	12	Caleb Burton	Fr
WR	13	Kaleb Brown	Fr
WR	14	Kojo Antwi	Fr
QB	15	Devin Brown	Fr
QB	16	Mason Maggs	Fr
WR	17	Kyion Grayes	Fr
WR	18	Marvin Harrison Jr.	So
QB	19	Chad Ray	So
RB	21	Evan Pryor	So
WR	25	Kai Saunders	Fr
RB	26	Cayden Saunders	So
RB	28	TC Caffey	Fr
WR	30	Corban Cleveland	So
RB	32	TreVeyon Henderson	So
RB	33	Mason Brecht	Fr
TE	34	Mitch Rossi	Sr
TE	43	Riordin Stauffer	Fr
TE	49	Patrick Gurd	Jr
OL	53	Luke Wypler	Jr
OL	54	Toby Wilson	So
OL	55	Matthew Jones	Sr
OL	60	Ryan Smith	Sr
OL	61	Jack Forsman	So
OL	64	Quinton Burke	Jr
OL	65	Zen Michalski	So
OL	66	Enokk Vimahi	Sr
OL	67	Tegra Tshabola	Fr
OL	68	George Fitzpatrick	Fr
OL	69	Trey Leroux	Jr
OL	70	Josh Fryar	Jr
OL	71	Ben Christman	So
OL	72	Avery Henry	Fr
OL	73	Grant Toutant	Jr
OL	74	Donovan Jackson	So
OL	75	Carson Hinzman	Fr
OL	77	Paris Johnson Jr.	Jr
OL	78	Jakob James	Jr
OL	79	Dawand Jones	Sr
WR	80	Blaize Exline	Fr
TE	81	Sam Hart	So
WR	82	David Adolph	Fr
WR	83	Joop Mitchell	So
TE	84	Joe Royer	Jr
WR	87	Reis Stocksdale	So
TE	88	Gee Scott Jr.	Jr
TE	89	Zak Herbstreit	So

Defense

Pos.	#	Name	Class
S	2	Kourt Williams II (C)	Jr
LB	3	Teradja Mitchell (C)	Sr
CB	4	JK Johnson	So
DT	6	Taron Vincent	Sr
CB	7	Jordan Hancock	So
DE	8	Javontae Jean-Baptiste	Sr
DE	9	Zach Harrison	Sr
CB	10	Denzel Burke	So
LB	11	C. J. Hicks	Fr
S	12	Lathan Ransom	Jr
S	13	Cameron Martinez	Jr
S	14	Ronnie Hickman	Sr
S	15	Tanner McCalister	Sr
LB	17	Mitchell Melton	Jr
CB	18	Jyaire Brown	Fr
LB	19	Chip Trayanum	Jr
S	20	Sonny Styles	Fr
LB	21	Palaie Gaoteote IV	Sr
LB	22	Steele Chambers	Jr
DE	23	Omari Abor	Fr
S	24	Jantzen Dunn	So
S	25	Jaylen Johnson	So
CB	26	Cameron Brown	Sr
LB	28	Reid Carrico	So
CB	29	Ryan Turner	Fr
LB	30	Cody Simon	Jr
S	32	Brenton Jones	Fr
DE	33	Jack Sawyer	So
CB	34	Collin Kaufmann	Fr
LB	35	Tommy Eichenberg (C)	So
LB	36	Gabe Powers	Fr
S	37	Kye Stokes	Fr
DB	38	Cameron Kittle	Jr
DB	39	Andrew Moore	So
S	41	Josh Proctor	Sr
CB	42	Lloyd McFarquhar	Sr
CB	43	Diante Griffin	Fr
DE	44	JT Tuimoloau	So
LB	46	Elias Meyers	Sr
LB	50	Jackson Kuwatch	So
DT	51	Mike Hall Jr.	Fr
LB	52	Jay Stoker	Fr
DE	54	Tyler Friday (C)	Sr
DE	56	Zack Cicero	Fr
LB	57	Jalen Pace	So
DT	58	Ty Hamilton	Jr
DL	62	Bryce Prater	So
DL	63	Zach Prater	So
DT	86	Jerron Cage	Sr
DT	90	Jaden McKenzie	Sr
DT	91	Tyleik Williams	So
DE	92	Caden Curry	Fr
DT	93	Hero Kanu	Fr
DE	97	Kenyatta Jackson	Fr

Special teams

Pos.	#	Name	Class
P	29	Jesse Mirco	So
K	38	Jayden Fielding	Fr
LS	42	Bradley Robinson	Sr
LS	48	Max Lomonico	So
LS	94	Mason Arnold	So
K	95	Noah Ruggles	GS
P	96	Michael O'Shaughnessy	Sr
K	98	Jake Seibert	Jr

Head coach

- Ryan Day

Coordinators/assistant coaches

- Larry Johnson (associate head coach / defensive line)
- Justin Frye (associate head coach for offense / offensive line)
- Jim Knowles (defensive coordinator / linebackers)
- Kevin Wilson (offensive coordinator / tight ends)
- Parker Fleming (special teams coordinator)
- Tony Alford (running backs)
- Brian Hartline (wide receivers)
- Corey Dennis (quarterbacks)
- Todd Fitch (offensive analyst)
- Tim Walton (secondary coach / cornerbacks coach)

Legend

- (C) Team captain
- (S) Suspended
- (I) Ineligible
- Injured
- Redshirt

Roster

== Staff ==
Coach	Title	Years at Ohio State
Ryan Day	Head Coach	6th
Gene Smith	Vice President / Athletic Director	18th
Mickey Marotti	Assistant Athletic Director for Football Sports Performance	13th
Tony Alford	Assistant Head Coach for offense / running game coordinator / running backs coach	8th
Justin Frye	Associate head coach for offense / offensive line	1st
Larry Johnson	Associate head coach / defensive line coach	9th
Kevin Wilson	Offensive coordinator / tight ends coach	6th
Jim Knowles	Defensive coordinator / linebackers coach	1st
Parker Fleming	Special Teams Coordinator	7th
Brian Hartline	Passing Game Coordinator / wide receivers coach	6th
Corey Dennis	Quarterbacks coach	8th
Tim Walton	Secondary Coach / Cornerbacks coach	1st
Perry Eliano	Safeties coach	1st
Todd Fitch	Offensive Analyst	2nd
Matt Guerrieri	Senior Advisor / Analyst	1st
Mike Sollenne	Graduate Assistant (OL)	1st
Keegan O'Hara	Graduate Assistant (WR)	1st
Brent Zdebski	Quality Control (Defense)	1st

== Awards and honors ==
Pre-season All-American Honors
Player	Position	AP	ESPN	Sporting News	WCFF	Designation
Jaxon Smith-Njigba	WR	1st Team	1st Team	1st Team	1st Team	Unanimous
TreVeyon Henderson	RB	1st Team	1st Team	1st Team	1st Team	Unanimous
Dawand Jones	OL	2nd Team			2nd Team	
Noah Ruggles	PK			2nd Team	2nd Team	
C. J. Stroud	QB	2nd Team		2nd Team		
Paris Johnson	OT		1st Team	2nd Team		

Big Ten Weekly Honors
Date	Player	Position	Award
Week 3	Marvin Harrison Jr.	WR	co-Offensive Player of the Week
Week 4	C. J. Stroud	QB	Offensive Player of the Week
Week 5	Tommy Eichenberg	LB	co-Defensive Player of the Week
Week 6	Miyan Williams	RB	Offensive Player of the Week
Week 7	C. J. Stroud (2)	QB	Offensive Player of the Week
Week 9	Noah Ruggles	PK	Special Teams Player of the Week
Week 10	JT Tuimoloau	DE	Defensive Player of the Week
Week 12	C. J. Stroud (3)	QB	Offensive Player of the Week

National Weekly Honors
Date	Player	Position	Award
October 26	Tommy Eichenberg	LB	Lott IMPACT Trophy Player of the Week
October 31	JT Tuimoloau	DE	Walter Camp Award National Defensive Player of the Week
November 2	Tommy Eichenberg (2)	LB	Lott IMPACT Trophy Player of the Week
November 15	C. J. Stroud	QB	Maxwell Award Player of the Week

Annual Awards
Player	Award
C. J. Stroud	Heisman Trophy Finalist
C. J. Stroud	Manning Award Finalist
C. J. Stroud	Walter Camp Award Finalist
C. J. Stroud	Maxwell Award Finalist
C. J. Stroud	Davey O'Brien Award Finalist
Marvin Harrison Jr.	Biletnikoff Award Finalist
Big Ten Awards
C. J. Stroud	Big Ten Offensive Player of the Year
C. J. Stroud	Big Ten Quarterback of the Year
Marvin Harrison Jr.	Big Ten Receiver of the Year

All-Big Ten
Player	Position	Coaches	Media
Tommy Eichenberg	LB	1	1
Marvin Harrison Jr.	WR	1	1
Paris Johnson Jr.	OL	1	1
C. J. Stroud	QB	1	1
Zach Harrison	DL	2	1
Donovan Jackson	OL	2	1
JT Tuimoloau	DL	1	2
Emeka Egbuka	WR	2	2
Matthew Jones	OL	2	2
Dawand Jones	OL	3	2
Ronnie Hickman	SAF	3	3
Mike Hall Jr.	DL	Hon.	3
Noah Ruggles	K	Hon.	3
Cade Stover	TE	Hon.	3
Luke Wypler	C	Hon.	3
Denzel Burke	CB	Hon.	Hon.
Steele Chambers	CB	Hon.	Hon.
Tanner McCalister	SAF	Hon.	Hon.
Jesse Mirco	P	Hon.	Hon.
Lathan Ransom	SAF	Hon.	Hon.
Jack Sawyer	DL	Hon.	–
TreVeyon Henderson	RB	–	Hon.
Tyleik Williams	DL	–	Hon.
Hon. = Honorable mention.

== Players drafted into the NFL ==
Round	Pick	Player	Position	NFL club
1	2	C. J. Stroud	QB	Houston Texans
1	6	Paris Johnson Jr.	OT	Arizona Cardinals
1	20	Jaxon Smith-Njigba	WR	Seattle Seahawks
3	75	Zach Harrison	DE	Atlanta Falcons
4	111	Dawand Jones	OT	Cleveland Browns
6	190	Luke Wypler	C	Cleveland Browns
