= 2026 UNLV Rebels football team =

American college football season

2026 UNLV Rebels football
- Conference: Mountain West Conference
- Record: 7–4 (5–2 MW)
- Head coach: Dan Mullen (2nd season)
- Offensive coordinator: Corey Dennis (2nd season)
- Offensive scheme: Spread
- Defensive coordinator: Paul Guenther (2nd season)
- Base defense: Multiple 4–2–5
- Home stadium: Allegiant Stadium

2026 Mountain West Conference football standings
	Conf.			Overall
Team	W		L	W		L
New Mexico	6	–	1	9	–	2
North Dakota State	6	–	2	9	–	2
Wyoming	6	–	2	7	–	4
Air Force	5	–	2	9	–	2
UNLV	5	–	2	7	–	4
Nevada	4	–	3	5	–	6
San Jose State	3	–	5	5	–	7
Hawaii	2	–	6	3	–	8
UTEP	0	–	7	1	–	10
Northern Illinois	0	–	7	0	–	11
Championship: December 4, 2026
As of November 22, 2026; Rankings from CFP rankings

The 2026 UNLV Rebels football team will represent the University of Nevada, Las Vegas (UNLV) as a member of the Mountain West Conference (MW) during the 2026 NCAA Division I FBS football season. They will be led by second-year head coach Dan Mullen, the Rebels will play their home games at Allegiant Stadium in Paradise, Nevada.

== Schedule ==
Date	Time	Opponent	Site	TV	Result	Attendance
August 29	7:00 p.m.	Memphis*	Allegiant Stadium; Paradise, NV	FOX	L 21–27	31,384
September 5	7:00 p.m.	at Hawaii	Clarence T. C. Ching Athletics Complex; Honolulu, HI	The CW	W 21–6	15,014
September 12	12:45 p.m.	at North Texas*	DATCU Stadium; Denton, TX	ESPNU	L 6–44	20,331
September 26	9:00 a.m.	at Akron*	InfoCision Stadium–Summa Field; Akron, OH	ESPN+	W 38–10	5,607
October 3	12:30 p.m.	California*	Allegiant Stadium; Paradise, NV	CBSSN	W 39–31	30,632
October 10	4:00 p.m.	North Dakota State^{†}	Allegiant Stadium; Paradise, NV	The CW	W 13–7	33,516
October 17	12:30 p.m.	at Air Force	Falcon Stadium; Colorado Springs, CO	CBSSN	L 31–41	23,636
October 31	7:30 p.m.	Northern Illinois	Allegiant Stadium; Paradise, NV	CBSSN	W 31–24	22,382
November 7	7:30 p.m.	Wyoming	Allegiant Stadium; Paradise, NV	CBSSN	L 35–41	25,277
November 14	4:30 p.m.	at New Mexico	University Stadium; Albuquerque, NM	The CW	W 21–17	37,440
November 21	4:00 p.m.	at San Jose State	CEFCU Stadium; San Jose, CA	CBSSN	W 24–22	8,187
November 28	6:00 p.m.	Nevada	Allegiant Stadium; Paradise, NV (Fremont Cannon)	CBSSN		
*Non-conference game; ^{†}Homecoming; All times are in Pacific time

== Game summaries ==
=== Memphis ===
Memphis Tigers (0–0) at UNLV Rebels (0–0) – Game summary

Quarter	1	2	3	4	Total
Tigers	0	7	17	3	27
Rebels	0	14	7	0	21

at Allegiant Stadium • Paradise, Nevada

- Date: August 29
- Game time: 7:00 p.m. PDT
- Game weather: none (played indoors)
- Game attendance: 31,384
- Referee: Christian Watson
- TV announcers (FOX): Tim Brando, Devin Gardner and Josh Sims

Game information

First quarter

- No scoring plays.

Second quarter

- UNLV – Tavian McNair 38-yard pass from Jackson Arnold (Ramon Villela kick), 8:14. Rebels 7–0. Drive: 9 plays, 86 yards, 4:30.
- MEM – Hunter Tipton 16-yard pass from Marcus Stokes (Philippe Laforge kick), 5:24. Tied 7–7. Drive: 7 plays, 75 yards, 2:50.
- UNLV – Jackson Arnold 6-yard run (Ramon Villela kick), 1:56. Rebels 14–7. Drive: 8 plays, 75 yards, 3:28.

Third quarter

- MEM – Stonka Burnside 48-yard pass from Marcus Stokes (Philippe Laforge kick), 13:07. Tied 14–14. Drive: 5 plays, 70 yards, 1:46.
- UNLV – Kayden McGee 22-yard pass from Jackson Arnold (Ramon Villela kick), 10:15. Rebels 21–14. Drive: 6 plays, 85 yards, 2:48.
- MEM – Jaylin Carter 36-yard run (Philippe Laforge kick), 8:38. Tied 21–21. Drive: 3 plays, 57 yards, 1:30.
- MEM – Philippe Laforge 32-yard field goal, 0:43. Tigers 24–21. Drive: 9 plays, 53 yards, 2:27.

Fourth quarter

- MEM – Philippe Laforge 36-yard field goal, 12:11. Tigers 27–21. Drive: 8 plays, 58 yards, 2:40.

Statistics	MEM	UNLV
First downs	20	23
Plays–yards	60–418	79–460
Rushes–yards	34–195	41–169
Passing yards	223	291
Passing: comp–att–int	15–26–0	25–38–0
Turnovers	1	0
Time of possession	24:51	35:09

Team	Category	Player	Statistics
Memphis	Passing	Marcus Stokes	15/26, 223 yards, 2 TD
Memphis	Rushing	Jaylin Carter	15 carries, 97 yards, TD
Memphis	Receiving	Jemyri Davis	3 receptions, 62 yards
UNLV	Passing	Jackson Arnold	25/37, 291 yards, 2 TD
UNLV	Rushing	Jackson Arnold	21 carries, 54 yards, TD
UNLV	Receiving	Jai'Den Thomas	6 receptions, 54 yards

=== at Hawaii ===
UNLV Rebels (0–1) at Hawaii Rainbow Warriors (0–1) – Game summary

Quarter	1	2	3	4	Total
Rebels	7	7	0	7	21
Rainbow Warriors	0	3	3	0	6

at Clarence T. C. Ching Athletics Complex • Honolulu, Hawaii

- Date: September 5
- Game time: 7:00 p.m. PDT
- Game weather: Sunny, 81 °F (27 °C)
- Game attendance: 15,014
- Referee: Patrick Foy
- TV announcers (The CW): Chris Fisher, Cody Kessler and Marshall Newhouse

Game information

First quarter

- UNLV – Jackson Arnold 7-yard run (Ramon Villela kick), 9:33. Rebels 7–0. Drive: 8 plays, 80 yards, 3:07.

Second quarter

- HAW – Sean Olvera-Harle 39-yard field goal, 14:09. Rebels 7–3. Drive: 11 plays, 46 yards, 7:03.
- UNLV – Jackson Arnold 2-yard run, 1:33. Rebels 14–3. Drive: 8 plays, 74 yards, 2:19.

Third quarter

- HAW – Sean Olvera-Harle 33-yard field goal, 1:32. 'Rebels 14–6. Drive: 14 plays, 74 yards, 6:31.

Fourth quarter

- UNLV – Jai'Den Thomas 50-yard run (Ramon Villela kick), 4:51. Rebels 21–6. Drive: 1 play, 50 yards, 0:11.

Statistics	UNLV	HAW
First downs	18	20
Plays–yards	61–364	76–294
Rushes–yards	43–248	33–118
Passing yards	116	176
Passing: comp–att–int	8–18–0	17–43–1
Turnovers	0	1
Time of possession	27:55	32:05

Team	Category	Player	Statistics
UNLV	Passing	Jackson Arnold	8/18, 116 yards
UNLV	Rushing	Jai'Den Thomas	20 carries, 143 yards, TD
UNLV	Receiving	Keyan Burnett	3 receptions, 55 yards
Hawaii	Passing	Micah Alejado	17/41, 176 yards, INT
Hawaii	Rushing	DeVon Rice	15 carries, 73 yards
Hawaii	Receiving	DeVon Rice	4 receptions, 27 yards

=== at North Texas ===
UNLV Rebels (1–1) at North Texas Mean Green (0–1) – Game summary

Quarter	1	2	3	4	Total
Rebels	0	3	3	0	6
Mean Green	13	7	14	10	44

at DATCU Stadium • Denton, Texas

- Date: September 12
- Game time: 12:45 p.m. PDT
- Game weather: Sunny • Temperature: 100 °F (38 °C) • Wind: N at 9 miles per hour (14 km/h)
- Game attendance: 20,331
- Referee: Christian Watson
- TV announcers (ESPNU): Chuckie Kempf and Dustin Fox

Game information

First quarter

- UNT – Dominic De Freitas 35-yard field goal, 10:48. Mean Green 3–0. Drive: 6 plays, 28 yards, 2:37.
- UNT – Dominic De Freitas 27-yard field goal, 6:27. Mean Green 6–0. Drive: 7 plays, 14 yards, 2:27.
- UNT – Jahiem White 32-yard pass from Tayven Jackson (Dominic De Freitas kick), 3:51. Mean Green 13–0. Drive: 3 plays, 49 yards, 1:19.

Second quarter

- UNLV – Ramon Villela 39-yard field goal, 5:38. Mean Green 13–3. Drive: 7 plays, 19 yards, 3:32.
- UNT – Tayven Jackson 3-yard run (Dominic De Freitas kick), 1:56. Mean Green 20–3. Drive: 8 plays, 75 yards, 3:42.

Third quarter

- UNT – Jahiem White 5-yard run (Dominic De Freitas kick), 12:32. Mean Green 27–3. Drive: 6 plays, 75 yards, 2:28.
- UNLV – Ramon Villela 37-yard field goal, 10:45. Mean Green 27–6. Drive: 6 plays, 55 yards, 1:38.
- UNT – Max Reese 16-yard pass from Tayven Jackson (Dominic De Freitas kick), 5:39. Mean Green 34–6. Drive: 11 plays, 75 yards, 5:06.

Fourth quarter

- UNT – Brendon Haygood 9-yard run (Dominic De Freitas kick), 8:24. Mean Green 41–6. Drive: 7 plays, 46 yards, 2:28.
- UNT – Dominic De Freitas 41-yard field goal, 1:12. Mean Green 44–6. Drive: 7 plays, 32 yards, 4:08.

Statistics	UNLV	UNT
First downs	18	22
Plays–yards	72–301	67–444
Rushes–yards	39–98	38–183
Passing yards	203	261
Passing: comp–att–int	19–33–1	17–29–0
Turnovers	4	0
Time of possession	27:45	32:15

Team	Category	Player	Statistics
UNLV	Passing	Jackson Arnold	18/27, 194 yards
UNLV	Rushing	Jai'Den Thomas	10 carries, 37 yards
UNLV	Receiving	Taz Reddicks	5 receptions, 75 yards
North Texas	Passing	Tayven Jackson	15/26, 233 yards, 2 TD
North Texas	Rushing	Jahiem White	12 carries, 124 yards, TD
North Texas	Receiving	Corri Milliner	3 receptions, 65 yards

=== at Akron ===
UNLV Rebels (1–2) at Akron Zips (1–2) – Game summary

Quarter	1	2	3	4	Total
Rebels	0	0	0	0	0
Zips	0	0	0	0	0

at InfoCision Stadium–Summa Field • Akron, Ohio

- Date: September 26
- Game time: 9:00 a.m. PDT
- TV announcers (ESPN+): Anthony Lima and Patrick Murray

Statistics	UNLV	AKR
First downs		
Plays–yards		
Rushes–yards		
Passing yards		
Passing: comp–att–int		
Time of possession		

Team	Category	Player	Statistics
UNLV	Passing		
UNLV	Rushing		
UNLV	Receiving		
Akron	Passing		
Akron	Rushing		
Akron	Receiving		

=== California ===
California Golden Bears (2–2) at UNLV Rebels (2–2) – Game summary

Quarter	1	2	3	4	Total
Golden Bears	0	0	0	0	0
Rebels	0	0	0	0	0

at Allegiant Stadium • Paradise, Nevada

- Date: October 3
- Game time: 12:30 p.m. PDT
- Game weather: None (indoor stadium)
- TV announcers (CBSSN): John Sadak, Randy Cross, and Hailey Sutton

Statistics	CAL	UNLV
First downs		
Plays–yards		
Rushes–yards		
Passing yards		
Passing: comp–att–int		
Time of possession		

Team	Category	Player	Statistics
California	Passing		
California	Rushing		
California	Receiving		
UNLV	Passing		
UNLV	Rushing		
UNLV	Receiving		

=== North Dakota State ===
North Dakota State Bison (5–0) at UNLV Rebels (3–2) – Game summary

Quarter	1	2	3	4	Total
Bison	0	7	0	0	7
Rebels	7	0	3	3	13

at Allegiant Stadium • Paradise, Nevada

- Date: October 10
- Game time: 12:30 p.m. PDT
- Game weather: None (indoor stadium)
- Game attendance: 33,516
- Referee: Patrick Foy
- TV announcers (The CW): Jack McMullen (play-by-play), Cody Kessler (analyst), Marshall Newhouse (sideline)

Game information

First quarter

- (9:39) UNLV – Andre Porter 23-yard interception, Ramon Villela kick (UNLV 7–0)

Second quarter

- (6:10) NDSU – Chris Kiel 21-yard pass from Nathan Hayes, Drew Klein kick (Drive: 4 plays, 34 yards, 1:28; Tied 7–7)

Third quarter

- (2:59) UNLV – Ramon Villela 29-yard field goal (Drive: 7 plays, 42 yards, 2:59; UNLV 10–7)

Fourth quarter

- (10:57) UNLV – Ramon Villela 24-yard field goal (Drive: 6 plays, 11 yards, 3:13; UNLV 13–7)

Statistics	NDSU	UNLV
First downs	19	16
Plays–yards	61–300	64–255
Rushes–yards	39–176	48–178
Passing yards	124	77
Passing: comp–att–int	12–22–3	8–16–1
Turnovers	3	1
Time of possession	26:32	33:28

Team	Category	Player	Statistics
North Dakota State	Passing	Nathan Hayes	12/22, 124 yards, TD, 3 INT
North Dakota State	Rushing	Myles Mitchell	22 carries, 91 yards
North Dakota State	Receiving	Chris Kiel	2 receptions, 30 yards, TD
UNLV	Passing	Jackson Arnold	8/16, 77 yards, INT
UNLV	Rushing	Jai'Den Thomas	22 carries, 112 yards
UNLV	Receiving	Kayden McGee	3 receptions, 43 yards

=== at Air Force ===
UNLV Rebels (4–2) at Air Force Falcons (4–1) – Game summary

Quarter	1	2	3	4	Total
Rebels	0	0	0	0	0
Falcons	0	0	0	0	0

at Falcon Stadium • Colorado Springs, Colorado

- Date: October 17
- Game time: 12:30 p.m. PDT
- TV announcers (CBSSN): Jordan Kent, Robert Turbin and Hailey Sutton

Game information

First quarter
Second quarter
Third quarter
Fourth quarter

Statistics	UNLV	AFA
First downs		
Plays–yards		
Rushes–yards		
Passing yards		
Passing: comp–att–int		
Turnovers		
Time of possession		

Team	Category	Player	Statistics
UNLV	Passing		
UNLV	Rushing		
UNLV	Receiving		
Air Force	Passing		
Air Force	Rushing		
Air Force	Receiving		

=== Northern Illinois ===
Northern Illinois Huskies (0–7) at UNLV Rebels (4–3) – Game summary

Quarter	1	2	3	4	Total
Huskies	0	0	0	0	0
Rebels	0	0	0	0	0

at Allegiant Stadium • Paradise, Nevada

- Date: October 31
- Game time: 7:30 p.m. PDT
- Game weather: None (indoor stadium)
- TV announcers (CBSSN): Jordan Kent, Doug Pederson and Jaclyn DeAugustino

Statistics	NIU	UNLV
First downs		
Plays–yards		
Rushes–yards		
Passing yards		
Passing: comp–att–int		
Time of possession		

Team	Category	Player	Statistics
Northern Illinois	Passing		
Northern Illinois	Rushing		
Northern Illinois	Receiving		
UNLV	Passing		
UNLV	Rushing		
UNLV	Receiving		

=== Wyoming ===
Wyoming Cowboys (5–3) at UNLV Rebels (5–3) – Game summary

Quarter	1	2	3	4	Total
Cowboys	0	0	0	0	0
Rebels	0	0	0	0	0

at Allegiant Stadium • Paradise, Nevada

- Date: November 7
- Game time: 7:30 p.m. PDT
- Game weather: None (indoor stadium)
- TV announcers (CBSSN): Chris Lewis, Doug Pederson and Hailey Sutton

Game information

First quarter
Second quarter
Third quarter
Fourth quarter

Statistics	WYO	UNLV
First downs		
Plays–yards		
Rushes–yards		
Passing yards		
Passing: comp–att–int		
Turnovers		
Time of possession		

Team	Category	Player	Statistics
Wyoming	Passing		
Wyoming	Rushing		
Wyoming	Receiving		
UNLV	Passing		
UNLV	Rushing		
UNLV	Receiving		

=== at New Mexico ===
UNLV Rebels (5–4) at New Mexico Lobos (8–1) – Game summary

Quarter	1	2	Total
Rebels			0
Lobos			0

at University Stadium • Albuquerque, New Mexico

- Date: November 14
- Game time: 4:30 p.m. PDT
- TV announcers (The CW): Jack McMullen, Cody Kessler and Marshall Newhouse

Statistics	UNLV	UNM
First downs		
Plays–yards		
Rushes–yards		
Passing yards		
Passing: comp–att–int		
Time of possession		

Team	Category	Player	Statistics
UNLV	Passing		
UNLV	Rushing		
UNLV	Receiving		
New Mexico	Passing		
New Mexico	Rushing		
New Mexico	Receiving		

=== at San Jose State ===
UNLV Rebels (6–4) vs San Jose State Spartans (5–6) – Game summary

Quarter	1	2	3	4	Total
Rebels	0	0	0	0	0
Spartans	0	0	0	0	0

at CEFCU Stadium • San Jose, California

- Date: November 21, 2026
- Game time: 4:00 p.m. PDT
- TV announcers (CBSSN): Rich Waltz, Adam Breneman and Jordan Giorgio

Game information

First quarter
Second quarter
Third quarter
Fourth quarter

Statistics	UNLV	SJSU
First downs		
Plays–yards		
Rushes–yards		
Passing yards		
Passing: comp–att–int		
Turnovers		
Time of possession		

Team	Category	Player	Statistics
UNLV	Passing		
UNLV	Rushing		
UNLV	Receiving		
San Jose State	Passing		
San Jose State	Rushing		
San Jose State	Receiving		

=== Nevada (Fremont Cannon) ===
Nevada Wolf Pack (0–0) at UNLV Rebels (0–0) – Game summary

Quarter	1	2	3	4	Total
Wolf Pack	0	0	0	0	0
Rebels	0	0	0	0	0

at Allegiant Stadium • Paradise, Nevada

- Date: November 28
- Game time: 6:00 p.m. PDT
- Game weather: None (indoor stadium)
- TV: CBSSN

Game information

First quarter
Second quarter
Third quarter
Fourth quarter

Statistics	NEV	UNLV
First downs		
Plays–yards		
Rushes–yards		
Passing yards		
Passing: comp–att–int		
Turnovers		
Time of possession		

Team	Category	Player	Statistics
Nevada	Passing		
Nevada	Rushing		
Nevada	Receiving		
UNLV	Passing		
UNLV	Rushing		
UNLV	Receiving		

== Personnel ==
=== Roster ===
2026 UNLV Rebels football team roster
Players
Coaches
Offense

Pos.	#	Name	Class
QB	1	Alex Orji	Sr
WR	4	DeAngelo Irvin Jr.	Sr
WR	8	Taeshaun Lyons	Jr
RB	9	Jai'Den Thomas	Sr
WR	10	Troy Stellato	Sr
QB	11	Jackson Arnold	Sr
QB	13	Sebastian Circo	Fr
QB	14	Derek Garcia	Fr
WR	15	Tatum Bell Jr.	Fr
WR	16	Kayden McGee	So
WR	17	Amorion Walker	Sr
WR	19	Danny Boden	Fr
RB	20	Jaylon Glover	Sr
RB	22	Skylar Vann	Fr
RB	23	Kamran Williams	Fr
RB	24	Darrien Jones	Jr
RB	29	Mohammad Maali	Sr
TE	43	Jae Beasley II	Jr
OL	55	Griffin Scorggs	Sr
OL	60	Josh Haney	Fr
OL	62	Eli Sanchez	Fr
OL	63	Alekai Afoa	Jr
OL	65	Ace Robinson	Fr
OL	66	BJ Tolo	Jr
OL	67	Malik White	Fr
OL	71	Ed Haynes	So
OL	72	Will Thomas	Sr
OL	73	Jesus Garcia II	Fr
OL	74	Amare Taase	So
OL	75	Mateo Bilaver	Fr
OL	76	Chrysanthos Fetokakis	Fr
OL	77	Colton Thomasson	Jr
OL	78	Jackson Brown	Jr
OL	79	Austin Boyd	Sr
WR	80	Taz Reddicks	Jr
WR	81	Vincent Carner	Fr
WR	82	Peyton Zachary	Fr
WR	83	Cassidee Miles	Fr
TE	84	Keyan Burnett	Sr
TE	85	Matt Byrnes	Sr
WR	86	David Titone-Perez	So
WR	87	Tavian McNair	Fr
TE	88	Velltray Jefferson	Sr
TE	89	Andreas Diaz-Nicolaidis	Fr

Defense

Pos.	#	Name	Class
DB	2	Denver Harris	Sr
DB	5	Quandarius Keyes	Sr
DB	6	Mumu Bin-Wahad	Sr
S	7	Jake Pope	Sr
DB	10	Tre Fulton	So
LB	15	Blesyng Alualu-Tuiolemotu	Jr
DL	16	Mohamed Altayeb	Sr
DL	18	Landen Thomas	Jr
S	20	Landyn Cleveland	Jr
DB	21	Joshua Tuchek	Fr
DB	22	Kyron Chambers	Sr
DB	24	Tony-Louis Nkuba	So
DB	25	Jaylen Allen	So
DB	26	Avery Helm	Sr
DB	27	Cameron Parodi	Fr
S	28	Logan Christensen	So
DB	29	Darien Lewis	Fr
LB	30	Dee Crayton	Sr
DE	32	Kenji Scanlan	So
DB	33	Tylen Matthews	Fr
LB	34	Cam Santee	Sr
LB	36	Justin Flowe	Sr
LB	38	Mark Iheanachor	Fr
DL	40	Armand Ausbon	Jr
S	41	Brock DeFries	Fr
DE	42	Andre Porter	So
LB	43	Kamuela Ka'aihue	Sr
OLB	45	Cole Albrecht	Fr
DL	49	Kal-El Togafau	Fr
LB	51	Alexander Green	Fr
LB	52	Jacob Beza	So
DL	88	Mo Abbasher	Jr
DL	90	Eliah Logo	Fr
OLB	91	Elias Rudolph	So
DL	92	Herb Gray	So
DL	94	Lucas Conti	Jr
DL	95	Bryce Waters	Fr
DL	96	Prin Fox	Fr
DL	97	Bryce Robinson	Fr
DL	98	Poe Purcell	Fr
DL	99	Jordan Covington	Fr

Special teams

Pos.	#	Name	Class
LS	0	Tyson Jacobson	Jr
P	1	Ethan Schwartz	So
PK	3	Noah Randazzo	Fr
P	4	Matt Choules	Fr
PK	32	Ramon Villela	Jr
LS	56	Andrew O'Reilly	So

Head coach

- Dan Mullen

Coordinators/assistant coaches

- Paul Guenther – Associate head coach/defensive coordinator
- Corey Dennis – Offensive coordinator/quarterbacks
- Del Alexander – Wide receivers
- Adrian Mayes – Tight ends/run game coordinator
- Quinton Ganther – Running backs
- Ricky Logo – Defensive line
- Louie Addazio – Offensive line
- Mike Scherer – Linebackers
- Bam Amina – Linebackers
- Akeem Davis – Cornerbacks
- Kap Dede – Safeties
- Mitch Singler – Special teams assistant coach
- Kyle Buckner – Offensive analyst
- Maxwell Cotton – Offensive analyst
- Vontaze Burfict – Defensive analyst
- Mitchell Dolinar – Defensive analyst
- Anthony Zampese – Recruiting assistant/offensive analyst
- Randy Russell – Recruiting assistant/defensive analyst
- Marvin Bure – Recruiting assistant/defensive analyst

Legend

- (C) Team captain
- (S) Suspended
- (I) Ineligible
- Injured
- Redshirt

Roster
Last update: 6/24/26

=== Transfers ===
==== Outgoing ====
Player	Position	Destination
Carter Jula	P	Florida State
Devin Hartsuck	DB	Garden City CC
Kodi DeCambra	S	Hawaii
Kela Moore	DB	Hawaii
Cam Brown	P	Michigan
Dyllan Drummond	OL	Montana
Anthony Colandrea	QB	Nebraska
Troy Omeire	WR	New Mexico
Nijrell Eason II	CB	Northern Arizona
Gael Ochoa	QB	Rice
Toby Moore	OL	Southeast Missouri State
Traivon Dyson	WR	Southern Illinois
Tunmise Adeleye	EDGE	Syracuse
Sam Wolfenden	LS	Temple
Isaiah Patterson	LB	West Virginia
Andrew Powdrell	CB	West Virginia
Jaden Bradley	WR	Unknown
Anthony Costanzo	DB	Unknown
Melvin Laster	LB	Unknown
Yasir Muhammad	CB	Unknown
Maysan Neubauer	OT	Unknown
Andrew Savaiinaea	TE	Unknown
Lucas Conti	DL	Withdrawn
Justin Flowe	LB	Withdrawn

==== Incoming ====
Player	Position	Previous school
Griffin Scroggs	IOL	Appalachian State
Keyan Burnett	TE	Arizona
Tony-Louis Nkuba	CB	Arizona State
Jackson Arnold	QB	Auburn
Colton Thomasson	IOL	Baylor
Dee Crayton	LB	Clemson
Tyson Jacobson	LS	Eastern Washington
Cam Santee	LB	Holy Cross
Matthew Choules	P	Kennesaw State
Troy Stellato	WR	Kentucky
Amorion Walker	WR	Middle Tennessee
BJ Tolo	IOL	New Mexico State
Landyn Cleveland	S	Oklahoma State
Taz Reddicks	WR	Oregon State
Jackson Brown	IOL	Pittsburgh
Kyron Chambers	CB	SMU
Mark Iheanachor	LB	SMU
Avery Helm	CB	TCU
Herb Gray	DL	Tennessee
