= Perry Eliano =

American football coach (born 1978)

Current position
- Title: Defensive backs coach
- Team: Syracuse Orange
- Conference: Atlantic Coast Conference

Biographical details
- Born: March 3, 1978 (age 48); Killeen, Texas, U.S.

Playing career
- 1996–1999: Stephen F. Austin

Coaching career (HC unless noted)
- 2001–2002: Stephen F. Austin (GA)
- 2003–2004: Central Arkansas (RB/WR)
- 2005: Sam Houston (Secondary)
- 2006–2009: Central Arkansas (Secondary)
- 2010: Central Arkansas (Associate Head Coach/Secondary)
- 2011–2015: UTSA (STC/SAF)
- 2016–2017: Bowling Green (Associate Head Coach/DC)
- 2018–2019: New Mexico (STC/CB)
- 2020–2021: Cincinnati (CB)
- 2022–2023: Ohio State (SAF)
- 2024–2025: Toledo (CB)
- 2026–present: Syracuse (DB)

Perry Eliano is an American football coach who is the defensive backs coach for the Syracuse Orange.

== College career ==
Eliano played for four years at Stephen F. Austin. He was named the team's Defensive Most Valuable Player after leading the team in tackles in the 1998 and 1999 season. In his senior year he recorded 99 tackles and helped the Lumberjacks to the Southland Conference championship and was additionally named all-conference following the season. He also was named the Ralph Todd Award winner which is awarded to the university's most outstanding male athlete.

== Coaching career ==
Eliano started his coaching career in 2001 at his alma mater Stephen F. Austin where he would be for two years as a graduate assistant. His next stop would be with Central Arkansas, coaching the running backs and wide receivers. After two years with Central Arkansas, Eliano was hired as the secondary coach at Sam Houston. Eliano then returned to Central Arkansas for four years as the secondary coach. He was then promoted to their associated head coach. He was then hired as the safeties and special teams coordinator at UTSA. After five years with UTSA, Eliano was hired as the associate head coach and special teams coordinator at Bowling Green. After two years with Bowling Green, Eliano's next stop was with New Mexico as the special teams coordinator and cornerbacks coach. Eliano's next stop was with Cincinnati as their cornerbacks coach. In his time with Cincinnati he helped defensive backs Sauce Gardner and Coby Bryant become All-Americans, as he was named the Football Scoop defensive backs coach of the year. After two years with Cincinnati he was hired by Ohio State as their safeties coach. On January 8, 2024, he was let go by Ohio State. On July 1, 2024, Eliano was named the cornerbacks coach at Toledo.

In 2025, Eliano was hired as the defensive backs coach for the Syracuse Orange.
