= Sean Ryan (wide receiver) =

American football player (born 1997)

Profile
- Position: Wide receiver

Personal information
- Born: January 21, 1999 (age 27); Philadelphia, Pennsylvania, U.S.
- Listed height: 6 ft 3 in (1.91 m)
- Listed weight: 200 lb (91 kg)

Career information
- High school: Erasmus Hall (Brooklyn, New York)
- College: Temple (2018); West Virginia (2019–2021); Rutgers (2022)
- NFL draft: 2023: undrafted

Career history
- Baltimore Ravens (2023–2024)*; Montreal Alouettes (2025)
- * Offseason or practice squad member only
- Stats at Pro Football Reference

Sean Ryan (born January 21, 1999) is an American professional football wide receiver. He played college football for the Temple Owls, the West Virginia Mountaineers and the Rutgers Scarlet Knights.

== College career ==
After being ranked a three-star recruit by Rivals.com and the twelfth-best player in New York, Ryan committed to Temple to play college football. As a true freshman in 2018, Ryan had 12 catches for 162 yards and his first career touchdown against East Carolina. He transferred to West Virginia for his sophomore season. In his first season with the Mountaineers, Ryan had 19 catches for 219 yards and was named to the Academic All-Big 12 Second Team. In the shortened 2020 season, he hauled in 25 catches for 264 yards, and then had a career year in 2021 with 25 receptions for 399 yards and three touchdowns. He also had one catch for seven yards in the Guaranteed Rate Bowl against Minnesota. Ryan transferred to Rutgers for his fifth and final year of college football. As a senior for the Scarlet Knights, he had a team-leading 440 receiving yards, 26 catches and three touchdowns. He had a season-high 76 yards against ranked Penn State.

== Professional career ==
Pre-draft measurables
Height	Weight	Arm length	Hand span	40-yard dash	10-yard split	20-yard split	20-yard shuttle	Three-cone drill	Vertical jump	Broad jump	Bench press
6 ft 2 3/4 in (1.90 m)	198 lb (90 kg)	33 3/4 in (0.86 m)	9 1/2 in (0.24 m)	4.59 s	1.61 s	2.60 s	4.28 s	7.09 s	39 in (0.99 m)	10 ft 4 in (3.15 m)	14 reps
All values from Pro Day

=== Baltimore Ravens ===
On May 5, 2023, Ryan signed his first NFL contract with the Baltimore Ravens. He was released on August 29, 2023, before being signed back to the practice squad the next day. He signed a reserve/future contract on January 29, 2024.

Ryan was waived by the Ravens on August 26, 2024.

=== Montreal Alouette ===
Ryan signed with the Montreal Alouettes of the Canadian Football League on March 31, 2025.

On May 14, 2026, Ryan was released by the Alouettes.
