= Corey Dennis =

American football player and coach (born 1992)

Current position
- Title: Offensive coordinator & quarterbacks coach
- Team: UNLV
- Conference: MW

Biographical details
- Born: July 25, 1992 (age 33); Auburn, Alabama, U.S.

Playing career
- 2011–2014: Georgia Tech
- Positions: Defensive back, wide receiver

Coaching career (HC unless noted)
- 2015: Ohio State (intern)
- 2016–2017: Ohio State (GA)
- 2018–2019: Ohio State (Sr. QC)
- 2020–2023: Ohio State (QB)
- 2024: Tulsa (PGC/QB)
- 2025–present: UNLV (OC/QB)

Corey Michael Dennis (born July 25, 1992) is an American football coach who is the offensive coordinator and quarterbacks coach at the University of Nevada, Las Vegas (UNLV), a position he has held since 2025. He previously served as the passing game coordinator and quarterbacks coach at the University of Tulsa in 2024.

Dennis played college football at Georgia Tech as a defensive back and wide receiver from 2011 to 2014. Prior to his tenure at UNLV, he held various assistant coaching positions at Ohio State University from 2015 to 2023.

== Playing career ==
Dennis played at Georgia Tech from 2011 to 2014, where he was a reserve defensive back before transitioning to wide receiver. Although he only caught one pass in his career in Tech's triple option offense, his biggest contribution was his play on special teams. At the conclusion of his playing career, Dennis had tied a program record by playing in all 54 games of his four-year career.

== Coaching career ==
=== Ohio State ===
After his playing career ended, Dennis got a job at Ohio State in 2015 as an intern, where his father-in-law Urban Meyer was coaching. He has acknowledged that his connection to Meyer may have played a significant part in the beginning of his career at Ohio State, but his work ethic was praised by Meyer's successor Ryan Day and former players such as Heisman Trophy winner Joe Burrow. He was promoted to a graduate assistant position in 2016, and then promoted again in 2018 as the senior quality control coach. In his role as the senior quality control coach, Dennis received praise from Ohio State quarterbacks and Heisman Trophy finalists Dwayne Haskins and Justin Fields for his assistance in their stellar 2018 and 2019 seasons.

Dennis was promoted to quarterbacks coach in 2020, replacing Mike Yurcich.

=== Tulsa ===
In 2024, Dennis joined the University of Tulsa as their passing game coordinator and quarterbacks coach.

=== UNLV ===
On January 3, 2025, Dennis was hired as the offensive coordinator and quarterbacks coach at the University of Nevada, Las Vegas (UNLV) under head coach Dan Mullen.

== Personal life ==
Born in Auburn, Alabama and raised in Troy, Dennis' father Steve played college football at Georgia and was also the athletic director at Troy from 2005 to 2012. He is married to Nicki Meyer, the daughter of former Ohio State head coach Urban Meyer who he met when they were both athletes at Georgia Tech. They have two sons and a daughter.
